= List of American novelists =

This is a list of novelists from the United States, listed with titles of a major work for each.

This is not intended to be a list of every American (born U.S. citizen, naturalized citizen, or long-time resident alien) who has published a novel. (For the purposes of this article, novel is defined as an extended work of fiction. This definition is loosely interpreted to include novellas, novelettes, and books of interconnected short stories.) Novelists on this list have achieved a notability that exceeds merely having been published. The writers on the current list fall into one or more of the following categories:

1. All American novelists who have articles in Wikipedia should be on this list, and even if they do not clearly meet any other criteria they should not be removed until the article itself is removed.
2. Winner of a major literary prize, even if the winning work was a story collection rather than a novel: the Pulitzer Prize, the PEN American Center Book Awards, the National Book Award, the American Book Awards, the National Book Critics Circle Award, and others. (Note: The only Pulitzer winner for Fiction not on the list is James Alan McPherson, who has never published a novel.)
3. Having a substantial body of work, widely respected and reviewed in major publications, and perhaps often nominated or a finalist for major awards.
4. A pioneering literary figure, possibly for the style or substance of their entire body of work, or for a single novel that was a notable "first" of some kind in U.S. literary history.
5. Had several massive bestsellers, or even just one huge seller that has entered the cultural lexicon (Grace Metalious and Peyton Place, for example).
6. A leading figure—especially award-winning, and with crossover appeal to mainstream readers, reviewers, and scholars—in a major genre or subcategory of fiction: Romance, science fiction, fantasy, horror, mystery, western, young adult fiction, regional or "local color" fiction, proletarian fiction, etc.

== A ==
- Patricia Aakhus (1952–2012), The Voyage of Mael Duin's Curragh
- Rachel Aaron, Fortune's Pawn
- Atia Abawi (born 1982)
- Edward Abbey (1927–1989), The Monkey Wrench Gang
- Lynn Abbey (born 1948), Daughter of the Bright Moon
- Laura Abbot, My Name Is Nell
- Belle Kendrick Abbott (1842–1893), Leah Mordecai
- Eleanor Hallowell Abbott (1872–1958), poet, novelist and short story writer
- Hailey Abbott, Summer Boys
- Mary Abbott (1857–1904), Alexia
- Megan Abbott (born 1971), Die a Little
- Shirley Abbott (1934–2019), The Bookmaker's Daughter: A Memory Unbound
- Shana Abé, A Rose in Winter
- Louise Abeita (1926–2014), Native American Isleta Pueblo writer, I Am a Pueblo Indian Girl
- Robert H. Abel (1941–2017)
- Joan Abelove (born 1945), Go and Come Back
- Aberjhani (born 1957)
- Walter Abish (1931–2022), How German Is It
- Abiola Abrams (born 1976), television host, art filmmaker and writer, Dare
- Stacey Abrams (born 1973), While Justice Sleeps
- Traci Hunter Abramson, Smokescreen
- Diana Abu-Jaber (born 1960), Arabian Jazz
- Susan Abulhawa (born 1970), Mornings in Jenin
- Evelyne Accad (born 1943), The Excised
- Elizabeth Acevedo, The Poet X
- Kathy Acker (1947–1997), Blood and Guts in High School
- Danielle Ackley-McPhail (born 1970), Tomorrow's Memories
- Marta Acosta, Happy Hour at Casa Dracula
- Cherry Adair, Black Magic
- Alice Adams (1926–1999), Beautiful Girl
- Deborah Adams, All the Great Pretenders
- Henry Adams (1838–1918), Democracy: An American Novel
- Kathryn Adams Doty (1920–2016), A Long Year of Silence
- Yda Addis (1857–1902), writer and translator
- Kim Addonizio (born 1954), poet, novelist
- George Ade (1866–1944), The Slim Princess
- Renata Adler (born 1938), Speedboat
- Warren Adler (1927–2019), The War of the Roses
- James Agee (1909–1955), A Death in the Family
- Charlotte Agell (born 1959), novelist and children's writer
- Kelli Russell Agodon (born 1969), writer, including poet,and editor
- Conrad Aiken (1889–1973), Blue Voyage
- Hiag Akmakjian (1926–2017)
- Mitch Albom (born 1958), The Five People You Meet in Heaven
- Kathleen Alcalá (born 1954), Spirits of the Ordinary
- Louisa May Alcott (1832–1888), Little Women
- Isabella Macdonald Alden (1841–1930), children's writer
- Clifford Lindsey Alderman (1902–1988)
- Anne Reeve Aldrich (1866–1892)
- Thomas Bailey Aldrich (1836–1907), Prudence Palfrey
- Malin Alegria
- Grace Alexander (1872–1951), Judith
- Lloyd Alexander (1924–2007), The Black Cauldron
- Tasha Alexander (born 1969)
- Sherman Alexie (born 1966), Reservation Blues
- Horatio Alger Jr. (1832–1899), Ragged Dick
- Jo Ann Algermissen (1942–2009), I Do?
- Nelson Algren (1909–1981), The Man with the Golden Arm
- Hervey Allen (1889–1949), Anthony Adverse
- Isabel Allende (born 1942), Chilean/American novelist, Eva Luna, Daughter of Fortune
- Dorothy Allison (1949–2024), Bastard Out of Carolina
- Lisa Alther (born 1944), Kinflicks
- Joseph Alexander Altsheler (1862–1919), The Young Trailers
- Julia Alvarez (born 1950), How the García Girls Lost Their Accents
- Rudolfo Anaya (1937–2020), Bless Me, Ultima
- Laurie Halse Anderson (born 1961), Speak
- Poul Anderson (1926–2001), Tau Zero
- Steve Anderson (born 1966)
- Sherwood Anderson (1876–1941), Winesburg, Ohio
- Eliza Frances Andrews (1840–1931), novelist and Civil War writer
- V. C. Andrews (1923–1986), Flowers in the Attic
- Tina McElroy Ansa (1949–2024), Baby of the Family
- A. Manette Ansay (born 1964), Vinegar Hill
- Donald Antrim (born 1959), The Hundred Brothers
- Gloria E. Anzaldúa (1942–2004), writer, including poet, and activist, Borderlands/La Frontera: The New Mestiza
- Allen Appel (born 1945), Time After Time
- Benjamin Appel (1907–1979), Brain Guy
- Max Apple (born 1941), Zip: A Novel of the Left and the Right
- Harold Hunter Armstrong (1884–1979)
- Harriette Arnow (1908–1986), The Dollmaker
- Timothy Shay Arthur (1809–1885), Ten Nights in a Bar-Room and What I Saw There
- Sholem Asch (1880–1957), The Nazarene
- Inez Asher (1911–2006), television writer and novelist, Family Sins
- Kristen Ashley (born 1968)
- Anastasia Ashman (born 1964), writer and cultural producer, Tales from the Expat Harem
- Isaac Asimov (1920–1992), The Gods Themselves
- Rilla Askew (born 1951), The Mercy Seat
- Robert Asprin (1946–2008), Another Fine Myth
- Gertrude Atherton (1857–1948), The Conqueror
- Eleanor Stackhouse Atkinson (1863–1942), writer, including journalist, and teacher
- William Attaway (1911–1986), Blood on the Forge
- Amelia Atwater-Rhodes (born 1984), In the Forests of the Night
- Louis Auchincloss (1917–2010), The Rector of Justin
- Jean M. Auel (born 1936), The Clan of the Cave Bear
- Paul Auster (1947–2024), New York Trilogy
- Mary Hunter Austin (1868–1934), Isidro
- Victoria Aveyard (born 1990), Red Queen series

== B ==
=== Ba–Be ===
- James Baar (1929–2021)
- Sanora Babb (1907–2005)
- C. Morgan Babst (born 1980)
- Richard Bach (born 1936), Jonathan Livingston Seagull
- Irving Bacheller (1859–1950), A Man for the Ages
- George Bagby (1906–1985), Murder at the Piano
- Dorothy Baker (1907–1968), Young Man with a Horn
- James Robert Baker (1947–1997), Fuel-Injected Dreams
- Nicholson Baker (born 1957), Vox
- Kirsten Bakis (born 1968), Lives of the Monster Dogs
- Faith Baldwin (1893–1978), The Heart Has Wings
- James Baldwin (1924–1987), Go Tell It on the Mountain
- Leigh Bale
- John Ball (1911–1988), In the Heat of the Night
- Toni Cade Bambara (1939–1995), The Salt Eaters
- Anna Banks
- Russell Banks (1940–2023), The Sweet Hereafter
- Margaret Culkin Banning (1891–1982), Country Club People
- Amiri Baraka (LeRoi Jones) (1934–2014), The System of Dante's Hell
- Tom Barbash, The Last Good Chance
- Anna Maynard Barbour (died 1941), That Mainwaring Affair
- John Franklin Bardin (1916–1981), Devil Take the Blue-Tail Fly
- Brad Barkley (born 1961), Money, Love
- Annie Maria Barnes (1857 – 1933 or 1943), Some Lowly Lives and the Heights They Reached
- Djuna Barnes (1892–1982), Nightwood
- Linda Barnes (born 1949), A Trouble of Fools
- Margaret Ayer Barnes (1886–1967), Years of Grace
- Steven Barnes (born 1952), The Legacy of Heorot (co-author)
- Wilton Barnhardt (born 1960), Gospel
- Amelia Edith Huddleston Barr (1831–1919), Jan Vedder's Wife
- Nevada Barr (born 1952), Track of the Cat
- Stringfellow Barr (1897–1982)
- Andrea Barrett (born 1964), The Voyage of the Narwhal
- Lillian Barrett (1884–1963), The Sinister Revel, Gibbeted Gods, and The Crowd Out Front
- John Barth (1930–2024), Giles Goat-Boy
- Donald Barthelme (1931–1989), Snow White
- Frederick Barthelme (born 1943), Chroma
- Alice E. Bartlett (1848–1920), Until the Daybreak
- Nalbro Bartley (1888–1952), A Woman's Woman
- Fredrick Barton
- Rick Bass (born 1958), Where the Sea Used to Be
- Sara Ware Bassett (1872–1968)
- Hamilton Basso (1904–1964), The View from Pompey's Head
- Harriet Bates (1856–1886), wrote under the name Eleanor Putnam
- Margret Holmes Bates (1844–1927), Manitou
- Emma Pow Bauder (1848–1932), The Inhabitants of Two Worlds
- L. Frank Baum (1856–1919), The Wonderful Wizard of Oz
- Beth Ann Bauman
- Richard Bausch (born 1945), The Last Good Time
- Robert Bausch (1945–2018), Almighty Me
- Charles Baxter (born 1947), Shadow Play
- Jonathan Bayliss (1926–2009), the fiction tetralogy Gloucesterman
- Peter S. Beagle (born 1939), The Last Unicorn
- Theodore Beale (born 1968), The War in Heaven, The Eternal Warriors
- Clare Beams (born 1980/81), The Illness Lesson
- Greg Bear (1951–2022), Darwin's Radio
- Ann Beattie (born 1947), Chilly Scenes of Winter
- Paul Beatty (born 1962), The Sellout
- Jessica Beck
- Louis Begley (born 1933), About Schmidt
- Madison Smartt Bell (born 1957), All Souls' Rising
- Edward Bellamy (1850–1898), Looking Backward: 2000–1887
- Elizabeth Whitfield Croom Bellamy (1837–1900), Four Oaks
- Saul Bellow (1915–2005), Henderson the Rain King
- Peter Benchley (1940–2006), Jaws
- Aimee Bender (born 1969), An Invisible Sign of My Own
- Pinckney Benedict (born 1964), Dogs of God
- Stephen Vincent Benét (1898–1943), Spanish Bayonet
- Gregory Benford (born 1941), Timescape
- Gary L. Bennett (born 1940), The Star Sailors
- Jenn Bennett
- Marcia Joanne Bennett (born 1945)
- Thomas Berger (1924–2014), Little Big Man
- Gina Berriault (1926–1999), The Descent
- Don Berry (1931–2001), Trask
- Wendell Berry (1934–2026), A Place on Earth
- Alfred Bester (1913–1987), The Demolished Man
- Doris Betts (1932–2012), Souls Raised from the Dead

=== Bf–Bz ===
- Kiran Bhat (born 1990)
- Earl Derr Biggers (1884–1933), The Chinese Parrot
- Donia Bijan, "The Last Days of Cafe Leila"
- Jessica Bird (born 1969), Black Dagger Brotherhood series
- Robert Montgomery Bird (1803–1854), Nick of the Woods
- Michael Bishop (1945–2023), No Enemy But Time
- Pam Blackwell (born 1942)
- William Peter Blatty (1928–2017), The Exorcist
- Winfred Blevins (1938–2023), Stone Song, Story of the Life of Crazy Horse
- Robert Bloch (1917–1994), Psycho
- Francesca Lia Block (born 1962), Weetzie Bat
- Lawrence Block (born 1938), Eight Million Ways to Die
- Stefan Merrill Block (born 1982)
- Mabel Fuller Blodgett (1869–1959)
- Joan Blondell (1906–1979), Center Door Fancy
- Amy Bloom (born 1953), Love Invents Us
- Judy Blume (born 1938), Are You There, God? It's Me, Margaret
- Tom Boggs (1905–1952)
- Chris Bohjalian (born 1960), The Law of Similars
- Arna Bontemps (1902–1973), God Sends Sunday
- Kola Boof
- Emma Scarr Booth (1835–1927), Karan Kringle's Journal
- Anthony Boucher (1911–1968), The Case of the Seven of Calvary
- Vance Bourjaily (1922–2010), Brill Among the Ruins
- Ben Bova (1932–2020), The Starcrossed
- Jane Bowles (1917–1973), Two Serious Ladies
- Paul Bowles (1910–1999), The Sheltering Sky
- Valerie Bowman
- Blanche McCrary Boyd (born 1945), The Revolution of Little Girls
- James Boyd (1888–1944), Drums
- Jennifer Finney Boylan (previously James Finney Boylan) (born 1958), The Planets
- Roger Boylan (born 1951), Killoyle
- Kay Boyle (1902–1992), Death of a Man
- T. Coraghessan Boyle (born 1948), The Road to Wellville
- Virginia Frazer Boyle (1863–1938)
- Gerald Warner Brace (1901–1978), The World of Carrick's Cove
- Hugh Henry Brackenridge (1748–1816), Modern Chivalry
- Leigh Brackett (1915–1978), The Secret of Sinharat
- Ray Bradbury (1920–2012), The Illustrated Man
- David Bradley (born 1950), The Chaneysville Incident
- Marion Zimmer Bradley (1930–1999), The Mists of Avalon
- Billy Lee Brammer (1929–1978), The Gay Place
- Max Brand (1892–1944), Destry Rides Again
- Giannina Braschi (born 1954), Yo-Yo Boing!
- Richard Brautigan (1935–1984), Trout Fishing in America
- Kate Braverman (1949–2019), Lithium for Medea
- Anna de Brémont (c. 1856–1922)
- Sandra Bretting
- Matt Briggs (born 1970), Shoot the Buffalo
- David Brin (born 1950), The Uplift War
- Robert O'Neil Bristow (1926–2018)
- Poppy Z. Brite (born 1967), Exquisite Corpse
- Margueritte Harmon Bro (1894–1977), Sarah
- Amber Brock (born 1980)
- Harold Brodkey (1930–1996), The Runaway Soul
- Louis Bromfield (1896–1956), The Rains Came
- Geraldine Brooks (born 1955), March
- Terry Brooks (born 1944), The Sword of Shannara
- Alice Brown (1857–1948), Fools of Nature
- Annie Greene Brown (1855–1923), Fireside Battles
- Charles Brockden Brown (1771–1810), Wieland
- Dan Brown (born 1964), The Da Vinci Code
- Don Brown (born 1960), Treason
- Eleanor Brown (born 1969), The Weird Sisters
- Harry Brown (1917–1986), A Walk in the Sun
- Larry Brown (1951–2004), Dirty Work
- Rita Mae Brown (born 1944), Rubyfruit Jungle
- Rosellen Brown (born 1939), Before and After
- William Hill Brown (1756–1793), The Power of Sympathy
- Steven Brust (born 1955), the Dragaera series
- Pearl S. Buck (1892–1973), The Good Earth
- Michael Buckley (born 1969), The Sisters Grimm series
- Frederick Buechner (1926–2022), Godric
- Charles Bukowski (1920–1994), Factotum
- Emma Bull (born 1954), War for the Oaks
- Edward Bunker (1933–2005), Little Boy Blue
- Eugene Burdick (1918–1965), The Ugly American (with William Lederer)
- James Lee Burke (born 1936), The Neon Rain
- Frances Hodgson Burnett (1849–1924), Little Lord Fauntleroy
- William R. Burnett (1899–1982), Little Caesar
- Clara Louise Burnham (1854–1927), Jewel: A Chapter in Her Life
- Olive Ann Burns (1924–1990), Cold Sassy Tree
- Edgar Rice Burroughs (1875–1950), Tarzan of the Apes
- William S. Burroughs (1914–1997), Naked Lunch
- Frederick Busch (1941–2006), Harry and Catherine
- Gary Buslik (born 1946)
- Octavia E. Butler (1947–2006), Patternmaster
- Robert Olen Butler (born 1945), The Alleys of Eden
- Martha Haines Butt (1833–1871), Antifanaticism
- Elizabeth Byrd (1912–1989)

== C ==
=== Ca–Cm ===
- George Washington Cable (1844–1925), The Grandissimes
- Meg Cabot (born 1967), The Princess Diaries
- Abraham Cahan (1860–1951), The Rise of David Levinsky
- Chelsea Cain (born 1972), Heartsick
- James M. Cain (1892–1977), The Postman Always Rings Twice
- Erskine Caldwell (1903–1987), God's Little Acre
- Taylor Caldwell (1900–1985), Dynasty of Death
- Wayne Caldwell (born 1948)
- Hortense Calisher (1911–2009), False Entry
- Sophia Alice Callahan (1868–1894), Wynema, a Child of the Forest
- Bebe Moore Campbell (1950–2006), Singing in the Comeback Choir
- Helen Stuart Campbell (1839–1918), Ballantyne – A Novel
- John W. Campbell (1910–1971), The Mightiest Machine
- Ethan Canin (born 1960), For Kings and Planets
- Robert Cantwell (1908–1978), The Land of Plenty
- Kevin Canty (born 1953), Nine Below Zero
- Truman Capote (1924–1984), Other Voices, Other Rooms
- Philip Caputo (1941–2026), Delcorso's Gallery
- Orson Scott Card (born 1951), Ender's Game
- Ruth Cardello
- Ron Carlson (born 1947), Betrayed by F. Scott Fitzgerald
- Don Carpenter (1931–1995), Hard Rain Falling
- Caleb Carr (1955–2024), The Alienist
- John Dickson Carr (1906–1977), The Crooked Hinge
- Gail Carriger (born 1976), Soulless
- H. G. Carrillo (1960–2020)
- Gladys Hasty Carroll (1904–1999), As the Earth Turns
- Jonathan Carroll (born 1949), The Land of Laughs
- Ella Kaiser Carruth (1882–1974)
- Aimee Carter (born 1986)
- Forrest Carter (1925–1979), The Education of Little Tree
- Lin Carter (1930–1988), Sky Pirates of Callisto
- Xam Wilson Cartier (born 1949)
- John Casey (1939–2025), Spartina
- Wiley Cash (born 1977)
- Vera Caspary (1899–1987), Laura
- R. V. Cassill (1919–2002), Dr. Cobb's Game
- Ana Castillo (born 1953), So Far from God
- Willa Cather (1873–1947), My Ántonia
- Dominic Certo, The Valor of Francesco D’Amini
- Michael Chabon (born 1964), The Amazing Adventures of Kavalier & Clay
- Nathan Keonaona Chai
- Jack L. Chalker (1944–2005), Midnight at the Well of Souls
- Marisha Chamberlin (born 1952)
- Robert W. Chambers (1865–1933), In the Quarter
- Jessie Chandler (born 1968), Bingo Barge Murder
- Raymond Chandler (1888–1959), The Big Sleep
- Henry Chang
- James Chapman (born 1955), Stet
- Fred Chappell (1936–2024), Dagon
- Jerome Charyn (born 1937), Blue Eyes
- Mary Ellen Chase (1887–1973), Mary Peters
- Loretta Chase (born 1949), Lord of Scoundrels
- Ruth Chatterton (1892–1961)
- Stephen Chbosky (born 1970), The Perks of Being a Wallflower
- John Cheever (1912–1982), The Wapshot Chronicle
- Maxine Chernoff (born 1952), American Heaven
- Kelly Cherry (1940–2022), We Can Still Be Friends
- C. J. Cherryh (born 1942), Cyteen
- Charles W. Chesnutt (1858–1932), The Marrow of Tradition
- Alan Cheuse (1940–2015), The Grandmothers' Club
- Tracy Chevalier (born 1962), Girl with a Pearl Earring
- Lydia Maria Child (1802–1880), Hobomok
- Mark Childress (born 1957), Crazy in Alabama
- Kate Chopin (1851–1904), The Awakening
- Autumn Christian, Girl Like a Bomb
- April Christofferson
- Edgar Earl Christopher, The Invisibles
- Winston Churchill (1871–1947), Richard Carvel
- Carolyn Chute (born 1947), The Beans of Egypt, Maine
- Sandra Cisneros (born 1954), The House on Mango Street
- Tom Clancy (1947–2013), The Hunt for Red October
- Eleanor Clark (1913–1996), Baldur's Gate
- Felicia Buttz Clark (1862–1931)
- Florence Anderson Clark (1835–1918), Zenaida, a Romance
- Mary Higgins Clark (1927–2020), A Stranger Is Watching
- Walter Van Tilburg Clark (1909–1971), The Ox-Bow Incident
- Isabel C. Clarke (1869–1951)
- Jaime Clarke (born 1971), Garden Lakes
- Meg Waite Clayton (born 1959), The Wednesday Sisters
- Beverly Cleary (1916–2021), Ramona the Pest
- Jeremiah Clemens (1814–1865), Tobias Wilson
- Samuel Langhorne Clemens (see: Mark Twain)
- Hal Clement (1922–2003), Mission of Gravity
- Michelle Cliff (1946–2016), Abeng
- Ernest Cline (born 1972)

=== Cn–Cz ===
- Deborah Coates
- Robert M. Coates (1897–1973), The Eater of Darkness
- Harlan Coben (born 1962), Deal Breaker
- Colleen Coble
- Sarah Johnson Cocke (1865–1944)
- Marvin Cohen (1931–2025), Others, Including Morstive Sternbump
- Richard Cohen (born 1952)
- Kresley Cole
- Teju Cole (born 1975), Open City
- Manda Collins
- Laurie Colwin (1944–1992), Shine On, Bright and Dangerous Object
- Richard Condon (1915–1996), The Manchurian Candidate
- Evan S. Connell (1924–2013), Mrs. Bridge
- Michael Connelly (born 1956), Blood Work
- Frank Conroy (1936–2005), Body and Soul
- Pat Conroy (1945–2016), The Prince of Tides
- K. C. Constantine (1934–2023), Upon Some Midnights Clear
- Robin Cook (born 1940), Coma
- John Esten Cooke (1830–1886), The Virginia Comedians
- Caroline B. Cooney (born 1947), No Such Person
- Dennis Cooper (born 1953), Frisk
- Doug Cooper (born 1970)
- J. California Cooper (1931–2014), Some People, Some Other Place
- James Fenimore Cooper (1789–1851), The Last of the Mohicans
- Susan Rogers Cooper (born 1947)
- Robert Coover (1932–2024), The Universal Baseball Association, Inc., J. Henry Waugh, Prop.
- Lucy Corin (born 1970), Everyday Psychokillers: A History for Girls
- Edwin Corle (1906–1956), Fig Tree John
- Robert Cormier (1925–2000), The Chocolate War
- Mary A. Cornelius (1829–1918), Uncle Nathan's Farm
- Patricia Cornwell (born 1956), Postmortem
- Temra Costa
- Gay Courter (born 1944)
- James Gould Cozzens (1903–1978), Guard of Honor
- Cola Barr Craig (1861–1930), Was She: A Novel
- Robert Crais (born c. 1953), Hostage
- Stephen Crane (1871–1900), The Red Badge of Courage
- Bruce Harris Craven
- Margaret Craven (1901–1980), I Heard the Owl Call My Name
- Francis Marion Crawford (1854–1909), Saracinesca
- Harry Crews (1935–2012), Scar Lover
- Michael Crichton (1942–2008), Jurassic Park
- Robert Crichton (1925–1993), The Secret of Santa Vittoria
- Amanda Cross (1926–2003), The James Joyce Murder
- John Crowley (born 1942), Little, Big
- Mary Cruger (1834 – 1908), The Vanderheyde Manor House
- Jennifer Crusie (born 1949), Welcome to Temptation
- Chris Crutcher (born 1946), Staying Fat for Sarah Byrnes
- Chris Culver
- Ann Cummins, Yellowcake
- Maria Susanna Cummins (1827–1866), The Lamplighter
- Michael Cunningham (born 1952), The Hours
- James Oliver Curwood (1878–1927), The Grizzly King
- Clive Cussler (1931–2020), Raise the Titanic!

== D ==
- H.D. (1886–1961), Palimpsest
- Edward Dahlberg (1900–1977), Bottom Dogs
- Madeleine Vinton Dahlgren (1825–1898), Democracy, an American novel
- Frances Brackett Damon (1857–1939), Idlewise
- Mark Z. Danielewski (born 1966), House of Leaves
- Edwidge Danticat (born 1969), Breath, Eyes, Memory
- Evan Dara, The Lost Scrapbook
- Guy Davenport (1927–2005), Da Vinci's Bicycle
- Marcia Davenport (1903–1994), East Side, West Side
- Avram Davidson (1923–1993), The Phoenix and the Mirror
- Clyde Brion Davis (1894–1962), Nebraska Coast
- Dorothy Salisbury Davis (1916–2014), Death of an Old Sinner
- Genese Davis (born 1984)
- H. L. Davis (1894–1960), Honey in the Horn
- L. J. Davis, A Meaningful Life
- Richard Harding Davis (1864–1916), Soldiers of Fortune
- Terry Davis (born 1947), Vision Quest
- L. Sprague de Camp (1907–2000), Lest Darkness Fall
- John William De Forest (1826–1926),
  Miss Ravenel's Conversion from Secession to Loyalty
- Peter De Vries (1910–1993), Reuben, Reuben
- Jeffery Deaver (born 1950), The Bone Collector
- Darren DeFrain (born 1967)
- Ted Dekker (born 1962), ADAM
- Lester del Rey (1915–1993), Attack from Atlantis
- Margaret Deland (1857–1945), John Ward, Preacher
- Samuel R. Delany (born 1942), Dhalgren, Hogg
- Don DeLillo (born 1936), White Noise
- Viña Delmar (1903–1990), Bad Girl
- Patrick Dennis (1921–1976), Auntie Mame
- August Derleth (1909–1971), The Memoirs of Solar Pons
- Amber Dermont
- Bree Despain (born 1979)
- Jude Deveraux (born 1947), A Knight in Shining Armor
- Pete Dexter (born 1943), Paris Trout
- Junot Díaz (born 1968), The Brief Wondrous Life of Oscar Wao
- Philip K. Dick (1928–1982), Do Androids Dream of Electric Sheep?
- James Dickey (1923–1997), Deliverance
- Charles Dickinson (born 1951), Waltz in Marathon
- Joan Didion (1934–2021), Play It as It Lays
- Karen Dionne (born 1953)
- Thomas M. Disch (1940–2008), Camp Concentration
- Chitra Banerjee Divakaruni (born 1956), The Mistress of Spices
- Melvin Dixon (1950–1992), Trouble the Water
- Stephen Dixon (1936–2019), Frog
- Thomas Dixon Jr. (1864–1946), The Clansman
- Moshe Dluznowsky
- Stephen Dobyns (born 1941), The Wrestler's Cruel Study
- E. L. Doctorow (1931–2015), Ragtime
- Anna Bowman Dodd (1858–1929), The Republic of the Future
- Mary Mapes Dodge (1831–1905), Hans Brinker
- Harriet Doerr (1910–2002), Stones for Ibarra
- Ivan Doig (1939–2015), Ride with Me, Mariah Montana
- John Dolan (born 1955), Shantee'
- Stephen R. Donaldson (born 1947), Lord Foul's Bane
- J. P. Donleavy (1926–2017), The Ginger Man
- Richard Dooling (born 1954), White Man's Grave
- Michael Dorris (1945–1997), A Yellow Raft in Blue Water
- John Dos Passos (1896–1970), U.S.A.
- Kathryn Adams Doty (1920–2016)
- Lloyd C. Douglas (1877–1951), Magnificent Obsession
- Christopher Dow (born 1950)
- Fanny Murdaugh Downing (1831–1894), Nameless, a novel
- J. Hyatt Downing (1888–1973)
- Theodore Dreiser (1871–1945), An American Tragedy
- Allen Drury (1918–1998), Advise and Consent
- Tom Drury (born 1956), The End of Vandalism
- Andre Dubus III (born 1959), House of Sand and Fog
- Bruce Ducker (born 1938), Mooney in Flight
- John Dufresne (born 1948), Louisiana Power and Light
- David James Duncan (born 1952), The Brothers K
- Katherine Dunn (1945–2016), Geek Love
- John Gregory Dunne (1932–2003), True Confessions
- John Dunning (1942–2023), Booked to Die

== E ==
- Mary Tracy Earle (1864–1955), The Wonderful Wheel
- Tony Earley (born 1961), Jim the Boy
- Mignon G. Eberhart (1899–1996), The Patient in Room 18
- David Eddings (1931–2008), Pawn of Prophecy
- Clyde Edgerton (born 1944), Walking Across Egypt
- Walter D. Edmonds (1903–1998), Drums Along the Mohawk
- George Alec Effinger (1947–2002), When Gravity Fails
- Jennifer Egan (born 1962), A Visit from the Goon Squad
- Dave Eggers (born 1970), You Shall Know Our Velocity
- Edward Eggleston (1837–1902), The Hoosier Schoolmaster
- John Ehle (1924–2018), Last One Home
- Jill Eisenstadt (born 1963), From Rockaway, Kiss Out, Swell
- Robert Elegant (1928–2023), Dynasty
- Stanley Elkin (1930–1995), Mrs. Ted Bliss
- Aaron Elkins (born 1935), Old Bones
- Stanley Ellin (1916–1986), The Eighth Circle
- Bret Easton Ellis (born 1964), American Psycho, Glamorama
- Edward S. Ellis (1840–1916), Seth Jones; or, The Captives of the Frontier
- Trey Ellis (born 1962), Right Here, Right Now
- Ralph Ellison (1914–1994), Invisible Man
- James Ellroy (born 1948), L.A. Confidential
- Carol Emshwiller (1921–2019), Carmen Dog
- Susan Engberg
- Hiron Ennes, Leech
- Louise Erdrich (born 1954), Love Medicine
- Steve Erickson (born 1950), Arc d'X
- Payne Erskine (1854–1924)
- Andrew Ervin (born 1971), Burning Down George Orwell's House
- Loren D. Estleman (born 1952), Motor City Blue
- Jeffrey Eugenides (born 1960), The Virgin Suicides
- Janet Evanovich (born 1943), One For the Money
- Richard Paul Evans (born 1962), The Christmas Box and Michael Vey series
- Lizzie P. Evans-Hansell (1836–1922), Aunt Nabby
- Augusta Jane Evans Wilson (1835–1909), St. Elmo
- Frederick Exley (1929–1992), A Fan's Notes

== F ==
- Ann Fairbairn (1901–1972), Five Smooth Stones
- Janet Ayer Fairbank (1878–1951), The Bright Land
- Amber Fallon (born 1983), horror writer
- John Fante (1909–1983), Wait Until Spring, Bandini
- Richard Fariña (1937–1966), Been Down So Long It Looks Like Up to Me
- Philip José Farmer (1918–2009), To Your Scattered Bodies Go
- James T. Farrell (1904–1979), Young Lonigan
- Howard Fast (1914–2003), April Morning
- William Faulkner (1897–1962), Light in August
- Jessie Redmon Fauset (1882–1961), Plum Bun: A Novel Without a Moral
- Jürgen Fauth (born 1969)
- Kenneth Fearing (1902–1961), The Big Clock
- Raymond Federman (1928–2009), The Twofold Vibration
- Raymond E. Feist (born 1945), Magician
- Edna Ferber (1885–1968), So Big
- Ira Lunan Ferguson (1904–1992)
- Harvey Fergusson (1890–1971), The Conquest of Don Pedro
- Rachel Field (1894–1942), All This, and Heaven Too
- Amanda Filipacchi (born 1967), Love Creeps
- Charles Finch (born 1980), A Beautiful Blue Death
- Martha Farquharson Finley (1828–1909), Elsie Dinsmore
- Jack Finney (1911–1995), Time and Again
- Dorothy Canfield Fisher (1879–1958), Understood Betsy
- Rudolph Fisher (1897–1934), The Walls of Jericho
- Vardis Fisher (1895–1968), Children of God
- Anna M. Fitch (1840–1904), Bound Down
- Janet Fitch (born 1955), White Oleander
- F. Scott Fitzgerald (1896–1940), The Great Gatsby
- Louise Fitzhugh (1928–1974), Harriet the Spy
- Ambrose Flack (1902–1980)
- Raymond Flanagan (1903–1990), Three Religious Rebels. The Forefathers of the Trappists
- Thomas Flanagan (1923–2002), The Year of the French
- Martin Flavin (1883–1967), Journey in the Dark
- Paul Fleischman (born 1952), Whirligig
- Sid Fleischman (1920–2010), The Whipping Boy
- Lynn Flewelling (born 1958), Nightrunner
- Vince Flynn (1966–2013), Pursuit of Honor
- Jonathan Safran Foer (born 1977), Everything Is Illuminated
- Mary Hallock Foote (1847–1938), The Chosen Valley
- Shelby Foote (1916–2005), Shiloh
- Esther Forbes (1891–1967), Johnny Tremain
- Jesse Hill Ford (1928–1996), The Liberation of Lord Byron Jones
- John M. Ford (1957–2006), The Dragon Waiting
- Paul Leicester Ford (1865–1902), The Honorable Peter Stirling
- Richard Ford (born 1944), Independence Day
- Leon Forrest (1937–1997), There Is a Tree More Ancient Than Eden
- Robert Forward (1932–2002), Dragon's Egg
- Alan Dean Foster (born 1946), Midworld
- Hannah Webster Foster (1758–1840), The Coquette
- Karen Joy Fowler (born 1950), The Jane Austen Book Club
- John Fox Jr. (1862–1919), The Trail of the Lonesome Pine
- Paula Fox (1923–2017), Desperate Characters
- William Price Fox (1926–2015), Ruby Red
- Sohrab Homi Fracis (born 1958
- Jacquelyn Frank
- Suzanne Frank
- Waldo Frank (1889–1967), Holiday
- Jonathan Franzen (born 1959), The Corrections
- Rhiannon Frater
- Charles Frazier (born 1950), Cold Mountain
- Harold Frederic (1856–1898), The Damnation of Theron Ware
- Mary Eleanor Wilkins Freeman (1852–1930), Pembroke
- Joseph Lewis French (1858–1936), Masterpieces of Mystery
- Marilyn French (1929–2009), The Women's Room
- William Aden French (1892–1980)
- Bruce Jay Friedman (1930–2020), Stern
- Kinky Friedman (1944–2024), Greenwich Killing Time
- Daniel Fuchs (1909–1993), Summer in Williamsburg
- Andrew Fukuda
- Henry Blake Fuller (1857–1929), The Cliff-Dwellers
- David Fulmer (born 1950), Chasing the Devil's Tail
- Alan Furst (born 1941), Night Soldiers

== G ==
- Tom Gabbay (born 1953), The Berlin Conspiracy
- Ellen Gable (born 1959)
- William Gaddis (1922–1998), The Recognitions
- Ernest J. Gaines (1933–2019), The Autobiography of Miss Jane Pittman
- Mary Gaitskill (born 1954), Two Girls, Fat and Thin
- Zona Gale (1874–1938), Miss Lulu Bett
- Paul Gallico (1897–1976), The Poseidon Adventure
- Robert Gandt (born 1939)
- Ernest K. Gann (1910–1991), The High and the Mighty
- Cristina García (born 1958), Dreaming in Cuban
- John Reynolds Gardiner (1944–2006), Stone Fox
- Erle Stanley Gardner (1889–1970), The Case of the Velvet Claws
- John Gardner (1933–1982), Grendel
- Leonard Gardner (born 1933), Fat City
- Hamlin Garland (1860–1940), A Daughter of the Middle Border
- George Garrett (1929–2008), Death of the Fox
- Chloe Gartner (1916–2003), The Infidels
- Haley Elizabeth Garwood (born 1940), The Forgotten Queen
- Julie Garwood (1944–2023), Ransom
- William H. Gass (1924–2017), Omensetter's Luck
- David Gates (born 1947), Jernigan
- William Gay (1941–2012)
- Elizabeth George (born 1949), A Great Deliverance
- Sarah Gerard, Binary Star
- Christien Gholson (born 1964), A Fish Trapped Inside the Wind
- Kaye Gibbons (born 1960), Ellen Foster
- William Gibson (born 1948), Neuromancer
- Scott G. Gier (born 1948)
- Barry Gifford (born 1946), Wild at Heart
- Dagoberto Gilb (born 1950), The Last Known Residence of Mickey Acuña
- Annie Somers Gilchrist (1841–1912)
- Ellen Gilchrist (1935–2024), Starcarbon
- Charlotte Perkins Gilman (1860–1935), Herland
- Florence Magruder Gilmore (1881–1945), The Parting of the Ways
- Susan Gregg Gilmore (born 1961)
- Mark Gilroy (born 1958), Cuts Like A Knife
- Fred Gipson (1908–1973), Old Yeller
- Ellen Glasgow (1873–1945), Virginia
- Julia Glass (born 1956), Three Junes
- Gail Godwin (born 1937), A Mother and Two Daughters
- Tom Godwin (1915–1980), The Survivors
- Herbert Gold (1924–2023), The Man Who Was Not With It
- Arthur Golden (born 1957), Memoirs of a Geisha
- Francisco Goldman (born 1954), The Long Night of White Chickens
- William Goldman (1931–2018), The Princess Bride
- Rebecca Goldstein (born 1950), The Mind-Body Problem
- David Goodis (1917–1967), Down There
- Terry Goodkind (1948–2020), Wizard's First Rule
- Allegra Goodman (born 1967), The Family Markowitz
- Paul Goodman (1911–1972), Making Do
- Marcus Goodrich (1897–1991), Delilah
- H. B. Goodwin (1827–1893), The fortunes of Miss Follen
- Caroline Gordon (1895–1981), Aleck Maury, Sportsman
- Jennifer Anne Gordon, Beautiful, Frightening, and Silent
- Mary Gordon (born 1949), Final Payments
- Ron Goulart (1933–2022), After Things Fell Apart
- William Goyen (1915–1983), The Fair Sister
- Sue Grafton (1940–2017), "A" is for Alibi
- Seth Grahame-Smith (born 1976)
- Robert Grant (1852–1940), Unleavened Bread
- Shirley Ann Grau (1929–2020), The Keepers of the House
- Charlotte E. Gray (1873–1926), Out of the Mire, The Jericho Road, The Inn by the Sea
- Anna Katharine Green (1846–1935), The Leavenworth Case
- John Green (born 1977), The Fault in Our Stars
- Julien Green (1900–1998), Léviathan (The Dark Journey)
- Vincent S. Green (born 1953), The Price of Victory, Extreme Justice
- Joanne Greenberg (born 1932), I Never Promised You a Rose Garden
- Amy Greene (born 1975), Bloodroot
- Frances Nimmo Greene (1867–1937), The Right of the Strongest
- Sam Greenlee (1930–2014), The Spook Who Sat by the Door
- Andrew Sean Greer (born 1970), The Confessions of Max Tivoli
- Bonnie Greer (1948–2026), Hanging by Her Teeth, Entropy
- William Lindsay Gresham (1909–1962), Nightmare Alley
- Zane Grey (1872–1939), Riders of the Purple Sage
- Eva Kinney Griffith (1852–1918), A Woman's Evangel
- Sutton E. Griggs (1872–1933), The Hindered Hand
- Martha Grimes (born 1931), The Old Contemptibles
- John Grisham (born 1955), The Firm
- Lauren Groff (born 1978), Fates and Furies
- Winston Groom (1943–2020), Forrest Gump
- Patricia Grossman (born 1951), Radiant Daughter
- Michael Grothaus (born 1977), Epiphany Jones
- Nikolai Grozni (born 1973)
- Davis Grubb (1919–1980), The Night of the Hunter
- Lisa Grunwald (born 1959), The Irresistible Henry House
- Lucrecia Guerrero, Chasing Shadows (linked short stories), Tree of Sighs
- Judith Guest (born 1936), Ordinary People
- Allan Gurganus (born 1947), Oldest Living Confederate Widow Tells All
- Naomi Gurian (born 1933)
- David Guterson (born 1956), Snow Falling on Cedars
- A. B. Guthrie Jr. (1901–1991), The Big Sky

== H ==
=== Ha–Ham ===
- John Habberton (1842–1921)
- Jessica Hagedorn (born 1949), Dogeaters
- Jennifer Haigh (born 1968), Mrs. Kimble
- Charles Haldeman (1931–1983)
- Joe Haldeman (born 1943), The Forever War
- Alex Haley (1921–1992), Roots
- James Norman Hall (1887–1951), Mutiny on the Bounty (with Charles Nordhoff)
- Oakley Hall (1920–2008), Warlock
- Brett Halliday (1904–1977), Dividend on Death
- Julie Halpern
- Ada L. Halstead (1861–1901)
- Hilary Thayer Hamann (born 1962), Anthropology of an American Girl
- Jane Hamilton (born 1957), The Book of Ruth
- Laurell K. Hamilton (born 1963), Guilty Pleasures
- Dashiell Hammett (1894–1961), The Maltese Falcon
- Samuel J. Hamrick (1929–2008)
- Cathi Hanauer (born 1962)
- Elizabeth Hand (born 1957), Generation Loss
- Daniel Handler (Lemony Snicket) (born 1970), Watch Your Mouth
- Barry Hannah (1942–2010), Geromino Rex
- Joseph Hansen (1923–2004), Fadeout
- Ron Hansen (born 1947), Mariette in Ecstasy
- Paul Harding (born 1967), Tinkers
- Elizabeth Hardwick (1916–2007), Sleepless Nights
- Arthur Sherburne Hardy (1847–1930), The Wind of Destiny
- Donald Harington (1935–2009), The Cockroaches of Stay More
- Henry Harland (1861–1905), The Cardinal's Snuff-box
- Jean Harlow (1911–1937), Today is Tonight
- Charles L. Harness (1915–2005), The Paradox Men
- Kent Harrington
- Bertha Harris (1937–2005), Lover
- Charlaine Harris (born 1961), The Southern Vampire Mysteries
- Corra May Harris (1869–1935), The Circuit Rider's Wife
- MacDonald Harris (1921–1993), The Balloonist
- E. Lynn Harris (1955–2009), Invisible Life
- Mark Harris (1922–2007), Bang the Drum Slowly
- Thomas Harris (born 1940), The Silence of the Lambs
- Harry Harrison (1925–2012), Make Room! Make Room!
- Jim Harrison (1937–2016), Legends of the Fall
- Kathryn Harrison (born 1961), Exposure
- Kim Harrison (born 1966), Hollows
- Kent Haruf (1943–2014), Plainsong
- Adrienne Harun, A Man Came Out of a Door in the Mountain
- Jon Hassler (1933–2008), Staggerford
- Mary R. Platt Hatch (1848–1935), The Strange Disappearance of Eugene Comstocks
- Amanda Havard (born 1986)
- Allan Havis (born 1951), Clear Blue Silence, Maddie Q, Architects of the Taj Mahal
- John Hawkes (1925–1998), The Lime Twig
- Alexandra Hawkins
- Nathaniel Hawthorne (1804–1864), The Scarlet Letter
- Ernest Haycox (1899–1950), Bugles in the Afternoon
- Shirley Hazzard (1931–2016), The Great Fire
- Shelby Hearon (1931–2016), Owning Jolene
- Peter Hedges (born 1962), What's Eating Gilbert Grape
- Rebecca Heflin (born 1963), Rescuing Lacey
- Ursula Hegi (born 1946), Stones from the River
- Scott Heim (born 1966), Mysterious Skin
- Larry Heinemann (1944–2019), Paco's Story
- Robert A. Heinlein (1907–1988), Stranger in a Strange Land
- Joseph Heller (1923–1999), Catch-22
- Mark Helprin (born 1947), Winter's Tale
- Ernest Hemingway (1899–1961), A Farewell to Arms
- Aleksandar Hemon (born 1964), Nowhere Man
- Helen Hemphill (born 1955)
- Dee Henderson, O'Malley Series
- James Hendryx (1880–1963)
- Geoff Herbach
- Frank Herbert (1920–1986), Dune
- Joseph Hergesheimer (1880–1954), Linda Condon
- Nellie Hermann, The Season of Migration
- Robert Herrick (1868–1938), Web of Life
- John Hersey (1914–1993), A Bell for Adano
- Burton Hersh
- DuBose Heyward (1885–1940), Porgy
- Carl Hiaasen (born 1953), Sick Puppy
- George V. Higgins (1939–1999), The Friends of Eddie Coyle
- Wendy Higgins (born 1977)
- Patricia Highsmith (1921–1995), The Talented Mr. Ripley
- Oscar Hijuelos (1951–2013), The Mambo Kings Play Songs of Love
- Agnes Leonard Hill (1842–1917), Vanquished
- Tony Hillerman (1925–2008), The Blessing Way
- Joe Hilley (born 1956), Sober Justice, Double Take, Electric Beach, Night Rain, The Deposition, What the Red Moon Knows
- Chester Himes (1909–1984), If He Hollers Let Him Go
- S. E. Hinton (born 1948), The Outsiders
- Kathleen Hirsch (born 1953)

=== Hn–Hz ===
- Tami Hoag (born 1959), Ashes to Ashes
- Russell Hoban (1925–2011), Riddley Walker
- Laura Z. Hobson (1900–1986), Gentleman's Agreement
- Allen Hoey (1952–2010), Chasing the Dragon
- Alice Hoffman (born 1952), Practical Magic
- Cara Hoffman, So Much Pretty
- Linda Hogan (born 1947), People of the Whale
- Nancy Holder (born 1953)
- Josiah Gilbert Holland (1819–1881), The Bay-Path
- Jenny Hollowell
- Sheri Holman (born 1966), The Mammoth Cheese
- Mary Jane Holmes (1825–1907), Lena Rivers
- Oliver Wendell Holmes (1809–1894), Elsie Venner
- A. M. Homes (born 1961), The End of Alice
- Ann Hood (born 1956), Somewhere Off the Coast of Maine
- David L. Hoof (born 1945)
- Khaled Hosseini (born 1965), The Kite Runner
- Silas House (born 1971), A Parchment of Leaves
- Blanche Willis Howard (1847–1898), Guenn: A Wave on the Breton Coast
- Linda Howard (born 1950)
- Maureen Howard (1930–2022), Natural History
- E. W. Howe (1853–1937), The Story of a Country Town
- William Dean Howells (1837–1920), The Rise of Silas Lapham
- Elizabeth Hoyt (born 1970)
- George Hrab (born 1971), Spiritual Healing & Balance Through Colonic Regularity”
- Yang Huang (born 1971)
- David Huddle (born 1942), La Tour Dreams of the Wolf Girl
- Barry Hughart (1934–2019), Bridge of Birds
- Langston Hughes (1902–1967), Not Without Laughter
- Mary Vance Humphrey (1838–1916), The Squatter Sovereign
- William Humphrey (1924–1997), Farther Off from Heaven
- Josephine Humphreys (born 1945), Rich in Love
- Samantha Hunt (born 1971), The Invention of Everything Else
- Evan Hunter (1926–2005), Blackboard Jungle
- Jessie Prichard Hunter
- Stephen Hunter (born 1946), Point of Impact
- Fannie Hurst (1885–1968), Imitation of Life
- Zora Neale Hurston (1891–1960), Their Eyes Were Watching God
- Siri Hustvedt (born 1955), The Sorrows of an American
- James Hynes (born 1955), The Lecturer's Tale

== I ==
- David Ignatius (born 1950)
- Greg Iles (1960–2025), The Quiet Game
- Bravig Imbs (1904–1944), The Professor's Wife
- Gary Indiana (1950–2024), Resentment
- Rachel Ingalls (1940–2019), Mrs. Caliban
- William Inge (1913–1973), Good Luck, Miss Wyckoff
- Joseph Holt Ingraham (1809–1860), Lafitte: The Pirate of the Gulf
- Prentiss Ingraham (1843–1904), The Masked Spy
- Robert Inman (1931–2006)
- Lee Irby (born 1963), The Up and Up
- Clifford Irving (1930–2017)
- John Irving (born 1942), The World According to Garp
- Susan Isaacs (born 1943), Compromising Positions
- Lynn Isenberg, My Life Undercover
- Christopher Isherwood (1904–1986), Goodbye to Berlin
- Arturo Islas (1938–1991), The Rain God
- Alan Isler (1934–2010)

== J ==
- Beverley Jackson
- Brenda Jackson
- Charles R. Jackson (1902–1968), The Lost Weekend
- Helen Hunt Jackson (1830–1885), Ramona
- Shirley Jackson (1916–1965), The Haunting of Hill House
- Rona Jaffe (1932–2005), Mazes and Monsters
- John Jakes (1932–2023), North and South
- Henry James (1843–1916), Washington Square
- Will James (1892–1942), Smoky the Cow Horse
- Elizabeth Janeway (1913–2005), Daisy Kenyon
- Tama Janowitz (born 1957), By the Shores of Gitchee Gumee
- Randall Jarrell (1914–1965), Pictures from an Institution
- Rosa Vertner Jeffrey (1828–1894), Woodburn
- Gish Jen (born 1956), Typical American
- Jerry B. Jenkins (born 1949), Left Behind (with Tim LaHaye)
- Gary Jennings (1928–1999), Aztec
- Caroline Howard Jervey (1823–1877), Helen Courtenay's Promise
- Sarah Orne Jewett (1849–1909), The Country of the Pointed Firs
- Ha Jin (born 1956), Waiting
- Adam Johnson (born 1967), Parasites Like Us
- Charles R. Johnson (born 1948), Middle Passage
- Denis Johnson (1949–2017), Fiskadoro
- Diane Johnson (born 1934), Le Divorce
- James Weldon Johnson (1871–1938), The Autobiography of an Ex-Colored Man
- Josephine Winslow Johnson (1910–1990), Now in November
- Joyce Johnson (born 1935), In the Night Café
- Maud Johnson (died 1985)
- Owen Johnson (1878–1952), Stover at Yale
- RM Johnson (born 1968)
- Maria I. Johnston (1835–1921)
- Mary Johnston (1870–1936), To Have and to Hold
- LeRoi Jones (see: Amiri Baraka)
- Edward P. Jones (born 1951), The Known World
- Gayl Jones (born 1949), Corregidora
- James Jones (1921–1977), From Here to Eternity
- Matthew F. Jones (born 19??), A Single Shot
- Stephen Graham Jones (born 1972), The Only Good Indians
- Erica Jong (born 1942), Fear of Flying
- Robert Jordan (1948–2007), The Eye of the World
- Sylvester Judd (1813–1853), Margaret
- Heidi Julavits (born 1968), The Mineral Palace
- Ward Just (1935–2019), Jack Gance

== K ==
- Cihan Kaan (born 1976)
- Stacey Kade, The Ghost and the Goth
- James Otis Kaler (1848–1912), Toby Tyler; or, Ten Weeks with a Circus
- Richard Kalich, The Nihilesthete
- Stuart M. Kaminsky (1934–2009), Cold Red Sunrise
- Joseph Kanon (born 1946), Los Alamos
- MacKinlay Kantor (1904–1977), Andersonville
- Vim Karénine (born 1935), O America!
- Jan Karon (born 1937), At Home in Mitford
- Alma Katsu (born 1959)
- Illana Katz (born 1948)
- John Katzenbach (born 1950), The Madman's Tale
- Charlie Kaufman (born 1958), Antkind
- Janet Kauffman (born 1945), Collaborators
- Bel Kaufman (1911–2014), Up the Down Staircase
- Sue Kaufman (1926–1977), Diary of a Mad Housewife
- John Keeble (born 1944)
- Harry Stephen Keeler (1890–1967), The Riddle of the Traveling Skull
- Clarence Budington Kelland (1881–1964), Dangerous Angel
- Faye Kellerman (born 1952), The Ritual Bath
- Jesse Kellerman (born 1978), The Executor
- Jonathan Kellerman (born 1949), Flesh and Blood
- William Melvin Kelley (1937–2017), A Different Drummer
- Marjorie Kellogg (1922–2005), Tell Me That You Love Me, Junie Moon
- Nic Kelman
- Elmer Kelton (1926–2009), Buffalo Wagons
- Anna Kendrick (born 1985), Scrappy Little Nobody
- John P. Kennedy (1795–1870), Horse-Shoe Robinson
- William Kennedy (born 1928), Ironweed
- Camilla Kenyon (1876–1957), Spanish Doubloons
- Jack Kerouac (1922–1969), On the Road
- Ken Kesey (1935–2001), One Flew Over the Cuckoo's Nest
- Jack Ketchum (1946–2018), The Girl Next Door
- Daniel Keyes (1927–2014), Flowers for Algernon
- Frances Parkinson Keyes (1885–1970), Dinner at Antoine's
- Harriette A. Keyser (1841–1936)
- Sue Monk Kidd (born 1948), The Secret Life of Bees
- Kristy Kiernan
- Karen Kijewski (born 1943), Katwalk
- Haven Kimmel (born 1965), The Solace of Leaving Early
- Jamaica Kincaid (born 1949), Annie John
- Grace King (1852–1932), The Pleasant Ways of St. Médard
- Laurie R. King (born 1952), A Grave Talent
- Stephen King (born 1947), Carrie
- Barbara Kingsolver (born 1955), The Bean Trees
- Maxine Hong Kingston (born 1940), Tripmaster Monkey
- Jeff Kinney (born 1971), Diary of a Wimpy Kid
- Joseph Kirkland (1830–1894), Zury: The Meanest Man in Spring County
- Walter Kirn (born 1962), Thumbsucker
- James Kisner (1947–2008)
- Lisa Kleypas (born 1964), Christmas Eve at Friday Harbor
- Fletcher Knebel (1911–1993), Seven Days in May (with Charles Bailey II)
- John Knowles (1926–2001), A Separate Peace
- Deborah Copaken Kogan (born 1966), The Red Book
- Manuel Komroff (1890–1974), Coronet
- Juliet Kono
- Dean Koontz (born 1945), Whispers
- Cyril Kornbluth, The Space Merchants (with Frederik Pohl
- Jerzy Kosinski (1933–1991), Being There
- William Kotzwinkle (born 1943), The Fan Man
- Eric Kraft (born 1945), What a Piece of Work I Am
- Kieran Kramer
- Larry Kramer (1935–2020), Faggots
- William Krasner (1917–2003)
- Herbert Krause (1905–1976), The Thresher
- Jayne Ann Krentz (born 1948), Sharp Edges
- Gary Krist (born 1957), Extravagance
- Tom Kromer (1906–1969), Waiting for Nothing
- William Kent Krueger (born 1950), Ordinary Grace
- Jim Krusoe (born 1942), The Girl Factory
- R. F. Kuang (born 1996), Babel, or the Necessity of Violence
- Maxine Kumin (1925–2014), Through Dooms of Love
- Lynn Kurland
- Allen Kurzweil (born 1960), A Case of Curiosities
- Rachel Kushner (born 1968), The Flamethrowers

== L ==
- Christopher La Farge (1897–1956), The Sudden Guest
- Oliver La Farge (1901–1963), Laughing Boy
- Ursula K. Le Guin (1929–2018), The Left Hand of Darkness
- Mercedes Lackey (born 1950), Arrows of the Queen
- Ed Lacy (1911–1968), Room To Swing
- R. A. Lafferty (1914–2002), Past Master
- Tim LaHaye (1926–2016), Left Behind (with Jerry B. Jenkins)
- Jhumpa Lahiri (born 1967), The Namesake
- Lori L. Lake (born 1960), Snow Moon Rising
- Harold Lamb (1892–1962), Marching Sands
- Wally Lamb (born 1950), She's Come Undone
- Anne Lamott (born 1954), Crooked Little Heart
- Louis L'Amour (1908–1988), Jubal Sackett
- Woodrow Landfair (born 1982), Land of the Free
- Margaret Landon (1903–1993), Anna and the King of Siam
- W. Patrick Lang (1940–2023), The Butcher's Cleaver
- Jane Langton (1922–2018), The Transcendental Murder
- Joe R. Lansdale (born 1951), The Bottoms
- Ring Lardner (1885–1933), You Know Me Al
- Jeremy Larner (1937–2026), Drive, He Said
- Jeanne Larsen (born 1950), Silk Road
- Nella Larsen (1891–1964), Passing
- Robert Lasner
- Emma Lathen (Martha Hennissart (1929–1997) and Mary Jane
  Latsis (1927–1997)), Murder Against the Grain
- Keith Laumer (1925–1993), The Infinite Cage
- Robert Lawson (1892–1957), Rabbit Hill
- David Leavitt (born 1961), The Lost Language of Cranes
- Lindsey Leavitt (born 1980)
- William Lederer (1912–2009), The Ugly American (with Eugene Burdick)
- Chang-Rae Lee (born 1965), Native Speaker
- Harper Lee (1926–2016), To Kill a Mockingbird
- Minnie Mary Lee (1825–1903)
- Peter Lefcourt (born 1941), The Dreyfus Affair
- Ella Leffland (1931–2024), Rumors of Peace
- Dennis Lehane (born 1966), Mystic River
- Fritz Leiber (1910–1992), A Specter is Haunting Texas
- Murray Leinster (1896–1975), The Greks Bring Gifts
- Brad Leithauser (born 1953), Hence
- Madeleine L'Engle (1918–2007), A Wrinkle in Time
- F.J. Lennon (born 1964)
- J. Robert Lennon (born 1970), Mailman
- Elmore Leonard (1925–2013), Get Shorty
- JT LeRoy (Laura Albert) (born 1965), Sarah
- John Lescroart (born 1948), The Mercy Rule
- Jonathan Lethem (born 1964), Motherless Brooklyn
- Billie Letts (1938–2014), Where the Heart Is
- Jeremy Leven (born 1941), Satan: His Psychotherapy and Cure
- Ira Levin (1929–2007), Rosemary's Baby
- Meyer Levin (1905–1981), Compulsion
- Paul Levine (born 1948), To Speak for the Dead
- Stacey Levine (born 19??), Frances Johnson
- Janet Lewis (1899–1998), The Wife of Martin Guerre
- Sinclair Lewis (1885–1951), Main Street
- Ludwig Lewisohn (1882–1955), The Case of Mr. Crump
- Patricia Lieb (1942–2025)
- Alan Lightman (born 1948), Einstein's Dreams
- Thomas Ligotti (born 1953), My Work Is Not Yet Done
- Doris Lilly (1926–1991)
- Eugene Lim (born 1974)
- Sigrid de Lima (1921–1999), Carnival by the Sea
- Tao Lin (born 1983), Richard Yates
- Joseph C. Lincoln (1870–1944), Rugged Water
- Johanna Lindsey (1952–2019), Fires of Winter
- Elizabeth Linington (1921–1988), Knave of Hearts
- Elinor Lipman (born 1950), The Pursuit of Alice Thrift
- George Lippard (1822–1854), The Quaker City, or The Monks of Monk Hall
- Rosina Lippi (born 1956), Homestead
- Laura Lippman (born 1959), What the Dead Know
- Sam Lipsyte (born 1968), Home Land
- Atticus Lish, Preparation for the Next Life
- David Liss (born 1966), A Conspiracy of Paper
- Robert Littell (born 1935), The Amateur
- Bentley Little (born 1960), The Revelation
- Liesel Litzenburger
- Harold Livingston (1924–2022), The Coasts of the Earth
- Gladys Edson Locke (1887–1945)
- Ross Lockridge Jr. (1914–1948), Raintree County
- Patricia Lockwood (born 1982), No One Is Talking About This
- Saab Lofton
- Anne Logston (born 1962)
- Jack London (1876–1916), The Call of the Wild
- Frank Belknap Long (1901–1994), The Horror from the Hills
- Ki Longfellow (1944–2022), The Secret Magdalene
- Anita Loos (1893–1981), Gentlemen Prefer Blondes
- Bret Lott (born 1958), Jewel
- H. P. Lovecraft (1890–1937), At the Mountains of Madness
- Maud Hart Lovelace (1892–1980), Early Candlelight
- Mrs. I. Lowenberg (1845–1924), The Voices
- Lois Lowry (born 1937), The Giver
- Robert Ludlum (1927–2001), The Bourne Identity
- Amy Lukavics Daughters Unto Devils
- Grace Lumpkin (1891–1980), To Make My Bread
- Alison Lurie (1926–2020), Foreign Affairs
- Anne Bozeman Lyon (1860–1936), No Saint
- Andrew Nelson Lytle (1902–1995), The Velvet Horn

== M ==
=== Ma–Mg ===
- Sarah J. Maas (born 1986), A Court of Thorns and Roses
- John D. MacDonald (1916–1986), The Deep Blue Good-by
- Ross Macdonald (1915–1983), The Moving Target
- Bonnie MacDougal
- Harold MacGrath (1871–1932), The Man on the Box
- Pauline Bradford Mackie (1873-?)
- Joyce MacIver
- Jay MacLarty (1943–2010)
- Norman Maclean (1902–1990), A River Runs Through It
- Sarah MacLean (born 1978), A Rogue By Any Other Name
- Charlotte MacLeod (1922–2005), The Corpse in Oozak's Pond
- Ruth MacLeod (1903–1990), Cheryl Downing: School Nurse
- Susan Elia MacNeal (born 1968)
- Gregory Maguire (born 1954), Wicked: The Life and Times of the Wicked Witch of the West
- Norman Mailer (1923–2007), The Naked and the Dead
- Charles Major (1856–1913), When Knighthood Was in Flower
- Clarence Major (born 1936), Painted Turtle: Woman With Guitar
- Rebecca Makkai (born 1978), The Great Believers
- Bernard Malamud (1914–1986), The Natural
- Thomas Mallon (born 1951), Henry and Clara
- Anne Mallory
- Barry N. Malzberg (1939–2024), Beyond Apollo
- Frederick Manfred (1912–1994), Lord Grizzly
- David Manners (1900–1998)
- Lindsay Maracotta (born 1948)
- William March (1893–1954), The Bad Seed
- Marshall Ryan Maresca (born 1973)
- Dee Marie (born 19??), Sons of Avalon, Merlin’s Prophecy
- Margaret Maron (1938–2021), Bootlegger's Daughter
- John P. Marquand (1893–1960), The Late George Apley
- Carolyn Marsden (born 1950)
- Catherine Marshall (1914–1983), Christy
- Paule Marshall (1929–2019), Brown Girl, Brownstones
- George Madden Martin (1866–1946)
- George R. R. Martin (born 1948), A Game of Thrones
- Steve Martin (born 1945), Shopgirl
- Valerie Martin (born 1948), Mary Reilly
- Carole Maso (born 1955), Defiance
- Bobbie Ann Mason (born 1940), In Country
- F. Van Wyck Mason (1901–1978), Three Harbours
- Richard Matheson (1926–2013), I Am Legend
- Harry Mathews (1930–2017), The Conversions
- Frank C. Matthews (born 1972)
- Peter Matthiessen (1927–2014), At Play in the Fields of the Lord
- Armistead Maupin (born 1944), Tales of the City
- Evan Maxwell
- William Keepers Maxwell Jr. (1908–2000), Time Will Darken It
- Joyce Maynard (born 1953), To Die For
- Anne McCaffrey (1926–2011), Dragonflight
- Robert R. McCammon (born 1952), Boy's Life
- Cormac McCarthy (1933–2023), All the Pretty Horses
- Mary McCarthy (1912–1989), The Group
- Ed McClanahan (1932–2021), Natural Man
- Jill McCorkle (born 1958), novelist and short story writer
- Horace McCoy (1897–1955), They Shoot Horses, Don't They?
- Sarah McCoy (born 1980)
- Elizabeth McCracken (born 1966), The Giant's House
- Sharyn McCrumb (born 1948), The Hangman's Beautiful Daughter
- Carson McCullers (1917–1967), The Heart Is a Lonely Hunter
- George Barr McCutcheon (1866–1928), Brewster's Millions
- Alice McDermott (born 1953), Charming Billy
- Gregory Mcdonald (1937–2008), Fletch
- Joseph McElroy (born 1930), A Smuggler's Bible
- William McFee (1881–1966), Casuals of the Sea
- William P. McGivern (1918–1982), Blondes Die Young
- Thomas McGuane (born 1939), Nothing But Blue Skies
- Jay McInerney (born 1955), Bright Lights, Big City
- Claude McKay (1890–1948), Romance in Marseille
- Richard McKenna (1913–1964), The Sand Pebbles
- Patricia McKillip (1948–2022), The Riddle-Master of Hed
- Reginald McKnight (born 1956), He Sleeps
- Georgie A. Hulse McLeod (1827–1890)
- Janna McMahan
- James McManus (born 1951), Going to the Sun
- Terry McMillan (born 1951), Waiting to Exhale
- Larry McMurtry (1936–2021), Lonesome Dove
- Stephen W. Meader (1892–1977), Boy with a Pack
- Herman Melville (1819–1891), Moby-Dick
- Charles Mergendahl (1919–1959), The Bramble Bush
- Gordon Merrick (1916–1988), The Lord Won't Mind
- Barbara Mertz (1927–2013), Crocodile on the Sandbank
- Lynn Messina
- Claire Messud (born 1966), When the World Was Steady
- Grace Metalious (1924–1964), Peyton Place
- Philipp Meyer (born 1974)
- Stephenie Meyer (born 1973), Twilight

=== Mh–Mz ===
- Leonard Michaels (1933–2003), The Men's Club
- Oscar Micheaux (1884–1951)
- DeLauné Michel
- James A. Michener (1907–1997), Tales of the South Pacific
- Mrs. Alex. McVeigh Miller (1850–1937)
- Caroline Miller (1903–1992), Lamb in His Bosom
- Henry Miller (1891–1980), Tropic of Cancer
- Mary Miller
- May Merrill Miller (1894–1975)
- Rex Miller (1939–2004), Slob
- Sue Miller (born 1943), The Good Mother
- Susan Cummins Miller
- Walter M. Miller Jr. (1923–1996), A Canticle for Leibowitz
- Lydia Millet (born 1968), My Happy Life
- Steven Millhauser (born 1943), Martin Dressler
- David Milofsky
- Anchee Min (born 1957), Becoming Madame Mao
- Stephen Minot (1927–2010), Surviving the Flood
- Susan Minot (born 1956), Evening
- Meilin Miranda
- Jacquelyn Mitchard (born 1955), The Deep End of the Ocean
- Donald Grant Mitchell (1822–1908), Dr. Johns
- Margaret Mitchell (1900–1949), Gone with the Wind
- S. Weir Mitchell (1829–1914), Hugh Wynne, Free Quaker
- Sam Moffie (born 1960)
- Carol Moldaw (born 1956)
- N. Scott Momaday (1934–2024), House Made of Dawn
- Anne Shannon Monroe (1873–1942), Feelin' Fine
- Adrienne Monson (born 1983)
- Martha Moody (born 1955)
- Rick Moody (born 1961), The Ice Storm
- Christopher Moore (born 1957), Lamb: The Gospel According to Biff, Christ's Childhood Pal
- Lorrie Moore (born 1957), Who Will Run the Frog Hospital?
- Ruth Moore (1903–1989), Spoonhandle
- Susanna Moore (born 1947), In the Cut
- Ward Moore (1903–1978), Bring the Jubilee
- Jeannie Blackburn Moran (1842–1929), Miss Washington, of Virginia
- A. R. Morlan (1958–2016)
- Christopher Morley (1890–1957), Kitty Foyle
- Mary McGarry Morris (born 1943), Songs In Ordinary Time
- Rooster Morris (born 1955), Axle Galench and the Gate of No Return, Axle Galench in Search of Barnsfoggon
- Wright Morris (1910–1998), Plains Song
- Toni Morrison (1931–2019), Beloved
- Bradford Morrow (born 1951), Trinity Fields
- Honoré Willsie Morrow (1880–1940), The Great Captain trilogy
- James K. Morrow (born 1947), Towing Jehovah
- Howard Frank Mosher (1942–2017), A Stranger in the Kingdom
- Ottessa Moshfegh (born 1981), My Year of Rest and Relaxation
- Hannah Moskowitz (born 1991)
- Stefan Mosley (born 1952)
- Walter Mosley (born 1952), Devil in a Blue Dress
- Dow Mossman (born 1944), The Stones of Summer
- Willard Motley (1912–1965), Knock on Any Door
- Bharati Mukherjee (1940–2017), Jasmine
- Clarence E. Mulford (1883–1956), Hopalong Cassidy
- Marcia Muller (born 1944), Wolf in the Shadows
- Mary Noailles Murfree (1850–1922), The Amulet
- Sabina Murray (born 1968), A Carnivore's Inquiry
- John Myers Myers (1906–1988), Silverlock
- Anton Myrer (1922–1996), Once an Eagle

== N ==
- Vladimir Nabokov (1899–1977), Lolita
- Robert Nathan (1894–1985), Portrait of Jennie
- Gloria Naylor (1950–2016), The Women of Brewster Place
- Shira Nayman (born 1960)
- John Neal (1793–1876), Rachel Dyer: a North American Story
- Antonya Nelson (born 1961), Talking in Bed
- Howard Nemerov (1920–1991), The Homecoming Game
- Arthur Nersesian (born 1958), The Fuck-Up
- Katherine Neville (born 1945), The Eight
- Fae Myenne Ng (born 1957), Bone
- John Nichols (1940–2023), The Milagro Beanfield War
- Kerry Nietz
- Anaïs Nin (1903–1977), A Spy in the House of Love
- Larry Niven (born 1938), Ringworld
- Lewis Nordan (1939–2012), The Sharpshooter Blues
- Charles Nordhoff (1887–1947), Mutiny on the Bounty (with James Norman Hall)
- Gurney Norman (1937–2025), Divine Right's Trip
- Howard Norman (born 1949), The Bird Artist
- John Norman (born 1931), Tarnsman of Gor
- Charles Gilman Norris (1881–1945), Bricks Without Straw
- Frank Norris (1870–1902), McTeague
- Kathleen Norris (1880–1966), Second Hand Wife
- Harold Norse (1916–2009), Beat Hotel
- Andre Norton (1912–2005), The Witch World
- Mary E. Norton (1833–1916), Fanny's Autobiography: A Story of Home Missionary Life on the Frontier
- Craig Nova (born 1945), The Good Son
- Josip Novakovich (born 1956), April Fool's Day
- Sigrid Nunez (born 1951), The Friend
- Mark Nykanen

== O ==
- Joyce Carol Oates (born 1938), them
- Tim O'Brien (born 1946), Going After Cacciato
- Edwin O'Connor (1918–1968), The Last Hurrah
- Flannery O'Connor (1925–1964), The Violent Bear It Away
- Varley O'Connor
- Shawn Thomas Odyssey
- Marie Conway Oemler (1879–1932)
- Chris Offutt (born 1958), The Good Brother
- Margaret Astrid Lindholm Ogden (born 1952), writes as Robin Hobb and Megan Lindholm
- John O'Hara (1905–1970), Appointment in Samarra
- Bayo Ojikutu (born 1971), Free Burning
- Daniel Olivas (born 1959), The Book of Want
- Lauren Oliver (born 1982), Delirium
- Robert Olmstead (born 1954), A Trail of Heart's Blood Wherever We Go
- Stewart O'Nan (born 1961), The Speed Queen
- Terry a. O'Neal (born 1973), Sweet Lavender
- Tommy Orange (born 1982), There There
- Terry Oroszi (born 1966)
- Julie Orringer (born 1973), The Invisible Bridge
- Martha Ostenso (1900–1963), Wild Geese
- Fannie Ostrander (1859–1921)
- Vincent O'Sullivan (1869–1940), The Green Window
- Rodrigues Ottolengui (1861–1937), An Artist in Crime
- Gwendolen Overton (1874/76–1958)
- Iris Owens (1929–2008), After Claude
- Janis Owens (born 1960)
- Ruth Ozeki (born 1956), A Tale for the Time Being
- Cynthia Ozick (born 1928), The Puttermesser Papers

== P ==
- Alison Pace
- William Packard (1933–2002), Saturday Night at San Marcos
- Thomas Nelson Page (1853–1952), On Newfound River
- Michelle Paisley
- Bernadette Pajer, Professor Bradshaw Mysteries
- Chuck Palahniuk (born 1962), Fight Club
- Allison Pang
- Edgar Pangborn (1909–1976), Davy
- Alexei Panshin (1940–2022), Rite of Passage
- Christopher Paolini (born 1983), The Inheritance Cycle
- Sara Paretsky (born 1947), Indemnity Only
- Jay Parini (born 1948), The Last Station
- Jane Marsh Parker (1836–1913), The Midnight Cry
- Robert B. Parker (1932–2010), Crimson Joy
- T. Jefferson Parker (born 1953), Laguna Heat
- Anne Parrish (1888–1957), The Perennial Bachelor
- Ann Patchett (born 1963), Bel Canto
- James Patterson (born 1947), Along Came a Spider
- Grace Espy Patton (1896–1904), The Chalchihuitl
- Lisa Patton (born 1958), Whistlin' Dixie in a Nor'easter
- Paul Jessup (born 1977)
- Elliot Paul (1891–1958), Concert Pitch
- James Kirke Paulding (1778–1860), The Dutchman's Fireside
- Gary Paulsen (1939–2021), Hatchet
- Bill Pearson (born 1938), Drifter's Detour
- Ridley Pearson (born 1953), Undercurrents
- T. R. Pearson (born 1956), Blue Ridge
- Howard Pease (1894–1974), The Tod Moran Mysteries
- Robert Newton Peck (1928–2020), A Day No Pigs Would Die
- Laura Pedersen (born 1965), Hallie Palmer
- Ern Pedler (1914–1989)
- Janet Peery (born 1948), The River Beyond the World
- Don Pendleton (1927–1995), War Against the Mafia
- Walker Percy (1916–1990), The Moviegoer
- Frank E. Peretti (born 1951), This Present Darkness
- Marisha Pessl (born 1977), Special Topics in Calamity Physics
- Julia Peterkin (1880–1961), Scarlet Sister Mary
- Glen Peters (born 1951), Where the Nights Smell Like Bread
- Ann Petry (1931–1997), The Narrows
- Arthur Phillips (born 1969), Prague
- David Graham Phillips (1867–1911), Susan Lenox (Her Fall and Rise)
- Jayne Anne Phillips (born 1952), Machine Dreams
- Hannah Maynard Pickard (1812–1844)
- Jodi Picoult (born 1966), The Pact
- Marge Piercy (born 1936), He, She And It
- Mary Hayden Green Pike (1824–1898), Ida May
- Darryl Pinckney (born 1953), High Cotton
- Josephine Pinckney (1895–1957), Three O'Clock Dinner
- Daniel Pinkwater (born 1941), The Snarkout Boys and the Avocado of Death
- H. Beam Piper (1904–1964), Little Fuzzy
- Sylvia Plath (1932–1963), The Bell Jar
- George Plimpton (1927–2003), The Curious Case of Sidd Finch
- Michael Pocalyko (born 1954), The Navigator
- Edgar Allan Poe (1809–1849), The Narrative of Arthur Gordon Pym of Nantucket
- Frederik Pohl (1919–2013), Gateway
- Donald Ray Pollock (born 1954), The Devil All the Time
- Darryl Ponicsan (born 1938), The Last Detail
- Ernest Poole (1880–1950), His Family
- William Lee Popham (1885–1953)
- Eleanor H. Porter (1868–1920), Pollyanna
- Katherine Anne Porter (1890–1980), Ship of Fools
- Rebecca N. Porter (1883–1963), Raisin Valley
- Rose Porter (1845–1906), Summer Drift-Wood for the Winter Fire
- Charles Portis (1933–2020), True Grit
- Melville Davisson Post (1871–1930), The Nameless Thing
- Chaim Potok (1929–2002), The Chosen
- Jean Potts (1910–1999), Go, Lovely Rose
- Jerry Pournelle (1933–2017), The Endless Frontier
- Dawn Powell (1896–1965), The Wicked Pavilion
- Padgett Powell (born 1952), Edisto
- Richard P. Powell (1908–1999), The Philadelphian
- J. F. Powers (1917–1999), Morte d'Urban
- Richard Powers (born 1957), The Gold Bug Variations
- Emily Prager (born 1952), Clea & Zeus Divorce
- Theodore Pratt (1901–1969), Mr. Limpet
- Douglas Preston (born 1956), Relic
- Charles F. Price (born 1938)
- Eugenia Price (1916–1996), The Beloved Invader
- Nicholas A. Price (born 1962), Adventures in Trichology
- Reynolds Price (1933–2011), Kate Vaiden
- Richard Price (born 1949), Freedomland
- Joseph Di Prisco
- Frederic Prokosch (1908–1989), The Seven Who Fled
- Bill Pronzini (born 1943), Hoodwink
- Francine Prose (born 1947), Blue Angel
- E. Annie Proulx (born 1935), The Shipping News
- Olive Higgins Prouty (1882–1974), Stella Dallas
- James Purdy (1923–2009), Cabot Wright Begins
- Mario Puzo (1920–1999), The Godfather
- Thomas Pynchon (born 1937), Gravity's Rainbow

== Q ==
- Qiu Xiaolong (born 1953), Death of a Red Heroine
- Jamie Quatro
- Ellery Queen (Frederic Dannay (1905–1982) and
  Manfred B. Lee (1905–1971)), The Greek Coffin Mystery
- John Herbert Quick (1861–1925), Vandemark's Folly
- Anna Quindlen (born 1952), Black and Blue
- Daniel Quinn (1935–2018), Ishmael
- Julia Quinn (born 1970), The Duke and I
- Kate Quinn, The Alice Network
- Sally Quinn (born 1941), Regrets Only

== R ==
- Kris Radish (born 1953)
- Lulah Ragsdale (1861–1953), Miss Dulcie from Dixie
- Ayn Rand (1905–1982), Atlas Shrugged
- Alice Randall (born 1959), The Wind Done Gone
- Rebecca Rasmussen
- Marjorie Kinnan Rawlings (1896–1953), The Yearling
- Wilson Rawls (1913–1984), Where the Red Fern Grows
- Chet Raymo (born 1936), The Dork of Cork
- John Rechy (born 1931), City of Night
- Jaclyn Reding (born 1966), The Secret Gift
- Ishmael Reed (born 1938), Mumbo Jumbo
- Arthur B. Reeve (1880–1936), Craig Kennedy Listens In
- Ben Rehder
- Kathy Reichs (born 1950), Déjà Dead
- Thomas Mayne Reid (1818–1883), The Rifle Rangers
- Emma May Alexander Reinertsen (1853–1920), Five Cousins in California
- Amanda Renee
- Frederick Reuss (born 1960), Mohr
- Nina Revoyr (born 1969), Southland
- Sheri Reynolds (born 1967), The Rapture of Canaan
- Eugene Manlove Rhodes (1869–1934), Bransford in Arcadia
- Anne Rice (1941–2021), Interview with the Vampire
- Craig Rice (1908–1957), The Corpse Steps Out
- E. J. Richmond (1825–1918), The Jewelled Serpent
- Conrad Richter (1890–1968), The Town
- Mary Roberts Rinehart (1876–1958), The Circular Staircase
- Caris Roane
- Ronald Clair Roat (1946–2013)
- Harold Robbins (1916–1997), The Carpetbaggers
- Tom Robbins (1932–2025), Even Cowgirls Get the Blues
- Elizabeth Madox Roberts (1881–1941), The Great Meadow
- Kenneth Roberts (1885–1957), Northwest Passage
- Nora Roberts (born 1950), Irish Thoroughbred
- Kim Stanley Robinson (born 1952), Red Mars
- Marilynne Robinson (born 1943), Housekeeping
- Mary Robison (born 1949), Why Did I Ever
- Lucia St. Clair Robson (born 1942), Ride the Wind
- Tony R. Rodriguez
- Edward Payson Roe (1838–1888), Barriers Burned Away
- Lettie Hamlet Rogers (1917–1957)
- Joel Townsley Rogers (1896–1984), The Red Right Hand
- Adelaide Day Rollston (1854–1941)
- O. E. Rølvaag (1876–1931), Giants in the Earth
- Judith Rossner (1935–2005), Looking for Mr. Goodbar
- Leo Rosten (1908–1997), Captain Newman, M.D.
- Henry Roth (1906–1995), Call It Sleep
- Philip Roth (1933–2018), Portnoy's Complaint
- Veronica Roth (born 1988), Divergent
- Susanna Rowson (1762–1824), Charlotte Temple
- S. J. Rozan (born 1950), Winter and Night
- Robert Ruark (1915–1965), Uhuru
- Jack Rudloe (born 1943), Potluck
- Rudy Ruiz, The Resurrection of Fulgencio Ramirez: A Novel
- Norman Rush (born 1933), Mating
- Rebecca Rush (1779–1850), Kelroy
- Joanna Russ (1937–2011), The Female Man
- Karen Russell (born 1981), Swamplandia!
- Gerri Russell (born 1962), The Warrior Trainer
- Mary Doria Russell (born 1950), The Sparrow
- Richard Russo (born 1949), Empire Falls
- Carl Hancock Rux, Asphalt
- Marah Ellis Ryan (1860–1934), Told in the Hills

== S ==
=== Sa–Sg ===
- Noel Everingham Sainsbury (1884–1955)
- J. D. Salinger (1919–2010), The Catcher in the Rye
- James Sallis (1944–2026), Long-Legged Fly
- James Salter (1925–2015), A Sport and a Pastime
- Edgar Saltus (1855–1921), Mr. Incoul's Misadventure
- Lawrence Sanders (1920–1998), The Anderson Tapes
- Brandon Sanderson (born 1975), Mistborn
- John Sandford (born 1944), Rules of Prey
- Mari Sandoz (1896–1966), Slogum House
- William Saroyan (1908–1981), The Human Comedy
- May Sarton (1912–1995), Faithful are the Wounds
- Richard Satterlie
- John Saul (born 1942), Suffer the Children
- George Saunders (born 1958), The Brief and Frightening Reign of Phil
- Willard Savoy (1916–1976)
- John Sayles (born 1950), Pride of the Bimbos
- Jack Schaefer (1907–1991), Shane
- Rebecca Scherm
- Cathleen Schine (born 1953), Rameau's Niece
- Mark Schorer (1908–1977), A House Too Old
- Melissa Schroeder
- Budd Schulberg (1914–2009), What Makes Sammy Run?
- Christine Schutt (born 19??), All Souls
- Victoria Schwab (born 1987), Vicious
- Lynne Sharon Schwartz (born 1939), Disturbances in the Field
- Sandra Scofield (born 1943), Beyond Deserving
- Sandra Scoppettone (born 1936), Suzuki Beane
- Daniel Scott (born 1963), Valedictory
- Evelyn Scott (1893–1963), A Calendar of Sin
- Joanna Scott (born 1960), The Manikin
- Allan Seager (1906–1968), Amos Berry
- Molly Elliot Seawell (1860–1916), The House of Egremont
- Alice Sebold (born 1963), The Lovely Bones
- Catharine Sedgwick (1789–1867), Hope Leslie
- Carolyn See (1934–2016), Making History
- Erich Segal (1937–2010), Love Story
- Lore Segal (1928–2024), Other People's Houses
- Hubert Selby Jr. (1928–2004), Last Exit to Brooklyn
- Nachman Seltzer (born 1976)
- Danzy Senna (born 1970), Caucasia
- Richard Setlowe (1933–2022)
- Anya Seton (1904–1990), Green Darkness
- Mary Lee Settle (1918–2005), Blood Tie
- Elizabeth Sewell (1919–2001)

=== Sh–Ss ===
- Michael Shaara (1928–1988), The Killer Angels
- Laurence Shames (born 1951), Florida Straits
- Ntozake Shange (1948–2018), Betsey Brown
- Emma Augusta Sharkey (1858–1902), The Richmond Secret
- Akhil Sharma (born 1971), An Obedient Father
- Irwin Shaw (1913–1984), Rich Man, Poor Man
- Robert Shea (1933–1994), The Illuminatus! Trilogy (with Robert Anton Wilson)
- Amy Shearn (born 1979)
- Wilfrid Sheed (1930–2011), Square's Progress
- Anna Sheehan, A Long, Long Sleep
- Sidney Sheldon (1917–2007), The Naked Face
- Samuel Shellabarger (1888–1954), Captain from Castile
- Jim Shepard (born 1956), Lights Out in the Reptile House
- Carol Shields (1935–2003), The Stone Diaries
- Anita Shreve (1946–2018), The Weight of Water
- Susan Shreve (born 1939), A Country of Strangers
- Lionel Shriver (born 1957), We Need to Talk About Kevin
- Gary Shteyngart (born 1972), The Russian Debutante's Handbook
- Anne Rivers Siddons (1936–2019), Peachtree Road
- Clancy Sigal (1926–2017), Going Away
- Leslie Marmon Silko (born 1948), Ceremony
- Robert Silverberg (born 1935), A Time of Changes
- Clifford D. Simak (1904–1988), City
- Dan Simmons (1948–2026), Hyperion
- William Gilmore Simms (1806–1870), The Sword and the Distaff
- Mona Simpson (born 1957), Anywhere But Here
- Elizabeth Sims (born 1957), Damn Straight
- Upton Sinclair (1878–1968), The Jungle
- Isaac Bashevis Singer (1902–1991), Enemies, a Love Story
- Israel Joshua Singer (1893–1944), The Brothers Ashkenazi
- Joan Slonczewski (born 1956), A Door into Ocean
- Jane Smiley (born 1949), A Thousand Acres
- Betty Smith (1896–1972), A Tree Grows in Brooklyn
- E. E. Smith (1890–1965), First Lensman
- Elizabeth Oakes Smith (1806–1893), The Western Captive
- Francis Hopkinson Smith (1838–1915), Colonel Carter of Cartersville
- H. Allen Smith (1907–1976), Rhubarb
- Haywood Smith
- Katy Simpson Smith (born 1985)
- Lee Smith (born 1944), Fair and Tender Ladies
- Thorne Smith (1892–1934), Topper
- Charles A. Smythwick
- Zilpha Keatley Snyder (1927–2014), The Headless Cupid
- Paul Spencer Sochaczewski (born 1974), Redheads
- Susan Sontag (1933–2004), In America
- Virginia Sorensen (1912–1991), On This Star
- Christopher Sorrentino (born 1963), Trance
- Gilbert Sorrentino (1929–2006), Mulligan Stew
- Gary Soto (born 1952), Buried Onions
- Terry Southern (1924–1995), The Magic Christian
- E. D. E. N. Southworth (1819–1899), The Hidden Hand
- W. M. Spackman (1905–1980), An Armful of Warm Girl
- Joshua Spanogle
- R. Clifton Spargo (born 1965), Beautiful Fools, The Last Affair of Zelda and Scott Fitzgerald
- Frank H. Spearman (1859–1937), Whispering Smith
- Scott Spencer (born 1945), Endless Love
- Mickey Spillane (1918–2006), I, the Jury
- Norman Spinrad (born 1940), The Iron Dream
- Harriet Elizabeth Prescott Spofford (1835–1921), Sir Rohan's Ghost

=== St–Sz ===
- David Derek Stacton (1925–1968), On a Balcony
- Jean Stafford (1915–1979), Boston Adventure
- Zoje Stage, Baby Teeth
- Clinton H. Stagg (1888–1916)
- Jason Starr (born 1966), The Follower
- Kai Starr
- Danielle Steel (born 1947), Family Album
- Wallace Stegner (1909–1993), Angle of Repose
- Gertrude Stein (1874–1946), The Autobiography of Alice B. Toklas
- John Steinbeck (1902–1968), The Grapes of Wrath
- Darcey Steinke (born 1964), Jesus Saves
- Ann Sophia Stephens (1810–1886), Malaeska: The Indian Wife of the White Hunter
- Harold Stephens (1926–2021), Who Needs a Road?
- Neal Stephenson (born 1959), Snow Crash
- Bruce Sterling (born 1954), Islands in the Net
- Richard G. Stern (1928–2013), Golk
- Steve Stern, The Angel of Forgetfulness
- Brooke Stevens, Tattoo Girl
- George R. Stewart (1895–1980), Earth Abides
- Frederic Jesup Stimson (1855–1943), The Crime of Henry Vane
- R. L. Stine (born 1943), Monster Blood
- Frank R. Stockton (1834–1902), Rudder Grange
- Louise Stockton (1838–1914), Dorothea
- Mary Stolz (1920–2006), The Edge of Next Year
- Grace Zaring Stone (1891–1991), The Bitter Tea of General Yen
- Irving Stone (1903–1989), The Agony and the Ecstasy
- Robert Stone (1937–2015), Dog Soldiers
- Phil Stong (1899–1957), State Fair
- Hans Otto Storm (1895–1941), Pity the Tyrant
- Rex Stout (1886–1975), Fer-de-Lance
- Harriet Beecher Stowe (1811–1896), Uncle Tom's Cabin
- Edward Stratemeyer (1862–1930), The Rover Boys at School
- Gene Stratton-Porter (1863–1924), A Girl of the Limberlost
- Peter Straub (1943–2022), Ghost Story
- Darin Strauss (born 1970), The Real McCoy
- Edward Streeter (1891–1976), Father of the Bride
- John Strelecky (born 1969), The Big Five for Life – Leadership's Greatest Secret
- T. S. Stribling (1881–1965), The Store
- Elizabeth Strout (born 1956), Amy and Isabelle
- Jesse Stuart (1906–1984), Taps for Private Tussie
- Theodore Sturgeon (1918–1985), More Than Human
- William Styron (1925–2006), The Confessions of Nat Turner
- Ronald Sukenick (1932–2004), Up
- Cid Ricketts Sumner (1890–1970), Quality
- Jacqueline Susann (1918–1974), Valley of the Dolls
- Van Tassel Sutphen (1861–1945)
- Harvey Swados (1920–1972), Out Went the Candle
- Glendon Swarthout (1918–1992), The Shootist

== T ==
- Gladys Taber (1899–1980), Stillmeadow books
- Michael Talbot (1953–1992), The Bog
- Elizabeth Tallent (born 1954), Museum Pieces
- Amy Tan (born 1952), The Joy Luck Club
- Booth Tarkington (1869–1946), The Magnificent Ambersons
- Donna Tartt (born 1963), The Secret History
- Bayard Taylor (1825–1878), Hanna Thurston
- Kathrine Taylor (1903–1996), Address Unknown
- Peter Taylor (1917–1994), A Summons to Memphis
- Phoebe Atwood Taylor (1909–1976), The Cape Cod Mystery
- Robert Lewis Taylor (1912–1998), The Travels of Jaimie McPheeters
- Angeline Teal (1842–1913), The Speaker of the House
- William Tenn (1920–2010), Of Men and Monsters
- Tabitha Gilman Tenney (1762–1837)
- Mary Virginia Terhune (1830–1922), Alone
- Kathleen Tessaro (born 1965), Rare Objects
- Walter Tevis (1928–1984), The Hustler
- Steve Thayer (born 1953)
- Paul Theroux (born 1941), The Mosquito Coast
- Angie Thomas (born 1988), The Hate U Give
- Carlene Thompson (born 1952)
- Clara M. Thompson (1830s – unknown)
- Daniel Pierce Thompson (1795–1868), The Green Mountain Boys
- Hunter S. Thompson (1937–2005), Fear and Loathing in Las Vegas
- Jim Thompson (1906–1977), The Killer Inside Me
- Maurice Thompson (1844–1901), Alice of Old Vincennes
- Melanie Rae Thon (born 1957), Meteors in August
- Rufi Thorpe (born 1985), Margo's Got Money Troubles
- James Thurber (1894–1961), The 13 Clocks
- Marian Thurm (born 1952)
- Wallace Thurman (1902–1934), The Blacker the Berry
- Ernest Tidyman (1928–1984), Shaft
- Ronald Tierney (1944–2017)
- Meg Tilly (born 1960)
- Ada Josephine Todd (1858–1904), The Vacation Club
- Caroline and Charles Todd
- John Kennedy Toole (1937–1969), A Confederacy of Dunces
- Jane Toombs (died 2014)
- Jean Toomer (1894–1967), Cane
- Joseph Torchia (1948–1996)
- Alessandra Torre
- Nick Tosches (1949–2019), In the Hand of Dante
- Paul A. Toth (born 1964)
- Albion W. Tourgée (1838–1905), A Fool's Errand
- Arthur Train (1875–1945), Yankee Lawyer: The Autobiography of Ephraim Tutt
- Clara Augusta Jones Trask (1839–1905), Patience Pettigrew's perplexities
- Lawrence Treat (1903–1998), V as in Victim
- Trevanian (1931–2005), The Eiger Sanction
- Emma Trevayne
- Calvin Trillin (born 1935), Runestruck
- Dalton Trumbo (1905–1976), Johnny Got His Gun
- Danielle Trussoni (born 1973), Angelology
- George Tucker (1775–1861), A Voyage to the Moon
- John R. Tunis (1889–1975), The Kid From Tomkinsville
- Scott Turow (born 1949), Presumed Innocent
- Harry Turtledove (born 1949), In the Balance
- Mark Twain (1835–1910), Adventures of Huckleberry Finn
- Anne Tyler (born 1941), The Accidental Tourist
- Royall Tyler (1757–1826), The Algerine Captive

== U ==
- Brady Udall (born c. 1971), The Miracle Life of Edgar Mint
- Dorothy Uhnak (1933–2006), The Bait
- James Michael Ullman (1925–1997), The Neon Haystack
- James Ramsey Ullman (1907–1971)
- Douglas Unger (born 1952), Leaving the Land
- John Updike (1932–2009), Rabbit, Run
- Leon Uris (1924–2003), Exodus
- Luís Alberto Urrea (born 1955), In Search of Snow
- Lois Utz (1932–1986)

== V ==
- Andrew Vachss (1942–2021), Strega
- Roberto Valero (1955–1994)
- S. S. Van Dine (1888–1939), The Benson Murder Case
- Jack Vance (1916–2013), The Killing Machine
- Louis Joseph Vance (1879–1933), The Lone Wolf
- Martha Van Marter (1839–1931), Jessie in Switzerland
- John Varley (1947–2025), The Ophiuchi Hotline
- Michael Vatikiotis (born 1957)
- Gore Vidal (1925–2012), Burr
- Tony Vigorito, Nine Kinds of Naked
- Gerald Vizenor (born 1934), Darkness in Saint Louis Bearheart
- William T. Vollmann (born 1959), Europe Central
- Kurt Vonnegut Jr. (1922–2007), Slaughterhouse-Five

== W ==
- Madge Morris Wagner (1862–1924), A Titled Plebeian
- David Wagoner (1926–2021), The Escape Artist
- Alice Walker (born 1944), The Color Purple
- Margaret Walker (1915–1998), Jubilee
- David Foster Wallace (1962–2008), Infinite Jest
- Irving Wallace (1916–1990), The Fan Club
- Lew Wallace (1827–1905), Ben-Hur
- Edward Lewis Wallant (1926–1962), The Tenants of Moonbloom
- Robert James Waller (1939–2017), The Bridges of Madison County
- Douglass Wallop (1920–1985), The Year the Yankees Lost the Pennant
- Joseph Wambaugh (1937–2025), The Choirboys
- Walter Wangerin Jr. (1944–2017), The Book of the Dun Cow
- Elizabeth Stuart Phelps Ward (1844–1911), The Gates Ajar
- Jesmyn Ward (born 1977), Salvage the Bones
- William Ware (1797–1852), Zenobia; or, The Fall of Palmyra
- Catherine Anne Warfield (1816–1877), The Household of Bouverie
- Charles Dudley Warner (1829–1900), The Gilded Age (with Mark Twain)
- Gertrude Chandler Warner (1890–1979), The Boxcar Children
- Susan Warner (1819–1895), The Wide, Wide World
- Kimberly Warner-Cohen (born 1978)
- Robert Penn Warren (1905–1989), All the King's Men
- Marion Foster Washburne (1863–1944), The House on the North Shore
- Larry Watson (born 1947), Montana 1948
- Kate Watterson (novels fl. 2007–2018)
- Hillary Waugh (1920–2008), Last Seen Wearing...
- John Van Alstyne Weaver (1893–1938)
- Will Weaver (born 1950), Red Earth, White Earth
- Charles Webb (1939–2020), The Graduate
- Katharine Weber (born 1955), Triangle
- Jean Webster (1876–1916), Daddy-Long-Legs
- Theodore Weesner (1935–2015), The Car Thief
- Jerome Weidman (1913–1998), I Can Get It for You Wholesale
- James Welch (1940–2003), Fools Crow
- Manly Wade Wellman (1903–1986), The Old Gods Waken
- Rebecca Wells (born 1952), Divine Secrets of the Ya-Ya Sisterhood
- Eudora Welty (1909–2001), The Optimist's Daughter
- Glenway Wescott (1901–1987), The Grandmothers
- Debbie Lee Wesselmann (born 20th century)
- Dorothy West (1907–1998), The Living Is Easy
- Jessamyn West (1902–1984), The Massacre at Fall Creek
- Nathanael West (1903–1940), The Day of the Locust
- Paul West (1930–2015), The Women of Whitechapel and Jack the Ripper
- Donald E. Westlake (1933–2008), God Save the Mark
- Edith Wharton (1862–1937), The Age of Innocence
- William Wharton (1925–2008), Birdy
- Edith Wherry (1876–1961),The Red Lantern
- E. B. White (1899–1985), Charlotte's Web
- Edmund White (1940–2025), A Boy's Own Story
- Randy Wayne White (born 1950), Sanibel Flats
- Stewart Edward White (1873–1946), The Claim Jumpers
- Colson Whitehead (born 1969), The Intuitionist
- Brand Whitlock (1869–1934), The Turn of the Balance
- Phyllis A. Whitney (1903–2008), The Mystery of the Haunted Pool
- Edward Whittemore (1933–1995), Sinai Tapestry
- John Edgar Wideman (born 1941), Philadelphia Fire
- Elie Wiesel (1928–2016), Twilight
- Kate Douglas Wiggin (1856–1923), Rebecca of Sunnybrook Farm
- Marianne Wiggins (born 1947), Evidence of Things Unseen
- James Wilcox (born 1949), Modern Baptists
- Laura Ingalls Wilder (1867–1957), Little House on the Prairie
- Thornton Wilder (1897–1975), The Bridge of San Luis Rey
- Kate Wilhelm (1928–2018), Where Late the Sweet Birds Sang
- Christopher Willard (born 1960), Garbage Head
- Charles Willeford (1919–1988), Miami Blues
- Alicia D. Williams (born 1970), Genesis Begins Again
- Ben Ames Williams (1889–1953), House Divided
- John A. Williams (1925–2015), The Man Who Cried I Am
- John Williams (1922–1994), Stoner
- Joy Williams (born 1944), State of Grace
- Philip Lee Williams (born 1950), Elegies for the Water
- Tennessee Williams (1911–1983), The Roman Spring of Mrs. Stone
- Thomas Williams (1926–1990), The Hair of Harold Roux
- Jack Williamson (1908–2006), The Humanoid Touch
- Calder Willingham (1922–1995), End as a Man
- Connie Willis (born 1945), Doomsday Book
- Harriet E. Wilson (1825–1900), Our Nig; or Sketches from the Life of a Free Black
- Harry Leon Wilson (1867–1919), Ruggles of Red Gap
- Margaret Wilson (1882–1973), The Able McLaughlins
- Robert Anton Wilson (1932–2007), The Illuminatus! Trilogy (with Robert Shea)
- Sloan Wilson (1920–2003), The Man in the Gray Flannel Suit
- Mark Winegardner (born 1961), Crooked River Burning
- Crystal Lacey Winslow (born 20th century)
- Don Winslow (born 1953), The Power of the Dog
- Annie Steger Winston (1862–1927), The Deeper Voice
- Theodore Winthrop (1828–1861), John Brent
- Owen Wister (1860–1938), The Virginian
- Larry Woiwode (1941–2022), Beyond the Bedroom Wall
- Emma Wolf (1865–1932), A Prodigal in Love
- Gene Wolfe (1931–2019), The Book of the New Sun
- Thomas Wolfe (1900–1938), Look Homeward, Angel
- Tom Wolfe (1931–2018), The Bonfire of the Vanities
- Geoffrey Wolff (born 1937), Providence
- Tobias Wolff (born 1945), The Barracks Thief
- Hilma Wolitzer (born 1930), Silver
- Meg Wolitzer (born 1959), This Is Your Life
- Ramsay Wood (born 1943), Kalila and Dimna
- Daniel Woodrell (1953–2025), Give Us a Kiss
- Samuel Woodworth (1784–1842), The Champions of Freedom
- Cornell Woolrich (1903–1968), The Bride Wore Black
- Constance Fenimore Woolson (1840–1894), For the Major
- Herman Wouk (1915–2019), The Caine Mutiny
- Austin Tappan Wright (1883–1931), Islandia
- Ernest Vincent Wright (c. 1873–1939), Gadsby
- Harold Bell Wright (1872–1944), The Shepherd of the Hills
- Kirby Wright (born 1955), Punahou Blues
- Mary Tappan Wright (1851–1917), Aliens
- Richard Wright (1908–1960), Native Son
- Stephen Wright (born 1946), The Amalgamation Polka

== X ==
- Xu Xi (born 1954), The Unwalled City

== Y ==
- Irvin D. Yalom (born 1931), When Nietzsche Wept
- Lois-Ann Yamanaka (born 1961), Wild Meat and the Bully Burgers
- Karen Tei Yamashita (born 1951), Through the Arc of the Rain Forest
- Chelsea Quinn Yarbro (1942–2025), Hotel Transylvania
- Steve Yarbrough (born 1956), The Oxygen Man
- Richard Yates (1926–1992), Revolutionary Road
- Frank Yerby (1916–1991), Judas, My Brother
- Anzia Yezierska (c. 1880–1970), Bread Givers
- Rafael Yglesias (born 1954), Fearless
- Mako Yoshikawa (born 1966), One Hundred and One Ways
- Al Young (1939–2021), Ask Me Now
- Stark Young (1881–1963), So Red the Rose
- Michele Young-Stone

== Z ==
- Rafi Zabor (born 1946), The Bear Comes Home
- Roger Zelazny (1937–1995), Lord of Light
- Paul Zindel (1936–2003), The Pigman
- Nell Zink (born 1964), The Wallcreeper
- Leane Zugsmith (1903–1969), All Victories Are Alike

== See also ==
- "Great American Novel"
- American literature
  - Colonial American literature
  - Southern literature
  - African American literature
  - Jewish American literature
  - LGBT literature
- Lists of writers
  - List of short story authors
  - List of novelists by nationality
  - List of women writers
  - List of African-American writers
  - List of Asian-American writers
  - List of Jewish American authors
  - List of writers from peoples indigenous to the Americas
- Awards
  - Pulitzer Prize for the Novel (1918–1947)
  - Pulitzer Prize for Fiction (1948 to present)
  - National Book Award
- Bestsellers
  - Publishers Weekly lists of bestselling novels in the United States (The top ten each year from 1900 to 2008)
