= Robert Inman =

Robert Inman may refer to:

- Robert Inman (writer), American educator, journalist and author
- Robert Inman (actor), New Zealand-born actor in Australia
- Robert Autry Inman, American country and rockabilly musician
- Bobby Ray Inman, United States Navy admiral
