= Strelecky =

Strelecky or Streletsky is an adjective formed from strelets (a shooter) in several Slavic languages; it may refer to

- John Strelecky (born 1969), American author
- Střelecký Island in Prague, Czech Republic
- Stadion Střelecký ostrov, a football stadium in České Budějovice, Czech Republic

== See also ==
- Strzelecki (disambiguation), a Polish variant
