= Alison Pace =

American novelist

Alison Pace is an American novelist. She lives in New York City.

== Bibliography ==
According to WorldCat, she has published the following books:

- If Andy Warhol had a Girlfriend 2005
- Pug Hill 2006
- Through Thick and Thin 2007
- City Dog 2008
- A Pug's Tale 2011
