= Clara M. Thompson =

19-century American novelist

- Born: 19th century
- Other name: Clara M. Thompson Logan
- Occupation: Novelist
- Years active: 1854–1873
- Notable work: The Chapel of St. Mary (1861)

Clara M. Thompson (b. 1830s?) was an American novelist. She also wrote under the Clara M. Thompson Logan.

Thompson wrote popular Victorian novels that were sentimental and moralistic in style, often peopled by religious characters. The New York Times noted the publication of The Chapel of St. Mary in December 1860, writing that the book was "a readable one".

== Works ==
- The Rectory of Moreland: or, My Duty (1859) (first published as Mary Evans)
- The Chapel of St. Mary (1861)
- Hawthorndean, or, Philip Benton's Family: A Story of Every Day Life (1873)

== See also ==
- List of American novelists
- List of women writers
