= Kerry Nietz =

American writer

- Occupation: Author
- Writing career
- Genre: Science fiction

Kerry Nietz is an American author of science fiction novels. He worked as a programmer at Microsoft, leaving in 1999 to pursue a career in writing. His first work of non-fiction was published in 2003 and concerns his work on the software product FoxPro. His first novel was published in 2009, "A Star Curiously Singing". That story continues in his second book, "The Superlative Stream", published in 2010.

He is best known for "Amish Vampires in Space," which was featured on The Tonight Show Starring Jimmy Fallon.

== Bibliography ==
1. FoxTales: Behind the Scenes at Fox Software (October 2003, September 2010)
2. A Star Curiously Singing (October 2009, January 2016)
3. The Superlative Stream (April 2010, January 2016)
4. Freeheads (October 2011, January 2016)
5. But Who Would Be Dumb Enough to Even Try It? (December 2012—contributor)
6. Mask (February 2013, December 2016)
7. Amish Vampires in Space (October 2013)
8. Amish Zombies from Space (May 2015)
9. Frayed (June 2016)
10. Rhats! (February 2017)
11. Fraught (July 2018)
12. Rhats Too! (December 2018)
13. Amish Werewolves of Space (October 2019)
14. Rhataloo (November 2021)
15. Lost Bits (June 2022)
16. Digital Dreams and Other Distractions (November 2022)
17. My First Novel: And What Became of It (January 2024-contributor)
18. Rhats Free! (April 2024)
19. Fractured: Fragment One (July 2025)
20. Fractured: Fragment Two (December 2025)

=== Short fiction ===
1. Graxin, Mythic Orbits (January 2017)
2. A Symphony of Words and Proteus, Rebirth: Havok Season One (July 2019)
3. Hard's Watcher, Heroes of the Realms (October 2019)
4. Pest Control, Parabolic Orbits (December 2025)
