= Kris Radish =

American novelist

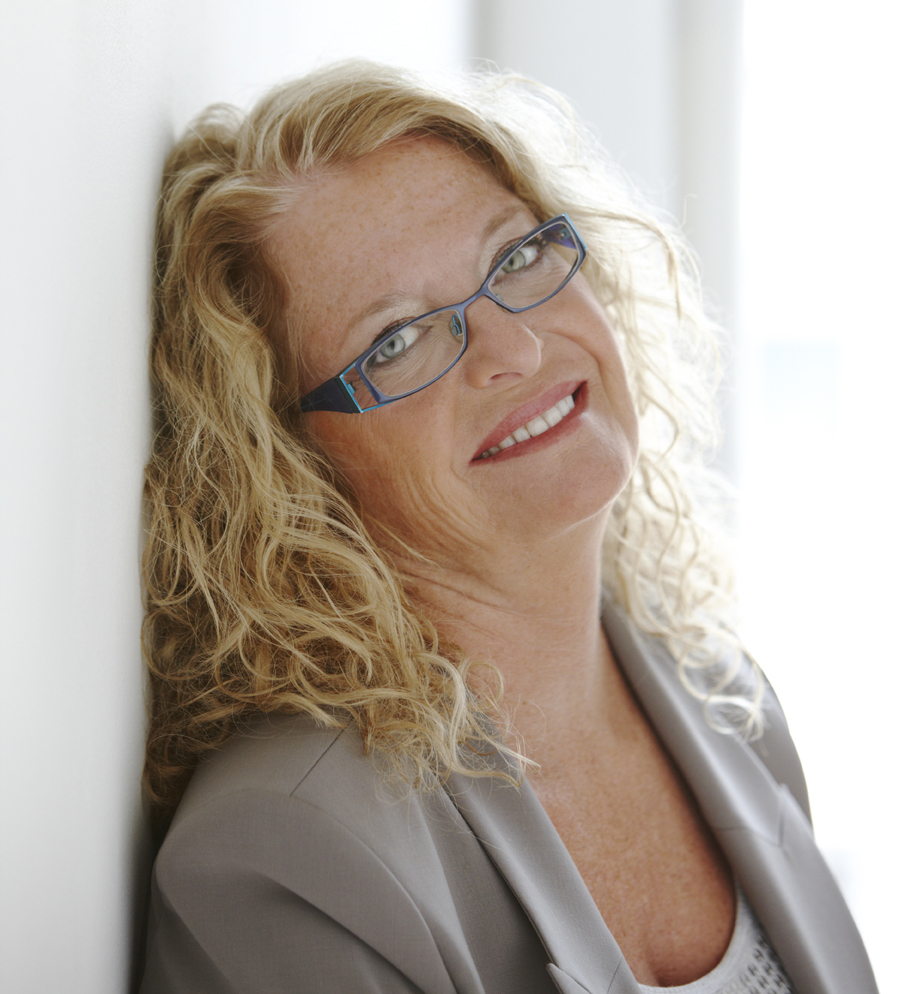
- Born: Kristine Radish; September 18, 1953 (age 72); Milwaukee, Wisconsin, U.S.
- Education: University of Wisconsin–Milwaukee (BA)
- Occupations: Novelist; journalist; columnist
- Spouse: Madonna M. Metcalf (2003-present)
- Children: 2
- Writing career
- Genres: Non-fiction, Historical fiction, Contemporary, True crime, Fiction
- Notable works: Run, Bambi, Run, Annie Freeman's Fabulous Traveling Funeral, "Gravel on the Side of the Road", "Tuesday Night Miracles", "The Sunday List of Dreams", "Hearts on a String", "The Shortest Distance Between Two Women", "Dancing at the Edge of Dawn", "The Year of Necessary Lies", The Elegant Gathering of White Snows"
- Website: www.krisradish.com

Kris Radish (born Kristine Radish September 18, 1953) is an American author, journalist, and nationally syndicated columnist.

== Early life and education ==
Radish was born in Milwaukee, Wisconsin and grew up in Big Bend, Wisconsin. She attended the University of Wisconsin-Waukesha and graduated with a degree in journalism from the University of Wisconsin-Milwaukee.

== Journalism ==
She worked as a Professional Girl Scout-Field Director in Montana and California and for several newspapers in Utah where she was Bureau Chief for the Deseret News. In Wisconsin, she was Managing Editor for the CNI newspaper chain and a freelance magazine writer for a variety of magazines including Midwest Living, Islands, Wisconsin Women and the Milwaukee Journal. A nationally syndicated columnist for DBR Media, Radish wrote a political column and a humor column.

She has taught journalism courses at the University of Wisconsin-Milwaukee and Brigham Young University.

== Writing career ==
Radish has written three works of non-fiction, twelve novels, and has appeared on several national television shows. When speaking about her work, Radish likes to say her genre is called "Broads Who Have Been There" and that she focuses on the real issues women face every day in their lives. She hosts yearly retreats based on her novels for women around the world and was co-owner of the Wine Madonna, a wine and literary lounge in St. Petersburg, Florida for 10 years.

As of 2021, Radish is currently working on her 13th novel, her fourth non-fiction book, and a podcast based on her first book, Run, Bambi, Run.

== Personal life ==
She currently lives in North Carolina.

== Bibliography ==
- Run, Bambi, Run (1992)
- The Elegant Gathering of White Snows (2002)
- Dancing Naked at the Edge of Dawn (2004)
- Annie Freeman's Fabulous Traveling Funeral (2005)
- The Sunday List of Dreams (2007)
- Searching for Paradise in Parker, PA (2008)
- The Shortest Distance Between Two Women (2009)
- Hearts on a String (2010)
- Tuesday Night Miracles (2012)
- A Grand Day to Get Lost (2013)
- Gravel on the Side of the Road - Stories From A Broad Who Has Been There (2014)
- The Year of Necessary Lies (2015)
- A Dangerous Woman From Nowhere (2017)
- A Changing of the Heart - The Tale of the Hummingbird and the Goose (2020 – under K.A Radish)
