= Joseph Torchia =

American journalist, novelist and photographer (1946–1996)

- Born: December 15, 1946; Johnsonburg, Pennsylvania, U.S.
- Died: April 22, 1996 (aged 49); Napa, California, U.S.
- Occupations: Journalist, novelist, photographer
- Writing career
- Genre: Novel
- Notable work: The Kryptonite Kid

Joseph Torchia (December 15, 1946 – April 22, 1996) was an American journalist, novelist and photographer. In the late 1970s, he worked as a reporter for The Palm Beach Post, the San Francisco Chronicle and the San Francisco Examiner.

Torchia was born in Johnsonburg, Pennsylvania, where he graduated in 1964 (Johnsonburg High School). After his studies at the University of Florida (1968) he spent two years in the Peace Corps (1968–1970). After having left journalism, Torchia owned a photography studio during the last fifteen years of his life.

== Works by Torchia ==
- The Kryptonite Kid (1979) The Kryptonite Kid (Kindle edition)
- As If After Sex (1983) As If After Sex (Kindle edition)
- The Edible Variety (posthumously published 2021) The Edible Variety (Kindle edition)
- Purgatory, PA. (posthumously published 2021) Purgatory, PA. (Kindle edition)
- "First Communion" – a short story (Gay Sunshine Journal, no 47, 1982, pp. 90–104)
- "Inside Flannery O'Connor" - an article published in The Flannery O'Connor Bulletin Vol. 25 (1996–97), pp. 81–102 (22 pages) [link to the article on JSTOR]
