= Gary Buslik =

American writer (born 1946)

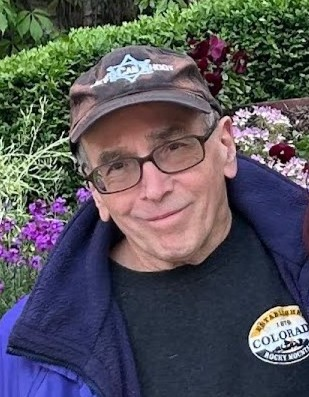
- Buslik in May 2025
- Born: 1946 (age 79–80); Chicago, Illinois, U.S.
- Education: University of Illinois Chicago (PhD)
- Occupation: Author
- Writing career
- Genres: fiction, travel writing
- Subjects: travel writing, literature
- Notable works: A Rotten Person Travels the Caribbean; The Missionary's Position; Akhmed and the Atomic Matzo Balls

Gary Buslik (born 1946 in Chicago) is an American novelist, short story writer, travel writer, and essayist.

== Career ==
His work has appeared in many literary and commercial magazines and anthologies. His travel-essay collection A Rotten Person Travels the Caribbean (Travelers' Tales, 2008) won the 2009 Benjamin Franklin Book Award. He was born in Chicago, Illinois, and earned his Ph.D. in English literature from the University of Illinois Chicago. He had novels published in 1999 and 2012.
