= Joshua Spanogle =

American novelist

Joshua Spanogle is a physician and a novelist. He graduated from Yale University and Stanford Medical School. He has written the bestselling medico-science thrillers Isolation Ward (2006) and Flawless (2007). Spanogle has worked in medical ethics, and his books involve current ethical issues set in the biotechnology industry.
