= Christopher Dow (author) =

American writer

- Born: June 17, 1950 (age 76)

Christopher Dow (born June 17, 1950) is an American writer. He is the author of three volumes of poetry, four novels, a collection of essays and a theoretical book on tai chi. A practitioner of tai chi for more than 30 years, Dow has written articles on these subjects that have appeared in Tai Chi Magazine, Inside Kung Fu and Yoga Journal. He also wrote, directed and produced several video productions, including a documentary series on the first nationally sanctioned kung fu tournament in the United States, the U.S. National Chinese Martial Arts Competition.

Dow was the publisher and a founding editor of Phosphene Magazine, a quarterly literary magazine in the Houston area from 1978 to 1981 that featured fiction, poetry, essays, graphic art and photographs, and Dialog Magazine, a bimonthly urban tabloid in Houston from 1983 to 1984 that featured articles, essays, reviews, features, fiction, poetry, graphic art and photographs.

Dow is currently the editor of Rice Magazine (formerly Sallyport), the magazine of Rice University in Houston. His work has been recognized with awards from the Houston Advertising Federation, the Public Relations Society of America and the Council for Advancement and Support of Education. His awards for writing, editing and video also include a Silver Award for Historical Documentary from the Houston International Film Festival.

== Works ==
Nonfiction

- The Wellspring 2008
- Lord of the Loincloth 2007
- Book of Curiosities

Poetry

- City of Dreams 2010
- The Trip Out 2010
- Texas White Line Fever

Fiction

- Devil of a Time 2009
- Roadkill 2009
- The Dead Detective 2008
- The Werewolf and Tide and Other Compulsions

Editor

- The Best of Phosphene
- The Best of Dialog
