= Kate Watterson =

American novelist

Kate Watterson is an author of suspense and romance novels.

Watterson's Ellie MacIntosh series is about a Wisconsin homicide detective. She has also released short stories as e-books that bridge the gaps between the novels.

Watterson has also written romantic suspense, including her Sexual Studies books.

== Books ==
=== Detective Ellie MacIntosh series ===
1. Frozen, Tor Books, 2012
2. Charred, Tor Books, 2013
3. Buried, Tor Books, 2013
4. Fractured, Forge Books, 2015
5. Crushed, Tor Books, 2018
6. Severed, Tor Books, 2018

==== Ellie MacIntosh e-books ====
1. "Thaw", Tor Books, 2013
2. "Bleed", Tor Books, 2013
3. "Vanished", Tor Books, 2015

=== Detective Danny Haase series ===
1. "Summer Treason", Tor Books, 2014
2. "The Summer Bones", Tor Books, 2015
3. "Blood Is Quicker Than Water", Tor Books, 2015
4. "The Opposite House", Tor Books, 2015

=== Sexual Studies series ===
1. Watcher, Siren Publishing, 2007
2. Blindsided, Siren Publishing, 2009
3. Beautiful Triad, Siren Publishing, 2009

=== Other books ===
- Picture Perfect, Siren-Bookstrand Inc., 2010
- The Best Mistake, Carina Press, 2011
- Reckless Territory, Samhain Publishing, 2012
