= Wendy Higgins =

American novelist

- Born: May 15, 1977 (age 49); Anchorage, Alaska, U.S.
- Education: Potomac Senior High School; Longwood College; George Mason University; Radford University
- Occupation: Novelist
- Writing career
- Genres: Fantasy, Young adult fiction, Romance
- Notable works: Sweet Evil series, Flirting with Maybe: A Novella, See Me
- Website: www.wendyhigginswrites.com

Wendy Higgins (born May 15, 1977) is an American USA Today and NY Times bestselling author of romantic fantasy and paranormal fiction for young adults. Wendy is a voice of hybrid publishing, having been published traditionally and independently.

== Personal life ==
Wendy Higgins (née Wendy Hornback) was born in Anchorage, Alaska. After graduating from Potomac Senior High School in Dumfries, Virginia, she attended Longwood College for three semesters. Higgins then transferred to George Mason University where she graduated with a bachelor's degree in Creative Writing, and went on to study at Radford University, where she earned a master's degree in Education.

Higgins taught 2 years of 9th and 12th grade English before becoming a full-time author. She now lives in Virginia with her children and dog Rue.

== Bibliography ==
=== Standalone works ===
- Flirting with Maybe: A Novella (2013) - HarperCollins
- See Me (2014) - Independent Publishing Platform
- Kiss Collector HarperTeen, 2018

=== The Sweet Series from HarperCollins ===
- Sweet Evil (2012)
- Sweet Peril (2013)
- Sweet Reckoning (2014)
- Sweet Temptation (2015)

=== Eurona Duology from HarperCollins ===
- The Great Hunt (2016)
- The Great Pursuit (2017)

=== Unknown Trilogy, Independently Published ===
- Unknown (2016)
