= Edgar Earl Christopher =

American novelist

- Occupation: Novelist
- Writing career
- Period: Early 20th century
- Genres: Science fiction; thriller
- Notable work: The Invisibles (1903)

Edgar Earl Christopher was an early 20th-century novelist noted for writing The Invisibles, a novel about an American terrorist organization plotting to overthrow czarist Russia.

In The Invisibles, a secret society known as The Invisible Hand operates out of a vast series of caves near Chattanooga, Tennessee. The Invisible Hand, whose members are mostly scientists, have invented explosives of massive power, built a submarine, and created artificial diamonds, which they use to fund their activities.

The Invisibles was published in 1903 and was considered "a curious example of subculture trying to move up." Perhaps conceived before its time, The Invisibles is one of the earliest examples of a modern-style science fiction thriller.

A reviewer's assessment was "Mr. Christopher is a young writer, and his talent seems to be in the direction of plot construction and character study. He is still lacking in dramatic point; he is almost wholly lacking in finish."
