= Michele Young-Stone =

American novelist (born 1971)

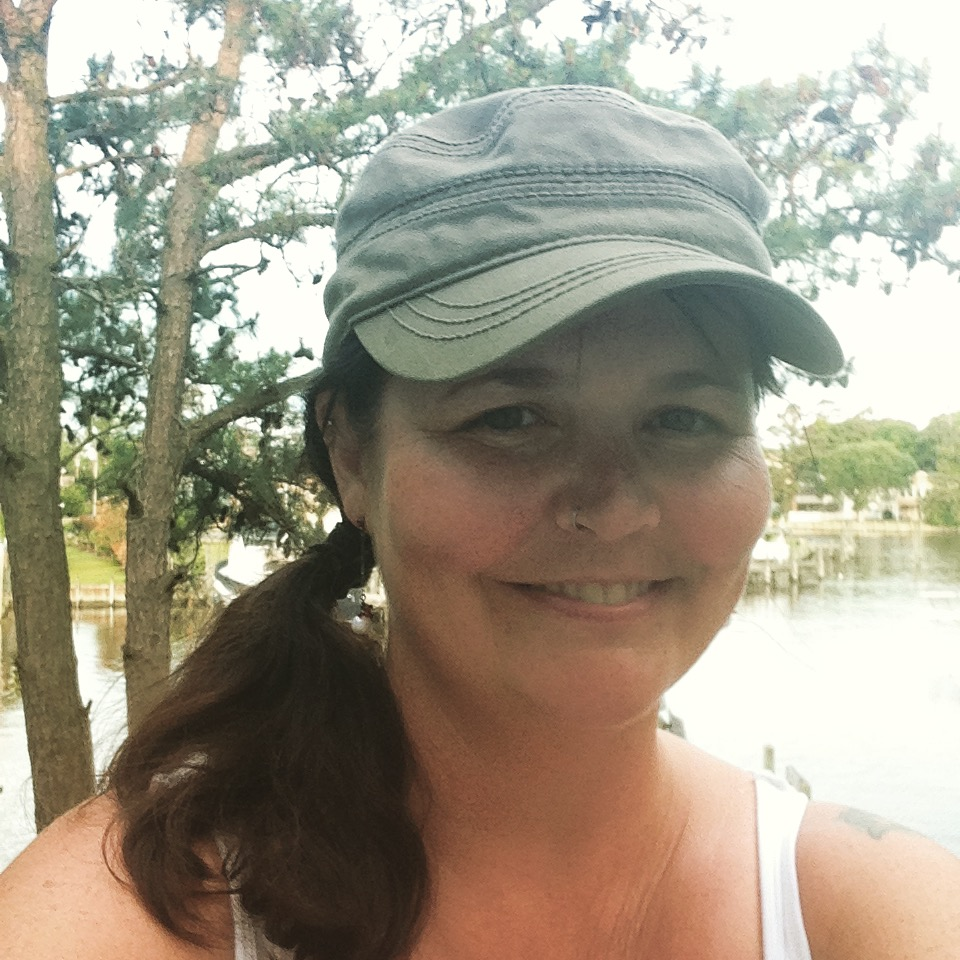
Michele Young-Stone

Michele Young-Stone is an American novelist. She has published three novels: Lost in the Beehive, an O Magazine 2018 Book Pick, Above Us Only Sky (2015), and The Handbook for Lightning Strike Survivors (2010).

Young-Stone was born in Norfolk, Virginia, in 1971 and grew up in Chester, Virginia. When she was seventeen she moved to Richmond, Virginia, where she attended Virginia Commonwealth University, graduating in 1992 with a Bachelor of Arts degree in English. From 1994 to 1995 she returned to VCU, earning a master's degree in Teaching Secondary English. After teaching high-school and middle-school English in Nottoway and Henrico counties, she again returned to Virginia Commonwealth University in 2002 to study fiction writing full-time. Her thesis, completed in 2005, became her first novel. The Handbook for Lightning Strike Survivors was published in 2010 and is about two young people, one of whom has been struck by lightning twice and the other who lost his mother to a lightning strike. Her second novel, Above Us Only Sky, was published in 2015 and centers on a family in which women in two generations are born with wings. Her third novel, Lost in the Beehive, is about a young girl growing up in the 1960s who is sent to an institution to be "cured" of her homosexuality. There, she befriends a wonderful boy, Sheffield Schoeffler, and together, the two make plans to meet in New York City, to live how they want to live. Kitty Drexel, a reviewer for Edge Media Network, wrote, “Themes such as hetero-normativity, male entitlement, and systemic misogyny are at constant play. . . Young-Stone's words cut to the quick. . . . The novel's heroine, Gloria Ricci makes many mistakes, but learns from them and carries on. This is good a reminder for our community: We will struggle to find who we are, but we must keep going.”

Michele has been nominated for a Pushcart Prize. She teaches novel and fiction courses for The Muse Writers Center in Norfolk, VA.

Young-Stone lives in the Outer Banks, North Carolina, with her husband, son, dog, and a bearded dragon named Harry Potter.
