= Jenny Hollowell =

American novelist

- Education: Virginia Commonwealth University (BFA); University of Virginia (MFA)
- Occupations: Novelist; short story writer

Jenny Hollowell is an American novelist and short fiction writer, and a partner and executive producer of music house and record label Ring The Alarm. Her debut novel Everything Lovely, Effortless, Safe was published in 2010, leading her to be named one of the "best new writers" by The Daily Beast.

== Background and career ==
Hollowell received a BFA from Virginia Commonwealth University, where she studied film and photography, and an MFA in creative writing from the University of Virginia, where she was a Henry Hoyns Fellow in Fiction and recipient of the Balch Short Story Award. Her short fiction has appeared in Glimmer Train, Scheherezade, and the anthology New Sudden Fiction, and was named a distinguished story by The Best American Short Stories.

Hollowell was a Tennessee Williams Scholar at the 2007 Sewanee Writers’ Conference, a two-time Fellow at the Ledig House International Writers’ Residency, and a two-time Fellow at the Vermont Studio Center. Her short story "The History of Everything Including You" was performed on NPR's Radiolab, as well as at Symphony Space by actress Kyra Sedgwick. She lives in Los Angeles.
