= Kristy Kiernan =

American novelist

Kristy Kiernan is a novelist known for her books about friendship and family.

== Early life ==
As a child grew up in multiple towns in southwest Florida, and then spent summers in Tennessee. Kiernan's father died when she was a year old, and she was raised by her mother. She was nine years old when her family moved to Chicago for a time. Kiernan attended several gifted programs as a child, from which she drew her ideas for Catching Genius. Kiernan was interested in reading as a young child, but she did not start to write novels until she was thirty-years old.

== Career ==
Kiernan is the author of Catching Genius (Berkley Books), a novel about two sisters whose lives are altered when one is discovered to be profoundly gifted. Her second book, Matters of Faith, was published in 2008 and received the Florida Book Awards Bronze Medal. Her third novel, Between Friends, was published in 2010.

== Selected publications ==
- Kiernan, Kristy (2007). Catching Genius. New York: Penguin Publishing Group. ISBN 978-0-425-21435-0.
- Kiernan, Kristy (2008). Matters of Faith. New York: Penguin. ISBN 978-0-425-22179-2.
- Kiernan, Kristy (2010). Between Friends. New York: Berkley. ISBN 978-0-425-23347-4. OCLC 426801622.
