= Haywood Smith =

American writer

Haywood Smith is an American author. She lives in Georgia.

== Writing career ==
Smith's first book, Shadows in Velvet, won the Romantic Times 1996 Award for First Historical Romance. Her first several books were historical romances, in settings including 17th Century France and England and Medieval Scotland. With Queen Bee of Mimosa Branch, she moved into writing women's fiction about women 50 years old and older, set in the Southern United States.

Smith's books The Red Hat Club and Queen Bee of Mimosa Branch appeared on The New York Times Best Seller List.

== Books ==
- Shadows In Velvet, St. Martin's Press, 1996
- Secrets In Satin, St. Martin's Press, 1997
- Damask Rose, St. Martin's Press, 1998
- Dangerous Gifts, St. Martin's Press, 1999
- Highland Princess, St. Martin's Press, 2000
- Border Lord, St. Martin's Press, 2001
- Queen Bee of Mimosa Branch, St. Martin's Press, 2002
- The Red Hat Club, St. Martin's Press, 2003
- The Red Hat Club Rides Again, St. Martin's Press, 2005
- Wedding Belles, St. Martin's Press, 2008
- The Twelve Sacred Traditions of Magnificent Mothers-In-Law, Belle Books, 2009
- Ladies of the Lake, St. Martin's Press, 2009
- Waking Up in Dixie, St. Martin's Press, 2010
- Wife-in-Law, St. Martin's Press, 2011
- Out of Warranty, St. Martin's Press, 2013
- Queen Bee Goes Home Again, St. Martin's Press, 2014
