= Richard Satterlie =

Scientist

Richard Satterlie is a specialist in invertebrate neurobiology, and Frank Hawkins Kenan Distinguished Professor at the University of North Carolina at Wilmington. He has also written four novels and a poetry collection.

== Books ==
- Phoenix (Novel: Historical, American West) Whiskey Creek Press, 2006. First place winner, Arizona Authors Association annual book awards in the published fiction category.
- Something Bad (Novel: Horror) Medallion Press, 2007. Silver Medal winner, Independent Publishers IPPY book awards (2008).
- Rollicking Anthropomorphisms and Other Observations on the Human Condition (Poetry Collection) Whiskey Creek Press, 2008. Finalist, 2009 EPPIE awards in poetry category (EPICon 2009 annual writing contest)
- Agnes Hahn (Novel: Psychological Suspense) Medallion Press, 2008.
- Imola (Novel: Psychological Suspense) Medallion Press, September 2009)
