= Alexandra Hawkins =

American novelist

- Occupation: Author
- Writing career
- Genre: Historical romance
- Website: www.alexandrahawkins.com

Alexandra Hawkins is an American author of historical romance novels.

Two of her books, After Dark with a Scoundrel and Sunrise with a Notorious Lord, made the USA Today best-selling books list.

== Bibliography ==
Waiting For An Earl Like You, 2017

=== Lords of Vice ===
1. All Night with a Rogue, 2010
2. Till Dawn with the Devil, 2010
3. After Dark with a Scoundrel, 2011
4. Sunrise with a Notorious Lord, 2012
5. All Afternoon with a Scandalous Marquess, 2012
6. Dusk with a Dangerous Duke, 2013
7. Twilight with the Infamous Earl, 2013

=== Masters of Seduction ===
1. A Duke but No Gentleman, 2015
2. You Can't Always Get the Marquess You Want, 2016

=== Anthologies ===
1. Christmas Brides, 2014
