= Carlene Thompson =

American novelist

Carlene Thompson is an American author of suspense thriller novels.

Her first book, Black for Remembrance, was published in 1990 by Little, Brown and was well received. Her books are suspense novels, often with romantic elements and many take place in Thompson's home state of West Virginia. Her books often feature animals, which she bases on animals she knows in real life.

== Books ==
- Black for Remembrance, Little, Brown, 1990
- All Fall Down, Avon Books, 1993
- The Way You Look Tonight, St. Martin's Press, 1997
- Tonight You're Mine, St. Martin's Press, 1998
- In the Event of My Death, St. Martin's Press, 1999
- Don't Close Your Eyes, St. Martin's Press, 2000
- Since You've Been Gone, St. Martin's Press, 2001
- If She Should Die, St. Martin's Press, 2004
- Share No Secrets, St. Martin's Press, 2005
- Last Whisper, St. Martin's Press, 2006
- Last Seen Alive, St. Martin's Press, 2007
- If You Ever Tell, St. Martin's Press, 2008
- You Can Run..., St. Martin's Press, 2009
- Nowhere to Hide, St. Martin's Press, 2010
- To the Grave, St. Martin's Press, 2012
- Can't Find My Way Home, Severn House, 2014
- Just A Breath Away Severn House, 2018
- Praying For Time 2020
