= Kent Harrington =

American novelist

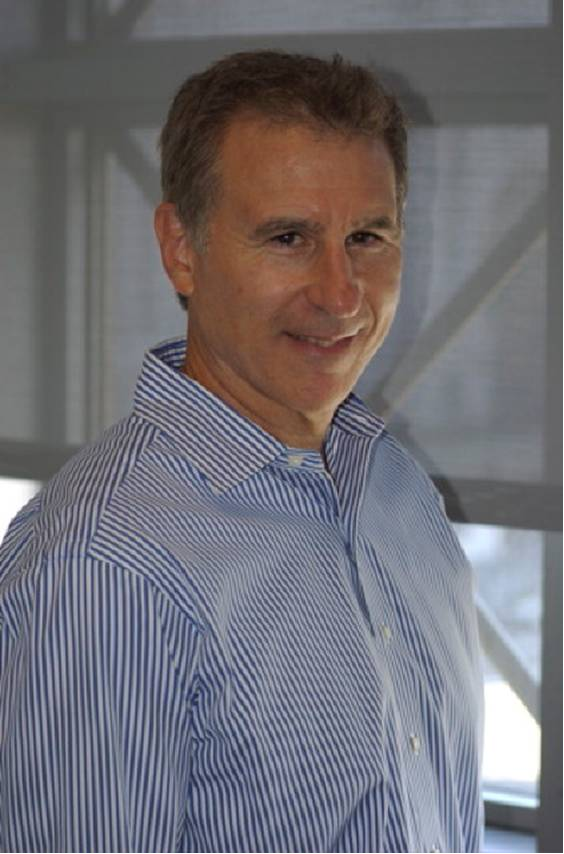
- Kent Harrington
- Born: San Francisco, California, U.S.
- Education: San Francisco State University
- Occupation: Novelist
- Writing career
- Genres: Espionage thriller, Noir fiction, Noir novel, Crime fiction, Thriller
- Website: www.kentharrington.com

Kent Harrington is an American novelist most known for Dia de los Muertos (Day of the Dead), The American Boys, and The Tattooed Muse.

== Background ==
Harrington's father was Irish-Jewish and his mother was Guatemalan. He attended the Palo Alto Military Academy and San Francisco State University, where he received a degree in Spanish literature. He lived in Spain and Latin America. Before becoming a novelist, he was a teacher, carpenter, factory worker and life insurance salesman.

== Bibliography ==
Title	Year Published	Description
Dia de los Muertos (Day of the Dead)	1997	
The Rat Machine	2013	
Dark Ride	1996	
The Tattooed Muse	2001	
The American Boys	1999	
The Good Physician	2008	
Red Jungle	2004	
Last Ferry Home	2018	
Last Seen	2021	
Howlers	2015	
Tabloid Circus	2014	
