= Stefan Mosley =

American novelist (born 1952)

- Born: Stefan S. Mosley; January 19, 1952 (age 74); Tehran, Iran
- Occupations: Author; novelist; photographer; entrepreneur

Stefan S. Mosley (born January 19, 1952) is an American author, novelist, photographer and entrepreneur

== Early life ==
Mosley was born on January 19, 1952, in Tehran, Iran, where he spent most of his childhood and elementary education. In later years, he traveled to and lived in a number of other countries. From early years on, he demonstrated a talent for foreign cultures and writing and his essays and short stories were quite popular among his peers and his teachers.

== Career ==
From mid 1990s, Mosley wrote a number of articles for various (local) publications in the United States. His first self-published novel, "The Larsky Gang" has received rave reviews by readers from around the world.

Mosley is an independent Management Consultant by trade and lives in the Greater Washington, DC area.

== Personal life ==
Photography was another passion Mosley discovered in his early youth and today, his photos are displayed on a number of photo sites.
