= Jessie Prichard Hunter =

American novelist

Jessie Prichard Hunter is an American novelist. She is the author of three psychological thrillers, Blood Music, One Two Buckle My Shoe., and The Green Muse: An Edouard Mas Novel.

She currently resides in New York's Hudson Valley with her husband and two children.
