= Allison Pang =

American fantasy writer

Allison Pang is the writer of the Abby Sinclair urban fantasy series published by Pocket Books and the ongoing Fox & Willow webcomic at Sad Sausage Dogs. Pang previously worked as a marine biologist.

== Bibliography ==
=== Abby Sinclair UF series ===
1. A Brush of Darkness
2. A Sliver of Shadow
3. A Trace of Moonlight
4. Carniepunk: A Duet with Darkness (Prequel short story)

=== The IronHeart Chronicles ===
1. Magpie’s Song

=== Fox & Willow ===
1. Came a Harper
2. To the Sea
3. Blinded by the Light
4. The Better to See You With
