= Mark Gilroy =

American novelist

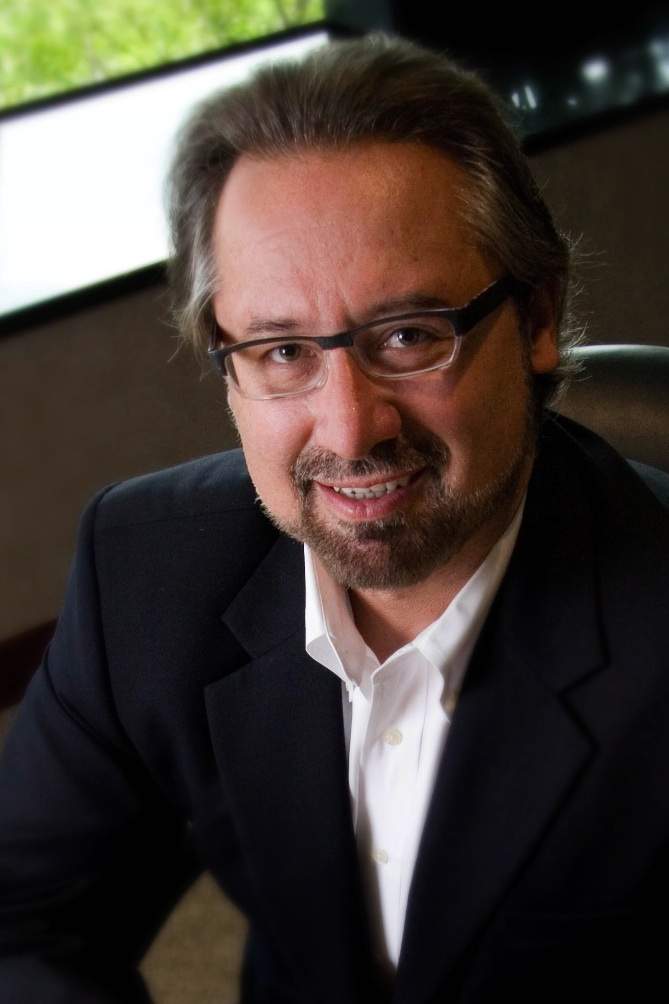
- Born: August 14, 1958 (age 68); Dayton, Ohio, U.S.
- Occupations: Writer, publisher
- Writing career
- Genres: Psychological thrillers, crime fiction
- Website: www.mkgilroy.com

Mark Gilroy (born August 14, 1958) is an American publisher and author notable for writing character-driven crime thrillers. USA Today reviewer Serena Chase described his crime thriller Cuts Like A Knife as an "intense, eerie, funny and suspenseful thriller with a very subtle faith thread that enriches rather than suffocates the story." Publishers Weekly described the thriller as having an "evil criminal, dedicated cop, and exciting ending." A reviewer of his second novel, Every Breath You Take, suggested that "shifts between private and public reactions nicely fit the spiritual themes in the material." Gilroy has worked thirty years in the publishing industry.

== Books ==
- Every Breath You Take, Worthy Publishing, 365 Pages, 978–1617950681.
- Cuts Like A Knife Worthy Publishing, 416 pages, April 3, 2012, ISBN 1936034697, ISBN 9781936034697
- Cold As Ice (not yet released)
