= Kimberly Warner-Cohen =

American novelist

Kimberly Warner-Cohen (born 1978) is an American novelist. She was born in Chicago and raised in Brooklyn, New York. Her first novel, Sex, Blood and Rock'n'Roll was put out by Ig Publishing in May 2006, and was a finalist in 2006/7 for Nerve.com's annual Henry Miller Award. The novel, about a female serial killer who derives sexual satisfaction out of the murders, is a harsh commentary on gender equality. Her short story, "People Are Strange", was included in Akashic Books' Portland Noir.
