= Nellie Hermann =

American writer

- Born: Boston, Massachusetts, U.S.
- Education: Brown University; Columbia University (MFA)
- Occupation: Author
- Website: www.nelliehermann.com

Nellie Hermann is an American writer who lives in New York, and the author of two novels. Her debut novel was The Cure for Grief (Simon & Schuster, 2008); her second novel, The Season of Migration, deals with Vincent van Gogh's time in Belgium, and uses the artist's correspondence along with fabricated letters.

== Early life ==
Born in Boston and raised in Newton, Massachusetts, Hermann attended Brown University before getting her MFA at Columbia University.
