= R. Clifton Spargo =

American novelist

R. Clifton Spargo (born 1965 in Chicago) is an American novelist, short story writer, and cultural critic. He is the author most notably of the novel Beautiful Fools, The Last Affair of Zelda and Scott Fitzgerald (2013).

== Life ==
Spargo is a graduate of the Iowa Writers’ Workshop, Yale Divinity School. Edinburgh University, and the doctoral program in literature at Yale University.

A past winner of Glimmer Train’s Award for New Writers as well as its Fiction Open Contest, he has been a Whiting Fellow in the Humanities, the Pearl Resnick Fellow at the United States Holocaust Memorial Museum, A Jackson Fellow at the Beinecke Library, and an Arts Fellow at the Iowa Writers’ Workshop.

His stories, have appeared in The Antioch Review, The Kenyon Review, Glimmer Train, FICTION, and elsewhere. And his essays and reviews have appeared in venues such as The Yale Review, Raritan, The Cambridge Companion to Bob Dylan, The Oxford Handbook to Elegy, The Wall Street Journal, NewCity, Bookslut, the Chicago Tribune, The Atlantic, and The Huffington Post, for which he writes a blog called “The HI/LO” on the interplay between high and low culture, most specifically, about rock ‘n’ roll.

He has taught creative writing, literature, and ethics at Yale University, Marquette University, and the University of Iowa, and he was chosen as the Provost’s Visiting Writer in Fiction at the University of Iowa, 2013-14. He co-created and leads a testimonial writing program for The Voices and Faces Project. He recently served as the inaugural Dixon Professor of Creative Writing at Wittenberg University, 2014–15.

== Works ==
=== Fiction ===
- Beautiful Fools, The Last Affair of Zelda and Scott Fitzgerald (The Overlook Press, 2013).

=== Nonfiction ===
- Vigilant Memory: Emmanuel Levinas, the Holocaust, and the Unjust Death (philosophy) (The Johns Hopkins University Press, 2006).
- The Ethics of Mourning (literary criticism) (The Johns Hopkins University Press, 2004).
