= Charles A. Smythwick =

American novelist

- Writing career
- Notable works: False measure: A satirical novel of the lives and objectives of upper middle-class Negroes

Charles A. Smythwick is a one-time published author of a satirical novel about race in America. He was then later convicted of tax fraud.

== Early life ==
Charles Smythwick worked briefly as a social worker in New York City.

== Literary works ==
Smythwick published one novel during his lifetime, False measure;: A satirical novel of the lives and objectives of upper middle-class Negroes (1954).

It originally sold for $3.50, and was praised by Jet Magazine for standing out amongst other race-related novels in America for breaking from the interracial romance and poverty centered conflicts. His novel dealt with the superficial values of the middle class black community who “feud for supremacy in the tinseled world like cats and dogs”.

== Criminal life ==
After his first publication, Smythwick was charged and pleaded guilty to conspiracy in a 1951 income tax fraud. Working in an organized group from within his job at Manhattan’s New York Internal Revenue Collector’s office, “fraudulent returns were mailed to non-existent parties, then cashed”, using false tax rebate checks. The alleged leader and former chief clerk Ruth McAdoo Serge, committed suicide before trial. The heist was estimated to be worth about $100,000. Smythwick was indicted in 1951, and sentenced to three years in prison in 1954.

== Publications ==
Smythwick was featured in Jet Magazine a total of three times. The September 2, 1954 issue reviewed his novel, False measure;: A satirical novel of the lives and objectives of upper middle-class Negroes, in the magazine’s “Book of the Week” category.

Later that same year, in the September 9, 1954 issue, the magazine wrote of his criminal sentencing. To add insult to injury, this was placed under the “Books” section rather than “Crime”, and on the very next page after the Book of the Week topic, where he was previously featured.

Smythwick was also briefly mentioned in Andrew Tully’s book, Treasury Agent, in 1958, mentioning his involvement in the tax fraud.
