= Carolyn Marsden =

American author (born 1950)

- Born: August 14, 1950 (age 76)
- Education: University of Colorado; Vermont College of Fine Arts
- Occupation: Author

Carolyn Marsden (born August 14, 1950) is an American author. Educated at the University of Colorado and Vermont College of Fine Arts, Marsden worked as a bilingual elementary teacher before she became a published author. Marsden has written 14 books for young adults including The Gold-Threaded Dress (2002), Mama Had to Work on Christmas (2003), Silk Umbrellas (2004), Moon Runner (2005), The Quail Club (2006), The Jade Dragon (2006), Bird Springs (2007), When Heaven Fell (2007), The Buddha's Diamonds (2008), Sahwira: An African Friendship (2009), Take Me With You (2010), Starfields (2011), The White Zone (2012) and My Own Revolution (2012).
