= Joyce MacIver =

American novelist and playwright

Georgette Scott aka Georgette Carneal (1904 in Baltimore – 1999 in New York City), known by her pen name Joyce MacIver, was an American novelist and playwright.

Her most famous novel is The Frog Pond (1961), based on episodes of her own life. Other works include the novels The Exquisite Thing (1968), Mercy (1977) and The Glimpse (1984), and the play American Royalty with Richard Haase. As Georgette Carneal, she wrote the novel The Great Day and the biography A Conqueror of Space An Authorized Biography of the Life and Work of Lee DeForest.

== Sources ==
- New York Times obituary.
- Special collection at the Milton S. Eisenhower Library, The Johns Hopkins University, Baltimore.
