= Wayne Caldwell =

American novelist and poet

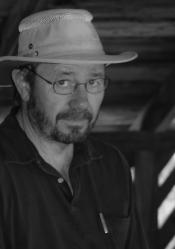
- Born: June 1, 1948 (age 78); Asheville, North Carolina, U.S.
- Education: University of North Carolina; Appalachian State University; Duke University (PhD)
- Occupation: Novelist
- Writing career
- Genres: Fiction, Historical Fiction
- Notable work: Cataloochee: A Novel
- Website: waynecaldwell.com

Wayne Caldwell (born June 1, 1948) is an American novelist and poet.

== Biography ==
Wayne Caldwell was born and raised in Asheville, North Carolina, which is the setting for much of his fictional work.

Caldwell attended the University of North Carolina as an undergraduate, Appalachian State University for his Master's program, and in 1973 he earned a Ph.D. in English Literature at Duke University.

After teaching English at North Carolina Central University in Durham, North Carolina and Union College in Schenectady, New York, Caldwell returned to Asheville.

He began writing works of fiction in the late 1990s.

== Bibliography ==
=== Novels ===
- Cataloochee (2007), Random House
- Requiem by Fire (2010), Random House
- Shadow Family (2025), Madville Publishing

=== Poetry ===
- Woodsmoke (2021), Blair
- River Road (2024), Blair

Other Works

- The Pact, Carolina Alumni Review, (July/August 1999).
- It Was Crows, Our State, (November 2000).
- Typology at Lowe’s: Judges 16:1-3, Theology Today, (January 2001).
- The Burning Tree, Now & Then, (Summer 2001).
- Hangover, The Village Rambler, (May/June 2004).
- Wolfe and Krazy Kat, The Thomas Wolfe Review, Vol. 32 (2008).
