= Noel Everingham Sainsbury =

American writer

Noel Sainsbury, Jr.
- Born: June 11, 1884; New York City, New York
- Died: July 1, 1955 (aged 71); Lake Worth Beach, Florida
- Occupation: Writer (novelist)
- Spouse(s): Elizabeth Slade (div.); Dorothy Wayne Illick (m. 1926)
- Children: 2
- Writing career
- Pen name: Charles Lawton
- Period: 20th century
- Genre: Juvenile fiction

Noel Everingham Sainsbury Jr. (June 11, 1884 – 1955) was an author of various children's adventure and mystery novels during the late 1920s and the 1930s.

He served as a naval aviator during World War I and retained active connections with the naval reserve. He served in the Navy during World War II and retired with the rank of lieutenant commander.

Educated as an engineer, Sainsbury began writing juvenile fiction in the late 1920s, producing the Great Ace and Bill Bolton, Naval Aviator series under his own name and contributing to the Dorothy Dixon and Malay Jungle series under various pseudonyms, including under the maiden name of his second wife. He also wrote some sports-themed juvenile books, including Gridiron Grit and The Fighting Five, as a part of his Champion Sport Stories series.

Sainsbury married twice, first Elizabeth (Bessie) Slade from whom he divorced, and then in 1926 Dorothy Wayne Illick. He had a child by each wife.

== Works ==
- Billy Smith, Exploring Ace, (1928)
- Billy Smith, Secret Service Ace, (1932)
- Billy Smith, Mystery Ace, (1932)
- Billy Smith, Trail Eater Ace, (1933)
- Billy Bolton and the Flying Fish, (1933)
- Billy Smith, Shanghaied Ace, (1934)
- The Fighting Five, (1934)
- Cracker Stanton, (1934)
- Gridiron Grit, (1934)

=== As Charles Lawton ===
- Jungle Menace, (1937)
- Ros Hackney, Halfback, (1937)
- Home Run Hennessey, (1940)
- Winning Forward Pass, (1940)
- Touchdown To Victory, (1942)
