= John Strelecky =

American author, philosopher, and speaker (born 1969)

- Born: September 13, 1969 (age 56); Chicago, Illinois, U.S.
- Occupation: Author
- Writing career
- Language: English

John Strelecky (born September 13, 1969) is an American author of motivational books and the creator of the Big Five for Life concept.

As of 2022, Strelecky's books have sold more than nine million copies worldwide and have been translated into 43 languages.

== Writing ==
In 2002, Strelecky wrote his first book, The Café on the Edge of the World. The book was initially self-published, but after it had sold more than ten thousand copies across twenty-four countries in less than a year, he was signed by a literary agent.

The book was a best-seller in Singapore, then Taiwan. In 2009, it was released in French Canada under the title Le Why Café. In Germany, translated as Das Café am Rande der Welt, it has been a Der Spiegel best-seller in its category since 2015.

== Books ==
Strelecky has authored the following books:

- The Café on The Edge of The World
- Return to The Café on The Edge of The World
- The Big Five for Life
- The Big Five for Life Continued
- Life Safari
- AHAS! - Moments of Inspired Thought
- How to be Rich and Happy
