= Robert Inman (writer) =

American journalist (1931–2006)

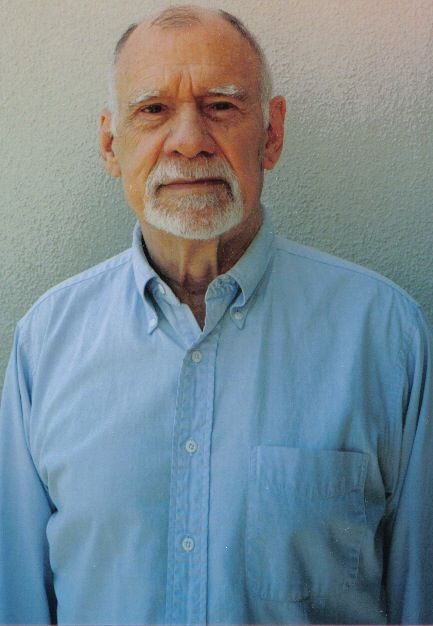
Robert A. Inman

Robert Anthony Inman (June 13, 1931 – November 20, 2006) was an American educator, journalist and author.

Inman was the son of Verne Inman, M.D., former chairman of the Department of Orthopedic Surgery at UCSF. He was born in San Francisco and attended Grattan School and Lowell High, achieving the highest honors. As he grew up, he worked summers as manager of the Headen Park Farm, a Santa Clara, California farm founded by his great-great-grandfather, Benjamin F. Headen in 1852. The farm house is now the Inman-Headen Museum.

Inman graduated from Stanford with distinction (Phi Beta Kappa)in 1952, and was awarded back-to-back Fulbright Scholarships in German Literature in Graz, Austria. During this time he met Joan Marshall (Stanford, '53) at a New Year's gathering of Stanford friends in Vienna. They were married in Denver in 1958. After 21 years of marriage the couple was amicably divorced but remained good friends.

Focused on writing all his life, Inman first authored a play which was performed by the Kaleidoskoptheater ensemble in Vienna.

In the U.S. Army, he served as a linguist in Intelligence Headquarters (Northern Europe) in Frankfurt, Germany. After his discharge, he completed a year of graduate studies at the Free University of Berlin. He later taught in the Germanic Languages Department at the University of Washington in Seattle, and received his master's degree there. He also worked as an editor in the U.W. President's Office.

In 1960, Inman and his family moved to Colorado, where he began his first novel and worked as an editor, reporter and librarian for the Denver Post. He later lived in San Francisco and New York City, where he was the editor of all six scientific journals for the American Institute of Aeronautics and Astronautics, from 1983 to 1987.

His publications included two novels, The Torturer's Horse (1965) and The Blood Endures(1981). He received the O. Henry Award for a short story, "I'll Call You" (1981). Inman published other numerous short stories and articles, and was awaiting publication of a new novel, Delphi, when he died suddenly at the age of 75.

Inman was recognized in both Who's Who in America and in the World. He was recognized by Men of Achievement in 1992.
