= DeLauné Michel =

American author and actress

- Born: Baton Rouge, Louisiana, U.S.
- Education: St. Joseph's Academy
- Occupations: Author; actress
- Spouse: Dan Fried
- Children: 2

DeLauné Michel is an American author and actress.

== Biography ==
Michel was raised in southern Louisiana in a literary family which includes her uncle, Andre Dubus; her mother, Elizabeth Nell Dubus; and her cousins, mystery writer James Lee Burke, Andre Dubus III (House of Sand and Fog), and Alafair Burke.

The Baton Rouge, Louisiana-born Michel was named for Helene DeLauné, according to family history the first woman over from France on her mother's side of the family. Helene DeLauné was in the court of Marie Antoinette and her husband, Jules André Dubus, fought in the French Revolution. Antoinette gave Helene jewels to help her and her husband escape to Louisiana. Michel's father's family was the eleventh family in New Orleans.

At 14, Michel began working professionally as a model. Until leaving Baton Rouge, she did weekly fashion shows, print and TV ads, taught modeling classes to women and self-esteem classes to teens in a foster home, and edited a local paper’s fashion issue. When she was 17, during her junior year of high school while living alone with her mother following her parents’ explosive divorce, her mother decided to end Michel's education at St. Joseph's Academy, the all-girl, Catholic high school that she was attending, and arranged for Michel to get a GED, and move into an apartment with an older sister. To support herself, Michel became the manager and buyer of a boutique in what would have been her senior year, and was the first to bring Williwear, Max Studio, and Norma Kamali clothing lines to Baton Rouge.

After moving to New York City at 19, Michel was a host at The Four Seasons Restaurant before signing with Click Models and booking Commes des Garcon’s inaugural US show with Jean Michel Basquiat. Upon returning to Manhattan from a stint modeling in Milan, she studied acting with Michael Howard and Tony Greco while working as an assistant manager at Le Bernardin, a waitress at the original Jams, and a manager at Florent Morellet’s Ninth Avenue restaurant, Bellevue.

After moving to Los Angeles, Michel had guest starring roles on TV shows such as NYPD Blue, The Gilmore Girls, and Judging Amy, among others. She did a number of independent films, including Harry Shearer's directorial debut, and Equity-waiver theatre, including her own one-woman show.

In 1996, Michel created "Spoken Interludes", a critically acclaimed reading series where award-winning, bestselling, and up-coming writers read their own work to sold out crowds of over 300. This literary institution has been covered extensively by publications ranging from the Los Angeles Times, The New York Times, GQ Magazine, LA Magazine, LA Weekly, and has been heard on NPR. While writing and performing her work regularly at Spoken Interludes, Michel also performed her pieces on NPR station KCRW. In 2000, Michel developed an out-reach writing program for highly at-risk youth. She recruited other writers to teach with her, and over the next two decades they reached children in inner-city schools and juvenile institutions in LA and NY reaching over 250 students a year. She also created a book drive for a pediatric clinic in Yonkers, NY that put over 3000 free books into the hands of underprivileged children.

== Works ==
The first two short stories that Michel wrote won recognition in the Thomas Wolfe Prize Short Fiction Competition sponsored by Duke University. Later work won the Pacificus Foundation Literary Award. She performed her stories on NPR station KCRW. One of her short stories caught the eye of an agent, who then sent it to Joyce Carol Oates, who referred to Michel's writing as "a wonderful, idiosyncratic voice and an extremely promising talent." But Oates felt that the story was actually a chapter of a novel. Michel agreed and her first novel, Aftermath of Dreaming, was born.

In Aftermath of Dreaming (William Morrow/HarperCollins, April 2006), Michel explores the universal themes of abandonment, forgiveness, and letting go. The novel is loosely based on an intimate six-year relationship she shared with Warren Beatty. Her second novel The Safety of Secrets was published by Avon A/HarperCollins in May 2008.

In July 2020, Michel and her husband, Dan Fried, launched Book YaYa, an online event space for writers to connect with readers that Fried designed and ran while Michel produced and hosted the free events. That fall, they partnered with the Westchester Library System in creating a series that served all 44 libraries with live recorded events. In 2022, after over 25 years of programming that showcased almost 1000 writers to audiences on both coasts, and over 20 years of outreach writing program that served over 5000 children, Spoken Interludes was shuttered, along with Book YaYa. Michel teaches a private writing workshop, and has recently completed her memoir, The Mattress Ball. (“The Mattress Ball delivers the kind of constant pleasure that comes from reading well-articulated pain interspersed with humor. It’s a book that will take its place in Southern tales of deception with the mass appeal of The Glass Castle.” Adam Gopnik) She lives in Westchester County, New York with her husband and two sons.
