= Pegasus Descending =

2006 novel by James Lee Burke

- Author: James Lee Burke
- Language: English
- Series: Dave Robicheaux
- Genre: Detective novel
- Publisher: Simon & Schuster
- Publication date: 2006
- Publication place: United States
- Media type: Print (hardback & paperback)
- Pages: 368 pp
- ISBN: 1501198580
- Followed by: The Tin Roof Blowdown

Pegasus Descending is a crime novel by James Lee Burke.

== Plot summary ==
Dave Robicheaux, once an officer for the New Orleans Police Department and before that a U.S. Army infantry lieutenant who fought in the Vietnam War, works as sheriff's deputy in New Iberia, Louisiana. When Trish Klein, a beautiful young woman, arrives to Louisiana, passing hundred-dollar bills in local casinos, Robicheaux knows there's going to be trouble. Twenty-five years earlier, while drunk in Florida, Robicheaux witnessed her father, fellow Vietnam veteran Dallas Klein, executed by a group of cold-blooded robbers. Trish tries to bait Whitey Bruxal, the aging mobster responsible for Dallas's death. Meanwhile, Robicheaux investigates the apparent suicide of young co-ed Yvonne Darbonne. The two cases are linked. He and his longtime partner, former Marine and Vietnam vet, Clete Purcel try to prove it.

== Release details ==
- 2006, USA, Simon & Schuster, New York, ISBN 1501198580
