= A Private Cathedral =

2020 novel by James Lee Burke

A Private Cathedral: A Dave Robicheaux Novel
- Author: James Lee Burke
- Audio read by: Will Patton
- Language: English
- Series: Dave Robicheaux
- Genre: Crime fiction, Mystery, Supernatural
- Publisher: Simon & Schuster
- Publication date: August 11, 2020
- Publication place: United States
- Media type: Print (hardcover and paperback), e-book, audiobook
- Pages: 384
- ISBN: 9781982151683
- Preceded by: The New Iberia Blues

A Private Cathedral is a novel by American author James Lee Burke, published in 2020. It is part of the Dave Robicheaux series which blends elements of crime with elements of the supernatural. Set in Louisiana, the novel delves into a centuries-old feud between two families and presents a blend of mystery and mysticism.

== Plot ==
In this gripping narrative, Robicheaux finds himself entangled in a bitter, long-standing feud between two Louisiana families: the Shondells and the Balangies. The conflict takes a dark and mysterious turn with the appearance of a sinister figure named Gideon Richetti, who seems to have the ability to bend time and space. Richetti's otherworldly abilities and malevolent intentions introduce a supernatural element to the story, adding layers of complexity to the already intricate family saga. As Detective Robicheaux investigates the escalating violence and tries to protect those caught in the crossfire, he grapples with his own inner demons and moral dilemmas. The novel weaves together themes of love, betrayal, and redemption while exploring the depths of human corruption and the possibility of supernatural intervention in the affairs of the mortally corrupt. A Private Cathedral is not just a tale of crime and punishment; it's a lyrical, sometimes haunting exploration of good, evil, and the ambiguous spaces in between, all narrated in Burke's rich, descriptive prose that vividly brings to life the sultry, mystical landscape of Louisiana.

== Publication ==
James Lee Burke's A Private Cathedral was released on August 11, 2020, by Simon & Schuster.

== Reception ==
A Private Cathedral received mixed to positive reviews from critics. "Kirkus Reviews" noted the novel's intricate plot and character development, emphasizing its place within the larger Dave Robicheaux series. "Spectrum Culture" praised the novel for its unexpected supernatural elements, describing it as a departure from Burke's usual crime fiction but still rooted in his signature lyrical prose. "The Washington Independent Review of Books" highlighted the novel's blend of the supernatural with the gritty reality of crime, praising Burke's ability to weave these elements together seamlessly. On the other hand, some critics pointed out the novel's complex narrative structure and its departure from the conventional crime genre.
