= The Neon Rain =

1987 novel by James Lee Burke

- Author: James Lee Burke
- Language: English
- Series: Dave Robicheaux
- Genre: Detective novel
- Publisher: Simon & Schuster
- Publication date: 1987
- Publication place: United States
- Media type: Print (hardback & paperback)
- Pages: 320 pp
- ISBN: 0753820331
- Followed by: Heaven's Prisoners

The Neon Rain is a crime novel by James Lee Burke, the first in a series featuring the fictional detective Dave Robicheaux.

== Plot summary ==
While fishing on a back country bayou, New Orleans Police Department officer Dave Robicheaux finds a body. Robicheaux, once a U.S. Army infantry lieutenant who fought in the Vietnam War, becomes involved with drug dealers, mafia chieftains, and a former army general with shady arms dealings in Central America.

The story starts with a vivid description of Dave visiting a convict who is about to be executed at Angola penitentiary. There are crowds outside the jail, some asking for clemency, some baying for the convict's blood. Dave speaks to the convict who explains that he is trying to make amends for some of the things he has done and tells Dave that a criminal is planning on murdering him. It is clear that Dave is not too concerned.

A lifelong friend of Dave's, Cletus Purcell, appears early on in the story, who from the beginning presents as a greatly troubled man with alcohol, drugs, gambling and relationship issues. After learning of the convict conversation, he too suggests there is little credibility to the warning.

Dave soon has other things to occupy his mind and is drawn into a murder investigation. A young girl named Lovelace Deshotels is found dead in the sea. The local police are happy it is misadventure but Dave believes she has been murdered. This is where his problems begin.

Two corrupt cops pull Dave over on his way home and are clearly intent on causing him serious harm but Dave reacts quickly and draws his gun and handcuffs them to his own car.

From this point, the story develops into a thriller as unseen forces seek to destroy Dave. Fortunately, he meets a wonderful young woman named Annie Ballard whom he falls in love with.

== Release details ==
- 1987, USA, Simon & Schuster, New York, ISBN 0753820331
