= Elizabeth Nell Dubus =

American author and playwright (1933–2020)

- Died: August 30, 2020

Elizabeth Nell Dubus was an American novelist, teacher, community activist, and playwright.

== Early life ==
Elizabeth Nell Dubus Michel Baldridge was born in Lake Charles, Louisiana October 26, 1933. She attended the University of Southwestern Louisiana.

== Career ==
Dubus began to write professionally when she was forty years old. Her first published book was Cajun, which she had to start twice when a copier service lost most of her first draft. The first printing of Cajun sold out. Dubus ultimately published a trilogy of books based on the Cajun and French culture of Louisiana (Cajun, Where Love Rules, and To Love and to Dream). Her autobiography was published posthumously in 2023.

She authored novels and plays under the pen name Elizabeth Nell Dubus, which is her maiden name. Her first play, Mixed Doubles, was set in Lafayette, Louisiana and staged by the Baton Rouge Little Theater in 1984. Her play Welcome Party was heralded by Playbill in 1999.

Dubus wrote a weekly column "Conversations Over Coffee" in the "Baton Rouge Enterprise", and for Gris Gris. She gathered these conversations into a non-fiction book on parenting, When A Parent Imposes Limits: Discipline, Authority, And Freedom In Today's Family, which she published under the name Beth Michel.

Dubus taught for the English departments of Louisiana State University, the University of Lafayette, and Southern University. She co-created and directed a drama program at Angola State Prison.

== Selected publications ==
- Cajun, (1983, Putnam Adult)
- Where Love Rules (1985, Putnam Publishing Group)
- To Love and to Dream (1986, Putnam Publishing Group)
- Twilight of the Dawn (1988, HarperCollins Publishers Ltd.)
- Dubus, Elizabeth Nell (2023). Memories of a Louisiana girlhood: with recipes. Lafayette, LA: University of Louisiana at Lafayette Press. ISBN 978-1-946160-99-7.
- Michel, Elizabeth Dubus (1975). "Portraits". The North American Review. 260 (3). University of Northern Iowa: 48–51. JSTOR 25099282.

== Personal life ==
Born into a literary family, she is the sister of writer Andre Dubus and Kathryn Dubus.Her daughter is the author DeLauné Michel, and her nephew is Andre Dubus III. Two of her cousins are writers, the mystery writer James Lee Burke and the novelist Alafair Burke.
