= The New Iberia Blues =

2019 novel by James Lee Burke

- Author: James Lee Burke
- Language: English
- Series: Dave Robicheaux
- Genre: Crime fiction, Mystery fiction
- Publisher: Simon & Schuster
- Publication date: January 8, 2019
- Publication place: United States
- Media type: Print (hardcover and paperback), e-book, audiobook
- Pages: 464
- ISBN: 978-1501176876
- Preceded by: Robicheaux
- Followed by: A Private Cathedral

The New Iberia Blues is a crime and mystery novel by American author James Lee Burke. It is the twenty-second installment in the Dave Robicheaux series and is set in Louisiana. It was named one of the best crime novels of 2019 by The New York Times Book Review.

== Plot ==
In The New Iberia Blues, Detective Dave Robicheaux finds himself embroiled in a complex web of crimes and moral dilemmas. The story begins with the discovery of a young woman who has been crucified and left adrift at sea, a gruesome symbol that sets the tone for the entire narrative. As Robicheaux investigates, he uncovers links to various influential groups, including Hollywood elites, the mob, and certain local police officers, suggesting a vast and intricate network of corruption and vice.

The narrative takes Robicheaux back into his own past, reconnecting him with Desmond Cormier, a figure he knew from Cormier's ambitious early days in New Orleans. As the story unfolds, the detective, aided by his friends Clete Purcel and his daughter Alafair, navigates a dangerous path that not only exposes external threats but also forces him to confront his inner demons and the very nature of evil itself. The plot is not just about solving the crimes but also delves into philosophical reflections on human nature, the pervasive presence of evil, and the potential for redemption. The novel portrays the struggle between light and darkness, both in the external world of crime and corruption and within the souls of the characters themselves. Through Robicheaux's journey and his interactions with a rich cast of characters, the story explores questions about morality, the human condition, and the possibility of finding grace and redemption amidst the darkness.

== Publication ==
The New Iberia Blues was published on January 8, 2019, by Simon & Schuster, and available in hardcover, paperback, e-book, and audiobook formats.

== Reception ==
Reviews of The New Iberia Blues were mixed. Some readers and critics praised the novel's rich emotion and nuanced characters. Kirkus Reviews wrote that the story had a "powerful emotional charge" and remarked that while many of the character types and plot devices are familiar from Burke's earlier works, the storytelling still feels fresh and impactful. A review from BookBrowse highlighted the richness of the Louisiana setting and the complex characters, noting the novel's balance between being a psychological journey and a thrilling mystery.

Other reviews were more negative. Marilyn Stasio of The New York Times wrote that the plot was forced, incoherent and excessively violent.
