= Heaven's Prisoners =

1996 film by Phil Joanou

- Theatrical release poster
- Directed by: Phil Joanou
- Screenplay by: Harley Peyton; Scott Frank
- Based on: Heaven's Prisoners by James Lee Burke
- Produced by: Albert S. Ruddy; Andre E. Morgan; Leslie Greif
- Starring: Alec Baldwin; Mary Stuart Masterson; Kelly Lynch; Teri Hatcher; Eric Roberts
- Cinematography: Harris Savides
- Edited by: William Steinkamp
- Music by: George Fenton
- Production companies: Savoy Pictures; New Line Cinema; Rank Film Distributors; PVM Entertainment
- Distributed by: New Line Cinema; Life International (Italy)
- Release date: May 17, 1996
- Running time: 132 minutes
- Country: United States
- Language: English
- Budget: $25 million
- Box office: $5,009,305

Heaven's Prisoners is a 1996 American crime thriller film directed by Phil Joanou and starring Alec Baldwin, Kelly Lynch, Mary Stuart Masterson, Teri Hatcher and Eric Roberts. It is based on a Dave Robicheaux homonymous novel by James Lee Burke. Harley Peyton and Scott Frank wrote the screenplay. It was released on May 17, 1996 by New Line Cinema.

The film was followed by In the Electric Mist (2009), starring Tommy Lee Jones as Dave Robicheaux. In the sequel, Robicheaux still lives in Louisiana and has come out of retirement as an Iberia Parish sheriff's detective.

== Plot ==
A former police detective and Vietnam veteran in New Orleans and a recovering alcoholic, Dave Robicheaux, is living a quiet life in the swamplands of Louisiana with his wife Annie. The couple's tranquility is shattered one day when a drug smuggler's plane crashes in a lake, right before their eyes.

Robicheaux succeeds in diving deep into the lake and rescuing a lone survivor from drowning, a female Salvadoran child, whom Annie quickly helped pull up from the lake and onto the boat to resuscitate her by sealing her lips over both the little girl's mouth and nostrils to administer rescue breathing.

With the arrival of a DEA officer named Dautrieve and an inherent connection to Bubba Rocque, the leading drug kingpin in the area and Robicheaux's longtime friend from New Iberia, Dave becomes involved in solving the case and consequently, finds himself, his wife, and their new adoptive daughter, Alafair, in danger.

Robicheaux is assaulted by two thugs as a warning. With help from his former girlfriend Robin, an exotic dancer who still has feelings for him, he continues to investigate. His longtime acquaintance Bubba denies any involvement, but Dave warns him and Bubba's sultry wife Claudette that he is going to find out who is behind all this and do something about it. He tracks down one of the men who attacked him, Eddie Keats, and splits his head open with a pool cue in Keat's own bar. Killers come to the Robicheaux home late one night. Robicheaux is unable to prevent his wife Annie from being killed. He falls off the wagon and neglects the young girl they adopted. Robin comes to stay with them.

Clearing his head, Robicheaux seeks vengeance against the three killers. He first goes after a large man called Toot, chasing him onto a streetcar and causing his death. Bubba and Claudette reassure a local mob boss named Giancano that they will not let this vendetta get out of hand, and Bubba gets into a fistfight with Robicheaux, falsely suspecting him of an affair with Claudette. Eddie Keats is found dead before Robicheaux can get to him. Going after the last and most dangerous of the killers, Victor Romero, he knows that someone else must be giving them orders.

He finds Romero and kills him. Then, going to Bubba's home, Robicheaux discovers that Claudette planned the hit. After overhearing Claudette confessing her plan to take over the drug business, Bubba appears and shoots Claudette, and Robicheaux calls in the crime. When he returns home, Robin has left forever, and all Robicheaux has left in his life is his daughter, Alafair.

== Cast ==
- Alec Baldwin as Dave Robicheaux
- Kelly Lynch as Annie Robicheaux
- Mary Stuart Masterson as Robin Gaddis
- Teri Hatcher as Claudette Rocque
- Eric Roberts as Bubba Rocque
- Vondie Curtis-Hall as Minos P. Dautrieve
- Hawthorne James as Victor Romero
- Badja Djola as Batist
- Joe Viterelli as Didi Giancano
- Paul Guilfoyle as Detective Magelli
- Don Stark as Eddie Keats
- Carl A. McGee as "Toot"
- Jacob "Tuck" Milligan as Jerry "Fallout"
- Samantha Lagpacan as Alafair
- Patricia Huston as Older Nun

== Production ==
Teri Hatcher recalled a awkward situation that happened while she was shooting her frontal nude scene on a balcony. "We were shooting at a beautiful old plantation house which is also a popular museum in New Orleans," said Teri. "I had been doing the scene all afternoon. I was standing on the balcony and I walked past these huge glass doors. Out of the corner of my eye I saw about 20 men and women in their seventies, just standing, staring at me as I walked past them completely naked. All I could do was burst into laughter. They were on a museum tour - caught in the wrong place at the wrong time."

== Critical reception ==
The film received generally negative reviews with a 16% "rotten" rating on Rotten Tomatoes based on 19 reviews. Audiences polled by CinemaScore gave the film an average grade of "B−" on an A+ to F scale.

Film critic Roger Ebert described the film as "such an overwrought and high-strung example of melodramatic excess that they should have scheduled rest breaks for the actors," that it "has plot enough for three films, although still not quite enough to make sense of this one," and "the material is so absurd that when the characters try to become believable, they only cast it in stark relief. Somehow a movie like this demands worse acting." Writing in The New York Times, critic Stephen Holden reported that "when the characters begin to speak, what comes out of their mouths is a stiff, stale parody of hard-boiled dialogue. No matter how sinister they look, you just don't believe them," and described the film as "[d]isjointed and ponderously paced." Teri Hatcher's performance earned her a Golden Raspberry Award nomination for Worst Supporting Actress.

The film grossed $2,308,797 its opening weekend playing in a total of 907 theaters, with the final gross being $5,009,305, far below its $25,000,000 budget.
