= OUTSOUTH Queer Film Festival =

American LGBTQ+ film festival

OutSouth Queer Film Festival
- Front of Carolina Theatre during 2018 festival
- Location: Durham, North Carolina
- Predecessor: North Carolina Gay & Lesbian Film Festival
- Established: 1995
- Website: Official Website

The OUTSOUTH Queer Film Festival is an annual LGBT film festival produced by the Carolina Theatre in Durham, North Carolina, typically held in mid-August. The festival has been credited in previous years as the second largest LGBT film/video festival in the Southeastern United States. It has been consistently hosted in the same venue each year.

The festival debuted in 1995 as the Q Film Fest, renaming itself in the following year to North Carolina Gay & Lesbian Film Festival. In 2020, festival organizers announced that the festival would change its name again to OutSouth Queer Film Festival.

== Programming ==
OUTSOUTH is international in its focus, screening and occasionally opening selected films and inviting filmmakers and actors from the screened films to attend. The three individual theater venues are in the same building and each are dedicated to the festival's programming.

The festival's program size has varied over the years. For many of its first years, the festival was typically a four-day event (Thursday through Sunday) and has attracted an average of 10,000 patrons each year. In 2012, OUTSOUTH expanded to a full week, bridging across two weekends. The festival has since reduced back down to a four-day program with an extended Après-Fest in the week following.

== Awards ==
The Festival has given a variety of awards to screened films over the years. Awards have been historically divided into Men's, Women's, and Trans categories and also divided on film length.

Audience Awards
Year	Category	Winner	Reference
2011	Men's International Short	Boys Like You	
2012	Men's Feature	The Men Next Door	
2012	Women's Feature	Cloudburst	
2012	Documentary	Wish Me Away	
2013	Men's Feature	Southern Baptist Sissies	
2014	Men's Feature	More Scenes from a Gay Marriage	
2014	Women's Feature	Tru Love	
2014	Short Film	Electric Indigo	
2015	Men's Feature	Better Half and Upstairs Inferno (tie)	
2015	Women's Feature	Margarita with a Straw	
2015	Trans Feature	From This Day Forward	
2016	Men's Feature	What's the Matter with Gerald?	
2016	Women's International Short	Rose	
2016	Documentary	The Freedom to Marry	
2017	Men's Feature	A Very Sordid Wedding	
2017	Trans Feature	Apricot Groves	
2017	Documentary	Behind the Curtain: Todrick Hall	
2018	Men's Feature	My Big Gay Italian Wedding	
2018	Women's Feature	Freelancers Anonymous	
2018	Trans Feature	Transmilitary	
2018	Documentary	To a More Perfect Union: U.S. v Windsor	
2018	Short	Kick the Can	
2019	Comedy Film	These Thems	
2019	Drama Film	From Zero to I Love You	
2019	Foreign Film	The Shiny Shrimps	
2019	Documentary Film	Gay Chorus Deep South	
2021	Short Film	The Forgotten Place	
2023	Documentary	Studio One Forever	
2023	Narrative Feature	Two Lives in Pittsburgh	
2024	Short Film	Sunflowers at Night	

Jury Awards
Year	Category	Winner	Reference
2012	Men's International Short	House for Sale	
2013	Men's Feature	Scenes from a Gay Marriage	
2014	Men's Feature	More Scenes from a Gay Marriage	
2015	Men's Feature	4th Man Out	
2015	Women's Feature	ALTO	
2016	Men's Feature	Retake	
2016	Women's Feature	AWOL	
2016	Trans Feature	Girls Lost	
2017	Men's International Short	Sisak	
2017	Women's Long Form Short	Lily	
2017	Women's Feature	Cat Skin	
2017	Trans International Short	Dusk	
2017	Trans Feature	Apricot Groves	
2018	Men's Feature	Evening Shadows	
2018	Men's International Short	Freefall and Turn It Around (tie)	
2018	Men's Short	The Date Project	
2018	Women's Feature	Freelancers Anonymous	
2018	Women's International Short	Marguerite	
2018	Trans Feature	Transmilitary	
2018	Trans International Short	Something About Alex	
2019	Drama Feature	The Garden Left Behind	
2019	Lesbian Web Series	Anne Plus	
2019	Long Form Dramatic Short	Miller & Son	
2019	Romantic Comedy Feature	2 in the Bush: A Love Story	
2019	US Drama Short	Brothers	
2019	US Feature	Last Ferry	
2019	US Comedy Short	The Handyman	
2019	Men's International Short	Carlito Leaves Forever	
2019	Emerging Short	Masks	
2020	Short	One More Please	
2021	Short	Sheer Qorma	
2021	Long Form Dramatic Short	Fabiu	
2022	Men's International Short	Neuzeit	
