= Maxwell Acee Donovan =

American actor (born 2005)

- Born: May 14, 2005 (age 21); Baltimore, Maryland, US
- Education: Los Angeles County High School for the Arts
- Occupation: Actor
- Years active: 2013–present
- Known for: Gabby Duran & the Unsittables, That '90s Show

Maxwell Acee Donovan (born May 14, 2005) is an American actor. He is known for his starring role as Wesley Presley in the Disney Channel science-fiction comedy series Gabby Duran & the Unsittables, as Nate Runck in the Netflix sitcom That '90s Show, and as Ethan Macintosh in the Prime Video Thriller "The Better Sister".

== Early life and education ==
Donovan was born in Baltimore, Maryland and grew up in Glenwood Springs, Colorado. His last name, Acee, comes from his Lebanese heritage. He attended the Los Angeles County High School for the Arts, where he studied filmmaking.

== Career ==
After some minor roles in television and film, Donovan gained prominence for his role as Wesley, the conspiracy theorist best friend of the main character, in the Disney Channel series Gabby Duran & the Unsittables, which ran from 2019 to 2021.

In 2023, he began starring as Nate Runck, the well-meaning but naïve older brother of Gwen, in the Netflix series That '90s Show, a sequel to That '70s Show.

In 2025, Donovan featured in the limited series, The Better Sister, streaming on Amazon Prime. The series also starred Jessica Biel and Elizabeth Banks.

In 2026, Maxwell made his directorial debut with the short-form web series, ""Road to Healing", streaming on YouTube. His sister, Clare Margaret, wrote and starred alongside many of his past cast-mates.

== Filmography ==
=== Film ===
Year	Title	Role	Notes
2016	An American Girl Story: Maryellen 1955 - Extraordinary Christmas	Davy Fenstermacher	Television film
2016	War Dogs	Ralph's Son	Uncredited
2016	Good Kids	Young Plymouth Rock	
2020	Painter	Young Ryan West	

=== Television ===
Year	Title	Role	Notes
2013	The Thundermans	Mervis	Episode: "This Looks Like a Job For..."
2015	Bunk'd	Illegal Candy Buyer	Episode: "Smells Like Camp Spirit"
2018	Station 19	Kyle	Episode: "I'm the One"
2019–2021	Gabby Duran & the Unsittables	Wesley Presley	Main role
2023–24	That '90s Show	Nate Runck	Main role
2025	The Better Sister	Ethan Macintosh	Main role
2025	A Star Brighter Than the Sun	Koki Kamishiro	Voice role, English dub
