= James Lee Burke =

American author (born 1936)

- Born: December 5, 1936 (age 89); Houston, Texas, U.S.
- Education: University of Louisiana at Lafayette; University of Missouri (BA, MA)
- Occupations: Writer, novelist
- Children: 4 (including Alafair Burke)
- Website: www.jamesleeburke.com

James Lee Burke (born December 5, 1936) is an American author, best known for his Dave Robicheaux series. The Robicheaux character has been portrayed twice on screen, first by Alec Baldwin (Heaven's Prisoners) and then Tommy Lee Jones (In the Electric Mist).

His 1986 novel The Lost Get-back Boogie was nominated for a Pulitzer Prize. Burke has won three Edgar Awards, and in 2009 was presented with the Grand Master Award from the Mystery Writers of America.

== Biography ==
Burke was born in Houston, Texas, but spent most of his childhood on the Texas-Louisiana Gulf Coast. He attended the University of Louisiana at Lafayette and University of Missouri, receiving Bachelor of Arts and Master of Arts degrees in English literature from the latter.

He worked in a variety of jobs over the years, while books he had written were rejected, and books he had published went out of print. At various times, he worked as a truck driver for the U.S. Forest Service, as a newspaper reporter, as a social worker on Skid Row, Los Angeles, as a land surveyor in Colorado, in the Louisiana State unemployment system, and in the Job Corps in the Daniel Boone National Forest in eastern Kentucky.

He taught at the University of Missouri as a grad student, then at the University of Louisiana, the University of Montana, and Miami-Dade Community College, before settling in Wichita, Kansas to teach at Wichita State University in 1978.

== Reception ==
Wirt Williams, reviewing Burke's first novel, Half of Paradise (1965), in the New York Times, compared his writing to Jean-Paul Sartre and Ernest Hemingway, but concluded "Mr. Burkes' literary forebear is Thomas Hardy."

== Personal life ==
Burke and his wife, Pearl (née Pai Chu), owned homes in Lolo, Montana, and in New Iberia, Louisiana. Pearl died in June 2026, aged 92. They had four children, including Alafair Burke, a law professor and best-selling crime writer. Daughter Pamala Burke McDavid died in 2020. Extended family include cousins novelist Elizabeth Nell Dubus and author and actress DeLauné Michel. Burke is a practicing Roman Catholic.

== Adaptations ==
Burke's 1982 novel, Two for Texas, was made into a 1998 TV movie of the same name.

The Robicheaux character has been portrayed twice on screen, first by Alec Baldwin in the 1996 film Heaven's Prisoners and then in 2009 by Tommy Lee Jones in the sequel In the Electric Mist.

== Awards and recognition ==
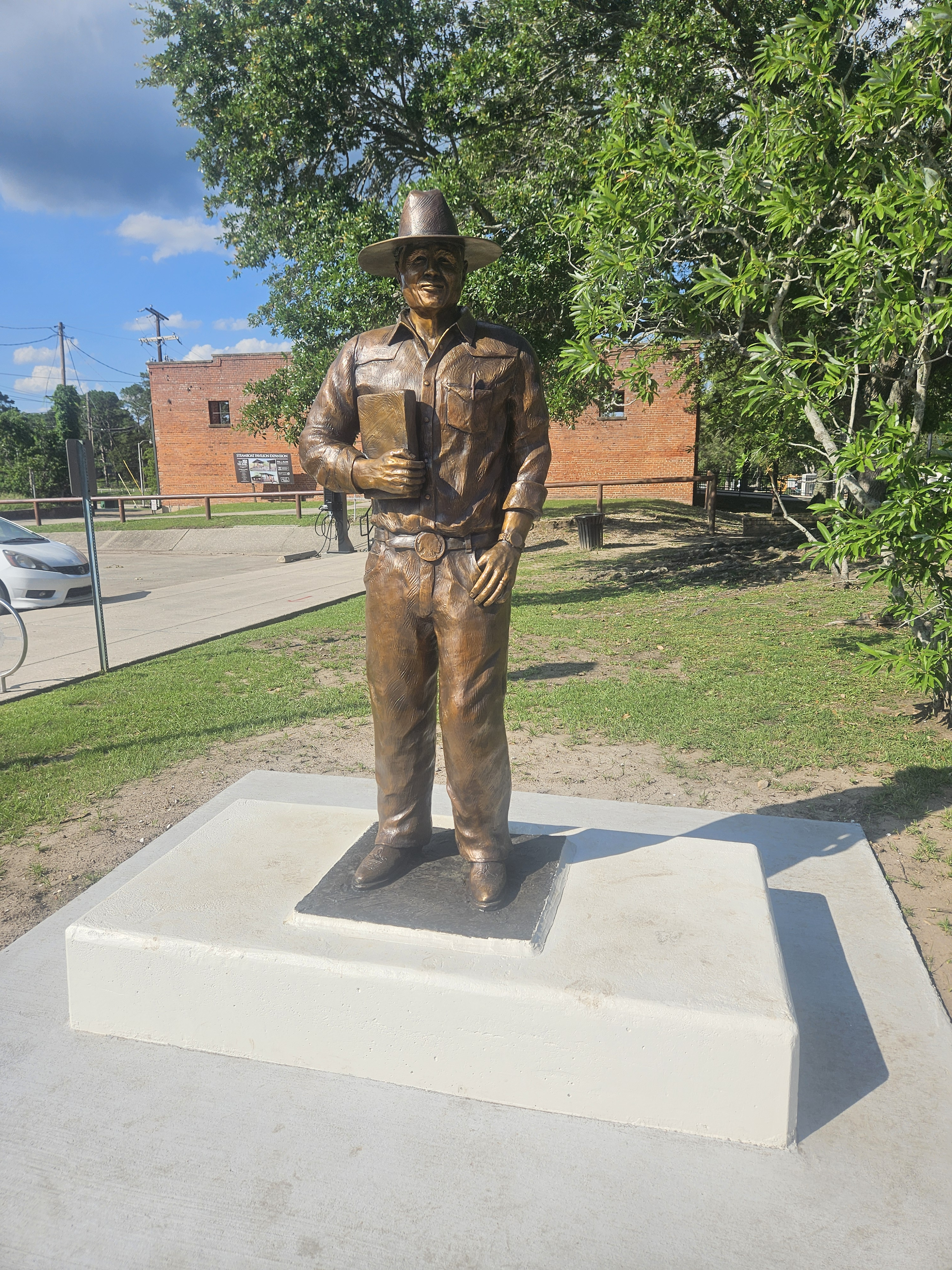
Statue honoring Burke in New Iberia, Louisiana.

In 1986 Burke's novel The Lost Get-back Boogie was nominated for a Pulitzer Prize.

In 1988 Burke was awarded a John Simon Guggenheim Fellowship for Creative Arts in Fiction.

Burke has won three Edgar Awards for his novels Black Cherry Blues (1990), Cimarron Rose (1998), and Flags on the Bayou (2024).

Burke received the 2002 Louisiana Writer Award for his enduring contribution to the "literary intellectual heritage of Louisiana." The award was presented by the then-Lieutenant-Governor of Louisiana, Kathleen Blanco, on November 2, 2002, at a ceremony held at the inaugural Louisiana Book Festival in Baton Rouge.

In 2009 Burke received the MWA's Grand Master Award. A mystery novelist rarely wins both an Edgar award and a Guggenheim fellowship.

In 2024 he was named winner of the Crime Writers' Association of Britain's Diamond Dagger award for his outstanding lifetime's contribution to the crime and mystery fiction genre.

A statue of Burke was erected in downtown New Iberia, Louisiana in April 2024.

== Published works ==
=== Dave Robicheaux ===
1. The Neon Rain (1987)
2. Heaven's Prisoners (1988)
3. Black Cherry Blues (1989)
4. A Morning for Flamingos (1990)
5. A Stained White Radiance (1992)
6. In the Electric Mist with Confederate Dead (1993)
7. Dixie City Jam (1994)
8. Burning Angel (1995)
9. Cadillac Jukebox (1996)
10. Sunset Limited (1998)
11. Purple Cane Road (2000)
12. Jolie Blon's Bounce (2002)
13. Last Car to Elysian Fields (2003)
14. Crusader's Cross (2005)
15. Pegasus Descending (2006)
16. The Tin Roof Blowdown (2007)
17. Swan Peak (2008)
18. The Glass Rainbow (2010)
19. Creole Belle (2012)
20. Light of the World (2013)
21. Robicheaux (2018)
22. The New Iberia Blues (2019)
23. A Private Cathedral (2020)
24. Clete (2024)
25. The Hadacol Boogie (2026)

=== Billy Bob Holland ===
1. Cimarron Rose (1997)
2. Heartwood (1999)
3. Bitterroot (2001)
4. In the Moon of Red Ponies (2004)

=== Hackberry Holland ===
1. Lay Down My Sword and Shield (1971)
2. Rain Gods (2009)
3. Feast Day of Fools (2011)

=== Holland Family Saga ===
1. Wayfaring Stranger (2014)
2. House of the Rising Sun (2015)
3. The Jealous Kind (2016)
4. Another Kind of Eden (2021)
5. Every Cloak Rolled in Blood (2022)
6. Don't Forget Me, Little Bessie (2025)

=== Miscellaneous ===
- Half of Paradise (1965)
- To The Bright and Shining Sun (1970)
- Two for Texas (1982)
- The Lost Get-Back Boogie (1986)
- White Doves at Morning (2002)
- Flags on the Bayou (2023)

=== Short-story collections ===
1. The Convict (1985)
2. Jesus Out to Sea (2007)
3. Harbor Lights (2024)
