= Gabriel Sloyer =

American actor

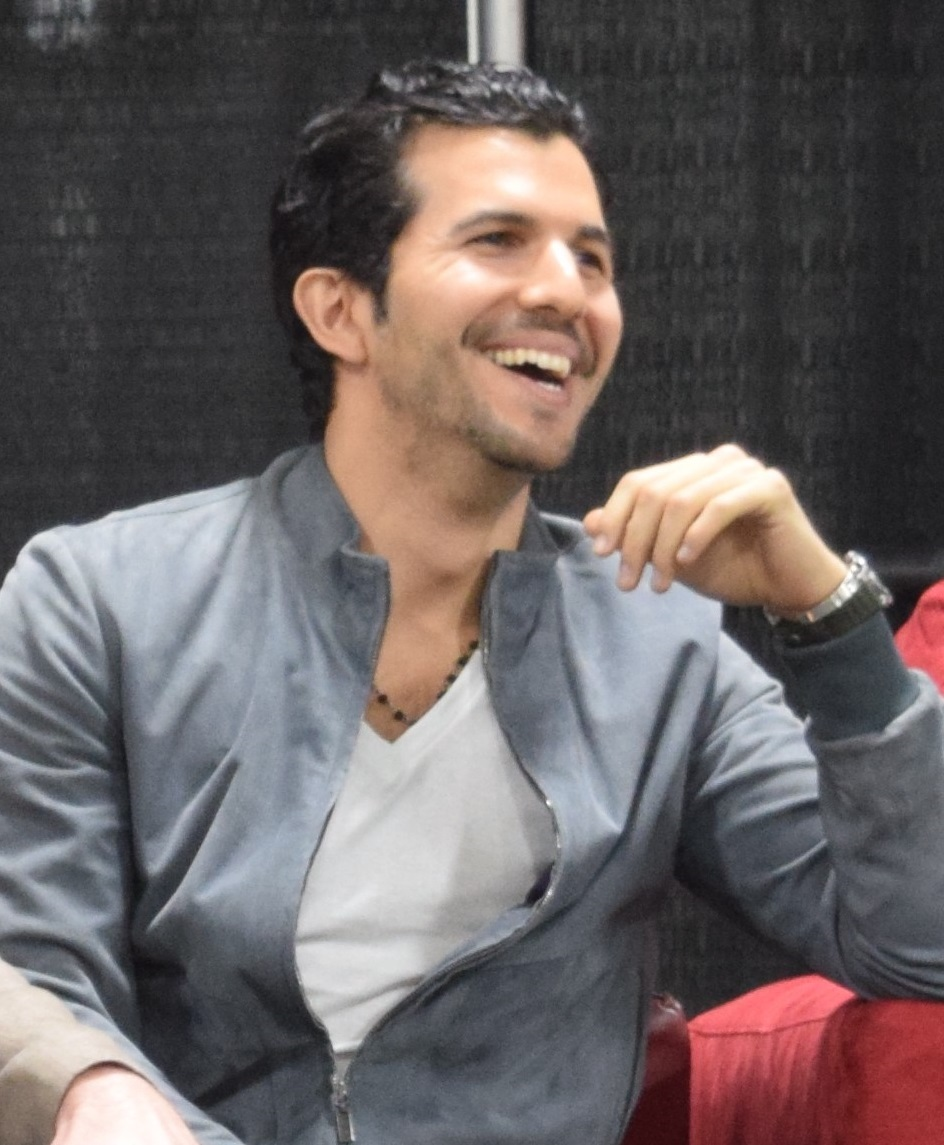
- Sloyer at the 2019 Great Philadelphia Comic Con
- Born: Long Island, New York, U.S.
- Occupation: Actor
- Years active: 2010–present

Gabriel Sloyer is an actor who is best known for the Amazon original series, The Better Sister, as well as recurring roles on Inventing Anna and Griselda and his performance capture as Javier Escuella on Red Dead Redemption 2.

== Filmography ==
=== Film ===
| Year | Title | Role | Notes |
|---|---|---|---|
| 2010 | Department of Homeland (in)Security | Carlos | Short |
| 2015 | Straight Outta Tompkins | Antonio | |
| 2015 | Stealing Chanel | Pico | |
| 2015 | Daniel. Noah. | Daniel | Short |
| 2016 | Lullaby | Danny | Short |
| 2017 | With Children | Matthew | Short |
| 2017 | Cocked and Locked | - | Short |
| 2017 | Brawl in Cell Block 99 | M.P.V. | |
| 2017 | Alina | Santo | |
| 2018 | Breaking Brooklyn | Castro | |
| 2018 | Murder at the Mansion | Sebastian | TV movie |
| 2019 | Last Ferry | Dr. Anabi | |
| 2019 | All In | Peppi | |
| 2019 | 39 and a Half | Jorge | |
| 2022 | Christmas with You | Ricardo | |
| 2025 | I Love this Arrangement | Matt | Short |

=== Television ===
| Year | Title | Role | Notes |
|---|---|---|---|
| 2013 | Parker & Steve | Clarence | Episode: "Same Old New" |
| 2013 | Pushing Dreams | Cary 'The Producer' | Episode: "Pushing Dreams 4 & 5" |
| 2015 | Limitless | Marco Ramos | Episode: "The Legend of Marco Ramos" |
| 2015 | The Blacklist | Gabriel Costa | Episode: "Eli Matchett (No. 72)" |
| 2015 | Jessica Jones | Trainer | Episode: "AKA Crush Syndrome" |
| 2016 | I Love You... But I Lied | Graham Logan | Episode: "Torn" |
| 2016 | Power | Hugo | Recurring Cast: Season 3 |
| 2017 | Narcos | Manuel de Dios Unane | Recurring Cast: Season 3 |
| 2018 | Orange Is the New Black | Felipe | Episode: "State of the Uterus" |
| 2019 | Alternatino with Arturo Castro | Luis | Episode: "The Teammate" |
| 2020 | Emergence | Francis | Episode: "Applied Sciences" |
| 2022 | Inventing Anna | Gabriel Calatrava | Recurring Cast |
| 2022 | Blue Bloods | Benny Fernandez | Episode: "Where We Stand" |
| 2022 | The Wilds | Elias Garcia | Episode: "Day 34/12" |
| 2022 | The Equalizer | Omar Delgado | Guest Cast: Season 2–3 |
| 2023 | Law & Order: Organized Crime | Nestor Castillo | Episode: "Trap" |
| 2023 | True Lies | Tomas | Episode: "Working Vacation" |
| 2023 | FBI: Most Wanted | Carlos Morales | Episode: "Clean House" |
| 2024 | Griselda | Raúl Díaz | Recurring Cast |
| 2025 | The Better Sister | Jake Rodriguez | Main Cast |

=== Video games ===
| Year | Title | Role | Notes |
|---|---|---|---|
| 2013 | Grand Theft Auto V | Oscar Guzman (voice) | also motion capture |
| 2018 | Red Dead Redemption 2 | Javier Escuella (performance capture) | |
| 2025 | Grand Theft Auto Online | Oscar Guzman (voice) | Oscar Guzman Flies Again update (also motion capture) |
