= The Better Sister =

American television series

- Genre: Thriller
- Created by: Olivia Milch
- Based on: The Better Sister by Alafair Burke
- Starring: Jessica Biel; Elizabeth Banks; Corey Stoll; Maxwell Acee Donovan; Gabriel Sloyer; Kim Dickens; Bobby Naderi; Matthew Modine; Lorraine Toussaint; Gloria Reuben
- Music by: Will Bates
- Country of origin: United States
- Original language: English
- No. of episodes: 8

Production
- Executive producers: Regina Corrado; Olivia Milch; Craig Gillespie; Marty Adelstein; Becky Clements; Alissa Bachner; Jessica Biel; Michelle Purple; Elizabeth Banks; Annie Marter; Kerry Orent
- Producer: James Crowell
- Cinematography: Isiah Donté Lee; Duane Manwiller
- Editors: Tatiana S. Riegel; Erica Freed; Gershon Hinkson; Jonah Moran; Dave Labich
- Running time: 53–61 minutes
- Production companies: Brownstone Productions; Iron Ocean; Puny Voice; Pentimento Productions; Fortunate Jack; Tomorrow Studios; Amazon MGM Studios

Original release
- Network: Amazon Prime Video
- Release: May 29, 2025

The Better Sister is an American thriller television limited series created by Olivia Milch and starring Jessica Biel, Elizabeth Banks, Corey Stoll, and Maxwell Acee Donovan. Based on the 2019 novel by Alafair Burke, it premiered on May 29, 2025.

== Premise ==
Two estranged sisters, Chloe (Jessica Biel) and Nicky (Elizabeth Banks), one married to and the other divorced from the same man, Adam (Corey Stoll), are forced together after he is murdered.

== Cast ==
=== Main ===
- Jessica Biel as Chloe Taylor, the editor-in-chief of The Real Thing magazine
- Elizabeth Banks as Nicky Macintosh, Chloe's estranged, alcoholic older sister
- Corey Stoll as Adam Macintosh, Chloe's husband and Nicky's ex-husband
- Maxwell Acee Donovan as Ethan Macintosh, Nicky and Adam's biological son
- Gabriel Sloyer as Jake Rodriguez, an attorney at Adam's law firm and Chloe's lover
- Kim Dickens as Detective Nancy "Nan" Guidry, an East Hampton detective who is investigating Adam's murder
- Bobby Naderi as Detective Matt Bowen, Nancy's police partner who is investigating Adam's murder
- Matthew Modine as Bill Braddock, a founding partner of the law firm where Adam and Jake work
- Lorraine Toussaint as Catherine Lancaster, The Real Thing's publisher and Chloe's mentor and friend
- Gloria Reuben as Michelle Sanders, the lawyer recommended by Jake to represent Ethan

=== Recurring ===
- Michael J. Harney as Doorman Arty, the doorman at the building where Chloe, Adam, and Ethan live in Manhattan
- Janel Moloney as Sheila, Chloe and Nicky's mother
- Frederick Weller as Hank, Chloe and Nicky's father
- John Finn as Clark, the East Hampton chief of police and Nan and Matt's boss
- Paul Sparks as Ken, Nicky's love interest whom she meets at an AA meeting in East Hampton
- Frank Pando as Edward Olivero, a FBI agent who has been blackmailing Adam and Jake

== Episodes ==
| No. | Title | Directed by | Written by | Original release date |
|---|---|---|---|---|
| 1 | "She's My Sister" | Craig Gillespie | Olivia Milch | May 29, 2025 |
| 2 | "Lotta Sky" | Leslie Hope | Regina Corrado | May 29, 2025 |
| 3 | "Incoming Widow" | Leslie Hope | Ariel Doctoroff | May 29, 2025 |
| 4 | "Gazpacho" | Azazel Jacobs | Brittany Dushame & Lauren Stremmel | May 29, 2025 |
| 5 | "Just Ask" | Dawn Wilkinson | Regina Corrado | May 29, 2025 |
| 6 | "Steadying Hand" | Dawn Wilkinson | Olivia Milch | May 29, 2025 |
| 7 | "Back from Red" | Stephanie Laing | Regina Corrado | May 29, 2025 |
| 8 | "They're In Their World" | Stephanie Laing | Olivia Milch | May 29, 2025 |

== Production ==
The series is an adaptation by Olivia Milch and Regina Corrado of the 2019 novel The Better Sister by Alafair Burke. Burke acts as a consultant on the series which has Elizabeth Banks as co-star and executive producer via Brownstone Productions, and Jessica Biel as co-star and executive producer via Iron Ocean Films, along with Michelle Purple. Craig Gillespie will direct in addition to being an executive producer, along with Annie Marter through Fortunate Jack Productions. The series is a co-production between Tomorrow Studios and Amazon MGM Studios, with Marty Adelstein, Becky Clements, and Alissa Bachner of Tomorrow Studios executive producing.

In June 2024, Corey Stoll, Maxwell Acee Donovan, Gabriel Sloyer, Kim Dickens, and Bobby Naderi joined the cast.

Filming began in New York in June 2024, and wrapped in October 2024.

== Release ==
The series was released on Amazon Prime Video with all eight episodes on May 29, 2025.

== Reception ==
The review aggregator website Rotten Tomatoes reported a 70% approval rating based on 33 critic reviews. The website's critics consensus reads, "A dense mystery with nods towards moral ambiguity, Better Sister is too derivative for its surprises to properly land but gets a dramatic lift from the appealing pairing of Elizabeth Banks and Jessica Biel." Metacritic, which uses a weighted average, gave a score of 56 out of 100 based on 13 critics, indicating "mixed or average".
