= Purple Cane Road =

2000 crime novel by James Lee Burke

- Author: James Lee Burke
- Language: English
- Series: Dave Robicheaux
- Genre: Detective novel
- Publisher: Simon & Schuster
- Publication date: 2000
- Publication place: United States
- Media type: Print (hardback & paperback)
- Pages: 400 pp
- ISBN: 0440224047
- Followed by: Jolie Blon's Bounce

Purple Cane Road is a crime novel by James Lee Burke.

== Plot summary ==
Dave Robicheaux, former officer for the New Orleans Police Department and before that a U.S. Army infantry lieutenant who fought in the Vietnam War, works as sheriff's deputy in New Iberia, Louisiana. In this book, he discovers new evidence in a murder case and additional leads in the disappearance of his mother, a longstanding subplot to this series.

== Reception ==
Publishers Weekly gave it a starred review. Kirkus gave it a positive review. Writing for The New York Times, Richard Bernstein was intrigued by the book but found it, "so devoted to its own appearances, that it comes across as almost a commentary on itself rather than as something real..." A reviewer in the Houston Chronicle stated, "James Lee Burke scores again with great characters."

== Release details ==
- 2000, USA, Simon & Schuster, New York, ISBN 0440224047
