= Gabby Duran & the Unsittables =

American television series

- Genre: Sci-fi; Comedy
- Created by: Mike Alber & Gabe Snyder
- Based on: Gabby Duran and the Unsittables by Elise Allen and Daryle Conners
- Starring: Kylie Cantrall; Maxwell Acee Donovan; Callan Farris; Coco Christo; Valery Ortiz; Nathan Lovejoy
- Theme music composer: Joacim Persson; Johan Alkenas; Paula Winger
- Opening theme: "I Do My Thing" by Kylie Cantrall
- Composer: Oleksa Lozowchuk
- Country of origin: United States
- Original language: English
- No. of seasons: 2
- No. of episodes: 39

Production
- Executive producers: Mike Alber & Gabe Snyder; Joe Nussbaum; Brian Hamilton; Bridget Hill
- Producers: Ian Hay; Ian R. Smith; Colleen Mitchell
- Production location: Vancouver, Canada
- Cinematography: Toby Gorman
- Camera setup: Single-camera
- Running time: 24 minutes
- Production companies: Omnifilm Entertainment; Two Gorgeous Gentlemen

Original release
- Network: Disney Channel
- Release: October 11, 2019 – November 26, 2021

Gabby Duran & the Unsittables is an American science fiction comedy television series created by Mike Alber and Gabe Snyder that aired on Disney Channel from October 11, 2019 to November 26, 2021. Based on the novel Gabby Duran and the Unsittables by Elise Allen and Daryle Conners, the series stars Kylie Cantrall, Maxwell Acee Donovan, Callan Farris, Coco Christo, Valery Ortiz, and Nathan Lovejoy.

== Premise ==
After living in the shadows of her successful mother Dina and smart younger sister Olivia even when they move to Havensburg, Colorado, Gabby Duran finds her moment to shine when she gets a job from Principal Swift to babysit an unruly group of extraterrestrial children who have been hiding out on Earth disguised as humans. Gabby resourcefully and fearlessly steps up to the challenge to protect the children and their secret identities.

== Cast and characters ==
=== Main ===
- Kylie Cantrall as Gabby Duran, a resourceful and courageous 13-year-old girl who finally gets her moment to shine after landing a job to babysit extraterrestrial children.
- Maxwell Acee Donovan as Wesley Presley, Gabby's best friend and a conspiracy theorist. In "Wesley and the Fischman", he finds out about Gabby's babysitting job. In "Beware the Fright Master!", it is revealed that Wesley originally took up the Fright Master identity back in 4th grade to scare his gym teacher.
- Callan Farris as Jeremy, a shape-shifting blob alien called a Gor-Mon from the planet Gor-Monia and Gabby's first babysitting assignment who is the heir to the Gor-Monite throne. In the episode "Enter the Dranis," it is revealed that Jeremy's real name is Franis and has begun to see Julius as a friend. Farris also voices Jeremy's Gor-Mon form.
- Coco Christo as Olivia, Gabby's overachieving younger sister. She finds out about Gabby's babysitting job around "Wesley Jr." and "The Note" where she considers the aliens dangerous until she meets Jeremy.
- Valery Ortiz as Dina, Gabby's caring and career-driven mother who works as a news reporter at Channel 6.
- Nathan Lovejoy as Principal Swift, the principal of Havensburg Junior High, a Gor-Mon, and the uncle of Jeremy who enlists Gabby to babysit Jeremy and other alien children. In the episode "Enter the Dranis," it is revealed that his real name is Granis and is the brother of Gor-Monia's Supreme Leader who he has a poor relationship with. Lovejoy also voices Swift's Gor-Mon form.

=== Recurring ===
- Laara Sadiq as Orb, a Gor-Monite Technological Orb that works for Principal Swift and keeps an eye on Jeremy when Principal Swift is occupied
- Kheon Clarke as Julius, a waiter at Luchachos
- Elle McKinnon as Sky, a telepathic alien girl who becomes Gabby's friend
- Brent Clark as Sky's Dad, the unnamed father of Sky
- Ricardo Ortiz as Jace, a charitable but oblivious boy who is Gabby's former love interest
- Mia Bella as Kali, a warrior alien girl from a war-ridden planet
- Bracken Hanke as Susie, Gabby's rival and a neighborhood babysitter who takes her job very seriously
- Alex Rose as Glor-Bron, a boastful Gor-Monite who is Principal Swift's rival. Rose also voices his Gor-Monite form.
- Jeremy Davis as Howard, a student at Havensburg Junior High who is the best basketball player
- Ryan Beil as Blurt, a Blorg alien who is the proprietor of an underground alien pawn shop called Blurt's

== Production ==
On August 3, 2018, Disney Channel green-lit the sci-fi comedy series as a straight-to-series order, with production underway in Vancouver, Canada, for a 2019 premiere. Kirby Buckets' Mike Alber and Gabe Snyder serve as showrunners and executive producers. Just Add Magic's Joe Nussbaum also serves as executive producer. Grey's Anatomy's Nzingha Stewart directed the first episode. On August 2, 2019, it was revealed that the series would premiere in October 2019. On August 29, 2019, Disney Channel announced an exact premiere date of October 11, 2019. The series is a production of Gabby Productions, Ltd. On October 7, 2019, it was announced that Disney Channel renewed the series for a second season ahead of its series premiere. On December 6, 2021, it was announced that the series was canceled after two seasons.

== Episodes ==
=== Series overview ===
Season	Episodes	Originally released	
Season	Episodes	First released	Last released
1	19	October 11, 2019	March 20, 2020
2	20	June 4, 2021	November 26, 2021

=== Season 1 (2019–20) ===
No. overall	No. in season	Title	Directed by	Written by	Original release date	Prod. code	U.S. viewers (millions)
1	1	"So Your Gor-Monite Child Is Going to Explode"	Nzingha Stewart	Mike Alber & Gabe Snyder	October 11, 2019	101	0.57
Having moved to Havensburg with her sister Olivia and mother Dina, Gabby Duran has been uncomfortable. After one ploy to get herself expelled, Gabby is sent to apologize to Principal Swift, the principal of her new school. When Gabby has an encounter with a blob-like alien, she is roped into babysitting alien children by Principal Swift, who is also an alien. Gabby's first job is babysitting Jeremy, Principal Swift's alien nephew, and must work to keep him from exploding after he has a lot of soda. Guest stars: Rasik Rana as Fish Boy, Natalie Harris as Fish Mom, Tommy Europe as Android Dad
2	2	"Wesley and the Fischman"	Joe Nussbaum	Mike Alber & Gabe Snyder	October 18, 2019	102	0.49
Principal Swift wants Gabby to choose between her babysitting job and her friend Wesley. During this time, Gabby's next client is a fish-like alien named Stuart who comes from the planet Vitrious Prime. When Wesley barges into Principal Swift's house and accidentally scares Stuart, Gabby ropes him into getting Stuart back before anyone sees him. Meanwhile, Jeremy and Principal Swift try to learn about human culture, but their attempts do not end well.
3	3	"Crybaby Duran"	Joe Nussbaum	Heather MacGillvray & Linda Mathious	October 25, 2019	103	0.53
Gabby hears a rumor that she was a crybaby when she first moved to Havensburg. She enlists a telepathic alien named Sky, who she is babysitting, to help her figure out who started the rumor. Gabby disguises Sky as a human and brings her to school. When a large group of students bump into her, Sky gets overloaded by all of their thoughts. Gabby turns to Principal Swift for help. To save Sky, they must download all of those thoughts into Gabby's mind. Gabby realizes that everyone has their own problems and she shouldn't worry about the rumor. Meanwhile, Wesley agrees to stay in Sky's room and fool Sky's father by pretending to be her. While there, he notices that their dog looks like his lost dog, Brisket, whom he suspects to have been abducted by aliens. Guest star: Elle McKinnon as Sky Absent: Coco Christo as Olivia, Valery Ortiz as Dina
4	4	"Crushin' It"	Sean McNamara	Lacey Dyer & Julia Layton	November 1, 2019	106	0.50
Gabby develops a crush on a boy named Jace but she wants nothing to do with romance. She is assigned to babysit a warrior alien girl named Kali who offers to help her get rid of her crush. She and Kali sign up for Jace's little buddy charity event, hoping that if she sees Jace being disgusting, she will stop being attracted to him. However, this does not work. While talking to Jace, Gabby panics and rides their ATV into the woods. Jace and his little buddy ride after them to stop them but Kali attacks him with a beehive. On his way to the hospital, Gabby tries to confess her love for him but Jace rejects her and blames her for ruining his life. Meanwhile, after hearing about Gabby's crush and misinterpreting romantic comedies, Principal Swift and Jeremy conclude that love is a disease and they must save Gabby. Guest stars: Ricardo Ortiz as Jace, Mia Bella as Kali Absent: Coco Christo as Olivia, Valery Ortiz as Dina
5	5	"Olivia Gone Wild"	Keith Samples	Adam Aseraf & Hunter Cope	November 15, 2019	104	0.34
Gabby is unable to watch Olivia, so Dina enlists a self-proclaimed "super-sitter" named Susie Glover to babysit her. This causes a competition between Gabby and Susie which results in Susie locking Gabby in her room so that she can take Olivia to a carnival that is in town. Meanwhile, Wesley secretly watches over Jeremy while Principal Swift is away. Jeremy fools Wesley with a simulation that causes him to think that he accidentally blew up the planets of Gabby's clients. After breaking out of her room, Gabby accidentally feeds Olivia some candy that the Orb cautioned her about that overfills her with joy causing Gabby and Susie to work together to get Olivia calm. Gabby manages to calm Olivia down with a plush animal. When Dina asks about the door to Gabby's room being broken down, Olivia states that Susie locked Gabby in. This causes Dina to give Susie a zero-star review and Dina then has Susie reattach Gabby's bedroom door. As Gabby and Olivia return to the carnival before it closes for the night, Susie secretly plans to have her revenge on Gabby. Guest star: Bracken Hanke as Susie Absent: Nathan Lovejoy as Principal Swift
6	6	"Día de la Dina"	Sean McNamara	Eugene Garcia-Cross	November 22, 2019	107	0.46
Día de la Dina is coming up. As Olivia works on her present for her mother, Gabby plans to come up with a gift to make up for a vomiting incident that occurred last year when Gabby took her to Clams Casino. She ropes Wesley and Jeremy into helping her make a gift. Meanwhile, Principal Swift prepares for his return to Gor-Mon when his assignment on Earth is almost done. Guest stars: Alex Rose as Glor-Bron, Laara Sadiq as Orb
7	7	"The Darkness"	Leslie Kolins Small	Ben Glass	November 29, 2019	108	0.33
After losing the opportunity to become the chief advisor to the King of Gor-Monia to another Gor-Mon and having his stay extended, Principal Swift has entered a type of depression referred to by Gor-Mons as "The Darkness". During Swift's absence, Vice Principal Kipper becomes the acting principal. Gabby must work with the Orb to get Principal Swift out of "The Darkness". Meanwhile, Jeremy has shapeshifted into an object during his uncle's disappearance and Wesley assumes that he has turned into a watermelon that he works to keep safe. Guest stars: Zibby Allen as Kipper, Laara Sadiq as Orb Absent: Coco Christo as Olivia, Valery Ortiz as Dina
8	8	"It's Christmas, Gabby Duran!"	Joe Nussbaum	Huong Nguyen	December 6, 2019	112	0.42
It's Christmas time, and Gabby and Olivia are looking forward to spending Christmas with their separated father Bruce, who is coming in from Miami. When Bruce's transfer from Chicago is delayed, Olivia becomes upset. To please Olivia, Gabby enlists Principal Swift to pose as Bruce until he can arrive. Meanwhile, Jeremy thinks that Santa Claus is an evil alien warlord and enlists Wesley to help set up traps to catch him, though they reach a complication when they have ordered out for pizza. Guest star: Dan Payne as Bruce
9	9	"The Party King and Timbuk, Too"	Keith Samples	Mike Alber & Gabe Snyder	December 13, 2019	105	0.39
Dina grounds Gabby after she took the garbage she was supposed to throw out and tried to drop it into the trash can from her window only to hit Dina's car. Principal Swift drops Jeremy off at Gabby's so that he can finish some Gor-Monite business. Gabby starts to throw a birthday party for Jeremy as he never had one where he invites all of his alien friends to attend which includes an Alstablocian named Timbuk where things start to get out of control. Meanwhile, Dina takes Olivia to a performance of "Football: The Opera", which bores Olivia. Despite not wanting to come off as rude, she leaves during the performance. Guest stars: Brendan Sunderland as Timbuk, Laara Sadiq as Orb Absent: Maxwell Acee Donovan as Wesley
10	10	"Sky's First Youth Overnight Sleeping Event"	Leslie Kolins Small	Veronica Rodriguez	January 10, 2020	109	0.66
Gabby invites Sky over to her house for a sleepover. While shopping for stuff for the sleepover, she is approached by Sky's father who found out about the incident that Gabby previous involved Sky in. He gives her a warning in Gabby's mindscape not to have any harm come to Sky or there will be grave consequences that involves him wiping her memory of Sky from Gabby's mind. To evade his wrath, Gabby works to keep Sky from being harmed until they are tempted to sneak out to take selfies. Meanwhile, Principal Swift is teaching Jeremy how to be a leader by having him command a multiplying alien called a Blurble. When things gets out of hand, Jeremy manages to get the Blurbles back in line before the Orb can destroy them. At the same time, Dina and Olivia have their own sleepover in matching pajamas. After Gabby and Sky evade a security guard at one of the places where they took their selfies, they return home where Olivia, Dina (who is in a different pair of pajamas after throwing up on the other ones), and Sky's dad are waiting for them. Both of them are grounded for sneaking out. When Gabby takes Sky and Sky's dad into her mindscape to talk Sky's dad out of doing a mind-wipe, Sky's dad is convinced and allows his daughter to remain friends with Gabby with the grounding still standing. When in her room, Gabby enjoys looking at the selfies that she and Sky took. Guest stars: Elle McKinnon as Sky, Laara Sadiq as Orb Absent: Maxwell Acee Donovan as Wesley
11	11	"Wesley Jr."	Jon Rosenbaum	Mike Alber & Gabe Snyder	January 17, 2020	110	0.46
When an alien egg hatches, Wesley becomes attached and names the creature after himself. When Principal Swift interrogates Wesley about his journals, the Va'taxian Vibra-Bird starts shaking uncontrollably. The alien "quakes" when it senses negative emotions. In Principal Swift's office, both Gabby and Wesley are reprimanded for their actions and he tells them not to reveal the aliens on Earth information to anyone else. When Gabby and Wesley go to their lockers, Gabby finds a large envelope in her locker with a message in it saying "I know your secret". Absent: Callan Farris as Jeremy
12	12	"The Note"	Jon Rosenbaum	Adam Aseraf & Hunter Cope	January 24, 2020	111	0.49
Gabby and Wesley work to find the person who has been sending the note and its follow-ups demanding she give up babysitting aliens. After Gabby's unseen visits to her alien clients to see if it's a prank, she and Wesley look for possible human suspects. Meanwhile, Principal Swift wants to spend time with Jeremy, so he tells him a long list of his secrets, which stresses Jeremy and causes him to grow a mustache. After Jace and Susie Dustman each denied any knowledge of sending the letters to her, Gabby is called home by Dina who found another note at their house and has her confined to her to her room awaiting a confession. Upon getting a call from Wesley, Gabby enlists Jeremy to pose as her to fool Dina. The duo manages to find a lead at the library, where the librarian Mrs. Choi recognizes the letters of the note from some magazines that had their letters cut out. Gabby and Wesley pursue a hooded figure and discover that it was Olivia who wrote the notes. She overheard about Gabby's job and she considers aliens dangerous. As Wesley pays for the magazine damages that Olivia did, Gabby makes Olivia acquainted with Jeremy as Olivia covers up the letter thing to Dina. Guest stars: Ricardo Ortiz as Jace, Bracken Hanke as Susie
13	13	"Gabby Duran: Genius"	Joe Nussbaum	Linda Mathious & Heather MacGillvray	January 31, 2020	113	0.54
When a sick Jeremy accidentally sneezes into Gabby's mouth, his phlegm alters Gabby's brain chemistry, turning her into a genius. Olivia urges her to use her newfound intelligence for good but at first, Gabby uses it to cheat and win prizes. The next day at school, Susie challenges Gabby to a math smackdown. The loser must eat Howard's locker hoagie. However, Gabby loses her intelligence soon after. She tries to get Jeremy to sneeze on her again but it's too late since Swift and the Orb have already found a cure for Jeremy's virus. Olivia helps Gabby study as much as she can in one day. During the math smackdown, Gabby gets all the answers wrong except one, undermining Susie's perfect record. Guest stars: Bracken Hanke as Susie, Laara Sadiq as Orb Absent: Maxwell Acee Donovan as Wesley
14	14	"Who Is Joey Panther?"	Leslie Kolins Small	Lacey Dyer & Julia Layton	February 7, 2020	114	0.58
Gabby has high hopes for her first middle school dance, but things go south when Wesley's weird friend Rhonda tags along as part of an agreement that was made years ago. Gabby meets a cool kid named Joey Panther who becomes her prom date. She discovers that Joey Panther is actually an android that is being controlled by a small alien named Fritz, who Gabby previously babysat. Although she can't attend the dance because of her telepathic abilities, Sky ends up going anyway and works to keep her distance. Guest stars: Elle McKinnon as Sky, Hunter Dillon as Joey Panther Absent: Callan Farris as Jeremy, Coco Christo as Olivia, Valery Ortiz as Dina, Nathan Lovejoy as Principal Swift
15	15	"Fake News"	Leslie Kolins Small	Mike Alber & Gabe Snyder	February 21, 2020	115	0.43
Gabby and Olivia overhear their mother talking to their grandmother about plans to move the family back to Miami due to a lack of interesting news in Havensburg. To make Havensburg interesting, Gabby and Olivia enlist Jeremy, Sky, Kali, and a Vitrious Primian named Louis to do cause strange things to happen around Havensburg. Meanwhile, Wesley wants to gain a position to help Principal Swift who has him clean out a supposed dangerous alien mold in his storage unit. Guest stars: Elle McKinnon as Sky, Mia Bella as Kali, Laara Sadiq as Orb
16	16	"Vortex & Night Train"	Nimisha Mukerji	Eugene Garcia-Cross	February 28, 2020	116	0.48
Upon tripping over "Bagly Cooper", Wesley accidentally kisses Gabby which makes them feel awkward as Wesley claims that the kiss is a "best friend killer". Jeremy uses some mind-wiping technology from some "friends" of his which goes awry where it erases the next four hours instead of the last four hours. As they work to recollect what happened, Gabby and Wesley must find the mind-wiping device when the male and female Blorg that Jeremy is "friends" with demand their device be returned to them. Meanwhile, Dina gets exposed to some shedded particles from one Gabby's latest clients which turns her head and neck green as Olivia works to find a way to undo it. Guest star: Laara Sadiq as Orb Absent: Nathan Lovejoy as Principal Swift
17	17	"Tailoring Swift"	Leslie Kolins Small	Lacey Dyer & Julia Layton	March 6, 2020	117	0.54
Principal Swift gives Gabby a warning about her reckless behavior following a minor property damage while she was babysitting Kali. Her next babysitting assignment is watching Daria Mungo, whose kind are the finest tailors in the universe. When Gabby stumbles into a room and gets caught by Mrs. Mungo, Swift believes their lie that Gabby caused trouble for them and warns Gabby that there will be consequences if she messes up again. With Wesley providing a diversion, Gabby goes to find out what the Mungos are up to and gets caught. This causes Swift to suspend her from babysitting. Meanwhile, Olivia is planning to throw out her old toy Tattery Tom until Jeremy asks if he can have it. When Jeremy works on it, it causes trouble for him and Olivia who get knocked out. When they come to, the Orb states that she took care of Tattery Tom. Upon getting the secret plans, Gabby and the Orb discover that the Mungos plan to make a suit out of Swift's Gor-Mon form as he discovers that Gabby was right about them. Gabby is able to rescue Swift. Swift has the Mungos placed under alien citizen's arrest as he apologizes to Gabby for not believing her. As for the Orb, she secretly has Tattery Tom in her storage area. Guest stars: Loretta Walsh as Mrs. Mungo, Geoff Gustafson as Mr. Mungo, Mia Bella as Kali, Laara Sadiq as Orb Absent: Valery Ortiz as Dina
18	18	"Warm, Thick, and Saucy"	Siobhan Devine	Ross Zimmerman	March 13, 2020	118	0.41
Luchachos is having its 25th anniversary. While helping in the preparation for the party, Gabby is left watching an Inviso-Lizard for a client. The pet gets loose and Gabby and Wesley try to catch it which causes a mess and causing them to be banned for life. Meanwhile, Principal Swift goes through a clense and Jeremy loses the DNA for Swift's hair. Jeremy gets a hair sample from a man named Bodean Jones. Finding out that the Inviso-Lizard laid eggs in the carnitas, Gabby and Wesley sneak back in to get the eggs and get caught. Gabby manages to get the final egg out of the sauce and throws up after eating it. Moments later, the ban is lifted as they are told by the manager that the sauce had opossum meat in it which is a health violation. Gabby and Wesley leave Luchachos and they leave a tip for Julius to take, something they have never done before. Guest star: Nathan Lovejoy as Bodean Jones Absent: Coco Christo as Olivia, Valery Ortiz as Dina
19	19	"Enter the Dranis"	Joe Nussbaum	Veronica Rodriguez and Mike Alber & Gabe Snyder	March 20, 2020	119−120 (199)	0.50
Gabby is invited to babysit a client's child on the vacation planet Paradi-Zon. Principal Swift advises her not to accept as he never heard of Paradi-Zon. Gabby does anyway as Wesley packs her some necessities. Meanwhile, Principal Swift is contacted by Glor-Bron to check in on Jeremy's lessons for the Supreme Leader. While on her way, Gabby finds herself not on Paradi-Zon. Instead, she is on Gor-Monia where she is captured by Jeremy's sister Dranis. She has Gabby thrown in prison and plans to blow up Havensburg when Jeremy comes to rescue her. Principal Swift hears that Gabby took the invitation and goes with Jeremy to bring her back to Earth. As for the video Swift was making, it is no longer required when it turns out that Glor-Bron was actually assigned to be Dranis' babysitter. While tracking Olivia, Dina ends up in Swift's basement and overhears Swift saying that they are aliens. Guest stars: Kimia Esfahani as Dranis, Alex Rose as Glor-Bron, Jason Simpson as Supreme Leader, Laara Sadiq as Orb

=== Season 2 (2021) ===
No. overall	No. in season	Title	Directed by	Written by	Original release date	Prod. code	U.S. viewers (millions)
20	1	"Mom Wipe"	Joe Nussbaum	Mike Alber & Gabe Snyder	June 4, 2021	201	0.32
After finding Gabby and Olivia in Principal Swift's basement and learning that Swift and Jeremy are aliens, Dina wants to call the police. Gabby tries to reason with her but Dina thinks that the aliens have brainwashed her. Swift freezes Dina while they figure out a safe way to erase her memory. They ask Sky to use her telepathic powers but she needs a special focusing cream, which she gets with Gabby and Wesley's help. Using her powers, Sky sends Gabby into Dina's brain to erase the memory about aliens. Gabby learns that her mother just wanted to protect them. The memory wipe succeeds. Meanwhile, Jeremy goes to school to stand in for Principal Swift. He introduces himself as a new cool student who doesn't follow rules. Susie becomes suspicious but when she reports Jeremy to himself disguised as Principal Swift, he suspends her from school. He is confronted by the school superintendent for his reckless behavior. Guest star: Elle McKinnon as Sky
21	2	"Gabby's Big Break"	Joe Nussbaum	Hunter Cope & Adam Aseraf	June 11, 2021	202	0.22
Gabby has been so exhausted from her job that she falls asleep while babysitting her Sazmorian client Rooney. Principal Swift orders her to take a break, but Gabby doesn't want to. Wesley advises her to relax and find another hobby to add balance in her life. After finding out that Wesley is substituting for her in babysitting Rooney, Gabby defies Swift's orders and goes to join them. Unfortunately, she accidentally hits Rooney with the door, causing his portal blaster to teleport him and Wesley to another dimension. To rescue them, Gabby and Swift must peddle Rooney's old portal blaster machine to reopen the portal. After the incident, Gabby agrees to take a two-day break. Meanwhile, when Jeremy claims that his Blurble creature is faster than Olivia's gerbil, Olivia challenges him to a pet race on an obstacle course. While they exchange insults before the competition, their pets fall in love and escape to get married.
22	3	"The Vibe"	Jon Rosenbaum	Veronica Rodriguez	June 18, 2021	203	0.21
When Wesley and Sky start dating, Gabby becomes worried that their friendship vibe will be ruined. She invites them for a movie night but it ends in awkwardness. To restore the friendship vibe, Gabby takes them to a cabin, but on the way, Wesley decides to break up with Sky to end the awkwardness. Sky gives him a note and asks him to run before she turns into a monster since her alien race is highly sensitive to emotions. Wesley helps get Sky back to normal by saying some of their inside jokes. Gabby realizes that she needs to learn to adjust to her best friends dating. Meanwhile, Olivia is hosting a tea party for a group of snooty girls called the Little Miss High Tea Society. Dina ruins the tea party because she keeps acting weird ever since Gabby went into her brain to erase her memory of aliens. One of the girls hits Dina on the head which seemingly fixes her. Guest star: Elle McKinnon as Sky
23	4	"Ratita and the Ultras"	Jon Rosenbaum	Ben Glass	June 25, 2021	204	0.27
In order to afford a pair of sneakers called the Ultras, Gabby sells a marionette puppet rat named Ratita to an alien who collects human junk. However, she later learns that Ratita is an important family heirloom and is forced to get her back. She finds that Ratita has been bought by an alien race that worships her as their god. She steals Ratita, but the aliens chase after her. In exchange for Ratita, the aliens take the Ultras sneakers and eat them. Meanwhile, Principal Swift, Jeremy and Wesley are puzzled by a cootie catcher, believing that it has power over them. They try to do everything the paper fortune teller asks them to do until they cannot take it anymore. They ask the little girl who created it to help them get rid of it but they end up freaking her out. They eventually float the cootie catcher on a tiny boat and set it on fire.
24	5	"Mimi from Miami"	Leslie Kolins Small and Joe Nussbaum	Danya Jimenez & Hannah McMechan	July 2, 2021	205	0.24
Gabby is excited to spend her first birthday in Havensburg because, back in Miami, she was always forced to share her birthday party with Mimi, her overly competitive friend. Unfortunately, Dina and Olivia invite Mimi over as their birthday gift to Gabby. This creates tension between Gabby and Mimi as they try to one-up each other during all their birthday activities. Things get out of hand when they start competing over who should cut the cake. Mimi runs away with the cake and Gabby chases her down the street. They start fighting, causing the cake to explode in their faces. Gabby and Mimi admit that even though they love each other, they do not like sharing birthday parties. Meanwhile, after receiving a birthday invite from Gabby asking them to R.S.V.P., Principal Swift and Jeremy spend the whole day trying to figure out what R.S.V.P. means.
25	6	"The Mile"	Nimisha Mukerji	Mike Alber & Gabe Snyder	July 9, 2021	207	0.29
Gabby has been taking advantage of her friendship with Principal Swift to get away with breaking school rules and avoiding gym class. When Swift refuses to let Gabby miss a gym test which includes a mile run, she enlists Fritz to build an android that looks like her to do the gym test on her behalf. Unfortunately, Jace spills water on the bot, causing it to malfunction and attack Swift. Gabby is forced to run over a mile to school to save Swift from the bot. Meanwhile, Olivia asks Jeremy for help conquering stage fright since Dina wants her to participate in a Geography spelling bee. Jeremy trains her using holograms but it doesn't work. Olivia decides to become a fearless character named Barbara from Brisbane whom she created when she was five. When Olivia transforms into Barbara on stage and attacks the moderator, she is disqualified from the contest. Guest star: Ricardo Ortiz as Jace
26	7	"Dude, Where's My House?"	Nimisha Mukerji	Annie Nishida	July 16, 2021	208	0.32
Principal Swift asks Gabby to babysit Jeremy overnight while he attends an UNCLE convention. Gabby abandons Jeremy to buy bucket hats from a 90's pop up shop but upon returning, she finds the house missing. Jeremy tells her that the house was shrunk and taken by the Alstablocian Jimbuk. They go to Jimbuk's house to get the house back but Gabby finds out that it was Jeremy's plan because he wanted to spend time with Gabby. After accidentally destroying the house, Gabby and Jeremy work fast to put it together and restore it to its original size before Swift returns. Meanwhile, when Sky invites Wesley to meet her father, Sky's father puts him in a dinner simulation where everything goes horribly wrong. In the simulation, Wesley destroys their toilet, forcing Sky's father to challenge him to a mind duel. Wesley figures out that it is a simulation because Sky is not acting as herself. This convinces Sky's father that Wesley knows Sky very well and loves her. Guest star: Elle McKinnon as Sky Absent: Coco Christo as Olivia, Valery Ortiz as Dina
27	8	"A Song of Gabby & Susie"	Veronica Rodriguez	Paige Pearl	July 30, 2021	209	0.26
Both Gabby and Susie need a partner for a best friends' contest to meet Amelia Barsten, the author of their favorite book series, Best Fins Forever. Unable to find anyone else who shares the same passion, Gabby and Susie agree to team up. They grow close while working together but their relationship is ruined when Susie discovers old texts between Gabby and Wesley about her. This reignites their rivalry which continues during their meeting with Amelia. After getting a sneak peek of the upcoming book, they are disappointed that the hero kills her rival, Lobstrina. As Gabby defends Lobstrina, Susie realizes that is how Gabby feels about her. Later at school, Gabby and Susie pretend to not like each other but they end up bonding over their adventure. Meanwhile, with the Orb offline for maintenance, Swift and Jeremy buy another assistant called the Bro. After winning them over with its charm, the Bro decides to obliterate the Orb. Swift and Jeremy agree with it but the Bro decides to destroy them as well for refusing to accept beef as their only source of proteins. The Orb saves them. Guest star: Bracken Hanke as Susie Absent: Coco Christo as Olivia, Valery Ortiz as Dina
28	9	"The Bubble"	Veronica Rodriguez	Sheela Shrinivas	August 6, 2021	210	0.25
When Dina drives Gabby to school in an environmentally-unfriendly car on a Fume-Free Friday, Wesley calls Gabby out for living in a bubble without environmental awareness. He sends her a link to learn about world issues. Overwhelmed by all the bad things happening around the world, Gabby assembles a team to help fix the world. Olivia suggests starting small by helping the elderly but Gabby wants to go big. Jeremy uses a super vacuum to suck trash while Kali chooses to destroy environmentally-unfriendly cars like Dina's. Rooney builds a machine to clone bees but in an attempt to speed up the process, Gabby causes the machine to explode, releasing a swarm of electric bees in town. As Gabby leads her team to stop the bees, she realizes that she cannot solve everything at once. Meanwhile, Principal Swift asks Dina to teach him how to ride a bicycle. To understand bicycles better, Swift transforms into one and Dina unknowingly rides it.
29	10	"GOAT of the Month"	Jon Rosenbaum	Lacey Dyer & Julia Layton	August 6, 2021	211	0.21
Gabby and Wesley have been trying to win the Greatest of All Time (GOAT) of the Month award for months without luck. When Susie invites them for an open-mic charity event where they could be discovered by the GOAT committee, they want to do a duet but Gabby is disappointed that Wesley cannot sing. She vents to her new babysitting client, Astra, who makes her a potion to give Wesley a singing voice like hers. Unfortunately, the potion swaps their singing voices. Wesley is upset to learn that Gabby is embarrassed by his voice. To save their friendship, Gabby performs a song for Wesley in his voice, but when the crowd starts booing her, Wesley joins her onstage. Meanwhile, Swift tries to help Jeremy to stop blobbing out when angry. To prove that Swift blobs out when angry as well, Jeremy invites Swift's nemesis Glor-Bron to infuriate him. On discovering that both Swift and Jeremy blob out when angry, Glor-Bron volunteers to stay against their will until he fixes them. Guest stars: Bracken Hanke as Susie, Alex Rose as Glor-Bron, Naomi Tan as Astra Absent: Coco Christo as Olivia, Valery Ortiz as Dina
30	11	"Welcome to the Club"	Nimisha Mukerji	David Ramirez	September 17, 2021	217	0.22
During cultural heritage night at school, Gabby decides to join the Latino club, only to find that she knows little about her own culture. After learning more about the cultures of the members of her club, Gabby starts to fit in more. However, on the night of the heritage party, things go awry when the club members find out what she did. After having a talk with Dina, Gabby realizes that she shouldn't let others judge her on having a culture on her level. After apologizing to the club owner for breaking his hands, Gabby rejoins the Latino club. Meanwhile, during his anniversary with Sky, Wesley gets her a candle wax made from different itmes of New York. However, he starts to worry that his gift wouldn't be much after Sky gifted him with a date on a Martian island. With Jeremy's help, Wesley instead gets her a plant that gets people to fall in love with it just by smelling it. This causes Sky to break up with him. Sky's father tries to help his daughter get back to her senses, but ends up falling for the plant as well. Wesley saves them both by having them light his candle, causing the plant's hypnosis to wear off. Sky then admits that she loved the candle after all. Guest stars: Elle McKinnon as Sky, Ricardo Ortiz as Jace, Andrew Alvarez as Santi Absent: Coco Christo as Olivia, Nathan Lovejoy as Principal Swift
31	12	"Dinas and Dougs"	Jon Rosenbaum	Michael J.S. Murphy	September 17, 2021	212	0.20
Dina introduces Gabby and Olivia to her new boyfriend Doug. The two are reluctant into letting their mom date again, due to how she was hurt on previous dates. The next day, they go to Doug's house to learn that he is an alien named Doug Prime and that he cloned himself into four different versions of himself. After a failed attempt into convincing Dina to break up with Doug, Gabby and Olivia return to his house to find that the clones have made clones of Dina for each of them. Soon after, Dina arrives at the house and ends her relationship with Doug for the sake of her daughters. Realizing their mistake, Gabby and Olivia agree to get Doug back with Dina on the conditions that he would never tell her he's an alien nor will he try to take his fake ears off in front of her. Doug reconciles with Dina, where Gabby and Olivia apologizes to her for trying to break them up. The two then say goodbye to the Dina and Doug clones, as they head back to their home planet, knowing their mom will be enough to keep their Prime leader happy. Meanwhile, Wesley and Jeremy audition for their favorite show Tame the Wild. However, after Jeremy gets the password wrong several times, he ends up locking up himself and Wesley in the basement. Thinking it's like Tame the Wild, they try their best to survive, however things soon go awry when they run out of food. They attempt to eat Jeremy's pet blurble that was also locked up with them. It grows into a giant beast that almost swallows Jeremy whole. Just when it was about to eat Wesley, the lockdown gets lifted, and Swift comes back from his two-day bath. When he sees the mess the boys made, he finds out what they were doing and punishes them by adjusting the parental controls. Guest star: Doron Bell as Doug
32	13	"Beware the Fright Master!"	Joe Nussbaum and Leslie Kolins Small	Dimitry Pompée	October 8, 2021	206	0.13
Guest star: Ricardo Ortiz as Jace
33	14	"Zeke to the Future"	Bridget Stokes	Adam Aseraf & Hunter Cope	October 15, 2021	213	0.16
After getting an F on her history project, Gabby is forced to take on the task of learning more about Havensburg's history. While at the museum, she meets Zeke, the son of the founders of Havensburg from the year 1821. Zeke explains to her and Wesley that he once met an alien named Tarley and that he built a freezer of which he came from 200 years back. Wanting to send Zeke back to his time, Gabby has Rooney build a time machine, which she is able to do with Wesley's help. However, thinking the present is way better than 1821, Zeke refuses to return and pushes Gabby into the time machine. Fortunately, Gabby manages to stop Zeke from coming into the future by taking a picture of him, creeping him out. She then uses the freezer to return to the present. The next day, Gabby becomes more into learning the history of Havensburg and receives a C on her project. Meanwhile, Olivia becomes stressed over her studies that consist of karate, violin, and German lessons. She tries to go with Jeremy's suggestion into relaxing in a pile of trash, but this only backfires. In the end, Principal Swift manages to convince Olivia to talk to Dina about her problem.
34	15	"Adventures in Alien House-Sitting"	Bridget Stokes	Lacey Dyer & Julia Layton	October 22, 2021	214	0.15
Absent: Coco Christo as Olivia, Valery Ortiz as Dina
35	16	"Fountain of Ruth"	Siobhan Devine	Joshua Krilov	October 29, 2021	215	0.20
Gabby and Olivia are excited to spend the weekend with their paternal grandmother Ruth, who is known to be adventurous and extreme, while Dina attends concerts of her favorite boyband. However, after a skiing accident, Grandma Ruth injures her back, much to the girls' disappointment. Wanting her to have her spirit back, Gabby gives Grandma Ruth an energy drink that was given to her by Kali. Ruth then takes the girls out on a fun day. However, things go completely awry later on, when she drinks the whole pack of the energy drinks, turning her into a warlord. Kali explains that in order to return Ruth back to normal, Gabby will have to fight her until the effect of the energy drinks wear off. Gabby manages to fight off Ruth, until the next afternoon with Olivia's help, finally returning her back to normal. They then end the weekend with a fun board game, until Dina comes home and sees the mess Ruth made in the living room. Meanwhile, wanting to understand grandparents better, Jeremy and Principal Swift asks Wesley to pretend to be their grandfather for a day. When he agrees, they give Wesley an aging drink, turning him into an elder. They eventually come to understand the meaning of having grandparents, just as the aging drink wears off of Wesley.
36	17	"Extreme Ruckus"	Siobhan Devine	Veronica Rodriguez	November 5, 2021	216	0.14
Gabby's Stay Fresh Refresh weekend is interrupted when Principal Swift sends Jeremy and his best friend Ziggy over to her house. Whenever the two are together, things are known into become very chaotic, to the point that Gabby loses her temper and kicks them out, much to Jeremy and Ziggy's disappointment. However, after Jeremy's body explodes from a dare, Gabby ends up getting his parts back by having him and Ziggy create ruckus in the owner's store, until he gives in. Later on, Jeremy and Ziggy become worn-out and decide to enjoy the Stay Fresh Refresh weekend with Gabby. Meanwhile, Wesley hires Olivia as his assistant into cleaning up after messes that are both normal and supernatural. However, during one of his cleaning duties in the basement, he gets called to an alien counsel group who are known to be planet destroyers. They give Wesley two hours prove why Earth shouldn't be destroyed. He tries explaining the situation to Olivia and Principal Swift, but they don't believe him. He later on manages to spare Earth by fixing the squeaky chair one of the counsel members were sitting on. By then, Olivia decides to quit being Wesley's assistant, just when she meets one of the Counsel members and realizes that Wesley was telling the truth the whole time. Absent: Valery Ortiz as Dina
37	18	"Shoe-Dun-It"	Nimisha Mukerji	Ben Glass	November 12, 2021	218	0.25
Gabby becomes upset when she finds out that somebody destroyed her special sneakers that she kept in a vault in Swift's basement. She suspects that it was one of her friends, but they all claim that they were all doing other things. Later on, when Wesley went to go use the bathroom, Glor-Bron ties him up and shape-shifs into him. When the others find out however, Glor-Bron reveals that he lost his job in Glormonia and that ever since he arrived on Earth, he has been scouring around for food and that he didn't go into the vault. When Gabby finds a speck of dust as evidence, she finds out that the other things her friends were doing are fake and that all of them destroyed the sneakers. Principal Swift then confirms the truth; they all accidentally made marks on the sneakers and made it seem as if they were all innocent, and that they only did that because they thought Gabby would be so mad at them it would ruin their friendship. Jeremy, Wesley, and Olivia states that it's true, and they all apologize for what they've done, as well as not telling her the truth from the start. Gabby forgives them and says she has a backup pair, much to the others' fear. Guest star: Alex Rose as Glor-Bron Absent: Valery Ortiz as Dina
38	19	"Magic Hours"	Robbie Countryman	Hunter Cope & Adam Aseraf	November 19, 2021	219	0.20
Gabby and Wesley are paired to do their end-of-the-year history project, where Susie warns them that if they fail, they'll have to attend summer school. After spending the entire month doing other things, Gabby and Wesley managed to complete their project within two hours with Wesley's old computer. However, after it gets soaked in water, they take it to an alien shop, only for the owner to get kidnapped just when he managed to get the hard-drive out. In despair, Gabby and Wesley are ready to give up, only for their history teacher to reveal that he received their project the next morning. It turns out that the shop owner managed to escape from the kidnappers, fix Wesley's computer, and turn in their project within the remaining time they had left. Meanwhile, Olivia devises a plan to capture a ferret that has been eating her zucchini garden and enlists help from Principal Swift. After a crazy turn of events that happened throughout the night, they fail to catch it, but admit that they did end up bonding over the time they shared together. Guest star: Bracken Hanke as Susie Absent: Callan Farris as Jeremy
39	20	"The Fault in Our Star Night"	Joe Nussbaum	Lacey Dyer & Julia Layton and Mike Alber & Gabe Snyder	November 26, 2021	220 (299)	0.27
Gabby meets the new boy named Leo, who invites her to Star Night at the exact same time she has a babysitting assignment. At the exact same time, Sky and Wesley are planning to have their first kiss, so Sky can know more about Wesley, while assuring him that nothing can change what's in between them. Also, Jeremy wants to attend human school, so Principal Swift sets up a test, to which he proves he's mature enough. Gabby ends up inviting Leo to her client's house, where she learns that the client was actually created by a universal council group. Thinking Gabby is a threat to the aliens in Havensburg, they reboot her as well as her entire lifestyle. By then, it has been seen that within those two years, Gabby has become a troublemaker to her school, as well as to Olivia and Dina, where the latter threatens to send Gabby back to Miami to live with her father. It is also revealed that Wesley joined the football team and is dating Susie. After getting shocked by an electrical pole, Gabby regains some of the memories she had with Wesley. During her conversation with him, Gabby also manages to regain memories of Swift. It is then shown that after losing his job and Jeremy to Glor-Bron, Swift now works at Luchachos. Just as he agrees to help her out, Dina has had it and decides to send Gabby back to Miami. This causes Gabby to remember everything that happened before the rebooting. With Olivia and Wesley's help, Gabby exposes Swift's Gormonite form to the audience during Star Night, alerting the universal council. Gabby then reveals that because of their predictions and what they've done, things are way worse than how it's actually been and manages to convince them to return things back to normal. By then, Swift prepares Jeremy for his first day of school, Wesley and Sky kiss, and the actual client Gabby was supposed to babysit canceled at the last minute, giving her the chance to go to Star Night with Leo. However, a missed phone call from Leo's mother reveals that there might be more to him than what meets the eye. Guest stars: Vincent Muller as Leo, Heather Doerksen as D.U.M.B. Leader, Elle McKinnon as Sky, Naomi Tan as Astra, Bracken Hanke as Susie, Alex Rose as Glor-Bron, Zibby Allen as Kipper

== Shorts ==
=== Babysitting 101 (2020) ===
These shorts focus on Gabby teaching future babysitters what she has learned from babysitting aliens.

No.	Title	Online release date
1	"How to Bathe Your Alien"	March 7, 2020
2	"How to Put Your Alien to Sleep"	March 14, 2020
3	"How to Feed Your Alien"	March 21, 2020
4	"How to Entertain Your Alien"	March 28, 2020

== Ratings ==
Viewership and ratings per season of Gabby Duran & the Unsittables
Season	Episodes	First aired		Last aired		Avg. viewers (millions)
Season	Episodes	Date	Viewers (millions)	Date	Viewers (millions)	Avg. viewers (millions)
1	19	October 11, 2019	0.57	March 20, 2020	0.50	0.48
2	20	June 4, 2021	0.32	November 26, 2021	0.27	0.22
