= Carolina Theatre (Durham) =

Theater in North Carolina, United States

Coordinates: 35.99813°N 78.90174°W

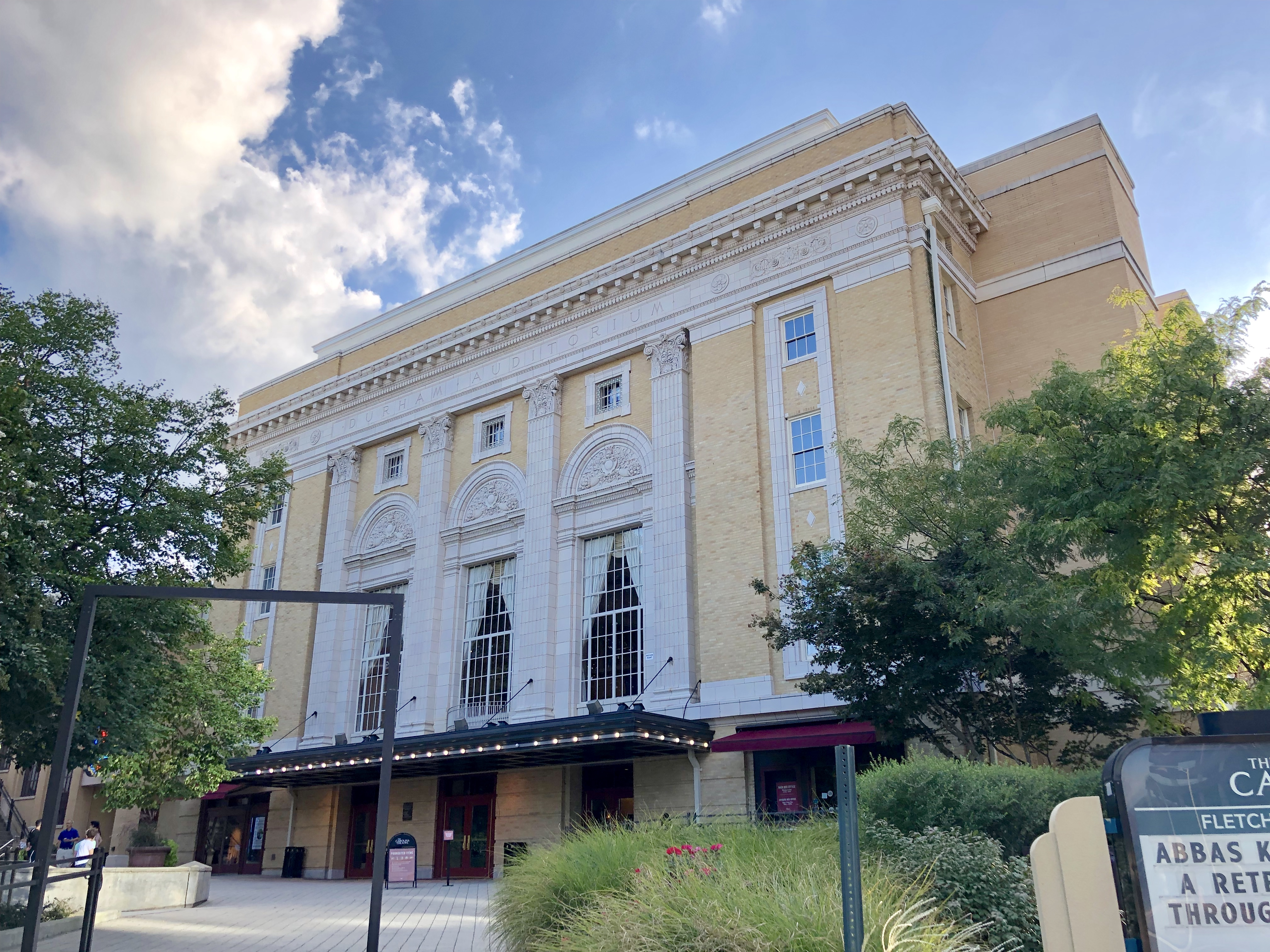
- The Carolina Theatre in 2019
- Interactive map of Carolina Theatre
- Former names: Durham Auditorium (1926-29)
- Address: 309 W Morgan St; Durham, NC 27701-2119
- Location: Central Park
- Owner: City of Durham
- Operator: Carolina Theatre of Durham, Inc.
- Capacity: 1,048 (Fletcher Hall); 226 (Cinema One); 49 (Cinema Two)

Construction
- Groundbreaking: May 1, 1925
- Opened: February 2, 1926
- Renovated: 1929, 1988–1994
- Cost: $250,000 ($4.59 million in 2025 dollars)
- Architect: Milburn, Heister & Company

Website
- www.carolinatheatre.org

The Carolina Theatre is a performing arts and cinema complex in downtown Durham, North Carolina. The facility is operated by a nonprofit organization named The Carolina Theatre of Durham, Inc. under a management agreement with the City of Durham, which owns the complex.

== History ==
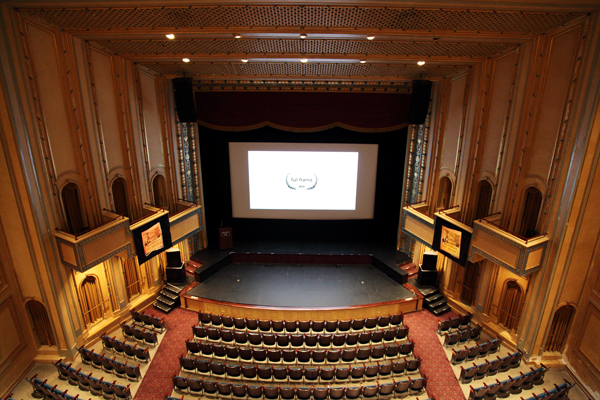
The main stage, Fletcher Hall

In 1923, the city of Durham chose to construct an auditorium on a lot adjacent to Morris Street School. Bids for construction were accepted on May 1, 1925 and the $250,000 budget was set. The building was completed in 1926 and opened on February 2 of that year with the Kiwanis Jollies. The theater's popularity rose during the World War II years and soldiers from Camp Butner were moved to the theater to watch movies. In 1977, the North Carolina Department of Archives and History completed a historic survey of Downtown Durham and recognized The Carolina Theatre as a "significant building in the city" and the center portion of downtown was placed on the National Register of Historic Places.

The Carolina Theatre remains the last of thirteen original theaters in the city. The most recent renovation of the theater was in 2011, which included plaster repairs, new carpeting, painting, and sound upgrades in Fletcher Hall and the Cinemas.

== Design ==
The Carolina Theatre was designed in the Beaux-Arts style by the Washington, D.C. architectural firm of Milburn, Heister & Company. This facility is not to be confused with the Carolina Theatre of Chapel Hill, which announced its closing in 2005.

== Theaters ==
The main stage, called Fletcher Hall, seats 1,048 and has two balconies. The cinema wing, built in 1992, seats 226 in Cinema 1 and 49 in Cinema 2. The theater includes two elegant function rooms, the Connie Moses Ballroom, which is known for its chandeliers and large windows overlooking the plaza in front of the theater; and the Donor Lounge, located outside the theater's second balcony.

== Programming ==
Carolina Theatre of Durham, Inc. is the 5th-largest performing arts organization in the Research Triangle region of North Carolina, which encompasses Raleigh, Durham, and Chapel Hill. The nonprofit presents nearly 100 concerts and comedy performances per year, more than any major venue in the market, and has been among the smallest venues ranked in Pollstar's Top 100 theatres worldwide since 2012. The theater shows more than 3,000 film screenings annually. It is the producer of the North Carolina Gay and Lesbian Film Festival, one of the largest LGBT film festivals in the Southeastern United States, as well as the Nevermore Film Festival.

== Rental events ==
The Carolina Theatre hosts numerous arts nonprofits from Durham and the Triangle Region. The Full Frame Documentary Film Festival occupies the theater for four days each April. The Durham Savoyards present a multi-day run of a Gilbert and Sullivan opera each March. Chamber Orchestra of the Triangle, the Mallarme Chamber Players, Durham Symphony, and Triangle Youth Ballet are among the other arts organizations that have a history of performances at the Carolina Theatre.

== Civil rights history ==
In 2014, an exhibit commemorating the Carolina Theatre's role in desegregation in Durham was unveiled to the public. The Carolina Theatre was the first theater in Durham to admit African-Americans, although there were still segregated ticket lines and lounge areas until the summer of 1963. The theatre's civil rights history was further documented in Breaking the Booth (2026), a short documentary directed by JD Jones that chronicles the 1963 round robin protests that led to the desegregation of the Carolina Theatre. The film premiered at the theatre on January 19, 2026, during the Carolina Theatre's centennial year.
