= Last Ferry (film) =

- Directed by: Jaki Bradley
- Written by: Ramon O. Torres
- Produced by: Ramon O. Torres; Michael D. Karp; Nadia Zoe; Matthew Silverman
- Cinematography: Alexa Wolf
- Music by: Wonderly
- Production company: Emblematic Pictures
- Release date: March 23, 2019 (BFI Flare London LGBTQ+ Film Festival)
- Running time: 86 minutes
- Country: United States
- Language: English

Last Ferry is a 2019 mystery film. It is set on Fire Island and follows the story of a gay attorney who is drugged and robbed while visiting the island and tries to return home after witnessing a murder. It received a Jury Award for Best US Feature at the 2019 NCGLFF.

== Plot ==
The screenplay was inspired in part by the 2016 horror film The Wailing and the 2013 gay mystery Stranger by the Lake. The story centers around a young lawyer from Manhattan named Joseph who takes a trip to Fire Island in search of the island's infamous parties and events He finds the island is in its off-season without the aforementioned events or visitors. He meets a stranger who winds up drugging and robbing him. While partially unconscious, Joseph witnesses a murder and narrowly escapes being killed himself. He wakes up in the care of a local named Cameron whom he later develops feelings for, momentarily forgetting about the murder while the murderer reemerges among Cameron's friends.

== Cast ==
- Ramon O. Torres as Joseph
- Myles Clohessy as Rafael
- Sheldon Best as Cameron
- Gabriel Sloyer as Dr. Anabi
- R. Ward Duffy as Richard

== Reception ==
Last Ferry has screened at numerous film festivals. It was an official selection at Frameline 43, as well as BFI Flare: London LGBT Film Festival, NCGLFF, and TLVFest. It also received a Jury Award for Best US Feature at the 2019 NCGLFF. As of spring 2020, the movie is available on Netflix (US).

The film received mixed reviews from critics, with many noting its failure to explore some of the deeper themes and minor storylines presented. Robert Levin at Newsday noted that the film was a cliché of its genre, stating "It's formulaic and pedestrian when it should be treading mysterious psychological depths", but also said that viewers would not feel "cheated" if they did watch the film.

Almost all reviews praised the film's cinematography and atmosphere. Dylan Andresen at Film Threat said that the film's cinematography was "top-notch, on par with anything I’ve seen recently in theaters".
