= In the Electric Mist =

2009 film by Bertrand Tavernier

- Film poster
- Directed by: Bertrand Tavernier
- Screenplay by: Jerzy Kromolowski; Mary Olson-Kromolowski
- Based on: In the Electric Mist with Confederate Dead by James Lee Burke
- Produced by: Frédéric Bourboulon; Michael Fitzgerald
- Starring: Tommy Lee Jones; John Goodman; Peter Sarsgaard; Mary Steenburgen
- Cinematography: Bruno de Keyzer
- Edited by: Thierry Derocles; Larry Madaras; Roberto Silvi
- Music by: Marco Beltrami
- Distributed by: TFM Distribution
- Release dates: 7 February 2009 (Berlinale); 15 April 2009 (France)
- Running time: 112 minutes (international version); 102 minutes (American edit)
- Countries: France; United States
- Language: English
- Budget: $17 million
- Box office: $8 million

In the Electric Mist (French: Dans la brume électrique) is a 2009 French-American mystery drama film directed by Bertrand Tavernier, and written by Jerzy Kromolowski and Mary Olson-Kromolowski based on the novel In the Electric Mist with Confederate Dead by James Lee Burke; it stars Tommy Lee Jones in the lead role of Louisiana police detective Dave Robicheaux.

The film has only been released in Europe and Asia. In the United States, it has been shown just twice, and this in author Burke's hometown of New Iberia, Louisiana. A trimmed-down version (102:00 minutes NTSC), cut by the studio, was released direct-to-DVD in the United States. A longer director's cut version (112:23 minutes) was released in the rest of the world and premiered at the 2009 Berlin International Film Festival. In 2009, the director's cut version won the Grand Prix at the first "Festival International du Film Policier de Beaune", which is the continuation of the "Festival du Film Policier de Cognac." It opened on 15 April 2009 in France to positive reviews, while reviews for the American version were mostly positive (64% on Rotten Tomatoes).

In December 2009, Tavernier released a book titled Pas à Pas dans la Brume Électrique (Step by Step into the Electric Mist), which is a day-by-day account of the shooting of this movie.

In the Electric Mist is a sequel to 1996's Heaven's Prisoners, also adapted from a Burke novel. The character of Dave Robicheaux at that time was an ex-homicide detective in the swamplands of Louisiana, and was portrayed by Alec Baldwin.

The film marked the acting debut of musician Buddy Guy as Sam "Hogman" Patin.

== Plot ==
Iberia Parish's Sheriff Detective Dave Robicheaux is investigating the murder of a young woman, and has a chance encounter with Hollywood stars Elrod Sykes and his girlfriend Kelly Drummond. They are in the small town to make a Civil War film.

Due to Elrod's erratic driving, Dave determines that the actor is driving drunk, and decides to arrest him. Objecting to being sent to jail, Elrod tells Dave of a decayed corpse that Kelly and he had found in the swamp.

Dave goes to investigate, while remembering a murder he had witnessed as a teenager, where a chained prisoner was shot in the swamp and disappeared into the bog. The discovery is soon tied to several murders in that area that had occurred recently, mostly to young runaways and prostitutes. The clues seem to point to Julie "Baby Feet" Balboni, whose ties with the mafia had caused Dave and him to drift apart and become enemies.

Balboni denies knowing the prostitute whose murder is being investigated. With little to go on, Dave visits the film site and meets the producer, Michael Goldman, who states that while Baby Feet is helping to fund the film, he is not a co-producer as he had said.

Meanwhile, Dave's home life is disrupted by Elrod and Kelly, who begin turning up regularly, almost every time with Elrod being drunk. This prompts Dave to take pity on him, as he, too, is a struggling alcoholic. His daughter, Alafair looks up to movie star Elrod, but wife Bootsie has concerns.

The discovery of a second body prompts the FBI to become involved in the case. Dave is partnered with agent Rosie Gomez. Dave attends a birthday party for Goldman, and though drinking Dr Pepper, becomes terribly uncoordinated during his drive home, and crashes his pickup truck, sending him off in a daze to the forest. There, he encounters a camp of Confederate soldiers, and their commanding officer General John Bell Hood, who apparently wishes to help Dave with his journey to solve these murders. When he awakens from his daze in a hospital, Dave learns from Gomez that his drink had been laced with LSD.

Elrod drunkenly takes a boat out on the bayou with Kelly, calling Dave when the boat engines get caught in gill nets. Dave gives Kelly his coat, as it is pouring rain, and a mysterious gunman shoots her in the chest, mistaking her for him.

General Hood offers advice again, and Dave shakes off the feelings of guilt over Kelly's death. Elrod moves in for a while so Dave can be his Alcoholics Anonymous sponsor.

Dave's cop friend, Lou Girard, is found dead, apparently by shooting himself with a shotgun.

On the last occasion that Dave sees General Hood, the general and a few of his Confederate comrades are breaking camp and preparing to leave. They are having a group photograph taken, and the general invites Dave to join them in the group.

A story from an alleged pimp corroborates a suspect, Murphy Doucet, who with his partner Twinkie Lemoyne is responsible for the murder of DeWitt Prejean, the skeleton found in the swamp. Dave arrests Doucet using a planted knife as evidence, but Doucet gets out on bail and kidnaps Dave's young daughter Alafair.

Gomez and Dave go to Baby Feet's residence and force him into telling them about a campsite Doucet owns. The two head there. Gomez is startled by Doucet and instinctively shoots him. Dave plants a throw-away pistol on the unarmed villain to ensure that she is cleared of any charges of murdering him. They free Alafair and return home.

Months later, Dave, who had stopped seeing visions of General Hood after the case was solved, determines that he was a figment of his imagination, a lingering spirit to help him through the most difficult case of his life. He moves on with his life, while Baby Feet, according to Dave, was arrested for an issue that no one would have suspected, not as a mafia criminal, but as a tax dodger. Elrod, too, moves on with his life, leaving his alcohol addiction behind; he gives Alafair a small role in the Civil War film, and claims that she had been his salvation.

As the story ends, Alafair is looking through a book on the Civil War when she comes across a photograph of General Hood and his soldiers. In a close-up of the photo, standing in the back among the Confederate soldiers, is Dave Robicheaux. It is the photo taken during what Dave had supposed was a vision.

== Cast ==
- Tommy Lee Jones as Dave Robicheaux
- John Goodman as Julie 'Baby Feet' Balboni
- Peter Sarsgaard as Elrod Sykes
- Kelly Macdonald as Kelly Drummond
- Mary Steenburgen as Bootsie Robicheaux
- Justina Machado as Rosie Gomez
- Ned Beatty as Twinky LeMoyne
- James Gammon as Ben Hebert
- Pruitt Taylor Vince as Lou Girard
- Walter Breaux as Batist
- Levon Helm as Gen. John Bell Hood
- Bernard Hocke as Murphy Doucet
- Alana Locke as Alafair Robicheaux
- Buddy Guy as Sam "Hogman" Patin
- Chukwuma Onwuchekwa as Dewitt Prejean
- John Sayles as Michael Goldman
- Tony Molina Jr. as Adonis Brown

== DVD release ==
The film was released on DVD on 3 March 2009 and sold 104,902 units, which brought in $1,905,214 in revenue.

In Denmark, Midget Entertainment released a double-DVD set that includes both versions of the film: the U.S. edit [102'] and the International director's cut [112'].

The film opened at fourth place in DVD rentals for the week of 2–8 March 2009, with a rental index of 61.21.
