= Olivia Milch =

American film and television writer and director

- Born: February 6, 1989 (age 36); Los Angeles, California, US
- Education: Yale University (BA)
- Occupations: Film and television writer and director
- Years active: 2008–present
- Parent: David Milch

Olivia Milch is an American film and television writer and director. She gained prominence as the co-writer of the 2018 heist comedy film Ocean's 8, which she collaborated on with director Gary Ross. In 2025 she co-wrote the series The Better Sister, starring Jessica Biel and Elizabeth Banks. The series premiered on May 29, 2025, on Prime Video.
