= Dave Robicheaux =

- First appearance: The Neon Rain
- Created by: James Lee Burke
- Portrayed by: Alec Baldwin; Tommy Lee Jones

In-universe information
- Gender: Male
- Occupation: Sheriff's deputy
- Spouses: Nicole Robicheaux; Annie Robicheaux; Bootsie Robicheaux; Molly Robicheaux
- Children: Alafair (adopted)
- Nationality: American

Dave Robicheaux (pronounced "ROW-bih-show") is a fictional character in a series of mystery novels by American crime writer James Lee Burke. He first appeared in The Neon Rain (1987).

== Biography ==
A former homicide detective in the New Orleans Police Department, Dave Robicheaux lives in New Iberia, Louisiana, and works as a detective for the Iberia Parish Sheriff's Office. He is a recovering alcoholic whose demons stem from his service as a U.S. Army lieutenant in the Vietnam War and his impoverished, difficult childhood in rural Louisiana. His mother abandoned the family and was later murdered, and his father died in an oil rig explosion.

He still experiences periods of major depressive disorder and nightmares, which are only exacerbated by the murder of his wife Annie Ballard, a social worker. He married a mobster's widow, Bootsie, a lupus sufferer, and adopted an El Salvadoran orphan Alafair (the namesake of Burke's own daughter), after he saves her from the wreckage of an airplane. After Bootsie's death, he marries Molly, a former nun. He was married before the book series started, to a woman named Nicole.

His best friend—described as a violent, alcoholic ex-police officer, private investigator, and bail bondsman—is Cletus Purcel.

Robicheaux is 54 years old according to the introduction to the Recorded Books CD edition of Black Cherry Blues (the third book in the series, published in 1989), but on the third track of the audiobook, Robicheaux describes himself as being 49 years old.

== Novels ==
1. The Neon Rain (1987)
2. Heaven's Prisoners (1988)
3. Black Cherry Blues (1989)
4. A Morning for Flamingos (1990)
5. A Stained White Radiance (1992)
6. In the Electric Mist with Confederate Dead (1993)
7. Dixie City Jam (1994)
8. Burning Angel (1995)
9. Cadillac Jukebox (1996)
10. Sunset Limited (1998)
11. Purple Cane Road (2000)
12. Jolie Blon's Bounce (2002)
13. Last Car to Elysian Fields (2003)
14. Crusader's Cross (2005)
15. Pegasus Descending (2006)
16. The Tin Roof Blowdown (2007)
17. Swan Peak (2008)
18. The Glass Rainbow (2010)
19. Creole Belle (2012)
20. Light of the World (2013)
21. Robicheaux (2018)
22. The New Iberia Blues (2019)
23. A Private Cathedral (2020)
24. Clete (2024)
25. The Hadacol Boogie (2026)

== Appearances in movies ==
Robicheaux is played by Alec Baldwin in Heaven's Prisoners and by Tommy Lee Jones in In the Electric Mist.
