= Heaven's Prisoners (novel) =

Novel written by James Lee Burke

- Author: James Lee Burke
- Language: English
- Series: Dave Robicheaux
- Genre: Detective novel
- Publisher: Simon & Schuster
- Publication date: 1988
- Publication place: United States
- Media type: Print (hardback & paperback)
- Pages: 292 pp
- ISBN: 0805006656
- Followed by: Black Cherry Blues

Heaven's Prisoners is a crime novel written by James Lee Burke and published by Simon & Schuster in 1988. The fictional work follows Dave Robicheaux, a retired police officer and army lieutenant, who finds himself in a situation where he must protect his wife and a plane-crash survivor from a local drug kingpin. Heaven's Prisoners is the second novel by James Lee Burke featuring Dave Robicheaux, and was adapted into a film in 1996.

== Plot summary ==
Once an officer for the New Orleans Police Department and before that a U.S. Army infantry lieutenant who fought in the Vietnam War, Robicheaux is living a quiet life in the swamplands of Louisiana with his wife Annie. The couple's tranquility is shattered one day when a drug smuggler's plane crashes in a lake, right before their eyes. Robicheaux succeeds in rescuing a lone survivor, a Salvadoran girl, whom he and Annie quickly adopt and name Alafair. Drug Enforcement Administration Agent Minos P. Dautrieve, however, tells Robicheaux that the plane was connected to Bubba Rocque, the leading drug kingpin in the area, and Robicheaux's childhood friend from New Iberia. Robicheaux must now defend Alafair and Annie from a world of murder and deception.

== Reception ==
Publishers Weekly said, "This is a mystery fans will savor for its ruminating intelligence and graceful prose as well as for its heart-stopping suspense." Kirkus gave it a positive review but noted, "Despite careless plotting (constant but unresolved allusions to malfeasance by US Immigration), there is enough colorful action to keep readers turning the pages; but there is also altogether too much introspection by the self-hating, drowning-in-guilt Robicheaux."

== Release details ==
- 1988, USA, Simon & Schuster, New York, ISBN 0805006656

== Adaptation ==
- Heaven's Prisoners, a 1996 film starring Alec Baldwin
