= The Tin Roof Blowdown =

2007 crime novel by James Lee Burke

- Author: James Lee Burke
- Language: English
- Series: Dave Robicheaux
- Genre: Detective novel
- Publisher: Simon & Schuster
- Publication date: 2007
- Publication place: United States
- Pages: 384
- ISBN: 1501198599
- Followed by: Swan Peak

The Tin Roof Blowdown (2007) is a crime novel by American author James Lee Burke.

The Tin Roof Blowdown was a finalist for the 2008 Anthony Award for Best Novel.

== Synopsis ==
Dave Robicheaux, once an officer for the New Orleans Police Department and before that a U.S. Army infantry lieutenant who fought in the Vietnam War, now works as sheriff's deputy in New Iberia, Louisiana. After Hurricane Katrina devastates his beloved city of New Orleans, Robicheaux is drawn into the fatal shooting of two young black looters, and the subsequent torture murder of a third. Soon several suspects, including an insurance salesman whose daughter may have been brutally raped by the men, and a sadistic gangster whose house they raided, start emerging from the woodwork. However, the investigation becomes much more personal for Dave when his own family comes under threat from an evil sociopath, and he finds himself drowning in a sea of violence, degeneracy and corruption, juxtaposed against the terrible suffering he sees everyday as a result of the hurricane.

== Release details ==
- 2007, USA, Simon & Schuster, New York, ISBN 1501198599
