= Alafair Burke =

American novelist and legal scholar (b.1969)

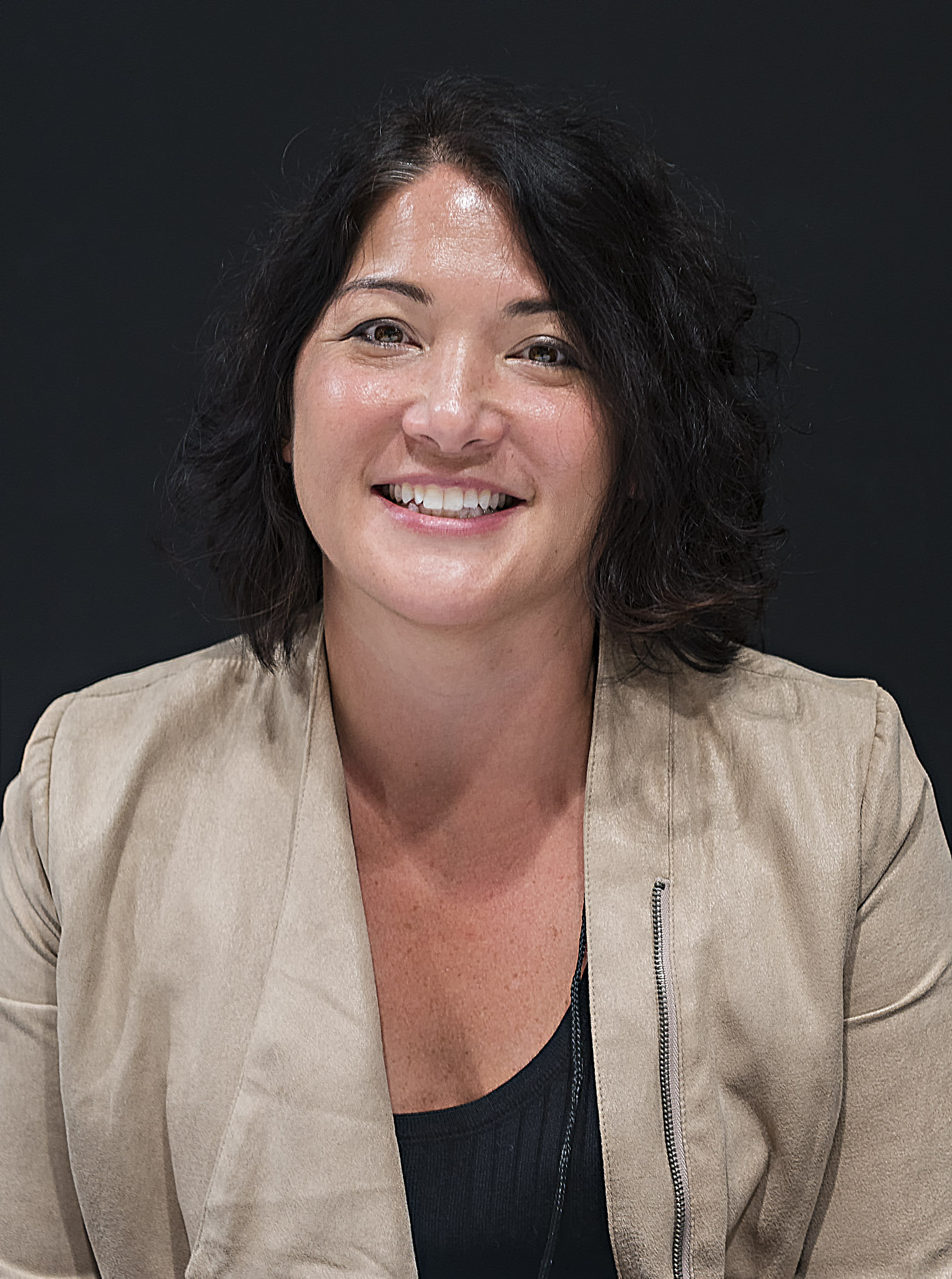
- Burke in 2013 at Bouchercon in Albany, New York
- Born: October 1969 (age 56); Fort Lauderdale, Florida, U.S.
- Education: Stanford Law School; Reed College (BA)
- Occupation: Novelist
- Writing career
- Genres: Crime fiction, mystery, thriller
- Website: alafairburke.com

Alafair S. Burke (born October 1969) is an American crime novelist, professor of law, and legal commentator. She is a New York Times bestselling author of fifteen crime novels, including The Ex, The Wife, The Better Sister, and The Note, and two series—one featuring NYPD Detective Ellie Hatcher; and the other featuring Portland, Oregon prosecutor Samantha Kincaid. She also co-authored eight novels with Mary Higgins Clark. Her books have been translated into more than a dozen languages.

== Background ==
Burke was born in Fort Lauderdale, Florida, and raised primarily in Wichita, Kansas, where her mother, Pearl Pai Chu, was a school librarian and her father, fellow crime novelist James Lee Burke, was a professor of English. She traces her fascination with crime to the hunt for the serial killer known as BTK, who was active in Wichita during the 1970s.

Burke received her Bachelor of Arts in psychology from Reed College, in Portland, Oregon, completing the senior thesis "Emotion's effects on memory: spatial narrowing of attention." She went on to Stanford Law School in California, graduating as a member of Order of the Coif. After law school, she served as a judicial clerk to Betty Binns Fletcher of the United States Court of Appeals for the Ninth Circuit, and then as a Multnomah County Deputy District Attorney in Portland, where she prosecuted domestic violence offenses and served as an in-precinct advisor to the police department.

She currently lives in New York City and is a professor of law at Hofstra University School of Law. She has served on the board of directors of the Mystery Writers of America, and as president of its New York chapter; she was the first woman of color to serve as the organization's president. In 2017, she was elected as a member of the American Law Institute. She is also a member of the board of directors of the Authors Guild Foundation.

In 2014, publisher Simon & Schuster announced that Mary Higgins Clark and Burke were collaborating on the Under Suspicion series, featuring an intrepid television journalist who reinvestigates cold cases.

In 2017, Burke was nominated for an Edgar Award for Best Novel for her book, The Ex.

On May 29, 2025, Amazon Prime Studio premiered a televised adaptation of Burke's novel, The Better Sister, created by Olivia Milch and starring Jessica Biel and Elizabeth Banks.

== Writing techniques ==
Burke's novels are known for their authenticity and often draw on real-world cases and the author's personal and professional experiences.

Burke's Samantha Kincaid series is set in the Multnomah County District Attorney's Office, where Burke worked in the 1990s. In creating NYPD Detective Ellie Hatcher, Burke drew on her experience growing up in Kansas. Like Burke, Hatcher was raised in Wichita. Hatcher's father was a Wichita police detective, who spent his career hunting a serial killer who evaded police for 30 years.

Burke's first novel, Judgment Calls, is loosely based on the case of Keith Hunter Jesperson, a serial killer known as the "Happy-Face Killer" for the smiley faces he drew on his many letters to the media. Angel's Tip was loosely based on the murders of Imette St. Guillen and Jennifer Moore.

In Dead Connection, Ellie Hatcher tracks a serial killer who uses an online dating service to locate his victims. Burke has said that the plot was inspired by her worst nightmares while briefly enrolled on Match.com. Burke subsequently dedicated the book to her husband, writing, "For Sean, I can't believe I found you on a computer."

In the author's note to The Better Sister, Burke described her novels The Ex, The Wife, and The Better Sister as "a thematic trilogy of novels that explore the complexity of female relationships and the diverse roles that women play in contemporary society."

== Novels ==
=== Samantha Kincaid series ===
- Judgment Calls (Samantha Kincaid 1) (2003)
- Missing Justice (Samantha Kincaid 2) (2004)
- Close Case (Samantha Kincaid 3) (2005)

=== Ellie Hatcher series ===
- Dead Connection (Ellie Hatcher 1) (2007)
- Angel's Tip (Ellie Hatcher 2) (2008) (published in the UK as City of Fear)
- 212 (Ellie Hatcher 3) (2010) (published in the UK as City of Lies)
- Never Tell (Ellie Hatcher 4) (2012)
- All Day and a Night (Ellie Hatcher 5) (2014)
- Find Me (Ellie Hatcher 6) (2022)

=== Under Suspicion series ===
- The Cinderella Murder (2014) (with co-author Mary Higgins Clark)
- All Dressed in White (2015) (with co-author Mary Higgins Clark)
- The Sleeping Beauty Killer (2016) (with co-author Mary Higgins Clark)
- Every Breath You Take (2017) (with co-author Mary Higgins Clark)
- You Don't Own Me (2018) (with co-author Mary Higgins Clark)
- Piece of My Heart (2020) (with co-author Mary Higgins Clark)

=== Other novels ===
- Long Gone (2011)
- If You Were Here (2013)
- The Ex (2016)
- The Wife (2018)
- The Better Sister (2019)
- Find Me (2021) (published in the UK as The Girl She Was)
- Where Are the Children Now (2023) (with co-author Mary Higgins Clark)
- The Note (2025)

== Short stories ==
- Winning (2008) (selected for Best American Mystery Stories of 2009)
- The Mother (2012)

== Other works ==
- Got a Warrant?: Breaking Bad and the Fourth Amendment, 13 OHIO ST. J. CRIM. L. 191 (2015)
- Consent Searches and Fourth Amendment Reasonableness, 67 FL. L. REV. 509 (2015)
- Review: Prosecution (is) Complex, 10 OHIO ST. J. CRIM. L. 703 (2013)
- Policing, Protestors, and Discretion, 40 FORDHAM URB. L.J. 999 (2013)
- Prosecutors and Peremptories, 97 IOWA L. REV. 1467 (2012)
- The Community Prosecutor: Questions of Professional Discretion, 47 WAKE FOREST L. REV. 285 (2012) (with co-author Bruce Green)
- I Got the Shotgun: Reflections on The Wire, Prosecutors, and Omar Little, 8 OHIO ST. CRIM. L. J. 447 (2011)
- When Family Matters, 119 YALE L. J. 1210 (2010)
- Prosecutorial Agnosticism, 57 8 OHIO ST. CRIM. L. J. 79 (2010)
- Talking About Prosecutors, 31 CARDOZO L. REV. 2119 (2010)
- Classroom Storytelling, 78 UMKC L. REV. 1031 (2010)
- Domestic Violence Misdemeanor Prosecutions and the New Policing, in CRIMINAL LAW CONVERSATIONS (Robinson, Ferzan, and Garvey eds.) (Oxford University Press, 2009)
- Revisiting Prosecutorial Disclosure, 84 INDIANA LAW J. 481 (2009)
- Comment, Brady's Brainteaser: The Accidental Prosecutor and Cognitive Bias, 57 CASE W. RES. L. REV. 575 (2007)
- Prosecutorial Passion, Cognitive Bias, and Plea Bargaining, 91 MARQUETTE L. REV. 183 (2007)
- Neutralizing Cognitive Bias: An Invitation to Prosecutors, 2 N.Y.U. LAW & LIBERTY 512 (2007)
- Domestic Violence as a Crime of Pattern and Intent: An Alternative Reconceptualization, 75 GEORGE WASHINGTON L. REV. 552 (2007)
- Lawless Neptune, in NEPTUNE NOIR (Rob Thomas, ed., 2007) (discussing the depiction of law in the popular television show Veronica Mars)
- Improving Prosecutorial Decision Making: Some Lessons of Cognitive Science, 47 WILLIAM & MARY L. REV. 1587 (2006)
- "Administrative Searches," "Arrest Without Warrant," and "Board of Education v. Earls," in THE ENCYCLOPEDIA OF AMERICAN CIVIL LIBERTIES (2006)
- Review: Murder and the Reasonable Man: Passion and Fear in the Criminal Courtroom, 103 MICH. L. REV. 1043 (2005)
- Unpacking New Policing: Confessions of a Former Neighborhood District Attorney, 78 WASH. L. REV. 985 (2003)
- Rational Actors, Self-Defense, and Duress: Making Sense, Not Syndromes, Out of the Battered Woman, 81 N.C. L. REV. 211 (2002)
- A Few Straight Men: Homosexuals in the Military and Equal Protection, 6 STAN. LAW & POL. REV. 109 (1994)
- Note, Reconciling Professional Ethics and Prosecutorial Power: The No Contact Rule Debate, 46 STAN. L. REV. 1635 (1994)
- Remembering Emotional Events, 20 MEMORY & COGNITION 277 (1992) (with co-authors F. Heuer & D. Reisberg)
