= Amber (given name) =

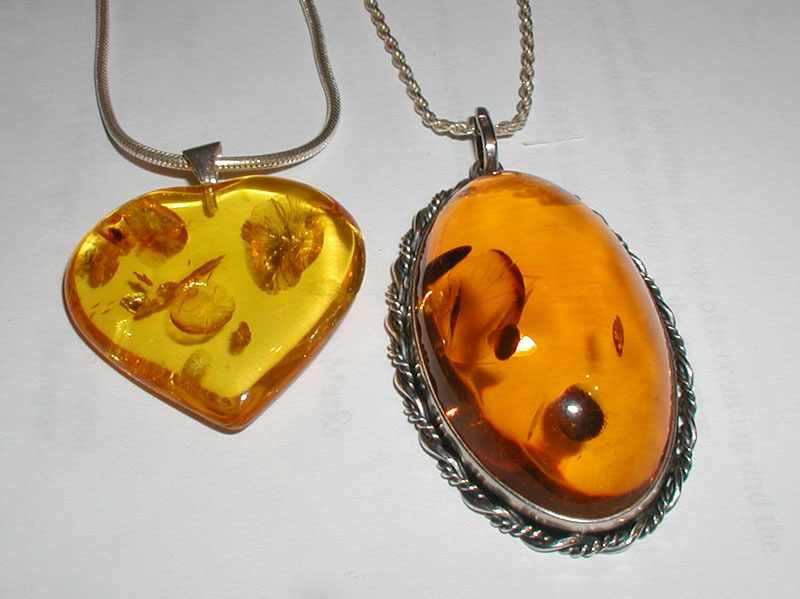
- Amber is used to make jewelry, which has helped inspire the name.
- Pronunciation: /ˈæmbər/ AM-ber
- Gender: Female

Origin
- Origin: from Arabic ʿanbar عنبر (ultimately from Middle Persian ambar) via Middle Latin ambar and Middle French ambre.
- Meaning: "amber"

Amber is a feminine given name taken from amber, the fossilized tree resin that is often used in the making of jewelry. The word can also refer to a yellowish-orange color.

The name was in occasional use in the early 1800s, according to United States census records. It first came into regular use in the Anglosphere in the late 1800s along with other gemstone names popular during the Victorian era. It rose in popularity following the release of the 1944 historical romance novel Forever Amber by American author Kathleen Winsor. Amber has been a popular name in most English speaking countries. In the United States, it ranked among the top 1,000 names at different points between 1880 and 1916 and again consistently between 1945 and 2024. It peaked in usage there in the 1990s, when it was the 20th most popular name in the United States. It has ranked among the top 50 names for girls in England and Wales, Scotland, Ireland, Belgium, Australia and Canada in recent years. Variants have also been popular in other countries, including Ámbar in Spanish, which is currently among the most popular names for girls in Argentina, Ambre in French, which was among the top 10 names for newborn girls in France in recent years, and the Italian Ambra, which was among the top 10 names for baby girls in Albania and among the top 50 names for newborn girls in Italy in recent years.

English elaborations of the name in use include Amberlee, Amberleigh, Amberley, Amberli, Amberlie, Amberlin, Amberlinn, Amberly, Amberlyn and Amberlynn, among others.

== Women ==
- Amber (performer) (born 1969), Dutch pop music/dance music performer and singer
- Amber, stage name for Rie Eto (born 1973), Japanese pop music artist
- Amber Agar (born 1976), English actress
- Amber Aguirre (born 1958), American ceramic sculptor
- Amber Allen (born 1975), Canadian professional soccer player
- Amber An (born 1985), Taiwanese actress, singer, television host, and model
- Amber Anderson (born 1992), British actress, pianist, and model
- Amber Anning (born 2000), British runner
- Amber Arcades (born 1988), Dutch singer-songwriter
- Amber Arlint, American politician
- Amber Atherton (born 1991), British entrepreneur and investor
- Amber Bain (born 1995), birth name of The Japanese House, English indie pop musician
- Amber Baker, American politician
- Amber Balcaen (born 1992), Canadian professional stock car racing driver
- Amber Barrett (born 1996), Irish international footballer
- Amber Barretto, American actress
- Amber Bellringer (born 1990), New Zealand netball player
- Amber Benson (born 1977), American actress
- Amber Bondin (born 1991), Maltese singer
- Amber Bowman (born 1985), Canadian ice hockey player and firefighter
- Amber Boykins (born 1969), American politician
- Amber Bracken (born 1984), Canadian photojournalist
- Amber Bradley (born 1980), Western Australian former rower
- Amber Brantsen (born 1989), Dutch broadcaster and journalist
- Amber Briggle, American activist
- Amber Brock (born 1980), American author
- Amber Brooks (born 1991), American NWSL player
- Amber Brown (fighter) (born 1988), American mixed martial arts fighter
- Amber Bullock (born 1986), American urban contemporary gospel artist and musician
- Amber Butchart (born 1980/1981), British fashion historian and writer
- Amber Campbell (born 1981), American hammer thrower
- Amber Campisi, American model, Playmate of the month for February 2005
- Amber Carrington, American contestant on The Voice (American season 4)
- Amber Case (born c. 1986), American cyborg anthropologist, user experience designer, and public speaker
- Amber Chia (born 1981), Malaysian model and actress
- Amber Christine Meidinger (born 1990), American convicted criminal
- Amber Clarke (born 2004), Australian AFLW player
- Amber Coffman (born 1984), American singer-songwriter
- Amber Cope (born 1983), American professional stock car racing driver
- Amber Copley, American beauty pageant titleholder
- Amber Corwin (born 1978), American figure skater
- Amber Cowan (born 1981), American artist and educator
- Amber Cox (born 1973/1974), American sports executive
- Amber Creek (1982–1997), American murder victim
- Amber Curreen (born c. 1985), New Zealand actress and theatre producer
- Amber D. Miller, American experimental cosmologist
- Amber D (born 1982), British hard dance DJ
- Amber Dalton, American professional esports player
- Amber Davies (born 1996), Welsh actress and television personality
- Amber Dawn, Canadian writer, editor, and poet
- Amber de Botton, British journalist and political adviser
- Amber Dermont, American author and professor
- Amber Dotson, American country music artist
- Amber DuBois (1994–2009), American murder victim
- Amber Duncan (?–1993), American murder victim
- Amber E. Boydstun, American political- and data scientist
- Amber English (born 1989), American sport shooter
- Amber Fallon (born 1983), American editor and horror story writer
- Amber Fares, Lebanese Canadian filmmaker, documentarian, director, and cinematographer
- Amber Ferenz (born 1972), American musician, music educator, and composer
- Amber Ferreira (born 1982), American triathlete, coach, and endurance athlete
- Amber Fiser, American WPF player
- Amber Fleury (born 1979), Canadian recording artist
- Amber Frank (born 1998), American actress
- Amber Frey (1975–2002), American mistress of convicted murderer Scott Peterson
- Amber Galloway (born 1977), American sign language interpreter, especially of songs
- Amber Gaylor (born 1995), English association footballer
- Amber Gell (born 1984), American program manager, former engineer and scientist, and STEM education advocate
- Amber Gersjes (born 1997), Dutch judoka
- Amber Giles (born 1992), birth name of Mija (DJ), American DJ, music producer, and promoter
- Amber Gill (born 1997), English television personality and author
- Amber Glenn (born 1999), American figure skater
- Amber Gray, American actress and singer
- Amber Guyger (born 1988), American convicted murderer
- Amber Hagerman (1986–1996), American murder victim, after whom the Amber alert was named
- Amber Hall (basketball) (born 1977), Canadian former WNBA player
- Amber Hall (rugby league) (born 1995), New Zealand rugby league footballer
- Amber Halliday (born 1979), South Australian former rower and cyclist
- Amber Harris (born 1988), American WNBA player
- Amber Harrison (born 1945), alternate name of Fiona Richmond, English former glamour model and actress
- Amber Hayes, American country music singer-songwriter
- Amber Heard (born 1986), American actress
- Amber Hearn (born 1984), New Zealand former professional soccer player
- Amber Hikes, American civil rights activist
- Amber Hodgkiss (born 1991), British actress
- Amber Holcomb (born 1994), American singer
- Amber Holland (born 1974), Canadian curler
- Amber Holt (born 1985), American WNBA player
- Amber Hughes (born 1994), American triple jumper and hurdler
- Amber Hunt, several people
- Amber Hurst Martin, American singer and actress
- Amber J. Lawson (born 1972), American producer, entrepreneur, and online content- and development executive
- Amber Jackson (born 1984), American former college- and professional softball player, and former college softball head coach
- Amber Jacobs (born 1982), American former WNBA player
- Amber-Jade Sanderson (born 1976), Australian politician
- Amber Joiner (born 1976), American politician
- Amber Joseph (born 1999), Barbadian cyclist
- Amber Joy Vinson, American nurse who tested positive for the Ebola virus
- Amber K (born 1947), pseudonym of Kitty Randall, American occult writer
- Amber Kaldor (born 1990), Australian acrobatic gymnast
- Amber Kani (born 1991), New Zealand rugby league footballer
- Amber-Keegan Stobbs (born 1992), English professional footballer
- Amber Kelleher-Andrews, American relationship matchmaker
- Amber Kirk-Ford (born 1998), British columnist, blogger, and vlogger
- Amber Kraak (born 1994), Dutch cyclist
- Amber Kuo (born 1986), Taiwanese singer and actress
- Amber L. Hollibaugh (1946–2023), American writer, filmmaker, activist, and organizer
- Amber L. Puha, American mathematician and educator
- Amber Lancaster (born 1980), American television personality
- Amber Lawrence (born 1978), Australian country music singer-songwriter-guitarist
- Amber Le Bon (born 1989), English fashion model
- Amber Lee Connors (born 1991), American voice actress, dubbing director, and line producer
- Amber Lee Ettinger (born 1982), American actress, Internet celebrity, model, and singer
- Amber Leibrock (born 1988), American mixed martial artist
- Amber Littlejohn (born 1975), Native American professional figure competitor
- Amber Liu, several people
- Amber Lu (born 1989), alternate name of Lu Shan (actress), Chinese actress and model
- Amber Lynn (disambiguation), several people
- Amber Lyon (born 1982), American investigative journalist, filmmaker, and photographer
- Amber MacArthur (born 1976), Canadian Internet- and television personality
- Amber Mae Cecil (1938–1998), Australian radio-, theatre-, and television actress
- Amber Marchese (born 1977), American television personality and entrepreneur
- Amber Mariano (born 1978), American television personality
- Amber Mariano (politician) (born 1995), American politician
- Amber Marie Bollinger, American actress
- Amber Mark (born 1993), American singer, songwriter, and producer
- Amber Marks (born 1977), British barrister and author
- Amber Marshall, several people
- Amber Maximus (born 1997), Belgian footballer
- Amber McBride, American author, poet, and professor
- Amber McLaughlin (1973–2023), American transgender woman executed for rape and murder
- Amber McNaught (born 1976), British blogger, author, and former local journalist
- Amber McReynolds (born 1979), American election administration expert
- Amber Merritt (born 1993), English-born Australian wheelchair basketball player
- Amber Midthunder (born 1997), American actress
- Amber Morley, Canadian politician
- Amber Moss-Birch (born 2005), English boxer
- Amber Musser, English professor of women, gender, and sexuality studies
- Amber Nash (born 1977), American actress and improvisational comedian
- Amber Neben (born 1975), American racing cyclist
- Amber Neilson (born 1984), Australian retired soccer player
- Amber Ojeda, American contestant on Platinum Hit
- Amber O'Neal (born 1974), American professional wrestler
- Amber Parkinson (born 1976), Australian épée fencer
- Amber Pate (born 1995), Australian professional cyclist
- Amber Peebles (born 1983), New Zealand TV host and beauty pageant titleholder
- Amber Penrith (born 1980), English rugby union player
- Amber Peterson (born 1982), Canadian freestyle skier
- Amber Petty, Australian contestant on Australian Survivor (season 2)
- Amber Pierce (born 1981), American professional racing cyclist
- Amber Pilley (born 1997), Australian former rugby league footballer
- Amber Portwood (born 1990), American reality television personality and convicted criminal
- Amber Preston, American stand-up comedian
- Amber Ramirez (born 1998), American basketball player
- Amber Rayne (1984–2016), American pornographic actress
- Amber Reed (born 1991), English rugby union player
- Amber Reeves (1887–1981), New Zealand-born British feminist writer and scholar
- Amber Richards (1957–1996), American transgender female impersonator, performer, and television personality
- Amber Richards (set decorator), New Zealand set decorator
- Amber Riley (born 1986), American actress, most famous for her role on the television series Glee as Mercedes
- Amber Chardae Robinson (born 1989), actress
- Amber Robles-Gordon (born 1977), American mixed media visual artist
- Amber Rolfzen (born 1994), American volleyball player
- Amber Rose (born 1983), American model
- Amber Rose Kandarian (born 1982), Armenian-American filmmaker
- Amber Rose Revah (born 1986), British actress, writer, and voice artist
- Amber-Rose Rush (?–2018), New Zealand murder victim
- Amber Rubarth, American singer-songwriter and actress
- Amber Rudd (born 1963), British politician, MP for Hastings and Rye, former Home Secretary
- Amber Ruffin (born 1979), American writer, comedian, and talk-show host
- Amber Rutter (born 1997), English sport shooter
- Amber S. Boehnlein, American particle physicist, computer scientist, and administrator
- Amber Sainsbury (born 1978), New Zealand actress, philanthropist, and producer
- Amber Savva (born 1993), English actress and theatre producer
- Amber Scorah, Canadian-American writer, speaker, and activist
- Amber Scott (born 1982/1983), Australian ballet dancer
- Amber Sealey, British-American actress, screenwriter, and film producer- and director
- Amber Settle, American computer scientist and professor of education and theory
- Amber Seyer, American beauty pageant titleholder
- Amber Share, American author and illustrator
- Amber Shepherd, birth name of Amba Shepherd (born 1991), Australian singer
- Amber Sherlock (born 1975), Australian journalist, television news presenter, and reporter
- Amber Sibley, American make-up artist
- Amber Siyavus (1980–2026), American waitress, and contestant on Big Brother 8 (American season)
- Amber Skye Noyes (born 1988), American actress and singer
- Amber Slagle (born 1996), American professional stock car racing driver, crew chief, and engineer
- Amber Smith (disambiguation), several people
- Amber Stevens West (born 1986), American actress
- Amber Stachowski (born 1983), American water polo player
- Amber Stocks, American WNBA executive consultant, coach, and former player
- Amber Straughn (born c. 1979), American astrophysicist
- Amber Swartz-Garcia (1980–?), American kidnapping victim
- Amber Tamblyn (born 1983), American actress
- Amber Tang (born 1995), Hong Kong hostess and actress
- Amber Templemore-Finlayson, British film- and television director
- Amber Theoharis (born 1978), American journalist, sports anchor- and reporter, documentary film producer, and tech executive
- Amber Thomas (born 1993), Canadian Paralympic swimmer
- Amber Torrealba (born 1990), American skimboarder and filmmaker
- Amber Tuccaro (1990–?), Canadian First Nations woman who went missing in 2010, and found dead in 2012
- Amber Tysiak (born 2000), Belgian professional footballer
- Amber Valletta (born 1974), American actress and model
- Amber van der Hulst (born 1999), Dutch professional racing cyclist
- Amber Verspaget (born 1998), Dutch footballer
- Amber Wadham (born 1996), Australian Internet personality, also known as Paladin Amber
- Amber Wagner (born 1980), American soprano
- Amber Ward (born 2001), Australian rules footballer
- Amber Welty (born 1967), American former track and field athlete
- Amber Whiting, American college basketball coach
- Amber Wutich, American anthropologist and professor
- Amber Yobech (born 1991), Palauan swimmer

== Men ==
- Amber Gurung (1938–2016), Nepalese composer, singer, and lyricist

== Fictional characters ==
- Amber Addison, in the US TV series Hannah Montana, played by Shanica Knowles
- Amber Atkins, in the 1999 US black comedy mockumentary film Drop Dead Gorgeous, played by Kirsten Dunst
- Amber Bailey, in the Irish TV crime drama series Amber, played by Lauryn Canny
- Amber Brown, in a book by Paula Danziger
- Amber Freeman, in the Scream series, played by Mikey Madison
- Amber Gemstone, in the US black comedy crime TV series The Righteous Gemstones, played by Cassidy Freeman
- Amber Harvey, in the UK medical soap opera Doctors, played by Lisa Ellis
- Amber Hearst, in the UK TV programme series The Story of Tracy Beaker, played by Alicia Hooper
- Amber Hilliard, in the 2010 US comedy film Grown Ups, played by Jamie Chung
- Amber Hunt, in Malibu Comics' Exiles comic book series
- Amber Johannsen, in the UK police procedural TV series The Bill, played by Myfanwy Waring
- Amber Kalirai, in the UK TV soap opera Coronation Street, played by Nikki Patel
- Amber Mariens, in the 1995 US coming-of-age teen comedy film Clueless, and the TV series of the same name, played by Elisa Donovan
- Amber Martin, in the Australian TV soap opera Neighbours, played by Alison Whyte
- Amber Millington, in the US TV series House of Anubis, played by Ana Mulvoy-Ten
- Amber Moore, in the US TV soap operas The Bold and the Beautiful and The Young and the Restless, played by Adrienne Frantz
- Amber Murdoch, in the Scottish TV soap opera River City, played by Lorna Anderson and Jenny Hulse
- Amber Pigal-Simpson, Homer Simpson's illegal wife, voiced by Pamela Hayden
- Amber Sharpe, in the UK soap opera Hollyoaks, played by Lydia Lloyd-Henry and Lauren Gabrielle-Thomas
- Amber Simmons, in the Australian TV soap opera Home and Away, played by Maddy Jevic
- Amber Sweet, in the 2008 US Gothic rock opera Repo! The Genetic Opera, played by Paris Hilton
- Amber Turner, in the Australian TV soap opera Neighbours, played by Jenna Rosenow
- Amber Volakis, in the US TV series House, played by Anne Dudek
- Amber Von Tussle, in the 1988 US comedy film Hairspray, played by Colleen Ann Fitzpatrick & later played by Dove Cameron in Hairspray Live
- Amber Williams, in the 2006 US direct-to-video slasher film I'll Always Know What You Did Last Summer, played by Brooke Nevin
- Amber, in the 1952 Hindi costume action romance thriller film Amber, played by Tanuja (young Amber) and Nargis (adult Amber)
- Amber, in the US television series Andi Mack, played by Emily Skinner
- Amber, in the anime series Darker than Black
- Amber (The One-Legged Hypoglycemic), in Saturday Night Live, played by Amy Poehler
- Princess Amber, in the US animated series Sofia the First, voiced by Darcy Rose Byrnes
