= Amberley =

Amberley may refer to:

== Places ==
=== Australia ===
- Amberley, Queensland, near Ipswich, Australia
- RAAF Base Amberley, a Royal Australian Air Force military airbase

=== United Kingdom ===
- Amberley, Gloucestershire, England
- Amberley, Herefordshire, England
- Amberley, West Sussex, England
  - Amberley railway station, in West Sussex, England

=== Elsewhere ===
- Amberley, New Zealand, in north Canterbury
- Amberley, Ohio, US, a village in the Cincinnati metropolitan area
- Amberley, Ontario, Canada

== People ==
- Amberley (given name)
- John Russell, Viscount Amberley (1842–1876), British politician and writer
- Viscount Amberley, a courtesy title attached to that of Earl Russell

== Other ==
- Josiah Amberley, the title character in The Adventure of the Retired Colourman by Arthur Conan Doyle
- Amberley Publishing, a British publishing house
