= Second to Nun =

2017 American musical

Marguerite (formerly titled Second To Nun) is a musical, with book and lyrics by Anton Dudley and music by Michael Cooper, based on the life of French-Canadian Saint Marguerite Bourgeoys.

Told in song and monologue, the show is based on the heroic life of pioneer woman and Canada's first female saint Marguerite Bourgeoys. A one-person musical, Marguerite "recounts Marguerite's death-defying journey to bring liberated women to the New World and help build the city of Montreal."

The world premiere production, starring Molly Pope, ran June 29 to August 5, 2017 at Zeiders American Dream Theater in Virginia Beach, Virginia.

The musical was originally workshopped in New York City at Playwrights Realm in March 2016, starring Tony Award winner Cady Huffman, and further developed at Phoenix Theater in Phoenix, Arizona, in May.

The Astoria Performing Arts Center in Queens, New York will produce the New York Premiere of the show, now titled Marguerite, in November 2019, starring Tony Winning actress Cady Huffman.</ref>

The original cast recording of Marguerite was produced by APAC and is scheduled for release by Broadway Records on March 5, 2021.<ref>[https://www.broadwayrecords.com/offbroadway/marguerite-original-cast-recording
