= Tuccaro =

Tuccaro is a surname. Notable people with the surname include:

- Amber Tuccaro (1990–2010), Canadian disappeared woman
- George Tuccaro (born 1950), Canadian politician
