= Ferenz =

Ferenz is a surname. Notable people with the surname include:

- Amber Ferenz (born 1972), American musician, music educator, and composer
- Ion Ferenz (1932–2003), Romanian ice hockey player
