= Boydstun =

Boydstun is a surname. Notable people with the surname include:

- Amber E. Boydstun, American political scientist and data scientist
- Patty Boydstun (born 1951), American alpine skier
