= Amber Hurst Martin =

American singer and actress

Amber Hurst Martin is an American singer and actress. Her first national tour was with Jesus Christ Superstar and she has also appeared across the U.S., the Caribbean and South Korea with Disney Cruises, Sunfish The Musical and the It Gets Better Tour. Her television appearances as a solo vocalist with the It Gets Better tour cast include Dance Moms and I Am Cait.

Amber is known for her "dazz[ling] agile pop-belt tone quality." Her solo cabaret "You Can't Act a Color" made its world premiere at Rockwell Table & Stage in Los Angeles on September 5, 2017.
