= Amber Torrealba =

American skimboarder and filmmaker

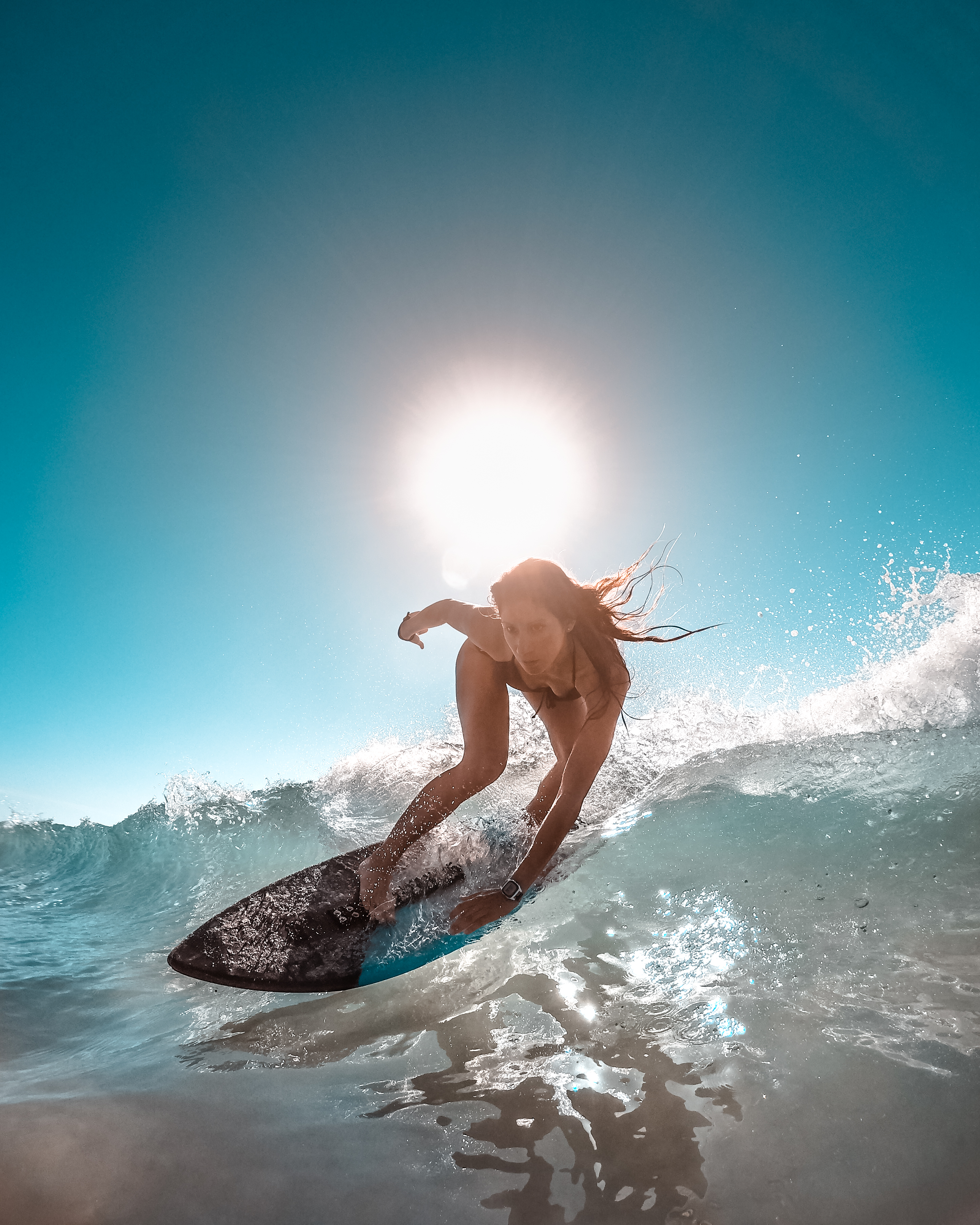
- Amber Torrealba, backside wrap in Laguna Beach, CA

Personal information
- Full name: Amber Torrealba
- Born: July 1, 1990 (age 35) Melbourne, Florida
- Height: 5 ft 5 in (1.65 m)
- Weight: 125 lb (57 kg)
- Website: ambertorrealba.com

Sport
- Country: United States
- Sport: Skimboarding
- Turned pro: 2014

Amber Torrealba (born July 1, 1990) is a 5X VIC World Champion skimboarder and filmmaker.

Before Amber became a professional skimboarder, she was born and raised on the east coast in Palm Bay, Florida, and is now currently based in Laguna Beach, California. She has been skimboarding since 17 years of age and has been competing in the women's professional skimboarding division since 2014. Amber is also actively involved in filmmaking and the production of content in many other action sports. She has created videos with companies such as Red Bull and Adobe, and many other leading media brands. In early years Amber was featured as Leading Lady in the Pulse Skimboarding Magazine, and after migrating to Southern California, Torrealba ranked in several professional competitions including 2nd Place at the Skim USA OBX Skim Jam, 1st Place at the Santa Cruz SkimBlast and went on to clinch the Vic Women's World Championship of Skimboarding in 2016, 2018, 2019, and 2023. In 2018, 2019, 2022 she was ranked 3rd in the world on the United Skim Tour, and then secured her 5th Title at The VIC 2024.

== Film ==
Torrealba's short film "No One" starring herself and Chabe White, was released in 2023.

Amber has directed, edited, and produced content for brands such as Red Bull, Motorola, Sea Doo, Michelob ULTRA, Vayner Media, and is an ambassador for Adobe as the face of their new all device editing program, Premiere Rush.

== Sponsors ==
As of 2024, Torrealba is sponsored by: Sea Doo, Victoria Skimboards, Body Glove, Blenders Eyewear, Freestyle Watches, Let's Party Traction, and Hollyland Tech.

== Appearances ==
Torrealba has made appearances in print, billboard, movie premieres, and TV commercials across her career for Adobe, Sea Doo, Blenders Eyewear, Panasonic, Visit California, DC and others.

== Early life ==
Amber was skateboarder and varsity athlete pursuing college basketball. She started her own skateboarding brand fresh out of Melbourne High School, sponsoring riders such as Tyson Peterson before he went pro. Torrealba graduated from the University of Central Florida in 2011 and managed a Million Dollar Radioshack Corporate Store before leaving her day job to focus on skimboarding and filmmaking in 2015.

== Highlighted Contests ==
Competition	Place	Year
Vic Championships	1st	2024
Vic Championships	1st	2023
Vic World Championships	1st	2019
Vic World Championships	1st	2018
Vic World Championships	1st	2016
