= Amber Tang =

Hong Kong actress

- 鄧卓殷
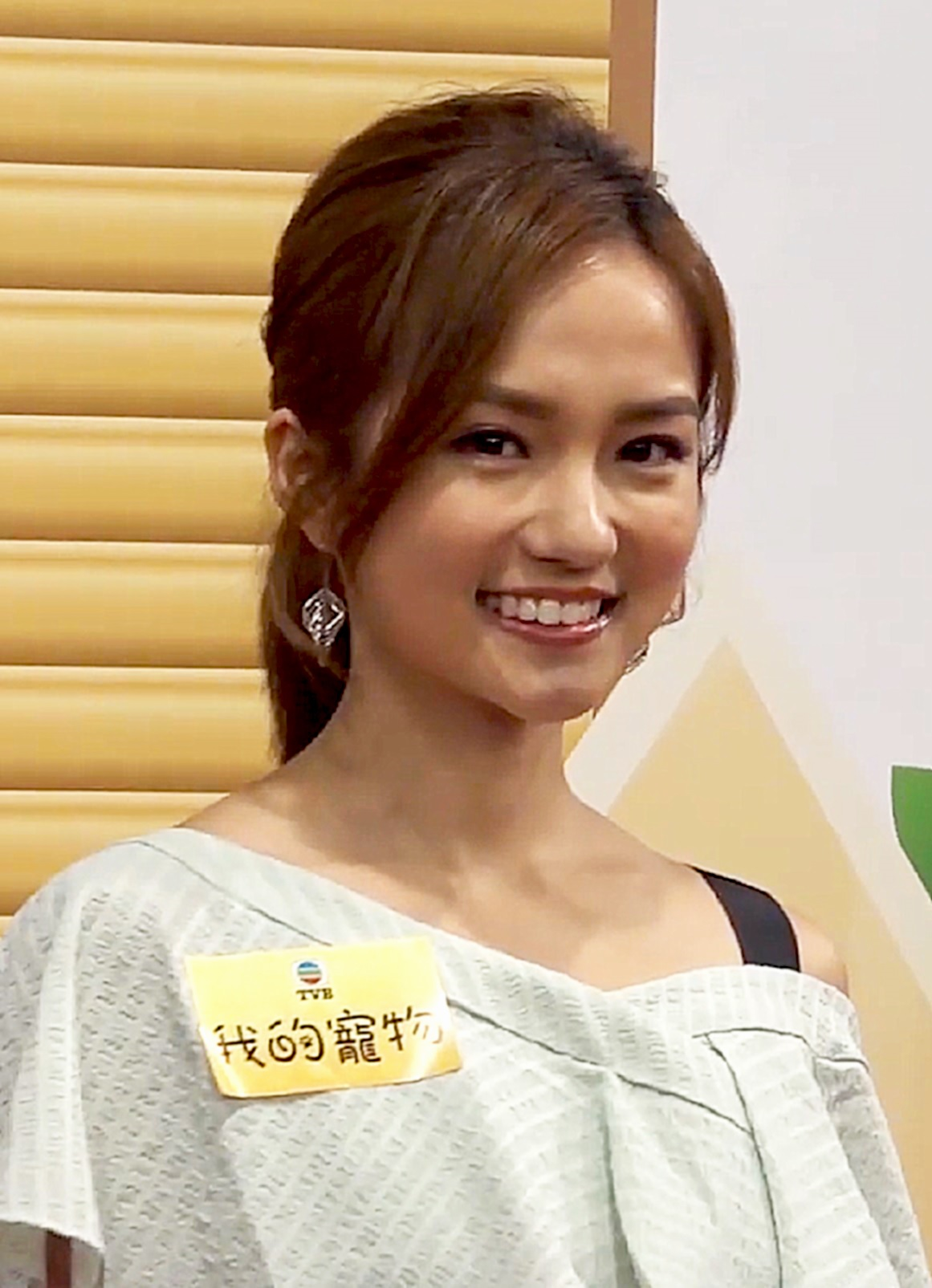
- Tang in 2019
- Born: 30 April 1995 (age 31); Hong Kong
- Other name: Apple → Amber
- Education: University of Hong Kong
- Beauty pageant titleholder
- Title: first runner up in Miss Hong Kong 2018
- Years active: 2018–present
- Major competition: Miss Hong Kong

Chinese name
- Traditional Chinese: 鄧卓殷
- Simplified Chinese: 邓卓殷
Transcriptions
Standard Mandarin
- Hanyu Pinyin: Dèng Zhuōyīn
Yue: Cantonese
- Jyutping: Tang^{4} Cheuk^{1} Yan^{1}

Amber Tang (Chinese: 鄧卓殷; pinyin: Dèng Zhuōyīn; Jyutping: Tang^{4} Cheuk^{1} Yan^{1}; born 30 April 1995), is a Hong Kong hostess and actress. She was the first runner-up and Miss Photogenic in the Miss Hong Kong 2018 Pageant.

== Early and personal life ==
Amber Tang graduated from Heep Yunn Primary School (2007) and Heep Yunn School (2013) and obtained 5** in 4 subjects in the Hong Kong Diploma of Secondary Education Examination before completing her Architecture degree at the School of Architecture at The University of Hong Kong. After graduating in 2017, she worked as an Architectural trainee, participating in the A&D Trophy Awards 2017 under the theme of "Vertical Courtyard", where she won the Merit Award in the Student Sector Architecture category.

In 2018, Tang participated in the 46th Miss Hong Kong Pageant where she was crowned first runner up as well as Miss Photogenic in the Miss Hong Kong 2018 Pageant. In mid-October 2018, Tang signed a contract with TVB to become a manager contract artist and enrolled in a two-month short-term TVB artist training course. In March of the following year, she and her brother Derek Tang launched the YouTube channel "WE ARE NOT TWINS", where they mainly upload short videos to share interesting stories about life, but then quit due to her acting work.

== Controversy ==
In May 2019, Hong Kong media reported that Amber Tang suspected of having an affair with TVB male artist Arnold Kwok (郭子豪), and the two were accused of having an affair with each other at the beginning of the year during the filming the TVB show "Entertain Everyone", often meeting in the gym. In April, some netizens once witnessed Kwok taking advantage of his girlfriend's job in the United States to be with a woman suspected to be Amber Tang. Some netizens compared Tang's dress with some photos of Kwok and the woman traveling, inferring that the woman in the photo was Tang; in addition, the media also took photos of the two visiting a real estate together, showing that the two sides behaved intimately. In response to the incident, Kwok claimed that the "breakup" did not involve a third party, even though his ex-girlfriend accused him through social platforms that "someone is lying" . In July 2020, Arnold Kwok publicly admitted to associating with Amber Tang.

== Filmography ==
=== Television dramas ===
Year	Title	Role	Notes
2020	Come Home Love: Lo and Behold	Female classmate	Ep.989
2020	Legal Mavericks 2020	Chan Shi-yim	Ep.1-4
2021	The Runner	Tiffany	
2021	Kids' Lives Matter	Lee Wing-ga	Ep. 8, 15
2021	The Ringmaster	Anson	
2022	Brutally Young 2.0	Shum Hiu-tung	Supporting Role
TBA	Integrity Sniper Shady		

=== Television Host ===
- The Hong Kong Games (2019)
- Fluffie Sarena (2019)
