= Miss Hong Kong 2018 =

- Date: 26 August 2018
- Presenters: Carol Cheng (鄭裕玲), 6 Wing @ FAMA (陸永@農夫), C Kwan @ FAMA (C君@農夫), Mayanne Mak (麥美恩), Luk Ho Ming (陸浩明), Edwin Siu (蕭正楠), Raymond Cho (曹永廉), Louisa Mak (麥明詩), Crystal Fung(馮盈盈)
- Venue: TVB City
- Broadcaster: TVB
- Entrants: 20
- Winner: Hera Chan
- Photogenic: Stephanie Lee

The Miss Hong Kong Pageant 2018 (2018香港小姐競選) was the 46th Miss Hong Kong pageant held in TVB City, Hong Kong on 26 August 2018. 20 delegates competed for this title.

2017 Miss Hong Kong winner Juliette Louie crowned her successor Hera Chan. Winner Hera Chan went go on to represent Hong Kong at the 2019 Miss Chinese International Pageant and won.

== Results ==
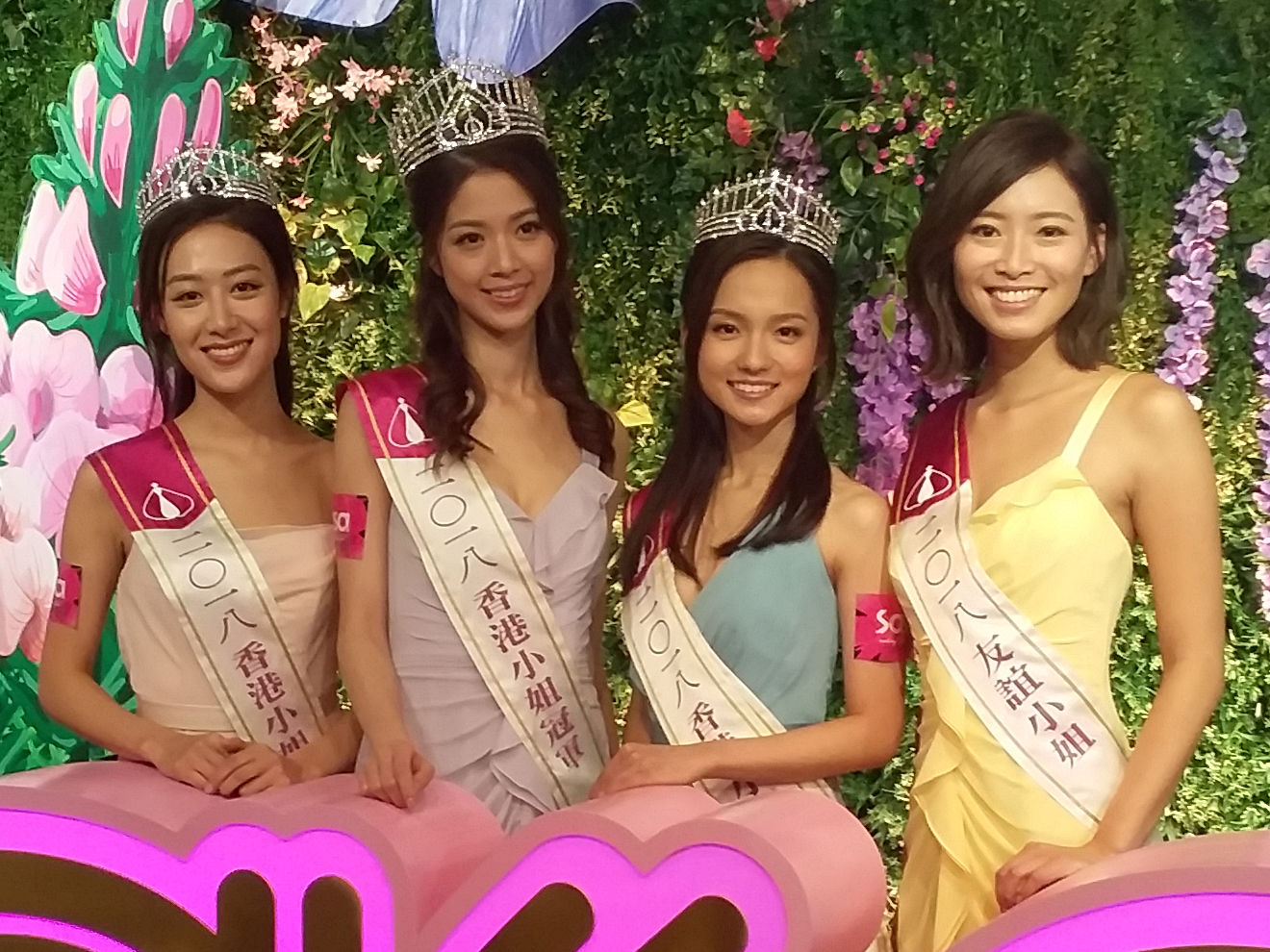
From Left: Miss Hong Kong 2018 2nd runner-up Sara Ting (丁子田), Champion Hera Chan (陳曉華), 1st runner-up Amber Tang (鄧卓殷), Miss Friendship Claudia Chan (陳靜堯)

=== Placements ===
Final results	Contestant
Miss Hong Kong 2018	17 – Hera Chan
1st runner-up	20 – Amber Tang
2nd runner-up	7 – Sara Ting
Top 5	14 – Honey Ho; 15 – Tania Chan
Top 12	2 – Kathy Chong; 3 – Jenny Leung; 4 – Venus Tang; 10 – Stephanie Lee; 11 – Samantha Li; 16 – Rachel Wong; 18 – Kelly Ko

=== Special awards ===
These awards were given during the telecast of the pageant on August 26:

- Miss Photogenic: Amber Tang (鄧卓殷)
- Miss Friendship: Claudia Chan (陳靜堯)

The following awards were given during sponsor or promotion event.

- Sasa Beauty Award: Hera Chan (陳曉華)
- Sasa Talent Award: Sara Ting (丁子田) and Claudia Chan (陳靜堯)
- Luk Fook Jewellery Award: Grace Lan (蘭倚婷)
- Miss Best Talent: Krystl Kung (鞏姿希)

== Delegates ==
The Miss Hong Kong 2018 delegates were:

No.	Contestant	Age	Height	Note
1	Grace Lan 蘭倚婷	23	5'7"	
2	Kathy Chong 庄嘉慧	26	5'5"	
3	Jenny Leung 梁致欣	23	5'2½"	Miss Australia Chinese Pageant 2016 Top 12 Finalist
4	Venus Tang 鄧美欣	25	5'6¾"	
5	Krystl Kung 鞏姿希	25	5'9¼"	
6	Olivia To 杜愛恩	23	5'7¼"	
7	Sara Ting 丁子田	24	5'5"	2nd runner-up
8	Claudia Chan 陳靜堯	25	5'6¾"	Miss Friendship
9	Yutori Kudo 工藤佑采	25	5'7¾"	
10	Stephanie Lee 李芷晴	25	5'8"	
11	Samantha Li 李明芙	23	5'1"	
12	Christy Tung 童銘欣	23	5'6¾"	
13	Linsy Lai 黎智	23	5'8½"	
14	Honey Ho 何泳芍	24	5'4"	Top 5 Finalist
15	Tania Chan 陳苑澄	23	5'5"	Top 5 Finalist
16	Rachel Wong 黃子桐	23	5'5¾"	
17	Hera Chan 陳曉華	23	5'8"	Winner, later Miss Chinese International 2019
18	Kelly Ko 高育英	22	5'4¾"	
19	Krystal Yang 楊帆	20	5'4¼"	
20	Amber Tang 鄧卓殷	23	5'3"	1st runner-up, Miss Photogenic

== Elimination chart ==
Contestants	Round 1 (Top 20)	Round 2 (Top 12)	Round 3 (Top 5)	Round 4 (Top 3)
Hera Chan	Advance	Advance	Advance	Champion
Amber Tang	Advance	Advance	Advance	1st runner-up
Sara Ting	Advance	Advance	Advance	2nd runner-up
Honey Ho	Advance	Advance	Advance	Eliminated
Tania Chan	Advance	Advance	Advance	Eliminated
Kathy Chong	Advance	Advance	Eliminated	
Jenny Leung	Advance	Advance	Eliminated	
Venus Tang	Advance	Advance	Eliminated	
Stephanie Lee	Advance	Advance	Eliminated	
Samantha Li	Advance	Advance	Eliminated	
Rachel Wong	Advance	Advance	Eliminated	
Kelly Ko	Advance	Advance	Eliminated	
Grace Lan	Advance	Eliminated		
Krystl Kung	Advance	Eliminated		
Olivia To	Advance	Eliminated		
Claudia Chan	Advance	Eliminated		
Yutori Kudo	Advance	Eliminated		
Christy Tung	Advance	Eliminated		
Linsy Lai	Advance	Eliminated		
Krystal Yang	Advance	Eliminated		

== Judges ==
Miss Photogenic Judges:

- Grace Chan, Miss Chinese International 2014; Miss Hong Kong 2013
- Selena Li, Miss Hong Kong Pageant 2003 Miss Photogenic
- Kristal Tin (田蕊妮)
- Lai Lok-yi (黎諾懿)

== Post-Pageant Notes ==
- Hera Chan was crowned Miss Chinese International 2019 in Hong Kong.
