= Frank Baumgartner =

American political scientist

Frank Baumgartner is an American political scientist, currently the Richard J. Richardson Distinguished Professor at the University of North Carolina at Chapel Hill and formerly the Distinguished Professor and Bruce R. Miller and Dean D. LaVigne Professor at Penn State University. He received all of his academic degrees at the University of Michigan (BA 1980, MA 1983, PhD 1986).
