= Amber Galloway =

American Sign Language interpreter

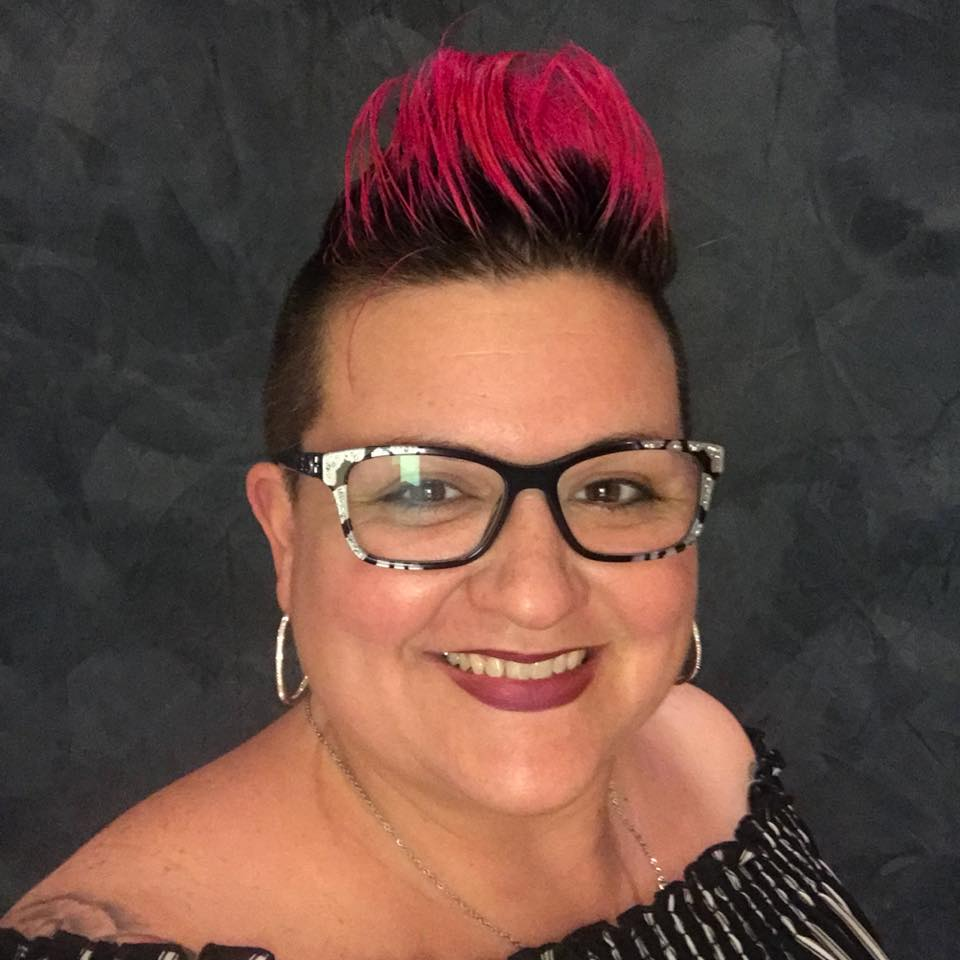
- Born: March 12, 1977 (age 49); San Antonio, Texas, United States
- Other name: Amber Galloway Gallego
- Education: San Antonio College (B.A., M.A.)
- Occupation: American Sign Language interpreter specializing in songs
- Known for: High-profile sign language interpretations and Deaf activism
- Notable work: Interpretation of Kendrick Lamar's "Fuckin' Problems"

Amber Galloway (born 12 March 1977) is a sign language interpreter specializing in the interpretation of concerts and music festivals, especially rap/hip-hop, into American Sign Language (ASL). She has been described as "..the most recognizable sign language interpreter in the [United States]."

== Biography ==
=== Early life ===
Galloway was born in San Antonio, Texas, and currently lives in Austin, Texas. She is a lesbian. While Galloway is not Deaf herself, she is hard of hearing and has been surrounded by members of the Deaf community since the age of five. Among her Deaf and hard of hearing acquaintances in early childhood were her father's girlfriend's son and the two children of her babysitter. In high school, she was friends with a Deaf football player she later married. They had three sons together and fostered a Deaf son.

As a child, Galloway wanted to become a rapper, and as a young adult she wanted to become a physical therapist, but a Deaf guidance counselor at her university, San Antonio College (SAC), pushed her to pursue sign language interpretation. While initially skeptical, after attending one semester at the school's ASL interpretation degree program, she committed to it and graduated from SAC with an Associate of Arts degree in interpreting for the Deaf in 2000. In 2008 she graduated with her bachelor's degree in psychology and then went on to earn a master's degree in ASL/English Interpretation. She interpreted her first live concert in 2001. In 2005, she moved to Houston.

=== Lollapalooza viral video ===
External videos
- How sign language innovators are bringing music to the deaf, Interview with Galloway Gallego (2017)
- Sign language interpreter for Kendrick Lamar - "Fuckin Problems" At Lollapalooza The original "viral video" which brought Galloway Gallego mainstream attention

A handheld video from the crowd of Galloway interpreting A$AP Rocky's "Fuckin' Problems" (performed by Kendrick Lamar) at Lollapalooza in 2013 became a viral video hit when uploaded to YouTube. Although she had been interpreting at concerts since 2000, the video brought the issue of the accessibility of music to mainstream attention. After the video became popular, Galloway made an appearance on Jimmy Kimmel Live! with Wiz Khalifa. She has since interpreted on stage for over 400 artists such as the Red Hot Chili Peppers and Snoop Dogg.

=== Post-viral video ===
Galloway's hearing loss is progressive, and she expects to go completely Deaf in the future, which is one motivation for her work. Currently, she uses hearing aids and lipreading along with ASL to aid in communication. When not interpreting, she teaches sign language at Houston Community College (HCC). She also owns a company, Amber G Productions, which provides interpreters for concerts and other venues. Her interpretations have been described as being in high demand among concert organizers and artists.

=== Personal life ===
In 2011, she married a professor of psychology and took on the name Amber Galloway-Gallego. The couple divorced in 2019. In 2024, she married her partner Amy and reverted to her maiden name. Galloway has her own YouTube Channel where she has over 66k subscribers. On March 4, 2018, Galloway's son Elijah Goertz tragically died at the age of 22. A video was posted by Galloway to her YouTube channel titled "Elijah's Memorial Video".

== Style ==
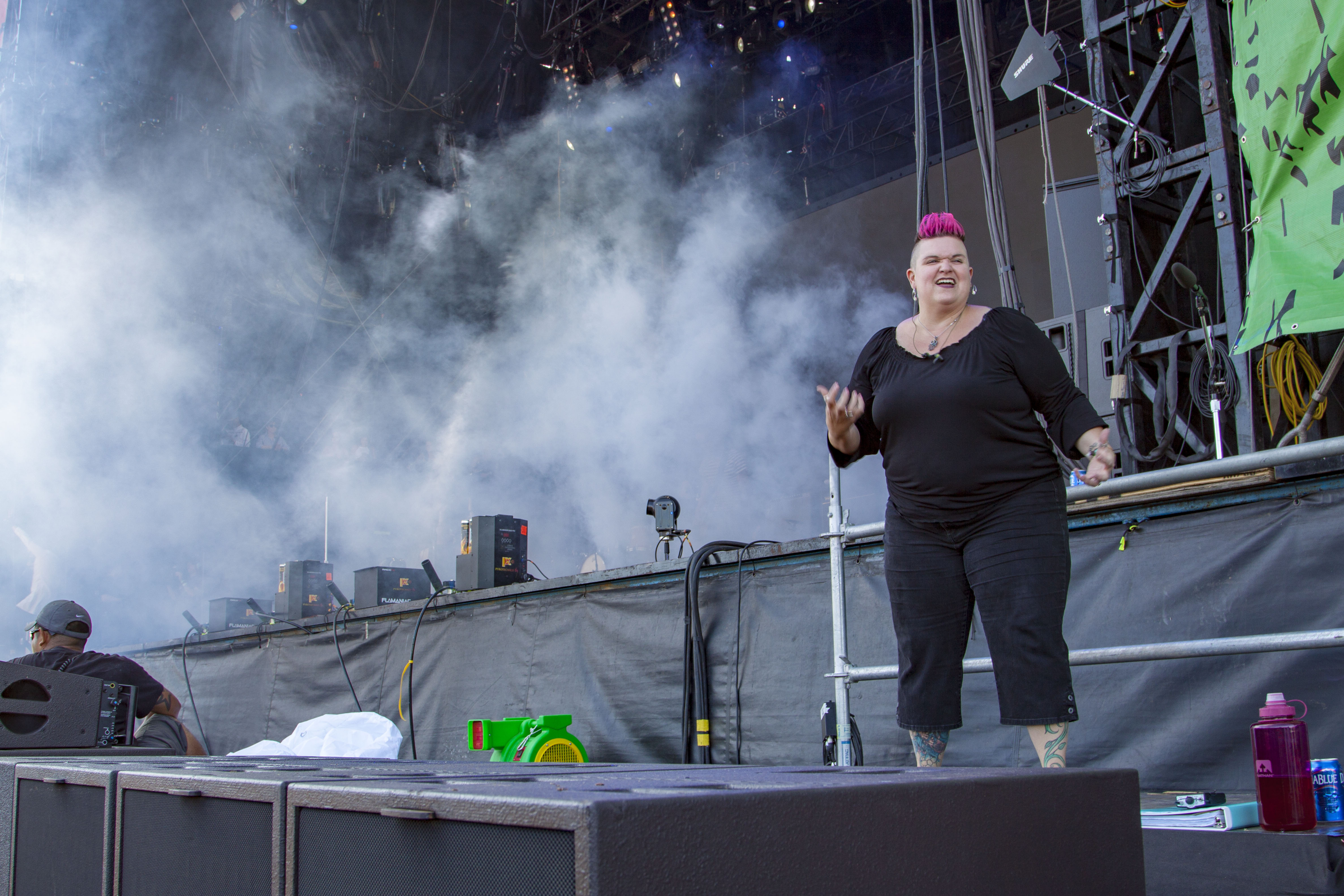
Amber Galloway @ACL 2016

Galloway's interpretation style incorporates nonmanual markers (such as facial expressions and body language), thorough research into the meaning of the song and the intentions of the artist, and dance. Because ASL is a distinct language from English with its own grammar and syntax, Galloway first must translate each song into ASL, a process which can take hours. As such, her interpretations are not word-for-word versions of the interpreted song's lyrics. For some particularly fast-paced songs, such as Eminem's "Rap God", Galloway will sign more rapidly and use shorthand.

When she is hired to interpret at a music festival, she has to memorize the lyrics of 150 songs or more at a time.

While an untrained eye might mistake her interpretations for pantomime, Galloway's performances are all grammatically correct ASL. She was partly inspired to interpret music for the Deaf after hosting gatherings at her house attended by many of her Deaf friends who watched her interpret music and encouraged her to do so professionally. In an interview with the Houston Chronicle, Galloway noted that all of her interpretations are uncensored, and she does not feel uncomfortable signing "raunchy" lyrics as they are not her words. In an interview with MTV, she described her style and motivations thus:

Music is more than words, and the problem is that the interpreters, for a long time, have just focused on the words -- and not thought about all the other layers that come with it to actually make it equivalent. I show all the instruments, because [deaf people] need to be able to see the riffs. So, it's kind of like using onomatopoeia [but] in sign language.

The Week has described Galloway's style as "language, poetry, and performance all coming through at the same time."

== Activism ==
Besides watching interpretations, completely Deaf people can also feel the vibrations that sound makes, and Galloway is a proponent of music for people of all levels of hearing ability as she views it as a key part of cognitive development.

Galloway has criticized concert venues who only provide closed captioning or opt to hire the lowest salary sign language interpreters who may not be properly certified or who only sign the lyrics of the song to meet the requirements of the Americans with Disabilities Act.

== See also ==
- Holly Maniatty
