= Amber E. Boydstun =

American political scientist and data scientist

- Born: Amber Ellen Boydstun
- Education: St. John's College; Pennsylvania State University
- Scientific career
- Fields: Political science, data science
- Workplaces: University of California, Davis
- Doctoral advisor: Frank Baumgartner
- Website: amber-boydstun.com

Amber Ellen Boydstun is an American political scientist and data scientist. She is a professor and director of graduate studies at the University of California, Davis.

== Life ==
Boydstun was born to Faye Ellen Ashley. Her paternal grandmother Janie Trevarton and her mother Janie Hughes helped maintain a farm and family. Boydstun's maternal grandmother, Marion Ashley (née DeWolf) was a military wife and homemaker. She completed a B.A. in philosophy and mathematics from St. John's College in 1999. Following graduation, she tutored mathematics at the Native American Preparatory School for a semester. She earned a M.A. (2004) and Ph.D. (2008) in political science from the Penn State Graduate School. Her dissertation was titled, How Policy Issues Become Front-Page News. Frank Baumgartner was Boydstun's doctoral advisor.

Boydstun researches the interaction between media and politics. She joined University of California, Davis in 2008 as an assistant professor. She codeveloped a smartphone app for students to react to the 2012 United States presidential debates in real time. Boydstun was promoted to associate professor in 2015 and professor of political science in 2020. She is the director of graduate studies. She is the chief data scientist of the diversity lab.

== Selected works ==
- Baumgartner, Frank R.; Boef, Suzanna L. De; Boydstun, Amber E. (2008). The Decline of the Death Penalty and the Discovery of Innocence. Cambridge University Press. ISBN 978-0-521-88734-2.
- Boydstun, Amber E. (2013). Making the News: Politics, the Media, and Agenda Setting. University of Chicago Press. ISBN 978-0-226-06543-4.
