= Amber S. Boehnlein =

American computer scientist and physicist

- Education: Florida State University
- Known for: Computational Physics
- Scientific career
- Fields: Physics, Computer Science
- Workplaces: Texas A&M University; Fermilab; United States Department of Energy; SLAC National Accelerator Laboratory; Thomas Jefferson National Accelerator Facility
- Thesis: Study of the K+ anti-K0 π- system produced in the reaction anti-p p --> K+ anti-K0 π- + X at 8 GeV/c (1990)
- Doctoral advisor: Vasken Hagopian

Amber S. Boehnlein is a particle physicist, computer scientist, and administrator who has held leadership positions at several United States national laboratories and the United States Department of Energy. She is responsible for the lab's Information Technology Division as well as the IT Systems.

== Education ==
Boehnlein grew up in Germantown, Ohio, where she taught herself how to code in high school. She received her Bachelor of Science degree in physics from Miami University of Ohio in 1984 and her doctorate in physics in 1990 from Florida State University, where Vasken Hagopian was her doctoral advisor.

== Career ==
After completing her PhD, Boehnlein held a postdoctoral position at Texas A&M University from 1991 to 1994. She began working at Fermilab in 1993, where she ultimately managed computing and applications support for the lab's experiments. She was also a member of the Fermilab-based experiment DØ from 1991 to 2013, and she was that experiment's computing and software coordinator from 1999 to 2006. From 2008 to 2011, Boehnlein was program manager for the U.S. Large Hadron Collider Detector Operations program at the U.S. Department of Energy’s Office of High Energy Physics. Boehnlein joined SLAC National Accelerator Laboratory in 2011, where she led the Scientific Computing Applications Division. In 2015, she left SLAC for Jefferson Laboratory, where she became that lab's Chief Information Officer. In 2020, she became head of the lab's new Computational Sciences and Technology Division.
