= Amber Smith (disambiguation) =

Amber Smith may refer to:

- Amber M. Smith, American scientist, Memphis, TN
- Amber Smith (born 1971), American actress
- Amber Smith (band), an indie-rock band from Budapest, Hungary
  - Amber Smith (album), the fifth studio album of the eponymous band
