= Amber Liu =

Amber Liu may refer to:

- Amber Liu (tennis) (born 1984), American tennis player
- Amber Liu (singer) (born 1992), American singer active in South Korea and the US
