= Amber Briggle =

American activist

- Organization: Human Rights Campaign Parents for Transgender Equality National Council
- Known for: Activism for transgender rights PFLAG v. Abbott
- Spouse: Adam Briggle
- Children: 2
- Website: lovetothemax.net

Amber Briggle is an American activist based in Denton, Texas and a founding member of the Human Rights Campaign Parents for Transgender Equality National Council.

Briggle and her husband are named plaintiffs in PFLAG v. Abbott, a lawsuit filed by the American Civil Liberties Union and Lambda Legal in June 2022 on behalf of members of PFLAG and three families that seek to block Texas Department of Family and Protective Services (DFPS) investigations based on a directive by Texas Governor Greg Abbott for DFPS to investigate families with transgender children reported to be receiving gender-affirming health care.

== Biography ==
=== Early activism 2016 - 2021 ===
Briggle began her activist career in April 2016, using Facebook to protest bathroom regulations targeting transgender children and statements made on Facebook by the Denton County Republican-elect Sheriff. She then spoke to news media to promote rights for transgender children, and during a press conference on May 31, invited Lt. Gov. Dan Patrick and Texas Attorney General Ken Paxton to dinner at her home.

On September 1, Paxton and his wife had dinner with Briggle and her family, including her trans son, who had begun his transition during first grade. After the dinner, the Human Rights Campaign invited Briggle to become a founding member of the Parents for Transgender Equality National Council, and she eventually became the national co-chair of the council. In December, Briggle and her family were invited to the White House to watch Rogue One: A Star Wars Story.

In March 2017, Briggle and her son participated in Trans Texas Lobby Day, with her son meeting lawmakers as part of a campaign in opposition to a proposed bill to prevent children from using a bathroom matching their gender identity. A San Antonio Express-News photographer took a picture of her son, age nine at the time and tired after the day, sitting on the floor and crying while Briggle comforted him. Briggle posted the picture to Facebook and it became a viral opportunity for her to continue to speak out on behalf of trans children. The proposed bathroom bill was not passed by the legislature.

In July 2019, Briggle participated in an open community discussion at the City Council Chambers in Denton City Hall that was organized by a member of the city council on the topic of the need for a local ordinance with legal protections for LGBTQ people. In November 2019, she spoke with ABC News about Paxton calling for a Texas Department of Family and Protective Services investigation of another family with a transgender child, stating, "After meeting a mother like me, meeting me in my home, meeting my child, breaking bread at my table, engaging with my children, and then acting like family's like mine should not exist, it's infuriating."

In April 2021, Briggle testified before the Texas Senate Committee on State Affairs against two proposed bills, one to expand the definition of "abuse" to include parents who obtain gender-affirming medical treatments and procedures for their children, with criminal and civil penalties, and the other to restrict liability insurance coverage and create a felony offense for doctors prescribing treatment or performing procedures.

During her testimony, she explained gender-affirming surgeries are not performed on minor children, and stated, "If this bill becomes law, that, senators, is child abuse, and I promise I will call every single one of you every time a transgender child dies from suicide to remind you that their lives could have been saved, but you chose not to." After her testimony, she told NBC News her family would consider moving out of Texas to protect their child.

In May 2021, Briggle spoke out against efforts in the Texas Legislature to pass a bill to prevent trans children from participating on sports teams that match their gender identity. She also spoke with The 19th about her work as part of a national advocacy network of parents of trans children and the challenges of trying to find a state to relocate to that is safe for trans children and their families.

In November 2021, with the help of her church and a local brewery, Briggle organized a book reading for children after a "Rainbow Storytime" scheduled for the Trans Day of Remembrance at the local public library was canceled due to threats of violence. The book reading organized by Briggle featured stories with transgender themes. Hundreds of people attended, including a small group of protesters and police serving as protection.

=== 2022 - present ===
"Raising a transgender child in Texas has been one long political emergency."

— Amber Briggle, March 8, 2022

On February 24, 2022, Briggle spoke out against the efforts of Texas Governor Greg Abbott and Texas Attorney General Ken Paxton to describe gender-affirming medical treatments for children as child abuse and the directive from Abbott for the Texas Department of Family and Protective Services (DFPS) to investigate families with transgender children who were reported to be receiving such medical treatment.

According to her attorney, DFPS began an investigation into the Briggle family on February 24, the day after Paxton wrote a legal opinion that characterized gender-affirming treatments as child abuse. On February 28, Briggle was notified that DFPS had opened an investigation into her family. After the Briggles consulted with an attorney, their home was visited two days later by a caseworker who interviewed their children.

On March 8, Briggle wrote on her website in a post about the investigation, "Raising a transgender child in Texas has been one long political emergency." On March 11, a Texas District Court issued a temporary injunction, which temporarily stopped the state investigations into families who provide gender-affirming medical care for their children, and scheduled a trial for July 11, 2022. Texas Attorney General Ken Paxton appealed the trial court decision, and it was upheld at the Third District Court of Appeals of Texas.

At the 33rd GLAAD Media Awards in April 2022, Briggle gave a speech onstage about the experience of her family after the Abbott directive. On May 13, 2022, the Texas Supreme Court removed the broad injunction against DFPS investigations and applied it only to the family leading the lawsuit during the appeal process; the court said DFPS investigations could otherwise continue, and that the directive from Abbott cited no legal authority and was not legally binding on DFPS.

On June 8, in a case titled PFLAG v. Abbott, the American Civil Liberties Union and Lambda Legal filed a lawsuit on behalf of the Parents, Families, and Friends of Lesbians and Gays organization (now known as PFLAG) and three families, including the Briggles, to block investigations under the Abbott directive into their families as well as members of PFLAG.

The Travis County District Court issued a temporary restraining order against investigations based on the directive, pending further court proceedings, for the lead plaintiff families and members of PFLAG on June 10. During the June 10 hearing, a plaintiffs' attorney noted the state had closed the investigation into the Briggles and found no child abuse.

In a July 8 court order, the Travis County judge described the DFPS investigations as "gross invasions of privacy" and issued a temporary injunction that blocked the pending investigations into the other two families named in the lawsuit, while reserving the issues of further relief for PFLAG members and the Briggles for a later decision. Texas Attorney General Ken Paxton filed an appeal. The Travis County court extended the temporary injunction to include DFPS investigations of PLFAG members and the Briggles based on the directive on September 16, and Attorney General Paxton filed an immediate appeal. The injunctions blocking investigations of the parties based on the directive continue during the appeal.

Briggle, her husband, and her children attended a rally for equality hosted by LGBTQ organizations in Austin, Texas on March 20, 2023, and attempted to meet with Texas House Speaker Dade Phelan; Briggle has also continued to use social media for advocacy related to gender-affirming health care. As of April 2023, the Briggles are the only family, of at least 15 families, investigated by DFPS pursuant to the Abbott directive to have publicly identified themselves.

== Political career ==
Briggle was a candidate for Denton City Council in 2015, and lost to Kathleen Wazny with 31% of the vote. In January 2022, she declared her candidacy for the at-large seat on the Denton City Council. In the election on May 7, 2022, Briggle received 7,503 votes and lost to Chris Watts, who received 7,963 votes.

== Personal life ==
Briggle is the owner of a massage studio and is married to Adam Briggle, who is a tenured professor of philosophy at the University of North Texas. They have two children.
