= Amber Rose Kandarian =

Armenian-American filmmaker

Amber Rose Kandarian (Ամբեր Ռոուզ Կանդարյան; born 1982) is an Armenian-American filmmaker, founder of Impact International Pictures. Kandarian is a graduate of the University of California, Irvine and video/multimedia artist scholar at Seven Degrees in Laguna Beach.

Kandarian was one of the first ArtsBridge scholars in the Picturing Peace project.

== Career ==
Kandarian founded her production company Impact International Pictures in 2003. She sold yachts to raise capital for the company. In 2010 Kandarian added three documentary divisions. The first was DocuThesis, a hybrid between documentary and graduate research that allows university students and professors to share research. The second was DocuCaseStudy for written case studies. The third division was called DocuInc, assisting companies film documentaries.

In 2005, Kandarian traveled to New Zealand to edit TVNZ's The Rookie on Studio Two with Taylormade Media. During this time, she won the award for best cinematography at the New Zealand 48-Hour Short Film Festival for her mockumentary Bruised Gold, about the dangers of a fictional drug derived from bananas, later shown on the C4 television network.

In 2006 Kandarian went to Armenia to assist in the BBC production of A Story of People in War and Peace. During this trip she screened a series of contemporary art videos at the Armenian Center for Contemporary Experimental Art (ACCEA/NPAK).

In 2012, Kandarian produced and directed the feature documentary Respect the Doc, a feature-length documentary about documentary filmmakers and how they can shift culture. This film had a theatrical release in California and Sydney. Kandarian also taught courses on documentary filmmaking at the Sydney Film School.
