= Blenders Eyewear =

American eyewear brand

- Company type: Private
- Industry: Eyewear
- Founded: 2012; 13 years ago
- Founder: Chase Fisher
- Headquarters: California
- Parent: Safilo
- Website: www.blenderseyewear.com

Blenders Eyewear is an American eyewear brand headquartered in California.

== Overview ==
Blenders Eyewear was founded in 2012 by Chase Fisher in San Diego, California, and produces sunglasses and snow goggles for men and women.

In December 2019, an Italian eyewear company, the Safilo Group, acquired 70% of the company, valued at $90 million.

Blenders partnered with the CU Athletics coach Deion Sanders on a line of custom sunglasses. A rival football coach Jay Norvell from Colorado State University criticized Sanders for not taking off his hat and sunglasses when he talked, which resulted in $1.2 million in sales on a single day amid comments made by the Colorado State coach.

Blenders also partnered with Oracle Red Bull Racing and launched a collection of eyewear in 2022.
