= Amber Marshall =

Amber Marshall may refer to:

- Amber Marshall (actress) (born 1988), Canadian actress, singer, and equestrian
- Amber Marshall (soccer) (born 1999), American soccer player
- Amber Marshall (tennis) (born 2001), Australian tennis player
