= Amber Kirk-Ford =

British blogger and vlogger

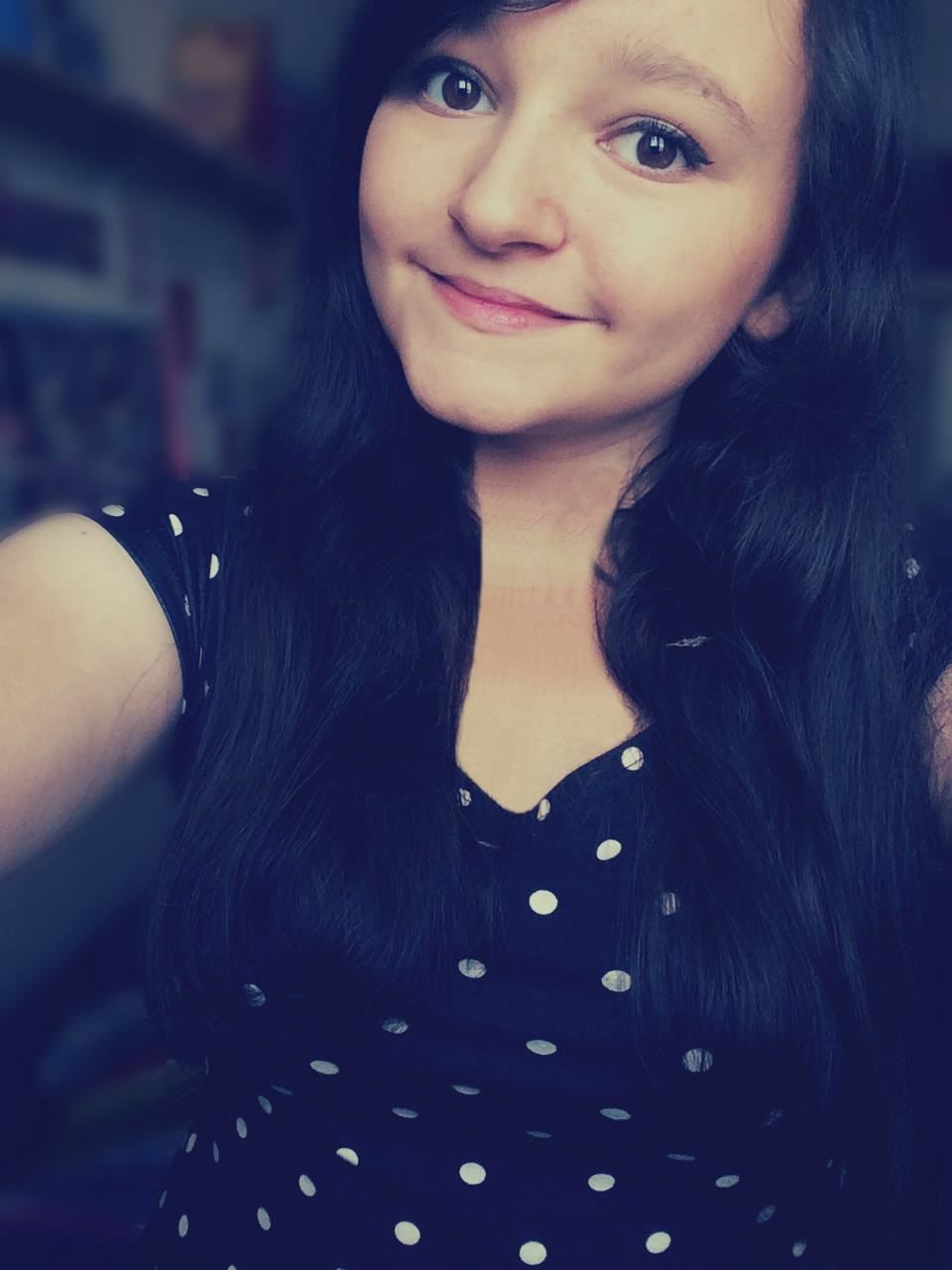
- Born: 28 October 1998 (age 27); Norfolk, England, UK
- Occupations: Columnist, blogger, vlogger
- Years active: 2006–2017
- Website: Amber Kirk-Ford

Amber Kirk-Ford (born 28 October 1998) is a British former blogger and vlogger from Norfolk. She began blogging at the age of seven.

== Personal life ==
Amber Kirk-Ford was born and raised in Norfolk, England. She was home-schooled from the ages of seven to eleven, and again from the age of fourteen. Kirk-Ford originally started blogging to document her day-to-day life. She later decided to focus on book reviews, discussions, and author interviews, with the occasional blog post about her personal life.

She attended King's InterHigh from 2013 to 2017 and studied English Literature and Media Studies at A Level. She started a campaign in August 2015 to raise the funds needed to enrol at A Level, and the campaign made global press.

== Blog ==
Kirk-Ford first created her current blog, originally called "Let's Call it a Journey", in April 2006. This was renamed to "The Mile Long Bookshelf" in 2009, and became self-titled in 2018. She originally gained a following from writing about her life as a home-schooled child, but later transformed her blog into a book blog after starting at her local secondary school, and then decided to write about "life, books, food and travel." The Guardian named her one of the "top 10 best books bloggers" in December 2014.

In June 2016, Kirk-Ford was involved in Instagram's #MyStoryUK exhibition in London, which showcased 24 women using their social media platforms for good. She was later named one of the "most inspiring women on Instagram" by Stylist Magazine and one of the "secret ... British stars of Instagram" in an article by BBC Newsbeat.

== YouTube ==
Kirk-Ford created a YouTube channel, "The Mile Long Bookshelf", to run alongside her blog in July 2013, and was between Tyler Oakley and Joe Sugg in Huffington Post's "25 Vloggers Under 25 Owning the World of YouTube" in December 2014. Originally posting short skits, she later added book hauls, discussions and giveaways for her subscribers, and occasionally works with brands and book publishers.

Her YouTube channel had over 2,000 subscribers and over 100,000 views in May 2015.

== Awards and nominations ==
Kirk-Ford won "Trending Blogger" in the 2013 Bloggy Awards. She went on to win "Best Blogger" in the inaugural Future8 Awards 2014. The following year, she was nominated in two categories in the 2015 UKYA Blogger Awards and won "Champion Teen Blogger".

== Published works ==
Outside of blogging, Kirk-Ford has been a columnist for her local newspaper, and regularly writes for publications such as The Guardian, Teen Breathe magazine, and the Penguin Books blog.

Kirk-Ford contributed to Rife: 21 Stories from Britain's Youth edited by Nikesh Shukla and Sammy Jones, and published in July 2019 by Unbound.

She has been quoted in The Bookseller, Shout (magazine) and We Heart Pop as well as newspapers such as The Guardian. Her reviews have been quoted in books such as The Year of the Rat by Clare Furniss, Lola and the Boy Next Door by Stephanie Perkins, Isla and the Happily Ever After by Stephanie Perkins, Chocolate SOS by Sue Limb, Diary of a Mall Girl by Luisa Plaja, Maresi by Maria Turtschaninoff, The Boy Who Sailed the Ocean in an Armchair by Lara Williamson, How Not to Disappear by Clare Furniss, and Finding Your Inner Cherokee by Siobhan Curham. The Mile Long Bookshelf has also been used as a case study in The Quick Expert's Guide to Writing a Blog.
