= Amber Fallon =

American horror writer and editor

- Born: Amber Lynn Day; New Mexico, USA
- Writing career
- Pen name: Alyn Day

Amber Fallon (pen name, Alyn Day; born October 7, 1983) is an American editor and a writer of horror stories and novels.

== Biography ==
Amber Fallon was born Amber Lynn Day in New Mexico. She grew up in several places due to the military postings of her parents.

She lives near Boston, Massachusetts where she works as a software engineer in the tech industry. Fallon is married with children.

== Horror ==
Fallon read horror as childhood bedtime stories and has written and worked in horror since. Fallon began writing in the genre in both long and short form. Recognizing a gap where women's work was not included in anthologies, she went on to edit the horror anthology Fright Into Flight. Fallon began publishing as "Alyn Day", a version of her real name. She has described her work as junk-food horror.

== Bibliography ==
Anthologies

- Fright Into Flight (2018)
- Wicked Weird: An Anthology of the New England Horror Writers (2019), with Scott T. Goudsward and David Price

Novellas

- The Terminal (2016)
- The Warblers (2017)

Short Fiction

- Seven Eight One Five Four (2012) [also as Alyn Day]
- Of the Dead (2014) [also as Alyn Day]
- Ornamentation (2014) [as Alyn Day]
- The Terminal (2015)
- Demolition Derby (2017)
- Angels' Armageddon (2017)
- The Warblers (2017)
- Tell Me How You Die (2017)
- Lamprey Luau (2017)
- Clickbusters (2018)
- The Day of the Dead (2018)
- The Tones (2018)
