= Amber K =

American writer

Amber K (born 9 July 1947 in Bronxville, New York) is an author of books about magick, Wicca and Neopaganism, and a third-degree priestess of the Wiccan faith. She was initiated at the Temple of the Pagan Way in Chicago, Illinois, and served on the council of elders there, and has taught the craft throughout the United States for over 30 years. She has served as national first officer of the Covenant of the Goddess for three terms, and is a founder of Our Lady of the Woods and the Ladywood Tradition of Wicca. She has worked with various Neopagan organizations such as Circle Sanctuary and the Re-Formed Congregation of the Goddess, and is a Grey Council member of the online Grey School of Wizardry founded by Oberon Zell Ravenheart in 2004. She is the executive director of Ardantane, a non-profit Wiccan and pagan school and seminary in northern New Mexico.

== Family ==
K spent most her childhood growing up in Chicago. Her father was a Roman Catholic and her mother Episcopalian, and she attended each on alternate Sundays. After completing her formal education, Amber attended Colorado State University in Fort Collins and graduated in 1970 with a BSc. degree in social sciences.

== Paganism and Wicca ==
In 1978, she joined the Temple of the Pagan Way in Chicago, and received her initiation and ordination there. The Pagan Way was formed in the early 1970s in response to the high demand of people wishing to join established covens, and in this they provided an alternative to the intensive screening programs and year-and-a-day probationary periods required by traditional covens. After joining and advancing through four of their five degrees, in 1980 K moved to Wisconsin with her then-partner Catelaine, and was later ordained a Wiccan high oriestess in a separate ritual.

Moving to Wisconsin, K worked first with the Pool of Bast and then with New Earth Circle before cofounding, with Catelaine, the Coven of Our Lady of the Woods in 1982. The coven thrived for a while in Wisconsin but is now located in Los Alamos, New Mexico, where it is incorporated as a church. Since then a number of covens have hived off and evolved into the Ladywood Tradition of Wicca. Ladywood covens are mainly initiatory teaching covens and provide an eclectic mix of training drawn from various Pagan traditions, including the provision of Wicca 101 courses. Covens celebrate the esbats (full moon celebrations) and sabbats (seasonal celebrations), which are generally open in their efforts to educate the general public about the Craft. She has worked with Circle, New Earth Circle, and the Pool of Bast, and helped found the Coven of Our Lady of the Woods and the Ladywood Tradition of Wicca. She has served as publications officer and national first officer of the Covenant of the Goddess, and taught in the cella (priestess) training program of RCG, a national Dianic network.

== Bibliography ==
- True Magick: A Beginner's Guide (1991) Llewellyn Publications ISBN 0-87542-003-6, ISBN 978-0-87542-003-5
- Covencraft: Witchcraft for Three or More (1998) Llewellyn Publications ISBN 1-56718-018-3, ISBN 978-1-56718-018-3
- Pagan Kids' Activity Book (1998) Horned Owl Publishing ISBN 0-9696066-9-9, ISBN 978-0-9696066-9-7
- Preámbulo a la Magia (1999) Llewellyn Espanol ISBN 1-56718-019-1, ISBN 978-1-56718-019-0
- Candlemas: Feast of Flames (2001) Llewellyn Publications ISBN 0-7387-0079-7, ISBN 978-0-7387-0079-3
- Heart of Tarot: An Intuitive Approach (2002) Llewellyn Publications ISBN 1-56718-008-6, ISBN 978-1-56718-008-4
- RitualCraft: Creating Rites for Transformation and Celebration (with Azrael Arynn K) (2006) Llewellyn Publications ISBN 1-56718-009-4, ISBN 978-1-56718-009-1
