= Richard J. Richardson =

American political scientist

Richard J. "Dick" Richardson is an American former political scientist, holding the Burton Craig Professorship at University of North Carolina at Chapel Hill.

== Education ==
Born in Missouri, Dick Richardson received his undergraduate degree from Arkansas’ Harding College in 1957 and his graduate degrees in political science from Tulane University

== Career ==
He taught at Tulane, Western Michigan University, and the University of Hawaii before joining the faculty of the University of North Carolina at Chapel Hill in 1969. Richardson specialized in the study of the judiciary his Politics of American Democracy, co-authored with Marian Irish and James Prothro, was for a generation the nation's most widely adopted college textbook in American politics. A popular teacher and raconteur, he served as chair of his department from 1975 to 1980 and chaired the university's bicentennial observance in the early 1990s. From 1995 to 2000, Richardson was provost and vice chancellor for academic affairs.

== Honors and recognition ==
In addition to his many teaching awards, Richardson won the Thomas Jefferson Award in 1987, presented annually to “that member of the academic community who through personal influence and performance of duty in teaching, writing, and scholarship has best exemplified the ideals and objectives of Thomas Jefferson,” whose complex legacy includes the values of democracy, public service, and the pursuit of knowledge. He also won The C. Knox Massey Distinguished Service Award in 2000 which recognizes a University of North Carolina at Chapel Hill employees e for unusual, meritorious or superior contributions.

In 2001, Richardson won the UNC General Alumni Association Distinguished Service Medal. The citation described him as "the heartbeat of academic Carolina," and noted that "he served as provost with compassion, wit, and a refreshing frankness."

Richardson was awarded the highest honor made by the University Board of Trustees in 2005, the William Richardson Davie Award and the university created a professorship in his name, The Richardson Professorship.
