= Stephanie Lee (born 1993) =

Hong Kong actress and programme host

- 李芷晴
- Lee in September 2026
- Born: February 6, 1993 (age 33); British Hong Kong
- Education: Bachelor of Fine Arts, Chinese University of Hong Kong
- Alma mater: Chinese University of Hong Kong

Stephanie Lee Tsz-ching (born February 6, 1993) is a Hong Kong actress and television presenter. She was the first runner-up and winner of the Most Improved Performer Award in the Miss Hong Kong Pageant - The Comeback and was among the top 12 in the 2018 Miss Hong Kong Pageant. She is currently an artist under TVB's management contract.

== Background ==
=== Early life ===
Lee attended Good Counsel Catholic Primary School and Our Lady of the Rosary College in her early years. She later transferred to Rosaryhill School to complete her Hong Kong Advanced Level Examination (HKALE) course, where she was classmates with Christine Chu Fei-fei, who was also an artist with TVB. After graduating from Form 7 at Rosaryhill School in 2012, she first pursued an Associate of Design (Visual Communication Design) program at the Hong Kong Institute of Post-secondary Education, Hung Hom. In 2014, she continued her studies for two years at the Department of Fine Arts, New Asia College, The Chinese University of Hong Kong, via a bridging program. In 2015, she created tabletop games and animated teaching materials for primary school students for the MTR Corporation, and held an art exhibition at the Art Museum of The Chinese University of Hong Kong during her time at the university. After graduating in 2017, she worked as a designer and visual arts instructor.
