= Amber Share =

American author and illustrator

Amber Share is an American author and illustrator based in North Carolina. Her 2021 book, Subpar Parks is based on her drawings about the one star reviews some American National Parks received. The project on which the book is based began in 2019 and had more than 300,000 followers as of 2021. The book pairs her illustrations with some basic facts on the parks, her opinion on the critical review and the occasional input and tips from Park rangers. In 2024, a follow-up book, Subpar Planet, was announced, which catalogs one-star reviews for parks and tourist sites around the globe.
