= Amber Lynn (disambiguation) =

Amber Lynn (born 1964) is a pornographic actress.

Amber Lynn may also refer to:

- "Amber Lynn" (song), a 2011 rock song by Mayday Parade
- Amber Lynn Walker, stuntwoman
- Amber Lynn Coplin, murder victim
