= Holly Maniatty =

American Sign Language interpreter

- Education: Rochester Institute of Technology; University of Rochester
- Occupation: ASL interpreting

Holly Maniatty is an American interpreter of American Sign Language known for her performances at hip-hop concerts. She has interpreted for artists such as the Wu-Tang Clan, Killer Mike, Eminem, and the Beastie Boys, and has performed multiple times at Bonnaroo.

== Biography ==
Holly Maniatty grew up in Newport, Vermont. She graduated from the Rochester Institute of Technology's American Sign Language program before getting an undergraduate degree from the University of Rochester in 2008. While in college, she was exposed to hip-hop music, becoming a fan of the Wu-Tang Clan and the Beastie Boys.

While working for an interpretation company based in Rochester, New York, she interpreted at a Marilyn Manson concert, which was her first time interpreting at a concert. She was later put in contact with Everyone's Invited, a company that hires ASL interpreters for concerts. Through Everyone's Invited, she worked at the New Orleans Jazz & Heritage Festival and Bonnaroo. She interpreted for the Beastie Boys at the 2009 Bonnaroo, in what became their final live performance as a trio. To prepare for the show, she spent over 100 hours studying the Beastie Boys and memorizing their lyrics. She also studies regional dialects of ASL for her performances, as different regions use different words. Maniatty holds a first-degree black belt in Taekwondo and uses her body to add impact to her performances. She studies the body language of artists that she interprets for in order to create a more authentic experience for deaf concertgoers.

When interpreting a Killer Mike concert in 2013, the artist was impressed by her signing and jumped off the stage to dance with her. Her skill in interpretation has gained her popularity, and she has appeared on Late Night with Jimmy Fallon and Jimmy Kimmel Live!. Also in 2013, a video of Maniatty interpreting for the Wu-Tang Clan at Bonnaroo went viral online. At the performance, Method Man came down from the stage to give Maniatty a hug. She went viral online again in 2017 after interpreting for Snoop Dogg, and once again in 2018 when she interpreted for Eminem at that year's Firefly Music Festival.
