= Amber Musser =

English professor

Amber Jamilla Musser is an English professor at the CUNY Graduate Center. Previously, Musser was Associate Professor of Women, Gender, and Sexuality Studies at Washington University in St. Louis.

== Early life and education ==
From the University of Oxford, Musser has a MSt in Women's Studies and her Ph.D. from Harvard University is in the History of Science. She has had fellowships at the Pembroke Center for Teaching and Research on Women at Brown University and at the New York University Draper Program in Gender Studies.

== Career ==
Musser joined the CUNY staff in the fall semester of 2021. Musser was also an American Studies professor at George Washington University.

In the Arts and Sciences at Washington University in St. Louis, where she started in 2013, Musser taught in the Women, Gender and Sexuality Studies Department, the Performing Arts Department and the American Cultural Studies Program.

== Publications ==
- monograph Sensational Flesh: Race, Power, and Masochism (NYU Press, 2014)
- Sensual Excess: Queer Femininity and Brown Jouissance
- Tear and the Politics of Brown Feelings
