= Amberley (given name) =

Amberley is a feminine given name. As a given name, it is considered a variant of the name Amber, with a sound pattern influenced by the popular name Kimberly. The surname might be derived from a combination of amer, an Old English word meaning bunting, combined with the Old English lēah, meaning clearing.

Notable people with the name include:

- Amberley Lobo (born 1990), Australian television presenter
- Amberley Snyder (born 1991), American barrel racer and motivational speaker
