= Amber Brock =

American author (born 1980)

- Born: January 14, 1980 (age 46)
- Occupation: Author

Amber Brock (born January 14, 1980) is an American author known for her debut novel, A Fine Imitation and her follow-up Lady Be Good. She also teaches English, Spanish, and Creative Writing at The Atlanta Girls' School.

== Reception ==
A Fine Imitation is Amber Brock's debut novel. Before its release, A Fine Imitation was featured in Atlanta Magazine, Harper's Bazaar, and People Magazine. After its release, A Fine Imitation was also featured in The Skimm.

Kirkus Reviews said of the characters in the book, "Brock sketches a hazy outline of 1920s high society as seen through the eyes of a woman who would be free from its hollow promises. Somehow her main character wallows in indecision, even as circumstances allow for the possibility of personal growth and reinvention."

Jo Haraf from Historical Novel Society wrote, "Brock’s introspective characters, satisfying sub-plots, and unexpected—but justified—twists elevate the novel from a period romance to a suspenseful peek inside high society’s gilded cage."
