= Amber Dermont =

American author

- Education: Vassar College (AB); Iowa Writers' Workshop (MFA); University of Houston (PhD)
- Occupations: Writer, Associate Professor of English

Amber Dermont is an American author. She has a bachelor's degree from Vassar College, an MFA in fiction from the Iowa Writers' Workshop and a Ph.D. in Creative Writing and Literature from the University of Houston, and she is a faculty member at Rice University.

== The Starboard Sea (2012) ==
The Starboard Sea was published January 1, 2012 by St. Martin's Press. The novel follows a boy who transfers to a new prep school after a tragedy involving his sailing partner.

The novel was a New York Times best seller and was named one of The New York Times' 100 Notable Books of 2012. It was also a Waterstones book club pick, as well as a Watermark Books best seller.

The Starboard Sea was a finalist for the 2014 Townsend Prize for Fiction.

== Publications ==
- The Starboard Sea. St. Martin's Press. 2012. ISBN 9780312642808.
- Damage Control: Stories. St. Martin's Press. 2013. ISBN 9781466834224.
- A Splendid Wife. St. Martin's Press. 2012. ISBN 9781466834224.
