= Murder of Amber Creek =

American murder case

Amber Creek
- Creek in February 1996 (left) compared to an undated photograph after she changed her image while suffering from depression.
- Born: July 2, 1982; Park Ridge, Illinois, U.S.
- Died: February 1997 (aged 14)
- Cause of death: Homicide by asphyxiation
- Body discovered: February 9, 1997; Burlington, Wisconsin, U.S.
- Resting place: Holy Family Cemetery, Caledonia, Wisconsin, U.S.

Amber Gail "Aimee" Creek was an American teenage girl from Palatine, Illinois, who was murdered in February 1997. Creek's body was found in Burlington, Wisconsin, not long after she ran away from a youth shelter. Creek remained unidentified for approximately one year, and it was not until April 2014 that police arrested a suspect, James Eaton, a native of Palatine. Eaton pleaded no contest to a reduced charge of reckless homicide in late 2016.

== Background ==
Amber Gail Creek was born on July 2, 1982, in Park Ridge, Illinois, and was raised in Palatine, Illinois. She was sexually abused at a young age, so she was taken from her mother's care and placed with her father, Robert Creek. She was described as a normal girl by friends and family until mid-1996, at around age 14, when her behavior drastically changed shortly after graduating from eighth grade at junior high school. Creek began to suffer from long periods of depression that had resulted in her using drugs and alcohol, and was described as a frequent runaway.

Creek became a ward of the state in late 1996 and ran away several times before finally leaving a North Side juvenile residential center for good on January 23, 1997. Although she did not disclose her location, she did regularly speak with family members by telephone.

== Disappearance ==
Creek ran away from a juvenile residential center in Chicago on January 23, 1997, and was reported missing. She was last seen alive in February 1997, attending a hotel party with a group of men in Rolling Meadows, Illinois.

== Murder ==
Reconstruction of Creek, created to assist with her identification

On February 9, 1997, Creek's frozen body was discovered by hunters in Karcher Springs State Natural Area, a nature reserve near Burlington, Wisconsin. It had been around two weeks after she had been reported missing, and it was believed she had been murdered at a different location, which has never been identified, and then disposed of at the nature reserve.

Creek was found with a plastic garbage bag around her head, which was used to kill her by asphyxiation. She had been extensively physically abused, including being beaten and raped, slashed in the facial area, and bitten on the neck causing compression which played a role in her death. The word "hi" was written on the girl's palm, which was raised in an upward position. A price tag from a bookstore was observed to have been present on one of her arms. She wore few clothes, as some were likely removed in the process of the assault, including her jacket and backpack containing personal items. Her underwear was later discovered inside of her pants pocket. Her belongings were not found at the scene, and it is possible that the murderer took these as souvenirs. Authorities surmise that Creek may have been murdered by someone that may have received prostitution services from her.

Around one hundred Wisconsin inhabitants attended the then-unidentified victim's funeral where she was buried in a donated casket. Initially, Creek was buried in a grave that read "Jane Doe" due to the fact that her identity was not yet known. She was later reburied and a new headstone was created that bore her name and lifespan.

== Investigation ==
Police reportedly spent thousands of hours comparing DNA, dental records and fingerprints to many different missing person cases. Consequently, her body was not positively identified until June 26, 1998. DNA and dental records helped to confirm the identification. After viewing the television show America's Most Wanted that aired in December 1998, which documented the case, Creek's father had notified police that he suspected that the body belonged to his daughter. When Creek had first vanished, she was not reported missing for five weeks, as her history of running away had prevented investigation. After the identification, laws in the state were changed to prevent an issue like this from happening again.

=== Arrest of James Eaton ===
Comparison of a police sketch and mugshot of James Eaton

In October 2013, an Oklahoma crime lab began re-examining fingerprints taken from scenes of unsolved murders. In February 2014, Creek's case was reopened; examiners in an Oklahoma crime lab were able to match a thumbprint on the garbage bag concealing the body to James Paul Eaton, a 36-year-old divorced man. Eaton was nineteen at the time of the murder and lived in Palatine, Illinois, the same town as Creek. One of the men seen with Amber in early February 1997 bore a strong resemblance to Eaton. Eaton's fingerprints were not on record at the time of the murder; they were recorded only in 2000 after his arrest for possession of drug paraphernalia. Investigators located the suspect in Chicago, and on March 22 they collected discarded cigarette butts to match his DNA to that found at the crime scene. Eaton was arrested in early April and is incarcerated in Racine, Wisconsin. Authorities also looked through his computer, Facebook profile and phone, as well as searching his residence for possible souvenirs from the scene, as some of Amber's belongings had been suspected to have been taken by her killer.

Police attempted to garner a confession from Eaton by showing him images of Creek when she was alive and also by showing pictures of her body after she was found.

Creek's uncle, Anthony Mowers, has expressed that he believes that others may be involved in the murder, particularly in the transportation of Eaton and Amber to Wisconsin, saying she may have believed she was being taken to her grandmother's residence that was located in the state at the time. Police have also stated that they believe there are more who know details about the crime. It has not yet been reported if the bite on the body matched Eaton's dental records, which has also led some to suspect that there have been more responsible for the victim's death. It has been stated that his saliva was found at the scene, but the saliva has not explicitly been reported to have been on the bite area.

=== Trial ===
Eaton's original charges consisted of first-degree murder and concealing a body, which carried a sentence of life in prison. He pleaded not guilty to both charges at his October 2014 arraignment. The trial itself was scheduled to begin in November 2015. His defense attorney stated that they had not been given all of the evidence available in the case, despite strong indication that he played some role in Creek's death. However, the final pretrial conference and trial were later delayed to May 31 and June 6, 2016, respectively, as the defense was attempting to locate an individual to examine the bite mark on Creek's neck as well as the DNA from the scene.

A judge, convinced by Eaton's attorney, eventually ruled that information that was obtained through interrogation of Eaton after his arrest, including his reaction to Amber's photographs, could not be used in court, as police had continued to interrogate him after he requested a lawyer. Police officers did not acknowledge this request until the third time he made it, on April 5, 2014. However, it was ruled that information obtained by police the next day could still be used.

On October 25, 2016, Eaton pleaded no contest to a reduced charge of first-degree reckless homicide. Another unnamed man is under investigation for suspected involvement in the murder. Eaton was sentenced to 40 years with eligibility for parole after ten years.

== See also ==
- List of solved missing person cases: 1950–1999
