= Amber Wadham =

Australian Twitch streamer

Paladin Amber
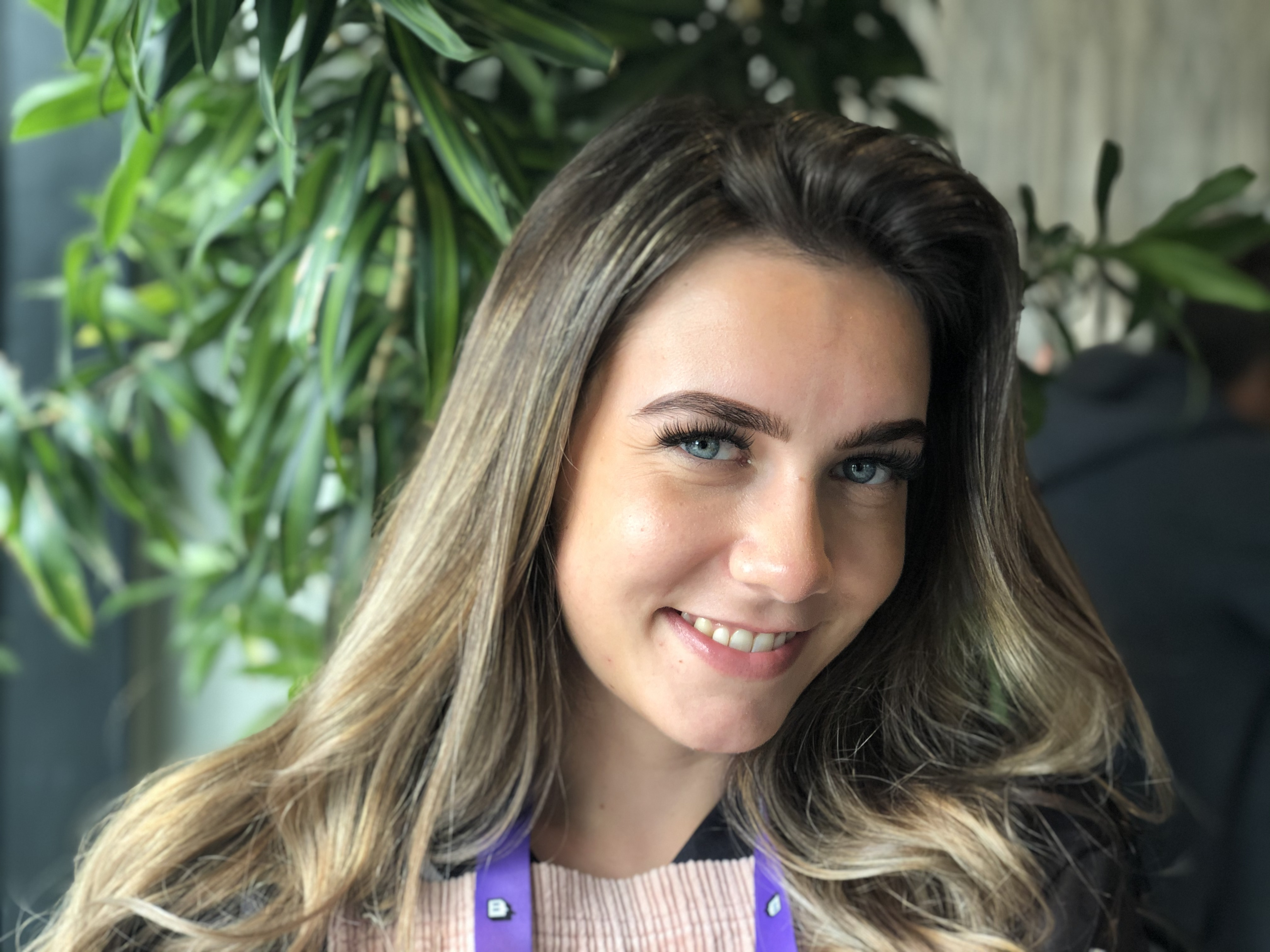
- Wadham in 2019
- Born: Amber Jay Wadham; 1996 (age 29–30); Adelaide, South Australia, Australia
- Other names: Paladin, Amber, Amanda, Tiny, Meme Queen

Twitch information
- Channel: paladinamber
- Genres: Gaming; comedy

Amber Jay Wadham (born 1996), commonly known by her online alias Paladin Amber, is an Australian Twitch streamer and internet personality. She is known for her comedic style for roasting trolls via multi-angle cameras.

== Career ==
Amber commenced Twitch streaming in November 2018 via a PlayStation on her lounge room television; she moved to PC streaming in March 2019, which allowed her to increase her stream production and created a unique experience of '90s style of bad late-night TV for consumers and it was at this point in time she started gaining more traction. In July 2019, her content started going viral, and she gained notoriety for her unique and comical way of handling trolls.

== Accolades ==
In 2019, Amber was nominated for The Advertiser Woman of the Year Awards. She was also nominated for the Golden Joysticks Awards.
