= Penn State Graduate School =

Coordinates: 40.79723°N 77.86848°W

The J. Jeffrey and Ann Marie Fox Graduate School is the university organization in charge of the admission, matriculation and graduation of all graduate students (with the exception of professional students in the College of Medicine and The Dickinson School of Law). In addition to its administrative functions, the Fox Graduate School serves as a main unit that promotes and provides professional development for students to supplement the efforts of graduate programs and colleges. The Fox Graduate School is also in charge of reviewing the quality of graduate degree programs and helping with university-wide strategic planning for graduate education efforts and initiatives.

== History ==
Seed of graduate education at Penn State was planted by Evan Pugh, the first university president. Immediately upon his arrival at Penn State in 1859, Pugh established a research laboratory. Having completed his chemistry doctorate in Germany, at the University of Göttingen, he was heavily influenced by the German academic model and was constantly engaged in scientific experimentation, investigation and publication. As a consequence, first graduate students to earn degrees from Penn State did so under Pugh's guidance in 1863: Alfred Smith (later a professor of chemistry at Penn State) and Augustus King (the son of the president of Columbia University) were awarded the Master of Scientific Agriculture degree. Between 1863 and the establishment of the Graduate School in 1922, almost 900 graduate students engaged in academic study at Penn State. At this time, graduate study was modeled after Pugh's academic experience in Göttingen – it was an independent pursuit, shaped by the individual student's and advisor's interests. No formal graduate classes were offered until the establishment of college-wide standards in the 1890s. At this point, a thesis became a universal requirement for all advanced degrees. In 1922, President John Thomas established the Graduate School under the direction of Dean Frank D. Kern. At that point, the Graduate School made available a small number of graduate teaching assistantships, each with an $800 per year stipend, as well as a fellowship sponsored by the Elliot Company, an electrical engineering firm in Pittsburgh. During the first eight years of the Graduate School's existence, graduate students earned 422 advanced degrees: 15 Ph.D.s, 147 M.A.s, 208 M.S.s, and 52 technical degrees.

Penn State's Graduate School today is one of the largest in the nation with more than 13,000 graduate students enrolled throughout the Penn State system. It caters to diverse graduate student body at Penn State - international enrollment has increased to an all-time high with more than 3,500 international students enrolled.

In 2024, the Board of Trustees approved the renaming of Penn State's Graduate School to its current name after a $20 million donation.

== Leadership ==
Dr. Levon T. Esters is Dean of the Fox Graduate School and Vice Provost for Graduate Education at Penn State. He was named to this role in December 2022 and began his appointment on May 1, 2023. Dr. Esters received his Ph.D. in Agricultural and Extension Education from Penn State.

Dr. Michael Verderame is Senior Associate Dean of the Fox Graduate School and a faculty member in the College of Medicine.

Dr. William Clark is Associate Dean of the Fox Graduate School.

Dr. Stephanie Danette Preston is Associate Dean for Graduate Educational Equity. She also heads the Office of Graduate Educational Equity Programs and is the Chief Diversity Officer for Graduate Education.

Dr. Michelle Corby is the Assistant Dean for Graduate Student Services for the Fox Graduate School.
