= Amber Hunt =

Amber Hunt may refer to:

- Amber Hunt (comics), a fictional character from Malibu Comics' Exiles comic book series
- Amber Hunt (journalist) (born 1978), American journalist, podcaster, and true crime author
