= Amber Ferenz =

American musician, music educator and composer

- Born: 1972 (age 53–54)
- Genres: Classical, contemporary chamber music
- Occupations: Musician, music educator, composer, arranger
- Instruments: Bassoon, violin
- Website: amberferenz.com

Amber Ferenz (born 1972) is an American musician, music educator and composer.

== Life ==
Amber Ferenz graduated with a bachelor's degree in bassoon performance from the North Carolina School of the Arts, and a Master of Fine Arts in orchestral performance from the California Institute of the Arts, and they studied with Mark Popkin, Julie Feves and Steven Dibner. After completing their studies, they worked as a bassoonist, becoming principal bassoonist of the Fayetteville Symphony, and the second bassoonist with the Asheville Symphony. They have also taught bassoon at California Polytechnic State University at San Luis Obispo, California Institute of the Arts, the University of North Carolina at Charlotte, and Wake Forest University.

Ferenz is also a violinist and has been a fellow at the Aspen Music Festival. They are a founding member of the Los Angeles-based chamber music collective inauthentica and have performed with the Open Dream Ensemble.

== Works ==
Ferenz composes mainly for solo bassoon and chamber ensemble. Selected works include:

- Love Medicine
- Unfinished Conversations
- Ice Cream Truck, for bassoon quartet
- Songs for Wicked children
- Los Angeles Sketches, for 4 bassoons
- Ice Cream Truck 2: "Son of Ice Cream Truck", for bassoon quartet
