= Death of Amber Tuccaro =

Disappearance of a Canadian woman

Amber Tuccaro
- Born: Amber Alyssa Tuccaro; 3 January 1990
- Disappeared: 18 August 2010 (aged 20); Edmonton, Alberta, Canada
- Body discovered: 1 September 2012; Leduc County, Edmonton Metropolitan Region, Canada
- Resting place: Fort Chipewyan Cemetery, Alberta, Canada; 58.7187°N 111.469°W (approximate)
- Known for: Victim of unsolved homicide

Amber Alyssa Tuccaro (3 January 1990 – disappeared 18 August 2010) was a twenty-year-old Canadian First Nations woman from Fort McMurray, Alberta, who went missing in 2010. Tuccaro was last seen near Edmonton, hitchhiking with an unidentified man. Her remains were found in 2012. As of 2026, her case is still unsolved.

The Royal Canadian Mounted Police (RCMP) investigation of her disappearance was sharply criticized by the Tuccaro family, who alleged that police downplayed their concerns. A federal review released in 2018 found that the RCMP's investigation was "deficient" and "did not comply with procedures and guidelines".

Her case is among the high number of missing and murdered Indigenous women of Canada.

== Background ==
Amber Tuccaro was born in 1990 in Alberta, Canada. She was a member of the Mikisew Cree First Nation. At the time of her disappearance, she was living in Fort McMurray, Alberta, with her mother and 14-month-old son.

== Disappearance ==
Locations
1 Edmonton where Tuccaro asked to be taken.
2 Nisku where Tuccaro was staying.
3 Leduc where Tuccaro's remains where found.

External videos
- YouTube videos
- Amber Tuccaro's last phone call CBC News: The National

On 17 August 2010, Tuccaro flew from her home in Fort McMurray to Edmonton with her infant son and a female friend for a short vacation. The group booked a hotel in nearby Nisku. Tuccaro was last seen the following day on 18 August 2010 at about 8 p.m. when she accepted a ride into Edmonton from an unknown man. She received a phone call during the ride in which the male driver can be heard in the background assuring Tuccaro that they are heading east on a back road towards Edmonton. Police believe the man actually drove south into rural Leduc County.

Police released a recording of the phone call in 2012. Tuccaro can be heard in the recording telling the driver, "You'd better not be taking me anywhere I don't want to go." Investigators continue to seek the assistance of the public to identify the voice of the driver. Tuccaro's remains were discovered by horseback riders on 1 September 2012 in a field in Leduc County. Her remains were positively identified by dental records.

== Criticism of RCMP investigation ==
On 4 September 2010, a press release from the Royal Canadian Mounted Police (RCMP) said they did not believe Tuccaro was in any danger. The family felt the RCMP were not taking her disappearance seriously, and that investigators were biased by stereotypes about Indigenous women.

After Tuccaro's remains were found on 1 September 2012, her family said police rarely shared updates about the murder investigation. Tuccaro's brother, Paul Tuccaro, was told by police that they had waited a year before releasing the audio of Tuccaro and the unknown man to the public and media.

Tuccaro's family filed a complaint with the Civilian Review and Complaints Commission for the Royal Canadian Mounted Police in 2014. After conducting their independent review of the RCMP's investigation, the Commission released a 120-page report in August 2018. The report concluded that the RCMP's investigation was "deficient in that various members were either not properly trained or did not adhere to their training and that various members did not comply with procedures and guidelines."

The report also found that the RCMP did not begin investigating Tuccaro's disappearance until a month after she was reported missing. Police initially told her family that Tuccaro was "probably out partying" and that they needed to wait 24 hours before initiating a missing person's investigation. It also took four months for RCMP officers investigating the disappearance to conduct any interviews, which the commission described as "unreasonable and unexplained."

Tuccaro was eventually listed as a missing person, but was quickly removed from the list based on unconfirmed, alleged sightings. She was put back on the list on 23 September 2010, but no apology was made to the family for having removed her in the first place. The Commission's report stated that removing Tuccaro from the missing persons database was an "erroneous decision."

The RCMP was heavily criticized for not contacting or interviewing a woman who travelled with Tuccaro from Fort McMurray to Edmonton. This person, whose name was redacted in the report, was never considered a person of interest.

A suitcase with Tuccaro's belongings was also accidentally destroyed by investigators after they recovered it from her Nisku motel room. The report said a constable and corporal with the Leduc RCMP detachment, whose names were redacted, "failed to properly follow policy or reasonable investigative practices for securing seized property."

Deputy Commissioner Curtis Zablocki apologized to the family 11 months after the report was released on 25 July 2019 and said the RCMP's investigation "was not our best work." The family rejected Zablocki's apology.

== See also ==
- List of solved missing person cases (post-2000)
