= Sunfish (musical) =

Sunfish is a musical with book and lyrics by Michael Cooper and book and music by Hyeyoung Kim, based upon the Korean folktale Sim-Chung. The musical received its world premiere production at the Stoneham Theater in Boston, Massachusetts from February 10 to February 27, 2011 and went on to international acclaim, opening at the Daegu International Music Theater Festival in South Korea on June 17 to June 23, 2013 where it was awarded Top Jury Honor.

== Synopsis ==
“Sunfish” is a musical retelling of the Sim-Chung Korean folk tale which follows the journey of a devoted daughter trying to help her blind father regain his eyesight - and the valiant sacrifices she is willing to make for love.

== Production history ==
1. May 4, 2004: First public reading, NYU Black Box Theatre, Tisch Graduate Musical Theatre Writing Program. “Sunfish” was originally developed and workshopped under the title, “The Story of Aheh.”
2. January 2005: Cooper and Kim win the 2005 Jonathan Larson Performing Arts Foundation Award.
3. February 2005: World Premiere Student Production, Yale University Off- Broadway Theatre.
4. March 2005: Recipient of the Daryl Roth Award, featured as part of the NYU Fresh Look Series. Directed by Nick Corley, Musical Direction by Joshua Salzman.
5. May 2005: Selected for a two-week workshop at New York University's Tisch Graduate Acting Department, as part of the Write Act Festival of New Work. Directed by Lonny Price, Musical Direction by John DiPinto.
6. November 2005: Received the Daniel Marshall Multicultural Award for Non-Traditional Musical Theatre; selected for TRU Voices New Musical Reading Series.
7. December 2005: Staged Reading, Blue Heron Theatre (TRU New Voices Musical Reading Series). Produced by Eva Price, Directed by Ben Rimalower, Musical Direction by Jasper Grant.
8. April 2006: Staged Reading, Alliance Theatre, GA. Directed by Kent Gash. Kendeda Playwriting Competition Finalist.
9. October 2006: Showcased at the National Alliance For Musical Theatre's 18th Annual Festival of New Musicals, New World Stages, NYC. Directed by Stafford Arima, Musical Staging by Patricia Wilcox, Musical Direction by Jesse Vargas.
10. January 2007: Roundtable Reading at the Lark Play Development Center, NYC. Directed by Daniella Tool.
11. June 2007: 2-week developmental student workshop at SUNY Cortland University, Cortland NY. Directed by Darren Katz.
12. April 2010: ASCAP Workshop presentation, moderated by Stephen Schwartz. Directed by Thomas Caruso, Musical Direction by Dan Feyer.
13. August 2010: Prospect Theatre/Goodwill Theatre 2-week workshop, Binghamton, NY. Directed by Cara Reichel, Musical Direction by Or Matias.
14. February 2011: World Premiere Regional Theatre Production, Stoneham Theatre, Stoneham, MA. Directed by Caitlin Lowans, Musical Direction by John Howrey.
15. January 2012: Winner of BWW Boston Awards for “Best Musical – Medium Theater” category.
16. May 2013: “One Night Only: Songs From Sunfish” presented at Lincoln Center, Bruno Walter Auditorium, directed and produced by John Zndarsic.
17. June 2013: Selected to open DIMF (Daegu International Musical Theatre Festival) in Daegu, South Korea. Directed by Will Pomerantz, Musical Direction by Yan Li.

== Synopsis & Musical Numbers ==
ACT ONE (PROLOGUE: ONCE (UPON A WHILE AGO) In a village by the sea ruled by a powerful King, Father and daughter live a hardscrabble life on the streets. By night, he attempts to calm his starving child by recounting the dream he had on the day she was born (LULLABY). By day, Father and Aheh beg door to door, struggling to remain optimistic in the face of adversity (HOW YOU LOOK AT IT). Elsewhere in the village, we meet Madame Bang Duk Omi - the ugly, conniving town wench (MADAME OMI). Madame Omi is a devious swindler of blind men, seducing her unlucky victims and stealing their rice (the equivalent of money in this faraway land). As the days go by, Aheh takes it upon herself to support her Father and sets off to find work (HOW YOU LOOK AT IT (Reprise). Early the next morning, in the Village, Aheh learns the story of the Magic Buddhist Monk who can grant miracles. When Father awakens to find Aheh gone, he goes off in search of her and meets Madame Omi. At first, Omi attempts to woo him, but soon realizes that he has nothing she needs, so she abandons him on the side of the road. Disoriented, Father stumbles into a nearby swamp and is rescued by the Magic Monk himself, who promises to restore Father's eyesight for only three hundred bags of rice (if paid by the next full moon) – conjuring several miraculous examples to prove it (MADAME OMI (Reprise)/THE DEAL/HOW YOU LOOK AT IT (Reprise 2). Secretly, Aheh becomes determined to save up enough rice so that her Father will be able to pay the Monk's fee. Toiling ever harder, Aheh labors many long hours for several employers at a multitude of demanding jobs, all the while dreaming of the day her Father will have his eyesight (HOUSEKEEPING). Opportunity unexpectedly presents itself in the form of a group of superstitious Sailors who arrive in the village, willing to pay three hundred bags of rice in exchange for a virgin to sacrifice to the God of the Sea (YO, HO, HO!). Aheh sees this as her only chance and strikes a deal with them: her life, for the rice. Madame Omi overhears their exchange and plots to steal the rice for herself (MADAME OMI (Reprise 2). That night, unable to say goodbye (THE WAY I’LL SAY GOODBYE), Aheh prepares to leave her Father behind, withholding the truth from him until the final moment when the Sailors return to take her away. They set sail at sunrise, sacrificing Aheh to the God of the Sea by throwing her overboard. Father is left alone and devastated with his three hundred bags of rice - and only the conniving Madame Omi to “comfort” him (ANY MINUTE NOW).

ACT TWO Aheh drowns to the bottom of the ocean (DOWN). There, the God of the Sea is so incredibly moved by her sacrifice that he breathes life back into her and offers her a second chance, foretelling her destiny to meet the King. Colorful Sea Creatures prepare Aheh for her journey home (THE MAKEOVER) and send her back to the surface in a lotus blossom (HOME TO YOU). Servants discover the lotus blossom floating on the ocean and bring it to the attention of the King. When he touches the blossom, its petals open to reveal Aheh inside, and he falls in love with her at first sight (AWKWARD). In the Hall of Ancestors, the King leads Aheh on a tour of his and lineage, while Aheh helps him to realize his own greatness HOW YOU LOOK AT IT (Reprise 3). Back in the village, Madame Omi forces opium on Father to help his pain.” In his mind, a chorus of Spurned Blind Men portends disaster, warning Father to beware of Madame Omi - who proceeds to steal his rice and vanish off into the night (MADAME OMI (Reprise 3). On the eve of the full moon, Madame Omi goes to the Monk's temple on the mountain, paying him with Father's stolen rice to transform her from hideous wench into a beautiful Princess (WHO’S AS LUCKY AS ME?). Meanwhile, betrayed and alone, Father searches the Village for Madame Omi, haunted by regret (LOST). Although grateful for her brand new life, Aheh misses her Father. The King proclaims that he will hold a feast for all the blind men in the land, in the hopes that he can somehow reunite them (NO MATTER WHAT). Word of the feast spreads quickly, as blind men from all around make their way to the palace (FEAST). On the final day of the celebration, Father arrives and Aheh rushes into his arms. Their joyous reunion results in a true miracle: Father magically regains his sight. Simultaneously, Madame Omi is punished with blindness, cursed to never admire her beautiful new exterior (FINALE). At long last, Father finally sees his Sunfish. Anything is possible (EPILOGUE: ONCE (UPON A WHILE AGO) (Reprise).
