= Richard Eder =

American journalist (1932–2014)

- Born: Richard Gray Eder; August 16, 1932; Washington, D.C., U.S.
- Died: November 21, 2014 (aged 82); Boston, Massachusetts, U.S.
- Education: Harvard University (BA)
- Occupations: Film critic, drama critic

Richard Gray Eder (August 16, 1932 – November 21, 2014) was an American film reviewer and a drama critic.

== Life and career ==
For 20 years, he worked as a foreign correspondent, a film reviewer, and the drama critic for The New York Times.

Subsequently, he was book critic for the Los Angeles Times, winning a Pulitzer Prize for Criticism and the National Book Critics Circle annual citation for an entry consisting of reviews of John Updike's Roger's Version, Clarice Lispector's The Hour of the Star, and Robert Stone's Children of Light.

In the later years of his life, he wrote book reviews for The New York Times, the Los Angeles Times, and The Boston Globe. On November 21, 2014, Eder died of pneumonia as a result of post-polio syndrome in Boston, Massachusetts, aged 82. He was a great-grandson of James Martin Eder.
