= Damascus Gate (novel) =

1998 novel by Robert Stone

- Author: Robert Stone
- Language: English
- Genre: Literary fiction · Political thriller
- Publisher: Houghton Mifflin
- Publication date: May 14, 1998
- Publication place: United States
- Media type: Print (hardcover & paperback)
- Pages: 512 pp.
- Awards: Finalist, National Book Award for Fiction (1998)
- ISBN: 0-395-66569-8
- Preceded by: Outerbridge Reach
- Followed by: Bay of Souls

Damascus Gate is a novel by American author Robert Stone, published in 1998. Set in Jerusalem during the 1990s, the book was a finalist for the National Book Award.

== Plot summary ==
The protagonist of the book is Christopher Lucas, an American freelance journalist who is investigating religious and political tensions in Israel.

Lucas uncovers a plot to blow up the Dome of the Rock and rebuild the Third Temple. Other important characters in the book (who like Lucas are also American) include Sonia Barnes, a Jewish-Sufi mystic who has a romantic relationship with Lucas; Adam De Kuff, a mentally unstable man from a prominent New Orleans family who quotes the Zohar and claims to be the Messiah; and Raziel Melker, a heroin addict and the son of a senator who is devoted to De Kuff but whose motives are unclear.

The novel contains many other characters, including rabbis, imams, priests, missionaries, settlers, and activists. "Surprisingly, however, in this novel about Jerusalem, none of the main characters is Israeli or Palestinian."

== Inspiration ==
Christopher Lucas, the protagonist in Damascus Gate, is considered by some (including Robert Stone's biographer) to be semi-autobiographical. Stone, like Lucas, was a journalist, and there are several biographical parallels between them. Stone's mother hinted that his father might have been Jewish, though this was never confirmed, mirroring Lucas's background of having a Jewish father and a Catholic mother, yet being raised Catholic. Both Stone and Lucas experienced the absence of their fathers, who were described as more of a "rumor rather than a presence." Additionally, both attended Catholic schools and had mothers who would bring them to the King Cole Bar at the St. Regis Hotel.

One critic, Adam Kirsch, compared the relationship between Adam De Kuff and Raziel Melker to Jesus and Paul. Another writer, Madison Smartt Bell, sees the relationship as more akin to Sabbatai Zevi and his disciple (and promoter) Nathan of Gaza, with the narrative of Damascus Gate echoing the real-life saga of the 17th-century Sabbatean cult. Bell quotes from Robert Stone's preface to the Franklin Library first edition of Damascus Gate to demonstrate that this connection with the 17th century false messiah was actually the author's intent.

== Influence and significance ==
Damascus Gate received mostly positive reviews for its suspenseful plot and complex character development. Bill Ott wrote that Damascus Gate was "the best novel of the year" and "a compelling novel of ideas, securely grounded in the stones of Jerusalem." Sybil Steinberg called the novel "bold and bracing, ambitious and inspired," and wrote that "Damascus Gate is, even for its flaws, an astonishment." Kirkus Reviews said that the book's "intensity of its characters’ emotions maintains high interest and irresistibly mounting suspense. Stone’s boldest and, arguably, best novel is ... not to be missed."

Some critics viewed Damascus Gate as a deeply flawed work. Hillel Halkin said that the book "is really a rip-off of a country and a tradition that deserve better at his hands." Robert S. Frederickson wrote that Stone’s language in this novel "has a cracked and schizoid relation to reality and cannot assuage the sense of existential dread that haunts his world." Jonathan Rosen called the novel "an American religious fantasy."

But most critics praised the novel. Michiko Kakutani described the second half of the book as "masterly, thrilling, coiled and somehow both inevitable and surprising." Lawrence Rungren called it a "powerful literary thriller" and "a vivid, multilayered tale of the darkness that too often bedevils humanity's search for the light." John Garvey wrote that "Stone shows how close and at the same time how far apart are the worlds of the nihilist and the genuine believer. And if you feel uncomfortable with the ideas that crop up here, read the book as a great thriller. It works wonderfully at both levels."

== Market impact ==
In 1992, Stone received a $600,000 advance for what would become Damascus Gate. When the book was finally published in 1998, he embarked on a nationwide book tour, which proved to be highly successful. Damascus Gate sold nearly 112,000 copies in hardcover, while the paperback rights were auctioned to Simon & Schuster for $357,500. Additionally, the novel secured a $100,000 deal for inclusion in the Book-of-the-Month Club.
