= A Fan's Notes (film) =

1972 film directed by Eric Till

- Directed by: Eric Till
- Written by: Frederick Earl Exley (novel); William Kinsolving
- Produced by: Martin Davidson
- Starring: Jerry Orbach
- Cinematography: Harry Makin
- Edited by: Michael Manne
- Music by: Ron Collier
- Production company: Coquihala
- Distributed by: Warner Bros.
- Release date: July 21, 1972
- Running time: 90 minutes
- Country: Canada
- Language: English
- Budget: $800,000

A Fan's Notes is a 1972 Canadian comedy film directed by Eric Till, based on Frederick Earl Exley's novel of the same name. It was entered into the 1972 Cannes Film Festival.

== Plot ==
Jerry Orbach plays a middle-aged dreamer and football fan, longs to be someone rich and famous but instead has to come to terms with the fact he can only be a fan, not a player.

== Cast ==
- Jerry Orbach as Fred
- Patricia Collins as Patience
- Burgess Meredith as Mr. Blue
- Rosemary Murphy as Moms
- Conrad Bain as Poppy
- Ken James as Joey the Bartender

== Production ==
The film was shot from 8 September 1970 to 22 January 1971, on a budget of $800,000 (equivalent to $6,285,167 in 2025), with $200,000 coming from the Canadian Film Development Corporation.

== Release ==
A Fan's Notes and The True Nature of Bernadette were the first privately funded Canadian films shown at the Cannes Film Festival. The film was theatrically released on 29 September 1972, in Toronto.

== Works cited ==
- Spencer, Michael (2003). Hollywood North: Creating the Canadian Motion Picture Industry. Cantos International Publishing. ISBN 289594007X.
- Turner, D. John, ed. (1987). Canadian Feature Film Index: 1913-1985. Canadian Film Institute. ISBN 0660533642.
