= The Hair of Harold Roux =

1974 novel by Thomas Williams

- First edition cover
- Author: Thomas Williams
- Language: English
- Genre: Fiction
- Publisher: Random House
- Publication date: 1974
- Publication place: United States
- Media type: Print (hardcover & paperback)
- Pages: 373
- Awards: National Book Award
- ISBN: 978-1608195831

The Hair of Harold Roux is a 1974 novel by Thomas Williams. The novel shared the National Book Award for Fiction with Robert Stone's Dog Soldiers.

== Plot and summary ==
"The Hair of Harold Roux" explores the craft of storytelling and its intersections—and at times collisions—with everyday life and mortality.

The narrative spine of the novel bridges a long weekend in the life of Aaron Benham, a clinically depressed literature professor at a New Hampshire college who has taken a leave of absence to write a novel, also called "The Hair of Harold Roux." Williams punctuates the primary plot with frequent flashbacks, a long fairy tale that Aaron had told his children over several nights before bedtime, and the text of the novel within the novel, which is based on Aaron's own experiences in college following World War II.

As the main story opens, Aaron is alone in his home office in the spring of 1970, struggling to push aside the mental distractions of his life to work on his novel. Aaron is interrupted by a succession of phone calls—first, from the mother of one of his students, who seems to have vanished; second, from the wife of a colleague at the college, George, who is neglecting his dissertation and is in danger of losing his job. Aaron returns from addressing the latter crisis to discover that he has forgotten his in-laws' wedding anniversary and that his wife and two children have left for the celebration without him.

Stewing in his remorse, Aaron recalls an incident involving his missing student, Mark Rasmussen, who had persuaded him to work for a day on a fishing excursion boat as a way to experience life outside academia. On the boat, Aaron is enraged when the drunken guests begin to snag flying gulls with baited fish hooks; he halts the depravity by punching one of the perpetrators, a descent into violence that leaves him ashamed and depressed.

Aaron is distracted again by a call from colleague George, who persuades him to come to dinner and do a reading for his senior seminar students. Before leaving, Aaron calls his in-laws to apologize for missing their anniversary but declines to speak to his wife.

The story that Aaron reads to the students is narrated by a present-day Allard Benson, who like Aaron is a college professor in New Hampshire. It details his loathing of the people around him, including students, a local handyman, and a conspiracy-obsessed factory worker, all of whom are plagued by paranoia in varying degrees. After the reading, Aaron learns from several of the students that their missing classmate, Mark, is in the grip of serious drug addiction and delusion. (Later, a phone call from Mark seems to confirm this.) Aaron spends the night at George's home, struggling with an intense sexual longing for George's wife, Helga.

The novel within the novel centers on Allard Benson, an Army veteran turned college student, and his friend Harold Roux, a failed seminarian and deputy infantry chaplain who has gone prematurely bald and adopted an unfortunate toupée. Allard and Harold discuss literature and other matters with Mary, Harold's romantic obsession, to whom Allard is immediately attracted. Harold shares with Allard portions of his own novel, titled "Glitter and Gold" (which is, for those keeping track, a novel within a novel within a novel).

Allard and Harold also do battle with one Boom Maloumian, an obese Armenian student who terrorizes their dormitory and regales them with vulgar tales of military life. During one drunken afternoon, some of his dorm mates fantasize about forcibly removing the toupée from Harold’s head; Harold, feeling disrespected, decides to leave school and work as a caretaker at a roadside motel and tourist attraction designed to resemble a Lilliputian town.

Even as Allard promises to wed Mary, he carries on an intense and often contentious sexual affair with Mary's college roommate, Naomi. A visit to meet Mary's devoutly Catholic father, coupled with trip to Sunday mass, leaves Allard conflicted over his sexual longing for a woman whose religious faith he finds ludicrous and destructive. (On the other hand, Naomi's commitment to leftist ideology strikes him as equally stupid and pointless.) After repeated attempts at seduction, Allard forces himself upon Mary, an act that constitutes spiritual as well as physical rape.

Both Aaron Benham and his fictional counterpart share a love for their motorcycle (Aaron's a Honda, Allard's an Indian Pony), and both are obsessed with riding fast, to "the very edge of danger." Inevitably, Aaron crashes his bike on a remote gravel road and his wounds are dressed by Therese, a hairdresser to whom Aaron has long felt an attraction.

Still in pain, Aaron manages to attend a hastily called meeting of senior department faculty at which George's failure to complete his dissertation is to be addressed. Aaron has the opportunity to mount a vocal defense of his friend but instead idly daydreams about committing suicide by jumping out the window.

After touring Harold's miniature town, Allard selects it as the site of a year-end party for some of his fellow students. While skinny dipping in Lilliputown's large pond, Allard again forces himself sexually on, this time, Naomi, in full view of Mary. Harold's knowledge of Allard's actions—and his eventual realization that Mary and Allard have also had sex—sends him into a rage. In the ensuing fistfight, Allard accidentally pulls off Harold's hairpiece, a moment of unthinkable humiliation at the hands of a man Harold had considered his friend.

The party descends into total chaos when Boom Maloumian, drunk and angry that he had not been invited, arrives with several belligerent fraternity brothers and a prostitute. The scene ends in violence, sexual assault, a spectacular (and literal) train wreck, and the departure of Harold, presumably forever and without his novel manuscript or his hairpiece. Mary resolves not to return to the school in the fall, and Naomi says that, if pregnant by Allard, she will get an abortion. Allard is last seen leaving "for his home in Leah, where he stayed a few days before heading west."

The bedtime story that Aaron told his children, Janie and Billy, is split into sections interspersed throughout the novel. The tale focuses on two youngsters, also named Janie and Billy, who live with their parents in an isolated cabin in the woods. One year, the family fails to receive their annual October visit from a trader upon whom they depend for winter provisions in exchange for their handmade knives and moccasins. Facing starvation, the family is visited instead by a mysterious old woman who speaks only in sign language and who presents them with a basket of herbs and unidentifiable powders. These items later save the children's father from sickness and the family from starvation. But in the midst of a hard freeze, the family cow, Oka, escapes the barn, and Janie sets out into the harsh wilderness to find her. Billy follows and, having "gained strength and knowledge" from the powders, locates his lost sister and the cow and returns them safely home.

Aaron, back in the present and awaiting the return home of his own children with a mixture of relief and despair, rereads a letter from a former lover, "Maura," clearly the model for Allard's lover Mary. She regretfully expresses her love for Aaron, her feelings of emptiness after his betrayal, and her confidence that he will nonetheless carry on because "nothing really matters to you."

Aaron reflects on the messiness of reality compared to storytelling, concluding that "you can't write another man's story for him." The novel ends with Aaron dreaming of himself as a younger man, being watched in his brownstone apartment by a strange woman, "in part every woman he has loved," and to whom he extends his arms.

== Reception ==
Despite sharing the National Book Award in 1975, the book fell out of print and was not republished until 2011, when it received another round of favorable reviews.

The novel is a favorite among writers such as Joseph Heller, Andre Dubus III, and Stephen King, who dedicated his 1993 story collection Nightmares & Dreamscapes to Williams and described The Hair of Harold Roux as a book “I keep coming back to.” "I've read it four or five times," King said. "It's a couple of days in the life of this guy, Aaron Benham, who's writing a book about a man who is writing a book. It's this little house of mirrors. I love it because it tells the truth as I understand it about what it is to be a writer."
