= Prime Green =

2007 memoir by Robert Stone

Prime Green: Remembering the Sixties
- Author: Robert Stone
- Language: English
- Genre: autobiography, memoir
- Publisher: HarperCollins Publishers
- Publication date: January 5, 2007
- Publication place: United States
- Pages: 229 pp
- ISBN: 9780060198169
- OCLC: 466315902
- Preceded by: Bay of Souls
- Followed by: Fun with Problems

Prime Green: Remembering the Sixties is a memoir by novelist Robert Stone, published in 2007. The book is structured as a series of personal vignettes recounting Stone's global experiences covering approximately 15 years, from about 1958 to 1972.

Stone begins this memoir during his final year in the military (1958), when he visited South Africa as a navy journalist. At that time, Stone was serving in the Navy aboard a transport ship in the Indian Ocean.

The book ends with Stone in another foreign outpost, this time working as a reporter and correspondent in Vietnam, where he witnessed the invasion of Laos. Some of these experiences were the impetus for what is perhaps Stone's most well-known book: the National Book Award-winning novel Dog Soldiers, published in 1974.

Many things happen during the time period between these two episodes. Some of the highlights include Stone's marriage to his wife Janice, and their move to New Orleans in 1960, a city that provides the setting for his first novel A Hall of Mirrors. Stone also describes his family's four-year expatriation in England. However, the core of Prime Green is Stone's account of his friendship with Ken Kesey, starting at Stanford but including New York at the end of Kesey's famous bus trip with the Merry Pranksters to the 1964 New York World's Fair. Michael Silverblatt points out in an interview with Stone that the various "locutions," specific to the 1960s, are interesting to hear again as they're channeled through the prose of Prime Green. Stone agrees that some of the images of the 1960s evoked by the spoken word now seem anachronistic. But other locutions still retain their evocative qualities.

The memoir is an important document for some cultural historians because it is a first-hand account of many (now iconic) 1960s counterculture moments in the United States, and so may be a vital primary source documenting a crucial time period in a country's cultural, literary, and historical inheritance, transition, and legacy.

== Critical reception ==
Kirkus Reviews called the book "an excellent piece of work, and an invaluable gloss on a body of fiction that looks more prescient, and important, as the decades pass."
