= Harold Strauss =

American book editor (1907–1975)

Harold Strauss (1907–1975) was editor-in-chief of Alfred A. Knopf Inc. from 1942 until 1966. He is credited with introducing postwar Japanese fiction to American audiences with Jirō Osaragi's Homecoming and Jun'ichirō Tanizaki's Some Prefer Nettles in 1955. He was also integral in introducing works by other Japanese authors like Kōbō Abe, Yukio Mishima and Yasunari Kawabata. With his wife Mildred, he is the namesake of the American Academy of Arts and Letters's Strauss Living Award.

== Work in Publishing ==
In 1928, Strauss began working for Alfred H. King, Inc. then Covici-Friede (where he argued for publication of John Steinbeck's In Dubious Battle) until it went out of business in 1937. While stationed in Japan after World War II, Strauss reported on trends in Japanese print media. After the war, his introduction of Japanese literature to American audiences was part of a larger cultural exchange in order to protect American interests in Asia during the Cold War and aftermath of the Korean War.

== Strauss Living Award ==
Granted through the American Academy of Arts and Letters, the Strauss Living Award (founded in 1981) provides two living writers with $100,000 a year for two years.

=== Award Winners ===
1983: Cynthia Ozick, Raymond Carver

1988: Robert Stone, Diane Johnson

1993: John Casey, Joy Williams

1998: Marilynne Robinson, W.D. Wetherell

2003: Gish Jen, Claire Messud

2008: Madison Smartt Bell, William T. Vollmann

2016: Adam Haslett, Jesmyn Ward
