= William Faulkner Prize =

The William Faulkner Prize or William Faulkner Award could refer to:

- William Faulkner Prize (Rennes, a prize given by the William Faulkner Foundation at University of Rennes 2 in France.
- Pirate's Alley William Faulkner Prize, a prize given by the Pirate's Alley Faulkner Society in New Orleans.
- William Faulkner Foundation Award, an award given by the William Faulkner Foundation in the United States.
- PEN/Faulkner Award for Fiction, a prize given by the PEN/Faulkner Foundation.

Note: This is not a complete list. There may be other William Faulkner Awards and Prize's not listed here. see also: William Faulkner, the prizes namesake
