= Death of the Black-Haired Girl =

2013 novel by Robert Stone

- First edition
- Author: Robert Stone
- Language: English
- Published: November 12, 2013 (Houghton Mifflin Harcourt)
- Publication place: United States
- Pages: 288
- ISBN: 978-0618386239
- Preceded by: Fun With Problems (2010)
- Followed by: current

Death of the Black-Haired Girl is the eighth published novel by author Robert Stone (1937-2015). The hardcover version was published on November 12, 2013. The e-book edition was released a week before, on November 5, 2013. It was also the final novel that Stone published during his lifetime.
