= A Flag for Sunrise =

1981 Robert Stone novel

- Author: Robert Stone
- Language: English
- Genre: Political thriller, literary fiction
- Set in: Central America
- Publisher: Alfred A. Knopf
- Publication date: 1981
- Awards: Los Angeles Times Book Prize for Fiction
- ISBN: 0-679-73762-6

A Flag for Sunrise is a 1981 political thriller novel by American author Robert Stone set in Tecan, a fictional Central American country, during a period of political unrest. Stone's third novel, A Flag for Sunrise was a finalist for the National Book Award for Fiction and the PEN/Faulkner Award for Fiction, and won the Los Angeles Times Book Prize for Fiction. The novel examines the effects of American political intervention abroad, as well as themes of political and religious idealism versus a morally ambiguous reality.

== Plot ==
The novel is set primarily in the fictional Central American country of Tecan, where political tensions are rising toward revolution. The narrative follows several characters whose lives intersect: Frank Holliwell, an American anthropologist with prior connections to U.S. intelligence, who travels to the region to give a lecture and is asked to provide information to contacts in the Central Intelligence Agency; Sister Justin Feeney, an American nun, who works at a coastal mission and becomes increasingly sympathetic to local revolutionary movements; Father Charles Egan, a Canadian priest, who struggles with his faith and alcoholism while continuing his work in the country; and Pablo Tabor, a former U.S. Coast Guard member, who becomes involved in gunrunning activities connected to the conflict. As the political situation deteriorates, the characters are drawn into violence and espionage as well as their own personal and moral crises.

== Reception ==
The novel won received generally positive reviews. In The New York Times, critic Michael Wood praised it as having the “pace and suspense of a first-class thriller” and compared it to the works of B. Traven. Kirkus Reviews praised it as "the work of a truly powerful, unduplicated voice" and that "Stone lights every page with the superiority of his prose." However, both reviews noted that the novel was at times overwritten. It won the Los Angeles Times Book Prize for Fiction and was a finalist for the PEN/Faulkner Award for Fiction and National Book Award for Fiction. A Flag for Sunrise was twice a finalist for the National Book Award, once following its hardcover release and again the next year when it was reissued in paperback.
