= Jim Yardley =

American journalist (born 1964)

- Born: James Barrett Yardley; June 18, 1964 (age 62); New York City, U.S.
- Status: married
- Occupation: journalist
- Notable credit(s): The New York Times, The Atlanta Journal-Constitution
- Spouse: Theodora
- Children: 3
- Family: Jonathan Yardley (father); Rosemary Roberts (mother); William Yardley (brother)

James Barrett Yardley (born June 18, 1964) is an American journalist.

== Education ==
Yardley is a graduate of Walter Hines Page High School in Greensboro, North Carolina and received a B.A. in history from the University of North Carolina at Chapel Hill in 1986.

== Career ==
Yardley joined The New York Times in 1997 and first worked as a metropolitan reporter in New York, before becoming the bureau chief in Houston in 1999. His topics have included social unrest, minority uprisings, and pollution issues in China. He was the South Asia bureau chief based in New Delhi until 2013, when he moved to Rome and became the bureau chief there. After 13 years as a foreign correspondent, Yardley and his family moved to London where he now works as the Europe editor.

From 1990 to 1997, Yardley was a national desk reporter for The Atlanta Journal-Constitution, based in Atlanta, Birmingham and New Orleans.

Yardley has also worked for the Anniston Star and New York Times Company regional newspapers in Fairfax County, Virginia. He has also written magazine articles for The New York Times Magazine, Oxford American, Essence and Redbook.

== Awards ==
In 2006, Yardley and his colleague, Times Beijing bureau chief Joseph Kahn, won the Pulitzer Prize for International Reporting for a series of eight articles on the "ragged justice in China as the booming nation's legal system evolves", including their coverage of the detention of American-Chinese entrepreneur David Ji.

In 2007, Yardley's article "Crisis on the Yellow River"—published in three parts in the Asia edition of the International Herald Tribune—won the Society of Publishers in Asia award for explanatory reporting.

In 2014, Yardley won the George Polk Award for foreign reporting and the Gerald Loeb Award for Breaking News for a series of articles on unsafe work conditions in the garment industry in Bangladesh and the collapse of a factory building that killed more than 1,100 workers.

== Family ==
Yardley is a son of Jonathan Yardley, a book critic for The Washington Post, and Rosemary Roberts. He and his father are one of two pairs of father-son Pulitzer Prize winners. Yardley's brother Bill is the Seattle bureau chief for the Los Angeles Times.

Yardley lives in London with his wife and three children.

== Bibliography ==
- Brave Dragons: A Chinese Basketball Team, an American Coach, and Two Cultures Clashing. New York: Random House, 2013. ISBN 978-0-307-47336-3
