= Bay of Souls =

2003 novel by Robert Stone

- First edition cover
- Author: Robert Stone
- Language: English
- Genre: Psychological fiction
- Publisher: Houghton Mifflin
- Publication date: April 22, 2003
- Publication place: United States
- Media type: Print (hardcover & paperback)
- Pages: 249
- ISBN: 0395963494
- OCLC: 51223715
- Dewey Decimal: 813.54
- LC Class: PS3569.T6418 B3 2003
- Preceded by: Damascus Gate
- Followed by: Prime Green: Remembering the Sixties

Bay of Souls (2003) is the seventh novel by American author Robert Stone. It was recognized as one of the "Notable Fiction Books of 2003" by The New York Times.

== Plot summary ==
Bay of Souls begins with its central character, Michael Ahearn, and his companions engaging in a hunting expedition reminiscent of James Dickey's Deliverance (1970), set in the wilderness of Minnesota. However, Michael's attempt to embody a Hemingwayesque persona is hindered by his tendency to daydream; he brings a gun merely as a justification for being in the woods. While waiting in a deer stand, Michael encounters a peculiar hunter struggling to transport a large buck with an inadequate wheelbarrow. Despite finding amusement in the man's plight, this encounter foreshadows the burdens that the characters will later face in the novel and their struggles to bear them. For instance, shortly after the hunting incident, Michael's son Paul nearly succumbs to exposure while searching for his dog in the snow. Subsequently, Michael's wife, Kristin, fractures her leg while attempting to carry their son home. Following these events, Michael's relationship with his wife deteriorates, leading him to seek solace in the company of Lara Purcell, a political science professor.

Lara Purcell, a character in "Bay of Souls," is depicted as a femme fatale with a fascination for Caribbean voodoo. Her involvement with Michael leads to an extramarital affair, characterized by risky behavior such as erotic gunplay and cocaine use. Lara's enigmatic past includes connections to Soviet espionage and ties to South American organized crime. Her cavalier attitude towards peril entices Michael into attempting to embody the adventurous spirit he has been exploring through literature.

Michael engages in an extramarital relationship with Lara without his wife Kristin's awareness. He becomes entangled in Lara's world and eagerly accepts an invitation to visit her homeland, the strife-ridden island of St. Trinity. When Lara questions Michael about his allegiance, he readily commits to joining her in embracing danger and excitement, which he perceives as lacking in his roles as a professor and a family man.

Lara's return to St. Trinity ostensibly serves multiple purposes. She claims she must sell her share in the Bay of Saints Hotel and oversee the spiritual transition of her deceased brother's soul from Guinee, an underwater purgatory, to a place of honor. Additionally, Lara asserts the need to reclaim her own soul, which she believes her brother's spirit entrusted to a voodoo figure named Marinette. This semi-serious religious undertone casts doubt on Lara's true intentions. Although Michael hesitates to acknowledge it, he realizes that if Lara lacks a soul, her allure may be derived from hidden forces with their own agenda, rather than the motivations she claims to have. He contemplates that without a soul, their connection would be mere illusion.

As Michael navigates between the academic world of the Midwest and the intrigue of Third World politics, he struggles to translate his theories into action. Upon his arrival in St. Trinity, Michael is thrust into a tumultuous environment of voodoo rituals, military conflict, CIA involvement, and illicit drug trafficking. A small plane carrying what appears to be drugs and emeralds crashes into the ocean, partially due to Lara's involvement with the Colombian militia. She abruptly appears in Michael's hotel room, engages in intimacy with him, and then requests his assistance in retrieving the containers lost in the crash. Despite his apprehension, Michael agrees, believing that moral courage requires physical bravery. He gathers scuba diving equipment, ventures beyond a moonlit reef, and descends into the depths of the Atlantic Ocean.

As Michael submerges into the water, he experiences a sense of liberation, feeling like "a different animal in a different element." This departure from the constant introspection of academia provides him with a welcome change. Retrieving the packages from the overturned plane deep underwater presents a colorful and dramatic challenge. Michael must navigate the risk of the plane shifting and potentially trapping him inside, while also managing his dwindling air supply. The sight of the pilot's body, bloated and being consumed by marine life, underscores the inherent horrors of existence. This narrative technique echoes the horror elements found in Peter Benchley's Jaws (1974) but is thematically linked to Lara's quest to retrieve her brother's soul from the ocean's depths. Despite nearly suffocating during his ascent from the plane and losing one of the valuable packages, Michael successfully returns to the surface, only to confront the perplexed and angered Colombian militia members, puzzled by his involvement.

In a nearby temple, Lara participates in voodoo rites for her brother, dancing in a trance-like state. Meanwhile, Michael confronts Hilda, the militia leader aggrieved by the loss of the drugs. Suddenly, the narrative shifts into a dreamscape filled with drumbeats, where Michael encounters voodoo spirits such as Marinette and Baron Samedi. These spectral entities taunt Michael's quest for understanding. In his hallucinatory state, he receives a cryptic warning: "If I were you . . . I would save my life." Subsequently, he flees from everyone, including Lara, in the darkness, returning to Fort Salines and his wife.

Following his return from St. Trinity, Michael's hometown undergoes a significant change as its leaders seek to exploit the island for tourism. Meanwhile, Michael's personal life takes a downturn when his wife, Kristin, discovers boarding passes for him and Lara in his luggage. This discovery leads to their divorce, and Kristin moves on with Norman, another academic. Michael's life is further upended as he is forced to live on campus, grappling with feelings of guilt for both his failed family life and his abandonment of Lara. Despite his turmoil, Lara emerges resilient, surviving her ordeal among the Colombian militia and assuming the role of St. Trinity's ambassador to France.

Michael's ultimate failing lies in his inability to confront the depths of danger he willingly embraces. While he ventures into perilous waters with Lara, he shies away from confronting the voodoo underworld of the island, opting instead for a facade of bravery. This pattern of feigned courage mirrors his earlier pretense at hunting. In the novel's climactic scene, Michael accuses Lara of leading him into damnation, but his true struggle is an internal one. He relinquishes the pursuit of spiritual enlightenment, leaving him spiritually adrift. Attempting to straddle the line between risking his soul and preserving his life, Michael finds himself trapped in a state of limbo—"a life suspended on the quivering air."

Throughout the narrative, Stone subtly suggests a metaphysical dimension beyond Michael's comprehension. Despite Michael's ignorance, the verdict rendered upon him is swift and uncompromising.

== Reception ==
Stone's novel, Bay of Souls, was recognized as a Notable Fiction Book of 2003 by The New York Times. The review characterized it as a tightly focused and unsettling narrative. The protagonist, an English professor disillusioned with literary "vitalism," becomes entangled with a captivating woman who believes she has lost her soul and seeks its retrieval through a voodoo ritual.
