= Marie Arana =

Peruvian and American journalist

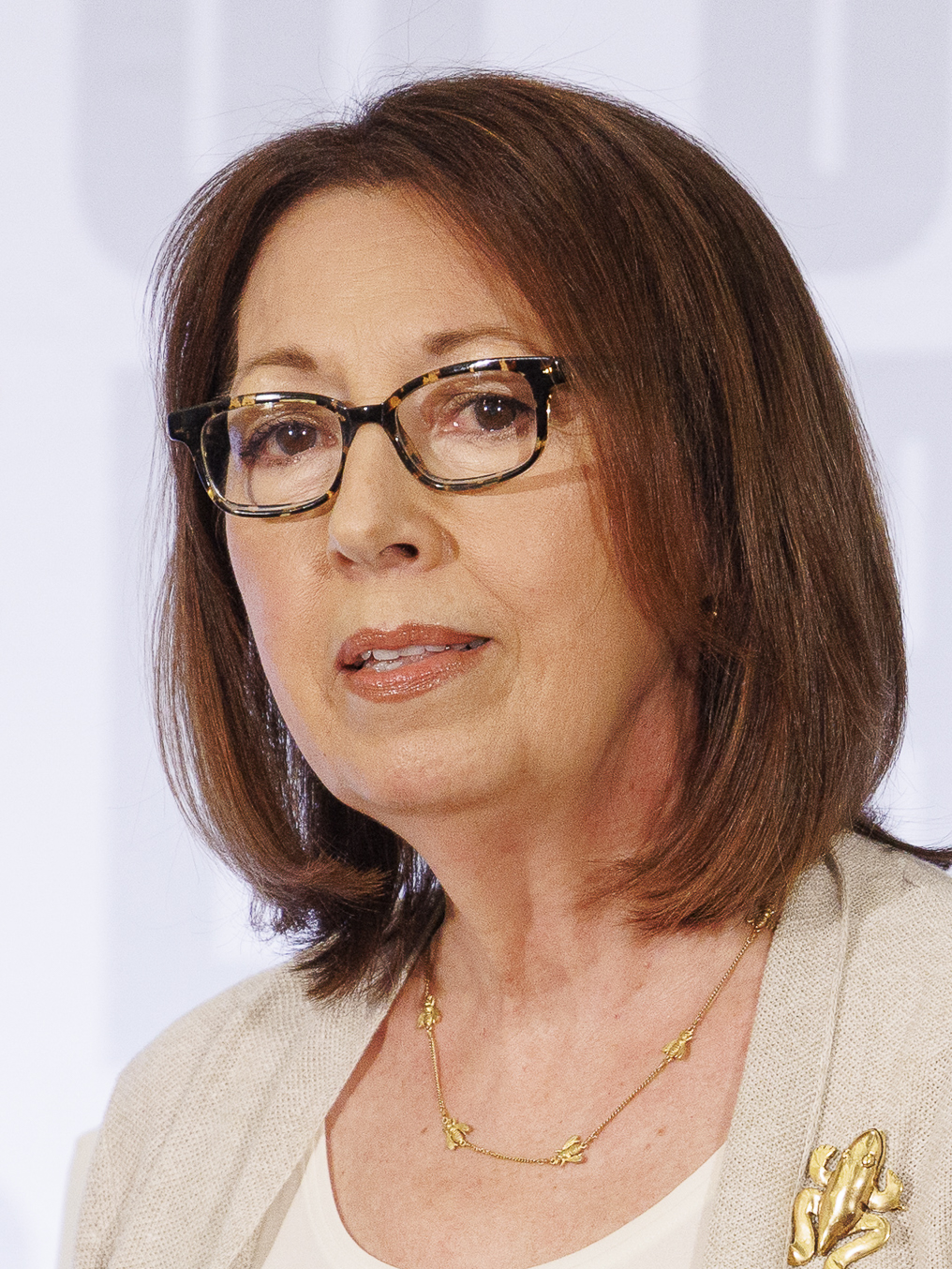
- Marie Arana at the 2024 Library of Congress National Book Festival
- Born: Marie Arana Campbell; Lima, Peru
- Education: Northwestern University (BA); University of Hong Kong (MA)
- Occupations: Author (fiction and nonfiction), Critic
- Spouse(s): Wendell B. Ward, Jr. (1972–1998); Jonathan Yardley (1999–2026)
- Children: 2
- Writing career
- Genre: Literary Criticism
- Notable works: American Chica, Cellophane, Lima Nights, The Writing Life, Bolívar: American Liberator, Silver, Sword, and Stone: Three Crucibles in the Latin American Story, LatinoLand: A Portrait of America’s Largest and Least Understood Minority
- Notable awards: American Chica—National Book Award Finalist 2001; PEN Memoir Award 2002; Cellophane: A Novel— John Sargent Award 2006; Bolívar: American Liberator — Los Angeles Times Prize for Biography 2014; Silver, Sword, and Stone — American Library Association Top Book of the Year 2019; Essential Reading-American Academy of Arts and Letters, Literary Award, 2020; LatinoLand — New Yorker, Top Twelve 2024
- Website: mariearana.net

Marie Arana is a Peruvian American author, editor, journalist, critic, and the inaugural Literary Director of the Library of Congress.

== Personal life ==
Marie Arana was born in Lima, Peru, the daughter of Jorge Enrique Arana Cisneros, a Peruvian-born civil engineer, and Marie Elverine Clapp Campbell, an American from Kansas and Boston, whose family has deep roots in the United States. She moved with her parents to Summit, New Jersey, at the age of nine. She earned a B.A. in Russian at Northwestern University, an M.A. in linguistics at Hong Kong University, and a certificate of scholarship at Yale University in China. At Northwestern she joined Delta Gamma and was honored as Homecoming Queen. She began her career in book publishing, becoming vice president and senior editor at Harcourt Brace and Simon & Schuster.

She has sometimes been credited as Marie Arana-Ward.

== Career ==
For more than a decade she was the editor in chief of "Book World", the book review section of The Washington Post, during which time she instituted the partnership of The Washington Post with First Lady Laura Bush and the Librarian of Congress, James H. Billington, in hosting the annual National Book Festival on the Washington Mall. Arana claimed to be the only Hispanic division head of the newspaper at this time. for many years, directed all programming for the National Book Festival among numerous other programs at the Library. and most recently has been the Literary Director of the Library of Congress. Arana is a Writer at Large for The Washington Post. She is married to Jonathan Yardley, the Post's former chief book critic, and has two children from a previous marriage and two stepchildren.

Arana is the author of a memoir about a bicultural childhood American Chica: Two Worlds, One Childhood (finalist for the 2001 National Book Award as well as the Martha PEN/Albrand Award for the Art of the Memoir); editor of a collection of Washington Post essays about the writer's craft, The Writing Life (2002); and the author of Cellophane (a satirical novel set in the Peruvian Amazon, published in 2006, and a finalist for the John Sargent Prize). Her most recent novel, published in January 2009, is Lima Nights (its Spanish edition [2013] was selected by El Comercio's chief book critic as one of the best five novels of 2013 in Peru. In April, 2013, Simon & Schuster published her book Bolívar: American Liberator, a biography of the South American revolutionary leader and founder Simon Bolivar It won the 2014 Los Angeles Times Book Prize for Biography. She has written introductions for many books, among them a National Geographic book of aerial photographs of South America, Through the Eyes of the Condor. and she is a frequent spokesperson on Hispanic issues, Latin America, and the book industry.

Arana is the President of the 151-year-old Literary Society of Washington and a member of the Board of Trustees of PEN America. She was a member of the Advisory Board for SOUTHCOM, the U.S. Military Command for Central and South America. She has also served on the board of directors of the National Book Critics Circle and the National Association of Hispanic Journalists. She is currently President of the board of directors of the Authors Guild Foundation, and a member of the boards of the PEN/Faulkner Foundation and the American Writers Museum. She is also a member of the Madison Council of the Library of Congress and the Board of Governors of Northwestern University. For many years, she has directed literary events for the International Festivals at the Kennedy Center. She has been a judge for the Pulitzer Prize and National Book Award as well as for the National Book Critics Circle. Her commentary has been published in the New York Times, the Washington Post, the Virginia Quarterly Review, USA Today, Civilization, Smithsonian, National Geographic, and numerous other literary publications throughout the Americas.

Arana was a Fellow at the Hoover Institution at Stanford University in 1996 and then again in 1999, an Invited Research Scholar at Brown University in 2008–2009. In October 2009, Arana received the Alumna Award of the Year at Northwestern University.

In April 2009, Arana was named John W. Kluge Distinguished Scholar at the Library of Congress through 2010. In September 2009, she was elected to the Scholars' Council of the Library of Congress as well as the Board of Directors of the National Book Festival.

Arana was scriptwriter for the Latin American portion of the film "Girl Rising," which describes the life of Senna, a 14-year-old girl in the Andean gold-mining town of La Rinconada. At 17,000 feet above sea level, it is the highest human habitation in the world. The film was part of a campaign to promote the importance of girls' education. Arana's writing about that experience, which was published in The Best American Travel Writing 2013, was named one of "the most gripping and sobering" of the year.

In March 2015, Arana directed the Iberian Suite Festival Literary Series for the Kennedy Center. In the course of seven programs, she featured more than two dozen Spanish-language and Portuguese-language writers from around the world. She has curated the literary programs for the international festivals of the Kennedy Center for many years.

In October 2015, Arana was named Chair of the Cultures of the Countries of the South, an honorary post at the John W. Kluge Center of the Library of Congress. She then became Literary Advisor to the Librarian of Congress as well as director of the National Book Festival.

In 2019, Simon & Schuster published her book, Silver, Sword, and Stone: Three Crucibles in the Latin American Story (Orion Publishers released it in the United Kingdom). The Spanish edition of Bolívar: Libertador Americano was published the same year by Penguin Random House.

In October 2019, Carla Hayden, Librarian of Congress, named her Literary Director of the Library of Congress.

Bolivar and Silver, Sword and Stone have received accusations of hispanophobia, antiespañolismo, stereotyping, sectarianism and misinformation.

In May 2020, Arana was awarded the 2020 Arts and Literature Award by the American Academy of Arts and Letters, which cited her accumulated work as “vivid and elegantly argued writing about Latin America . . . that shows us the dire effects of countries that have not ceased to be colonized for hundreds of years. Arana’s treatment of these sustained attacks is compelling and undeniable.”

In March 2021, the Librarian of Congress Carla Hayden conferred on her the Library of Congress Award for Superior Service.

Arana's eighth book LatinoLand was published on February 20th, 2024. The Washington Post wrote that, "Her fragmented and beautifully written narrative, which washes over readers in a series of portraits, rather than as one continuous story, is a perfect representation of Latino diversity". The New York Times noted that the book had a very fast pace as it covered an expansive history. The New Yorker called “LatinoLand” one of the 12 Must-Read books of 2024.

Arana is the creator and Senior Executive Producer of the nationally broadcast primetime television show about authors, America’s Book Club, which is hosted by cultural leader and patron David Rubenstein and airs weekly on C-SPAN.

== Awards and honors ==
- Christopher Award for Excellence in Editing, 1986, Harcourt Brace Jovanovich
- National Book Award Finalist, 2001, American Chica"
- Best Books of the Year, 2001, New York Times, Washington Post, Los Angeles Times, "American Chica"
- Books for a Better Life Award, 2001, Best Memoir, American Chica
- PEN/ Martha Albrand Award for Memoir, 2001 Finalist, American Chica
- Center for Fiction John Sargent Award for First Fiction, 2006, Cellophane
- Best Books of the Year, 2006, New York Times, Washington Post, Los Angeles Times, Cellophane
- Northwestern University Alumna Award, 2009
- El Comercio, Perú, Cinco Mejores Libros del Año, 2013, "Lima Nights"
- Los Angeles Times Book Award, Best Biography, 2013, "Bolívar: American Liberator"
- Washington Post Best Books of the Year, 2013, "Bolívar: American Liberator"
- Top of the List, American Library Association, Best Nonfiction Book of the Year, 2019, Silver, Sword, and Stone
- American Writers Museum, 2019 Friend of the Writer Award
- Andrew Carnegie Medal for Excellence, Longlist 2020, Silver, Sword, and Stone
- American Academy of Arts and Letters, Literature Award, 2020
- Library of Congress Award for Superior Service, 2021
- Distinguished Leadership for the Americas Award from the Inter-American Dialogue at the Organization of American States (OAS), 2024

== Honorary posts ==
- National Book Critics Circle, Board of Directors, 1996–2000
- National Association of Hispanic Journalists, Board of Directors, 1996–1999
- Stanford University, Hoover Institution on War, Revolution, and Peace, senior fellow, 1996
- Stanford University, Hoover Institution on War, Revolution, and Peace, visiting scholar, 2000
- Brown University, John Carter Brown Library Visiting Scholar, 2009–2010
- Virginia Quarterly Review, Board of Directors, 2011–
- American Writers Museum, Board of Directors, 2016–
- Kluge Scholars Circle, John W. Kluge Center, Library of Congress, 2010–2020
- Kluge Chair in Countries and Cultures of the South, John W. Kluge Center, Library of Congress, 2017–2018
- Library of Congress, Inaugural Literary Director, 2019–2021
- Authors Guild, Board of Directors, 2020–
- United States Southern Command, Dept. of Defense, Advisory Council, 2020–
- PEN/Faulkner Foundation, Board of Directors, 2021–
- PEN America, Board of Trustees, 2021–
- Northwestern University Libraries, Board of Governors, 2021–
- Amazon Conservation Association, Board of Directors, 2022–
- Literary Society of Washington, President, 2023–

== Selected works ==
- —— (2001). American Chica: Two Worlds, One Childhood (1st ed.). Dial Press. ISBN 0-385-31962-2.
- —— (2006). Cellophane. The Dial Press. ISBN 0-385-33664-0.
- —— (2009). Lima Nights. The Dial Press. ISBN 9780385342599.
- Bolivar: American Liberator, Simon & Schuster, 2013, ISBN 9781439110195
- Silver, Sword, and Stone: Three Crucibles in the Latin American Story, Simon & Schuster, 2019, ISBN 9781501104244
- LatinoLand: A Portrait of America’s Largest and Least Understood Minority, Simon & Schuster, 2024 ISBN 9781982184896

=== Editor ===
- The Writing Life: Writers on How They Think and Work: A Collection from The Washington Post Book World, editor, PublicAffairs, 2002, ISBN 9781586481490
- "Introduction by Marie Arana". Through the Eyes of the Condor. Robert B. Haas (photographer). National Geographic. 2007. ISBN 9781426201325.
- Stone Offerings: Machu Picchu's Terraces of Enlightenment, photographs by Mike Torrey, Introduction by Marie Arana, Lightpoint, 2009
