= Children of Light =

1986 novel by Robert Stone

- First edition cover
- Author: Robert Stone
- Language: English
- Genre: Fiction
- Publisher: Alfred A. Knopf
- Publication date: 1986
- Publication place: United States
- Media type: Print (hardback & paperback)
- Pages: 258
- ISBN: 0-394-52573-6
- OCLC: 12974687
- Dewey Decimal: 813.54
- LC Class: PS3569.T6418 C5 1986
- Preceded by: A Flag for Sunrise
- Followed by: Outerbridge Reach

Children of Light is the fourth published novel by U. S. writer Robert Stone. It was published in 1986.

== Background ==
In the front matter of the published version of the novel, Stone acknowledges that during the writing of this novel he received assistance from the National Endowment for the Arts and a residency at the Villa Serbelloni.

Portions of this novel were originally published in Esquire, The Paris Review, Playboy, and TriQuarterly.

== Synopsis ==
The story tracks the lives of Gordon Walker, a failed playwright in his 40s and modestly successful screenwriter-actor, and his old flame Lee Verger, the stage name of Lu Anne Bourgeois Morgen, a successful actress who has paranoid schizophrenia. Gordon, an alcoholic drug addict whose second wife has just left him, goes on location to Mexico where they're filming Walker's screenplay which is an adaptation of Kate Chopin's The Awakening that Lu Anne is starring in. Walker discovers that she has gone off of her medication in an attempt to more fully embody her character.
