= Thomas Williams (writer) =

American writer

- Born: November 15, 1926; Duluth, Minnesota, United States
- Died: October 23, 1990 (aged 63); Dover, New Hampshire, United States
- Occupations: Novelist, Short story writer
- Writing career
- Genre: fiction
- Notable works: The Hair of Harold Roux; Leah, New Hampshire

Thomas Williams (November 15, 1926 – October 23, 1990) was an American novelist. He won one U.S. National Book Award for Fiction—The Hair of Harold Roux split the 1975 award with Robert Stone's Dog Soldiers—and his last published novel, The Moon Pinnace (1986), was a finalist for the National Book Critics Circle Award.

== Life and work ==
Born in Duluth, Minnesota in 1926, Williams and his family moved to New Hampshire when he was a child and he spent most of his life working and writing in that state, although he attended the Iowa Writers' Workshop, the University of Chicago, and studied briefly in Paris. For most of his career he taught at the University of New Hampshire, and published eight novels during his lifetime. His students included among them Alice McDermott and John Irving. Irving wrote an introduction to a posthumous collection of Williams's collected stories, Leah, New Hampshire (1992).

Williams lived in Durham, New Hampshire and died of lung cancer at a hospital in Dover, New Hampshire when he was 63.

Williams is the father of writer and novelist Ann Joslin Williams who is the author of a collection of linked stories called The Woman in the Woods, which won the 2005 Spokane Prize. Joslin Williams' first novel Down From Cascom Mountain, was published in 2011. Like her father, she attended the Iowa Writers’ Workshop and (as of 2011) is a professor at the University of New Hampshire.

== Reception and legacy ==
Because he'd received one of the major US book awards in 1975 and because he was admired as a university writing instructor (as some of his former students can attest), Thomas Williams was a figure of some regard during the 1970s and 1980s when it seems his reputation had reached its peak. Today, Williams continues to be remembered and admired among many writers and students of the craft, but into the 21st century he remains all but unknown to the general reading public. All of his books were out of print until 2011, when The Hair of Harold Roux was reissued, sparking a renewed interest in his work. Stephen King, who had earlier dedicated his 1993 story collection Nightmares & Dreamscapes to Williams, said in a 2011 interview that The Hair of Harold Roux has remained, over the years, one of his favorite books, and one he returns to "again and again."

== Selected bibliography ==
I used to hang out with this guy who taught at the University of New Hampshire who was a mentor of sorts. His name was Thomas Williams [...] We often went fishing and hunting together. A good many of his friends were also writers and so when they'd get together the talk would go from rainbow trout to Eudora Welty to rough grouse. So I just kept my mouth shut. There was a lot more I was going to learn than teach in that group. Tom always said, "just say what you mean as economically as possible and get out," and that's really what I try to do with my lyrics.

— Bill Morrissey, singer & songwriter

Fiction

- Ceremony of Love. Indianapolis: Bobbs-Merrill (1955)
- Town Burning. New York: Macmillan (1959)
  - (reissue: paperback). Anchor Books, 1988. ISBN 978-0-385-24250-9
- The Night of Trees. New York: Macmillan (1961)
  - (reissue: paperback). Ampersand Press & Small Press Distribution (1989). Introduction by John Irving. ISBN 978-0-935331-09-7
- A High New House. New York: Dial Press (1963) – Williams received the "Dial Press Fellowship Award for Fiction" for this collection of short stories
- Whipple's Castle: An American Novel. New York: Random House (1968)
  - (reissue: paperback). Anchor Books, 1988. ISBN 978-0-385-24249-3
- The Hair of Harold Roux. New York: Random House (1974)
- Tsuga's Children. New York: Random House (1977) ISBN 0-394-49731-7
- The Followed Man. New York, NY: Richard Marek (1978) ISBN 978-0-399-90025-9
- The Moon Pinnace. Garden City, NY: Doubleday & Company (1986)
  - (reissue: paperback). Anchor Books, 1988. ISBN 978-0-385-24247-9

Posthumous publications

- Leah, New Hampshire: The Collected Stories of Thomas Williams. New York: William Morrow and Company (1992)
  - (Trade Paperback). Graywolf Press, 1993. Introduction by John Irving.
- The Hair of Harold Roux. Bloomsbury USA (2011; reissue) with an Introduction by Andre Dubus III, Afterword by Ann Joslin Williams. ISBN 978-1-60819-583-1
