= William Faulkner Foundation =

Former education and literary charity (1960–1970)

- Formation: 1960
- Website: Corporate records of the William Faulkner Foundation

The William Faulkner Foundation (1960–1970) was a charitable organization founded by the novelist William Faulkner in 1960 to support various charitable causes, all educational or literary in nature.

== The foundation ==
The foundation programs included the William Faulkner Foundation Award for notable first novel; the Ibero-American Award; a scholarship for first-year University of Virginia undergraduates showing talent in creative writing; scholarships for African-Americans from Mississippi seeking higher education; and monetary gifts to a Boy Scouts of America "Negro summer camp" in Mississippi.

The fund's assets derived primarily from Faulkner's Nobel Prize for Literature, and in later years, an "Associates" group contributed further funds. Faulkner also donated to the foundation, over several stages, all of the manuscripts that he had placed on deposit for safekeeping at the University of Virginia library. In 1968, Harold Ober Associates donated to the foundation "certain original records of William Faulkner."

Founding members of the foundation included William Faulkner, Linton R. Massey Jr., Faulkner's daughter Jill Faulkner Summers and her husband, Paul Summers Jr. After Faulkner's death in 1962, his widow Estelle Faulkner joined the foundation.

The foundation was dissolved in 1970 and all its assets conveyed to the University of Virginia because of a failure of will on the part of the university, which tired of the obligation to award the prizes, and sued in order to divert the assets of the foundation to the university library.

== Writing awards ==
This is about the William Faulkner Award, not the William Faulkner Prize or PEN/Faulkner Award for Fiction

The original intent of the foundation's two literary awards was to support young writers. The William Faulkner Foundation Award for notable first novel was judged by young faculty at the University of Virginia because "Faulkner felt that young persons can best understand and judge young writers.".

The other award, The Ibero-American award, was inspired by Faulkner's visit to Venezuela in 1961, which he had made as part of a cultural diplomacy effort to improve U.S.-Venezuelan relations. Faulkner realized on the trip how many excellent novels by young Latin American writers were not translated into English and wanted the award to ameliorate the situation. The award was originally intended to support young writers, but the eligibility age was abolished soon after the project was undertaken; the only requirement was that the novel had to have been published after World War II. It was judged by individuals from across Latin America, and the winning novel was to be translated into English at Foundation expense.

=== Winners of William Faulkner Foundation Award for Notable First Novel ===
The date shown is the year the award was made, for a book published the year prior.

- 1961 John Knowles, A Separate Peace
- 1962 Lawrence Sargent Hall, Stowaway
- 1963 Reynolds Price, A Long and Happy Life
- 1964 Thomas Pynchon, V.
- 1965 Charles Simmons, Powdered Eggs
- 1966 Cormac McCarthy, The Orchard Keeper
- 1967 Robert Coover, The Origin of the Brunists
- 1968 Frederick Exley, A Fan's Notes
- 1969 Robert Stone, A Hall of Mirrors
- 1970 Larry Woiwode, What I'm Going to Do, I Think

=== Winners of Ibero-American Award ===
1962

- Los enemigos del alma by Eduardo Mallea, Argentina
- Los deshabitados by Marcelo Quiroga Santa Cruz, Bolivia
- Vidas Sêcas by Graciliano Ramos, Brazil
- Coronación by José Donoso, Chile
- Marcos Ramírez by Carlos Luis Fallas Sibaja, Costa Rica
- El Buen Ladrón by Marcio Veloz Maggiolo, Dominican Republic
- El Señor Presidente by Miguel Angel Asturias, Guatemala
- Los Forzados de Gamboa by Joaquín Beleño, Panama
- Hijo de hombre by Roa Bastos, Paraguay
- Los ríos profundos by José María Arguedas, Peru
- La vispera del hombre by René Marqués, Puerto Rico
- El astillero by Juan Carlos Onetti, Uruguay
- Érase un hombre pentafácico by Emma Godoy, Mexico
- Cumboto by Ramón Díaz Sánchez, Venezuela. This novel was selected for translation into English. The translation by John Upton was published by the University of Texas Press, 1969.
