= Lawrence Sargent Hall =

American author

Lawrence Sargent Hall (1915–1993) was an American author.

== Career ==
In 1936, Hall received his BA from Bowdoin College in Brunswick, Maine. In 1941, he received his Ph.D. in English from Yale University. In 1942, he was chief of an Office of Strategic Services (OSS) censorship unit. He taught at several educational institutions, including Deerfield Academy and Yale. In 1946, he retired as a US Navy Reserve lieutenant commander. From 1946 to 1986, he taught English at Bowdoin. In 1956, he was a Carnegie visiting professor at Columbia University. From 1964, he was chairman of the Bowdoin Department of English. In 1986, he retired as Henry Leland Chapman professor. He was an active advocate of the arts in Maine.

His short story "The Ledge" won first place in the 1960 O. Henry Prize Collection, and has appeared in more than 30 anthologies. His novel Stowaway received the 1962 William Faulkner Award for best debut novel. He contributed to several journals including The Hudson Review.

== Published works ==
- Hawthorne: Critic of Society (1943)
- The Ledge (1959)
- Stowaway (1961)
- How Thinking Is Written (1963)
- Seeing And Describing (1966)
- A Grammar of Literary Criticism (2011)
