= A Fan's Notes =

1968 novel by Frederick Exley

- First edition
- Author: Frederick Exley
- Language: English
- Published: 1968 (Harper & Row)
- Publication place: United States
- Media type: Print (hardback & paperback)
- Pages: 385 pp
- Followed by: Pages From A Cold Island

A Fan's Notes is a 1968 novel by Frederick Exley. Subtitled "A Fictional Memoir" and categorized as fiction, the book is semi-autobiographical. In a brief "Note to the Reader" in the opening pages, Exley writes: "Though the events in this book bear similarity to those of that long malaise, my life...I have drawn freely from the imagination and adhered only loosely to the pattern of my past life. To this extent, and for this reason, I ask to be judged a writer of fantasy."

Since its publication the book has been reprinted several times and achieved a cult following.

A Fan's Notes was briefly featured in the documentary film Stone Reader as an example of a brilliant debut novel.

== Synopsis ==
A Fan's Notes is a sardonic account of mental illness, alcoholism, insulin shock therapy and electroconvulsive therapy, and the black hole of sports fandom. Its central preoccupation with a failure to measure up to the American dream has earned the novel comparisons to Fitzgerald's The Great Gatsby. One critic said it had Fitzgerald's later, confessional The Crack-Up "hanging over the shoulder". Beginning with his childhood in Watertown, New York, growing up under a sports-obsessed father and following his college years at the USC, where he first came to know his hero Frank Gifford, Exley recounts years of intermittent stints at psychiatric institutions, his failed marriage to a woman named Patience, successive unfulfilling jobs teaching English literature to high school students, and working for a Manhattan public relations firm under contract to a weapons company, and, by way of Gifford, his obsession with the New York Giants.

Exley's introspective "fictional memoir", a tragicomic indictment of 1950s American culture, examines in lucid prose themes of celebrity, masculinity, self-absorption, and addiction, morbidly charting his failures in life against the electrifying successes of his football hero and former classmate. The title comes from Exley's fear that he is doomed to be a spectator in life as well as in sports. After the book was published, Exley got to know its hero, Frank Gifford. In an interview with American Legends website, the late Mel Zerman, a Harper & Row executive, recalled an evening with the football star and the author: "Frank invited him to a party on one of those occasions when Fred was in New York. He insisted that I come. I believe Fred had probably sent the manuscript of A Fan's Notes to Gifford even before it was published. Fred was no dope when it came to selling books. It was clear that Frank liked him. Why shouldn't he? The book is very worshipful."

== Film adaptation ==
A Fan's Notes was made into a film in 1972 directed by Eric Till and starring Jerry Orbach as Exley.

== Awards and honors ==
- 1968 William Faulkner Foundation Award for notable first novel
- 1969 National Book Award finalist

== Legacy ==
Exley's biographer, Jonathan Yardley, of The Washington Post, called the book "one of the few monuments of postwar American fiction."
