= WUSA (film) =

1970 film directed by Stuart Rosenberg

- Promotional film poster
- Directed by: Stuart Rosenberg
- Screenplay by: Robert Stone
- Based on: A Hall of Mirrors by Robert Stone
- Produced by: Paul Newman; John Foreman
- Starring: Paul Newman; Joanne Woodward; Anthony Perkins; Pat Hingle; Don Gordon; Michael Anderson, Jr. Bruce Cabot; Cloris Leachman; Moses Gunn; Laurence Harvey
- Cinematography: Richard Moore
- Edited by: Bob Wyman
- Music by: Lalo Schifrin
- Distributed by: Paramount Pictures
- Release date: August 19, 1970
- Running time: 115 minutes
- Country: United States
- Language: English

WUSA is a 1970 American drama film directed by Stuart Rosenberg, starring Paul Newman, Joanne Woodward, and Anthony Perkins, and co-starring Laurence Harvey, Cloris Leachman and Wayne Rogers. It was written by Robert Stone, based on his 1967 novel A Hall of Mirrors. The story involves a radio station in New Orleans with the eponymous call sign that is apparently involved in a right-wing conspiracy. It culminates with a riot and stampede at a patriotic pep rally when an assassin on a catwalk opens fire.

== Plot ==
A drifter named Rheinhardt arrives in New Orleans. Seeing a familiar name on a shelter, he goes inside and sees that his old acquaintance Farley is running a scam as a preacher. Farley owes Rheinhardt money and pays some of it. Rheinhardt goes to a bar, where he sees a woman named Geraldine threatened by a pimp who thinks that she is trying to turn tricks on his turf.

Rheinhardt and Geraldine move in together, living in cheap housing surrounded by hippies. He gets a job at a conservative talk radio station called WUSA. The owner, Matthew Bingamon, is a white supremacist. He uses the station to spread propaganda, with the constant refrain that something is wrong in the country and that things were better in the past.

Rheinhardt reads the station's reactionary editorials while he socializes with hippies who detest it. One of his neighbors is an earnest man named Morgan Rainey, whose job is to survey welfare recipients. Rainey relies on a wealthy man named Clotho to guide him to beneficiaries. Clotho introduces Rainey to several people who are scamming the welfare system.

Rainey eventually discovers that Clotho is working for Bingamon, making sure that Rainey's survey finds rampant fraud. WUSA will then use that fraud as content for their editorials. The more that Rainey learns about Bingamon's machinations, the more horrified he becomes. When Bingamon hosts a hate rally, Rainey tries to assassinate him but shoots and kills another man instead. During the ensuing chaos, Rainey attempts to flee with his gun, but the crowd beats him to death.

Rheinhardt is ordered to the lectern to calm the crowd, but he makes a speech that only adds to the din. As Geraldine flees the rally, she is arrested and found with marijuana. Threatened with years in jail for felony possession, she hangs herself in a cell. Rheinhardt visits her grave before leaving town as cynical as he was when he arrived.

== Cast ==
- Paul Newman as Rheinhardt
- Joanne Woodward as Geraldine
- Anthony Perkins as Morgan Rainey
- Laurence Harvey as Farley
- Pat Hingle as Matthew Bingamon
- Don Gordon as Bogdanovich
- Michael Anderson, Jr. as Marvin
- Leigh French as Girl
- Bruce Cabot as King Wolyoe
- Cloris Leachman as Philomene
- Moses Gunn as Clotho
- Wayne Rogers as Minter
- Robert Quarry as Jack Noonan
- Skip Young as Representative Jimmy Snipe
- B.J. Mason as Roosevelt Berry
- Sahdji as Hollywood
- Geoffrey Edwards as Irving, Disc Jockey
- Hal Baylor as "Shorty"
- Clifton James as "Speed", Sailor In Bar
- Tol Avery as Senator
- Paul Hampton as Rusty Fargo
- Jerry Catron as "Sidewinder" Bates

== Reception ==
Anthony Perkins was nominated for best supporting actor of the year by the National Society of Film Critics. In the 1970s, Paul Newman called it "the most significant film I've ever made and the best". Roger Greenspun, reviewing the film for The New York Times, wrote: "If it were an ordinary bad movie (and it is a very bad movie), WUSA might, in spite of the distinguished names, and less distinguished presence, of its leading actors, be dismissed with no more than a nod to the tension between Rosenberg's ponderously emphatic direction, and Robert Stone's ponderously allusive screenplay. I suspect Stone wins out, for WUSA feels more like poor theater than poor moviemaking—so, that it continually suggests a failed version of The Balcony, even though it strives to fall short of The Manchurian Candidate...Despite its obsession with collecting evidence, and its handy school of pseudo-documentary, WUSA fights unreal battles with an unseen enemy. Lacking either the grace of art or the vitality of guerrilla theater, it can offer only the coarsest nourishment—and only to the elaborately self-deceived." Richard Schickel in Life called it a "thin political morality play" compared to the "rich" original novel and lamented the "slickness and conventionality" of Rosenberg's direction, while praising the "first-rate" performances of the leading actors.

== See also ==
- List of American films of 1970
