= A Hall of Mirrors =

1966 novel by Robert Stone

- First edition
- Author: Robert Stone
- Genre: Political fiction, black comedy
- Set in: New Orleans, Louisiana
- Publisher: Houghton Mifflin
- Publication date: 1966
- Awards: PEN/Faulkner Award for Fiction, Houghton Mifflin Literary Fellowship Award
- ISBN: 978-0-395-86028-1
- Followed by: Dog Soldiers

A Hall of Mirrors is the debut novel of American writer Robert Stone. It appeared in December 1966, although the copyright notice in the front matter of the book lists its publication date as 1967.

Set in 1960s New Orleans, the book depicts "the dark side of America that erupted in the sixties" and follows a number of characters who are tied to a right-wing radio station, the civil rights movement, and 1960s counterculture. The book won the 1967 William Faulkner Foundation Award for notable first novel, a predecessor of the PEN/Faulkner Award for Fiction, and the Houghton Mifflin Literary Fellowship Award.

== Plot summary ==
Rheinhardt, an alcoholic former virtuoso clarinetist, arrives in New Orleans, where he meets Geraldine, an attractive former prostitute with a distinctive facial scar and an appealingly easygoing demeanor. Desperate for money and booze, Rheinhardt takes a job as a disc jockey and radio commentator for a new right-wing radio station called WUSA, whose unironic taglines include "The Voice of an American's America" and "The Truth Shall Make You Free." Though Rheinhardt wholeheartedly embraces his role at the station and delivers its messages with gusto, his eccentric friends, general outlook, and lifestyle of drinking and smoking marijuana belie his affinity for the socially-liberal counterculture of the 1960s. Nonetheless, his affiliation with WUSA brings him into contact with a group of powerful, manipulative ultra-conservatives and race baiters who plan to use the radio station to racially divide the city and combat the civil rights movement, goals of which Rheinhardt is oblivious.

Meanwhile, Morgan Rainey, a dour former social worker, takes a job conducting site visits for City Hall's survey of welfare recipients. Though Rainey initially believes he's engaged in a noble (if last-ditch) effort to improve services for the poor, he quickly realizes that the people dubiously assisting him in his efforts are part of a cynical plot to remove blacks from the state's welfare rolls. Rainey solemnly vows to fight back against the politicians of City Hall and its enablers at WUSA. He first tries to enlist Reinhardt, his neighbor, to help, but he ultimately vows to take decisive action to derail a major public event that WUSA sees as its coming out party.

== Characters ==
- Rheinhardt – A down-and-out alcoholic with a tendency to talk too much and antagonize people, Rheinhardt arrives in New Orleans after abandoning a promising career as a Juilliard-trained clarinetist and a failed marriage. He takes a job as a radio personality at far-right radio station WUSA, despite his political ambivalence and nihilism.
- Geraldine – A pretty former prostitute with a pimp-inflicted scar across the side of her face. She falls in love with Rheinhardt after arriving in New Orleans and vainly tries to balance his self-destructive behavior while creating a new life and identity for herself.
- Morgan Rainey – A disillusioned social worker from a political family in south Louisiana who learns that he's been a pawn in a City Hall plot to remove blacks from welfare roles and endeavors to fight back.
- Farley the Sailor / Brother Jensen – A Nova Scotian former sailor, hairdresser, actor, diet consultant, and "cosmic philosopher," Farley flees New York and again crosses paths with Rheihardt after assuming the character of Brother Jensen, an Evangelical proselytizer on WUSA.
- Mr. Clotho - An African-American property owner and political fixer operating in the predominantly black Backatown neighborhood, Mr. Clotho aids Rainey in surveying welfare recipients as part of a politically-motivated hustle called "the Big Store" aimed at achieving City Hall's racist goal of removing blacks from the welfare rolls.
- Roosevelt Berry - A journalist with the African American newspaper The Delta Advance who, despite liquor and skepticism, helps Morgan Rainey see through the plots of Mr. Clotho and City Hall.
- Matthew Bingamon - Owner of the radio station WUSA, which inflames racial tensions and hatred through fear-mongering, racially-tinged news items and radical right-wing commentary.
- Jack Noonan - WUSA's station manager and Rheihardt's counterpart, he is insecure about his job and constantly mistreated by his boss, Bingamon, and Bingamon's hangers-on.
- King Walyoe – A lecherous, washed-up former Hollywood actor and cowboy who helps Bingamon promote the WUSA rally.
- Woody – A violent pimp who cuts Geraldine's face.

== Influence and significance ==
In addition to winning the 1967 William Faulkner Foundation Award for notable first novel and the Houghton Mifflin Literary Fellowship Award, the book has been called "one of the two best first novels I have ever read" wrote Wallace Stegner, "fantastic, brilliant, and fast-paced" said Joyce Carol Oates, and a "prodigiously talented piece of writing" by the New York Times' Christopher Lehmann-Haupt.

In 1970, A Hall of Mirrors was adapted into a movie, WUSA, with a screenplay by Stone and starring Paul Newman, Joanne Woodward, Anthony Perkins, and Laurence Harvey.

Stone was admitted to the Stanford's Creative Writing Program after submitting part of A Hall of Mirrors in manuscript form with his application.

== See also ==
- Counterculture of the 1960s
- Civil rights movement
- Right-wing populism
