= Frederick Exley =

American novelist

- Born: Frederic Earl Exley; March 28, 1929; Watertown, New York
- Died: June 17, 1992 (aged 63); Alexandria Bay, New York
- Occupation: Novelist
- Spouse(s): Francena Fritz (1959–62); Nancy Glenn (1967–71)
- Children: 2
- Writing career
- Language: English
- Period: 1968–1992
- Notable work: A Fan's Notes

Frederick Earl "Fred" Exley (March 28, 1929 – June 17, 1992) was an American writer. His fictional memoir A Fan's Notes received critical acclaim and awards. He followed it up with two more fictional memoirs.

== Early life and education ==
Exley was born (Frederic) March 28, 1929, in Watertown, New York. He was the third of four children, including a twin sister, Frances, born to Earl and Charlotte. His father, who died in 1945 when Exley was 16, was a celebrated former athlete and local basketball coach whose legacy would be a dominating influence on Exley's early life. A car accident the following year injured Exley and prevented him from graduating high school on schedule. Exley had a brief stint at Katonah High School in Katonah, New York, where he was named to the conference all-star basketball team.

Exley entered Hobart College in the pre-dental program in 1949. The next year he transferred to the University of Southern California, where he began to follow the career of fellow student and future football legend Frank Gifford. Exley avoided being drafted in 1951 when he failed his Selective Service examination on account of injuries sustained in the car accident.

In 1952, Exley dropped out of USC and moved to New York City to find employment, only to return a year later to complete a BA in English.

== Early career ==
He returned to New York to work in public relations for New York Central Railroad. After a year there he relocated to their Chicago office, then began working for Rock Island Railroad in the same capacity. Exley soon took over as managing editor of the railroad's employee magazine, The Rocket, where his first published writing appeared.

== Itinerant life and instability ==
Exley was institutionalized three times in the 1950s after entering an itinerant period marked by acute alcoholism, obsession with New York Giants football, mental instability and schizophrenia that was to provide much of the autobiographical material for his first book, A Fan's Notes. In 1958, Exley was admitted briefly to Stony Lodge, a private mental institution in Westchester County, New York, where he met Francena Fritz, whom he began courting. Soon after, he was admitted to Harlem Valley State Hospital, the model for the Avalon Valley facility mentioned in A Fan's Notes. It was there that Exley began writing in earnest. In 1959, he was released from Harlem Valley and married Fritz on October 31. They moved to Greenwich, Connecticut and Exley was offered a teaching position at a school in Port Chester, New York. In 1960 his first daughter, Pamela Exley, was born.

In 1961 Exley received a provisional appointment as clerk and crier of the courts in Jefferson County, New York, where a lawyer friend, Gordon Phillips (the model for "the Counselor" in A Fan's Notes), asked Exley to forge a signature on a check for one of his clients, an action that led to Phillips' disbarment.

== Divorce and A Fan's Notes ==
In 1962, Fritz obtained a divorce from Exley at her father's request. Several years of intermittent teaching jobs in Clayton, Gouverneur, and Indian River, New York followed. His alcoholism growing worse, Exley began a decade of briefly-held jobs and institutionalization, and spent time vacationing on Singer Island in Riviera Beach, Florida, while continuing to work on A Fan's Notes. In 1964, Exley sent the completed manuscript for A Fan's Notes to Houghton Mifflin who rejected it, and to Joe Fox at Random House, who suggested an agent, Lynn Nesbit. Nesbit shopped the manuscript around and, after it was rejected by at least a dozen publishers, she finally sold it to David Segal at Harper & Row.

In 1965, Exley, then 36, met the 20-year-old Nancy Glenn while on vacation in Palm Beach Shores, Florida. She was working as a bookkeeper for The Buccaneer, her husband's resort. The following year, Glenn separated from her husband and moved in with Exley, beginning a long relationship that saw many temporary separations and reconciliations. She became pregnant while Exley was employed at The Palm Beach Post's copy desk; they married on September 13, 1967, and Glenn gave birth to Exley's second daughter, Alexandra Exley, on January 12, 1968. Exley and Glenn divorced on January 8, 1971.

A Fan's Notes was published in September 1968, and although early sales were not good, its release prompted widespread critical acclaim. The novel, about a longtime failure who makes good by finally writing a memoir about his pained life, was a finalist for the National Book Award, and received the William Faulkner Award for best first novel, and the National Institute of Arts and Letters Rosenthal Award.

== Pages From a Cold Island ==
In 1969, Exley moved into an apartment on 19th Street in Manhattan, spending much of his time at the Lion's Head bar at 59 Christopher Street. In 1970, Exley's mother purchased a small house in Alexandria Bay, New York, and he temporarily moved in, though he still spent time in Florida working on Pages From a Cold Island. Charlotte's home was to become Exley's home base for the next 20 years. In the fall of that year he interviewed Gloria Steinem in Key Biscayne Florida. The resulting essay, entitled "Saint Gloria & the Troll", was published in Playboy in July 1974. It earned Exley an Editorial Award for the year's best nonfiction piece.

His second novel, Pages From a Cold Island, was published by Random House in 1975, to considerably less acclaim than his debut. The book primarily concerns Exley's life in Florida; an afternoon with Steinem; a semester spent teaching at the Iowa Writer's Workshop at the University of Iowa; and an homage to the life and career of literary critic and author Edmund Wilson, who lived near Watertown at Talcottville in upstate New York.

== Last Notes From Home ==
Exley traveled to the Hawaiian island of Lanai, where he began work on the final novel of his semi-autobiographical trilogy, Last Notes From Home. In May 1977, Rolling Stone publisher and co-founder Jann Wenner paid Exley $20,000 to publish up to six excerpts of the work-in-progress. The magazine published three excerpts, in June 1977, October 1978 and February 1979. The following year, Exley's papers were acquired by collector Robert C. Stevens and donated to the University of Rochester. In 1984, Exley's major debt was temporarily relieved when he received a Guggenheim Foundation grant of $21,000. Frank Gifford, who was portrayed as a hero and object of Exley's envy in A Fan's Notes, invited Exley to attend Super Bowl XXI in Pasadena, California, where the New York Giants defeated the Denver Broncos.

Last Notes From Home was published by Random House in September 1988. The final volume in Exley's trilogy focuses on his relationship with his older brother, William, a Vietnam veteran who died in Hawaii in 1973 after a battle with cancer.

Soon after, Exley began work on a spy thriller to be titled Mean Greenwich Time, but he did not come close to completing it.

== Final years and death ==
Exley moved in with his aunt Frances Knapp in Alexandria Bay, and became very ill while traveling to London for a journalism assignment. After falling into poor health in late 1990 and being hospitalized with congestive heart failure, Exley cared for his ailing aunt who eventually died in 1991. The following year Exley suffered two strokes and died at Edward John Noble Hospital in Alexandria Bay on June 17, 1992. His ashes were interred at Brookside Cemetery in Watertown, New York, next to his parents.

== Film adaptation ==
A 1972 film adaptation of A Fan's Notes, directed by Eric Till and starring Jerry Orbach, was screened at the 1972 Cannes Film Festival and released in Canada, but never put into general release in the US. Exley stated that the film "bore no relationship to anything I'd written."

== Posthumous recognition ==
A biography of Exley, Misfit: The Strange Life of Frederick Exley, by Pulitzer Prize-winning critic Jonathan Yardley, appeared in 1997. Yardley's central thesis is that Exley was a brilliant one-book writer. Yardley also wrote the preface to the Modern Library reissue of A Fan's Notes.

In 2010, author Brock Clarke released a novel entitled Exley. In the novel, the main character, Miller, is obsessed with Exley. Entertainment Weekly gave the novel a B+ and stated: "Frederick Exley's classic 1968 account of his epic alcoholism, A Fan's Notes, bears the oxymoronic subtitle 'A Fictional Memoir.' It is the space between those words, between real and fabricated memory, that Clarke examines. . . With humor as black as Exley's liver, Clarke picks apart the fictions we tell one another — and those we tell ourselves."

Also in 2010, and in part in recognition of Clarke's novel, Alex Kudera began a series of interviews with novelists on the topic of Exley and his influence on their work. His first interview was with Eleanor Henderson, whose Ten Thousand Saints went on to be named one of the 10 Best Books of 2011 by The New York Times. He has also interviewed The Funny Man author John Warner, among others. Exley himself admired few of his contemporaries. Mel Zerman, the late Harper & Row executive, recalled: "He had very little to say about most writers that was good. He liked William Styron but maybe that was because they shared an agent."

In 2012, Matthew Ricke and Brandon Chamberlin opened a bar called "the Exley" in Williamsburg, Brooklyn, named after the author of their favorite book, A Fan's Notes.

== Bibliography ==
=== Novels ===
- A Fan's Notes (1968, Harper & Row)
- Pages From a Cold Island (1975, Random House)
- Last Notes From Home (1988, Random House)

=== Articles ===
- "He's a Pro," SPORT, July 1969 (excerpt from A Fan's Notes).
- "Poem from a Man at Middle Age," Esquire, May 1973.
- "Good-bye, Edmund Wilson," The Atlantic Monthly, March 1974 (excerpt from Pages from a Cold Island).
- "Saint Gloria & the Troll," Playboy, July 1974 (excerpt from Pages from a Cold Island).
- "To Oahu with the 'Wild Geese'," Rolling Stone, June 30, 1977 (excerpt from Last Notes from Home).
- Letter to the editor about William Styron in Esquire, April 11, 1978.
- "James Seamus Finbarr O'Twoomey," Rolling Stone, October 5, 1978 (excerpt from Last Notes from Home).
- "Ms. Robin Glenn," Rolling Stone, February 22, 1979 (excerpt from Last Notes from Home).
- "A Fan's Notes Goes to Super Bowl XIII," Inside Sports, October 1979.
- Review of Bill Barich's Laughing in the Hills, for New York, August 11, 1980.
- Review of Clive James's Unreliable Memoirs, for New York, April 13, 1981.
- "Holding Penalties Build Men," Inside Sports, November 1981.
- "A Case for Backing Cincinnati – and for Ice Fishing," New York Times, January 24, 1982.
- "Just Who Is 'the Game' in Professional Football?" New York Times, August 22, 1982.
- "Football '83: Side Lines," Rolling Stone, September 15, 1983.
- "The Natural," GQ, February 1984.
- "The Laureate of Alexandria Bay," Esquire, March 1986.
- "Brother in Arms," Rolling Stone, July 17 and 31, 1986 (excerpt from Last Notes from Home).
- "A Fan's Note," American Film, September 1986.
- "The Giants Will Fail and Here's Why," New York Times, November 30, 1986.
- "A Fan's Further Notes," Esquire, June 1987.
- Article (title unknown, about Alexandria Bay fishermen) for Adirondack Life, ca. 1989.
- "Women and Football," The Cable Guide, November 1989.
- "If Nixon Could Possess the Soul of this Woman, Why the Hell Can't I?" Esquire, December 1989.
- "Tell 'em Frankie's here," The Sunday Correspondent, London, July 1, 1990.
- "The Last Great Saloon" (about The Lion's Head saloon) for GQ, December 1990.
- "Exley's Last Notes," Esquire, August 1993 (posthumous extract from unfinished spy novel).
