= Dog Soldiers (novel) =

1974 novel by Robert Stone

- First edition cover
- Author: Robert Stone
- Language: English
- Genre: Fiction
- Publisher: Houghton Mifflin
- Publication date: 1974
- Publication place: United States
- Media type: Print
- Pages: 342
- ISBN: 0-395-18481-9
- OCLC: 948202
- Dewey Decimal: 813.54 74.11441
- LC Class: PS3569.T6 418
- Preceded by: Hall of Mirrors
- Followed by: A Flag For Sunrise

Dog Soldiers is a novel by Robert Stone, published by Houghton Mifflin in 1974. The story features American journalist John Converse, a Vietnam correspondent during the war, Merchant Marine sailor Ray Hicks, Converse's wife Marge, and their involvement in a heroin deal gone bad. It shared the 1975 U.S. National Book Award for Fiction with The Hair of Harold Roux by Thomas Williams (split award). Dog Soldiers was named by Time magazine one of the 100 best English-language novels, 1923 to 2005.

The book was adapted into the 1978 film Who'll Stop the Rain starring Nick Nolte with a script co-written by Stone.

== Plot ==
Dog Soldiers deals with the fall of the counterculture in America, the rise of mass cynicism and the end of the optimism of the 1960s.

California has moved on from the Summer of Love to post-Manson paranoia. Converse, a writer only able to observe, waits for inspiration as a war correspondent in Vietnam. Symbolic of his moral corruption is his decision to traffic in heroin, which the 1960s counterculture never embraced, as they did marijuana and LSD.

Converse involves a former friend, Ray Hicks, in the smuggling deal. Hicks will hide the heroin on the Merchant Marine vessel he works on when he ships from Vietnam to Oakland, California and deliver the dope to Converse's wife Marge in Berkeley, California. The novel's primary complication unfolds when Hicks arrives in the States and realizes that he was discovered before he arrived and is being aggressively followed. Unsure whether Converse was double-crossed by his suppliers or Converse himself betrayed him, Hicks elects to go on the run with the heroin, taking Marge as insurance. The novel's action follows Hicks and Marge's evasion of Converse and his suppliers, and Hicks's attempts to sell the dope, south through California to the desert.

Once an all-American marine, now a lone wolf, Hicks is a survivalist and an autodidact trying to apply to himself Zen Buddhism, martial arts and the philosophy of Nietzsche. Marge is a painkiller junkie and guilt-ridden mother who takes tickets at a porn theater because it is ironic; she presents herself as an advocate of freedom, both sexual and of speech. She had agreed with Converse to do the heroin deal. Their pursuer may intend to arrest them and keep the drugs off the street, or allow his associates to kill them and keep the supply for himself, but no one can tell for sure. His thugs may be merely well-informed drug thieves or legitimately on the fringe of the law enforcement world.

== Inspiration ==
Stone acknowledges having borrowed heavily from his experiences among the Merry Prankster milieu led by novelist Ken Kesey, with whom Stone became acquainted while he was a student in the graduate creative writing workshops at Stanford University. According to Gregory Stephenson, author of a number of Beat studies, the character of Ray Hicks was inspired by Beat Generation icon and Merry Prankster Neal Cassady — Hicks is "an idealized Cassady figure". Numerous details from the novel are based on Cassady and his exploits and the environs of Ken Kesey's home in La Honda, California, an informal commune depicted in the writings of Hunter S. Thompson, Tom Wolfe, and Allen Ginsberg.
