= Jonathan Yardley =

American book critic (1939–2026)

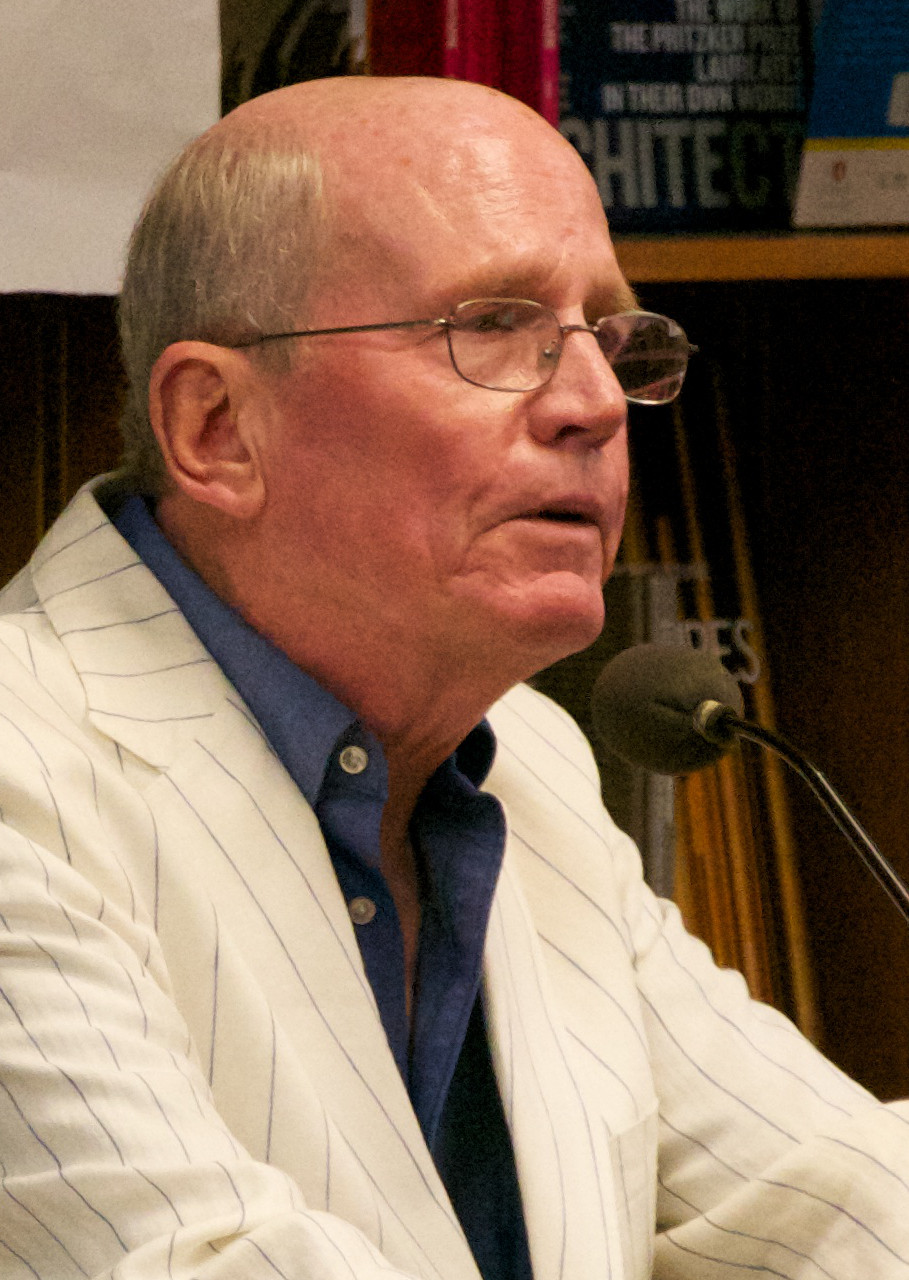
- Yardley in 2011
- Born: October 27, 1939; Pittsburgh, Pennsylvania, U.S.
- Died: November 20, 2026 (aged 87); Washington, D.C., U.S.
- Education: University of North Carolina, Chapel Hill (BA)
- Occupations: Book critic, author
- Employer(s): New York Times, Miami Herald, Washington Post
- Known for: Frank criticism
- Spouses: Rosemary Roberts (m. 1961; div. 1975) Susan L. Hartt (m. 1975; div. 1998) Marie Arana (m. 1999)
- Children: Jim Yardley and William W. Yardley
- Awards: Pulitzer Prize for Criticism 1981

Jonathan Yardley (October 27, 1939 – November 20, 2026) was an American author and book critic at The Washington Post from 1981 to December 2014, and held the same post from 1978 to 1981 at The Washington Star. In 1981, he received the Pulitzer Prize for Criticism.

== Background and education ==
Yardley was born on October 27, 1939, in Pittsburgh and spent his childhood in Chatham, Virginia. His father, William Woolsey Yardley, was a teacher of English and the classics, as well as an Episcopal minister and a headmaster at two East Coast private schools. His mother was Helen Gregory Yardley.

Yardley graduated from the University of North Carolina at Chapel Hill in 1961. There, he was a member of St. Anthony Hall and was the editor of the student newspaper, The Daily Tar Heel, in his senior year.

== Career ==
After leaving Chapel Hill, Yardley interned at the New York Times as an assistant to James Reston, the columnist and Washington Bureau chief. From 1964 to 1974, Yardley worked as an editorial writer and book reviewer at the Greensboro Daily News; during this time, he was also a Nieman Fellow at Harvard University for the 1968–1969 academic year, where he studied American literature and literary biography. From 1974 to 1978, Yardley served as the book editor of the Miami Herald. From 1978 to 1981, he was the book critic at the Washington Star, receiving a Pulitzer Prize for distinguished criticism in 1981. In 1981, Yardley became a book critic and columnist at the Washington Post.

Yardley is the author of several books, among them biographies of Frederick Exley and Ring Lardner. His memoir about his family, Our Kind of People, describes his parents' 50-year marriage and casts a wry eye on the American WASP experience. He edited H. L. Mencken's posthumous literary and journalistic memoir, My Life as Author and Editor. He penned introductions to books by Graham Greene, A. J. Liebling, Booth Tarkington and others.

Yardley is known for simultaneously having been a frank critic and a starmaker. Among the talents he brought to public light and championed are Michael Chabon, Edward P. Jones, Anne Tyler, William Boyd, Olga Grushin and John Berendt. He wrote a famously harsh review of Joe McGinniss's book The Last Brother: The Rise and Fall of Teddy Kennedy, saying "Not merely is it a textbook example of shoddy journalistic and publishing ethics; it is also a genuinely, unrelievedly rotten book, one without a single redeeming virtue, an embarrassment that should bring nothing except shame to everyone associated with it."

In February 2003, Yardley began a series called "Second Reading", described as "an occasional series in which The Post's book critic reconsiders notable and/or neglected books from the past". Every month or so, for the next seven years, he published essays about notable books from the past, many of which had gone out of print or were in some way seen as worth reading again. This series included a highly critical look at The Catcher in the Rye in 2004. A collection of the Second Reading columns was published by Europa Editions in July 2011.

On December 5, 2014, Yardley announced his retirement as book critic of the Post.

== Publications ==
=== Books ===
- Second Reading: Notable and Neglected Books Revisited. New York: Europa Editions, 2011. ISBN 978-1-60945-008-3
- Monday Morning Quarterback. Lanham: Rowman & Littlefield Publishers, Inc., 1998. ISBN 0-8476-9204-3 ISBN 978-0847692040
- Misfit: The Strange Life of Frederick Exley. New York: Random House, 1997. ISBN 0-679-43949-8 ISBN 978-0679439493
- Out of Step: Notes From a Purple Decade. New York: Random House, 1993. ISBN 0-517-10628-0 ISBN 978-0-517-10628-0
- States of Mind: A Personal Journey Through the Mid-Atlantic. Villard Publishing, 1993. ISBN 0-394-58911-4 ISBN 978-0394589114
- Our Kind of People: The Story of an American Family. New York: Grove Press, 1989. ISBN 1-55584-174-0 ISBN 978-1555841744
- Ring: A Biography of Ring Lardner. New York: Random House, 1977. ISBN 0-394-49811-9 ISBN 978-0394498119

=== As editor ===
- H.L. Mencken, My Life as Author and Editor. New York: Knopf, 1993. ISBN 0-679-41315-4 ISBN 978-0679413158

== Awards ==
Yardley was awarded the 1981 Pulitzer Prize for Criticism. Yardley has been a Nieman Fellow. Yardley was awarded an honorary doctorate of humane letters by George Washington University in 1987, and a distinguished alumnus award by the University of North Carolina at Chapel Hill in 1989.

== Personal life and death ==
Yardley was married to biographer and novelist Marie Arana, the former editor of The Washington Post Book World. Earlier marriages to Rosemary Roberts and Susan L. Hartt ended in divorce. His sons with his first wife, Jim Yardley and William Yardley, are former New York Times reporters, and William writes for the Los Angeles Times as well. As of 2026, Jim was an assistant managing editor for The New York Times.

Yardley died in Washington, D.C., on November 20, 2026, at age 87.

== See also ==
- Michael Dirda
- Ron Charles
