= Robert Stone (novelist) =

American writer (1937–2015)

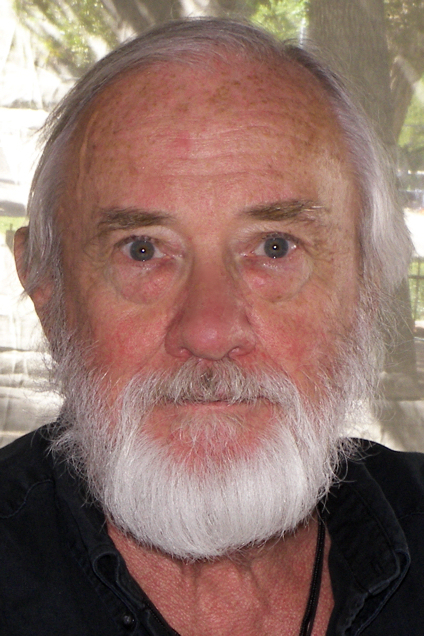
- Stone at the 2010 Texas Book Festival
- Born: Robert Anthony Stone; August 21, 1937; Brooklyn, New York, U.S.
- Died: January 10, 2015 (aged 77); Key West, Florida, U.S.
- Education: New York University
- Occupations: Author, journalist
- Writing career
- Notable works: Dog Soldiers, A Flag for Sunrise, Outerbridge Reach
- Notable awards: National Book Award 1975
- Movements: Naturalism, Stream of consciousness

Robert Anthony Stone (August 21, 1937 – January 10, 2015) was an American novelist, journalist, and college professor.

He was five times a finalist for the National Book Award for Fiction, which he did receive in 1975 for his novel Dog Soldiers. Time magazine included this novel in its list 100 Best English-language Novels from 1923 to 2005. Stone was also twice a finalist for the Pulitzer Prize and once for the PEN/Faulkner Award.

During his lifetime Stone received material support and recognition including Guggenheim and National Endowment for the Humanities fellowships, the five-year Mildred and Harold Strauss Living Award, the John Dos Passos Prize for Literature, and the American Academy and Institute of Arts and Letters Award. Stone also offered his own support and recognition of writers during his lifetime, serving as Chairman of the PEN/Faulkner Foundation Board of Directors for over thirty years.

Stone's best-known work is characterized by action-tinged adventures, political concerns and dark humor. Many of his novels are set in unusual, exotic landscapes of raging social turbulence, such as the Vietnam War; a post-coup violent banana republic in Central America; Jim Crow-era New Orleans, and Jerusalem on the verge of the millennium.

== Life ==
Stone was born in Brooklyn, New York on August 21, 1937, to Homer Stone, who worked for the New Haven Railroad, and Gladys Grant, a teacher. Stone's parents separated when he was an infant. Stone came from a "family of Scottish Presbyterians and Irish Catholics who made their living as tugboat workers in New York harbor". Until the age of six he was raised primarily by his mother, who suffered from schizophrenia; after she was institutionalized, he spent several years in a Catholic orphanage. In his short story "Absence of Mercy", which Stone has called autobiographical, the protagonist Mackay is placed at age five in an orphanage described as having had "the social dynamic of a coral reef".

Stone was expelled from a Marist high school during his senior year for "drinking too much beer and being 'militantly atheistic'". Soon afterwards, Stone joined the Navy for four years. At sea he traveled to many locales, including Antarctica and Egypt. But according to Stone, it was his first shore leave in a pre-Fidel Castro era Havana, Cuba that impacted his future writing:

"Havana was my first liberty port, my first foreign city. It was 1955 and I was 17, a radio operator with an amphibious assault force in the U.S. Navy ... At the time, I was struck less by the frivolity of Havana than by its unashamed seriousness ... All this Spanish tragedy, leavened with Creole sensuality, made Havana irresistible. Whether or not I got it right, I have used the film of its memory ever since in turning real cities into imaginary ones."

In the early 1960s, he briefly attended New York University; worked as a copy boy at the New York Daily News; married and moved to New Orleans; and held the Stegner Fellowship (1962–1963) at the Stanford University Creative Writing Center, where he began writing a novel. Although he associated with the influential post-Beat Generation writer Ken Kesey and other Merry Pranksters, he was not a passenger on the famous 1964 bus trip to New York, contrary to some media reports. Living in New York at the time, he met the bus on its arrival and accompanied Kesey to an "after-bus party" whose attendees included a dyspeptic Jack Kerouac.

Although he never completed an academic degree, Stone taught in the creative writing programs at various university programs around the United States. He held a lectureship at the Johns Hopkins University Writing Seminars during the 1993–1994 academic year before moving to Yale University. He taught creative writing for the 2006–2007 academic year at Beloit College. For the 2010–2011 academic year, Stone held an endowed chair in the English department at Texas State University. He was also active in many of the writing seminars in and around Key West, Florida where he resided during the winter months. Stone was appointed an honorary director of the Key West Literary Seminar, serving in that capacity during the final decade of his life.

Stone was a heavy smoker, but quit in his 40s. However, at age 72, just after the publication of his second short-story collection Fun With Problems, Stone admitted that he suffered from severe emphysema: "It's my punishment for chain-smoking," he says. He recalled his reaction to being told of the harm smoking was now causing him in old age: "I'm not going to know I'm alive!".

According to his literary agent, Neil Olson, Stone died from chronic obstructive pulmonary disease on January 10, 2015, in Key West, where he and his wife had spent their winters for more than twenty years. He was 77. At the time of his death, Stone was survived by his wife of 55 years, Janice, and their two adult-age children, a daughter named Deirdre and a son named Ian.

== Publications ==
During his lifetime, Robert Stone published eight novels, two story collections, and a memoir, Prime Green: Remembering the Sixties. Since his death, a book of collected nonfiction has appeared, and a volume of his work (reprinting together Dog Soldiers, A Flag For Sunrise, and Outerbridge Reach) has been included in the acclaimed Library of America series.

=== Fiction ===
Stone's first novel, A Hall of Mirrors, appeared in 1967. It won both a Houghton Mifflin Literary Fellowship, and a William Faulkner Foundation Award for best first novel. Set in New Orleans in 1960 and based partly on actual events, the novel depicted a political scene dominated by right-wing racism, but its style was more reminiscent of Beat writers than of earlier social realists: alternating between naturalism and stream of consciousness. It was adapted as a film, WUSA (1970) based on Stone's screenplay of his own novel. The novel's success led to a Guggenheim Fellowship and began Stone's career as a professional writer.

In 1971 he traveled to Vietnam as a correspondent for an obscure British journal called INK. His time there served as the inspiration for his second novel, Dog Soldiers (1974), which features a journalist smuggling heroin from Vietnam. It shared the 1975 U.S. National Book Award with The Hair of Harold Roux by Thomas Williams. Dog Soldiers was adapted into the film Who'll Stop the Rain (1978) starring Nick Nolte, from a script that Stone co-wrote.

Stone's third book, A Flag for Sunrise (1981), was published to unanimous critical praise and moderate commercial success. The story follows a wide cast of characters as their paths intersect in a fictionalized banana republic based on Nicaragua. The novel was a finalist for the PEN/Faulkner Award for Fiction and the Pulitzer Prize. A Flag for Sunrise was twice a finalist for the National Book Award, once following its hardcover release and again the next year when it was reissued in paperback.

In contrast to the grand, somewhat satirical adventure epics Stone is commonly associated with, his next two novels were smaller-scale character studies: the misfortunate tale of a Hollywood movie actress in Children of Light, and an eccentric at the midst of a circumnavigation race in Outerbridge Reach (based loosely on the story of Donald Crowhurst), published in 1986 and 1992 respectively. The latter was a finalist for the National Book Award for 1992. Bear and His Daughter, published in 1997, is a short story collection. It was a finalist for the Pulitzer Prize for Fiction in 1998.

Stone returned to the complex political novel with Damascus Gate (1998), about a man with messianic delusions caught up in a terrorist plot in Jerusalem. The novel was a finalist for the National Book Award for 1998. It was followed in 2003 by Bay of Souls. The final novel that Stone published in his lifetime was Death of the Black-Haired Girl which appeared in 2013.

=== Nonfiction ===
Prime Green: Remembering the Sixties (2007) is Stone's memoir discussing his experiences in the 1960s counterculture. "Pleasant goofing" was the way Stone described those days in a Washington Post interview from 1981. This autobiographical work begins with his days in the Navy and ends with his days as a correspondent in Vietnam. Besides Ken Kesey, this work features Stone's insights on Neal Cassady, Allen Ginsberg, and Jack Kerouac from his time spent traveling with them. Prime Green also reveals Stone's perspective on drugs and their effects. Following his death in 2015, a critic noted, in a snapshot retrospective view of Stone's career, that "even his experiments with drugs in the early sixties led Stone to understand that his view on life is going to remain religious no matter what." And Stone himself confirmed this view, when he told the Washington Post in 1981:

But through his experimentation with drugs in the early 1960s, [Stone] has said, he confronted a deep religious sensibility. "I discovered that my way of seeing the world was always going to be religious — not intellectual or political — viewing everything as a mystic process."

== Works ==
Novels

- 1967: A Hall of Mirrors
- 1974: Dog Soldiers (novel) — winner of National Book Award
- 1981: A Flag for Sunrise — finalist for Pulitizer prize; PEN/Faulkner Award finalist; twice a finalist for the National Book Award
- 1986: Children of Light
- 1992: Outerbridge Reach — finalist for the National Book Award
- 1998: Damascus Gate — finalist for the National Book Award
- 2003: Bay of Souls
- 2013: Death of the Black-Haired Girl

Short story collections

- 1997: Bear and His Daughter — finalist for Pulitzer prize
- 2010: Fun with Problems

Memoirs

- 2007: Prime Green: Remembering the Sixties

Screenplays

- 1970: WUSA (screenplay, based on A Hall of Mirrors)
- 1978: Who'll Stop the Rain (screenplay, based on Dog Soldiers; co-author)

Nonfiction

- 2020: The Eye You See With: Selected Nonfiction (posthumously published; edited by Madison Smartt Bell)
