= Madison Smartt Bell =

American author

- Born: August 1, 1957 (age 69); Nashville, Tennessee, U.S.
- Education: Princeton University, Hollins University
- Occupation: Author
- Writing career
- Notable work: All Souls' Rising

Madison Smartt Bell (born August 1, 1957, Nashville, Tennessee) is an American novelist. While established as a writer by several early novels, he is especially known for his trilogy of novels about Toussaint Louverture and the Haitian Revolution, published 1995–2004.

== Early life and education ==
Raised in Nashville, Bell is a graduate of Princeton University, where he won the Ward Mathis Prize and the Francis LeMoyne Page award, and Hollins University, where he won the Andrew James Purdy fiction award. He later lived in New York City and London before settling in Baltimore, Maryland.

== Career ==
Bell is a professor of English at Goucher College in Towson, Maryland, where he was Director of the Creative Writing Program from 1998 to 2004. He taught in various creative writing programs, including the Iowa Writers' Workshop, the Poetry Center of the 92nd Street Y, and the Johns Hopkins Writing Seminars.

In addition, he has written essays and reviews for Harper's, The New York Review of Books, and the New York Times Book Review.

His papers are held at Princeton University and at East Carolina University. The latter contains papers related to novels and other writing early in his career, up to 1990.

== Personal life ==
Bell is married to poet Elizabeth Spires, who also teaches at Goucher College. They have a daughter, Celia Dovell Bell.

== Awards ==
- All Souls' Rising, a novel about Toussaint Louverture and the Haitian Revolution, was a finalist for the 1995 National Book Award and the 1996 PEN/Faulkner Award. It won the 1996 Anisfield-Wolf Award for the best book of the year dealing with matters of race.
- He won a Strauss Living Award from the American Academy of Arts and Letters.

== Works ==
=== Fiction ===
- The Washington Square Ensemble (novel) (Viking Press, 1983)
- Waiting For The End Of The World (novel) (Ticknor & Fields, 1985)
- Straight Cut (novel) (Ticknor & Fields, 1986)
- Zero db (short fiction) (Ticknor & Fields, 1987)
- The Year Of Silence (novel) (Ticknor & Fields, 1987)
- Soldier's Joy (novel) (Ticknor & Fields, 1989)
- Barking Man (short fiction) (Ticknor & Fields, 1990)
- Doctor Sleep (novel) (Harcourt Brace Jovanovich, 1991)
- Save Me, Joe Louis (novel) (Harcourt Brace Jovanovich, 1993)
- All Souls' Rising (novel, Haiti Trilogy, part 1) (Pantheon, 1995)
- Ten Indians (novel) (Pantheon, 1996)
- Master of the Crossroads (novel, Haiti Trilogy, part 2) (Pantheon, 2000)
- Anything Goes (novel) (Pantheon, 2002)
- The Stone That the Builder Refused (novel, Haiti Trilogy, part 3) (Pantheon, 2004)
- Devil's Dream (novel) (Pantheon, 2009)
- The Color of Night (novel) (Vintage, 2011)
- Zig Zag Wanderer (short fiction) (Concord Free Press, 2013)
- Behind the Moon (novel) (City Lights Publishers, 2017)

=== Biography ===
- Toussaint Louverture: A Biography (Pantheon, 2007)
- Child of Light: A Biography of Robert Stone (Doubleday, 2020)

=== Other nonfiction ===
- Narrative Design: A Writer's Guide to Structure (textbook) (W.W. Norton, 1997)
- Narrative Design: Working with Imagination, Craft, and Form (Norton, 2000)
- Lavoisier in the Year One: The Birth of a New Science in an Age of Revolution (Norton, 2005)
- Charm City: A Walk Through Baltimore (Crown, 2007)
