= Outerbridge Reach =

1992 novel by Robert Stone

First edition (publ. Ticknor & Fields)

Outerbridge Reach is a 1992 novel by American novelist Robert Stone. It was his fifth published novel.

== Plot ==
The novel follows the story of a copywriter who enters an around-the-world solo boat race, and a filmmaker who makes him the subject of a documentary. Stone reportedly stated that it is partly based on the real-life story of Donald Crowhurst, though the novel does not mention Crowhurst by name. In a note from the author that appears in the first few attached pages preceding the work, Stone states as follows: "An episode in the book was suggested by an incident that actually occurred during a circumnavigation race in the mid-1960s. This novel is not a reflection on that incident but fiction referring to the present day."

== Achievements ==
=== Awards and honors ===
Outerbridge Reach was a National Book Critics Circle Award nominee. It was also a finalist for The National Book Award.

=== Commercial success ===
Stone's novel was also a commercial success, spending nine weeks on the bestseller list in its cloth edition.
