= List of awards and nominations received by Emilia Clarke =

Emilia Clarke awards and nominations
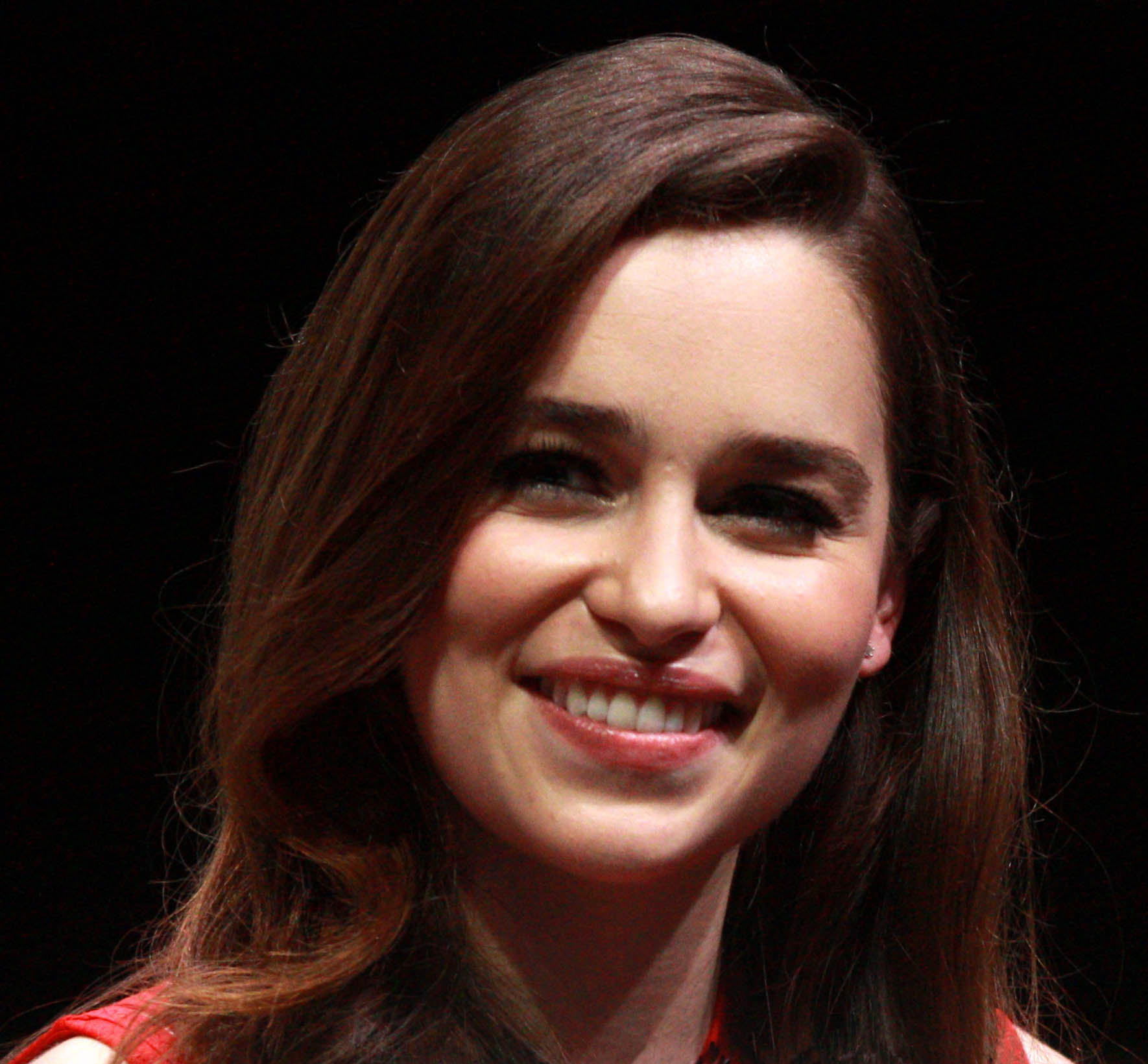
- Clarke at the 2013 San Diego Comic-Con
Awards and nominations
Award	Wins	Nominations
BreakTudo Awards	0	1
Britannia Awards	1	1
Critics' Choice Television Awards	0	3
Empire Awards	1	1
EWwy Awards	1	1
Golden Nymph Awards	0	1
Gracie Awards	1	1
IGN Awards	0	1
IGN People's Choice Awards	0	1
Jupiter Awards	0	1
MTV Movie & TV Awards	0	4
Nickelodeon Kids' Choice Awards	0	1
People's Choice Awards	0	3
Primetime Emmy Awards	0	4
Satellite Awards	0	1
Saturn Awards	1	2
Scream Awards	1	2
Screen Actors Guild Awards	0	7
Screen International Stars of Tomorrow	1	1
SFX Awards	1	1
Shorty Awards	1	3
Teen Choice Awards	0	3
Time 100	1	1
Young Hollywood Awards	0	1

Totals (Note: Certain award groups do not simply award one winner. They acknowledge several different recipients, have runners-up, and have third place. Since this is a specific recognition and is different from losing an award, runner-up mentions are considered wins in this award tally. For simplification and to avoid errors, each award in this list has been presumed to have had a prior nomination.)
- Wins: 12
- Nominations: 47

Emilia Clarke is a British actress known for her roles in film, television and theater. Over her career she has received various accolades including a Britannia Award as well as nominations for seven Actors Awards, three Critics' Choice Television Awards, and four Primetime Emmy Awards. Clarke and her mother were appointed as Members of the Order of the British Empire (MBE) for their charity work in 2024.

Clarke's first credited television role was a bit part in the BBC One series Doctors in 2009. She appeared in the 2010 television film Triassic Attack and was named a Star of Tomorrow by the film magazine Screen International. She was subsequently cast as Daenerys Targaryen in the HBO series Game of Thrones in 2010, a role for which she was nominated for the Primetime Emmy Award for Outstanding Supporting Actress in a Drama Series three times (2013, 2015, and 2016) and Primetime Emmy Award for Outstanding Lead Actress in a Drama Series for the final season in 2019. Clarke won the Saturn Award for Best Actress on Television in 2019. She also, along with the other Game of Thrones cast members, received the Empire Hero Award in 2015 and seven nominations for the Screen Actors Guild Award for Outstanding Performance by an Ensemble in a Drama Series (2012, 2014–2018, and 2020).

Clarke played Sarah Connor in the 2015 science fiction action film Terminator Genisys for which she received a nomination for the Teen Choice Award for Choice Female Summer Movie Star. She starred alongside Sam Claflin in the 2016 romantic drama film Me Before You, which gained them nominations for a MTV Movie & TV Award and Teen Choice Award for their performances. For her role of Qi'ra in the 2018 film Solo: A Star Wars Story, she was nominated for Favorite Butt-Kicker at the 2019 Kids' Choice Awards. In 2019, Time magazine recognised Clarke as one of the 100 most influential people in the world in the "Artist" category. She also won the Britannia Award for British Artist of the Year at the 2018 ceremony. Clarke has also been honoured for her charitable work. In 2019, she won the Shorty Do Good Award for Best Comedy Video for a video she made to spread awareness of her charity SameYou and the Royal College of Nursing.

== Major associations ==
=== Actor Awards ===
Year	Category	Nominated work	Result	Ref.
2011	Outstanding Ensemble in a Drama Series	Game of Thrones	Nominated (Note: Nomination shared with other main cast members)	
2013	Outstanding Ensemble in a Drama Series	Game of Thrones	Nominated	
2014	Outstanding Ensemble in a Drama Series	Game of Thrones	Nominated	
2015	Outstanding Ensemble in a Drama Series	Game of Thrones	Nominated	
2016	Outstanding Ensemble in a Drama Series	Game of Thrones	Nominated	
2017	Outstanding Ensemble in a Drama Series	Game of Thrones	Nominated	
2019	Outstanding Ensemble in a Drama Series	Game of Thrones	Nominated	

=== Critics' Choice Awards ===
Year	Category	Nominated work	Result	Ref.
Critics' Choice Television Awards
2013	Best Supporting Actress in a Drama Series	Game of Thrones	Nominated	
2016	Best Supporting Actress in a Drama Series	Game of Thrones	Nominated	
2018	Best Supporting Actress in a Drama Series	Game of Thrones	Nominated	

=== Emmy Awards ===
Year	Category	Nominated work	Result	Ref.
Primetime Emmy Awards
2013	Outstanding Supporting Actress in a Drama Series	Game of Thrones (episode: "And Now His Watch Is Ended")	Nominated	
2015	Outstanding Supporting Actress in a Drama Series	Game of Thrones (episode: "The Dance of Dragons")	Nominated	
2016	Outstanding Supporting Actress in a Drama Series	Game of Thrones (episode: "Book of the Stranger")	Nominated	
2019	Outstanding Lead Actress in a Drama Series	Game of Thrones (episode: "The Last of the Starks")	Nominated	

== Awards and nominations ==
Awards and nominations received by Emilia Clarke
Award	Year	Category	Work	Result	Ref(s)
Empire Awards	2015	Empire Hero Award	Game of Thrones	Won (Note: Award shared with other main cast members)	
EWwy Awards	2011	Best Supporting Actress – Drama	Game of Thrones	Won	
Golden Nymph Awards	2012	Outstanding Actress in a Drama Series	Game of Thrones	Nominated	
Golden Tomato Awards	2019	Fan Favorite Actress	Emilia Clarke	Nominated	
Gracie Awards	2012	Outstanding Female Rising Star in a Drama Series or Special	Game of Thrones	Won	
IGN Awards	2011	Best TV Actress	Game of Thrones	Nominated	
IGN People's Choice Awards	2011	Best TV Actress	Game of Thrones	Nominated	
Jupiter Awards	2016	Best International Actress	Terminator Genisys	Nominated	
MTV Movie & TV Awards	2017	Best Performance in a Show	Game of Thrones	Nominated	
MTV Movie & TV Awards	2017	Tearjerker	Me Before You	Nominated (Note: Nomination shared with Sam Claflin)	
MTV Movie & TV Awards	2018	Best Hero	Game of Thrones	Nominated	
MTV Movie & TV Awards	2019	Best Performance in a Show	Game of Thrones	Nominated	
National Film Awards	2020	Best Actress	Last Christmas	Nominated	
Nickelodeon Kids' Choice Awards	2019	Favorite Butt-Kicker	Solo: A Star Wars Story	Nominated	
People's Choice Awards	2014	Favorite Sci-Fi/Fantasy TV Actress	Game of Thrones	Nominated	
People's Choice Awards	2016	Favorite Sci-Fi/Fantasy TV Actress	Game of Thrones	Nominated	
People's Choice Awards	2017	Favorite Sci-Fi/Fantasy TV Actress	Game of Thrones	Nominated	
Satellite Awards	2013	Best Supporting Actress – Series, Miniseries or Television Film	Game of Thrones	Nominated	
Saturn Awards	2015	Best Supporting Actress on Television	Game of Thrones	Nominated	
Saturn Awards	2019	Best Actress on Television	Game of Thrones	Won	
Scream Awards	2011	Scream Award for Breakout Performance – Female	Game of Thrones	Won	
Scream Awards	2011	Scream Award for Best Ensemble	Game of Thrones	Nominated	
Screen International Stars of Tomorrow	2010	UK Star of Tomorrow	Triassic Attack	Won	
SFX Awards	2013	Best Actress	Game of Thrones	Won	
Shorty Do Good Awards	2018	Influencer & Celebrity Partnerships	Emilia Clarke Takes You Behind the Scenes of Game of Thrones to Support Royal College of Nursing	Gold Distinction	
Shorty Do Good Awards	2018	Comedy Video	Emilia Clarke Takes You Behind the Scenes of Game of Thrones to Support Royal College of Nursing	Finalist	
Shorty Do Good Awards	2019	Comedy Video	Emilia Clarke x Omaze	Won	
Teen Choice Awards	2015	Choice Summer Movie Star: Female	Terminator Genisys	Nominated	
Teen Choice Awards	2016	Choice Movie Liplock	Me Before You	Nominated	
Teen Choice Awards	2018	Choice Summer Movie Actress	Solo: A Star Wars Story	Nominated	
Young Hollywood Awards	2014	Fan Favorite Actor – Female	Game of Thrones	Nominated	

== Special awards ==
Organizations	Year	Notes	Result	Ref.
Britannia Awards	2018	British Artist of the Year	Honored	
TIME Magazine	2019	100 Most Influential People in the World	Honored	
King Charles III	2024	Member of the Order of the British Empire (MBE) (Note: with her mother Jennifer for their charity work with SameYou.)	Honored	
