= House of Sand =

House of Sand may refer to:

- A House of Sand, a 1962 American film
- The House of Sand, a 2005 Brazilian film
- House of Sand, a 1986 novel by Barbara Rowan
- "House of Sand", a song by Elvis Presley from Paradise, Hawaiian Style

== See also ==
- House of Sand and Fog (disambiguation)
