= House of Sand and Fog =

House of Sand and Fog may refer to:

- House of Sand and Fog (novel), a 1999 novel by Andre Dubus III
- House of Sand and Fog (film), a 2003 film adaptation of the novel, starring Jennifer Connelly, Ben Kingsley and Shohreh Aghdashloo.
- House of Sand and Fog (soundtrack), the soundtrack album from the film
