= Townie: A Memoir =

Memoir by Andre Dubus III

Townie - A Memoir
- First edition
- Author: Andre Dubus III
- Subject: Memoir
- Publisher: W. W. Norton & Company
- Publication date: 2011
- Publication place: United States
- Preceded by: The Garden of Last Days (2008)
- Followed by: Dirty Love (2013)

Townie – A Memoir is a 2011 memoir by American novelist and short story writer Andre Dubus III. It details Dubus' childhood in Haverhill, Massachusetts and his frequently turbulent relationship with his father Andre Dubus II.

== Summary ==
Dubus writes about growing up in Haverhill, Massachusetts in the 1970s after his parents divorced. Dubus and his three siblings spent much of their time alone while their mother worked to support the family. Dubus describes his years as a boxer, how it saved his life, and led him to writing.

== Reception ==
Writing for The Guardian, William Skidelsky described Townie as "a mesmerising work, one of the best accounts I've encountered of violence and its causes". In its review, the New York Times complimented Dubus for "not leaning on easy redemption" in the story's conclusion and avoiding "the usual signifiers of today’s ’70s Nostalgia Industrial Complex, no peace-sign key chains or smiley-face T-shirts, none of the goofy stoners and ditsy girls in tube tops that American television viewers have become accustomed to".

The memoir was a finalist on the Indie's Choice "Book of the Year for Adult Non-fiction" list in 2012. It also made it onto several publication's "Best Book" lists in 2011, including Salon, Esquire and Publishers Weekly.
