= Vadim Perelman =

Ukrainian-Canadian-American film director

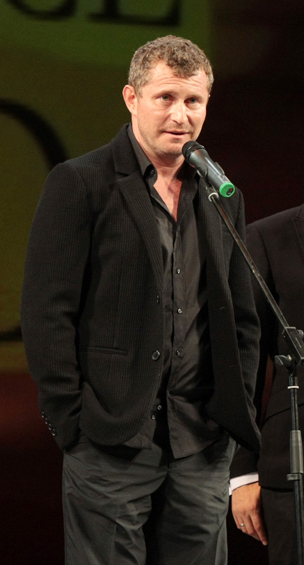
- Perelman at the Odesa International Film Festival in 2011
- Born: September 8, 1963 (age 63); Kyiv, Ukrainian SSR, Soviet Union
- Occupation: Film director

Vadim Perelman (Ukrainian: Вадим Валерійович Перельман, romanized: Vadym Valeriyovych Perelman; born 8 September 1963) is a Ukrainian-Canadian-American film director. Perelman made his feature film directorial debut in 2003 with House of Sand and Fog, following a career as a commercial director. The film, nominated for three Academy Awards, also marks his first screenplay credit. Perelman was drawn to the story, having been shaped by his own immigrant experience.

== Early life and work ==
Born in Kyiv, Ukrainian SSR (now in Ukraine), Perelman was an only child. His family is of Jewish descent. When Perelman was nine, his father was killed in a car accident. Five years later, he and his mother were granted permission to leave Kyiv and lived in Vienna for two months before moving to Rome, a transfer point in the 1980s for Jewish émigrés from the USSR.

Remembering that period, Perelman likens himself to the kids in Luis Buñuel's Los Olvidados — a street urchin "always searching for a hunk of bread or a scam to pull." He supported himself and his young mother in this fashion for a year. When a Canadian visa finally came, they left for that country where Perelman would ultimately build a new life and start his career.

Following some rather tumultuous teenage years, Perelman finally began to concentrate on his formal education. He attended the University of Alberta, majoring in physics and maths, before a sophomore-year class in film-making changed his focus. Moving to Toronto, he studied film at Ryerson University's School of Image Arts for two years, before launching his own Toronto-based production house, called Canned Films. After honing his skills directing and editing music videos, he decided to move to Los Angeles to further his career.

Over the next three years, Perelman directed multinational television commercials for Microsoft, General Motors, Panasonic, Nike, Airwalk, AT&T, Sony PlayStation, Coors and MasterCard, and music videos including Kelly Clarkson's "Because of You."

== Film directorial career ==
Perelman is known for being selective about his projects. "I don’t want to spend a year of my life working on a film that does not resonate with me on an emotional level. Since great scripts are a rare commodity, I realized that I have to create my own opportunities and not wait for the right project to come along — for fate to smile upon me."

With this in mind, Perelman began to option the film rights to literary works. He discovered House of Sand and Fog by Andre Dubus III before it was an acclaimed bestseller and an Oprah selection. "I closed that book after I finished it, and through the tears managed to call my agent to check into the rights." Despite his lack of experience, Perelman convinced Dubus to give him the rights, telling him, "You're going to get all these people coming at you, but they will all have agendas. I have nothing to lose, and I will fight for this to the death." Perelman got Shawn Otto to adapt the novel for the screen, brought Ben Kingsley and Jennifer Connelly into the project and raised financing for what would become his first feature film. Harvey Weinstein offered $500,000, a producer credit and a script of his choosing from the Miramax slate to let Todd Field direct instead, but Perelman declined. Weinstein would acquire the film's UK distribution rights. DreamWorks acquired domestic distribution rights and released the film to critical acclaim.

Perelman's second feature film, The Life Before Her Eyes, was shot in 2006 in Connecticut. The film, independently financed by 2929 Productions, stars Uma Thurman and Evan Rachel Wood. It is based on the novel of the same name by Laura Kasischke. Emil Stern adapted the book for the screen. Perelman produced the film along with Aimee Peyronnet and Anthony Katagas.

In 2007, he was attached to the film adaptation of Ayn Rand's Atlas Shrugged.

In 2021 he was awarded the Fiddler on the Roof Award in the Cinematography category.

== Films ==
- House of Sand and Fog (2003)
- The Life Before Her Eyes (2007)
- Yolki 5 (2016)
- Buy Me (2018)
- Persian Lessons (2020)
- The Passenger (2026)
