= Emilia Clarke =

English actress (born 1986)

Emilia Clarke MBE
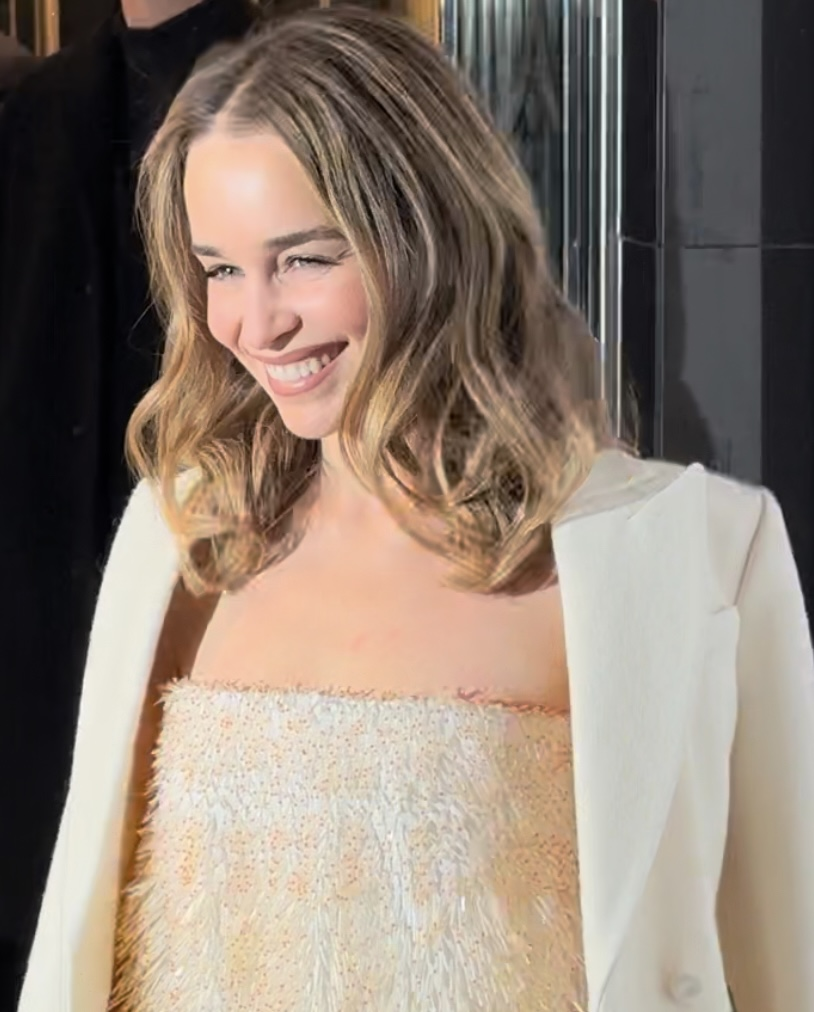
- Clarke in 2023
- Born: Emilia Isobel Euphemia Rose Clarke; 23 October 1986 (age 40); London, England
- Education: Drama Centre London
- Occupation: Actress
- Years active: 2000–present
- Notable work: Full list
- Mother: Jennifer Dodd Clarke
- Awards: Full list

Emilia Isobel Euphemia Rose Clarke (born 23 October 1986) is an English actress. She achieved international recognition for her role as Daenerys Targaryen in the HBO fantasy series Game of Thrones (2011–2019), for which she received nominations for four Primetime Emmy Awards. She is also widely known for playing Sarah Connor in the science-fiction film Terminator: Genisys (2015) and Qi'ra in the film Solo: A Star Wars Story (2018), and for starring in the romantic dramas Me Before You (2016) and Last Christmas (2019).

Clarke's television debut was a guest appearance in the BBC One medical soap opera Doctors in 2009, at age 22. Clarke made her Broadway debut as Holly Golightly in the play Breakfast at Tiffany's (2013), and played Nina in a West End production of The Seagull. She also played G'iah in the Marvel Cinematic Universe miniseries Secret Invasion (2023).

== Early life and education ==
Clarke was born on 23 October 1986 in London. She grew up in Oxfordshire. Her father, Peter Roderick "Rick" Clarke, was a theatre sound engineer from Wolverhampton who died in 2016 from cancer. Her mother, Jennifer Susan Dodd Clarke, is a businesswoman who is the vice-president for marketing at a management-consultancy firm and the director of The Anima Foundation, which is a charity to help young people in Ghana. She has a younger brother, Bennett, who works in the entertainment industry and was part of the camera department for Game of Thrones. Clarke's maternal grandmother was from India. She ascribes her family's "history of fighters" to their Indian ancestry, which she stated to be a source of pride and integral to her identity: "The fact that [my grandmother] had to hide her skin colour, essentially, and try desperately to fit in with everyone else must've been incredibly difficult".

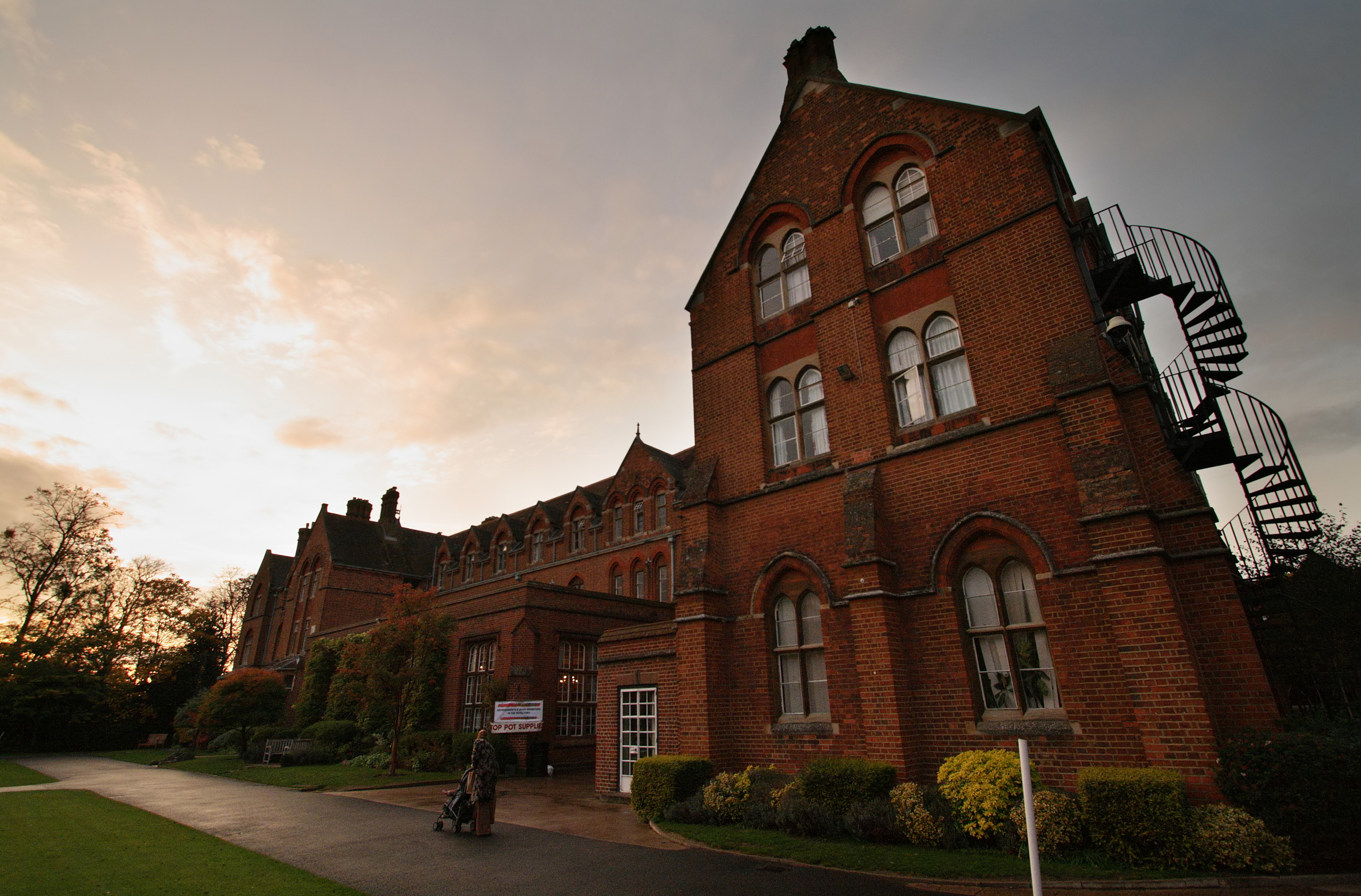
St Edward's School Oxford, which Clarke attended

Clarke stated that her mother had rules when she was growing up: "Don't do drugs, don't have sex, and don't touch your eyebrows", and that she was bullied as a child for "having ridiculous eyebrows". Clarke stated that "My father always told me—Never trust anyone whose TV is bigger than their bookshelf". Clarke became interested in acting at the age of three years after seeing a production of the musical Show Boat. When she was ten, her father took her to a West End audition for The Goodbye Girl, a musical by Neil Simon.

Clarke was educated at Rye St Antony School, Headington, and at St Edward's School, Oxford, which she left in 2005. In a 2016 interview with Time Out, she stated "I went to posh boarding schools, but I wasn't the posh girl at the posh boarding schools". She also stated that most of the people at St. Edward's School were Conservative, as a consequence of which she and some of her friends often felt like outsiders. After she had finished school, Clarke unsuccessfully applied to the Royal Academy of Dramatic Art, the London Academy of Music and Dramatic Art, and the Guildhall School of Music and Drama. She worked and travelled before enrolling at Drama Centre London, where she graduated in 2009.

== Career ==
=== 2000–2010: Beginnings ===
Clarke started to act in stage productions while attending school. She appeared in student productions of Twelfth Night and West Side Story while attending St Edward's School. After taking a sabbatical year, she was accepted into Drama Centre London. Clarke also appeared in the 2009 production of Sense, co-produced by theatre company Company of Angels and Drama Centre London.

One of her first film roles was in Drop the Dog, a University of London student short film. She graduated from drama school in 2009. She worked at various non-acting jobs after graduating while auditioning for roles. She starred in two commercials for the charity Samaritans, portraying a domestic abuse victim. Her first credited television role was a bit part in a 2009 episode of the British soap opera Doctors. Clarke was cast in her first professional film role, playing Savannah in the 2010 television film Triassic Attack. The film was released in November 2010 on the Syfy channel in the United States where it received negative reviews. Despite the film's reviews, she was named a "UK Star of Tomorrow" by the film magazine Screen International.

=== 2011–2019: Game of Thrones and worldwide recognition ===
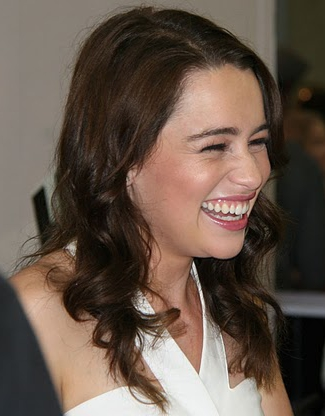
Clarke at Comic Con in 2011

Clarke was cast in her third professional role in 2010, as Daenerys Targaryen in the HBO fantasy series Game of Thrones. It is based on the fantasy book series A Song of Ice and Fire by George R. R. Martin. Daenerys is one of the last surviving members of House Targaryen, which had ruled Westeros from the Iron Throne for nearly three hundred years prior to being ousted. Actress Tamzin Merchant was originally cast for the part of Daenerys. When the pilot episode was re-shot in early 2010, Merchant was replaced by Clarke. The show ran from April 2011 until May 2019, with Clarke portraying Daenerys throughout all eight seasons.

Clarke received critical acclaim for her portrayal of Daenerys, which traces an arc from frightened girl to powerful woman. Matthew Gilbert of The Boston Globe called her scenes "mesmerising", adding that "Clarke doesn't have a lot of emotional variety to work with as Daenerys, aside from fierce determination, and yet she is riveting." Emily St. James for The A.V. Club commented on the difficulty of adapting such an evolution from page to screen, but concluded that Clarke was able to "more than seal the deal here."

Clarke said by being cast as Daenerys, she had avoided the "typical bonnet duty that you have to go through as a young British actress". In 2017, she reportedly became one of the highest-paid actors on television, earning between £1.2 and £2 million per episode of Game of Thrones. (Note: The Hollywood Reporter reported the salary per episode to be £1.2 million while The Daily Telegraph reported £2 million per episode.) In 2019, she said she had been uncomfortable acting nude in her first experience at age 23 of a large film set, but had since become "a lot more savvy" about what level of nudity is needed for a scene. Clarke received multiple award nominations and wins for her role of Daenerys. She was nominated three times for Primetime Emmy Award for Outstanding Supporting Actress in a Drama Series in 2013, 2015, and 2016. At the 2019 Emmys, she was nominated for Outstanding Lead Actress in a Drama Series, her first nomination in the category.

In addition to the television show, she lent her voice and likeness to the 2014 video game of the same name. She also made a cameo appearance during Kit Harington's monologue on Saturday Night Live in April 2019. She said in a November 2019 NPR interview that if she "were to get stereotyped as the mother of dragons, I could ask for worse. It's really quite wonderful." In a 2021 interview with theSkimm, Clarke stated that she would change the way her character died.

=== 2012–2021: Varied roles, franchise films, and publishing ===
Clarke's first film role was in the short film Shackled (2012). The film was featured in the 2020 Amazon Prime Video horror anthology series Murder Manual. The same year, she starred alongside Elliott Tittensor in the comedy film Spike Island. It details a group of friends who try to get to the namesake island of The Stone Roses 1990 concert. The movie was originally distributed only in the United Kingdom but was subsequently picked up by Level 33 Entertainment for North American distribution in March 2015. From March to April 2013, she played Holly Golightly in a Broadway production of Breakfast at Tiffany's, a role requiring her to perform a nude scene. The production, along with her performance, received mixed reviews from critics. Later that year, she also starred in the black comedy-crime drama film Dom Hemingway alongside Jude Law.

In May 2013 Clarke was cast in a film adaptation of the novel The Garden of Last Days. James Franco was set to direct and star in the film; however, he left the project two weeks before filming after creative differences with the film distributor Millennium Entertainment. In a 2019 interview with The Hollywood Reporter, Clarke said she was offered the role of Anastasia Steele in Fifty Shades of Grey. She said she turned down the part because of the nudity required.

In 2013, she was cast as Sarah Connor in the science fiction action film Terminator Genisys (2015). The film, which also stars Arnold Schwarzenegger, Jai Courtney, and Jason Clarke, received unfavourable reviews from critics but was a box office success, grossing over $440 million worldwide. Clarke was nominated for Teen Choice Award for Choice Summer Movie Star – Female and Best International Actress at the 2016 Jupiter Awards for her performance.

She starred as the female lead, opposite Sam Claflin, in the film adaptation of the best-selling novel of the same name, Me Before You. The film which was released on 3 June 2016 and directed by Thea Sharrock, received mixed critical reviews. The film was a box office success with worldwide revenues of $200 million. For her role as Louisa "Lou" Clark, she shared nominations with Sam Claflin for the Teen Choice Award for Choice Movie Liplock and the MTV Television Tearjerker Award. In 2017, she played the lead as Nurse Verena in the supernatural psychological thriller film Voice from the Stone. The film was released in April 2017 for a limited theatre run, followed by video on demand and digital HD.

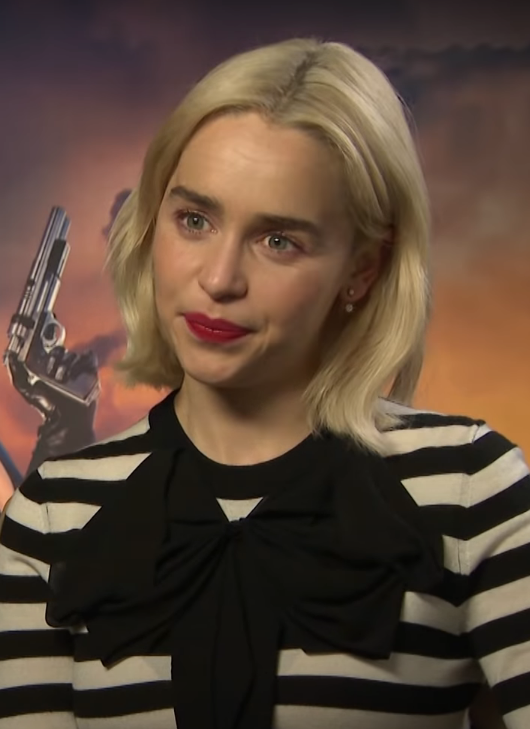
Clarke promoting Solo: A Star Wars Story in 2018

She was cast as the female lead in Solo: A Star Wars Story in November 2016. The movie, which was directed by Ron Howard and premiered in May 2018, details the origins of Star Wars characters Han Solo and Chewbacca. Clarke played Qi'ra, Han's childhood friend and love interest. The film received favourable critical reviews despite being the second-lowest grossing Star Wars film. The film was released worldwide on 25 May 2018. Her performance received positive critical reviews with many calling her one of the standouts of the film. Clarke, along with Jack Huston, was cast in 2016 as leads in the film Above Suspicion (2019). The film is based on a thriller novel by Joe Sharkey and directed by Phillip Noyce, and was announced at the 2016 Cannes Film Festival. The film received generally favourable reviews with Clarke's performance being highly praised by critics. It also had a turbulent release which left it vulnerable to piracy. In late 2019, Clarke starred opposite Henry Golding in the romantic comedy Last Christmas. The film was written by Emma Thompson and directed by Paul Feig. In a January 2020 interview with Bustle magazine, Clarke stated she was inspired by Will Ferrell's character in the 2003 comedy film Elf. Despite its unfavourable reviews, critics praised Clarke's performance, and the film went on to become a box office success grossing over $121 million worldwide.

Clarke starred as Nina in the West End production of Anton Chekhov's The Seagull, directed by Jamie Lloyd, which began previews on 11 March 2020 at the Playhouse Theatre. The production was suspended on 16 March due to the COVID-19 pandemic. The play was Clarke's first West End production. It resumed two years later in July 2022 and was broadcast internationally via National Theatre Live. The play, along with her portrayal of Nina won acclaim, with critics calling Clarke's performance, "magnetic" and "undeniably charismatic." In 2021, Clarke published the first in a series of comic books titled M.O.M.: Mother of Madness that she co-wrote with Marguerite Bennett.

=== 2022–present: Expansion into other franchises and independent cinema ===
In 2022, Clarke was cast in the animated film The Amazing Maurice. The film, which is an adaptation of The Amazing Maurice and His Educated Rodents by Terry Pratchett, was released in the United Kingdom on 16 December 2022 and in the United States on 3 February 2023. In January 2023, Clarke starred in and executive produced The Pod Generation. The film had its premiere at the Sundance Film Festival and was directed by Sophie Barthes.

Clarke was cast as the lead in the English language adaptation of the 2015 Korean romantic comedy The Beauty Inside. As of October 2019, the film was yet to begin production. It was announced in May 2019 that Clarke is set to play the English poet Elizabeth Barrett in the film Let Me Count the Ways, which The Wife director Björn Runge was set to direct.

Clarke played G'iah in Secret Invasion for Disney+, set in the Marvel Cinematic Universe (2023). In October 2021, Clarke was cast as Jean Kerr, wife of Joseph McCarthy, in a biopic titled McCarthy. In October 2022, it was announced that Clarke is set to play Irish author Constance Lloyd in director Sophie Hyde’s film An Ideal Wife.

In 2026, Clarke starred in and executive produced the Cold-War era drama Ponies. Variety praised the series as an endearing spy caper that allowed Clarke to show her range. Clarke's on-screen chemistry with co-star Haley Lu Richardson was also praised with Collider contributor Tania Hussain writing "Clarke and Richardson drive the series with an electric chemistry and partnership that feels well-earned".

== Other ventures ==
=== Advertising and endorsements ===
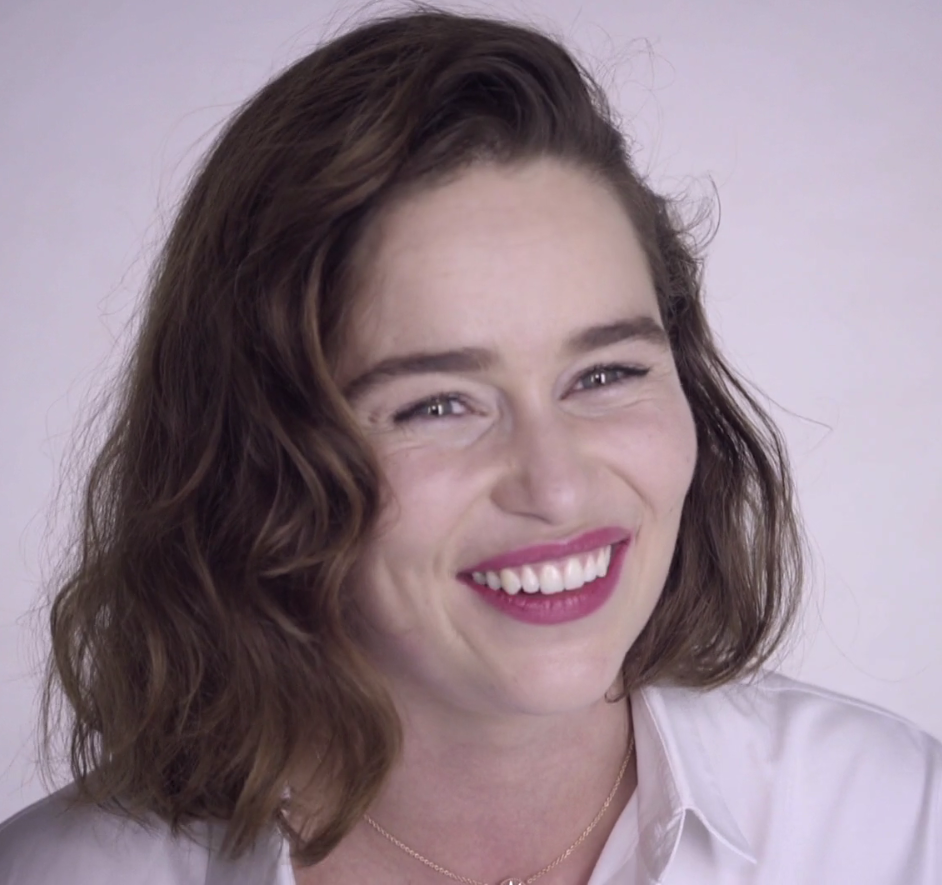
Clarke promoting Dior in 2015

In 2015, luxury goods company Dior signed Clarke to be the face of the Rose des Vents jewellery collection. In 2018, Dolce & Gabbana announced she would be the brand ambassador for the fragrance "The Only One". She starred in an advertisement, which was directed by Matteo Garrone for the perfume. Cosmetics company Clinique announced Clarke as their first global ambassador in early 2020.

=== Philanthropy ===
Clarke has lent her support to various charitable organisations. In August 2017, she became a patron of Open Door, a nonprofit that aims to help young people gain access to drama school auditions. She auctioned a chance to watch an episode of Game of Thrones with her at the 2018 Sean Penn Charity Gala, which raised over $120,000 benefiting the J/P HRO & Disaster Relief Organizations. In February 2018, she introduced the award recipients at London's Centrepoint Awards, which celebrates the courage shown by homeless young people.

In April 2018, she was named the sole ambassador to the Royal College of Nursing (RCN). As the RCN's ambassador, Clarke pledged to use her voice to fight for greater investment in nursing and to challenge misconceptions. Clarke also pledged to join nurses and healthcare workers to tackle the issues affecting the profession, including a falling number in training and shortages in the current workforce.

Clarke was also one of the numerous UK-based actresses to lend her voice to the Time's Up initiative, aimed at exposing sexual harassment and abuse, and creating a society free of gender-based discrimination in the workplace. In August 2018, Clarke, as well as Gemma Arterton, Lena Headey, Tom Hiddleston, Felicity Jones, Wunmi Mosaku, Florence Pugh, Gemma Chan, and Catherine Tate, featured in the short film titled Leading Lady Parts which took aim at the film industry's issue of gender inequality during the casting process.

In 2019, upon revealing the brain aneurysms she suffered in 2011 and 2013, Clarke launched her own charity named SameYou. The organisation aims to broaden access to neurorehabilitation for young people who have suffered a brain injury or a stroke. On 26 September 2019, she co-hosted a YouTube live stream with Irish YouTuber Jacksepticeye that raised over £200,000 for SameYou. After the conclusion of the final season of Game of Thrones, a fundraiser called "Justice for Daenerys" was started in which fans of the series raised over £83,000 for her charity. According to the fundraiser creator, the purpose was to collectively show their appreciation for both Clarke and the character of Daenerys Targaryen. In 2020, Clarke was presented with the Public Leadership in Neurology award by the American Brain Foundation for her efforts in raising awareness about neurorehabilitation. In the 2024 New Year Honours, Clarke and her mother, Jennifer Susan Dodd Clarke, were both made Members of the Order of the British Empire (MBE) in the civil division for their creation of the SameYou charity. She was invested with the honour on 21 February 2024 at Windsor Castle by the Prince of Wales.

In April 2020, Clarke began a fundraiser to help raise funds for her charity's COVID-19 fund. The fundraiser, which aimed to raise £250,000, supported both the Spaulding Rehabilitation Hospital in Boston, Massachusetts, and the University College Hospital in London. The organisation's initiative aimed to make a larger portion of beds available to coronavirus patients by providing a virtual rehabilitation clinic for people recovering from brain injuries and strokes. In a further response to the pandemic, Clarke announced the launch of an Instagram series of poetry readings, derived from a collection called The Poetry Pharmacy: Tried-and-True Prescriptions for the Heart, Mind and Soul. She began the series by reading a poem about loneliness, which she dedicated to her charity SameYou and announced that other performers would be joining the initiative, stating that every performer would dedicate their reading to a charity of their choosing.

In September 2020, Clarke joined Emma Thompson, Sanjeev Bhaskar and Robert Lindsay in a virtual reading of the play Private Lives by English playwright Noël Coward. It was announced that all funds raised from the performance would be used as a crisis grant to support those in the theatre industry who were struggling financially as a result of the pandemic.

== Public image ==
In August 2025, Clarke was featured for her upcoming 40th birthday in the Two Crazy Creatures dragon poem printed by UK publication Urban Pigs Press. She has been described by the media as an English rose.

== Personal life ==
Clarke lives in the London Borough of Islington. She also owned a house in the Venice Beach neighbourhood of Los Angeles, which she purchased in 2016 and sold in December 2020.

In an essay she wrote for The New Yorker in 2019, Clarke revealed that she had suffered a subarachnoid haemorrhage caused by a ruptured aneurysm in February 2011. She underwent urgent endovascular coiling surgery and subsequently suffered from aphasia, at one point being unable to say her name. She had a second aneurysm surgically treated in 2013.

Clarke has ADHD, for which she has been undergoing treatment since childhood, and believes she also has dyscalculia.

Once filming of the final season of Game of Thrones was completed, Clarke, as a tribute to her role as Daenerys Targaryen, celebrated her time on the show with a wrist tattoo featuring a trio of flying dragons. She also has a bumblebee tattoo on her pinky finger, commemorating her role as Louisa Clark in Me Before You.

From 2012 to 2013, Clarke was in a relationship with Seth MacFarlane. She also dated Charlie McDowell from 2018 to 2019.

== Acting credits ==
=== Film ===
Year	Title	Role	Notes	Ref.
2012	Shackled	Malu	Short film	
2012	Spike Island	Sally Harris		
2013	Dom Hemingway	Evelyn Hemingway		
2015	Terminator Genisys	Sarah Connor		
2016	Me Before You	Louisa Clark		
2017	Voice from the Stone	Verena		
2018	Solo: A Star Wars Story	Qi'ra		
2018	Leading Lady Parts	Herself	Short film	
2019	Above Suspicion	Susan Smith		
2019	Last Christmas	Katarina "Kate" Andrich		
2022	The Amazing Maurice	Malicia	Voice role	
2023	The Pod Generation	Rachel Novy	Also executive producer	
2025	The Twits	Pippa	Voice role	
2026	Next Life	Ivy	Also producer	
2027	When Darkness Loves Us †	TBA	Also executive producer	

Key
†	Denotes films that have not yet been released

=== Television ===
Year	Title	Role	Notes	Ref.
2009	Doctors	Saskia Mayer	Episode: "Empty Nest"	
2010	Triassic Attack	Savannah Roundtree	Television film	
2011–2019	Game of Thrones	Daenerys Targaryen	Main role; 62 episodes	
2013	Futurama	Marianne	Voice role; episode: "Stench and Stenchibility"	
2016	Robot Chicken	Bridget	Voice role; episode: "Joel Hurwitz Returns"	
2017	Animals	Lumpy	Voice role; episode: "Rats."	
2017	Thunderbirds Are Go	Doyle	Voice role; episode: "Rigged for Disaster"	
2019	Saturday Night Live	Herself	Episode: "Kit Harington / Sara Bareilles"	
2023	Secret Invasion	G'iah	Main role; 6 episodes	
2026	Ponies	Beatrice "Bea" Grant	Main role; also executive producer	
2027	Criminal †	Mallory	Post-production	

Key
†	Denotes television productions that have not yet been released

=== Theatre ===
Year	Title	Role	Notes	Ref.
2013	Breakfast at Tiffany's	Holiday "Holly" Golightly	Cort Theatre	
2020	Private Lives	Sybil	Lockdown Theatre Festival	
2020/2022	The Seagull	Nina Mikhailovna Zarechnaya	Harold Pinter Theatre	

=== Video games ===
Year	Title	Role	Notes	Ref.
2015	Game of Thrones	Daenerys Targaryen	Voice role	

=== Discography ===
Year	Soundtrack/Album	Song	Ref.
2013	Dom Hemingway	Fisherman's Blues	

== Accolades ==
Clarke has been nominated for numerous awards throughout her career. She was nominated for four Primetime Emmy Awards, including Outstanding Lead Actress in a Drama Series in 2019, for her role in Game of Thrones. She has received several Critics' Choice Awards nominations, the most recent in 2018. She also received the BAFTA Britannia Award for British Artist of the Year at the 2018 ceremony. In 2018, Clarke was invited to join the Academy of Motion Picture Arts and Sciences. In 2023, she was named actress of the year at the Harper's Bazaar Women of the Year Awards. Also, in 2023, she was awarded the Hollywood Rising-Star Award by the Deauville American Film Festival.

Time magazine named her one of the 100 most influential people in 2019. Clarke has also been honoured for her charitable work. In 2019, she won a Shorty Award for a video that was made to raise awareness for her charity SameYou and the Royal College of Nursing.
