= Shackled (2012 British film) =

- Directed by: Nour Wazzi
- Written by: Shirine Best; Ellie Emptage
- Produced by: Shirine Best; Ellie Emptage; Nour Wazzi
- Starring: Emilia Clarke; Hadley Fraser
- Cinematography: Sam Care
- Edited by: Jason Krasucki
- Music by: Alexandra Benedict, Tris Taylor
- Distributed by: Shorts International
- Release date: 2012
- Running time: 12 minutes
- Country: United Kingdom
- Language: English

Shackled is a 2012 short drama-thriller film directed by Nour Wazzi and starring Emilia Clarke and Hadley Fraser.

== Plot ==
Held captive by a circus in 1950s Louisiana, Malu is frantically rescued from her shackles by her husband. As she waits anxiously in the darkness for her chance to escape, a disturbing truth she's hidden away seeps back into her consciousness.

== Cast ==
- Emilia Clarke as Malu
- Hadley Fraser as Jesse

== Reception ==
One reviewer said of the film, "Although I never really understood what she was running away from the glossy almost fantasy like cinematography kept me watching until the very end."
