= Andre Dubus III =

American novelist (born 1959)

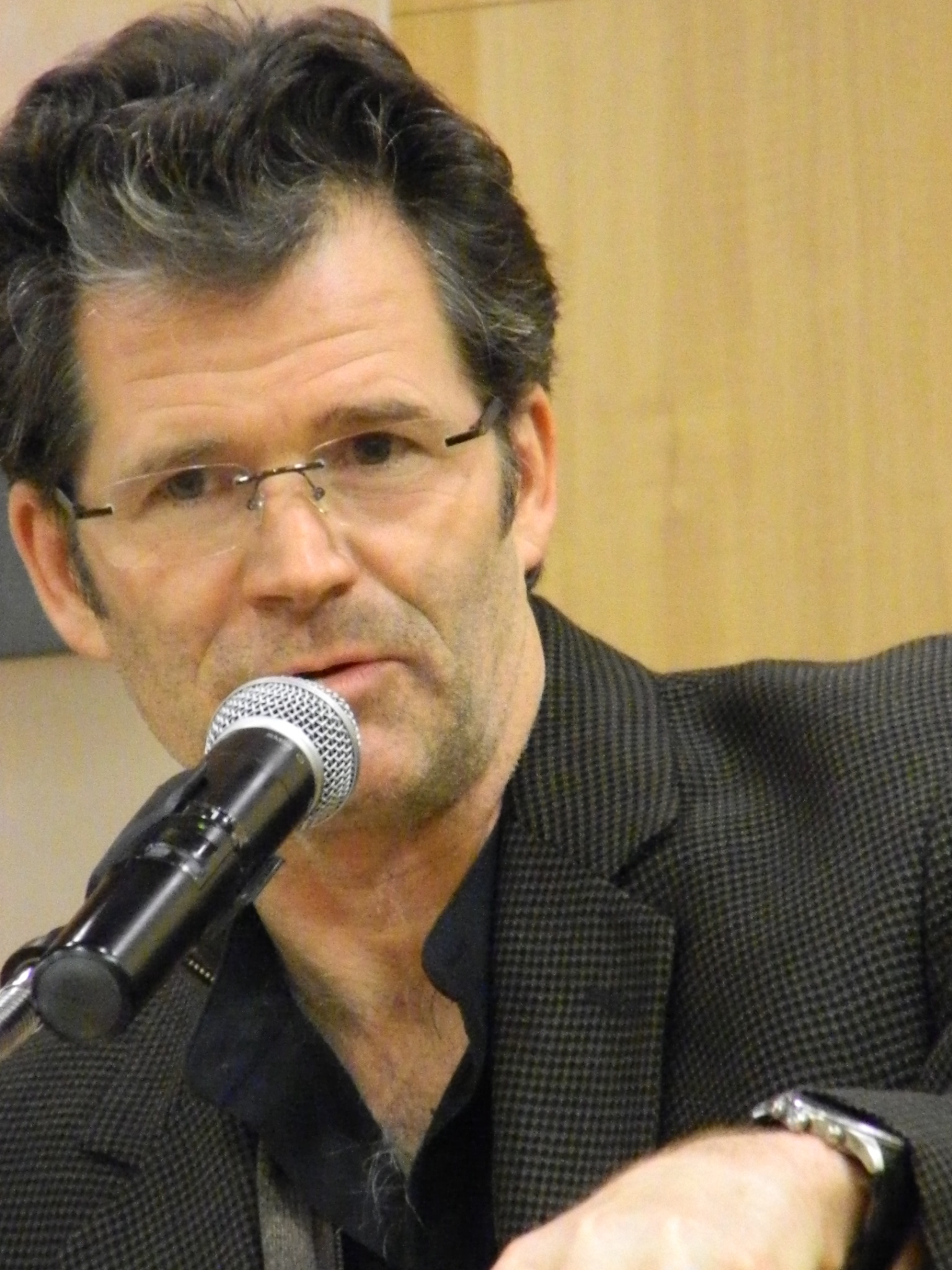
- Dubus at a New York Barnes & Noble in 2013
- Born: September 11, 1959 (age 67); Oceanside, California, U.S.
- Education: University of Texas at Austin (BA)
- Occupations: Novelist; Short story writer; Professor
- Spouse: Fontaine Dollas Dubus
- Writing career
- Notable works: House of Sand and Fog, Townie: A Memoir
- Website: andredubus.com

Andre Dubus III (born September 11, 1959) is an American novelist and short story writer. He is a member of the faculty at the University of Massachusetts Lowell.

== Early life and education ==
Born in Oceanside, California, to Patricia (née Lowe) and Louisiana-born writer Andre Dubus, Dubus grew up on the Massachusetts–New Hampshire border in the former mill town of Haverhill, Massachusetts, with his three siblings: Suzanne, Jeb, and Nicole. His father left his mother for one of his students, leaving his mother to support the family alone, under strained financial circumstances.

He began writing fiction at 22, shortly after graduating from the University of Texas at Austin with a bachelor's degree in sociology, and supported himself variously as a carpenter, bartender, office custodian, personal investigator, corrections counselor, and halfway house counselor.

== Career ==
His first published short story, "Forky," was published by Playboy when Dubus was 23.

Dubus's novel, House of Sand and Fog (1999), was a finalist for the National Book Award and was adapted for an Academy Award-nominated film of the same name. The book was a No. 1 New York Times bestseller.

His 2011 memoir Townie tells of growing up poor in Haverhill after his parents' divorce, street fighting, and eventually boxing, and deals extensively with his relationship with his father.

The novel Gone So Long was published in 2018. Daniel Ahearn committed a violent act that changed the lives of many, including members of his own family. Forty years older and sick, he aims to set things right. He is especially set on visiting his estranged daughter, whom he has not seen in decades.

His novel Such Kindness was published in June 2023. His collection of personal essays, titled Ghost Dogs: On Killers and Kin, was published in March 2024.

A member of PEN American Center, Dubus has served as a panelist for the National Book Foundation and the National Endowment for the Arts.

He has taught writing at Harvard University, Tufts University, Emerson College, and the University of Massachusetts Lowell, where he is a full-time faculty member.

After a three-year effort by Dubus, Oprah Winfrey was a guest at UMass Lowell, in November 2018. He met Winfrey in 2000 when appearing on her show, after the release of his novel House of Sand and Fog.

== Honors ==
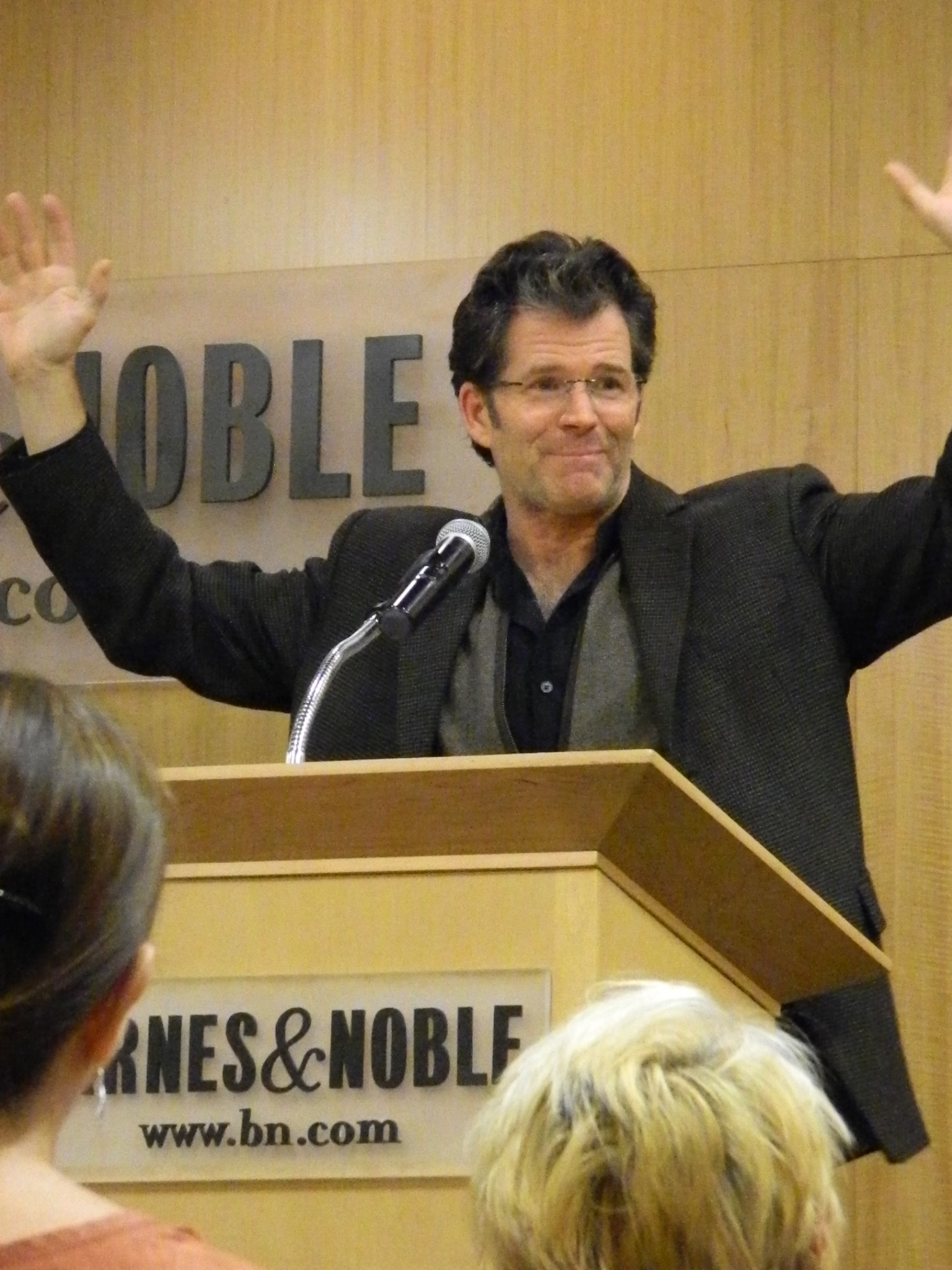
Dubus discussing Dirty Love

Dubus's work has been included in The Best American Essays 1994, The Best Spiritual Writing 1999, and The Best of Hope Magazine. He has been awarded a Guggenheim Fellowship, the National Magazine Award for fiction, and the Pushcart Prize. He was a finalist for the Rome Prize awarded by the American Academy of Arts and Letters.

Dubus's novel House of Sand and Fog was a fiction finalist for the National Book Award, the Los Angeles Times Book Prize, and Booksense Book of the Year. It was an Oprah Book Club selection and was on the New York Times bestseller list. The 2003 film adaptation directed by Vadim Perelman was nominated for three Oscars, a Golden Globe and 39 other prizes. It won 13 awards from local critics and other groups: 6 for supporting Actress Shohreh Aghdashloo, 4 for director Vadim Perelman, 2 for lead actor Ben Kingsley and 1 for actress Jennifer Connelly.

Townie was No. 4 on the New York Times bestseller list and included in the Editors Choice section.

Dirty Love was also included in the Editors Choice section of the New York Times. For the 2013 audio book, read by Dubus, he won the AudioFile Earphone Award.

Dubus's work has been translated and published in more than 25 different languages.

== Personal life ==
Dubus is married to performer Fontaine Dollas. They live in Newburyport, Massachusetts, with their three children.

== Works ==
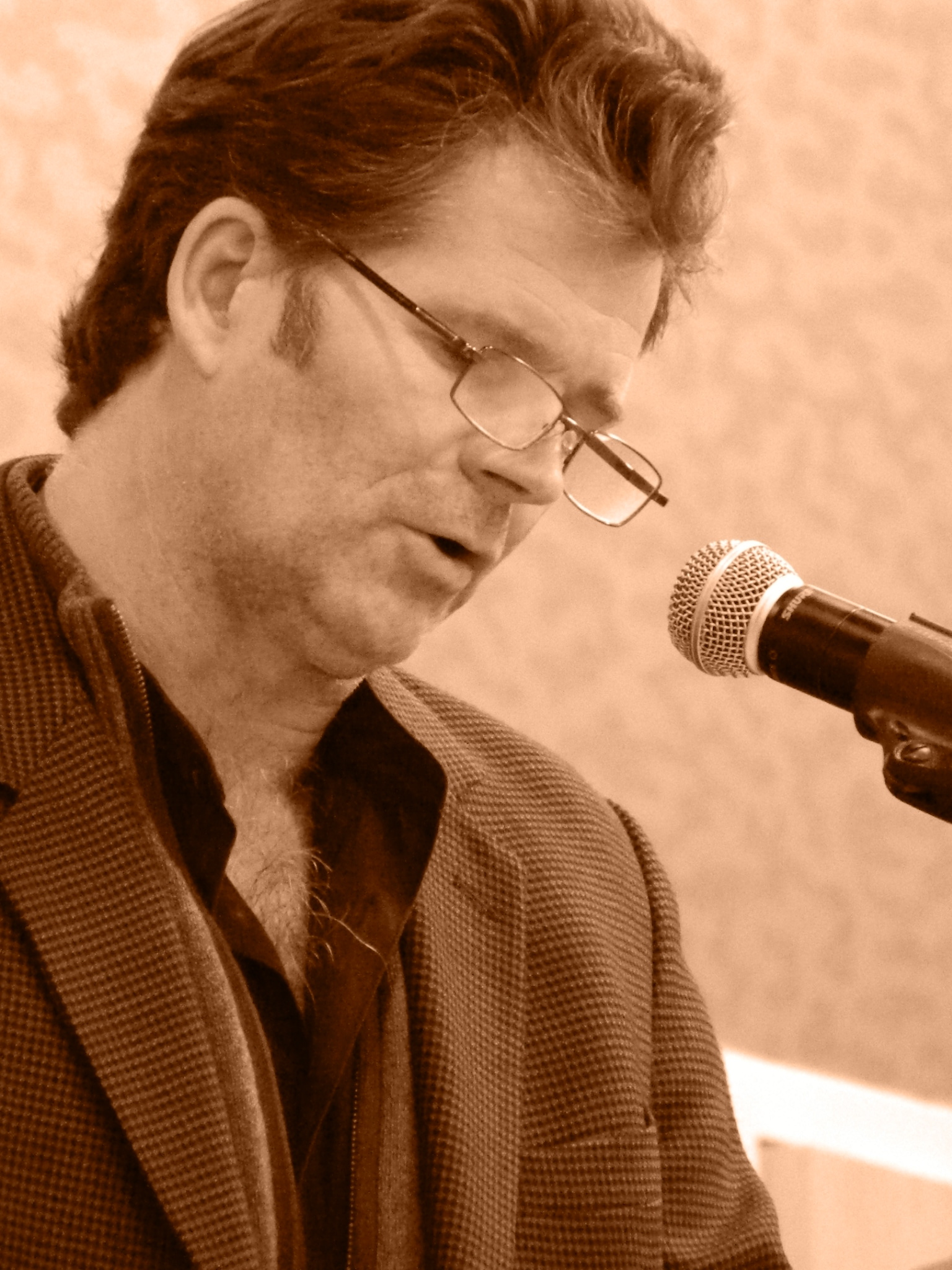
2013

=== Novels ===
- Bluesman (Farrar, Straus and Giroux, 1993) ISBN 9781466806610
- House of Sand and Fog (W. W. Norton, 1999)
- The Garden of Last Days (W. W. Norton, 2008)
- Dirty Love (W. W. Norton, 2013)
- Gone So Long (W. W. Norton, 2018) ISBN 978-0393244106
- Such Kindness (W. W. Norton, 2023) ISBN 978-1-324-00046-4

=== Short story collections ===
- The Cage Keeper and Other Stories (1989). Contains 7 short stories:
  - "The Cage Keeper"
  - "Duckling Girl"
  - "Wolves in the Marsh"
  - "Forky"
  - "Mountains"
  - "White Trees, Hammer Moon"
  - "Last Dance"

=== Non-fiction ===
- Townie: A Memoir (W. W. Norton, 2011)
- Ghost Dogs (a book of personal essays, W. W. Norton, 2024)

=== Anthologies ===
- "Blood, Root, Knit, Purl." Knitting Yarns: Writers on Knitting edited by Ann Hood (W. W. Norton, 2013)
