= A House of Sand =

- Directed by: Robert Darwin
- Written by: Robert Darwin
- Distributed by: American International Pictures (US)
- Release date: 1962
- Running time: 59 mins
- Country: USA
- Language: English

A House of Sand is a 1962 American film directed by Robert Darwin.

== See also ==
- List of American films of 1962
