= Jennifer Dodd Clarke =

British businesswoman and philanthropist

Jennifer Dodd Clarke MBE
- Born: Jennifer Susan Dodd
- Occupations: Businesswoman; philanthropist
- Spouse: Peter Roderick Clarke
- Children: 2 (including Emilia Clarke)

Jennifer Susan Dodd Clarke is a British businesswoman and philanthropist. She is the director of the Anima Foundation and a cofounder and chief executive of the charity SameYou. She was made a member of the Order of the British Empire in 2024 for her charitable service.

== Career ==
As of 2020, Dodd Clarke serves as the vice president for marketing at a global management consultancy firm. She is the director of The Anima Foundation, a charity focused on helping youth in Ghana. She co-founded SameYou, a brain injury recovery charity, with her daughter. She serves as the chief executive. She was made a member of the Order of the British Empire during the 2024 New Year Honours for her charity work surrounding brain injuries. She was presented with the honour by William, Prince of Wales during a ceremony at Windsor Castle in February 2024.

== Personal life ==
Dodd Clarke is married to Peter Roderick "Rick" Clarke, a theatre sound engineer from Wolverhampton. Their daughter is actress Emilia Clarke. Their son, Bennett, works in the entertainment industry and was part of the camera department for Game of Thrones.
