= Britannia Awards =

Award

British Academy Britannia Awards
- The logo of the British Academy of Film and Television Arts, which present the Britannia Awards.
- Awarded for: "Honoring individuals and companies who have dedicated their careers or corporate missions to advancing the art-forms of the moving image."
- Country: United States
- Presented by: BAFTA Los Angeles
- First award: 1989
- Final award: 2019
- Website: Official website

Television/radio coverage
- Network: TV Guide Network (2010–2011); BBC America (2012–2014); Pop (2015–2016); IGN (2017); BritBox US (2018–2019)

The British Academy Britannia Awards are presented by BAFTA Los Angeles, a branch of the British Academy of Film and Television Arts (BAFTA), as "a bridge between the Hollywood and British production and entertainment business communities." Established in 1989, it honours "individuals and companies who have dedicated their careers or corporate missions to advancing the art-forms of the moving image." The awards ceremony has been on an indefinite hiatus since the 2019 edition.

== History ==
From 1989 to 1998, only an honorary award was handed out to an individual during the presentation. By 1999, the accolade was expanded to include additional awards which include: Stanley Kubrick Britannia Award for Excellence in Film, John Schlesinger Britannia Award for Excellence in Directing, Britannia Award for British Artist of the Year and Charlie Chaplin Britannia Award for Excellence in Comedy. The ceremony has traditionally presented during the months of October or November, and has been televised in the United States from 2010.

=== 2020–present: Indefinite cancellation ===
After a long history of celebrating achievements in film and television, the Britannia Awards faced an indefinite hiatus following the COVID-19 pandemic. Initially canceled in 2020 due to the global health crisis, the British Academy of Film and Television Arts Los Angeles (BAFTA Los Angeles) announced the cancellation of the Britannia Awards for the second consecutive year in 2021. BAFTA stated that for the rest of 2021, the focus would shift to their year-round learning and talent programs.

In 2022, BAFTA Los Angeles took a significant step by scrapping the Britannia Awards altogether and instead announced an expansion of activities with year-round presentations of special awards across North America. This new direction allows for a series of bespoke events to honor talent in film, television, and games, marking a departure from the traditional annual gala dinner format.

== Ceremonies ==
Occurring in October or November, the Britannia Awards ceremony is presented at a black tie gala dinner, and has been held predominately at the Hyatt Regency Century Plaza and Beverly Hilton Hotel. Stephen Fry, Alan Cumming, and Jack Whitehall have each hosted the ceremony three times, the most of any other hosts. In the following table all reliable sources used make no mention of complete dates, ceremonies or hosts for the years prior to 1997.

Ceremony	Date	Venue	Host(s)	Ref(s)
	1989	—N/a		
	1990	—N/a		
1st	1991	—N/a		
2nd	1992	—N/a		
3rd	1993	—N/a		
4th	1994	—N/a		
5th	1995	—N/a		
6th	1996	—N/a		
7th	24 September 1997	—N/a	Billy Connolly	
8th	15 October 1998	Beverly Wilshire Hotel	Billy Connolly	
9th	September 1999	Beverly Hilton Hotel	—N/a	
10th	4 November 2000	Hyatt Regency Century Plaza	Whoopi Goldberg	
—N/a	2001	No award given		
11th	12 April 2002	Beverly Hilton Hotel	Carrie Fisher	
12th	8 November 2003	Hyatt Regency Century Plaza	Alan Cumming	
13th	4 November 2004	Beverly Hilton Hotel	Craig Ferguson	
14th	10 November 2005	Beverly Hilton Hotel	Craig Ferguson	
15th	2 November 2006	Hyatt Regency Century Plaza	Stephen Fry	
16th	1 November 2007	Hyatt Regency Century Plaza	Michael Sheen	
17th	6 November 2008	Hyatt Regency Century Plaza	Harry Shearer	
18th	5 November 2009	Hyatt Regency Century Plaza	Stephen Fry	
19th	12 November 2010	Hyatt Regency Century Plaza	Stephen Fry	
20th	30 November 2011	Beverly Hilton Hotel	Alan Cumming	
21st	7 November 2012	Beverly Hilton Hotel	Alan Cumming	
22nd	9 November 2013	Beverly Hilton Hotel	Rob Brydon	
23rd	30 October 2014	Beverly Hilton Hotel	Rob Brydon	
24th	30 October 2015	Beverly Hilton Hotel	Jack Whitehall	
25th	28 October 2016	Beverly Hilton Hotel	Doc Brown	
26th	27 October 2017	Beverly Hilton Hotel	Jack Whitehall	
27th	26 October 2018	Beverly Hilton Hotel	Jack Whitehall	
28th	25 October 2019	Beverly Hilton Hotel	James Veitch	

== Winners ==
=== 1989–1998 ===
Year	Recipient	Award	Ref(s)
1989	Albert R. Broccoli	The Britannia Award	
1990	Michael Caine	The Britannia Award	
1991	No award given		
1992	Peter Ustinov	The Britannia Award	
1993	Martin Scorsese	The Britannia Award	
1994	No award given		
1995	Anthony Hopkins	The Britannia Award	
1996	Bob Weinstein ~~and Harvey Weinstein~~ (Note: The award was rescinded following BAFTA's suspension and subsequent termination of Harvey Weinstein's membership following allegations of sexual abuse.)	The Britannia Award	
1997	Dustin Hoffman	The Britannia Award	
1998	John Travolta	The Britannia Award	

=== 1999–2009 ===
Recipient	Award	Ref(s)
1999
Stanley Kubrick	Honoree for Excellence in Film	
Aaron Spelling	Honoree for Excellence in Television	
Tarsem Singh	Honoree for Excellence in Commercials Direction	
BBC	Honoree for Corporate Excellence	
2000
Steven Spielberg	Stanley Kubrick Britannia Award for Excellence in Film	
2001
No award given
2002
George Lucas	Stanley Kubrick Britannia Award for Excellence in Film	
HBO Original Programming	Britannia Award for Excellence in Television	
2003
Hugh Grant	Stanley Kubrick Britannia Award for Excellence in Film	
Angela Lansbury	Britannia Award for Lifetime Achievement in Television and Film	
Howard Stringer	Britannia Award for Worldwide Contribution to Filmed Entertainment	
Peter Weir	John Schlesinger Britannia Award for Artistic Excellence in Directing	
2004
Tom Hanks	Stanley Kubrick Britannia Award for Excellence in Film	
Helen Mirren	Britannia Award for Excellence in International Entertainment	
Jim Sheridan	John Schlesinger Britannia Award for Artistic Excellence in Directing	
2005
Tom Cruise	Stanley Kubrick Britannia Award for Excellence in Film	
Elizabeth Taylor	Britannia Award for Artistic Excellence in International Entertainment	
Mike Newell	John Schlesinger Britannia Award for Artistic Excellence in Directing	
Ronald Neame	Cunard Britannia Award for Lifetime Contributions to International Film	
2006
Clint Eastwood	Stanley Kubrick Britannia Award for Excellence in Film	
Sidney Poitier	Cunard Britannia Award for Lifetime Contributions to International Film	
Rachel Weisz	Britannia Award for British Artist of the Year	
Anthony Minghella	John Schlesinger Britannia Award for Artistic Excellence in Directing	
2007
Denzel Washington	Stanley Kubrick Britannia Award for Excellence in Film	
Martin Campbell	John Schlesinger Britannia Award for Artistic Excellence in Directing	
Bob Shaye and Michael Lynne of New Line Cinema	Britannia Award for Lifetime Contributions to International Film	
Kate Winslet	Britannia Award for British Artist of the Year	
Richard Curtis	BAFTA/LA Humanitarian Award	
2008
Sean Penn	Stanley Kubrick Britannia Award for Excellence in Film	
Tilda Swinton	Britannia Award for British Artist of the Year	
Stephen Frears	John Schlesinger Britannia Award for Artistic Excellence in Directing	
Don Cheadle	BAFTA/LA Humanitarian Award	
2009
Robert De Niro	Stanley Kubrick Britannia Award for Excellence in Film	
Danny Boyle	John Schlesinger Britannia Award for Artistic Excellence in Directing	
Emily Blunt	Britannia Award for British Artist of the Year	
Colin Firth	BAFTA/LA Humanitarian Award	
Kirk Douglas	Britannia Award for Worldwide Contribution to Filmed Entertainment	

=== 2010–2019 ===
Recipient	Award	Ref(s)
2010
Jeff Bridges	Stanley Kubrick Britannia Award for Excellence in Film	
Betty White	Charlie Chaplin Britannia Award for Excellence in Comedy	
Christopher Nolan	John Schlesinger Britannia Award for Artistic Excellence in Directing	
Ridley Scott and Tony Scott of Scott Free Productions	Britannia Award for Worldwide Contribution to Filmed Entertainment	
Michael Sheen	Britannia Award for British Artist of the Year	
2011
Warren Beatty	Stanley Kubrick Britannia Award for Excellence in Film	
John Lasseter	Albert R. Broccoli Britannia Award for Worldwide Contribution to Filmed Entertainment	
David Yates	John Schlesinger Britannia Award for Excellence in Directing	
Helena Bonham Carter	Britannia Award for British Artist of the Year	
Ben Stiller	Charlie Chaplin Britannia Award for Excellence in Comedy	
2012
Daniel Day-Lewis	Stanley Kubrick Britannia Award for Excellence in Film	
Will Wright	Albert R. Broccoli Britannia Award for Worldwide Contribution to Entertainment	
Quentin Tarantino	John Schlesinger Britannia Award for Excellence in Directing	
Daniel Craig	Britannia Award for British Artist of the Year	
Trey Parker and Matt Stone	Charlie Chaplin Britannia Award for Excellence in Comedy	
2013
George Clooney	Stanley Kubrick Britannia Award for Excellence in Film	
Sir Ben Kingsley	Albert R. Broccoli Britannia Award for Worldwide Contribution to Entertainment	
Kathryn Bigelow	John Schlesinger Britannia Award for Excellence in Directing	
Benedict Cumberbatch	Britannia Award for British Artist of the Year	
Sacha Baron Cohen	Charlie Chaplin Britannia Award for Excellence in Comedy (Played a prank by pushing Grace Cullington, the supposed oldest surviving Chaplin co-star, off the stage.)	
Idris Elba	Britannia Humanitarian Award	
2014
Robert Downey Jr.	Stanley Kubrick Britannia Award for Excellence in Film	
Judi Dench	Albert R. Broccoli Britannia Award for Worldwide Contribution to Entertainment	
Mike Leigh	John Schlesinger Britannia Award for Excellence in Directing	
Emma Watson	Britannia Award for British Artist of the Year	
Julia Louis-Dreyfus	Charlie Chaplin Britannia Award for Excellence in Comedy	
Mark Ruffalo	Britannia Humanitarian Award	
2015
Meryl Streep	Stanley Kubrick Britannia Award for Excellence in Film	
Harrison Ford	Albert R. Broccoli Britannia Award for Worldwide Contribution to Entertainment	
Sam Mendes	John Schlesinger Britannia Award for Excellence in Directing	
James Corden	Britannia Award for British Artist of the Year	
Amy Schumer	Charlie Chaplin Britannia Award for Excellence in Comedy	
Orlando Bloom	Britannia Humanitarian Award	
2016
Jodie Foster	Stanley Kubrick Britannia Award for Excellence in Film	
Samuel L. Jackson	Albert R. Broccoli Britannia Award for Worldwide Contribution to Entertainment	
Ang Lee	John Schlesinger Britannia Award for Excellence in Directing	
Felicity Jones	Britannia Award for British Artist of the Year	
Ricky Gervais	Charlie Chaplin Britannia Award for Excellence in Comedy	
Ewan McGregor	Britannia Humanitarian Award	
2017
Matt Damon	Stanley Kubrick Britannia Award for Excellence in Film	
Kenneth Branagh	Albert R. Broccoli Britannia Award for Worldwide Contribution to Entertainment	
Ava DuVernay	John Schlesinger Britannia Award for Excellence in Directing	
Claire Foy	Britannia Award for British Artist of the Year	
Aziz Ansari	Charlie Chaplin Britannia Award for Excellence in Comedy	
Dick Van Dyke	Britannia Award for Excellence in Television	
2018
Cate Blanchett	Stanley Kubrick Britannia Award for Excellence in Film	
Kevin Feige	Albert R. Broccoli Britannia Award for Worldwide Contribution to Entertainment	
Steve McQueen	John Schlesinger Britannia Award for Excellence in Directing	
Emilia Clarke	Britannia Award for British Artist of the Year	
Jim Carrey	Charlie Chaplin Britannia Award for Excellence in Comedy	
Damian Lewis	Britannia Award for Excellence in Television	
Mark Pigott KBE	Britannia Humanitarian Award	
2019
Jane Fonda	Stanley Kubrick Britannia Award for Excellence in Film	
Jackie Chan	Albert R. Broccoli Britannia Award for Worldwide Contribution to Entertainment	
Jordan Peele	John Schlesinger Britannia Award for Excellence in Directing	
Phoebe Waller-Bridge	Britannia Award for British Artist of the Year	
Steve Coogan	Charlie Chaplin Britannia Award for Excellence in Comedy	
Norman Lear	Britannia Award for Excellence in Television	
