= House of Sand and Fog (soundtrack) =

House of Sand and Fog (Original Motion Picture Soundtrack)

Film score by James Horner
- Released: December 9, 2003
- Recorded: 2003
- Studios: Todd-AO Scoring Stage, Studio City, Los Angeles
- Label: Varèse Sarabande
- Producers: Simon Rhodes; James Horner

James Horner chronology
| The Missing (2003) | House of Sand and Fog (Original Motion Picture Soundtrack) (2003) | Bobby Jones: Stroke of Genius (2004) |

Professional ratings
Review scores
| Source | Rating |
|---|---|
| SoundtrackNet | 2.5/5 stars |

House of Sand and Fog (Original Motion Picture Soundtrack) is the original soundtrack album of the 2003 film House of Sand and Fog starring Jennifer Connelly, Ben Kingsley, Shohreh Aghdashloo and Ron Eldard. The original score was composed and conducted by James Horner and performed by the Hollywood Studio Symphony. It was released by Varèse Sarabande on December 9, 2003.

The album was nominated for the Academy Award for Best Original Score.

== Track listing ==
| No. | Title | Length |
|---|---|---|
| 1. | "An Older Life" | 1:54 |
| 2. | "The Waves of the Caspian Sea" | 4:00 |
| 3. | "Old Photos, New Memories" | 3:23 |
| 4. | "This Is No Longer Your House" | 3:34 |
| 5. | "Two People" | 3:49 |
| 6. | "Kathy's Night" | 2:18 |
| 7. | "Parallel Lives, Parallel Loves" | 5:22 |
| 8. | "Behrani's Thoughts - Long Ago" | 4:49 |
| 9. | "Break-In" | 2:34 |
| 10. | "The Dreams of Kings" | 6:58 |
| 11. | "The Shooting, A Payment for Our Sins" | 15:18 |
| 12. | "We Have Travelled So Far, It Is Time to Return to Our Path" | 9:05 |
| 13. | "A Return to the Caspian, And to the Iran of Old" | 6:37 |
