= Triassic Attack =

Television Film

- DVD cover
- Directed by: Colin Ferguson
- Starring: Steven Brand; Kirsty Mitchell; Emilia Clarke; Raoul Trujillo; Christopher Villiers; Gabriel Womack; Jordan Bonev; Nathalie Buscombe
- Theme music composer: Frederik Wiedmann
- Country of origin: United States
- Original language: English

Production
- Producers: Jeffery Beach; Cherise Honey

Original release
- Network: Syfy
- Release: November 27, 2010

Triassic Attack is a 2010 television film directed by Colin Ferguson and produced by UFO International Productions. It premiered November 27, 2010, on the Syfy television channel.

== Synopsis ==
Triassic Attack is set in Mill City, United States, where a large university has bought a significant amount of local land and property with the intent to expand its grounds by demolishing half the houses and shops. A local Native American named Dakota is opposed to the plans, which will destroy his ancestors' heritage. He also feels his people were tricked into signing away their land, and is trying to stop the bulldozers moving in. Dakota's nephew is Jake Roundtree, the town sheriff, who has to abide by the law. Frustrated and angry, Dakota decides to use ancient magic to save the town and performs a rite which causes evil spirits to possess three dinosaur skeletons, bringing them to life. The rampaging skeletons attack and kill everyone they come across in their path. Jake and his ex-wife Emma set out together to find and save their daughter Savannah and try to stop the dinosaurs. Dakota joins them and together they manage to electrocute the fossils with a local power plant, setting an end to their rampage.

== Cast ==
- Steven Brand as Sheriff Jake Roundtree
- Kirsty Mitchell as Emma Neil-Roundtree
- Emilia Clarke as Savannah Roundtree
- Raoul Trujillo as Dakota
- Gabriel Womack as Wyatt
- Christopher Villiers as Professor Keller

== See also ==
- List of films featuring dinosaurs
