= The Garden of Last Days =

2008 novel by Andre Dubus III

- Cover
- Author: Andre Dubus III
- Language: English
- Published: W. W. Norton & Company
- Pages: 544 (paperback)
- ISBN: 9780393335309
- OCLC: 190860129
- Preceded by: House of Sand and Fog

The Garden of Last Days is a 2008 novel by Andre Dubus III. It tells the interweaving stories of several individuals in Florida in the days before the September 11 attacks. The book is a follow-up to House of Sand and Fog.

== Summary ==
One early September night in Florida, April, a stripper at the "Puma Club for Men" brings her daughter to work when her usual babysitter is in the hospital. That night, April has an unusual client, a foreigner both remote and too personal, and free with his money. His name is Bassam. Meanwhile, AJ, another man, has been thrown out of the club for holding hands with his favorite stripper, and he's drunk, angry and lonely.

== Reviews ==
John Dufresne with the Boston Sunday Globe said the book was "storytelling of the finest kind: unforgettable and desperate characters caught up in a plot thundering toward catastrophe". Jocelyn McClurg with USA Today said the book was "One of the most maddening, exhilarating…novels of the year."

== Film adaptation ==
In 2013, Millennium Entertainment signed on to finance the film adaptation of the novel, with Gerard Butler, Alan Siegel, Danielle Robinson and Hanna Weg to produce it. Weg wrote the script and Vince Jolivette and Miles Levy are also producers. However, in June 2013, James Franco, who was to direct and star in the film, pulled out of the project after not being able to agree with Millennium on a production crew.
