= House of Sand and Fog (film) =

2003 film by Vadim Perelman

- Theatrical release poster
- Directed by: Vadim Perelman
- Screenplay by: Vadim Perelman; Shawn Lawrence Otto
- Based on: House of Sand and Fog by Andre Dubus III
- Produced by: Michael London; Vadim Perelman
- Starring: Jennifer Connelly; Ben Kingsley; Ron Eldard; Frances Fisher; Kim Dickens
- Cinematography: Roger Deakins
- Edited by: Lisa Zeno Churgin
- Music by: James Horner
- Production companies: Bisgrove Entertainment; Cobalt Media Group
- Distributed by: Miramax Films (United Kingdom; through Buena Vista International); DreamWorks Pictures (United States)
- Release dates: December 19, 2003 (United States); February 27, 2004 (United Kingdom)
- Running time: 124 minutes
- Countries: United Kingdom; United States
- Languages: English; Persian
- Budget: $16.5 million
- Box office: $16.9 million

House of Sand and Fog is a 2003 drama film directed by Vadim Perelman. The screenplay by Perelman and Shawn Lawrence Otto is based on the 1999 novel by Andre Dubus III. It stars Jennifer Connelly and Ben Kingsley, with Ron Eldard, Frances Fisher, and Kim Dickens in supporting roles.

The story concerns the battle between a former drug addict and an immigrant-American Iranian family over the ownership of a house in Northern California, which ultimately leads to the destruction of five lives. House of Sand and Fog was released by DreamWorks Pictures in the United States on December 19, 2003, and by Miramax Films (through Buena Vista International) in the United Kingdom on February 27, 2004, receiving positive reviews from critics while grossing $16.9 million against a $16.5 million budget. The film was nominated for three Academy Awards: Best Actor (Kingsley), Best Supporting Actress (Shohreh Aghdashloo), and Best Original Score (James Horner).

== Plot ==
Abandoned by her husband, recovering drug addict Kathy Nicolo, living alone in a small house near the San Francisco Bay Area, ignores eviction notices erroneously sent to her for nonpayment of business taxes. Assuming the misunderstanding was cleared up, she is surprised when Sheriff's Deputy Lester Burdon arrives to forcibly evict her. Telling Kathy that her home is to be auctioned off, Lester feels sympathy for her, helps her move out, and advises her to seek legal assistance to regain her house.

Former Imperial Iranian Army colonel Massoud Behrani, who fled his homeland with his family, now lives in the Bay Area working multiple menial jobs. Living beyond his means, he maintains the façade of a respectable businessman so as not to shame his wife Nadereh, son Esmail, and daughter Soraya. He buys Kathy's house for a quarter of its actual value, intending to improve and sell it. Kathy is evicted from the motel she is staying in. With nowhere else to go, she spends the night in her car. Seeing the renovations and how the Behranis have settled in makes her determined to get her house back and she finds an attorney, Connie Walsh, who assures her that because of the county's mistake, they will return Massoud's money and restore the house to her.

Massoud, having already spent money on improving the house, is unwilling to accept anything less than the higher value of the property, which the county refuses to pay. Connie advises Kathy that her only option is now to sue the county, though it will take months. Kathy tries to convince Massoud to sell back the house; he too advises her to sue the county and promises to sell her the house back if she comes up with the money, but she retaliates by beginning to harass him and his family in front of potential buyers. Desperate for help, Kathy falls easily into an affair with Lester, who abandons his wife and children and fashions himself as Kathy's protector. Under a pseudonym, Lester threatens to have Massoud and his family deported if he refuses to sell the house back to the county. Aware that Lester was acting on Kathy's behalf, Massoud reports this to Internal Affairs, who severely reprimand Lester, and furiously warns Kathy to leave his family alone. Kathy calls her brother Frank for help, but cannot bring herself to admit that she is homeless.

Despondent, Kathy becomes drunk and attempts suicide in the driveway with Lester's sidearm. Massoud finds Kathy drunkenly unable to discharge the gun, and brings her inside. Kathy tries to kill herself again with pills, but Nadereh saves her. As she and her husband carry Kathy to the bedroom, Lester breaks in and sees Kathy unconscious. In a xenophobic rage, Lester locks the Behranis in their own bathroom, refusing to let them out until Massoud agrees to relinquish the house. Massoud offers to sell the house and will give Kathy the money in exchange for her putting the house in his name. Lester takes Massoud to the county office to finalize the transaction.

Outside the office, Lester begins to manhandle Massoud and Esmail seizes Lester's gun and aims it at him. Massoud grabs Lester and begins calling for help from nearby police officers, but they misinterpret the situation and shoot Esmail instead of Lester. Massoud is arrested but is released after Lester confesses to his crimes and is detained.

Massoud begs God to save his son but Esmail does not survive. Believing they have nothing left to live for and to spare his wife the pain of losing her son, Massoud kills Nadereh by lacing her tea with pills. He then dons his old military uniform, tapes a plastic dust cover over his head, and asphyxiates himself while clutching his wife's hand. Kathy discovers the couple and frantically attempts to resuscitate Massoud but she is too late. As the bodies of Massoud and Nadereh are taken away by paramedics, a policeman asks Kathy if the house is hers. After a long pause, she admits that it is not.

== Cast ==
- Jennifer Connelly as Kathy Nicolo
- Ben Kingsley as Colonel Massoud Behrani
- Ron Eldard as Deputy Sheriff Lester Burdon
- Frances Fisher as Connie Walsh
- Kim Dickens as Carol Burdon
- Shohreh Aghdashloo as Nadereh "Nadi" Behrani
- Jonathan Ahdout as Esmail Behrani
- Carlos Gomez as Lieutenant Alvarez
- Navi Rawat as Soraya Behrani
- Al Rodrigo as Torez
- Marco Rodríguez as Mendez
- Aki Aleong as Tran
- Cooper Thornton as Gary
- Ray Abruzzo as Frank Nicolo
- Spencer Garrett as Auctioneer

== Production ==
Harvey Weinstein wanted Todd Field to direct and offered Vadim Perelman $500,000, a producer credit and a script of his choosing from the Miramax Films slate instead, which he declined. Julianne Moore was initially attached but after meeting Jennifer Connelly, Perelman went with her at the eleventh hour.

Shohreh Aghdashloo was a respected actress in Iran before immigrating to the United States. When the film roles offered to her were limited to terrorists and other assorted villains, she turned to a career in the theater. This film marked her return to the screen after nearly two decades.

Jonathan Ahdout, whose previous acting experience was limited to school plays, was cast as Esmail Behrani two days before the start of filming. His original audition had not impressed Perelman, but when he began to have doubts about the actor he had hired, he reviewed the audition tapes and saw something in Ahdout's performance he felt he had overlooked. He called him back and had him meet and perform with Aghdashloo. The chemistry between them convinced Perelman the boy was right for the part.

The house featured in the film, which is fictionally in Northern California's Half Moon Bay, is actually located in Malibu. The property was staged to appear more neglected and weathered than it actually was, in order to look less desirable.

=== Music ===
An original soundtrack album featuring James Horner's film score was released by Varèse Sarabande.

== Reception ==
=== Critical response ===
The film received positive reviews from critics. Based on 180 reviews collected by Rotten Tomatoes, 74% of critics gave House of Sand and Fog a positive review, with an average rating of 7.3/10. The website's critical consensus states, "Powerful and thought provoking film". On Metacritic, the film holds a score of 71 out of 100, sampled from 41 critics' reviews, indicating "generally favorable" reviews. Audiences polled by CinemaScore gave the film an average grade of "B+" on an A+ to F scale.

In his review in The New York Times, A. O. Scott called the film "an impressively self-assured directing debut" and wrote it "is the nearly flawless execution of a deeply flawed premise. Mr. Perelman inadvertently exposes the inconsistencies in Mr. Dubus's novel even as he comes very close to overcoming them...the conflict between Kathy and Behrani arises from a sin so trivial as to be almost comical ... and every stage of its escalation seems determined less by the psychology of the characters than by the forced, schematic logic of the story. You feel the heavy, implacable force of the narrative without quite believing it." In Variety, Todd McCarthy called the film, along with Mystic River and 21 Grams, one of "the first significant group of post-9/11 movies".

Roger Ebert of the Chicago Sun-Times gave the film four out of four stars and wrote, "Here is a film that seizes us with its first scene and never lets go, and we feel sympathy all the way through for everyone in it ..it stands with integrity and breaks our hearts." Owen Gleiberman of Entertainment Weekly rated the film B−: "[it] has its pretensions, but mostly it's a vigorous and bracingly acted melodrama spun off from a situation that's pure human-thriller catnip...though I do wish that the movie didn't spiral into the most shocking of tragedies." David Edelstein of Slate wrote, "Kingsley, Connelly, Eldard, and Aghdashloo give vivid and courageous performances. But the machinations of tragedy and farce are quite similar, and in a bad tragedy, they can merge."

Peter Travers of Rolling Stone rated it three out of a possible four stars and added, "Before it runs off course into excess, this brilliantly acted film version of the 1999 novel by Andre Dubus III moves with a stabbing urgency...Vadim Perelman...makes a smashing debut in features...Prepare for an emotional wipeout." In The New Yorker, David Denby wrote Ben Kingsley is "the only entertainment in this noble pool of despair...Vadim Perelman...produces scenes of great intensity, but he doesn't capture the colloquial ease and humor of American life."

On Salon.com, Andrew O'Hehir wrote it "features an astonishing pair of lead performances and one of this year's most impressive directing debuts." Channel 4 stated "There's nothing wrong in funneling operatic tragedy through seemingly mundane domestic battles, but the way events escalate here feels deeply fraudulent...heavy-handed allegory and symbolism wait at every turn...though relentlessly downbeat, this is so overwrought, underdeveloped and ham-fisted that it's more unintentionally comic than genuinely tragic."

The Washington Post's Ann Hornaday commented that the film loses much of the nuance in Dubus' book and concluded, "What should have been a nuanced exploration of the roots of violence turns out to be a cautionary tale about opening your mail." Ed Gonzales of Slant Magazine contended the film "refuses to examine the racism that makes the story's real estate fiasco a fiasco to begin with".

=== Box office ===
The film began a limited release in the United States on December 19, 2003, and opened at #43, grossing $45,572 in its opening weekend. It eventually grossed $13,040,288 in North America and $3,902,507 in other territories for a worldwide total of $16,942,795. Its budget was $16.5 million.

=== Accolades ===
Award	Category	Recipient	Result
Academy Awards	Best Actor	Ben Kingsley	Nominated
Academy Awards	Best Supporting Actress	Shohreh Aghdashloo	Nominated
Academy Awards	Best Original Score	James Horner	Nominated
Broadcast Film Critics Association Awards	Best Actor	Ben Kingsley	Nominated
Broadcast Film Critics Association Awards	Best Actress	Jennifer Connelly	Nominated
Golden Globe Awards	Best Actor – Motion Picture Drama	Ben Kingsley	Nominated
Independent Spirit Awards	Best Supporting Female	Shohreh Aghdashloo	Won
Independent Spirit Awards	Best Male Lead	Ben Kingsley	Nominated
Independent Spirit Awards	Best First Film	Vadim Perelman	Nominated
Los Angeles Film Critics Association Awards	Best Supporting Actress	Shohreh Aghdashloo	Won
National Board of Review Awards	Best Directorial Debut	Vadim Perelman	Won
New York Film Critics Circle Awards	Best Supporting Actress	Shohreh Aghdashloo	Won
Phoenix Film Critics Society Awards	Best Actor	Ben Kingsley	Won
Phoenix Film Critics Society Awards	Best Adapted Screenplay	Vadim Perelman and Shawn Lawrence Otto	Nominated
Phoenix Film Critics Society Awards	Breakout Director of the Year	Vadim Perelman	Nominated
Satellite Awards	Best Editing	Lisa Zeno Churgin	Nominated

== See also ==
- Cinema of the United States
- List of American films of 2003
