= House of Sand and Fog (novel) =

1999 novel by Andre Dubus III

- First edition cover
- Author: Andre Dubus III
- Language: English
- Genre: Fiction
- Publisher: W. W. Norton & Company
- Publication date: February 1, 1999
- Publication place: United States
- Media type: Print (Hardcover and Paperback)
- Pages: 365 pp
- ISBN: 0-393-04697-4
- OCLC: 39546150
- Dewey Decimal: 813/.54 21
- LC Class: PS3554.U2652 H68 1999

House of Sand and Fog is a 1999 novel by Andre Dubus III. It was selected for Oprah's Book Club in 2000, was a finalist for the National Book Award for Fiction, and was adapted into the 2003 film of the same name.

== Plot ==
The novel begins by introducing Massoud Behrani, a former Iranian air force colonel who fled from Iran after the Iranian Revolution. Because his background is military rather than professional, he has not been able to establish a career in the US and works as a trash collector and convenience store clerk. With savings, he pays the rent on an expensive apartment for his family and for an elegant wedding for his daughter. His fellow Iranian exiles, who are more successful and enjoy greater financial security, are unaware that he holds low-skilled jobs.

Meanwhile, Kathy Nicolo, a former drug addict who is still recovering from her husband's abrupt departure, has been evicted from her home, long owned by her family, because of unpaid taxes the county wrongfully claimed she owed. When the house is placed for auction, Behrani seizes the opportunity and purchases it, depleting his son's entire college fund. He plans to renovate the house and then resell it for much more than he originally paid as a first step on the way to establishing himself in real-estate investment. He moves his family from their apartment into the house. Meanwhile, when Kathy moves out, she meets Deputy Lester Burdon. They go through the system, hiring a lawyer to fight Kathy's wrongful eviction, but although the County admits the error, Behrani insists that he will not return the house unless he's paid what it's worth, not merely the low sum he paid at auction.

In desperation, Kathy goes to the house and attempts to commit suicide twice, first trying to shoot herself and then overdosing on pills. The Behranis manage to stop her both times and she is put in a bedroom to rest. Lester breaks into the house and locks the Behranis in their bathroom at gunpoint until they agree to return the house to Kathy. When Lester takes the Behranis to the county office, Behrani's son, Esmail, retrieves the gun and is shot by authorities. When Behrani finds out in the hospital that his son has died, he is overcome with grief and rage at both Lester and Kathy. He returns to the house to find Kathy still there and attempts to strangle her. Believing Kathy to be dead, he dons his Army uniform and suffocates both himself and his wife, who had been asleep in the bedroom.

Kathy and Lester are arrested and await trial. In the novel's final scene, Kathy, unable to speak after her final encounter with Behrani, mimes a request for one more cigarette.

== Film adaptation ==
In 2003 the novel was adapted into a film of the same title starring Ben Kingsley and Jennifer Connelly. While the novel suggests that experiences in Lester Burdon's youth were responsible for some of his rash decisions, the movie does not attempt to explain any of his motivations. The movie's ending differs from that of the novel, removing the final confrontation between Behrani and Kathy. The consequences of the Behranis' deaths on Kathy are also not explored in the movie.
