= List of The New York Times number-one books of 1934 =

This is a list of books that topped The New York Times best-seller list in 1934. When the list began in 1931 through 1941 it only reflected sales in the New York City area.

== Fiction ==
The following list ranks the number-one best-selling fiction books.

The two most popular books that year were So Red the Rose, by Stark Young, which held on top of the list for 17 weeks, and Lamb in His Bosom by Caroline Miller, which was on top of the list for 8 weeks.

Date	Book	Author
January 1	Anthony Adverse	Hervey Allen
January 8	Anthony Adverse	Hervey Allen
January 15	The Thin Man	Dashiell Hammett
January 22	The Thin Man	Dashiell Hammett
January 29	The Thin Man	Dashiell Hammett
February 5	Work of Art	Sinclair Lewis
February 12	Work of Art	Sinclair Lewis
February 19	Work of Art	Sinclair Lewis
February 26	Work of Art	Sinclair Lewis
March 5	Work of Art	Sinclair Lewis
March 12	Work of Art	Sinclair Lewis
March 19	Work of Art	Sinclair Lewis
March 26	Anthony Adverse	Hervey Allen
April 2	The Oppermanns	Lion Feuchtwanger
April 9	The Oppermanns	Lion Feuchtwanger
April 16	Anthony Adverse	Hervey Allen
April 23	Anthony Adverse	Hervey Allen
April 30	Seven Gothic Tales	Isak Dinesen
May 7	Tender is the Night	F. Scott Fitzgerald
May 14	Anthony Adverse	Hervey Allen
May 21	Lamb in His Bosom	Caroline Miller
May 28	Five Silver Daughters	Louis Golding
June 4	Lamb in His Bosom	Caroline Miller
June 11	Lamb in His Bosom	Caroline Miller
June 18	Lamb in His Bosom	Caroline Miller
June 25	Lamb in His Bosom	Caroline Miller
July 2	Lamb in His Bosom	Caroline Miller
July 9	Lamb in His Bosom	Caroline Miller
July 16	Lamb in His Bosom	Caroline Miller
July 23	I, Claudius	Robert Graves
July 30	Anthony Adverse	Hervey Allen
August 6	So Red the Rose	Stark Young
August 13	So Red the Rose	Stark Young
August 20	So Red the Rose	Stark Young
August 27	So Red the Rose	Stark Young
September 3	So Red the Rose	Stark Young
September 10	So Red the Rose	Stark Young
September 17	So Red the Rose	Stark Young
September 24	So Red the Rose	Stark Young
October 1	So Red the Rose	Stark Young
October 8	So Red the Rose	Stark Young
October 15	So Red the Rose	Stark Young
October 22	So Red the Rose	Stark Young
October 29	So Red the Rose	Stark Young
November 5	So Red the Rose	Stark Young
November 12	So Red the Rose	Stark Young
November 19	So Red the Rose	Stark Young
November 26	So Red the Rose	Stark Young
December 3	Lost Horizon	James Hilton
December 10	The Forty Days of Musa Dagh	Franz Werfel
December 17	The Forty Days of Musa Dagh	Franz Werfel
December 23	The Forty Days of Musa Dagh	Franz Werfel
December 30	The Forty Days of Musa Dagh	Franz Werfel

== Nonfiction ==
The following list ranks the number-one best-selling nonfiction books.

Date	Book	Author
January 1	Crowded Hours	Alice Roosevelt Longworth
January 8	Crowded Hours	Alice Roosevelt Longworth
January 15	Brazilian Adventure	Peter Fleming
January 22	Life Begins at Forty	Walter B. Pitkin
January 29	Life Begins at Forty	Walter B. Pitkin
February 5	Life Begins at Forty	Walter B. Pitkin
February 12	The Native's Return	Louis Adamic
February 19	The Native's Return	Louis Adamic
February 26	The Native's Return	Louis Adamic
March 5	The Native's Return	Louis Adamic
March 12	The Robber Barons	Matthew Josephson
March 19	The Robber Barons	Matthew Josephson
March 26	While Rome Burns	Alexander Woollcott
April 2	While Rome Burns	Alexander Woollcott
April 9	While Rome Burns	Alexander Woollcott
April 16	While Rome Burns	Alexander Woollcott
April 23	While Rome Burns	Alexander Woollcott
April 30	On Our Way	Franklin D. Roosevelt
May 7	While Rome Burns	Alexander Woollcott
May 14	Nijinsky	Romola Nijinsky
May 21	While Rome Burns	Alexander Woollcott
May 28	While Rome Burns	Alexander Woollcott
June 4	Nijinsky	Romola Nijinsky
June 11	Nijinsky	Romola Nijinsky
June 18	Nijinsky	Romola Nijinsky
June 25	While Rome Burns	Alexander Woollcott
July 2	While Rome Burns	Alexander Woollcott
July 9	While Rome Burns	Alexander Woollcott
July 16	Stars Fell on Alabama	Carl Carmer
July 23	Nijinsky	Romola Nijinsky
July 30	While Rome Burns	Alexander Woollcott
August 6	While Rome Burns	Alexander Woollcott
August 13	Stars Fell on Alabama	Carl Carmer
August 20	While Rome Burns	Alexander Woollcott
August 27	The Coming American Boom	L. L. B. Angas
September 3	English Journey	J. B. Priestley
September 10	While Rome Burns	Alexander Woollcott
September 17	While Rome Burns	Alexander Woollcott
September 24	While Rome Burns	Alexander Woollcott
October 1	While Rome Burns	Alexander Woollcott
October 8	While Rome Burns	Alexander Woollcott
October 15	The Challenge to Liberty	Herbert Hoover
October 22	Forty-Two Years in the White House	Irwin H. Hoover
October 29	Forty-Two Years in the White House	Irwin H. Hoover
November 5	Forty-Two Years in the White House	Irwin H. Hoover
November 12	While Rome Burns	Alexander Woollcott
November 19	While Rome Burns	Alexander Woollcott
November 26	While Rome Burns	Alexander Woollcott
December 3	Wine from These Grapes	Edna St. Vincent Millay
December 10	While Rome Burns	Alexander Woollcott
December 17	While Rome Burns	Alexander Woollcott
December 23	While Rome Burns	Alexander Woollcott
December 30	While Rome Burns	Alexander Woollcott

== See also ==
- Publishers Weekly list of bestselling novels in the United States in the 1930s
