= List of The New York Times number-one books of 1933 =

This is a list of books that topped The New York Times best-seller list in 1933. When the list began in 1931 through 1941 it only reflected sales in the New York City area.

== Fiction ==
The following list ranks the number-one best-selling fiction books.

The two most popular books that year were Anthony Adverse, by Hervey Allen, which held on top of the list for 26 weeks, and Ann Vickers by Sinclair Lewis, which was on top of the list for 11 weeks.

Date	Book	Author
January 2	Flowering Wilderness	John Galsworthy
January 9	Flowering Wilderness	John Galsworthy
January 16	The Last Adam	James Gould Cozzens
January 23	The Last Adam	James Gould Cozzens
January 30	Ann Vickers	Sinclair Lewis
February 6	Ann Vickers	Sinclair Lewis
February 13	Ann Vickers	Sinclair Lewis
February 20	Ann Vickers	Sinclair Lewis
February 27	Ann Vickers	Sinclair Lewis
March 6	Ann Vickers	Sinclair Lewis
March 13	Ann Vickers	Sinclair Lewis
March 20	Ann Vickers	Sinclair Lewis
March 27	Ann Vickers	Sinclair Lewis
April 3	Ann Vickers	Sinclair Lewis
April 10	Ann Vickers	Sinclair Lewis
April 17	The Werewolf of Paris	Guy Endore
April 24	Rain in the Doorway	Thorne Smith
May 1	The Werewolf of Paris	Guy Endore
May 8	As the Earth Turns	Gladys Hasty Carroll
May 15	As the Earth Turns	Gladys Hasty Carroll
May 22	The Store	T. S. Stribling
May 29	As the Earth Turns	Gladys Hasty Carroll
June 5	As the Earth Turns	Gladys Hasty Carroll
June 12	Little Man, What Now?	Hans Fallada
June 19	Little Man, What Now?	Hans Fallada
June 26	Little Man, What Now?	Hans Fallada
July 3	Anthony Adverse	Hervey Allen
July 10	Anthony Adverse	Hervey Allen
July 16	Anthony Adverse	Hervey Allen
July 24	Anthony Adverse	Hervey Allen
July 31	Anthony Adverse	Hervey Allen
August 7	Anthony Adverse	Hervey Allen
August 14	Anthony Adverse	Hervey Allen
August 21	Anthony Adverse	Hervey Allen
August 28	Anthony Adverse	Hervey Allen
September 4	Anthony Adverse	Hervey Allen
September 11	Anthony Adverse	Hervey Allen
September 18	Anthony Adverse	Hervey Allen
September 25	Anthony Adverse	Hervey Allen
October 2	Anthony Adverse	Hervey Allen
October 9	Anthony Adverse	Hervey Allen
October 16	Anthony Adverse	Hervey Allen
October 23	Anthony Adverse	Hervey Allen
October 30	Anthony Adverse	Hervey Allen
November 6	Anthony Adverse	Hervey Allen
November 13	Anthony Adverse	Hervey Allen
November 20	Anthony Adverse	Hervey Allen
November 27	Anthony Adverse	Hervey Allen
December 4	Anthony Adverse	Hervey Allen
December 11	Anthony Adverse	Hervey Allen
December 18	Anthony Adverse	Hervey Allen
December 25	Anthony Adverse	Hervey Allen

== Nonfiction ==
The following list ranks the number-one best-selling nonfiction books.

Date	Book	Author
January 2	Van Loon's Geography	Hendrik Willem van Loon
January 9	Van Loon's Geography	Hendrik Willem van Loon
January 16	The ABC of Technocracy	Frank Awkwright
January 23	The ABC of Technocracy	Frank Awkwright
January 30	The ABC of Technocracy	Frank Awkwright
February 6	Contract Bridge Blue Book, 1933	Ely Culbertson
February 13	Contract Bridge Blue Book, 1933	Ely Culbertson
February 20	British Agent	R. H. Bruce Lockhart
February 27	British Agent	R. H. Bruce Lockhart
March 6	British Agent	R. H. Bruce Lockhart
March 13	Contract Bridge Blue Book, 1933	Ely Culbertson
March 20	Culbertson's 1933 Summary	Ely Culbertson
March 27	Looking Forward	Franklin D. Roosevelt
April 3	Looking Forward	Franklin D. Roosevelt
April 10	British Agent	R. H. Bruce Lockhart
April 17	British Agent	R. H. Bruce Lockhart
April 24	Marie Antoinette	Stefan Zweig
May 1	Marie Antoinette	Stefan Zweig
May 8	Marie Antoinette	Stefan Zweig
May 15	British Agent	R. H. Bruce Lockhart
May 22	Marie Antoinette	Stefan Zweig
May 29	The House of Exile	Nora Waln
June 5	Marie Antoinette	Stefan Zweig
June 12	Always a Grand Duke	Grand Duke Alexander Mikhailovich of Russia
June 19	Marie Antoinette	Stefan Zweig
June 26	The House of Exile	Nora Waln
July 3	Marie Antoinette	Stefan Zweig
July 10	Julia Newberry's Diary	Julia Rosa Newberry
July 16	The Arches of the Years	Halliday Sutherland
July 24	The House of Exile	Nora Waln
July 31	Marie Antoinette	Stefan Zweig
August 7	Marie Antoinette	Stefan Zweig
August 14	Marie Antoinette	Stefan Zweig
August 21	Marie Antoinette	Stefan Zweig
August 28	The First World War	Laurence Stallings, editor
September 4	Marie Antoinette	Stefan Zweig
September 11	Marie Antoinette	Stefan Zweig
September 18	The Crime of Cuba	Carleton Beals
September 25	Marie Antoinette	Stefan Zweig
October 2	Marie Antoinette	Stefan Zweig
October 9	Life Begins at Forty	Walter B. Pitkin
October 16	More Power to You!	Walter B. Pitkin
October 23	More Power to You!	Walter B. Pitkin
October 30	More Power to You!	Walter B. Pitkin
November 6	More Power to You!	Walter B. Pitkin
November 13	Crowded Hours	Alice Roosevelt Longworth
November 20	Crowded Hours	Alice Roosevelt Longworth
November 27	Crowded Hours	Alice Roosevelt Longworth
December 4	Crowded Hours	Alice Roosevelt Longworth
December 11	Crowded Hours	Alice Roosevelt Longworth
December 18	The Man of the Renaissance	Ralph Roeder
December 25	Crowded Hours	Alice Roosevelt Longworth

== See also ==
- Publishers Weekly list of bestselling novels in the United States in the 1930s
