= Publishers Weekly list of bestselling novels in the United States in the 1930s =

This is a list of bestselling novels in the United States in the 1930s, as determined by Publishers Weekly. The list features the most popular novels of each year from 1930 through 1939.

The standards set for inclusion in the lists – which, for example, led to the exclusion of the novels in the Harry Potter series from the lists for the 1990s and 2000s – are currently unknown.

== 1930 ==
1. Cimarron by Edna Ferber
2. Exile by Warwick Deeping
3. The Woman of Andros by Thornton Wilder
4. Years of Grace by Margaret Ayer Barnes
5. Angel Pavement by J. B. Priestley
6. The Door by Mary Roberts Rinehart
7. Rogue Herries by Hugh Walpole
8. Chances by A. Hamilton Gibbs
9. Young Man of Manhattan by Katharine Brush
10. Twenty-Four Hours by Louis Bromfield

== 1931 ==
1. The Good Earth by Pearl S. Buck
2. Shadows on the Rock by Willa Cather
3. A White Bird Flying by Bess Streeter Aldrich
4. Grand Hotel by Vicki Baum
5. Years of Grace by Margaret Ayer Barnes
6. The Road Back by Erich Maria Remarque
7. The Bridge of Desire by Warwick Deeping
8. Back Street by Fannie Hurst
9. Finch's Fortune by Mazo de la Roche
10. Maid in Waiting by John Galsworthy

== 1932 ==
1. The Good Earth by Pearl S. Buck
2. The Fountain by Charles Langbridge Morgan
3. Sons by Pearl S. Buck
4. Magnolia Street by Louis Golding
5. The Sheltered Life by Ellen Glasgow
6. Old Wine and New by Warwick Deeping
7. Mary's Neck by Booth Tarkington
8. Magnificent Obsession by Lloyd C. Douglas
9. Inheritance by Phyllis Bentley
10. Three Loves by A. J. Cronin

== 1933 ==
1. Anthony Adverse by Hervey Allen
2. As the Earth Turns by Gladys Hasty Carroll
3. Ann Vickers by Sinclair Lewis
4. Magnificent Obsession by Lloyd C. Douglas
5. One More River by John Galsworthy
6. Forgive Us Our Trespassers by Lloyd C. Douglas
7. The Master of Jalna by Mazo de la Roche
8. Miss Bishop by Bess Streeter Aldrich
9. The Farm by Louis Bromfield
10. Little Man, What Now? by Hans Fallada

== 1934 ==
1. Anthony Adverse by Hervey Allen
2. Lamb in His Bosom by Caroline Miller
3. So Red the Rose by Stark Young
4. Good-bye, Mr. Chips by James Hilton
5. Within This Present by Margaret Ayer Barnes
6. Work of Art by Sinclair Lewis
7. Private Worlds by Phyllis Bottome
8. Mary Peters by Mary Ellen Chase
9. Oil for the Lamps of China by Alice Tisdale Hobart
10. Seven Gothic Tales by Isak Dinesen

== 1935 ==
1. Green Light by Lloyd C. Douglas
2. Vein of Iron by Ellen Glasgow
3. Of Time and the River by Thomas Wolfe
4. Time Out of Mind by Rachel Field
5. Good-bye, Mr. Chips by James Hilton
6. The Forty Days of Musa Dagh by Franz Werfel
7. Heaven's My Destination by Thornton Wilder
8. Lost Horizon by James Hilton
9. Come and Get It by Edna Ferber
10. Europa by Robert Briffault

== 1936 ==
1. Gone with the Wind by Margaret Mitchell
2. The Last Puritan by George Santayana
3. Sparkenbroke by Charles Langbridge Morgan
4. Drums Along the Mohawk by Walter D. Edmonds
5. It Can't Happen Here by Sinclair Lewis
6. White Banners by Lloyd C. Douglas
7. The Hurricane by Charles Nordhoff and James Norman Hall
8. The Thinking Reed by Rebecca West
9. The Doctor by Mary Roberts Rinehart
10. Eyeless in Gaza by Aldous Huxley

== 1937 ==
1. Gone with the Wind by Margaret Mitchell
2. Northwest Passage by Kenneth Roberts
3. The Citadel by A. J. Cronin
4. And So—Victoria by Vaughan Wilkins
5. Drums Along the Mohawk by Walter D. Edmonds
6. The Years by Virginia Woolf
7. Theatre by W. Somerset Maugham
8. Of Mice and Men by John Steinbeck
9. The Rains Came by Louis Bromfield
10. We Are Not Alone by James Hilton

== 1938 ==
1. The Yearling by Marjorie Kinnan Rawlings
2. The Citadel by A. J. Cronin
3. My Son, My Son! by Howard Spring
4. Rebecca by Daphne du Maurier
5. Northwest Passage by Kenneth Roberts
6. All This, and Heaven Too by Rachel Field
7. The Rains Came by Louis Bromfield
8. And Tell of Time by Laura Krey
9. The Mortal Storm by Phyllis Bottome
10. Action at Aquila by Hervey Allen

== 1939 ==
1. The Grapes of Wrath by John Steinbeck
2. All This, and Heaven Too by Rachel Field
3. Rebecca by Daphne du Maurier
4. Wickford Point by John P. Marquand
5. Escape by Ethel Vance
6. Disputed Passage by Lloyd C. Douglas
7. The Yearling by Marjorie Kinnan Rawlings
8. The Tree of Liberty by Elizabeth Page
9. The Nazarene by Sholem Asch
10. Kitty Foyle by Christopher Morley
