= Krey (surname) =

Krey is a surname. Notable people with the surname include:

- August C. Krey (1887–1961), American medievalist
- Laura Krey (1890–1985), American author
- Philip Krey (born 1950), American Lutheran seminary president
- Solveig Krey (born 1963), Norwegian naval officer

== See also ==
- Karey (disambiguation)
