= So Red the Rose =

So Red the Rose may refer to:

- So Red the Rose (album), 1985 debut studio album by Arcadia
- So Red the Rose (film), 1935 film by King Vidor
- So Red the Rose (novel), 1934 novel by Stark Young
