= Anthony Adverse =

1936 film directed by Mervyn LeRoy

- Theatrical release poster
- Directed by: Mervyn LeRoy
- Screenplay by: Sheridan Gibney; Milton Krims
- Based on: Anthony Adverse; 1933 novel by Hervey Allen
- Produced by: Hal B. Wallis; Jack L. Warner
- Starring: Fredric March; Olivia de Havilland
- Cinematography: Tony Gaudio
- Edited by: Ralph Dawson
- Music by: Erich Wolfgang Korngold
- Production company: Warner Bros. Pictures
- Distributed by: Warner Bros. Pictures
- Release dates: July 29, 1936 (Los Angeles); August 29, 1936 (U.S.)
- Running time: 141 minutes
- Country: United States
- Language: English
- Budget: $1,192,000
- Box office: $2,750,000

Anthony Adverse is a 1936 American epic historical drama film directed by Mervyn LeRoy and starring Fredric March and Olivia de Havilland. The screenplay by Sheridan Gibney draws elements of its plot from eight of the nine books in Hervey Allen's 1933 historical novel, Anthony Adverse. Abandoned at a convent as an infant, Anthony comes of age in the tumultuous turn of the 18th to the 19th century, the age of Napoleon. The audience is privy to many truths in Anthony's life, including the tragic story of his origins and the fact that the wealthy merchant who adopts him is his grandfather. Most important of all, Anthony believes that his beloved Angela abandoned him without a word, when in fact she left a note telling him that the theatrical troupe was going to Rome. The gust of wind that blows the note away is one of many fateful and fatal events in Anthony's story.

The film received four Academy Awards, including the inaugural Academy Award for Best Actress in a Supporting Role, given to Gale Sondergaard for her performance as the villainous Faith Paleologus.

== Plot ==
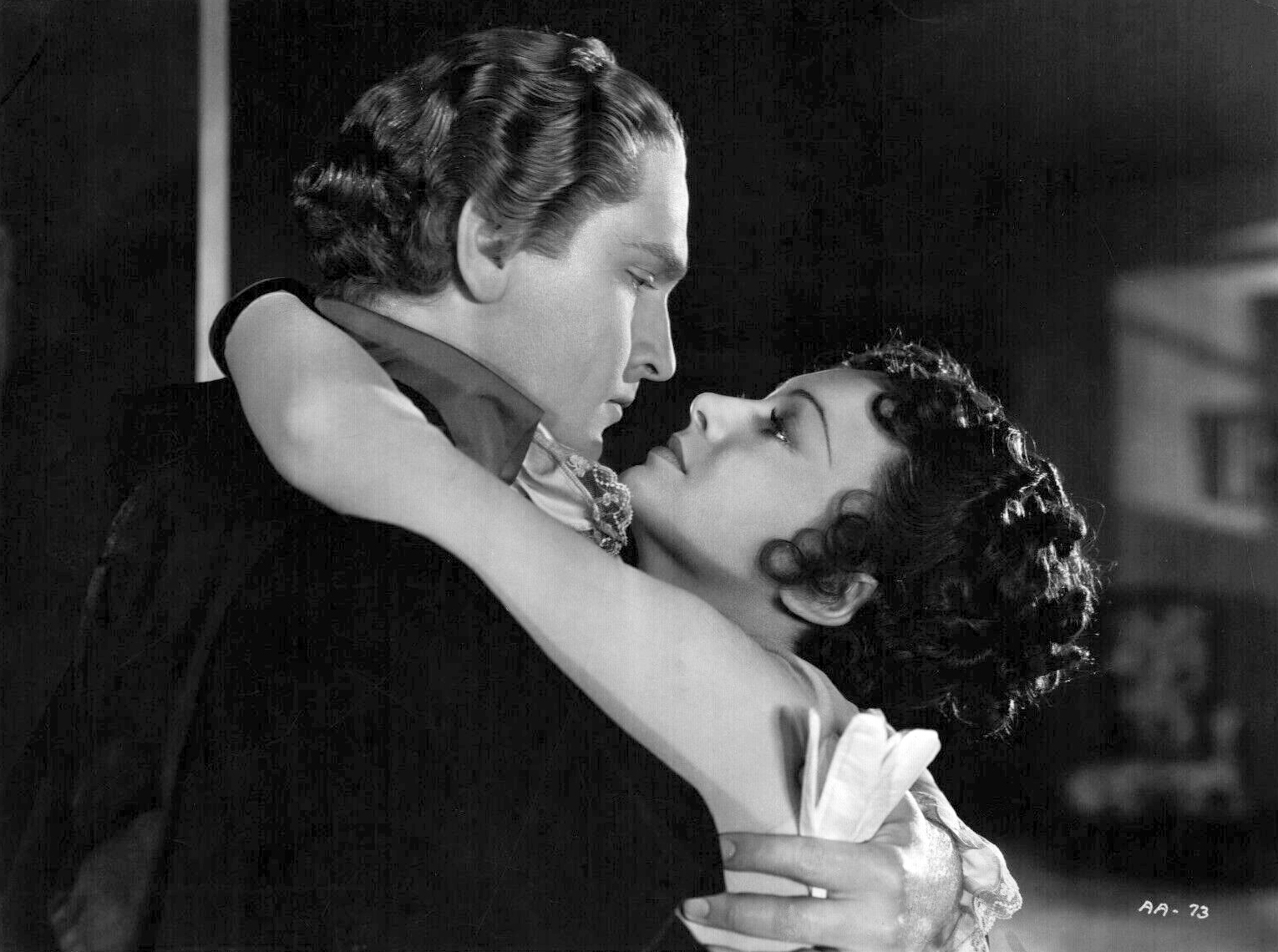
Fredric March and Olivia de Havilland in Anthony Adverse

In 1773, young Scottish woman Maria Bonnyfeather is the new bride of middle-aged Spanish Marquis Don Luis. The consummation of their marriage is postponed until he is cured of gout at a famous spa. Meanwhile, Maria's true love, Denis Moore, follows them and stays near their château. While the marquis is away taking the cure, they meet in the woods, and after three months Maria tells him she is carrying his child. The marquis returns home, cured, and Maria is horrified at what awaits her. The lovers plan to flee that night, but the marquis discovers Maria waiting for Denis. Don Luis takes her away, but Denis pursues them to an inn, where Don Luis kills him in a sword duel.

Months later, Maria dies giving birth to her son at a chalet in the Italian Alps. Don Luis leaves the infant in the foundling wheel of a convent near Leghorn. The nuns christen him Anthony because he was found on the feast day of St. Anthony the Great. Don Luis lies to Maria's father, wealthy merchant John Bonnyfeather, telling him that the infant also died. Ten years later, by chance, Anthony is apprenticed to Bonnyfeather, who discovers his relationship to the boy but keeps it a secret. The only explanation for Don Luis’ behavior is that Maria's child was illegitimate, and Bonnyfeather cannot bear to have his daughter—or his grandson—bear that stigma. He gives the boy the surname Adverse acknowledging the difficult start in life.

Anthony and the cook's daughter, Angela Guisseppi fall in love. Angela wants to become a great singer. Anthony wants to serve Bonnyfeather and marry Angela, but Angela's father wins the lottery and the family leaves Leghorn. Years later, Anthony finds her, singing in the opera chorus. Eventually, they wed. Soon after the ceremony, Bonnyfeather sends Anthony to Havana to save Bonnyfeather's fortune from a laggard debtor, the trading firm Gallego & Sons. On the day his ship sails, he and Angela are supposed to meet at the convent, but she arrives first, and he is late. Unable to wait any longer, she leaves a note outside the convent to inform him that she is leaving for Rome with her opera company, but the note is blown away. Confused and upset, he sails without her. Meanwhile, assuming he has abandoned her, she continues her career.

Gallego has quit Havana. Anthony leaves to take control of Gallego & Sons' only remaining asset—a slave trading post on the Pongo River in Africa, so he can recover Bonnyfeather's debt. Three years in the slave trade corrupts him, and he takes slave girl Neleta into his bed. After his friend, Brother François, is crucified and killed by natives, Anthony returns to Italy to find Bonnyfeather has died. His housekeeper, Faith Paleologus (Don Luis' longtime co-conspirator and now wife), has inherited Bonnyfeather's fortune.

Anthony goes to Paris to claim his inheritance and is reunited with his friend, banker Vincent Nolte. He saves Nolte from bankruptcy by loaning him his entire fortune, having learned from Brother François that "There's something besides money and power". Meanwhile, all Paris is buzzing with gossip about Mademoiselle Georges, the famous opera star and mistress of Napoleon Bonaparte, and the diamond necklace he has given to her, although Josephine wanted it.

Impresario Debrulle reunites Anthony with Angela, who bore him a son. A delighted Angela tells him that she is singing at the opera, and he goes, with Nolte. Searching the program in vain for her name, he hears her voice coming from the stage. He exclaims, “That's Angela” and Nolte replies, “That's Mademoiselle Georges!” Angela continues the aria and emerges from the shadows, descending a staircase. Wearing Napoleon's gift, she whispers “Goodbye, Anthony,” as he stands and leaves the box.

Shaken, he returns home to find his son, with a letter from Angela saying that Anthony is better suited to raise the boy. Anthony and the boy sail for America hoping for a better life.

== Cast ==
- Fredric March as Anthony Adverse
- Olivia de Havilland as Angela Giuseppe
- Donald Woods as Vincent Nolte
- Anita Louise as Maria
- Edmund Gwenn as John Bonnyfeather
- Claude Rains as Marquis Don Luis
- Rollo Lloyd as Napoleon Bonaparte
- Louis Hayward as Denis Moore
- Gale Sondergaard as Faith Paleologus
- Steffi Duna as Neleta
- Billy Mauch as Anthony Adverse (age 10)
- Akim Tamiroff as Carlo Cibo
- Ralph Morgan as Debrulle
- Henry O'Neill as Father Xavier
- Pedro de Cordoba as Brother François
- Alma Lloyd as Florence Udney (as an adult)
- Marilyn Knowlden as Florence Udney (as a child)
- Anne Howard as Angela as a child (uncredited)

== Production ==
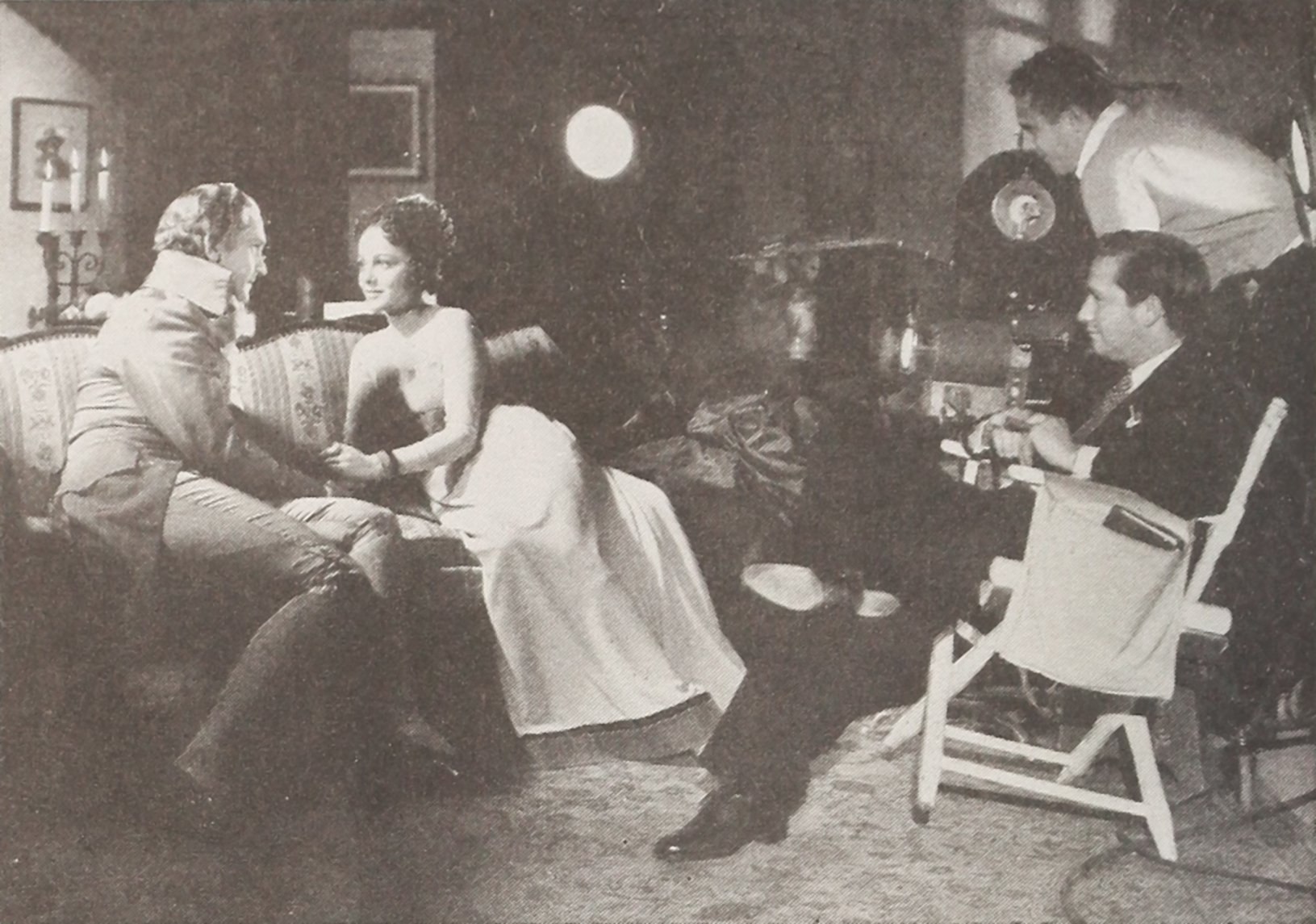
Mervyn LeRoy (seated right) directing March and De Havilland; behind LeRoy is cinematographer Tony Gaudio

Before casting Fredric March to costar with Olivia de Havilland, Warner Bros. considered Robert Donat, Leslie Howard, and George Brent for the title role. The studio during preproduction also intended to cast Errol Flynn in support of March, but Flynn became so popular with moviegoers after his performance in Captain Blood in 1935 that Warner Bros. assigned him to star instead in the 1936 film The Charge of the Light Brigade.

Billy Mauch plays the young Anthony Adverse in the earlier scenes. Warner Bros. discovered Mauch had a twin, and it put them both under contract. They were given a starring vehicle in The Prince and the Pauper.

Film editor Ralph Dawson provided some statistics: a shooting script of 250 pages; 1,098 camera set-ups, plus another 200 scenes prepared by special effects (including superimposed titles); 600,000+ feet of positive print film delivered to his cutting room, yielding a finished film of 12,250 feet.

== Reception ==
=== Critical response ===
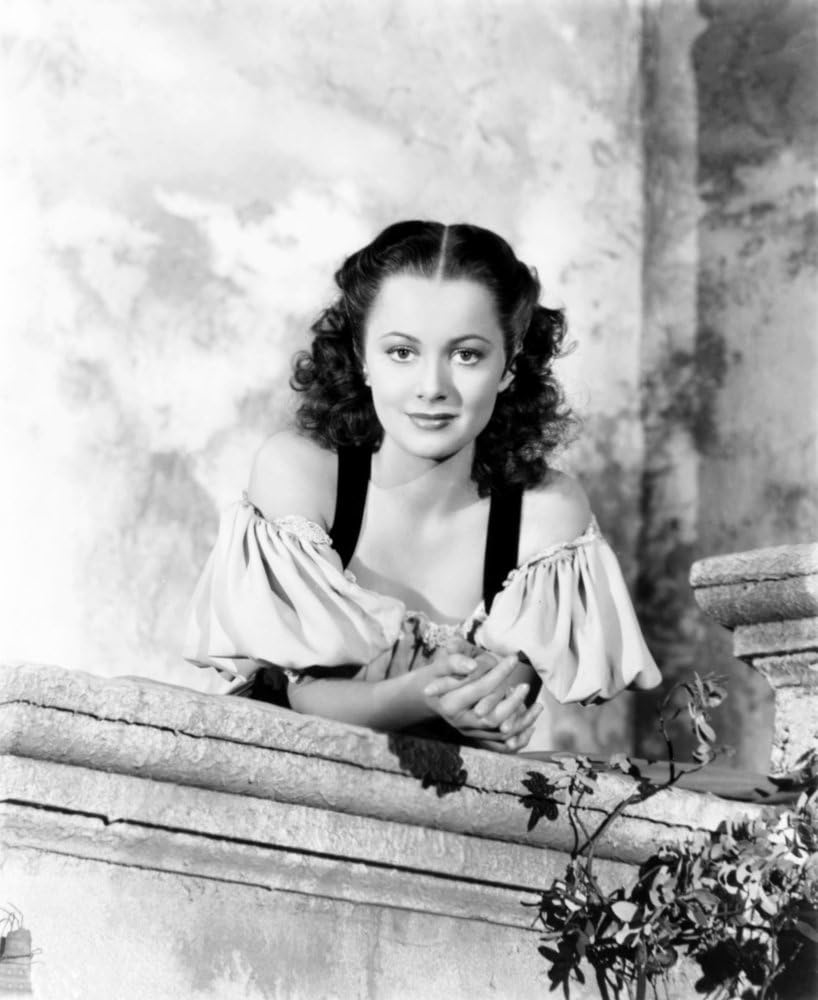
Olivia de Havilland in Anthony Adverse

In his 1936 review, The New York Times critic Frank S. Nugent panned "Warner's gargantuan film":

Speaking for ourselves, we found it a bulky, rambling and indecisive photoplay which has not merely taken liberties with the letter of the original but with its spirit...For all its sprawling length, [the novel] was cohesive and well rounded. Most of its picaresque quality has been lost in the screen version; its philosophy is vague, its characterization blurred and its story so loosely knit and episodic that its telling seems interminable. A few years back we devoted the better part of a British week-end to the reading of Mr. Allen's little pamphlet and we enjoyed it. Yesterday we spent only a fraction more than two hours watching its progress on the screen and we squirmed like a small boy in Sunday school.

Writing for The Spectator, Graham Greene expressed similar views, acerbically noting of the film that it "goes on too long, otherwise it might have been the funniest film since The Crusades". Variety described it as "a bit choppy" and "a bit long-winded" as well; but the popular trade magazine praised Fredric March's performance, adding that he was "an ace choice, playing the role to the hilt." Film Daily wrote that Anthony Adverse "easily ranks among the leading pictures of the talking screen" and called the production's acting "flawless". "I don't think Mr. March has done any better piece of work than this", noted John Mosher in his positive review for The New Yorker.

The film was named one of the National Board of Review's Top Ten pictures of the year and ranked eighth in the Film Daily annual critics' poll. In a much later review, however, Reverend Austin Spencer also found the film adaptation—when compared to the novel—inadequate, especially in its portrayal of the personal challenges that confronted the story's protagonist:

In the book as written and published, Anthony Adverse's far-ranging life was clearly intended to be a spiritual journey at least as much as a physical one. Befitting with his name, he goes through great adversity to emerge a better man - renouncing material possessions in general and the owning of slaves in particular, and aspiring with increasing success to emulate the saintly, martyred Brother François. In the film, all this was chopped off and amputated by cutting off the book's plotline in the middle. The film's Anthony Adverse is in effect denied the spiritual redemption which his literary creator intended for him. Possibly this was simply due to the fact that a normal length film could not accommodate so many adventures and changes of fortune over three continents. But I have a sneaking suspicion that some of the film-makers considered 'too much Christianity' as endangering a film's box office success. Anyway, I strongly recommend to anyone seeing the film to also read the book and find for themselves what they missed.

On TCM, film critic Leonard Maltin gives the picture a positive review of 3.5/4 stars, praising the "Blockbuster filmization of Hervey Allen bestseller ... of young man gaining maturity through adventures in various parts of early 19th-century Europe, Cuba, and Africa" and the film's cinematography and "rousing musical score", both winners of Academy Awards.

On the review aggregator website Rotten Tomatoes, 18% of 11 critics' reviews are positive, with an average rating of 4.3/10. It is the lowest-rated film to ever be nominated for Best Picture film on the website.

=== Box office ===
The film was Warner Bros.' most popular release of 1936. It was also the studio's most expensive production that year, with an overall budget of $1,192,000. That hefty expense, however, proved to be a wise investment, for Anthony Adverse generated $1,558,000 in profits at the box office for Warner Bros., earning the studio $1,783,000 domestically and $967,000 in foreign markets.

== Academy Awards ==
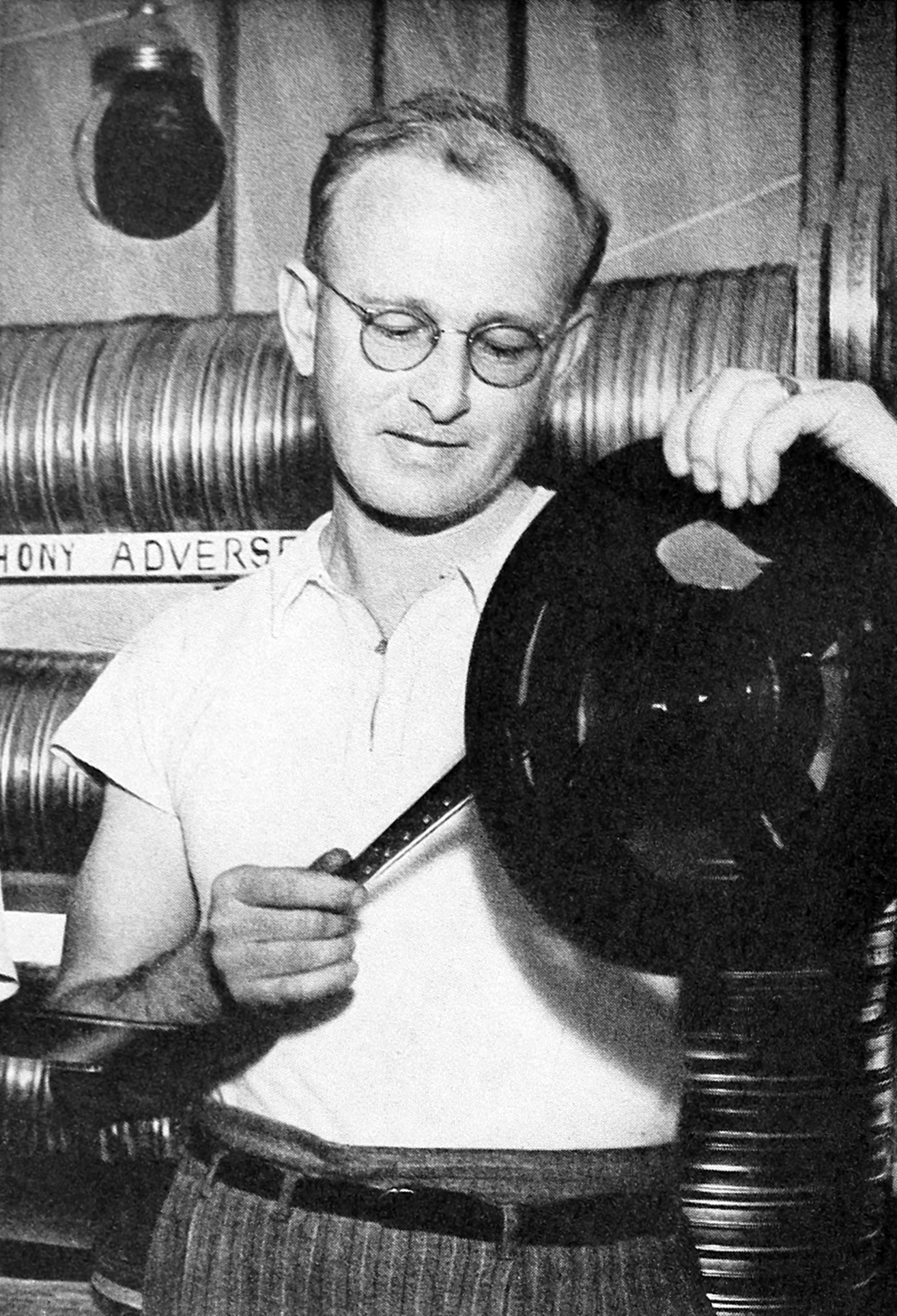
Film editor Ralph Dawson with film reels and canisters for Anthony Adverse

Awards

- Best Actress in a Supporting Role: Gale Sondergaard
- Best Cinematography: Gaetano Gaudio
- Best Film Editing: Ralph Dawson
- Best Music (Scoring): Warner Bros. Studio Music Department, Leo F. Forbstein, head of department (Score by Erich Wolfgang Korngold)

Nominations

- Outstanding Production: Warner Bros.
- Best Assistant Director: William Cannon
- Best Art Direction: Anton Grot

== Cultural references ==
The initial theme of the second movement of Erich Wolfgang Korngold's violin concerto was drawn from the music he composed for the film.

English singer Julia Gilbert adopted the name of the film's main character when recording for the London-based él record label in the late 1980s.

Screen legend Tony Curtis (1925–2010), who was born Bernard Schwartz, named himself for the titular character: The novel from which this film was adapted was the actor's favorite. Curtis, who was established as a star in The Prince Who Was a Thief (1951), was buried with a Stetson hat, an Armani scarf, driving gloves, an iPhone and a copy of his favorite novel Anthony Adverse.

Jack Benny parodied Anthony Adverse on the October 11 and 18 episodes of his "Jell-O Show" in 1936.

In the 1934 short comedy What, No Men!, when their plane lands in "Indian Country" and Gus (El Brendel) is told to throw out the anchor, he tosses out a rope attached to a huge book titled Anthony Adverse.

In the 1949 cartoon Hare Do, a marquee at a theater advertises the movie.
