= Julia Peterkin =

American novelist

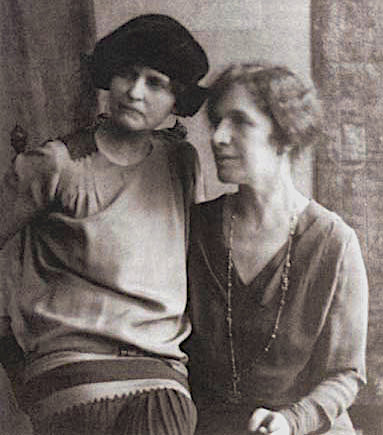
- Doris Ulmann (left) and Peterkin (right)
- Born: October 31, 1880; Laurens County, South Carolina, U.S.
- Died: August 10, 1961 (aged 80)
- Education: Converse University (BA, MA)
- Occupation: Author

Julia Peterkin (October 31, 1880 – August 10, 1961) was an American author from South Carolina, who advocated for African Americans and wrote about the portrayals of the southern life. In 1929 she won a Pulitzer Prize for her novel Scarlet Sister Mary. She wrote several novels about the plantation South, especially the Gullah people of the Low country. As a white author, she developed a unique perspective on the African American lifestyle during her time. She was one of the few white authors who wrote about the African-American experience. She collaborated with photographer Doris Ulmann on Roll, Jordan, Roll.

== Life and career ==
Julia Mood was born in Laurens County, South Carolina. Her father was a physician, and she was the third of his four children. Her mother died soon after her birth, and her father later married Janie Brogdon. Janie was the mother of Henry Ashleigh Mood, Julia's half-brother and her father's fourth child. He became a doctor.

In 1896, at age 16, Julia Mood graduated from Converse College in Spartanburg, South Carolina; she earned her master's degree there a year later. She taught at the public school in Fort Motte, South Carolina for a few years, then married William George Peterkin in 1903. He was a planter who owned Lang Syne, a 2,000-acre (8.1 km^{2}) cotton plantation near Fort Motte.

She began writing short stories, inspired by the everyday life and management of the plantation. She was described as audacious as well as gracious. Peterkin sent highly assertive letters to people she did not know and had never met. For example, she wrote to authors Carl Sandburg and H. L. Mencken, and included samples of her writing about the Gullah culture of coastal South Carolina. Living chiefly on the plantation, she invited Sandburg, Mencken, and other prominent people to the plantation.

Sandburg, who lived within a day's travel in Flat Rock, North Carolina, made a visit. Although Mencken did not visit, he became Peterkin's literary agent in her early career, a possible testament to her persuasive letters. Eventually, Mencken led her to Alfred Knopf, who published Green Thursday, her first book, in 1924.

In addition to a number of subsequent novels, her short stories were published in magazines and newspaper throughout her career. Peterkin was among the few white authors to specialize in the African-American experience.

She won a Pulitzer Prize in 1929 for her novel Scarlet Sister Mary. Dr. Richard S. Burton, the chairperson of Pulitzer's fiction-literature jury, recommended that the first prize go to the novel Victim and Victor by John Rathbone Oliver. The School of Journalism chose Peterkin's book. Burton resigned from the jury.

The book aroused some controversy in the South. The public library in the small town of Gaffney, South Carolina classified it as obscene and banned it. However, The Gaffney Ledger published the complete book in serial form.

Peterkin performed as an actress, playing the main character in Ibsen's Hedda Gabler at the Town Theatre in Columbia, South Carolina, beginning in February 1932.

In 1933, Peterkin was contacted by Caroline Pafford Miller of Baxley, Georgia. Miller was seeking a publisher for her first novel Lamb in His Bosom, and hoped to enlist Peterkin's help. Peterkin forwarded Miller's name and manuscript to her publisher. In 1933, Harper released Lamb in His Bosom. Miller won the Pulitzer Prize for the novel in 1934.

== Legacy ==
- In 1998, the Department of English and Creative Writing at her alma mater Converse College established The Julia Peterkin Award for poetry, open to everyone.

== Works ==
- Green Thursday: Stories, New York: Alfred Knopf, 1924.
- Black April, Indianapolis: Bobbs Merrill, 1927.
- Scarlet Sister Mary, Indianapolis: Bobbs-Merrill, 1928, awarded the Pulitzer Prize. It was adapted as a play of the same name, opening on Broadway in 1930, with Ethel Barrymore.
- Bright Skin, Indianapolis: Bobbs Merrill, 1932
- Roll, Jordan, Roll, New York, R.O. Ballou, 1933, with photographic studies of the Gullah by Doris Ulmann
- A Plantation Christmas, Boston and New York, Houghton Mifflin, 1934

Julia Peterkin used the Gullah language in many of her novels and stories. Writer and anthropologist Zora Neale Hurston used Negro dialect in her novels, contrary to the practice of the other writers in the Harlem Renaissance. Some objected in print to such conventions. Hurston wrote that she had met Peterkin and began a correspondence,, but no letters between them have been found.

== Awards ==
- 1929, Pulitzer Prize for Fiction, Scarlet Sister Mary

== See also ==
- South Carolina literature
