= Doris Ulmann =

American photographer (1882–1934)

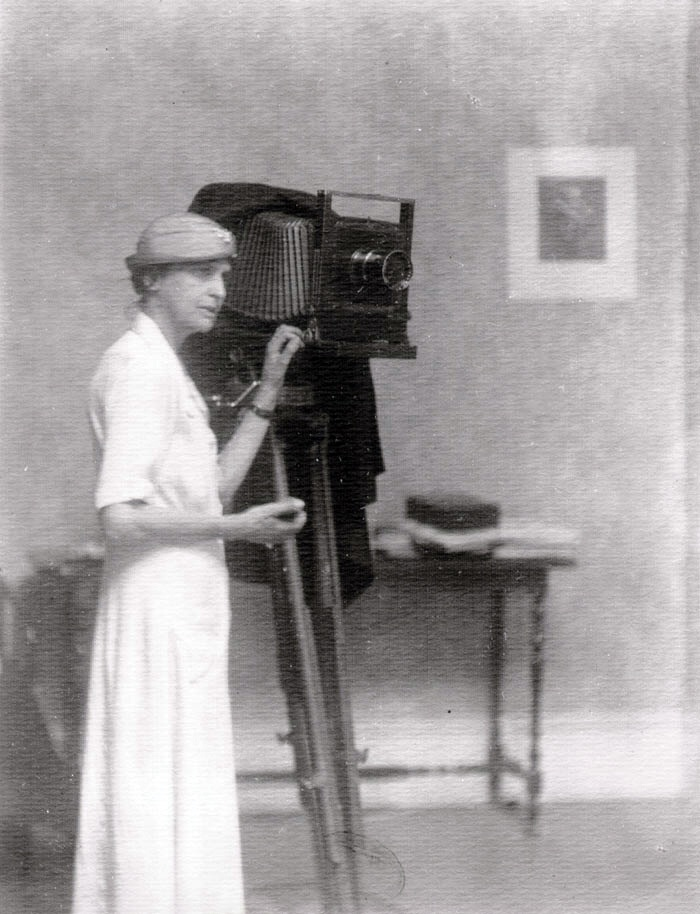
- Ulmann c. 1910
- Born: May 29, 1882; New York City, New York
- Died: August 28, 1934 (aged 52); New York City, New York
- Education: Ethical Culture Fieldston School, Clarence H. White School of Modern Photography
- Occupation: Photographer
- Parent(s): Bernhard and Gertrude (Mass) Ulmann

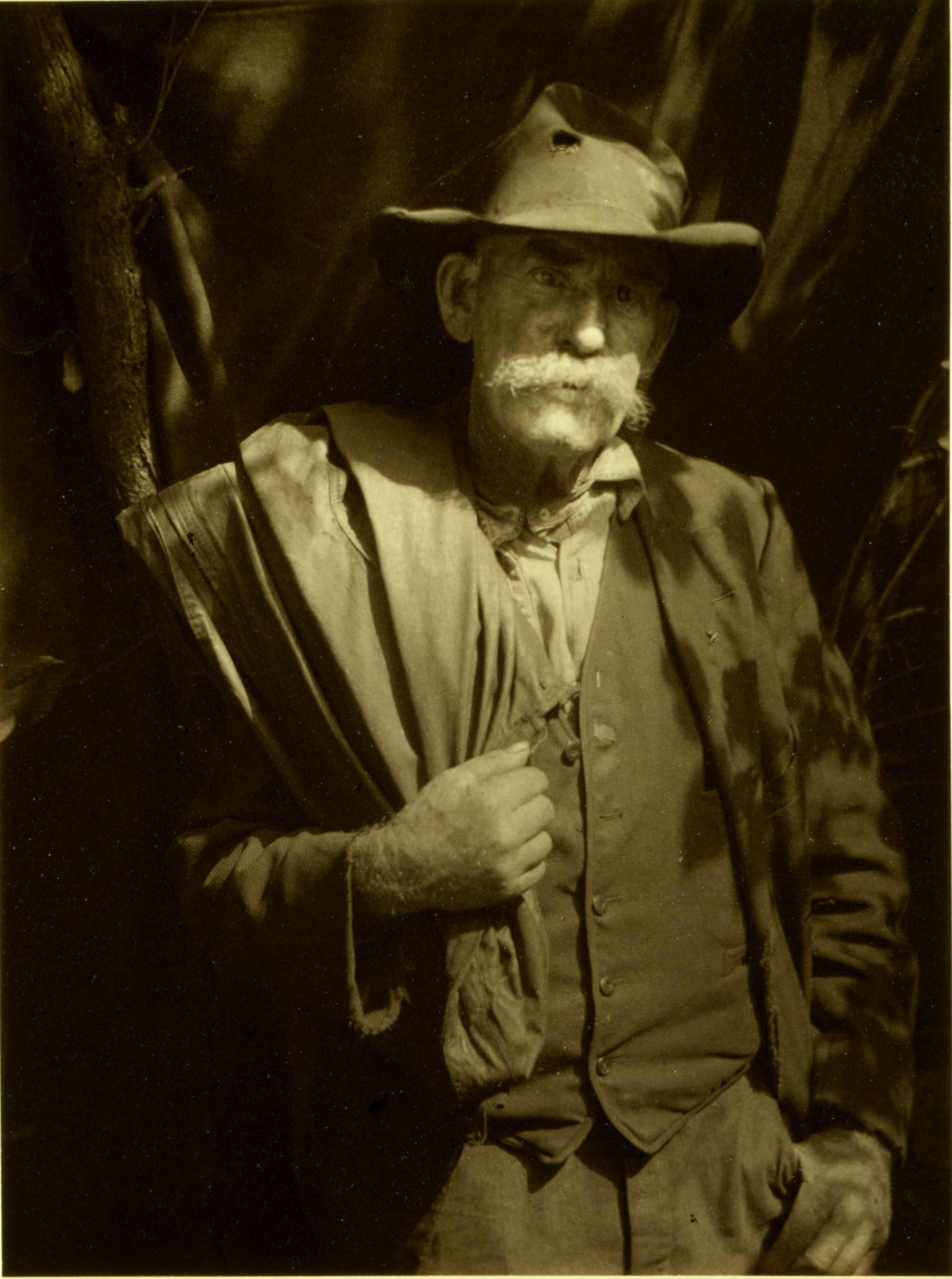
Ulmann's Southern mountaineer

Doris Ulmann (May 29, 1882 – August 28, 1934) was an American photographer, best known for her portraits of the people of Appalachia, particularly craftsmen and musicians, made between 1928 and 1934. She collaborated with writer Julia Peterkin on Roll, Jordan, Roll.

== Early life and education ==
Doris Ulmann was a native of New York City, the daughter of Bernhard and Gertrude (Mass) Ulmann. Educated at the Ethical Culture Fieldston School, a socially liberal organization that championed individual worth regardless of ethnic background or economic condition and Columbia University, she intended to become a teacher of psychology. Her interest in photography was at first a hobby but after 1918 she devoted herself to the art professionally. She practiced Pictorialism and was a member of the Pictorial Photographers of America. Ulmann documented the rural people of the South, particularly the mountain peoples of Appalachia and the Gullahs of the Sea Islands, with a profound respect for her sitters and an ethnographer's eye for culture. Ulmann was trained as a pictorialist and graduated from the Clarence H. White School of Modern Photography. Other students of the school who went on to become notable photographers include Margaret Bourke-White, Anne Brigman, Dorothea Lange, Paul Outerbridge, and Karl Struss. Her work was exhibited in various New York galleries, and published in Theatre Arts Monthly, Mentor, Scribner's Magazine, and Survey Graphic.

== Career ==
Ulmann was married for a time to Dr. Charles H. Jaeger, a fellow Pictorialist photographer and an orthopedic surgeon on the staff of Columbia University Medical School and a likely connection for her 1920 Hoeber publication The Faculty of the College of Physicians & Surgeons, Columbia University in the City of New York: Twenty-Four portraits. This was followed in 1922 by the publication of her Book of Portraits of the Medical Faculty of the Johns Hopkins University; the 1925 A Portrait Gallery of American Editors, and in 1933, Roll, Jordan Roll, the text by Julia Peterkin. The fine art edition of Roll, Jordan Roll is considered to be one of the more beautiful books ever produced.

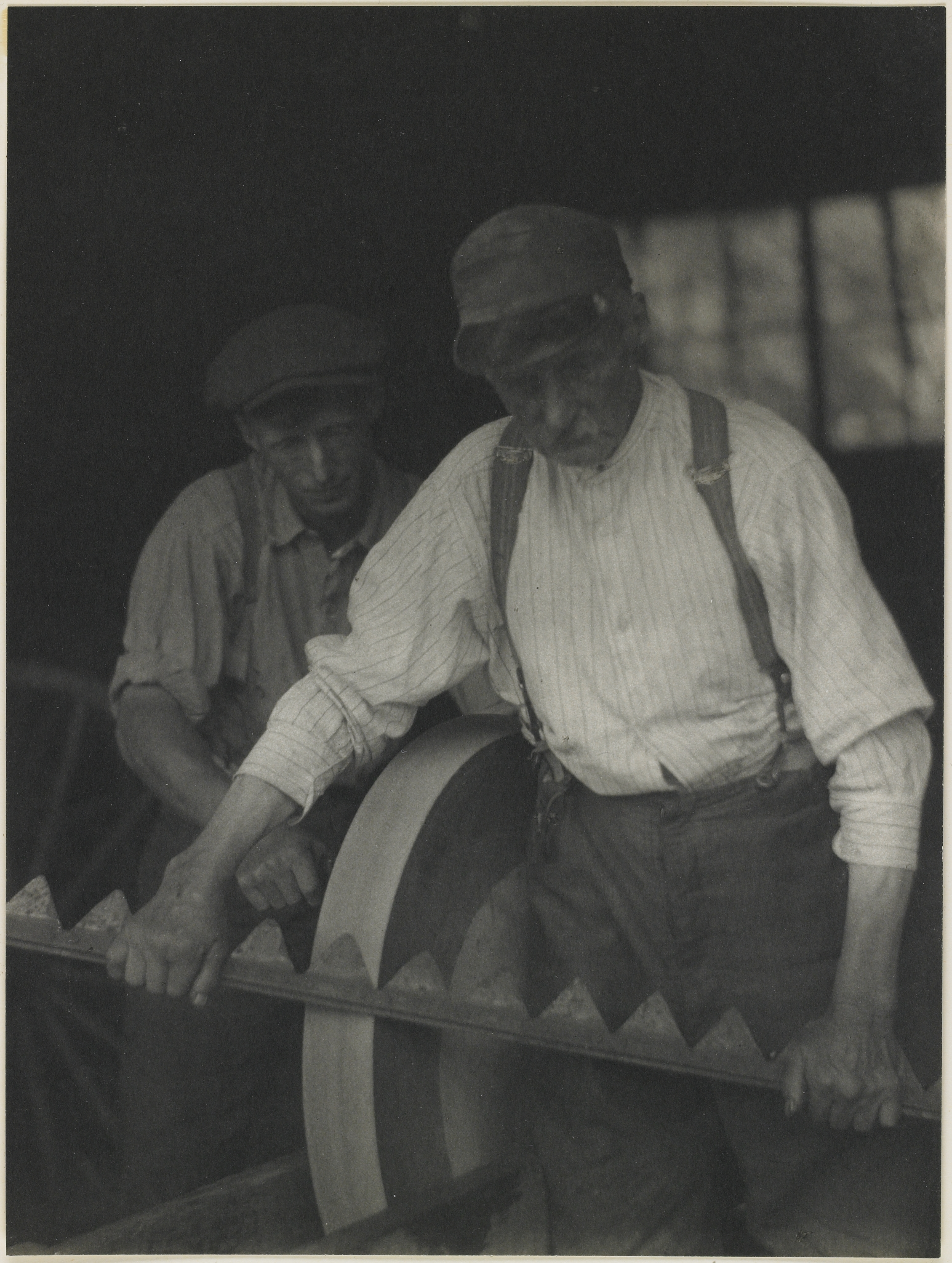
Two Men at Work; c. 1916-1925; Platinum print

In an interview with Dale Warren of Bookman, Doris Ulmann referred to her particular interest in portraits. "The faces of men and women in the street are probably as interesting as literary faces, but my particular human angle leads me to men and women who write. I am not interested exclusively in literary faces, because I have been more deeply moved by some of my mountaineers than by any literary person. A face that has the marks of having lived intensely, that expresses some phase of life, some dominant quality or intellectual power, constitutes for me an interesting face. For this reason the face of an older person, perhaps not beautiful in the strictest sense, is usually more appealing than the face of a younger person who has scarcely been touched by life."

Ulmann's early work includes a series of portraits of prominent intellectuals, artists and writers: William Butler Yeats, John Dewey, Max Eastman, Sinclair Lewis, Lewis Mumford, Joseph Wood Krutch, Martha Graham, Anna Pavlova, Paul Robeson, and Lillian Gish. From 1927, Ulmann was assisted on her rural travels by John Jacob Niles, a musician and folklorist who collected ballads while Ulmann photographed. In 1932 she was contacted by Orie Latham Hatcher, president of the Southern Woman's Educational Alliance, urging her to consider documenting the people of Appalachia for their literature and fundraising, and she accepted the commission. This led to one of her most important images, documenting a racially mixed musical group. Also in 1932 Ulmann began her most important series, assembling documentation of Appalachian folk art and crafts for Allen H. Eaton's landmark 1937 book, Handicrafts of the Southern Highlands.

== Death and legacy ==
In failing health, Ulmann collapsed in August 1934 while working near Asheville, North Carolina, and returned to New York. Ulmann died August 28, 1934.

Upon Ulmann's death, a foundation she had established took custody of her images. Allen Eaton, John Jacob Niles, Olive Dame Campbell (of the John C. Campbell Folk School in Brasstown, North Carolina), Ulmann's brother-in-law Henry L. Necarsulmer, and Berea schoolteacher Helen Dingman were named trustees. Samuel H. Lifshey, a New York commercial photographer, developed the negatives Ulmann had exposed during her final trip, and then made proof prints from the vast archive of more than 10,000 glass plate negatives. (Lifshey also developed the 2,000 exposed negatives from Ulmann's last expedition, and produced the prints for Eaton's book.) The proof prints were mounted into albums, which were annotated by John Jacob Niles and Allen Eaton, chair of the foundation and another noted folklorist, to indicate names of the sitters and dates of capture. In 1971, more than 60 of her photos were published by the Jargon Society in The Appalachian Photographs of Doris Ulmann, with an introduction by John Jacob Niles.

The primary repository of Ulmann's work is at the University of Oregon Libraries' Special Collections. The Doris Ulmann collection, PH038, includes 2,739 silver gelatin glass plate negatives, 304 original matted prints, and 79 albums (containing over 10,000 Lifshey proof prints) assembled by the Doris Ulmann Foundation between 1934 and 1937. The silver gelatin glass plate negatives are the only known remaining Ulmann negatives. Of the 304 matted photographs, approximately half are platinum prints that were mounted and signed by Ulmann; the others are silver gelatin prints developed by Lifshey. Berea College hosts a collection of over 3100 images, primarily of the Appalachian region and the Berea area. Additional collections can be found at The University of Kentucky (consisting of 16 original signed portraits, and 186 original silver nitrate prints), the North Carolina Collection Photographic Archives (consisting of 5 black and white prints focusing on North Carolina), the Center for Creative Photography at the University of Arizona, Tucson, Arizona, and the New York Historical Society (primarily of prominent New Yorkers). As art objects, her photographs are also part of many museum collections including the Smithsonian and the J. Paul Getty Museum.

The Georgia Museum of Art at the University of Georgia organized a major retrospective of her work in 2018 and published the largest book on her work to date. The Library of Congress Prints & Photographs Division holds more than 150 photographic prints by Ulmann.
