= Three Loves =

1932 novel by Scottish author A. J. Cronin

- First edition
- Author: A. J. Cronin
- Language: English
- Genre: Novel
- Published: 1932 Gollancz (UK)
- Publication place: United Kingdom
- Media type: Print (Hardback & Paperback)
- Pages: 591 pp.
- ISBN: 0-450-02202-1

Three Loves is a 1932 novel by Scottish author A. J. Cronin about the loves of Lucy Moore – her husband, her son, and God. Initially published by Gollancz, the story demonstrates how a virtue can become a vice when misguided in seeking rewards other than those in and of itself. The self-satisfied Lucy loves her husband, yet she yearns to improve him so that she can love him even more. To teach him hospitality she invites Cousin Anna, against his protest, to their home. Anna's free and easy behavior soon makes Lucy forget hospitality, and she thinks only of her husband's possible infidelity, which eventually alienates him. When her husband is driven from the house, Anna goes with him, but he is drowned in the ensuing pursuit. Lucy then turns to her son, Peter, and works extremely hard so that he may become a doctor. She accepts no help and refuses to even marry in order to preserve the purity of her motives. Her motherly love is not so pure as she thinks; when Peter marries, her life is ruined once again.

Disappointed in men, Lucy gives all her love to God. As an aged novice in a Belgian monastery, she forces herself to endure disciplinary mortifications for her new love's sake. However, her wearied body cannot stand the strain, and growing sick, she is sent back to England. When her son, through no fault of his own, fails to meet her train, she waits for him on the station platform until she falls. After a brief agony in a hospital, Lucy dies.

== Reception ==
The novel was listed in Publishers Weekly Bestseller list in 1934.
