= John Rathbone Oliver =

American psychiatrist, medical historian, author, and priest (1872–1943)

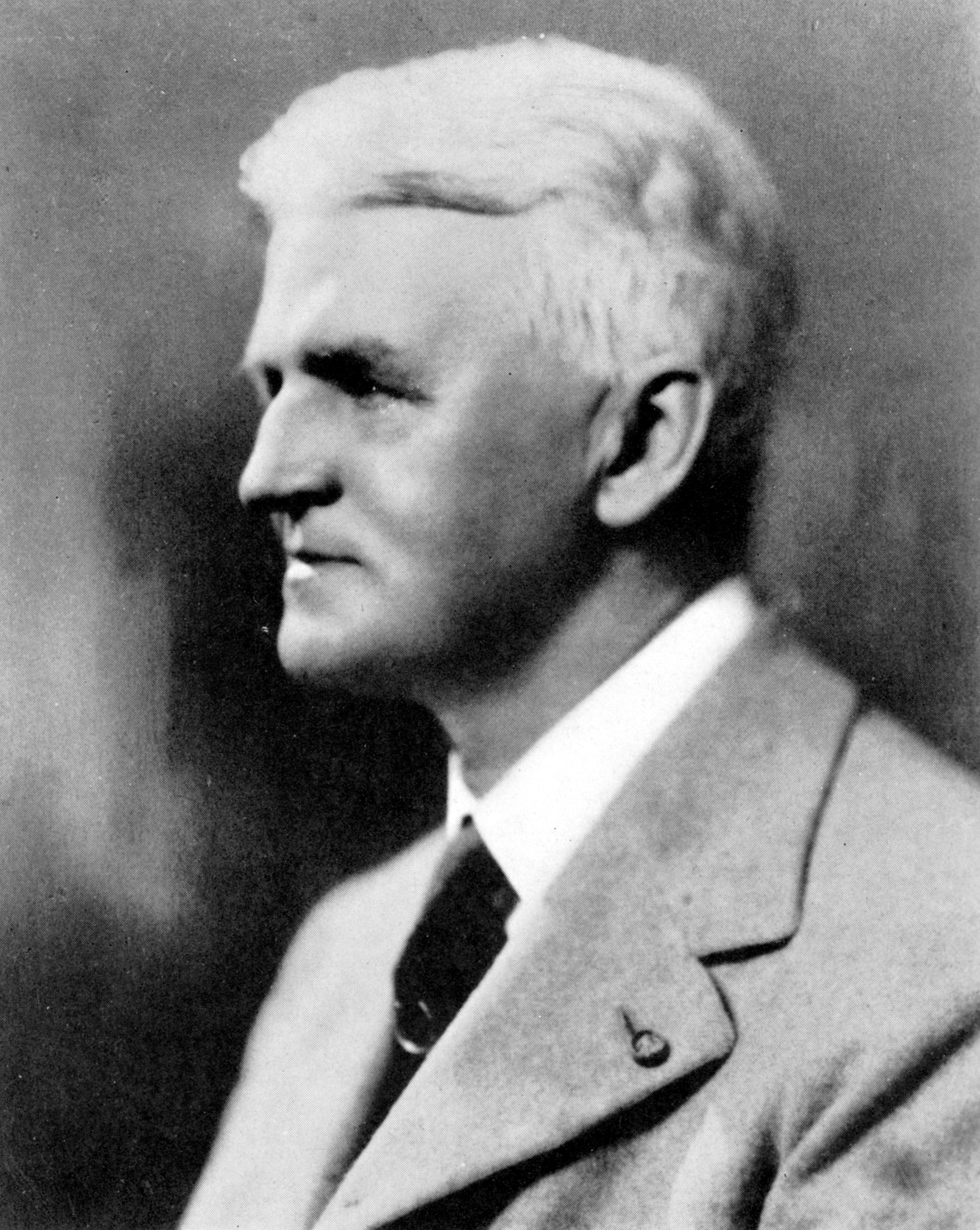
John Rathbone Oliver

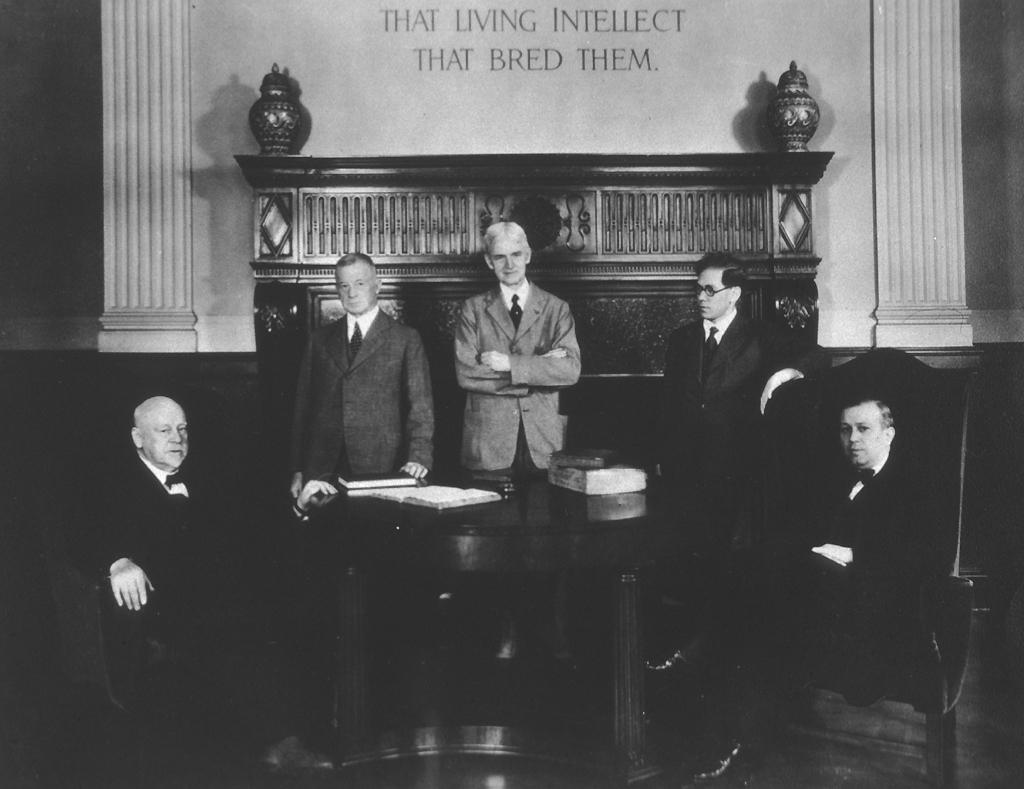
Five Johns Hopkins University staff: L to R, Standing: Fielding H. Garrison, John Rathbone Oliver, and Owsei Temkin; Seated: William Henry Welch and Henry E. Sigerist; Photo ca. 1932.

John Rathbone Oliver (January 4, 1872 – January 21, 1943) was an American psychiatrist, medical historian, author, and priest. His novel Victim and Victor was a contender for the 1929 Pulitzer Prize for Fiction, but the award went to Julia Peterkin's Scarlet Sister Mary.

== Biography ==
Oliver was born in Albany, New York in 1872; his father Robert Shaw Oliver later served as assistant secretary of war. Oliver graduated from Harvard University in 1894 where he served as editor-in-chief of The Harvard Monthly. He taught at St. Paul's School in Concord, New Hampshire from 1894 to 1897. He entered the General Theological Seminary, became a priest in 1900, and served at St. Mark's Church in Philadelphia until 1903. He left the priesthood in 1903, likely due to coming to terms with being gay.

He obtained his M.D. from the University of Innsbruck in 1910, and served in the Austrian Army in 1914-15. Returning to the United States in 1915, he was chief medical officer for the Supreme Bench of Baltimore from 1917 to 1930 and was a psychiatrist at Johns Hopkins University Hospital. He was also a professor of the History of Medicine at the University of Maryland and an associate professor at Johns Hopkins (where he received a Ph.D. in 1927) from 1930 to 1939. He returned to the priesthood in 1927.

After retiring in 1940 in poor health, Oliver died in Waverley, Massachusetts at the age of 71 on January 21, 1941, survived by two sisters.

== Writings ==
Oliver wrote several novels, and a number of non-fiction works on psychiatry and criminology.

In 1929, Oliver's novel Victim and Victor was the first place choice of the jury committee to receive the Pulitzer Prize for Fiction. The jury's chair Richard Burton already spoken favorably of the book in public, and premature press reports thought it had won. However, the Pulitzer committee rejected the recommendation in favor of Julia Peterkin's Scarlet Sister Mary, and Burton declined reappointment to the jury in the future. The novel is a fictionalized account of his leaving the priesthood and his attempts to return.

== Works by John Rathbone Oliver ==
- The Good Shepherd (1913) (under pseudonym John Roland)
- The Adventures of Cigarette (1915) (as John Roland)
- The Six Pointed Cross in the Dust (1915) (as John Roland)
- Fear--The Autobiography of James Edwards (fiction) (1927)
- Victim and Victor (1928)
- Foursquare: The Story of a Fourfold Life (autobiography) (1929)
- Rock and Sand (1930) (novel)
- Article 32 (1931) (novel)
- Psychiatry and Mental Health (1932) (non-fiction)
- Priest or Pagan (1933) (fiction)
- The Ordinary Difficulties of Everyday People (1935)
- Greater Love (1936) (fiction)
