= The Forest and the Fort =

1943 historical novel by Hervey Allen

- Front cover
- Author: Hervey Allen
- Language: English
- Publisher: Farrar & Rinehart
- Publication date: 1943
- Publication place: United States
- Media type: Print (hardback)
- Pages: 344
- OCLC: 9283754
- Preceded by: Action at Acquila
- Followed by: Bedford Village

The Forest and the Fort is a historical novel by the American writer Hervey Allen based upon the Siege of Fort Pitt in 1763. The book was a New York Times bestseller in 1943.

Set in colonial Pittsburgh, Pennsylvania, it is the story of Salatheil Albine, who was captured by Native Americans as a child and raised by them, and who manages to get back there. In addition to the Siege of Fort Pitt, the plot involves the march to Bedford Village after the siege was raised.

The Forest and the Fort is Book One of a planned North American historical romance called Sylvania. The other two novels of this sequence are Bedford Village and Toward the Morning.
