= Scarlet Sister Mary =

1928 novel by Julia Peterkin

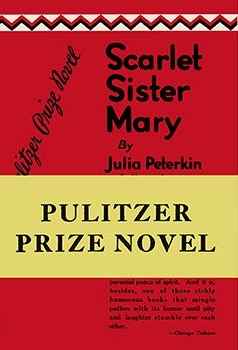
- First Edition
- Author: Julia Peterkin
- Published: 1928

Scarlet Sister Mary is a 1928 novel by Julia Peterkin. It won the Pulitzer Prize for the Novel in 1929. The book was called obscene and banned at the public library in Gaffney, South Carolina. The Gaffney Ledger newspaper, however, serially published the complete book. Dr. Richard S. Burton, the chairperson of Pulitzer's fiction-literature jury, recommended that the first prize go to the novel Victim and Victor by John Rathbone Oliver. His nomination was superseded by the School of Journalism's choice of Peterkin's book. Evidently in protest, Burton resigned from the jury.

Ethel Barrymore had the dramatic rights to the novel, and in 1930 starred on Broadway in a blackface performance, whose cast included Estelle Winwood, Ted de Corsia, Marjorie Main and Barrymore's teenaged daughter, Ethel Barrymore Colt, in her stage debut.

== Synopsis ==
Scarlet Sister Mary is set among the Gullah people of the Low Country in South Carolina. The date never is established, but it appears to be around the beginning of the 20th century. The title character, Mary, was an orphan on an abandoned plantation and was raised by Auntie Maum Hannah and her crippled son Budda Ben. The description of Mary as "Scarlet Sister" reflects the basic conflict in the novel as Mary is torn between her desire to be a member in good standing in the church and a desire to live a life of sin and pleasure.
