= Exile (Deeping novel) =

1930 novel by Warwick Deeping

- Early Grosset & Dunlap reprint
- Author: Warwick Deeping
- Language: English
- Publisher: New York: Alfred A. Knopf; London: Cassell (as Exiles); Toronto: The Ryerson Press
- Publication date: 1930
- Media type: Print (hardcover)
- Pages: 330 pp (US) / 347 pp (UK)

Exile (titled Exiles in the U.K. edition) is a 1930 best-selling novel by English writer Warwick Deeping. According to Publishers Weekly it was the second best-selling novel in the United States in 1930.

The story revolves around a group of English expatriates who have gone to the Italian Riviera.
