= Hervey Allen Study =

Historic house in Florida, United States

- U.S. National Register of Historic Places
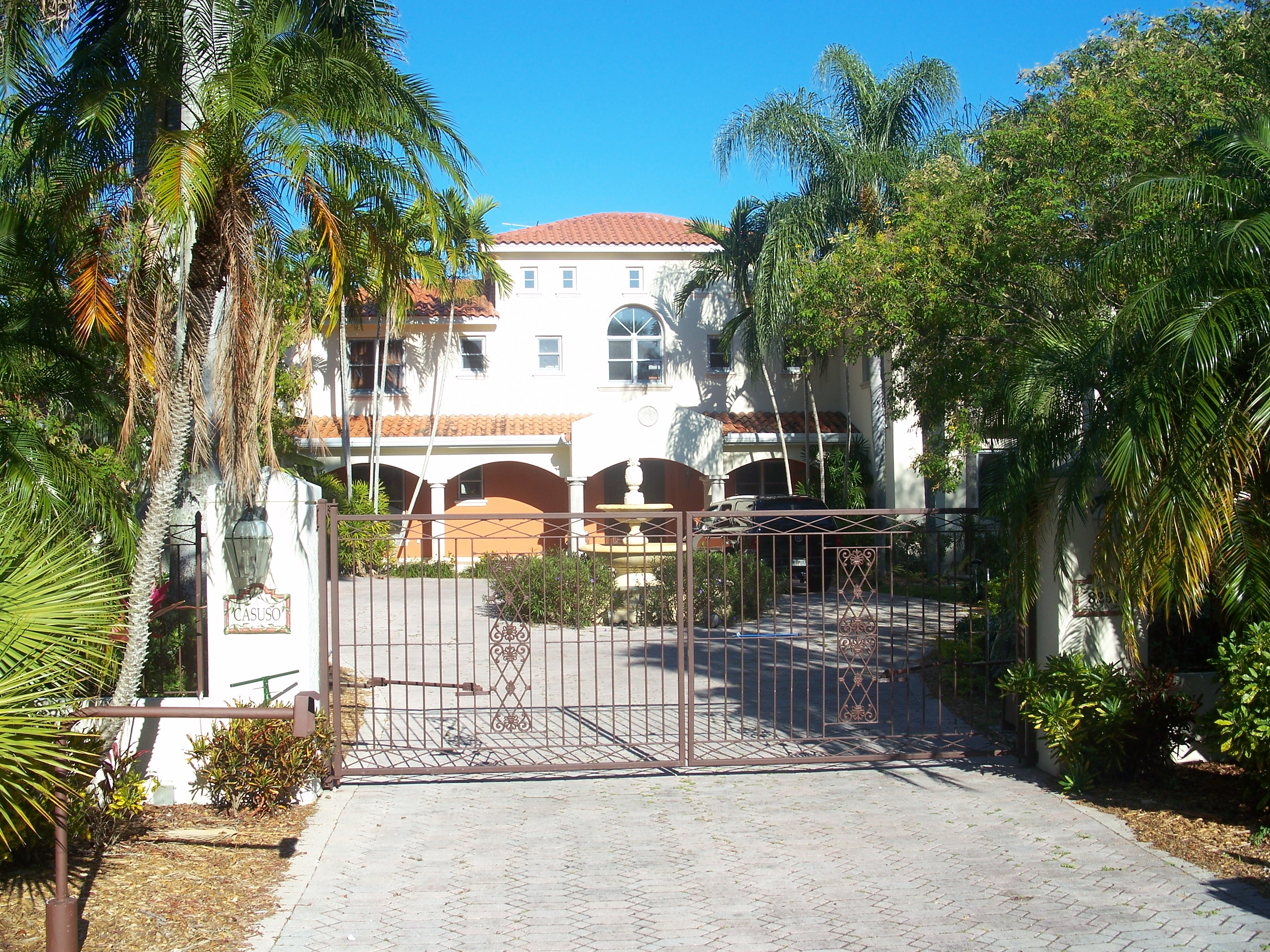

- Location within Miami Location within Florida Location within the United States
- Location: South Miami, Florida
- Coordinates: 25°41′43.0368″N 80°16′35.403″W
- NRHP reference No.: 74002256
- Added to NRHP: May 7, 1974

The Hervey Allen Study (also known as the Glade Estates) is a historic site in South Miami, Florida. It is located at 8251 Southwest 52nd Avenue. On May 7, 1974, it was added to the U.S. National Register of Historic Places. It was the home of novelist Hervey Allen.
