= As the Earth Turns (1934 film) =

1934 film

- Theatrical release poster
- Directed by: Alfred E. Green
- Screenplay by: Ernest Pascal
- Based on: As the Earth Turns; 1933 novel by Gladys Hasty Carroll
- Starring: Jean Muir; Donald Woods; Arthur Hohl
- Cinematography: Byron Haskin
- Edited by: Herbert I. Leeds
- Music by: Heinz Roemheld
- Production company: Warner Bros. Pictures
- Distributed by: Warner Bros. Pictures
- Release date: February 14, 1934
- Running time: 73 minutes
- Country: United States
- Language: English

As the Earth Turns is a 1934 American pre-Code drama film directed by Alfred E. Green and starring Jean Muir and Donald Woods, based on a Pulitzer Prize-nominated best-selling novel by Gladys Hasty Carroll.

== Plot ==
The episodic plot, involving three farm families and marked by the seasons within a little over one year, takes place in rural southern Maine. The main character, Jen Shaw, is a young woman who has primary responsibility for her family while her father Mark deals with the hardships of farming. Despite such hardships and the complaints of her step-sister Margaret and step-mother Cora, who dream of returning to city life, Jen seems largely satisfied with her life. In contrast, Mill, the wife of Jen's unambitious uncle George, is increasingly embittered by her unhappy marriage.

In the winter, a Polish immigrant family, the Jankowskis, arrive to take possession of a nearby farm, making a home in the barn. Stan, the family's eldest son, has given up a promising future as a musician to live in the country. When the Jankowskis have a chance to move back to a city, Stan stays behind to continue farming. He and Jen are attracted to each other, but she is reluctant to accept love and winds up rejecting his offer of marriage.

After a fire destroys Stan's barn, he returns to the city to make a living as a musician and agrees to take Doris with him. Resigned to a life of loneliness, Jen continues to care for her family, but at last Stan returns and the two embrace.

== Cast ==
- Jean Muir as Jen
- Donald Woods as Stan
- Russell Hardie as Ed
- Emily Lowry as Margaret
- Arthur Hohl as George
- Dorothy Peterson as Mil
- David Landau as Mark
- Clara Blandick as Cora
- William Janney as Ollie
- Dorothy Appleby as Doris
- Sarah Padden as Mrs. Janowski
- Egon Brecker as Mr. Janowski
- David Durand as Manuel
- Wally Albright as John
- Georgie Billings as Junior

== Reception ==
The film was considered a box office disappointment for Warner Bros, though it did receive some positive reviews. In Vanity Fair, Helen Brown Norden commented, "There is a certain serious fidelity about the picture which makes it ring true. For almost the first time, you see a group of actors pretending to be farmers, and they actually manage to make it seem credible. You feel they know how to pitch hay and how to churn butter. Perhaps that should count for something."

The reviewer for the New York Sun was respectful and complimentary: "This studio [warner Brothers], more used to the quick tempo and hard rhythms of melodrama, has done a simple, honest job of work with the...new film. It is, especially for city dwellers hungry for a taste of the real country in the spring of the year, a picture to be seen and enjoyed. All the qualities of Mrs. Carroll's novel are in the picture."
