= Gladys Hasty Carroll =

American novelist

Gladys Hasty Carroll (June 26, 1904 – April 1, 1999) was an American novelist active from the late 1920s into the 1980s. In her fiction and non-fiction, Carroll wrote about what she knew and people that she loved, especially those in the Southern Maine rural community of Dunnybrook, located in South Berwick, Maine. Carroll believed that the history of common folk mattered most and her works presented their stories.

Carroll's debut novel As the Earth Turns featured one year on a local family farm. In 1933 it was a blockbuster—released by Macmillan on May 2 with advanced sales of 20,000 and as the Book-of-the-Month Club selection for May. In 1996 it was "read and discussed by informal study groups and in classrooms throughout the state" as part of a Maine Humanities Council project on "the impact of modernism on Maine".

== Life ==
Carroll was born June 26, 1904, in Rochester, New Hampshire. She grew up on her family's South Berwick farm, where she lived with her parents, Warren Verd Hasty and Emma Frances Dow, brother Harold, grandfather George Bradford Hasty, and a paternal aunt named Vinnie.

As a child young Gladys Hasty attended a one-room school house. To keep her occupied after she finished assignments, teachers told her to write on any topic she wished. She graduated from Berwick Academy and then matriculated to Bates College, the first person in her family to pursue higher education. Bates friends nicknamed her "Sunny" because of her optimistic personality.

On the day following her graduation in 1925, she married Herbert Allen Carroll in the Bates College chapel. The marriage lasted 58 years, until his death in April 1983. Herbert Carroll's career and pursuits of various degrees took the couple all over America including Massachusetts, Chicago, Minneapolis and Manhattan. They had two children, a son Warren Carroll born in 1932 and a daughter, Sarah, in 1942. (Warren graduated from Bates College in 1953 and died in July 2011; Sarah graduated from Bates College in 1962 and died in August 2011.)

This period marked Carroll's emergence into international prominence as an author. She worked tirelessly, writing short stories, regular advice columns and her novels Cockatoo (1929) and Landspell (1930). In 1933 she wrote her Pulitzer Prize-nominated work of fiction, As the Earth Turns. It was a blockbuster success and the second best selling novel of 1933 according to Publishers Weekly, second only to Hervey Allen's Anthony Adverse and outselling such well-remembered books as Lloyd C. Douglas's Magnificent Obsession and Sinclair Lewis's Ann Vickers. A 1934 film version of the novel starring Jean Muir and Donald Woods from Warner Bros. was a flop, however, and none of Carroll's other novels were ever filmed. The only other film adaption of any of her work was her story "Kristi," which was made into an episode of Jane Wyman's 1950s anthology television series Fireside Theatre.

The money from As the Earth Turns, along with her husband's job at the University of New Hampshire, allowed her to return to her hometown and build a home on the land of her family in South Berwick. She continued to publish novels and also worked to write the folkplay adaptation of As the Earth Turns. She helped produce the play each summer, using her neighbors in the Dunnybrook community and performing it in an open field. Towards the end of this interval, she wrote what some consider to be her greatest work, Dunnybrook, published in 1943.

The folkplay was last performed in 1942, due to World War II. After the war Carroll continued to write, publishing a book every two years in the 1940s and 1950s and seven books in the 1960s. She was elected to the board of trustees of Bates College and traveled extensively for its alumni association. She eventually moved into the Hasty farmhouse and lived a simple life there. In the 1970s she published the novels Next of Kin and Unless You Die Young and the autobiographical Years Away from Home.

In 1985, Carroll inspired the creation of the Dunnybrook Historical Foundation Inc, and was an original trustee. During summers she allowed visitors to come to her Maine home to visit, go on guided tours of Dunnybrook, and get books signed. Family and community members also displayed art, made music and performed historical skits. In the mid-1990s the Old Berwick Historical Society helped produce a professional audio recording of her book Dunnybrook. As Carroll was in her nineties at this point, it took supreme efforts on her part and could be considered the culminating event of a long career.

Gladys Hasty Carroll died peacefully at age 94 on April 1, 1999, in a hospital in York, Maine.

== Dunnybrook Historical Foundation ==
The Dunnybrook Historical Foundation was dedicated to preserving and sharing an extensive collection (some 8000 items) of material related to the history of Dunnybrook as well as the life and works of Gladys Hasty Carroll. The collection included many photographs, diaries, letters, and official records of those families who lived in Dunnybrook. The Foundation, which consisted entirely of direct descendants of Carroll down to her great-grandchildren, worked to preserve the stories of the people whom Carroll thought most important, and it once had a website which offered Carroll books for sale, but it let its 501(c)3 non-profit status lapse in 2012. However, in October 2016, the Chase-Jellison Homestead—a small group of people located in Dunnybrook and consisting primarily of Dunnybrook descendants—agreed to accept the Carroll collection, has reinstated the Foundation's 501(c)3 status with the state of Maine, and is working toward federal reinstatement. Once this happens, the Foundation should again be able to accept donations and, once funded, plans to re-establish a presence on the web along with an education program.

== Books ==
- Cockatoo (Macmillan, 1929), unpaged picture book illustrated by Robert Crowther, LCCN 29-16434
- Land Spell (Macmillan, 1930), illus. William Siegel, for children
- As the Earth Turns (Macmillan, 1933) – "one year in the life of a Maine farm family", OCLC 5343887
- A Few Foolish Ones (Macmillan, 1935)
- Neighbor to the Sky (Macmillan, 1937)
- Head of the Line (Macmillan, 1942), collection
- Dunnybrook (Macmillan, 1943) – "a social history of 10 generations of farmers in her community"
- While the Angels Sing (Macmillan, 1947)
- West of the Hill (Macmillan, 1949)
- Christmas Without Johnny (Macmillan, 1950)
- One White Star (Macmillan, 1954)
- Sing Out the Glory (Little, Brown, 1957)
- Come with Me Home (Little, Brown, 1960)
- Only Fifty Years Ago (Little, Brown, 1962) – autobiographical, featuring year 1909 on the Hasty family farm in Maine, OCLC 1373110
- To Remember Forever: the Journal of a College Girl, 1922–1923 (Little, Brown, 1963) – autobiographical, featuring Bates College forty years ago
- The Road Grows Strange (Little, Brown, 1965)
- The Light Here Kindled (Little, Brown, 1967)
- Christmas Through the Years (Little, Brown, 1968), collection
- Man on the Mountain (Little, Brown, 1969)
- Years Away from Home (Little, Brown, 1972), memoir and correspondence
- Next of Kin (Little, Brown, 1974)
- Unless You Die Young (W. W. Norton, 1977)
- The Book That Came Alive (Portland: G. Gannett Publ., 1979), OCLC 6087014
- The Wings of Berwick Academy: Over the township of South Berwick and its neighbors (Late 1800s and early 1900s) (South Berwick: Dunnybrook Historical Foundation, 1992), OCLC 26223853
