= The Woman of Andros =

1930 novel by Thornton Wilder

- First edition cover
- Author: Thornton Wilder
- Language: English
- Publisher: Albert & Charles Boni
- Publication date: February 1930
- Publication place: United States
- Media type: Hardcover
- Pages: 162

The Woman of Andros is a 1930 novel by Thornton Wilder. Inspired by Andria, a comedy by Terence, it was the third-best selling book in the United States in 1930.

The novel is set on the fictional Greek island of Brynos in the pre-Christian era, probably around 200 B.C. (i.e., in the decline of Greece's golden age though the novel does not give an explicit date) The book examines conflicts between Christian and pre-Christian morality.

Though some reviews considered the novel a masterpiece, others were more critical. This was the first time that Wilder's work received any significant negative critical response. Mike Gold's review in The New Republic faulted Wilder for not addressing modern social issues.
