= August C. Krey =

August Charles Krey (June 29, 1887 – July 28, 1961) was an American medievalist and educator. Krey specialized in the Crusades and produced several works on medieval history, including The First Crusade: The Accounts of Eye-Witnesses and Participants (1921). He was also active in the development of social studies education in the United States, chairing the American Historical Association's Commission on the Social Studies in the Schools from 1929 to 1934.

== Early life and education ==
Born in Germany on June 29, 1887, Krey emigrated to Wisconsin with his family as a child. He earned his bachelor's, master's, and doctoral degrees from the University of Wisconsin—Madison between 1907 and 1914. Krey studied under historians Frederick Jackson Turner, Dana Carleton Munro, and George Clarke Sellery. Under Munro's influence, Krey developed an interest in the Crusades. In addition to his studies, he taught high school in Milwaukee, Wisconsin during this time.

== Career ==
Krey taught at the University of Texas at Austin in 1910 and at the University of Illinois at Urbana-Champaign in 1912. Krey maintained an interest in pedagogy throughout his career, publishing Suggestions for the Teaching of History and Civics in the High School in 1911. In 1912, he co-authored Parallel Source Problems in Medieval History, a text designed to teach students how to analyze primary source documents from the Middle Ages.

In 1913, he joined the University of Minnesota, where he spent the rest of his career. In 1917 and 1918, he co-edited two pamphlets on German War Practices published by the Committee on Public Information. The pamphlets were part of the Committee's campaign to build domestic support for American participation in World War I. During his academic career, he wrote, translated, and edited several books and articles on the Middle Ages with an emphasis on the Crusades.

Krey later took a leading role in developing recommendations for the teaching of history and social studies in American schools. He chaired the American Historical Association's Committee on History in the Schools from 1925 to 1929 and its Commission on the Social Studies in the Schools from 1929 to 1934. As chairman of the commission, Krey headed a five-year effort to develop national recommendations for secondary-school social studies. The final report was a statement of educational values rather than a recommended curriculum. Scholars later argued that the report had little effect on how social studies was taught. In 1938, Krey published A Regional Program for the Social Studies that recommended a social studies curriculum specifically for an agricultural region in Minnesota.

== Personal life ==
In 1912, Krey married Laura Letitia Smith, later known as novelist Laura Krey. After Krey joined the University of Minnesota faculty, the couple settled in St. Paul, Minnesota. They had two children. Following Krey's retirement in 1955, the couple moved to Austin, Texas. Krey died in Houston, Texas, on July 28, 1961.

== Selected works ==
- 1911, Krey, August C. Suggestions for the Teaching of History and Civics in the High School. University of Texas, Bulletin of the University of Texas, no. 201, General Series 22.
- 1912, Duncalf, Frederic, and August C. Krey. Parallel Source Problems in Medieval History. New York and London: Harper & Brothers. xii, 249 pp.
- 1917, Munro, Dana C., George C. Sellery, and August C. Krey, eds. German War Practices. Part I: Treatment of Civilians. Washington, D.C.: Committee on Public Information.
- 1918, Munro, Dana C., George C. Sellery, and August C. Krey, eds. German War Practices. Part II: German treatment of conquered territory. Washington, D.C.: Committee on Public Information.
- 1921, Krey, August C. The First Crusade: The Accounts of Eye-Witnesses and Participants. Princeton, N.J.: Princeton University Press; London: Humphrey Milford, Oxford University Press. viii, 299 pp.
- 1934, American Historical Association, Commission on the Social Studies in the Schools. Conclusions and Recommendations of the Commission. August C. Krey, chairman. New York: Charles Scribner's Sons.
- 1935, Munro, Dana Carleton. August C. Krey, ed. The Kingdom of the Crusaders. New York and London: D. Appleton-Century Company.
- 1938, Krey, August C. A Regional Program for the Social Studies. New York: The Macmillan Company. xiii, 140 pp.
- 1943, William of Tyre. A History of Deeds Done Beyond the Sea. Translated and annotated by Emily Atwater Babcock and August C. Krey. 2 vols. New York: Columbia University Press, 1943. Records of Civilization: Sources and Studies, no. 35.
- 1955, Krey, August C. History and the Social Web: A Collection of Essays. Minneapolis: University of Minnesota Press. 269 pp.
