= Appalachian folk art =

Regional form of American folk art

Artist interpretation of a flag for Appalachia and Appalachian Americans

Appalachian folk art is a regional form of folk art based in the Appalachian region of the United States. American folk art collector and writer Chuck Rosenak stated about its contemporary form that "the definition of folk art is obscure". Folk art is a way to convey the feelings and mannerisms of cultures through handmade visual art and communicates a message to the observer. Though folk art itself was brought to the Americas by Europeans, it has adapted to each region and has cultivated traditions in each of them.

The Appalachian region, located in the northeast region of the United States, includes parts the following 13 states: Alabama, Georgia, Kentucky, Maryland, Mississippi, New York, North Carolina, Ohio, Pennsylvania, South Carolina, Tennessee, Virginia and West Virginia. The region includes mountain ranges, plateaus, and plains as well as American Indian tribal communities that have inspired Appalachian folk art and founded numerous techniques to create such art. There is a variety of methods to express Appalachian folk art that can be seen in the different textiles and forms of art such as basketry, pottery, and woodcarving.

== History ==
Cultural definitions of Appalachia: (Note: Counties were compared across ten maps of cultural Appalachia. If a county appears in all ten definitions, it is marked "Always included", if it appears in at least six, it is marked "Usually included", if it appears in at least two, it is marked "Sometimes included", and if it appears in only one, it is marked "Rarely included". The ten maps used are cultural definitions from the Mapping Appalachia interactive map viewer: 1896 Berea by William G. Frost and C. Willard Hayes; 1918 Berea Catalog; 1921 Campbell Region; 1935 USDA Small Region; 1935 USDA Full Region; 1962 Ford Region; 1994 Salstrom; 1996 Consensus Appalachia from Williams; 1996 Loose Appalachia from Williams; 2002 Core Appalachia from Williams) Always included in Appalachia Usually included Sometimes included Rarely included Physically contains the Appalachian Mountains or associated features; not culturally Appalachian The blue dotted line encloses the counties included in the ARC definition.

Appalachian folk art includes the influence of the Native Americans who arrived in the Appalachian region about 16,000 years ago. The colonization of the United States brought Europeans to the region in the 17th century. Many Indian tribes were pushed out of the land, but some continued to reside in the Appalachian region, furthering their effect on the culture and art through their fondness for wildlife. The European influence complements the natural aesthetic of the Native Americans by means of the folklore traditions they brought from their homeland.

Arriving in a land inhabited by Native American tribes, early Europeans began to use the environment to help them assimilate to the area. Native Americans and Europeans introduced Appalachian folk art through daily activities and items such as weaving to make clothes and quilts or pottery to construct bowls and other everyday items. The customs continued as the generations passed but the practices used for blacksmithing, weaving, and woodcarving no longer were necessities but rather they became art and began to be preserved.

Groups such as "hillbillies", who were immigrants from Scotland, Ireland, and Germany, created a stereotype for Appalachian society in that they were thought to consist of white people who are independent yet selfish and intense. The influence of hillbillies and rednecks affected art due to the prejudice of the stereotype and the art found a purpose in defending the Appalachian culture from the categorization.

Modern problems in the economy began to affect the art created in the region as artists participated in movements and created art as a way to express their beliefs on social and political debates. The region was impoverished and isolated from the country which also contributed to the necessity of understanding nature for survival reasons. The knowledge of plants and animals also attributed to the focus of nature in the Appalachian folk art. The modern movement of preserving art has led to the creation of museums, such as The Museum of Appalachia, which has led to a greater understanding and appreciation of Appalachian folk art.

== Characteristics ==
=== Textiles ===
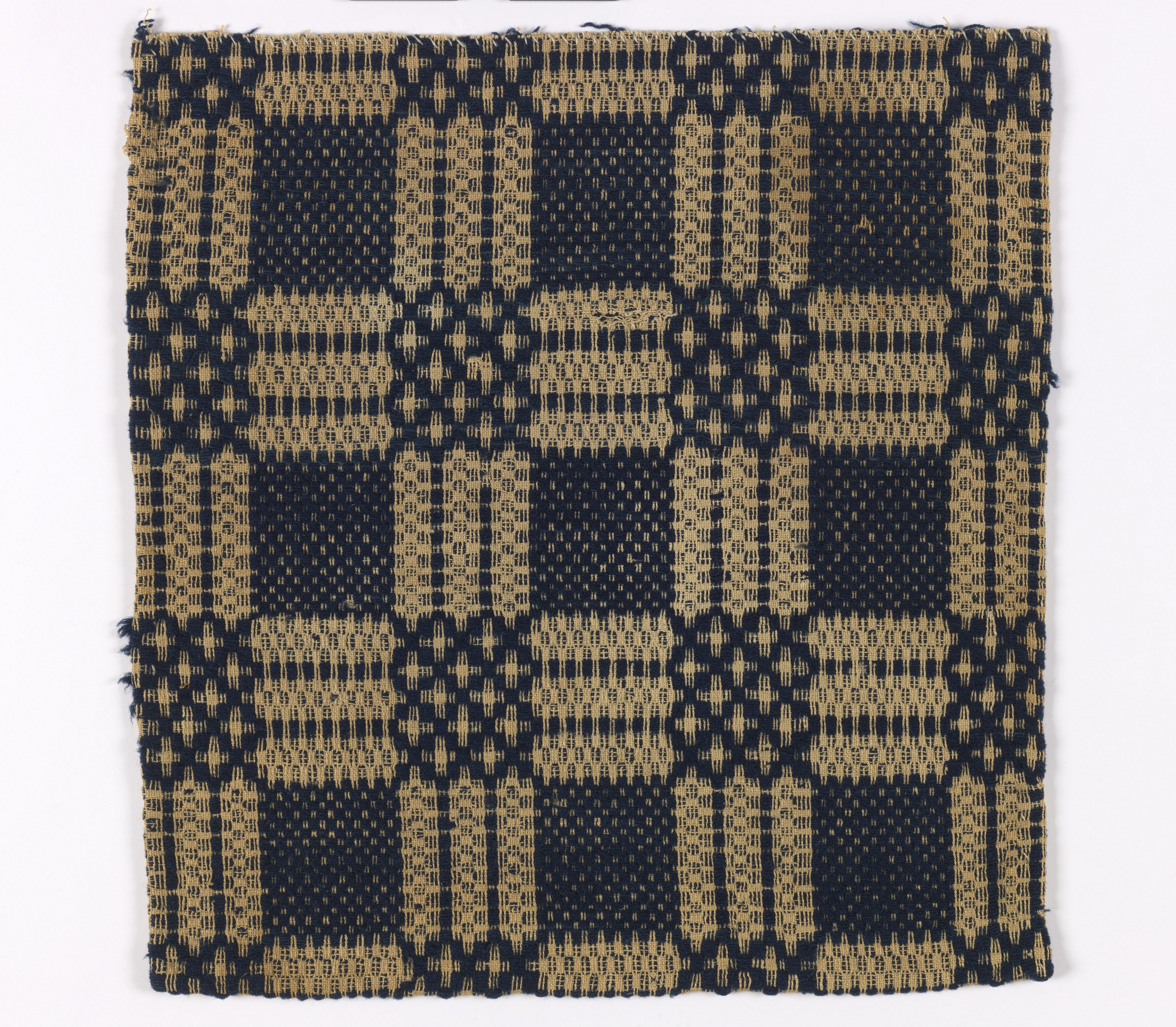
Fragment of a woven coverlet

Appalachian women have a legacy of creating art through the weaving of mountain coverlets, which have gained appreciation as an important American art form. Appalachian handweavers also created fabrics used to make various household items on family looms. Coverlet weaving was a work of aesthetic value that took considerable talent and energy to achieve and most clearly expressed the weaver's creativity and personality.

Appalachian women used affordable and easily attainable raw materials, such as home-grown wool and flax or cotton purchased by the bale, to create their art. They colored their hand spun fibers with natural plant matter or purchased packaged dyes and also used bits of their home-woven fabric to piece quilts. Despite the availability of cheaper and easier bed coverings, artistic weavers in Southern Appalachia chose to continue following the handcraft traditions of their foremothers.

The early decorative arts of Appalachia were the result of self-reliance and making do with materials at hand. The preservation and marketing of traditional crafts began in the early 20th century, with settlement schools and missionary workers seeing crafts as a means of generating cash income.

The seclusion of the Appalachian region provided an environment for the development of distinctive cultural practices, one of which is their own form of quilting. This type of quilting is a fusion of various folk traditions from Scottish, Irish, and German cultures, with local influences from Native American, Amish, and Quaker communities.

=== Basketry ===
Tennessee basketry is an ancient art that was invented by people in all parts of the world. Native Americans in Tennessee used baskets made of locally available river cane and white oak for a variety of needs, such as carrying water, cooking, sifting corn meal, and weaving footwear and hats. As white explorers moved into the area, they found that Native Americans substituted baskets for many articles that Europeans made of metal or wood. The Cherokee, Choctaw, Creek, and Chickasaw tribes used vegetable dyes made from roots, bark, leaves, hulls, flowers, fruits, stems, seeds, or the complete plant to color their baskets. White settlers in the mountains of East Tennessee brought basketry techniques and traditions learned in England, Scotland, and Ireland, and adapted them to local Tennessee materials such as oak, hickory, birch, pine needles, willow, corn husks, and river cane.

Many basket weavers learned the craft by watching their mothers and from gathering materials. They made use of patterns and designs that were a continuation of cultural legacy. The baskets are often oval or vase-shaped, sometimes with lids or handles. Ethnographers identified and named nearly two dozen basket patterns traditionally woven by the Eastern Band of Cherokee, many of which are dyed with plants to create color contrast. Basket making plays an important role in Cherokee's economy, but increased tourism and land development has made it more difficult to find basket making materials in the wild.

Slat and ribbed baskets were the two prominent types used by the early Tennessee settlers. Slat baskets were made from white oak strips, while ribbed baskets were constructed of ribs, hoops, and splits. The traditional egg basket, or gizzard basket, was the prominent form produced by the ribbed basket technique. West Tennessee cotton and work baskets were hamper-shaped with two handles and rough-cut splits made of hickory, ash, and birch. Tobacco baskets were flat-slat tray-like forms used to transport cut tobacco from field to curing barn and then to market.

Although nails were incorporated during the Industrial Revolution of the nineteenth century, Tennessee basketmaking has largely remained unchanged into the twentieth century. Today, baskets of all forms and materials can be found at a variety of craft fairs and retail craft stores throughout Tennessee, and the techniques for basketmaking remain virtually the same as those of the past.

=== Pottery ===
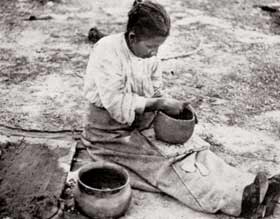
Catawba potter

The Catawba Nation has the longest pottery-making tradition in North America and influenced Cherokee pottery making. Women were traditionally the potters in both Catawba and Cherokee cultures. Cherokee pottery was made using a coil building method, imprinted with designs using carved wooden paddles, and polished using stones. Correct clay preparation, construction, and polishing are necessary for the pottery not to crack or be rough-sanded. Cherokee pottery is unglazed, fired in pits using native woods, and waterproofed using corncobs and bran.

=== Woodcarving ===
Woodcarving in Appalachia is both a practical skill and an art form. Wood was the primary material used for making tools, utensils, and toys on self-sufficient farms. Carvers began to embellish their creations with decorations and sell them as folk art. Human figures, religious themes, and animals are common subjects for Appalachian carvers. Snakes, horses, and hound dogs are especially popular. Woodcarving can be done for practical purposes or purely for enjoyment.

=== Painting ===
Appalachian painting refers to a diverse range of decorative painting styles that originated in the Appalachian region of the United States. These styles encompass techniques, motifs, and materials drawn from a variety of cultural influences, including Native American, African American, and European traditions. From the late 18th century to the New Deal era, both itinerant and local artists employed common and inexpensive techniques of graining and marbling to imitate rare and costly woods and marbles, as well as painted landscapes and other motifs as focal points in private and public interiors. The decorative paintings have survived in many historic examples across the state of Tennessee and in other Appalachian areas. The region's natural beauty, rural life, and cultural heritage have also inspired mural paintings created through President Franklin D. Roosevelt's New Deal art programs of the 1930s and 1940s, which aimed to support the visual arts and provide employment for artists during the Great Depression. One prominent modern Appalachian folk painter is Mike Ousley, whose work draws on stories and folklore he has heard and experienced throughout his life in eastern Kentucky.

== Major artists ==
=== Clay Burnette ===
Clay Burnette is a celebrated artist who creates coiled baskets using local pine needles. His work has been exhibited in over 250 events, won multiple awards, and has been featured in various exhibitions and publications. His baskets are infused with a preservative mixture and signed with his initials.

=== Nellie Mae Rowe ===
Nellie Mae Rowe was a Black self-taught artist born in Georgia in 1900. Despite a life shaped by segregation and oppression, Rowe created a joyful and colorful body of art that transformed her home and yard into a realm she called her "Playhouse." She depicted friends, neighbors, and herself in her artwork, conveying Black beauty and free-spirited joy in a society that rarely featured Black women in works of art. Her art was a way for her to convey gratitude and recover a childhood lost to labor and poverty, and she crafted a world that embodied the richness of life.

=== Bill Traylor ===
Bill Traylor was born into slavery in Alabama in 1853 and remained on the plantation after the Civil War as a laborer. He moved to Montgomery in 1910 and began drawing and painting in 1939, creating scenes that depicted African American culture and history. His art was saved by a group of white artists in Montgomery and gained widespread recognition in the 1980s. Traylor died in poverty in 1949 and was buried in an unmarked grave. Today, he is celebrated as a self-taught artist whose work captures the complexity of African American life in the Jim Crow South.

=== Mose Ernest Tolliver ===
Mose Ernest Tolliver was a celebrated folk artist from Alabama, known for his vibrant and colorful paintings of fruits, vegetables, animals, and people. He worked odd jobs to support his large family before turning to art after a work-related injury. His self-taught style and use of house paint on cardboard, wood, metal, and furniture placed him in the genre of Outsider Art. His work was featured in galleries across the country and his Moose Lady pieces became popular. He died in 2006.

=== Jimmy Lee Sudduth ===
Artist Jimmy Lee Sudduth uses mud mixed with sugar water and natural dyes to create paintings that feature a wide range of subjects, from self-portraits to cityscapes. He paints on plywood using his fingers rather than brushes, and his works often explore the anonymity of city life.

=== Howard Finster ===
Howard Finster was a religious artist who felt a calling to create sacred art in 1976. He built Paradise Garden, an everchanging environmental sculpture made from cast-off pieces of technology, to honor human inventors and create a "Memorial to God."

=== Grandma Moses ===
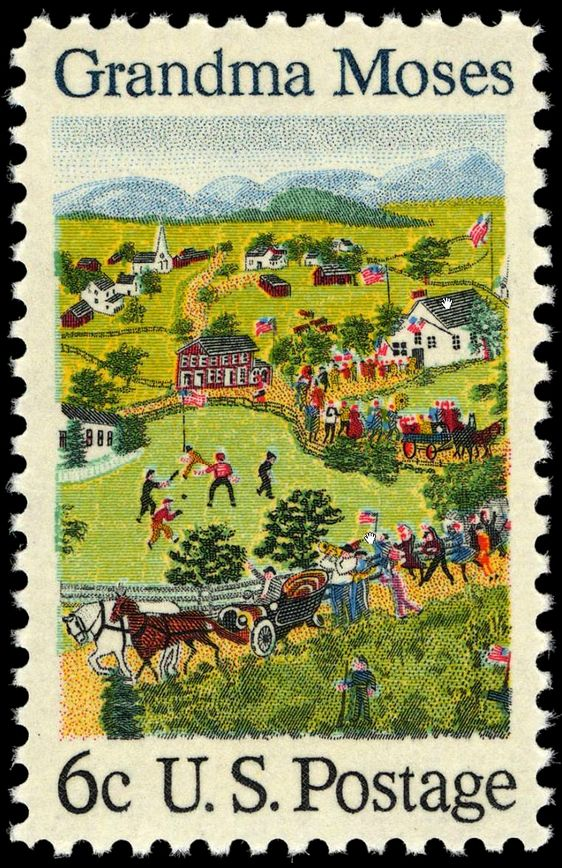
Stamp to honor Grandma Moses

Grandma Moses was a self-taught artist who began painting at the age of 78 due to arthritis. Her paintings depicted happy childhood memories of farm life, intentionally omitting industrialization. Her paintings became immensely popular and were appreciated for their nostalgic charm. She continued painting until a few months before her death at age 101, exhibiting internationally.

=== Cedar Creek Charlie ===
Charlie Fields, also known as "Cedar Creek Charlie," was an eccentric bachelor who lived with his mother on a tobacco farm. After her death, he began decorating and building projects that occupied his spare moments for the rest of his life. Fields decorated his house with various patterns, his favorite being polka dots, and covered everything inside and outside with red, white, and blue. He also built an amusement park-like yard and welcomed visitors, especially children.
