= Solveig Krey =

Norwegian naval officer (born 1963)

Solveig Krey (born 20 March 1963) is a Norwegian navy officer.

She hails from Lonkan, and graduated from the Norwegian Naval Academy in 1989. She became the first female commanding officer of a submarine in the world, when she took command of the first Kobben class submarine, on 11 September 1995. She was also the first female commander of a Royal Norwegian Navy vessel.
