= Vincent Nolte =

German merchant (1779-1856)

- Undated portrait of Nolte
- Born: 21 November 1779; Livorno, Grand Duchy of Tuscany
- Died: 19 August 1856 (aged 76); Paris, France
- Occupation: Merchant
- Spouse: Lisida Fevé (m. 1820)
- Children: 5

Vincent Otto Nolte (21 November 1779 – 19 August 1856) was an German and American merchant. Born in Livorno to a family from Hamburg, he fled the city due to Napoleon's occupation and worked as a merchant and banker in France and Italy. After working in the American city of New Orleans as an agent transferring silver between Mexico and Spain, he ran two cotton businesses in the country; both of them went bankrupt after economic bubble bursts.

== Biography ==
Vincent Otto Nolte was born on 21 November 1779 in Livorno, the eldest child of Anna Katharina (née Matsen) and Johann Heinrich Nolte, the latter of whom was general consul for Hamburg state. His maternal grandfather, Hermann Matsen, served in the Hamburg rath.

Nolte became an apprentice for Livorno-based merchant Otto Frank at age 16; however he showed little interest in him, and they fled the city when it was occupied by Napoleon's forces. Returning to Hamburg, Nolte saw the family fall into bankruptcy after a bubble in the city following rival Amsterdam being caught up in the Batavian Revolution burst. Leaving Germany, he joined Nantes-based A. M. Labouchère & Troteau as a merchant in 1804.

=== Life in New Orleans ===
With Spain seeking to pay off debt to Napoleon during the Anglo-Spanish War, Gabriel-Julien Ouvrard organized the Hope-Baring Operation to obtain silver from Spain's reserves in Mexico. Nolte was thus hired to organize this transfer as an agent in New Orleans. He finally arrived in New Orleans in 1806, and lived there during his work. The operation ended after the Mexican War of Independence, with 700,000 piastres obtained from the Consolidation Fund in Havana. Nolte was shipwrecked off Florida after leaving his job, but survived and made it home.

After a brief stay in Europe, Nolte returned to New Orleans in 1812 to cash in on the state's cotton industry, but a naval blockade caused by the War of 1812 hindered his business opportunities. He clandestinely sold cotton to the British side in Pensacola while joining General Andrew Jackson's militia in the Battle of New Orleans to prevent suspicion of enemy collaboration. He also made a business trip to France, during which he toured the Waterloo Battlefield.

After the war ended, Nolte was able to export cotton, with his trading career extending to coffee, flour, pelts, tobacco. In 1816, he was appointed the Commercial Deputation's consul for New Orleans. He owned several slaves and even traded some for Harman Blennerhassett, though according to Margrit Schulte Beerbühl, was "never a large-scale slave trader". However, he was caught in a bubble surrounding cotton prices, and after it burst he filed for bankruptcy in 1826. He spent some time abroad to settle the remaining debts of his business dealings, including time in a London debtor's prison. In 1829, he left New Orleans for Europe and stood down as consul.

=== Returning to Europe ===
Back in Europe, Nolte co-founded a Marseille bank named Nolte, Kenney & Co., while later closed after its parent company, Irish-French bank Daly & Co., went bankrupt due to the 1830 July Revolution. With the help of his friend the Marquis de Lafayette, he sold used arms to the National Guard during the French conquest of Algeria, but this resulted in tensions from his business associates, and the venture ended after a new minister of war took power and Lafayette died. He was also sentenced to debtors' prison a second time in 1837. After years of failed efforts, he published Memorial of Facts Connected with the History of Medallic Engraving, and the Process of M. Collas (1838).

In 1838, Nolte returned to the United States, where the cotton industry had recovered from the Panic of 1837. He started a cotton venture despite his complete lack of capital, processing 37,000 bales of cotton while banking on a $40 cost per bale. The venture collapsed after the price of cotton collapsed due to a grain shortage in England, and John Randolph Grymes bailed him out from a prison. Newspapers around the world called him an egregious example of cotton speculation.

Following the failure of his American cotton venture, Nolte worked for Trieste-based traders John and James Grant, at one point working as their debt collector in Odessa and later correspondance secretary. His final employer was J. C. Ritter & Co., which he quit after two years due to a "difference of character and mercantile views", turning down a year's salary worth of hush money. He later ran a numismatic company.

Nolte was a trade journalist in Trieste and Augsburg, though he was often hindered by Austro-Hungarian authorities' censorship, and worked as the editor for the newspaper Der Freihafen for eleven issues. In 1853, he published a memoir named Fifty Years in Both Hemispheres, after three years of working on it. He also published an updated volume of William Benecke's System of Assurance and Bottomry.

=== Personal life and death ===
Nolte married Lisida Fevé in 1820, and the couple had five children; all but two of them died in youth. He held American citizenship, though he altered between living in the United States and Europe.

Nolte maintained a close friendship with Benjamin Henry Latrobe, who lived nearby and also built Nolte's French Quarter house. He was known to have associated with several historical contemporaries: not just Lafayette, Jackson (the future U.S. president), and Napoleon, but also John James Audubon and Queen Victoria. He was also a Freemason, joining shortly after arriving in New Orleans.

Nolte died on 19 August 1856 in Paris. In the American National Biography, E. Clark Davis stated that Nolte's "financial career demonstrates both the great opportunities and the enormous risks of early American commerce", and that his autobiography "provides a useful insider’s view of nineteenth-century economics and history".
