= Marie Antoinette: The Portrait of an Average Woman =

Biography of Marie Antoinette by Stefan Zweig

- Viking Press first edition 1933
- Author: Stefan Zweig
- Original title: Marie Antoinette. Bildnis eines mittleren Charakters
- Translator: Eden Paul; Cedar Paul
- Language: German
- Publisher: Insel-Verlag
- Publication date: 1932
- Publication place: Germany
- English publication date: 1933
- Pages: 639

Marie Antoinette: The Portrait of an Average Woman (German: Marie Antoinette. Bildnis eines mittleren Charakters) is a 1932 biography of the French queen Marie Antoinette by Austrian writer Stefan Zweig. Viking Press published the first English-language edition, translated by Eden and Cedar Paul, in 1933.

The book served as the inspiration the 1938 Metro-Goldwyn-Mayer film Marie Antoinette starring Norma Shearer, and the Japanese manga series The Rose of Versailles written and illustrated by Riyoko Ikeda.

== See also ==
- 1932 in literature
- Austrian literature
