= Caroline Pafford Miller =

American writer

- Born: Caroline Pafford; August 26, 1903; Waycross, Georgia, US
- Died: July 12, 1992 (aged 88); Waynesville, North Carolina, US
- Resting place: Green Hill Cemetery
- Occupation: Writer
- Spouses: William Miller; Clyde Ray
- Children: 5
- Writing career
- Genre: Novel
- Notable work: Lamb in His Bosom
- Notable awards: Pulitzer Prize for Fiction, 1934; Prix Femina Americain, 1935

Caroline Pafford Miller (August 26, 1903 – July 12, 1992) was an American novelist. She gathered the folktales, stories, and archaic dialects of the rural communities she visited in her home state of Georgia in the late 1920s and early 1930s, and wove them into her first novel, Lamb in His Bosom, for which she won the Pulitzer Prize for Fiction in 1934, and the French literary award, the Prix Femina Americain in 1935. Her success as the first Georgian winner of the fiction prize inspired Macmillan Publishers to seek out more southern writers, resulting in the discovery of Margaret Mitchell, whose first novel, Gone with the Wind, also won a Pulitzer Prize for Fiction in 1937. Miller's story about the struggles of nineteenth-century south Georgia pioneers found a new readership in 1993 when Lamb in His Bosom was reprinted, one year after her death. In 2007, Miller was inducted into the Georgia Writers Hall of Fame.

== Early years and education ==
Caroline Pafford was born on August 26, 1903, in Waycross, Georgia, to Elias Pafford and Levy Zan (Hall) Pafford. She was the youngest of seven children. Her father was a Methodist minister and schoolteacher, who died while she was in middle school. Her mother died during Caroline's junior year of high school. During the remaining years of school, she was raised by her older sisters.

In her high school years, Caroline expressed an interest in writing and in the performing arts. She never attended college. After graduating from high school she married William D. Miller, who was her English teacher, and moved to Baxley, Georgia, in the late 1920s, where her husband ultimately became superintendent of schools in the Baxley area. William Miller introduced Caroline to classical literature, and she would later say that "he was my college". The couple had three sons, two of whom were twins. During her early years of marriage, while raising her children and performing her domestic duties, Miller wrote short stories, an activity first begun in high school. The stories were well received, and the small amounts she was paid supplemented the family income.

== First novel and Pulitzer Prize ==
Miller gathered much of the material for Lamb in His Bosom while she was buying chickens and eggs tens of miles in the backwoods. She recorded her local research and genealogy in a notebook while she traveled throughout rural south Georgia. Miller gathered folktales and family oral histories, as well as idiomatic expressions which would eventually color the text of her novel. Her initial work was done when "returning to Baxley, she would go to Barnes Drugstore, order a Coca-Cola, and write down the stories she had heard on the day's trip"; then she would slowly flesh out her novel in the quiet hours of the evening on her kitchen table. While stories from the backwoods became part of the fabric of her novel, Miller also drew upon the inspiring tales of the pioneer women in her own family history.

Upon completion of the novel, Miller began looking for a publisher. During this search, she met former Pulitzer Prize winner Julia Peterkin, who read and then forwarded Miller's manuscript for Lamb in His Bosom to her own agent. Harper published the book in 1933.

Lamb in His Bosom is a story about the struggles of poor white pioneers, in the Wiregrass Region of nineteenth-century southern Georgia. Upon publication, literary critics embraced the work, describing it as "regional historical realism". The New York Times' critic Louis Kronenberger said the novel "has a wonderful freshness about it; not simply the freshness of a new writer, but the freshness of a new world. It all seems to have happened far away and long ago, yet Mrs. Miller has caught it roundly here and made it in its small way imperishable". It has been described as "one of the most critically acclaimed first novels of the Southern Renaissance period".

The Pulitzer Prize for Fiction was awarded to her at Columbia University on May 7, 1934. Addressing the audience, Miller said that "she felt like Cinderella and that the success of her book seemed like a fairy tale". Upon her return to Baxley, she was greeted by a crowd of 2,500 and a marching band, which escorted her back to her home. Margaret Mitchell wrote to Miller, saying: "Your book is undoubtedly the greatest that ever came out of the South about Southern people, and it is my favorite book". In 1935, Miller was also honored with a French literary award, the Prix Femina Americain.

Author Finis Farr said that after Miller's novel won the Pulitzer, Macmillan Publishers sent editor Harold S. Latham south, on a scouting trip for more southern authors. He famously found Margaret Mitchell and subsequently published Gone with the Wind.

== Divorce and second marriage ==
The newfound celebrity, that both complimented and burdened the new Pulitzer Prize winner, proved stressful for the rural Georgia school superintendent and his wife. The obligations and attention imposed upon Caroline were incompatible with the quiet, simple, existence that she and William had enjoyed prior to her fame. The Millers divorced in 1936. Caroline remarried one year later to Clyde H. Ray Jr., an antique dealer and florist. She moved with him to the town of Waynesville in North Carolina, where Caroline worked in the family business while continuing to write short stories and articles for newspapers and magazines, such as Pictorial Review and Ladies' Home Journal. They had one daughter and a son.

== Later years ==
In 1944, Miller finished her second novel, Lebanon, which garnered mixed reviews from the critics. Although constructed along the lines of her earlier work, set in rural Georgia, the new novel had a romantic storyline which was criticized as being awkward and unrealistic.

After her second husband died, Miller moved to a remote mountain home. It was described as "so remote that visitors had to drive through a cow pasture taking care to close a maze of gates behind them". In the decades that followed, Miller continued to write, completing several manuscripts. But she never sought to publish them. For the most part, she lived a quiet, private life in her rural western North Carolina home.

== Death and legacy ==
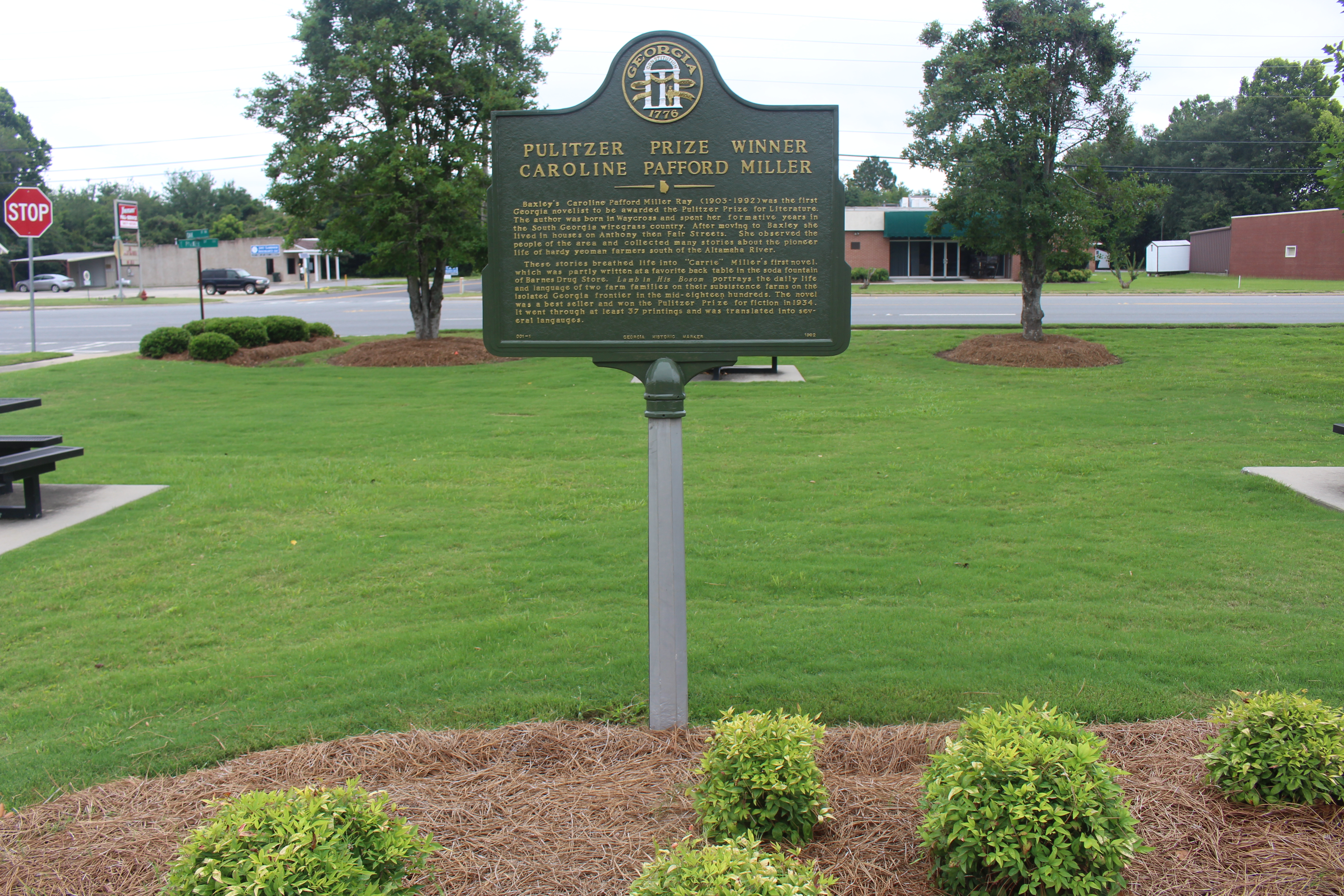
Historical marker in Baxley, Appling County, Georgia

On July 12, 1992, Miller died in Waynesville, North Carolina, at the age of 88. She is buried in Green Hill Cemetery. She was survived by her daughter, and three of her four sons. Her first novel regained popularity a year after her death when Peachtree Publishers (Atlanta) reprinted Lamb in His Bosom with a new afterword from historian Elizabeth Fox-Genovese. By Miller's own definition, she had achieved the greatest award given a novelist: "the knowledge that after he dies he will leave the best part of himself behind".

Miller was honored when named into the Georgia Writers Hall of Fame. In 1991, the city of Baxley honored her with Caroline Miller Day.

== Works ==
- Lamb in His Bosom (Harper & Brothers, 1933)
- Lebanon (Doubleday, Doran and Company, 1944)
