= Laura Krey =

American writer

Laura Letitia Smith Krey
- Born: December 18, 1890; Galveston, Texas, United States
- Died: November 6, 1985 (aged 94); Austin, Texas, United States
- Occupation: novelist
- Spouse: August C. Krey (m. 1912, d. 1961)

Laura Letitia Smith Krey (December 18, 1890 – November 6, 1985), known professionally as Laura Krey, was an American novelist known for historical novels set in Texas. She is best known for her 1938 novel And Tell of Time.

== Early life and education ==
Krey was born in Galveston, Texas, on December 18, 1890. She was the only child of Fort and Lettie (Bains) Smith. Her mother died several months after her birth, after which Krey was sent to live with maternal relatives near Brookshire, Texas. She was educated by tutors until the age of twelve, when she moved to Virginia to live with her grandmother near Staunton. She attended Mary Baldwin Seminary and later enrolled at the University of Texas at Austin in 1909. During her time there, she wrote for campus publications, including the Cactus yearbook and the Daily Texan. She also studied with historian Eugene C. Barker with an emphasis on the history of Texas. She graduated Phi Beta Kappa in 1912.

== Career ==
While raising her children, Krey wrote essays that appeared in Southern literary magazines. Drawing on family stories, she later wrote her first historical novel, And Tell of Time, which was published by Houghton Mifflin in 1938. Set in Brazos County in eastern Texas during the Reconstruction era, the 712-page novel depicts the period from the viewpoint of white Texans opposed to federal Reconstruction policies. The novel sold approximately 146,000 copies and went through fifteen printings.

Krey's second novel, On the Long Tide, was published by Houghton Mifflin in 1940. The novel, set in colonial Texas, concerns conflicts between American settlers and Mexican authorities and is told largely from the perspective of a Texas landowner.

During the 1940s and 1950s, Krey conducted research on the Spanish explorer Álvar Núñez Cabeza de Vaca and on colonial Virginia with the intention of writing additional historical novels, but neither project was completed.

=== Critical reception ===
Contemporary reviewers compared And Tell of Time to Margaret Mitchell's 1936 novel Gone With the Wind. They praised its engaging narrative, depiction of the Texas landscape, and Krey’s knowledge of Texas history, while finding its characters largely conventional. Recurring criticisms involved the author's romanticism of the era and her treatment of African American characters as socially insignificant. Krey's second novel, On the Long Tide, received less critical attention.

== Personal life ==
In 1912, Krey married historian August C. Krey. After he joined the faculty of the University of Minnesota, the couple settled in St. Paul, Minnesota. They had two children, a daughter born in 1918 and a son born in 1923. Following her husband's retirement in 1955, the couple moved back to Austin, Texas.

Krey remained in Austin until her death on November 6, 1985, at the age of 94. She was buried in a family cemetery in Fulshear, Texas.
