= Stark Young =

American writer (1881–1963)

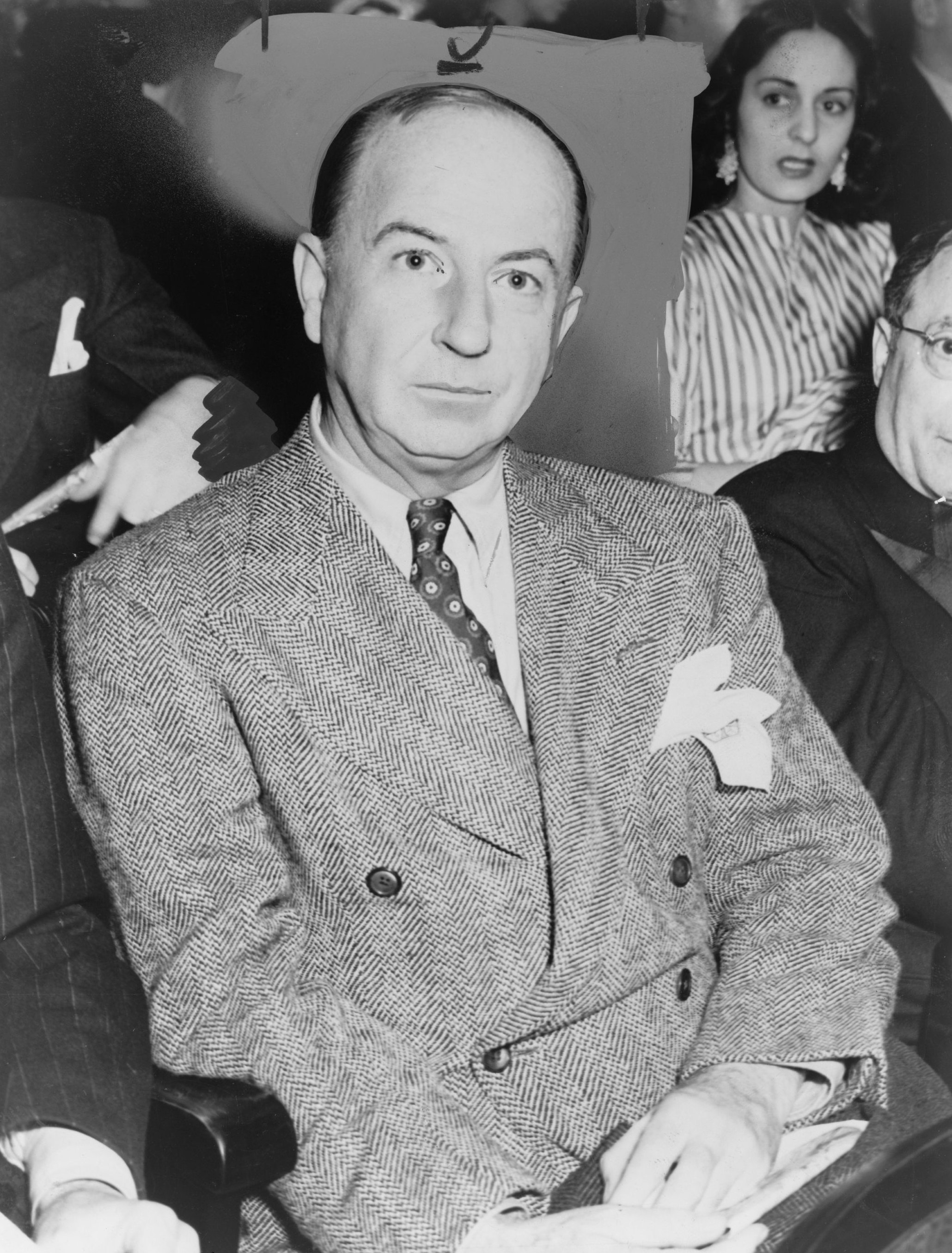
- Young in 1940
- Born: October 11, 1881; Como, Mississippi, United States
- Died: January 6, 1963 (aged 81); Fairfield, Connecticut, United States
- Occupations: author, literary critic, teacher

Stark Young (October 11, 1881 – January 6, 1963) was an American teacher, playwright, novelist, painter, literary critic, translator, and essayist.

Born and raised in Como, Mississippi, Stark lived in Oxford after his mother died in 1890. He attended both the University of Mississippi and University of Columbia, receiving degrees by the time he turned 21.

During his lifetime, Young published many poems, plays, and short stories. Additionally, he was well known for his output of literary criticism, with The New York Times noting that he had a "wealth of dramatic criticism and comment". Young was best known for So Red the Rose (1934), a novel on the American Civil War which became a New York Times best seller and was adapted into a film the next year.

== Biography ==
=== Early life and education ===
Stark Young was born in Como, Mississippi on Oct. 11, 1881, the eldest of three children. His mother, Mary Clark Starks Young, came from a wealthy Virginia planter family, while his father, Alfred Alexander Young, was a Civil War veteran and physician. Stark's younger sister, Julia McGehee Robertson (1884–1962), was a music instructor and socialite, while his younger brother, born in 1886, died as an infant.

Following the birth of her third child, Mary's health began deteriorating. Hoping that her health would recover, Alfred Young moved the family, including Mary's two sisters, to Florida for two years. Despite that, Mary's health did not improve, and on April 4, 1890, she died from either tuberculosis or lung cancer. After her death, Stark spent the next five years of his life in the care of his maternal aunts and uncle.

In 1896, while attending classes in a female academy in Oxford, Young was enrolled into the University of Mississippi as a special student; he became a bona fide freshman in 1897. He received his bachelor's degree from the university in 1901. Travelling north, he received a master's degree in English from Columbia University a year later.

=== Career ===
In 1906, Young published his first two books; The Blind Man at the Window, a poetry collection, and Guenevere, a verse play.

=== Later life and death ===
Young published his last two books, The Pavilion and The Best Plays of Chekhov, in 1951 and 1957 respectively. In 1959, he suffered a debilitating stroke.

On January 6, 1963, at the age of 81, Young died in Carolton Hospital in Fairfield, Connecticut due to pulmonary complications. His funeral services were held at his birthplace of Como three days later. He was honored with a one-page tribute by the poet Allen Tate and his memorial was held at the Morosco Theatre on February 18.

== Works ==
- The Blind Man at the Window (1906)
- Guenevere (1906)
- So Red the Rose (1934)
