= So Red the Rose (novel) =

1934 novel by Stark Young

So Red the Rose is a 1934 novel by American writer Stark Young about the American Civil War.

== Reception ==
The book was on The New York Times Best Seller List.

In a contemporary review, The New York Times gave the novel a positive review, saying “If you would understand what was best in the Old South, its attitude toward life, you will find them here, glowing with that same vitality which was theirs in life.”
