= Lamb in His Bosom =

1933 novel by Caroline Miller

- First edition (Harper & Brothers)
- Author: Caroline Miller
- Language: English
- Publication date: 1933

Lamb in His Bosom is a 1933 novel by Caroline Miller. It won the Pulitzer Prize for the Novel in 1934. It also won the Prix Femina in 1934 and became an immediate best-seller.

The story of a poor white woman growing to maturity in the Pre-Civil War rural south. The personal and extended family struggles, and ups and downs of day-to-day living, in the rural culture. The author mastered the ability to express her thoughts with rural charm, naivety, with the vernacular dialect and cultural biases intact.
