= Anthony Adverse (novel) =

1933 novel by Hervey Allen

- Original book cover
- Author: Hervey Allen
- Language: English
- Genre: Historical fiction
- Published: 1933
- Publisher: Farrar & Rinehart
- Pages: 1272

Anthony Adverse is a 1933 novel by American author Hervey Allen. It was published by Farrar & Rinehart.

The novel contains three volumes: The Roots of the Tree, The Other Bronze Boy and The Lonely Twin, and each volume contains three "books", making for nine books in total.

== Plot ==
The story follows the eponymous protagonist, Anthony Adverse, through several adventures around the world. This includes slave trading in Africa, his business dealings as a plantation owner in New Orleans, and his incarceration and eventual death in Mexico.

== Reception ==
Fanny Butcher of the Chicago Daily Tribune and Peter Monro Jack of The New York Times both gave the novel glowing reviews. Butcher wrote: "It is a thriller de luxe, but it is more than a melodrama of the most intricate happenings. It is the fantastic tale of a fantastic period, and it is the highest expression of the art of the picaresque which our generation has offered." Similarly, Jack wrote: "Anthony Adverse is essentially a story and a very great story, but it gathers up so much wit and wisdom by the way that Mr. Allen is revealed on every page as that rare thing nowadays, a creative humanist [...] We should not be surprised and we could not be anything but pleased if his Anthony Adverse became the best-loved book of our time."

The novel was the Publishers Weekly best-selling novel in the United States for two consecutive years: 1933 and 1934.

== Film adaptation ==
In 1936, the book received a loose movie adaptation, drawing from the first eight books.

== See also ==
- Publishers Weekly list of bestselling novels in the United States in the 1930s
