= Hervey Allen =

American novelist and biographer (1889–1949)

William Hervey Allen Jr.
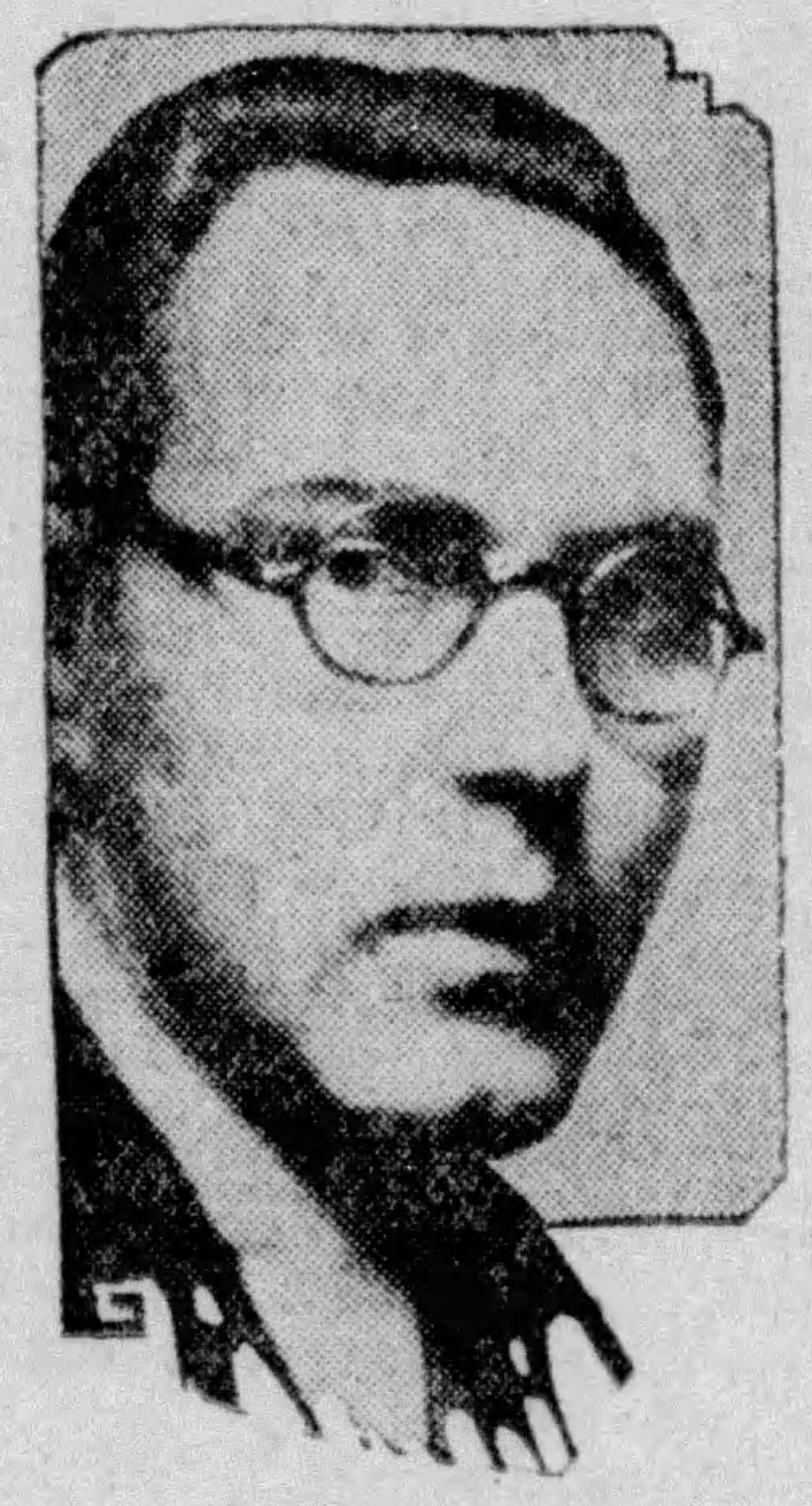
- Born: December 8, 1889; Pittsburgh, Pennsylvania, US
- Died: December 28, 1949 (aged 60); Coconut Grove, Florida, US
- Military career
- Allegiance: United States

William Hervey Allen Jr. (December 8, 1889 – December 28, 1949) was an American educator, poet, and writer. He is best known for his work Anthony Adverse (made into a 1936 movie of the same name), regarded by many critics "as the model and precursor of the contemporary American historical novel."

== Early life ==
Allen was born in Pittsburgh, Pennsylvania, on December 8, 1889, to William Hervey Allen and Helen Ebey Myers. He graduated from Shady Side Academy in 1909. He was a midshipman with the United States Navy from 1909 to 1910, and attended the United States Naval Academy from 1910 to 1911 when he was honorably discharged due to a track and field injury.

Allen received a BS in economics from the University of Pittsburgh in 1915 where he contributed to the humor magazine The Pitt Panther. While at college, he also became a member of the Sigma Chi fraternity.

Allen served as a 2nd lieutenant in the 18th Pennsylvania Infantry on the Mexican border in 1916 during the Pancho Villa Expedition. That year he published a collection of poems, Ballads of the Border. He also served as a lieutenant, and later a company commander of Company "B" of the 1st Battalion, 111th Infantry Regiment of the 28th (keystone) Division, United States Army during World War I and fought in the Aisne-Marne offensive July–August 1918. He was wounded in action at Fismes in August 1918. He also taught English to French soldiers at Favernay.

== Academic career ==
Allen became a professor of English at the University of Pittsburgh. For a period of time, he taught at the Porter Military Academy in Charleston, South Carolina. He also taught English at Charleston High School which at that time, although public, was only for boys (girls went to Memminger High School.) There he met and befriended DuBose Heyward. They collaborated on a volume of poems, Carolina Chansons (1922).

In 1925, he lectured on American Literature at Columbia University. From 1926 to 1927, he was a lecturer on modern poetry at Vassar College, where he met his future wife.

== Writing career ==
He wrote Toward the Flame (1926), a nonfictional account of his experiences in the war. His book, Wampum and Old Gold, was awarded the Yale Younger Poets Prize. Allen is best known for his work Anthony Adverse. The book sold well and the royalties supported Allen and his family for the rest of his life.

Allen greatly admired Thomas Jefferson. "Interest in American history and in a sort of American utopianism would characterize most of his later works." He planned a series of novels about colonial America called The Disinherited. He completed three works in the series: The Forest and the Fort (1943), Bedford Village (1944), and Toward the Morning (1948). The novels tell the story of Salathiel Albine, a frontiersman kidnapped as a boy by Shawnee Indians in the 1750s. All three works were collected and published as the City in the Dawn. Allen also wrote Israfel (1926), a biography of American writer Edgar Allan Poe.

In the 1940s, he co-edited the Rivers of America Series with Carl Carmer. Allen was a good friend of Marjory Stoneman Douglas and instigated her writing The Everglades: River of Grass. Allen was also close friends with Robert Frost and Ogden Nash.

== Personal life ==
He married Ann Andrews on June 30, 1927. The marriage to his much younger former student was viewed as somewhat scandalous, and the couple took up residence in Bermuda. They had three children: Marcia, Mary Ann and Richard.

== Death and legacy ==
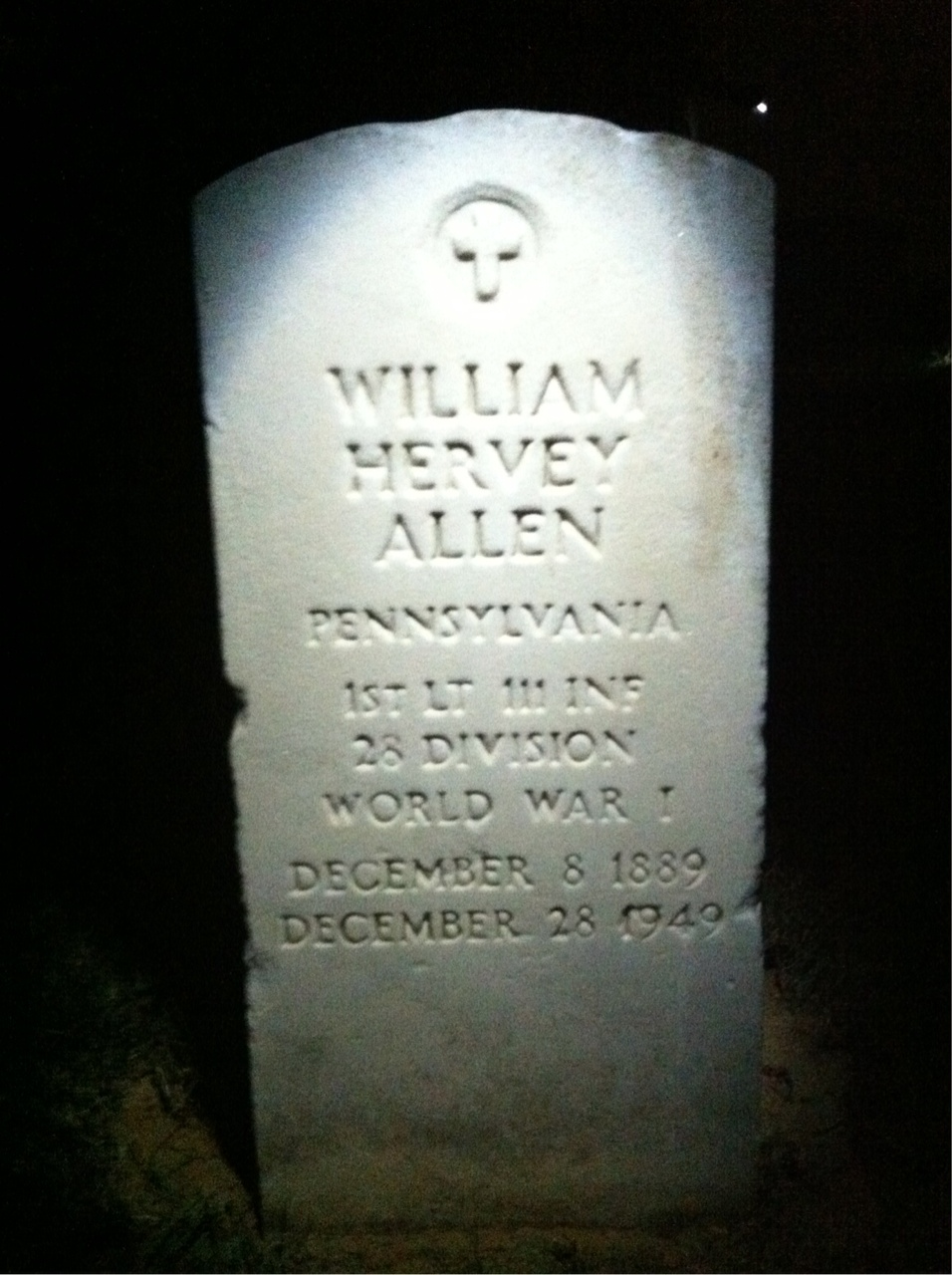
Grave at Arlington National Cemetery

Allen died at his home, called the Glades, in Coconut Grove, Florida, at the age of 60, from a heart attack, and was found by his wife. He is buried in section 3 GN 1730C in Arlington National Cemetery.

== Selected works ==
- Wampum and Old Gold. Yale University Press. 1921. "Hervey Allen."
- Toward the Flame, George H. Doran Company, 1926 reprint. University of Nebraska Press. 2003. ISBN 978-0-8032-5947-8.
- Israfel: The Life and Times of Edgar Allan Poe (1926) reissued 1934.
- Anthony Adverse (1933) ISBN 4-87187-890-2
- Action at Aquila, Farrar & Rinehart, (1938)
- The Forest and the Fort (1943)
- Bedford Village (1944)
- Toward the Morning (1948)
- The City in the Dawn (1950)
- Achmed Abdullah, Hervey Allen, ed. (2003). Lute and Scimitar. Kessinger Publishing. ISBN 978-0-7661-7626-3. (reprint)

== See also ==
- Anthony Adverse (1936 Hollywood film)
