= 1894 =

1894 in various calendars
- Gregorian calendar: 1894; MDCCCXCIV
- Ab urbe condita: 2647
- Armenian calendar: 1343; ԹՎ ՌՅԽԳ
- Assyrian calendar: 6644
- Baháʼí calendar: 50–51
- Balinese saka calendar: 1815–1816
- Bengali calendar: 1300–1301
- Berber calendar: 2844
- British Regnal year: 57 Vict. 1 – 58 Vict. 1
- Buddhist calendar: 2438
- Burmese calendar: 1256
- Byzantine calendar: 7402–7403
- Chinese calendar: 癸巳年 (Water Snake); 4591 or 4384 — to — 甲午年 (Wood Horse); 4592 or 4385
- Coptic calendar: 1610–1611
- Discordian calendar: 3060
- Ethiopian calendar: 1886–1887
- Hebrew calendar: 5654–5655
- Hindu calendars
- Vikram Samvat: 1950–1951
- Shaka Samvat: 1815–1816
- Kali Yuga: 4994–4995
- Holocene calendar: 11894
- Igbo calendar: 894–895
- Iranian calendar: 1272–1273
- Islamic calendar: 1311–1312
- Japanese calendar: Meiji 27 (明治２７年)
- Javanese calendar: 1823–1824
- Julian calendar: Gregorian minus 12 days
- Korean calendar: 4227
- Minguo calendar: 18 before ROC 民前18年
- Nanakshahi calendar: 426
- Thai solar calendar: 2436–2437
- Tibetan calendar: ཆུ་མོ་སྦྲུལ་ལོ་ (female Water-Snake); 2020 or 1639 or 867 — to — ཤིང་ཕོ་རྟ་ལོ་ (male Wood-Horse); 2021 or 1640 or 868

1894 (MDCCCXCIV) was a common year starting on Monday of the Gregorian calendar and a common year starting on Saturday of the Julian calendar, the 1894th year of the Common Era (CE) and Anno Domini (AD) designations, the 894th year of the 2nd millennium, the 94th year of the 19th century, and the 5th year of the 1890s decade. As of the start of 1894, the Gregorian calendar was 12 days ahead of the Julian calendar, which remained in localized use until 1923.

== Events ==
=== January ===
- January 4 – A military alliance is established between the French Third Republic and the Russian Empire.
- January 7 – William Kennedy Dickson receives a patent for motion picture film in the United States.
- January 9 – New England Telephone and Telegraph installs the first battery-operated telephone switchboard, in Lexington, Massachusetts.

=== February ===
- February 12 – Ère des attentats: Café Terminus attack – In one of the first acts of modern terrorism, French anarchist Émile Henry throws a bomb into the Café Terminus in Paris, France, killing one person and injuring at least seventeen.
- February 15
  - In Korea, peasant unrest erupts in the Donghak Peasant Revolution, a massive revolt by followers of the Donghak movement. Both China and Japan send military forces, claiming to come to the ruling Joseon dynasty government's aid.
  - French anarchist Martial Bourdin dies of an accidental detonation of his own bomb, next to the Royal Observatory, Greenwich, in London, England.

=== March ===
- March 2 – William Gladstone resigns as British Prime Minister.
- March 5 – The Local Government Act (coming into effect December 1894–January 1895) reforms local government in Britain, creating a system of urban and rural districts with elected councils, with elected civil parish councils in rural areas, and gives women, irrespective of marital status, the right to vote and stand in local (but not national) elections.
- March 12 – Coca-Cola is sold in bottles for the first time.
- March 21 – A syzygy of planets occurs, as Mercury transits the Sun as seen from Venus, and Mercury and Venus both transit the Sun as seen from Saturn, but no two of the transits are simultaneous.
- March 25 – Coxey's Army (of the unemployed), the first significant protest march in the United States, departs from Massillon, Ohio, for Washington, D.C.

=== April ===
- April 16 – Manchester City Football Club is formed in north-west England under this name.
- April 21 – A bituminous coal miners' strike closes mines across the central United States.
- April 27 – Canada's largest known landslide occurs in Saint-Alban, Quebec, displacing 185 million cubic metres (6.5×10^{9} cu ft) of rock and dirt, and leaving a 40-metre (130 ft) scar that covers 4.6 million square metres (50×10^{6} sq ft).

=== May ===
- May 1 – In protests by the unemployed in the United States:
  - Coxey's Army arrives in Washington; Coxey is arrested on the Capitol grounds.
  - May Day riots break out in Cleveland, Ohio.
- May 11 – Pullman Strike: Three thousand Pullman Palace Car Company factory workers go on a "wildcat" (without union approval) strike in Illinois.
- May 14 – Blackpool Tower is opened in Blackpool, in north-west England, as a visitor attraction.
- May 21 – The Manchester Ship Canal and Docks are officially opened by Queen Victoria, linking the previously landlocked industrial city of Manchester, in north-west England, to the Irish Sea.
- May – Third plague pandemic: Bubonic plague breaks out in the Tai Ping Shan area of Hong Kong (by the end of the year, the death toll is 2,552 people); it also breaks out this year in Canton.

=== June ===
- June 18 – Britain establishes a protectorate over Uganda.
- June 22 – Dahomey becomes a French colony.
- June 23 – The International Olympic Committee is founded at the Sorbonne, Paris, at the initiative of Baron Pierre de Coubertin.
- June 24 – Sadi Carnot, president of France, is assassinated in Lyon.
- June 30 – Tower Bridge in London opens for traffic.

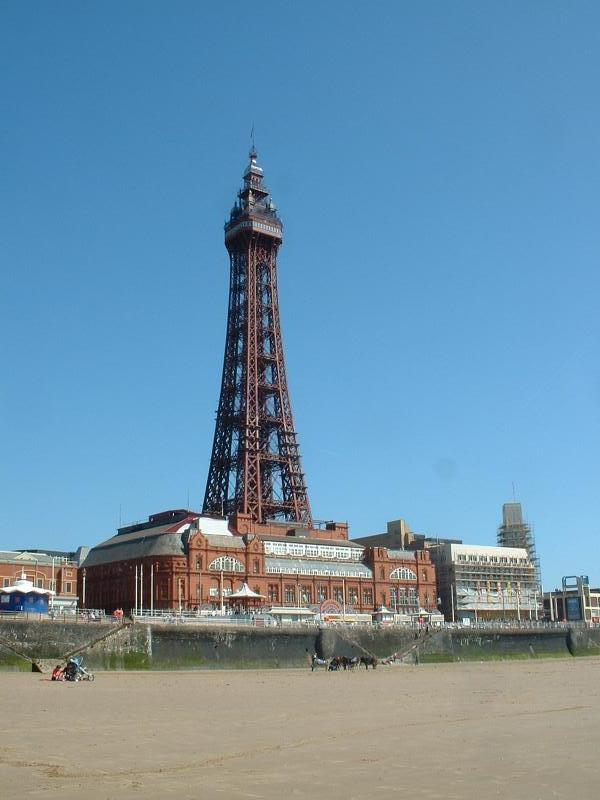
May 14: Blackpool Tower.

=== July ===
- July 4
  - The short-lived Republic of Hawaii is proclaimed by Sanford B. Dole.
  - The football club FC La Chaux-de-Fonds is founded in Switzerland.
- July 6 – A fire at the site of the 1893 World's Columbian Exposition in Chicago destroys most of the remaining buildings.
- July 16 – The United Kingdom and Japan sign the Anglo-Japanese Treaty of Commerce and Navigation, as the U.K. becomes the first of the Western nations to agree to give up its extraterritorial rights in Japan.
- July 22 – The Paris–Rouen Competition for Horseless Carriages, the first automobile competition, is held.

=== August ===
- August 1 – War is declared between the Qing Empire of China and the Empire of Japan over their rival claims of influence on their common ally, the Joseon dynasty of Korea. The event marks the start of the First Sino-Japanese War.
- August 16 – Italian anarchist Sante Geronimo Caserio is executed by guillotine for the assassination of French President Carnot in Lyon.
- August 31 – New Zealand enacts the world's first minimum wage law, to take effect on January 1, in the passage of the Industrial Conciliation and Arbitration Act of 1894.

=== September ===
- September 1 – Great Hinckley Fire: A forest fire in Hinckley, Minnesota, kills more than 450 people.
- September 4 – In New York City, 12,000 tailors strike against sweatshop working conditions.
- September 10 – Richard Strauss marries Pauline De Ahna.
- September 26 – The SS Ohio (1875) and the schooner barge Ironton collide and sink in Lake Huron. While the crew of the Ohio is rescued, five of the other craft's seven-member crew, including the captain, are lost.

=== October ===
- October 1 – Petrópolis becomes the capital of the Brazilian state of Rio de Janeiro, until 1902.
- October 15 – Dreyfus affair: French Army officer Alfred Dreyfus is arrested for spying.
- October 30 – Domenico Menegatti obtains a patent for a procedure to be applied in producing pandoro industrially.

=== November ===
- November 1

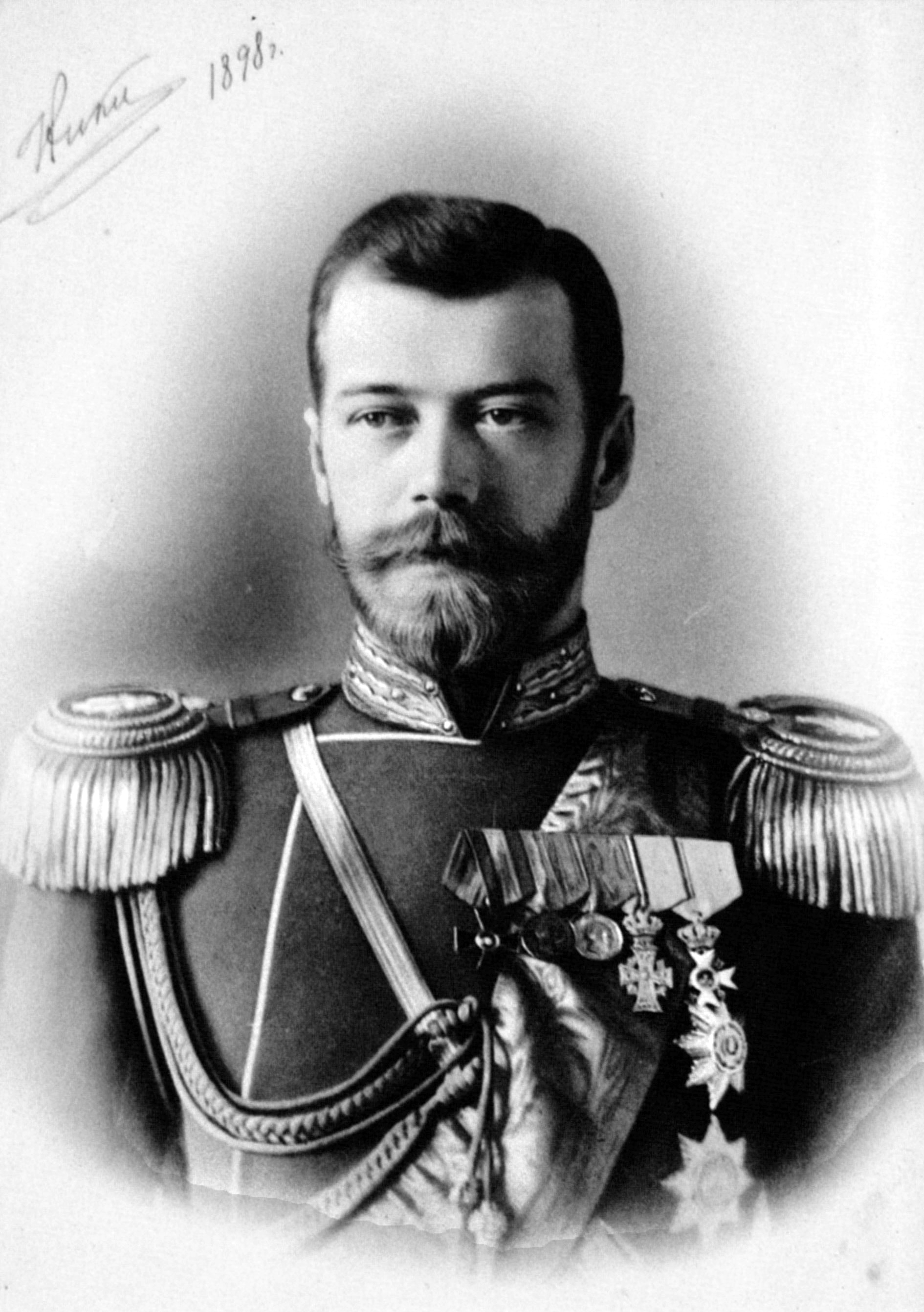
November 1: Nicholas II becomes Tsar of Russia.

  - Emperor Alexander III of Russia is succeeded by his son, Nicholas II.
  - The first issue of Billboard magazine is published in Cincinnati, Ohio by William Donaldson and James Hennegan. Initially, it covers the advertising and bill posting industry, and is at the time known as Billboard Advertising.
- November 3 – Waziristan campaign (1894–1895): Battle of Wana Camp – British colonial forces stationed in Wana would come under attack by rebel Mahsud tribesmen. The battle began a campaign of offensive actions against the Mahsud tribes in Waziristan to reduce their strength.
- November 6 – Republicans win by a landslide in the United States House of Representatives elections, which sets the stage for the decisive presidential election of 1896.
- November 7 – The Masonic Grande Loge de France is founded, splitting from the larger and older Grand Orient de France.
- November 8 – The Italian cargo steamship Etnea struck the rocks of the islet of Školjić west of Unije and sank.
- November 21 – First Sino-Japanese War: Battle of Lushunkou – Japanese troops secure a decisive victory over the Chinese, capture the port city of Lüshunkou, and begin the Port Arthur massacre, in which more than 1,000 Chinese servicemen and civilians die.
- November 26 – Wedding of Nicholas II of Russia and Alix of Hesse in the Grand Church of the Winter Palace at Saint Petersburg.

=== December ===
- December 6 – Kate Chopin's feminist short story "The Story of an Hour" is first published, in the American magazine Vogue.
- December 18 – Women in South Australia become the first in Australia to gain the right to vote and the first in the world with the right to be elected to Parliament, taking effect from 1895, after decades of activism.
- December 21 – Mackenzie Bowell becomes Canada's fifth prime minister.
- December 22 – Dreyfus affair: French Army officer Alfred Dreyfus is convicted of treason. It will be 12 years before his innocence is officially recognised.

=== Date unknown ===
- The Society of Beaux-Arts Architects is founded in the United States.
- Oil is discovered on the Osage Indian reservation, making the Osage the "richest group of people in the world".
- Edward B. Marks and Joe Stern publish the waltz The Little Lost Child in the United States, promoting the playing of the waltz with slides projected by a magic lantern, the earliest version of music video known as the illustrated song.
- Spillers Records is founded in Cardiff (Wales), the world's oldest record shop still in operation.
- The Liga Femeilor Române, the first women's organisation in Romania, is founded.

== Births ==
=== January–February ===
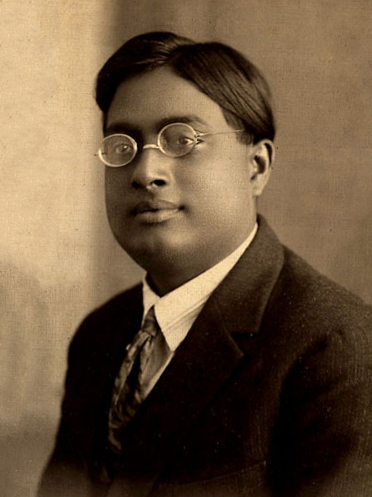
Satyendra Nath Bose

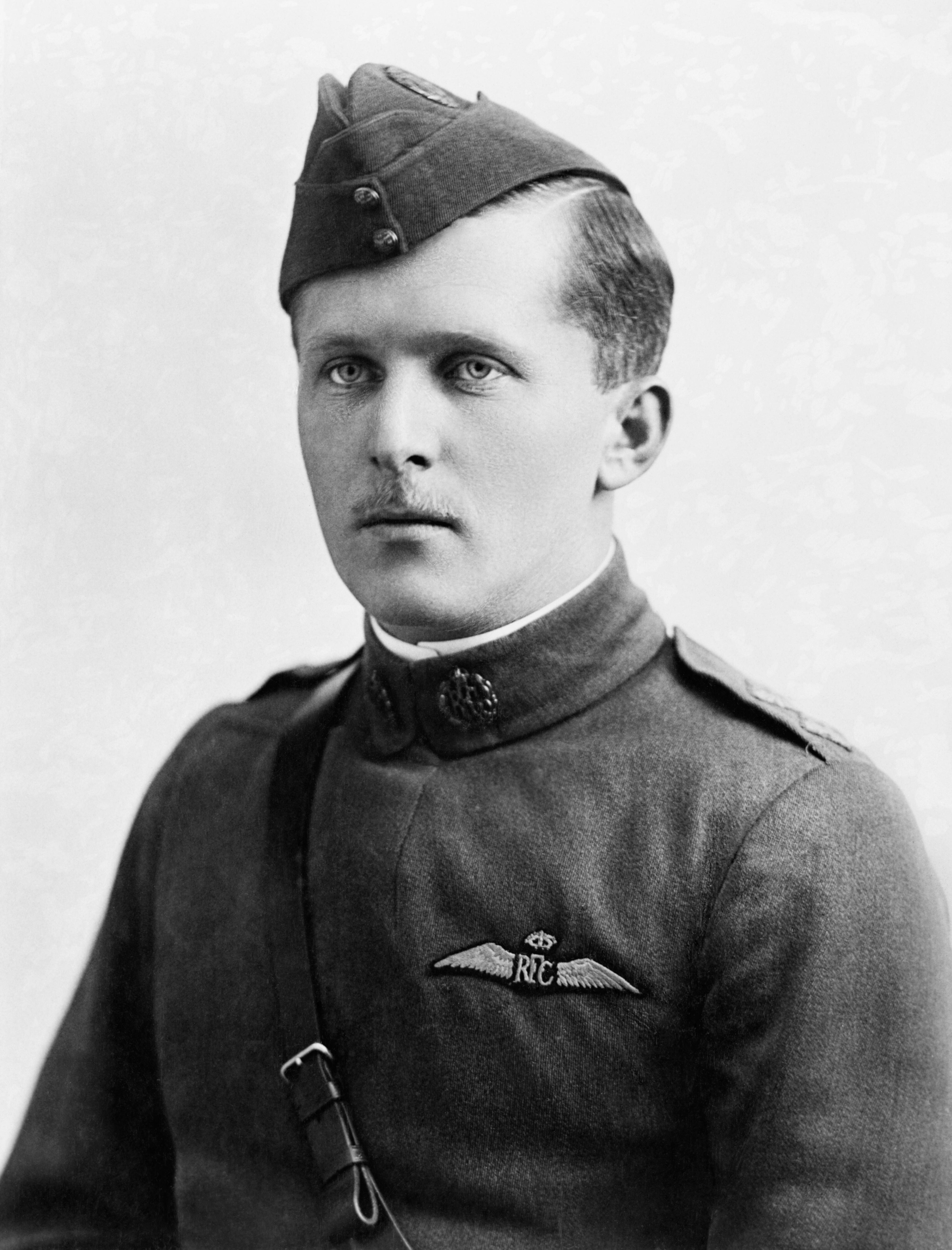
Billy Bishop

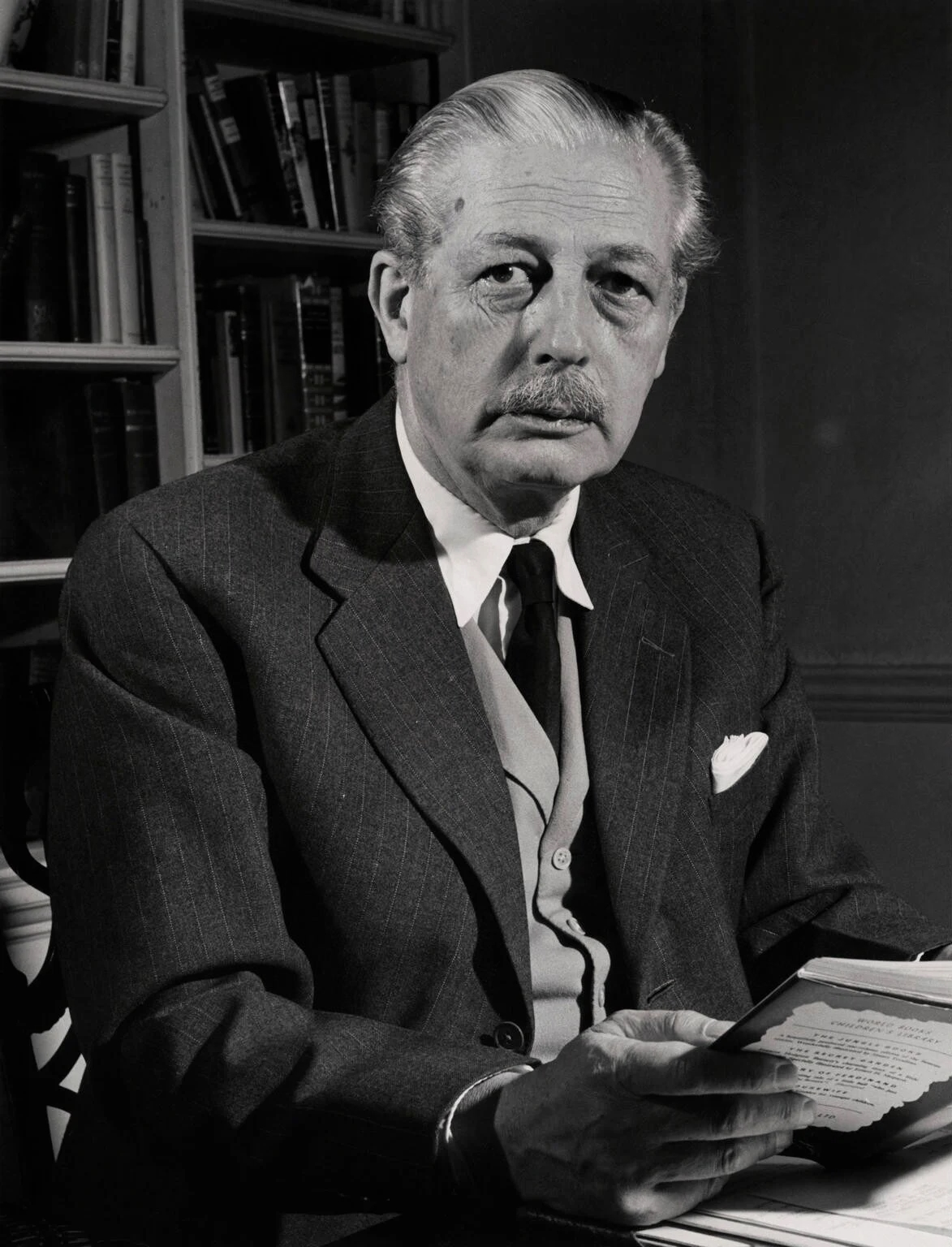
Harold Macmillan

- January 1 – Satyendra Nath Bose, Indian physicist (d. 1974)
- January 3 – ZaSu Pitts, American actress (d. 1963)
- January 8 – Maximilian Kolbe, Polish friar and martyr (k. 1941 in Auschwitz concentration camp)
- January 15 – José Bustamante y Rivero, Peruvian politician, diplomat and jurist, 78th President of Peru (d. 1989)
- January 19 – Špelca Mladič, Slovenian painterand designer (d. 1981)
- January 20 – Walter Piston, American composer (d. 1976)
- January 21 – Geoffrey Street, Australian politician (d. 1940)
- January 30
  - King Boris III of Bulgaria (d. 1943)
  - René Dorme, French World War I fighter ace (d. 1917)
- January 31
  - Isham Jones, American bandleader (d. 1956)
  - Percy Helton, American film, television actor (d. 1971)
- February 1
  - John Ford, American film director (d. 1973)
  - Dick Merrill, American aviation pioneer (d. 1982)
- February 3 – Norman Rockwell, American artist, illustrator (d. 1978)
- February 8 – Billy Bishop, Canadian World War I fighter ace (d. 1956)
- February 10
  - Harold Macmillan, Prime Minister of the United Kingdom (d. 1986)
  - Mãe Menininha do Gantois, Brazilian spiritual leader (iyalorixá) (d. 1986)
- February 14 – Jack Benny, American actor, comedian (d. 1974)
- February 25 – Meher Baba, Indian Avatar of the Age (d. 1969)
- February 26
  - Wilhelm Bittrich, German Waffen SS general (d. 1979)
  - Ernest N. Harmon, American general (d. 1979)
- February 28 – Ben Hecht, American playwright, film writer (d. 1964)

=== March–April ===
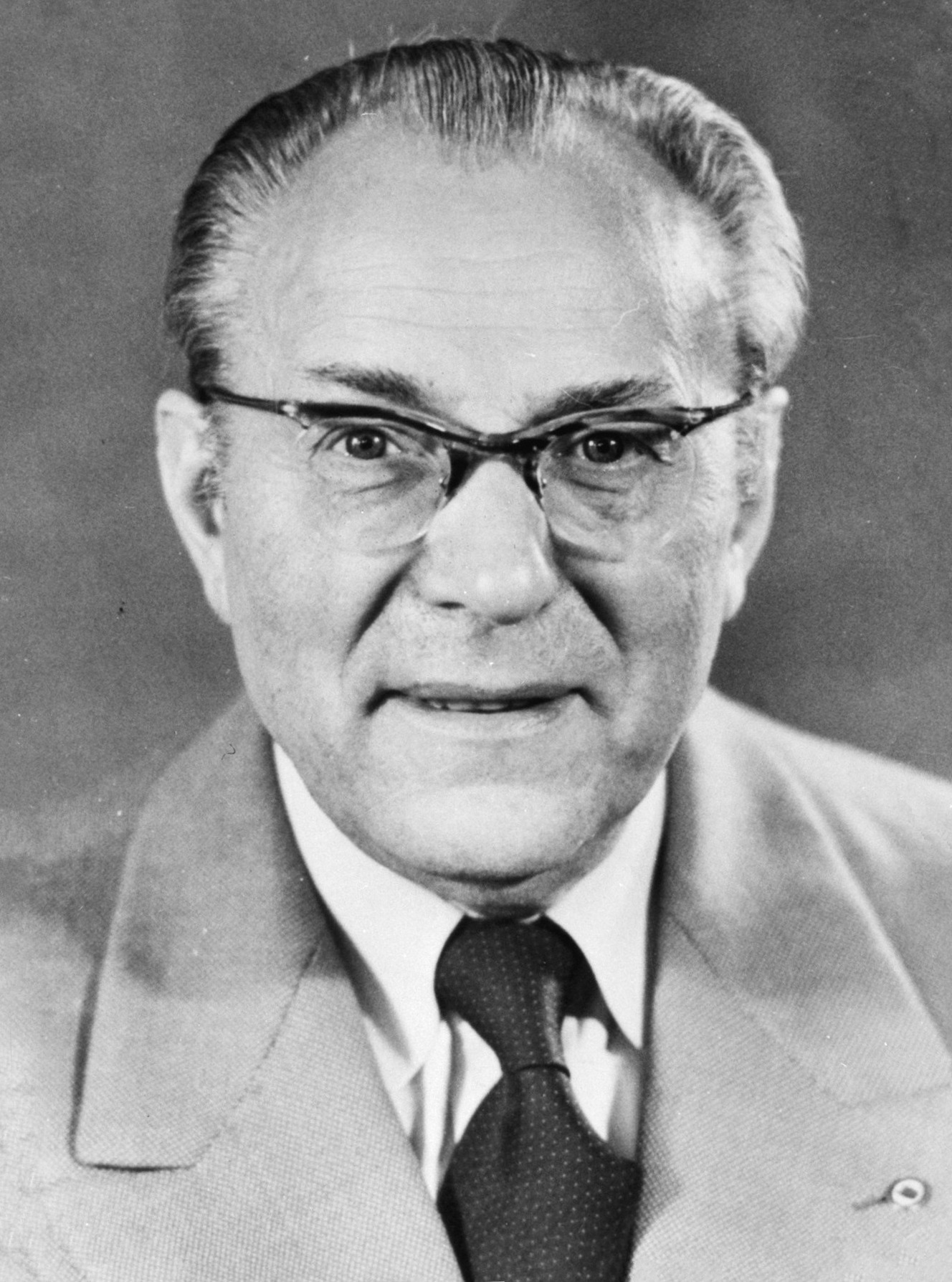
Otto Grotewohl

Francisco Craveiro Lopes

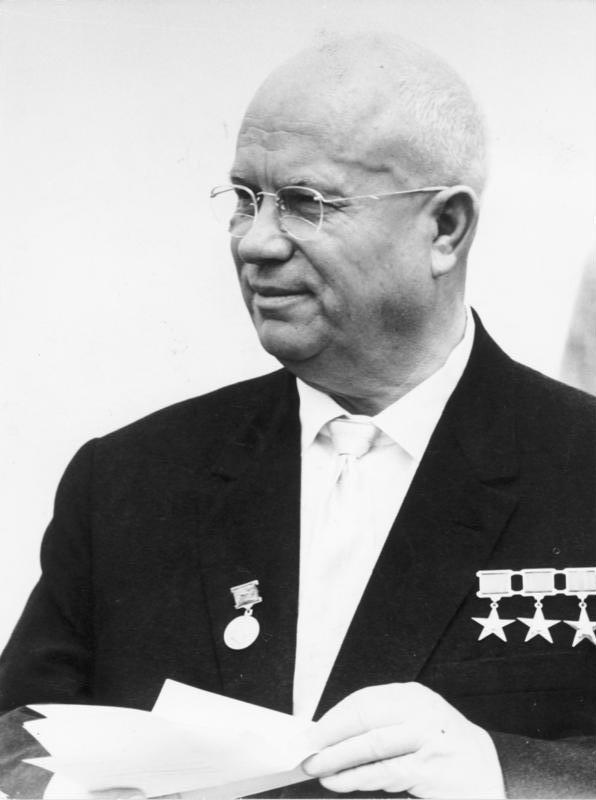
Nikita Khrushchev

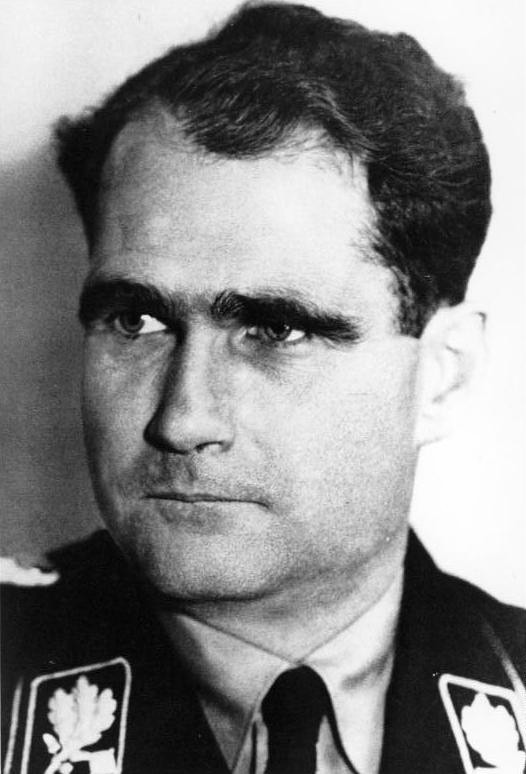
Rudolf Hess

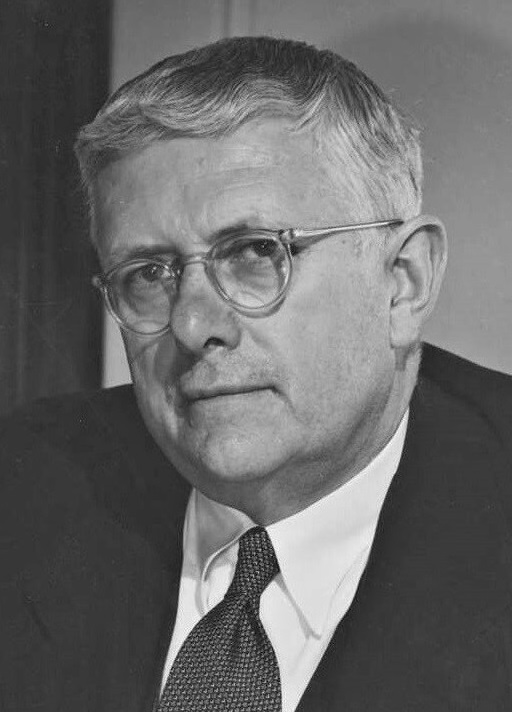
H.V. Evatt

- March 7 – Marcel Déat, French politician (d. 1955)
- March 11 – Otto Grotewohl, East German Communist politician, 1st Prime Minister of the German Democratic Republic (d. 1964)
- March 14 – Osa Johnson, American adventurer, documentary filmmaker (d. 1953)
- March 16 – Stuart Buchanan, American actor (d. 1974)
- March 17 – Paul Green, American novelist, Pulitzer Prize-winning playwright (d. 1981)
- March 19 – Moms Mabley, African-American comedian (d. 1975)
- March 20
  - Hans Langsdorff, German naval officer (d. 1939)
  - Amalie Sara Colquhoun, Australian painter (d. 1974)
- March 21 – Doel Reed, American printmaker, painter, and educator (d. 1985)
- March 26 – May Farquharson, Jamaican social worker, birth control advocate, philanthropist and reformer (d. 1992)
- March 27 – René Fonck, French World War I flying ace (d. 1953)
- April 5 – Chesney Allen, British entertainer (d. 1982)
- April 10
  - G.D. Birla, Indian industrialist, Gandhian and educationalist (d. 1983)
  - Ben Nicholson, English abstract artist (d. 1982)
  - Archibald Roosevelt, American conservative political activist, son of President Theodore Roosevelt (d. 1979)
- April 12 – Francisco Craveiro Lopes, 12th President of Portugal (d. 1964)
- April 13 – Sir Arthur Fadden, 13th Prime Minister of Australia (d. 1973)
- April 15 – Bessie Smith, African-American blues singer (d. 1937)
- April 17 – Nikita Khrushchev, Soviet politician (d. 1971)
- April 26 – Rudolf Hess, German Nazi official (d. 1987)
- April 27 – Nicolas Slonimsky, Russian/American musicologist (d. 1995)
- April 30 – H.V. Evatt, Australian politician, judge (d. 1965)

=== May–June ===
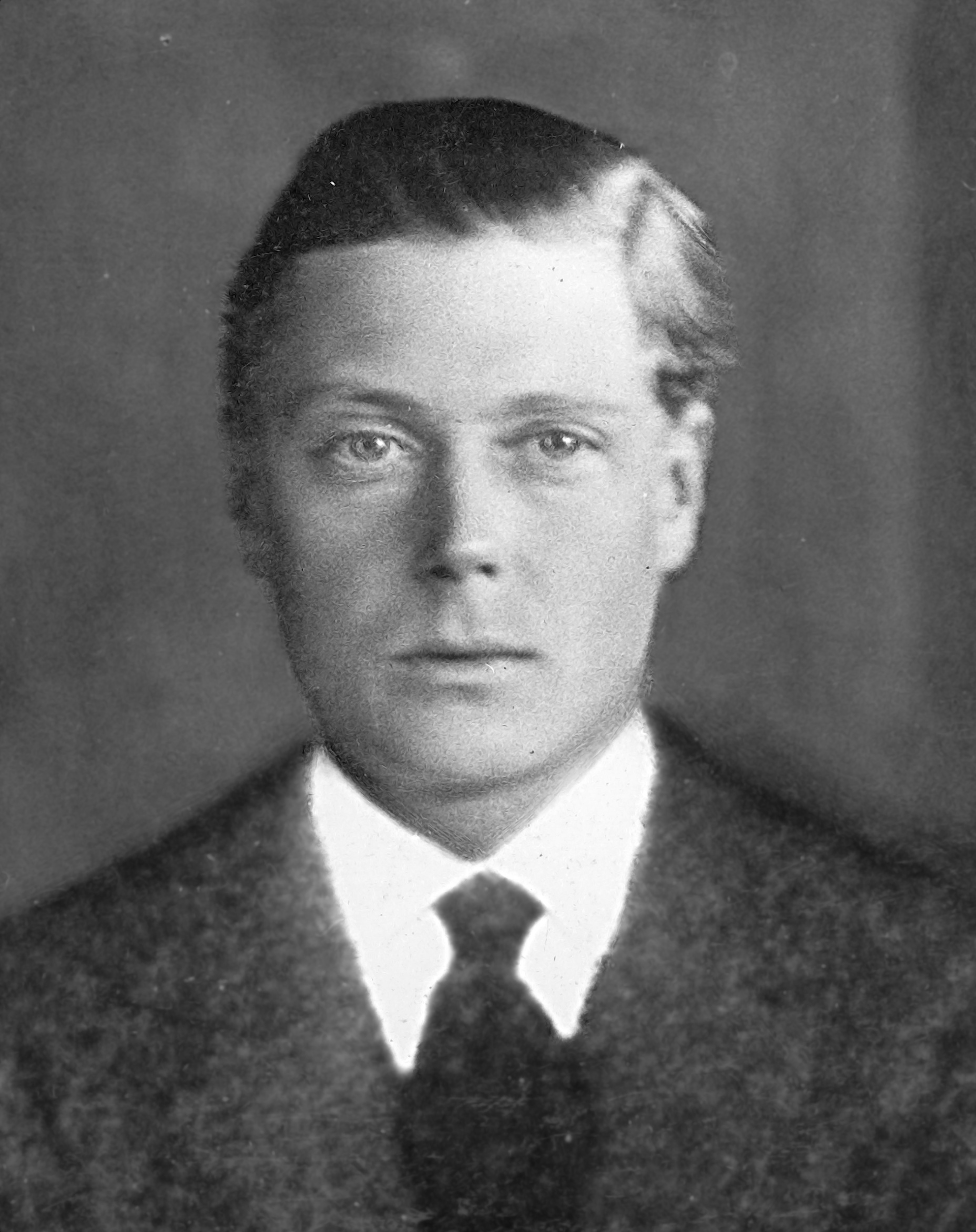
Edward VIII

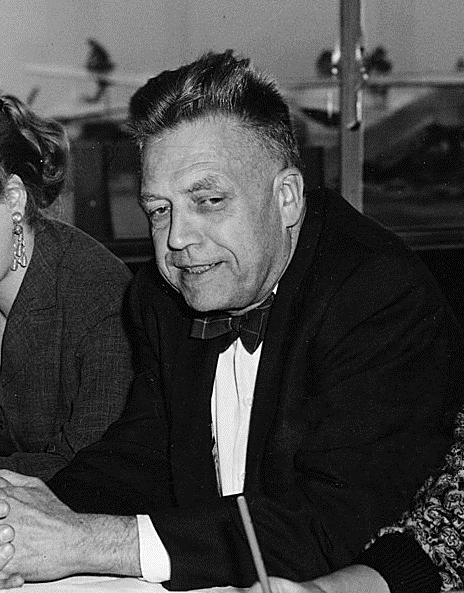
Alfred Kinsey

- May 10
  - Horia Macellariu, Romanian admiral (d. 1989)
  - Dimitri Tiomkin, Ukrainian-born composer (d. 1979)
- May 11 – Martha Graham, American dancer, choreographer (d. 1991)
- May 13 – Ásgeir Ásgeirsson, 2nd President of Iceland (d. 1972)
- May 20
  - Estelle Taylor, American actress (d. 1958)
  - Chandrashekarendra Saraswati, Indian religious scholar, saint (d. 1994)
- May 26 – Paul Lukas, Hungarian actor (d. 1971)
- May 27
  - Louis-Ferdinand Céline, French writer (d. 1961)
  - Dashiell Hammett, American detective fiction writer (d. 1961)
- May 29 – Josef von Sternberg, Austrian-American film director (d. 1969)
- May 30 – Hubertus van Mook, Dutch Acting Governor-General of the Dutch East Indies (d. 1965)
- May 31 – Fred Allen, American comedian (d. 1956)
- June 4 – Gabriel Pascal, Hungarian film producer (d. 1954)
- June 5 – Roy Thomson, Canadian publisher (d. 1976)
- June 9 – Nedo Nadi, Italian fencer (d. 1940)
- June 14
  - Marie-Adélaïde, Grand Duchess of Luxembourg (d. 1924)
  - W. W. E. Ross, Canadian geophysicist, poet (d. 1966)
- June 23
  - King Edward VIII of the United Kingdom (afterwards The Duke of Windsor) (d. 1972)
  - Harold Barrowclough, New Zealand general, lawyer and chief justice (d. 1972)
  - Alfred Kinsey, American sexologist (d. 1956)
- June 28
  - Francis Hunter, American tennis player (d. 1981)
  - Lois Wilson, American actress (d. 1988)

=== July–August ===
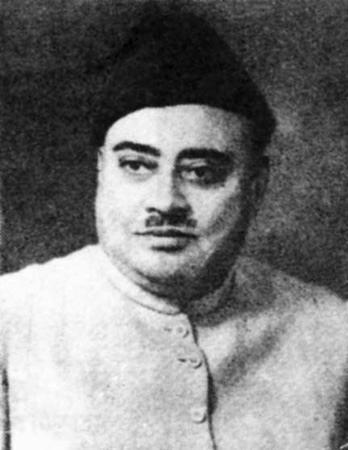
Khawaja Nazimuddin

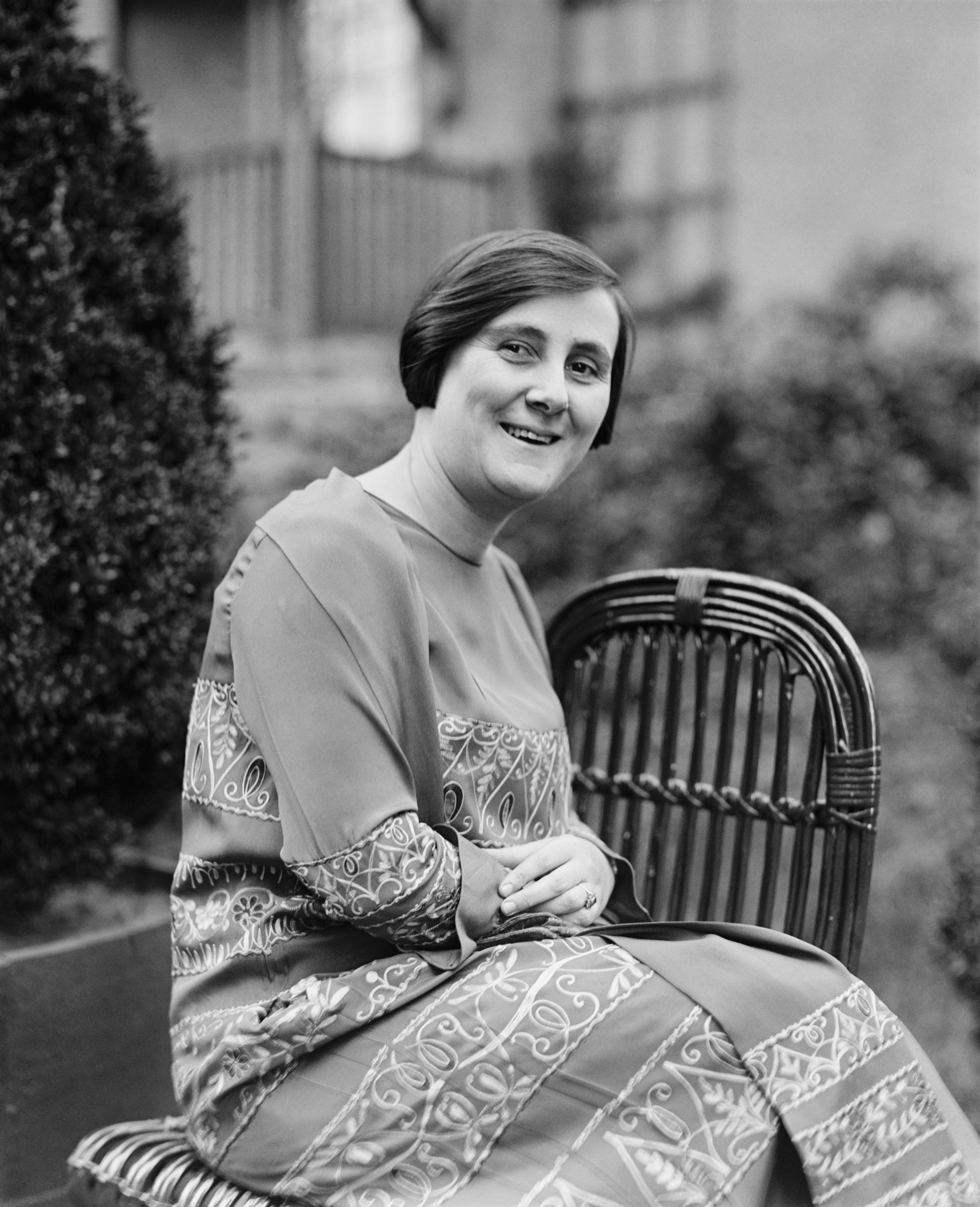
Bertha Lutz

- July 8 – Pyotr Kapitsa, Russian physicist, Nobel Prize laureate (d. 1984)
- July 17 – Georges Lemaître, Belgian physicist, astronomer (d. 1966)
- July 18 – Mariano Rossell y Arellano, Guatemalan Roman Catholic clergyman (d. 1964)
- July 19
  - Jerzy Pajączkowski-Dydyński, British-based Polish veteran of World War I (d. 2005)
  - Khawaja Nazimuddin, 2nd Prime Minister of Pakistan (d. 1964)
- July 20 – Wiley Rutledge, Associate Justice of the Supreme Court of the United States (d. 1949)
- July 22 – María Sabina, Mexican curandera (d. 1985)
- July 25
  - Walter Brennan, American actor (d. 1974)
  - Yvonne Printemps, French singer and actress (d. 1977)
- July 26 – Aldous Huxley, English novelist (d. 1963)
- August 1
  - Benjamin Mays, American Baptist minister and civil rights leader (d. 1984)
  - Kurt Wintgens, German fighter pilot, air ace in World War I (d. 1916)
- August 2 – Bertha Lutz, Brazilian zoologist, politician, diplomat and feminist (d. 1976)
- August 3 – Harry Heilmann, American baseball player (d. 1951)
- August 10
  - V. V. Giri, Indian politician, 4th President of India (d. 1980)
  - Alan Crosland, American film director (d. 1936)
- August 16 – George Meany, American labor leader (d. 1980)
- August 17 – Riad Al Solh, 2-Time Prime Minister of Lebanon (d. 1951)
- August 28 – Karl Böhm, Austrian conductor (d. 1981)

=== September–October ===
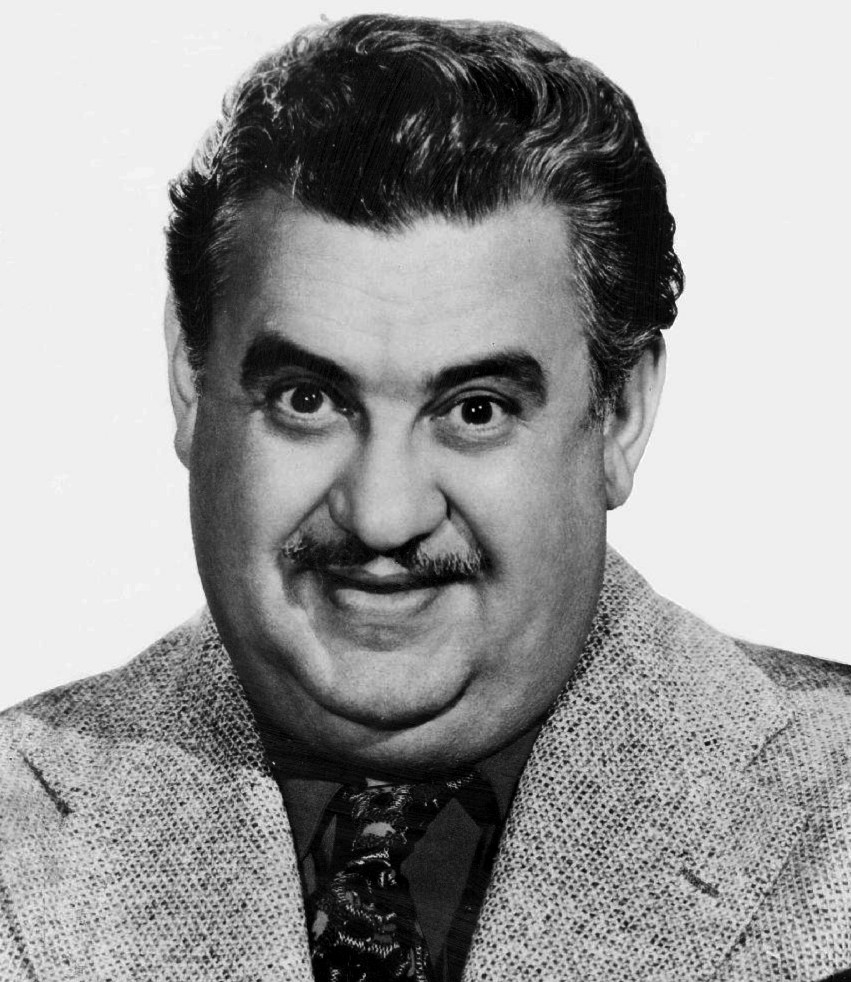
Billy Gilbert

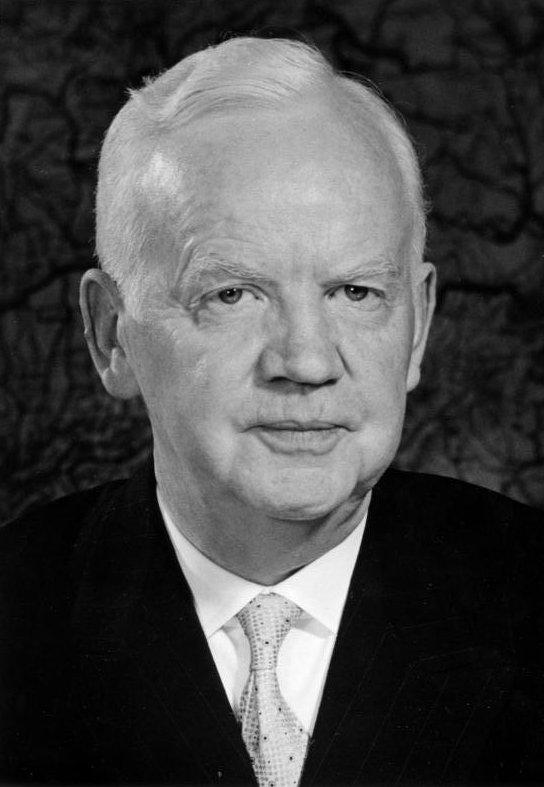
Heinrich Lübke

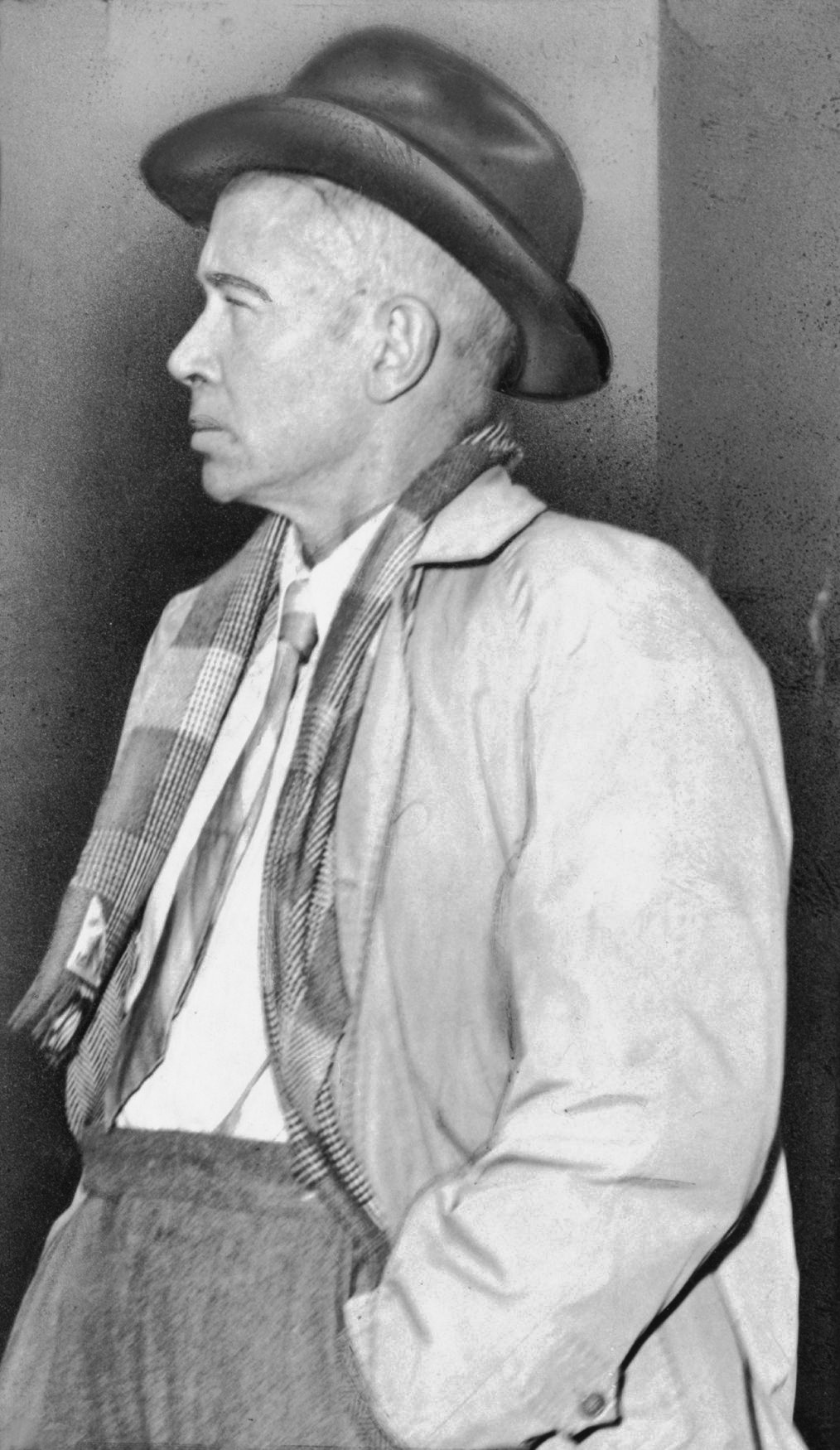
E. E. Cummings

- September 2 – Joseph Roth, Austrian writer (d. 1939)
- September 3 – Benigno Aquino Sr., Filipino politician (d. 1947)
- September 4 – Daniel van der Meulen, Dutch diplomat (d. 1989)
- September 6 – Howard Pease, American adventure novelist (d. 1974)
- September 12
  - Billy Gilbert, American actor and comedian (d. 1971)
  - Dorothy Maud Wrinch, British mathematician and biochemical theorist (d. 1976)
- September 13
  - J. B. Priestley, English novelist, playwright (d. 1984)
  - Idris Ahmed Mia, Bengali politician (d. 1966)
  - Julian Tuwim, Polish poet (d. 1953)
- September 15 – Jean Renoir, French film director (d. 1979)
- September 19 – Raymond Duval, French general (d. 1955)
- September 24
  - Tommy Armour, Scottish golfer (d. 1968)
  - Harry B. Liversedge, American general (d. 1951)
  - Billy Bletcher, American actor (d. 1979)
- September 27 – Lothar von Richthofen, German World War I fighter ace (d. 1922)
- October 1 – Beatrice Green, Welsh labour activist (d. 1927)
- October 5 – Bevil Rudd, South African athlete (d. 1948)
- October 7 – Herman Dooyeweerd, Dutch philosopher and professor of law (d. 1977)
- October 14
  - E. E. Cummings, American poet (d. 1962)
  - Heinrich Lübke, German president (d. 1972)
- October 15 – Moshe Sharett, Israeli Prime Minister (d. 1965)
- October 18 – H. L. Davis, American fiction writer (d. 1960)
- October 21 – Albert F. Nufer, American diplomat and ambassador (d. 1956)
- October 25
  - Claude Cahun, French photographer, writer (d. 1954)
  - Âşık Veysel, Turkish poet, songwriter and saz player (d. 1973)
- October 27 – Fritz Sauckel, German Nazi politician, war criminal (d. 1946)
- October 28 – Ismail of Johor, Malaysian sultan (d. 1981)
- October 30 – Peter Warlock, English composer (d. 1930)

=== November–December ===
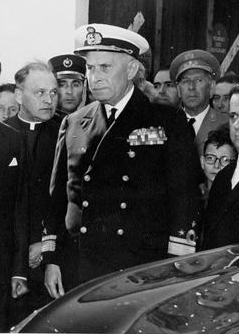
Américo Tomás

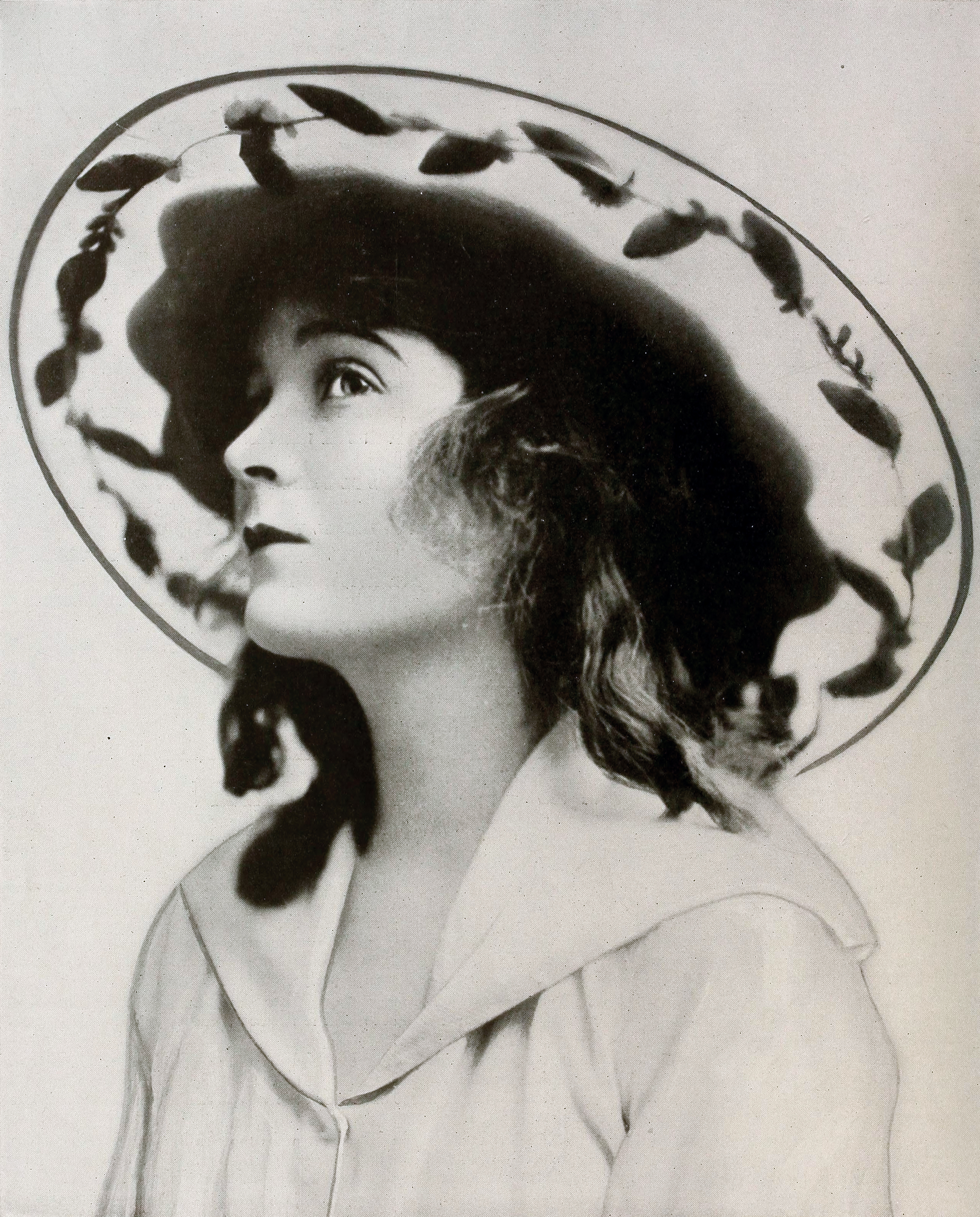
Mae Marsh

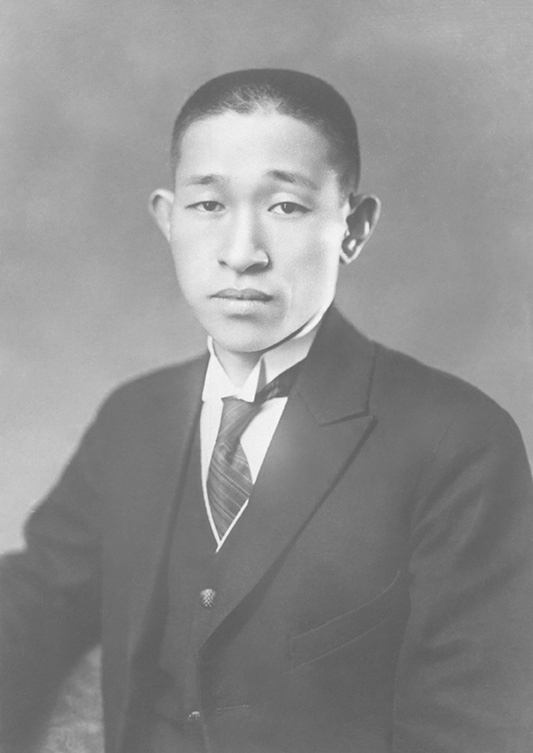
Kōnosuke Matsushita

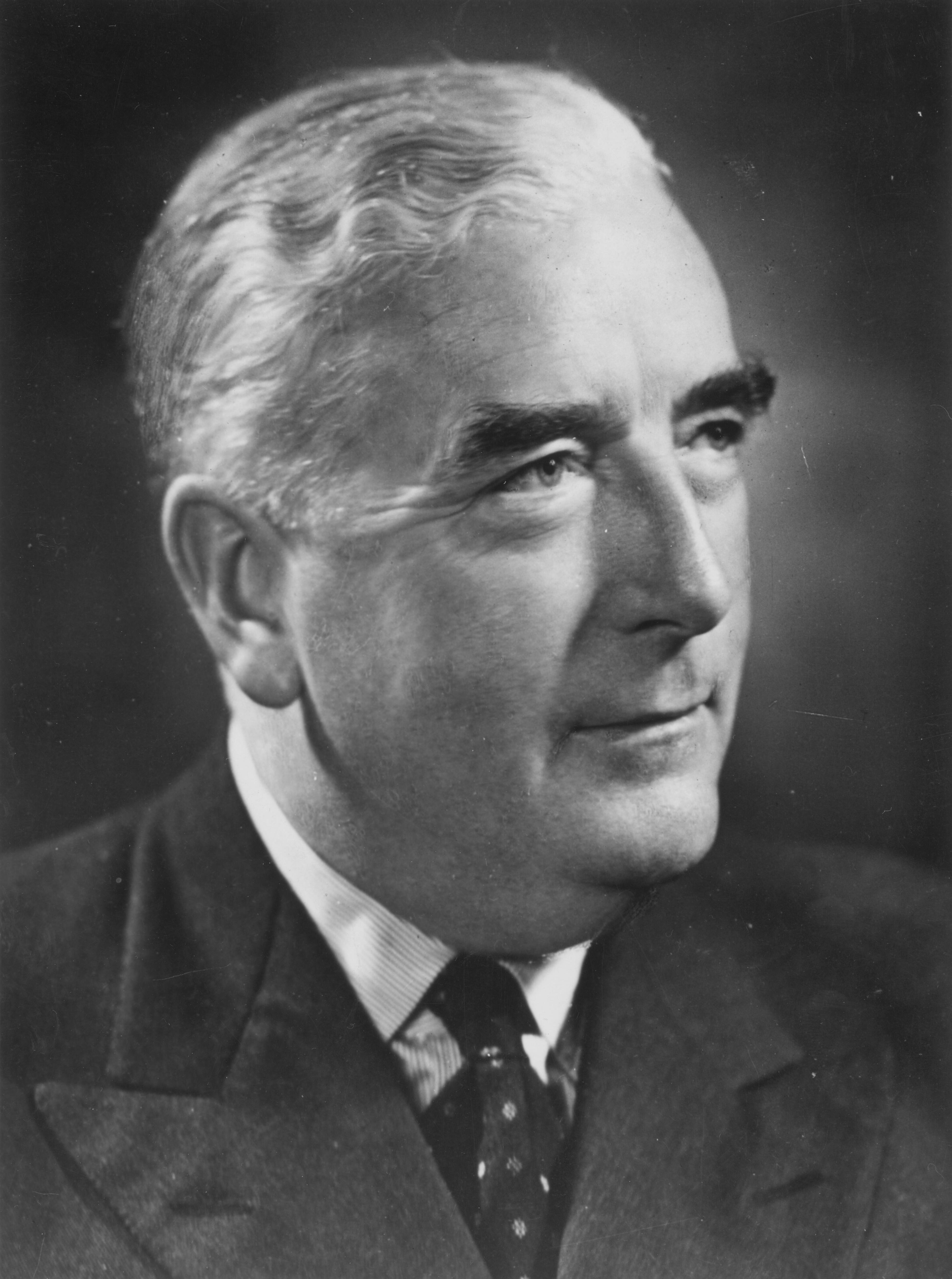
Robert Menzies

- November 2 – Alexander Lippisch, German aerodynamics engineer (d. 1976)
- November 3
  - Heinrich Kroll, German fighter ace (d. 1930)
  - Sofoklis Venizelos, three-time prime minister of Greece (d. 1964)
- November 4 – Gabriel Auphan, French admiral and politician (d. 1982)
- November 5 – Harold Innis, Canadian communications scholar (d. 1952)
- November 9 – Mae Marsh, American film actress (d. 1968)
- November 13 – Nita Naldi, American film actress (d. 1961)
- November 14 – Rino Corso Fougier, Italian air force general (d. 1963)
- November 19
  - Wacław Stachiewicz, Polish writer, geologist and general (d. 1973)
  - Américo Tomás, 13th President of Portugal (d. 1987)
- November 21
  - Corinne Griffith, American actress, author (d. 1979)
  - Cecil M. Harden, American politician (d. 1984)
- November 23 – Hardit Malik, Indian fighter pilot and diplomat (d. 1985)
- November 24 – Herbert Sutcliffe, English cricketer (d. 1978)
- November 26 – Norbert Wiener, American mathematician (d. 1964)
- November 27 – Konosuke Matsushita, Japanese industrialist (d. 1989)
- November 29 – Lucille Hegamin, American singer, entertainer (d. 1970)
- December 4 – T. V. Soong, Premier of the Republic of China (d. 1971)
- December 5 – C. R. Swart, 1st State President of South Africa (d. 1982)
- December 8
  - E. C. Segar, American cartoonist, creator of Popeye (d. 1938)
  - James Thurber, American cartoonist, writer (d. 1961)
  - Florbela Espanca, Portuguese poet (d. 1930)
- December 10
  - Edward Milford, Australian general (d. 1972)
  - Philip Drinker, American hygienist and inventor of the iron lung (d. 1972)
- December 15 – Felix Stump, American admiral (d. 1972)
- December 17
  - Arthur Fiedler, American conductor (d. 1979)
  - Willem Schermerhorn, 28th Prime Minister of the Netherlands (d. 1977)
- December 20 – Sir Robert Menzies, 12th Prime Minister of Australia (d. 1978)
- December 22 – Edwin Linkomies, Prime Minister of Finland (d. 1963)
- December 23 – Arthur Gilligan, English cricket captain (d. 1976)
- December 24 – Georges Guynemer, French World War I fighter ace (d. 1917)
- December 26 – Jean Toomer, American poet (d. 1967)

=== Date unknown ===
- Shah Abdul Wahhab, Bangladeshi Islamic scholar (d. 1982)

== Deaths ==
=== January–June ===
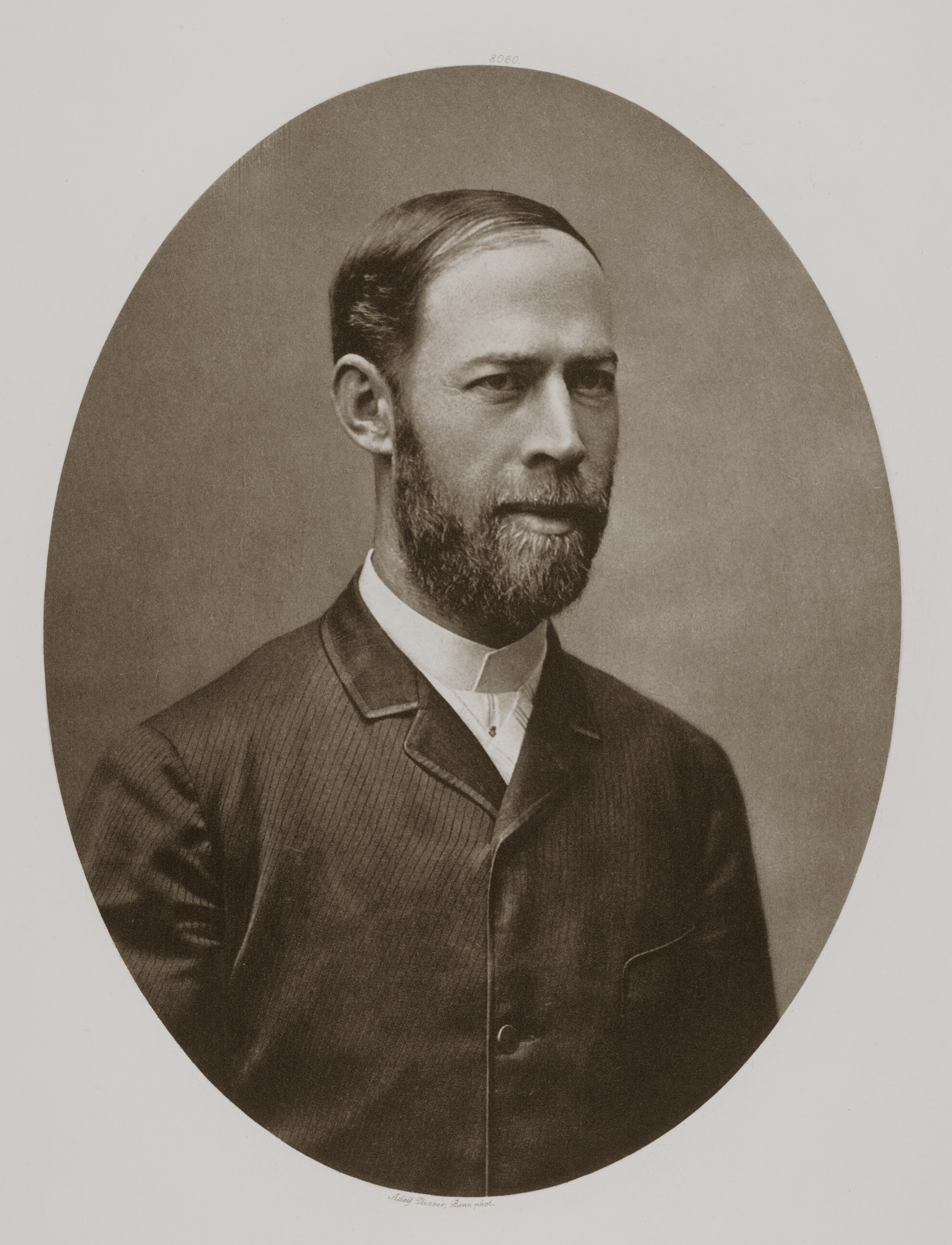
Heinrich Hertz

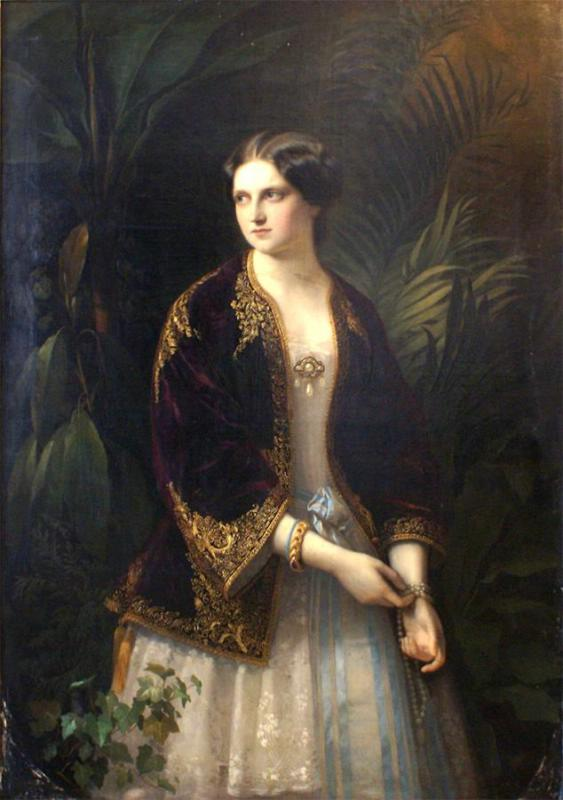
Grand Duchess Catherine Mikhailovna of Russia

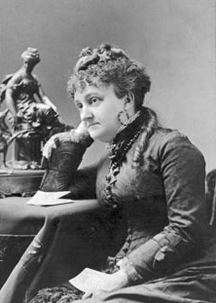
Myra Bradwell

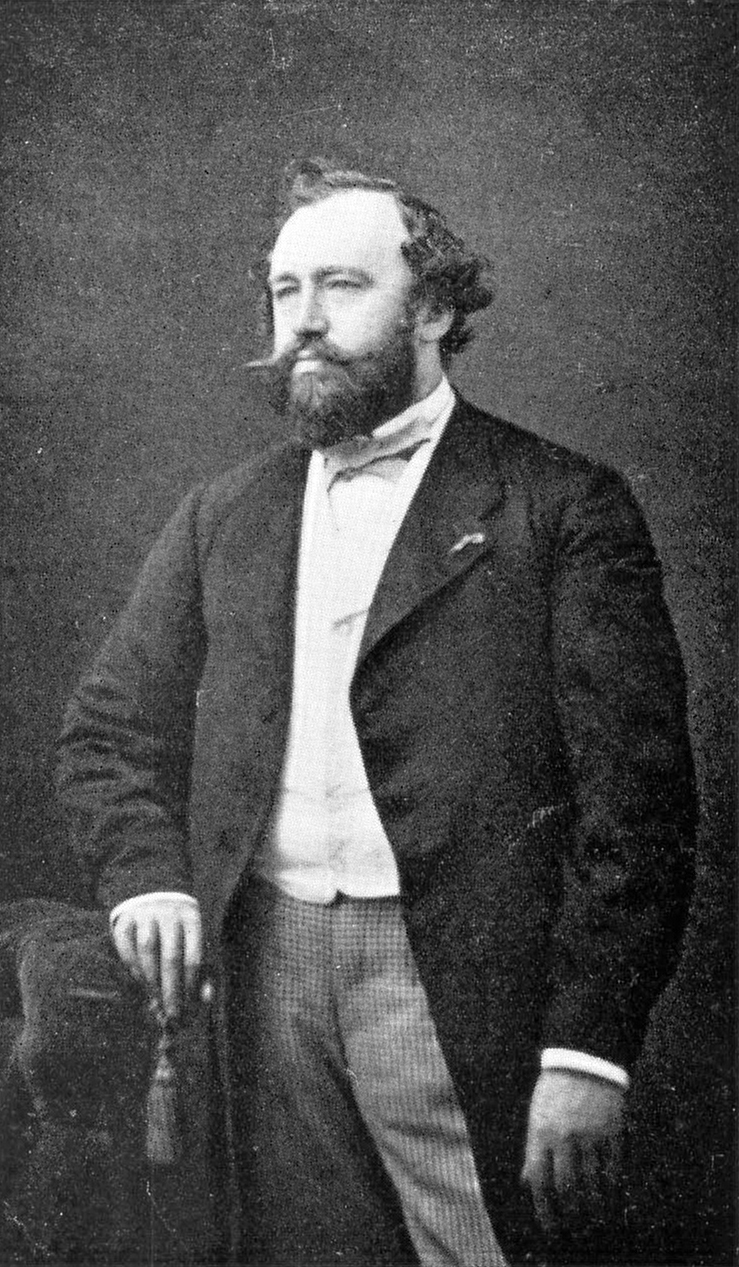
Adolphe Sax

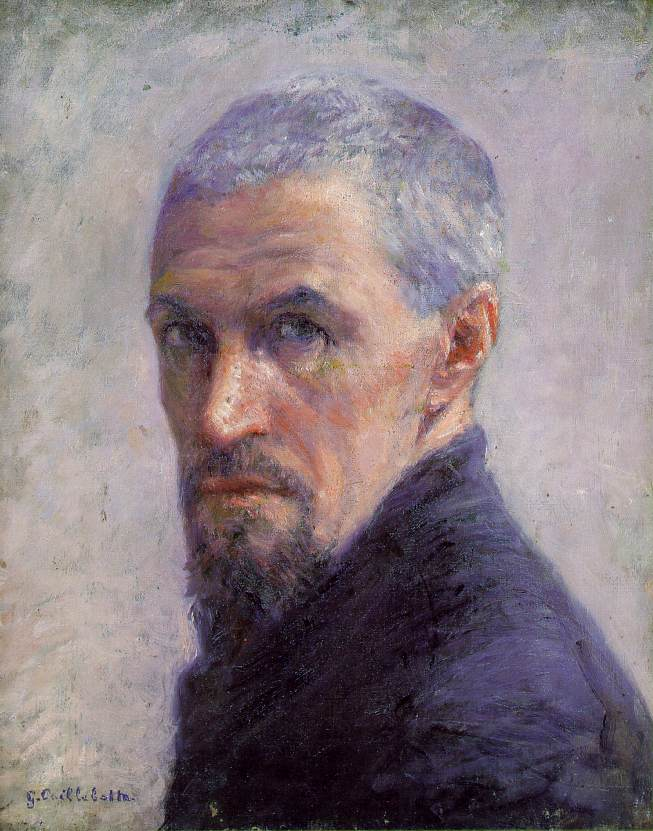
Gustave Caillebotte

- January 1 – Heinrich Hertz, German physicist (b. 1857)
- January 13 – Nadezhda von Meck, Russian patron of Peter Tchaikovsky (b. 1831)
- January 20 – Robert Halpin, Irish mariner and transoceanic cable layer (b. 1836)
- January 28 – Elise Hwasser, Swedish actress (b. 1831)
- February 4 – Adolphe Sax, Belgian instrument maker, inventor of the saxophone (b. 1814)
- February 5 – Auguste Vaillant, French anarchist (b. 1861) (executed)
- February 6 – Maria Deraismes, French feminist (b. 1828)
- February 8 – Robert Michael Ballantyne, Scottish novelist (b. 1825)
- February 12 – Hans von Bülow, German conductor, pianist and composer (b. 1830)
- February 14
  - Myra Bradwell, American lawyer, political activist, (b. 1831)
  - Eugène Charles Catalan, French and Belgian mathematician (b. 1814)
- February 15 – May Brookyn, American actress (b. 1854/1859)
- February 21 – Gustave Caillebotte, French painter (b. 1848)
- February 27
  - Hilarión Daza, President of Bolivia (assassinated) (b. 1840)
  - Carl Schmidt, Baltic German chemist (b. 1822)
- March 2
  - Jubal Early, American Confederate general (b. 1816)
  - William H. Osborn, American railroad executive (b. 1820)
- March 3 – Ned Williamson, American baseball player (b. 1857)
- March 14 – John T. Ford, American theater manager (b. 1829)
- March 20 – Lajos Kossuth, Hungarian politician (b. 1802)
- March 30 – Jane Goodwin Austin, American popular story writer (b. 1831)
- April 1 – Remigio Morales Bermúdez, 19th President of Peru (b. 1836)
- April 8 – Bankim Chandra Chatterjee, Bengali poet (b. 1838)
- May 12 – Grand Duchess Catherine Mikhailovna of Russia, granddaughter of Tsar Paul I (b. 1827)
- May 19 – Caroline Mehitable Fisher Sawyer, American biographier (b. 1812)
- June 3 – Karl Eduard Zachariae von Lingenthal, German jurist, expert on Byzantine law (b. 1812)
- June 7 – King Hassan I of Morocco (b. 1836)
- June 8 –William M. Dalton, American Old West outlaw (b. 1866)
- June 23
  - Marietta Alboni, Italian opera singer (b. 1826)
  - Władysław Czartoryski, Polish political activist and art collector (b. 1828)
- July 24 – George Peter Alexander Healy, American portrait painter (b. 1813)
- June 25
  - Marie François Sadi Carnot, French statesman (assassinated) (b. 1837)
  - Charles Romley Alder Wright, British chemist who synthesized heroin (b. 1844)
- June 27 – Giorgio Costantino Schinas, Maltese architect and civil engineer (b. 1834)

=== July–December ===
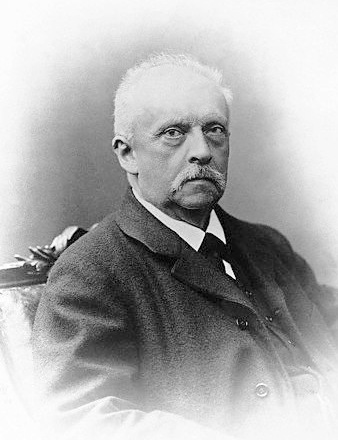
Hermann von Helmholtz

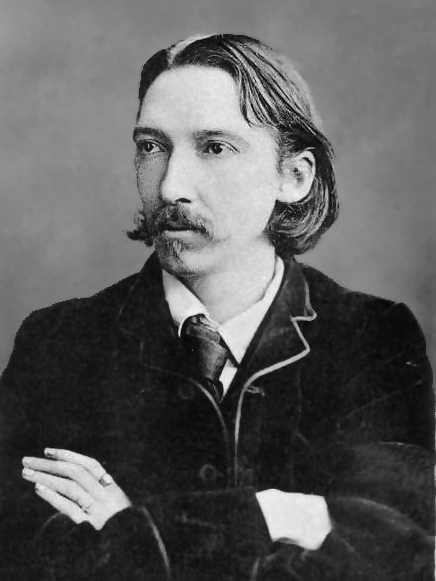
Robert Louis Stevenson

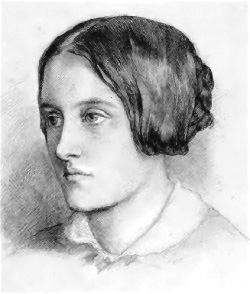
Christina Rossetti

- July 1 – Julius van Zuylen van Nijevelt, Prime Minister of the Netherlands (b. 1819)
- July 3 – Paul Lecreux, French sculptor (b. c. 1826)
- July 22 – Julius von Bose, Prussian general (b. 1809)
- July 30 – Walter Pater, English essayist, critic (b. 1839)
- August 1 – Joseph Holt, Union Army general (b. 1807)
- August 10 – Cynthia Roberts Gorton, blind American poet and author (b. 1826)
- September 1 – Nathaniel P. Banks, American politician, general (b. 1816)
- September 3 – Josiah Parsons Cooke, American scientist (b. 1827)
- September 8 – Hermann von Helmholtz, German physician, physicist (b. 1821)
- September 13 – Emmanuel Chabrier, French composer (b. 1841)
- September 24 – Mary Jane Patterson, first African-American woman to receive a B.A degree in 1862. (b. 1840)
- October 7 – Oliver Wendell Holmes Sr., American author (b. 1809)
- October 9 – Henry Grey, 3rd Earl Grey, British politician (b. 1802)
- October 10 – William Robinson (Canadian architect), Canadian architect and land surveyor (b. 1812)
- October 20 – James Anthony Froude, English historian (b. 1818)
- October 22 – Gillis Bildt, 5th Prime Minister of Sweden (b. 1820)
- October 25 – Mary Brayton Woodbridge, American temperance reformer and newspaper editor (b. 1830)
- October 30 – Juan Cortina, Mexican folk hero (b. 1824)
- November 1 – Emperor Alexander III of Russia (b. 1845)
- November 20 – Anton Rubinstein, Russian pianist, composer (b. 1829)
- November 25 – Solomon Caesar Malan, Swiss-born orientalist (b. 1812)
- November 29 – Juan N. Méndez, interim President of Mexico from 1876 to 1877. (b. 1820)
- December 3 – Robert Louis Stevenson, Scottish author (b. 1850)
- December 8 – Pafnuty Chebyshev, Russian mathematician (b. 1821)
- December 9 – Mary Bell Smith, American educator, social reformer and writer (b. 1818)
- December 12 – Sir John Thompson, 4th Prime Minister of Canada (b. 1845)
- December 28 – Chamarajendra Wadiyar X, Maharajah of Mysore (b. 1863)
- December 29 – Christina Rossetti, English poet (b. 1830)

== Sources ==
- American Annual Cyclopedia...1894 (1895) online
