= Harper Prize =

American literary award

The Harper Prize was an award introduced in 1923 by Harper & Brothers, an American publishing company located in New York City.

The award was presented to the best novel by an "a writer who hitherto had not found a wide audience". A number of the awarded books won the Pulitzer Prize for Fiction, and many were adapted into films.

The first winner of the prize in 1923 was Margaret Wilson, who won the Pulitzer Prize the following year.

== Winners ==
Winners of the Harper Prize included:

- 1922–1923: Margaret Wilson, The Able McLaughlins
- 1925: Anne Parrish, The Perennial Bachelor
- 1927: Glenway Wescott, The Grandmothers: A Family Portrait
- 1929: Julien Green, Leviathan
- 1931: Robert Raynolds, Brothers in the West
- 1933: Paul Horgan, The Fault of Angels
- 1935: Harold Lenoir Davis, Honey in the Horn
- 1937: Frederic Prokosch, The Seven Who Fled
- 1939: Vardis Fisher, Children of God
- 1941: Judith Kelly, Marriage Is a Private Affair
- 1943: Martin Flavin, Journey in the Dark
- 1945: Jo Sinclair, Wasteland
- 1947: Joseph Hitrec, Son of the Moon
- 1949: Max Steele, Debby
- 1955: Don Mankiewicz, Trial
- 1957: Frank Norris, Tower in the West
- 1959: Robin White, Elephant Hill
- 1961: Herbert Lobsenz, Vangel Griffin
- 1963: Richard McKenna, The Sand Pebbles
- 1965: C. D. B. Bryan, P.S. Wilkinson

== See also ==
- List of American literary awards
