= Penitentiary (1938 film) =

1938 film by John Brahm

- Theatrical release poster
- Directed by: John Brahm
- Screenplay by: Seton I. Miller; Fred Niblo, Jr.
- Based on: the play The Criminal Code by Martin Flavin
- Produced by: Robert North
- Starring: Walter Connolly; John Howard; Jean Parker; Robert Barrat
- Cinematography: Lucien Ballard
- Edited by: Viola Lawrence
- Music by: Morris Stoloff
- Distributed by: Columbia Pictures
- Release date: January 17, 1938 (United States)
- Running time: 79 minutes
- Country: United States
- Language: English

Penitentiary is a 1938 American crime film directed by John Brahm starring Walter Connolly, John Howard, Jean Parker and Robert Barrat. It was the second Columbia Pictures film adaptation of the 1929 stage play The Criminal Code by Martin Flavin, after Howard Hawk's The Criminal Code (1931) and followed by Henry Levin's Convicted (1950).

== Plot ==
William Jordan is befriended by the man who sent him to prison on a manslaughter charge, former DA (District attorney) now prison warden Matthews. In order to give Jordan the opportunity to rehabilitate himself Matthews allows him to work as chauffeur to his daughter Elizabeth, though he's a bit uncomfortable when Elizabeth falls in love with the young convict. All of this extra effort goes out the window when Jordan, adhering to the "criminal code" of never snitching on a fellow con, allows himself to be implicated in the murder of another convict. Jordan is saved from the death penalty by a last-minute confession of his hard-bitten but honorable cellmate.

== Cast ==
- Walter Connolly as Thomas Matthews
- John Howard as William Jordan
- Jean Parker as Elizabeth Matthews
- Robert Barrat as Captain Grady
- Marc Lawrence as Jack Hawkins
- Arthur Hohl as Finch
- Dick Curtis as Tex
- Paul Fix as Runch
- Marjorie Main as Katie Matthews
- Edward Van Sloan as Dr. Rinewulf
- Ann Doran as Blanche Williams
- Dick Elliott as McNaulty
- Charles Halton as Leonard Nettleford
- Thurston Hall as Judge
- Ward Bond as Red, prison barber
- John Gallaudet as State Attorney
- Stanley Andrews as Captain Dorn
- James Flavin as Doran
- Bruce Mitchell as Bailiff
- George Magrill as Richard
