= Martin Flavin =

American dramatist

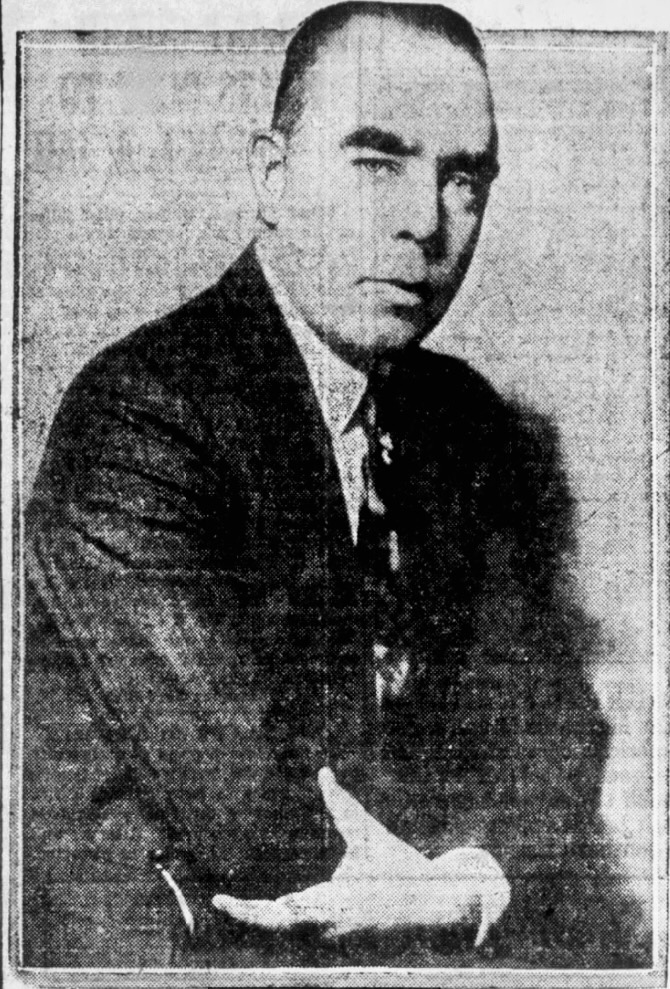
- Flavin in 1923
- Born: Martin Archer Flavin; November 2, 1883; San Francisco, California, U.S.
- Died: December 2, 1967 (aged 84); Carmel-by-the-Sea, California, U.S.
- Education: University of Chicago
- Occupations: playwright and novelist
- Spouse(s): Daphne Springer (1914); Sarah Keese Arnold (1919); Cornelia Clampett (1949)
- Relatives: Lawrence Archer (maternal grandfather)

Martin Archer Flavin (November 2, 1883 – December 27, 1967) was an American playwright and novelist. His novel Journey in the Dark received both the Harper Prize for 1943 and a Pulitzer Prize for 1944. His play The Criminal Code was produced on Broadway in 1929, and it was the basis for the movie The Criminal Code. He had eleven plays on Broadway between 1923 and 1937.

== Early life ==
Flavin was born on November 2, 1883, in San Francisco, California, to Martin J. Flavin and Louise Ann Archer. He grew up in Chicago and was a Sigma Chi at the University of Chicago, which he attended from 1903 to 1905.

He was a U.S. Army Cavalryman during World War I, and he enjoyed riding horses for most of his life. Flavin was married three times: to Daphne Virginia Springer on November 14, 1914, in Joliet, Illinois, Sarah Keese Arnold in 1919, and Cornelia Clampett in 1949. He had three children.

== Career ==
"Weaves charming plays and plays charmingly with his family of clever children in his palatial home on the edge of the sea."

— Carmel Pine Cone

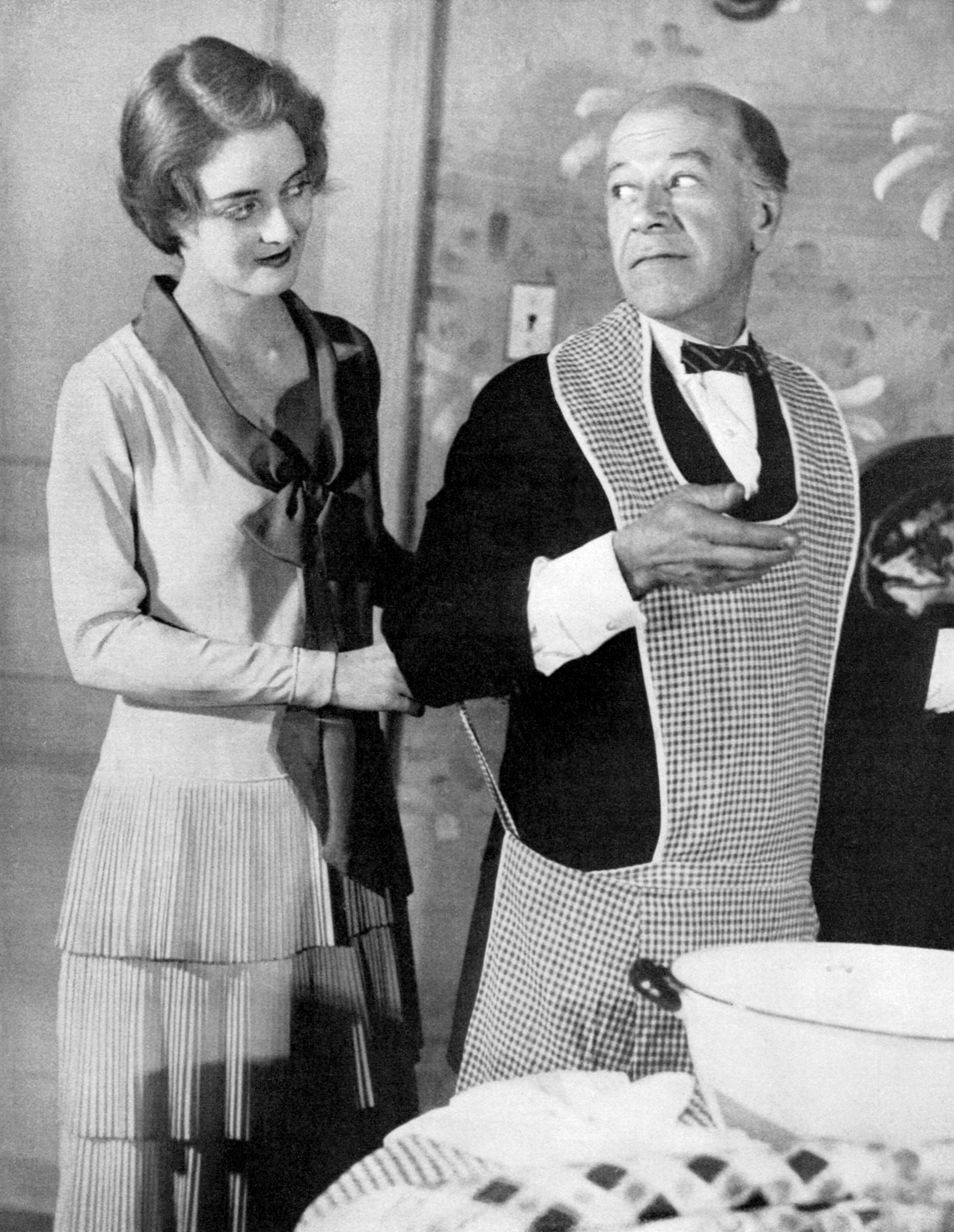
Bette Davis and Donald Meek in the original Broadway production of Broken Dishes (1929)

Flavin left college to work as a reporter on a Chicago newspaper. He then took over the family's business called the American Wallpaper Company. He wrote plays while working there.

He moved to Carmel-by-the-Sea, California, in the 1920s. He and playwrights Perry Newberry, and Ira Remsen produced original dramas at the Carmel Arts and Crafts Club theater at that time.

Flavin then won a Harper Prize for his play The Criminal Code. By 1929, he had three plays running on Broadway. He wrote the novel Journey in the Dark, which received both the Harper Prize in 1943 and a Pulitzer Prize in 1944. He was the oldest writer to win the $10,000 Harper prize. Other novels included Mr. Littlejohn (1940), Corporal Cat (1941), The Enchanted (1947), Cameron Hill (1957), Black and White (1950), and Red Poppies and White Marble (1962).

Flavin's play Broken Dishes (1929) was the basis of several screen adaptations. It was adapted into the 1931 film Too Young to Marry, the 1936 film Love Begins at 20, and the 1940 film Calling All Husbands. It was also adapted for television as a 1951 episode of Pulitzer Prize Playhouse.

Flavin moved to Carmel Highlands during the Great Depression to build a home on Yankee Point south of Point Lobos. He also owned a 1,300 acres (530 ha) ranch in the Cachagua area in upper Carmel Valley, California.

== Death ==
Flavin died at the Carmel Community Hospital on December 27, 1967, in Carmel-by-the-Sea at age 84.

== Novels ==
- Mr. Littlejohn (1940)
- Corporal Cat (1941)
- Journey in the Dark (1943)
- The Enchanted (1947)
- Cameron Hill (1957)

== Non-fiction ==
- Black and White: From the Cape to the Congo (1950)
- Red Poppies and White Marble (1962)

== Plays ==
- Children of the Moon (1923, produced on Broadway 1923)
- Emergency Case (1923)
- Caleb Stone's Death Watch (1923, produced on Broadway 1924)
- Achilles Had a Heel (1924, produced on Broadway 1935)
- Lady of the Rose (1925, produced on Broadway 1925)
- Service for Two (1926, produced on Broadway 1926)
- Brains (1926, produced on Broadway 1926)
- The Criminal Code (1929, produced on Broadway 1929), the basis for several motion pictures: Columbia Pictures' The Criminal Code (1931) and the Spanish-language version El Código penal, shot simultaneously on the same sets;, the 1933 French film Criminal; and two Columbia Pictures remakes, Penitentiary (1938) and Convicted (1950).
- Broken Dishes (1929, produced on Broadway 1929)
- Crossroads (1929, produced on Broadway 1929), the basis for the 1932 motion picture The Age of Consent
- Tapestry in Gray (1935, produced on Broadway 1935)
- Around the Corner (1936, produced on Broadway 1936)
- Blue Jeans (1937)

== Screenplays ==
- The Big House (1930, additional dialogue)
- Passion Flower (1930, adaptation of novel by Kathleen Norris)
- Laughing Sinners (1931, dialogue, uncredited, a.k.a. Complete Surrender)
- Three Who Loved (1931)
