= Convicted (1950 film) =

1950 film by Henry Levin

- Theatrical release poster
- Directed by: Henry Levin
- Screenplay by: William Bowers; Fred Niblo, Jr. Seton I. Miller
- Based on: The Criminal Code; 1929 play by Martin Flavin
- Produced by: Jerry Bresler
- Starring: Glenn Ford; Broderick Crawford; Millard Mitchell; Dorothy Malone; Carl Benton Reid; Frank Faylen; Will Geer
- Cinematography: Burnett Guffey
- Edited by: Al Clark
- Music by: George Duning
- Color process: Black and white
- Production company: Columbia Pictures
- Distributed by: Columbia Pictures
- Release date: August 1950 (United States)
- Running time: 91 minutes
- Country: United States
- Language: English

Convicted is a 1950 American crime film noir directed by Henry Levin and starring Glenn Ford and Broderick Crawford. It was the third Columbia Pictures film adaptation of the 1929 stage play The Criminal Code by Martin Flavin, following Howard Hawks's The Criminal Code (1931) and John Brahm's Penitentiary (1938).

== Plot ==
A man named Joe Hufford is arrested after a fistfight in which another man is killed. District attorney George Knowland knows that Hufford did not intend to kill the man and offers his attorney a viable line of defense, but the attorney refuses to listen and Hufford is convicted of manslaughter and sentenced to prison.

Several years into Hufford's sentence, Knowland is appointed as the prison's new warden and gives Hufford a highly desirable job as his personal chauffeur, which mostly involves driving Knowland's daughter Kay around town. Hufford dreams of a life with Kay, who has become his greatest advocate.

Following a failed escape attempt by other inmates, an informant is killed in Knowland's office by Hufford's cellmate Malloby. Knowland finds Hufford at the scene of the crime and presses Hufford to reveal the identity of the killer, but prison has made Hufford a hard man and he is unwilling to squeal on a fellow inmate. Knowland dangles the promise of parole in front of Hufford, but he refuses to talk and is banished to solitary confinement.

Despite Hufford's silence, Knowland works to secure his release, and Hufford is paroled.

== Cast ==
- Glenn Ford as Joe Hufford
- Broderick Crawford as George Knowland
- Millard Mitchell as Malloby
- Dorothy Malone as Kay Knowland
- Carl Benton Reid as Captain Douglas
- Frank Faylen as Convict Ponti
- Will Geer as Convict Mapes
- Martha Stewart as Bertha "Bertie" Williams, aka Yvonne Adair
- Henry O'Neill as Detective Dorn
- Douglas Kennedy as Det. Bailey
- Roland Winters as Vernon Bradley, Attorney
- Ed Begley as Mackay – Head of Parole Board
- John Doucette as Tex - Convict (uncredited)
- Ray Teal as Cell Block / Yard Guard (uncredited)
- James Millican as Guard in Kitchen (uncredited)
- Whit Bissell as State's Attorney Owens (uncredited)

== Reception ==
In a contemporary review, critic John L. Scott of the Los Angeles Times wrote: "The character personnel is uniformly good. Ford brings out the grim aspects of a chap trapped by circumstances. Crawford has a more sympathetic role than usual."

Marjory Adams of The Boston Globe called Convicted "a more convincing prison drama than one usually sees, with an intelligent plot, especially good characterization, and some fine prison detail."

Variety wrote: "Convicted isn't quite as grim a prison film as the title would indicate. It has several off-beat twists to its development, keeping it from being routine. While plotting is essentially a masculine soap opera, scripting [from a play by Martin Flavin] supplies plenty of polish and good dialog to see it through."
