= Criminal (1933 film) =

1933 film

- Directed by: Jack Forrester
- Written by: Jean-José Frappa; Seton I. Miller; Fred Niblo Jr.
- Based on: The Criminal Code by Martin Flavin
- Produced by: Jack Forrester; André Parant
- Starring: Harry Baur; Pierre Alcover; Jean Servais
- Cinematography: Enzo Riccioni
- Edited by: Jean Decan
- Music by: H. de Bozy
- Production company: Forrester-Parant Productions
- Release date: 6 January 1933
- Running time: 110 minutes
- Country: France
- Language: French

Criminal (French: Criminel) is a 1933 French drama film directed by Jack Forrester and starring Harry Baur, Pierre Alcover and Jean Servais. It is a remake of the 1930 America film The Criminal Code by Howard Hawks, itself based on a 1929 play of the same title by Martin Flavin.

== Cast ==
- Harry Baur as Warden Brady
- Pierre Alcover as Le gardien chef
- Jean Servais as Bob Graham
- Hélène Perdrière as Mary Brody
- Daniel Mendaille as Galloway
- Pauline Carton
- Alfred Argus
- Léon Arvel
- Armand Caratis
- Alberte Gallé
- Jean Gaubens
- Monique Joyce
- François Viguier

== Bibliography ==
- Goble, Alan. The Complete Index to Literary Sources in Film. Walter de Gruyter, 1999.
