= The Criminal Code =

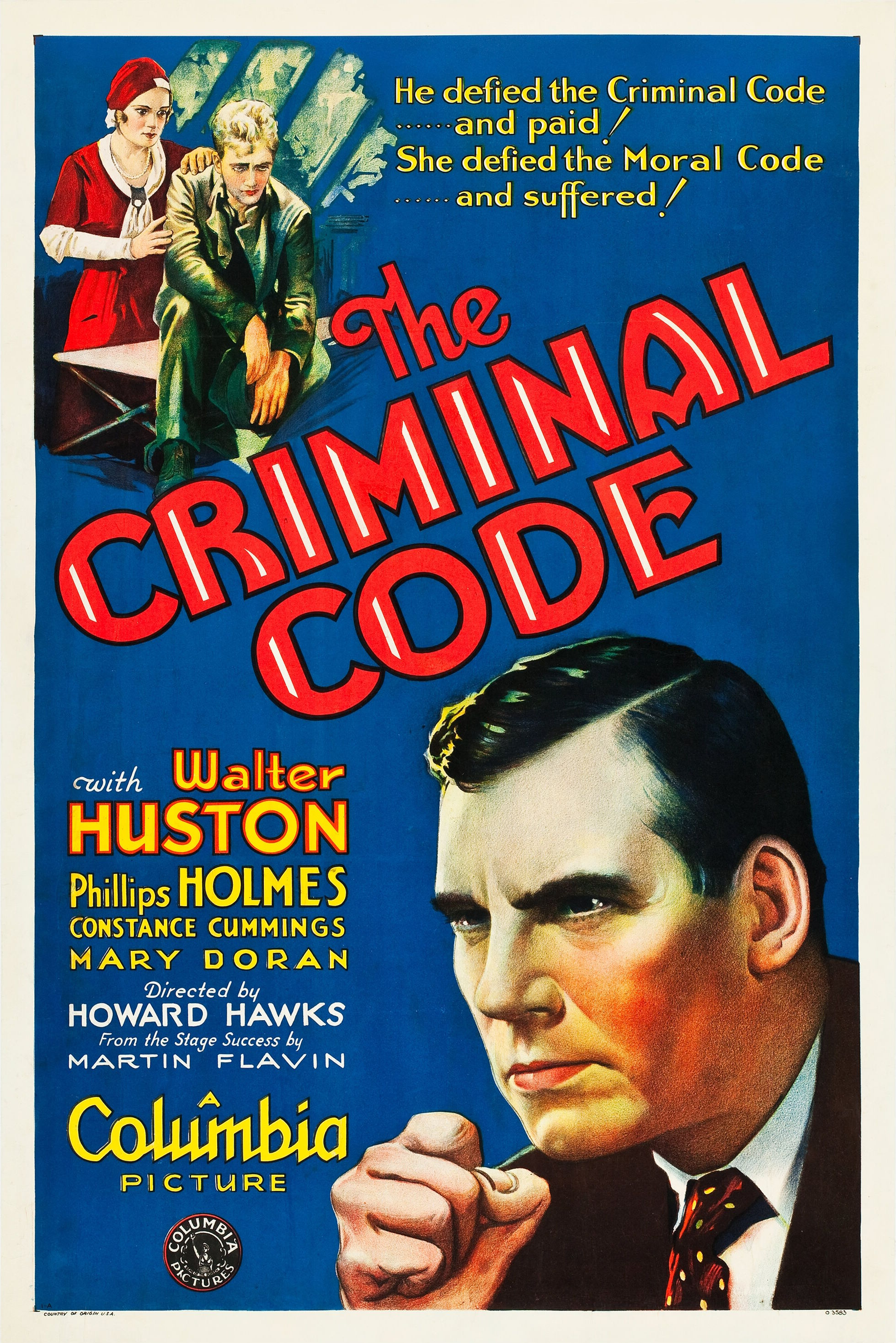
- Theatrical release poster
- Directed by: Howard Hawks
- Screenplay by: Fred Niblo Jr. Seton I. Miller
- Based on: The Criminal Code; 1929 play by Martin Flavin
- Produced by: Harry Cohn; Frank Fouce
- Starring: Walter Huston; Phillips Holmes; Constance Cummings; Boris Karloff
- Cinematography: James Wong Howe (as James How); Ted Tetzlaff
- Edited by: Edward Curtiss
- Color process: Black and white
- Production company: Columbia Pictures
- Distributed by: Columbia Pictures
- Release date: January 4, 1931 (New York)
- Running time: 96 minutes
- Country: United States
- Language: English

The Criminal Code is a 1931 American pre-Code romantic crime drama film directed by Howard Hawks and starring Walter Huston and Phillips Holmes. The screenplay, based on a 1929 play of the same name by Martin Flavin, was written by Fred Niblo Jr. and Seton I. Miller, who were nominated for Best Adaptation at the 4th Academy Awards. The film is the first of three film adaptations of the play released by Columbia Pictures. It was followed by Penitentiary (1938) and Convicted (1950).

== Plot ==
The Criminal Code

In the film, Robert Graham, convicted of manslaughter after a drunken brawl, underwent 6 years of hard labor in the prison jute mill, which changed Graham from a polite man into a hardened convict. Mark Brady, the former district attorney who had prosecuted Graham and many of the men in the prison, becomes the warden and the prisoners stage a loud but nonviolent protest. Brady desires to become the state's governor following his term as warden.

The penitentiary's doctor recommends that Graham be offered a change of duties before psychological damage becomes irreversible. Brady assigns Graham to become his valet. Graham enjoys the change, especially the company of the warden's pretty young daughter Mary.

One of Graham's cellmates tries to escape with two others, but one of them is a stool pigeon who inadvertently discloses the plan to prison authorities, and the escape is a fiasco in which a guard kills a prisoner. Ned Galloway, Graham's other cellmate, finds the informer in the prison office and murders him. Although Graham is discovered in the office when Brady discovers the crime, Brady believes that Graham is not the culprit but knows the murderer's identity. Promising Graham parole, Brady and the cruel guard Captain Gleason aggressively demand the name of the killer, but Graham remains loyal to the prisoners' code of silence and will not betray Galloway. Brady sends him to "the hole", hoping that solitary confinement will convince Graham to change his mind.

Mary returns from a trip and is shocked to learn that Graham has been punished. She proclaims her love for him and urges Brady to release him. Brady's love for his daughter causes him to pledge that he will try to secure Graham's release. Galloway, grateful that Graham has not betrayed him, intentionally causes himself to be sent to the hole in order to protect Graham by killing Gleason, against whom he had a longstanding grudge.

== Cast ==
- Walter Huston as Mark Brady
- Phillips Holmes as Robert Graham
- Constance Cummings as Mary Brady
- Boris Karloff as Ned Galloway
- DeWitt Jennings as Yard Captain Gleason
- Mary Doran as Gertrude Williams
- Ethel Wales as Katie Ryan
- Clark Marshall as Runch
- Arthur Hoyt as Leonard Nettleford
- John St. Polis as Dr Rinewulf
- Paul Porcasi as Tony Spelvin
- Otto Hoffman as Jim Fales
- John Sheehan as McManus

== Production ==
The story was adapted for the screen by Seton I. Miller and Fred Niblo Jr., son of director Fred Niblo. Director Howard Hawks had worked with Miller several times in the late 1920s and early 1930s. The original play by American playwright Martin Flavin was produced on Broadway in 1929 at the Belasco Theater. Boris Karloff, who delivered a strong performance as Galloway in the stage play, was cast in the same role for the film, which accelerated his career.

The Criminal Code was the first of Hawks' four collaborations with Harry Cohn, preceding Twentieth Century (1934), Only Angels Have Wings (1939) and His Girl Friday (1940).

Stock footage from the film was recycled by Columbia for Behind the Mask (1932), another film featuring Constance Cummings and Karloff.

Although The Criminal Code is an early sound film, it has been noted for its sophisticated use of sound. Hawks' direction yielded dialogue that is at times rapid and often overlaps.

== Reception ==
In a contemporary review for The New York Times, critic Mordaunt Hall wrote: "Granted that Howard Hawks's direction is for the most part intelligent and firm, there are occasional sequences which he spoils by extravagant ideas or by leaving too little to the imagination. Mr. Hawks would have done well to govern his whole production by the fine example of restraint set by Mr. Huston."

== Adaptations ==
=== Radio ===
The Criminal Code was presented on Philip Morris Playhouse on March 2, 1952. The 30-minute adaptation starred Dane Clark and University of Minnesota student Peggy Baskerville.

=== Foreign-language versions ===
A Spanish-language version entitled El código penal was directed by Phil Rosen and stars Barry Norton, María Alba and Carlos Villarías. Its world premiere was held in Mexico City on February 19, 1931, followed by its American opening in San Juan, Puerto Rico on March 14 and the New York opening on April 14, 1931.

A French version entitled Criminel was produced in 1932 by Forrester-Parant Productions and directed by Jack Forrester. It stars Harry Baur and Jean Servais and uses certain scenes from the English-language version.

=== Remakes ===
Columbia Pictures remade the picture as Penitentiary (1938), directed by John Brahm and starring Walter Connolly and John Howard, and as Convicted (1950), directed by Henry Levin and starring Glenn Ford and Broderick Crawford.
