= The Able McLaughlins =

1923 novel by Margaret Wilson

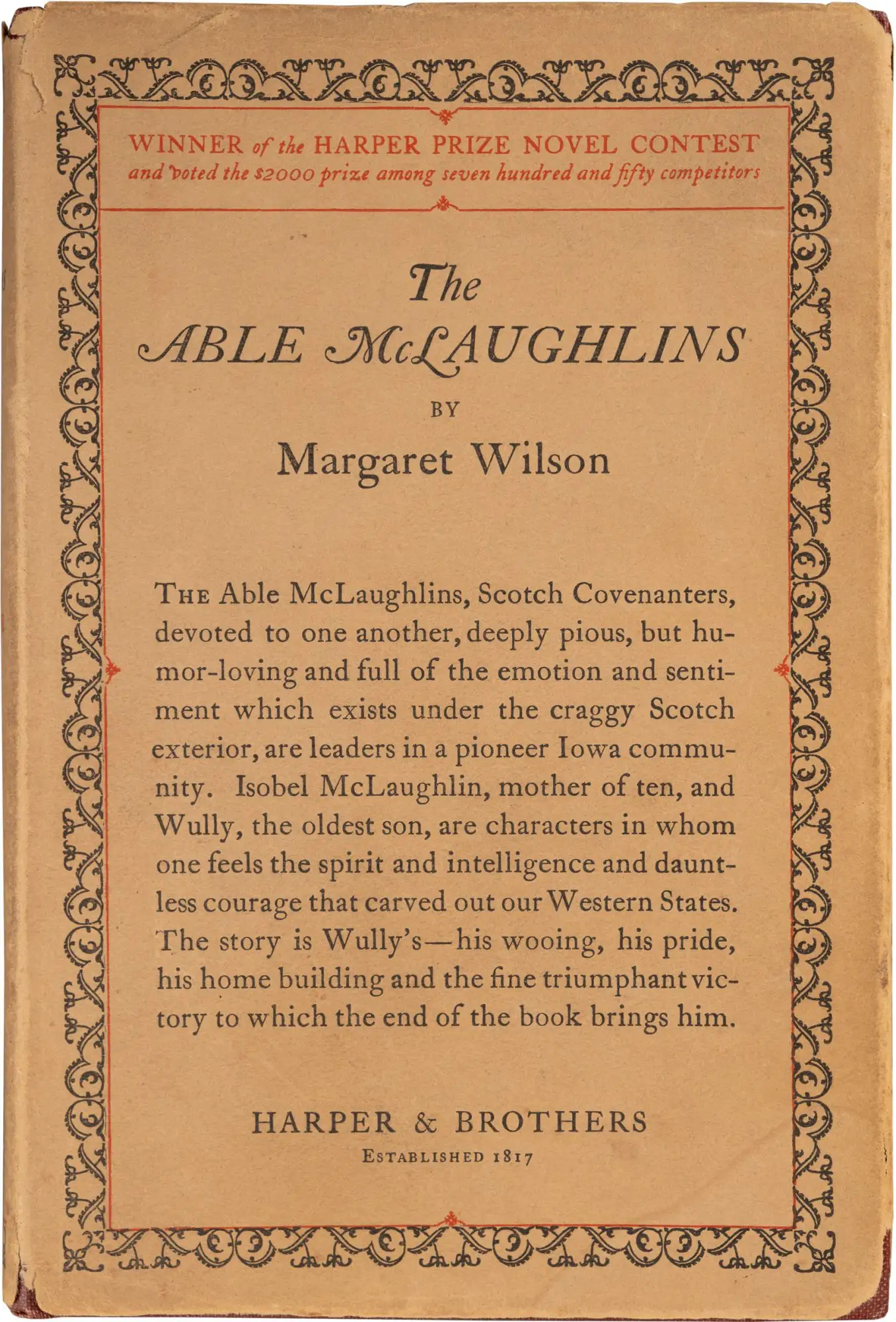
- Cover of the first edition
- Author: Margaret Wilson
- Language: English
- Genre: Historical novels
- Publisher: Harper & Brothers
- Publication date: 1923
- Publication place: United States
- Media type: Print (hardcover)
- Pages: 262
- ISBN: 0-87797-288-5

The Able McLaughlins is a 1923 novel by Margaret Wilson first published by Harper & Brothers. It won the Pulitzer Prize for the Novel in 1924. It won the Harper Prize Novel Contest for 1922-1923, the first time the prize was awarded. Wilson published a sequel, The Law and the McLaughlins, in 1936.

A pre-publication notice described it as "a story of pioneer life in Iowa in Civil War times" focused on "a family of Scotch Covenanters." Some reviews praised the novel but viewed its prize-winning status differently. Allan Nevins called it "remarkable for the unity of impression produced" and added that "the book would win rapid distinction if introduced without its blue ribbon." But the Boston Transcript's reviewer wrote: "The book is so good as a first novel that it is impossible not to regret that it must always be judged as a prize novel." The New York Times was less enthusiastic: "Miss Wilson does quite well with her characters, develops them by phrase and incident. In the mechanics of story-telling she appears less practiced; or, perhaps, more labored. The novel does not always run smoothly from one incident to the next."

Book Review Digest provided a summary:

Wully McLaughlin, doughty but inarticulate young hero, returns from Grant's army to find that his sweetheart, Chirstie McNair, has fallen a victim, against her will, to the scapegrace of the community, Peter Keith. She has concealed her plight from every one, but cannot conceal it from him. Wully grasps the situation with masterful promptness. He makes Peter leave under threat of death, marries Chirstie, and accepts the paternity of her child and the blame for its disgracefully early birth. Peter steals back to see the woman he violated, at a time when the anger of Wully and Chirstie against him has not lost a degree of its incandescence. Wully hunts him with a shotgun, but he has disappeared. Then, a few weeks later, Wully suddenly finds him–and revenge and forgiveness are reconciled in Miss Wilson's last pages with surprising convincingness.

Contrasting with the dramatic story of Wully and Chirstie is that of her father and stepmother, Alex and Barbara, a comedic tale of a wife "who thinks she is coming from Scotland to a castle on the prairie, only to discover she is to have to live in a 'pig's sty' of a house."

In 1936, Time called it "still her most noteworthy book."

Wilson's portrait of this immigrant community has been cited for its folkloric detail, such as the story of Andy McFee, who removed his shoes when not actually walking until "an able grand-daughter-in-law urged him not to misuse shoestrings with such extravagance."
