= The Law and the McLaughlins =

1936 novel by Margaret Wilson

- First UK edition
- Author: Margaret Wilson
- Language: English
- Genre: Novel
- Publisher: Doubleday, Doran & Co. (US); Cassell (UK)
- Publication date: 1936
- Publication place: United States
- Media type: Print (Hardcover)
- Pages: 308

The Law and the McLaughlins is a 1936 novel by Margaret Wilson first published by Doubleday, Doran & Company, Inc. It was a sequel to her earlier Pulitzer-prize winning The Able McLaughlins.

Wilson has modified the names of two of the characters from the first McLaughlin novel, from Wully to Willy and from Christie to Kirstie. The story begins 6 months after the end of the first novel in December 1868. Two men have been found lynched. The story follows the attempts of the community to bring their murderers to justice, intertwined with the stories of Willy and his sister Jean and their reactions to the community's thirst for justice.

Wilson had authored a critique of the American justice system in 1931 called The Crime of Punishment and its concerns inform her second McLaughlin novel. As the settlers contend with punishing vigilantes and establishing a traditional system of justice, the character of Jean represents a feminist and reformer's voice in contrast to "the severity of men's justice."

A lengthy review in The New York Times called it "this almost heroically simple story." It recognized Jean McLaughlin's "beautiful individual portrait" as the crux of the story, with "her peculiar rebellious and romantic way," and called the novel "as fine a study in characterization as one is likely to meet again this season," "a remarkably successful study of a pioneer community and a charming companion piece" to Wilson's first McLaughlin novel. One survey of frontier novels judged it an "inferior" sequel that "does not hold our interest."

== Sources ==
- Clarence A. Andrews, A Literary History of Iowa (University of Iowa Press, 1972)
- Steven R. Serafin and Alfred Bendixen, eds., The Continuum Encyclopedia of American Literature (NY: Continuum Publishing, 1999)
