= Honey in the Horn =

1935 novel by Harold L. Davis

- First edition (publ. Harper & Brothers)
- Author: Harold L. Davis
- Language: English
- Set in: Oregon
- Publisher: Harper & Brothers
- Publication date: 1935
- Publication place: United States
- Text: Honey in the Horn online

Honey in the Horn is a 1935 debut novel by Harold L. Davis. The novel received the Harper Prize for best first novel of 1935 and won the Pulitzer Prize for the Novel in 1936. The title of the book is from a line in a square dancing tune, and is only found in the book in the author's introductory overleaf.

== Synopsis ==
Honey in the Horn is a novel about life in the homesteading days of Oregon, 1906-1908. It is about the coming of age of an orphan boy named Clay Calvert, but it is also about the trials of the pioneers who came to Oregon following the American Dream. Through the characters that Clay meets along the way, the author introduces the readers to the various occupations of the settlers of that era.

== Plot summary ==
In the opening section of the story, Clay Calvert is a hand on the sheep ranch of Preston Shiveley, his stepfather's father. Without really intending to, Clay helps his stepbrother, Wade Shiveley, escape from jail, and becomes a fugitive himself. He and a Tunne Indian boy flee into the wilderness where Clay joins up with a horse-trader who has a beautiful young daughter, Luce.

In the second section of the story, Clay and Luce are married and living in the sparsely populated coastal regions. There they meet with a group of settlers who are planning a trip to eastern Oregon where they can put down stakes. On the trip east, they meet again with Wade Shiveley, who is accusing Clay of stealing his horse. Wade Shiveley is eventually hanged for a crime he did not commit, and Clay is free to move on. Shortly after, Luce falls ill and Clay goes for help. When he returns Luce is gone, apparently with her father.

In the final section of the story, Clay decides not to pursue Luce, but follows the wheat harvest, and eventually ends up as a hand on a scow on the Columbia River. Clay goes back to the Eastern plains to harvest grass for hay where he once again meets the Tunne Indian boy. He later discovers the Indian boy dead and suspects that he was killed by Luce's father. He decides then to rejoin the settlers who had moved from the Coast and stays with them until a harsh winter drives them off of their homesteads. On the way back west Clay once again unites with Luce.

== Characters ==
- Clay Calvert – a boy of 16 whose mother married Wade Shiveley, then died. Clay is then adopted by Wade's father, Uncle Preston.
- Luce – a young girl who is living a gypsy life with her father, a horse trader, and stepmother.
- Wade Shiveley – one of two sons of Preston Shiveley, who kills his own brother in a fight over a squaw and is put in jail. Clay's role in slipping Wade a gun sent from "Uncle Preston" is what sets off the action of the novel.
- Luce's father – a horse trader and notorious gambler
- Uncle Preston Shiveley – the eccentric father of Wade, sheep rancher, and toll-bridge owner who takes Clay in
- Tunne Indian boy – who is also a ward of Uncle Preston and helps Clay escape in to the wilderness
- Clark Burdon – a disfigured and retired gun for hire who was one of the leaders of the caravan west and took a liking to Clay and Luce
- Captain Waller – who owned a scow that ferried cordwood up and down the Columbia River
