= Love Begins at 20 =

1936 film by Frank McDonald

- Directed by: Frank McDonald
- Screenplay by: Dalton Trumbo; Tom Reed
- Based on: Broken Dishes; 1929 play by Martin Flavin
- Produced by: Bryan Foy
- Starring: Hugh Herbert; Patricia Ellis; Warren Hull; Hobart Cavanaugh; Dorothy Vaughan; Clarence Wilson
- Cinematography: George Barnes
- Edited by: Terry O. Morse
- Music by: Howard Jackson
- Production company: Warner Bros. Pictures
- Distributed by: Warner Bros. Pictures
- Release date: August 22, 1936
- Running time: 58 minutes
- Country: United States
- Language: English

Love Begins at 20 is a 1936 American comedy film directed by Frank McDonald and written by Dalton Trumbo and Tom Reed, based on the 1929 play Broken Dishes by Martin Flavin. The film stars Hugh Herbert, Patricia Ellis, Warren Hull, Hobart Cavanaugh, Dorothy Vaughan and Clarence Wilson. The film was released by Warner Bros. Pictures on August 22, 1936.

== Cast ==
- Hugh Herbert as Horatio Gillingwater
- Patricia Ellis as Lois Gillingwater
- Warren Hull as Jerry Wayne
- Hobart Cavanaugh as Jacob 'Jake' Buckley
- Dorothy Vaughan as Evalina 'Evie' Gillingwater
- Clarence Wilson as Jonathan Ramp
- Robert Gleckler as Gangster Mugsy O'Bannion, aka Harold McCauley
- Mary Treen as Alice Gillingwater
- Anne Nagel as Miss Perkins, Ramp's Secretary
- Arthur Aylesworth as Justice Felton
- Sol Gorss as Jim, a Bank Robber
- Henry Otho as Lumpy, a Bank Robber
- Max Wagner as Lester, O'Bannion's Driver
- Tom Brower as Sheriff Bert Hanson
- Milton Kibbee as Wilbur, Detective
- Tom Wilson as Fred
