= Journey in the Dark =

1943 novel by Martin Flavin

- First edition cover (Harper & Brothers)
- Author: Martin Flavin
- Language: English
- Publication date: 1943

Journey in the Dark is a 1943 novel by Martin Flavin. It won both the 1943 Harper Prize and the 1944 Pulitzer Prize, and was printed as an Armed Services Edition. The New York Times called the book "a story of a boy from Iowa who becomes a business tycoon at the price of his integrity.”
