= H. L. Davis =

American novelist

Harold Lenoir Davis
- Born: October 18, 1894; Douglas County, Oregon, U.S.
- Died: October 31, 1960 (aged 66); San Antonio, Texas, U.S.
- Writing career
- Notable work: Honey in the Horn
- Notable awards: Pulitzer Prize; Guggenheim Fellowship

Harold Lenoir Davis (October 18, 1894 – October 31, 1960), also known as H. L. Davis, was an American novelist and poet. A native of Oregon, he won the Pulitzer Prize for his novel Honey in the Horn, the only Pulitzer Prize for Literature given to a native Oregonian. Later living in California and Texas, he also wrote short stories for magazines such as The Saturday Evening Post.

== Early life ==
Davis was born in Nonpareil, Douglas County, Oregon, in the Umpqua River Valley, and lived in Roseburg in his early years. His father was a teacher and the family moved frequently as he took up different teaching positions. They moved to Antelope, Oregon in 1906, and two years later they were in The Dalles, where his father was now a principal. In 1912 Davis graduated from high school there. He held various short-term jobs, with the county, with Pacific Power and Light, and in a local bank. He also worked as a railroad timekeeper and with a survey party near Mount Adams.

== Writing career ==
His first poems were published in April 1919 in Poetry, edited by Harriet Monroe. These were eleven poems published together under the title Primapara. Later that year they won the magazine's Levinson Prize, worth $200. Davis also received a letter of praise from poet Carl Sandburg. Davis continued to publish poems in the magazine throughout the 1920s, and also sold some poems to H. L. Mencken's The American Mercury. Mencken encouraged him to begin writing prose.

In 1926, Davis and James Stevens privately published a small booklet, Status Rerum: A Manifesto Upon the Present Condition of Northwest Literature. Although only a few copies were printed, the booklet attracted notice because of its bluntness and invective against the local literary scene of Portland. Robinson Jeffers memorably described the pamphlet as a "rather grimly powerful wheel to break butterflies on."

Together with his new wife, the former Marion Lay of The Dalles, Davis moved to Seattle in August 1928. There he increased his literary efforts. His first published prose began appearing in The American Mercury in 1929. These were picturesque but hardly complimentary sketches of The Dalles and Eastern Oregon. One of the first was entitled "A Town in Eastern Oregon", a historical sketch of The Dalles. It caused quite a controversy in the region for its irreverence.

In 1932, Davis was awarded a Guggenheim Fellowship. The award allowed him to move to Jalisco, Mexico, where he lived for two years, concentrating on his writing. There he completed the novel Honey in the Horn, about southern Oregon pioneer life. It is a coming-of-age tale set in the early twentieth century. This novel received the Harper Prize for best first novel of 1935, together with a $7,500 cash award. It was well reviewed by writers such as Robert Penn Warren, although New Yorker critic Clifton Fadiman did not like it. The following spring the book won the Pulitzer Prize, and is the only Pulitzer Prize ever awarded to an Oregon born author. Davis did not go to New York to receive the Pulitzer in person, saying he did not want to put himself on exhibit.

His story "Open Winter" that was originally published in The Saturday Evening Post in 1939 was turned into a 1978 television movie called “Trail of Danger” that aired on The Wonderful World of Disney starring Larry Wilcox and Robert Donner.

The Davises bought a small ranch near Napa, California currently owned by Aaron and Claire Pott and is the estate vineyard known as Châteauneuf du Pott. There Davis wrote short stories as his primary source of income, publishing them in such magazines as Collier's and The Saturday Evening Post. He continued to work on novels. His second novel, Harp of a Thousand Strings, appeared in 1941. The long interval from his Pulitzer-winning first novel meant that his second did not receive the notice it would have earlier. In fact, although Davis continued to improve as a writer, none of his later efforts received the attention of Honey in the Horn.

Davis was also undergoing crises in his life. He was divorced in 1943. He also changed publishers, from Harper & Brothers to William Morrow & Company, apparently because of a long-running dispute over royalty payments.

== Later life ==
Over the next ten years, he published three more novels and a collection of earlier short stories. His fourth novel, Winds of Morning, was well received and became a Book of the Month Club selection. In 1953 he remarried, to Elizabeth Martin del Campo. As a result of arteriosclerosis, his left leg was amputated. He suffered chronic pain, but continued to write. In 1960 he died of a heart attack in San Antonio, Texas.

== Evaluation ==
Although often considered a regional novelist, Davis rejected that evaluation. He undoubtedly used regional themes, but contended that he did so in the service of the universal. Influences on his work can be found in a wide range of American and European literature. His prose is considered wry, ironic, and cryptic. His stories are realistic, without the romantic stereotypes expected of "Western" fiction. The landscape is a major component of his novels.

== Works ==
=== Novels ===
- —— (1935). Honey in the Horn. New York: Harper & Brothers. ISBN 089301155X.
- —— (1941). Harp of a Thousand Strings. New York: William Morrow & Co.
- —— (1949). Beulah Land. New York: William Morrow & Company.
- —— (1952). Winds of Morning. New York: William Morrow & Company. ISBN 0837157854.
- —— (1957). The Distant Music. New York: William Morrow & Company. ISBN 0891740457.

=== Short stories, essays and poetry ===
- —— (1942). Proud Riders and Other Poems. New York: Harper & Brothers.
- —— (1953). Team Bells Woke Me and Other Stories. New York: William Morrow & Company. ISBN 0837171253.
- —— (1957). Kettle of Fire. New York: William Morrow & Company. ISBN 129907362X.
- —— (1978). Burmaster, Orvis C. (ed.). The Selected Poems of H. L. Davis. Boise, Idaho: Ahsahta Press. ISBN 0916272079.

=== Stories ===
Title	Publication	Collected in
"Old Man Isbell's Wife"	The American Mercury (February 1929)	Team Bells Woke Me
"Back to the Land—Oregon, 1907"	The American Mercury (March 1929)	Team Bells Woke Me
"The Old-Fashioned Land—Eastern Oregon"	Frontier (March 1929)	-
"The Brown Stallion"	The American Mercury (September 1929)	-
"Cow-Town Widows"	The American Mercury (December 1929)	-
"A Town in Eastern Oregon"	The American Mercury (January 1930)	Team Bells Woke Me
"Water on the Wheat"	The American Mercury (February 1930)	-
"Hand-Press Journalist"	The American Mercury (April 1930)	-
"Three Hells: A Comparative Study"	The American Mercury (July 1930)	-
"Flying Switch"	Collier's (August 2, 1930)	Team Bells Woke Me
"Shiloh's Waters"	The Miscellany (September 1930)	Team Bells Woke Me
"A Pioneer Captain"	The American Mercury (February 1931)	-
"Team Bells Woke Me"	The American Mercury (April 1931)	Team Bells Woke Me
"Extra Gang"	The American Mercury (October 1931)	Team Bells Woke Me
"Wild Horse Siding"	Collier's (October 17, 1931)	-
"The Last Indian Outbreak: 1906"	The American Mercury (September 1933)	-
"American Apostle"	The American Mercury (October 1933)	-
"Murder Story"	The American Mercury (November 1933)	-
"Wild Headlight"	Collier's (December 30, 1933)	-
"Spanish Lady"	Collier's (July 14, 1934)	-
"Shotgun Junction"	Collier's (November 3, 1934)	-
"The Vanishing Wolf"	Collier's (February 2, 1935)	Team Bells Woke Me
"A Horse for Felipa"	Collier's (June 15, 1935)	-
"Railroad Beef"	Collier's (October 19, 1935)	-
"Hell to Be Smart"	The American Mercury (November 1935)	-
"Mrs. Almina Steed"	Ladies' Home Journal (March 1936)	-
"Cowboy Boots"	The Saturday Evening Post (August 1, 1936)	-
"Beach Squatter"	The Saturday Evening Post (November 21, 1936)	Team Bells Woke Me
"Open Winter"	The Saturday Evening Post (June 5, 1939)	Team Bells Woke Me
"The Homestead Orchard"	The Saturday Evening Post (July 29, 1939)	Team Bells Woke Me
"World of Little Doves"	The Saturday Evening Post (April 26, 1941)	Team Bells Woke Me
"The Stubborn Spearmen" aka "A Flock of Trouble"	The Saturday Evening Post (August 11, 1941)	Team Bells Woke Me
"A Sorrel Horse Doesn't Have White Hoofs"	The Saturday Evening Post (December 27, 1941)	-
"The Kettle of Fire"	Northwest Review 2.3 (Summer 1959)	Kettle of Fire
