= May Brookyn =

American actress

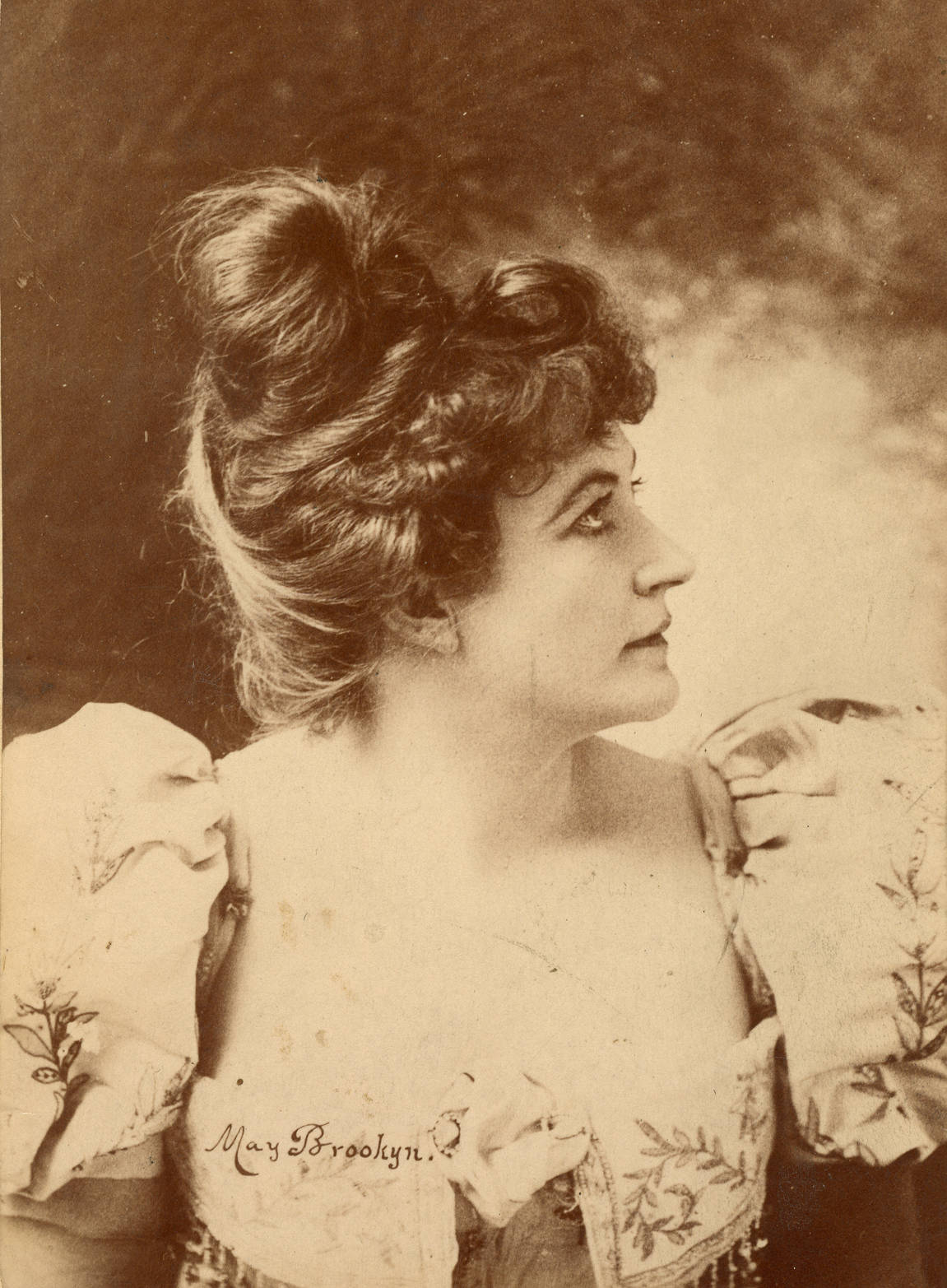
May Brookyn

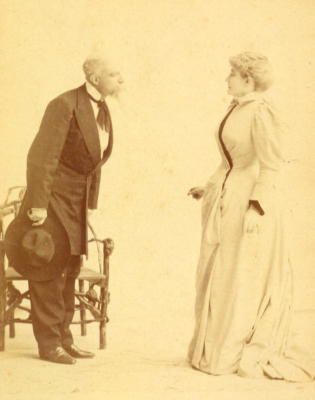
E. M. Holland and May Brookyn, Alabama

May Brookyn (1854/59 - February 15, 1894) was an English-born American stage actress.

On February 15, 1894 she died by suicide by taking carbolic acid in San Francisco. Her lover Frederic A. Lovecraft had committed suicide months before her own death.

== Early life ==
Brookyn was born in Cornwall, England. Her name was spelled Brookyn but is often misspelled Brooklyn.

== Career ==
Brookyn joined a theatrical company at age 15 when her parents were abroad. They made her return to school, but she persisted and resumed acting. Wilson Barrett signed her to act in a production of The Silver King in England. Her American stage debut came in the role of Claire in a production of The Forge Master.

== Suicide ==
On February 15, 1894 she died by suicide by taking carbolic acid in San Francisco several months after the death of her lover Frederic A. Lovecraft who shot himself. Brookyn was buried in Brooklyn's Evergreen Cemetery.

== Selected roles ==
- Jim the Penman as Mrs. Ralston (substitute for Agnes Booth)
- The Pharisee
- Alabama as Widow Page (1891)
- Lady Windermere's Fan as Mrs. Erlynne
