= Margaret Wilson (novelist) =

American novelist

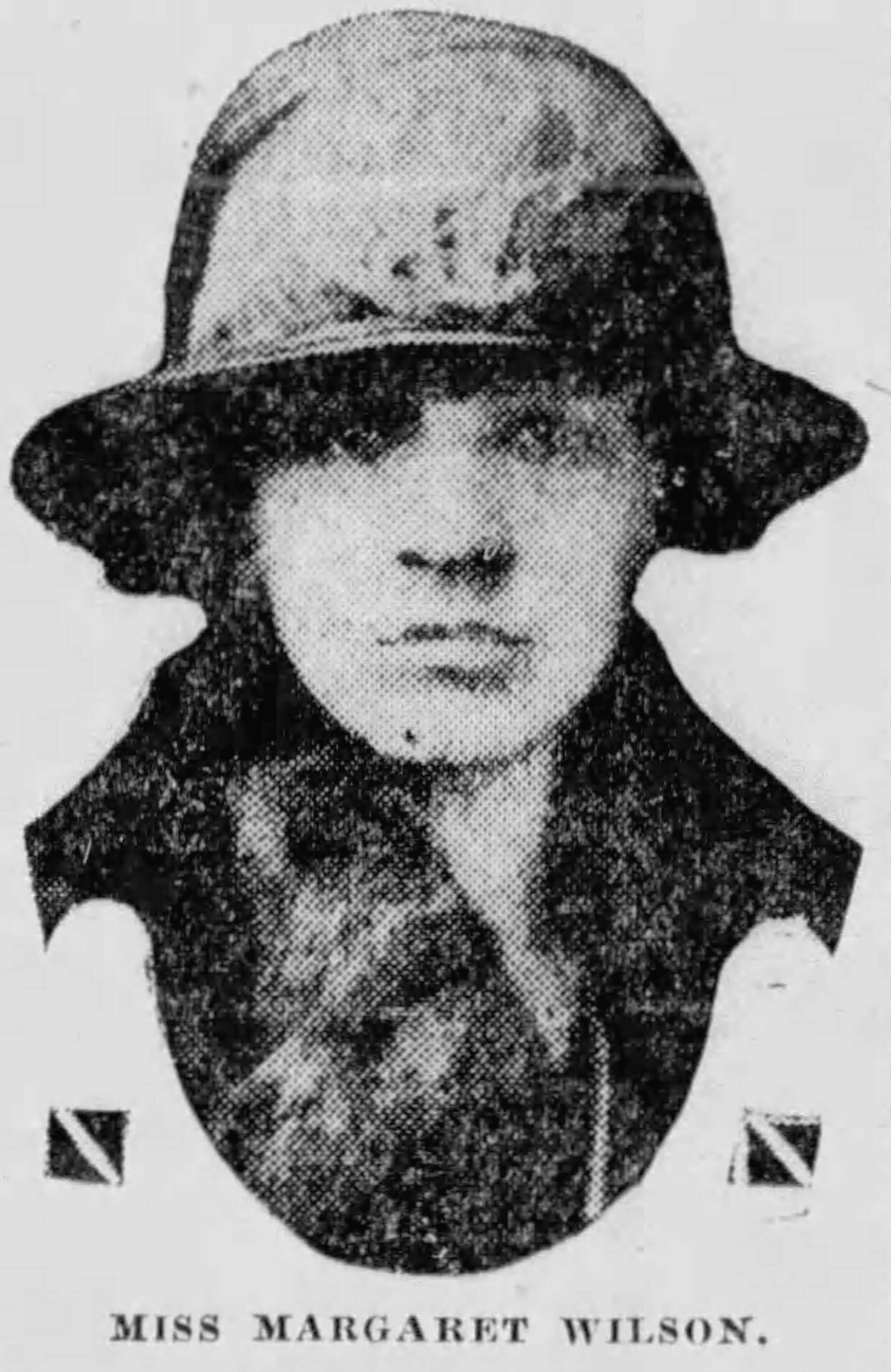
- Wilson c. 1923
- Born: January 16, 1882 Traer, Iowa, U.S.
- Died: October 6, 1973 (aged 91)
- Occupation: Novelist
- Education: University of Chicago
- Notable awards: Pulitzer Prize for Fiction (1924)

Margaret Wilhelmina Wilson (January 16, 1882 – October 6, 1973) was an American novelist. She was awarded the 1924 Pulitzer Prize for The Able McLaughlins.

== Early years and education ==
Born in Traer, Iowa, Wilson grew up on a farm and attended the University of Chicago, earning degrees in 1903 and 1904.

== Career ==
After completing her education, she became a missionary in the service of the United Presbyterian Church of North America. While assigned to the Punjab region of India, she worked at a girls' school and at a hospital. She returned to the U.S. in 1910 because of illness and resigned from her position as a missionary in 1916. She spent the year 1912-13 at the divinity school of the University of Chicago. Then she taught for five years at West Pullman High School. Throughout these years she cared for her invalid father and published her short stories in a variety of magazines, including the Atlantic Monthly.

The themes found throughout her writings include the secondary status of women and the role of religion. When she won a $2,000 prize offered by Harper & Brothers in 1923, her name was unknown because she had signed her short stories in Harper's Magazine "An Elderly Spinster." Her work is of interest in part for its exploration of feminist issues in a domestic context set against a background of an unsympathetic judicial system. She described herself as "the most Middle Western of Middle Westerners" and said that "she wrote for women readers from a woman's point of view. Two of her novels draw on her experiences in India. Written more than a decade after her return, she "managed to transform her more painful experiences into deeply sympathetic and engaging fiction." Daughters of India explores the world of polygamy and Trousers of Taffeta more specifically focuses on a woman's need to produce a male heir.

In 1923, she married George Douglas Turner, a Scotsman she had met in India nineteen years earlier, after which she remained resident in England. Turner was a tutor at Brasenose College, Oxford. He later served as warden of Dartmoor Prison. Penal reform inspired her non-fiction study The Crime of Punishment (1931) and two novels, The Dark Duty (1931) and The Valiant Wife (1933), both "melodramatic romances...constructed around the philosophical and dramatic problems of prison administration and reform." Besides her eight adult novels, she also wrote a novel for children, The Devon Treasure Mystery (1939), in which two girls and four boys become amateur detectives and search for a long lost treasure.

Wilson circa 1936

One summary of her critical reception concludes:

[Her] novels have been disparaged for a variety of weaknesses...and almost all her plots rely too heavily on coincidence. Her sharp sociological observations provide valuable insight for students of cultural history, however; in addition, her strengths as a novelist are evident in the detailed, naturalistic portraits of the daily lives of her characters, and in her inability [sic] to involve the reader in the problems her characters face.

Graham Greene, in a review of The Law and the McLaughlins, wrote: "She has an admirable gift for very simple direct narrative, and her theme has always been passionately realized in terms of human beings.... we are always aware of a writer of fine moral discrimination and a passionate awareness of individual suffering."

== Works ==
=== Novels ===
- The Able McLaughlins (1923), reprinted by Cherokee Publishing Company, Atlanta, GA, 2007 ISBN 978-0-87797-288-4
- The Kenworthys (1925)
- The Painted Room (1926), sequel to The Kenworthys
- Daughters of India (1928), reprinted by Oxford University Press, 2007 (edited by Ralph Crane) ISBN 0-19-568586-5
- Trousers of Taffeta (1929)
- The Dark Duty (1931)
- The Valiant Wife (1933)
- The Law and the McLaughlins (1936), sequel to The Able McLaughlins

=== Novel for children ===
- The Devon Treasure Mystery (1939)

=== Non-fiction ===
- The Crime of Punishment (1931)
