= Battle of Wana Camp =

1894 surprise attack on the British encampment in Wana, modern day Pakistan

- Part of the Waziristan campaign (1894–1895)
Date	3 November 1894
Location	Wana, British India
Result	British victory

Belligerents
(United Kingdom) British Empire: United Kingdom; British Raj	Mahsud tribesmen

Commanders and leaders
(United Kingdom) Brig. Gen. Turner (United Kingdom) Lt. Col. William Meiklejohn (United Kingdom) Lt. Percy Macaulay †	Mullah Powinda

Units involved
20th Punjab Infantry; 1st Gurkhas; 3rd Sikh Regiment; 1st Punjab Cavalry	Tribesmen

Strength
2,500	2,000 tribesmen

Casualties and losses
209 killed, 43 wounded	150 killed

The Battle of Wana Camp was a battle on 3 November 1894 between rebel Mahsud tribesmen and a British colonial frontier force stationed in Wana, on the northwestern frontier of the British Raj. The battle began a campaign of offensive actions by British forces in Waziristan to reduce the strength of Mahsud tribes within the area.

== Background ==
In the aftermath of the Second Anglo-Afghan War in 1893, the Emir of Afghanistan and British authorities formally established a defined border between Afghanistan and rural tribal areas within the British Raj. This new border establishment was known by the British as the Durand line, named after Mortimer Durand. The entire border was to be marked out with white posts, leading tribes in the area to assume that a full British annexation was to take place in due course. The British authorities in India established a camp in Wana, where the work of marking out the border was to be carried out. On 10th October 1894, a jirga from the Ahmadzai of Wana presented a petition from its tribal members asking British authorities to annex Wana and to make the Ahmadzai tribes British subjects, much to the dismay of Mashud tribes in the area. Additional British forces were sent to Wana afterwards.

In response to the British incursion into Waziristan, Mullah Powinda, a Mahsud tribal leader, gathered several thousand Mahsud tribesmen in an attempt to disrupt British advances in the area. On 2 November, the British dispatched a small reconnaissance force to the nearby the direction of the Inzar Narai peak, in an effort to identify Mullah's movements, shots were fired between the reconnaissance group and tribesmen, however no casualties occurred as a result of this skirmish. On the same day, demands for Mullah to disband his force in the form of messages were ignored. Mullah's forces were getting close to the camp by this time.

Due to the nature of the camp's original purpose, it was not suitable for defence in the event of an attack. One-hundred Gurkhas were assigned to take defensive positions in a deserted fortress, five-hundred yards to the north-east of the camp. Their role was to give the defenders the ability to attack enemy forces in the rear, whilst also being able to cut off their retreat route.

== The battle ==
Despite preparation by the British defenders, at 5:30 a.m. on 3rd November, as most of the camp's personnel slept, a force of 2,000 armed Mashud tribesmen attacked the camp. Waves of tribesmen appeared from nearby nullahs that concealed their approach to the perimeter of the camp. Only three minutes after the first shots had been fired, several of the tribesmen had reach the camp. The initial attack began on the western part of the camp, held by the 1st Gurkhas. The attack was led by a group of 800 'fanatical' tribesmen.

Only a small number of Gurkhas managed to reach the perimeter in time to meet the oncoming attackers. Most began only mere moments after leaving their tents, fighting with bayonet against sword and shield. E and G companies of the 1st Gurkhas managed to form a defensive line under Major Robinson and fought to hold the attackers back from the rest of the camp. By this time, some tribesmen had passed through the Gurkha camp and made their way to the camp hospital, slaughtering and injuring several of the 1st Punjab Cavalry's horses. A company of the 1st Gurkhas began to extend out from the north-west corner of the camp and began to fire in enfilade into the attacking tribesmen in the camp.

Once the other regiments had been awakened by the sound of fighting, the 20th Punjab infantry under Lieutenant Colonel Meiklejohn and Lieutenant Thompson and a company of the 3rd Sikhs under Lieutenant Finnis, began to move through the camp, killing several tribesmen, often at the point of a bayonet.

A group of tribesmen had reached the north-east of the camp and begin firing into the defenders' perimeter. At this time, illumination star shells were fired by nearby artillery stationed on a mountain-side, illuminating the camp along with daybreak. Shortly after this, the tribesmen began to retreat after losing the element of surprise.

A 61-man squadron of the 1st Punjab Cavalry, led by Major O’Mealy, was then sent out north towards the Inzar Kotal, in pursuit of the tribesmen, killing at least 50 of them during the 11-mile pursuit.

== Aftermath ==
The attack came as a surprise to the British, prompting Wana to be permanently garrisoned up until the dissolution of the British Raj in 1947.

During the attack, two British officers, two Indian officers and 209 soldiers were killed with another 43 wounded. Most of the British casualties consisted of the Gurkhas who bore the brunt of the initial attack.

At least one-hundred tribesmen were killed in the attack on the camp, with a further fifty cut down and killed by the 1st Punjab Cavalry pursuit. The attack of the camp was succeeded by a set of British reprisal attacks on Mashud territory, eventually subduing the tribes in March 1895.
