= 1935 Pulitzer Prize =

Awards for journalism and related fields

The following are the Pulitzer Prizes for 1935.

== Journalism awards ==
- Public Service:
  - The Sacramento Bee for its campaign against political machine influence in the appointment of two Federal judges in Nevada.
  - Honorable mention to The Sheboygan Press (Wisconsin) for "an investigation of conditions in state hospitals resulting in a legislative investigation and correction of evils".
- Reporting:
  - William Taylor of the New York Herald Tribune for the series of articles on the international yacht races.
- Correspondence:
  - Arthur Krock of The New York Times for his Washington dispatches
- Editorial Writing:
  - No award given.

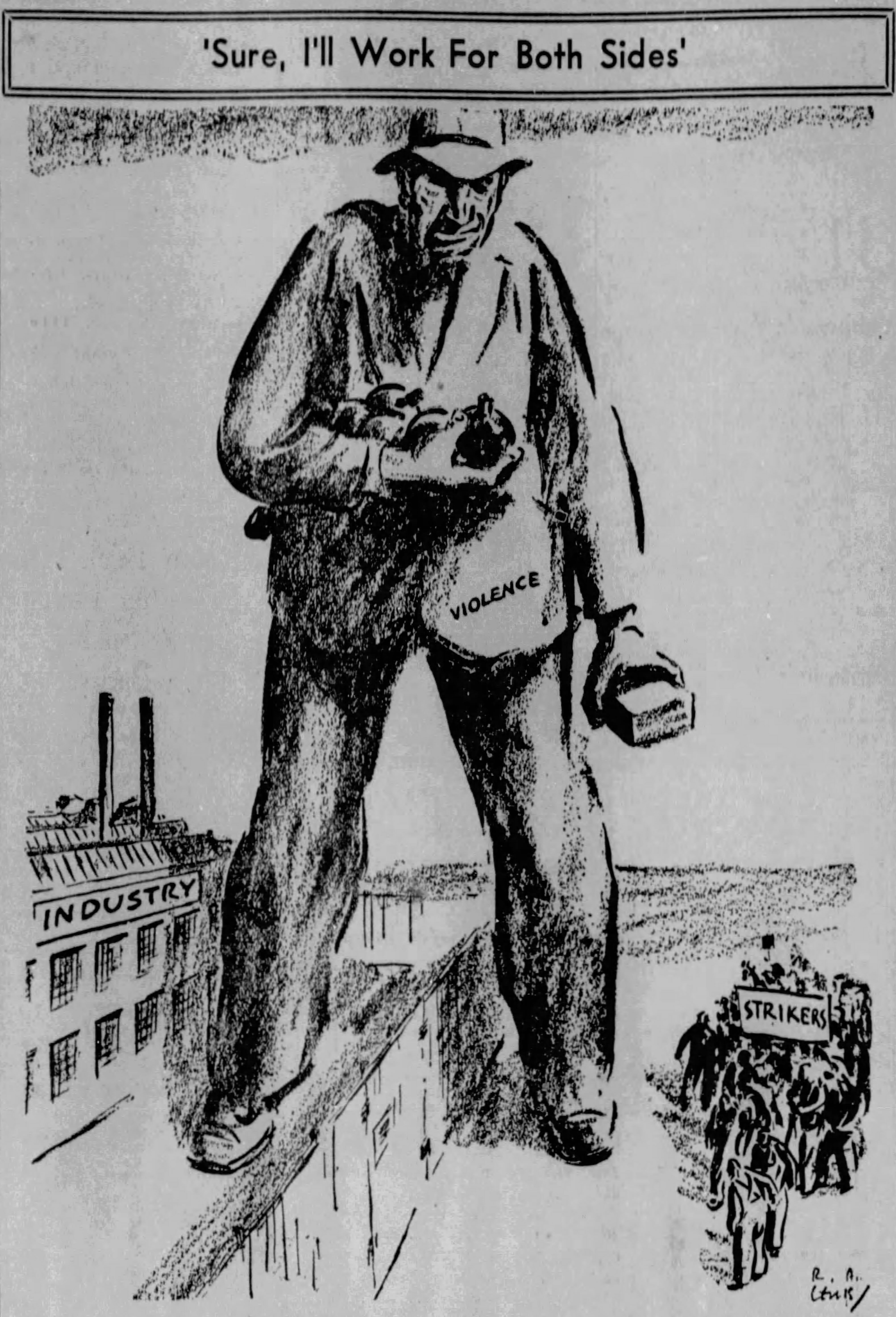
"Sure, I'll Work for Both Sides", the prize-winning editorial cartoon

- Editorial Cartooning:
  - Ross A. Lewis of the Milwaukee Journal for "Sure, I'll Work for Both Sides".

== Letters and Drama Awards ==
- Novel:
  - Now in November by Josephine Winslow Johnson (Simon & Schuster).
- Drama:
  - The Old Maid by Zoe Akins (Appleton)
- History:
  - The Colonial Period of American History by Charles McLean Andrews (Yale Univ. Press).
- Biography or Autobiography:
  - Biography of Robert E. Lee by Douglas S. Freeman (Scribner).
  - Honorable mention to James G. Blaine: A Political Idol of Other Days by David Saville Muzzey (Dodd, Mead).
- Poetry:
  - Bright Ambush by Audrey Wurdemann (John Day).
