= Pulitzer Prize for Fiction =

American award for distinguished novels

The Pulitzer Prize for Fiction is one of the twenty-three American Pulitzer Prizes that are annually awarded for Letters, Drama, and Music. It recognizes distinguished fiction by an American author, preferably dealing with American life, published during the preceding calendar year.

As the Pulitzer Prize for the Novel (awarded 1918–1947), it was one of the original Pulitzers; the program was inaugurated in 1917 with seven prizes, four of which were awarded that year (no Novel prize was awarded in 1917, the first one having been granted in 1918).

The name was changed to the Pulitzer Prize for Fiction in 1948 and eligibility was expanded to the broader "distinguished fiction published in book form". The Advisory Board wanted to give the award to James A. Michener's Tales of the South Pacific, which required expanding the category criteria and lifting the ban on short stories.

Finalists have been announced since 1980, usually a total of three.

== Definition ==
As defined in the original Plan of Award, the prize was given "Annually, for the American novel published during the year which shall best present the wholesome atmosphere of American life, and the highest standard of American manners and manhood," although there was some struggle over whether the word wholesome should be used instead of whole, the word Pulitzer had written in his will. In 1927, the advisory board quietly instituted Pulitzer's word choice, replacing wholesome with whole.

A new consideration arose when the Pulitzer jury was unanimous in recommending Thornton Wilder's The Bridge of San Luis Rey for the 1928 prize, although the book deals with Peruvians in Peru, not with Americans in America. The jury chair, Richard Burton of Columbia University, emphasized the moral value of the book in his report to the advisory board: "This piece of fiction is not only an admirable example of literary skill in the art of fiction, but also possesses a philosophic import and a spiritual elevation which greatly increases its literary value." Robert Morss Lovett disagreed, saying it would be "mere subterfuge to say that it has anything to do with the highest standard of American manners and manhood," but went along with the jury in finding "less literary merit" in the other novels under discussion. (Lovett rejected the runner-up Black April by Julia Peterkin, calling it "a rather unedifying picture of life in a primitive negro community" and "an ironical answer to the terms on which the prize is offered." Peterkin won nevertheless in 1929 for a similar novel, Scarlet Sister Mary.) Having settled on Bridge, the Advisory Board redefined the conditions from "whole atmosphere of American life, and the highest standard of American manners and manhood" to "preferably one which shall best present the whole atmosphere of American life," although this did not address the novel's setting. Further refinement into "the best novel published that year by an American author" removed any impediment to Pearl S. Buck's The Good Earth in 1932, also with a foreign setting in its study of Chinese village life in Anhui, East China.

With 1929 came the first of several much more substantive changes. The board changed the wording to "preferably one which shall best present the whole atmosphere of American life" and deleted the insistence that the novel portray "the highest standard of American manners and manhood". In 1936, emphasis was changed again, with the award going to "a distinguished novel published during the year by an American author, preferably dealing with American life". In 1948, the advisory board widened the scope of the award with the wording "For distinguished fiction published in book form during the year by an American author, preferably dealing with American life." This change allowed the prize to go to a collection of short stories for the first time, James Michener's Tales of the South Pacific.

== Winners ==
In 31 years under the "Novel" name, the prize was awarded 27 times; in its first 76 years to 2024 under the "Fiction" name, 70 times. There have been 11 years during which no title received the award. It was shared by two authors for the first time in 2023. Since this category's inception in 1918, 33 women have won the prize. Four authors have won two prizes each in the Fiction category: Booth Tarkington, William Faulkner, John Updike, and Colson Whitehead.

Because the award is for books published in the preceding calendar year, the "Year" column links to the preceding year in literature.

Winners (listed first) and finalists.

Year	Author	Work	Genre(s)
1918	Ernest Poole	His Family (Note: The 1918 jury gave honorable mention to Bromley Neighborhood by Alice Brown.)	Novel
1919	Booth Tarkington	The Magnificent Ambersons	Novel
1920	Not awarded (Note: In 1920, first-time fiction juror Stuart P. Sherman initially recommended Java Head by Joseph Hergesheimer for the award; he rescinded his recommendation when the other jurors informed him that the word "whole" in a key phrase of the original description of the award, "the whole atmosphere of American life", had subsequently been changed to "wholesome".)		
1921	Edith Wharton	The Age of Innocence (Note: Juror Robert Morss Lovett wrote in the June 22, 1921 issue of The New Republic that in fact the jury had preferred Main Street by Sinclair Lewis. The Pulitzer board overturned their decision. The man with the deciding vote may have been Nicholas Murray Butler. Lovett thought the public had a right to know that the jury had chosen another book. Lewis was angry but wrote her a congratulatory note. Wharton wrote back, "When I discovered that I was being rewarded — by one of our leading Universities — for uplifting American morals, I confess I did despair. Subsequently, when I found the prize shd really have been yours, but was withdrawn because your book (I quote from memory) had 'offended a number of prominent persons in the Middle West,' disgust was added to despair.")	Novel
1922	Booth Tarkington	Alice Adams	Novel
1923	Willa Cather	One of Ours	Novel
1924	Margaret Wilson	The Able McLaughlins	Debut novel
1925	Edna Ferber	So Big (Note: The 1925 jury was split between whether the prize should go to Balisand by Joseph Hergesheimer, Plumes by Lawrence Stallings or eventual winner So Big by Edna Ferber.)	Novel
1926	Sinclair Lewis	Arrowsmith (Note: In 1926, Sinclair Lewis declined the prize for Arrowsmith. The jury stated Arrowsmith was "best deserving the award," and also deemed Porgy by DuBose Heyward and The Smiths by Janet Ayer Fairbank "worthy competitors.")	Novel
1927	Louis Bromfield	Early Autumn	Novel
1928	Thornton Wilder	The Bridge of San Luis Rey (Note: The 1928 jury unanimously recommended Thornton Wilder's The Bridge of San Luis Rey. The jury also considered Black April by Julia Peterkin, The Grandmothers by Glenway Wescott, Islanders by Helen Rose Hull and A Yankee Passional by Samuel Ornitz.)	Novel
1929	Julia Peterkin	Scarlet Sister Mary (Note: The 1929 jury recommended Victim and Victor by John Rathbone Oliver for the prize. However, the Advisory Board named the jury's runner-up, Scarlet Sister Mary by Julia Peterkin, as the winner.)	Novel
1930	Oliver La Farge	Laughing Boy (Note: The 1930 jury was split between It's a Great War by Mary Lee, Laughing Boy by Oliver La Farge and Look Homeward, Angel by Thomas Wolfe, ultimately recommending Laughing Boy as their consensus choice.)	Novel
1931	Margaret Ayer Barnes	Years of Grace (Note: The 1931 jury shortlisted The Deepening Stream by Dorothy Canfield Fisher, The Great Meadow by Elizabeth Madox Roberts and their top-ranked choice Years of Grace by Margaret Ayer Barnes.)	Novel
1932	Pearl S. Buck	The Good Earth (Note: The 1932 jury was asked by Advisory Board secretary Frank D. Fackenthal to "list the books in the order of the jury's choice without indicating the ins and outs of the vote." Their report said that they had also "favorably considered" The Lady Who Came to Stay by R.E. Spencer and Shadows on the Rock by Willa Cather, noting "it's a rare year when three such excellent novels appear.")	Historical fiction
1933	T. S. Stribling	The Store (Note: The 1933 jury also considered God's Angry Man by Leonard Ehrlich, The Pilot Comes Aboard by Will Levington Comfort, Sons of the Martian by Donald C. Peattie and To Make My Bread by Grace Lumpkin.)	Novel
1934	Caroline Miller	Lamb in His Bosom (Note: The 1934 jury was not unanimous, but recommended A Watch in the Night by Helen C. White as their "majority choice", with Lamb in His Bosom by Caroline Miller a "close second" and No More Sea by Wilson Follett a "good third." The Advisory Board named Lamb in His Bosom as the winner.)	Debut novel
1935	Josephine Winslow Johnson	Now in November (Note: The 1935 jury was not unanimous and sent a list of titles for recommendation: The American by Louis Dodge, The Folks by Ruth Suckow, The Foundry by Albert Halper, Goodbye to the Past by W. R. Burnett, Land of Plenty by Robert Cantwell, Now in November by Josephine Winslow Johnson, Slim by William Wister Haines and So Red the Rose by Stark Young. The Advisory Board selected Now in November as the winner.)	Debut novel
1936	Harold L. Davis	Honey in the Horn (Note: The 1936 jury submitted a ranked list with eventual winner Honey in the Horn by Harold L. Davis first, followed in order by This Body the Earth by Paul Green, Time Out of Mind by Rachel Field, Ollie Miss by George Wylie Henderson, Deep Dark River by Robert Rylee and Blessed Is the Man by Louis Zara.)	Debut novel
1937	Margaret Mitchell	Gone with the Wind (Note: The 1937 jury also recommended Drums along the Mohawk by Walter D. Edmonds, The Last Puritan by George Santayana, Mountain Path by Harriette Simpson Arnow, Three Bags Full by Roger Burlingame and Yang and Yin by Alice Tisdale Hobart.)	Novel
1938	John Phillips Marquand	The Late George Apley (Note: The 1938 jury recommended The Late George Apley by John Phillips Marquand based on majority vote, also shortlisting Northwest Passage by Kenneth Roberts and Sound of Running Feet by Josephine Lawrence.)	Epistolary novel
1939	Marjorie Kinnan Rawlings	The Yearling (Note: The 1939 jury unanimously recommended The Yearling by Marjorie Kinnan Rawlings, also shortlisting All This, and Heaven Too by Rachel Field, Black Is My True Love's Hair by Elizabeth Madox Roberts, May Flavin by Myron Brinig and Renown by Frank O. Hough.)	Young adult literature
1940	John Steinbeck	The Grapes of Wrath (Note: The 1940 jury unanimously recommended The Grapes of Wrath by John Steinbeck, also shortlisting Escape by Ethel Vance, Night Rider by Robert Penn Warren, Seasoned Timber by Dorothy Canfield Fisher and To the End of the World by Helen C. White.)	Novel
1941	Not awarded (Note: The 1941 jury had recommended the award be shared by The Ox-Bow Incident by Walter Van Tilburg Clark and The Trees by Conrad Richter. While the Pulitzer Board initially intended to give the award to the jury's third choice, Ernest Hemingway's For Whom the Bell Tolls, the president of Columbia University, Nicholas Murray Butler, persuaded the board to reverse its judgment because he deemed the novel offensive, and no award was given that year.)		
1942	Ellen Glasgow	In This Our Life (Note: The 1942 jury's report stated that "none of the novels brought to its attention seemed of really outstanding merit... but since it is probably inadvisable to omit the award for two successive years, a list of possibilities is here submitted." Their shortlist consisted of The Great Big Doorstep by E. P. O'Donnell, Green Centuries by Caroline Gordon, Storm by George R. Stewart, and Windswept by Mary Ellen Chase. The Advisory Board bypassed the jury's selections, recommending eventual winner In This Our Life by Ellen Glasgow.)	Novel
1943	Upton Sinclair	Dragon's Teeth (Note: The 1943 jury unanimously recommended Dragon's Teeth by Upton Sinclair. They also considered The Just and the Unjust by James Gould Cozzens and The Valley of Decision by Marcia Davenport.)	Novel
1944	Martin Flavin	Journey in the Dark (Note: The 1944 jury also shortlisted Indigo by Christine Goutiere Weston, So Little Time by John P. Marquand and A Tree Grows in Brooklyn by Betty Smith.)	Novel
1945	John Hersey	A Bell for Adano (Note: The 1945 jury also shortlisted Colcorton by Edith Pope and The History of Rome Hanks and Kindred Matters by Joseph Pennell.)	War novel
1946	Not awarded (Note: The 1946 jury shortlisted Apartment in Athens by Glenway Wescott, Black Boy by Richard Wright and The Wayfarers by Dan Wickenden. The jury as a whole could not reach a consensus; one point of contention over Black Boy specifically was that the book is a memoir, not a novel.)		
1947	Robert Penn Warren	All the King's Men (Note: The 1947 jury submitted ranked choices with The Fields by Conrad Richter as their top choice, followed by East River by Sholem Asch in second, eventual winner All the King's Men by Robert Penn Warren and The Street by Ann Petry in a tie for third, and B.F.'s Daughter by John P. Marquand in a distant fifth.)	Political fiction
1948	James A. Michener	Tales of the South Pacific (Note: The 1948 jury submitted ranks choices with The Big Sky by A. B. Guthrie Jr. as their top choice, followed by Knock on Any Door by Willard Motley in second, The Garretson Chronicle by Gerald Warner Brace in third, The Stoic by Theodore Dreiser in fourth, The Gallery by John Horne Burns and eventual winner Tales of the South Pacific by James A. Michener in a tie for fifth.)	Interrelated short stories, Book debut
1949	James Gould Cozzens	Guard of Honor (Note: The 1949 jury also shortlisted The Ides of March by Thornton Wilder, The Naked and the Dead by Norman Mailer and The Young Lions by Irwin Shaw.)	War novel
1950	A. B. Guthrie	The Way West (Note: The 1950 jury also shortlisted The Brave Bulls by Tom Lea and Hunter's Horn by Harriette Simpson Arnow.)	Western fiction
1951	Conrad Richter	The Town (Note: The 1951 jury recommended The Wall by John Hersey for the prize. Asked to provide additional suggestions, they reiterated their support for The Wall, but also shortlisted Debby by Max Steele, eventual winner The Town by Conrad Richter and World Enough and Time by Robert Penn Warren.)	Novel
1952	Herman Wouk	The Caine Mutiny (Note: The 1952 jury also shortlisted Jenkins' Ear by William and Odell Shepard.)	Historical fiction
1953	Ernest Hemingway	The Old Man and the Sea (Note: The two-man 1953 jury separately submitted ranked lists. One juror listed Jefferson Selleck by Carl Jonas first while the other listed eventual winner The Old Man and the Sea by Ernest Hemingway first.)	Short novel
1954	Not awarded (Note: The two-man 1954 jury could not agree on a single book to recommend to the Advisory Board, so no award was given; among the books recommended by juror Eric P. Kelly were Ramey by Jack D. Ferris, The Sands of Karakorum by James Ullman, The Adventures of Augie March by Saul Bellow, and The Four Lives of Mundy Tolliver by Ben Lucien Burman, while juror Harris F. Fletcher recommended The Street of the Three Friends by Myron Brinig and The Deep Sleep by Wright Morris)		
1955	William Faulkner	A Fable (Note: The 1954 jury unanimously recommended The Last Hunt by Milton Lott. The Pulitzer board selected the jury's second place choice, A Fable by William Faulkner, as the winner.)	Novel
1956	MacKinlay Kantor	Andersonville (Note: The 1955 jury unanimously recommended Andersonville by MacKinlay Kantor. Their report qualified that "the runners-up in the field seem far behind," but they also shortlisted Band of Angels by Robert Penn Warren and Ten North Frederick by John O'Hara.)	Historical fiction
1957	Not awarded (Note: The 1957 jury recommended The Voice at the Back Door by Elizabeth Spencer for the prize, further shortlisting The Last Hurrah by Edwin O'Connor. The Pulitzer board chose to give no award.)		
1958	James Agee	A Death in the Family (Note: The 1958 jury recommended By Love Possessed by James Gould Cozzens for the prize. They also provided a shortlist of other contenders led by eventual winner A Death in the Family by James Agee, followed in order by The Wapshot Chronicle by John Cheever, The Assistant by Bernard Malamud, The Town by William Faulkner, The Weather of February by Hollis Summers, The Goblins of Eros by Warren Eyster and The Velvet Horn by Andrew Nelson Lytle.) (posthumously)	Autobiographical novel
1959	Robert Lewis Taylor	The Travels of Jaimie McPheeters (Note: The 1959 jury recommended From the Terrace by John O'Hara for the prize. The Pulitzer board selected the jury's second choice, The Travels of Jaimie McPheeters by Robert Lewis Taylor, as the winner. Home from the Hill by William Humphrey was the jury's third choice.)	Historical fiction
1960	Allen Drury	Advise and Consent (Note: The 1960 jury recommended Henderson the Rain King by Saul Bellow for the prize, also shortlisting Dance Back the Buffalo by Milton Lott, Hawaii by James A. Michener and The Mansion by William Faulkner. The Pulitzer board substituted their own choice: Advise and Consent by Allen Drury.)	Political fiction, Debut novel
1961	Harper Lee	To Kill a Mockingbird (Note: The 1961 jury listed The Child Buyer by John Hersey as runner-up and gave honorable mention to Lament for a City by Henry Beetle Hough and A Separate Peace by John Knowles.)	Southern Gothic, Bildungsroman, Debut novel
1962	Edwin O'Connor	The Edge of Sadness (Note: The 1962 jury shortlisted The Chateau by William Maxwell and Clock without Hands by Carson McCullers.)	Novel
1963	William Faulkner	The Reivers (Note: The 1963 jury recommended Ship of Fools by Katherine Anne Porter for the prize. The Pulitzer board selected the jury's second place choice, The Reivers by William Faulkner, as the winner. The jury also commended A Long and Happy Life by Reynolds Price.) (posthumously)	Novel
1964	Not awarded (Note: "Among the books the judges most seriously considered were the following: (1) Norman Fruchter's Coat upon a Stick…, (2) May Sarton's novella Joanna and Ulysses…, (3) Sumner Locke Elliott's Careful, He Might Hear You…, [and] (4) John Killens' And Then We Heard the Thunder… If a prize were to be awarded for a 1963 novel we felt these to be the most serious candidates." However, the fiction jury ultimately recommended that no award be given because "no one of them imposes itself upon us as demanding recognition as 'distinguished fiction'….")		
1965	Shirley Ann Grau	The Keepers of the House	Novel
1966	Katherine Anne Porter	The Collected Stories (Note: The 1966 jury shortlisted Miss MacIntosh, My Darling by Marguerite Young.)	Short story collection
1967	Bernard Malamud	The Fixer	Novel
1968	William Styron	The Confessions of Nat Turner (Note: The 1968 jury was split. They offered The Eighth Day by Thornton Wilder as a consensus selection, also having considered All the Little Live Things by Wallace Stegner. Two jurors submitted The Manor by Isaac Bashevis Singer as a majority opinion while The Confessions of Nat Turner by William Styron, presented as a minority opinion by one jury member, was selected as the eventual winner.)	Historical fiction
1969	N. Scott Momaday	House Made of Dawn (Note: The 1969 jury chose A World of Profit by Louis Auchincloss as their second choice and And Other Stories by John O'Hara as their third choice.)	Novel
1970	Jean Stafford	Collected Stories (Note: The 1970 jury recommended Them by Joyce Carol Oates for the prize. The Pulitzer board awarded the first runner-up, Collected Stories by Jean Stafford. The jury also listed Bullet Park by John Cheever as second runner-up.)	Short story collection
1971	Not awarded (Note: The 1971 jury put forth three novels for consideration to the Pulitzer board: Losing Battles by Eudora Welty, Mr. Sammler's Planet by Saul Bellow and The Wheel of Love by Joyce Carol Oates. The board rejected all three and opted for no award.)		
1972	Wallace Stegner	Angle of Repose (Note: The 1972 jury unanimously recommended Angle of Repose by Wallace Stegner for the prize. They also shortlisted Love in the Ruins by Walker Percy and The Autobiography of Miss Jane Pittman by Ernest J. Gaines and suggested Death of the Fox by George Garrett for special commendation.)	Novel
1973	Eudora Welty	The Optimist's Daughter	Short novel
1974	Not awarded (Note: The 1974 jury unanimously recommended Gravity's Rainbow by Thomas Pynchon for the prize. The Pulitzer board, which has sole discretion for awarding the prize, made no award. The jury also shortlisted The World of Apples by John Cheever and Burr by Gore Vidal.)		
1975	Michael Shaara	The Killer Angels	Historical fiction
1976	Saul Bellow	Humboldt's Gift (Note: The 1976 jury shortlisted Are We There Yet? by Diane Vreul, The Dead Father by Donald Barthelme, Ragtime by E. L. Doctorow and The Surface of Earth by Reynolds Price.)	Novel
1977	Not awarded (Note: The 1977 jury recommended A River Runs through It by Norman MacLean for the prize. The Pulitzer board, which has sole discretion for awarding the prize, made no award. They also shortlisted The Franchiser by Stanley Elkin and October Light by John Gardner.)		
1978	James Alan McPherson	Elbow Room (Note: The 1978 jury unanimously recommended Elbow Room by James Alan McPherson for the prize. They also considered Earthly Possessions by Anne Tyler, In the Miro District and Other Stories by Peter Taylor, Over by the River and Other Stories by William Maxwell and The Thin Mountain Air by Paul Horgan.)	Short story collection
1979	John Cheever	The Stories of John Cheever (Note: The 1979 jury unanimously recommended The Stories of John Cheever by John Cheever for the prize. They also shortlisted Continental Drift by James D. Houston and The World According to Garp by John Irving.)	Short story collection
1980	Norman Mailer	The Executioner's Song	True crime novel
1980	William Wharton	Birdy	
1980	Philip Roth	The Ghost Writer	
1981	John Kennedy Toole	A Confederacy of Dunces (posthumously)	Picaresque novel
1981	Frederick Buechner	Godric	
1981	William Maxwell	So Long, See You Tomorrow	
1982	John Updike	Rabbit Is Rich	Novel
1982	Robert Stone	A Flag for Sunrise	
1982	Marilynne Robinson	Housekeeping	
1983	Alice Walker	The Color Purple	Epistolary novel
1983	Anne Tyler	Dinner at the Homesick Restaurant	
1983	Chaim Grade	Rabbis and Wives	
1984	William Kennedy	Ironweed	Novel
1984	Raymond Carver	Cathedral	
1984	Thomas Berger	The Feud	
1985	Alison Lurie	Foreign Affairs	Novel
1985	Diana O'Hehir	I Wish This War Were Over	
1985	Douglas Unger	Leaving the Land	
1986	Larry McMurtry	Lonesome Dove	Western novel
1986	Russell Banks	Continental Drift	
1986	Anne Tyler	The Accidental Tourist	
1987	Peter Taylor	A Summons to Memphis	Novel
1987	Donald Barthelme	Paradise	
1987	Norman Rush	Whites	
1988	Toni Morrison	Beloved	Novel
1988	Diane Johnson	Persian Nights	
1988	Alice McDermott	That Night	
1989	Anne Tyler	Breathing Lessons	Novel
1989	Raymond Carver	Where I'm Calling From	
1990	Oscar Hijuelos	The Mambo Kings Play Songs of Love	Novel
1990	E. L. Doctorow	Billy Bathgate	
1991	John Updike	Rabbit at Rest	Novel
1991	Linda Hogan	Mean Spirit	
1991	Tim O'Brien	The Things They Carried	
1992	Jane Smiley	A Thousand Acres	Domestic realism
1992	David Gates	Jernigan	
1992	Robert M. Pirsig	Lila: An Inquiry into Morals	
1992	Don DeLillo	Mao II	
1993	Robert Olen Butler	A Good Scent from a Strange Mountain	Short story collection
1993	Alice McDermott	At Weddings and Wakes	
1993	Joyce Carol Oates	Black Water	
1994	E. Annie Proulx	The Shipping News	Novel
1994	Philip Roth	Operation Shylock: A Confession	
1994	Reynolds Price	The Collected Stories	
1995	Carol Shields	The Stone Diaries	Novel
1995	Grace Paley	The Collected Stories	
1995	Joyce Carol Oates	What I Lived For	
1996	Richard Ford	Independence Day	Novel
1996	Oscar Hijuelos	Mr. Ives' Christmas	
1996	Philip Roth	Sabbath's Theater	
1997	Steven Millhauser	Martin Dressler: The Tale of an American Dreamer	Novel
1997	Joanna Scott	The Manikin	
1997	Ursula K. Le Guin	Unlocking the Air and Other Stories	
1998	Philip Roth	American Pastoral	Novel
1998	Robert Stone	Bear and His Daughter: Stories	
1998	Don DeLillo	Underworld	
1999	Michael Cunningham	The Hours	historical fiction
1999	Russell Banks	Cloudsplitter	
1999	Barbara Kingsolver	The Poisonwood Bible	
2000	Jhumpa Lahiri	Interpreter of Maladies	Short story collection
2000	Annie Proulx	Close Range: Wyoming Stories	
2000	Ha Jin	Waiting	
2001	Michael Chabon	The Amazing Adventures of Kavalier and Clay	Historical fiction
2001	Joyce Carol Oates	Blonde	
2001	Joy Williams	The Quick and the Dead	
2002	Richard Russo	Empire Falls	Novel
2002	Colson Whitehead	John Henry Days	
2002	Jonathan Franzen	The Corrections	
2003	Jeffrey Eugenides	Middlesex	Family saga
2003	Andrea Barrett	Servants of the Map: Stories	
2003	Adam Haslett	You Are Not a Stranger Here	
2004	Edward P. Jones	The Known World	Historical fiction
2004	Susan Choi	American Woman	
2004	Marianne Wiggins	Evidence of Things Unseen	
2005	Marilynne Robinson	Gilead	Epistolary novel
2005	Ward Just	An Unfinished Season	
2005	Ha Jin	War Trash	
2006	Geraldine Brooks	March	Historical fiction
2006	Lee Martin	The Bright Forever	
2006	E. L. Doctorow	The March	
2007	Cormac McCarthy	The Road	Post-apocalyptic fiction
2007	Alice McDermott	After This	
2007	Richard Powers	The Echo Maker	
2008	Junot Díaz	The Brief Wondrous Life of Oscar Wao	Novel
2008	Lore Segal	Shakespeare's Kitchen	
2008	Denis Johnson	Tree of Smoke	
2009	Elizabeth Strout	Olive Kitteridge	Short story collection
2009	Christine Schutt	All Souls	
2009	Louise Erdrich	The Plague of Doves	
2010	Paul Harding	Tinkers	Novel
2010	Daniyal Mueenuddin	In Other Rooms, Other Wonders	
2010	Lydia Millet	Love in Infant Monkeys	
2011	Jennifer Egan	A Visit from the Goon Squad	Short story collection
2011	Jonathan Dee	The Privileges	
2011	Chang-rae Lee	The Surrendered	
2012	Not awarded		
2012	Karen Russell	Swamplandia!	
2012	David Foster Wallace	The Pale King (posthumously)	
2012	Denis Johnson	Train Dreams	
2013	Adam Johnson	The Orphan Master's Son (Note: "An exquisitely crafted novel that carries the reader on an adventuresome journey into the depths of totalitarian North Korea and into the most intimate spaces of the human heart.")	Novel
2013	Eowyn Ivey	The Snow Child	
2013	Nathan Englander	What We Talk About When We Talk about Anne Frank	
2014	Donna Tartt	The Goldfinch (Note: "A beautifully written coming-of-age novel with exquisitely drawn characters that follows a grieving boy's entanglement with a small famous painting that has eluded destruction, a book that stimulates the mind and touches the heart.")	Novel
2014	Philipp Meyer	The Son	
2014	Bob Shacochis	The Woman Who Lost Her Soul	
2015	Anthony Doerr	All the Light We Cannot See (Note: "An imaginative and intricate novel inspired by the horrors of World War II and written in short, elegant chapters that explore human nature and the contradictory power of technology.")	War novel
2015	Richard Ford	Let Me Be Frank with You	
2015	Joyce Carol Oates	Lovely, Dark, Deep	
2015	Laila Lalami	The Moor's Account	
2016	Viet Thanh Nguyen	The Sympathizer (Note: "A layered immigrant tale told in the wry, confessional voice of a "man of two minds" -- and two countries, Vietnam and the United States.")	Novel
2016	Kelly Link	Get in Trouble: Stories	
2016	Margaret Verble	Maud's Line	
2017	Colson Whitehead	The Underground Railroad (Note: "For a smart melding of realism and allegory that combines the violence of slavery and the drama of escape in a myth that speaks to contemporary America.")	Alternate historical fiction
2017	Adam Haslett	Imagine Me Gone	
2017	C. E. Morgan	The Sport of Kings	
2018	Andrew Sean Greer	Less (Note: "A generous book, musical in its prose and expansive in its structure and range, about growing older and the essential nature of love.")	Satire
2018	Hernan Diaz	In the Distance	
2018	Elif Batuman	The Idiot	
2019	Richard Powers	The Overstory (Note: "An ingeniously structured narrative that branches and canopies like the trees at the core of the story whose wonder and connectivity echo those of the humans living amongst them.")	Novel
2019	Rebecca Makkai	The Great Believers	
2019	Tommy Orange	There There	
2020	Colson Whitehead	The Nickel Boys (Note: "A spare and devastating exploration of abuse at a reform school in Jim Crow-era Florida that is ultimately a powerful tale of human perseverance, dignity and redemption.")	Novel
2020	Ann Patchett	The Dutch House	
2020	Ben Lerner	The Topeka School	
2021	Louise Erdrich	The Night Watchman (Note: "A majestic, polyphonic novel about a community's efforts to halt the proposed displacement and elimination of several Native American tribes in the 1950s, rendered with dexterity and imagination.")	Novel
2021	Daniel Mason	A Registry of My Passage upon the Earth	
2021	Percival Everett	Telephone	
2022	Joshua Cohen	The Netanyahus: An Account of a Minor and Ultimately Even Negligible Episode in the History of a Very Famous Family (Note: "A mordant, linguistically deft historical novel about the ambiguities of the Jewish American experience, presenting ideas and disputes as volatile as its tightly-wound plot.")	Novel
2022	Francisco Goldman	Monkey Boy	
2022	Gayl Jones	Palmares	
2023	Barbara Kingsolver	Demon Copperhead (Note: "A masterful recasting of "David Copperfield," narrated by an Appalachian boy whose wise, unwavering voice relates his encounters with poverty, addiction, institutional failures and moral collapse–and his efforts to conquer them.")	Novel
2023	Hernan Diaz	Trust (Note: "A riveting novel set in a bygone America that explores family, wealth and ambition through linked narratives rendered in different literary styles, a complex examination of love and power in a country where capitalism is king.")	Novel
2023	Vauhini Vara	The Immortal King Rao	
2024	Jayne Anne Phillips	Night Watch (Note: "A beautifully rendered novel set in West Virginia's Trans-Allegheny Lunatic Asylum in the aftermath of the Civil War, where a severely wounded Union veteran, a 12-year-old girl and her mother, long abused by a Confederate soldier, struggle to heal.")	Novel
2024	Ed Park	Same Bed Different Dreams	
2024	Yiyun Li	Wednesday's Child	
2025	Percival Everett	James (Note: "An accomplished reconsideration of 'Huckleberry Finn' that gives agency to Jim to illustrate the absurdity of racial supremacy and provide a new take on the search for family and freedom.")	Novel
2025	Rita Bullwinkel	Headshot: A Novel	
2025	Stacey Levine	Mice 1961	
2025	Gayl Jones	The Unicorn Woman	
2026	Daniel Kraus	Angel Down (Note: "A breathless novel of World War I, a stylistic tour-de-force that blends such genres as allegory, magical realism and science fiction into a cohesive whole, told in a single sentence.")	Novel
2026	Katie Kitamura	Audition	
2026	Torrey Peters	Stag Dance: A Quartet	

== Repeat winners ==
Four writers to date have won the Pulitzer Prize for Fiction multiple times, one nominally in the novel category and two in the general fiction category. Ernest Hemingway was selected by the 1941 and 1953 juries, but the former was overturned with no award given that year.

- Booth Tarkington, 1919, 1922
- William Faulkner, 1955, 1963 (awarded posthumously)
- John Updike, 1982, 1991
- Colson Whitehead, 2017, 2020

== Authors with multiple nominations ==
4 nominations

- Joyce Carol Oates
- Philip Roth

3 nominations

- Alice McDermott
- Anne Tyler
- Colson Whitehead

2 nominations

- Russell Banks
- Raymond Carver
- Don DeLillo
- Hernan Diaz
- E. L. Doctorow
- Louise Erdrich
- Percival Everett
- Richard Ford
- Adam Haslett
- Oscar Hijuelos
- Ha Jin
- Denis Johnson
- Gayl Jones
- Barbara Kingsolver
- Richard Powers
- Annie Proulx
- Marilynne Robinson
- Robert Stone
- John Updike

== Notes ==
- vid Levering Lewis
