= The Awakening Land trilogy =

Novels by Conrad Richter, 1940, 1946, 1950

The Awakening Land
- First edition dust jacket
- Author: Conrad Richter
- Language: English
- Publisher: Alfred A. Knopf
- Publication date: 1966
- Publication place: United States
- English publication date: September 1966
- Media type: Print (Hardback)

The Awakening Land trilogy by Conrad Richter is a series of three novels that explore the lives of a white American frontier family in the Ohio Valley from the late 18th century to the middle of the 19th. The series consists of The Trees (1940), The Fields (1946), and The Town (1950); the third novel won the Pulitzer Prize for Fiction in 1951. These works established Richter as a major novelist of historical fiction.

The Awakening Land trilogy was first issued in a single hardcover volume in September 1966, by Alfred A. Knopf. The trilogy was adapted as a United States TV miniseries by the same name, produced in 1978. The three novels were reissued in paperback in 1991 by Ohio University Press, and also in 2017 by Chicago Review Press.

== Plot summaries ==
The Trees (1940) introduces the Luckett family, who emigrate from Pennsylvania to the Ohio Valley wilderness about 1795, after the American Revolutionary War and the founding of the United States of America. Told mostly from the point of view of the eldest daughter, Sayward, the novel explores how the family carves a homestead from the forest, suffering losses and hardships along the way.

The Fields (1946) follows Sayward in her marriage to Portius Wheeler, a pioneer from the East. They raise a family of nine children together, although Portius also fathers a daughter, Rosa Tench, by another woman. The family and community continue to clear more trees in order to expand their area for farming and to make way for new dwellings. The Wheeler homestead becomes the nucleus of a settlement called Moonshine Church.

The Town (1950) continues the story of Sayward’s family. She witnesses the transformation of the settlement into a modern industrialized town called Americus. Her family moves into a refined, large house in town. Many of the chapters in The Town are told from the point of view of Sayward’s youngest son, Chancey, who becomes a journalist and represents the rising post-frontier town and city generation of the 19th century.

== Writing style ==
Richter extensively researched the mode of speech of the early-19th-century pioneers of the Ohio Valley, many of whom originally emigrated from Pennsylvania and the Upper South. (For example, they referred to “trees” as “butts.”) In order to convey in writing an historic sense of the dialect, Richter studied rare collections of old manuscripts, letters, and records which demonstrated or documented the speech of late-18th- and early-19th-century residents. His sources included Henry Howe's Historical Collections of Ohio and Pioneer Pennsylvania, a compilation of archaic Pennsylvanian slang by Henry W. Shoemaker. Richter also interviewed scholars and former neighbors of pioneer heritage whom he had known in his home state of Pennsylvania and in the Ohio Valley.

Richter wrote that this early form of spoken language no longer survived in the Ohio Valley. He learned that it was found in some areas of the South and Southwestern areas of the country. He noted that, although it is often mistaken for a "native" form of speech there, it should be considered “a living reminder of the great mother tongue of early America.”

== Major themes ==
=== Family ===
Sayward values family above all else. She expresses a strong loyalty to the ties of kinship, even if this loyalty is not always returned. Several members of her birth family, including her father, Worth, her brother Wyitt, and her sister Ascha eventually abandon or otherwise leave the family home, with no attempt to maintain communication. Her younger sister, Sulie, is lost to the forest, and eventually is assimilated into the Lenape Indian tribe. But Sayward always remembers these absent family members and holds them in her thoughts. When she has problems in her marriage or with her own children, whether because of her husband's infidelity or because of generational differences, Sayward tries to defuse tensions and ultimately forgives any wrongs committed.

=== Man against Nature ===
The characters in The Awakening Land deal with the human condition in a setting of great natural challenges as they carve out lives on the frontier. Disease, warfare, natural disasters, severe weather, and accidents, as well as dangerous animals, all contributed to a high mortality rate amongst the pioneers. They worked to cut down trees and clear the land, to cultivate crops, to care for livestock, and to raise and process all their food. They also had to deal with hostilities from native Indians resisting white American encroachment. At times the pioneers and settlers faced famine and such natural disasters as floods.

=== Change and nostalgia ===
The central character, Sayward Luckett Wheeler, witnesses the transformation of the frontier settlement founded by her father into a town with a church, a school, frame and brick houses, businesses, and such other improvements as roads, bridges, canals, a railroad, and a county courthouse – all within her lifespan of some eighty-odd years. Although Sayward at first welcomes these developments as a promise of prosperity and improved lives, by the end of the trilogy, she questions whether the rapid changes have instead fostered greed and laziness in the townspeople.

Sayward’s changing feelings are symbolized by her attitude toward the trees of the forest. The original settlers cut these down in a wide area to develop their farmsteads and later the town of Americus. In the beginning, Sayward has an almost personal animosity toward the trees, because of the backbreaking labor they required as settlers struggled to clear the land for farms and homes. By the last novel of the trilogy, Sayward mourns the loss of the great trees:

"She had thought it then a wonderful sight to see, a place free of the lonesome gloom of the deep woods, and nary a big butt (tree) to have to cut down and burn up. But she didn't know how much she liked it now. . . . Now why did she think all her life that trees were savage and cruel? . . . . Maybe she was just homesick for when she was young."

Coming to understand what they mean to her, Sayward finds several young trees on the edges of her former land. She transplants them to the front and side yards of her house. On her deathbed, before she loses the power of speech, she asks for her bed to be moved so that she can see the trees to her last breath.

=== Pioneer vs. modern generation ===
Sayward believes that the original settlers were forced to build character by their hard work and persistence in the face of adversity. By contrast, the new generation of town settlers seems untested. To Sayward's mind, the new generation are taking advantage of the work done by people before them, and have not made equal contributions or sacrifices. Contemporary life seems easy by contrast.

“What gave folks ‘narve strings’ today and made them soft so they couldn’t stand what folks could when she was young? . . . . It had taken a wild and rough land to breed the big butts (trees) she saw when first she came here, and she reckoned it took a rough and hard life to breed the kind of folks she knew as a young woman. If you made it easy for folks, it seemed like their hardihood had to pay for it.”

By comparison, her youngest son, Chancey, follows the Socialist beliefs of social reformer Robert Owen. He believes that the goal of the community should be sharing labor for the benefit of all, that progress means that work could be rewarding in itself, and there should not be wide separation of classes.

“Robert Owen said . . . if you make a man happy, you make him virtuous. [He] said that one of the main occupations of working people should be play. . . . Everybody can choose his own work and do as little of it as he wants to. . . . Of course there’ll have to be a little repulsive labor at first. But progress will do away with all toil and labor in time. . . . Everybody will share alike. There’ll be no rich people and no poor people, just brothers and sisters. And everybody will have security and happiness.”

== Critical reception ==
When reviewing Richter’s 1950 book The Town, fellow Pulitzer Prize-winner and Ohioan author Louis Bromfield surveyed the trilogy, writing:

“As the names imply, the three books are not only concerned with Sayward and her family but the growth and the astonishingly rapid development of a whole area which has played a key role in the nation’s history . . . . When you read the three books in the trilogy, you live them, and I can think of no greater tribute for a novel.”

Writer Isaac Bashevis Singer, a Nobel Prize winner in 1978, referred to The Awakening Land trilogy in his foreword of Richter’s 1968 novel The Aristocrat:

“There are in the literature of the world few works of historical fiction that make this reader feel that the writer must have been a witness to what he describes . . . . 'The Awakening Land' is such a work . . . it would be a great novel in any literature.’’

== Film and TV adaptations ==
In 1978, The Awakening Land trilogy was adapted as a three-part television miniseries of the same name. Starring Elizabeth Montgomery and Hal Holbrook, the miniseries aired from Feb. 19 to Feb. 21 on NBC. It was nominated for several Emmy Awards.

== Differences between books and TV adaptation ==
- Several characters in the books were dropped from the TV miniseries because of the constraints of time and budget. The Luckett family is reduced to four daughters; Wyitt, Sayward’s brother, is omitted.
- In the miniseries, the father, Worth Luckett, returns after the search for the youngest daughter, Sulie, and does not leave until both Genny and Sayward are married (in the book, Worth abandons the family right after Sulie disappears). In both versions, Worth eventually returns to visit years later.
- In the book, Worth tells his surviving daughters before his death that he found their sister, Sulie, living with a Lenape (Delaware Indian) man; she was fully assimilated to the tribe. Sayward and Genny then take a trip to visit Sulie where she lives in Indiana, with disappointing results. In the miniseries, Sulie disappears altogether, and Worth survives to see Sayward and her family move into their new town mansion.
- In the miniseries, Sayward’s husband, Portius, says that he left Massachusetts and cut ties with his family because he was ashamed that his father had gained his wealth through secretly dealing in slaves. In the book trilogy, Portius never reveals his past, and Sayward does not ask him about it.
- In the miniseries, Sayward cuts off conjugal relations with Portius because she is having obstetrical problems; she refuses his offer to go to a doctor. In the book, Sayward simply tells Portius she does not want any more children - ceasing sex is the only reliable form of birth control available to them.
- In the miniseries, Portius offers to send his mistress, Miss Bartram, to another town when their affair results in her pregnancy; she refuses and asks him to leave Sayward and marry her. None of this occurs in the book.
- In the miniseries, Sayward discovers her husband’s affair when she accidentally sees the couple kissing. In the book, she learns about it through town gossip.
- In the miniseries, Sayward sends Portius away on a long business trip after her discovery of his affair. She sleeps apart from him even after his return and returns to his bed only after he almost dies from fever. In the book, the couple never separate, and Sayward returns to Portius’ bed sooner; she feels partially responsible for his affair as she had denied him sex.
- In the book, the subplot involving Chancey and his half-sister, Rosa Tench, ends when they are young adults; Rosa kills herself when she realizes Chancey will never run away with her. In the miniseries, Chancey and Rosa are still children when she dies by drowning in the river. Chancey had told her they were forbidden to play together anymore; it is not clear whether her death was deliberate or accidental. Chancey and Rosa probably remained children in the miniseries screenplay in order to conform to the time constraints in the television version, which ends the story of the Wheelers at a much earlier point than in the novels.
- In the miniseries, Portius tries to make amends for his treatment of Rosa by writing an apology to her family and having her buried in his family burial ground instead of a pauper’s grave. None of this occurs in the book.
- The book trilogy follows Sayward’s life until her death. The miniseries ends her story earlier, concluding with her family’s move into their town mansion.

== Editions of book trilogy ==
The Ohio University Press released paperback editions of The Awakening Land trilogy on May 1, 1991. In 2017, Chicago Review Press released editions reprinted from the Knopf editions. David McCullough provided the introduction.

== See also ==
- The Awakening Land: 1978 TV miniseries based on the trilogy.
