= Porpentine =

Porpentine is an archaic term for a porcupine.

Porpentine may also refer to:

- Porpentine Charity Heartscape, a writer, video game designer, and artist
- The Porpentine, an inn in William Shakespeare's play The Comedy of Errors
- Porpentine, a fictional character in Thomas Pynchon's spy novella "Under the Rose"
- The Porpentine, a magical jewel in Neil Gaiman's graphic novel The Sandman: A Game of You
- Frederico the Porpentine, a fictional character in Dan Wickenden's children's fantasy novel The Amazing Vacation

== See also ==
- Porpentina Goldstein, fictional character in Fantastic Beasts and Where to Find Them (film)
