= The Town (Richter novel) =

1950 novel by Conrad Richter

- First edition
- Author: Conrad Richter
- Language: English
- Publisher: Alfred A. Knopf
- Publication date: 1950
- Publication place: United States
- English publication date: 24 April 1950
- Media type: Print (Hardback & Paperback)
- Pages: 433
- Preceded by: The Trees, The Fields

The Town (1950) is a novel written by American author Conrad Richter. It is the third installment of his trilogy The Awakening Land. The Trees (1940) and The Fields (1946) were the earlier portions of the series. The Town was awarded the Pulitzer Prize for Fiction in 1951.

In September 1966, its publisher Alfred A. Knopf reissued the trilogy for the first time as a single hardcover volume. According to the edition notice of this all-in-one version—which lists the original publication dates of the three books—The Town was first published on 24 April 1950.

== Plot ==
The Town, the third novel in Conrad Richter's Awakening Land trilogy, continues the story of frontier woman Sayward (née Luckett) Wheeler and her family. At 280 pages, the book is considerably longer than the other books of the trilogy. The focus of this final book is on the dramatic changes to the town and region with rapid development and industrialization. The theme is dealing with change. Sayward lives through the development of her Ohio Valley settlement into a thriving town, with a variety of businesses and industry. She becomes wealthy by pioneer standards by selling off parcels of her own land to newcomers.

The town changes its name from Moonshine Church to Americus in a successful quest to be named the county seat. The town government constructs civic improvements, such as a new bridge and canal. Sayward's husband, Portius Wheeler, convinces her to give up their old log cabin and move into a fine new brick mansion house he builds in the downtown section of Americus. He believes this is in keeping with his position as the town's attorney. Sayward eventually gets used to the luxury of her new home, but also feels a sense of loss for her former frontier way of life.

Sayward is reunited with two long-lost members of her family, who were introduced in the earlier books of the trilogy. Her father, Worth Luckett, had abandoned the family to live a hunter's life after his favorite child, Sulie, was lost in the forest. After an absence of many years, he returns to Americus and tries to re-establish relationships with his grown children. On his deathbed, Worth confides that he found their sister Sulie alive; she had become fully assimilated as a Lenape (Delaware Indian) and married a Lenape man. Sayward and her remaining sister, Genny, travel to the Indiana town where Sulie resides and try to reconnect with her. Sulie claims not to know them as she is now part of the tribe and does not want to leave. Her sisters conclude Sulie is lost to them.

Sayward also deals with the problems of one or another of her nine surviving children. Her youngest son, Chancey, causes her the most worry. He is a quiet, sensitive youngster with frequent health problems. He often retreats into daydreams of belonging to another family who will understand him better.

As Chancey grows older, he feels an increasing sense of separation from his family, and often clashes with his mother over their differing views on work and progress. He becomes close friends with Rosa Tench, a girl from the poor side of town in whom he senses a kindred spirit. Their families finally tell him that Rosa is the result of Portius Wheeler's extramarital affair with the local school mistress, meaning that Rosa and Chancey are half-brother and sister. They are forbidden to see each other and are threatened with the law, but they continue to meet in secret.

Finally, Chancey tells Rosa he can't see her anymore. At the town fair, Rosa tries to force a confrontation with him, cutting loose their hot air balloon. Chancey deflates the balloon and returns them safely. When Rosa realizes that Chancey will never defy his family and take her away from Americus, she commits suicide with the same knife used to cut the balloon's tether. (This plot-line was not in the 1978 TV mini-series of the same name, where the pair were separated as children, not young adults.)

After Rosa's death, Chancey becomes embittered toward his family and moves out to a boarding house in town. He then moves on to the larger river port city of Cincinnati, where he becomes a journalist. He works as an editor of a newspaper, writing articles from a socialist point of view that criticize industrial progress and some prominent people in the state, especially members of his family. He returns to see his family only when necessary.

Chancey returns in 1861 on the eve of the American Civil War (although the year is not given, the book refers to Union troops answering the call of their “backwoods president,” meaning Abraham Lincoln). He has come for his mother's last days. After being supported for years by anonymous contributions, his newspaper has failed and been sold off at auction after the contributions stopped. He hopes that he may inherit some money from Sayward's estate to enable him to start over.

At home, Chancey learns that his mother had been the anonymous contributor who financed his paper all those years. He had often criticized her in print, and she did not agree with his published views. He also learns that she has saved clippings of all of the poems, articles, and editorials he has written. Chancey realizes that he may have been wrong about his mother, and therefore wrong about many of his other conclusions. He recognizes that he will have to “ponder his own questions and travel his way alone.”

== Writing style ==
Richter conducted extensive research in order to convey the historic speech of the early 19th-century pioneers of the Ohio Valley, many of whom originally emigrated from Pennsylvania and the Upper South (for example, they referred to “trees” as “butts”). Richter drew from his research in rare collections of old manuscripts, letters, and records that documented the speech of early 18th- and 19th-century residents. His sources included Historical Collections of Ohio by Henry Howe and Pioneer Pennsylvania, a compilation of archaic Pennsylvanian slang by Henry W. Shoemaker. In addition, he interviewed scholars and former neighbors of pioneer heritage whom he had known in his home state of Pennsylvania and in the Ohio Valley.

Richter wrote that this early form of spoken language no longer survived in the Ohio Valley. He learned that it was found in some areas of the South and Southwestern parts of the country. He noted that, although it is often mistaken for a "native" form of speech there, it should be considered “a living reminder of the great mother tongue of early America.”

In keeping up with the passage of time, Richter uses the “pioneer” form of speech in The Town less frequently than in earlier books of the trilogy. By this time, Sayward's husband, her children, and many of the newcomers to the town are better educated and have abandoned the old forms of expression. Toward the end of the book, Sayward is one of the few surviving members of the founding generation of the town. Richter expresses only her thoughts and speech in the “pioneer” dialect.

== Major themes ==
=== Change and nostalgia ===
The central character, Sayward Luckett Wheeler, contributes to the transformation of the frontier settlement founded by her father into a full-fledged town with a church, a school, frame and brick houses, businesses, and improvements such as roads, bridges, canals, a railroad, and a county courthouse – all within her lifespan of some eighty-odd years. Although Sayward at first welcomes the development as a promise of prosperity and improved lives, by the end of the trilogy, she questions whether the rapid changes have fostered traits such as greed and laziness in the townspeople.

Her changing feelings are symbolized by her attitude toward the trees of the dense forest her family found as pioneers. The original settlers cut them down in a wide area, first for homesteads and then to cultivate more crops and land. Later, additional land is cleared as the town of Americus develops. In the beginning, Sayward has an almost personal animosity toward the trees, because of the backbreaking labor they required as settlers struggled to clear the land for homes and farms. Toward the end of the trilogy, Sayward is mourning the loss of the huge old trees:

"She had thought it then a wonderful sight to see, a place free of the lonesome gloom of the deep woods, and nary a big butt (tree) to have to cut down and burn up. But she didn't know how much she liked it now. . . Now why did she think all her life that trees were savage and cruel?. . . Maybe she was just homesick for when she was young."

Realizing what they mean to her, she finds several young trees on the outskirts of land she used to own. She transplants them into the front and sideyards of her town house. On her deathbed, before she loses the power of speech, she asks for her bed to be moved so that she can see the trees to her last breath.

=== Pioneer vs. modern generation ===
Sayward believes that the original settlers built character by their hard work and persistence in the face of adversity. By contrast, the new generation of town settlers seems untested. To her mind, they are taking advantage of the work done by people before them, and have not made equivalent contributions or sacrifices. Contemporary life seems easy by contrast.

“What gave folks ‘narve strings’ today and made them soft so they couldn’t stand what folks could when she was young? . . . It had taken a wild and rough land to breed the big butts (trees) she saw when first she came here, and she reckoned it took a rough and hard life to breed the kind of folks she knew as a young woman. If you made it easy for folks, it seemed like their hardihood had to pay for it.”

By comparison, her youngest son, Chancey, follows the Socialist beliefs of reformer Robert Owen. He believes that the goal of the community should be sharing labor for the benefit of all, that progress means that work could be rewarding in itself, and there should not be wide separation of classes.

“Robert Owen said . . . if you make a man happy, you make him virtuous. (He) said that one of the main occupations of working people should be play. . . Everybody can choose his own work and do as little of it as he wants to. . . Of course there’ll have to be a little repulsive labor at first. But progress will do away with all toil and labor in time. . . Everybody will share alike. There’ll be no rich people and no poor people, just brothers and sisters. And everybody will have security and happiness.”

== Editions ==
The Ohio University Press released paperback editions of The Awakening Land trilogy in 1991. Chicago Review Press issued reprints of the original Knopf editions in 2017.

== See also ==
- The Awakening Land: The 1978 miniseries based on the trilogy.
