= The Light in the Forest (film) =

1958 film by Herschel Daugherty

- Theatrical release poster
- Directed by: Herschel Daugherty
- Written by: Lawrence Edward Watkin
- Based on: novel by Conrad Richter
- Produced by: Walt Disney
- Starring: Fess Parker; Wendell Corey; Joanne Dru; James MacArthur; Jessica Tandy
- Cinematography: Ellsworth Fredericks
- Music by: Paul J. Smith; Franklyn Marks (orchestration)
- Production company: Walt Disney Productions
- Distributed by: Buena Vista Film Distribution Co., Inc.
- Release date: July 8, 1958
- Running time: 94 minutes
- Country: United States
- Language: English
- Box office: $2 million

The Light in the Forest is a 1958 American Western historical fiction drama film based on a novel of the same name first published in 1953 by American author Conrad Richter. The film was produced by Walt Disney Productions and stars Fess Parker, Joanne Dru, James MacArthur and Wendell Corey. Though it is a work of fiction and primarily features fictional characters, the novel incorporates several real people and facts from American history.

== Plot ==
In 1764 Pennsylvania, a young white boy raised by Native Americans and given the name True-son, is forced to return to white society following the signing of a peace treaty.

True-son (whose birth name was Johnny) not wanting to leave his adoptive Indian family, tries to kill himself by eating a poisonous plant on the march back to his white family. Del stops him.

True-son's Indian cousin joins him on the way to bring him gifts and messages from his Indian father. After True-son/Johnny's Indian cousin goes as far as he is allowed to go, Johnny's biological father comes to take him home. Del goes along to help, due to Johnny's resistance.

He struggles to adjust to his white family and the towns people. One man in particular, his uncle Wilsey Owens, makes it especially hard for Johnny, and treats him like a "dirty Indian".

A girl in the employ of the Wilsey Owen's family, Shenandoe, was orphaned when her whole family was killed/scalped by the Indians. She is obviously afraid of Native Americans and Johnny, but soon comes to realize they have many things in common and learns to love Johnny. Wilsey is jealous of Johnny and Shenandoe's affection for each other as he has eyes for her himself.

As Shenandoe and Johnny were confessing their love for each other and kissed for the first time, Johnny's Indian cousin and another Indian friend comes to find him. Uncle Wilsey shoots the Indian friend. Johnny and his cousin hit Wilsey and knock him out to keep him from killing Johnny's cousin as well. His cousin suggests scalping Wilsey, but Johnny stops him.

Johnny and his cousin run away together, back to his Indian family. The brother of the Indian who was killed by Wilsey wants revenge, 20 white scalps. They kill and scalp 15, including children, which upsets Johnny. They attempt to get 5 more scalps but Johnny warns the white people there is an ambush ahead, incurring the wrath of his Indian family. His whole Indian tribe, including his cousin, votes to kill Johnny, but his Indian father stands up for him. Afterward though his Indian father says that he is no longer his son, nor he his father and that he needs to go back to his white family.

Johnny goes back to his family with Del who has come to find him. Del and Johnny accuse Wilsey of killing the Indian needlessly which caused the Indians to scalp the white settlers. Wilsey is angry starts a fight with Del, but Johnny said the fight is his as it was his Indian friend. Johnny, who didn't know how to fist fight, was instructed by Del in his Indian language so that Wilsey could not understand. Del and Shenandoe told Johnny to hit Wilsey once for them as well. Johnny won the fight and Uncle Wilsey extended his hand. Johnny shook his hand and then he and Shenandoe ran off hand in hand.

== Cast ==
- Fess Parker as Del Hardy
- Wendell Corey as Wilsey Owens
- Joanne Dru as Milly Elder
- James MacArthur as Johnny Butler/True Son
- Jessica Tandy as Myra Butler
- John McIntire as John Elder
- Joseph Calleia as Chief Cuyloga
- Carol Lynley as Shenandoe
- Rafael Campos as Half Arrow
- Frank Ferguson as Harry Butler
- Dean Fredericks as Niskitoon
- Marian Seldes as Kate Owens
- Stephen Bekassy as Col. Henry Bouquet
- Sam Buffington as George Owens

== Production ==
The film was based on a novel by Conrad Richter that was published in 1953. A sequel, A Country of Strangers, was published in 1966.

Disney bought the film rights in June 1953 but announced that it would not make the film until 1957.

In October 1955, the film was in "preparation". In March 1956, Fess Parker, who had played Davy Crockett for Disney, was announced as the film's star, and a search was begun for the male lead. Filming was to begin in July, but was delayed.

By May 1957, the lead role was given to James MacArthur, the son of Helen Hayes and Charles MacArthur, who had recently appeared in The Young Stranger. MacArthur was under a five-year contract with RKO and was a college student at Harvard University, so he made the film during his summer vacation. He signed a three-picture deal with Disney when he was cast.

Filming began in July 1957 and took place in California and Lookout Valley (Chattanooga), Tennessee.

The film's screenplay expands the role of Del Hardy, portrayed by Parker, who remains with the Butler family much longer than he does in the novel. True Son's blood brother Gordon does not appear in the film. The character of Shenandoe, Uncle Wilse's indentured servant, was added as a love interest for True Son. In the film, the antagonism between True Son and Wilse culminates in a fistfight rather than in Wilse's scalping, as in the book. While the novel ends on a note of uncertainty, with True Son alone on a remote road and unsure where his future lies, the film has him return to his family, to Shenandoe and, presumably, to life on a plot of wild land that his father has had deeded to him.

The film's title song was written by Lawrence Edward Watkin, Paul J. Smith and Hazel "Gil" George.

== Premiere ==
The film premiered in Harrisburg, Pennsylvania on July 9, 1958 at the Senate Theater with actor Wendell Corey and his wife and some Mouseketeers such as Jimmie Dodd, Annette Funicello, Tommy Cole, and Doreen Tracey in attendance.

== Reception ==
Bosley Crowther of The New York Times wrote that the film was "talky (much of which is quite hard to understand) and the dramatic incidents are less vivid than they ordinarily are in Disney films. However, the whole thing is wholesome, in a nice, simple, outdoor way, and the scenery is pretty in color. It should entertain the kids."

Variety reported that the film had "the same wholesome adventure qualities that distinguished Old Yeller. Like most Disney productions, it is pastoral in quality, almost fable-like in its gentle approach to some basically bitter situations, but it is well-paced, has capable acting and a brace of marquee names, plus wide screen and Technicolor."

Geoffrey Warren of the Los Angeles Times wrote that James MacArthur and Carol Lynley were "real charmers with more than their share of talent". He found Herschel Daugherty's direction "outstanding" and Lawrence Edward Watkin's screenplay "quite good".

The Monthly Film Bulletin observed: "Dramatically, its action is limited and uneventful. But the scenes in the forest are shot with a fresh eye for natural beauty, and children might well find the film enjoyable. The acting, in spite of the presence of skillful players Wendell Corey and Jessica Tandy, is seldom more than competent."
