= The Sea of Grass (film) =

1947 Western movie directed by Elia Kazan

- Directed by: Elia Kazan
- Screenplay by: Vincent Lawrence; Marguerite Roberts; Edward E. Paramore Jr.
- Based on: The Sea of Grass; 1937 novel by Conrad Richter
- Produced by: Pandro S. Berman
- Starring: Katharine Hepburn; Spencer Tracy; Robert Walker; Melvyn Douglas; Phyllis Thaxter; Edgar Buchanan; Harry Carey; Ruth Nelson; Robert Armstrong
- Cinematography: Harry Stradling
- Edited by: Robert Kern
- Music by: Herbert Stothart
- Production company: Metro-Goldwyn-Mayer
- Distributed by: Loew's Inc.
- Release dates: January 20, 1947 (United Kingdom): April 25, 1947
- Running time: 123 minutes
- Country: United States
- Language: English
- Budget: $2,349,000
- Box office: $4,689,000

The Sea of Grass is a 1947 American Western film set in the American Southwest. It was directed by Elia Kazan and based on the 1936 novel of the same name by Conrad Richter. The film stars Katharine Hepburn, Spencer Tracy, and Melvyn Douglas.

Kazan was reportedly displeased with the resulting film and discouraged people from seeing it.

== Plot ==
In St. Louis, Missouri, on Lutie Cameron's wedding day, she receives a telegram from her fiancé, cattle rancher Col. Brewton, telling her to board the train for New Mexico to marry him in the small town of Salt Fork. The first person she meets in town is Brice Chamberlain, who warns her of likely unhappiness with Brewton, locally considered a tyrant.

Chamberlain escorts Lutie to the courthouse, where a judge is dismissing charges against several of Jim's men. They were accused of harassing homesteaders, who filed claims on Jim's land, until they left; all charges were dismissed for lack of evidence. Jim is triumphant and exults when he sees Lutie in the crowd.

At the ranch, Brewton takes her out to see the prairie. He thinks it is beautiful and runs his cattle on government-owned land, abutting his own claims (some owned by his hired men). He opposes homesteaders because he believes the Great Plains do not get enough rain to sustain farming. His opinion is opposed by the locals, including Chamberlain. Lutie is not sure if she agrees with Jim or not.

Lutie becomes very lonely, living far from town and female company. Brewton is often away on the range with his men and the cattle. She befriends a displaced homestead couple, Sam and Selina Hall, and persuades Brewton to allow them to settle on his ranch.

When she visits them one day, she is surprised to see Chamberlain, who rides with her on her way home and confesses his attraction to her. Lutie confesses her struggles to adapt to her new home and her husband's emotional distance, while rejecting his advances. She gives birth to a daughter, Sara Beth.

During a blizzard, the Halls are alarmed by the sound of Brewton's cattle near their house. Fearful for his wheat crop, Sam goes out of the house with his rifle, planning to scare off the cattle. When they stampede, he shoots and kills one of the cows, which results in Brewton's men striking him with their gun butts. His pregnant wife then goes into the storm to carry him back into the house, and she consequently loses her baby. Having lost their crop and baby, they are broken and concede the land to Brewton. Lutie tries to talk to Selina, but the Halls decide to sever ties with her.

Brewton tells Lutie that he warned her that the settlers faced severe challenges and the land would beat them. Furious with him, Lutie decides to leave Salt Fork for a while and goes to Denver. While planning to return to St. Louis, she runs into Chamberlain. The two have a discreet affair, and Lutie returns to Brewton, where she gives birth to a boy named Brock. During the birth, she becomes hysterical and confesses that Brock is Chamberlain's child to her doctor, Doc Neil. Brewton overhears. Doc Neil tells him to forget what Lutie said, as women often are hysterical during childbirth and hallucinate from pain, but Brewton ignores him. From then on, he regards Lutie and Brock suspiciously.

Two years pass. Chamberlain lobbies for a Federal District Court in Salt Fork, and he wins election as its judge. Brewton believes that Chamberlain will decide in favor of settlers on "his" land. One day, a large group of homesteaders arrive. As he arms himself and his men to ward off the settlers, Lutie pleads with him to reconsider. They argue, and Brewton forces Lutie to confess to the affair with Chamberlain. Brewton refuses to believe that Lutie loves him as she doesn not agree with him about the prairie. She does not want to leave but agrees to; he refuses to let her take the children, who are two and four.

Back in St. Louis, Lutie consults a lawyer. He says that if Lutie testifies that Chamberlain is Brock's father, she could win custody of her son but lose custody of Sara Beth. Convinced that fighting would cause too much damage to her children, Lutie stays away. Chamberlain tries to get her to fight for Brock's custody so they can run away together as a family, but Lutie does not love him enough to marry him. With Doc Reid's help, she visits Salt Fork when the children are five and three, but they do not remember her.

During the next decade, Chamberlain permits homesteaders to farm. Drought occurs, and crops fail. Salt Fork, once prosperous, takes a downward turn. First Doc Reid, then Chamberlain send Lutie news of Brock and Sara Beth. Sara Beth has done well, eventually going to college at 16. Brock, however, was bullied by townsfolk about his "real father.” Hotheaded, he fights anyone who insults him.

Sara Beth graduates college at 20 and returns to Salt Fork. Brock, a young adult, is a womanizer and gambler. During a card game, his opponent refers to Brock as "judge", referring to Chamberlain. Brock gets drawn into conflict and when his opponent draws his pistol, Brock shoots him fatally. He flees, wanting to spare Brewton the humiliation of being called "Chamberlain"'s son in a public trial. The pursuing posse shoots and kills him. Brock and Brewton reconcile shortly before his death.

Having read in the newspaper that Brock was on the run, Lutie returns to Salt Fork. Just before arriving, she learns that he has been killed. Sara Beth visits her mother, warning her against trying to see Brewton and stirring up more trouble. Lutie tells Sara Beth that she is glad that Brewton will have his daughter to love him. Lutie still loves him and finally understands how he feels about the sea of grass. Sara Beth breaks down and invites her mother back to the house, where she reconciles with Brewton.

== Cast ==
- Spencer Tracy as Col. Jim Brewton
- Katharine Hepburn as Lutie Cameron
- Robert Walker as Brock Brewton
- Melvyn Douglas as Brice Chamberlain
- Phyllis Thaxter as Sarah Beth Brewton
- Edgar Buchanan as Jeff
- Harry Carey as Doc Reid
- Ruth Nelson as Selina Hall
- Robert Armstrong as Floyd McCurtin
- James Bell as Sam Hall
- Robert Barrat as Judge White
- Charles Trowbridge as George Cameron
- Russell Hicks as Major Harney
- Trevor Bardette as Andy Boggs
- Morris Ankrum as Crane
- George H. Reed as Uncle Nat (uncredited)

== Production ==
In his autobiography, Kazan wrote that he had been excited at the prospect of filming The Sea of Grass. He was looking forward to working on the Great Plains, "where the grass still grew from unbroken sod." However, Kazan was extremely disappointed when informed that MGM had decided that the majority of the film would be shot against a process screen to use some of the existing "ten thousand feet" of 'sea of grass' stock footage, rather than sending the film crew on location. According to The Films of Katharine Hepburn, MGM had thousands of reels of footage of prairie. Kazan also did not like the costumes, which he did not get to see until shortly before filming was to begin. He believed the producers had approved clothes for Katharine Hepburn that in design and quantity did not fit the frontier environment, but changes were restricted due to production deadlines. The 'Sea of Grass' scenes used as process screen backdrop were shot in the Sandhills of Nebraska on the ranch of former Nebraska Governor Samuel McKelvie. There is no little irony that a story based in New Mexico exclaiming the Great Plains are cattle country was using a backdrop that later became part of the McKelvie National Forest.

The role of Lutie Cameron was originally planned for Myrna Loy.

== Reception ==
Although The Sea of Grass received mostly tepid critical reviews, it was the most commercially successful of all the Tracy-Hepburn MGM films, making $3,150,000 in the US and Canada and $1,539,000 overseas, resulting in a profit of $742,000 to MGM. Kazan reportedly did not like the finished film and advised friends against seeing it.
