= Conrad Richter =

American novelist

- Born: Conrad Michael Richter; October 13, 1890; Pine Grove, Pennsylvania, U.S.
- Died: October 30, 1968 (aged 78); Pottsville, Pennsylvania, U.S.
- Occupation: Novelist
- Years active: 1924–1968
- Known for: The Sea of Grass, The Light in the Forest, The Town, The Awakening Land
- Spouse: Harvena Achenbach (died 1972)
- Children: 1

Conrad Michael Richter (October 13, 1890 – October 30, 1968) was an American novelist whose lyrical work is concerned largely with life on the American frontier in various periods. His novel The Town (1950), the last story of his trilogy The Awakening Land about the Ohio frontier, won the 1951 Pulitzer Prize for Fiction. His novel The Waters of Kronos won the 1961 National Book Award for Fiction. Two collections of short stories were published posthumously during the 20th century, and several of his novels have been reissued during the 21st century by academic presses.

== Early life ==
Conrad Michael Richter was born in 1890 in Pine Grove, Pennsylvania, near Pottsville, to John Absalom Richter, a Lutheran minister, and Charlotte Esther (née Henry) Richter. Coming from a long line of Pennsylvania Dutch ancestors, his grandfather, uncle and great-uncle were also Lutheran ministers and descended from German colonial immigrants. As a child, Richter lived with his family in several small central Pennsylvania mining towns, where he encountered descendants of pioneers of the eighteenth and nineteenth centuries who shared family stories. These inspired him later to write historical fiction set in changing American frontiers. Attending local public schools, Richter finished his formal education when he graduated from high school at age fifteen.

== Early career, marriage and move to New Mexico ==
At the age of 19, Richter started working as an editor of a local weekly newspaper, the Patton, Pennsylvania, Courier. In 1911 Richter relocated to Cleveland, Ohio, and worked as the private secretary to a wealthy manufacturing family. Richter married Harvena Maria Achenbach in 1915. They had their only child, Harvena Richter, in 1917. Richter worked subsequently for a small publishing company, initiated a juvenile magazine, and started writing short stories. During the 1930s, he also performed two brief stints as a screenwriter for Metro-Goldwyn-Mayer Studios in Hollywood, California.

Richter continued writing and trying to sell short stories. In 1913, a young Conrad Richter sent manuscripts to literary editor Frederic Taber Cooper. Responding to Richter's letter, Cooper writes that he does not give “gratuitous opinions on manuscripts, either to friends or strangers ... I suspect that your main difficulty is that, in straining after originality, you fail to make your stories ring true. Try to be simpler.” His short story "Brothers of No Kin," published in Forum magazine in 1914, was included in the "Roll of Honor for 1914" of American stories by Edward J. O'Brien, editor of the Best Short Stories of 1915. O'Brien wrote in his "Introduction" that Richter's story was the best of all those published in 1914; the editor was explicitly concerned with the development of an "American literature" and considered Richter as integral to this. This short story was re-issued as the title story of a posthumous collection published in 1973.

In 1928 Richter relocated to Albuquerque, New Mexico, for the sake of his wife's health. During this period, he also collected much material from which he created short stories about the Southwest frontier days. By 1933, Richter and his wife had returned to live in his hometown of Pine Grove, Pennsylvania. They subsequently alternated between Pine Grove, Albuquerque, and Florida.

== Writing career ==
During the early 1930s, Richter had numerous stories published in pulp magazines such as Triple-X, Short Stories, Complete Stories, Ghost Stories, and Blue Book. His Early Americana and Other Stories (1936) was considered his first successful book.

He persisted with his work, gradually writing and publishing full-length novels. Richter set his novels in different periods of American history on its changing frontier. He may be best known for The Sea of Grass (1936), set in late nineteenth-century New Mexico, and featuring conflict between ranchers and farmers. It was later adapted as a movie of the same name, directed by Elia Kazan and featuring Katharine Hepburn and Spencer Tracy, released in 1947.

Richter's novel The Light in the Forest (1953), set in late eighteenth-century Pennsylvania and Ohio, featured challenges faced by a young white man who had become an assimilated Lenape Amerindian after being taken captive as a child. After the boy was returned as a youth to white culture, he was considered suspicious. This novel also became very popular and had a second life as a movie, released in 1958. Richter returned to the topic of the white child raised in an alien culture in his later novel A Country of Strangers (1966). As noted by Ernest Cady in his review in the Columbus Dispatch, both books were written from the point of view of Indians. He wrote of Richter,

He simply tells how he thinks things were for both Indians and whites, in a hard time of violence and danger and change on a raw frontier. And does it so convincingly that the reader senses that this indeed, is how it must have been.

During this period, Richter also published the novels of his trilogy The Awakening Land, about the Ohio frontier: The Trees (1940), The Fields (1946), and The Town (1950). In 1947 he won the Ohioana Book Award for The Fields. The Town was awarded the Pulitzer Prize in 1951. In a review of the last novel, Louis Bromfield, also an Ohio writer and winner of the Pulitzer Prize, wrote of the trilogy:

the three books are not only concerned with Sayward and her family but the growth and the astonishingly rapid development of a whole area which has played a key role in the nation's history… Mr. Richter has reproduced the quality and the speech of these people so well that a thousand years from now, one may read his books and know exactly what these people were like and what it was like to have lived in an era when within three or four generations a frontier wilderness turned into one of the great industrial areas of the earth…. 'The Town' stands on its own as an entity and may be read on its own as a full, rich and comprehensive novel based upon the lives of ordinary people, brave and ever heroic in their own small way...

The trilogy was first published in one volume in 1966 by Alfred A. Knopf. It was adapted as a TV miniseries of the same name in 1978, in which several plot changes were made as a result of the changing social culture of the time, especially concerning race and sexuality.

Richter's short story, "Doctor Hanray's Second Chance", first published in the magazine The Saturday Evening Post in 1950 (June 10), has a theme of reconciling with the past. Richter returned to this theme in his 1960 autobiographical novel, The Waters of Kronos (Chronos). (Chronos was the ancient Greek personification of Time.) This novel won the U.S. National Book Award in 1961.

The short story "Doctor Hanray" was republished in the anthology, The Saturday Evening Post Fantasy Stories (1951) and in several later speculative fiction anthologies published by the Post and others. The Internet Speculative Fiction Database catalogs five of Richter's stories, including a very early one, "The Head of His House", from a 1917 anthology, The Grim Thirteen (Dodd, Mead).

After Richter's death, two short story collections were published posthumously. Additionally, several of his novels have been reissued by academic presses. When The Waters of Kronos was reissued in paperback format in 2003, one reviewer wrote,

To celebrate the reappearance of such a worthy novel may be an expression of regional patriotism, but it should also be an opportunity to think about our own small towns, our own haunted memories, and our own quest for the meaning of the past.

— Jeffrey S. Wood, Cumberland County History

== Bibliography ==
- Early Americana (short stories) (1936)
- The Sea of Grass (1936)
- The Trees (1940)
- Tacey Cromwell (1942)
- The Free Man (1943)
- The Fields (1946)
- Always Young and Fair (1947)
- The Town (1950)
- The Light in the Forest (1953)
- The Mountain on the Desert (1955)
- The Lady (1957)
- The Waters of Kronos (1960/2003)
- A Simple Honorable Man (1962)
- The Grandfathers (1964)
- A Country of Strangers (1966)
- The Awakening Land (trilogy in single volume, 1966/1991 revised paperback edition/2017 trade paperback editions reprinted from original Knopf editions)
- The Aristocrat (1968)
- Brothers of No Kin and Other Stories (posthumous short story collection, 1973)
- The Rawhide Knot and Other Stories (posthumous short story collection, 1985)

The Sea of Grass, The Trees and Tacey Cromwell were published as Armed Services Editions during WWII.

== Legacy and honors ==
Richter received national and regional literary awards, and several honorary doctorates.

- 1937 – National Book Award nomination for The Sea of Grass.
- 1942 – Gold Medal for Literature from Society of Libraries of New York University, for The Sea of Grass and The Trees.
- 1947 – Ohioana Library Medal for The Fields.
- 1951 – Pulitzer Prize for Fiction for The Town.
- 1959 – National Institute of Arts and Letters grant for literature.
- 1959 – Maggie Award for The Lady.
- 1961 – National Book Award for The Waters of Kronos.
- 1944 – Litt.D., Susquehanna University.
- 1958 – Litt.D., University of New Mexico.
- 1966 – Litt.D., Lafayette College.
- 1966 – LL.D., Temple University.
- 1966 – L.H.D., Lebanon Valley College.
- 1967 – Florence R. Head Memorial Award from the Martha Kinney Cooper Ohioana Association.
