= The Travels of Jaimie McPheeters =

1958 novel by Robert Lewis Taylor

- First edition cover
- Author: Robert Lewis Taylor
- Language: English
- Genre: Historical novel
- Publisher: Doubleday
- Publication date: 1958
- Publication place: United States
- Media type: Print (hardback and paperback) and audiobook (audio cassette)
- Pages: 544 pages

The Travels of Jaimie McPheeters is a Pulitzer Prize-winning novel written by Robert Lewis Taylor, published in 1958. It was later made into a short-running television series on ABC from September 1963 through March 1964, featuring Kurt Russell as Jaimie, Dan O'Herlihy as his father, "Doc" Sardius McPheeters, and Michael Witney and Charles Bronson as the wagon masters, Buck Coulter and Linc Murdock, respectively.

== Plot analysis ==
The novel, aimed at an adult audience and containing episodes that would have kept it off any school list at the time, was published in 1958 and won the Pulitzer Prize for Fiction the following year. In it, the young Jaimie (spelled with two "i"s) accompanies a wagon train headed from St. Louis, Missouri, to California after the 1849 Gold Rush.

The novel alternates between Jaimie describing his journey by wagon train and commentary by his father, a Scottish doctor with an effervescent personality whose judgment is often clouded by his weakness for gambling and strong drink.

The novel contains, in graphic detail, some intense Native American customs, especially rites of passage.

== Publishing history ==
- Doubleday & Company. 1st edition. 1958. ISBN 1-141-39958-X. (may also be: ISBN 0-385-04930-7.)
- Pocket. 1960. Paperback. ISBN 1-122-55331-5.
- Arbor House. 1985. Paperback. ISBN 0-87795-756-8.
- Main Street Books. Paperback reissue edition. 544 pages. December 1, 1992. ISBN 0-385-42222-9.
- Chivers Audio Books. Audio cassette. October 1993. ISBN 1-56054-867-3.
