= The Fields (novel) =

1946 novel by Conrad Richter

- First edition
- Author: Conrad Richter
- Language: English
- Publisher: Alfred A. Knopf
- Publication date: 1946
- Publication place: United States
- English publication date: March 28, 1946
- Media type: Print (hardback and paperback)
- Preceded by: The Trees
- Followed by: The Town

The Fields is a 1946 novel by Conrad Richter and the second work in his trilogy The Awakening Land. It continues the story of the characters Portius and Sayward Luckett Wheeler begun in the novel The Trees.

== Plot ==
The Fields is set on the frontier in a fictional county near what is now Ross County, Ohio. Its action begins almost immediately after the conclusion of The Trees, a few weeks after the marriage of protagonist Sayward Luckett and her husband, lawyer Portius Wheeler. The action of the novel spans a much longer period of time than its predecessor, covering approximately 20 years of their marriage as the couple become parents to a very large family.

An influx of new settlers, particularly after Ohio becomes a state, transforms the frontier of the first novel into a small town surrounded by many miles of farms, with a population that is still growing and cheap land that is becoming ever more expensive. Sayward becomes wealthy by frontier standards as the value of the land she received from her father rises and as Portius's law practice becomes successful.

The Wheeler marriage begins to undergo several strains. Portius, an agnostic and an intellectual, was from the beginning an unusual match for the illiterate and devout Sayward. Resentment begins to emerge over their differences in world view and their differing priorities as their children grow up.

Following the birth of their eighth child, Sayward informs Portius that she will no longer sleep in his bed or have sexual relations with him. She is worn-out from bearing and caring for so many children (one of whom died in an accident involving fire). Because there was no reliable form of birth control then, abstinence is the only way she can ensure no further pregnancies.

Eventually, Sayward discovers that Portius has been having an extramarital affair with the town schoolmistress, Miss Bartram (his only intellectual equal in the community), who is expecting his out-of-wedlock child. In order for the child to have a legal surname, Miss Bartram is hastily married to Jake Tench, a laborer who feels he owes an obligation to Portius because he has represented Tench in several lawsuits.

By the end of the novel (approximately 1815, though the date is not given), Sayward has returned to Portius's bed and has given birth to a ninth child. She feels that she is partially to blame for Portius's affair because she denied him conjugal relations, what she refers to as her "secret sin." She and Portius have declared an unspoken truce and live together amicably again, except that they never travel in each other's company if they both have to go to the same place.

"Oh, all was cake and pie between him and her, but seldom did they go anywhere together. No, if both had to go to the same place, they were never ready at the same time. . . Oh, everything was fine as silk between them again. You couldn't tell a lick anything had ever been wrong, not when they were in the cabin. But when they went outside there was just this small thing between them for the sake of feeling right in front of other folks. It couldn't be . . . that she had almost let Portius off, but not quite?"

The story of the Wheeler family is continued in the final work of the trilogy, The Town.

== Writing style ==
Richter conducted extensive research in order to convey in his writing the mode of speech of the early 19th-century pioneers of the Ohio Valley, many of whom originally emigrated from Pennsylvania and the Upper South. (For example, they referred to "trees" as "butts".) In order to write a dialect to convey a historic sense, Richter used rare collections of old manuscripts, letters, and records that documented the speech of early 18th- and 19th-century residents. His sources included Historical Collections of Ohio by Henry Howe and Pioneer Pennsylvania, a compilation of archaic Pennsylvanian slang by Henry W. Shoemaker. In addition, he interviewed scholars and former neighbors of pioneer heritage whom he had known in his home state of Pennsylvania and in the Ohio Valley.

Richter wrote that this early form of spoken language no longer survived in the Ohio Valley. He learned that it was found in some areas of the South and Southwestern parts of the country. He noted that, although it is often mistaken for a "native" form of speech there, it should be considered "a living reminder of the great mother tongue of early America."

== Major themes ==
=== Family ===
Sayward values family above all else. She expresses a strong loyalty to the ties of kinship, even if this loyalty is not always returned. Several members of her birth family, such as her father Worth, her brother Wyitt, and her sister Ascha eventually abandon or otherwise leave the family home, with no attempt to maintain communication. Her younger sister, Sulie, is lost to the forest, and eventually becomes assimilated into the Lenape Indian tribe. But Sayward always remembers these absent family members and holds them in her thoughts. When Sayward has problems in her marriage or with her own children, whether due to her husband's infidelity or generational differences, she tries to defuse tensions and ultimately forgives any wrongs committed.

=== Man vs. nature ===
The characters in The Awakening Land deal with the human condition in a setting of great natural challenges as they carve out lives on the frontier. There was a high mortality rate due to disease, warfare, natural disasters, severe weather, and accidents, as well as dangerous animals. They worked to cut down trees and clear the land, to cultivate crops, to care for livestock, and to raise and process all their food. They also had to deal with hostilities from native Indians resisting European-American encroachment. At times they face famine, and natural disasters such as floods.

=== Change and nostalgia ===
The central character, Sayward Luckett Wheeler, witnesses the transformation of the frontier settlement founded by her father into a town with a church, a school, frame and brick houses, businesses, and improvements such as roads, bridges, canals, a railroad, and a county courthouse – all within her lifespan of some eighty-odd years. Although Sayward at first welcomes the development as a promise of prosperity and improved lives, by the end of the trilogy, she questions whether the rapid changes have fostered traits such as greed and laziness in the townspeople.

== Editions ==
The Ohio University Press released paperback editions of The Awakening Land trilogy in 1991. Chicago Review Press issued reprints in 2017 of the original Knopf editions.

== See also ==
- The Awakening Land: The 1978 miniseries based on the trilogy.
