= Joseph Auslander =

American poet

- Born: October 11, 1897; Philadelphia, Pennsylvania, U.S.
- Died: June 22, 1965 (aged 67); Coral Gables, Florida, U.S.
- Education: Harvard University (BA); Sorbonne University
- Occupations: Poet; anthologist; novelist
- Spouse: Audrey Wurdemann

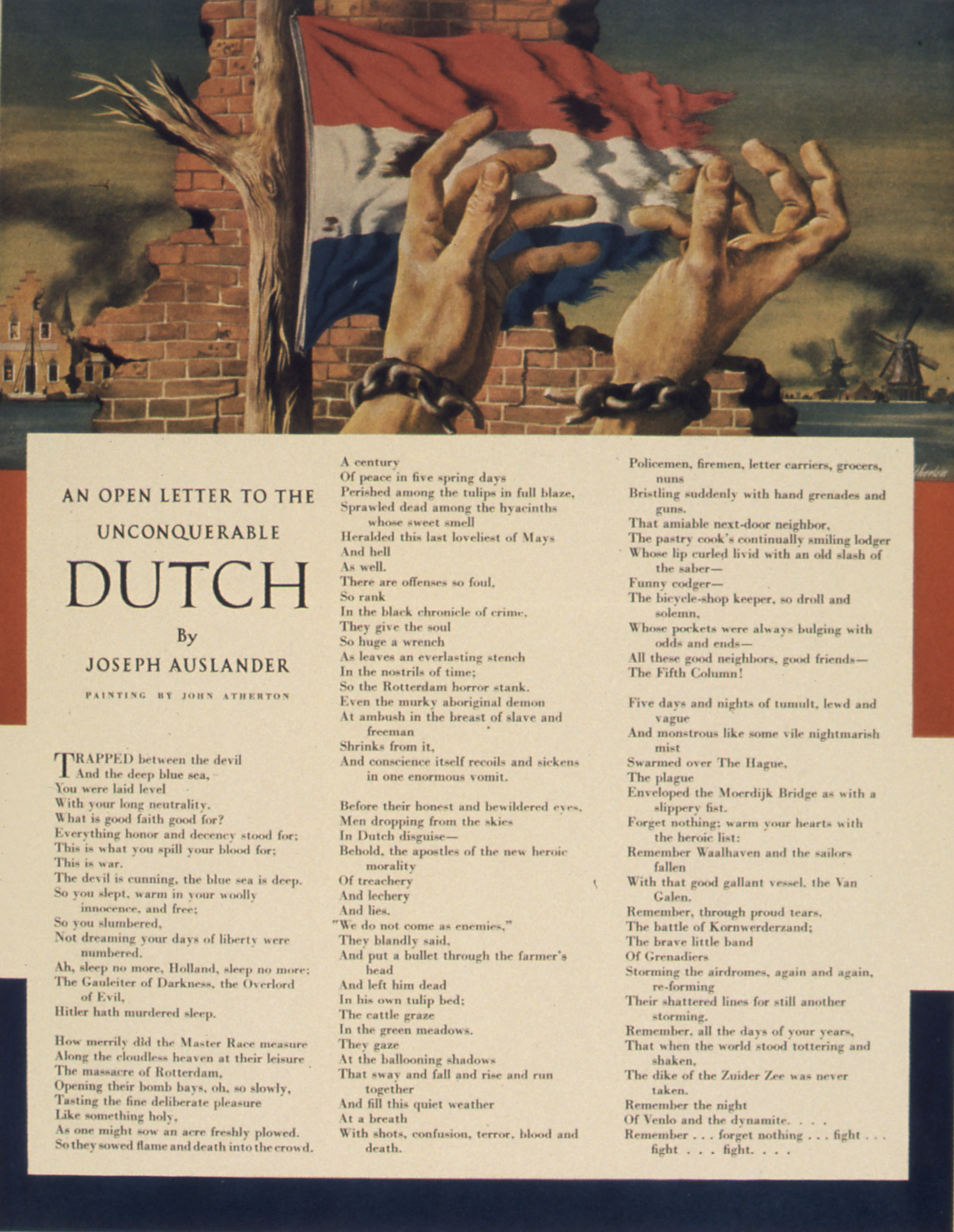
"Open letter" to the Dutch, World War II poster

Joseph Auslander (October 11, 1897 – June 22, 1965) was an American poet, anthologist, translator of poems, and novelist. Auslander was appointed the first Poet Laureate Consultant in Poetry to the Library of Congress from 1937 and 1941.

== Life ==
Joseph Auslander was born to Louis and Martha (Asyueck) Auslander on October 11, 1897, in Philadelphia, Pennsylvania. He graduated from Harvard University in 1917, and in 1919 became an instructor in English at Harvard while engaged in graduate studies. From 1921 to 1922 he attended the Sorbonne in Paris on a Parker fellowship.

In 1930, Auslander married Svanhild Kreutz, who died in childbirth two years later, leaving a daughter, Svanhild Frances Martha. In 1932 Auslander was married to Pulitzer Prize winning poet, Audrey Wurdemann.; The couple had two children, Louis and Mary. From 1937 to 1941, Auslander was the Poet Laureate Consultant in English Poetry for the Library of Congress. During this time, he and Wurdemann lived at 3117 35th Street Northwest, Washington, D.C., in the Cathedral Heights neighborhood.

Auslander's best-known work is "The Unconquerables" (1943), a collection of poems addressed to the German-occupied countries of Europe. He served as the poetry editor for the North American Review and The Measure. Auslander was honored with the Robert Frost Prize for Poetry.

Joseph Auslander died of a heart attack on June 22, 1965, in Coral Gables, Florida.

The papers of Joseph Auslander and Audrey Wurdemann are held at the University of Miami. Additional Auslander papers are held by The Grolier Club.

== Works ==
- Sunrise Trumpets, Harper, 1924
- Cyclop's Eye, Harper & brothers, 1926
- Historia amoris mea, Harold Vinal, 1927
- Letters to Women, Harper & brothers, 1929
- Hell in Harness, Doubleday, Doran & Company, Inc., 1929
- No Traveller Returns: A Book of Poems, Harper & brothers, 1935
- More Than Bread: A Book of Poems. Macmillan company. 1936. ISBN 9781417995660.; Kessinger Publishing, 2004, ISBN 9781417995660
- Riders at the Gate, The Macmillan co., 1938
- The Unconquerables: Salutes to the Undying Spirit of the Nazi-Occupied Countries, Saturday Evening Post, 1941
- "Four Sonnets on the Eve of Invasion", Life, May 22, 1944. p. 40
- (Joseph Auslander; Audrey Wurdemann) My Uncle Jan,: A Novel, Longmans, Green and Company, 1948
- The Islanders, Longmans, Green, 1951

== Other sources ==
- "Poet Laureate Timeline: 1953–1960". Library of Congress. 2008.
