= The Awakening Land =

1978 film

- Genre: Drama
- Based on: The Awakening Land trilogy by Conrad Richter
- Written by: James Lee Barrett; Liam O'Brien
- Directed by: Boris Sagal
- Starring: Elizabeth Montgomery; Hal Holbrook; Jane Seymour
- Theme music composer: Fred Karlin
- Country of origin: United States
- Original language: English
- No. of episodes: 3

Production
- Executive producers: Harry Bernsen; Tom Kuhn; Harry Bernstein
- Producer: Robert E. Relyea
- Production locations: Springfield, Illinois; New Salem, Illinois Petersburg, Illinois
- Cinematography: Michel Hugo
- Editor: Bernard J. Small
- Running time: 420 mins.
- Production companies: Bensen/Kuhn/Sagal Productions; Warner Bros. Television

Original release
- Network: NBC
- Release: February 19 – February 21, 1978

The Awakening Land is a 1978 television miniseries based on Conrad Richter's trilogy of novels: The Trees; The Fields; and The Town, published from 1940 to 1950. The series originally aired on NBC in three installments from February 19 to February 21, 1978; directed by Boris Sagal, it starred Elizabeth Montgomery and Hal Holbrook.

== Premise ==
The storyline follows the struggle of Sayward Luckett (Montgomery) after she travels to the unsettled Ohio Valley frontier from post-revolutionary Pennsylvania. She and her family carve out a homestead in the forest, and a community with other settlers. The series follows Sayward from a young single woman, left with three sisters to raise after their mother dies and their father abandons the family, to a married woman who has her own family of seven. Her faithful devotion to her family is recounted against the day-to-day struggle for survival.

== Main cast ==
- Elizabeth Montgomery ... Sayward Luckett Wheeler
- Hal Holbrook ... Portius Wheeler
- Jane Seymour ... Genny Luckett
- Steven Keats ... Jake Tench
- Louise Latham ... Jary Luckett
- William H. Macy ... Will Beagle
- Jeanette Nolan ... Granny McWhirter
- Bert Remsen ... Isaac Barker
- Charles Gowan ... Alan Hamilton
- Sean Frye ... Resolve Wheeler, as youth
- Tracy Kleronomos ... Dezia Wheeler
- Katy Kurtzman ... Rosa Tench
- Byrne Piven ... Dr. Pearsall
- Julie Gibson ... Lady Peddler

== Production notes ==
=== Location ===
The series was shot in historic New Salem, Illinois. Interiors were filmed in a set constructed in a gymnasium in Springfield, the state capital. The gym was also used to house the prop and wardrobe departments. Filming took 2 1/2 months. As an incentive for the production company to choose the area, the Springfield city council agreed to fill a nearby lake to resemble the Ohio River. The city arranged for animals from the Elgin Zoo to be transported to the set.

=== Coaching of cast ===
The production was faithful to Richter's use of language characteristic of the Ohio Valley in those years. Actress/choreographer Marge Champion instructed the actors in both speech and body language of the region to add to the authenticity of the historical drama.

=== Crew ===
- Directed by: Boris Sagal
- "The Trees" and "The Fields" script: James Lee Barrett
- "The Town" script: Liam O'Brien
- Novels written by: Conrad Richter
- Executive Producer: Harry Bernstein
- Associate Producer: Robin S. Clark
- Executive Producer: Tom Kuhn
- Producer: Robert E. Relyea
- Original Music by: Fred Karlin
- Cinematography by: Michel Hugo
- Film Editing by: Bernard J. Small
- Production Design by: Jack DeShields
- Set Decoration by: Fred Price
- Costume Design by: Frank Tauss
- Key Costumer: Bill Blackburn
- Hair Stylist: Sugar Blymyer
- Assistant Director: Alan R. Green
- First Assistant Director: Dennis E. Jones
- Property Master: Matt Springman
- Sound Mixer: Glenn E. Anderson
- ADR Editor: Jerry Jacobson
- Assistant Cameraman: Jim Mazzula
- Choreographer: Marge Champion
- Dialogue Supervisor: Marge Champion
- Extras Brian Halcomb, Allen Tomlin, Dan Yeager

== Award nominations ==
| Year | Award | Result | Category | Recipient |
|---|---|---|---|---|
| 1978 | Emmy Award | Nominated | Outstanding Single Performance by a Supporting Actress in a Comedy or Drama Series | Jeanette Nolan; For part one |
| 1978 | Emmy Award | Nominated | Outstanding Lead Actress in a Limited Series | Elizabeth Montgomery |
| 1978 | Emmy Award | Nominated | Outstanding Lead Actor in a Limited Series | Hal Holbrook |
| 1978 | Emmy Award | Nominated | Outstanding Individual Achievement in Any Area of Creative Technical Crafts | Sugar Blymyer; For part three |
| 1978 | Emmy Award | Nominated | Outstanding Cinematography in Entertainment Programming for a Series | Michel Hugo |
| 1978 | Emmy Award | Nominated | Outstanding Achievement in Music Composition for a Series (Dramatic Underscore) | Fred Karlin |
