= The Sea of Grass =

1936 novel by Conrad Richter

First edition (publ. Knopf)

The Sea of Grass is a 1936 novel by Conrad Richter. It is set in New Mexico in the late 19th century, and concerns the clash between rich ranchers, whose cattle run freely on government-owned land, a prairie "sea of grass", and the homesteaders or "nesters", who build fences and try to cultivate the soil for subsistence farming. It is an epic portrayal of the end of the cowboy era in the American Southwest on the Great Plains.

Against this background is set the triangle of cattle rancher Jim Brewton, his wife Lutie Cameron from St. Louis, and Brice Chamberlain, an ambitious local federal judge. Richter casts the story in Homeric terms, with the children caught up in the conflicts of their parents. The novel is narrated through the eyes of Hal, Colonel Brewton's nephew.

== Reception ==
Kirkus Reviews praised the author saying that it was a "distinguished piece of work" before continuing to say "[t]here's poetic sweep and rhythm and power in the telling."

== Adaptation ==
The novel was adapted in 1947 as a film of the same name, directed by Elia Kazan and starring Katharine Hepburn and Spencer Tracy. Disappointed with production decisions, such as the use of stock footage of the Plains rather than allowing the film crew to go on location and overly refined costuming for Hepburn, Kazan was displeased with the film. He discouraged others from seeing it. However, it was popular and became the greatest moneymaker of the several Hepburn-Tracy films.
