= Robert Lewis Taylor =

American writer

Robert Lewis Taylor (September 24, 1912 – September 30, 1998) was an American writer who won the 1959 Pulitzer Prize for Fiction for The Travels of Jaimie McPheeters. His writing has been adapted into a television series, film, and musical.

== Education ==
Born in Carbondale, Illinois, Taylor attended Southern Illinois University for one year. The university now houses his papers. He graduated from the University of Illinois at Urbana-Champaign with a Bachelor of Arts degree in 1933.

== Career ==
After college, he became a journalist and won awards for reporting. In 1939, he became a writer for The New Yorker magazine, contributing biographical sketches. His work also appeared in The Saturday Evening Post and Reader's Digest.

From 1942 to 1946, Taylor served in the United States Navy during World War II. During his service, he wrote numerous stories and Adrift in a Boneyard, an extended fiction about survivors of a disaster. In 1949, The Saturday Evening Post commissioned a series of biographical sketches of W. C. Fields. He published them together as W. C. Fields: His Follies and Fortunes. Taylor continued to write fiction and biographies, including one on Winston Churchill.

Taylor's 1958 novel, The Travels of Jaimie McPheeters, about a 14-year-old and his father in the California Gold Rush, won the Pulitzer Prize and was purchased for a film, but eventually became a television series instead. A Journey to Matecumbe was adapted in 1976 as the Disney movie Treasure of Matecumbe. His novel Professor Fodorski served as the basis for the 1962 musical All American.

Taylor died on September 30, 1998.

== Personal life ==
Taylor and his wife lived in Florida.

His daughter is Liz Peek.

== Bibliography ==
=== Books ===
- Adrift in a Boneyard (1948)
- Doctor, Lawyer, Merchant, Chief (1948)
- W. C. Fields: His Follies and Fortunes (1949)
- Professor Fodorski (1950)
- The Running Pianist (1950)
- Winston Churchill: An Informal Study of Greatness (1952)
- The Bright Sands (1954)
- The Travels of Jaimie McPheeters (1958)
- Center Ring (1960)
- A Journey to Matecumbe (1961)
- Two Roads to Guadalupe (1964)
- Vessel of Wrath: The Life and Times of Carry Nation (1966)
- A Roaring in the Wind (1978)
- Niagara (1980)

=== Essays and reporting ===
- Taylor, Robert Lewis (January 3, 1942). "I was once a 97-pound weakling". Profiles. The New Yorker. 17 (47): 21–27. (Note: Profile of Charles Atlas.)

———————

Bibliography notes
