= Unlocking the Air and Other Stories =

1996 short story collection by Ursula K. Le Guin

- First edition
- Author: Ursula K. Le Guin
- Language: English
- Publisher: HarperCollins (hardback)
- Publication date: December 6, 1996
- Publication place: United States
- Media type: book
- Pages: 224 pp
- ISBN: 0-06-092803-4
- OCLC: 33043324

Unlocking the Air and Other Stories is a 1996 collection of short stories by Ursula K. Le Guin. Like Searoad and Orsinian Tales, most of the included stories are neither science fiction nor fantasy. It was a finalist for the 1997 Pulitzer Prize for Fiction.

== Contents ==
- "Half Past Four" (1987, The New Yorker)
- "The Professor's Houses" (1982, The New Yorker)
- "Ruby on the 67"
- "Limberlost" (1989, Michigan Quarterly Review)
- "The Creatures on My Mind" (1990, Harper's)
- "Standing Ground" (1992, Ms.)
- "The Spoons in the Basement" (1982, The New Yorker)
- "Sunday in Summer in Seatown" (1995, Thirteenth Moon)
- "In the Drought" (1993, Xanadu II)
- "Ether, OR" (1995, Asimov's Science Fiction)
- "Unlocking the Air" (1990, Playboy)
- "A Child Bride" (1987, Terry's Universe, as "Kore 87")
- "Climbing to the Moon" (1992, American Short Fiction)
- "Daddy's Big Girl" (1987, Omni)
- "Findings" (1992, Ox Head Press chapbook)
- "Olders" (1995, Omni)
- "The Wise Woman" (1995, The Sound of Writing (broadcast))
- "The Poacher" (1992, Xanadu)
