= Audrey Wurdemann =

American writer

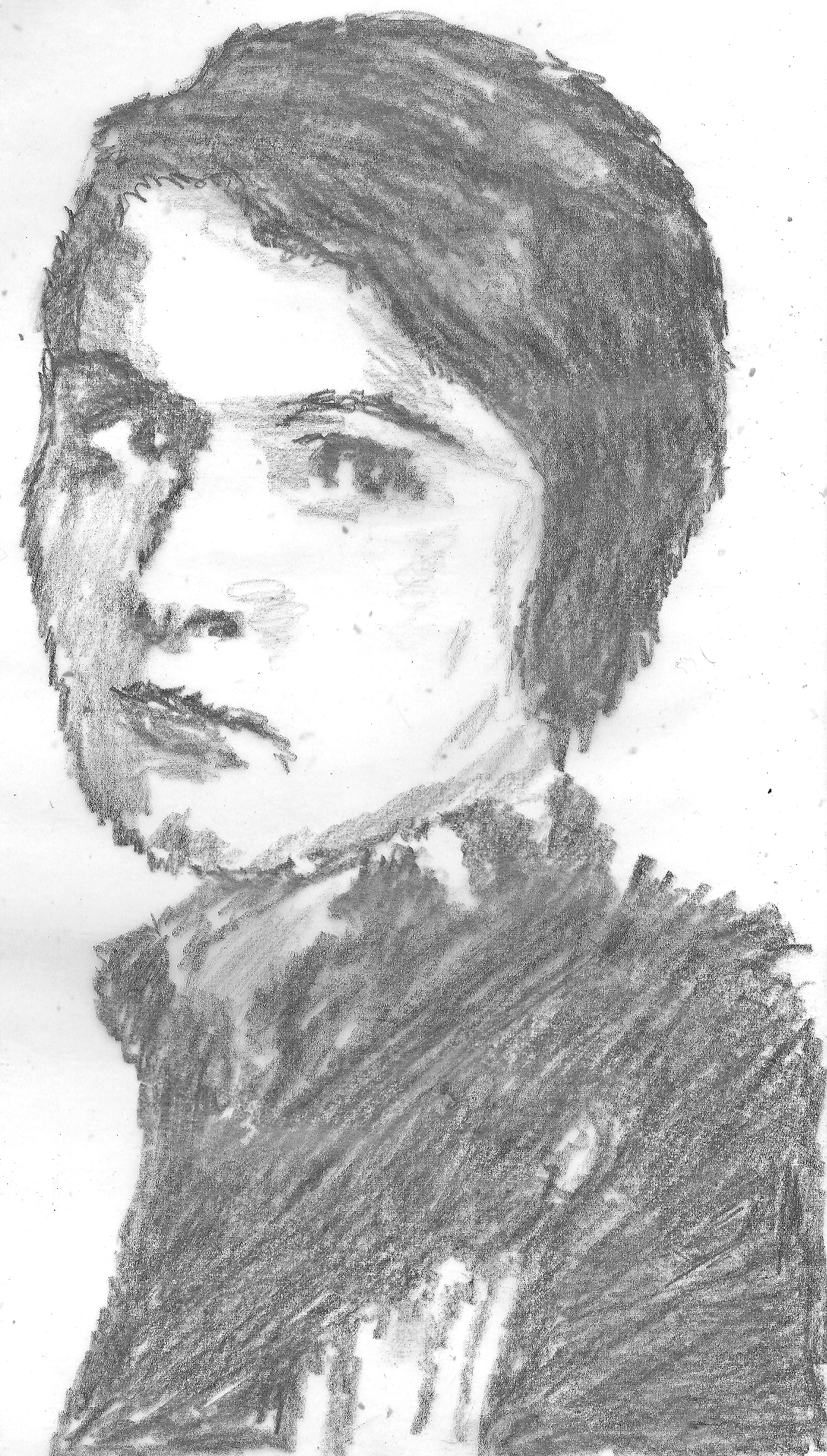
- Pencil sketch of Audrey Wurdemann
- Born: January 1, 1911 Seattle, Washington, U.S.
- Died: May 20, 1960 (aged 49) Miami, Florida, U.S.
- Occupation: Poet
- Education: University of Washington (BA)
- Spouse: Joseph Auslander

Audrey Wurdemann Auslander (January 1, 1911 – May 20, 1960) was an American poet. She was the youngest winner of the Pulitzer Prize for Poetry at the age of 24, for her collection Bright Ambush.

== Biography ==
Wurdemann was born in Seattle, Washington. She claimed to be the great-great-granddaughter of Percy Bysshe Shelley, but no Shelley lineage can be connected to her family. She never attended grammar school, and entered Lakeside High School at the age of 11.

At the age of 15, Wurdemann was introduced to poet and playwright George Sterling by magazine editor Samuel Dickson, who later recalled: "Sterling did not have much patience with adolescent geniuses. But this girl had something. … But that spring morning in 1926 she was very young and very excited." Dickson continued:

Sterling sat in a straight chair, looking out of the window, the physical reincarnation of Dante. His hair was touseled under his tweed cap, his Grecian nose was long and straight, his warm, kind eyes looked through you and past you.

He looked at Audrey and said, "Now, what do you want to do?"

"I want to learn to write great poetry," she said. "Someday I want to be able to describe all nature in my poems--the sky, the earth, the sunrise, and the sunset--everything!"

"Well," Sterling said, "that's very nice. God created the earth and the forests and the trees, and you want to do as fine a thing as God has done. I wish that someday I could write a perfect poem about a single leaf of a tree, with all its wonderful mystery and beauty. But I haven't the courage to undertake the task."

After talking with Wurdemann and reading her first poems, Sterling agreed to help Wurdemann put together a collection of her poetry, and then to find a sponsor who would get her collection of 65 poems published as a book. He also wrote a brief preface. Wurdemann's first book, The House of Silk, was published by Harold Vinal in New York in 1927 when she was 16.

Wurdemann graduated with honors from the University of Washington in 1931. After graduation, she traveled through Asia.

She married poet and novelist Joseph Auslander in 1932 and moved to New York City, where he taught at Columbia. They moved to Washington, D.C., when Auslander was appointed the first Poet Laureate Consultant in poetry of the Library of Congress; they lived at 3117 35th Street Northwest, Washington, D.C., in the Cathedral Heights neighborhood. She subsequently collaborated with him on the novels My Uncle Jan and The Islanders. They spent their last years living in Coral Gables, Florida with their two children, Anna Mary and Louis Joseph Auslander.

Her work appeared in Harper's, and Poetry magazine. Their papers are held at the University of Miami.

== Works ==
=== Poetry ===
- The House of Silk (1927)
- Bright Ambush (1934, winner of the 1935 Pulitzer Prize for Poetry)
- The Seven Sins (1935)
- Splendour in the Grass (1936)
- Testament of Love (1938)

=== Fiction ===
- My Uncle Jan (1945) with Joseph Auslander
- The Islanders (1951) with Joseph Auslander
