= The Trees (Richter novel) =

1940 book by Conrad Richter

- First edition
- Author: Conrad Richter
- Language: English
- Publisher: Alfred A. Knopf
- Publication date: 1940
- Publication place: United States
- English publication date: March 1, 1940
- Media type: Print (hardback & paperback)
- Followed by: The Fields, The Town

The Trees, the first novel of Conrad Richter's trilogy The Awakening Land, is set in the wilderness of central Ohio (c. 1795). The simple plot — composed of what are essentially episodes in the life of a pioneer family before the virgin hardwood forest was cut down — is told in a third-person narration rich with folklore and suggestive of early backwoods speech. The central character is Sayward Luckett, the eldest daughter in a family who the narrator says "followed the woods as some families follow the sea." The book was published by Alfred A. Knopf in 1940. The Trees was followed by The Fields (1946) and The Town (1950). A single-volume trilogy was published in 1966.

== Plot summary ==
Worth Luckett is a "woodsy" who provides for his family by hunting wild animals for food and trading their pelts for other commodities they need. When Worth notices that the wild game is leaving the woods near their settlement in Pennsylvania, he convinces his wife and family to move to where the animal population is more plentiful. They migrate into the Ohio Valley, in the fictional county of Shawanee, where they construct a log cabin. They are soon joined by other settlers, who form the beginnings of a community.

The Lucketts suffer painful losses and hardships during their first few years in the Ohio Valley. Worth's wife, Jary, who was suffering from consumption during the journey, soon dies. The family survives disease, possibly typhoid fever. The youngest child, Sulie, becomes lost in the deep woods; unable to find her, the family gives her up as either dead or taken captive by the Lenape Indians. A grief-stricken Worth abandons his other children to search for her. The second daughter, Genny, marries a neighboring settler. Her husband later runs off with her younger sister, Achsa, causing Genny to suffer a temporary nervous breakdown.

Throughout all of this, the oldest daughter, Sayward, holds the remaining family together. She assumes all responsibility for her younger siblings. Sayward marries a settler named Portius Wheeler, a lawyer known as "The Solitary." He has migrated from Massachusetts, for unstated reasons. The marriage of Sayward and Portius ultimately appears to be successful. At the book's conclusion, the couple has begun to clear the land of trees surrounding the cabin, in order to plant crops. Portius has come out of his shell and begun practicing law again; and Sayward is expecting their first child.

== Writing style ==
Richter conducted extensive research both for historical details and to convey the mode of speech of the early 19th-century pioneers of the Ohio Valley, many of whom originally emigrated from Pennsylvania and the Upper South. (For example, they referred to "trees" as "butts.") In order to write an authentic dialect to express this, Richter used rare collections of old manuscripts, letters, and records that documented the speech of early 18th- and 19th-century residents. His sources included Historical Collections of Ohio by Henry Howe and Pioneer Pennsylvania, a compilation of archaic Pennsylvanian slang by Henry W. Shoemaker. In addition, he interviewed scholars and former neighbors of pioneer heritage whom he had known in his home state of Pennsylvania and in the Ohio Valley.

Richter wrote that this early form of spoken language no longer survived in the Ohio Valley. He learned that it was found in some areas of the South and Southwestern parts of the country. He noted that, although it is often mistaken for a "native" form of speech there, it should be considered "a living reminder of the great mother tongue of early America."

== Major themes ==
=== Man vs. Nature ===
The characters in The Awakening Land deal with the human condition in a setting of great natural challenges as they carve out lives on the frontier. There was a high mortality rate due to disease, warfare, natural disasters, severe weather, and accidents, as well as dangerous animals. They worked to cut down trees and clear the land, to cultivate crops, to care for livestock, and to raise and process all their food. They also had to deal with hostilities from native Indians resisting European-American encroachment. At times they face famine, and natural disasters such as floods.

=== Family ===
Sayward values family above all else. She expresses a strong loyalty to the ties of kinship, even if this loyalty is not always returned. Several members of her birth family, such as her father Worth, her brother Wyitt, and her sister Ascha eventually abandon or otherwise leave the family home, with no attempt to maintain communication. Her younger sister, Sulie, is lost to the forest, and eventually becomes assimilated into the Lenape Indian tribe. But Sayward always remembers these absent family members and holds them in her thoughts. When Sayward has problems in her marriage or with her own children, whether due to her husband's infidelity or generational differences, she tries to defuse tensions and ultimately forgives any wrongs committed.

=== "Woodsies" vs. Settlement dwellers ===
Sayward distinguishes between "woodsies" like her father, Worth, and her brother, Wyitt (itinerant hunters who follow wild game wherever it is to be found), and people like her and her mother, who prefer to live in settlements near other people.

"She tried not to read her father's mind too hard, for she would hate to think he had reasons of his own for wanting her married. A year and a half was mighty long time, she knew, for one like Worth to be fixed and settled in one place. … If she had a man, it might change all that. He could go off and forget to come home and they would be all right. Never would they starve or go naked, for their married sister would take them in. He would be free as a bird to wander. He could see those far places they told about where the deer had strange black tails."

"It was good enough, she felt, just to know they had humans closer around them. … They weren't set out any more in these woods only God Almighty knew how far. .… You might say they were living in a settlement now. She wished Jary could have hung on long enough to see it."

She attributes her father's preference for the "woodsy" life to his being part Delaware Indian ("Monsey", also spelled Munsee, in the dialect of this group).

== Editions of the novel ==
The Trees was published as an Armed Services Edition, distributed to U.S. military personnel during WWII. The Ohio University Press released paperback editions of The Awakening Land trilogy in 1991. Chicago Review Press issued reprints of the original Knopf editions in 2017.

== See also ==
- The Awakening Land: The 1978 miniseries based on the trilogy.
