= The Light in the Forest =

1953 novel by Conrad Richter

- First edition
- Author: Conrad Richter
- Language: English
- Genre: Coming of age
- Publisher: Alfred A. Knopf
- Publication date: May 15, 1953
- Publication place: United States
- Pages: 179
- OCLC: 56570540

The Light in the Forest is a novel first published in 1953 by U.S. author Conrad Richter. Though it is a work of fiction and primarily features fictional characters, the novel incorporates historic figures and is based in historical fact related to the mid-1700s in colonial America.

A 1958 feature film of the same name was adapted from the novel and produced by Walt Disney Productions, starring Fess Parker, Joanne Dru, James MacArthur, and Wendell Corey. The title song was composed by Lawrence Edward Watkin, Paul J. Smith, and Hazel ("Gil") George.

== Synopsis ==
The Light in the Forest is about the struggles of a white boy, John Butler, who was taken captive as a boy in Pennsylvania by the Lenni Lenape Indians and became assimilated.

The story opens in the autumn of 1764. John Butler, approximately fifteen years of age, has lived with the Lenni Lenape in Ohio since being taken captive eleven years earlier. His adoptive Lenape father, Cuyloga, renamed him True Son. He is assimilated and accepted as a full-blooded Lenape by that community. Along with other Native groups, the Lenape enter into a peace treaty with the British forces. The treaty required that the Indians had to return any white captives. True Son did not want to leave as he was fully assimilated and considered himself Lenape; he disdained white society. He tries to commit suicide in order to be free of the whites, but is unsuccessful. Accompanied by a young soldier, Del Hardy, True Son is taken to Fort Pitt, where he is met by Harry Butler, his blood father. Hardy accompanies the Butlers to their home in Paxton Township, near present-day Harrisburg.

After returning to his father's home, True Son refuses to recognize his blood father, continues to wear his Indian clothes, and pretends that he no longer understands English. His younger brother Gordie is intrigued by his Indian ways and True Son becomes fond of him. Later, True Son gets into a heated argument with his Uncle Wilse. Wilse accuses the Indians of scalping children, which True Son denies. Wilse is so angered by what he perceives as the young man's lack of respect that he slaps True Son.

That spring True Son develops an unidentified illness. His physical sickness is compounded by disappointment that none of his Lenape family has tried to contact him since he was forced to go to the Butlers. He is enheartened by learning that two Indians were asking about him at Wilse's shop. That evening he slips out of the Butlers’ house and discovers his Lenape cousin, Half Arrow, nearby. Their reunion is tempered by learning that men from Wilse's shop shot and scalped their friend, Little Crane.

The boys confront Wilse, knocking him to the ground and scalping him. They escape the town into the forest and head west to return to the Lenape. Their people are angry over the murder of Little Crane, and eventually, the tribe declares war on the whites. They attack some small villages and scalp the settlers. True Son sees some children's scalps among the rest and is disturbed to learn that the Indians killed children as well as adults.

True Son is used as bait to lure a band of settlers into an ambush, but he gives away the plan when he sees a child among them who reminds him of Gordie. The Lenape are enraged and plan to burn True Son at the stake in ritual torture. His adoptive father Cuyloga convinces the other band members to banish his son. Cuyloga tells True Son that he is no longer Indian, that he would be considered as a white enemy if ever seen again in Indian territory, and that he (Cuyloga) is no longer True Son's father. Cuyloga accompanies True Son to a white road, where they part.

== Main characters ==
=== True Son ===
True Son (John Cameron Butler) is the story's protagonist. He was kidnapped by the Lenape from his family's home in Pennsylvania. Adopted by a Lenape family, he became assimilated into their culture, undergoing years of traditional lessons of strength and patience, with fire and freezing water tactics, until he was fifteen. At that age, he was forced by a treaty between the Lenape and Great Britain to go back to his birth family.

=== Cuyloga ===
Cuyloga is True Son's adoptive Indian father and believed that the boy had become culturally Lenape. His wife adopted the boy, who was then considered to be a member of her clan, as the Lenape had a matrilineal kinship system. Cuyloga is described as the wisest and the strongest father. He is the one who took the boy as captive in the raid.

=== Del Hardy ===
Del Hardy is a young colonial soldier who is to ensure True Son returns to his birth family. He is also an interpreter who speaks Lenape. Like True Son, Del spent part of his youth living among the Lenape. While he is distrustful of Indians as a group, he is empathetic toward True Son. He allows his Lenape companions to accompany the youth on part of the journey to his white family.

=== Half Arrow ===
Half Arrow is True Son's favorite Lenape cousin. He accompanies him to Fort Pitt. He later travels to Paxton in search of True Son. Together they return to the Lenape village in Ohio.

=== Uncle Wilse ===
Uncle Wilse (Wilson Owens) is True Son's maternal White uncle. He is well known as a member of the Paxton Boys, a group notorious for having massacred a band of friendly Susquehannock Indians, also known as Conestoga or Conestogo, during frontier conflicts after settlers had been attacked by other Indians. True Son hates Wilse for having taken part in the massacre. Wilse believes that True Son has been brainwashed by the Lenape and can no longer be trusted as a white man.

== Historical context ==
While The Light in the Forest is historical fiction, it is based on several historical persons, places, situations and events. The Tuscarawas River, where True Son's Lenape village was located, runs through northeastern Ohio. It meets the Walhonding River to form the Muskingum River near Coshocton. (“The Forks of the Muskingum” are mentioned frequently in the novel.) The Muskingum in turn meets the Ohio River near Marietta, Ohio. Fort Pitt, later developed as Pittsburgh, stood at the confluence of the Allegheny and Monongahela rivers. A British post, it replaced the French Fort Duquesne in 1758 during the French and Indian War, which the British won in 1763.

Harris’ Ferry was located in the area where True Son and his party crossed the Susquehanna. The city of Harrisburg developed at this site. Fort Hunter is now operated as a period museum north of the city. At one point, a Black slave tells True Son and Gordie about Kittatinny, Second, and Stony (or Short) mountains. These are modelled after Blue, Second and Third mountains north of present-day Harrisburg. The narrative provides an accurate description of the craggy crest of Third Mountain.

The Lenape place name, Peshtank or Paxton, is referred to in Dauphin County's Upper, Middle, and Lower Paxton townships, as well as the borough of Paxtang. However, the “Paxton Township” referred to in the novel once included all but the southernmost portion of present-day Dauphin County, as well as part of present-day Lebanon County. When the narrative refers to “the two townships,” the second is likely meant to be Derry, south of Paxton.

John Elder (1706–1792), known as "the Fighting Parson," became the pastor of Paxton Presbyterian Church, located in present-day Paxtang, in 1738. The church was founded in 1732. The present structure, built in 1740, is the oldest Presbyterian church still in use in Pennsylvania. It had been built by the time of the events portrayed in The Light in the Forest. Elder's Protestant Scots-Irish family was from County Antrim, Ireland, and he was a graduate of the University of Edinburgh, Scotland. John followed his father Robert to North America in about 1735. The novel mentions Elder as being pastor of the “Derry Church.” While the unincorporated town of Hershey, in Derry Township, was previously known as Derry Church, Elder's pastorate at the church in Paxtang is unquestioned.

Elder was also a leader of the Paxton Boys, a vigilante frontier group formed to protect White settlers from Indian attack. The Paxton Boys are perhaps best known for having massacred a group of Conestoga Indians who had been placed in protective custody in a jail in Lancaster. The massacre was carried out as vengeance for an attack on White settlers by an entirely different group of Indians.

Henry Bouquet (1719–1765) was a prominent British Army officer in the French and Indian War and Pontiac's War. In autumn 1764, following the French and Indian War, he became commander of Fort Pitt. In October of that year, his army reached the Tuscarawas, the site of True Son's fictional village. Representatives of several Native groups came to him to sue for peace. The return of White captives described in The Light in the Forest was a traumatic experience for many, especially for those who had been adopted and assimilated when young. They knew no other families and way of life other than those of the Lenape. Many such former captives eventually returned to their Indian families, and many others were never exchanged at all. However, Bouquet returned approximately 200 former captives to European-American settlements in the East. Bouquet died suddenly, shortly after the events depicted in the novel.
