= Now in November =

1934 novel by Josephine Johnson

- First edition
- Author: Josephine Johnson
- Language: English
- Publisher: Simon & Schuster
- Publication date: 1934
- Publication place: United States
- Media type: Print (Hardcover)
- Pages: 231 pp. (1st edition hardcover)

Now in November is a 1934 novel by Josephine Johnson. It received the Pulitzer Prize for the Novel in 1935.
