= The Amazing Vacation =

Children's fantasy novel

- First edition (publ. Harcourt Brace)
- Author: Dan Wickenden
- Illustrator: Erik Blegvad
- Publication date: January 1, 1956

The Amazing Vacation is a children's fantasy novel written in 1956 by Dan Wickenden, illustrated by Erik Blegvad. It is very rare, with fewer than 50 copies available in libraries. It is fondly remembered by children of the era, and has been cited by authors as one of the formative books of their childhood.

== Plot summary ==
The plot follows the adventures of Ricky and Joanna, a brother and sister, on vacation from their home in New York City. They have gone to stay with their Uncle Hubert, Aunt Cordelia, and Cousin Emmeline in the rural town of Trimble Valley, while their parents are traveling "on business" in Paris. They are met at the train station by the housekeeper, maid, cook, and witch named Mrs Breadloaf. The children are driven to an old Victorian house where the family lives.

Uncle Hubert is described as a not very good magician, Aunt Cordelia is a gardener, and Cousin Emmeline is "not all here". The children explore the house and find a magical window in the study. The window has a stained glass border and shows scenes from another world: "The Country Without A Name". It appears that some members of the family have traveled to that country, and have lost parts of themselves there, accounting for their strange behavior. Emmeline has lost a turquoise stone from a necklace, which explains why she is "not all here".

With the help of Mrs. Breadloaf, the children open the window and go to the country. Ricky takes his scout knife, and Joanna her knitting bag, which they are told not to give away. They soon meet "a fretful porpentine" who is Mrs. Breadloaf's familiar and who eventually becomes Joanna's faithful servant. Against warnings, the children separate, with Joanna going to the isthmus of Bab'-au-Rhum with Queen Matildagarde VII, and Ricky going to the mountains on the advice of Federico the Porpentine, who goes off to find Joanna.

Joanna spends time on the island with the companions of the Queen: Tansy, Pansy, and Goldenrod. She avoids several attempts by the Queen to steal her knitting bag. Finally she escapes and meets Ali the Boa Constrictor who guides her to the neighboring island Baba. On the way she meets the magician Gordon Johnson.

Meanwhile, Ricky has met the Indian Chief Matinkatunk, his own faithful servant and guide in the Country Without a Name. They travel together until their horses, and Ricky's knife, are stolen by Tim Tumbleweed, who is really Yarrow, the king's treacherous stepson, in disguise. Ricky and the Chief are taken prisoner by King Willexander's henchmen and he is imprisoned in the Castle of the Upper Lowlands. Ricky is finally released when he agrees to accept a false knife from Yarrow. Joanna has been brought to the Castle, after leaving the island of Baba and rescuing Federico from the Island Rhum. Joanna gives away a sweater she knitted, but not the knitting bag, to Princess Citronella in exchange for a turquoise which she thinks is the one lost by her cousin.

Joanna and Ricky finally get to Triple Peak, the home of the Magicians Congress, and a ghost town. They are reunited with Mrs Breadloaf, and travel to the battlefield of the impending war between the King and Queen. Both children parachute from a Dragon Jet and rescue friends and recover lost objects. The War is settled with the help of the Old Magician and the President, and Ali is transformed from a snake back into Prince Culebra, the princess's lost love.

In the final scenes, Joanna and Ricky return to the magic window and climb back into their Uncle's house where they are reunited with all their relatives, and their parents.
