= Dan Wickenden =

American author (1913–1989)

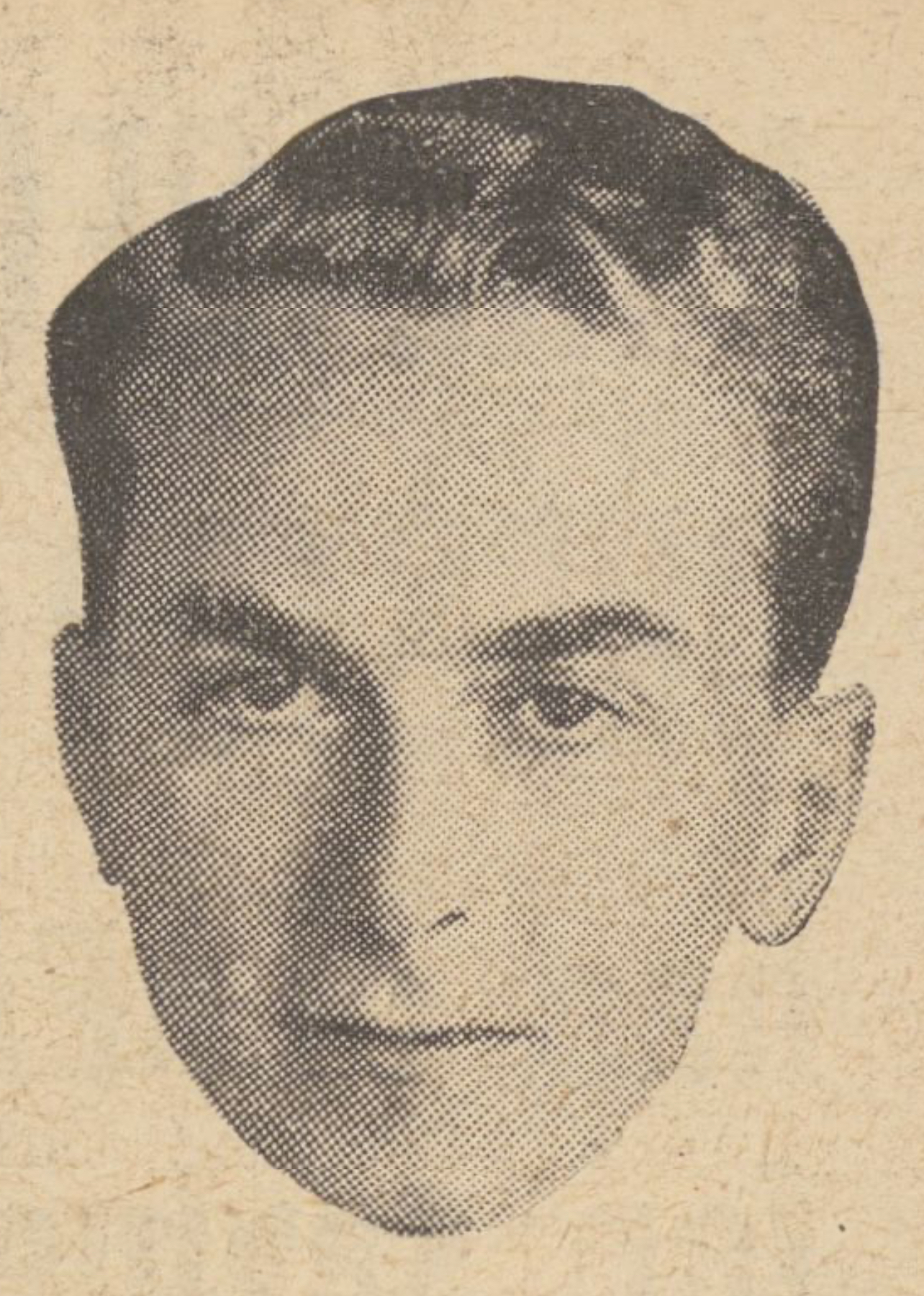
- Daily Mirror, 1938
- Born: Leonard Daniel Wickenden; March 24, 1913; Tyrone, Pennsylvania
- Died: October 27, 1989 (aged 76); Weston, Connecticut
- Education: Amherst College (BA)
- Occupations: Novelist, editor
- Spouse: Hermione Hillman
- Writing career
- Period: 1921-1956
- Genres: Family life, short stories, fantasy
- Notable works: The Wayfarers, Tobias Brandywine, The Amazing Vacation

Leonard Daniel Wickenden (March 24, 1913 – October 27, 1989) was an American author and editor. Notable works include The Running of the Deer, The Wayfarers and The Amazing Vacation.

== Biography ==
Wickenden was born by English-born parents in Tyrone, Pennsylvania and grew up in Long Island. He graduated from Amherst College in 1935. At the early stages of his career, he published short stories on Vanity Fair and The New Yorker.

His first significant contribution as a novelist was The Running of the Deer, a best-selling book about two families from Long Island. He revisited the theme of family life for his next novel, Walk Like a Mortal. He spent a 10-month period in Panajachel, Guatemala, living in a village next to Lake Atitlán with other artists. He returned to the United States in May 1948.

In 1953 he became associate editor at book publisher Harcourt Brace. He eventually became senior editor, and he worked with notable authors that included Eudora Welty, James Gould Cozzens, and Wendell Berry. He retired in 1978, but he continued work in consulting and editing as a freelancer. He died of heart attack at his residence in Weston, Connecticut on October 27, 1989.

== Works ==
- The Running of the Deer (1937)
- Walk Like a Mortal (1940)
- The Wayfarers (1945)
- Tobias Brandywine (1948)
- The Dry Season (1950 )
- The Red Carpet (1952)
- The Amazing Vacation (1956)
