= Bright Ambush =

Book by Audrey Wurdemann

- Title page for Bright Ambush (1934)
- Author: Audrey Wurdemann
- Language: English
- Genre: Poetry
- Publisher: John Day Company, New York
- Publication date: 1934
- Publication place: US
- Media type: Print (Hardback)
- OCLC: 1205509

Bright Ambush is a book of poems written by Audrey Wurdemann in 1934. In May 1935 Wurdemann won the Pulitzer Prize for Poetry for the book. She was the youngest person to win the prize for poetry.
