= Josephine Johnson =

American poet (1910–1990)

- Born: Josephine Winslow Johnson; June 20, 1910; Kirkwood, Missouri, US
- Died: February 27, 1990 (aged 79); Batavia, Ohio, US
- Education: Washington University
- Occupation: Writer
- Writing career
- Genres: Novels, short stories, poetry
- Subject: Nature
- Notable awards: Pulitzer Prize for Fiction, 1935; O. Henry Award, 1934, 1935, 1942, 1943, 1944

Josephine Winslow Johnson (June 20, 1910 – February 27, 1990) was an American novelist, poet, and essayist. She won the Pulitzer Prize for Fiction in 1935 at age 24 for her first novel, Now in November. She is the youngest person to win the Pulitzer for Fiction. Shortly thereafter, she published Winter Orchard, a collection of short stories that had previously appeared in The Atlantic Monthly, Vanity Fair, The St. Louis Review, and Hound & Horn. Of these stories, "Dark" won an O. Henry Award in 1934, and "John the Six" won an O. Henry Award third prize the following year. Johnson continued writing short stories and won three more O. Henry Awards: for "Alexander to the Park" (1942), "The Glass Pigeon" (1943), and "Night Flight" (1944).

== Biography ==
Johnson was born June 20, 1910, in Kirkwood, Missouri. She attended Washington University in St. Louis from 1926 to 1931, but did not earn a degree. She wrote her first novel, Now In November, while living in her mother's attic in Webster Groves, Missouri. She remained on her farm in Webster Groves and completed Winter Orchard in 1935. She published four more books before marrying Grant G. Cannon, editor in chief of the Farm Quarterly, in 1942. The couple moved to Iowa City, where she taught at the University of Iowa for the next three years. They moved to Hamilton County, Ohio in 1947, where she published Wildwood.

Johnson had three children: Terence, Ann, and Carol. The Cannons continued to move beyond the advancing urban sprawl of Cincinnati, finally settling on the wooded acreage in Clermont County, Ohio, which is the setting of The Inland Island. In 1955, Washington University awarded her an honorary Doctor of Humane Letters degree. She published four more books before her death, from pneumonia, on February 27, 1990, in Batavia, Ohio, at age 79.

== Works ==
- Now in November (novel, 1934), for which she was awarded the Pulitzer Prize
- Winter Orchard and Other Stories (short stories, 1936)
- Jordanstown (novel, 1937)
- Year's End (poetry, 1939)
- Paulina Pot (children's book, 1939)
- Wildwood (novel, 1947)
- The Dark Traveler (novel, 1963)
- The Sorcerer's Son and Other Stories (short stories, 1965)
- The Inland Island (essays, 1969), with illustrations by Mel Klapholz (republished in 1996 with illustrations by Annie Cannon, the author's daughter)
- Seven Houses: A Memoir of Time and Places (memoir, 1973)
- The Circle of Seasons with Dennis Stock (1974)
