= Hollis Summers =

American writer (1916–1987)

- Born: June 21, 1916; Eminence, Kentucky
- Died: November 14, 1987 (aged 71); Athens, Ohio
- Occupations: novelist, poet, short story writer and editor

Hollis S. Summers Jr. (June 21, 1916 – November 14, 1987) was an American poet, novelist, short story writer and editor.

== Background and education ==
Born on June 21, 1916, in Eminence, Kentucky, Summers earned an A.B in English from Georgetown College in 1937, an M.A. from Middlebury College in 1943 and a Ph.D. from the University of Iowa in 1949.

== Academic career ==
Summers worked in a variety of educational settings. From 1937 to 1944, he taught as an English teacher at Holmes High School in Covington, Kentucky. From 1944 to 1949, Summers worked at Georgetown College. And from 1949 to 1959, he served as Professor of English at the University of Kentucky. Summers spent the majority of his academic career at Ohio University where he worked from 1959 until his retirement.

== Bibliography ==
=== Novels ===
- City Limit (Houghton Mifflin, 1948)
- Brighten the Corner (Doubleday, 1952)
- The Case of the Bludgeoned Teacher (Avon, 1955) with James F. Rourke, as Jim Hollis
- Teach You a Lesson (Harper, 1955) with James F. Rourke, as Jim Hollis
- The Weather of February (Harper, 1957)
- The Day After Sunday (Harper, 1968)
- The Garden (Harper, 1972)

=== Stories ===
- How They Chose the Dead (Louisiana State University Press, 1973)
- Standing Room: Stories (Louisiana State University Press, 1984)

=== Poetry ===
- The Walks Near Athens (Harper, 1959)
- Someone Else: Sixteen Poems About Other Children (Lippincott, 1962)
- Seven Occasions (Rutgers University Press, 1964)
- The Peddler and Other Domestic Matters (Rutgers University Press, 1967)
- Sit Opposite Each Other (Rutgers University Press, 1970)
- Start from Home (Rutgers University Press, 1972)
- Occupant Please Forward (Rutgers University Press, 1976)
- After the Twelve Days (Ashland Poetry Press, 1987)
- Other Concerns and Brother Clark (Ohio University Press, 1988)

=== Other books ===
- Discussions of the Short Story (Heath, 1963), editor
- Kentucky Story: A Collection of Short Stories (University of Kentucky Press, 1954), editor
- Literature: An Introduction (McGraw-Hill, 1960), co-editor

=== Periodical publications ===
Poetry

- "The Flicker." Beloit Poetry Journal, 5 (Spring 1955): 117.
- "Committee Meeting," Sewanee Review, 64 (Autumn 1956): 606.
- "Mexico Picnic, October 31," Saturday Review, 40 (12 January 1957): 54.
- "Lexington, Kentucky," American Weave, 100 (Spring 1961): 4–6.
- "Seven Occasions for Song," Hudson Review, 15 (Spring 1962): 86–87.
- "Title: To Be Supplied," Western Humanities Review, 17 (Winter 1963): 64.
- "Waiting Bench with Figure," Midwest Quarterly, 7 (Autumn 1964): 96.
- "The Gift," New Mexico Quarterly, 25 (Summer 1965): 137.
- "Snapshots of the Four Grandchildren," Atlantic, 217 (May 1966): 113.
- "Mercy," English Record, 19 (February 1969): 28.
- "Grace Before Calling the Nursing Home and the Jail," Southern Poetry Review, 16 (1977): 83.

Fiction

- "Mister Joseph Potts," Paris Review, 8 (Spring 1955): 107–121.
- "The Prayer Meeting," Sewanee Review, 64 (Winter 1956): 110–122.
- "Cafe Nore," Epoch, 8 (Fall 1957): 153–166.
- "If You Don't Go Out the Way You Came In," Colorado Quarterly, 9 (Summer 1960): 69–83.
- "The Third Ocean," Hudson Review, 22 (Summer 1969): 232–252.

Nonfiction

- "Rejections and Acceptances from Editors and Other Readers: Jesse Stuart's 'Dawn of a Remembered Spring' Remembered". Focus: Teaching English Language Arts. 3: 1–5. Spring 1977.
