= Ohio University Press =

Publisher associated with Ohio University

- Parent company: Ohio University
- Founded: 1947
- Country of origin: United States
- Headquarters location: Athens, Ohio
- Distribution: Chicago Distribution Center (US); Combined Academic Publishers (EMEA, Asia, the Pacific); Scholarly Book Services (Canada)
- Publication types: Books
- Imprints: Swallow Press
- Official website: www.ohioswallow.com

Ohio University Press (OUP) is a university press associated with Ohio University. Founded in 1947, it is the oldest and largest scholarly press in the state of Ohio. Ohio University Press is also a member of the Association of University Presses, and many of its publications are available via the OHIO Open Library.

== History ==
Ohio University Press was incorporated in 1947 and formally established in 1964. Currently, the press publishes approximately 25-30 books annually, and it is currently a "leading publisher of books about Africa, Appalachia, Southeast Asia, and the Midwest". Notable Ohio University Press titles include Robert Gipe's trilogy Trampoline, Weedeater, and Pop.

In 1979, Ohio University Press entered into a licensing agreement with Swallow Press, eventually acquiring the imprint and its back catalog of 276 titles in 2008.

Currently, Ohio University Press awards the Hollis Summers Poetry Prize to select collections of poetry. The award is named after the former Ohio University faculty member and poet.

== Imprints ==
- Swallow Press

== See also ==
- List of English-language book publishing companies
- List of university presses
