= Hodge-podge =

Hodgepodge or hotchpotch describes a confused and/or disorderly mass and/or collection of things; a "mess" or a "jumble".

Hodge-podge may refer to:

- Hodge-Podge (comics), a character from the comic strip Bloom County
- Hodge-Podge (soup), a type of mutton soup
- "Hodge Podge", a Series H episode of the television series QI (2010)

== See also ==
- Hotchpot or hotchpotch, in property law, the blending or combining of property in order to ensure equality of division
- Hodgepodge Lodge, 1970–1977 American children's television series shown on a number of PBS stations
- Hotch Potch House, a BBC television programme aimed at preschool children.
- Hutspot, a simple traditional Dutch casserole, usually composed of potatoes, carrots, and onions, all mashed together.
- Hochepot, an unmashed stew in north-east France and Belgium.
- CBC Kids, a programming block on CBC Television called Hodge Podge Lodge from the 1980s to the early 1990s
- Sacred Chao, a symbol used by Discordians to illustrate the interrelatedness of order and disorder
- Lancashire hotpot, a dish of lamb, potatoes and onions.
- Gallimaufry (book), a book collection of essays by Joseph Epstein
