= By Love Possessed =

By Love Possessed may refer to:

- By Love Possessed (novel), a 1957 novel by James Gould Cozzens
- By Love Possessed (film), a 1961 adaptation of the novel, directed by John Sturges
