= James Gould Cozzens =

American novelist

- Born: August 19, 1903; Chicago, Illinois, U.S.
- Died: August 9, 1978 (aged 74); Stuart, Florida, U.S.
- Education: Harvard University
- Occupation: Writer
- Writing career
- Genre: Realism
- Notable awards: 1949 Pulitzer Prize for Guard of Honor; 1957 Pulitzer Prize nomination for By Love Possessed; 1931 Scribner's Prize for S.S. San Pedro; 1931 O. Henry Award for "A Farewell to Cuba"; 1936 O. Henry Award for "Total Stranger"

James Gould Cozzens (August 19, 1903 – August 9, 1978) was a Pulitzer prize-winning American writer whose work enjoyed an unusual degree of popular success and critical acclaim for more than three decades. His 1949 Pulitzer win was for the World War II race novel Guard of Honor, which more than one critic considered one of the most important accounts of the war. His 1957 Pulitzer nomination was for the best-selling novel By Love Possessed, which was later made into a popular 1961 film.

Culturally conservative critics' widespread acclaim for By Love Possessed, along with a controversial 1957 interview that Cozzens gave to Time, led to an aggressive backlash by author Irving Howe in the New Republic and avant-garde critic Dwight Macdonald in Commentary. Macdonald's essay is still considered "the most persuasively devastating review of the century" more than fifty years later. The criticism, aimed as much at critics catering to a middlebrow- rather than highbrow sensibility as the author himself, did extensive damage to Cozzens' reputation, both during the last 20 years of his life, and posthumously.

In recent years, there have been multiple attempts at resuscitating Cozzens' place in the literary pantheon. D.G. Myers called him "perhaps America's best forgotten novelist." Writer Joseph Epstein has offered similar praise, both in an essay for Commentary magazine, as well as in a chapter for his book Plausible Prejudices. The late biographer and academic editor Matthew J. Bruccoli extended those efforts in a biography and related scholarly work. There has also been recent interest in screenplays based on his work: in 2018, the Hollywood Reporter reported that the rights to Sam Peckinpah's screenplay Castaway, based on Cozzens' novella, had been acquired by a producer.

== Writing ==
Cozzens published his first novel Confusion, in 1924 while still a student at Harvard. A few months later, ill and in debt, he withdrew from school and moved to New Brunswick, where he wrote Michael Scarlett, a second novel. Neither book sold well or was widely read, and to sustain himself, Cozzens traveled to Cuba to teach children of American residents, which is where he began to write short stories and gather material for the novels Cock Pit (1928) and The Son of Perdition (1929).

He met Sylvia Bernice Baumgarten, a literary agent with Brandt & Kirkpatrick, whom he married at city hall in New York City on December 27, 1927, and who successfully edited and marketed his books. Except for military service during World War II, the Cozzenses lived in semi-seclusion near Lambertville, New Jersey, and shied away from all but local contact. Other early novels include S.S. San Pedro (1931) which won the Scribner's Prize, The Last Adam (1933), and Castaway (1934).

During World War II, Cozzens served in the U.S. Army Air Forces, at first updating manuals, then in the USAAF Office of Information Services, a liaison and "information clearinghouse" between the military and the civilian press. One of the functions of his office was in controlling news, and it became Cozzens's job to defuse situations potentially embarrassing to Gen. Henry H. Arnold, the chief of the Army Air Forces. In the course of his job, he became arguably the best informed officer of any rank and service in the U.S., and he had achieved the rank of major by the time he was discharged at the end of the war. These experiences formed the basis of his 1948 novel Guard of Honor, which won the 1949 Pulitzer Prize.

His 1957 novel By Love Possessed became a surprise success, with 34 weeks on the New York Times Best Seller list, rating #1 on September 22, 1957, three weeks after its release. It was also the top-selling novel of 1957. The novel was also very loosely adapted into a movie in 1961. By that time, however, a hostile review of the novel which Dwight Macdonald wrote for Commentary Magazine had already effectively ruined Cozzens's literary career, and few of his later works either received similar critical acclaim or achieved comparable best-seller status. His last novel, Morning, Noon and Night, was published in 1968, but sold poorly.

Throughout his life, Cozzens maintained extensive correspondence, with several literary figures, including American writers Carlos Baker, Saul Bellow, Erskine Caldwell, Granville Hicks, Oliver La Farge, John O'Hara, as well as the publisher William Jovanovich, and academic author-editor and biographer Matthew J. Bruccoli.

== Style and themes ==
Philosophical in nature, his novels take place during the course of just a few days, exhibit little action, and explore a variety of concepts such as love, duty, racial sensitivities, and the law. Cozzens' novels disregarded modernist literary trends, and are characterized by the use of often unfamiliar, archaic words, traditional literary structures, and conservative themes. As a result, many contemporary critics regarded his work as old-fashioned or moralistic, and he was viciously attacked as a reactionary by his harshest critics.

His prose is crafted meticulously and has an objective, clinical tone and subtle, dry humor. His work is at times complex, using multi-level layering and double voicing as narrative techniques for expressing viewpoint. The main characters of his books are primarily professional, middle-class white men — assistant district attorney Abner Coates in The Just and the Unjust, doctor George Bull in The Last Adam, Episcopal priest Ernest Cudlipp in Men and Brethren, Col. Norman Ross in Guard of Honor, and lawyer Arthur Winner in By Love Possessed, for example — who confront issues such as duty and ethics in their careers while attempting to reconcile these principles with the emotional demands of their personal lives, usually by compromising their principles. In almost every instance, they are based on persons he observed in his own experience.

== Controversy ==
Cozzens eschewed both fame and publicity, to the point that he stated publicly he would refuse a Nobel Prize when speculation that he was being considered for one became prominent. During 1957, however, he broke with his long-standing penchant for privacy (for which he was dubbed "the Garbo of U.S. letters" in the article that resulted) and granted Time magazine an interview, over the objections of his wife, as the basis for its cover article of September 2, 1957, marking the release of By Love Possessed.

Short story writer and critic Patrick J. Murphy wrote that Cozzens' responses during the interview were verbalizations of his writing style: often using parody and sarcasm, quoting other works without attribution, and punctuated by laughter. As sometimes happened with his prose, this style did not translate well into print, and the results were further distorted because the information seemed to be gathered by one reporter but the article written by someone different.

An immediate barrage of readers' letters followed and were published, attacking Cozzens as being a snob, an elitist, anti-Catholic, racist and sexist — criticisms that were soon used by critics including Irving Howe, Frederick Crews, and Dwight Macdonald. Cozzens also became a symbol of "The Establishment" and the antithesis of the growing counterculture of the 1960s because his works negatively portrayed or lampooned those against authority and "the system."

Detractors described Cozzens as a hardcore political and religious conservative; in fact, he was largely apolitical and not particularly religious. His attempts to counter this incorrect image met with little success, and he soon forfeited whatever fan base he had gained from By Love Possessed. His reputation was further lambasted during 1968 by critics (in particular John Updike) of his final book, Morning, Noon, and Night, which had a nearly unreadable style (even by the author's usual standards) and a protagonist that was not interesting or compelling.

As a result, sales of all his books suffered, and Cozzens has become virtually unknown to the general public; he remains, however, fairly well known among those familiar with the literary criticism of George Steiner John Derbyshire and Matthew Bruccoli, all of whom have praised his work.

== Legacy ==
Today, Cozzens is often grouped with his contemporaries John O'Hara and John P. Marquand, but his work is generally considered more challenging. His biographer Matthew J. Bruccoli, noted the following qualities in Cozzens' prose style, by describing his language use in the best seller By Love Possessed this way:

... long sentences, frequent use of parenthetical constructions, rhetorical questions, elaborate parallelism, inclusion of unfamiliar words, unacknowledged (classical) quotations, ironically intended word choices, a habit of following a formal statement with a clarifying or deflating colloquialism, polyptoton (repetition of a word in different cases and inflections, as in "result's result"), inverted word order, double negatives, the custom of defining a word or providing alternatives for it, and periodic sentences in which the meaning becomes clear at the end. The effect of these conjoined elements can be a deliberate density of expression ...

Cozzens was a critic of modernism, and of realism more leftist than his own, and he was quoted in a featured article in Time as saying (perhaps somewhat in jest), "I can't read ten pages of Steinbeck without throwing up."

== Works ==
- Confusion (1924)
- Michael Scarlett (1925)
- Cock Pit (1928)
- The Son of Perdition (1929)
- S.S. San Pedro (1931)
- The Last Adam (1933), a.k.a. A Cure of Flesh
- Castaway (1934)
- Men and Brethren (1936)
- Ask Me Tomorrow (1940)
- The Just and the Unjust (1942)
- Guard of Honor (1948)
- By Love Possessed (1957)
- Children and Others (1964), short stories
- Morning, Noon, and Night (1968)

=== Short stories ===
Title	Publication	Collected in
"Remember the Rose"	The Harvard Advocate (June 1923)	-
"Abishag"	Linonia (June 1925)	-
"A Letter to a Friend"	Pictorial Review (May 1926)	-
"Foreign Strand"	Paris Comet (September 1928)	-
"Future Assured"	The Saturday Evening Post (November 2, 1929)	-
"The Defender of Liberties"	Alhambra (January 1930)	-
"Lions Are Lower Today"	The Saturday Evening Post (February 15, 1930)	-
"Someday You'll Be Sorry"	The Saturday Evening Post (June 21, 1930)	-
"October Occupancy"	The American Magazine (October 1930)	-
"We'll Recall It With Affection"	The Saturday Evening Post (October 4, 1930)	Children and Others
"The Guns of the Enemy"	The Saturday Evening Post (November 1, 1930)	Children and Others
"Fortune and Men's Eyes"	Woman's Home Companion (February 1931)	-
"Farewell to Cuba"	Scribner's Magazine (November 1931)	Children and Others
"The Way to Go Home"	The Saturday Evening Post (December 26, 1931)	Children and Others
"Every Day's a Holiday"	Scribner's (December 1933)	Children and Others
"My Love to Marcia"	Collier's (March 3, 1934)	Children and Others
"Love Leaves Town"	The American Magazine (September 1934)	-
"Straight Story"	Collier's (November 17, 1934)	-
"Success Story"	Collier's (April 20, 1935)	-
"Clerical Error" a.k.a. "Foot In It"	Redbook (August 1935)	-
"Total Stranger"	The Saturday Evening Post (February 15, 1936)	Children and Others
"Whose Broad Stripes and Bright Stars"	The Saturday Evening Post (May 23, 1936)	Children and Others
"Something About a Dollar"	The Saturday Evening Post (August 15, 1936)	Children and Others
"The Animals' Fair"	The Saturday Evening Post (January 16, 1937)	Children and Others
"Child's Play"	The Saturday Evening Post (February 13, 1937)	Children and Others
"Men Running"	The Atlantic (July 1937)	Children and Others
"Son and Heir"	The Saturday Evening Post (April 2, 1938)	-
"One Hundred Ladies"	The Saturday Evening Post (July 11, 1964)	Children and Others
"Candida by Bernard Shaw"	The Saturday Evening Post (July 25, 1964)	Children and Others
"King Midas Has Ass's Ears"	Children and Others (1964)	Children and Others
"Eyes to See"	Children and Others (1964)	Children and Others
"A Flower in Her Hair"	A Flower in Her Hair (1974)	-

== Awards and honors ==
- 1960 William Dean Howells Medal for By Love Possessed
- 1958 National Book Award finalist By Love Possessed
- 1957 Pulitzer Prize nomination By Love Possessed
- 1949 Pulitzer Prize for Guard of Honor
- 1931 O. Henry Award for "A Farewell to Cuba"
- 1936 O. Henry Award for "Total Stranger"
- 1931 Scribner's Prize for S.S. San Pedro

== Personal background ==
Born in Chicago, Illinois, Cozzens grew up on Staten Island. His father, Henry William Cozzens Jr., who died when Cozzens was 17, was an affluent businessman and the grandson of William C. Cozzens, a governor of Rhode Island. His mother, Mary Bertha Wood, came from a family of Connecticut Tories who left for Nova Scotia following the American Revolution. Cozzens grew up in the same privileged lifestyle that formed the background of his most acclaimed works.

An Episcopalian, Cozzens attended the Episcopal Kent School in Connecticut from 1916 to 1922, and after graduation attended Harvard University. A few months later, ill and in debt, he withdrew from school and moved to New Brunswick. From there, Cozzens went to Cuba to teach children of American residents, and there began to write short stories and gather material. After a year he accompanied his mother to Europe, where he tutored a young polio patient in order to earn money.

During World War II, Cozzens served in the U.S. Army Air Forces, at first updating manuals, then in the USAAF Office of Information Services, a liaison and "information clearinghouse" between the military and the civilian press. One of the functions of his office was in controlling news, and it became Cozzens's job to defuse situations potentially embarrassing to Gen. Henry H. Arnold, the chief of the Army Air Forces. In the course of his job, he became arguably the best informed officer of any rank and service in the U.S., and he had achieved the rank of major by the time he was discharged at the end of the war.

He met Sylvia Bernice Baumgarten, a literary agent with Brandt & Kirkpatrick, whom he married at city hall in New York City on December 27, 1927, and who successfully edited and marketed his books. She was his apparent antithesis — Jewish and a liberal Democrat — but their marriage lasted successfully until both died in 1978. They had no children. During 1958, they relocated to another country home near Williamstown, Massachusetts. Cozzens was on the Harvard Board of Overseers's Visiting Committee for the English Department from 1960 to 1966. Except for military service during World War II, the Cozzenses lived in semi-seclusion near Lambertville, New Jersey, and shied away from all but local contact.

James and Bernice Cozzens spent their last years in relative obscurity in Martin County, Florida, where they lived in Rio, but used a Stuart post office box as their address. After Bernice's death in January 1978, Cozzens's health deteriorated rapidly. He died on August 9, 1978, of complications from spinal cancer and pneumonia, 10 days short of his 75th birthday.

== Bibliography ==
- Bracher, Frederick. (1959) The Novels of James Gould Cozzens New York: Harcourt Brace. ISBN 978-0837164489
- Bruccoli, Matthew J., ed. (1984) James Gould Cozzens, A Time of War: Air Force Diaries and Pentagon Memos 1943–45 Cambridge: Harvard University. ISBN 978-0897230438
- Bruccoli, Matthew J. (1983) James Gould Cozzens: A Life Apart New York: Harcourt. ISBN 978-0151460489
- Bruccoli, Matthew J. (1981) James Gould Cozzens: A Descriptive Bibliography Pittsburgh: University of Pittsburgh Press. ASIN B008SMLNLW
- Maxwell, D. E. S. (1964) Cozzens (Writers and Critics) Oliver & Boyd. ASIN B0006CQ1NW
- Merriwether, J. B., Bruccoli M. J., and Clark, C.E. Frazer (1972) James Gould Cozzens: A Checklist ASIN B0006C440O
- Rubin, J. (2010). Repossessing The Cozzens–Macdonald Imbroglio: Middlebrow Authorship, Critical Authority, and Autonomous Readers In Postwar America. Modern Intellectual History, 7(3), 553–579. doi:10.1017/S1479244310000235

== Archives ==
James Gould Cozzens Papers, 1878-1978 are archived at Princeton University Library's Special Collections

== Sources ==
- James Gould Cozzens at 'Internet Accuracy Project'
- Bruccoli, Matthew J. (1983) James Gould Cozzens, A Life Apart. Harcourt Brace. ISBN 0151460485.
- "The Hermit of Lambertville". September 2, 1957. TIME.
