= Advancement (inheritance) =

Advancement is a common law doctrine of intestate succession that presumes that gifts given to a person's heir during that person's life are intended as an advance on what that heir would inherit upon the death of the parent. Not to be confused with an advance of someone's expected distribution from an estate currently in probate.

== Example ==
Suppose person P had two children, A and B. Suppose also that P had $100,000, and gave $20,000 to child A before P's death, leaving $80,000 in P's estate. If P died without a will, and A and B were P's only heirs, A and B would be entitled to split P's estate evenly. If the doctrine of advancement were not applied, then each child would receive half of the remaining $80,000, or $40,000. However, if the doctrine of advancement is applied, then the $20,000 already given to A would be considered part of P's estate advanced to A. Thus, the estate would still be valued at $100,000, and each heir would be entitled to $50,000, with the $20,000 already given to A being counted as part of his share. Of the remaining $80,000, A would take $30,000 and B would take $50,000.

== History ==
The principle is of ancient origin; as regards goods and chattels it was part of the ancient customs of London and the province of York, and as regards land descending in coparcenary (under which only one heir can claim an inheritance) it was always part of the common law of England under the name of hotchpot. Land which belongs or would belong to a child as heir need not be brought in to the common fund, even though such land was given during the father's (Note: At the time the common law was established, inheritance was universally considered to be from father to sons) life.

The widow can gain no advantage from any advancement. No child can be forced to account for his or her advancement, but instead he will be excluded from a share in the intestate's estate. The usual judicial view was that any considerable sum of money paid to a child at that child's request is an advancement; thus payment of a son's debts of honour has been held to be an advancement. On the other hand, trivial gifts and presents to a child were undoubtedly not advancements.

== Contemporary law ==
A number of jurisdictions have enacted statutes which ameliorate the doctrine of advancement by requiring, for example, that the person giving the gift must indicate in writing that it is intended to be counted as an advancement against the estate. The Uniform Probate Code, which has been adopted in whole or in part by a number of states, limits the doctrine by requiring a contemporaneous writing from the deceased, or any writing from the property recipient, indicating that the property is intended to be treated as an advance upon the estate.

== See also ==
- Ademption by satisfaction — a similar doctrine applied to lifetime gifts made by decedent with a valid will
