= Ademption by satisfaction =

Ademption by satisfaction, also known as satisfaction of legacies, is a common law doctrine that determines the disposition of property under a will when the testator has made lifetime gifts to beneficiaries named in the will. Under the doctrine, a gift that the maker of the will (the testator) gives during his lifetime to a named beneficiary of the will is treated as an advance payment of that beneficiary's inheritance. If the probate court determines that the testator intended the lifetime gift to satisfy a bequest under the will, the amount of the lifetime gift is deducted from the amount that the beneficiary would have received under the will.

== Application ==
In the United States, state law determines which lifetime gifts are treated as gifts in satisfaction of a bequest. Under the Uniform Probate Code, § 2-609, a lifetime gift is treated as satisfaction of a legacy only if (i) the will provides for deduction of the gift, (ii) the testator indicated in a contemporaneous writing that the lifetime gift was intended to satisfy a legacy in the will, or (iii) the gift recipient acknowledged in writing that the gift was intended to satisfy a legacy in the will. Courts may presume that gifts of money from a parent to a child after the execution of the parent's will are gifts in satisfaction of the child's legacy under the will, even without a written indication of intent to satisfy the provision under the will. Courts are reluctant to apply the doctrine to certain kinds of legacies, for example, devises of specific real estate or bequests of personal property. These specific legacies are viewed by courts as unique and not able to be replaced with a lifetime gift of money or other property.

When the probate court determines that the doctrine applies to a lifetime gift made to a will beneficiary, the amount beneficiary's gift under the will is reduced by the amount the beneficiary has already received. For example, if the will bequeaths $5,000 to a beneficiary, but the beneficiary received a lifetime gift of $4,000 from testator that was intended to partially satisfy the gift under the will, the beneficiary will receive only $1,000 under the will. If the will provides that the beneficiary receives a percentage of the testator's estate, the court may engage in a hotchpot calculation to determine the amount, if any, that the beneficiary should receive under the will. If the value of the lifetime gift received is greater than the beneficiary's calculated share under the will, the beneficiary receives nothing under the will, but does not return any of the lifetime gifts.

== See also ==
- Advancement — a similar doctrine in the context of intestate succession
