= Plausible Prejudices =

Plausible Prejudices: Essays on American Writing
- Author: Joseph Epstein
- Language: English
- Published: 1985
- Publication place: United States

Plausible Prejudices: Essays on American Writing is a 1985 collection of essays by Joseph Epstein dealing with literary criticism and other subjects.

== Reception ==
Kirkus Reviews said that "his collection of prejudices doesn't add up to a coherent position or a serious argument." Richard Eder of The Los Angeles Times wrote that "you wonder at times what he is defending." Chicago Tribune critic Stevenson Swanson said that the book needs more content.
