= The Just and the Unjust =

1942 novel by James Gould Cozzens

- First edition
- Author: James Gould Cozzens
- Language: English
- Publisher: Harcourt, Brace and Company
- Publication date: 1942
- Publication place: United States
- Media type: Print (hardback & paperback)
- LC Class: PS3505.O99
- Preceded by: Ask Me Tomorrow
- Followed by: Guard of Honor

The Just and the Unjust is a novel by James Gould Cozzens published in 1942. Set in "Childerstown," a fictional rural town of 4000 persons, the novel is a courtroom drama of a murder trial that begins June 14, 1939, and takes three days.

Cozzens lived in Lambertville, New Jersey, when he wrote The Just and the Unjust, and researched his subject by spending hours at the Doylestown, Pennsylvania courthouse. His protagonist is an assistant district attorney representing "the Commonwealth" and prosecuting in the "Court of Quarter Sessions," and the town was located on the route of Abraham Lincoln's funeral train, strongly suggesting that his Childerstown is also in Pennsylvania.

== Plot introduction ==
The novel has a prologue of several court docket entries in the case of Commonwealth v. Stanley Howell and Robert Basso. The first entry, dated May 31, 1939, indicates that the three defendants in a case of capital murder—Robert Basso, Stanley Howell, and Roy Leming—have all been declared indigent and had attorneys appointed for them. A second, dated June 12, indicates that the trial of Basso and Howell has been severed from that of Leming, now defended by an attorney of questionable character.

The defendants and their victim are all "foreigners—the people from somewhere else." They have been charged with the cold-blooded murder of a drug dealer and addict, Frederick Zollicoffer, whom they had kidnapped for ransom on April 6, and killed afterwards on or about April 17, possibly at the direction of a fourth criminal who died in a fall trying to escape from police in New York City. The F.B.I. had also entered the case and arrested Howell, from whom they had extracted a confession.

== Characters ==
As in all his "professionals" novels, Cozzens uses a vast cast of characters, many of whom appear frequently without playing important roles in the plot advancement. The central figures, listed below, are excellently drawn from the outset, but minor figures are often used without reference to their previous role, leaving the reader the choice of going far back to try to locate their initial appearance or continuing to read without understanding their purpose in the scene.

=== The trial attorneys ===
- Abner Coates - assistant district attorney. 31 years old, Abner is tall but stooped, a lawyer of 6 years who has tried hundreds of cases but never a murder trial. He is capable but phlegmatic by nature, one of the "Lawyer Coateses" of Childerstown
- Martin Bunting - district attorney, Bunting is head prosecutor, short, neat, prematurely graying in appearance, with a careful, precise and dry demeanor
- Harry Wurts - defense attorney appointed to defend Howell, Abner's close friend when both were law students at Harvard. Fatuous and overbearing, Harry Wurts relishes being a nuisance but too easily takes offense when none is given. He uses ridicule at the expense of counsel and witnesses as a trial tactic when he cannot attack the facts.
- George Henderson Stacey - defense attorney appointed to defend Basso, one of the youngest lawyers in the county, he tries to emulate Harry but shows potential for becoming a mature, stable figure
- Mr. Servedei - defense attorney for Leming, from a big city shyster firm, a little gray man whose only apparent role is as an interested observer

=== Other figures ===
- Judge Thomas Vredenburgh - in his 60s, the presiding judge at the murder trial, dignified without being pompous, sage and protective of his authority in the courtroom, said to be without much "feel" for the law
- Bonnie Drummond - Abner's girlfriend and distant relation, an attractive and tall 25-year-old woman of intelligence and self-assurance. She exhibits a subtle resentment through much of her dialogue with Abner.
- Judge Philander Coates - Abner's father, forced to retire from the bench after a recent stroke, house-bound in a wheelchair and angry at his fate, but always a mentor to his son.
- Jesse Gearhart - the Republican county chairman, another gray little man, with a silent power to control election choices and political ambitions. Abner self-righteously resents the demanding or granting of political favors and openly dislikes him.
- Jake Riordan - the acknowledged "best attorney in town", nonetheless has avoided involvement in the murder trial while picking up the case of the son of wealthy, influential man.

=== Trial witnesses ===
- John Costigan - a county detective, stolid and non-controversial.
- Mrs. Marguerite Zollicoffer - the victim's wife, initially presenting a sympathetic image to the jury but soon unable to control her emotions
- Walter Cohen - the victim's business partner, corpulent, evasive, and self-serving
- Roy Leming - the third defendant, testifying as state's evidence against his partners, 38 years old and afraid of Bunting, but wary and experienced during cross-examination
- P. T. Kinsolving - a Federal Bureau of Investigation agent, a cold and calculating expert in the law and criminals, suspected of using brutality to get a confession
- Stanley Howell - a defendant testifying on his own behalf

== Sub-plots ==
Unlike many courtroom dramas, The Just and the Unjust is selective in its actual presentation of courtroom events. Not all witnesses are presented, and testimony and arguments are incomplete. However Cozzens displays an ear for what is mundane to the reader's interest and what is germane to characterization, if not to plot. He develops two legal subplots of a sex scandal involving a local high school teacher and a vehicular homicide case involving the son of an influential politician, and weaves their storylines into the ongoing trial, allowing Cozzens to cut away from what are often tedious courtroom procedures.

These legal plot lines are supported by personal complications in Abner Coates' life, as he tries to reason out whether or not he wants to run for district attorney (and beholden to Jesse Gearhart), get married, and how to deal with his infirm father.

== Quotes ==
- "'Don't be cynical,' Judge Coates said. 'A cynic is just a man who found out when he was about ten years old that there wasn't any Santa Claus, and he's still upset.'"
- "'I don't know about you, sir,' Abner said, 'But when somebody tells me I am, or was, an ass, I may grant the truth of the matter alleged, but nobody can stop me wanting to interpose a demurrer to the evidence.'"
- "You just had to take a practical view that a man always lied on his own behalf, and paid his lawyer, who was an expert, a professional liar, to show him new and better ways of lying. Abner remembered a passage his father was fond of quoting from a life of Chief Justice Parsons, or someone like that, about the plaintiff who brought an action against a neighbor for borrowing and breaking a cooking pot. Advice of counsel was that the defendant should plead that he never borrowed the pot; and that he used it carefully and returned it whole; also, that the pot was broken and useless when he borrowed it; also, that he borrowed the pot from someone not the plaintiff; also, that the pot in question was defendant's own pot; also that the plaintiff never owned a pot, cooking or other; also that—and so on, and so on."
- "The jurors were plain or homely speakers themselves, indifferent to grammar and disdainful of elegant pronunciations; but that particular accent of Mrs. Zollicoffer's served as a reminder that she, like all the rest of these people, came from the city. With irritation the jury heard the foreigners, the people from somewhere else, having their presumptious say. Justice for all was a principle they understood and believed in; but by "all" they did not perhaps really mean persons low-down and no good. They meant that any accused person should be given a fair, open hearing, so that a man might explain, if he could, the appearances that seemed to be against him. If his reputation and presence were good; he was presumed to be innocent; if they were bad, he was presumed to be guilty. If the law presumed differently, the law presumed alone."
