= 1231 property =

Category of property under U.S. Internal Revenue Code

1231 Property is a category of property defined in section 1231 of the U.S. Internal Revenue Code. 1231 property includes depreciable property and real property (e.g. buildings and equipment) used in a trade or business and held for more than one year. Some types of livestock, coal, timber and domestic iron ore are also included. It does not include: inventory; property held for sale in the ordinary course of business; artistic creations held by their creator; or, government publications.

== History ==
The 1954 version of the Internal Revenue Code included section 1231 covering certain property held by a business. The original section covering this matter - namely, section 117(j) of the Internal Revenue Code of 1939 - was enacted in 1942. The law was originally conceived as a way to help the shipping industry during World War II.

The present version of the Internal Revenue Code has retained section 1231, with the provision now applying to both property lost in an involuntary conversion, and to the sale or exchange of certain kinds of business-use property.

== Application ==
A taxpayer can calculate net 1231 gains and losses, often referred to as the hotchpot, as capital gains, with the caveat that if the gain is less than any “non-recaptured losses” from the preceding five years, it is re-characterized as ordinary income and is reported with Form 4797.

“Non-recaptured loss” is covered by 1231(c). This provision refers to a situation when a taxpayer claims a 1231 loss in year one, but seeks a 1231 gain in any of subsequent years two through six. Any gain which is less than or equal to the loss in year one will be characterized as ordinary income rather than long-term capital gain (which has preferred tax rates).

Gains and losses under 1231 due to casualty or theft are set aside in what is often referred to as the fire-pot (tax). These gains and losses do not enter the hotchpot unless the gains exceed the losses. If the result is a gain, both the gain and loss enter the hotchpot and are calculated with any other 1231 gains and losses. If there are more casualty loss(es) than gains, the excess is treated as an ordinary loss.

== Impact ==
Section 1231 treatment allows taxpayers to enjoy tax-favored treatment for 1231 property gains that are greater than 1231 property losses. This means that if the asset can be sold for a value greater than its basis, it can be taxed at a capital gains rate, which is lower than an ordinary income rate. However, if the 1231 property results in a loss then the taxpayer can treat it as an ordinary loss and such a loss may reduce the taxpayer's taxable income.

This provision is said to give a taxpayer the "best of both worlds" as it allows the favorable capital gains tax rate on section 1231 property while avoiding the negative implications of capital loss treatment. Ordinary losses are 100% deductible, while capital losses are subject to an annual deduction limitation of $3,000 against ordinary income. Within this framework, if capital losses exceed capital gains by more than $3,000 in any given tax year, the portion of the deduction that may be used to offset ordinary income is limited to $3,000; the excess loss over $3,000 must be carried over to the following year.

C Corporations are not allowed to deduct capital losses against ordinary income, and must instead deduct capital losses only against capital gains. If capital losses exceed capital gains in any given tax year, the excess loss may be carried back three years and carried forward five years where it is offset against capital gains of those years. When carrying a C corporation's capital loss back or forward, the loss does not retain its character as short-term or long-term. In other words, the loss is treated as a short-term capital loss even if it was originally a long-term capital loss.

Section 1231 does not reclassify property as a capital asset. Instead, it allows the taxpayer to treat net gains on 1231 property as capital gains, but to treat net losses on such property as ordinary losses.

Congress has decided not to let this "best of both worlds" treatment give taxpayers undesired benefits beyond its purpose. This treatment would compel a taxpayer to sell a Section 1231 loss asset at the end of a year to get an ordinary loss and hold a Section 1231 gain until the next taxable year to receive capital gains treatment. To limit the impact of this undesired result, Congress included 1231(c). This is a controversial topic in U.S. taxation.

Under 1231(c), the 1231 gain that was deferred until the second year in the example above will be recharacterized as ordinary income. This is done because the taxpayer has already received the benefit of having the loss in year one treated as an ordinary loss. Thus, if the 1231 gain is disposed of after year one, but before what becomes the seventh year under 1231(c)(2)(A), it will receive ordinary income treatment. If held onto and disposed of after the seventh year, it may be treated as a capital gain.

== See also ==
- Tax deduction
- Depreciation recapture
