= Guard of Honor =

1948 novel by James Gould Cozzens

- Hardback first edition
- Author: James Gould Cozzens
- Language: English
- Publisher: Harcourt, Brace and Company
- Publication date: 1948
- Publication place: United States
- Media type: Print (hardback & paperback)
- Pages: 631
- Preceded by: The Just and the Unjust
- Followed by: By Love Possessed

Guard of Honor is a Pulitzer Prize-winning novel by American writer James Gould Cozzens published during 1948. The novel is set during World War II, with most of the action occurring on or near a fictional Army Air Forces base in central Florida. The action occurs during a period of approximately 48 hours. The novel is chapterless in form, using three progressively longer parts entitled "Thursday", "Friday" and "Saturday". From dates on various memoranda quoted, the story takes place on September 2, 3, and 4, 1943.

Before entering the USAAF during 1943, Cozzens had already published 10 novels; his duties included writing speeches and articles for Henry H. Arnold, commanding general of the USAAF. Cozzens worked in the USAAF Office of Information Services, a liaison and "information clearinghouse" between the military and the civilian press (like his Guard of Honor character Nathaniel Hicks, Cozzens' first duty was revising field manuals). One of the functions of his office was in controlling news, and it became Cozzens’ job to defuse situations potentially embarrassing to Arnold.

One such incident occurred during April 1945: African-American officers protested the segregation of officer club facilities in what became known as the Freeman Field Mutiny. Cozzens included a fictional but similar incident in Guard of Honor, not as a dramatic recreation of the incident but as backdrop for his analysis of the relationship between fate and the character and personality of leaders. Although several African-American characters appear in Guard of Honor, none are point-of-view figures.

Guard was one of Cozzens' "professional novels", in which he drew detailed portraits of individuals, centering on their professional lives and the details of their work. He expertly recreates the feel of the stateside Army Air Forces, accurately recalls historical facts pertinent to the story line without becoming academic, and references airplanes and technical aspects without excessive explanation and without bogging down the action. All characters in the novel, except Nathaniel Hicks, are named throughout using their rank or title and last name.

== Plot introduction ==
The novel begins with seven characters flying to Ocanara Army Air Base, Florida, after a daylong visit to Sellers Field, Mississippi, aboard an AT-7 navigation trainer. It concerns the activities of a fictional administrative command named Army Air Forces Operations and Requirements Analysis Division, acronymed AFORAD. This organization is a fictional amalgamation of its real-life counterparts, the office of the Assistant Chief of Air Staff for Operations, Commitments, and Requirements (OC&R) and the organizations in Florida that OC&R supervised, the Army Air Forces Tactical Center (AAFTAC), and the Army Air Forces Board.

The beginning segment, the shortest of the novel, introduces the major characters and their traits by examining their reactions to a minor subplot of the handling of the querulous base commander at Sellers Field: an old Regular Army colonel who is an alcoholic. Much of the chapter is spent examining Colonel Ross' thoughts while he perfunctorily reviews his seemingly routine daily paperwork, which he has brought with him on the brief visit.

Two memoranda foreshadow major incidents in the storyline: the arrival of officers of Project 0-336-3, a group of African-American pilots slated to form a bombardment squadron; and an ever-expanding plan by another problem colonel (this one General Beal's own Executive Officer) to hold a surprise birthday parade ceremony for General Beal on Saturday using numerous military aircraft and troops in a flyover.

The opening segment ends when the general's AT-7, in the midst of the harrowingly described turbulence of a nighttime thunderstorm, barely avoids a mid-air collision with a B-26 bomber landing at Ocanara. After an angry exchange with his own co-pilot, in which he impetuously has the co-pilot arrested, General Beal is distracted while mollifying Colonel Ross; his co-pilot confronts the bomber's crew, who are all African-American, and punches the black pilot in the face.

Events quickly begin to happen early the next morning. A local newspaper, using leaks from classified memos, skewers AFORAD both for the coming parade and its many old colonels. Indignation among the newly arrived African-American pilots over the assault and the arbitrary decision of the AFORAD Executive Officer to create a separate officer's club for them results in a protest being organized. General Beal has calmed and wants to ignore his co-pilot's behavior. A black newspaper reporter shows up on base at an inopportune moment. The alcoholic base commander of Sellars Field has committed suicide after General Beal's visit. Two generals are due to arrive in the afternoon from the Pentagon, one bearing a high decoration to be presented to the black pilot for prior heroism, the other investigating the suicide.

Guard of Honor then begins to examine the motivations behind and interlocking effects of these problems (and those of a tragic accident yet to come) on General Beal, Colonel Ross, and Nathaniel Hicks as each tries to juggle his part in them with as little consequence as possible while still "doing the right thing." In 1979 critic Raymond J. Wilson noted similarities between Guard of Honor and Gravity's Rainbow and suggested that Thomas Pynchon had been influenced by Cozzens's novel.

== Characters ==
=== Major characters ===
- Major General Ira "Bus" Beal – Commander of AFORAD, youngest Major General in the USAAF by virtue of heroics in the Philippines and the invasion of North Africa, about to celebrate his forty-first birthday. Although a long-time officer, General Beal is still uncomfortable with high command, prone to act or make decisions on impulse and emotion.
- Colonel Norman Ross – called "Judge" by General Beal, former National Guard officer recalled to active duty, a county judge in civilian life who is General Beal’s Air Inspector. Colonel Ross is sixty and acts as both mentor and sounding board for Beal; much of the book is written from Colonel Ross’s viewpoint.
- Captain Nathaniel Hicks – 38 years old and a wartime volunteer in the Reports Section of AFORAD's Special Projects Directorate. Formerly an editor of a national magazine, Nathaniel Hicks is collecting interview material for a project to revise a manual on fighter tactics.
- Lieutenant Amanda Turck – a Women's Army Corps officer in her late twenties, apparently divorced, intelligent but self-consciously tall and plain. In civilian life a medical librarian who had attempted medical school, Lieutenant Turck now tracks classified documents.

=== Other important figures ===
- Lieutenant Colonel Benny Carricker - an imperious young fighter pilot who served with General Beal overseas, ostensibly the Base Flight Control Officer but actually General Beal's co-pilot and flying companion
- Brigadier General Joseph Josephson Nichols - Deputy Chief of Air Staff, a consummate Pentagon politician known familiarly as "Jo-Jo" by pre-war Regulars. General Nichols' demeanor is dispassionate, almost detached, and loyalties or past accomplishments hold little sway with him in judging performance.
- Captain Donald Andrews - one of Nathaniel Hicks' roommates, Captain Andrews is a goodnatured mathematical genius with an innocent's belief in justice and goodness
- Captain Clarence Duchemin - Nathaniel Hicks' other roommate, a large, garrulous and hedonistic co-worker in Special Projects who considers the war as a basis for having a good time.

=== Catalyst figures ===
- Colonel Mowbray - AFORAD's Executive Officer, known as "Pop", he was one of the original pilots of the air service, taught to fly by Wilbur Wright. Almost sixty and not very bright, and passed over for high command, Colonel Mowbray inadvertently creates one mess after another.
- Lieutenant Jim Edsell - Nathaniel Hicks' other co-worker, a writer and former newspaperman. Lieutenant Edsell is vocally headstrong and socially conscious, but blatantly smug, with a superior opinion of himself and a corresponding contempt of the military (or authority) and anyone voluntarily in it (or who has it). A secretary innocently observes of him, "You're sort of against everything all the time, aren't you?"
- Lieutenant Colonel Howden - Head of counter-Intelligence at AFORAD and Edsell's extreme opposite in every manner. Paranoid, authoritarian, Lieutenant Colonel Howden sees subversion everywhere and uses intimidation and threats indiscriminately.
- Chief Warrant Officer F. X. Botwinick - Colonel Mowbray's assistant, Mr. Botwinick, called "Botty" by his associates, is very military in bearing, a product of the old Army, and seemingly deferential to all rank. He operates a network of "snitches" to gather information for Colonel Mowbray and is not beyond spying on General Beal.
- Mrs. Sal Beal - General Beal's young, beautiful and immature wife, the virtual antithesis of Lieutenant Turck, Mrs. Beal is flighty but enjoys the prestige of her husband.

== Publication ==
Harcourt-Brace published the novel in September 1948. Reviews were quite uniformly positive. For example, Brendan Gill wrote in The New Yorker: "Every page of Guard of Honor gives the impression of a writer at the very top of his powers setting out to accomplish nothing less than his masterwork" and "doing just that." There are at least 10 subsequent editions, some with changes and(generally the removal of certain risqué sentences).
