= Hutspot =

Boiled vegetable dish associated with Dutch cuisine

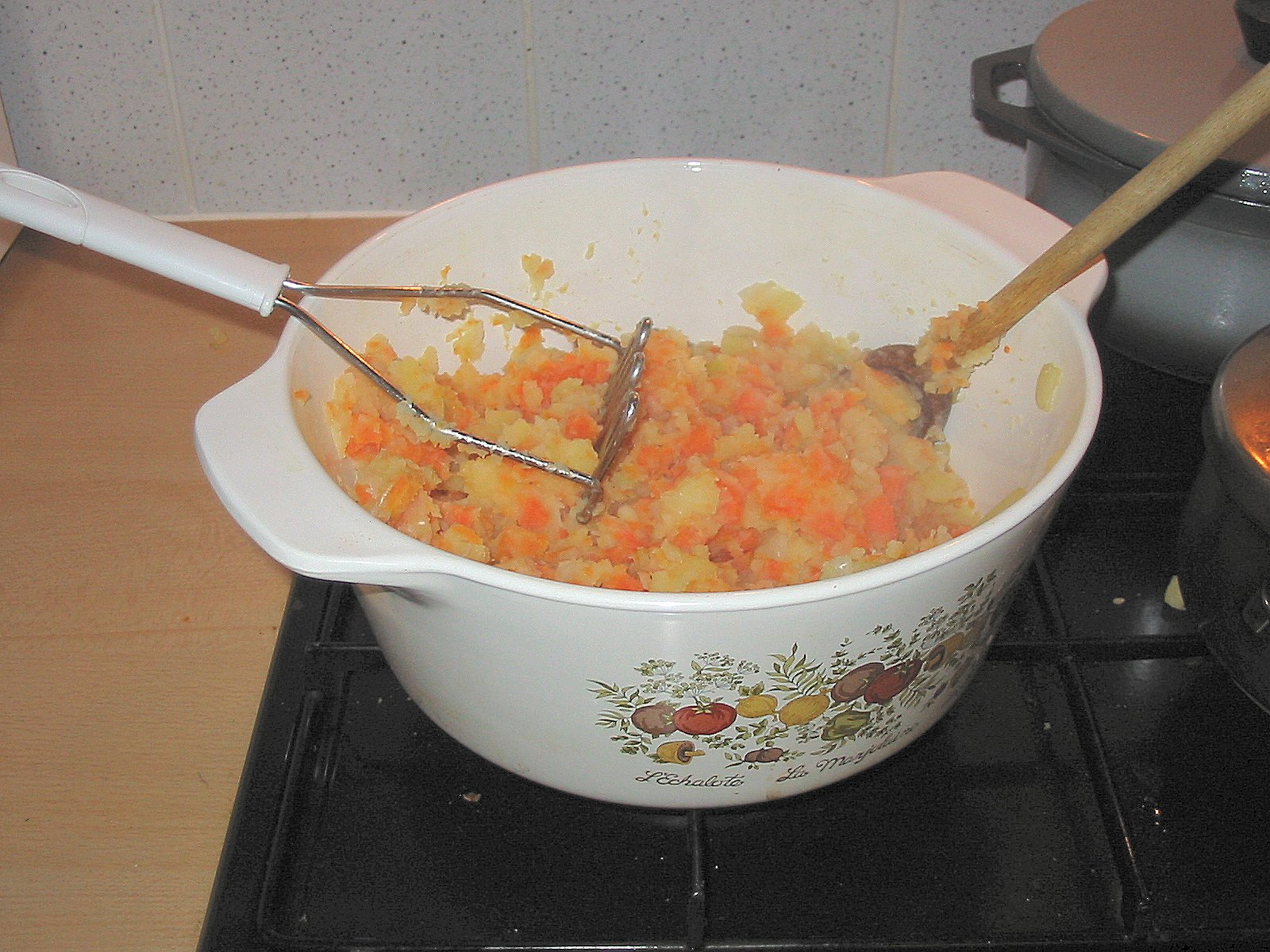
- Place of origin: The Netherlands
- Main ingredients: Potatoes, carrots, onions

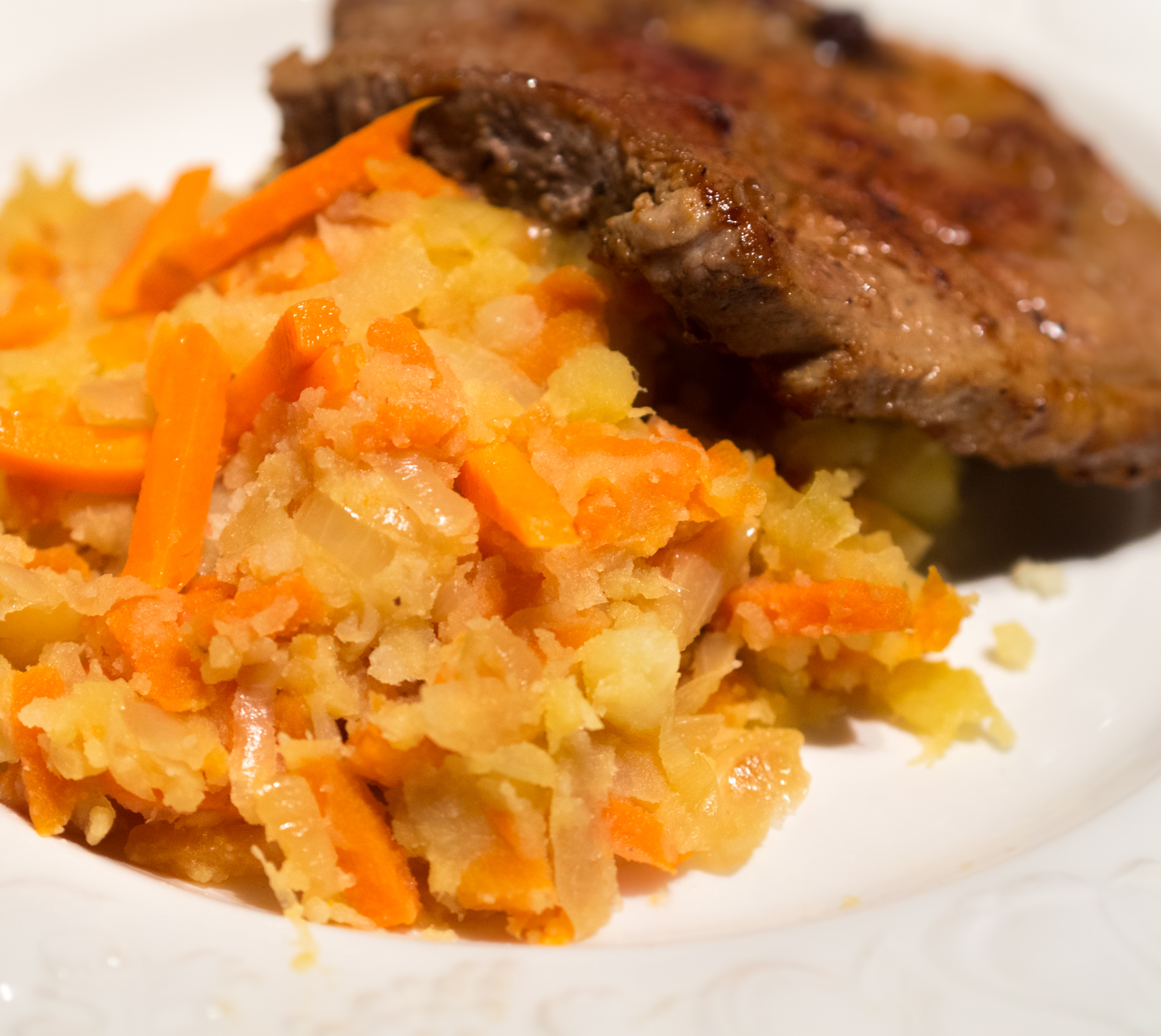
Hutspot with karbonade (pork chop)

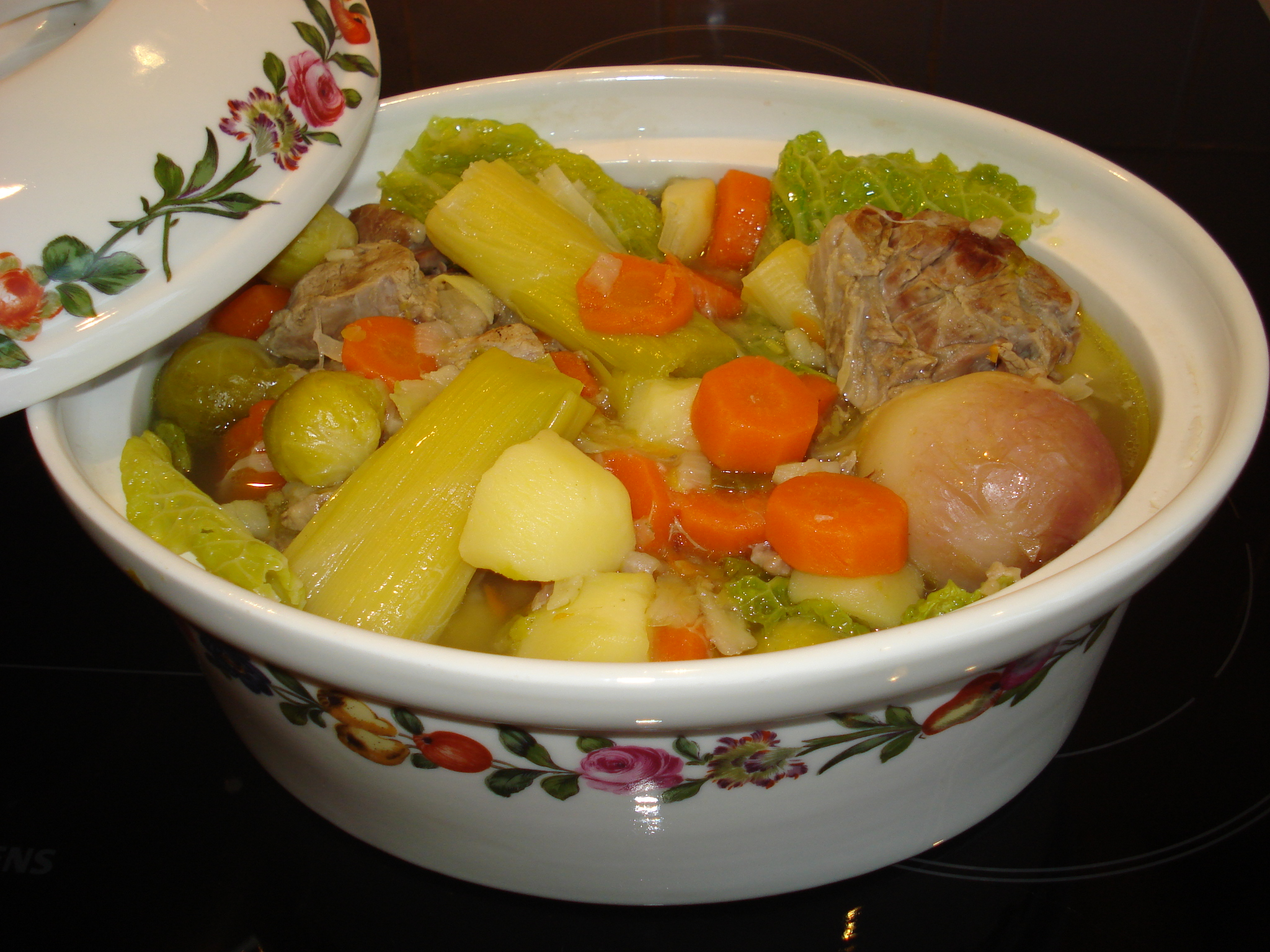
Flemish hutsepot

Hutspot (Dutch: [ˈɦʏtspɔt]), hochepot (French), or hotchpotch (English), is a dish of boiled and mashed potatoes, carrots, and onions with a long history in traditional Dutch cuisine. Hutspot is also found in Indonesian cuisine due to their colonial ties.

== History of the dish ==
According to legend, the recipe came from the food found in the cooking pots left behind by hastily departing Spanish soldiers after the end of the Siege of Leiden in 1574 during the Eighty Years' War. When the liberators breached the dikes of the lower-lying polders surrounding the city, the fields around the city flooded with about a foot (30 cm) of water. As there were few—if any—high points, the Spanish soldiers camping in the fields were essentially flushed out, leaving behind most of their equipment. This included, according to legend, prepared hutspot, which was feasted upon by the famished population after their year-long siege.

The anniversary of this event, known as Leidens Ontzet, is still celebrated every October 3 in Leiden and by Dutch expatriates around the world. Traditionally, the celebration includes consumption of hutspot.

Hutspot is normally cooked with klapstuk in the same vessel. Klapstuk is a cut of beef from the rib section. It is marbled with fat and responds well to slow cooking in hutspot. If klapstuk is not available, then smoked bacon is commonly substituted. The carrots used are generally of the type known as winterpeen (winter carrots), which give the dish its distinctive flavour ordinary carrots cannot match.

The first European record of the potato is as late as 1537, by the Spanish conquistador Juan de Castellanos, and the crop spread quite slowly throughout Europe from thereon. The original legend thus likely refers to what the Dutch call a 'sweet potato' or pastinaak, which is a parsnip; this vegetable played a similar role in Dutch cuisine prior to the use of the potato as a staple food.

The term hutspot (which can be roughly translated as "shaken pot") is similar to the English term hotchpot and Middle French hochepot, both of which used to identify a type of meat-and-barley stew that became synonymous with a confused jumble of mixture, later referred to as 'hotchpotch' or 'hodge-podge'. In noting the etymological connection, the Oxford English Dictionary records 'hochepot' as a culinary term from 1440, more than a century before the Siege of Leiden. In The Tale of Melibeus (c. 1386), Chaucer wrote, "you have cast all their words in an hochepoche", but that early use probably referred to its legal sense in English law (recorded from 1292) as a blending of properties. Later uses certainly referred to its culinary sense.

== Similar foods ==
More a hearty meal than a side dish, hutspot is very popular during Dutch winters. Related Dutch mashed potato dishes such as stamppot include boerenkool ("farmers' cabbage" or kale), andijvie (endive), spruitjes (brussels sprouts) or zuurkool (sauerkraut), generally with some rookworst (smoked sausage) or smoked bacon. However, the chunky texture of hutspot distinguishes it from other more smoothly pureed potato-based dishes.

The Swedish dish rotmos – "root mash" – is similar, save for the onions which are substituted with swede (kålrot). Potch, a traditional Welsh accompaniment to meat dishes, is likewise made with mashed potato, carrot, swede, parsnip and sometimes other root vegetables. In the UK and other countries, a similar dish of chopped potato, onions and more is referred to as a hash.

Despite the similar name, hutspot is a distinct dish from the Flemish hutsepot, a meat stew with unmashed vegetables.
