= Hochepot =

Dutch meat and vegetable stew

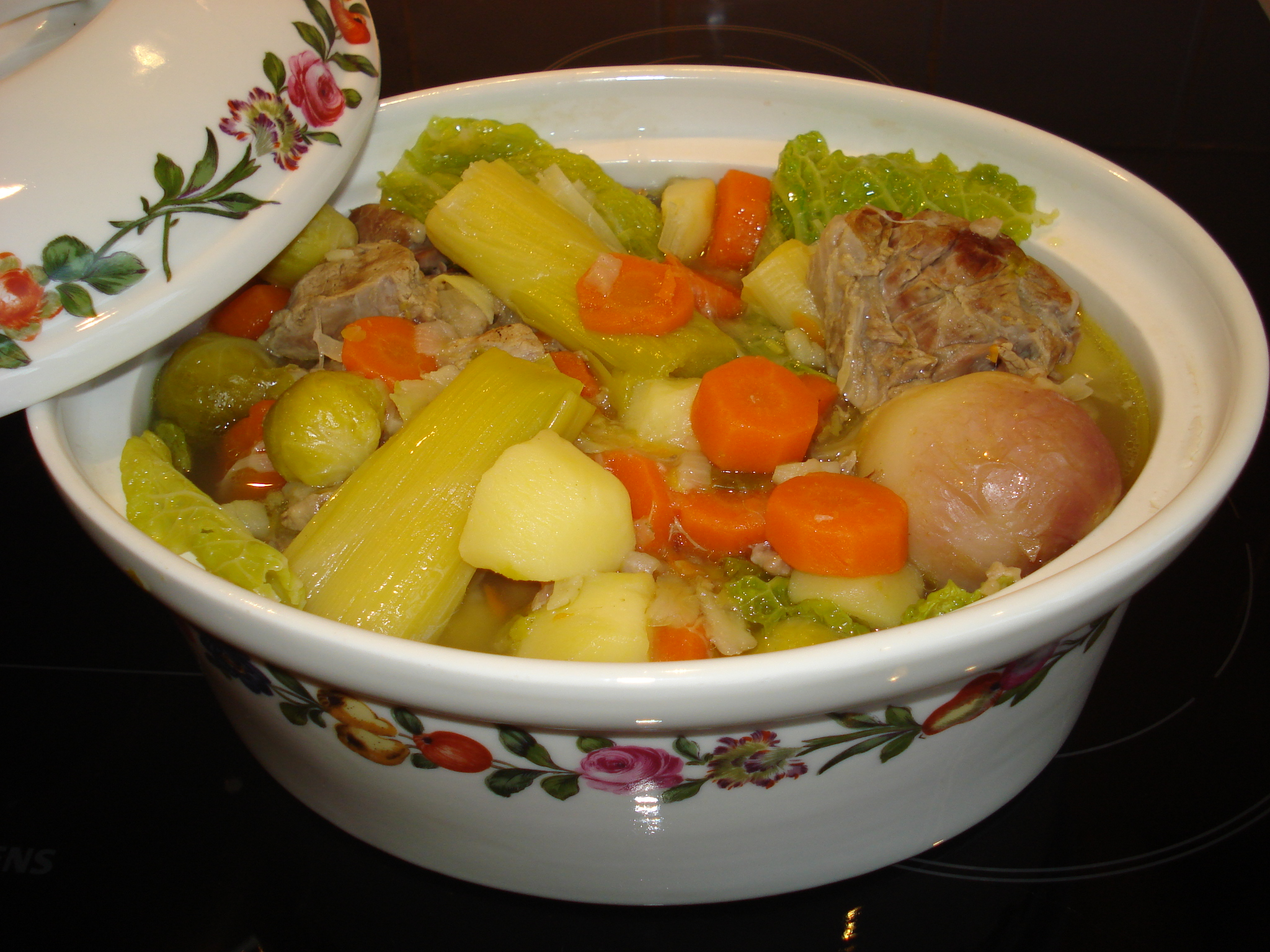
Hochepot

The hochepot (Dutch: hutsepot) is a stew eaten in the Nord-Pas-de-Calais region of France, and in Flanders and Hainaut in Belgium. Its origins go back to the Middle Ages and its first known recipes are in the Manuscript of Sion, the oldest treatise on cooking written in French around the 13th century. Although almost the same word is used in both Dutch and French, it has nothing to do with Dutch hutspot, which is a dish made from mashed potatoes.

It is a stew made with oxtail, shoulder of mutton, salted bacon, and vegetables.

== Historical background ==
Le Viandier de Taillevent, the oldest manuscript of which was written in the 14th century, possesses only one hochepot recipe, with poultry. The oldest version remains the one in the Manuscript of Sion. This reads: "Hochepot de poullaile metez par membres surfrire en saing de lart prenez ung pou de pain brullé & des foyes deffais de vin & du boillon de beuf metez boulir vostre grain affinez gingembre canelle grene de paradis deffait de verjus et doit estre noiret & cler".

Its modern editor affirms that "the different versions of the Viandier are rewritings and enlargements of the original version of the manuscript of Sion, prior to the presumed birth of Taillevent".

== See also ==
- List of stews
- Coddle
