= By Love Possessed (film) =

1961 film

- Theatrical release poster
- Directed by: John Sturges
- Written by: Charles Schnee (as "John Dennis")
- Based on: By Love Possessed by James Gould Cozzens
- Produced by: Walter Mirisch
- Starring: Lana Turner; Efrem Zimbalist Jr. Jason Robards; George Hamilton
- Cinematography: Russell Metty
- Edited by: Ferris Webster
- Music by: Elmer Bernstein
- Distributed by: United Artists
- Release date: July 19, 1961 (U.S.)
- Running time: 115 minutes
- Country: United States
- Language: English
- Box office: $2 million

By Love Possessed is a 1961 American drama film distributed by United Artists. The movie was directed by John Sturges, and written by Charles Schnee, based on the novel by James Gould Cozzens.

Lana Turner, Efrem Zimbalist Jr., Jason Robards Jr., George Hamilton and Susan Kohner head the cast. Hamilton called it "an Ivy League Peyton Place". The supporting cast features Thomas Mitchell, Barbara Bel Geddes, Everett Sloane, Yvonne Craig, Carroll O'Connor, and Jean Willes.

The theme song is performed by Vic Damone. This was director Sturges' first film project after his Western classic, The Magnificent Seven.

On July 19, 1961, the film became the first in-flight movie to be shown on a regular basis on a scheduled airline flight, by Trans World Airlines to its first-class passengers.

Walter Mirsch later said "The lack of success either artistically or commercially of By Love Possessed... was a psychological and emotional blow as well as a huge personal disappointment."

== Plot ==
In a Massachusetts law firm, Arthur Winner, Julius Penrose and Noah Tuttle are equal partners. Each has an ongoing problem in his personal life.

Clarissa, married to Arthur, feels unloved. Marjorie, Julius' wife, has to contend with his self-loathing, the result of a car crash that left him crippled. He is depressed and believes Marjorie no longer finds him desirable. The complex emotions eventually lead to an affair between Marjorie and Arthur.

Warren Winner, Arthur's rebellious and irresponsible son, is expected to marry Noah's wealthy ward, Helen Detweiler, but he is not in love with her. Warren instead loses himself in a fling with a prostitute, Veronica Kovacs, who angrily reacts to his disinterest in pursuing an ongoing relationship by accusing him of rape. Warren flees rather than face the charges in court. Helen is so distraught, she commits suicide.

The firm has represented Helen's financial affairs, but when Arthur looks into it, he discovers that Noah has embezzled $60,000 from Helen's account (although for a worthy cause: to keep the town's struggling streetcar operation afloat). One by one, everyone is confronted about owning up to their responsibilities, beginning with Warren, who on Marjorie's advice turns himself in to the law to fight the accusations against him.

== Cast ==
- Lana Turner as Marjorie Penrose
- Efrem Zimbalist Jr. as Arthur Winner
- Jason Robards Jr. as Julius Penrose
- George Hamilton as Warren Winner
- Susan Kohner as Helen Detweiler
- Thomas Mitchell as Noah Tuttle
- Barbara Bel Geddes as Clarissa Winner
- Everett Sloane as Dr. Reggie Shaw
- Yvonne Craig as Veronica Kovacs
- Gilbert Green as Mr. Woolf
- Frank Maxwell as Jerry Brophy
- Carroll O'Connor as Bernie Breck
- Jean Willes as Junie McCarthy

== Production ==
Film rights to the novel were purchased by United Artists who originally planned to produce it with Seven Arts. When Seven Arts and United Artists terminated their agreement, United Artists took possession of the material and approached Walter Mirisch to produce. (There were two other properties as well, West Side Story and Two for the Seesaw.) Mirsch hired Charle Schnee to write the script which was offered to John Sturges who agreed to direct.

Lana Turner agreed to star and the male lead was given to Efrem Zimbalist Jr. Mirsch said "We hoped that casting him with Lana in our picture would make him a motion-picture star." Warren Beatty turned down the role played by George Hamilton. Charlton Heston also turned down a lead role.

According to Mirsch, Lana Turner constantly demanded script changes. Isobel Lennart did some work on the script. The changes upset Schnee who used a pseudonym, "John Denis".

Mirsch admitted Sturges "was certainly more at home with male-oriented, action subjects than soap opera... but I was guilty of ignoring my own misgivings and of wanting to keep him involved in one of our projects rather than letting him accept an assignment elsewhere while we were doing the script preparation on The Great Escape."

John Sturges later recalled he "liked the original script" that Schnee wrote but "in a series of things which came about it went aground. Five different sets of minds. What Miss Lana Turner thought. What Walter Mirisch thought. What United Artists thought. What Charlie Schnee thought... By the time we were ready to go I would never have made the picture if I had my choice."

Efrem Zimbalist Jr. had a more positive memory of the experience. In an interview with American Legends website, the late actor recalled: "I read the Cozzens novel and loved it. It was the big novel that year but the screenplay turned out to be unshootable. We sat down with John Sturges, the director, and re-wrote it scene by scene as we went along. Lana Turner and Jason Robards were in it. Jason played my law partner. We all got along very friendly. John Sturges probably had the best cameraman in Hollywood, Russell Metty. There was a golden bronze glow to the whole movie which was the result of his lighting."

== See also ==
- List of American films of 1961

== Notes ==
- Mirisch, Walter (2008). I thought we were making movies, not history. University of Wisconsin Press.
