= By Love Possessed (novel) =

1957 novel by James Gould Cozzens

- First edition
- Author: James Gould Cozzens
- Cover artist: Johannes Troyer
- Language: English
- Publisher: Harcourt Brace and Company
- Publication date: 1957
- Publication place: United States
- Media type: Print
- Pages: 570

By Love Possessed is a novel written by James Gould Cozzens and published on August 26, 1957, by Harcourt Brace and Company, and became a critically acclaimed best-seller. In 1960, it was awarded the William Dean Howells Medal, an award given every five years to the best novel of the previous five years.

The novel was turned into a feature film in which Lana Turner co-starred.

By Love Possessed was one of Cozzens' "professional novels", whose stories presented fully developed characters and placed a special emphasis on the details of their work.

== Plot ==
The novel is set in the small town of Brocton, Pennsylvania, in roughly the mid-1950s. The story follows Arthur Winner Jr., an attorney, through 49 hours of his life. During this time, he frequently reminisces about earlier times, remembering town residents who have been dead for years, such as Arthur Winner Sr.

Arthur Jr. is a partner in the law firm his father founded in partnership with Noah Tuttle. As a young man, Arthur married Noah's daughter, Hope; they had three children, two sons and a daughter. The elder son, Warren, died during World War II. Hope died a few years later after giving birth to Arthur's daughter. Arthur is now married to a somewhat younger woman named Clarissa, who had been his daughter's tennis coach. The law practice currently consists of Arthur, Noah, and another man named Julius Penrose. It gradually emerges in the course of the story that Arthur had a brief but intense affair with Marjorie Penrose, Julius' wife, after Hope's death.

Two cases preoccupy Arthur during the course of the novel. The first concerns the probate of the estate of Michael McCarthy; the second is the arrest of Ralph Detweiler (brother of the firm's dedicated secretary Helen Detweiler) for rape. Arthur is also called on to deal with a new pastor in the Episcopal Church, who is asking him to take a role in the leadership of the parish.

Arthur also meets with one of Marjorie's friends, a woman named Pratt who wants to discuss Marjorie's interest in converting to Catholicism. (Julius, though not an especially religious Protestant, is fiercely opposed to Catholicism.)

Many years earlier, a trolley line had been built in the town, and Noah Tuttle had encouraged such clients as Michael McCarthy to invest in it. The trolley company went bankrupt, however, due to the rise of the automobile. Noah handled the bankruptcy case and, to the amazement of all, managed to return some money to the investors. The novel, however, begins to hint at a darker side to Noah's brilliance. He ridicules an elderly woman for wanting to move some of her funds from bonds into stocks. He bristles at the suggestion that the endowment of the parish could be transferred to management by the dioceses. During a hearing which Arthur supervises, Noah has an outburst when questioned about the assets of the McCarthy estate.

Arthur concludes that Ralph Detweiler, though selfish and cowardly, is probably innocent of the rape charge, and he expects to have the case dismissed. But Ralph jumps bail and flees to New York. Ralph's sister Helen, obsessed with respectability, commits suicide in shame.

As Arthur examines the records that Helen had been maintaining, he discovers that Noah has been embezzling from the trusts that he managed—this was the source of the money from the bankruptcy settlement. Noah embezzled $200,000 from the "Orcutt bequest" and has since been manipulating the money in his trusts, robbing Peter to pay Paul while attempting to replenish the funds. Arthur also learns that Julius Penrose has been aware of the embezzlement for some time. But Julius urges Arthur to keep quiet, hinting that he is aware of Arthur's affair with his wife, and that he is grateful that he has been silent about that. Arthur contemplates his position, where there are no good choices. He says, "Life, that has unfairly served so many others, at last unfairly serves me."

== Main characters ==
Arthur Winner – A middle-aged small town lawyer. He is the central character.

Hope Winner (deceased) - Arthur's first wife, who died giving birth to his now teenage daughter.

Clarissa Winner – Arthur's second wife, who was his daughter's tennis coach, is considerably younger than Arthur. She is a more passionate lover than his first wife was, and he feels somewhat guilty about enjoying himself so much. An extended love-making passage about Arthur and Clarissa is highly praised by some critics and derided by others.

Arthur Winner, Senior (deceased) – Arthur's father and (with Noah Tuttle) founder of his law firm. He is referred to as the "Man of Reason".

Warren Winner (deceased) - Arthur's elder son, whom he found ungovernable. He was expelled from boarding school for striking a teacher. The flashback scene where Arthur is told the circumstances of Warren's death is set at a base similar to that of Guard of Honor, an earlier Cozzens novel. Warren's death, along with that of several others, was a direct result of his reckless flying in disobedience of orders. (He is reminiscent of Lieutenant Colonel Benny Carricker, one of the key characters in Guard of Honor.)

Julius Penrose – Arthur's partner. Julius's long commentary on why he detests Catholicism is one of the more controversial parts of the book.

== Controversy ==
By Love Possessed was an immediate commercial and critical success. It was on The New York Times Best Seller list for 34 weeks, holding the number-two position below Peyton Place and then number 1 for several months, before Anatomy of a Murder displaced it. Over 500,000 copies were initially sold. The Reader's Digest condensed version sold over 3,000,000.

Initial reviews were overwhelmingly favorable. However, there was a reaction to the book itself; the extent of the positive reviews and a Time magazine September 2, 1957, cover a story about Cozzens, "The Hermit of Lambertville". Cozzens was criticized for the denseness of his style and unrealism in conversations. He was also criticized for being an upholder of "the Establishment", and having a pessimistic view of human potential. There is little dispute about him having those viewpoints. He was also criticized as a bigot.

At one point in the book, Noah refers to "Jew lawyer tricks", and another character defends the previous generation's attitude towards Jews. Julius Penrose's extended disquisition on Catholicism, and the absurdity of Marjorie's friend named Mrs. Pratt (her explanation of "things" to Arthur) both led to charges of anti-Catholicism. There was also more than a hint of a condescending attitude towards African-Americans, represented in the Revere family, which had provided servants to only the "best families" in town for generations. The charge of anti-Semitism was the strongest, and was reinforced by the most critical article on the book appearing in Commentary. Cozzens' defenders point out that Cozzens, far from being discriminatory, had a fairly low opinion of the entire human race. They also point out that the only person he was close to was his wife, who was Jewish.

Dwight Macdonald's Commentary article, a hostile review of By Love Possessed which he titled "By Cozzens Possessed, a Review of Reviews", ignited a critical firestorm. McDonald characterized the success of By Love Possessed as "the most alarming literary news of the year." Macdonald's review has been both credited with "eviscerating" Cozzens and blamed for having ruined Cozzens' career. It is still cited as one of the high points of Macdonald's career, and one of the best examples of a damning book review. Macdonald's review did not prevent the American Academy of Arts and Letters from awarding By Love Possessed the William Dean Howells Medal in 1960, for the most prestigious work of fiction in the last five years. However, the Commentary article itself became a significant part of American literary history, as it resulted in By Love Possessed being best known to many people from Macdonald's review.

== Publishing history ==
- New York: Harcourt Brace 1957.
- New York: Harcourt Brace 2nd printing for Book of the Month Club.
- New York: Harcourt Brace four additional printings.
- London: Longmans Green 1958
- New York: Crest 1959. Paperback.
- Harmondsworth: Penguin 1960. Paperback
- New York: Harcourt Brace and World- Harvest paperback 1967.

== Awards ==
William Dean Howells Medal, 1960

== Sources ==
- James Gould Cozzens A Life Apart by Matthew J. Bruccoli. Harcourt Brace Jovanavitch 1983.
- New Acquist of True Experience edited by Matthew J. Bruccoli. Southern Illinois University Press 1973.
- The Novels of James Gould Cozzens by Frank Bracher. Harcourt Brace 1959.
- James Gould Cozzens - A Checklist compiled by James B. Merriwether. Detroit: Gale Research Company 1972.
- '"By Cozzens Possessed – A Review of Reviews" by Dwight MacDonald. Commentary. March 1958.
- "Return of the Repressed" by John Thompson. Commentary. September 1968. (This is a review of Morning, Noon and Night, Cozzens's final novel, but there is extensive discussion of the controversy.)
