= Hotchpot =

In civil and property law, hotchpot (sometimes referred to as hotchpotch or the hotchpotch rule) is the blending, combining or offsetting of property (typically gifts) to ensure equality of a later division of property.

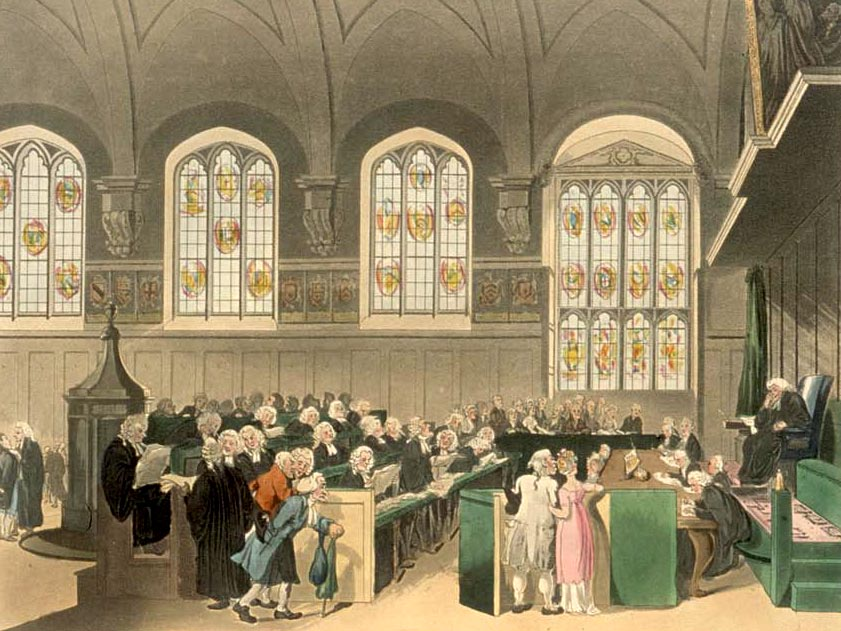
The Court of Chancery, Plate 22 of Microcosm of London (1808).

The name hotch-pot is taken from a kind of pudding, and is derived from the French word hocher, or "shake." It was used as early as 1292 as a legal term, and from the 15th century in cooking for a sort of broth with many ingredients (see Hodge-Podge soup), and so it is used figuratively for any heterogeneous mixture.

== Use ==
It commonly arises in cases of divorce financial proceedings often in the guise of other names and general principles used.

Hotchpot remains of occasional use in a dwindling range of jurisdictions worldwide to divide up a deceased person's estate subsequent to gift(s) which the local law considers:

- "advanced" under general applicable intestacy rules or family/other trusts by the donor (also known as a settlor where an express trust has been made or as an intestate where he has deceased and had no valid Will); or
- adeemed by satisfaction which is the term used when specifically referring to a valid Will made by the deceased (testator/testatrix) — ademption.

== By jurisdiction ==
=== Scotland ===
The principle exists in the law of Scotland in cases of succession and is known as collatio inter liberos.

=== South Africa ===
Hotchpot exists in South Africa also with respect to succession under the name "collation".

=== Canada ===
In Canada the presumption of advancement is applied such that in most Canadian provinces, the receipt of property or land that would otherwise be disposed by will, by a beneficiary in advance, of that will, may be part or all of their entitlement under the will. Most provinces explicitly do not require the return of the advancement, and provide for its valuation as of the time of receipt not death. As with the original "pain of being excluded from the distribution", a refusal to provide such valuation could be a rationale for exclusion from receiving new property.

For instance, in Nova Scotia, "if a child or grandchild of a person who has died wholly intestate has been advanced by the intestate by portion, the portion shall be reckoned... as part of the estate of the intestate distributable according to law" and valued as of the time of receipt not death."

=== United States ===
==== Estate Law ====
Certain state laws refer to hotchpot in describing the laws of intestate succession (i.e. succession without a will). See, for example, Virginia Code § 64.2-206. Advancements brought into hotchpot.

==== Internal Revenue Code ====
Hotchpot is slang for the blended group of Section 1231 "Gains and Losses" of the U.S. tax code. According to the code, a section 1231 gain is:

1. Any recognized gain on the sale or exchange of property used in the trade or business, and
2. Any recognized gain from compulsory/involuntary conversion of
  1. Property used in the trade or business, or
  2. Any capital asset which is held for more than one year and is held in connection with a trade or business or a transaction entered into for profit
3. Into other property or money
4. Because of
  1. Total or partial destruction
  2. Theft or seizure
  3. An exercise of the power of requisition or condemnation
  4. Threat or imminence of such exercise

A section 1231 loss is any loss that occurs under the same circumstances required for a section 1231 gain. Under this definition, the term “property used in the trade or business” is subject to the limitations of Section 1231(b) of the Internal Revenue Code. Additionally, A capital asset is property held by the taxpayer, whether or not that property is connected with his trade or business, but not that which falls into the eight categories set forth in Section 1221(a). Those eight sections are:

1. Property held by the taxpayer primarily for sale to customers, or stock or inventory
2. Property used in a trade or business which is subject to depreciation in section 167, or real property used in trade or business
3. A copyright, composition, letter/memo, or something similar, held by the person who made the property, or, in the case of letter/memo, for whom the property was prepared/produced, or the person who determines the basis of such property
4. Accounts or notes receivable acquired in the normal course of trade or business for services rendered or sale of property to customers from stock/inventory
5. A publication of the U.S. Government which is received by the Government or one of its agencies, unless it is purchased at a public sale price and is held by the taxpayer who received it or the taxpayer who determines its basis
6. Any commodities derivative financial instrument held by such a dealer, unless the Secretary of the Treasury is satisfied that the instrument has no connection to the holder’s activities as a dealer and the instrument is clearly identified in the dealer’s records as such before the close of the day on which it was acquired, originated, or entered into
7. Any hedging transaction clearly identified as such before the close of the day on which it was acquired, originated, or entered into
8. Supplies of the type regularly used/consumed by the taxpayer in the ordinary course of trade/business

Hotchpot gains and losses are given preferential status by Section 1231 of the code, a taxpayer-friendly policy that dates back to the World War II era. This preferential status allows hotchpot gains and losses to be treated as long-term capital gains and losses when the gains are greater than the losses (thereby treating the net gain at a more favorable tax rate), and allows them to be treated as ordinary income and ordinary losses when the gains are less than or equal to the losses (thereby allowing the losses to cancel out the income) (Id. at 522.) Under the code, long-term capital gains are gains from the sale or exchange of a capital asset held for more than one year, if and to the extent that such gain is considered when computing gross income. Long-term capital losses are those from the sale or exchange of a capital asset held for more than one year, if and to the extent that such losses are considered in computing taxable income.

While the average taxpayer may have no need to identify "1231 gains and losses" as "Hotchpot gains and losses," that taxpayer likely benefits from the preferential tax treatment.

In addition, section 1231(a)(4)(C) contains a special rule for the purposes of determining whether a § 1231 gain or § 1231 loss enters the hotchpot. This subsection states that if recognized losses from an involuntary conversion as a result of casualty or from theft, of any property used in the trade or business or of any capital asset held for more than one year, exceed the recognized gains from an involuntary conversion of any such property as a result of casualty or from theft, such losses and gains do not enter the hotchpot. Thus, section 1231 does not apply to gains and losses resulting from casualties and thefts if the losses exceed the gains. The practical effect of this subsection is that net losses from such involuntary conversions will be treated as ordinary income (abolished by s1(2) Law Reform (Succession) Act 1995 in intestacy cases from 1 January 1996).

=== England and Wales ===
In English law, Hotch-pot or hotch-potch was the name given to a rule of equity whereby a person, interested along with others in a common fund, and having already received something from the same interest, is required to offset what has been so acquired when his share of the common fund is considered, on pain of being excluded from the common fund distribution. The principle equated to collatio bonorum under Roman law: emancipated children, to share any final inheritance afforded by their freed forebear shared equally with unemancipated siblings, were required to bring their inherited property from that person into the equation. In England and Wales hotchpot was abolished for persons dying intestate from and including the first day of 1996, by section 1(2) of the Law Reform (Succession) Act 1995. The word would likely be shunned in the updated language divorce proceedings, which typically apply similar principles to recent large inter-marital gifts (i.e. between husband and wife). The word hodge-podge colloquially is not slang but rather a synonym for a jumble or mishmash.

The hotchpot rule also applies to cross-border insolvency where bankruptcy proceedings are taking place in more than one jurisdiction with respect to the same debtor. The leading case is Banco de Portugal v Waddell (1880) 5 App Cas 161 where the House of Lords held that creditors who had participated in the Portuguese bankruptcy proceedings would be permitted to participate in the English bankruptcy proceedings as well, however, they would have to account for the sums which they had received in the Portuguese proceedings, and would not be entitled to receive any distributions in England until the amount distributed to the other creditors was equal to what they had received in Portugal:

"Every creditor coming in to prove under, and to take the benefit of, the English liquidation, must do so on terms of the English law of bankruptcy: he cannot be permitted to approbate and reprobate, to claim the benefit of that law, and at the same time insist on retaining as against it, any preferential right inconsistent with the equality of distributions intended by that law, which he may have obtained either by use of legal process in a foreign country, or otherwise."

That position was reaffirmed in different terms by the Privy Council in Cleaver v Delta American Reinsurance Co [2001] UKPC 6 per Lord Scott:

"The authorities establish the principle that if a company is being wound up in an English liquidation and also in a liquidation in a foreign country, a creditor who has proved and received a dividend in the foreign liquidation may not receive a dividend in the English liquidation without bringing into hotchpot his foreign dividend."

== See also ==
- Collation
