= Gallimaufry (book) =

2020 collection of essays by Joseph Epstein

Gallimaufry: A Collection of Essays, Reviews, Bits
- Author: Joseph Epstein
- Language: English
- Subject: Collection of essays
- Publisher: Axios Press
- Publication date: October 7, 2020
- Publication place: United States
- Media type: Print, hardback
- Pages: 505
- ISBN: 978-1-604-19128-8

Gallimaufry, A Collection of Essays, Reviews, Bits, is a 2020 collection of 57 essays, book reviews, and shorter pieces all by Joseph Epstein. Essay topics in this collection include authors, literature, biographies, writing, language (its use and misuse), universities, culture, Chicago and humor. The collection is organized into three sections: (i) Essays and Reviews, longer pieces, #1-39 below, (ii) Bits and Pieces, shorter pieces, #40-56 below and (iii) Edward Redux, an essay on his friend and mentor Edward Shils. All of these essays were previously published in journals and anthologies including The Weekly Standard, Commentary (magazine), Claremont Review of Books, Wall Street Journal and others.

== Essays collected ==
List of essays in Gallimaufry
#	Title	Date	Topic(s)
1	The Bookish Life	2018	
2	Body without Soul	2020	book by Bill Bryson
3	Chicago, Then and Now	2018	
4	Jewish Jokes	2018	also Jeremy Dauber's book "Jewish Comedy"
5	Short Attention Span	2017	
6	Intellectual Marines in Little Magazines	2008	journalism, also Partisan Review, Kenyon Review and others
7	The American Language	2018	H. L. Mencken and his book The American Language
8	University of Chicago Days	2017	
9	Frittering Prizes	1997	literature prizes
10	The Tzaddick of the Intellectuals	2017	Leon Wieseltier, Tzadik
11	The Menace of Political Correctness	2019	
12	Hail, Mommsen	2018	Theodore Mommsen
13	Big Julie	2019	Julius Caesar
14	Our Gladiators	2018	Tiger Woods and professional athletes
15	Diamonds Are Forever	2016	baseball
16	What’s the Story?	2017	the case for conservatism
17	University Presidents	2019	
18	Immaturity on Campus	2020	
19	Heinrich Heine	2018	
20	Joseph Roth	2018	
21	Stefan Zweig	2019	
22	Vasily Grossman	2011	
23	Evelyn Waugh	2017	also biography by Philip Eade
24	P. G. Wodehouse	2018	
25	Tom Wolfe	2018	
26	Susan Sontag, Savant-Idiot	2019	Susan Sontag and biography by Benjamin Moser
27	Lionel Trilling	2019	
28	Proust’s Duchesses	2018	biography by Caroline Weber
29	Denis Diderot	2019	also biography by Robert Zaretzsky
30	Isaiah Berlin	2016	collection of his letters by Henry Hardy
31	Johnson-Boswell	2019	book by Leo Damrosch about Samuel Johnson
32	Stop Your Blubbering	2019	book by Jonathan Ree about philosophy
33	George Gershwin	2009	biography by Walter Rimler
34	Nelson Algren	2019	biography by Colin Asher
35	Essayism	2018	book by Brian Dillon
36	Alcibiades	2019	biography by David Stuttard
37	Big Bill Tilden	2016	Bill Tilden and biography by Allen Hornblum
38	The Semicolon	2019	book by Cecilia Watson
39	The Meritocracy	2019	book by Daniel Markovits
40	Close Shaves	2018	shaving
41	Location, Location, Location	2018	Evanston, Illinois neighborhood
42	Milt Rosenberg	2018	radio interview program in Chicago
43	Only a Hobby	2018	Anne Fadiman memoir of Clifton Fadiman and wine
44	Hello, Dolly	2018	pet cat
45	Dirty Words	2018	profanity
46	See Me Out	2018	aging and possessions
47	Shabby Chic	2017	casual attire
48	Thoughts and Prayers	2018	condolences and cliches
49	Table It	2018	word use and changing meanings
50	Don’t Hide Your Eyes, Weaponize	2019	word use and misuse
51	Does Not Hug	2017	not embracing
52	In Bad Taste or Not, I’ll Keep My Comic Sans	2019	font
53	Yidiosyncrasies	2018	quirks
54	Sinfood	2017	
55	A Nobel Prize for Marriage	2018	famous married couples
56	Hold the Memorial	2018	funerals, memorial speeches
57	Edward Remembered	2019	Edward Shils -- professor and sociologist

== Reception ==
In The American Spectator Larry Thornberry said "I consider Epstein to be the finest essayist and columnist on active duty today." Thornberry appreciated the wide variety of topics taken up in this collection. He concluded with: "(Epstein's) work is a kind of literary palate cleansing."

At Anecdotal Evidence Patrick Kurp said: "At age eighty-three, Epstein remains our most entertaining, wide-ranging, industrious, learned practitioner of both familiar and critical essays."
