= Hodge-Podge (soup) =

Type of mutton soup

Hodge-podge
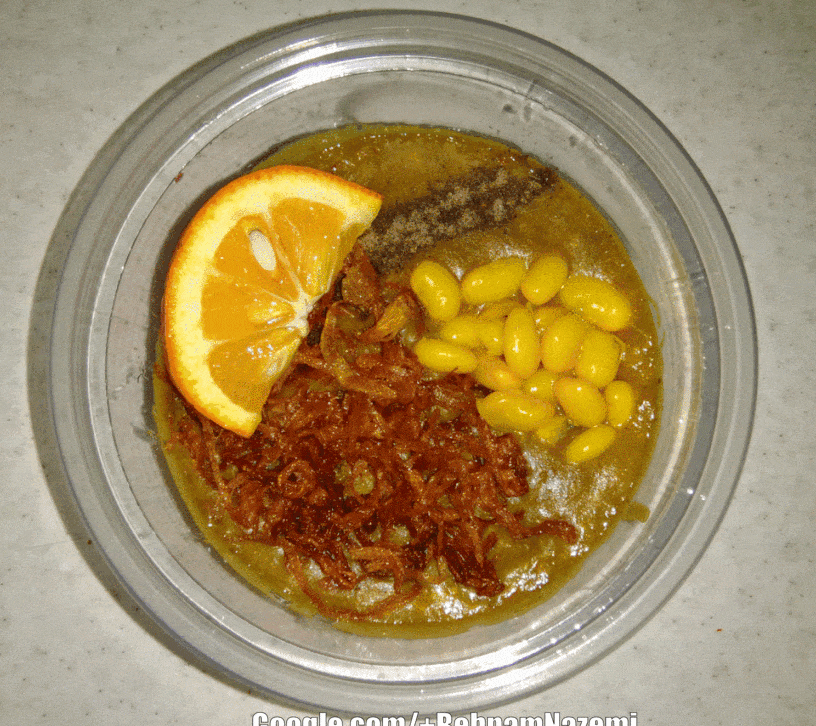
- Alternative names: hotch potch
- Type: Soup or stew
- Region or state: England, North America
- Main ingredients: Mutton, beef, veal or other meat; green vegetables; root vegetables

Hodge-podge or hotch potch (variously capitalised and hyphenated) is a soup or stew, usually based on diced mutton or other meat, with green and root vegetables. It is familiar in different versions in Britain and North America and is particularly associated with Scotland.

== Etymology ==
The Oxford English Dictionary definition is: "A dish made of a mixture of various kinds of meat, vegetables, etc., stewed together" and "esp in Scottish = Hotchpotch – A dish containing a mixture of many ingredients; spec. a thick soup of barley, peas, and other vegetables, and sometimes meat". The word derives from the Anglo-Norman and Middle French hochepot, "a dish containing a mixture of many ingredients, especially a kind of stew made with minced beef or goose and various vegetables".

== History ==
The dish was familiar in medieval times. In The Forme of Cury (c. 1390) a recipe is given for a hotch-potch of goose: (Note: The term is variously spelt in The Forme of Cury: "ochepot" and "hogge pot" appear as variants of "hochepot".)

Take gees and smyte hem on pecys. Cast hem in a pot; do thereto half wyne and Half water; and do thereto a gode quantite of oynonns and erbest. Set it over the fyre, and cover it fast. Make a layor of brede and blode, and lay it therewith. Do thereto powdor-fort, and serve it forth	Take geese and chop them in pieces. Put them in a pot and add half wine and half water, and add a good quantity of onions and herbs. Set it over the fire and cover it tightly. Make a mixture of bread and blood and lay it on it. Season with strong mixed spice and serve.

In The English Huswife (1623) a recipe is described thusly:

you shall take a very large vessell, pot or kettel, and filling it with water, you shall let it on the fire and first put in good thicke gobbets of well fed Beefe and being ready to boile, skimme your pot- when the Beefe is halfe boiled, you shall put in Potato roots, Turneps, and Skirrets: alsolike gobbets of the best Mutton, and the best: Porke; after they have boyled awhile, you shall put in the like gobbets of Venison red, and Fallow, if you have them. then the like gobbets, of Veale, Kidde, and Lamb; a little spaceafter these, the foreparts of a fat Pigge, and a crambd Pulley then put in Spinage, Endive, Succory, Marigold leaves & flowers, Lettice~ Violet leaves, Strawberry leaves, Buglosse and Scallions, all whole and unchoot.

Then when they have boiled a while, put in a Partridge and a Chicken chopt in peeces, with Quailes, Rails; Blackbirds, Larkes, Sparrowes and other small birds all being well and tenderly boiled, season up the broth with good store of Sugar, Cloves, Mace, Cinamon, Ginger and Nutmegge mixt together in a good quantity of Verijuice and salt and so stirre up the pot well from the bottome, then dish it up upon great Chargers, or long Spanish dishes made in the fashion of our English woodden trayes, with good store of Sippets in the bottome • then cover the meate all over with Prunes, Raisins,, and blaunch’t Almonds, boiled in a thing by themselves. then cover the fruite and the whole boiled hearbes, and the hearbes with dices of Orenges and Lemmons, and lay the roots round about the sides of the dish, and strew good store of Sugar over all, and so serve it foorth.

A 16th-century reference occurs in Arthur Golding's version of Metamorphoses: "Out she brought hir a Hotchpotch made of steeped Barlie browne And Flaxe and Coriander seede and other simples more". A Dutch variant, "hutspot", known in the Netherlands since the 16th century, contains potato and cheese as well as the onions and carrots familiar elsewhere. In the 17th century John Dryden refers in an essay to "Memphian hotch-potch, Leeks, and Garlike strong".

In The Art of Cookery Made Plain and Easy (1780), Hannah Glasse specifies a mixture of diced beef, veal and mutton; the vegetables are turnip, celery, carrot and lettuce, and, when in season, peas. She adds some spices not used by some others: cloves and mace. In her 1788 book The Lady's Complete Guide; Or Cookery in All its Branches, Mary Cole does not call for mixed meats, but gives recipes for hodge podges based on either beef, mutton, veal, hare or turtle, with onions and a variety of other vegetables such as a turnips, carrots, leeks and celery. In the 19th century Mrs Beeton similarly gave recipes for hodge podges of a single meat – either beef or mutton.

A 19th century American recipe for hotch potch specifies lean mutton boiled with carrots and turnips, seasoned with salt and pepper. Puréed peas, celery and onion slices are added and the dish is gently simmered before serving. In her 1826 book The Cook and Housewife's Manual, Margaret Dods classes hotch-potch as a "Scotch National Dish", and gives recipes for summer and winter versions of the stew. The former is made with lamb and young vegetables including peas; the latter with beef or mutton and root vegetables.

== 20th and 21st centuries ==
A recipe from the 1924 volume of American Cookery calls for "at least four different kinds" of meat, such as lamb, beef, smoked ham, chicken or other combination, simmered with lettuce, chives, celery and butter. Succotash is added to the pot just before the soup finishes cooking. The soup is garnished with fresh parsley and paprika. In 1925 Henry Smith's The Master Book of Soups noted that hotch potch retained a particular association with Scottish cooking. His version, a soup rather than a stew, is based on lamb stock with peas, beans, turnips, carrots, spring onions, cauliflower and lettuce. A Yorkshire version, more a stew than a soup, calls for mutton or lamb cooked in water, added to a braised mixture of onions, carrots, turnips and celery and simmered before serving.

Paul Newman specifies chicken in his 1985 Newman's Own Cookbook. His recipe differs from others in including potatoes and green peppers. In the Canadian Maritime provinces, hodge podge is a soup based on cream or butter with fresh vegetables. Although it can also be flavoured with meat stock or bacon, in its simplest form it is essentially a vegetarian chowder.

== See also ==
- List of soups
- Hutspot
