= Joseph Epstein (writer) =

American writer (born 1937)

- Born: January 9, 1937 (age 89); Chicago, Illinois, U.S.
- Education: University of Illinois Urbana-Champaign; University of Chicago (BA)
- Occupations: Writer, editor, lecturer
- Spouse: Barbara Maher
- Children: 2
- Writing career
- Pen name: Aristides
- Language: English
- Notable awards: National Humanities Medal

Myron Joseph Epstein (born January 9, 1937) is an American writer who was the editor of the magazine The American Scholar from 1975 to 1997. He has published books on subjects such as Ambition, Snobbery, Envy, Friendship, and Charm, as well as collections of his essays and stories, many of which previously appeared in various publications.

== Early life and education ==
Epstein was born to Maurice and Belle Epstein in Chicago, Illinois on January 9, 1937. He graduated from Senn High School and attended the University of Illinois Urbana-Champaign. He served in the U.S. Army for two years as an enlisted soldier from 1958 to 1960, and received a Bachelor of Arts from the University of Chicago in 1959.

== Career ==
Epstein's essay "Who Killed Poetry?", published in Commentary in 1988, generated discussion in the literary community for decades after its publication.

In 2024, Epstein published an autobiography titled Never Say You've Had a Lucky Life: Especially If You've Had a Lucky Life.

=== Visiting adjunct lecturer (1974–2002) ===
From 1974 to 2002, Epstein was a visiting adjunct lecturer in literature and writing at Northwestern University.

=== Editor of The American Scholar (1975–1997) ===
In 1975, he began serving as the editor of The American Scholar, the magazine of the Phi Beta Kappa society, and wrote for it under the pseudonym "Aristides".

During the 1980s and 1990s, Epstein received increasing criticism for commentary widely regarded as anti-feminist, as well as for his "one-sided" management of the editorial page. He compared feminist scholars at various times to "pit bulls" and "dykes on bikes". In 1991, he was the subject of an op-ed by Joyce Carol Oates calling for his resignation: "It is an embarrassment that Joseph Epstein should have been its editor for so many years. His resignation is long overdue." He met with further criticism for giving cultural conservatives as Gertrude Himmelfarb and Dinesh D’Souza a platform in the journal, and his failure to offer space for their adversaries.

In 1996, the Phi Beta Kappa senate voted to remove Epstein as editor of The American Scholar at the end of 1997. The decision was controversial and Epstein later claimed that he was fired "for being insufficiently correct politically." Some within Phi Beta Kappa attributed the senate's decision to a desire to attract a younger readership for the journal. Upon Epstein's firing, a former president of Phi Beta Kappa said: "He has been driving people crazy for years. What has changed is that more and more senators were elected who are uncomfortable with the totally one-sided views in the journal."

In 2024, Epstein wrote, "The official version given out by Phi Beta Kappa for my cancellation — in those days still known as a firing — was that the magazine was losing subscribers and needed to seek younger readers. Neither assertion was true. In fact, I was canceled because I had failed to run anything in the magazine about academic feminism or race." He added that he had tried to keep the magazine "apolitical". Matthew Hennessey, in an article for which he interviewed Epstein in 2024, wrote: "The notion that some corners of the culture deserve to remain free from petty politics is anathema to the type for whom Mr. Epstein is an object of loathing. The Phi Beta Kappa senate, which has oversight over the American Scholar, was in the late '90s filling up with 'academic feminists and black historians' who 'hated the idea' of Mr. Epstein in the editor's chair, he says. In the end, they got their man. 'I was fired, but, in a way characteristic of academic life, very slowly,' he recounted in an essay at the time. 'I had two years to clean out my desk.' The totalizing philosophy of progressivism, which has in the years since spread from faculty lounge to the sports page, famously has no time for old white males with minds like Mr. Epstein's, which toggles effortlessly between the essays of Michel de Montaigne and headline roster moves of baseball's spring training. Not long after his firing from the American Scholar, Mr. Epstein elected to retire from several successful decades as a literature and writing teacher at Northwestern University. He calls the timing of his exit 'exquisite.' He got out 'before cellphones became universal, before political correctness kicked in in a big way.'"

== Criticism ==
=== Article on homosexuality (1970) ===
In September 1970, Harper's Magazine published an article by Epstein called "Homo/Hetero: The Struggle for Sexual Identity" that used the word "nigger" to describe being gay and was criticized for its perceived homophobia. Epstein wrote that he considered homosexuality "a curse, in a literal sense" and that his sons could do nothing to make him sadder than "if any of them were to become homosexual." Although, Epstein later confirmed that this was not because of any distaste for the homosexual community, but rather because for the time, gay people were discouraged and discriminated, and had to “live in the shadows.” Gay activists characterized the essay as portraying every gay man the author met, or imagined meeting, as predatory, sex-obsessed, and a threat to civilization. In the essay, he says that, if possible, "I would wish homosexuality off the face of the earth," a statement that was interpreted by gay writer and editor Merle Miller as a call to genocide. A sit-in took place at Harper's by members of the Gay Activists Alliance.

In 2015, Epstein wrote an article for The Weekly Standard in which he mentioned the Harper's essay and its coverage on Wikipedia. He did not retract his original essay, but rued that his concessive support for homosexuality "cuts neither ice nor slack. My only hope now is that, on my gravestone, the words Noted Homophobe aren’t carved."

=== Article on Jill Biden (2020) ===
In a December 2020 Wall Street Journal opinion piece, he suggested that Jill Biden stop using the academic title "Dr.," which she earned as a Doctor of Education, saying that it "feels fraudulent, not to say a touch comic." The piece, which opens by addressing her as "Madame First Lady—Mrs. Biden—Jill—kiddo," was criticized on Twitter by several public figures. He also critiqued the title of Biden's dissertation, Student Retention at the Community College Level: Meeting Students' Needs, calling it "unpromising." Jill Biden later responded during an interview on The Late Show with Stephen Colbert, indicating that she was surprised at the tone of the article and at Epstein's use of the word "kiddo" to address her, stating that she was proud of her doctorate, for which she had worked hard.

Northwestern University and its English department, where Epstein worked as a visiting adjunct lecturer from 1974 till 2002, each released a statement condemning his opinion. The university wrote, "Northwestern is firmly committed to equity, diversity and inclusion, and strongly disagrees with Mr. Epstein's misogynistic views," and noted that it was nearly 20 years since his employment there. The university also removed Epstein's page from its website, where he had been listed as an emeritus lecturer of English.

== Awards and recognition ==
- Honorary Doctorate, Adelphi University, 1988
- Heartland Prize – Partial Payments: Essays on Writers and Their Lives.
- National Humanities Medal, National Endowment for the Humanities.
- Ribalow Prize for Fiction – Fabulous Small Jews.

== Selected works ==
- Divorced In America: Marriage In an Age of Possibility (1975)
- Familiar Territory: Observations on American Life (1979)
- Life Sentences: Literary Essays (1980)
- Ambition: The Secret Passion (1981)
- The Middle of My Tether: Familiar Essays (1983)
- Plausible Prejudices: Essays on American Writing (1985)
- Once More Around The Block: Familiar Essays (1987)
- Partial Payments: Essays on Writers & Their Lives (1989)
- The Goldin Boys: Stories (1991)
- A Line Out for a Walk: Familiar Essays (1991)
- Pertinent Players: Essays on The Literary Life (1993)
- With My Trousers Rolled: Familiar Essays (1995)
- Anglophilia, American Style (1997)
- Narcissus Leaves the Pool (1999)
- Snobbery: The American Version (2002)
- Envy (2003)
- Fabulous Small Jews (2003)
- Alexis De Tocqueville: Democracy's Guide (2006)
- Friendship: An Expose (2006)
- In A Cardboard Belt: Essays Personal, Literary and Savage (2007)
- Fred Astaire (2008)
- The Love Song of A. Jerome Minkoff & Other Stories (2010)
- Gossip: The Untrivial Pursuit (2011)
- Essays In Biography (2012)
- Distant Intimacy: A Friendship in the Age of Internet (2013) (co-authored with Frederic Raphael)
- A Literary Education & Other Essays (2014)
- Masters of the Games: Essays & Stories on Sport (2014)
- Where Were We: The Conversation Continues (2015) (co-authored with Frederic Raphael)
- Frozen In Time: Twenty Stories (2016)
- Wind Sprints: Shorter Essays (2016)
- Victimhood: The New Virtue (2017)
- Charm: The Elusive Enchantment (2018)
- The Ideal of Culture: Essays (2018)
- Gallimaufry: A Collection of Essays, Reviews, Bits (2020)
- The Novel, Who Needs It? (2023)
- Familiarity Breeds Content: New and Selected Essays (2024)
- Never Say You've Had a Lucky Life: Especially If You've Had a Lucky Life (2024)
