= Weinberg (surname) =

Weinberg is a German and Jewish-Ashkenazi surname which means vineyard in German. Spellings in other languages include Wainberg, Vainberg, Vaynberg, Вайнберг and Wajnberg.

Weinberg may refer to:

- Abraham Weinberg (1897–1935), US mobster
- Adam S. Weinberg, president of Denison University
- Albert Weinberg (1922–2011), Belgian comics artist
- Alvin M. Weinberg (1915–2006), nuclear physicist and administrator of Manhattan Project
- Binyamin Weinberg (fl. 1972–1984), Israeli footballer
- Brenda Dickson-Weinberg (born 1949), American soap opera actress
- Denah Weinberg, Jerusalem rebbetzin and educator; widow of Noah Weinberg
- Eric Weinberg (born 1959 or 1960), American television producer and screenwriter
- Erick Weinberg (born 1947), theoretical physicist at Columbia University
- George Weinberg (disambiguation)
  - George Weinberg (mobster) (1901–1939), New York mobster and brother of Abraham Weinberg
  - George Weinberg (psychologist) (1929–2017), American psychologist, author and gay activist
- Gerald Weinberg (1933–2018), US computer scientist
- Gerhard Weinberg (born 1928), German-born US World War II historian
- Gladys Davidson Weinberg (1909–2002), American archaeologist
- Gus Weinberg (c. 1865–1952), actor, writer, and composer appearing in early-twentieth-century American films
- Harald Weinberg (born 1957), German politician (The Left)
- Harry Weinberg (1908–1990), Galicia-born US businessman and philanthropist; founder of Harry and Jeanette Weinberg Foundation
- Howie Weinberg (fl. 2011), US music mastering engineer
- Ian Weinberg, former professional soccer player
- Inés Mónica Weinberg de Roca (born 1948), Argentine judge on Buenos Aires Supreme Court and at UN
- Jay Weinberg, drummer and son of Max Weinberg
- Jeanette Weinberg (1910–1989), philanthropist
- Joseph Weinberg (1917–2002), American physicist
- Larry Weinberg (1926–2019), American real estate developer and sports owner
- Loretta Weinberg (born 1935), US politician and New Jersey State Senator
- Marcus Weinberg (born 1967), German politician
- Mark Weinberg (born 1931), South African-born British financier
- Mark Weinberg (judge) (born 1948), Australian lawyer and judge
- Martin S. Weinberg (born 1939), US sociologist and sex researcher
- Max Weinberg, drummer and founder of Jimmy Vivino and the Basic Cable Band, originally known as The Max Weinberg 7
- Michel Weinberg, Russian-born French physician and biologist
- Mieczysław Weinberg or Moishe Vainberg (1919–1996), Polish-born Russian composer
- Moshe Weinberg (1939–1972), Israeli Olympic wrestling coach murdered in the Munich massacre
- Noah Weinberg (1930–2009), Orthodox Jewish rabbi and founder of Aish HaTorah.
- Peter Weinberg (born c. 1957), US businessman
- Richard A. Weinberg (1943–2025), American developmental psychologist
- Robert Weinberg, cancer biologist
- Ron Weinberg, American politician
- Ronald Weinberg, Canadian former television producer and businessman
- Samantha Weinberg (fl. 1994–), British novelist, journalist, travel writer, and Green Party politician under her married name, Samantha Fletcher
- Serge Weinberg, French businessman
- Sidney Weinberg (1891–1969), long-time leader of Goldman Sachs
- Shraga Weinberg (born 1966), Israeli wheelchair tennis player
- Steve Wynn, born Weinberg
- Steven Weinberg (1933–2021), American Nobel Prize–winning physicist
- Wendy Weinberg, American Olympic medalist swimmer
- Wilhelm Weinberg, German physician and geneticist
- Yaakov Weinberg (1923–1999), Canadian Rosh Yeshiva
- Yechiel Yaakov Weinberg (1884–1966), Polish Orthodox rabbi
- Zygfryd Weinberg, Polish athlete

== See also ==
- Weinberg (disambiguation)
- Mark Wainberg (1945–2017), Canadian HIV/AIDS researcher and activist
- Vainberg, surname
- Weinberger, surname
