= Mad Dog =

Mad dog is a phrase commonly applied to rabid dogs.

Mad Dog may also refer to:

== People ==
=== Nickname ===
- Johnny Adair (born 1963), Northern Irish loyalist paramilitary
- Martin Allen (born 1965), English footballer
- Brett Banasiewicz (born 1994), American professional BMX rider
- Charles Brown (1933–1962), American spree killer
- Roger Caron (1938–2012), Canadian robber
- Mad Dog Coll (1908–1932), Irish-American gangster
- David C. Dolby (1946–2010), US Army Medal of Honor recipient
- Charles Gargotta (1900–1950), Italian-American gangster
- Jon Hall (programmer) (born 1950), American computer programmer
- Gene Hatcher (born 1959), American boxer
- Leslie Irvin (serial killer) (1924–1983), 1950s American serial killer
- Charles Kelley (1941–1962), American spree killer
- Bob Lassiter (1945–2006), American radio talk show host
- Vini Lopez (born 1949), American drummer
- Adam MacDougall (born 1975), Australian rugby league player
- Jeff Madden, college football strength and conditioning coach
- Greg Maddux (born 1996), American former baseball pitcher
- Bill Madlock (born 1951), American baseball player
- Mark Madsen (basketball) (born 1976), American basketball coach and former player
- Jim Mandich (1948–2011), American football player
- Jim Mattis (born 1950), American Marine Corps general and Secretary of Defense
- Archie McCafferty, Scottish-born Australian serial killer
- Brian McGlinchey (born 1977), Northern Ireland footballer
- Dominic McGlinchey (1954–1994), leader of the Irish National Liberation Army paramilitary group
- Lewis Moody (born 1978), English rugby union player
- Dan Morgan (bushranger) (1830–1865), Australian bushranger
- Robbie Muir (footballer) (born 1953), Australian rules footballer
- Edgar Ross (boxer) (1949–2012), American boxer
- Chris Russo (born 1959), American sports radio personality
- Joseph "Mad Dog" Taborsky (1924–1960), American spree killer
- Michael Taccetta (born 1947), American mobster
- Dwight White (1949–2008), American football player
- Xu Xiaodong (born 1979), Chinese mixed martial artist
- Wong Yuk-man (born 1951), Hong Kong politician

=== Ring name ===
- Mike Bell (wrestler) (1971–2008), American professional wrestler
- Pierre Lefebvre (1955–1985), French-Canadian professional wrestler
- Michel Martel (1944–1978), Canadian professional wrestler
- Mad Dog McPhie (born 1971), English professional wrestler
- Mad Dog O'Malley, Irish-American professional wrestler
- Maurice Vachon (1929–2013), French-Canadian professional wrestler

== Fictional characters ==
- Mad Dog (comics), various characters
- Buford "Mad Dog" Tannen, from the film Back to the Future Part III
- the title character of Johnny Mad Dog, a 2008 film
- Mad Dog, a character from manga and anime series Haikyu!!
- Mad Dog Branzillo, in the book A Swiftly Tilting Planet by Madeleine L'Engle
- Mad Dog, nickname of Wayne Dobie in the film Mad Dog and Glory
- Mad Dog, from the film Hard Boiled, played by Philip Kwok
- Mad Dog, from the film Ong Bak, played by David Ismalone
- Mad Dog, from the film The Raid: Redemption, played by Yayan Ruhian
- the title character of Mad Dog Morgan, a 1976 Australian bushranger film
- Tommy "Mad Dog" McCulum, from the South African TV series Isidingo
- the title character of Mad Dog McCree, a 1990 laserdisc video game
- Mad Dog, in the Nintendo DS game Contra 4
- Madd Dogg, in the 2004 video game Grand Theft Auto: San Andreas
- The Mad Dog, a 1932 Mickey Mouse cartoon

== Music ==
- Mad Dog (album), by John Entwistle
- "Mad Dog", a song from the album Holiday by America
- "Mad Dog", a song from the album The House of Blue Light by Deep Purple
- "Mad Dog", a song from the album Sub-Basement by Pentagram

== Other uses ==
- Mad Dog (TV series), a 2017 South Korean television series
- "Mad Dog", an episode of the 1975 television series Survivors
- Mad Dog Knives, a knifemaking company
- Mad Dog Oil Field, in the Gulf of Mexico
- Mad Dog Inc., a group of Texas authors including Bud Shrake
- MD 20/20, nicknamed 'Mad Dog', a flavored fortified wine from Mogen David
- MadDog, the mascot of the Northeastern University Rugby Club
- McDonnell Douglas MD-80, a family of commercial jet liners nicknamed Mad Dog

== See also ==
- The mad dog of the Middle East, a phrase used by U.S. President Ronald Reagan to describe Libyan leader Muammar Gaddafi
- Wanderlei Silva (born 1976), Brazilian mixed martial artist nicknamed Cachorro Louco (Portuguese for "mad dog")
- Mad-dog skullcap (Scutellaria lateriflora), a plant
- Mad Dog Coll (disambiguation)
- Mad Dogs (disambiguation)
- Mad Dogs and Englishmen (disambiguation)
- Goro Majima, known as the "Mad Dog of Shimano" in the Yakuza video game series
- Wściekły pies (English: mad dog), Polish cocktail
