= Abraham Weinberg =

Jewish-American mobster

- NYPD mugshot of Abraham Weinberg
- Born: January 7, 1900; Manhattan, New York, U.S.
- Died: c. September 9, 1935 (aged 35); Manhattan, New York, U.S.
- Other name: Bo
- Occupations: Hitman, bootlegger
- Spouse: Anna May Turner

Abraham "Bo" Weinberg (January 7, 1900 – c. September 9, 1935) was a Jewish New York City mobster who became a hitman and chief lieutenant for the Prohibition-era gang boss Dutch Schultz. As Schultz expanded his bootlegging operations into Manhattan during Prohibition, he recruited Abe Weinberg and his brother George into his gang. Abe Weinberg would become one of Schultz's top gunmen during the Manhattan Bootleg Wars and was a suspect in the later high-profile gangland killings of Jack "Legs" Diamond, Vincent "Mad Dog" Coll, and mob boss Salvatore Maranzano.

== Background ==
In 1933, Schultz was indicted for tax evasion. Rather than face the charges, Schultz went into hiding and Weinberg assumed control of his criminal operations. When Schultz returned from hiding and won acquittal on the charges against him, he became suspicious of Weinberg, as it was rumored that Weinberg had been secretly negotiating with mob boss Lucky Luciano and Murder, Inc. boss Louis Buchalter to retain control of the Schultz organization.

On April 23, 1935, Bo Weinberg married Anna May Turner. According to the 1930 U.S. Census and the 1925 New York Census she was born in either 1915 or 1916, not in 1912 as stated in the marriage record.

== Disappearance ==
On September 9, 1935, Bo Weinberg left a Midtown Manhattan nightclub and was never seen again. Conflicting reports emerged about the manner of his death. Gangland lore held that Schultz shot him with a .45 automatic in a Midtown hotel room, while Schultz' lawyer Dixie Davis reported witnessing Schultz' bodyguard Lulu Rosenkrantz shoot Weinberg in the back of a car after a night of drinking; Davis later maintained that the shooting could have been accidental. Schultz informed Weinberg's brother George that "We hadda put a kimono on Bo," Schultz' code phrase to indicate that Weinberg's corpse had been encased in cement and dropped into the East River.

== See also ==
- List of people who disappeared

== In popular culture ==
Bo Weinberg would be portrayed in the following films:

- Billy Bathgate, 1991, based on the 1989 historical fiction novel of the same name by E. L. Doctorow; portrayed by Bruce Willis, in which Weinberg is depicted as having his feet encased in cement before being dropped alive into the East River.
- Gangster Wars, 1981, portrayed by Dana Goldstone
- Hit the Dutchman, 1991, portrayed by Matt Servitto
- Hoodlum, 1997, portrayed by Joe Guzaldo
