= Mad Dog Coll (disambiguation) =

Mad Dog Coll (1908–1932) was an Irish-American mob hitman.

Mad Dog Coll may also refer to:

- Mad Dog Coll (1961 film), directed by Burt Balaban
- Mad Dog Coll (1992 film), directed by Greydon Clark
