= Billy Bathgate (film) =

1991 film by Robert Benton

- Original Theatrical Poster
- Directed by: Robert Benton
- Screenplay by: Tom Stoppard
- Based on: Billy Bathgate by E.L. Doctorow
- Produced by: Robert F. Colesbury; Arlene Donovan
- Starring: Dustin Hoffman; Nicole Kidman; Steven Hill; Loren Dean; Bruce Willis
- Cinematography: Néstor Almendros
- Edited by: Alan Heim; David Ray; Robert M. Reitano
- Music by: Mark Isham
- Production company: Touchstone Pictures
- Distributed by: Buena Vista Pictures Distribution
- Release date: November 1, 1991
- Running time: 107 minutes
- Country: United States
- Language: English
- Budget: $48 million
- Box office: $15.5 million

Billy Bathgate is a 1991 American gangster film directed by Robert Benton, starring Loren Dean as the title character and Dustin Hoffman as real-life gangster Dutch Schultz. The film co-stars Nicole Kidman, Steven Hill, Steve Buscemi and Bruce Willis. Although Billy is a fictional character, at least four of the other characters in the film are real people. The screenplay was adapted by British writer Tom Stoppard from E.L. Doctorow's 1989 novel of the same name. Doctorow distanced himself from the film for the extensive deviations from the book. It received negative reviews and was a box-office bomb, only grossing $15.5 million against its $48 million budget.

== Plot ==
Billy Behan is a poor Irish American teenager from the Bronx in 1935. One day, he catches the attention of wealthy Jewish mobster Dutch Schultz. Changing his last name to Bathgate after a local street, Billy goes to work for Schultz's organization, serving mostly as a gofer for Schultz. Billy is present when Schultz personally commits two brutal murders: his trusted lieutenant, Bo Weinberg, who Schultz believes betrayed him after learning that Weinberg was secretly meeting with rival bosses, is dumped in the water wearing cement shoes; and his top enforcer, "Big" Julie Martin, is shot dead by Dutch for stealing $50,000 from the organization's accounts, and defiantly stating that he's "entitled" to it. Despite this, Billy comes to see Schultz as a father figure, and the mob as his chance to make it big.

Facing criminal charges of tax evasion in an upstate New York court, Schultz brings his entourage, including Billy and his mistress Drew Preston (who was previously Bo's mistress), as he temporarily moves into the local community. He successfully charms the residents, presenting himself as good-natured and easygoing while doing many charitable acts, even faking conversion to Catholicism. While Dutch is attending his trial, Billy is assigned to watch Drew. His loyalties to Schultz are tested as he falls in love with the flirtatious Drew. Realizing that Dutch intends to have Drew murdered for cheating on him, Billy is able to get in contact with her real husband, wealthy Harvey, who manages to take Drew home, whisking her out of harm's way on a private plane before Schultz's men can make their move.

Despite being acquitted by a sympathetic jury, Dutch is soon indicted again. After running into difficulties paying for his legal defense, he decides to have state prosecutor Thomas E. Dewey assassinated. This request is denied by the mob's governing authority, the Commission, out of fear that killing Dewey will bring too much heat upon the Mafia. Schultz sends Billy to bribe a member of the Commission, but the bribe is rejected. When Billy returns with the bad news, Schultz angrily blames him for not doing enough, and Billy is fired by Schultz's right-hand man, Otto Berman, who, seemingly foreseeing doom ahead for the out-of-control Schultz, lets him keep the bribe money as a gift. As Billy leaves, he is ambushed and beaten by gangsters working for Commission head Lucky Luciano and is then forced to watch as Luciano's men storm Dutch's safe-haven restaurant where he is dining. Dutch, Berman, and his two henchmen are swiftly gunned down. Billy is taken to meet Luciano, who tells him that he knows where Billy's family lives if he ever speaks of what happened to Dutch, before letting him go, along with his envelope of cash.

== Cast ==
- Dustin Hoffman as Arthur "Dutch Schultz" Flegenheimer
- Nicole Kidman as Drew Preston
- Loren Dean as Billy "Bathgate" Behan
- Bruce Willis as Bo Weinberg
- Steven Hill as Otto Berman
- Stanley Tucci as Charlie "Lucky" Luciano
- Mike Starr as Jules "Big Julie" Martin
- Steve Buscemi as Irving Nitzberg
- John Costelloe as Bernard "Lulu" Rosenkrantz
- Billy Jaye as Mickey Marks
- Timothy Jerome as Dixie Davis
- Stephen Joyce as James Joseph Hines
- Robert F. Colesberry as Jack Kelly
- Frances Conroy as Mary Behan, Billy's Mother
- Moira Kelly as Becky
- Kevin Corrigan as Arnold
- Xander Berkeley as Harvey Preston
- Barry McGovern as Father McInerny
- Terry Loughlin as Mr. Chambers
- Paul Herman as Dutch's Thug
- Jack Mulcahy as Fire Inspector (uncredited)
- Katharine Houghton as Charlotte

== Production ==
The film was shot in Hamlet, North Carolina, and Saratoga Springs, New York.

In a 1993 interview, Steve Buscemi said of the production: "Dustin (Hoffman) liked to rehearse on camera, so we’d end up doing a lot of takes. Before we’d even do the take, we might discuss the scene for a long time. The crew would be waiting around outside and we wouldn’t even be rehearsing the scene, just talking about it."

== Reception ==
=== Critical response ===
On Rotten Tomatoes, the film has an approval rating of 36%, based on 25 reviews. Audiences polled by CinemaScore gave the film an average grade of "C+" on a scale of A+ to F.

Variety wrote, "This refined, intelligent drama about thugs appeals considerably to the head but has little impact in the gut, which is not exactly how it should be with gangster films."

Roger Ebert of the Chicago Sun-Times gave it 2 stars out of 4, and wrote, "Billy Bathgate cost a lot of money to make, they say, but it's not there on the screen."

=== Box office ===
The movie debuted at number 4, and underperformed against its $48 million budget.

=== Accolades ===
Nicole Kidman was nominated for a Golden Globe Award for Best Supporting Actress.
