= David Grose =

American archaeologist

David F. Grose (November 21, 1944 – October 13, 2004) was an American archaeologist and Professor of Classics and Archaeology at the University of Massachusetts Amherst. He was an authority on the classification of early ancient glass from the Roman period.

== Background ==
David Frederick Grose was born in the small farming town of Kenyon, Minnesota. He was the second child of Frederick and Marie Grose. When he was age 6 years, his family moved to Austin, Minnesota. He attended Austin Public Schools were his sixth grade teacher, Janet Dickson, remembered that his favorite subject was ancient Egypt. He attended St. Olaf College in Northfield, Minnesota were his great uncle, Ingebrikt Grose, had been a professor of Language and Religion shortly after its founding. While at St. Olaf College, Grose went on his first excavation to Native American sites in South Dakota. He also successfully competed for a Fulbright Scholarship to study Hadrian's Wall in England after he graduated from St. Olaf College in 1966.

== Education ==
After completing his Fulbright fellowship, Grose attended Harvard University, as a graduate student in the Department of History. He wrote his doctoral thesis on the administration of the city of Rome under the Roman Republic. His advisor was Professor Mason Hammond. Grose wrote a considerable portion of his thesis while at the American Academy in Rome in Rome, Italy. Grose received his doctoral degree from Harvard in 1975. Thereafter, he spent one year at the Museum of Art and Archeology at the University of Missouri, in Columbia, Missouri. While at Missouri, he was strongly influenced by archeologist Gladys Davidson Weinberg (1909 – 2002) to consider the study of ancient glass. Therefore, he spent another year at the Toledo Museum of Glass in Toledo, Ohio.

== Career ==
Subsequently, he accepted a faculty position at the University of Massachusetts Amherst. He continued to pursue his interest in Roman glass and spent many summers at the American Academy of Rome. In 1989, he published his authoritative textbook Early Ancient Glass. This book was quickly accepted as a definitive description of glass production during ancient Rome. Largely due to this accomplishment, Grose was selected for membership in the prestigious Society of Antiquaries of London in 1991.

Later, Grose was chosen to be Chairman of the Department of Classics at the University of Massachusetts Amherst. He also was a consultant to the Metropolitan Museum of Art in New York City, and the British Museum in London.

David Grose died in Cambridge, Massachusetts. His funeral was held in the Chapel of St. Olaf College. He was buried at Gol Lutheran Church cemetery in Kenyon, Minnesota. His great-grandfather Johan Grose, who had emigrated in 1854 from Stettin, Prussia and his great-grandmother, Ingeborg Ness Grose, who had emigrated in 1854 from Sogn, Norway were founding members of this church.

== Awards ==
- Fulbright-Hays Fellowship (1966–1967)
- Rakow Award for Excellence in the History of Glass (1984)

== David F. Grose Memorial ==
The David F. Grose Memorial Fund in Classics was established by the University of Massachusetts Amherst, Department of Classics during the 2003–2004 academic year in order to provide support for our undergraduate students and the programs and scholarships that benefit them.

== Other sources ==
- Grose, David Frederick (1989) Early Ancient Glass: The Toledo Museum of Art (Hudson Hills Press) ISBN 9780933920927
- Grose, David Frederick (R. T. Scott, editor). The Hellenistic, Roman, and Medieval Glass from Cosa. Ann Arbor: University of Michigan Press, 2017. ISBN 978-0-472-13062-7.
