= Billy Bathgate =

1989 novel by E. L. Doctorow

- First edition
- Author: E. L. Doctorow
- Language: English
- Genre: Crime
- Publisher: Random House
- Publication date: 1989
- Publication place: United States
- Media type: Print (hardback & paperback)
- Pages: 323 pp

Billy Bathgate is a 1989 novel by author E. L. Doctorow, telling the story of a young man who ingratiates himself with famous mobster Dutch Schultz. Though the Billy Bathgate character is fiction, Schultz and several others are based on real-life people.

The novel was a critical and popular success. It won the 1989 National Book Critics Circle award for fiction for 1990, the 1990 PEN/Faulkner Award for Fiction, the 1990 William Dean Howells Medal, and was the runner-up for the 1990 Pulitzer Prize and the 1989 National Book Award. The book was dedicated to Jason Epstein.

A film based on the novel was released in 1991 to somewhat mixed reviews.

== Plot summary ==
Billy Behan is an impoverished fifteen-year-old living in The Bronx with his mother. One afternoon, Billy is present when infamous Jewish mobster Dutch Schultz arrives to inspect a shipment of illegal beer. When Billy demonstrates his skill at juggling, an amused Schultz calls him a "capable boy" and tips him. Billy later finds and infiltrates Schultz's offices without being seen, resulting in Schultz's accountant and trusted advisor Otto Berman agreeing to take him into the gang. To avoid the stigma of having an Irish boy work for a Jewish crime boss, Billy changes his last name to "Bathgate" after a local street.

When Berman tasks Billy to spy on the gangsters who go to Schultz's nightclub, Billy witnesses Bo Weinberg, Schultz's lieutenant, meeting with a pair of men affiliated with the rival Italian mafia. Believing that Weinberg is a traitor, Schultz has him and his girlfriend, a socialite named Drew Preston, kidnapped at gunpoint. Billy follows them out to a riverboat, where he witnesses Schultz having Weinberg thrown into the East River with his feet encased in cement. Afterwards, Schultz has Billy take Drew back to her apartment to gather her things. Billy discovers Drew is married, and that her wealthy husband, Harvey, is gay.

Seeing Schultz as simply the latest of her sexual conquests, Drew agrees to become his gun moll and is taken with him when he settles in Onondaga as part of his plan to avoid conviction for tax evasion. Billy poses as Schultz's ward with Drew as his governess, while Schultz works to win over the locals by paying off debts, making charitable gifts, and even converting to Roman Catholicism at the town church. One afternoon, Drew goes for a country hike with Billy and asks him to tell her the truth about Bo's death. She then scrambles down the side of a waterfall and swims in the pool underneath, where Billy comforts her. Eventually, the two start an affair.

On the day of the trial, Berman instructs Billy to take Drew to the horse races at Saratoga Springs. Billy quickly realizes that he's been set up, and that Schultz has arranged for his best hitmen to kill Drew as he fears she will implicate him in Bo's murder. Billy uses the allowance Berman provided him with to have flowers and expensive gifts delivered to Drew, making it impossible for her to be harmed without attracting attention. The ruse buys enough time for Harvey, whom Billy contacted beforehand, to pick up Drew and take her out of the country to safety. Billy, questioned as to why he bought the gifts, lies and says that he bought them on impulse without admitting his relationship with Drew. Schultz is acquitted, but his enemy, federal prosecutor Thomas E. Dewey, issues an arrest order for the mobster if he returns to New York.

Schultz flees to Newark and sets up an office in the back room of a chophouse. Against Berman's advice that going after Dewey would not sit well with the other gangs, Schultz decides to assassinate his enemy and orders Billy to case his apartment block. Just as Billy returns, Mafia gunmen storm the restaurant; Schultz, Berman, and their bodyguards are killed. Billy is small enough to escape out of a bathroom window and returns in time for the dying Berman to give Billy the code to Schultz's personal safe. Billy sneaks into the hospital and transcribes the delirious Schultz's stream of consciousness monologue as he is dying, using clues from this rambling statement to locate the exact spot where Dutch has buried all of his money.

The Mafia tries to intimidate Billy into giving up the money, but he convinces them that only Schultz's lawyer, Dixie Davis, knows where it is. Billy then returns to the Bronx and moves back in with his mother. A year later, Drew, having given birth to Billy's child, gives him sole custody. Using the contents of Schultz's safe, Billy is able to attend college and fight in World War II. After being discharged, he returns to New York and quietly digs up Schultz's fortune, planning to use it to build a new life for himself and his family.

== The novel ==
Billy Bathgate is the eighth in a series of what critic James Wood has called "intricate historical brocades". Earlier novels by Doctorow that were also set in the 1930s include Loon Lake and World's Fair; the latter also shares poetical evocations of the Bronx in which the author himself grew up. Doctorow has described his novel as "a young man's sentimental education in the tribal life of gangsters". A reviewer saw in it "Doctorow’s shapeliest piece of work: a richly detailed report of a 15-year-old boy's journey from childhood to adulthood".

In a radio broadcast, Doctorow described the novel's genesis in a picture, whose origin he could no longer remember, of men in tuxedos and black tie on a tugboat. Trying to interpret that image prompted him to ponder "the culture of gangsterism" and its mythic appeal. The novel leads off with Billy's description of Bo Weinberg's execution (before backtracking to account for how he got there): a performance of which Doctorow explained that "the very first sentence I wrote in Billy Bathgate is the first sentence that appears in the book, and it actually delivered the character Billy to me. He was sort of built into the diction and the syntax, and even the rhythm of the sentence gave me the way he breathed." With this as a start, the novel develops into what is largely a first person monologue, less narration than an act of lyrical remembrance.

In fact, the act of speaking and its interpretation is at the heart of the novel. Through paying close attention to the gangster's death-bed ramblings, Billy finds the clue to locate Schultz's hidden treasure. And as he himself describes, such attention also leads to his equally valuable discovery of the verbal means to preserve as a lasting memory the lesson of what is otherwise a purely destructive force. "Whereas Schultz's rage appropriates everything to his need to destroy, Billy's words bear permanent witness to whatever is threatened with impermanence."

While most reviewers responded to Doctorow's verbal dexterity and reinterpretation of historical facts, they found the ending unconvincingly sentimental. And for one interpreter, at least, the entire plot was grounded in sentimentality, "pure and defiant daydream" based on pulp fiction, its deficiency disguised in a heightened prose that scarcely stops to draw breath and a "vocabulary charged with overkill".
