= Party Girl (1958 film) =

1958 film directed by Nicholas Ray

- Theatrical release poster
- Directed by: Nicholas Ray
- Screenplay by: George Wells
- Story by: Leo Katcher
- Produced by: Joe Pasternak
- Starring: Robert Taylor; Cyd Charisse; Lee J. Cobb
- Cinematography: Robert J. Bronner
- Edited by: John McSweeney Jr.
- Music by: Jeff Alexander
- Color process: Metrocolor
- Production company: Euterpe Productions
- Distributed by: Metro-Goldwyn-Mayer
- Release date: October 28, 1958 (New York City)
- Running time: 99 minutes
- Country: United States
- Language: English
- Budget: $1,758,000
- Box office: $2,380,000

Party Girl is a 1958 American film noir shot in CinemaScope and Metrocolor, directed by Nicholas Ray and starring Robert Taylor, Cyd Charisse, and Lee J. Cobb. It was Charisse's final film and Taylor's next-to-last film for Metro-Goldwyn-Mayer; they were the studio's last remaining major contract stars.

== Plot ==
Slick lawyer Thomas Farrell has made a career of defending Chicago mobsters in court. At a party for mob boss Rico Angelo, he meets chorus girl Vicki Gaye, who accepted $100 to attend the party and another $400 from another gangster, Louis Canetto, from his gambling winnings.

Farrell gives her a ride home, each expressing disapproval at the way the other makes money. Vicki finds her roommate Joy dead by suicide, pregnant by a married criminal. After a long night of questioning by police, Farrell asks that Vicki be given a raise and a featured number on stage at the Golden Rooster club, which Rico owns.

The lawyer and Vicki begin a romance. She's struck by the way Farrell, who is lame, uses his disability to manipulate jurors while getting Canetto off on a murder charge. A surgeon is found who might be able to mend Farrell's hip properly, so he goes to Stockholm for the operation.

A cold-blooded killer, Cookie La Motte, is coming up for trial, but Farrell's frame of mind has changed and he would rather not defend such a man. Rico threatens violence against Vicki if the lawyer doesn't do his job. Cookie jumps bail, tired of the long wait in court, and plans to eliminate prosecuting attorney Stewart. Cookie and his men are gunned down by other racketeers, however, at an Indiana diner.

Stewart decides to pressure the mob by going after anyone connected to it. He begins by placing Farrell under arrest. Canetto goes to Vicki to offer protection but takes her prisoner instead. The district attorney releases Farrell, hoping to smoke out the mobsters who employ him. Canetto, caught in a crossfire, is killed.

Farrell then confronts Rico, but the gangster picks up a bottle of acid with the intention of disfiguring Vicki if the lawyer refuses to do what he says. A fight erupts, with the bottle smashing into Rico's face. Eyes and face burning, he plunges from a window to his death.

== Cast ==
- Robert Taylor as Thomas Farrell
- Cyd Charisse as Vicki Gaye
- Lee J. Cobb as Rico Angelo
- John Ireland as Louis Canetto
- Kent Smith as Jeffrey Stewart
- Claire Kelly as Genevieve Farrell
- Corey Allen as Cookie La Motte
- Lewis Charles as Danny Rimett
- David Opatoshu as Lou Forbes
- Kim Dibbs as Joey Vulner
- Patrick McVey as Detective O'Malley
- Barbara Lang as Ginger D'Amour
- Myrna Hansen as Joy Hampton
- Betty Utey as Cindy Consuelo
- Jack Lambert as Nick (uncredited)
- Aaron Saxon as Frankie Gasto (uncredited)
- Dolores Reed as redhead (uncredited)

Cast notes

- Gloria Wood provided the singing voice of Cyd Charisse.
- Erich von Stroheim, Jr., the son of the noted director, has a bit part as a police lieutenant and was also the assistant director on the film.
- Party Girl was Cyd Charisse's final film for MGM after 14 years at the studio. It was Robert Taylor's penultimate film in his 25 years at the studio, although it was his last to be shot in Hollywood. His final film, The House of the Seven Hawks, was shot in England. Charisse and Taylor were the last two contract stars at MGM.

== Production ==
The song during the opening credits, "Party Girl", was written by Nicholas Brodszky (music) and Sammy Cahn (lyrics) and sung by Tony Martin, who was Cyd Charisse's husband.

Robert Taylor's character, Tom Farrell, is loosely based on Dixie Davis, who was a lawyer for mob boss Dutch Schultz and later became an informant, although film noir historian Eddie Muller claims that Louie Cuttner, a lawyer for Al Capone, was the model. Coincidentally director Nicholas Ray would end up hiring Cuttner some years later, having no idea of the connection. Ray was impressed with the way Taylor worked, comparing him favorably with Method actors—citing Taylor's conferring with an osteologist to gather information on how Tom Farrell's limp could be realistically portrayed.

According to Eddie Muller, Lee J. Cobb's character, Rico Angelo, is a "not too veiled caricature of Al Capone". The scene where Angelo beats up Frankie Gasto – played by uncredited former wrestler Aaron "Lord Spears" Saxon – was based on an incident supposedly involving Capone; it was also used by David Mamet in his screenplay for the 1987 film The Untouchables.

Making Party Girl was not a good experience for Ray. Having had problems with his last two independently produced films, and physically debilitated by the experiences, he signed to direct for MGM in order to get the security of one of the major Hollywood studios and to work again with an earlier collaborator, Charles Schnee; the two had worked together on 1948's They Live by Night, and Schnee was scheduled to be the producer of Party Girl. MGM was interested in Ray because he had grown up and gone to college in Chicago during Prohibition and could recreate the atmosphere of the time and place, which Ray was eager to do. Schnee, however, was replaced by Joe Pasternak, a specialist in musicals, and Ray discovered that he had little input into the writing of the script, which was already finished when he signed on by comedy specialist George Wells.

Ray was barred by MGM's protocols from being involved in the direction of the musical numbers, even to the extent of discussing Charisse's character in relation to them. Ray also wanted to use period music to help recreate the era, but MGM, concerned that it would limit the film's public appeal, rejected that idea. Ray had also planned on three days of location shooting in Chicago, but when the film went past its schedule – partly because of the musicians' strike, partly due to Charisse's long illness – these days were cancelled. In the end Ray had limited input on the film besides personal directorial style. Ray said about the film:

When I couldn't contribute as much as I wanted to the script, I tried to do the next best thing in color and performance, to [capture] the kind of bizarre reality [of the time], which permitted people who lived that life to believe that theirs was the only reality.

Film noir historian Eddie Muller called Ray's use of color in Party Girl "nothing short of dazzling".

=== Musical numbers ===
The musical numbers were choreographed by Robert Sidney, who was forced to rehearse in Mexico with stand-ins because of a musicians' strike, which ultimately caused the studios to disband their in-house orchestras. When Charisse filmed her numbers, she danced to a pre-recorded drum track in one case and to performers who were miming in the other. After the strike was settled, Andre Previn composed the music uncredited. Nicholas Ray was not allowed to direct the musical numbers because MGM's policy was that musical numbers were directed by the choreographer. He was not even allowed to talk to Charisse about her acting during these sequences.

== Box office ==
According to MGM records, the film earned $1,130,000 in the U.S. and Canada and $1,250,000 elsewhere, resulting in a profit of $454,000.

== Critical response ==
At the time of its release, critical response to Party Girl in the United States was generally dismissive, but European critics saw it as confirming their view that director Nicholas Ray was a master of "mise-en-scene".

A. H. Weiler, film critic for The New York Times, gave the film a mixed review: "handsomely accoutered in color and CinemaScope and professionally handled by Nicholas Ray, director, and Joe Pasternak, producer, who approach their subject as if the explosive Chicago of the early Thirties was something they had just discovered. The fact is that Party Girl, like the Charleston, is old hat, an old hat that would be amusing if it weren't so frighteningly reminiscent of a past best forgotten ... There is little that is novel or exciting about this Party Girl, despite her trappings or the occasional gunplay that surrounds her.

TV Guide's review praised the performances: "Party Girl offers only a standard story, but director Ray makes more of it through clever setups and inventive techniques, drawing forth excellent performances from Taylor (who is playing a role loosely based on Dixie Davis, lawyer for mob boss Dutch Schultz of New York, who later turned informant and married a beautiful showgirl). Cobb turns in a "Wild-Man-of-Borneo" performance wherein he not only eats the scenery but spits it out and chews on it again and again. Charisse, who performs two sensuous nightclub dances, does a commendable job with her cliché role."

Film critic Bruce Eder liked the film and wrote, "Party Girl is regarded by many Nicholas Ray fans as the most beautiful looking of all of his films. Shot in CinemaScope and color, and starring Cyd Charisse (with Robert Taylor), it gave cinematographer Robert J. Bronner one of the best showcases he ever had for his work, and was a treat to the eye of the viewer, a veritable explosion of color and motion for many of its best sequences."

Film critic Dennis Schwartz wrote, "Ray does wonders with George Wells' slight script through his masterful use of the camera to evoke the characters' alienation and vulnerability, and by also including exotic dance numbers and diverting costumes he creates some stunning visuals that have an eye-catching surreal look ... It's a honey of a film, never mind the superficial flaws."

The review aggregator Rotten Tomatoes reported that 83% of critics gave the film a positive review, based on twelve reviews.

== Home media ==
This film has been released on DVD in the Warner Archive Collection (individual DVDs).

== Novelization ==
Slightly in advance of the film's release, as was the custom of the era, a paperback novelization of the film was published by Gold Medal Books. The author was renowned crime and western novelist Marvin H. Albert, who also made something of a cottage industry out of movie tie-ins. He seems to have been the most prolific screenplay novelizer of the late '50s through mid-'60s, and, during that time, the preeminent specialist at light comedy.

== See also ==
- List of American films of 1958
