= Weinberg =

Weinberg may refer to:

- Weinberg (surname)
- Weinberg (Winterthur), a quarter of Wülflingen, Winterthur, Switzerland
- Weinberg an der Raab in Styria
- Weinberg Center for the Arts
- Weinberg angle
- Weinberg House (Waren) in Mecklenburg-Vorpommern
- Weinberg (TV series), a 2015 German miniseries

== See also ==
- Mark Wainberg (1945–2017), Canadian scientist
- Vainberg, surname
- Weinberger, surname
- Weinburg, a place in Austria
