= Hoodlum (film) =

- Theatrical release poster
- Directed by: Bill Duke
- Written by: Chris Brancato
- Produced by: Frank Mancuso Jr.
- Starring: Laurence Fishburne; Tim Roth; Vanessa Williams; Cicely Tyson; Chi McBride; Richard Bradford; Clarence Williams III; Andy García
- Cinematography: Frank Tidy
- Edited by: Harry Keramidas
- Music by: Elmer Bernstein
- Production companies: United Artists; Frank Mancuso Jr. Productions
- Distributed by: MGM Distribution Co. (United States); United International Pictures (International)
- Release date: August 27, 1997
- Running time: 130 minutes
- Country: United States
- Language: English
- Budget: $30 million
- Box office: $23,461,013 (US)

Hoodlum is a 1997 American crime drama film that gives a fictionalized account of the gang war between the Italian/Jewish mafia alliance and the black gangsters of Harlem that took place in the late 1920s and early 1930s. The film concentrates on Ellsworth "Bumpy" Johnson (Laurence Fishburne), Dutch Schultz (Tim Roth), and Lucky Luciano (Andy García).

== Plot ==
In 1934, Ellsworth "Bumpy" Johnson is released from Sing Sing and returns to Harlem, where mobster Dutch Schultz asserts his control of the lucrative numbers game. Schultz begrudgingly reports to Mafia boss Charles "Lucky" Luciano, who pays bribes to special prosecutor Thomas E. Dewey to protect his business.

Reuniting with his cousin "Illinois" Gordon, Bumpy returns to the employ of Harlem crime boss Madame Queen, whose business is threatened by Schultz. Bumpy is introduced to Francine, a friend of Illinois' girlfriend Mary. Schultz's meeting with the Queen ends in a standoff when he presents her with a rival's testicles. Walking Francine home from a club, Bumpy charms her with his poetry.

Madame Queen is attacked by Schultz's men, led by black enforcer Bub Hewlett, but Bumpy and fellow mobster Whispers repel the assassins and rescue her. At a meeting of the Commission, Schultz states his determination to take over Harlem. After robbing Schultz's operation with Illinois, Bumpy is chastised by Madame Queen for making his own decisions. Schultz then hires two hitmen, the Salke brothers, to kill Bumpy, and has his police contact, NYPD Captain Foley, arrange for Madame Queen's arrest. At a party, a 17-year-old named Tyrone asks Bumpy for a job, and Francine struggles to reconcile her feelings for Bumpy with his criminal ways.

The Salkes break into Bumpy's home, killing his guards, but Bumpy ambushes them and kills one while a terrified Francine shoots the other dead. Illinois is beaten and robbed by Foley and his officers, while Madame Queen is arrested for illegal gambling. Taking over her operation, Bumpy enlists Tyrone as a runner, and ignores the Queen's orders to avoid violence. By May 1935, he is locked in an all-out war with Schultz. His wealth and power grow, as does the body count, including Tyrone. Bumpy's attempt to comfort Tyrone's mother at his funeral is rejected.

At an ice cream parlor with Francine, Bumpy realizes his banana split has been poisoned. When the shop owner reveals that Bumpy's associate Vallie ordered him to hire the new teenage employee responsible, Bumpy forces the boy to eat the poisoned ice cream despite his attempts to apologize. Whispers then kills Vallie with a razor. Bumpy confronts Schultz at the Cotton Club with Vallie's severed finger, demanding he cease his Harlem operations, but Schultz refuses.

Disguised as truck drivers, Bumpy and Illinois deliver a bomb to one of Schultz's illicit breweries, narrowly escaping before the warehouse explodes. Illinois returns home to find Schultz had Mary killed in retaliation. Threatened by Dewey to end the bloodshed in Harlem, Luciano invites Bumpy and Schultz to a meeting, against both their wills.

Visiting Madame Queen in prison, Bumpy is rebuked for inciting a gang war. Finding she can no longer accept who he is, Francine leaves him, and Illinois drunkenly confronts him over the innocent lives lost. Illinois is abducted and tortured by Foley, to Hewlett's disgust, but refuses to betray his cousin. At Luciano's meeting, Bumpy and Schultz refuse to settle their dispute. After finding Illinois' corpse left as a message, Bumpy slits Foley's throat while he's with a black prostitute, but spares Hewlett's life and offers him a partnership.

Bumpy accepts an alliance with Luciano, and Luciano's driver – on Bumpy's orders – informs Schultz that Bumpy will be meeting with Luciano's accountant. Schultz and his men burst in; when the accountant pleads innocence, Dutch shoots him dead. At a restaurant, Schultz's long-suffering bodyguard Lulu shoots him in the bathroom, and Schultz calmly returns to his table before dying. Meeting Luciano outside for payment, Lulu is shot dead. With Dutch eliminated and the gang war settled, Dewey – having received an enormous bribe from Bumpy, delivered by Hewlett – warns Luciano to stay away from Harlem. Hewlett and Bumpy part ways, and Bumpy arrives at Illinois' funeral. After exchanging looks with Francine and Madame Queen, Bumpy walks out into the rain alone.

== Cast ==
- Laurence Fishburne as Ellsworth "Bumpy" Johnson
- Tim Roth as Dutch Schultz
- Andy Garcia as Charles "Lucky" Luciano
- Vanessa Williams as Francine Hughes
- Cicely Tyson as Stephanie "Madame Queen" St. Clair
- Chi McBride as Illinois Gordon
- Clarence Williams III as "Bub" Hewlett
- Richard Bradford as Captain Jack Foley
- William Atherton as Thomas E. Dewey
- Loretta Devine as "Pigfoot" Mary
- Queen Latifah as Sulie
- Ed O'Ross as Bernard "Lulu" Rosenkrantz
- Eddie Bo Smith Jr. as Tee-Ninchy
- Mike Starr as Albert Salke
- Paul Eckstein as Dutch's Thug
- Beau Starr as Jules Salke
- Paul Benjamin as "Whispers"
- Tony Rich as Duke Ellington

== Production ==
Although set in 1930s Harlem, the film was shot in Chicago.

== Soundtrack ==
A soundtrack containing hip hop and R&B music was released on August 12, 1997, by Interscope Records. It peaked at #94 on the Billboard 200 and #23 on the Top R&B/Hip-Hop Albums.

== Reception ==
The film received mixed reviews from critics. Review aggregation website Rotten Tomatoes gives the film a score of 43% based on 21 reviews. Metacritic, which uses a weighted average, assigned the film a score of 50 out of 100, based on 17 critics, indicating "mixed or average" reviews. Audiences surveyed by CinemaScore gave the film a grade B on scale of A to F.

Critic Roger Ebert noted that "the film is being marketed as a violent action picture, and in a sense, it is" and that director Bill Duke having made "a historical drama as much as a thriller, and his characters reflect a time when Harlem seemed poised on the brink of better things, and the despair of the postwar years was not easily seen on its prosperous streets." It was also criticized for many historical inaccuracies including the claim that Thomas E. Dewey took bribes.

== See also ==
- American Gangster (film)
- Godfather of Harlem: a 2019 Epix television series, starring Forest Whitaker as Ellsworth "Bumpy" Johnson.
