= Constantia Flexibles =

Austrian packaging manufacturer

- Type: GmbH
- Industry: Packaging industry
- Founded: 1912; 114 years ago
- Headquarters: Vienna, Austria
- Key people: David Spratt (CEO); Mariella Röhm-Kottmann (CFO)
- Products: Packaging, Food and Pharma
- Owner: One Rock Capital Partners, LLC; (2024–present)
- Number of employees: 8,500 (2026)
- Website: www.cflex.com

Constantia Flexibles is an Austrian manufacturer of flexible packaging, headquartered in Vienna. Constantia Flexibles employs around 8,500 people, at approximately 37 production sites in 18 countries, predominantly in Europe, North America, Africa and Asia.

The Group supplies its products to multinational corporations and local markets in the food, pet food, pharmaceuticals and beverage industries.

== History ==
Constantia Flexibles was founded in 1912 in Weinburg, Austria, by Constantia Teich. The packaging producer is Haendler & Natermann.

In 1912, the brothers Richard and Ernest Teich founded the company TEICH OHG and started with four employees with the rolling of tin and lead foils. In 1952, Flexo printing was included in the production. In 1969, Herbert Turnauer founded Constantia Industrieverwaltungsgesellschaft m.b.H. to carry out the management of investments in the Turnauer group. In 1970, Herbert Turnauer acquired Teich AG as the main shareholder.

In 2004, the formal merger of the Teich Group and the Haendler & Natermann Group was started. Two years later, in 2006, the umbrella brand was introduced. In 2010, a second rolling mill was put into production. Since 2012, the headquarters of Constantia Flexibles have been located in Vienna, Austria. In October 2015, Constantia Flexibles opened its Competence Center for Research and Development of polymer films and film laminates for flexible packaging. The center is located in Weiden, Germany. In 2017, Constantia Flexibles has been awarded with the EcoVadis Gold medal. The company set a plan to reduce greenhouse gas emissions with the Science Based Target Initiative in 2017. A year later, the company announced plans to reduce Scope 1, 2 and 3 GHG emissions by 24% by 2030 and 49% by 2050 from a 2015 baseline.

In 2018, the company introduced its more sustainable packaging line, Ecolutions. In 2020 and 2022, Constantia Flexibles was awarded leadership by the non-profit Carbon Disclosure Project. In October 2022, the company announced plans to invest €80 million in its plant in Lower Austria. Part of the project is the extension of the rolling mill for the production of aluminum packaging and low-carbon aluminum.

In 2022, the company acquired Propak in Turkey, FFP Packaging Solutions in Great Britain, Drukpol in Poland, and Lászlópack in Hungary. Constantia Flexibles is also part of the joint venture SB-Constantia.

On January 4, 2024, One Rock Capital Partners announced that it had completed the purchase of Constantia Flexibles. In March 2025, Constantia Flexibles acquired the majority of the Aluflexpack AG shares, a European producer of flexible packaging, serving the food and pharmaceutical sector.

== Structure ==
The majority of its sales are made in Europe (73%), America (17%), Middle East, Africa & Australia (8%), and the Asia-Pacific region (2%). The sales split between the divisions is 76% for the consumer and 24% for the pharma market.

Constantia Flexibles has financial investor, One Rock Capital Partners, based in New York City, United States. The management at Constantia Flexibles comprises the management board and the executive committee. The management board includes Chief Executive Officer David Spratt and Chief Financial Officer Mariella Röhm-Kottmann. The executive board has seven additional members.

== Products ==
The company manufactures flexible packaging out of plastic, aluminum and paper. Constantia Flexibles also offers different materials, such as aluminium foil, aluminium, polypropylene (PP) and polyethylene (PE). These are used on their own (mono-structure) or in combination (multi-layer) for food and non-food products, in retail, in industrial applications and in the health sector.

Constantia Flexibles has two main divisions: consumer and pharma. The consumer division offers flexible packaging for food products, home and pet care. It is responsible for 75% of Constantia Flexibles’ sales. The pharma division makes about 25% of sales and produces packages for blisters, containers, flow wraps, and sachets. Some products are with anti-counterfeiting features, child-resistant features or desiccant features.

== Locations ==
Constantia Flexibles is present in 18 countries, with a primary emphasis on the European market. The company's largest manufacturing facility is situated in Weinburg, Austria, which is also the place where the company was originally founded. The company's corporate headquarters are located in Vienna, Austria.
