= Heinberg =

Heinberg is a surname. Notable people with the surname include:

- Allan Heinberg (born 1967), American writer
- Richard Heinberg, American journalist

== See also ==
- Weinberg (surname)
