= George Weinberg =

George Weinberg may refer to:

- George Weinberg (mobster) (1901–1939), New York mobster and brother of Abraham Weinberg
- George Weinberg (psychologist) (1929–2017), American psychologist, author and pro-gay activist
- George Weinberg, drummer for the hip-hop group Raspberry Cordial
