= Joseph Rao =

American mobster

- Born: March 12, 1901; New York City, New York, U.S.
- Died: May 10, 1962 (aged 61)
- Other names: Tough Joey; Joey Rao; Joseph Cangro
- Spouse: Lena Stracci
- Children: 3
- Allegiance: Genovese crime family (after 1935); Dutch Schultz
- Penalty: Burglary (1922; suspended sentence); Extortion (1932; prison); Assaulting a police officer (1936; prison)

Details
- Imprisoned at: Welfare Island Prison, Sing Sing State Prison

Joseph "Tough Joey" Rao (pronounced "Ray-oh"), also known as Joey Rao and Joseph Cangro (March 12, 1901 – May 10, 1962) was a New York mobster who was both a rival and an associate of mobster Dutch Schultz. Rao was involved in drug trafficking, policy banking, and running slot machines in Harlem, New York.

== Biography ==
Joseph Rao was born in New York City on March 12, 1901, to Charles and Francis Rao. Joseph Rao had two brothers, Vincent and Louis Rao. Joseph Rao was married to Lena Stracci; they had a daughter, Francesca, and two sons, Robert and Charles.

When asked his profession, Joseph Rao told people that he was a house painter. Rao stood 5'10"and weighed 190 pounds with brown eyes and black curly hair that he slicked back on his head. His home was in East Harlem.

=== Dutch Schultz gang ===
One of the early members of Schultz's organization, Rao's criminal record dated back to 1920. In 1922, Rao was convicted on burglary charges, but received a suspended sentence.

On July 28, 1931, Rao narrowly survived an assassination attempt. It was a hot day and Rao was sitting outside the Helmar Social Club, which is located on a busy street in Harlem. Bootleggers Vincent "Mad Dog" Coll and Frank Giordano drove up and stopped their car in front of the club. Coll was working for Joseph Rock, an out-of-town bootlegger who was attempting to infringe on Rao's territory. The gunmen opened fire on Rao with machine guns and shotguns. Four young children were wounded and a five-year-old boy, Michael Vengelli, was murdered. Though seriously wounded, Rao survived the attack and escaped the scene.

In February 1932, Rao was convicted of extorting payments from the owner of a Bronx bottling plant and was sentenced to prison. An inmate at the city penitentiary on Welfare Island (now called Roosevelt Island) during the 1930s, Rao and Edward Cleary reportedly controlled contraband and narcotics smuggling in the prison. Having negotiated a deal with the prison warden, Rao and his gang were sleeping on comfortable hospital beds instead of cots in the cells. Rao even kept homing pigeons in the hospital, using them to smuggle in narcotics and send out messages.

On December 26, 1934, Rao went to trial for assaulting a New York City Police Department (NYPD) officer during a fight outside a dance hall in Harlem. In 1936, Rao was convicted and sentenced to two years in Sing Sing state prison.

On October 23, 1935, Dutch Schultz died in a New York hospital after being shot in a Newark, New Jersey bar.

=== Genovese family ===
With the end of Schultz's gang, the Genovese crime family took over Schultz's numbers game racket in Harlem and Rao joined the family. Rao soon became a high-ranking family member, running narcotics in East Harlem.

In 1946, Rao and Michael "Trigger Mike" Coppola were implicated in the murder of Joseph Scottoriggio, a Republican Party election captain. Scottoriggio was beaten to death in lower East Harlem. Rao was later placed under a $40,000 bond and held as a material witness. In November 1950, Rao and his brother-in-law Joseph "Joe Stretch" Stracci were named during a state investigation into corruption and tied to organized crime. District Attorney Frank Hogan charged Rao with attending a meeting with Tammany Hall officials in a campaign to remove Francis X. Mancuso, a former New York General Sessions Court judge from his post as Democratic Party leader of the 16th New York Assembly District.

On May 10, 1962, Joseph Rao died of a stroke at age 61.
