= Weinberger =

Weinberger is a German surname. Notable people with the surname include:

- A. G. Weinberger, Romanian musician
- Alan Weinberger, American businessman
- Alycia J. Weinberger, Carnegie Institution staffer
- Caspar Weinberger (1917–2006), American politician and Secretary of Defense under President Ronald Reagan
- Daniel Weinberger (born 1947), professor
- David Weinberger (born 1950), American technologist and commentator
- Ed. Weinberger (born 1945), American screenwriter
- Eliot Weinberger (born 1949), American writer, editor, and translator
- Franz Weinberger, Swiss bobsledder
- Hans Weinberger (1928–2017), Austrian-American mathematician
- Jacob Weinberger (1882–1974), judge
- Jane Weinberger (1918–2009), American author
- Jaromír Weinberger (1896–1967), Czech composer
- Karlheinz Weinberger (1921–2006), Swiss photographer
- Kimberly Weinberger, American actress
- Mark Weinberger (born 1964/65), American businessman
- Marvin Weinberger (born 1989), Austrian football striker
- Miro Weinberger (born 1970), American politician
- Moshe Weinberger (born 1957), American rabbi
- Peter Weinberger (1956–1956), American infant murdered in a ransom kidnapping
- Peter J. Weinberger (born 1942), mathematician and computer scientist
- Richard Weinberger (born 1990), Canadian long-distance swimmer
- Sharon Weinberger, American journalist
- Shmuel Weinberger (born 1963), mathematician
- Zanvil Weinberger (born 1995), Israeli Hasidic singer

== See also ==
- Weinberger Doctrine
- Jacob Weinberger United States Courthouse
- Weinberg (disambiguation)
- Vainberg
