= Mad Dog (comics) =

Mad Dog, in comics, may refer to:

- Mad Dog (DC Comics), a DC Comics supervillain
- Mad Dog, a number of Marvel Comics characters:
  - Mad Dog (Marvel Comics), a Marvel/Timely Comics supervillain
  - Mad Dog Rassitano, a Marvel Comics character and fictional SWAT member
  - Mad Dog #336, an alias used by Peter Parker
  - Mad Dog #736, an alias used by Captain Zero
  - Mad Dog #2020, an alias used by Brainstorm
  - "Mad Dog" Martin, a character who appeared in Combat Kelly and his Deadly Dozen
  - "Mad Dog", a Marvel comics title based on the fictional comic of the same name in the sitcom Bob.

== See also ==
- Mad Dog (disambiguation)
