= Mad Dogs =

Mad Dogs may refer to:

== Entertainment ==
- Mad Dogs (novel), a 2007 crime novel by Robert Muchamore
- Mad Dogs (British TV series), a 2011 psychological thriller
- Mad Dogs (American TV series), a partial remake of the British series

== Sports ==
- The Mad Dogs, a Japanese wrestling team
- Madison Mad Dogs, an indoor football team from Madison, Wisconsin
- Massachusetts Mad Dogs, an American independent baseball team from Lynn, Massachusetts
- Memphis Mad Dogs, a short-lived Canadian Football League team in Memphis, Tennessee

== See also ==
- Mad Dog (disambiguation)
- Rabid Dogs, a film
