= Otto Berman =

American accountant

Otto Biederman, known as Otto "Abbadabba" Berman (August 10, 1891 – October 24, 1935) was an accountant for American organized crime. He is known for having coined the phrase "Nothing personal, it's just business."

== Biography ==
=== Early life ===
Berman was born in a Jewish family in New York City. At age fifteen, he was arrested and tried for attempted rape but was found not guilty. He later became an accountant, well known for his ability to figure complex mathematical equations and algebraic expressions in a matter of seconds, without the use of paper or pen. He met and befriended writer Damon Runyon. Runyon based his recurring character Regret on Berman, portrayed by character actor Lynne Overman in the movie version of Runyon's story, Little Miss Marker.

=== 1930s ===
In the 1930s Berman became the accountant for, and advisor to, gangster Dutch Schultz. Berman was the handicapper for Cincinnati's Coney Island track in 1935, prior to his death. A Coney Island badge was located in his pocket. Locals identified him with the nickname "Abba Dabba".

=== Death ===
On October 23, 1935, Berman was having a meeting at the Palace Chophouse tavern in Newark, New Jersey, with Schultz and gunmen Abe Landau and Bernard "Lulu" Rosenkrantz when assassins hired by Lucky Luciano burst into the room. Berman was hit by several bullets as well as buckshot from a 12-gauge shotgun. He was the first of the four men to die, at 2:20 the next morning.

A photo of his bullet-riddled body appeared alongside a photo of Schultz undergoing surgery in the next morning's newspaper, under the headline, "Schultz, Five Pals Shot". In fact, only four others were shot: Berman, Landau, Rosenkrantz, and Marty Krompier, one of Schultz's lieutenants. The accompanying article claimed that Berman was a gunman for Schultz. An angry Damon Runyon quickly submitted an editorial to the newspaper, defending Berman.

Berman is buried next to his parents in Mount Carmel Cemetery in Glendale, Queens.

== In popular culture ==
In the novel Billy Bathgate, Berman appears as the mentor to the main character.

Berman is played by Allen Garfield in The Cotton Club and by Steven Hill in Billy Bathgate.

In the second episode of the third season of The Wire, a police officer calls another officer "Abbadabba Berman" as a joke.
