= The Cotton Club (film) =

- Theatrical release poster
- Directed by: Francis Ford Coppola
- Screenplay by: William Kennedy; Francis Ford Coppola
- Story by: William Kennedy; Francis Ford Coppola; Mario Puzo
- Based on: The Cotton Club by James Haskins
- Produced by: Robert Evans
- Starring: Richard Gere; Gregory Hines; Diane Lane; Lonette McKee; Bob Hoskins; James Remar; Nicolas Cage; Allen Garfield; Fred Gwynne
- Cinematography: Stephen Goldblatt
- Edited by: Barry Malkin; Robert Q. Lovett
- Music by: John Barry
- Production companies: Totally Independent Productions; American Zoetrope; Producers Sales Organization
- Distributed by: Orion Pictures
- Release date: December 14, 1984
- Running time: 128 minutes; 139 minutes (directors cut)
- Country: United States
- Language: English
- Budget: $58 million
- Box office: $25.9 million

The Cotton Club is a 1984 American musical crime drama film co-written and directed by Francis Ford Coppola and based on James Haskins' 1977 book of the same name. The story centers on the Cotton Club, a 1930s Harlem jazz club. The film stars Richard Gere, Gregory Hines, Diane Lane, and Lonette McKee, with Bob Hoskins, James Remar, Nicolas Cage, Allen Garfield, Gwen Verdon, Fred Gwynne and Laurence Fishburne in supporting roles.

The Cotton Club was released by Orion Pictures on December 14, 1984. The film was noted for going over budget on its production costs and taking a total of five years to complete. Despite being a disappointment at the box-office, the film received generally positive reviews and was nominated for several awards, including Golden Globe Awards for Best Director and Best Picture (Drama) and Academy Awards for Best Art Direction and Best Film Editing. The film has become a cult favorite to fans of the musical genre.

== Plot ==
A musician named Dixie Dwyer begins working with mobsters to advance his career but falls in love with Vera Cicero, the girlfriend of gangland kingpin Dutch Schultz. Sandman Williams, a dancer from Dixie's neighborhood, and his brother Clay are hired by the Cotton Club, a jazz club where most of the performers are black and the customers are white. Owney Madden, a mobster, owns the club and runs it with his right-hand man, Frenchy Demange.

Dixie becomes a Hollywood film star, thanks to the help of Madden and the mob but angering Schultz. He also continues to see Schultz's gun moll, Vera Cicero, whose new nightclub has been financed by the jealous gangster. In the meantime, Dixie's ambitious younger brother Vincent becomes a gangster in Schultz's mob and eventually a public enemy, holding Frenchy as a hostage.

Sandman alienates Clay at the Cotton Club by agreeing to perform a solo number there. While the club's management interferes with Sandman's romantic interest in Lila Rose Oliver, a singer, its cruel treatment of the performers leads to an intervention by Harlem criminal "Bumpy" Rhodes on their behalf. Schultz is violently dealt with by Madden's men while Dixie and Sandman perform on the Cotton Club's stage.

== Cast ==
- Richard Gere as Michael "Dixie" Dwyer
- Gregory Hines as Delbert "Sandman" Williams
- Diane Lane as Vera Cicero
- Lonette McKee as Lila Rose Oliver
- Bob Hoskins as Owney Madden
- James Remar as Dutch Schultz
- Nicolas Cage as Vincent Dwyer
- Allen Garfield as Otto Berman
- Fred Gwynne as Frenchy Demange
- Gwen Verdon as Tish Dwyer
- Lisa Jane Persky as Frances Flegenheimer
- Maurice Hines as Clayton "Clay" Williams
- Julian Beck as Sol Weinstein
- Joe Dallesandro as Charles "Lucky" Luciano
- Larry Fishburne as Bumpy Rhodes
- Tom Waits as Irving Starck
- John P. Ryan as Joe Flynn
- Glenn Withrow as Ed Popke
- Bruce MacVittie as Vince Hood
- Jennifer Grey as Patsy Dwyer
- Woody Strode as Holmes
- Diane Venora as Gloria Swanson
- Tucker Smallwood as Kid Griffin
- Bill Cobbs as Big Joe Ison
- Rosalind Harris as Fanny Brice
- Mark Margolis as Charlie Workman
- Larry Marshall as Cab Calloway
- Rony Clanton as Casper Holstein
- Gregory Rozakis as Charlie Chaplin

== Production ==
Inspired to make The Cotton Club by a picture-book history of the nightclub by James Haskins, Robert Evans was the film's original producer. Evans hoped the film would bring public attention to African-American history in a similar way that Gone with the Wind did for the American Civil War and the Reconstruction era. On December 12, 1980, it was announced that Evans and Paramount Pictures would serve as co-producers of the film while Robert Altman would direct and Mario Puzo would write. However, Evans and Altman's film Popeye premiering that day became a box-office flop. Although Evans secured $12 million worth of financing from Saudi business tycoon Adnan Khashoggi, Paramount Pictures withdrew from the film in 1981. Evans worked to secure sole ownership of the film negative to recoup his losses from recent poor stock-market investments and a cocaine trafficking arrest. However, this action alienated potential investors who would be unable to profit from television and home video distribution rights. The production was finally delayed when Evans reached a plea bargain to produce an advertising campaign of anti-drug public service announcements in exchange for an expungement of his record.

In 1984, Evans, who intended to direct the film himself after Altman departed, hired William Kennedy and Francis Ford Coppola to re-write Puzo's story and screenplay. Evans eventually decided that he did not want to direct the film and asked Coppola at the last minute. Evans and Coppola had an adversarial relationship from the production of the Godfather films but Coppola accepted the jobs as screenwriter and then director because he needed the money – he was deeply in debt from making One from the Heart with his own money and his studio Zoetrope Studios went bankrupt. Richard Sylbert said that he told Evans not to hire Coppola because "he resents being in the commercial, narrative, Hollywood movie business". Coppola said that he had letters from Sylbert asking him to work on the film because Evans was crazy. Coppola also said that "Evans set the tone for the level of extravagance long before I got there".

By the time Evans decided not to direct and brought in Coppola, at least $13 million had already been committed. Las Vegas casino owners Edward and Fred Doumani, along with businessman Victor L. Sayyah, put $30 million into the film in exchange for a fifty-percent ownership stake in the film. Evans received further loans by mortgaging his mansion in Beverly Hills and stock in Gulf + Western as collateral. Other financial backers included Arab arms dealer Adnan Khashoggi and vaudeville promoter Roy Radin, who was murdered in May 1983. The killers later alleged that they had been hired by Evans and Radin's girlfriend Karen Greenberger, a drug dealer who felt she was cut out of profits from the film. In the 1989 "Cotton Club Trial", Evans invoked his Fifth Amendment right against self-incrimination and refused to testify.

According to William Kennedy in an interview with Vanity Fair, the budget of the film was $47 million. However, Coppola told the head of Gaumont, Europe's largest distribution and production company, that he thought the film might cost $65 million.

Evans cast Al Pacino, Sylvester Stallone, and Harrison Ford to portray Michael "Dixie" Dwyer before Gere was hired. Richard Pryor was considered for the role of Delbert "Sandman" Williams. Robert Evans wanted to cast his friend Alain Delon in a two-scene role as Lucky Luciano but this did not occur. The role of Luciano was instead portrayed by Joe Dallesandro, starting the dramatic film career for the former Warhol Superstar.

Author Mario Puzo was the original screenwriter and was eventually replaced by William Kennedy, who wrote a rehearsal script in eight days which the cast used for three weeks prior to shooting. According to actor Gregory Hines, a three-hour film was shot during rehearsals. From July 15 to August 22, 1983, twelve scripts were produced, including five during one 48-hour non-stop weekend. Kennedy estimates that between 30 and 40 scripts were turned out. Production began on August 22, 1983, at Kaufman Astoria Studios in Queens. Over 600 people built sets, created costumes and arranged music at a reported $250,000 a day. During the production many crew members were abruptly fired. Within several weeks the film was already over budget, allowing Evans to deduct from the $4 million salary of Coppola, who had not yet been fully paid because the script was still being rewritten and thus incomplete. Coppola reacted by walking off set and refusing to continue directing the film until he was fully paid.

As costs on the film continued to rise, the Doumani brothers convinced Orion Pictures to advance costs for the film on the condition that Evans step down as producer and hired mobster Joseph Cusamano to intimidate Evans into giving up his share of the partnership. Evans initially agreed but stopped them by filing a restraining order against them after learning Sayyah was not involved in the deal. On June 7, 1984, Sayyah filed a lawsuit against the Doumani brothers, their lawyer David Hurwitz, Evans and Orion Pictures for fraud and breach of contract. Sayyah invested $5 million and said that he had little chance of recouping his money because the budget escalated from $25 to $58 million. He accused the Doumanis of forcing out Evans and said that an Orion loan to the film of $15 million unnecessarily increased the budget. Evans, in turn, sued Edward Doumani to keep from acting as general partner on the film. The court ruled in favor of Evans but also gave Coppola's close associate Barrie M. Osborne full control over post-production, essentially barring Evans from the completion of the film. Sayyah and the Doumani brothers would also be uncredited as producers.

== Music ==
The soundtrack for the film was written by John Barry. It released on December 14, 1984, via Geffen Records. The album won the Grammy Award for Best Jazz Instrumental Performance, Big Band at the 28th Annual Grammy Awards in 1986.

== Release ==
=== Home media ===
Embassy Home Entertainment paid a record $4.7 million for North America home video rights. The film appeared on videotape and videodisc in April 1985. It was the first to use the Macrovision copy protection system on VHS.

=== Director's cut ===
In 2015, Coppola found an old Betamax video copy of his original cut that ran 25 minutes longer. When originally editing the picture, he acquiesced to distributors who wanted a shorter film with a different structure. Between 2015 and 2017, Coppola spent over $500,000 of his own money to restore the film to the original cut. This version, titled The Cotton Club: Encore and running 139 minutes, debuted at the 44th Telluride Film Festival on September 1, 2017. Lionsgate (owner of the Zoetrope Corporation backlog, and working in association with original studio Orion Pictures) released that version theatrically, and on DVD and Blu-ray in the fall of 2019.

The Film Stage gave The Cotton Club: Encore a rating of A−, while Rolling Stone described the result of this version as "eye-opening". Filmink argued the recut "is interesting, but it fixes none of the movie’s problems and makes some things worse."

== Reception ==
=== Box office ===
The Cotton Club premiered on December 2, 1984 at the Palace Theatre in Albany, New York. (NY Times article, December 2, 1984, Section 1, Page 46). It was released on December 14, 1984, in the United States and Canada on 808 screens and grossed $2.9 million on its opening weekend, fifth place behind Beverly Hills Cop, Dune, City Heat and 2010: The Year We Make Contact. Evans took the blame for hiring Coppola while Coppola responded that if he had not been hired, the film would have never been made. Evans said that Coppola made the budget escalate dramatically by rejecting the script, hiring his own crew, and falling behind schedule. The film was a commercial failure, grossing just under $26 million against a $58 million budget. After the film's release stock traders began selling Orion Pictures shares with the expectation that the studio would suffer financially.

=== Critical response ===
On Rotten Tomatoes, the film has a 76% rating based on 33 reviews. The site's consensus states: "Energetic and brimming with memorable performers, The Cotton Club entertains with its visual and musical pizazz even as its plot only garners polite applause." On Metacritic, the film has a weighted average score of 68% based on reviews from 14 critics.

Roger Ebert of the Chicago Sun-Times rated the film 4 out of 4 stars. The film appeared on both Siskel and Ebert's best of 1984.

The film was nominated for the Academy Award for Best Art Direction (Sylbert, George Gaines and Leslie Bloom) and the Academy Award for Best Film Editing (Barry Malkin and Robert Q. Lovett) at the 57th Academy Awards. The film was also nominated for the Golden Globe Award for Best Motion Picture – Drama and the Golden Globe Award for Best Director (Coppola) at the 42nd Golden Globe Awards. The film won the BAFTA Award for Best Costume Design (Milena Canonero) and was nominated for the BAFTA Award for Best Sound (Edward Beyer, Jack C. Jacobsen and David Carroll) at the 39th British Academy Film Awards.

The film was also nominated for the Japan Academy Film Prize for Outstanding Foreign Language Film and the Golden Reel Award for Outstanding Achievement in Sound Editing – Sound Effects and Foley for Feature Film (Maurice Schell). Diane Lane was nominated for the Golden Raspberry Award for Worst Supporting Actress for this film and Streets of Fire at the 5th Golden Raspberry Awards.
