= Mad Dog Coll (1992 film) =

- Directed by: Greydon Clark; Ken Stein
- Written by: Neil Ruttenberg
- Produced by: Menahem Golan
- Starring: Christopher Bradley
- Cinematography: Janusz Kamiński
- Edited by: Patrick Rand
- Music by: Terry Plumeri
- Production company: 21st Century Film Corporation
- Distributed by: Vidmark (Home Video)
- Release dates: 1992; 1993 (Home Video)
- Running time: 101 minutes
- Country: United States
- Language: English

Mad Dog Coll is a 1992 American drama film directed by Greydon Clark. It stars Christopher Bradley and Bruce Noizick. It was released in the United States on home video as Killer Instinct.

== Plot ==
Vincent Coll starts off as a New York street-fighter, and moves quickly all the way up to being a criminal kingpin in the mafia, and engages in a turf war with fellow mobster, Dutch Schultz.

== Cast ==
- Christopher Bradley as Vincent "Mad Dog" Coll
- Jeff Griggs as Peter Coll
- Bruce Noizick as Dutch Schultz
- Rachel York as Lotte
- Eddie Bowz as Joey Noe
- Jack Conley as Owen "Owney The Killer" Madden
- Guy D'Alema as Mr. Gotti
- Anna Garduno as Rosie
- Matt Servitto as Charlie "Lucky" Luciano
- Andrey Podoshian as Barelli

== Reception ==
TV Guide described the film as a "predictable but energetic gangster film."

== See also ==
- Mad Dog Coll (1961 film)
