= Lillian Harris Dean =

African American cook and entrepreneur

- Born: 1870; Mississippi Delta, United States
- Died: 1929 (aged 58–59); California, United States
- Culinary career
- Cooking style: Soul food

Lillian Harris Dean (1870 – 1929) was an African-American cook and entrepreneur who became a minor national celebrity in the 1920s for bringing the cuisine of Harlem, New York City, to national attention.

== Early life and career ==
Dean was born in the Mississippi Delta in 1870. She migrated to New York and became a highly successful entrepreneur who catered to the culinary tastes of other displaced African-American Southerners living in Harlem. She took the name Pig Foot Mary because she turned marketing traditional foods such as pigs' feet, hog maws, chitterlings (chitlins), and other foods into a thriving business. Though she did not attain the fame or millionaire status of Madam C. J. Walker, Dean was an early example of African-American entrepreneurial success in the post-Civil War era.

Dean began by selling food in 1901 on 60th Street sidewalk out of a makeshift cart — actually, a re-purposed baby carriage — at the corner of West 135th Street (what is now Malcolm X Boulevard). Her wares included chitterlings, hogmaws, and pig's feet as well as corn. In time, she was able to afford a steam table booth, which she attached to the corner newsstand — and she married the newsstand owner, John Dean. Her biography is summed up in these two paragraphs by prominent African-American journalist Roi Ottley, writing in 1943:

... [Most Negroes] earned money the hard way. there was, for instance, Pig Foot Mary, huge and deep-voiced, who had trailed her migrant customers to Harlem Early in the fall of 1901, she drifted into New York from the Mississippi Delta penniless, and within a week after her arrival set up a business in front of a popular San Juan Hill saloon. Mary, whose real name was Lillian Harris, after earning five dollars as a domestic, spent three for a dilapidated baby carriage and a large wash-boiler, and invested the balance in pigs' feet. Hot pigs' feet showed an immediate profit. From early morning until late at night, swathed in starched checked gingham, she remained at this stand for sixteen years. Beyond two cotton dresses, her worldly goods were a mounting bank account. Mary was saving enough money, she often said, to purchase a place for herself in an old folks' home for respectable colored people. Concern about her old age vanished when she moved to Harlem, opened her business at 135th Street on Lenox Avenue, and three weeks later married John Dean, owner of an adjoining newsstand.

She is described by James Weldon Johnson in his 1925 magazine article "The Making of Harlem":

"Pig Foot Mary" is a character in Harlem. Everybody who knows the corner of Lenox Avenue and One Hundred and Thirty-fifth Street knows "Mary" and her stand and has been tempted by the smell of her pigsfeet [sic] fried chicken and hot corn, even if he has not been a customer. "Mary," whose real name is Mrs. Mary Dean, bought the five-story apartment house at the corner of Seventh Avenue and One Hundred and Thirty-seventh Street at a price of $42,000. Later she sold it to the Y.W.C.A. for dormitory purposes.

In 1908 she married John Dean, a postal worker and newsstand owner.

Johnson provided a slightly different version in 1930's "Black Manhattan":

There was Mrs. Mary Dean, known as "Pig Foot Mary" because of her high reputation in the business of preparing and selling that particular delicacy, so popular in Harlem. She paid $42,000 for a five-story apartment house at the corner of Seventh Avenue and One Hundred and Thirty-seventh Street, which was sold later to a coloured [sic] undertaker for $72,000. ... [T]hese figures are amazing. Twenty years ago barely a half-dozen coloured individuals owned land on Manhattan.

== Later life ==
As Johnson notes, Dean invested her food stand profits in real estate and attained a considerable fortune, "several hundred thousand dollars" according to landmark information from the City of New York's Department of Planning. Ottley provides further detail, stating that John Dean encouraged his wife to invest:

He persuaded her to purchase a $44,000 apartment-house building, which she sold six years later to a Negro "underground specialist" (undertaker) for $72,000. Though unable to read or write, Pig Foot Mary became one of the community's shrewdest businesswomen. Her subsequent dealings in real estate brought her bank account up to $375,000 -- an ample sum for old-age security. [parenthetical in original]

Ottley was enumerating these sums in 1917 dollars (the building purchase), 1923 dollars (the sale), and 1943 dollars (her eventual fortune). Adjusted for inflation, these sums record a large history of accomplishment for a woman who arrived in New York City at the turn of the 20th century, alone, illiterate and completely impoverished.

Lillian Harris Dean retired to California and died in 1929.

Loretta Devine portrays a highly fictionalized version of Dean in the 1997 movie Hoodlum; she is a gangster's girlfriend who is murdered by her lover's enemies. Her story was memorialized in a Daniel Carlton play Pigfoot Mary Says Goodbye to the Harlem Renaissance.

== See also ==
- Harlem
- Soul food
