= Mad Dogs and Englishmen =

Mad Dogs and Englishmen may refer to:

- "Mad Dogs and Englishmen" (song), a 1931 song by Noël Coward
- "Mad Dogs and Englishmen" (song), a 1970 song recorded by Stone the Crows
- Mad Dogs & Englishmen (album), a 1970 live album by Joe Cocker
- Mad Dogs & Englishmen (film), a 1971 Joe Cocker music film
- Mad Dogs and Englishmen (film), a 1995 Canadian/British film
- Mad Dogs and Englishmen (novel), a 2002 Doctor Who novel
- "Mad Dogs and Englishmen", a song by Late of the Pier from the 2008 album Fantasy Black Channel

== See also ==
- "Ballad of Mad Dogs and Englishmen", a single by Leon Russell from the 1971 music film and included in the album Leon Russell and the Shelter People
