= Mad Dog Coll (1961 film) =

- Directed by: Burt Balaban
- Written by: Leo Lieberman; Edward Schreiber
- Produced by: Edward Schreiber
- Starring: John Davis Chandler; Kay Doubleday; Brooke Hayward; Neil Nephew; Jerry Orbach; Vincent Gardenia; Telly Savalas
- Cinematography: Gayne Rescher
- Edited by: Ralph Rosenblum
- Music by: Stu Phillips
- Distributed by: Columbia Pictures
- Release date: May 12, 1961
- Running time: 88 minutes
- Country: United States
- Language: English

Mad Dog Coll is a 1961 biographical film directed by Burt Balaban. It was the film debut role of Telly Savalas and Gene Hackman.

== Plot ==
The film is a heavily fictionalized treatment of the life of Vincent "Mad Dog" Coll, who was born in 1908 in County Donegal, Ireland. In the film, Coll is depicted as growing up with an abusive father who beats and ridicules him (the film opens with him machine-gunning his father's gravestone), and started a street gang at a very young age, which led in turn to organized crime. He is portrayed as a psychopath, incapable of fear or compassion, who is never more happy than when he is recklessly shooting people with his tommy gun or feuding with the fellow mobster Dutch Schultz over whisky hijacking. The film ends with Coll being shot down by the police after Schultz puts a contract on him, but in fact he was arrested, tried, released, then later killed by associates of Lucky Luciano because he was making too much trouble for the syndicate. The incident where he allegedly was involved in the accidental shooting of a five-year-old boy (which led to his nickname in the press) is incorrectly associated with him shooting his way out of an attempt on his life (two boys hanging around the docks are killed), when in fact it happened as a result of a kidnapping he was accused of being part of. Dutch Schultz is depicted by Vincent Gardenia, who was 15 years older than Chandler—Coll was only seven years younger than Schultz.

== Cast ==
- John Davis Chandler as Mad Dog Coll
- Kay Doubleday as Clio
- Brooke Hayward as Elizabeth
- Joy Harmon as Caroline
- Neil Nephew as Rocco
- Jerry Orbach as Joe Clegg
- Vincent Gardenia as Dutch Schultz
- Telly Savalas as Lt. Darro
- Glenn Cannon as Harry
- Gene Hackman as Policeman (uncredited)

== Production ==
Brooke Hayward was cast in October 1960.

The film was distributed by Columbia.

== Novelization ==
In June 1961, Monarch Books released a paperback novelization of the screenplay, by Frank Castle, writing under the pseudonym Steve Thurman. The cover featured a black-and-white still of the movie and an associate standing over the bedroom "rub-out" of a bullet-ridden married couple.

== Reception ==
The New York Times wrote that the film "belongs back in the pound."

== See also ==
- Mad Dog Coll, 1992 film
