= Mad Dog Knives =

Custom knife-making facility

- Industry: Manufacturing
- Founded: Bear Valley Springs, CA; 1988; 38 years ago
- Headquarters: Prescott Valley, Arizona
- Key people: Kevin McClung
- Products: Knives
- Revenue: N/A
- Number of employees: N/A

Mad Dog Knives is a custom knifemaking facility headed by Kevin McClung, a former Senior Materials Scientist at the American Rocket Company, Mad Dog Knives is based in Prescott, Arizona. Mad Dog Knives made the fixed-blade knife known as the ATAK, used by Naval Special Warfare Groups 1 and 2 after the "SEAL Trials" of 1992. Mad Dog Knives are typically made from selectively tempered, hand ground O1 Tool Steel with a hardchrome plating to protect the blade.

== Materials and design ==
Mad Dog Knives makes tactical fixed-blade knives, originally using Starrett 496-O1 high carbon tool steel and later switching to Precision Marshall Presco American Made 01, which is given a proprietary heat treatment. This process includes hardening, stress relieving, and selectively tempering the blade. As a result, the blades have an edge hardness of 62-63 on the Rockwell C scale whereas the tip, spine, and tang have a Rockwell hardness of 50-54. This heat treatment was devised to develop phenomenal edge retention while preventing tip breakage and maintaining a degree of flexibility on the softer spine to improve the toughness of the knife. The blades are coated with a layer of hard chrome as a method of abrasion and corrosion resistance.

Mad Dog Knives utilizes a proprietary glass/epoxy composite material for the handle material of its knives. This material can withstand long term heat in excess of 149 degrees Celsius (300 degrees Fahrenheit), a tractive force of 79,000 psi, current of 1,000 volts per mil (0.001") of thickness and is impervious to salt water, diesel oil, benzine and other caustic/corrosive fluids. Mad Dog Knives utilizes Kydex 100 ® as a sheath material.

Mad Dog Knives has made ceramic MIRAGE X blades and blades from other non-metallic materials for EOD and other military usage. These knives are not available for sale to the general public.

== Military models ==
Mad Dog Knives won the 1992 "SEAL Trials" to supply Naval Special Warfare Groups 1 and 2 with a fixed blade knife. This knife is the ATAK (Advanced Tactical Assault Knife) and Mad Dog Knives received a U.S. Navy Sole Source Justification for its manufacture. The ATAK is the only knife in US Military history justified as such.

== In the media ==
Mad Dog Knives have been described as weapons in Richard Marcinko's Rogue Warrior novels and were props in Steven Seagal's movie Under Siege 2: Dark Territory. One of the knives used in the movie was later sold at a Safari Club International fund raiser for $10,000.
