= Binyamin Weinberg =

Israeli footballer

Binyamin Weinberg בנימין ויינברג
Personal information
- Position: Goalkeeper

Senior career*
Years	Team	Apps	(Gls)
	Maccabi Sha'arayim	-	(-)
1972–1974	Maccabi Haifa	55	(0)
1974–1982	Hapoel Haifa	-	(-)
1982–1984	Bnei Yehuda Tel Aviv F.C.	-	(-)
1984	Maccabi Haifa	0	(0)
- * Club domestic league appearances and goals

Binyamin Weinberg (Hebrew: בנימין ויינברג) is a former Israeli professional football (soccer) player.

== Biography ==
After having disputes with management at boyhood club, Maccabi Sha'arayim, he had two offers from other clubs. After turning down Beitar Jerusalem, he joined Maccabi Haifa where he enjoyed limited success. During his time at Haifa, the Yom Kippur War broke out and Weinberg was called up for reserve duty to the Israeli Armor Corps, in the Sinai Peninsula. When on the offensive of an Egyptian military outpost, his Centurion tank shook. It was hit by an anti-tank guided missile, killing the tank driver, about three kilometers into Egyptian territory and hours away from the Suez Canal. The tank commander ordered the remaining soldiers out of the tank before it would catch fire and blow up. The injured soldiers, Weinberg among them, hid for an entire day in a water tower until the Paratroopers Brigade rescued them.

Word broke out around Israel that an Israeli goalkeeper from the top flight was severely injured during the war and censors prevented Weinberg's name from being released. Football fans in Israel held a lottery trying to guess which goalkeeper had been injured. After two surgeries and a recovery period in Ashkelon, Weinberg returned to practice with Haifa and eventually took back the starting position from Yosef Hedni. In the beginning of the 1974-75 season, Weinberg was transferred to city rivals Hapoel for a sum of IL50,000 and the proceeds from a friendly between the two clubs.

After eight season at Hapoel Haifa, and a short stint with Bnei Yehuda, Maccabi Haifa signed Weinberg to serve as the back up for Avi Ran. That year, Haifa won the league without Weinberg seeing any match time and he subsequently retired from football after the season.

Weinberg is Married to Yafa (née Popovski) and has a son, Ori Weinberg and a daughter, Dana Guri (Weinberg).
