= Mad Dog Coll =

American mobster (Uinseann Ó Colla or Vincent Coll, 1908–1932)

- Mugshot of Coll
- Born: Uinseann Ó Colla; July 20, 1908; Gweedore, County Donegal, Ireland
- Died: February 8, 1932 (aged 23); Manhattan, New York City, U.S.
- Resting place: Saint Raymond's Cemetery, Bronx
- Other names: "Mad Dog", "Mad Mick"
- Occupations: Mobster, hitman, kidnapper, bootlegger
- Known for: Hitman for Dutch Schultz and Prohibition-era gang leader

Vincent "Mad Dog" Coll (born Uinseann Ó Colla, July 20, 1908 – February 8, 1932) was an Irish-American mob hitman in the 1920s and early 1930s in New York City. Coll gained notoriety for the alleged accidental killing of a young child during a mob kidnap attempt.

== Early years ==
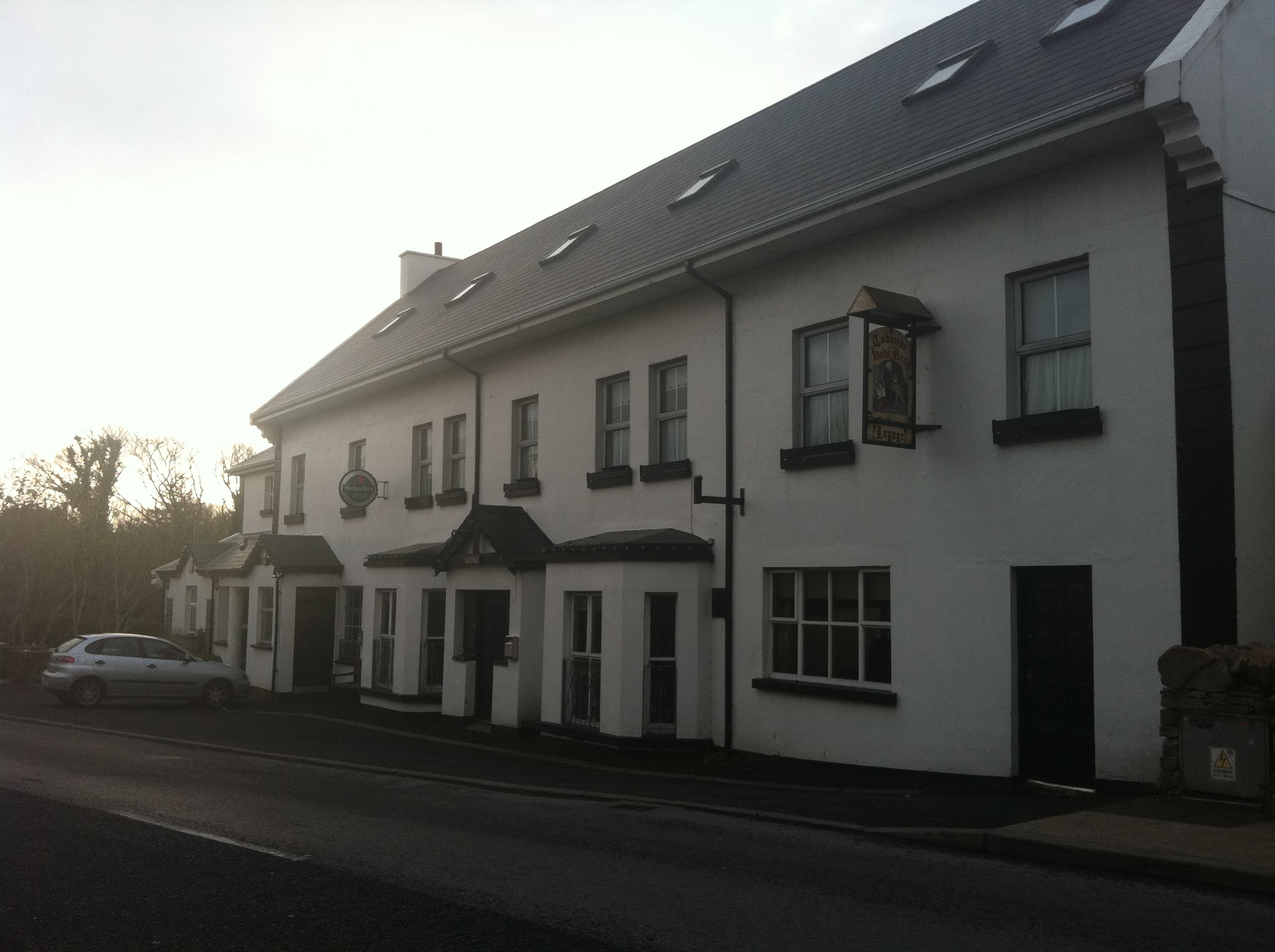
Hiúdaí Beag's Tavern, Bunbeg, Gweedore, the reputed birthplace of Vincent Coll

Coll was born in Gweedore, an Irish-speaking district, in County Donegal in Ulster, the northern province in Ireland. He was related to the notorious Curran family, and his family emigrated to the U.S. the following year as steerage passengers on board the S/S Columbia, sailing from port of Derry to the port of New York, April 3 to 12, 1909. Coll was a distant relative of the former Northern Ireland Assemblywoman Bríd Rodgers.

At age 12, Coll was first sent to a reform school. After being expelled from multiple Catholic reform schools, he joined The Gophers street gang. Run-ins with the law were almost inevitable. Vincent soon developed a reputation for being a wild child of the streets. At age 16, he was arrested for carrying a gun, and by the age of 23 he had been arrested a dozen times. In the late 1920s, he started working as an armed guard for the illegal beer delivery trucks of Dutch Schultz's mob.

== Mob assassin and kidnapper ==
Coll's ruthlessness made him a valued enforcer to Schultz at first. As Schultz's criminal empire grew in power during the 1920s, he employed Coll as an assassin. At age 19 Coll was charged with the murder of Anthony Borello, the owner of a speakeasy, and Mary Smith, a dance hall hostess. Coll allegedly murdered Borello because he refused to sell Schultz's bootleg alcohol. The charges were eventually dismissed, and many suspect this to have been due to Schultz's influence. Schultz was not happy about Coll's actions. In 1929, without Schultz's permission, Coll robbed a dairy in the Bronx of $17,000. He and his gang posed as armed guards to gain access to the cashier's room. Schultz later confronted Coll about the robbery, but rather than being apologetic, Coll demanded to be an equal partner; Schultz declined.

By January 1930, Coll had formed his own gang and was engaged in a shooting war with Schultz. One of the earliest victims was Peter Coll, Vincent's older brother, who was shot dead on May 30, 1931, while driving down a Harlem street. Coll subsequently went into a rage of grief and vengeance. Over the next three weeks he gunned down four of Schultz's men. In all, around 20 men were killed in the bloodletting; the exact figure is hard to pin down; New York was also in the midst of the vicious Castellammarese War at the same time. It was mayhem on the streets of Manhattan, and the police often had difficulty in deciding which corpse belonged to which war.

On June 2, Coll and his gang broke into a garage owned by Schultz and destroyed 120 vending machines and 10 trucks. As the war continued, Vincent Coll and his gang killed approximately 20 of Schultz's men. To finance his new gang, Coll kidnapped rival gangsters and held them for ransom. He knew that the victims would not report the kidnappings to police; they would have a hard time explaining to the Bureau of Internal Revenue why the ransom cash had not been reported as income. One of Coll's best-known victims was gambler George "Big Frenchy" DeMange, a close associate of Owney Madden, boss of the Irish Mob in Hell's Kitchen. According to one account, Coll telephoned DeMange and asked to meet with him. When DeMange arrived at the meeting place, Coll kidnapped him at gunpoint. He released DeMange 18 hours later after receiving a ransom payment.

== Alleged child killing ==
On July 28, 1931, Coll allegedly participated in a kidnapping attempt that resulted in the shooting death of a child. Coll's target was bootlegger Joseph Rao, a Schultz underling who was lounging in front of a social club. Several children were playing outside an apartment house. A large touring car pulled up to the curb, and several men pointed shotguns and submachine guns towards Rao and started shooting. Rao threw himself to the sidewalk, and four young children were wounded in the attack. One of them, five-year-old Michael Vengalli, later died at Beth David Hospital. After the Vengalli killing, New York City Mayor Jimmy Walker dubbed Coll a "mad dog".

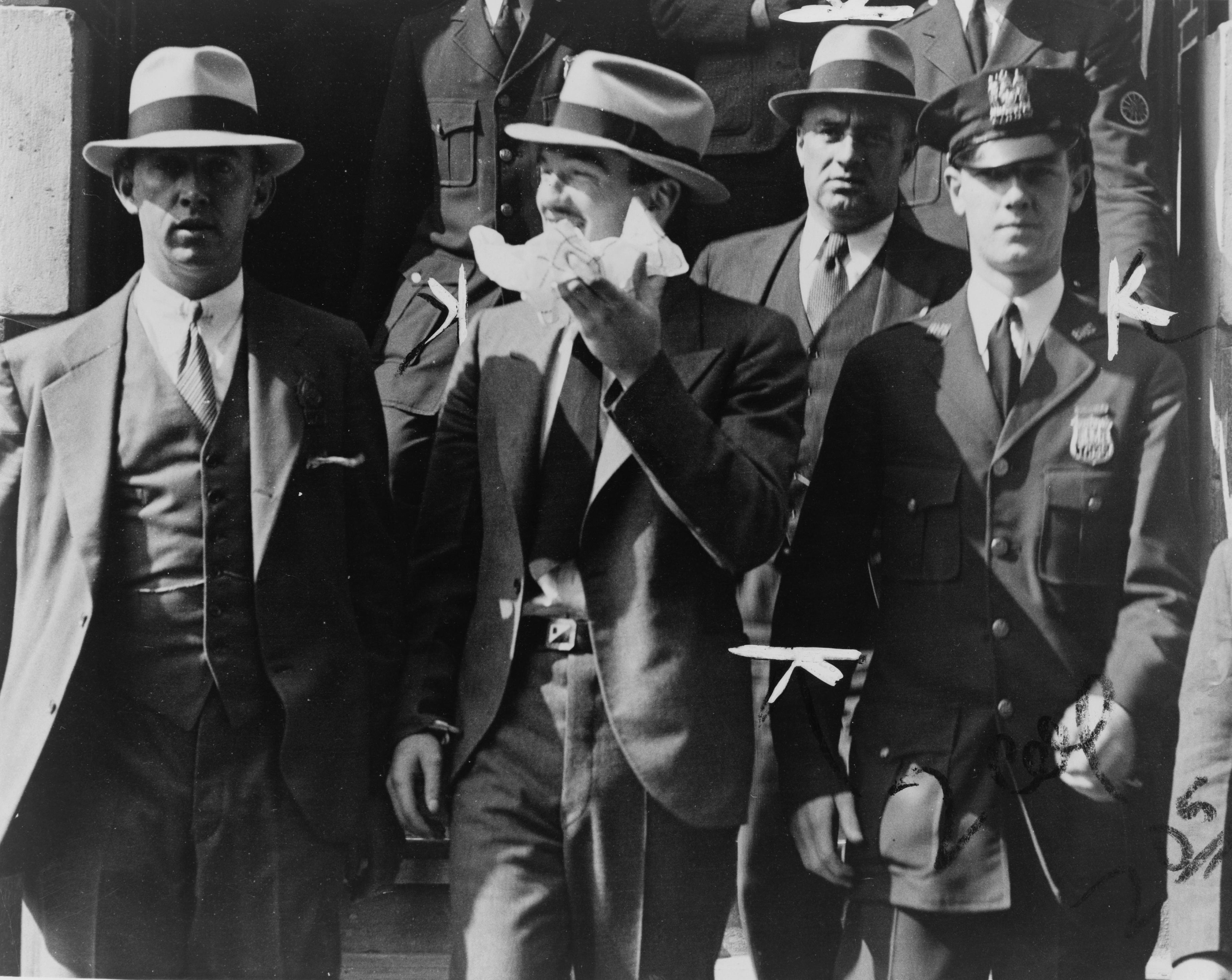
Vincent Coll leaving homicide court surrounded by police officers, 1931

On October 4, 1931, after an extensive manhunt, New York police arrested Coll at a hotel in the Bronx. He had dyed his hair black and grown a mustache and was wearing horn-rimmed glasses. He surrendered peacefully. During a police lineup, a defiant Coll said that he had been in Albany, New York, for the past several months and refused to answer any other questions without an attorney present. On October 5, a grand jury in New York City indicted Coll for the Vengalli murder.

The Coll trial began in December 1931. He retained famed defense lawyer Samuel Leibowitz. Coll claimed that he was miles away from the shooting scene and was being framed by his enemies. He added that he would love to tear the throat out of the person who killed Vengalli. The prosecution case soon fell apart. Their sole witness to the shooting, George Brecht, admitted on the witness stand to having a criminal and mental health record, and to making similar testimony in a previous murder case in St Louis, Missouri. At the end of December, the judge issued a directed verdict of not guilty for Coll.

Immediately after the Vengalli verdict, a New York City police inspector told Coll that the police would arrest him whenever he was spotted in New York City. He was soon rejailed for carrying a gun. When the inspector referred to Coll as a baby killer, Coll hotly replied, "I'm no baby killer". Soon after his acquittal, Coll married Lottie Kreisberger, a fashion designer in New York.

== Failed hit ==
In September 1931, between the killing of young Vengalli and his acquittal for that death, Coll was hired by Salvatore Maranzano, who had recently declared himself capo di tutti i capi, to murder Charles "Lucky" Luciano, the new acting boss of the Genovese crime family. Tommy Lucchese alerted Luciano that he was marked for death. Months earlier, Luciano had ended the Castellammarese War by ordering the assassination of his own boss, Joseph Masseria, which left Maranzano as the most powerful boss in the Five Families. Maranzano soon decided, however, that Luciano was a threat. On September 10, Maranzano summoned Luciano, Vito Genovese and Frank Costello to his office at the 230 Park Avenue in Manhattan. Certain that Maranzano planned to murder them, Luciano decided to act first. He sent four Jewish hitmen whose faces were unknown to Maranzano and his enforcers. They had been secured with the aid of Luciano's close associates Meyer Lansky and Bugsy Siegel. Disguised as government agents, two of the gangsters disarmed Maranzano's bodyguards. The other two, aided by Lucchese, who went along to point Maranzano out, stabbed the Sicilian boss multiple times and then finished him off by shooting him.

According to the 1963 testimony of government witness Joseph Valachi, Maranzano had paid Coll $25,000 for all three murders in advance, but when Coll arrived at Maranzano's office that same day intending to kill Luciano, Genovese, and Costello, he found Lucchese and the four Jewish hitmen fleeing the scene. After learning from them that Maranzano was dead, Coll left the building.

== Gangland death ==
Both Dutch Schultz and Owney Madden had put a $50,000 bounty on Vincent Coll's head. At one point, Schultz had walked into a Bronx police station and offered "a house in Westchester" to whoever killed Coll.

On February 1, 1932, four or five gunmen invaded a Bronx apartment which Coll was rumored to frequent and opened fire with pistols and submachine guns. Three people (Coll gangsters Patsy Del Greco and Fiorio Basile and bystander Emily Tanzillo) were killed. Three others were wounded. Coll himself did not show up until 30 minutes after the shooting.

A week after the Bronx shootings, at 12:30 am on February 8, Coll was using a phone booth at a drug store at Eighth Avenue and 23rd Street in Manhattan. He was reportedly talking to Madden, demanding $50,000 from the gangster under the threat of kidnapping his brother-in-law. Madden kept Coll on the line while it was traced. Three men in a dark limousine soon arrived at the drug store. While one waited in the car, two others stepped out. One man waited outside while the other walked inside the store. The gunman told the cashier, "Keep cool, now", drew a Thompson submachine gun from under his overcoat and opened fire on Coll in the glass phone booth. Coll died instantly. The killers took off in their car. They were chased unsuccessfully up Eighth Avenue by a foot patrolman who had heard the gunshots and commandeered a passing taxi, but the car got away.

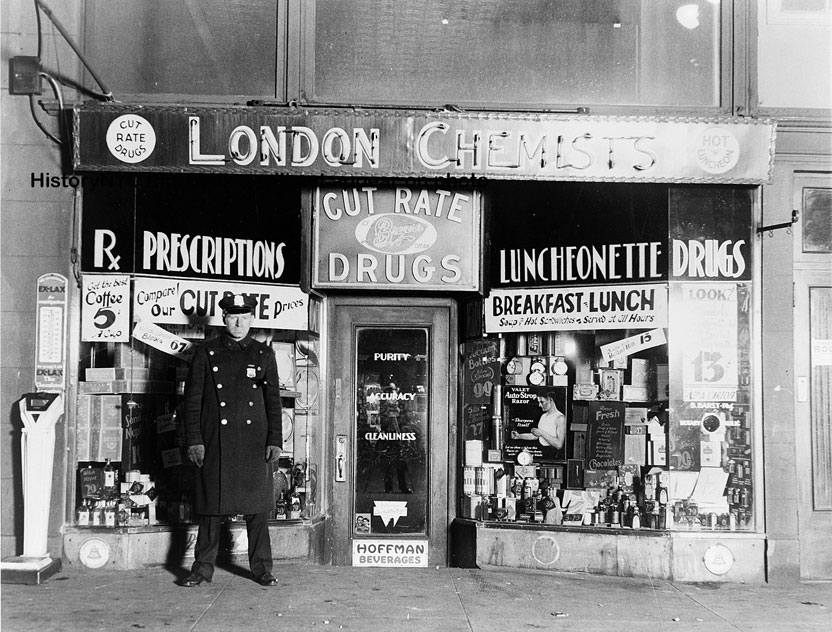
A New York City police officer standing outside the drugstore where Vincent Coll was murdered in 1932

A total of 15 bullets were removed from Coll's body at the morgue; more may have passed through him. Coll was buried next to his brother Peter at Saint Raymond's Cemetery in the Bronx. Dutch Schultz sent a floral wreath bearing a banner with the message "From the boys".

== Aftermath ==
Coll's killers were never identified. Dutch Schultz attorney Dixie Davis later claimed that gangster Bo Weinberg was the getaway driver of the limousine. Two suspects were Leonard Scarnici and Anthony Fabrizzo. Neither of them lived long. Fabrizzo was killed on November 20, 1932, after a failed attempt to kill Bugsy Siegel. Scarnici was executed on June 27, 1935. He was convicted of murdering a detective, but while awaiting execution in Sing Sing, he confessed to fourteen murders, including Coll. Another suspect was one of Coll's own men, Edward Popke (Fats McCarthy). The submachine gun that killed Coll was found a year later in the possession of a Hell's Kitchen gunman named "Tough" Tommy Protheroe, who used it during a 1933 saloon killing. On May 16, 1935, Protheroe and his girlfriend Elizabeth Connors were shot and killed by unknown triggermen in Queens.

Dutch Schultz continued to operate his rackets for only a few more years. On October 23, 1935, Schultz was killed at the Palace Chophouse in Newark, New Jersey. He was supposedly murdered on orders from Luciano and the new National Crime Syndicate.

Coll's widow, Lottie, was convicted of carrying a concealed weapon and sentenced to six months. She refused to leave prison following her parole because she feared the people who had killed her husband would also murder her.

In 1935 Owney Madden, still under police scrutiny for the Coll killing, moved to Arkansas, where he died in 1965.

== Portrayal ==
=== Film ===
Vincent Coll has been portrayed by the following actors in the following films:

- Richard Gardner in the 1960 film The Rise and Fall of Legs Diamond.
- Joseph Gallison in the 1961 film Portrait of a Mobster.
- John Davis Chandler in the 1961 film Mad Dog Coll.
- Nicolas Cage plays a fictionalized version of Coll in The Cotton Club.
- Nicholas Sadler in the 1991 film Mobsters.
- Christopher Bradley in the 1992 film Mad Dog Coll and reprised in the 1992 film Hit the Dutchman.

=== Television ===
Vincent Coll has been portrayed in the following TV shows:

- Clu Gulager in a 1959 episode Vincent 'Mad Dog' Coll of The Untouchables television series.
- Robert Brown in the 1961 two-part episode The Mad Dog Coll Story in the television series The Lawless Years.
- David Wilson in the 1981 TV series The Gangster Chronicles.

=== Music ===
Vincent Coll has been portrayed in the following songs:

- Mad Dog Coll by Mad Dog Mcrea on their 2015 album Almost Home.
