= Zanvil Weinberger =

Israeli Hasidic singer

Zanvil Weinberger זאנוויל וינברגר
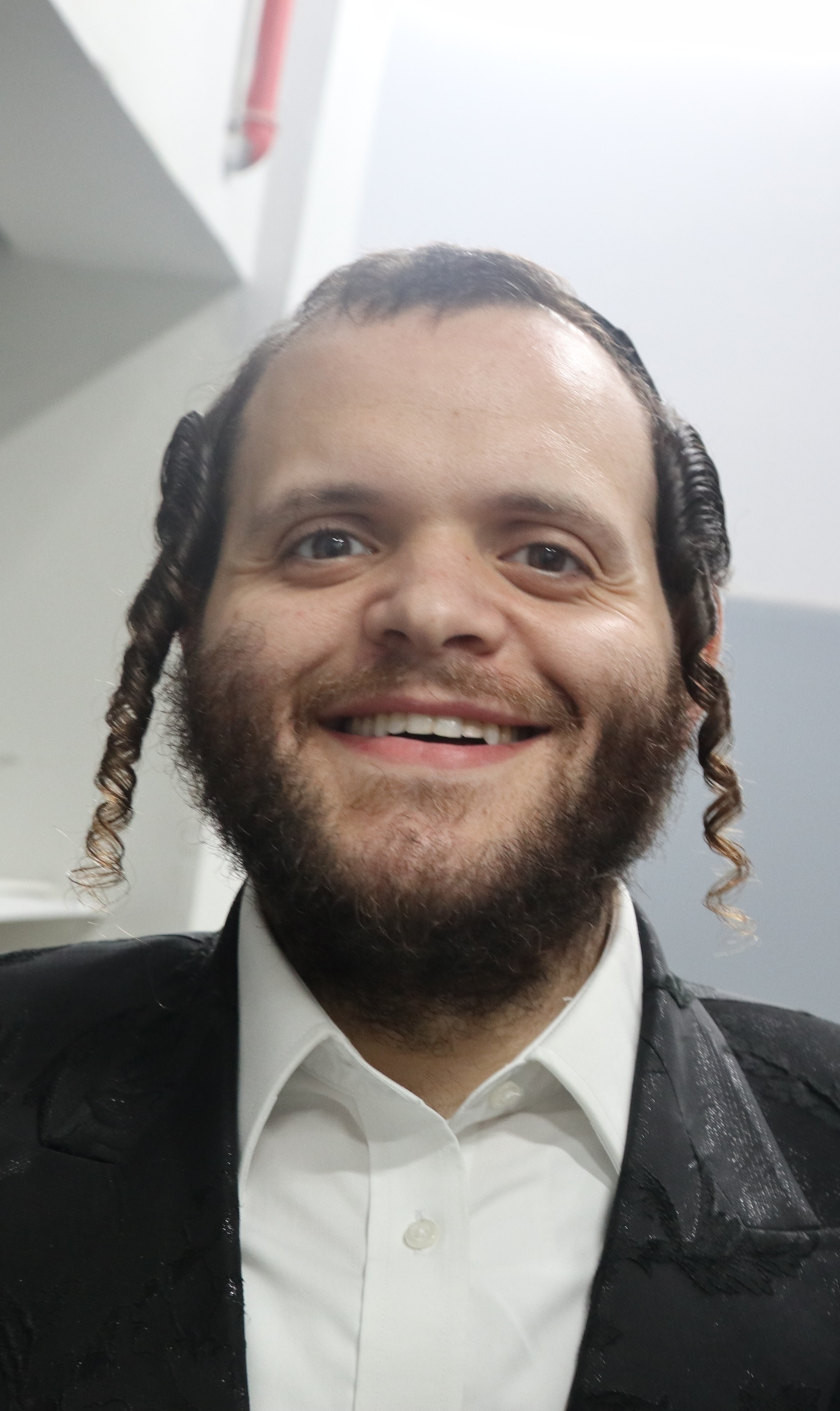

Background information
- Born: 1995 (age 29–30); Jerusalem
- Genres: Hasidic music
- Formerly of: Malchus Choir

Zanvil Weinberger (Hebrew: זאנוויל ויינברגר; born 1995) is an Israeli Hasidic singer.

Weinberger is known for his vocal performances and collaborations with various artists and choirs in Hebrew and in Yiddish. He has released several albums and singles, and has performed at numerous events and concerts.

== Early life and career ==
Weinberger was born in Israel in 1995 to Shlomo and Gitl Weinberger, followers of the Dushinsky Hasidic dynasty.

Weinberger's career has included collaborations with the Malchus Choir (מקהלת מלכות). He has performed at events such as the Tzema'ah (צמאה) gatherings in Jerusalem.

== Discography ==
- Ah Lechaim Mit Zanvil (א לחיים מיט זאנוויל)
- Min Hashamayim (מן השמים)
