= Vainberg =

Vainberg is a surname. Notable people with the surname include:

- Alexander Vainberg (born 1961), Russian politician
- Boris Rufimovich Vainberg (born 1930), Russian mathematician
- Mieczysław Weinberg (known as Moisei Vainberg; 1919–1996), Soviet composer

== See also ==
- Weinberg (disambiguation)
- Weinberger
