= Brett Banasiewicz =

American BMX rider

Personal information
- Full name: Brett Banasiewicz
- Nickname: Mad Dog
- Born: September 26, 1994 (age 32) South Bend, Indiana
- Height: 5 ft 8 in (1.73 m)
- Weight: 160 lb (73 kg)

Sport
- Country: United States
- Sport: BMX
- Rank: Numerous FISE (BMX Masters, Worlds, Extreme Playgrounds, JOMOPRO, Simple session, Dew Tour, BMX ...) medals
- Turned pro: 2008

Brett Banasiewicz (born September 26, 1994), nicknamed "Mad Dog", is an American professional BMX rider living in South Bend, Indiana. He became a professional BMX rider at the age of 13. In the 2010, 2011, and 2012 Brett competed in the BMX park discipline at the X Games finishing 4th, 7th and 4th respectively. On August 23, 2012, he crashed in a practice session at the Vans LXVI BMX Invitational at Virginia Beach, Virginia suffering a head injury. He spent 15 days in a medically induced coma whilst being treated at Sentara Princess Anne Hospital (Virginia Beach, VA).

Brett also has a cousin who is a famous BMX rider: Hannah Roberts.

== Contest history ==
- 2012
  - 4th BMX Worlds, BMX Dirt
  - 1st Dew Tour, Ocean City, BMX Park
  - 1st ASA Big-Air BMX Triples Orange County
  - 3rd FISE Costa Rica, BMX Park
  - 1st FISE Montpellier, BMX Park
  - 1st FISE Montpellier, BMX Dirt
- 2011
  - 2nd Dew tour Cup, BMX Dirt
  - 3rd Air in the Square, MegaRamp ASA Triples
  - 2nd Telekom Extreme Playgrounds, BMX Dirt
  - 2nd Telekom Extreme Playgrounds, BMX Park
  - 2nd BMX Masters, BMX Spine Ramp
  - 3rd Dew Tour Las Vegas, BMX Dirt
  - 1st Dew Tour Salt Lake City, BMX Dirt
  - 2nd Simpel Session, BMX Park
- 2010
  - 4th X Games 2010, BMX Park
  - 2nd Dew Cup 2010, BMX Dirt
  - 3rd Dew Tour 2010 Salt Lake City, BMX Dirt
  - 2nd Dew Tour 2010 Portland, BMX Park
  - 1st Dew Tour 2010 Portland, BMX Dirt
  - 1st Dew Tour 2010 Chicago, BMX Dirt
  - 1st BMX Masters 2010 Cologne, BMX Park
  - 2nd BMX Masters 2010 Cologne, BMX Dirt
  - 1st Box Jump ASA BMX Triples
  - 3rd FISE Montpellier, BMX Park
  - 4th FISE Montpellier, BMX Dirt
  - 3rd JOMOPRO, BMX Park
  - 1st T-Mobile Extreme Playgrounds, BMX Park
  - 2nd Toronto BMX Jam, BMX Park
  - 4th Nike 6.0 BMX Pro Barcelona, BMX Park
  - 4th Nike 6.0 BMX Pro Huntington Beach, BMX Park
  - 2nd Simpel Session, BMX Park
  - 1st DK Dirt Circuit, BMX Dirt
- 2009
  - 2nd Mini-Ramp, BMX World Championships
  - 3rd JOMOPRO, BMX Park
