= George Weinberg (mobster) =

George Weinberg (1901 – January 29, 1939) was a New York mobster and, with brother Abraham Weinberg, an associate of Dutch Schultz as a mob accountant during the 1920s and 1930s. In 1935, following the disappearance of his brother and the gangland murder of Schultz, he decided to become a government informant and testified against his former associates.

However, while under police protection in a safehouse in White Plains, New York, he stole a gun from one of the detectives guarding him and committed suicide on January 29, 1939.
