= Weinburg =

- Municipality
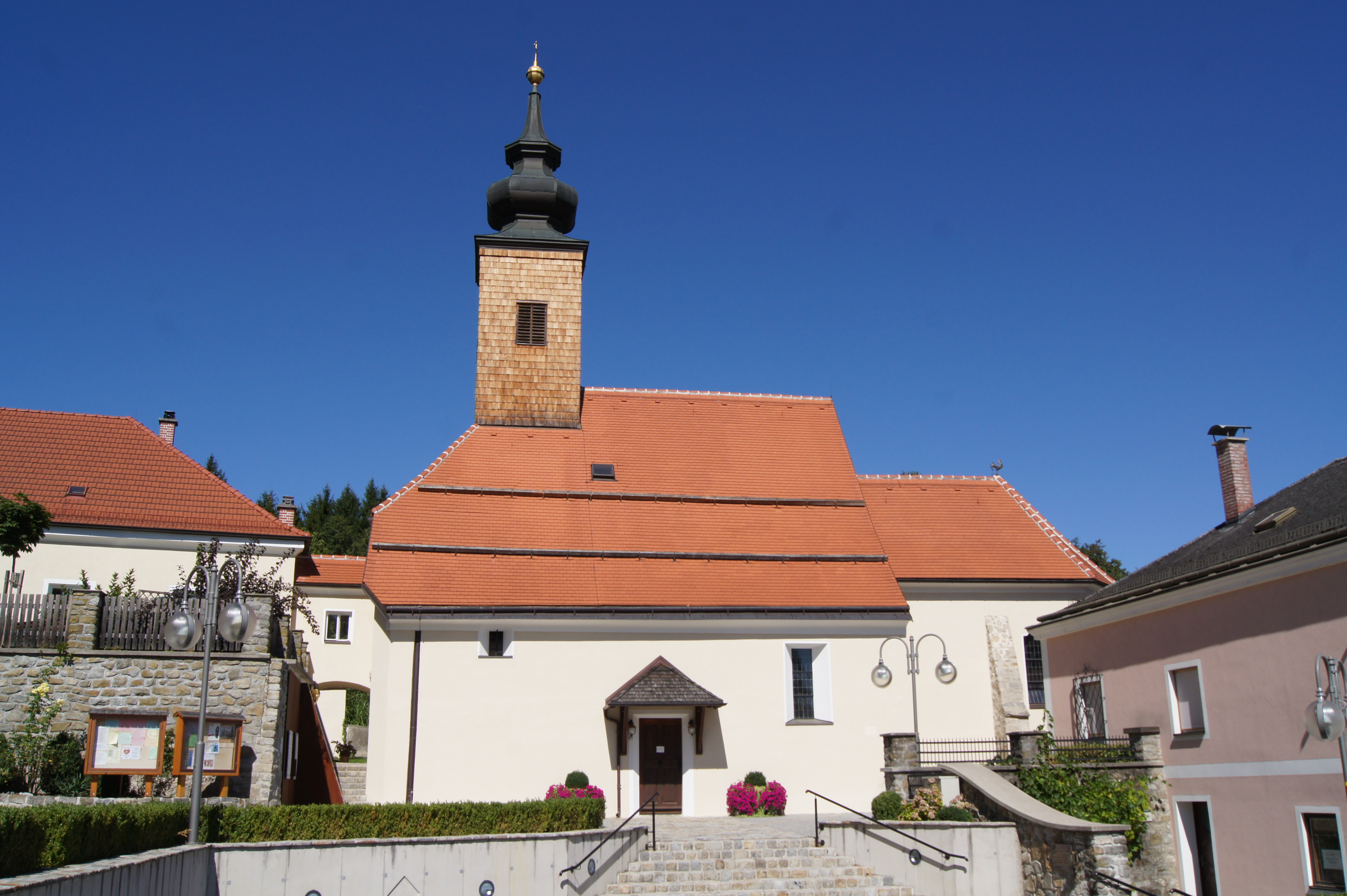
- Weinburg parish church

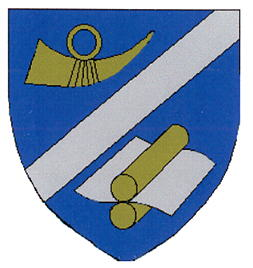
- Coat of arms

- Location within Austria
- Coordinates: 48°06′00″N 15°32′00″E
- Country: Austria
- State: Lower Austria
- District: Sankt Pölten-Land

Government
  - Mayor: Peter Kalteis (SPÖ)

Area
  - Total: 10.36 km^{2} (4.00 sq mi)
- Elevation: 321 m (1,053 ft)

Population (2018-01-01)
  - Total: 1,337
  - Density: 129.1/km^{2} (334.2/sq mi)
- Time zone: UTC+1 (CET)
  - Summer (DST): UTC+2 (CEST)
- Postal code: 3200
- Area code: 02747
- Vehicle registration: PL
- Website: www.weinburg.eu

Weinburg is a municipality in the district of Sankt Pölten-Land in the Austrian state of Lower Austria.

== Population ==
Historical population
Year	Pop.	±%
1951	805	—
1961	804	−0.1%
1971	1,025	+27.5%
1981	1,174	+14.5%
1991	1,264	+7.7%
2001	1,316	+4.1%
2012	1,293	−1.7%
