= Gladys Davidson Weinberg =

American archaeologist

- Weinberg at the Acropolis in 1944
- Born: December 27, 1909; New York City, US
- Died: January 14, 2002 (aged 92); Columbia, Missouri, US
- Occupations: archaeologist, librarian

Gladys Davidson Weinberg (December 27, 1909 – January 14, 2002) was an American archaeologist known for her work on ancient and medieval glass and its manufacture in the Mediterranean. She was the editor of Archaeology magazine from 1952 to 1967.

== Early life and education ==
She was born Gladys Davidson in New York City to Hebrew literary scholar Israel Davidson and Carrie (Dreyfuss) Davidson, one of two daughters. She received a B.A. from New York University in 1930 and her Ph.D. from Johns Hopkins University in 1935. Her dissertation was about the excavations at Corinth.

== Career ==
Her archaeological career began with a Johns Hopkins University expedition to Olynthus in 1931. She was appointed a Special Fellow of the School and kept working in Greece until 1938. She studied at the American School of Classical Studies at Athens from 1932 to 1938. After that, she became assistant curator of ancient art at the Princeton Art Museum for four years. During much of the 1940s, she did library work, serving as a translator and librarian in the Foreign Service Auxiliary of the U.S. State Department in Istanbul and Athens from 1943 to 1945. She then worked as a librarian from 1946 to 1948 at the American School for Classical Studies in Athens. In the 1950s and early 1960s while she was editing Archaeology magazine, she conducted several excavations searching for ancient glass factories, focusing on the early centuries when glass vessels first became household products. The Corning Museum of Glass sponsored one of her excavations in Crete in 1959. in 1965 she was the editor of a collection of analyses published in the Transactions of the American Philosophical Society called The Antikythera Shipwreck Reconsidered in which they considered the issue of dating the Antikythera wreck based on what was on board the ship.

She relocated to the University of Missouri in 1948 where her husband later became co-founder and chairman of the department of art history and archaeology. She worked as curator of ancient art through 1973, assistant director from 1973 to 1977 and a research fellow from 1977 to 2002. She was co-founder of the Museum of Art and Archaeology at the University of Missouri with her husband, where she promoted the study and appreciation of ancient objects. She also founded and became the first editor of Muse, Annual of the Museum of Art and Archaeology in 1966.

Weinberg and her husband received the gold medal for Distinguished Archaeological Achievement from the Archaeological Institute of America in 1985. In 1986, she received the Percia Schimmel Award for Archaeological Exploration in Biblical Lands from the Israel Museum.

Weinberg's papers are held at the American School of Classical Studies at Athens and at the Corning Museum of Glass.

== Personal life ==
She married Saul Weinberg in 1942, and they had one daughter, Susanna Miriam. She died in Columbia, Missouri, in 2002 at the age of 92.
