= George Weinberg (psychologist) =

American psychologist

- Born: May 17, 1929; New York City, US
- Died: March 20, 2017 (aged 87); New York City, US
- Occupation: Psychologist
- Known for: Coining the term "homophobia"
- Spouse: Dianne Rowe

George Weinberg (May 17, 1929 – March 20, 2017) was an American psychologist. He was the author of several books. He coined the term "homophobia" in the 1960s, it first appearing in the press in 1969.

== Early life ==
George Weinberg was born on May 17, 1929, to a Jewish family. His father, Frederick Weinberg, was a lawyer while his mother, Lillian Hyman, was a secretary for a law firm. He grew up without his father in the Washington Heights neighborhood of Manhattan.

Weinberg graduated from City College of New York, and went on to earn a master's degree in English from New York University in 1951, where he also studied statistics at the Courant Institute of Mathematical Sciences. He subsequently earned a doctorate in clinical psychology from Columbia University. Weinberg's extensive background in mathematics was reflected in his doctoral thesis, "Clinical versus Statistical Prediction in Psychology", and he later wrote the textbook, Statistics, An Intuitive Approach.

== Career ==
Weinberg coined the term "homophobia". He began contemplating it after remembering having witnessed abhorrence towards a lesbian friend while preparing to deliver a speech in 1965. The word was first printed in Screw on May 5, 1969, followed by Time a few months later. Gay Times stated after his death in 2017 that he invented it in 1965. By 1972, Weinberg explained the use of term in Society and the Healthy Homosexual. He suggested that those who harbor prejudice against homosexuals, and not homosexuals themselves, are suffering from a psychological malady, an irrational state of mind. Weinberg, though heterosexual himself, became a leader in the (successful) campaign to have homosexuality removed as a diagnostic category from the DSM, the professional therapeutic handbook. He was instrumental in shifting public perception of homosexuality.

Weinberg's widely read, seminal 1984 book, The Heart of Psychotherapy, described innovative therapeutic methods that de-emphasize traditional therapy's approach. He instead presented immediately practical tools that patients can use to help themselves.

== Personal life and death ==
Weinberg was married to Dianne Rowe, with whom he collaborated. He died of cancer on March 20, 2017.

== Bibliography ==
- The Action Approach. New York: St. Martin's Griffin, 1969. First printing, July, 1970
- The Heart of Psychotherapy: A Journey into the Mind and Office of a Therapist at Work. New York: St. Martin's Press, 1984, reprinted 1996.
- Invisible Masters: Compulsions and the Fear that Drives Them. New York: Grove/Atlantic Press, 1993.
- Nearer to the Heart's Desire. New York. Grove/Atlantic Press, 1992.
- Numberland. New York: St. Martin's Press, 1987.
- The Pliant Animal: Understanding the Greatest Human Asset. New York: St. Martin's Press, 1981.
- Self Creation. New York: St. Martin's Press, 1978.
- Shakespeare on Love. New York: St. Martin's Press, 1991.
- Society and the Healthy Homosexual. New York: St. Martin's Press, 1972, reprinted 1983.
- Statistics: An Intuitive Approach. Belmont, California: Brook's/Cole, fourth printing, 1981.
- The Taboo Scarf. New York: St. Martin's Press, 1990.
- Why Men Won't Commit: Getting what you Both Want Without Playing Games. New York: Atria Books, 2003.

== Collaborations with Dianne Rowe ==
- The Projection Principle. New York: St. Martin's Press, 1988.
- Will Power! Using Shakespeare's Insights to Transform Your Life. New York: St. Martin's Press, 1996.
