= Dutch Schultz =

American mobster (1901–1935)

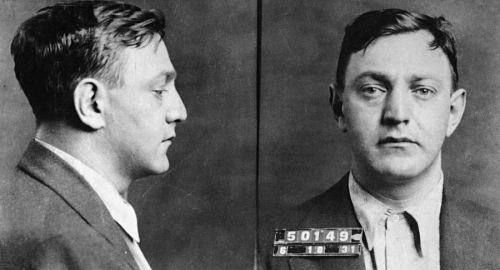
- Schultz's 1931 mugshot
- Born: Arthur Simon Flegenheimer; August 6, 1901; New York City, New York, U.S.
- Died: October 24, 1935 (aged 34); Newark, New Jersey, U.S.
- Cause of death: Peritonitis from a gunshot wound
- Resting place: Gate of Heaven Cemetery, Hawthorne, New York, U.S.
- Other names: Arthur Schultz; Joseph Harmon; Charles Harmon
- Years active: 1918–1935
- Organization: Noe-Schultz Gang
- Known for: Murder, bootlegging, numbers game, extortion
- Opponents: The Rock Brothers (the Bronx); Legs Diamond; Lucky Luciano; U.S. Attorney Thomas Dewey; Bumpy Johnson
- Allegiance: New York City's Five Families

Arthur Simon Flegenheimer (August 6, 1901 – October 24, 1935), known as Dutch Schultz, was an American mobster based in New York City in the 1920s and 1930s. He made his fortune in organized crime-related activities, including bootlegging and the numbers racket. Schultz's rackets were weakened by two tax evasion trials led by United States Attorney Thomas Dewey, and also threatened by fellow mobster Lucky Luciano.

Schultz asked the Commission, the governing body of the American Mafia, for permission to kill Dewey, in an attempt to avert his conviction. They refused. When Schultz disobeyed them and made an attempt to kill Dewey, the Commission ordered his murder in 1935. Schultz was shot at a restaurant in Newark, New Jersey, and died the next day.

== Early life ==
Arthur Simon Flegenheimer was born in the Bronx borough of New York City on August 6, 1901. He was the second child of German Jewish immigrants Herman and Emma Flegenheimer (née Neu), who had married in Manhattan on November 10, 1900. He had a younger sister, Helen, born in 1904. Flegenheimer's father apparently abandoned his family, and his mother is listed as divorced in the 1910 United States census. In her 1932 petition for U.S. citizenship, however, she wrote that her husband had died in 1910–though it is unclear whether he died before or after the 1910 census.

This event traumatized young Flegenheimer, who spent the rest of his life denying that his father had abandoned his family. He dropped out of school in the eighth grade to help support himself and his mother. He worked as a feeder and pressman for the Clark Loose Leaf Company, Caxton Press, American Express and Schultz Trucking in the Bronx between 1916 and 1919.

=== Criminal beginnings ===
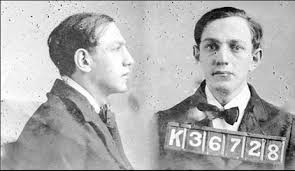
Dutch Schultz 1919 mugshot

Before turning to burglary, Flegenheimer worked at a neighborhood nightclub owned by a small-time mobster, where he robbed craps games. Eventually he was caught breaking into an apartment and sent to the prison on Blackwell's Island (now called Roosevelt Island). His mugshot, at age 18, was published in the 2010 book New York City Gangland. Flegenheimer proved to be such an unmanageable prisoner that he was transferred to a work farm in Westhampton, Long Island. After he was recaptured following an escape, he had two months added to his sentence.

Flegenheimer was released on parole on December 8, 1920, and went back to work at Schultz Trucking. With the enactment of the Volstead Act and the start of Prohibition, the shipping company began smuggling alcoholic beverages into New York City from Canada. This led Flegenheimer to start associating with known criminals. It was also during this time that Flegenheimer became better known as "Dutch" Schultz. Following a disagreement, he left Schultz Trucking and went to work for their Italian competitors.

== Criminal career ==
=== Bootlegger ===
In the mid-1920s, Schultz had begun work as a bouncer at the Hub Social Club, a small speakeasy in the Bronx owned by a gangster named Joey Noe. Noe was impressed with Schultz's reputation for brutality and made him a partner. Together they soon opened more illegal drinking establishments around the Bronx. Using their own trucks to reduce high delivery costs, they brought in beer made by Frankie Dunn, a brewer in Union City, New Jersey. Schultz often rode shotgun to guard the trucks from hijackers.

Schultz and Noe soon had to deal with brothers John and Joe Rock, who were already running a bootlegging operation in the Bronx. Initially the brothers refused to buy beer from Noe and Schultz, but eventually John, the elder brother, agreed to cooperate; however, his younger brother Joe refused. One night the Noe-Schultz gang kidnapped Joe, beat him and hung him by his thumbs from a meat hook. They then allegedly wrapped a gauze bandage smeared with discharge from a gonorrhea infection over his eyes. Joe's family reportedly paid $35,000 for his release. Shortly after his return, he went blind. From then on, the Noe-Schultz gang met little opposition as they expanded across the entire Bronx. Bootlegging during Prohibition made Schultz very wealthy.

In May 1929 he attended the historic Atlantic City Conference, believed to be the first ever national summit of the American mafia.

=== Gang wars ===
The Noe-Schultz operation, which had begun to flourish in the Bronx, soon became the only gang able to rival the network of Italian crime syndicates that became the Mafia's Five Families. When the gang expanded from the Bronx over to Manhattan's Upper West Side and the neighborhoods of Washington Heights, Yorkville and Harlem, they moved their headquarters to East 149th Street in the Bronx. However, this brazen move led to a bootleg war with New York's Irish mob, led by Jack "Legs" Diamond.

In the early hours of October 16, 1928, Noe was shot several times outside the Chateau Madrid, a speakeasy at 231 West 54th. Although seriously wounded, he managed to return fire. A blue Cadillac was seen hitting some parked cars and losing one of its doors before speeding away. When police found the car an hour later, they discovered the body of a Louis Weinberg (no relation to Schultz gang members Abraham "Bo" Weinberg and George Weinberg) in the backseat. Noe's wounds became infected, and he died on November 21. Schultz was left angry and distraught by the loss of his friend and mentor.

Retaliation started a few weeks later when Arnold Rothstein, a crime boss in the Jewish mob, was found fatally shot near the service entrance to the Park Central Hotel on November 6, 1928. Although George "Hump" McManus supposedly killed Rothstein over an unpaid gambling debt, Schultz is believed to have ordered the killing in retribution for Noe's death. This theory is supported by the fact that the first individual McManus rang after the killing was Schultz's attorney, Dixie Davis. Schultz's trusted lieutenant, Bo Weinberg, then picked up McManus and drove him away from the murder scene. McManus was later cleared of the killing.

On October 12, 1930, Diamond was shot and wounded at the Hotel Monticello on Manhattan's West Side. Two gunmen forced their way into Diamond's room and shot him five times before fleeing. Still in his pajamas, Diamond staggered into the hallway and collapsed. When asked later by the New York City police commissioner how he managed to walk out of the room, Diamond said he drank two shots of whiskey first. Diamond was rushed to the Polyclinic Hospital in Manhattan, where he eventually recovered. On December 30, 1930, Diamond was discharged from Polyclinic. During his absence, his gang was forced to leave the city. When he returned home, Diamond began carving out a new territory for himself in Albany. He was killed in an Albany rooming house at 67 Dove Street by two gunmen in December 1931.

Schultz also had to deal with internecine conflicts within his own gang. In 1930 one of his enforcers, Vincent Coll, demanded to be made an equal partner. This was because Schultz's subordinates received a flat salary instead of the customary percentage from the take—a unique arrangement compared to other major gangs in organized crime. When Schultz refused, Coll formed his own crew with the ultimate goal of murdering Schultz and taking over his territory. In the bloody gang war that followed, Coll lost his older brother Pete and earned the nickname "Mad Dog" from the press after a child was killed during a botched assassination attempt committed by his gang. In February 1932, while Coll was taking a call in a drugstore phone booth, gunmen armed with machine guns entered the store and shot him to death. The killers may have included Edward "Fats" McCarthy and the brothers Bo and George Weinberg.

=== Racketeer ===
Along with the policy rackets, Schultz began extorting New York restaurant owners and workers. Working through a hulking gangster named Jules Modgilewsky (also known as Julie Martin), Schultz made deals with the leaders of Waiters Local 16 and Cafeteria Workers Local 302 to extort money by forcing restaurant owners to join the Metropolitan Restaurant & Cafeteria Owners Association, an employer association that Schultz had founded. Those who refused to join the Association were faced with exorbitant wage demands from labor unions, followed by strikes and stink bomb attacks. The Association then stepped in to arrange a settlement of the strike with a sweetheart contract for low wages contingent on the employer joining the Association. Martin successfully extracted thousands of dollars of tributes and "dues" for Schultz from the terrorized restaurant owners.

During his tax trial, Schultz began to suspect that Martin was skimming from the shakedown operation; Schultz had recently discovered a $70,000 disparity in the books. On the evening of March 2, 1935, Schultz invited Martin to a meeting at the Harmony Hotel in Cohoes, New York. At the meeting, at which chief enforcer Bo Weinberg and mob lawyer Dixie Davis were also present, Martin belligerently denied Schultz's charges and began arguing with him. Both men were drinking heavily as the argument continued, and Schultz sucker-punched Martin. Finally, Martin admitted that he had taken $20,000, which he believed he was "entitled to" anyway. Davis related what happened next:

Dutch Schultz was ugly; he had been drinking and suddenly he had his gun out. Schultz wore his pistol under his vest, tucked inside his pants, right against his belly. One jerk at his vest and he had it in his hand. All in the same quick motion he swung it up, stuck it in Jules Martin's mouth and pulled the trigger. It was as simple and undramatic as that—just one quick motion of the hand. Dutch Schultz did that murder just as casually as if he were picking his teeth.

As Martin contorted on the floor, Schultz apologized to Davis for killing someone in front of him. When Davis later read a newspaper story about the murder, he was shocked to find out that the body was found on a snowbank with a dozen stab wounds to the chest. When Davis asked about this, Schultz replied, deadpan, "I cut his heart out."

=== Trials for tax evasion ===
In the early 1930s, United States Attorney Thomas Dewey had set his sights on convicting Schultz for non-payment of federal taxes. Schultz was indicted in New York in January 1933 and became a fugitive. He surrendered in Albany in November 1934 as part of a plan to have his trials moved from New York City to upstate. His first tax evasion trial, in Syracuse, ended in a hung jury, with many speculating he'd bribed the jurors. He would face retrial in Malone.

With the case going to a second trial, Schultz quickly set about presenting himself to the townspeople of Malone as a country squire and good citizen. He donated cash to local businesses, gave toys to sick children and performed other charitable deeds. The strategy worked, as he was acquitted in late summer 1935. New York Mayor Fiorello La Guardia was so outraged at the verdict that he issued an order that Schultz should be arrested on sight should he return to the city. As a result, Schultz was forced to relocate his base of operations across the Hudson River to Newark, New Jersey.

== Assassination ==
=== Betrayal ===
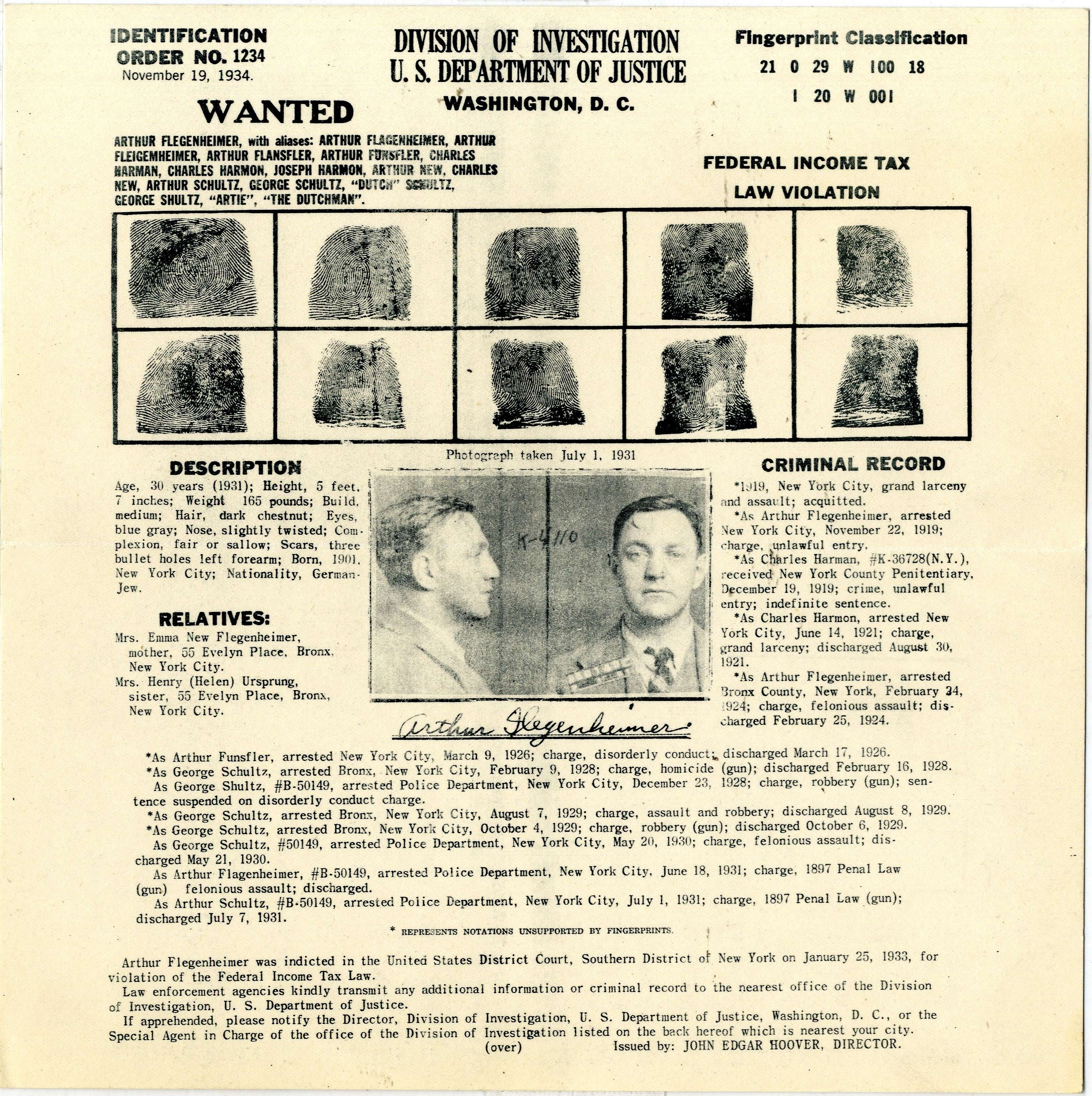
Dutch Schultz Wanted Poster 1934

As his legal defense costs in the tax case mounted, Schultz had found it necessary to reduce the commission he paid to those running his policy rackets to bolster what he called the "Arthur Flegenheimer Defense Fund." This tactic angered the runners and the games' controllers, who, despite being threatened with violence for showing any dissent, hired a hall, held a mass protest meeting and declared their version of a strike. Very quickly the cash flow dried up, and Schultz was forced to back down, permanently damaging the relationship between his gang and their associates.

Bo Weinberg, Schultz's chief lieutenant, was so concerned about the amount of money that Schultz was taking from the rackets that he sought advice from New Jersey mob boss Longy Zwillman, who put him in touch with the Sicilian-born gangster Charles "Lucky" Luciano. The deal that Weinberg wanted was to retain a percentage and keep overall control of the Schultz gang. However, Luciano planned to break up the gang's rackets and territory among his own associates once Schultz was convicted of tax evasion. Believing that a guilty verdict was a foregone conclusion at the second trial, Luciano and his allies implemented their plan to take control, which met little resistance because of the ongoing bad feelings over the attempted pay cuts and the support of Weinberg.

However, after his acquittal, Schultz quickly arranged a meeting with Luciano through the Commission to clarify the situation. Luciano explained to Schultz that they were just "looking after the shop" while he was away to ensure that everything ran smoothly, and that full control of his rackets would be returned to Schultz once the heat died down. Publicly, Schultz was forced to accept that version of events because of the ongoing attention from law enforcement agencies and Dewey, then a special prosecutor appointed by LaGuardia. A month after his acquittal, Bo Weinberg disappeared after he had walked out of a Midtown Manhattan nightclub.

Schultz had proposed to the National Crime Syndicate, a confederation of mobsters, that Dewey be murdered. Luciano argued that the assassination of a high-profile prosecutor would precipitate a massive law enforcement crackdown. The Commission later voted unanimously against the proposal. An enraged Schultz told the group that he would kill Dewey anyway and walked out of the meeting. Later, Murder, Inc. leader Albert Anastasia approached Luciano with information that Schultz had asked him to stake out Dewey's apartment building on Fifth Avenue. Upon hearing the news, the Commission held a discreet meeting to discuss the matter. After six hours of deliberations, the Commission ordered Louis Buchalter to eliminate "The Dutchman."

=== Shooting ===
Dutch Schultz was shot on October 23, 1935, at the Palace Chop House restaurant at 12 East Park Street in Newark, along with his accountant Otto Berman; Abraham “Abe” Landau, his new chief lieutenant; and his personal bodyguard, Bernard "Lulu" Rosenkrantz. While Schultz was in the men's room, two Murder, Inc. hitmen named Charles "The Bug" Workman and Emanuel "Mendy" Weiss entered the establishment. Workman walked the length of the bar and opened the door to the men's room, where he encountered Schultz. Workman shot Schultz, who dropped to the floor. He then entered the rear dining room with Weiss, with both men firing numerous times at the Schultz gang members.

Berman collapsed immediately after he was shot. Landau's carotid artery was severed by a bullet passing through his neck, and Rosenkrantz was hit repeatedly at point-blank range. Despite their injuries, both gangsters rose to their feet, returned fire and drove the assassins out of the restaurant. Weiss jumped into the getaway car and ordered the driver to abandon Workman. Landau chased Workman out of the bar and emptied his pistol at him but missed. After Workman had fled on foot, Landau collapsed onto a nearby trashcan.

Witnesses say Schultz staggered out of the bathroom, clutching his side and sat at his table. He called for anyone who could hear him to get an ambulance. Rosenkrantz rose to his feet and demanded that the barman, who had hidden during the shootout, give him some change. Rosenkrantz called for an ambulance before he lost consciousness.

When the first ambulance arrived, medics determined Landau and Rosenkrantz were the most seriously wounded and needed to be taken immediately to Newark City Hospital. A second ambulance was called to take Schultz and Berman. Berman was unconscious, but Schultz was drifting in and out of lucidity as police attempted to comfort him and get information. Because the medics had no pain relievers, Schultz was given brandy to relieve his suffering.

When the second ambulance arrived from Newark City Hospital, Schultz gave an intern in the ambulance $3,000 in cash because he thought he was dying and said that it was not going to do him any good where he was going. After surgery, when it looked as if Schultz might live, the intern was so worried that he would come back for his cash that he handed in the money. Landau and Rosenkrantz refused to say anything to police until Schultz had given them permission after he had arrived in the second ambulance. Even then, they provided the police with only minimal information.

At 2:20 am, Berman, the oldest and least physically fit of the four men, was the first to die. Landau died of blood loss at 6 am. When Rosenkrantz was taken into surgery, the surgeons were so incredulous that he was still alive despite his blood loss and ballistic trauma that they were unsure of how to treat him. He eventually died from his injuries 29 hours after the shooting.

=== Death ===
Schultz received the last rites from a Catholic priest at his request just before he went into surgery. He reportedly believed Jesus enabled him to beat an indictment and had promised to convert. He lingered for almost one day, speaking in various states of lucidity with his wife, mother, a priest, police and hospital staff before dying of peritonitis on October 24, 1935.

Schultz was permitted interment in the Roman Catholic Gate of Heaven Cemetery in Hawthorne, Westchester County, New York, but at the request of his Orthodox Jewish mother his body was draped with a talit, a traditional Jewish prayer shawl.

In 1941, Workman was convicted of killing Schultz and was sentenced to life imprisonment. He was paroled in 1964. The building that housed the Palace Chop House was torn down in 2008.

== Final words and legacy ==
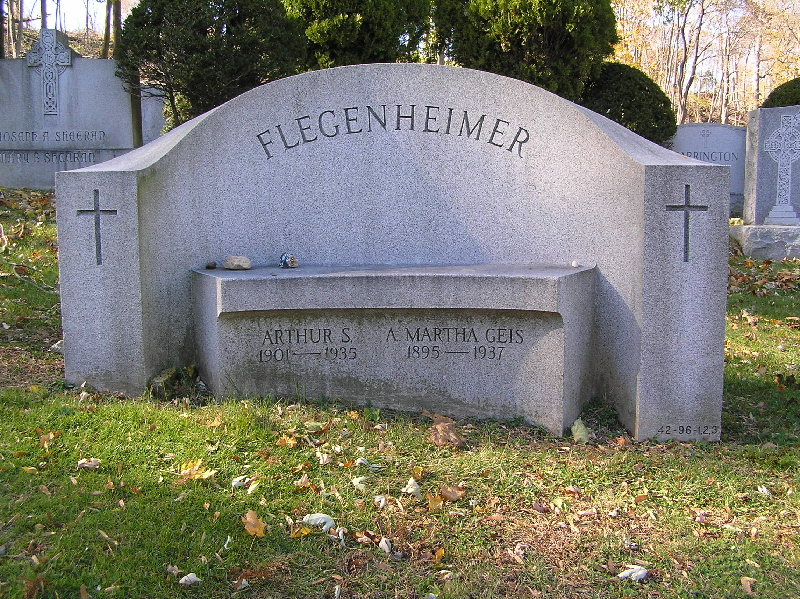
The headstone of Dutch Schultz in Gate of Heaven Cemetery, Hawthorne, New York

Schultz's last words were a strange stream-of-consciousness babble spoken in his hospital bed to police officers who attempted to calm him and question him for useful information. Although the police were unable to extract anything coherent from Schultz, his rambling was fully transcribed by a police stenographer. These include:

A boy has never wept...nor dashed a thousand kim.
You can play jacks, and girls do that with a soft ball and do tricks with it.
Oh, Oh, dog Biscuit, and when he is happy he doesn't get snappy.

Schultz's last words have inspired a number of writers to devote works related to them. Beat Generation author William S. Burroughs published a screenplay in novel form titled The Last Words of Dutch Schultz in the early 1970s, while Robert Shea and Robert Anton Wilson connected Schultz's words to a global Illuminati-related conspiracy, making them a major part of 1975's The Illuminatus! Trilogy. In Wilson's and Shea's story, Schultz's ramblings are a coded message. In his 1960 anthology Parodies: An Anthology from Chaucer to Beerbohm and After, Dwight Macdonald presents Schultz's last words as a parody of Gertrude Stein. In E. L. Doctorow's novel Billy Bathgate, the title character uses clues from Schultz's deathbed ramblings to locate his hidden money.

Although Schultz's gang was meant to be crippled, several of his associates survived the night. Martin "Marty" Krompier, whom Schultz left in charge of his Manhattan interests while he hid in New Jersey, survived an assassination attempt the same night as the shootings at the Palace Chop House. No apparent attempt was made on the life of Irish mobster John M. Dunn, who later became the brother-in-law of mobster Edward J. McGrath and a powerful member of the Hell's Kitchen Irish mob.

After Schultz's death, it was discovered that he and his wife had never gone through an official marriage ceremony, and the possible existence of another wife emerged with the discovery of letters and pictures of another woman and children among his effects at the hotel where he was staying in Newark. This was never resolved, as his common-law wife refused to talk about the matter and the mystery woman never came forward. Two other women also called at the morgue to receive his effects, but their identities were never established.

Though Schultz was estimated to be worth $7 million when he died, no trace of the money was ever found. Shortly before his death, fearing that he would be incarcerated as a result of Dewey's efforts, he commissioned the construction of a special airtight and waterproof safe into which he placed $7 million in cash and bonds (equivalent to $164,000,000 in 2025). Schultz and Rosenkrantz then drove the safe to an undisclosed location somewhere in the Catskill Mountains in upstate New York and buried it there. At the time of his death, the safe was still interred. With no evidence to indicate that either Schultz or Rosenkrantz had ever revealed the location of the safe to anyone (or that it even existed), the exact location where it was buried died with them. Schultz's enemies are said to have spent the remainder of their lives searching for the safe. As it has never been recovered, treasure hunters have annually returned to look for it in the Catskills. One such meeting became the documentary film Digging for Dutch: The Search for the Lost Treasure of Dutch Schultz.

== In popular culture ==
Several actors have portrayed Dutch Schultz in film and television: Vic Morrow in Portrait of a Mobster (1961), Vincent Gardenia in Mad Dog Coll (1961), James Remar in The Cotton Club (1984), Dustin Hoffman in Billy Bathgate (1991), Lance Henriksen in The Outfit (1993), and Tim Roth in Hoodlum (1997).

On television, in the 1959 The Untouchables episodes "Vincent 'Mad Dog' Coll", "The Dutch Schultz Story" and "Jack 'Legs' Diamond", Schultz was played by Lawrence Dobkin. He was portrayed by John Dennis in ten episodes of The Lawless Years from 1959 to 1961. These episodes included: "The Dutch Schultz Story", "The Jack 'Legs' Diamond Story", "Louy K, part two: 'Sing Sing'", "Louy K, part three: 'Birth of the Organization'", "Louy K, part four: 'Heyday of the Organization'", "Louy K, part five: 'The Disintegration'", "Ginny", "The 'Mad Dog' Coll Story, part one", "The 'Mad Dog' Coll Story, part two", and "Ike, the Novelty King". In the 1993–1994 series The Untouchables, he was portrayed by Si Osborne in the 1993 episode "Attack on New York". In the 2015 AMC series The Making of the Mob: New York, he was played by Christopher Morrow.

In the Naked City episode The Fault in Our Stars, a Beat poet recites a fragment of Schultz' last words.

On November 18, 2020, a PBS Secrets of the Dead episode entitled "Gangster's Gold" premiered which detailed the investigation and the hunt for Schultz's lost treasure. In July 2022, an episode of Expedition Unknown, titled "The Bootlegger's Millions", focused on Schultz and his treasure.

== See also ==
- List of Jewish American mobsters
- Prohibition Operations in Getty Square neighborhood in Yonkers, New York
- Billy Bathgate by E.L. Doctorow
- Button Man by Andrew Gross

== Bibliography ==
- Addy, Ted (1962). The "Dutch" Schultz Story: The Bloody Chronicle of a Vicious Killer who Became Public Enemy No. 1. Monarch Books.
- Hendley, Nate (2011). Dutch Schultz: The Brazen Beer Baron of New York. Five Rivers Chapmanry. ISBN 978-0986642388.
- Sann, Paul (1971). Kill the Dutchman! The story of Dutch Schultz. Arlington House.

Preceded by Casper Holstein and Stephanie St. Clair	Policy racket in New York City c. 1932–1935	Succeeded by Michael "Trigger Mike" Coppola
