= Bernard Rosenkrantz =

American mobster (1902–1935)

- Born: 1902
- Died: October 25, 1935 (aged 32–33); Newark, New Jersey
- Cause of death: Gunshot
- Other name: Lulu
- Known for: Dutch Schultz's chauffeur and bodyguard

Bernard "Lulu" Rosenkrantz (1902 – October 25, 1935) was a New York mobster and Dutch Schultz's chauffeur and bodyguard. He was shot at the Palace Chophouse in Newark, New Jersey, on October 23, 1935, moments after Schultz was shot. He died two days later in the Newark City Hospital.

In 1938, Rosenkrantz and Schultz were named as co-conspirators in an indictment of Tammany Hall political boss James Joseph Hines that led to Hines' conviction for racketeering.
