= Dixie Davis =

American lawyer

J. Richard Davis (1905 – December 30, 1969), also known as Dixie Davis, was the lawyer for mobster Dutch Schultz.

== Biography ==
Davis was born in New York City in 1905 and grew up in Tannersville, New York, after his father, a tailor named Davidowitz, relocated the family to the Catskills. Davis attended Syracuse University Law School and was admitted to the New York State Bar in 1927. He served a clerkship, and then started his firm in New York City specializing in defending mobsters.

Many of Davis' clients were African-Americans involved in the numbers game in Harlem. In 1932, he decided that he could take control and brought in Dutch Schultz as an enforcer, only to lose control to Schultz.

With the murder of Schultz in 1935, Davis took over his numbers racket. On July 14, 1937, a grand jury indicted Davis for racketeering. In exchange for cooperation, Davis was sentenced to one year in prison and disbarred.

On December 30, 1969, Dixie Davis died of a heart attack in his home in Bel-Air, California after a break-in. Two masked gunmen had bound his wife and grandson and had stolen jewels, furs, and cash. Davis fell unconscious after he and his son learned of the robbery.

The character Tommy Farrell in the 1958 film Party Girl is loosely based on him.
