= Lanphier =

Lanphier is a surname and may refer to:

- Fay Lanphier (1905–1959), model
- James Lanphier (1920–1969), American actor
- Jeremiah Lanphier (1809–1898), lay missionary
- Thomas George Lanphier Sr. (1890–1972), early aviator
- Thomas George Lanphier Jr. (1915–1987), World War II pilot

== See also ==
- Lanphier High School, Springfield, Illinois
