= Shewfelt (disambiguation) =

Shewfelt may refer to:

== People ==
- Addie Shewfelt, who did one of the Bible translations into Athabaskan languages for Gwichʼin
- Deb Shewfelt, Canadian politician, longtime mayor of Goderich, Ontario, Canada, who lost the 2014 Huron County municipal elections
- Grant Shewfelt, Canadian curler who participated in the 2023 Viterra Championship
- Kyle Shewfelt (born 1982), Canadian gymnast
- Robert L. Shewfelt, who won the 2006 William V. Cruess Award
- William Shewfelt, U.S. actor who portrayed a Power Ranger, who was nominated for the 2018 Kids' Choice Award for Favorite Male TV Star

== Other uses ==
- Shewfelt (vault), a gymnastics vault manoeuver named after Canadian gymnast Kyle Shewfelt, a Yurchenko-type vault

== See also ==
- Felt (disambiguation)
