= Thomas George Lanphier =

Thomas George Lanphier may refer to:

- Thomas George Lanphier Sr. (1890–1972), early aviator
- Thomas George Lanphier Jr. (1915–1987), World War II pilot
