= Peter H. Matthews =

American criminal

Peter H. Matthews (1873 – July 21, 1916) was an operator of policy games in New York City.

In 1915, agents of Charles Henry Parkhurst's Society for the Prevention of Crime and 45 police officers raided his gambling operations and rounded up a number of persons connected with this crime. Many were known associates of the previous policy king Al Adams. Among them, Matthews and two other ring leaders John J. Saul and Solomon Goldschmidt were arrested, held on bail of $10,000 (in 2005 dollars, more than $184,000) each, and tried. They confessed, were convicted, and were leniently sentenced. In 1916, Matthews died at a city hospital on Blackwells Island, probably while serving his sentence at the penitentiary there.

== See also ==
- Lexow Committee
- Lottery

Preceded by Albert J. Adams	Policy racket in New York City circa 1905–1915	Succeeded by Casper Holstein in Manhattan and Stephanie St. Clair in Harlem
