= Zachariah Simmons =

American underworld figure

Zachariah Simmons (c. 1826 — February 22, 1903) was an American underworld figure involved in running policy games in New York during the late 19th century. Supported by the Tweed Ring, he took over the policy rackets from Reuben Parsons and John Frink following the end of the American Civil War. He would run three-fourths of the city's six or seven hundred policy operations and eventually held interests as far away as Milwaukee and Richmond. He would eventually retire during the 1880s and turned control over to one of his runners, Albert J. Adams who would continue to run Simmons' policy games until the reform movements during the 1910s.

Preceded by Reuben Parsons and John Frink	Policy racket in New York City circa 1860–1880	Succeeded by Albert J. Adams
