= Casper Holstein =

American mobster (1877–1944)

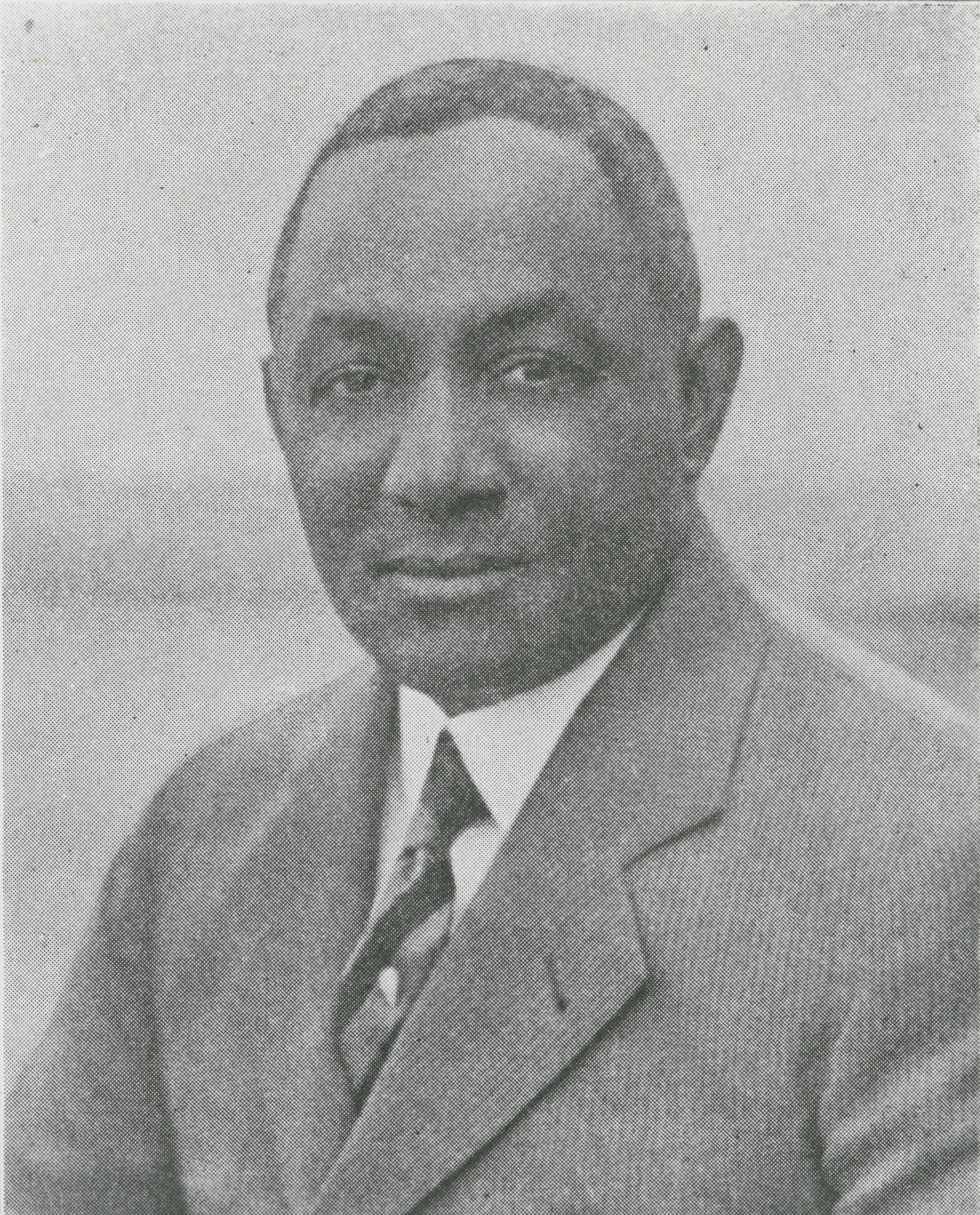
- Casper Holstein, in Opportunity magazine
- Born: December 6, 1877; Christiansted, St. Croix, Danish West Indies
- Died: April 5, 1944 (aged 66); New York City, New York, U.S.

Casper Alexander Holstein (December 6, 1877 – April 5, 1944) was an American mobster involved in the Harlem "numbers rackets" during the 1920s. He was also a philanthropist and small banker. He funded literary prizes during the Harlem Renaissance. Born in the Virgin Islands, he continued to support and aid his community from New York through lobbying for civil rights and providing direct economic aid.

== Early life ==
Caspar Alexander Holstein was born on December 6, 1875, in Christiansted, when the islands were under Danish rule. He attended schools in the Danish school system on Saint Croix. In 1888, Holstein moved to New York City with his mother.

During World War I, he was able to revisit his birthplace while stationed in what had become the United States Virgin Islands. He served in the United States Navy for more than four years. He learned embalming in Chicago, but did not complete his courses.

== Rebirth of the Harlem numbers racket ==
By the end of the 1920s, Holstein had become a dominant figure among Harlem's numerous policy operators. Although both he and his rival, Stephanie St. Clair, claimed to have invented the way that "numbers games" chose the winning number, both claims have long been in dispute.

== Political activism ==
Holstein was a major donor towards charitable purposes such as building dormitories at Black colleges, as well as financing many of the neighborhood's artists, writers, and poets during the Harlem Renaissance.

He bought the mortgage on the New York hall of the Universal Negro Improvement Association. He was a supporter of Marcus Garvey. He also helped establish a Baptist school in Liberia and supported an orphanage in Gary, Indiana.

Holstein supported the literary arts and was a financial contributor to the literary banquets hosted by Opportunity: A Journal of Negro Life. He also wrote for Opportunity, especially on topics relating to the Virgin Islands.

=== Virgin Islands ===
Holstein felt connected to the Virgin Islands and provided economic aid to the islands, spending more than $250,000 in Saint Croix. Holstein was against martial rule in the Virgin Islands, going to the federal government of the United States to lobby against "naval rule" of the islands. Holstein provided hurricane relief for his native Virgin Islands in 1924 and 1928, providing large sums of money and building materials.

== Kidnapping and loss of fortune ==
On September 21, 1928, Holstein was kidnapped and held for a ransom of $50,000. He was released three days later, insisting that no ransom was paid.

After the kidnapping his fortune began to decline. By 1931, Holstein was considered "broke" as gambling began to prove less lucrative and White gangsters pushed Black competition away.

== Death and legacy ==
Holstein died in New York on April 5, 1944, in the home of Alverstone Smothergill, a beneficiary of his philanthropic work.

=== In popular culture ===
Casper Holstein, portrayed by actor Rony Clanton, appears by name in the 1984 film The Cotton Club as the largest operator in the New York City numbers game. The character Valentin Narcisse, played by Jeffrey Wright in seasons 4 and 5 of the HBO period crime-drama Boardwalk Empire, was inspired by Holstein.

| Preceded by Peter H. Matthews | Policy racket in New York City c. 1923–1932 | Succeeded by Dutch Schultz |
