= Reuben Parsons =

American gambler and underworld figure

- Born: New England, United States
- Occupation(s): Gambler, businessman
- Known for: Underworld figure who controlled illegal gambling in New York during the early-to mid 19th century; first to establish illegal gambling and policy banks.

Reuben Parsons (fl. 1840–1860) was an American gambler and underworld figure in New York during the early-to mid 19th century. He was the first man, along with partner John Frink, to establish illegal gambling and policy banks. Parsons was considered the top gambler, known as the "Great American Faro Banker", and held control over illegal gambling in the city for more than two decades. His operations are considered the first major criminal organization, although neither centralized nor having a corporate-like structure, its system remaining in place for well over a century and surviving in various forms up until as late as the late 1980s.

== Life ==
A native of New England, Parsons originally arrived in New York City with the intention of starting his own business. He lost the small fortune he had brought with him, several thousand dollars, in a gambling house soon after his arrival. Impressed by how quickly he had lost his money, he instead decided to open his own gambling house and used his entrepreneurial skills to build a successful gambling empire by financing other gamblers. He also differed from typical gamblers by being "dressed plainly and was unassuming in manner". Parsons also refrained from publicly appearing at his establishments, allowing John Frink to handle the day-to-day operations, and never gambled after his first experience.

From 1840 until the 1860s, he and Frink controlled around 350 gambling parlors in Manhattan as well as employed a network of spies and informants. Their organization lacked any formal structure however, as least compared to the organized crime syndicates seen during the next century, and most operators retained independent control of their own establishments. Parsons used his income from gambling which he invested in real estate and was eventually able to retire. His operations were continued by Zachariah Simmons, supported by the Tweed Ring, who ran illegal gambling and the "policy rackets" during the post-Civil War era.

Preceded by N/A	Policy racket in New York City circa 1840–1860	Succeeded by Zachariah Simmons
