= Albert J. Adams =

American racketeer

- Born: May 22, 1845; Blackstone, Massachusetts, US
- Died: October 1, 1906 (aged 61); Ansonia Hotel, New York, US
- Occupation: Numbers game

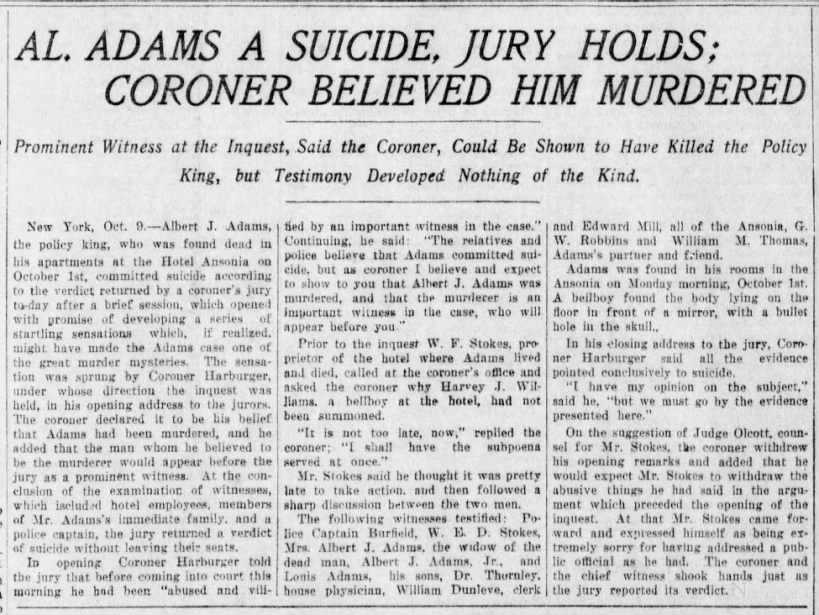
Headline on the death of Albert J. Adams

Albert James Adams (May 22, 1845 – October 1, 1906), known as "The Policy King" and the "Meanest Man in New York," was an American racketeer. He ran the numbers game in New York City from around 1890 to around 1905.

== Life ==
Adams was born in Massachusetts and lived in Rhode Island before he moved to New York City in 1871 as a brakeman for the railroad. He married Isabella (1840–?) and had six children. In 1880, he was living at 236 West 38th Street in Manhattan and listed himself as a "segar dealer".

He was named by the Lexow Committee, and was replaced by Peter H. Matthews when he retired. The anonymous testifier at the Lexow Committee in 1894 said: "[the principal policy backers in this city are] Al Adams, 'Jake' Shipsey, Cornelius B. Parker, 'Billy' Myers, 'Ed' Hogan, [and] Charles Lindauer. ...Al has the most ... sheets, and he is the biggest man, and has the most money, and has the biggest pile. ... He is called the king of the policy dealers. ... Al Adams has from Fourteenth Street up on the west side mostly." After a 1901 raid on his gambling operation by F. Norton Goddard, the police estimated that he was making more than $1 million a year, and after his conviction in 1903, it was revealed that he had been allowed to stay at the Waldorf-Astoria until he was sentenced. He was sentenced on April 21, 1903, to "not less than a year and not more than one year and nine months" in Sing-Sing.

On April 5, 1904, his application for parole was denied by the New York State Board of Parole. The board members being C. V. Collins, the Superintendent of Prisons; State Treasurer John G. Wickser and president of the New York State Prison Commission John P. Jaeckel. This meant he was to stay in prison for the maximum time of the sentence.

On October 8, 1905, he wrote to The New York Times that he had quit the policy racket forever.

Adams had several legitimate business ventures as well. He owned several corner lots, capitalizing on the real estate through the establishment of saloons. He was also president of the Amalgamated Goldmines Company, whose holdings included a mine in Guanajuato, Mexico.

He committed suicide at the Ansonia Hotel in 1906 after losing several million dollars by investing in a business venture with his eldest son. The funeral was held at 471 West End Avenue; he was 61 years old. His death did not end the policy racket in New York City.

Preceded by Zachariah Simmons	Policy racket in New York City c. 1890–1905	Succeeded by Peter H. Matthews
