= Charles Frederick Lindauer =

American businessman and criminal

Charles Frederick Lindauer I
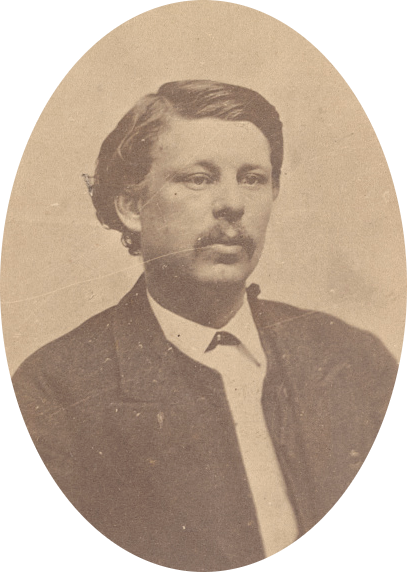
- Charles Frederick Lindauer (c. 1870)
- Born: c. 1836; Philadelphia, Pennsylvania, USA
- Died: 1921 (aged 84–85)
- Spouse: Anna Augusta Kershaw (m. 1857; died 1921)

Charles Frederick Lindauer I (c. 1836–1921) was a New York businessman and criminal. He was involved in the New York City corruption scandal of 1894 as the policy dealer, cigar dealer and tobacconist in Manhattan and Hoboken, at Lindauer and Company. He was a Free and Accepted Mason.

== Early life ==
Lindauer was born in 1836 in Philadelphia to Oscar Arthur Moritz Lindauer (1815–1866) and Sophia Weber (1815–1891). He was the eldest of four children. His siblings were John Jacob (1841–1888), Louis Julius (1842–1915), and Eloise (1852–1944).

Lindauer received his first Masonic degree on March 23, 1861 and his second on April 3, 1861, and completed his membership on January 27, 1864. Tom Savini of the Livingston Masonic Library noted that Lindauer may have served in the American Civil War, since "it is not usual to have a three-year gap between the 2nd and 3rd degrees."

== Career ==
Lindauer worked as a cigar dealer by 1880. He was involved in the 1894–1895 corruption scandal in New York City and his name came up in the Lexow Committee hearings run by State Senator Clarence Lexow. Testimony involving Charles was: "Lindauer has a new place [in New York City]; he is a small fry backer."

== Personal life ==
In February 1857, Charles married Anna Augusta Kershaw (1841–1931), most likely in New York City. They had six children: Eloise (1861–1935), William (1866-c.1870), Adeline (1862-before 1921), Anna Lillian (1872–1956), Harry Chauncey (1877–1923), and LeBaron "Lee" Hart (1879–1945). He died in 1921 from myocarditis and he was buried in Greenwood Union Cemetery.
