= Greenwood Union Cemetery =

Cemetery in Rye, New York

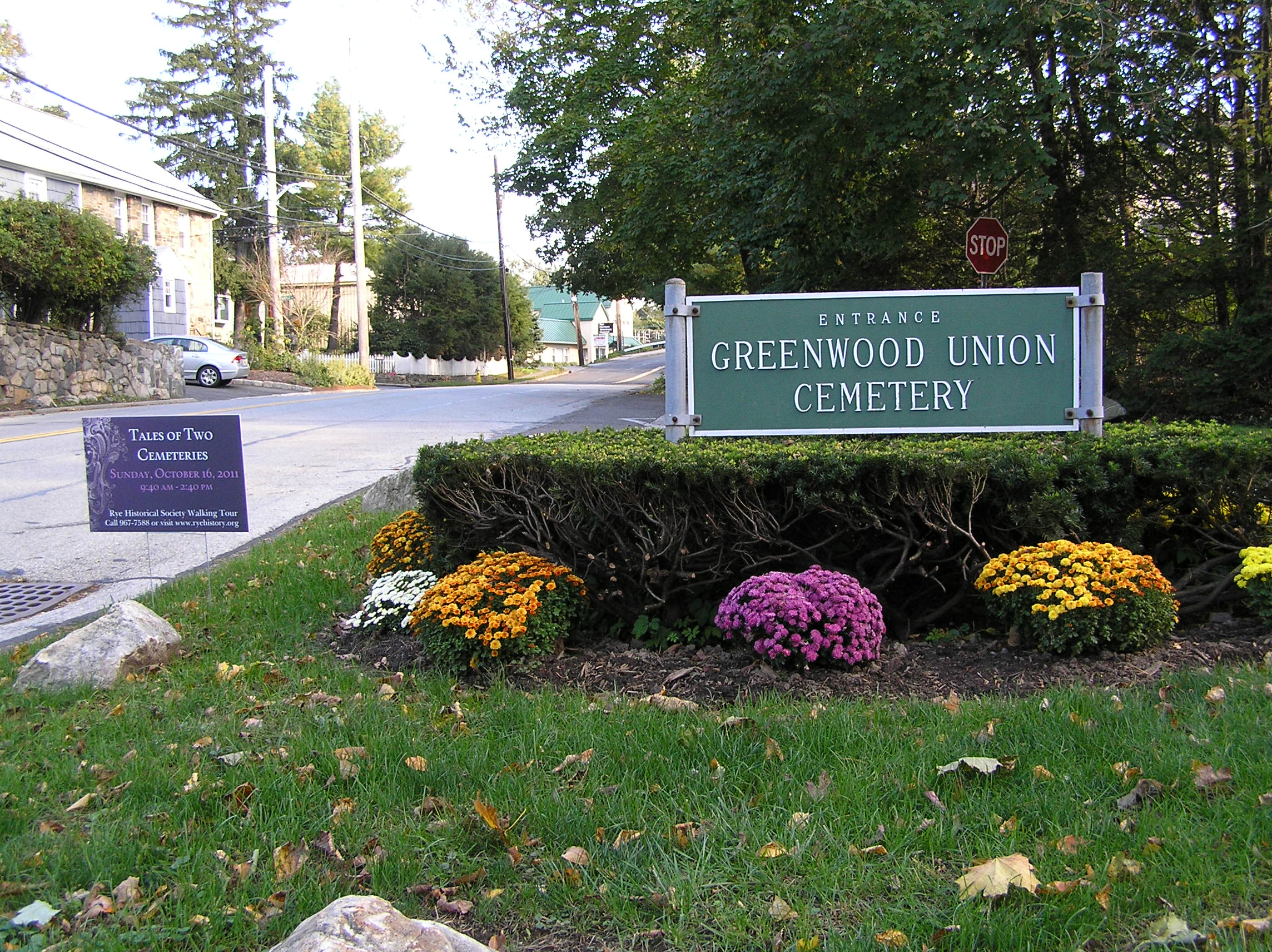
- Main entrance
- Interactive map of Greenwood Union Cemetery

Details
- Established: 1837
- Location: Rye, New York
- Country: United States
- Coordinates: 40°58′44″N 73°42′09″W
- Owned by: Non-sectarian, non-profit corporation
- Size: 54 acres (22 ha)
- No. of graves: 27,000+
- Website: http://greenwoodunion.org
- Find a Grave: Greenwood Union Cemetery

The Greenwood Union Cemetery is a cemetery in Rye and Harrison in Westchester County, New York.

== History ==
The first cemetery on this site was established in 1837 and it was known as "Union Cemetery of Rye". James Parker and David Brooks of Rye donated 3 acres (12,000 m^{2}) of land to Christ's Church, Rye, with plots to be reserved for the ministers of the three churches of Rye and their families. Two strips on the eastern and western sides of the grounds were to be used as a public cemetery.

In January 1855, the trustees of the Methodist Episcopal Church, Rye bought an additional 8 acres (32,000 m^{2}) contiguous to the cemetery, and, between 1864 and 1868, they added more than 6 acres (24,000 m^{2}). The total land was then 14.25 acres (57,700 m^{2}).

Methodist Episcopal Church operated the cemetery from 1855 until 1902, when it transferred management to a Rural Cemetery Corporation organized under the Rural Cemetery Act of 1847. This arrangement continued from 1902 to 1984, under the leadership of successive generations of the Cowan family, but in 1984 the responsibility of management was turned over to a nonprofit organization with a volunteer elected board of trustees whose members are lot owners and local community leaders.

== Notable burials ==
- Bill Bergesch (1921–2011) American Major League Baseball executive.
- Bud Cort (1948–2026), American actor
- Eddie Eagan (1897–1967) one of only two people to win a gold medal in the Winter and Summer Olympic Games.
- Marta Eggerth (1912–2013) Hungarian-born singer and actress.
- Marquis James (1891–1955) American author.
- Elia Kazan (1909–2003) American film and theatre director.
- Jean Kerr (1922–2003) American author.
- William West Kirkby (1827–1907), Rector of Christ's Church, Rye.
- Edward LeMaire (1924–1961) American figure skater.
- Charles Frederick Lindauer (c. 1836–1921), New York businessman and criminal.
- John McGillicuddy (1930–2009) American banking executive.
- John Motley Morehead III (1870–1965) former mayor of Rye and US Ambassador to Sweden.
- Jared Valentine Peck (1816–1891) US Representative.
- Marvin Pierce (1893–1969), president of McCall Corporation and father of Barbara Bush.
- Clarine Seymour (1898–1920) American actress.
- George Smith (1892–1965) American Major League Baseball pitcher.
- Dick Surhoff (1929–1987) American National Basketball Association player.
- Jonathan Mayhew Wainwright (1864–1945) US Congressman.
- Edward B. Wesley (1811–1906) stockbroker, banker and co-founder of the New York Times.
