= Hammie Snipes =

Hammie Snipes (31 December 1906 – 1973) was an African-American political activist in Harlem, New York. Although he was for a time active in Marcus Garvey's Universal Negro Improvement Association and African Communities League (UNIA), he later became a prominent Communist Party activist.

In October 1936, Snipes gave a speech in support of equal pay for African-American members of the Meat Cutters union. Sufi Abdul Hamid and Allen McAlpine stabbed Snipes on both arms, resulting in him having ten stitches. Hamid received a twenty-day prison sentence for the act.
