= Bible translations into Athabaskan languages =

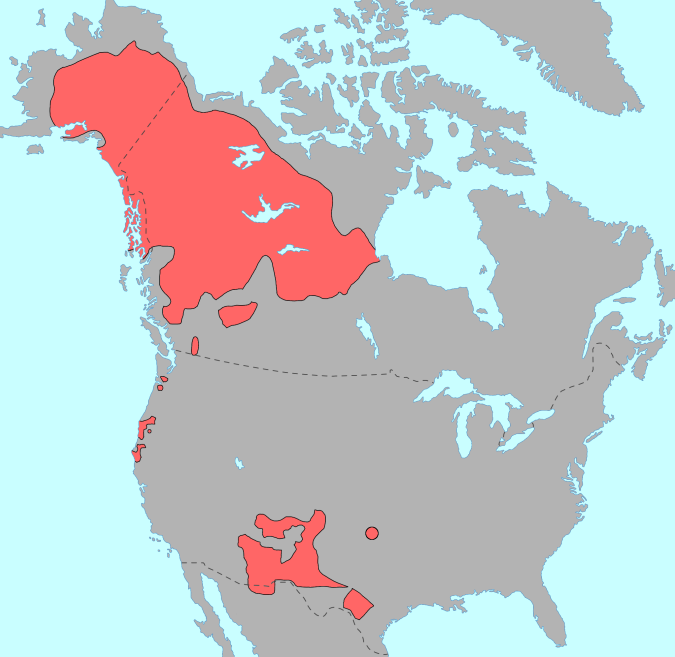
Pre-contact distribution of Na-Dené languages

The Athabaskan language family is divided into the Northern Athabaskan, Pacific Coast Athabaskan and Southern Athabaskan groups. The full Bible has been translated into two Athabaskan languages, and the complete New Testament in five more. Another five have portions of the Bible translated into them. There are no Pacific Coast Athabaskan languages with portions of the Bible translated into them.

== Northern Athabaskan group ==
=== Beaver/Tsattine ===
Mark was translated by Alfred C. Garrioch and published in 1886 by the Society for Promoting Christian Knowledge. A new translation/revision of Mark by Marshal and Jean Holdstock was published by the Canadian Home Bible League in 1976.

Translation	Mark 3:35
Garrioch 1886	Attune zon kooh ghawoteassi ayi Nagha Tgha indi, ayi akye chu, ustye chu, unne chu.

=== Carrier ===
The Wycliffe Bible Translators affiliated Carrier Bible Translation Committee translated the whole New Testament into the Nak'albun/Dzinghubun dialect. This was published by the International Bible Society in 1995 as Yak'usda Ooghuni: 'Andidi Khuni Neba Lhaidinla-i. A second edition came out (at least electronically) in 2011 (this was published by Wycliffe Bible Translators)

They then worked on a Ulkatcho (Blackwater) dialect adaption, which was printed by Wycliffe Bible Translators in 2002 as Yak'usda Bughunek: K'andit Khunek Neba Lhaidinla.

Mark's gospel was translated by Henry and Barbara Hilderbrandt into Northern Carrier/Babine. This was published by the Canadian Home Bible League in 1978.

Translation	John 3:16
Wycliffe 2011	Yakꞌusda ndi yun kꞌut dunene bukꞌentsiꞌ kꞌet ꞌaw ꞌilhoghun duYeꞌ ꞌen bugha ínilhti. Mbene la ꞌen ghun ooba ꞌalhaꞌ yintꞌohne ꞌaw dalhótisa, ꞌilhiz wheni hukhutinalh.

=== Dene Suline/Chipewyan ===
In the Chipewyan, or Dene Suline language, of central Canada William West Kirkby's translation of the Gospels appeared in 1878 and the whole New Testament in 1881. Henry Faraud may, at least in the beginning, also been involved with this translation.

Translation	John 3:16
Kirby 1881	ᓂᐅᐟᘚ ᐁᔨ ᐅᑫᓯ ᓂ ᐅᖢᓂᐁᕦ ᓂ ᐁᔨᕦ ᕞᔭᓯ ᓅᖢᓂᐟᕠ ᓂ ᐃᐢᕍᑑᓂ ᑰᕄ ᔦᑌᖉ ᓂᑌ ᐁᑎᐢᕠ ᐅᐟᘚ ᐗᕄ ᐃᕃ ᣮ, ᐃᒢᕍᓯ ᖠᓇ ᣮ ᐅᑲ,
Kirby 1881 latin transcription	Nioltzi eyi okesi ni oganieta ni eyita teyasi nooganilti ni isladooni kooli yedekla nide edisti oltzi wali ile chu, ithlasi gena chu oka,

=== Deg Xinag ===
Hab. ii. 20., Psa. cxxii. 1., Psa. xix. 14, 15., Phil. i. 2., St. Matt. iii. 2., Isa. xl. 3., St. Luke ii. 10, 11., Psa. li. 3., Psa. li. 9., St. Luke xv. 18, 19., II. Cor. xiii. 14. and the Lord's prayer were translated into Deg Xinag by John Wight Chapman, Paul Hasyan and Isaac Fisher and printed in an Anglican prayer book "Order for daily Morning Prayer," in 1896.

=== Dogrib ===
The New Testament and Genesis have been translated into Dogrib.

Wycliffe Bible Translators has had teams working in Canada's Dogrib language off and on since the 1960s. Jaap and Morine Feenstra, the fourth team on the project, began to work on the Dogrib project in 1985. Wycliffe Bible Translators Vic and Anita Monus joined them later. The entire New Testament was drafted, community checked and rechecked by a consultant between 1995 and 2000. The translation team (including Mary Louise Bouvier White, Elizabeth Mackenzie, Mary Siemens, and perhaps others) was headed by Jaap Feenstra of Wycliffe Bible Translators. The complete New Testament in Dogrib (Nǫhtsı̨ Nı̨htł'è, Zezì wegǫ̀hlı̨ tł'axǫǫ̀) was dedicated on August 23, 2003 in Rae, Northwest Territories.

Translation	John 3:16
WBT, 2003	"Nǫ̀htsı̨ dıı nèk'e dǫ hazǫǫ̀ sıì goghǫneètǫ t'à, edeza ı̨łàet'ee dǫ tł'aàyı̨̀ı̨htı̨. Amı̀ı ehkw'ı adı yı̨ı̨hwhǫǫ sı̀ı wedıhołè ha-le, welǫ whı̀le ts'ǫ̀ eda ha.

=== Gwichʼin ===
The first portions of the Bible available in Gwichʼin language (Athabaskan language family) of Canada was the Gospels and 1-3 John. This was translated by Archdeacon Robert McDonald of the Church Missionary Society in 1874. The whole New Testament, also McDonald's translation, was printed in 1884. In 1886, he proceeded with the Old Testament. A small edition of Genesis, Exodus and Leviticus was published in 1890 by Archdeacon (afterwards Bishop) Reeve, and the Pentateuch was completed in 1891. In 1892 Joshua to Ruth, edited by Rev. C. G. Wallis (C.M.S.), was published, and in 1895 1'st Samuel was added. In 1897 the whole Bible was in the press under the care of McDonald, but owing to delay in communication printing only reached Job in 1898, when McDonald came home to see it through. First consignment of 100 Bibles, 100 Old Testaments, and 100 New Testaments were shipped to Bishop Bompas in February 1899, and the rest of the edition was taken with him by Archdeacon McDonald on his return in the same year. A corrected edition of the New Testament, prepared by C.E. Whittaker and B. Totty was published by the British and Foreign Bible Society in 1920. Richard J. Mueller, from Wycliffe Bible Translators produced a modern translation of Acts. Meggie and Pierre DeMers (also from Wycliffe) continued Mueller's work, and together with Mary Rose Gamboa, Katherine Peter, David Salmon, Judy Erick, Fannie Gimmel, Addie Shewfelt and Ethel Simple completed the translation of the New Testament. This was published as ""Vit'eegwijyahchy'aa: Vagwandak Nizii" in 2011.

Translation	John 3:16
McDonald (BFBS 1898)	Kwuggut yoo kwikkit Vittekwichanchyo nunhkug kettinizhin, tit Tinji ettetvirzị ettiyin kwuntlanttshị, chootin te yik kinjizhit rsyetetgititelya kkwa kenjit, kọ sheg kwundui tettiya.
1920 Corrected Edition	Kwuggut yoo kwikit Vittekwichanchyo nunhkug ketinizhin, ti Tinji etetvirzị etiyin kwuntlantshị, chootin te yi kinjizhit rsyetetgititelya kkwa kenjit, kọ sheg kwundui tetiya.
2011 Wycliffe	Vit'eegwijyąhchy'aa łyaa dinjii datthak eet'iindhan geenjit it'ee zhrįh Didinji' gwantł'ąhchįį ąįįts'ą' juu yik'injiighit nąįį nigiheedhaa kwaa ts'ą' khit gwigweheendaii eenjit.

=== Koyukon ===
Crispinus Rossi translated parts of the Old and New Testaments into Koyukon, the manuscripts however were never published. Jules Jette also translated selections from the Old and New Testaments into Koyukon, but they were also never published. Copies of both the Rossi and Jette manuscripts are available at the Alaska Native Language Center archive. Jules L. Prevost translated selections of the book of Common Prayer, which includes many Bible verses.

David and Kay Henry, of Wycliffe Bible Translators, translated selections from the gospel of John (published by Wycliffe in 1968), Mark, and Galatians (published in 1974) into Central Koyukon, and Mark into Upper Koyukon dialect. Eliza Jones was working with them for at least some of the translations.

Translation	John 3:16
Wycliffe 1968	"Go Dinaahoto' hałdi go nin' kkokk'a hot'aana kkaa ditłiga tł'eegho ghonitsin'. Eedahaan gheelgo didin'aa' nin' kkokk'a neeneełtaanee. Go eeda' zo dibaa ee boho aaditogha deeyeet'aayee neetołdlilaa dahoon yagga donł oda hotoniy ts'o hoyaan'."

=== Slavey/Hare ===
William C. Bompas's translation of 1'st John was published in 1855. Mark was published in 1874. The four gospels were published in 1883 in a Latin script by the British and Foreign Bible Society. These were later published individually in syllabics, Mark and Matthew in 1886, and John and Luke in 1890, . His translation of the rest of the New Testament, transliterated into syllabics by William D. Reeve was published in 1891 by the British and Foreign Bible Society.

The Canadian Bible Society published a new translation of the gospel of John in 1972, followed by Mark in 1973. These books were translated by Philip G. Howard.

Translation	John 3:16
BFBS 1883	Tta ekaonte Niotsi nun goinieto, te Yazi thligi yi koganiti, tene oyi yekeinithet, tsiadothet ka ile, ithlasi kondi katheo olili.
BFBS 1890	ᒡᕦ ᐁᑲᐅᐣᕞ ᓂᐅᘚ ᓅᐣ ᘛᐃᓂᐁᕤ, ᕞ ᔭᓯ ᒢᕄᘗ ᔨ ᑯᘚᓂᕠ, ᕞᓀ ᐅᔨ ᔦᑫᐃᓂᒉᒡ, ᘚᐊᑐᒉᒡ ᑲ ᐃᕃ, ᐃᒢᕍᓯ ᑯᐣᑎ ᑲᒉᐅ ᐅᕄᕄ.

=== Tahltan ===
T. Thorman translated some passages from the Bible. They were never published, and the only extant copy is a hand-written notebook that is owned by the Archives of British Columbia. It was completed after 1897 but the exact date is not known.

=== Tanana, Upper ===
Upper Tanana language is part of the Athabaskan language family. Mark's gospel (T'oodiht'aiy Aandeegn' Suu'mark Utneetł'adn Haa') was published in the Upper Tanana language by the American Bible Society in 1966. It was translated by Paul Milanowski and Donald Joe (Both of Wycliffe Bible Translators). 1 Timothy, translated by Paul and Trudy Milanowski was published in 1970 by Wycliffe Bible Translators. Paul Milanowski and Alfred John then translated I and II Thessalonians, I and II Timothy, Titus, and Philemon, which was published together under the title T'oodiht'aiy Aandeegn' in 1972.

=== Chilcotin ===
Mark and Genesis has been translated into Chilcotin.

== Apachean group ==
=== Jicarilla Apache ===
Wycliffe Bible Translators published a book of hymns and Bible verses in 1965.

=== Western Apache ===
Missionary Crusader, Lubbock, Texas published an Apache language translation' of John, James, and 1 John in 1958.

After translating the Navajo New Testament (1956), Faye Edgerton learned Apache, and together with Faith Hill, and the Apache's Celena Perry, Britton Goode, Johnson Ethelbah, and Happy Moses, translated the New Testament into the Western Apache language. The Apache New Testament was completed, and presented to President Johnson in 1966.

Translation	John 3:16
Wycliffe 1966	Bik'ehgo'ihi'ṉań ni'gosdzáń biká' nṉee dázhǫ́ bił daanzhǫǫhíí bighą biYe' dała'áhi yaa yinłtįį, áík'ehgo dahadíń bosdląądihíí doo da'íl´įį hileeh da, áídá' ihi'ṉaa doo ngonel'ąą dahíí yee hiṉaa doleeł.

=== Navajo ===
Leonard P. Brink, a Christian Reformed missionary working at Rehoboth, New Mexico, translated the first portions of the Bible into Navajo. His translations of Genesis and Mark were published by the American Bible Society in 1910. Presbyterian missionaries John Butler, Alexander Black and F.G. Mitchell translated short portions, and in 1917 after collaborative work the American Bible Society published in one volume portions from Genesis, Exodus, Psalms, Jonah, Isaiah, Mark, Luke, John, Romans, First Corinthians, and Revelation, as God Bîzad. In 1937 Acts was added, and it was republished as "God Bizaad" (God's Word)

Work only began in earnest, however, when Faye Edgerton joined Wycliffe Bible Translators in 1944. She and Geronimo Martin revised the older translations, and completed most of the New Testament. The Corinthian epistles were translated by William Goudberg and Jacob Kamps of the Christian Reformed Church. The New Testament was published in 1956, and became an instant bestseller among the tribe. The complete Bible, under the name Diyin God Bizaad, was printed for the first time in 1985. A revision was published by the American Bible Society in 2000.

It uses the borrowed English word "God" for God, together with the Native word "Diyin" ("Holy"), or "Diyinii" ("Holy One"). Thus, the term is not just "God," and not just "Diyin" or "Diyinii," but "Diyin God," as in "Diyin God Bizaad" ("God's Word"). This is equivalent to the earlier title, "God Bizaad" ("God's Word").

Navajo was the sixth Native American language to have the complete Bible translated into it.

Translation	John 3:16
Diyin God Bizaad (2000)	Háálá Diyin God éí nihokáá' dine'é t'áá íiyisí ayóó'ájó'níigo bąą haYe' t'ááłá'í há yizhchínígíí baazhníłtį́, áko t'áá háiida boodlą́ągo baa dzólíhígíí éí doo ádoodįįł da, nidi iiná doo ninít'i'ii bee hólǫ́ǫ dooleeł.
Diyin God Bizaad (1985)	Háálá Diyin God éí nihokáá' dine'é t'áá'íiyisí ayóó'ájó'níigo bąą haYe' t'ááłá'í há yizhchínígíí baazhníłtį́, áko t'áá háiida boodlą́ągo baa dzólíhígíí éí doo ádoodįįł da, ndi iiná doo nińt'i'ii bee hólǫ́ǫ dooleeł.
L. Brink, God Bîzad (1917)	Hálah, God ėi nîhokā dîneh t'ai'yîsi ayoayo'ṅi'go baṅh Bîye't'ała'i bayîżcîn'îgi yėnîłtiṅh, t'a-ḣai'-dah bodlan'îgi ėi do a'dodiṅł dah ṅîdîh hoŀāgo inah hwė hodolėł.

- Online Navajo Bible (form Youversion)

== See also ==
- Bible translations into Native American languages
