= William West Kirkby =

Anglican missionary

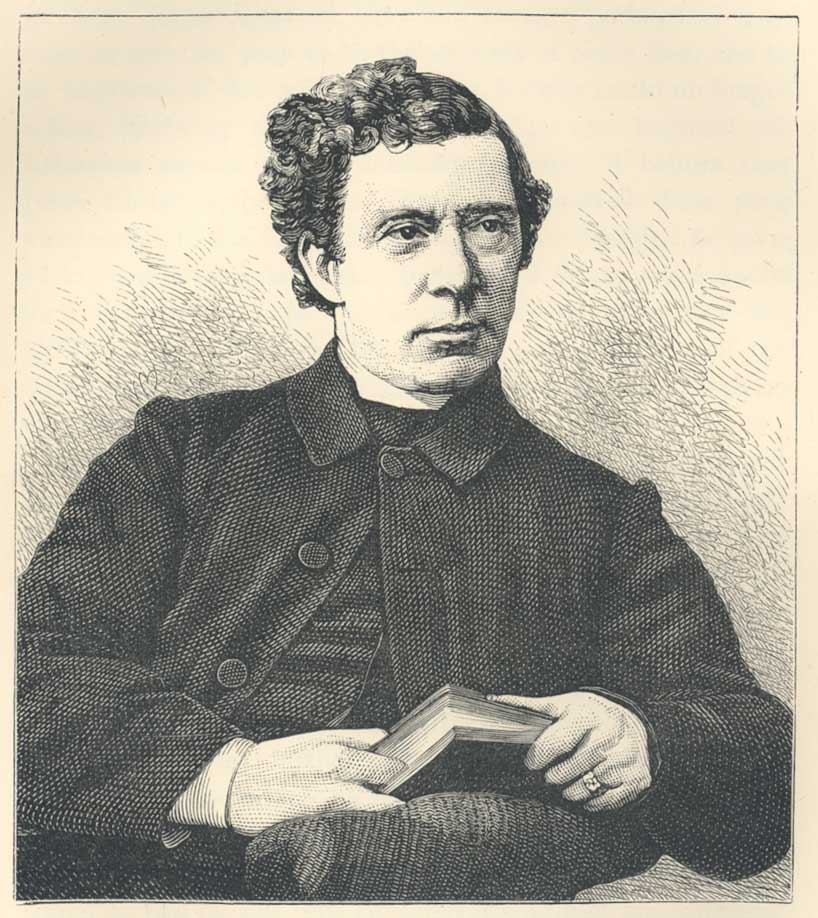

The Venerable William West Kirkby (24 August 1827-September 5, 1907) was an English Anglican clergyman and translator who spent time as a missionary in Northern Canada.

Born in Lincolnshire, he studied at Oxford University and was the first Anglican to preach in the Yukon Territory to the "Loucheux" (Gwich'in people). He was one of the "Northern missionaries" along with Robert McDonald, William Bompas, John W. Ellington and Isaac Stringer and his wife.

He was one of the earliest translators of the Bible into the Athabaskan languages, his New Testament in the Chipewyan language appearing in 1881.

Kirkby later served as Archdeacon of York Factory, Manitoba, on Hudson Bay; Rector of St. Ann's, Brooklyn; and, from 1887 to 1904, Rector of Christ's Church, Rye, New York. He is buried in the Greenwood Union Cemetery in Rye.
