= Max F. Schmittberger =

Maximillian F. Schmittberger
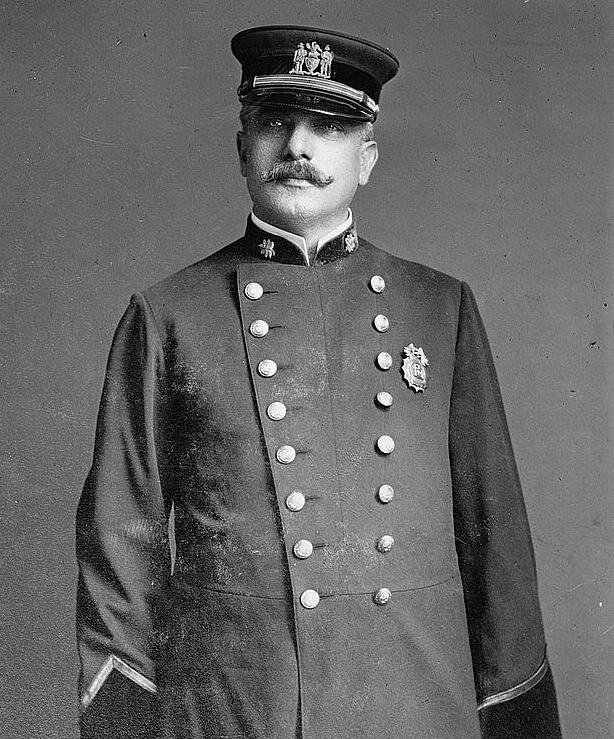
- Born: July 27, 1851; Würzburg, Kingdom of Bavaria
- Died: October 31, 1917 (aged 66); Manhattan, New York, United States
- Resting place: Woodlawn Cemetery
- Occupation: Police inspector
- Known for: Chief police inspector for the New York City Police Department; his testimony before the Lexow Committee helped expose police corruption within the NYPD.
- Spouse: Sarah Golden (m. 1873–1905)
- Children: 8

Maximilian Frances Schmittberger (July 27, 1851 – October 31, 1917) was an American law enforcement officer and chief police inspector for the New York City Police Department from 1909 until his death in 1917. He and Captain John Price were both wardmen closely associated with Inspector Alexander "Clubber" Williams while a precinct captain in the Tenderloin district. Schmittberger later became a star witness testifying before the Lexow Committee on police corruption within the NYPD.

== Biography ==
Schmittberger was born in Würzburg in the Kingdom of Bavaria on July 27, 1851. Four years after his birth, his family emigrated to the United States and settled in New York City. He was educated in public schools and was employed in two or three other occupations prior to joining the Municipal Police Department on January 8, 1874. He reportedly had "a quiet demeanor and dislike of publicity", traits which he held from his days as a patrolman until his last days on the force. He gradually rose through the ranks becoming a roundsman (equivalent to the modern rank of Sergeant) on April 2, 1880, a sergeant (equivalent to the modern rank of Lieutenant) on March 6, 1883, and a captain on December 8, 1890.

He was assigned to the "Broadway squad" during the 1870s and 1880s where he and John Price became closely associated with the then head of the Tenderloin district Captain Alexander "Clubber" Williams. Schmittberger later testified before the Lexow Committee, agreeing to turn state's evidence, and implicated a number of high-level police officials involved in police corruption. Among these officials included Williams, now a police inspector, who Schmittberger claimed he had collected bribe money from gambling resorts and brothels, amounting to between $180–200 a month, then turning the money over to Williams. He also claimed to have carried out similar activity during his involvement with the "steamboat squad" and in other posts. Schmittberger was the only police official to emerge unscathed from the Lexow inquiry; his former colleagues were either allowed to retire or were dismissed from the force, and was called a "squealer" by members of the NYPD.

On May 2, 1903, Schmittberger was finally made a police inspector by Commissioner Francis Greene. He became the technical head of the police force in his later career; he was considered a gifted speaker and an excellent organizer as well as a notoriously strict disciplinarian. He often made unexpected visits to police stations when the patrolman were preparing to go out on duty and watched to see if they saluted the officer at the desk as well as if the desk sergeant returned the salute in the proper manner. If the patrolmen did not salute, Schmittberger would order the officers to salute and then perform the ceremony "in smart military fashion to his satisfaction". On the afternoon of July 31, 1905, his wife Sarah Golden died of cerebral meningitis at her home in Far Rockaway, New York. She had fallen ill earlier that year and was taken to Far Rockaway by her husband so that she might recover. Her funeral was held at St. Mary's Star of the Sea Church and she was interred at Woodlawn Cemetery.

In mid-August 1917, he became ill and received a six-month leave of absence from the force. Although it was presumed his condition was improving, he caught a severe cold two months later after leaving his home. His cold quickly turned into pneumonia and he died at his East 61st Street home on the night of October 31, 1917. His seven children, six sons and one daughter, were at his bedside at the time of his death. Upon news of his death, the flags of all the police stations in New York were ordered to be lowered to half-mast and remained so until his funeral.
