= Fafi =

Gambling game

Fafi or fa-fi (pronounced fah-fee), also known as mo-china, is a form of betting played mainly by black South Africans, particularly those living in townships, and is believed to have originated with South Africa's Chinese community. The game is similar to a numbers racket.

Historically, fafi has functioned as both a form of informal gambling and a mode of community expression in South African townships. The symbolic number system is often passed down orally, reinforcing social ties and shared local mythology. Despite its informal and unregulated nature, fafi has persisted across generations as a subtle form of resistance, hope, and agency within economically marginalized communities.

“Fah-Fee or Fa-Fi, a modification of roulette, is a Chinese game. The meaning of the word Fa-Fi is unknown by those who are interested in the game”. Actually, the name comes from Cantonese Chinese faa wui (花會, Mandarin hua hui), also called Chi-Fah (Mandarin zi hua). a popular gambling game in China in the 19th and 20th centuries.

== Playing fafi ==
Fafi participants choose the number they want to gamble on by interpreting their dreams. This dream interpretation or conversion is based upon a variety of systems. When they have decided upon their lucky number, participants will then place a bet on their number. A dream about robbers (izigebengu/amasela) may indicate the number 7.

A dream about a white person (umLungu) is the number 1, whereas a dream about the sea could either indicate the number 3 for a ship (inqanawe) or 26, the number for water (amanzi). The game requires a woman runner (isikhwama — bag) to take a bag of bets, along with the names of the betters and their money, to someone, usually Chinese, who visits the station (house) of the runner holding the betting session. The Chinese person will take the bag from the runner and then whisper the winning number to her. The runner will then indicate with her hands to the betters which number has won, and that person will be paid out.
