= Alexander S. Williams =

American police officer

Alexander Williams
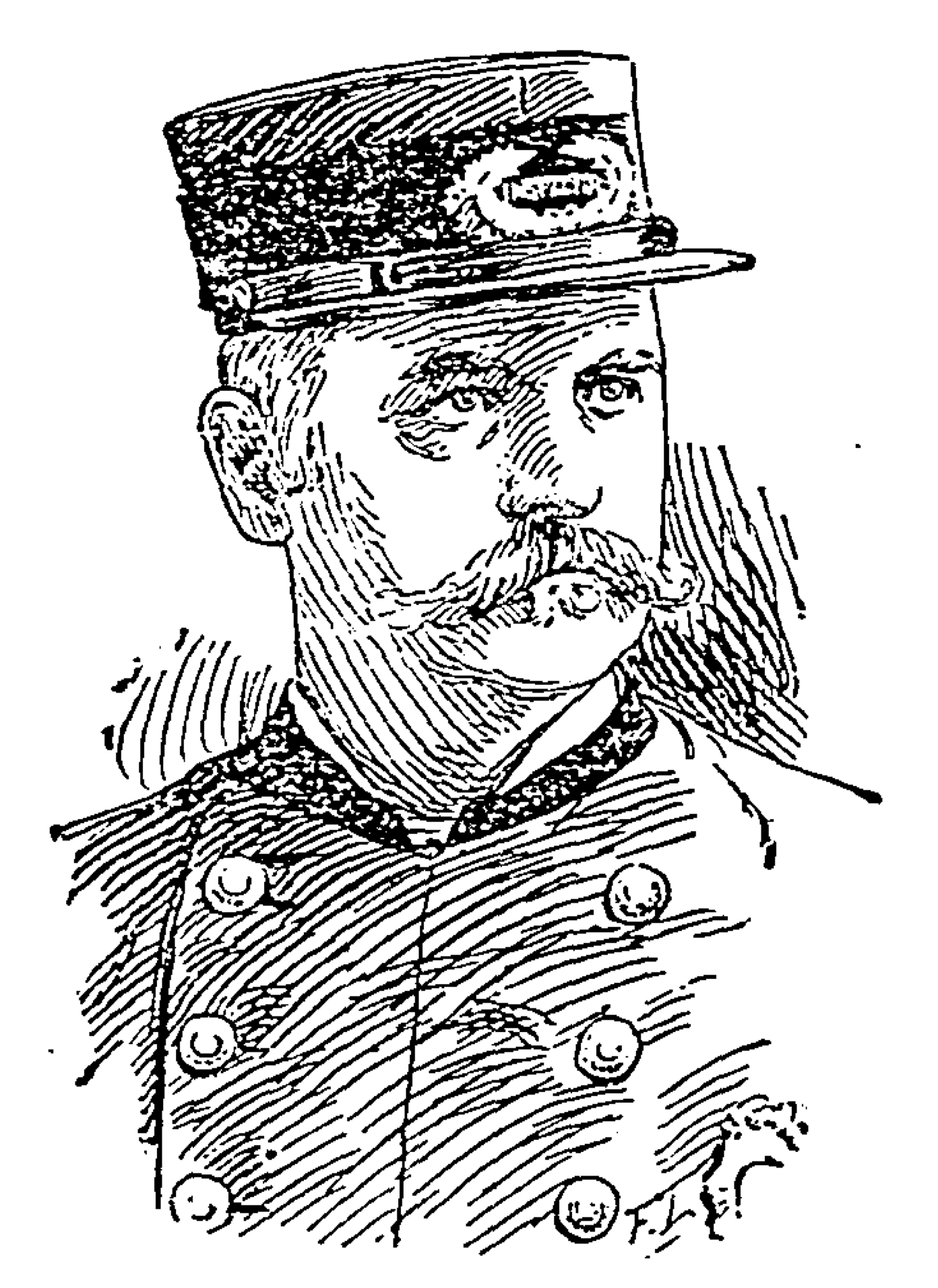
- Born: July 9, 1839; Cape Breton, Nova Scotia, Canada
- Died: March 25, 1917 (aged 77); Manhattan, New York, United States
- Resting place: Woodlawn Cemetery
- Other names: Alex Williams; Clubber Williams; Czar of the Tenderloin
- Occupation: Police officer
- Employer: New York City Police Department
- Known for: NYPD police inspector in charge of the Tenderloin and Gas House districts during the 1870s and 1880s; one of several police officials implicated of corruption by the Lexow Committee.
- Children: 2 sons

Alexander S. Williams (July 9, 1839 – March 25, 1917) was an American law enforcement officer and police inspector for the New York City Police Department. One of the more colorful yet controversial figures of the NYPD, popularly known as "Clubber Williams" or "Czar of the Tenderloin", he oversaw the Tenderloin and Gas House districts as well as breaking up a number of the city's street gangs, most notably, the Gas House Gang in 1871. He, along with William "Big Bill" Devery and Thomas F. Byrnes, were among several senior NYPD officials implicated by the Lexow Committee during the 1890s.

== Early life ==
Alexander S. Williams was born in Cape Breton, Nova Scotia, Canada on July 9, 1839. His father was a native of Nova Scotia and his mother was Scottish. He emigrated to the United States as a child and was apprenticed as a ship's carpenter for the New York-based shipbuilding firm W.H. Webb & Co. for several years. As a young man, he visited several countries including Mexico and Japan among others. He was reportedly the first Westerner to lay the keel of a sailing ship in Japan. Returning to the United States, he was employed by the government and was engaged in raising a sunken ship off the coast of Florida.

== First years with the NYPD ==
Williams officially joined the New York Police Department on August 23, 1866. According to popular lore, Williams originally approached NYPD Police Commissioner John Bergen at the Metropolitan Police Headquarters to personally request a commission as a patrolman. Bergen however, without any way to confirm his identity, pointed this fact out remarking that "You may be a convict from Sing Sing for all I know". Williams angrily told the commissioner he could keep the job and stormed out of his office. Impressed with Williams show of force, he sent for Williams to be brought back and was immediately given a position as a patrolman.

His first post was at the 47th Precinct in Brooklyn where he remained until 1868 when he was transferred to Broadway, then a dangerous and high-crime area, commonly known as "a district infested with crooks and thugs of all description". Williams quickly gained a reputation as a fearsome fighter, in a time when several police officers had been carried off in ambulances during their beat, and eventually became known as "Clubber Williams". Two days after his arrival in the Houston Street area, he picked a fight with two local toughs and attacked them single-handed. Knocking them both unconscious with his club, the fight ended when he threw both of them through a plate glass window from the Florence Saloon. In his first three years in the district, it was said that "it was a dull day that did not find him with at least one row in his hands". He was made a roundsman on July 10, 1871, and then appointed to sergeant on September 23 whereupon he was assigned to lead the then newly formed "mounted squad".

== Gas House and the Tenderloin districts ==
On May 31, 1872, Williams became the precinct captain of the East 35th Street Station, then located in the infamous Gas House district, where he led a "strong arm squad" into the district and was successful in breaking up the Gas House Gang. He spent the next three years in other poor high-crime areas using his aggressive "rough-and-ready" policing methods until September 30, 1876, when he was transferred to the West 13th Street Station. The precinct was one of the most important posts in the city, being the center of the Broadway's night clubs, gambling resorts and "disorderly houses". Referring to the increased amount of bribes he would receive for police protection of both legitimate and illegitimate businesses there – especially the many brothels – Williams said, "I've been having chuck steak ever since I've been on the force, and now I'm going to have a bit of tenderloin." The area would later become known as the "Tenderloin district" which was attributed to this remark.

He remained in the Tenderloin for two years, Max F. Schmittberger and James K. Price both serving as his wardmen, and was briefly detailed as Superintendent of Street Cleaning until his return on June 15, 1881. Despite being brought up on charges eighteen times, Williams was always acquitted by the Board of Police Commissioners and remained in charge of the district until his promotion to inspector in August 1887. In response to frequent criticism of excessive force, Williams once said "There is more law in the end of a policeman's nightstick than in a decision of the Supreme Court".

== Lexow Committee inquiry ==
In 1894, a legislative investigation headed by Senator Clarence Lexow was established to investigate corruption within the NYPD. One of the main examinations of the Lexow Committee was Williams' administration in the Tenderloin district. Claims that Williams had received money from gamblers and brothel keepers were supported by testimony from Max Schmittenberger, now a Chief Inspector, who stated before the committee that he himself had collected regular payments and turned it over to Williams.

His involvement in other underworld "interests" were uncovered during the investigation and Williams was called to testify. He claimed that he had acted against some "disorderly houses", but was unable to recall the names or addresses, while he had allowed others to continue operating because they were "fashionable". Among his personal finances and properties included a house at Cos Cob, Connecticut, a yacht and other property. When asked how he had acquired these on a policeman's salary, he answered "I bought real estate in Japan and it has increased in value".

== Retirement and later life ==
In the aftermath of the Lexow investigation, it was widely speculated that Williams would be charged with corruption. Williams was never brought to trial, but a meeting of the three Police Commissioners headed by Theodore Roosevelt on May 24, 1895 decided that Williams would be retired on a yearly pension of $1,750. In the fall, Williams unsuccessfully ran for State Senator in the Twelfth District where he had formerly been an inspector. He later went into the insurance business where he was said to have been very successful.

In 1912, Williams lashed out against Mayor William Jay Gaynor who had used his nickname "Clubber Williams" in a derogatory fashion towards his police record. Williams issued a public statement in defense of his near 30-year career on the force. "Just ask the Mayor if he can point to a single person I ever clubbed that did not deserve it. He can't name one and he knows it".

Williams died at his West 95th Street home on the afternoon of March 25, 1917. He was survived by his wife and two sons, all of whom were with him at the time of his death, and he was buried at Woodlawn Cemetery.
