= Sufi Abdul Hamid =

African-American religious and labor leader, and early African-American convert to Islam

Sufi Abdul Hamid (born Eugene Brown) (January 6, 1903 in Lowell, Massachusetts – July 30, 1938) was an African-American religious and labor leader and was among the first African-American converts to Islam. An admirer of Mufti Amin al-Husseini, he is best known for his role in the early 1930s business boycotts in Harlem that were designed to draw attention to discriminatory employment practices of white, mainly Italian and Jewish, business owners.

== Life ==
=== Religious activism ===
In Chicago, he styled himself Bishop Conshankin, a Buddhist cleric, then moved to New York in 1932, taking up residence in Harlem. Despite converting to Islam, he probably had no connection with the Nation of Islam. He eventually styled himself His Holiness Bishop Amiru Al-Mu-Minin Sufi A. Hamid, and his press man claimed that he had been born in Egypt beneath the shadow of a pyramid. He sported a mustache and dressed flamboyantly, wearing a Nazi-style military shirt, gold-lined cape, purple turban, and a dagger in his belt.

During the Great Depression, unemployment among black people in Harlem reached 50%. Hamid initiated an effort to encourage white and Jewish business owners in Harlem to hire black workers, often picketing stores and giving speeches on street corners. Author Claude McKay was a Harlem resident during the period and wrote extensively about Sufi Abdul Hamid and related labor issues and organizing as an informed eyewitness in articles for Nation, Amsterdam News, and New Leader, collected in The Passion of Claude McKay (Schocken, 1973, p. 239–249).

Hamid expressed antisemitic views and support for antisemitic groups and individuals such as Haj Amin al-Husseini, the Grand Mufti of Jerusalem, and openly associated with the German-American Bund, a pro-Nazi organization, and the Christian Front, an anti-Semitic organization. He was acquitted of the charge of trying to drive Jewish shop owners out of Harlem; his organization and others, such as the Harlem Citizens League, claimed they were not picketing Harlem stores because of their Jewish, Greek, or other ownership but because they refused to employ black people.

His union changed names many times, from the Negro Industrial and Clerical Alliance to the Afro-American Federation of Labor. Adam Clayton Powell briefly joined forces with him in labor protests and store boycotts, and broke ranks when his rhetoric moved beyond targeting whites and Jews to light-skinned black people. Violent clashes with rival black unions led to Hamid being arrested for stabbing Hammie Snipes, a former follower of Marcus Garvey who became a Communist labor union organizer; in October 1936, the courts sentenced him to 20 days in prison. Eventually, the courts barred Hamid from picketing, leading him to shift his focus to his mosque, the Universal Holy Temple of Tranquility; there, he dubbed himself a bishop, gaining the new nickname of "the Black Mufti."

Hamid opened up his organization to Jewish members on August 31, 1937. In September 1937, he recanted his antisemitic views, saying he was wrong to have judged Jews based on the actions of a few. He established the Universal Order of Tranquility to unite Jews, Christians, whites and blacks. Hamid claimed that Nazi groups had tried to offer him money to organise a "black legion" against the Jews, but that he refused since "they had no better feeling for me or my people than for the Jews."

=== Marriage and death ===
He married Stephanie St. Clair, who ran Harlem's numbers racket but had since then retired, in July 1936. They signed a contract binding themselves and stipulated portions of their mutual assets together for 99 years. All St. Clair's resources were bound to him and $10,000 of his were placed in a trust for her. The paper signed was not legally enforceable, but Hamid claimed that it was binding by sharia law. According to St. Clair's account, Hamid had approached her in June, asking her to finance a movie he wished to make. She turned him down, and multiples after that instance, but he continued to visit and converse with her. One night, he came to her late at night and proclaimed his love for her, asking for her hand in marriage. St. Clair told him she needed three days to think it over, and eventually accepted.

On January 18, 1938, Hamid was shot on his way to see a lawyer, and St. Clair was charged with the crime. In the trial that followed, St. Clair stated that Hamid was a gambler and often financially broke, trying to convince St. Clair to invest in questionable business propositions to recoup his losses. She also claimed that he kept a mistress, the popular Harlem mystic and fortune-teller Dorothy Matthews, self stylized as "Madame Fu Futtam." She even alleged that Futtam had poisoned her with edible gifts, and worked to gain her trust when she was ill, before going on to borrow money to buy provisions for St. Clair that never materialized. Though Hamid denied the affair, weeks after the court trial and divorce, Futtam and Hamid would get legally married.

On August 1, 1938, Hamid, along with his white pilot, died when Hamid's private airplane ran out of fuel and crashed on Long Island. Hamid had purposely undersupplied his plane with fuel in attempt to convince his followers that the luxury of owning it was mitigated by keeping it low on fuel. His white secretary, Catherine Price, was seriously injured but survived. After his death, his widow attempted to keep the mosque going by claiming nightly visitations by him from beyond the grave; she predicted that he would return in sixty days, which failed to materialize. Today, the site at 103 Morningside Avenue is the home of St. Luke's Baptist Church.

== See also ==
- African-American – Jewish relations
