= F. Norton Goddard =

American activist (1861–1905)

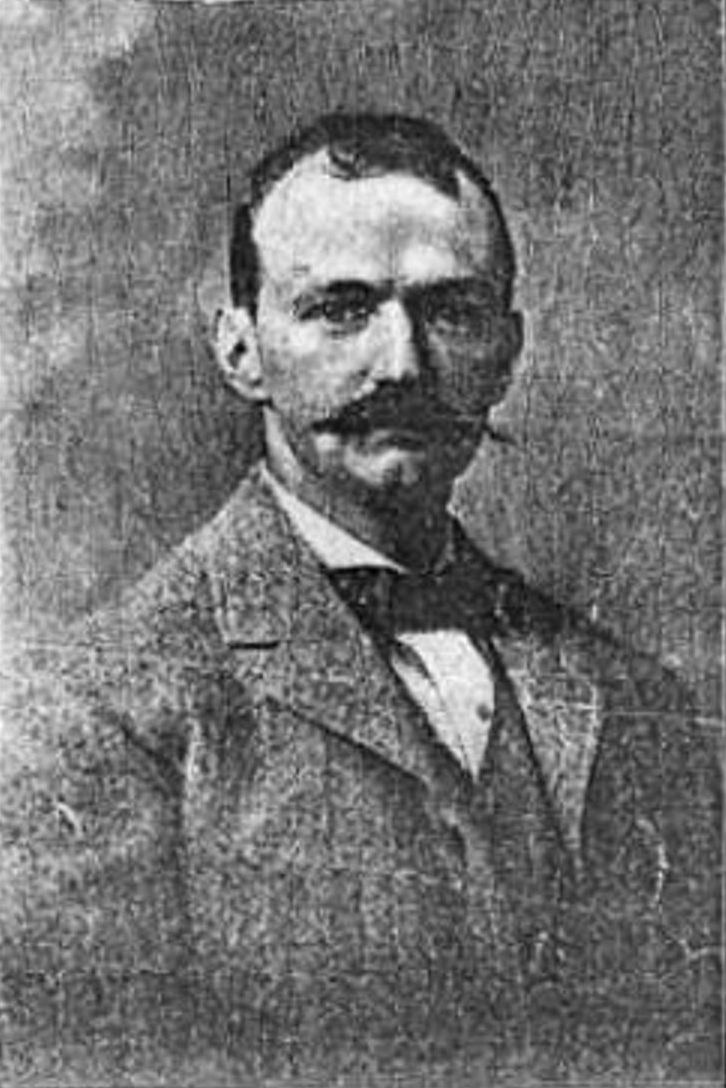
- Born: Frederick Norton Goddard; 1861; New York City, New York, US
- Died: May 28, 1905 (aged 43–44); Litchfield, Connecticut
- Education: Harvard University
- Employer(s): J. W. Goddard and Sons
- Organization(s): Civic Club and Anti-Policy Society
- Known for: fighting against anti-policy laws
- Political party: Republican
- Spouse: Alice Grenville Winthrop (m. 1898)

Frederick Norton Goddard (1861 – May 28, 1905) was an American businessman and anti-poverty and anti-gambling advocate. He was a Republican Party politician from New York City.

== Early life ==
Goddard was born in 1861 in New York City, New York. His father was Joseph Warren Goddard, a wealthy merchant. Goddard was raised in luxury. He attended the Anthon Grammar School.

Goddard attended Harvard University, graduating in 1882. While at Harvard, he was a member of Delta Kappa Epsilon, aka The Dickey Club.

== Career ==
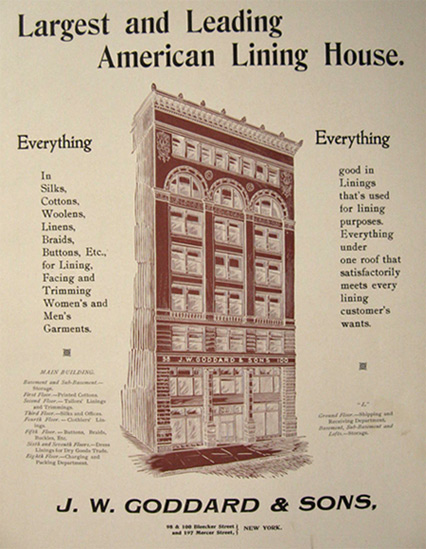
Advertisement for J.W. Goddard & Sons

After college, Goddard then joined his father's business, J. W. Goddard and Sons, a leading purveyor of tailors' trimmings in New York City. After his father's death, he and his brother, Warren Goddard, continued to operate the business. However, Goddard left his family's mansion and rented a floor in a tenement at 327 East 33rd Street. He wanted to "to escape a life that had become irksome".

Goddard established the Civic Club in 1895, providing financial aid and personal service to anyone in need who lived between 23rd and 42nd Streets, from Park Avenue to the East River. In 1898, he hired Thomas A. Gray to design a building for the Civic Club at 243 East 34th Street, paying in full for its construction. He also convinced wealthy businessmen to contribute to the Civic Club and its causes, including improving sanitary conditions, repairing sidewalks, updating plumbing, and ending gambling rackets.

Goddard's most notable accomplishment was forming the Anti-Policy Society, rooting out the policy racket which was an early form of the numbers game in New York City. In 1901, his efforts resulted in the passing of anti-policy laws and the arrest and incarceration of racketeer Albert J. Adams.

Goddard also formed the East Side Republican Club. In 1899, he was elected the district leader for the Republican Party. He resigned from the position after five years. Goddard was a delegate the 1900 Republican National Convention and the 1904 Republican National Convention.

== Personal life ==
When his father died, Goddard inherited $12,000,000 with his brother. He married Alice Grenville Winthrop on November 22, 1898. She was an artist who studied with William Merritt Chase. The couple lived at 273 Lexington Avenue.

Goddard died from a brain hemorrhage at his country home in Litchfield, Connecticut on May 28, 1905. He was 44 years old.
