= The Association for Legalizing American Lotteries =

The Association for Legalizing American Lotteries was an illegal lottery disguised as an organization in 1936.

== History ==
Thomas George Lanphier, Sr. was president. They organized the Grand National Treasure Hunt and sold tickets for $1 disguised as "applications for membership" to circumvent the prohibition on lotteries. The prize for their third lottery was $37,500 (approximately $850,000 today). The United States Post Office charged them with fraud in 1936, the case was appealed in Association for Legalizing American Lotteries v. Goldman, 85 F.2d 67 (United States Court of Appeals for the Second Circuit 1936) and was decided against the association on July 17, 1936.
