= Numbers game =

Form of illegal gambling in the United States

Newspaper clipping declaring the arrest of A. Orlando Jackson, a bookie, for running a numbers game racket, 1881.

The numbers game, also known as the numbers racket, the Italian lottery, Mafia lottery, or the daily number, is a form of illegal gambling or illegal lottery played mostly in poor and working-class neighborhoods in the United States, wherein a bettor attempts to pick three digits to match those that will be randomly drawn the next day. For many years the "number" has been the last three digits of "the handle", the amount race track bettors placed on race day at a major racetrack, published in racing journals and major newspapers in New York. In the loosest sense of the word "racket", the numbers game is a common racket or ongoing criminal scheme among organized crime groups, especially in the U.S.

Gamblers place bets with a bookmaker ("bookie") at a tavern, bar, barber shop, social club, or any other semi-private place that acts as an illegal betting parlor. Runners carry the money and betting slips between the betting parlors and the headquarters, called a numbers bank. Closely related is policy, known as the policy racket, or the policy game. Policy was a popular game, particularly in Italian-American and African-American communities, in cities across the U.S. such as New York (Harlem specifically) and Chicago. The name "policy" is based on the similarity to cheap insurance, which is also a gamble on the future.

== History ==
"Policy shops", where bettors choose numbers, operated in the United States by 1860. In 1875, a report of a select committee of the New York State Assembly stated that "the lowest, meanest, worst form ... [that] gambling takes in the city of New York, is what is known as policy playing". It flourished especially in working-class African-American and Italian-American communities, though it was also played to a lesser extent in many working-class Irish-American and Jewish-American communities. It was known in Cuban-American and Puerto Rican communities as bolita ("little ball").

Other sources date the origin of Policy, at least in its best-known form, to 1885 in Chicago. During part of its run from 1868 to 1892, the Louisiana Lottery involved drawing several numbers from 1 to 78, with bettors choosing numbers on which to bet. Initially, it instead ran by means of the sale of serially numbered tickets, and at another point, the numbers drawn ran from 1 to 75.

By the early 20th century, the game was associated with poor and working-class communities, as it could be played for as little as a penny. Also, unlike state lotteries, bookies could extend credit to the bettors and policy winners could avoid paying income tax. Different policy banks would offer different rates, although a payoff of 600 to 1 was typical. Since the odds of winning were 999:1 against the bettors, the expected profit for racketeers was enormous.

=== Boston ===
In Boston (as well as elsewhere in the Northeast), the game was commonly called "nigger pool", including in the city's newspapers, due to the game's popularity in black neighborhoods. The number was based on the handle from the early races at Suffolk Downs or, if Suffolk was closed, one of the racetracks in New York. The winner could be controlled by manipulating the handle. After Jerry Angiulo became head of the Mafia in Boston, in 1950, he established a profit-sharing plan whereby for every four numbers a runner turned in, they would get one for free. This resulted in the numbers game taking off in Boston. According to Howie Carr, The Boston American stayed in business in part because it published the daily number.

During the 1950s, Wimpy and Walter Bennett ran a numbers ring in Boston's Roxbury neighborhood. The Bennetts' protégé Stephen Flemmi took and collected bets for them. Around the same time, Buddy McLean began forming a gang in Somerville, Massachusetts to, among other criminal activities, run numbers. This became the Winter Hill Gang. By the 1970s, the Winter Hill Gang, then led by Whitey Bulger, moved bookies under its protection away from the numbers game to sports betting, as the state was starting its own lottery. Despite the creation of the state lottery, the numbers game's demise in Massachusetts was not immediate, as the state lottery had a lower payout and was taxed.

=== Chicago ===
The policy game had been active in Chicago decades before Prohibition, by the 1840s. In the 1890s, Samuel Young, known as "Policy Sam", is reputed to have first introduced the game to Chicago's African American community, where it grew in popularity. Patsy King emerged in the late 1890s as the premier purveyor of Chicago's policy racket, running the city's largest policy wheels, the Frankfort and Kentucky, among others. Local aldermen John "Bath house" Coughlin and Michael "Hinky Dink" Kenna ran the North Side policy wheels.

In the early 1900s, several African American pastors spoke out strongly against the pervasive policy racket in their community. The policy syndicate responded by bombing the church on Dearborn & 38th St. in 1903. In 1905 the Illinois state legislature passed a bill that extended penalties to both policy bookmakers and the players. This had a strong effect on Chicago's policy racket, leaving only two wheels operating by 1907 (with roughly 300 shops to operate them). Leading up to Prohibition, the policy syndicate in the African American community was run by Henry "Teenan" Jones, whose reach extended into the primarily white neighborhood of Hyde Park.

In the 1940s, Eddie Jones and his brothers earned more than $180,000 per week in the black community. While in jail for income tax evasion, Jones became acquainted with Sam Giancana, a hit man for hire among top Italian Mafia figures. Back on the streets, the men became friends. Jones taught Giancana everything he knew about the policy game and how to memorize number combinations, and even hired Giancana to operate one of his establishments. Giancana made his first fortune through Jones. Aspiring to become a "made man", Giancana shared his knowledge of the policy game with the Dons, who were impressed. The Italian Mafia then focused their attention on the Jones market in the black community. Under orders from the Dons, Giancana removed Jones from his position and took over. To avoid being murdered by the mob, Jones walked away from his enterprise.

=== Detroit ===
A 1941 trial exposed Detroit's extensive numbers operations. Among the policy houses operating were "Big Four Mutuale" (owned by John Roxborough, boxer Joe Louis's manager), "Yellow Dog" (owned by Everett Watson), "Tia Juana", "Interstate", "Mexico and Villa" (operated by Louis Weisberg), "New York", and "Michigan". Big Four was said in testimony to be doing $800,000 business a year, with profits of up to $6,000 a week. Yellow Dog was said to be doing $4,900 daily in business, totaling $1.5 million annually. The grand jury in a trial of 71 defendants charged that 10 policy houses had been paying $600 a month equally divided between the chief of police, the head prosecutor, and the mayor, with smaller bribes in the $25 to $50 range to police sergeants and lieutenants. Former mayor Richard Reading was said to have received $18,000 in payoffs. Reading, Roxborough, Watson, and several others were convicted on conspiracy charges, with Roxborough receiving a 2 1/2- to 5-year sentence and Reading sentenced to four to five years.

=== Cleveland ===
Benny Mason of the "B&M" policy house and Buster Mathews of the "Goldfield" policy house were the main kingpins of the numbers game in 1930s and 1940s Cleveland. In a 1935 raid on the B&M house on E. 46th St., police found 200 policy writers on hand who had handed in their books and were waiting for the payoff. In a 1949 arrest, police picked up a 35-year-old woman named Robinson who told them she had been a policy writer for the past month and a half, at $40 a week. She was writing slips for the Old Kentucky, Goldfield, and Last Chance games, and her top sheet showed she had written $500 in business that day (which happened to be Good Friday) alone.

By the 1950s, eight rival numbers games operated in black sections of Cleveland, including "California Gold", "Mound Bayou" and "T. & O." The winning three-digit number from 000 to 999 was determined by the closing stock market results in the evening papers, with one digit each being taken from the totals for advances, declines, and unchanged. Bets of up to $2 would be placed with hundreds of numbers writers around the city, who would keep 25% of the money bet as their fee. In the mid-afternoon a runner (locally known as the pickup man or woman) rendezvoused with the writers to collect the policy slips and cash, which were taken to a central location and totaled on adding machines before determining the winners. The runners kept 10% of the money bet as their fee. 65 cents on every dollar bet would be delivered to the "clearinghouse" parlors, which calculated the winners and paid off at 500 to 1 odds, keeping 15 cents on the dollar, on an average day when no "hot" number hit, for themselves. In the evening the runner made the rounds again to deliver the cash winnings to those writers whose customers had hit the winning number, and winners were paid. Several bars, private clubs, and taverns around town, including the "Tia Juana", served as centers of the action where bettors and writers congregated and waited for the winners to be announced.

After a 1955 car bombing in which the girlfriend of Arthur "Little Brother" Drake was killed, police rounded up 28 numbers operators and runners on the east side, including Drake, Geech Bell, Don King, Edward Keeling, Dan Boone, and Thomas Turk. In 1956, Jewish gangster Shon Birns tried to keep the peace by setting up a 5-member syndicate of Cleveland's leading black operators, including Don King, Virgil Ogletree, Boone, and Keeling to control the game, insure payouts when "hot" numbers which had been overbet hit for large scores, and limit the payoff odds to 500 to 1; Birns also attempted to introduce a new method of determining the winning number. The game was wildly popular; in the 1950s one Cleveland numbers house was said to clear $20,000 a day.

=== Atlanta ===
In Atlanta the game was known as "playing the bug." In 1936 The Atlanta Constitution wrote: "Both in the business section and the residential areas, one or more solicitors make their daily morning rounds into every office and every home. Then, in the afternoons, the 'pay-off' men make their rounds over the same routes. Their patrons include every class of Atlanta citizens—professional men, businessmen, housewives, and even children." "The bug" was believed by police to be grossing citywide as much as $30,000 in bets a day at its height in 1937–1938. During a police crackdown in 1943, authorities claimed that the game was in decline and "they are lucky if they bank as much as $12,000 to $15,000 a day", after a raid on an alleged headquarters on Parsons Street. In 1944, eight bug rings were believed to be operating in the city, collectively handling a total of $15,000 to $20,000 in bets on an average day. Writers took out a 25% commission before passing on the rest of the day's receipts to the house.

Bug writers employed a number of schemes to foil police: in 1936 police observed writers carrying the day's bet slips gathering under the bridge that passes over the railroad tracks at Nelson St. As lottery squad officers watched, a pick-up car pulled up and stopped on the bridge overhead, the writers threw their paper sacks full of bet slips up to it, and the car sped off. In 1937 indictments were brought against the alleged "big shots" of the bug game in Atlanta, including Bob Hogg, the Hall brothers (Albert and Leonard), Flem King, Willie Carter, Walter Cutcliffe, Glenn House, and Henry F. Shorter. Shorter was a barber who ran the game out of his barbershop. In 1944, he was one of a select group of 20 African-American community leaders who were turned away from the polls when they attempted to vote in the Democratic primary; the Rev. M.L. King, father of Martin Luther King Jr., was among the others who participated in this protest.

=== Bahamas ===
Numbers games are popular in many Bahamian communities. While gambling in casinos is legal for tourists visiting the Bahamas, it is forbidden for Bahamian residents. There is also no legalized lottery for Bahamian nationals. As a result, the predominant form of gambling among residents is playing the Numbers.

=== New York City ===
The Italian lottery was operated as a racket for the American Mafia, originally in Italian-American neighborhoods such as Little Italy, Manhattan and Italian Harlem by mobsters of the Morello crime family. A young Joseph Bonanno, future boss of the Bonanno crime family, expanded the Italian lottery operation to all of Brooklyn and invested the profits in many legitimate businesses. In the 1930s, Vito Genovese, crime boss of the Genovese crime family, ruled the Italian lottery in New York and New Jersey, bringing in over $1 million per year, owned four Greenwich Village nightclubs, a dog track in Virginia, and other legitimate businesses.

==== Harlem ====
Francis A. J. Ianni, in his book Black Mafia: Ethnic Succession in Organized Crime writes: "By 1925 there were thirty black policy banks in Harlem, several of them large enough to collect bets in an area of twenty city blocks and across three or four avenues." By 1931, big time numbers operators in Harlem included James Warner, Stephanie St. Clair ("Madame Queen"), Casper Holstein, Ellsworth "Bumpy" Johnson, Wilfred Brunder, Jose Miro, Joseph Ison, Masjoe Ison and Simeon Francis. The game survived despite periodic police crackdowns.

=== Legal lotteries ===
Today, many state lotteries offer similar "daily numbers" games, typically relying on mechanical devices to draw the number. The state's rake is typically 50% rather than the 20–40% of the numbers game. The New York Lottery even uses the name "Numbers" for its 3-digit game. Despite the existence of legal alternatives, some gamblers still prefer to play with a bookie for a number of reasons. Among them are the ability to bet on credit, better payoffs, the convenience of calling in one's bet on the telephone, the ability to play if under the legal age, and the avoidance of government taxes.

== Gameplay ==
One of the problems of the early game was to find a way to draw a random number. Initially, winning numbers were set by the daily outcome of a random drawing of numbered balls, or by spinning a "policy wheel" at the headquarters of the local numbers ring. The daily outcomes were publicized by being posted after the draw at the headquarters, and were often "fixed". The existence of rigged games, used to cheat players and drive competitors out of business, as well as the practical obstacles to holding a drawing for an illegal lottery, led to the use of widely published unpredictable numbers, such as the last three numbers in the published daily balance of the United States Treasury or the middle three digits of the number of shares traded on the New York Stock Exchange. In Atlanta, the winning number was determined by the last digit of that day's New York bond sales.

This is what led to the change from the game of policy, in which 12 or 13 numbers from 1 to 78 were drawn, and players bet on combinations of four or fewer of them, to the "numbers game", in which players chose a three-digit number to bet on. The use of a central, independently chosen number allowed gamblers from a larger area to engage in the same game and made larger wins possible. It also gave customers confidence in the fairness of the games, which could still generate vast profits even if run honestly, as they paid out only around $600 for every $1,000 wagered.

When the Treasury began rounding off the balance, many bookies began to use the "mutuel" number. This consisted of the last dollar digit of the daily total handle of the Win, Place and Show bets at a local race track, read from top to bottom. For example, if the daily handle (takings at the racetrack) was:

- Win $1004.25
- Place $583.56
- Show $27.61

then the daily number was 437.

== Policy dealers ==
- Albert J. Adams (1845–1906), operator of policy game in New York City in the 1900s
- Ken Eto (1919–2004), operator of policy game in Chicago
- Giosue Gallucci (1865–1915), operator of Italian policy game in Italian Harlem in the 1910s, known as the King of Little Italy
- Tony Grosso (1913–1994), operator of numbers game in Pittsburgh
- Don King (born 1931), operator of a policy game in Cleveland before achieving fame as a boxing promoter
- Peter H. Matthews, operator of policy game in New York City in the 1900s
- Sai Wing Mock (1879–1941), operator of policy game in Chinatown, New York in the 1900s
- Joseph Vincent Moriarty (1910–1979), operator of numbers game in Hudson County, New Jersey in the 1950s
- Abe Sarkis (1913–1991), operator of numbers game in Boston
- Dutch Schultz (1901–1935), had a gang war with Stephanie St. Clair and Bumpy Johnson over the numbers racket in the 1930s
- Nicholas (Iggy) Vaccaro, Mafia associate of the Patriarca crime family Boston faction and operator of numbers policy game in Boston under family underboss Gennaro Angiulo in the 1970s
- Stephanie St. Clair (1886–1969), known as "Madame Queen", operator of policy game in Harlem, in the 1920s and early 1930s

== Policy reformers ==
- Lexow Committee, uncovered illegal gambling in New York City
- Charles Henry Parkhurst
- F. Norton Goddard

== Timeline ==
- 1860 Private lotteries flourish in large cities
- 1894 Lexow Committee investigates
- 1901 Albert J. Adams arrested in New York City
- 1906 Albert J. Adams takes his own life
- 1916 Peter H. Matthews dies in prison
- 1964 New Hampshire starts the first modern US lottery

== See also ==
- The Association for Legalizing American Lotteries
- Bookmaker
- Bolita
- Fafi
- Four Eleven Forty Four
- Jogo do bicho
- Jueteng
