= Lexow Committee =

New York State Senate committee

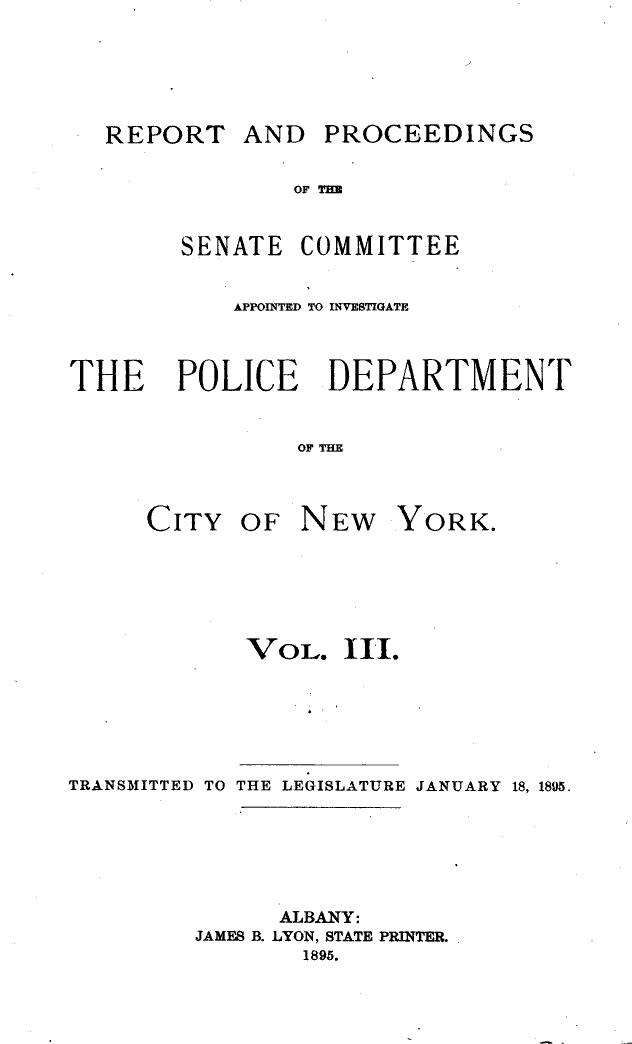
Report and proceedings of the Senate committee appointed to investigate the police department of the city of New York. Volume III

The Lexow Committee (1894 to 1895) was a major New York State Senate probe into police corruption in New York City. The Lexow Committee inquiry, which took its name from the committee's chairman, State Senator Clarence Lexow, was the widest-ranging of several such commissions empaneled during the 19th century. The testimony collected during its hearings ran to over 10,000 pages and the resultant scandal played a major part in the defeat of Tammany Hall in the elections of 1894 and the election of the reform administration of Mayor William L. Strong. The investigations were initiated by pressure from Charles Henry Parkhurst.

== Police ==
Robert C. Kennedy writes:

The Lexow Committee, ironically headquartered at the Tweed Courthouse on Chambers Street, examined evidence from Parkhurst's City Vigilance League, as well as undertook its own investigations. The Lexow Committee uncovered police involvement in extortion, bribery, counterfeiting, voter intimidation, election fraud, brutality, and scams. Attention focused on [William] Devery, then a police captain, who stonewalled before the committee by only responding vaguely to questions: "touchin' on and appertainin' to that matter, I disremember." The state probe and Devery's impudent testimony prodded the police commissioners to clean house. Charged with accepting bribes, Devery feigned illness and his case never reached trial, although he was temporarily demoted.

One newspaper wrote about the hearing that it was "[t]he most detailed accounting of municipal malfeasance in history."

It was discovered that the promotion of officers was largely dependent on the payment for a position, and that that payment was largely recovered from the protection of vice businesses including prostitution. A Captain Timothy J. Creedon describes how he paid $15,000 to obtain a captain's rank. He did not achieve this rank prior to this payment even though his examination score for promotion was a 97.82. Originally, he was quoted a price of $12,000, but his Tammany district leader, John W. Reppenhagen, told Creedon that another officer had already come up with that amount and the new price was $15,000, which Creedon paid. Creedon also revealed that a portion of that cost was paid by local businesses. The committee also revealed that when the police did go after prostitutes, they were largely independent street walkers, and even then, Tammany made a profit with its control of the bail system.

== Impact ==
The boss of Tammany Hall, Richard Croker, left for his European residences for a period of three years at the onset of the committee. A new Committee of Seventy was formed, again largely consisting of upper-class reformers, and in the mayoral election of 1894, Republican William L. Strong won.

== Key participants ==
=== Committee ===
- Clarence Lexow Chairman
- Daniel Bradley Member
- Jacob A. Cantor Member
- Edmund O'Connor Member
- George W. Robertson Member
- John W. Goff, Chief Counsel
- William Travers Jerome, Associate Counsel
- Frank Moss (lawyer), Associate Counsel
- William A. Sutherland, Associate Counsel

=== Police ===
- William "Big Bill" Devery last superintendent of the New York City Police Department police commission and the first police chief in 1898.
- Alexander S. "Clubber" Williams, New York City Police Department Inspector, popularly known as the "Czar of the Tenderloin".
- Thomas F. Byrnes, head of the New York City Police Department detective department from 1880 until 1895
- Max F. Schmittberger, New York City Police Department precinct captain in the Tenderloin district, star witness

=== Social reformer ===
- Charles Henry Parkhurst

=== Policy dealers ===
- Al Adams "Al has the most ... sheets, and he is the biggest man, and has the most money, and has the biggest pile." "He is called the king of the policy dealers." "Al Adams has from Fourteenth street up on the west side mostly."
- Jake Shipsey
- Cornelius P. Parker
- Charles Frederick Lindauer (1836-1921), a.k.a. Charlie Lindauer
- William Meyers a.k.a. Billy Meyers "Billy Meyers is a backer on the east side, around the Hebrew district, and up about as far as Sixth street"
- Edward Hogan a.k.a. Ed Hogan
- Richard Gammon, a.k.a. Dick Gammon
- William Morton a.k.a. Billy Morton "he has mostly down about South and Broad streets."
