= Faye Edgerton =

American Bible translator (1889–1968)

Faye Elva Edgerton
- Born: 26 March 1889; Little Blue Township, Adams County, Nebraska
- Died: 4 March 1968 (aged 78); Farmington, New Mexico
- Occupation: Bible translator

Faye Elva Edgerton (26 March 1889 – 4 March 1968) was a missionary, linguist and Bible translator with Wycliffe Bible Translators. She translated the New Testament into the Navajo and Apache languages, as well as helping some with the Hopi and the Inupiat/Eskimo New Testaments.

== Early life and education ==
Edgerton was born in Nebraska and became a Christian when she was 10 years old. After graduating from high school she went to Chicago to study music. She became very sick there with scarlet fever, and went deaf. She recovered, however, and regained her hearing. After that incident she attended and graduated from Moody Bible Institute. Linguistic training began in 1943 with the Summer Institute of Linguistics taught by Kenneth L. Pike and Eugene A. Nida. Nida personally mentored Edgerton in her early linguistic inquiries. She continued with full-time field work and intensive summer studies with other linguists. In 1958 she participated in a seminar on the Athapaskan languages of North America held in Norman, Oklahoma, under Harry Hoijer. The following year she prepared for publication her findings on the sentence structure in Western Apache. In 1964 she also took part in a translation workshop in Ixmiquilpan, Mexico, with Robert Longacre, who paid tribute to her that year on the occasion of her 75th birthday.

== Korea ==
In 1918 Edgerton set out for Korea, with the American Presbyterian Mission. During her voyage across the Pacific she studied Korean, and by the time she arrived she could read it well. She worked in Chungju, Korea. During the first winter she got severe sinusitis, in the spring of 1919 the terror and violence of the Samil Movement had a toll on her nerves. Edgerton received a lot of encouragement from fellow workers, especially Gerda Bergman, and kept on going. In 1920 she was assigned to her permanent station. By the end of 1922, however, she had to return to America for treatment of a worsening sinus problem. Health would never permit her to return to Korea.

== Navajo New Testament ==
After she arrived back in the United States she spent some time with her father, who was dying. Her father died in December 1923. The Presbyterian board in early 1924 assigned Edgerton to work at a school in Ganado, Arizona, on a Navajo reservation. It was believed that the climate would help her sinus problem, because of her frail health she also wasn't permitted to go far from medical aid, and so Korea wasn't an option.

At the school she noticed that kids weren't allowed to speak Navajo, except for a short time after supper. She learned Navajo however, and increasingly became aware that the Navajo people needed the Bible in their own language. After taking a course at the Summer Institute of Linguistics, she became convinced she could do the work and that God wanted her to.

In 1944 she decided to leave the Presbyterian mission and joined Wycliffe Bible Translators. She and Geronimo Martin revised older translations of Luke, Romans, First Corinthians, Revelation, and Mark and completed the New Testament. It was published in 1956 by the American Bible Society.

It is the largest piece of Navajo literature, and became an instant bestseller among the tribe. This work also resulted in a revival of the Navajo language, that many had previously sought to extinguish.

== Apache New Testament ==
After translating the Navajo New Testament, Edgerton learned Apache, and together with Faith Hill translated the New Testament into the Apache language. The Apache New Testament was presented to President Johnson in 1966.

Manuscripts and translation notes are held at Northern Arizona University. She also helped some with the Hopi and the Inupiat/Eskimo New Testaments.

== Bibliography ==
- Ethel Emily Wallis, God Speaks Navajo: The Moving Story of Faye Edgerton, New York: Harper & Row Publishers (1968)
- Faye Edgerton, "Relative frequency of direct discourse and indirect discourse in Sierra Chontal and Navajo Mark." (1964)
- Faye Edgerton, "The tagmemic analysis of sentence structure in Western Apache." (1963)
- Faye Edgerton, "Some translation problems in Navaho." (1962)
