= James Lanphier =

American actor (1920–1969)

- Lanphier in The Pink Panther (1963)
- Born: 31 August 1920; Hempstead, New York, U.S.
- Died: 11 February 1969 (aged 48); Los Angeles, California, U.S.
- Occupation: Actor
- Years active: 1941–1969
- Father: Thomas George Lanphier Sr.
- Relatives: Thomas George Lanphier Jr. (brother)

James Lanphier (August 31, 1920 — February 11, 1969) was an American actor who did a variety of work for Blake Edwards. He portrayed Saloud in the 1963 film The Pink Panther, and also appeared in films such as Darling Lili (1970) and the television series Peter Gunn (1958–61).

== Biography ==
Lanphier was born at Mitchel Field, New York, to Janet Grant Cobb and Thomas George Lanphier Sr. He had two brothers, Thomas Jr. and Charles.

Lanphier made his stage debut as a juvenile in an army post drama. He debuted on Broadway as a dancer in Mexican Hayride in 1944 and played Mr. Atkins in a production of Dark of the Moon the following year. He began his acting career on American television in 1949, beginning in May with a supporting role in the Colgate Theatre episode, "Tin Pan Skipper", then co-starring the following month with Mary Sinclair and Arnold Moss in Studio One's production of Joseph Liss's English-language TV adaptation of S. Ansky's The Dybbuk.

In 1957 Lanphier made his feature film debut in an uncredited role in The Deadly Mantis (1957). Several other minor roles followed including small roles in Blake Edwards' The Perfect Furlough (1958), Operation Petticoat (1959) and High Time (1960), then two appearances on Edwards' Peter Gunn television series. On the third season of the show Lanphier became a regular where he played Leslie, a gourmet chef and restaurateur.

He played a landlord in Edwards' Experiment in Terror (1962) then acted as a dialogue coach on Edwards' Days of Wine and Roses (1962) and The Pink Panther (1963) where he played Saloud, one of his many roles where he played a Middle Eastern or Indian gentleman. He made minor appearances in more of Edwards' films, including What Did You Do in the War, Daddy? (1966) as an Italian villager, The Party (1968) as Harry, and his final role in Darling Lili (1970) as a Hungarian maître d'hôtel, released after his death.

== Filmography ==
| Year | Title | Role | Notes |
|---|---|---|---|
| 1949 | Studio One | Channon | Ep. "The Dybbuk" |
| 1957 | The Deadly Mantis | Col. Harvey | Uncredited |
| 1958–1961 | Peter Gunn | Leslie / Sloane / Chop | 15 episodes |
| 1958 | The Perfect Furlough | Assistant Hotel Manager | |
| 1958 | Bell Book and Candle | Waldo | Uncredited |
| 1959 | It Happened to Jane | Newspaper Photographer | |
| 1959 | Operation Petticoat | Lt. Cmdr. Daly | Uncredited |
| 1960 | High Time | Burdick, Maitre D' at Harvey Howard's | Uncredited |
| 1961 | Breakfast at Tiffany's | The Cousin | Uncredited |
| 1961 | Flight of the Lost Balloon | Hindu | |
| 1962 | Experiment in Terror | Landlord | |
| 1962 | Days of Wine and Roses | Prince | Uncredited |
| 1963 | The Pink Panther | Saloud | |
| 1964 | Sex and the Single Girl | Salesman | Uncredited |
| 1965 | Perry Mason | Marius Stone | 1 episode |
| 1966 | What Did You Do in the War, Daddy? | Villager | Uncredited |
| 1966 | Gambit | Garage Attendant | Uncredited |
| 1966 | The Time Tunnel | Dubois | Episode 16 "The Revenge of Robin Hood" |
| 1968 | The Party | Harry | |
| 1968 | The Legend of Lylah Clare | 1st Legman | |
| 1970 | Darling Lili | Hungarian Maitre D' with Larrabee | Uncredited, (final film role) |
