= Stephanie St. Clair =

Caribbean-French mobster and community activist (1897–1969)

Stephanie St. Clair

Stephanie St. Clair (December 25, 1887 – December 1969) was a racketeer who ran numerous enterprises in Harlem, New York, in the early 20th century. St. Clair resisted the Mafia's interests for several years after Prohibition ended; she became a local legend for her public denunciations of corrupt police and for resisting Mafia control. She ran a successful numbers game in Harlem and was an activist for the black community. Her nicknames included: Queenie, Madame Queen, Madame St. Clair and Queen of the Policy Rackets.

== Early life ==
Stephanie St. Clair was born of African descent in Guadeloupe, French West Indies to a single mother, Félicienne, who worked hard to send her daughter to school. According to St. Clair's 1924 Declaration of Intention, she gave Moule GrandeTerre, French West Indies (present-day Guadeloupe, West Indies) as her place of birth.

When St. Clair turned 12, her mother became very ill and St. Clair had to leave school. She managed to save some money and, after the death of her mother, left Martinique for Montreal, likely coming as part of the 1910-1911 Caribbean Domestic Scheme, which brought domestic workers to Quebec.

She immigrated to the United States from Montreal, arriving in New York in 1912. She used the voyage and subsequent quarantine to learn English. In Harlem she fell in love with a small-time crook, Duke, who soon tried to prostitute her but was shot in a fight between gangs. After four months, she decided to start her own business, selling controlled drugs with the help of her new boyfriend, Ed.

After a few months, she had made $30,000 and told Ed she wanted to leave him and start her own business. Ed tried to strangle her and she pushed him away with such force that he cracked his skull against a table and died. For months afterwards, she employed her own men, bribed policemen, and on April 12, 1917, invested $10,000 of her own money in a clandestine lottery game in Harlem. As a result of her success running one of the leading numbers games in the city, she became known throughout Manhattan as Queenie, but Harlem residents referred to her as Madame St. Clair.

== Numbers game involvement ==
St. Clair was involved in policy banking, which for her was a mixture of investing, gambling, and playing the lottery. Many banks at this time would not accept black customers, so they were not able to invest legally. Policy banking wasn't legal, but it was one of the few options offered to black Harlem residents who wished to invest their money. It was also a predominantly black industry which allowed many bankers to have a sense of agency that would not be possible in white-dominated fields. In this way, St. Clair used the underground economy in Harlem to address race politics.

At this time, the numbers game in Harlem was male-dominated, and St. Clair was one of the few women involved. She helped the black community in Harlem by providing many with jobs such as numbers runners. Part of the numbers bankers' activity was financing otherwise legitimate small businesses which took players' bets. She also helped her community by donating money to programs that promoted racial progress. Because of her success in the numbers game, she lived a lavish life, making over $20,000 per year in the 1920s.

== Police corruption ==
St. Clair was known to put out ads in the local newspapers educating the Harlem community about their legal rights, advocating for voting rights, and calling out police brutality against the black community. Several times she complained to local authorities about harassment by the police. When they paid no heed, she ran advertisements in Harlem newspapers, accusing senior police officers of corruption.

The police responded by arresting her on a trumped-up charge and she spent eight months in a workhouse. In response, she testified to the Seabury Commission about the kickbacks she had paid police officers and those who had participated in the Harlem numbers game. The commission subsequently fired more than a dozen police officers.

== Conflict with the Mafia ==
After the end of Prohibition, Jewish and Italian-American crime families saw a decrease in profits and decided to move in on the Harlem gambling scene. Bronx-based mob boss Dutch Schultz was the first to move in, beating and killing numbers operators who would not pay him protection.

St. Clair and her chief enforcer Ellsworth "Bumpy" Johnson refused to pay protection to Schultz despite the violence and intimidation by police they faced. St. Clair responded by attacking the storefronts of businesses that ran Dutch Schultz's betting operations and tipping off the police about him. This resulted in the police raiding his house, arresting more than a dozen of his employees and seizing approximately $12 million (about $190.6 million in 2021 currency). St. Clair never submitted to Dutch Schultz, unlike many others in Harlem.

After St. Clair's struggles with Schultz, she had to become legitimate and stay away from the police, so she passed on her criminal business to Johnson. Eventually her former enforcer negotiated with Lucky Luciano, and Lucky took over Schultz's spots, with a percentage going to "Bumpy". The mafiosi then had to go to "Bumpy" first if they had any problems in Harlem. Luciano realized that the war in Harlem was bad for business. Schultz was fatally wounded in a shooting ordered by The Commission in 1935; St. Clair, though uninvolved in the hit, sent an infamous telegram to Schultz on his deathbed that read "As ye sow, so shall ye reap." The telegram reportedly made headlines across the nation. By the 1940s, Johnson had become the reigning king in Harlem, and St. Clair became less and less involved in the numbers game.

== Later life ==
After St. Clair retired from the numbers game, she started a new era of her life as an advocate for political reform. In the late 1930s, she met her husband Sufi Abdul Hamid, an African-American religious and labor leader. Hamid is best known for his role in the early 1930s business boycotts in Harlem that were designed to draw attention to discriminatory employment practices of white, mainly Italian and Jewish, business owners. St. Clair and Hamid's marriage went downhill quickly when he allegedly had an affair with a fortune teller known as "Fu Futtam" (Hamid went on to marry Futtam, whose real name was Dorothy Matthews, in April 1938, and they founded a Buddhist temple together).

The marriage officially ended in January 1938 when St. Clair shot Hamid during a fight over his relationship with Futtam and was sentenced to two to 10 years at the Bedford Hills Correctional Facility for Women in New York. After she was released from prison in the early 1940s, St. Clair lived a secluded life and was reported as having successfully transitioned from underworld figure to a legitimate "prosperous business woman". She continued to write columns in the local newspaper about discrimination, police brutality, illegal search raids, and other issues facing the Black community.

== Death ==
St. Clair died quietly and still wealthy in 1969, shortly before her 72nd birthday. "Bumpy" Johnson, who had come back to live with her and to write poetry, had died one year earlier. However, her death was not mentioned in any newspaper of the era.

== Media ==
Film

- In the 1984 film The Cotton Club, St. Clair is played by Novella Nelson
- In the 1997 film Hoodlum, St. Clair is played by Cicely Tyson

Television

- A character named Madame Queenie is portrayed by Andrea Solonge in the AppleTV series Time Bandits, season 1, episode 4 "Prohibition."
- St. Clair is portrayed by Alexandra Afryea in a 2014 episode of the TV One series Celebrity Crime Files.
- A character named Queeny with a narrative similar to St. Clair was in the CBC/BET series "The Porter". 2022
- "The Booze, Bets and Sex That Built America", 2022 docuseries on the History Channel.

Theater

- Fulani Haynes played St. Clair in a 2007 production of 409 Edgecombe Ave, The House on Sugar Hill by Katherine Butler Jones.

Comic books

- The 2022 comic book series Harlem by Mikaël centers on St. Clair's numbers game racket in the 1930s
- The 2021 graphic novel Queenie, la marraine de Harlem (Queenie: Godmother of Harlem) by Elizabeth Colomba and Aurélie Lévy

Video games

- She appears as a playable character in the strategy game Empire of Sin.
- A caricature of her likeness is featured as a mask the player can wear in the heist themed first person shooter Payday 2.

Board games

- She appears as a playable character as a mob boss running the Black Wolves Gang in the board game Scarface 1920 by Redzen Games.

== See also ==
- List of people from Harlem

Preceded by Peter H. Matthews	Policy racket in New York City; Circa 1923–1932	Succeeded by Dutch Schultz
