= 2014 Huron County municipal elections =

Canadian elections in Ontario on October 27, 2014

Elections took place in Huron County, Ontario on October 27, 2014 in conjunction with municipal elections across the province.

== Huron County Council ==
Huron County Council consists of the Mayors and Reeves of each constituent municipality, plus deputy mayors, deputy reeves for all municipalities except Howick, Morris-Turnberry and North Huron

For the 2014 election, Huron County Council will be reduced from 16 to 15 councillors, with the removal of one council seat from Bluewater.

Position	Elected
Ashfield-Colborne-Wawanosh Reeve	Ben Van Diepenbeek
Ashfield-Colborne-Wawanosh Deputy Reeve	(selected from council)
Bluewater Mayor	Tyler Hessel
Bluewater Deputy Mayor	Jim Fergusson
Central Huron Mayor	Jim L. Ginn (acclaimed)
Central Huron Deputy Mayor	David Jewitt (acclaimed)
Goderich Mayor	Kevin Morrison
Goderich Deputy Mayor	Jim Donnelly
Howick Reeve	Art Versteeg
Huron East Mayor	Bernie MacLellan (acclaimed)
Huron East Deputy Mayor	Joe Steffler (acclaimed)
Morris-Turnberry Mayor	Paul B. Gowing
North Huron Reeve	Neil G. Vincent
South Huron Mayor	Maureen Cole
South Huron Deputy Mayor	David Frayne

== Ashfield-Colborne-Wawanosh ==
Reeve Candidate	Vote	%
Ben Van Diepenbeek (X)	1,609	54.97
Shawn Drennan	1,318	45.03

== Bluewater ==
Mayoral Candidates	Vote	%
Tyler Hessel	1,618	35.20
Paul Klopp	1,268	27.58
Bill Dowson (X)	1,090	23.71
Cindy Moyer	621	13.51

Deputy Mayoral Candidates	Vote	%
Fergusson, Jim	2838	64
Walden, Peter	1616	36

== Central Huron ==
Mayoral Candidate	Vote	%
Jim L. Ginn (X)	Acclaimed	

== Goderich ==
Mayoral Candidates	Vote	%
Kevin Morrison	1,995	57.41
Deb Shewfelt (X)	1,480	42.59

Deputy Mayoral Candidates	Vote	%
Crawford, Judy	629	18
Donnelly, Jim	1480	43
Grace, John (X)	1371	39

Councillor Candidates	Vote	%
Bazinet, Trevor	1535	10.6
Dean, Tom	977	6.7
Elliot, Luke	2073	14.3
Hansen, Michele (X)	1828	12.6
Hoy, Matthew	2023	14.0
Hughes, Nancy J.	1056	7.3
Murdock, Myles	2246	15.5
Rutledge, Jim	1260	8.7
Shelton, Grant Windsor	1483	10.2

== Howick ==
Reeve Candidate	Vote	%
Art Versteeg (X)	752	69.37
Rosemary Rognvaldson	332	30.63

== Huron East ==
Mayoral Candidate	Vote	%
MacLellan, Bernie (X)	Acclaimed	

== Morris-Turnberry ==
Mayoral Candidate	Vote	%
Paul B. Gowing (X)	766	54.13
Jamie McCallum	649	45.87

== North Huron ==
Reeve Candidate	Vote	%
Neil G. Vincent (X)	998	49.21
Bernie Bailey	869	42.85
Steve Hill	161	7.94

== South Huron ==
Mayoral Candidates	Vote	%
Maureen Cole	2,554	61.07
Jim Dietrich	1,628	38.93

Deputy Mayoral Candidates	Vote	%
Frayne, David	1679	41
Robertson, Drew	1387	34
Seip, Cathy	1065	26
