= Thomas George Lanphier Jr. =

United States Army Air Forces officer

- Born: November 27, 1915; Panama City, Panama
- Died: November 26, 1987 (aged 71); La Jolla, California, US
- Resting place: Arlington National Cemetery
- Known for: Mission to shoot down the plane of Admiral Yamamoto
- Spouse: Phyllis Lanphier
- Children: 5
- Parent: Thomas George Lanphier Sr.
- Military career
- Allegiance: United States
- Branch: United States Army Air Forces; United States Air Force (Idaho Air National Guard)
- Service years: 1941–1971
- Rank: Colonel
- Conflicts: World War II: Guadalcanal Campaign; Operation Vengeance

Thomas George Lanphier Jr. (November 27, 1915 – November 26, 1987) was a Panama-born American colonel and fighter pilot during World War II who was first given sole credit, then later partial credit shared with Rex T. Barber, for shooting down the plane carrying Admiral Isoroku Yamamoto, the commander in chief of the Imperial Japanese Navy. Most modern historians discount his version entirely, giving Barber the whole credit for the kill.

== Early life ==
Lanphier was born on November 27, 1915, in Panama City, Panama to Thomas George Lanphier Sr. and the former Janet Grant Cobb. He studied journalism at Stanford University and graduated in January 1941. His younger brother James Lanphier was a longtime film and television actor.

== Personal life ==
Lanphier and his wife Phyllis, of Boise, Idaho, had five daughters: Patricia Lanphier Mix; Judith Lanphier Strada; Janet Lanphier; Kathleen Lanphier; and Phyllis Lanphier

== Military career ==
Lanphier completed his pilot training at Stockton Army Air Field, California on October 30, 1941, and was assigned to the 70th Pursuit Squadron, 35th Pursuit Group at Hamilton Field in Novato, California.

Until December 1942 he served in Fiji then his squadron was moved to Guadalcanal and he joined the 347th Fighter Group. He scored his first aerial victory on Christmas Eve in 1942 when he shot down an A6M Zero. Lanphier was promoted to captain in March 1943. The next month he destroyed three A6M Zeros over Cape Esperance on April 7, 1943. By the end of his tour, he flew 97 combat missions out of Guadalcanal in P-39s and P-38s.

Following World War II, he was one of the founding members of the Idaho Air National Guard, eventually retiring as a Colonel.

=== Yamamoto mission ===
Allied codebreakers determined the route and time schedule of the two Mitsubishi G4M bombers carrying Admiral Yamamoto and his staff by breaking the Purple code and Lanphier was selected for the mission to shoot it down. The mission was a success with both of the "Betty" bombers being destroyed. Officially, the after-action report gave Captain Lanphier and his wingman First Lieutenant Rex T. Barber each half-credit for the kill. While the USAF did not reverse its 1991 decision giving half-credit to each pilot, a retired lawyer / historian and state of Oregon politicians credit Barber with the sole kill. Lanphier's claim does not stand up to the accounts given by every other battle participant including American Lightning pilots Besby Holmes, Doug Canning and Rex Barber, and Japanese Zero pilot Kenji Yanagiya.

Promoted to lieutenant colonel in February 1945, Lanphier served as director of operations of the 72nd Fighter Wing of the Second Air Force until late 1945. Leaving active duty following the war, he transferred to the National Guard which became the Air National Guard with the establishment of the U.S. Air Force as a separate service in 1947. He was promoted to colonel in the Air National Guard with concurrent federal recognition at the same rank in the Air Force in 1950.

== Later life ==
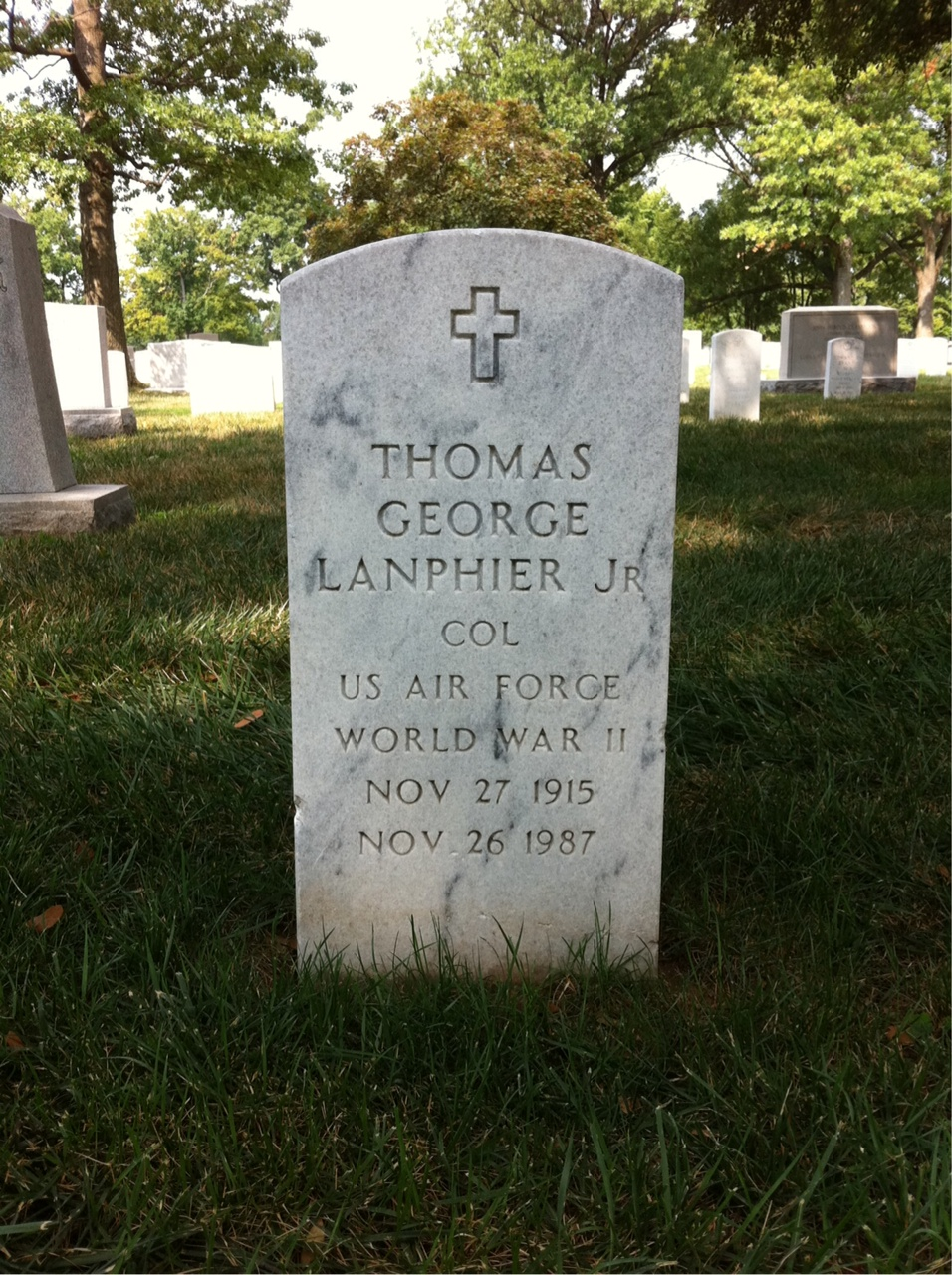
Lanphier's grave at Arlington National Cemetery

After the war he worked as an editor of the Idaho Daily Statesman and the Boise Capital News while continuing to serve as an officer and fighter pilot in the Idaho Air National Guard. He served as president of the Air Force Association from September 1947 to September 1948. In December 1949, to promote the AFA's "airability program", an aviation awareness campaign, Lanphier made a round-the-world flight using scheduled airlines, making the 22,140 mile trip in under five days. He carried with him a letter from President Harry Truman commemorating the 46th anniversary of the first flight of the Wright brothers. Upon returning to New York, the letter, postmarked in 12 countries, was delivered to AFA President Robert S. Johnson, for presentation to the Kill Devil Hills Memorial Association at its annual 17 December anniversary of the Wright's first flight at Kitty Hawk, North Carolina.

He was then appointed special assistant to the Secretary of the Air Force, and then special assistant to the chairman of the National Security Resources Board. From 1951 to 1960, he was vice president of the Convair division of General Dynamics in San Diego, California. He served as the Washington liaison and was a strong proponent of the Intercontinental Ballistic Missile and Global Surveillance System in the 1950s. He then served as President of Fairbanks Morse from 1960 until August 1962. In 1965 he was a senior projects manager at North American Aviation's (later North American Rockwell) Space Division in Downey, California.

=== Death ===
Lanphier died November 26, 1987, in San Diego, California, of cancer. He was buried in Arlington National Cemetery.

== In popular culture ==
Lanphier was played by actor William Schallert in the 1960 film, The Gallant Hours.

== Legacy and decorations ==
During World War II, Colonel Lanphier was credited with downing three and half Japanese planes, damaging eight on the ground, and sinking a destroyer. His decorations include:

USAF Command Pilot
Navy Cross
Silver Star with bronze oak leaf cluster	Distinguished Flying Cross with bronze oak leaf cluster	Air Medal with 1 silver oak leaf cluster
Navy Presidential Unit Citation with 1 service star	Department of the Air Force Decoration for Exceptional Civilian Service	American Defense Service Medal
American Campaign Medal	Asiatic-Pacific Campaign Medal with 2 bronze campaign stars	World War II Victory Medal

=== Navy Cross citation ===
Lanphier Jr., Thomas G.
Captain, U.S Army Air Forces
339th Fighter Squadron, 347th Fighter Group, 13th Air Force (Detached)
Date of Action: April 18, 1943

Citation:

The President of the United States of America takes pleasure in presenting the Navy Cross to Captain (Air Corps) Thomas George Lanphier, Jr., United States Army Air Forces, for extraordinary heroism while serving as Pilot of a P-38 fighter airplane in the 339th Fighter Squadron, 37th Fighter Group, Thirteenth Air Force, U.S. Army Air Forces, attached to a Marine Fighter Command in action against enemy Japanese forces in the Solomon Islands on 18 April 1943. Leading a division of fighter planes at dangerously low altitude in the longest planned interception mission ever attempted, Captain Lanphier contacted the assigned objective, consisting of two enemy bombers and six escort fighters, with complete tactical surprise and launched a fierce, determined attack. In the ensuing engagement he operated with such daring courage and excellent marksmanship that he sent the leading bomber crashing in flames, and subsequently shot down one of the hostile fighters when it furiously attacked his plane. The outstanding professional skill and inspiring leadership displayed by Captain Lanphier under extremely adverse conditions contributed greatly to the remarkable success of this vital mission and were in keeping with the highest traditions of the United States Armed Services.
