= Charles Henry Parkhurst =

American clergyman (1842–1933)

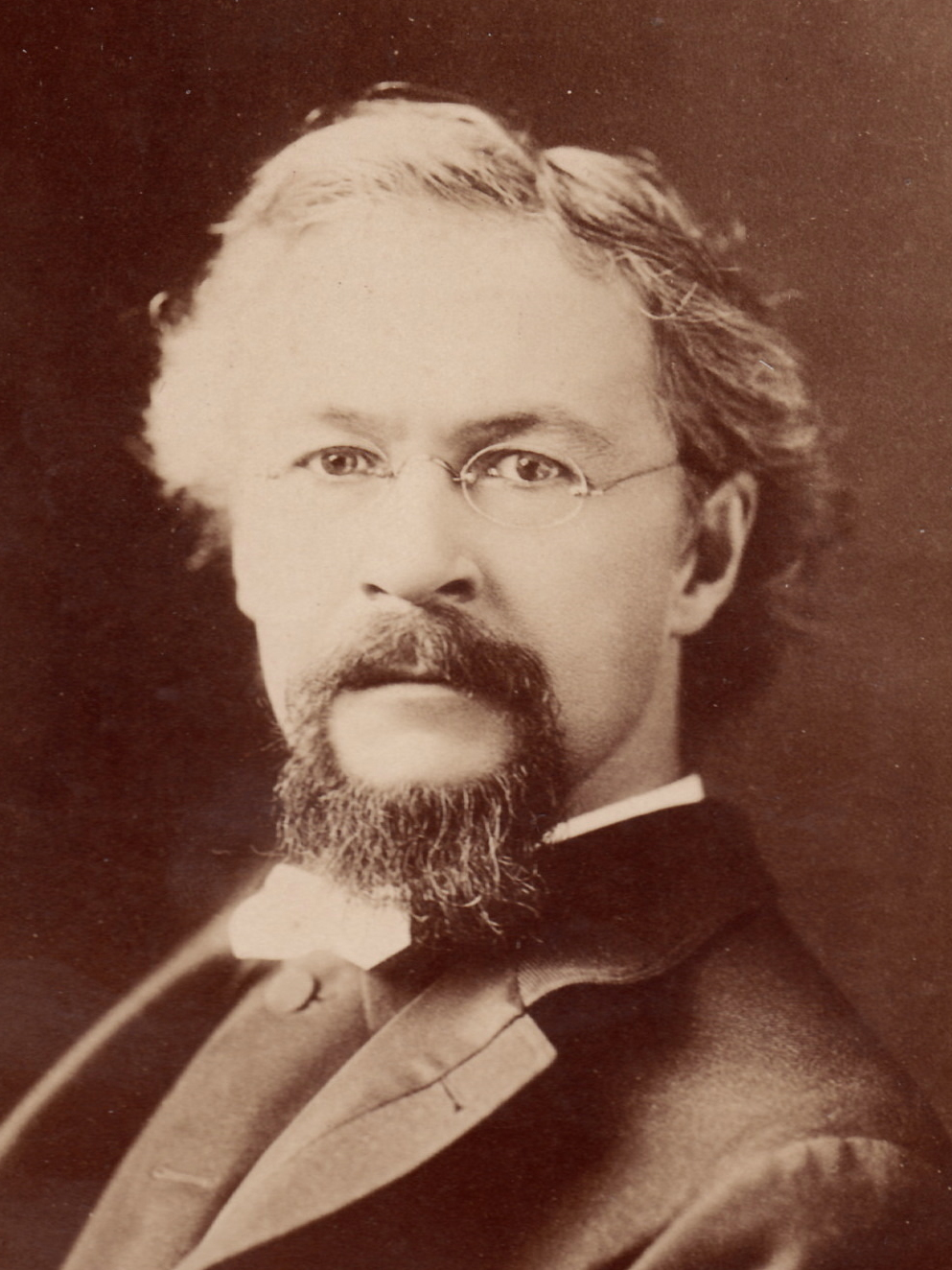
- Parkhurst in 1892
- Born: April 17, 1842; Framingham, Massachusetts, US
- Died: September 8, 1933 (aged 91); Ventnor City, New Jersey, US
- Occupation: Social reformer
- Spouses: Ellen Bodman (m. 1870; died 1921) Eleanor Marx (m. 1927)

Charles Henry Parkhurst (April 17, 1842 – September 8, 1933) was an American clergyman and social reformer, born in Framingham, Massachusetts. Although scholarly and reserved, he preached two sermons in 1892 in which he attacked the political corruption of New York City government. Backed by the evidence he collected, his statements led to both the exposure of Tammany Hall and to subsequent social and political reforms.

== Early years ==
Parkhurst was born on a farm on April 17, 1842, in Framingham, Massachusetts. Despite not attending a formal school until he was 12, he showed a strong interest in education and graduated from Amherst College in 1866. He became principal of the high school in Amherst in 1867. Parkhurst studied theology at Halle in 1869, and became a professor at the Williston Seminary in Easthampton, Massachusetts, in 1870–1871.

After further studies in Leipzig in 1872–1873, he was ordained as a Presbyterian minister. He was pastor of a congregational church at Lenox, Massachusetts, from 1874 until 1880, when he was called to the Madison Square Presbyterian Church, New York City, where he served from 1880 to 1918.

== Later life ==
Interested in municipal affairs, Parkhurst was elected president of the New York Society for the Prevention of Crime in 1891, and he challenged the methods of the city police department. He inaugurated a campaign against the political and social corruption of Tammany Hall. The hall had begun innocuously as just a social club, but had drifted into politics and graft. It acquired a lock on elections in the city, and its bosses protected crime and vice in Manhattan and surrounding boroughs. Grand jury investigations were ineffective, despite the appeals of social reformers. Few in Parkhurst's congregation recognized that Tammany Hall, the police, and organized crime were interconnected.

On February 14, 1892, he challenged Tammany Hall from the pulpit. Pointing to the hall's political influence and their connection with the police, he noted that men fed upon the city while pretending to protect it saying,

While we fight iniquity, they shield and patronize it; while we try to convert criminals, they manufacture them ...

— Parkhurst on Tammany Hall corruption

When the municipal grand jury asked him for hard evidence, Parkhurst personally hired a private detective and, with his friend John Erving, went to the streets in disguise to collect proof of the corruption. From the pulpit on March 13, 1892, he preached a sermon backed with documentation and affidavits. Parkhurst's campaign led to the appointment of the Lexow Committee to investigate conditions, and to the election of a reform mayor in 1894. Although Tammany Hall did publicly clean house, it remained influential on both the political front and in organized crime until the 1950s.

== Women's suffrage ==
Parkhurst was opposed to women voting. He wrote:

"That quality of feminine blatancy which is being at present so extensively advertised here and in England, that disposition toward self-exploitation indulged in by short-haired women and encouraged by long-haired men, is of a sort to chill and then freeze over those masculine impulses that seek restful and satisfying companionship in a member of the opposite sex."

== Personal life ==
He married Ellen Bodman, one of his former students, on November 23, 1870; Bodman died on May 28, 1921. He then married Eleanor Marx on April 18, 1927, in Los Angeles.

Parkhurst died on September 8, 1933, when he sleepwalked off the porch roof of his Ventnor City, New Jersey home.

== See also ==
- Lexow Committee 1894 to 1895, a major New York State Senate probe into police corruption
