= Thomas George Lanphier Sr. =

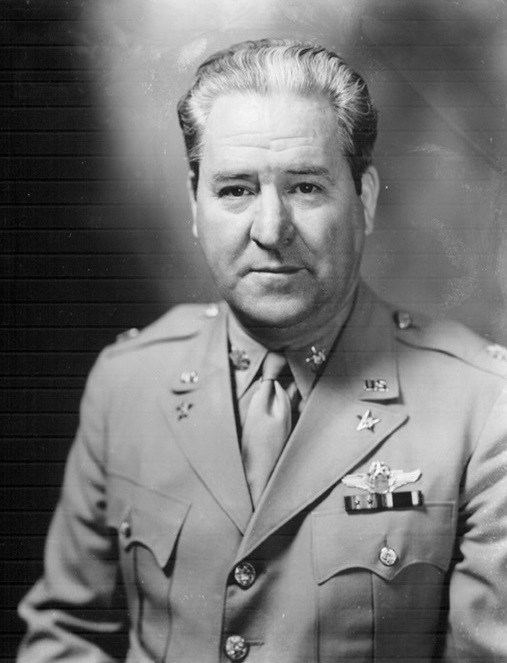
- Col. Thomas George Lanphier Sr.
- Born: April 16, 1890; Lohrville, Iowa, US
- Died: October 9, 1972 (aged 82); San Diego, California, US
- Burial place: Arlington National Cemetery, Arlington, Virginia
- Spouse(s): Janet Cobb (m. 1915-div. 1936); Mary E. Werner (m. 1938-1972, his death)
- Relatives: Thomas George Lanphier Jr. (1915–1987); Charles Cobb Lanphier (1918–1944); James Francis Lanphier (1920–1969)
- Military career
- Allegiance: United States
- Branch: United States Army Air Corps
- Service years: 1914–1945
- Rank: Colonel
- Service number: O3727
- Commands: 1st Pursuit Group; Selfridge Field, Michigan
- Conflicts: World War I World War II
- Other work: Veterans Administration (1943–1954).

Signature
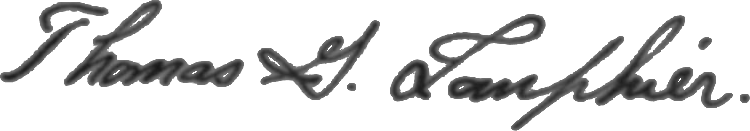

Thomas George Lanphier Sr. (April 16, 1890 – October 9, 1972) was a retired colonel in the United States Army Air Corps, and was commanding officer of Selfridge Field in Michigan from late 1924 to early 1926, and an aviation pioneer. He is buried in Arlington National Cemetery in Virginia.

== Early years ==
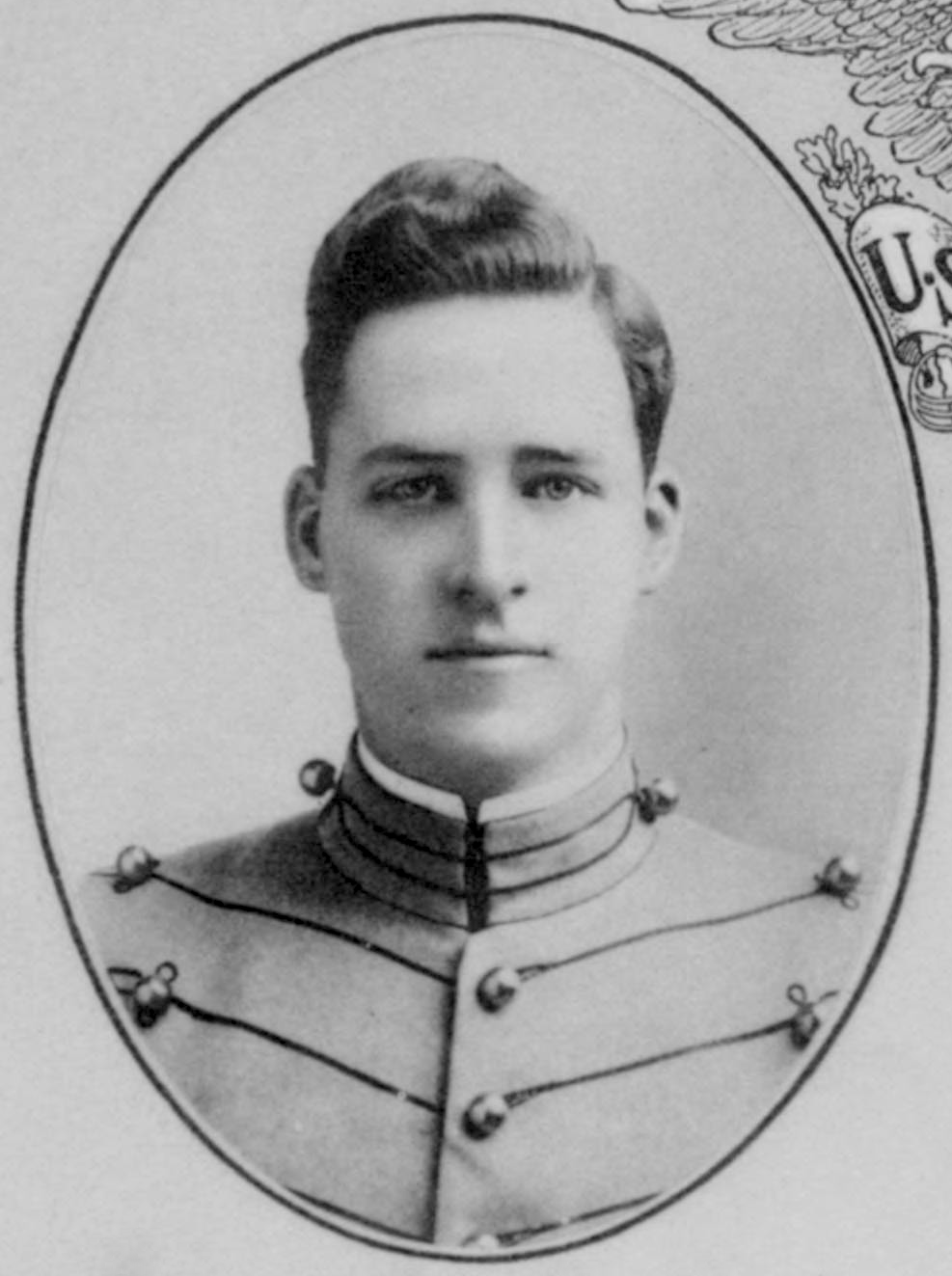
At West Point in 1914

Lanphier was born April 16, 1890, in Lohrville, Calhoun County, Iowa, to John Joseph "Jack" Lanphier and Catherine Ann "Kate" Carey. His father, John Joseph "Jack" Lanphier, was born on September 27, 1854, in Biddulph, Middlesex County, Ontario, Canada. His grandparents on both sides were from Ireland. His parents were married February 15, 1882, in Biddulph. They moved to Lohrville, where they had six children: Bernard Anthony; Cyril Crawford; Cecilia Margaret; Thomas George Sr.; Basil "Charles"; and Catherine Loretto.

When Lanphier was twelve years old his family moved to Omaha, Nebraska. He attended Creighton Preparatory School and Creighton University, followed by the United States Military Academy at West Point, New York. While at West Point, he met his future wife Janet Cobb, who was attending Vassar College. They married February 1, 1915, in New York. Lanphier graduated from West Point in 1914 and was a classmate and friend of Dwight D. Eisenhower.

== World War I and interwar period ==
After West Point, Lanphier was stationed in the Panama Canal Zone. His unit was transferred to France in March 1918 after the US entered World War I. He served in combat in a machine gun unit and was later transferred to the air corps. He received pilot training at Issoudun Aerodrome, France. He returned to the United States June 1, 1919.

After World War I, Lanphier was stationed at Mitchel Field, New York, in February 1921. He was stationed at Post Field, Fort Sill, later that year until September 1924. He was transferred to Selfridge Field in Michigan by November 1924.

Later, Lanphier became the commandant of the 1st Pursuit Group at Selfridge Field. Lanphier was commanding officer of Selfridge Fieldfrom late 1924 to early 1926.

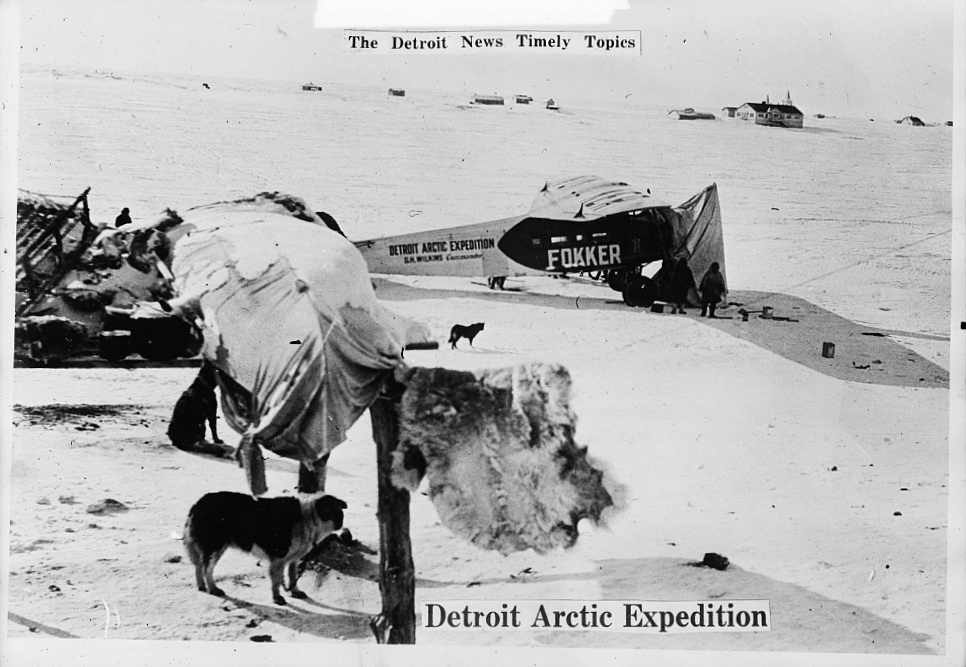
Major Lanphier was an unofficial observer during the Wilkins Detroit Arctic Expedition, 1926.

Major Lanphier was an unofficial observer during a 1926 Arctic flying expedition led by Hubert Wilkins.

Lanphier testified in support of General Billy Mitchell during Mitchell's 1925 court-martial.

Lanphier was a friend and business partner of Colonel Charles Lindbergh and was one of Lindbergh's flying instructors. On July 1, 1927, Lanphier flew the Spirit of St. Louis on a single flight in the vicinity of Selfridge Field. Lanphier was the head of the Transcontinental Air Transport Company (September 1928) and in 1931 was the president of Bird Aircraft Corporation, the manufacturer of the Brunner-Winkle Bird. He also gave a statement in the aftermath of the Lindbergh kidnapping and piloted an airplane during the search for Lindbergh's son.

In 1933, after retiring from the military, he bought Manhattan's Phoenix Cereal Beverage Company and applied for a license to manufacture 3.2 beer under the brewery's old name of Flanagan-Nay Brewery Corp. The brewery had been operated by mobsters Owney Madden and Bill Dwyer since 1925 during Prohibition. Madden also ordered an airplane and took flight instruction from Lanphier.

In 1936, Lanphier headed The Association for Legalizing American Lotteries, an illegal lottery.

Lanphier and Janet Cobb-Lanphier divorced on March 19, 1936, in Wayne County, Michigan.

In 1938, Lanphier assisted Mary E. Werner, the daughter of former Summit County, Ohio, coroner Dr. Oscar Hayes, with locating her two children. They had been abducted by her ex-husband, Albert R. Werner, after she was awarded custody in their divorce the previous October. After a fast courtship, Lanphier married Mary in a civil ceremony in Akron, Ohio, on March 10, 1938.

== World War II and later ==
In World War II, Lanphier Sr. returned to the Army as a lieutenant colonel and was made the air intelligence officer for Army Chief of Staff General George C. Marshall.

He voluntarily entered inactive duty in 1943 and was appointed to the Veterans Administration by General Omar Bradley. He was a deputy administrator for the Dallas District Office in 1947. He was the manager of the Dallas District Office in 1950. He retired from the VA in 1954.

Mary, his second wife, died on July 11, 1951. Lanphier later married his final wife, Elsa, and they remained married until his death.

Lanphier died on October 9, 1972, at the Naval Medical Center San Diego. He was interred October 17, 1972, in section 11, grave 826-B at Arlington National Cemetery.

== Sons ==
His oldest son Thomas George Lanphier Jr. was born while Lanphier Sr. was in Panama. Lanphier Jr. was a colonel and ace fighter pilot during World War II. He was involved in Operation Vengeance, the mission to shoot down the plane carrying Admiral Yamamoto, the commander in chief of the Imperial Japanese Navy, April 18, 1943. He was also buried at Arlington National Cemetery.

Another son, Charles Cobb Lanphier, was also a pilot. He was a captain in the United States Marine Corps attached to VMF-214 (the Black Sheep squadron) when his F4U Corsair crashed during a mission at Bougainville Island on August 28, 1943. He was captured and on May 15, 1944, he died of neglect while in captivity at a prison camp in Rabaul, Papua New Guinea. His remains were recovered and 1st Lt. Charles C. Lanphier, USMC was interred at Arlington National Cemetery, April 5, 1949.

Lanphier had a third son who was an actor, James Francis Lanphier, born in New York in 1920 and died in California, 1969. He was perhaps best known for his role in the 1963 film The Pink Panther.
