= The Waterworks =

1994 novel by E. L. Doctorow

- First edition
- Author: E. L. Doctorow
- Language: English
- Genre: Historical fiction
- Publisher: Random House
- Publication date: 1994
- Publication place: United States
- Media type: Print (Hardback & Paperback)

The Waterworks (1994) is a book by American writer E. L. Doctorow. It was his eighth published novel.

== Principal characters ==
- McIlvaine — veteran newspaper editor, lifelong bachelor, first-person narrator. We never learn his first name
- Martin Pemberton — Freelance journalist, who writes scathing reviews and is at odds with his father Augustus
- Augustus Pemberton — gained wealth from the slave trade and the production of low grade war goods during the American Civil War
- Harry Wheelwright — artist/painter and the only friend of Martin Pemberton.
- Emily Tisdale — fiancée and schoolfriend of Martin
- Reverend Charles Grimshaw — in the circle of Augustus Pemberton
- Edmund Donne — One of the few policemen in New York who is not corrupt.
- Dr. Wrede Sartorius — Doctor with a Faust-like thirst for knowledge . He worked in military hospitals during the Civil War. In this role he appears in E.L. Doctorow's later novel, The March. McIlvaine gives the origin of his name which is the Latin word for dressmaker.

== Extended plot summary ==
The novel is a first-person account written by the character McIlvaine some thirty or forty years after the events portrayed in the novel.

The setting of the novel is New York City in 1871. McIlvaine, a newspaper editor, begins with his account of Martin Pemberton, a freelance journalist who works under him. Martin’s father, Augustus Pemberton, is recently deceased. Augustus had disinherited Martin several years earlier after Martin expressed disapproval of the unscrupulous business methods by which Augustus had accumulated a large fortune. After his father's death, Martin sees his father, briefly and accidentally, in a horse-drawn "omnibus" belonging to the municipal transportation company as it drives past him in a crowded street. The passengers, including his father, are all elderly well-dressed men.

Martin tells four people of the sighting: his editor, McIlvaine; his fiancée, Emily Tisdale; the family pastor, Dr. Grimshaw; and a college friend, Harry Wheelwright. When Martin mysteriously disappears soon afterward, McIlvaine begins looking for him by first talking to all four. He also talks to Augustus's widow (and Martin's stepmother), Sarah Pemberton, who has always liked Martin and is deeply concerned about him. From Wheelwright, McIlvaine learns that he and Martin secretly opened Augustus's grave and found a child buried there instead of the old man.

From Sarah, McIlvaine learns that Augustus was diagnosed with a terminal blood disease and that with the assistance of his secretary, Eustace Simmons, he entered a private hospital said to be near Saranac Lake in upstate New York and run by a Dr. Sartorius. There, she was told, Augustus died. Sarah also reveals that Augustus's wealth seems to have vanished shortly before his death, leaving Sarah and her young son, Martin's half-brother Noah, penniless.

McIlvaine approaches an old acquaintance, police captain Edmund Donne, for help. Donne, McIlvaine soon finds out, has a personal interest in the case - he had courted Augustus's widow Sarah many years earlier, before her marriage to Augustus. Their investigation finds no trace of the hospital in which Augustus supposedly died. Instead, it takes them to The Home for Little Wanderers, a well-funded private orphanage run by Eustace Simmons. They discover Martin locked in the basement, catatonic and almost dead of starvation.

When Martin is at last well enough to talk, he reveals what he discovered after being kidnapped and imprisoned by Simmons to stop him from asking questions about Augustus. Augustus Pemberton had faked his death. Along with other wealthy old men of the city, each of whom was terminally ill, Augustus is being kept alive by Dr. Sartorius. Sartorius, a brilliant and innovative Army surgeon during the Civil War, has invented treatments that were then unknown to medicine: blood transfusions, dialysis, bone marrow transplants and others. His dark secret is that young children must be sacrificed for their blood and somatic cells. Dr. Sartorius considers himself innocent of their actual deaths, as each child "died from fright" and not from his nefarious medical attention.

With the assistance of the corrupt Tweed Ring, which runs New York (and with which several of the old men are connected), Sartorius has built a secret sanitarium in which he is free to experiment and administer his treatments without any supervision.

When Donne discovers the location of the sanitarium in a municipal waterworks installation outside the city, he stages a police raid. The Tweed Ring is in the process of being destroyed by a corruption investigation and is no longer able to protect Sartorius and his establishment. Sartorius is arrested; his patients are found dead except for Augustus, who is missing.

Sartorius is brought to the insane asylum on Blackwell's Island, where he claims to be continuing his research. Augustus, who was removed from the sanitarium by Simmons before the raid, is found dead at his old home. Simmons is also found dead, killed in an accident while trying to flee with part of Augustus's fortune. The money is turned over to Sarah, as Augustus's widow. Sarah and Donne are soon married. Martin, now recovered, marries his fiancée, Emily. McIlvaine resumes his career as an editor, but never publishes the story of his investigation.

== Worldview ==
The first-person narrator presents a very negative image of the city he lives in – and he shows the readers an authentic view on the New York in 1871. He describes the corruption by William Tweed (whose picture we know from Thomas Nast's cartoons, published in Harper's Weekly) and he describes the child poverty, the calamities of the newsboys and a lot of buildings and streets how they looked at this time. He cites Walt Whitman for showing that his New York is another one.

== Relation to other works by the author ==
The novel was less successful than Doctorow' previous works Billy Bathgate (1989) and Ragtime (1975), but like them it combines history with fiction. Some of its characters appear in other works by the author, such as the appearance of Dr Sartorius in The March (2005). Doctorow's father loved Edgar Allan Poe and named his first son after him, and Doctorow told a journalist that Waterworks was written in Poe's honour. In 1984 Doctorow had previously written a story about the Croton Aqueduct titled "Waterworks" which is featured in the collection Lives of the Poets. It is the story of McIlvaine, who watched the child drowning in the reservoir.

== Sources in literary history ==
The descriptions of child poverty are evocative of the novels by Charles Dickens. Dickens himself visited New York in the early 1840s and wrote the book American Notes. Another possible source is George G. Foster's New York by Gas-light and Other Urban Sketches (1850).

== Sources ==
- Doctorow, E. L.: Waterworks, New York, 2007. ISBN 978-0-8129-7819-3
- Weber, Bruce (July 5, 1995). "E. L. Doctorow's New York; A Native of the Bronx Chronicles a Century of the City". New York Times.
- Schama, Simon: "New York, Gaslight Necropolis", In: New York Times, 19.06.1994.
- Foster, George G.: New York by Gas-Light and Other Urban Sketches. 1990. ISBN 978-0-520-06722-6
- Doctorow, E. L.: Lives of the Poets: A Novella and Six Stories. New York, 1997.
