= Welcome to Hard Times =

Welcome to Hard Times may refer to:

- Welcome to Hard Times (novel), by E.L. Doctorow
- Welcome to Hard Times (film), an adaptation of the novel
