= Baby Wilson =

- Short story by E. L. Doctorow
- Country: United States
- Language: English

Publication
- Published in: The New Yorker
- Publication date: March 25, 2002

"Baby Wilson" is a short story by E. L. Doctorow originally appearing in The New Yorker (March 25, 2002), and first collected in Sweet Land Stories (2004) by Random House.

== Plot ==
"Baby Wilson" is presented from a first-person point-of-view by a reliable narrator, Lester. The story opens in a Southern California suburb.

Lester is a twenty-something man who works menial jobs and shares an apartment with his girlfriend, Karen Robileaux, also in her twenties. He works at a diner; she at a health food store. Lester suspects that Karen is mentally unstable, and becomes convinced of this when she arrives home holding a newborn infant boy in her arms. Karen, who occasionally shoplifts, has abducted it from a local hospital; its wristband reads "Baby Wilson." Lester insists she return the child, but Karen adamantly refuses: "I couldn't do that—this is my newborn baby." Rather than seize the tiny kidnap victim and personally take it to the authorities, Lester passively submits to "this crazy lovesick girl." Lester is now an accessory to a serious felony after the fact. Lester visits his supervisor Brenda at the diner and seeks counsel on what to do. She disparages his stupidity for living with Karen, and warns him that kidnapping is a federal offense. Brenda, however, instructs him to pick up formula and diapers in the meantime at Kmart.

Monitoring the local news, Lester discovers that a police bulletin has been issued with a composite drawing of Karen provided by hospital staff; the FBI have been alerted. He decides to abscond to Las Vegas with Karen and the boy she has named "Jesu."

The street-wise Lester engages in a number of evasions after winning a few hundred dollars at a gambling casino: he changes the plates on his car and purchases several stolen credit cards to fund their flight. En route, Lester discovers he is falling more deeply in love with Karen.

The couple are shocked when authorities report that a ransom note has been delivered to the bereft parents of the child, who offer to pay it. The ransom note is a hoax. Lester and Karen realize they must relinquish the child. They locate a small Catholic church and anonymously Karen informs the kidnapping in confession: she tells the priest where to find the child on the premises. Baby Wilson is returned to his parents.

Lester proceeds to travel north to Alaska, where he and Karen—who is now pregnant—settle down to a new life. Lester works multiple jobs to support his family. Karen decides to call the male child she is carrying Jesu.

== Critical appraisal ==
New York Times literary critic Kakutani, Michiko regards these tales less "full-fladged stories" than mere sketches for proposed film adaptions.

"Baby Wilson," tracing the on-the-lam experiences of a young couple who have kidnapped a child, reads like a lackluster improvisation upon " The Sugarland Express (1974)...these stories do not unfold to make a larger point. Nor do they provide the reader with glimpses of their characters' inner lives or wider vistas of the worlds they inhabit."

Literary critic Peter Wolfe, writing in Prairie Schooner, reminds readers that "these unlucky souls aren't to be pitied or patronized...After restoring Baby Wilson to safety, shoeless, dreamy-faced Karen Robileaux starts her own family with the story's narrator in Alaska, where 'most people...don't quite fit into the greater U.S...so nobody asks too many questions.'" Wolfe adds: "Doctorow's other unfortunates will often pluck up the sinew, grit and resilience that helped build America."

Writing in World Socialist Web Site reviewer Sandy English distinguishes Doctorow for alluding to the social crisis his characters face:

[I]n The Best American Short Stories 2003, "Baby Wilson" stands in glaring contrast to most of the other stories: we are in America at the turn of the twenty-first century...The story has a real feeling for the emptiness and loneliness of much of American life today. The characters lack consciousness of their own lives, of the larger situation."

English acknowledges that "the motivation for the baby-snatching seems silly, like the one in the film Raising Arizona (1987), but this story presents some important images."

== Sources ==
- Doctorow, E. L.. 2004. Sweet Land Stories. Random House, New York. ISBN 978-1-4000-6204-1
- English, Sandy. 2004. "Best" short stories of 2003 could do better. World Socialist Web Site, September 6, 2004. https://www.wsws.org/en/articles/2004/09/best-s06.html Accessed October 2, 2025.
- English, Sandy. 2006. Some insights into American life as it is: Doctorow's Sweet Land Stories. WSWS, May 9, 2006. https://www.wsws.org/en/articles/2006/05/doct-m09.html Accessed September 30, 2025.
- Greenland, Colin. 2007. An Impoverished Country. The Guardian, February 3, 2007.https://www.theguardian.com/books/2007/feb/03/featuresreviews.guardianreview17 Accessed October 2, 2025.
- Kakutani, Michiko. 2004. BOOKS OF THE TIMES; Dreamers Awaken: Pages From a Storyteller's Sketchbook. New York Times, May 11, 2004. https://www.nytimes.com/2004/05/11/books/books-of-the-times-dreamers-awaken-pages-from-a-storyteller-s-sketchbook.html Accessed October 2, 2025.
- Wolfe, Peter. 2006. Sweet Land Stories by E. L. Doctorow Prairie Schooner, Vol. 80, No. 1 (Spring 2006), pp. 206-207 University of Nebraska Press https://www.jstor.org/stable/40638303 Accessed 30 September, 2025.
