= Homer & Langley =

2009 novel by E. L. Doctorow

- First edition
- Author: E. L. Doctorow
- Language: English
- Genre: Postmodern, historical
- Publisher: Random House
- Publication date: 2009
- Publication place: United States
- Media type: Print (hardback)
- Pages: 208 pp
- ISBN: 1-4000-6494-5
- OCLC: 290470025
- Preceded by: The March

Homer & Langley is a novel by American author E. L. Doctorow published in September 2009. It imagines a version of the lives of the Collyer brothers of New York City, notorious for their eccentricities as well as their habit of compulsively hoarding a plethora of various bric-à-brac, newspapers, books and other items.

Although Doctorow is unambiguous in identifying his fictional characters with the historical Collyer brothers, he changes many biographical facts in creating his story. Among the most overt are his extending the lives of the brothers by roughly thirty years into the early 1980s, reversing the birth order of the brothers, and making Homer, not Langley, the talented pianist.
