= Peekskill riots =

1949 anti-communist race riots against African Americans and Jews

- Date: August 27, 1949
- Location: Cortlandt Manor, New York, US; 41°19′36″N 73°52′54″W
- Caused by: Red Scare, Racism against African Americans

Casualties
- Injuries: 140
- Arrested: 12

The Peekskill riots took place at Cortlandt Manor, New York, United States, in 1949. The catalyst for the rioting was an announced concert by black singer Paul Robeson, who was well known for his strong pro-trade union stance, civil rights activism, communist affiliations, and anti-colonialism. The concert, organized as a benefit for the Civil Rights Congress, was scheduled to take place on August 27 in Lakeland Acres, just north of Peekskill.

== Paul Robeson's remarks in Paris, 1949 ==
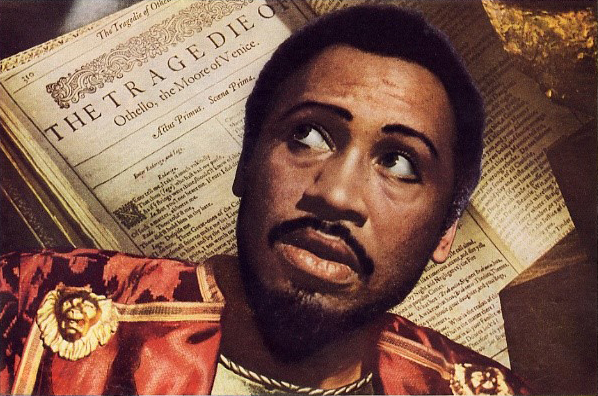
Robeson c. 1945

Robeson had given three earlier concerts in Peekskill without incident, but in the years leading up to the riots, Robeson had been increasingly vocal against the Ku Klux Klan and other forces of white supremacy, both domestically and internationally. Robeson specifically made a transformation from someone who was primarily a singer into a political persona who vocally supported what were, at the time, considered "communist" causes, including the decolonization of Africa, anti-Jim Crow legislation, and peace with the Soviet Union. Robeson had also appeared before the House Committee on Un-American Activities to oppose a bill that would require communists to register as foreign agents and, just months before the concerts in 1949, he had appeared at the Soviet-sponsored World Congress of Partisans for Peace in Paris. Referring to the growing tensions between the Americans and the Soviets, he stated:

We in America do not forget that it was the backs of white workers from Europe and on the backs of millions of blacks that the wealth of America was built. And we are resolved to share it equally. We reject any hysterical raving that urges us to make war on anyone. Our will to fight for peace is strong.... We shall support peace and friendship among all nations, with Soviet Russia and the People's Republics.

What came over the wires to news agencies via the AP in the United States was as follows,

We colonial peoples have contributed to the building of the United States and are determined to share its wealth. We denounce the policy of the United States government which is similar to Hitler and Goebbels.... It is unthinkable that American Negros would go to war on behalf of those who have oppressed us for generations against the Soviet Union which in one generation has lifted our people to full human dignity.

Later examination of time records showed that the AP dispatched this fabricated version on its wires as Robeson began speaking. The comment was not investigated by the American press for its veracity and there was nationwide condemnation of Robeson. In the early stages of the Cold War and its accompanying wide anti-communist sentiments in the West, this statement was seen by many as very anti-American. The local paper, the Peekskill Evening Star, condemned the concert and encouraged people to make their position on communism felt, but did not directly espouse violence. The riots were explicitly racist, with the rioters shouting racist terms for African Americans and Jews, burning crosses, and lynching effigies of Robeson both in Peekskill and in other areas of the United States.

== First concert ==
The concert, organized as a benefit for the Civil Rights Congress, was scheduled to take place on August 27 in Lakeland Acres, just north of Peekskill. Before Robeson arrived, a mob of locals attacked concert-goers with baseball bats and rocks. The local police arrived hours later and did little to intervene. Thirteen people were seriously injured, Robeson was lynched in effigy, and a cross was seen burning on an adjacent hillside. The concert was then postponed until September 4. Following the concert, request for Klan memberships from the Peekskill area numbered 748 persons.

Robeson's longtime friend and Peekskill resident, Helen Rosen, who had agreed to collect Robeson at the train station, had heard on the radio that protesters were massing at the concert grounds. Robeson drove with Rosen and two others to the concert site and saw marauding groups of youngsters, a burning cross on a nearby hill and a jeering crowd throwing rocks and chanting "Dirty Commie" and "Dirty Kikes." Robeson made more than one attempt to get out of the car and confront the mob but was restrained by his friends.

The media were flooded with reactions and charges. The Joint Veterans Council of Peekskill refused to admit any involvement, describing its activities as a "protest parade...held without disorder and...perfectly disbanded." Peekskill police officials said the picnic grounds had been outside their jurisdiction; a state police spokesman said there had never been a request for state troopers. The commander of Peekskill Post 274 of the American Legion stated: "Our objective was to prevent the Paul Robeson concert and I think our objective was reached."

=== Meetings to protest the first riot ===
Following a meeting of local citizens, union members, and Robeson supporters who formed The Westchester Committee for Law and Order, it unanimously was determined that Robeson should be invited back to perform at Peekskill. Representatives from various left wing unions - the Fur and Leather Workers, the Longshoremen and the United Electrical Workers - all agreed to converge and serve as a wall of defense around the concert grounds. Ten union men slept on the property of the Rosens, effectively guarding it. A call was put out by the Emergency Committee to Protest the Peekskill Riot. On Tuesday, August 30, an overflow crowd of 3,000 people assembled peacefully and without incident at the Golden Gate Ballroom in Harlem to hear Robeson speak,

I will be loyal to America of true traditions; to the America of the abolitionists, of Harriet Tubman, of Thaddeus Stevens, of those who fought for my people's freedom, not of those who tried to enslave them. And I will have no loyalty to the Forrestals, to the Harrimans, to the WallStreeters... the surest way to get police protection is to have it very clear that we'll protect ourselves, and good!... I'll be back with my friends in Peekskill...

== Second concert ==
The rescheduled September 4, 1949, concert, where Robeson did sing, was also marred by violence despite the presence of a police helicopter overhead and at least one sniper's nest. The concert was located on the grounds of the old Hollow Brook Golf Course in Cortlandt Manor, near the site of the original concert. 20,000 people showed up. Security was organized by the Communist Party and Communist-dominated labor unions. The men were directed by the Communist Party and some unions to form a line around the outer edge of the concert area and were sitting with Robeson on the stage. They were there to fight any protestors who objected to Robeson's presence. The singers and musicians performed without incident, but groups of protesters surged into the crowd as the concertgoers were leaving, causing chaos.

=== Setlist ===
- Sylvia Kahn: "The Star-Spangled Banner"
- Piano performances by Leonid Hambro and Ray Lev including works by Chopin and Bach, Prokofiev and Ravel
- Singing by soprano Hope Foye
- Pete Seeger: "T For Texas", "If I Had a Hammer", and another song
- Paul Robeson: "Go Down Moses", the English ballad "No John No", and "Farewell, My Son, I'm Dying" («Прощай, мой сын, умираю...», Proshchay, moy syn, umirayu...), the final aria from Boris Godunov
- Appeal for funds
- Paul Robeson: Seven other songs, including "America the Beautiful" and Negro spirituals ending with "Ol' Man River"

Robeson's accompaniment was provided by Larry Brown.

=== Aftermath ===
The aftermath of the concert, however, was far from peaceful. After some violence to south-going buses near the intersection of Locust Avenue and Hillside Avenue, concertgoers were diverted to head northward to Oregon Corners and forced to run a gauntlet miles long of veterans and their families, who threw rocks through windshields of the cars and buses. Much of the violence was also caused by anti-Communist members of local Veterans of Foreign Wars and American Legion chapters. Standing off the angry mob of rioters chanting "go on back to Russia, you niggers" and "white niggers", some of the concertgoers and union members, along with writer Howard Fast and others assembled a non-violent line of resistance, locked arms, and sang the song "We Shall Not Be Moved." Some people were reportedly dragged from their vehicles and beaten. Over 140 people were injured and numerous vehicles were severely damaged as police stood by. 41°19′36.75″N 73°52′54.52″W

One car carried Woody Guthrie, Lee Hays, Pete Seeger, Seeger's wife Toshi, and his infant children. Guthrie pinned a shirt to the inside of the window to stop it shattering. "Wouldn't you know it, Woody pinned up a red shirt," Hays was to remember. Seeger used some of the thrown rocks to build the chimney of his cabin in the Town of Fishkill, New York, to stand as a reminder of the incident.

Eugene Bullard, the first black combat pilot and decorated World War I veteran, was knocked to the ground and beaten by the mob, which included white members of state and local law enforcement. The beating was captured on film and can be seen in the 1970s documentary The Tallest Tree in Our Forest and the Oscar-winning, Sidney Poitier-narrated documentary Paul Robeson: Tribute to an Artist. Despite recorded evidence of the beating, no one was prosecuted for the assault. Graphic photos of Eugene Bullard being beaten by two policemen, a state trooper and concert-goer, were published in The Whole World in His Hands: A Pictorial Biography of Paul Robeson, by Susan Robeson.

=== Protests afterwards ===
Following the riots, more than 300 people went to Albany, New York to express their indignation to Governor Thomas Dewey, who refused to meet with them, blaming communists for provoking the violence. Still, Dewey called on the Westchester County District Attorney to impanel a Grand Jury investigation into both riots. The investigation concluded in June 1950 by largely exonerating local authorities and blaming the violence on communist provocation. Twenty-seven plaintiffs filed a civil suit against Westchester County and two veterans' groups. The charges were dismissed three years later.

=== Reactions in the U.S. House of Representatives ===
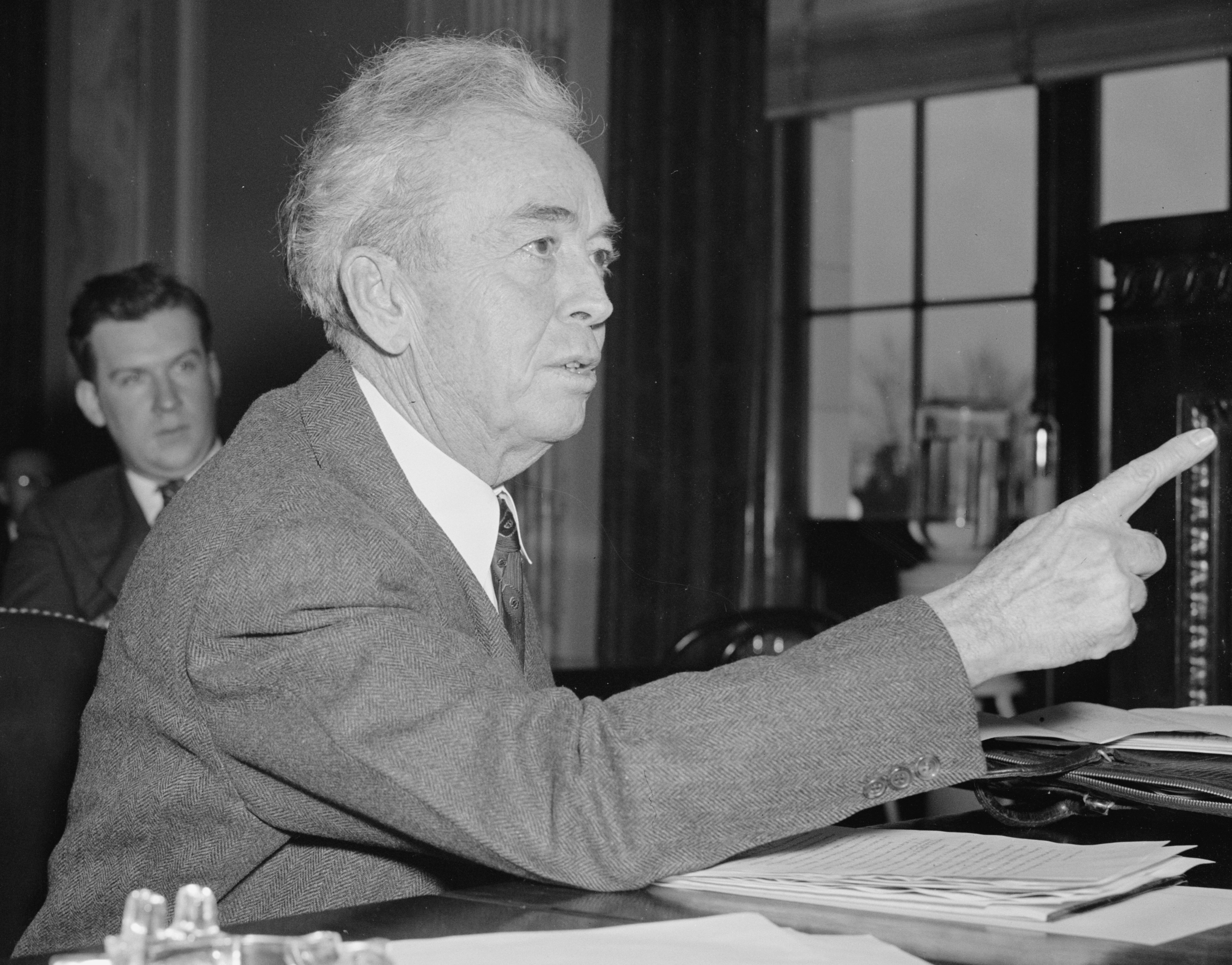
Representative John E. Rankin in 1938

Following the Peekskill riots, Democratic House Representative John E. Rankin of Mississippi condemned Robeson on the house floor. When New York Congressman Jacob Javits, a liberal Republican, spoke to the United States House of Representatives, deploring the Peekskill riots as a violation of constitutional guarantees of freedom of speech and free assembly, Rankin replied angrily: "It was not surprising to hear the gentlemen from New York defend the Communist enclave." Rankin said that he wanted it known that the American people are not in sympathy "with that Nigger Communist and that bunch of Reds who went up there." On a point of order, American Labor Party House Representative Vito Marcantonio protested to House Speaker Sam Rayburn that "the gentlemen from Mississippi used the word 'nigger.' I ask that the word be taken down and stricken from the RECORD inasmuch as there are two members in this house of Negro race." Rayburn claimed that Rankin had not said "nigger" but "Negro" but Rankin yelled over him saying "I said Niggra! Just as I have said since I have been able to talk and shall continue to say." Speaker Rayburn then defended Rankin, ruling that "the gentlemen from Mississippi is not subject to a point of order...referred to the Negro race and they should not be afraid of that designation." Then Democratic Representative E. Eugene Cox of Georgia denounced Robeson on the House floor as a "Communist agent provocateur."

=== Aftermath ===
Within a few days, hundreds of editorials and letters appeared in newspapers across the nation and abroad by prominent individuals, organizations, trade unions, churches and others. They condemned the attacks and the failure of Governor Dewey and the State Police to protect the lives and property of citizens as well as called for a full investigation of the violence and prosecution of the perpetrators. Despite condemnation from progressives and civil rights activists, the mainstream press and local officials overwhelmingly blamed Robeson and his fans for "provoking" the violence. Following the Peekskill riots, other cities became fearful of similar incidents, and over 80 scheduled concert dates of Robeson's were canceled.

On September 12, 1949, in response to Robeson's controversial status in the press and leftist affiliations, the National Maritime Union convention considered a motion that Robeson's name be removed from the union's honorary membership list. The motion was withdrawn for lack of support among members. Later that month, the All-China Art and Literature Workers' Association and All-China Association of Musicians of Liberated China protested the Peekskill attack on Robeson. On October 2, 1949, Robeson spoke at a luncheon for the National Labor Conference for Peace held at the Ashland Auditorium in Chicago, referred the riots in his remarks.

== Legacy and reconciliation ceremonies ==
In recent years, Westchester County has gone to great lengths to make amends to the survivors of the riots by holding a commemorative ceremony, at which an apology was made for their treatment. In September 1999, county officials held a "Remembrance and Reconciliation Ceremony, 50th anniversary commemoration of the 1949 Peekskill riots." It included speakers Paul Robeson, Jr., folk singer Peter Seeger and several local elected officials.

== In fiction ==
- The Peekskill riots appear in E. L. Doctorow's novel The Book of Daniel. Paul Isaacson (a fictionalized version of Julius Rosenberg) leaves the bus to reason with the mob, and is beaten up by them.
- The riots figure prominently in T. C. Boyle's World's End. The protagonist's adoptive parents serve as local, assistant organizers of the concert (alias of "Peterskill" riots within the book).
- In Ring Lardner Jr.'s The Ecstasy of Owen Muir (1954), there is an extensive segment concerning the incidents at Peekskill.

== In recording and film ==
- Song: "Hold the Line" by Pete Seeger and The Weavers
- Song: "Let Robeson Sing" by Manic Street Preachers
- Song: "My Thirty Thousand" by Woody Guthrie, later recorded by Billy Bragg and Wilco
- Song: "Three Chords and The Truth" written and recorded by Ry Cooder
- Song: ”The Peekskill Story”(Casetta/Hayes/Seeger) The Weavers with Howard Fast and Pete Seeger
- Song: "Gotta Get To Peekskill" by Dropkick Murphy's
- Radio: NPR's 50th anniversary commemoration of Peekskill riots
- Radio: The Peekskill Riots, Maryknoll Sisters radio documentary
- Radio: NBC Radio Interviews
- Video: The Robeson Concerts
- Video: Paul Robeson: Here I Stand, PBS American Masters
- Video: Paul Robeson: Speak of Me As I Am BBC
- Film: Joe Glory
- Film: Paul Robeson: The Tallest Tree in Our Forest
- Film: Paul Robeson: Portrait of an Artist
- Film: The Peekskill Riots, a five-part docuseries created by Jon Scott Bennett

== See also ==
- List of incidents of civil unrest in the United States
