= All the Time in the World =

All the Time in the World may refer to:

== Film and television ==
- "All the Time in the World", an episode from season 5 of the TV series Alias
- "All the Time in the World", an episode of the TV series Tales of Tomorrow adapting Arthur C. Clarke's short story
- Spy Kids: All the Time in the World, the fourth installment of the Spy Kids franchise
- All the Time in the World (2014 film), a 2014 documentary film by Suzanne Crocker

== Music ==
- All the Time in the World (Lazlo Bane album), 2002
- All the Time in the World (Jump5 album), 2002
- All the Time in the World (Lowen & Navarro album)
- "All the Time in the World" (Dr. Hook song), 1978
- "All the Time in the World", a song by Deep Purple from the 2013 album Now What?!
- "We Have All the Time in the World", a 1969 Louis Armstrong song used in the James Bond film On Her Majesty's Secret Service

== Literature ==
- All the Time in the World (book), by E. L. Doctorow
- "All the Time in the World", a 1952 short story by Arthur C. Clarke
