= Achieving Our Country =

1998 book by Richard Rorty

Achieving Our Country: Leftist Thought in Twentieth-Century America
- Cover
- Author: Richard Rorty
- Cover artist: Louis Lozowick
- Language: English
- Series: Massey Lectures
- Subject: Politics of the United States
- Publisher: Harvard University Press
- Publication date: 1998
- Publication place: United States
- Media type: Print (Hardcover)
- Pages: 159
- ISBN: 978-0-674-00311-8
- Dewey Decimal: 303.48/4 21
- LC Class: HN90.R3 R636 1998

Achieving Our Country: Leftist Thought in Twentieth-Century America is a 1998 book by American philosopher Richard Rorty, in which the author differentiates between what he sees as the two sides of the left, a cultural left and a reformist left. He criticizes the cultural left, which is exemplified by post-structuralists such as Michel Foucault and post-modernists such as Jean-François Lyotard. Although these intellectuals make insightful claims about the ills of society, Rorty holds that they provide no alternatives and even present progress as problematic at times. On the other hand, the reformist left, exemplified for Rorty by John Dewey, makes progress its priority in its goal of "achieving our country." Rorty sees the reformist left as acting in the philosophical spirit of pragmatism.

== Summary ==
Achieving Our Country is an adaptation of Massey Lectures that Rorty gave at Harvard University. It consists of expanded versions of the three lectures, two appendices ("Movements and Campaigns", "The Inspirational Value of Great Works of Literature") as well as the notes, acknowledgements, and index.

=== "American National Pride: Whitman and Dewey" ===
Rorty begins by arguing the case for "national pride"; having pride in a nation motivates people to seek to improve their nation – one must feel emotion of some sort. But in recent times, such as after the Vietnam War and towards the end of the twentieth century, art and, for Rorty, literature, in particular, are not cultivating a form of national pride, and hence are affecting politics: "Competition for political leadership is in part a competition between differing stories about a nation's self-identity, and between differing symbols of its greatness.

Rorty singles out Snow Crash and Leslie Marmon Silko's Almanac of the Dead as modern works that serve as exemplars of the second of two predominant narratives, a rejection of national pride with "tones either of self-mockery or of self-disgust" (the other narrative is a "simple-minded militaristic chauvinism"). The rejection of national pride is fundamentally weakening and dispiriting: "Novels like Stephenson's, Condon's The Manchurian Candidate, and Pynchon's Vineland are novels not of social protest but rather of rueful acquiescence in the end of American hopes."

The second narrative is equally dispiriting but for a different reason; leftist literature often focuses on what is wrong with America and where there is hypocrisy and actions at odds with avowed ideals, so "When young intellectuals watch John Wayne war movies after reading Heidegger, Foucault, Stephenson, or Silko, they often become convinced that they live in a violent, inhuman, corrupt country ... this insight does not move them to formulate a legislative program, to join a political movement, or to share in a national hope." Rorty contrasts the named novels with the socialist novels of the early 1900s – The Jungle, An American Tragedy, The Grapes of Wrath, etc.

The essential theme to those novels is that America is not yet achieved, that "the tone of the Gettysburg Address was absolutely right, but that our country would have to transform itself in order to fulfill Lincoln's hopes."

Rorty quotes approvingly Walt Whitman's Democratic Vistas: "'democracy' is a great word, whose history ... remains unwritten, because that history has yet to be enacted." This theme is consistent to the left and is where Rorty derives the title: "The Left, by definition, is the party of hope. It insists our nation remains unachieved." Whitman and John Dewey are essential to his discussion because he identifies them as crucial to developing the mythology of an unachieved America which was "ubiquitous on the American Left prior to the Vietnam War."

Their contribution is a pragmatic twist on Georg Wilhelm Friedrich Hegel and Hegelianism, in which America is eventually a glorious synthesis of all the opposed civilizations and ideas mingling in a democracy. This philosophy undergirds the old left's view. The context understood, Rorty promises to contrast "the Deweyan, pragmatic, participatory Left as it existed prior to the Vietnam War and the spectatorial Left which has taken its place."

== Reception ==
Several writers have cited Rorty's prediction of the rise of an authoritarian strongman who gains popularity among blue-collar workers, as prophetic of Donald Trump's rise to political power.

Wolf Lepenies noted Rorty's foresight in a German-language publication as it happened.

The passage that went viral is as follows:

[M]embers of labor unions, and unorganized unskilled workers, will sooner or later realize that their government is not even trying to prevent wages from sinking or to prevent jobs from being exported. Around the same time, they will realize that suburban white-collar workers—themselves desperately afraid of being downsized—are not going to let themselves be taxed to provide social benefits for anyone else.

At that point, something will crack. The nonsuburban electorate will decide that the system has failed and start looking for a strongman to vote for — someone willing to assure them that, once he is elected, the smug bureaucrats, tricky lawyers, overpaid bond salesmen, and postmodernist professors will no longer be calling the shots. A scenario like that of Sinclair Lewis' novel It Can't Happen Here may then be played out. For once such a strongman takes office, nobody can predict what will happen. In 1932, most of the predictions made about what would happen if Hindenburg named Hitler chancellor were wildly overoptimistic.

One thing that is very likely to happen is that the gains made in the past 40 years by black and brown Americans, and by homosexuals, will be wiped out. Jocular contempt for women will come back into fashion. The words 'nigger' and 'kike' will once again be heard in the workplace. All the sadism which the academic left has tried to make unacceptable to its students will come flooding back. All the resentment which badly educated Americans feel about having their manners dictated to them by college graduates will find an outlet.

== Translation ==
It has been published in Germany as Stolz auf unser Land: die amerikanische Linke und der Patriotismus (ISBN 978-3-518-58275-6), and translated into Japanese by Teruhiko Ozawa and published in Kyoto by Koyoshobo as Amerika mikan no purojekuto: nijuseiki amerika ni okeru sayoku shiso (ISBN 978-4-7710-1199-1). A Dutch translation was published by Boom in 2001 as De voltooiing van Amerika (which translates as The completion of America), (ISBN 978-90-5352-475-6). It has also been translated into Spanish by José Ramón del Castillo in 1999 as "Forjar Nuestro País: El pensamiento de izquierdas en los Estados Unidos del siglo XX"(ISBN 978-8-4493-0769-0), an edition containing a foreword by Rorty himself and a glossary by the translator.
