= Jolene (film) =

- Promotional poster
- Directed by: Dan Ireland
- Written by: Dennis Yares
- Based on: "Jolene: A Life" by E. L. Doctorow
- Produced by: Riva Yares; Zachary Matz
- Starring: Jessica Chastain; Dermot Mulroney; Chazz Palminteri; Rupert Friend; Denise Richards; Michael Vartan; Frances Fisher; Theresa Russell
- Cinematography: Claudio Rocha
- Edited by: Luis Colina
- Music by: Harry Gregson-Williams
- Production company: Next Turn Productions
- Distributed by: E1 Entertainment
- Release dates: June 13, 2008 (SIFF); October 29, 2010 (United States)
- Running time: 121 minutes
- Country: United States
- Language: English

Jolene is a 2008 American drama film directed by Dan Ireland, based on the 2002 short story "Jolene: A Life" by E. L. Doctorow. It marked Jessica Chastain's film debut. It premiered at the Seattle International Film Festival on June 13, 2008. It was later released in the United States on October 29, 2010.

== Plot ==
Fifteen-year-old orphan Jolene breaks free from foster care, marrying Mickey, a nerdy 20-year-old. They live with Mickey's Uncle Phil and Aunt Kay. On the night before her sixteenth birthday, Jolene asks Mickey about his mother, but he rebuffs her and starts crying. To make him feel better, she seduces him, but Mickey's inexperience leads to uncomfortable and joyless sex. The next day, Mickey and Uncle Phil wish Jolene "Happy Birthday" with Kay asking Jolene to clean the floor. Phil walks in and is aroused by Jolene's dancing while cleaning the floor and they have sex. They start a passionate affair, and Phil promises to build a house for the two of them, but asks Jolene to keep their relationship a secret, due to them both being married. Upon catching Phil and Jolene in bed, Kay kicks Jolene out of the house. After a physical altercation with Phil, Mickey drives off and kills himself by jumping off a bridge.

Aunt Kay has Jolene placed in a juvenile mental institution, where she meets Cindy, a psychiatric nurse. Jolene, a talented artist, asks for paper and colored pencils to draw. Her request is denied, but she is allowed crayons, and she starts a small business selling crayon portraits to her fellow patients. Jolene is called to testify against Uncle Phil, and he is sentenced to eighteen months in prison for statutory rape. Cindy, a closeted lesbian, is immediately infatuated with Jolene and this culminates in another affair. Cindy breaks Jolene out of the mental hospital and hides her in her apartment. Using the money from her portraits, Jolene leaves and boards a bus west out of South Carolina. Jolene resorts to hitchhiking further west, supporting herself by prostitution.

Jolene ends up in Arizona, working as a waitress at an outdoor diner. There, she meets Coco Leger, an aspiring musician and tattoo artist. A relationship blossoms between them and Jolene becomes a tattoo artist at Coco's parlor. After two weeks of dating, Jolene moves in with Coco and he convinces her to get married. After he passes out during sex, Coco is revealed to have a cocaine addiction, supporting his habit and the parlor by dealing cocaine. One evening, a young woman enters the parlor and declares herself to be his wife, Marin and introduces their son, Coco Jr. Coco returns and is confronted by both women before he walks out with Marin and the baby. Furious with Coco, Jolene destroys the parlor, dumps the cocaine on a table, steals the drug money and dumps her ring in the center of the cocaine before dialing 911 and fleeing the scene.

Jolene later is in Las Vegas, working as an erotic dancer when she meets Sal Fontaine, a mobster. He takes a liking to her and invites her to quit dancing and move into his high rise condo. Jolene enjoys a life of luxury with Sal, going to fancy dinners and exploring her talent as an artist. One night, Sal demands that Jolene get dressed, go downstairs and wait for him. She falls asleep in the restaurant and quietly returns to the condo to find Sal dead and the mob looking for her. Jolene escapes and ends up hitchhiking on a truck to Tulsa.

In Tulsa, Jolene finds work as a receptionist and banquet server. She meets Brad Benton, the son of a wealthy family. He relentlessly pursues her, sending flowers to her workplace and charming her into dates. Outwardly religious but obnoxiously arrogant, he is rude, entitled, narcissistic and demanding to everyone. Brad pressures Jolene into quickly getting married and on their wedding night, he discovers a tattoo of a heart with flames on her backside, this triggers him and he anally rapes her. When Jolene becomes pregnant, Brad interrogates her on how many people she has had sex with; when she refuses to comply, he slaps her across the face. After their baby is born, Brad's parents investigate Jolene's past and inform him. He then brutally attacks her, permanently damaging her vocal cords. She tries to leave and take Brad Jr., but a domestic violence lawyer refuses to take her case due to her past. While staying in a shelter for battered women, the police come and arrest Jolene for kidnapping and Brad is granted an annulment. Jolene is convicted of the kidnapping and is allowed supervised visits. She decides to exit her baby's life while he is an infant, reasoning that he can imagine his mother to be anybody.

Finally, Jolene ends up in Los Angeles, working as a comic illustrator for a graphic novel company, where she incorporates events from her life into her work. In her final narration, she reveals that she has dreams to be an actress and that a film studio might want to use her. Seeing a woman walking her young son up the street, Jolene imagines herself a famous actress returning to Tulsa in a limousine to visit her son and happily walks out of frame.

== Cast ==
- Jessica Chastain as Jolene
- Frances Fisher as Cindy
- Rupert Friend as Coco Leger
- Dermot Mulroney as Uncle Phil
- Zeb Newman as Mickey
- Chazz Palminteri as Sal Fontaine
- Denise Richards as Marin
- Theresa Russell as Aunt Kay
- Michael Vartan as Brad

Brothers Avi Angel and Asher Angel appeared briefly as Brad Jr. at 7 months and 5 years old, respectively.

== Reception ==
The film received a mixed critical reaction. Rotten Tomatoes gives it a score of 48% based on 21 reviews, with an average rating of 4.89/10.

Jeanette Catsoulis of The New York Times praised Chastain's performance, noting that she "digs deep. Surrendering to her character’s smoky voice-over and disastrous judgment, the actress finds pockets of soul in a role that’s part Jessica Rabbit, part Marilyn Monroe."

Rex Reed of The New York Observer rated the film three out of four stars. Reed praised the casting; "This movie boasts a terrific cast, and Ms. Chastain not only holds her own corner of every scene, she's the only thing you want to watch."
