= Massey Lectures (Harvard University) =

Series of public lectures

The William E. Massey, Sr., Lectures in the History of American Civilization is a series of public lectures held every one or two years at Harvard University since 1984. It is sponsored by the university's Program in the History of American Civilization and was endowed by an anonymous donor in honor of William E. Massey, former president of the A.T. Massey Coal Company.

== Lecturers ==
- 1984 – Eudora Welty, One Writer's Beginnings
- 1986 – Irving Howe, The American Newness: Culture and Politics in the Age of Emerson
- 1988 – Lawrence W. Levine, Highbrow/Lowbrow: The Emergence of Cultural Hierarchy in America
- 1988 – Conor Cruise O'Brien, God Land: Reflections on Religion and Nationalism
- 1990 – David Brion Davis, Revolutions: Reflections on American Equality and Foreign Liberations
- 1992 – Toni Morrison, Playing in the Dark: Whiteness and the Literary Imagination
- 1992 – Gore Vidal, Screening History
- 1994 – Eugene D. Genovese, The Southern Tradition
- 1995 – Alfred Kazin, Writing Was Everything
- 1996 – Stephen L. Carter, The Dissent of the Governed: A Meditation on Law, Religion, and Loyalty
- 1997 – Richard Rorty, Achieving Our Country: Leftist Thought in Twentieth-Century America
- 1999 – Andrew Delbanco, The Real American Dream: A Meditation on Hope
- 2000 – Maxine Hong Kingston To Be the Poet
- 2003 – E. L. Doctorow, Reporting the Universe
- 2004 – Robert Venturi and Denise Scott Brown, Architecture as Signs and Systems: For a Mannerist Time
- 2004 – John Demos, Circles and Lines: The Shape of Life in Early America
- 2005 – Jayati Ghosh, The Economics of the American Empire: Fierceness and Fragility
- 2008 – Joan C. Williams, Obama Eats Arugula: Reshaping the Electoral and Everyday Politics of Work and Family
- 2009 – Eric Foner, The Fiery Trial: Abraham Lincoln and American Slavery
- 2011 – Sally Mann, If Memory Serves
- 2012 – Gish Jen, Tiger Writing: Art, Culture and the Interdependent Self
- 2013 – Greil Marcus, Three Songs, Three Singers, Three Nations
- 2015 – Linda Greenhouse, Just a Journalist: Reflections on Journalism, Life, and the Spaces Between
- 2017 – Winona LaDuke, Climate Change, Indigenous Resistance, and Forging a New Democracy: Thoughts for the Present Moment
