= The Book of Daniel (novel) =

1971 novel by E. L. Doctorow

- First edition
- Author: E. L. Doctorow
- Original title: The Book of Daniel
- Language: English
- Genre: Fiction
- Publisher: Random House
- Publication date: 1971
- Publication place: US
- Media type: Hardcover
- Pages: 303
- ISBN: 978-0-8129-7817-9
- OCLC: 141385012
- LC Class: PS3554.O3 B6 2007

The Book of Daniel (1971) is a semi-historical novel by E. L. Doctorow, loosely based on the lives, trial and execution of Julius and Ethel Rosenberg. Doctorow tells the story of Paul and Rochelle Isaacson (stand-ins for the Rosenbergs) through the persons of their older son, Daniel, and his sister, Susan, who are college students deeply involved in 1960s politics.

== Synopsis ==
Writing his doctoral thesis ('The Book of Daniel'), a political genealogy of the American Old Left, Daniel Isaacson confronts his own personal relationship to that historical narrative by investigating the background to his parents' conviction and execution by the State, with some assistance from his adoptive parents (the Lewins). The dénouement is the revisiting, in flashback, of the death of his parents, Rochelle and Paul Isaacson, and, in due course, the death from nervous disorder (and attempted suicide) of his sister Susan. The novel closes as the library in which Daniel is working is closed by student protests. Doctorow closes his novel with a parody of lines from Chapter 12 of the Biblical Book of Daniel. This moment culminates a merger of the text's two primary levels of narrative concern: Daniel's self-conscious inability to find and tell his own truthful personal history, which mirrors the anxiety of the radical 1960s New Left to emerge from the failure of the Communist Party to achieve its revolutionary potential in the 1950s.

The book is written in four parts, and in each Daniel is the principal narrator; the narrative moves fluidly and rapidly between 1967 ('the present') and flashback (to the late 40s/early 50s), and between first and third person:

1. Memorial Day – Opens, in 1967, with Daniel, his young wife, Phyllis and baby Paul, walking to the sanatorium to see Susan; closes with the dropping of atom bomb in Japan
2. Halloween – closes with the lawyer, Ascher, telling Daniel and Susan of the forthcoming start of the Isaacsons' trial
3. Starfish – closes with Daniel's bruising involvement in an anti-draft march, while his sister (the starfish of the title) is lying dying from complications following her suicide attempt.
Daniel says to Phyllis through broken teeth '...It looks worse than it is. There was nothing to it. It is a lot easier to be a revolutionary nowadays than it used to be.'
4. Christmas – recalls the closing moments of the trial, including the key evidence from their co-accused, Selig Mindish; Daniel's later search for, and discovery of Mindish, now senile, in Disneyland; and the funerals of Daniel's parents and his sister Susan.

== Film, TV or theatrical adaptations ==
The book was adapted as a film, Daniel (1983), directed by Sidney Lumet. Lumet somewhat changes the emphasis of the novel, to concentrate more on the 1940s left-wing politics of the parents. This was an era of which Lumet had close personal experience – the film is generally less well-regarded than the book.

== Allusions to historical events ==
- Neither the book nor the film makes direct reference to the Rosenberg events (though Lumet did claim that the execution scene was 'as it happened').
- The introduction of Susan as the younger child (rather than the second son of the Rosenbergs), and her lingering death, appears to be an attempt to distance the novel from being considered biographical.
- Other key differences include – Rochelle is a college graduate, Paul is not; this is the reverse of the Rosenbergs. Mindish appears to be a fusion of two historical figures, Morton Sobell and David Greenglass.
- A key scene (in part 1), is the family's attendance at the Paul Robeson concert at Peekskill (1949); in the novel Paul leaves the bus to argue with the right-wing protesters and is violently set upon by them.
- Another key scene has Daniel taking part in the 1967 anti-Vietnam war march on the Pentagon.
