= Reporting the Universe =

- Author: E. L. Doctorow
- Language: English
- Genre: History
- Publisher: Harvard University Press
- Publication date: September 30, 2004
- Publication place: United States
- Media type: Print (paperback)
- Pages: 144 pp
- ISBN: 9780674016286

Reporting the Universe is a collection of essays by American novelist E. L. Doctorow. The work includes autobiography, political commentary, and literary criticism, and ranges from topics such as Doctorow's memories as a young writer to post-9/11 American identity. It was originally published by Harvard University Press in 2004 as Book 13 of The William E. Massey Sr. Lectures in the History of American Civilization. The book received favorable comments from reviewers at Financial Times, Booklist, The Chicago Tribune, The New York Review of Books, and Newsday. Publishers Weekly wrote in a review, "Whether he's contemplating the irony of our 'God-soaked country' being officially secular, or his father's love of Edgar Allan Poe, 'our greatest bad writer' (for whom he was named Edgar), or deriding the 'mendacity' of politicians, Doctorow is here, as in his fiction, a wordsmith of the first order. It's a pleasure to read these essays—some autobiographical, some literary, some dealing with issues of the day—full of memorable phrases and evocative images, as well as incisive ideas."
