= Ada (1961 film) =

1961 film directed by Daniel Mann

- Original film poster
- Directed by: Daniel Mann
- Screenplay by: Arthur Sheekman; William Driskill
- Based on: Ada Dallas; 1959 novel by Wirt Williams
- Produced by: Lawrence Weingarten
- Starring: Susan Hayward; Dean Martin; Wilfrid Hyde-White; Ralph Meeker; Martin Balsam
- Cinematography: Joseph Ruttenberg
- Edited by: Ralph E. Winters
- Music by: Bronislau Kaper
- Production companies: Avon Productions; Chalmar Inc.
- Distributed by: Metro-Goldwyn-Mayer
- Release date: August 25, 1961 (US)
- Running time: 109 minutes
- Country: United States
- Language: English
- Box office: $1.5 million

Ada is a 1961 American political drama film produced by Avon Productions and distributed by Metro-Goldwyn-Mayer. It was directed by Daniel Mann and produced by Lawrence Weingarten, with a screenplay by Arthur Sheekman and William Driskill based on the novel Ada Dallas by Wirt Williams.

The film stars Susan Hayward, Dean Martin, Wilfrid Hyde-White, Ralph Meeker and Martin Balsam.

== Plot ==
Bo Gillis is a guitar-playing man from a Southern state who becomes a populist candidate for governor. He is elected after his opponent's wife is revealed to have a dark secret, a fact exposed by Bo's campaign mastermind Sylvester Marin.

Shortly before the election, Bo visits a nightclub, where he meets a prostitute named Ada Dallas. They share a similar upbringing, and Bo feels an immediate bond. They are soon married, which upsets Bo's assistant Steve and Sylvester, who want the marriage annulled.

The Gillises resist and begin life as the state's first couple. Soon the governor finds that he is little more than a stooge, blindly signing documents at Sylvester's behest. His childhood friend Ronnie is dismissed as lieutenant governor for opposing Sylvester. To control Bo, Sylvester requests help from Ada, who demands to be appointed lieutenant governor in return.

Bo is furious with Ada for becoming part of the sordid political scene. After he continues to oppose Sylvester's influence, a bomb explodes in his car, severely injuring him. In the hospital, Bo accuses Ada of conspiring to murder him, and she angrily leaves him.

Ada takes the oath as acting governor but then begins to defy Sylvester, promoting Bo's ideas for honest government. Her former madam tricks her into offering $10,000 to remain quiet about Ada's past.

During a decisive vote at the state capitol, as Bo views from the gallery, Sylvester and his henchman Yancey try to sabotage Ada's plans by revealing her dark secret. Bo delivers an impromptu speech to defend Ada. Sylvester is ruined, and Bo and Ada depart the capitol, reunited.

== Cast ==
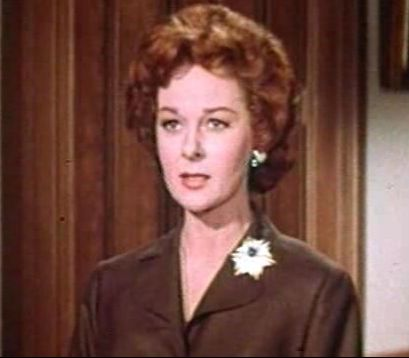
Susan Hayward as Ada Gillis

- Susan Hayward as Ada Gillis
- Dean Martin as Bo Gillis
- Wilfrid Hyde-White as Sylvester Marin
- Ralph Meeker as Col. Yancey
- Martin Balsam as Steve Jackson
- Frank Maxwell as Ronnie Hallerton
- Connie Sawyer as Alice Sweet
- Ford Rainey as Speaker
- Charles Watts as Al Winslow
- Larry Gates as Joe Adams
- Robert S. Simon as Natfield
- Bill Zuckert as Harry Davers
- Nesdon Booth as Walter Dow
- Emory Parnell as Security Guard (uncredited)
- Duke Fishman as Spectator at Rally (uncredited)

== Reception ==
=== Box office ===
According to MGM records, the film lost $2,372,000.
