= Welcome to Hard Times (novel) =

1960 novel by E. L. Doctorow

- First edition
- Author: E. L. Doctorow
- Language: English
- Publisher: Random House
- Publication date: 1960
- Publication place: United States
- Media type: Print (hardcover)

Welcome to Hard Times is the debut novel of American author E. L. Doctorow, published in 1960. It is set in a small settlement in the Dakota Territory named Hard Times. After "The Bad Man from Bodie" arrives in Hard Times and terrorizes the townspeople with rape, murder, and arson, the few survivors work to restore their town. A post-Western, the novel is notable for its exploration of good and evil. It was adapted into a 1967 film of the same name.

== Plot summary ==
When Clay Turner, "The Bad Man from Bodie," arrives in a nameless town in the Dakota Territory, he rapes and kills a woman, causes the deaths of four men, and burns the town to the ground before leaving. Most of the residents flee, leaving Blue (the town's unofficial mayor) to rebuild alongside Molly Riordan (a prostitute) and Jimmy Fee (the young son of one of the murdered men). Blue has hopes of a proper town, so when Zar, a Russian pimp, arrives with intentions to profit from the nearby miners, Blue convinces him and his four soiled doves to set up a saloon and brothel. Blue's plan succeeds, and the town gains a general store, a restaurant, a sheriff, and a name: Hard Times.

Blue begins to view Molly and Jimmy as his family, telling Zar and other arrivals that Molly is his wife and Jimmy is his son. Molly, traumatized by the Man from Bodie and afraid of his return, urges Blue to move the three of them out of Hard Times. Blue refuses, having once again taken an honorary position as the town's mayor. Molly trains Jimmy to act as her protector: she has Jenks, the sheriff, teach him to use a gun. Her fear and bitterness force her into exile and poison all of her relationships with the residents of Hard Times. Blue unsuccessfully tries to pull Jimmy away from Molly's influence.

The mining company promises to build a road through Hard Times but fails to deliver before closing the mine. Clay Turner, "The Bad Man from Bodie," returns. Blue encourages the citizens of Hard Times to leave. Molly convinces Jenks to confront Turner, which results in both Jenks' and Zar's deaths. With the help of Swede, a remaining resident of Hard Times, Blue designs a barbed wire trap for Turner outside of Zar's saloon. Blue shoots Turner in the leg, causing Turner to fall into the wire. In retaliation, Turner kills Swede with a swift shot. Blue beats Turner unconscious and presents him to Molly, while Jimmy stands guard with a shotgun. Molly stabs Turner with her stiletto knife, waking him, and when Turner reaches for Molly, Jimmy fires his shotgun, killing both Turner and Molly. Jimmy runs off. Blue speculates that the boy will become another Bad Man. Though only Blue and Swede’s wife, Helga, remain in Hard Times, Blue cannot bring himself to raze the town because “someone will come by sometime who will want to use the wood.”

== Reception ==
Welcome to Hard Times has received positive reviews from several major publications. Writing for The New York Times, Wirt Williams praised the novel for its examination of immorality, suggesting that "the primary theme of the novel is that evil can only be resisted psychically." For this theme, Wirt related the novel to Joseph Conrad's Heart of Darkness.

=== Analysis ===
The novel's unromanticized depiction of the American West (highlighting violence, failure, and regression) marks it an early example of a post-Western. In Selling the Wild West: Popular Western Fiction, Christine Bold called Welcome to Hard Times an "anti-Western Western."
