= World's Fair (novel) =

1985 novel by E. L. Doctorow

- Paperback edition cover
- Author: E.L. Doctorow
- Language: English
- Genre: Fiction
- Publisher: Random House
- Publication date: October 12, 1985
- Publication place: United States
- Media type: Print (Paperback)
- Pages: 288 pages
- ISBN: 978-0394525280

World's Fair is a 1985 novel by American author E.L. Doctorow. It is a semi-autobiographical story of a boy named Edgar who lives in the Bronx during the late 1930s, and culminates with the 1939 World's Fair. It won the National Book Award in 1986.
