= Playing in the Dark =

1992 work of literary criticism by Toni Morrison

Playing in the Dark: Whiteness and the Literary Imagination
- First edition cover
- Author: Toni Morrison
- Audio read by: Bahni Turpin
- Language: English
- Series: William E. Massey Sr. Lectures in the History of American Civilization
- Subject: Race, American literature, whiteness
- Genre: Literary criticism
- Publisher: Harvard University Press
- Publication date: May 1992
- Publication place: United States
- Pages: 91
- ISBN: 978-0-674-67377-9
- OCLC: 27173949
- LC Class: PS173.N4M67
- Website: Official website

Playing in the Dark: Whiteness and the Literary Imagination is a 1992 work of literary criticism by Toni Morrison. In it, she develops a reading of major white American authors and traces the way their perceptions of blackness gave defining shape to their works, and thus to the American literary canon.

== History ==
In 1990, Morrison delivered a series of three lectures at the William E. Massey Sr. Lectures in American Studies at Harvard University; she then adapted the texts into a 91-page book, Playing in the Dark, published in 1992 by Harvard University Press. The book's three chapters are "Black Matters", "Romancing the Shadow", and "Disturbing Nurses and the Kindness of Sharks".

== Subject matter ==
The book consists of three essays, with their names stylised in lowercase letters:

1. black matters
2. romancing the shadow
3. disturbing nurses and the kindness of sharks

In Playing in the Dark, Morrison develops literary criticism of major white authors like Willa Cather, Edgar Allan Poe, Nathaniel Hawthorne and Ernest Hemingway, tracing the way their work dealt with and was shaped by their handling of the subject of blackness. She finds blackness playing a significant role in structuring these authors' works, and thus the American canon. Writing in the journal Signs, Linda Krumholz described Morrison's project as "reread[ing] the American literary canon through an analysis of whiteness to propose the ways that black people were used to establish American identity."

Reviewing Playing in the Dark in The New York Times in 1992, Wendy Steiner said: "The moral and emotional force of [Morrison's] explorations is apparent. If the American identity is formed against this black shadow, it is a sign of abject weakness and a cause for shame....The genius of Ms. Morrison's approach is to enlist those very describers and imaginers—white men of letters—in an investigation that can end only in their self-indictment." But, Steiner added, "it is also not a mere denunciation of white culture. Instead, it is a self-help project meant both to map out new critical territory and to rearrange the territory within."

Michael Eric Dyson observed in his 1993 book Reflecting Black: African-American Cultural Criticism that in addition to this exploration of the "white literary imagination...Playing in the Dark is also about a black intellectual seizing the interpretive space within a racially ordered hierarchy of cultural criticism. Blacks are usually represented through the lens of white perception rather than the other way around...With [Playing in the Dark], a substantial change is portended."

== Reception ==
In 2016, Time magazine noted that Playing in the Dark was among Morrison's most-assigned texts on U.S. college campuses, together with several of her novels and her 1993 Nobel Prize lecture, making her one of the most-assigned of all female writers.
