= Daniel (1983 film) =

Film directed by Sidney Lumet

- Theatrical release poster
- Directed by: Sidney Lumet
- Screenplay by: E. L. Doctorow
- Based on: The Book of Daniel by E. L. Doctorow
- Produced by: Burtt Harris
- Starring: Timothy Hutton; Mandy Patinkin; Lindsay Crouse; Edward Asner
- Cinematography: Andrzej Bartkowiak
- Edited by: Peter C. Frank
- Music by: Bob James
- Distributed by: Paramount Pictures (United States); Fox-Rank (United Kingdom)
- Release dates: 26 August 1983 (United States); 10 February 1984 (United Kingdom)
- Running time: 129 minutes
- Countries: United Kingdom; United States
- Language: English
- Box office: $687,475

Daniel is a 1983 drama film directed by Sidney Lumet from a screenplay by E. L. Doctorow, based on his 1971 novel The Book of Daniel. The film stars Timothy Hutton, Mandy Patinkin, Lindsay Crouse, and Edward Asner.

Daniel was released in the United States by Paramount Pictures on 26 August 1983 and in the United Kingdom on 10 February 1984.

== Plot ==
The film was based on the life story of Julius and Ethel Rosenberg, who were convicted as spies and executed in the electric chair by the United States government in 1953 for giving nuclear secrets to the Soviet Union. This story follows their fictionalized son as he attempts to find the truth.

== Cast ==
- Timothy Hutton as Daniel Isaacson
- Mandy Patinkin as Paul Isaacson
- Lindsay Crouse as Rochelle Isaacson
- Edward Asner as Jacob Ascher
- Ellen Barkin as Phyllis Isaacson
- Julie Bovasso as Frieda Stein
- Tovah Feldshuh as Linda Mindish
- Carmen Mathews as Mrs. Ascher
- Amanda Plummer as Susan Isaacson
- Lee Richardson as Reporter
- John Rubinstein as Robert Lewin
- Colin Stinton as Dale
- Maria Tucci as Lise Lewin
- Ilan Mitchell-Smith as Young Daniel Isaacson
- Peter Friedman as Ben Cohen
- Will Lee as Judge (posthumously, his last appearance)
- David Margulies as Dr. Duberstein
- Leo Burmester as FBI Agent
- Rosetta LeNoire as Prison Matron
- Ron McLarty as Prison Guard
- Nicholas Saunders as Jail Doctor
- Daniel Stern as Artie Sternlicht
- Lee Wallace as Mayor

== Reception ==
Daniel received mixed reviews, and it was not a box-office success upon its limited release. It currently holds a 43% rating on Rotten Tomatoes.

In The New York Times, film critic Janet Maslin wrote:

[The film] begins with an extreme close-up of a scowling, furious Daniel (Timothy Hutton) as he recites a definition for electrocution, and this device is repeated periodically throughout the film (with Daniel explaining a different form of punishment in each instance). These scenes, which are all that remain of the narrator's tone, effectively capture Daniel's rage - but do not convey that his struggle is painful and continuing, and that he is in the process of change. As a result, much of the movie is angry and self- righteous, without sufficiently close links between Daniel's story and that of his parents, and without the sympathetic elements that make the novel a complex, human story, rather than a tract.
