= Andrew's Brain =

2014 novel by E. L. Doctorow

- Hardcover edition
- Author: E. L. Doctorow
- Language: English
- Genre: Fiction
- Publisher: Random House
- Publication date: January 14, 2014
- Publication place: United States
- Media type: Print, e-book
- Pages: 224 pages
- ISBN: 978-1400068814

Andrew's Brain is a novel written by E. L. Doctorow, published in 2014. It was Doctorow's last novel to appear before his death in 2015.

== Plot ==
Andrew, from a variety of mostly unknown locations, tells the story of his life and the events that have led him to where he has ended up through musings, ramblings, and occasionally fragmented tales. With seemingly no one else in his life, Andrew speaks to a person, presumably a psychiatrist only referred to as "Doc", who often prompts Andrew further into his disjointed narrative. Between tragedies of love, thoughts about what consciousness is, and a series of bad luck incidents, Andrew's story explores the questions of how much control individuals have over their own lives and how much of life is coincidence or fate.

== Characters ==
- Andrew – the novel's namesake and protagonist, a self-described cognitive scientist. Narrating the story, Andrew often switches between first and third person point-of-view storytelling to distance himself from painful memories. Even though he never discloses his current location at any given time while relating the narration, Andrew is speaking to an unknown dialogist only briefly referred to as "Doc." Throughout the novel, Andrew relives his past in non-linear fragments (about his late wife Briony or his acquaintance with the unnamed president of the United States) that eventually come full circle.
- Briony – a bright and ambitious college student who takes one of Andrew's lectures during his time teaching at the collegiate level. After falling in love with Andrew, she becomes pregnant by him and gives birth to a baby girl whom the couple name Willa.
- Doc – While not overly talkative, "Doc" is an unknown speaker with whom Andrew converses frequently. Doc often propels the story forward by prompting questions and commenting about Andrew's stories and ramblings.
- Martha – Andrew's first wife who filed for divorce after their baby died in Andrew's care. Although not as essential to the plot as Doc, Martha assumes the role of Willa's surrogate mother after Briony's fateful death. Andrew, barely able to get through the day taking care of himself, let alone a child, asks Martha to take Willa upon realizing his daughter needs a parent who can capably raise her.

== Critical reception ==
Cunning [and] sly ... This babbling Andrew is a casualty of his times, binding his wounds with thick wrappings of words, ideas, bits of story, whatever his spinning mind can unspool for him. One of the things that makes [Andrew] such a terrific comic creation is that he's both maddeningly self-delusive and scarily self-aware: He's a fool, but he's no innocent.

— The New York Times Book Review

The whole story comes to us as the rambling testimony of a depressed scientist being patiently interviewed, possibly by a government psychiatrist. Andrew flits around the events that led him here — wherever here is: Early in the book he says, "I don't know what I'm doing here," which makes two of us. He sometimes speaks of himself in the third person; he regularly mocks his unnamed interrogator; and he pays no attention to chronology. It's our job to put the tragic incidents of his life in order, to unscramble the taunting clues, to unearth the profundities buried in this misanthropic rumination. "Andrew's Brain" hurt mine. The problem isn't that the novel requires a significant degree of intellectual effort; it's that it doesn't provide sufficient reward for that effort.

— The Washington Post
