= Loon Lake (novel) =

1980 novel by E. L. Doctorow

- First edition
- Author: E. L. Doctorow
- Language: English
- Publisher: Random House
- Publication date: 1980
- Publication place: United States
- Pages: 258
- ISBN: 0-394-50691-X
- OCLC: 5830111
- Dewey Decimal: 813/.54
- LC Class: PS3554.O3 L6

Loon Lake is a 1980 novel by E. L. Doctorow. The plot of the novel is mostly set on Loon Lake in the Adirondacks during the Depression. The novel is one of the more experimental works of Doctorow, incorporating a great variety of different techniques, many of which are used for preventing the reader from an easy understanding of the narration: traditional narratives, stream of consciousness, poetry, mixed up chronology.

Loon Lake of the title is also the name of a retreat for millionaire industrialist F. W. Bennett where the drifter Joe temporarily finds home, after being attacked by the wild dogs surrounding the estate. In Loon Lake Joe finds the other main characters of the novel, Clara who is a woman seen by Joe through the windows of a private railway carriage, and the poet Warren Penfield.

== Critical notes ==
Christopher Lehmann-Haupt of The New York Times noted: "So, in a way, it is two books we have to read – the existential adventure we get the first time through, and the tract on history we perceive when we read again knowing the outcome. But if to some degree these two books cancel one another out, they also work together to create the portrait of a new kind of American hero – a portrait rich in its psychology and historical nuance, and subtle in the imagery evoked by that isolated paradise in the Adirondacks. It tells us about love and sex and money and desire. It tells us as much about ourselves as Theodore Dreiser did."

Kirkus Reviews stated that: "Imagine a fair-to-good novel by Kurt Vonnegut in his more socio-economic, Mr. Rosewater-ish vein. Then imagine that it's been scrambled, weighed down with self-conscious prose, and avant-garded up (Joycean run-ons, blank verse, skewed tenses and pronouns) by someone intent on making a literary impression. That, unfortunately, is the general effect of this artful but lifeless picaresque novel – which follows the crossing 1936 paths of a very young vagabond and a somewhat older failed-poet, both of whom love a tormented beauty and both of whom wind up under the wing of a great tycoon".
