= Sweet Land Stories =

2004 short story collection by E. L. Doctorow

- First edition
- Author: E. L. Doctorow
- Language: English
- Genre: Short story collection
- Publisher: Random House
- Publication date: 2004
- Publication place: United States
- Media type: Print (hardback)
- Pages: 146
- ISBN: 978-1-4000-6204-1

Sweet Land Stories is a collection of short fiction by E. L. Doctorow published in 2004 by Random House.

== Stories ==
- "A House on the Plains" (The New Yorker, June 18, 2001)
- "Baby Wilson" (The New Yorker, March 25, 2002)
- "Jolene: A Life" (The New Yorker, December 23/30, 2002)
- "Walter John Harmon" (The New Yorker, May 12, 2003)
- "Child, Dead, In the Rose Garden" (Virginia Quarterly Review, Spring 2004)

== Reception ==
New York Times literary critic Kakutani, Michiko considers these tales less "full-fledged stories" than mere sketches for proposed film adaptions.

The people in these stories tend to be paper doll creations: flat, one-dimensional and painted in one or two primary colors...for the most part these stories do not unfold to make a larger point. Nor do they provide the reader with glimpses of their characters' inner lives or wider vistas of the worlds they inhabit."

Reviewer Colin Greenland at The Guardian credits Doctorow for his "dirty realism" reminiscent of works by Raymond Carver, Jayne Anne Phillips and Tobias Wolff.

The subtlety of Doctorow's imagination is delightful, but also moral. By identifying each character's problems from their own viewpoint, in their own terms, he invests them all with intelligence, with subjectivity.

== Theme ==
"[O]n the whole, these stories feel vital and genuine. In most of Sweet Land Stories Doctorow has produced dispatches from life as it is in the United States, where muddy thinking is almost everywhere, where the most limited ambitions are thwarted and where people do not do well at avoiding abuse woven into the fabric of society." - Critic Sandy English, WSWS, May 9, 2006

Publishers Weekly reminds readers that the title of the collection is an exercise in irony, as the life of the protagonists in the five stories are anything but "sweet": each experiences acute suffering inflicted by social malfunctions. While Doctorow exposes "the failures of the American dream" he adroitly "captures the resilience of those who won't accept defeat.

Literary critic Peter Wolfe in Prairie Schooner cautions that Doctorow's characters, despite their difficulties, "aren't to be pitied or patronized."

These Sweetlanders belong in the tradition of American grotesques found in Sherwood Anderson, William Faulkner, and Carson McCullers, and they suffer the same knocks trying to find themselves in the world."

Reviewer Sandy English at the World Socialist Web Site stresses the historical context in which the stories arose, particularly the 9/11 and the US 2003 invasion of Iraq. Despite the social anxieties and political disorientation that accompanied these events, Doctorow's volume "has pierced somewhat the shadow that official society has cast over life in America."

== Sources ==
- Doctorow, E. L. 2004. Sweet Land Stories. Random House, New York. ISBN 978-1-4000-6204-1
- English, Sandy. 2006. Some insights into American life as it is: Doctorow's Sweet Land Stories. WSWS, May 9, 2006. https://www.wsws.org/en/articles/2006/05/doct-m09.html Accessed September 30, 2025.
- Greenland, Colin. 2007. An Impoverished Country. The Guardian, February 3, 2007.https://www.theguardian.com/books/2007/feb/03/featuresreviews.guardianreview17 Accessed October 2, 2025.
- Kakutani, Michiko. 2004. BOOKS OF THE TIMES; Dreamers Awaken: Pages From a Storyteller's Sketchbook. New York Times, May 11, 2004. https://www.nytimes.com/2004/05/11/books/books-of-the-times-dreamers-awaken-pages-from-a-storyteller-s-sketchbook.html Accessed October 2, 2025.
- Wolfe, Peter. 2006. Sweet Land Stories by E. L. Doctorow Prairie Schooner, Vol. 80, No. 1 (Spring 2006), pp. 206–207 University of Nebraska Press https://www.jstor.org/stable/40638303 Accessed 30 September 2025.
