= All the Time in the World (book) =

2011 collection of short stories by E.L. Doctorow

All the Time in the World : New and Selected Stories
- Author: E. L. Doctorow
- Language: English
- Genre: Short Story Collection
- Publisher: Random House
- Publication date: March 22, 2011
- Publication place: United States
- Media type: Print (Hardcover)
- Pages: 304
- ISBN: 978-1-4000-6963-7
- LC Class: PS3554.O3 A79 2011

All the Time in the World: New and Selected Stories is a collection of short stories by American author E.L. Doctorow. This book was first published in 2011 by Random House.

== The stories ==
The twelve (12) stories in this collection appear in the following sequence:

- "Wakefield"
- "Edgemont Drive"
- "Assimilation"
- "Liner Notes: The Songs of Billy Bathgate"
- "Heist"
- "Walter John Harmon"
- "A House on the Plains"
- "Jolene: A Life"
- "The Writer in the Family"
- "Willi"
- "The Hunter"
- "All the Time in the World"

== Background ==
- The first three stories in this collection ("Wakefield," "Edgemont Drive," and "Assimilation") first appeared in The New Yorker.
- "Heist" was published in The New Yorker and was later adapted for the Doctorow novel City of God (2000).
- "All the Time in the World" was published in The Kenyon Review.
- An earlier version of "Liner Notes: The Songs of Billy Bathgate" appeared in The New American Review.
- "Walter John Harmon," "A House on the Plains," and "Jolene: A Life," were first published in The New Yorker and were later included in Doctorow's story collection Sweet Land Stories.
- "The Writer in the Family," was first published in Esquire; "Willi," first appeared in The Atlantic. Along with the story "The Hunter", these three stories were included in Doctorow's book Lives of the Poets.

== Reception ==
Christian Williams for The A.V. Club gives the collection an A− grade saying: "While the abruptness of the stories' conclusions go from rattling to occasionally repetitive, though, the openings are always fresh, as Doctorow skillfully shifts perspective and style to better examine how the same weaknesses that make us human can also rob us of our humanity." Jess Row in The New York Times is not impressed, writing: "Doctorow's novels tend to follow a deductive logic, beginning with the great themes of an era (or simply with a set of historical facts) and then dramatizing them in an interwoven ensemble of characters. Without a substantial dose of irony, short stories don't work that way; the heavy-handedness of the novelist smashes them flat." David L. Ulin for the Los Angeles Times sees some value in mixing the older stories with the new: "this too is in the nature of a new and selected, to operate as a bit of a grab bag, and in so doing to let us read the work anew. To be sure, that's the case with the six older stories, which trace, with grace and acuity, the tension between longing and obligation, between who we are and who we mean to be."
