= Ragtime (novel) =

1975 novel by E. L. Doctorow

- First edition cover
- Author: E. L. Doctorow
- Cover artist: Paul Bacon
- Language: English
- Genre: Historical novel
- Publisher: Random House
- Publication date: 1975
- Publication place: United States
- Media type: Print (hardback and paperback)
- Pages: 270 pp
- ISBN: 0-394-46901-1
- OCLC: 1273581
- Dewey Decimal: 813/.5/4
- LC Class: PZ4.D6413 Rag PS3554.O3

Ragtime is a 1975 historiographic metafiction novel by American author E. L. Doctorow. The novel mixes historical figures and fictional characters together in a sweeping narrative set in the New York City area from 1902 to 1915. With its layered storyline, Ragtime explores themes of racial injustice, class division, and the American Dream in American society.

Though the novel stirred some controversy over the creative liberties Doctorow took depicting historical figures, Ragtime was critically acclaimed upon release, winning the National Book Critics Circle Award for fiction in 1975. Since its release, Ragtime has been cited as one of the best English-language novels, ranking number 86 among Modern Library's 100 Best Novels. In 1998, Time magazine included Ragtime in its unranked list of the 100 Best English-Language Novels from 1923 to 2005.

A film adaptation was released in 1981, and a musical adaptation premiered in 1996 in Toronto, Canada, before a run on Broadway beginning in 1998.

== Plot ==
The novel centers on a wealthy family living in New Rochelle, New York, referred to as Father, Mother, Mother's Younger Brother, Grandfather, and 'the little boy', Father and Mother's young son. The family business is the manufacture of flags and fireworks, an easy source of wealth due to the national enthusiasm for patriotic displays. Father joins Robert Peary's expedition to the North Pole, and his return sees a change in his relationship with his wife, who has experienced independence in his absence. Mother's Younger Brother is a genius at explosives and fireworks but is an insecure, unhappy character who chases after love and excitement. He becomes obsessed with the notorious socialite Evelyn Nesbit, stalking her and embarking on a brief, unsatisfactory affair with her.

Into this insecure setup comes an abandoned black child, then his severely depressed mother, Sarah. Coalhouse Walker Jr., the child's father, visits regularly to win Sarah's affections. A professional musician, well-dressed and well-spoken, he gains the family's respect and overcomes their prejudice initially by playing ragtime music on their piano. Things go well until he is humiliated by a racist fire crew, led by Will Conklin, who vandalize Coalhouse's Model T Ford. He begins a pursuit of redress by legal action but discovers he cannot hope to win because of the inherent prejudice of the system. Sarah is killed in an attempt to aid him, and Coalhouse uses the money he was saving for their wedding to pay for an extravagant funeral.

Having exhausted legal resources, Coalhouse begins killing firemen and bombing firehouses to force the city to meet his demands: that his Model T be restored to its original condition and Conklin be turned over to him for justice. Mother unofficially adopts Sarah and Coalhouse's neglected child over Father's objections, putting strain on their marriage. With a group of angry young men, all of whom refer to themselves as "Coalhouse Walker", Coalhouse continues his vigilante campaign and is joined by Younger Brother, who brings his knowledge of explosives. Coalhouse and his gang storm the Morgan Library, taking the priceless collection hostage and wiring the building with dynamite. Father is drawn into the escalating conflict as a mediator, as is Booker T. Washington. Coalhouse agrees to exchange Conklin's life for safe passage for his men, who leave in his restored Model T. Coalhouse is shot as he surrenders to the authorities. Younger Brother escapes to Mexico and dies fighting with Zapata's forces during the Revolution.

Interwoven with this story is a depiction of life in the tenement slums of New York city, focused on an Eastern European Jewish immigrant referred to as Tateh, who struggles to support himself and his daughter after driving her mother off for accepting money for sex with her employer. The girl's beauty attracts the attention of Evelyn Nesbit, who provides financial support. When Tateh learns who Nesbit really is, however, he takes his daughter out of the city.

Tateh is a talented artist and earns a living cutting out novelty paper silhouettes on the street. He tries working in a factory, where he experiences a successful workers' strike, but becomes disillusioned when he sees it change little about the workers' lives, although in the final chapter he still describes himself as a socialist. He starts making and selling moving picture books to a novelty toy company, becoming a pioneer of animation in the motion picture industry. Tateh becomes wealthy and styles himself "the Baron" to move more easily through high society. He meets and falls in love with Mother, who marries him after Father is killed in the sinking of the RMS Lusitania. They adopt each other's children, as well as Coalhouse's son, and move to California.

Mixed into the interwoven stories are subplots following prominent figures of the day, including those named above as well as in the Historical figures section below.

== Themes ==
The overarching theme that looms over the narrative encompassed the driving motivations of the characters in Ragtime. Not every character that aspired for the American Dream was allowed to achieve this goal. Two of the fictional characters, Tateh and Coalhouse Walker Jr., were given different treatment. Tateh was permitted a better life than the one given to him as a Jewish immigrant, meanwhile Coalhouse was denied the same happiness. “In an era of rapid change and urbanization, the dream is more available to those who can metamorphosize themselves, both by transforming their talents into something the era appreciates and by transforming themselves into acceptable personages.”

Women in Ragtime show one of the many changes that were occurring in the turn of the century. Two of the prominent women in the novel are Mother, who experiences one of the greater character growths in the narrative, as well as Sarah, an African American woman whose impact shifts the second half of the novel. Each woman present embodies some form of the societal constraints and movements that were occurring in part by the men of the era and those in their lives. "Thus, characterization in Ragtime functions as a tool to expose the oppression, and, at times, violence that women faced at the turn of the century and which intersects with racial and class discrimination."

Coalhouse Walker Jr. and Sarah both are placed at the center of the challenged freedoms and justice given to many African Americans and other minorities of the era. Coalhouse, when introduced, presents himself outside of the established norms expected of the time and as a result he is denied his happiness with Sarah and the justice he asks for. This then leads him backed into a corner as he places pressure on the injustice he and Sarah received, and is left with little escape from the norms. "Ragtime changes in both shape and mood in its second half, abandoning the pinwheeling movement among many perspectives and anecdotes for one story — the tragedy of Coalhouse Walker Jr. — which flies like an arrow toward its target, and from which we are not permitted to look away."

In nearly every aspect of Ragtime, class and societal identity claims a part of the narrative and the motivations of the characters present in the novel. One of the characters that is at the forefront of this is Tateh, a Jewish immigrant with a young daughter. For much of the beginning of the novel, Tateh is placed as the contrast of Evelyn Nesbit's high-class world, but as society changes, so does he. By the end, Tateh becomes what he dreamed of and creates the better life for himself and his daughter; however, it comes at the cost of his old life as an immigrant and casting away his previous identity and becoming the Baron Ashkenazy. "In his new life as a filmmaker, the Baron has accepted a vision of America that silences and erases his previous life as Tateh, the street artist. His movies readily conform to the official version of American society in the Ragtime era."

== Historical figures ==
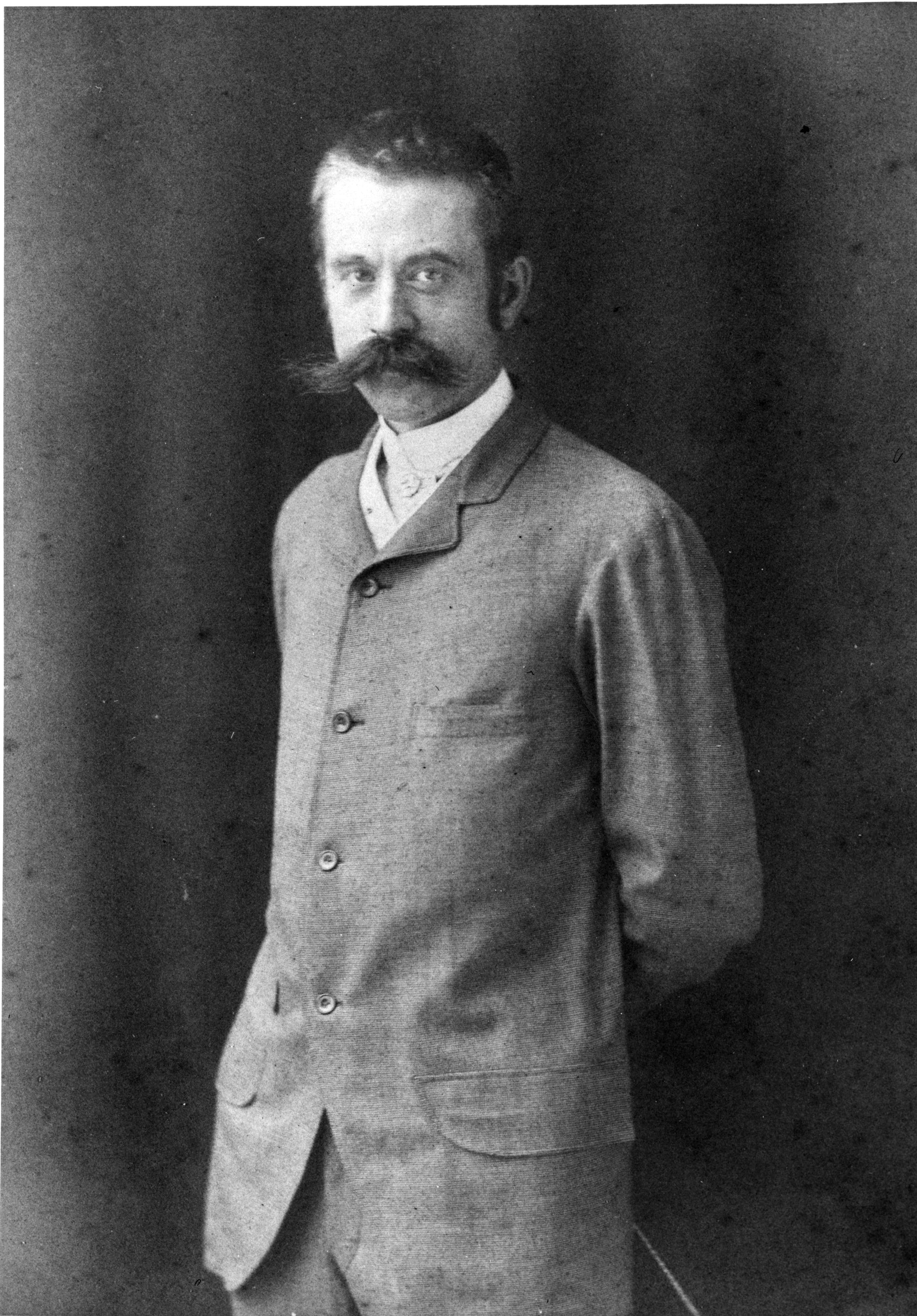
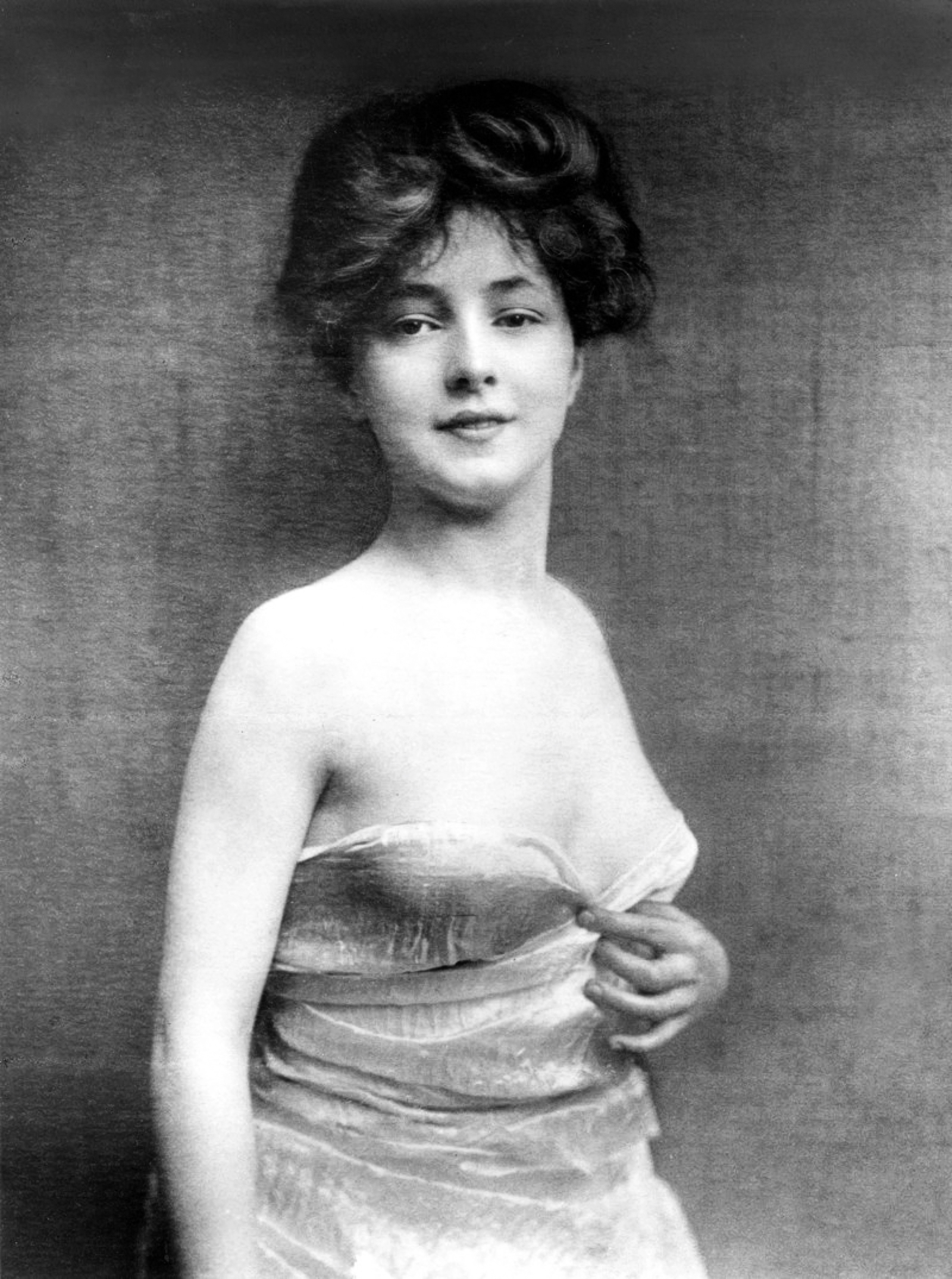
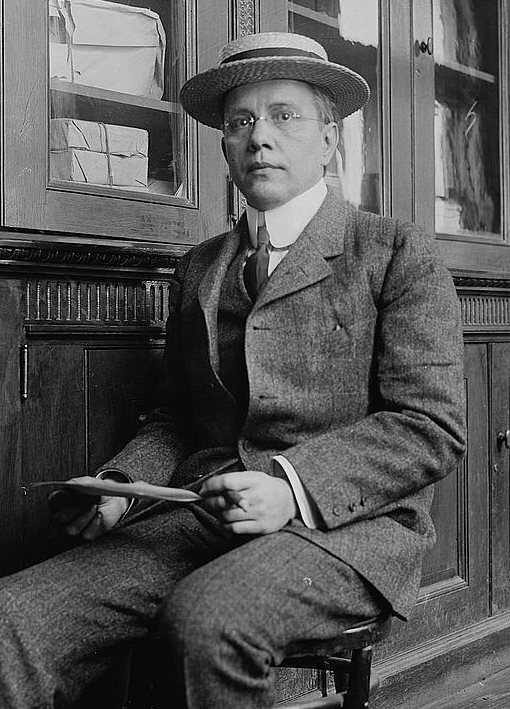
Stanford White (first), Evelyn Nesbit (second) and Harry Thaw (third)

The novel is unique for the way that historical figures and fictional characters are woven into the narrative, making for surprising connections and linking different events and trains of thought about fame and success, on the one hand, and poverty and racism on the other. For example, the black moderate politician Booker T. Washington, tries to negotiate with Coalhouse Walker without success.

Harry Houdini plays an incidental yet prominent part, reflecting on success and mortality. As his success grows, he becomes increasingly depressed and believes his work is ultimately meaningless. After his mother's death, he becomes obsessed with exposing fraudulent occultism, while secretly longing to find a true mystic experience.

Arch-capitalist financier J. P. Morgan, pursuing his complex delusions of grandeur, becomes obsessed with reincarnation and Egyptian mysticism, and finds an unexpected kindred spirit in the down-to-earth Henry Ford. Traveling to Egypt hoping for a vision of his grand destiny, Morgan only dreams of a past life as an ordinary peddler.

Socialite Evelyn Nesbit, desperate to escape the press, becomes involved with Tateh and takes it on herself to care for his daughter. Upon meeting the anarchist agitator Emma Goldman, her identity is exposed and Tateh leaves her. Emma gives Evelyn comfort and guidance on how to free herself from the domination of men. Later, Younger Brother encounters Goldman, who advises him to move beyond his obsession with Evelyn.

Other historical characters mentioned include:

- the polar explorer Robert Peary and his black assistant Matthew Henson
- the architect Stanford White
- Nesbit's mentally unbalanced husband Harry Kendall Thaw, who murdered White for allegedly sexually assaulting Nesbit when she was 15
- Archduke Franz Ferdinand of Austria
- Countess Sophie Chotek
- Sigmund Freud, who rides the Tunnel of Love at Coney Island with Carl Jung
- Theodore Dreiser
- Jacob Riis
- General Tom Thumb and Lavinia Warren
- John Brown (briefly recounted)
- the Mexican revolutionary Emiliano Zapata, with whom Younger Brother eventually joins forces

Two real-life New York City officials also appear in the book: Manhattan District Attorney Charles S. Whitman and Police Commissioner Rhinelander Waldo.

== Historical context ==
Ragtime is set during the Progressive Era, a period in United States history that spanned from the 1890s to the early 1920s. The era was defined by industrial expansion, political reform efforts, and debates over the role of government in regulating corporations and protecting workers. Although reformers promoted ideas of social progress, racial discrimination and violence remained widespread. The novel situates its characters within this historical context, highlighting the gap between the rhetoric of reform and the limited justice available to marginalized communities.

American urbanism boomed during this time period. The influx of the population was great due much to the increased immigrant population, which has special representation in this novel. Jacob Riis was a real person who existed and went and took pictures of the extremely poor living situations of these immigrants. Their struggle to pursue a better life but falling into poverty and hardship was prevalent as they found themselves in poorer conditions than they likely expected when coming to America. While this novel offers the perspective of these immigrants, it also gives a possible glance into the mindset of wealthy tycoons like Henry Ford and J.P. Morgan might have had in considering the work force that fed their wealth.

One must also consider the historical reference of ragtime music, which was a popular form during this era where the pianist uses one hand to maintain a steady rhythm while the other hand plays a more sporadic beat. The quote at the beginning of the novel is by Scott Joplin, who was coined as the "King of Ragtime". The mechanisms of ragtime music are meant to complement the desire for stability while living in the midst of the Progressive Era.

== Literary period ==
Ragtime has been identified as an example of the Post Modern Literary Period. Post Modernism is defined as “a late 20th-century movement characterized by broad skepticism, subjectivism, or relativism; a general suspicion of reason; and an acute sensitivity to the role of ideology in asserting and maintaining political and economic power.” Literary critics have argued that Ragtime reflects many key elements of postmodernism, particularly in its treatment of history as a constructed narrative, not an objective truth. The novels use of different perspectives have been noted to display the postmodern belief that reality cannot be fully represented, but depends on interpretation.

Scholars have also noted the novels use of Postmodernism in blurring lines between reality and fiction. The novel uses both historical and fictional characters. Many of the events in the story are based or inspired by real events, while others are fictional. Coalhouse Walker's story about fighting for justice and against racism is a fictional story that reflects broader social realities. As one critic observes; “Doctorow’s affinities with postmodernism also become clear in Ragtime’s attitude towards history, reality and fiction; in the novel, the confusion of the fact with its model seems to point to the postmodern notion that the real and the imaginary are no longer distinguishable.” This blending of history and fiction in Ragtime has been noted to display history as fragmented and complicated, rather than objective.

In his essay False Documents, Doctorow writes “there is no fiction or non-fiction as we commonly understand the distinction: there is only narrative," a statement that is cited in discussions of the novel's post-modern qualities.

== Influences ==
The name Coalhouse Walker is a reference to the 1811 German novella Michael Kohlhaas by Heinrich von Kleist. Doctorow called Ragtime a "quite deliberate hommage" to Kleist's story.

== Recognition ==
The novel was a nominee for the Nebula Award for Best Novel and won the National Book Critics Circle Award for fiction in 1975, and the American Academy and Institute of Arts and Letters Award in 1976.

The 1991 Fredric Jameson book Postmodernism, or, the Cultural Logic of Late Capitalism considers Doctorow's Ragtime to illustrate the crisis of historiography and a resistance to interpretation.

== Adaptations ==
The novel was adapted to film by the same name in 1981 directed by Miloš Forman.

The 1998 musical, by Terrence McNally (book) Stephen Flaherty and Lynn Ahrens (music and lyrics) debuted on Broadway to great acclaim and won four Tony Awards.

Ragtime was brought to the stage again in the 2025 Broadway musical, featuring Joshua Henry as Coalhouse Walker Jr., Caissie Levy as Mother, and Tony winner Brandon Uranowitz as Tateh. Henry and Levy each won Tony awards for their performances. The production premiered on September 26 at the Vivian Beaumont Theater and received the Tony award for Best Revival.
