= E. L. Doctorow =

American novelist and editor (1931–2015)

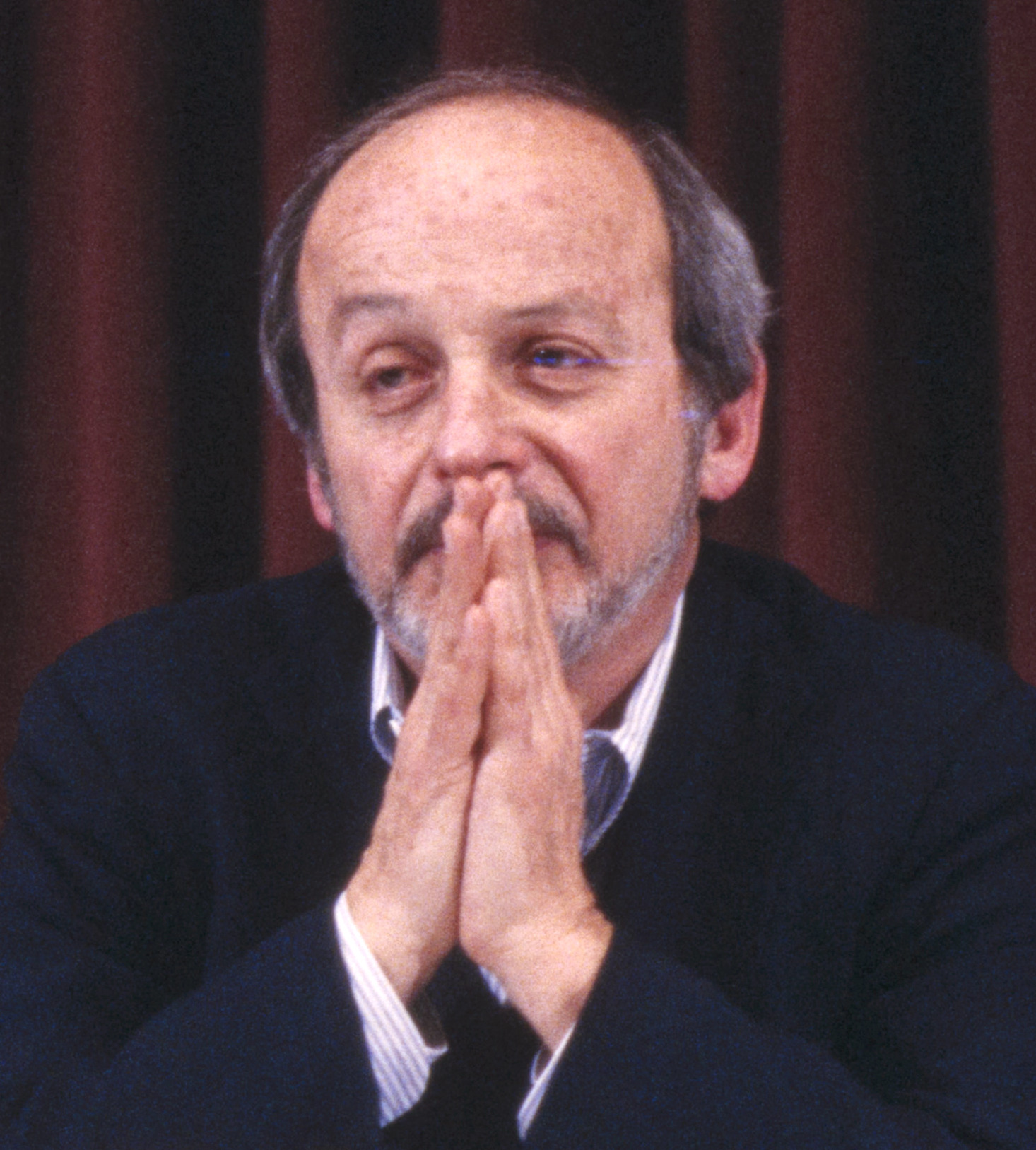
- Doctorow in 1986
- Born: Edgar Lawrence Doctorow; January 6, 1931; New York City, U.S.
- Died: July 21, 2015 (aged 84); New York City, U.S.
- Education: Kenyon College (BA); Columbia University
- Occupations: Writer; editor; professor
- Spouse: Helen Setzer (m. 1953)
- Children: 3
- Writing career
- Notable works: The Book of Daniel; Ragtime; World's Fair; Billy Bathgate; The March; Homer & Langley

Edgar Lawrence Doctorow (January 6, 1931 – July 21, 2015) was an American novelist, editor, and professor, known for his historical fiction. He wrote three volumes of short fiction, a stage drama, and twelve novels, including the award-winning Ragtime (1975), Billy Bathgate (1989), and The March (2005). Like many of his other works, these placed fictional characters in recognizable historical contexts with known historical figures, and used various narrative styles. His stories were recognized for their originality and versatility, and Doctorow was praised for his audacity and imagination.

Several of Doctorow's novels and short stories were adapted into films, including Welcome to Hard Times (1967), starring Henry Fonda; Daniel (1983), starring Timothy Hutton; Billy Bathgate (1991), starring Dustin Hoffman; Jolene (2008), starring Jessica Chastain; and Wakefield (2016), starring Bryan Cranston. The most popular adaptations were the film Ragtime (1981) and its eponymous Broadway musical (1998), which won four Tony Awards. (Note: The film version of Ragtime did not use the screenplay adaptation that Doctorow wrote. According to the publisher's note for Three Screenplays, Doctorow wrote screenplay adaptations of three of his works― The Book of Daniel, Ragtime, and Loon Lake: "Each of these screenplays has undergone a different fate. Doctorow's script for Daniel was made into a feature film by director Sidney Lumet in 1983. The monumental Ragtime screenplay he wrote for director Robert Altman was to have been filmed as either a six-hour feature film or a ten-hour television series. When Altman was replaced on the project by Milos Forman, a shorter, more conventional script was commissioned from another writer. In 1981, Doctorow adapted Loon Lake, but this challenging work has yet to be filmed.")

Doctorow received many awards, including the National Book Critics Circle Award three times (for Ragtime, Billy Bathgate, and The March). He was shortlisted for the 2009 Man Booker International Prize. At the time of his death, President Barack Obama called him "one of America's greatest novelists".

== Early life ==
Doctorow was born on January 6, 1931, in the Bronx, the son of Rose (Levine) and David Richard Doctorow, second-generation Americans of Russian Jewish descent who named him after Edgar Allan Poe. His father ran a small music shop. Doctorow grew up in Claremont, Bronx and attended city public grade schools and the Bronx High School of Science, where he wrote for the school literary magazine, Dynamo, which first published his work. He then enrolled in a journalism class to increase his opportunities to write.

Doctorow attended Kenyon College, where he studied with John Crowe Ransom, acted in college theater productions, and majored in philosophy. He also joined the Middle Kenyon Association and befriended Richard H. Collin. After graduating with honors in 1952, he completed a year of graduate work in English drama at Columbia University before being drafted into the U.S. Army during the Korean War. In 1954 and 1955, he served as a corporal in the Signal Corps in West Germany.

Back in New York after military service, Doctorow worked as a reader for a motion picture company. Reading so many Westerns inspired his first novel, Welcome to Hard Times. Begun as a parody of western fiction, it evolved into a reclamation of the genre. It was published to positive reviews in 1960, with Wirt Williams of The New York Times calling it "taut and dramatic, exciting and successfully symbolic".

When asked how he decided to become a writer, Doctorow said: "I was a child who read everything I could get my hands on. Eventually, I asked of a story not only what was to happen next, but how is this done? How am I made to live from words on a page? And so I became a writer."

== Career ==
"When you'd read Edgar's manuscripts, it was done. That's just the kind of writer he was; he got everything right the first time. I can't think of any editorial problem we had. Even remotely. Nothing."

— Jason Epstein, Doctorow's book editor

To support his family, Doctorow spent nine years as a book editor, first at New American Library, working with Ian Fleming and Ayn Rand, among others.

From 1964 to 1969, Doctorow worked under the New American Library as the editor in chief of The Dial Press, a publishing branch of the company. He published writers such as James Baldwin, Norman Mailer, Ernest J. Gaines, and William Kennedy, before leaving the company in 1971 to write The Book of Daniel. During this time he published his second novel, Big As Life (1966), which he denied permission to republish in the future. (Note: Though Doctorow believed that Big as Life was a failure, in a 1991 interview he said he thought he could fix the novel and "make it work," implying that he wouldn't let it back in print until it was revised.)

In 1969, Doctorow left publishing to pursue a writing career. He accepted a position as Visiting Writer at the University of California, Irvine, where he completed The Book of Daniel (1971), a freely fictionalized consideration of the trial and execution of Julius and Ethel Rosenberg for giving nuclear secrets to the Soviet Union during the Cold War. It was widely acclaimed, called a "masterpiece" by The Guardian, and said by Christopher Lehmann-Haupt in The New York Times to have launched Doctorow into "the first rank of American writers".

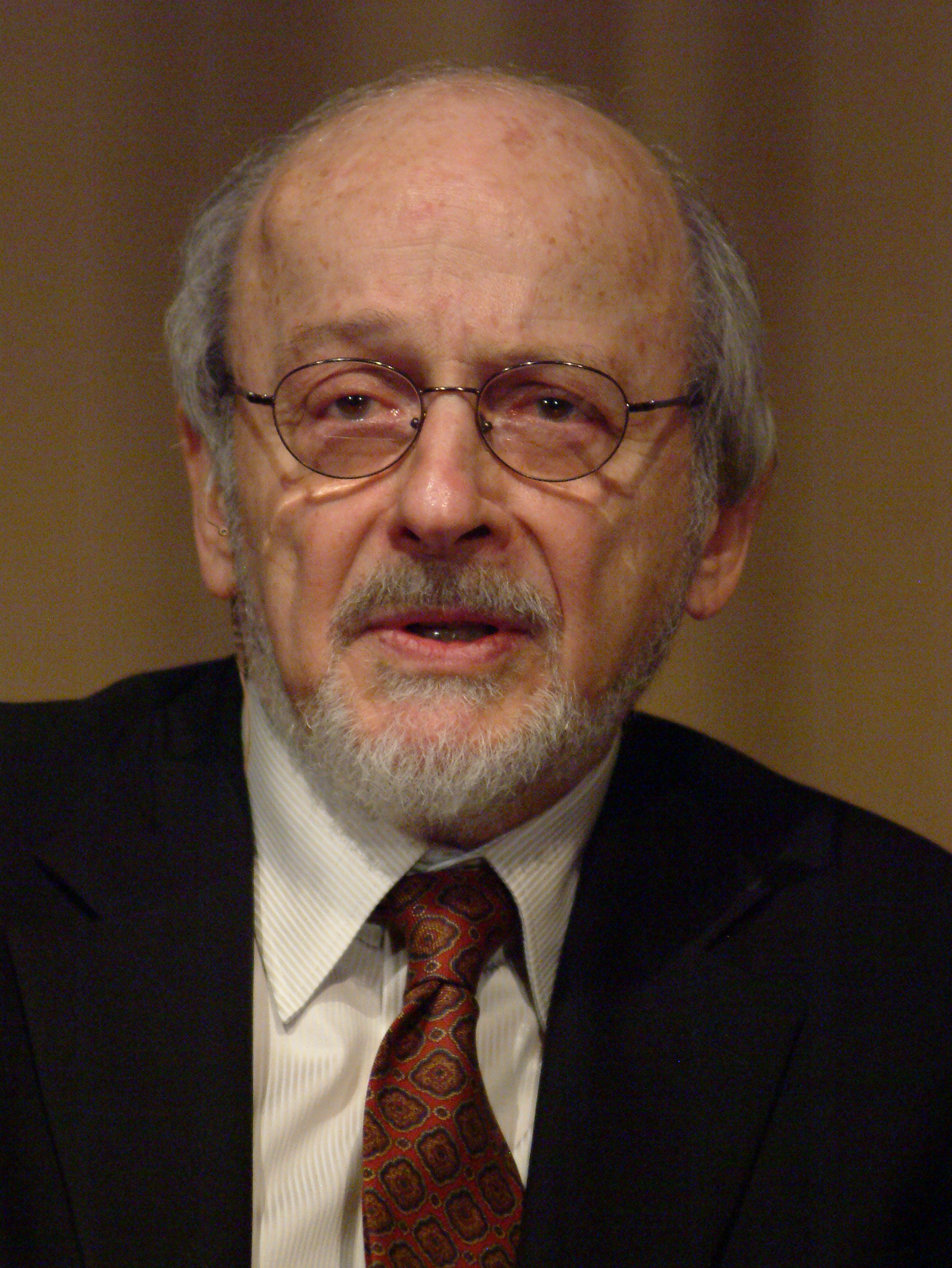
Doctorow in 2008

Doctorow's next book, written in his home in New Rochelle, New York, was Ragtime (1975), later named one of the 100 best novels of the 20th century by the Modern Library editorial board. His subsequent work includes the award-winning novels World's Fair (1985), Billy Bathgate (1989), and The March (2005), as well as several volumes of essays and short fiction.

Novelist Jay Parini has commended Doctorow's skill at writing fictionalized history in a unique style, "a kind of detached but arresting presentation of history that mingled real characters with fictional ones in ways that became his signature manner". In Ragtime, for example, Sigmund Freud and Carl Jung share a ride at Coney Island, and Henry Ford meets J. P. Morgan.

Despite the immense research Doctorow did to create stories based on real events and real characters, reviewer John Brooks wrote that they are nevertheless "alive enough never to smell the research in old newspaper files that they must have required". Doctorow demonstrated in most of his novels "that the past is very much alive, but that it's not easily accessed", Parini wrote. "We tell and retell stories, and these stories illuminate our daily lives. He showed us again and again that our past is our present, and that those not willing to grapple with 'what happened' will be condemned to repeat its worst errors."

Doctorow's fiction combines deeply traditional writing with historical exploration. Although he was called a political novelist, Doctorow rejected this label because he did not believe that the language of politics fit into the complexity of fiction. Doctorow called such labels a distraction and the "paradox of his career".

== Personal life and death ==
In 1954, Doctorow married fellow Columbia University student Helen Esther Setzer while serving in the U.S. Army in West Germany. The couple had three children.

Doctorow also taught at Sarah Lawrence College, the Yale School of Drama, the University of Utah, the University of California, Irvine, and Princeton University. He was the Loretta and Lewis Glucksman Professor of English and American Letters at New York University. In 2001, he donated his papers to NYU's Fales Library. The library's director, Marvin Taylor, called Doctorow "one of the most important American novelists of the 20th century".

In his later years, Doctorow focused on lecturing on his experience of academia and how to construct literature through the lens of historical context. In 2011, he spoke at Saint Francis University about failure and authenticity in his work. In 2012, he spoke at City University of New York about the effectiveness of non-linear narratives.

Doctorow died of lung cancer on July 21, 2015, aged 84, in Sutton Place, Manhattan. He is interred in Woodlawn Cemetery in the Bronx.

Doctorow was a member of the Writers and Artists for Peace in the Middle East, a pro-Israel group. In 1984, he signed a letter protesting German arms sales to Saudi Arabia.

== Awards and honors ==
- 1975: National Book Critics Circle Award for Ragtime
- 1986: National Book Award for World's Fair
- 1988: Golden Plate Award of the Academy of Achievement
- 1989: Edith Wharton Citation of Merit for Fiction
- 1989 MacDowell Colony Fellowship
- 1990: National Book Critics Circle Award for Billy Bathgate
- 1990: PEN/Faulkner Award for Billy Bathgate
- 1990: William Dean Howells Medal for Billy Bathgate
- 1998: National Humanities Medal from the National Endowment for the Humanities
- 1998: Helmerich Award from the Tulsa City-County Library
- 1999: the F. Scott Fitzgerald Award for Achievement in American Literature, which is given annually to recognize outstanding achievement in American literature at the F. Scott Fitzgerald Literary Festival in Rockville, Maryland, where Fitzgerald, his wife, and his daughter are buried.
- 2002: First recipient of the Kenyon Review Award for Literary Achievement
- 2005: National Book Critics Circle Award for The March
- 2006: PEN/Faulkner Award for Fiction for The March
- 2007: Membership to the American Philosophical Society
- 2008: St. Louis Literary Award from the Saint Louis University Library Associates
- 2012: Inducted into the New York State Writers Hall of Fame
- 2012: PEN/Saul Bellow Award for Achievement in American Fiction
- 2013: Medal for Distinguished Contribution to American Letters from the National Book Foundation
- 2013: American Academy of Arts and Letters Gold Medal for Fiction
- 2014: Library of Congress Prize for American Fiction

== Works ==
=== Novels ===
- 1960: Welcome to Hard Times – adapted as the 1967 film Welcome to Hard Times
- 1966: Big As Life
- 1971: The Book of Daniel – historical fiction about Julius and Ethel Rosenberg – adapted as the 1983 film Daniel
- 1975: Ragtime – adapted as the 1981 film Ragtime and the 1998 Broadway musical Ragtime
- 1980: Loon Lake
- 1985: World's Fair
- 1989: Billy Bathgate – adapted as the 1991 film Billy Bathgate
- 1994: The Waterworks
- 2000: City of God
- 2005: The March
- 2009: Homer & Langley
- 2014: Andrew's Brain

=== Short story collections ===
- 1984: Lives of the Poets: Six Stories and a Novella
- 2004: Sweet Land Stories – The New York Times Notable Book
- 2011: All the Time in the World: New And Selected Stories
- 2015: Cuentos Completos (Complete Short Stories) – with a "preface" by Eduardo Lago. (Spanish)

=== Nonfiction ===
- 1993: Jack London, Hemingway and the Constitution: Selected Essays, 1977–1992 (published in the UK as Poets and Presidents)
- 2004: Reporting the Universe. Harvard University Press - text of The William E. Massey Sr. Lecture in American Studies that Doctorow delivered in 2003
- 2006: Creationists: Selected Essays, 1993–2006
- 2015: Citizen Doctorow: Notes on Art & Politics (The Nation Essays 1978–2015) — appeared posthumously

=== Other ===
- 1978: Drinks Before Dinner: A Play
- 1982: American Anthem (photographic essay)
- 2003: Three Screenplays (Baltimore, MD: Johns Hopkins University Press) ISBN 9780801872013
- 2004: How Then Can He Mourn?, essay criticizing George W. Bush for the preemptive Iraq war.
- 2012: "Unexceptionalism: A Primer" (op-ed), The New York Times, April 28, 2012

=== Short fiction ===
Title	Publication	Collected in
"Liner Notes: The Songs of Billy Bathgate"	New American Review 2 (1968)	All the Time in the World
"The Foreign Legation"	Vanity Fair (April 1984)	Lives of the Poets
"Willi"	The Atlantic (May 1984)	Lives of the Poets
"The Leather Man"	The Paris Review 92 (Summer 1984)	Lives of the Poets
"The Writer in the Family"	Esquire (August 1984)	Lives of the Poets
"The Hunter"	Lives of the Poets (November 1984)	Lives of the Poets
"The Water Works"	Lives of the Poets (November 1984)	Lives of the Poets
"Lives of the Poets"	Lives of the Poets (November 1984)	Lives of the Poets
"Heist"	The New Yorker (April 21, 1997)	All the Time in the World
"A House on the Plains"	The New Yorker (June 18, 2001)	Sweet Land Stories
"Baby Wilson"	The New Yorker (March 25, 2002)	Sweet Land Stories
"Jolene: A Life"	The New Yorker (December 23/30, 2002)	Sweet Land Stories
"Walter John Harmon"	The New Yorker (May 12, 2003)	Sweet Land Stories
"Child, Dead, in the Rose Garden"	Virginia Quarterly Review (Spring 2004)	Sweet Land Stories
"Wakefield"	The New Yorker (January 14, 2008)	All the Time in the World
"All the Time in the World"	The Kenyon Review (Winter 2009)	All the Time in the World
"Edgemont Drive"	The New Yorker (April 26, 2010)	All the Time in the World
"Assimilation"	The New Yorker (November 22, 2010)	All the Time in the World
"The Drummer Boy on Independence Day"	The New Yorker (July 8–15, 2024)	-
