= Jolene: A Life =

- Short story by E. L. Doctorow
- Country: United States
- Language: English

Publication
- Published in: The New Yorker
- Publication date: December 23/30, 2002

"Jolene: A Life" is a short story by E. L. Doctorow originally appearing in The New Yorker (December 23/30, 2002), and first collected in Sweet Land Stories (2004) by Random House.

It was adapted into the 2008 film Jolene, directed by Dan Ireland and starring Jessica Chastain in her film debut.

== Plot ==
"Jolene: A Life" is presented from a third-person point-of-view. Jolene is the focal character.

Jolene, an orphan in the foster care system, marries the 20-year-old Mickey Collins to escape her foster father's sexual advances. The newlyweds move into a room in the home of Mickey's Uncle Phil and Aunt Kay. Phil, a handsome and successful businessman employs Mickey as a truck driver. Phil seduces Jolene and they engage in a torrid sexual affair. Mickey and Kay discover the tryst and a violent melee ensues: the cuckolded victims hold Jolene responsible: Mickey commits suicide. Jolene is placed in a mental institution for juveniles. There she begins to develop her talents in portraiture, making water colors of fellow inmates. Jolene enters briefly into a lesbian relationship with a night attendant, Cindy. Now age 17, Jolene escapes and flees to Phoenix, Arizona with $100. To avoid detection as a juvenile, Jolene adopts the clothing and attitude of an older woman.

Working at a Dairy Queen, Jolene is pursued by a young tattoo artist named Coco Leger. Jolene's co-worker warns her to avoid him. Colo trains Jolene in the art of tattooing, at which she excels. She moves in with him and they are soon married.

Jolene discovers that Coco is a drug dealer and a philanderer; he collects all the profits from the tattoo shop, though Jolene services most of the patrons. A strange woman holding an infant in her arms enters the store and identifies herself as Mrs. Leger. When Coco arrives, he ushers the woman to his car and departs. In his absence, Jolene, trashes the shop. She departs with a few personal effects, and calls the Phoenix police department to the premises, and leaves. Jolene feels more than ever bereft of her biological parents: her mother dead, her father in prison.

Jolene's next stop is Las Vegas, Nevada. There she is recruited as a stripper and taught to do pole dancing. The impresario of the establishment introduces Jolene to a sophisticated grey-haired gentleman, Mr. Sal Fontaine. The elderly Fontaine is a successful numbers maker. He showers Jolene with expensive gifts and takes her as his mistress; she lives the life of a penthouse princess. Jolene tries to convince herself she loves Sal, but he is cypher to her. Jolene is troubled that she has unconsciously assumed "that set of mouth and stony gaze of a Las Vegas bimbo."

Sol informs Jolene some men will be meeting him in the penthouse; he orders her to go down to the coffee shop. Downstairs, Jolene suspects the truth: shortly thereafter, Sol's corpse is wheeled out on a gurney, reportedly a victim of a heart attack. Rather than collect her jewels and cash in the apartment—risking being interrogated by the police concerning a gangland murder—Jolene flees with only the clothes she is wearing.

Two years later Jolene is in Tulsa, Oklahoma waitressing. While moonlighting for an upscale catering business, she is formally invited to dinner by a tall, handsome client, Brad G. Benton; Jolene is flattered. A successful stock broker, he confesses to her that as a born again Christian, interested only in post-matrimonial sex. Jolene is overwhelmed by his earnestness, and accepts a gift of a diamond ring. A week later they are married, though no members of Brad's prominent Tulsa relatives have attended, a snub at Jolene's plebeian origins. She continues to pursue her artistic interests; Brad neglects to take any notice of her paintings. Jolene finds herself utterly isolated in Tulsa society.

After Jolene gives birth to a boy, Brad begins to physically abuse her. Attending church services among wealthy parishioners, Jolene submits to the role of a battered wife. The abuse climaxes when Brad smashes her art studio and brutally assaults her; at the doctor's office she discovers that she has suffered facial fractures, broken ribs, throat contusions and a bruised kidney. She retreats to a woman's shelter. Jolene's lawyer informs her that her sordid personal history is such that any attempt to win alimony will fail; the Benton family is too powerful. Jolene's child is taken from her by the authorities.

Jolene escapes from Tulsa and moves to West Hollywood, California. She works for a graphic arts company. She lives in solitude in a studio apartment. She has ambitions to write a graphic novel entitled The Life of Jolene. At only 25 years old, she has hopes for a career in film. She has fantasies that she will return to Tulsa a famous movie star, and retrieve her son.

== Critical appraisal ==
New York Times literary critic Michiko Kakutani considers these tales less "full-fledged stories" than mere sketches for proposed film adaptions. Kakutani reports that "Jolene: A Life" "reads like a white-trash take on Darling (1965).

Literary critic Peter Wolfe in Prairie Schooner notes Doctorow's "economy and assurance" in engaging the reader with its sentence: "She married Mickey Holler when she was fifteen." Despite the perfidy and humiliations she has suffered by the time she is age nineteen, Jolene survives: "[S]he's working as an illustrator at story's end, practicing the same art that has survived twenty years of indifference and even anger from those closest to her."

Reviewer Sandy English at the World Socialist Web Site writes:

"Joline, a Life," gives us something authentic and necessary...There is some relief, but not much hope for the young woman in a society that does not take good care of the young. "Joline: a Life" raises feelings of anger and sympathy.

== Sources ==
- Doctorow, E. L.. 2004. Sweet Land Stories. Random House, New York. ISBN 978-1-4000-6204-1
- English, Sandy. 2006. Some insights into American life as it is: Doctorow's Sweet Land Stories. WSWS, May 9, 2006. https://www.wsws.org/en/articles/2006/05/doct-m09.html Accessed September 30, 2025.
- Wolfe, Peter. 2006. Sweet Land Stories by E. L. Doctorow Prairie Schooner, Vol. 80, No. 1 (Spring 2006), pp. 206-207 University of Nebraska Press https://www.jstor.org/stable/40638303 Accessed 30 September, 2025.
