= Welcome to Hard Times (film) =

1967 film by Burt Kennedy

- Theatrical release poster
- Directed by: Burt Kennedy
- Screenplay by: Burt Kennedy
- Based on: Welcome to Hard Times by E. L. Doctorow
- Produced by: David Karr; Max E. Youngstein
- Starring: Henry Fonda; Janice Rule; Keenan Wynn; Janis Paige; John Anderson; Warren Oates; Fay Spain; Edgar Buchanan; Aldo Ray
- Cinematography: Harry Stradling Jr.
- Edited by: Aaron Stell
- Music by: Harry Sukman
- Color process: Metrocolor
- Production companies: Youngstein and Karr Productions
- Distributed by: Metro-Goldwyn-Mayer
- Release date: May 1, 1967 (New York City)
- Running time: 103 minutes
- Country: United States
- Language: English

Welcome to Hard Times is a 1967 American Western film written and directed by Burt Kennedy and starring Henry Fonda as the leader of a dying town that is too weak to stand up to a brute terrorizing the few remaining residents. It is based upon the 1960 novel by E. L. Doctorow.

According to Kennedy, "It has something of a cult following—it's a dark, dreary kind of a thing." He added, Doctorow "came out in the press saying that it was the second-worst picture he'd ever seen. I was afraid to ask him what the first one was. I was afraid it was one of mine."

== Plot ==
A vicious stranger, the "Man from Bodie", terrorizes the small settlement of Hard Times. He kills the only men who stand up to him, town founder Mr. Fee and town undertaker Mr. Hanson, as well as raping and killing Fee's girlfriend Flo. Before he leaves, he burns down the handful of buildings.

Only a few people stay, among them Will Blue. Blue takes in Fee's young, orphaned son Jimmy and convinces his woman, Molly, to stay there with them. A few other people arrive. Zar and his four saloon girls settle in to serve the nearby miners. Isaac Maple comes looking for his long-gone storekeeper brother, so Blue persuades him to reopen the general store. A drifter, Leo Jenks, also lazes around town.

Blue tries hard to build a family and a prosperous community, but Molly despises him for not standing up against the Man from Bodie and is obsessed with revenge against him for what he did. They both expect the Man will return in the spring. Molly works on Jenks, a fine shot, and even infects Jimmy with her consuming hatred, getting him a shotgun.

The villain shows up and resumes his terrorizing ways. Molly persuades Jenks to go after him. Jenks kills Zar by mistake and is gunned down. Blue is wounded in the shoulder, but then the Man runs out of bullets, and Blue shoots him several times.

Blue carries the Man's body home to show Molly. When she gingerly approaches, the Man momentarily revives. Molly attempts to stab the villain, but he grabs her hand. Her panicked yell for help brings Jimmy running with his shotgun. Blue grabs the weapon as Jimmy fires, killing the Man and striking Molly in the stomach. Just before she dies, she asks Blue to hold her. Later, from her gravesite, Blue and Jimmy see the town come back to life.

== Cast ==
- Henry Fonda as Will Blue
- Janice Rule as Molly Riordan
- Keenan Wynn as Zar
- Janis Paige as Adah, one of Zar's girls
- John Anderson as Ezra and Isaac Maple
- Warren Oates as Leo Jenks
- Fay Spain as Jessie one of Zar's girls
- Edgar Buchanan as Brown, the territorial governor's representative
- Aldo Ray as Man from Bodie
- Denver Pyle as Alfie, the stagecoach driver
- Michael Shea as Jimmy Fee
- Arlene Golonka as Mae, one of Zar's girls
- Lon Chaney Jr. as Avery, the saloonkeeper
- Royal Dano as John Bear
- Alan Baxter as Jack Millay
- Paul Birch as Mr. Fee, Jimmy's father
- Dan Ferrone as Bert Albany, Blossom's man
- Paul Fix as Major Munn C.S.A.
- Elisha Cook Jr. as Hanson (undertaker)
- Kalen Liu as China aka Blossom
- Ann McCrea as Flo, Fee's woman

== Production ==
Welcome to Hard Times was filmed on location at the Conejo Ranch in Thousand Oaks, California, and the MGM backlot in Culver City, California.

== Reception ==
=== Initial reception ===
Bosley Crowther of The New York Times thought Aldo Ray's performance was "fascinating and hypnotizing": "I would guess, in all his times in Western movies, Mr. Fonda has never seen a more wild and implausible badman than this jughead whom Mr. Ray plays. Not only does he knock the tops off bottles instead of pulling out the corks when he wants to guzzle a couple of quarts of whisky (that's a standard badman ploy), but he ravishes bar girls, shoots his own horse and guns down Elisha Cook Jr. with even more cold-blooded arrogance than Jack Palance did in Shane."

Variety panned the film with contempt for Kennedy's "inept" direction and script. It dismissed Rule's performance as "unsatisfactory", comparing it to a "Method school version" of the iconic Western-movie star Maureen O'Hara. Though taking note of the star-studded supporting cast—noting Edgar Buchanan's performance as the "best" among them, and giving credit for "comic relief" to Wynn and the saloon girls—Variety said the collection of "many pro names" simply underscored a "lack of depth and perception" by the "script and direction."

The cinematography by Harry Stradling Jr. was highly regarded.

=== Modern reception ===
The movie continues to be critiqued by some reviewers as being awkward and unsettling, with an ending that is unsatisfying (even "nihilistic"). While noting no consensus exists among reviewers, Rotten Tomatoes audience scores it at 42%. However, one modern reviewer describes it as "better than average" for a Western.

Craig Butler in the All Movie Guide notes that the movie "tends to divide audiences" along the lines of whether or not they are expecting, and preferring, a conventional Western (virtue triumphs through justifiable violence), or are attracted to a very contradictory type of movie. For the latter, Butler contends the film offers much "to ponder and to study", but notes that the movie is a "downer" that arguably puts most of its effort into conveying a "message" rather than providing entertainment. Butler describes the film as a revisionist Western, typical of the 1960s, disassembling the classic Western, and reassembling it in ways that did not always follow the traditions of the genre.

Butler makes positive comments about the performances of Fonda, Ray, Wynn, Oates, Buchanan, Paige, and Pyle. Time Out concurs that the supporting cast is "immaculate" and notes Fonda's performance as "intriguing".

== See also ==
- List of American films of 1967
