= Wirt Williams =

American journalist

- Born: August 21, 1921; Goodman, Mississippi, U.S.
- Died: June 29, 1986 (aged 64); Hollywood, California, U.S.

Wirt Williams (August 21, 1921 – June 29, 1986) was an American novelist, journalist, and professor of English.

== Early life and education ==
Born on August 21, 1921, on the campus of the Goodman, Mississippi-based agricultural school headed by his father (which would later become Holmes Community College), Williams was raised in Cleveland, Mississippi where he was graduated from Cleveland High School (Cleveland, Mississippi). Williams took his undergraduate degree at Delta State University and in 1941, was awarded a master's degree in journalism from Louisiana State University.

== Military service ==
Williams joined the Navy in 1942, and was commissioned an ensign in the Naval Reserve. He was stationed on the destroyer the USS Decatur that patrolled the North Atlantic seeking out and destroying German submarines. Subsequently, he was transferred to the Pacific Theater of Operations, where he was the captain of a landing ship (LSM) preparing for the proposed Operation Downfall.. He attained the rank of lieutenant commander.

His first novel The Enemy (1951), was based on his combat experiences aboard the submarine destroyer.

== Journalism ==
After being demobilized, Williams became a reporter on the Shreveport Times and, subsequently, the New Orleans Item. For his reporting on the conditions inside a Louisiana insane asylum, he won a Heywood Broun Newspaper Guild Award. Later he became a columnist and editor for the Los Angeles Times.

== Teaching and writing ==
Williams left journalism and earned a PhD in English from the University of Iowa, subsequently becoming a professor of English at California State University, Los Angeles. He wrote six novels, one of which, 1959's Ada Dallas was made into the 1961 film Ada. His 1965 novel The Trojans, a roman a clef about the movie industry loosely based on the life of Marilyn Monroe and the debacle of the 1963 movie Cleopatra, became a best seller, selling over a million copies.

Both Ada Dallas and The Far Side, his 1972 roman à clef novel were loosely based on the early career of novelist James Jones. His other novels were Love in a Windy Space (1956) and A Passage of Hawks (1963).

Heavily influenced by Ernest Hemingway as a writer, Williams published The Tragic Art of Ernest Hemingway in 1982.

== Legacy ==
Williams was nominated three times for the Pulitzer Prize, twice for fiction and once for journalism. Critic Robert Kirsch called him "a major writer in 20th century American literature" and a "master novelist."

== Death ==
Shortly after retiring as a professor, Wirt Williams died of a stroke on June 29, 1986. He was 64 years old.

== Works ==
- The Enemy (1951)
- Love in a Windy Space (1956)
- Ada Dallas (1959)
- A Passage of Hawks (1963)
- The Trojans (1965)
- The Far Side (1972)
- The Tragic Art of Ernest Hemingway (1982)
