= The March (novel) =

2005 novel by E. L. Doctorow

- Cover of the first edition
- Author: E.L. Doctorow
- Language: English
- Genre: Historical fiction
- Publisher: Random House
- Publication date: 2005
- Publication place: United States
- Media type: Print (Hardcover and Softcover)
- Pages: 384 pp
- ISBN: 0-375-50671-3
- OCLC: 60596218
- Dewey Decimal: 813/.54 22
- LC Class: PS3554.O3 M37 2005

The March: A Novel is a 2005 historical fiction novel by E. L. Doctorow. Its title refers to Union General William Tecumseh Sherman's March to the Sea during the American Civil War. It won the PEN/Faulkner Award for Fiction (2006) and the National Book Critics Circle Award/Fiction (2005).

== Plot summary ==
The March is set in late 1864 and early 1865 near the conclusion of the American Civil War. Central to the novel is the character of General William Tecumseh Sherman as he marches his 60,000 troops through the heart of the South, from Atlanta to Savannah, carving a 96 km (60-mile)-wide scar of destruction in their wake. As a result of Sherman's order to live off the land, his soldiers sow chaos as they pillage homes, steal cattle, burn crops, and attract a nearly unmanageable population of freed slaves and refugees who have nowhere else to go. While the novel revolves around the decisions of General Sherman, the story has no specific main character. Instead, Doctorow retells Civil War history according to the individual lives of a large and diverse cast of characters—white and black, rich and poor, Union and Confederate—whose lives are caught up in the violence and trauma of the war.

The character of General Sherman is an unstable strategic genius who longs for a sense of romance in the war he wages and chafes under the implications of a post-war bureaucracy. Charismatic, yet often detached, Sherman is idolized by his men and the freed slaves who follow behind in hope of a better future. Pearl is the young and attractive daughter of a black enslaved woman, Nancy Wilkins, and her white master who is unsure about her future and the attention she is now receiving from the handsome Union soldiers. She must decide whether to follow the advice of other emancipated slaves or choose to seek the possibilities she hopes the conclusion of the war will bring. Colonel Wrede Sartorius is a cold yet brilliant field surgeon who is seemingly numb to the horrors of war due to his close and frequent proximity to the surgical hacksaw which he carries with him everywhere. Trained in Germany, Sartorius experiments with new techniques on his patients and is consumed with his work, leaving little time for regret, romance, or pain. Arly and Will are two Confederate soldiers who serve the roles of the Shakespearean fool, alternately offering comic relief and poignant wisdom. Their antics are wild and chaotic and include defecting to the Union, impersonation, and robbing a church in order to be able to pay for a trip to a brothel. Emily Thompson, a judge's daughter, is a displaced southern aristocrat from Milledgeville, Georgia, which was then the state capital. She becomes the surgical assistant and lover to the cold, passionless Colonel Sartorius.

The novel concludes when Lincoln is assassinated on 14 April 1865, shortly after Lee's surrender, exposing the cautious optimism of the freed slaves and beleaguered soldiers. The final scene describes the faint smell of gunpowder dissipating through a forest with the lonely image of the boot and shredded uniform of a fallen soldier lying in the dirt. While Doctorow's characters express guarded hope now that the conflict is over, the physical and psychological toll of the war has left its scars on the people and the land, and no one is quite sure what to do next.

== Critical reception ==
The March won the 2006 PEN/Faulkner fiction award, which Doctorow had previously won in 1990 for his novel Billy Bathgate; it also won the 2005 National Book Critics Award and was a finalist for the 2006 Pulitzer Prize and the 2005 National Book Award. It won the 2006 Michael Shaara Award for Excellence in Civil War Fiction.

== Adaptations ==
In early 2012, the Steppenwolf Theatre Company premiered an adaptation of The March for stage.

== See also ==
- Sherman's March to the Sea
