= List of Bronx High School of Science alumni =

The following is a list of notable people who attended the Bronx High School of Science in the Bronx, New York City.

== Academia ==
- Bruce Ackerman (1960), constitutional law scholar, Yale Law School
- Marshall Berman, professor, City College
- M. Donald Blaufox (1952), nuclear medicine physician and professor
- Harold Brown, former president, California Institute of Technology (Caltech)
- Charles Cogen, president, New York City's United Federation of Teachers and American Federation of Teachers
- Martin S. Fiebert (1956), author, psychologist, professor emeritus at California State University, Long Beach
- Jeffrey S. Flier (1964), dean of Harvard Medical School
- Murray Gerstenhaber (1944), mathematician and lawyer
- Herb Goldberg, author, psychologist, and male liberation movement activist
- Gene Grossman (1973), former chair, Department of Economics, Princeton University
- Martin Jay (1961), historian, University of California Berkeley
- Richard Kadison (1942), mathematician
- Beryl Levinger (1964), distinguished professor emerita at the Middlebury Institute of International Studies and former chair of the Development Practice and Policy Program
- Andrew Lo (1977), professor at the MIT Sloan School of Management, director of MIT's Laboratory for Financial Engineering
- Deborah Frank Lockhart (1965), American Mathematical Society fellow
- Daniel Lowenstein (1960), director of the Center for Liberal Arts and Institutions, UCLA and first chairman of California Fair Political Practices Commission
- Lynn Mahoney (1982), president, San Francisco State University
- Anthony Marx (1977), president and CEO of New York Public Library and former president, Amherst College
- Gary Saul Morson, literary critic, Lawrence B. Dumas Professor of the Arts and Humanities, Northwestern University
- Richard A. Muller, professor of physics, University of California, Berkeley
- George Ritzer (1958), sociologist
- Michael I. Sovern, former president, Columbia University
- Joan Straumanis (1953), first female president of Antioch College, her alma mater; philosopher and women's studies pioneer at Denison University; dean at Kenyon College, Rollins College, Lehigh University; also president at Metropolitan College of New York
- Gregory J. Vincent (1979), president, Hobart and William Smith Colleges
- Jack Russell Weinstein (1987), professor of philosophy and director of Institute for Philosophy in Public Life, University of North Dakota, and NPR radio host
- Barry Wellman (1959), author, sociologist, founder of International Network for Social Network Analysis, Royal Society of Canada fellow, and developer of the theory of "networked individualism"
- Judy Yee, professor of radiology, Albert Einstein College of Medicine

== Activism and government ==
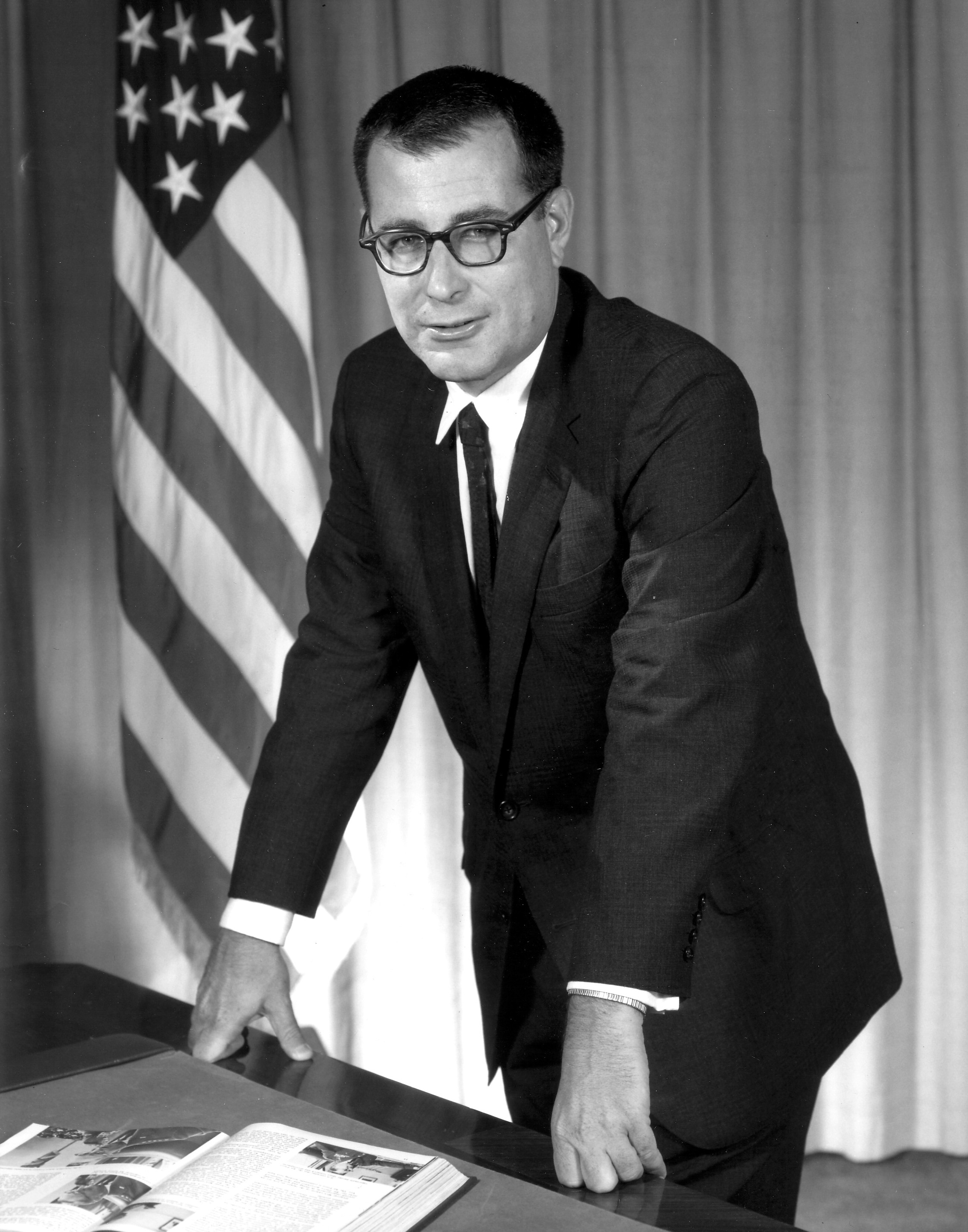
Harold Brown

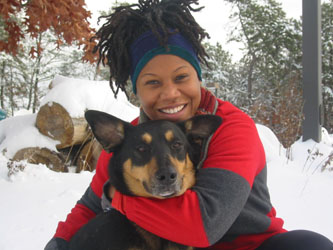
Majora Carter

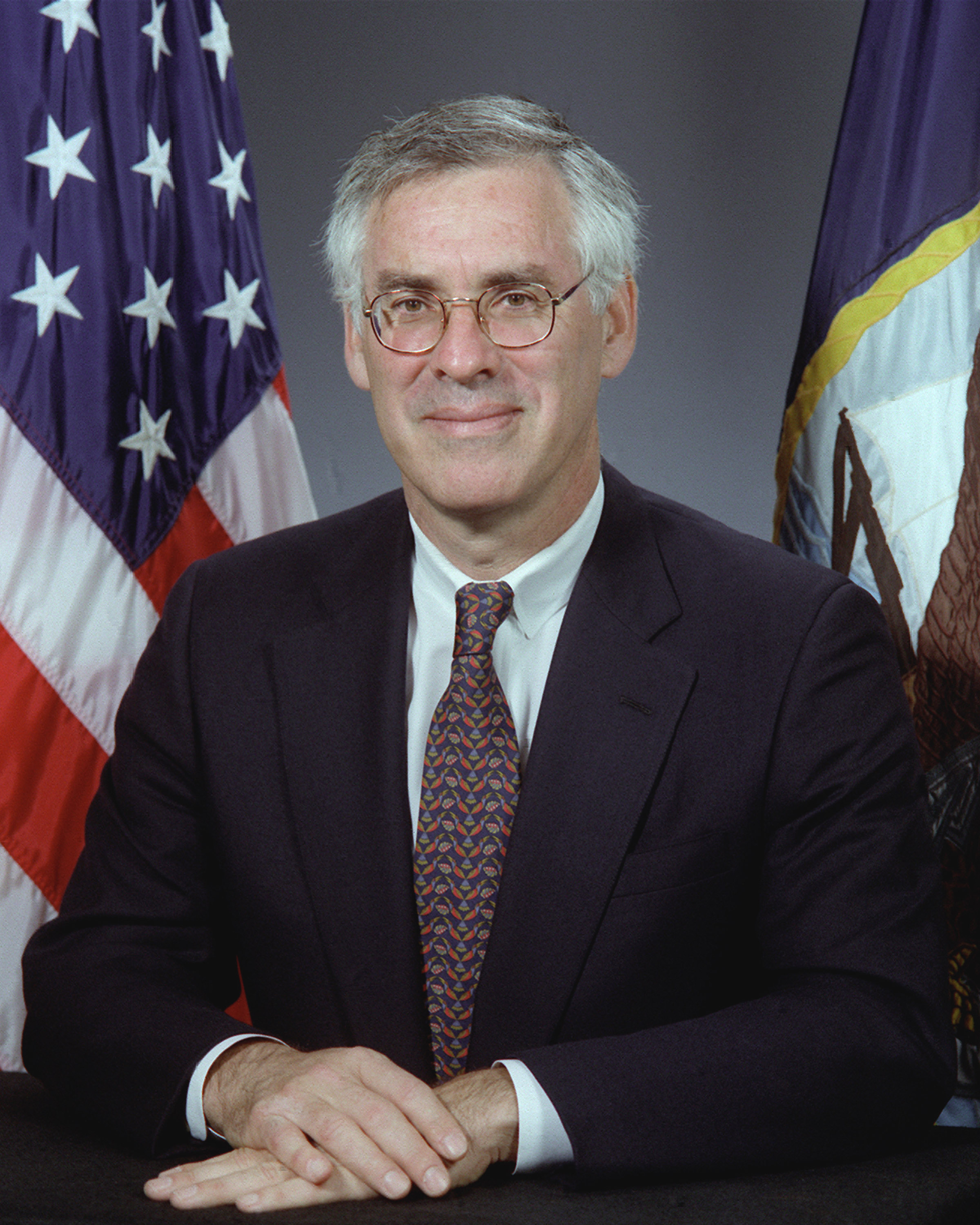
Richard Danzig

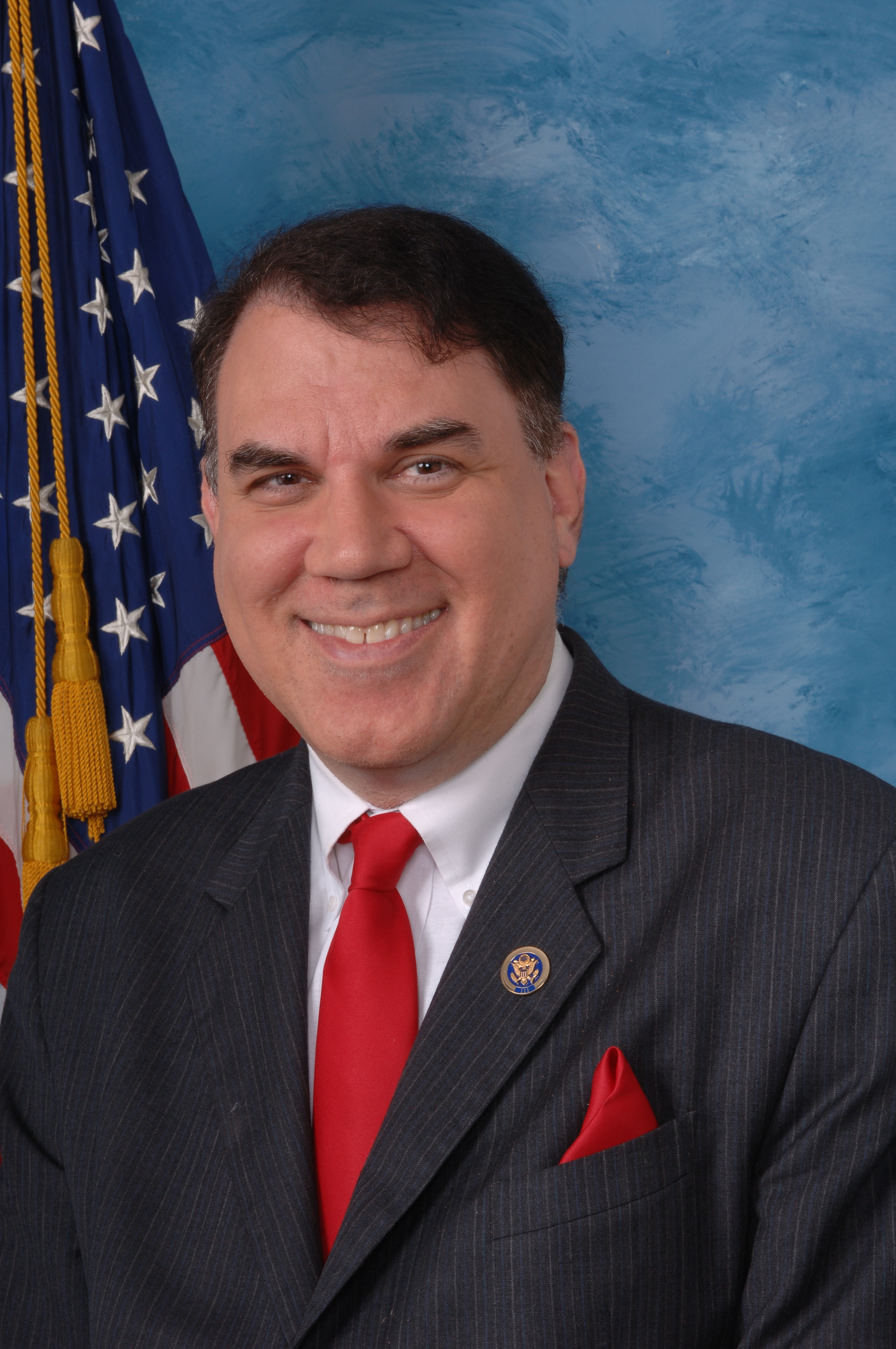
Alan Grayson

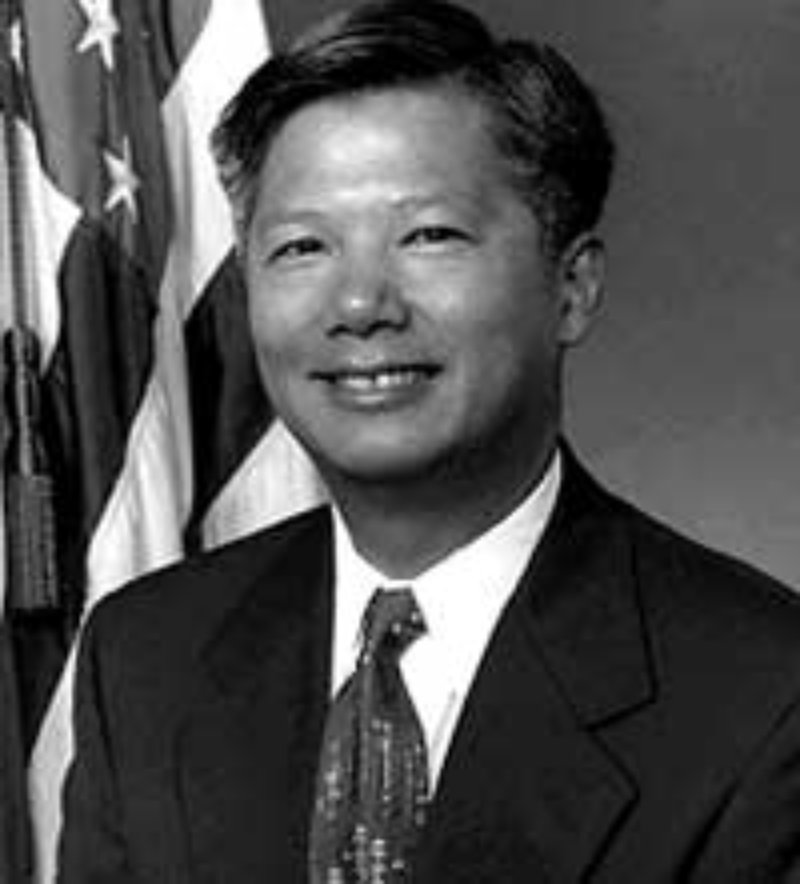
Bill Lann Lee

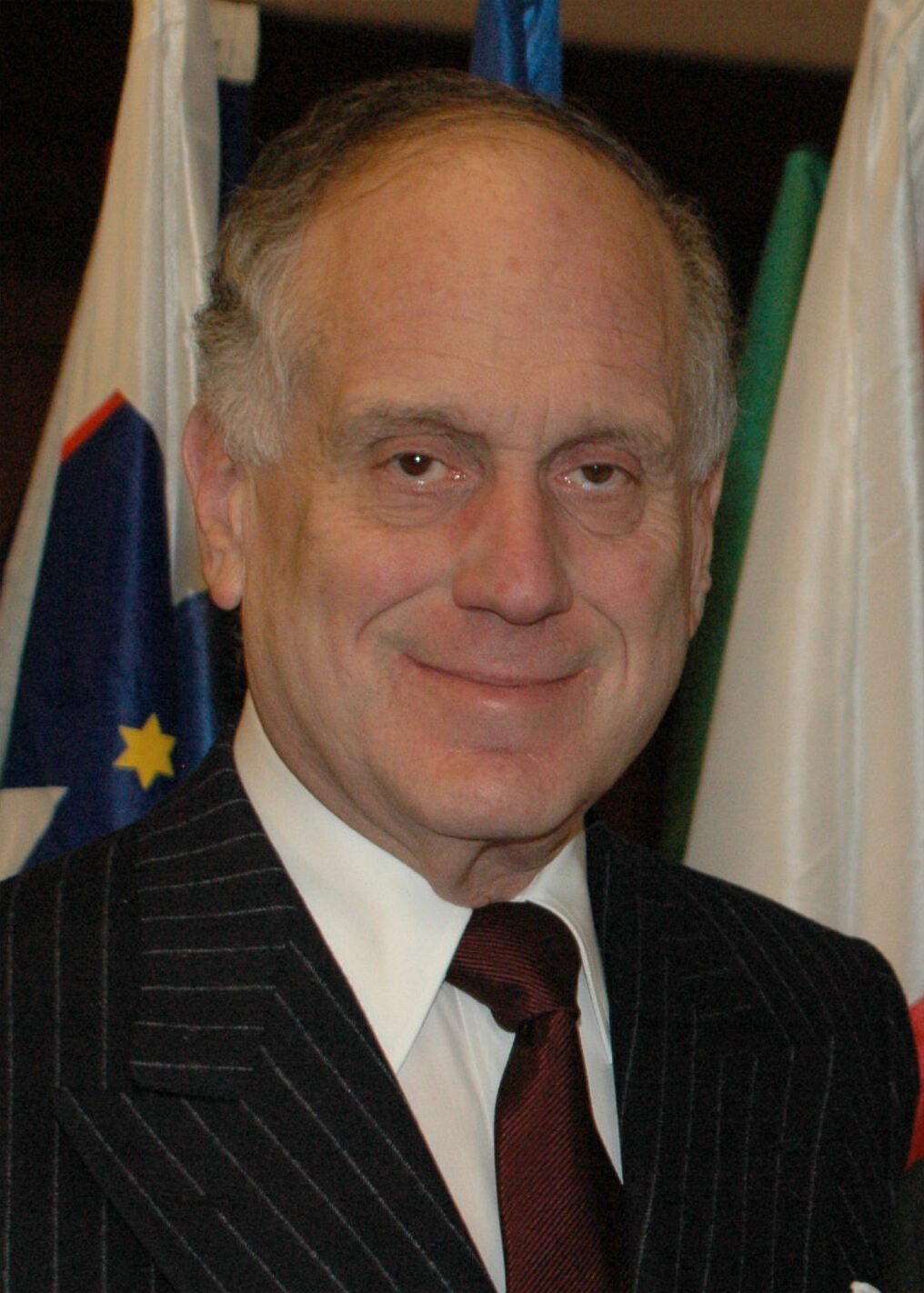
Ronald Lauder

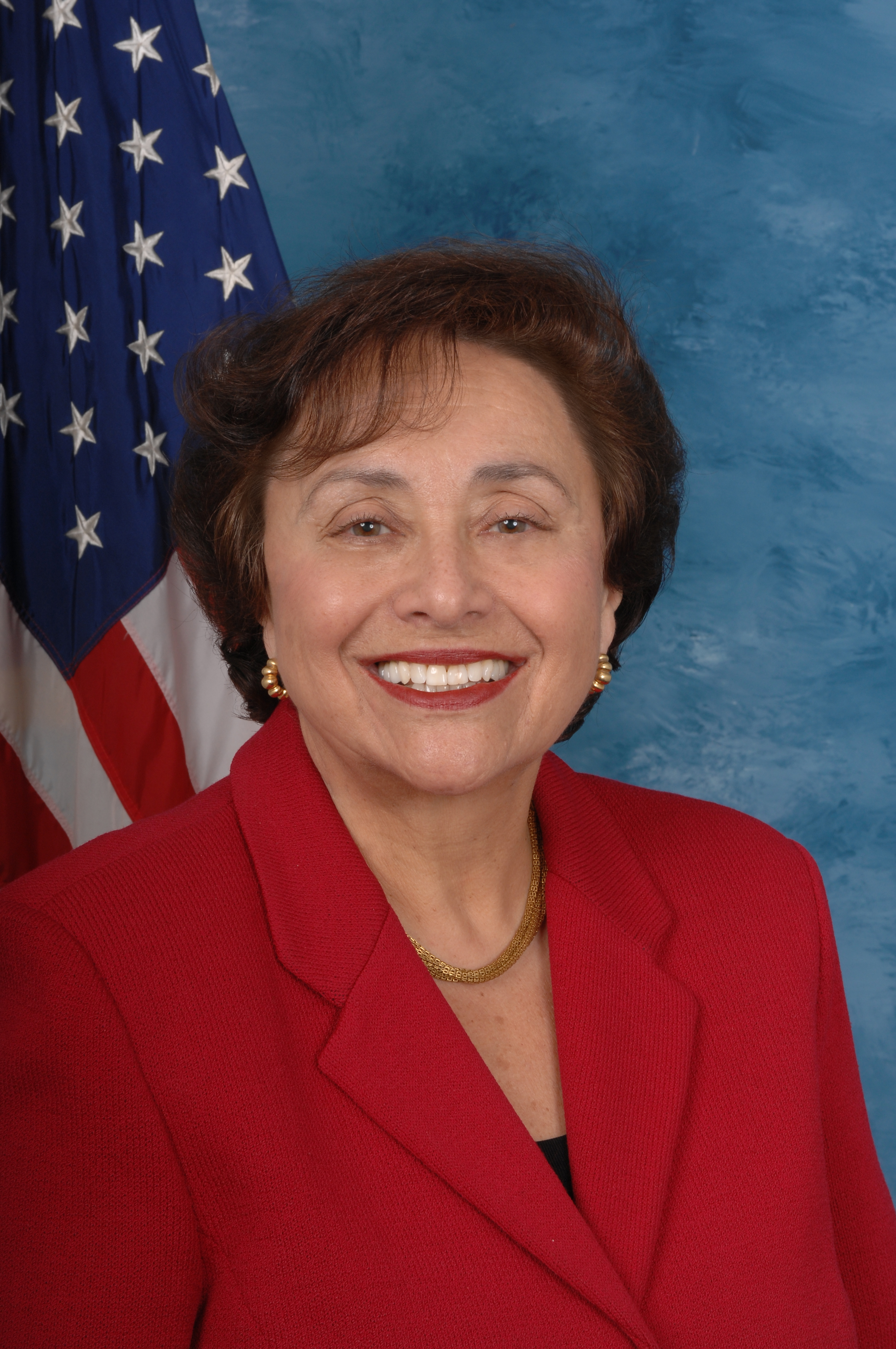
Nita Lowey

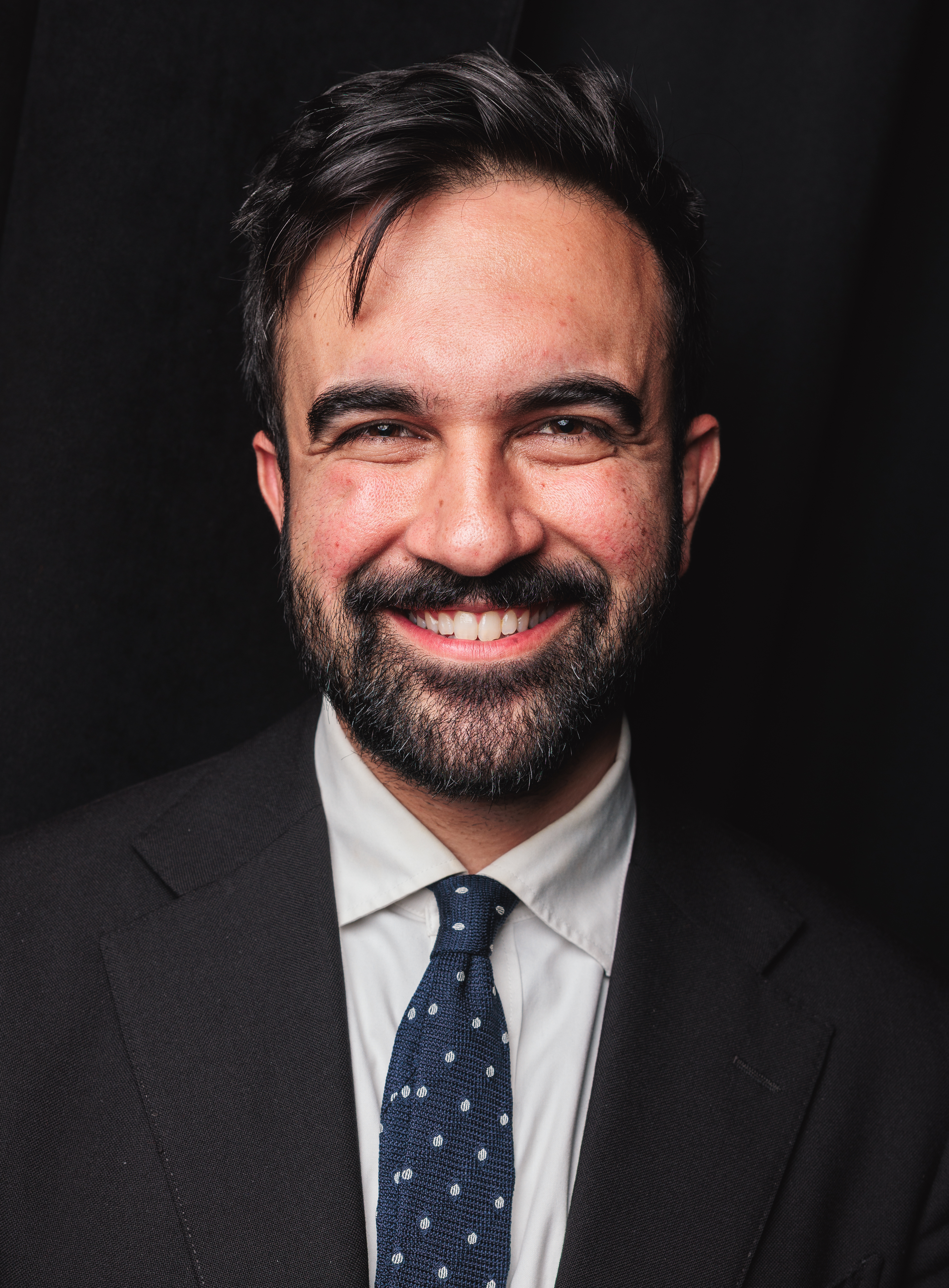
Zohran Mamdani

- Seth Andrew (1996), educator and founder, Democracy Prep Public Schools
- Jamaal Bailey (2000), New York State senator
- Harold Brown (1943), scientist and former United States Secretary of Defense (1977–81)
- Kwame Turé (Stokely Carmichael) (1960), leader of Student Nonviolent Coordinating Committee and Black Panther Party, notable figure in the Civil Rights Movement
- Majora Carter (1984), urban revitalization strategist, 2005 recipient of a MacArthur Fellowship "Genius Grant", 2010 Peabody Award recipient
- Edmond E. Chang (1988), federal judge, U.S. District Court for Northern Illinois
- Richard Danzig (1961), lawyer, former U.S. secretary of the Navy (1998–2001), and Center for a New American Security chairman
- Jeffrey Dinowitz (1971), New York State representative
- Eric Dinowitz (2003), member of the New York City Council from the 11th district
- Harriet Drummond (1969), Alaska state legislator
- Martin Garbus (1951), First Amendment lawyer
- Frank Genese (1976), deputy mayor, Village of Flower Hill NY
- Todd Gitlin (1959), writer, social critic, and former president of Students for a Democratic Society
- Harrison J. Goldin (1953), former New York City comptroller and former New York state senator
- Alan Grayson (1975) former U.S. congressman representing Florida's 8th congressional district
- Howard Gutman (1973), lawyer, actor, and former U.S. ambassador to Belgium
- Alvin Hellerstein (1950), U.S. federal district court judge
- Dora Irizarry (1972), U.S. federal district court judge, U.S. District Court for Eastern District of New York
- Benjamin Kallos (1999), New York City councilman
- G. Oliver Koppell (1958), former New York State attorney general, former New York State representative, former New York City councilman
- Jeffrey Korman (1963), former New York state senator
- Kenneth Kronberg (1964), printing company owner and LaRouche movement activist
- Leonard Lauder (1950), businessman, art collector, and heir to the Estee Lauder fortune
- Ronald Lauder (1961), businessman, art collector, heir to the Estee Lauder fortune, former U.S. ambassador to Austria; current president of the World Jewish Congress
- Bill Lann Lee (1967), former U.S. assistant attorney general in U.S. Justice Department Civil Rights Division and first Asian–American to head the division
- Harold O. Levy (1970), former New York City School chancellor (2000–02)
- John Liu (1985), former New York City councilman, former New York City comptroller, first Asian–American member of New York City Council, and first to hold citywide office
- Nita Lowey (1955), U.S. congresswoman representing New York's 17th congressional district
- Zohran Mamdani (2010), mayor of New York City (2026–present), member of the New York State Assembly (2021–2025)
- Edward Mermelstein (1987), former lawyer and businessman, current commissioner of the New York City Mayor's Office of International Affairs
- Ira Millstein (1943), antitrust lawyer, longest-practicing partner in big law
- Robert Price (1950), New York State commissioner of Investigation and former deputy mayor of New York City
- Donald L. Ritter, former U.S. congressman representing Pennsylvania's 15th congressional district
- Martha Shelley, lesbian activist, feminist, writer, and poet
- Madeline Singas, associate judge, New York Court of Appeals
- Toby Ann Stavisky (1956), member of the New York State Senate
- Terence Tolbert (1982), political operative and consultant for various New York State politicians; was involved in Barack Obama's presidential campaign

== Arts ==
=== Fine arts ===
- Elliott Landy (1959), photographer noted for his work with rock musicians, especially for his work at the Woodstock Festival
- Daniel Libeskind (1965), architect whose designs include Freedom Tower, Jewish Museum Berlin, Felix Nussbaum Haus, and the Royal Ontario Museum
- Marilyn Nance (1971), photographer of spirituality and the African diaspora

=== Performing arts ===
- Zack Alford (1983), professional drummer (David Bowie, Bruce Springsteen, and The B-52's)
- Emanuel Azenberg (1951), multiple Tony and Drama Desk Award-winning producer, noted for his long professional relationship with Neil Simon
- James Bethea (1982), television producer and executive
- Mark Boal (1991), Academy Award-winning screenwriter, The Hurt Locker and Zero Dark Thirty
- Jessie Cannizzaro (2008), actress, singer, and comedy writer
- Dominic Chianese (1948), singer and actor, The Godfather Part II, Dog Day Afternoon and Junior Soprano on The Sopranos
- Jon Cryer (1983), two-time Primetime Emmy Award-winning actor (Pretty in Pink, Hot Shots!, Two and a Half Men)
- Bobby Darin (as Walden Robert Cassotto) (1953), Oscar-nominated actor, best known for his work as a songwriter and recording artist ("Mack the Knife", "Beyond the Sea")
- Jon Favreau (1984), screenwriter and actor Rudy and Swingers and director, Elf and Iron Man
- Jonah Falcon (1988), actor and talk show personality
- Michael Hirsh (c. 1966), head of the Cookie Jar group (animation); founder of Nelvana animation
- Sondra James, actress
- Qurrat Ann Kadwani, television actress, playwright and film producer
- Scott Kempner (1971), rock musician and songwriter (The Dictators, The Del-Lords, The Brandos, Little Kings)
- Don Kirshner, music producer and songwriter, best known for his work with The Monkees and for his television show Don Kirshner's Rock Concert
- Kenny Kosek (1966), fiddler
- Adam Lamberg, actor, best known for his role as Gordo on the television series Lizzie McGuire
- James Kyson Lee (1993), actor, best known for his role as Ando Masahashi on the television series Heroes
- Reggie Lucas, musician, songwriter, and record producer best known for producing the majority of Madonna's 1983 self-titled debut album
- Dash Mihok (c. 1988), actor, director, best known for co-starring since 2013 as Brendan "Bunchy" Donovan in the Showtime series Ray Donovan
- Tom Paley (1945), banjo and fiddle player, best known for his association with old-time music; co–founded the New Lost City Ramblers
- Dawn Porter (1984), documentary filmmaker and director
- Paul Provenza (1975), actor and comedian
- Christopher "Kid" Reid (1982), rap musician, comedian, and actor, best known for being one half of the group Kid 'n Play
- Daphne Maxwell Reid (1966), actress (The Fresh Prince of Bel-Air, Frank's Place), producer, and former model; first African–American homecoming queen at Northwestern University; first African–American to appear on the cover of Glamour
- David Ren (c. 2003), writer, and director
- Esther Scott (1971), film and television actress
- Maggie Siff (1992), actress (Mad Men, Sons of Anarchy, "Billions")
- Mel Simon (c. 1943), businessman and film producer
- Karina Smirnoff (c. 1996), professional ballroom Latin dancer, who was featured on seven seasons of Dancing With the Stars
- Worley Thorne, TV screenwriter, script consultant and adjunct assistant professor of English
- Eliot Wald (1962), TV and film writer (Saturday Night Live, Camp Nowhere)
- Boaz Yakin (1983), screenwriter and director

== Authors and journalists ==
=== Pulitzer Prize winners ===
- Spencer Ackerman (1998), senior national security correspondent for The Daily Beast; part of a team of editors and reporters awarded the 2014 award for public service journalism, for reporting on Edward Snowden and the National Security Agency's warrantless surveillance programs
- Joseph Lelyveld (1954), journalist and author; executive editor at The New York Times (1994–2001); won the 1986 award for General Nonfiction (Move Your Shadow: South Africa, Black and White)
- Richard Mauer (1966), journalist; reporter at Anchorage Daily News; he and his team won the 1989 Pulitzer Prize for Public Service
- William Safire (1947), author and speechwriter; won the 1978 award for Commentary
- Robert Samuels (2002), author and staff writer at the New Yorker, won the 2023 Pulitzer Prize for General Nonfiction (His Name Is George Floyd)
- William Sherman (1963), won the 1973 Pulitzer Prize for Investigative Specialized Reporting for investigative reporting that exposed abuse of the New York Medicaid program
- Buddy Stein (1959), editor and publisher of The Riverdale Press; won the 1998 Pulitzer Prize for Editorial Writing for writing on politics and other issues affecting New York City residents
- William Taubman (1958), professor of political science at Amherst College; won the 2004 award for Biography or Autobiography for Khrushchev: The Man and His Era
- Gene Weingarten (1968), reporter and columnist for The Washington Post; won the 2008 and 2010 awards for Feature Writing

=== Other authors and journalists ===
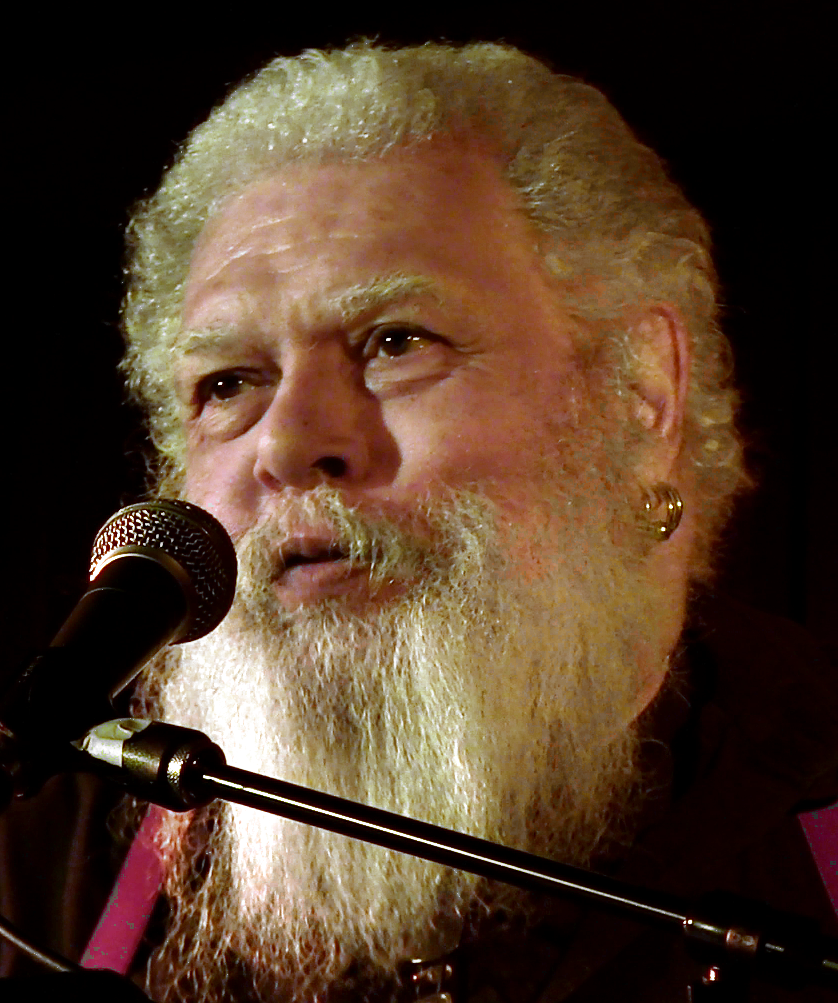
Samuel R. Delany

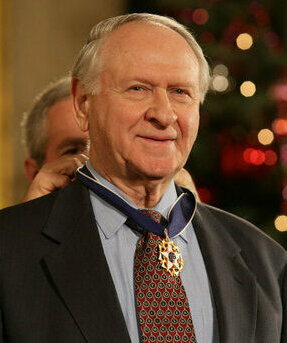
William Safire

- Judith Baumel (1973), poet; 1987 recipient of the Walt Whitman Award
- Peter S. Beagle (1955), author, singer, and guitarist, best known for The Last Unicorn
- Jennifer Belle, writer
- Joseph Berger (1962), New York Times reporter, author of memoir Displaced Persons: Growing Up American After the Holocaust
- Charles Bernstein, poet, essayist, editor, and literary scholar
- Harold Bloom (1947), influential literary critic, MacArthur Foundation Fellow, and professor of English at Yale University
- Mark Boal (1991), journalist and screenwriter; won two Oscars as screenwriter and producer of The Hurt Locker
- Samuel R. Delany (1960), science fiction author (Babel-17, The Einstein Intersection, "Time Considered as a Helix of Semi-Precious Stones"); recipient of four Nebula Awards and two Hugo Awards
- E. L. Doctorow (1948), author (The Book of Daniel, Ragtime, Loon Lake, Billy Bathgate, and The March); received the National Humanities Medal in 1998
- Danny Fingeroth (1971), comic book writer and editor, known for his work on Spider-Man
- John T. Georgopoulos (1982), fantasy sports journalist, writer and broadcast radio host
- Gerald Jay Goldberg, professor emeritus at the University of California, Los Angeles; novelist and critic
- Jeff Greenfield (1960), television journalist and political analyst for CBS News; author (The People's Choice: A Novel)
- Pablo Guzmán (as Paul Guzman) (1968), television journalist for WCBS-2 in New York; formerly a spokesman for the Young Lords
- Clyde Haberman (1962), columnist for the New York Times
- Marilyn Hacker (1959), poet, critic, translator, and recipient of the National Book Award
- Ed Kosner (1953), editor of Newsweek, New York Magazine, Esquire, and New York Daily News
- Min Jin Lee (1986), novelist, Free Food for Millionaires (2007) and Pachinko (2017)
- Lars-Erik Nelson (1959), correspondent and columnist for the New York Daily News, Newsweek, and Newsday
- Otto Penzler (1959), editor, author, and collector of espionage and thriller books; received an Edgar Award for Encyclopedia of Mystery & Detection
- Martin Peretz (1955), former owner and editor-in-chief of The New Republic magazine
- Kevin Phillips (1957), author and political analyst
- Richard Price (1967), author (Bloodbrothers, Clockers, Freedomland, Lush Life); Oscar–nominated screenwriter (The Color of Money)
- James Sanders (1972), architect, author, filmmaker, Guggenheim Fellow and Emmy Award-winning screenwriter
- April Smith (1967), author of novels including Be the One, and Good Morning, Killer, and TV scriptwriter for Lou Grant, Chicago Hope, and Cagney & Lacey
- Dava Sobel (1964), author, best known for her popular expositions in the sciences (Longitude, Galileo's Daughter)
- Norman Spinrad (1957), science fiction author (The Solarians, Bug Jack Barron, The Iron Dream); screenwriter ("The Doomsday Machine" - Star Trek)
- Gary Weiss (1971), journalist and author
- Dave Winer (1972), computer scientist and blogger

== Business, finance, and economics ==
=== Nobel Prize winners ===
- Claudia Goldin (1963), economic historian and labor economist, 2023 Nobel Memorial Prize in Economic Sciences recipient

=== Other business, finance, and economics alumni ===
- Rose Marie Bravo (1969), vice chairman, Burberry, former president of Saks Fifth Avenue
- Millard Drexler (1962), CEO, J.Crew, former CEO of Gap
- Jerald G. Fishman (1962), CEO, Analog Devices
- Gene Freidman (1988), New York City attorney
- Gedale B. Horowitz, partner, Salomon Brothers, former chairman of the Municipal Securities Rulemaking Board
- David Karp, founder, Tumblr
- Ray King, entrepreneur
- Leonard Lauder (1950), former president and current chairman, Estée Lauder Companies
- Phil Libin (1989), CEO, EverNote
- Lisa Su (1986), CEO and president of Advanced Micro Devices

== Science ==
=== Nobel Prize winners ===
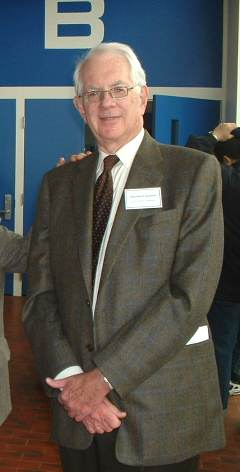
Sheldon Glashow

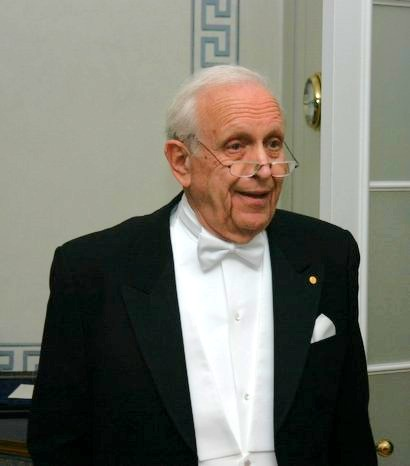
Roy J. Glauber

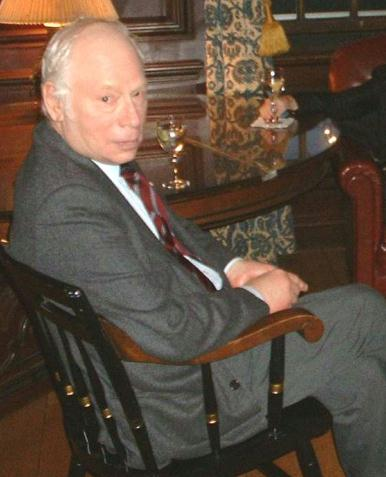
Steven Weinberg

The Bronx High School of Science counts nine Nobel Prize recipients as graduates. Seven of them received their prize in the field of physics. Robert J. Lefkowitz was awarded the 2012 Nobel Prize in Chemistry. The ninth Bronx Science Nobel went to Claudia Goldin, who won the Nobel Prize in Economics and is also the school's first female alumna Nobelist.

- Leon N. Cooper (1947), co–developer of BCS theory; namesake of Cooper pairs
- Sheldon Glashow (1950), physicist who proposed the modern electroweak theory (shared the 1979 prize with Weinberg)
- Roy J. Glauber (1941), physicist who made contributions to the quantum theory of optical coherence
- Claudia Goldin (1963), economist; won the Nobel Prize in Economics in 2023 for her research in participation and gender pay gaps in the work force
- Russell A. Hulse (1966), astrophysicist who co–discovered the first binary pulsar, providing significant evidence in support of the theory of general relativity
- Robert J. Lefkowitz (1959), biochemist known for his work with G protein-coupled receptors
- Hugh David Politzer (1966), physicist who co–discovered asymptotic freedom in quantum chromodynamics
- Melvin Schwartz (1949), physicist who co–developed the neutrino beam method demonstrating of the doublet structure of the lepton through the discovery of the muon neutrino
- Steven Weinberg (1950), physicist who proposed the modern electroweak theory

=== Other science and engineering alumni ===
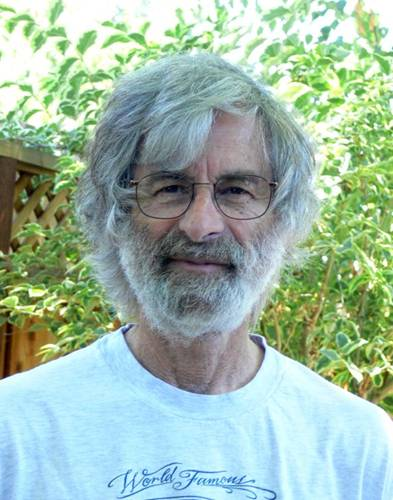
Leslie Lamport

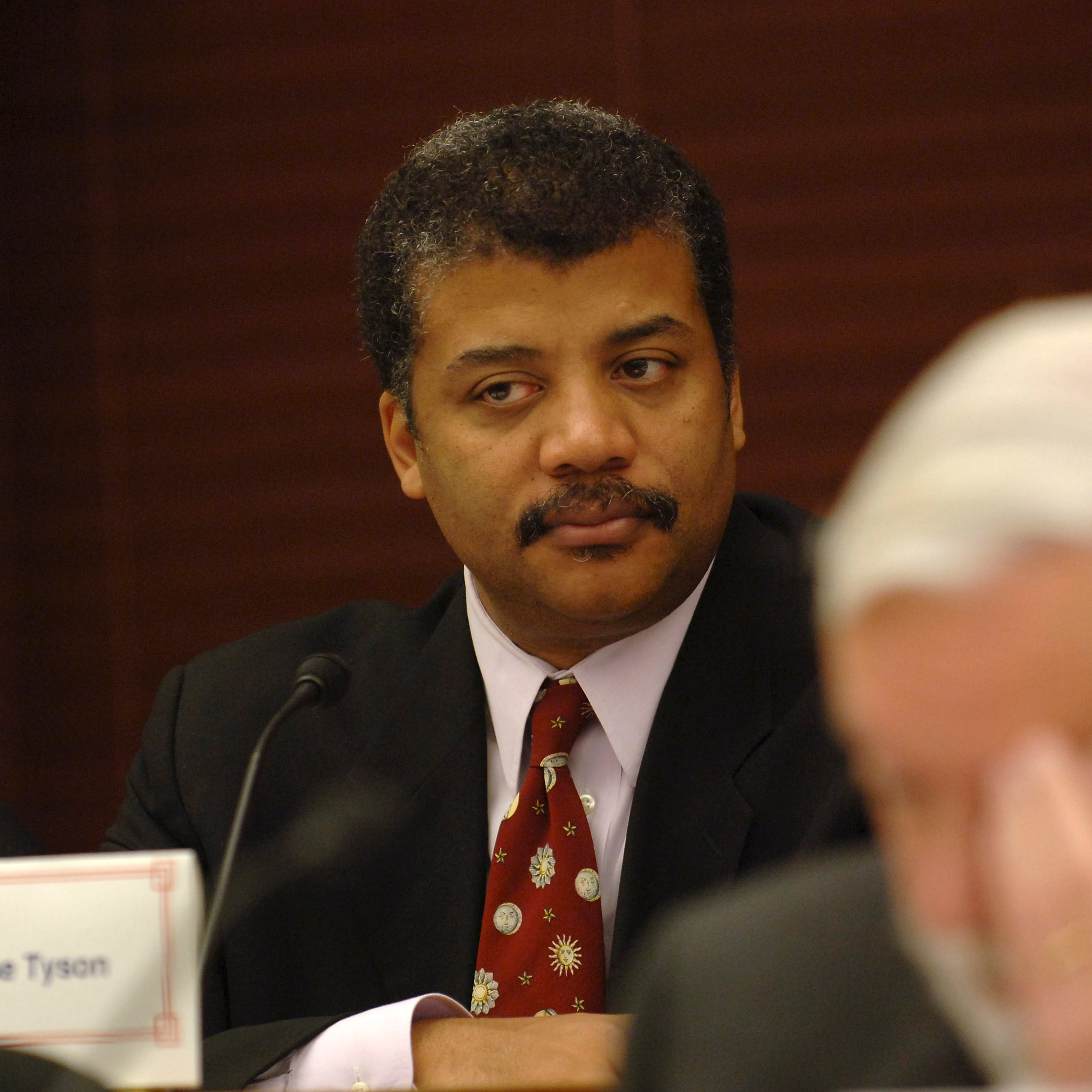
Neil deGrasse Tyson

- David Adler (1952), physicist
- Bruce Ames (1946), biologist, inventor of the Ames Test, winner of the National Medal of Science
- Naomi Amir, pediatric neurologist, established first pediatric neurology clinic in Israel
- Allen J. Bard, chemist, Priestley Medal recipient, pioneer of modern electrochemistry
- Jill Bargonetti (1980), biologist; noted for her work on the function of the oncogene p53
- Hans Baruch, physiologist and inventor
- Ira Black, neuroscientist and stem cell researcher, first director of the Stem Cell Institute of New Jersey
- Gregory Chaitin (1964), mathematician, computer scientist, and author; one of the founders of algorithmic information theory; namesake of Chaitin's constant
- Rahul Desikan (1995), neuroscientist and neuroradiologist; known for using "big data" acquired through ongoing global collaborations, he innovated a variety of cross disciplinary methods to identify novel risk factors for brain diseases
- Rana Fine, physical oceanographer, worked on ocean circulation and ventilation
- Andrew Fraknoi (1966), astronomer
- David J. Glass (1977), skeletal muscle biologist; discovered mechanisms controlling muscle hypertrophy and atrophy; elected to the National Academy of Sciences
- Michael H. Hart, astrophysicist, author of three books on history
- Martin Hellman (1962), electrical engineer and cryptologist who was instrumental in the development of public-key cryptography; 2015 recipient of the ACM Turing Award
- Leonard Kleinrock (1951), electrical engineer and computer scientist; oversaw the first ARPANET connection to the first node at UCLA; supervised sending the first message over what would become the internet
- Andrew R. Koenig (1968), computer scientist, inventor, and author, retired from Bell Labs
- Leslie Lamport (1957), computer scientist noted for fundamental contributions to theory of computing, including distributed systems and the development of LaTeX; 2013 recipient of the ACM Turing Award; namesake of the Lamport signature and Lamport's scheme
- Norman Levitt (1960), author and mathematics professor at Rutgers University; a figure in the fight against anti-intellectualism; his book Higher Superstition: The Academic Left and Its Quarrels with Science inspired the Sokal Affair
- Richard Lindzen, former Alfred P. Sloan Professor of Meteorology at MIT and critic of climate change extremism
- Barry Mazur, professor of mathematics and Gerhard Gade University Professor at Harvard University; recipient of the National Medal of Science and a number of prestigious mathematical prizes; member of the National Academy of Sciences
- Marvin Minsky (1945), cognitive scientist, computer scientist and inventor; pioneer in artificial intelligence; co-founder of the MIT Computer Science and Artificial Intelligence Laboratory; wrote Society of Mind and The Emotion Machine; patented the confocal microscope; recipient of the Turing Award
- Robert Moog (1952), electrical engineer; pioneer in the development of electronic music, notably for the invention of the Moog synthesizers, still produced by his namesake company
- Jay Pasachoff (1959), astronomy professor at Williams College; textbook writer; expert in astronomy education; director of the Hopkins Observatory; Asteroid 5100 Pasachoff is named in his honor
- Stanley Plotkin (1948), medical doctor, author, and co-creator of vaccines for several diseases including rubella, rabies, rotavirus, and cytomegalovirus
- Stuart Alan Rice, theoretical chemist and physical chemist
- Frank Rosenblatt (1946), computer pioneer; noted for designing Perceptron, one of the first artificial feedforward neural networks; namesake of the Frank Rosenblatt Award given by the Institute of Electrical and Electronics Engineers
- Jun John Sakurai (1951), particle physicist and author, noted for his work on vector mesons; namesake of the Sakurai Prize awarded annually by the American Physical Society
- Myriam Sarachik (1950), solid-state physicist; former president of the American Physical Society
- Edl Schamiloglu, distinguished professor at the Department of Electrical and Computer Engineering of the University of New Mexico
- Ben Shneiderman (1964), developer of computer visualization and human-computer interaction
- Lawrence B. Slobodkin, pioneer in the field of modern ecology
- Lisa Su (1986), electrical engineer, CEO and president of Advanced Micro Devices
- Leonard Susskind, widely regarded as one of the "fathers" of string theory
- Larry Tesler (1961), helped develop modern graphical user interface, invented the cut, copy, and paste commands
- Joseph F. Traub, computer scientist
- Neil deGrasse Tyson (1976), astrophysicist and current director of the Hayden Planetarium, American Museum of Natural History; known for his work on educational television, such as NOVA ScienceNOW and Cosmos: A Spacetime Odyssey; namesake of Asteroid 13123 Tyson
- Robert Williamson, molecular biologist and professor of medical genetics 1995–2005 at the Faculty of Medicine, Dentistry and Health Sciences, University of Melbourne
- Cynthia Wolberger (1979), professor of biophysics at the Johns Hopkins University School of Medicine; member of National Academy of Sciences and National Academy of Medicine
- George Yancopoulos (1976), medical researcher in molecular immunology; member of the National Academy of Sciences; founder and chief scientific officer of Regeneron Pharmaceuticals
- Norton Zinder (1945), biologist in the field of molecular biology; known for his discovery of genetic transduction; recipient of the NAS Award in Molecular Biology from the National Academy of Sciences in 1966; became a member of the National Academy of Sciences in 1969; led a lab at Rockefeller University until shortly before his death

== Sports ==
- Arthur Bisguier, chess grandmaster; 1954 U.S. Chess Champion; won three U.S. Open chess tournaments; played for the U.S. team in five Chess Olympiads
- Robert Ford (1997), radio broadcaster, Houston Astros, one of two full-time African-American play-by-play broadcasters in Major League Baseball
- Michael Kay (1978), New York Yankees sportscaster and current host of The Michael Kay Show
- Jeanette Lee, professional pool player known by nickname "The Black Widow"
- Ira Rubin (1946), contract bridge player known as "The Beast" for his aggressive playing style and for inventing three famous bidding systems
- Mike Sherlock (1966) played rugby for the Eagles, the US national rugby team from 1977 to 1981, and for the Eastern US rugby team from 1976 to 1982. He captained the Eastern US team against both the national teams of South Africa (1981) and England (1982).
- Joel Sherman (1979), Scrabble champion (1997, World Champion; 2002 US Champion)
- Herb Stempel, former contestant on the television game show Twenty One, known for his contest against Charles Van Doren, and for his role in exposing the subsequent quiz show scandals
- Benjamin (Benji) Ungar, fencer
- Wolf Wigo (1991), 3-time Olympic water polo player who was captain of the US National Water Polo Team
