= Taffel (surname) =

Taffel is a surname. Notable people with the surname include:

- Alexander Taffel (died 1997), American school principal
- Bess Taffel (1913–2000), American screenwriter
- Frank Taffel (1877–1947), American journalist
