= Judy Yee =

American radiologist

- Born: Manhattan, New York, USA

Academic background
- Education: BA, Biology, 1983, Barnard College; MD, 1987, Albert Einstein College of Medicine

Judy Yee is an American radiologist. She is the University Chair of Radiology at Montefiore and professor of radiology at Albert Einstein College of Medicine.

== Early life and education ==
Yee was born in Manhattan, New York along with four siblings. She attended the Bronx High School of Science and Barnard College where she majored in biology before earning her medical degree from Albert Einstein College of Medicine. Following this, she completed an internship at Mount Sinai Hospital in Manhattan and her radiology residency at Jacobi Medical Center.

== Career ==
Upon completing her medical residency, Yee completed a fellowship in abdominal imaging at the University of California, San Francisco (UCSF). She received the Howard L. Steinbach Award for Outstanding Fellow before joining the faculty at the UCSF in 1993. As an assistant professor of radiology and Chief of CT and gastrointestinal radiology at the San Francisco VA Medical Center (SFVAMC), Yee studied colorectal cancer screening and early detection. In 2001, she led a landmark study which found that Computed Tomographic (CT) colonography (virtual colonoscopies) was just as effective at detecting clinically significant colorectal polyps for colon cancer screening compared to standard invasive colonoscopy. Her research team came to this conclusion by comparing the virtual technique to the standard colonoscopy. In recognition of her efforts, she received the 2007 Visiting Professorship Award from the Society of Gastrointestinal Radiologists (SGR) for achievements in Radiologic research and education and became a member of the European Society of Gastrointestinal and Abdominal Radiology. Yee continued to conduct research on this subject and in 2008 published another study as site principal investigator of a large multi-center trial which confirmed her earlier work that CT colonography was a viable alternative to coloscopy for colon cancer screening. Yee was the site principal investigator of another large-scale study evaluating 605 patients to determine whether CTCs performed without laxatives was as accurate as conventional colonoscopy. As an expert in the field, Yee was the editor and main author of the textbook Virtual Colonoscopy and a patent on Enhanced Virtual Colonoscopy.

During her time as the chief of radiology at the SFVAMC and Vice Chair of radiology at UCSF, she also served as Vice Chair of the Board of the Northern California Institute for Research and Education (NCIRE). She has also served on the editorial boards of all major radiology journals including Radiology, RadioGraphics, Abdominal Radiology, American Journal of Roentgenology, and the Journal of Computer Assisted Tomography. Her achievements have been recognized nationally and in 2015 she was appointed President of the Society of Abdominal Radiology. In her final year at SFVAMC, Yee used 3D technology to create virtual holography CTC in an effort to advance non-invasive screening for colon cancer.

In 2017, Yee was appointed University Chair of Radiology at Montefiore Health System and professor of radiology at Albert Einstein College of Medicine. She was later recognized by the European Society of Gastrointestinal and Abdominal Radiology as an honorary fellow, becoming the first woman to earn this title in the 30-year history of the society.
