= Richard Mauer =

American investigative journalist (1949–2026)

- Mauer in 2010
- Born: Richard David Mauer; May 29, 1949; New York City, U.S.
- Died: February 23, 2026 (aged 76); Seattle, Washington, U.S.
- Education: University of Colorado Boulder
- Occupation: Investigative journalist
- Spouse: Barb Jacobs

Richard David Mauer (May 29, 1949 – February 23, 2026) was an American investigative journalist.

== Early life and career ==
Mauer was born in The Bronx, New York, the son of Arnold Mauer, a United Cerebral Palsy comptroller, and Rosalyn Bederson, a science teacher. He attended and graduated from the Bronx High School of Science. After graduating, he attended the University of Colorado Boulder, but dropped out to work as a volunteer for AmeriCorps VISTA in Idaho, which after a year, he returned to attend Colorado Boulder, majoring in journalism and earning his bachelor's degree in 1973.

Later in his career, Mauer wrote for newspapers such as Idaho Statesman, The Miami News and The Daily Sentinel. In 1983, he moved to Alaska, and was hired by the Anchorage Daily News. During his journalism career, in 1984, he interviewed businessman Bill Allen and exposed that VECO Corporation funneled money to support Alaskan Republican candidates who were supporters of big oil. In 1988, he covered Operation Breakthrough, a mission to free three gray whales from pack ice in the Beaufort Sea near Point Barrow. In 1989, he and his team of the Anchorage Daily News won the Pulitzer Prize for public service, and in the same year, he covered the Exxon Valdez oil spill, a major environmental disaster that occurred in Prince William Sound.

From 2003 to 2010, Mauer gained national attention of his coverage of the Alaska political corruption probe, exposing the corruption of Allen and members of the Alaska House of Representatives and the Alaska Senate. In 2011, he covered the guilty pleas of Pete Kott, the speaker of the Alaska House, and Vic Kohring, a member of the Alaska House. In 2017, he left the Anchorage Daily News.

== Personal life and death ==
Mauer was married to Barb Jacobs. Their marriage lasted until Mauer's death in 2026.

In 2023, Mauer was diagnosed with frontotemporal dementia. He died in Seattle, Washington on February 23, 2026, at the age of 76.
