= John T. Georgopoulos =

American sportswriter

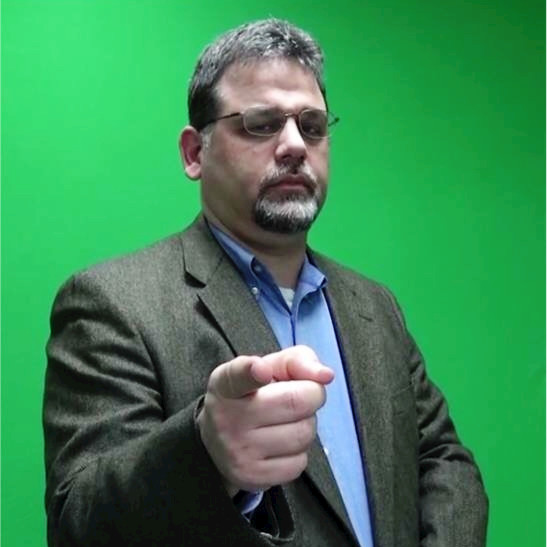
- Born: April 20, 1965 (age 61); Bronx, NY
- Education: Bronx High School of Science; B.A. in Biology, B.S. in Computer Science; Fordham University
- Occupations: Data Analyst; Fantasy Sports pioneer
- Employer(s): Distant Warrior Productions; Sports Grumblings LLC
- Height: 6 ft 3 in (191 cm)

John Tilemachos Georgopoulos is a fantasy sports writer, radio host and computer/data scientist of Greek ancestry, whose work involving fantasy football analytics has been prominent in the fantasy industry since 1994.

== Education and early career ==
Georgopoulos graduated from the Bronx High School of Science in 1982, where he was classmates with Terence Tolbert, the late political operative for Barack Obama and Christopher "Kid" Reid, the rap musician and actor.

After four years at Fordham University, Georgopoulos graduated in 1986 with degrees in Computer Science and Biology. While still in university, his interest in meshing fantasy sports with computer science became evident as he created a fantasy wrestling game—dubbed Sgt. Slaughter's Matwars—which was a basis of the formation of the Silverline Games entertainment company.

While working as a programmer for an investment bank in 1994, Georgopoulos produced a simple website, with the goal of teaching himself HTML; he chose this forum to express his views on one of his favorite topics: professional football (the NFL).

== Fantasy sports journalism career ==
Georgopoulos' website received enough hits to encourage Georgopoulos to regularly update his commentary, as well as recruit former owners in his college roto leagues to provide additional content. By 1996, Gridiron Grumblings was born, one of the first independent sites of sports commentary

The site received several awards, including Netscape's "Cool Site of the Month" and "Cool Site of the Day", a 'Top Site' recognition by Yahoo! Magazine as well as a recommended site of FHM Magazine.

In 1998, drawing on his experience in FOREX markets and as a programmer, Georgopoulos designed the "Fantasy Forecast Rating System", a ranking system to be used across all NFL positions, enabling the absolute valuation of players. Its success as a tool for fantasy football owners led to the concept being applied to all the major fantasy sports: baseball, basketball and hockey. Applications of his techniques were picked up by Sports Illustrated, which ran Georgopoulos' content.

Internet Audio Broadcasts as early as 1996, Georgopoulos was producing one-hour audio broadcasts, which were made available to his readers. Dubbed "WGRD Radio", there were 117 episodes recorded through September 11, 2001. His first-person account of the 9/11 attacks on the World Trade Center marked the final broadcast of WGRD Radio.

In 2004, WGRD Radio was reincarnated as Gridiron Grumblings Live!, a two-hour live broadcast covering fantasy football, the NFL and other topical events.

Individual Defensive Players (IDPs) in standard fantasy football leagues. While a staple of fantasy football drafts today, the inclusion of IDPs in 1996-97 was considered FFL heresy. Consistency Rankings was a metric designed to describe the degree to which a set of player performances varied—either over the course of a season or a career which was in essence, the application of a Coefficient of Variance to fantasy play. Age Variance was a metric to define the statistical effect of player age on performance, by position.

On Sept. 4, 2010, Georgopoulos premiered a new weekly show, Sports Grumblings Live!, on SiriusXM Satellite radio. The show was a three-hour broadcast focusing on all the major fantasy sports, concurrently entertaining and informing the listeners. The show had a time slot of 8-11 PM ET on Saturday nights, on Sirius 210| XM 87. Sirius/XM decided not to renew the show for a second season.

In 2013, Georgopoulos accepted an offer to be a featured fantasy football writer at Fantasy Sharks.com.

In 2020, Georgopoulos left Fantasy Sharks to form a new fantasy sports site, Nerd Fantasy Sports, which leveraged the talents of data scientists and veteran fantasy sports journalists.

In 2022, Georgopoulos partnered with fellow fantasy sports pioneer William Del Pilar to re-launch Sports Grumblings. This iteration will have a heavier focus on podcasts and visual shows, as well as an emphasis on its original mission of sports commentary.

== Other ventures ==
Georgopoulos has also taken the time to dabble in the entertainment industry; he has produced, directed and performed in two comedy series (for which he is also credited as a writer) on the Amazon Prime Video platform, Net News (2018) and Back to the Stone Age (2021). Additionally, he is credited as a writer and producer for the unreleased series Celebrapy (2015). Georgopoulos has co-hosted That Riot Show, a podcast found on YouTube, iTunes and other platforms, since 2015.

== Personal life ==
Georgopoulos has publicly identified himself as a libertarian, both politically and philosophically.

== Awards and recognition ==
- Winner of the 2006 Fantasy Sports Writers Association award for best fantasy football series (for Fantasy Forecast - The Strategy Series)
- Following his 2014 Nomination, a nine-time finalist for various Fantasy Sports Writer Association (FSWA) awards
