= Deborah Frank Lockhart =

American mathematician

- Citizenship: United States
- Education: Rensselaer Polytechnic Institute
- Awards: Fellow of the American Mathematical Society
- Scientific career
- Fields: Mathematics
- Workplaces: National Science Foundation
- Thesis: Dynamic buckling of imperfection-sensitive structures (1974)

Deborah Frank Lockhart is a mathematician known for her work with the National Science Foundation.

== Career ==
Lockhart graduated in 1965 from the Bronx High School of Science. She received her BS in mathematics from New York University, and went on to receive her Ph.D. from Rensselaer Polytechnic Institute in the area of continuum mechanics.

Lockhart went on to work at SUNY Geneseo before moving to Michigan Technological University in 1976. She began working as a program director at the National Science Foundation in 1988, later becoming a deputy division director and acting division director before, in 2016, being named deputy assistant director of the Directorate for Mathematical and Physical Sciences.

== Awards and honors ==
In 2012, Lockhart became a fellow of the American Mathematical Society. Also that year, she became a fellow of the American Association for the Advancement of Science. She is also the 2021 recipient of the Society for Industrial and Applied Mathematics (SIAM) Prize for Distinguished Service to the Profession.

== Selected publications ==
- Lockhart, Deborah F. Dynamic buckling of a damped imperfect column on a nonlinear foundation. Quart. Appl. Math. 36 (1978/79), no. 1, 49–55.
