= Terence Tolbert =

American political operative (1964–2008)

- Born: Terence D. Tolbert; 1964; New York City, U.S.
- Died: November 2, 2008 (aged 43–44)
- Education: Bronx High School of Science; Hunter College
- Occupation: Political operative
- Spouse: Freida Foster-Tolbert

Terence D. Tolbert (1964 – November 2, 2008) was an American political operative who was the Nevada state director for Barack Obama's 2008 presidential campaign and an aide to Joel Klein, the New York City School Chancellor. Tolbert's death came two days before the 2008 presidential election, and the same day as Obama's grandmother.

== Biography ==
Tolbert was born and raised in Harlem. He graduated from the Bronx High School of Science, where he was a classmate of Christopher "Kid" Reid, the rap musician and actor, and John T. Georgopoulos, a fantasy sports writer. He later earned a bachelor's degree from Hunter College. He had lived in Harlem with his wife, Freida Foster-Tolbert.

Tolbert started his career in politics when he worked at the New York State Senate Minority Program Office in Albany. He also served on the staff of State Senators Martin Connor and Joseph L. Galiber, and for Representative Charles B. Rangel.

He was the chief of staff to New York State Assemblyman Keith L. T. Wright for eight years. In 2003 and 2004, Tolbert was the New York state director for the presidential campaign of John Edwards. Tolbert had taken a leave from his position as chief of staff to Assemblyman Wright, who was in turn supporting John Kerry's presidential bid.

After leaving the Edwards campaign in 2004, Tolbert was the Nevada state director of America Coming Together, a 527 group dedicated to get out the vote efforts, primarily for Democratic candidates. Tolbert served as the liaison to ethnic, religious and cultural groups in the city for Mayor of New York City Michael Bloomberg in his bid for a second term in the 2005 mayoral election. He had also worked on the campaigns of Senator Chuck Schumer and former Governor of New York Eliot Spitzer.

Tolbert was hired by the New York City Department of Education in 2006, serving as its primary representative in Albany, New York and Washington, D.C. lobbying on behalf of Bloomberg's efforts to extend the law due to expire in June 2009 that grants the mayor primary authority over the New York City public schools.

He took a leave of absence from the Department of Education in July to work in Nevada as state director for the Obama campaign, with the Democrats making a strong effort in a state that had traditionally been solidly Republican. Barack Obama took Nevada's five electoral votes, defeating John McCain by a 56%-42% margin, carrying Nevada by 120,000 votes in a state the George W. Bush had won by 20,000 votes in the 2004 election.

On the evening of November 2, 2008, in North Las Vegas, Nevada, Tolbert suffered a heart attack while driving alone near the Obama campaign offices. He was taken to North Vista Hospital and died there, aged 44.

== Legacy ==
In a press release, Mayor Bloomberg described Tolbert as one of the most likeable and hardworking people in the world and "a valued member of our administration" who "had become a personal friend". Schools Chancellor Klein eulogized Tolbert as someone "who believed deeply that government can and must play a constructive role in improving the lives of its citizens" in his role as Executive Director of Inter-Governmental Relations. A statement issued by the Obama campaign characterized Tolbert as "a strong force in this campaign, with a positive outlook that brought people together."

Tolbert's funeral was held at the Cathedral of St. John the Divine.

Tolbert's middle school in Harlem was named after him in November 2008, as a memorial.

He was survived by his wife and mother.
