= Morris Meister =

- Born: October 20, 1895; Goniądz, Russian Empire
- Died: August 10, 1975 (aged 79); New York University Hospital, Manhattan, New York, U.S.
- Education: City College of New York; Columbia University
- Notable work: Science for a Better World series of textbooks
- Spouse: Florence Suzi Glickstein Meister
- Children: 2, Anna Meister Burton, a psychoanalyst, and Alton Meister, noted bio-chemist

Academic background
- Thesis: The Educational Value of Certain After-school Materials and Activities in Science (1921)

Academic work
- Institutions: Bronx Community College, Bronx High School of Science, New York Hall of Science

Morris Meister (1895 - 1975) was a science educator and administrator who was the founder and first principal of the Bronx High School of Science as well as the first president of Bronx Community College. He is noteworthy for his support and application of laboratory-based methods in science education as well as interdisciplinary study.

== Early life and education ==
Morris Meister was born on October 20, 1895, in Gonietz, Poland to Harris Meister and Jennie (Kolovsky) Meister. The Meister family moved to Manhattan's Lower East Side when Morris was 7 years old. He attended the City College of New York, where he became a member of Phi Beta Kappa. His doctoral thesis at the Teachers College of Columbia University in 1921, The Educational Value of Certain After-school Materials and Activities in Science, focused on the role of science related toys in science education.

Meister married Florence Suzi Glickstein, a music teacher, in 1921. They had two children, Anna Meister Burton, a psychoanalyst, and Alton Meister, a noted biochemist.

== Career ==
Morris Meister worked as a science teacher in a number of schools in New York City including Stuyvesant High School (1916), The Speyer School (1916-1918), and Horace Mann School (1917-1922). He was instrumental in the creation of science fairs while working as a committee head of the American Institute of the City of New York in the 1932s. He served as the second president of the National Science Teachers Association. Meister wrote a series of science textbooks called Science for a Better World. He was the founding principal of the Bronx High School of Science from 1938 to 1958, followed by becoming the founding president of the Bronx Community College from 1959 to 1966. After retirement he worked as the director of planning at the New York Hall of Science, in Corona, Queens.

== Legacy ==
Meister Auditorium, the Auditorium of the Bronx High School of Science, is named after Dr. Meister. His portrait is displayed at its doors.

Meister Hall, a building on the campus of Bronx Community College, is named after Dr. Meister.

Academic offices
Preceded by none	President of the Bronx Community College; 1959 — 1966	Succeeded by James A. Colston
Preceded by none	Principal of the Bronx High School of Science; 1938 — 1958	Succeeded by Dr. Alexander Taffel
