= Jill Bargonetti =

American professor at Hunter College

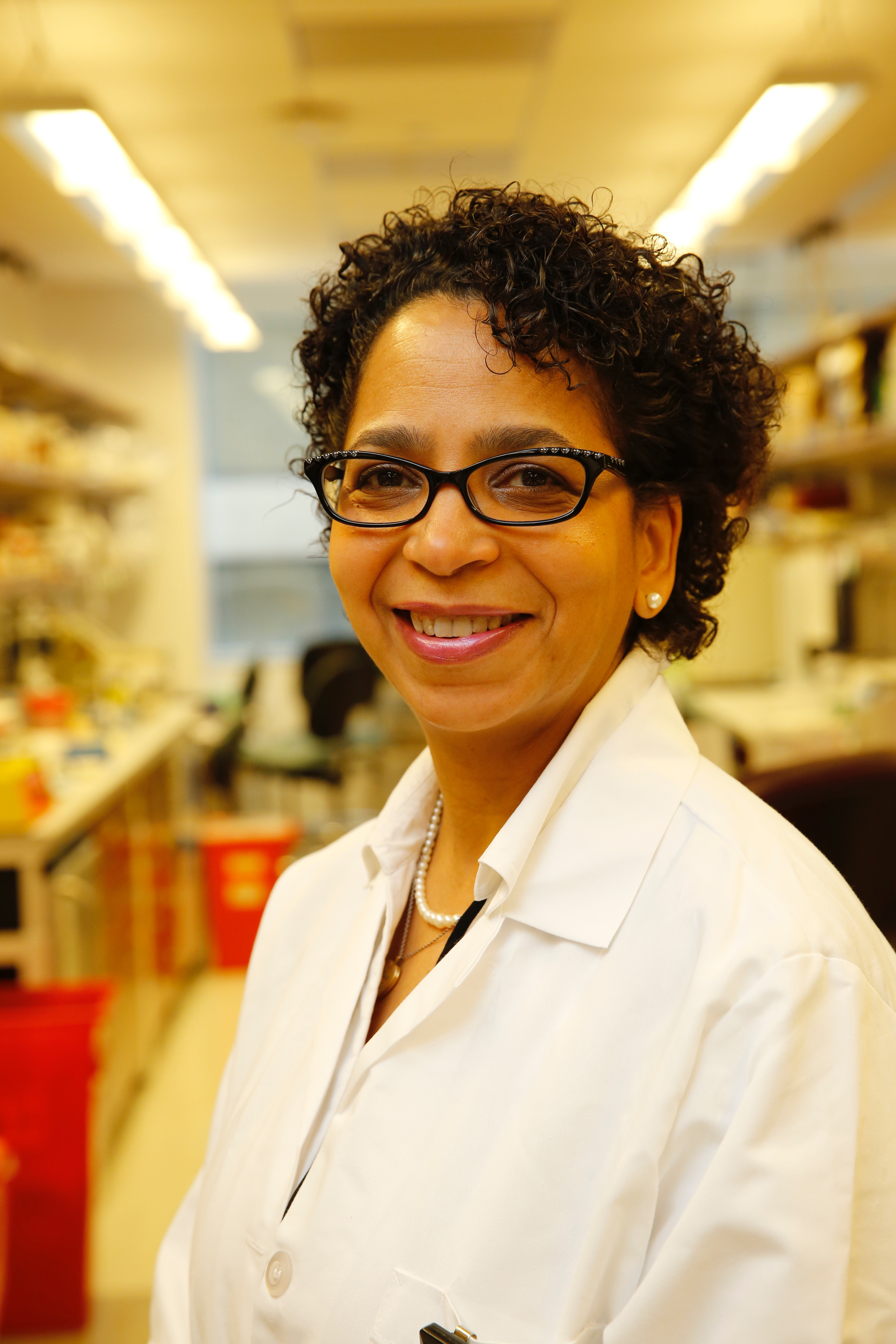
- Born: New York, NY, U.S.
- Citizenship: American
- Education: New York University
- Known for: p53
- Awards: Presidential Early Career Award for Scientists and Engineers (1997)
- Scientific career
- Fields: Cancer Research
- Workplaces: Hunter College

Jill Bargonetti (born October 10, 1962) is an American professor at the City University of New York with dual appointments at Hunter College and The Graduate Center. Her research is focused on tumor suppressor protein p53 and its role as an oncogene when it is mutated in breast cancer.

== Early life and education ==
Born on October 10, 1962, in New York Hospital, Jill Bargonetti is the daughter of Adah Askew and Arthur Bargonetti. Jill was born to a Black mother and an Italian American father. She grew up in a strategically multi-ethnic and culturally diverse Mitchel-Lama housing development on Manhattan’s Upper West Side. Bargonetti attended three of New York City’s special public schools: Hunter College Elementary School, Hunter College High School and The Bronx High School of Science. She went on to attend the State University of New York at Purchase where she majored in biology and dance and earned a B.A. in Biology. She then received her Masters from New York University in 1987 followed by her Ph.D. from NYU in 1990. She did a postdoctoral fellowship at Columbia University from 1990 until 1994, where she worked alongside Dr. Carol Prives. There, she characterized important functions of p53 needed for tumor suppression and that they were lost when p53 is mutated in cancer.

== Career ==
Bargonetti’s first professional positions in the 1980s were as a dancer with a Harlem-based dance company called Dianne McIntyre’s Sounds in Motion and as a research technician at Rockefeller University. Following her doctoral and postdoctoral training, in 1994 Bargonetti became an assistant professor at The City University of New York with appointments at Hunter College and The Graduate Center. She chose the City University of New York in part to be a role model for other people from groups underrepresented in the sciences. In 1997, she was awarded the Presidential Early Career Award for Scientists and Engineers from President Bill Clinton for “scholarly work in cancer related studies of cell growth and gene expression and involvement of undergraduate, graduate and especially minority students in the discovery process.” She became a full professor at Hunter College in 2007, the Chair of the Molecular, Cellular, and Developmental Biology (MCD) PhD subprogram of the CUNY Graduate Center in 2009, and the leader of the New York Research and Mentoring for Postbaccalaureates (NY-RaMP) program at Hunter College in 2023.

Bargonetti has served on numerous National Committee’s to evaluate science and policy. Some of her appointments include a 2012-2018 Membership in The National Institutes of Health (NIH) Tumor Cell Biology Study Section Review Committee and a working as a member of The National Cancer Policy Board from 2002 to 2005.

Bargonetti was featured on a PBS series called "American Graduate Day" in 2015. Additionally, she spoke at a TedX "Borders and Belonging" event at City University of New York (CUNY) in 2016. She was noted as a New York University Graduate School of Arts and Sciences: Distinguished Alumna and a SUNY Purchase Presidential Distinguished Alumna. In 2017, Jill Bargonetti was inducted into the Bronx Science High School Hall of Fame.

== Research ==
Signal transduction pathways converging on the tumor suppressor p53 are central in the regulation of cell growth and cell death. Conventional chemotherapeutics result in p53 checkpoint activation. However, in cancers, when the p53 pathway is blocked, or mutated, a more targeted chemotherapeutic approach is required to result in cancer cell death. A focus on such targeted approaches are central to the research being carried out in the Bargonetti laboratory. The work focuses on the mutant p53, MDM2, and MDMX molecular signal transduction pathways. The Bargonetti team works to activate p53-independent cell death pathways that facilitate killing resistant cancer types. They carry out this work using human cancer cell line models, xenograft models, and C. elegans nematode models. The Bargonetti research team is using genetically engineered tools to decrease expression of and/or mutate the three oncogenes (i.e. MDM2, MDMX, and oncogenic mutant p53) because these biomarkers are involved in the formation of different subtypes of breast cancer. Their primary goal is to make the mutant p53 pathway "druggable."

== Honors and awards ==
- Presidential Early Career Award for Scientists and Engineers, from President Bill Clinton
- The New York City Mayor’s Award for Excellence in Science and Technology
- New York Voice Award
- Kathy Keeton Mountain Top Award from the New York branch of the NAACP
- Outstanding Woman Scientist Award from the Association for Women in Science
- Bronx Science High School Hall of Fame.
- SUNY Purchase Presidential Distinguished Alumni/ae Award
- New York University Graduate School of Arts and Sciences: Distinguished Alumni/ae Award
