= Martin S. Fiebert =

American professor of psychology

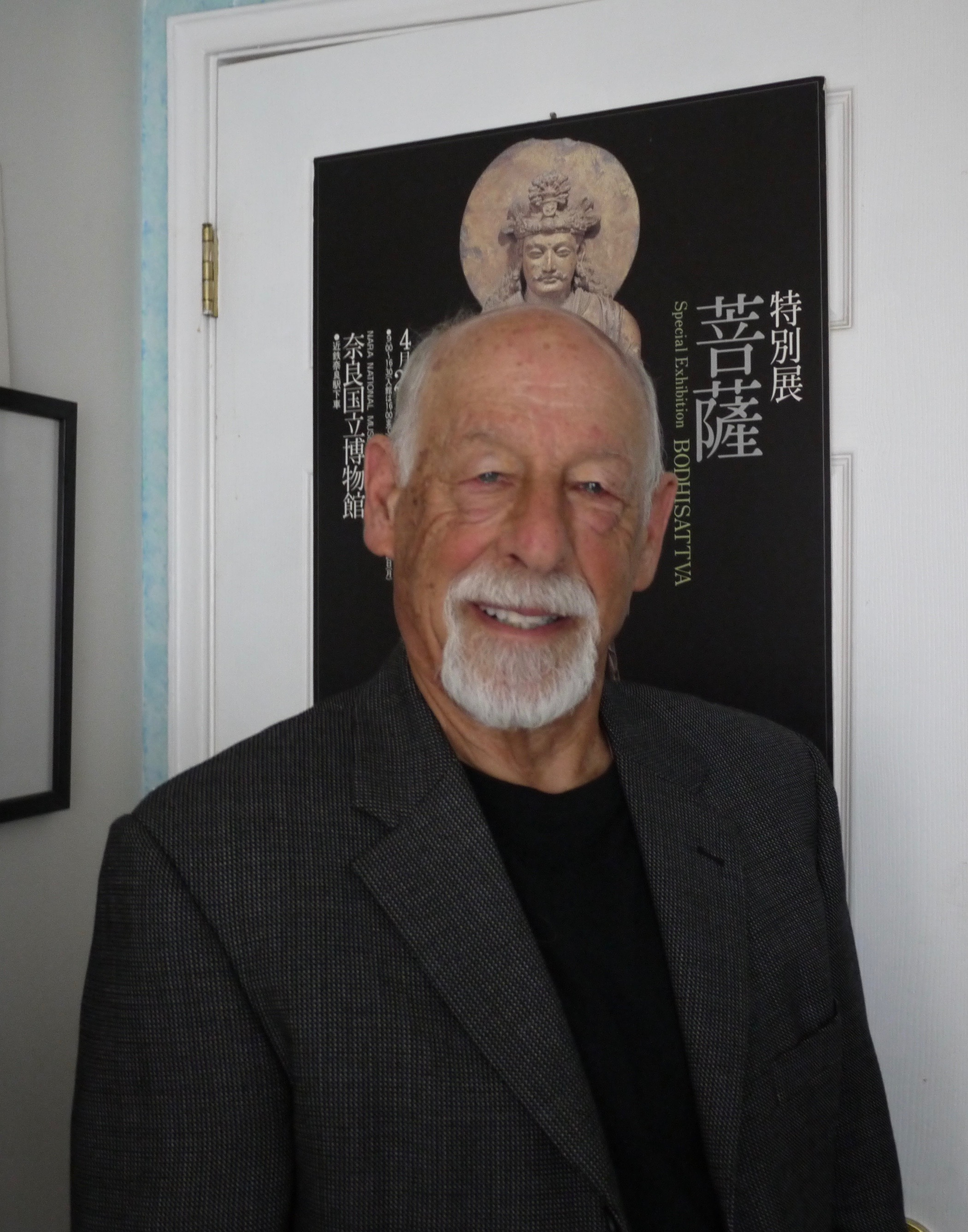
- Education: Queens College, City University, New York (B.S.); University of Rochester (PhD)
- Scientific career
- Workplaces: California State University, Long Beach
- Website: web.csulb.edu/~mfiebert/

Martin S. Fiebert (born 1939), is an emeritus professor at California State University, Long Beach in the Department of Psychology. He has published more than 70 articles in peer-reviewed journals.

== Early life and education ==
Fiebert was born in the Bronx, New York in 1939. He graduated from Bronx High School of Science in 1956, and received his B.S. degree from Queens College, City University of New York in 1960. He received his Ph.D. in clinical psychology from the University of Rochester in 1965 and completed his thesis, "Cognitive Styles in the Deaf", under the direction of Professor Emory L. Cowen.

== Research and career ==
Fiebert is known for his work on a series of annotated bibliographies which demonstrate that women are as physically aggressive as men in their relationships with spouses or male partners.

He has also published a series of articles that explore the early history of psychoanalysis. In particular, he examined the relationship between Sigmund Freud and Carl Jung in a paper entitled "Sex, Lies, and Letters" as well as a paper examining the history of Sigmund Freud and Alfred Adler's relationship, which was published in the Adlerian journal, Individual Psychology.

Other major areas in which he has published include friendship, meditation, interracial dating, and social media behavior, particularly Facebook activities.

Fiebert has been involved in the area of Transpersonal Psychology as a student, teacher, and researcher. He was influenced by the writings and had personal interactions with such teachers as Ram Dass, Swami Satchidananda, and Chogyam Trungpa. He was also a student of Ralph Metzner, from whom he learned basic Agni Yoga techniques developed by Russell Schofield. Most recently, he has engaged with the teachings and techniques of a Tibetan master, Djwhal Khul.

Fiebert has been a faculty member at California State University, Long Beach since 1965. He retired as a full professor in 2016 and is currently teaching in the Psychology Department as an adjunct faculty. From 2001 to 2003, Fiebert served as the president of the Long Beach Chapter of the California Faculty Association.

== Awards and honors ==
Fiebert was selected in 2018 to give the annual Honorary Legacy Lecture at CSULB. His presentation focused on the Top Ten Highlights of his academic career. In 2016 he was invited to present the Keynote speech at the Toronto Domestic Violence Symposium.
