= Alexander Taffel =

Dr. Alexander Taffel (born in Odessa; died January 19, 1997, Riverdale, Bronx) was the second principal of the Bronx High School of Science, a long-time physics teacher and author of three textbooks in Physics. He is a recipient of the NBC Award for Public Service. He is most famous for his tenure as principal of the Bronx High School of Science, during which he nurtured the institution and its international reputation. He retired in 1978.

He died at his home of a stroke.

== Early life ==
Taffel came to New York when he was 3. He graduated from City College with a degree in mathematics in 1929 and later received a master's in physics from Columbia University and a Ph.D. in science education from New York University.

== Career ==
Before becoming a full time administrator, Taffel was a physics teacher who had become the chairman of the science department at James Monroe High School in the Bronx. Later he became principal of Haaren High School in Manhattan.

== Principal of the Bronx High School of Science (1958-1978) ==
Transfer to modern facilities, teacher strike, student strike, 50th anniversary

== Legacy ==
The Alexander Taffel Library at the Bronx High School of Science is named after Dr. Taffel.

Preceded by Dr. Morris Meister	Principal of The Bronx High School of Science; 1958 – 1977	Succeeded by Milton S. Kopelman
