= Bronx High School of Science =

Specialized high school in New York City

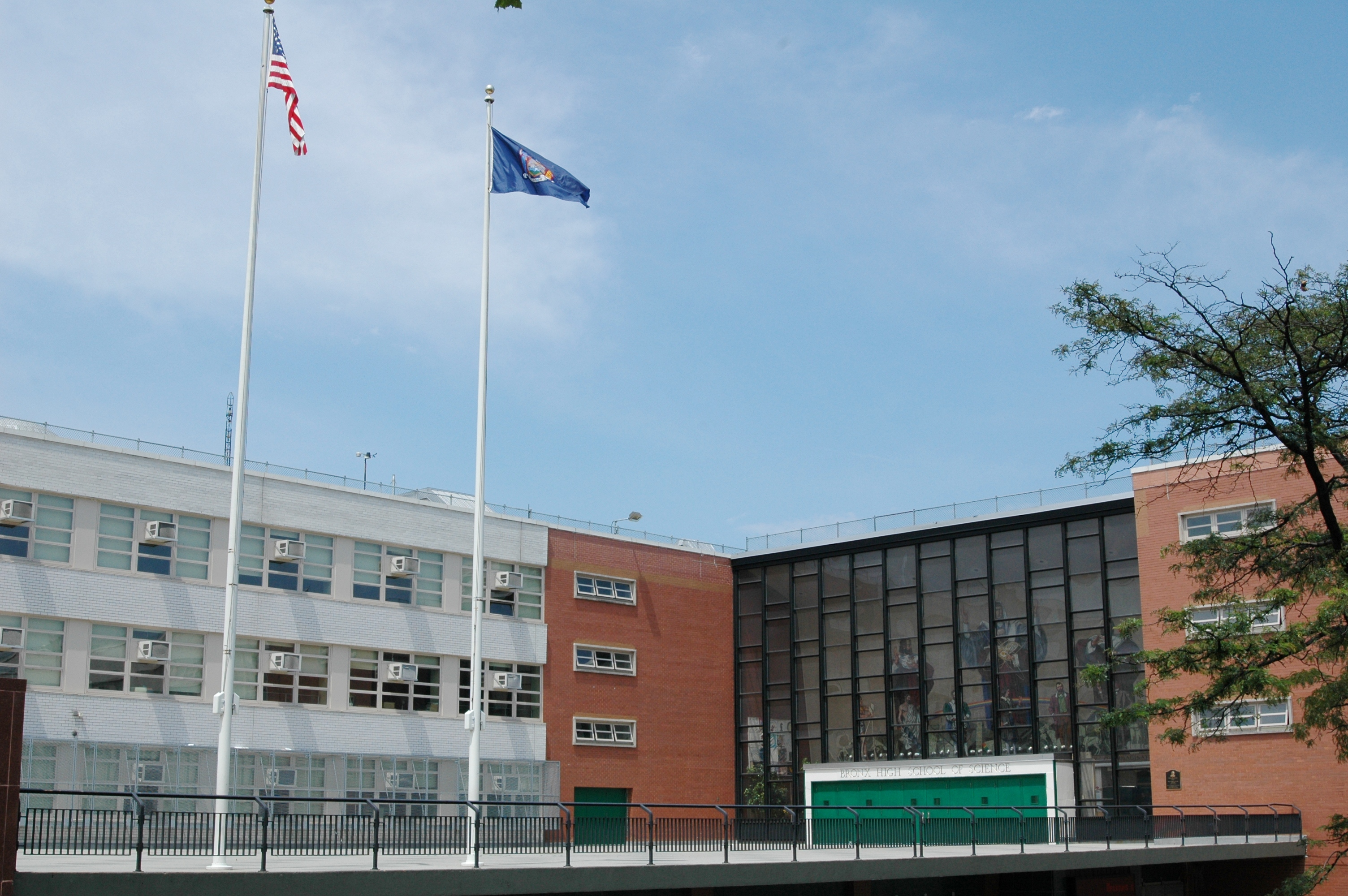
- Bronx High School of Science in July 2006

Location
- 75 W 205th St; Bronx, New York 10468; United States; 40°52′42″N 73°53′27″W

Information
- Type: Public, selective school
- Motto: Inquire, Discover, Create
- Established: 1938; 88 years ago
- Founder: Morris Meister
- School district: New York City Department of Education
- School number: X445
- NCES School ID: 360008701922
- Principal: Rachel Hoyle
- Teaching staff: 141.42 (on an FTE basis)
- Grades: 9–12
- Enrollment: 2,956 (2024–2025)
- Student to teacher ratio: 20.8
- Campus: City: Large
- Colors: Green and gold
- Athletics conference: PSAL
- Mascot: Wolverines
- Newspaper: The Science Survey
- Yearbook: The Observatory
- Affiliation: National Consortium of Secondary STEM Schools
- Nobel laureates: 9
- Website: www.bxscience.edu
- Bronx Science's previous logo, used until 2014.

The Bronx High School of Science is a public specialized high school founded in 1938 in the Bronx in New York City. Admission involves passing the Specialized High Schools Admissions Test. The school is operated by the New York City Department of Education.

Founded by science educator Morris Meister who served as its first principal, Bronx Science is located in what is now Kingsbridge Heights, also known as Jerome Park, a neighborhood in the northwest portion of the Bronx. Known for its focus on mathematics and science, Bronx Science also emphasizes the humanities and social sciences.

The Bronx High School of Science is often called Bronx Science, Bronx Sci, BX Sci, and sometimes just Science. It was formerly called Science High, and founder Morris Meister is said to have frequently called the school "The High School of Science".

== History ==
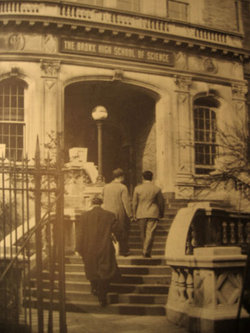
The former Gothic building at Creston Avenue and 184th Street that housed the school from its founding in 1938 until 1959

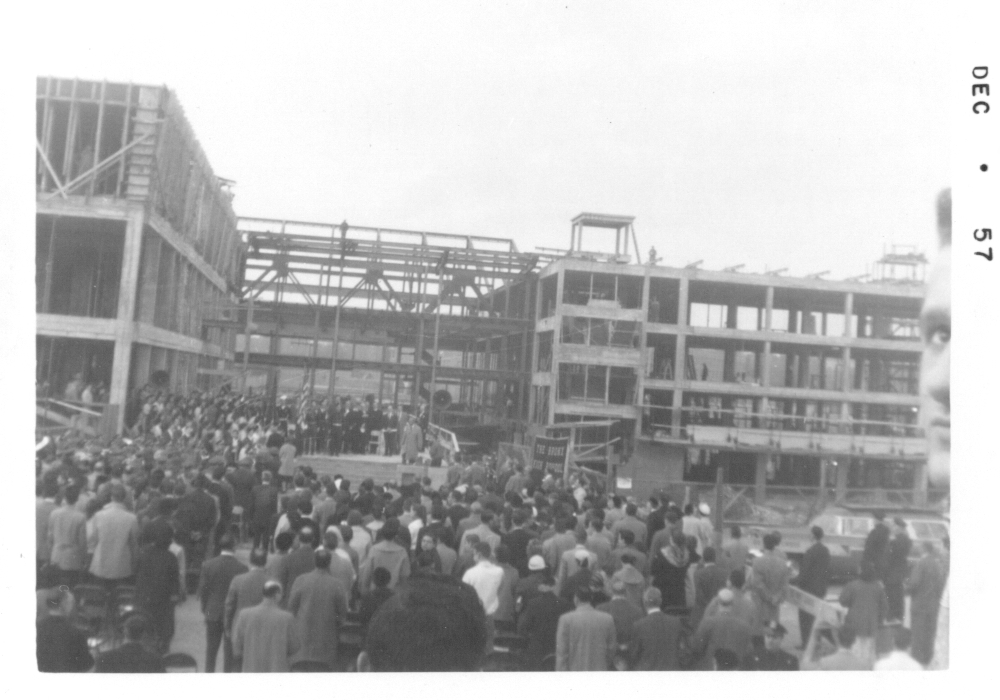
Dedication of the new building in 1957

The Bronx High School of Science was founded in 1938 as a specialized science and math high school for boys, by resolution of the New York City Panel for Educational Policy, with Morris Meister as the first principal of the school. Meister put his imprint on the school from its formation, for example selecting as school colors "green to represent chlorophyll and gold the sun, both of which are essential to the chain of life."

The school was given use of an antiquated Gothic building adorned with gargoyles at Creston Avenue and 184th Street, in the Fordham Road-Grand Concourse area of the Bronx. The building, built in 1918 for Evander Childs High School, had been successively occupied by Walton High School (1930) and by an annex of DeWitt Clinton High School (1935). The initial faculty were composed in part by a contingent from Stuyvesant High School.

From the beginning, the Parents Association and Meister campaigned for a new building. The number of students exceeded the capacity of the building on 184th Street, so the top floor of Public School 85 on Marion Avenue and 187th Street was used as the "Annex". The school started with about 150 ninth year students and 250 tenth year students, the remaining facilities of the building being used by DeWitt Clinton. As more boys began to attend Science, the Clinton contingent was gradually returned to its own main building. During their joint occupation, which lasted for two years until 1940, the two schools had separate teaching staff and classes, but the same supervision and administration.

In 1946, as a result of the efforts of Meister, the faculty, and the Parents Association, the school became co-ed, giving girls of New York City equal opportunity to pursue a quality education in a specialized high school, previously denied to them. This expansion to co-education preceded its rivals Stuyvesant (1969) and Brooklyn Tech (1972) by more than two decades.

In 1958, after 20 years as principal of the school, Meister resigned to become the first president of the newly organized Bronx Community College. Meister personally selected a teacher, Alexander Taffel, to succeed him as principal.

After twenty years, plans were finally completed for a new $8 million building, which was designed by the architectural firm of Emery Roth and Sons. The new building was on 205th Street near Bedford Park Boulevard between DeWitt Clinton High School and its large football field on one side, and Harris Field and Hunter College (now Lehman College) on the other. On March 3, 1959, under the guidance of Principal Taffel, students and faculty occupied the new building for the first time. Books were moved from the old library to the new by enlisting the students to each take home five library books from the old building on Friday and return them to the new building on Monday.

The new building was equipped with more modern classrooms, laboratories, and technical studio areas. The main lobby entrance featured a 63-foot (19 m), Venetian glass mosaic mural overhead, depicting major figures from the history of science such as Marie Curie and Charles Darwin under the protective hands of a God-like figure representing knowledge, with this quote from John Dewey: "Every great advance in science has issued from a new audacity of imagination." The mural, Humanities Protecting Biology, Physics, Chemistry, is an original work by Frank J. Reilly. Legions of students over the years, bemoaning the lack of swimming facilities, have sarcastically referred to the mural as "the Science swimming pool", perpetuating the untrue thesis that a choice was made to fund a mural rather than a pool in the new building.

When Bronx Science celebrated its silver anniversary in June 1963, President John F. Kennedy hailed it as "a significant and pathfinding example of a special program devoted to the development of the student gifted in science and mathematics."

== Academics ==
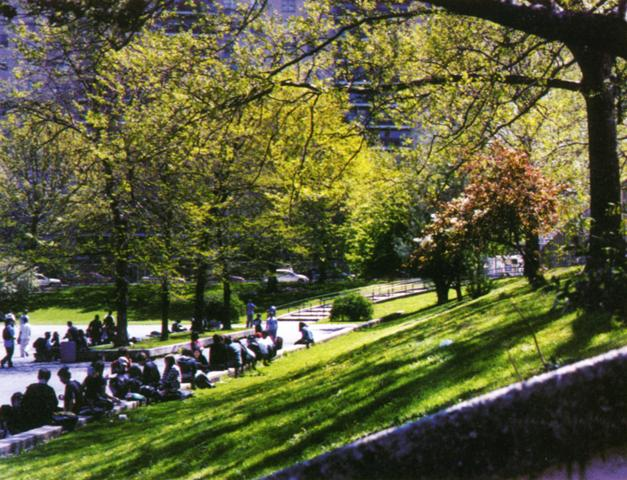
Bronx Science is the only specialized New York City high school with a campus

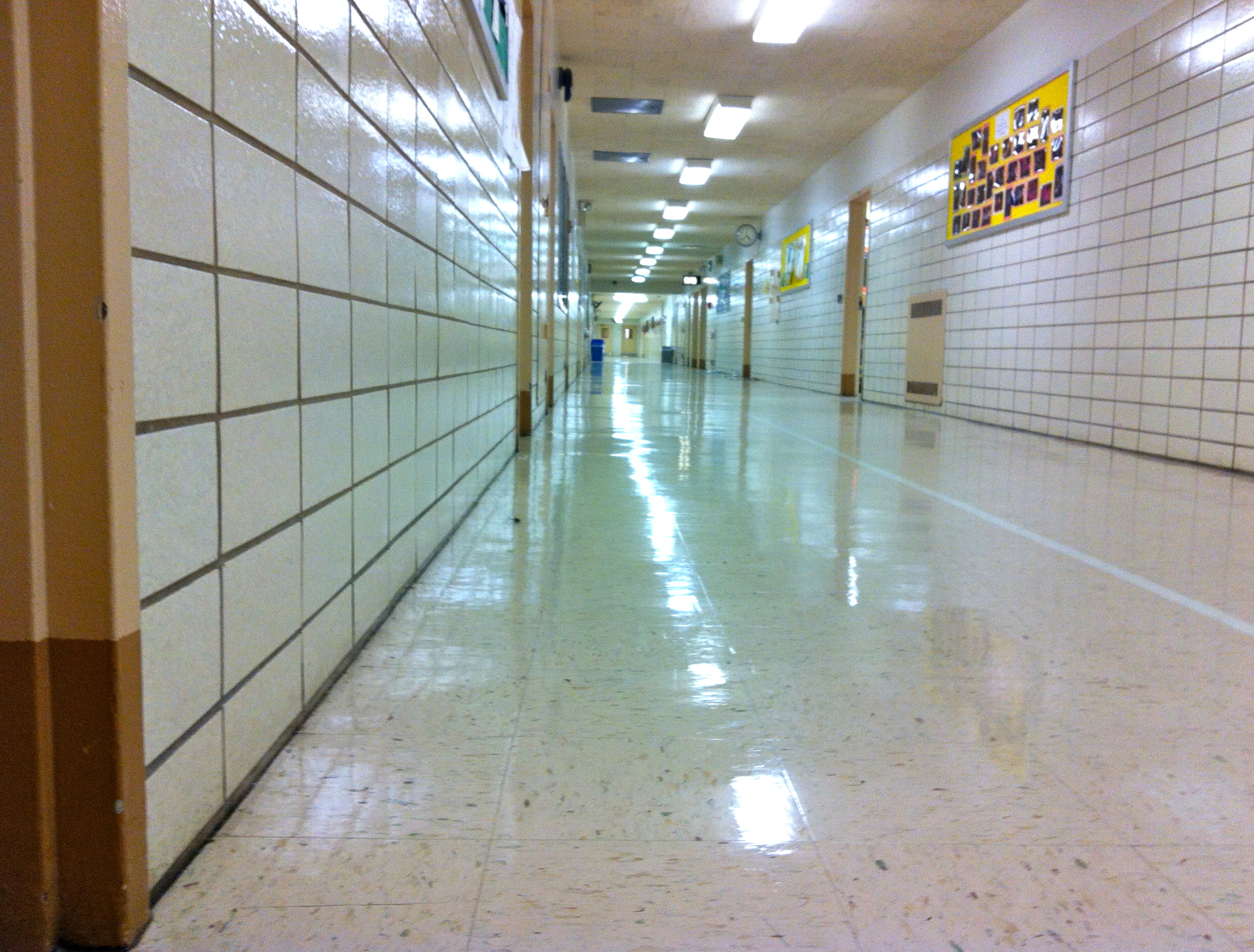
A hallway on the first floor of Bronx Science

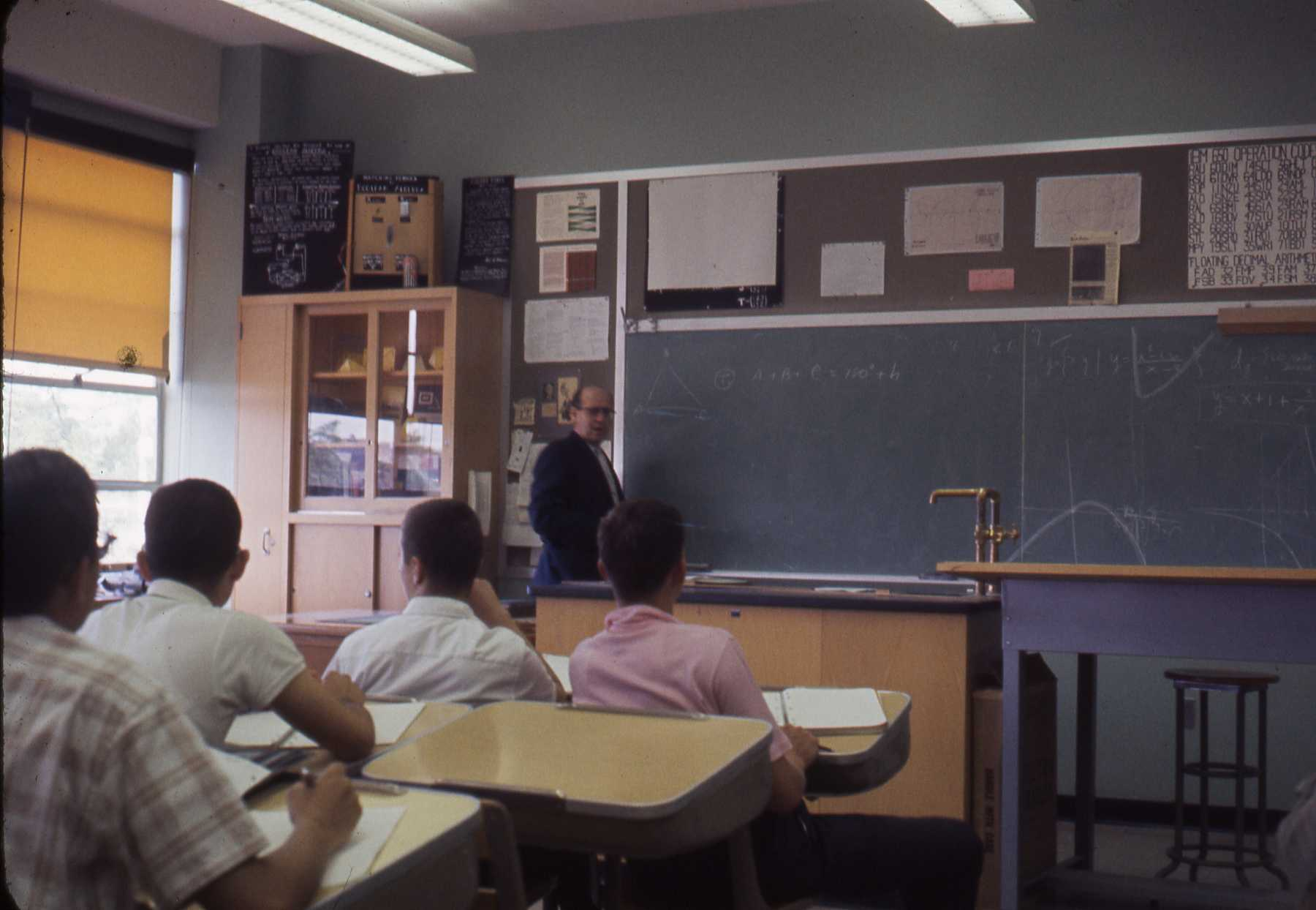
A math and computer programming class at the school in 1960, featuring an IBM 650 op code chart (upper right). Bronx High School of Science was one of the first high schools to teach computer courses. The school had a keypunch machine, students ran their programs at the Watson lab at Columbia University, and the school obtained its own computer, an IBM 1620, a year and a half later.

Bronx Science students take a college preparatory curriculum that includes four years of science, English, and social studies; three (usually four) years of math; two or three years of foreign language; and a year of fine arts, with required courses and a wide selection of electives, including honors and advanced placement (AP) classes, which allow students to place out of introductory college science courses. Over 100 unique courses are offered. All New York State Regents classes are offered, with the exception of Earth and Space Sciences.

In the biological sciences, Bronx Science offers a special honors biology course, in addition to the Regents-level course, which includes additional laboratory exposure and intensive content. If students have already taken the Living Environment regents in 8th grade, they may take Regents-level or honors chemistry in freshman year. All students must take at least one year of a biological lab science at Bronx Science, a requirement that can be satisfied either by freshman biology or, if students took biology in middle school, one of the many advanced electives offered, including AP Biology, AP Environmental Science, AP Psychology; non-AP advanced courses include animal behavior, cell biology, epidemiology, forensic science, microbiology, neuroscience, and nutritional science. Post-AP level classes in evolution, genetics, and psychology are also offered. In the physical science department, AP Chemistry and AP Physics are both offered, and both may be taken alongside introductory Regents-level courses in those respective classes. Electives offered include astronomy and astrophysics, electrical engineering, green design, organic chemistry, and post-AP Physics. In 2022, the school prepared to accept an astronomical observatory.

Freshmen at Bronx Science are required to take one-semester courses in research literacy and engineering, while sophomores take one-semester courses consisting of coding and rhetoric. Collectively, these are referred to as Foundational courses. Sophomore students may satisfy this requirement by instead taking a class in the research program, a three-year long program that culminates in an independent research project and final research paper that is submitted to Regeneron and other prestigious competitions in senior year. The research program is divided into biology, math, physical science/engineering, and social science research.

The mathematics department offers standard AP courses in AB/BC calculus, statistics, and computer science. Students can take precalculus alongside honors algebra 2 and trigonometry in their sophomore year, allowing them to take AP Calculus in their junior year. Post-AP courses in mathematics include multivariable calculus, linear algebra and differential equations, ordinary differential equations, video game development, app development, game theory, and a newly introduced course in financial and actuarial math.

Students are required to take four years of English. AP English Language and AP English Literature are offered, along with journalism workshop and yearbook design. In junior year, students have the option to take the unique AP American Studies course, an interdisciplinary course that correlates the AP English Language and AP United States History courses, while in senior year, the AP English Literature course is divided into courses in creative writing and traditional literature. Four years of social studies or history classes are required. AP European History and AP World History are both offered in sophomore year in preparation for the Global History Regents, while juniors can take AP United States History to satisfy the U.S. history requirement. Senior social studies classes consist of several combinations of AP classes in U.S. Government and Politics, Comparative Government and Politics, Microeconomics, and Macroeconomics. Additional classes in social studies, which must be taken along with these ones, include AP Human Geography, race and gender, and unique classes in Holocaust history and speech and debate leadership. A minimum of 2 years of languages are required, if students had previously taken a year of language prior to high school. Bronx Science offers French, Spanish, Latin, Italian, Chinese, and Japanese. At one time Hebrew, Russian, Korean, and German were also offered.

Students must also obtain credits from two terms of a class in the fine arts or the equivalent. The fine arts requirement is usually satisfied during Bronx Science's Summer Program which offers Drama, Music, and Art. Students usually "double up" on two of these courses to satisfy the fine arts requirement for once and all during the time period of one summer. Students are expected to satisfy the arts requirement by the end of sophomore year. Students can also take art or music electives during the school year to satisfy the fine arts requirement by taking a music elective such as jazz band or an arts elective such as AP Art History or AP 2D Art during the regular school year. Health and physical education courses are also required, and the Health requirement may also be fulfilled during the Bronx Science Summer Program in addition to the two fine arts courses.

=== Advanced placement courses ===
Bronx Science offers all of the AP courses, except for AP German Language and Culture, AP Precalculus, AP African American Studies, AP Computer Science Principles and the AP Capstone program. The courses include:

- English – AP English Literature and Composition, AP English Language and Composition
- Social Sciences – AP U.S. History, AP European History, AP World History, AP U.S. Government & Politics, AP Microeconomics, AP Macroeconomics, AP Economics (Microeconomics and Macroeconomics), AP Comparative Government & Politics with Economics, AP United States Government & Politics with Economics, AP Human Geography, AP Psychology
- Mathematics – AP Calculus AB, AP Calculus BC, AP Statistics, AP Computer Science A
- Science – AP Biology, AP Environmental Science, AP Chemistry, AP Physics 1&2 (without Calculus), AP Physics C (with Calculus)
- Language – AP Spanish Language, AP Spanish Literature, AP French Language and Culture, AP Italian Language and Culture, AP Latin (Caesar and Vergil), AP Chinese Language and Culture, AP Japanese Language and Culture
- Arts – AP Art History, AP Music Theory, AP 2D Art and Design

=== School publications ===
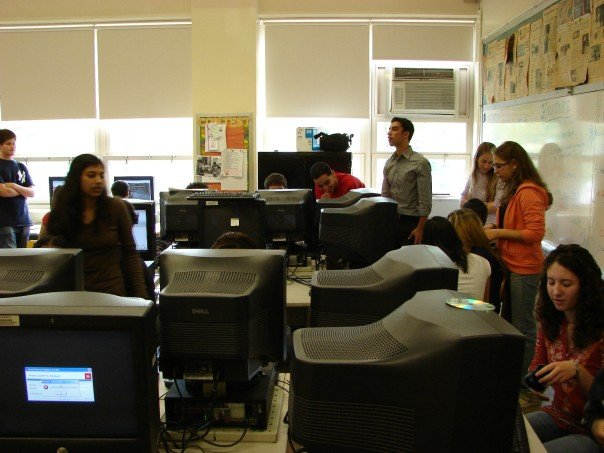
Bronx Science students working in 2006 on The Science Survey, one of several school publications

The Science Survey is Bronx Science's entirely student-run newspaper. Students manage everything: reporting, layout, design, editing, and final production, under the supervision of the journalism advisor. The paper is printed using funds from its advertisers, with no fiscal school support. The paper is distributed on average five times per year at no charge. The Science Survey has been the name of the Bronx Science student newspaper since the founding of the school in 1938.

Dynamo is the literary magazine sponsored by the English Department, consisting of original poems and stories submitted by students from all grades. The Observatory is Bronx Science's prize-winning yearbook. The yearbook office has a custom-built web server to manage its production, powered by MediaWiki and Coppermine software.

Vox Discipulorum is a student-led monthly publication sponsored by the World Language Department, providing students with a platform to creatively express their language and cultural experiences. Through essays, poems, and artwork, students showcase their linguistic skills and explore diverse cultures.

Other department-produced publications include the annual Math Bulletin, consisting of student term papers, original student mathematics research, and topics in mathematics; Exposition, an annual production of the Social Studies Department; and Reactions, written by physical science students.

== Reputation ==
Bronx Science has received international recognition and attracts an intellectually gifted blend of culturally, ethnically, and economically diverse students from New York City. In 2020, Newsweek's rankings of the top 5,000 STEM High Schools in the United States (public and private), listed Bronx Science as the 4th best STEM school in the nation.

In the United States, Bronx Science ranked 33rd in 2008 and 58th in 2009. In 2014, the school ranked 34th out of all high schools nationwide and 1st in New York; As of 2012, Bronx Science is ranked as one of the "22 top-performing schools" in America on The Washington Post as well as number 50 out of a list of the best 1,000 high schools in the country on The Daily Beast's "America's Best High Schools" list. In 2014 it was ranked second highest on Cities Journal's list of the "15 Best High Schools in New York", along with Stuyvesant (ranked third) and Brooklyn Tech (ranked eighth).

The average SAT score at Bronx Science was 1447 out of 1600. Bronx Science has counted 132 finalists in the Regeneron (formerly Intel) Science Talent Search, the largest number of any high school. Nine graduates have won Nobel Prizes—more than any other secondary education institution in the world—and nine have won Pulitzer Prizes. Of the nine Nobel Prizes earned by graduates, seven of them are in physics, which earned Bronx Science a designation by the American Physical Society as a "Historic Physics Site" in 2010. If Bronx Science were ranked as a nation, the nine Nobel Laureates who attended the school would place it 23rd, just ahead of The People's Republic of China and Spain, each of which have fostered eight Nobel Laureates.

Bronx Science is a member of the National Consortium of Secondary STEM Schools (NCSSS). Together with Stuyvesant High School and Brooklyn Technical High School, it is one of the three original specialized science high schools operated by the New York City Department of Education.

== Transportation ==
The New York City Subway's Bedford Park Boulevard (B and D trains) and Bedford Park Boulevard–Lehman College (4 train) stations are located nearby. Additionally, New York City Bus's Bx10, Bx22, Bx25, Bx26 and Bx28 routes stop near Bronx Science.

== Notable alumni ==
People who attended the Bronx High School of Science have achieved distinction in their respective fields, including winning the Nobel and Pulitzer Prizes, the Academy, Emmy and Turing Awards, the U.S. National Medal of Science, political office and numerous professional society honors. It has produced the most Nobel laureates of any secondary school in the world. Bronx Science alumni have also won three Turing Awards, sometimes unofficially referred to as the Nobel Prize in computer science; six National Medals of Science, the nation's highest scientific honor; and nine Pulitzer Prizes.

== In popular culture ==
Bronx Science was the primary rival of Millard Fillmore High School in Head of the Class, a television series that aired from 1986 to 1991.

The main character of Northern Exposure, Joel Fleischman, reveals he went to Bronx Science in Season 2, Episode 4.

Bronx Science formed the basis for the Midtown School of Science and Technology in Spider-Man: Homecoming, part of the Marvel Cinematic Universe, and actor Tom Holland attended for several days under an alias in preparation for his role as Peter Parker/Spiderman, with many other students or teachers unaware of the real reason for his attendance .

The main characters of the film See You Yesterday, produced by Spike Lee, attend Bronx Science.
