= List of winners of the National Book Award =

These authors and books have won the annual National Book Awards, awarded to American authors by the National Book Foundation based in the United States.

== History of categories ==
The National Book Awards were first awarded to four 1935 publications in May 1936. Contrary to that historical fact, the National Book Foundation currently recognizes only a history of purely literary awards that begins in 1950. The pre-war awards and the 1980 to 1983 graphics awards are covered below following the main list of current award categories.

There have been five award categories since 2018: Fiction, Non-fiction, Poetry, Young People's Literature, and Translated Literature. The main list below is organized by the current award categories and by year.

The categories' winners are selected from hundreds of preliminary nominees – "from 150 titles (Translated Literature) to upwards of 600 titles (Nonfiction)." Since 2013, a long list of ten entries for each of the categories has been selected and announced in September, followed by five finalists for each category in October, with the year's winners announced in November.

Repeat winners and split awards are covered at the bottom of the page.

== Current award categories ==
This section covers awards starting in 1950 in the five current categories as defined by their names. Some awards in "previous categories" may have been equivalent except in name.

=== Fiction ===
General fiction for adult readers is a National Book Award category that has been continuous since 1950, with multiple awards for a few years beginning 1980. From 1935 to 1941, there were six annual awards for novels or general fiction and the "Bookseller Discovery", the "Most Original Book"; both awards were sometimes given to a novel.

National Book Award for Fiction winners, 1950 to 1979
Year	Author	Title	Ref.
1950	Nelson Algren	The Man with the Golden Arm	
1951	William Faulkner	The Collected Stories of William Faulkner	
1952	James Jones	From Here to Eternity	
1953	Ralph Ellison	Invisible Man	
1954	Saul Bellow	The Adventures of Augie March	
1955	William Faulkner	A Fable	
1956	John O'Hara	Ten North Frederick	
1957	Wright Morris	The Field of Vision	
1958	John Cheever	The Wapshot Chronicle	
1959	Bernard Malamud	The Magic Barrel	
1960	Philip Roth	Goodbye, Columbus	
1961	Conrad Richter	The Waters of Kronos	
1962	Walker Percy	The Moviegoer	
1963	J. F. Powers	Morte d'Urban	
1964	John Updike	The Centaur	
1965	Saul Bellow	Herzog	
1966	Katherine Anne Porter	The Collected Stories of Katherine Anne Porter	
1967	Bernard Malamud	The Fixer	
1968	Thornton Wilder	The Eighth Day	
1969	Jerzy Kosinski	Steps	
1970	Joyce Carol Oates	them	
1971	Saul Bellow	Mr. Sammler's Planet	
1972	Flannery O'Connor	The Complete Stories	
1973 (Note: Split award.)	John Barth	Chimera	
1973	John Edward Williams	Augustus	
1974 (Note: Split award.)	Thomas Pynchon	Gravity's Rainbow	
1974	Isaac Bashevis Singer	A Crown of Feathers and Other Stories	
1975 (Note: Split award. In 1975, there were 12 winners in 10 award categories, although the Committee on Awards Policy, temporary administrator, "begged" judges not to split awards.)	Robert Stone	Dog Soldiers	
1975	Thomas Williams	The Hair of Harold Roux	
1976	William Gaddis	J R	
1977	Wallace Stegner	The Spectator Bird	
1978	Mary Lee Settle	Blood Tie	
1979	Tim O'Brien	Going After Cacciato	

Dozens of new categories were introduced in 1980, including "General fiction", hardcover and paperback, which are both listed here. (Note: Irving, Cheever, Maxwell, and Welty won the 1980 to 1983 awards for general paperback fiction. None were paperback originals. Indeed, all four had been losing finalists for the Fiction award in their hardcover editions (two 1979, two 1981).) The comprehensive "Fiction" genre and hard-or-soft format were both restored three years later.

National Book Award for Fiction winners, 1980–1983
Year	Category	Author	Title	Ref.
1980	Hardcover	William Styron	Sophie's Choice	
1980	Paperback	John Irving	The World According to Garp	
1981	Hardcover	Wright Morris	Plains Song	
1981	Paperback	John Cheever	The Stories of John Cheever	
1982	Hardcover	John Updike	Rabbit is Rich	
1982	Paperback	William Maxwell	So Long, See You Tomorrow	
1983	Hardcover	Alice Walker	The Color Purple	
1983	Paperback	Eudora Welty	The Collected Stories of Eudora Welty	

The comprehensive "Fiction" category returned in 1984.

National Book Award for Fiction winners, 1984 to present
Year	Author	Title	Ref
1984	Ellen Gilchrist	Victory Over Japan: A Book of Stories	
1985	Don DeLillo	White Noise	
1986	E.L. Doctorow	World's Fair	
1987	Larry Heinemann	Paco's Story	
1988	Pete Dexter	Paris Trout	
1989	John Casey	Spartina	
1990	Charles Johnson	Middle Passage	
1991	Norman Rush	Mating	
1992	Cormac McCarthy	All the Pretty Horses	
1993	E. Annie Proulx	The Shipping News	
1994	William Gaddis	A Frolic of His Own	
1995	Philip Roth	Sabbath's Theater	
1996	Andrea Barrett	Ship Fever and Other Stories	
1997	Charles Frazier	Cold Mountain	
1998	Alice McDermott	Charming Billy	
1999	Ha Jin	Waiting	
2000	Susan Sontag	In America	
2001	Jonathan Franzen	The Corrections	
2002	Julia Glass	Three Junes	
2003	Shirley Hazzard	The Great Fire	
2004	Lily Tuck	The News from Paraguay	
2005	William T. Vollmann	Europe Central	
2006	Richard Powers	The Echo Maker	
2007	Denis Johnson	Tree of Smoke	
2008	Peter Matthiessen	Shadow Country	
2009	Colum McCann	Let the Great World Spin	
2010	Jaimy Gordon	Lord of Misrule	
2011	Jesmyn Ward	Salvage the Bones	
2012	Louise Erdrich	The Round House	
2013	James McBride	The Good Lord Bird	
2014	Phil Klay	Redeployment	
2015	Adam Johnson	Fortune Smiles	
2016	Colson Whitehead	The Underground Railroad	
2017	Jesmyn Ward	Sing, Unburied, Sing	
2018	Sigrid Nunez	The Friend	
2019	Susan Choi	Trust Exercise	
2020	Charles Yu	Interior Chinatown	
2021	Jason Mott	Hell of a Book	
2022	Tess Gunty	The Rabbit Hutch	
2023	Justin Torres	Blackouts	
2024	Percival Everett	James	
2025	Rabih Alameddine	The True True Story of Raja the Gullible (and His Mother)	
2026	Hannah Lillith Assadi	Paradiso 17	

=== Nonfiction ===
General nonfiction for adult readers is a National Book Award category continuous only from 1984, when the general award was restored after two decades of awards in several nonfiction categories. From 1935 to 1941 there were six annual awards for general nonfiction, two for biography, and the Bookseller Discovery or Most Original Book was sometimes nonfiction.

National Book Award for Nonfiction winners, 1950–1959
Year	Author	Title	Ref.
1950	Ralph L. Rusk	The Life of Ralph Waldo Emerson	
1951	Newton Arvin	Herman Melville	
1952	Rachel Carson	The Sea Around Us	
1953	Bernard De Voto,	The Course of Empire	
1954	Bruce Catton	A Stillness at Appomattox	
1955	Joseph Wood Krutch	The Measure of Man	
1956	Herbert Kubly	An American in Italy	
1957	George F. Kennan	Russia Leaves the War	
1958	Catherine Drinker Bowen	The Lion and the Throne	
1959	J. Christopher Herold	Mistress to an Age: A Life of Madame de Staël	

Multiple nonfiction categories were introduced in 1964, initially Arts and Letters; History and (Auto)Biography; and Science, Philosophy and Religion. See also Contemporary and General Nonfiction. The comprehensive "Nonfiction" genre was restored twenty years later.

National Book Award for Nonfiction winners, 1984 to present
Year	Author	Title	Ref.
1984	Robert V. Remini	Andrew Jackson and the Course of American Democracy, 1833–1845	
1985	J. Anthony Lukas	Common Ground: A Turbulent Decade in the Lives of Three American Families	
1986	Barry Lopez	Arctic Dreams: Imagination and Desire in a Northern Landscape	
1987	Richard Rhodes	The Making of the Atomic Bomb	
1988	Neil Sheehan	A Bright Shining Lie: John Paul Vann and America in Vietnam	
1989	Thomas L. Friedman	From Beirut to Jerusalem	
1990	Ron Chernow	The House of Morgan: An American Banking Dynasty and the Rise of Modern Finance	
1991	Orlando Patterson	Freedom, Vol. 1: Freedom in the Making of Western Culture	
1992	Paul Monette	Becoming a Man: Half a Life Story	
1993	Gore Vidal	United States: Essays 1952–1992	
1994	Sherwin B. Nuland	How We Die: Reflections on Life's Final Chapter	
1995	Tina Rosenberg	The Haunted Land: Facing Europe's Ghosts After Communism	
1996	James Carroll	An American Requiem: God, My Father, and the War that Came Between Us	
1997	Joseph J. Ellis	American Sphinx: The Character of Thomas Jefferson	
1998	Edward Ball	Slaves in the Family	
1999	John W. Dower	Embracing Defeat: Japan in the Wake of World War II	
2000	Nathaniel Philbrick	In the Heart of the Sea: The Tragedy of the Whaleship Essex	
2001	Andrew Solomon	The Noonday Demon: An Atlas of Depression	
2002	Robert A. Caro	Master of the Senate: The Years of Lyndon Johnson	
2003	Carlos Eire	Waiting for Snow in Havana: Confessions of a Cuban Boy	
2004	Kevin Boyle	Arc of Justice: A Saga of Race, Civil Rights, and Murder in the Jazz Age	
2005	Joan Didion	The Year of Magical Thinking	
2006	Timothy Egan	The Worst Hard Time: The Untold Story of Those Who Survived the Great American Dust Bowl	
2007	Tim Weiner	Legacy of Ashes: The History of the CIA	
2008	Annette Gordon-Reed	The Hemingses of Monticello: An American Family	
2009	T. J. Stiles	The First Tycoon: The Epic Life of Cornelius Vanderbilt	
2010	Patti Smith	Just Kids	
2011	Stephen Greenblatt	The Swerve: How the World Became Modern	
2012	Katherine Boo	Behind the Beautiful Forevers: Life, Death, and Hope in a Mumbai Undercity	
2013	George Packer	The Unwinding: An Inner History of the New America	
2014	Evan Osnos	Age of Ambition: Chasing Fortune, Truth, and Faith in the New China	
2015	Ta-Nehisi Coates	Between the World and Me	
2016	Ibram X. Kendi	Stamped from the Beginning: The Definitive History of Racist Ideas in America	
2017	Masha Gessen	The Future Is History: How Totalitarianism Reclaimed Russia	
2018	Jeffrey C. Stewart	The New Negro: The Life of Alain Locke	
2019	Sarah M. Broom	The Yellow House	
2020	Les Payne and Tamara Payne	The Dead Are Arising: The Life of Malcolm X	
2021	Tiya Miles	All That She Carried: The Journey of Ashley’s Sack, a Black Family Keepsake	
2022	Imani Perry	South to America: A Journey Below the Mason-Dixon To Understand the Soul of a Nation	
2023	Ned Blackhawk	The Rediscovery of America: Native Peoples and the unmaking of US history	
2024	Jason De León	Soldiers and Kings	
2025	Omar El Akkad	One Day, Everyone Will Have Always Been Against This	
2026	Abdelrahman ElGendy	Huna: A Memoir of Revolution, Prison, and Becoming	

=== Poetry ===
National Book Award for Poetry winners, 1950 to present
Year	Author	Title	Ref.
1950	William Carlos Williams	Paterson: Book Three and Selected Poems	
1951	Wallace Stevens	The Auroras of Autumn	
1952	Marianne Moore	Collected Poems	
1953	Archibald MacLeish	Collected Poems, 1917–1952	
1954	Conrad Aiken	Collected Poems	
1955	Wallace Stevens	The Collected Poems of Wallace Stevens	
1956	W. H. Auden	The Shield of Achilles	
1957	Richard Wilbur	Things of This World	
1958	Robert Penn Warren	Promises: Poems, 1954–1956	
1959	Theodore Roethke	Words for the Wind	
1960	Robert Lowell	Life Studies	
1961	Randall Jarrell	The Woman at the Washington Zoo	
1962	Alan Dugan	Poems	
1963	William Stafford	Traveling Through the Dark	
1964	John Crowe Ransom	Selected Poems	
1965	Theodore Roethke	The Far Field	
1966	James Dickey	Buckdancer's Choice	
1967	James Merrill	Nights and Days	
1968	Robert Bly	The Light Around the Body	
1969	John Berryman	His Toy, His Dream, His Rest	
1970	Elizabeth Bishop	The Complete Poems	
1971	Mona Van Duyn	To See, To Take	
1972	Howard Moss	Selected Poems	
1972	Frank O'Hara	The Collected Works of Frank O'Hara	
1973	A. R. Ammons	Collected Poems, 1951–1971	
1974	Allen Ginsberg	The Fall of America: Poems of these States, 1965–1971	
1974	Adrienne Rich	Diving into the Wreck: Poems 1971–1972	
1975	Marilyn Hacker	Presentation Piece	
1976	John Ashbery	Self-portrait in a Convex Mirror	
1977	Richard Eberhart	Collected Poems, 1930–1976	
1978	Howard Nemerov	The Collected Poems of Howard Nemerov	
1979	James Merrill	Mirabell: Books of Numbers	
1980	Philip Levine	Ashes: Poems New and Old	
1981	Lisel Mueller	The Need to Hold Still	
1982	William Bronk	Life Supports: New and Collected Poems	
1983	Galway Kinnell	Selected Poems	
1983	Charles Wright	Country Music: Selected Early Poems	
Award eliminated
1991	Philip Levine	What Work Is	
1992	Mary Oliver	New and Selected Poems	
1993	A. R. Ammons	Garbage	
1994	James Tate	A Worshipful Company of Fletchers	
1995	Stanley Kunitz	Passing Through: The Later Poems	
1996	Hayden Carruth	Scrambled Eggs and Whiskey	
1997	William Meredith	Effort at Speech: New and Selected Poems	
1998	Gerald Stern	This Time: New and Selected Poems	
1999	Ai	Vice: New and Selected Poems	
2000	Lucille Clifton	Blessing the Boats: New and Selected Poems 1988–2000	
2001	Alan Dugan	Poems Seven: New and Complete Poetry	
2002	Ruth Stone	In the Next Galaxy	
2003	C. K. Williams	The Singing	
2004	Jean Valentine	Door in the Mountain: New and Collected Poems, 1965–2003	
2005	W. S. Merwin	Migration: New and Selected Poems	
2006	Nathaniel Mackey	Splay Anthem	
2007	Robert Hass	Time and Materials: Poems, 1997–2005	
2008	Mark Doty	Fire to Fire: New and Collected Poems	
2009	Keith Waldrop	Transcendental Studies: A Trilogy	
2010	Terrance Hayes	Lighthead	
2011	Nikky Finney	Head Off & Split	
2012	David Ferry	Bewilderment: New Poems and Translations	
2013	Mary Szybist	Incarnadine	
2014	Louise Glück	Faithful and Virtuous Night	
2015	Robin Coste Lewis	Voyage of the Sable Venus	
2016	Daniel Borzutzky	The Performance of Becoming Human	
2017	Frank Bidart	Half-light: Collected Poems 1965–2016	
2018	Justin Phillip Reed	Indecency	
2019	Arthur Sze	Sight Lines	
2020	Don Mee Choi	DMZ Colony	
2021	Martín Espada	Floaters	
2022	John Keene	Punks: New & Selected Poems	
2023	Craig Santos Perez	from unincorporated territory [åmot]	
2024	Lena Khalaf Tuffaha	Something About Living	
2025	Patricia Smith	The Intentions of Thunder: New and Selected Poems	
2026	Brenda Hillman	Still House in the Desert: An eco-contemplation	

=== Young People's Literature ===
National Book Award for Young People's Literature winners, 1996 to present
Year	Author	Title	Ref.
1996	Victor Martinez	Parrot in the Oven: MiVida	
1997	Han Nolan	Dancing on the Edge	
1998	Louis Sachar	Holes	
1999	Kimberly Willis Holt	When Zachary Beaver Came to Town	
2000	Gloria Whelan	Homeless Bird	
2001	Virginia Euwer Wolff	True Believer	
2002	Nancy Farmer	The House of the Scorpion	
2003	Polly Horvath	The Canning Season	
2004	Pete Hautman	Godless	
2005	Jeanne Birdsall	The Penderwicks: A Summer Tale of Four Sisters, Two Rabbits, and a Very Interesting Boy	
2006	M. T. Anderson	The Astonishing Life of Octavian Nothing, Traitor to the Nation, Vol. I	
2007	Sherman Alexie	The Absolutely True Diary of a Part-Time Indian	
2008	Judy Blundell	What I Saw and How I Lied	
2009	Phillip Hoose	Claudette Colvin: Twice Toward Justice	
2010	Kathryn Erskine	Mockingbird	
2011	Thanhha Lai	Inside Out and Back Again	
2012	William Alexander	Goblin Secrets	
2013	Cynthia Kadohata	The Thing About Luck	
2014	Jacqueline Woodson	Brown Girl Dreaming	
2015	Neal Shusterman	Challenger Deep	
2016	John Lewis, Nate Powell, and Andrew Aydin	March: Book Three	
2017	Robin Benway	Far from the Tree	
2018	Elizabeth Acevedo	The Poet X	
2019	Martin W. Sandler	1919: The Year That Changed America	
2020	Kacen Callender	King and the Dragonflies	
2021	Malinda Lo	Last Night at the Telegraph Club	
2022	Sabaa Tahir	All My Rage	
2023	Dan Santat	A First Time for Everything	
2024	Shifa Saltagi Safadi	Kareem Between	
2025	Daniel Nayeri	The Teacher of Nomad Land	
2026	David Levithan & Gabriel Duckels	The Fight of Our Lives: AIDS in America	

=== Translation ===
National Book Award for Translation winners, 1967 to present
Year	Author	Title	Translator(s)	Ref.
1967 (Note: The first split National Book Award.)	Julio Cortázar	Hopscotch	Gregory Rabassa	
1967	Giacomo Casanova	History of My Life	Willard Trask	
1968	Søren Kierkegaard	Journals and Papers	Howard Hong and Edna Hong	
1969	Italo Calvino	Cosmicomics	William Weaver	
1970	Céline	Castle to Castle	Ralph Manheim	
1971	Bertolt Brecht	Saint Joan of the Stockyards	Frank Jones	
1971	Yasunari Kawabata	The Sound of the Mountain	Edward G. Seidensticker	
1972	Jacques Monod	Chance and Necessity	Austryn Wainhouse	
1973	Virgil	The Aeneid of Virgil	Allen Mandelbaum	
1974	Lady Nijo	The Confessions of Lady Nijo	Karen Brazell	
1974	Octavio Paz	Alternating Current	Helen R. Lane	
1974	Paul Valéry	Monsieur Teste	Jackson Matthews	
1975	Miguel de Unamuno	The Agony of Christianity and Essays on Faith	Anthony Kerrigan	
1977	Master Tung	Master Tung's Western Chamber Romance	Li-Li Ch'en	
1978	Uwe George	In the Deserts of This Earth	Richard and Clara Winston	
1979	César Vallejo	The Complete Posthumous Poetry	Clayton Eshleman and José Rubia Barcia	
1980	Cesare Pavese	Hard Labor	William Arrowsmith	
1980	Osip E. Mandelstam	Complete Critical Prose and Letters	Jane Gary Harris and Constance Link	
1981	Gustave Flaubert	The Letters of Gustave Flaubert	Francis Steegmuller	
1981	Arno Schmidt	Evening Edged in Gold	John E Woods	
1982	Higuchi Ichiyō	In the Shade of Spring Leaves	Ian Hideo Levy	
1982	Various Japanese poets	The Ten Thousand Leaves: A Translation of The Man'Yoshu, Japan's Premier Anthology of Classical Poetry	Robert Lyons Danly	
1983	Charles Baudelaire	Les Fleurs du mal	Richard Howard	
Award eliminated
2018	Tawada Yoko	The Emissary	Margaret Mitsutani	
2019	László Krasznahorkai	Baron Wenckheim's Homecoming	Ottilie Mulzet	
2020	Miri Yu	Tokyo Ueno Station	Morgan Giles	
2021	Elisa Shua Dusapin	Winter in Sokcho	Aneesa Abbass Higgins	
2022	Samanta Schweblin	Seven Empty Houses	Megan McDowell	
2023	Stênio Gardel	The Words That Remain	Bruna Dantas Lobato	
2024	Yang Shuang-zi	Taiwan Travelogue	Lin King	
2025	Gabriela Cabezón Cámara	We Are Green and Trembling	Robin Myers	
2026	Vicente Luis Mora	Centroeuropa	Rahul Bery	

== Children's books ==
National Book Award for Children's Literature winners, 1969–1979
Year	Category	Author	Title	Ref.
1969	Literature	Meindert DeJong	Journey from Peppermint Street	
1970	Literature	Isaac Bashevis Singer	A Day of Pleasure: Stories of a Boy Growing up in Warsaw	
1971	Literature	Lloyd Alexander	The Marvelous Misadventures of Sebastian	
1972	Literature	Donald Barthelme	The Slightly Irregular Fire Engine or The Hithering Thithering Djinn	
1973	Literature	Ursula K. Le Guin	The Farthest Shore	
1974	Literature	Eleanor Cameron	The Court of the Stone Children	
1975	Literature	Virginia Hamilton	M. C. Higgins the Great	
1976	Literature	Walter D. Edmonds	Bert Breen's Barn	
1977	Literature	Katherine Paterson	The Master Puppeteer	
1978	Literature	Judith Kohl and Herbert R. Kohl	The View From the Oak: The Private Worlds of Other Creatures	
1979	Literature	Katherine Paterson	The Great Gilly Hopkins	
1980	Fiction (hardcover)	Joan Blos	A Gathering of Days: A New England Girl's Journal	
1980	Fiction (paperback)	Madeleine L'Engle	A Swiftly Tilting Planet	
1981	Fiction (hardcover)	Betsy Byars	The Night Swimmers	
1981	Fiction (paperback)	Beverly Cleary	Ramona and Her Mother	
1981	Nonfiction (hardcover)	Alison Cragin Herzig and Jane Lawrence Mali	Oh, Boy! Babies	
1982	Fiction (hardcover)	Lloyd Alexander	Westmark	
1982	Nonfiction	Susan Bonners	A Penguin Year	
1982	Picture Books (hardcover)	Maurice Sendak	Outside Over There	
1982	Picture Books (paperback)	Peter Spier	Noah's Ark	
1983	Fiction (hardcover)	Jean Fritz	Homesick: My Own Story	
1983	Fiction (paperback) (Note: Split award.)	Paula Fox	A Place Apart	
1983	Fiction (paperback)	Joyce Carol Thomas	Marked by Fire	
1983	Nonfiction	James Cross Giblin	Chimney Sweeps	
1983	Picture Books (hardcover)	Barbara Cooney	Miss Rumphius	
1983	Picture Books (hardcover)	William Steig	Doctor De Soto	
1983	Picture Books (paperback)	Mary Ann Hoberman with Betty Fraser (illus.)	A House Is a House for Me	

== Nonfiction subcategories 1964 to 1983 ==
This section covers awards from 1964 to 1983 in categories that differ from the "current categories" in name. Some of them were substantially equivalent to current categories.

=== Arts and Letters ===
National Book Award for Nonfiction: Arts and Letters winners, 1964–1976
Year	Author	Title
1964	Aileen Ward	John Keats: The Making of a Poet
1965	Eleanor Clark	The Oysters of Locmariaquer
1966	Janet Flanner	Paris Journal, 1944–1965
1967	Justin Kaplan	Mr. Clemens and Mark Twain: A Biography
1968	William Troy	Selected Essays
1969	Norman Mailer	The Armies of the Night: History as a Novel, The Novel as History
1970	Lillian Hellman	An Unfinished Woman: A Memoir
1971	Francis Steegmuller	Cocteau: A Biography
1972	Charles Rosen	The Classical Style: Haydn, Mozart, Beethoven
1973	Arthur M. Wilson	Diderot
1974	Pauline Kael	Deeper into Movies
1975	Roger Shattuck	Marcel Proust
1975	Lewis Thomas	The Lives of a Cell: Notes of a Biology Watcher (Note: Lewis Thomas, The Lives of a Cell, won both the Arts and Letters and the Sciences awards in 1975.)
1976	Paul Fussell	The Great War and Modern Memory

=== History and (Auto)biography ===
National Book Award for Nonfiction: History and (Auto)biography winners, 1964–1983
Year	Category	Author	Title
1964	History and Biography	William H. McNeill	The Rise of the West: A History of the Human Community
1965	History and Biography	Louis Fischer	The Life of Lenin
1966	History and Biography	Arthur Schlesinger	A Thousand Days: John F. Kennedy in the White House
1967	History and Biography	Peter Gay	The Enlightenment: The Rise of Modern Paganism
1968	History and Biography	George F. Kennan	Memoirs: 1925–1950
1969	History and Biography	Winthrop D. Jordan	White over Black: American Attitudes Toward the Negro, 1550–1812
1970	History and Biography	T. Harry Williams	Huey Long
1971	History and Biography	James MacGregor Burns	Roosevelt: The Soldier of Freedom
1972	Biography	Joseph P. Lash	Eleanor and Franklin: The Story of Their Relationship, Based on Eleanor Roosevelt's Private Papers
1972	History	Allan Nevins	The Organized War
1973	Biography	James Thomas Flexner	George Washington, Vol. IV: Anguish and Farewell, 1793–1799
1973	History	Robert Manson Myers	The Children of Pride: A True Story of Georgia and the Civil War
1973	History	Isaiah Trunk	Judenrat: The Jewish Councils in Eastern Europe under Nazi Occupation
1974	Biography	John Clive	Thomas Babington Macaulay: The Shaping of the Historian (Note: John Clive, Thomas Babington Macaulay, won both the History and Biography awards in 1974.)
1974	Biography	Douglas Day	Malcolm Lowry: A Biography
1974	History	John Clive	Thomas Babington Macaulay: The Shaping of the Historian
1975	Biography	Richard B. Sewall	The Life of Emily Dickinson
1975	History	Bernard Bailyn	The Ordeal of Thomas Hutchinson
1976	History and Biography	David Brion Davis	The Problem of Slavery in the Age of Revolution, 1770–1823
1977	Biography and Autobiography	W. A. Swanberg	Norman Thomas: The Last Idealist
1977	History	Irving Howe	World of Our Fathers: The Journey of the East European Jews to America and the Life They Found and Made
1978	Biography and Autobiography	W. Jackson Bate	Samuel Johnson
1978	History	David McCullough	The Path Between the Seas: The Creation of the Panama Canal 1870–1914
1979	Biography and Autobiography	Arthur Schlesinger	Robert Kennedy and His Times
1979	History	Richard Beale Davis	Intellectual Life in the Colonial South, 1585–1763
1980	Autobiography (hardcover)	Lauren Bacall	Lauren Bacall by Myself
1980	Autobiography (paperback)	Malcolm Cowley	And I Worked at the Writer's Trade: Chapters of Literary History 1918–1978
1980	Biography (hardcover)	Edmund Morris	The Rise of Theodore Roosevelt
1980	Biography (paperback)	A. Scott Berg	Max Perkins: Editor of Genius
1980	History (hardcover)	Henry A. Kissinger	The White House Years
1980	History (paperback)	Barbara W. Tuchman	A Distant Mirror: The Calamitous 14th Century
1981	(Auto)biography (hardcover)	Justin Kaplan	Walt Whitman: A Life
1981	(Auto)biography (paperback)	Deirdre Bair	Samuel Beckett: A Biography
1981	History (hardcover)	John Boswell	Christianity, Social Tolerance and Homosexuality
1981	History (paperback)	Leon F. Litwack	Been in the Storm So Long: The Aftermath of Slavery
1982	(Auto)biography (hardcover)	David McCullough	Mornings on Horseback
1982	(Auto)biography (paperback)	Ronald Steel	Walter Lippmann and the American Century
1982	History (hardcover)	Peter J. Powell	People of the Sacred Mountain: A History of the Northern Cheyenne Chiefs and Warrior Societies, 1830–1879
1982	History (paperback)	Robert Wohl	The Generation of 1914
1983	(Auto)biography (hardcover)	Judith Thurman	Isak Dinesen: The Life of a Storyteller
1983	(Auto)biography (paperback)	James R. Mellow	Nathaniel Hawthorne in His Times
1983	History (hardcover)	Alan Brinkley	Voices of Protest: Huey Long, Father Coughlin and the Great Depression
1983	History (paperback)	Frank E. Manuel and Fritzie P. Manuel	Utopia in the Western World

=== Science, Philosophy and Religion ===
National Book Award for Nonfiction: Science, Philosophy, and Religion winners, 1964–1983
Year	Category	Author	Title
1964	Science, Philosophy and Religion	Christopher Tunnard and Boris Pushkarev	Man-made America: Chaos or Control?
1965	Science, Philosophy and Religion	Norbert Wiener	God and Golem, Inc: A Comment on Certain Points where Cybernetics Impinges on Religion
1966	Science, Philosophy and Religion	No Award (four finalists, none selected)	
1967	Science, Philosophy and Religion	Oscar Lewis	La Vida: A Puerto Rican Family in the Culture of Poverty—San Juan and New York
1968	Science, Philosophy and Religion	Jonathan Kozol	Death at an Early Age
1969	The Sciences	Robert Jay Lifton	Death in Life: Survivors of Hiroshima
1970	Philosophy and Religion	Erik H. Erikson	Gandhi's Truth: On the Origins of Militant Nonviolence
1971	The Sciences	Raymond Phineas Stearns	Science in the British Colonies of America
1972	Philosophy and Religion	Martin E. Marty	Righteous Empire: The Protestant Experience in America
1972	The Sciences	George L. Small	The Blue Whale
1973	Philosophy and Religion	S. E. Ahlstrom	A Religious History of the American People
1973	The Sciences	George B. Schaller	The Serengeti Lion: A Study of Predator-Prey Relations
1974	Philosophy and Religion	Maurice Natanson	Edmund Husserl: Philosopher of Infinite Tasks
1974	The Sciences	S. E. Luria	Life: The Unfinished Experiment
1975	Philosophy and Religion	Robert Nozick	Anarchy, State, and Utopia
1975	The Sciences	Silvano Arieti	Interpretation of Schizophrenia
1975	The Sciences	Lewis Thomas	The Lives of a Cell: Notes of a Biology Watcher
1980	Religion/Inspiration (hardcover)	Elaine Pagels	The Gnostic Gospels
1980	Religion/Inspiration (paperback)	Sheldon Vanauken	A Severe Mercy
1980	Science (hardcover)	Douglas Hofstadter	Gödel, Escher, Bach: An Eternal Golden Braid
1980	Science (paperback)	Gary Zukav	The Dancing Wu Li Masters: An Overview of the New Physics
1981	Science (hardcover)	Stephen Jay Gould	The Panda's Thumb: More Reflections on Natural History
1981	Science (paperback)	Lewis Thomas	The Medusa and the Snail: More Notes of a Biology Watcher
1982	Science (hardcover)	Donald C. Johanson and Maitland A. Edey	Lucy: The Beginnings of Humankind
1982	Science (paperback)	Fred Alan Wolf	Taking the Quantum Leap: The New Physics for Nonscientists
1983	Science (hardcover)	Abraham Pais	" Subtle is the Lord...": The Science and Life of Albert Einstein
1983	Science (paperback)	Philip J. Davis and Reuben Hersh	The Mathematical Experience

=== Contemporary ===
National Book Award for Nonfiction: Contemporary winners, 1972–1980
Category	Year	Author	Title
Contemporary Affairs	1972	Stewart Brand (ed.)	The Last Whole Earth Catalog
Contemporary Affairs	1973	Frances FitzGerald	Fire in the Lake: The Vietnamese and the Americans in Vietnam
Contemporary Affairs	1974	Murray Kempton	The Briar Patch: The People of the State of New York versus Lumumba Shakur, et al.
Contemporary Affairs	1975	Theodore Rosengarten	All God's Dangers: The Life of Nate Shaw
Contemporary Affairs	1976	Michael J. Arlen	Passage to Ararat
Contemporary Thought	1977	Bruno Bettelheim	The Uses of Enchantment: The Meaning and Importance of Fairy Tales
Contemporary Thought	1978	Gloria Emerson	Winners and Losers
Contemporary Thought	1979	Peter Matthiessen	The Snow Leopard (Note: Peter Matthiessen, The Snow Leopard, won the Contemporary Thought award in 1979 and the General Nonfiction, Paperback award in 1980.)
Current Interest (hardcover)	1980	Julia Child	Julia Child and More Company
Current Interest (paperback)	1980	Christopher Lasch	The Culture of Narcissism: American Life in an Age of Diminishing Expectations

=== General Nonfiction ===
National Book Award for Nonfiction: General Nonfiction winners, 1980–1983
Year	Category	Author	Title
1980	Hardcover	Tom Wolfe	The Right Stuff
1980	Paperback	Peter Matthiessen	The Snow Leopard
1981	Hardcover	Maxine Hong Kingston	China Men
1981	Paperback	Jane Kramer	The Last Cowboy: Europeans and The Politics of Memory
1982	Hardcover	Tracy Kidder	The Soul of a New Machine
1982	Paperback	Victor S. Navasky	Naming Names
1983	Hardcover	Fox Butterfield	China: Alive in the Bitter Sea
1983	Paperback	James Fallows	National Defense

== Other Fiction 1980 to 1985 ==
National Book Award for Fiction Subcategory winners, 1980–1983
Year	Category	Author	Title
1980	First Novel	William Wharton	Birdy (Note: Birdy by William Wharton, designed by Fred Marcellino, published by Alfred A. Knopf, won both the First Novel and Jacket Design awards in 1980, presumably received by Wharton and Marcellino respectively.)
1980	Mystery (hardcover)	John D. MacDonald	The Green Ripper
1980	Mystery (paperback)	William F. Buckley	Stained Glass
1980	Science Fiction (hardcover)	Frederik Pohl	Jem
1980	Science Fiction (paperback)	Walter Wangerin	The Book of the Dun Cow
1980	Western	Louis L'Amour	Bendigo Shafter
1981	First Novel	Ann Arensberg	Sister Wolf
1982	First Novel	Robb Forman Dew	Dale Loves Sophie to Death
1983	First Novel	Gloria Naylor	The Women of Brewster Place
1984	First Work of Fiction	Harriet Doerr	Stones for Ibarra
1985	First Work of Fiction	Bob Shacochis	Easy in the Islands

== Miscellaneous ==
National Book Award for Miscellaneous winners, 1980,1983
Year	Category	Author	Title
1980	General Reference Books (hardcover)	Elder Witt (ed.)	The Complete Directory
1980	General Reference Books (paperback)	Tim Brooks and Earle Marsh	The Complete Directory of Prime Time Network TV Shows: 1946–Present
1983	Original Paperback	Lisa Goldstein	The Red Magician

== 1935 to 1941 ==
The first National Book Awards were presented in May 1936 at the annual convention of the American Booksellers Association to four 1935 books selected by its members. Subsequently, the awards were announced mid-February to March 1 and presented at the convention. For 1937 books there were ballots from 319 stores, about three times as many as for 1935. There had been 600 ABA members in 1936.

The "Most Distinguished" Nonfiction, Biography, and Novel (for 1935 and 1936) were reduced to two and termed "Favorite" Nonfiction and Fiction beginning 1937. Master of ceremonies Clifton Fadiman declined to consider the Pulitzer Prizes (not yet announced in February 1938) as potential ratifications. "Unlike the Pulitzer Prize committee, the booksellers merely vote for their favorite books. They do not say it is the best book or the one that will elevate the standard of manhood or womanhood. Twenty years from now we can decide which are the masterpieces. This year we can only decide which books we enjoyed reading the most."

The Bookseller Discovery officially recognized "outstanding merit which failed to receive adequate sales and recognition" The award stood alone for 1941 and the New York Times frankly called it "a sort of consolation prize that the booksellers hope will draw attention to his work".

Authors and publishers outside the United States were eligible and there were several winners by non-U.S. authors (at least Lofts, Curie, de Saint-Exupéry, Du Maurier, and Llewellyn). The Bookseller Discovery and the general awards for fiction and non-fiction were conferred six times in seven years, the Most Original Book five times, and the biography award in the first two years only.

Dates are years of publication.

National Book Award winners, 1935–1941
Year	Category	Author	Title
1935	Biography	Vincent Sheean	Personal History
1935	Most Original Book	Charles G. Finney	The Circus of Dr. Lao
1935	Nonfiction	Anne Morrow Lindbergh	North to the Orient
1935	Novel	Rachel Field	Time Out of Mind
1936	Biography	Victor Heiser	An American Doctor's Odyssey: Adventures in Forty-Five Countries
1936	Bookseller Discovery	Norah Lofts	I Met a Gypsy
1936	Most Original Book	Della T. Lutes	The Country Kitchen
1936	Nonfiction	Van Wyck Brooks	The Flowering of New England: 1815–1865
1937	Bookseller Discovery	Lawrence Watkin	On Borrowed Time
1937	Fiction	A. J. Cronin	The Citadel
1937	Most Original Book	Carl Crow	Four Hundred Million Customers: The Experiences—Some Happy, Some Sad, of an American Living in China, and What They Taught Him
1937	Nonfiction	Ève Curie	Madame Curie
1938	Bookseller Discovery	David Fairchild	The World Was My Garden: Travels of a Plant Explorer
1938	Fiction	Daphne Du Maurier	Rebecca
1938	Most Original Book	Margaret Halsey	With Malice Toward Some
1938	Nonfiction	Anne Morrow Lindbergh	Listen! The Wind
1939	Bookseller Discovery	Elgin Groseclose	Ararat
1939	Fiction	John Steinbeck	The Grapes of Wrath
1939	Most Original Book	Dalton Trumbo	Johnny Got His Gun
1939	Nonfiction	Antoine de Saint-Exupéry	Wind, Sand and Stars
1940	Bookseller Discovery	Perry Burgess	Who Walk Alone (1942 subtitle, Life of a Leper)
1940	Fiction	Richard Llewellyn	How Green Was My Valley
1940	Nonfiction	Hans Zinsser	As I Remember Him: The Biography of R.S.
1941	Bookseller Discovery	George Sessions Perry	Hold Autumn in Your Hand

== Graphics awards ==
The "Academy Awards model" (Oscars) was introduced in 1980 under the name TABA, The American Book Awards. The program expanded from seven literary awards to 28 literary and 6 graphics awards. After 1983, with 19 literary and 8 graphics awards, the Awards practically went out of business, to be restored in 1984 with a program of three literary awards.

Since 1988 the Awards have been under the care of the National Book Foundation which does not recognize the graphics awards.

1980	Art/Illustrated collection (hardcover)	Drawings and Digressions by Larry Rivers with Carol Brightman; Herman Strobuck, designer (Clarkson N. Potter)
1980	Art/Illustrated original art (hard)	The Birthday of the Infanta by Oscar Wilde (1888 original), illustrated by Leonard Lubin (Viking Press)
1980	Art/Illustrated (paperback)	Anatomy Illustrated by Emily Blair Chewning; designed by Dana Levy (Fireside/ Simon & Schuster)
1980	Book Design (hc & ppb)	The Architect's Eye by Debora Nevins and Robert A. M. Stern (Pantheon Books)
1980	Cover Design (paper)	Famous Potatoes by Joe Cottonwood (orig. 1978); David Myers, designer (Delta/ Seymour Lawrence)
1980	Jacket Design (hard)	Birdy by William Wharton; Fred Marcellino, designer (Alfred A. Knopf)
1981	Book Design, pictorial	In China, photographed by Eve Arnold, designer R. D. Scudellari (The Brooklyn Museum)
1981	Book Design, typographical	Saul Bellow, Drumlin Woodchuck by Mark Harris, designed by Richard Hendel (University of Georgia Press)
1981	Book Illustration, collected or adapted	The Lost Museum: glimpses of vanished originals by Robert M. Adams, designed by Michael Shroyer (Viking Press)
1981	Cover Design, paperback	Fiorucci: The Book, designed by Quist-Couratin(?) (Milan: Harlin Quist Books, distributed by Dial/ Delacorte)
1981	Jacket Design, hardcover	In China, photographed by Eve Arnold, designer R. D. Scudellari (The Brooklyn Museum)
1982		
1983	Pictorial Design	Lewis Carroll's Alice in Wonderland, designer/illustrator Barry Moser, art director Steve Renick (University of California Press)
1983	Typographical Design	A Constructed Roman Alphabet, designer/illustrator David Lance Goines, art director William F. Luckey (David R. Godine)
1983	Illustration Collected Art	John Singer Sargent by Carter Ratcliff, designer Howard Morris, editor Nancy Grubb, production manager Dana Cole (Abbeville Press)
1983	Illustration Original Art	Porcupine Stew by Beverly Major, illustrator Erick Ingraham, designer/art director Cynthia Basil (William Morrow Junior Books)
1983	Illustration Photographs	Alfred Stieglitz: Photographs and Writings by Sarah Greenough and Juan Hamilton, designer Eleanor Morris Caponigro (National Gallery of Art/Callaway Editions)
1983	Cover Design	Bogmail by Patrick McGinley, illustrator Doris Ettlinger, designer/art director Neil Stuart (Penguin Books)
1983	Jacket Design	Souls on Fire by Elie Wiesel, designer Fred Marcellino, art director Frank Metz (Summit Books/ Simon & Schuster)

Herbert Mitgang's report on the inaugural TABA begins thus: "Thirty-four hardcover and paperback books, many of which nobody had heard of before, were named winners during a generally ragged presentation of the first American Book Awards in a ceremony at the Seventh Regiment Armory last night. The event was designed to resemble Hollywood's Oscars, but instead there was little glamour. All the winners were barred from accepting their awards, and most did not attend."

== Repeat winners ==
=== Books ===
At least three books have won two National Book Awards.
Dates are award years.

- John Clive
- Justin Kaplan, 1961, 1981 (Arts and Letters, Biography/Autobiography)
- George F. Kennan, 1957, 1968 (Nonfiction, History and Biography)
- Anne Morrow Lindbergh, 1936, 1939 (Non-Fiction, Non-Fiction)
- David McCullough, 1978, 1982 (History, Autobiography/Biography)
- Arthur Schlesinger, 1966, 1979 (History and Biography, Biography and Autobiography)
- Frances Steegmuller, 1971, 1981 (Arts and Letters, Translation)
- Lewis Thomas, 1975, 1981 (Arts and Letters and Science, Science)

==== "Poetry" ====
- A. R. Ammons, 1973, 1993
- Alan Dugan, 1962, 2001
- Philip Levine, 1980, 1991
- James Merrill, 1967, 1979
- Theodore Roethke, 1959, 1965
- Wallace Stevens, 1951, 1955

== Split awards ==
The Translation award was split six times during its 1967 to 1983 history, once split three ways. Twelve other awards were split, all during that period.

- 1967 Translation
- 1971 Translation
- 1972 Poetry
- 1973 Fiction, History
- 1974 Fiction, Poetry, Biography, Translation (3)
- 1975 Fiction, Arts & Letters, The Sciences
- 1980 Translation
- 1981 Translation
- 1982 Translation
- 1983 Poetry, Children's Fiction paper, Children's Picture hard

Four of the ten awards were split in 1974, including the three-way split in Translation. That year, the Awards practically went out of business. In 1975, there was no sponsor. A temporary administrator, the Committee on Awards Policy, "begged" judges not to split awards, yet three of ten awards were split. William Cole explained this in a New York Times column pessimistically entitled "The Last of the National Book Awards" but the Awards were "saved" by the National Institute of Arts and Letters in 1976.

Split awards returned with a 1980 reorganization on Academy Awards lines (under the ambiguous name "American Book Awards" for a few years). From 1980 to 1983 there were not only split awards but more than twenty award categories annually; there were graphics awards (or "non-literary awards") and dual awards for hardcover and paperback books, both unique to the period.

In 1983 the awards again went out of business, and they were not saved for 1983 publications (January to October). The 1984 reorganization prohibited split awards as it trimmed the award categories from 27 to three.

== Notes ==
Split awards

Other
