= National Book Award for Fiction =

American annual literary award

- Awarded for: Outstanding literary work by U.S. citizens.
- Location: New York City
- Country: United States
- Presented by: National Book Foundation
- First award: 1935; 91 years ago
- Website: Official website

The National Book Award for Fiction is one of five annual National Book Awards that recognize outstanding literary work by United States citizens. Since 1987, the National Book Foundation has administered and presented the awards, but they are awards "by writers to writers". The judges are five "writers who are known to be doing great work in their genre or field".

General fiction was one of four categories when the awards were reestablished in 1950. For several years beginning in 1980, there were multiple fiction categories: hardcover, paperback, first novel or first work of fiction; from 1981 to 1983 hardcover and paperback children's fiction; and in 1980 five awards for mystery fiction, science fiction, and western fiction. When the Foundation celebrated the 60th postwar awards in 2009, all but three of the 77 previous winners in fiction categories were in print. The 77 included all eight 1980 winners but excluded the 1981 to 1983 children's fiction winners.

The award recognizes one book written by a U.S. citizen and published in the U.S. from December 1 to November 30. The National Book Foundation accepts nominations from publishers until June 15, requires that nominated books be mailed to the judges by August 1, and announces five finalists in October. The winner is announced on the day of the final ceremony in November. The award is $10,000 and a bronze sculpture; other finalists get $1,000, a medal, and a citation written by the panel.

Authors who have won the award more than once include William Faulkner, John Updike, William Gaddis, Jesmyn Ward, and Philip Roth, each having won twice along with numerous other nominations. Saul Bellow won the award in 1954, 1965, and 1971, and is the only author to have won three National Book Awards for Fiction.

== National Book Awards for Fiction ==
From 1935 to 1941, there were six annual awards for general fiction and the "Bookseller Discovery" or "Most Original Book" was sometimes a novel. From 1980 to 1985, there were six annual awards to first novels or first works of fiction. In 1980 there were five awards for mystery, western, or science fiction. There have been many awards to fiction in the Children's or Young People's categories.

== Honorees, general fiction ==
This list covers only the postwar awards (pre-war awards follow) to general fiction for adult readers: one annual winner from 1950 except two undifferentiated winners 1973 to 1975, dual hardcover and paperback winners 1980 to 1983.

For each award, the winner is listed first, followed by the finalists. Unless otherwise noted, the year represents the year the award was given for books published in the previous year. Thus, the award year 1950 is for books published in 1949.

=== 1950s ===
National Book Award for Fiction winners and finalists, 1950-1959
Year	Author	Title	Result	Ref.
1950	Nelson Algren	The Man with the Golden Arm	Winner	
1950	No runners up were recognized. There were five honorable mentions in the non-fiction category only.			
1951	William Faulkner	Collected Stories of William Faulkner	Winner	
1951	Brendan Gill	The Trouble of One House	Finalist	
1952	James Jones	From Here to Eternity	Winner	
1952	James Agee	The Morning Watch	Finalist	
1952	Truman Capote	The Grass Harp	Finalist	
1952	William Faulkner	Requiem for a Nun	Finalist	
1952	Caroline Gordon	The Strange Children	Finalist	
1952	Thomas Mann	The Holy Sinner	Finalist	
1952	John P. Marquand	Melville Goodwin, USA	Finalist	
1952	J. D. Salinger	The Catcher in the Rye	Finalist	
1952	William Styron	Lie Down in Darkness	Finalist	
1952	Jessamyn West	The Witch Diggers	Finalist	
1952	Herman Wouk	The Caine Mutiny	Finalist	
1953	Ralph Ellison	Invisible Man	Winner	
1953	Isabel Bolton	Many Mansions	Finalist	
1953	H. L. Davis	Winds of Morning	Finalist	
1953	Thomas Gallagher	The Gathering Darkness	Finalist	
1953	Ernest Hemingway	The Old Man and the Sea	Finalist	
1953	Carl Jonas	Jefferson Selleck	Finalist	
1953	Peter Martin	The Landsmen	Finalist	
1953	May Sarton	A Shower of Summer Days	Finalist	
1953	Jean Stafford	The Catherine Wheel	Finalist	
1953	John Steinbeck	East of Eden	Finalist	
1953	William Carlos Williams	The Build-Up	Finalist	
1954	Saul Bellow	The Adventures of Augie March	Winner	
1954	No runners up were recognized.			
1955	William Faulkner	A Fable	Winner	
1955	Harriette Arnow	The Dollmaker	Finalist	
1955	Hamilton Basso	The View from Pompey's Head	Finalist	
1955	Davis Grubb	The Night of the Hunter	Finalist	
1955	Randall Jarrell	Pictures from an Institution	Finalist	
1955	Milton Lott	The Last Hunt	Finalist	
1955	Frederick Manfred	Lord Grizzly	Finalist	
1955	William March	The Bad Seed	Finalist	
1955	Wright Morris	The Huge Season	Finalist	
1955	Frank Rooney	The Courts of Memory	Finalist	
1955	John Steinbeck	Sweet Thursday	Finalist	
1956	John O'Hara	Ten North Frederick	Winner	
1956	Paul Bowles	The Spider's House	Finalist	
1956	Shirley Ann Grau	The Black Prince, and Other Stories	Finalist	
1956	MacKinlay Kantor	Andersonville	Finalist	
1956	Flannery O'Connor	A Good Man Is Hard to Find and Other Stories	Finalist	
1956	May Sarton	Faithful Are the Wounds	Finalist	
1956	Robert Penn Warren	Band of Angels	Finalist	
1956	Eudora Welty	The Bride of the Innisfallen and Other Stories	Finalist	
1956	Herman Wouk	Marjorie Morningstar	Finalist	
1957	Wright Morris	The Field of Vision	Winner	
1957	Nelson Algren	A Walk on the Wild Side	Finalist	
1957	James Baldwin	Giovanni's Room	Finalist	
1957	Saul Bellow	Seize the Day	Finalist	
1957	B. J. Chute	Greenwillow	Finalist	
1957	A. B. Guthrie	These Thousand Hills	Finalist	
1957	John Hersey	A Single Pebble	Finalist	
1957	John Clinton Hunt	Generations of Men	Finalist	
1957	Edwin O'Connor	The Last Hurrah	Finalist	
1957	J. F. Powers	The Presence of Grace	Finalist	
1957	Elizabeth Spencer	The Voice at the Back Door	Finalist	
1957	James Thurber	Further Fables for Our Time	Finalist	
1958	John Cheever	The Wapshot Chronicle	Winner	
1958	James Agee	A Death in the Family	Finalist	
1958	James Gould Cozzens	By Love Possessed	Finalist	
1958	Mark Harris	Something About a Soldier	Finalist	
1958	Andrew Nelson Lytle	The Velvet Horn	Finalist	
1958	Bernard Malamud	The Assistant	Finalist	
1958	Wright Morris	Love Among the Cannibals	Finalist	
1958	Vladimir Nabokov	Pnin	Finalist	
1958	Ayn Rand	Atlas Shrugged	Finalist	
1958	Nancy Wilson Ross	The Return of Lady Brace	Finalist	
1958	May Sarton	The Birth of a Grandfather	Finalist	
1959	Bernard Malamud	The Magic Barrel	Winner	
1959	J. P. Donleavy	The Ginger Man	Finalist	
1959	William Humphrey	Home from the Hill	Finalist	
1959	Vladimir Nabokov	Lolita	Finalist	
1959	John O'Hara	From the Terrace	Finalist	
1959	J. R. Salamanca	The Lost Country	Finalist	
1959	Anya Seton	The Winthrop Woman	Finalist	
1959	Robert Traver	Anatomy of a Murder	Finalist	

=== 1960s ===
National Book Award for Fiction winners and finalists, 1960-1969
Year	Author	Title	Result	Ref.
1960	Philip Roth	Goodbye, Columbus	Winner	
1960	Louis Auchincloss	Pursuit of the Prodigal	Finalist	
1960	Hamilton Basso	The Light Infantry Ball	Finalist	
1960	Saul Bellow	Henderson the Rain King	Finalist	
1960	Evan S. Connell	Mrs. Bridge	Finalist	
1960	William Faulkner	The Mansion	Finalist	
1960	Mark Harris	Wake Up, Stupid	Finalist	
1960	John Hersey	The War Lover	Finalist	
1960	H. L. Humes	Men Die	Finalist	
1960	Shirley Jackson	The Haunting of Hill House	Finalist	
1960	Elizabeth Janeway	The Third Choice	Finalist	
1960	James Jones	The Pistol	Finalist	
1960	Warren Miller	The Cool World	Finalist	
1960	James Purdy	Malcolm	Finalist	
1960	Leo Rosten	The Return of H*Y*M*A*N K*A*P*L*A*N	Finalist	
1960	John Updike	The Poorhouse Fair	Finalist	
1960	Robert Penn Warren	The Cave	Finalist	
1960	Morris West	The Devil's Advocate	Finalist	
1961	Conrad Richter	The Waters of Kronos	Winner	
1961	Louis Auchincloss	The House of Five Talents	Finalist	
1961	Kay Boyle	Generation Without Farewell	Finalist	
1961	John Hersey	The Child Buyer	Finalist	
1961	John Knowles	A Separate Peace	Finalist	
1961	Harper Lee	To Kill a Mockingbird	Finalist	
1961	Wright Morris	Ceremony in Lone Tree	Finalist	
1961	Flannery O'Connor	The Violent Bear It Away	Finalist	
1961	Elizabeth Spencer	The Light in the Piazza and Other Italian Tales	Finalist	
1961	Francis Steegmuller	The Christening Party	Finalist	
1961	John Updike	Rabbit, Run	Finalist	
1961	Mildred Walker	The Body of a Young Man	Finalist	
1962	Walker Percy	The Moviegoer	Winner	
1962	Hortense Calisher	False Entry	Finalist	
1962	George P. Elliott	Among the Dangs	Finalist	
1962	Joseph Heller	Catch-22	Finalist	
1962	Bernard Malamud	A New Life	Finalist	
1962	William Maxwell	The Chateau	Finalist	
1962	J. D. Salinger	Franny and Zooey	Finalist	
1962	Isaac Bashevis Singer	The Spinoza of Market Street and Other Stories	Finalist	
1962	Edward Lewis Wallant	The Pawnbroker	Finalist	
1962	Joan Williams	The Morning and the Evening	Finalist	
1962	Richard Yates	Revolutionary Road	Finalist	
1963	J. F. Powers	Morte d'Urban	Winner	
1963	Vladimir Nabokov	Pale Fire	Finalist	
1963	Katherine Anne Porter	Ship of Fools	Finalist	
1963	Dawn Powell	The Golden Spur	Finalist	
1963	John Updike	Pigeon Feathers and Other Stories	Finalist	
1964	John Updike	The Centaur	Winner	
1964	Bernard Malamud	Idiots First	Finalist	
1964	Mary McCarthy	The Group	Finalist	
1964	Thomas Pynchon	V.	Finalist	
1964	Harvey Swados	The Will	Finalist	
1965	Saul Bellow	Herzog	Winner	
1965	Louis Auchincloss	Rector of Justin	Finalist	
1965	John Hawkes	Second Skin	Finalist	
1965	Richard E. Kim	The Martyred	Finalist	
1965	Wallace Markfield	To an Early Grave	Finalist	
1965	Vladimir Nabokov	The Defense	Finalist	
1965	Isaac Bashevis Singer	Short Friday and Other Stories	Finalist	
1966	Katherine Anne Porter	The Collected Stories of Katherine Anne Porter	Winner	
1966	Jesse Hill Ford	The Liberation of Lord Byron Jones	Finalist	
1966	Peter Matthiessen	At Play in the Fields of the Lord	Finalist	
1966	James Merrill	The (Diblos) Notebook	Finalist	
1966	Flannery O'Connor	Everything That Rises Must Converge	Finalist	
1966	Harry Mark Petrakis	Pericles on 31st Street	Finalist	
1967	Bernard Malamud	The Fixer	Winner	
1967	Louis Auchincloss	The Embezzler	Finalist	
1967	Edwin O'Connor	All in the Family	Finalist	
1967	Walker Percy	The Last Gentleman	Finalist	
1967	Harry Mark Petrakis	A Dream of Kings	Finalist	
1967	Wilfrid Sheed	Office Politics	Finalist	
1968	Thornton Wilder	The Eighth Day	Winner	
1968	Norman Mailer	Why Are We in Vietnam?	Finalist	
1968	Joyce Carol Oates	A Garden of Earthly Delights	Finalist	
1968	Chaim Potok	The Chosen	Finalist	
1968	William Styron	The Confessions of Nat Turner	Finalist	
1969	Jerzy Kosiński	Steps	Winner	
1969	John Barth	Lost in the Funhouse	Finalist	
1969	Frederick Exley	A Fan's Notes	Finalist	
1969	Joyce Carol Oates	Expensive People	Finalist	
1969	Thomas Rogers	The Pursuit of Happiness	Finalist	

=== 1970s ===
National Book Award for Fiction winners and finalists, 1970-1979
Year	Author	Title	Result	Ref.
1970	Joyce Carol Oates	them	Winner	
1970	Leonard Gardner	Fat City	Finalist	
1970	Leonard Michaels	Going Places	Finalist	
1970	Jean Stafford	The Collected Stories of Jean Stafford	Finalist	
1970	Kurt Vonnegut	Slaughterhouse-Five	Finalist	
1971	Saul Bellow	Mr. Sammler's Planet	Winner	
1971	James Dickey	Deliverance	Finalist	
1971	Shirley Hazzard	The Bay of Noon	Finalist	
1971	John Updike	Bech: A Book	Finalist	
1971	Eudora Welty	Losing Battles	Finalist	
1972	Flannery O'Connor	The Complete Stories (Note: The Complete Stories was named the "Best of the National Book Awards" as part of the Fiction Award's 60th anniversary celebration in 2009, by internet visitors voting on a ballot of the best six award winners selected by writers associated with the Foundation.)	Winner	
1972	Frederick Buechner	Lion Country	Finalist	
1972	E. L. Doctorow	The Book of Daniel	Finalist	
1972	Stanley Elkin	The Dick Gibson Show	Finalist	
1972	Tom McHale	Farragan's Retreat	Finalist	
1972	Joyce Carol Oates	Wonderland	Finalist	
1972	Cynthia Ozick	The Pagan Rabbi and Other Stories	Finalist	
1972	Walker Percy	Love in the Ruins	Finalist	
1972	Earl Thompson	A Garden of Sand	Finalist	
1972	John Updike	Rabbit Redux	Finalist	
1973 (Note: The Fiction panels split the 1973, 1974, and 1975 awards. Split awards have been prohibited continuously from 1984.)	John Barth	Chimera	Winner	
1973	John Williams	Augustus	Winner	
1973	Brock Brower	The Late Great Creature	Finalist	
1973	Alan H. Friedman	Hermaphrodeity	Finalist	
1973	Barry Hannah	Geronimo Rex	Finalist	
1973	George V. Higgins	The Friends of Eddie Coyle	Finalist	
1973	R. M. Koster	The Prince	Finalist	
1973	Vladimir Nabokov	Transparent Things	Finalist	
1973	Ishmael Reed	Mumbo Jumbo	Finalist	
1973	Thomas Rogers	The Confessions of a Child of the Century	Finalist	
1973	Isaac Bashevis Singer	Enemies, A Love Story	Finalist	
1973	Eudora Welty	The Optimist's Daughter	Finalist	
1974	Thomas Pynchon	Gravity's Rainbow	Winner	
1974	Isaac Bashevis Singer	A Crown of Feathers and Other Stories	Winner	
1974	Doris Betts	Beasts of the Southern Wild and Other Stories	Finalist	
1974	John Cheever	The World of Apples	Finalist	
1974	Ellen Douglas	Apostles of Light	Finalist	
1974	Stanley Elkin	Searches and Seizures	Finalist	
1974	John Gardner	Nickel Mountain	Finalist	
1974	John Leonard	Black Conceit	Finalist	
1974	Thomas McGuane	Ninety-Two in the Shade	Finalist	
1974	Wilfrid Sheed	People Will Always Be Kind	Finalist	
1974	Gore Vidal	Burr	Finalist	
1974	Joy Williams	State of Grace	Finalist	
1975	Robert Stone	Dog Soldiers	Winner	
1975	Thomas Williams	The Hair of Harold Roux	Winner	
1975	Donald Barthelme	Guilty Pleasures	Finalist	
1975	Gail Godwin	The Odd Woman	Finalist	
1975	Joseph Heller	Something Happened	Finalist	
1975	Toni Morrison	Sula	Finalist	
1975	Vladimir Nabokov	Look at the Harlequins!	Finalist	
1975	Grace Paley	Enormous Changes at the Last Minute	Finalist	
1975	Philip Roth	My Life as a Man	Finalist	
1975	Mark Smith	The Death of the Detective	Finalist	
1976	William Gaddis	J R	Winner	
1976	Saul Bellow	Humboldt's Gift	Finalist	
1976	Hortense Calisher	The Collected Stories of Hortense Calisher	Finalist	
1976	Johanna Kaplan	Other People's Lives	Finalist	
1976	Vladimir Nabokov	Tyrants Destroyed and Other Stories	Finalist	
1976	Larry Woiwode	Beyond the Bedroom Wall	Finalist	
1977	Wallace Stegner	The Spectator Bird	Winner	
1977	Raymond Carver	Will You Please Be Quiet, Please?	Finalist	
1977	MacDonald Harris	The Balloonist	Finalist	
1977	Ursula K. Le Guin	Orsinian Tales	Finalist	
1977	Cynthia Propper Seton	A Fine Romance	Finalist	
1978	Mary Lee Settle	Blood Tie	Winner	
1978	Robert Coover	The Public Burning	Finalist	
1978	Peter De Vries	Madder Music	Finalist	
1978	James Alan McPherson	Elbow Room	Finalist	
1978	John Sayles	Union Dues	Finalist	
1979	Tim O'Brien	Going After Cacciato	Winner	
1979	John Cheever	The Stories of John Cheever	Finalist	
1979	John Irving	The World According to Garp	Finalist	
1979	Diane Johnson	Lying Low	Finalist	
1979	David Plante	The Family	Finalist	

=== 1980s ===
For 1980 to 1983 this list covers the paired "Fiction (hardcover)" and "Fiction (paperback)" awards in that order. Hard and paper editions were distinguished only in these four years; none of the paperback winners were original; in their first editions all had been losing finalists in 1979 or 1981.

From 1980 to 1985 there was also one award for first novel or first work of fiction and in 1980 there were five more awards for mystery, western, and science fiction. None of those are covered here.

==== 1980-1983 ====
National Book Award for Fiction winners and finalists, 1980-1983
Year	Category	Author	Title	Result	Ref.
1980	Hardcover	William Styron	Sophie's Choice	Winner	
1980	Hardcover	James Baldwin	Just Above My Head	Finalist	
1980	Hardcover	Norman Mailer	The Executioner's Song	Finalist	
1980	Hardcover	Philip Roth	The Ghost Writer	Finalist	
1980	Hardcover	Scott Spencer	Endless Love	Finalist	
1980	Paperback	John Irving	The World According to Garp	Winner	
1980	Paperback	Paul Bowles	Collected Stories	Finalist	
1980	Paperback	Gail Godwin	Violet Clay	Finalist	
1980	Paperback	John Updike	Too Far to Go	Finalist	
1980	Paperback	Marguerite Young	Miss MacIntosh, My Darling, Volumes 1 and 2	Finalist	
1981	Hardcover	Wright Morris	Plains Song	Winner	
1981	Hardcover	Shirley Hazzard	The Transit of Venus	Finalist	
1981	Hardcover	William Maxwell	So Long, See You Tomorrow	Finalist	
1981	Hardcover	Walker Percy	The Second Coming	Finalist	
1981	Hardcover	Eudora Welty	The Collected Stories of Eudora Welty	Finalist	
1981	Paperback	John Cheever	The Stories of John Cheever	Winner	
1981	Paperback	Thomas Flanagan	The Year of the French	Finalist	
1981	Paperback	Norman Mailer	The Executioner's Song	Finalist	
1981	Paperback	Scott Spencer	Endless Love	Finalist	
1981	Paperback	Herman Wouk	War and Remembrance	Finalist	
1982	Hardcover	John Updike	Rabbit is Rich	Winner	
1982	Hardcover	Mark Helprin	Ellis Island and Other Stories	Finalist	
1982	Hardcover	John Irving	The Hotel New Hampshire	Finalist	
1982	Hardcover	Robert Stone	A Flag for Sunrise	Finalist	
1982	Hardcover	William Wharton	Dad	Finalist	
1982	Paperback	William Maxwell	So Long, See You Tomorrow	Winner	
1982	Paperback	E. L. Doctorow	Loon Lake	Finalist	
1982	Paperback	Shirley Hazzard	The Transit of Venus	Finalist	
1982	Paperback	Walker Percy	The Second Coming	Finalist	
1982	Paperback	Anne Tyler	Morgan's Passing	Finalist	
1983	Hardcover	Alice Walker	The Color Purple	Winner	
1983	Hardcover	Gail Godwin	A Mother and Two Daughters	Finalist	
1983	Hardcover	Bobbie Ann Mason	Shiloh and Other Stories	Finalist	
1983	Hardcover	Paul Theroux	The Mosquito Coast	Finalist	
1983	Hardcover	Anne Tyler	Dinner at the Homesick Restaurant	Finalist	
1983	Paperback	Eudora Welty	The Collected Stories of Eudora Welty	Winner	
1983	Paperback	David Bradley	The Chaneysville Incident	Finalist	
1983	Paperback	Mary Gordon	The Company of Women	Finalist	
1983	Paperback	Marilynne Robinson	Housekeeping	Finalist	
1983	Paperback	Robert Stone	A Flag for Sunrise	Finalist	

1983 entries were published during 1982; winners in 27 categories were announced April 13 and privately celebrated April 28, 1983.

1984 entries for the "revamped" awards in three categories were published November 1983 to October 1984; eleven finalists were announced October 17. Winners were announced and celebrated November 15, 1984.

==== 1984-1989 ====
National Book Award for Fiction winners and finalists, 1984-1989
Year	Author	Title	Result	Ref.
1984	Ellen Gilchrist	Victory Over Japan	Winner	
1984	Alison Lurie	Foreign Affairs	Finalist	
1984	Philip Roth	The Anatomy Lesson	Finalist	
1985	Don DeLillo	White Noise	Winner	
1985	Ursula K. Le Guin	Always Coming Home	Finalist	
1985	Hugh Nissenson	The Tree of Life	Finalist	
1986	E. L. Doctorow	World's Fair	Winner	
1986	Norman Rush	Whites	Finalist	
1986	Peter Taylor	A Summons to Memphis	Finalist	
1987	Larry Heinemann	Paco's Story	Winner	
1987	Alice McDermott	That Night	Finalist	
1987	Toni Morrison	Beloved	Finalist	
1987	Howard Norman	The Northern Lights	Finalist	
1987	Philip Roth	The Counterlife	Finalist	
1988	Pete Dexter	Paris Trout	Winner	
1988	Don DeLillo	Libra	Finalist	
1988	Mary McGarry Morris	Vanished	Finalist	
1988	J. F. Powers	Wheat That Springeth Green	Finalist	
1988	Anne Tyler	Breathing Lessons	Finalist	
1989	John Casey	Spartina	Winner	
1989	E. L. Doctorow	Billy Bathgate	Finalist	
1989	Katherine Dunn	Geek Love	Finalist	
1989	Oscar Hijuelos	The Mambo Kings Play Songs of Love	Finalist	
1989	Amy Tan	The Joy Luck Club	Finalist	

=== 1990s ===
National Book Award for Fiction winners and finalists, 1990-1999
Year	Author	Title	Result	Ref.
1990	Charles Johnson	Middle Passage	Winner	
1990	Felipe Alfau	Chromos	Finalist	
1990	Elena Castedo	Paradise	Finalist	
1990	Jessica Hagedorn	Dogeaters	Finalist	
1990	Joyce Carol Oates	Because It Is Bitter, and Because It Is My Heart	Finalist	
1991	Norman Rush	Mating	Winner	
1991	Louis Begley	Wartime Lies	Finalist	
1991	Stephen Dixon	Frog	Finalist	
1991	Stanley Elkin	The MacGuffin	Finalist	
1991	Sandra Scofield	Beyond Deserving	Finalist	
1992	Cormac McCarthy	All the Pretty Horses	Winner	
1992	Dorothy Allison	Bastard Out of Carolina	Finalist	
1992	Cristina García	Dreaming in Cuban	Finalist	
1992	Edward P. Jones	Lost in the City	Finalist	
1992	Robert Stone	Outerbridge Reach	Finalist	
1993	E. Annie Proulx	The Shipping News	Winner	
1993	Amy Bloom	Come to Me: Stories	Finalist	
1993	Thom Jones	The Pugilist at Rest	Finalist	
1993	Richard Powers	Operation Wandering Soul	Finalist	
1993	Bob Shacochis	Swimming in the Volcano	Finalist	
1994	William Gaddis	A Frolic of His Own	Winner	
1994	Ellen Currie	Moses Supposes	Finalist	
1994	Richard Dooling	White Man's Grave	Finalist	
1994	Howard Norman	The Bird Artist	Finalist	
1994	Grace Paley	The Collected Stories	Finalist	
1995	Philip Roth	Sabbath's Theater	Winner	
1995	Madison Smartt Bell	All Souls' Rising	Finalist	
1995	Edwidge Danticat	Krik? Krak!	Finalist	
1995	Stephen Dixon	Interstate	Finalist	
1995	Rosario Ferré	The House on the Lagoon	Finalist	
1996	Andrea Barrett	Ship Fever and Other Stories	Winner	
1996	Ron Hansen	Atticus	Finalist	
1996	Elizabeth McCracken	The Giant's House	Finalist	
1996	Steven Millhauser	Martin Dressler: The Tale of an American Dreamer	Finalist	
1996	Janet Peery	The River Beyond the World	Finalist	
1997	Charles Frazier	Cold Mountain	Winner	
1997	Don DeLillo	Underworld	Finalist	
1997	Diane Johnson	Le Divorce	Finalist	
1997	Ward Just	Echo House	Finalist	
1997	Cynthia Ozick	The Puttermesser Papers	Finalist	
1998	Alice McDermott	Charming Billy	Winner	
1998	Allegra Goodman	Kaaterskill Falls	Finalist	
1998	Gayl Jones	The Healing	Finalist	
1998	Robert Stone	Damascus Gate	Finalist	
1998	Tom Wolfe	A Man in Full	Finalist	
1999	Ha Jin	Waiting	Winner	
1999	Andre Dubus III	House of Sand and Fog	Finalist	
1999	Kent Haruf	Plainsong	Finalist	
1999	Patricia Henley	Hummingbird House	Finalist	
1999	Jean Thompson	Who Do You Love	Finalist	

=== 2000s ===
National Book Award for Fiction winners and finalists, 2000-2009
Year	Author	Title	Result	Ref.
2000	Susan Sontag	In America	Winner	
2000	Charles Baxter	The Feast of Love	Finalist	
2000	Alan Lightman	The Diagnosis	Finalist	
2000	Joyce Carol Oates	Blonde	Finalist	
2000	Francine Prose	Blue Angel	Finalist	
2001	Jonathan Franzen	The Corrections	Winner	
2001	Dan Chaon	Among the Missing	Finalist	
2001	Jennifer Egan	Look at Me	Finalist	
2001	Louise Erdrich	The Last Report on the Miracles at Little No Horse	Finalist	
2001	Susan Straight	Highwire Moon	Finalist	
2002	Julia Glass	Three Junes	Winner	
2002	Mark Costello	Big If	Finalist	
2002	Adam Haslett	You Are Not a Stranger Here	Finalist	
2002	Martha McPhee	Gorgeous Lies	Finalist	
2002	Brad Watson	The Heaven of Mercury	Finalist	
2003	Shirley Hazzard	The Great Fire	Winner	
2003	T. C. Boyle	Drop City	Finalist	
2003	Edward P. Jones	The Known World	Finalist	
2003	Scott Spencer	A Ship Made of Paper	Finalist	
2003	Marianne Wiggins	Evidence of Things Unseen	Finalist	
2004	Lily Tuck	The News from Paraguay	Winner	
2004	Sarah Shun-lien Bynum	Madeleine is Sleeping	Finalist	
2004	Christine Schutt	Florida	Finalist	
2004	Joan Silber	Ideas of Heaven: A Ring of Stories	Finalist	
2004	Kate Walbert	Our Kind	Finalist	
2005	William T. Vollmann	Europe Central	Winner	
2005	E. L. Doctorow	The March	Finalist	
2005	Mary Gaitskill	Veronica	Finalist	
2005	Christopher Sorrentino	Trance	Finalist	
2005	René Steinke	Holy Skirts	Finalist	
2006	Richard Powers	The Echo Maker	Winner	
2006	Mark Z. Danielewski	Only Revolutions	Finalist	
2006	Ken Kalfus	A Disorder Peculiar to the Country	Finalist	
2006	Dana Spiotta	Eat the Document	Finalist	
2006	Jess Walter	The Zero	Finalist	
2007	Denis Johnson	Tree of Smoke	Winner	
2007	Mischa Berlinski	Fieldwork	Finalist	
2007	Lydia Davis	Varieties of Disturbance	Finalist	
2007	Joshua Ferris	Then We Came to the End	Finalist	
2007	Jim Shepard	Like You'd Understand, Anyway	Finalist	
2008	Peter Matthiessen	Shadow Country	Winner	
2008	Aleksandar Hemon	The Lazarus Project	Finalist	
2008	Rachel Kushner	Telex from Cuba	Finalist	
2008	Marilynne Robinson	Home	Finalist	
2008	Salvatore Scibona	The End	Finalist	
2009	Colum McCann	Let the Great World Spin	Winner	
2009	Bonnie Jo Campbell	American Salvage	Finalist	
2009	Daniyal Mueenuddin	In Other Rooms, Other Wonders	Finalist	
2009	Jayne Anne Phillips	Lark and Termite	Finalist	
2009	Marcel Theroux	Far North	Finalist	

=== 2010s ===
National Book Award for Fiction winners and finalists, 2010-2019
Year	Author	Title	Result	Ref.
2010	Jaimy Gordon	Lord of Misrule	Winner	
2010	Peter Carey	Parrot and Olivier in America	Finalist	
2010	Nicole Krauss	Great House	Finalist	
2010	Lionel Shriver	So Much for That	Finalist	
2010	Karen Tei Yamashita	I Hotel	Finalist	
2011	Jesmyn Ward	Salvage the Bones	Winner	
2011	Andrew Krivak	The Sojourn	Finalist	
2011	Téa Obreht	The Tiger's Wife	Finalist	
2011	Julie Otsuka	The Buddha in the Attic	Finalist	
2011	Edith Pearlman	Binocular Vision	Finalist	
2012	Louise Erdrich	The Round House	Winner	
2012	Junot Díaz	This Is How You Lose Her	Finalist	
2012	Dave Eggers	A Hologram for the King	Finalist	
2012	Ben Fountain	Billy Lynn's Long Halftime Walk	Finalist	
2012	Kevin Powers	The Yellow Birds	Finalist	
2013	James McBride	The Good Lord Bird	Winner	
2013	Rachel Kushner	The Flamethrowers	Finalist	
2013	Jhumpa Lahiri	The Lowland	Finalist	
2013	Thomas Pynchon	Bleeding Edge	Finalist	
2013	George Saunders	Tenth of December: Stories	Finalist	
2014	Phil Klay	Redeployment	Winner	
2014	Rabih Alameddine	An Unnecessary Woman	Finalist	
2014	Anthony Doerr	All the Light We Cannot See	Finalist	
2014	Emily St. John Mandel	Station Eleven	Finalist	
2014	Marilynne Robinson	Lila	Finalist	
2015	Adam Johnson	Fortune Smiles	Winner	
2015	Karen Bender	Refund	Finalist	
2015	Angela Flournoy	The Turner House	Finalist	
2015	Lauren Groff	Fates and Furies	Finalist	
2015	Hanya Yanagihara	A Little Life	Finalist	
2016	Colson Whitehead	The Underground Railroad	Winner	
2016	Chris Bachelder	The Throwback Special	Finalist	
2016	Paulette Jiles	News of the World	Finalist	
2016	Karan Mahajan	The Association of Small Bombs	Finalist	
2016	Jacqueline Woodson	Another Brooklyn	Finalist	
2017	Jesmyn Ward	Sing, Unburied, Sing	Winner	
2017	Elliot Ackerman	Dark at the Crossing	Finalist	
2017	Lisa Ko	The Leavers	Finalist	
2017	Min Jin Lee	Pachinko	Finalist	
2017	Carmen Maria Machado	Her Body and Other Parties	Finalist	
2018	Sigrid Nunez	The Friend	Winner	
2018	Jamel Brinkley	A Lucky Man	Finalist	
2018	Lauren Groff	Florida	Finalist	
2018	Brandon Hobson	Where the Dead Sit Talking	Finalist	
2018	Rebecca Makkai	The Great Believers	Finalist	
2019	Susan Choi	Trust Exercise	Winner	
2019	Kali Fajardo-Anstine	Sabrina and Corina	Finalist	
2019	Marlon James	Black Leopard, Red Wolf	Finalist	
2019	Laila Lalami	The Other Americans	Finalist	
2019	Julia Phillips	Disappearing Earth	Finalist	

=== 2020s ===
National Book Award for Fiction winners and finalists, 2020–present
Year	Author	Title	Result	Ref.
2020	Charles Yu	Interior Chinatown	Winner	
2020	Rumaan Alam	Leave the World Behind	Finalist	
2020	Lydia Millet	A Children's Bible	Finalist	
2020	Deesha Philyaw	The Secret Lives of Church Ladies	Finalist	
2020	Douglas Stuart	Shuggie Bain	Finalist	
2021	Jason Mott	Hell of a Book	Winner	
2021	Anthony Doerr	Cloud Cuckoo Land	Finalist	
2021	Lauren Groff	Matrix	Finalist	
2021	Laird Hunt	Zorrie	Finalist	
2021	Robert Jones Jr.	The Prophets	Finalist	
2022	Tess Gunty	The Rabbit Hutch	Winner	
2022	Gayl Jones	The Birdcatcher	Finalist	
2022	Jamil Jan Kochai	The Haunting of Hajji Hotak and Other Stories	Finalist	
2022	Sarah Thankam Mathews	All This Could Be Different	Finalist	
2022	Alejandro Varela	The Town of Babylon	Finalist	
2023	Justin Torres	Blackouts	Winner	
2023	Nana Kwame Adjei-Brenyah	Chain-Gang All-Stars	Finalist	
2023	Aaliyah Bilal	Temple Folk	Finalist	
2023	Paul Harding	This Other Eden	Finalist	
2023	Hanna Pylväinen	The End of Drum-Time	Finalist	
2024	Percival Everett	James	Winner	
2024	'Pemi Aguda	Ghostroots	Finalist	
2024	Kaveh Akbar	Martyr!	Finalist	
2024	Miranda July	All Fours	Finalist	
2024	Hisham Matar	My Friends	Finalist	
2025
2025	Rabih Alameddine	The True True Story of Raja the Gullible (and His Mother)	Winner	
2025	Megha Majumdar	A Guardian and a Thief	Finalist	
2025	Karen Russell	The Antidote	Finalist	
2025	Ethan Rutherford	North Sun, or, the Voyage of the Whaleship Esther	Finalist	
2025	Bryan Washington	Palaver	Finalist	
2026
2026	Hannah Lillith Assadi	Paradiso 17	Winner	
2026	Edwidge Danticat	Dèy	Finalist	
2026	Julián Delgado Lopera	Pretend You’re Dead and I Carry You	Finalist	
2026	Valeria Luiselli	Beginning Middle End	Finalist	
2026	Morgan Thomas	Mad Eden	Finalist	

== Early awards for fiction ==
The National Book Awards for 1935 to 1940 annually recognized the "Most Distinguished Novel" (1935–1936) or "Favorite Fiction" (1937–1940). Furthermore, works of fiction were eligible for the "Bookseller Discovery" and "Most Original Book" awards; fiction winners are listed here.

There was only one National Book Award for 1941, the Bookseller Discovery, which recognized the novel Hold Autumn In Your Hand by George Perry; then none until the 1950 revival in three categories including Fiction.

=== Most Distinguished Novel (1935–1936) ===
1935: Rachel Field, Time Out of Mind

1936: Margaret Mitchell, Gone With the Wind

=== Favorite Fiction (1937–1940) ===
1937: A. J. Cronin, The Citadel

- Conrad Richter, The Sea of Grass (Note: Contemporary coverage by The New York Times lists four "close seconds" for the four awards, three of which were works of fiction. The third listed was nonfiction, but Nonfiction was the second listed award winner, so the allocation of "close seconds" to award categories is uncertain.)
- Kenneth Roberts, Northwest Passage
- Leonard Q. Ross (Leo Rosten), The Education of H*Y*M*A*N K*A*P*L*A*N (short stories)

1938: Daphne Du Maurier, Rebecca

1939: John Steinbeck, The Grapes of Wrath

- Sholom Asch, The Nazarene

1940: Richard Llewellyn, How Green Was My Valley

=== Bookseller Discovery (1936–1941) ===
1936: Norah Lofts, I Met a Gypsy (short stories)

1937: Lawrence Watkin, On Borrowed Time (novel)

- see 1937 Fiction

1938: see nonfiction

1939: Elgin Groseclose, Ararat (novel)

- Chard Powers Smith, Artillery of Time, I

1940: see nonfiction

1941: George Sessions Perry, Hold Autumn in Your Hand (novel)

=== Most Original Book (1935–1939) ===
1935: Charles G. Finney, The Circus of Dr. Lao (novel)

1936: see nonfiction

1937: see nonfiction

- see 1937 Fiction

1938: see nonfiction

1939: Dalton Trumbo, Johnny Got His Gun (novel)

- Geoffrey Household, Rogue Male

== Repeat winners ==
See Winners of multiple U.S. National Book Awards
