= The River Beyond the World =

1996 novel by Janet Peery

- Author: Janet Peery
- Language: English
- Publication date: 1996

The River Beyond the World is a 1996 novel by American novelist Janet Peery. Though her debut novel, the novel was a finalist for the National Book Award for Fiction. The novel follows the relationship of two women on separate sides of the Rio Grande, in South West Texas and Mexico.
