= North Sun, or, the Voyage of the Whaleship Esther =

2025 novel by Ethan Rutherford

- Author: Ethan Rutherford
- Language: English
- Genre: Sea fiction, ecofiction
- Published: 11 March, 2025
- Publisher: A Strange Object
- Pages: 386
- ISBN: 978-1-64605-358-2
- Dewey Decimal: 813.6
- LC Class: PS3618.U7785

North Sun, or, the Voyage of the Whaleship Esther is the 2025 debut novel of author Ethan Rutherford. It was a finalist for the National Book Award for Fiction.

== Plot ==
In 1878 Massachusetts, the whaler Arnold Lovejoy is tasked with searching for a lost whaling ship and its captain, Benjamin Leander.

== Reception ==
In a starred review of North Sun, Kirkus Reviews wrote, "following a couple of well-received story collections, Rutherford makes an audacious leap as a novelist."
