= Hanna Pylväinen =

American novelist and educator

- Born: U.S.
- Citizenship: United States
- Education: Mount Holyoke College (BA); University of Michigan (MFA)
- Occupations: Novelist, educator
- Writing career
- Period: 2007 – present
- Notable works: We Sinners (2007); The End of Drum-Time (2023)

Hanna Pylväinen is an American novelist and educator. She is on the faculty at the Warren Wilson College MFA for Writers. She was formerly an assistant professor at Virginia Commonwealth University (VCU).

== Life ==
Hanna Pylväinen grew up in suburban Detroit. Her family belonged to a conservative Finnish Lutheran church, a sect called Laestadianism. Her maternal and paternal great-grandparents were from Finland.

Pylväinen attended Mount Holyoke College and received a BA in 2007, and she received a MFA from the University of Michigan. She was a postgraduate Zell Fellow, awarded by the Zell Family Foundation.

== Writing ==
Her strict religious upbringing inspired her first novel, We Sinners, which follows the individual members of a large religious family as they grapple with their faith.

Her writing has also appeared in Harper's Magazine, The New York Times, The Wall Street Journal, and elsewhere.

In 2023, her novel The End of Drum-Time was shortlisted for the National Book Award for Fiction.

== Awards and honors ==
=== Honors ===
- 2012, Whiting Award
- 2014–2015, Princeton Arts Fellow
- 2020-2021, Cullman Fellow at the New York Public Library

=== Literary awards ===
- 2023 National Book Award for Fiction finalist, The End of Drum-Time

== Work ==
- —— (2007). Unbelieving: A Memoir. Mount Holyoke College.
- —— (2012). We Sinners: A Novel. New York: Henry Holt and Company. ISBN 9780805095333.
- —— (2023). The End of Drum-Time. New York: Henry Holt and Company. ISBN 9781250822901.

=== Short work ===
- —— (March 30, 2012). "Easter Among Strangers". The New York Times Magazine (article).
