= Karen Brazell =

American professor and translator of Japanese literature (1938–2012)

Karen Brazell

Karen Brazell (April 25, 1938– January 18, 2012) was an American professor and translator of Japanese literature. Her English language edition of The Confessions of Lady Nijō won a U.S. National Book Award in category Translation. She died in 2012 at the age of 73.

== Education ==
Brazell received both her B.A. and M.A. from the University of Michigan. She later earned her PhD from Columbia University in 1969.

== Career ==
Brazell spent the bulk of her teaching career as Goldwin Smith Professor Emeritus of Japanese Literature and Theatre at Cornell University. While at Cornell, she chaired the Department of Asian Studies (1977–82) and founded the doctoral program in Japanese studies. She was director of the East Asia Program from 1987–1991. Brazell served on the Cornell Board of Trustees from 1979–1983.

Brazell was also a visiting professor at University of California-Berkeley, Columbia University, Singapore National University, the National Institute of Japanese Literature in Tokyo and the Kyoto Center for Japanese Studies.

She was founder of the Global Performing Arts Consortium and served as its first director.

== Selected publications ==
=== Books ===
- Karen Brazell (trans), The Confessions of Lady Nijo. A Zenith book, published by Arrow Books Ltd., London, 1983. ISBN 0-600-20813-3
  - This work influenced the play Top Girls, in which Lady Nijō appears as a prominent character.
- Karen Brazell (Editor), Traditional Japanese Theater: An Anthology of Plays (Translations from the Asian Classics Series), 1998. ISBN 0-231-10873-7
- Karen Brazell (Editor), Traditional Japanese Theater: An Anthology of Plays, Columbia University Press, 1999
- Karen Brazell (Editor), J. Phillip Gabriel (Editor), Monica Bethe (Translator) Twelve Plays of the Noh and Kyōgen Theatres, Columbia University Press, 1990. ISBN 9780939657001

=== Publications ===
- ""Blossoms": A Medieval Song." The Journal of Japanese Studies, vol. 6, no. 2, pp. 243–266.
- "Mori Ogai in Germany. A Translation of Fumizukai and Excerpts from Doitsu Nikki." Monumenta Nipponica, vol. 26, no. 1/2, pp. 77–100.
- "Towazugatari: Autobiography of a Kamakura Court Lady." Harvard Journal of Asiatic Studies, vol. 31, no. 3-4, pp. 220–233.
- "The Art of Renga." The Journal of Japanese Studies, vol. 2, no. 1, 1975, pp. 29–61.
- "The Changing of the Shogun 1289: An Excerpt from Towazugatari." The Journal of the Association of Teachers of Japanese, vol. 8, no. 1, 1972, pp. 58–65.

=== Book reviews ===
- "The Road to Komatsubara: A Classical Reading of the Renga Hyakuin." The Journal of Asian Studies, vol. 48, no. 2, 1989, pp. 384–386.
- "Women's Gidayū and the Japanese Theatre Tradition." The Journal of Asian Studies, vol. 58, no. 2, 1999, pp. 513–515.
- "The Poetics of Nikki Bungaku: A Comparison of the Traditions, Conventions, and Structure of Heian Japan's Literary Diaries with Western Autobiographical Writings." The Journal of Asian Studies, vol. 46, no. 2, 1987, pp. 414–415.
- "From the Country of Eight Islands: An Anthology of Japanese Poetry." The Journal of Asian Studies, vol. 42, no. 2, 1983, pp. 417–419.
- "The Tale of the Heike: Heike Monogatari." The Journal of Asian Studies, vol. 37, no. 4, 1978, pp. 755–756.
- "Miraculous Stories from the Japanese Buddhist Tradition: The Nihon Ryōiki of the Monk Kyōkai." The Journal of Asian Studies, vol. 34, no. 1, 1974, pp. 241–242.

== Affiliations ==
- Global Performing Arts Consortium (founding director)
- Japanese studies doctoral program at Cornell University

== Awards ==
- Fulbright
- National Endowment for the Humanities and Japan Foundation fellowship
- National Book Award for "The Confessions of Lady Nijo" (1983)
