= Ethan Rutherford =

American author

- Born: Seattle, Washington, U.S.
- Education: Williams College; University of Minnesota (MFA)
- Occupations: Author; Educator
- Writing career
- Period: 2013–present
- Genres: Fiction, Short story
- Notable works: The Peripatetic Coffin and Other Stories; Farthest South and Other Stories
- Notable awards: Minnesota Book Award; Friends of American Writers Prize

Ethan Rutherford is an American author who is known for his 2025 novel North Sun: Or, The Voyage of the Whaleship Esther which was a finalist for the 2025 National Book Award for Fiction.

== Biography ==
Rutherford was born in Seattle. He has a Master's of Fine Arts from the University of Minnesota and is a professor of English at Trinity College in Connecticut. His other fiction writings have appeared in literary journals Ploughshares, One Story, American Short Fiction, BOMB, Tin House, and Electric Literature.

== Career ==
Rutherford's debut book, a collection of eight short stories entitled The Peripatetic Coffin and Other Stories received the Minnesota Book Award and was a finalist for the Los Angeles Times Art Seidenbaum Award in 2013. The work was also an honorable mention for the 2014 PEN/Hemingway Award for Debut Novel in 2014. Reviewing the collection, Publishers Weekly stated that the although the author "dips into related thematic waters in nearly all of his narratives, the feeling of repetition never surfaces. These are robust, engaging stories." Reviewing the collection for The Rumpus, Lindsey Silken stated: "Rutherford has written in a sense, a modern history book—timeless depictions of the struggle of survival—and he's done it with the sort of care we reserve for tragedy victims." Silken also stated that the stories based on historical events were the most powerful in the work. His short story "The Peripatetic Coffin," which tells the story of a Confederate submarine crew's ill-fated mission during the closing stages of the American Civil War, appeared in the anthology The Best American Short Stories 2009.

North Sun tells the story of the crew of the whaling ship Esther who set sail from the American port of New Bedford, Massachusetts in 1878. The 1880s represented the waning days of the whaling industry, when many whales had been hunted to near-extinction. In addition to their usual whaling, the crew, led by captain Arnold Lovejoy, are tasked with retrieving a mysterious golden egg from another whaling captain in the Chukchi Sea named Leander, whose ship had sunk in the frigid waters. The crew uses the Northwest Passage in the arctic to travel to this golden egg. Two young boys on the Esther are protected by Old Sorrell, a half man, half bird mythical figure.

The Harvard Review stated that while North Sun has similarities to other sailing classics such as Moby Dick, the novel has achieved its own unique atmosphere and narrative. The review stated that: "Rutherford's lyrical, spare prose has a cadence like the movement of the sea."

== Works ==
- The Peripatetic Coffin and Other Stories (2013)
- Farthest South and Other Stories (2021)
- North Sun: Or, The Voyage of the Whaleship Esther (2025)
