= Peter Martin (author) =

American writer (1907–1962)

Peter Martin (1907–1962) was an American writer, known for his 1952 novel The Landsmen, which was a finalist for the National Book Award and nominated for a Pulitzer Prize.

== Novel ==
According to the Southern Illinois University Press, the novel was the first of a planned trilogy with the intention of establishing Jewish identity with the narrative. The novel is set in the 1880s in the Czarist Russian village of Golinsk. Further works would present contemporary Jewish-American life. The second entry in the trilogy, The Building was released in 1960. Martin died in 1961.

The Landsmen (which in Yiddish means people from the same place), tells the story of Jewish villagers living under the scrouge of antisemitism. Each section of the novel features a different narrator from the village, with nine narrators in all. Some characters emigrated to the United States, other stayed in Golinsk to live their lives. Writing in The New York Times, Anzia Yezierska stated: "It seems incredible that the author, up to now a journeyman in radio and television fields, should have produced a novel with this fresh weave of allegory, romance, bitter humor and folk wit." Yezierska compared the work favorably to that of Budd Schulberg or Jerome Weidman. Kirkus gave the novel a mixed review. Regarding the theme, in which the Jewish characters fought to keep their identity intact against the persecution and forced assimilation from the Czarist oppressors, Kirkus stated: "But the theme is not one that will appeal to a wide circle of non-Jewish readers, and despite a possible critical acclaim, we question its saleability."

Martin based the characters of The Landsmen from stories told to him from his grandmother and other elders about the old country when he was a boy in Brooklyn.
