= Elena Castedo =

Spanish-American author

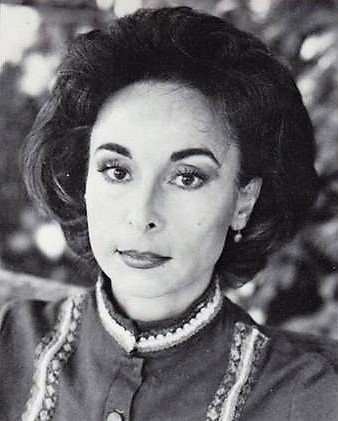
- Castedo, from her novel Paradise, 1990
- Born: Elena Castedo Magaña; 1937 (age 88–89); Barcelona, Spain
- Education: Pontifical Catholic University of Chile, University of California at Los Angeles, Harvard University
- Occupations: Writer, educator
- Spouses: Dalton Wooding (m. 1958; died in 1965) A. Denny Ellerman (m. 1973)
- Website: elenacastedo.com

Elena Castedo or Elena Castedo-Ellerman (born 1937) is an American and Spanish author and educator who writes in both Spanish and English. Her novel Paradise (1990) was a finalist for the National Book Award for Fiction. Her subsequent self-translation of the work into Spanish, as El paraíso (1990), was named by El Mercurio as the Chilean Book of the Year, was a best-seller for five months in Spain, and was nominated for the Miguel de Cervantes Prize. Her short stories Troopers (1986) and The White Bedspread (1991) each won a Phoebe Prize from George Mason University. Bedspread also was selected as the winner of the PEN International short story contest.

== Early life and education ==
Elena Castedo Magaña was born in 1937 in Barcelona to Elvira Magaña Cuadrado and Leopoldo Castedo Hernández de Padilla, during an air raid in the Spanish Civil War. At the time of her birth, her parents were students. Later, her mother became a linguist and her father was an art historian. Forced to flee to France a year later upon the fall of the Spanish Republic, her parents quickly realized that the country was likely to fall to Nazi Germany. They left France with 2,200 other refugees in August 1939, aboard a rented cargo ship, the SS Winnipeg, a venture arranged by the Chilean Government through poet Pablo Neruda, with help from the Spanish Republic-in-exile, among others. After being refused entry to Panama, the boat arrived in Chile where they were allowed to land. Her family moved frequently during her youth and though she was given books to read she did not attend school until after the fourth grade. In 1958, after completing one year of secondary schooling, she toured the United States with a group of Chilean students and was featured in newspaper articles comparing her beauty to that of Ingrid Bergman, Audrey Hepburn, and Sophia Loren.

That year in Reno, Nevada, Castedo married Dalton Wooding, with whom she had two children. The family moved often, living in the metropolitan areas of Los Angeles and Sacramento, until the couple separated in 1965. After Wooding's suicide that year, she moved to Connecticut to live near her sister. With very little income and lacking education, she worked as an appliance demonstrator, day-care attendant, door-to-door saleswoman, model, and Spanish tutor, before deciding to return to Chile to complete her education. She attended an accelerated program at the Pontifical Catholic University of Chile and in 1966 earned a teaching degree. Simultaneously with her studies, she was employed as a social worker and after her graduation taught at the English College and Nascimiento Institute of Santiago for a year.

Able to earn a scholarship because of her high scholastic marks, Castedo enrolled at the University of California at Los Angeles, graduating with a master's degree in Spanish-American literature in 1968. She was accepted as a teacher's assistant in the literature department at Harvard University and granted a scholarship to study for her PhD. While there, she met A. Denny Ellerman, a graduate student in the Economics Department, who later became an economist at MIT. They married in Aix-en-Provence in 1973. The family moved to Vietnam, where Ellerman served as the Minister Counselor of Economic Affairs at the American Embassy. Castedo and her children were evacuated days before the Fall of Saigon and made their way to Hong Kong. While living in various Asian countries she continued to work on her doctoral thesis and earned her PhD from Harvard in 1976.

== Writing career ==
Throughout 1977, Castedo lectured at American University and then became the editor-in-chief at the journal, Revista Interamericana de Bibliografia/Inter-American Review of Bibliography, published by the Organization of American States. Between 1980 and 1985 she worked as a cultural affairs consultant and began publishing poetry. In 1986, her short story "Troopers" received a Phoebe Prize for best fiction from George Mason University. In 1990 she published her first full-length novel, simultaneously as Paradise in English and El paraíso in Spanish. The semi-autobiographical work won critical acclaim and "became the first novel written in Spanish and another language to win major nominations or prizes in both languages, in different countries". In the United States, it was nominated for a National Book Award for Fiction, placing as a finalist. The Spanish version spent five months as a number one best-seller in Spain and was nominated for the Miguel de Cervantes Prize. It was also named Book of the Year by the leading Chilean newspaper El Mercurio.

In 1991, Castedo's short story "The White Bedspread" won the PEN International short story contest and earned her a second Phoebe Award. Her articles, poems and short stories have appeared in various publications, including African American Review, Americas, Amthropo's, Hispamerica and Phoebe. In addition, she has been a visiting lecturer, writer, and instructor for literary workshops throughout the country.

== Selected works ==
- Castedo, Elena (1990). Paradise: A Novel. New York, New York: Grove Weidenfeld. ISBN 978-1-55584-279-6. Simultaneously published in Spanish as El paraíso by Ediciones Barcelona.
- Castedo, Elena (1992). "The White Bedspread". In Poey, Delia (ed.). Iguana Dreams: New Latino Fiction. New York, New York: HarperCollins. pp. 26–32. ISBN 978-0-06-096917-2. OCLC 715712852.
- Castedo, Elena (1996). "Ice Cream". In Poey, Delia (ed.). Out of the Mirrored Garden: New Fiction by Latin American Women. New York, New York: Anchor Books. ISBN 978-0-385-47594-5.
- Castedo, Elena (1998). "Watercress". In Winegardner, Mark (ed.). We Are What We Ate: 24 Memories of Food. New York, New York: Harcourt Brace. ISBN 978-0-15-600623-1.
- Castedo, Elena (2009). "A Love Story". In Elstein, Judith; Tenebaum, Frances (eds.). Cambridge Voices: A Literary Celebration of Libraries and the Joy of Reading. Cambridge, Massachusetts: Friends of the Cambridge Public Library. ISBN 978-0-9749171-1-5.
