= Paradiso 17 =

2026 novel by Hannah Lillith Assadi

- Author: Hannah Lillith Assadi
- Genre: Literary fiction
- Publisher: Knopf
- Publication date: March 17, 2026
- Pages: 320
- ISBN: 978-0593804056

Paradiso 17 is a 2026 novel by Hannah Lillith Assadi. Following the life of a Palestinian forced to leave Palestine during the Nakba and his subsequent struggle to establish a home in various parts of the world, it won the 2026 National Book Award for Fiction.

== Critical reception ==
The New York Times called the novel lyrical and tender, while "easy answers" and instead after "something slower: the way history settles into you, day by day" and "the cost of inheriting and failing to mend a broken world."

Washington Independent Review of Books concluded that "Assadi's insights into the complexities of Palestinian life are unique, and her novel is a triumph both from a literary and a socio-historic perspective."

Alta Journal recommended: "As a corrective to the fiction of moral convenience, read Assadi’s wistful and elegiac novel, brimming with contradictions and heartache yet rife with the unquenchable desire to find oneself safely at home."
