= The End of Drum-Time =

2024 novel by Hanna Pylväinen

- Author: Hanna Pylväinen
- Language: English
- Genre: Historical Fiction
- Publisher: Henry Holt and Company
- Publication date: 2023
- Publication place: United States
- Pages: 368
- ISBN: 9781250822901

The End of Drum-Time is a 2023 novel by Hanna Pylväinen published by Henry Holt and Company, an imprint of Macmillan Publishers. The novel takes place in the tundra of 1850s Sweden. It tells of Willa, the daughter of Lutheran preacher Mad Lasse (based on the historical Lars Levi Laestadius), who falls in love with Ivvár, one of the young Sámi peoples she meets at her father's mission outpost. The Sámi peoples are reindeer herders, whose livelihoods and economy is closely linked to the reindeer. When they prepare to leave Lasse's outpost to travel with the reindeer migration north, Willa chooses to travel with them and Ivvár, joining their society.

To research the novel, Pylväinen lived with a Sámi tribe in Finland for six months.

The novel was a finalist for the 2023 National Book Award for Fiction, with the judges stating the novel's prose vividly transports the reader to 1850s Scandinavia and the themes explored-including identify, faith, and race-are urgently relevant to our contemporary lives.

== Reception ==
Writing for The Guardian, Erica Wagner compared the novel to the writings of Thomas Hardy, stating that the work provided a delicate, empathetic portrait of a group of people who were trying to preserve their traditions and way of life amidst crushing outside pressures. The novel was named one of the best books of 2023 by Vox. The novel was one of Time's must read books of 2023, with the reviewer stating the work was an extensively researched story about two cultures colliding.
