= Rob Magnuson Smith =

British-American novelist

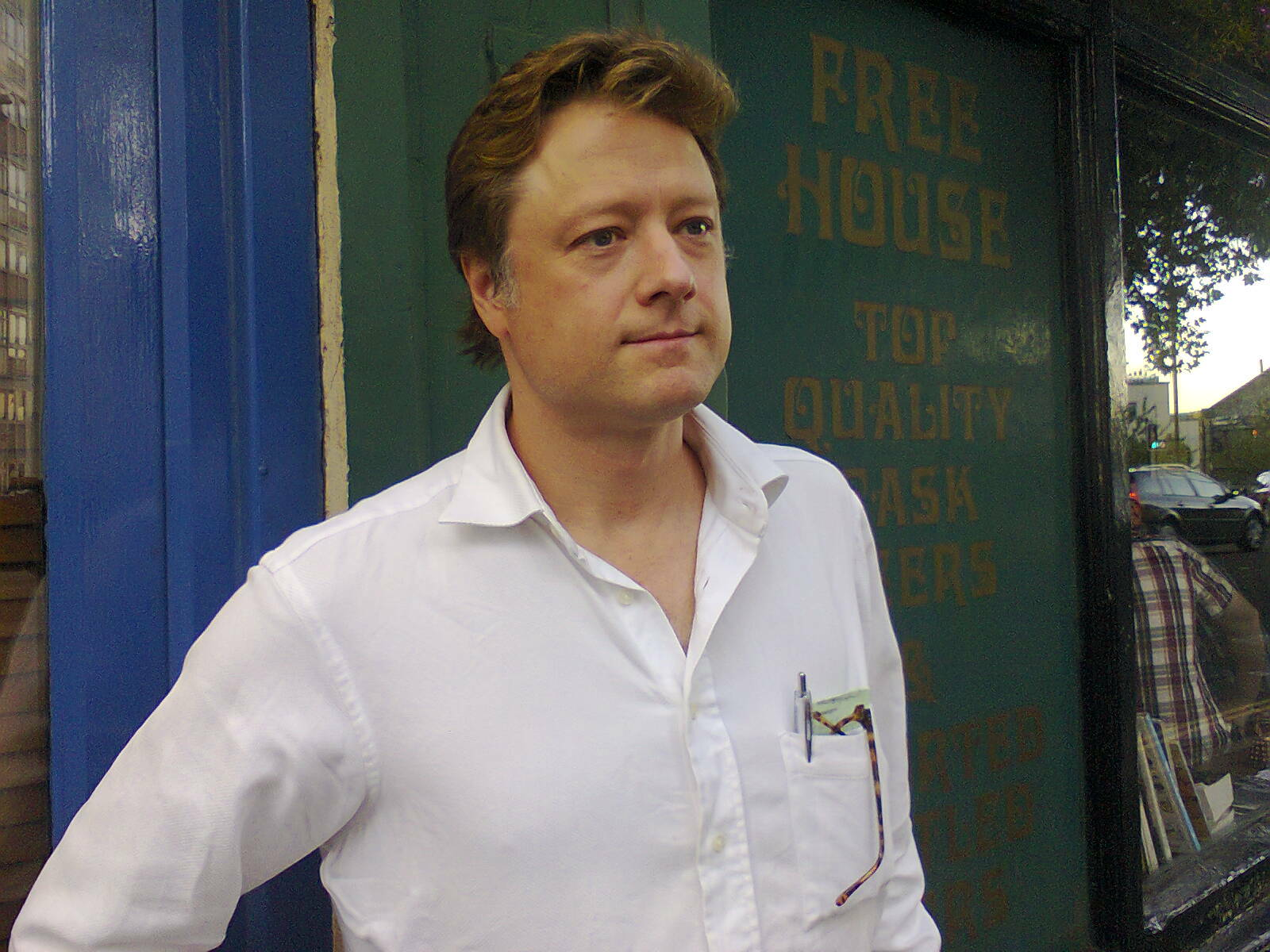
Rob Smith

Rob Magnuson Smith is a novelist, short story writer, journalist, and university lecturer. A dual citizen of the United States and the United Kingdom, Smith currently resides in Cornwall.

He has a BA in philosophy and a BA in psychology from Pitzer College, an MA in creative writing from the University of East Anglia, where he won the David Higham Award, and a PhD in creative writing from Bath Spa University. Since September 2013, he has taught English and Creative Writing for the University of Exeter.

== Works ==
=== Novels ===
His first novel, The Gravedigger, is the story of painfully shy gravedigger Henry Bale, who falls in love with the bright, energetic, new schoolteacher, whose sudden arrival awakens and upsets his quiet life and his quiet town. The Gravedigger won the gold medal in the William Faulkner – William Wisdom Creative Writing Competition.

Contest judge Andre Bernard said of the book, "To my mind there was one clear standout. In terms of characterization, plot, unusual fictional universe-making and sheer ability to create The Gravedigger wins hands-down."

His second novel, Scorper, is a critically acclaimed, darkly comic tale of an emotionally unstable American who travels to Ditchling, Sussex, in an attempt to connect with his ancestral heritage, one that intertwines with the life and legacy of famed English artisan Eric Gill, a version of whom appears in the novel.

The Independent called Scorper 'An odd, original, darkly comic novel... a funny, unsettling read; Kafka crossed with Flann O'Brien,' and gave it four stars. The Guardian called Scorper a "funny, disturbing portrayal of a mind at odds with itself."

His third novel Seaweed Rising is published by Sandstone Press and appears in August 2023.

=== Short fiction ===
Smith has published numerous short stories in publications ranging from The Guardian to The Literarian.

Most notably, in 2015, he became the first international author to win the Australian Book Review’s Elizabeth Jolley Short Story Prize, for "The Elector of Nossnearly." The story was also longlisted for the Sunday Times EFG Private Bank Short Story Award, possibly the most lucrative short story prize in the world.

=== Creative non-fiction ===
Smith's non-fiction has appeared in Granta and The Guardian among others, and he is a regular contributing editor for Playboy, with whom he has published investigative articles on Soviet-era primate hybridization experiments, the scientific search for alien life, and the San Francisco Bay Area book repository associated with the Internet Archive.

== Bibliography ==
=== Novels ===
- The Gravedigger. New Orleans: UNO Press, 2010. ISBN 978-1608010103
- Scorper. London: Granta, 2015. ISBN 978-1783781065

=== Short fiction ===
Smith's short fiction is not limited to but includes the following:

"The Elector of Nossnearly" (The Sunday Times, 2015)

"Kettleman Point" (The Clearing, 2015)

"The Headhunter's Trumpet" (Poor Yorick, 2014)

"Inkberrow" (The Literarian, 2013)

"Second Skull" (The Guardian)

=== Creative non-fiction ===
Smith's creative non-fiction is not limited to but includes the following:

"The Best Book of 1901: The Octopus" (Granta, 2015)

"An English Village Needs its Pub" (The Guardian, 2015)

"Brewster's Ark" (Playboy Magazine, 2013)

"Beyond the Sky" (Playboy Magazine, 2012)

"Beckett Catches Buster" (Projector Magazine)

== Awards and nominations ==
Smith's awards and nominations are not limited to but include the following:

2015 First Prize, Australian Book Review Elizabeth Jolley Short Story Award

2015 Longlist, The Sunday Times EFG Short Story Prize

2010-13 International Doctoral Research Fellow, Bath Spa University

2009-10 David Higham Award in Creative Writing, University of East Anglia

2004 Pirate's Alley William Faulkner Gold Medal, Best Novel, The Gravedigger
