= William Faulkner – William Wisdom Creative Writing Competition =

American literary competition

The William Faulkner – William Wisdom Creative Writing Competition is one of America's leading literary competitions and has been presenting awards in fiction, nonfiction and poetry since 1993. The competition is named after the Faulkner Society’s namesake, novelist William Faulkner, and William Wisdom of New Orleans, a literary scholar known for his collection of William Faulkner memorabilia. The event is sponsored by the Pirate's Alley Faulkner Society of New Orleans. The contest draws celebrity literary judges, and regular participants have included John Biguenet, Stuart Dybek and Bret Lott.

The award has been instrumental in launching the careers of many emerging writers, including Moira Crone, Julia Glass, Jacob M. Appel, Lynn Stegner, and Rob Magnuson Smith.

== Recent winners ==
Recent prize winners include:

2014 Winners

- Novel: Kitchens of the Great Midwest, J. Ryan Stradal, Los Angeles
- Narrative Non-Fiction Book: Shakespeare’s Royal Bastard, Lawrence Wells, Oxford, Mississippi
- Novella: Give Me You, Kay Sloan, Cincinnati
- Novel in Progress: All of the Lights, Maurice Carlos Ruffin, New Orleans

2013 Winners

- Novel: The Ambassador’s Wife Jennifer Steil, La Paz, Bolivia
- Narrative Non-Fiction Book: Paradise Misplaced (Published under Beginner’s Guide to Paradise) Alex Sheshunoff, Ojai, California
- Novella: The Amazing Mr. Morality Jacob Appel, New York City
- Novel in Progress: Trespass Sharon Thatcher, Boise, Idaho

== See also ==
- List of American literary awards
- List of literary awards
