= The Waters of Kronos =

1960 novel by Conrad Richter

First US edition

The Waters of Kronos is a novel by American author Conrad Richter published by Alfred A. Knopf in 1960. It won the National Book Award for Fiction in 1961.

According to Penn State University, "this is the story of John Donner, an aging writer who has driven from the West Coast back to Unionville, Pennsylvania, where he grew up. He discovers that the town he once knew has been submerged under the Kronos River because of a dam created to supply power for a hydroelectric plant. After viewing where the residents of the town cemeteries have been relocated, Donner finds himself on a road that went through Unionville to coal mines, where he improbably sees a wagon carrying coal and seemingly rides this wagon into the past. Once there, he finds it is the night before his grandfather's funeral, and although he knows the town and its inhabitants, they do not know him."

Richter describes the town and its inhabitants in sensual detail:

"The silent shadows of toads hopped in the garden. Occasional townspeople would pass on the street, the girls in light summer dresses, and all the time the drift of voices from front porches where families sat with occasional words between them or to those passing and pausing to chat and tell some news, so that by the time one went from Mill to Maple Street a social evening could be passed."

Tension builds as Donner longs for his family to know and love him while they show him only distant, courteous hospitality.

== Contents ==
The novel is divided into eight chapters:

- Chapter One: The River
- Chapter Two: Silt
- Chapter Three: The Chasm
- Chapter Four: Rust
- Chapter Five: The Breeding Marsh
- Chapter Six: The Source
- Chapter Seven: The Confluence
- Chapter Eight: The Sea
