= A Crown of Feathers and Other Stories =

Short stories by Isaac Bashevis Singer

First English-language edition publ. Farrar Straus & Giroux

A Crown of Feathers and Other Stories is a 1973 book of short stories written by Isaac Bashevis Singer. It shared the 1974 National Book Award for Fiction with Gravity's Rainbow by Thomas Pynchon. The twenty-four stories in this collection were translated from Yiddish by Singer, Laurie Colwin, and others.

== Contents ==
The stories appear in the following sequence:

- "A Crown of Feathers"
- "A Day in Coney Island"
- "The Captive"
- "The Blizzard"
- "Property"
- "The Lantuch"
- "The Son from America"
- "The Briefcase"
- "The Cabalist of East Broadway"
- "The Bishop's Robe"
- "A Quotation from Klopstock"
- "The Magazine"
- "Lost"
- "The Prodigy"
- "The Third One"
- "The Recluse"
- "A Dance and a Hop"
- "Her Son"
- "The Egotist"
- "The Beard"
- "The Dance"
- "On a Wagon"
- "Neighbors"
- "Grandfather and Grandson"

== Reception ==
Alfred Kazin noted in his 1974 review of the book in The New York Times that: "Isaac Bashevis Singer is an extraordinary writer. And this new collection of stories, like so much that he writes, represents the most delicate imaginative splendor, wit, mischief and, not least, the now unbelievable life that Jews once lived in Poland."
