= Janet Peery =

American short story writer and novelist

- Born: July 18, 1948 (age 78); Wichita, Kansas, U.S.
- Education: Wichita State University (BA, MFA)
- Writing career
- Genres: Short story; novel
- Notable awards: Whiting Award 1993 Fiction; Guggenheim Fellowship 1998 Fiction

Janet Peery (born July 18, 1948, in Wichita, Kansas) is an American short story writer and novelist.

== Life ==
Before she took up writing fiction in her forties, Janet Peery worked at a series of odd jobs, including waiting tables, fast food counter work, lifeguarding and teaching swimming, as a speech therapist, a hospital respiratory technician, and an insurance physical technician. After her three children were in school, she entered a graduate program and since then has published short stories in literary journals including Shenandoah, The Kenyon Review, Quarterly West, Black Warrior Review, 64 Magazine, Blackbird, Southern Review, Image: Art* Faith* Mystery, Chattahoochee Review, Oklahoma Today, Kansas Quarterly, New Virginia Review, Blackbird, American Short Fiction, StoryQuarterly, Idaho Review, Southwest Review, and others. She has won the Seaton Award from Kansas Quarterly, the Jeanne Charpiot Goodheart Prize from Washington and Lee University (twice), two Pushcart Prizes and inclusion in The Best of the Pushcart Prize, StoryQuarterly's Fiction Prize, Idaho Review's Editor's Prize, selection for Best American Short Stories 1993 (ed. Louise Erdrich), and six citations for 100 Distinguished Stories from Best American Short Stories. Her novel The River Beyond the World was a finalist for the National Book Award in 1996. What the Thunder Said, a novella and stories, won the Library of Virginia Literary Award for Fiction in 2008 and the 2008 WILLA Award from Women Writing the West for Contemporary Fiction. Her novel The Exact Nature of Our Wrongs will be published in 2017.

She taught at Old Dominion University in Norfolk, Virginia, where she was awarded the honorific University Professor and was the recipient of the Outstanding Faculty Award from the State Council of Higher Education in Virginia. She has given readings at many American colleges and universities, has taught at Warren Wilson M.F.A. Program for Writers, Antioch University LA, Sweet Briar College, Glen Workshop at Ghost Ranch, New Mexico, Sewanee Writers Conference and other conferences. She has served as Writer in Residence for the National Book Foundation's American Voices Project on the Rosebud Reservation in Mission, South Dakota and Rocky Boy's Reservation in Montana.

Peery has a B.A. degree in Speech Pathology and Audiology and a M.F.A. in creative writing from Wichita State University.

== Awards ==
- 1992 National Endowment for the Arts Fellowship
- 1993 Whiting Award in Fiction
- 1994 Richard and Hinda Rosenthal Award from the American Academy of Arts and Letters
- 1996 National Book Award Finalist
- 1998 Guggenheim Fellowship in Fiction
- 2008 Library of Virginia Literary Award for Fiction
- 2008 WILLA Award for Contemporary Fiction from Women Writing the West

== Bibliography ==
- Alligator Dance. Southern Methodist University Press. 1993. ISBN 0-87074-353-8.
- The River Beyond the World. Picador/St. Martin's. 1996. ISBN 978-0-312-16986-2.
- What the Thunder Said. Picador/St. Martin's. 2007. ISBN 978-0-312-25263-2.
- The Exact Nature of Our Wrongs. St. Martin's. 2017. ISBN 978-1-250-12508-8.

=== Anthologies ===
- Louise Erdrich; Katrina Kenison, eds. (1993). "What the Thunder Said". The Best American Short Stories 1993. Houghton Mifflin.
- Bill Henderson, ed. (2008). "Nosotros". The Pushcart Book of Short Stories: The Best Short Stories from the Pushcart Prize. Pushcart Press. ISBN 978-1-888889-28-4.
