= Della T. Lutes =

Cookbook author

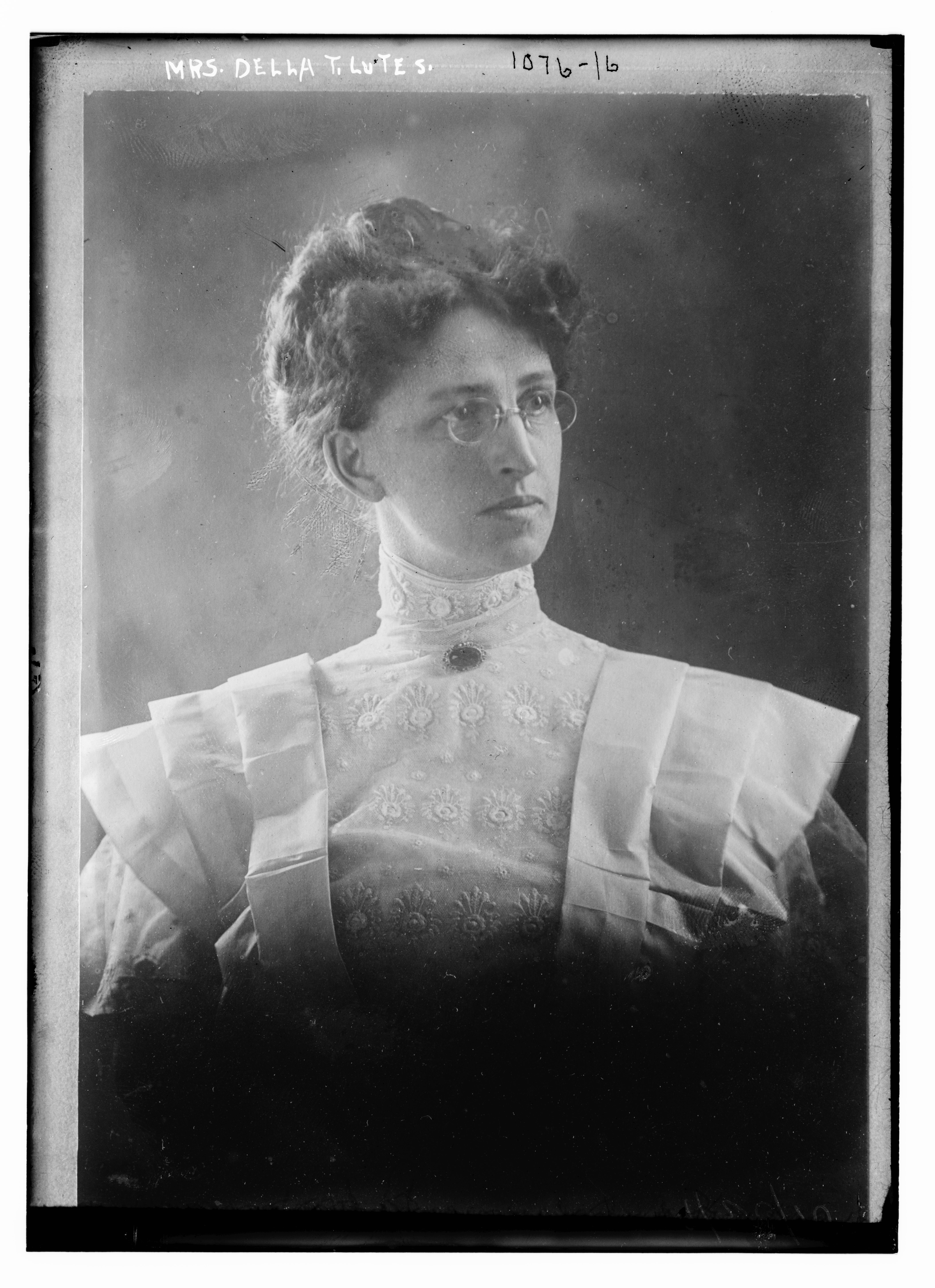
Mrs. Della T. Lutes

Della Thompson Lutes (born September, 1867 in Summit Township, Jackson County, Michigan; died Cooperstown, New York, July 13, 1942) was an American writer, editor, and expert on cooking and housekeeping. Her 1936 memoir and cookbook The Country Kitchen won a National Book Award for Nonfiction.

== Life ==
Della T. Lutes was born Della Thompson on a farm outside of Jackson, Michigan to Elijah and Almira Thompson. She graduated from a high school in Jackson at age 16 and became a teacher, first in Jackson and then in Detroit public schools. She married Louis I. Lutes (1871-1921) on July 6, 1893; they had two sons, Ralph (1894-1901) and Robert (1897-1943). Her first paid publication was in the Detroit Free Press. In 1906 her first book Just Away: A Story of Hope attracted interest due to the recent accidental shooting death of her son Ralph. By 1910 the family had moved to central New York state, living in Utica and Ilion, and Lutes joined the staff of American Motherhood, a magazine founded by Dr. Mary Wood-Allen and published in nearby Cooperstown. From 1908 to 1919 she was the editor of American Motherhood; in 1919 she moved to Today's Housewife, another magazine from the same publisher, Arthur Crist. In 1917 she was also the editor of Table Talk - The National Food Magazine, another Crist magazine.

In 1924 Lutes became the housekeeping editor of Modern Priscilla, a Boston-based women's housekeeping magazine, and director of their "Proving Plant", an early testing facility for housekeeping products. She continued there until the organization ceased to operate in 1930 due to the Depression. After this time Lutes concentrated on her writing and achieved success starting around 1935, initially combining her expertise in cookbooks and recipes with her memories of her Michigan childhood in a series of popular essays collected in The Country Kitchen (1936), which won a National Book Award for "Most Original Work".

Lutes had many articles and stories published in a variety of magazines, including Vogue, Woman's Day, Farm Journal, American Mercury, Gourmet, and others, and a historical article on dime novelist (and Cooperstown resident) Erastus Beadle published in New York History.

Lutes died of a heart attack in 1942, shortly after finishing her final memoir, Cousin William. She was buried not far from her childhood home in Jackson, Michigan, specifically in the Thompson family plot in Horton Cemetery (Horton, MI, about 7 miles southeast of Concord, MI).

== Appreciations ==
In a promotional blurb published on the dust jacket of one of her own books, L. M. Montgomery wrote of Lutes' The Country Kitchen, "I seemed on every page to be living over again my own childhood in that old P.E. Island kitchen I remember so well. The book is so full of delightful humor and characters. Its people are alive. I've put it away on my 'special bookshelf' where I keep all the books I really love."

Lawrence Dawson wrote in 1981 that "Mrs. Lutes's writing was 'unusual' because she wrote with respect about American 'country folk' when it was still not the respectable thing to do", that "she had an unusual sense for the uniquely characteristic detail", and that she had an unusual ear for dialect.

The "Della T. Lutes School" in Waterford, Michigan was dedicated in 1961 and closed in 2005; it is now the Lutes Campus of New Gateways, Inc., a non-profit which serves the mentally and developmentally disabled.

== Books ==
Just Away: A Story of Hope (1906); Child, Home, and School (1911); Bible Stories from the Old Testament (1911); The Story of Life for Children (1914); My Boy in Khaki: A Mother's Story (book for infants; 1918); The Gracious Hostess: A Book of Etiquette (1923); Modern Priscilla Cook Book: One Thousand Recipes Tested and Proved at the Priscilla Proving Plant (1924); A Home of Your Own (1925); Table Setting and Service for Mistress and Maid (1928); Bridge Food for Bridge Fans (1932); The Country Kitchen (memoir/cookbook, 1936); A Book of Menus with Recipes (1936); Home Grown (memoir, 1936); Millbrook (memoir, 1938); Gabriel's Search (memoir, 1940); Country Schoolma'am (memoir, 1941), Cousin William (memoir, 1942). She also wrote "The Presto Book of Menus & Recipes", a short recipe book distributed in the 1930s by the Cupples Corporation, distributors of Presto canning products.
