= Bob Shacochis =

American novelist

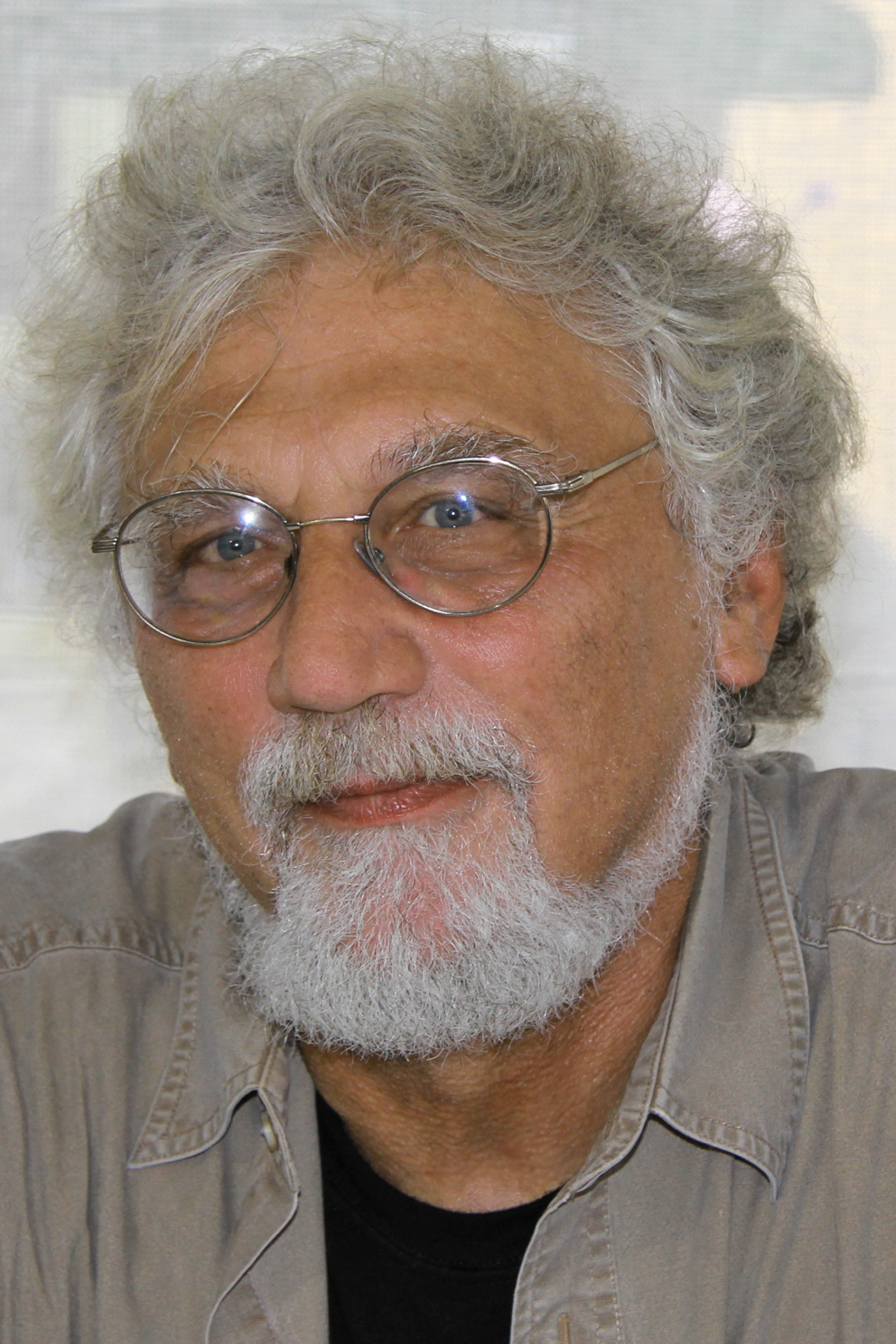
- Bob Shacochis at the 2013 Texas Book Festival.
- Born: September 9, 1951 (age 74) Pittston, Pennsylvania, U.S.
- Occupation: Professor
- Education: University of Missouri (BA); University of Iowa (MFA)
- Genre: novel; journalism

Bob Shacochis (born September 9, 1951) is an American novelist, short story writer, and literary journalist. He teaches creative writing at Florida State University.

== Writing career ==
Shacochis was born in Pennsylvania, but grew up in the Washington, D.C. suburb of McLean, Virginia. He was educated at the University of Missouri and the Iowa Writers' Workshop at the University of Iowa, and currently teaches creative writing at Florida State University. His first short-story collection, Easy in the Islands, was published in 1985 and received the National Book Award in category First Work of Fiction. The stories are set in various Caribbean locales and reflect the author's experiences as a Peace Corps volunteer in the Grenadines. His second story collection, The Next New World, widens the author's milieu, containing stories set in Florida and the islands of the Caribbean but also in Northern Virginia and the mid-Atlantic coast. In 1993, Shacochis published his first novel, Swimming in the Volcano, which was a finalist for the National Book Award. Heavily concerned with politics, elaborate in style and description, and immersed in descriptions of nature and outdoor pursuits, his fiction reflects the influence of Joseph Conrad, Graham Greene, J.P. Donleavy, and especially Ernest Hemingway. His second novel, The Woman Who Lost Her Soul, was published in 2013. It won the 2014 Dayton Literary Peace Prize for Fiction.

== Journalism ==
Shacochis has also worked as a journalist and war correspondent. A longtime culinary aficionado, Shacochis served as a cooking columnist for GQ magazine, writing the "Dining In" column, which combined often humorous anecdotes with recipes. The "Dining In" columns are collected in Domesticity, a hybrid cookbook/essay collection. He is a contributing editor at Outside magazine, and was instrumental, along with other literary journalists recruited by then-editor Mark Bryant, including Jon Krakauer, Tim Cahill, and Bruce Barcott, in establishing Outside's popular and critical success. Shacochis is also a contributing editor to Harper's, which sent him to Haiti in 1994 to cover the uprising against Jean-Bertrand Aristide, the island nation's first democratically elected President, and the subsequent intervention by US Army Special Forces, with whom Shacochis traveled for nearly a year covering the invasion. The experience resulted in The Immaculate Invasion, Shacochis's first full-length book of nonfiction. Shacochis's nonfiction generally fits into the tradition of the New Journalism popularized by Tom Wolfe, Norman Mailer, and Hunter S. Thompson in the 1960s and 1970s. Kingdoms in the Air, a collection of Shacochis's travel and adventure essays, was published by Grove Atlantic in 2016.

== Bibliography ==
=== Nonfiction ===
- Drinking, Smoking and Screwing: Great Writers on Good Times (1994) ISBN 0-8118-0784-3
- Domesticity: A Gastronomic Interpretation of Love (1994) ISBN 0-684-19642-5
- The Immaculate Invasion (1999) ISBN 0-7475-4529-4
- Conversations with Cuba (2001) ISBN 0-8203-2302-0
- Kingdoms in the Air: Dispatches from the Far Away (2016) ISBN 978-0802124760

=== Fiction ===
- Easy in the Islands (1985) ISBN 0-8021-4059-9
- The Next New World (1990) ISBN 0-14-012105-6
- Swimming in the Volcano (1993) ISBN 0-684-19260-8
- The Woman Who Lost Her Soul (2013) ISBN 0802119824
