= Elgin Groseclose =

American economist (1899–1983)

- Born: 25 November 1899; Waukomis, Oklahoma, U.S.
- Died: 7 April 1983 (aged 83)
- Occupation: Economist
- Spouse: Louise Groseclose
- Children: 4 daughters

Elgin Earl Groseclose (25 November 1899 – 7 April 1983) was an American economist, statesman, and author.

== Early life ==
Elgin Groseclose was born in 1899 in Waukomis, Oklahoma.

== Career ==
After working as special assistant to Arthur Millspaugh's economic mission in Persia, he was appointed Treasurer-General of Persia by the order of the parliament of Iran in 1943. He also headed the Persian Relief Commission and wrote a book entitled Introduction to Iran.

Groseclose was the author of many books. For Ararat, an adventure novel set in Armenia, he won a National Book Award as the Bookseller Discovery of 1939, voted by members of the American Booksellers Association. The annual Discovery identified "outstanding merit which failed to receive adequate sales and recognition".

Groseclose was the co-founder of Groseclose, Williams and Associates, a consulting firm in Washington D.C. He testified before the United States House of Representatives in favor of the silver standard and against foreign aid.

Groseclose served as the president of the Washington City Bible Society.

== Personal life and death ==
With his wife Louise, he had four daughters, Jane, Nancy, Hildegarde, and Suzy. He died on April 7, 1983.

== Books ==
=== Economics & History ===
- Introduction to Iran (1947)
- Money: The Human Conflict (1934)
  - 2nd–4th editions retitled Money and Man (1961, 1967, 1976)
- Fifty Years of Managed Money: The Story of the Federal Reserve (1966)
  - 2nd edition retitled America's Money Machine: The Story of the Federal Reserve (1980)

=== Novels ===
- The Persian Journey of the Reverend Ashley Wishard and His Servant Fathi (1937)
- Ararat (1939, National Book Award, American Booksellers Award, Foundation for Literature Award)
- The Firedrake (1942)
- The Carmelite (1955)
- The Scimitar of Saladin (1956)
- The Kiowa (1978)
- Olympia (1980)

=== Autobiography ===
- Never a Blare of Trumpets ( )

=== Institute for Monetary Research Monographs ===
- Post-War Near Eastern Monetary Standards (1944)
- The Decay of Money (1962)
- Money, Man and Morals (1963)
- Silver as Money (1965)
- The Silken Metal – Silver: Past, Present, Prospective (1975)

== See also ==
- US-Iran relations
