= Jaimy Gordon =

American writer

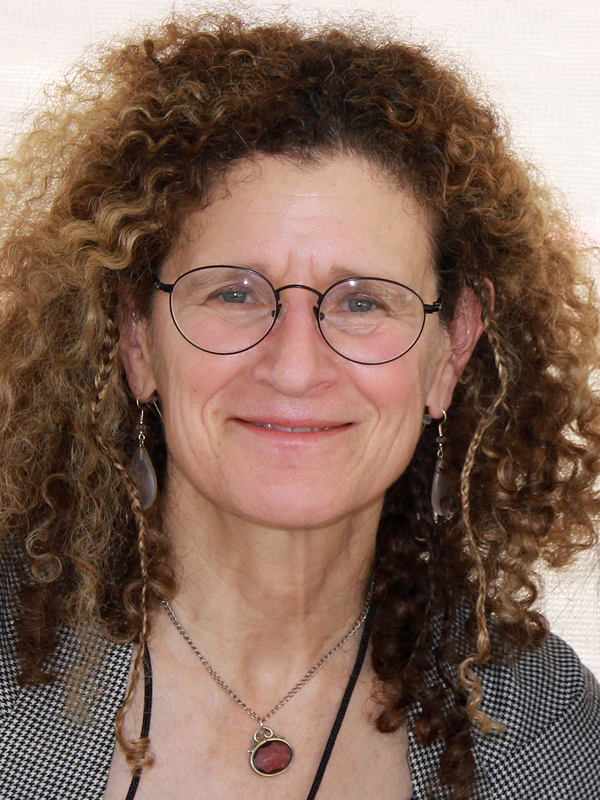
- Born: July 4, 1944 (age 82); Baltimore, Maryland, U.S.

Academic background
- Education: Antioch College; Brown University

Jaimy Gordon (born July 4, 1944) is an American writer. She is a winner of the National Book Award for Fiction.

== Biography ==
She was born in Baltimore. She graduated from Antioch College in 1966, received an MA in English from Brown University in 1972, and earned a Doctor of Arts in Creative Writing in 1975, also from Brown. She currently lives in Kalamazoo, Michigan, where she previously taught in the MFA and PhD program of Western Michigan University.

== Work ==
Gordon is considered to be an important writer, whose literary works have been recognized and highlighted at Michigan State University in their Michigan Writers Series. She is author of the underground fantasy classic Shamp of the City-Solo.

== Awards ==
Her fourth novel, Lord of Misrule, published by McPherson & Co., won the 2010 National Book Award for Fiction. She was named 2019 Michigan Author Award Winner, a lifetime achievement award conferred by the Michigan Library Association.

== Works ==
- Shamp of the City-Solo (Treacle Press, 1974)
- The Rose of the West (Woodbine Press, 1976)
- The Bend, The Lip, The Kid (Sun Press, 1978)
- Private T. Pigeon's Tale (Treacle Press, 1979)
- Circumspections from an Equestrian Statue (Burning Deck, 1979)
- She Drove Without Stopping (Algonquin Books of Chapel Hill, 1990)
- Bogeywoman (Sun & Moon Press, 1999)
- Lord of Misrule (McPherson & Company, 2010)

== Sources ==
- Gargoyle Magazine: An Interview with Jaimy Gordon
