= Julia Glass =

American writer

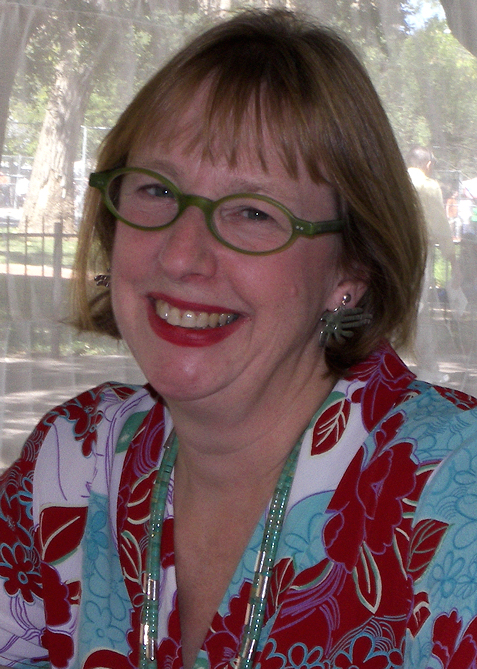
- Julia Glass at the 2010 Texas Book Festival
- Born: March 23, 1956 (age 70); Boston, Massachusetts, U.S.
- Education: Yale University
- Occupation: Novelist
- Partner: Dennis Cowley
- Children: 2
- Writing career
- Notable awards: William Faulkner – William Wisdom Creative Writing Competition; National Book Award

Julia Glass (born March 23, 1956) is an American novelist. Her debut novel, Three Junes, won the National Book Award for Fiction in 2002.

Glass followed Three Junes with a second novel, The Whole World Over, in 2006, set in the same Bank Street–Greenwich Village universe, with three interwoven stories featuring several characters from Three Junes. Her third novel, I See You Everywhere, was published in 2008; her fourth, The Widower's Tale, in 2010; her fifth, And the Dark Sacred Night, in 2014; her sixth, The House Among the Trees, in 2017; her seventh, Vigil Harbor, in 2022.

Glass was born in Boston, grew up in Belmont, Massachusetts and Lincoln, Massachusetts, and attended Concord Academy. She graduated from Yale in 1978. Intending to become a painter, she moved to New York City, where she lived for many years, painting in a small studio in Brooklyn and supporting herself as a freelance editor and copy editor, including several years in the copy department of Cosmopolitan magazine. She lives in Marblehead, Massachusetts, with her partner, the photographer Dennis Cowley, and their two children, and works as a freelance journalist and editor, while teaching fiction writing at Emerson College. She is a previous winner of the William Faulkner - William Wisdom Creative Writing Competition and a 2015 James Merrill House Fellow.

== Bibliography ==
- Three Junes (novel). Pantheon Books. 2002. ISBN 978-0-385-72142-4.
- The Whole World Over (novel). Pantheon Books. 2006. ISBN 0-375-42274-9.
- I See You Everywhere (novel). Pantheon Books. 2008. ISBN 978-0-375-42275-1.
- The Widower's Tale (novel). Pentheon Books. 2010. ISBN 978-0-307-37792-0.
- And the Dark Sacred Night (novel). Pantheon Books. 2014. ISBN 978-0-307-37793-7.
- A House Among the Trees (novel). Pantheon Books. 2017. ISBN 978-1-10187-036-5.
- Vigil Harbor (novel). Pantheon Books. 2022. ISBN 978-1-10187-038-9.
