= Three Junes =

2002 novel by Julia Glass

- First edition
- Author: Julia Glass
- Publisher: Pantheon Books
- Publication date: 2002
- Publication place: United States
- Media type: Print (hardcover)
- ISBN: 0-375-42144-0

Three Junes is Julia Glass' debut novel. It won the U.S. National Book Award for Fiction in 2002.

== Plot summary ==
Three Junes follows the McLeods, a Scottish family, throughout their lives and relationships. Its members are Paul and Maureen, and their sons: Fenno, and twins David and Dennis. At the opening of the book, Paul is on a tour of Greece, Maureen has died from lung cancer, and Fenno is running a bookstore in New York City. Other important characters include Malachy, Fenno's friend who is a music critic and suffering from AIDS, and Fern, an unwed pregnant woman, whom Paul formerly met on his trip to Greece, trying to recover from his wife's death. Finally, another important character of the book is Tony, a photographer, who is a house-sitter, never living in the same house for more than a few months. He is a catalyst in the narrative development of Fern and Fenno. He is an old friend with Fern and he develops a tumultuous relationship with Fenno.

The novel is written in three parts, using the flashback technique. The first takes place in 1989 and is told from Paul's perspective; the second, in 1995 and from Fenno's point of view; the third, in 1999 and from Fern's perspective. As Julia Glass has said herself, the book should be viewed not as a trilogy but rather a triptych – elements that may seem small in one section play a large role in another, like a triptych, rather than a consecutive series of novels in a trilogy.
