= Lord of Misrule (novel) =

2010 novel by Jaimy Gordon

- Hardcover edition
- Author: Jaimy Gordon
- Language: English
- Genre: Literary fiction
- Publisher: McPherson
- Publication date: 2010
- Publication place: United States
- Media type: Print (hardback & paperback)
- Pages: 294 pp.
- ISBN: 978-0307946737

Lord of Misrule is a 2010 novel by Jaimy Gordon. The book is divided into four sections, each concerned with one of four horse races at a "down on the luck" racetrack.

The novel drew a positive response, with many reviewers focusing on Gordon's skillful and complex prose style. It received the National Book Award for Fiction in 2010. This "dark horse" victory surprised its publishing house, McPherson & Company, which did not have enough copies ready to meet demand immediately after the win.

== Style ==
Many reviewers of the novel comment on Gordon's distinctive style and control of language. In The Washington Post, reviewer Jane Smiley wrote that "Gordon has completely mastered the language of the racetrack, and formed it into an evocative and idiosyncratic style." On the other hand, The New York Times emphasized the complex and well used vocabulary applied by Gordon to this setting, writing "Ms. Gordon is a showy enough linguist to make gloriously apt use of the words hierodule, unmiscible and catawamptious. Bet on this: you’ll never see those three words in the same book again."

== Critical reception ==
Generally reviews of the novel were positive, many of them placing praise on Gordon's control of language and action. The New York Times reviewer Janet Maslin praised the novel, liking its plot, but principally praising its style, she writes that the novel "achieve[s] miraculous effects with both dialogue and dialect" and "book is best remembered for flashes of startling beauty." The Washington Post similarly appreciated the plot and action, but focused on the novel's language, writing as well. However, with some reluctance The Washington Post writes that its "such a beautifully written novel that I wish I could say that every element works to perfection; I can't," noting that the multiple perspectives of the characters never allow intimacy with them.

The LA Times emphasized the careful balance between beautiful description and philosophical reflection on the burdens and woes of both the humans and the horses. Reynolds, the reviewer, writes "All of this makes "Lord of Misrule" a fun book to read, fun that comes not without its raw anxieties [about life]." The Independent was similarly praising starting the review with the novel is "big on character and narrative finesse" and concluding that "Lord of Misrule is by no means perfect. There are some passages of overblown prose and Tommy is less fleshed out than the other characters. But there is something mesmerising about Gordon's portrait."
