= Homesick: My Own Story =

1982 children's autobiography by Jean Fritz

- Author: Jean Fritz
- Illustrator: Margot Tomes
- Language: English
- Genre: Children's history
- Publisher: Putnam
- Publication date: 1982
- Publication place: United States
- Pages: 163
- Followed by: China Homecoming

Homesick: My Own Story is a 1982 autobiography written by Jean Fritz and illustrated by Margot Tomes. The book recounts Fritz's life as a young girl in China, from October 1925 to the start of the Chinese Civil War in September 1927, at which point her family fled the country and returned to the United States. In 1983, the book won the National Book Award for Children's Books and received a Newbery Honor. A companion book detailing Fritz' return to China as an adult, China Homecoming, was published in 1985.
