= Hannah Lillith Assadi =

American author

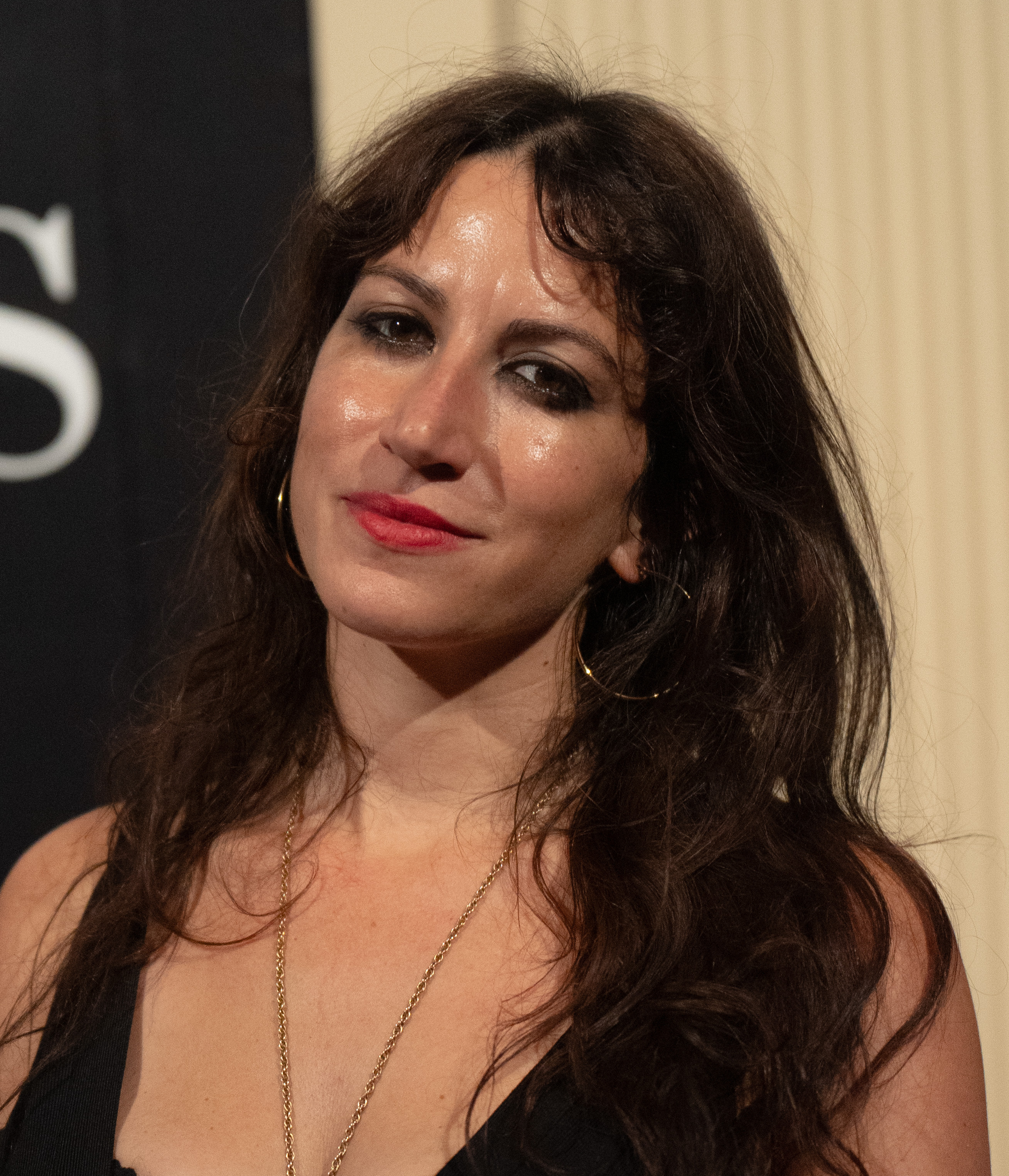
- Assadi in 2024
- Born: 1986 (age 39–40); New York City, New York, U.S.
- Education: Columbia University (BA, MFA)
- Notable work: Sonora; Paradiso 17
- Awards: "5 Under 35" Honoree (2018); National Book Award (2026)
- Website: hannahlassadi.com

Hannah Lillith Assadi (born 1986) is an American novelist. She is the author of Sonora (2017), The Stars Are Not Yet Bells (2022), and Paradiso 17 (2026).

== Early life and education ==
Assadi was born to a Jewish mother and a Palestinian father. Her father (1943-2022) was born in Safed and fled with his family during the Nakba, living first in Syria and later in Kuwait. He later studied in Perugia, Italy, before moving to New York City, where he worked in the shipping industry and as a taxi driver. Assadi's mother lived in Florala, Alabama, where her family was the only Jewish family in town, before moving to New York City. The couple met in Tribeca in 1983, and married the following year.

Assadi was born in New York City, and the family moved to Arizona when she was five. She grew up in Scottsdale, and celebrated both the High Holidays and Eid.

Assadi attended Columbia University, where she earned a Bachelor of Arts in Middle Eastern Literature and Creative Writing, followed by a Master of Fine Arts in Fiction.

== Career ==
Assadi wrote her first novel in Paris, although she has said that work will likely never be published.

Her debut novel, Sonora, started as an assignment for her master's degree. It was published by Soho Press in 2017 and received the Rosenthal Family Foundation Award from the American Academy of Arts and Letters. It was a finalist for the PEN/Robert W. Bingham Prize for Debut Fiction. It was received positively by Huffpost, Kirkus Reviews, and Publishers Weekly.

In 2018, she was named a National Book Foundation "5 Under 35" Honoree.

Her second novel, The Stars Are Not Yet Bells, was published by Riverhead Books in 2022. It was named a "Best Book of 2022" by The New Yorker and NPR, and was received positively by Kirkus Reviews, Vanity Fair and The Washington Post. In a starred review, Publishers Weekly wrote "The beauty of Assadi’s prose and the splendid depiction of a love that transcends death make for a singular rendition of an oft-told story."

Her third novel, Paradiso 17, was published by Knopf in March 2026. Kirkus Reviews gave the novel a starred review and wrote: "In a sweeping, deeply personal novel based on the life of Assadi’s father, a Palestinian exile roams from the Middle East through Europe and America, picking up and discarding identities, always yearning to find his true home." The book was longlisted for the 2026 Women's Prize for Fiction. It won the 2026 National Book Award for Fiction.

Assadi teaches fiction writing at the Columbia University School of the Arts and the Pratt Institute.

Assadi and Omar Khalifah co-edited Darwish: Poems, an expansive collection of poems by Mahmoud Darwish, featuring new translations, released by Everyman's Library and Knopf in November 2026.

== Personal life ==
Assadi moved to New York City in the mid 2000s, and lives in Brooklyn as of 2022. She is married and has two children. She has said she is spiritual, but is neither Jewish nor Muslim, as "religion doesn't speak to her".

== Publications ==
=== Novels ===
- Sonora. Soho Press. 2017. ISBN 9781616957926.
- The Stars Are Not Yet Bells. Riverhead Books. 2022. ISBN 9780593084366.
- Paradiso 17. Knopf. 2026. ISBN 9780593804056.

=== As editor ===
- Hannah Lillith Assadi; Omar Khalifah, eds. (2026). Darwish: Poems. Everyman's Library. ISBN 9798217009657.
