= Jason Mott =

American novelist

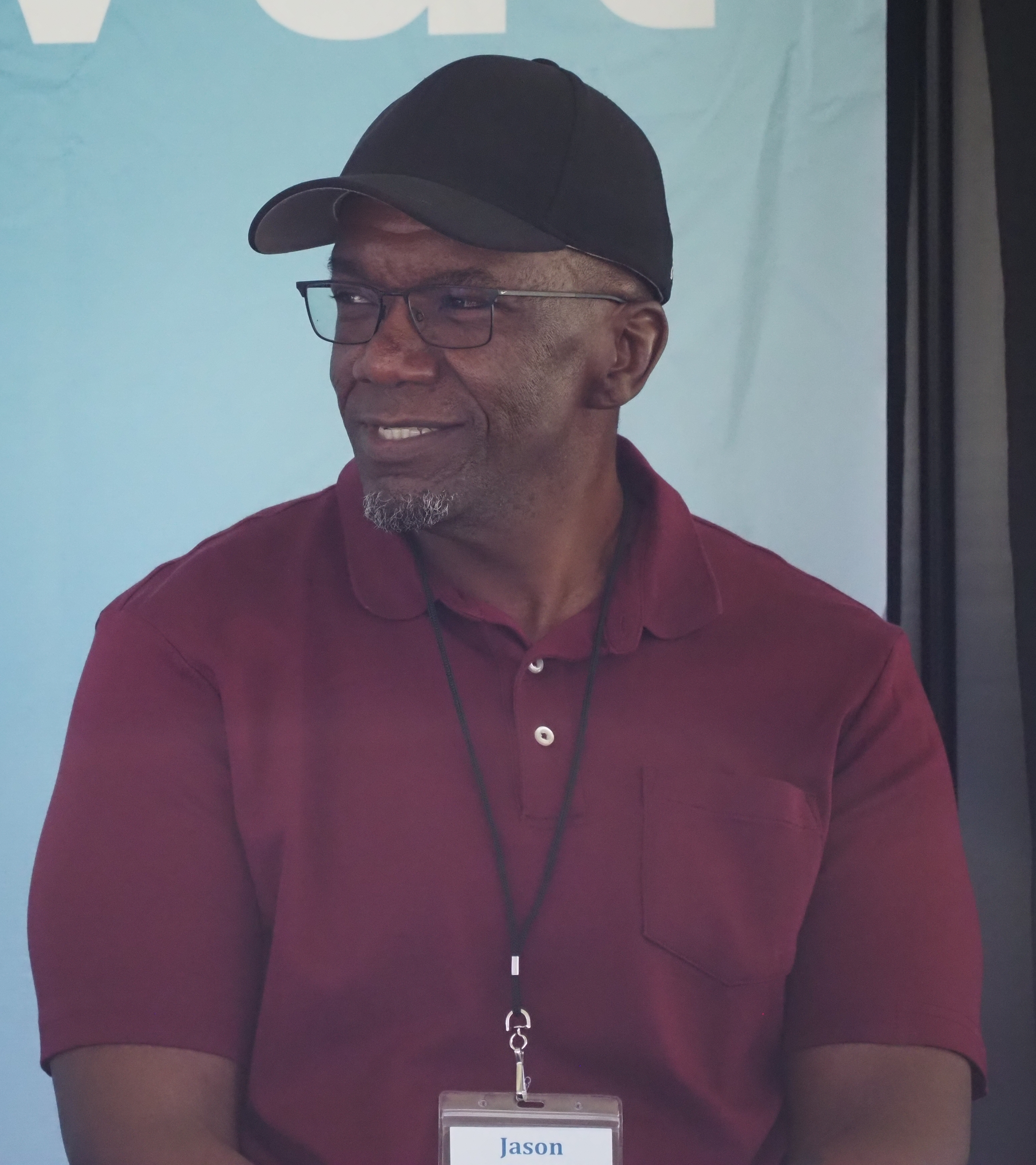
- Mott at the 2026 Gaithersburg Book Festival
- Born: Bolton, North Carolina, U.S.
- Education: University of North Carolina Wilmington (BFA, MFA)
- Occupation: Writer
- Writing career
- Language: English
- Genres: Novels; poetry
- Notable works: The Returned (2013); Hell of a Book (2021)
- Notable awards: National Book Award for Fiction (2021)
- Website: jasonmottauthor.com

Jason Mott is an American novelist and poet. His fourth novel, Hell of a Book, won the 2021 National Book Award for Fiction.

== Early life and education ==
Mott was born in Bolton, North Carolina. He attended Cape Fear Community College and graduated from the University of North Carolina Wilmington with a Bachelor of Fine Arts in Fiction and a Master of Fine Arts in Poetry.

== Writing ==
Mott's debut novel, The Returned, was published in 2013. It centered on the return of dead people to the living world and their impact on the daily lives of the people around them. The novel was adapted into the television series Resurrection, which was produced by ABC Studios and aired in 2014.

Mott's second novel, The Wonder of All Things, was published in 2014. It is a magically realistic look at the tension between protecting a child's gift of supernatural healing and sacrificing it for the greater good.

Mott's third novel, The Crossing, was published in 2018. It is a dystopian thriller that follows two siblings forced on the run to do whatever it takes to survive.

Mott's fourth and most critically acclaimed novel, Hell of a Book, was published by E. P. Dutton on June 29, 2021. It is at times an absurdist and metafictional look into the complex and fraught African American experience. On November 17, 2021, the novel was awarded the 2021 National Book Award for Fiction. It also received the 2021 Sir Walter Raleigh Prize for Fiction and the 2022 Housatonic Book Award for Fiction. It was shortlisted for the 2022 Chautauqua Prize. It was also longlisted for the 2022 Andrew Carnegie Medal for Excellence in Fiction, the 2022 Aspen Words Literary Prize, and the 2022 Joyce Carol Oates Literary Prize. It was also a finalist for the 2022 Maya Angelou Book Award.

Mott was the recipient of a 2024 National Endowment for the Arts Fellowship for Creative Writing.

== Awards ==
=== Literary prize ===
Year	Title	Award	Category	Result	Ref
2021	Hell of a Book	National Book Award	Fiction	Won	
2021	Hell of a Book	North Carolina Book Awards	Fiction	Won	
2022	Hell of a Book	Andrew Carnegie Medals for Excellence	Fiction	Longlisted	
2022	Hell of a Book	Aspen Words Literary Prize	—	Longlisted	
2022	Hell of a Book	Chautauqua Prize	—	Shortlisted	
2022	Hell of a Book	Joyce Carol Oates Literary Prize	—	Shortlisted	
2022	Hell of a Book	Maya Angelou Book Award	—	Finalist	

=== Honors ===
- 2024 National Endowment for the Arts Fellowship for Creative Writing

== Works ==
=== Novels ===
- — (2013). The Returned. Don Mills, Ontario: Mira Books. ISBN 978-0-7783-1533-9.
- — (2014). The Wonder of All Things. Don Mills, Ontario: Mira Books. ISBN 978-0-7783-1652-7.
- — (2018). The Crossing. Toronto, Ontario: Park Row Books. ISBN 9780778330738.
- — (2021). Hell of a Book: Or the Altogether Factual, Wholly Bona Fide Story of a Big Dreams, Hard Luck, American-Made Mad Kid. New York: Dutton. ISBN 978-0-593-33096-8.
- — (2025). People Like Us: or The Other Continent, or Johnny Wordcount Stumbles Into a High-end Croissant Bar on the Seine in Search of The Kid & Orders the Big Dream. New York, New York: Dutton. ISBN 9798217047116.

=== Poetry collections ===
- — (2009). We Call This Thing Between Us Love. Charlotte, North Carolina: Main Street Rag Publishing Company. ISBN 978-1-59948-210-1.
- — (2011). "...hide behind me...". Charlotte, North Carolina: Main Street Rag Publishing Company. ISBN 978-1-59948-316-0.

=== Short fiction ===
- — (2023). "Best of Luck". Seattle, Washington: Amazon Original Stories. ISBN 978-1-6625-1671-9.
