= Mira Books =

Canadian publishing imprint

- Parent company: Harlequin (HarperCollins)
- Founded: 1994
- Country of origin: Canada
- Headquarters location: Toronto
- Publication types: Books
- Official website: www.mirabooks.com

MIRA Books is a book publishing imprint of Harlequin Enterprises that focuses on mainstream fiction. It was launched in 1994.

== Profile ==
MIRA publishes a range of fiction from thrillers to fantasy to chick-lit to historical fiction. It has featured authors such as Elizabeth Flock, Pam Jenoff, and Marcia Preston. These names have added to an increasingly long list of authors that includes established names like Alex Kava, Erica Spindler, and Tess Gerritsen.

MIRA has gained a reputation for crime fiction, with authors such as Paul Johnston, M. J. Rose, Chris Jordan and P.D. Martin amongst others and debuts from Steven Hague, Jason Pinter, and J.T. Ellison amongst others in 2008.
