= Hell of a Book =

2021 novel by Jason Mott

- First edition cover
- Author: Jason Mott
- Language: English
- Publisher: Dutton
- Publication date: 2021
- Publication place: United States
- Pages: 323 pp
- ISBN: 978-0593330999

Hell of a Book (Note: The full title of the novel is Hell of a Book: Or the Altogether Factual, Wholly Bona Fide Story of a Big Dreams, Hard Luck, American-Made Mad Kid.) is a 2021 book by Jason Mott. It won the 2021 National Book Award for Fiction.

== Plot summary ==
In alternating chapters, the novel tells the stories of two different characters: a nameless novelist on tour for a book also titled Hell of a Book, and an African-American child named Soot. Soot, who lives near Whiteville, North Carolina, is being bullied on the school bus, while the novelist is troubled by visions of a child he calls "The Kid", who speaks to him and seemingly guides him through his issues.

== Reception ==
The Star-News said that with the novel, Mott earned "a place on the shelf beside such African-American writers as Colson Whitehead and Octavia Butler".

On November 17, 2021, the novel was awarded the 2021 National Book Award for Fiction. It was also longlisted for the 2022 Andrew Carnegie Medal for Excellence in Fiction, the 2022 Aspen Words Literary Prize, and the 2022 Joyce Carol Oates Prize.
