= The Returned (novel) =

2011 novel Jason Mott

- Author: Jason Mott
- Language: English
- Genre: fantasy science fiction
- Publisher: Mira Books
- Publication date: August 27, 2013
- Publication place: United States
- Media type: Print (hardback & paperback)
- Pages: 338
- ISBN: 9780778315339

The Returned is the debut novel by American author Jason Mott, published in 2013. It is centered on the return of dead people to the living world and their impact on the daily lives of the people around them. The TV adaptation Resurrection was produced by ABC Studios and aired on March 9, 2014.

== Plot ==
The series follows residents of Arcadia, North Carolina, in particular the Hargrave family, whose lives are upended when their loved ones return from the dead, unaged since their deaths. Among the returned is Jacob Hargrave, an eight-year-old boy who drowned 32 years earlier. Having been found alive, Jacob is brought back by the Bureau, which investigates the phenomenon of the Returned. The military agent Bellamy returns Jacob to his parents, Harold and Lucille Hargrave, who must deal with his return.

The novel also occasionally looks at the phenomenon from the viewpoint of the Returned, who appear to have no knowledge of or explanation for their return, and only want to live their lives. The Returned are described as being largely identical to their pre-death selves except for strange quirks that are frequently described as odd or unnerving by people who formerly knew them.

Harold initially refuses to see the Returned Jacob as his son, as he had been the one to pull Jacob's body out of the river, but Lucille fully embraces his return as a miracle. As the novel progresses Harold slowly softens to Jacob's presence, even going so far as to willingly accompany the boy when the military imprisons all of the Returned at an Arcadian schoolhouse. While imprisoned, Harold is made the temporary caretaker of an elderly woman with dementia, Patricia – a woman he later discovers is Bellamy's mother, as the agent knew that Harold would treat her with consideration.

The imprisonment is met with some controversy on both sides, as the Returned resent being caged like animals, while a movement called the "True Living" see the Returned as beings that need to be destroyed. This movement strikes a particular chord with Fred Green, a local widower who grows resentful towards the Returned when his wife does not come back. Fred leads other locals in a series of protests that eventually grow violent and result in a riot at the schoolhouse where the Returned are tear gassed. After the riot the entire town is put in lockdown and used as a containment facility for the Returned, which only causes the townspeople to grow more resentful.

During all of this Lucille is left alone at her house trying to make sense of everything, and she takes in a Returned family, the Wilsons. After they are abducted she begins to believe that she is supposed to help defend the Returned, leading her to stage a revolt that results in the Returned's taking control of the town. She manages to save Harold, Jacob, and most of the Wilsons, although Jim Wilson is killed in the process. They make it home, but Fred follows them and threatens to burn down their home if they do not surrender all of the Returned. Harold tries to trick Fred into believing that he's killed the Returned Wilsons and Jacob, but Fred sees through this and proceeds to burn the house down.

The Wilsons manage to escape, but Lucille dies trying to protect Jacob. Fred nearly kills Jacob and Harold, but is moved to sympathy after Jacob states that he doesn't know the reason why he returned instead of his wife.

After the fire Harold rebuilds the house, but Jacob has grown quiet and withdrawn, spending his days at Lucille's grave. Bellamy occasionally visits them and on one visit informs them that the Returned are slowly vanishing. Harold finds a letter left by Lucille wherein she admits that she's always known that Returned Jacob wasn't their son, but advises Harold to love Jacob and let them go, as this is the proper order of things. As he goes outside, Harold finds that Jacob has vanished and realizes that while Lucille never believed that the Returned Jacob was her son, Harold always knew.

== Reception ==
The novel received positive reviews. Kirkus Reviews stated, "Poet and debut author Mott has written a breathtaking novel that navigates emotional minefields with realism and grace." Entertainment Weekly wrote, "Toward the end, the plot veers into standard thriller territory, with hints of Nicholas Sparks-level mawkishness. But Mott turns phrases with poetic grace (The crowd parted like heavy batter), and it's in the quieter moments that The Returned pulses with life."

The TV series based on the book was ordered by ABC before the official publication date of the novel, based on the novel's "high concept", according to ABC. It lasted two seasons.

== Novellas ==
Jason Mott wrote several novellas in the universe of The Returned:

- The First (2013)
- The Sparrow (2013)
- The Choice (2013)
