= James Post =

James Post may refer to:

- James D. Post (1863–1921), U.S. Representative from Ohio
- James E. Post, professor in management at Boston University
- James N. Post III, American military officer
- James F. Post (1818–1899), architect, builder, and contractor
