= Aspen Review Central Europe =

English-language quarterly

- Editor-in-chief: Aleksander Kaczorowski
- Categories: Political magazine
- Frequency: Quarterly
- Founder: Aspen Institute Central Europe
- Founded: 2012; 13 years ago
- Based in: Prague
- Language: English
- Website: https://www.aspen.review/
- ISSN: 1805-6806

Aspen Review Central Europe (also known as Aspen Review) is an English-language quarterly magazine devoted to political, social, economic and cultural issues of Central Europe.

== History and profile ==
Aspen Review Central Europe was established in 2012. It is published by Aspen Institute Central Europe, a Prague-based branch of the American Aspen Institute. The magazine features Central European political, social and economic issues. It contains analyses, interviews and commentaries by politicians, journalists, experts and scholars from Central Europe and the United States mostly.

The editor-in-chief is Aleksander Kaczorowski, Polish publicist, journalist, and translator. Advisory board includes e.g.: Walter Isaacson, Yurii Andrukhovych, Michael Žantovský, Zbigniew Pełczyński, Petr Pithart, and Mariusz Szczygieł.

Among authors are heads of state (e.g. Mikuláš Dzurinda, Toomas Hendrik Ilves), ministers (e.g. A. Wess Mitchell, Jerzy Hausner, Iveta Radičová), as well as renowned academics, journalists and intellectuals (e.g. Adam Hochschild, Colin Crouch, Ivaylo Ditchev, Frank Furedi, François Godement, Luuk van Middelaar, Jan-Werner Müller, Brendan Simms, Kenneth R. Weinstein, Artur Domosławski, Herfried Münkler, Ivan Krastev, Michael W. Doyle, Timothy D. Snyder, Ulrike Guérot). Several articles are translated and published by other journals.

Since its launch, the magazine is published in English. For the first two years, it was published also in Czech and Polish languages.
