= Aspen Institute =

International nonprofit organization

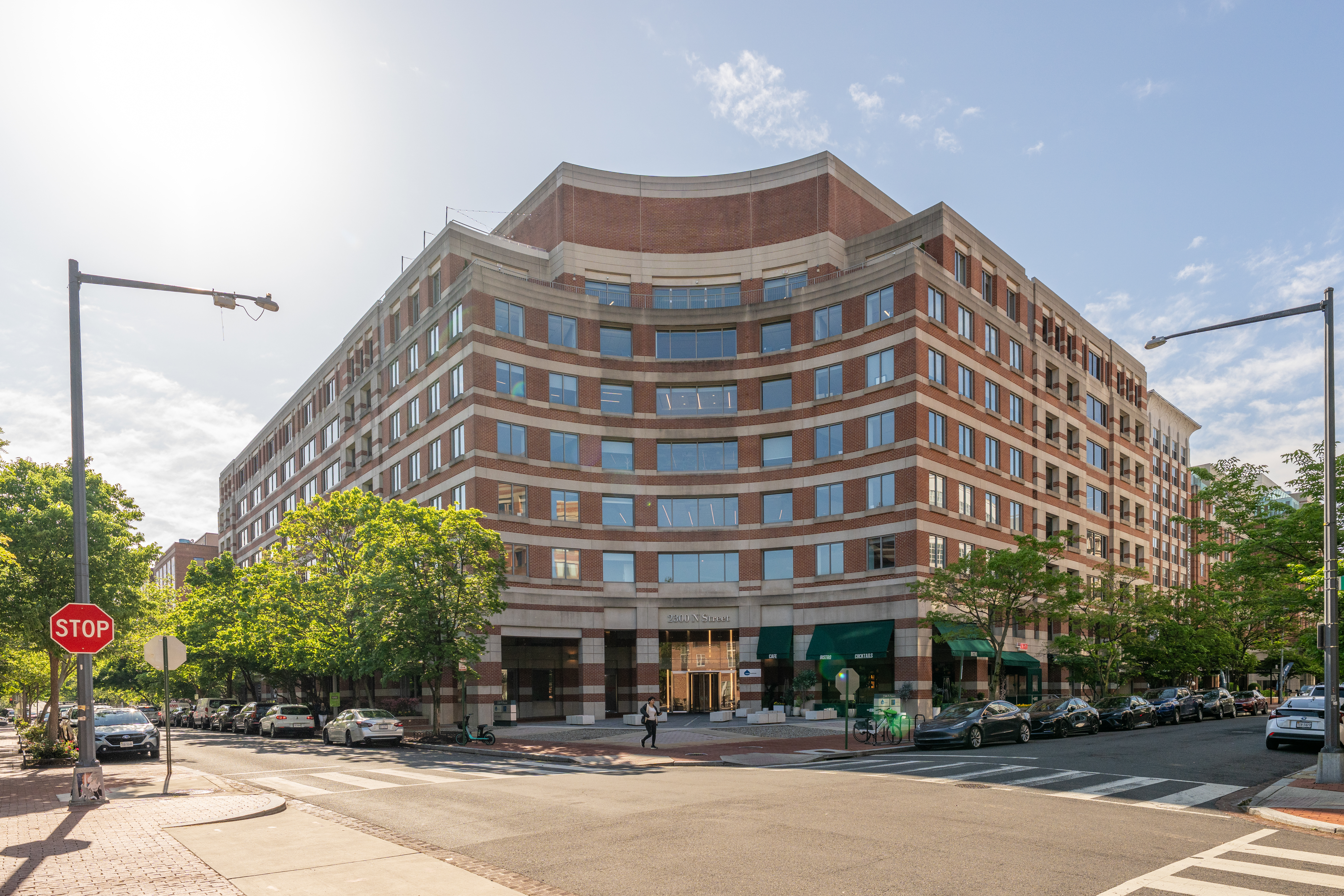
- Headquarters in Washington, D.C.
- Formation: 1949; 77 years ago
- Founder: Walter Paepcke
- Type: Nonprofit organization
- Tax ID no.: 84-0399006
- Headquarters: 2300 N Street, NW, Suite 700
- Location: Washington, D.C., U.S.
- President & CEO: Ángel Cabrera
- Revenue: $444 million (2024)
- Expenses: $234 million (2024)
- Employees: 754 (2024)
- Website: www.aspeninstitute.org

The Aspen Institute is an international nonprofit organization founded in 1949 as the Aspen Institute for Humanistic Studies. It is headquartered in Washington, D.C., but also has a campus in Aspen, Colorado, its original home.

Its stated mission is to "drive change through dialogue, leadership, and action to help solve the greatest challenges of our time". The Aspen Institute’s work focuses on many sectors including business, education, communications, energy and environment, health, security and international affairs.

== History ==
The institute was largely the creation of Walter Paepcke, a Chicago businessman who had become inspired by the Great Books program of Mortimer Adler at the University of Chicago. In 1945, Paepcke visited Bauhaus artist and architect Herbert Bayer, AIA, who had designed and built a Bauhaus-inspired minimalist home outside the decaying former mining town of Aspen, in the Roaring Fork Valley. Paepcke and Bayer envisioned a place where artists, leaders, thinkers, and musicians could gather. Shortly thereafter, while passing through Aspen on a hunting expedition, oil industry maverick Robert O. Anderson (soon to be founder and CEO of Atlantic Richfield) met with Bayer and shared in Paepcke's and Bayer's vision. In 1949, Paepcke organized a 20-day international celebration for the 200th birthday of German poet and philosopher Johann Wolfgang von Goethe. The celebration attracted over 2,000 attendees, including Albert Schweitzer, José Ortega y Gasset, Thornton Wilder, and Arthur Rubinstein.

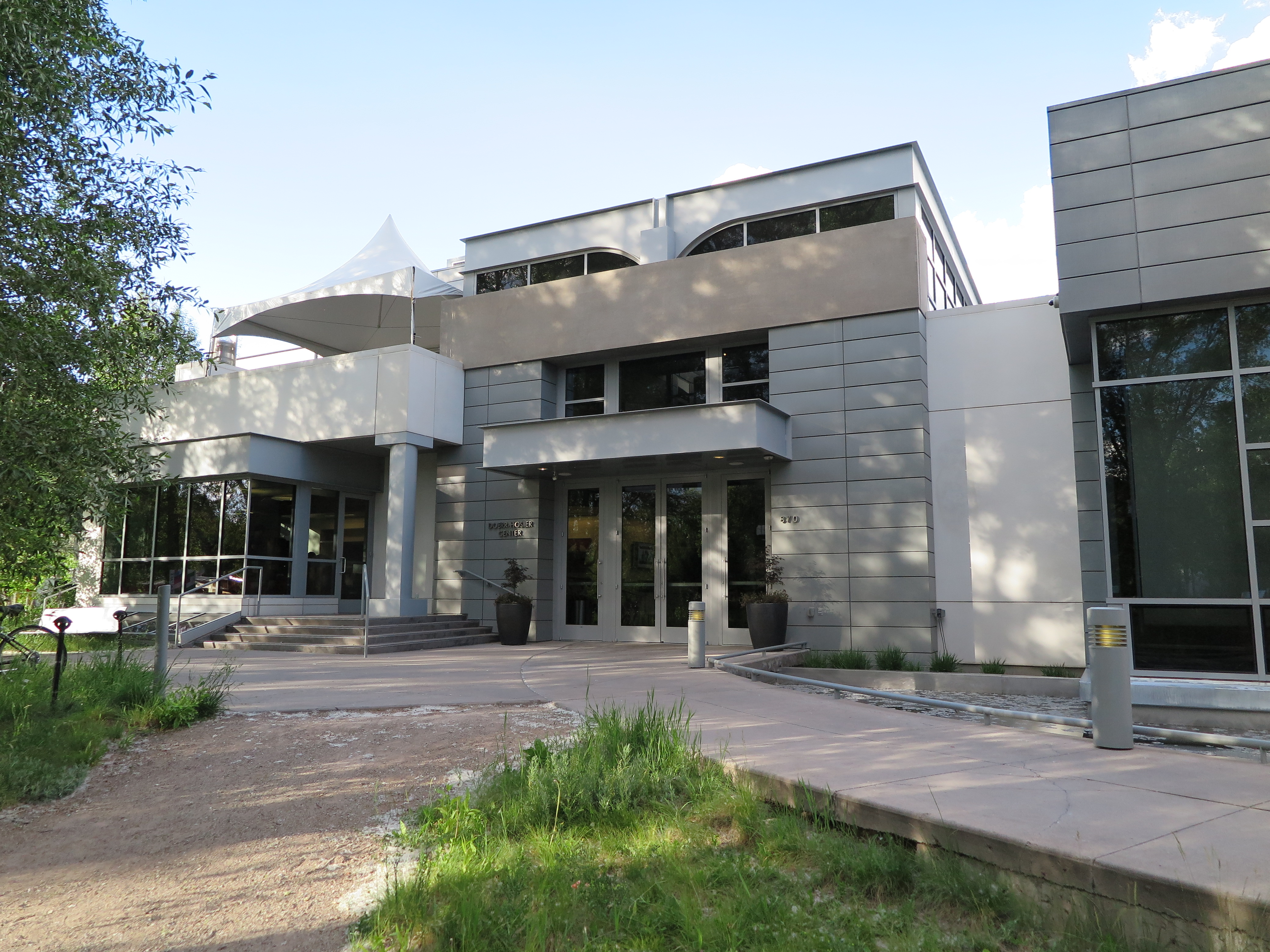
Doerr-Hosier Center at the Aspen Institute in Aspen, Colorado

In 1950, the Paepckes, Adler, and Robert Hutchins, then the Chancellor of the University of Chicago, founded the Aspen Institute for Humanistic Studies; and later the Aspen Music Festival and eventually (with Bayer and Anderson) the International Design Conference at Aspen (IDCA). Paepcke sought a forum "where the human spirit can flourish", especially amid modernization. He hoped that the institute could help business leaders recapture what he called "eternal verities": the values that guided them intellectually, ethically, and spiritually as they led their companies. Inspired by philosopher Mortimer Adler's Great Books seminar at the University of Chicago, which was later adopted by Encyclopædia Britannica's Great Books of the Western World, Paepcke worked with Anderson to create the Aspen Institute Executive Seminar. In 1951, the institute sponsored a national photography conference. During the 1960s and 1970s, the institute added organizations, programs, and conferences, including the Aspen Center for Physics, the Aspen Strategy Group, Communications and Society Program and other programs that concentrated on education, communications, justice, Asian thought, science, technology, the environment, and international affairs.

In 1979, through a donation by Corning Glass industrialist and philanthropist Arthur A. Houghton Jr., the institute acquired a 1,000-acre (4 km^{2}) campus on the eastern shore of the Chesapeake Bay in Maryland, known today as the Wye River Conference Centers.

The Wye River campus has hosted several historic meetings, including the 1998 Wye Accord for Peace in the Middle East. In 2022, the Institute gifted and sold a combined 563 acres of the campus to the University of Maryland for continued use for research and education purposes, donating the rest to the Hole in the Wall Gang Camp to be renovated for free programming for children with serious illnesses and their families.

In 1983, former United States senator Dick Clark founded the Aspen Institute's Congressional program, which sought to educate members of Congress on foreign affairs issues.

In 2005, the Aspen Institute held the first Aspen Ideas Festival, featuring leading minds from around the world sharing and speaking on global issues. The institute hosts the festival annually, co-hosting with The Atlantic until 2020. It has trained philanthropists such as Carrie Morgridge. It has since added additional events such as the Aspen Ideas Health and Aspen Ideas Climate. In 2023, the Aspen Ideas Climate event included Vice President Kamala Harris and famed singer Gloria Estefan.

Since 2013, the Aspen Institute together with U.S. magazine The Atlantic until 2019 and Bloomberg Philanthropies since, has participated in organizing the annual CityLab event, a summit dedicated to developing strategies for the challenges of urbanization in today's cities.

Walter Isaacson was the president and CEO of Aspen Institute from 2003 to June 2018. Isaacson announced in March 2017 that he would step down as president and CEO at the end of the year. On November 30, 2017, Daniel Porterfield was announced as his successor. Porterfield succeeded Isaacson on June 1, 2018.

In 2019, the Institute announced the Aspen Partnership for an Inclusive Economy, receiving a $26 million gift from Mastercard to mobilize the public, private, and nonprofit sectors to address income and information inequality and create inclusive growth.

In 2022, the Institute unveiled the Resnick Center for Herbert Bayer Studies, commemorating the artist’s legacy as one of the Institute’s co-founders and as a longtime Aspen resident.

In 2023, Simon Godwin was named Aspen Institute's Harman/Eisner artist in residence. Godwin is the artistic director for the Shakespeare Theatre Company and served a one-year residency at the institute. In June 2023, CAA's Bruno del Granado was named to be head of the Board of the Aspen Institute's Latinos Society Program.

In August 2024, the Bezos Family Foundation gifted the Institute a $175 million endowment to create the Center for Rising Generations at the Aspen Institute, the purpose of which is to ensure that which will expand opportunities for youth and young adult civic engagement, civil dialogue, and leadership development.

== Organizational structure ==
The Aspen Institute is a nonprofit organization governed by a Board of Trustees, currently chaired by Margot Pritzker, comprising leaders from various sectors, including business, government, academia, and philanthropy.

=== Programs and initiatives ===
The Aspen Institute pursues its mission through more than 50 programs spanning policy, public engagement, leadership, and youth and young adult initiatives.The Aspen Institute operates multiple policy programs focused on nonpartisan analysis and dialogue across key societal issues. They work across a range of issues including business, education, communications, energy and environment, health, security, and international affairs.

==== Leadership programs ====
Leadership development is a core part of the Aspen Institute’s mission, equipping leaders across sectors, generations, and geographies with values-based leadership skills to drive positive change in their communities and industries.

The Aspen Executive Seminar, one of the Institute’s longest-running leadership programs, brings together senior executives and public leaders to engage in deep discussions on values, ethics, and leadership. Another key program is the Aspen Global Leadership Network (AGLN), a worldwide community of nearly 4,000 leaders from 62+ countries, spanning business, government and the nonprofit sector, all committed to addressing complex societal challenges. The AGLN comprises 14 regional and sector-specific fellowships, which support leaders in their respective fields through curated seminars, mentorship, and cross-sector collaboration.

==== International partners ====
In addition to its U.S.-based activities, the Aspen Institute has a growing global presence. Since 1974 the Aspen Institute has inspired 13 independently-governed and self-funding international partner organizations in 16 countries: Central Europe (Czechia, Hungary, Poland, Slovakia), Colombia, France, Germany, India, Italy, Japan, Mexico, New Zealand, Romania, Spain, Ukraine, and the United Kingdom.

== Aspen community programs ==
=== Speaker lineup ===
The Aspen Institute's community program includes lecturers from the Hurst Lecture Series; the McCloskey Speaker Series; and the Murdock Mind, Body, Spirit series.

The 2024 Summer lineup included professors from the University of California, Berkeley; Harvard Medical School; Cleveland Clinic; and the University of Michigan.

== Assets ==
As of 2023 the Aspen Institute had net assets of $408,226,171.

=== Funding details ===
Funding details as of 2023:
Revenue and support as of 2023: $232,109,335
1. Contributions and grants (76.1%)
2. Program service revenue (21.6%)
3. Investment income (1.60%)
4. Other revenue (0.70%)
Expenses as of 2023: $225,738,675
1. Policy Programs (63.3%)
2. Campus Activities (9.43%)
3. Public Programs (9.03%)
4. Global Leadership Network (6.95%)
5. Youth & Engagement (2.49%)
6. Seminars (3.32%)
7. Other Restricted Programs (3.05%)
8. Support services (2.47%)

The Institute is largely funded by foundations such as the Carnegie Corporation, the Rockefeller Brothers Fund, the Gates Foundation, the Lumina Foundation, and the Ford Foundation, by seminar fees, and by individual donations. Its board of trustees includes leaders from politics, government, business and academia who also contribute to its support. A report by the Center for International Policy's Foreign Influence Transparency Initiative of the top 50 think tanks found that from 2014 to 2018 the Aspen Institute received more than US$8 million in funding from outside the United States, the fifth-highest amount among think tanks. This funding originated primarily in Western democracies but also included "sizeable donations from undemocratic regimes in Saudi Arabia and the United Arab Emirates."

In April 2020, the company received approximately $8 million in federally backed small business loans as part of the Paycheck Protection Program. The company received scrutiny over this loan, which meant to protect small and private businesses. The Washington Post noted their large endowment and membership of billionaires made this problematic. Dele Olojede, a fellow at the institute, called it "contrary to the stated purpose of this institute", that "one of America’s most elite institutions thinks it is okay to take the money", going on to say "Those who purport to be values-based and public-spirited leaders cannot at the same time put self interest first, when there is so much human suffering and death". The day after Olojede and the Washington Post highlighted the funding, Aspen Institute announced they would return it, stating "Upon listening to our communities and further reflection, we have made the decision to return the loan".

== Fellowships ==
The Aspen Institute offers a range of fellowships that support leaders from diverse backgrounds and work on issues such as economic policy, education, finance, public health, environmental sustainability, and journalism. These fellowships provide opportunities for professionals to develop leadership skills and explore solutions to complex challenges through structured discussions and collaborative learning. These include:

=== Henry Crown Fellowship ===
The Henry Crown Fellowship, established in 1997, educates accomplished entrepreneurs from the private sector to become leaders in community and global development projects. The Aspen Global Leadership Network inducts an annual class of 20-22 candidates between the ages of 30-46 for a two-year training program. Instruction takes place at the Aspen Institute's campus in Aspen, Colorado, and various sites abroad.

=== New Voices Fellowship ===
The New Voices Fellowship is a year long program for applicants from Africa, Asia, and Latin America. Every year, nominations are accepted from August through October. Fellows are selected in December and announced publicly in early January.

The New Voices Fellowship is a non-residential program. During the fellowship year, fellows meet three times for one week sessions. There are no age limitations for fellows. All expenses for participation in the fellowship are covered by the program. At times the program will also cover the cost of "media-related activities and conferences."

== Awards ==
=== Aspen Prize for Community College Excellence ===
Community Colleges which succeed in attaining exceptional results for all students during their time in college and as postgraduates are awarded the Aspen Prize for Community College Excellence.

Recipients to date include:

- 2025 Southwest Wisconsin Technical College
- 2023 Amarillo College
- 2023 Imperial Valley College
- 2021 San Antonio College
- 2019 Indian River State College
- 2019 Miami Dade College
- 2017 Lake Area Technical College
- 2015 Santa Fe College
- 2013 Santa Barbara City College
- 2013 Walla Walla Community College
- 2011 Valencia College

=== Aspen Institute Faculty Pioneers and Dissertation Proposal Award ===
The Financial Times called the Faculty Pioneers and Dissertation Proposal Awards the "Oscars of the business school world". These honor business school instructors with an outstanding track record of leadership and risk-taking in ensuring that the MBA curriculum incorporates social, environmental and ethical issues.

Recipients in the Category "Lifetime Achievement" include:

- 2010 James E. Post, John F. Smith, Jr. Professor in Management at the School of Management at Boston University
- 2010 David Vogel, Solomon P. Lee Professor of Business Ethics at Haas School of Business, University of California at Berkeley

=== Henry Crown Leadership Award ===
This annual award was created to honor an outstanding leader whose achievements reflect the high standards of honor, integrity, industry, and philanthropy that characterized the life and career of industrialist and philanthropist Henry Crown. Notable recipients include:

- 2021 Francis S. Collins, M.D., Ph.D., Director of the National Institutes of Health
- 2015 General (ret.) Stanley McChrystal, former Commander of the International Security Assistance Force and Commander of United States Forces Afghanistan
- 2014 Reed Hastings, Founder and CEO, Netflix
- 2013 Wynton Marsalis, Managing and Artistic Director, Jazz at Lincoln Center
- 2012 Gabrielle Giffords, former U.S. Representative
- 2011 Madeleine K. Albright, Chair, The Albright Stonebridge Group and former United States Secretary of State
- 2010 Vartan Gregorian, President, Carnegie Corporation of New York
- 2009 Jeffrey Bezos, President, CEO, and Chairman of the Board of Amazon.com
- 2006 Condoleezza Rice, former United States Secretary of State
- 2003 Patty Stonesifer, Co-Chair and President of the Bill and Melinda Gates Foundation
- 2002 Jimmy Carter, thirty-ninth president of the United States
- 1999 Gen. Colin L. Powell, USA (Ret.), founding chairman of America’s Promise – The Alliance for Youth and former U.S. Secretary of State

The full list of laureates appears on the Award's web page.

== See also ==
- Aspen Review Central Europe
- Aspen Summer Words
- Aspen Strategy Group
- Aristotelianism
- Educational perennialism
