= Resurrection (American TV series) =

2012 American TV series

- Genre: Fantasy; Science fiction; Supernatural; Drama
- Based on: The Returned by Jason Mott
- Developed by: Aaron Zelman
- Starring: Omar Epps; Frances Fisher; Matt Craven; Devin Kelley; Mark Hildreth; Samaire Armstrong; Sam Hazeldine; Landon Gimenez; Kurtwood Smith
- Composers: Blake Neely; Pieter A. Schlosser
- Country of origin: United States
- Original language: English
- No. of seasons: 2
- No. of episodes: 21

Production
- Executive producers: Aaron Zelman; Dede Gardner; Jeremy Kleiner; JoAnn Alfano; Jon Liebman; Michele Fazekas; Tara Butters
- Production location: Norcross, Georgia
- Cinematography: Jeff Jur; Terry Stacey
- Editor: Christopher Cooke
- Running time: 42–44 minutes
- Production companies: ABC Studios; Brillstein Entertainment Partners; Plan B Entertainment; FTP Productions

Original release
- Network: ABC
- Release: March 9, 2014 – January 25, 2015

Resurrection is an American fantasy drama television series that aired from March 9, 2014, to January 25, 2015, on ABC. It is based on Jason Mott's 2013 novel The Returned, and is centered on a town in which dead people come back to life. It was co-produced by ABC Studios and Plan B Entertainment, led by Brad Pitt, Aaron Zelman, JoAnn Alfano, Jon Liebman, Dede Gardner, Jeremy Kleiner, Michele Fazekas, and Tara Butters.

On May 7, 2015, ABC cancelled the series after two seasons.

== Premise ==
The series follows the residents of Arcadia, Missouri, whose lives are upended when their loved ones return from the dead, unaged since their deaths. Among the returned is Jacob Langston (Landon Gimenez), an eight-year-old boy who drowned in 1982. Having been found alive in China, Jacob is brought back to the United States and an immigration agent named J. Martin ("Marty") Bellamy (Omar Epps), defies orders and returns Jacob to his parents, Henry (Kurtwood Smith) and Lucille (Frances Fisher). Jacob's surprise return inspires his uncle, Arcadia Sheriff Fred Langston (Matt Craven), and Fred's daughter Dr. Maggie Langston (Devin Kelley), whose wife/mother drowned while allegedly trying to rescue the boy, to learn more about this mystery. Caleb Richards (Sam Hazeldine), the father of Maggie's best friend Elaine Richards (Samaire Armstrong), becomes the second Arcadia resident to return, and he warns that there are many more to follow.

== Cast and characters ==
=== Main ===
- Omar Epps as Immigration and Customs Agent J. Martin "Marty" Bellamy / Robert Thompson
- Frances Fisher as Lucille Langston, Jacob's mother
- Matt Craven as Sheriff Fred Langston, Jacob's uncle
- Devin Kelley as Dr. Maggie Langston, Jacob's cousin and Fred's daughter
- Mark Hildreth as Pastor Thomas "Tom" Hale
- Samaire Armstrong as Elaine Richards, Maggie's best friend
- Sam Hazeldine as Caleb Richards (season 1, recurring season 2), Elaine's father
- Landon Gimenez as Jacob Langston
- Kurtwood Smith as Henry Langston, Jacob's father

=== Recurring ===
- Kathleen Munroe as Rachael Braidwood
- Kevin Sizemore as Gary Humphrey
- James Tupper as Dr. Eric Ward
- Tamlyn Tomita as Dr. Toni Willis
- Travis Young as Ray Richards
- Veronica Cartwright as Helen Edgerton
- Lori Beth Sikes as Janine Hale
- April Billingsley as Barbara Langston
- Ned Bellamy as Sam Catlin
- Jwaundace Candece as Mrs. Camille Thompson
- Shawn Shepard as Mr. Wallace Thompson
- Nadej Bailey as Jenny Thompson
- Christopher Berry as Deputy Carl Enders
- Glenn Fleshler as Mikey Enders (season 2)
- Michelle Fairley as Margaret Langston (season 2)
- Donna Murphy as Elegant Woman/Angela Forrester (season 2)
- Kyle Secor as Brian Addison (season 2)
- T.J. Linnard as William Kirk (season 2)
- Jim Parrack as Preacher James Goodman (season 2)

== Episodes ==
Season	Episodes	Originally released		Rank	Average viewers (in millions)
Season	Episodes	First released	Last released	Rank	Average viewers (in millions)
1	8	March 9, 2014	May 4, 2014	11	12.96
2	13	September 28, 2014	January 25, 2015	81	6.93

=== Season 1 (2014) ===
No. overall	No. in season	Title	Directed by	Written by	Original release date	U.S. viewers (millions)
1	1	"The Returned"	Charles McDougall	Aaron Zelman	March 9, 2014	13.90
Immigration Agent J. Martin Bellamy is assigned to track down the parents of an 8-year-old boy named Jacob Langston, who wakes up in a rice field somewhere in China. When Bellamy learns from Jacob where he is from, the two head for Arcadia, Missouri, where — to Bellamy's shock — it is revealed that Jacob's parents, Lucille and Henry, are now in their 60s, and they tell Bellamy that Jacob died and was entombed 32 years ago, after he drowned. This discovery has everyone involved asking questions about Jacob's sudden return, and the mystery gets deeper when another person who was presumed dead suddenly turns up alive.
2	2	"Unearth"	Dan Attias	Thomas Schnauz	March 16, 2014	11.25
Caleb Richards returns to his family, supposedly with no memory of dying from a heart attack many years before. His son, Ray, and daughter, Elaine, are emotionally divided over his return, and Caleb resumes his devious activity from before his death. The Langstons must find a way to re-introduce Jacob to society – either by telling the truth or lying — and ask Pastor Tom for help, since he was friends with Jacob 32 years before. Meanwhile, Sheriff Langston is told his wife was having an affair, and, according to Jacob, the man was trying to save her from drowning at the time of her death. Asked to exhume Jacob's supposedly dead body, along with his wife's, the sheriff would rather keep the past buried.
3	3	"Two Rivers"	Kevin Dowling	Nicki Paluga	March 23, 2014	9.51
Jacob's grave is exhumed and his body is inside. Henry struggles with accepting Jacob as any form of his son. Meanwhile, Bellamy and Maggie search the river for a connection between Jacob and Caleb's deaths. They discover that Caleb, before he died, robbed the bank where his daughter Elaine currently works. Pastor Tom's decision to support Jacob's reappearance at church functions puts him at odds with the church board. He then finds another person returned from the dead in his sanctuary.
4	4	"Us Against the World"	Ron Underwood	Nathaniel Halpern	March 30, 2014	8.39
Tom's ex-fiancée, Rachael, who committed suicide 12 years ago, has returned. He is conflicted between his current marriage to Janine, and seeing Rachael again. Bellamy and Sheriff Langston investigate Caleb's involvement in a previous bank robbery, while the bank gets robbed again and he disappears. Lucille begins to empathize with Henry regarding Jacob. Maggie takes Jacob for ice cream and he senses Caleb is hiding out in an abandoned Langston family-owned factory. Upon arrest, Caleb vows that events are "just beginning," making Bellamy more concerned about what will happen next.
5	5	"Insomnia"	Christopher Misiano	Michele Fazekas & Tara Butters	April 6, 2014	8.05
The search begins for the money Caleb hid, before every federal government agency arrives in Arcadia as he was (and is, to the authorities) already dead. Elaine talks with him and finds clues leading her to find the money he stole for her to use. She tells Bellamy to give the money back to him. While doing this, Bellamy learns about other deaths and other kids, including one from Bellamy's past involving a child he returned to his troubled family in Chicago, only to be shot and killed by his father. Maggie discovers that Rachael is pregnant; Rachael begs her not to tell Tom. Caleb disappears from his locked cell and Bellamy knows it has something to do with Jacob's nightmare about Caleb and him disappearing.
6	6	"Home"	Scott Winant	Jessica Mecklenburg	April 13, 2014	7.46
The disappearance of Caleb has Bellamy and Sheriff Langston on edge, and to make matters worse, the residents of Arcadia are now looking into taking the situation into their own hands. Maggie calls in a friend, Dr. Ward, from the National Institute of Health to help out with the cases, believing that he can help Jacob despite Bellamy's distrust of federal agencies. Enticed with a chance to go to Maryland with Jacob, Henry and Lucille reject the offer. Rachael tells Tom that she's pregnant, and the news causes Janine, who had been trying to have a child, to become more upset. Helen Edgerton, a member of the church, exposes the truth to the congregation when it is revealed that Tom is the father. The exposure does not stop others, when Rachael is taken by force by the deputy and a cousin of Caleb's victims.
7	7	"Schemes of the Devil"	Dan Attias	Nathan Louis Jackson	April 27, 2014	7.85
Dr. Ward discovers that cells taken from Jacob's and Rachael's blood samples can possibly cure leukemia. After Rachael threatens Gary Humphrey in a cabin saying she cannot die, she is shot in a struggle with him when the sheriff, Bellamy, and Tom arrive. She dies in Tom's arms. At the playground, Jacob befriends a girl named Jenny, who is dressed in 1930s-style clothing. He later leaves the house on his bicycle, and his parents find him at the playground. Jenny's parents come out of the woods hungry. Like Jacob, she and her parents have returned from the dead. At the sheriff's office, numerous calls and appearances from others who have returned occur. Hopeful, the sheriff rushes home expecting to find his wife Barbara. However, Maggie finds her mother at Sam Catlin's house. Bellamy finds Rachael alive and walking down a rural road.
8	8	"Torn Apart"	Dan Attias	Aaron Zelman	May 4, 2014	8.16
The alive-again Rachael views her own corpse on a slab in the morgue, but states she is still the same person she was before Gary shot her. When Barbara tells Sheriff Langston that she is staying with Sam Catlin, he changes his mind about the resurrected and traps the couple hundred people who have returned, including Barbara, in the Arcadia High School gym. His plan backfires and Maggie gets arrested for failing to follow an order issued by a sergeant detailed to detain the returnees. Her father promises her that he will make everything right. Meanwhile, Bellamy tries to help Jenny's family out after realizing what the sheriff's plans entailed. Jenny's mother tells the Langstons that she and her husband are looking for their son, who has a crescent birthmark on the back of his neck, in the hope that he has also returned. Bellamy and Jacob attempt to leave Arcadia for Jacob's safety. As they are stopped by government forces, it is revealed that Bellamy has the crescent birthmark that Jenny's mother described.

=== Season 2 (2014–15) ===
No. overall	No. in season	Title	Directed by	Written by	Original release date	U.S. viewers (millions)
9	1	"Revelation"	Christopher Misiano	Aaron Zelman	September 28, 2014	8.38
Bellamy suddenly wakes up in a field near town. He has vague memories of being interrogated by a mysterious woman. When he gets back to town he learns that a week has passed. The soldiers have departed and have taken most of the Returned with them to an undisclosed location, and the news media has dismissed the whole event as mass hysteria. Sheriff Langston is back on the job but his drinking is getting out of control. Jacob goes to his tomb at night and finds his grandmother Margaret (Henry and Fred's mother) standing there. Henry brings her up to date and says that Fred will probably have a hard time accepting her. Rachael gets an ultrasound on her baby. She learns that it is a boy, and is apparently a couple months older than she thought. Bellamy is called to Chicago to meet with his supervisor. While there he is cornered by the mysterious woman, who says Bellamy can be her eyes and ears in Arcadia, or he can join the rest of the Returned in seclusion. Bellamy then remembers that he was shot through the heart during the interrogation. Fred contemplates suicide but his mother stops him.
10	2	"Echoes"	Dan Lerner	Stephanie Sengupta & Nicki Paluga	October 5, 2014	6.74
The mysterious woman tells Bellamy that he must track all future Returned and report to her. He and Sheriff Langston check out Caleb's hunting shack after hearing reports of someone possibly living in it, although Elaine is certain he hasn't returned and Jacob has only sensed his grandmother. A man named Arthur Holmes later shows up there. He is a Returned who died in 1935. He differs from others, in that he is ill, whereas the rest are completely healthy. Holmes remembers a fire. Meanwhile, Tom decides to protect Rachael, after seeing her sonogram, and resigns as church pastor. His ex-wife, Janine, suggests he start his own church. Janine also decides to return home. Bellamy gets Jacob to admit that he knows Bellamy is a Returned, and they agree to keep it a secret. Henry takes Margaret to the Langston factory. Devastated, she blames him for giving up and letting it go to ruin. She later returns alone and, inside, digs up the floor to reveal a lot of buried human bones.
11	3	"Multiple"	Ron Underwood	Tony Basgallop & Nathan Louis Jackson	October 12, 2014	5.55
Tom begins to perform a baptism on his new church members, one of whom soon finds a skull in the riverbed nearby. Sheriff Langston is alerted, and asks the coroner to involve Maggie. She arrives on scene and discerns that the remains are those of six bodies, only the six are two sets of three different people. She surmises that Jacob was not the first Returned. These bones date back at least 40 years. She also added that the remains came from elsewhere. The sheriff sets out upstream to look for a dumpsite. Bellamy, believing he is a Returned, asks advice from Tom, who suggests that he find his body. Bellamy dupes those he reports to into believing he has a Returned, by offering himself. The mysterious woman says that, if he gives solid evidence, he can view his body. The sheriff has recognized a bit of cloth found at a bridge and goes to the factory, where he finds another small bone. While studying the remains at her clinic, Maggie believes they are those of murder victims and calls her father. She shows Bellamy three femur bones that have an identical gash on them, suggesting the person returned twice and was killed again each time. As they discuss the bones, a team arrives to take them away, having been reported by Bellamy. He is shocked when shown his body in a bag. Carl, the Sheriff's Deputy, is tired of being bullied and put down by his obnoxious Returned brother, Mikey, and finally shoots him dead. Almost immediately after he buries the body in the basement, Mikey comes back home.
12	4	"Old Scars"	John Stuart Scott	Pat Charles & Nathaniel Halpern	October 19, 2014	5.07
In 1935, a man wearing a leg brace is lynched by a crowd, which includes Margaret when she was younger. In the present, Margaret suggests that it is time for Jacob to return to school. His parents think it is too soon, but Jacob says he is ready. Rachael collapses in the grocery store and is taken to Maggie's clinic for examination. She is told that her baby is growing at twice the normal rate. Janine tells Tom that, given the circumstances, Rachael is welcome to stay in their home. Margaret decides to get the whole family together for dinner. Jacob insists that Barbara be included. Margaret goes to Fred and makes him promise to come, and Henry reaches out to Barbara. Bellamy knows from Maggie's analysis that two of the sets of bones belong to a black man and a man who would have walked with a limp. Bellamy searches old microfiche newspaper records for stories about the Langston factory. He finds a story about a trucking accident with a photo that includes a man with a leg brace and Arthur Holmes. At Margaret's dinner, the wine flows freely and many accusations are made. Deputy Carl is in an accident and it is shown that many Returned have the cough Holmes had. Margaret tells Jacob a story about how she found out how to kill the Returned for good.
13	5	"Will"	Stephen Cragg	Michele Fazekas & Tara Butters	October 26, 2014	4.36
Fred shows Bellamy the bone he found under the factory, and they deduce that Margaret dumped the bones in the river. Bellamy theorizes that a fire killed the workers, not a truck accident, while Fred suggests that maybe 80-year-old secrets should remain buried. Several of the Returned are coming down with a virus, including Mikey, Deputy Carl's brother. Maggie tells Carl that without antivirals, his brother may die and vanish as Holmes did, which gives Carl an idea. Maggie discovers that Bellamy is the link to the government, and asks him to use his connection to see what they know about the cough. Bellamy calls the mysterious woman, but she offers no help. Carl withholds the antivirals from his brother, who says while dying, "I don't want to be here," and then vanishes. Elaine and Maggie talk to Barbara over drinks and even though Maggie finds it odd that her mother is about her same age, she likes her as a person. Barbara and Fred get back together, which upsets Margaret, and Margaret later asks Barbara to walk with her. Barbara tells Margaret that she is carrying a great deal of guilt and feels the hatred of her friends and family. Margaret says she knows why they returned, which is to pay for their sins. She tells Barbara that if she chooses to stop living, she will vanish and not return. She does so, which is witnessed by Elaine. Elaine tells Maggie and they see that Barbara's blood sample has vanished as well. Rachael and Bellamy also contract the virus.
14	6	"Afflictions"	Christopher Misiano	Stephanie Sengupta	November 2, 2014	4.99
In a flashback, the government woman is shown sitting in the wreckage of a plane crash when she was younger. Bellamy meets with the government woman to find out more about the virus he has. He is given a drug that eases the symptoms and delays the effect of the virus, but learns there is no cure. The woman notices the crescent birthmark on Bellamy's neck, and remembers watching the interview of Camille Thompson. The woman says she is a statistician who is looking for patterns that might explain the Returned. Later, Bellamy is rummaging through the woman's office, and sees a note where she has identified him as Robert Thompson, an infant who died in the Arcadia flood in 1934, then returned in Chicago in 1972. (A sign on the office door identifies the government woman as Angela Forrester.) Bellamy then meets with his sister, Jenny Thompson, at the government compound, having heard that their Returned parents caught the virus and vanished. Maggie tells Fred about Elaine seeing Barbara vanish. She confronts Margaret, who denies she was there and says that Elaine must be mistaken. Fred visits Elaine, and says he believes she saw what she saw. Meanwhile, Elaine's brother Ray has organized a separatist movement for the "true living", and they are meeting at the restaurant to discuss how to handle the problem of the Returned. Bellamy is released from the compound with a 10-day supply of the drug. Before leaving he hides his cell phone in a drawer and later tries to determine its location. He gives some of the drug to Maggie to use as she feels appropriate. Elsewhere, Henry brings Jacob to the furniture factory and discusses plans to restore it. There he meets a man named Brian Addison who is interested in buying the property, but Henry says it is not for sale. Brian then asks if Henry needs an investor, and gives him a card. After Henry calls the man later, Brian shares the news with a younger Returned man he calls "Grandpa". "Grandpa" smiles and says some hateful things about the Langstons.
15	7	"Miracles"	Colin Bucksey	Tony Basgallop	November 9, 2014	4.58
Rachael dreams about the man known as "Grandpa" being trapped in the factory fire. Margaret wakes up abruptly, apparently having had the same dream. Brian meets with the Langstons to discuss his factory investment, and Margaret offers to have dinner with Brian. Ray meets Deputy Carl at the restaurant, and tells him about the True Living. Ray discusses the group's concerns that the Returned will outnumber the other citizens of Arcadia by next year. Carl attends the next meeting and tells the story about Mikey, firing up the group. At the end of the meeting, Carl notices that Ray has mysteriously caught the virus that the Returned have. At the hospital, Marty and Maggie offer the drug to Rachael, who appears to be getting worse, but they admit they don't know what effect the drug will have on the baby. Later, Tom tries to convince Rachael to take the drug, but after time to think, Rachael refuses. Maggie confronts Marty, asking how he is so sure that the drug will work, and Marty finally tells her that he is a Returned. Janine is strangely at peace with Rachael's decision and refers to the baby as "ours". Margaret returns from dinner with Brian to his home. While Brian is out of the room, Margaret sees an old photo of Grandpa in a frame, recognizing him as the man in the fire from her dream. She tells Brian she has to go, and abruptly leaves. Grandpa emerges from another room, and chastises Brian for bringing Margaret to the house. Back at the hospital, Rachael has made a miraculous recovery. Later, Margaret pays her a visit.
16	8	"Forsaken"	Constantine Makris	Nicki Paluga	November 30, 2014	3.66
Margaret goes through some old photos with Jacob, and finds one of the men who died in the factory fire that identifies him as William Kirk. She visits Brian again, tells him the deal is off, and warns him to stay away from her family. Henry is disappointed, and later visits Brian's home and meets William, unaware of what Margaret knows. William tells Henry he used to work at the factory, after which Henry offers him a job getting the place ready for production and re-initiates the deal with Brian. The anti-Returned hate is escalating and several citizens of Arcadia, fearing for the safety of their families, relinquish their claims and dump their returned family members in Pastor Tom's church. Marty and Fred visit a small group of the True Living in the restaurant to find out their plans and issue a warning, with an angry Marty announcing to anyone within earshot that he is a Returned. A concerned Elaine visits Ray in the hospital, and she is later joined by Fred. Maggie theorizes that Rachael's baby is the reason she recovered, and strongly believes the stem cells in Rachael's amniotic fluid can cure others suffering from the virus. Rachael agrees to have some fluid extracted, which has Janine concerned. Maggie injects Ray with the stem cells and Ray says if he dies he wants to stay dead, stating that whoever returns in his body won't really be him. After Rachael returns home, Janine lies to her that Tom wants her taken to Janine's sister's house for protection until the True Living threat blows over. Tom later finds his house empty. Concerned after skimming through Janine's baby diary, he calls Janine, who says she has taken Rachael to her own OBGYN in a neighboring town. Tom returns to the church where Marty is providing assistance to the many Returned there. Rachael calls Tom using Janine's phone and reveals Janine's lie. Tom tells Rachael that he is in love with her, and instructs her to be quiet until he comes to get her. Tom tells Marty he has to leave, just as a tear gas canister is thrown through a church window. Marty assists the Returned in escaping through the front door, while Tom leaves out the back. A pickup truck peels away from the scene and strikes Tom, killing him. Deputy Carl gets out to view what he has done, then flees in his truck.
17	9	"Aftermath"	Kevin Dowling	Steve Cwik	December 7, 2014	3.98
Ray recovers due to the stem cells. Maggie and Marty realize that they need to obtain more fluid but they don't know where Rachael is. Marty's supply of the government drug has run out and he is again showing symptoms of the virus. Henry, Lucille and Margaret disagree about how to tell Jacob of Tom's death, but Jacob overhears their conversation through the air vents. Henry tells Margaret that the factory deal is on again. Margaret goes to Fred and tells him to intervene in the deal because it is fraudulent. Janine has been drugging Rachael to keep her asleep. Janine is told about Tom's death, and, when Rachael wakes up, shares the news with her. Rachael discovers that Janine has locked the doors and is holding her there. Later, she knocks Janine out and leaves. Fred gives Henry back his check and tells him that Brian had planned to skip town with the money as revenge for his grandfather. He also tells Henry that Margaret has been lying, and, if he doesn't believe it, to ask her what happened to Barbara. Maggie and Marty remember that the government has Rachael's former body at their compound, and the fluid in it would still be usable. They ask Angela Forrester to get them a sample. She tries but is overruled by her superior, who wants "nature to take its course" (let the Returned die). Marty is told that there is no more of the drug and that he cannot see Jenny for fear of passing the virus. Henry confronts Margaret about the factory fire, and she admits that 12 people were allowed to die in a locked varnish room to keep the fire from spreading and ruining the whole factory. She also admits to helping Barbara disappear. Henry tells Margaret to leave, saying she has been "dead for decades." As Maggie and Marty leave the compound, Maggie finds that samples of the anti-viral drug have been slipped into her purse, buying Marty more time. Fred determines that Carl is the culprit in Tom's hit-and-run death and arrests him. Henry, Lucille, and Jacob attend a vigil for Tom at the church. The True Living arrive and want to start trouble. One of them throws Henry to the ground. Margaret arrives and stands next to Jacob, who surveys the scene and tells her that he feels he is putting his parents in danger and therefore it is time to leave. They leave together, and Lucille desperately tries to find Jacob.
18	10	"Prophecy"	Christopher Misiano	Aaron Zelman	January 4, 2015	4.10
A storm hits Arcadia, and a mysterious stranger emerges, disheveled, from the woods. Stumbling into Elaine's restaurant, she helps him out of his bloodied shirt, and sees a strange tree pattern on his back. Henry, Fred and Marty search for Jacob, insisting that Lucille stay home though she badly wants to go out and look for her son. Lucille confides in Maggie that she still feels responsible for Jacob's drowning, having fallen asleep with him on that fateful day, and says she cannot bear to lose him again. Margaret has taken Jacob to an old barn, and flashbacks show her as a young woman in this same barn, sitting and weeping while dressed in her wedding gown. She tells Jacob about how she was forced to marry Mr. Langston against her will, but did so to protect her father, a troubled foreman at the furniture factory. Henry and Fred arrive and distract Margaret, allowing Marty take Jacob away. Margaret admits to telling Barbara how to "let herself go" and disappear, having witnessed one of the fire victims doing this before being executed for the fourth time. She says she planned to help Jacob disappear, but he ultimately wanted to go back to his parents. She also tells them the truth about their father and how she hates the Langston traits in her two sons. Maggie tells Marty she has finished the development of the stem cell serum, and that he can now be completely cured of the virus. Marty then calls in a favor to the government and is reunited with his sister, Jenny. At the restaurant, Jenny sees the mysterious stranger, and recognizes him as "Preacher James" from the 1930s. Henry and Lucille have an argument and they decide it would be best if he left home for a while. Marty goes to a bare patch of land with a crescent shape in the woods. From the ground, cicadas emerge and morph into a flock that creates a tree shape in the air. James walks up and tells Marty he died while trying to rescue him from the flood. He suggests to Marty that the full story of the Returned has yet to be told.
19	11	"True Believer"	Vincent Misiano	Pat Charles	January 11, 2015	3.10
After hearing a story from Jenny about how Preacher James healed people and brought the dead to life back in the 1930s, Marty becomes convinced that James was a con man. This appears to be confirmed when James holds an assembly and returns a "dead" husband to his wife, even though both he and Marty saw the confused man walking in the woods a bit earlier. Margaret goes to the government center where the unclaimed Returned are being held. People recognize her and appear to fear her. A government agent confronts Margaret, wondering why she is choosing to stay there. Rachael arrives in Maggie's office having contractions, and tells the story of how she had to escape from Janine. Maggie says they are Braxton-Hicks contractions, but does believe that Rachael's baby could arrive any day. Rachael visits Tom's grave with Elaine. Henry is staying with Fred while he and Lucille are having their troubles. He calls Lucille and they arrange a meeting at a restaurant to talk. While Lucille is waiting, her watch stops. Marty awakes from a nap at the station and sees what turns out to be a vision of Henry. After telling Fred, they run out and find Henry slumped at the wheel of his truck, dead from a heart attack. Lucille is devastated, as is Margaret when Fred calls her with the news. Lucille wants Preacher James to try to bring Henry back, as he did with the other man, but James says he can only do so with Marty's help. Marty is still skeptical, but he goes with James and Fred out to a field, where James has dug a shallow grave. James insists they must kill him right there so he can get Henry and bring him back. Marty refuses, but Fred quickly shoots and kills James. The next day, James shows up at the Langstons' door with an alive Henry, who is embraced by Lucille and Jacob. James tells Marty that he was an evil man back in his day, but everything changed when he sacrificed himself to try to save the infant Robert from the flood. He believes he can now do much good, and confides in Marty that he heard the pleas of many other souls when he was rescuing Henry from the dead.
20	12	"Steal Away"	Félix Alcalá	Nathan Louis Jackson	January 18, 2015	3.29
While in a trance-like state, the Returned of Arcadia all take a morning walk into town, stopping in front of Twain's and looking toward an upstairs window revealed to be Rachael's room. As Rachael is shown having contractions, Fred fires his gun, snapping all the Returned out of their trance. Henry and Marty try to figure out what happened, and meet with Preacher James to discuss it. In conversation, Henry tells the story about Margaret making Barbara disappear, and James is taken aback. He wants to go to the government detainment center to talk to Margaret, while Marty wants to talk to Angela Forrester about the trance incident. At the center, Marty meets with Angela, who cannot explain the incident but does share news that her calculations project another large wave of the Returned. James talks to Margaret, then holds a service for the detainees that includes distributing communion wafers and wine. Marty and Angela are summoned to the room, and find all the Returned are dead, including James, having drunk poisoned wine. The detainees all return in Arcadia the next day, and James explains to Marty that the poisoning was the only way they could escape the center. James then tells Marty he believes Rachael's baby was conceived in death, and is therefore the "beast" or "anti-christ" mentioned in the Book of Revelation. If born, the child will be able to control all the Returned to do its bidding. Marty warns Maggie, who moves Rachael to Henry and Lucille's home. Margaret returns and talks to Jacob while he is outside. Jacob says that Rachael is in the home and in labor, and that it has caused him to feel pain. At the same time, Angela Forrester presses a button on her computer, completing the calculation of her projections, and she is horrified to see that the Returned will expand beyond Arcadia and will soon number in the millions.
21	13	"Loved in Return"	Dan Attias	Nathaniel Halpern	January 25, 2015	3.73
As Rachael prepares to give birth to her child, Marty and the Langston brothers take up arms to keep James and his flock of Returned, joined by the True Living, at bay while Lucille takes Jacob and Jenny out of danger. After Margaret steps in to warn Rachael about James' motive to take the baby, she is caught by Maggie and Lucille, but Margaret says she was there to warn Rachael and help Jacob, who feels the baby's pain. James then instructs the crowd to invade the Langston home, and they overpower Maggie, Marty, Fred and Henry. James goes up to talk to Rachael, trying to make her believe that Tom is waiting for them so she will disappear before the baby is born. Margaret, after managing to convince the captors to give her the gun, frees Marty, Maggie, Fred and Henry, and Marty stops James as he is coaching Rachael on how to let go. Marty tells her that James is not a man of the word, because God would not send him to kill a child, for none are born evil. Rachael finally gives birth to her son Nathaniel, and the next morning, Marty and the Langstons watch a television newscast that leads with news that millions around the world have Returned with no end in sight. In a flash forward to one year later, Marty, now in charge of the newly created Department of the Returned, tells a newly returned that her grandson has agreed to take her in, but because that she is a returned, she will face discrimination from all levels. Marty also makes his final visit to see a now jailed James, and uses real scriptures to remind James that what is actually written in the Bible cannot be twisted by anyone for evil. Later that evening, Marty and Maggie, who are now a couple, prepare to have dinner in the Langston home with Henry, Lucille, Fred, Jacob and Jenny. Elsewhere, Rachael sings a lullaby to Nathaniel and places him in his crib before she goes to bed. Moments later, a swarm of cicadas gather outside Nathaniel's bedroom window.

== Development and production ==
In January 2013, ABC ordered the project to pilot status and in March brought in Charles McDougall as director as part of a two-year deal he signed with ABC Studios. On March 7, 2013, ABC released its list of potential hour-long pilot pick-ups, with the title changed to Forever. The title changed again after ABC ordered it to series in May 2013.

On May 7, 2015, ABC announced that it had cancelled Resurrection after two seasons. The network cited low ratings as the reason for its cancellation. It was high-rated in its first season, but saw a big drop in ratings in its second season. Resurrection produced by ABC Studios was one of the biggest cancellations for ABC along with two other shows Cristela and the Ioan Gruffudd drama Forever.

== Reception ==
=== Critical response ===
Resurrection scored 59 out of 100 on review aggregator Metacritic based on 30 critics, indicating "mixed or average reviews". On Rotten Tomatoes, the first season holds a 50% score with an average rating of 5.7/10, based on 40 reviews. The website's critics consensus reads, "With too much melodrama and not enough finesse, Resurrection is dangerously close to DOA." The second season holds a score of 57% with an average rating of 7.0/10, based on seven reviews.

=== Ratings ===
==== Overall ====
Viewership and ratings per season of Resurrection
Season	Timeslot (ET)	Episodes	First aired		Last aired		TV season	Viewership rank	Avg. viewers (millions)
Season	Timeslot (ET)	Episodes	Date	Viewers (millions)	Date	Viewers (millions)	TV season	Viewership rank	Avg. viewers (millions)
1	Sunday 9:00 pm	8	March 9, 2014	13.90	May 4, 2014	8.16	2013–14	11	9.32
2	Sunday 9:00 pm	13	September 28, 2014	7.55	January 25, 2015	3.73	2014–15	81	4.73

==== Season 1 ====
Viewership and ratings per episode of Resurrection
No.	Title	Air date	Rating/share (18–49)	Viewers (millions)	DVR (18–49)	DVR viewers (millions)	Total (18–49)	Total viewers (millions)
1	"The Returned"	March 9, 2014	3.8/10	13.90	1.5	4.08	5.3	17.98
2	"Unearth"	March 16, 2014	3.1/8	11.25	1.5	4.28	4.6	15.53
3	"Two Rivers"	March 23, 2014	2.5/6	9.51	1.5	4.04	4.0	13.55
4	"Us Against the World"	March 30, 2014	2.4/6	8.39	1.1	3.46	3.5	11.86
5	"Insomnia"	April 6, 2014	2.2/5	8.05	1.4	3.58	3.6	11.63
6	"Home"	April 13, 2014	2.1/5	7.46	1.2	3.44	3.3	10.90
7	"Schemes of the Devil"	April 27, 2014	1.9/5	7.85	1.2	3.39	3.1	11.18
8	"Torn Apart"	May 4, 2014	2.1/6	8.16	1.0	2.93	3.1	11.09

==== Season 2 ====
Viewership and ratings per episode of Resurrection
No.	Title	Air date	Rating/share (18–49)	Viewers (millions)	DVR (18–49)	DVR viewers (millions)	Total (18–49)	Total viewers (millions)
1	"Revelation"	September 28, 2014	2.5/7	8.38	0.6	2.01	3.1	10.39
2	"Echoes"	October 5, 2014	2.0/5	6.74	0.7	2.05	2.7	8.79
3	"Multiple"	October 12, 2014	1.5/4	5.55	0.7	2.30	2.2	7.85
4	"Old Scars"	October 19, 2014	1.4/3	5.07	0.7	2.46	2.1	7.53
5	"Will"	October 26, 2014	1.2/3	4.36	0.8	2.39	2.0	6.75
6	"Afflictions"	November 2, 2014	1.4/3	4.99	0.9	2.61	2.3	7.60
7	"Miracles"	November 9, 2014	1.2/3	4.58	0.8	2.20	2.0	6.78
8	"Forsaken"	November 30, 2014	0.9/2	3.66	0.7	2.36	1.6	6.01
9	"Aftermath"	December 7, 2014	1.0/3	3.98	0.6	1.88	1.6	5.86
10	"Prophecy"	January 4, 2015	1.0/3	4.10	0.6	1.97	1.6	6.08
11	"True Believer"	January 11, 2015	0.8/2	3.10	0.7	2.15	1.5	5.25
12	"Steal Away"	January 18, 2015	0.8/2	3.29	0.6	2.12	1.4	5.41
13	"Loved in Return"	January 25, 2015	1.0/3	3.73	0.6	2.02	1.6	5.75

Resurrection : U.S. viewers per episode (millions)

Season	Episode number												
Season	1	2	3	4	5	6	7	8	9	10	11	12	13
1	13.90	11.25	9.51	8.39	8.05	7.46	7.85	8.16	–				
2	8.38	6.74	5.55	5.07	4.36	4.99	4.58	3.66	3.98	4.10	3.10	3.29	3.73

Audience measurement performed by Nielsen Media Research

== Broadcast ==
In Australia, the series premiered on March 25, 2014, on Seven Network. Its debut episode was the highest rating series premiere for two years in Australia, attracting an audience of 1.9 million mainland capital city viewers (beating previous record holder Revenge whose first episode reached 2.06 million viewers in 2012) and 2.82 million viewers nationally. It also topped all three key advertising demographics. The second season premiered on February 22, 2015, at the new time of 10:30 p.m. every Sunday. The second season premiered to 112,000 in a new time slot and consequently was the lowest ratings for the series. In New Zealand, it premiered on July 16, 2014, on TV2.

In Canada, the series was simsubbed on Citytv for the first season and CTV for subsequent seasons.

In Ireland, the series debuted in summer 2014 on RTÉ Two. In the United Kingdom, the show began airing on pay-TV channel, Watch on August 18, 2014. The second season premiered on March 19, 2015.

== Home media release ==
ABC and Walt Disney Studios Home Entertainment scheduled the release of the first season of Resurrection in DVD format for June 10, 2014. The two-disc set features all eight episodes and bonus features, such as "On Location in Georgia", "Resurrection: Building a Mystery", bloopers, and deleted scenes.

== See also ==
- They Came Back, a 2004 film with a similar premise
- Les Revenants, a 2012 French TV series with a similar premise
- The Returned, a 2015 American TV adaptation of Les Revenants
- Glitch, a 2015 Australian TV series with a similar premise
- Revival, a 2025 American TV series with a similar premise
