= Swept Under =

- Written by: Doug Barber; James Phillips
- Directed by: Michel Poulette
- Starring: Devin Kelley; Aaron Ashmore
- Music by: James Gelfand; Louise Tremblay
- Country of origin: Canada
- Original language: English

Production
- Producer: Jean Bureau
- Cinematography: Daniel Villeneuve
- Editor: Benjamin Duffield
- Running time: 90 minutes
- Production companies: Canal+; Incendo Productions

Original release
- Release: December 6, 2015

Swept Under is a 2015 Canadian thriller directed by Michel Poulette about a crime-scene cleaner, Morgan (Devin Kelley), who discovers evidence that has been left behind. With the help of novice detective Nick (Aaron Ashmore), they rush to find the killer's identity.

== Plot ==
Crime scene cleaner Morgan Sher has trouble keeping assistants because of the gruesome work. She also struggles in her personal life to make emotional connections with others. At a crime scene, she meets Nick Hopewell, the new partner of Detective Ed Braxton. Braxton does not get along with Sher, as his reputation was damaged after she helped solve a crime he could not. When her latest assistant quits after seeing the crime scene, Hopewell chats with her, and Sher impresses him with her insights into the murder. Sher later visits the police station to give Braxton a clue she found at the crime scene while cleaning. Upset that she seems to be trying to upstage him, Braxton ignores her.

After a one-night stand with a data entry worker, Sher encounters Hopewell again, who has become anxious to impress his captain and wants to know about the evidence she found. After Sher hands him the tip of a cane, Hopewell requests her assistance in examining a seemingly related case, angering Braxton. After a brief confrontation, Hopewell takes Braxton up on his ultimatum and partners with Sher instead, convincing her to take a role as a police consultant. In return, she demands Hopewell help her clean up crime scenes. As they grow closer, Hopewell flirts with her, only to be rebuffed by Sher, who says she has a policy against dating cops and coworkers.

Following clues left at the crime scenes, Hopewell realizes the cane may be connected in some way to Jean-Baptiste Lully, a French composer who died from gangrene after stabbing himself in the foot with a conducting staff. The killer left behind a compact disc containing Lully's "Marche pour la Cèrèmonie des Turcs." Hopewell researches the local orchestra and finds Gary Butler, a donor who was accused of attempted rape of a prostitute. Butler, when questioned, is nervous and denies the rape accusation, which he says was an extortion attempt. When Hopewell pushes him, Butler panics and leads them to Adam Fowler, a conductor. Hopewell reasons that a serial killer has targeted people with a criminal record who are connected to the orchestra. Butler and Fowler, though spooked, refuse to cooperate; Sher and Hopewell agree they are holding back information.

After cooking dinner for her, Hopewell convinces Sher to enter into a relationship, and she admits that personal issues in her life led her to have difficulty in starting healthy relationships. After they have sex, Sher sneaks out of Hopewell's house with his badge and return to Butler's house. Impersonating a police officer, she gains entry and flatly tells him she intends to kill him, revealing that she is a former rape victim as a runaway kidnapped by Fowler, Butler, and the other dead men. Before she kills him, Butler reluctantly assists her in arranging his own murder scene.

When Butler is found dead, Captain LaSalle angrily takes Hopewell off the case when she learns Hopewell suspected Butler may be the next victim. Knowing his job on the line, Hopewell again turns to Sher for help. After promising to help him, she murders Fowler and makes it look like a suicide, arranging the scene to give Hopewell enough evidence to close the case with Fowler revealed as the killer. Hopewell's job is saved, and Sher becomes hopeful that she can now move beyond the trauma of her rape and have a healthy relationship with Hopewell.

Her hopes are dashed when Butler's estranged wife reveals that she set up a hidden camera in their house to gather evidence of Butler's infidelity. The footage reveals a woman killed him, and Hopewell becomes suspicious of the case's too-perfect closure. As he zeroes in on Sher as a suspect, Hopewell, who previously cooperated with Internal Affairs to take down dirty cops in his precinct, struggles with his rigid morality. After finding her as she plans to flee the city, he pleads with Sher not to leave him. As Sher turns away, she apologizes, saying that she knew he would not be able to let her go.

== Cast ==
- Devin Kelley as Morgan Sher
- Aaron Ashmore as Nick Hopewell
- Stephen Bogaert as Adam Fowler
- Brett Ryan as Ed Braxton
- Joanne Boland as Captain LaSalle
- Vladimir Jon Cubrt as Gary Butler

== Production ==
Shooting took place in Montreal over sixteen days.

== Release ==
Swept Under was originally released under the title of Maid for Murder on the Lifetime Movie Network on December 12, 2015.

== Reception ==
Poulette was nominated for Outstanding Directorial Achievement in Movies for Television and Miniseries by the Directors Guild of Canada.
