= Maryanne Stevens =

American theologian and academic administrator

Maryanne Stevens RSM

7th President of the College of Saint Mary
- In office June 1, 1996 – June 30, 2023
- Succeeded by: Heather A. Smith

Personal details
- Born: 1947/1948 (age 77–78) Anchorage, Alaska, U.S.
- Education: Misericordia University; Saint Louis University; Boston College

Maryanne Stevens RSM (born 1947/1948) is an American theologian, academic administrator, and religious sister who is the president emerita of the College of Saint Mary. She was the seventh president from 1996 to 2023.

== Life ==
Stevens was born in 1947 or 1948 in Anchorage, Alaska to a military family. Her father was a member of the United States Air Force. She is the oldest of eight children. Her family moved to Riverside, California. During her sophomore year of high school, she relocated to Offutt Air Force Base. Stevens graduated from Mercy High School. Following graduation, she joined the Sisters of Mercy in 1966. She earned a bachelor's degree in mathematics and sociology from Misericordia University.

Stevens taught at a small Catholic high school in Missouri. She completed a master's degree in theology from Saint Louis University. Stevens earned a Ph.D. in religion and education from Boston College in 1987. Her dissertation was titled, Apocalyptic Literature "The Mother of Justice Education": A Design for the Use of the Book of Revelation in Religious Education. Mary C. Boys, Pierre D. Lambert, and Thomas E. Wangler served on her dissertation committee. Stevens joined the faculty at Creighton University in 1986. By 1996, she was the theology program chair. On June 1, 1996, she became the seventh president of the College of Saint Mary. She retired on June 30, 2023, and was named president emerita. She was succeeded by Heather A. Smith.

== See also ==
- Stevens, Maryanne, ed. (1993). Reconstructing the Christ Symbol: Essays in Feminist Christology. Paulist Press. ISBN 978-0-8091-3439-7.
