= Aspen Summer Words =

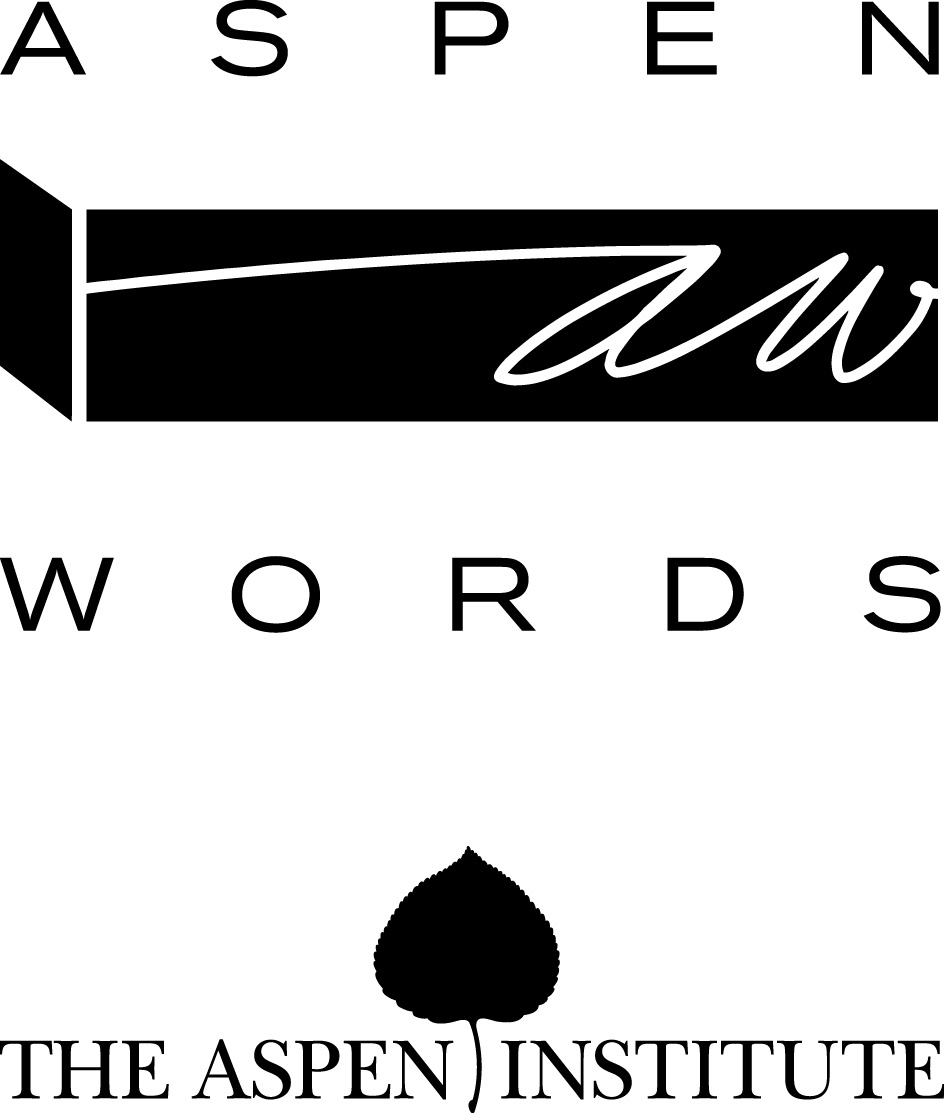
- Aspen Words, a program of the Aspen Institute
- Begins: June
- Frequency: Annual
- Locations: Aspen, Colorado, United States
- Founded: 1976
- Website: Aspen Words

Aspen Summer Words (ASW) is a festival of words, stories and ideas held each June in Aspen, Colorado. It is the flagship program of Aspen Words, a literary arts non-profit and program of the Aspen Institute. Until 2015, Aspen Words was known as the Aspen Writers' Foundation.

== History ==
For 40 years, Aspen Summer Words has hosted over 300 writers who have read, taught and performed for 20,000+ audience members and students. ASW literati have included an international cast of authors — Nobel Laureates, Pulitzer Prize winners, National Book Awardees, and many other notable and bestselling writers — who each year transform Aspen into the Rocky Mountain gateway to the literary world.

Established in 1976, Aspen Summer Words (ASW) is a festival of words, stories and ideas held each June in Aspen, Colorado. The six-day event celebrates authors in all their guises (novelists, poets, memoirists, journalists, songwriters, filmmakers, comedians, editors, literary agents, and more) during a jam-packed schedule of events designed to spark the imaginations of readers and writers alike.

The flagship program of the Aspen Words, ASW has been hailed as one of the nation's "Top Ten Literary Gatherings" (USA Today) and included in "The Best of Aspen" (5280 Magazine). O: The Oprah Magazine said, "Bringing new meaning to the idea of escaping into literature, Aspen Summer Words [takes] over the Colorado town, giving booklovers the chance to mingle with some of the biggest names in storytelling."

== Overview ==
ASW is one part laboratory and one part theater. Its two programs — the Writing Retreat and Literary Festival — approach the written word from different, yet complementary angles. The Retreat is designed for writing students, featuring introductory and intensive workshops with some of the nation's most notable faculty members; a literature appreciation course; and professional consultations with literary agents and editors. The Writing Retreat supports writers in developing their craft by providing a winning combination of inspiration, skills, community, and opportunity.

Each year workshops are held in a variety of genres including fiction, memoir, novel editing, and poetry.

== Writing retreat ==
There are two types of writing workshops:

- The five-day juried workshops are for students seeking intensive instruction and individualized critique to polish a manuscript they have in development. Daily writing exercises, reading assignments and discussion of student work are the basis for the classes. A manuscript submission is required for admission. Writing classes are limited to 12 students.
- The five-day non-juried workshops include workshops for writers of all levels who wish to get their feet wet in the world of writing.

== Literary festival/Public events ==
The literary festival consists of readings and conversations with the award-winning faculty and publishing experts of Aspen Summer Words. These events are open to workshop participants as well as to the general public. Topics include the craft of writing, the writing life, the business of writing, and many others. Between 2005 and 2013, each edition of the Literary Festival showcased the literary heritage of a new culture by using the stories and storytellers of a particular region, including The West, The American South, Ireland, India, Africa, and the Middle East, Latin America and the Caribbean.

== Consultations ==
Consultations are private meetings with guest editors and agents that offer the chance to pitch an idea, receive feedback on a manuscript and network with professionals from the top publishing houses and literary agencies in the country, including Simon & Schuster, Henry Holt & Co., Tin House, Carnicelli Literary Management, Penguin Random House, and other prestigious literary organizations.

== Aspen Prize For Literature ==
The Aspen Prize for Literature ceremony was a part of the Aspen Summer Words week until 2013. The annual Prize was presented by the Aspen Writers' Foundation to recognize outstanding achievement in literature and was established to encourage cultural, political, economic, spiritual, and intellectual change toward a world of great human kindness. Past recipients include Wole Soyinka, Ngugi wa Thiong'o, N. Scott Momaday, Paul Muldoon, Edna O'Brien, Salman Rushdie, Ron Carlson, Ernest Gaines, Colum McCann, Edwidge Danticat, and Luis Urrea.

== Past authors ==
2015

- Dani Shapiro
- Andre Dubus III
- Richard Russo
- Akhil Sharma
- Hannah Tinti
- Liz Van Hoose
- James Bohnen

2014

- Billy Collins
- Meg Wolitzer
- Meghan Daum
- Bernard Cooper
- Mary Beth Keane
- Melissa Bank
- Julia Glass
- Andre Dubus III

2012

- Erin Belieu
- Darrell Bourque
- Laura Fraser
- Francisco Goldman
- Derek Green
- Scott Lasser
- Andrew Sean Greer
- Randall Kenan
- William Loizeaux
- Benjamin Percy
- Mona Simpson
- Luis Alberto Urrea
- Daniel Alarcón
- Gioconda Belli
- Edwidge Danticat
- Orlando Patterson

2011

- Mona Eltahawy
- Nikky Finney
- Derek Green
- Erica Jong
- Randall Kenan
- Elinor Lipman
- Colum McCann
- Ron Rash
- Rabin Alameddine
- Reza Aslan
- Peter Cole
- Firoozeh Dumas
- Assaf Gavron
- Khaled Hosseini
- Daniyal Mueenuddin

2010

- Edward Carey
- Richard Bausch
- Dana Gioia
- Randall Kenan
- Scott Lasser
- William Loizeaux
- Elizabeth McCracken
- Dorothy Allison
- Nikky Finney
- Ernest Gaines
- Ron Rash
- Kathryn Stockett

2009

- Ron Carlson
- Pamela Painter
- Bill Loizeaux
- Chris Merrill
- Hallie Ephron
- Nic Pizzolatto
- Gary Ferguson
- Allison Berkley
- David Davidar
- Dana Gioia

2008

- Ishmael Beah
- Colum McCann
- David Davidar
- Dana Gioia
- Sue Miller
- Richard Buasch
- Pamela Painter
- Bill Loizeaux
- Robert Pinsky
- Nic Pizzolatto
- Doug Bauer
- Jan Greenburg
- Chimamanda Adichie

2007

- Robert Bausch
- Pam Houston
- Percival Everett
- Gary Ferguson
- Dorianne Laux
- Terry Curtis Fox
- Danzy Senna
- Bharti Kirchner

2006

- Amy Bloom
- Ron Carlson
- Pam Houston
- Ted Conover
- Christopher Merrill
- Laura Fraser

2005

- John Romano
- Gary Ferguson
- David Leite
- Robert Bausch
- Robert Boswell
- Elinor Lipman
- Joyce Maynard
- Marie Ponsot

2004

- Jan Greenburg
- Fentor Johnson
- Madeline Blais
- Ron Carlson
- Jane Hirsfield
- Elinor Lipman

2003

- Amy Bloom
- Ron Carlson
- James Houston
- Pam Houston
- Christopher Merrill
- David Peterson

2002

- Ted Conover
- Gretel Ehrlich
- Pam Houston
- Chip Kidd
- Scott Lasser
- Mary Jo Salter
- Mark Salzman
- Larry Watson

2001

- Madeleine Blais
- Peter Fromm
- Pam Houston
- Ted Conover
- Ursula Hegi
- Mark Salzman

2000

- Judith Barnard
- Chris Merrill
- Fenton
- Kent Haruf
- Pam Houston
- Rachel Jacobsohn
- Betsy Lerner
- Lois Lowry
- Skip Press
- Alex Amin

== See also ==
Literary festival
