= Chernobyl Diaries =

2012 horror film

- Theatrical release poster
- Directed by: Brad Parker
- Screenplay by: Oren Peli; Carey Van Dyke; Shane Van Dyke
- Story by: Oren Peli
- Produced by: Oren Peli; Brian Witten
- Starring: Jonathan Sadowski; Jesse McCartney; Devin Kelley; Olivia Taylor Dudley; Ingrid Bolsø Berdal; Nathan Phillips; Dimitri Diatchenko
- Cinematography: Morten Søborg
- Edited by: Stan Stalfas
- Music by: Diego Stocco
- Production company: Oren Peli/Brian Witten Pictures
- Distributed by: Alcon Entertainment (through Warner Bros. Pictures)
- Release date: May 25, 2012
- Running time: 86 minutes (Note: The UK version reportedly runs over two minutes longer.)
- Country: United States
- Language: English
- Budget: $1 million
- Box office: $37.2 million

Chernobyl Diaries is a 2012 American horror film co-written and produced by Oren Peli, and directed by Brad Parker, in his directorial debut. It stars Jonathan Sadowski, Jesse McCartney, Devin Kelley, Olivia Taylor Dudley, Ingrid Bolsø Berdal, Nathan Phillips, and Dimitri Diatchenko as a group of people who tour the abandoned Ukraine town of Pripyat, which was impacted by the Chernobyl disaster, and end up discovering a dangerous threat lurking. The film was shot on location, as well as in Hungary, and Serbia.

Chernobyl Diaries was theatrically released on May 25, 2012, by Alcon Entertainment through Warner Bros. Pictures. The film received generally negative reviews from critics and audience for its clichéd formula, characters, and special effects; some controversy was aimed towards the depiction of victims of the disaster. Despite this, it was a moderate box office success, grossing $37 million worldwide with a budget of $1 million.

== Plot ==
Chris, his girlfriend Natalie, and their mutual friend Amanda are vacationing across Europe. They stop in Kyiv, Ukraine, to visit Chris' brother, Paul, before heading to Moscow, Russia, where Chris intends to propose to Natalie.

Paul suggests they go for an extreme tour of Pripyat, an abandoned city located beside the Chernobyl Nuclear Power Plant, the site of the 1986 Chernobyl nuclear disaster. Chris is against going on the tour to stick to the original plan of going to Moscow, but Paul insists. They meet tour guide Uri, who agrees to take them to Pripyat alongside a backpacking couple, Norwegian Zoe and Australian Michael. After driving through Ukraine, they arrive at a Chernobyl Exclusion Zone checkpoint, where they are refused entry by the Ukrainian military. He then takes them to an alternate entry he discovered years ago.

The group stops at a river where Uri points out a large, mutated fish apparently able to live on land. The group worries about radiation poisoning, but Uri assures their safety with a Geiger counter. Uri leads them to the top floor of an abandoned apartment building, offering a view of the Chernobyl nuclear plant in the distance. After hearing noises at the other end of the apartment, the group encounter a bear that runs down the hallway past them without harming them.

As the group prepares to leave Pripyat, Uri discovers the spark plug wires in his van have been sabotaged. He tries to radio for help, but gets no response. As night falls, the group debates on whether to hike to a nearby checkpoint which is 12 miles away, or stay put until morning. Suddenly, strange noises are heard coming from outside in the darkness. Uri curiously ventures out with a loaded gun to investigate, while Chris follows. After multiple gunshots, Paul runs out to rescue Uri and Chris, only to return with an injured Chris, who claims that Uri has been taken. Wild dogs appear and claw at the doors of the van, so they decide to barricade themselves in their locked van for the night, tending to Chris' leg.

The next morning, Paul, Michael, and Amanda leave to search for Uri. They follow a trail of blood to an abandoned cafeteria and find Uri's mutilated body. They take his gun and are chased away by an unknown threat inside the building. Amanda checks her camera, and discovers that one of the pictures shows a humanoid creature present inside one of the apartment buildings. Natalie stays with the wounded Chris while the others begin their hike to the checkpoint. During the hike, Paul, Amanda, Michael, and Zoe find a vacant parking lot, where they gather spare parts for Uri's van, refusing to leave Natalie and Chris behind. The following night, the group return to the van only to find it upside down, and ripped to shreds. They find Natalie's video camera, showing footage of them being attacked, and captured by humanoid mutants. Paul, Amanda, Michael, and Zoe begin searching for the two deeper in the city, encountering a horde of mutants.

During their escape, a traumatized Natalie is found. When the group gets distracted by a mysterious young girl from the shadows, Natalie is dragged away. While fleeing through an underground passage way, Michael falls behind and is captured. As they continue on, they find Chris' engagement ring for Natalie on the ground, with Chris nowhere to be found. Climbing up a ladder, the mutants ambush and drag Zoe back down, forcing Amanda and Paul to leave her behind. The survivors then emerge from the passage next to the exposed nuclear reactor core. Paul recognizes that extremely high radiation levels are causing their skin to blister. Amanda and Paul encounter Ukrainian military forces outside the reactor building. Blinded by radiation, Paul stumbles toward the soldiers, who shoot him down for disobeying their direct order.

Amanda loses consciousness, and awakens on a gurney. Several doctors, in protective hazmat suits, inform her that she is in a hospital and they will help her. The doctors reveal that the "creatures" encountered in the exclusion zone were escaped asylum patients. After realizing Amanda "knows too much," she is forced into a dark cell to prevent her from exposing the story to the world. The recaptured patients swarm Amanda to eat her alive, as the doctor shuts the door viewer.

=== Alternate ending ===
An alternate ending for the film features Amanda being taken away by the soldiers after they kill Paul. She is later seen in a dark hospital room, inflicted with radiation poisoning (as evidenced by her missing hair), begging for help as the film cuts to black. Then credits start to roll.

== Cast ==
- Jonathan Sadowski as Paul
- Jesse McCartney as Chris
- Devin Kelley as Amanda
- Olivia Taylor Dudley as Natalie
- Ingrid Bolsø Berdal as Zoe
- Nathan Phillips as Michael
- Dimitri Diatchenko as Uri
- Miloš Timotijević as Ukrainian Check Point Guard
- Alex Feldman as Medic Goldshimdt
- Kristof Konrad as Medic Grotzky
- Pasha D. Lychnikoff as Doctor

== Release ==
=== Theatrical ===
In February 2012, Alcon Entertainment acquired distribution rights to Chernobyl Diaries in North America, Germany, Spain, and Japan, with Warner Bros. Pictures releasing the film on May 25, 2012, under its distribution deal with Alcon; FilmNation Entertainment sold rights to other international territories. It went on general release in the United Kingdom on June 22.

=== Home media ===
Chernobyl Diaries was released to DVD and Blu-ray on October 16, 2012, by Warner Home Video, in the United States. The UK DVD and Blu-ray release by StudioCanal followed on October 22, 2012. The UK release presents a longer version (about 2½ minutes) of the film than the American one.

== Reception ==
=== Critical response ===
On Rotten Tomatoes, the film has an approval rating of 18% based on 91 reviews and an average rating of 4.10/10. The website's critical consensus reads, "Despite an interesting premise and spooky atmospherics, Chernobyl Diaries is mostly short on suspense and originality". On Metacritic, the film has a score of 32 out of 100 based on reviews from 17 critics, indicating "generally unfavorable" reviews. Audiences polled by CinemaScore gave the film an average grade of "D+" on an A+ to F scale.

Critics at Spill.com praised the filmmakers' attempts to create a chilling atmosphere, but criticized the film's shallow characters, numerous clichés and failure to deliver even the most basic special effects. Joe Leydon's review in Variety stated, "Scattered stretches of suspense and a few undeniably potent shocks are not enough to dissipate the sense of deja vu that prevails." James Berardinelli wrote in ReelViews, "Chernobyl Diaries is afflicted with a fatal flaw that damages many horror films: after a better-than-average setup and a promising first half, everything falls apart." Mark Olsen, a critic from the Los Angeles Times, said: "The lack of suspense and surprise in this dispiritingly rote film becomes its own form of contamination". Andy Webster wrote in the New York Times, " Standard-issue genre accessories (dank stairways, flashlights, overcast skies, frosty windows) abound; shocks are mild and few." In his review for The Atlantic, Ian Buckwalter wrote "This is a standard-issue slasher movie without much slashing, substituting the Chernobyl-workers' ghost town of Pripyat for the likes of Friday the 13th's Camp Crystal Lake." Tim Robey's review in the London Daily Telegraph stated, "For a film with radioactive bears running around, it's often strangely dull." Peter Bradshaw's review in The Guardian wrote, "This jaunt into the Ukraine badlands from the Paranormal Activity people gets boring after a creepy start. Nigel Floyd wrote in his review for Time Out, "First-time director Bradley Parker makes decent use of the inherently eerie setting (locations in Belgrade and Budapest stand in for the real thing), but his disappointingly fright-free, cod-documentary approach is hampered by a sketchy script." Nick Schager's review in Slant wrote, "Chernobyl Diaries is little more than decomposed horror leftovers. No surprise given how these things usually go...With the cast’s performances as shrill as the fatality pecking order is predictable, it’s impossible to resist actively awaiting these ciphers’ demises, which take an unreasonably long time to begin occurring. Mark Kermode also gave the film a negative review, claiming that it has "a great idea hiding in there somewhere—shame they didn't find it.".

Mildly positive reviews notably include Frank Scheck from The Hollywood Reporter who said: "A basic monster movie that benefits greatly from its unique setting, Chernobyl Diaries again demonstrates Oren Peli's ability to wrest scares with minimal production values and a clever premise." Martyn Cotiero also gave the film some praise on the site Little White Lies, stating, "Doesn't set out to reinvent the horror wheel but succeeds as solid genre entertainment."

==== Other responses ====
Prior to film's release, the Friends of Chernobyl Centers, U.S., had said that the film's plot was insensitive to those who died and were injured in the disaster, and also it was sensationalizing events that had "tragic human consequences". In response, the producer, Oren Peli, said that his film was done with the utmost respect for the victims, and that the Israeli charity Chabad's Children of Chernobyl wrote him a letter expressing their "admiration" and "kudos" for his creation. Despite this claim, others described the film as a "plot-less mess of disaster porn", citing UK-based charity Chernobyl Children's Lifeline, who thought it was "disgusting".

== See also ==
- Cultural impact of the Chernobyl disaster
- List of films about nuclear issues
- List of Chernobyl-related articles
