= J. T. Ellison =

American writer

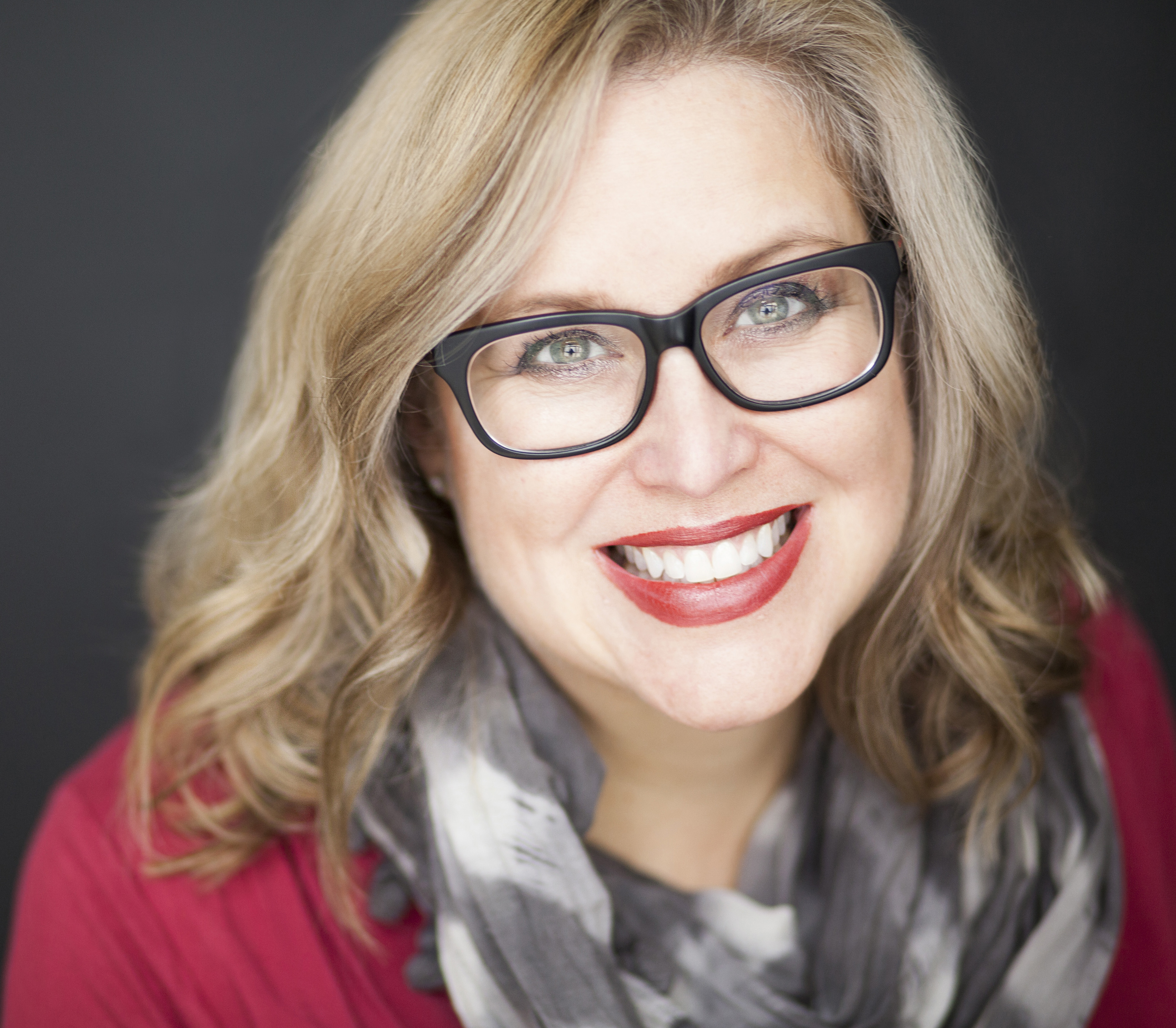
- Born: Orlando, Florida, U.S.
- Education: Randolph-Macon Woman's College, George Washington University
- Occupation: Author
- Spouse: Married
- Writing career
- Genres: Mystery, Thriller, Suspense
- Website: www.jtellison.com

J. T. Ellison is a New York Times bestselling American author. She writes domestic noir and psychological thrillers, the latter starring Nashville Homicide Lt. Taylor Jackson and medical examiner Dr. Samantha Owens. She also pens the "A Brit in the FBI" series with #1 New York Times bestselling author Catherine Coulter. With over a million books in print, Ellison's work has been published in twenty-eight countries and sixteen languages. She is also the co-host of the Emmy Award-winning television series, A Word on Words, which airs on Nashville Public Television. Ellison is also the founder of Two Tales Press, an independent publishing house, and The Wine Vixen, a wine review website. She lives with her husband in Nashville, Tennessee.

== Background ==
Ellison was born outside of Orlando, Florida and moved to rural Colorado when she was two, then to Washington, D.C. at the age of fourteen. She graduated from Randolph-Macon Woman's College with a double major in Politics and English Creative Writing and a minor in Economics, then received her master's degree from George Washington University's Graduate School of Political Management. Ellison was a presidential appointee and worked in The White House and the U.S. Department of Commerce before moving into the private sector to work as a financial analyst and marketing director for several defense and aerospace contractors.

== Writing career ==
When Ellison's college advisor told her that her writing wasn't good enough to be published, Ellison changed her plan to get a Master's of Fine Arts and, instead, went into politics. Eight years later, while living in Nashville, Ellison was recuperating from a back injury when she first read the PREY series by John Sandford and rediscovered her love of storytelling.

Ellison began to research her hidden passions: forensics and crime, and was compelled to begin writing down her stories. To research her books, she has worked with the Metro Nashville Police Department and the FBI, as well as performing autopsies and studying survivalists.

Ellison is perhaps best known for her Lt. Taylor Jackson series, which features Nashville homicide detective Taylor Jackson. Ellison successfully spun-off the series with Jackson's best friend, Medical Examiner Dr. Samantha Owens, as she begins her life in Washington, D.C. In 2012, Ellison teamed up with #1 New York Times bestselling author Catherine Coulter to co-write a new FBI series. The first book, The Final Cut, released in September 2013 and hit every major bestseller list. The series continues with The Lost Key, The End Game, The Devil's Triangle and The Sixth Day; the newest installment is The Last Second. Ellison published her first standalone novel, No One Knows, a Nashville-based domestic thriller, in 2016 with Gallery Books. and followed with a second standalone, Lie to Me, in 2017 with MIRA Books. Her third standalone, Tear Me Apart, released in 2018. Good Girls Lie in 2019, and Her Dark Lies in 2021. Her latest standalone, It's One Of Us, is set to release February 28, 2023.

She also has co-written with Erica Spindler and Alex Kava on two anthology collaborations: Slices of Night and Storm Season.

Ellison is a co-founder of Killer Year, an interactive society composed of 13 debut crime/mystery/suspense authors whose books were first published in 2007, creating an active online community and teaming authors with mentors from among the most established authors within the genre. The group was dedicated to furthering the writing, publishing and marketing goals of its members and the highly popular community involved readers, reviewers, and publishing professionals. A collection of short stories by the graduating class, including comments and contributions from seasoned vets such as Lee Child and Allison Brennan, was published to acclaim as Killer Year: Stories to Die For...From the Hottest New Crime Writers. Killer Year became the model for the International Thriller Writers debut author program, which Ellison helped develop.

Ellison also was one of the original members of, and a contributor to, the Anthony Award-nominated crime fiction blog, Murderati, which ran from 2006 to 2012 and is now an archive. She also contributed essays in volumes published by Mystery Writers of America and International Thriller Writers and regularly blogs about the writing business on The Tao of JT.

She also writes under the name Andrea Ellison overseas (France and Holland/Belgium)

Ellison is an active member of several professional writing organizations, including International Thriller Writers, Mystery Writers of America and Romance Writers of America.

Ellison's books have been published in: Argentina, Australia, Austria, Belgium, Chile, Denmark, Estonia, Finland, France, Germany, Holland, India, Indonesia, Italy, Japan, Mexico, Norway, Philippines, Poland, Spain, Sweden, Turkey, United Kingdom.

== Other ventures ==
In 2015, Ellison became the co-host of Nashville Public Television's premier literary television series A Word on Words. The show was hosted for more than forty years by journalist and bibliophile John Seigenthaler before his death in 2014. The show features authors who discuss their books, the publishing business, and their personal lives. The rebooted show is filmed on location in Nashville, and appears on-air in two- to three-minute segments. In 2017, the first season of "A Word on Words" won a regional EMMY for Best Interstitial. In 2018, NPT was awarded the NETA Award from the National Educational Telecommunications Association for the show.

Ellison is also the founder of Two Tales Press, an independent publishing house featuring Ellison's short stories and novellas.

Under the fantasy pen name of Joss Walker, Ellison is working on an urban fantasy series called Jayne Thorne, CIA Librarian.

An amateur oenophile, Ellison occasionally posts to The Wine Vixen, a blog dedicated to all things vino. The blog resurrects Ellison's Wine Recommendation of the Week, a staple of her blog posts on Murderati, and features wines for any budget, travelogues, wine zeitgeist, and more.

== Personal life ==
Ellison lives with her husband and twin cats in Nashville.

== Reception ==
- The Sixth Day debuted at #3 on the New York Times Best Sellers List and #2 on the list of USA TODAY Best-Selling Books
- The Devil's Triangle debuted at #1 on the Wall Street Journal Best-Selling Books list, #2 on the New York Times Best Sellers List and #2 on the list of USA TODAY Best-Selling Books
- The End Game reached #5 on the New York Times Best Sellers List
- The Lost Key climbed to #3 on the New York Times Best Sellers List and was named one of the Best Thrillers of 2014 by Library Journal
- The Final Cut reached #3 on the New York Times Best Sellers List and #3 on the list of USA TODAY Best-selling Books
- No One Knows reached #122 on the list of USA TODAY Best-Selling Books
- All the Pretty Girls reached #87 on the list of USA TODAY Best-Selling Books
- Lie to Me reached #9 on the Toronto Star Original Fiction bestseller list, #10 on The Globe and Mail Hardcover Fiction bestseller list, and #55 on the list of USA TODAY Best-selling Books

=== Awards ===
- SIBA 2017 Southern Book Prize Long List, Thriller nominee (Field of Graves and No One Knows)
- 2016 Spring Okra Pick (Field of Graves, 2016)
- 2016 Winter Okra Pick (No One Knows, 2016)
- ITW Thriller Award for Best Paperback Original (The Cold Room, 2010)
- Best Mystery/Thriller Writer by Nashville Scene's "Best of Nashville 2008"
- Romantic Times Reviewer's Choice nominee for Best Suspense/Thriller
  - A Deeper Darkness (2012)
  - The Final Cut (2013)
  - When Shadows Fall (2014)
  - What Lies Behind (2015)
  - The End Game (2015)
  - The Devil's Triangle (2017)
- RITA® Nominee for Best Romantic Suspense (Where All the Dead Lie, 2012)
- RITA® Nominee for Best Romantic Suspense (Field of Graves, 2017)

=== Trade Picks ===
==== Book of the Month Club ====
- No One Knows

==== Indie Next Pick ====
- A Deeper Darkness

==== Publishers Weekly Pick of the Week ====
- A Deeper Darkness
- When Shadows Fall

==== She Reads Book Club Selection ====
- No One Knows

==== SIBA Okra Pick ====
- Field of Graves
- No One Knows

== Selected bibliography ==
=== Standalone Novels ===
- No One Knows (2016)
- Lie to Me (2017)
- Tear Me Apart (2018)
- Good Girls Lie (2019)
- Her Dark Lies (2021)
- It's One of Us (2023)

=== A Brit in the FBI series (with Catherine Coulter) ===
- The Final Cut (2013) introduces Scotland Yard Detective Chief Inspector Nicholas Drummond. Features Special Agents Lacey Sherlock and Dillon Savich from Coulter's bestselling FBI series
- The Lost Key (2014)
- The End Game (2015)
- The Devil's Triangle (2017)
- The Sixth Day (2018)
- The Last Second (2019)

=== Dr. Samantha Owens series ===
- A Deeper Darkness (2012) medical examiner Dr. Samantha Owens was a secondary character in Ellison's Lieutenant Taylor Jackson series
- Edge of Black (2012)
- When Shadows Fall (2014)
- What Lies Behind (2015)

=== Lieutenant Taylor Jackson series ===
- Field of Graves (2016), a prequel, introduces Nashville homicide detective Taylor Jackson
- All The Pretty Girls (2007)
- 14 (2008)
- Judas Kiss (2009)
- The Cold Room (2010)
- The Immortals (2010)
- So Close the Hand of Death (2011)
- Where All the Dead Lie (2011)

=== Short stories ===
==== Featuring Lieutenant Taylor Jackson ====
- "Blood Sugar Baby" in Slices of Night-a 3 part novella (2011) (with Erica Spindler and Alex Kava)
- "Whiteout" in Storm Season-One Sensational Storm, 3 Terrifying Killers (2012) (with Erica Spindler and Alex Kava)

==== Other ====
- A Thousand Doors: An Anthology of Many Lives (2018, Two Tales Press)
- Dead Ends: Stories from the Gothic South (2017, Two Tales Press)
- The First Decade: A Short Story Collection (2016, Two Tales Press)
- "Prodigal Me" in Killer Year: Stories to Die For (January 2008), Lee Child, ed. (Minotaur Press)
- "X" in Demolition Magazine (2007) and Nashville Lifestyles (February 2009)
- "Chimera" in Surreal South '09 (2009), Laura Benedict and Pinckney Benedict, ed. (Press 53)
- "Killing Carol Ann" in First Thrills (2010), Lee Child, ed. (Tor)
- Sweet Little Lies (2010), an anthology of short stories by J.T. Ellison
- "Gray Lady, Lady Gray" in Surreal South '11 (October 2011), Laura Benedict and Pinckney Benedict, ed. (Press 53)
- "Where’d You Get That Red Dress?" in Flashing in the Gutters (2007), (inspired by James McMurtry)
- "The Number of Man" in Thriller 3: Love is Murder (2012), Sandra Brown, ed. (Mira Books)
- "The Omen Days" (2015, Two Tales Press)

=== Non-fiction ===
- "The Charm School: An Appreciation of Nelson DeMille's Groundbreaking Novel" in THRILLERS: 100 Must Reads (July 2010), David Morrell and Hank Wagner, ed.
- "What is Evil?" in WANTED UNDEAD OR ALIVE: Vampire Hunters and Other Kick-Ass Enemies of Evil (August 2010), Jonathan Maberry and Janice Gable Bashman, ed.
