= College of Saint Mary =

Catholic women's college in Omaha, Nebraska, US

Coordinates: 41°14′26″N 96°01′17″W

- Type: Private women's university
- Established: 1923
- Religious affiliation: Catholic (Sisters of Mercy)
- Academic affiliations: Space-grant
- President: Heather A. Smith
- Students: 759 (fall 2025)
- Location: Omaha, Nebraska, United States
- Campus: Urban
- Colors: Navy Blue, Sky Blue & Gold
- Nickname: Flames
- Sporting affiliations: NAIA – GPAC
- Website: www.csm.edu
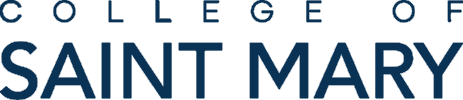

The College of Saint Mary is a private Catholic women's college in Omaha, Nebraska, United States. Enrollment is approximately 850 students. It offers more than 30 undergraduate and seven graduate degree programs. The campus is located in the Aksarben Village community of Omaha. While its undergraduate students are exclusively female, its graduate programs are co-ed.

== History ==
The College of Saint Mary was formed in 1923 by the Sisters of Mercy in Omaha, Nebraska as a seminary and junior college. The Sisters of Mercy officially received approval from the Nebraska Department of Education on August 14, and the Mt. Saint Mary Junior College opened soon after. In June 1955, Saint Mary Junior College received accreditation from the Higher Learning Commission and became a four-year college. Additionally, the college rebranded to the College of Saint Mary. That same year, the college completed and moved into its current campus in South-Central Omaha.

In 1988, the College of Saint Mary opened a campus in Lincoln, Nebraska. In 1994, the college began accepting male students onto its Lincoln campus due to a federal grant requiring a non-discrimination clause. However, by 2002, there were no male students on either the Omaha or Lincoln campuses. In 2005 and 2007, the college began offering master's and doctoral degrees. Due to low enrollment and financial difficulties, College of Saint Mary closed its Lincoln campus in 2011.

== Campus ==
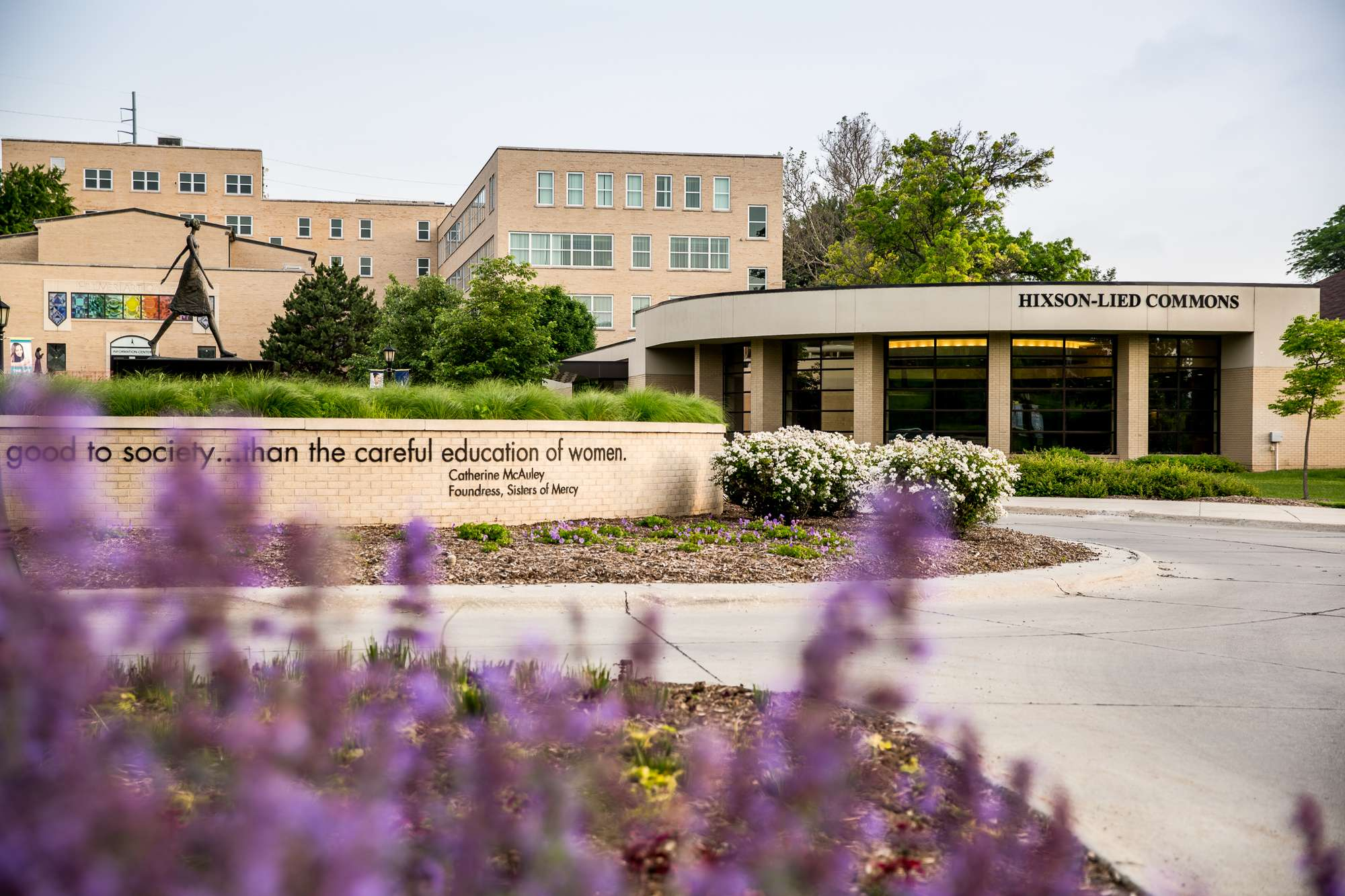
The main campus of the College of Saint Mary in 2019

The College of Saint Mary's main campus is located in Central Omaha, Nebraska. The main campus includes three residential halls, the Flames Sport Complex, Lied Fitness Center Fieldhouse, Prayer Garden, CSM Plaza, and Mercy Hall.

== Academics ==
Undergraduate demographics as of 2025
Race and ethnicity	Total
White	57%
Hispanic	23%
International student	2%
Two or more races	3%
Black	9%
Asian	1%
Unknown	3%
Economic diversity
Low-income (Note: The percentage of students who received an income-based federal Pell grant intended for low-income students.)	41%
Affluent (Note: The percentage of students who are a part of the American middle class at the bare minimum.)	59%

College of Saint Mary is a private not-for-profit Catholic women's college. As of 2023, the college has enrolled 857 students. The college offers bachelor's, master's and doctoral degrees. The college has 31 undergraduate fields of study. Major fields of study include Registered Nursing, Rehabilitation and Therapeutic Professions, Practical Nursing, Liberal Arts and Sciences, and Teacher Education and Professional Development.

== Athletics ==
The College of Saint Mary (CSM) athletic teams are called the Flames. The college is a member of the National Association of Intercollegiate Athletics (NAIA), primarily competing in the Great Plains Athletic Conference (GPAC) for 9 of its 11 sports since the 2015–16 academic year; its swimming & diving team competes in the Kansas Collegiate Athletic Conference (KCAC). The Flames previously competed in the defunct Midlands Collegiate Athletic Conference (MCAC) from 1994–95 to 2014–15. CSM competes in 11 intercollegiate varsity sports: basketball, bowling, competitive dance, cross country, golf, soccer, softball, swimming, tennis, track & field and volleyball. In 2021, CSM completed construction on the Lied Fitness Center Fieldhouse.

== Notable people ==
=== Alumni ===
- Sharon "Alex" Kava 1982, novelist

=== Presidents ===
- Maryanne Stevens, until 2023
- Heather A. Smith, 2023–present
