= Catherine Coulter =

American romance novelist

- Born: Jean Catherine Coulter; December 26, 1942 (age 83); Cameron County, Texas, U.S.
- Occupation: Romance novelist
- Writing career
- Pen name: Catherine Coulter
- Period: 1978–present
- Genres: Romantic novel, historical romance, contemporary suspense thrillers
- Website: www.catherinecoulter.com

Jean Catherine Coulter (born December 26, 1942) is an American author of romantic suspense thrillers and historical romances who lives in northern California.

== Early life and education ==
Coulter grew up on a horse ranch in Cameron County, Texas.

While a freshman at the University of Texas, Coulter wrote poetry. After earning her undergraduate degree from the University of Texas, Coulter attended Boston College and earned a master's degree in early 19th-century European history.

== Writing career ==
When Coulter finished writing her novel she sent it to an editor at Signet. Three days later Signet offered her a three-book contract. That first novel, The Autumn Countess, was published by Penguin Books in 1978. By 1982, she was earning enough to quit her job and become a full-time writer. Since then she has written over fifty books and has had forty-two consecutive New York Times Bestsellers since 1988. Her thriller The Maze was her first book to place on the New York Times Hardcover Bestseller list, while The Cove spent nine weeks on the New York Times Paperback Bestseller list and sold over one million copies. Coulter generally publishes one historical romance and one suspense novel each year, and has been rewriting many of her earlier Regency romances to turn them into longer historical romances.

== Personal life ==
Coulter lives in Sausalito, California with her husband.

== Published works ==
=== Regency ===
==== Baron series ====
1. The Wild Baron (1981/1997)
2. The Offer (1981/1997)
3. The Deception (1983/1999)

==== The Sherbrooke series ====
1. The Sherbrooke Bride (1992)
2. The Hellion Bride (1992)
3. The Heiress Bride (1993)
4. Mad Jack (1999)
5. The Courtship (2000)
6. The Scottish Bride (2001)
7. Pendragon (2002)
8. The Sherbrooke Twins (2004)
9. Lyon's Gate (2005)
10. Wizards Daughter (2007)
11. The Prince of Ravenscar (2011)

===== Grayson Sherbrooke's Otherworldly Adventures [e-novellas] =====
1. The Strange Visitation at Wolffe Hall (2015)
2. The Resident Evil at Blackthorn Manor (2016)
3. The Ancient Spirits of Sedgwick House (October 30, 2018)

==== Night Trilogy ====
1. Night Fire (1989)
2. Night Shadow (1989)
3. Night Storm (1990)

==== Legacy series ====
1. The Wyndham Legacy (1994)
2. The Nightingale Legacy (1995)
3. The Valentine Legacy (1995)

==== The Magic Trilogy ====
1. Midsummer Magic (1987)
2. Calypso Magic (1988)
3. Moonspun Magic (1988)

==== Single novels ====
1. The Countess (1978/1999)
2. The Rebel Bride (1997)
3. The Heir (1980)
4. The Duke (1997)
5. Lord Harry (1993/1997)

=== Georgian ===
1. Devil's Embrace Penguin/Signet (re-issued, re-written version 5/2000)
2. Devil's Daughter Penguin/Signet (re-release 9/12/2000)

=== Victorian/Early San Francisco ===
1. Evening Star Penguin/Topaz (original title Sweet Surrender)
2. Midnight Star Penguin/Topaz, (reissued 10/96)
3. Wild Star Penguin/Topaz
4. Jade Star Penguin/Topaz

=== Medieval ===
1. Warrior's Song (rewritten version of Chandra) Penguin/Signet
2. Fire Song Penguin/Signet
3. Earth Song Penguin/Signet
4. Secret Song Penguin/Signet
5. Rosehaven Berkley/Jove
6. The Penwyth Curse (new release Jan. 2003) Berkley/Jove
7. The Valcourt Heiress Putnam Adult (October 2010)

=== Viking Era ===
1. Season of the Sun Penguin/NAL/Onyx
2. Lord of Hawkfell Island Berkley/Jove
3. Lord of Raven's Peak Berkley/Jove
4. Lord of Falcon Ridge Berkley/Jove

=== Contemporary romance ===
- Aftershocks Silhouette/Harlequin
- Afterglow Silhouette/Harlequin
- The Aristocrat Silhouette/Harlequin

=== Contemporary romantic thrillers ===
1. False Pretenses (1988)
2. Impulse (1990)
3. Beyond Eden (1992)
4. Born to Be Wild (2006)

=== FBI Thrillers ===
1. The Cove. 1996.
2. The Maze. 1997.
3. The Target. 1998.
4. The Edge. 1999.
5. Riptide. 2000.
6. Hemlock Bay. 2001.
7. Eleventh Hour. 2002.
8. Blindside. 2003.
9. Blowout. 2004.
10. Point Blank. 2005.
11. Double Take. 2007.
12. TailSpin. 2008.
13. Knock Out. 2009.
14. Whiplash. 2010.
15. Split Second. 2011.
16. Backfire. 2012.
17. Bombshell. 2013.
18. Power Play. 2014.
19. Nemesis. 2015.
20. Insidious. 2016.
21. Enigma. 2017.
22. Paradox. 2018.
23. Labyrinth. 2019.
24. Deadlock. 2020.
25. Vortex. 2021.
26. Reckoning. 2022.
27. Flashpoint. 2024.

Omnibus editions

1. The Beginning. 2005. (containing The Cove & The Maze)
2. Double Jeopardy. 2008. (containing The Target & The Edge)
3. Twice Dead. 2011. (containing Riptide & Hemlock Bay)
4. Second Shot. 2014. (containing Eleventh Hour & Blindside)

=== A Brit in the FBI ===
1. The Final Cut. 2013. written with J.T. Ellison
2. The Lost Key. 2014. written with J.T. Ellison
3. The End Game. 2015. written with J.T. Ellison
4. The Devil's Triangle. 2017. written with J.T. Ellison
5. The Sixth Day. 2018. written with J.T. Ellison
6. The Last Second. 2019. written with J.T. Ellison [Release Date: March 26, 2019]
