= Heather A. Smith =

American nurse and academic administrator

8th President of College of Saint Mary
- Incumbent
- Assumed office July 1, 2023
- Preceded by: Maryanne Stevens

Personal details
- Education: Vanderbilt University; Creighton University; University of Nebraska Omaha

Heather A. Smith is an American nurse and academic administrator serving as the eight president of the College of Saint Mary since 2023.

== Life ==
Smith is from Omaha, Nebraska. She graduated from the Duchesne Academy of the Sacred Heart. She earned a bachelor's degree in biology at Vanderbilt University. She completed a Bachelor of Science in nursing from Creighton University. Smith earned a M.B.A. at the University of Nebraska Omaha.

Smith was a registered nurse and healthcare administrator. She was the chief administrative officer for Children's Specialty Physicians and vice president of operations for specialty physicians Children's Specialty Physicians. She was later vice president of pediatrics and vice president of ambulatory services at the Children's Hospital & Medical Center. On July 1, 2023, Smith became the eight president of the College of Saint Mary, succeeding Maryanne Stevens.
