= Devin Kelley =

American actress

- Born: Saint Paul, Minnesota, U.S.
- Occupation: Actress
- Years active: 2005–present

Devin Kelley is an American actress. She starred in the ABC drama series Resurrection playing Dr. Maggie Langston and also co-starred on the Fox crime drama The Chicago Code. She also starred in eight films, four of which are short movies.

== Early life ==
Kelley was born and raised in St. Paul, Minnesota, not including the four years she spent with her family in Brussels, Belgium. She has a brother Ryan and a sister Lauren. Starting in the eighth grade, she took voice and acting lessons from her instructor, John Lynn. After graduating from Eastview High School in Apple Valley during 2004, Kelley moved to Los Angeles to attend the USC School of Theatre's BFA acting program. Kelley also spent a semester at the British American Drama Academy in London.

== Career ==
Upon graduation, Kelley was accepted into the Williamstown Theatre Festival. Her breakout role was in The Chicago Code, which she prepared for by talking to female police officers, going on a ride-along with Chicago police officers, and visiting a shooting range and the Cook County Morgue. She later starred as a lead character in the 2012 horror film Chernobyl Diaries, and had a recurring role on Covert Affairs.

In 2013, Kelley was cast as Dr. Maggie Langston in the ABC drama series Resurrection.

Kelley has a recurring role as Shannon Diaz and Kim on 9-1-1.

== Filmography ==
=== Film ===
Year	Title	Role	Notes
2005	Les Ours	Chrysanthemum	Short film
2008	The Roommate	Susan	Short film
2009	Refrigerator	Marion	Short film
2012	Chernobyl Diaries	Amanda	
2014	Turtle Island	Daisy	
2014	Anchors	Julia	
2015	Swept Under	Morgan Sher	
2017	Reception	Jessie/Jess	Short film (21:34 minutes)

=== Television ===
Year	Title	Role	Notes
2009	Tease	Kat	Recurring role; 3 episodes
2011	The Chicago Code	Vonda Wysocki	Main role; 13 episodes
2011–2012	Covert Affairs	Parker Rowland	Recurring role; 6 episodes
2014–2015	Resurrection	Dr. Maggie Langston	Main role; 21 episodes
2015	Swept Under	Morgan Sher	LMN Movie
2016–2017	Frequency	Julie Sullivan	Main role
2018–present	9-1-1	Shannon Diaz	Recurring role; 7 episodes
2024	9-1-1	Kim	Guest role; 2 episodes
