= Aleksander Kaczorowski =

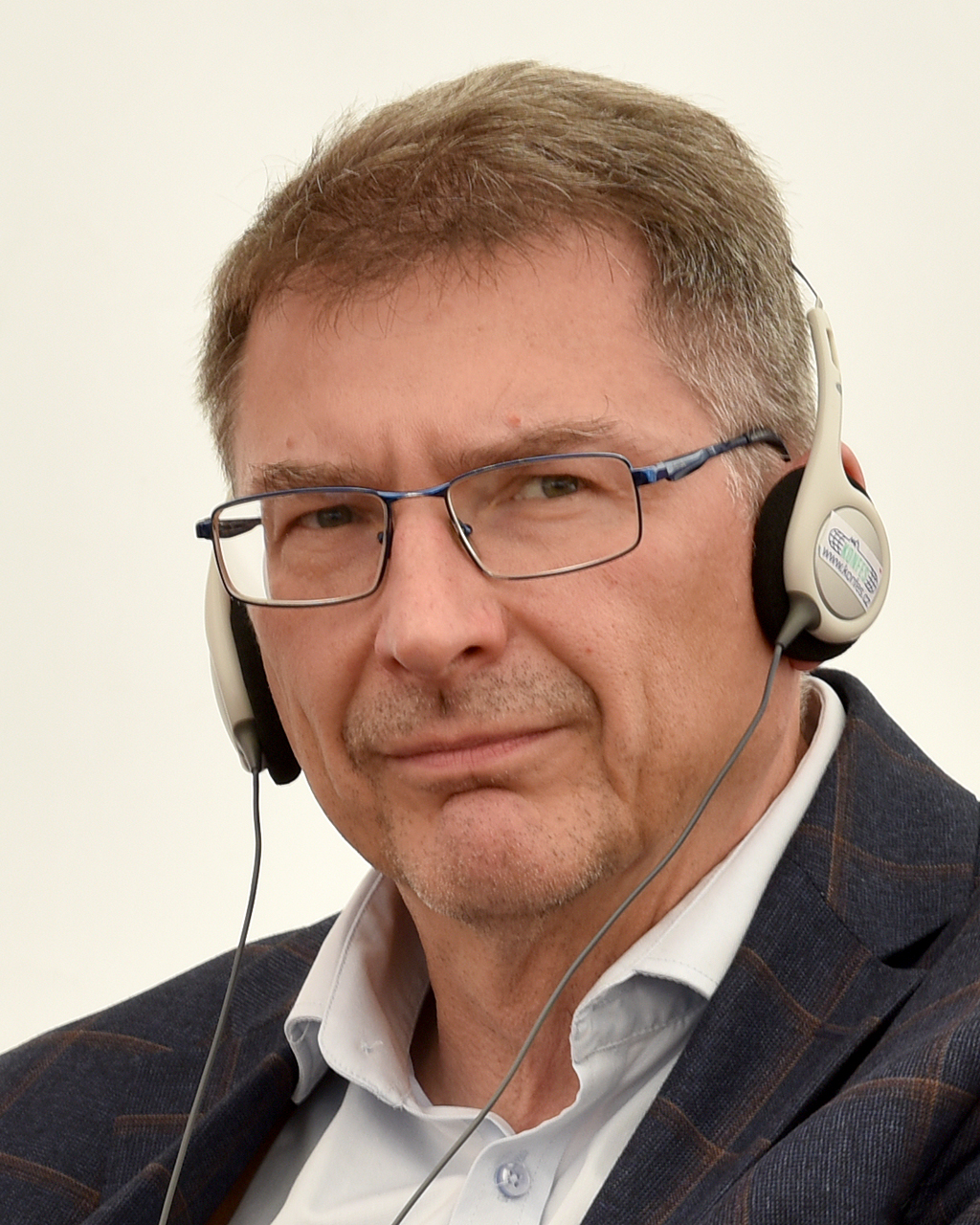
- Kaczorowski in 2024
- Born: May 29, 1969 (age 57); Żyrardów
- Education: University of Warsaw
- Employer(s): Gazeta Wyborcza, Newsweek Polska, Forum, University of Warsaw, Aspen Review Central Europe

Aleksander Kaczorowski (born 29 May 1969 in Żyrardów) is a Polish bohemist, journalist, editor, writer and translator.

== Life ==
Kaczorowski has been studying at the Institute of Sociology of the University of Warsaw. In 1998, he graduated from Czech studies at the University of Warsaw.

Until 2002, he worked as a head of section for Gazeta Wyborcza, the biggest Polish newspaper. Later, he was deputy editor-in-chief of Newsweek Polska and Forum biweekly. Since 2012, he is editor-in-chief of Aspen Review Central Europe quarterly. He lectures at the University of Warsaw Institute of Western and Southern Slavic Studies.

He authored novels: Praskie łowy (Hunting in Prague) and collections of essays Praski elementarz (The Prague Reader), Ballada o kapciach (The Ballad of Slippers), as well as interviews Europa z płaskostopiem (Europe's Flat Feet). He wrote also biographies of Václav Havel Havel. Zemsta bezsilnych (Havel. The Revenge of the Powerless), Bohumil Hrabal Gra w życie (Playing at Life), and Ota Pavel Ota Pavel: pod powierzchnią (Ota Pavel: Beneath the Surface). Kaczorowski has translated books of such Czech authors as Bohumil Hrabal, Egon Bondy, and Josef Škvorecký, among others. He is member of Polish Writers' Association.

In 2015, Kaczorowski was nominated for Teresa Torańska Prize of Newsweek for his book on Havel. That year he was named by European Solidarity Centre and College of Eastern Europe the Ambassador of New Europe. He won Václav Burian Prize for cultural contribution to the Central European dialogue (2016). In 2019, he was awarded Upper Silesian Literary Award "Juliusz" and nominated for Nike Literary Award for the book about Ota Pavel.

== Works ==
Books

- Praski elementarz, Wołowiec: Czarne, 2001, 2012, ISBN 978-83-7536-277-0.
- Gra w życie. Opowieść o Bohumilu Hrabalu, Wołowiec: Czarne, 2004, ISBN 838739198-0.
  - Életjáték – Történet Bohumil Hrabalról, Budapest: Európa Könyvkiadó, 2006, ISBN 978-963-07-8131-2.
  - Il gioco della vita. La storia di Bohumil Hrabal, Rome: Edizioni E/O, 2007, ISBN 978-8876417559.
- Europa z płaskostopiem, Wołowiec: Czarne, 2006, ISBN 83-89755-64-5.
- Praskie łowy, Warszawa: Świat Książki, 2007, ISBN 978-83-247-0835-2.
- Ballada o kapciach, Wołowiec: Czarne, 2012, ISBN 978-83-7536-350-0.
- Havel. Zemsta bezsilnych, Wołowiec: Czarne, 2014, ISBN 978-83-7536-557-3.
- Hrabal. Słodka apokalipsa, Wołowiec: Czarne, 2016, ISBN 978-83-8049-221-9.
- Ota Pavel: pod powierzchnią, Wołowiec: Czarne. 2018, ISBN 978-83-8049-677-4.
- Czechy. To nevymyslíš, Warszawa: Muza, 2022, ISBN 978-83-287-2086-2.
- Prezydent. Aleksander Kwaśniewski w rozmowie z Aleksandrem Kaczorowskim, Kraków: Znak Literanova, 2023, ISBN 9788324073979.
- Babel. Człowiek bez losu, Wołowiec: Czarne 2023, ISBN 978-83-8191-777-3.

Translations

- Egon Bondy, Noga świętego Patryka, Izabelin: Świat Literacki 1995, ISBN 978-83-86646-11-1.
- Bohumil Hrabal, Czuły barbarzyńca, Izabelin: Świat Literacki 1997, ISBN 978-83-626-7607-1.
- Josef Škvorecký, Przypadki niefortunnego saksofonisty tenorowego, Izabelin: Świat Literacki, 1999, ISBN 83-86646-87-X.
- László Szigeti, Drybling Hidegkutiego, czyli rozmowy z Hrabalem, Izabelin: Świat Literacki, 2002, ISBN 83-88612-23-9.
- Bohumil Hrabal, Piękna rupieciarnia, Wołowiec: Czarne, 2006, ISBN 978-83-8049-787-0 (with Jan Stachowski).
- Helga Weissová, Dziennik Helgi: świadectwo dziewczynki o życiu w obozach koncentracyjnych, Kraków: Insignis Media, 2013, ISBN 978-83-63944-04-9.
- Josef Pazderka (ed.), Inwazja na Czechosłowację 1968. Perspektywa rosyjska, Instytut Pamięci Narodowej 2015, ISBN 978-83-7629-818-4.
- Jiří Pelán, Hrabal w lustrze krytyki, [in:] W poszukiwaniu przerw w zabudowie. W stulecie urodzin Bohumila Hrabala, (ed. J. Goszczyńska), Warszawa 2015.
- Jakub Češka, Nic, tylko strach, czyli ironiczna spowiedź, [in:] W poszukiwaniu przerw w zabudowie. W stulecie urodzin Bohumila Hrabala, (ed. J. Goszczyńska), Warszawa 2015.
