= Bharti Kirchner =

American author

Bharti Kirchner is an American author. She is the author of thirteen books—nine novels and four cookbooks—and has been publishing since 1992. She has written numerous articles and essays on food, travel, fitness, and lifestyle. She has won two Seattle Arts Commission literature grants, and an Artist Trust GAP grant. Her work has been translated into German, Dutch, Spanish, Marathi, Thai and other languages.

Prior to becoming a writer, Kirchner worked as a systems engineer for IBM and as a systems manager for Bank of America, San Francisco. She has also worked in Europe and other continents as a computer systems consultant.

== Books ==
=== Novels ===
- Die Sonnen Tänzerin
- Shiva Dancing (1998)
- Sharmila's Book (1999)
- Darjeeling (2002)
- Pastries: A Novel of Desserts and Discoveries (2003)
- Tulip Season (2012)
- Goddess of Fire
- Season of Sacrifice (2017)

=== Cookbooks ===
- The Healthy Cuisine of India (1992)
- Indian Inspired (1993)
- The Bold Vegetarian (1995)
- Vegetarian Burgers (1996)
