= Ivaylo Ditchev =

Bulgarian anthropologist (1955–2023)

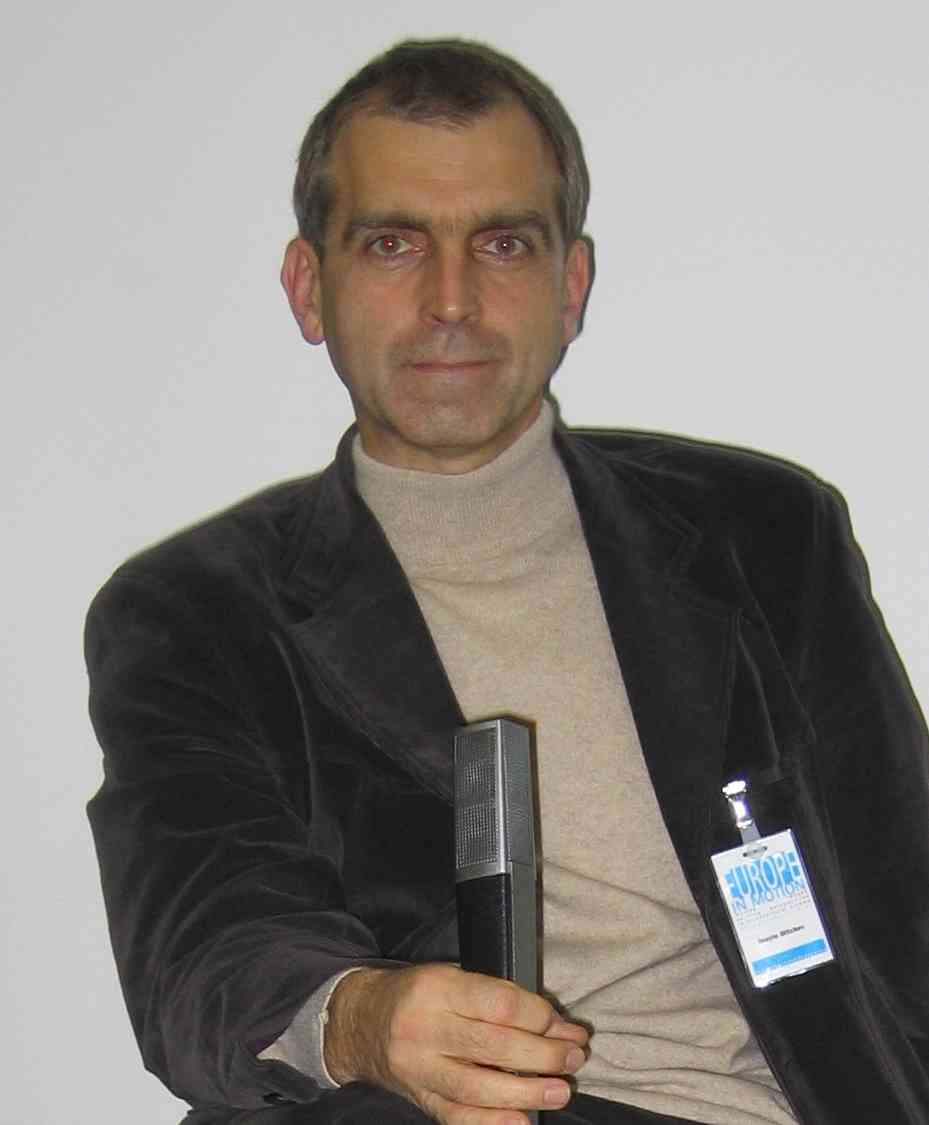

Ivaylo Stefanov Ditchev (Bulgarian: Ивайло Стефанов Дичев; 28 March 1955 – 6 November 2023) was a Bulgarian anthropologist. He was a professor of cultural anthropology at Sofia University. He also taught abroad, mainly in France and the United States.

== Biography ==
Ivaylo Ditchev was born on 28 March 1955.

He held a doctorate from Sofia and Paris-7 universities. He focused on political culture and urban anthropology of Southeast Europe and the Balkans.

Ditchev died on 6 November 2023, at the age of 68.

== Works ==
- Cultural scenes of the political Sofia, Prosveta, 2019
- Culture as distance. 11 essays in cultural anthropology. Sofia University, 2016
- Citizens beyond places? New mobilities, new borders, new forms of belonging, Prosveta, 2009 (Bulgarian)
- Spaces of Desire, Desire of Spaces. Studies in Urban Anthropology, Sofia, 2005
- Form belonging to identity. Politics of the image, Sofia, 2002
- Gift in the Age of its Technical Reproductibility, Sofia, 1999
- To Give Without Losing. Exchange in the imaginary of Modernity, Paris, 1997

(French)

- Albania-Utopia. Behind Closed Doors in the Balkans, (author, editor) Paris, 1996 (French)
- Eroticism of authorship, Sofia, 1991
- Literalisms, miniatures, Sofia 1991
- Borders between me and me, essays, Sofia 1990
- A second after the end of the world, short stories, Sofia, 1988
- Identification, novel, Sofia, 1987
- Astral Calendar, short stories, Sofia 1982
- I learn to cry, short stories, Sofia 1979
