= Alex Kava =

American novelist

- Born: Sharon M. Kava; June 7, 1960 (age 66); Silver Creek, Nebraska, U.S.
- Education: College of Saint Mary (BA)
- Writing career
- Genre: psychological suspense

Alex Kava (born Sharon M. Kava; June 7, 1960, in Silver Creek, Nebraska) is an American author of psychological suspense novels.

== Biography ==
Growing up in the country outside of Silver Creek, Nebraska, Sharon Kava fantasized about becoming a writer. Her parents, although they understood the value of education, had a tremendous work ethic. Reading was seen as frivolous unless required as schoolwork. As a teenager, Kava wrote short stories on the backs of calendars, sharing them only with her younger brother and hiding them in a shoe box under her bed.

Kava earned an art scholarship to attend college. To pay living expenses, she worked in a nearby hospital's central supply department collecting and sterilizing all of the basins, instruments, and equipment from surgery, pathology, and the morgue. In 1982 she graduated magna cum laude from College of Saint Mary in Omaha, Nebraska, with a B.A. in art and English.

After graduating, Kava held a variety of jobs, mostly in advertising and marketing. Starting her own graphic design firm, Square One, she designed food packages and logos for national corporations, wrote brochures and newsletters, created a line of greeting cards, and directed TV and radio commercials. In 1992 she returned to her alma mater as its director of public relations.

Kava quit her public relations position in the summer of 1996, wanting to dedicate more time to writing fiction and getting published. To pay the bills, she resurrected Square One, refinanced her home, maxed out her credit cards, and even took on a newspaper delivery route. Her first novel was published in 2000. At that time, she chose to use the first name "Alex" professionally to disguise her gender, though she now includes photos and other identifying information on book jackets and in publicity materials.

Alex Kava is a member of International Thriller Writers and the Nebraska Writers Guild. Her books have sold over 6 million copies worldwide. She is published in 34 countries and has made the bestsellers lists in the United States, Poland, Australia, Germany, the United Kingdom, and Italy.

== Awards ==
- Mari Sandoz Award
- 2016 Florida Book Award
- 2016 Nebraska Book Award

== Books ==
Alex Kava's novels include her series with FBI Profiler Maggie O'Dell, a second series with dog handler Ryder Creed (with O'Dell as an additional character), and other stand-alone novels, collaborations, and short stories. Kava is fascinated with true life crimes and includes details from various crime expert sources in her work. She was the Guest of Honor at the Mayhem in the Midlands 2008 Mystery Conference, held in Omaha, NE. Her book ONE FALSE MOVE was selected as the 2006 One Nebraska One Read feature.

Maggie O'Dell

1. A Perfect Evil (2000)
2. Split Second (2001)
3. The Soul Catcher (2002)
4. At the Stroke of Madness (2003)
5. A Necessary Evil (2006)
6. Exposed (October 2008)
7. Black Friday (September 2009)
8. Damaged (July 2010)
9. Hot wire (July 2011)
10. Fireproof (July 2012)
11. Stranded (July 2013)
12. Before Evil (September 2017)

Ryder Creed

1. Breaking Creed (January 2015)
2. Silent Creed (July 2015)
3. Reckless Creed (2016)
4. Lost Creed (March 2018)
5. Desperate Creed (2019)
6. Hidden Creed (2020)
7. Fallen Creed (2021)
8. Chasing Creed (2025)

Standalone novels

- One False Move (2004) (One Book One Nebraska Reads Project for 2006)
- Whitewash (May 2007)

Short stories

- A Breath of Hot Air (2011)
- Slices of Night: A Three-Part Novella (December 2011 with authors Erica Spindler & J.T. Ellison)

Short story collections

- Storm Season: One Sensational Storm, Three Terrifying Killers (December 2012 with authors Erica Spindler & J.T. Ellison)

Other Stories

- Goodnight, Sweet Mother in Thriller (2006) (anthology with a short story by Alex Kava)
