= Betsy Lerner =

American literary agent and author (born 1961)

Betsy Lerner (born 1961) is an American literary agent and author.

== Books ==
- Shred Sisters: A Novel (2024)
- The Bridge Ladies: A Memoir (2016)
- Food and Loathing (2003)
- The Forest for the Trees: An Editor's Advice to Writers (2000)
