= James E. Post =

American author and professor

James E. Post is an American author and professor who holds the John F. Smith Jr. Professorship in Management at Boston University.

In 2010, James E. Post was awarded the Aspen Institute Faculty Pioneers and Dissertation Proposal Award.
