= Erica Spindler =

American novelist

- Born: 1957 (age 68–69)
- Education: Delta State University (BFA); University of New Orleans (MFA)
- Occupation: Author

Erica Spindler (born 1957) is a New York Times Best-Selling author, who specializes in romantic thrillers.

== Personal life ==
Spindler was raised in Rockford, Illinois. She lives with her husband, an advertisement executive, and their two sons in New Orleans, Louisiana.

Spindler had planned on becoming an artist, earning a Bachelor of Fine Arts from Delta State University and a Master of Fine Arts from the University of New Orleans in the visual arts.

In June 1982, while she was in bed with a cold, she picked up a romance novel for relief from daytime television. She was immediately hooked and soon decided to try to write one herself. She leaped from romance to suspense in 1996 with her novel Forbidden Fruit.

== Bibliography ==
=== Novels ===
- Heaven Sent (1987)
- Longer Than (1991)
- Baby Mine (1992)
- Tempting Chance (1993)
- Baby, Come Back (1994)
- Slow Heat (1995)
- Red (1995)
- Forbidden Fruit (1996)
- Fortune (1997)
- Shocking Pink (1998)
- Cause for Alarm (1999)
- All Fall Down (2000)
- Bone Cold (2001)
- Dead Run (2002)
- In Silence (2003)
- Blood Vines (2010)
- Justice for Sara (2013)
- The First Wife (2015)
- The Other Girl (2017)
- The Look-Alike (2020)

=== Series ===
- Opposites Attract
  - Chances Are (1989)
  - Read Between the Lines (1989)
  - Rhyme Or Reason (1990)
  - Wishing Moon (1991)
- Blossoms of the South
  - A Winter's Rose (1992)
  - Magnolia Dawn (1993)
  - Night Jasmine (1993)
- Stacy Killian
  - See Jane Die (2004)
  - Killer Takes All (2005)
  - Last Known Victim (2007)
  - Watch Me Die (2012)
- Kitt Lundgren
  - Copycat (2006)
  - Breakneck (2008)
- The Lightkeepers
  - "Random Acts" (2015) in Sweet Dreams Boxed Set
  - The Final Seven (2016)
  - Triple Six (2017) (aka If You Dare)
  - Fallen Five (2018)
