= Edward T. Cone =

American composer and pianist (1917–2004)

Edward Toner Cone (May 4, 1917 – October 23, 2004) was an American composer, music theorist, pianist, and philanthropist.

== Life and career ==
Cone was born in Greensboro, North Carolina. He studied composition under Roger Sessions at Princeton University, receiving his bachelor's in 1939 (Latin salutatorian and the first Princeton student to submit a musical composition as his senior thesis). Cone and Milton Babbitt were the first to earn graduate degrees in musical composition from Princeton (MFA, 1942). He studied piano with Karl Ulrich Schnabel and Edward Steuermann. During the Second World War, Cone served first in the army (as a pianist) and later in the Office of Strategic Services. Beginning in 1946, he taught at Princeton. He was the co-editor of the journal Perspectives of New Music between 1965 and 1969.

Cone, known for his contributions to music criticism and analysis, also composed a significant body of music. His scholarly work addressed musical form and aesthetics, particularly questions of rhythm and musical phrasing. He died in Princeton, New Jersey, aged 87. Cone was the companion of Princeton philosophy professor George Pitcher for nearly 48 years.

Cone's students include Michael Dellaira, Hobart Earle, Alan Fletcher, Robert Greenberg, John Heiss, David Lewin, Gilbert Levine, Mathilde McKinney, Robert P. Morgan, Mario Pelusi, Malcolm Peyton, Harold Powers, Victor Rosenbaum, John Solum, Richard Aaker Trythall, Beth Wiemann, and Edgar Warren Williams. See: List of music students by teacher: C to F#Edward T. Cone.

Cone was a member of both the American Philosophical Society and the American Academy of Arts and Sciences.

== Composition ==
=== Instrumental works ===
==== Orchestra ====
- Elegy (1953)
- Music for Strings (1964)
- An Overture for the War (Prelude to Victory) (1942)
- Symphony (1953)
- Variations for Orchestra (1968)

==== Solo instrument and orchestra ====
- Cadenzas (1979) for violin, oboe, and string orchestra
- Concerto for Violin and Small Orchestra (1959) for violin and orchestra
- Nocturne and Rondo for Orchestra and Piano (1957) for piano and orchestra

==== Small ensemble (3–14 players) ====
- Capriccio for String Quartet (1981) for 2 violins, viola, and cello
- Clarinet Quintet (1941) for clarinet, 2 violins, viola, and cello
- Divertimento for Woodwinds (1940–46) for flute, oboe, English horn, 2 clarinets, and bassoon
- Fanfare (1948) for 6 trumpets, 3 horns, 3 trombones, and 2 tubas
- Funeral Stanzas (1965) for flute, oboe, clarinet, horn, and bassoon
- Music for a Film (1951) for clarinet, 2 violins, viola, and cello
- Ostinato, Cadenza and Finale (1990) for viola, cello, and piano
- Quartet for Strings and Piano (1983) for violin, viola, cello, and piano
- Quintet for Piano and Strings (1960) for 2 violins, viola, cello, and piano
- Serenade (1975) for flute, violin, viola, and cello
- String Quartet (#1) (1939) for 2 violins, viola, and cello
- String Quartet (#2) (1949) for 2 violins, viola, and cello
- String Sextet (1966) for 2 violins, 2 violas, and 2 cellos
- String Trio (1973) for violin, viola, and cello
- Trio (1951) for violin, cello, and piano
- Variations on a Fan-Fair (1965) for 2 trumpets, horn, and trombone

==== Duos ====
- Cavatina (1976) for treble viol and harpsichord
- Duo for Violin & Clarinet (1969) for clarinet and violin
- Duo for Violin & Harp (1959) for violin and harp
- Duo for Violin and 'Cello (1963) for violin and cello
- Elegy (1946) for violin and piano
- Fantasy for Two Pianos (1965) for 2 pianos
- Nocturne for 'Cello and Piano (1946) for cello and piano
- Pastoral Variations for Flute and Harp (1996) for flute and harp
- Prelude and Variations for Piano Four-Hands (1946) for piano four-hands
- Rhapsody (1947) for viola and piano
- Sonata for Violin and Piano (#1) (1940) for violin and piano
- Sonata for Violin and Piano (#2) (1948) for violin and piano
- Wedding Music (1977) for 2 trumpets

==== Solo strings ====
- Sonata for Unaccompanied Violin (1961) for violin solo
- Sonata for Violoncello Solo (1955) for cello solo
- Variations for Solo Viola (after 1996) for viola solo

==== Solo keyboard ====
- Another Page from a Diary (1985) for piano
- Etude for Either Hand, or Both (1963) for piano
- Fantasy (1950) for piano
- Fantasy on a Hebrew Theme (1947) for organ
- Fantasy on an Advent Hymn (1948) for organ with optional TBB chorus
- In Memoriam – R. D. W. (1951) for piano
- Page from a Diary (1977) for piano
- Piano Sonata (1947) for piano
- Prelude, Passacaglia and Fugue (1957) for piano
- Sphinxes (1974) for piano
- Twelve Bagatelles on the Triads (1959) for piano
- Twelve Tonal Studies (1962) for piano
- Twenty-One Little Preludes (1940) for piano
- Two Fugues for J. Merrill Knapp (1940) for organ

==== Cadenzas ====
- Cadenza for Bach's Concerto for Four Harpsichords, Strings & Continuo in A Minor (after Vivaldi, RV 580), BWV 1065 (1989) for 4 pianos
- Cadenzas for Mozart Concerto for 2 Pianos & Orchestra, E-flat Major, K. 365 (1997) for 2 pianos
- Cadenzas for Mozart Piano Concerto No. 21 in C major, K. 466 (1981) for piano

==== Completions ====
- Completion of a Cadenza for Beethoven's Piano Concerto in C Major, Opus 15 (1984) for piano
- Completion of Bach's Unfinished Fugue in C Minor (1974) for keyboard

=== Choral and solo vocal works ===
==== Chorus and orchestra ====
- Two Psalms for Chorus and Orchestra (1948) for SSATBB and orchestra

==== Chorus, solo voice, and orchestra ====
- The Hollow Men (1950) for TTBB, tenor & baritone soloists, winds, and percussion
- The Lotos-Eaters (1946) for TTBB, tenor & bass soloists, and orchestra

==== Chorus and small ensemble ====
- Around the Year (1956) for SATB, 2 violins, viola, and cello. Text by Walter de la Mare

==== Chorus and keyboard ====
- Fantasy on an Advent Hymn (1948) for organ with optional TBB
- In the Last Days (1957) for SATB and piano
- Let Us Now Praise Famous Men (1946) for TTBB, tenor solo, and organ
- A Memory (1947) for TTBB and piano
- Veni Creator Spiritus (1950) for TBB and organ

==== A capella chorus ====
- Excursions (1946) for SSATBB
- Petit Chant de Noel (1955) for SATBB. Text by Gabriel Vahanian.
- Songs of Innocence and Experience (after 1996) for SATB. Text by William Blake
- Three Miniatures (1948) for TTBB. Text by James Stephens
- Two Limericks (1965) for SATB
- Two Songs from Shakespeare (1972) for SATB

==== Solo voice and orchestra ====
- Dover Beach (1941) for baritone and orchestra
- The Duchess of Malfi (1954) for contralto, tenor, bass, and orchestra
- La Figlia che Piange (1962) for tenor and chamber orchestra

==== Solo voice and small ensemble ====
- Four Lyrics from Yeats (after 1996) for medium voice, 2 violins, viola, and cello. Text by W. B. Yeats.
- Ozymandias (1989) for soprano, oboe, clarinet, bassoon, and piano
- Philomela (1970) for soprano, flute, viola, and piano
- Scarabs (1948) for soprano, 2 violins, viola, and cello. Text by R. P. Blackmur.
- Two Gardens (1986) for soprano, 2 violins, viola, cello, and piano. Text by Joyce Carol Oates.

==== Solo voice and single instrument ====
- Bells in Tower at Evening Toll (1940) for voice and piano
- Cover Me Over, Clover (n.d.) for voice and piano. Text by Richard Eberhart
- Dover Beach (1941) for baritone and piano
- An Epitaph (1940) for voice and piano
- Four Songs from Mythical Story (1961) for soprano and piano
- If It Chance Your Eye Offend You (1940) for voice and piano
- In the Morning (1940) for voice and piano
- Into My Heart (1940) for voice and piano
- Loveliest of Trees (1940) for voice and piano
- Mona Lisa (1940) for voice and piano
- New Weather (1993) for tenor or soprano and piano. Text by Paul Muldoon.
- Nine Lyrics from Tennyson's "In Memoriam" (1978) for baritone and piano. Text by Alfred Tennyson
- Parta Quies (1940) for voice and piano
- Psalm CXXI (1973) for soprano and organ
- The Shell (1948) for contralto and piano
- Silent Noon (1959) for soprano and piano
- Sir Thomas' House (1948) for soprano and flute. Text by John Berryman.
- Solace (1990) for soprano and piano. Text by Richard Eberhart.
- The Street Sounds to the Soldier's Tread (1940) for voice and piano
- Three Songs from Pippa Passes (after 1996) for mezzo-soprano and piano. Text by Robert Browning.
- Triptych (1950) for tenor or soprano and piano. Text by John Berryman.
- Two Women (1987) for soprano and piano
- With Rue My Heart is Laden (1940) for voice and piano

== Books ==
- Musical Form and Musical Performance (New York, 1968)
- The Composer's Voice (Berkeley, 1974)
- Music: a View from Delft (Chicago, 1989)
- Hearing and Knowing Music: The Unpublished Essays of Edward T. Cone (Princeton, NJ, 2009)

== Edited volumes ==
- (ed., with Benjamin Boretz) Perspectives on Schoenberg and Stravinsky (Princeton, NJ, 1968, Revised 2nd ed. 1972)
- (ed.) Hector Berlioz: Fantastic Symphony (New York, 1971) (annotated score)
- (ed., with B. Boretz) Perspectives on American Composers (New York, 1971)
- (ed., with B. Boretz) Perspectives on Contemporary Music Theory (New York, 1972)
- (ed., with B. Boretz) Perspectives on Notation and Performance (New York, 1976)
- (ed.) Roger Sessions on Music (Princeton, NJ, 1979)
- (ed., with Edmund Keeley and Joseph Frank) "The Legacy of R. P. Blackmur: Essays, Memoirs, Texts" (New York, 1987)

== Articles and reviews ==
1940–49

- "Roger Sessions' String Quartet." Modern Music 18, no. 3 (1941): 159–63.
- "The Creative Artist in the University." American Scholar 16, no. 2 (1947): 192–200.
- Review of Paul Bowles: Six Preludes for Piano. Notes. 4. 4 (1947).
- Review of Paul Creston: Review of Five Two-Part Inventions for the Piano. Notes. 4. 2 (1947): 191–192.
- Review of David Diamond: Review of Sonatina for Piano. Notes. 4. 4 (1947).

1950–59

- Review of Carlos Riesco: Canzona E Rondo, for Violin and Piano. Notes. 11. 1 (1953): 155.
- Review of Tibor Serly: Sonata in Modus Lascivus, for Solo Violin. Notes. 11. 1 (1953): 155.
- Review of Berlioz: Romeo and Juliet, Complete Orchestral Score. (N. Y. Philharmonic-Symphony Orch., Mitropoulos) The Musical Quarterly. 39. 3 (1953): 475–478.
- Review of Berlioz: The Trojans in Carthage. (Ensemble Vocal de Paris, André Jouve, Hermann Scherchen, Orchestre de la Société des Concerts du Conservatoire) The Musical Quarterly. 39. 1 (1953): 138–141.
- "The Old Man's Toys: Verdi's Last Operas." Perspectives USA 6 (1954): 114–33. Reprinted in Cone, Music: A View from Delft, 159–75.
- "Words into Music: The Composer's Approach to the Text." In Sound and Poetry, edited by Northrop Frye, 3–15. English Institute Essays, 1956; New York, 1957. Reprinted in Cone, Music: A View from Delft, 115–23.
- Review of Robert Ward: Symphony No. Three; Stein: Three Hassidic Dances. (Cincinnati Symphony Orchestra, Thor Johnson, Robert Ward, and Stein) The Musical Quarterly. 42. 3 (1956): 423–425.
- Review of Roger Sessions: Second String Quartet; Colin McPhee: Concerto for Piano with Wind Octette Accompaniment. (New Music Quartet, Grant Johannesen, Carlos Surinach) The Musical Quarterly. 43. 1 (1957): 140–142.
- Review of Berlioz: L'Enfance Du Christ. (Boston Symphony Orchestra, Charles Munch, Cesare Valletti, Florence Kopleff, Gérard Souzay, Giorgio Tozzi, New England Conservatory Chorus, Lorna Cooke de Varon) The Musical Quarterly. 44. 2 (1958): 259–261.
- "Musical Theory as a Humanistic Discipline." Juilliard Review 5, no. 2 (1957–58): 3–12. Reprinted in Cone, Music: A View from Delft, 29–37.

1960–69

- "Analysis Today." The Musical Quarterly 46, no. 2 (1960): 172–88. Reprinted in Problems of Modern Music, edited by Paul Henry Lang, 34–40. New York, 1960. Also reprinted in Cone, Music: A View from Delft, 39–54.
- "Music: A View from Delft." The Musical Quarterly 47, no. 4 (1961): 439–53. Reprinted in Perspectives on Contemporary Music Theory, edited by Benjamin Boretz and Edward T. Cone, 57–71. New York, 1972. Also reprinted in Cone, Music: A View from Delft, 13- 27.
- "The Not-So-Happy Medium." The American Scholar 30, no. 2 (1961): 254–67. Reprinted in Essays Today, vol. 5, edited by Richard Ludwig, 87- 96. New York, 1962.
- "Stravinsky: The Progress of a Method." Perspectives of New Music 1, no. 1 (1962): 18–26. Reprinted in Perspectives on Schoenberg and Stravinsky, edited by Benjamin Boretz and Edward T. Cone, 155–64. New York, 1972. Also reprinted in Cone, Music: A View from Delft, 293–301.
- "The Uses of Convention: Stravinsky and His Models." The Musical Quarterly 48, no. 3 (1962): 287–99. Reprinted in Stravinsky: A New Appraisal of His Work, edited by Paul Henry Lang, 21- 33. New York, 1963. Also reprinted in Cone, Music: A View from Delft, 281–92.
- "From Sensuous Image to Musical Form." American Scholar 33, no. 3 (1964): 448- 62.
- "A Budding Grove." Perspectives of New Music 3, no. 2 (1965): 38–46.
- "On the Structure of 'Ich folge dir.'" College Music Symposium 5 (1965): 77–85.
- "Toward the Understanding of Musical Literature." Perspectives of New Music 4, no. 1 (1965): 141–51.
- "Conversations with Roger Sessions." Perspectives of New Music 4, no. 2 (1966): 29–46. Reprinted in Perspectives on American Composers, edited by Benjamin Boretz and Edward T. Cone, 90–107. New York, 1971.
- "The Power of The Power of Sound." Introductory essay in Edmund Gurney, The Power of Sound, i–xvi. New York, 1966.
- "Beyond Analysis." Perspectives of New Music 6, no. 1 (1967): 33–51. Reprinted in Perspectives on Contemporary Music Theory, edited by Benjamin Boretz and Edward T. Cone, 72–90. New York, 1972. Also reprinted in Music: A View from Delft, 55–75.
- "Webern's Apprenticeship." The Musical Quarterly 53, no. 1 (1967): 39–52. Reprinted in Music: A View from Delft, 267–80.
- "What is a Composition?" Current Musicology 5 (1967): 101–7.
- Review of Eric Walter White: Stravinsky – The Composer and His Works. Perspectives of New Music. 5. 2 (1967): 155–161.
- Review of Josef Rufer: Arnold Schönberg: Sämtliche Werke. Abteilung I, Reihe A, Band 1, Lieder Mit Klavierbegleitung. The Musical Quarterly. 53. 3 (1967): 416–420.
- "Conversation with Aaron Copland." Perspectives of New Music 6, no. 2 (1968): 57–72. Reprinted in Perspectives on American Composers, edited by Benjamin Boretz and Edward T. Cone, 131–46. New York, 1971.
- "Beethoven New-Born." American Scholar 38, no. 3 (1969); 389–400.
- Review of Donald N. Ferguson: The Why of Music. Notes. 26. 2 (1969): 258–260.

1970–79

- "Schubert's Beethoven." The Musical Quarterly 56, No.4 (1970): 779–93.
- Review of Reinhold Brinkmann: Arnold Schönberg: Drei Klavierstücke Op. 11. Studien Zur Frühen Atonalität Bei Schönberg." Notes. 27. 2 (1970): 267–268.
- "Radical Traditionalism." Listener 2229 (1971); 849.
- "Inside the Saint's Head; The Music of Berlioz." Musical Newsletter 1, no. 3 (July 1971); 3–12; 1, no. 4 (October 1971); 16–20; 2, no. 1 (January 1972); 19–22. Reprinted in Music: A View from Delft, 217–48.
- "In Honor of Roger Sessions." Perspectives of New Music 10, no. 2 (1972); 130–41.
- "Editorial Responsibility and Schoenberg's Troublesome 'Misprints.'" Perspectives of New Music 11, no. 1 (1972); 65- 75.
- Review of Roger Sessions: Review of Questions About Music. Perspectives of New Music. 10. 2 (1972): 164–170.
- "The Miss Etta Cones, the Steins, and M'sieu Matisse." The American Scholar 42, no. 3 (1973); 441- 60.
- "Bach's Unfinished Fugue in C minor." In Studies in Renaissance and Baroque Music in Honor of Arthur Mendel, edited by Robert L. Marshall, 149–55. London, 1974.
- "Sound and Syntax: An Introduction to Schoenberg's Harmony." Perspectives of New Music 13, no. 1 (1974): 21–40. Reprinted in Music: A View from Delft, 249–66.
- Review of Leonard B. Meyer: Explaining Music: Essays and Explorations." Journal of the American Musicological Society. 27. 2 (1974): 335–338.
- "In Defense of Song: The Contribution of Roger Sessions." Critical Inquiry 2, No.1 (1975): 93–112. Reprinted in Music: A View from Delft, 303–22.
- "Sessions' Concertino." Tempo 115 (1975): 2–10.
- "Yet Once More, 0 Ye Laurels." Perspectives of New Music 14, no. 2; 15, no. 1 (1976): 294–306.
- "Beatrice et Benedict." Boston Symphony Program (October 1977): 9–15.
- "Beethoven's Experiments in Composition: The Late Bagatelles." In Beethoven Studies, vol. 2, edited by Alan Tyson, 84–105. London, 1977. Reprinted in Music: A View from Delft, 179–200.
- "One Hundred Metronomes." The American Scholar 46, no. 4 (1977): 443–59.
- "Three Ways of Reading a Detective Story-Or a Brahms Intermezzo." Georgia Review 31, no. 3 (1977): 554–74. Reprinted in Cone, Music: A View from Delft, 77- 93.
- Review of Hector Berlioz: Review of New Edition of the Complete Works, 9: Grande Messe Des Morts. Notes. 36. 2 (1979): 464–465.

1980–89

- "Aunt Claribel's 'Blue Nude' Wasn't Easy to Like." Art News 79, no. 7 (1980): 162–63.
- "Berlioz's Divine Comedy: The Grande messe des morts." 19th-Century Music 4, no. 1 (1980): 3–16. Reprinted in Cone, Music: A View from Delft, 139–57.
- "The Authority of Music Criticism." Journal of the American Musicological Society 34, no. 1 (1981): 1–18. Reprinted in Cone, Music: A View from Delft, 95–112.
- "On the Road to Otello: Tonality and Structure in Simon Bocanegra." Studi Verdiana 1 (1982): 72–98.
- "Roger Sessions: Symphony No.6." San Francisco Symphony Stagebill (May 1982): v–ix.
- "Schubert's Promissory Note: An Exercise in Musical Hermeneutics." 19th Century Music 5, no. 3 (1982): 233- 41. Revised version reprinted in Schubert: Critical and Analytical Studies, edited by Walter Frisch, 13–30. Lincoln, 1986.
- "The Years at Princeton." The Piano Quarterly 119 (Robert Casadesus issue, 1982): 27–29.
- "A Cadenza for Op. 15." In Beethoven Essays: Studies in Honor of Elliot Forbes, edited by Lewis Lockwood and Phyllis Benjamin, 99–107. Cambridge, 1984.
- "Schubert's Unfinished Business." 19th-Century Music 7, no. 3 (1984): 222- 32. Reprinted in Cone, Music: A View from Delft, 201- 16.
- "Musical Form and Musical Performance Reconsidered." Music Theory Spectrum 7 (1985): 149–58.
- "A Tribute to Roger Sessions." Kent Quarterly 5, no. 2 (1986): 29–31.
- "Twelfth Night." Musiktheorie 1 (1986): 41–59. Reprinted in original English version in Journal of Musicological Research 7, nos. 2–3 (1987): 131–56.
- "Brahms: Songs with Words and Songs without Words." Integral 1 (1987): 31–56.
- "Dashes of Insight: Blackmur as Music Critic." In The Legacy of R. P. Blackmur, edited by Edward T. Cone, Joseph Frank, and Edmund Keeley, 10–12. New York: Ecco Press, 1987.
- "Music and Form." In What Is Music? An Introduction to the Philosophy of Music, edited by Philip Alperson, 131–46. University Park: Pennsylvania State University Press, 1994 (1987).
- "On Derivation: Syntax and Rhetoric." Music Analysis 6, no. 3 (1987): 237- 56.
- "The World of Opera and Its Inhabitants." In Cone, Music: A View from Delft, 125- 38.
- "Responses" (to "The Composer's Voice: Elaborations and Departures"). College Music Symposium 29 (1989): 75–80.

1990–99

- "Harmonic Congruence in Brahms." In Brahms Studies, edited by George S. Bozarth, 165–88. Oxford, 1990.
- "Poet's Love or Composer's Love?" In Music and Text, edited by S. P. Scher, 177- 92. Cambridge, 1992.
- "Ambiguity and Reinterpretation in Chopin." In Chopin Studies 2, edited by John Rink and Jim Samson, 140- 60. Cambridge, 1994.
- "Thinking (about) Music." Proceedings of the American Philosophical Society, 138, no. 4 (1994): 469–75.
- "Edward T. Cone Makes a Plea for Good Citizenship." Musical Times 135, no. 12 (December 1994): 734–38.
- Review of Nicholas Cook: Music, Imagination, and Culture." Music Theory Spectrum. 16. 1 (1994): 134–138.
- "The Pianist as Critic." In The Practice of Performance: Studies in Musical Interpretation, edited by John Rink, 241–53. Cambridge, 1995.
- "Attacking a Brahms Puzzle." Musical Times 136, no. 2 (February 1995): 72- 77.
- "Adding Up Beauty and Truth" (Article Review of Edward Rothstein: Emblems of Mind: The Inner Life of Music and Mathematics). Yale Review 83, no. 4 (October 1995): 121- 34.
- "'Am Meer' Reconsidered: Strophic, Binary, Ternary." In Schubert Studies 5, edited by Brian Newbould, 112- 26. Aldershot, 1998.

2000–09

- "Repetition and Correspondence in Schwanengesang." In Companion to Schubert's Schwanengesang, edited by Martin Chusid, 53- 89. New Haven, 2000.
