= Charles Munch discography =

Alsatian conductor Charles Munch was one of the most widely recorded symphonic conductors of the twentieth century. Here is a partial list of his recordings.

== Partial list of sound recordings by Charles Munch ==
=== Recordings made with the Amsterdam Concertgebouw Orchestra for Decca ===
- 1948 Brahms: Violin Concerto in D major, Op.77 Violinist: Ossy Renardy, also released by LYS
- 1948 Saint-Saëns: Danse macabre Violinist: Ossy Renardy

=== Recording made with the Bavarian Radio and Television Orchestra for Deutsche Grammophon ===
- 1968 Berlioz: Requiem, Op. 5 with the Bavarian Radio and Television Orchestra Chorus and Soloist: Peter Schreier

=== Broadcasts from Tokyo of the Boston Symphony Orchestra released by Altus ===
- 1960 Samuel Barber: Medea Meditation and Dance of Vengeance
- 1960 Ludwig van Beethoven: Symphony No. 5
- 1960 Hector Berlioz: Rackoczky March
- 1960 Hector Berlioz: Symphonie Fantastique
- 1960 Easley Blackwood: Symphony No. 1
- 1960 Claude Debussy: La Mer
- 1960 Georg Frideric Handel: Water Music, Andante and Alla hornpipe
- 1960 Japanese National Anthem: Kimi Ga Yo
- 1960 Felix Mendelssohn: Octet - Scherzo
- 1960 Walter Piston: Symphony No. 6
- 1960 Maurice Ravel: Daphnis et Chloé, Suite No. 2
- 1960 Albert Roussel: Bacchus and Ariane, Suite No. 2
- 1960 Francis Scott Key: Star Spangled Banner
- 1960 Richard Wagner: Die Meistersinger – Act III Excerpts

=== Broadcasts from Moscow of the Boston Symphony Orchestra released by Ars Nova ===
- 1956 Dukas: The Sorcerer's Apprentice
- 1956 Haydn: Symphony No. 102 in B-flat Major, Hob.I-102
- 1956 Ravel: Daphnis et Chloé, Suite No. 2, same as Arte release
- 1956 Richard Strauss: Don Juan, Op. 20

=== Broadcast from Moscow of the Boston Symphony Orchestra released by Arte ===
- 1956 Beethoven: Symphony No. 3 in E-Flat Major, Op. 55
- 1956 Ravel: Daphnis et Chloé, Suite No. 2, same as Arts Nova release
- 1956 Schumann: Symphony No. 2 in C Major, Op. 61, Adagio

=== Broadcasts of the Boston Symphony Orchestra from Symphony Hall Centennial Set released by the Boston Symphony Orchestra ===
- 1953 Auber: La Muette de Portici Overture, same as West Hill Radio Archives release
- 1953 Prokofiev: Love for Three Oranges March and Scherzo
- 1958 Roussel: Suite in F Op. 33
- 1959 Fauré: Pénélope Overture, same as Music & Arts release
- 1959 Franck: Le Chasseur Maudit (The Accursed Hunter)
- 1962 Debussy: La Mer
- 1962 Ravel: La Valse

=== Broadcast from Tanglewood of the Boston Symphony Orchestra released by the Boston Symphony Orchestra ===
- 1953 Richard Strauss: Don Quixote, Op. 35 Cellist: Gregor Piatigorsky, Violist: Joseph de Pasquale, and Violinist: Richard Burgin

=== Broadcast from Edinburgh of the Boston Symphony Orchestra released by ICA ===
- 1956 Haydn: Symphony No. 102 in B flat Major, Hob.I-102

=== Broadcast of the Boston Symphony Orchestra released by Living Stage ===
- 1958 Honegger: Symphony No. 3

=== Broadcasts of the Boston Symphony Orchestra released by Memories ===
- 195? Brahms: Violin Concerto in D Minor, Op. 77 with Joseph Szigeti
- 1952 Mozart: Symphony No. 41 in C, K. 551, Jupiter, same as West Hill Radio Archives release
- 1954 Mozart: Symphony No. 31 in D major, K. 297, Paris
- 1956 Beethoven: Piano Concerto No. 3 in c, Op. 37 with Clara Haskil, same West Hill Radio Archives and Music & Arts releases
- 1958 Bruckner: Symphony No. 7 in E Major, WAB 107
- 1958 Mozart: Symphony 35 in D major, K. 385 "Haffner"
- 1959 Mozart: Symphony 38 In D Major, K. 504, "Prague"
- 1959 Mozart: Symphony 40 In G Minor, K. 550
- 1961 Berlioz: Roméo et Juliette, Op. 17 with the Berkshire Festival Chorus and Soloists: Florence Kopleff, Donald Gramm, and John McCollum
- 1961 Ravel: La Valse
- 1962 Mozart: Requiem in D Minor, K. 626 with Phyllis Curtin, Florence Kopleff, Blake Stern, Mac Morgan, and Berkshire Festival Chorus
- 1962 Mozart: Symphony 36 in C, K 425, "Linz"
- 1962 Ravel: Daphnis et Chloé with Berkshire Festival Chorus

=== Broadcast from Prague of the Boston Symphony Orchestra released by Multisonic ===
- 1956 Brahms: Symphony No. 2 in D Major, Op. 73
- 1956 Honegger: Symphony No. 3

=== Broadcasts of the Boston Symphony Orchestra released by Music & Arts ===
- 1956 Beethoven: Piano Concerto No. 3 in C minor, Op. 37 with Clara Haskil, same as Memories and West Hill Radio Archives releases
- 1956 Mozart: Piano Concerto No. 9 in E-flat, K. 271 with Clara Haskil
- 1956 Wagner: Die Walkure, Act One: Margaret Harshaw, Albert Da Costa, and Jan Pierce
- 1959 Fauré: Pelléas et Mélisande Suite, Op. 80
- 1959 Fauré: Pénélope Overture, same as BSO release
- 1959 Franck: Le Chasseur maudit (The Accursed Hunter)
- 1960 Fauré: Ballade for Piano and Orchestra with Nicole Henriot-Schweitzer
- 1961 Franck: Symphonic Variations with Vlado Perlemuter
- 1961 Franck: Symphony in D minor
- 1961 Ravel: Daphnis et Chloé, with chorus of Berkshire Festival
- 1962 Debussy: Nocturnes
- 1962 Debussy: Printemps
- 1962 Debussy: La mer
- 1962 Ravel: La valse

=== Recordings made with the Boston Symphony Orchestra for Pristine Classics (RCA recordings, unless noted) ===
- 1949 Beethoven: Gratulations Menuet W.o.O.3
- 1949 Schubert: Symphony No. 2 in B-flat Major, D.12
- 1950 Brahms: Symphony No. 4 in E Minor, Op. 98
- 1951 Schumann: Symphony No. 1 in B-flat Major, Op. 38, Spring
- 1953 Auber: La Muette de Portici Overture, Symphony Hall Broadcast
- 1953 Carl Nielsen: Symphony 5, Symphony Hall Broadcast
- 1955 Wagner: Tannhäuser, Elisabeth's Aria - 'Dich Teure Halle' Soprano: Margaret Hershaw, Symphony Hall Broadcast
- 1955 Wagner: Der Fliegende Hollander, Senta's Ballad - 'Jo ho ho hoe!', Soprano: Margaret Hershaw, Symphony Hall Broadcast
- 1955 Wagner: Götterdämmerung - Brunhilde's Immolation, Soprano: Margaret Hershaw, Symphony Hall Broadcast
- 1956 Benjamin Britten: Variations on a Theme by Frank Bridge, Symphony Hall Broadcast
- 1956 Debussy: Prélude à l'après-midi d'un faune with Flutist Doriot Anthony Dwyer
- 1957 Bloch: Schelomo Cellist: Gregor Piatigorsky
- 1958 d'Indy: Symphonie sur un chant montagnard français (Symphony on a French Mountain Air) Pianist: Nicole Henriot-Schweitzer
- 1958 Alexei Haieff: Symphony No. 2
- 1958 Ravel: Piano Concerto in G Major Pianist: Nicole Henriot-Schweitzer
- 1957 Walton: Cello Concerto Cellist: Gregor Piatigorsky
- 1957 Wagner: Götterdämmerung - Brunhilde's Immolation Soloist: Eileen Farrell
- 1958 Vaughan Williams: Symphony No. 8 in D minor, Tanglewood broadcast
- 1959 Mendelssohn: Violin Concerto Violinist: Jascha Heifetz
- 1960 Dvořák: Cello Concerto in B Minor, Op. 104 Cellist: Gregor Piatigorsky

=== Broadcast of the Boston Symphony Orchestra released by Tahra ===
- 1951 Tchaikovsky: Violin Concerto in D Major, Op.35, (1st movement only) Violinist: Michèle Auclair
- 1956 Barber: Adagio for Strings, Op. 11
- 1956 Ludwig van Beethoven: Symphony No. 3 Eroica in E
- 1956 Brahms: Symphony No. 2 in D Major, Op. 73
- 1956 Claude Debussy: La Mer, L. 109
- 1961 Brahms: Variations on a Theme by Haydn, Op. 56
- 1961 Tchaikovsky: Symphony No. 6, "Pathetique", Op. 74
- 1962 Mozart: Requiem: Phyllis Curtin, Florence Kopleff, Blake Stern, Mac Morgan, and Berkshire Festival Chorus

=== Broadcasts of the Boston Symphony Orchestra released by West Hill Radio Archives ===
- 1951 Richard Strauss: Tod und Verklärung
- 1952 Beethoven: Concerto No. 5 in E-flat Emperor, Pianist: Lélia Gousseau
- 1952 Honegger: La Danse des Morts, Soloist: Betty Allen, Mariquita Moll, Arnold Moss and Gérard Souzay with New England Conservatory Chorus
- 1952 Mendelssohn; Symphony No. 4 in A, Italian
- 1952 Mozart: Symphony No. 41 in C, K. 551. Jupiter, same as Memories release
- 1952 Schubert: Symphony No. 5 in B-flat
- 1952 Schubert: Symphony No. 8 in B minor, Unfinished
- 1952 Wagner: Tristan and Isolde – Prelude & Liebestod
- 1953 Auber: La Muette de Portici Overture, same as BSO release
- 1953 Beethoven: Symphony No. 2 in D
- 1953 Beethoven: Symphony No. 3 in E-flat, Eroica
- 1953 Brahms: Piano Concerto No. 2 in B-flat, Pianist: Claudio Arrau
- 1953 Debussy: Ibéria
- 1953 Lalo: Symphonie Espagnole, (Missing Movement III), Violinist: Ruth Posselt
- 1953 Ravel: Le Tombeau de Couperin
- 1953 Richard Strauss: Divertimento (after Couperin)
- 1953 Wagner: Die Meistersinger – Act III Excerpts
- 1954 Beethoven: Symphony No. 7 in A, Op. 92
- 1954 Beethoven: Violin Concerto in D, Op. 61, Violinist: Zino Francescatti
- 1954 Berlioz: Beatrice and Benedict Overture
- 1954 Berlioz: Harold in Italy Violist: Joseph de Pasquale
- 1954 Brahms: Variations on a Theme by Haydn
- 1954 Dvořák: Symphony No. 9 in E minor, From the New World, Op. 95
- 1954 Ibert: Flute Concerto, Flutist: Doriot Anthony Dwyer
- 1954 Saint-Saëns: Symphony No. 3 in C minor "Organ", Organist: E. Power Biggs
- 1954 Richard Strauss: Allerseelen, Wiegenlied, Morgen, Ständchen, Soprano: Irmgard Seefried
- 1954 Wagner: Eine Faust Overture
- 1955 Beethoven: Violin Concerto in D, Op. 61, Violinist: Jascha Heifetz
- 1955 Beethoven: Die Weihe des Hauses, Op. 124: Overture
- 1954 Berlioz: Les nuits d'été Soprano: Victoria de los Ángeles
- 1955 Brahms: Symphony No. 2 in D, Op. 73 (9/30/55)
- 1955 Debussy: La Damoiselle élue Soprano: Victoria de los Ángeles with Radcliffe Choral Society
- 1955 Milhaud: Symphony No. 6
- 1955 Ravel: Introduction and Allegro for Harp, Flute, Clarinet, and Strings, Harp: Bernard Zighera, Flute: Doriot Anthony Dwyer, and Clarinet: Gino Cioffi
- 1955 Ravel: Rapsodie espagnole
- 1955 Roussel: Suite in F
- 1955 Schumann: Symphony No. 2 in C
- 1955 Richard Strauss: Don Juan, Op. 20
- 1956 Beethoven: Leonore Overture No. 2, Op. 72
- 1956 Beethoven: Piano Concerto No. 3 in C minor, Op. 37, Pianist: Clara Haskil
- 1956 Beethoven: Symphony No. 3 Eroica in E
- 1956 Beethoven: Symphony No. 6 Pastoral in F, Op. 68
- 1956 Brahms: Concerto for Piano and Orchestra No. 1 in D minor, Op. 15, Pianist: Rudolf Serkin
- 1956 Brahms: Concerto for Violin, Cello and Orchestra in A minor, Violinist: Zino Francescatti and Cellist: Samuel Mayes
- 1956 Fauré: Requiem, Adele Addison, Donald Gramm, Harvard Glee Club and Radcliffe Choral Society
- 1956 Schumann: Symphony No.4 in D minor, Op.120
- 1957 Beethoven: Piano Concerto No. 5 Emperor in E flat, Op. 73. Pianist: Claudio Arrau
- 1957 Brahms: Academic Festival Overture, Op. 80
- 1957 Debussy: Images pour orchestre
- 1957 Franck: Symphony in D Minor
- 1957 Schumann: Cello Concerto in A minor, Op. 129, Cellist: Pierre Fournier
- 1957 Richard Strauss: Ein Heldenleben, Violinist: Richard Burgin
- 1958 Berlioz: Le Corsaire Overture
- 1958 Debussy: Jeux
- 1958 Debussy: La Mer
- 1958 d'Indy: Symphonie sur un chant montagnard français (Symphony on a French Mountain Air) Pianist: Nicole Henriot-Schweitzer (the Conductor's niece)
- 1958 Ravel: La Valse
- 1958 Ravel: Piano Concerto in G Major Pianist: Nicole Henriot-Schweitzer
- 1958 Ravel: La valse
- 1955 Ravel: Rapsodie Espagnole
- 1958 Ravel: Valses nobles et sentimentales
- 1960 Beethoven: Creatures of Prometheus - Excerpts
- 1960 Beethoven: Piano Concerto No. 1 in C Major, Op. 15 Pianist: Sviatoslav Richter
- 1960 Brahms: Piano Concerto No. 2 in B-flat, Op. 98 Pianist: Sviatoslav Richter

=== Recordings made with the Boston Symphony Orchestra for RCA Victor ===
- 1949 Beethoven: Symphony No. 7 in A Major, Op. 92, same as Tahra release
- 1949 Beethoven: Gratulations Menuet W.o.O.3, same as Tahra release
- 1949 Schubert: Symphony No. 2 in B-flat Major, D.125
- 1949 Berlioz: Beatrice et Benedict Overture
- 1950 Beethoven: Symphony No. 1 in C Major, Op. 15
- 1950 Brahms: Symphony No. 4 in E Minor, Op. 98
- 1950 Haydn: Symphony No. 103 in E-flat Major, Hob.I-103
- 1950 Haydn: Symphony No. 104 in D Major, Hob.I-104
- 1950 Handel arranged by Sir Hamilton Harty: Water Music Suite
- 1950 Ravel: Rapsodie Espagnole
- 1950 Ravel: La Valse
- 1950 Lalo: Le Roi d'Ys Overture
- 1951 Bruch: Violin Concerto No. 1 in G Minor, Op.26 Violinist: Yehudi Menuhin
- 1951 Mozart: Le nozze di Figaro Overture
- 1951 Saint-Saëns: La Princesse Jaune Overture
- 1951 Schumann: Symphony No. 1 in B-flat Major, Op. 38, Spring
- 1951 Schumann: Genoveva Overture, Op. 81
- 1952 Brahms: Piano Concerto No. 2 in B-flat, Op. 98 Pianist: Arthur Rubinstein
- 1952 Honegger: Symphony No. 5, Di tre Re
- 1952 Ravel: Pavane pour une infante défunte
- 1952 Roussel: Bacchus et Ariane, Suite No. 2
- 1953 Berlioz: Romeo and Juliet, Op. 17 with the Harvard Glee Club and Radcliffe Choral Society and Soloists: Margaret Roggero, Leslie Chabay, and Yi-Kwei Sze
- 1953 Honegger: Symphony No. 2
- 1953 Richard Strauss: Don Quixote, Op. 35 Cellist: Gregor Piatigorsky, Violist: Joseph de Pasquale, and Violinist: Richard Burgin
- 1953 Tchaikovsky: Violin Concerto in D Major, Op.35 Violinist: Nathan Milstein
- 1954 Berlioz: La damnation de Faust with the Harvard Glee Club and Radcliffe Choral Society and Soloists Suzanne Danco, David Poleri, Martial Singher and Donald Gramm (added to the National Recording Registry for 2005)
- 1954 Berlioz: Symphonie Fantastique
- 1954 Chopin: Piano Concerto No. 2 in F Minor, Op. 21 Pianist: Alexander Brailowsky
- 1954 Menotti: Violin Concerto Violinist: Tossy Spivakovsky
- 1954 Saint-Saëns: Piano Concerto No. 4 in C Minor, Op. 44 Pianist: Alexander Brailowsky
- 1955 Beethoven: Violin Concerto Violinist: Jascha Heifetz
- 1955 Beethoven: Symphony No. 5 in C Minor, Op. 67
- 1955 Beethoven: Symphony No. 6 in F major, Op. 68
- 1955 Berlioz: Nuits d'été, soprano Victoria de los Ángeles, also released by Testament
- 1955 Brahms: Symphony No. 2 in D Major, Op. 73
- 1955 Brahms: Tragic Overture, Op. 81
- 1955 Chausson: Poème Violinist: David Oistrakh
- 1955 Debussy: La Damoiselle élue with the Radcliffe Choral Society Soloists Victoria de los Ángeles and Carol Smith, also released by Testament
- 1955 Ravel: Daphnis et Chloé, with the New England Conservatory Chorus
- 1955 Ravel: La valse
- 1955 Saint-Saëns: Introduction and Rondo Capriccioso Violinist: David Oistrakh
- 1955 Schubert: Symphony No. 8 in B minor, D 759 The Unfinished
- 1955 Tchaikovsky: Symphony No. 4 in F Minor, Op.36
- 1956 Beethoven: Coriolan Overture, Op. 62
- 1956 Beethoven: Fidelio Overture, Op. 72b
- 1956 Beethoven: Leonore Overture No. 1, Op. 138
- 1956 Beethoven: Leonore Overture No. 2, Op. 72
- 1956 Beethoven: Leonore Overture No. 3, Op. 72a
- 1956 Berlioz: L'Enfance du Christ (issued in mono only on RCA Victor Red Seal LP; issued in stereo on RCA Victrola LP and CD), with the New England Conservatory Chorus and soloists Florence Kopleff, Giorgio Tozzi, Cesare Valletti and Gerard Souzay
- 1956 Brahms: Symphony No. 1 in C Minor, Op. 68
- 1956 Debussy: La Mer
- 1956 Debussy: Le Martyre de Saint Sebastien with the New England Conservatory Chorus Soloists Florence Kopleff, Catherine Akos, Phyllis Curtin, and Charles Münch
- 1956 Debussy: Prélude à l'après-midi d'un faune with Flutist Doriot Anthony Dwyer
- 1956 Ibert Escales
- 1956 Martinů: Symphony No. 6 Fantaisies Symphoniques
- 1956 Mozart: Mozart at Tanglewood: Clarinet Concerto, and Quintet, with Clarinetist: Benny Goodman, Cellist: Samuel Mayes, Violist: Joseph de Pasquale, and Violinist: Richard Burgin and Alfred Krips
- 1956 Piston: Symphony No. 6
- 1956 Ravel: Bolero
- 1956 Ravel: Rapsodie Espagnole
- 1956 Tchaikovsky: Francesca da Rimini, Op. 32
- 1956 Tchaikovsky: Romeo and Juliet Fantasy Overture
- 1957 Johann Sebastian Bach: Brandenburg Concertos No.1 - 6, BWV1046-1051
- 1957 Barber: Medea's Meditation and Dance of Vengeance, Op. 23a
- 1957 Barber: Adagio for Strings, Op. 11
- 1957 Beethoven: Symphony No. 3 in E-Flat Major, Op. 55
- 1957 Bloch: Schelomo Cellist: Gregor Piatigorsky, also released by Testament
- 1957 Debussy: Images pour orchestre
- 1957 Dukas: The Sorcerer's Apprentice
- 1957 Elgar: Introduction and Allegro for Strings, Op. 47
- 1957 Franck: Symphony in D Minor
- 1957 Mendelssohn: Symphony No. 3
- 1957 Mendelssohn: Symphony No. 5
- 1957 Prokofiev: Piano Concerto No. 2 in G Minor, Op. 16 Pianist: Nicole Henriot-Schweitzer
- 1957 Prokofiev: Romeo and Juliet - excerpts, Op. 64a/b and Op. 101
- 1957 Rachmaninoff: Piano Concerto No. 3 in D Minor, Op. 30 Pianist: Byron Janis
- 1957 Saint-Saëns: Omphale's Spinning Wheel, Op. 31
- 1957 John Stafford Smith: Star Spangled Banner
- 1957 Tchaikovsky: Serenade for Strings, Op. 48
- 1957 Walton: Cello Concerto Cellist: Gregor Piatigorsky
- 1957 Wagner: Götterdämmerung - Brunhilde's Immolation Soloist: Eileen Farrell
- 1957 Wagner: Götterdämmerung - Siegfried's Rhine Journey
- 1957 Wagner: Tannhäuser - Overture and Bacchanale (Paris Version)
- 1957 Wagner: Tristan and Isolde - Prelude and Liebestod Soloist: Eileen Farrell
- 1957 Wagner: Die Walküre - The Magic Fire Music
- 1958 Beethoven: Symphony No. 8 in F Major, Op. 93
- 1958 Berlioz: Beatrice et Benedict Overture
- 1958 Berlioz: Le carnaval romain Overture, Op. 9
- 1958 Berlioz: Le corsaire Overture, Op. 21
- 1958 Berlioz: Harold in Italy, Op. 16, Violist: William Primrose
- 1958 Easley Blackwood: Symphony No. 1
- 1958 Brahms: Piano Concerto No. 1 in D Minor, Op. 15 Pianist: Gary Graffman
- 1958 d'Indy: Symphonie sur un chant montagnard français (Symphony on a French Mountain Air) Pianist: Nicole Henriot-Schweitzer (the Conductor's niece)
- 1958 Alexei Haieff: Symphony No. 2
- 1958 Mahler: Kindertotenlieder Soloist: Maureen Forrester
- 1958 Mahler: Songs of the Wayfarer Soloist: Maureen Forrester
- 1958 Ravel: Mother Goose Suite
- 1958 Ravel: Piano Concerto in G Major Pianist: Nicole Henriot-Schweitzer
- 1958 Mendelssohn: Symphony No. 4
- 1958 Schubert: Symphony No. 9, D 944 The Great
- 1958 Beethoven: Symphony No. 9 in D Minor, Op. 125 The Choral with the New England Conservatory Chorus and soloists Leontyne Price, Maureen Forrester, David Poleri, and Giorgio Tozzi
- 1959 Berlioz: Benvenuto Cellini Overture, Op. 23
- 1959 Berlioz: Requiem, Op. 5 with the New England Conservatory Chorus and Soloist: Léopold Simoneau
- 1959 Berlioz: Les Troyens - Royal Hunt and Storm Music
- 1959 Mendelssohn: Violin Concerto Violinist: Jascha Heifetz
- 1957 Prokofiev: Violin Concerto No. 2 in G Minor, Op. 63 Violinist: Jascha Heifetz
- 1959 Schumann: Symphony No. 1 in B-flat Major, Op. 38, Spring
- 1959 Schumann: Manfred Overture, Op. 115
- 1959 Tchaikovsky: Violin Concerto in D Major, Op.35 Violinist: Henryk Szeryng.
- 1959 Saint-Saëns: Symphony No. 3 (Organ Symphony) Organist: Berj Zamkochian
- 1959 Bach: Violin Concerto No.1, BWV1041, Violinist: Jamie Laredo
- 1960 Beethoven: Creatures of Prometheus - Excerpts
- 1960 Beethoven: Piano Concerto No. 1 in C Major, Op. 15 Pianist: Sviatoslav Richter
- 1960 Chopin: Piano Concerto No. 1 in C Minor, Op. 11 Pianist: Gary Graffman
- 1960 Dvořák: Cello Concerto in B Minor, Op. 104 Cellist: Gregor Piatigorsky
- 1960 Mendelssohn: Capriccio Brillant in B Minor, Op. 22 Pianist: Gary Graffman
- 1960 Mendelssohn: Octet - Scherzo in E-flat Major, Op. 20, arranged for strings
- 1960 Milhaud: La Création du Monde Op. 81
- 1960 Milhaud: Suite Provençale Op. 152b
- 1960 Poulenc: Concerto for Organ, Strings, and Timpani Organist: Berj Zamkochian and Timpanist: Everett Firth
- 1960 Schubert: Symphony No. 2 in B-flat Major, D.125
- 1960 Stravinsky Jeu de cartes
- 1961 Berlioz: Romeo and Juliet, Op. 17 with the New England Conservatory Chorus and Soloists: Rosalind Elias, Cesare Valetti, and Giorgio Tozzi
- 1961 Dvořák: Symphony No. 8 in G Major, Op. 88
- 1961 Ravel: Daphnis et Chloé, with the New England Conservatory Chorus
- 1961 Richard Strauss: Till Eulenspiegel's Merry Pranks, Op. 28
- 1961 Tchaikovsky: Romeo and Juliet Fantasy Overture
- 1962 Tchaikovsky: Symphony No. 6 in B Minor, Op.74
- 1962 Berlioz: Symphonie Fantastique
- 1962 Chausson: Symphony
- 1962 Debussy: Nocturnes - Nuages and Fetes
- 1962 Debussy: Printemps
- 1962 Debussy: Prélude à l'après-midi d'un faune Flutist: Doriot Anthony Dwyer
- 1962 Franck: Le Chasseur Maudit (The Accursed Hunter)
- 1962 Ravel: Bolero (No. 17 US)
- 1962 Ravel: La Valse
- 1962 Ravel: Pavane pour une infante défunte
- 19?? Schumann: Piano Concerto, Pianist: Van Cliburn (Never Issued)

=== Broadcasts of the Chicago Symphony Orchestra released by the Chicago Symphony Orchestra's From the Archives Series ===
- 1963 Rameau orchestrated by d'Indy: Dardanus Suite
- 1966 Roussel: Bacchus et Ariane, Suite No. 2
- 1967 Roussel: Symphony No. 3 in G Minor, Op. 42

=== Recording made with the Czech Philharmonic for Multisonic ===
- 1957 Honegger: Symphony No. 2

=== Recording made with the Czech Philharmonic for Praga ===
- 1957 Franck: Symphony in D minor

=== Recording made with freelance orchestra of London musicians for His Master's Voice ===
- 1935 Saint-Saëns: Piano Concerto No. 4 in C Minor, Op. 44 Pianist: Alfred Cortot

=== Recording made with freelance orchestra of Paris musicians for, also released by A Classical Record, His Master's Voice ===
- 1941 Georg M. Hoffman: Meine Seele Ruhmt und Priest Soloist: Pierre Bernac

=== Recording made with the Hungarian Radio and Television Orchestra for Philips ===
- 1966 Berlioz: Symphonie Fantastique

=== Recordings made with London Philharmonic for Decca ===
- 1947 Roussel: The Spider's Banquet, also released by LYS
- 1947 Roussel: Suite in F Op. 33, also released by LYS
- 1947 Bizet: Symphony in C
- 1947 Bizet: Jolie Fille de Perth - Danse bohémienne

=== Broadcast of the NBC Symphony released by Memories, same as Music & Arts set ===
- 1954 Debussy: Ibéria
- 1954 Ravel: Le Tombeau de Couperin
- 1954 Roussel: Bacchus et Ariane, Suite No. 2

=== Broadcast of the NBC Symphony released by Music & Arts, same as Memories set ===
- 1954 Debussy: Iberia
- 1954 Ravel: Le Tombeau de Couperin
- 1954 Roussel: Bacchus et Ariane, Suite No. 2

=== Recordings made with the New Philharmonia Orchestra for Decca ===
- 1966 Offenbach, arranged by Manuel Rosenthal: Gaîté Parisienne
- 1966 Bizet: L'Arlésienne Suite
- 1966 Bizet: Carmen Suite
- 1967 Respighi: Fontane di Roma
- 1967 Respighi: Pini di Roma

=== Recordings made with the New York Philharmonic for Columbia Records ===
- 1947 Saint-Saëns: Symphony No. 3. Soloist: E. Niels-Berger
- 1948 d'Indy: Symphonie sur un chant montagnard français Pianist: Robert Casadesus
- 1948 Mozart: Piano Concerto No. 21 in C Major, KV 467 Pianist: Robert Casadesus

=== Broadcast of the New York Philharmonic issued by LYS ===
- 1948 Chabrier: Bourrée fantasque
- 1948 d'Indy: Symphonie sur un chant montagnard français Pianist: Robert Casadesus
- 1948 Liszt: Piano Concerto No. 2 Pianist: Robert Casadesus
- 1948 Mozart: Symphony No. 35 in D Major Haffner

=== Broadcasts of the New York Philharmonic released by Music & Arts ===
- 1949 Chausson: Poème Violinist: Ginette Neveu
- 1949 Ravel: Daphnis et Chloé, Suite No. 2
- 1949 Ravel: Tzigane Violinist: Ginette Neveu

=== Recordings made with the New York Philharmonic for Pristine Classics ===
- 1947 Saint-Saëns: Symphony No. 3. Soloist: E. Niels-Berger, same as Columbia release
- 1948 d'Indy: Symphonie sur un chant montagnard français Pianist: Robert Casadesus, same as Columbia release
- 1948 Mozart: Piano Concerto No. 21 in C Major, KV 467 Pianist: Robert Casadesus, same as Columbia release
- 1948 Chabrier: Bourrée fantasque, same as LYS release
- 1948 Liszt: Piano Concerto No. 2 Pianist: Robert Casadesus, same as LYS release
- 1948 Mozart: Symphony No. 35 in D Major Haffner, same as LYS release

=== Recordings made with the Orchestre de l'Association des Concerts Lamoureux for Erato ===
- 1965 Dutilleux: Symphony No. 2, Le double
- 1965 Lalo: Cello Concerto in D Minor Cellist: André Navarra
- 1965 Roussel: Suite in F Major, Op. 33
- 1965 Roussel: Symphony No. 3 in G Minor, Op. 42
- 1965 Roussel: Symphony No. 4 in A Major, Op. 53
- 1965 Saint-Saëns: Cello Concerto No. 1 in A Minor, Op. 33 Cellist: André Navarra

=== Recordings (Live) made with the Orchestre de Paris on Altus ===
- 1967 Berlioz: Symphonie Fantastique
- 1967 Debussy: "La Mer"
- 1967 Stravinsky: Requiem Canticles

=== Recordings made with the Orchestre de Paris for EMI/Angel ===
- 1967 Berlioz: Symphonie Fantastique
- 1967 Brahms: Symphony No. 1 in C Minor, Op. 68
- 1967 Honegger: Symphony No. 2
- 1967 Ravel: Bolero
- 1967 Ravel: Daphnis et Chloé Suite No. 2
- 1968 Ravel: Pavane pour une infante défunte
- 1968 Ravel: Piano Concerto in G Major Pianist: Nicole Henriot-Schweitzer
- 1968 Ravel: Rapsodie Espagnole

=== Recordings made with the Orchestre national de France for Auvidis-Valois, previously issued on Disques Montaigne* ===
- 1962 Debussy: La Mer*
- 1962 Debussy: Iberia*
- 1962 Debussy: Fantasy for Piano and Orchestra Pianist: Nicole Henriot-Schweitzer*
- 1962 Dutilleux: Symphony No. 2Le Double*
- 1962 Honegger: Symphony No. 1*
- 1962 Honegger: Le Chant de Nigamon
- 1962 Honegger: Pastorale d'été
- 1962 Roussel: Bacchus et Ariane, Suite No. 2*
- 1963 Beethoven: Symphony No. 7 in A Major, Op. 92
- 1963 Beethoven: Consecration of the House Overture, Op. 124
- 1963 Berlioz: Symphonie fantastique
- 1964 Beethoven: Symphony No. 4 in B-flat Major, Op. 60
- 1964 Honegger: Symphony No. 2
- 1964 Honegger: Symphony No. 5, Di tre Re
- 1964 Roussel: Symphony No. 3 in G Minor, Op. 42
- 1964 Sibelius: Lemminkäinen Suite (The Swan of Tuonela, Lemminkäinen's Return), Op. 22
- 1965 Brahms: Symphony No. 2 in D Major, Op. 73
- 1966 Berlioz: Benvenuto Cellini Overture, Op. 23
- 1966 Fauré: Pelléas et Mélisande Suite Op. 80
- 1966 Roussel: Symphony No. 4 in A Major, Op. 53
- 1966 Roussel: Bacchus et Ariane, Suite No. 2
- 1966 Schumann: Symphony No. 4 in D Major, Op. 120
- 1967 Berlioz: Le corsaire Overture, Op. 21
- 1967 Franck: Symphony in D Minor

=== Broadcast made with the Orchestre national de France for Cascavelle ===
- 1953 Berlioz: Roméo et Juliette Op. 17., Soloists: Irma Kolassi, Joseph Peyron, Lucien Lovano with National Orchestra Chorus of Radio France

=== Broadcasts of the Orchestre national de France for Euromuses ===
- 1958 Schmitt: Symphony No. 2
- 1962 Debussy: Fantasy for Piano and Orchestra, Pianist: Nicole Henriot-Schweitzer

=== Recordings made with the Orchestre national de France for His Master's Voice ===
- 1949 Berlioz: Symphonie Fantastique, also released by A Classical Recording, LYS, TAHRA, and Warner
- 1957 Schumann: Piano Concerto, Pianist: Samson François

=== Recordings made with the Orchestre national de l'O.R.T.F. for Accord ===
- 1961 Barraud: Symphony No. 3
- 1961 Roussel: Bacchus et Ariane, Suite No. 2
- 1962 Debussy: Ibéria
- 1962 Debussy: La mer
- 1962 Debussy: Trois Nocturnes

=== Recordings made with the Orchestre national de l'O.R.T.F., reissued by Eloquence Australia ===
- 1961 Barraud: Symphony No. 3
- 1961 Roussel: Bacchus et Ariane, Suite No. 2

=== Recordings made with the Orchestre national de l'O.R.T.F. for Erato and Warner ===
- 1965 Roussel: Suite in F Op. 33
- 1967 Dutilleux: Métaboles
- 1967 Honegger: Symphony No. 4 Deliciae basiliensis

=== Broadcast made with the Orchestre national de l'O.R.T.F. for Music & Arts ===
- 1951 Saint-Saëns: Violin Concerto No. 3 in B minor, Op. 61, Violinist: Zino Francescatti

=== Recordings made with the Orchestre national de l'O.R.T.F. for Turnabout(?) and Scribendum ===
- 1966 Albéniz: Iberia
- 1966 Debussy: Iberia
- 1966 Debussy: La Mer
- 1966 Debussy: Prélude à l'Après-midi d'un faune
- 1967 Bizet: Jeux d'Enfants
- 1967 Bizet: Patrie Overture
- 1967 Bizet: Symphony in C
- 1967 Borodin: In the Steppes of Central Asia
- 1967 Mussorgsky: Khovanchina - Introduction and Persian Dance
- 1967 Rimsky-Korsakov: Golden Cockerel - Introduction and Cortège des noces
- 1967 Rimsky-Korsakov: Russian Easter Festival Overture

=== Broadcast of the Orchestre Philharmonique de la R.T.F. for Euromuses ===
- 1962 Roussel: Suite in F, op. 33

=== Recordings made with the Orchestre de la Société des Concerts du Conservatoire for Decca ===
- 1946 Berlioz: Benvenuto Cellini Overture, Op. 23
- 1946 Fauré: Pavane, Op. 50
- 1946 Franck: Symphonic Variations, with Eileen Joyce, also released by LYS
- 1946 Franck: Symphony in D minor, also released by LYS
- 1946 Ravel: Boléro, also released by LYS
- 1946 Ravel: Daphnis et Chloé Suites 1 and 2, also released by LYS
- 1946 Roussel: Petite Suite Op. 39, also released by LYS
- 1946 Saint Saëns: Omphale's Spinning Wheel, Op. 31, also released by LYS
- 1947 Beethoven: Symphony No. 8 in F major
- 1947 Debussy: Ibéria, also released by LYS
- 1947 Debussy: Berceuse héroïque, also released by LYS
- 1947 d'Indy: Fervaal Prelude, Op. 40, also released by LYS
- 1947 Fauré: Pelléas et Mélisande Suite, Op. 80
- 1947 Mendelssohn: Symphony No. 5, Reformation, also released by LYS
- 1947 Prokofiev: Symphony No. 1, Op. 25, also released by LYS
- 1948 Berlioz: Le corsaire Overture, Op. 21
- 1948 Tchaikovsky: Symphony No. 6 in B minor, Op. 74, also released by LYS
- 1949 Berlioz: Romeo and Juliet excerpts, Op. 9
- 1949 Berlioz: Les Troyens - "Royal Hunt and Storm Music"
- 1949 Ravel: Piano Concerto, pianist: Nicole Henriot-Schweitzer

=== Recordings made with the Orchestre de la Societe des Concerts du Conservatoire for His Master's Voice and Warner ===
- 1939 Bloch: Violin Concerto in A minor, Violinist: Joseph Szigeti
- 1939 Ravel: Concerto for the Left Hand, Pianist: Alfred Cortot, also released by LYS
- 1939 Vivaldi orchestrated by Dandelot: Violin Concerto in D Major, Op. 3, No. 9, Violinist: D. Soriano
- 1939 Mozart: Violin Concerto No. 7 in D major, K. 217a, Violinist: D. Soriano
- 1939 Gabriel Faure: Bercuse for Violin and Orchestra, Violinist: D. Soriano
- 1941 Delannoy: La pantoufle de vair : Danse des négrillons et Apothéose (Grand Suite on the ballet, Cinderella) Violinist: Henri Merkel, also released by A Classical Record, Malibran, and LYS
- 1941 Delannoy: Sérénade concertante for Violin Violinist: Henri Merkel, also released by A Classical Record, Malibran, and LYS
- 1941 Franz Liszt: Piano Concerto No. 1 in E-flat major, S. 124, Pianist: Joseph Benenuti
- 1941 Gustave Samazeuilh: Le Cercle des heures, Mezzo Soprano, Eliette Schenneberg
- 1941 Gustave Samazeuilh: Nuit, also released by A Classical Record
- 1941 Ernesto Halffter: Rapsodia Portugesa Pianist: Marguerite Long, also released A Classical Record and LYS
- 1941 Honegger: La Danse des Morts with Jean-Louis Barrault, Odette Turba-Rabier, Charles Panzéra and Elaine Schenneberg with chorus, also released by LYS
- 1941 Mozart: Violin Concerto No. 5, K. 219, Violinist: Jacques Thibaud
- 1942 Debussy La mer, also released by A Classical Record and LYS
- 1942 Honegger: Symphony No. 2, also released by A Classical Record and LYS
- 1942 Mozart: Piano Concerto No. 20, K. 466, Pianist: Jean Doyen, also released by A Classical Record and LYS
- 1942 Ravel: La valse, also released by A Classical Record and LYS
- 1942 Ravel: Pavane pour une infante défunte, also released by A Classical Record and LYS
- 1942 Ravel: Concerto for the Left Hand, Pianist: Jacques Février, also released by LYS
- 1942 Tchaikovsky: Piano Concerto No. 1, Pianist: Kostia Kostantinov, also released by LYS
- 1944 Beethoven: Piano Concerto No. 5, Op. 73,The Emperor, Pianist: Marguerite Long, also released by A Classical Record
- 1946 Louis Aubert: Habanera, also released by A Classical Record and LYS
- 1946 Chopin orchestrated by Louis Aubert: La Nuit ensorcelée (Enchanted Night), also released by A Classical Record
- 1946 Jolivet: Les Trois complaintes du soldat vaincu (Three Laments of the Defeated Soldier) Soloist: Pierre Bernac also released by A Classical Record

=== Recordings made with the Orchestre de la Societe des Concerts du Conservatoire for Oiseau-Lyre ===
- 1938 Haydn: Sinfonia Concertante for Violin, Cello, Oboe and Bassoon, with Roland Charmy, André Navarra, Myrtil Morel, Fernand Oubradous, also released by A Classical Record

=== Recording made with the Paris Philharmonic for Polydor ===
- 1938 Ravel: Concerto for the Left Hand, Pianist: Jacqueline Blancard
- 19?? Widor: Fantasy for Piano and Orchestra, Pianist: Marcelle Herrenschmidt

=== Recordings made with the Philadelphia Orchestra for Columbia Records ===
- 1963 Berlioz: La Damnation de Faust - Danse des follets, Danse des sylphes, Marche hongroise
- 1963 Fauré: Pelléas et Mélisande Suite, Op. 80
- 1963 Ravel: Valses nobles et sentimentales

=== Broadcast of the Philadelphia Orchestra released on the Philadelphia Orchestra's Centennial Set ===
- 1963 Ravel: Daphnis et Chloé Suite No. 2

=== Recordings (Live) made with the Prague Radio Symphony Orchestra issued by Panton ===
- 1967 Martinů: Symphony No. 6 Fantaisies Symphoniques

=== Broadcast of the RAI Symphony Orchestra released by Tahra ===
- 1951 Beethoven: Symphony No. 6 Pastorale
- 1951 Debussy: La Mer

=== Recording made with the Rotterdam Philharmonic for Turnabout(?) and Scribendum ===
- 1962 Franck: Symphony in D minor
- 1967 Beethoven: Symphony No. 6 Pastorale

=== Recording made with the Royal Philharmonic Orchestra for Reader's Digest ===
- 1963 Bizet: Symphony in C
- 1963 Tchaikovsky: Francesca da Rimini, Op.32

=== Broadcast of the Symphony of the Air released by Music & Arts ===
- 1957 Debussy: La Mer

=== Recording of the USSR State Academic Orchestra released by Meloydia ===
- 1965 Debussy: La Mer
- 1965 Honegger: Symphony No. 2
- 1965 Rameau orchestrated by d'Indy: Dardanus Suite
- 1965 Roussel: Bacchus et Ariane, Suite No. 2

=== Recordings Lacking Full Information ===
- 19?? Debussy: La Mer, one movement, Orchestra:?, Supraphon
- 19?? Martinů: Symphony No. 6 Fantaisies Symphoniques, one movement, Orchestra:?, Supraphon

The Supraphon recordings were part of "45" record that was a bonus insert in a booklet-length biography(?) of Munch in Czech issued by Supraphon. The Boston Symphony Orchestra Archives has the booklet and recording with the details.

== Video of Charles Münch on DVD ==
=== DVD with the Boston Symphony on ICA ===
- 1958 Anton Bruckner: Symphony No. 7 in E Major
- 1958 Claude Debussy: La Mer
- 1958 Felix Mendelssohn: Symphony No. 4 in A Major, Op. 90
- 1958 Wolfgang Amadeus Mozart: Symphony No. 36, "Linz"
- 1958 Ravel: Mother Goose Suite
- 1959 Beethoven: Symphony No. 5 in C minor, Op. 67
- 1959 Fauré: Pelléas et Mélisande Suite, Op. 80
- 1959 Joseph Haydn: Symphony No. 98 in B flat Major, Hob.1:98
- 1959 Felix Mendelssohn: Symphony No. 3 in A minor, Op. 56
- 1959 Wolfgang Amadeus Mozart: Masonic Funeral Music K477/479a
- 1959 Wolfgang Amadeus Mozart: Symphony No. 38, "Prague"
- 1959 Robert Schumann: Symphony No. 2 in C Major, Op. 61
- 1960 Beethoven: Creatures of Prometheus, excerpts, Op. 43
- 1960 Johannes Brahms: Symphony No. 2 in D Major, Op. 73
- 1960 Georg Frideric Handel/Hamilton Harty: Water Music Suite
- 1960 Richard Wagner: Die Meistersinger – Act III Excerpts
- 1961 Beethoven: Symphony No. 4 in B flat major, Op. 60
- 1961 Johannes Brahms: Symphony No. 1 in C minor, Op. 68
- 1961 Claude Debussy: Ibéria
- 1961 Franck: Symphony in D Minor
- 1961 Robert Schumann: Overture to Genoveva, Op. 81
- 1962 Franz Schubert: Symphony No. 5 in B flat major, D485

=== DVD with the Boston Symphony on NHK ===
- 1960 Japanese National Anthem: Kimi Ga Yo
- 1960 John Stafford Smith: Star Spangled Banner
- 1960 Beethoven: Symphony No. 3 in E-Flat Major, Op. 55
- 1960 Ravel: Daphnis et Chloé Suite No. 2

=== DVD with the Boston Symphony on VAI ===
- 1962 Berlioz: Symphonie Fantastique
- 1962 Debussy: La Mer
- 1962 Ravel: Daphnis et Chloé Suite No. 2
- 1966 Berlioz: L'Enfance du Christ with the Harvard Glee Club and Radcliffe Choral Society and Soloists Donald Gramm, Florence Kopleff, Donald Meanders, John McCollum, and Theodor Uppman

=== DVD with the Chicago Symphony Orchestra on VAI ===
- 1963 Berlioz: Les Troyens - Royal Hunt and Storm Music
- 1963 Rameau orchestrated by d'Indy: Dardanus Suite
- 1963 Ravel: La Valse
- 1963 Ravel: Valses nobles et sentimentales

=== DVD with the Orchestre National de l'ORTF on EMI classics ===
- 1966 Brahms: Symphony No. 1 in C Minor, Op. 68 (Movements II through IV only)
- 1966 Ravel: Daphnis et Chloé Suite No. 2

=== DVD with the Orchestre de Radio-Canada on VAI ===
- 1963 Berlioz: Symphonie Fantastique

=== DVD The Art of Conducting Volume II on EMI ===
- 1957 Franck: Symphony in D Minor - excerpts with the Czech Philharmonic
- 1962 Berlioz: Symphonie Fantastique - excerpts with Boston Symphony
- 1962 Debussy: La Mer - excerpts with Boston Symphony
- 1962 Ravel: Daphnis et Chloé Suite No. 2 - excerpts with Boston Symphony
- 1966 Berlioz: Symphonie Fantastique - excerpts with the Hungarian Radio and Television Orchestra
