= The Palace at 4 a.m. =

1932 surrealist sculpture by Alberto Giacometti

- Artist: Alberto Giacometti
- Year: 1932
- Catalogue: 80928
- Type: Sculpture
- Dimensions: 63.5 cm × 71.8 cm × 40 cm (25.0 in × 28.3 in × 16 in)
- Location: Museum of Modern Art; New York
- Accession: 90.1936

The Palace at 4 a.m. (French: Le palais à quatre heures du matin) is a 1932 surrealist sculpture by Alberto Giacometti. It is in the Museum of Modern Art, in New York.

Giacometti said the work relates to "a period of six months passed in the presence of a woman who, concentrating all life in herself, transported my every moment into a state of enchantment. We constructed a fantastical palace in the night — a very fragile palace of matches. At the least false movement, a whole section would collapse. We always began it again."

== Literary influence ==
William Maxwell in So Long, See You Tomorrow (1980) links The Palace at 4 a. m. to the narrator's house while it is being built. It is mainly a scaffold structure which he and Cletus climb all over in the evenings. Maxwell uses Giacometti's own description of his inspiration for the piece to convey the freedom and wonder of the boys in this structure.
