= My True Love Sings =

Studio album by Robert Shaw Chorale
- Released: 1956
- Label: RCA

My True Love Sings is a 1956 LP by the Robert Shaw Chorale, conducted by Robert Shaw.

== Soundtrack ==
The album contains the following songs:

=== Side 1 ===
1. Annie Laurie, Alicia Ann Spottiswoode, words attributed to William Douglass
2. Jeanie with the Light Brown Hair, English traditional, words by Stephen Foster
3. When love is kind, words Thomas Moore, Thomas Pyle, baritone
4. Johnny Has Gone for a Soldier, traditional Irish and American folk song, Louisa Natale, coloratura soprano
5. I Know My Love, Irish traditional
6. Comin' Thro' the Rye, words Robert Burns, Jane Craner, mezzo-soprano
7. Black, black, black is the color of my true love's hair, Appalachian traditional song, Clayton Krehbiel, tenor
8. Da unten im Thale, Bavarian folksong
9. Flow gently, sweet Afton, Jonathan E. Spilman, words Robert Burns, Thomas Motto, tenor

=== Side 2 ===
1. Treue Liebe, German traditional
2. Adiós, Catedral de Burgos, Spanish traditional, Florence Kopleff, contralto
3. Auprès de ma blonde, French traditional
4. He's gone away, American traditional, Louisa Natale, coloratura soprano
5. A Red, Red Rose, Scottish traditional, words Robert Burns, William Diard, tenor
6. Al olivo, Spanish traditional
7. In stiller Nacht, German traditional, words Friedrich Spee von Langenfeld
8. The soldier boy, American traditional, Jane Craner, mezzo-soprano
9. Fa una canzone, composer Orazio Vecchi
