= So Long, See You Tomorrow =

So Long, See You Tomorrow may refer to:

- So Long, See You Tomorrow (novel), 1980
- So Long, See You Tomorrow (album), 2014
