= James Laughlin =

American poet (1914–1997)

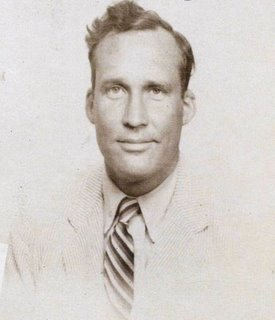
- Born: October 30, 1914; Pittsburgh, Pennsylvania, U.S.
- Died: November 12, 1997 (aged 83); Norfolk, Connecticut, U.S.
- Education: Harvard University
- Known for: publisher, poet
- Spouse: Gertrude Huston (m. 1990)
- Awards: Robert Frost Medal (1990)

James Laughlin (October 30, 1914 – November 12, 1997) was an American poet and literary book publisher who founded New Directions Publishing.

== Early life ==
He was born in Pittsburgh, the son of Henry Hughart and Marjory Rea Laughlin. Laughlin's family had made its fortune with the Jones and Laughlin Steel Company, founded three generations earlier by his great grandfather, James H. Laughlin, and this wealth would partially fund Laughlin's future endeavors in publishing. As Laughlin once wrote, "none of this would have been possible without the industry of my ancestors, the canny Irishmen who immigrated in 1824 from County Down to Pittsburgh, where they built up what became the fourth largest steel company in the country. I bless them with every breath." Laughlin's boyhood home is now part of the campus of Chatham University.

== Education ==
At The Choate School (now Choate Rosemary Hall) in Wallingford, Connecticut, Laughlin showed an early interest in literature. An important influence on Laughlin at the time was the Choate teacher and translator Dudley Fitts, who later provided Laughlin with introductions to prominent writers such as Gertrude Stein and Ezra Pound. Harvard University, where Laughlin matriculated in 1933, had a more conservative literary bent, embodied in the poet and professor Robert Hillyer, who directed the writing program. According to Laughlin, Hillyer would leave the room when either Pound or Eliot was mentioned.

== Career ==
In 1934, Laughlin traveled to France, where he met Gertrude Stein and Alice B. Toklas. Laughlin accompanied the two on a motoring tour of southern France and wrote press releases for Stein's upcoming visit to the U.S. He proceeded to Italy to meet and study with Ezra Pound, who famously told him, "You're never going to be any good as a poet. Why don't you take up something useful?" Pound suggested publishing. Later, Laughlin took a leave of absence from Harvard and stayed with Pound in Rapallo for several months. When Laughlin returned to Harvard, he used money from his father to found New Directions, which he ran first from his dorm room and later from a barn on his Aunt Leila Laughlin Carlisle's estate in Norfolk, Connecticut. (The firm opened offices in New York soon after, first at 333 Sixth Avenue and later at 80 Eighth Avenue, where it remains today.) With funds from his graduation gift, Laughlin endowed New Directions with more money, ensuring that the company could stay afloat even though it did not turn a profit until 1946.

The first publication of the new press, in 1936, was New Directions in Prose & Poetry, an anthology of poetry and writings by authors such as William Carlos Williams, Ezra Pound, Elizabeth Bishop, Henry Miller, Marianne Moore, Wallace Stevens, and E. E. Cummings, a roster that heralded the fledgling company's future as a preeminent publisher of modernist literature. The volume also included a poem by "Tasilo Ribischka," a pseudonym for Laughlin himself. New Directions in Prose and Poetry became an annual publication, issuing its final number in 1991.

Within just a few years New Directions had become an important publisher of modernist literature. Initially, it emphasized contemporary American writers with whom Laughlin had personal connections, such as William Carlos Williams and Pound. A born cosmopolitan, though, Laughlin also sought out cutting-edge European and Latin American authors and introduced their work to the American market. One important example of this was Hermann Hesse's novel Siddhartha, which New Directions initially published in 1951. Laughlin often remarked that the popularity of Siddhartha subsidized the publication of many other money-losing books of greater importance.

Although of draft age, Laughlin avoided service in World War II due to a 4-F classification. Laughlin, like several of his male ancestors and like his son Robert, suffered from depression. Robert committed suicide in 1986 by stabbing himself multiple times in the bathtub. Laughlin later wrote a poem about this, called Experience of Blood, in which he expresses his shock at the amount of blood in the human body. Despite the horrific mess left as a result, Laughlin reasons that he cannot ask anyone else to clean it up, "because after all, it was my blood too."

A natural athlete and an avid skier, Laughlin traveled the world skiing and hiking. With money from his graduation gift, he founded the Alta Ski Area in Utah and was part-owner of the resort there for many years. Laughlin also spearheaded the surveying of the Albion-Sugarloaf ski area, along with Alta notables Chic Morton, Alf Engen, and fellow Ski Enthusiast and Painter Ruth Rogers-Altmann. At times Laughlin's skiing got in the way of his business. After publishing William Carlos Williams' novel White Mule in 1937, Laughlin left for an extended ski trip. When reviewers sought additional copies of the novel, Laughlin was not available to give the book the push it could have used, and as a result Williams nursed a grudge against the young publisher for years. Laughlin's outdoor activities helped other literary friendships, though; for many years he and Kenneth Rexroth took an annual camping trip together in the Sierra Nevada mountains of California. In the 1960s, Laughlin published Rexroth's friend, the poet and essayist Gary Snyder, also an avid outdoorsman.

In the early 1950s, Laughlin took part in what has come to be known as the Cultural Cold War against the Soviet Union. With funding from the Ford Foundation and with the assistance of poet and editor Hayden Carruth, Laughlin founded a nonprofit called "Intercultural Publications" that sought to publish a quarterly journal of American arts and letters, Perspectives U.S.A., in Europe. Sixteen issues of the journal eventually appeared. Although Laughlin wished to continue the journal, the Ford Foundation cut off funding, asserting that Perspectives had limited impact and that its money would be better spent on the more effective Congress for Cultural Freedom. Following the dissolution of Intercultural Publications, Laughlin became deeply involved in the activities of the Asia Society.

Pound's advice to Laughlin to give up poetry didn't stick. He published his first book of poetry, Some Natural Things, in 1945, and continued to write verse until his death. Although he never enjoyed the acclaim that the writers he published received, Laughlin's verse (which is plainspoken and focused on everyday experience, reminiscent of Williams or even the Roman poet Catullus) was well-respected by other poets, and in the 1990s The New Yorker published six of his poems. Among his other books are In Another Country, The Country Road, and the posthumous autobiographical poem Byways.

Laughlin won the 1992 Distinguished Contribution to American Letters Award from the National Book Awards Program. The Academy of American Poets' James Laughlin award, for a poet's second book, is named in his honor.

== Personal life ==
Laughlin married three times. He was first married to Margaret Keyser for a decade; the couple had two children. In 1955, Laughlin married Anne Clark Resor, and with her also had two children. Laughlin met Gertrude Huston in 1945 at a Halloween dance party. Huston worked as a book designer and art director for New Directions. The pair married on December 5, 1990. He corresponded with literary critic and poet M. Bernetta Quinn.

Laughlin died of complications related to a stroke in Norfolk, Connecticut, at age 83.

== Works ==
Laughlin's works include:

- The river (1938)
- In Another Country (1979)
- Selected Poems (1986)
- The House of Light (1986)
- Tabellae (1986)
- The Owl of Minerva (Copper Canyon Press, 1987)
- Collemata and Pound As Wuz (1988)
- The Bird of Endless Time (Copper Canyon Press, 1989)
- Collected Poems of James Laughlin (1992)
- Angelica (1992)
- The Man in the Wall (1993)
- The Country Road (1995)
- The Secret Room (1997)
- A Commonplace Book of Pentastichs (1998)
- Byways: A Memoir (2005)
- The Way It Wasn't: From the Files of James Laughlin (2006)

Laughlin's correspondence with William Carlos Williams, Henry Miller, Thomas Merton, Delmore Schwartz, Ezra Pound, and others has been published in a series of volumes issued by Norton.

One of Laughlin's most anthologized works is "Step on His Head", a poem about his relationship with his children.
