= Gertrude Huston =

American artist and book designer (1919–1998)

- Born: 1919; New York City, U.S.
- Died: August 26, 1998 (aged 78–79); Norfolk, Connecticut, U.S.
- Education: Parsons School of Design
- Occupations: Artist; illustrator
- Known for: Designing book covers for New Directions Publishing
- Spouse: James Laughlin (m. 1990; died 1997)

Gertrude Huston (1919 – August 26, 1998) was an American artist and illustrator known for designing book covers for New Directions.

== Early life and education ==
Gertrude Huston was born in New York City in 1919 and grew up in New York and Wilton, Connecticut.

Huston graduated from Parsons School of Design.

== Career ==
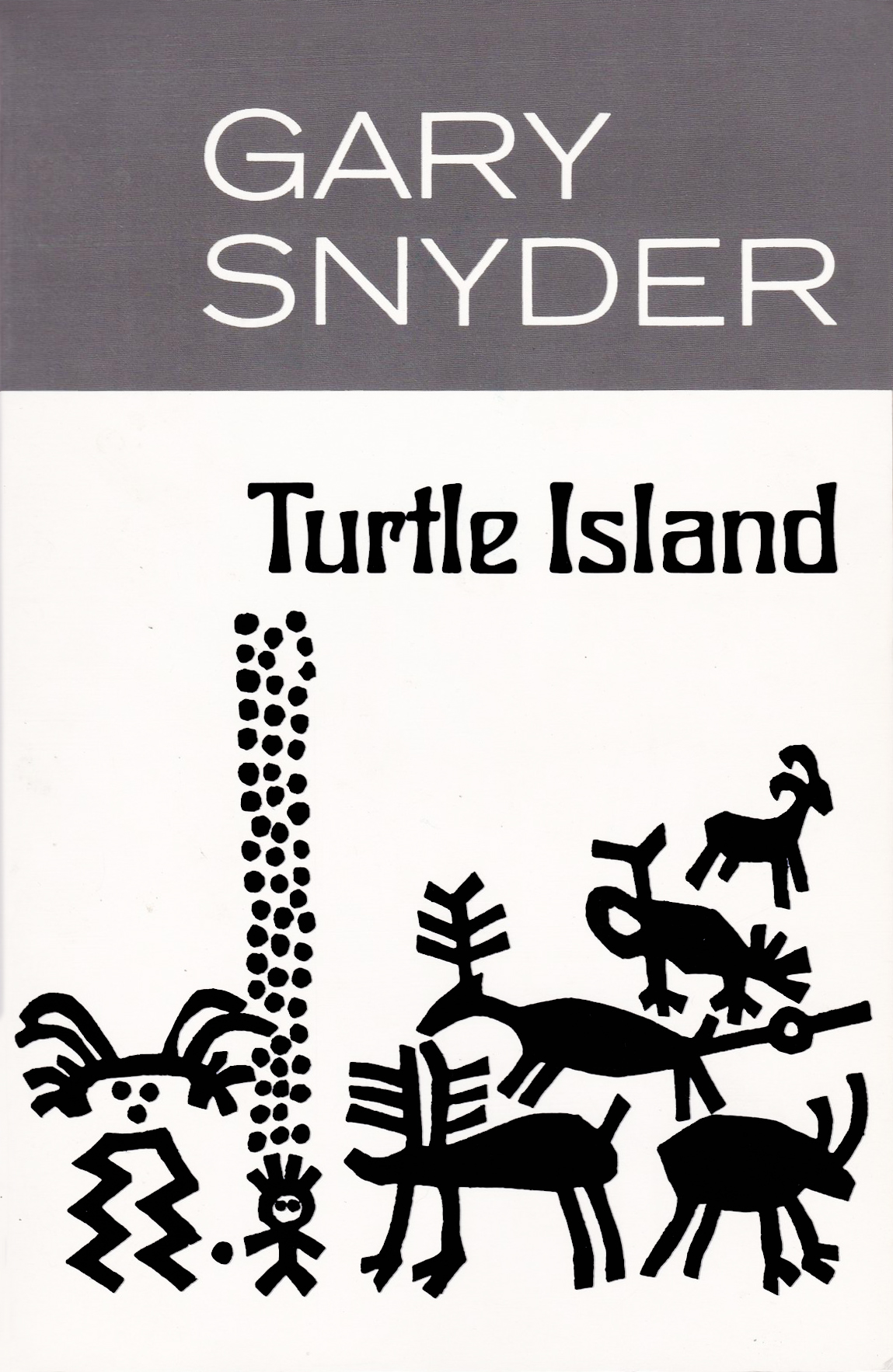
Turtle Island by Gary Snyder, designed by Gertrude Huston.

Huston worked at the Helena Rubinstein salon in New York. After a tenure at Lucien Long in Chicago, Huston returned to New York City to work at Blaker Advertising Agency. Huston was also a contract employee at the Ford Foundation.

Huston began designing books for New Directions on a freelance basis. She designed books for the publishing company from the late 1940s through the late 1970s. She also served as Art Director of New Directions.

In his book "Literchoor Is My Beat": A Life of James Laughlin, Publisher of New Directions, Ian S. MacNiven describes Huston's book design style:

"Her covers suggested the influence of Alvin Lustig but tended more toward the whimsical: for the second printing of Thomas's Portrait of the Artist as a Young Dog, she made a line drawing of a show-clipped French poodle, anglicized with a pipe and derby, sitting at a typewriter. It was humorous, but it certainly was not Dylan."

Huston ended her regular work with New Directions in 1978, after a clash with Dan Allman — then head of book design — over the design of H.D.'s End to Torment: A Memoir of Ezra Pound. She continued to design book covers for the publishing company only occasionally afterwards.

Outside of her book design work, Huston served as the secretary of Community Board No. 5 in Manhattan. She was active at the Midtown South Police Precinct Community Council and Encore Community Services at St. Malachy's Church. She served as president of the Rose Hill Neighborhood Association. A fan of jazz music, Huston was a member of the Duke Ellington Society, and lobbied to have Ellington formally memorialized in New York City.

=== Selected New Directions books designed by Huston ===
- The Blood Oranges by John Hawkes
- The Selected Poems of Irving Layton
- Sun Rock Man by Cid Corman
- Arrival: Book 1 of Daily Lives in Aghsi-Altai by Robert Nichols
- The Delights of Turkey: Twenty Tales by Edouard Roditi
- The Asian Journal of Thomas Merton by Thomas Merton
- The Way of Chuang Tzu by Thomas Merton
- A Dark Stranger by Julien Gracq
- Portrait of the Artist as a Young Dog (second ed.) by Dylan Thomas

=== Other books designed by Huston ===
- In Another Country by James Laughlin

== Personal life ==
Huston lost a husband in World War Two. Huston met New Directions founder James Laughlin at a Halloween dance party in 1945. The pair maintained an affair through both of Laughlin's earlier marriages, though they married on December 5, 1990.

== Death ==
Gertrude Huston died in Norfolk, Connecticut, on August 26, 1998, after a long illness.
