= William Maxwell (American writer) =

American journalist and writer (1908–2000)

- Born: William Keepers Maxwell Jr. August 16, 1908; Lincoln, Illinois, U.S.
- Died: July 31, 2000 (aged 91); New York City, U.S.
- Education: University of Illinois Urbana-Champaign (BA); Harvard University (MA)
- Occupations: Editor; novelist; short story writer
- Writing career
- Genre: Domestic realism

William Keepers Maxwell Jr. (August 16, 1908 – July 31, 2000) was an American editor, novelist, short story writer, essayist, children's author, and memoirist. He served as a fiction editor at The New Yorker from 1936 to 1975. An editor devoted to his writers, Maxwell became a mentor and confidant to many authors.

== Early life ==
Maxwell was born in Lincoln, Illinois, on August 16, 1908. His parents were William Keepers Maxwell and Eva Blossom (née Blinn) Maxwell. During the 1918 flu epidemic, the 10-year-old Maxwell became ill and survived, but his mother died. After his mother's death, the boy was sent to live with an aunt and uncle in Bloomington, Illinois. His father remarried, and young Maxwell joined him in Chicago. He attended Senn High School. He received his B.A. summa cum laude from the University of Illinois in 1930 where he was class salutatorian, elected to Phi Beta Kappa, poetry editor of The Daily Illini, and a member of Sigma Pi fraternity. Maxwell earned an A.M. at Harvard University. Maxwell briefly taught English at the University of Illinois where he served as faculty advisor to his fraternity and published an article about it in the fraternity's magazine before moving to New York.

== Career ==
Maxwell was best known for being a fiction editor of The New Yorker magazine for thirty-nine years (1936–1975), where he worked with writers such as Sylvia Townsend Warner, Vladimir Nabokov, John Updike, J. D. Salinger, John Cheever, Mavis Gallant, Frank O'Connor, Larry Woiwode, Maeve Brennan, John O'Hara, Eudora Welty, Shirley Hazzard, and Isaac Bashevis Singer. Welty wrote of him as an editor: "For fiction writers, he was the headquarters."

He also wrote six novels, short stories and essays, children's stories, and a memoir, Ancestors (1972). His fiction has recurring themes of childhood, family, loss, and lives changed quietly and irreparably. Much of his work is autobiographical, particularly concerning the loss of his mother when he was 10 years old and growing up in rural Midwestern United States. After the flu epidemic, young Maxwell had to move away from his house, which he referred to as the "Wunderkammer", or "Chamber of Wonders". He spoke of his loss: "It happened too suddenly, with no warning, and we none of us could believe it or bear it ... the beautiful, imaginative, protected world of my childhood swept away."

In 1968, Maxwell was elected president of the National Institute of Arts and Letters.

Maxwell was a friend and correspondent of the English writer Sylvia Townsend Warner, and was her literary executor. He edited a volume of her letters, and a further volume of his correspondence with her, The Element of Lavishness, was published in 2001.

Since his death in 2000, several biographical works about him have been published, including A William Maxwell Portrait: Memories and Appreciations (W. W. Norton & Co., 2004), My Mentor: A Young Man's Friendship with William Maxwell by Alec Wilkinson (Houghton-Mifflin, 2002), and William Maxwell: A Literary Life by Barbara Burkhardt (University of Illinois Press, 2005).

In 2008, the Library of America published the first of two collections of works by Maxwell, Early Novels and Stories, edited by Christopher Carduff. His collected edition of Maxwell's fiction, published to mark the writer's centenary, was completed by publication of the second volume, Later Novels and Stories, in the fall of 2008.

== Personal life ==
William Maxwell married Emily Gilman Noyes of Portland, Oregon. Emily Maxwell was an accomplished painter, winning the Medal of Honor in 1986 from the National Association of Women Artists. She also reviewed children's books for The New Yorker. The couple were married for 55 years. Maxwell died eight days after his wife. They had two daughters, Katherine and artist and curator Emily Brooke "Brookie" Maxwell. William Maxwell died on July 31, 2000, in New York City. The epitaph marking his memorial gravestone in Oregon reads, "The Work Is the Message".

== Bibliography ==
=== Novels ===
- Bright Center of Heaven (1934)
- They Came Like Swallows (1937) (Note: Autobiographical novella about the cruel impact of the 1918 flu epidemic, as seen through the eyes of an 8-year-old Midwestern child and his family.)
- The Folded Leaf (1945)
- Time Will Darken It (1948)
- The Chateau (1961)
- Ancestors (1971)
- So Long, See You Tomorrow (1980) (Note: An aging man remembers a boyhood friendship he had in 1920s Illinois, which falters following a murder.)
- The Outermost Dream (1989)

Omnibus editions

- Early Novels and Stories: Bright Center of Heaven / They Came Like Swallows / The Folded Leaf / Time Will Darken It / Stories 1938–1956 (Library of America, 2008) ISBN 978-1-59853-016-2
- Later Novels and Stories: The Château / So Long, See You Tomorrow / Stories and Improvisations 1957 – 1999 (Library of America, 2008)

=== Short fiction ===
Collections

- Stories (1956), with Jean Stafford, John Cheever and Daniel Fuchs
- The Old Man at the Railroad Crossing and Other Tales (1966)
- Over by the River, and Other Stories (1977)
- Five Tales (1988)
- Billie Dyer and Other Stories (1992)
- All The Days and Nights: The Collected Stories of William Maxwell (1995)

Stories

Title	Publication	Collected in
"Remembrance of Martinique"	Life and Letters To-Day (Winter 1936)	-
"Mrs. Farnham Puts Her Foot Down"	The New Yorker (December 5, 1936)	-
"Christmas Story"	The New Yorker (December 26, 1936)	-
"Valentine for Sidney Kingsley"	The New Yorker (April 10, 1937)	-
"The Four-Leaf Clover"	The New Yorker (October 9, 1937)	-
"Never to Hear Silence"	The New Yorker (December 18, 1937)	-
"Homecoming"	The New Yorker (January 1, 1938)	Early Novels and Stories
"River in Venezuela"	The New Yorker (June 25, 1938)	-
"The Actual Thing"	The New Yorker (September 3, 1938)	Early Novels and Stories
"Young Francis Whitehead" aka "Good Friday"	The New Yorker (April 8, 1939)	Over by the River
"Good Afternoon, Dear Mrs. Whale"	The New Yorker (December 16, 1939)	-
"Retreat to Sharon" (as Jonathan Harrington)	The New Yorker (December 21, 1940)	-
"It's All Settled" (as Jonathan Harrington)	The New Yorker (January 18, 1941)	-
"One Hippopotamus"	Harper's Bazaar (April 1941)	-
"Haller's Second Home" aka "Abbie's Birthday"	Harper's Bazaar (August 1941)	Over by the River
"Electrical Disturbance"	The New Yorker (September 13, 1941)	-
"The Outsider" (as Jonathan Harrington)	The New Yorker (November 22, 1941)	-
"Some People From Home" (as Jonathan Harrington)	The New Yorker (December 13, 1941)	-
"Second of January" (as Jonathan Harrington)	The New Yorker (January 10, 1942)	-
"Cow in Quicksand"	The New Yorker (August 22, 1942)	-
"The American Sense of Humor"	The New Yorker (May 22, 1943)	-
"The Patterns of Love"	The New Yorker (July 7, 1945)	Over by the River
"The Trojan Women"	The Cornhill Magazine (Winter 1947–48)	Stories
"The Status Quo"	The New Yorker (November 26, 1949)	-
"The Absent-Minded Heart"	The New Yorker (February 16, 1952)	-
"The Pilgrimage"	The New Yorker (August 22, 1953)	Over by the River
"What Every Boy Should Know"	Perspectives U.S.A. 7 (Spring 1954)	Stories
"The French Scarecrow"	The New Yorker (September 28, 1956)	Stories
"The old man who was afraid of falling" aka "The Anxious Man"	Pax (September 1957)	The Old Man at the Railroad Crossing
"The shepherd's wife"	The New Yorker (March 15, 1958) ("Two Old Tales About Women (Found in a Rattan Tea Caddy c. 1913)")	The Old Man at the Railroad Crossing
"The epistolarian"	The New Yorker (March 15, 1958) ("Two Old Tales About Women (Found in a Rattan Tea Caddy c. 1913)")	The Old Man at the Railroad Crossing
"The marble watch"	The New Yorker (June 21, 1958) ("Two Old Tales About Men and Women")	The Old Man at the Railroad Crossing
"The half-crazy woman"	The New Yorker (June 21, 1958) ("Two Old Tales About Men and Women")	The Old Man at the Railroad Crossing
"The woman who didn't want anything more"	The New Yorker (August 23, 1958) ("More Old Tales About Women")	The Old Man at the Railroad Crossing
"The woman who never drew breath except to complain"	The New Yorker (August 23, 1958) ("More Old Tales About Women")	The Old Man at the Railroad Crossing
"The blue finch of Arabia"	The New Yorker (October 18, 1958) ("More Old Tales About Men and Women")	The Old Man at the Railroad Crossing
"The girl with a willing heart and a cold mind"	The New Yorker (October 18, 1958) ("More Old Tales About Men and Women")	The Old Man at the Railroad Crossing
"The woodcutter"	The New Yorker (October 18, 1958) ("More Old Tales About Men and Women")	The Old Man at the Railroad Crossing
"About the Children"	The New Yorker (September 30, 1961)	-
"A Final Report"	The New Yorker (March 9, 1963)	Over by the River
"The News of the Week in Review"	The New Yorker (January 4, 1964)	-
"The Value of Money"	The New Yorker (June 6, 1964)	Over by the River
"A Game of Chess"	The New Yorker (June 12, 1965)	All the Days and Nights
"The two women friends"	The New Yorker (August 7, 1965) ("Further Tales About Men and Women")	The Old Man at the Railroad Crossing
"The fisherman who had no one to go out in his boat with him"	The New Yorker (August 7, 1965) ("Further Tales About Men and Women")	The Old Man at the Railroad Crossing
"The man who lost his father"	The New Yorker (August 7, 1965) ("Further Tales About Men and Women")	The Old Man at the Railroad Crossing
"The problem child"	The New Yorker (October 16, 1965) ("Further Tales About Men and Women")	The Old Man at the Railroad Crossing
"The lamplighter"	The New Yorker (October 16, 1965) ("Further Tales About Men and Women")	The Old Man at the Railroad Crossing
"The man who had never been sick a day in his life"	The New Yorker (October 16, 1965) ("Further Tales About Men and Women")	The Old Man at the Railroad Crossing
"The industrious tailor"	The New Yorker (November 13, 1965) ("Further Tales About Men and Women")	The Old Man at the Railroad Crossing
"The poor orphan girl"	The New Yorker (November 13, 1965) ("Further Tales About Men and Women")	The Old Man at the Railroad Crossing
"The carpenter"	The New Yorker (December 11, 1965) ("Further Tales About Men and Women")	The Old Man at the Railroad Crossing
"The sound of waves" aka "The man who took his family to the seashore"	The New Yorker (December 11, 1965) ("Further Tales About Men and Women")	The Old Man at the Railroad Crossing
"The woman who had no eye for small details"	The New Yorker (December 11, 1965) ("Further Tales About Men and Women")	The Old Man at the Railroad Crossing
"The old man at the railroad crossing"	The New Yorker (December 11, 1965) ("Further Tales About Men and Women")	The Old Man at the Railroad Crossing
"The man who had no friends and didn't want any" aka "The man who had no enemies"	The New Yorker (December 25, 1965) ("Further Tales About Men and Women")	The Old Man at the Railroad Crossing
"The woman who lived beside a running stream"	The New Yorker (December 25, 1965) ("Further Tales About Men and Women")	The Old Man at the Railroad Crossing
"The man who loved to eat"	The New Yorker (December 25, 1965) ("Further Tales About Men and Women")	The Old Man at the Railroad Crossing
"The printing office"	The New Yorker (December 25, 1965) ("Further Tales About Men and Women")	The Old Man at the Railroad Crossing
"The country where nobody ever grew old and died"	The Old Man at the Railroad Crossing (1966)	The Old Man at the Railroad Crossing
"The woman with a talent for talking"	The Old Man at the Railroad Crossing (1966)	The Old Man at the Railroad Crossing
"The kingdom where straightforward, logical thinking was admired over every other kind"	The Old Man at the Railroad Crossing (1966)	The Old Man at the Railroad Crossing
"The Gardens of Mont-Saint-Michel"	The New Yorker (August 9, 1969)	Over by the River
"Over by the River"	The New Yorker (July 1, 1974)	Over by the River
"The Thistles in Sweden"	The New Yorker (June 21, 1976)	Over by the River
"So Long, See You Tomorrow"	The New Yorker (October 1 & October 8, 1976)	from So Long, See You Tomorrow
"Love"	The New Yorker (November 14, 1983)	Billie Dyer
"My Father's Friends"	The New Yorker (January 30, 1984)	Billie Dyer
"The Man in the Moon"	The New Yorker (November 12, 1984)	Billie Dyer
"With Reference to an Incident at a Bridge"	Eudora Welty: A Tribute on Her Seventy-Fifth Birthday (1984)	Billie Dyer
"The Holy Terror"	The New Yorker (March 17, 1986)	Billie Dyer
"The Lily-White Boys"	The Paris Review 100 (Summer-Fall 1986)	All the Days and Nights
"A love story"	Five Tales (August 1988)	All the Days and Nights
"The masks"	Five Tales (August 1988)	All the Days and Nights
"All the days and nights"	Five Tales (August 1988)	All the Days and Nights
"Perfection"	Five Tales (August 1988)	Later Novels and Stories
"Billie Dyer"	The New Yorker (May 15, 1989)	Billie Dyer
"A fable begotten of an echo of a line of verse by W. B. Yeats"	Antaeus 64/65 (Spring-Autumn 1990)	All the Days and Nights
"The Front and the Back Parts of the House"	The New Yorker (September 23, 1991)	Billie Dyer
"What He Was Like"	The New Yorker (December 7, 1992)	All the Days and Nights
"The pessimistic fortune-teller" aka "The Fortune-Teller"	Story (Spring 1994) ("Three Tales Written to Please a Lady")	All the Days and Nights
"A mean and spiteful toad" aka "Alice"	Story (Spring 1994) ("Three Tales Written to Please a Lady")	All the Days and Nights
"What you can't hang on to"	Story (Spring 1994) ("Three Tales Written to Please a Lady")	Later Novels and Stories
"Mushrooms"	New England Review (Fall 1994) ("A Brace of Fairy Tales")	Later Novels and Stories
"The dancing"	New England Review (Fall 1994) ("A Brace of Fairy Tales")	Later Novels and Stories
"The Room Outside"	The New Yorker (December 28, 1998 – January 4, 1999)	Later Novels and Stories
"Grape Bay (1941)"	The New Yorker (June 7, 1999)	Later Novels and Stories
"The education of Her Majesty the Queen"	DoubleTake (Fall 1999) ("Two Tales")	Later Novels and Stories
"Newton's law"	DoubleTake (Fall 1999) ("Two Tales")	Later Novels and Stories

=== Non-fiction ===
Essays and reporting

- Maxwell, William (January 15, 1949). "Department of Amplification". The New Yorker. 24 (47): 73–76.
- The Outermost Dream (1989)

Memoirs

- Ancestors: A Family History(1972)

=== Children's books ===
- The Heavenly Tenants (1946) (Note: The constellations of the Zodiac come to life and visit a family farm in Wisconsin.)
- Mrs. Donald's Dog Bun and His Home Away from Home (1995)

== Awards and honors ==
- 1947 Newbery Medal runner-up for The Heavenly Tenants
- 1980 William Dean Howells Medal for So Long, See You Tomorrow,
- 1982 National Book Award for So Long, See You Tomorrow
- 1984 Brandeis Creative Arts Award
- 1995 PEN/Malamud Award
- 1995 Mark Twain Award
