= Robert Shaw Chorale =

Professional choir

- Choir
- Founded: 1948
- Disbanded: 1965
- Chief conductor: Robert Shaw
- Label: RCA Victor

The Robert Shaw Chorale was a renowned professional choir founded in New York City in 1948 by Robert Shaw, a Californian who had been drafted out of college a decade earlier by Fred Waring to conduct his glee club in radio broadcasts.

== History ==
The Chorale enjoyed an intermittent existence, being formed and re-formed on an ad hoc basis for national and international tours and several RCA Victor recordings, its personnel count ranging from around thirty to around sixty voices depending on repertoire requirements. The Chorale ceased operations permanently in 1965, shortly before Shaw assumed the post of Music Director of the Atlanta Symphony Orchestra. During its existence the Robert Shaw Chorale became arguably the best-known and most widely respected professional choral organization in the United States, with repertoire ranging from J.S. Bach to folk music and Broadway theatre tunes. The group's album recording "Christmas Hymns And Carols" released in November 1957 was certified gold in August 1964 by the Recording Industry Association of America (RIAA). This recording peaked at #5 on Billboard's Top Pop Album Chart. The group made several tours sponsored by the U.S. State Department as part of a cultural exchange program, including 21 European and Mid-eastern countries in 1956; South America; and in 1962, a seven-week tour of Russia.

In 1948 the chorale was featured on radio as the summer replacement for the Edgar Bergen-Charlie McCarthy show. Sponsored by Standard Brands for Tenderleaf tea and Royal pudding, the program was broadcast on NBC on Sundays from 8 to 8:30 p.m. Eastern Time.

The Robert Shaw Chorale was notable for its homogeneity of tone, finely wrought balances between vocal sections, elegance of phrasing, and rhythmic vitality. Many of its members were recruited from Juilliard and other NYC-area conservatories, sometimes to the consternation of those singers’ voice teachers: Shaw was fond in later years of relating that when he was preparing to take the Chorale on a grueling U.S. tour of 36 one-night stands performing Bach’s lengthy Mass in B Minor, several teachers protested that he would ruin their students’ voices. At the end of the tour, when teachers remarked with astonishment that the voices had actually improved, Shaw replied to the effect that “Bach has been teaching singing.” Alumni of the Chorale include a number of singers who had significant careers as solo artists, including sopranos Yvonne Ciannella and Shirlee Emmons, alto Florence Kopleff, tenors Seth McCoy and Jon Humphrey, and baritone Thomas Pyle; and several others who have worked with distinction as directors of their own choruses, such as Clayton Krehbiel, Donald Craig, and Maurice Casey.

The Robert Shaw Chorale ceased operations with Robert Shaw's move to Atlanta. Subsequent groups with which Shaw gave concerts and made recordings, apart from the Atlanta Symphony Orchestra and Chorus, were the Robert Shaw Festival Singers, a group which operated mainly around Shaw's summer home in France after his retirement as the Atlanta Symphony Orchestra's Music Director; and the Robert Shaw Chamber Singers, an Atlanta-based group composed chiefly of members of the Atlanta Symphony Chamber Chorus.

== Selected recordings ==
- Hymns of Thanksgiving, RCA Victor, 1951
- Great Sacred Choruses, RCA Victor, 1951
- Music Of The 16th Century, RCA Victor, 1952
- Mascagni: Cavalleria Rusticana, RCA Victor, 1953
- Leoncavallo: Pagliacci, RCA Victor, 1953
- My True Love Sings, RCA Victor, 1956
- Deep River And Other Spirituals, RCA Victor, 1958
- What Wondrous Love, RCA Victor, 1960
- Sea Shanties, RCA Victor, 1961
- Bach: Mass in B minor, RCA Victor, Grammy winner, 1962
- This Is My Country RCA Victor, 1963
- The Many Moods of Christmas, RCA Victor, 1963
- I'm Going to Sing: 16 Spirituals, RCA Victor, 1964
- Songs Of Faith And Inspiration, RCA Victor, 1964
- Handel: Messiah, RCA Victor, Grammy winner, recorded 1966
- Sing to the Lord: Early American Folk Hymns, RCA Victor, 1967
- Irish Folk Songs, RCA Victor, 1968
