= Symphony on a French Mountain Air =

Composition for piano and orchestra by Vincent d'Indy

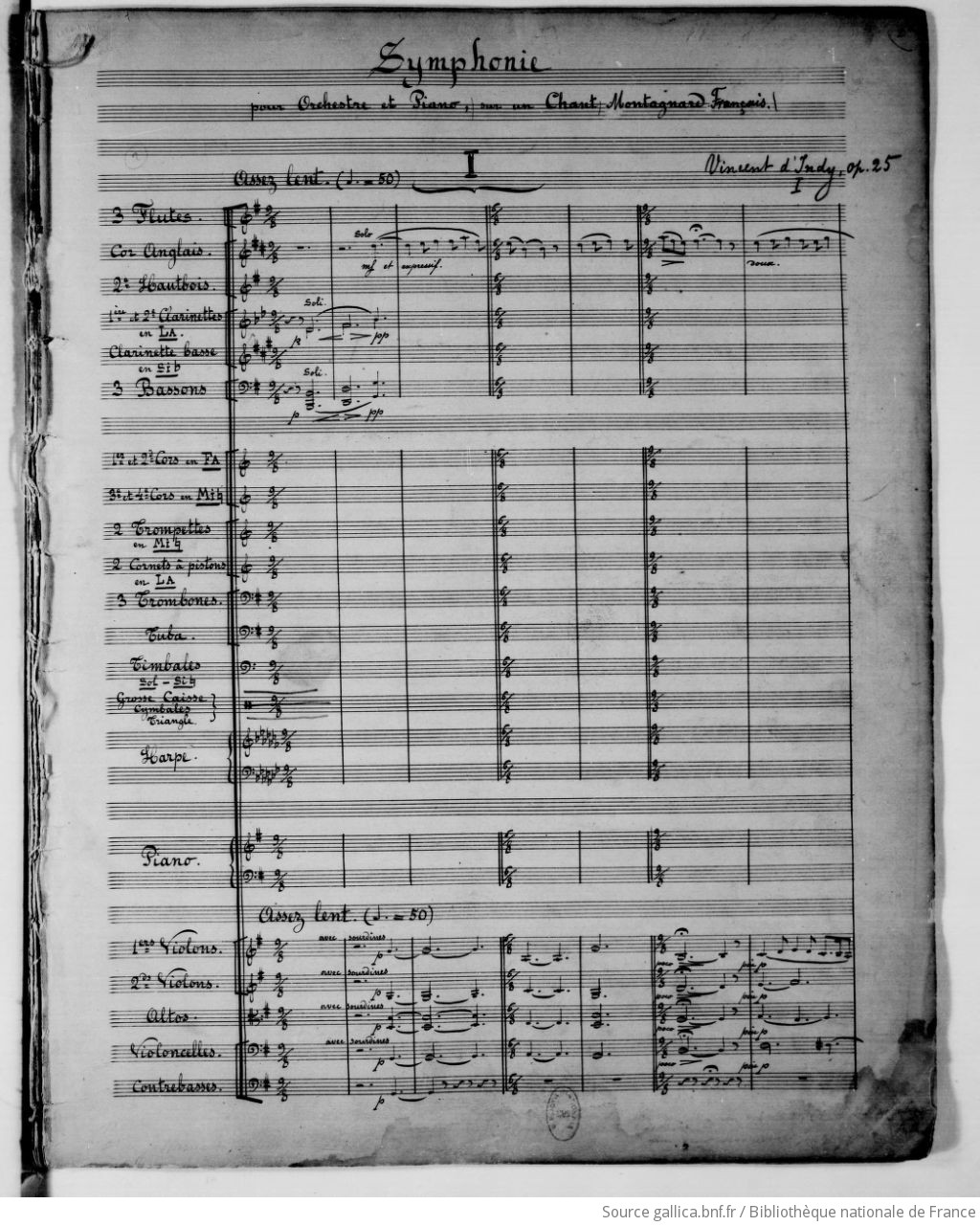
Autographed first page of the score.

The Symphony on a French Mountain Air (French: Symphonie sur un chant montagnard français), Op. 25, is an orchestral composition written in 1886 by Vincent d'Indy. As indicated by the title, d'Indy took the principal theme from a folk song he heard at Périer overlooking the Cévennes mountains (hence the work's alternative name, Symphonie cévenole).

Originally conceived as a fantaisie for piano and orchestra, the symphony is unusual in that it is scored for a prominent (but never dominant) piano part together with orchestra, and has acquired the label sinfonia concertante from some critics.

It consists of three movements and lasts just under half an hour:

1. Assez lent – Modérément animé
2. Assez modéré, mais sans lenteur
3. Animé

The symphony begins with an evocative melody played first by a cor anglais. The main themes of subsequent movements are based on this melody, and as the symphony progresses each subsequent variation becomes more and more like the original version.

The work was dedicated to Marie-Léontine Bordes-Pène, who was the soloist at the premiere in Paris on March 20, 1887.

== Discography ==
- 1950 – Prague Radio Symphony Orchestra, conducted by Karel Šejna with Hélène Boschi, piano
- 1953 - Orchestre de la Société des Concerts du Conservatoire, conducted by André Cluytens with Aldo Ciccolini, piano
- 1958 - Philadelphia Orchestra, conducted by Eugene Ormandy with Robert Casadesus, piano
- 1959 – Boston Symphony Orchestra, conducted by Charles Munch with Nicole Henriot-Schweitzer, piano
- 1976 – Orchestre de Paris, conducted by Serge Baudo with Aldo Ciccolini, piano
- 1977 – Budapest Philharmonic Orchestra, conducted by Tamás Pál with Gabriella Torma, piano
- 1991 - Orchestre Symphonique de Montréal, conducted by Charles Dutoit with Jean-Yves Thibaudet, piano
- 1992 – Orchestre Philharmonique de Radio France, conducted by Marek Janowski with Catherine Collard, piano
