= Harold Powers =

American musicologist and music theorist

Harold Stone Powers (August 5, 1928 – March 15, 2007) was an American musicologist, ethnomusicologist, and music theorist.

== Career ==
Born in New York City on August 5, 1928, he earned his B.Mus. in piano from Syracuse University in 1950 and an MFA in composition and musicology from Princeton University in 1952. As a Fulbright Fellow, he studied Indian music in Madras for two years before continuing at Princeton where he received a Ph.D. in musicology. His dissertation was on “The Background of the South Indian Raga System.” Powers taught at Harvard University from 1958 to 1960 and at the University of Pennsylvania from 1961 to 1973 before returning to Princeton where he was named the Scheide Professor of Music History in 1995 and in 2001 assumed Emeritus status. Powers returned to India several times to study music there on John D. Rockefeller III and Fulbright Senior fellowships.

Powers was known for intensive study of both Renaissance music and music theory and several world music traditions (especially Indian music); this allowed him to reevaluate the concept of mode. He did this in a number of articles, including “Mode” in the New Grove Dictionary of Music and Musicians (1980), a landmark of scholarship on the subject, "Tonal types and modal categories in Renaissance polyphony" (1981), "Modal representations in polyphonic offertories" [based mostly on Palestrina's Offertoria cycle] (1982), "Is mode real?" (1992), "Anomalous modalities" (1996), “Language Models and Musical Analysis,” and “Puccini’s Turandot: The End of the Great Tradition,”

Powers was the first foreigner to perform at the Tyagaraja Aradhana in Thiruvaiyaru, India.

The Harold Powers World Travel Fund, administered by the American Musicological Society, was established in 2006 to “encourage and assist Ph.D. candidates, post-docs, and junior faculty in all fields of musical scholarship to travel anywhere in the world to carry out the necessary work for their dissertation or other research. The Fund honors the polymathic scholar and distinguished longtime AMS member whose publications have ranged from music and language to medieval mode to Indian music to Puccini and whose interests are wider still, but always with the communicative aspects of music at their base.”

== Books ==
- The Background of the South Indian Rāga-System (dissertation, Princeton U., 1959)
- (ed.) Studies in Music History: Essays for Oliver Strunk (Princeton, NJ, 1968)
- William Ashbrook and Harold Powers, "Puccini's Turandot: The End of the Great Tradition" (Princeton, NJ, 1991)
