= Edgar Warren Williams =

American composer and conductor

Edgar Warren Williams (born June 12, 1949) is an American composer, conductor, and music theorist.

Williams obtained a bachelor's degree in composition from Duke University in 1971, then obtained a master's degree at Columbia University in 1973, studying with Charles Wuorinen, Mario Davidovsky, and Harvey Sollberger. He then matriculated at Princeton, where he received a Master's in Fine Arts in 1977 and a Ph.D. in 1982 and studied with Milton Babbitt and James K. Randall. He was a faculty member and orchestral conductor at the College of William & Mary from 1979. Williams's compositional work is noted for its orchestrational and timbral complexity, and its use of pitch collections as melodic and thematic elements.

== Compositions ==
=== Orchestral ===
- 1969 Of Orphalese
- 1984 Landscapes with figure
- 1998 Nosferatu: A Symphony of Horror
- 1999 Suite on "Nosferatu"

=== For concert band ===
- 1968 "To my Father" Prologue
- 1978 Across a Bridge of Dreams
- 1991 Into the dark
- 1993 Now showing!
- 2002 Music from behind the Moon
- Prologue

==== Musicals ====
- 1970 Music for In the Dark of the Moon
- 1982 Music for The Merry Wives of Windsor – text by William Shakespeare
- 1985 Music for Richard II – text by William Shakespeare

=== Choral ===
- 1975 The mystic trumpeter, for mixed choir and orchestra
- 1976 Multum in parvo, for large mixed choir
- 1998 Star Spangled Banner, canon for choir
- Missa, For six-member men's choir, brass and piano

=== Vocal music ===
- 1985 Three songs, for high voice and piano – text: Margaret Tongue
- 1985 The bawds of euphony, for high voice and piano – text: Wallace Stevens
- Two Lyrics, for middle voice and piano – text: James Agee

=== Chamber music ===
- 1968 Chamber Piece Nr. 1
- 1968 Chamber Piece Nr. 2
- 1971 String Quartet Nr. 1
- 1980 Amoretti, for viola and piano
- 1985 Caprice, for violin
- 1996 String Quartet Nr. 2
- 1999 String Trio
- Fant'sy I (from "Hortus conclusus"), for 9 instruments
- Fant'sy II (from "Hortus conclusus"), for 12 instruments
- Fant'sy III (from "Hortus conclusus"), for 12 instruments

=== Piano ===
- 1987 Six Studies
- 2005 Sonata

=== Guitar ===
- 2002 Guitar quartet

=== Electronic music ===
- 2000 Pentimenti

== Publications ==
- Edgar Warren Williams: Harmony and Voice Leading, New York: HarperCollins, 1992.
- Edgar Warren Williams: Introduction to Music, New York: HarperCollins, 1991. (Co-authored with Miller and Taylor.)
- Edgar Warren Williams: "Banqueting with the Emperor", in: Perspectives of New Music, vol. 35, no. 1 (1998)
- Edgar Warren Williams: "A View of Schoenberg's Opus 19, No. 2", in: College Music Symposium, vol. 25 (1985)
- Edgar Warren Williams: "In and About Some Measures of Beethoven", in: 19th-Century Music, November 1983
- Edgar Warren Williams: "On Complementary Interval Class Sets", in: In Theory Only, vol. 7 (June 1983)
