= Brookie Maxwell =

American artist and curator

- Born: October 15, 1956; New York, New York
- Died: November 4, 2015 (aged 59)

Emily Brooke "Brookie" Maxwell (October 15, 1956 – November 4, 2015) was an American artist and curator.

== Early life ==
Maxwell was born in Manhattan, New York, to parents William Maxwell, a literary editor for The New Yorker magazine, and Emily Noyes, a poet. Maxwell received a degree in Fine Arts from the School of Visual Arts in 1977.

== Career ==
In 1986, Maxwell founded the Creative Arts Workshops to serve children living in New York's homeless shelters and welfare-subsidized hotels. The best-known project of the Workshops was "Calle de Suenos", or "Street of Dreams" in English, a 5000-square-foot mural on Lexington avenue near 124th street, New York.

In 1999, Maxwell founded Gallery 138 in Soho, New York City, to represent emerging artists.

Her work is included in the art collections of the US Department of State and the Brooklyn Museum.

She died of ovarian cancer in 2015.
