= So Long, See You Tomorrow (novel) =

1979 novel by William Maxwell

- First edition (Note: The first edition cover was designed by William Maxwell's daughter and inspired by Giacometti's sculpture Palace at 4 a.m, which is discussed in the novel. Source: "William Maxwell" at The Bounty)
- Author: William Maxwell
- Cover artist: Brookie Maxwell
- Language: English
- Publisher: The New Yorker (magazine); Knopf (book)
- Publication date: 1979 (magazine); 1980 (book)
- Publication place: United States
- Media type: Print
- Pages: 135
- ISBN: 0-394-50835-1

So Long, See You Tomorrow is a novel by American author William Maxwell. It was first published in The New Yorker magazine in October 1979 in two parts. It was published as a book the following year by Alfred A. Knopf.

It was awarded the William Dean Howells Medal, and its first paperback edition won a 1982 National Book Award. (Note: So Long won the 1982 award for paperback fiction. (From 1980 to 1983 in National Book Awards history, there were dual hardcover and paperback awards in most categories. Most of the paperback award-winners were reprints, including this one.)) It was a finalist for the 1981 Pulitzer Prize. Michael Ondaatje described it as "one of the great books of our age". In 2016, it was included in a Parade Magazine list of the "75 Best Books of the Past 75 Years".

The novel is based on fact and has been described as an "autobiographical metafiction".

== Plot introduction ==
So Long, See You Tomorrow is set in Maxwell's hometown of Lincoln, Illinois and tells of a murder that occurred in 1922. Fifty years later the guilt-ridden narrator recounts how the relationships between two neighboring families — the Smiths and the Wilsons — led to the murder of Lloyd Wilson and the suicide of Clarence Smith. Also the narrator recounts how he failed to support Cletus, a close school friend who was the son of the murderer, Clarence Smith.

== Critical reception and influence ==
On November 5, 2019, the BBC News listed So Long, See You Tomorrow on its list of the 100 most influential novels. In a starred review, Kirkus Reviews stated that the book was "major accomplishment: a wellnigh faultless, lacerating, and heartbreaking short novel." The book review site The Pequod rated the book a 10.0 (out of 10), saying, "Maxwell's story is personal but yet universal, and it leads us to recall our own childhood moments of regret and loss. This is a wondrous novel from start to finish."

So Long, See You Tomorrow influenced American writer Justin Torres and was directly referenced in his book Blackouts.
