= Nicole Henriot-Schweitzer =

French pianist (1925–2001)

Nicole Henriot-Schweitzer (25 November 1925 – 2 February 2001) was a French classical pianist.

== Biography ==
Henriot-Schweitzer was born in Paris. Her father was Émile Henriot and her mother Françoise Riché. The conductors Fritz Münch and Charles Munch were her uncles by marriage.

She studied music at the Conservatoire de Paris in Marguerite Long's class. She won her first prize for piano in 1938, at the age of 13. In 1939, she won third prize in the Gabriel Fauré competition at Luxembourg city (after Georges Farago and Ginette Doyen,) and began her career after the Second World War. In the biography of Charles Munch written by D. Kern Holoman is told that she was tortured by the Gestapo. Her left hand was broken.

In 1958 she married Vice-Admiral Jean-Jacques Schweitzer (1920–1993). This former navy major general was also one of theologian Albert Schweitzer's nephews and the uncle of senior official Louis Schweitzer; by his mother, Emma Münch, he was the nephew of conductor Charles Munch. The following year, she had a son named Jean-Philippe Schweitzer.

From 1970 she became professor of piano at the conservatories of Liege then Brussel and in 1975 and 1976 she was a jury member at the Paloma O'Shea Santander International Piano Competition.

She died in Louveciennes and lies in the cemetery (ancient part), in the same tomb as Charles Munch.

== Career ==
She toured extensively outside France.

The Boston Symphony Orchestra, directed by her uncle Charles Munch, very often chose her as interpreter. She became soloist with the Orchestre de Paris when the same Charles Munch formed the orchestra in 1967.

Henriot-Schweitzer's most famous creation was Darius Milhaud's Suite concertante in 1953.
