= Perspectives U.S.A. =

United States magazine

Perspectives U.S.A. was a magazine of art and culture of the United States, that was published in New York City from 1952 to 1956, as part of the so-called "Cultural Cold War against the Soviet Union."

== History and profile ==
The first issue appeared in October 1952. It was edited by James Laughlin and published by the non-profit organization Intercultural Publications, with funds from the Ford Foundation. It had several editions in different languages, including English, French, German, and Italian. The magazine, published on a quarterly basis, ceased publication after the foundation concluded that it had little impact in Europe. The final issue was the sixteenth one, which appeared in July 1956.
