= Florence Kopleff =

American opera singer (1924–2012)

Florence Kopleff (May 2, 1924 – July 24, 2012) was an American contralto.

She was born in New York City, and died in Atlanta, GA of complications of diabetes.

She grew up in the Bronx, NY, the daughter of Charles and Rebecca Kopleff. She had one brother, Abraham.

She began her career in 1941 when she was in her senior year of high school. In 1954 the New York Times termed her performance at New York's Town Hall "a debut recital of considerable distinction," and further stated that "Her voice is a large, powerful instrument with a wonderful ringing sonority, evenly produced over a wide range." She was very active as a concert and oratorio singer, appearing and recording with many of the great conductors of her era, particularly as a soloist with the Robert Shaw Chorale. She was also a frequent soloist with the Atlanta Symphony Orchestra, of which Robert Shaw was the conductor. Time magazine once called her the "greatest living alto."

She taught at Georgia State University starting in 1968, when she became a professor and the school's first artist-in-residence. The GSU School of Music's recital hall is named for her.

== Sources ==
This article is based on interviews with Florence Kopleff.

== Recordings ==
- Bach: Mass in B minor with Robert Shaw, RCA Victor, Grammy winner, 1961
- Beethoven: 9th Symphony with Fritz Reiner, RCA Victor
- Berlioz: L'Enfance du Christ, with Charles Münch, RCA Victor (now available in a multi-album reissue set Munch Conducts Berlioz) A 1966 video of a live performance, also conducted by Munch, has been issued as Video Artists Int'l DVD, Catalog #4303.
- Mahler: Symphony No. 2 with Maurice Abravanel, Vanguard
- Handel: Messiah with Robert Shaw, RCA Victor, Grammy winner, 1967
- [Handel] Israel in Egypt (oratorio), with Musica Aeterna, cond. Frederic Waldman
