= Nina Bawden =

English novelist and children's writer (1925–2012)

Nina Bawden CBE, FRSL, JP
- Bawden in 2003
- Born: 19 January 1925; Ilford, Essex, England
- Died: 22 August 2012 (aged 87); Islington, London, England
- Occupation: Writer
- Spouses: Harry Bawden (m. 1946; div. 1954) Austen Kark (m. 1954; died 2002)
- Children: 3
- Writing career
- Period: 1953–2004
- Genres: Novels, children's literature

Nina Mary Bawden CBE, FRSL, JP (19 January 1925 – 22 August 2012) was an English novelist and children's writer.

According to the BBC, Bawden was "one of the few modern novelists to write successfully for both adults and children", while P. D. James described her as "among the most perceptive and accomplished novelists writing today".

A recipient of the Golden PEN Award, she was shortlisted for the Booker Prize in 1987 and the Lost Man Booker Prize in 2010.

== Biography ==
Nina Bawden was born in 1925 in Ilford, Essex, England as Nina Mary Mabey. She lived in Ilford in "a rather nasty housing estate that [her] mother despised". Her mother was a teacher and her father a member of the Royal Marines. She was evacuated during the Second World War to Aberdare, Wales, at the age of fourteen. She spent school holidays at a farm in Shropshire with her mother and brothers.

She was educated at Ilford County High School for Girls, and then attended Somerville College, Oxford (BA 1946, MA 1951), where she gained a degree in Philosophy, Politics and Economics.

From 1946 to 1954 she was married to Harry Bawden. They had two sons, Nicholas (who took his own life in 1981) and Robert. In 1954 Nina married Austen Kark, a reporter who eventually became managing director of the BBC World Service. They had a daughter, Perdita, who died in March 2012. She also had two stepdaughters: Cathy, who lives in New Zealand, and Teresa, who lives in London.

In 2002 Bawden was badly injured in the Potters Bar rail crash, in which her husband was killed. Her testimony about the crash, and her exploration of the management and maintenance mistakes that caused it, became a major part of David Hare's play The Permanent Way, in which she appeared as a character.

Bawden died at her home in Islington, London, on 22 August 2012.

== Literary career ==
Some of Bawden's 55 books have been dramatised by BBC children's television. Many have been published in translation.

Her novels include On the Run (1964), The Witch's Daughter (1966), The Birds on the Trees (1970), Carrie's War (1973), and The Peppermint Pig (1975). For the latter she won the 1976 Guardian Children's Fiction Prize, a once-in-a-lifetime book award judged by a panel of British children's writers. Carrie's War won the 1993 Phoenix Award from the Children's Literature Association as the best English-language children's book that did not win a major contemporary award when it was originally published twenty years earlier. It is named for the mythical bird phoenix, which is reborn from its ashes, to suggest the book's rise from obscurity. (Bawden and Carrie's War had been a commended runner up for the Carnegie Medal from the Library Association, recognising the year's best children's book by a British subject.) (Note: Today there are usually eight books on the Carnegie shortlist. According to CCSU, there were about 160 commendations of two kinds in 49 years from 1954 to 2002, including Bawden and two others for 1977.)

In 2010, Bawden made the shortlist for the Lost Man Booker Prize with her novel The Birds on the Trees. Forty years earlier, the Booker-McConnell Prize for the year's best British novel had skipped 1970 publications. Bawden and Shirley Hazzard were the only living nominees out of the six shortlisted; the award went to J. G. Farrell for Troubles. In 2004, she was awarded the Golden PEN Award by English PEN for "a Lifetime's Distinguished Service to Literature".

Runner up for other awards

- 1987 Shortlisted for the Booker Prize – Circles of Deceit
- 1995 Shortlisted for the WH Smith Mind-Boggling Book Award – The Real Plato Jones
- 1996 Shortlisted for the Carnegie Medal – Granny the Pag

== Works ==
- Who Calls the Tune? (1953)
- The Odd Flamingo (1954)
- Change Here for Babylon (1955)
- The Solitary Child (1956)
- Devil by the Sea (1957)
- Just Like a Lady (1960)
- In Honour Bound (1961)
- The Secret Passage (1963)
- Tortoise by Candlelight (1963)
- The House of Secrets (1963)
- On the Run (1964); US title, Three on the Run
- Under the Skin (1964)
- A Little Love, A Little Learning (1965)
- The White Horse Gang (1966)
- The Witch's Daughter (1966)
- A Handful of Thieves (1967)
- A Woman of My Age (1967)
- The Grain of Truth (1969)
- The Runaway Summer (1969)
- The Birds on the Trees (1970)
- Squib (1971)
- Anna Apparent (1972)
- Carrie's War (1973) — winner of the 1993 Phoenix Award
- George Beneath a Paper Moon (1974)
- The Peppermint Pig (1975) — winner of the 1976 Guardian Prize
- Afternoon of a Good Woman (1976)
- Rebel on a Rock (1978)
- Familiar Passions (1979)
- The Robbers (1979)
- Walking Naked (1981)
- William Tell (1981), a picture book
- Kept in the Dark (1982)
- The Ice House (1983)
- Saint Francis of Assisi (1983), a picture book
- The Finding (1985)
- On the Edge (1985)
- Princess Alice (1986)
- Circles of Deceit (1987)
- Keeping Henry (1988)
- The Outside Child (1989)
- Family Money (1991)
- Humbug (1992)
- The Real Plato Jones (1993)
- In My Own Time: Almost an Autobiography (1994)
- Granny the Pag (1995)
- A Nice Change (1997)
- Off the Road (1998)
- The Ruffian on the Stair (2001)
- Dear Austen (2005)

== See also ==
- List of winners and shortlisted authors of the Booker Prize for Fiction
