= Matthew Specktor =

American novelist and screenwriter (born 1966)

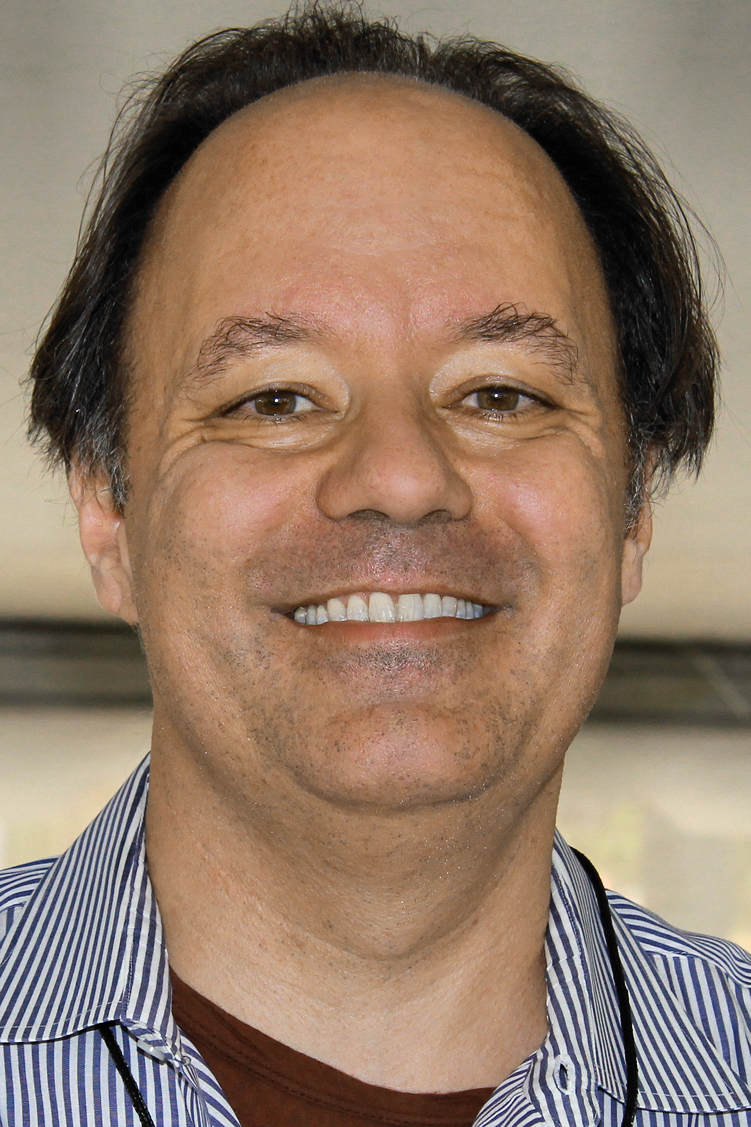
- Matthew Specktor at the 2013 Texas Book Festival.
- Education: Hampshire College; Warren Wilson College.
- Writing career
- Genres: novels; screenplays

Matthew Specktor (born 1966) is an American novelist and screenwriter.

== Early life ==
Specktor was born in Los Angeles. His father, Fred Specktor, is a talent agent at Creative Artists Agency. His mother, Katherine McGaffey Howe, was a screenwriter who died in 2008. He received his BA from Hampshire College in 1988, and his MFA in creative writing from Warren Wilson College in 2009.

In the 1990s, Specktor worked in film development, including jobs at TriBeCa Productions, Jersey Films, and Fox 2000 Pictures. In 2001, he adapted Shirley Hazzard's novel The Transit of Venus in partnership with Radical Media.

== Career ==
Specktor's first novel,That Summertime Sound, was published in 2009. A nonfiction book of film criticism, about the motion picture The Sting, was published in 2011. Specktor's second novel, American Dream Machine, was published in 2013. The book was a New York Times Editor's Choice, and was optioned by Showtime Networks.

In 2021, Specktor published Always Crashing in the Same Car: On Art, Crisis, and Los Angeles, California, which alternates between the story of Specktor's own life (including his divorce and the death of his mother) and the lives of the artists Eleanor Perry, Carole Eastman, Thomas McGuane, Tuesday Weld, Warren Zevon, Renata Adler, Hal Ashby, and Michael Cimino. Specktor told the Orange County Register that he had been struggling with writing a TV pilot, and “realized that the idea of writing a book that was both a memoir and an investigation of the artists who had experienced silences or crises in their careers was attractive to me.” Publishers Weekly called the book "fascinating" and "illuminating," and concluded that "this enthralling work deserves a central spot on the ever-growing shelf of books about Tinseltown."

Specktor's short fiction, essays and reviews have appeared in The New York Times, GQ, and The Paris Review, among other publications. He is a former senior fiction editor at the Los Angeles Review of Books.

In 2021 he married producer Samantha Culp, whose father was actor Robert Culp.
