= The Singapore Grip (TV series) =

British television series

- Genre: Drama
- Written by: Christopher Hampton
- Directed by: Tom Vaughan
- Starring: Charles Dance; Luke Treadaway; Colm Meaney; David Morrissey; Elizabeth Tan; Jane Horrocks; Georgia Blizzard
- Country of origin: United Kingdom
- Original language: English
- No. of series: 1
- No. of episodes: 6

Production
- Executive producer: Damien Timmer
- Producer: Farah Abushwesha
- Running time: 55 minutes
- Production company: Mammoth Screen

Original release
- Network: ITV
- Release: 13 September – 18 October 2020

The Singapore Grip is an ITV six-part television drama series. It is an adaptation of Booker Prize winner J.G. Farrell's 1978 novel The Singapore Grip. The story tells of a love affair taking place around the time of the Japanese invasion of Singapore. It stars Luke Treadaway, David Morrissey and Elizabeth Tan.

The series debut was on BBC First in Australia on 26 July 2020, followed by 13 September on UK's ITV.

== Synopsis ==
The story focuses on a British family, the Blacketts, who control one of the leading trading companies in colonial-era Singapore, and on Matthew Webb, the son of Walter Blackett's business partner. Walter is keen that Matthew should marry his daughter Joan, but Matthew is interested instead in a mysterious Chinese woman, Vera Chiang. When the Japanese invade and occupy Singapore, the couple is forced apart. A running joke in the story is Matthew trying to find out what "the Singapore Grip" means, and getting different answers from different people he talks to.

== Cast ==
- Charles Dance as Mr. Webb
- Luke Treadaway as Matthew Webb
- David Morrissey as Walter Blackett
- Georgia Blizzard as Joan Blackett
- Jane Horrocks as Sylvia Blackett
- Lilo Baier as Kate Blackett
- Luke Newberry as Monty Blackett
- Colm Meaney as Major Brendan Archer
- Elizabeth Tan as Vera Chiang
- Bart Edwards as Ehrendorf
- Christophe Guybet as Dupigny

== Production ==
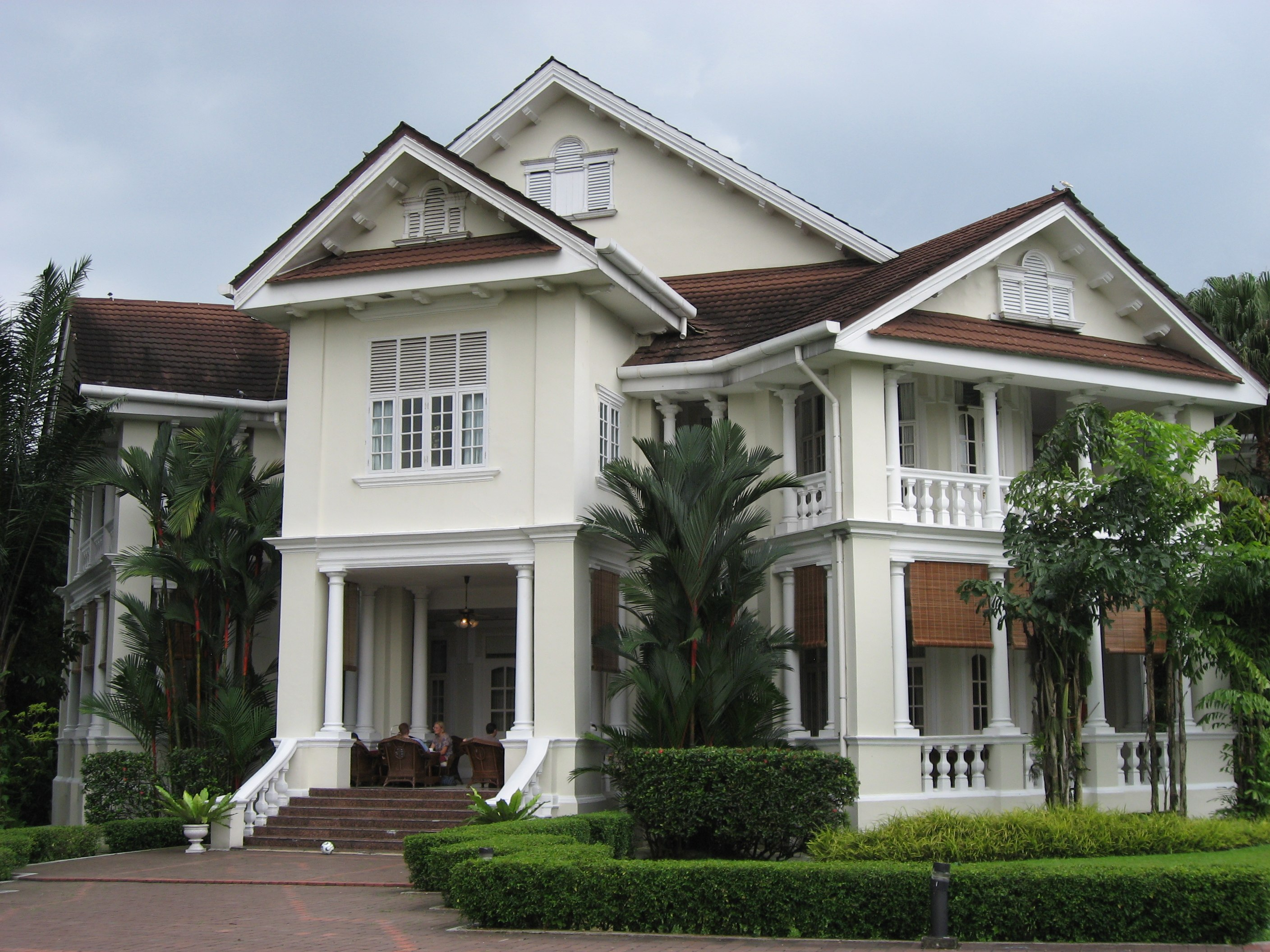
Carcosa Seri Negara, a film location

ITV commissioned the production of an adaptation of the J. G. Farrell book, The Singapore Grip, in February 2018. The production company Mammoth Screen approached Christopher Hampton to write the screenplay. Hampton, who knew Farrell very well before he died in 1979, readily agreed. The series was executive produced by Damien Timmer, and filming began in early 2019.

The series was filmed in various locations in and around Kuala Lumpur and Penang in Malaysia rather than in Singapore which has become too well-developed to reflect the look and feel of the colonial era. The mansions of Carcosa Seri Negara in Perdana Botanical Gardens in Kuala Lumpur served as the residences of the Blacketts and Mr Webb. A vintage plane from a museum in a military airbase was used for the arrival of Matthew Webb, and an abandoned town near Kuala Lumpur airport was used for the firefighting scene. The Battle of Slim River was also filmed near Kuala Lumpur, as was the plantation scene filmed at Broga Plantation. Other locations that doubled for old Singapore included the Royal Selangor Club and Wisma Ekran (Anglo-Oriental Building) in Kuala Lumpur, Church of Our Lady of Lourdes in Klang, as well as Georgetown's Chinatown, City Hall, cricket ground and Esplanade, Swettenham Pier, the Lebuh Aceh Mosque Compound, the Thai Pak Koong Temple, and Balik Pulau Rice Field in Penang.

== Episodes ==
STV Player uploaded all six episodes at once as a boxset on 13 September 2020, whereas the ITV Hub uploaded each episode individually after broadcast every Sunday, from 13 September-18 October 2020.

No. overall	No. in series	Title	Directed by	Written by	Original release date	Viewers (millions)
1	1	"Singapore for Beginners"	Tom Vaughan	Christopher Hampton	13 September 2020	3.52
For Walter Blackett and his family, 1941 Singapore provides a world of wealth and privilege. However, when the family's position is undermined, Walter is forced to think on his feet.
2	2	"The Great World"	Tom Vaughan	Christopher Hampton	20 September 2020	2.76
Matthew is adjusting to life in Singapore, but finds himself troubled by dubious practices in his father's business. Following an evening of entertainment with the Blacketts, he finds himself torn between two women.
3	3	"Engagement"	Tom Vaughan	Christopher Hampton	27 September 2020	2.65
Singapore's residents are given a stark awakening to the realities of war when tragedy strikes the city. Walter confides in Joan, but is forced to make a confession. Dupigny has a narrow escape in George Town. Matthew has a decision to make.
4	4	"The Singapore Grip"	Tom Vaughan	Christopher Hampton	4 October 2020	2.60
Ehrendorf arrives at Slim River as an officer under British secondment where he has news for Sylvia's brother, Charlie, and the underprepared defenders. Walter and his rival Solomon come to an agreement. Matthew declares his intentions to Vera.
5	5	"The Human Condition"	Tom Vaughan	Christopher Hampton	11 October 2020	2.52
When tragedy strikes, Walter spots an opportunity to turn the situation to his advantage. As bombs rain down on Singapore, Ehrendorf treads on new ground. After Matthew resolves to help Vera escape, the duo face a race against time.
6	6	"Survival Instinct"	Tom Vaughan	Christopher Hampton	18 October 2020	N/A
Walter, still reeling from recent news, struggles to face the harsh truth. Matthew hears devastating news about Vera and races to save her from danger. Unprepared for the challenge to their way out of Singapore, tragedy strikes for all involved.

== Critical reception ==
The Guardian gave it two stars, and called the satire "bite-free", saying the humour was "oddly pitched" and "cast between two poles, neither vicious nor silly enough to make sense of telling yet another colonial story from an almost entirely white perspective". The Independent also gave the series two stars, criticizing the tone and stating, "It can't decide how sharp to be, veering between a Catch-22-style black comedy about the horrors of war and a jolly-old-marriage farce, complete with a relentless big band soundtrack." Anita Singh of The Daily Telegraph rated it better at three stars, but still considered it lacking the bite of the book. She thought the drama appeared rather "more akin to a cosy Jeeves and Wooster-style comedy"; the "cosiness is deliberate – the invasion will come as a rude awakening – but what worked on the page does not transfer easily to the screen. It ends up looking like any other jolly ITV drama."

James Delingpole of The Spectator was more positive, describing the cast as "splendid, the colonial setting lavishly realised... This is the Sunday night TV many of us feared they'd never dare make any more."

=== Controversy ===
The advocacy group British East and South East Asians working in the Theatre and Screen industries criticised the series as "colonial history told through a white gaze", whose "Asian characters are merely heavily accented ciphers, silent chauffeurs, exotic dancers, giggly prostitutes, monosyllabic grunts and half-naked Yogis". Screenwriter Christopher Hampton defended the books on which the series is based as "perhaps the most celebrated attack on colonialism by a British novelist in the 20th century".
