= The Great Fire (Hazzard novel) =

2003 novel by Shirley Hazzard

- First edition
- Author: Shirley Hazzard
- Language: English
- Publisher: Farrar Straus and Giroux (USA); Virago Press (UK)
- Publication date: 2003
- Publication place: Australia
- Media type: Print (paperback)
- Pages: 278 pp
- ISBN: 0-374-16644-7
- OCLC: 52341650
- Dewey Decimal: 823/.914 21
- LC Class: PR9619.3.H369 G74 2003
- Preceded by: The Transit of Venus

The Great Fire (2003) is a novel by the Australian author Shirley Hazzard. It won the U.S. National Book Award for Fiction and a Miles Franklin literary award (2004). The novel was Hazzard's first since The Transit of Venus, published in 1980.

== Overview ==
The novel commences in Japan in 1947, and subsequently takes in Hong Kong, England and New Zealand. Written in the third-person narrative, the novel principally follows its protagonist, the decorated British war veteran Aldred Leith, who is travelling through post-war Asia to write a book. At times the narrator follows Peter Exley, an Australian friend of Leith's who is investigating Japanese war crimes, and Helen Driscoll, an Australian teenager with whom Leith falls in love while billeted in Japan.

The New Yorker wrote of the novel:

Hazzard is nothing if not discriminating. Hierarchies of feeling, perception, and taste abound in her writing, and this novel—her first in more than twenty years—takes on the very notion of what it means to be civilized. The fire of the title refers primarily to the atomic bombing of Japan, but also to the possibility of transcendent passion in its aftermath. In 1947, a thirty-two-year-old English war hero visiting Hiroshima during the occupation finds himself billeted in a compound overseen by a boorish Australian brigadier and his scheming wife. He is immediately enchanted, however, by the couple's children—a brilliant, sickly young man and his adoring sister—who prove to be prisoners in a different sort of conflict. In the ensuing love story, Hazzard's moral refinement occasionally veers toward preciosity, but such lapses are counterbalanced by her bracing conviction that we either build or destroy the world we want to live in with our every word and gesture.

== Awards ==
- National Book Award (USA), Fiction, 2003
- Miles Franklin Literary Award, 2004
- William Dean Howells Medal, 2005

Runners up

- Kiriyama Pacific Rim Book Prize, Fiction, 2004: finalist
- Booker Prize, 2004: longlisted
- Orange Prize for Fiction (UK), 2004: shortlisted
- International Dublin Literary Award, 2005: shortlisted
