= Lost Man Booker Prize =

- Awarded for: Best full-length English novel from 1970
- Location: Commonwealth of Nations, Ireland, or Zimbabwe
- Presented by: Man Group
- First award: 2010
- Website: themanbookerprize.com

The Lost Man Booker Prize was a special edition of the Man Booker Prize awarded by a public vote in 2010 to a novel from 1970 as the books published in 1970 were not eligible for the Man Booker Prize due to a rules alteration; until 1970 the prize was awarded to books published in the previous year, while from 1971 onwards it was awarded to books published the same year as the award. The prize was won by J. G. Farrell for Troubles.

Literary agent and archivist Peter Straus has been credited with conceiving the idea of a Man Booker Prize for the missing year after wondering why Robertson Davies's 1970 novel Fifth Business had not been included in the Man Booker Prize shortlist. A longlist of 22 titles was drawn up by organisers. A shortlist of six was selected by Rachel Cooke, Katie Derham and Tobias Hill, and revealed in London on 25 March 2010 when voting commenced on the Man Booker Prize website. Voting closed on 23 April 2010. The winner was announced on 19 May 2010.

Four of the shortlisted authors were dead; only Nina Bawden and Shirley Hazzard were alive to give their reactions to being included. Bawden called it "astonishing actually ... I thought I knew all my books backwards but I couldn't remember what this one was about". Hazzard regretted that her husband, Francis Steegmuller, was no longer alive to witness the occasion. J. G. Farrell won the 1973 Man Booker Prize for The Siege of Krishnapur. Bawden and Muriel Spark were previously shortlisted. Tobias Hill said Patrick White, noted for requesting that The Twyborn Affair be removed from the 1979 Man Booker prize shortlist and known for his general disapproval of receiving awards, would be "spinning in his grave" if he had won the Lost Man Booker Prize for The Vivisector. However, White's literary executor, Barbara Mobbs, said he had left behind "no written evidence" that he would disapprove of a posthumous award and that she was "not going to run around saying take him out".

== Shortlist ==
The shortlist as announced on 25 March 2010:

- Nina Bawden—The Birds on the Trees (Virago)
- J. G. Farrell—Troubles (Phoenix)
- Shirley Hazzard—The Bay of Noon (Virago)
- Mary Renault—Fire from Heaven (Arrow)
- Muriel Spark—The Driver's Seat (Penguin)
- Patrick White—The Vivisector (Vintage)

== Winner ==
The prize was won by J. G. Farrell's Troubles, with 38 percent of the public vote. It received more than twice the number of votes for the second-placed entry. The prize came 40 years after the book's publication and 30 years after Farrell's death. The award of the prize was announced by Antonia Fraser and accepted by Farrell's brother Richard. If Troubles had won the Man Booker Prize in 1970 Farrell would have been the first author to win it twice, as he won it in 1973 for The Siege of Krishnapur. Farrell's literary agent claimed Farrell would have been "thrilled" to have won the prize.

== See also ==
- List of winners and shortlisted authors of the Booker Prize for Fiction
