= Elizabeth Tan (English actress) =

British actress

- Occupation: Actress
- Years active: 2008–present

Elizabeth Tan is a British actress. She is known for her leading roles as Vera Chiang in The Singapore Grip, Emma Taylor in Irish Wish, Maude in the gang drama, Top Boy and Li in Emily in Paris.

== Career ==
In 2011, Tan's first major role portrayed the series regular character of Xin Proctor, a student who was best friends with Tina McIntyre played by Michelle Keegan, in the long-running ITV soap opera, Coronation Street, the show's first regular Chinese character.

Following this, Tan performed as Anna Zhou in Journey's End, the finale of series 4 of Doctor Who, Penny Anderson in New Tricks, Lu Choi in Hustle and the enigmatic Madame Ching in the fantasy drama Spirit Warriors. Other BBC television appearances include Spooks/MI5, Hotel Babylon and the comedy series, Just for Laughs. She also performed her first Bollywood role as Pae in the Amtiaz Ali romantic comedy Love Aaj Kal, starring Saif Ali Khan and Deepika Padukone. Tan also had a role in the movie, Swinging with the Finkels, starring Martin Freeman, Mandy Moore and Melissa George.

In 2013, Tan played Princess Windsor in the BBC One school-based drama series, Waterloo Road. In the series, Princess' storylines involve a rocky relationship with George (Angus Deayton) and a short-lived affair with Kevin Chalk (Tommy Lawrence Knight).

She followed this with her 2019 performance as Maude in the Netflix gang drama Top Boy.

In 2015, Tan appeared as Sulim, a transgender woman, in The Syndicate (with Mark Addy), a BBC drama series depicting a syndicate of workers at a public hospital in Bradford who enter a lottery and win. In the same year, Tan appeared in the BBC series Way to Go as Ryh-Ming, a television sitcom starring Blake Harrison and created by Bob Kushell.

In 2020, Tan appeared in the series regular role of Vera Chiang in the ITV World War II drama, The Singapore Grip, based on the novel of the same title by J. G. Farrell and adapted by Christopher Hampton. She can also be seen in the role of Li in Netflix's drama series Emily in Paris, from the Sex and the City creator, Darren Star, which was released in 2020. She portrays Jun in the Agatha Christie murder mystery, Agatha and the Midnight Murders.

=== Film and television ===
Year	Production	Role	Notes
2024	Irish Wish	Emma Taylor	
2024	Emily in Paris	Li	
2024	High Wire	Ling	
2022	London Kills	Kelly Thompson	
2021	Death in Paradise	Bliss Monroe	Christmas Special 2021
2020	Agatha and the Midnight Murders	Jun	
2020	Top Boy	Maude	
2020	Emily in Paris	Li	
2020	The Singapore Grip	Vera Chiang	
2019	Resting	Linda	
2019	The Verge	Brains	
2019	Access to Work	Brains	
2018	Luck	Angie	
2018	Casualty	Sau Lai	
2015	The Syndicate	Sue Lim	
2015	Way to Go	Ryh-Ming	
2015	New Tricks	Penny Anderson	
2014	Swinging with the Finkels	Pedi	
2013	Waterloo Road	Princess Windsor	
2012	Spirit Warriors	Madame Ching	
2011	Coronation Street	Xin Proctor	Regular role, 46 episodes
2010	Hustle	Lou Choi	
2010	Hotel Babylon	Calli	
2009	Love Aaj Kal	Pae	
2008	Doctor Who	Anna Zhou	Episode: "Journey's End"

=== Theatre ===
Tan's notable theatre roles include, Stephanie, in J.C.Lee's "Luce" at the Southwark Playhouse where she portrayed an American college student dealing with abuse for which she received favourable reviews. She also played a wild teenager, Keiko, in Francis Turnly's "[Harakjuku Girls]" at the Finborough Theatre. Other theatre appearances include her roles as Abigail in Arthur Miller's The Crucible and her portrayal of Bunny, a Korean teenager, in the play, This Isn't Romance at the Soho Theatre.
