= OLL (disambiguation) =

OLL is a step in the CFOP method.

OLL or Oll may also refer to:

- Church of Our Lady of Lourdes Klang, a church located on Jalan Tengku Kelana, Klang, Malaysia
- Oyo Ollombo Airport, IATA code OLL
- Lembit Oll (1966–1999), Estonian chess grandmaster
- Sulev Oll (born 1964), Estonian journalist, sports historian and poet
