= The Bay of Noon =

1970 novel by Shirley Hazzard

- First ed. cover
- Author: Shirley Hazzard
- Language: English
- Genre: Bildungsroman
- Publisher: Little, Brown and Company
- Publication date: 1970 (first edition)
- Media type: Print
- OCLC: 722934449

The Bay of Noon is a 1970 novel by the Australian author Shirley Hazzard. It was shortlisted for the Lost Man Booker Prize in 2010.
