= Irish Wish =

2024 film by Janeen Damian

- Release poster
- Directed by: Janeen Damian
- Written by: Kirsten Hansen
- Produced by: Michael Damian; Brad Krevoy
- Starring: Lindsay Lohan; Ed Speleers; Ayesha Curry; Jane Seymour
- Cinematography: Graham Robbins
- Edited by: Scott Hill
- Music by: Nathan Lanier
- Production companies: Motion Picture Corporation of America; Brad Krevoy Productions
- Distributed by: Netflix
- Release date: March 15, 2024
- Running time: 94 minutes
- Country: United States
- Language: English

Irish Wish is a 2024 American fantasy romantic comedy film directed by Janeen Damian and written by Kirsten Hansen. The film stars Lindsay Lohan and marked her second consecutive project with Netflix, Damian and Damian's husband Michael Damian, who served as a producer on the film alongside Brad Krevoy. Ed Speleers, Alexander Vlahos, Ayesha Curry, Elizabeth Tan, and Jane Seymour also appear in supporting roles.

The plot follows Maddie Kelly (Lohan), a book editor whose dream man is days away from marrying her best friend in Ireland when a spontaneous wish made on an ancient stone magically alters her fate and turns her into the bride.

Irish Wish was officially announced in September 2022 and began production in Ireland that same month. The film was released on March 15, 2024, and debuted at number one on Netflix's most watched films list the day after its release. Irish Wish also received a limited theatrical release with several screenings at the Bay Theater in Los Angeles starting on the same day it became available for streaming. The film received mixed reviews from critics, but Lohan's performance and chemistry with Speleers were praised.

== Plot ==
Maddie Kelly has been secretly in love with Paul Kennedy, the author who she has been editing the past year and whose plot choices and writing she has improved. She has told her mother but not her best friends, Emma and Heather. Just before Maddie is about to tell him about her feelings, Paul asks her to help him write his next novel. He meets Emma and they quickly develop a mutual attraction.

Three months later, the three childhood friends are flying with Paul to his Irish home so he and Emma can get married. Maddie puts her feelings aside to join Heather as bridesmaid. At luggage reclaim, Maddie argues with Englishman James Thomas over his bag, as it is identical to hers. While stuck at the lost luggage office, she insists that the others go on without her. Maddie must travel by bus to the Kennedy house; on board, she exchanges banter with James who is a wildlife photographer.

The three friends, Paul, and his brother Kory go to a lake for a picnic. They decide to take out two rowboats, but Maddie stays behind, feeling like a fifth wheel. She comes across a wishing bench, and a fairy appears as she is saying she wishes Paul was marrying her. After a strong wind blows, Maddie falls back, waking up as the bride-to-be. With her dream seeming to come true, she starts to doubt things. First, a bike ride Paul proposes to her does not work as she is unskilled, so Emma takes her place. Then Maddie is expected to wear an heirloom wedding dress rather than the one she brought.

Hearing and seeing the fairy, Maddie chases after her and falls into James's Triumph TR convertible. Because of the fairy, he has no recollection of their meeting, but Maddie remembers. The hired wedding photographer has quit, and Paul's mother thanks Maddie for finding James as a replacement. Having just discovered the sheep-shearing event he was meant to shoot got cancelled, he accepts.

That night, as Paul gets into bed with Maddie while she is asleep, when he puts his hand on her, it startles her so she punches him. He is not fully recovered by morning, so she goes with James alone to seek picturesque spots for the wedding photos. On their return, a tree goes down from the storm and blocks the road back, so Maddie and James seek shelter in a nearby pub. They spend the evening together playing darts, having a pint and dancing. They get back just in time for the rehearsal, where the fairy, who is revealed to be Saint Brigid of Ireland, startles Maddie.

Maddie soon realizes that her real soulmate is James, not Paul. On the morning of the wedding, James can tell she is sad, but she does not admit it. When Maddie tells the priest about her wish to Saint Brigid, he says she is mischievous, not giving people what they want, but what they need.

Maddie sees Emma before the ceremony and confirms her feelings for Paul, then promises to try to fix it. When it is her turn to walk down the aisle, she enters, wearing regular clothes, and suggests the wedding not go on as they are not in love. Paul jumps James and they fight, as he saw them talking earlier on the grounds, blaming him for her change of heart.

James abruptly leaves, and Maddie follows. He feels badly for being partly to blame for what happened. They kiss, but due to the circumstances, he drives off. Maddie returns to the wishing bench and asks Saint Brigid to take back her wish, so time rewinds again. Paul and Emma marry, and after the reception, Maddie tells him she will not be editing his books without being credited as co-writer. She then finds James on a bench near the pub and he now remembers her from the airport and bus, so they are able to restart.

== Cast ==
- Lindsay Lohan as Madeline "Maddie" Kelly
- Ed Speleers as James Thomas
- Alexander Vlahos as Paul Kennedy
- Ayesha Curry as Heather, Maddie's best friend
- Elizabeth Tan as Emma Taylor, Maddie's best friend and Paul's fiancée
- Jacinta Mulcahy as Olivia Kennedy
- Jane Seymour as Rosemary Kelly, Maddie's mother
- Matty McCabe as Kory Kennedy
- Dawn Bradfield as Saint Brigid
- Maurice Byrne as Sean Kennedy
- James Rottger as Tom O'Callaghan
- Aidan Jordan as Father Callahan
- Dakota Lohan as Finn
- Tim Landers as Murphy
- Rachel Benaissa as Allegra
- Rodrigo Ternevoy as book clerk
- Steve Hartland as Liam
- Carl Shaaban as Jay
- Vincent Moran as bus driver
- Charlie Hughes as immigration officer

== Production ==
=== Development ===
After Lindsay Lohan's return to acting with the holiday romantic comedy Falling for Christmas, Netflix announced in March 2022 they would continue to work with her through a partnership where she would star in two new films. In May 2022, Lohan talked to Forbes about the deal:

The reason why I really clicked with Netflix and Christina Rogers and the people that are involved in Falling for Christmas and the picture deal is because I felt like the romantic comedy movies have kind of dissipated a little bit and I really miss them. This was my forte when I started acting and when I was coming into my teens and coming into my own. I really want to bring that back in the best way that we can. Self-discovery for women in movies, I think also, is a great thing in a happy, fun, lighthearted way. I really miss that and they were onboard with me and that's where the focus is.

On September 1, 2022, Netflix officially announced Irish Wish as part of their two-picture creative partnership with Lohan, and revealed its premise. Lohan reteamed with filmmaker Janeen Damian for the film, after they had previously worked together on Falling for Christmas. Damian was set to direct the screenplay, which was written by Kirsten Hansen. Motion Picture Corporation of America's Brad Krevoy and Riviera Films' Michael Damian would be producing, while Hansen, Amanda Phillips, Jimmy Townsend and Vince Balzano served as executive producers. Hansen said the story was originally set in Italy under the working title "European Wedding" with her first draft being delivered to Krevoy in January 2020 and submitted to Netflix later that year. Damian later talked about Lohan's involvement in the project's development, stating: "She is very involved in the story and really communicative. She's really easy to work with that way."

=== Casting ===
On September 14, 2022, it was announced that Ed Speleers, Alexander Vlahos, Ayesha Curry, Elizabeth Tan and Jane Seymour had joined the cast. Speleers was approached by Netflix to star in the project as he was about to wrap filming for their You series. Curry was cast after longtime friend Lohan encouraged her to return to acting. In November 2022, Seymour revealed on The Late Late Show she would be playing Lohan's character's mother in the film. Despite being busy filming her Harry Wild television series in Ireland at the same time, Seymour managed to shoot her entire role in a day and a half after being asked by the Damians who had previously worked with her in the 2016 film High Strung. Some other actors, such as Jacinta Mulcahey and James Rottger, were also cast after having previously appeared in films directed by Damian. Seymour and Lohan met during fittings for the film despite not filming together.

Lohan talked about her character saying: "She's a bit of a bookworm. She's a nerd, which I loved playing. But she's a sweetheart. She's kind of naive, and she keeps it that way because her head is always focused on writing and stuff," and revealed her brother Dakota would also be appearing in Irish Wish. Lohan stated she resonated with Maddie's journey to independence and self-love and was enthusiastic about going to Ireland for the first time, where her grandfather was from. Damian said Lohan would be doing more physical comedy in the film and did some of her own stunts. Damian said the film "takes place in the summer, it's a love letter to Ireland. It has a lot of really fun physical comedy but also a lot of heart and a little bit of magic [...] Because we had worked together on Falling for Christmas we really could play to [Lohan's] strengths when we were putting this project together." He continued, "It's a 'be careful what you wish for' story. Sometimes you may not get what you want but you get what you need."

=== Filming ===
In August 2022, local media had first reported Lohan would be filming a new film titled Irish Wish in multiple locations across Ireland the following month. Set in modern day Ireland, the film was expected to be released on Netflix in the following year, with Lohan playing the lead role. A casting call for a body double from the production company then revealed principal photography for the film would be taking place in Dublin, Wicklow and Westport, from September 5 to October 14, 2022. Scenic filming took place at Lough Tay, the Cliffs of Moher, Westport's town square, and the Clarence Hotel. Killruddery House was the film location of the "Kennedy House" in the film, and the location of many of the garden scenes including the lily pond and apple orchard; the orangery was the location of the wedding scenes. In late November 2022, Michael and Janeen Damian said the post-production process had already begun. Damian expressed: "Locations were insane. It's so green, your eyes have to re-calibrate. They're like, 'Oh yeah, well, they turn up the color.' No, we had to turn down the color! [sic] I could shots were so green, they're like, 'I think they're going to think this is fake.'"

== Music ==
Irish Wish

Soundtrack album by Nathan Lanier
- Released: March 8, 2024
- Recorded: 2023
- Genre: Film soundtrack
- Length: 45:22
- Label: Netflix
- Producer: Nathan Lanier

The score for Irish Wish, composed by Nathan Lanier, was released on March 8, 2024. For the film's trailer, "Breathless" by Irish band the Corrs was played throughout the scenes. Producer Michael Damian released a track titled "Wild Irish Heart" before the film's release. Lohan's sister Aliana also contributed with two songs for the film, "Armor" and "Comin' Home".

1. "Opening Title"
2. "Welcome to Ireland"
3. "Bus Banter"
4. "The Kennedy House"
5. "Meet the Family"
6. "Loch Té"
7. "The Wishing Chair"
8. "Everything's Different"
9. "Wischief"
10. "Breakfast and Bicycles"
11. "The Dress"
12. "Bride Crash"
13. "That's What I Always Say"
14. "I Kneed You"
15. "Going for a Ride"
16. "Cliffs of Moher"
17. "The Wild Hen"
18. "Mother Waits for No-One"
19. "What's the Rush?"
20. "It's Her?"
21. "Playing Games"
22. "I'd Have Asked You First"
23. "Trippin' at the Airport"
24. "Two Hearts"
25. "In the Garden"
26. "Arrivals and Departures"
27. "Confessions"
28. "The Fighting Irish"
29. "Not Like This"
30. "Back to the Wishing Chair"
31. "Know Thyself"
32. "This Is Amazing"
33. "The Kennedy Wedding"
34. "We're a Perfect Team"
35. "Irish Wish"

== Release ==
On February 1, 2024, Netflix shared the first promotional picture while announcing its release date. In another first look preview for Tudum, Lohan described it as a "nice story of luck and love and confidence." On February 20, the film's official trailer was released.

The film was released on March 15, 2024, on Netflix. The cast attended a premiere screening event on March 5 at the Paris Theater in Manhattan. It debuted at number one on Netflix's most watched films list the day after its release. Samba TV reported the film generated one million US household views during the first 72 hours following its release. It then topped Variety's inaugural Streaming Originals films chart, amassing 699 million minutes watched in its first week of release, according to data provided by Luminate. It went on to become the overall top-streamed title worldwide on Netflix for the week of March 18–24. Netflix CEO Ted Sarandos talked about the movie's reception and its high completion rate in an interview with The New York Times in May 2024, stating: "Irish Wish is great! I am going by the numbers, how many people watch it. I mean, people watch the whole thing. People generally turn off things they don't like in this on demand world. [...] 65 million people watched that movie. It's an enormous hit, and people love it."

Irish Wish also received a limited theatrical release with several screenings at the Bay Theater in Los Angeles starting on the same day it became available for streaming. It was documented that Irish locations featured in the film, namely Lough Tay, saw significant increases in online searches following the film's release, with a Tourism Ireland rep stating they appreciated the country's depiction in it.

== Critical reception ==
On the review aggregator website Rotten Tomatoes, 42% of 62 critics' reviews are positive, with an average rating of 4.3/10. The website's consensus reads: "With Lindsay Lohan in the lead, it almost doesn't matter that Irish Wish is a scattered collection of rom-com clichés." Metacritic, which uses a weighted average, assigned the film a score of 46 out of 100, based on 17 critics, indicating "mixed or average" reviews.

Variety's chief film critic Owen Gleiberman praised the chemistry between Lohan and Speleers, describing the film "as frothy as the foam on a pint of Guinness, as formulaic as the last disposable Netflix rom-com. Yet these two make you believe that they belong together, and not every romantic comedy does that," adding that "Lohan hasn't lost her ability to light up a scene; she has a seasoned radiance. And Speleers [...] is the most charismatic British actor I've seen in quite a while." Samantha Bergeson of IndieWire considered Irish Wish marks a "turning point in Lohan's return to fame" as her executive producer credit is evident as her "fingerprints are all over this cute yet very forgettable film," stating "Speelers anchors the film with A-lister-in-the-making charisma" and comparing the story to 27 Dresses but "the lack of originality smarts here". Benjamin Lee of The Guardian wrote that Lohan's return to mainstream films "needs expediting with another junky Netflix offering that feels beneath her talent", continuining that while "Netflix has specialised in the kind of anodyne content that can be popped on in the background while some ironing is done [...] it's not what we wish for Lohan, an actor back on the ladder who deserves to climb a lot higher than this." Wendy Ide of The Observer claimed: "There are no leprechauns in this abysmal romantic comedy. Otherwise, though, pretty much no theme-park Ireland cliche is left unturned." NPR's Linda Holmes opined that she thought the movie was "super charming."

Writing for RogerEbert.com, Marya E. Gates said Lohan is "an undeniable star and has always succeeded as a screwball comedienne even when the material isn't the greatest" also praising her "palpable" chemistry with Speleers that allows "their patter to sizzle and infuses their romantic moments, like a secretive dart game in a faraway pub, with some actual heat." Emily Zemler of The New York Observer called the film "hopeful and sweet, even when it veers into the ridiculous, and it's a diverting comfort watch during a different time in the world" also noting the chemistry between the leads, with Speleers being "an extremely likable romantic lead" and Lohan "a believable nice girl learning to find her voice and it's hard not to root for her." Nicolas Rapold of The New York Times highlighted a "worthy subplot about Maddie's growing independence from her phone-clingy mother, but mostly the movie is a determinedly mild addition to the Lindsay Lohan 'what-if' universe." Kevin Maher of The Times claimed the film is "genuinely terrible, but also oddly watchable. Lohan, impervious to dreck, is innately sympathetic." Time critic Stephanie Zacharek stated Lohan "gives a standout performance" in the "otherwise lightweight" film as "there's something both appealing and touching about this performance", considering that she "could probably deliver more than Irish Wish asks of her." In March 2026, People named it one of the 13 best Saint Patrick's Day movies.
