= On the Run (novel) =

1964 children's novel by Nina Bawden

- Cover for US edition
- Author: Nina Bawden
- Language: English
- Genre: Children's novel
- Publisher: Victor Gollancz (UK); Lippincott (US)
- Publication date: 1964
- Publication place: United Kingdom
- Media type: Print (Hardback; Paperback)
- Pages: 207 pp
- Preceded by: The House of Secrets

On the Run (also Three on the Run) is a 1964 children's novel by British author Nina Bawden. It was also published as Three on the Run in the United States. It is an independent sequel to The House of Secrets.

== Plot ==
When Ben's cousins, whom he lives with, are unwell, he is forced to spend the summer with his father and stepmother-to-be. They live in London and have little time to spend with Ben. So Ben decides to explore the gardens of the terrace houses in his street. He walks along the walls connecting all the houses until he comes to one covered in jagged glass. Ben then falls into the garden and meets Thomas, a young boy from Tiga, who is being kept in London, while his father, Chief Okapi, is exiled there. When Ben discovers a plot to kidnap Thomas, he, Thomas and Lil (a friend of Thomas) decide to run away.

== Bawden's comments on the book ==
Bawden said that the novel is set in London and in Herne Bay, ‘a seaside town on the coast of Kent’, where Bawden's parents lived. Nina Bawden remarked she intended "to write about children actually escaping — even though temporarily – from the world of grownups".

== Reviews ==
“Children's Literature Review” states that the book sometimes suffers “slightly through being too full of incident”

== Books ==
- On the Run, Faber and Faber, 2009, ISBN 978-0-571-24647-2
