= Troubles (novel) =

1970 novel by J. G. Farrell

- First edition
- Author: J. G. Farrell
- Language: English
- Publisher: Jonathan Cape
- Publication date: 1970
- Publication place: United Kingdom
- Media type: Print (hardcover)
- Pages: 446
- ISBN: 0-224-61900-4
- Followed by: The Siege of Krishnapur

Troubles is a 1970 novel by Irish author J. G. Farrell. It centers the dilapidation of a once-grand Irish hotel (the Majestic), in the midst of the political upheaval during the Irish War of Independence (1919–1921). It is the first instalment in Farrell's acclaimed "Empire Trilogy", preceding The Siege of Krishnapur and The Singapore Grip. Although there are similar themes within the three novels (most notably that of the British Empire), they do not form a sequence of storytelling.

Troubles was well received upon its publication. It won the Geoffrey Faber Memorial Prize and, later, the Lost Man Booker Prize. It was adapted into a made-for-television film in 1988, starring Ian Charleson and Ian Richardson.

In 2010, Sam Jordison in The Guardian called Troubles "a work of genius", and "one of the best books" of the second half of the twentieth century. "Had [Farrell] not sadly died so young," Salman Rushdie said in 2008, "there is no question that he would today be one of the really major novelists of the English language. The three novels that he did leave are all in their different way extraordinary."

== Plot summary ==
The novel concerns the arrival of the English Major Archer, recently discharged from the British Army, at the Majestic Hotel on the County Wexford coast in south-east Ireland in 1919. Both the hotel, and the town in which it is situated, Kilnalough, are fictional. Archer is convinced he is engaged, though sure he had never actually proposed, to Angela Spencer, the daughter of Edward Spencer, the owner of the hotel. She has written to him since they met in 1916 while on leave from the trench warfare of the Western Front.

The Spencers are an Anglo-Irish Protestant family, strongly Unionist in their attitudes towards Ireland's ties to the United Kingdom. Archer functions as a confused observer of the dysfunctional Spencer family, representing the Anglo-Irish, and the local Catholic population. As the novel progresses, social and economic relationships break down, mirrored by the gentle decay of the hotel.

== Characters ==
- Major Brendan Archer – ex-Army Officer and fiancé of Angela Spencer. Archer also appears in Farrell's later novel The Singapore Grip.
- Edward Spencer – owner of the Majestic hotel, his mental decline echoes the physical decline of the hotel itself and also the violence in Ireland.
- Angela Spencer – daughter of Edward Spencer.
- Sarah Devlin – a young woman the Major meets early in the novel and becomes increasingly obsessed with after Angela's death. Apparently disabled in the early parts of the novel.
- Charity and Faith Spencer – younger twin daughters of Edward Spencer. Girls at the start of the novel, they develop into young women and are often depicted as wilful and naive.
- Ripon Spencer – Edward Spencer's adult son.

Other characters include:

- The old ladies staying at the hotel.
- Various servants of the hotel, including the elderly "Murphy" and Seán Murphy, a somewhat suspect young groundsman.
- The inhabitants of Kilnalough, the village near to the hotel, including Sarah's father, a doctor, a priest and others.

== Analysis ==
Farrell develops the insulated environment of the run-down hotel as a reflection on the attitudes of the historically privileged Anglo-Irish, in denial of the violent insurgency of the overwhelming majority (Nationalists/Republicans).

While the Irish War of Independence forms the background to the events of the novel, the political upheaval is not treated as a theme. Apart from occasional news reports concerning the war, the only references to it are chance remarks from the novel's characters. The novel's action takes place mostly within the hotel, with the remainder of the scenes taking place almost entirely in the surrounding areas. As a result, the only characters given a major airing are the Major and the Spencer family, which adds to the claustrophobic, unreal mood of the novel.

== Reviews ==
William Trevor said in The Guardian on 10 October 1970, that the novel was a "clever book" and "a tour de force of considerable quality."

Vivian Mercier wrote in The Nation on 8 November 1971 that Farrell was "a born story-teller".

== Television film ==
In 1988, Troubles was adapted into a 208-minute film for television. Produced for LWT. The film stars Ian Charleson as Major Archer, Ian Richardson as Edward Spencer, Emer Gillespie as Sarah Devlin, Sean Bean as Captain Bolton and Jerome Flynn as Matthews.

== Booker Prize ==
In 2010, Troubles was awarded the Lost Man Booker Prize, a one-time award chosen among books published in 1970 which had not been considered for the Booker Prize at the time. The novel, one of six nominated for the 'Lost' prize, had missed out the first time around because rules about publication dates had changed that year. On 19 May 2010, Troubles was declared the winner.
