= Tom Vaughan (director) =

Scottish TV & film director

- Born: Thomas Vaughan; 5 September 1969 (age 56); Glasgow, Scotland
- Occupations: Television and film director, former child actor
- Years active: 1994–present

Tom Vaughan (born 5 September 1969) is a Scottish television and film director. His work includes Cold Feet (1999) and He Knew He Was Right (2004) for television, and What Happens in Vegas (2008) and Extraordinary Measures (2010) for cinema.

== Early life and education ==
Vaughan was born in Glasgow, Scotland to Peter and Susan Vaughan, and lived in nearby Helensburgh for his first 17 years. He and a friend acquired a video camera from the friend's father, which they used make short films. Vaughan also attended weekend acting classes at the Royal Scottish Academy of Music and Drama, which led to a supporting role in the STV children's television series Stookie. With the £1,000 he made from the series; Vaughan invested in a video camera. He and his friends used it to make more shorts around Helensburgh, such as zombie films, war films and comedies, in locations such as the woods behind his family home, the surrounding hills, and the nearby Clyde Naval Base. For one of the last childhood films he made, he and his friends used their cars for car chases, but were stopped by local police.

Vaughan later moved to England to study drama at the University of Bristol. He graduated with a Bachelor of Arts in Drama in 1990.

== Career ==
After graduating, Vaughan moved to London where he produced his first short film, Super Grass (1994). After theatrical distribution alongside Dazed and Confused, Super Grass was broadcast on Channel 4. Numerous other short films and commercials followed before he began directing mainstream television.

His other works include two episodes of the ITV comedy drama Cold Feet in 1999, one of which featured the first location filming for the show outside England; due to last minute script changes, Vaughan led a small production team and two actors on half a day's filming in Paris, France. In 2003, he directed Deborah Moggach's two-part drama Final Demand for BBC One. The next year, he directed the BBC adaptation of He Knew He Was Right. Vaughan credits his work on the BBC dramas with sharpening his skills as a director, as the tight schedules meant he had to plan ahead.

In 2006, he directed the Playtone/BBC Films feature film Starter for 10, and in 2008 the Regency Enterprises feature film What Happens in Vegas. Starter for 10 got him the job directing the CBS Films feature Extraordinary Measures, starring Brendan Fraser and Harrison Ford. It was released in the United States in January 2010. Vaughan was pleased to be able to work with Ford, as Star Wars had inspired him to make his first amateur films.

In 2011, Vaughan directed the Miley Cyrus feature So Undercover and is scheduled to direct the romantic comedy Boomsday. A screenplay version of Karen Bishko's musical Single is being developed with Vaughan attached to direct.

== Filmography ==
Short film

Year	Title	Director	Writer	Producer
1994	Super Grass	Yes	Yes	No
1996	Box	Yes	Yes	Yes
1997	Still Buzzin'	Yes	Yes	No
1999	Truel	Yes	Yes	No

Feature film

- Starter for 10 (2006)
- What Happens in Vegas (2008)
- Extraordinary Measures (2010)
- So Undercover (2012)
- Some Kind of Beautiful (2014)

TV series

Year	Title	Notes
1993	Opening Shot	Segment of "Sculpting in Cyberspace" (Also producer)
1999	Cold Feet	2 episodes
2007	John from Cincinnati	Episode "His Visit: Day Five"
2007	Big Love	Episode "The Happiest Girl"
2013	Endeavour	Episode "Fugue"
2015	Doctor Foster	3 episodes
2016	Victoria	3 episodes
2020	The Flight Attendant	Episode "Funeralia"
2024	A Good Girl's Guide to Murder	3 episodes

TV movies

- I Saw You (2000)
- Safe as Houses (2000)
- Final Demand (2003)

Miniseries

- He Knew He Was Right (2004)
- Press (2018)
- The Singapore Grip (2020)
