= The Birds on the Trees =

1970 novel by Nina Bawden

- First edition (publ. Longman)
- Author: Nina Bawden
- Language: English
- Publication date: 1970

The Birds on the Trees is a novel by Nina Bawden first published in 1970 about a middle-class English family whose 19-year-old son does not live up to his parents' expectations.

The Birds on the Trees was announced, on 26 March 2010, as one of six books that had been shortlisted for the "Lost Man Booker Prize" of 1970, "a contest delayed by 40 years because a reshuffling of the fledgeling competition’s rules that year disqualified nearly a year’s worth of high-quality fiction from consideration".

== Plot summary ==
Toby Flower is a shy, reticent youth who has grown his hair long and who has started wearing a burnous. His father, an editor, and his mother, a novelist, are thrown into despair when Toby is expelled from school because he has been taking drugs. At a loss as to what to do in order to help their son, Charlie and Maggie Flower keep projecting their own goals and aspirations onto their son. They still talk about his going to university despite Toby's assertion that he is not interested in further education. Toby eventually breaks out of that stifling atmosphere, leaves home and moves to London, where he lives in a basement flat without keeping in touch with his parents.

Charlie and Maggie Flower finally turn to a psychiatrist friend of theirs who agrees to have Toby hospitalised and treated for mental illness. As it happens, in London Toby associates with Hermia, the psychiatrist's young but rather unattractive daughter, and makes her pregnant. When their parents conspire and talk Hermia into having an abortion, they unwittingly cut the last remaining bond with their son. Toby fetches Hermia from her parents' home, and the young couple move in with Toby's maternal grandmother, a frail old woman who all along has been sympathetic to the young people's needs.
