= The Singapore Grip =

Novel by James Gordon Farrell

- First edition
- Author: J. G. Farrell
- Language: English
- Genre: British colonial fiction Postcolonial literature
- Publisher: Weidenfeld & Nicolson
- Publication date: 1978
- Publication place: United Kingdom
- Media type: Print (Hardback)
- Pages: 558
- ISBN: 0-297-77445-X
- Preceded by: The Siege of Krishnapur

The Singapore Grip is a novel by Irish writer J. G. Farrell. It was published in 1978, a year before his death. In 2015, The Straits Times' Akshita Nanda selected The Singapore Grip as one of ten classic Singapore novels. She wrote, "Neatly weaving in snappy, comic summaries of Singapore history as well as the commercial and cultural forces that shaped the trajectory of World War II in South-east Asia and China".

== Synopsis ==
The Singapore Grip is a satirical book about events following Japan's entry into the Second World War by invading South East Asia and swiftly occupying Singapore. The story follows a British family who control one of the colony's leading trading companies. The title derives from a slang phrase for a sexual technique also known as pompoir or Kabzah.

== Reception ==
"A brilliant, complex, richly absurd and melancholy monument to the follies and splendours of Empire", wrote Hilary Spurling for The Times Literary Supplement.

In 2015, Akshita Nanda, writing for The Straits Times, chose ten novels which describe Singapore in the past five decades, The Singapore Grip among their number.

== Television adaptation ==
The Singapore Grip has been adapted as a series for Britain's ITV Television. The series debut was on BBC First in Australia on 26 July 2020. Luke Treadaway, David Morrissey and Elizabeth Tan star in the "epic and ambitious" TV adaptation of Booker Prize winner J.G. Farrell's 1978 novel.
