= The Siege of Krishnapur =

Novel by James Gordon Farrell

- First edition
- Author: J. G. Farrell
- Language: English
- Publisher: Weidenfeld & Nicolson
- Publication date: 1973
- Publication place: United Kingdom
- Media type: Print (Hardcover)
- Pages: 344 pp
- ISBN: 0-297-76580-9
- OCLC: 746629
- Dewey Decimal: 823/.9/14
- LC Class: PZ4.F2448 Si PR6056.A75
- Preceded by: Troubles
- Followed by: The Singapore Grip

The Siege of Krishnapur is a novel by Irish writer J. G. Farrell, first published in 1973.

Inspired by events that purportedly took place before the mutiny of 1857 such as the sieges of Cawnpore (Kanpur) and Lucknow, the book details the siege of a fictional Indian town, Krishnapur, during the Indian Rebellion of 1857. The book portrays the perspective of the British residents. The main characters find themselves subject to the increasing strictures and deprivation of the siege, which reverses the "normal" structure of life where Europeans govern Asian subjects. The book portrays an India under the control of the East India Company, as was the case in 1857. The absurdity of the class system in a town no one can leave becomes a source of comic invention, though the text is serious in intent and tone.

The novel gained positive reviews from a variety of sources, and won the Booker Prize for Fiction in 1973. Farrell used his acceptance speech to attack the sponsors for their business activities. In 2008 the book was shortlisted along with five other former winners for The Best of the Booker.

== Plot ==
The story is set in the town of Krishnapur, and tells of a besieged British garrison which holds out for four months against an army of native sepoys. Among the community are the District Collector, a father of small children, who is an extreme example of Victorian belief in progress, and can often be found daydreaming of the Great Exhibition; the Magistrate, a Chartist in his youth, but who sees his political ideals destroyed by witnessing the siege; Dr. Dunstaple and Dr. McNab, who row over the best way to treat cholera; Fleury, a poetical young man from England who learns to become a soldier; and Lucy, a "fallen woman" who is rescued and eventually runs a tea salon in the despairing community. By the end of the novel, cholera, starvation and the sepoys have killed off most of the inhabitants, who are reduced to eating dogs, horses and finally beetles, their teeth much loosened by scurvy. "The final retreat of the British, still doggedly stiff-upper-lipped through the pantries, laundries, music rooms and ballroom of the residency, using chandeliers and violins as weapons, is a comic delight".

The Siege of Krishnapur is part of Farrell's "Empire Trilogy", which concerns the British Empire and its decline in three locations. Other books in the series are Troubles, which is set during the Irish War for Independence (1919–1921), and The Singapore Grip, which takes place just before the invasion of Singapore by the Japanese in World War II, during the last days of the Empire.

== Reviews ==
Walter Clemons in Newsweek on 21 October 1974 said it was "a work of wit, lively historical reconstruction and imaginative intensity."

John Spurling said in the New Statesman on 21 September 1973, that it was "a masterpiece".

On 2 September 1973, Julian Symons wrote in The Sunday Times that Farrell is "one of the half-dozen British writers under forty whose work should be read by anybody inclined to think that no interesting novels are being written today."
