= Shirley Hazzard =

Australian-born American writer (1931–2016)

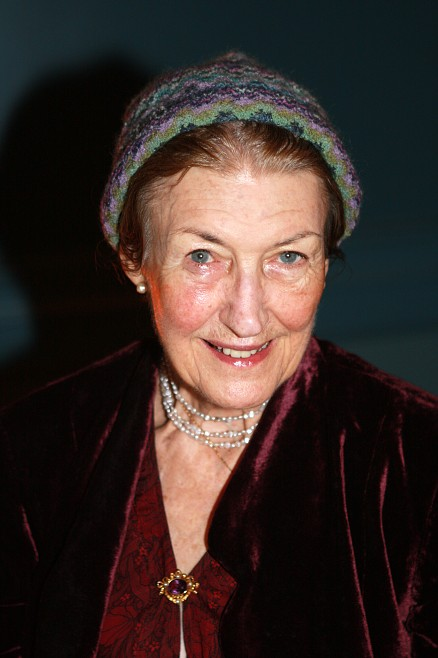
- Shirley Hazzard at a benefit awards dinner 29 October 2007
- Born: 30 January 1931; Sydney, Australia
- Died: 12 December 2016 (aged 85); Manhattan, New York City
- Spouse: Francis Steegmuller (1963–1994; his death)
- Writing career
- Notable works: The Bay of Noon; The Transit of Venus; The Great Fire
- Notable awards: O. Henry Award; National Book Award; Miles Franklin Award; William Dean Howells Medal; National Book Critics Circle Award

Shirley Hazzard (30 January 1931 – 12 December 2016) was an Australian-American novelist, short story writer, and essayist. She was born in Australia and also held U.S. citizenship.

Hazzard's 1970 novel The Bay of Noon was shortlisted for the Lost Man Booker Prize in 2010; her 2003 novel The Great Fire won the U.S. National Book Award for Fiction, the Miles Franklin Award and the William Dean Howells Medal. Hazzard also wrote nonfiction, including two books based on her experiences working at the United Nations Secretariat, which were highly critical of the organisation.

== Early life and education ==
Shirley Hazzard was born on 30 January 1931 in Sydney, New South Wales, the younger daughter of a Welsh father (Reginald Hazzard) and a Scottish mother (Catherine Stein Hazzard). Both parents had immigrated to Australia in the 1920s and met while they were working for the firm that built the Sydney Harbour Bridge.

Hazzard attended Queenwood School for Girls in the Sydney suburb of Mosman, but left in 1947 when her father became a diplomat and was posted to Hong Kong.

Hazzard's parents had intended for her to study at the university there, but it had been destroyed in the war. Instead, at age 16, she began working for the British Combined Intelligence Services, until she was "brutally removed by destiny" – first to Australia, as her sister was ill, and then to New Zealand, when her father became Australian Trade Commissioner there. She said of her experience of the East that "I began to feel that people could enjoy life, should enjoy life".

At age 20, in 1951, Hazzard and her family moved to New York City and she worked at the United Nations Secretariat as a typist for about 10 years. In 1956, she was posted to Naples for a year and began to explore Italy; she visited annually for several years afterward.

== Writing ==
Hazzard wrote her first short story, "Woollahra Road", in 1960 while in Siena, and it was accepted and published by The New Yorker magazine the next year. She resigned from her position at the United Nations and began writing full-time. Her first book, Cliffs of Fall, published in 1963, was a collection of stories that had previously appeared in the magazine. Her first novel, The Evening of the Holiday, was published in 1966. Her second, The Bay of Noon, appeared in 1970, and follows British people in Italy shortly after World War II. The Guardian has called The Transit of Venus, Hazzard's third novel, her "breakthrough". It follows a pair of sisters from Australia who are living very different lives in postwar Britain. American academic Michael Gorra writes: "Its social landscape will be familiar to any reader of Lessing or Murdoch or Drabble, and yet it is not an English novel. Hazzard lacks the concern with gentility – for or against – that marks almost all English writers of her generation. She has the keenest of eyes for the nuances of class ... and yet doesn't appear to have anything herself at stake in getting it all down."

Hazzard's final novel, The Great Fire, appeared more than 20 years later. Its protagonist is a British war hero in Asia a few years after the war.

In addition to fiction, Hazzard wrote two nonfiction books critical of the United Nations: Defeat of an Ideal (1973) and Countenance of Truth (1990). Defeat of an Ideal presents evidence of the apparently widespread McCarthyism in the Secretariat from 1951 to 1955. Countenance of Truth alleges that senior international diplomats had been aware of the Nazi past of Kurt Waldheim yet allowed him to rise through the Secretariat ranks to the position of Secretary-General, a claim she first made in a 1980 New Republic article. Her collection of short stories, People in Glass Houses, is presented as a satire on "The Organisation", manifestly inspired by the United Nations.

Hazzard wrote Greene on Capri, a memoir of her friendship with her husband Francis Steegmuller, a Flaubert scholar, and his comrade in literature and travel Graham Greene, whom she met in the 1960s and considered an influence. Her last work of nonfiction, The Ancient Shore: Dispatches from Naples (2008), is a collection of writings on Naples co-authored by Steegmuller.

=== Style and themes ===
Hazzard admired the writing of Henry James and Ivy Compton-Burnett, and critics have noted similarities to their work, particularly in the use of dialogue. Critics have also called Hazzard's style "austere" and concise.

Hazzard's characters and plots often mirrored events and people in her own life. According to one commentator, Hazzard's early life "was a carbon copy of Helen Driscoll's" (the heroine of The Great Fire). Helen and her brother, the dying Benedict, are described as "wonderfully well-read, a poetic pair who live in literature", and Hazzard once said that poetry had always been the centre of her life. In addition, Helen Driscoll has to move to New Zealand, as Hazzard did. Similarly, the character of Elizabeth in Hazzard's short story "Sir Cecil's Ride" is young, living in Hong Kong, and working for Combined Services Intelligence.

Christine Kearney wrote in The Canberra Times that Hazzard's "fine and formal prose features high-minded protagonists who prize love, beauty and art, and who are frequently hamstrung by the philistines or the callous in their midst", adding, "while Hazzard has a peerless elegance and effortless control over her material, her occasional haughtiness may seem naive to a contemporary audience."

Richard Eder wrote in The New York Times that Greene on Capri "was a two-decade crossword puzzle that the novelist Shirley Hazzard began that day, presuming out of her habitual restraint and courtesy upon the privilege of the tiny literary freemasonry that still could speak yards of poetry by heart."

== Awards and honours ==
In 1977, Hazzard's short story "A Long Story Short", originally published in The New Yorker on 26 July 1976, received an O. Henry Award. The Transit of Venus won the 1980 National Book Critics Circle Award and was included in The Australian Collection, a compendium of Australia's greatest books. The Great Fire garnered the 2003 National Book Award, the 2004 Miles Franklin Award, and the 2005 William Dean Howells Medal; it was also shortlisted for the Orange Prize for Fiction, longlisted for the 2004 Man Booker Prize, and named a 2003 Book of the Year by The Economist. The Bay of Noon was nominated for the Lost Man Booker Prize in 2010.

Hazzard was a fellow of the American Academy and Institute of Arts and Letters and the British Royal Society of Literature, as well as an Honorary Fellow of the Australian Academy of the Humanities. In 1984, the Australian Broadcasting Corporation invited her to give the Boyer Lectures, a series of radio talks delivered each year by a prominent Australian. The talks were published the next year under the title Coming of Age in Australia. In 2012, a conference was held in her honour at the New York Society Library and Columbia University.

== Personal life ==
In 1963, Hazzard married the writer Francis Steegmuller, and the couple moved to Europe. They initially lived in Paris, with visits to Italy, and in the early 1970s settled in Capri. They also kept an apartment in New York City. Hazzard and Steegmuller went to New York in August, "to write in peace, as no one is there", and then returned to Italy in the fall.

Steegmuller died in 1994.

Hazzard died in New York City on 12 December 2016, aged 85. She was reported to have had dementia.

== Works ==
=== Novels ===
- The Evening of the Holiday (1966)
- The Bay of Noon (1970), shortlisted for the Lost Man Booker Prize
- The Transit of Venus (1980), winner of the National Book Critics Circle Award for fiction
- The Great Fire (2003), winner of the National Book Award for fiction and the Miles Franklin Award

=== Short story collections ===
- Cliffs of Fall and Other Stories (1963)
- People in Glass Houses (1967)
- Collected Stories (2020)

=== Non-fiction ===
- Defeat of an Ideal: A Study of the Self-destruction of the United Nations (1973)
- Coming of Age in Australia (1985)
- Countenance of Truth: The United Nations and the Waldheim Case (1990)
- Greene on Capri: A Memoir (2000)
- The Ancient Shore: Dispatches from Naples (2008) (with Francis Steegmuller)
- We Need Silence to Find Out What We Think: Selected Essays (2016)

=== Short stories ===
All stories published in The New Yorker except where noted.

Title	Publication	Collected in
"Woollahra Road"	8 April 1961	Collected Stories
"Vittorio"	17 June 1961	Cliffs of Fall and Other Stories
"Villa Adriana"	5 August 1961	Cliffs of Fall and Other Stories
"The Worst Moment of the Day"	2 September 1961	Cliffs of Fall and Other Stories
"Weekend"	5 May 1962	Cliffs of Fall and Other Stories
"The Picnic"	16 June 1962	Cliffs of Fall and Other Stories
"Cliffs of Fall"	22 September 1962	Cliffs of Fall and Other Stories
"Harold"	13 October 1962	Cliffs of Fall and Other Stories
"The Party"	8 December 1962	Cliffs of Fall and Other Stories
"A Place in the Country"	Published in The New Yorker in two parts: "A Place in the Country": 15 June 1963 "A Leave-Taking": 13 July 1963	Cliffs of Fall and Other Stories
"In One's Own House"	Mademoiselle (October 1963)	Cliffs of Fall and Other Stories
"The Flowers of Sorrow"	17 October 1964	People in Glass Houses
"Comfort"	24 October 1964	Collected Stories
"The Evening of the Holiday"*	17 April 1965	* Excerpt from The Evening of the Holiday
"Out of Itea"	1 May 1965	Collected Stories
"Nothing in Excess"	26 March 1966	People in Glass Houses
"The Meeting"	23 July 1966	People in Glass Houses
"A Sense of Mission"	4 March 1967	People in Glass Houses
"Swoboda's Tragedy"	20 May 1967	People in Glass Houses
"The Story of Miss Sadie Graine"	10 June 1967	People in Glass Houses
"Official Life"	24 June 1967	People in Glass Houses
"The Separation of Dinah Delbanco"	22 July 1967	People in Glass Houses
"The Everlasting Delight"	19 August 1967	Collected Stories
"Leave It to Me"	Meanjin Quarterly (Summer 1971)	Collected Stories
"The Statue and the Bust"	McCall's (August 1971)	Collected Stories
"Sir Cecil's Ride"	17 June 1974	Collected Stories
"A Long Story Short"*	26 July 1976	* Excerpt from The Transit of Venus
"A Crush on Doctor Dance"*	18 September 1977	* Excerpt from The Transit of Venus
"Something You'll Remember Always"*	17 September 1979	* Excerpt from The Transit of Venus
"She Will Make You Very Happy"*	26 November 1979	* Excerpt from The Transit of Venus
"Forgiving"	Ladies' Home Journal (January 1984)	Collected Stories
"The Place to Be"*	29 June 1987	* Excerpt from The Great Fire
"In These Islands"*	8 June 1990	* Excerpt from The Great Fire
"Longing"*	Antaeus (Autumn 1994)	* Excerpt from The Great Fire
