= The Transit of Venus =

1980 novel by Shirley Hazzard

- First edition
- Author: Shirley Hazzard
- Language: English
- Publisher: Viking Press
- Publication date: 1980
- Publication place: Australia
- Media type: Print
- Pages: 352 (first edition)
- ISBN: 9780140107470 (first edition)

The Transit of Venus is a 1980 novel written by Australian author Shirley Hazzard. It won the 1980 National Book Critics Circle Award. It was chosen as the 53rd best novel of all time in a list by the Guardian in 2026.

== Overview ==
Two orphaned Australian sisters, Caroline and Grace Bell, emigrate to England in the 1950s. A young astronomer, Ted Tice, falls in love with Caroline, and the next thirty years of his life are dedicated to his pursuit of her; however, Caroline prefers the unscrupulous Paul Ivory, a playwright. Meanwhile, Grace settles into marriage with officious bureaucrat Christian Thrale.

The Sydney Review of Books wrote of the novel:

The novel is about the greater humanity that one gains by refusing glibness, resisting the cheap shot. Ted Tice rejects the accidental (and thus cheap, illusory and illegitimate) power offered by merely perceiving another’s weakness and exploiting it. The novel is a call to resist vulgar power, the type gained through reduction, through first impressions, through stereotype or quick certainty. For a person of Ted’s moral fibre, the end will never justify the means. The only advantage he will accept is that bestowed on him by his own strength of character.
