= Church of Our Lady of Lourdes Klang =

Church of Our Lady of Lourdes
- Malay: Gereja Our Lady of Lourdes
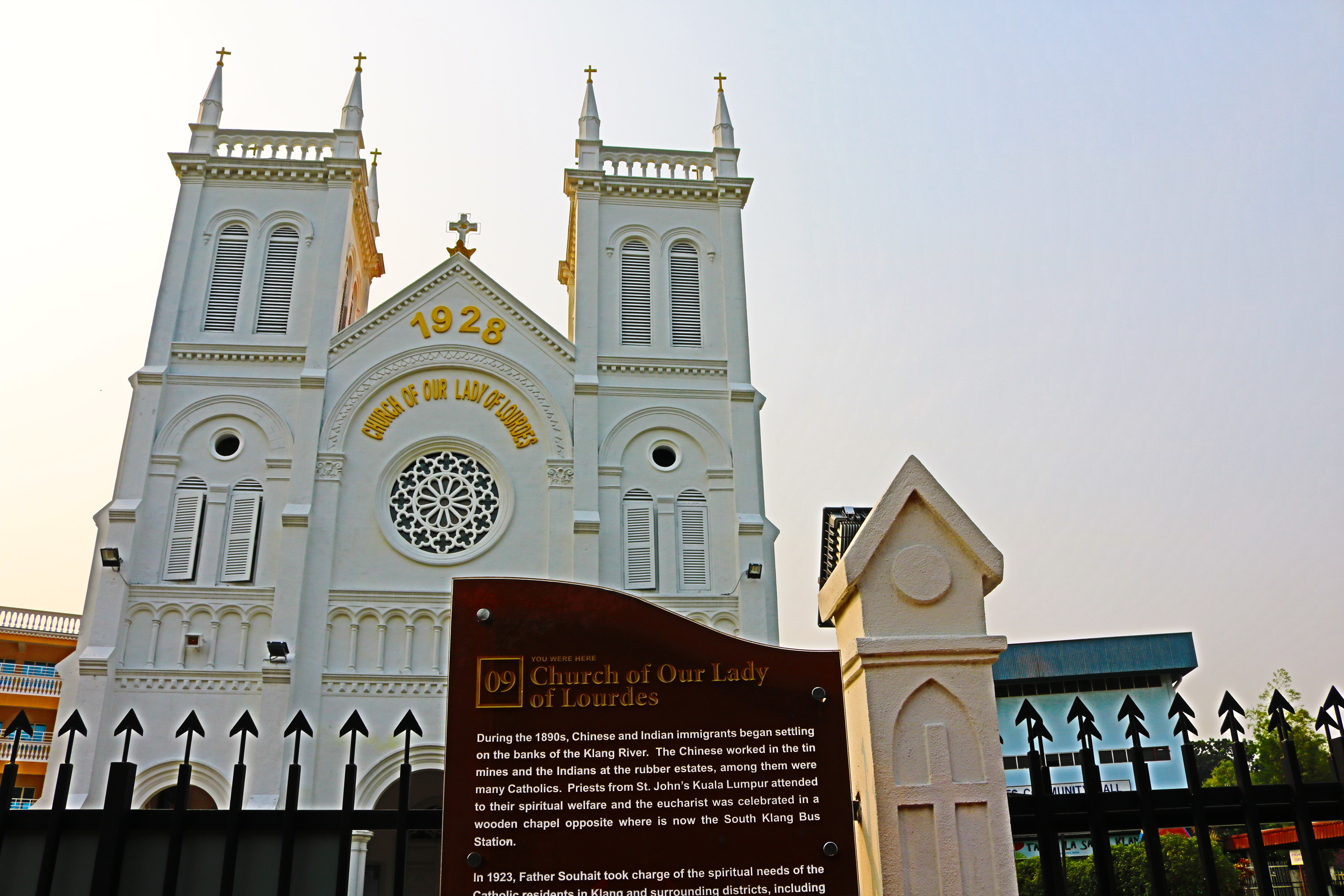
- Church of Our Lady of Lourdes, Klang
- Church of Our Lady of Lourdes
- 3.037327°N 101.444405°E
- Location: Jalan Tengku Kelana, Klang
- Country: Malaysia
- Denomination: Roman Catholic
- Website: http://ollklang.org/

History
- Status: Active

Architecture
- Architectural type: Gothic Revival
- Years built: 1928

Administration
- Archdiocese: Roman Catholic Archdiocese of Kuala Lumpur

The Church of Our Lady of Lourdes (OLL) is a Catholic church built in 1928 on Jalan Tengku Kelana, Klang, Malaysia. The current parish priest is Rev. Fr. Jude Gregory Chan and is assisted by Rev. Fr. Gnanaselvam Berentis. The church had celebrated its 80-year "Jubilee" in 2008 after the church building had undergone some restoration and repainting works. Additionally, a new four-storey formation centre, named Wisma Lourdes, had been added to the church's complex in order to meet the increasing number of students and classes needed for Sunday School. Wisma Lourdes also houses the parochial house.

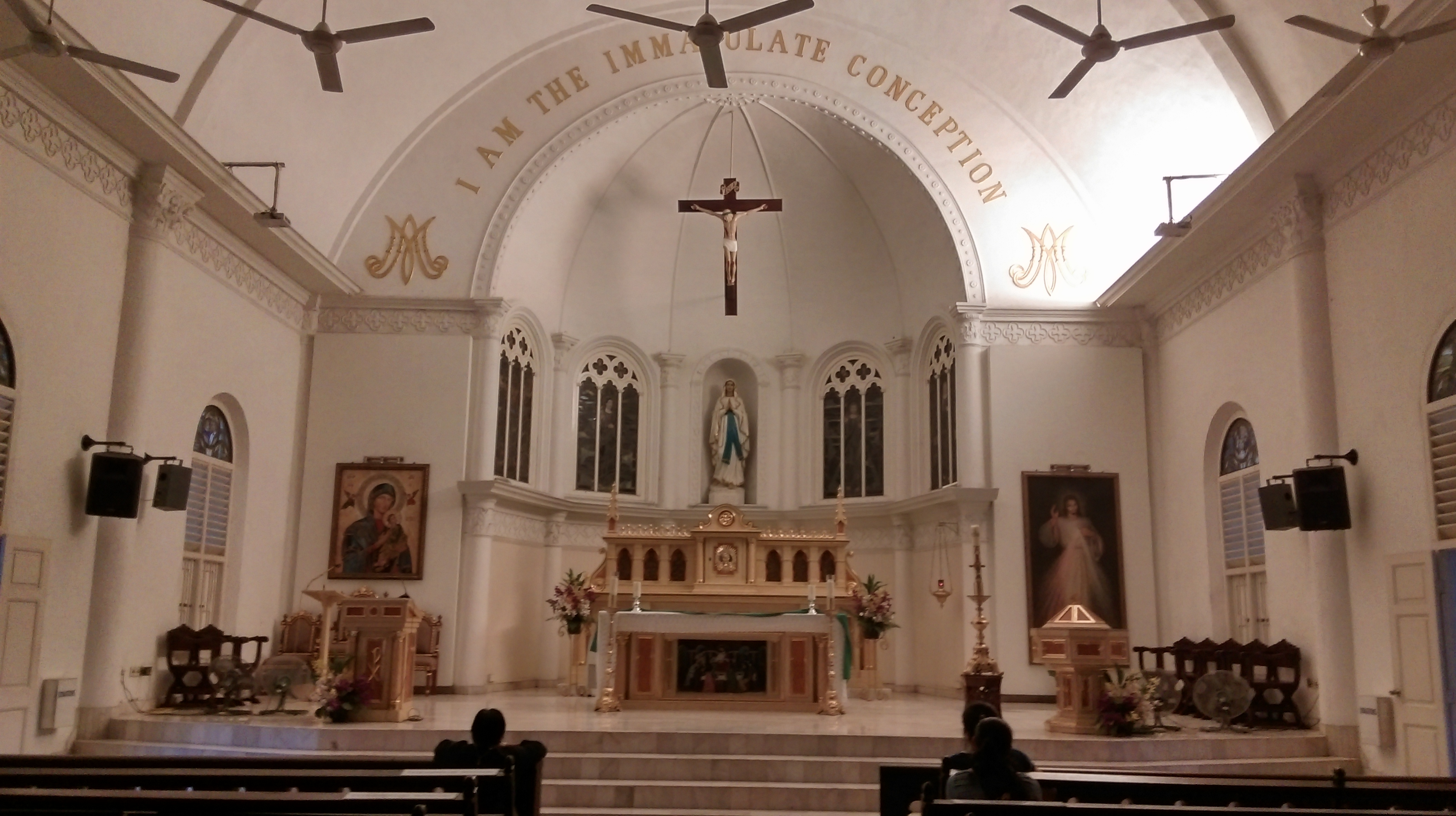
The interior of the Church of Our Lady of Lourdes Klang.

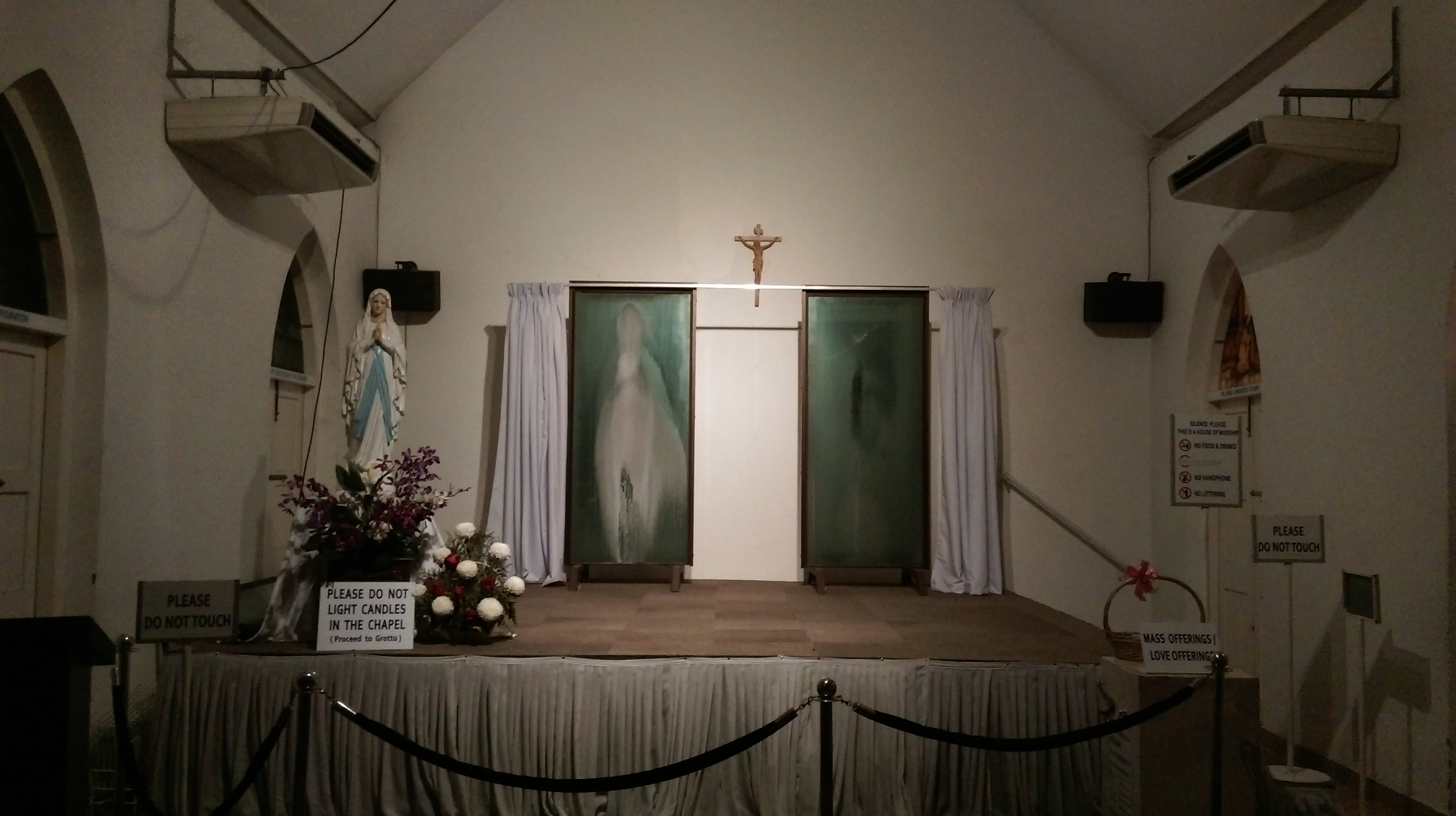
Glass panes believed to show the Virgin Mary image (left) and the face of Jesus (right).

== Attractions ==
=== Annual Novena Feast Celebration ===
The annual novena (translation: nine-day) feast celebration of Our Lady of Lourdes tends to attract thousands of Catholic pilgrims to the church, particularly in the month of February with the celebration of the World Day of the Sick on 11 February as instituted by Pope John Paul II on 13 May 1992. The annual novena feast celebration is usually culminated with an outdoor procession, drawing hundreds of faithful with a missional goal by way of a communal participation.

=== Relic of Maria Goretti ===
On 8 February 2015, a first-class relic of Maria Goretti was placed by the Archbishop of Kuala Lumpur, The Most Reverend Julian Leow, within the altar of the church and was witnessed by 1,300 congregants.

=== Glass panes depicting images of Mary and Jesus ===
In 2012, two glass panes believed to showcase images of the Virgin Mary and the face of Jesus were moved to the church from the Sime Darby Medical Centre in Subang Jaya (SJMC). These panes are available for viewing from 9:00a.m. to 5:00p.m. daily.

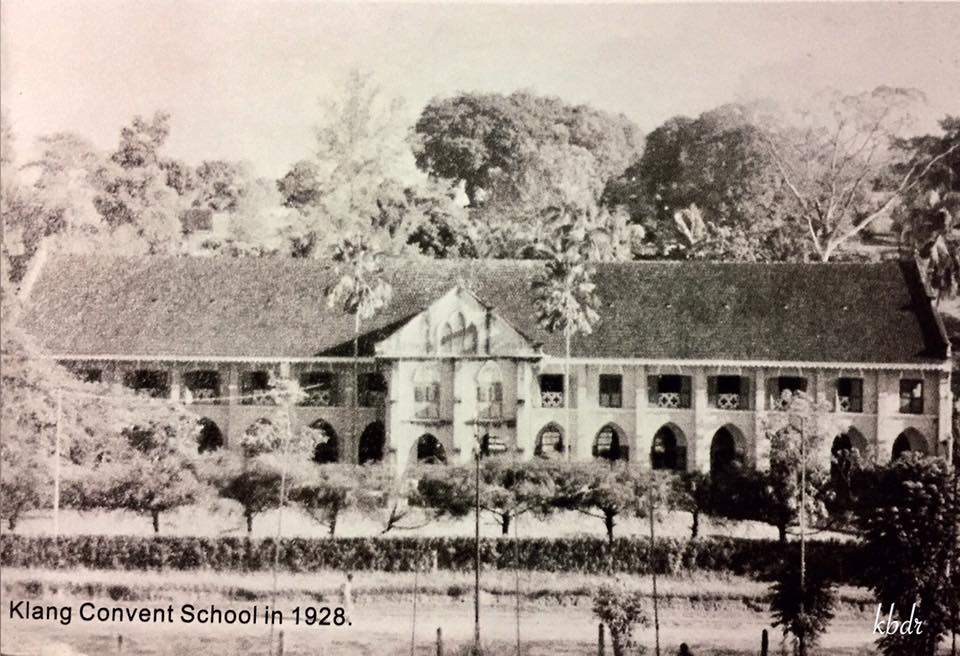
Convent of the Holy Infant Jesus (photographed in 1928)

=== Convent Klang ===
Adjacent to the church is the Convent of the Holy Infant Jesus and its convent schools for girls (primary and secondary). SMK Convent Klang traces its roots back to 1924 when it was established as a branch of Convent Bukit Nanas, managed by the Sisters of the Infant Jesus in Kuala Lumpur. One of Klang's oldest missionary schools, it started as a private school in a shophouse on Rembau Street with just 19 students and quickly grew. The new convent school opened in January 1928. The architecture features a symmetrical design centered around an impressive two-story entrance block.

As of 2023, ownership of the school remains with the Sisters.

Convent Klang celebrated its centenary in 2024 when 730 primary and 1,100 secondary schoolgirls constituted the student cohort.

Both the Church of Our Lady of Lourdes and Convent Klang feature in the Klang Heritage Walk.

== See also ==
- Christianity in Malaysia
