= J. G. Farrell =

English-born writer of Irish descent (1935–1979)

- Born: James Gordon Farrell; 25 January 1935; Liverpool, England
- Died: 11 August 1979 (aged 44); Bantry Bay, County Cork, Ireland
- Resting place: St James' Church, Durrus
- Education: Brasenose College, Oxford
- Occupation: Novelist
- Writing career
- Notable works: Troubles (1970); The Siege of Krishnapur (1973); The Singapore Grip (1978)
- Notable awards: Geoffrey Faber Memorial Prize (1971); Booker Prize (1973); Lost Man Booker Prize (2010)

James Gordon Farrell (25 January 1935 – 11 August 1979) was an English-born novelist of Irish descent. He gained prominence for a series of novels known as "the Empire Trilogy" (Troubles, The Siege of Krishnapur and The Singapore Grip), which deal with the political and human consequences of British colonial rule.

Troubles received the 1971 Geoffrey Faber Memorial Prize, and The Siege of Krishnapur received the 1973 Booker Prize. In 2010, Troubles was retrospectively awarded the Lost Man Booker Prize, created to recognise works published in 1970. Troubles and its fellow shortlisted works had not been open for consideration that year due to a change in the eligibility rules.

== Biography ==
=== Early life and education ===
Farrell, born in Liverpool, England, into a family of an Irish background, was the second of three brothers. His father, William Farrell, had worked as an accountant in Bengal and, in 1929, he married Prudence Josephine Russell, a former receptionist and secretary to a doctor. From the age of 12, he attended Rossall School in Lancashire. After World War II, the Farrells moved to Dublin, following which Farrell spent much time in Ireland. This, perhaps combined with the popularity of Troubles, leads many to regard him as an Irish writer. After leaving Rossall, he taught in Dublin and also worked for some time on Distant Early Warning Line in the Canadian Arctic. In 1956, he went to study at Brasenose College, Oxford; while there he contracted polio. This left him partially disabled and disease was prominent in his works. In 1960, he left Oxford with third-class honours in French and Spanish and went to live in France, where he taught at a lycée.

=== Early works ===
Farrell published his first novel, A Man From Elsewhere, in 1963. Set in France, it shows the clear influence of French Existentialism. The story follows Sayer, a journalist for a communist paper, as he tries to find skeletons in Regan's closet. Regan is a dying novelist who is about to be awarded an important Catholic literary prize. The book mimics the fight between the two leaders of French existentialism: Jean-Paul Sartre and Albert Camus, Sayer representing Sartre and Regan as Camus. The two argue about existentialism: the position that murder can be vindicated as an expedient in overthrowing tyranny (Sartre) versus the stance that there are no ends that justify unjust means (Camus). Bernard Bergonzi reviewed it in the New Statesman's 20 September 1963 issue, writing: "Many first novels are excessively autobiographical, but A Man from Elsewhere suffers from the opposite fault of being a cerebral construct, dreamed up out of literature and the contemporary French cinema." Simon Raven wrote in The Observer on 15 September 1963: "Mr. Farrell's style is spare, his plotting lucid and well timed; his expositions of moral or political problems are pungent if occasionally didactic." It entirely lacks the ironic humour and tender appreciation of human frailty that characterise his later work. Farrell came to dislike the book.

Two years after this came The Lung, in which Farrell returned to his real-life trauma of less than a decade earlier: the main character Martin Sands contracts polio and has to spend a long period in hospital. It has been noted that it is somewhat modelled after Farrell, but it is modelled more after Geoffrey Firmin from Malcolm Lowry's 1947 novel, Under the Volcano. The anonymous reviewer for The Observer on 31 October 1965 wrote that "Mr. Farrell gives the pleasantly solid impression of really having something to write about", and one for The Times Literary Supplement on 11 November 1965 that "Mr. Farrell's is an effective, potent brew, compounded of desperation and a certain wild hilarity."

In 1967, Farrell published A Girl in the Head. The protagonist, the impoverished Polish count Boris Slattery, lives in the fictional English seaside town of Maidenhair Bay, in the house of the Dongeon family (believed to be modelled after V. S. Naipaul's A House for Mr Biswas). His marriage to Flower Dongeon is decaying. His companion is Dr. Cohen, who is a dying alcoholic. Boris also has sex with an underage teenager, June Furlough, and fantasises about Ines, a Swedish summer guest, the titular "girl in the head". Boris is believed to be modelled on Humbert Humbert in Vladimir Nabokov's Lolita. Like its two predecessors, the book met only middling critical and public reaction. In the 13 July 1967 issue of The Listener, Ian Hamilton wrote that he disliked the novel, and thought it was, at best, an "adroit pastiche" of Samuel Beckett's deadbeats. Martin Levin in The New York Times Book Review on 23 March 1969 praised Farrell's "flair for giving the ridiculous an inspired originality". An anonymous reviewer in The New York Times Book Review on 20 July 1967 wrote: "verbal assurance and resourcefulness show that Mr. Farrell is not content to coast along merely imitating his previous work. Such a deliberate extension of range is perhaps a hopeful sign for a talent which, after three novels, still has not found the mode in which to fulfil its attractive promise."

=== Empire Trilogy ===
Troubles tells the comic yet melancholy tale of an Englishman, Major Brendan Archer, who in 1919 goes to County Wexford in Ireland to reunite with his fiancée, Angela Spencer. From the crumbling Majestic Hotel at Kilnalough, he watches Ireland's fight for independence from Britain. Farrell started writing the book while on a Harkness Fellowship in the United States and finished it in a flat in Knightsbridge, London. He got the idea for the setting from going to Block Island and seeing the remains of an old burned-down hotel. He won a Geoffrey Faber Memorial Prize for the novel, and with the prize money travelled to India to research his next novel. In 2010, Troubles was awarded the Lost Man Booker Prize.

Farrell's next book, The Siege of Krishnapur, and his last completed work, The Singapore Grip, both continue his story of the collapse of British colonial power. The former deals with the Indian Rebellion of 1857. Inspired by historical events such as the sieges of Cawnpore and Lucknow, the novel is set in the fictional town of Krishnapur, where a besieged British garrison succeeds in holding out for four months against an army of native sepoys in the face of enormous suffering before being relieved.

The third of the novels, The Singapore Grip, centres upon the Japanese capture of the British colonial city of Singapore in 1942, while also exploring at some length the economics and ethics of colonialism at the time, as well as the economic relationships between developed and Third World countries.

The three novels are in general linked only thematically, although Archer, a character in Troubles, reappears in The Singapore Grip. The protagonist of Farrell's unfinished novel, The Hill Station, is Dr McNab, introduced in The Siege of Krishnapur; this novel and its accompanying notes make the series a quartet.

When The Siege of Krishnapur won the Booker Prize in 1973, Farrell used his acceptance speech to attack the sponsors, the Booker Group, for their business involvement in the agricultural sector in the Third World.

Charles Sturridge scripted a film version of Troubles made for British television in 1988 and directed by Christopher Morahan.

=== Death ===
In 1979, Farrell decided to quit London to live on the Sheep's Head peninsula in County Cork, Ireland. A few months later he drowned on the coast of Bantry Bay after falling into the sea from rocks while angling. He was 44.

"Had he not sadly died so young," Salman Rushdie said in 2008, "there is no question that he would today be one of the really major novelists of the English language. The three novels that he did leave are all in their different way extraordinary."

Farrell is buried in the churchyard of the St James' Church, a Church of Ireland parish church in Durrus. The manuscript library at Trinity College, Dublin, holds his papers: Papers of James Gordon Farrell (1935–1979). TCD MSS 9128-60.

=== Legacy ===
Peter Morey wrote that "an interpretation of the novels of J. G. Farrell and Paul Scott as examples of post-colonial fiction [is possible], since both partake of oppositional and interrogative narrative practices which recognize and work to dismantle the staple elements of imperial narrative."

Derek Mahon dedicates his poem "A Disused Shed in County Wexford" to Farrell, possibly in reference to the topic of Troubles.

Ronald Binns described Farrell's colonial novels as "probably the most ambitious literary project conceived and executed by any British novelist in the 1970s."

In the 1984 novel Foreign Affairs by Alison Lurie, Vinnie Miner, the protagonist, reads a Farrell novel on her flight from New York to London. In the 1991 novel The Gates of Ivory by Margaret Drabble, the writer Stephen Cox is modelled on Farrell.

== Quotes ==
Farrell said to George Brock in an interview for The Observer, "the really interesting thing that's happened during my lifetime has been the decline of the British Empire."

== List of works ==
Early works

- A Man from Elsewhere (1963)
- The Lung (1965)
- A Girl in the Head (1967)

Empire Trilogy

- Troubles (1970)
- The Siege of Krishnapur (1973)
- The Singapore Grip (1978)

Published posthumously

- 1973–74: The Pussycat Who Fell in Love with a Suitcase. Atlantis. 6 (Winter 1973/4), pp. 6–10
- 1981: The Hill Station; and An Indian Diary, unfinished, edited by John Spurling. London : Weidenfeld and Nicolson. ISBN 0-297-77922-2

== Awards ==
- 1971: Geoffrey Faber Memorial Prize (Troubles)
- 1973: Booker Prize (The Siege of Krishnapur)
- 2010: Lost Man Booker Prize (Troubles) awarded for the year 1970
