= List of military science fiction works and authors =

This is a list of works in the military science fiction subgenre of science fiction, sorted by the creator's surname or, in case of film and television, the title.

Literature - Television, film, and video games - References - Further Reading

== Literature ==
=== A ===
==== Allen, Roger MacBride ====
- Torch of Honor (1985)
- Rogue Powers (1986)

==== Anderson, Poul ====
- The Star Fox (1965)
- The Corridors of Time
- Technic Civilisation Books

==== Anvil, Christopher ====
- The Steel, the Mist and the Blazing Sun (1983)

==== Asprin, Robert Lynn ====
- Phule's Company (humorous)
- The Cold Cash War

=== B ===
==== Baldwin, Bill ====
- The Helmsman Saga
- Canby's Legion (1995)

==== Buettner, Robert ====
- Jason Wander series
- Orphan's Legacy Series

==== Bujold, Lois McMaster ====
- Shards of Honor (1986)
- Barrayar (1991)
- The Warrior's Apprentice (1986)
- The Vor Game (1990)
- Ethan of Athos (1986)

==== Bunch, Chris ====
- The Sten Chronicles (with Allan Cole)
- The Last Legion series

=== C ===
==== Campbell, Jack ====
Real name: Hemry, John G.

- The Lost Fleet series (2006)
- "Dead End" (written as John G. Hemry) appearing in Breach the Hull, edited by Mike McPhail and published by Dark Quest Books
- "Grendel" a Lost Fleet story appearing in So It Begins, edited by Mike McPhail and published by Dark Quest Books
- "Dawn's Last Light" (written as John G. Hemry) appearing in By Other Means, edited by Mike McPhail and published by Dark Quest Books
- Stark's War (2000-2002) series (written as John G. Hemry), a trilogy covering a conflict between US Army soldiers and their leadership during a campaign that takes place on the Moon.

==== Card, Orson Scott ====
- Ender's Game (1985)

==== Cherryh, C. J. ====
- Faded Sun series

==== Chesney, George ====
- The Battle of Dorking (1871)

==== Cook, Glen ====
- Passage at Arms (1985)

==== Cragg, Dan ====
- StarFist series (with David Sherman)
- Jedi Trial (with David Sherman) (2004)

=== D ===
==== Dalmas, John ====
- The Lizard War series
- The Regiment series

==== Dickson, Gordon R. ====
- Dorsai! (The Genetic General 1960; exp vt Dorsai! 1976)
- The Genetic General (1960)

==== Dietz, William C. ====
- Legion series
- The Flood

==== Douglas, Ian ====
Real name: Keith, William H. Jr.

Galactic Marines Series:

Heritage Trilogy

- Semper Mars (1998) ISBN 978-0-380-78828-6
- Luna Marine (1999) ISBN 978-0-380-78829-3
- Europa Strike (2000) ISBN 978-0-380-78830-9

Legacy Trilogy

- Star Corps (2003) ISBN 978-0-380-81824-2
- Battlespace (2006) ISBN 978-0-380-81825-9
- Star Marines (2007) ISBN 978-0-380-81826-6

Inheritance Trilogy

- Star Strike (2008) ISBN 978-0-06-123858-1
- Galactic Corps (2008) ISBN 978-0-06-123862-8
- Semper Human (2009) ISBN 978-0-06-123864-2

Star Carrier Series:

- Earth Strike (2010) ISBN 978-0-06-184025-8
- Center of Gravity (2011) ISBN 978-0-06-184026-5
- Singularity (2012) ISBN 978-0-06-184027-2

==== Doyle, Debra ====
- The Mageworlds Series

==== Drake, David ====
- Hammer's Slammers series
- RCN Series

=== F ===
==== Forsberg, John ====
- Sol War Series (2012) ISBN 0615695035

==== Frankowski, Leo ====
- The War with Earth (2003) with Dave Grossman
- Kren of the Mitchegai (2004) with Dave Grossman
- The Two-Space War (2004)

=== G ===
==== Garfinkle, Richard ====
- Celestial Matters (1996)

==== Gerrold, David ====
- Starhunt (1987)

==== Green, Roland J. ====
- Peace Company series
- Starcruiser Shenandoah series
- Voyage to Eneh (2000)

==== Gunn, David ====
- Death's Head series

=== H ===
==== Haldeman, Joe ====
- The Forever War (1975)

==== Hamilton, Peter F. ====
- Fallen Dragon (2001)

==== Harrison, Harry ====
- Bill, the Galactic Hero (1965, humorous)
- West of Eden (1984)

==== Heinlein, Robert A. ====
- Space Cadet (1949)
- The Long Watch (1950)
- Starship Troopers (1958)

==== Hemry, John G. ====
Alias: Jack Campbell

- The Lost Fleet series

==== Huff, Tanya ====
Valor Confederation - Staff Sergeant Torin Kerr's aim is to keep both her superiors and her company of space marines alive as they deal with lethal missions throughout the galaxy.

- Valor's Choice (2000)
- The Better Part of Valor (2002)
- A Confederation of Valor (2006 (Omnibus edition of Valor's Choice and The Better Part of Valor)
- The Heart of Valor (2007)
- Valor's Trial (2008)
- The Truth of Valor (2010)

=== K ===
==== Keith, William H. Jr. ====
Alias: Ian Douglas

- Semper Mars: Book One of the Heritage Trilogy (1998)

==== Kent, Steven L. ====
- The Clone series

==== Kloos, Marko ====
- Frontline Series
- Palladium Wars Series

==== Kornbluth, Cyril M. ====
- "The Only Thing We Learn" (1949)

==== Kratman, Tom ====
- A Desert Called Peace (2007)
- Carnifex (2008)
- The Lotus Eaters (April 2010)
- The Amazon Legion (April 2011)

=== L ===
==== Lang, Hermann ====
- The Air Battle (1859)

==== Lang, Simon ====
- All the Gods of Eisernon (1973)
- The Elluvon Gift (1975)
- The Trumpets of Tagan (1992)
- Timeslide (1993)
- Hopeship (1994)

==== Laumer, Keith ====
- Bolo series of books

==== Lee, Sharon ====
- Liaden Universe series of books
- Crystal Soldier
- Crystal Dragon
- Balance of Trade
- Trade Secret
- Local Custom
- Scout's Progress
- Mouse and Dragon
- Conflict of Honors
- Agent of Change
- Carpe Diem
- Plan B
- Fledgling
- I Dare
- Saltation
- Ghost Ship
- Necessity's Child
- Dragon Ship

=== M ===
==== McDonald, Sandra ====
- The Outback Stars

==== McLaughlin, Dean ====
- Hawk Among the Sparrows (1968)

==== Moon, Elizabeth ====
- Vatta's War series
- Serrano / Familias series

==== Morgan, Richard K. ====
- Takeshi Kovacs series

=== N ===
==== Nagata, Linda ====
- The Red: First Light

==== Niven, Larry ====
- The Man-Kzin Wars (Known Space future History, Shared World; 3 vols 1988-90)

==== Norton, Andre ====
- Star Guard (1955)

==== Nylund, Eric ====
- Halo: The Fall of Reach
- Halo: First Strike
- Halo: Ghosts of Onyx

=== P ===
==== Pournelle, Jerry E. ====
- A Spaceship for the King (1973)
- The Mercenary (1977)

Posey, Jay

- Outriders series

=== R ===
==== Reynolds, Mack ====
- Mercenary from Tomorrow (1962 "Mercenary"; exp 1968)

==== Ringo, John ====
- Legacy of the Aldenata series
- Posleen War - Central Storyline
  - A Hymn Before Battle (2000)
  - Gust Front (2001)
  - When the Devil Dances (2002)
  - Hell's Faire (2003)
- Hedren War
  - Eye of the Storm (2009)
- Posleen War Sidestories
  - Watch on the Rhine (2005)
  - Yellow Eyes (2007)
  - The Tuloriad (2009) (with Tom Kratman)
- Cally's War Spinoff Series
  - Cally's War (2004)
  - Sister Time (2007) (with Julie Cochrane)
  - Honor of the Clan (2009) (with Julie Cochrane)
- Empire of Man Series

Also known as the "Prince Roger Series", Co-written with David Weber

  - March Upcountry
  - March to the Sea
  - March to the Stars
  - We Few (2005)
- The Council Wars Series
  - There will be Dragons
  - Emerald Sea
  - Against the Tide
  - East of the Sun, West of the Moon

==== Rosenberg, Joel ====
- Not For Glory (1988)

==== Rowley, Christopher ====
- The War for Eternity
- The Black Ship
- The Founder
- To A Highland Nation
- Starhammer
- The Vang: The Military Form
- The Vang: The Battlemaster

=== S ===
==== Saberhagen, Fred ====
- Berserker series (1963)

==== Scalzi, John ====
- Old Man's War series (2005)

==== Scarborough, Elizabeth Ann ====
- The Healer's War (1988)

==== Shelley, Rick ====
- Dirigent Mercenary Corps

==== Shepherd, Mike ====
- Kris Longknife series (2004)

==== Sherman, David ====
- The StarFist series (with Dan Cragg)
- The DemonTech series
- Jedi Trial (with Dan Cragg) (2004)
- "Surrender and Die" a DemonTech series story appearing in So It Begins, edited by Mike McPhail and published by Dark Quest Books
- "Delaying Action" appearing in By Other Means, edited by Mike McPhail and published by Dark Quest Books

==== Spinrad, Norman ====
- The Men in the Jungle (1967)
- The Big Flash (1969)

==== Steakley, John ====
- Armor (1984)

==== Stirling, S M ====
- Kzin series
- Falkenberg series
- Marching Through Georgia (1984)

=== T ===
==== Tanaka Yoshiki ====
- Legend of the Galactic Heroes

==== Taylor, Travis S. ====
- Tau Ceti series
- Von Neumann's War

==== Traviss, Karen ====
- Star Wars: The Clone Wars
- Star Wars Republic Commando series
- Star Wars Imperial Commando: 501st

=== W ===
==== Weber, David ====
- Honor Harrington series
- Safehold series

==== Wells, H. G. ====
- War of the Worlds (1898)

==== White, Steve ====
- Insurrection (1990) with David Weber.
- Crusade (1992) with David Weber.
- Death Ground (1997) with David Weber.

==== Williams, Walter Jon ====
- Dread Empire's Fall series

==== Williamson, Michael Z. ====
- Freehold series
- A Long Time Until Now

Wehr, Dietmar

- The Phoenix Empire series
- The Synchronicity War series
- The Glory Game series
- The Battle For Mars series

== Television, film, and video games ==
=== Films ===
- The 5th Wave, based on the novel series of the same name.
- Aliens (1986)
- All You Need Is Kill (2025)
- Appleseed (2004)
- Appleseed Alpha (2014)
- Appleseed Ex Machina (2007)
- Avatar (2009)
- Avatar: The Way of Water
- Avatar: Fire and Ash
- Battle: Los Angeles (2011
- Battleship (2012)
- Bloodshot
- Captain America: The First Avenger (2011)
- The Day the Earth Stood Still (2008)
- Doom (2005)
- Doom: Annihilation (2019)
- Edge of Tomorrow (2014)
- Ender's Game (2013)
- Godzilla (1998)
- Godzilla (2014)
- Independence Day (1996)
- Independence Day: Resurgence (2016)
- Lifeforce (1985)
- The Mandalorian and Grogu (2026)
- The Matrix Revolutions
- Overlord
- Pacific Rim
- Pacific Rim Uprising (2018)
- Predator film series (1987, 1990, 2010, 2018)
- Primitive War (2025)
- Screamers (1995)
- Spectral (2019)
- Rogue One
- Rogue Trooper (2026)
- Soldier (1998)
- Solo: A Star Wars Story
- Spectral (2016)
- Stargate (1994)
- Stealth (2005)
- Starship Troopers (1997)
- Starship Troopers 2: Hero of the Federation
- Starship Troopers 3: Marauder
- Starship Troopers: Invasion
- Starship Troopers: Traitor of Mars
- Star Wars: Episode I – The Phantom Menace (1999)
- Star Wars: Episode II – Attack of the Clones (2002)
- Star Wars: Episode III – Revenge of the Sith (2005)
- Star Wars: Episode IV – A New Hope (1977)
- Star Wars: Episode V – The Empire Strikes Back (1980)
- Star Wars: Episode VI – Return of the Jedi (1983)
- Star Wars: Starfighter (2027)
- Star Wars: The Clone Wars (2008)
- Star Wars: The Force Awakens (2015)
- Star Wars: The Last Jedi (2017)
- Star Wars: The Rise of Skywalker (2019)
- Terminator Salvation (2009)
- Titan A.E. (2000)
- The Tomorrow War (2021)
- Transformers film series (2007, 2009, 2011, 2014, 2017)
- Vexille (2007)
- War Machine
- War of the Worlds (2005)

=== Television and video games ===
- Ace Combat
- Aldnoah.Zero
- Andromeda
- Argento Soma
- Armored Trooper Votoms
- Armored Core
- Arpeggio of Blue Steel
- Astro Plan
- Babylon 5
- Banner of the Stars
- Battlefield 2042
- Battlestar Galactica
- BattleTech: The Animated Series
- B-Fighter Kabuto
- Borderlands (series)
- Binary Domain
- Call of Duty series
- Captain Scarlet and the Mysterons
- Chōriki Sentai Ohranger
- Code Geass
- Combat Mecha Xabungle
- Command & Conquer
- Crysis
- Dengeki Sentai Changeman
- Exosquad
- Gears of War
- Galactic Drifter Vifam
- Gears of War
- Genesis Climber Mospeada
- Ghost in the Shell
- Gunbuster
- Gundam
- Half-Life: Opposing Force
- Halo (series)
- Juukou B-Fighter
- Kidō Senkan Nadeshiko
- Killzone
- Legend of the Galactic Heroes
- Macross
- Marathon Trilogy
- Mass Effect
- Metal Gear
- Metal Slug
- Metroid
- Mobile Suit Gundam
- Muv-Luv
- Outwars
- Resistance (series)
- Robotech
- Rogue Trooper
- SeaQuest DSV
- Space: Above and Beyond
- Space Battleship Yamato
- Special Armored Battalion Dorvack
- Star Blazers
- StarCraft (series)
- Stargate Atlantis
- Stargate SG-1 (1997–2007), created by Brad Wright & Jonathan Glassner
- Stargate Universe
- Starship Operators
- Star Trek: Deep Space Nine
- Star Wars: Clone Wars
- Star Wars: The Clone Wars
- Strike Witches
- The Super Dimension Cavalry Southern Cross
- The Super Dimension Fortress Macross
- The Super Dimension Century Orguss
- Terrahawks
- Time Crisis
- Titanfall
- UFO
- Vanquish
- Warhammer 40,000
- XCOM
