= John Ringo bibliography =

Published works by John Ringo

This is the complete list of works by American military science fiction writer John Ringo.

== Bibliography ==
=== Series ===
==== Black Tide Rising ====
The series is based on a zombie apocalypse, but deals with living, near-rabid, infected humans rather than the living dead. The story centers around a family of survivalists (mother, father, and two teenage daughters) who get early warning of the plague; they escape by boat, only to realize that they are the best hope for others stranded at sea.

- Under a Graveyard Sky (September 2013; ISBN 1-4516-3919-8)
- To Sail a Darkling Sea (February 2014; ISBN 1-4767-3621-9)
- Islands of Rage and Hope (August 2014; ISBN 978-1-4767-3662-4)
- Strands of Sorrow (January 2015; ISBN 978-1-4767-3695-2)
- The Valley of Shadows (November 2018; ISBN 978-1-4814-83551), co-written with Mike Massa
- River of Night (July 2019; ISBN 978-1-4814-8421-3), co-written with Mike Massa

===== Black Tide Rising Anthologies =====
1. Black Tide Rising (June 2016; ISBN 978-1-4767-8151-8), anthology co-edited with Gary Poole
2. Voices Of The Fall (March 2019; ISBN 978-1-9821-2558-5), anthology co-edited with Gary Poole
3. We Shall Rise (June 2021; ISBN 978-1-9821-2558-5), anthology co-edited with Gary Poole
4. United We Stand (March 2024; ISBN 978-1-9821-9326-3), anthology co-edited with Gary Poole

===== Black Tide Rising novels written by other authors =====
- At the End of the World (July 2020; ISBN 978-1-9821-2469-4), by Charles E. Gannon
- At the End of the Journey (May 2021; ISBN 978-1-9821-2522-6), by Charles E. Gannon
- Mountain of Fire (September 2024; ISBN 978-1-9821-9361-4), by Jason Cordova
- Across an Ocean of Stars (April 2025; ISBN 978-1-6680-7254-7), by Robert E. Hampson
- Perdition's Storm (November 2025; ISBN 978-1-9648-5641-4), by Brian Trent

===== The Graphic Novel =====
- Black Tide Rising: The Graphic Novel co-written with Chuck Dixon (June 2023; ISBN 978-1-9821-9263-1)

==== The Council Wars ====
1. There Will Be Dragons (November 2003; ISBN 0-7434-7164-4)
2. Emerald Sea (July 2004; ISBN 0-7434-8833-4)
3. Against the Tide (February 2005; ISBN 0-7434-9884-4)
4. East of the Sun, West of the Moon (May 2006; ISBN 1-4165-2059-7)

==== Empire of Man ====
Also known as the "Prince Roger Series"

Co-written with David Weber, with multiple books still under contract

1. March Upcountry (May 2001; ISBN 0-671-31985-X)
2. March to the Sea (August 2001; ISBN 0-671-31826-8)
3. March to the Stars (December 2003; ISBN 0-7434-3562-1)
4. We Few (April 2005; ISBN 0-7434-9881-X)

Omnibus collections

1. Empire of Man (February 2014) ISBN 1476736243; collects March Upcountry and March to the Sea
2. Throne of Stars (August 2014; ISBN 978-1-4767-3666-2); collects March to the Stars and We Few

==== Last Judgment’s Fire ====
Co-written with Kacey Ezell and Christopher L. Smith, this is a post-apocalyptic series centered on a young farmer in search of his destiny who tries to prevent a cataclysmic war. It is set thirty years after "giant electrovoric ants and pterodons" came through a rift in space-time, killing millions of people and disrupting nearly all electrical power systems and generation worldwide.

- Gunpowder & Embers (January 2020; ISBN 978-1-9821-2428-1)

==== Legacy of the Aldenata ====
Also known as the "Posleen Series" and "Posleen War Series" after the name of the invading species besetting and successfully conquering much of Earth.

===== Posleen War—Central storyline =====
- A Hymn Before Battle (October 2000; ISBN 0-671-31941-8)
- Gust Front (April 2001; ISBN 0-671-31976-0)
- When the Devil Dances (April 2002; ISBN 0-7434-3540-0)
- Hell's Faire (January 2003; ISBN 0-7434-3604-0)

===== Hedren War =====
- Eye of the Storm (July 2009); (ISBN 1-4391-32739)

===== Posleen War side stories =====
- Watch on the Rhine (August 2005; with Tom Kratman; ISBN 0-7434-9918-2)
- Yellow Eyes (April 2007; with Tom Kratman; ISBN 1-4165-2103-8)
- The Tuloriad (October 2009; with Tom Kratman; ISBN 978-1-4391-3304-0)

===== Cally's War spinoff series =====
Co-written with Julie Cochrane, this series is more cloak-and-dagger spy-genre fiction, with humans striving to overcome the game rigged by the Darhel race, which has the rest of the galaxy's races in virtual thralldom—except for the Posleen and humans, whom they fear. The Darhel systematically use humans to combat the Posleen, while bleeding the humans whenever and wherever possible by underhanded clandestine acts to weaken the future options of humanity.

1. Cally's War (October 2004; with Julie Cochrane; ISBN 0-7434-8845-8)
2. Sister Time (December 2007; with Julie Cochrane; ISBN 1-4165-4232-9)
3. Honor of the Clan (January 2009; with Julie Cochrane; ISBN 1-4165-5591-9)

===== Spinoff books =====
This sequel is set about a millennium after the other main Posleen Series works.

- The Hero (June 2004; with Michael Z. Williamson; ISBN 0-7434-8827-X)

==== Monster Hunter Memoirs ====
This series was created after reading Monster Hunter Nemesis. Mr. Ringo wrote most of these three books in about a month. After talking to Larry Correia, the pair was able to put the MHI series under an existing contract between Ringo and Corriea. Series takes place in the Monster Hunter International Universe during the 1980's and follows a hunter named Chad Gardenier. Co-written with Larry Correia

1. Monster Hunter Memoirs: Grunge (August 2016; ISBN 978-1-4767-8149-5)
2. Monster Hunter Memoirs: Sinners (December 2016; ISBN 978-1-4767-8183-9)
3. Monster Hunter Memoirs: Saints (July 2018; ISBN 978-1-4814-8307-0)

==== Paladin of Shadows ====
This is a series of contemporary-era techno-thrillers, much like Tom Clancy's works but with less politics and a closer-to-the-ground level and action focus.

Ringo has stated that these novels stemmed from a nagging idea between contracted books. He believed that the concept was too over-the-top and offensive to be of much interest to his usual audience, and so wrote the first book with no intention of publishing it, as a way to get the idea out of his head. However, during interactions with fans, he mentioned the unpublished story and was surprised that the premise was met with enthusiasm. The Paladin of Shadows series contain graphic scenes of rape, bondage, torture, and underage sex, as Ringo's protagonist's anti-terrorism missions butt heads with harsh economic realities of commercial sexual slavery in Eastern Europe and its connection to funding arms for terrorist organizations.

1. Ghost (2005; ISBN 1-4165-0905-4)
2. Kildar (March 2006; ISBN 1-4165-2064-3)
3. Choosers of the Slain (July 2006; ISBN 1-4165-2070-8)
4. Unto the Breach (Dec 2006; ISBN 1-4165-0940-2)
5. A Deeper Blue (2007; ISBN 1-4165-2128-3)
6. Tiger by the Tail (2013; with Ryan Sear; ISBN 1-4516-3856-6)

The central hero, Michael Harmon (A.K.A. Mike Jenkins, A.K.A. Ghost), is a self-proclaimed sadist, repressed rapist, former United States Navy Boatswain's Mate 1st Class, and a trainer of US Navy SEALs. While walking after a class on the campus of the University of Georgia, he witnesses a woman being kidnapped. He impulsively follows the kidnapper and rescues several abducted women and earns the gratitude of several nations, a small fortune, and a series of high-level political connections in the process of experiencing a life change. The work is, in fact, three connected anti-terrorism novellas spanning about a year, backstory omitted from the last two, where "Jenkins" takes on a certain James Bond–style sole operator/loose cannon role. The work features scenes involving the interception of two nuclear devices, saving Paris and Washington, D.C., while featuring a travelogue through part of the seamier sides of the Balkans and European parts of the former Soviet Union.

In the second work, Harmon buys an estate in the eastern Europe country of Georgia that has an entailed ancient warrior tribe, called the Keldara, who bestow on him the honorific "The Kildar" (Warlord, Baron, or similar title). The Keldara aid him in reducing tensions in the Caucasus. Again the book shows a life transition, this time from a sole shooter to a politically connected local warlord. In subsequent books the tribe, now being trained up into a superb light company, goes operational and is employed as a deniable black-ops force by the United States for the next several works. By A Deeper Blue, some of the Keldaran force has been trained in both SCUBA and HALO jumps, while Tiger by the Tail shows the force on an extended training mission in the Pacific, gradually being transformed en toto into a force equivalent to U.S. Navy SEAL Teams—but in company strength.

Other major/recurring characters in the Paladin of Shadows series include Charles Adams, a retired SEAL Master Chief; intel specialist and former USMC Sergeant Patrick Vanner; United States Army War College graduate Colonel David Nielson, a retired Special Ops Civil Affairs Specialist who serves as Mike's de facto Chief of Staff and the only American officer on his senior staff; Captains Kasey Bathlick and Tamara Wilson (call signs Dragon and Valkryie), two Marine Corps helicopter pilots; Captain John Hardesty, a charter pilot for Chatham Aviation in England/former Royal Air Force major/squadron leader who frequently flies Mike around the globe; Colonel Bob Pierson, the Office of Strategic Operations Liaison at the Pentagon who serves as one of Mike's primary contacts within the United States government; 2nd Lieutenant Britney "Bambi" Harder, who was rescued by Mike in Ghost and by A Deeper Blue is a junior intelligence officer at United States Special Operations Command Headquarters, MacDill Air Force Base, Florida; Anastasia Rakovitch, a masochistic 26-year-old Russian-born woman given to the Kildar by an Uzbek sheikh who now serves as his harem manager; Daria Koroleva, the Kildar's personal assistant; Katya "Cottontail" Ivanova, the sociopathic man-hating whore-turned-spy and assassin; and David and Amanda Cliff, the President and First Lady of the United States.

==== Shadow's Path ====
1. Not that Kind of Good Guy (May 2025; ISBN 978-1668072592; sample)
2. Welcome to the Jungle (with Casey R. Moores; October 2025; ISBN 978-1668072899)

==== Special Circumstances ====
These novels describe the Foundation for Love and Universal Faith (FLUF), an organization whose members include Druids, Wiccans, Asatru, Buddhists, and other non-traditional religions. They assist the FBI and other law enforcement agencies worldwide in investigating events and crimes involving the supernatural, which is termed 'Special Circumstances' by the FBI.

1. Princess of Wands (January 2006; ISBN 1-4165-0923-2)
2. Queen of Wands (August 2012; ISBN 1-4516-3789-6)

==== Transdimensional Hunter ====
Inspired by Pokémon Go during a time when Ringo was struggling with depression. The story is about youth woman named Lynn Raven who is recruited to play the Transdimensional Hunter game. But there is more to this game than meets the eye. Series is set in near future 2040s Cedar Rapids, Iowa. Co-written with Lydia Sherrer.

1. Into the Real (April 2022) ISBN 978-1982126001)
2. Through the Storm (November 2023) ISBN 978-1982193843)
3. Behind the Veil (August 2025) ISBN 978-1964856315)
4. Beyond the Rift (February 2026) ISBN 978-1964856506)

==== Starry Starry Knight ====
New series with the first book being published in February 2027. Joseph Smith went to sleep in 2025 and wakes in 3128.

1. Starry Starry Knight (February 2027) ISBN 978-1668073780)
2. A Red Maned Star (Upcoming)
3. Azrael's Outposts (Possible Title)
4. The Pit's Red Wrath (Possible Title)

==== Troy Rising ====
The Troy Rising series was inspired by Howard Tayler's webcomic Schlock Mercenary and its universe. It was created with Tayler's approval, but is not considered canon for the webcomic series. The series is set in the early days of human-alien contact, with humans forced to defend the Earth from the alien invasion.

1. Live Free or Die (February 2010; ISBN 1-4391-3332-8) sample chapters
2. Citadel (January 2011; ISBN 1-4391-3400-6) sample chapters
3. The Hot Gate (May 2011; ISBN 1-4391-3432-4) sample chapters

==== Voyage of the Space Bubble ====
Also called the Looking Glass series.

All books titles in the series are phrases taken from the poem "Jabberwocky", which is mentioned repeatedly in the later novels.

1. Into the Looking Glass (May 2005; ISBN 0-7434-9880-1)
2. Vorpal Blade (September 2007; with Travis S. Taylor; ISBN 1-4165-2129-1)
3. Manxome Foe (February 2008; with Travis S. Taylor; ISBN 1-4165-5521-8)
4. Claws that Catch (November 2008; with Travis S. Taylor; ISBN 1-4165-5587-0)

=== Non-series novels ===
- The Road to Damascus (March 2004; a Bolo book with Linda Evans; ISBN 0-7434-7187-3)
- Von Neumann's War (August 2006; with Travis S. Taylor; ISBN 1-4165-2075-9)
- The Last Centurion (August 2008; ISBN 1-4165-5553-6)
- Beyond the Ranges (May 2024; with author James Aidee; ISBN 978-1982193379)

=== Substack ===
In March of 2023 John Ringo started a Substack page called Ringo's Tavern for his writing. Many of the books are not complete but this is a reference for what has been published on the substack so far.

==== Mike Truesdale stories ====
1. Not That Kind of Good Guy (March 2023) Note: This was published as a novel in May 2025
2. Where the Moon Meets the Water (July 2023)
3. Welcome to the Jungle (September 2023) Note: This was published as a novel in Oct 2025
4. Surviving the Game (January 2024)
5. The Kraken (April 2024)
6. The Shadow (June 2024)
7. The Creep (September 2024)

Prequel stories for Mike Truedale; these are short stories

1. "When MS13 Came to East Baltimore" (October 2024)
2. "Michael and Los Tres Muertos" (October 2024)
3. "Michael and the Fifth Street Kings Pt 1" (October 2024)

==== Short stories ====
- "Gondola Tales: The Old Dog" (November 2024)
- "Gondola Tales: The Nine Thousand Team" (November 2024)

==== Incomplete stories ====
The following group is from novels that are incomplete, set in Ringo's pre-Substack published works. To date none of these works have completed to the point where they can be published.

- Troy Rising IV: The Ringing Deeps (December 2024)
- Special Circumstances III: Queen of Swords
- Black Tide Rising/Kildar Crossover: In Patience to Abide (April 2025)

=== Short stories ===
- "Let's Go to Prague" (2003)
  - included in The Service of the Sword (ISBN 0-7434-3599-0) edited by David Weber, and is set in Weber's Honorverse.
- "A Ship Named Francis" (2003)
  - included in The Service of the Sword (ISBN 0-7434-3599-0) edited by David Weber, and is set in Weber's Honorverse.
- Other contributions to Jim Baen's Universe—launched in 2005, a members-only science fiction and fantasy e-zine edited by Eric Flint.
