= Empire of Man (disambiguation) =

Empire of Man can refer to:

- Empire of Man, a series of space opera and military SF novels
- The Empire of Man, a major playable faction in the Warhammer Fantasy wargame
- The Great Empire of Man, part of the Dune SF series continuity
