= Legacy of the Aldenata =

Fictional universe by John Ringo

The Legacy of the Aldenata, also known as the Posleen War Series, is the fictional universe of one of John Ringo's military science fiction series.

== Premise ==
The central premise is that in 2001, humanity receives greetings from a highly advanced, peaceable Galactic Federation. However, all is not well, for a species of aggressive aliens known as the Posleen are attacking the Galactics. Since the Galactics are almost entirely unable to fight, they are appealing to the proven military abilities of humanity for aid.

However, things are rarely as simple as they seem, and humanity soon discovers that the Galactics are no friends at all. There are plots within plots, some going back to the dawn of humanity and beyond: plots that endanger the very survival of humanity.

The first four novels cover the Posleen War in which the Posleen invade Earth. Another novel, Cally's War (and its two sequels), takes up the story a few decades later; The Hero is set nearly a thousand years later. Watch on the Rhine takes place immediately after Gust Front and extends until March 2008, with the very last chapter taking place at some unspecified point far after the end of Hell's Faire but prior to the beginning of The Hero.

A role-playing game based on the d20 system and the Legacy of the Aldenata was included on the free CD-ROM included in the first hardcover edition of Hell's Faire.

The fourth novel Hell's Faire includes some Sluggy Freelance guest strips by Pete Abrams since the popular internet comic strip is featured somewhat prominently in a way. (A massive armored military vehicle is named after Bun-Bun the mini-lop from the strip.) Some of the strips are samples of the actual comic strip and others are an exclusive alternate timeline setting where the Sluggy characters have to deal with the Posleen invasion.

As the Posleen have yellow blood, the war song "March of Cambreadth" ("Let their yellow blood run cold") becomes popular with the military. The song, its lyrics, and artist's bio is included in the Baen Free Library.

== Books ==
=== Main series storyline ===
Posleen War

- A Hymn Before Battle (2000) (ISBN 0-671-31941-8)

With the Earth in the path of the rapacious Posleen, the peaceful and friendly races of the Galactic Federation offer their resources to help the backward Terrans—for a price.

- Gust Front (2001) (ISBN 0-671-31976-0)

Our choice was simple: we could be cannon fodder, or we could be ... fodder. We could send our forces to fight and die (as only humans can) against a ravening horde that was literally feeding on its interstellar conquests, or remain as we were: virtually weaponless and third in line for brunch.

We chose to fight.

- When the Devil Dances (2002) (ISBN 0-7434-3540-0)

After five years of battling invaders, human civilization prepares a strike to drive the aliens from the Earth. But the Clan-Lord of the Sten has learned from the defeats human have dealt him, and has his own battle plan. When he squares off against Major Michael O'Neal, the only winner will be Satan himself...

- Hell's Faire (2003) (ISBN 0-7434-3604-0)

With the defenses of the Southern Appalachians sundered, the only thing standing between the ravening Posleen hordes and the soft interior of the Cumberland Plateau are the veterans of the 555th Mobile Infantry.

Hedren War

- Eye of the Storm (2009); ISBN 1-4391-3273-9

=== Posleen War sidestories ===
- Watch on the Rhine (2005) (with Tom Kratman; ISBN 0-7434-9918-2)
- Yellow Eyes (2007) (with Tom Kratman; ISBN 1-4165-2103-8)
- The Tuloriad (2009) (with Tom Kratman; ISBN 978-1-4391-3304-0) sample chapters

=== Cally's War spinoff series ===
- Cally's War (2004) (with Julie Cochrane) (ISBN 0-7434-8845-8)
- Sister Time (2007) (with Julie Cochrane) (ISBN 1-4165-4232-9)
- Honor of the Clan (2009) (with Julie Cochrane) (ISBN 1-4165-5591-9)

=== Spinoff books ===
- The Hero (2004) (with Michael Z. Williamson; ISBN 0-7434-8827-X)

=== Future books ===
According to John Ringo's website, two more books in the series are planned, titled Beneath the Avalanche (2015) and Master of the Winds (2020). The latest information regarding last two books in series as at September 2017 is that Ringo is working on other projects and has no current plans to finish these two books.

=== Fanon ===
Two electronic books have been created by a fan and are considered canon by Baen Barflies, but the canonical status of such works is uncertain. The titles are "The Yeomen of England" and "Holy War" set in England and Saudi Arabia respectively written by Christopher Nuttall, currently available for free download at his website.

== Military forces ==
The series premises total mobilization of the human population of Earth. The human forces in the service of the Galactic Federation are divided into the Fleet (the space navy), and Fleet Strike (the ground forces component, combining marines, special forces, and previously airborne units). In the books written thus far, Fleet Strike has had the lion's share of attention.

The technology made available includes rejuvenation and life extension. The desperate straits of the setting lead to the revival of the Waffen-SS in The Watch on the Rhine. With the rejuvenations in full swing in Germany, many ex-SS officers have become young again. In the novel, the majority of the ex-SS were just soldiers; only a few are hardcore Nazis. This causes a lot of dissent in the German Parliament and citizenry. The "Greens" and the "Reds" (nicknames for the German political parties Alliance 90/The Greens and the Social Democratic Party of Germany) organize riots and protests; the re-integration of the SS officers and the choice of the Parliament and Chancellor to give to those officers control of the training of the young men of Germany.
