= Yelloweye =

Yelloweye may refer to:

- The Yellow-eye mullet, a fish in the family Mugilidae
- The Yelloweye rockfish, a fish in the family Sebastidae
- Coats' disease, an eye disease

== See also ==
- Yellow Eyes, a science fiction novel
