= March to the Stars =

2003 novel by David Weber and John Ringo

- First edition
- Author: David Weber & John Ringo
- Illustrator: John Ringo (maps)
- Cover artist: Patrick Turner
- Language: English
- Series: Empire of Man\Roger MacClintock series
- Genre: Science fiction
- Publisher: Baen Books
- Publication date: 2003
- Publication place: United States
- Media type: Print (paperback)
- Pages: 589
- ISBN: 0-7434-8818-0
- OCLC: 54879677
- Preceded by: March to the Sea
- Followed by: We Few

March to the Stars is the third novel in the science fiction series of the Empire of Man by David Weber and John Ringo. It tells the story of Prince Roger MacClintock and his remaining bodyguards of the Empress' Own Regiment who get marooned on the alien planet of Marduk due to an act of sabotage on their ship, and must continue fighting their way towards the planetary spaceport in order to get back home to Earth. The book appeared on the New York Times best seller list.

== New Characters Introduced ==
Temu Jin is an undercover agent of the Imperial Bureau of Investigations (IBI) assigned to Marduk to investigate possible treasonous activity on the part of the imperial governor. Though a native of Pinopa, he does not speak with a Pinopan accent except in times of stress. A highly competent and professional individual, he feels an enormous amount of contempt towards those who are not capable of equal professionalism. He becomes aware of the Marines' presence on Marduk shortly before they arrive at Kirsti and begins helping them, first by concealing their presence and then with providing them with the information they need to capture the spaceport.

Pedi Dorson Acos Lefan Karuse is a begai, a war child of the Shin tribes and the strong-willed daughter of the chieftain of Mudh Hemh. As the daughter of a warrior, she is expected to mate with a warrior and been given a decent training in combat, both hand-to-hand and with edged weapons, so as to strengthen such a union. After being taken prisoner by a Krath raiding party and being made a "Servant of God" bound for Strem Island, her ship is taken by Lemmaran pirates. She is then saved by Cord once the Marines and their Mardukan allies storm the ship she is on. As a result, she becomes indebted to Cord (becoming a Benan) much like Cord is indebted to Roger. She also finds herself attracted to Cord, despite the large age difference between them.

Pedi Agol Ropar Sheta Gastan is the Shin Lord of the Mudh Hemh and Pedi's father. While short by Mardukan standards he is also unusually broad and a fierce warrior. He is also a very pragmatic and crafty leader, who uses the war instigated by the humans' arrival at Kirsti to solidify his control over the other Shin tribes. As the war with the Krath breaks out, he loses his only son and heir Thertik and he finds himself in a serious problem when his daughter returns as Cord's benan, a problem that manages to resolve itself favorably in the end (though not without some complications).

Sor Teb is the head of the slave raiding forces of Kirsti. Known as "The Scourge", he is a highly dangerous, capable, cruel and fear-inspiring individual (O'Casey says he reminds her of Grath Chain "only competent"). Teb sees in the humans' arrival at Kirsti an opportunity to gain the necessary political power to ascend to the post of high-priest. However, he has no allies and is not well-thought of by the other members of the council and the military hierarchy and as a result, he relies heavily upon force and fear to achieve his ends.

Lorak Tral is the head of Kirsti's main field army. Known as "The Sere" his forces are not nearly as competent and battle-hardened Teb's slave raiders. However, unlike Teb, he enjoys the respect of the military hierarchy and the common Mardukans which has made him a leading contender for the position of high-priest and is bitterly opposed to Sor Teb's ascension to the High Priest's throne (the idea of a slave-raider as High Priest galls him). Once Teb's attempt to force the humans to hand over one of their numbers fails miserably, Tral sees an opportunity to subdue the Shin once and for all, and place himself upon the High Priest's throne in the process.

Werd Ras is the head of the Kirsti secret police. Known as "The Flail" he has eyes and ears everywhere throughout the satrapy but remains neutral in the power struggle between Teb and Tral who are vying for the position of the high-priest. However, has no respect for Teb on a personal level.

Harvard Mansul is an award-winning journalist of the Imperial Astrographic Society (the futuristic equivalent of National Geographic) who is rescued by the Marines when he is captured by the Krath while documenting the Shin for a piece on Marduk. Mansul is known to his peers as a reporter who likes to live on the edge, venturing into dangerous places and positions to seek the story, disappearing for months and years at a time, only to come back with great stories. Like everyone in the Empire, he believed Roger and his marines had died and is astonished to see him alive. He then takes to following him around and recording his doings as he sees it as the story of the century.

Ymyr Brown, Earl of Mountmarch is the Imperial Governor for Marduk. While a highly competent media manipulator, his competence does not extend beyond this single talent of his (though he believes it does). After getting caught up in a scandal in court that had ended up costing the lives of Imperial Navy servicemen and women, he earned the displeasure of the Empress who had him exiled to Marduk where he can do as little damage as possible. Mountmarch had sold himself out to the "Saints", the Empire's enemies, for money, long before his exile to Marduk and has a sick predilection towards young boys (a weakness exploited by the Saints when they sought to suborn him).

Colonel Fiorello Giovannuci is the commander of the Caravazan ("Saint") Special Operations insertion ship Emerald Dawn and a commando of the "Greenpeace Division". His ascension through the ranks was the result of his personal qualities.

Commander Amanda Beach is the executive officer of the Emerald Dawn. Unlike her Colonel Giovannuci, Beach is not a true believer in Saint religious doctrines as she is capable of seeing the great faults in her society and the hypocrisy of its leaders. As a result, she has not advanced through the ranks as Giovannuci has and feels little loyalty towards the system.

Captain T'Sool is the captain of the Ima Hooker, the ship carrying Prince Roger and most of his surviving marines across the ocean to the sub-continent where the spaceport is located.

Tob Kerr is master of the merchant vessel Rain Daughter who finds himself being chased by Lemmar Raiders and is fortunate enough to stumble upon the ships coming from K'Vaern's Cove. He is something of a risk-taker as he is willing to risk the unknown (at least, when the other options are known dangers).

Cred Cies is the captain of the Lemmaran ship Rage of Lemmar who is in pursuit of Rain Daughter when it happens upon the humans' convoy. While a capable and intelligent ship handler and sea fighter, he greatly underestimates the K'Vaernian vessels and their fighting capabilities, a mistake that ends up costing him dearly.

== Plot summary ==
The story opens in the restored city of Voitan, where a human search and rescue team (really an assassination squad) is examining the remains of the marines who were interred there after the battle against the Kranolta. Temu Jin, a Commo-Tech serving as translator for the team, repeatedly questions the local leaders as to the marines' purpose and fate, who in turn repeatedly state that all the marines died during the battle or shortly afterward. While Dara, the team's leader is content with their story, Jin remains privately suspicious because of several glaring clues that Dara, in his stupidity, has failed to notice. Between the physical evidence (pointing to people with marine nano-packs), the reticence of the king of Q'Nkok (who allowed only limited questioning and always while under supervision), the inconsistencies in T'Leen Targ's story (that the Kranolta took all the marines' weapons and gear), the Mardukans' atypical body-language of nods, open-mouthed smiles and handshakes (all indicating acculturation to humans) and the fact that the bodies were all stripped of clothing, jewelry and even tattoos (making their identification impossible without a DNA database), Jin becomes convinced that the locals are covering for the marines who are headed almost certainly, to the spaceport. As he's about to finish his scans, Jin notices a bronze earring with the word "BARBARIANS" on it. Deftly snatching it without Dara noticing, he then passes it on to T'Leen in a handshake, and tells him that he might want to melt it down "so nobody else finds it".

Upon the Western Ocean from K'Vaern's Cove, a flotilla of seven ships carries Prince Roger, his marine bodyguards and around 300 Diaspran riflemen and Vashin cavalrymen who have sworn their allegiance to him and the Empire of Man. The long voyage across the ocean towards the far sub-continent has given the troops time to wind down after the intense battle against the Boman, train upon their new gunpowder rifles and for Roger to mourn the loss of his valet and friend, Costas. However, the idyllic journey is violently disrupted by the sudden arrival of a giant sea creature which proceeds to bite off half a ship before being gunned down by a well-placed shot of Roger's, an extremely lucky shot from Sgt. Erkum Pol, several harpoon shots and many depth charges. The fish turns out to be a giant coll fish and its attack ends up costing them a whole ship, half its passengers and three marines and the troops gleefully feed most of it to the civan and Dogzard. To avoid similar attacks, Krindi Fain recommends mounting a cannon at the rear to fire at any other sea creatures that might show up and Pahner orders that all their radios be shut off to avoid detection as they are nearing the spaceport. He also orders the troops to begin practicing on entry tactics in preparation for their assault on the port, which they and Roger do together.

Shortly afterward, the flotilla spots a series of volcanic islands, and then, the sails of one ship being pursued by 6 other pirate ships. Roger and Pahner decide to risk contacting the ship under pursuit, despite their ignorance of what is going on, and Roger is sent across (against Pahner's better judgment) with Cord, Despreaux, Kosutic and Poertena. They make contact with the captain of Rain Daughter, Tob Kerr, who is initially taken aback by Roger's use of the "High Krath" language, used by the Fire Priests whom all fear but who permits them to come aboard. After managing to get a hold on the language, they are told that Rain Daughter was part of a Guard convoy from the mainland (called Krath) headed to the Island of Strem, but was jumped by Lemmaran raiders. Roger also tells Kerr their cover story of travelling across the ocean to the Krath to establish trade relations. Kerr advises them to head for Strem but Roger states they are headed for the mainland of Krath and contemptuously snorts at the possible risk the Lemmaran ships might pose to their flotilla. Returning to their ship, Roger and the command staff discuss the problem and, despite all the unknown variables, decide to engage the 6 pirate ships.

Pahner admits that he does not have any experience in a sea battle and turns effective command of the engagement over to Roger (though still keeping an eye on him), who orders five of their remaining six ships (the heaviest and least maneuverable is left behind to guard Rain Daughter) to engage the pirates by crossing between the pirates' six ships. The pirate commander, Cred Cies, while confident of his numerical advantage, is still suspicious about the ships that are so conveniently coming right at him. A sudden deluge conceals all of the ships from each other and when it clears the K'Vaernian ships, though scattered, are upwind of the pirates' formation and closing fast. Despite this, Cies is still confident that they can close in on them and rake their decks with swivel guns. This turns out to be a mistake as the K'Vaernian artillery mounted on the sides of the ships and are capable of far heavier broadsides then Cies guesses. The pirates manage to score a few shots on a single K'Vaernian ship, causing it to lose its foremast and then the K'Vaernians open fire. The massive roll of gunfire decimates the pirates while sharpshooters take out many of the Lemmaran gun grews on deck and the marines off-world weapons add to the carnage. The end result of the engagement is that one Lemmaran ship is sunk (thanks to a plasma cannon shot), three others get boarded and most of another single ship's crew dead and completely dismasted. Only Cred Cies' vessel manages to retain enough rigging to escape the initial engagement and Roger's ship closes with it so as to board it. Despite his immense losses, Cies still refuses to surrender and the Ima Hooker eventually closes upon it and launches a boarding action.

Krindi Fain's company leads the assault on the Lemmaran vessel and quickly manages to overwhelm them. However, Cord notices that the Lemmar are attempting to kill their helpless prisoners who are chained to the deck and leaps across to save them. Roger, astounded that his asi would abandon him at a time like this leaps onto the Lemmaran ship after him followed by Dogzard. Between the three of them, the surviving prisoners are protected from the Lemmar trying to kill them. Pahner, however, is furious that Roger broke his promise not to put himself out on a limb and boards the Lemmaran ship to castigate him while Denat does the same for Cord. Roger, after shouting down everybody yelling at him first demands that Cord explain why he jumped over in the first place. Cord explains that just as his life was saved by Roger, he is obligated to help others in need and that Roger should not have followed him at all to the pirate ship. Roger suddenly finds himself put upon by the irony of the situation while Pahner and the other commanders are hard pressed to laugh. Roger then proceeds to the cut the chains binding the prisoners when the first prisoner, a female who had killed two guards during the battle while being chained to the deck, tries to kick him when he pulls out his monomachete. She is stopped by Pahner and once Roger conveys his intentions to her in a hash of the local languages, she relents and allows him to free her and the other two surviving captives. It soon becomes apparent to Roger, that the female prisoner, who has been trained as a warrior, is also in charge of the other captives, two things that come as a surprise to him since they had rarely encountered any Mardukan societies where women enjoyed any status or had been warriors. She soon approaches Roger and Cord, to speak of "the Way of Honor, of the Way of the Warrior" and declares that she is now bonded to Cord as a benan for saving her life (much like Cord is bonded to Roger). Her statement leaves Cord seriously discomfited and perplexed (since only his people recognize such bonds).

Back aboard the Ima Hooker, O'Casey explains that there is a great deal in common between Pedi's people, the "Shin", and Cord's people, the X'Intai, as can be seen in many linguistic similarities between their two languages. She surmises that both peoples originated from the Krath sub-continent but that the X'Intai had somehow managed to travel eastward towards the large continent. O'Casey then states that it would be highly beneficial to recapture the other ships of the convoy and return them to the Krath, so as to get started on the right foot with the locals. Julian then proceeds to brief the command staff about Pedi's people and the local political conditions that might affect the marine's journey to the spaceport. O'Casey then elaborates upon the political conditions among the main polity, the Krath, and points out that is a highly regimented theocracy that is slavery based. Julian then points out that the reason the Shin and the Krath do not get along is that the Krath see the Shin a source for more slaves. Roger points out that since Cord is obligated to follow and protect Roger and Pedi is now obligated to follow and protect Cord, they need to find some way to conceal her Shin identity. They decide, that Pedi will be dressed as a Shadem female, who are always heavily clothed (with their faces covered as well)—a decision Pedi finds repulsive. The rest of the Mardukan troops will also have to be found clothes, since the cultures of the sub-continent have strong body modesty taboos, a concept Cord finds equally repulsive. They then decide on a battle plan to take the other prize ships. They flotilla then goes after each of the captured ships in turn, sending over a boat with Rastar, Roger (despite Pahner's extreme displeasure) and two others who under the pretense of wishing to trade goods, manage to surprise each crew and retake the ship. They then proceed to Kirsti, the main port of the sub-continent.

As they approach the enormous city of Kirsti, Roger and Pahner are both uneasy since they both realize they and their troops are seriously outnumbered by the locals who might be in contact with the spaceport. The latter concern is confirmed when they are met by a delegation from the local government, led unofficially by Sor Teb, who has encountered humans before, and who is greatly interested in the purpose of these new and unusual humans. The marines and their Mardukan troops are granted permission to enter Kirsti, though the locals impose many restrictions upon them and isolating them to a limited area of the docks. While the ships' captains begin seeking out local trade partners and resupplying their ships, the humans await the local leadership's decision on whether or not they can leave the city and continue their trek to the spaceport.

Julian, Portena and Denat go around about town, teaching the locals Canasta (it being a card game Portena inflicts on those he does not like), looking for supplies to purchase and gathering intelligence on local conditions. They report their findings along with O'Casey at a staff meeting held later and the situation is not good. Sor Teb, who was previously believed to be a minor functionary, turns out to be one of three members of the satrapy's military high council and the one most likely to succeed the dying high priest, and it becomes clear that they will not be permitted to leave Kirsti without his say-so. Pahner decides to try to recruit Teb and his slave raiding forces for the humans' objectives but should that not work out within a week, to prepare for a forceful exit. He orders Julian to prepare a battle plan on the local forces in and outside of the city and, upon hearing Portena's report on the high price of food in the markets, to find local storage facilities that could be raided for supplies. Roger is surprised by this and Pahner admits that the locals' passive hostility is making him nervous. Kosutic mentions her own concerns about something else: the Krath religion. The locals have been remarkably secretive about it and she wonders what exactly they are trying to hide. While Pahner feels they still have a week or two to sort things out, O'Casey mentions the possibility that the Krath might get word to the port sooner than that with teams of runners. Her concern turn out to be well founded (though she is not aware of it yet) since the Krath have sent word to the spaceport about the humans' presence. However, Temu Jin, after returning from the aborted "rescue mission", arranges things at the port so that he will receive any communiques from the Krath satraps to the Imperial Governor first and switches out the message about Roger's presence with a bogus message.

As the days go by for Roger and his company in Kirsti, Cord and Pedi finally manage to go shopping for weapons and other items Pedi requires. Cord discovers that those other are clothes and cosmetics which make Pedi look entirely too attractive. After a training session with Pedi, Cord senses certain "parts" of him surging and he fears the coming of his biannual "season". Denat also grows increasingly ill-tempered (for the same reason), causing Portena and Julian to be concerned about his strange behavior. Things begin to change when the local volcano erupts and the entire city suddenly shuts down as the priesthood sees the eruption as a bad omen. The humans suddenly receive a message from the High Priest indicating that he's willing to meet with Roger. Along with O'Casey, Pahner orders that Roger be accompanied by Kostutic, Despreaux, a fire team from her squad (who are all to be armed with bead rifles) plus a squad of Mardukan infantry and cavalry. He decides that they be ready to leave at a moment's notice and schedules an inspection to coincide with the time of the audience.

Roger meets the High Priest, who is accompanied by Sor Teb and many guards at the High Temple of Kirsti, located near the city walls. He presents himself as Seran Chang, Baron of Washinghome (one of his minor titles) to the aged High Priest and asks about their petition to travel to the spaceport. The High Priest, however, wishes to speak about a far more important "needs of the God" and states that the humans have "avoided Service to the Fire Lord" for too long. Roger infers that the Krath are requiring a "Servant of God" from among the humans and begins to consult with the others. While Roger and the other humans are willing to leave a volunteer behind (provided that they be treated properly) Pedi is emphatically against it but her explanation as to why is lost upon them. They conclude that there must be a problem with their translation of Krath language and request a recess to discuss the matter with their colleagues but Sor Teb politely refuses, stating that the Servant must be gathered now. His response causes the entire human company to tense and Roger decides to dump the translation of Krath from his "toot", loads Cord's language as a baseline and orders Pedi to speak in Shin. It soon becomes clear that a "Servant of God" is really a sacrifice to the God, who will then be eaten by the body of the Fire God's worshippers. Sor Teb confirms this, and when Roger asks to decline this invitation, Teb points out that he has more guards than he does and that they can either choose to hand over a single human sacrifice or that all of them will be sacrificed as he intends to make sure all Krath know that it was he who finally brought the humans to the God. It is then that Roger and company open fire on the guards and Pedi immediately tosses off her robes and goes for the High Priest whom she decapitates. Unfortunately, Sor Teb manages to escape the carnage. Roger and Kosutic risk a com signal to Pahner and notify him quickly about what transpired with Roger ordering him to make for the gates (which is where they are headed to as well). After killing the few Krath guards who attempt to storm the camp at the docks and ordering the ships to head back to K'Vaern's Cove, Pahner orders the troops to head for the gates.

Outside of the spaceport, Temu Jin meets with a Shin chieftain with whom he's been in contact and tells him about the humans who arrived at Kirsti. While the chieftain is somewhat reluctant to assist him any further because of mounting pressure from his tribe's warriors, he is intrigued when Jin mentions that some of the humans are marines and agrees to help. Back in Kirsti, Roger and his guards manage to shake off any pursuit by the Krath guards and end up in the nave of the temple where they witness the horrific site of "Servants" being dragged to an altar and then killed and butchered by richly-clad priests while the upper-class of Kirsti chant in the background. The guard in the nave notice and begin to advance and Roger orders a single volley and then cold steel. After dispatching the guards, the priests and a handful of brave worshippers, Roger allows for 3 minutes of looting and then orders the troops to move out. In the streets, Pahner and the troops manage to reach the city gates but find that they were closed ahead of time. Roger and his guards continue to fight their way towards the gates, incurring serious casualties in the process, including Cord who is seriously wounded when he interposes himself between Roger and a spear that had been thrown at him. They eventually manage to make it to the gatehouse and take out its armaments, allowing the Vasin and Portena to storm the gatehouse. Portena places a satchel charge blowing the doors for the gatehouse allowing the Vasin in, find the gate room, raise the gate and jam the controls. Roger and company then exit the city and manage to disengage from the Krath guards pressing upon them by dumping the oil in the gatehouse into the passage and then throwing a couple of white phosphorus grenades that sets the Krath guards aflame and much of the temple district on fire. The humans and their allies then head for the hills.

In Kirsti, Sor Teb finds himself in the proverbial doghouse when his colleagues on the military high council, Werd Ras and Lorak Tral, chastise him for his idiocy in endangering the High Priest, doing so with too few guards and then abandoning him to be killed by a Shin. Teb is informed that a quorum of the full council has granted plenipotentiary authority to Lorak to bring the humans to ground and, if necessary, the Shin as well, should they decide to aid them. Sor is skeptical about Lorak's forces being able to contend with the Shin (as they haven't had much luck in the past) but Lorak is confident because he intends to guard his line of supply, something that wasn't done in previous punitive expeditions. Werd supports Lorak's plan, particularly in light of the evidence that nothing short of a prepared assault will be enough to contend with the humans. Sor is then told that with the exception of a few Scourge personnel who will serve as guides for the army, he and his forces are confined to their barracks. Meanwhile, Roger and Pahner, after discussing the matter with Pedi, decide to take the Shesul Pass towards Pedi's hometown of Mudh Hemh, rather than the easier path through the Valley of the Krath, which would entail dealing with two fortifications. They also receive Dobrescu's report of the casualties: most of the injured have either expired or else will survive, with Cord by far, the most heavily wounded and who is still not out of the woods.

The convoy first arrives at the town of Srem, where Rastar subtly threatens the mayor into resupplying them and providing them with some intel on the Shesul Pass. They then head into the pass, where the climb becomes impossible with all the carts they're carrying, and they are forced to double up the turom on every cart and abandon half their supplies midway. Scouting parties of Vasin manage to reach the curtain wall that Pedi told them about and discover a very large fortress. They set up a hidden camp in front of the fortress and await the rest of convoy and report the difficulty of taking such a fortress, but Roger has a plan. He sends Julian, Gronningen and Macek to approach the fortress from the adjacent mountain ledge. They are surprised when they encounter no resistance upon the walls and proceed cautiously into the fortress. They are even more surprised when they find all the Krath guardsmen huddled around a fire in the semi-hibernation torpidity that extreme cold induces in their species. After tying up the sleeping guards, they open the gates for the rest of their party and Pahner decrees two days to recuperate, as the company is on its last legs. However, Julian finds an imperial Zuiko tri-cam in the Krath commander's office, indicating that the fortress has had contact with the port and then Gronningen finds a human locked up in one of the cells in the fortress.

The human, Harvard Mansul, turns out to be a member of the Imperial Astrographic Society and he astonished to see Roger and his marines alive at all and tells Roger and the marines about his circumstances. He had come to Marduk to write a story about the locals but his arrival at the spaceport was not viewed kindly by the governor who took him for an imperial spy and started to worry about getting killed in some "accident". It was then that he was contacted by someone in the port who offered to smuggle him out and into a small enclave of humans under the protection of a Shin warlord called Pedi Gastan, which the marines immediately identify as Pedi's father (making them wonder why Pedi had never seen humans before). Mansul also tells them that he was smuggled out through gaps in the security perimeter, a point that the marines find very interesting. It is then that Portena arrives and tells them that he needs Doc Dobrescu because something is very wrong Denat who seems to be going crazy. When Dobrescu arrives, Denat eventually gets him to open up and he explains that he is "in season", a point that is then relayed to a bemused Pahner and Roger. When Pahner wonders about the rest of the Mardukan troops Dobrescu explains that being from different regions, those Mardukans will have different "seasons". But Roger then realizes that Cord is also from Denat's region, which Dobrescu believes is the reason for the strange readings he's been getting from him. Unbeknownst to them, Pedi recognizes the signs of the Season in Cord while tending to his wounds and decides to alleviate the strain on his body by mating with him.

The marines depart the fort and head for Pedi's home at Mudh Hemm, where they see the Krath present in strength and the Shin gathering for battle. They are brought before the Gastan, Pedi's crafty father, who is none too pleased to hear his daughter as a benan or see the humans after the events in Kirsti. Though initially hostile towards them because of the loss of his only son Thertik along with 400 of his warriors and telling his daughter that she has fallen into the company of ragged mercenaries and thieves, he quickly changes his tone when Roger abandons his pretense and tells him who he truly is and relies to him what the Krath had demanded of him in Kirsti. He takes the head of the dead High Priest of Kirsti from his daughter, climbs to the walls of the citadel and mounts it on a pike, telling the Krath arrayed outside the fort his "answer" to their demand of the humans by spitting on the High Priest's head. He then tells Roger and Pahner that his daughter's allies are now his but that he expects them to help him out of "this mess".

The Gastan reveals to Roger and Company that he has been in contact with an undercover IBI agent at the port and tells them what they already guessed, that the governor has "sold his soul" to the Saints who are frequently in the system. The governor has allied himself with the Krath and has already assisted the Son of the Fire near the spaceport. Since it is only a matter of time before he will assist the Krath in destroying the Shin, the Gaston has chosen to assist Temu Jin by helping Roger, in the slim hope of defeating the governor. Roger states that once the governors are brought to the Empire's attention, they would have to intervene to stop him. He also pledges upon the honor of his house to end the Krath depredations. But the Gastan then drops a "bombshell" on Roger and his Marines: there was a coup attempt against his mother. While his mother survived the attempt, his brother John and John's children did not and his sister Alexandra was killed when her ship was destroyed in an ambush. The Gastan also reveals that the Empress has laid the blame for the attempt against the throne on none other than her youngest son, Roger.

Roger and the marine command group meet privately to discuss these dire developments. With so many of the Empress' loyalists in the fleet and IBI dead (along with the entire Empress' Own, save the few who are with Roger) and replaced with individuals whose loyalty is far more questionable coupled with the fact that the Empress has been seen in public accompanied by Prince Jackson Adoula and Roger's father the Earl of New Madrid, it seems obvious that all is not well in the empire. Julian concludes that the "coup attempt" actually succeeded and that the Empress is now under the control of Prince Jackson, and that Roger's father and General Gianetto, the new High Commander for Fleet Forces (and a long acquaintance of Pahner's) are in on it. But it is also clear that the conspirators' control over the empire is not complete, as at least one sensitive position in Home Fleet has been filled by a person whose loyalty to the Empress is unquestionable. What's more, there's no way the conspirators can continue to control the Empress indefinitely without being discovered and Roger and Pahner conclude that the conspirators have a legitimate heir gestating in a uterine replicator. Once the child is born and confirmed to be of the Empress' own genetics, she'll be killed and Jackson will we named regent for the child, placing him in de facto control of the empire. As the coup occurred two months before, they only have seven more months to attempt a rescue of the Empress and only after dealing with their own immediate problems.

As Roger and his troops contemplate various ways to defeat the Krath (with Mansul avidly recording every meeting) and Cord recovers from his wounds, Julian and O'Casey go over the intelligence provided by Temu Jin. It soon becomes clear that the defenses of the spaceport have been severely compromised and Julian is unsure whether the governor is a "complete and total idiot—or else subtly brilliant". But when he mentions that his name is Ymyr Brown, the Earl of Mountmarch, O'Casey can barely contain her laughter as she explains the depth of his incompetence and how he probably ended up on Marduk. Taking the port is deemed to be a "cakewalk" but what the marines can do afterward is far more problematic, as it seems obvious that the conspirators have managed to convince the public that what they're saying is true while anyone claiming that the Empress is being controlled is obviously a crank who believes in conspiracy theories.

Roger's troops launch a number of spoiler raids in an attempt to break the Krath's will to fight but are unsuccessful due to the Krath army's sheer size. Roger's commanders and the Gastan lean towards a prolonged battle of attrition to break the Krath's will to fight but Roger says they need a decisive battle. As he contemplates the Shin Valley's geology, he's struck with a moment of inspiration on how to defeat the Krath outright and humiliate them in the process. In a command conference held that night in the Gastan's primary bathhouse, Roger explains that the Valley of the Shin had once been blocked at one end, creating a lake at the valley's end. Roger proposes to use heavy explosives from the spaceport (to be acquired by Temu Jin) to blow off a large chunk of the adjacent mountain and dam up the valley, recreating the lake that used to be right where the Krath army is camped out. The rising waters will force them out into the open and surrender or remain up to their groins in cold water. The Shin chieftains agree to the plan. After the conference ends, Roger and his people, along with the Gastan, remain in the bathhouse to discuss their concerns over the war. The Gastan fears that with so many warriors killed, the Shin population will decline severely (for the same reasons the Kranolta were on the decline). Krindi suggests co-opting the Krath to move to the Shin Valley to solve this problem and to require them to renounce Mardukan sacrifice. Kosutic is perplexed over this since Mansul noted that the sacrifices had to be a recent change in the theology and the humans reason out that it is the result of deliberate cultural contamination by the Saint presence. Roger and Despreaux are eventually left alone in the hot tub and have a discussion about their relationship. Despreaux, having seen too much intense combat on Marduk, feels that she can't continue with Roger. There's a big fight looming on the horizon to save the Empress and Despreaux has seen too much death already. Even if their successful, Roger will become emperor now that he is his mother's only remaining child, and Despreaux doesn't want to be Empress, or worse, relegated to a royal concubine because of dynastic calculations. Roger tries to plead with her stay with him but she only agrees to stay on until they reach Earth and rescue his mother and that they'll discuss the matter then.

Temu Jin comes through on the high yield explosives the marines ask for, along with some additional ammunition and spare parts for their off-world weaponry. Despreaux, along with Julian and his team, set up the charges and return to Mudh Hemh. The Krath however, do not remain idle at seeing the humans up to something on the mountainside and launch another large scale attack on Nopet Nujam. They begin a full-court press just as the charges are detonated and, as predicted, the river begins to rise rapidly, flooding the Krath encampment. However, just as the Krath begin to get off the walls of Nopet Nujam, a second attack by Krath and Shadem raiders, led by Sor Teb, attacks Mudh Hemh. Roger, in full battle armor and armed with a bead cannon, goes out to "remonstrate" with Teb and point out the foolishness of the attack. Teb, aware of Roger's true identity, is unfazed by Roger's threats, as his position in Kirsti has become untenable. He simply intended to kill as many Shin in Mudh Hemh as he can and escape to the Shadem. He then surprises Roger with a "one-shot" (an off-world, anti-armor weapon, designed to kill the person inside it by a ricocheting scab) which he throws at Roger. The Scourge raiding party then storms the battlements and Teb himself fights against an enraged Pedi. Teb succeeds in injuring Pedi's shoulder who then drops to one knee and impales Teb on two of her swords while Dogzard finishes him off by ripping his throat out. Fearing for Pedi's life, Cord professes his feelings for Pedi and begs her to hold on for him until Dobrescu can arrive while Pedi admits that she is pregnant with his children and feels the same way about him. Roger is found to be alive, having managed to turn just enough so that the one-shot failed to lock onto his armor properly, with only a few broken ribs and bruises to show for it. Pahner personally brings him up to speed both about the Krath surrender and the situation between Cord and Pedi (much to Roger's gleeful delight).

With Temu Jin's information and assistance on the inside, Roger, his marines, his Mardukan retainers and 2000 Shin warriors manage to storm and take control of the spaceport with few casualties and Pahner personally (and with immense satisfaction) locates Governor Mountmarch (who's found with a naked 10-year-old boy in his quarters) and places him under arrest for treason and pedophilia. Roger and his marines then begin preparations for seizing a ship. All the marines trade in all their chameleon suits for newer (and less torn up) suits and replace all of their weapon from the port armory (Portena forcing them all to first clean out all their old weapons). Julian and Kosutic begin fitting out the Basik's Own with their own chameleon suits and weapons (even though it is agreed that they and Roger will only be used to back up the marines and only if there's no other choice) while O'Casey takes, Mansul, Denat, Cord, Pedi and a squad of marines and Mardukans on a shuttle trip to backtrace their trek across the planet, visiting every place they had been to assess the impact the marines visit had on the population and to cover up any evidence they may have left behind. Denat is left in Marshad while Cord is taken back to his village where he introduces his soon-to-be wife to his family. They then reach their long abandoned shuttles and, having refueled them, fly back to the port, picking up Denat along the way with T'Leen Sena who has accepted his marriage proposal. In the meantime, Temu Jin assists the marines in gaining access to Mountmarch's private files where they discover a wealth of evidence against him, indicating his treason began long before his exile to Marduk. The Mardukans practice with their new weapons and are given a brief course in shipboard combat as they await the arrival of a ship they can safely commandeer. Once such a ship arrives, Pahner orders all weapons-training to cease to avoid detection and to get their "war faces" on. As they await the ship's entry into orbit Roger arranges a huge banquet for the troops, complete with various "awards" being handed to every member of his party (such as a silver pitchfork for Kosutic, a set of four bronzed bead-pistols for Raster and "little pocking wrench" for Portena) and gives Pahner the Order of the Bronze Shield while Pahner, in turn, gives Roger the Combat Infantryman's Badge for having "walked into the fire again and again, and come out not unscathed, but at least, thank God, alive". As the dinner winds down, Despreaux propositions Roger again but he turns her down because she still won't marry him.

As the Emerald Dawn enters into orbit, Temu Jin asks to conduct a customs inspection as a cover for the shuttle carrying the marines but the ship captain is suspicious since this is the first time such an inspection is conducted (despite Temu Jin's assurances that it is because of an upcoming inspection on them). He sends Commander Amanda Beach and two highly dangerous crewmen to greet Temu Jin at the airlock. As Temu Jin meets with Beach and her goons he drops to the ground as the Marines blast through the airlock behind him, but it becomes clear that the battle plan is a bust almost immediately as Beach and one of her guards manage to escape the marines initial attack with the ship's crew resisting far more forcefully than the crew of any tramp freighter. The marines begin to sustain fatalities as the crew counterattacks with plasma rifles while Jin's hacking of the ship's computers reveals, to everyone's horror, that they are aboard a Saint special ops insertion ship and are up against a full company of highly dangerous commandos, commanded by the infamous Colonel Fiorello Giovannuci, a real Saint fanatic. Pahner is forced to call in Roger and the Mardukans to get his marines out, while the Saint-John twins disable the ship's anti-ship defenses (at the cost of John's life). Roger (having identified himself to the ship in his demand that they surrender), Mansul, the navy pilots and the Mardukans arrive and begin spreading throughout the ship, causing serious damage to it in the process (the Mardukans, not being accustomed to shipboard combat, use far more firepower than necessary). The reinforcements turn the tide in the marines' favor and Giovannuci decides to activate the ship's self-destruct rather than surrender and demands over the internal comm that they withdraw immediately. Realizing that he's serious and that they have no way to deactivate the self-destruct without the cooperation of at least one of the ship's command staff, Pahner immediately orders a withdrawal. Portena then reports that he has Amanda Beach, the ship's executive officer, who does have the override codes for the self-destruct but who demands asylum from Roger who can grant it upon the Imperial family's honor. With his identity revealed and too few marines remaining, Roger agrees and manages to reach the bridge and breach its defenses. There he and Pahner find Giovannuci, the senior NCO, and several other bridge personnel who refuse to surrender and deactivate the self-destruct. Roger orders Beach be brought there and tells Giovannuci that they have his exec who is willing to cooperate. Giovannuci and the senior NCO then pull out from the back of their uniforms one-shots and hurl them at Roger who manages to kill the senior NCO and stop the one-shot he throws from activating but fails to stop the one Giovannuci uses. Pahner however, manages to shove him aside and place himself between Roger and the second one-shot, which manages to lock on and activate properly on Pahner's armor, critically wounding him. Roger furiously orders Giovanucci and everybody else removed from the bridge then goes to one knee next to the dying Pahner, swearing that he'll get the mission done and save his mother and bidding his chief bodyguard and father figure farewell as Pahner finally dies.

The story concludes with Roger explaining to the Beach their predicament as he is now a wanted traitor, a situation she has no choice but to accept. He also asks Nimashet to stay with them at least until they rescue his mother. She agrees, but she still refuses to marry him.
