= Gust Front (novel) =

2001 book by John Ringo

- Paperback cover
- Author: John Ringo
- Language: English
- Series: Legacy of the Aldenata
- Genre: Military science fiction
- Publisher: Baen Books
- Publication date: 2001
- Publication place: United States
- Media type: Hardcover & paperback
- Pages: 736 pp
- ISBN: 978-0-7434-3525-3
- Preceded by: A Hymn Before Battle (2000)
- Followed by: When the Devil Dances (2002)

Gust Front is the second book in John Ringo's Legacy of the Aldenata series.

== Synopsis ==
In this series, an alliance of multiple alien species, has enlisted the aid of the warlike but technologically backward humans, to halt the galactic advance of the Posleen, a race of centaur-shaped aliens who live only for battle, consuming their own and their enemies' dead and stripping conquered planets of resources.

Gust Front follows a series of characters as they prepare for the looming Posleen invasion of Earth. The main protagonist is Captain Michael O'Neal, Medal of Honor recipient and hero of the battle against the Posleen on Diess. Other major characters include O'Neal's father, "Papa" O'Neal, and his daughter, Cally O'Neal, as well as various military personnel and civilians who are affected by the invasion.

=== Plot ===
The story begins with O'Neal and various military and civilian personnel taking steps to prepare for the looming Posleen invasion. O'Neal is tasked by the commander of the U.S. defenses with training a battalion of Armored Combat Suits, the most technologically advanced units in Earth's possession. Other military personnel, including military leaders, combat engineers, and local space defense forces, are also in the midst of preparations for the imminent invasion. The story also includes glimpses of how the Posleen, even before their landing, have already changed civilian human society. In addition, it becomes clear that there are ongoing plots within the Federation as multiple alien and human factions jockey for power and control of resources.

A relatively small Posleen invasion force arrives earlier than expected, throwing human preparations into disarray. The landings occur in central Africa, western Asia, southeastern Asia, and the eastern United States. The battles in Asia are shown briefly in character point-of-views, but Africa is only mentioned in passing. The major focus of the novel is the battle in the mid-Atlantic United States. Initially the Posleen focus their assault on Fredericksburg, VA, where combat engineers and local militia construct a series of traps to slow the aliens' advance and cause as many casualties as possible. After overcoming the defenders in Fredericksburg, VA, the Posleen forces in the U.S. split, with some forces heading north toward Washington, D.C., and others heading south to Richmond, VA. The President of the U.S. overrides his military advisers and orders the United States' 9th and 10th Army Corps to cross the Potomac river and engage the Posleen in northern Virginia. This maneuver goes against established military doctrine for fighting the Posleen and results in the almost complete destruction of the 9th Army Corps and the rout of the 10th Army Corps, both of which retreat north toward Washington, D.C., and the relative safety of the Potomac river.

Meanwhile, combat engineers prepare Shockoe Bottom in Richmond, VA, as a deathtrap, luring the Posleen forces into a kill-zone in the city. The Posleen forces take the bait and the southern portion of their invasion force is almost completely destroyed in battle in Richmond.

During the battles, it becomes clear that an outside force, not human or Posleen, has been interfering with human preparations for battle against the Posleen. A clandestine group of humans, Indowy, and Himmit, called Bane Sidhe, whose mission is to subvert Darhel control of the Galactic Federation, send a group of specially trained monks to protect "Papa" and Cally O'Neal from a would-be assassin. Throughout the story it is hinted that the Darhel are not as benevolent as they seem and their purposes may be at odds with the humans'.

After a series of desperate rearguard actions, the last units of the 9th and 10th Army Corps retreat across the Potomac river into Washington, D.C. However, the Posleen are able to secure a bridge across the river before it can be destroyed, and their capture of the city is only prevented by the timely arrival of Captain O'Neal's Armored Combat Suit battalion and a brave stand at the Washington Monument by rejuvenated Medal of Honor recipients and the remainder of the 9th and 10th Army Corps. The President of the U.S. is caught by a Posleen lander near the end of the fighting and is killed attempting to protect refugees. Captain O'Neal and his allies in the military leadership are vindicated in the aftermath of the battle as it becomes clear that the incompetence of several military leaders led to the disastrous rout in northern Virginia.
