= March Upcountry =

2001 novel by David Weber

- First edition
- Author: David Weber & John Ringo
- Illustrator: John Ringo (maps)
- Cover artist: Patrick Turner
- Language: English
- Series: Empire of Man\Roger MacClintock series
- Genre: Science fiction
- Publisher: Baen Books
- Publication date: May 2001
- Publication place: United States
- Media type: Print (Paperback) & E-book
- Pages: 586
- ISBN: 0-671-31985-X
- OCLC: 45284650
- Dewey Decimal: 813/.54 21
- LC Class: PS3573.E217 M37 2001
- Followed by: March to the Sea

March Upcountry is the first novel in the science fiction series of the Empire of Man by David Weber and John Ringo. It tells the story of Prince Roger MacClintock and his bodyguards of the Empress' Own Regiment who get marooned on the alien planet of Marduk due to an act of sabotage on their ship and must fight their way towards the local space port (held by enemies of the Terran Empire) in order to get back home to Earth. The book appeared on the New York Times Best Seller list.

== Characters ==
- Prince Roger MacClintock is the youngest child of Empress Alexandra VII, ruler of the Empire of Man, from her second consort Lazar Fillipo, the Earl of New Madrid. A handsome and tall 22-year-old, Roger is poorly regarded by almost everyone except his valet, Kostas Matsugae.
- Captain Armand Pahner is the commander of Bravo Company, Bronze Battalion of the Empress's Own Regiment, the elite bodyguards who protect the royal family.
- D'nall Cord is a Shaman in his tribe, the X'Intai, the first society Roger and his marines encounter on Marduk.
- D'nall Denat is one of Cord's nephews.
- Eleonora O'Casey is Roger's chief of staff and former tutor, who holds multiple doctorates in sociology, political sciences and human history.
- Kostas Matsugae is Roger's valet and manservant who becomes the company's caravan chief.
- Eva Kosutic is the senior NCO in Bravo Company and an extremely competent and experienced combat veteran. A native of the planet Armagh, Kosutic is an Armagh-Satanist High Priestess.
- Julio Poertena is the armorer for Bravo Company, a native of the planet Pinopa from a non-English speaking household.
- Adib Julian is one of the senior NCOs in the company and the former company armorer.
- Nimashet Despreaux is a squad commander in Bravo company. She is beautiful and vulnerable yet also tough and very dangerous.
- Warrant Officer Mike "Doc" Dobresceau is one of the shuttle pilots who land the company on Marduk.
- Mark & John St. John are identical twins who serve in Bravo Company, with John being the hard-working, smart and capable NCO and Mark being the fighter.
- Empress Alexandra VII is the ruler of the Empire of Man and Roger's mother. Their relationship is strained due to Roger's similarity in appearance and behaviour to his hated father.
- Xiya Kan is king of the city-state Q'Nkok, the first city the Marines visit on Marduk. King Xyia is a moderate ruler who is forced to contend with an endless number of plots directed against him.
- T'Leen Targ is a Voitanese veteran of the Kranolta wars and a weapons dealer in Q'Nkok.
- Radj Hoomas is king of the city-state of Marshad, and an extremely ambitious and devious individual.
- Kheder Bijan is the head of the Marshad secret police and a self-proclaimed "tinker".
- T'Leen Sena is a female "intelligence operative" in Marshad.
- Dogzard is a pet Roger picks up at Cord's village.
- Patty is one of the flar-ta pack animals the company employs, which Roger uses as a war steed. Roger gives her this human name since she reminds him of a "Patricia" he once knew in boarding school.

== Plot summary ==
Prince Roger is ordered by his mother and older half-brother to attend a ceremony in Leviathan. Roger travels on the spaceship Charles DeGlopper with Eleanora O'Casey, Kostas Matsugae, and Captain Vil Krasnitsky. During the trip, a sentry is discovered shot dead on the ship, and Sergeant-Major Eva Kosutic then discovers charges in the main plasma conduits. Kosutic catches the ship's logistics officer, Ensign Guha, and shoots her just before the charges are detonated. As a result, the ship is forced to land in the nearest star system, Marduk.

Prince Roger and his body guards escape in shuttles hoping to land on the planet and capture the space port. The shuttles eventually land further from the port than planned and Bravo Company sets out on their long journey. The company reach a jungle and D'Nall Cord, a shaman of the X'Intai people, suddenly appears from the jungle. He decides to introduce them to his tribe. While in the village, Cord and Delkra (the tribal chief) consult with Roger, Pahner and O'Casey on a serious problem facing the tribe from the city-state of Q'Nkok. The city and the X'Intai have a treaty whereby the city dwellers are permitted to cut only certain trees in a specific area of the tribe's territory. In recent months the woodcutters have been cutting deeper into the jungle than permitted. To attack the woodcutters would create war. The tribe could launch a surprise attack on Q'Nkok and feast on their food stores, but Pahner requests that they delay attacking Q'Nkok until after the company has gone there.

The company proceeds to Q'Nkok. They are brought before the King Xiya Kan and state their need for supplies in exchange for hi-tech tools. The company arrange to eavesdrop on the king's council and hear him attack them for their continued misconduct. The company bugs all the great houses to discover who is involved and the marines discover that three of the great houses are conspiring to topple the king. The marines and the king's guards assault the Great Houses' homes and afterwards the company and the marines set forth into Kranolta territory. As Kranolta hunters ambush the company repeatedly, Sergeant Cobedra is killed. Meanwhile, the Kranolta assemble all of their tribes and decide to attack the human invaders. They strike and the company is forced to try to get to the walls of the city.

The next day, the Kranolta approach the Citadel. Suddenly, a new force emerges from the jungle which assault the Kranolta's remaining forces. The reduced company depart from Voitan and continue to march until they reach Marshad. They arrive at the king's palace. Later, Lt. Jasco, Kosutic, Julian, Poertena and Denat meet in the kitchen and witness a wall opening up to reveal Kheder Bijan. Kheder tells the humans that King Radj will have to send his entire army to destroy them. Kheder says that there are factions in Marshad in league with Pasule. All the marines need to do is to attack the army. On the morning of the battle, the marines set off to the battle field. The plasma cannon is hauled to the top of a hill and the bridge explodes and breaks. Three days after the battle, Roger meets with Kheder Bijan, who is the new king of Marshad and inquires as to the delay in giving them the supplies and shields that were promised. However, after getting in a conflict with Kheder, Roger shoots him.

T'Leen establishes a more rational regime, redistributing the land and dedicating more of it to food production. Roger then mounts the flar-ta Patty and gives to order to continue the march towards the mountains.

== Reception ==
The book was reviewed for the Polish fanzine Esensja by Grzegorz Wiśniewski.
