= March to the Sea (novel) =

2001 novel by David Weber and John Ringo

- First edition
- Author: David Weber & John Ringo
- Illustrator: John Ringo (maps)
- Cover artist: Patrick Turner
- Language: English
- Series: Empire of Man\Roger MacClintock series
- Genre: Science fiction
- Publisher: Baen Books
- Publication date: Aug 2001
- Publication place: United States
- Media type: Print (Paperback) & E-book
- Pages: 631
- ISBN: 0-7434-3580-X
- OCLC: 50822888
- Preceded by: March Upcountry
- Followed by: March to the Stars

March to the Sea is the second novel in the science fiction series of the Empire of Man by David Weber and John Ringo. It tells the story of Prince Roger MacClintock and his remaining bodyguards of the Empress' Own Regiment who get marooned on the alien planet of Marduk due to an act of sabotage on their ship, and must continue fighting their way towards the planetary space port in order to get back home to Earth. The book appeared on the New York Times best seller list.

== New Characters Introduced ==
Rastar Komas Ta'Norton is the last Prince of the fallen Vasin city of Therdan. A civan rider and pistoleer, Rastar is one of those rare Mardukans who are quad-dextrous and can accurately fire 4 pistols simultaneously even under the most intensive combat condition (and the same applies for his use of swords). After the Boman began besieging the city Therdan, his uncle, the king of Therdan, had led a suicidal charge of civan to clear a path though the Boman for Rastar and his guards to get the woman and children out of the city. Rastar burns with a desire to avenge the destruction of his homeland yet is not without reason. He and his troops strike up a very close working and personal relationship with Roger and the marines (though their first encounter is less than amicable) and learn a great deal from them throughout their journeys together while he in turn serves as their guide for the new region the marines pass through.

Honal C'Thon Radas is a noble of the Vasin city-state of Sheffan (which was also destroyed by the Boman hordes) and a cousin of Rastar. Characterized by the humans as a "hot spur", Honal is an extremely fierce warrior who often takes insane chances in combat situations to achieve victory. But while he might be a bit crazy he is by no means stupid and possesses an intense love of riding fast animals and longs to try out an even faster human vehicle. His hatred for the Boman and his desire to avenge the destruction of his homeland is even greater than his cousin's which leads him to mercilessly pursue the Boman to their destruction whenever the opportunity arises. Like his cousin, he forms a close relationship with the humans and takes a liking to human jokes (humor rarely translating well across different species).

High-Priest Gratar is the priest-king of the city-state of Diaspra. Considered by most to be a fairly decent king and the equivalent of a saint in the eyes of the people of Diaspra, Gratar is devout in his belief and faith in the God of Water, which the city worships, and seeks to please his God by creating great works for Him, so as to prevent his wrath. His devotion, however, has caused him to overlook the growing discontent of members of his council who feel the city has remained stagnant for too long and who eventually conspire against him. Despite this inattention, he is a crafty and capable ruler (to a degree) who is willing to embrace uncomfortable and controversial policies when he knows there is little choice.

Bishop Rus From is the Bishop of Artificers and one of the most senior members of the council and an old friend of Gratar. A highly talented, proficient, innovative and intelligent individual (Kosutic equates him to Leonardo da Vinci), From feels the stagnation of Diaspra worse than anyone else as he's forced to deal day after day with the unchallenging tasks of designing the works of the God of Water and "pumps, pumps and more pumps". He becomes the leader of a conspiracy directed against Gratar and seeks the humans' assistance in doing this. For his actions, he is exiled from Diaspra and joins the marines in their journey to K'Vaern's Cove, there he becomes the K'Vaernian Army's chief combat engineer and assists in the design and production of the weapons and devices the humans introduce.

General Bogess is the commander of the Diaspran Army, The Guard of God. One of two water-priests on the city council, Bogess is a highly competent soldier and commander with a dour disposition and a large degree of cynicism. He is one of several members of the ruling council who feel Diaspra is stagnating and who have decided to try and do something about it. Like Rus From, he is forced to leave the city along with the relief force after the Battle of Diaspra to the city of K'Vaern's Cove where his experience in that battle serves him well in training the K'Vaernians for an even greater battle ahead.

Grath Chain is a council member in Diaspra representing certain merchant interests. While manipulative and conniving, Grath is rather inept and incompetent blowing the lid on the conspiracy in the hopes of currying favor with Gratar only to find that Gratar is not blind to his true nature or receptive to his council. During the waiting period before the battle, Grath lobbies for appeasement of the Boman which seriously undermines the marines efforts to get Gratar and the other council member to stand and fight.

Krindi Fain is a Diaspran Laborer of God pressed into military service as a result of the Boman invasion. While initially reluctant to become a soldier (which he and his fellows are forced to do), Fain discovers he is a very good soldier and an even better commander. He distinguishes himself during the Battle of Diaspra, managing to remain calm and in control of his squad of pikemen in the face of thousands of screaming barbarians and later excels in the Battle of Sindi and in the prior skirmishing engagements. He eventually becomes an officer and along with his company, joins the humans in their journey across the sea and into the unknown, swearing allegiance to Prince Roger and the Empire of Man. He forges a close friendship with Sergeant Julian who comments that he has bitten by the "command bug".

Erkum Pol is Krindi Fain's company sergeant. An enormous Mardukan even by his race's standard, Erkum is not overburdened with intelligence (to put it mildly), with limited verbal skills (which he rarely employs) and tends to see things rather simplistically. While an extremely poor marksman (though he refuses to acknowledge this failing) he often displays an uncanny ability to react quickly and effectively in moments of crisis (the humans saying that he's good with his hands). He is also utterly loyal to Krindi Fain whom he constantly shadows (and overshadows) and whose back he always watches.

General Bistem Kar is the General of the Guard of K'Vaern's Cove. Known as "The Kren" (a large water beast) both for his immense size (Roger believes he could bench-press a flar-ta) as well as his speed and cunning, Kar is one of the most competent Mardukan officers the marines encounter (Pahner believes that he could achieve victory even when handed the most difficult of tactical problems) and highly regarded by his subordinates. Kar is a Guardsman to his heart who habitually wears an armored jerkin and harness of a Guardsman private without all the finery and regalia his rank entitles and it was ceaseless battle to get a decent budget for the Guard, prior to the marines' arrival, that permitted K'Vaern's Cove to repel the Boman's first wave of attacks. Kar, having seen the Diaspran veterans in training, enthusiastically embraces the marines' innovations in warfare and military technology and forces his own troops to do the same, tolerating no form of insubordinate behavior (going so far as executing a highly incompetent commander who endangers the war effort in the middle of a battle).

Tor Flain is Bistem Kar's second-in-command. Flain was born in D'Sley and moved to K'Vaern's Cove as a child, where his family had risen from a tiny fish processing business to a noted provider of luxury goods including a chain of high-end restaurants. Flain did not find a place for himself in the family business as an adult and therefore joined the City Guard, a position that has since helped the family business much. As a result of this success (and the general success of the city) Flain loves K'Vaern's Cove and would happily lay down his life for it.

Turl Kam is Chairman of the Council of K'Vaern's Cove. A former fisherman who lost his leg when a clumsily run line cut it off (and he being hungover at the time), he opted to sell his boat and go into politics. After years of wheeling and dealing he managed to reach the Chairmanship only to have the Boman invade on his watch, which frustrates him to no end. Kam represents the local fishermen and short-haul cargo sailors (essentially the labor class faction) on the Council and is willing to embrace any opportunity to break the siege the Boman have laid around his city. At the same time he is not blind to the possible repercussions of warfare and demands to know if Pahner and the marines really think they can win.

Wes Til is a prominent member of the K'Vaernian Council and the owner of a large shipping business. Representing "old money" and the major businesses in the city, Til sees the opportunity for both military victory and economic gains with the marines' arrival and readily agrees to build the ships the marines need to cross the ocean in exchange for ownership of the ships after the voyage and in getting a lock on a new market and shipbuilding techniques. Til is also a wily and humorous character who is intrigued by the humans on many levels but is clearly an "upperclass" sort of person, openly asking Roger about human sexuality. He has many dealings with O'Casey and embraces her plans for getting the citizenry enthusiastic about taking the war to the Boman and putting the full weight of his status and position behind the war effort.

Dell Mir is a quirky but brilliant K'Vaernian engineer who designs the new weapons and devices the marines envision in the war with the Boman. Mir began his career as an ordinary apprentice smith but has since been recognized as a genius inventor and "a wizard with contraptions" with the war against the Boman bringing out the genius in him. He works closely with Rus From on designing the gunpowder weapons, dropping ideas like rain with a troop of assistants writing down his every word.

Fullea Li'it is the widow of a D'Sley fisherman who organized a sealift to evacuate all the women and children out of the city when it was run over by the Boman. A tough-minded and keen businesswoman, Li'it had to rebuild her business after her husband was killed at sea and his brother had taken over and run it into the ground. Her business acumen put her in a position to arrange the sea lift that saved most of the city's civilians and she is instrumental in arranging a sea lift back to D'Sley and in providing guides to the city (mostly females) once operations begin.

Kny Camsan is the paramount war leader of the united Boman barbarian tribes. After the first disastrous attempts to take the city of Therdan and the death of the previous paramount war leader, Camsan ascended to the position and led the Boman to an unbroken chain of victories. His long-term plans are much more ambitious as he intends to forge an empire for the Boman tribes in the region of the Tam and Chasten Vallies and has chosen Sindi as his capital. Camsan is devious and ruthless as he orders all the Boman women and children to Sindi "for their protection" while really using them as hostages to control the other tribes. However, his aura of invincibility has begun to fade as the continued siege of K'Vaern's Cove has made the tribes restive and who wish to finish the Cove off and return home.

Mnb Trag is a Boman chieftain and Camsan's closest ally in Sindi. Privy to Camsan's ultimate plans for their people and in complete agreement with him, Trag helps Camsan in navigating the dangerous politics of the Boman tribes where weak leaders always end up dead. He often appears receptive to other people's ideas and needs (even when Camsen is not) so as to defuse tense situations between the various tribal leaders and Camsan. He also voices his opinions to Camsan honestly, sometimes telling him uncomfortable truthes he needs to hear, yet Camsan trusts him enough to leave him behind in Sindi when he is forced to take his troops out and fight.

Tar Tin is a Boman chieftain and one of Camsan's greatest rivals. He is a chieftain of the "old school" of Boman warfare (believing in the exalted power of the battle frenzy) and strongly supported the previous paramount war leader whom Camsan replaced, deeply resenting Camsan's youth and the fact that he has been shunt aside from serious tactical decisions. He and his tribe are the most restless under Camsan's leadership.

Tor Cant was the Despot of Sindi, who desired to rule the region around the Tam and Chasten Rivers. However, his ambitions far outweighed his capabilities. He attempted to destabilize the League of the North by acts of sabotage of its city-states to cast mutual suspicion. When this plan failed, he sought to make the League irrelevant by negotiating a peace treaty between the Boman tribes and the city-states of the South. However, he had presented insulting demands to the Boman chieftains and when they were rejected, he threw a fit in the throne room and ordered them killed (though this too was planned). As a result, the Boman declared war against all the city-states of the South. Cant had believed that the League would be able to resist the Boman but would be weakened sufficiently to allow him to conquer it in turn. However, he miscalculated the anger his murder of their chieftains would cause, as they swore to destroy all the cities of the south and did so with an unprecedented degree of unity. Eventually the League fell to the Boman, who then continued to Sindi where they sacked the city and seized him and his ministers. He eventually died at the hands of the Boman, who took special pleasure in torturing him to death, despite his attempts to barter for his life with information on his previous sabotage attempts on the cities in the region.

== Plot summary ==
After the events in Marshad (at the end of the previous book) Roger and his marines manage to cross the Hadur region with little incident and begin ascending the mountains dividing the continent seeking a way through them. They awaken one morning to discover that the temperature has dropped to a pleasant 23 degrees and that the air is no longer humid. While the humans revel in the pleasant weather (for them) and brake out the coffee, the Mardukans are found to be nearly comatose. After they warm up, Pahner convenes a council of war to determine how to proceed. Cord, being honor-bound to Roger, must continue and can survive with the use of dinshon exercises (which he can teach to his partially trained nephews). D'Len Pah and his tribe of mahouts, however, are not so trained and cannot continue. This poses a problem for the marines since the flar-ta pack beasts are owned by the mahouts. After some negotiations the marines decide to buy all but one of the beasts from D'Len Pah and his clansmen, who part ways with the marines and return to the lowlands with one Cord's nephews. Shortly afterward, the marines spot a large city in a mountain valley, but are attacked by a herd of wild flar-ka before getting there. While they manage to kill the herd, casualties are high and Pahner decides, upon reaching the city (called Ran Tai) that it's time for a respite. Having bought the pack-beasts from the D'Len Pah, the marines are seriously strapped for cash and Roger offers to take a squad of marines and look for some relatively low-risk but high-paying job. While Pahner is appalled at the idea of turning his troops into mercenaries, he reluctantly agrees that they have little choice if they hope to reach the coastline with enough money to charter or build a ship.

Roger soon finds a high-paying job: a local mine-owner has had his mining operation taken over by "barbarian" squatters from the lowlands and offers a month of output in gold to whoever manages to evict them. At night, Julian leads a team up the mountain behind the mine (an area too cold for the Mardukans to survive in) and scales down the mountain face, straight into the camp around the mine and manages to subdue the few guards with zero casualties for either side. Roger then awakens the leader of the squatters, Rastar Comas T'Norton, at gun point, telling him to pack up and leave, a "request" Rastar reluctantly agrees to. However, when asked where the gold from the mine is (being the payoff the marines were supposed to receive), Rastar laughs and tells them they found no gold either. After a search of the mines yields nothing, Roger and his squad return disheartened to Pahner, who orders them to get a drink at the local taverns. Kosutic realizes the Captain is up to something and follows him to the mine, where they find the previous foreman of the mine pumping out a flooded shaft where he had hidden the gold, prior to the squatters' arrival. Though he tries to buy off Pahner and Kosutic, Pahner refuses to let leave with the gold and Kosutic is forced to shoot him dead when he pulls out a pistol. As they pack up their gold, Pahner wonders how to tell Roger that his mission wasn't a failure after all and Kosutic advises him not to tell Roger just yet (as part of his learning experience).

The time Ran Tai, turns out to be profitable in other ways as well. Doc Dobrescu discovers that a local fruit called targhas (dubbed an Apsimon) contains a Vitamin C analogue that could be converted by the marines' and Roger's nanites. Pahner, realizing that the original survey of the planet was woefully incomplete, orders to Dobrescu to test every food they encounter for their other trace dietary needs. Pahner also discovers the Bisti root, a spicy plant that is chewed by the locals, which replaces the chewing gum he's run out of. The down time also allows several romances to flourish (strictly against regulations), most significantly between Julian and Kosutic and between Roger and Nimashet. Unfortunately, Roger, being very drunk after the raid on the mine, mangles an attempt to tell Nimashet that he doesn't "fool around", insulting her in the process and souring the atmosphere between them.

The humans eventually depart Ran Tai at the head of a large caravan headed to Diaspra and are soon attacked by the Boman tribesmen. While the Mardukan guards caravan fall apart in the attack, the marines manage to hold their own with a wall of shields and swords, but not manage to break the attack. Help however, comes from an unexpected source, when the troops they kicked out of Ran Tai charge to their rescue. After the attackers are routed and killed, Rastar approaches Captain Pahner with an offer: his troops will join the caravan as guards in exchange for payment in gold and food for the troops and civilians. After some haggling an agreement is reached and the Vasin join the humans in defending the caravan against additional attacks by the outriders of the Boman invasion. The Vasin turn out to be well-organized troops who are used to fighting in groups on civan backs and they integrate well with the humans. They eventually manage to arrive at Diaspra, fighting their way to the city gates and being greeted quite well by the locals, who are entirely too happy to see them.

At Diaspra, Rastar finds several thousand Vasin cavalrymen who are pitifully happy to see him and their families and who immediately transfer their loyalty to him, giving him a seat on the ruling council. However, that is all the good news to be had as Gratar, the Priest-King of Diaspra, tells them that the Wespar tribe of the Boman has encircled the city, preventing any to approach to the barley-rice fields. Even worse (from the marines' perspective), the main Boman horde is between them and the sea, making the journey there all but impossible. At the council meeting, emotions run high between the Vasin commanders and the Diaspran members of the council, over past grievances and the current situation, forcing Pahner to intervene and tells them that they must decide whether or not they wish to survive. When Gratar expresses their desire to survive, Pahner says that to achieve this, they will have to make many uncomfortable decisions and forget the niceties of normal business. To that end, he instructs the council to set guards on the city's privately owned granaries, dole out food at fixed quantities and prices, begin training local forces and conscripts in the new techniques of the humans and force an engagement with the Wespar at a time and place of their choosing. The council members are skeptical of the humans' promises that their techniques can win this war but eventually agree and General Bogess, Diaspra's military commander, requests that the Laborers of God be drafted as soldiers. Many on the council, including Gratar, are not happy with this request since it would mean no one will be available to maintain Diaspra's flood defenses just as the seasonal Hompag Rains are about to begin. Roger, in turn, points out that in such evil times, Diaspra will have to choose between greater and lesser evils and that although maintaining the "Works of God" is important, the damage to them can be repaired, but only if the city survives. Gratar relents and releases the Laborers of God to Bogess.

The marines immediately begin training the new recruits, first in how to be soldiers and finally in pike and shield combat techniques. At the same time, the Vasin cavalry train with the Diaspran regulars while the Marines ride roughshod on the Diaspran artisans and businesses to produce the materials and weapons they need for the battle to come. However, the marines find their efforts to fight the Boman threatened by certain political factions who are trying to get back to "business as usual" by placating the Boman. Grath Chain, representing these groups, petitions the priest-king to offer the Boman some of the wealth of Diaspra so that they might leave to city alone. Roger, who is caught unprepared by this challenge at the petition ceremony, manages to answer nonetheless by stating that "once you pay the Danegeld, you will never be rid of the Dane". If Diaspra chooses to buy off the Boman, they might just decide to stay, demanding more and more gold until none is left, at which point they'll finish the city off anyway. Fearing that internal political problems could endanger the whole war effort, the marines decide to bug the city's council members. What they discover points to a long existing conspiracy, whose members all answer to "the creator" and who are very security conscious and secretive, all of which hampers the marines ability to discover their agenda.

As the day of battle draws nearer, Roger is summoned to Gratar, who is seriously conflicted over which course of action to take regarding the Boman. Looking over that torrential Hompag Rains and the immense power of nature, Gratar is unsure which enemy to placate: the God of the Torrent or the Boman. Roger repeats what he stated at the audience about buying off the Boman and further points out that even if they were left alone by the Boman, they would lack the funds to pay for the repairs to the Works of God. He then tells Gratar of the ancient city of Angkor Wat, who was also ruled by priests, who had failed to lead the city against barbarian invaders. Roger tells him that those priests had failed to accept the reality that their world had change and that they needed to change with it and in doing so, failed in their responsibility as rulers of their people. A heavy-hearted Gratar tells Roger that he will announce his decision at the traditional "Drying Ceremony" at the end of the Hompag Rains. The marines, who continue their surveillance efforts, discover a message at a dead drop which states that the cabal will attempt to approach the marines and gain their support.

Shortly before the ceremony however, Roger is approached by Rus From who offers to arrange a meeting with "the creator". Roger agrees, after notifying the two marines with him who in turn, notify Pahner, who orders the meeting be monitored. As the marines set up the equipment Roger and his guards are led underground where they are told to remove their helmets and pass through a waterfall so as to defeat any listening devices (though From is unaware of the Toots and their transmission capability). Roger and his guards comply and pass under the waterfall, finding themselves in a cavern on the other side. There they find several hooded Mardukans who From identifies as the "dark mirror" of the council. The hooded figures and From explain that they desire a change in the direction Diaspra's going because they fear Gratar is leading them into ruin. With his single-minded focus of the Works of God, less and less young Diasprans are inclined to become artisans. In addition, the group already feared that other city-state were eying them greedily and would have attacked had the Boman not moved in first. From also feels frustrated as a "creator" of things, since all he can build are pumps, pumps and more pumps. As such, the group wants the humans to turn the "New Model Army" into the city after the battle and take the temple. The marines, who have monitored the conversation, manage to identify every hooded figure who speaks and find that most of the council and several prominent merchant are members of the cabal (O'Casey commenting that it is "Quorum of the Senate of Rome"). Roger tips his hand and tells the cabal that he knows who they are, that it's not their objective to fix every problem in their society and that they need to win the battle at hand and not start off a civil war. He further points out that they need to get to the drying ceremony quickly or else their absence will not go unnoticed.

As the rains subside and the Drying Ceremony begins, the marines suit up and prepare to use all their operational suits (despite the fact that it would mean using up their last spare parts for them) and listen to Gratar's speech in rapt anticipation. However, their worries are for naught: Gratar opts to fight the Boman. It is then that the recon teams report that the Boman are on the move.

The New Model Army and the Wespar tribe meet each other outside the city and the Boman begin posturing to dishearten the city defenders. Though the Diasprans manage to hold their calm, Roger loses his composure and, ignoring Pahner's furious calls to him, marches Patty across the No Mans Land between the two forces and meets the Wespar chieftain, Spear Mot, one-on-one. Despite the risk, Roger quickly manages to defeat and kill the chieftain, which disheartens the Boman, but raises the moral of the Diasprans who begin chanting Roger's name. Some minutes later, the Boman manage to regain their balance and march towards the Diaspran line. Despite their numerical disadvantage, the Diasprans hold the line for hours while many of the Boman die upon their pikes. The stalemate continues until the marines' recon team uses their advanced weaponry to hit the Boman from the rear. As the Boman in the rear turn to face this new threat, the pressure upon the Diaspran line eases, and Pahner orders a general advance. Yet the Boman front ranks still manages to hold, and Pahner orders Julian's armored squad to hit the Boman flank. The Boman line finally breaks and Vasin cavalry - along with Roger riding on Patty - pursue the Boman mercilessly, leaving very few survivors.

After the battle, Pahner is summoned before Gratar, who tells him that Grath Chain (who is present as well) has informed him of the plot against him and that the humans knew about it. Pahner admits this and that the marines would have supported the coup had he Gratar opted to appease the Boman. Gratar is both saddened and angered by this and says he will have the heads of the conspirators, yet Pahner points out that most of the council, including the now-victorious war leaders, were in on it. He further points out that most of the conspirators (not including Grath) were motivated, not by hatred of Gratar or the God, but by their opposition to the redundant Works of God and the stagnation of the city. He then advises Gratar on how to deal with all the changes and challenges he now faces in the wake of this battle and the conspiracy. The Laborers of God who desire to return to their old jobs should be allowed to return while those who have developed a taste for warfare should be allowed to remain in the army. The New Model Army should be sent off to K'Vaern's Cove as a relief force, to convince Diaspra's neighbor that they intend to be helpful neighbors in these troubled times and to remove it from the equation as Gratar grapples with the internal problems he faces. Pahner also suggests that he send Bogess and From along with them, not as a reward, but as exile from Diaspra, thus removing the two most prominent wartime leaders without whom the rest of the conspirators on the council will lose all legitimacy and attack each other as they are given the task of dealing with the displaced Laborers of God. But it is Pahner's advice about reducing the Works of God entailed in losing so many of the Laborers of God that most disturbs Gratar as he fears the Wrath. Yet Pahner points out that much of the canals and dikes are redundant. Finally, Pahner advises him to use Grath as agent to destabilize any city-state that might threaten Diaspra and that for his service in exposing the conspiracy he should be given "30 pieces of silver".

The Marines depart Diaspra with the relief force and the Vasin cavalry and head to the Nashtor Hills, where they quietly seize control of the mines (as a precaution), purchase all the wrought iron the miners have there with From guaranteeing payment by Gratar (a parting shot on From's part), and notify the foreman that some of the troops will stay behind to protect them. From there they travel to the K'Vaern's Cove, where they are greeted at the outer gates by the enormous Bistem Kar and his deputy Tor Flain, who are astounded to see Rastar and the Vasin alive, happy for all the iron brought by the column and very curious about the humans. On their way into the city proper, Kar reveals that the situation in the city is not as sanguine as Rastar had initially believed: the war with the Boman caught them by surprise like everybody (so they hadn't stocked up), that they too had been sabotaged by the Tyrant of Sindi and that they have been burdened with caring for all the refugees from the fallen city-states in the region. Kar also inquires into the humans' involvement in this war and Roger tells him their intention to cross the ocean to get a continent on the other side to get back home. When he hears this Kar tells that none who attempted to cross the ocean have returned while a single shipwreck with a lone, crazed survivor arrived from the other side, claiming that his ship was ripped apart by some sea monster.

The humans and the Diasprans are brought before the K'Vaernian Ruling Council to give an account of the Battle of Diaspra and to present their intentions. General Bogess' account of the battle is met initially with stunned silence and then derision and disbelief. From then addresses the council and the citizens in the gallery, chastising them for being so close-minded, when their city was known for its acceptance of new ideas and concepts and offering the council assistance of their troops as training cadre and the iron for weapon-manufacturing. Finally, Roger speaks for the humans, stating that they need to get back home within a limited time frame, by crossing the ocean. He offers the K'Vaernians advancements in seafaring technology (piquing the interest of local shipping mogul Wes Til), their institutional knowledge in tactics and designs for new weapons for the war against the Boman. The council is still somewhat skeptical of all this, telling Roger that such a voyage would be both risky and costly. In a meeting afterwards, Portena returns with the bad news: the K'Vaernians' ships are unsuitable for deep-water travel which means they'd have to design new ships from scratch which will take time. Kostas then delivers his bad news: they only have enough dietary supplements for another four and a half months at most, even with the Apsimon fruits, leaving them with no margin for error. The meeting is interrupted by the arrival of many messengers from various powerful or influential Mardukans in the city with various dinner invitations for the Prince. Rastar informs them that securing the necessary political support will depend more on the success of these dinner parties than on anything else.

While O'Casey tries to decide which dinner invitation are the most important and whom to send to them, Roger dumps the job of getting the necessary clothes for all the marines attending on Costas with barely a day's notice. In retaliation, Kostas asks to join O'Casey to dinner she plans to attend, which leaves Roger with Nimashet as his escort. Roger, despite the discomfort of being around a very well-dressed Nimashet and the Mardukans' questions about human sexuality and his relationship with her, manages to conduct himself well at the dinner with Wes Til and Tor Flain. O'Casey and Kostas also have a successful dinner engagement with Fullea Li'it and Sam Tre, who press for the humans' support for the retaking of D'Sley and are eager to here O'Casey's opinions on how to secure the necessary capital to rebuild and reorganize a new government. After all the dinners are concluded, the marines and their Mardukan allies meet to decide on how to proceed. Everyone agrees that they need to help K'Vaern's Cove fight the Boman to secure the necessary political capital and physical materials to build the ships they need. It also becomes clear that being on condition red for several months now is wearing down the troops. Despite this, everyone is in favor for fighting the Boman for different reasons and Pahner decides to lend their assistance to the K'Varenians in exchange for building the ships they need as quickly as possible. After the meeting is concluded, Pahner asks to speak to Roger in private for a 'professional development' counseling session. He points out to Roger that while he has all the traits of a good leader (caring for the troops, not undercutting his NCOs and leading from the front), both to the marines and the Mardukans, he personally cannot put himself out on a limb since everybody will be trying to protect him as he does so. He also points out that his pursuit of barbarians gains little and risks too much and that he needs to let others do it. Roger understands this and reluctantly agrees.

Wes Til and Turl Kam meet to discuss the humans' terms and agree to them, bringing the rest of the council around and the city is thrown into frantic preparations for war. O'Casey begins her propaganda campaign by sending Mardukans into the local taverns to spread around silver and tales of loot from the Battle of Diaspra (to encourage the K'Vaernians to sign on) and generally causing fights (mostly by accident). Rus From teams up with Dell Mir to design and produce the necessary weapons and equipment the marines have sketched out while Julian, Krindi, Erkum and their squads keep an eye on the manufacturers to ensure decent quality (and threatening some of them when necessary). Kar teams up with Bogess to introduce the New Model Army's combat techniques (fighting with some conservative officers along the way) while some of the marines are sent off on reconnaissance missions against the Boman and others are sent to start training the K'Vaernians on the new weapons as they come out and oversee their production. Portena completes his "technology demonstrator" ship and awes the local shipwrights with its performance and begins construction of the actual ships needed for their voyage and recruits locals for the voyages. As the troops prepare to ship out, Turl Kam voices his innermost concerns to Pahner about the upcoming campaign and Pahner does his best to allay those concerns. Finally, when all is ready, the troops, with the assistance of Fullea Li'it and her organized sealift, embark on boats towards D'Sley and set up camp there and begin transferring the timber and ore still left in the city back to K'Vaern's Cove. The command staff assembles for the last time before moving out to discuss the latest intel regarding the Boman, the next stages of the operation and the role Roger's reserve force will play. Finally, Pahner orders them all to get as much sleep as possible since "there won't be much from here on out".

The operation begins with a group of several hundred Vasin arriving at the gates of Sindi, who begin to taunt the Boman to come out after them. While the Boman Supreme Leader, Kny Camsan, smells a trap and wishes to ignore them, his most trusted ally, Mnb Trag, points out that if he fails to deal with them himself, the other Boman warriors will believe him to be weak and likely kill him before replacing him. Nor can Trag go out himself since without him, Camsan is unlikely to survive. Camsan relents and takes out a force of over 32,000 warriors to chase the Vasin. As he predicted, the several hundred Vasin they chase join up with 4,000 other Vasin who are all equipped with the new pistols and some of the new rifles, all of which fire far better and reliably in a Mardukan downpour. The front rank of the Boman quickly disintegrates under the Vasin's fire, with the survivors either fleeing or getting cut down by lances. The Vasin then turn tail and retreat through a narrow jungle track and are pursued by the Boman. The track, however, has been lined with crude claymores and directional mines that are detonated once the Boman are inside. Over six hundred die in a single instant and the Boman charge falters. The shock of the explosions causes the warriors to question Camsan's decision to pursue the Vasin, but Camsan kills the one chieftain who truly challenges his authority then chastises the other Boman for their timidity in the face of mere cleverness and after they had "whined" for months that they should go after the K'Vaernians. Camsan then orders messengers to summon all the other Boman clans and orders a general chase after the Vasin.

The allied forces then move in on Sindi, assembling outside the city's walls and setting up wagons loaded with 12,000 crude rockets, which are then fired into the city. The confused defenders, who've never seen such weapons and therefore continued to stand in the open, are decimated by exploding fragmentation warheads and blast weapons, including Mnb Trag. Then Julian's armored squad moves in and starts blasting their way into the city with plasma fire, opening it to the rest of the army. Kar, who is stunned by the power of the marine's weapons, asks Pahner why hasn't ordered their use to clear out the city, since they're likely take losses clearing out the city. Pahner comes clean about their ultimate objective and their need to preserve as much of their limited supply of ammunition for a battle against their enemies, who are equipped with similar weapons (a concept that terrifies Bogess). From's engineering teams then start repairing the D'Sley-Sindi road in order to better transport the truly enormous amounts of loot that the Boman had hoarded in Sindi (including desperately needed food).

The Vasin continue to evade the Boman chasing them by continually splitting off into smaller groups in the jungle, which makes Camsan even more suspicious. Roger briefs his forces near a stream, who are awaiting orders to move out. However, tragedy strikes when Matsugae, who is filling up Roger's camel bag in the stream, fails to pay attention to the water and is subsequently attacked by a damncroc. Roger's troops manage to kill the creature but not in time to save Matsugae's life. As Roger prepares to conduct a short ceremony over Costas' body, Pahner comms in and orders his troops to move further down South. Roger scraps the ceremony reluctantly and orders Costas' body cremated. Roger's forces return to the Sindi-D'Sley road to assist in securing the laborers working there, but Roger himself isn't paying attention to anything because of Matsugae's death and simply turns over command to one of his subordinates. Upon hearing about this, Pahner decides to violate every regulation in the book to get Roger to function properly and sends Nimashet to speak to him. While Roger initially doesn't want to speak to anyone, he eventually opens up to Nimashet. He admits that his initial rejection of her was due to his awareness of his position in the succession and his determination not to bring into the world a bastard just like him, so he never "fooled around" (and hasn't had sex in over 10 years) and that only Costas had guessed why he acted this way and that he feels responsible for his death and the death of all the other marines he fell along the way. He also confesses his love for Nimashet. Nimashet, who knows she loves Roger as well, tells him that they are willing to die for him, now more than ever because they all knew the risks when they signed on. She also makes him promise to have sex with her when they aren't in the middle of a battle for their lives, but Roger instead promises to marry her when they get home. With Roger tracking again, Pahner orders him and his units to stay put and secure the rear while the Vasin continue to draw out the Boman in pursuit as they head back for Sindi. The city and its surrounding areas are made ready for the final stage of the operation.

The Boman eventually manage to cut off the Vasin's escape route and Pahner sends out skirmishers to retrieve them. Down to the South, Roger's battalion finds itself under attack by waves of Boman. Krindi Fain finds himself promoted to an officer when his company commander displays a serious lack of leadership. He then goes on to lead one of the teams of skirmishers sent into the jungles. The Vasin manage to retreat towards Sindi, with Kar's troops forming square around them and holding off the Boman's advances. Roger and his troops, despite being outnumbered, manage to defeat wave after wave of Boman. They too eventually retreat to Sindi, and the stage is finally set for the last phase of the operation.

As the Boman assemble in sight of Sindi, they are astounded to find the Sindi under the control of their enemies. Kny Camsan opts to decides to assemble all of the Boman's troops and besiege the city, but his decision is challenged by Tar Tin, who believe that the only way to defeat the enemy (and retrieve their women and children) is to storm the city through the gaps left in the walls. Camsan fears this approach after witnessing the effectiveness of the weapons that were used by the Vasin, the losses they've already suffered and the thought of what could've made those holes in the walls to begin with. Tin, however, is not willing to try any more of Camsan's "better ways", challenges him for the leadership position and kills him. He then orders an immediate charge to overwhelm the city and its defenders.

The Boman enter the city amid heavy rifle fire that slows their approach. The defenders then begin a well-prepared retreat south towards the Great Bridge of the city until finally most of the Allied forces are on the southern bank in the houses surrounding a large plaza specifically broadened so as to lure as many Boman into it. As Tin orders his troops across the bridge, another series of claymore mines is detonated while 400 riflemen and 300 cavalrymen open fire leaving no boman alive or unwounded on the bridge. Then another explosion rocks the bridge and for a moment Tin believes that they have managed to destroy the bridge, but as the smoke clears he sees that the bridge stands firm and orders his troops across again. The explosion however, allows the Allies rearguard to disengage from the enemy for enough time to retreat behind the gates of the bastion set up when the plaza was enlarged. Once the Boman fill the plaza, Eva orders the artillery to open fire and the riflemen and cavalrymen all open fire as well. Within minutes thousands of his warriors die under the onslaught and the Boman attempt to retreat across the bridge. Unfortunately for them, Julian's armored squad, which managed to evade them while staying on the other side of the bridge, opens fire into the retreating forces. The tidal wave of flechettes, cannon beads and plasma bolts finally breaks the back of the Boman's morale. Tar Tin, realizing the gross mistake he committed and the massive defeat suffered because it, commits suicide by throwing himself and his ax of office into the Tam River.

The Allies return victoriously to K'Vaern's Cove and the humans prepare for their transoceanic journey. However, the marines pick up on some radio chatter that might indicate that someone has gone in to investigate their abandoned shuttles. O'Casey and Cord manage to translate the log found aboard the shipwreck, which only confirms what Kar had told them about the ship being torn asunder by some sea monster. As the K'Vaernians celebrate the victory and the human's impending departure, Roger sits on the docks watching the sunset and scatters some of Costas' ash into the sea, before being called back by Nimashet.
