= Watch on the Rhine (novel) =

2005 novel by John Ringo

- Paperback cover
- Author: John Ringo; Tom Kratman
- Language: English
- Series: Legacy of the Aldenata
- Genre: Military science fiction
- Publisher: Baen Books
- Publication date: August 2005
- Publication place: United States
- Media type: Hardcover & paperback
- Pages: 496
- ISBN: 978-1-4165-2120-4

Watch on the Rhine is a military science fiction novel by John Ringo and Tom Kratman, the seventh entry in Ringo's Legacy of the Aldenata series.

The novel focuses on the invasion of Europe by the alien Posleen, with an emphasis on Germany. Part of the technology brought to humans by the Galactics is the ability to rejuvenate old soldiers, so that countries can draw on their combat experiences. In Germany, this leads to the controversial decision to reactivate the Waffen-SS.

The book's title is a reference to the 19th-century German nationalist song "Die Wacht am Rhein".

== Reception ==
The Frankfurter Allgemeine Zeitung published a scathingly negative review by Dietmar Dath. Summing up the novel's attitude as "cool retro-fascism from the future", the reviewer wrote that the authors' main aim (apart from propagating crude stereotypes about European countries) seemed to be to pontificate about the perceived failings of Western society, such as pacifism and environmentalism, to which the rejuvenated Waffen-SS appear intended to provide a positive contrast.

Sfreviews.net's reviewer likewise expressed incredulity at the novel's ahistorical conceit of portraying the Waffen-SS as misunderstood patriots who disagreed with the Nazis' genocidal policies, and at the writers' "pandering to the wingnut extreme of the far right" by drawing analogies from protests against resistance to alien invaders to real-life antiwar movements. Publishers Weekly described the novel as "audacious and deliberately shocking" in a starred review, adding that "Readers who can overcome their ideological gag reflex will be rewarded with an exciting view from "the other side of the hill."
