= The Last Centurion =

2008 science fiction novel by John Ringo

- Cover of paperback edition
- Author: John Ringo
- Language: English
- Genre: Military science fiction
- Publisher: Baen Books
- Publication date: August 5, 2008
- Publication place: United States
- Media type: Print (Hardback & Paperback)
- Pages: 448 p. (hardback edition)
- ISBN: 978-1-4165-5553-7 (hardback edition)

The Last Centurion is a 2008 stand-alone novel by John Ringo. It is written in "blog style" from the point of view of a U.S. Army officer known as "Bandit Six". The novel is set in a post apocalyptic world that has been ravaged by a brief ice age and disease.

== Plot ==
"Bandit Six", the book's protagonist, discusses his adventures following a withdrawal from the Middle East by U.S. forces in a time of chaos and disease. He commands a Stryker company that is left behind in Iran to guard a U.S. military equipment depot after a worldwide outbreak of mutated bird flu. He and his company repeat the journey of the Ten Thousand to return home, where he assists in agricultural recovery efforts and leads a military operation to regain control of a major American city.

== Themes ==
The novel touches on many different subjects. Although the military action is the focal point, health care, climate change, socialized medicine, disaster relief, and social responsibility are also examined in depth.

== See also ==
- Anabasis by Xenophon
