= Hell's Faire =

2003 novel by John Ringo

- Paperback cover
- Author: John Ringo
- Language: English
- Series: Legacy of the Aldenata
- Genre: Military science fiction
- Publisher: Baen Books
- Publication date: 2003
- Publication place: United States
- Media type: Hardcover & paperback
- Pages: 416 pp
- ISBN: 978-0-7434-8842-6
- Preceded by: When the Devil Dances (2002)
- Followed by: Cally's War (2004)

Hell's Faire is the fourth book in John Ringo's Legacy of the Aldenata series. Earth has been fighting the Posleen invasion, and suffered tremendous casualties. New weapons and tactics are being employed by the humans, but the Posleen are adapting as well.
