= The Church's One Foundation =

Hymn by Samuel John Stone

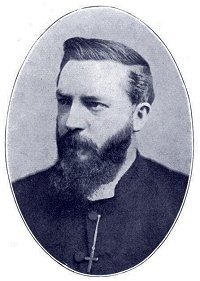
- Genre: Hymn
- Written: 1866
- Text: Samuel John Stone
- Based on: 1 Corinthians 3:11
- Meter: 7.6.7.6 D
- Melody: "Aurelia" by Samuel Sebastian Wesley

"The Church's One Foundation" is a Christian hymn written in the 1860s by Samuel John Stone.

== Background ==
The song was written as a direct response to the schism within the Church of South Africa caused by John William Colenso, first Bishop of Natal. When the bishop was deposed for his teachings, he appealed to the higher ecclesiastical authorities in England. It was then that Samuel Stone became involved in the debate. It inspired him to write a set of hymns titled Lyra Fidelium; Twelve Hymns on the Twelve Articles of the Apostles' Creed (1866).

"The Church's One Foundation" is included there under the ninth article, The holy Catholic Church; The Communion of Saints. The controversy is alluded to in the hymn's fourth verse: "Though with a scornful wonder men see her sore oppressed, by schisms rent asunder, by heresies distressed." The hymn is typically set to the tune "Aurelia" by Samuel Sebastian Wesley.

The words also served as inspiration for Rudyard Kipling's 1896 poem, Hymn Before Action, during his time in Africa.

As part of a move to exclude a range of traditional hymns, "The Church's One Foundation" was due to be excluded from the fourth edition of the Church of Scotland's Church Hymnary. It was, however, retained after many objections were submitted to the church committee.

== Tune ==
=== Lyrics ===
The hymn originally had seven stanzas, of which the first runs:

The church's one foundation
is Jesus Christ, her Lord;
she is his new creation
by water and the Word:
from heav'n he came and sought her
to be his holy bride;
with his own blood he bought her,
and for her life he died.

When the hymn came to be added to Hymns Ancient and Modern it was rewritten to include only five stanzas. In 1885, three more stanzas were added to the original seven for use as an ecclesiastical processional hymn in Salisbury Cathedral; this version was used again during the 1888 Lambeth Conference.
