= We Few =

2005 science fiction novel by David Weber

- First edition
- Author: David Weber & John Ringo
- Illustrator: John Ringo (maps)
- Cover artist: Patrick Turner
- Language: English
- Series: Empire of Man\Roger MacClintock series
- Genre: Science fiction
- Publisher: Baen Books
- Publication date: 2005
- Publication place: United States
- Media type: Print (paperback)
- Pages: 540
- ISBN: 978-1-4165-2084-9
- OCLC: 70173702
- Preceded by: March to the Stars

We Few is the fourth novel in the science fiction Empire of Man series by David Weber and John Ringo. It tells the story of how Prince Roger MacClintock and his remaining bodyguards of the Empress' Own Regiment have finally made their way off Marduk and must now try to retake the Empire from a usurper. The book appeared on the New York Times best seller list.

The title is derived from the famous St Crispin's Day Speech in Shakespeare's play Henry V (Act IV, Scene iii, lines 18–67), where before going into battle, King Henry rallies his troops, referring to "we few, we happy few, we band of brothers".
