= Death's Head (series) =

Novel series by David Gunn

Death's Head is a noir military science fiction series written by David Gunn. The series follows the antihero Sven Tveskoeg, an ex-sergeant of The Legion, in service to the Octovian Empire.

The series is narrated in the first-person from Sven's point of view, giving the reader a limited scope on the situations that surround Sven, but as the series progresses, Sven gets more and more entwined into the galactic politics surrounding him.

== Synopsis ==
The Series starts out with Sven trapped in a cage in a remote fort in the middle of nowhere waiting to be lashed to death as punishment for assaulting an officer. After miraculously surviving the punishment, the fort is attacked by an indigenous alien race called the Ferox. Everyone in the fort is killed except Sven, and the leader takes a liking to him. Sven then goes on to live with the primitive race of killing beasts. Several months later the Ferox are attacked by an elite human military force that is under the control of the empire of OctoV called Death's Head. They take Sven captive, taking him to their ship. There he is recruited and learns that he's special due to the fact that he is not entirely human, which explains his remarkable healing abilities and fighting prowess. Sven goes through several tests, including surviving a stint on a frozen prison planet, and successfully assassinating a senator. After being fully admitted into Death's Head, Sven then goes on to fight the Uplifted, sworn enemies of OctoV's empire. Behind the two civilizations is the United Free, a race so technologically advanced they are seen as gods. Sven becomes the leader of a small group of soldiers which he names The Aux, short for Auxiliaries. Sven, his fully AI side arm, SIG-37, and The Aux go on several missions to fight the Uplifted's elite fighting force, the Silver Fist.

== Novels ==
- Death's Head (book) (2007)
- Death's Head: Maximum Offense (2008)
- Death's Head: Day of the Damned (2009)
