= When the Devil Dances =

2002 book by John Ringo

- Paperback cover
- Author: John Ringo
- Language: English
- Series: Legacy of the Aldenata
- Genre: Military science fiction
- Publisher: Baen Books
- Publication date: 2002
- Publication place: United States
- Media type: Hardcover & paperback
- Pages: 688 pp
- ISBN: 978-0-7434-3602-1
- Preceded by: Gust Front (novel) (2001)
- Followed by: Hell's Faire (2003)

When the Devil Dances is the third book in John Ringo's Legacy of the Aldenata series. It follows the exploits of Michael O'Neal and other members of humanity as they defend Earth against an alien invasion by the Posleen.
