= Empire of Man =

Series of science fiction novels by David Weber and John Ringo

First omnibus edition

The Empire of Man (also called the Prince Roger series and the March Upcountry series) is a series of science fiction books by David Weber and John Ringo published by Baen Books. It combines elements of space opera and military science fiction.

The series tells the story of Prince Roger and his personal guard, the Bronze Battalion of the Empress's Own, as they cross the hostile and alien world of Marduk where they have been marooned. Roger is the spoiled younger son of the Empress of the largest polity in the galaxy, the Earth-based "Empire of Man". Roger, third in line to his mother's throne, is described at the start of the series as an over-handsome, but essentially useless fop. Part of this description comes from a reputation he owes to the acts and status of his father, the Duke of New Madrid, who is estranged from the empress.

== Plot summary ==
Roger is reluctantly persuaded by his mother to travel to Leviathan, a focal planet producing "grumbly oil" (used in commercial products such as colognes), to represent the royal family at a local celebration. Due to sabotage during the voyage, Roger; one company of the Bronze Battalion of the Empress' Own, bodyguards to the Heir Tertius of the Empire; his valet; his tutor and chief of staff (a staff of one); and four shuttle craft pilots are forced to land on Marduk, a largely unexplored and quite obscure planet officially, and loosely, a planet in the Empire of Man. Marduk, an extremely humid and rainy planet over much of its surface, is home to a species of four-armed sentient amphibians referred to as Mardukans (or unofficially, scummies), as well as a large number of generally hostile lifeforms of a very active biota.

Roger and Bravo Company of the Bronze Barbarians (his Imperial Marine bodyguards) must travel across Marduk from their crash site, a salt flat, to the only spaceport on the planet, where they plan to obtain a starship and return to civilization. Because there are hostile forces in the system who seem to have the spaceport under control, they can't merely send a distress signal. Along the way Roger and his group are forced to make alliances with a succession of local polities (of varied social types) ranging from hunter-gatherers to early gunpowder civilizations. The journey requires the Prince to shed his foppish tendencies and immature behaviors, earning the respect of the Marines who come to see their Prince in a new light. Sergeant Nimashet Despreaux becomes attracted to the Prince, particularly after his more capable and effective potential is revealed, and Roger in turn with her, leading to a romantic tensions in the midst of the long march.

Roger and the diminishing Company, supported by a growing group of Mardukan allies, eventually find their way to the spaceport and off the planet, but not before Roger learns that his siblings (and their families) have been killed and that the Empire (and some beyond) believes that Roger himself was responsible. In fact, Roger's biological father, the Duke of New Madrid, and his ally, Prince Jackson Adoula, set up the sabotage of his ship, and have framed Roger for the crime, he being conveniently lost and certainly dead. They have also taken the Empress captive, using a combination of cybernetic tampering, torture, sexual slavery, and drugs to control the normally ironwilled Empress. The conspirators plan to put a second son of New Madrid (being matured in an incubator) and the Empress on the Throne.

Roger and the remaining 14 members of Bravo Company return to Earth, set themselves up as restaurateurs, make contact with former members of the Empress's Own, and with considerable difficulty, successfully launch a counter-coup. With the Empress rescued, the fetus destroyed by one of the conspirators' followers, and New Madrid in custody, Roger must cope with his mother's severely damaged condition, a half-destroyed navy, rebuilding the palace, restoring the line of succession, and with the very nearly inevitable threat of civil war thanks to the escape of Jackson Adoula. The fourth novel ends with the Empress abdicating the throne due to her condition, leaving Roger to reign as Emperor of the Throne of Man over an uncertain future.

== Books in the series ==
1. March Upcountry (2001) (read online)
2. March to the Sea (2001) (read excerpt)
3. March to the Stars (2003) (read excerpt)
4. We Few (2005) (read excerpt)

Omnibus collections

1. Empire of Man (February 2014) ISBN 1476736243; collects March Upcountry and March to the Sea
2. Throne of Stars (August 2014) ISBN 978-1476736662 collects March to the Stars and We Few

== Future novels ==
Both John Ringo and David Weber have said that they plan on writing more Empire of Man novels, Ringo going so far as to reveal that, after We Few, three more books have been contracted for the series. Weber has yet to produce a formal outline for the subsequent novels, but has stated that he will not be continuing the Prince Roger storyline. Instead the novels will be prequels, focusing on Roger's ancestor, Miranda McClintock.

Despite Weber's earlier statements, several months later John Ringo spoke out about a possible new plan for continuing the series. If David Weber agreed, the next book to be published would take up right where the last book "We Few" left off. Since then three "snippet" chapters of an untitled "Empire of Man 5" novel have been posted, continuing the Prince Roger storyline.

In April 2025 John Ringo wrote on his Substack about future projects, "Though not Empire of Man. David’s done with that one and it’s his universe."
