= Samuel John Stone =

English clergyman (1839–1900)

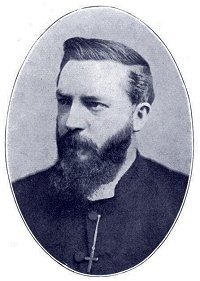
- Samuel John Stone
- Born: 25 April 1839; Staffordshire
- Died: 19 November 1900 (aged 61); London

Samuel John Stone (25 April 1839 – 19 November 1900) was an English poet, hymnodist, and a priest in the Church of England.

== Life and career ==
Stone was born on 25 April 1839 at his father's rectory in the parish of Whitmore, Staffordshire. His father, William, was a Hebrew scholar and a botanist alongside his clerical work, who had published various works including a six volume religious epic and various compilations of hymns. Samuel had one sister, Sarah, who was born two years after him. When Samuel was 13 the family moved to London where his father had obtained a curacy.

Following his schooling at Charterhouse he went up to Pembroke College, Oxford, gaining a BA in 1862 and being awarded an MA in 1872. During that period too he was awarded the 1866 prize for a poem on a religious subject, in this case on Sinai, but was then deprived of it since he was no longer on the college books. He served a curacy in New Windsor from 1862 and while there wrote for his congregation the hymns of Lyra Fidelium, in which his most famous hymn, The Church's One Foundation, appears. In 1870 he moved to St. Paul's, Haggerston where, in 1874, he became the vicar. He remained at Haggerston for twenty years before taking up his final post at All Hallows' London Wall also in London.

Stone died on 19 November 1900.

== Select bibliography ==
=== Poems ===
- The Knight of Intercession (1872)
- Sonnets of the Sacred Year (1875)
- Deare Chylde, a Parish Idyll (1877)
- Lays of Iona and other poems (1897)
- Poems and Hymns (1903)

=== Hymns ===
- Lyra Fidelium: Twelve Hymns on the Twelve Articles of the Apostles' Creed (1866) including "The Church's One Foundation".
- Hymns (1886)
