= David Gunn (author) =

British writer

David Gunn is the author of the military science fiction Death's Head series. His debut book, Death's Head, was published in 2007, followed by Death's Head: Maximum Offense in 2008, and Death's Head: Day of the Damned in 2009. In October 2009, Gunn estimated that six more books would be needed to complete the story he has in mind.

The Death's Head novels are narrated in the first person by Sven Tveskoeg (see Svend Tveskæg for his namesake), a violent legionnaire who becomes a member of the Death's Head regiment. Sven collects a symbiont and an intelligent gun in the course of his adventures, as well as a group of other soldiers known as "The Aux" (for auxiliaries.) Sven is 98.2% human and 1.8% "something else" and is able to tolerate, and quickly recover from, major physical stress and damage.

The galaxy is dominated by three political groupings: By far the largest and by far the most technologically advanced is the United Free; the other two are the Uplifted and Enlightened and the Octovian Empire who are roughly equal in size and at war, with the United Free refereeing the conflict. Sven is an adherent of the Octovians, named after Emperor OctoV, who appears to be a fourteen-year-old boy but is actually something much different. There are intimations that OctoV has a special interest in Sven.

== Biography ==
Not much is known about the author. The brief biography of the author provided by his publisher states that Gunn comes from a service family, that he has undertaken assignments in the Middle East, Central America, and Russia, and that he lives in the United Kingdom. David Gunn lives in Balsall Common, Coventry and is now retired. Series has been abandoned due to sickness.

== Bibliography ==
=== Novels ===
- Death's Head Series
  - Death's Head (2007), ISBN 978-0-345-50376-3
  - Death's Head: Maximum Offense (2008), ISBN 978-0-345-50869-0
  - Death's Head: Day of the Damned (2009), ISBN 978-0-345-50002-1
