= Hymn Before Action =

1896 poem by Rudyard Kipling

"Hymn Before Action" is a poem written by Rudyard Kipling in 1896. It takes the form of a prayer by troops to God and to Mary on the eve of battle.

== Publication history and reception ==
The poem was inspired by the 1860 hymn The Church's One Foundation by Samuel John Stone. It was written and published in The Times at a time when news of the botched Jameson Raid of January 1896 reached Britain. Accordingly, it has been read as an expression of foreboding about increasing Great Power hostility to Britain – "The Nations in their harness / Go up against our path" – as a comment on filibustering and as an argument for responsible imperialism under God and the Law:

From panic, pride, and terror,
Revenge that knows no rein,
Light haste and lawless error,
Protect us yet again.

Published in Kipling's 1896 collection of poetry, The Seven Seas, the patriotic hymn was among the works that consolidated Kipling's reputation as "The Laureate of Empire". Roger Pocock, the founder of the Legion of Frontiersmen, did not appear to notice Kipling's complex vision of the imperial task when he praised the poem in a letter to Kipling as "the biggest thing you've written so far."

In 1930, an English choir drew some attention by refusing to sing the hymn on account of its "pagan character". The choir's secretary argued that it might be appropriate for "troops of savages bent on slaughter," but presented "a primitive, unworthy conception of the Deity".

The poem was set to music in 2000 by Welsh composer Karl Jenkins for his Mass setting The Armed Man.

== Text ==
The earth is full of anger,
The seas are dark with wrath,
The Nations in their harness
Go up against our path:
Ere yet we loose the legions—
Ere yet we draw the blade,
Jehovah of the Thunders,
Lord God of Battles, aid!

High lust and froward bearing,
Proud heart, rebellious brow—
Deaf ear and soul uncaring,
We seek Thy mercy now!
The sinner that forswore Thee,
The fool that passed Thee by,
Our times are known before Thee—
Lord, grant us strength to die!

For those who kneel beside us
At altars not Thine own,
Who lack the lights that guide us,
Lord, let their faith atone.
If wrong we did to call them,
By honour bound they came;
Let not Thy Wrath befall them,
But deal to us the blame.

From panic, pride, and terror,
Revenge that knows no rein,
Light haste and lawless error,
Protect us yet again.
Cloak Thou our undeserving,
Make firm the shuddering breath,
In silence and unswerving
To taste Thy lesser death!

Ah, Mary pierced with sorrow,
Remember, reach and save
The soul that comes to-morrow
Before the God that gave!
Since each was born of woman,
For each at utter need—
True comrade and true foeman—
Madonna, intercede!

E'en now their vanguard gathers,
E'en now we face the fray—
As Thou didst help our fathers,
Help Thou our host to-day!
Fulfilled of signs and wonders,
In life, in death made clear—
Jehovah of the Thunders,
Lord God of Battles, hear!

== Bibliography ==
- Kipling, Rudyard (1896). The Seven Seas. London: Methuen. pp. 102–104.
- Various republications.
