= The Tuloriad =

2009 novel by John Ringo

- Cover of Paperback Edition
- Author: John Ringo, Tom Kratman
- Language: English
- Series: Legacy of the Aldenata
- Genre: Military science fiction, Novel
- Publisher: Baen Books
- Publication date: October 6, 2009
- Publication place: United States
- Media type: Print (Hardback
- Pages: 432 (hardback edition)
- ISBN: 978-1-4391-3304-0 (hardback edition)

The Tuloriad is a 2009 military science fiction novel by John Ringo and Tom Kratman, as part of the Legacy of the Aldenata series. It is set after the defeat of the Posleen on Earth, and follows the struggle of that race to survive.

Roland Green of Booklist praised the battle descriptions and Publishers Weekly called the book "an intriguing discussion of the power of faith".
