= Tom Kratman =

American author and soldier (born 1956)

- Born: September 4, 1956 (age 70); Boston, Massachusetts, U.S.
- Education: Boston College
- Occupation: Author
- Writing career
- Language: English
- Genre: Science fiction
- Notable works: A Desert Called Peace series, Big Boys Don't Cry (Hugo nominee), Watch on the Rhine (with John Ringo)
- Website: www.tomkratman.com

Thomas P. Kratman (born September 4, 1956) is an American military science fiction author and retired United States Army officer whose work is published by Baen Books. Kratman's novels include the Desert Called Peace series which has been praised for its action sequences and attention to philosophy of war. He authored three novels with John Ringo in the Legacy of the Aldenata series. Kratman's works often reflect right-wing political perspectives and some have been seen as deliberately crafted to offend left-wing sensibilities. During the Sad Puppies campaign in 2015, Kratman was nominated for a Hugo Award for his novella Big Boys Don't Cry.

== Biography ==
Kratman enlisted in the U.S. Army in 1974, attended Boston College on an Army scholarship and was commissioned as an officer in 1980. He went on to serve both in the invasion of Panama and the Gulf War. Kratman left active service for law school in 1992, graduating in 1995 after which he practiced law for some years. He was called back for service in 2003 and ended his Army career at the United States Army War College as Director, Rule of Law, for the Peacekeeping and Stability Operations Institute. Kratman retired in 2006 as a lieutenant colonel and became a full-time author. In an autobiography on his website, Kratman gives a personal perspective on his military career, discussing both the Gulf War and many years of deployment to Panama, where he met his wife. Kratman's success as an author has been explained as part of a 21st century turn towards military science fiction writers with first-hand military experience.

== Writing career ==
Kratman was recruited as an author by ex-soldier and publisher Jim Baen who "recruited a batch of younger, like-minded authors from similar backgrounds"; Kratman, Michael Z. Williamson, David Drake and John Ringo. Commonalities in the works of these authors include the setting of a civilization in decline with heroes battling against conventional wisdom. Kratman's first novel, A State of Disobedience (2003), deals with a revolution against tyranny in a future United States. The book was described by Lesley Farmer in Kliatt as a "libertarian-inspired combat story" with shallow characterization. Another politically-oriented stand-alone novel, Caliphate (2008), takes place in a future Islamic Europe where a German girl is sold into prostitution to pay her family's yizya. The work has been described as a part of a trend towards more speculative fiction focus on Islam after the September 11 attacks and as driving "some readers to apoplexy". Mark Steyn discussed the novel's political aspects at length and also described it as "a brisk page-turner full of startling twists and bad sex".

In the series begun with A Desert Called Peace (Note: The first novel, A Desert Called Peace, draws its name from a speech which the Roman historian Tacitus attributes to the Caledonian chieftain Calgacus.) (2007), the hero battles a worldwide Caliphate. The second novel in the series, Carnifex (2007), was praised by Publishers Weekly for its action sequences, characterization and attention to philosophy of war. The third novel, The Lotus Eaters (2010), placed #8 in the Wall Street Journal bestsellers list in the hardcover science fiction category. The fourth novel, The Amazon Legion (2011), was praised for its realistic descriptions by Booklist reviewer Jessica Moyer, who also cautioned that "repeated discourses on the physical limitations of women" might annoy female readers. The fifth novel, Come and Take Them (2013), was reviewed positively by San Francisco Book Review which described it as engaging and well crafted with Kratman excelling in "graphic descriptions of outrages and suffering." Library Journal praised the series for its "high standard of graphic and strategically detailed military sf".

Kratman has co-authored three novels with John Ringo in the Legacy of the Aldenata series. The first was Watch on the Rhine (2005) which tells of rejuvenated members of the Waffen-SS fighting alien invaders. German author Dietmar Dath criticized the book's politics and warned of the use of "cool retro-fascism from the future" as a propaganda tool. (Note: German: "den coolen Retrofaschismus der Zukunft.") Publishers Weekly called the book "audacious and deliberately shocking" but rewarding for readers who could "overcome their ideological gag reflex". The second novel was Yellow Eyes (2007), where a war against aliens is set in Panama. The book was described by Publishers Weekly as having vivid characters and satisfyingly detailed battle tactics. Roland Green at Booklist praised the book's action scenes and described its military science as intelligent though "sometimes overly political". The third novel, The Tuloriad (2009), draws on Homeric themes and tells of defeated aliens in search of a new home. Roland Green praised the battle descriptions and Publishers Weekly called the book "an intriguing discussion of the power of faith".

Short fiction by Kratman includes a contribution to the Forged in Blood (2017) anthology, which takes place in the Freehold universe created by Michael Z. Williamson and tells the story of a Japanese sword through centuries of history. Kratman's story deals with a character who talks to the sword in a contribution described by Tangent Online as "hilarious" and appealing for readers who are "into gore porn."

Kratman's work often reflects far right-wing perspectives and he "delights in offending left-wing sensibilities". During the Sad Puppies campaign in 2015, Kratman was nominated for a Hugo Award for his novella Big Boys Don't Cry (2014). Kratman's story placed third while "no award" won the most votes.

== Published works ==
=== Essays ===
- "The Amazon's Right Breast" (2011). As part of Baen's Free Nonfiction 2011.
- "Indirectly Mistaken Decision Cycles" (2012). As part of Baen's Free Nonfiction 2012.
- Training for War (April 2014; ISBN 978-1625793027), Baen Free Nonfiction.

=== Standalone works ===
- Big Boys Don't Cry (novella; 2000, 2014)
- A State of Disobedience (December 2003; ISBN 0-7434-9920-4)
- Caliphate (April 2008; ISBN 1-41655-545-5)
- Dirty Water (November 2023; ISBN 978-1982193003
- For the Eternal Glory of Rome (January 2026; ISBN 978-1668073070

=== Series ===
Legacy of the Aldenata

- Watch on the Rhine (August 2005, with John Ringo; ISBN 0-7434-9918-2)
- Yellow Eyes (April 2007, with John Ringo; ISBN 1-41652-103-8)
- The Tuloriad (October 2009, with John Ringo; ISBN 1-4391-3409-X)

A Desert Called Peace (Carrera)

- A Desert Called Peace (September 2007; ISBN 1-4165-2145-3)
- Carnifex (November 2007; ISBN 1-4165-7383-6)
- The Lotus Eaters (April 2010; ISBN 1-4391-3346-8)
- The Amazon Legion (April 2011; ISBN 1-4391-3426-X)
- Come and Take Them (November 2013; ISBN 1-4516-3936-8)
- The Rods and the Axe (July 2014; ISBN 978-1476736563)
- A Pillar of Fire by Night (November 2018; ISBN 978-1625796714)
- Terra Nova: The Wars of Liberation (August 2019; edited short-story collection; ISBN 978-1481484169)
- Days of Burning, Days of Wrath (July 2021; ISBN 978-1982125523)

Countdown

- The Liberators (February 2011; ISBN 1-4391-3402-2)
- M Day (September 2011; ISBN 1-4391-3464-2)
- H Hour (July 2012; ISBN 1-4516-3793-4)

The Romanov Reign

- The Romanov Rescue (October 2022; with Justin Watson and Kacey Ezell; ISBN 978-1982192266)
- 1919: The Romanov Rising (December 2024; with Justin Watson and Kacey Ezell; ISBN 978-1982193812)

== Award nominations ==
Kratman has received the following award or award nominations.

Year	Organization	Award title, Category	Work	Result	Refs
2004	Libertarian Futurist Society	Prometheus Award, Best Libertarian SF Novel	A State of Disobedience	Preliminary nominee	
2014	World Science Fiction Society	Hugo Award, Best Related Work	Training for War: An Essay	Nomination below cutoff	
2015	World Science Fiction Society	Hugo Award, Best Novella	Big Boys Don't Cry	3	
