= Yellow Eyes =

2009 novel by John Ringo

- Paperback cover
- Author: John Ringo and Tom Kratman
- Language: English
- Series: Legacy of the Aldenata
- Genre: Military science fiction
- Published: 2009 (Baen Books)
- Publication place: United States
- Media type: Hardcover & paperback
- Pages: 848
- ISBN: 978-1-4165-5571-1

Yellow Eyes is a 2009 military science fiction novel in John Ringo's Legacy of the Aldenata series, co-authored with Tom Kratman. The book, which is a spin-off of the main series, focuses on the Posleen invasion of Central America, with an emphasis on Panama. In contrast with other books in the series, emphasis is given to naval warfare, including the reactivation of the old warships USS Texas, USS Salem, and USS Des Moines.

== Reception ==
The book was described by Publishers Weekly as a "breathless page-turner". Roland Green at Booklist praised the book's action scenes and described its military science as intelligent though "sometimes overly political".
