= John Ringo =

American science fiction and military fiction writer (born 1963)

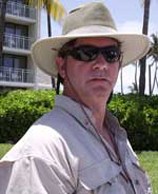
- Born: March 22, 1963 (age 63); Miami-Dade County, Florida, U.S.
- Occupations: Novelist, author
- Spouse: Miriam Ringo
- Children: 2
- Writing career
- Genres: Science fiction, military science fiction, military fiction, political thrillers, post apocalyptic, supernatural
- Website: johnringoauthor.substack.com

John Ringo (born March 22, 1963) is an American science fiction and military fiction author. He has had several New York Times best sellers. His books range from straightforward science fiction to a mix of military and political thrillers. He has over seven million copies of his books in print, and his works have been translated into seven different languages.

== Early life and military career ==
Ringo's father "was a civil engineer with an international firm"; before Ringo graduated in 1981 from Winter Park High School in Winter Park, Florida, he had spent time in 23 foreign countries, attending classes at fourteen schools. Among the countries he spent the most time in were Greece, Iran and Switzerland before he settled with his parents and six siblings in Alabama. This amount of travel brought what he refers to as a "wonderful appreciation of the oneness of humanity and a permanent aversion to foreign food."

After graduation, Ringo joined the United States Army and rose to the rank of Specialist in the 82nd Airborne Division. During his four years of active duty, he was assigned to the 1st Battalion, 508th Parachute Infantry Regiment, reflagged into 3rd Battalion, 505th Parachute Infantry Regiment when the 82nd reorganized its 3rd Brigade, plus two years of reserve duty with the Florida National Guard. Among his awards are the Combat Infantryman Badge, Parachutist Badge, Army Commendation Medal, Good Conduct Medal, Armed Forces Expeditionary Medal for his participation in the 1983 United States invasion of Grenada, and the National Defense Service Medal.

After discharge, Ringo earned an associate degree in marine biology. However, he quickly discovered that marine biology would only "pay for beans" and became a database manager to support his wife and two daughters.

== Writing career ==
In 1999, he had the idea for a science fiction story that involved an alien invasion and a military response that became the novel A Hymn Before Battle, the title referring to Rudyard Kipling's poem "Hymn Before Action", quoted extensively throughout the book.

The success of the book and its sequels allowed Ringo to quit his job and become a full-time writer. As of 2015, John Ringo had written 46 novels, some with co-authors David Weber, Michael Z. Williamson, Julie Cochrane, Linda Evans, Travis S. Taylor, and Tom Kratman.

He has also written a number of op-ed pieces for the New York Post, and been a guest commentator for Fox News and National Geographic.

In 2012, he was presented with the Phoenix Award at DeepSouthCon 50 in Huntsville, Alabama, in recognition of his contributions to science fiction literature.

Ringo coined the anti–political correctness slogan "get woke, go broke", citing political tensions in a fan convention following the 2000 United States presidential election and declining interest in organizations that embrace progressive cultural shifts. The term suggests that organizations that embrace social justice initiatives ("getting woke") will drive away significant, mostly conservative or apolitical fans and their interests, and thus lose money ("going broke").

In March 2023 John Ringo started his own substack "Ringo's Tavern" for his writing, saying he wanted to continue doing traditional publishing but as the nature of publishing was changing, this was his way of changing with it.

== See also ==
- The Crüxshadows, mentioned in the Paladin of Shadows series; the protagonist makes numerous mentions of the song "Winterborn" in particular. The main characters in Claws That Catch also play "Return" in order to defeat the aliens. The book Eye of the Storm quotes the song of the same name a few times. In the novel Von Neumann's War, the song "Citadel" is the anthem of the soldiers and it is played during the final showdown. The Black Tide Rising series also quotes the Crüxshadows extensively.
- Schlock Mercenary, a webcomic set far into the future. The Troy Rising series is inspired by the universe of Schlock Mercenary at the point of first contact. Also, a number of characters in the Black Tide Rising series state that they are fans of the Schlock webcomic, and often offer variations on the comic's "Rule 37" ("There is no 'overkill.' There is only 'open fire' and 'I need to reload!'").
- Sluggy Freelance, a webcomic featured in the Posleen Series books; a SheVa tank is named after the character Bun-bun. A character styled after Bun-bun is featured in The Council Wars series.
