= 1978 Nobel Prize in Literature =

Award

- Isaac Bashevis Singer
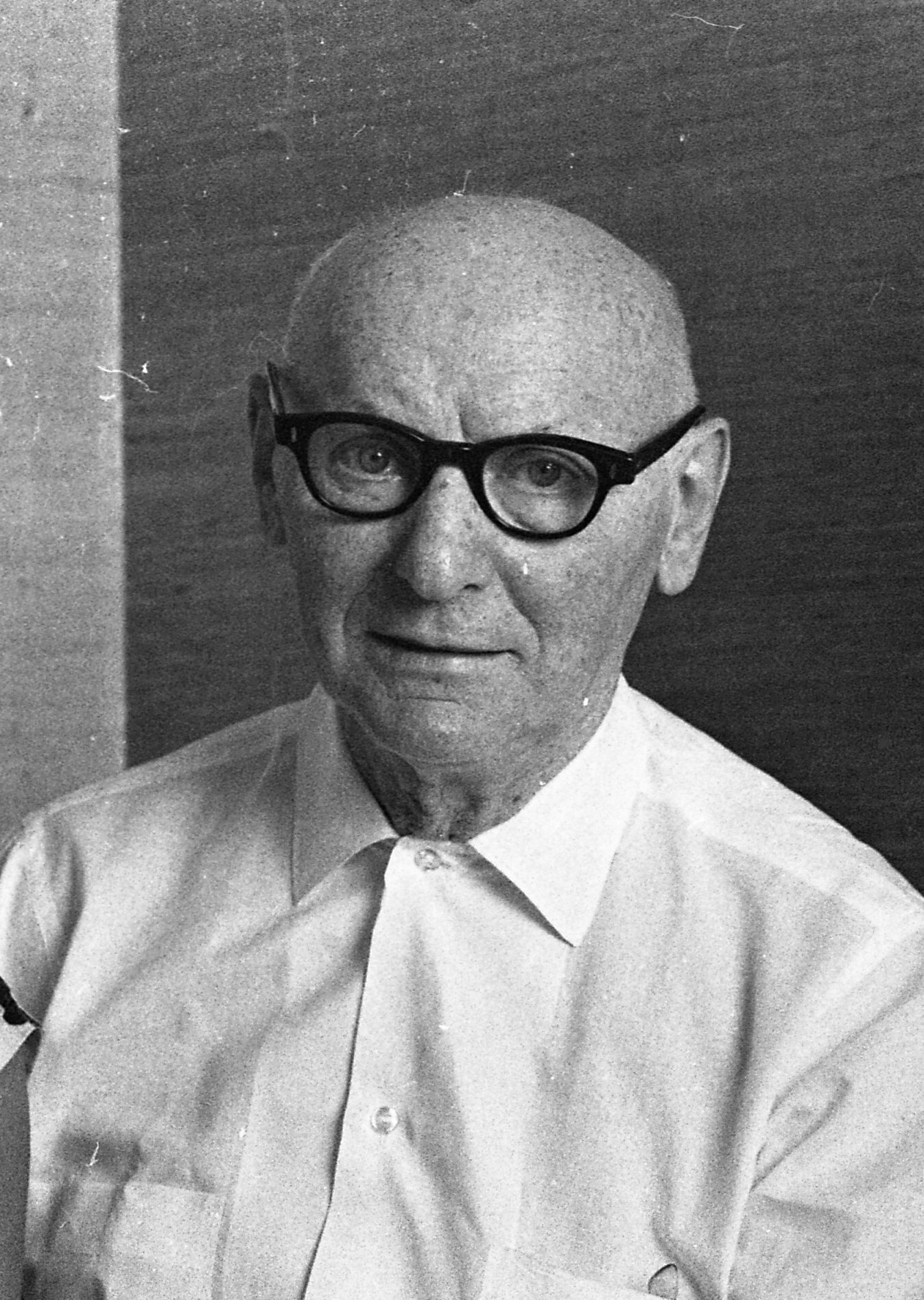
- "for his impassioned narrative art which, with roots in a Polish-Jewish cultural tradition, brings universal human conditions to life"
- Date: 5 October 1978 (announcement); 10 December 1978 (ceremony)
- Location: Stockholm, Sweden
- Presented by: Swedish Academy
- First award: 1901
- Website: Official website

The 1978 Nobel Prize in Literature was awarded to the Polish-born American Jewish writer Isaac Bashevis Singer (1902–1991) "for his impassioned narrative art which, with roots in a Polish-Jewish cultural tradition, brings universal human conditions to life." He wrote prolifically in Yiddish and later translated his own works into English with the help of editors and collaborators.

== Laureate ==
Isaac Bashevis Singer's Jewish upbringing and experience in the holocaust plays a significant role in his rich body of work that includes about 20 novels and several books for children. His literary debut started with first published story "Oyf der elter" ("In Old Age", 1925) which won the literary competition of the Literarishe Bletter, where he worked as a proofreader. His tales frequently span several generations, and many of them discuss how assimilation, secularism, and modernism have an impact on the family as in The Family Moskat (1950), The Manor (1967) and The Estate (1969). Jewish folklore and legends are frequently featured in his stories such as Zlateh the Goat and Other Stories (1966) and The Golem (1969). Several of the Singers' works have been adapted for film. Among his famous works also include Satan in Goray (1933), The Magician of Lublin (1971), and Enemies, A Love Story (1966)

== Reactions ==
The choice of Isaac Bashevis Singer was well received. The New York Times' Christopher Lehmann-Haupt wrote: "if influence and appeal are standards of Nobel excellence, then Singer is a worthy choice. For he has carried on the tradition of such Yiddish story-telling masters as Mendele, Aleichem, Peretz and Asch, and he has influenced a generation of America-Jewish writers now thriving in his wake."

== Nobel lecture ==
Delivered on 8 December 1978 at the Swedish Academy, Singer devoted much of his Nobel lecture to speaking about the yiddish language. “In a figurative way,” he said, “Yiddish is the wise and humble language of us all, the idiom of frightened and hopeful humanity.”

== Award ceremony speech ==
At the award ceremony in Stockholm on 10 December 1978, Lars Gyllensten of the Swedish Academy said:

The clash between tradition and renewal, between other-worldliness and pious mysticism on the one hand and free thought, doubt and nihilism on the other, is an essential theme in Singer’s short stories and novels. Among many other themes, it is dealt with in Singer’s big family chronicles – the novels The Family Moskat, The Manor and The Estate, from the 1950s and 1960s. These extensive epic works depict how old Jewish families are broken up by the new age and its demands and how they are split, socially and humanly. The author’s apparently inexhaustible psychological fantasy and insight have created a microcosm, or rather a well-populated micro-chaos, out of independent and graphically convincing figures. (...)

Singer has perhaps given of his best as a consummate storyteller and stylist in the short stories and in the numerous and fantastic novellas, available in English translation in about a dozen collections. The passions and crazes are personified in these strange tales as demons, spectres and ghosts, all kinds of infernal or supernatural powers from the rich storehouse of Jewish popular belief or of his own imagination. These demons are not only graphic literary symbols but also real, tangible forces. The middle ages seem to spring to life again in Singer’s works, the daily round is interwoven with wonders, reality is spun from dreams, the blood of the past pulsates in the present. This is where Singer’s narrative art celebrates its greatest triumphs and bestows a reading experience of a deeply original kind, harrowing but also stimulating and edifying. Many of his characters step with unquestioned authority into the Pantheon of literature where the eternal companions and mythical figures live, tragic – and grotesque, comic and touching, weird and wonderful – people of dream and torment, baseness and grandeur.
