= The Magician of Lublin =

The Magician of Lublin may refer to:

- The Magician of Lublin (novel), a 1971 novel by Isaac Bashevis Singer
- The Magician of Lublin (film), a 1979 drama film based on the novel
