= Certificate =

Certificate may refer to:

- A result of certification
- Certificate of authenticity, a document or seal certifying the authenticity of something

== Specific certificates ==
=== Personal records ===
- Birth certificate
- Death certificate
- Marriage certificate

=== Business and finance ===
- Certificate of deposit, or CD, a financial product commonly offered to consumers by banks, thrift institutions and credit unions
- Gift certificate
- Investment certificate
- Stock certificate

=== Computing ===
- Authorization certificate or attribute certificate
- Certificate (complexity), a string that certifies the answer to a computation
- Public key certificate, an electronic document used in cryptography
- Self-signed certificate, a public key certificate not issued by a certificate authority

=== Academic and professional qualification ===
- Academic certificate
- Certificate of Achievement (disambiguation)
- Medical certificate
- Professional certification, a vocational award
- A confirmation that a person has passed a test to prove competence
- Graduate certificate

=== Law ===
- A written document attesting to a fact, status, act, or legal requirement

== Other uses ==
- The Certificate (novel), a 1967 novel by Isaac Bashevis Singer
- The Certificate (album), a 2016 album by Duncan Mighty

== See also ==
- Certified (disambiguation)
- Certify (disambiguation)
- Motion picture rating system
