= Meshuga =

Meshuga, meshuga'at (feminine), meshugah, meshuggah, meshugge, etc., means "crazy", "insane", or "mad" in Yiddish, borrowed from Hebrew.

Meshuga may also refer to:

- Meshuga, a climbing route at Black Rocks, a climbing area in Derbyshire
- Meshugah, a 1994 novel by Isaac Bashevis Singer
- Meshugah, a fictional character in the novel Feet of Clay by Terry Pratchett
- Meshuggah, a Swedish extreme metal band
  - Meshuggah (EP), a 1989 extended play by the band
- Meshuggah, a song by Unknown Mortal Orchestra from the 2023 album V
- ha-Meshuggah ("the Madman"), a derogatory nickname for Muhammad by medieval Jewish writers
- Meschugge, a 1998 German film
