= Certify (disambiguation) =

To certify something is to attest that it meets certain requirements.

Certify may also refer to

- Certify Data Systems
- Certify (horse)

== See also ==
- Certificate (disambiguation)
- Certified (disambiguation)
