= Esther Kreitman =

Yiddish-language novelist (1891–1954)

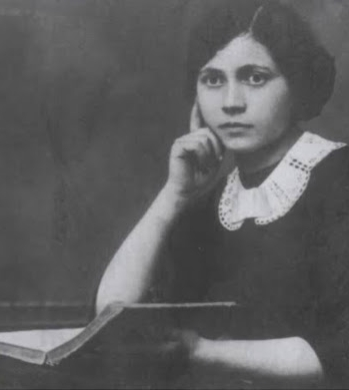
- Born: 31 March 1891; Biłgoraj, Vistula Land, Russian Empire
- Died: 13 June 1954 (aged 63); London, UK
- Occupations: Novelist, short story writer
- Writing career
- Language: Yiddish
- Genre: fictional prose

Hinde Ester Singer Kreytman (31 March 1891 – 13 June 1954), known in English as Esther Kreitman, was a Yiddish-language novelist and short story writer. She was born in Biłgoraj, Vistula Land to a rabbinic Jewish family. She had three younger brothers: novelists Israel Joshua Singer and Isaac Bashevis Singer and rabbi Moshe Singer.

== Early life and education ==
Kreitman was the daughter of Pinkjas Mendl Menachem Zynger (Singer) and his wife Basheve (Bathsheba), née Zylberman. Her father was a rabbi and an avid Hasid with a passion for mysticism. Kreitman's mother also came from a rabbinic, albeit non-Hasidic, family. The daughter of the rabbi of Biłgoraj, who was renowned in his day for his intellectual and spiritual character, she had benefited from an education comparable to that of her brothers.

Kreitman had an unhappy childhood. According to her son, Kreitman's mother gave her over to a poverty-stricken wet nurse for the first three years. The woman left the girl much of the time in a cot under a dusty table. Her mother visited the girl just once a week and never touched her. The dust damaged the child's sight, which she only partially regained. Later, although a highly gifted child, she had to watch her younger brothers being taught, while she was relegated to perform menial household duties.

Kreitman's first novel includes numerous scenes depicting the main female character's desires for education: scenes in which she waits with great anticipation for the bookseller to arrive in their town, dreams of becoming a scholar, and hides a Russian text-book from the male members of her family so that they won't find out she is studying in secret. It is likely that these incidents reflect Kreitman's own story.

== Career ==
In 1912, Esther agreed to an arranged marriage, and went to live with her husband, Avraham Kreitman, a diamond cutter, in Antwerp, Belgium. The events surrounding this marriage are described by both her in Deborah and by her brother Isaac Bashevis Singer in his autobiographical collection In my Father's Court.

In Antwerp her son, Morris Kreitman, was born. (He later was known by his journalistic pen name, Maurice Carr, and his novelistic pen name, Martin Lea.)

The outbreak of World War I forced the family to flee to London, where Kreitman lived for the rest of her life. She made two long return visits to Poland before World War Ii broke out.

Her marriage was not happy. She and her husband both worked in menial jobs, and she translated classic English works into Yiddish to earn extra money.

Although she had been the first in her family to write, she published relatively late in life, after her two brothers. Her first novel Der Sheydims Tants (Dance of the Demons) did not appear until 1936 in Poland. It was translated into English in 1946 by her son under the title Deborah. Her second novel, Brilyantn (Diamonds) was published in 1944. Yikhes (Lineage), her book of short stories, was published in 1949. Many of her works deal with the status of women, particularly intellectual women, among Ashkenazi Jews. Other works explore class relationships. Her short stories include several set in London during The Blitz of World War II, which she experienced.

After the war, Kreitman attempted to contact her mother and her third brother, Moshe Singer, who had become a village-rabbi in Poland. They had fled from Poland to the Soviet Union together with Moshe's wife. The Singers' father had died before the war.

Although Kreitman received two postcards from her relatives from the town of Dzhambul (today Taraz), in southern Kazakhstan, no further communication was forthcoming.

The forced evacuation of Jewish refugees to Central Asia under extremely harsh conditions was relatively common in the Soviet Union during World War II. Both her brother and mother are reported to have perished in 1946.

Israel Joshua Singer, the eldest of her three brothers, had died in New York in 1944, where he had emigrated a decade before. Her remaining sibling, Isaac Bashevis Singer, traveled from New York in 1947 to visit her in London.

Her relationship with her brothers had always been complex. Her son says that she constantly told him stories about her brothers. But when mother and son went to visit them in Poland in 1936, she felt rejected by both Isaac Bashevis and Moshe, and never talked about them again.

This feeling of rejection must have been aggravated after 1947, when Isaac Bashevis Singer refused to help her immigrate to the United States. He also failed to answer her letters or send any money, for which she had pleaded. Although he was then neither famous nor well-to-do, as he would become in his old age, he was comparatively financially secure at a time when Kreitman and her family were in great need in the damaged postwar London.

Kreitman's two brothers are not known to have encouraged or helped her as an author. Her books were never reviewed in the Yiddish daily The Forward, for which they both worked in New York City..

But the deep impression her personality made on both of them is reflected in their work. In Israel Joshua Singer's Yoshe Kalb, an unhappy and unstable seductress appears to be modelled on Kreitman. Isaac Bashevis Singer's Satan in Goray includes an innocent girl who is crushed by circumstance; she is described as having Kreitman's features and particularities. (Esther Kreitman suffered either from epilepsy or another physical or mental condition with similar symptoms, and later in life was diagnosed as paranoid.)

I.B. said that his sister was the model for his fictional play Yentl, about a woman from a traditional background who wishes to study Jewish texts. He considered Esther Kreitman the "best female Yiddish writer" he knew, but difficult to get along with. "Who can live with a volcano?" He dedicated the volume of his collected short stories The Seance (New York, 1968) "To the memory of my beloved sister".

== Death and legacy ==
Kreitman died in 1954 in London. Since her death, her works, which she wrote "in support of the Haskalah (Jewish enlightenment) from a female perspective," have been translated into French, German, Dutch and Spanish. Almost her entire small output is now available in English translation. There are only a few works of Kreitman translated into Polish, Kreitman's stories were published in Poland in 2016 (translated by Natalia Moskal). Her biography and works were the inspiration for the play "Hindełe, the Sister of the Magician" performed from 2017 in Lublin.

== Works in Yiddish and English ==
- Der Sheydim-Tants (Warsaw: Brzoza, 1936); translated by Maurice Carr as Deborah (London: W. and G. Foyle, 1946; republished London: Virago, 1983, New York: St. Martin's Press, 1983, London: David Paul, 2004, ISBN 978-0-9540542-7-4, and, as The Dance of the Demons, New York: Feminist Press, 2009, ISBN 978-1-55861-595-3).
- Brilyantn (London: W. and G. Foyle, 1944); translated by Heather Valencia as Diamonds (London: David Paul (2009), ISBN 978-0-9548482-0-0).
- Yikhes (London: Narod Press, 1949); translated by Dorothee van Tendeloo as Blitz and Other Stories (London: David Paul (2004), ISBN 978-0-9540542-5-0).
