= Ofer Ben-Amots =

Israeli-American composer

Ofer Ben-Amots עופר בן-אמוץ
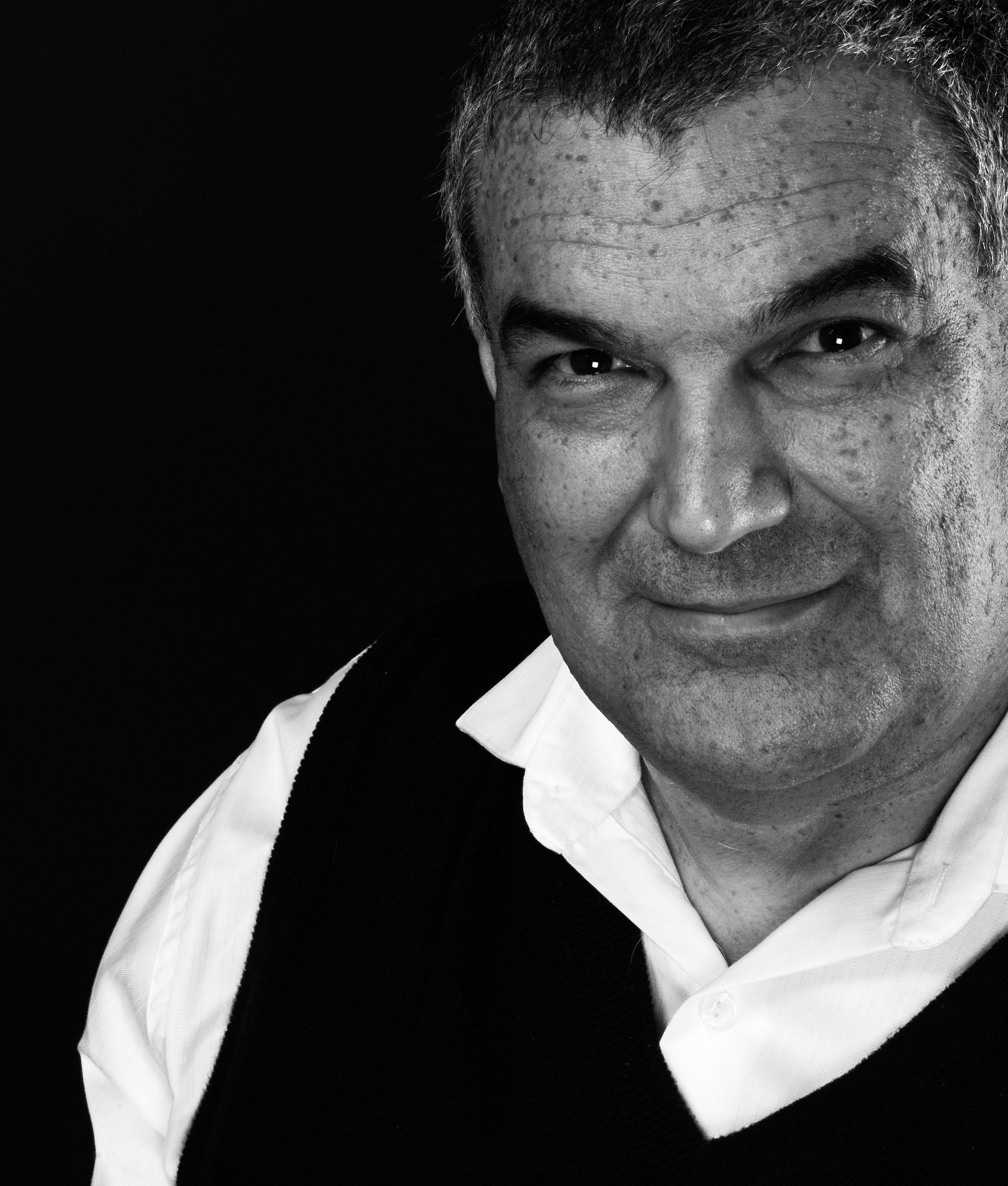

Background information
- Born: October 20, 1955 (age 71); Haifa, Israel
- Occupation: Composer
- Instrument: Piano
- Years active: 1978-present
- Website: www.oferbenamots.com

Ofer Ben-Amots (Hebrew: עופר בן-אמוץ; born October 20, 1955) is an Israeli-American composer and teacher of music composition and theory at Colorado College. His music is inspired by Jewish folklore of Eastern-European Yiddish and Judeo-Spanish Ladino traditions. The interweaving of folk elements with contemporary textures creates the dynamic tension that permeates and defines Ben-Amots' musical language.

== Biography ==
Born in Haifa, Israel, Ofer Ben-Amots gave his first piano concert at age nine and at age sixteen was awarded first prize in the Chet Piano Competition. Ben-Amots would attend the Rubin Academy of Music at Tel Aviv University from 1978 to 1979, where he pursued undergraduate studies in composition and theory with Josef Dorfman, piano with Alexander Volkov, and percussion with Gideon Steiner. Soon after, Ben-Amots was invited to study at the Conservatoire de Musique in Geneva, Switzerland. There he studied composition with Pierre Wismer, and privately with Alberto Ginastera. In 1980, Ben-Amots would begin attending Hochschule für Musik in Detmold, Germany, where he would receive degrees in composition, music theory, and piano upon his graduation in 1986. Following his arrival in the United States in 1987, Ben-Amots studied at the University of Pennsylvania. During his time at Penn, he studied composition under George Crumb and Richard Wernick. He also studied music theory under Leonard B. Meyer. In 1989, Ben-Amots received acclaim by winning First Prize at the Kavannagh Composers Competition for his piece Fanfare. He continued to achieve recognition in 1991, receiving several awards: First Prize at the 1991 Kobe International Competition for Flute Composition in Japan for Avis Urbanus, which features amplified flute (and would become a required composition at the 1993 Kobe Flute Competition); First Place and Gold Certification at the Roodepoort International Competition in South Africa for Three Love Songs for mixed choir; Finalist in the International Contest “Cuidad Ibagué” in Colombia for Psalm 42. That same year, he was awarded a Creative Artists Fellowship from the Center for Jewish Culture and Creativity and served as a Mishkenot Scholar-in-Residence in Jerusalem. Ben-Amots earned his Ph.D. in Music Composition in May 1993, after completing his M.A. at Penn in December 1990.

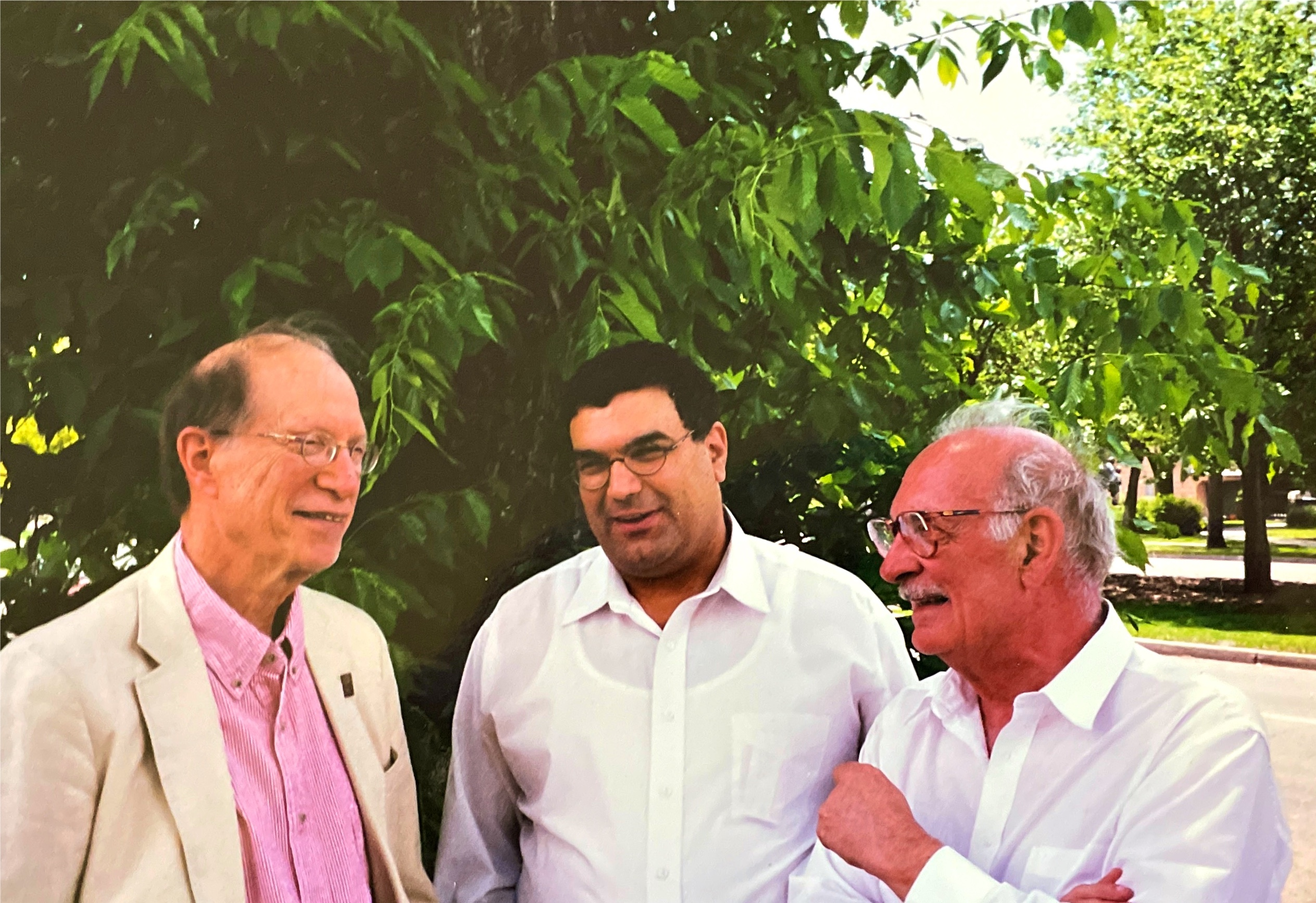
Ofer Ben-Amots with Carlton Gamer and George Crumb

Ofer Ben-Amots was the winner of the 1994 Vienna International Competition for Composers with his comic opera, Fool's Paradise (opera). The chamber opera is based on a short story by Isaac Bashevis Singer. Fool's Paradise was premiered in Vienna and subsequently became part of the 1994/95 season of Opernhaus Zürich.

In 1999, Ben-Amots was awarded the Aaron Copland Award and the Music Composition Artist Fellowship by the Colorado Council on the Arts, and would receive a Fulbright Fellowship in 2000, which permitted him to pursue compositional studies at the University of Hradec Králové in the Czech Republic. In 2001, he was selected for the “Mishkan Omanim” Artist Residency in Herzliya, Israel, and in 2003, Ben-Amots was the recipient Honorary Medal from the University of Hradec Králové. The next year, Ben-Amots won First Prize at Festiladino, an international Judeo-Spanish song competition held during the Israel Festival. His opera "The Dybbuk" received the Memorial Foundation for Jewish Culture Award in 2007. The following year, he was honored with the Colorado State Music Teachers Association (CSMTA) Commissioned Composer Award. In 2009, he received a Fulbright Senior Fellowship, returning to the University of Hradec Králové for advanced research. His orchestral work earned 2nd Place in The American Prize National Composers Contest (Orchestra Division) in 2013. He later won First Prize at the Smareglia International Composition Competition in Udine, Italy, in 2015. In 2019, Ben-Amots won First Prize at the SMP Press Composition Competition with The Klezmer Concerto, and most recently received two Silver Medals for the Global Music Awards for Music Without Borders in 2023.

Ofer Ben-Amots has been a faculty member of the Music Department at Colorado College since 1994. He was appointed Professor of Music in 2008 and has served as a Professor of music composition and theory. Over the years, he has held several distinguished professorships, including:

- John D. and Catherine T. MacArthur Distinguished Chair (1997–1999)
- Crown Family Professor for Innovation in the Arts (2011–2014)
- Christine S. Johnson Professor in Music (2016–2018)

Prior to his tenure at Colorado College, Ben-Amots served as a lecturer at University of the Arts, University of Pennsylvania, and Rutgers University.

Ben-Amots is a co-founder and the director of the International Summer Academy of Music. In addition, he is a member of the Advisory Board and the Editorial Board of the Milken Archive of American-Jewish Music and is a Jerusalem Fellow of the Center for Jewish Culture and Creativity. In 1997, he became the Center for Jewish Culture and Creativity's Artistic Director for North America.

Ben-Amots' music has been published by Kallisti Music Press, Muramatsu Inc., Dorn, Tara Publications, and the Composer's Own Press. It can be heard on Naxos Records, Vantage, Plæne, Stylton, and Music Sources recording labels.

In 2023, the National Library of Israel created the Ben-Amots Archive, a collection spanning 40 years of creative activities. The Archive comprises over 1300 documents, including scores and manuscripts, articles, letter, reviews, video, audio recordings, and more. It is stored at the National Library in Jerusalem.

== Discography ==
- Transcontinental: Music Without Borders (2023)
- Four Song Cycles by Ofer Ben-Amots (2019)
- Montage Music (2018)
- Tango for the Road (2017)
- this side up (2014)
- Return (2010)
- Te Laudamus (2007)
- Celestial Dialogues (2004)
- Psalm 81 (1998)
- Armenian Suite (1996)
- Kaddish’ Lament (1995)
- The Voice of America

== Compositions ==
=== Stage music ===
- Pierrot, ballet Suite for symphony orchestra. 1981 (50')
- Story Number 2, for small orchestra and Narrator Text written by Eugène Ionesco.1983/88 (13')
- Fool's Paradise, opera buffa in five scenes. Based on a story by Isaac Bashevis Singer. 1993-94 (80')
- The Dybbuk: Between Two Worlds, multimedia chamber opera in three acts. 2007 (90')

=== Voice and orchestra ===
- Shirat Israel, cantata for mezzo-soprano and orchestra. Hebrew text by Ch. N. Bialik. 1978 (12')
- The Joyce Cycle, for middle voice and symphony orchestra Lyrics written by James Joyce. 1984-85 (25')
- Celestial Dialogues, for voice, clarinet and string orchestra. 1994 (30')
- The Dybbuk Suite, for chamber symphony and a solo vocalist. 2002 (17')
- Kantes del Verdgel de Granadas (Songs from the Pomegranate Garden), a Judeo-Spanish cycle for chamber symphony and a mezzo-soprano. 2004/05 (22')

=== Orchestra music ===
- Fanfare for Orchestra, for symphony orchestra, Kavannagh Prize Awarded. 1988 (6')
- Variations on a French Children's Song, for symphony orchestra. 1992 (7')
- Mt. Fuji Ceremonial Fanfare, for symphonic band. 1996 (10')
- The Klezmer Concerto, for clarinet solo, string orchestra, harp and percussion. 2006 (25')
- Concertino - From Darkness to Light, for clarinet, mandolin, and orchestra. 2012 (24')
- Enchanted Landscape - for symphony orchestra. Commissioned by the Colorado Springs Philharmonic Orchestra, 2016 (12')

=== Symphonic / Brass band music ===
- Mt. Fuji Ceremonial Fanfare, for symphonic band. 1996 (10')
- The Maccabiah Fanfare, for brass ensemble, timpani, and percussion. 2010 (4')
- The Queen City Fanfare (Inaugural Fanfare), for brass choir. 2002 (5')

=== Choir and instruments ===
- Al Naharot Bavel (By the Rivers of Babylon), four part canon for mixed choir, Piano and Percussion Text Psalm 137. 1988 (4')
- Psalm 81 (Upon Gitith), for mixed choir and Metal Percussion. Text: Psalm 81. 1989 (13')
- Hashkivenu (Cause us, Oh God to Lie Down in Peace), for SATB Chorus, organ and mixed percussion. 1989/90 (8')
- Three Love Songs, for Mixed Choir and Piano Accompaniment. 1991 (5')
- Mizmor – Ten Degrees of Praise (Psalm 150), for soprano solo, clarinet, men's choir, and percussion. 2003 (11')
- The Heart and the Fountain, for SATB Chorus or for Female chorus with misc. percussion. 2006 (8'30")
- A Fool's Errand, for 8-Part mixed chorus, piano and percussion Lyrics written by Süsskind von Trimberg (13th century) 1996, Rev. 2008 (12')
- Hanukkah Songs, for Children’s Choir with piano accompaniment

=== Choir a cappella ===
- Hineh Al Heharim (Here on the Mountains), four to eight part canon for mixed choir a cappella. Text: Nachum 2, 1-3. 1987 (4'30")
- Ma Tishtochachi Nafshi (Why So Downcast, My Soul), - for mixed chorus. Text: Psalm 42. 1987/88 (5'30")
- Yeeheyu Le'ratzon (May the Words), for SATB Chorus. Text out of the Amidah prayer. 1989/90 (5')
- Five Hassidic Songs, for SATB Chorus or Female chorus. Arrangements of traditional Hassidic songs with or without piano accompaniment. 1999/2000 (10')
- Yesusum, Yesusum (The Desert Will Blossom), an arrangement for SATB Chorus, or SSAA Chorus. 2011 (3'15")
- Eliyahu Hanavi (Elija the Prophet) – an arrangement for SATB Chorus, or 3-part Men’s Chorus. 2023 (2'15")

=== Vocal chamber music ===
- The Joyce Cycle, for middle voice and symphony orchestra Lyrics written by James Joyce. 1984-85 (25')
- Shtetl Songs, for voice and piano (also a version for mixed chorus) 1985/86 (18')
- Psalm 23, for Soprano, Clarinet and Percussion. 1990 (5')
- Kinah (Lament), for piano and high-voice 1998 (8')
- Kantes del Verdgel de Granadas (Songs from the Pomegranate Garden), for voice and piano. Based on Judeo-Spanish songs. 2004 (20')
- Kantigas Ulvidadas (Judeo-Spanish), for voice and piano. 2006 (10')
- The Dybbuk Song Cycle, for voice and piano. Based on the opera. 2008 (25')
- The Sweet Pain of Love, for violin and voice, to a poem by Nathan Zach. 2008 (9')
- Re'i Adama for voice & Piano. Hebrew Text by Shaul Tchernichovsky. 2025 (4'30")

=== Instrumental chamber music ===
- Ceremonial Music, for saxophone, trumpet and piano. 1982 (11')
- Hashkivenu, for string quartet. 1982 (10')
- Sonata, for cello and piano. 1982 (23')
- Five Ancient Dances, for clarinet (or flute) and piano. 1983 (13')
- Midnight Dance, for violin (or cello) and piano. 1996 (8')
- Cantillations, for clarinet and cello (or viola) 1997 (10')
- Prophetic Tropes, (Te'amey Nevu'ah,) for trombone (or bass trombone) and extended piano. 1989/99 (11')
- Elemental Drums, Music for Dance. for mixed wind ensemble, 3 percussionists, and guitar. 1997 (12')
- The Queen City Fanfare, for trumpet and organ (version for solo trumpet and brass choir) 2002 (5')
- The Queen City Fanfare, (Inaugural Fanfare,) an additional version for oboe, piano, and percussion. 2002 (5')
- The Odessa Trio (in memory of J. Dorfman,) for violin, cello and piano. 2008-2014 (25')
- The Inauguration Fanfare for two trumpets, organ, and percussion. 2012 (10')
- From Darkness to Light, A trio for clarinet (or guitar,) mandolin, and piano. 2013 (24')
- The Curved Road for fl., cl., bn., vln., vla., vlc., and pno. 2015 (7' 30")
- Bulgariana, for violin and piano. 2016 (7')
- Montage Music, for clarinet violin, cello, and piano. 2017 (28')
- Nigun and Hora, for cello and piano. 2018 (10')
- Echoes of Wilderness, for wind quintet and percussion. 2022 (18')
- Jubilation: The Inaugural Fanfare, for trumpet, baritone saxophone, and piano. 2022 (5')
- ColoraDuo, Canzonetta for two clarinets. 2023 (9')
- Music for Brass Trio, for trumpet, Fr. horn, and trombone. 2024 (18')

=== Piano and organ solo ===
- Toccata 1978
- Scherzo 1978
- Etude in C 1984
- Praeludium and Fuga in C 1984
- Piano Pieces for Children 1983/89
- Sonatina 1984
  – Praeludium
  – Midnight Dance
  – Mosquito
  – Tambourine
- Haunted Toccata 1990
- Untitled No. 1 1990
- Akëda, 2000 (8')
- The Organ Book of Psalms, for organ solo 1998/2008
  – Mystical Procession 1999 (5')
  – Pastoral Invocation 1998 (7')
  – The Q Anthem 1999 (5')
  – Teru'ah (Recessional) 2008 (5')
- Echi di Pace e Libertá (Echos of Peace and Liberty) – for trumpet (or Fr. horn) solo. 2018 (10')
- To the Mountaintop, for piano solo. 2020 (7')
- La Serena (The Mermaid), for piano solo. 2020 (7')
- The Butterfly Effect, for piano solo. 2021 (11')
- The Little Klezmer Book, for piano solo, 18 Jewish and Hebrew easy arrangements for young pianists.
- Sippur (A Tale), for piano solo. 2024 (4')
- The Leprechaun’s Dance, for piano solo. 2024 (3'30")
- Echi di Pace e Libertá (Echos of Peace and Liberty) version for Fr. horn solo. 2024 (10')

=== Other solo instruments ===
- Miniatures et Collage, for flute. 1977 (5'30")
- Avis Urbanus, for amplified flute. 1990 (10')
- I, Jerusalem ..., for any size clarinet solo. 1991 (4')
- A Letter to Avigdor, for violin solo. Commissioned by Avigdor Zamir. 1990/99 (10')
- The Angel's Lament, for clarinet solo. Commissioned by Guido Arbonelli. 1999 (60")
- The Red Curtain Dance, for oboe or clarinet solo. 2003 (6')

=== Orchestral arrangements ===
- Armenian Suite, by Richard Yardumian. A reduction of the original score, for small symphonic orchestra. 1992
- Massada, - Opera in three acts by Fredrick Kaufman. A piano reduction of the original score. 1990

== Related Media ==
- Official Website
- A Dialogue with Ofer Ben-Amots
- Fool's Paradise - Official Website
- Ofer Ben-Amots on Youtube
- Jewish Art Song in America - A Composer's Perspective
- The Klezmer Concerto, Pastoral Doyna (1st Movement) composed by Ofer Ben Amots. Performed by the Herzliya Chamber Orchestra. Israeli Premiere 2006.
- Akeda by Ofer Ben Amots (Performed by Susan Grace)
- Butterfly Effect by Ofer Ben-Amots
- The Jubilation Fanfare by Ofer Ben-Amots
- Two Shtetl Songs by Ofer Ben-Amots (Performed by Ido Ariel and Iris Malkin)
- Celestial Dialogues by Ofer Ben-Amots
- Der Dibbuk Act 1 by Ofer Ben-Amots
- Der Dibbuk Act 2 by Ofer Ben-Amots
- Ofer Ben-Amots - The Odessa Trio
- Ofer Ben-Amots Spotlight - Milken Archive
- Yiddish Humor in Opera, on Ofer Ben-Amots' Fool's Paradise - YIVO
- The Dybbuk by Ofer Ben-Amots - YIVO
