= Yisroel Nekrasov =

Russian translator from Yiddish and poet (born 1970)

Yisroel Nekrasov (Russian: Исроэл Некрасов, birth name: Russian: Сергей Некрасов, romanized: Sergey Nekrasov) (born 1970) is a Russian translator from Yiddish and former teacher of Yiddish and Jewish literature at the Yiddish Language and Literature at the St. Petersburg Institute of Jewish Studies, St. Petersburg.

== Works ==
- 2016: אָפּגעברענטע שטעט, Opgebrente shtet, 'Burned-Down Cities', a collection of poetry

=== Translations ===
- 2009:Isaac Bashevis Singer, Russian: Сатана в Горае (Satan in Goray, Yiddish: דער שטן אין גאריי, romanized: Der sotn in Goray)
- 2015: Isaac Bashevis Singer, Yiddish: דער הויף, romanized: Der Hoyf, Nekrasov translated in as a single novel, titled Russian: Поместье, romanized: Pomestye, lit. 'Estate', in two volumes, which was translated into English as two independent books, The Manor (1967) and The Estate (1969). He agrued that splitting the original into two different titles is confusing to the readers, by apparently breaking the continuity of the narrative.
- 2016: Israel Joshua Singer, На чужой земле [In the Alien Land], short story collection
- 2022, Avrom Reyzen, Такие люди были раньше, short story collection (Note: "Опытная невеста" [An Experienced Bride], a story from Такие люди были раньше)
- 2023: Yehoshua Perle, Евреи как евреи. Книга об исчезнувшей жизни (Note: Евреи как евреи) ( Yiddish: ייִדן פֿון אַ גאַנץ יאָר, romanized: Yidn fun a gants yor, lit. 'Jews for a whole year', (Note: Yidn fun a gants yor) translated in English as Everyday Jews (Note: Everyday Jews, Chapter One)
