= The Penitent =

The Penitent or Penitent may refer to:

- The Penitent (novel), a 1983 novel by Isaac Bashevis Singer
- The Penitent (play), a 2017 off-Broadway play by David Mamet
- The Penitent (film), a 1988 American-Mexican film
- Penitent Peak, Graham Land, Antarctica

== See also ==
- St Pelagia the Penitent, 4th or 5th century Christian saint and hermit
- Theophilus the Penitent (died c. 538), Catholic cleric, inspiration for the Faust legend
- Penitente (disambiguation)
