= Fool's Paradise (opera) =

Fool's Paradise is a chamber opera for children in one act composed by Ofer Ben-Amots with a libretto by the composer based on the short story of the same name by Isaac Bashevis Singer. Though short, the story includes a rich scope of important life experiences such as childhood and adolescence, love, death, resurrection. Ben-Amots did not write the opera with a traditional adult audience in mind. Instead, he looked to inspire and excite children's imaginations. To do so, he argues, one must use "clear simple language and allow for some mystery and magic". To allow for such mystery and magic, Ben-Amots assigned one instrument or group of instruments to each of the seven characters in the opera. However, the instrumentation and story can be appreciated, admired, and enjoyed by adults as well. Because there is such a wide range of instruments used for this opera, a regular symphonic orchestra is not needed. Thus, it is up to the soloist to portray important feelings as well as demonstrate the ability of their instrument. Finally, the message of the story is simply that life is always better than death—that Paradise exists only on earth. Ben-Amots argues that this is an important lesson for both children and adults. The opera premiered at the Odeon theatre in Vienna in November 1994.

== Roles ==
Role	Voice type
Atzel	tenor
Nanny	mezzo-soprano
Aksah (the bride)	soprano
Kadish (the father)	baritone
Mother	mezzo-soprano
Dr. Yoetz	baritone
The Angel Michah	bass
Chorus of Angels	SATB
Quartet of Angels	2 sopranos, alto, tenor
Dancers/Servants/Angels etc.	silent

== Synopsis ==
=== Scene 1 ===
The scene opens with Atzel appearing as a child at bedtime. He begs Nanny to tell him his favorite story-the story of Paradise. Nanny describes a place where nobody works or strains and everybody enjoys luxuries usually reserved for the righteous. Atzel drifts to sleep, barely heeding her warning that only the dead can reach Paradise.

=== Scene 2 ===
Atzel, now eighteen years old, and his father Kadish are laboring. Atzel, who is due to marry the beautiful Aksah, is starting to feel resentment towards the hard work inherent in the adult life that lies before him. He reminisces about childhood and dreams of Paradise. He realizes Paradise could be the solution to his problems. Imagining that he has died, he announces to his loved ones that a funeral should be planned, as he is on his way to Paradise. Kadish laments for his son.

=== Scene 3 ===
Atzel's parents, distraught, seek council with Doctor Yoetz. The Doctor asks for eight days to cure Atzel. His plan is to ensure Atzel be careful what he wish for by burying the young man. Both scared and hopeful, the parents agree to the remedy. A funeral is held.

=== Scene 4 ===
Atzel's room is arranged to look like Paradise: windows shuttered, draperies tightly drawn, and candle burning day and night, with servants dressed up and playing the roles of angels. Atzel is delighted by Angels who bring him cakes and ripe fruits. However, he begins to grow restless, desiring to get out of bed and use his body. The Angels remind him that in Paradise one need only relax and enjoy oneself. Atzel finds that this place is also burdened by routine and boredom. Resentful, he wishes he were alive and longs to leave Paraside. On the eighth day, the chief of the Angel servants declare him unready for their world and announce his return to life.

=== Scene 5 ===
A blindfolded Atzel is led through the halls of his massive home and is welcomed back to life by his family along with his fiancé Aksah. He has realized his love for life. A celebration ensues at the wedding of Atzel and Aksah.

== Awards ==
Fool's Paradise received the winning prize in the Vienna Modern composition competition in 1994.
