= Shosha (novel) =

Novel by Isaac Bashevis Singer

- First English edition
- Author: Isaac Bashevis Singer
- Original title: Shosha
- Cover artist: Muriel Nasser
- Language: Yiddish
- Publisher: Farrar Straus Giroux
- Publication date: 1978
- Publication place: United States
- Pages: 277
- ISBN: 0-374-26336-1

Shosha is a novel by Nobel Prize winning author Isaac Bashevis Singer. The original Yiddish version appeared in 1974 in the Jewish Daily Forward under the title Soul Expeditions, while the English translation was published in 1978.

== Plot summary ==
The main character is aspiring author Aaron Greidinger who lives in the Hasidic quarter of the Jewish neighborhood of Warsaw during the 1930s.

"I was an anachronism in every way, but I didn't know it, just as I didn't know that my friendship with Shosha [..] had anything to do with love."

Aaron had many love affairs with women, but the only woman he truly loved was Shosha, his childhood friend. Shosha was struck by a sleeping disease and had since barely grown physically and was intellectually disabled.

Hitler is in power in Germany and is set to annihilate the Jews in Poland while in Russia, Stalin rules with his deadly terror, so the only voluntary exit that many of the characters in Shosha perceive for themselves is suicide. Although Aaron is offered the opportunity to leave the threat of death, he turns down the chance to escape, for his love for Shosha and chooses to stay in Poland.

The epilogue of Shosha is an abrupt fast-forward from before the outbreak of the Second World War in Poland to the early fifties. It takes place thirteen years after the last chapter, when Aaron meets Haiml Chentshiner in Israel. The epilogue is a concise dialogue in which each recounts the death of their friends. Shosha, Bashele, Moishe, Betty, Celia, and Aaron's mother have all died.

== Sequel ==
Singer's tragicomic novel Meshugah sets Aaron Greidinger in New York of 1950s.
