= The Klezmer Concerto =

Musical piece by Ofer Ben-Amots

The Klezmer Concerto is a piece for solo clarinet, harp, strings and percussion by Israeli-American composer Ofer Ben-Amots. The piece was both written for and dedicated to renowned klezmer clarinetist David Krakauer. The three-movement composition is marked by traditional klezmer sonorities and the use of extended techniques in the clarinet part. The Klezmer Concerto premiered in Michelstadt, Germany on July 15, 2006 as part of the Michelstadt Musiknacht 2006.

== Composition ==
The piece was composed in 2006. Amots states that the concerto was directly inspired by Krakauer's distinct playing style for klezmer clarinet; Amots and Krakuaer worked together throughout the composition process, with Krakauer's techniques influencing the composition from its earliest sketches.

== Movements ==
=== I. Pastoral Donya ===
The concerto opens with a slow movement titled Pastoral Donya. A Donya is a type of melancholic melody likely of Eastern-European origin. The strings open with a passage meant to imitate the sounds of nature. The clarinet appears over the accompaniment with shout and cry-like melodies.

=== II. Nigun of the Seven Circles ===
This dance-like movement is based on the Jewish wedding tradition of a bride circling her bridegroom seven times before the marriage ceremony can actually begin. Towards the end there is a free cadenza for the clarinet to improvise and expand upon previously stated motives.

=== III. Halleluya ===
The third movement was inspired by a passage describing a raucous musical scene in the 150th Psalm of the first testament. This movement also features a cadenza for the clarinet in a perpetual motion style. The movement concludes with the orchestra joining in the winding fashion, suggesting the praise of a Halleluya.
