= Penitente =

Penitente or penitentes may refer to

- Penitente or penitent, any (typically Catholic) practitioner of ritual penance
  - A member of the Penitentes (New Mexico), a lay confraternity of Catholic men
  - A member of any historical penitent order
- Penitente (snow formation), high-altitude snow formations
- Los Penitentes (Argentina), a ski resort
- The Penitentes, a lost 1915 silent film drama

== See also ==
- The Penitent (disambiguation)
