= The Dance of the Demons =

Polish novel

The Dance of the Demons (Yiddish: Der Sheydim-Tants) was the debut novel of Esther Kreitman. Originally published in Poland in 1936, the novel was later translated into English by Kreitman's son, Maurice Carr, as Deborah. Since then the novel has gone in and out of print in English, sometimes under the more accurate title The Dance of the Demons.

The novel is a semi-autobiographical account of a young Polish girl, Deborah, who grows up in a rabbinical household but is denied scholarly education despite her intelligence and willingness to learn.
