= Shadows on the Hudson =

Novel by Isaac Bashevis Singer

- First English edition (publ. 1998 Farrar Straus Giroux)
- Author: Isaac Bashevis Singer
- Language: Yiddish
- Publication date: 1998
- Publication place: United States
- Media type: Print

Shadows on the Hudson (original title Shotns baym Hodson ) is a novel by Isaac Bashevis Singer. First serialized in The Forward, a Yiddish newspaper, it was published in book form in 1957. It was translated into English by Joseph Sherman in 1997. As a result, Singer did not edit the English translation, as he did with most of his other translated novels. The book follows a group of prosperous Jewish refugees in New York City following World War II, just prior to the founding of the state of Israel. Singer described the novel as the story of group of refugees whose "minds and spirits are still in the old country, although, at the same time they take roots here in New York". Unlike many of Singer's earlier works which are set in Europe, the book takes place entirely in America.

== Plot ==
The novel contains multiple interwoven plot lines involving many different characters, all of whom are Jewish survivors of the Holocaust who have settled in postwar New York.

Singer focuses his attention primarily on two protagonists: the businessman Boris Makaver, now in his sixties, perhaps uneducated but devoted to the Torah; and Hertz Dovid Grein, no longer young, married with two children, but a womanizer and agnostic who has renounced his Jewish roots to the point of leaving his wife Leah for the much younger Anna, Makaver's daughter, who is also already married.

Hertz live events that will cause him to radically change his outlook on life, to the point of prompting him to return to Palestine and live almost as a hermit. The other characters revolve around these two, sometimes as surreal and eccentric extras, sometimes as dispensers of wisdom. All of them, however, grapple with—and resolve, in their own way—the question of what it means to be Jewish survivors of the Holocaust and what significance a tradition overflowing with seemingly senseless rules in observance of the decrees of a God who "allowed" the deaths of millions of men, women, and children can still hold in a society like the United States's, which is essentially based on hedonism.
