= Irene Lieblich =

Polish-American painter

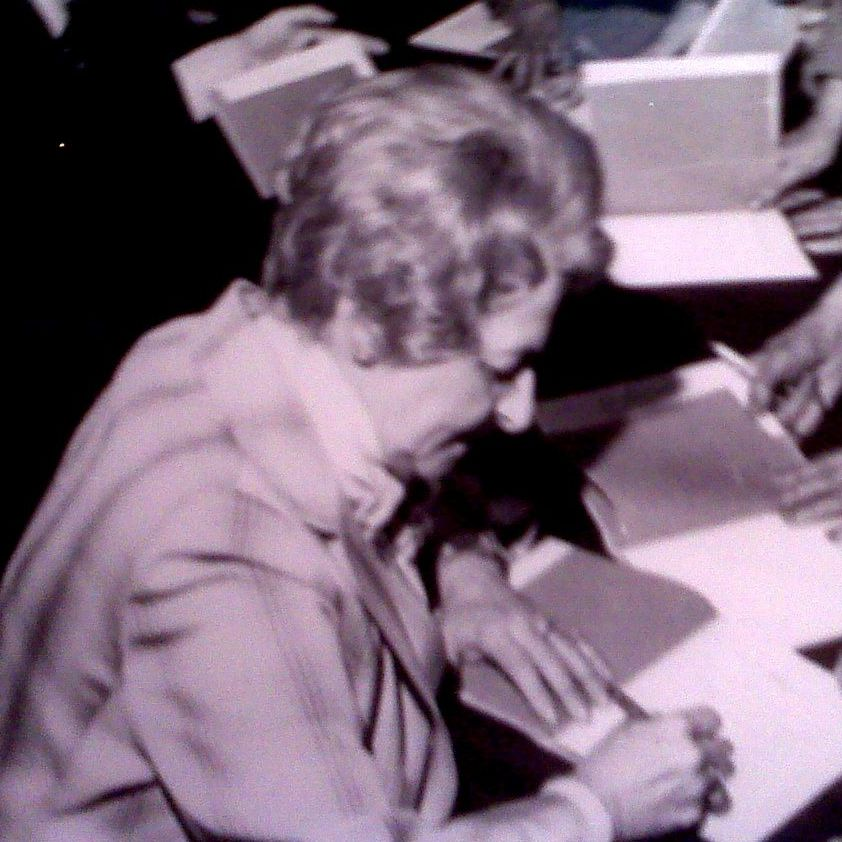
- Lieblich at book signing
- Born: Irene Wechter; 20 April 1923; Zamość, Poland
- Died: 28 December 2008 (aged 85); Miami, Florida, U.S.
- Occupations: Painter, artist
- Known for: The World of Isaac Bashevis Singer, Tree of Life, Spiritual Lights over Jerusalem, A Shtetl Wedding, Grandmother...Left Alone
- Spouse: Jakob Lieblich
- Children: 2

Irene Lieblich (20 April 1923 – 28 December 2008) was a Polish-born artist and Holocaust survivor noted for illustrating the books of Nobel laureate Isaac Bashevis Singer and for her paintings highlighting Jewish life and culture. She is also a distant cousin of noted Yiddish language author and playwright Isaac Leib Peretz.

== Early life ==
Irene Wechter was born on 20 April, the second night of Passover, in 1923 in Zamość, Poland. She was the daughter of Leon and Chana (née Brondwajn) Wechter in Zamość, Poland. Her father was in the medical profession. Her only sibling, a younger brother named Nathan, was murdered at age 13 during the Holocaust. Irene was a survivor of the Holocaust.

When asked about her experiences as a Holocaust survivor, Lieblich said:

I do not speak of my experiences during the Holocaust. I do not dwell on these moments. What we must remember are the Jewish souls that did not survive and this is what I am trying to do-- capture them to bring back their spirit. They have much to tell us and show us of their lives. Maybe beside[s] an artist, I am now also an historian.

== Personal life ==
She and Jakob Lieblich married in 1946 and emigrated from West Germany to Chicago, with their son Nathan in 1952. Daughter Mahli (née Molly) was born in Chicago, in 1953.

== Work ==
From 1955 to 1980, the family lived in Brooklyn, New York, where Irene wrote poetry to be published in Jewish periodicals, notably The Jewish Daily Forward, from the mid- to late 1960s to the early 1970s. In 1971, at the age of 48, Irene took up painting. She enrolled in art classes at the Brooklyn Museum of Art, where her instructors were impressed with her natural abilities. Encouraged by her professors, Irene began to exhibit her work in the New York area. She won first prize for painting at the Art Festival of the Farband in New York in 1972, only a year after she began to paint.

During 1973–74, her work remained on exhibition at Artists Equity in New York, where noted author and future Nobel laureate Isaac Bashevis Singer saw it. Singer insisted that his publishers hire Lieblich to illustrate his books for children, including A Tale of Three Wishes, and The Power of Light: Eight Stories for Hanukkah. Another work, Spiritual Lights over Jerusalem, was reproduced on greeting cards by the Women's Division of the Zionist Organization of America.

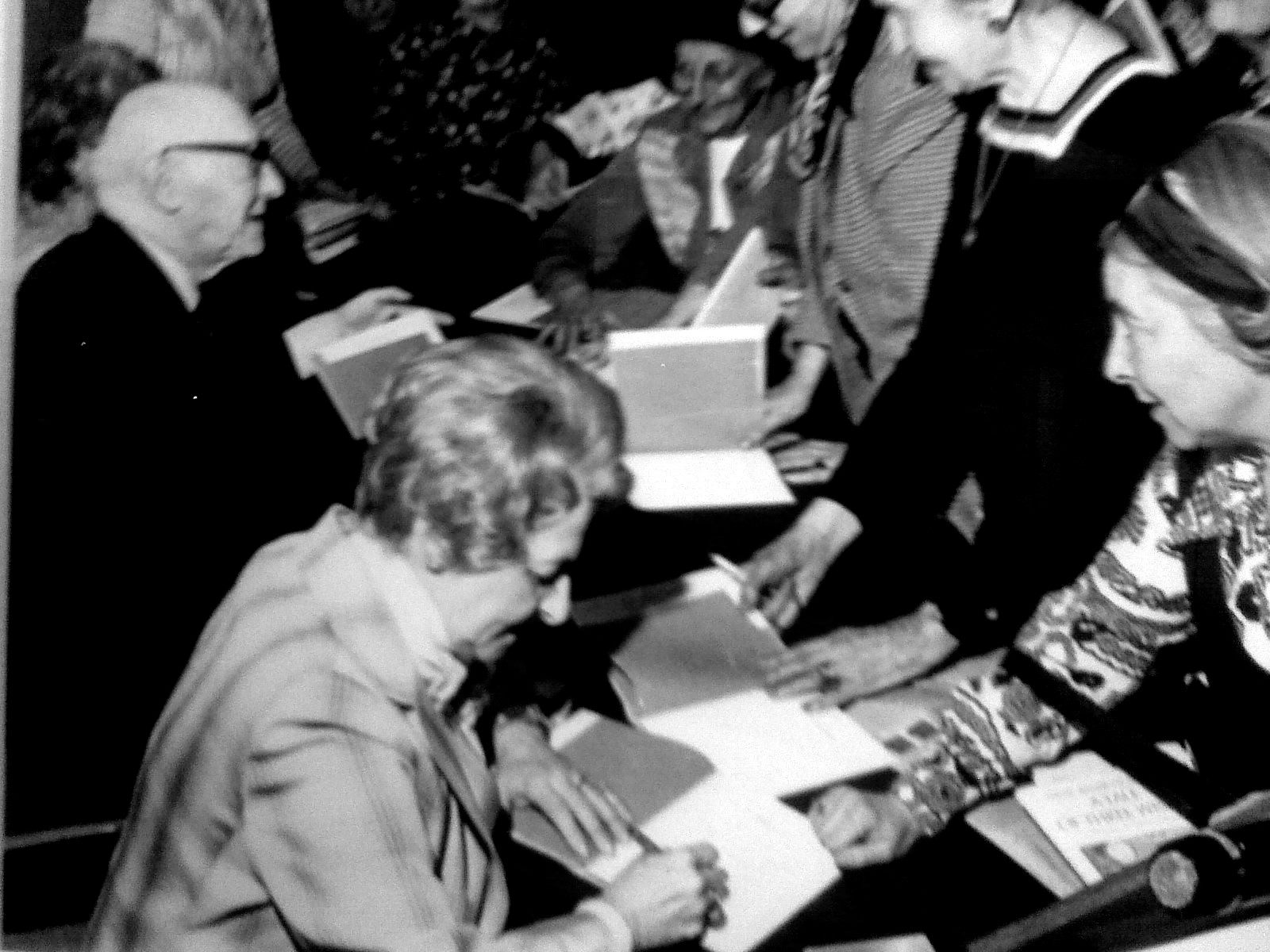
Lieblich signs autographs alongside Isaac Bashevis Singer

In 1980, she moved to Miami Beach, Florida, where she continued to draw and paint. In 1995, her works were featured in an exhibition titled Living Memories at the Fontainebleau Hilton, Miami Beach, held in conjunction with the last formal World Gathering of Holocaust Survivors.

Lieblich's works were shown at the National Yiddish Library Gallery in Amherst, Massachusetts as part of a 2004 exhibit celebrating the centenary of Isaac Bashevis Singer's birth. The Shtetl Museum at Rishon LeZion in Israel reproduced Lieblich's painting The World of Isaac Bashevis Singer on the poster it issued to commemorate its groundbreaking ceremony held there on 1 June 2003. A 2009-10 exhibition at Hebrew Union College - Jewish Institute of Religion Museum, New York, featured her work on the front cover of the catalogue.

Richard McBee wrote of one of Lieblich's illustrations depicting World War II Jewish Partisans celebrating the holiday of Hanukkah in a snow-filled forest while some keep an armed watch, "The simple composition slowly reveals first courageous piety, then childish playfulness and finally the deadly seriousness of their guards. Jewish faith at work."

== Relationship with Isaac Bashevis Singer ==
Of Singer, Lieblich once said, "My vocabulary is too limited to describe Mr. Singer's genius." Lieblich and Singer enjoyed a mutually beneficial relationship, as Lieblich's art illuminated the spirit of Singer's recollections of shtetl life and traditional Jewish values. Singer and Lieblich first met at the Artists Equity gallery on Broadway in 1973, where Lieblich's art was on display.

Lieblich recalled seeing a bent-over man who peered at her paintings and commented that he recognized the houses in them, certain that they depicted his own shtetl. Indeed, the painting in question did recreate a row of houses in Bilgoraj, the village in Poland where Singer grew up. This serendipitous encounter prompted Singer to ask Lieblich to illustrate one of his children's books, A Tale of Three Wishes.

== Awards and honors ==
- 1972: Won First Prize for painting at the Art Festival of the Farband in New York.
- 1973-1974: Exhibited at Artists Equity, New York, where Isaac Bashevis Singer encountered her work.
- 1995: Living Memories exhibition at the Fontainebleau Hilton, Miami Beach, in conjunction with the last formal World Gathering of Holocaust Survivors.
- 2004: National Yiddish Book Center in Amherst, Massachusetts, displays 20 of Lieblich's illustrations in celebration of the 100th anniversary of Isaac Bashevis Singer's birth.
- 2009: Hebrew Union College-Jewish Institute of Religion exhibition in New York City, New York.
- 2010: Exhibit at Skirball Cultural Center in Los Angeles, California.
- 2011: Exhibit at Eric Carle Museum of Picture Book Art, Amherst, Massachusetts.
