= Certified (disambiguation) =

Certified refers to the confirmation of certain characteristics of an object, person, or organization.

Certified may also refer

- Certified (Herb Robertson album), 1991
- Certified (David Banner album), 2005
- Certified (Lil' Flip & Gudda Gudda album), 2009
- Certified (Unladylike album), 2009
- "Certified" (song), a song by Glasses Malone
- "Certified", a song by Big Sean from the album Better Me Than You (2024)

== See also ==
- Certify (disambiguation)
- Certificate (disambiguation)
