= A Day of Pleasure =

1969 autobiographical book by Isaac Bashevis Singer

- First edition
- Author: Isaac Bashevis Singer
- Illustrator: Roman Vishniac (photos)
- Subject: War
- Published: 1969
- Publisher: Farrar, Straus and Giroux
- Media type: Print
- Pages: 227
- Awards: National Book Award for Children's Books (1970)
- ISBN: 0374416966

A Day of Pleasure: Stories of a Boy Growing up in Warsaw is an autobiographical account of a childhood in Warsaw, Poland, written by Isaac Bashevis Singer. Published in 1969, it is a series of 19 short stories written by Singer depicting his childhood growing up in the Jewish area of Warsaw. In each chapter, a different story is detailed, with a focus on specific people Singer encountered in his neighborhood during this period. The stories detail the conditions and emotions associated with daily life in the city, such as poverty, confusion, and even excitement during the pre-war era in the 1900s. It was selected by the American Library Association as a notable book in 1969 and won the National Book Award for Children's Books in 1970.

== Acclaim ==
- "This is a collection of 19 episodes from Singer's boyhood life on Krochmalna Street in Warsaw. "Singer has written an extraordinary book that will give many days of pleasure to adults as well as children. These are sensitive, youthful, and observant portraits of what Jewish life was like in Poland." - Publishers Weekly
- "Singer's memories of his youth in Poland make a powerful, brilliant children's book. The author lays out a panorama of Jewish life in the city-- the rabbis in black velvet and gabardine, the shopkeepers, the street urchins and schoolboys, the poverty, the confusion, the excitement of the prewar time. But even more, the author reveals himself; and the torments and mysteries that plagued him as a child will make his stories fascinating to other children....Reflecting a bygone world, the photographs add a further note of realism and power." - The Horn Book
- Judges from the National Book Award for Children's Literature: "At a time when in children's literature the power of the imagination is frequently lost sight of or diluted, it is fortunate that we can honor a great storyteller. Mr. Singer has created out of remembered fragments of his own childhood a place instantly familiar where life is not neat and orderly, where the adventures of a boy throw into sharp and recognizable focus those resistant elements of the ever-troubled human condition."
