= Certificate of Achievement =

Certificate of Achievement may refer to:

- Entry Level Certificate, a qualification in England, Wales and Northern Ireland, formerly known as the Certificate of Achievement
- National Certificate of Educational Achievement, a qualification in New Zealand
- Segrave Certificate of Achievement, a subsidiary award of the Segrave Trophy
