= Meshugah (novel) =

Novel by Isaac Bashevis Singer

Meshugah (Note: The Yiddish word meshugah, in various transcriptions, borrowed from Hebrew, means 'crazy', 'insane') is a tragicomic novel by Isaac Bashevis Singer translated by the author and Nili Wachtel from Yiddish and published posthumously in English in 1994. It was serialized in Yiddish under the title Lost Souls in The Forward during 1981-1983. Superficially, it is a love triangle story, but full of unexpected angles: tragic, comical, and philosophical.

Meshugah may be seen as a sequel to the 1978 novel Shosha, sharing the protagonist, Aaron Greidinger. Shosha is the story of Aaron in pre-World War II Warsaw, while Meshugah is set in New York of 1950s.

== Plot ==
It is the story of a writer from Warsaw, Aaron Greidinger, who emigrated to New York and spends time with other refugees and Holocaust-surviving intellectuals on the Upper West Side, including Max Aberdam, whom he had believed to be dead before meeting him at the newspaper where he writes. Max, married to a woman he detests, is in love with Miriam, who is much younger and also married. She, too, returns his feelings, but the two are unable to leave their respective spouses. Aaron also seems to be in love with Miriam, and she is attracted to him and encourages him professionally. Other characters include Stefa, Irka, and Tzlova (the first two whom Aaron once loved and the third whom he loves now) and Misha, an anarchist taxi driver. Max, Miriam, and Aaron later reunite in Tel Aviv, where Aaron is awarded a prestigious literary prize. There, Aaron asks Miriam to marry him.
