= The Magician of Lublin (film) =

1979 film by Menahem Golan

- VHS cover
- Directed by: Menahem Golan
- Screenplay by: Menahem Golan; Sheldon Patinkin; Irving S. White
- Based on: The Magician of Lublin by Isaac Bashevis Singer
- Produced by: Menahem Golan; Yoram Globus; Harry N. Blum
- Starring: Alan Arkin; Louise Fletcher; Shelley Winters
- Cinematography: David Gurfinkel
- Edited by: Dov Hoenig
- Music by: Dov Seltzer; Maurice Jarre
- Production company: Golan-Globus Productions
- Distributed by: Cannon Films
- Release date: October 1979 (Chicago)
- Running time: 114 minutes
- Countries: Israel; West Germany
- Languages: English; German
- Budget: $6 million

The Magician of Lublin is a 1979 drama film co-written and directed by Menahem Golan based on The Magician of Lublin by Isaac Bashevis Singer. The film's title song was performed by British singer Kate Bush.

== Plot ==
Yasha Mazur (Alan Arkin) is a turn-of-the-20th-century Jewish stage magician, womaniser, con man, and mystic. His ambition is to figure out how to fly. He tours the western reaches of the old Russian Empire. Yasha is married to Esther (Linda Bernstein), but he is rarely home in Lublin, and they have not been able to have any children. His mistresses include Zeftel (Valerie Perrine) and Magda (Maia Danziger), who tours and performs with him. The great loves of Yasha's life are the aristocratic but penurious widow Emilia (Louise Fletcher) and Emilia's daughter Halina (Lisa Whelchel) who he regards as his own daughter. Halina is ill and needs medical care, and Emilia knows Yasha will never be able to provide; so she must keep herself free to marry someone who can pay for the medical treatment her daughter needs.

Yasha's big break looms. He convinces his manager/impresario Wolsky (Lou Jacobi) that he can fly. Wolsky arranges for a booking at the prestigious Alhambra theatre in Warsaw. Yasha anticipates success, but Zeftel announces she is emigrating to America – to "Buenos Aires" – where a man has promised her work. Yasha knows that Buenos Aires is in Argentina, not America. He also knows that the man who is going to take her there is a pimp, who is selling her into sexual slavery. To save Zeftel, Yasha performs a special show of magic and card tricks for the pimp and gives him money.

The next morning, Yasha learns that Zeftel had lied to him, after he attempted and failed to burglarise the home of Count Zaruski to steal the money Emilia needs to take Halina to Italy for her cure, and so that Emilia will marry him instead of the Count. His attempt at burglary had failed because of a disturbing vision of violence. Yasha is emotionally fragile, knowing that he has lost Emilia and Halina, as well as his career. He returns to his rooms and discovers that Magda killed herself.

Fully broken, Yasha returns home to Esther. His mystic vision of death having come true, he encloses himself in a brick hut with only a window, through which to receive food and communicate with people as a holy man, dispensing wisdom and blessings. Wolsky arrives, having read in the Warsaw papers about the holy man of Lublin who lives in a grave. He has brought Emilia with him, who asks Yasha's forgiveness and asks him to pray for her. She is now the Countess Zaruski, and Halina is at least in a sanitorium in Italy receiving treatment.

Another visitor from away has also come. She is a widow, heavily veiled in black mourning, who has also heard of the holy man in the brick hut who spends his days in prayer and study of the Torah. She has come to seek his advice what to do: mourning the loss of her daughter who killed herself for love of a man, she cannot forgive the man. Suddenly she pulls back her veil and reveals that she is Elzbieta, come with Bolek and some friends to avenge Magda's death by killing Yasha. A battering ram is brought and attacks the brick hut repeatedly until its walls collapse and the hut is opened. Elzbieta and Bolek are ready to kill the man they blame for Magda's suicide. Yasha is not inside the brick. He is nowhere to be seen. All fall back dumbfounded by an apparent miracle, and then they see a skein of geese in the sky, and one goose in particular, chasing after it.

== Cast ==
Actor	Role
Alan Arkin	Yasha Mazur, a magician from Lublin
Linda Bernstein	Esther, Yasha's wife
Louise Fletcher	Emelia, an aristocratic but poor widow
Lisa Whelchel	Halina, her daughter
Elspeth March	Yadwiga, their servant
Valerie Perrine	Zeftel, one of Yasha's regular girlfriends, whose husband is in prison
Maia Danziger	Magda, Yasha's assistant and lover
Shelley Winters	Elzbieta, Magda's mother
Zachi Noy	Bolek, Magda's brother
Friedrich Schoenfelder	Count Zaruski
Shaike Ophir	Shmuel, a friend of Yasha at home
Lou Jacobi	Wolsky, theatre impresario and Yasha's manager
Warren Berlinger	Herman

== Reception ==
The film was a box office and critical failure. As an example, Time Out London wrote "Golan overdramatises, tips into hysteria, and substitutes a specious mysticism that is sadly literal."
