= The Penitent (novel) =

Novel by Isaac Bashevis Singer

- First English-language edition publ. Farrar, Straus, and Giroux
- Author: Isaac Bashevis Singer
- Language: Yiddish
- Publication date: 1983
- Publication place: United States
- Media type: Print

The Penitent (1983) is a novel by Isaac Bashevis Singer (1902–1991). It was originally published in installments in The Jewish Daily Forward (1973) with the Yiddish title of Der Baal Tshuve. The English translation was made by Joseph Singer for Farrar Straus & Giroux. It tells the story of Joseph Shapiro, emigrating from Poland in 1939 and from USSR in 1945 to the United States in 1947, where he becomes rich and involved with consumerism and lust, so that he decides to leave everything, including his job, his wife and his lover, and finally expatriate to Israel, where he wonders about the traditional values of Jewish culture.

== Plot ==
The narrator, Yosef Shapira, recounts his former life with loathing, denouncing the entire Western way of life, and describes his doubts and struggles during his process of repentance.

Shapira's story of repentance embodies typical characteristics of spiritual transformation: after immersing himself in the pursuit of wealth and carnal pleasures, the protagonist discovers one night that both his mistress and his wife are cheating on him. This double humiliation leads him to view the material world as a world of falsehood, and he decides to return to the heritage of his ancestors. He exchanges his vast wealth for traveler's checks and leaves his homeland for the wider world, leaving everything behind. This monologue encapsulates all the central themes typical in Bashevis Singer's work: faith in God, the quest for justice, and vegetarianism.

== Sources ==
- Review on The New York Times by Harold Bloom
