= The Manor (novel) =

1967 novel

- 1967 book cover
- Author: Isaac Bashevis Singer
- Original title: Der hoyf (דער הויף)
- Language: Yiddish
- Publisher: Forverts; Farrar, Straus and Giroux
- Publication date: 1953–1955
- Publication place: United States
- English publication date: 1967
- Followed by: The Estate

The Manor is a novel by Isaac Bashevis Singer. The book takes place in Poland after the Polish insurrection of 1863, and examines "the backwardness of Polish life at that time … [and] the conflict of old Jewish life and modern thought," according to Kirkus Reviews.

It was first published in serialized form in Yiddish by Forverts between 1953–1955, as a single work, Yiddish: דער הויף, romanized: Der Hoyf, with The Estate and then published in English by Farrar, Straus and Giroux in 1967.

in 2015, Yisroel Nekrasov translated the original Yiddish novel as a single one, titled Russian: Поместье, romanized: Pomestye, lit. 'Estate', in two volumes, arguing that splitting the original into two different titles is confusing to the readers, by apparently breaking the continuity of the narrative.
