= The Certificate (novel) =

Novel by Isaac Bashevis Singer

- The Certificate book cover
- Author: Isaac Bashevis Singer
- Language: Yiddish
- Publication date: 1992
- Publication place: United States
- Media type: Print

The Certificate is a novel by Isaac Bashevis Singer, published posthumously in English in 1992 (published in Yiddish in 1967). David Bendinger, a poor, young Yiddish writer wishes to emigrate to Palestine from Poland, and because married couples are given preference, he tries to arrange for a marriage certificate to be purchased for him by a wealthy woman whose fiancee lives in Palestine. The narrative deals with the abject poverty of David, as well as his Jewish heritage, and details the rise of both Communism and Zionism.

== Reception ==
Kirkus Reviews gave a positive review, describing the book as being made with "gusto and panache" and called it "a triumph". Publishers Weekly likewise gave a positive review, describing the book as "welcome addition to [Singer]'s oeuvre". Christopher Lehmann-Haupt, writing for the New York Times, gave a mixed review, writing "In the end you follow David Bendinger's adventures only halfway engaged...a certain detachment in Singer's prose always keeps you at arm's length."
