= The Estate (novel) =

Novel by Isaac Bashevis Singer

- First English edition publ. 1969 Farrar Straus Giroux
- Author: Isaac Bashevis Singer
- Language: Yiddish
- Publisher: Forverts; Farrar, Straus and Giroux
- Publication date: 1953-1955
- Publication place: United States
- English publication date: 1969
- Media type: Print

The Estate is a novel by Isaac Bashevis Singer. The story continues the narratives of The Manor in telling the history of late-19th century Polish Jews.

It was first published in serialized form in Yiddish by Forverts between 1953-1955, as a single work, Yiddish: דער הויף, romanized: Der Hoyf, with the earlier The Manor and then published in English by Farrar, Straus and Giroux in 1969.

in 2015, Yisroel Nekrasov translated the original Yiddish novel as a single one, titled Russian: Поместье, romanized: Pomestye, lit. 'Estate', in two volumes, arguing that splitting the original into two different titles is confusing to the readers, by apparently breaking the continuity of the narrative.

== Plot ==
The novel continues the saga of Calman Jacoby, the protagonist of The Manor, tracing the history of the Polish-Jewish community in the village of Jampol until nearly the end of the 19th century.

The protagonist is Ezriel Babad, Calman's son-in-law and the rabbi's son. Other important characters in the novel include Clara, Calman's second wife (who was herself previously divorced); Olga, Ezriel's converted lover; Sasha, the son of Calman and Clara; and Zipkin, Clara's lover who will emigrate with her to New York. The characters grapple with the tensions between loneliness and a sense of belonging, between irony and faith, and between the possibility of secularism and an inalienable Jewish identity.

== Reception ==
The novel was reviewed by Gerald Jonas for The New York Times. He praised it as a "sprawling chronicle" of Jewish life in Poland and noted the "richly detailed" portrayal of characters and community.
