= The Golem (Singer novel) =

Novel by Isaac Bashevis Singer

- First English edition publ. 1982 Farrar Straus Giroux
- Author: Isaac Bashevis Singer
- Language: Yiddish
- Publication date: 1969
- Publication place: United States
- Media type: Print

The Golem is a novel written by Isaac Bashevis Singer that is a traditional telling of the golem of Prague from Jewish folklore. The work was first published in the Yiddish language in 1969 in The Jewish Daily Forward. It was rewritten and translated into English in 1982.
