= The Family Moskat =

Novel by Isaac Bashevis Singer

- First edition (publ. Knopf)
- Author: Isaac Bashevis Singer
- Language: Yiddish
- Publication date: 1950
- Publication place: United States
- Media type: Print

The Family Moskat is a novel written by Isaac Bashevis Singer, originally written in Yiddish. It was Singer's first book published in English.

Singer became a literary contributor to The Jewish Daily Forward only after his older brother Israel died in 1944. That year, Singer started writing The Family Moskat in installments, and serialized in the Forward through 1945. The book was dedicated to the memory of his brother, Israel, who was previously the more famous of the brothers. Its publication in English in 1950 led to its author's breakthrough as a celebrated writer.

His own style showed in the daring turns of his action and characters, with double adultery during the holiest of nights of Judaism, the evening of Yom Kippur (despite being printed in a Jewish family newspaper in 1945). He was nearly forced to stop writing the novel by his editor-in-chief, Abraham Cahan, but was saved by readers who wanted the story to continue. After this, his stories—which he had published in Yiddish literary newspapers before—were printed in the Forward as well. Throughout the 1940s, Singer's reputation grew.

== Plot ==
=== Parts I-III ===
The Family Moskat centers around the progeny of the wealthy and patriarchal Meshulam Moskat (or Reb Meshulam) and their dealings with the main protagonist, the brilliant but unworldly Asa Hershel Bannet. It opens with Reb Meshulam's return to Warsaw after taking the waters at Karlsbad. Unbeknownst to his family, he had met and married his third wife, Rosa Frumetl, in Karlsbad and brought her and her daughter Adele back to Warsaw with him.

A few weeks later, Asa Heshel Bannet too arrives in Warsaw with little more than Spinoza's Ethics under his arm and a few rubles in his pocket. He is the son of the rabbi of the rural shtetl Tereshpol Minor and from a young age was considered a child prodigy, learned in the Talmudic commentaries and sure to inherit his grandfather's rabbinical chair. However, the curious youth soon turned astray and began reading modern philosophy and questioning his traditional upbringing. The village turned against him and he was forced to leave for Warsaw at the age of 19.

Through a series of coincidences, Asa Heshel soon ended up meeting Reb Meshulam's son-in-law Abram Shapiro, a gregarious and well-loved but undependable debtor. Abram Shapiro sets Asa Heshel up to rent a room from a family friend, and takes him to dinner at his brother-in-laws house. There Asa Heshel meets Abram Shapiro's niece, Hadassah Moskat, as well as Adele. Through Abram Shapiro's maneuvering, Hadassah agrees to tutor Asa Heshel in Polish and they start meeting weekly. Hadassah is betrothed to Fishel Kutner, the son of a wealthy merchant, but does not want to marry him. After Reb Meshulam tries to force the matter, Asa Heshel and Hadassah decide to run away to Switzerland by trying to sneak over the border. Upon hearing about this, Reb Meshulam falls gravely ill.

Asa Heshel makes it across the border, but Hadassah is caught, arrested, and returned home where she too falls ill. His family hangs around his deathbed, waiting to split the inheritance and attempt to wrestle whatever part of it they can from each other. Koppel, Reb Meshulam's bailiff, was made the executor and after finding the key to a safe full of money in the house he stuffs it all in a suitcase and steals it while the old man is still alive. Meanwhile, Asa Heshel writes to Adele asking for Abram's address and she, already secretly fancying him, starts a correspondence ending in her moving to Switzerland and marrying him, although Asa Heshel appears ambivalent and regretful about it when seen again returning to Warsaw. Hadassah, unable to attempt to meet up with Asa Heshel again, acquiesces to marriage with Fishel Kutner.

Reb Meshulam passes eventually passes, leaving his family to fight over the inheritance with Koppel coming out on top and resisting pressure to liquidate and distribute the assets.

=== Parts IV-VI ===
However, Asa Heshel eventually is able to make contact with Hadassah while in Switzerland and they begin an illicit correspondence, as each is now married to another person. Meanwhile, he refuses to accept any money from Adele to help support him, and begins planning to get back with Hadassah. He eventually returns to Warsaw, stopping off in Tereshpol Minor first, right as the winds of World War I begin to blow. Adele immediately bonds with Asa Heshel's mother and sister, and the two make their way to Warsaw.

Asa Heshel and Hadassah briefly and covertly reunite in Warsaw where they rent a room together, but meanwhile the First World War is crashing all around them. Asa Heshel attempts to divorce Adele, but she reveals to him that she is pregnant and refuses a divorce. Asa Heshel, refusing to physically maim himself to get out of being drafted, joins the army and is sent to the front lines. Meanwhile, confronted by the family, Koppel divorces his wife and marries Leah, Reb Meshulam's daughter, and moves to America. In his stead, Fishel Kutner takes over the family's finances.

=== Parts VII-VIII ===
Years after the end of the Great War and the Soviet Revolution, Asa Heshel finally makes his way back to Warsaw by train. Despite having been faithfully married for years in his absence, Hadassah decides to go with him, and they journey a while together. Despite the initial happiness of their reunion, Asa Heshel's deep and frequent bouts of depression, nihilism, and anger put an early cloud over their relationship. Meanwhile, the rest of the family deals with the deaths of the older generations and the decline of the Hasidic courts, as well as the slow but steady rise of antisemitism in Poland.

=== Parts IX-X ===
Hadassah and Asa Heshel have a child named Dacha in memory of Hadassah's mother, and Asa Heshel works as a teacher while continuing work on his writings on happiness, combining the ethics of Spinoza with modern science. However, they are not happy, with Asa Heshels small salary being constantly stretched to cover sicknesses and family. Abram Shapiro comes to them with a scheme for a pageant he is a judge of, and convinces them to join despite their financial woes with the assurances that he will get the prize for them. However, the pageant erupts in chaos as a stampede causes Hadassah to rip her dress, and Abram Shapiro later has a heart attack and dies.

Asa Heshel carries out an affair with a young communist named Barbara, leading to the eventual separation of him and Hadassah, who goes to live in the countryside with Dacha. Despite it now being on the eve of World War II and global tensions rising, the Moskat Family reunites, with Koppel's family coming from America and other branches coming from settlements in the land of Israel. However, just as the family gathers the war breaks out and chaos reigns. Hadassah and Dacha are killed in a bombing strike, and Asa Heshel flees with Barbara to Warsaw. The novel ends on the eve of the Shoah as the Nazis reach Warsaw, the survival of the shattered remnants of the family in doubt.
