= Certify Data Systems =

American healthcare information technology company

Certify Data Systems, Inc.
- Industry: Healthcare IT
- Founded: 2004
- Founder: Marc Willard
- Headquarters: United States

Certify Data Systems, Inc. founded in 2004, was a healthcare information technology (IT) company located in Campbell, California, that developed an interoperability platform to enable health information exchange (HIE) between healthcare entities, such as integrated health organizations, hospitals, multi-specialty centers, clinics, laboratories and physicians. The company was acquired by Humana Inc. (NYSE: HUM) in 2012. In March 2015, Certify Data Systems integrated with Anvita Health and enliven systems to form Transcend Insights, a population health management (PHM) technology company.

== History ==
In November 2012, Humana announced its acquisition of Certify Data Systems.

In March 2015, Humana announced the formation of Transcend Insights, a convergence of its three California-based subsidiaries: Certify Data Systems, Anvita Health and nliven systems. The merge brought together more than 30 years of collective experience in the healthcare IT space.

== Awards and Accolades ==
In August 2009, Certify Data Systems was selected as a semifinalist for the Adaptive Business Leaders Organization's Innovative Approach to the Delivery of Healthcare award.

In December 2009, Cerner Corporation signed an agreement with Certify Data Systems to resell Certify Data Systems' HealthDock appliance to supplement its Cerner Hub connectivity services.

In May 2012, Chilmark Research ranked Certify Data Systems as a "tier one enterprise HIE vendor" in the "2012 HIE Market Report: Analysis & Trends of the Health Information Exchange Market." A representative of Chilmark Research stated, "It is hard to find fault with this company. Certify Data Systems has a clear product vision for a novel, innovative HIE product portfolio and [their] HIE solution suite is elegant in its simplicity and ability to bring up an HIE quickly with deep integration to a wide range of ambulatory EHR solutions in the market."

In June 2012, Certify Data Systems ranked among top three private HIE Vendors In Black Book Market Research 2012 User Survey, recognized as one of the top three private HIE vendors according to the Black Book Healthcare Information 2012 Rankings. Certify was ranked third out of 20 top private Core HIE Systems vendors. In addition, the company ranked within the top 10 percent in a high majority of criteria used to judge vendors in this survey.
