= Satan in Goray =

Novel by Isaac Bashevis Singer

- First English edition (publ. Noonday Press, 1955)
- Author: Isaac Bashevis Singer
- Language: Yiddish
- Publication date: 1933
- Media type: Print

Satan in Goray (Yiddish: דער שטן אין גאָריי: אַ מעשה פון פארצייטנס, Yiddish translit.: Der sotn in Goray: a mayse fun fartsaytns; "Satan in Goray: A Tale of the Old Times") is a novel by Isaac Bashevis Singer. It was originally published between January and September 1933 in installments in the Yiddish literary magazine Globus in Poland and in 1935 it was printed as a book. It was Singer's first published novel.

== Plot ==
The novel describes a Jewish life in a Polish village of Goray after the massacres of the Cossack riots during the Khmelnitsky Uprising of 1648, which was influenced by the teachings of the false messiah Sabbatai Zevi in desperate hopes for messiah and redemption. The Jewry is split into two factions: traditionalists and Sabbateans. Eventually the news had come to Goray that Sabbatai Zevi converted to Islam. This was taken in Goray that the way to redemption is to embrace the evil. The strange rites culminate in the possession of one of Sabbatai's prophetesses with dybbuk. Since the Sabbatean's movement waned, a true believer in Torah came and exorcised the dybbuk. The last segment of the novel is stylized as a 17th century document about "the dybbuk of Goray".

== Discussion ==
Ken Frieden asserts that the novel "anticipates Singer’s later fascination with demons". Meyer Levin wrote that the novel is "folk material transmuted into literature" and praised the English translation.

Dar Williams' song "And a God Descended" (from The Green World album) uses imagery from the story to contemplate faith gone awry.

In her critique of Satan in Goray in the book Intercourse, Andrea Dworkin describes the character Rachel as a symbol of social pornography, where she becomes an object serving the needs of men. Dworkin argues that Rachel loses her personal identity and is sexually dominated by men, with no control over her body or desires. She show how society and religious systems justify her oppression, turning her into an instrument in the hands of men, emphasizing themes of sexual control and female subjugation. And when the dybbuk enters her, she becomes "a sexual monster, a gross caricature of a putative female sexuality".

== Translations ==
- The novel was translated into Hebrew by Mordechai Lipson at Dvir Publishing in 1953.
- The English translation (from Yiddish) was made by Jacob Sloan with the author's help and published by Noonday Press in 1955.
- The German translation was based on Sloan's English version by Ulla Hengst and printed by Rowohlt Verlag, 1969, ISBN 3-498-06073-2
- Hungarian: A sátán Gorajban translated by Ágnes Walkóné Békés, Európa, 1978, ISBN 963-07-1574-0
- Polish: Szatan w Goraju translated by Józef Marzęcki, Szymon Sal, 1992, ISBN 83-900392-5-7
- Czech: Satan v Goraji translated by Jan Skoumal, Argo, 2003
- Russian: "Сатана в Горае" translated by Yisroel Nekrasov, 2009
- Italian: "Satana a Goraj" translated by Elisabetta Zevi, Adelphi Edizioni, 2018.
