= The Magician of Lublin (novel) =

Novel by Isaac Bashevis Singer

- Cover of first edition (Noonday, 1960)
- Author: Isaac Bashevis Singer
- Original title: Der kuntsnmakher fun Lublin
- Translator: Elaine Gottlieb; Joseph Singer
- Language: Yiddish
- Published: 1971
- Publisher: Hamenorah; Noonday; Secker & Warburg
- English publication date: 1960
- Pages: 201

The Magician of Lublin (Yiddish: דער קונצנמאַכער פֿון לובלין, romanized: Der Kuntsnmakher fun Lublin) is a novel by Nobel Laureate Isaac Bashevis Singer. Originally written in Yiddish, it was first published in English in 1960 in the United States by Noonday, and in 1961 in the United Kingdom by Secker & Warburg. In 1971, the book was published in Yiddish by Hamenorah.

== Plot summary ==
The story is set in the mid-1880s in Russian-ruled Poland. The main character Yasha Mazur is a magician from Lublin, who travels around Poland to perform before audiences. He is Jewish, but not very devout, and married to Esther. He has affairs with his assistant Magda, with a young Jewish woman in Piaski named Zeftel and with a middle class Catholic widow in Warsaw named Emilia.

Yasha and Magda travel to Warsaw to perform on the stage. On the way he visits Zeftel at Piaski. When they arrive in Warsaw, Yasha also visits Emilia and her daughter Halina. During this visit, he proposes to Emilia, and they agree to move to Italy. He would need to convert to Christianity, and divorce Esther to make the marriage possible. However, neither he nor Emilia has the money to make their plans possible.

Zeftel visits him in Warsaw and tells him that she has moved there and is staying with a man named Herman who has promised her work in Argentina. Yasha suspects that Herman is a pimp, and he accompanies Zeftel back to her new home, and spends much of the night talking and drinking with them. On his way back home, he makes a spur of the moment decision to rob the home of a rich neighbour of Emilia's named Zaruski, believing that his expertise in lock picking will help him. He breaks in without waking up Zaruski, but is unable to pick the lock of the safe. He then flees, and hurts his foot as he jumps from the balcony. He is seen by a policeman and runs away, eventually hiding in a synagogue where he joins the morning prayers.

He later visits Emilia, and whilst there hears about the attempted robbery at Zaruski's home. He confesses to Emilia that he was the thief, and they break up. Later that day, Magda commits suicide after she and Yasha have an argument about his affairs. He also discovers that Zeftel has become Herman's lover.

In an epilogue set three years later, Yasha has returned to Lublin and his wife, and given up performing to become a penitent. He has had himself bricked in to a small building with no doors, and with only a small window for food. He has now re-embraced his Jewish faith, though both his wife and rabbi tried to convince him not to have himself bricked in. He becomes famous as a holy man, and receives many visitors. The novel ends with him receiving a letter from Emilia. She tells of her anxiety when he disappeared three years previously. However she has since remarried. She has learned from newspapers about Yasha's penitence, and she asks for his forgiveness, telling him he is being too harsh to himself, and says that Halina will also write to him.

== Adaptations ==
A movie adaptation starring Alan Arkin was made in 1979.

== See also ==
- 20th century in literature
