= Isaac Bashevis Singer =

Jewish American author (1903–1991)

- יצחק באַשעװיס זינגער
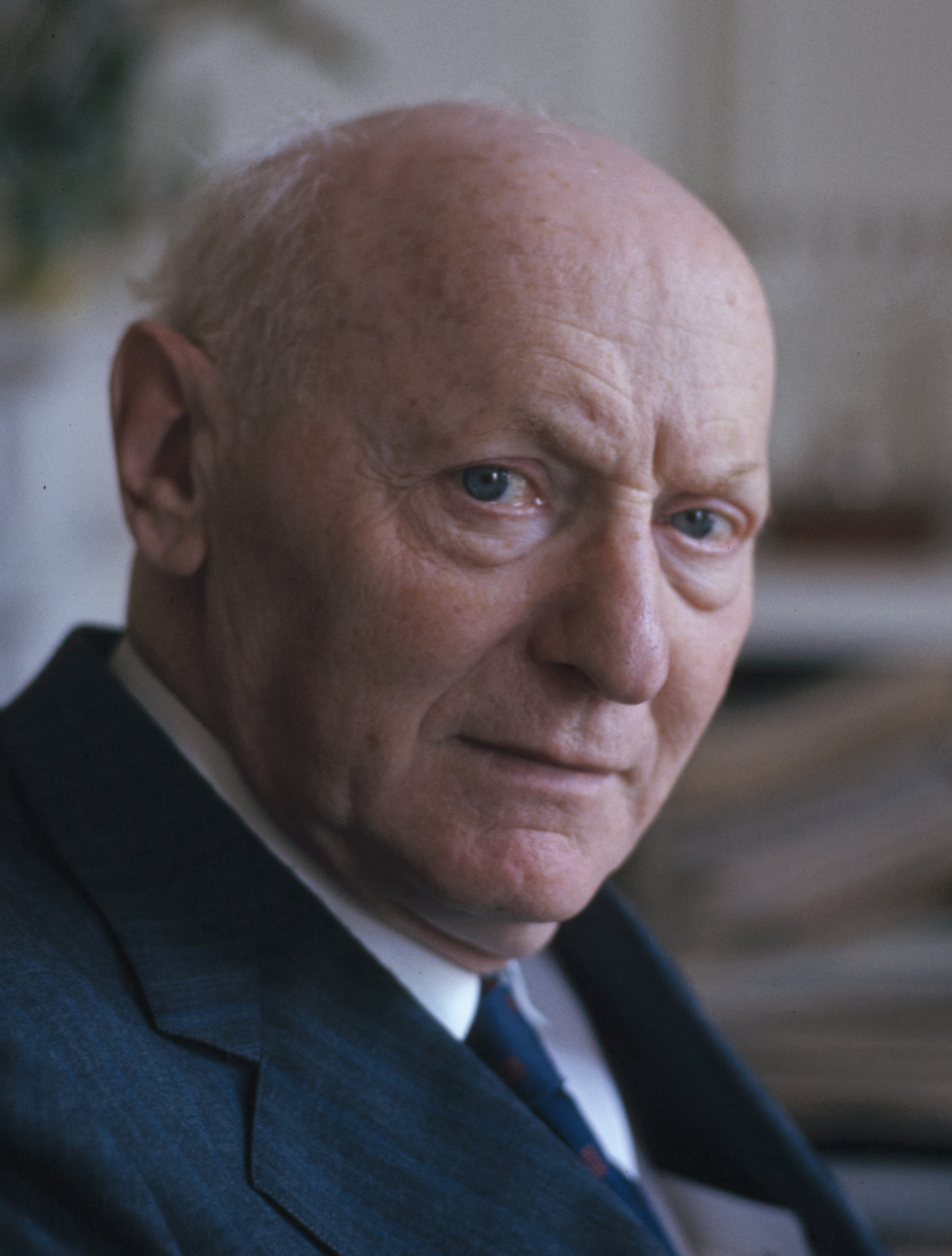
- Portrait c. 1980–1990
- Born: Icek Hersz Zynger; November 11, 1903; Leoncin, Congress Poland, Russian Empire
- Died: July 24, 1991 (aged 87); Surfside, Florida, United States
- Resting place: Cedar Park Cemetery, Paramus, New Jersey, U.S.
- Citizenship: Poland, United States
- Occupations: Novelist, short story writer
- Writing career
- Pen name: Bashevis, Warszawski (pron. Varshavsky), D. Segal
- Language: Yiddish
- Genre: Fictional prose
- Notable works: The Magician of Lublin; A Day of Pleasure
- Notable awards: National Book Award 1970, 1974; Nobel Prize in Literature 1978

Signature
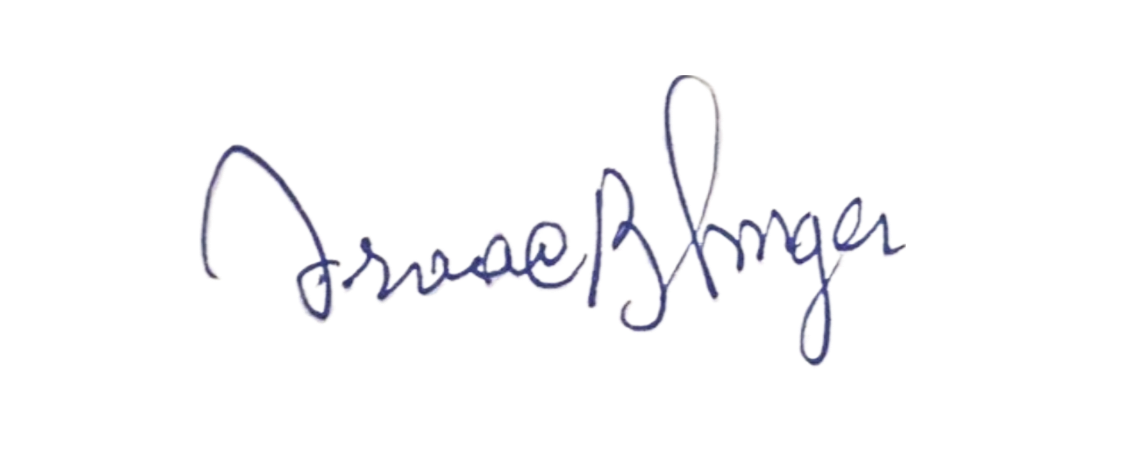

Isaac Bashevis Singer (Yiddish: יצחק באַשעװיס זינגער; November 11, 1903 – July 24, 1991) was a Polish-born Jewish American novelist, short-story writer, memoirist, essayist, and translator. Some of his works were adapted for the theater. He wrote and published first in Yiddish and later translated his own works into English with the help of editors and collaborators. He was awarded the Nobel Prize in Literature in 1978. A leading figure in the Yiddish literary movement, he was awarded two U.S. National Book Awards, one in Children's Literature for his memoir A Day of Pleasure: Stories of a Boy Growing Up in Warsaw (1970) and one in Fiction for his collection A Crown of Feathers and Other Stories (1974).

== Life ==
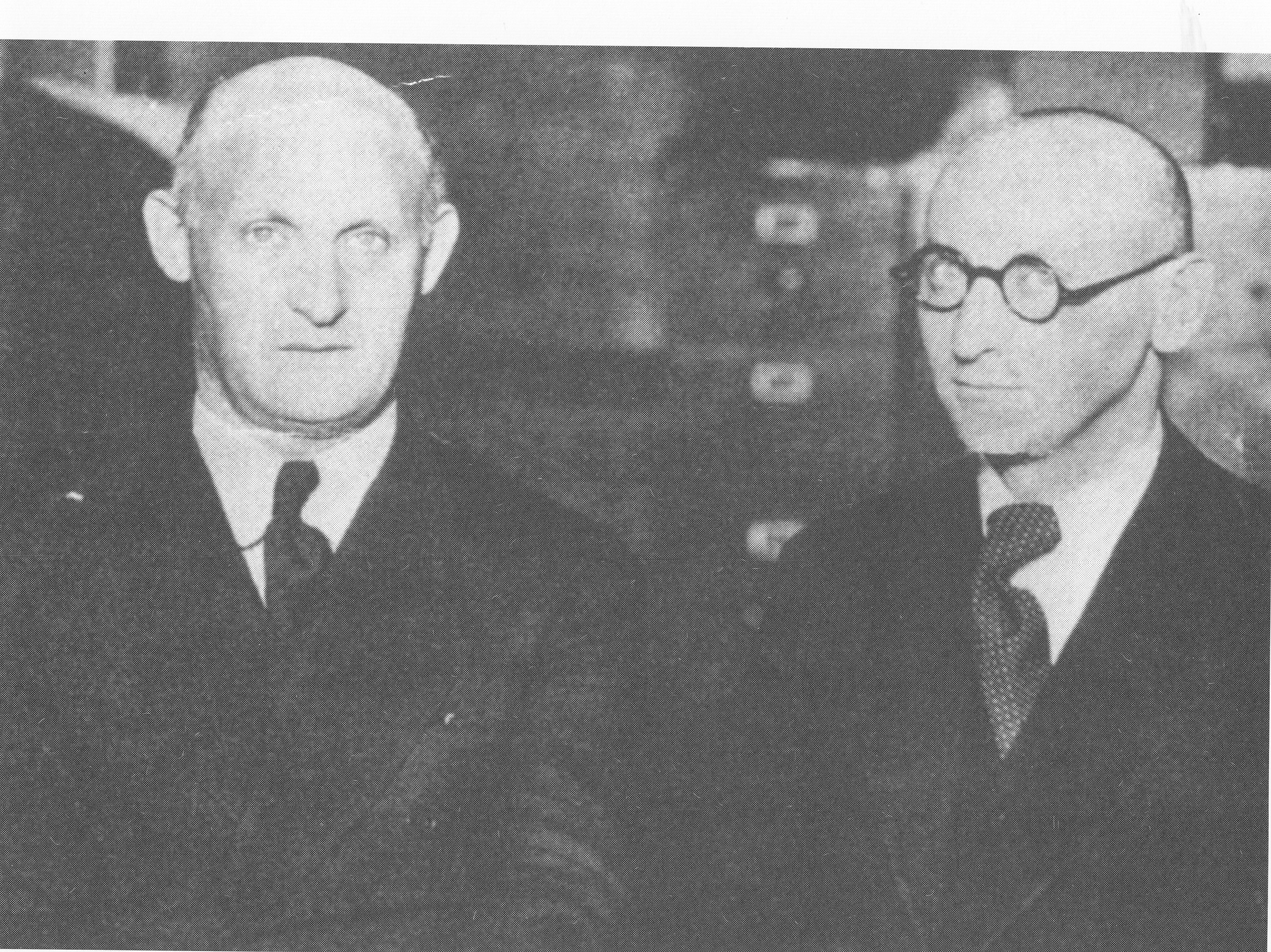
Isaac (right) with his brother Israel Joshua Singer (1930s)

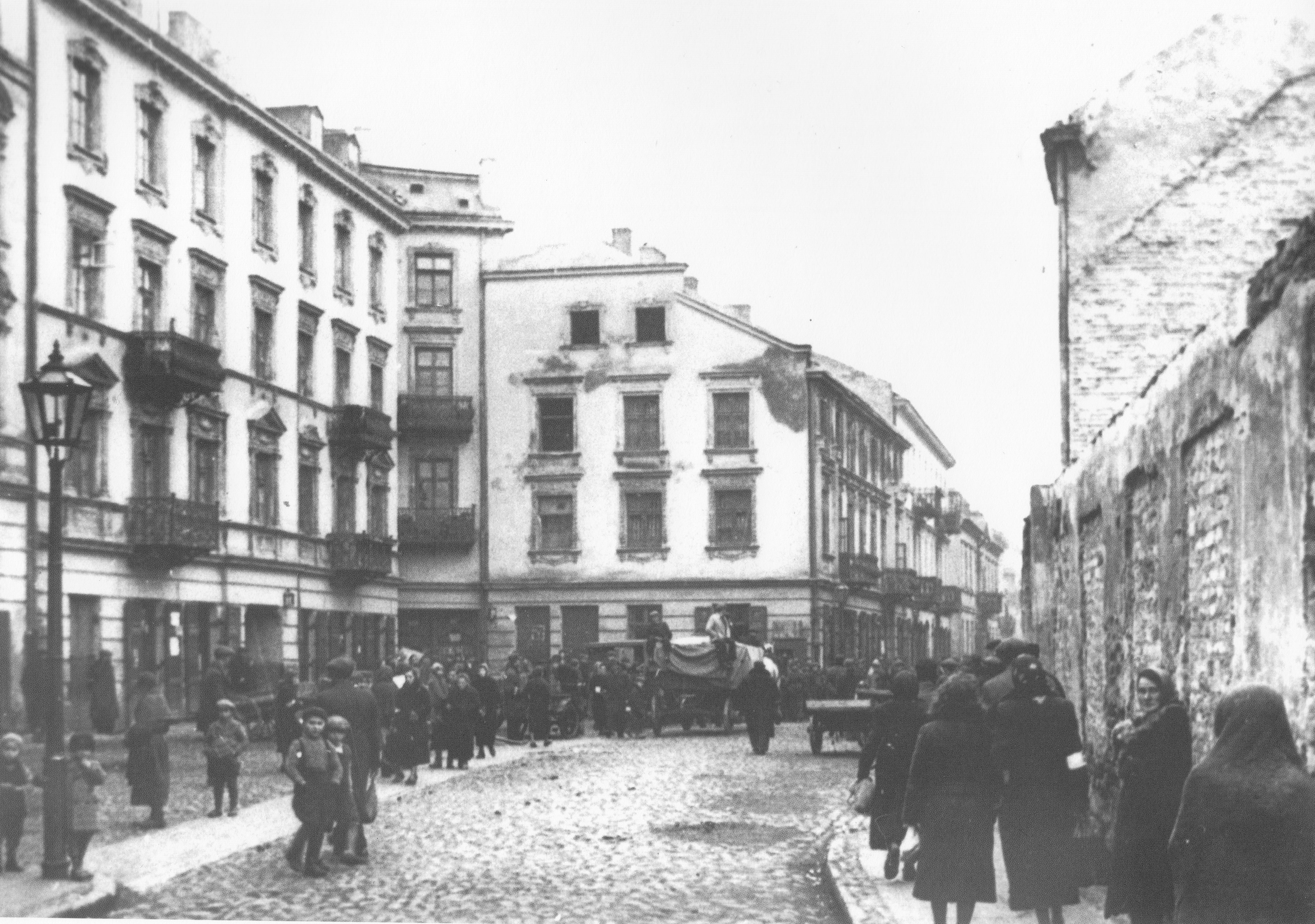
Krochmalna Street in Warsaw near the place where the Singers lived (1940 or 1941)

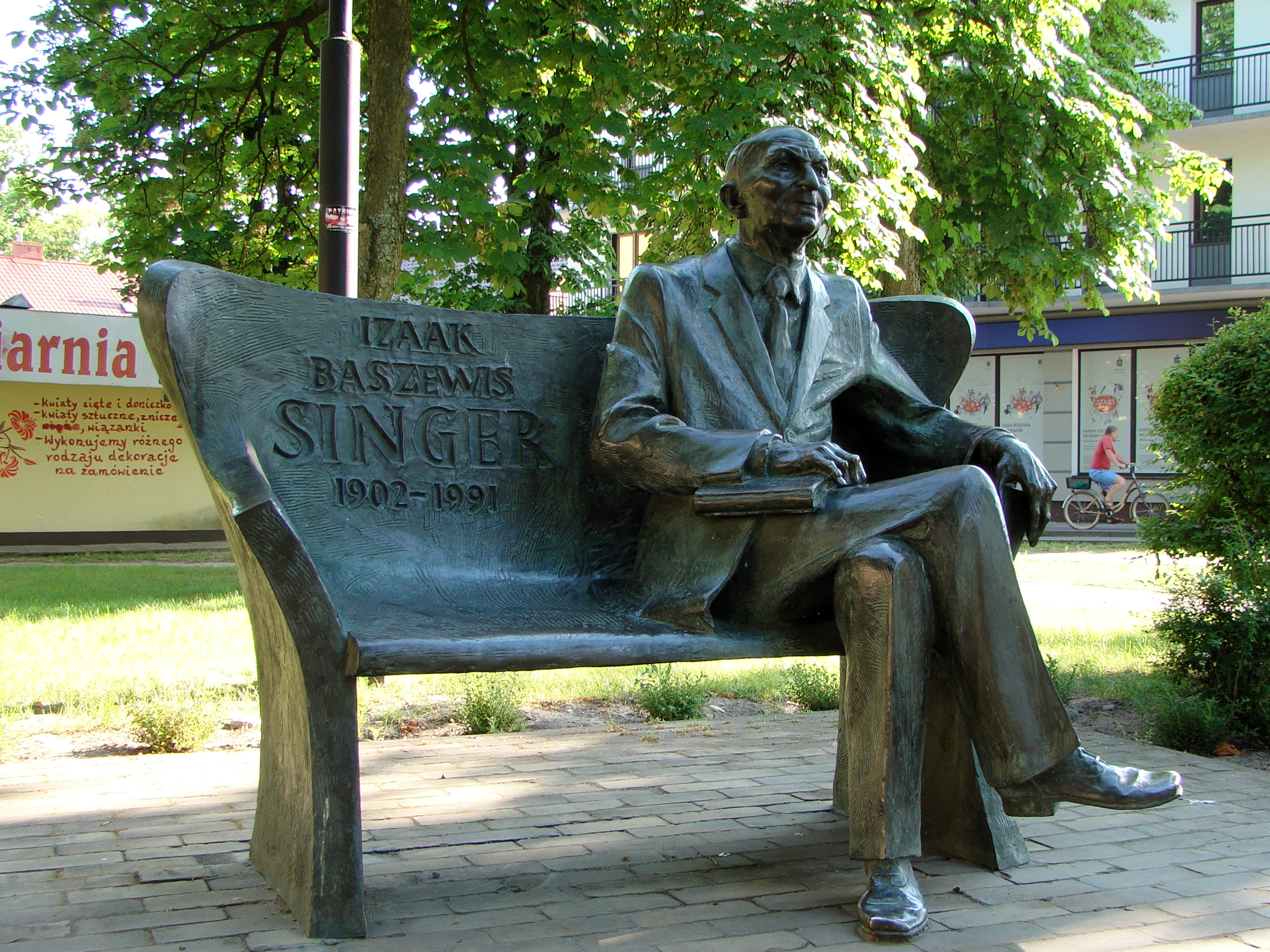
Singer's bench in Biłgoraj

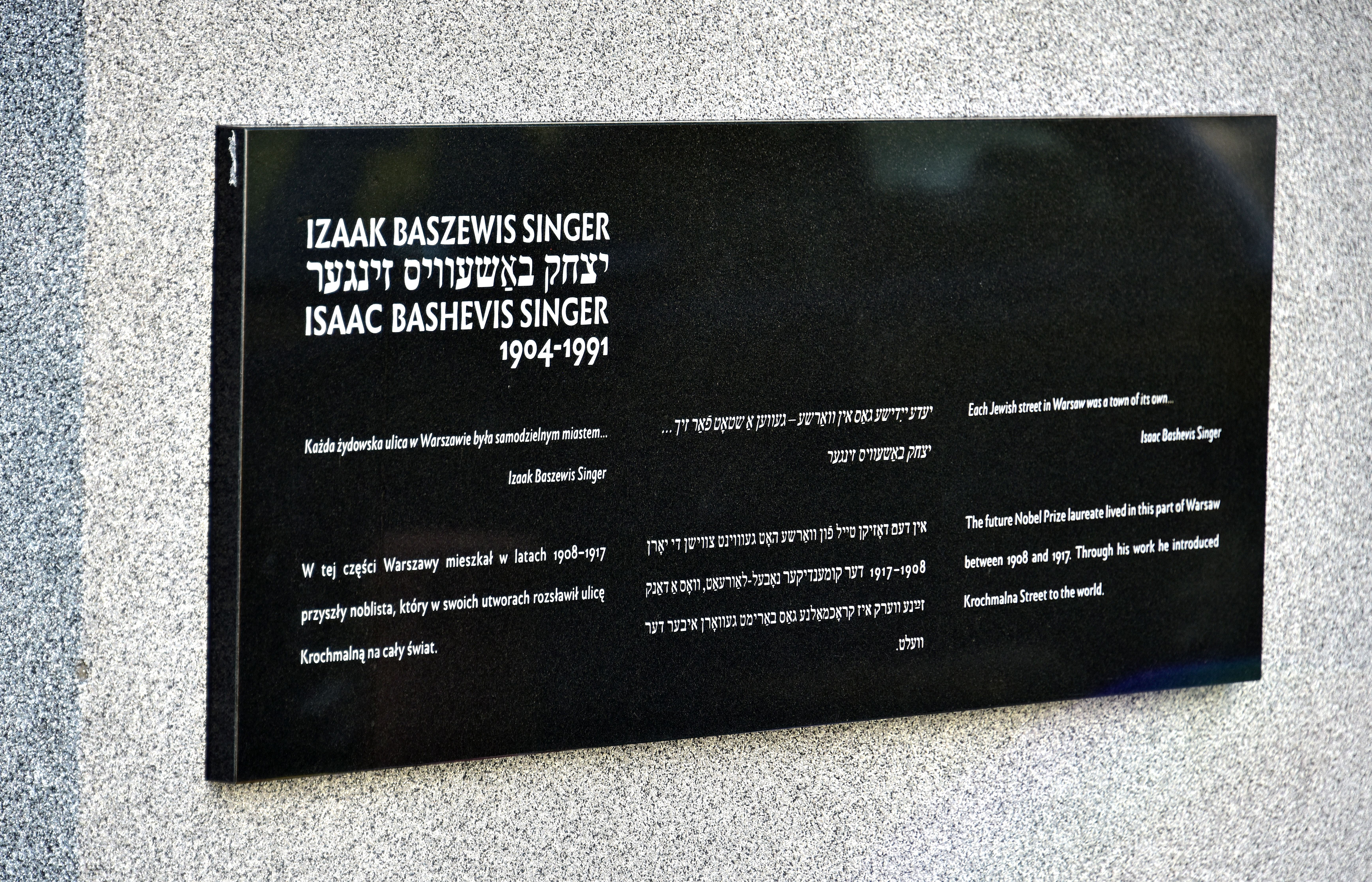
Commemorative plaque at 1 Krochmalna Street in Warsaw

Isaac Bashevis Singer was born in 1903 to a Jewish family in Leoncin village near Warsaw, Poland. The Polish form of his birth name was Icek Hersz Zynger. The exact date of his birth is uncertain, but most sources say it was probably November 11, a date similar to the one that Singer gave to his official biographer Paul Kresh, his secretary Dvorah Telushkin, and Rabbi William Berkowitz. Some sources mention 1902. The year 1903 is consistent with the historical events that his brother refers to in their childhood memoirs, including the death of Theodor Herzl. The often-quoted birth date, July 14, 1904, was made up by the author in his youth, possibly to make himself younger to avoid the draft.

His father Pinchus-Mendel Zinger (1868–?) was a Hasidic rabbi from Tomaszów Lubelski (Lublin Governorate), and his mother, Szewa (née Zilberman, 1871–?) was from Poritsk (Vladimir-Volynsky Uyezd, Volhynia Governorate); parents registered their marriage on June 2 (14) 1889 in Biłgoraj. Singer later used his first name in an initial literary pseudonym, Izaak Baszewis, which he later expanded. Both his older siblings, sister Esther Kreitman (1891–1954) and brother Israel Joshua Singer (1893–1944), became novelists as well, and his younger brother Moshe Singer became a rabbi. Esther was the first of the family to write stories.

The family moved to the court of the Rabbi of Radzymin in 1907, where his father became head of the Yeshiva. After the Yeshiva building burned down in 1908, the family moved to Warsaw, a flat at Krochmalna Street 10. In the spring of 1914, the Singers moved to No. 12.

The street where Singer grew up was located in the impoverished, Yiddish-speaking Jewish quarter of Warsaw. There his father served as a rabbi, and was called on to be a judge, arbitrator, religious authority and spiritual leader in the Jewish community. The unique atmosphere of pre-war Krochmalna Street can be found both in the collection of Varshavsky-stories, which tell stories from Singer's childhood, as well as in those novels and stories which take place in pre-war Warsaw.

=== World War I ===
In 1917, because of the hardships of World War I, the family split up. Singer moved with his mother and younger brother Moshe to Biłgoraj, a traditional shtetl, where his mother's brothers had followed his grandfather as rabbis. When his father became a village rabbi again in 1921, Singer returned to Warsaw. He entered the Tachkemoni Rabbinical Seminary and soon decided that neither the school nor the profession suited him. He returned to Biłgoraj, where he tried to support himself by giving Hebrew lessons, but soon gave up and joined his parents, considering himself a failure. In 1923, his older brother Israel Joshua arranged for him to move to Warsaw to work as a proofreader for the Jewish magazine Literarishe Bleter, of which the brother was an editor.

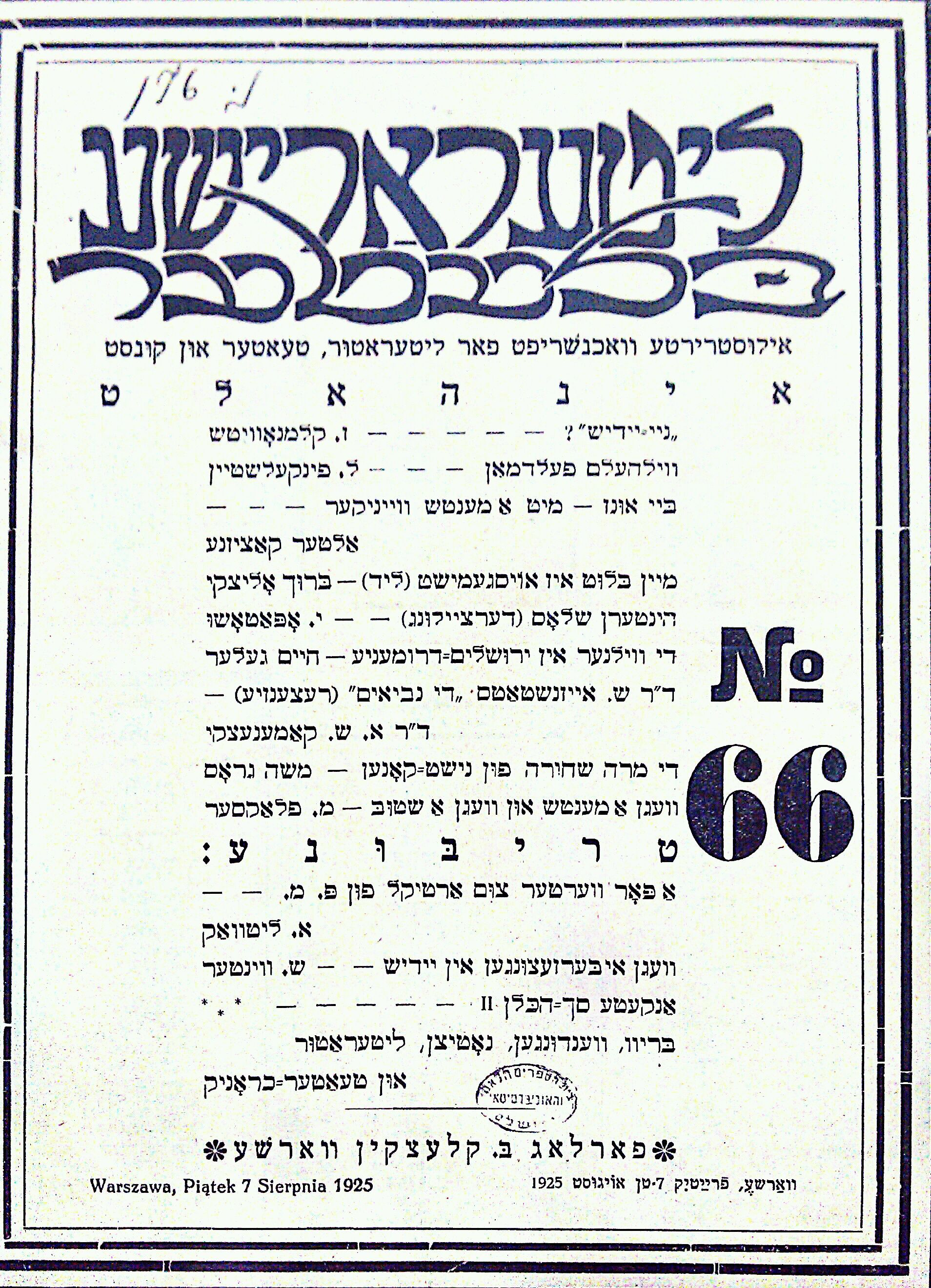
Cover of the Literarishe Bleter

=== United States ===
In 1935, four years before the Nazi invasion, Singer emigrated from Poland to the United States. He was fearful of the growing threat in neighboring Germany. The move separated the author from his common-law first wife Runia Pontsch and son Israel Zamir (1929–2014); they immigrated to Moscow and then Palestine. The three met again in 1955.

Singer settled in New York City, where he took up work as a journalist and columnist for The Jewish Daily Forward (פֿאָרװערטס), a Yiddish-language newspaper. (When he arrived in the US, he only knew three words of English: "Take a chair".) After a promising start, he became despondent and for some years felt Lost in America (title of his 1974 memoir published in Yiddish; published in English in 1981).

In 1938, he met Alma Wassermann (née Haimann) (1907–1996), a German-Jewish refugee from Munich. They married in 1940, and their union seemed to release energy in him; he returned to prolific writing and to contributing to the Forward. In addition to his pen name of "Bashevis", he published under the pen names of "Warszawski" (pron. Varshavsky) during World War II, and "D. Segal". They lived for many years in the Belnord apartment building on Manhattan's Upper West Side. He became a US citizen in 1943.

In 1981, Singer delivered a commencement address at the University at Albany and was presented with an honorary doctorate.

A resident of Surfside, Florida, Singer died on July 24, 1991, after suffering a series of strokes. He was buried in Cedar Park Cemetery, Paramus, New Jersey. 95th Street in Surfside is named Isaac Singer Boulevard in his honor.

== Literary career ==
Singer's first published story "Oyf der elter" ("In Old Age", 1925) won the literary competition of the Literarishe Bleter, where he worked as a proofreader. A reflection of his formative years in "the kitchen of literature" can be found in many of his later works. In 1933, Singer published his first novel, Satan in Goray, in installments in the literary magazine Globus, which he had co-founded with his lifelong friend, the Yiddish poet Aaron Zeitlin. It is set in the years following 1648, when the Chmielnicki massacres, considered one of the greatest Jewish catastrophes, occurred. The story describes the Jewish messianic cult that arose in the village of Goraj. It explores the effects of the faraway false messiah, Shabbatai Zvi, on the local population. Its last chapter imitates the style of a medieval Yiddish chronicle. With a stark depiction of innocence crushed by circumstance, the novel appears to foreshadow coming danger. In his later work The Slave (1962), Singer returns to the aftermath of 1648 in a love story between a Jewish man and a gentile woman. He portrays the traumatized and desperate survivors of the historic catastrophe with even deeper understanding.

=== The Family Moskat ===
Singer became a literary contributor to The Jewish Daily Forward only after his older brother Israel died in 1944. That year, Singer published The Family Moskat in his brother's honor. His own style showed in the daring turns of his action and characters, with double adultery during the holiest of nights of Judaism, the evening of Yom Kippur (despite being printed in a Jewish family newspaper in 1945). He was nearly forced to stop writing the novel by his editor-in-chief, Abraham Cahan, but was saved by readers who wanted the story to continue. After this, his stories—which he had published in Yiddish literary newspapers before—were printed in the Forward as well. Throughout the 1940s, Singer's reputation grew.

=== Language and themes ===
Singer always wrote and published in Yiddish. His novels were serialized in newspapers, which also published his short stories. He edited his novels and stories for publication in English, which was used as the basis for translation into other languages. Some of Singer's stories and novels have not been translated.

Singer believed in the power of his native language and thought that there was still a large audience, including in New York, who longed to read in Yiddish. In an interview in Encounter (February 1979), he said that although the Jews of Poland had died, "something—call it spirit or whatever—is still somewhere in the universe. This is a mystical kind of feeling, but I feel there is truth in it."

Some of his colleagues and readers were shocked by the breadth and frankness of his treatment of human nature. He wrote about lesbian desire in "Zeitl and Rickel" ("Tseytl un Rikl"), published in The Seance and Other Stories; a young woman who disguises herself as a man to study Talmud in "Yentl the Yeshiva Boy", published in Short Friday; and rabbis corrupted by demons in "Zeidlus the Pope", also published in Short Friday. In novels and stories that refer to events in his own life, he portrays himself unflatteringly, with some degree of accuracy, as an artist who is self-centered yet has a keen eye for the sufferings and tribulations of others.

=== Literary influences ===
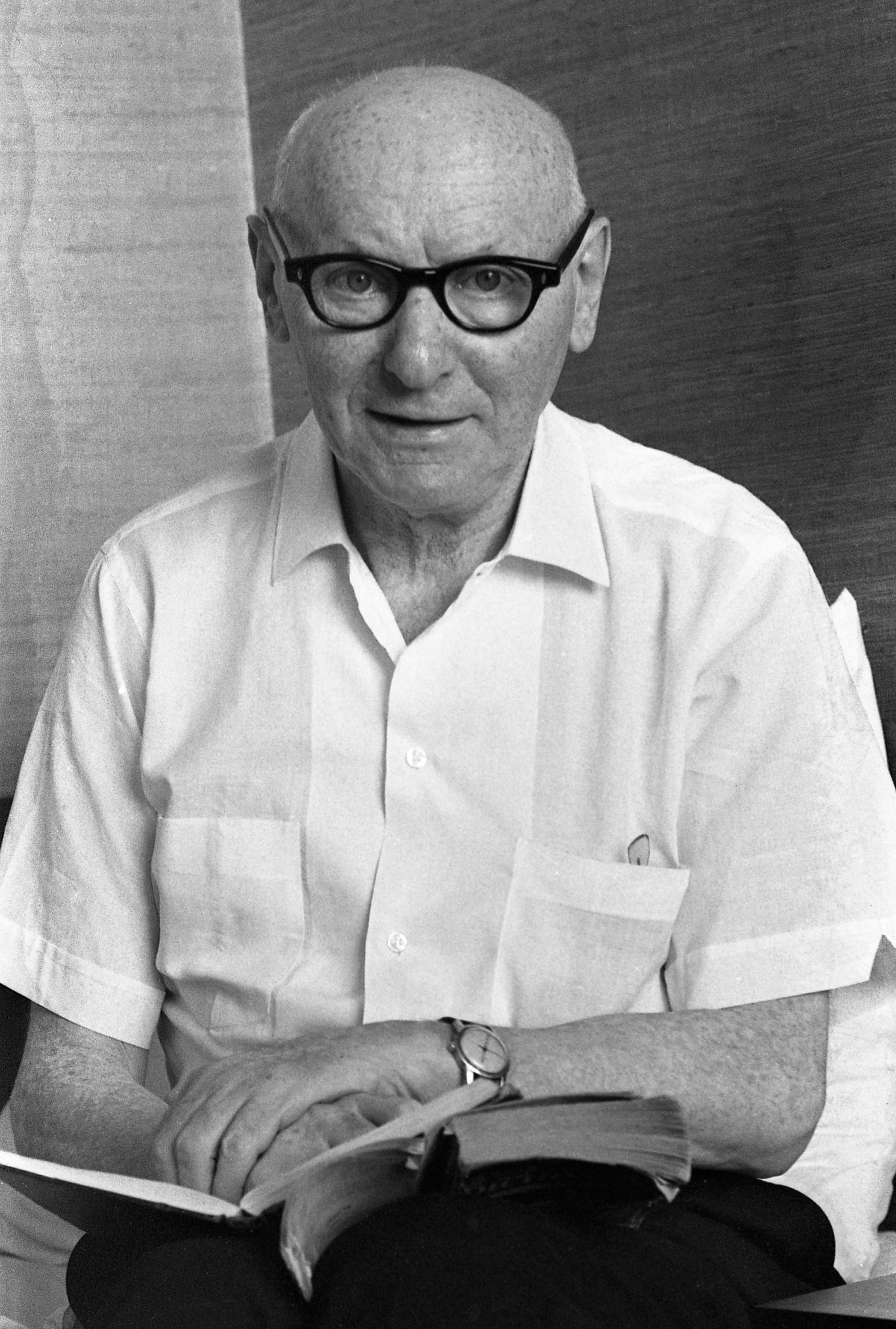
Singer in 1969

Singer had many literary influences. Besides the religious texts he studied, he grew up with a rich array of Jewish folktales and worldly Yiddish detective-stories about Max Spitzkopf and his assistant Fuchs by Jonas Kreppel. He read Russian, including Dostoyevsky's Crime and Punishment at the age of fourteen. He wrote in memoirs about the importance of the Yiddish translations donated in book-crates from America, which he studied as a teenager in Bilgoraj: "I read everything: Stories, novels, plays, essays... I read Rajsen, Strindberg, Don Kaplanowitsch, Turgenev, Tolstoy, Maupassant and Chekhov." He studied the philosophers Spinoza, Arthur Schopenhauer, and Otto Weininger. Among his Yiddish contemporaries, Singer considered his elder brother to be his greatest artistic example. He was also a life-long friend and admirer of the author and poet Aaron Zeitlin.

His short stories, which some critics feel contain his most lasting contributions, were influenced by Anton Chekhov and Guy de Maupassant. Crtitics claim Singer's stories can pack excitement in the space of a few pages. From Chekhov, Singer developed his ability to draw characters of profound complexity and dignity in the briefest of spaces. In the foreword to his personally selected volume of his finest short stories, Singer describes Chekhov, Maupassant, and "the sublime scribe of the Joseph story in the Book of Genesis" as the masters of the short story form.

Of his non-Yiddish-contemporaries, he was strongly influenced by the writings of Knut Hamsun, many of whose works he later translated, while he had a more critical attitude towards Thomas Mann, whose approach to writing he considered opposed to his own. Contrary to Hamsun's approach, Singer shaped his world not only with the egos of his characters, but also from Jewish moral tradition embodied by his father in the stories about Singer's youth. There was a dichotomy between the life his heroes lead and the life they feel they should lead—which gives his art a modernity his predecessors did not express. Singer's stories often involve highly individualist and anti-conformist characters rebelling alone against society. In a 1974 interview, Singer stated that "every human being, if he is a real, sensitive human being, feels quite isolated. It is only the people with very little individuality who always feel that they belong." He added that "Since I believe that the purpose of literature is to stress individuality, I also, unwillingly, stress human lonesomeness".

Singer's themes of witchcraft, mystery and legend draw on traditional sources, but they are contrasted with a modern and ironic consciousness. They are also concerned with the bizarre and the grotesque.

An important strand of his art is intra-familial strife, which he experienced when taking refuge with his mother and younger brother at his uncle's home in Biłgoraj. This is the central theme in Singer's family chronicles such as The Family Moskat (1950), The Manor (1967), and The Estate (1969). Some critics believe these show the influence of Thomas Mann's novel Buddenbrooks; Singer had translated Mann's Der Zauberberg (The Magic Mountain) into Yiddish as a young writer.

=== Illustrators ===
The artists who have illustrated Singer's novels, short stories, and children's books, include Raphael Soyer, Maurice Sendak, Larry Rivers, and Irene Lieblich. Singer personally selected Lieblich to illustrate two of his books for children, A Tale of Three Wishes and The Power of Light: Eight Stories for Hanukkah, after seeing her paintings at an Artists Equity exhibition in New York City. A Holocaust survivor, Lieblich was from Zamosc, Poland, a town adjacent to the area where Singer was raised. As their memories of shtetl life were so similar, Singer found Lieblich's images ideally suited to illustrate his texts. Of her style, Singer wrote that "her works are rooted in Jewish folklore and are faithful to Jewish life and the Jewish spirit."

=== Summary ===
Singer published at least 18 novels, 14 children's books, a number of memoirs, essays and articles. He is best known as a writer of short stories, which have been published in more than a dozen collections. The first collection of Singer's short stories in English, Gimpel the Fool, was published in 1957. The title story was translated by Saul Bellow and published in May 1953 in the Partisan Review. Selections from Singer's "Varshavsky-stories" in the Daily Forward were later published in anthologies such as My Father's Court (1966). Later collections include A Crown of Feathers (1973), with notable masterpieces in between, such as The Spinoza of Market Street (1961) and A Friend of Kafka (1970). His stories and novels reflect the world of the East European Jewry in which he grew up. After his many years in America, his stories also portrayed the world of the immigrants and their pursuit of an elusive American dream, which seems always beyond reach.

Prior to Singer's winning the Nobel Prize, English translations of dozens of his stories were published in popular magazines like The New Yorker, Playboy and Esquire that published literary works.

Singer was awarded the Nobel Prize in 1978.

Between 1981 and 1989, Singer contributed articles to Moment, an independent magazine which focuses on the life of the American Jewish community.

=== Film adaptations ===
His novel Enemies, A Love Story was adapted as a film by the same name (1989) and was quite popular, bringing new readers to his work. It features a Holocaust survivor who deals with varying desires, complex family relationships, and a loss of faith.

Singer's story, "Yentl, the Yeshiva Boy" was adapted into a stage version by Leah Napolin (with Singer), which was the basis for the film Yentl (1983) starring and directed by Barbra Streisand. In 1984, The New York Times published Singer's self-interview, where he disapproved of the film.

Alan Arkin starred as Yasha, the principal character in the film version of The Magician of Lublin (1979), which also featured Shelley Winters, Louise Fletcher, Valerie Perrine and Lou Jacobi. In the final scene, Yasha achieves his lifelong ambition of being able to fly, though not as the magic trick he had originally planned.

Another Singer-inspired film is Mr. Singer's Nightmare and Mrs. Pupkos Beard (1974) directed by Bruce Davidson, a renowned photographer who became Singer's neighbor. This film is a half-hour mixture of documentary and fantasy for which Singer wrote the script and played the leading role.

The 2007 film Love Comes Lately, starring Otto Tausig, was adapted from several of Singer's stories.

== Views and opinions ==
=== Judaism ===
Singer's relationship to Judaism was complex and unconventional. He identified as a skeptic and a loner, though he felt a connection to his Orthodox roots. Ultimately, he developed a view of religion and philosophy which he called "private mysticism". As he put it, "Since God was completely unknown and eternally silent, He could be endowed with whatever traits one elected to hang upon Him."

Singer was raised Orthodox and learned all the Jewish prayers, studied Hebrew and learned Torah and Talmud. As he recounted in the autobiographical short story "In My Father's Court", he broke away from his parents in his early twenties. Influenced by his older brother, who had done the same, he began spending time with non-religious bohemian artists in Warsaw. Although Singer believed in a God, as in traditional Judaism, he stopped attending Jewish religious services of any kind, even on the High Holy Days. He struggled throughout his life with the feeling that a kind and compassionate God would never support the great suffering he saw around him, especially the Holocaust deaths of so many of the Polish Jews from his childhood. In one interview with the photographer Richard Kaplan, he said, "I am angry at God because of what happened to my brothers": Singer's older brother died suddenly in February 1944, in New York, of a thrombosis; his younger brother perished in Soviet Russia around 1945, after being deported with his mother and wife to Southern Kazakhstan in Stalin's purges.

Despite the complexities of his religious outlook, Singer lived in the midst of the Jewish community throughout his life. He did not seem to be comfortable unless he was surrounded by Jews; particularly Jews born in Europe. Although he spoke English, Hebrew, and Polish fluently, he always considered Yiddish his natural tongue and always wrote in Yiddish. After he had achieved success as a writer in New York, Singer and his wife began spending time during the winters in Miami with its Jewish community, many of them New Yorkers.

Eventually, as senior citizens, they moved to Miami. After his death, Singer was buried in a traditional Jewish ceremony in Cedar Park Cemetery, a Jewish cemetery in Paramus, New Jersey.

=== Vegetarianism ===
Singer was a prominent Jewish vegetarian for the last 35 years of his life and often included vegetarian themes in his works. In his short story "The Slaughterer," he described the anguish of an appointed slaughterer trying to reconcile his compassion for animals with his job of killing them. He felt that the ingestion of meat was a denial of all ideals and all religions: "How can we speak of right and justice if we take an innocent creature and shed its blood?" When asked if he had become a vegetarian for health reasons, he replied: "I did it for the health of the chickens."

Vegetarianism is a recurrent theme in Singer's novel Enemies, a Love Story. One character, a Holocaust survivor, declares that "God himself eats meat—human flesh. There are no vegetarians—none. If you had seen what I have seen, you would know that God approves of slaughter," and another character points out "that what the Nazis had done to the Jews, man was doing to animals." In The Letter Writer, Singer wrote "In relation to [animals], all people are Nazis; for the animals, it is an eternal Treblinka," which became a classic reference in the comparison of animal exploitation with the Holocaust.

In the preface to Steven Rosen's Food for Spirit: Vegetarianism and the World Religions (1986), Singer wrote, "When a human kills an animal for food, he is neglecting his own hunger for justice. Man prays for mercy, but is unwilling to extend it to others. Why should man then expect mercy from God? It's unfair to expect something that you are not willing to give. It is inconsistent. I can never accept inconsistency or injustice. Even if it comes from God. If there would come a voice from God saying, 'I'm against vegetarianism!' I would say, 'Well, I am for it!' This is how strongly I feel in this regard."

=== Politics ===
Singer described himself as "conservative," adding that "I don't believe by flattering the masses all the time we really achieve much." His conservative side was most apparent in his Yiddish writing and journalism, where he was openly hostile to Marxist sociopolitical agendas. In the Forverts he once wrote, "It may seem like terrible apikorses [heresy], but conservative governments in America, England, France, have handled Jews no worse than liberal governments.... The Jew's worst enemies were always those elements that the modern Jew convinced himself (really hypnotized himself) were his friends."

=== Zionism ===
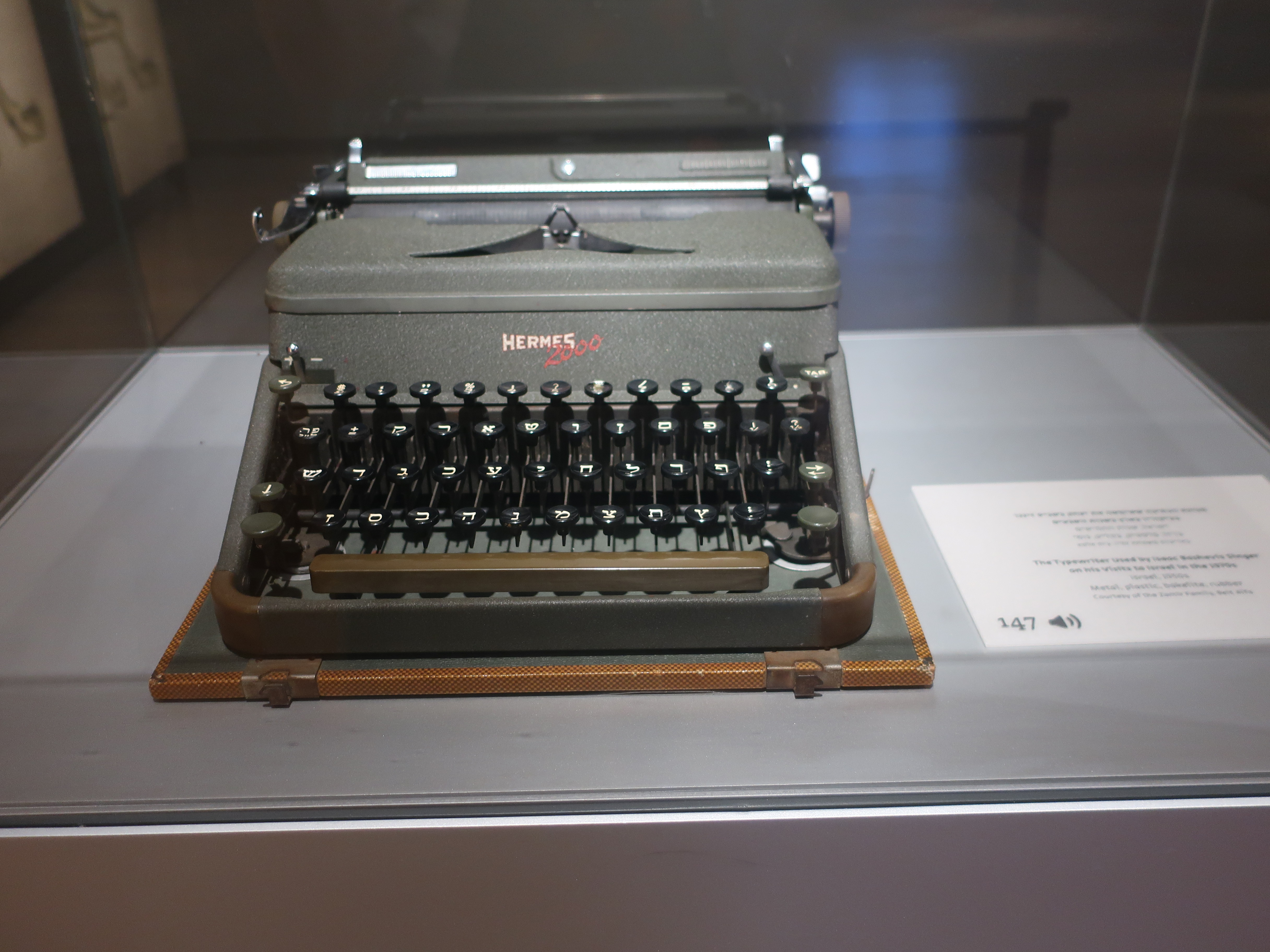
The typewriter that Singer used during his visits to Israel in the 1970s

Issac Bashevis was ambivalent on the question of Zionism, and he viewed the immigration of Jews to Palestine critically. As a Polish Jew from Warsaw, he was historically confronted with the question of the Jewish fate during Nazi persecution. He exercised social responsibility towards the immigration of European and American Jewish groups to Israel after World War II. Strictly based on Jewish family doctrine rather than politics and socialism, his former partner Runya Pontsch and his son Israel Zamir immigrated to Palestine in 1938, in order to live a typical kibbutz life there.

In his story The Certificate (1967), which has autobiographical character, he fictionalizes this question from a time in the mid-1920s when he was himself considering moving to the British Mandate Palestine. The protagonist of the story decides to leave Palestine, however, to move back into his shtetl. For Singer then, Zionism becomes the "road not taken". However, through his journalistic assignments in late 1955, Singer made his first trip to Israel, accompanied by his wife Alma. Describing the trip to his Yiddish readers, he introduces the world for the first time to the young state of Israel. In a change of mind, he then describes the Land of Israel as a "reality, and part of everyday life." Interestingly enough, he notes the cultural tensions between Sephardic and Ashkenazi Jewish people during the boat trip from Naples to Haifa and during his stay in the new nation. With the description of Jewish immigration camps in the new land, he foresaw the difficulties and socio-economic tensions in Israel, and hence turned back to his critical views of Zionism. He scrutinized the ideology further, as he was advancing his thought of critical Zionism.

Singer was a member of the executive committee of the Writers and Artists for Peace in the Middle East, a pro-Israel group. In 1984, he signed a letter protesting German arms sales to Saudi Arabia.

== Legacy and honors ==
=== Awards and prizes ===
- Jewish Book Council for The Slave, 1963
- Itzik Manger Prize, 1973
- National Book Award twice: A Day of Pleasure, 1970; A Crown of Feathers, 1974
- Nobel Prize for Literature, 1978

Along with Czesław Miłosz (Polish-American), Singer is a rare American Nobel Laureate in Literature that didn't receive a Pulitzer Prize award or citation.

=== Other honors and recognition ===
- An academic scholarship for undergraduate study at the University of Miami, named in his honor
- The Jewish-American Hall of Fame
- A street in Surfside, Florida, named in his honor
- A street in New York City named in his honor (W. 86th St.)
- A street in Leoncin, Poland, named in his honor (ul. Isaaca Bashevisa Singera)
- A commemorative plaque attached to a front wall of a building where Singer and his family resided in Radzymin, Poland (ul. Stary Rynek 7, 05-250 Radzymin)
- A park square in Radzymin, named in his honor (skwer im. Isaaca Bashevisa Singera)
- A city square in Lublin, Poland, a hometown of the protagonist of The Magician of Lublin novel, named in writer's honor (pl. Isaaka Singera)
- A street in Biłgoraj, Poland, named in his honor (ul. Isaaca Bashevisa Singera)
- A street in Tel Aviv, Israel

== Published works ==
Note: Publication dates refer to English editions, not the Yiddish originals, which often predate the versions in translation by 10 to 20 years.

=== Novels ===
- Satan in Goray (serialized: 1933, book: 1935)—Yiddish original: דער שטן אין גאריי
- Eulogy to a Shoelace—Yiddish original: די קלײנע שוסטערלעך
- The Family Moskat (1950)—Yiddish original: די פאמיליע מושקאט
- The Magician of Lublin (1960)—Yiddish original: דער קונצנמאכער פון לובלין
- The Slave (1962)—Yiddish original: דער קנעכט
- The Manor (1967)
- The Estate (1969)
- Enemies, a Love Story (1972)—Yiddish original: שׂונאים. די געשיכטע פֿון אַ ליבע
- Shosha (1978)
- Reaches of Heaven: A Story of the Baal Shem Tov (1980)
- The Penitent (1983)—Yiddish original: דער בעל־תשובה
- Teibele and Her Demon (1983) (play)
- The King of the Fields (1988)
- Scum (1991)
- The Certificate (1992)
- Meshugah (1994)
- Shadows on the Hudson (1997)—Yiddish original: שאָטנס בײַם האָדסאָן

=== Short story collections ===
- Gimpel the Fool and Other Stories (1957)—Yiddish original: גימפּל תּם און אַנדערע דערציילונגען
- The Spinoza of Market Street (1961)
- Short Friday and Other Stories (1963)
- The Séance and Other Stories. 1968a.
- A Friend of Kafka and Other Stories (1970)
- A Crown of Feathers and Other Stories (1974)—shared the National Book Award, fiction, with Gravity's Rainbow by Thomas Pynchon
- Passions and Other Stories (1975)
- The Mirror and Other Stories (1975) – Yiddish original: דער שפּיגל און אַנדערע דערציילונגען
- Old Love (1979)
- Stories from Behind the Stove (1979) – Yiddish original: מעשׂיות פֿון הינטערן אױװן
- The Collected Stories. 1982.
- The Image and Other Stories (1985)
- The Death of Methuselah and Other Stories (1988)

=== Juvenile literature ===
- Zlateh the Goat and Other Stories, illustrated by Maurice Sendak (1966) – runner up for the Newbery Medal (Newbery Honor Book)
- Mazel and Shlimazel, illus. Margot Zemach (1967)
- The Fearsome Inn, illus. Nonny Hogrogian (1967) – Newbery Honor Book
- When Shlemiel Went to Warsaw and Other Stories, illus. Margot Zemach (1968) – Newbery Honor Book—Yiddish original: ווען שלימואל איז געגאנגען קיין ווארשע
- The Golem, illus. Uri Shulevitz (1969)
- Elijah the Slave: A Hebrew Legend Retold, illus. Antonio Frasconi (1970)
- Joseph and Koza: or the Sacrifice to the Vistula, illus. Symeon Shimin (1970)
- Alone in the Wild Forest, illus. Margot Zemach (1971)
- The Topsy-Turvy Emperor of China, illus. William Pène du Bois (1971)
- The Wicked City, illus. Leonard Everett Fisher (1972)
- The Fools of Chelm and Their History, illus. Uri Shulevitz (1973)
- Why Noah Chose the Dove, illus. Eric Carle (1974)
- A Tale of Three Wishes, illus. Irene Lieblich (1975)
- Naftali the Storyteller and His Horse, Sus, illus. Margot Zemach (1976)
- The Power of Light – Eight Stories for Hanukkah, illus. Irene Lieblich (1980)
- Yentl the Yeshiva Boy, illus. Uri Shulevitz (1983)
- Stories for Children (1984) – collection
- Shrew Todie and Lyzer the Miser and Other Children's Stories (1994)
- The Parakeet Named Dreidel (2015)

=== Nonfiction ===
- The Hasidim (1973)

=== Autobiographical writings ===
- In My Father's Court, New York: Farrar, Straus & Giroux, 1967 [1963]—Yiddish original: מיין טאטנ'ס בית דין שטוב
- A Day of Pleasure, Stories of a Boy Growing Up in Warsaw, New York: Doubleday, 1969. National Book Award, Children's Literature
- A Little Boy in Search of God, New York: Doubleday, 1976.
- A Young Man in Search of Love, New York: Doubleday, 1978.
- Lost in America, New York: Doubleday, 1981.
- Love and exile, New York: Doubleday, 1984.
- More Stories from My Father's Court, New York: Farrar, Straus & Giroux, 1999 – Yiddish original: מײַן טאַטנ׳ס בית־דין שטוב: המשכים־זאַמלונג

=== Short stories ===
- The New Winds, NY: Farrar, Straus and Giroux, 1963.
- "Zeitl and Rickel", The Hudson Review, 20th Anniversary Issue, 21 (1), translated by Mirra Ginsburg: 127–37, Spring 1968, doi:10.2307/3849538, JSTOR 3849538.

=== Collected works ===
- Singer, Isaac Bashevis (2004), Stavans, Ilan (ed.), Stories, vol. 1, Library of America, ISBN 978-1-931082-61-7.
- ——— (2004), ——— (ed.), Stories, vol. 2, Library of America, ISBN 978-1-931082-62-4.
- ——— (2004), ——— (ed.), Stories, vol. 3, Library of America, ISBN 978-1-931082-63-1.

=== Films and stage productions based on Singer's work ===
- Enemies, A Love Story (1989)
- Love Comes Lately (2007)
- The Magician of Lublin (1979)
- Yentl (1983)
- Mr. Singer's Nightmare or Mrs. Pupkos Beard
- Fool's Paradise

== See also ==
- List of animal rights advocates
- List of Jewish Nobel laureates
- List of Polish Nobel laureates
- Yiddish literature

== General and cited references ==
- Burgess, Anthony (1998), Rencontre au Sommet (in French), Paris: Éd. Mille et une nuits.
- Richard Burgin. Conversations with Isaac Bashevis Singer. NY: Doubleday, 1985.
- Carr, Maurice (December 1992), "My Uncle Itzhak: A Memoir of I.B. Singer", Commentary.
- Lester Goran. The Bright Streets of Surfside: The Memoir of a Friendship with Isaac Bashevis Singer. Kent, OH: Kent State University Press, 1994.
- Hadda, Janet (1997), Isaac Bashevis Singer: A Life, New York: Oxford University Press.
- Kresh, Paul (1979), Isaac Bashevis Singer: The Magician of West 86th Street, New York: Dial Press.
- Roberta Saltzman. Isaac Bashevis Singer: a bibliography of his works in Yiddish and English, 1960–1991. Lanham, MD: Scarecrow Press, 2002. ISBN 0-8108-4315-3
- Dorothea Straus. Under the Canopy. New York: George Braziller, 1982. ISBN 0-8076-1028-3
- Florence Noiville. Isaac B. Singer, A Life, Farrar, Straus and Giroux, 2006
- Olidort, Shoshana. "Proverbial Language and Literary Truth in the Work of Isaac Bashevis Singer." Prooftexts 38, no. 3 (2021): 510–531.
- Telushkin, Dvorah (1997). Master of Dreams: A Memoir of Isaac Bashevis Singer. New York: Morrow.
- Tree, Stephen (2004), Isaac Bashevis Singer, Munich: DTV Deutscher Taschenbuch, ISBN 978-3423244152.
- Agata Tuszyńska. Lost Landscapes: In Search of Isaac Bashevis Singer and the Jews of Poland. New York: Morrow, 1998. Hardcover. ISBN 0688122140 via Google Books, preview.
- Wolitz, Seth L, ed. (2001), The Hidden Isaac Bashevis Singer, Austin: University of Texas Press.
- Israel Zamir. Journey to My Father, Isaac Bashevis Singer. New York: Arcade 1995.
- Aleksandra Ziolkowska-Boehm The Roots Are Polish. Toronto: Canadian-Polish Research Institute, 2004. ISBN 0-920517-05-6
