= Ohad Talmor =

American jazz musician (born 1970)

Ohad Talmor (born 1970) is an American/Swiss jazz saxophonist, clarinetist, composer, conductor and arranger.

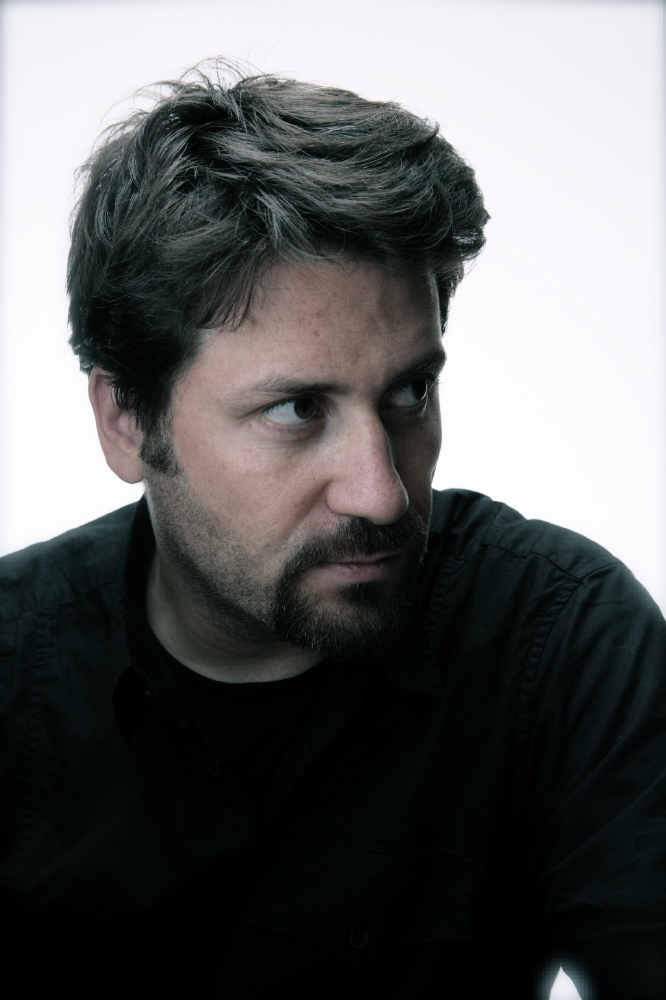
Portrait of Ohad Talmor

== Life and work ==
=== Early years ===
Talmor grew up in Geneva, Switzerland, where he began piano lessons at the age of 5 at the local conservatory. He met virtuoso pianist Martha Argerich in his teens who exposed him to a world of music and musicians which helped shape his musical upbringing both as an instrumentalist and as a composer.
Talmor discovered the saxophone while attending high school in the US in 1987. Back in Switzerland, he devoted himself to this instrument while briefly studying musicology and philosophy at the University of Geneva. He also studied composition with Russian pianist and composer Alexander Rabinovitch.
In 1989, he met alto saxophonist Lee Konitz at a recording session. Lee Konitz would prove pivotal in Ohad Talmor's career, mentoring him closely for years to come. Eventually Talmor became one of Lee Konitz's privileged musical partners, resulting in 8 records and over 200 concerts worldwide. From 1990 to 1995, Talmor was deeply involved in the European Jazz scene, leading his own quartet or quintet which featured American trombonist Glenn Ferris. During this time, he collaborated with many of Europe's leading musicians including Joachim Kühn, Matthieu Michel, Benoit Delbecq.
In 1994 and 1995 he toured Europe with Lee Konitz, Steve Swallow and different large ensembles (including string quartet ) featuring music he had composed.

Talmor eventually moved to New York in 1995 getting a Composition degree from the Manhattan School of Music in 1997.

=== Present day ===
Talmor lives in Brooklyn, New York.
As a leader, his own projects include: "Back to the Land", a group featuring Chris Tordini and Eric McPherson with guests pianists Leo Genovese, David Virelles or vibraphonist Joel Ross.
"Newsreel", a Sextet featuring Dan Weiss, Jacob Sacks, Miles Okazaki, Shane Endsley and Matt Pavolka.
"Trio", with Miles Okazaki and Dan Weiss.
Talmor's other projects include:
Steve Swallow/Ohad Talmor/Adam Nussbaum Trio and
"Mass Transformation", a Nonet focusing on the Music of Anton Bruckner and featuring Austria's Spring String 4tet, singer Judith Berkson, Pete McCann, Shane Endsley, Mark Ferber.
Since 2004, he has been a devoted student of Hindustani music, playing the bansuri under the guidance of virtuoso flutist Steve Gorn.
Talmor is involved with the bustling Brooklyn jazz scene, performing regularly with Jason Moran, Joshua Redman, Gregoire Maret, Fred Hersh, Kurt Rosenwinkel, Chris Cheek, Dave Douglas, Carla Bley, Joe Lovano, Chris Potter, Billy Hart.

As a Composer, Arranger and Conductor, Talmor is equally involved in writing for jazz and classical idioms.

He leads his "Grand Ensemble" project which last played at the New York Jazz Winter Festival and focused on a series of Virtuosic Études.
He has composed, arranged and conducted music for large ensembles, and for soloists including Kurt Rosenwinkel, Joshua Redman/Mark Turner/Chris Cheek, Gregoire Maret, Lee Konitz, Chris Potter or the late Michael Brecker.
His music has been performed by jazz ensembles around the world, including Germany's WDR Big Band, Portugal's OJM Big Band, Switzerland's Big Band de Lausanne, Lucerne Jazz Orchestra and DKSJ All Stars, Brazil's SoundScape Orquestra, Belgium's Bruxelles Jazz Orchestra, and NYC's MSM Big Band with the Brecker Brothers.

His contributions to the classical idiom include music for pianist Martha Argerich, São Paulo's Symphonic Band, members of the Seiji Ozawa Orchestra in Japan, the Spring String Quartet from Austria or Portugal National Orchestra.
Talmor's large-form compositions include "Layas", his concerto for piano, drums and double orchestras, which premiered in February 2010 by the Porto National Orchestra, with the OJM Big Band with Jason Moran and Dan Weiss as featured soloists.

=== Other activities ===
Talmor is a Professor of Composition/Arranging and Music History at the Geneva Conservatoire Populaire de Danse, Musique et Théâtre. He is also the coordinator for its Jazz program.
Since 2025, Talmor is the Professor of Jazz Saxophone and Jazz Composition at Siena Jazz University Masters program.
He is also an adjunct professor at the New School in New York City.

Talmor is actively involved as a composer for films and radio plays.
His latest score is for the movie "Low Down" featuring John Hawkes, Elle Fanning, Glenn Close and musician Flea. The movie was primed at the Sundance and Karlovy Vary (Czech Rep) Film Festivals in 2014.
He has contributed numerous scores to Sci-Fi's Radio Drama Channel Seeing Ear Theater including the Tales from the Crypt audio series

In 2011 Talmor founded the Performance Space SEEDS::Brooklyn located in Prospect Heights in Brooklyn, NY.
Since 2018, Talmor is the Artistic Director of the Cortona Jazz Festival/Workshop.

In 2012 he was awarded the Jazz prize from Switzerland's SUISA Foundation for Music for his "innovative and creative jazz work".

In 2015 Talmor was awarded the EBU (European Broadcasting Union) Award for European Jazz Composer of the year.

== Discography ==
(discography partially complete)
The Other Quartet "13 pieces" (with Russ Johnson, Jim Hershman, Mike Sarin) (Knitting Factory, 1998)
The Other Quartet "Sound Stains" (with Russ Johnson, Pete McCann, Mark Ferber) (Knitting Factory, 2001)
MOB Trio "Loose" and "Quite Live in Brooklyn" (with Matt Wilson, Bob Bowen) (Omnitone, 1999)
Lee Konitz, Ohad Talmor & Axis Quartet Plays French Impressionist Music of the 20th Century (Palmetto, 2000)
BlueSeven "Dexter" (with Daniel D'Alcántara, Denis Lee, David Richards, Ricardo Castellanos, Bob Bowen, Matt Wilson, Rogerio Boccato) (BSR, 2002)
Christophe Schweizer "Full Circle Rainbow" (with Jason Moran, Billy Hart ) (TCB Records, 2003)
MOB Trio "Quite Live in Brooklyn" (with Matt Wilson, Bob Bowen) (Omnitone, 2004)
Steve Swallow-Ohad Talmor 6tet "Bum's Tale" (with Greg Tardy, Russ Johnson, Meg Okura, Jacob Garchik) (Palmetto, 2004)
Lee Konitz, Ohad Talmor String Project Inventions (Spring String 4tet) (Omnitone, 2004)
Demian Cabaud "Naranja" (with Phil Grenadier, Leo Genovese, Gerald Cleaver) (FreshSound, 2008)
Lee Konitz New Nonet (Directed by Ohad Talmor) (Omnitone, 2005)
Steve Swallow / Ohad Talmor / Adam Nussbaum "Playing in Traffic" (Auand Records, 2008)
TOAP Collectivo in Guimaraes "Vol. IV" (with Bernardo Sassetti, Demian Cabaud, Dan Weiss) (TOAP, 2009)
Ohad Talmor NEWSREEL (with Shane Endsley, Miles Okazaki, Jacob Sacks, Matt Pavolka, Dan Weiss; Auand Records 2008/9)
Evaristo Perez Trio feat Ohad Talmor "Why" (with Evaristo Perez, Cédric Gysler, Tobie Langel) (2009)
BlueSeven "Collage" (Daniel D'Alcántara, Denis Lee, Luis Neto, Josué dos Santos, Djalma Lima, R. Castellanos, Sidiel Vieira, C. Teixeira) (BSR, 2010)
Kurt Rosenwinkel and OJM "Our Secret World" (WOM, 2010)
Evaristo Perez Trio feat Ohad Talmor "Suite Paul Klee" (with Evaristo Perez, Cédric Gysler, David Meier) (2012)
Sebastien Ammann "Samadhi" (with Dave Ambrosio, Eric McPherson) (FreshSound, 2013)
Steve Swallow / Ohad Talmor / Adam Nussbaum "Singular Curves" (Auand Records, 2014)
Dan Weiss "Fourteen" (Pi Records, 2014)
Axel Fischbacher 4tet feat Ohad Talmor "Normal" (with Axel Fischbacher, Adam Nussbaum, Johannes Weidenmüller) (Jazzsick Records, 2015)
Justin Mullens Octet "The Cornucopiad" (BJU Records, 2016)
Dan Weiss "Sixteen:Drummers Suite" (Pi Records, 2016)
Ohad Talmor - Christoph Irniger CounterpointS "Subway Lines" (with Baenz Oester, Vinnie Sperrazza) (FreshSounds Records, 2017)
Adam Nussbaum "Lead Belly Project" (with Steve Cardenas, Nate Radley) (Sunnysides Records, 2018)
Lee Konitz Nonet "Old Songs New" (Sunnyside Records 2019)
Ohad Talmor NewsReel Sextet "Long Forms" (Intakt Records 2020)
Adam Nussbaum ″Lead Belly Reimagined″ (with Steve Cardenas, Nate Radley) (Sunnysides Records, 2020)
Ohad Talmor Trio "Mise en Place" with Miles Okazaki, Dan Weiss, (Intakt Records 2021)
Ohad Talmor ″Back to the Land″ with David Virelles, Leo Genovese, Chris Tordini, Eric McPherson, Adam O'Farrill, Shane Endsley, Russ Johnson, Grégoire Maret (Intakt, 2023)
