= Tales from the Crypt (radio series) =

American radio series

- Genre: Radio drama
- Running time: 34–46 minutes per episode
- Country of origin: United States
- Language: English
- Starring: Seeing Ear Theatre
- Announcer: Alissa Hunnicutt
- Produced by: Brian Smith; Jack Wohl; George Zarr
- Executive producers: Richard Donner; David Giler; Walter Hill; Joel Silver; Robert Zemeckis
- Narrated by: John Kassir
- Original release: 2000 – 2000
- No. of series: 1
- No. of episodes: 8
- Website: https://archive.org/details/tales-from-the-crypt-radio-series

Tales from the Crypt is an American radio series spun off from the HBO series of the same name based on the 1950s EC Comics, which ran for eight episodes in 2000.

== History ==
In 2000, several Tales from the Crypt "radio shows" were recorded for Seeing Ear Theatre, an online subsidiary of The Sci-Fi Channel, and were offered free as streaming RealAudio files on their website, as well as for sale on Audible.com. Featuring most of the same producers from the HBO series and John Kassir reprising the role of The Cryptkeeper, 13 episodes were planned (with forthcoming episodes listed as "TBA"), but ultimately only 8 stories were recorded.

Seven of the eight shows were released on CD in 2002 by Highbridge Audio ("This Trick'll Kill You" was omitted from the CD set). The Sci-Fi Channel removed the Seeing Ear Theatre section of their website in 2007 and Seeing Ear Theatre shows are no longer available from Audible.com, but surreptitiously recorded copies of all of the episodes have surfaced on various filesharing sites.

At the 2006 San Diego Comic-Con Crypt reunion panel, President of Tales from the Crypt Holdings Jack Wohl revealed plans to record further episodes for either Sirius Satellite Radio or XM Satellite Radio, but finding investors was cited as problematic and it ultimately never came to fruition.

== Theme song ==
The series utilized the same theme music by Danny Elfman that opened each episode of the HBO series, but it now included lyrics by Jack Wohl which were sung at the opening of each episode by the Cryptkeeper (John Kassir):

Welcome fiends to creepy scenes of eeriness and gore
Unearthly moans from rattling bones behind each creaking door
It's more than boo that'll frighten you; I long to hear your cries
You won't survive the tale that I've so ghoulishly devised
Dark and haunted, these undaunted Tales from the Crypt!

== Episodes ==
#	Title	Director	Writer(s)	Source	Running Time
1	"Island of Death"	Brian Smith	Tony Daniel	The Vault of Horror	38:15
1	A pair of film fanatic buddies (Luke Perry, Ramon de O'Campo) crash land on an uncharted island where they're forced to play a variation of "The Most Dangerous Game" against a seductive vixen (Gina Gershon) for the amusement of an eccentric millionaire (Nick Wyman) who's presiding over the proceedings from his deathbed.				
1	Cast: Gina Gershon as Galatea Hapsburg, Luke Perry as Quinn Dillon, Anne Bobby as Doris, Todd Cummings as Jeeves, Ramon de OCampo as Baily, Rafael Ferrer as Lothar, Nick Wyman as the Rich Man, John Kassir as the Crypt Keeper, and Alissa Hunnicutt as the series announcer.				
2	"A Little Stranger"	Tony Daniel	Greg Cox	Vault of Horror	37:17
2	While listening to election coverage, an aging United States senator (Martin Carey) recalls the evening in 1968 when he was forced to marry the parents of the presidential candidate, a pair of ghouls who left the reverend blind.				
2	Cast: Randy Maggiore as Zorgo, Lisa Nicole as Elicia, Martin Carey as Reverend Whitman, Mark Evans as Viktor Malvin, Alice Barden as Diane Walters, Sarah Provost as Stephanie, Rob Pedini as Billy, John Kassir as The Cryptkeeper, and Alissa Hunnicutt as the series announcer.				
3	"This Trick'll Kill You"	George Zarr	George Zarr	Tales from the Crypt	34:34
3	Following a botched convenience store robbery, a pair of thieves (Rebecca Nice, Todd Cummings) decide to lie low with a traveling circus. But things don't go quite as planned when a mysterious woman (Francesco Rizzo) offers to let them join her act.				
3	NOTE: This episode was omitted from the CD release. Another adaptation of this story is in The Vault of Horror				
3	Cast: Rebecca Nice as Inez Markini, Todd Cummings as Herb Markini, Simon Jones as Jeffrey Mudgely, Andrew Joffe as Otto Der Clown, Francesca Rizzo as Wahdi, John Kassir as the Crypt Keeper, and Alissa Hunnicutt as the series announcer.				
4	"Tight Grip"	Brian Smith	Tony Daniel, Brian Smith	Tales from the Crypt	45:31
4	A young girl named Kitty refuses to speak, except to her teddy bear and through her violin.				
4	NOTES: Excerpts from the recording session of this episode were used in the Season 2 DVD featurette Fright and Sound: Bringing the Crypt Experience to Radio.: Neither the CD release nor the original internet versions of this episode included closing credits.				
4	Cast: Tim Curry as Narrator, Randy Maggiore as Richard Ashton, Anne Bobby as Catherine Ashton, Kate Simses as Kitty Ashton, Rafael Ferrer as Dr. Molloy, Mort Banks as Detective, John Kassir as the Crypt Keeper, and Alissa Hunnicutt as the series announcer.				
5	"Zombie!"	Brian Smith	Tish Benson, Tony Daniel	Tales from the Crypt	45:48
5	Come to beautiful Haiti where, for $10,000 (U.S.), a man can flee the law, escape his own sorry past — and even wind up with a beautiful woman in tow! David Goodson, played in an intense performance by veteran character actor Oliver Platt (Deadline, Bicentennial Man, The Imposters, Working Girl), has paid the price and he's well on his way to his promised new life. But in voodou-rich Haiti, when a man buys happiness with other people's money, he sometimes awakens powerful enemies - and not just among the living!				
5	NOTE: Neither the CD release nor the original internet versions of this episode included closing credits.				
5	Cast: Oliver Platt as David Goodson, Kenya Brome as Vamiel, Venida Evans as Mambo Delaruse, Tom Detrik, Jasha Godschilde, Ezra Knight, Margorie St. Juste, Jacqueline Cuscuna, Rika Daniel, and John Kassir as The Crypt Keeper.				
6	"Fare Tonight, Followed By Increasing Clottiness"	George Zarr	Andrew Joffe	Tales from the Crypt	35:46
6	City-wide vampire activity is at record levels! Every cab driver in town is on the alert. Poor Bhaya—a recent immigrant to this fair land (and low man on the cabbie totem pole) -- draws the notorious Gravesmoor section for his nightshift. When he picks up an implacable vampire hunter for a fare, Bhaya finds himself in for a wild ride through a hellish night. It is on this evil night that Bhaya learns the real truth about vampires—that they are the lousiest tippers of all! But will Bhaya survive long enough to pass on this wisdom to his fellow hack drivers? The weather out there certainly doesn't look favorable for the living!				
6	NOTE: This episode was previously adapted as a first season episode of Tales from the Cryptkeeper which was simply titled Fare Tonight.				
6	Cast: Keith David as Dr. Egbert Fleagle, Aasif Mandvi as Bhaya Baniswati, Glenn Zarr as Wiper/Ahmed, Andrew Joffe as Sapirstein/the Vampire Union Leader, George Zarr as Vito, Leah Applebaum as Matilda the Waitress, John Kassir as The Crypt Keeper, and Alissa Hunnicutt as the series announcer.				
7	"Carrion Death"	Brian Smith	James Patrick Kelly	Tales from the Crypt	41:17
7	Former high school English teacher and current convict for armed robbery "Professor" Wall has a clear goal — never to return to the confines of the institutions (scholarly and otherwise) that have made his life a hell of banality and mediocrity. But sometimes a simple walk to a distinct destination isn't so uncomplicated after all — especially when the path leads through mirages, deadly illusions, and a merciless desert wasteland of greed and desperation.				
7	NOTE: This story was previously adapted as a third season episode of HBO's Tales from the Crypt.				
7	Cast: Campbell Scott as Wall, Rafael Ferrer as Warden/Coyote, Kevin Townley as Elbert/Vulture, John Kolvenbach as Jerry/Vulture, Todd Cummings as Gooley Devore, Sarah Provost as Doris/Ant, Peter Francis James as Miguel/Coyote, John Kassir as The Crypt Keeper, and Alissa Hunnicutt as the series announcer.				
8	"By the Fright of the Silvery Moon"	George Zarr	Raquel Starace, Jack Wohl	Tales from the Crypt	35:59
8	When animals and residents of Las Luzes, New Mexico begin being mutilated by a mysterious beast, the town sheriff (John Ritter) is forced to investigate.				
8	NOTE: The version of this episode that was originally available on the internet included closing credits which were omitted from the CD release.				
8	Cast: John Ritter as Sheriff Jim Thorton, Robbert Pruitt as Deputy Frank Phile, Peter Waldren as Alec/The Poppa Alien/The Creature, Anne Bobby as Sarah/The Momma Alien, Beng Spies as Steven, Kate Simses as Linda, Allissa Hunnicutt as the News Woman/Baby Alien/Series Announcer, Leah Applebaum as Terry, Laurissa James as Paula, and John Kassir as The Crypt Keeper.				

== Additional credits ==
Associate Producer: Laurissa James
Sound Design: John Colucci
Series Story Editor: Tony Daniel
Live Foley SFX by Sue Zizza and David Shinn
Sound Engineers: Jane Pipik and Miles B. Smith
"Tales From The Crypt" series theme composed by Danny Elfman
Lyrics by Jack Wohl
Arrangement of series theme and original score by Ohad Talmor
