= Michael Z. Williamson =

American author (born 1967)

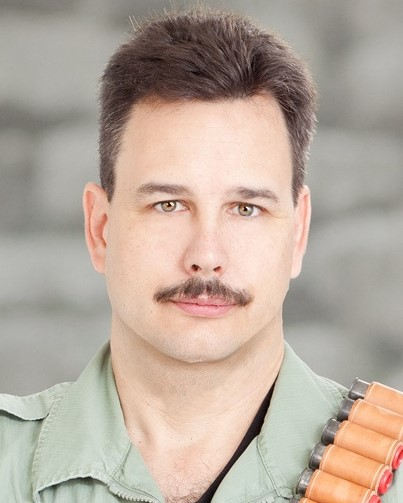
- Williamson in 2011
- Born: 1967 (age 58–59); Birkenhead, England
- Occupation: Author
- Writing career
- Genres: Science fiction, military science fiction, military fiction, political thrillers
- Website: michaelzwilliamson.com

Michael Z. Williamson (born 1967) is an American military science fiction and military fiction author best known for his libertarian-themed Freehold series published by Baen Books. Between 2004 and 2016, Williamson published eight Freehold novels, exploring military and political themes as well as first contact with alien beings. This was followed by the Forged in Blood (2017) and Freehold: Resistance (2019) anthologies, consisting of short stories taking place in the Freehold universe, some by Williamson and some by other authors, including Larry Correia, Tony Daniel, Tom Kratman and Brad R. Torgersen.

Work outside the Freehold universe includes The Hero (2004), written with John Ringo, and the time travel story A Long Time Until Now (2014). Short fiction by Williamson includes the story "Soft Casualty", an exploration of psychological warfare which won a readers' choice award organized by Baen Books. Williamson's Wisdom From My Internet, a collection of witticisms and political polemic from the Internet, was nominated for a Hugo Award for Best Related Work in 2015, as part of the Sad Puppies campaign.

As of 2016, Williamson's books had sold half a million copies.

== Biography ==
Williamson was born in 1967 in Birkenhead, England. His family moved to Canada, then to Newark, Ohio, where he graduated from Newark High School in 1985. After high school, he joined the military and served in a support role in the Air Force for 5 years, then in the Air and Army National Guard, for a total of 22 years. Williamson's military career included service with the United States Air Force in deployments in support of Operation Iraqi Freedom. Williamson has three children and is married.

== Freehold books ==
Williamson's first book, Freehold, was released in January 2004 and made #3 on the April 2004 Locus Bestsellers list for science-fiction and fantasy paperbacks. Freehold tells the story of Kendra Pacelli, a young soldier who begins the book in the service of a world-dominant, authoritarian United Nations. Accused of a crime she did not commit, she flees Earth for the Freehold of Grainne where she struggles to adapt to the climate and culture of an ultra-libertarian planet. She eventually joins the Freehold military and fights in a war against a UN invasion. Williamson has remarked that the main character is partially based on himself and his experience immigrating from the UK to Canada and the United States.

Don D'Ammassa criticized Freehold as a political tract with an oversimplified and unrealistic view of humanity calling it a "very long but frankly not very entertaining diatribe". Michael M. Jones of SF Site conversely called Williamson's portrayal of a libertarian society "sound and believable" and described the book as "a satisfactory debut". Ginger Armstrong of Kliatt called Freehold a "highly readable SF adventure" with "a strong female protagonist". Carolyn Cushman of Locus noted heavy emphasis on the exposition of Libertarian ideology with plotting and pacing taking a back seat but described the novel as "amazingly entertaining".

Many of Williamson's other works are set in the universe established in Freehold. One is Contact with Chaos (2009) where humanity has first contact with alien beings. This becomes a further source of conflict between the United Nations and the Freeholders. In a review of the book, Joseph T. Major praised Williamson for refraining from heavy-handed political messages and instead creating "a diverse, varied human interplanetary society ... trying to understand an exotic, alternative nonhuman society". Other novels set in the Freehold universe include Better to Beg Forgiveness... (2007) which Mark Lardas of the Galveston Daily News praised as an "exciting and violent adventure" and Rogue (2011) which he described as Williamson setting "a new, higher standard for himself". The novel Do Unto Others (2010) made the Wall Street Journal best-seller list in hardcover science fiction and Angeleyes (2016) sold in more than 100,000 copies.

Williamson was the editor of Forged in Blood, which was released in September 2017. The book is set in Williamson's Freehold universe and he also wrote or co-wrote five of its 16 stories; other contributors included Larry Correia, Tony Daniel, and Tom Kratman. The stories are linked as they trace the history of a single sword, from its forging in Japan in the third century BC through to Williamson's Freehold of Grainne in the 24th century. Mark Lardas praised the authors for creating a coherent anthology while attempting "something original [by] telling a story through an object." He described the result as an "engaging book". The science fiction review magazine Tangent described the work as a celebration of "soldiers and their tools" that is satisfying to those for whom that premise appeals. A further anthology, Freehold: Resistance, was released in December 2019. Reviewers praised the tight braiding together of the different contributions to form "a mosaic novel masquerading as an anthology".

== Other works ==
Among works not set in the Freehold universe is Williamson's second novel, The Hero (2004), which was written with John Ringo and made the Locus Bestseller list in February 2006. The book is a part of the Legacy of the Aldenata series. It appeared in German as Invasion – Heldentaten and in Russian as Герой. Williamson has also written the Target: Terror (2004–2005) military fiction series which is set in the world of the Target: Terror arcade game. His stand-alone novels include the time-travel story A Long Time Until Now (2014) which was praised for its characterization and survivalist elements. As of 2016, Williamson's books had sold half a million copies.

Williamson has contributed short fiction to numerous anthologies, including many which take place in the Valdemar and Elemental Masters shared universes created by Mercedes Lackey. He has also contributed stories to the Heroes in Hell shared universe and to many anthologies of military science fiction published by Baen. An anthology of Williamson's short fiction, Tour of Duty (2013), was reviewed by Publishers Weekly which singled out "The Humans call it Duty" as "strong" and "Desert Blues" as "subtly haunting".

In 2015, Baen Books released an anthology, The Year's Best Military SF & Space Opera, which was described by Don Sakers of Analog as "long overdue". Baen Books invited readers to vote for the best story from the volume. Sakers commented: "We can only hope that the award, like the anthology, will become an annual event." Williamson won the readers' poll for the short story "Soft Casualty" and was presented with an award at Dragon Con. The story deals with psychological warfare as an occupying force encounters harsh resistance tactics.

Williamson's Wisdom from My Internet (2014), a collection of witticisms and political polemic from the Internet, was nominated for a Hugo Award for Best Related Work in 2015, as a result of the Sad Puppies ballot manipulation campaign. Hugo voters ranked Wisdom from My Internet below "No Award". Williamson himself stated while the poll was underway that he had voted for no award in all categories, including the one in which his own work appeared.

== Themes ==
Williamson was recruited as an author by ex-soldier and publisher Jim Baen who "recruited a batch of younger, like-minded authors from similar backgrounds"; Williamson, David Drake, John Ringo and Tom Kratman. Commonalities in the works of these authors include the setting of a civilization in decline with heroes battling against conventional wisdom. John Clute comments in The Encyclopedia of Science Fiction that a pattern running through the works of Williamson is a fight to maintain freedom against external enemies with the heroes adhering to libertarian principles. Clute notes the frequent presence of female heroes in Williamson's works and feminist critic Liz Bourke describes Williamson's treatment of female characters as "less clearly marginalizing" than that of John Ringo and Tom Kratman.

Blair Nicholson, in a doctoral thesis from the University of Waikato, points out commonalities in the authorial stances of Williamson and David Weber who both emphasize that in military science fiction, the hypothesized military environment must be depicted in realistic detail down to details of strategy and tactics. According to Williamson the work should then seek to "explore the proposed system, and its interactions with the people – soldiers and civilians – involved". Nicholson notes that Williamson depicts the United Nations as an enemy, and particularly so in his Freehold (2004) novel, where the United Nations appears as an authoritarian oppressor. This depiction of the United Nations has parallels in the Marine in Space series by Ian Douglas and in the works of Tom Kratman and is reflective of a negative right-wing popular opinion on the institution.

== Works ==
=== Freehold Universe ===
==== Grainne War/Aftermath ====
1. Freehold (Baen, January 2004, ISBN 0-7434-7179-2)
2. The Weapon (Baen, August 2005, ISBN 1-4165-0894-5)
3. Contact with Chaos (Baen, April 2009, ISBN 978-1-4165-9154-2)
4. Rogue (Baen, September 2011, ISBN 978-1-4391-3462-7)
5. Angeleyes (Baen, November 2016, ISBN 978-1-4767-8186-0)

==== Ripple Creek ====
1. Better to Beg Forgiveness... (Baen, November 2007, ISBN 1-4165-5508-0)
2. Do Unto Others (Baen, August 2010, ISBN 978-1-4391-3383-5)
3. When Diplomacy Fails... (Baen, August 2012, ISBN 978-1-4516-3790-8)

==== Freehold anthologies ====
These are anthologies containing stories set in the Freehold universe by multiple authors.

- Forged in Blood (Baen, September 2017, ISBN 978-1-4814-8270-7, as editor and author)
  - "Broken Spirit" with Dale C. Flowers (short fiction)
  - "Choices and Consequences" (short fiction)
  - "The Day the Tide Rolled In" with Leo Champion (short fiction)
  - "The Reluctant Heroine" (short fiction)
  - "The Thin Green Line" (short fiction)
- Freehold: Resistance (Baen, December 2019, ISBN 9781982124236, as editor and author)
- Freehold: Defiance (Baen, May 2021, as editor and author)

=== Target: Terror series ===
A military sniper adventure series set in the world of the Target: Terror arcade game.

- The Scope of Justice (Avon, July 2004, ISBN 0-06-056524-1)
- Targets of Opportunity (Avon, March 2005, ISBN 0-06-056525-X)
- Confirmed Kill (Avon, September 2005, ISBN 0-06-056526-8)

=== Legacy of the Aldenata ===
Set in the Legacy of the Aldenata series created by John Ringo.

- The Hero with John Ringo (Baen, June 2004, ISBN 0-7434-8827-X)

=== Collections ===
These are collections on Williamson's fiction and non-fiction.

- Tour of Duty: Stories and Provocations (short story/essay collection, Baen, August 2013, ISBN 978-1-4516-3905-6). Stories original to this collection include:
  - "Misfits" with Gail Sanders (short fiction)
  - "One Night in Baghdad" (poem)
  - "Port Call" (short fiction)
- Tide of Battle (short story/essay collection, Baen, July 2018, ISBN 978-1-4814-8336-0). Stories original to this collection include:
  - "How Sweet the Sound" with Morgen Kirby (short fiction)
  - "Off the Cuff" (short fiction)

=== Short fiction published by Baen ===
- "The Humans Called It Duty" in Future Weapons of War (Baen, March 2007, ISBN 1-4165-2112-7)
- "The Price" in Citizens (Baen, May 2010, ISBN 978-1-61824-764-3)
- "Battle's Tide" in Exiled: Clan of the Claw (Baen, August 2011, ISBN 978-1-4391-3441-2)
- "The Brute Force Approach" in Baen Books Free Stories 2011 (Baen, August 2011)
- "Soft Casualty" in Baen Books: Free Stories 2014 (Baen, February 2014)
- "How Do You Solve a Problem Like Grandpa?" in Black Tide Rising (Baen, June 2016, ISBN 978-1-4767-8151-8)
- "Starhome" in Baen Books: Free Stories 2016 (Baen, 2016)
- "Hate in the Darkness" in Star Destroyers (Baen, March 2018, ISBN 978-1-4814-8309-4)
- "Inhale to the King, Baby!" in Voices of the Fall (Baen, March 2019, ISBN 978-1-4814-8382-7)

=== Short fiction published by DAW ===
- "Naught but Duty" in Crossroads and Other Tales of Valdemar (DAW, December 2005, ISBN 0-7564-0325-1)
- "The Sword Dancer" in Moving Targets and Other Tales of Valdemar (DAW, December 2008, ISBN 978-0-7564-0528-1)
- "Wounded Bird" in Changing the World: All-New Tales of Valdemar (DAW, December 2009, ISBN 978-0-7564-0580-9)
- "The Groom's Price" with Gail Sanders (DAW, December 2010, ISBN 978-0-7564-0633-2)
- "The Bride's Task" with Gail Sanders in Under the Vale and Other Tales of Valdemar (DAW, December 2011, ISBN 978-0-7564-0696-7)
- "A Flower Grows in Whitechapel" with Gail Sanders in Elemental Magic (DAW, December 2012, ISBN 978-0-7564-0787-2)
- "A Peony Amongst Roses" with Gail Sanders in Elementary (DAW, December 2013, ISBN 978-0-7564-0959-3)
- "A Fire in the Glass" with Jessica Schlenker in Crucible: All-New Tales of Valdemar (DAW, December 2015, ISBN 978-0-7564-0902-9)
- "Medley" with Jessica Schlenker in Tempest: All-New Tales of Valdemar (DAW, December 2016, ISBN 978-0-7564-0903-6)

=== Short fiction published by others ===
- "Heads You Lose" in Lawyers in Hell (Kerlak Enterprises, August 2011, ISBN 978-1-937035-01-3)
- "A Hard Day at the Office" in Rogues in Hell (Perseid, July 2012, ISBN 978-0-9851668-7-8)
- "The Digital Kid" in 2113: Stories Inspired by the Music of Rush (ECW Press, April 2016, ISBN 978-1-77041-292-7)

=== Other works ===
- A Long Time Until Now (Baen, February 2014, ISBN 978-1-4767-8033-7)
- That Was Now, This is Then (Baen, December 2021, ISBN 978-1-9821-2576-9)
- Wisdom From My Internet (Patriarchy Press, December 2014, ISBN 978-1-943801-01-5)
