= Tyneside flat =

Form of British domestic housing

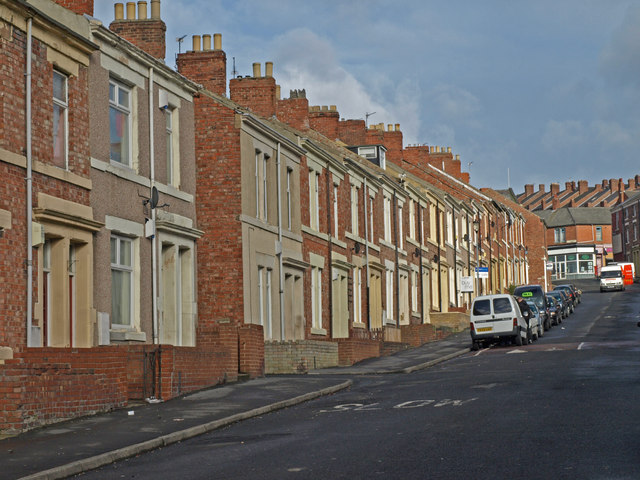
Northbourne Street in Gateshead

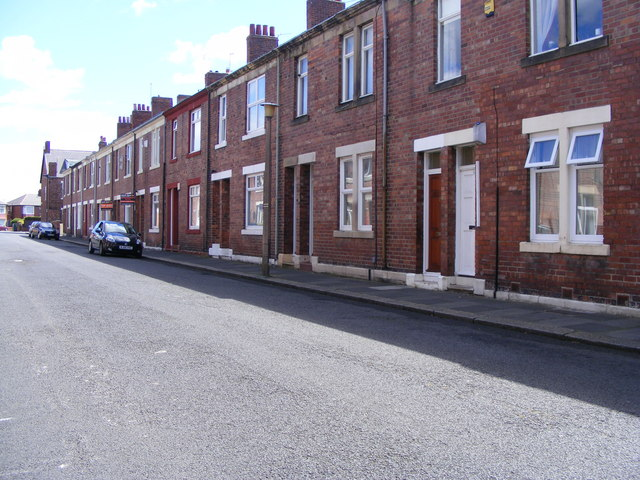
Tyneside flats in Wallsend. Note the pairs of doors

Tyneside flats are a form of UK domestic housing found primarily on Tyneside, including in Newcastle upon Tyne, Gateshead, North Tyneside and South Tyneside. The first known example of this type was constructed in the 1860s.

They are pairs of single-storey flats within a two-storey terrace, a common type of Victorian housing in urban England. Their distinctive feature is their use of two separate front doors onto the street, each door leading to a single flat. The upper flat has a stairway leading from directly behind its front door, the other has a hallway beneath this, with the space below the stairway forming a small storage space. From the outside, the two front doors appear in adjacent pairs between the houses' windows.

In contrast, many similar flats, elsewhere in England, have a single shared front door, which opens into a communal lobby with interior doors to each flat.

Housing of this period was often constructed as a local mixture of two-storey terraced houses, and single-storey Tyneside flats. The paired doors are the only external indicator of which type a building is. There is usually a single upstairs window spanning both doors.

== Description and layout ==
Tyneside flats may vary in size, usually having one or two bedrooms as the lower flat is made slightly smaller by the staircase to upstairs. Some upper flats use the attic space for additional bedrooms and may have three or four bedrooms, spread over two floors, and usually with a dormer window to the front.

The terrace was extended to the rear by an annexe, a typical feature for Victorian terraces, containing a scullery. As was typical for their time, each flat has a small enclosed yard at the rear with an outside toilet or 'netty' . Sometimes the yard was shared. For the upstairs flat, rear access would be by an open or enclosed brick staircase. Compared to the yard of a similar house, the two yards are thus quite small, being half the size, and containing two privies rather than one.

Originally the kitchen was the largest central room, containing a cast iron coal range for cooking, and a smaller scullery was provided in the rear outshot. Water was usually only provided in this scullery, with a Belfast sink and often a separate stove heating a wash copper for laundry, either in the scullery or a separate outhouse. With the adoption of smaller gas cookers rather than coal ranges in the mid-20th century, many of these sculleries were converted as kitchens, so allowing the previous kitchen to become a larger living room.

The type is well-regarded today and is often rented or a first purchase by young professionals and childless couples, seeking an affordable home near a city centre. Although 100–150 years old, their construction standards were generally good and they are considered solid and reliable buildings. Amenities such as electricity, modern plumbing and central heating would have been added in later years. Some Tyneside flats are let to students and sometimes marketed as individual rooms with shared kitchen and bathroom.

== History ==
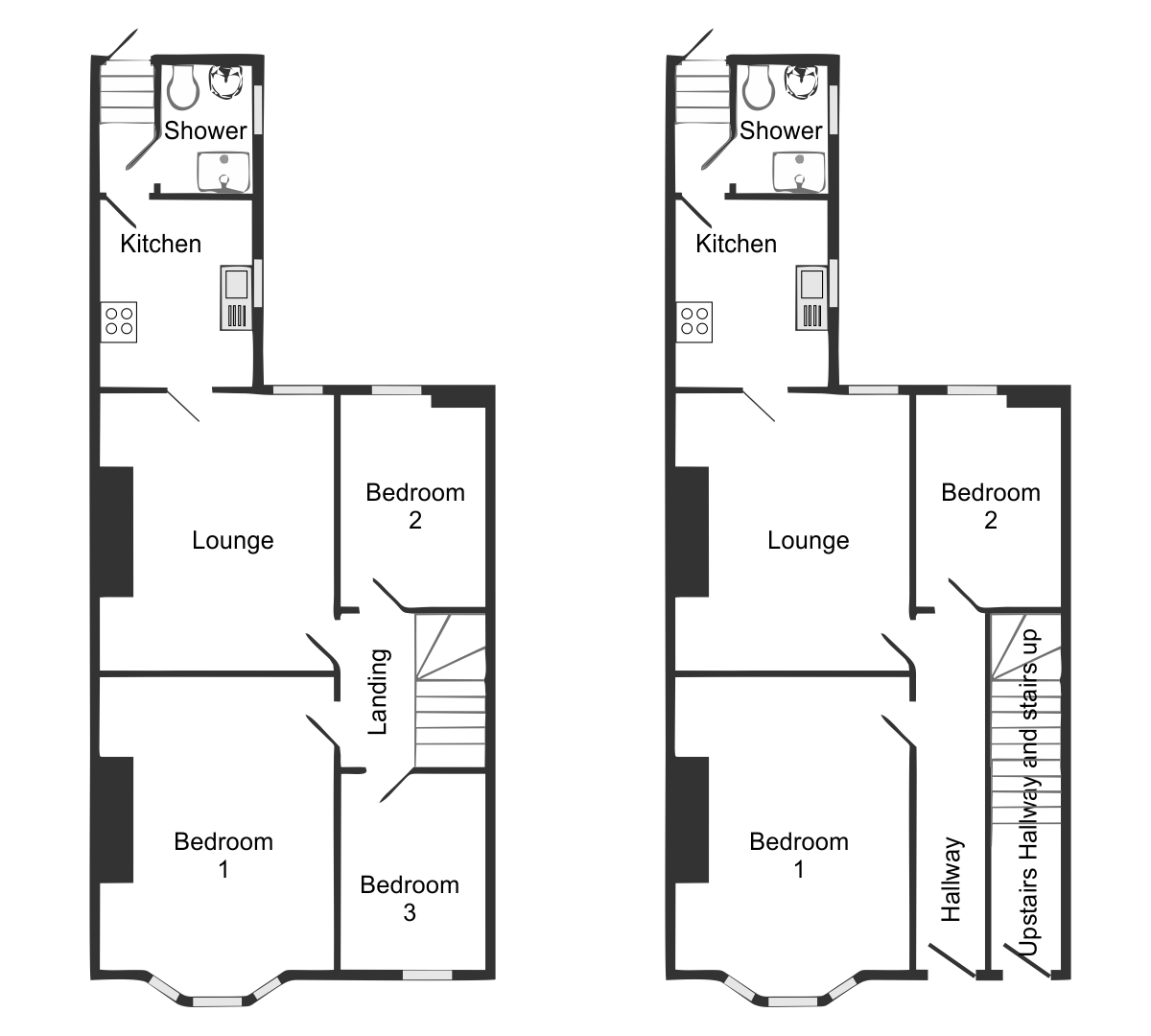
Representative floorplans for a pair of flats, upper floor on the left, ground floor on the right. Modern bathroom conversions to the rear.

The type appeared in the 1860s, in the mid-Victorian period. The first Tyneside flats have been claimed as the Shipcote Estate in Gateshead, built by William Affleck in 1866. Most were built from the 1870s until the outbreak of the First World War in 1914, with some built post-1918, usually including a purpose-built bathroom and kitchen in the rear annexe. The 1870s saw a great increase in the populations of both Newcastle and Gateshead, driven by the expanding industrialisation along the Tyne. This was also the 'Age of Collectivism', when there was an increasing interest by local Corporations in improving public health by the provision of better sanitation, enforced by legislation such as the Public Health Acts of 1875 and 1848.

Tyneside flats resembled other local houses: in the first examples their front doors opened directly onto the street, particularly those in Gateshead. Later Edwardian examples, particularly around Jesmond and Gosforth, developed first small front gardens and then bay windows with stone details.

After the First World War mass council housing began to be provided in the form of detached or terraced properties and Tyneside flats fell out of favour.

After World War II, the maisonette developed as a similar form of housing, as flats above each other but with no shared entrance. Many legal definitions of these later maisonettes also encompass the Tyneside flat. Some Tyneside flats were also built in the same period.

== Modern conversions ==
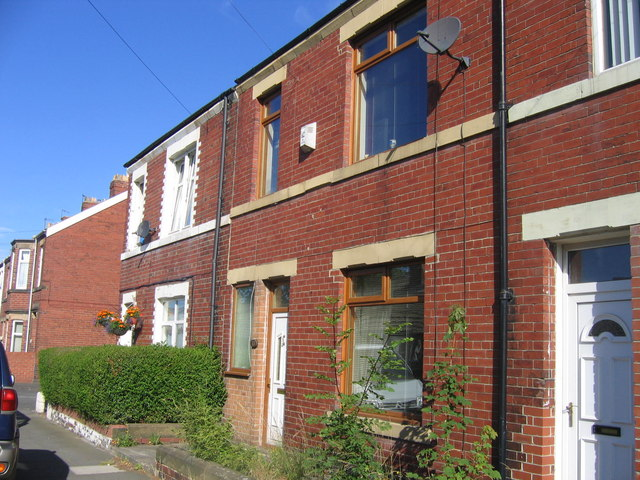
Modern conversion of two flats to one house. Note the partially bricked door now forming a window

In the 1960s and 1970s, many had their rear outshot extended to use the ground area previously used by the privy. This allowed space for both a kitchen and bathroom, although small, in the outshot. Their kitchen and bathroom would be considered small by modern standards, but typical of the period. Rear access to the upstairs flat was retained by either a compact brickwork stairway now running sideways across the end of the outshot, or by a more compact steel staircase. This improvement was often aided by generous council grants, who saw the improvement of existing housing stock as a better investment than new-build. Other flats had their rear bedroom divided to create a small, windowless bathroom within the main part of the building.

During the 1980s and 1990s, a shortage of larger properties in popular areas and the availability of affordable mortgages led to some Tyneside flats being converted into two-storey houses. This is a relatively simple conversion. In most cases the original door to upstairs was partially bricked-up and replaced by a window.

== Legal issues ==
The legal status of a Tyneside flat, and the responsibilities between their landlords, is complicated by their interdependency. The upper flat shelters the lower flat, the lower flat supports the upper flat. This has led to specific legal schemes, known as Tyneside flat, criss-cross, or crossover lease arrangements.

Under a Tyneside flat scheme, each flat tenant, even if holding the freehold of their own flat, is made the landlord (and thus reciprocally the tenant) of the other. This allows the responsibilities to be enforced legally, without requiring the existence of an external landlord or management committee or homeowner association over the whole building.

In the South Tyneside area, leases of this type are less common due to the history of the flats, which were often owned by large employers or by the same family, who lived in one and rented out the other. This means that the tenure arrangement can vary from one flat to the next, with some being freehold and others leasehold.

== See also ==
- Cottage flat, a later Scottish development, where mirrored pairs of pairs are arranged as 'four in a block' terraces.
- Flying freehold, some of the legal issues involved in overlapping freeholds.
