= They're Made Out of Meat =

- Short story by Terry Bisson
- Language: English
- Genre: Science fiction

Publication
- Published in: OMNI
- Publication type: Magazine
- Publication date: April 1991
- Publication place: United States

"They're Made Out of Meat" is a short story by American writer Terry Bisson. It was originally published in OMNI. It consists entirely of dialogue between two characters. Bisson's website hosts a theatrical adaptation. A film adaptation won the Grand Prize at the Seattle Science Fiction Museum's 2006 film festival.

The story was collected in the 1993 anthology Bears Discover Fire and Other Stories, and has circulated widely on the Internet, which Bisson found "flattering". It has been quoted in cognitive, cosmological, and philosophical scholarship.

== Plot ==
The two characters are intelligent beings capable of traveling faster than light, on a mission to "contact, welcome and log in any and all sentient races or multibeings in this quadrant of the Universe." Bisson's stage directions represent them as "two lights moving like fireflies among the stars" on a projection screen. One of them tells the incredulous other about the recent discovery of carbon-based lifeforms "made up entirely of meat". After conversing briefly about it, they both deem such beings and communication with them too bizarre and agree to "erase the records and forget the whole thing", marking the Solar System "unoccupied".

== Film adaptations ==
=== They're Made out of Meat (2005) ===
In 2005, Stephen O'Regan wrote and directed a live film adaptation starring Tom Noonan and Ben Bailey. The film was made as a final project for the New York Film Academy. The main action takes place inside a diner full of teenagers in Staten Island, New York. The music for the film was scored by Bob Reynolds.

=== They're Made out of Meat (2010) ===
Jeff Frumess and Trevor Scott produced a version in 2010. They added the character of a homeless conspiracy theorist with an original score by musician Sam Belkin. The film was shot at Hartsdale station in Westchester County, New York.

=== Meat (2021) ===
Masha Maksimova developed a version in Cinemiracle format, a triple split-screen process, as a student project at the Berlin University of Applied Sciences in the communication design course. The dialogue is conducted by two telepathic humanoid aliens and the thoughts are visualised by found-footage collages.

== See also ==
- Carbon chauvinism
- Zoo hypothesis
- Fables for Robots – a collection of short stories where humans and other organic life are looked upon similarly
- Silly Asses - a 1958 Isaac Asimov short story where aliens refuse to make contact with Earth
