= Future War (anthology) =

1999 science fiction anthology

- Cover of first edition
- Editors: Jack Dann and Gardner Dozois
- Cover artist: Chris Moore
- Language: English
- Series: Jack Dann and Gardner Dozois Ace anthology series
- Genre: Science fiction
- Publisher: Ace Books
- Publication date: 1999
- Publication place: United States
- Media type: Print (paperback)
- Pages: x, 261
- ISBN: 0-441-00639-6
- Preceded by: Nanotech
- Followed by: Armageddons

Future War is a themed anthology of science fiction short works edited by American writers Jack Dann and Gardner Dozois. It was first published in paperback by Ace Books in August 1999. It was reissued as an ebook by Baen Books in June 2013.

The book collects ten novelettes and short stories by various science fiction authors, together with a preface by the editors.

== Contents ==
- "Preface"
- "Second Variety" (Philip K. Dick)
- "Salvador" (Lucius Shepard)
- "Floating Dogs" (Ian McDonald)
- "The Private War of Private Jacob" (Joe Haldeman)
- "Spirey and the Queen" (Alastair Reynolds)
- "A Dry, Quiet War" (Tony Daniel)
- "Rorvik's War" (Geoffrey A. Landis)
- "Second Skin" (Paul J. McAuley)
- "The War Memorial" (Allen Steele)
- "A Special Kind of Morning" (Gardner Dozois)
