= Forged in Blood =

Science-fiction anthology

First edition

Forged in Blood is a science-fiction anthology edited by Michael Z. Williamson and published in September 2017 by Baen Books. The book consists of 16 short stories tracing the story of a single sword. The first story takes place in feudal Japan and the book continues in chronological order into the future of Williamson's Freehold universe. Five of the stories are wholly or partly by Williamson and the rest by other authors, including Larry Correia, Tony Daniel and Tom Kratman.

== Reception ==
Voters in the Preditors and Editors Readers’ Poll named the book the year's best anthology.

Mark Lardas of the Galveston Daily News praised the authors for creating a coherent anthology while attempting "something original [by] telling a story through an object." He described the result as an "engaging book" that "[f]ans of combat science fiction will find ... irresistible.

The science fiction review magazine Tangent described the work as a celebration of "soldiers and their tools" that is satisfying to those for whom that premise appeals. The review also noted that the "entire anthology consists of stories in which individuals solve problems with violence (or its threat) in a world in which sweet-talking is inadequate to the present threat".

The story "Thicker than Blood" by Kacey Ezell was selected for inclusion in the anthology The Year's Best Military and Adventure SF, Volume 4, published in June 2018. The story went on to win the Year’s Best Military and Adventure SF Readers’ Choice Award announced at Dragoncon on September 1, 2018.

== Contents ==
The stories are linked as they trace the history of a single sword, from its forging in Japan in the third century BC through to Williamson's Freehold of Grainne in the 24th century, with each episode related from the sword's perspective and with it as the main character.

The first two stories are set in feudal Japan while the third is set in 1904 at the Battle of Port Arthur. The last nine stories are set in the future.

- "The Tachi" by Zachary Hill
- "Musings of a Hermit" by Larry Correia
- "Stronger than Steel" by Michael Massa
- "He Who Lives Wins" by John F. Holmes
- "Souvenirs" by Rob Reed
- "Broken Spirit" by Michael Z. Williamson and Dale C. Flowers
- "Okoyyūki" by Tom Kratman
- "The Day the Tide Rolled In" by Michael Z. Williamson and Leo Champion
- "Ripper" by Peter Grant
- "Case Hardened" by Christopher L. Smith
- "Magnum Opus" by Jason Cordova
- "Lovers" by Tony Daniel
- "The Reluctant Heroine" by Michael Z. Williamson
- "The Thin Green Line" by Michael Z. Williamson
- "Family Over Blood" by Kacey Ezell
- "Choices and Consequences by Michael Z. Williamson
