= Flying freehold =

English legal term

Flying freehold is an English legal term to describe a freehold which overhangs or underlies another freehold. Common cases include a room situated above a shared passageway in a semi-detached house, or a balcony which extends over a neighbouring property.

In the law of England and Wales, originally a freehold property included the ground, everything below it and everything above it. (Note: The principle was cuius est solum eius est usque ad coelum et ad inferos (Latin: "he who owns the land owns everything reaching up to the very heavens and down to the depths of the earth"). However, in Bernstein -v- Skyviews [1978] QB 479, Griffiths J held that the rights of a landowner extend "to such height as is necessary for the ordinary use and enjoyment of his land and the structures upon it". Thus, for example, aircraft flying at a normal height do not trespass. Rights to minerals and resources may also be excluded. For example, treasure and any deposits of gold, silver, oil or natural gas belong to the Crown.) By the 13th century, the courts had begun to accept that one freehold could overhang or underlie another. This concept was settled law by the 16th century.

Flying freeholds are viewed as a title defect, because they rarely have adequate rights of support from the structure beneath or rights of access to make repairs. This is an issue if, for example, scaffolding needs to be erected on the land beneath the flying freehold: the landowner's consent will be required and he may refuse, or want to charge a premium. If the work is necessary it may be possible to obtain a court order under the Access to Neighbouring Land Act 1992, but there are costs and uncertainties involved, and the situation could be even worse if the structure beneath is unregistered land and the identity of the owner is unclear.

There is a counterpart situation called a creeping freehold where similar issues arise. A creeping freehold is where, for example a basement or cellar belonging to one freehold underlies a different freehold at ground level. Works may be impossible without the consent of the freeholder above if any works could affect it, or need access to it.

These concerns mean that mortgage lenders and other finance providers usually want more detail on the property before approving mortgages etc. The approach by lenders varies greatly. Some lenders are wary of flying freeholds while others appreciate that this is a common occurrence (particularly in older terrace properties) and act accordingly. When considering a mortgage application for a property with flying freehold the extent to which the property extends over a neighbouring property may also be considered before approving an application and may result in a lender requiring a title indemnity policy, which is a kind of insurance against problems arising from the flying freehold, or even demand that a deed of right of access be purchased.

Because of the various problems, nowadays flying freeholds are not created willingly, long leases being used instead.

== See also ==
- Tyneside flat, an arrangement of two flats, one above the other. These often involve reciprocal arrangements for the freeholds.
