= The Darfsteller =

- Novelette by Walter M. Miller, Jr.
- Illustrator: H. R. Van Dongen
- Country: United States
- Language: English
- Genre: Science fiction novelette

Publication
- Published in: Astounding Science Fiction
- Publication type: Periodical
- Publisher: Street & Smith
- Media type: Print (Magazine)
- Publication date: January 1955
- Pages: 56
- Award: Hugo Award for Best Novelette (1955)

"The Darfsteller" is a 1955 science fiction novelette by American writer Walter M. Miller, Jr., which won the first Hugo Award for Best Novelette. It was originally published in Astounding Science Fiction of January 1955.

It is the 21st century story of an old stage actor who has become a theater janitor in order to remain near "show biz". The theater has been overtaken by robot actors, made to look like humans, which act out plays under the direction of each venue's central computer. This "Maestro" runs the show, accommodating the kinds of factors which real actors would contend with: audience reactions, failing mechanical actors (when they are broken or one of the tapes that they get their programming from is worn), and other inconstant factors.

The old actor dreams up a scheme to get himself back on stage, despite the prejudice against real acting. He destroys one of the robot's tapes, and since he knows the part from his previous career, he is the only way the show can go on.

The old actor's problem is that he has always been a darfsteller (likely a portmanteau of "Darsteller", German for "actor/actress", with "darf", inflected form of "dürfen", "to be at liberty to do something") which the narrator explains was a "self-directed actor... the undirectable portrayer whose acting welled from unconscious sources with no external strings", generally hated by directors even when they performed excellently. The meaning of the story comes from the point that he cannot just walk onto the stage and deliver lines; as a "Darfsteller", he must live them, and transform himself into his role, and once that process begins, it is difficult to stop it.
