= Saint Leibowitz and the Wild Horse Woman =

1997 novel by Walter M. Miller, Jr.

- Cover of 1997 Bantam Dell Pub Group paperback edition.
- Author: Walter M. Miller Jr. Terry Bisson
- Language: English
- Genre: Science fiction
- Publisher: Bantam Dell Publishing Group
- Publication place: United States
- Media type: Print (paperback)
- ISBN: 978-0-553-10704-3
- OCLC: 36581949
- Dewey Decimal: 813/.54 21
- LC Class: PS3563.I4215 S25 1997
- Preceded by: A Canticle for Leibowitz

Saint Leibowitz and the Wild Horse Woman (1997) is a science fiction novel by American writer Walter M. Miller Jr. It is a follow-up to Miller's 1959 book A Canticle for Leibowitz. Miller wrote the majority of the novel before his death in 1996; the rest was completed based on Miller's notes and outlines by Terry Bisson.

The novel is set chronologically some eighty years after the events of the second part of A Canticle for Leibowitz, "Fiat Lux" (c. 3254 AD).

In the novel, the city of New Rome has been captured and allowed to decay by the Empire of Texarkana, led by the emperor Filpeo Harq. The Papacy, in exile from New Rome, now resides in the city of Valana. The story chronicles the plan of a cardinal-deacon and his closest allies to unite the remaining independent nations in North America against the Empire, and to restore power to the Church.

== Plot summary ==
The main character of the novel is Brother Blacktooth "Nimmy" St. George, a monk at Leibowitz Abbey located in the desert north of modern day Santa Fe, New Mexico. Brother Blacktooth, born a Grasshopper Nomad but having run away and joined the monastery in his youth, is fluent in many languages including the three Nomadic dialects and Churchspeak. Unsatisfied with his job as a translator of ancient texts, and haunted by his roots as a Nomad, Blacktooth becomes increasingly restless. He feels pulled between the two societies: that of the church, and that of the wanderer. He still possesses a Nomad Spirituality believing he has seen the Wild Horse Woman and holds Saint Leibowitz as his favourite Saint after the Holy Virgin. Blacktooth wishes to be released from his monastic vows. The Abbot of Leibowitz, Jarad, insists on using Blacktooth's unique linguistic skills to build a collection of Nomad language texts to help bring the Nomads to civilisation. Visiting Cardinal Elia Brownpony (called the Red Deacon since he was never ordained as a priest) decides to enlist Nimmy's services. Brownpony requires a translator in his travels in order to deal diplomatically with the unruly Nomad hordes who occupy the Great Plains: the WildDogs, the Grasshoppers, and the Jackrabbits. During the conquest of Hannegan II the Jackrabbit horde was subdued along with a minority of Grasshopper clans, having since been forced to settle as farmers and abandon their nomadic ways. Blacktooth was born into one of these subjugated Grasshopper farmer families who settled near Danfer (Denver, Colorado). Since the time of the Hannegan's conquest there has been no Lord of the Three Hordes, or "Qaesach dri Vordar" in Nomadic.

Brownpony and Nimmy set off to return to Valana (where Brownpony runs the Secretariat of Extraordinary Ecclesiastical Concerns, or SEEC) along with Brownpony's other servants: Wooshin (aka "Axe"), a mysterious warrior from the Orient, Chur Hongan Osle (aka "Holy Madness"), his Nomadic driver, and Father Ombroz e'Laiden, a disgraced priest and missionary to the Nomads. Soon afterward, the reigning Pope Linus VII dies. A conclave of cardinals is called in Valana to elect a new one. The Church had been exiled from the holy city of New Rome (modern day St. Louis, Missouri) in previous decades because of an invasion by the Emperor (or "Hannegan") of Texark. As a result, all papal affairs were conducted in the city of Valana (present day Colorado Springs), beyond the reach of the Texark empire.

During their journey, the group (specifically, Holy Madness) have a divine vision. The vision is of the Night Hag, who only appears to a man in order to announce the death of someone else. It is from her appearance that Brownpony infers the death of the Pope. The Night Hag is one of the three avatars of the Nomad goddess, Open Sky. Open Sky's other two avatars are The Buzzard of Battle and the Wild Horse Woman (or Day Maiden). The Wild Horse Women is said to choose the Qaesach dri Vordar as her husband.

Upon arriving at the settlement of Arch Hollow on the way to Valana, they are accosted by genetically handicapped Gennies or Gleps, escapees from The Valley of the Misborn. After a brief standoff Shard, the leader of the gleps, receives the travellers into his home. Nimmy has occasion to meet Shard's daughter Ædrea, a beautiful Spook (a mutant who is able to pass for healthy). Ædrea steals his rosary and his hand-made musical g'tara to lure him into a cellar. Blacktooth somewhat unwillingly allows himself to be seduced by Ædrea despite the fact that both are forbidden to fraternize: he because of his vows, she because of her genes. They attempt to have sex but find Ædrea is unable due to surgery performed on her when she was a child to prevent her from being raped by marauding Nomads, outlaws or soldiers, leaving her with a tiny vagina. She satisfies Blacktooth with her hand in the dark. During their time in Arch Hollow it is revealed that Chur Hongan is the nephew of the WildDog war sharf and a distant relative of the Hannegans of Texark, themselves having been Nomad outlaws who conquered the city. The group continues to Valana, but Chur Hongan and Father Ombroz depart from the others to return to the WildDog horde.

At the Conclave, Brownpony surprises the assembled cardinals by openly admitting that he is of Nomad ancestry. His mother was a Nomad woman raped by a Texark soldier, who then abandoned him at birth to be raised by nuns. He makes this confession in order to embarrass a Texark scholar who was then present. Unfortunately, immediately after the outburst, a sickly student marches into the auditorium and attempts to assassinate the very same Texark infiltrator. Given the timing, it is widely presumed that Brownpony was behind the assassination, so attempts are made on the lives of Blacktooth and Brownpony. The violence of the Conclave escalates to a breaking point. The citizens of Valana, impatient for a new Pope, sequester the Conclave until the rival factions of cardinals (some allied with the Church, others with Texark) elect a new Pope. Under duress, the Conclave elects Amen Specklebird, a cryptic and oracular vagrant, who doubles as a cult icon for the Valanian people. Amen's rotten election marks the first stage in a series of events that escalate tensions between Texark and the Church. During this time Blacktooth discovers that Ædrea is coming and going between the SEEC in Valana and her home, but he is forbidden by Brownpony from seeing her. Blacktooth, having fallen in love with Ædrea, begrudgingly disobeys his master and seeks her out anyway. The two rendezvous at a waterfall outside of Valana and engage in oral sex. Afterwards Blacktooth is shocked to see Ædrea take his semen and manually rub it into her vagina. She reveals she did the same thing in the dark after their previous encounter in the cellar and is now late for her period, believing giving birth will undo the surgery performed on her. Blacktooth also discovers the purpose of her frequent trips is ferrying guns from the SEEC to the gennies in Arch Hollow.

Pope Amen appoints Brownpony as Vicar Apostolic to the Three Hordes and ordains him as a bishop in spite of his protests that he has no calling. Brownpony's ally Cardinal Sorely Nauwhat from Oregon takes over his role at the SEEC. Brownpony travels to a meeting of the hordes in the WildDog territory and finds that Sharf Brokenfoot has died and Chur Hongan has succeeded him as WildDog sharf. The Nomads ritualisticly consume their deceased leader as part of the funerary traditions and Brownpony is disturbed to find his friend Father e'Laiden partaking. Chur Hongan explains to the Cardinal that he won't be accepted as a shaman to the Nomads unless he receives the blessing of the Wild Horse Woman, which is determined by spending a night in a radioactive crater ("Meldown") the Nomad Weejus women and Bear Spirit men believe is her breeding pit. Chur Hongan tries to assist Brownpony in his trial by alerting him to changes in wind direction to avoid the radiation but he eventually falls asleep after he sees a vision of the Buzzard of Battle. Brownpony survives and doesn't fall ill in the week after the trial and so is accepted by the Nomads as a Christian shaman and ritually married to the Buzzard of Battle, however he begins to experience bouts of illness from the radiation in the following months. Chur Hongan and the Grasshopper sharf Hultor Bram each undergo the same breeding pit trial to determine who will become Lord of the Three Hordes. The Weejus women determine Chur Hongan to be the recipient of the Wild Horse Woman's favour while pronouncing that Hultor Bram has been visited by the Night Hag and will soon die. Chur Hongan is anointed Qaesach dri Vordar and his relative Oxsho becomes the WildDog sharf.

Amen's reign as Pope proves to be short-lived. He makes an abortive attempt to return the Church to New Rome by sending a mission of Nomads and Cardinals east. The convoy is turned away by Texark guardsmen. However, the Nomadic contingent of the convoy, being hungry and unpaid, decides to split from the Papal authority and raze the countryside around New Rome. The Hannegan Filpeo Harq is compelled to come up with solutions to stop the Nomad menace.

Blacktooth travels to New Jerusalem to find a large colony of spooks arming for war with new revolver type firearms. He is informed that Ædrea died during childbirth. Brownpony and Blacktooth travel through Jackrabbit territory controlled by Texark, to organise revolution. Brownpony has an audience with the Hannigan Filpeo Harq, after a tense standoff in his palace Brownpony and blacktooth are arrested and shown off in the local zoo. They are soon released under a suspended sentence of death.

After the mission's failure, Amen controversially resigns as Pope and retreats to his old vagrant's cave overlooking Valana. While cardinals backed by the Hannegan declare the papacy illegitimate, a conclave of Valana clergy declare that Brownpony is Pope. Taking the name Amen II, he organises the nations surrounding Texarkana into resistance designed to overstretch the Texark military.

Meanwhile, Blacktooth is press ganged into the Valana militia, now led by Cardinal Hadala joined with New Jerusalem spooks on a mission to deliver arms to the Watchitah Nation gleps of the Valley of the Misborn. Suspicious Nomad detachments trap the militia between a Texark army and themselves, and an accompanying Cardinal Nauwhat defects to the Texark camp. Blacktooth feels terrible when he unintentially shoots an opposing glep pressed into Texark service, One of Hadala's bodyguards, one of the Pope's Yellow Guards (elite Asian swordsmen), executes Hadala when he realizes that the cardinal has betrayed Brownpony. Blacktooth rescues some cougar cubs, one survives. Blacktooth is able to spend some time with his ancestral Grasshopper tribe who have a new respect for his civilised ways.

Blacktooth rejoins Brownpony, who elevates him to the position of Cardinal, he learns that Ædrea is still alive and the children have been adopted. Ædrea proves herself as a mystical healer at the Leibowitz Monastery. Brownpony declares an effective crusade against the Texark Empire, leading an alliance of Nomads, New Jerusalem Spooks and the Valanian Militia to recapture New Rome and excommunicating the Hannegan's cardinals.

Most of the crusading army decides to instead attack Hannegan City joined by militant Gleps from the Valley. Blacktooth is seized by Texarks, who cast him into a New Rome dungeon while remaining Nomads sack the city. He escapes the dungeon and falls into a drugged stupor, truly awakening in the damaged St. Peter's Cathedral, where he finds Brownpony and his last surviving bodyguard, Wooshin. Their reunion is disrupted by the arrival of a Nomad warrior, who informs them that the attack on Hannigan City failed and the last loyal portions of the crusading army are departing. He warns them to flee as a Texark relief force approaches New Rome but Brownpony refuses and seats himself on the papal throne, the first Valana pope in decades to do so. When the Pope realizes he has caused the church's great defeat, he has Wooshin behead him. Blacktooth stops Wooshin from joining him in the ritual act of suicide, and flees the approaching horsemen. A sick Blacktooth is plagued by visions of Saint Leibowitz and the Wild Horse Women holding his twin children as he searches for Ædrea.

Blacktooth renounces his cardinalship before meeting briefly with the new, Texark-sponsored Pope, who turns out to be none other than the defected Cardinal Nauwhat. Blacktooth learns that the Hannegan Filpeo Harq, too, is dead, assassinated in an act of self-sacrifice by the vengeful Wooshin. It is mentioned that Blacktooth lived out his days as a hermit, not far from where Ædrea, now called Sister Clare, lives in a nunnery, home in The Valley of the Misborn.

== Publication history ==
After completing Canticle, Miller signed for another book with Lippincott, but the project apparently fell apart when the publisher offered only a small advance of $1,000. In 1978, Miller sent his agent, Don Congdon, a sixty-page excerpt from a "parallel novel" related to the earlier book. More than a decade later, Bantam publisher Lou Aronica learned of the draft, convinced Congdon to send him a copy, and quickly encouraged Miller to resume work on the novel. After Miller sent more than one hundred more pages to Aronica, Bantam contracted for the project a few months later, and Miller completed 250 more pages in 1990. Progress slowed, but by 1995 Miller had completed more than 600 pages. However, Miller was in ill health after the death of his wife and suffering from writer's block. Fearing that the new work would go unfinished, Miller arranged with author Terry Bisson to complete it. Bisson said he tied up the loose ends Miller had left. Miller died by suicide in early 1996, before the novel's 1997 publication.

Saint Leibowitz and the Wild Horse Woman has been called "Walter Miller's other novel". Reviewer Steven H. Silver points out that this "… is not to say that Saint Leibowitz and the Wild Horse Woman does not deserve to be read. It is a fantastic novel, only suffering in comparison to Miller's earlier work."

== Sources ==
- Roberson, W. H., 2011. Walter M. Miller Jr.,: A Reference Guide to His Fiction and His Life.
- Roberson, W. H. and Battenfeld, R. L., 1992. Walter M. Miller Jr.: A Bio-Bibliography.
- Secrest, Rose, 2002. Glorificemus: A Study of the Fiction of Walter M. Miller, Jr.
