= Dan Weiss (drummer) =

American jazz drummer and composer (born 1977)

- Born: March 4, 1977 (age 49)
- Origin: New York, New York, United States
- Instruments: Drum set, tabla
- Labels: Pi Recordings, Sunnyside Records
- Website: https://www.danweiss.net

Dan Weiss (born March 4, 1977) is an American drummer, percussionist, composer, who lives in Brooklyn, New York, United States. He is largely active in jazz music, particularly avant-garde jazz.

== Background ==
Dan Weiss was raised in New Jersey. He moved to New York City to attend Manhattan School of Music, where he studied with John Riley. He majored in jazz percussion with a minor in classical composition. Weiss has also studied tabla with guru Pandit Samir Chatterjee.

Weiss's intense study of jazz, classical Indian, contemporary classical, West African, and metal creates a sound that transcends conventional style or genre. His compositional trademarks are angular yet emotive melodies; long rhythmic cycles native to many non-western music, complex through-composed drum parts, and melodic shapes that draw directly from the raga system found in Indian classical music.

As a leader, Weiss has released several albums under his own name and with his piano trio. He is the leader of Starebaby, a group consisting of Weiss, keyboardists Matt Mitchell and Craig Taborn, guitarist Ben Monder and bassist Trevor Dunn that blends heavy metal and electronic music with improvised elements of jazz.

As a sideman, he has toured with Lee Konitz, Chris Potter, Kenny Werner, Rudresh Mahanthappa, David Binney, and many others

He has been a Rising Star winner in the 60th and 61st Annual Downbeat Critic Polls and has been called one of "Five Jazz Drummers to Watch" by The New York Times.

== Discography ==
=== As a leader ===
- 2004 Tintal Drumset Solo (Chhandayan)
- 2010 Jhaptal Drumset Solo (Chhandayan)
- 2014 Fourteen (Pi Recordings)
- 2016 Sixteen: Drummers Suite (Pi Recordings)
- 2021 Music For Drums And Guitar with Miles Okazaki (Cygnus)
- 2025 Unclassified Affections (Pi Recordings)

==== with Dan Weiss Trio ====
- 2005 Now Yes When (Tone Of A Pitch)
- 2010 Timshel (Sunnyside)
- 2019 Utica Box (Sunnyside)
- 2022 Dedications (Cygnus)

==== with Starebaby ====
- 2018 Starebaby (Pi Recordings)
- 2020 Natural Selection (Pi Recordings

=== As a sideman ===
- 2025 Frank Carlberg Dream Machine
- 2020 Noah Preminger Contemptment
- 2020 Ohad Talmor Long Forms
- 2020 Tineke Postma Freya
- 2018 Michael Dessen Somewhere In The Upstream
- 2018 Misha Tsiganov Playing with the Wind
- 2009 Rez Abbasi Things To Come
- 2009 Miles Okazaki Generations
- 2008 Rudresh Mahanthappa's Indo-Pak Coalition Apti
- 2006 David Binney Cities And Desire
- 2006 Rudresh Mahanthappa Codebook
- 2006 Miles Okazaki Mirror
- 2006 Rez Abbasi Bazaar
- 2005 Rez Abbasi Snake Charmer
- 2005 David Binney Bastion Of Sanity
