= Talking Man =

1986 novel by Terry Bisson

- 1987 Avon Books edition
- Author: Terry Bisson
- Publisher: Arbor House (Hardback, 1986); Avon Books (Paperback, 1987)
- Publication place: United States
- Pages: 192 (hardback)
- ISBN: 978-0-87795-813-0 (Hardback, U.S.); 978-0380751419 (Paperback, U.S.)

Talking Man is a 1986 fantasy novel by American author Terry Bisson. The book tells the story of a Kentucky mechanic called "Talking Man". Talking Man is a wizard who creates his own world.

== Reception ==
Orson Scott Card rated Talking Man as one of the best SF books of 1986, saying "Bisson brings off his story of a Kentucky junkyard wizard with panache."

Dave Langford reviewed Talking Man for White Dwarf #95, and stated that "quest to save the world from having never been involves a demented car-chase from Kentucky to the North Pole: enjoyably offbeat."
