= Grinnell 14 =

American student protest group

The Grinnell 14 were a group of 16 students from Grinnell College, Iowa US, who organized a political protest in November 1961 in support of a ban on atmospheric testing of nuclear weapons. This took place during the Cold War, after the failed Bay of Pigs Invasion and the Berlin Crisis of 1961, and before the Cuban Missile Crisis. Fourteen students drove to Washington, D.C., where they staged a three-day fast, while two others remained at school to provide communication support for news media and other student groups. The protest has been credited as the start of the student peace movement by Tom Hayden of the Students for a Democratic Society.

== People ==
The students were: Bayard Catron, Terry Bisson, Michael Horwatt, Mike Montross, Bennett Bean, Philip Brown, Peter Coyote, James Smith, Celia Chorosh Segar, Jack Chapman, Mary Mitchell, Sarah (Mary Lou) Beaman-Jones, Ruth Gruenewald Skoglund, Larry Smucker, Curt Lamb, and Ken Schiff. At the time, they were all aged 18 to 21.

Additionally, other students outside the core group stayed at school and fasted in solidarity.

== Communications strategy ==
The protesters settled on a clean-cut, business-like dress code, suitable for wearing to a job interview.

They decided to focus their message to support for a single, actionable goal: to get what became the Partial Nuclear Test Ban Treaty adopted. They said that they supported John F. Kennedy in his reluctance to resume atmospheric testing of nuclear weapons. The Soviet Union had recently resumed atmospheric testing of nuclear weapons.

== Protest ==
They departed Grinnell on Monday, November 13, 1961, and drove straight through from the school to Washington, D.C. They arrived on Tuesday evening, having had to stop three times to repair the two older cars. They held a press conference, and their protest became national news after stories appeared in the wire services. They ate and rested on Wednesday, and began their vigils and meetings with potential supporters at 7:30 a.m. on Thursday, November 16.

On the first day, they marched in front of the White House. They carried signs expressing support for peace, such as "Iowa Students Fasting for Peace" and "We're Behind Kennedy's Peace Race". President Kennedy sent White House staffer Marcus Raskin to meet with them on the first day, and national security adviser McGeorge Bundy on the second day. On the second day, they went to the Russian embassy to present a petition.

During their time in Washington, D.C., the four women slept in a private home. The men originally planned to sleep in a city park, but this turned out to be illegal, so they stayed in student housing. At the end of their fast – one minute past midnight on Sunday morning – the group broke their fast at the Michael Horwatt's home in nearby Falls Church, Virginia, and began driving back to school the next day.

== Reaction ==
Before their departure, about two-thirds of fellow students at Grinnell College supported their goals. The student senate passed a resolution against nuclear testing. Supporters collected money so that they could buy two used cars and pay for gas to drive to Washington, D.C. Their total budget was US$700 at the time of departure (about US$7,500 in current dollars), much of which was donated by the Grinnell 14 themselves. An Iowa insurance executive loaned them a company car and two-way radios for the trip.

Grinnell College did not take a stand on the issue, but the students were not penalized academically for missing classes during the term, and the college administration provided practical support with public relations, including contacting The Des Moines Register to arrange interviews for an article.

The national and international press coverage resulted in students from other schools planning their own protests. The two students who stayed behind to provide communications support began not only answering phone calls from news organizations, but also coordinating a schedule of students from many other schools to follow in their footsteps. The first in line was a group from Bluffton College, a Mennonite school in Ohio with a long tradition of religious pacifism, who joined the Grinnell 14 at noon on the third day. After them, groups from Carleton College, Cornell University, Syracuse University, and Yale University arrived. A continuous schedule of three-day student vigils took place for more than a year after the Grinnell 14's departure.

Counter-protesters included George Lincoln Rockwell, the founder of the American Nazi Party and a group of nine young adults calling itself the Metropolitan Washington Young Americans For Freedom. While some people disagreed with the Grinnell 14's goal, the protest was not generally seen as being supportive of the Soviet Union. Other protesters were common, including for unrelated causes. Columbia Spectator, the student newspaper for Columbia University, reported that students from Columbia took their turn in the scheduled vigils in December 1961. About 20 students from Columbia, carrying signs saying things like "Don't Mimic the Russians", picketed alongside students from other schools in support a nuclear test ban. Five Columbia students joined the group of Young Americans for Freedom, who were in favor of the US resuming nuclear bomb testing and against the United Nations' involvement in the Congo Crisis. They also shared the sidewalk with five uniformed stormtroopers of the American Nazi Party, who were picketing in support of clemency for the German Nazi politician Rudolph Hess, two youths from the Young American Nationalists carrying a sign against communism and racial equality, and a group of older adults supporting the release of the spy Morton Sobell.

== Result ==
In the words of Michael Montross, one of the original instigators of the protest, "by 1963 we had accomplished 100 percent of our stated original objective, and open-air testing of nuclear explosions became internationally prohibited."
