= Freehold =

Freehold may refer to:

== In real estate ==
- Freehold (law), the tenure of property in fee simple
- Customary freehold, a form of feudal tenure of land in England
- Parson's freehold, where a Church of England rector or vicar of holds title to benefice property

== Places ==
- Freehold, Greater Manchester, an area of Oldham, in North West England
  - Freehold Metrolink station, a light rail stop in Greater Manchester, England
- Freehold, a Victorian terraced area in the north east of Lancaster, Lancashire, England
- Freehold, New Jersey (disambiguation)
  - Freehold Borough, New Jersey, United States
    - Freehold Raceway, harness racetrack in Freehold Borough
  - Freehold Township, New Jersey, United States
    - Freehold Raceway Mall, shopping mall in Freehold Township
- Freehold, New York, United States
- Freehold Township, Warren County, Pennsylvania, United States

== In fiction ==
- Farnham's Freehold, 1965 science fiction novel by Robert A. Heinlein
- Freehold (novel), 2004 science fiction novel by Michael Z. Williamson

== Other ==
- USS Freehold (SP-347), a United States Navy minesweeper and tug in commission from 1917 to 1919
- Freehold Stakes, an American Thoroughbred horse race
- Freehold, Iowa, fictional town
