= Walter M. Miller Jr. =

American writer

- Miller in 1966
- Born: Walter Michael Miller Jr. January 23, 1923; New Smyrna Beach, Florida, US
- Died: January 9, 1996 (aged 72); Daytona Beach, Florida, US
- Occupations: Novelist; short story writer
- Spouse: Anna Louise Becker (m. 1945; died 1995)
- Writing career
- Language: English
- Period: 1951–1996
- Genre: Science fiction
- Notable work: A Canticle for Leibowitz (1959)
- Notable awards: Hugo Award (1955 · 1961)

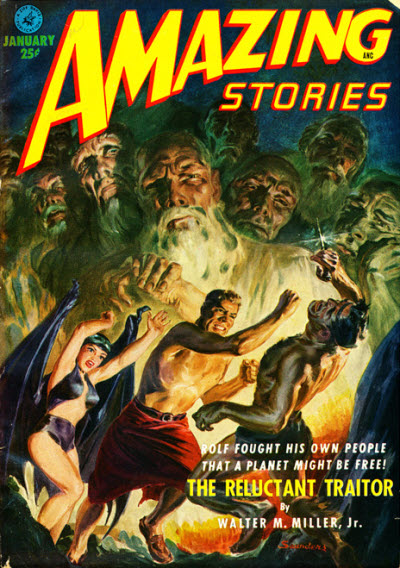
Miller's novella "The Reluctant Traitor" was the cover story for the January 1952 issue of Amazing Stories.

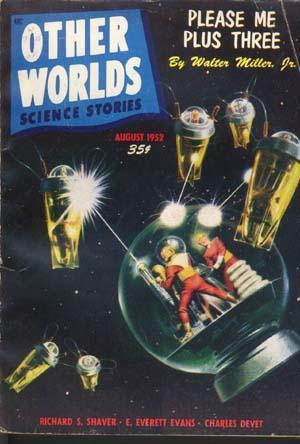
Miller's novella "Please Me Plus Three" was cover-featured on the August 1952 issue of Other Worlds Science Stories.

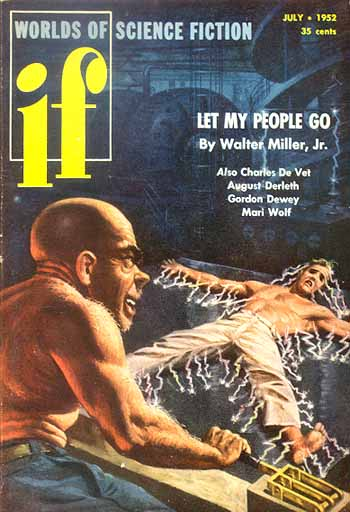
Miller's novella "Let My People Go" was the cover story in the third issue of If in July 1952.

Walter Michael Miller Jr. (January 23, 1923 – January 9, 1996) was an American science fiction writer. He wrote short stories that became a celebrated fix-up novel, A Canticle for Leibowitz (1959). His only novel published in his lifetime, it won the 1961 Hugo Award for Best Novel.

== Early life ==
Miller was born on January 23, 1923, in New Smyrna Beach, Florida. Educated at the University of Tennessee and the University of Texas, he worked as an engineer. During World War II, he served in the Army Air Forces as a radioman and tail gunner, flying more than fifty bombing missions over Italy. He took part in the bombing of the Benedictine Abbey at Monte Cassino, which proved a traumatic experience for him. Joe Haldeman reported that Miller "had post-traumatic stress disorder for 30 years before it had a name", and that Miller displayed a photograph he had taken of Ron Kovic prominently in his living room.

After the war, Miller converted to Catholicism. He married Anna Louise Becker in 1945 and they had four children. He lived with science-fiction writer Judith Merril in 1953.

== Career ==
Between 1951 and 1957, Miller published over three dozen science fiction short stories, winning a Hugo Award in 1955 for the story "The Darfsteller". He also wrote scripts for the television show Captain Video in 1953.

Late in the 1950s, Miller assembled a novel from three closely related novellas he had published in The Magazine of Fantasy & Science Fiction in 1955, 1956 and 1957. The novel, entitled A Canticle for Leibowitz, was published in 1959. It is a post-apocalyptic novel revolving around the canonisation of Saint Leibowitz, and is considered a masterpiece of the genre. It won the 1961 Hugo Award for Best Novel.

After the success of A Canticle for Leibowitz, Miller ceased publishing, although several compilations of Miller's earlier stories were issued in the 1960s and 1970s. A radio adaptation of A Canticle for Leibowitz was produced by WHA Radio and NPR in 1981. A radio adaptation of the first two parts was broadcast in the UK by the BBC in 1992; further details can be found on the BBC Genome Project.

== Later years and death ==
In Miller's later years, he became a recluse, avoiding contact with nearly everyone, including family members; he never allowed his literary agent, Don Congdon, to meet him. According to science fiction writer Terry Bisson, Miller struggled with depression, but had managed to nearly complete a 600-page manuscript for the sequel to Canticle before taking his own life with a firearm on January 9, 1996, shortly after his wife's death.

The sequel, Saint Leibowitz and the Wild Horse Woman, was completed by Bisson at Miller's request and published in 1997.

== Publications ==
=== Saint Leibowitz series ===
The series includes Miller's two novels, published almost 40 years apart.

- A Canticle for Leibowitz (J. B. Lippincott, 1959)
  - Fiat Homo, revised version of "A Canticle for Leibowitz", 1955
  - Fiat Lux, revision of "And the Light Is Risen", 1956
  - Fiat Voluntas Tua, revision of "The Last Canticle", 1957
- Saint Leibowitz and the Wild Horse Woman (1997) – "Terry Bisson finished the nearly complete, and reportedly very polished, manuscript left by Miller."

=== Collections ===
- Conditionally Human (1962), 3 stories
- The View from the Stars (1965), 9 stories
- The Science Fiction Stories of Walter M. Miller Jr. (1977) – omnibus of Conditionally Human and The View from the Stars
- The Best of Walter M. Miller Jr. (1980) – omnibus of Conditionally Human and The View from the Stars plus two added stories, The Lineman and Vengeance for Nikolai
- Conditionally Human and Other Stories (1982) – 6 stories from the 1980 omnibus
- The Darfstellar and Other Stories (1982) – the remaining 8 stories from the 1980 omnibus

=== Short stories ===
- "MacDoughal's Wife" (in American Mercury, March 1950; not science fiction)
- "Month of Mary" (in Extension Magazine, May 1950; not science fiction)
- "Dark Benediction" (1951)
- "Izzard and the Membrane" (1951)
- "The Little Creeps" (1951)
- "Secret of the Death Dome" (1951)
- "The Song of Vorhu" (1951)
- "The Soul-Empty Ones" (1951)
- "The Space Witch" (1951)
- "The Big Hunger" (1952)
- "Big Joe and the Nth Generation" (1952, also known as "It Takes a Thief")
- "Bitter Victory" (1952)
- "Blood Bank" (1952)
- "Cold Awakening" (1952)
- "Command Performance" (1952, also known as "Anybody Else Like Me?")
- "Conditionally Human" (1952)
- "Dumb Waiter" (1952)
- "Gravesong" (1952)
- "Let My People Go" (in If, July 1952)
- "No Moon for Me" (1952)
- "A Family Matter" (1952)
- "The Reluctant Traitor" (Amazing Stories, January 1952)
- "Please Me Plus Three" (in Other Worlds Science Stories, August 1952)
- "Six and Ten Are Johnny" (1952)
- "Crucifixus Etiam" (1953, also known as "The Sower Does Not Reap")
- "I, Dreamer" (1953)
- "The Yokel" (1953)
- "Wolf Pack" (1953)
- "Check and Checkmate" (1953)
- "Death of a Spaceman" (1954, also known as "Memento Homo")
- "I Made You" (1954)
- "The Ties that Bind" (1954)
- "The Will" (1954)
- "Way of a Rebel" (1954)
- "A Canticle for Leibowitz" (The Magazine of Fantasy & Science Fiction, April 1955; reprinted as "The First Canticle"; revised into A Canticle for Leibowitz)
- "The Darfsteller" (1955)
- "The Hoofer" (1955)
- "The Triflin' Man" (1955, also known as "You Triflin' Skunk!")
- "And the Light is Risen" (The Magazine of Fantasy & Science Fiction, August 1956; revised into A Canticle for Leibowitz)
- "The Last Canticle" (The Magazine of Fantasy & Science Fiction, February 1957; revised into A Canticle for Leibowitz)
- "The Lineman" (1957)
- "Vengeance for Nikolai" (1957, also known as "The Song of Marya")

=== Anthology ===
- Beyond Armageddon: Twenty-One Sermons to the Dead, eds. Martin H. Greenberg and Miller (Donald I. Fine, 1985)

== Works about Miller ==
- Roberson, W. H. (2011). Walter M. Miller Jr.: A Reference Guide to His Fiction and His Life.
- Roberson, W. H., and Battenfeld, R. L. (1992). Walter M. Miller Jr.: A Bio-Bibliography.
- Secrest, Rose (2002). Glorificemus: A Study of the Fiction of Walter M. Miller Jr.
- Musch, Sebastian (2016). "The Atomic Priesthood and Nuclear Waste Management - Religion, Sci-fi Literature and the End of our Civilization" Zygon - Journal of Religion and Science, 51 (3), p. 626-639.
