= Macs (short story) =

"macs"
- Short story by Terry Bisson
- Country: United States
- Language: English
- Genre(s): Science fiction

Publication
- Published in: The Magazine of Fantasy & Science Fiction
- Publication type: magazine
- Publication date: October/November 1999

"macs" is a science fiction short story by American writer Terry Bisson, published in 1999.

The story consists entirely of dialogue between several people and an investigator. The people are telling the investigator about clones that were used to satisfy the Victims’ Rights Closure Settlement – wherein people get a clone of the person who was responsible for the death of their loved ones.

"macs" won the 2000 Locus Award for Best Short Story and Nebula Award for Best Short Story, and was a finalist for the 2000 Hugo Award for Best Short Story.
