= A Canticle for Leibowitz =

1959 novel by Walter M. Miller Jr.

- First edition (second impression) dust jacket Illustration by George Sottung
- Author: Walter M. Miller Jr.
- Cover artist: George Sottung
- Language: English
- Genre: Science fiction
- Published: October 1959 (J. B. Lippincott & Co.)
- Publication place: United States
- Media type: Print (hardback and paperback)
- Pages: 320
- Award: Hugo Award for Best Novel (1961)
- OCLC: 1451434
- Followed by: Saint Leibowitz and the Wild Horse Woman

A Canticle for Leibowitz is a post-apocalyptic social science fiction novel by American writer Walter M. Miller Jr., first published in 1959. Set in a Catholic monastery in the desert of the southwestern United States after a devastating nuclear war, the book spans thousands of years as civilization rebuilds itself. The monks of the Albertian Order of Leibowitz preserve the surviving remnants of man's scientific knowledge until the world is again ready for it.

The novel is a fix-up of three short stories Miller published in The Magazine of Fantasy & Science Fiction that were inspired by the author's participation in the bombing of the monastery at the Battle of Monte Cassino during World War II. The book is considered one of the classics of science fiction and has never been out of print. It won the 1961 Hugo Award for best science fiction novel, and its themes of religion, recurrence, and church versus state have generated a significant body of scholarly research. A sequel, Saint Leibowitz and the Wild Horse Woman, was published posthumously in 1997.

== Publication history ==
=== Development ===
By 1955, Walter M. Miller Jr. had published over 30 science fiction short stories in such magazines as Astounding Science Fiction, Amazing Stories, and Fantastic Adventures. Significant themes of his stories included loss of scientific knowledge or "socio-technological regression and its presumed antithesis, continued technological advance", its preservation through oral transmission, the guardianship of archives by priests, and "that side of [human] behavior which can only be termed religious". These thematic elements, combined with the growing subgenre of the "post-disaster" story and Miller's own experiences during World War II, set the stage for the short story that would become the opening section of A Canticle for Leibowitz.

During World War II, Miller served as a radioman and tail gunner in a bomber crew that participated in the destruction of the 6th-century Christian monastery at Monte Cassino, Italy, founded by St. Benedict and recognized as the oldest surviving Christian church in the Western world. This experience impressed him enough to write, a decade later, the short story "A Canticle for Leibowitz", about an order of monks whose abbey springs from the destroyed world around it. The story, which would evolve into "Fiat Homo", the first of three parts of the fix-up novel, was published in the April 1955 edition of The Magazine of Fantasy and Science Fiction (F&SF).

Although not originally intended as a serialization, the saga continued in "And the Light Is Risen", which was published in August 1956 (also in F&SF). That work would later grow into "Fiat Lux", the second part of the novel. It was while writing the third story, "The Last Canticle", for magazine publication in February of the following year that Miller realized he was really completing a novel: "Only after I had written the first two and was working on the third did it dawn on me that this isn't three novelettes, it's a novel. And I converted it".

The publication of the three "Canticle" stories, along with Miller's "The Lineman", in F&SF, marked a significant evolution in the writer's craft. Under the editorship of Anthony Boucher, F&SF possessed a reputation for publishing works with "careful writing and characterization". Walker Percy considered the magazine "high-class sci-fi pulp". The appearance of these stories in the magazine is indicative of the direction Miller's writing had taken toward "'human' stories, less crowded with incident, more concerned with values".

A Canticle for Leibowitz was the only novel Miller published during his lifetime. For the fix-up, Miller did not just collate the three short stories. He changed the title and the names of some characters, added new characters, changed the nature and prominence of existing characters, and added Latin passages. These revisions affected the religious and recurrence themes of the story. The Latin phrases in the novel relate to Roman Catholic Church practices, rituals and official communications. Susan Olsen writes that Miller did not include the Latin phrases just to "add dignity" to the work, but to emphasize its religious themes, making it consonant with the tradition of Judeo-Christian writings.

Changing the name of the abbot of the first part from "Father Juan" to "Abbot Arkos" strengthened the cyclical/recurrence motif, since the name of the first abbot encountered, "Arkos", begins with the first letter of the Latin alphabet and the name of the last abbot, "Zerchi", begins with the last letter. Miller also expanded certain scenes, increasing their importance: for instance, the initial encounter between Brother Francis and Abbot Arkos in "Fiat Homo" grew from two pages in the short story to eight pages in the novel. Abbot Arkos was shown to possess doubts and uncertainty, unlike the dogmatism of Father Juan.

Miller also used the adaptation process to add a layer of complexity to the story. Walker Percy recognized this dimension of the novel, which he compared to a "cipher, a coded message, a book in a strange language". David Seed deemed the novel "charged with half-concealed meaning", an intricacy that seems to have been added as Miller was revising the stories for publication as a novel. Decoding messages such as this is an important activity in Miller's works, both in A Canticle for Leibowitz and in his short stories. For example, in the original version of "Fiat Homo", Miller limits his "wordplay" to an explicit symbolism involving the letter "V" and Brother Francis' "Voice/Vocation" during Francis' encounter with the wandering pilgrim. In the novel, however, "Miller reserves such symbolistic cross-references to the more intellectual analysts and builds a comedy of incomprehension around Francis".

Miller's experience in writing for science fiction magazines contributed to his writing of A Canticle for Leibowitz. His background was with the medium lengths of the short story, novelette, and short novel, where he combined character, action, and import. This full-length novel has a tripartite structure: each section is "short novel size, with counterpoint, motifs, and allusions making up for the lack of more ordinary means of continuity".

=== Publication ===
A Canticle for Leibowitz was published by J. B. Lippincott & Co. as a hardcover in October 1959, and two reprints appeared within the first year. More than 40 new editions and reprints have appeared for the book, which has never been out of print. It often appears on "best of" lists, and has been recognized three times with Locus Poll Awards for best all-time science fiction novel.

== Plot summary ==
=== Background ===
After 20th-century civilization was destroyed by a global nuclear war, known as the "Flame Deluge", there was a violent backlash against the culture of advanced knowledge and technology that had led to the development of nuclear weapons. During this backlash, called the "Simplification", anyone accused of learning, and eventually anyone who could even read, was likely to be killed by rampaging mobs, who proudly took on the name of "Simpletons". Illiteracy became almost universal, and books were destroyed en masse.

Isaac Edward Leibowitz, a Jewish electrical engineer working for the United States military, survived the war and sought refuge from the mobs of the "Simplification" in the sanctuary of a Cistercian monastery, all the while surreptitiously searching for his wife, from whom he had become separated in the war. Eventually concluding that his wife was dead, he joined the monastery, took holy orders (becoming a priest), and dedicated his life to preserving knowledge by hiding books, smuggling them to safety (known as "booklegging"), memorizing, and copying them. He approached the Church for permission to found a new monastic order dedicated to this purpose. With permission granted, he founded his new order in the desert of the American Southwest, where it became known as the "Albertian Order of Leibowitz". The Order's abbey is located in a remote desert in New Mexico, possibly near the military base where Leibowitz worked before the war, on an old road that may have been "a portion of the shortest route from the Great Salt Lake to Old El Paso". Leibowitz was eventually betrayed and martyred. Later beatified by the Roman Catholic Church, he became a candidate for sainthood.

Six hundred years after his death, the abbey still preserves the "Memorabilia", the collected writings and artifacts of 20th-century civilization that survived the Flame Deluge and the Simplification, in the hope that they will help future generations reclaim forgotten science.

The story is structured in three parts: "Fiat Homo", "Fiat Lux", and "Fiat Voluntas Tua". The parts are separated by periods of six centuries each.

=== Fiat Homo ("Let There Be Man") ===
In the 26th century, a 17-year-old novice named Brother Francis Gerard of Utah is on a vigil in a New Mexico desert. While searching for a rock to complete a shelter from the desert wolves, Brother Francis encounters a vagrant Wanderer, apparently looking for the abbey, who inscribes Hebrew on a rock that appears to be the perfect fit for the shelter. When Brother Francis picks up the rock, he discovers the entrance to an ancient fallout shelter (Note: Brother Francis believes that "a Fallout" is some variety of ancient monster, which he imagines as being half-salamander and half-incubus, and he thinks that the shelter was home to fifteen Fallouts, due to the sign on its entrance.) containing "relics", such as handwritten notes on crumbling memo pads bearing cryptic texts resembling a 20th-century shopping list. (Note: Other relics include an electrical engineering blueprint with Leibowitz's name on it, and the skull of wife Emily Leibowitz, who was apparently caught in the outer chamber of the shelter when the bombs fell.) He soon realizes that these notes appear to have been written by Leibowitz, his order's founder. The discovery of the ancient documents causes an uproar at the monastery, as the other monks speculate that the relics once belonged to Leibowitz. Brother Francis's account of the Wanderer, who ultimately never turned up at the abbey, is also greatly embellished by the other monks amid rumours that he was an apparition of Leibowitz himself; Francis strenuously denies the embellishments, but equally persistently refuses to deny that the encounter occurred, despite the lack of other witnesses. Abbot Arkos, the head of the monastery, worries that the discovery of so many potentially holy relics in such a short period may cause delays in Leibowitz's canonization process. Francis is banished back to the desert to complete his vigil and defuse the sensationalism.

Many years later, the abbey is visited by Monsignors Aguerra (God's Advocate) and Flaught (the Devil's Advocate), the Church's investigators in the case for Leibowitz's sainthood. Leibowitz is eventually canonized as Saint Leibowitz – based partly on the evidence Francis discovered in the shelter – and Brother Francis is sent to New Rome to represent the Order at the canonization Mass. He brings with him the documents found in the shelter, and an illumination of one of the documents on which he has spent fifteen years working, as a gift to the Pope.

En route, he is robbed by "The Pope's Children" – an ironic name for outcast genetic mutants who are the descendants of fallout victims – and his illumination is taken, though he negotiates with the robbers to keep the original blueprint on which the illuminated copy was based. The robbers believe the gold-inlaid copy is the original and the blueprint the worthless copy. Francis completes the journey to New Rome and is granted an audience with the Pope. (Note: The Pope was modeled after Pope John XXIII.) Francis presents the Pope with the remaining blueprint, and the Pope comforts Francis with the notion that the fifteen years he spent creating the illumination were not rendered a waste by the theft, but rather were essential in protecting the original relic. The Pope also aids Francis by giving him gold with which to ransom back the illumination; however, Francis is killed during his return trip by the Pope's Children, receiving an arrow between the eyes, just after he spots the approach of the Wanderer in the distance. The Wanderer discovers and buries Francis's body. The narrative then focuses on the buzzards who were denied their meal by the burial; they fly over the Great Plains and find much food near the Red River until a city-state, based in Texarkana, rises.

=== Fiat Lux ("Let There Be Light") ===
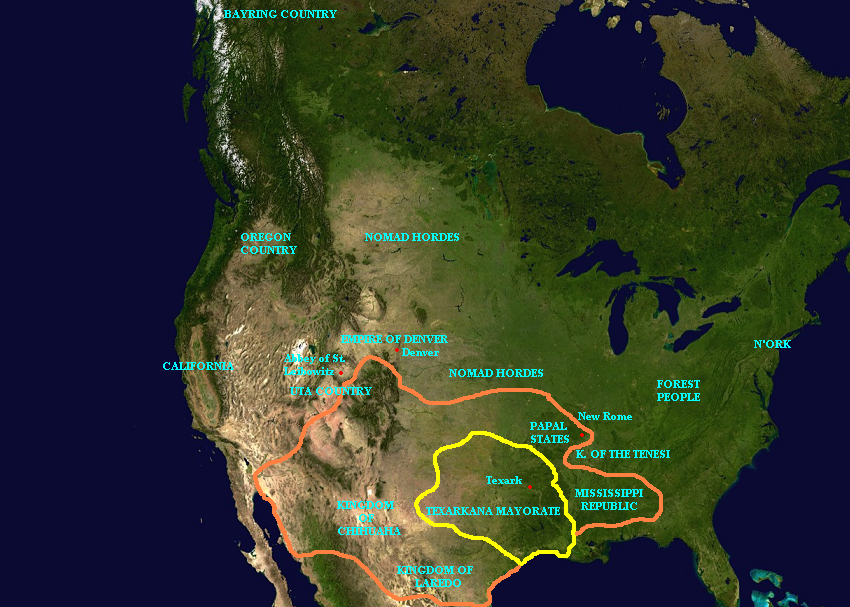
North America in 3174, showing Texark territory in yellow. The Texark expansion as described in this story and in Saint Leibowitz and the Wild Horse Woman is marked in orange.

In 3174, the Albertian Order of Saint Leibowitz is still preserving the half-understood knowledge from before the Flame Deluge and the subsequent Age of Simplification. The new Dark Age is ending, however, and a new Renaissance is beginning. Thon Taddeo Pfardentrott, a highly regarded secular scholar, is sent by his cousin Hannegan, Mayor of Texarkana, to the abbey. Thon Taddeo, frequently compared to Galileo, is interested in the Order's preserved collection of Memorabilia.

At the abbey, Brother Kornhoer, a talented engineer, has just finished work on a "generator of electrical essences", a treadmill-powered electrical generator that powers an arc lamp. He gives credit for the generator to work done by Thon Taddeo. Arriving at the monastery, Thon Taddeo immediately recognizes the significance of Brother Kornhoer's pioneering work. By studying the Memorabilia, Thon Taddeo makes several major "discoveries", and asks the abbot to allow the Memorabilia to be removed to Texarkana. The Abbot Dom Paulo refuses, offering to allow Thon Taddeo to continue his research at the abbey instead. Before departing, the Thon comments that it could take decades to finish analyzing the Memorabilia.

The Wanderer, now called Benjamin, has settled down as a hermit within sight of the abbey, and has struck up a relationship with the abbot. Before Thon Taddeo departs, Benjamin visits the abbey to meet the Thon, to see if he is the long-awaited Messiah.

Meanwhile, Hannegan makes an alliance with the kingdom of Laredo and the neighboring, relatively civilized city-states against the threat of attack from nomadic warriors living on the plains. Hannegan, however, is secretly manipulating the regional politics to effectively neutralize all of his enemies, leaving him in control of the entire region. Monsignor Apollo, the papal nuncio to Hannegan's court, sends word to New Rome that Hannegan intends to attack the Empire of Denver next, and that he intends to use the abbey as a base of operations from which to conduct the campaign. For his actions, Apollo is executed, and Hannegan initiates a church schism, declaring loyalty to the Pope to be punishable by death. The Church excommunicates Hannegan.

=== Fiat Voluntas Tua ("Thy Will Be Done") ===
In the year 3781, mankind has emerged into a new technological age, and now possesses nuclear energy and weapons again, as well as starships and extrasolar colonies. Two world superpowers, the Asian Coalition and the Atlantic Confederacy, have been embroiled in a cold war for 50 years. The Leibowitzian Order's mission of preserving the Memorabilia has expanded to the preservation of all knowledge.

Rumors that both sides are assembling nuclear weapons in space, and that a nuclear weapon has been detonated, increase public and international tensions. At the abbey, the current abbot, Dom Jethras Zerchi, recommends to New Rome that the Church reactivate the Quo peregrinatur grex pastor secum ("Whither wanders the flock, the shepherd is with them"), a contingency plan in the case of another global apocalypse which involves "certain (spacefaring) vehicles" the Church has had since 3756. A "nuclear incident" occurs in the Asian Coalition city of Itu Wan: an underground nuclear explosion has destroyed the city, and the Atlantic Confederacy counters by firing a "warning shot" over the South Pacific. Rumors swirl about whether the city's devastation was deliberate or accidental.

New Rome tells Zerchi to proceed with Quo peregrinatur, and to plan for departure within three days. He appoints Brother Joshua as mission leader, telling him that the mission is an emergency plan for perpetuating the Church on extrasolar colony planets in the event of a nuclear war on Earth. The Order's Memorabilia will also accompany the mission. That night the Atlantic Confederacy launches an assault against Asian Coalition space platforms. The Asian Coalition responds by using a nuclear weapon against the Confederacy capital city of Texarkana, which kills millions of people. A ten-day cease-fire is issued by the World Court. The Wanderer reappears at the rectory, at the last meal before Brother Joshua and the space-trained monks and priests depart on a secret chartered flight for New Rome, hoping to leave Earth on the starship before the cease-fire ends.

During the cease-fire, the abbey offers shelter to refugees fleeing the regions affected by fallout, which results in a battle of wills over the euthanasia of hopelessly irradiated refugees between the abbot and a doctor from a government emergency response camp. The war resumes, and a nuclear explosion occurs near the abbey. Abbot Zerchi tries to flee to safety, bringing with him the abbey's ciborium containing consecrated hosts, but it is too late. He is trapped by the falling walls of the abbey and finds himself lying under tons of rock and bones as the abbey's ancient crypts disgorge their contents. Among them is a skull with an arrow hole in its forehead (presumably that of Brother Francis Gerard from the first section of the book).

As he lies dying under the abbey's rubble, Zerchi is startled to encounter Mrs. Grales/Rachel, a tomato peddler and two-headed mutant. However, Mrs. Grales has been rendered unconscious by the explosion, and appears to be dying herself. As Zerchi tries to conditionally baptize Rachel, she refuses, and instead takes the ciborium and administers the Eucharist to him. It is implied that she is, like the Virgin Mary, exempt from original sin. Zerchi soon dies, having witnessed an apparent miracle.

After the abbot's death, the scene briefly flashes to Joshua and the Quo peregrinatur crew, who are preparing to launch as the nuclear explosions begin. Joshua, the last crew member to board the starship, knocks the dirt from his sandals (a reference to Matthew 10:14, "If anyone will not welcome you or listen to your words, leave that home or town and shake the dust off your feet"), murmuring "Sic transit mundus" ("Thus passes the world", a play on the phrase sic transit gloria mundi, "thus passes the glory of the world").

As a coda, a final vignette depicts the ecological aspects of the war: seabirds and fish succumb to the poisonous fallout, and a shark evades death only by moving to particularly deep water, where, it is noted, the shark was "very hungry that season".

== Major themes ==
=== Recurrence and cyclical history ===
Scholars and critics have noted the theme of cyclic history or recurrence in Miller's works, epitomized in A Canticle for Leibowitz. David Seed, in discussing the treatment of nuclear holocaust in science fiction in his book American Science Fiction and the Cold War: Literature and Film (1992), states, "it was left to Walter M. Miller's A Canticle for Leibowitz to show recurrence taking place in a narrative spanning centuries". David N. Samuelson, whose 1969 doctoral dissertation is considered the "best overall discussion" of the book, calls the "cyclical theme of technological progress and regress ... the foundation-stone on which A Canticle for Leibowitz is built".

The story's circular structure – and the cyclical history it presents – support a number of thematic and structural elements which unify its three sections. Although the novel's events take place in a fictional future, the three parts allegorically represent crucial phases of Western history. The first section, "Fiat Homo", depicts a Church preserving civilization, a counterpart to the "Age of Faith" after the Fall of Rome. The action of the second part, "Fiat Lux", focuses on a renaissance of "secular learning", echoing the "divergences of Church and State and of science and faith". "Fiat Voluntas Tua", the final part, is the analog of contemporary civilization, with its "technological marvels, its obsessions with material, worldly power, and its accelerating neglect of faith and the spirit".

In her analysis of Miller's fiction, Rose Secrest connects this theme directly to one of Miller's earlier short fiction works, quoting a passage from "The Ties that Bind", published in the May 1954 edition of If magazine: "All societies go through three phases.... First there is the struggle to integrate in a hostile environment. Then, after integration, comes an explosive expansion of the culture-conquest.... Then a withering of the mother culture, and the rebellious rise of young cultures".

=== Church versus state ===
The third part, "Fiat Voluntas Tua", includes a debate between future Church and state stances on abortion and euthanasia, a thematic issue representative of the larger conflict between Church and state. Literary critic Edward Ducharme claimed that "Miller's narrative continually returns to the conflicts between the scientist's search for truth and the state's power".

== Literary reception and significance ==
Initial response to the novel was mixed, but it drew responses from newspapers and magazines normally inattentive to science fiction. A Canticle for Leibowitz was reviewed in such notable publications as Time, The New Yorker, The New York Times Book Review, and The Spectator. While The New Yorker was negative – calling Miller a "dull, ashy writer guilty of heavy-weight irony" – The Spectator's was mixed. Also unimpressed, Time said, "Miller proves himself chillingly effective at communicating a kind of post-human lunar landscape of disaster", but dubbed it intellectually lightweight. The New York Times Book Review's Martin Levin, however, hailed the work as an "ingenious fantasy". The Chicago Tribune gave the book unusual exposure outside the genre in a front-page review in the Chicago Tribune Magazine of Books, reviewer Edmund Fuller calling it "an extraordinary novel". Rating it five stars out of five, Floyd C. Gale of Galaxy Science Fiction said that "It has many passages of remarkable power and deserves the widest possible audience". A decade later, Time re-characterized its opinion of the book, calling it "an extraordinary novel even by literary standards, [which] has flourished by word of mouth for a dozen years". After criticizing unrealistic science fiction, Carl Sagan in 1978 listed A Canticle for Leibowitz as among stories "that are so tautly constructed, so rich in the accommodating details of an unfamiliar society that they sweep me along before I have even a chance to be critical".

A Canticle for Leibowitz was an early example of a genre story becoming a mainstream best-seller after large publishers entered the science-fiction market. In 1961 it was awarded the Hugo Award for Best Novel by The World Science Fiction Convention. In the years since, praise for the work has been consistently high. It is considered a "science-fiction classic ... [and] is arguably the best novel written about nuclear apocalypse, surpassing more popularly known books like On the Beach". The book has also generated a significant body of literary criticism, including numerous literature journal articles, books and college courses. Acknowledging its serialization roots, literary critic David N. Samuelson writes that the novel "may be the one universally acknowledged literary masterpiece to emerge from magazine SF". Fellow critic David Cowart places the novel in the realm of works by Evelyn Waugh, Graham Greene, and Walker Percy, in 1975 stating it "stands for many readers as the best novel ever written in the genre". Percy, a National Book Award recipient, declared the book "a mystery: it's as if everything came together by some felicitous chance, then fell apart into normal negative entropy. I'm as mystified as ever and hold 'Canticle' in even higher esteem". Scholars and critics have explored the many themes encompassed in the novel, frequently focusing on its motifs of religion, recurrence, and church versus state.

The novel has also had a notable influence on popular culture, particularly in the realm of video games. A Canticle for Leibowitz is cited by Tim Cain, one of the original creators of the Fallout series, as an inspiration for the game's post-apocalyptic setting and themes. In a 2023 video, Cain discusses how the novel's depiction of a world rebuilding after nuclear devastation helped shape the tone and world-building of Fallout. Within the Fallout universe, the Brotherhood of Steel, a techno-religious faction in the series devoted to preserving and controlling advanced technology, was partly inspired by the monastic order in A Canticle for Leibowitz, which safeguards scientific knowledge in the aftermath of nuclear war.

== Adaptations ==
A 15-part full-cast abridged serial of the novel was adapted for radio by John Reeves and broadcast in 1981 by National Public Radio. The serial was directed by Karl Schmidt and was produced by Schmidt with Marv Nonn. Carol Cowan narrated the production.

In 1992, BBC Radio 4 broadcast a 90-minute dramatization of the first two parts, "Fiat Homo" and "Fiat Lux", with Andrew Price as Brother Francis and Michael McKenzie as Dom Paulo. The adaptation was by Donald Campbell and was directed by Hamish Wilson.

A 2012 radio adaptation of "Fiat Homo, Part One of A Canticle For Leibowitz" read by Nigel Lindsay, abridged by Nick McCarty and produced by Philippa Geering for BBC Radio 4 Extra, was broadcast in five 30-minute parts.

== Sequel ==
Toward the end of his life, Miller wrote another installment of the Abbey of Saint Leibowitz saga, Saint Leibowitz and the Wild Horse Woman. A full-length novel (455 pages) significantly longer than its predecessor, it is set in AD 3254, eighty years after the events of "Fiat Lux" but several centuries before "Fiat Voluntas Tua". Suffering from writer's block and fearful the new work would go unfinished, Miller arranged with author Terry Bisson to complete it. Bisson said all he did was go in and tie up the loose ends Miller had left. The novel tells the story of Brother Blacktooth St. George of the Leibowitzian abbey who, unlike Brother Francis, wants to be released from his holy vows and leave the abbey. In addition to recounting his travels as Cardinal Brownpony's personal secretary, the book describes the political situation in the 33rd century as the Church and the Texark Empire vie for power. Miller died before the novel's publication.

Saint Leibowitz and the Wild Horse Woman has been called "Walter Miller's other novel". Reviewer Steven H. Silver points out that this "is not to say that Saint Leibowitz and the Wild Horse Woman does not deserve to be read. It is a fantastic novel, only suffering in comparison to Miller's earlier work".

== Sources ==
- Roberson, Williams H.; Battenfeld, Robert L. (June 30, 1992). Walter M. Miller, Jr.: A Bio-Bibliography. Bio-Bibliographies in American Literature. Westport, CT: Greenwood Press. ISBN 978-0-313-27651-4.
- Wagner, Thomas M. (2005). "A Canticle for Leibowitz". SF Reviews.net. Archived from the original on June 3, 2007.
