= Freehold (novel) =

2004 military science fiction novel by Michael Z. Williamson

- Cover of first edition
- Author: Michael Z. Williamson
- Cover artist: David Mattingly
- Language: English
- Series: Freehold Series
- Genre: Science fiction
- Publisher: Baen Books
- Publication date: 2004
- Publication place: United States
- Media type: Print (Paperback)
- Pages: 660
- ISBN: 0-7434-7179-2
- OCLC: 54697380
- LC Class: CPB Box no. 2303 vol. 6
- Followed by: The Weapon

Freehold is a military science fiction novel by Michael Z. Williamson, published in 2004 by Baen Books. The book tells the story of Kendra Pacelli, a young soldier who begins the book in the service of a world-dominant, authoritarian United Nations. Accused of a crime she did not commit, she flees Earth for the Freehold of Grainne where she struggles to adapt to the climate and culture of an ultra-libertarian planet. She eventually joins the Freehold military and fights in a war against a UN invasion.

The novel received positive reviews in SF Site and Kliatt but a negative review in Science Fiction Chronicle. The Freehold series is continued in The Weapon, which begins prior to Freehold and ends approximately two years afterwards.

== Background ==
In an autobiographical essay, Williamson relates that he was frustrated with the difficulty of selling his short stories and was discussing the issue on the Baen's Bar forum. He was then contacted by Jim Baen who asked him to send a single chapter of something he was working on. Williamson sent him a chapter of Freehold and after six months of discussion and editing, Baen bought the book.

Williamson has remarked that the main character of Kendra Pacelli is partially based on himself and his experience immigrating from the UK to Canada and the United States.

== Plot ==
In the future, Earth has become an oppressive society with pervasive bureaucratic regulation by a global United Nations. Kendra Pacelli is a logistics non-commissioned officer in the UN Protection Force (UNPF) until she is implicated in a scheme that involved stealing millions of dollars' worth of materiel from the Protection Force. The UN Investigators are notorious for brutal interrogations of prisoners and exoneration is unlikely even though she is innocent. Warned by a friend, she decides to seek asylum with the Freehold of Grainne, which is independent of UN control.

Kendra moves to the colony, though due to the expense of her transit she must enter the colony’s indenturing program. Kendra slowly becomes acclimated to the totally free market society of Freehold. Differences she must deal with include total lack of regulation of anything, pervasive personal firearms ownership, relaxed mores regarding sex and dress, voluntary taxation, almost nonexistent crime, and minimal government infrastructure.

The total lack of regulation on commerce causes the UN to impose sanctions on Freehold due to safety concerns which causes Kendra to be laid off from her initial job and enlist in Freehold's military. She is required to go through basic training before she is assigned a billet as a corporal. Her superior sends her to noncommissioned officer training after a short time, believing that war with Earth is imminent and unavoidable.

After a precipitating incident involving a group of immigrants from Earth, war breaks out and the UN launches an invasion. The UN forces are numerically superior and the Freehold military resorts to guerilla warfare with support of the armed citizenry. Kendra is stranded out in the rural sections of the planet, and becomes a commander of a local guerrilla force made up of a large community of farming families. She starts becoming hostile and participates in brutality and violence beyond the rules of war. At one point, her prior criminal record on Earth is brought up and a reward offered, which requires her to shoot some of her colleagues who want to turn her in.

The UN forces are hampered by the realities of Freehold: 90% of freehold is armed, a large number are military service veterans, the planet has gravity 1.18 times that of Earth's, they do not know the terrain, and there is no government infrastructure for them to assimilate. Eventually the Freeholders organize a massive counter-offensive in which Kendra is charged with holding an infantry line against a numerically superior force with little support. She is seriously wounded in the effort, but holds her line and the UN forces are defeated.

Kendra helps with the systematic urban warfare to clean out the cities and suffers further violence in the process. Freehold uses captured space materiel to launch orbital strikes on Earth and launches several black operations missions on large cities, causing massive death and destruction. In the end, Earth negotiates a truce. Kendra survives the war and is bestowed a medal.

== Reception ==
Freehold, was released in January 2004 and made #3 on the April 2004 Locus Bestsellers list for science-fiction and fantasy paperbacks. Compared with other newcomers on the list, Freehold was behind Thief of Lives but ahead of Engine City, Heirs of Earth and Probability Space.

Freehold was nominated for the 2005 Prometheus Award for best libertarian science fiction novel and much of the critical coverage of the book discussed its political aspects. In a review for Prometheus, the newsletter of the Libertarian Futurist Society, Fran Van Cleave criticized the depictions of torture and violence and called the book a "neo-con fantasy". Don D'Ammassa described Freehold as an "oversimplified, black-and-white" political tract with an unrealistic view of humanity, and a "very long but frankly not very entertaining diatribe". Michael M. Jones of SF Site conversely called Williamson's portrayal of a libertarian society "sound and believable" and described the book as "a satisfactory debut". He drew comparisons to Robert A. Heinlein's Stranger in a Strange Land and Friday as well as to the works of John Ringo. Ginger Armstrong of Kliatt called Freehold a "highly readable SF adventure" with "a strong female protagonist". He praised the pacing, the attention to technical detail, and the depiction of alien cultures.
