= A Long Time Until Now =

2015 novel by Michael Z. Williamson

- Language: English
- Genre: Sci-fi
- Set in: Paleolithic era

A Long Time Until Now is a military science-fiction novel by Michael Z. Williamson, published in 2015 by Baen Books. It tells the story of US soldiers in Afghanistan who are transported in time to the Paleolithic era. The novel was praised for its characters and survival elements.

== Publication history ==
A Long Time Until Now takes place in a setting different from Williamson's previous novels. In an essay on the Baen Books website, Williamson describes the research he undertook to enhance the realism of the story. This included reading papers on paleolithic Central Asia, experimenting with making fire with friction, and cooking bugs.

A Long Time Until Now was released in hardcover and as an e-book in May 2015. A paperback release followed in July 2016. The cover by Kurt Miller shows soldiers from different time periods defending against prehistoric animals. Miller is a frequent illustrator of military science fiction covers, known for his detailed and vivid depictions of warriors.

== Plot ==
The book tells the story of ten US soldiers on patrol in Afghanistan. They are transported back into the Paleolithic past where they meet people native to that time period as well as other groups displaced in time, including imperial Roman soldiers. The plot incorporates survival story elements as the soldiers must use their wits and equipment to survive in a hostile, foreign environment.

== Reception ==
The novel was favorably received. In a review for Analog Science Fiction and Fact, Don Sakers described it as a "fascinating story" and especially praised the survival elements. A review in Stars & Stripes emphasized Williamson's drawing on his own military experience. Mark Lardas of the Galveston Daily News praised the "different and fully developed" characters and described the book as "outstanding entertainment". Bill Lawthorn of SFRevu criticized the depiction of female characters but called the book a "good novel".

== Sequel ==
That was Now, This is Then, a novel by Michael Z. Williamson, was released in 2021, a direct sequel to A Long Time Until Now.
