= Terry Bisson =

American novelist (1942–2024)

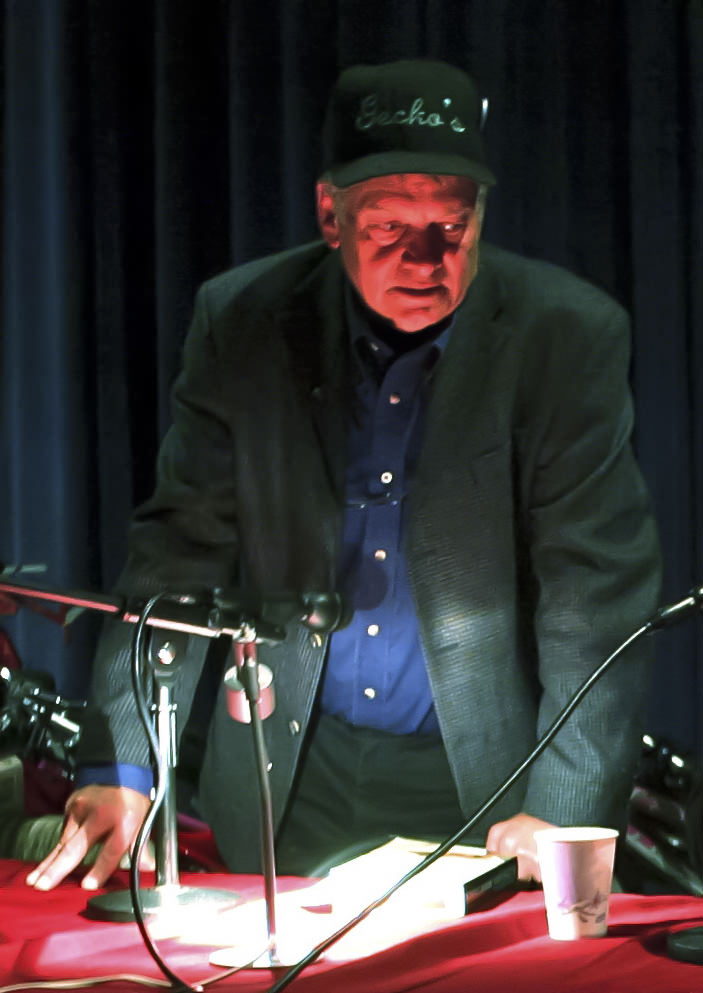
- Bisson in 2009
- Born: Terry Ballantine Bisson; February 12, 1942; Madisonville, Kentucky, U.S.
- Died: January 10, 2024 (aged 81); Berkeley, California
- Education: Grinnell College; University of Louisville
- Spouse: Deirdre Holst
- Children: 3
- Writing career
- Language: English

Terry Ballantine Bisson (February 12, 1942 – January 10, 2024) was an American science fiction and fantasy author. He was best known for his short stories, including "Bears Discover Fire", which won the Hugo Award and the Nebula Award, and "They're Made Out of Meat".

== Biography ==
Terry Ballantine Bisson was born on February 12, 1942, in Madisonville, Kentucky, and raised in Owensboro, Kentucky.

While a student at Grinnell College (Iowa) in 1961, Bisson was one of a group of students who traveled to Washington, D.C., during the Cuban Missile Crisis supporting U.S. President John F. Kennedy's "peace race". Kennedy invited the group to the White House (the first time protesters had ever been so recognized) and they met for several hours with McGeorge Bundy. The group received wide press coverage, and this event is regarded as the start of the student peace movement. Over time, they came to be known as the Grinnell 14.

After leaving Grinnell College, Bisson graduated from the University of Louisville in 1964. He lived "on and off" in New York City for most of the next four decades, before moving to Oakland, California, in 2002. He became a "working" writer in 1981. A self-identified member of the New Left, he operated Jacobin Books, a "revolutionary" mail-order book service, from 1985 to 1990, in partnership with Judy Jensen. Bisson was also a member of the May 19th Communist Organization.

Bisson was married three times. He and his first wife, Deirdre Holst, had three children. His second marriage was to Mary Corey. Bisson married his "longtime companion" Judy Jensen on December 24, 2004; the couple had one daughter, and Bisson was stepfather to Jensen's two children.

In the 1960s, early in his career, Bisson collaborated on several comic book stories with Clark Dimond, and he edited Major Publications' black-and-white horror-comics magazine Web of Horror, but left before the fourth issue.

Bisson's first novel was Wyrldmaker, a science fiction novel influenced by James Blish's The Seedling Stars. His next novel was Talking Man (1986), a fantasy about the titular wizard living in the contemporary American South.

In 1996, he wrote two three-part comic book adaptations of Nine Princes in Amber and The Guns of Avalon, the first two books in Roger Zelazny's Amber series.

In 1997, after Walter M. Miller, Jr.'s death in 1996, Bisson completed Miller's unfinished Saint Leibowitz and the Wild Horse Woman, the sequel to Miller's classic 1960 novel A Canticle for Leibowitz.

Bisson died in the early morning on January 10, 2024, at the age of 81, of colon cancer.

== Bibliography ==
=== Novels ===
- Wyrldmaker (1981)
- Talking Man (1986)
- Fire on the Mountain (1988)
- Voyage to the Red Planet (1990)
- Pirates of the Universe (1996)
- The Pickup Artist (2001)
- Any Day Now (2012)

Billy

- Billy and the Ants (2005)
- Billy and the Bulldozer (2005)
- Billy and the Talking Plant (2006)
- Billy and the Fairy (2006)
- Billy and the Unicorn (2006)
- Billy and the Spacemen (2006)
- Billy and the Circus Girl (2006)
- Billy and the Magic Midget (2006)
- Billy and the Wizard (2007)
- Billy and the Flying Saucer (2008)
- Billy's Book (2009; also appeared as Billy's Picture Book (2010)); as by Terry Bisson and Rudy Rucker
- Billy and the Pond Vikings (2009)
- Billy and the Time Skateboard (2009)
- Billy and the WITHC (2009)
- Billy in Dinosaur City (2009)

Gemini Jack (with Stephanie Spinner)

- Be First in the Universe (2000)
- Expiration Date: Never (2001)

Star Wars Universe

- Star Wars: Clone Wars
  - Star Wars: Boba Fett
    - Boba Fett: The Fight to Survive (2002)
    - Boba Fett: Crossfire (2002)

The Real Adventures of Jonny Quest (as Brad Quentin)

- Jonny Quest: The Demon of the Deep (1996)
- Jonny Quest: Peril in the Peaks (1997)
- Jonny Quest: Attack of the Evil Cyber-God (1997)

Novelizations

- Virtuosity (1995)
- Johnny Mnemonic (1995)
- The Fifth Element (1997)
- Alien Resurrection – The Official Junior Novelization (1997)
- Galaxy Quest (1999)
- The 6th Day (2000)

=== Collections ===
- Bears Discover Fire and Other Stories (1993)
- In the Upper Room and Other Likely Stories (2000)
- Meucs (French language; 2003)
- Greetings (2005)
- Numbers Don't Lie (2005)
- The Left Left Behind (2009)
- TVA Baby and Other Stories (2011)

=== Chapter books ===
- Dear Abbey (2003)
- Planet of Mystery (2008)
- Catch 'Em in the Act (2010)
- TVA Baby (2011)
- The Cockroach Hat (2011)

=== Non-fiction ===
- "Car Talk (Tom and Ray Magliozzi with Terry Bisson)" (1991)
- Nat Turner (1988)
- On a Move: The Story of Mumia Abu Jamal (2001)

=== Short fiction ===
==== Short fiction series ====
Wilson Wu and Irving
collected in Numbers Don't Lie (2001)

- "The Hole in the Hole" (1994)
- "The Edge of the Universe" (1996)
- "Get Me to the Church on Time" (1998)

Dialogue

- "They're Made Out of Meat" (1991)
- "Press Ann" (1991)
- "Next" (1992)

This Month in History

- "This Month in History" Locus #519 (2004) - #558 (2007)
- "This Month in History" Locus #610 (2011) - #642 (2014)

==== Short stories ====
- "Over Flat Mountain" (1990)
- "Bears Discover Fire" (1990)
- "The Two Janets" (1990)
- "The Coon Suit" (1991)
- "Carl's Lawn & Garden" (1992)
- "Two Guys from the Future" (1992)
- "Are There Any Questions?" (1992)
- "Canción Autentica de Old Earth" (1992)
- "Necronauts" (1993)
- England Underway (1993)
- "By Permit Only" (1993)
- "The Toxic Donut" (1993)
- "The Shadow Knows" (1993)
- "The Message" (1993)
- "George" (1993)
- "Partial People" (1993)
- "Tell Them They Are All Full of Shit and They Should Fuck Off" (1994)
- "Dead Man's Curve" (1994)
- "The Joe Show" (1994)
- "10:07:24" (1995)
- "There Are No Dead" (1995)
- ""Hawk" Debate Heats Up" (1996)
- "In the Upper Room" (1996)
- "An Office Romance" (1997)
- "The Reef Builders" (1997) with Karen Joy Fowler, Maureen F. McHugh and Rosaleen Love
- "The Player" (1997)
- "Incident at Oak Ridge" (1998)
- "First Fire" (1998)
- "Not This Virginia" (1999)
- "Smoother" (1999)
- "macs" (1999); also appeared as: "Macs" (1999)
- "Pleasantville Monster Project: A Film" (1999)
- "Lucy" (2000)
- "He Loved Lucy" (2000)
- "The Old Rugged Cross" (2001)
- "A View From the Bridge" (2001)
- "Charlie's Angels" (2001)
- "The Hugo Nominee (2002)
- "OpenClose" (2002)
- "I Saw the Light" (2002)
- "Come Dance with Me" (2003)
- "Dear Abbey" (2003)
- "Greetings" (2003)
- "Almost Home" (2003)
- "Death's Door" (2004)
- "Robert's Rules of Order" (play, 2004)
- "Scout's Honor" (2004)
- "Super 8" (2004)
- "Special Relativity" (2006)
- "2+2=5" (2006) with Rudy Rucker
- "Brother, Can You Spare a Dime?" (2006); also appeared as "Brother Can You Spare a Dime?" (2011)
- "Put Up Your Hands" (2006)
- "Pirates of the Somali Coast" (2007)
- "BYOB FAQ" (2007)
- "Captain Ordinary" (2008)
- "The Stamp" (2008)
- "Let Their People Go: The Left Left Behind" (2008); also appeared as "The Left Left Behind: "Let Their People Go!"" (2008)
- "Private Eye" (2008)
- "Catch 'Em in the Act" (2008)
- "Planet of Mystery" (2008)
- "TVA Baby" (2009)
- "Corona Centurion™ FAQ" (2009); also appeared as "Corona FAQ" (2011)
- "Farewell Atlantis" (2009)
- "The Cockroach Hat" (2010)
- "About It" (2010)
- "Teen Love Science Club" (2010)
- "A Special Day" (2011)
- "Where the Lost Things Are" (2014) with Rudy Rucker

=== Critical studies and reviews of Bisson's work ===
In the upper room and other likely stories

- Sallis, James (Dec 2000). "Books". F&SF. 99 (6): 32–37. Archived from the original on December 27, 2004.
