= Bears Discover Fire =

- Short story by Terry Bisson
- Country: United States
- Language: English
- Genre: Science fiction

Publication
- Published in: Isaac Asimov’s Science Fiction Magazine
- Publication type: Magazine
- Media type: Print (Paperback)
- Publication date: August 1990

"Bears Discover Fire" is a science fiction short story by American science fiction author Terry Bisson. It concerns aging and evolution in the US South, the dream of wilderness, and community. The premise is that bears have discovered fire, and are having campfires on highway medians. It is set in western Kentucky, near Bowling Green and along Interstate 65.

It was originally published in Isaac Asimov’s Science Fiction Magazine in August 1990.

== Reception ==
"Bears Discover Fire" won the Hugo Award for Best Short Story, the Nebula Award for Best Short Story, and the Locus Award for Best Short Story. It was the inspiration for Michael Bishop's 2005 story "Bears Discover Smut".

== In popular culture ==
"Bears Discover Fire" has been adapted into a Columbia University MFA directed by Ben Leonberg and produced by Scott Riehs.

== Awards ==
- 1991 Hugo Award for Best Short Story
- 1990 Nebula Award for Best Short Story
- 1991 Asimov's Reader's Award
- 1991 The Theodore Sturgeon Memorial Award
- 1991 Locus Award for Best Short Story
- 1991 SF Chronicle Award
