= Seeing Ear Theater =

Drama Troupe

Seeing Ear Theater was an internet based drama/re-enactment troupe attempting to capture the feel of older scifi radio plays. The content was originally maintained on the SciFi.com website and ran from 1997 to 2001. Episodes can be retrieved from the Internet Archive, but the episode numbers and dates are incorrect.

Title	Air Date (yyyy mm dd)	Author (adapted by)
"Alice in Wonderland"	1998? mm? dd?	Lewis Carroll (adapted by Charles Potter)
"The Bigger One"	1998? mm? dd?	Gregory Benford
"Black Canoes"	2000 09 01	Tony Daniel
"Breakaway, Backdown"	1997? mm? dd?	James Patrick Kelly
"Child's Play"	Unknown	William Tenn (adapted by Andrew Joffe)
"The City of Dreams – Episode 1: The Damned Are Playing at Godzilla's Tonight"	2000 07 10	J. Michael Straczynski
"The City of Dreams – Episode 2: Rolling Thunder"	2000 mm? dd?	J. Michael Straczynski
"The City of Dreams – Episode 3: The Friends of Jackie Clay"	2000 mm? dd?	J. Michael Straczynski
"The City of Dreams – Episode 4: The Tolling of the Hour"	2000 mm? dd?	J. Michael Straczynski
"The City of Dreams – Episode 5: Night Calls"	2001 mm? dd?	J. Michael Straczynski
"The City of Dreams – Episode 6: MCSD 00121J"	2001 mm? dd?	J. Michael Straczynski
"The City of Dreams – Episode 7: Samuel Beckett, Your Ride Is Here"	2001 mm? dd?	J. Michael Straczynski
"The City of Dreams – Episode 8: The Alpha and Omega of David Wells"	2001 mm? dd?	J. Michael Straczynski
"A Clean Escape"	1997 mm? dd?	John Kessel (adapted by ?)
"The Country Doctor"	1997 03 dd?(before March 14)	Franz Kafka (adapted by ?)
"Daughter Earth" (Part 1)	1999 02 08	James Morrow (adapted by?)
"Daughter Earth" (Part 2)	1999 02 22	James Morrow (adapted by?)
"Death of Captain Future"	1998 03 05	Allen Steele (adapted by Brian Smith)
"Diary of a Mad Deity"	2000 mm? dd?	James Morrow
"A Dry Quiet War"	2000? mm? dd?	Tony Daniel
"An Elevator and a Pole"	Unknown	Tony Daniel
"Emily 501" (Part 1)	1999 12 31	Tamara Hladik
"Emily 501" (Part 2)	Unknown	Tamara Hladik
"Facade"	Unknown	Amanda Hopkins
"Feel the Zaz" (Part 1)	1999 10 04	James Patrick Kelly
"Feel the Zaz" (Part 2)	1999 10 18	James Patrick Kelly
"Fire Watch"	2000? mm? dd?	Connie Willis (adapted by Tony Daniel)
"The First (and Last) Musical on Mars" (Part 1)	1998 08 17	George Zarr
"The First (and Last) Musical on Mars" (Part 2)	1998 08 24	George Zarr
"The Flat Edge of the Earth" (Part 1)	1998 10 03	Brian Smith and Terry Bisson
"The Flat Edge of the Earth" (Part 2)	1998 10 12	Brian Smith and Terry Bisson
"George and the Red Giant" (Part 1)	1998 07 20	Stephen Baxter (adapted by Eric Brown)
"George and the Red Giant" (Part 2)	1998 08 03	Stephen Baxter (adapted by Eric Brown
"A Good Knight's Work"	Unknown	Robert Bloch (adapted by George Zarr)
"Greedy Choke Puppy"	1998 03 10	Nalo Hopkinson (adapted by ?)
"Herd Mentality"	1998 03 31	Kurt Roth
"History of the Devil" (Part 1)	1999 03 08	Clive Barker
"History of the Devil" (Part 2)	1999 03 22	Clive Barker
"History of the Devil" (Part 3)	1999 04 05	Clive Barker
"History of the Devil" (Part 4)	1999 04 19	Clive Barker
"History of the Devil" (Part 5)	1999 05 03	Clive Barker
"In the Shade of the Slowboat Man"	Unknown	Dean Wesley Smith (adapted by Kristine Kathryn Rusch)
"Into the Sun"	1997 03 10	Brian Smith
"The Jaguar Hunter"	Unknown	Lucius Shepard
"Jumping Niagara Falls"	1999 10 30	Brian Smith and George Zarr
"Kindred" (Part 1)	2001 02 15	Octavia Butler (adapted by Tony Daniel)
"Kindred" (Part 2)	2001 02 20	Octavia Butler (adapted by Tony Daniel)
"Kindred" (Part 3)	2001 02 22	Octavia Butler (adapted by Tony Daniel)
"Kindred" (Part 4)	2001 02 27	Octavia Butler (adapted by Tony Daniel)
"Knock"	2000? mm? dd?	Fredric Brown (adapted by ?)
"Lay Your Hands on Me"	Unknown	Unknown
"The Lucky Strike"	2000 07 21	Kim Stanley Robinson (adapted by Fiona Avery)
"The Man Who Could Work Miracles"	Unknown	H. G. Wells (adapted by Andrew Joffe)
"Marilyn or the Monster" (Part 1)	1999 12 03	Jack Dann (adapted by Jack Dann and Brian Smith)
"Marilyn or the Monster" (Part 2)	1999 12 17	Jack Dann (adapted by Jack Dann and Brian Smith)
"The Martian Crown Jewels"	1998 mm? dd?	Poul Anderson (adapted by Andrew Joffe)
"Meet the Neighbor"	1999 06 28	George Zarr
"Monkey's Paw"	1998? mm? dd?	W. W. Jacobs (adapted by ?)
"The Moon Moth" (Part 1)	2000 08 04	Jack Vance (adapted by George Zarr)
"The Moon Moth" (Part 2)	2000 08 11	Jack Vance (adapted by George Zarr)
"Murder Mysteries" (Part 1)	1999 08 ?	Neil Gaiman (adapted by ?)
"Murder Mysteries" (Part 2)	1999 09 10	Neil Gaiman
"The Nostalgianauts"	2000? mm? dd?	S.N. Dyer (adapted by George Zarr)
"The Oblivion Syndrome"	1998? mm? dd?	Benjamin Wach
"Orson the Alien"	1998 10 30	Terry Bisson
"Other Worlds"	1999 01 25	Charles Potter
"Propagation of Light in a Vacuum" (Part 1)	1999 07 12	James Patrick Kelly
"Propagation of Light in a Vacuum" (Part 2)	1999 07 26	James Patrick Kelly
"The Signal-Man"	1998? mm? dd?	Charles Dickens (adapted by George Zarr)
"Sleepy Hollow: The Legend"	1997? mm? dd?	Washington Irving (adapted by George Zarr)
"Snow, Glass, Apples"	2001 05 31	Neil Gaiman
"Sorry, Wrong Number"	1999 11 01	Lucille Fletcher
"The Tell-Tale Heart"	1997 04 dd?	Edgar Allan Poe (adapted by Brian Smith)
"Think Like a Dinosaur"	1998 02 05	James Patrick Kelly (adapted by ?)
"The Time Machine"	Unknown	H. G. Wells (adapted by Charles Potter)
"Times Arrow, Time's Spiral"	1998 12 28	George Zarr
"Titanic Dreams"	2000? mm? dd?	Robert Olen Butler (adapted by Sarah Montague)
"Too Late – An Experiment in Sound"	1998? mm? dd?	Brian Smith, George Zarr, and Rick Bradley
"Tripping Astral"	1997? mm? dd?	Unknown
"Wanted in Surgery"	1997 10 31	Harlan Ellison
"The Wheel" (Part 1)	1999 05 17	Jeff Kraus and Sue Zizza
"The Wheel" (Part 2)	1999 05 31	Jeff Kraus and Sue Zizza
