= Fran Van Cleave =

American author

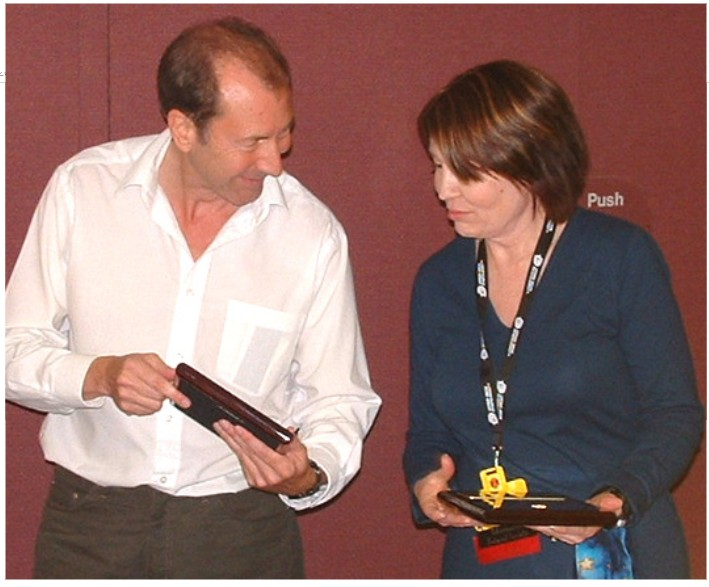
- Fran Van Cleave and David Lloyd at the Prometheus Award ceremony at Worldcon in 2006
- Born: Boston, Massachusetts, U.S.
- Occupation: Author
- Writing career
- Genre: Libertarian science fiction

Fran Van Cleave is an American author of libertarian science fiction, born in Boston and educated as a pharmacist. She was an active member of the Libertarian Futurist Society for many years and served as director of the society in 2005. Van Cleave's works include adventure stories with young protagonists, influenced by the Heinlein juveniles. In addition to fiction, Van Cleave has published articles on scientific topics in Analog Science Fiction and Fact.

== Works of fiction ==
- "Second Chance" (short story in Analog, 1997): A pregnant woman in the future year 2003 wrestles with the ethics of abortion and adoption. In the end she accepts a contract which gives her child up for adoption in exchange for payment. This enables her to follow her ambition of becoming a science fiction writer.
- "Ataxia in Ataraxia" (novella in Analog, 1998): A coming-of-age story on a young clone that must cope with the death of his powerful predecessor.
- "Brain Drain" (short story in Artemis, 2000): In a future United States, scientists are regarded with suspicion and defecting to Canada. The hero is a young boy with mechanical skills who learns to question the regime. Rich Horton of SF Site singled the story out as his favorite from the issue, calling it "a good fun read" despite some issues with plausibility and characterization. Steven Sawicki of the Science Fiction Chronicle was less positive, calling the story "a real struggle to get through" and criticizing it for lack of clarity and excessive use of slang.
- "The Mycojuana Incident" (novella in Analog, February 2001): A doctor investigates a fungal infestation which turns out to be caused by the spraying of anti-marijuana parasitic mold. Governmental agents show up to cover up the case. Steven Sawicki described it as "very typical sf of the bad government, libertarian freedom fighter type" but also called it an entertaining story with "sharp and clever" writing.
- "Navajo Moon-Bird" (novella in Analog, December 2001): A Navajo girl thwarts sabotage of a spaceship bound for a colony on the moon. Rich Horton criticized the characterization of the villains as one-dimensional but called the story "exciting and rousing". The story received an honorable mention in The Year's Best Science Fiction: Nineteenth Annual Collection by Gardner Dozois.
- "B All U Cn B" (short story published online by the Heinlein Centennial, 2007): The Heinlein Centennial organized a short story contest for stories in the spirit of Robert A. Heinlein and published the six winning stories in an online anthology.
- "Inherit the Moon" (short story in Return to Luna anthology, 2008): The National Space Society organized a short story contest on human lunar settlement and the winning stories were published in an anthology.
