= Miles Okazaki =

American jazz guitarist and composer (born 1974)

- Born: December 18, 1974 (age 51); Port Townsend, Washington, U.S.
- Genre: Jazz
- Occupation: Musician
- Instrument: Guitar
- Years active: 1990s–present
- Website: milesokazaki.com

Miles Okazaki (born 1974) is an American jazz guitarist and composer. Okazaki is a lecturer of jazz guitar at the University of Michigan in Ann Arbor.

== Early life ==
Okazaki grew up in Port Townsend, Washington. When he was six, he began lessons on classical guitar. From a young age he was exposed to music and art, primarily because his mother was a painter and his father was a photography professor at Washington State University.

== Discography ==
=== As leader ===
- Mirror (self-released, 2006)
- I Like Too Much with Partipilo, Dan Weiss (Auand, 2008) – live recorded in 2007
- Generations (Sunnyside, 2009)
- Figurations (Sunnyside, 2012)
- Trickster (Pi, 2017)
- Work Volumes 1–6 (The Complete Compositions of Thelonious Monk) (self-released, 2018)
- The Sky Below (Pi Recordings, 2019)
- Trickster's Dream (self-released, 2020)
- Thisness (Pi, 2022)
- Boomtown (Pi, 2026)

=== As sideman or guest ===
With Steve Coleman

- Functional Arrhythmias (Pi, 2013)
- Synovial Joints (Pi, 2015)
- Live at the Village Vanguard Vol. I (Pi, 2018)

With Jane Monheit

- Taking a Chance on Love (Sony Classical, 2004)
- The Season (Epic, 2005)
- Surrender (Concord, 2007)

With others

- Jesse Malin, The Heat (One Little Indian, 2004)
- Matt Mitchell, Phalanx Ambassadors (Pi, 2019)
- Adam Rudolph, Turning Towards the Light (Cuneiform, 2015)
- Tessa Souter, Listen Love (Nara Music, 2004)
- John Zorn-Mary Halvorson Quartet, Paimon: Book of Angels Volume 32 (Tzadik, 2017)
- Patricia Brennan, Of the Near and Far (Pyroclastic Records, 2025)
