= Tony Daniel (science fiction writer) =

American novelist

- Born: Tuscaloosa, Alabama, U.S.
- Occupations: Writer; editor; professor
- Writing career
- Pen name: Tony Daniel
- Genre: Science fiction
- Notable work: Metaplanetary
- Website: tonydaniel.com

Tony Daniel is an American science fiction writer and was an editor at Baen Books and a senior editor at Regnery Publishing.

== Career ==
Tony Daniel was born in Tuscaloosa, Alabama.

Daniel began writing science fiction in 1990. He has authored ten books, numerous short stories and poems, as well as literary criticism, opinion, journalism, and reviews. His work has appeared several times in Gardner Dozois' The Year's Best Science Fiction anthologies. Daniel was a senior editor at Baen Books and Regnery Publishing. He was also senior story editor at SciFi.com's Seeing Ear Theater from 2000 to 2002, where he wrote, produced and directed several productions. He was a lecturer in science fiction as literature, screenplays, and graduate writing workshops at the University of Texas at Dallas from 2006 to 2011.

His novels Metaplanetary (2001) and Superluminal (2004) depict a war between the inner and outer regions of the Solar System. The Publishers Weekly review said of Metaplanetary that Daniel "projects a complex, mind-stretching future". Kirkus Reviews held a similar view, writing "vast, intricate, fizzing with wit, and bulging with utterly fascinating ideas".

Daniel is the author of two Star Trek: The Original Series novels, Star Trek: Devil's Bargain and Star Trek: Savage Trade.

Daniel is perhaps best known for his short story "A Dry, Quiet War," which has been multiply reprinted. His short story "Life on the Moon" was a finalist for the Hugo Award for Best Short Story in 1996 and won the Asimov's Magazine Reader's Choice Award for that year.

== Bibliography ==
=== Novels ===
- Warpath (Tor, 1993), ISBN 0-8125-1966-3
- Earthling (Tor, 1997), ISBN 0-312-86661-5
- Metaplanetary (Eos, 2001), ISBN 0-06-102025-7
- Superluminal (Eos, 2004), ISBN 0-06-102026-5
- Guardian of Night (Baen, 2012), ISBN 978-1-4516-3802-8
- The Heretic (with David Drake; Baen, 2013), ISBN 978-1-4516-3881-3
- Star Trek the Original Series: Devil's Bargain (Pocket Books, 2013), ISBN 978-1-4767-0047-2
- The Savior (with David Drake; Baen, 2014), ISBN 978-1-4767-3670-9
- Star Trek the Original Series: Savage Trade (Pocket Books, 2015), ISBN 978-1-4767-6550-1
- Wulf's Saga
1. The Dragon Hammer (Baen Books, 2016), ISBN 978-1-4767-8155-6
2. The Amber Arrow (Baen Books, 2017), ISBN 978-1-4814-8253-0

==== Short story collections ====
- The Robot's Twilight Companion (Golden Gryphon Press, 1999), ISBN 0-9655901-5-1

=== Novellas ===
- "Candle", Asimov's Science Fiction (Dell Magazines, June 1991)
- "Death of Reason", Asimov's Science Fiction (Dell Magazines, Sept. 1992)
- "A Dry, Quiet War" (1996)
- "The Robot's Twilight Companion", Asimov's Science Fiction (Dell Magazines, Aug. 1996) ISSN 1055-2146
- "Grist", Asimov's Science Fiction (Dell Magazines, Dec. 1998) ISSN 1055-2146
- "Lovers" (2017)

=== Short fiction ===
- "The Passage of Night Trains" (1990)
- "Words" (1991)
- "Candle" (1991)
- "Prism Tree" (1991)
- "Locust" (1991)
- "Brothers" (1991)
- "The Natural Hack" (1992)
- "Lost in Transmission" (1992)
- "Faces" (1992)
- "Despair, Not Feast on Thee" (1992)
- "The Careful Man Goes West" (1992)
- "Death of Reason" (1992)
- "Sun So Hot I Froze to Death" (1993)
- "Always Falling Apart" (1993)
- "Aconcagua" (1993)
- "Dover Beach" (1993)
- "God's Foot" (1993)
- "Angel of Mercy" (1994)
- "Press Return" (1995)
- "Life on the Moon" (1995)
- "No Love in All of Dwingeloo" (1995)
- "The Joys of the Sidereal Long Distance Runner" (1996)
- "The Robot's Twilight Companion" (1996)
- "The Ashes of New Orleans" (1997)
- "Black Canoes" (1997)
- "Radio Praha" (1998)
- "Mystery Box" (1999)
- "In From the Commons" (1999)
- "Barry Malzberg Drives a Black Cadillac" (2001)
- "The Valley of the Gardens" (2007)
- "Ex Cathedra" (2008)
- "CHECKSUM Checkmate" (2012)
- "The Heretic" (excerpt) (2013) with David Drake
- "Frog Water" (2013)
- "And to All a Good Night" (2013)
- "Hell Hounds" (2015)
- "The Powhatan" (2017)
