= List of American conservatives =

American conservatism is a broad system of political beliefs in the United States characterized by respect for American traditions, republicanism, support for Judeo-Christian values, moral absolutism, free markets and free trade, anti-communism, individualism, advocacy of American exceptionalism, and a defense of Western culture from the threats, whether real or perceived, posed by anarchism, communism, socialism, Islamism, liberalism, progressivism, authoritarianism, and moral relativism. The recent movement is based in the Republican Party, though some Democrats were also important figures early in the movement's history.

The following list is made up of prominent American conservatives from the public and private sectors. The list also includes political parties, organizations and media outlets which have made a notable impact on conservatism in the United States. Entries on the list must have achieved notability after 1932, the beginning of the Fifth Party System. Before 1932, terminology was different. Positions that are called conservative after 1932, were typically called "liberal" (i.e. classical liberal) before then. Likewise European liberals, such as Friedrich Hayek, were called conservatives when they came to America, which puzzled Hayek.

== People ==
=== Intellectuals, writers, consultants and activists ===
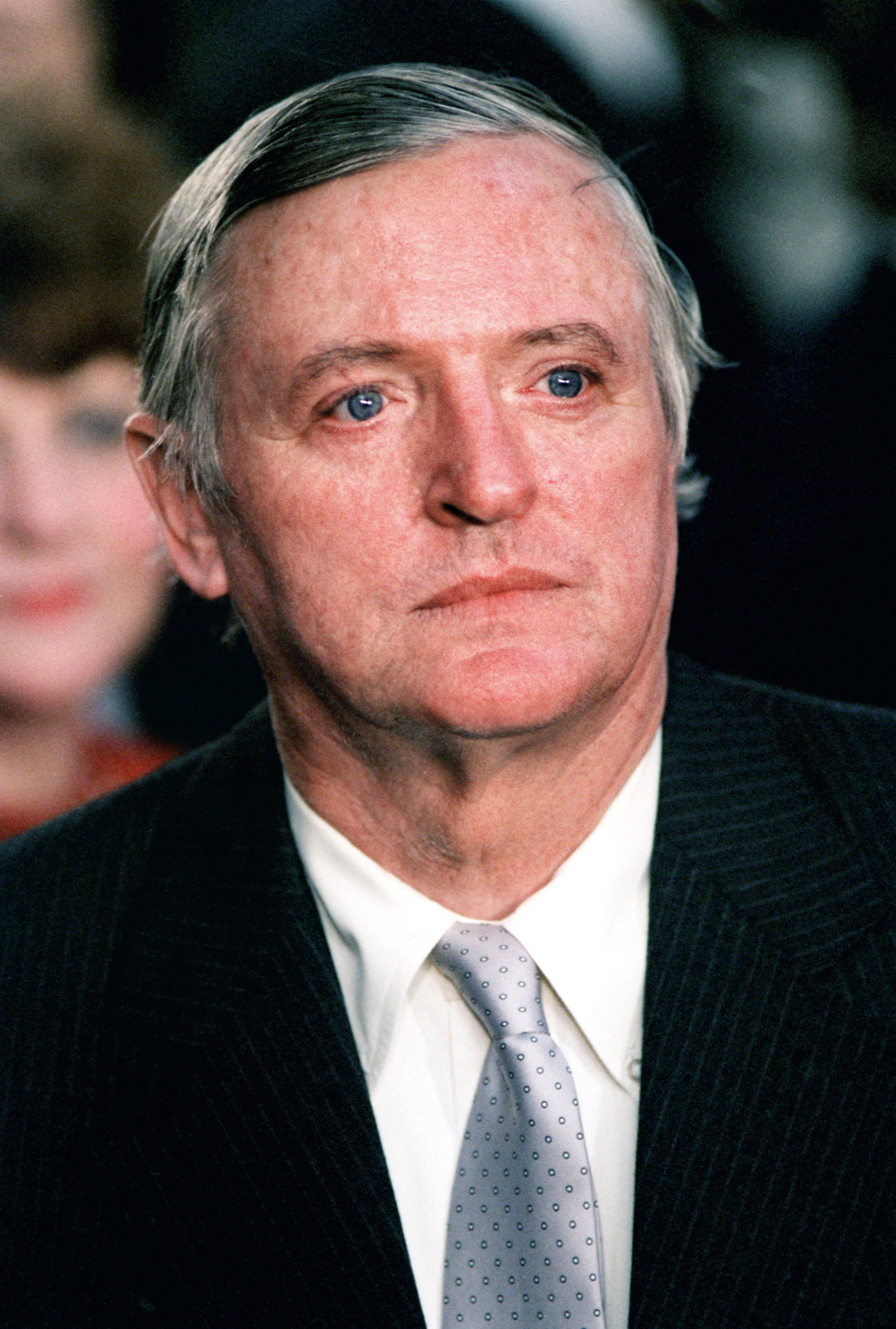
William F. Buckley Jr., conservative writer

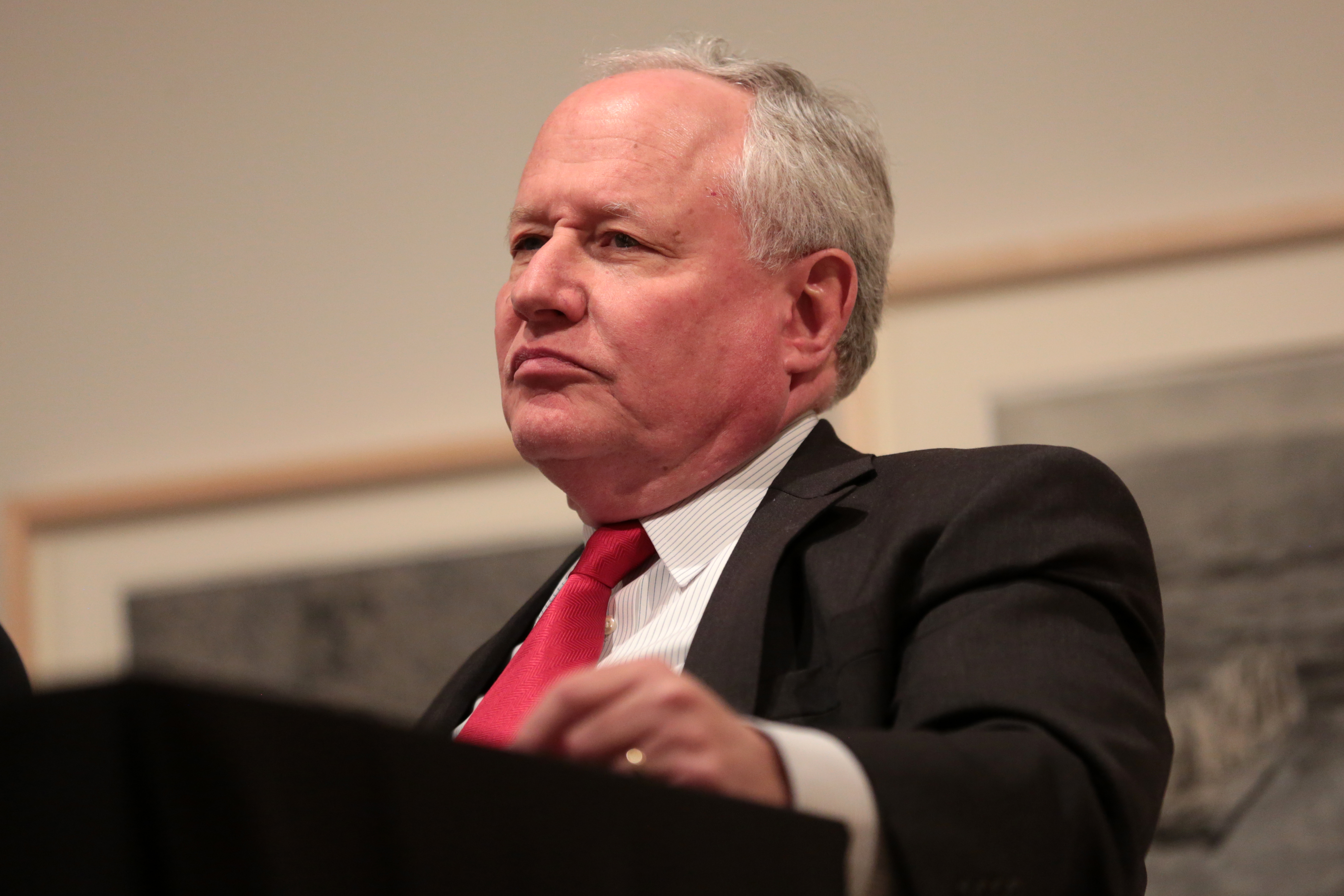
Bill Kristol, conservative writer

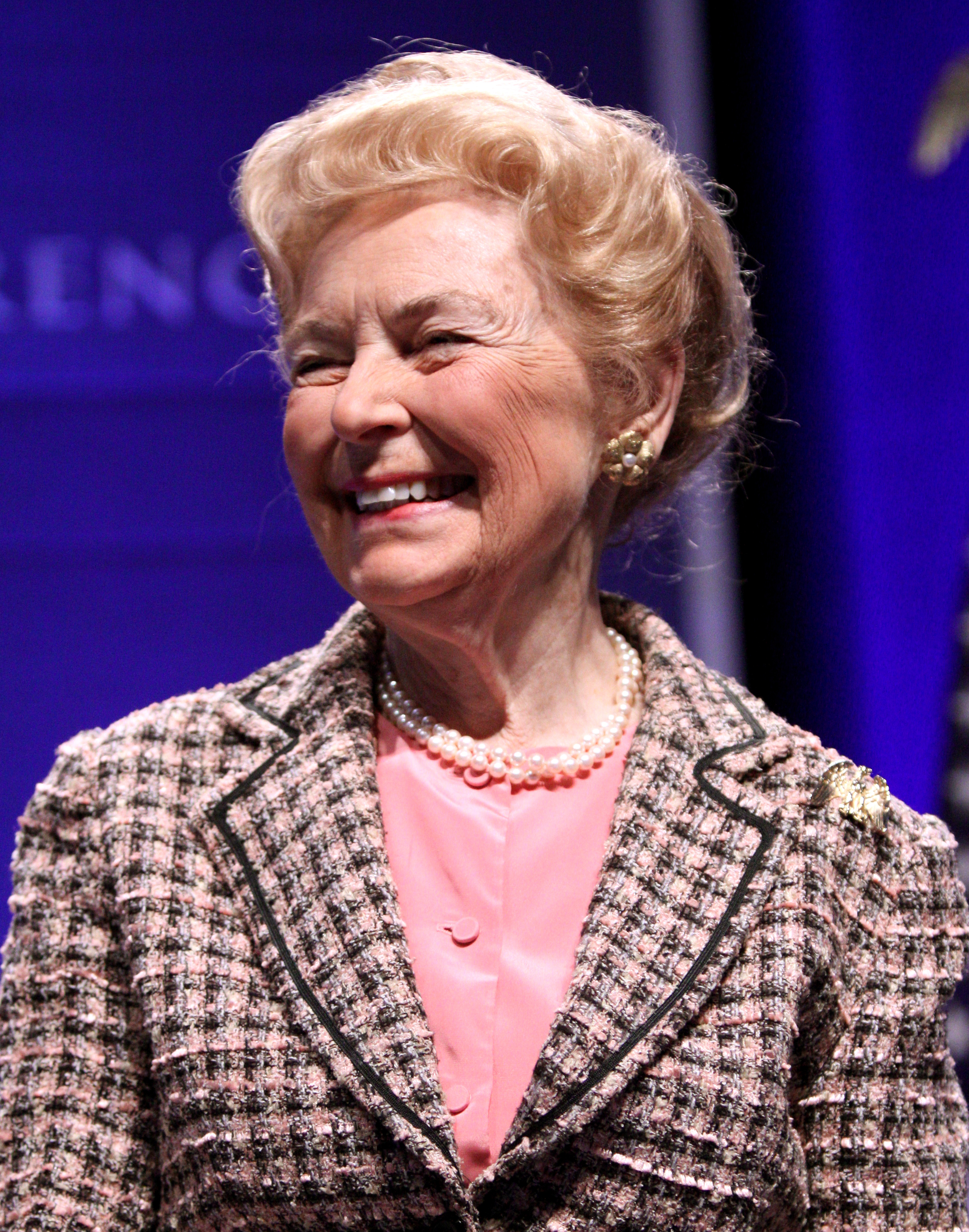
Phyllis Schlafly speaking at CPAC 2011

Name	Lifetime	Notability	Ref.
Agnes Repplier	1855–1950	essayist, literary critic, and author	
George Santayana	1863–1952	philosopher and author	
Ralph Adams Cram	1863–1942	architect and writer	
Irving Babbitt	1865–1933	literary critic	
Garet Garrett	1878–1954	financial journalist	
H. L. Mencken	1880–1956	essayist and cultural critic	
Joseph Schumpeter	1883–1950	political economist	
Frank Knight	1885–1972	economist	
Pitirim Sorokin	1889–1968	sociologist	
Walter Lippmann	1889–1974	reporter and public intellectual	
Ernst Kantorowicz	1895–1963	historian	
George Schuyler	1895–1977	writer, journalist, and social critic	
Clarence Manion	1896–1979	direct-mailer	
Leo Strauss	1899–1973	political philosopher	
Whittaker Chambers	1901–1961	author of Witness	
Will Herberg	1901–1977	sociologist	
Francis Wilson	1901–1976	political scientist	
Eliseo Vivas	1901–1991	philosopher and literary theorist	
Ross J. S. Hoffman	1902–1979	historian, writer, and educator	
Eric Hoffer	1902–1983	philosopher	
Sidney Hook	1902–1989	philosopher	
George F. Kennan	1904–2005	historian and foreign policy advisor	
James Burnham	1905–1987	political philosopher and co-founder and editor of National Review	
Willard Van Orman Quine	1908–2000	philosopher and logician	
C. Vann Woodward	1908–1999	historian	
Willmoore Kendall	1909–1967	political philosopher	
Frank Meyer	1909–1972	editor of the Books, Arts and Manners section of National Review	
Erik von Kuehnelt-Leddihn	1909–1999	journalist and political philosopher	
Peter Drucker	1909–2005	sociologist, management consultant, and author	
Richard M. Weaver	1910–1963	author of Ideas Have Consequences	
Nathaniel Weyl	1910–2005	economist and author	
George J. Stigler	1911–1991	economist	
Henry B. Veatch	1911–1999	philosopher	
Robert Nisbet	1913–1996	sociologist	
Ernest van den Haag	1914–2002	sociologist	
Daniel J. Boorstin	1914–2004	historian	
Edward C. Banfield	1916–1999	political scientist	
Robert Conquest	1917–2015	historian	
Russell Kirk	1918–1994	author of The Conservative Mind	
Harry V. Jaffa	1918–2015	historian and political philosopher	
Peter J. Stanlis	1919–2011	literacy scholar and councilman	
Daniel Bell	1919–2011	sociologist	
Edmund Pellegrino	1920–2013	bioethicist	
Irving Kristol	1920–2009	Neoconservative author and writer	
Thomas Molnar	1921–2010	political philosopher and historian	
Gaetano L. Vincitorio	1921 2007	historian	
Philip Rieff	1922–2006	sociologist and cultural critic	
Robert Goldwin	1922–2010	political scientist	
Gertrude Himmelfarb	1922–2019	historian	
William A. Rusher	1923–2011	publisher of National Review	
James E. Bunce	1924–2015	historian	
Stanley Jaki	1924–2009	philosopher of science and historian	
Phyllis Schlafly	1924–2016	activist	
John Lukacs	1924–2019	historian	
William F. Buckley Jr.	1925–2008	author, television host, and founder of National Review	
L. Brent Bozell Jr.	1926–1997	speechwriter for Senator Joseph McCarthy	
Tim LaHaye	1926–2016	author and political activist	
Forrest McDonald	1927–2016	historian	
Roy Cohn	1927–1986	lawyer, political activist, former chief counsel to the Permanent Subcommittee on Investigations	
Paul W. Schroeder	1927–2020	historian	
Eva Brann	1927–2024	classicist	
Hilton Kramer	1928–2012	art critic	
Nicholas Rescher	1928–2024	philosopher and polymath	
Beverly LaHaye	1929–2024	activist and founder of Concerned Women for America	
Paul M. Bator	1929–1989	legal scholar and former government official	
Allan Bloom	1930–1992	classicist and philosopher	
Seth Benardete	1930–2001	classicist and philosopher	
Eugene Genovese	1930–2012	historian	
Gary Becker	1930–2014	Nobel Prize winning economist	
Norman Podhoretz	1930–2025	political commentator	
Thomas Sowell	1930–	author, columnist, professor, and economist at the Hoover Institution	
James Q. Wilson	1931–2012	social scientist	
Christopher Lasch	1932–1994	historian and social critic	
Harvey Mansfield	1932–	political philosopher	
Ben Wattenberg	1933–2015	political commentator and demographer	
Richard Viguerie	1933–	media pioneer	
Mel Bradford	1934–1993	literary critic and legal scholar	
Richard E. Morgan	1934–2014	political scientist and constitutional theorist	
Charles A. Fried	1935–2024	legal scholar and former jurist	
Richard John Neuhaus	1936–2009	founder of First Things	
John Kekes	1936–	philosopher	
Daniel N. Robinson	1937–2018	philosopher and psychologist	
Peter Kreeft	1937–	philosopher	
Walter E. Williams	1938–2020	author, columnist, and economics professor	
James Kurth	1938–	political scientist	
Leon Kass	1939–	philosopher and bioethicist	
Nicholas Capaldi	1939–	philosopher	
David Horowitz	1939–2025	Writer, activist and founder of the David Horowitz Freedom Center	
Arthur Laffer	1940–	economist	
Hadley Arkes	1940–	political scientist	
Virgil Nemoianu	1940–2025	literary critic, essayist, and philosopher	
George Will	1941–	columnist for the Washington Post	
Elizabeth Fox-Genovese	1941–2007	historian	
Edwin Feulner	1941–2025	founder of The Heritage Foundation	
Paul Gottfried	1941–	political philosopher and historian	
Paul Weyrich	1942–2008	president of The Heritage Foundation	
Angelo Codevilla	1943–2021	international relations theorist and philosopher	
Claes G. Ryn	1943–	political philosopher	
Charles Murray	1943–	political scientist	
Robert Barro	1944–	economist	
Fouad Ajami	1945–2014	political scientist	
Scott Soames	1945–	philosopher	
George H. Nash	1945–	historian	
Joseph Sobran	1946–2010	writer for National Review	
William S. Lind	1947–	military author	
Donald T. Critchlow	1948–	historian	
Vigen Guroian	1948–	theologian	
Glenn Loury	1948–	economist	
Charles Krauthammer	1950–2018	public intellectual	
Peggy Noonan	1950–	columnist for The Wall Street Journal	
Larry Schweikart	1951–	historian	
Wilfred M. McClay	1951–	historian	
Peter Augustine Lawler	1952–2017	political scientist and philosopher	
Bill Kristol	1952–	former editor of The Weekly Standard	
Jennifer Roback Morse	1953–	economist, writer, and activist	
Roger Kimball	1953–	art critic and editor of The New Criterion	
Victor Davis Hanson	1953–	classicist and military historian	
Carol Swain	1954–	Former political science professor at Vanderbilt University	
L. Brent Bozell III	1955–	Activist, writer, Media Research Center founder	
Daniel Bonevac	1955–	philosopher	
Terry Teachout	1956–2022	drama critic, biographer, and playwright	
Grover Norquist	1956–	president of Americans for Tax Reform	
Robert P. George	1969–	legal scholar and political philosopher	
James Hankins	1955–	historian	
Patrick Allitt	1956–	historian	
Heather Mac Donald	1956–	political commentator	
Robert C. Koons	1957–	philosopher	
John J. DiIulio Jr.	1958–	political scientist	
Andrew Stuttaford	1958–	journalist and editor	
Mark Bauerlein	1959–	literary critic and senior editor of First Things	
R. R. Reno	1959–	theologian, political philosopher, and the editor of First Things	
Dinesh D'Souza	1961–	author and filmmaker	
Jonathan Turley	1961–	legal scholar and writer	
Andrew Schlafly	1961–	Conservapedia founder, lawyer and Christian conservative activist	
Frank Luntz	1962–	political consultant and pollster	
Kevin R. C. Gutzman	1963–	historian and constitutional scholar	
David Tse-Chien Pan	1963–	literary scholar	
Patrick Deneen	1964–	political theorist	
Yoram Hazony	1964–	political theorist and philosopher	
Elizabeth Price Foley	1965–	legal scholar and bioethicist	
John Yoo	1967–	legal scholar and former government official	
Keith E. Whittington	1968–	political scientist and legal scholar	
Christopher Tollefsen	1968–	philosopher	
Edward Feser	1968–	political philosopher	
Adrian Vermeule	1968–	legal scholar	
Robert P. George	1969–	legal scholar and political philosopher	
W. Bradford Wilcox	1970–	sociologist	
Mark Regnerus	1970–	sociologist	
Leigh-Allyn Baker	1972–	actress and pro-life activist	
Yuval Levin	1977–	political scientist and journalist	
Razib Khan	1977–	geneticist and science writer	
Ross Douthat	1979–	columnist for the New York Times	
Stephen E. Sachs	1980–	legal scholar	
William Baude	1982–	legal scholar	
Gladden Pappin	1982–	political theorist	
Charlie Kirk	1993–2025	conservative activist	

=== Politicians, office holders, and jurists ===
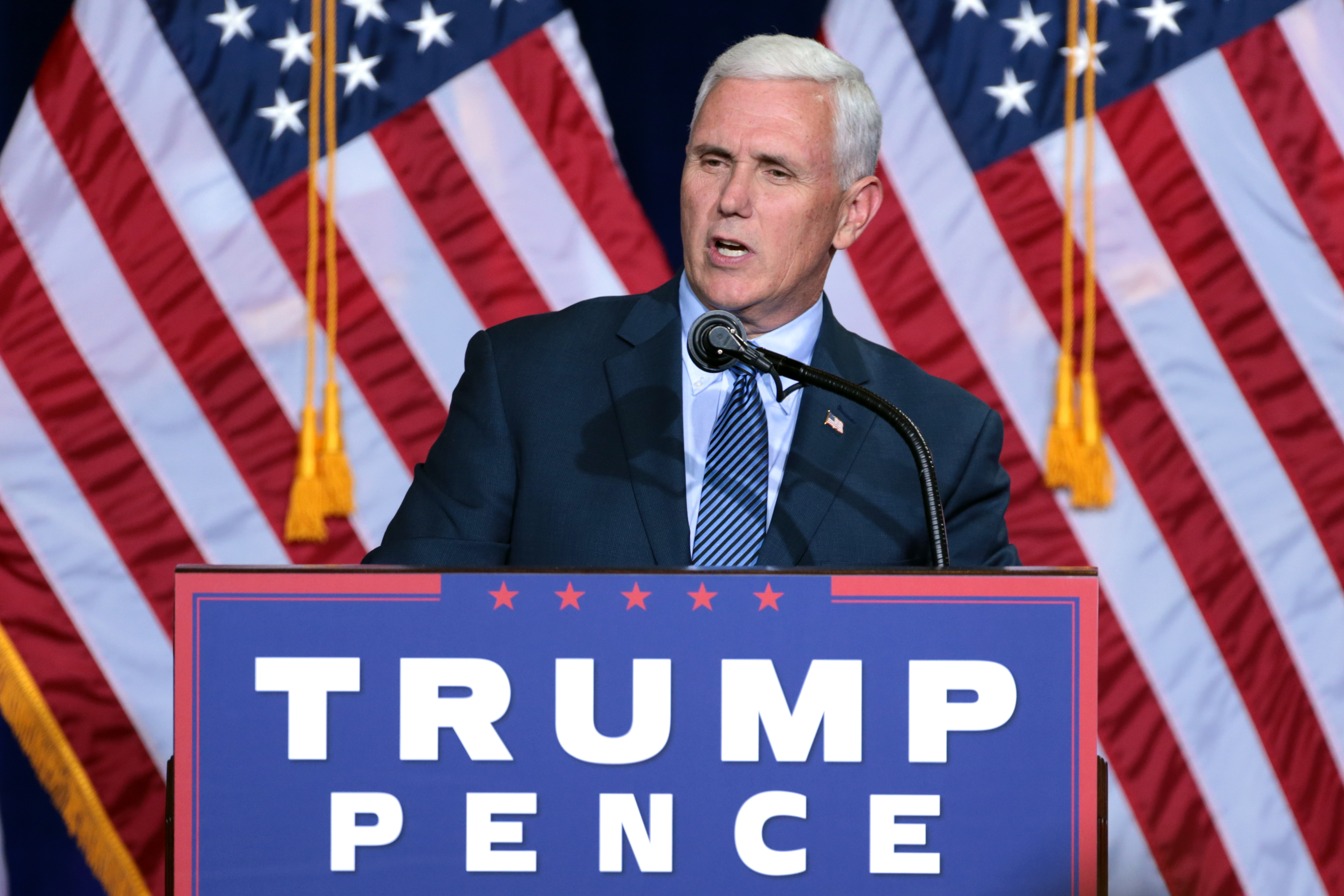
Mike Pence speaks at a campaign rally in Phoenix, Arizona, August 2016.

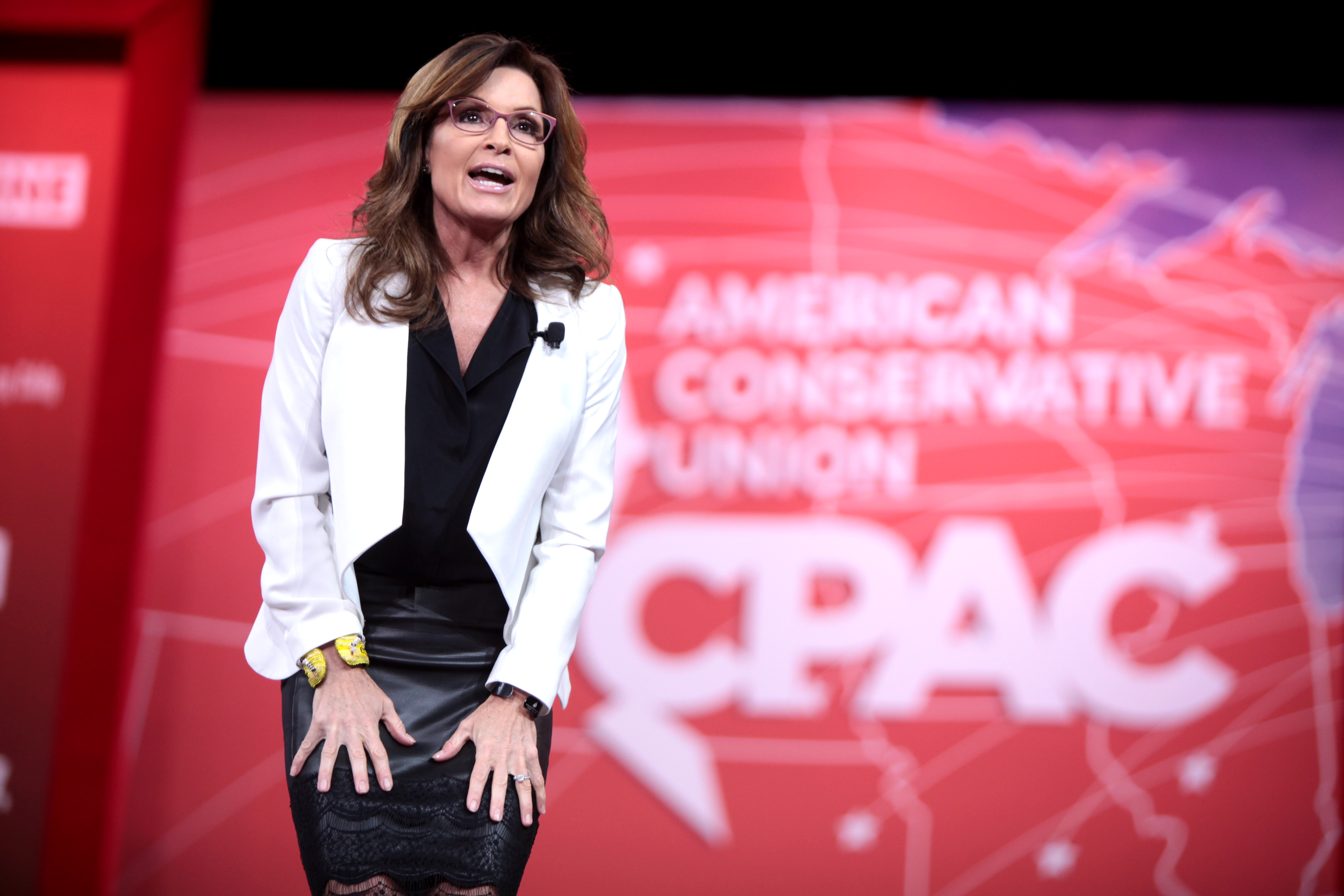
Sarah Palin speaking at CPAC 2015

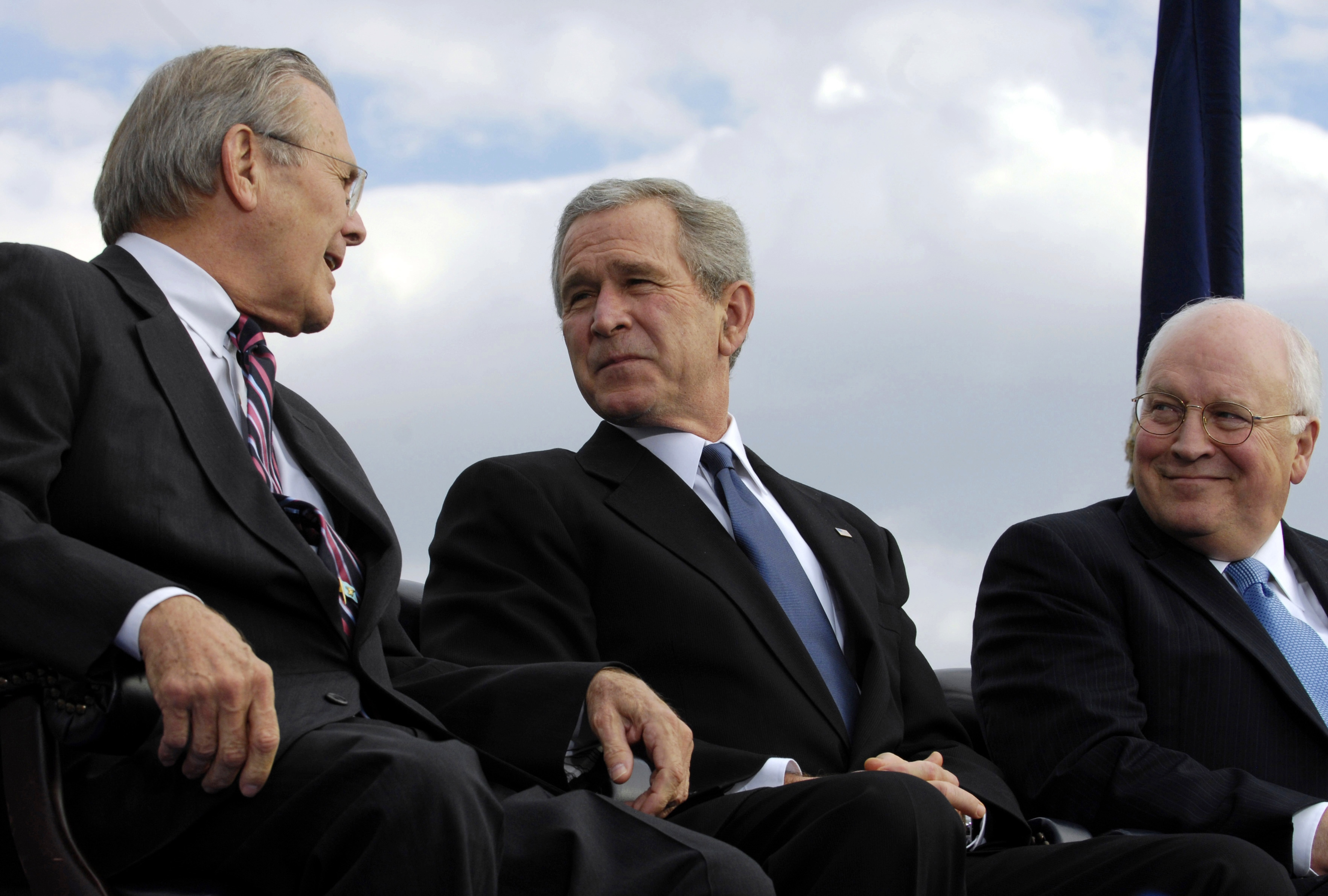
Vice President Dick Cheney (right) with Defense Secretary Donald Rumsfeld (left) and President George W. Bush (center)

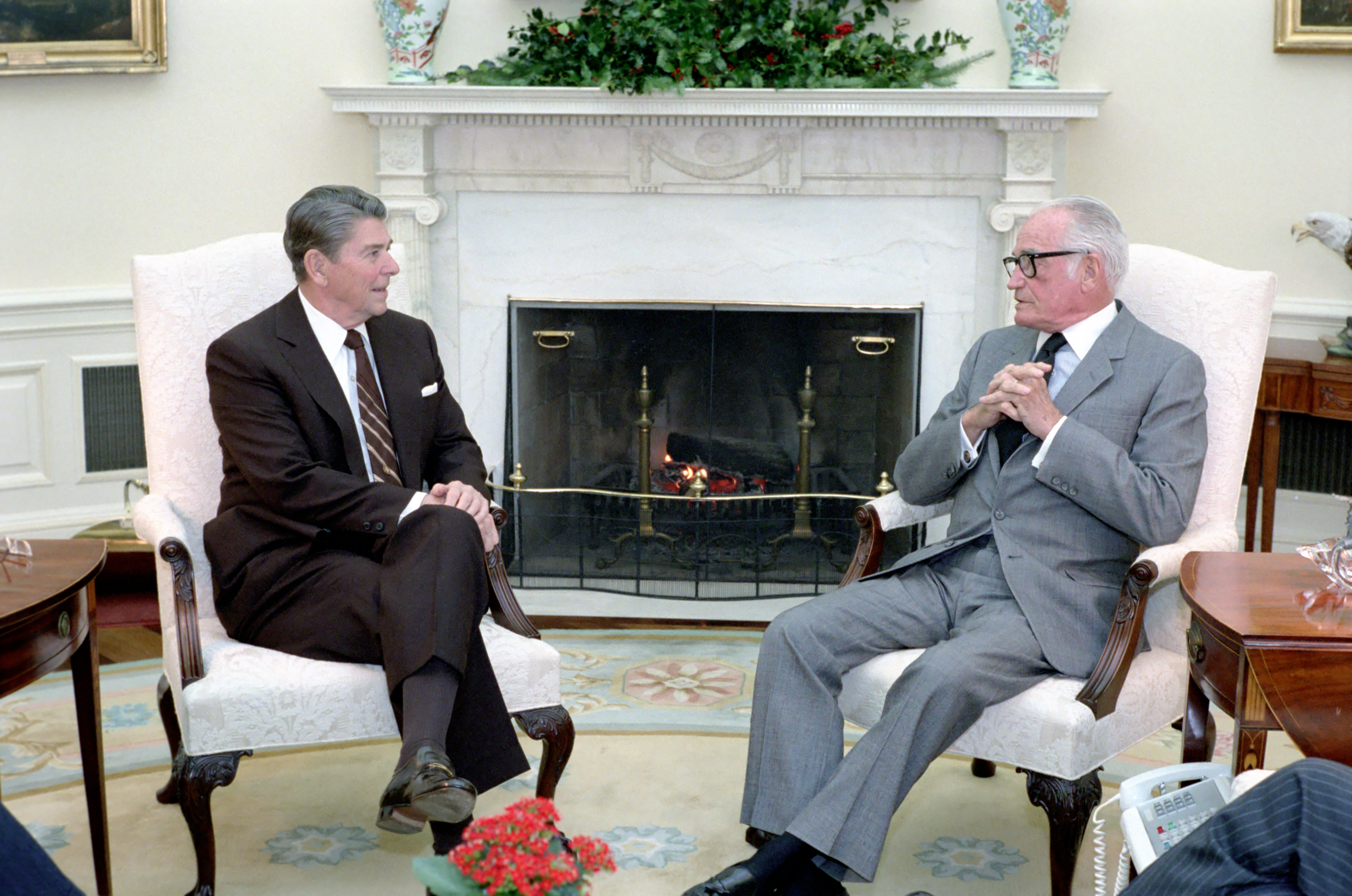
Senator Barry Goldwater (right) meeting with President Ronald Reagan (left) in the oval office in 1984

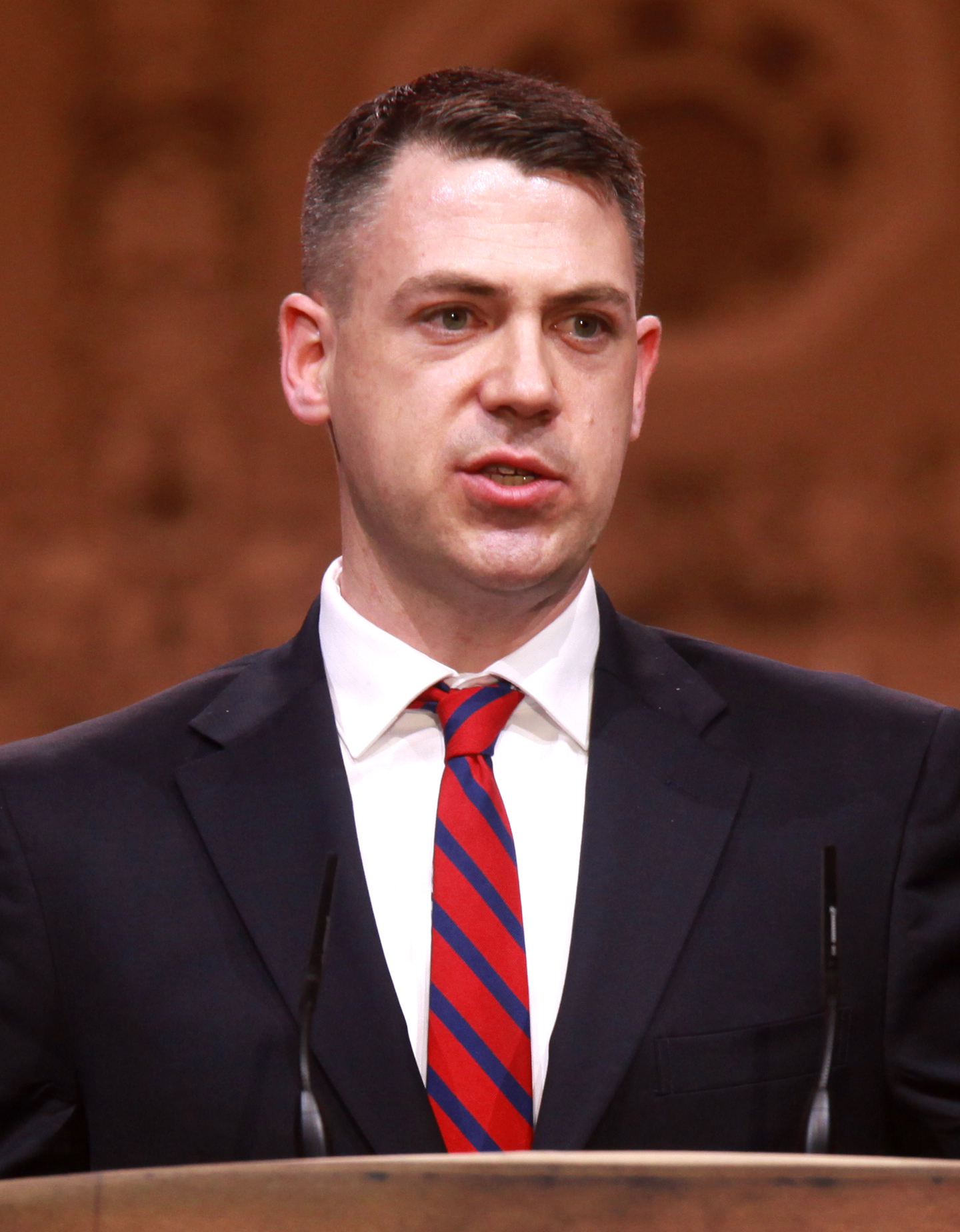
Senator Jim Banks at CPAC, 2014.

Name	Lifetime	Notability	Ref.
President Grover Cleveland	1837–1908	22nd and 24th President of the United States	
President William McKinley	1843–1901	25th President of the United States	
President Calvin Coolidge	1872–1933	30th President of the United States	
Senator Arthur H. Vandenberg	1884–1951	Known for his opposition to the New Deal	
Senator Robert A. Taft	1889–1953	First chairman of the Senate Republican Policy Committee	
Senator John W. Bricker	1893–1986	Thomas E. Dewey's running mate in the 1944 presidential election	
Senator Everett Dirksen	1896–1969	Republican senator who helped get the Civil Rights Act passed	
Ambassador Clare Boothe Luce	1903–1987	Politician, writer, and ambassador	
Senator Joseph McCarthy	1908–1957	Known for his principal role in the Red Scare of the 1950s	
Senator Barry Goldwater	1909–1998	1964 Republican presidential nominee	
President Ronald Reagan	1911–2004	40th President of the United States	
Mayor Charles Evers	1922–2020	Civil rights activist, businessman, and Mayor of Fayette	
Secretary of State Henry Kissinger	1923–2023	Secretary of State during the Richard Nixon and Gerald Ford administrations	
Chief Justice William Rehnquist	1924–2005	Chief Justice of the Supreme Court	
Congressman James Edmund Jeffries	1925–1997	Member, United States House of Representatives from Kansas (1979–1983)	
UN Ambassador Jeane Kirkpatrick	1926–2006	Ambassador to the United Nations under Ronald Reagan	
Ambassador Shirley Temple	1928–2014	Ambassador to Czechoslovakia	
Attorney General Edwin Meese	1931–	Attorney General during the Reagan Administration	
Defense Secretary Donald Rumsfeld	1932–2021	Defense Secretary during the Gerald Ford and George W. Bush administrations	
Congressman Jack Kemp	1935–2009	1996 Republican vice presidential nominee known for his support of supply-side economics and urban renewal	
Congressman Larry McDonald	1935–1983	Served as President of the John Birch Society	
Congressman Ron Paul	1935–	Presidential candidate (1988 Libertarian Party nominee, 2008 Republican candidate, 2012 Republican candidate) who promoted a libertarian agenda within the Republican Party	
Justice Antonin Scalia	1936–2016	Supreme Court Justice known as a leading exponent of originalism and textualism	
White House Communications Director Pat Buchanan	1938–	White House communications director under President Ronald Reagan, paleoconservative advisor to multiple presidents; prominent commentator and co-founder of The American Conservative; Republican presidential candidate in 1992 and 1996; Reform Party nominee for president in 2000	
House Majority Leader Dick Armey	1940–	One of the chief authors of the Contract with America	
Vice President Dick Cheney	1941–2025	Influential Vice-President under Bush. Jr. and Defenese Secretary under Bush. Sr. known for his hawkish views on national security	
Senator Mitch McConnell	1942–	Senate Republican Leader	
Attorney General John Ashcroft	1942–	Attorney General during the George W. Bush administration	
Speaker of the House Newt Gingrich	1943–	Chief author of the Contract with America, Speaker of the House, 2012 presidential candidate known for his criticism of the Clinton, G. W. Bush, and Obama administrations	
President Donald Trump	1946–	45th and 47th President of the United States	
President George W. Bush	1946–	43rd President of the United States	
Senator Mitt Romney	1947–	Senator from Utah since 2019, 2012 Republican presidential nominee, 2008 Republican presidential candidate, Governor of Massachusetts (2003–2007),	
UN Ambassador John R. Bolton	1948–	National Security Advisor (2018–2019), U.N. ambassador (2005–2006), and foreign policy hawk	
Justice Clarence Thomas	1948–	Supreme Court Justice, most prominent African-American conservative jurist in American history	
Deputy Chief of Staff Karl Rove	1950–	Political strategist to George W. Bush	
Senator Jim DeMint	1951–	Tea Party-affiliated U.S. Senator, president of the Heritage Foundation	
Secretary of State Condoleezza Rice	1954–	Secretary of State and National Security Advisor during the George W. Bush administration	
Congresswoman Michele Bachmann	1956–	Sought the 2012 Republican nomination for president, member of the U.S. House of Representatives from Minnesota	
Vice President Mike Pence	1959–	Vice President under Donald Trump, governor of Indiana, member of the U.S. House of Representatives from Indiana	
Senator Rand Paul	1963–	U.S. Senator from Kentucky, libertarian-leaning conservative, 2016 GOP presidential candidate and son of Ron Paul	
Governor Sarah Palin	1964–	Governor of Alaska, 2008 Republican vice presidential nominee|	
Senator Tim Scott	1965–	Senator from South Carolina, only African-American Republican senator, 2024 GOP presidential candidate	
Attorney General Kris Kobach	1966–	Secretary of State and Attorney General of Kansas	
Senator Ted Cruz	1970–	Tea Party-affiliated U.S. Senator who finished second in the 2016 Republican presidential primaries	
Speaker of the House Paul Ryan	1970–	Speaker of the House, 2012 Republican vice-presidential nominee, member of the U.S. House of Representatives from Wisconsin chairing economic committees	
Secretary of State Marco Rubio	1971–	Secretary of State and National Security Advisor under the second presidency of Donald Trump, U.S. Senator from Florida, 2016 GOP presidential candidate	
Speaker of the House Mike Johnson	1972–	Speaker of the House, known for his work with the Trump Administration and criticism of the Biden Administration	
Secretary of War/Secretary of Defense Pete Hegseth	1980–	Secretary of Defense later renamed Secretary of War under the second presidency of Donald Trump, former Fox News contributor	
Representative Dan Crenshaw	1984–	Former United States Navy SEAL officer and U.S. representative for Texas's 2nd congressional district	
Vice President JD Vance	1984–	Vice-President and former U.S. Senator from Ohio, The first Millennial sworn in as vice president	
Representative Bill Hardwick	1985–	Missouri State Legislator	

=== Business and religious leaders involved in conservative politics ===
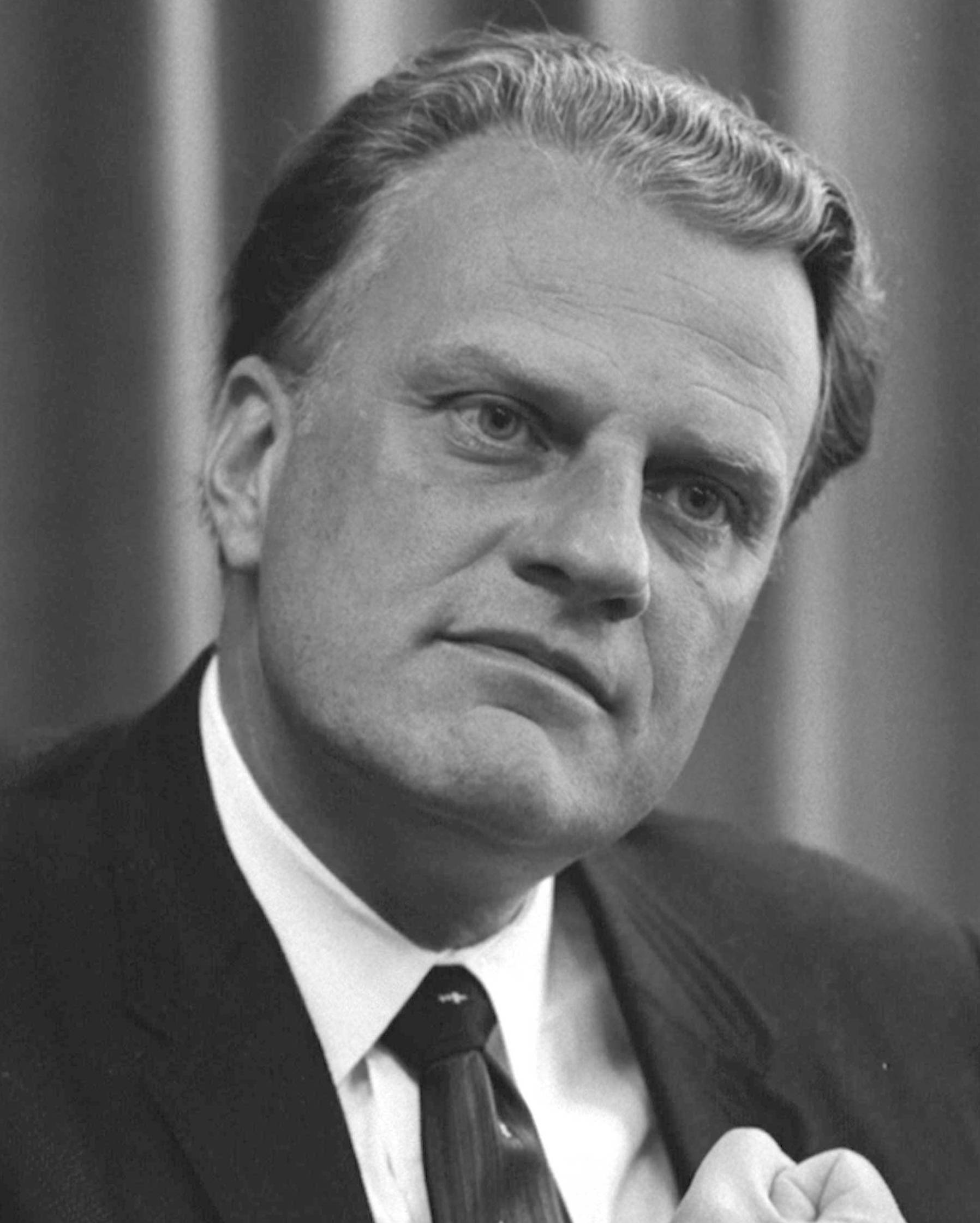
Billy Graham, evangelical minister

Name	Lifetime	Notability	Ref.
Norman Vincent Peale	1898–1993	author, minister, chairman of the National Committee to Uphold Constitutional Government	
Roger Milliken	1915–2010	businessman	
Joseph Coors	1917–2003	businessman	
Billy Graham	1918–2018	Evangelist known for his support of capitalism	
Sun Myung Moon	1920–2012	Founder of the Unification Church	
Richard DeVos	1926–2018	Co-founder of Amway	
Pat Robertson	1930–2023	Televangelist, Christian Broadcasting Network founder and chairman and The 700 Club host and 1988 Presidential candidate	
Rupert Murdoch	1931–	CEO of News Corp and 21st Century Fox	
Richard Mellon Scaife	1932–2014	billionaire donor to conservative organizations	
Sheldon Adelson	1933–2021	billionaire donor to conservative political candidates	
Jerry Falwell	1933–2007	televangelist	
Charles G. Koch	1935–	billionaire industrialist and donor to conservative organizations and candidates	
Foster Friess	1940–2021	billionaire donor to conservative organizations	
David H. Koch	1940–2019	billionaire industrialist and donor to conservative organizations and candidates	
Richard Land	1946–	former lobbyist for the Southern Baptist Convention	
Robert Mercer	1946–	donor to conservative organizations such as Breitbart News	
Franklin Graham	1952–	evangelist and political activist	
Tony Perkins	1963–	chairman of the Family Research Council	
Peter Thiel	1967–	venture capitalist and political activist	
Elon Musk	1971–	Founder, CEO, and chief engineer of SpaceX, CEO and product architect of Tesla Inc, co-founder of Neuralink, founder of the Boring Company, and chairman of X Corp	
Russell Moore	1971–	president of the Ethics & Religious Liberty Commission of the Southern Baptist Convention	

=== Media personalities: publishers, editors, radio hosts, columnists and bloggers ===
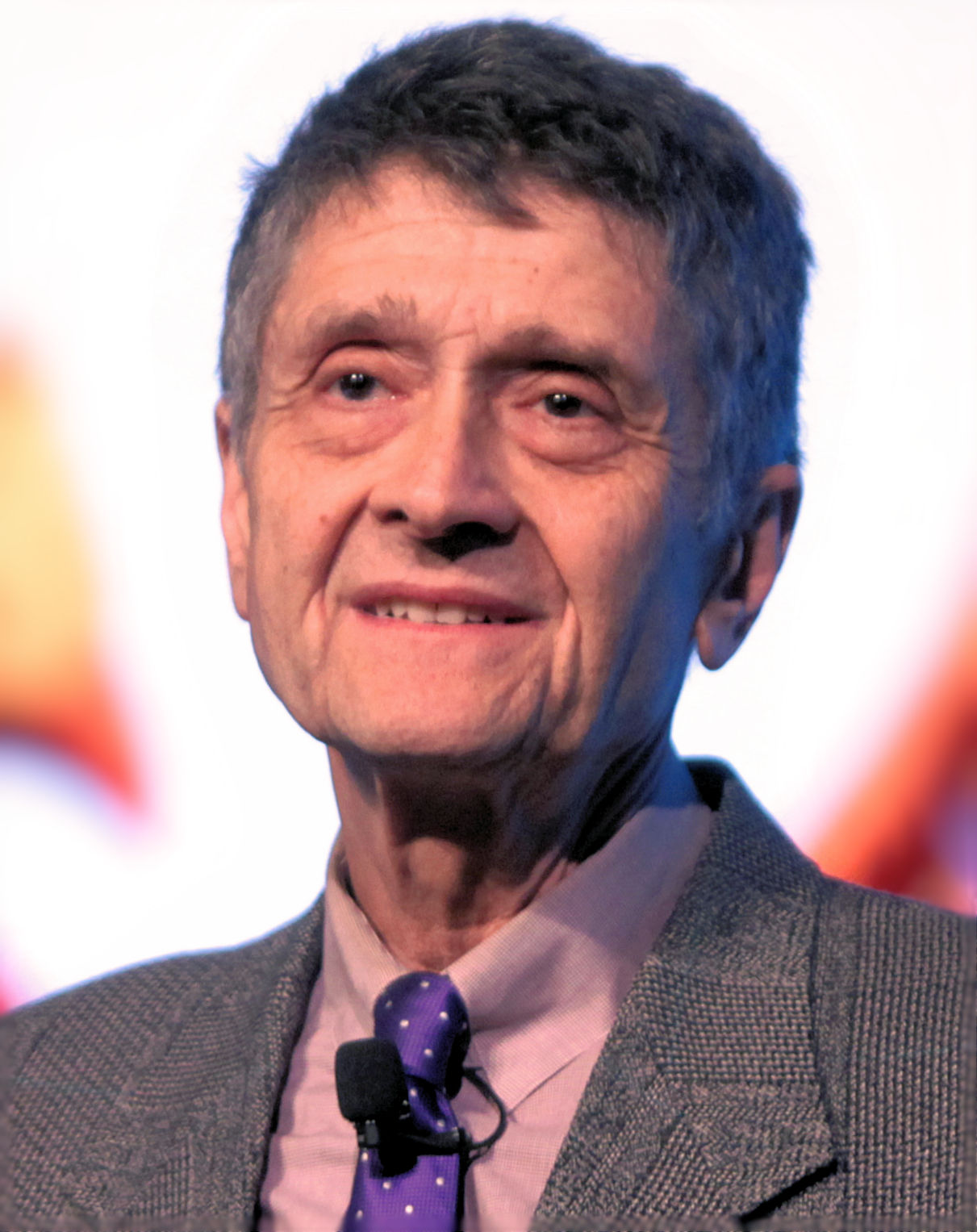
Michael Medved, conservative radio show host

Name	Lifetime	Notability	Ref.
Raymond Moley	1886–1975	columnist	
David Lawrence	1888–1973	author of Beyond the New Deal	
Clarence Manion	1896–1979	talk radio host	
Henry Luce	1898–1967	founder of Time	
Fulton Lewis	1903–1966	radio host	
Henry Regnery	1912–1996	activist	
Paul Harvey	1918–2009	radio commentator	
Bob Grant	1929–2013	talk show host	
William Safire	1929–2009	commentator for The New York Times	
Morton Downey Jr.	1932–2001	radio and talk show host	
Roger Ailes	1940–2017	president of Fox News	
Michael Savage	1942–	talk radio host	
Herman Cain	1945–2020	radio host, syndicated columnist, and candidate in the 2012 Republican presidential primaries	
Lou Dobbs	1945–2024	television newscaster	
Sam Francis	1947–2005	columnist	
Michael Medved	1948–	talk radio host	
Dennis Prager	1948–	talk radio host	
Bill O'Reilly	1949–	television and radio host	
Rush Limbaugh	1951–2021	talk radio host	
Roger Stone	1952–	activist, commentator, consultant, and lobbyist	
Larry Elder	1952–	filmmaker	
Charlie Sykes	1954–	talk show host	
Hugh Hewitt	1956–	talk radio host	
Sean Hannity	1961–	host of Hannity and The Sean Hannity Show	
Ann Coulter	1961–	political commentator	
Laura Ingraham	1963–	Fox News and talk radio commentator	
Adam Carolla	1964–	co-host of Loveline and host of The Adam Carolla Show	
Greg Gutfeld	1964–	Fox News host, commentator and comedian	
Matt Drudge	1966–	creator and editor of the Drudge Report	
Andrew Breitbart	1969–2012	blogger, author, journalist, and creator of Breitbart News	
Tucker Carlson	1969–	talk show host	
Michelle Malkin	1970–	newspaper columnist, author, and blogger	
Erick Erickson	1975–	Talk radio host and blogger	
Jesse Watters	1978–	Commentator and host of Jesse Watters Primetime on Fox News	
Ben Shapiro	1984–	commentator and media host	
Christopher F. Rufo	1984–	journalist, activist, and commentator	
Matt Walsh	1986–	political commentator and author	
Lucian Wintrich	1988–	artist and media personality	
Blaire White	1993–	political commentator and YouTuber	
Brett Cooper	2001–	political commentator and actress	
Peachy Keenan	Unknown	pseudonymous cultural commentator	

=== Painters, printmakers and sculptors ===
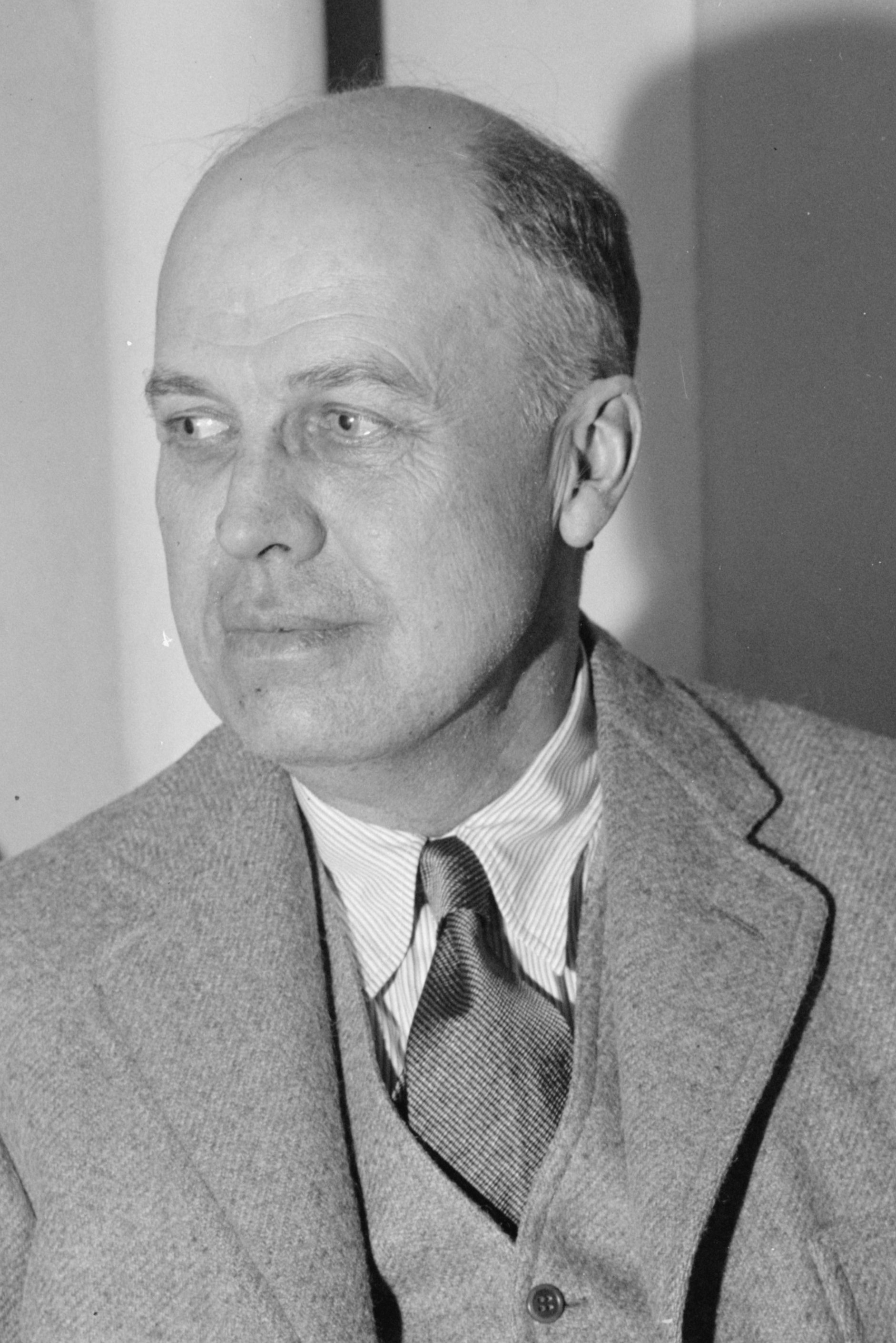
Conservative in politics and social matters, Hopper asserted for example that artists' lives should be written by people very close to them. However, he accepted things as they were and displayed a lack of idealism.

Name	Lifetime	Notability	Ref.
Edward Hopper	1882–1967	Renowned American Realist painter and printmaker known for his oil-on-canvas paintings including Nighthawks	
Wheeler Williams	1887–1972	American sculptor	
Minerva Teichert	1888–1976	20th-century artist who painted Western and Mormon subjects	
Sam Hyde Harris	1889–1977	American painter associated with the California Impressionism movement	
Henriette Wyeth	1907–1997	American artist noted for her portraits and still life paintings	
Andrew Wyeth	1917–2009	American regionalist painter and one of the best-known U.S. artists of the middle 20th century	
Patricia Hill Burnett	1920–2014	Portrait artist and women's rights activist	
Brigid Berlin	1939–2020	American artist and Warhol superstar	

=== Composers, musicians and record producers ===
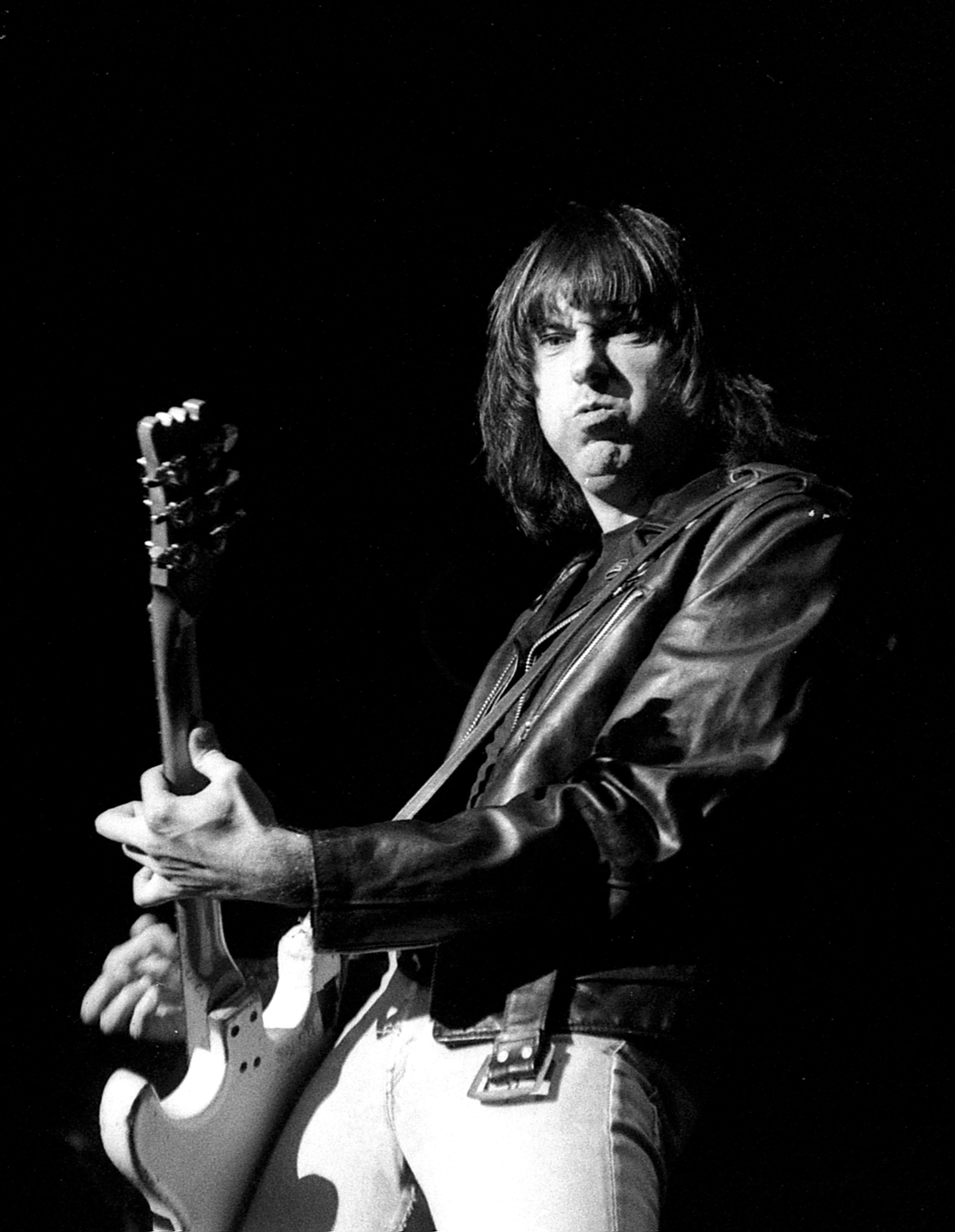
Punk rock pioneer Johnny Ramone was into conservative politics as early as age 11. This was evident when he rooted for Richard Nixon in the 1960 United States presidential election

Name	Lifetime	Notability	Ref.
Charles Ives	1874–1954	Influential modernist composer	
Emma Lucy Gates Bowen	1882–1951	American operatic soprano singer	
Igor Stravinsky	1882–1971	Russian-American composer of ballets including The Firebird, Petrushka, and The Rite of Spring	
Irving Berlin	1888–1989	Russian-born American composer and songwriter	
William Grant Still	1895–1978	American composer of nearly two hundred works, including five symphonies, four ballets, nine operas, over thirty choral works, art songs, chamber music, and solo works	
Duke Ellington	1899–1974	American jazz pianist and composer	
Hoagy Carmichael	1899–1981	One of the most successful Tin Pan Alley songwriters of the 1930s	
Lionel Hampton	1908–2002	Jazz musician and bandleader	
Bernard Herrmann	1911–1975	American composer and conductor best known for his work in film scoring	
Tony Martin	1913–2012	American big band, traditional pop singer	
Sun Ra	1914–1993	Avant-garde jazz composer and bandleader	
Frank Sinatra	1915–1998	One of the most popular entertainers of the mid-20th century	
Milton Babbitt	1916–2011	Pioneering composer of electronic music and music theorist	
Dean Martin	1917–1995	One of the most popular entertainers of the mid-20th century	
Liberace	1919–1987	Pianist, singer and performer known for his flamboyant stage persona	
Hank Williams	1923–1953	Influential singer-songwriter of country music	
Marty Robbins	1925–1982	Early outlaw country pioneer	
Andy Williams	1927–2012	Traditional pop singer	
Tom Wilson	1931–1978	American record producer	
Tiny Tim	1932–1996	Outsider artist and musical archivist	
Loretta Lynn	1932–2022	Country music singer and songwriter	
James Brown	1933–2006	Central progenitor of funk music often referred as the Godfather of Soul	
Frankie Valli	1934–	Known as the frontman of The Four Seasons	
Pat Boone	1934–	American pop singer	
Elvis Presley	1935–1977	American singer and cultural figure known as the King of Rock and Roll	
Sonny Bono	1935–1998	One half of the pop duo Sonny & Cher	
Jerry Lee Lewis	1935–2022	Piano-based singer-songwriter and pioneer of rock and roll and rockabilly music	
Charlie Daniels	1936–2020	Southern rock pioneer and country rock musician	
Jerry Reed	1937–2008	Country music composer and an early influence on the swamp rock genre	
Dick Dale	1937–2019	Influential guitarist and surf music pioneer	
Charles Wuorinen	1938–2020	Academic teacher and composer of contemporary classical music	
Kenny Rogers	1938–2020	Country music singer and songwriter	
Phil Everly	1939–2014	One half of the country rock duo The Everly Brothers	
Ray Stevens	1939–	Novelty country pop singer-songwriter	
Dion DiMucci	1939–	Prominent rock and roll musician	
Frank Zappa	1940–1993	Composer, musician, founding member of the avant-garde band The Mothers Of Invention	
Bruce Johnston	1942–	Member of The Beach Boys	
Roger McGuinn	1942–	Leader and only consistent member of the folk and psychedelic rock band The Byrds	
Lee Greenwood	1942–	American patriotic music singer	
Tommy Hall	1943–	Electric jug player and founding member of the psychedelic rock band 13th Floor Elevators	
Richie Furay	1944–	Vocalist, guitarist and writer of folk rock band Buffalo Springfield	
Moe Tucker	1944–	Drummer and singer-songwriter for the experimental rock band The Velvet Underground	
Iggy Pop	1947–	Vocalist and lyricist of proto-punk propagators The Stooges and often called the Godfather of Punk	
Rick Derringer	1947–	Hard rock musician, producer, and songwriter	
Meat Loaf	1947–2022	Rock opera singer	
Alice Cooper	1948–	Shock rock singer	
Billy Zoom	1948–	Guitarist for the punk rock band X	
Mark Farner	1948–	Original singer and guitarist of the hard rock band Grand Funk Railroad	
Johnny Ramone	1948–2004	Founding member and guitarist of the influential punk rock band Ramones	
Ted Nugent	1948–	American guitarist and rock musician	
Hank Williams Jr.	1949–	Country rock musician	
Eric Carmen	1949–2024	Lead vocalist of the power pop band Raspberries	
Gene Simmons	1949–	Bassist and founding member of hard rock band Kiss	
Rickey Medlocke	1950–	Frontman/guitarist for the southern rock band Blackfoot and member of Lynyrd Skynyrd	
Jonathan Cain	1950–	Keyboardist and rhythm guitarist for Journey	
Lee Ving	1950–	Frontman of the LA-based hardcore punk band Fear	
Joey Kramer	1950–	Drummer of Aerosmith	
Joe Perry	1950–	Founding member and lead guitarist of Aerosmith	
Ace Frehley	1951–2025	Lead guitarist and founding member of hard rock band Kiss	
Joe Lynn Turner	1951–	Known for his work in hard rock bands Rainbow and Deep Purple	
Dee Dee Ramone	1951–2002	Founding member and bassist of the influential punk rock band Ramones	
Billy Sheehan	1953–	Bassist in glam metal band Mr. Big and hard rock supergroup The Winery Dogs	
Don Dokken	1953–	Lead singer and founder of glam metal band Dokken	
Ross the Boss	1954–	Founding member of proto-punk band The Dictators and heavy metal band Manowar	
Martin O'Donnell	1955–	Video game composer for games including Halo and Destiny	
Glenn Danzig	1955–	Founder of horror punk innovators The Misfits and frontman of heavy metal band Danzig	
Exene Cervenka	1956–	Singer and songwriter for the punk rock band X	
Bobby Steele	1956–	Guitarist for horror punk innovators The Misfits and frontman for The Undead	
Blackie Lawless	1956–	Frontman of heavy metal band W.A.S.P.	
Leonard Graves Phillips	1957–	Frontman of the comedic punk rock band The Dickies	
Prince	1958–2016	American singer, songwriter and record producer	
John Kezdy	1959–2023	Lead singer of the Chicago hardcore band The Effigies	
Bobby Ellsworth	1959–	Lead vocalist of thrash metal band Overkill	
Cherie Currie	1959–	Lead vocalist of the all-female band The Runaways	
Johnny Van Zant	1960–	Current lead vocalist of southern rock band Lynyrd Skynyrd	
Jack Russell	1960–2024	Lead vocalist of the glam metal band Great White	
Tom Araya	1961–	Vocalist and bassist of thrash metal band Slayer	
Duane Peters	1961–	Leading member of street punk band U.S. Bombs	
Dave Mustaine	1961–	Frontman and primary songwriter of Megadeth	
Peter Steele	1962–2010	Founding member of crossover trash band Carnivore and lead singer, bassist and main composer of gothic metal band Type O Negative	
Trace Adkins	1962–	American country musician	
John Joseph	1962–	Lead singer and lyricist of the hardcore punk band Cro-Mags	
James Kottak	1962–2024	Drummer in the hard rock band Scorpions	
Joe Escalante	1963–	Bassist and songwriter of the comedic punk rock band The Vandals	
Michael Sweet	1963–	Frontman of Christian metal band Stryper	
Dave Smalley	1963–	Lead singer of hardcore punk bands DYS and Dag Nasty	
Jeff Hanneman	1964–2013	Guitarist and founding member of thrash metal band Slayer	
Vinnie Paul	1964–2018	Drummer of groove metal bands Pantera and Damageplan	
Steve Souza	1964–	Lead vocalist for the thrash metal band Exodus	
Roger Miret	1964–	Lead singer of the hardcore punk band Agnostic Front	
Eazy-E	1964–1995	American West Coast gangsta rapper	
Dimebag Darrell	1966–2004	Guitarist of groove metal bands Pantera and Damageplan	
Billy Corgan	1967–	Frontman and primary songwriter of The Smashing Pumpkins	
John Petrucci	1967–	Guitarist of progressive metal band Dream Theater	
Terry Butler	1967–	Bassist for the death metal band Obituary	
Sully Erna	1968–	Vocalist and rhythm guitarist of alternative metal band Godsmack	
Cowboy Troy	1970–	Country rap artist	
Kid Rock	1971–	American singer and rapper	
Sara Evans	1971–	American country music singer and songwriter	
Aaron Lewis	1972–	Frontman of alternative metal band Staind	
John Dolmayan	1972–	Drummer of System of a Down	
Jesse Hughes	1972–	Frontman of the rock band Eagles of Death Metal	
Gretchen Wilson	1973–	American country singer and songwriter	
Pete Parada	1973–	Drummer of several punk rock and metal bands	
John Rich	1974–	American country singer	
Philip Labonte	1975–	Lead singer of metalcore band All That Remains	
Ariel Pink	1978–	Lo-fi musician and hypnagogic pop originator	
Kaya Jones	1984–	Canadian-American pop singer	
Azealia Banks	1991–	Rapper and hip hop artist	
Lil Pump	2000–	Soundcloud rap artist	

=== Filmmakers, screenwriters, and producers ===
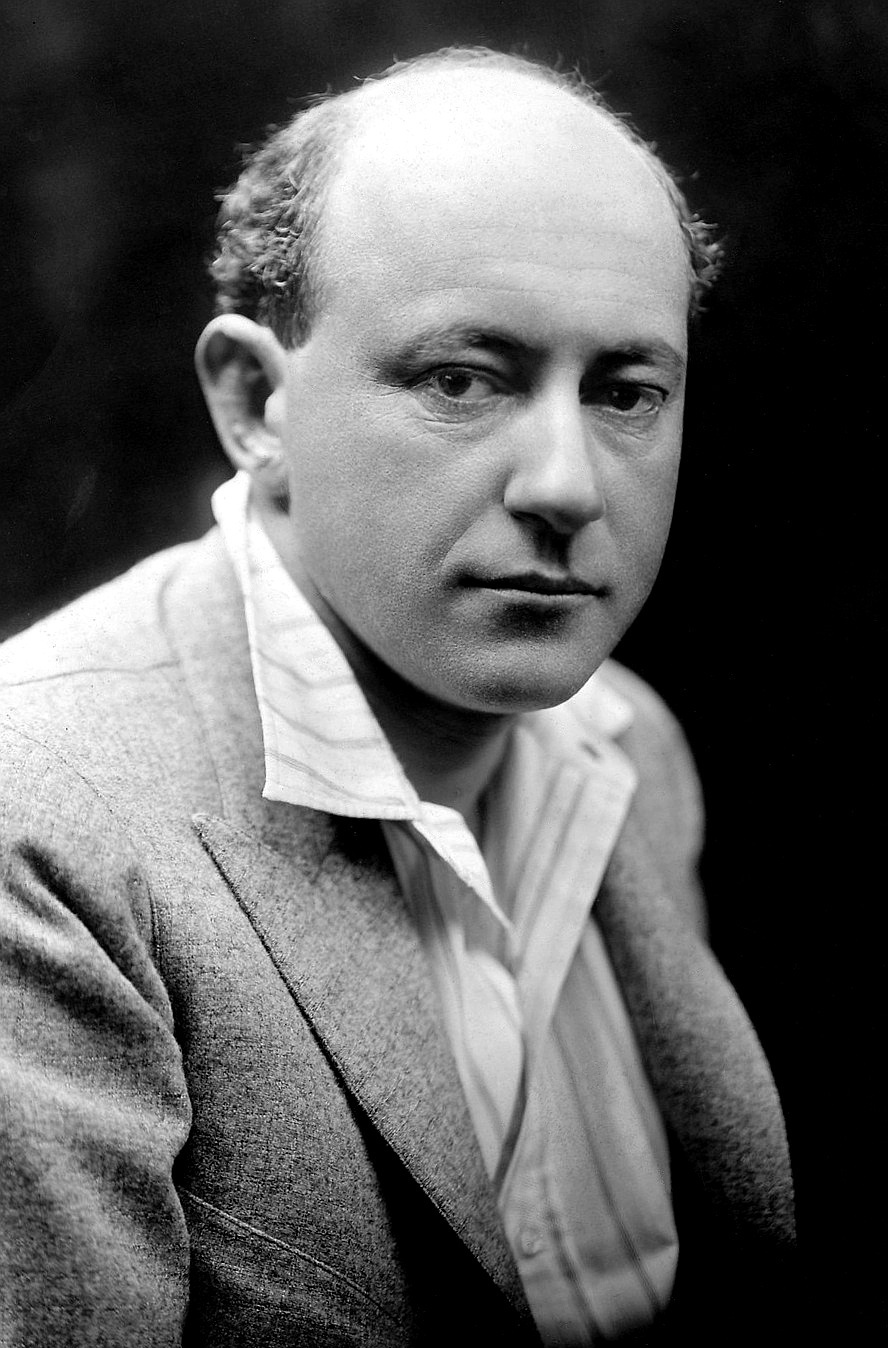
Director Cecil B. DeMille, on who actor Edward G. Robinson wrote, "No more conservative or patriarchal figure existed in Hollywood, no one more opposed to communism or any permutation or combination thereof."

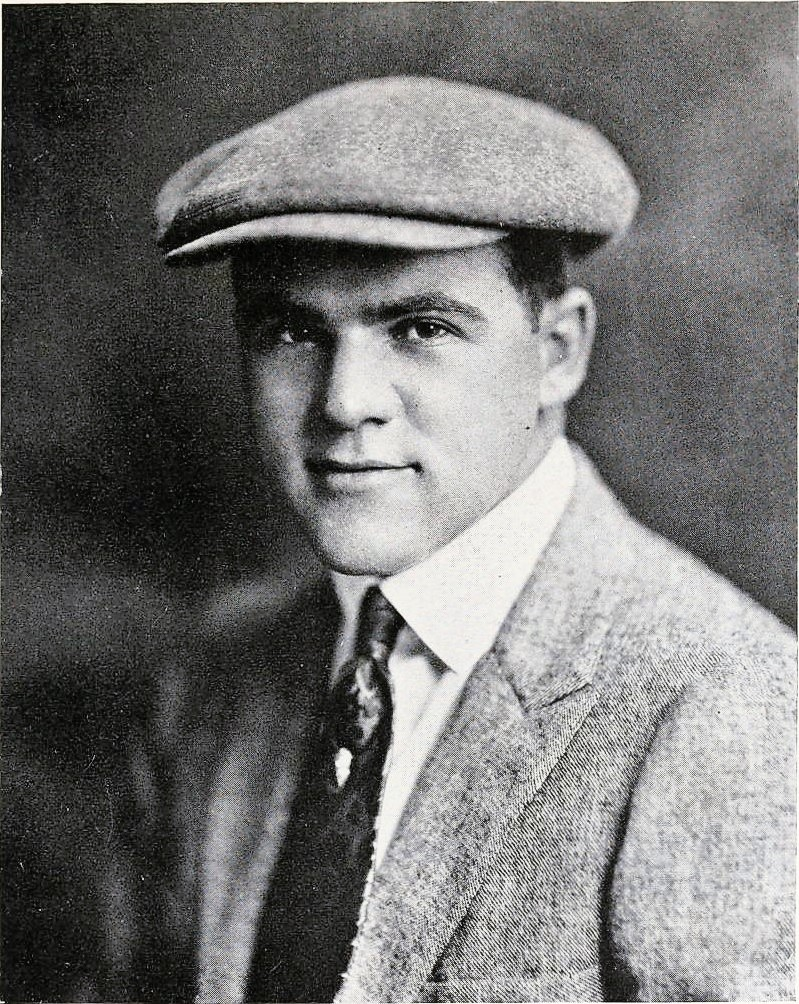
Producer Hal Roach was a member of the arch-conservative American Liberty League

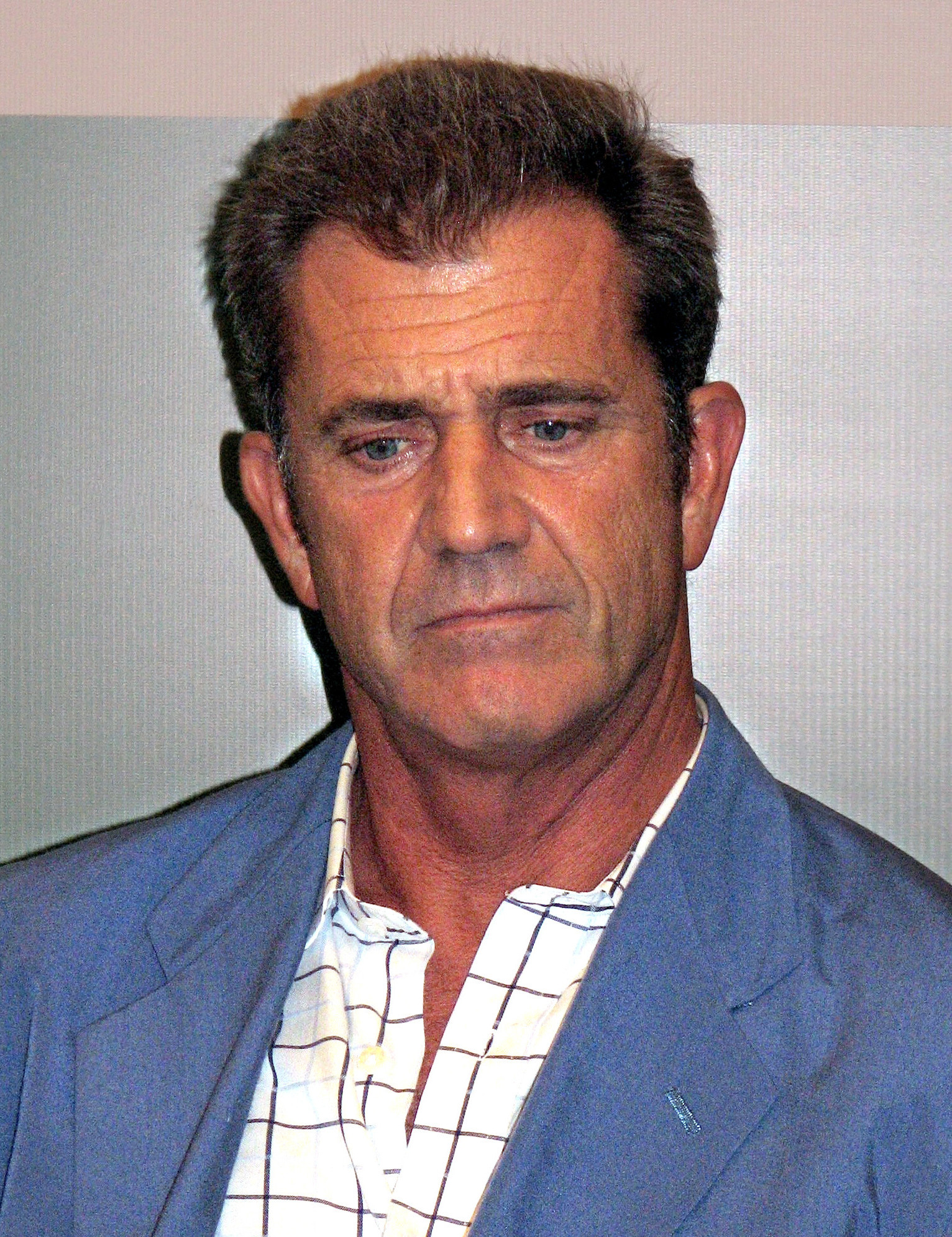
Director Mel Gibson

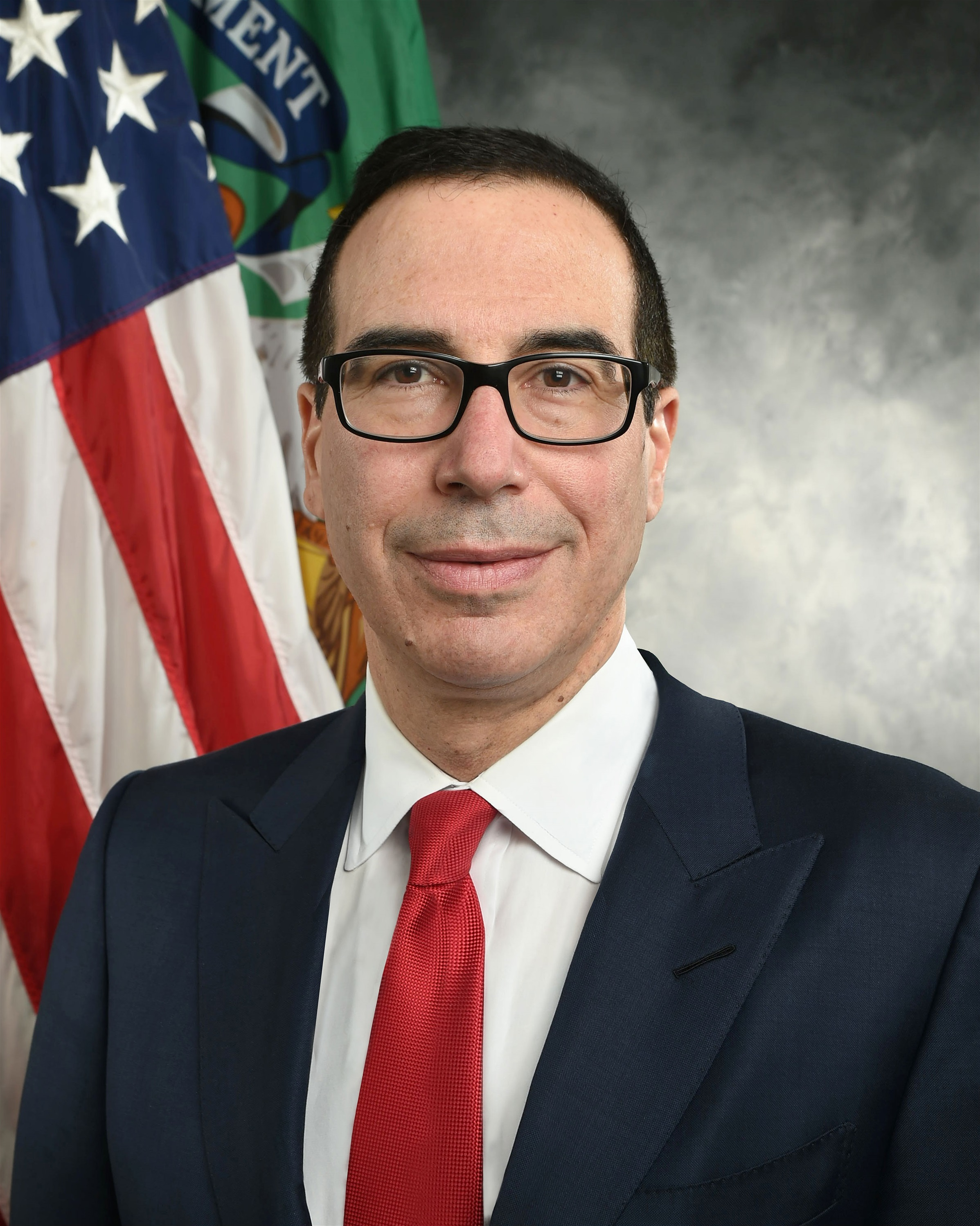
Producer Steve Mnuchin

Name	Lifetime	Notability	Ref.
Rupert Hughes	1872–1956	Director and writer of films including Gloria's Romance and Souls for Sale	
Fred Niblo	1874–1948	Director, writer and producer of films including The Red Lily, Ben-Hur: A Tale of the Christ and The Enemy	
Frank Craven	1875–1945	Writer for films including Sons of the Desert and Our Town	
Lionel Barrymore	1878–1954	Director of films including Madame X (1929), The Unholy Night, and The Rogue Song	
Cecil B. DeMille	1881–1959	Director of films including The Greatest Show on Earth and The Ten Commandments (1956)	
Donald Crisp	1882–1974	Director of films including The Navigator and Don Q, Son of Zorro	
Louis B. Mayer	1882 or 1884 or 1885–1957	Co-founder of Metro-Goldwyn-Mayer and producer of films including Ben-Hur: A Tale of the Christ and Greed (1924)	
Sam Wood	1883–1949	Director of films including A Night at the Opera and Kings Row	
Raoul Walsh	1887–1949	Director of films including The Big Trail, The Roaring Twenties and White Heat	
Victor Fleming	1888–1949	Director of films including The Wizard of Oz and Gone with the Wind	
Maxwell Anderson	1888–1959	Writer of films including All Quiet on the Western Front (1930), The Wrong Man, and Ben-Hur (1959)	
W. S. Van Dyke	1889–1943	Director of films including Tarzan the Ape Man, The Thin Man and San Francisco	
Carey Wilson	1889–1962	Writer of films including Ben-Hur (1925) and Mutiny on the Bounty and producer of films including The Postman Always Rings Twice and Green Dolphin Street	
Cedric Gibbons	1890–1960	Art director of films including The Wizard of Oz and Gaslight and designer of the Oscar statuette	
Clarence Brown	1890–1987	Director of films including Anna Karenina and The Human Comedy	
George Marshall	1891–1975	Director of films including Destry Rides Again, The Blue Dahlia and How the West Was Won	
Hal Roach	1892–1992	Producer, writer and director of films including the Laurel and Hardy franchise and Safety Last!	
Charles Brackett	1892–1969	Writer and producer of films including The Lost Weekend and Sunset Boulevard	
Harold Lloyd	1893–1971	Writer and producer of films including Safety Last!, The Kid Brother and A Girl, a Guy and a Gob	
Howard J. Green	1893–1965	Writer of films including The Kid Brother and I Am a Fugitive from a Chain Gang	
Merian C. Cooper	1893–1973	Director and producer of films including King Kong (1933) and This Is Cinerama	
James Kevin McGuinness	1894–1950	Writer of films including The Battle of Midway and Rio Grande	
John Ford	1894–1973	Director of films including The Searchers and The Man Who Shot Liberty Valance	
King Vidor	1894–1982	Director of films including Northwest Passage and Duel in the Sun	
Frank Borzage	1894–1962	Director of films including 7th Heaven	
Tay Garnett	1894–1943	Director of films including China Seas and The Postman Always Rings Twice	
James Sibley Watson	1894–1982	American experimental filmmaker and director of films including The Fall of the House of Usher	
Frank Wead	1895–1947	Writer of films including Dive Bomber and They Were Expendable	
Morrie Ryskind	1895–1985	Writer of films including A Night at the Opera and My Man Godfrey	
William A. Wellman	1896–1975	Director of films including Beau Geste and The Ox-Bow Incident	
Howard Hawks	1896–1977	Director of films including Scarface (1932), Red River (1948), The Thing from Another World, and Rio Bravo	
Walter Lang	1896–1972	Director of films including The King and I	
Myles Connolly	1897–1964	Screenwriter of films including Mr. Smith Goes to Washington and State of the Union (film)	
Frank Capra	1897–1991	Director of films including It's a Wonderful Life and Mr. Smith Goes to Washington	
Preston Sturges	1898–1959	Director and writer of films including Sullivan's Travels and The Lady Eve	
Leo McCarey	1898–1969	Director of films including Duck Soup (1933) and An Affair to Remember	
Hal B. Wallis	1898–1987	Producer of films including Casablanca, The Adventures of Robin Hood and True Grit	
Norman Taurog	1899–1981	Director and writer of films including Boys Town and the Elvis Presley Movie Franchise	
Irving Thalberg	1899–1936	Producer of films including Grand Hotel and A Night at the Opera	
James Warner Bellah	1899–1976	Writer of films including Fort Apache, She Wore a Yellow Ribbon and The Man Who Shot Liberty Valance	
Borden Chase	1900–1971	Writer of films including Red River (1948 film) and Winchester '73	
Mervyn LeRoy	1900–1987	Director and producer of films including I Am a Fugitive from a Chain Gang and The Wizard of Oz	
Mark Sandrich	1900–1945	Director and producer of films including Top Hat, Shall We Dance and So Proudly We Hail!	
Walt Disney	1901–1966	Co-founder of The Walt Disney Company, also animator and film producer, helping to create films which included Snow White and the Seven Dwarfs, Fantasia, Dumbo, Bambi, and Pinocchio (1940)	
David O. Selznick	1902–1965	Producer and executive producer of films including Gone with the Wind and Rebecca (1940)	
John Lee Mahin	1902–1984	Writer and producer of films including Captains Courageous and Heaven Knows, Mr. Allison	
Fred Niblo Jr.	1903–1973	Writer of films including The Criminal Code	
Casey Robinson	1903–1979	Writer and producer of films including Captain Blood and Now, Voyager	
Robert Montgomery	1904–1981	Director of films including Ride the Pink Horse, Once More, My Darling, and Your Witness	
Martin Berkeley	1904–1979	Writer of films including Green Grass of Wyoming and Tarantula	
Dick Powell	1904–1963	Director of films including Split Second and The Enemy Below	
David Butler	1904–1979	Director of films including Road to Morocco and Tea for Two	
George Stevens	1904–1975	Director, writer and producer of films including A Place in the Sun, Shane and Giant and The Greatest Story Ever Told	
Howard Hughes	1905–1976	Producer of films including Scarface (1932) and The Outlaw	
John Wayne	1907–1979	Director and producer of films including "Bullfighter and the Lady" and "The Alamo (1960)"	
Joseph L. Mankiewicz	1909–1993	Director and writer of films including A Letter to Three Wives and All About Eve	
Robert Arthur	1909–1986	Producer of films including Abbott and Costello Meet Frankenstein and The Big Heat	
Jack Webb	1920–1982	Creator of the Dragnet franchise	
Charlton Heston	1923–2008	Director and screenwriter of films including Antony and Cleopatra	
Sam Peckinpah	1925–1984	Director and screenwriter of films including The Wild Bunch and Straw Dogs	
Jerry Lewis	1926–2017	Director and writer of films including The Nutty Professor and The Day the Clown Cried	
Stanley Kubrick	1928–1999	Director of films including Dr. Strangelove, 2001: A Space Odyssey, and The Shining	
William Peter Blatty	1928–2017	Writer of films including The Exorcist, as well as the director and writer of The Ninth Configuration and The Exorcist III	
Roger MacBride	1929–1995	Producer of Little House on the Prairie	
James Lee Barrett	1929–1989	Writer and producer of films including The Greatest Story Ever Told, The Cheyenne Social Club and Smokey and the Bandit	
Clint Eastwood	1930–	Director of films including High Plains Drifter, Unforgiven, Mystic River, Letters from Iwo Jima, Gran Torino, American Sniper, and Richard Jewell	
Robert Duvall	1931–2026	Director of the film The Apostle and producer of films including A Family Thing, and Crazy Heart	
Stan Brakhage	1933–2003	American experimental filmmaker and writer of films including Mothlight and Dog Star Man	
Gerald R. Molen	1935–	Producer and executive producer of films including Days of Thunder, Jurassic Park, Schindler's List, Casper, and Twister	
Dennis Hopper	1936–2010	Director and writer of Easy Rider and The Last Movie	
Paul Morrissey	1938–2024	Director and writer of films including Women in Revolt, Flesh for Frankenstein, and Blood for Dracula	
Lionel Chetwynd	1940–	Director and writer of The Hanoi Hilton	
Michael Crichton	1942–2008	Writer of films including the Jurassic Park franchise	
D. Keith Mano	1942–2019	Writer for episodes on shows including Homicide: Life on the Street, L.A. Law, and St. Elsewhere	
Jerry Bruckheimer	1943–	Producer of film series including Beverly Hills Cop, Pirates of the Caribbean, and National Treasure	
Roger L. Simon	1943–	Screenwriter of films including The Big Fix and Enemies, A Love Story	
John Milius	1944–	Writer of Dirty Harry and Apocalypse Now, directed films including Conan the Barbarian (1982) and Red Dawn	
Ivan Reitman	1946–2022	Director of films including Ghostbusters, Ghostbusters II, Kindergarten Cop, and Dave	
Sylvester Stallone	1946–	Writer of films including Rocky, Rambo, and Cobra and director of films including Rocky IV and The Expendables	
David Lynch	1946–2025	Director of films including Eraserhead, Blue Velvet, The Straight Story, and Mulholland Drive	
James Woods	1947–	Producer of Cop and Another Day in Paradise; executive producer of Northfork and Oppenheimer	
David Zucker	1947–	Director and writer of Airplane! and The Naked Gun: From the Files of Police Squad!	
David Mamet	1947–	Director and writer of Heist (2001), as well as the writer of films including The Untouchables, Glengarry Glen Ross, Wag the Dog, and Hannibal (2001)	
Arnold Schwarzenegger	1947–	Producer of films including Maggie and Aftermath; executive producer of Last Action Hero, former Governor of California (2003–2011)	
John Swartzwelder	1949–	Writer and producer for The Simpsons	
John Hughes	1950–2009	Director and writer of films including Sixteen Candles, Weird Science, The Breakfast Club, Ferris Bueller's Day Off, and Planes, Trains and Automobiles	
Bob Gale	1951–	Writer and producer of films including the Back to the Future series	
Whit Stillman	1952–	Director of Metropolitan, Barcelona, and The Last Days of Disco	
Roseanne Barr	1952–	Executive producer of Roseanne	
Robert Davi	1953–	Director of The Dukes and My Son Hunter	
Gary Sinise	1955–	Director and producer of Of Mice and Men	
Morgan Mason	1955–	Executive producer of Sex, Lies, and Videotape	
Joel Surnow	1955–	Writer and producer of television shows including 24 and The Equalizer	
Zeph E. Daniel	1955?–	Writer of films including Society, Bride of Re-Animator, Silent Night, Deadly Night 4: Initiation, and Girl Next	
Mel Gibson	1956–	Director of films including Braveheart, The Passion of the Christ, and Apocalypto	
Cyrus Nowrasteh	1956–	Director of films including The Stoning of Soraya M. and Infidel	
Douglas Urbanski	1957–	Producer of Darkest Hour and Mank; executive producer of Tinker Tailor Soldier Spy, The Hitman's Bodyguard, and Slow Horses	
Daniel Knauf	1958 or 1961–	Writer and executive producer of television shows including Carnivàle, Spartacus: Blood and Sand, and The Blacklist	
Sam Raimi	1959–	Director of films including The Evil Dead and the Spider-Man trilogy	
Vincent Gallo	1962–	Director and writer of Buffalo '66 and The Brown Bunny	
Steven Mnuchin	1962–	Producer and executive producer of films including The Lego Movie, Edge of Tomorrow, American Sniper, Batman v Superman: Dawn of Justice, The Conjuring 2, and Wonder Woman	
Pat Dollard	1964–	Producer of films including Auto Focus and Julie Walking Home	
Michael J. Nelson	1964–	Writer for Mystery Science Theater 3000	
Doug TenNapel	1966–	Creator, director, and producer of Earthworm Jim and Catscratch	
Adam Sandler	1966–	Writer of films including Billy Madison and Happy Gilmore; executive producer of films including Hotel Transylvania	
Scott Cawthon	1978–	Writer of Five Nights at Freddy's	
Dallas Sonnier	1980–	Producer of films including Bone Tomahawk, Brawl in Cell Block 99, Dragged Across Concrete, and What Is a Woman?	

=== Novelists, poets, and short story writers ===
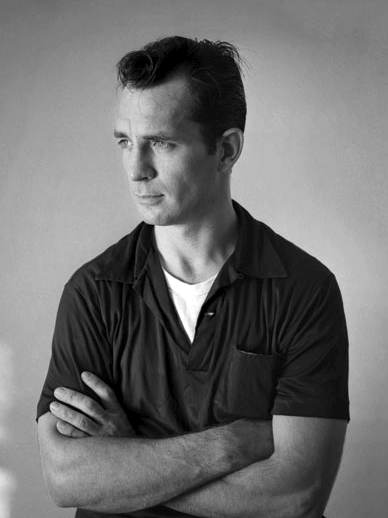
Jack Kerouac was a lifelong Republican, being quoted as saying: "My father and my mother and my sister and I have always voted Republican, always."

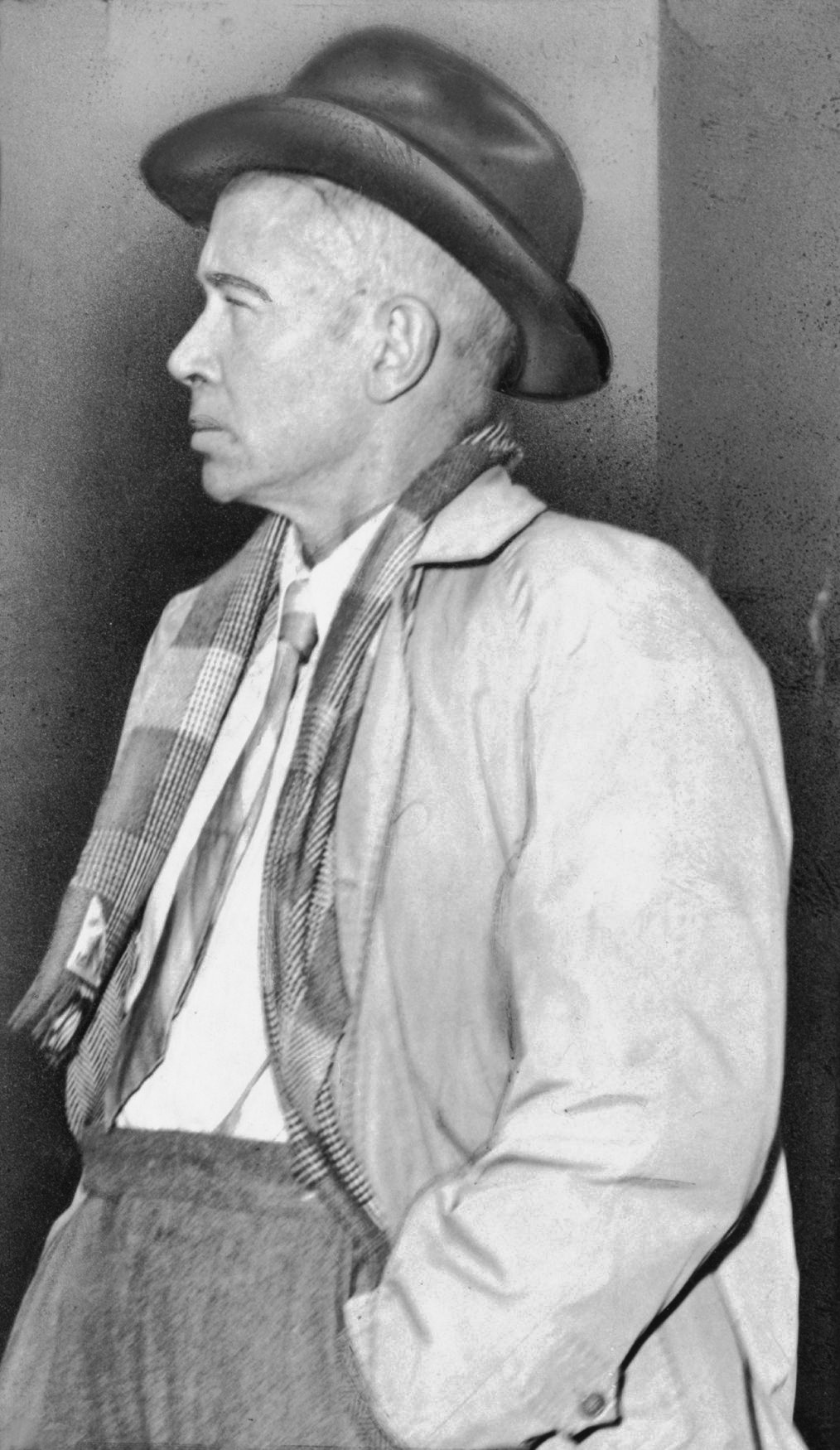
Poet E. E. Cummings was a devout Republican who supported Calvin Coolidge and later on Senator Joseph McCarthy

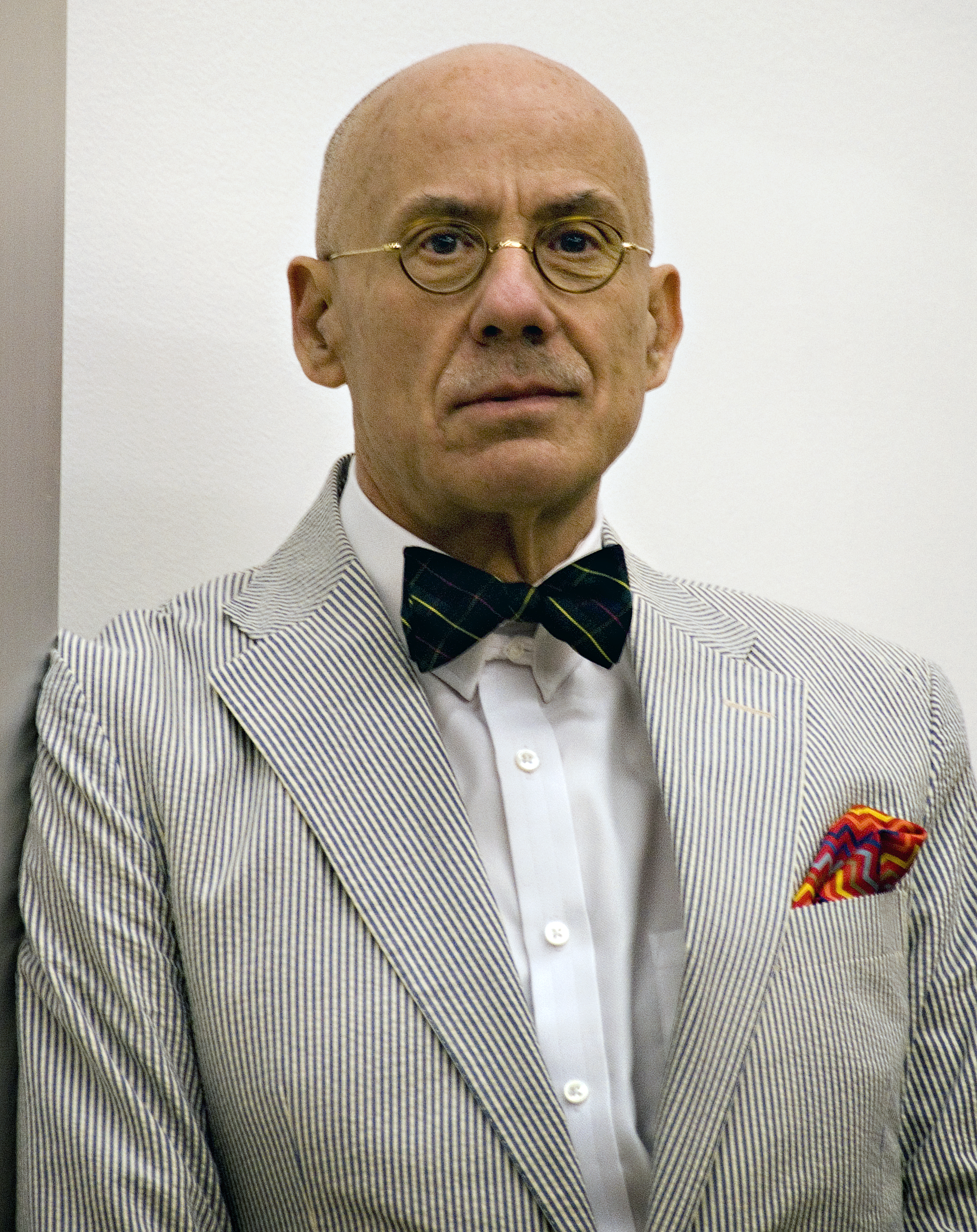
Crime fiction writer James Ellroy's works frequently touch on topics such as political corruption

Name	Lifetime	Notability	Ref.
Laura Ingalls Wilder	1867–1957	Author of Little House on the Prairie	
Grace Miller White	1868–1957	Author of Judy of Rogue's Harbor and Tess of the Storm Country	
Willa Cather	1873–1947	Pulitzer Prize author of O Pioneers! and My Ántonia	
Gertrude Stein	1874–1946	Author of The Autobiography of Alice B. Toklas	
Wallace Stevens	1879–1955	Pulitzer Prize author of Harmonium and poems including "The Idea of Order at Key West" and "Thirteen Ways of Looking at a Blackbird"	
Kathleen Norris	1880–1966	Author of My Best Girl and Passion Flower	
Clarence Budington Kelland	1881–1964	Author of Speak Easily and Scattergood Baines	
John Gould Fletcher	1886–1950	Pulitzer Prize poet of Irradiations: Sand and Spray	
Robinson Jeffers	1887–1962	Author of "Shine, Perishing Republic" and The Double Axe and Other Poems	
Marianne Moore	1887–1972	Pulitzer Prize author of O to Be a Dragon	
John Crowe Ransom	1888–1974	Author of The New Criticism and editor of The Kenyon Review	
Katherine Anne Porter	1890–1980	Pulitzer Prize author of Ship of Fools and The Collected Stories of Katherine Anne Porter	
Claude McKay	1890–1948	Author of Songs of Jamaica and Harlem Shadows	
Zora Neale Hurston	1891–1960	Author of Their Eyes Were Watching God	
Donald Davidson	1893–1968	Author of I'll Take My Stand and Singin' Billy	
E. E. Cummings	1894–1962	Author of Tulips and Chimneys and 1 × 1	
Robert Hillyer	1895–1961	Pulitzer Prize author of The Collected Verse of Robert Hillyer	
Caroline Gordon	1895–1981	Author of None Shall Look Back and The Strange Children	
Louis Bromfield	1896–1956	Pulitzer Prize author of Early Autumn	
John Dos Passos	1896–1970	Author of the U.S.A. trilogy	
William Faulkner	1897–1962	Nobel Laureate author of The Sound and the Fury, As I Lay Dying, and Absalom, Absalom!	
E. Hoffmann Price	1898–1988	Author of The Devil Wives of Li Fong	
Vladimir Nabokov	1899–1977	Author of Lolita and Pale Fire	
Allen Tate	1899–1979	Poet Laureate and author of "Ode to the Confederate Dead"	
Margaret Mitchell	19009149	Pulitzer Prize author of Gone with the Wind	
Taylor Caldwell	1900–1985	Author of Dynasty of Death and Captains and the Kings	
Andrew Nelson Lytle	1902–1995	Author of The Velvet Horn	
James Gould Cozzens	1903–1978	Pulitzer Prize author of Guard of Honor and By Love Possessed	
Isaac Bashevis Singer	1904–1991	Nobel Laureate author of Satan in Goray, The Magician of Lublin, and Shadows on the Hudson	
H. Beam Piper	1904–1964	Author of Space Viking	
Joseph Campbell	1904–1987	Author of The Hero with a Thousand Faces	
John O'Hara	1905–1970	Author of Appointment in Samarra and BUtterfield 8	
John Dickson Carr	1906–1977	Author of The Hollow Man and The Burning Court	
Robert A. Heinlein	1907–1988	Author of Starship Troopers, Stranger in a Strange Land, and The Moon Is a Harsh Mistress	
Louis L'Amour	1908–1988	Author of Shalako and The Walking Drum and Last of the Breed	
Wallace Stegner	1909–1993	Pulitzer Prize author of Angle of Repose and The Spectator Bird	
John W. Campbell	1910–1971	Editor of Analog Science Fiction and Fact and author of Who Goes There?	
Robert Lewis Taylor	1912–1998	Pulitzer Prize author of The Travels of Jaimie McPheeters	
Cordwainer Smith	1913–1966	Author of Norstrilia and The Rediscovery of Man	
William S. Burroughs	1914–1997	Author of Junkie and Naked Lunch	
R. A. Lafferty	1914–2002	Author of Paster Master and Fourth Mansions	
Saul Bellow	1915–2005	Nobel Laureate author of Seize the Day, Henderson the Rain King, Herzog, Mr. Sammler's Planet, Humboldt's Gift, and Ravelstein	
Herman Wouk	1915–2019	Pulitzer Prize author of The Caine Mutiny and The Winds of War	
Jack Vance	1916–2013	Author of Dying Earth and Emphyrio	
Walker Percy	1916–1990	Author of The Moviegoer and The Last Gentleman	
Louis Auchincloss	1917–2010	Author of The Cat and the King and Her Infinite Variety	
Edwin O'Connor	1918–1968	Pulitzer Prize author of The Last Hurrah and The Edge of Sadness	
Allen Drury	1918–1998	Pulitzer Prize author of Advise and Consent	
Mickey Spillane	1918–2006	Author of I, the Jury	
Ray Bradbury	1920–2012	Author of Fahrenheit 451, The Martian Chronicles, and The Illustrated Man	
Frank Herbert	1920–1986	Creator of the Dune universe	
James Clavell	1921–1994	Author of King Rat and Shōgun	
Patricia Highsmith	1921–1995	Author of The Talented Mr. Ripley, Strangers on a Train), and The Price of Salt	
Jack Kerouac	1922–1969	Author of On the Road and The Dharma Bums	
Bob Leman	1922–2006	Author of short stories including "Window"	
Anthony Hecht	1923–2004	Pulitzer Prize poet of A Summoning of Stones and The Hard Hours	
Norman Mailer	1923–2007	Author of The Naked and the Dead and The Executioner's Song	
Richard Hooker	1924–1997	Author of MASH: A Novel About Three Army Doctors	
Flannery O'Connor	1925–1964	Author of Wise Blood and The Violent Bear It Away	
Poul Anderson	1926–2001	Author of The Broken Sword and There Will Be Time	
Elmer Kelton	1926–2009	Author of westerns including The Time it Never Rained and The Way of the Coyote	
Guy Davenport	1927–2005	Author of Da Vinci's Bicycle and The Logia of Yeshua	
Philip K. Dick	1928–1982	Author of The Man in the High Castle, Do Androids Dream of Electric Sheep?, and Ubik	
Ira Levin	1929–2007	Author of Deathtrap, Rosemary's Baby, and The Boys from Brazil	
George Garrett	1929–2008	Poet Laureate of Virginia and author of Death of the Fox	
Tom Wolfe	1930–2018	Author of The Bonfire of the Vanities and I Am Charlotte Simmons	
Charles McCarry	1930–2019	Author of The Miernik Dossier and The Tears of Autumn	
Gene Wolfe	1931–2019	Author of The Book of the New Sun	
Clive Cussler	1931–2020	Author of the Dirk Pitt series	
John Gardner	1933–1982	Author of Grendel and The Sunlight Dialogues	
Jerry Pournelle	1933–2017	Author of The Mote in God's Eye and The Prince	
Cormac McCarthy	1933–2023	Author of Blood Meridian, No Country for Old Men, and The Road	
Joan Didion	1934–2021	Author of Slouching Towards Bethlehem, The White Album, and The Last Thing He Wanted	
Larry Niven	1938–	Author of The Mote in God's Eye and Lucifer's Hammer	
Tito Perdue	1938–	Author of Lee	
Joseph Brodsky	1940–1996	Nobel Laureate author of "Gorbunov and Gorchakov"	
Robin Cook	1940–	Author of Coma, Sphinx, and Brain	
D. Keith Mano	1942–2016	Author of Take Five	
Nelson DeMille	1943–	Author of Plum Island, The Charm School, and The Gold Coast	
Dean Koontz	1945–	Author of Odd Thomas	
Edward Cline	1946–2023	Author of Sparrowhawk	
Tom Clancy	1947–2013	Author of The Hunt for Red October, Patriot Games, and Without Remorse	
Mark Helprin	1947–	Author of Winter's Tale, A Soldier of the Great War, and Freddy and Fredericka	
Robert Jordan	1947–2007	Creator of the Wheel of Time series	
Robert Ferrigno	1947–	Author of Prayers for the Assassin	
Terry Goodkind	1948–2020	Author of The Sword of Truth and The Law of Nines	
James Ellroy	1948–	Author of The Black Dahlia and L.A. Confidential	
Dan Simmons	1948–	Author of Song of Kali and the Hyperion Cantos series	
Orson Scott Card	1951–	Author of Ender's Game and Speaker for the Dead	
Thomas Mallon	1951–	Former deputy chairman for the National Endowment for the Humanities; author of Henry and Clara and Dewey Defeats Truman	
Brad Linaweaver	1952–2019	Author of Moon of Ice and Sliders	
Andrew Klavan	1954–	Author of Empire of Lies	
Tom Kratman	1956–	Author of A Desert Called Peace and Watch on the Rhine	
Lionel Shriver	1957–	Author of We Need to Talk About Kevin	
Mark M. Goldblatt	1957–	Author of Africa Speaks and Twerp	
Robert Girardi	1961–	Author of Madeleine's Ghost and Gorgeous East	
John C. Wright	1961–	Author of The Golden Oecumene	
David Foster Wallace	1962–2008	Author of Infinite Jest and The Pale King	
Sarah A. Hoyt	1962–	Author of Darkship Thieves and Uncharted	
John Ringo	1963–	Author of the Empire of Man series	
Tony Daniel	1963–	Author of Metaplanetary	
Nicholas Sparks	1965–	Author of The Notebook and A Walk to Remember	
Joel C. Rosenberg	1967–	Author of The Ezekiel Option	
Michael Z. Williamson	1967–	Author of Freehold and Forged in Blood	
Brad Thor	1969–	Author of The Lions of Lucerne and The Last Patriot	
Travis Corcoran	1971–	Author of The Powers of the Earth	
Larry Correia	1977–	Author of Son of the Black Sword and Monster Hunter International	

=== Comic book writers and artists ===
Name	Lifetime	Notability	Ref.
Steve Ditko	1927–2018	Co-creator of Spider-Man and Doctor Strange	
Chuck Dixon	1954–	Writer for series and stories including Batman, Batman: Knightfall, and The Punisher (1987)	
Bill Willingham	1956–	Writer and artist for series including Elementals and Fables	
Scott Adams	1957–2026	Creator of Dilbert	
Ethan Van Sciver	1974–	Artist for series including The Flash: Rebirth, Green Lantern: Rebirth, and Sinestro Corps War	

== Organizations ==
=== Think tanks ===
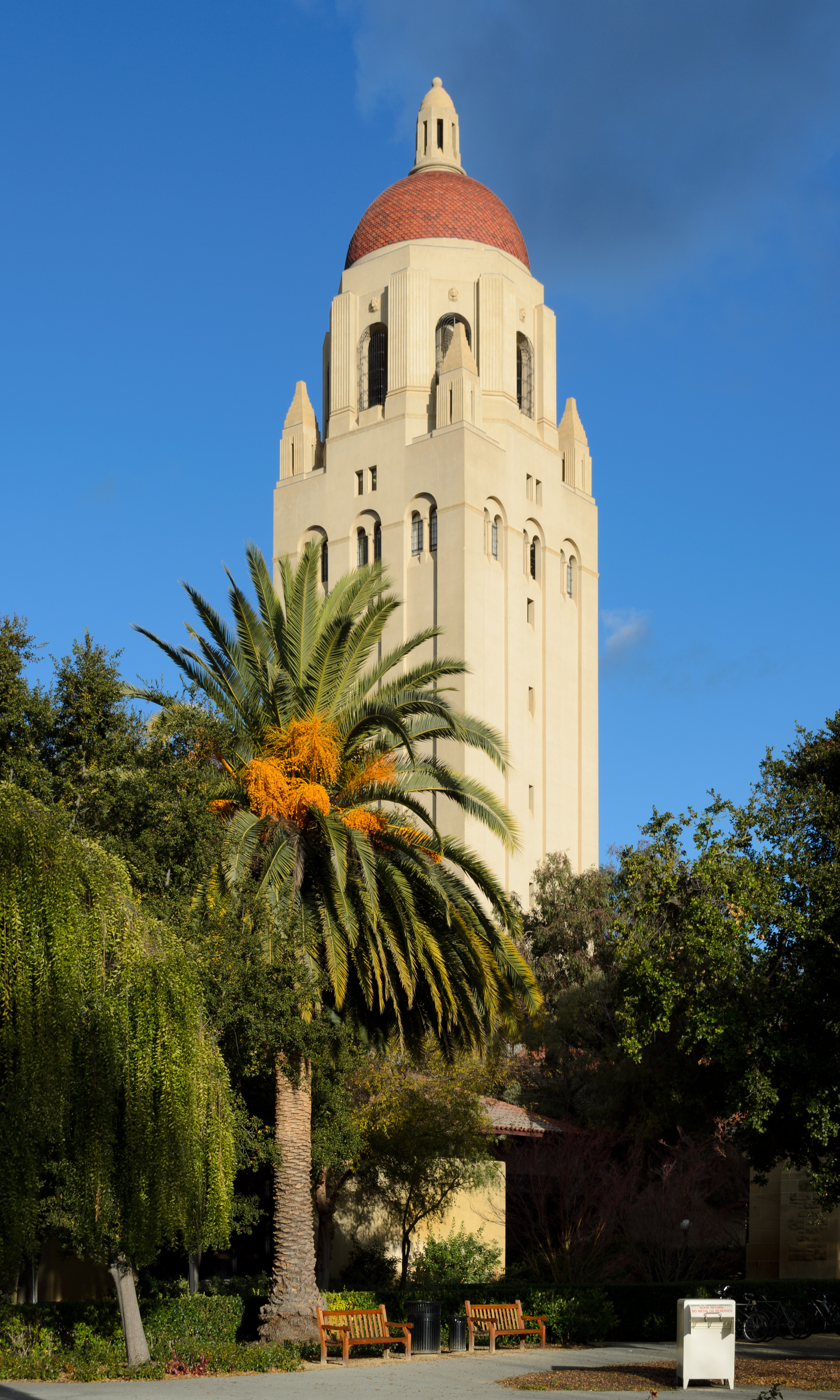
Hoover Tower at Stanford University, location of the Hoover Institution Library and Archives

Name	Founded/defunct	Notability	Ref.
Acton Institute	1990–	promotes "individual liberty ... sustained by religious principles"	
American Enterprise Institute	1938–	promotes fiscal conservatism	
Claremont Institute	1979–	promotes Straussianism	
Competitive Enterprise Institute	1984–	promotes limited government	
Discovery Institute	1990–	promotes teaching religious viewpoints in science classes	
The Heartland Institute	1984–	promotes libertarian conservatism and climate change denial	
The Heritage Foundation	1973–	promotes "[c]onservative social values"	
Hoover Institution	1919–	promotes "a free and peaceful society"	
Hudson Institute	1961–	promotes neoconservatism	
Manhattan Institute for Policy Research	1977–	promotes privatization and limited government	
Mercatus Center	1980–	promotes libertarian and free-market ideas	
Mises Institute	1982–	promotes Austrian school economics and anarcho-capitalism	

=== Foundations ===
Name	Founded/defunct	Notability	Ref.
Bradley Foundation	founded in 1942	financially supports Republican-leaning think tanks	
John Templeton Foundation	founded in 1987		
Koch family foundations	founded in 1953	gives millions of dollars to a variety of organizations	
Lovett and Ruth Peters Foundation	founded in 1994		
Mercer Family Foundation		gives millions of dollars to conservative organizations	
Olin Foundation	defunct in 2005	financially supports Republican-leaning think tanks	
Pacific Legal Foundation	Founded in 1973	Public interest law firm that defends Americans' liberties when threatened by government overreach and abuse.	
Prager University Foundation (PragerU)	2009	publishes weekly conservative videos which have garnered over 2 billion total views	
Richard and Helen DeVos Foundation	founded in 1970	gives millions of dollars to conservative organizations	
Scaife Foundations	founded in 2014	financially supports Republican-leaning think tanks	
Searle Freedom Trust	founded in 1998	financially supports Republican-leaning think tanks	
Smith Richardson Foundation	founded in 1935	financially supports Republican-leaning think tanks	

=== Political, social and economic organizations ===
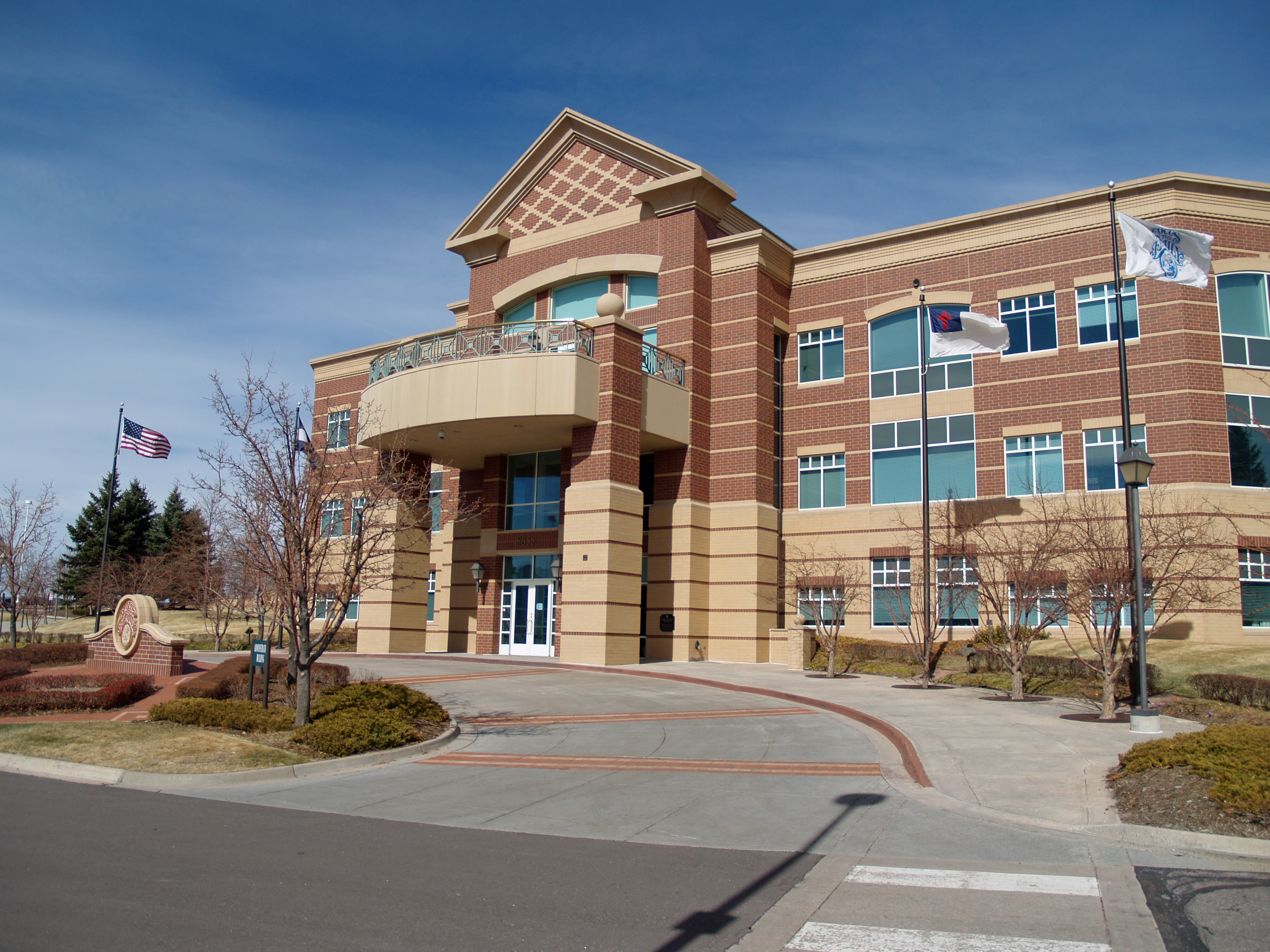
Headquarters of Focus on the Family in Colorado Springs, Colorado

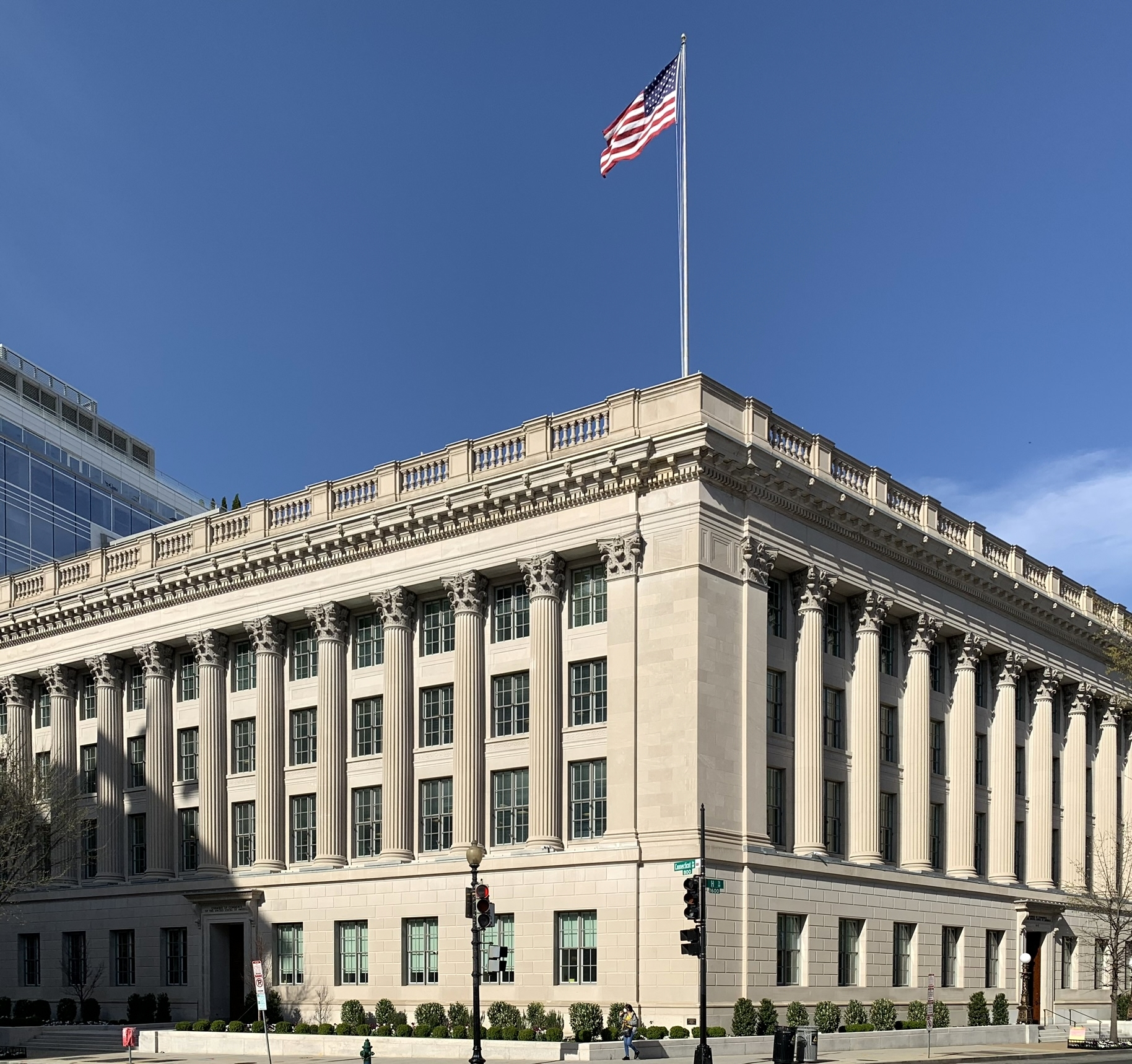
U.S. Chamber of Commerce Building in Washington, D.C.

Name	Founded/defunct	Notability	Ref.
Alliance Defending Freedom	1994–	Christian legal organization	
American Conservative Union	1964–	organization "with the aim of coordinating and guiding American conservatism"	
American Family Association	1977–	lobbying organization	
American Legislative Exchange Council	1973–	organization that helps state legislators write bills	
Americans for Prosperity	2004–	Tea Party movement organization	
Club for Growth	1999–	political action committee	
Concerned Women for America	1978–	conservative women's organization formed by Beverly LaHaye	
Council for National Policy	1981–	elite organization that meets three times a year	
Faith and Freedom Coalition	2009–	Republican fundraising organization	
Family Research Council	1983–	conservative Christian organization	
Federalist Society	1982–	legal organization	
Focus on the Family	1977–	Christian organization	
FreedomWorks	2004–2024	grassroots organization	
Independent Women's Forum	1992–	conservative women's organization	
John Birch Society	1958–	ultraconservative organization	
Judicial Watch	1994–	educational foundation	
State Policy Network	1992–	organization of state-based groups	
Turning Point Action	2019	political advocacy group	
Turning Point USA	2012–	grassroots organization based on College, High School and Church Campuses	
US Chamber of Commerce	1912–	pro-business lobbying organization	
Young Americans for Freedom	1960–	organization formed by William F. Buckley Jr.	

== Media ==
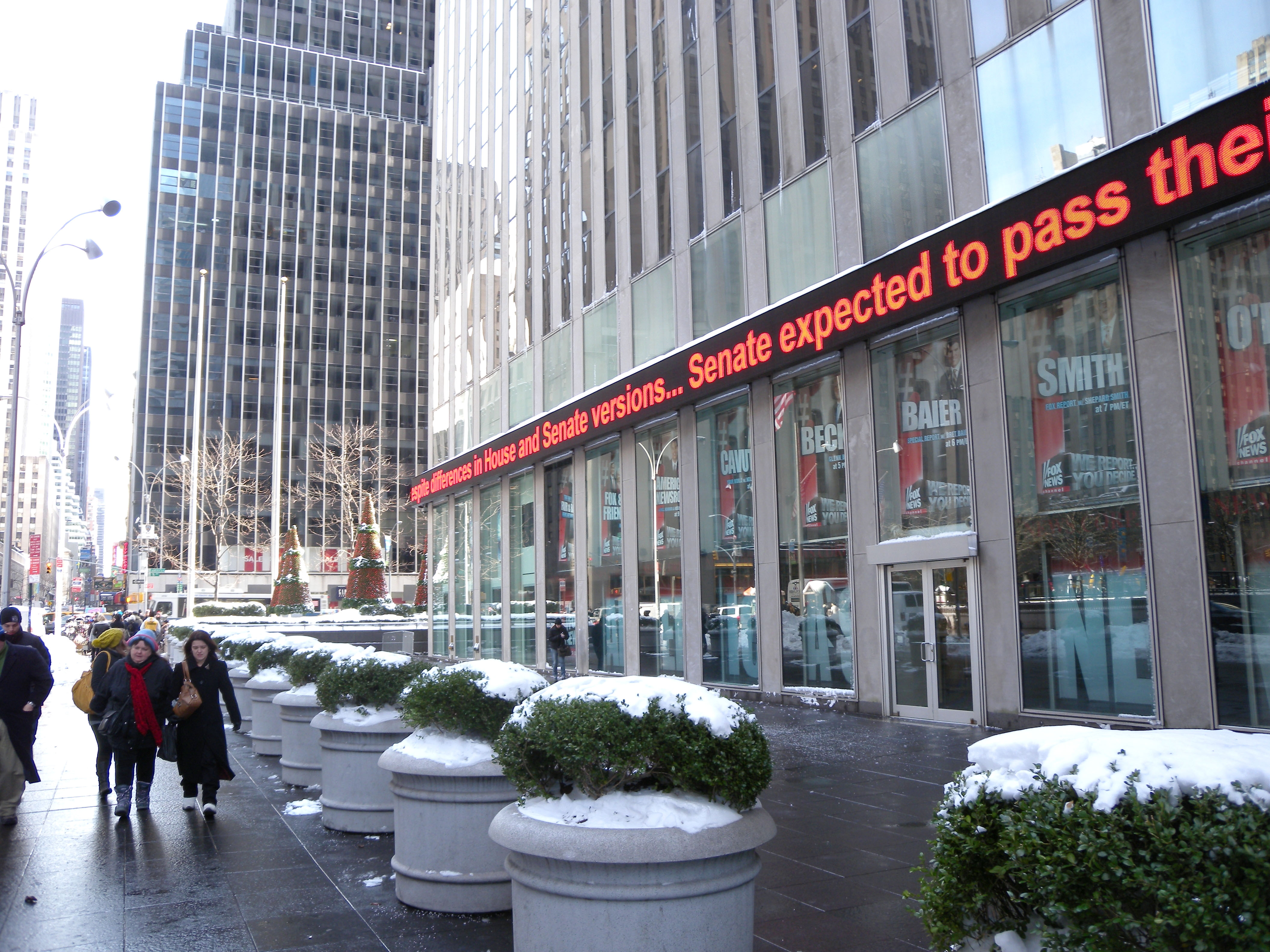
The studios of Fox News in 2009

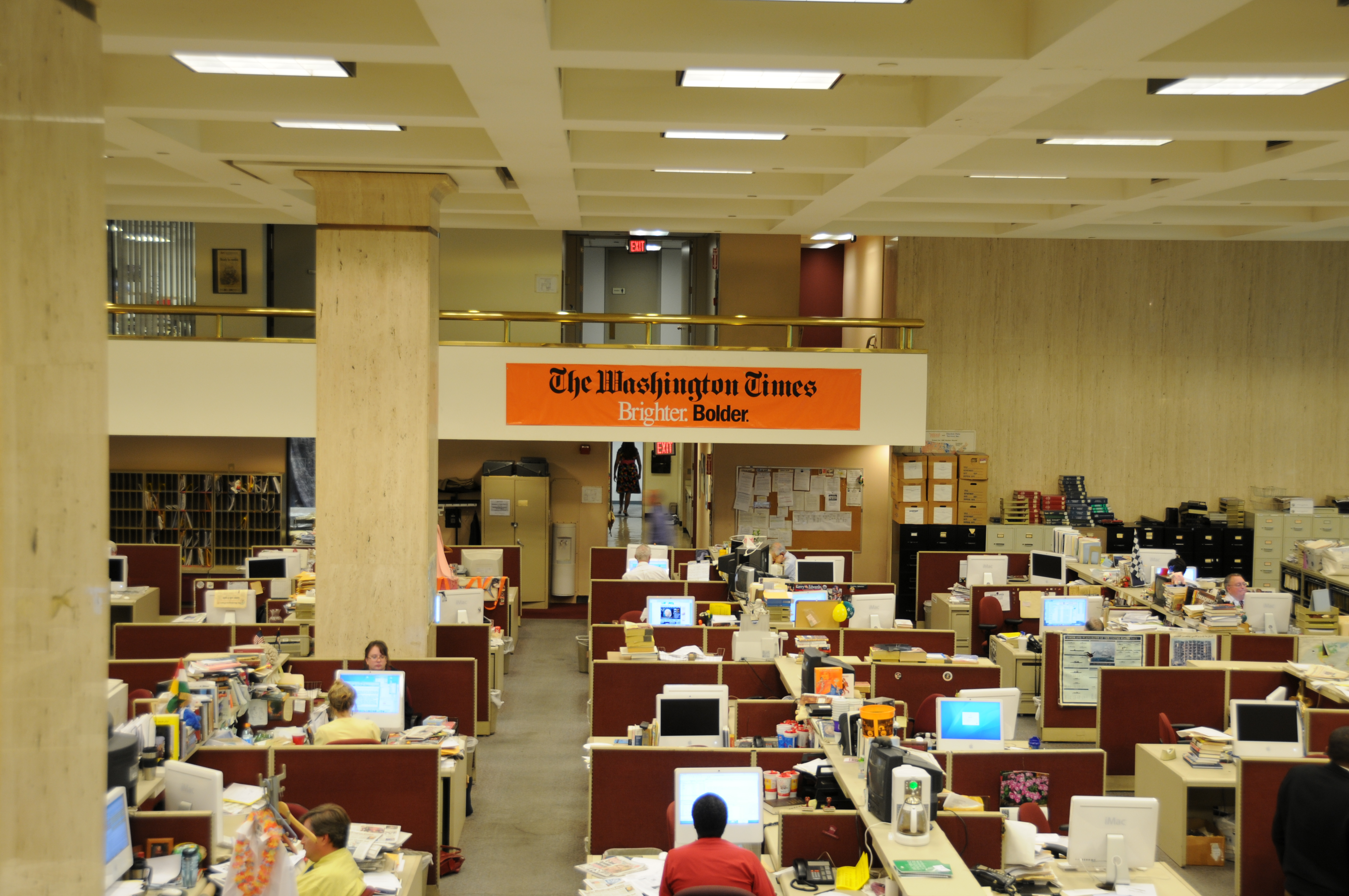
The newsroom of The Washington Times

Name	Founded/defunct	Notability	Ref.
The American Conservative	2002–	Paleoconservative magazine founded by Patrick J. Buchanan	
The American Spectator	1967–	publication known for its investigations of Bill Clinton during his presidency	
Blaze Media	2018–	news outlet from 2018 merger of Glenn Beck's TheBlaze and Mark Levin's CRTV	
Breitbart News	2007–	website formerly headed by Steve Bannon	
Chronicles		monthly magazine that promotes "Western civilization"	
CNSNews	1998–	website founded by L. Brent Bozell III	
Commentary	1945–	neoconservative monthly magazine edited by John Podhoretz	
The Daily Caller	2010–	website founded by Tucker Carlson	
The Daily Wire	2015–	website and media company founded by Ben Shapiro and Jeremy Boreing	
The Detroit News	1873–	one of the two major newspapers in the U.S. city of Detroit, Michigan	
Drudge Report	1995–	website founded by Matt Drudge	
Fox News	1996–	cable outlet	
Free Republic	1997–	website that promotes "front-line conservative activism"	
FrontPage		website edited by David Horowitz	
Human Events	1944–	weekly news magazine	
National Review	1955–	magazine founded by William F. Buckley	
New Hampshire Union Leader	1863–	daily newspaper of Manchester, New Hampshire	
New York Post	1801–	daily newspaper owned by News Corp	
Newsmax Media	1998–	media firm headed by Christopher Ruddy	
One America News Network	2013–	cable channel	
Reader's Digest	1922–	magazine founded by George and Lila Acheson Wallace	
RedState	2004–	website owned by Salem Media	
Regnery Publishing	1947–	publishing house	
Sinclair Broadcast Group	1971–	telecommunications company founded by Julian Sinclair Smith	
Townhall.com	1995–	website that hosts conservative commentary	
The Bulwark	2018–	founded by Charlie Sykes and Bill Kristol	
The Epoch Times	2000–	newspaper and news website	
The Wall Street Journal	1889–	daily newspaper owned by Rupert Murdoch	
The Washington Free Beacon	2012–	news website	
The Washington Times	1982–	daily newspaper that covers politics	
The Weekly Standard	1995–2018	weekly magazine that covered politics	
WorldNetDaily	1997–	news website	

== See also ==
- List of American liberals
- List of American libertarians
- List of British conservatives
- List of Latino Republicans
- List of African-American Republicans
- List of politicians affiliated with the Tea Party movement
- List of paleoconservative organizations
- List of anti-abortion organizations in the United States
