= Nicholas Capaldi =

Nicholas Capaldi is a professor emeritus and the Legendre-Soulé Chair in Business Ethics at Loyola University New Orleans. He was previously the McFarlin Endowed Professor of Philosophy at the University of Tulsa. He is known primarily as an eminent David Hume scholar and as an ardent defender of the Western Inheritance.

== Early life ==
Nicholas Capaldi was born on May 5, 1939, in Philadelphia, Pennsylvania. He graduated in 1960 from the University of Pennsylvania and earned his PhD in 1965 from Columbia University. Capaldi's dissertation was on Hume's Ethics in which he challenged the conventional view of Hume on the relation of facts to values.

== Career ==
From 1967 to 1991, Capaldi was a professor of philosophy at the Queens College, City University of New York. From 1979 to 1980 he was also a National Fellow at the Hoover Institution, Stanford University. Capaldi joined the University of Tulsa in the early 1990s, and eventually served as the McFarlin Endowed Professor of Philosophy and research professor of law. He is now a professor emeritus and the Legendre-Soulé Chair in Business Ethics at Loyola University New Orleans. He is also the founder of the Center for Spiritual Capital at Loyola and the Director of the National Center for Business Ethics. He has also served as the Frank W. Considine Chair in Applied Ethics at the Loyola University Chicago. He has also served as visiting professor at institutions including the National University of Singapore and the U.S. Military Academy at West Point.

External videos
- Booknotes interview with Capaldi on John Stuart Mill: A Biography, April 4, 2004, C-SPAN

Commentators have said of his work that it often brings “evolutionary account[s] into the twentieth century, exploring the ebbs and flows of the narratives beginning with the Progressive Era in the U.S.” He has also championed Hume as a revolutionary philosophical figure in the anglophone tradition. John Gray said of Capaldi's work in the area that it was “the best account so far of Hume’s moral theory, and a contribution to Hume scholarship that will not soon or easily be matched.” As regards his work on John Stuart Mill, his writing was described as filling in gaps in the history of his life, and his interaction with other figures of his day. The book has been described as supplying “rich information about Mill’s life but is also outstandingly comprehensive in recognizing the full range of his thought and in revealing the interconnection among his works”.

In 1998 his book The Enlightenment Project in the Analytic Conversation was described by Wayne Cristaudo as a “brilliant and comprehensive critique of analytic philosophy.”

== Books ==
- The Enlightenment: The Proper Study Of Mankind, An Anthology (1967)
- Clear And Present Danger: The Free Speech Controversy (1969)
- Human Knowledge (1968)
- The Art Of Deception (1971)
- David Hume: The Newtonian Philosopher (1975)
- Out of Order: Affirmative Action and the Crisis of Doctrinaire Liberalism (1985)
- Hume's Place In Moral Philosophy (1989)
- Affirmative Action: Social Justice Or Unfair Preference? (1996)
- Immigration: Debating The Issues (1997)
- The Enlightenment Project In The Analytic Conversation (1998).
- John Stuart Mill: A Biography (2003)
- Business And Religion: A Clash Of Civilizations? (2005)
- The Ashgate Research Companion To Corporate Social Responsibility (2008)
- Springer Encyclopedia of Corporate Social Responsibility (2013)
- Liberty And Equality In Political Economy: From Locke Versus Rousseau To The Present (2016)
- The Anglo-American Conception Of The Rule Of Law (2019)
