= List of paleoconservative organizations =

The following is a list of organizations with paleoconservative ideas. Paleoconservatism is a term for a conservative political philosophy found primarily in the United States stressing tradition, limited government, civil society, anti-colonialism and anti-federalism, along with religious, regional, national and Western identity.

== International ==
- World Congress of Families
- Family Watch International

== United States ==
- American Party (modern)
- American Family Association
- American Ideas Institute
  - The American Conservative, a magazine of the American Ideas Institute
- American Independent Party
- American Nationalist Union
- America First Political Action Conference
- Chronicles (magazine)
- The Conservative Caucus
- Constitution Party
- Council of Conservative Citizens
- Family Research Council
- Gun Owners of America
- Intercollegiate Studies Institute
- John Birch Society
- John Randolph Club
- Liberty Committee
- National Association for Gun Rights
- Rockford Institute
- United States Business and Industry Council
- VDARE

=== Texas ===
- Young Conservatives of Texas
- Youth for Western Civilization

== Europe ==
=== Bulgaria ===
- Revival (Bulgarian political party)
- Progressive Bulgaria

=== Belarus ===
- Belaya Rus

=== Poland ===
- Law and Justice

=== Lithuania ===
- Christian Union (Lithuania)
- Lithuanian Family Movement

=== Czech Republic ===
- ANO (political party)

=== France ===
- National Rally

=== Romania ===
- AUR Alliance (factions)
- Alliance for the Union of Romanians (factions)
- Romanian Nationhood Party (factions)

=== Russia ===
- United Russia

=== Slovakia ===
- Slovak National Party
- Slovak National Party Youth
- Republic Movement
- Direction – Social Democracy

=== Spain ===
- Vox (political party)

=== Serbia ===
- Serbian Progressive Party

=== Georgia ===
- Georgian Dream
- People's Power (Georgia)
- Alliance of Patriots of Georgia
- Georgian March
- Kobakhidze government

=== Portugal ===
- Chega
