= Ernest Fortin =

American theologian

Ernest L. Fortin, A.A. (December 17, 1923 – October 22, 2002) was a professor of theology at Boston College. While engaged in graduate studies in France, he met Allan Bloom, who introduced him to the work of Leo Strauss. Father Fortin worked at the intersection of Athens and Jerusalem.

== Early life ==
Fortin was born to a French-Canadian mother and an American father of French-Canadian stock. He was raised in Woonsocket, Rhode Island.

He attended Assumption College and Laval University, graduating from Assumption College in 1946. He had joined the Augustinians of the Assumption in 1944, and following graduation he attended the Pontifical University of Saint Thomas Aquinas, Angelicum in Rome for his theological education. He received his licentiate in 1950.

Following theological studies and ordination, he went to Paris, where he met Bloom. As he said in the Foley interview:

It was a class on Plato taught by a Dominican very well known in those days named Festugiere. It was a lousy course, quite frankly. Bloom sat next to me on my left and would make little comments to me on the text, comments which I found more interesting than Festugiere's. Those teachers, outstanding as their reputation may have been, were no great shakes.

At first I was a little bit shocked by Bloom's remarks. I had an innate reverence for famous people, and these were extremely well-known scholars, and it offended me to hear these things said about them.

He received his doctorate from the Sorbonne in 1955 and his dissertation was published (in 1959) under the title Christianisme et culture philosophique au cinquième siècle: la querelle de l'âme humaine en Occident.

== Professional affiliations ==
He returned to Assumption College to teach in 1959. Between 1959 and 1964, he was also its tennis coach. In 1962, he visited Chicago and worked with Leo Strauss for almost one year. In 1971, he moved to the department at Boston College, where he helped to found the Perspectives Program. In 1997, he retired from active teaching after having a stroke.

Fortin's personal library can be found at the Emmanuel d'Alzon Library at Assumption College. In 2006 Assumption College renamed its Foundations program "the Fortin and Gonthier Foundations of Western Civilization Program" in honor of Fr. Fortin and his Assumption colleague, Fr. Denys Gonthier.

Shortly before his death in 2002, he received the festschrift in his honor. On October 22, 2002, he sat up in bed, said "I see something beautiful," and died shortly after.

== Scholarship ==
Fortin's work in the realm of political philosophy takes place in two camps.

In one camp, he examines and wrestles with political philosophy as done within the Christian tradition. Here, he contrasts Christianity with both Judaism and Islam, for whom revelation provided a law that would provide the basis for political life.

If Augustine can be said to have any concerns for politics at all, it is not for its own sake but because of the moral problems that it poses for Christians who, as citizens, are willy-nilly caught up in it. These problems have their common root in the nature of Christianity itself, which is essentially a nonpolitical religion. Unlike Judaism and Islam, the two other great monotheistic religions of the West, it does not call for the formation of a separate community or provide a code of laws by which that community might be governed. It takes it for granted that its followers will continue to live as full-fledged citizens of the political society to which they belong and share its way of life as long as they are not forced to indulge in practices that are directly at odds with their basic beliefs, as were, for example, idolatry and emperor worship.

In the second camp he examines political philosophy in itself. In the foreword that he wrote to the first volume of his collected essays, Fortin wrote:

Political philosophy is that part of the philosophical enterprise in which philosophy comes to its own defense and, instead of taking itself for granted, makes a concerted effort to justify itself before the tribunal of the city. By situating itself within the context of human life as a whole, it discloses the full range of human possibilities and thus reveals human beings to themselves as no other science is capable of doing. In it, philosophy, politics, and theology come together to thresh out all of the fundamental problems of human life.

His work in those camps covers the history of the west, but makes significant contributions in three periods. The first period is the encounter of Christian faith with the philosophical tradition of pagan Greece and Rome. Fortin was an accomplished patristics scholar, who wrote extensively on St. Augustine. The second period is the medieval period. Fortin made particular contributions with his study of Dante. He also held the Straussian position that the doctrine of natural human rights was a distinctively modern idea, and did not have backing in classical or medieval thought. This set him against the camp that taught that the idea of natural human rights had medieval roots, most associated with the Cornell medievalist Brian Tierney and his students. Finally, the third period in which he made significant contribution was his perceptive reading, commentary and more-or-less blunt criticism of the 20th century social teaching of the Catholic Church. Here, particularly with respect to the statements of American Catholic bishops, he questioned the degree to which their statements were in conformity with the classical Christian heritage.

== Selected works by Father Fortin ==
1. Dissent and Philosophy in the Middle Ages: Dante and His Precursors (Lexington 2002).
2. With Ralph Lerner and Muhsin Mahdi, Medieval Political Philosophy: A Sourcebook (Cornell 1972).
3. Thomas Aquinas as a Political Thinker, Perspectives on Political Science (March 1997).
4. Father Fortin also wrote the Introduction to the edition of Augustine: Political Writings, translated by Michael W. Tkacz and Douglas Kries (Hackett 1993).
5. From Rerum Novarum to Centesimus Annus: Continuity or Discontinuity?, Faith & Reason (Winter 1991).
6. Reflections on the Proper Way to Read Augustine the Theologian, Augustinian Studies, Vol. 2 (1971) (review of E. TeSelle, Augustine the Theologian (Herder & Herder 1970)).
7. The Patristic Sense of Community, Augustinian Studies, Vol. 4 (1973) (review of Jeremy Duquesnoy, The Populus of Augustine and Jerome: A Study in the Patristic Sense of Community (Yale 1971)).

A number of his essays were collected in a three-volume set published by Rowman & Littlefield in 1996.

1. J. Brian Benestad, ed., The Birth of Philosophic Christianity: Studies in Early Christian and Medieval Thought (Rowman & Littlefield).
2. J. Brian Benestad, ed., Classical Christianity and the Political Order: Reflections on the Theologico-Political Problem (Rowman & Littlefield).
3. J. Brian Benestad, ed., Human Rights, Virtue, and the Common Good: Untimely Meditations on Religion and Politics (Rowman & Littlefield).
4. The project was completed in 2007, when volume 4 was published. Michael P. Foley, ed., Ever Ancient, Ever New: Ruminations on the City, the Soul, and the Church (Rowman & Littlefield).

A complete bibliography is found in Ever Ancient, Ever New, at 329-42. Another bibliography can be found on the relevant pages of Leo Strauss and His Legacy: A Bibliography, edited by John A. Murley.

== Selected works about Father Fortin ==
1. Michael P. Foley and Douglas Kries, eds., Gladly to Learn and Gladly to Teach: Essays on Religion and Political Philosophy in Honor of Ernest L. Fortin, A.A. (Lexington 2002).
2. Walter J. Nicgorski, Ernest Fortin's Teaching for Catholics (September 6, 2002).
3. Douglas Kries, What Does Ernest Fortin Have to Say to Political Philosophers? (August 26, 2002) (abstract).
4. Vincent Phillip Muñoz, Rethinking the Foundations of Religious Freedom (August 26, 2002).
5. Glenn Tinder, The Moral Amnesia of Modernity: The Scholarship of Ernest Fortin, The Review of Politics, Vol. 60, No. 2 (Spring 1998).
6. Patrick G.D. Riley, Ernest Fortin: Collected Essays, First Things (December 1997).
7. Werner J. Dannhauser, Faith and Reason: Father Ernest Fortin, 1923-2002, The Weekly Standard (November 4, 2002).
8. Fortin's death was briefly noted in Richard John Neuhaus, The Public Square, First Things (January 2003).
9. Walter Nicgorski, In Memoriam: Ernest L. Fortin, A.A., The Review of Politics, Vol. 64, No. 4 (Autumn 2002).
10. Reid Oslin, Final Tribute for a Scholar, The Boston College Chronicle (October 31, 2002).
11. Harvey C. Mansfield, The Christian Socrates, Claremont Review of Books (Fall 2003).
12. Rev. Dennis Gallagher, A.A., Fr. Ernest: A Man to Be Reckoned With, Assumption Magazine (Winter 2003).
