= Persecution and the Art of Writing =

1952 book by Leo Strauss

- First edition
- Author: Leo Strauss
- Language: English
- Genre: Essay collection
- Publisher: The Free Press
- Publication date: 1952

Persecution and the Art of Writing is a 1941 essay, later included in an anthology of the same name, by Leo Strauss.

The essay was first published in the November 1941 issue of Social Research, a journal associated with the New School for Social Research. It was subsequently included in Strauss's 1952 collection of essays, Persecution and the Art of Writing.

== Original article ==
The essay concerns styles of writing that are—in a stringently technical sense—occult. That is to say: Writing which attempt to conceal themselves from censorship and persecution during authoritarian ages and under censorious regimes. How to read these works and why it may be important to do so for the purpose of historical understanding is the theme of the Strauss's article.

The expression "writing between the lines" indicates the subject of this article. For the influence of persecution on literature is precisely that it compels all writers who hold heterodox views to develop a peculiar technique of writing, the technique which we have in mind when speaking of writing between the lines.This expression is clearly metaphoric. Any attempt to express its meaning in unmetaphoric language would lead to the discovery of a terra incognita, a field whose very dimensions are as yet unexplored and which offers ample scope for highly intriguing and even important investigations.

Strauss's primer on occult writings (in the above-mentioned sense) is at once a contribution to historiography, and a reflection with immediate contemporary relevance insofar as he wrote this work at a moment when Hitler controlled almost all of continental Western Europe. The messages coming out of territories conquered or otherwise annexed to the Third Reich in 1941 was, therefore, highly occluded. Some finesse in the art of decipherment and 'reading between the lines' would be required to understand messages and media being transmitted from public venues on the European mainland for some time to come. Strauss had been lecturing in France in 1932 and (as a Jew) decided not to return to Germany when Hitler came to power in January 1933. He escaped to the United States several years later, in 1937, accepting a guest-lecturer position at Columbia University. He had only recently been appointed to the faculty of the New School for Social Research when this article was published.

== Anthology of essays ==
An anthology published in 1952 by the Free Press, is a book of collected articles written by Leo Strauss. The book contains five previously published essays, many of which were significantly altered by Strauss from their original publication:

1. Introduction
2. Persecution and the Art of Writing
3. The Literary Character of the Guide to the Perplexed
4. The Law of Reason in the Kuzari
5. How to Study Spinoza's Theologico-Political Treatise

The general theme of the book is the relationship between politics and philosophy. The thesis of the book is that many ancient and early modern political philosophers, in order to avoid persecution, hid their most heterodox ideas within their texts. The final three essays explore the style of writing and reading introduced in the first essay.

== Overview ==
Strauss's general argument — rearticulated throughout his subsequent writings, most notably in The City and Man (1964) — is that prior to the 19th century, Western scholars commonly understood that philosophical writing is not at home in any polity, no matter how liberal. Insofar as it questions conventional wisdom, philosophy must guard itself especially against those readers who believe themselves authoritative, wise, and liberal defenders of the status quo. In questioning established opinions, or in investigating the principles of morality, pre-modern philosophers found it necessary to convey their messages obliquely. Their "art of writing" was the art of esoteric communication. This is all the more apparent in medieval times, when heterodox political thinkers wrote under the threat of the Inquisition or comparably strict tribunals.

Strauss's argument is not that medieval writers reserved one exoteric meaning for the many and an esoteric hidden meaning for the initiated few.

Explicitly following Gotthold Ephraim Lessing's lead, Strauss indicates that medieval political philosophers, no less than their ancient counterparts, carefully adapted their written words to the dominant moral views of their time, lest their writings be condemned as heretical or unjust — not by "the many" (who did not read), but by those "few" whom the many regarded as the most righteous guardians of morality: precisely those few righteous personalities would be most inclined to persecute or ostracize anyone who is in the business of exposing the "noble lie" which supports the authority of the few over the many. (cf. also Mosca's political formula) Strauss thus presents Maimonides "as a closet nonbeliever obfuscating his message for political reasons."

== Criticism ==
Strauss's ideas in Persecution and the Art of Writing sparked controversy due to differing interpretations of the exoteric-esoteric dichotomy. Despite academic debate, no widely accepted interpretation of this dichotomy has emerged. Some scholars, e.g. Lampert, Frazer and Drury believe that Strauss wrote in an esoteric manner, while, others such as Batnitzky finds this idea wrong. The lack of consensus on the exoteric-esoteric dichotomy has led to conflicting interpretations of Strauss's ideas and even his character, resulting in a dispute that can be emotionally charged. For example, some view Strauss as a fascist, while others see him as a defender of democracy.

In the essay, Persecution and the Art of Writing, Strauss posits that information needs to be kept secret from the masses by "writing between the lines". However, this seems like a false premise, as most authors Strauss refers to in his work lived in times when only the social elites were literate enough to understand works of philosophy.

== Editions ==
- Leo Strauss, Persecution and the Art of Writing. Glencoe, Ill.: The Free Press, 1952. Reissued Chicago: University of Chicago Press, 1988. ISBN 978-0-226-77711-5
