= Exegesis =

Critical investigation of a text

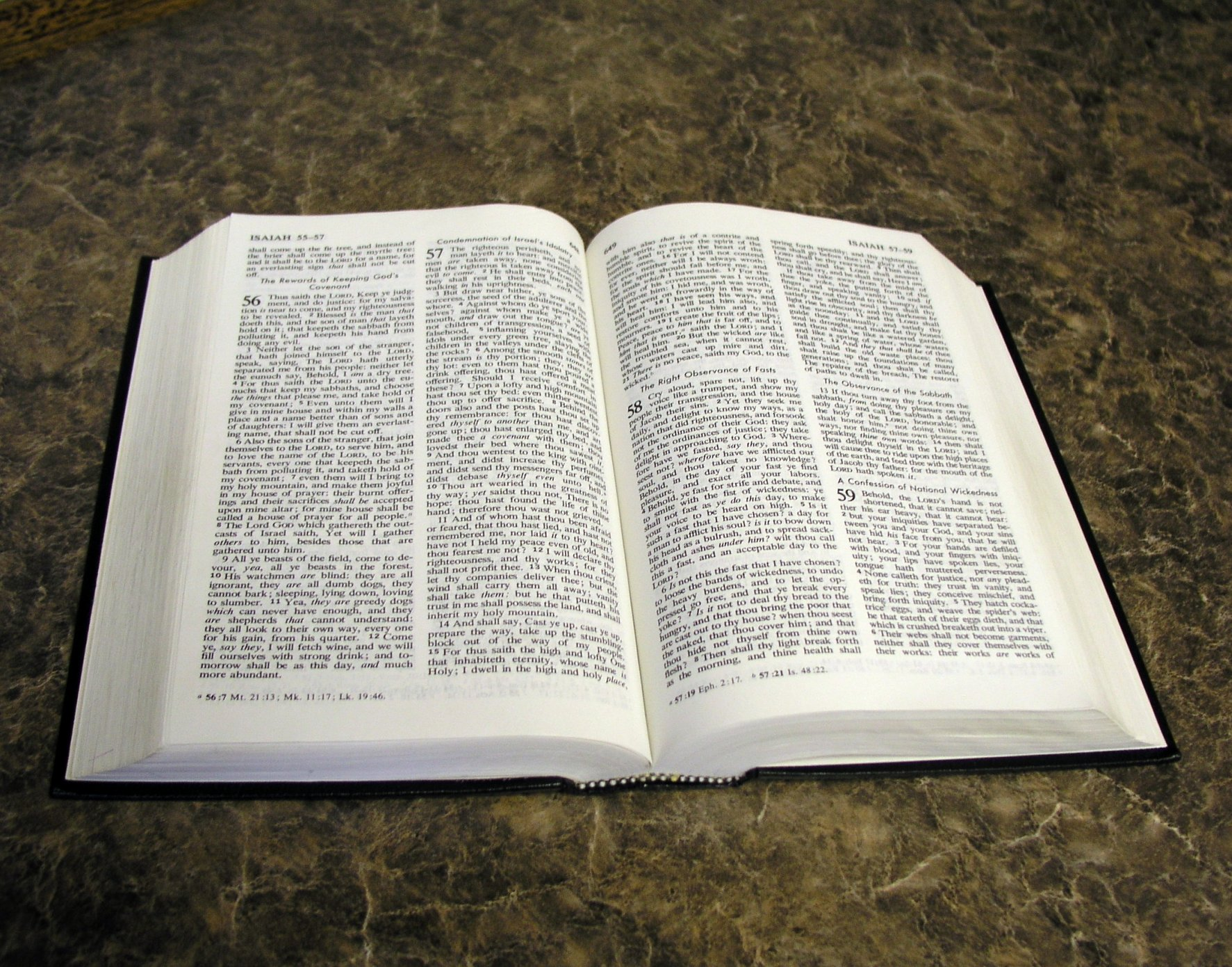
An English-language Bible open to the Book of Isaiah

Exegesis (/ˌɛksɪˈdʒiːsɪs/ EK-sih-JEE-sis; from the Greek ἐξήγησις, from ἐξηγεῖσθαι, "to lead out") is a critical explanation or interpretation of a text. The term is traditionally applied to the interpretation of Biblical works. In modern usage, exegesis can involve critical interpretations of virtually any text, including not just religious texts but also philosophy, literature, or virtually any other genre of writing. The phrase Biblical exegesis can be used to distinguish studies of the Bible from other critical textual explanations.

Textual criticism investigates the history and origins of the text, but exegesis may include the study of the historical and cultural backgrounds of the author, text, and original audience. Other analyses include classification of the type of literary genres presented in the text and analysis of grammatical and syntactical features in the text itself.

== Usage ==
One who practices exegesis is called an exegete (/ˌɛksɪˈdʒiːt/; from Greek ἐξηγητής), the plural of exegesis is exegeses (/ˌɛksɪˈdʒiːsiːz/), and adjectives are exegetic or exegetical (e.g., exegetical commentaries). In biblical exegesis, the opposite of exegesis (to draw out) is eisegesis (to draw in), in the sense of an eisegetic commentator "importing" or "drawing in" their own subjective interpretations into the text, unsupported by the text itself. Eisegesis is often used as a derogatory term.

== Mesopotamian commentaries ==
One of the early examples of exegesis, and one of the larger corpora of text commentaries from the ancient world, comes from Mesopotamia (modern-day Iraq) in the first millennium BC. Containing over 860 manuscripts, the majority of which date to 700–100 BC, these commentaries explore numerous types of texts, including literary works (such as the Babylonian Epic of Creation), medical treatises, magical texts, ancient dictionaries, and law collections (the Code of Hammurabi). Most of them, however, comment on divination treatises, in particular treatises that predict the future from the appearance and movement of celestial bodies on the one hand (Enūma Anu Enlil), and from the appearance of a sacrificed sheep's liver on the other (Bārûtu).

As with the majority of the thousands of texts from the ancient Near East that have survived to the present day, Mesopotamian text commentaries are written on clay tablets in cuneiform script. Text commentaries are written in the East Semitic language of Akkadian, but due to the influence of lexical lists written in Sumerian language on cuneiform scholarship, they often contain Sumerian words or phrases as well.

Cuneiform commentaries are important because they provide information about Mesopotamian languages and culture that are not available elsewhere in the cuneiform record. To give but one example, the pronunciation of the cryptically written name of Gilgamesh, the hero of the Epic of Gilgamesh, was discovered in a cuneiform commentary on a medical text. However, the significance of cuneiform commentaries extends beyond the light they shed on specific details of Mesopotamian civilization. They shed light on what the concerns of the Mesopotamian literate elite were when they read some of the most widely studied texts in the Mesopotamian intellectual tradition, a perspective that is important for "seeing things their way." Finally, cuneiform commentaries are also the earliest examples of textual interpretation. It has been repeatedly argued that they influenced rabbinical exegesis.

The publication and interpretation of these texts began in the mid-19th century, with the discovery of the royal Assyrian libraries at Nineveh, from which ca. 454 text commentaries have been recovered. The study of cuneiform commentaries is, however, far from complete. It is the subject of on-going research by the small, international community of scholars who specialize in the field of Assyriology.

== Commentaries on Plato ==
Commentaries on Plato include a large corpus of literature, especially in the ancient and medieval world, to explain and clarify the works of Plato. Many Platonist philosophers in the centuries following Plato sought to clarify and summarise his thoughts, but it was during the Roman era, that the Neoplatonists, in particular, wrote many commentaries on individual dialogues of Plato, many of which survive to the present day.

== Biblical commentaries ==
A common published form of biblical exegesis is known as a Bible commentary and typically takes the form of a set of books, each of which is devoted to the exposition of one or two books of the Bible. Long books or those that contain much material either for theological or historical-critical speculation, such as Genesis or Psalms, may be split over two or three volumes. Some, such as the Four Gospels, may be multiple- or single-volume, while short books such as the deuterocanonical portions of Daniel, Esther, and Jeremiah (i.e. Book of Susanna, Prayer of Azariah, Bel and the Dragon, Additions to Esther, Baruch and the Epistle of Jeremiah), or the pastoral or Johannine epistles are often condensed into one volume.

The form of each book may be identical or allow for variations in methodology among the many authors who collaborate to write a full commentary. Each book's commentary generally consists of a background and introductory section, followed by detailed commentary of the book pericope-by-pericope or verse-by-verse. Before the 20th century, a commentary would be written by a sole author, but in the recent period, a publishing board will commission a team of scholars to write a commentary, with each volume being divided out among them.

A single commentary will generally attempt to give a coherent and unified view on the Bible as a whole, for example, from a Catholic or Reformed (Calvinist) perspective, or a commentary that focuses on textual criticism or historical criticism from a secular point of view. However, each volume will inevitably lean toward the personal emphasis bias of its author, and within any commentaries there may be great variety in the depth, accuracy, and critical or theological strength of each volume.

== Christianity ==
In Christianity, biblical exegeses have relied on various doctrines.

The doctrine of four senses of Scripture is a concept used in biblical hermeneutics. In the 3rd century, the theologian Origen, a graduate of Catechetical School of Alexandria, formulated the principle of the three senses of Scripture (literal, moral and spiritual) from the Jewish method of interpretation (midrash) used by Paul of Tarsus in Epistle to the Galatians chapter 4.

The historical-grammatical method is a Christian hermeneutical method that strives to discover Biblical authors' original intended meaning in the text. It is the primary method of interpretation for many conservative Protestant exegetes who reject the historical-critical method to various degrees (from the complete rejection of historical criticism of some fundamentalist Protestants to the moderated acceptance of it in the Catholic Church since Pope Pius XII), in contrast to the overwhelming reliance on historical-critical interpretation, often to the exclusion of all other hermeneutics, in liberal Christianity.

Historical criticism, also known as the historical-critical method or as higher criticism, is a branch of literary criticism that investigates the origins of ancient texts in order to understand "the world behind the text". This is done to discover a text's primitive or original meaning in its original historical context and its literal sense.

Revealed exegesis considers that the Holy Spirit inspired the authors of the scriptural texts, and so the words of those texts convey ("reveal") a divine revelation. In this view of exegesis, the principle of sensus plenior applies—that because of its divine authorship, the Bible has a "fuller meaning" than its human authors intended or could have foreseen.

Rational exegesis bases its operation on the idea that the authors have their own inspiration (in this sense, synonymous with artistic inspiration), so their works are completely and utterly a product of the social environment and human intelligence of their authors.

=== Catholic ===
Catholic centres of biblical exegesis include:

- the École Biblique of Jerusalem founded in 1890 by the Dominican order's Marie-Joseph Lagrange. The school became embroiled in the modernist crisis, and had to curtail its New Testament activities until after Vatican II i n the 1960s.
- the Pontifical Biblical Institute of Rome, a division of the Jesuit Gregorian University, has influenced Catholic exegesis through teaching and through the Pontifical Biblical Commission.

=== Protestant ===
For more than a century, German universities such as Tübingen have had reputations as centers of exegesis; in the USA, the Divinity Schools of Chicago, Harvard and Yale became famous.

Robert A. Traina's book Methodical Bible Study is an example of Protestant Christian exegesis.

== Indian philosophy ==
The Mimamsa school of Indian philosophy, also known as Pūrva Mīmāṃsā ("prior" inquiry, also Karma-Mīmāṃsā), in contrast to Uttara Mīmāṃsā ("posterior" inquiry, also Brahma-Mīmāṃsā), is strongly concerned with textual exegesis, and consequently gave rise to the study of philology and the philosophy of language. Its notion of shabda "speech" as indivisible unity of sound and meaning (signifier and signified) is due to Bhartrhari (7th century).

== Islam ==
Tafsīr (Arabic: تفسير, tafsīr, "interpretation") is the Arabic word for exegesis, commentary or explanation of the Qur'an. It explains those aspects of the Qur’an that cannot be known by reason and logic such as the context of the revelation or abrogation of a specific ayah (verse). They are explained using reliable sources: other verses of Qur'an itself as some explain the other; the hadiths of The Prophet as the Quran was revealed on him; the narrations of the Prophet's companions as they were the main context and reason for the revelation of some specific verses of the Qur'an; and so on and so forth. Such an author of tafsīr is a mufassir ('مُفسر, mufassir, plural: مفسرون, mufassirūn). Tafsir Kabir by Imam Razi and Tafseer al-Qurʾān al-ʿAẓeem by ibn Kathir are examples of the works on tafsīr in Islam.

== Judaism ==
Traditional Jewish forms of exegesis appear throughout Rabbinic literature, which includes the Mishnah, the two Talmuds, and the Midrashic literature. Jewish exegetes have the title mefarshim (מפרשים, "commentators").

=== Midrash ===
The Midrash is a compilation of homiletic teachings or commentaries on the Tanakh (Hebrew Bible), biblical exegesis of the Torah, and texts related to the Halakha, which also forms an object of analysis. It includes teachings on the legal and ritual Halakha, the collective body of Jewish law and its exegesis, and the Aggadah, the compendium of Rabbinic homilies of the parts of the Tanakh not explicitly about the Written Law.

==== Halakha and Aggadah ====
In halakhic as well as aggadic exegesis, the expounder endeavored not so much to seek the original meaning of the text as to find authority in a Hebrew Bible passage for established concepts and ideas, rules of conduct, and teachings, for which he wished to locate a foundation. The form of Talmudical hermeneutics known as asmachta is defined as finding hints for a given law.

==== Midrashic ====
Midrashic exegesis was largely in the nature of homiletics, expounding the Bible not primarily in order to understand the documents of the past (although in some instances it is indeed the case), but to find religious edification, moral instruction, and sustenance for the thoughts and feelings of the present. The contrast between the explanation of the literal sense and the Midrash, which played off of the texts as written, was recognized by the Tannaim and Amoraim, but their idea of the literal meaning of a passage may not be allowed by more modern standards. The tanna Rabbi Ishmael ben Elisha said, rejecting an exposition of Eliezer ben Hyrcanus: "Truly, you say to Scripture, 'Be silent while I am expounding!'"

==== Tannaim ====
Tannaitic exegesis distinguishes principally between the actual deduction of a thesis from a passage as a means of proving a point and the use of such a passage as a mere mnemonic device—a distinction that was also made in a different form later in the Babylonian schools. The Babylonian Amoraim were the first to use the expression "Peshaṭ" ("simple" or face value method) to designate the primary sense, contrasting it with the "Drash", the Midrashic exegesis. These two terms later became essential features in the history of Hebrew Bible exegesis. The important principle that the Midrashic exegesis could not annul the primary sense was formulated in Babylonia. This principle subsequently became the watchword of commonsense Bible exegesis.

How little it was known or recognized may be seen from the admission of Kahana ben Tahlifa, a Babylonian amora of the fourth century, that while at 18 years of age, he had already learned the whole Mishnah, he had only heard of that principle a great many years later (Shabbat 63a). Kahana's admission is characteristic of the centuries following the final redaction of the Talmud. The primary meaning is no longer considered, but it is becoming more and more fashionable to interpret the text according to its meaning in traditional literature. The ability and even the desire for original investigation of the text succumbed to the overwhelming authority of the Midrash.

It was, therefore, providential that, just at the time when the Midrash was paramount, the close study of the text of the Hebrew Bible, at least in one direction, was pursued with rare energy and perseverance by the Masorites, who set themselves to preserving and transmitting the pronunciation and correct reading of the text.

=== Mikra ===
The Mikra, the fundamental part of the national science, was the subject of the primary instruction. It was also divided into the three groups of the books of the Hebrew Bible: the Torah, the Prophets, and the Ketuvim (Writings), respectively. The instruction in the Hebrew Bible focused on the correct division of sentences and words for better reading and comprehension. Scribes also needed to understand the Targum, the Aramaic translation, which aided immediate understanding but was shaped by the exegesis taught in schools.

The reading of the biblical text, which was combined with that of the Targum, widened the knowledge of the scholars learned in the first division of the national science. The scribes found the material for their discourses, which formed a part of the synagogue service, in the second division of the several branches of the tradition. The Aggadah, the third of these branches, was the source material for the sermon.

=== Jewish Scholasticism ===
Jewish exegesis continues beyond the Talmud into the Middle Ages, Renaissance, and today, playing a crucial role in Jewish religious life. Communities globally prioritize exegetic studies as vital for understanding scripture, using various literary tools, and engaging deeply with classical exegetical literature. Throughout history, exegetes like Saadia Gaon (The Book of Beliefs and Opinions), Solomon ibn Gabirol, and Isaac Alfasi have bridged gaps between different eras and emphasized empirical observation, logic, and divine attributes. Others, like Bahya ibn Paquda, Ibn Ezra, and Maimonides (The Guide for the Perplexed), reinterpreted virtues, developed linguistic traditions, and reconciled philosophy with religion, employing systematic reasoning. The works of these exegetes have been translated into numerous languages, ensuring their widespread influence.

== Zoroastrianism ==
Zoroastrian exegesis consists basically of the interpretation of the Avesta. However, the closest equivalent Iranian concept, zand, generally includes Pahlavi texts which were believed to derive from commentaries upon Avestan scripture, but whose extant form contains no Avestan passages. Zoroastrian exegesis differs from similar phenomena in many other religions in that it developed as part of a religious tradition which made little or no use of writing until well into the Sasanian era. This lengthy period of oral transmission has clearly helped to give the Middle Persian Zand its characteristic shape and has, in a sense, limited its scope. Although the later tradition makes a formal distinction between "Gathic" (gāhānīg), "legal" (dādīg), and perhaps "ritual" (hādag-mānsrīg) Avestan texts, there appear to be no significant differences in approach between the Pahlavi commentary on the Gathas and those on dādīg texts, such as the Vendīdād, the Hērbedestān and the Nērangestān. Since many 19th and 20th century works by Zoroastrians contain an element of exegesis, while on the other hand no exegetical literature in the strict sense of the word can be said to exist, the phenomenon of modern Zoroastrian exegesis as such will be discussed here, without detailed reference to individual texts.

== In a secular context ==
Several universities, including the Sorbonne in Paris, Leiden University, and the Université Libre de Bruxelles (Free University of Brussels), put exegesis in a secular context, next to exegesis in a religious tradition. Secular exegesis is an element of the study of religion.

At some universities in the United Kingdom, the United States, Canada, Australia, New Zealand, and Hong Kong, the exegesis forms part of the required work for fine arts doctorates, including creative-writing doctorates. A scholarly text accompanies a creative work, such as a film, novel, poetry, or other artistic output by the PhD candidate. Together, the two elements form the candidate's research thesis.

=== Straussian reading ===
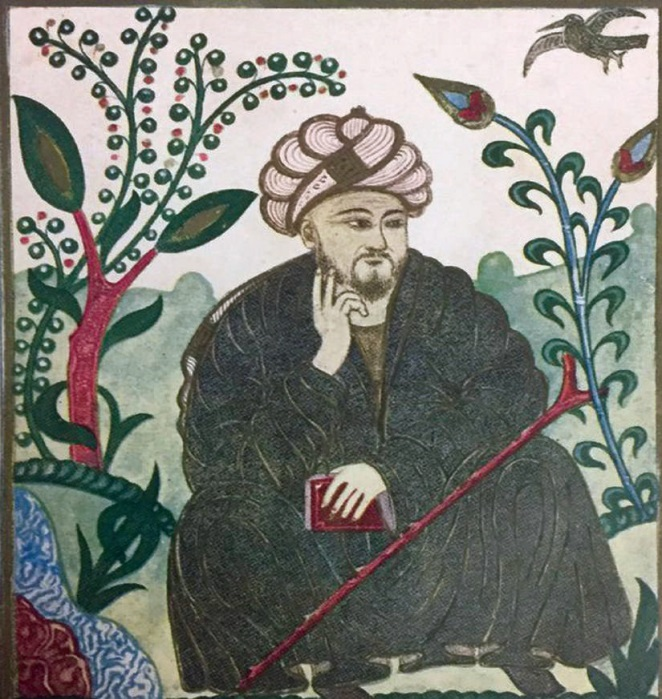
Strauss's study of philosophy and political discourses produced by the Islamic civilization—especially those of Al-Farabi (shown here) and Maimonides—was instrumental in the development of his theory of reading.

In the late 1930s, Leo Strauss called for the first time for a reconsideration of the "distinction between exoteric (or public) and esoteric (or secret) teaching." In 1952 he published Persecution and the Art of Writing, arguing that serious writers write esoterically, that is, with multiple or layered meanings, often disguised within irony or paradox, obscure references, even deliberate self-contradiction. Esoteric writing serves several purposes: protecting the philosopher from the retribution of the regime, and protecting the regime from the corrosion of philosophy; it attracts the right kind of reader and repels the wrong kind; and ferreting out the interior message is in itself an exercise of philosophic reasoning.

Taking his bearings from his study of Maimonides and Al-Farabi, and pointing further back to Plato's discussion of writing as contained in the Phaedrus, Strauss proposed that the classical and medieval art of esoteric writing is the proper medium for philosophic learning: rather than displaying philosophers' thoughts superficially, classical and medieval philosophical texts guide their readers in thinking and learning independently of imparted knowledge. Thus, Strauss agrees with the Socrates of the Phaedrus, where the Greek indicates that, insofar as writing does not respond when questioned, good writing provokes questions in the reader—questions that orient the reader towards an understanding of problems the author thought about with utmost seriousness. Strauss thus, in Persecution and the Art of Writing, presents Maimonides "as a closet nonbeliever obfuscating his message for political reasons".

Strauss's hermeneutical argument—rearticulated throughout his subsequent writings (most notably in The City and Man [1964])—is that, before the 19th century, Western scholars commonly understood that philosophical writing is not at home in any polity, no matter how liberal. Insofar as it questions conventional wisdom at its roots, philosophy must guard itself especially against those readers who believe themselves authoritative, wise, and liberal defenders of the status quo. In questioning established opinions, or in investigating the principles of morality, philosophers of old found it necessary to convey their messages in an oblique manner. Their "art of writing" was the art of esoteric communication. This was especially apparent in medieval times when heterodox political thinkers wrote under the threat of the Inquisition or comparably obtuse tribunals.

Strauss's argument is not that the medieval writers he studies reserved one exoteric meaning for the many (hoi polloi) and an esoteric, hidden one for the few (hoi oligoi), but that, through rhetorical stratagems including self-contradiction and hyperboles, these writers succeeded in conveying their proper meaning at the tacit heart of their writings—a heart or message irreducible to "the letter" or historical dimension of texts.

Explicitly following Gotthold Ephraim Lessing's lead, Strauss indicates that medieval political philosophers, no less than their ancient counterparts, carefully adapted their wording to the dominant moral views of their time, lest their writings be condemned as heretical or unjust, not by "the many" (who did not read), but by those "few" whom the many regarded as the most righteous guardians of morality. It was precisely these righteous personalities who would be most inclined to persecute/ostracize anyone who was in the business of exposing the noble or great lie upon which the authority of the few over the many stands or falls.

== See also ==
- Allegory in the Middle Ages
- Archetype
- Eisegesis
- Biblical criticism
  - Form criticism
  - Radical criticism
  - Redaction criticism
  - Source criticism
  - Tradition criticism
- Biblical literalism
- Biblical software
- Biblical studies
- Close reading
- Gloss (annotation)
- Gymnobiblism
- Hermeneutics
- Icon
- Literal and figurative language
- Narrative criticism
- Pesher
- Semiotics
- Symbol
- Typology (theology)
