= History of Political Philosophy =

1963 textbook by Leo Strauss and Joseph Cropsey

- Cover of the first edition
- Editors: Leo Strauss; Joseph Cropsey
- Language: English
- Subject: Political philosophy
- Publisher: University of Chicago Press
- Publication date: 1963
- Publication place: United States
- Media type: Print (Hardcover and Paperback)
- Pages: 980
- ISBN: 0-226-77710-3
- OCLC: 879526433
- LC Class: JA81.H58 1987

History of Political Philosophy is a textbook edited by American political philosophers Leo Strauss and Joseph Cropsey. The book is intended primarily to introduce undergraduate students of political science to political philosophy. It is currently in its third edition.

== Contributors and subjects ==
Some of the notable contributors include: Leo Strauss, Allan Bloom, Ralph Lerner, Muhsi Mahdi, James E. Holton, Joseph Cropsey, Harvey Mansfield, and Pierre Hassner. Some of the subjects in the volume include: Plato, Aristotle, Cicero, St. Augustine of Hippo, Alfarabi, Moses Maimonides, Niccolò Machiavelli, Martin Luther, Thomas Hobbes, René Descartes, John Locke, Adam Smith, Georg Wilhelm Friedrich Hegel, Alexis de Tocqueville, Karl Marx, Friedrich Nietzsche, Martin Heidegger, and Leo Strauss.
