= Shakespeare's Politics =

Book by Allan Bloom and Harry V. Jaffa

- 3rd edition cover
- Author: Allan Bloom, Harry V. Jaffa
- Publication date: 1964

Shakespeare's Politics is a 1964 book by Allan Bloom and Harry V. Jaffa, in which the authors provide an analysis of four Shakespeare plays guided by the premise that political philosophy provides a necessary perspective on the problems of Shakespeare’s heroes. Its methods and interpretations were significantly influenced by Leo Strauss, who taught Jaffa at the New School for Social Research and Bloom at the University of Chicago, and to whom the book is dedicated.

== Introduction ==
The work opens with an introductions titled "Political Philosophy and Poetry", in which Bloom posits a pessimistic diagnosis about the state of contemporary education. According to Bloom, students no longer see works of literature as directly relevant to their lives. Furthermore, nations no longer have a common author or authors whose work provides a standard education for the audience (in the way, for example, that Homer is celebrated in Greece or Johann Wolfgang von Goethe is in Germany). Shakespeare, Bloom argues, could still provide this education for English-speaking peoples on the grounds that his work is "properly read and interpreted". For Bloom, this should not follow the principles of an existing school of criticism, such as New Criticism, but rather should involve students reading Shakespeare "naively". "[O]nly when Shakespeare is taught as though he said something can he regain the influence over this generation which is so needed." Yet there is another problem within Bloom's solution: Shakespeare's plays can only really be understood as their author intended them to be if the "authentic intellectual tradition in which they were written" is recovered. For Bloom, this means knowing how Shakespeare's Renaissance audience would have understood the historical and political context of the plays' settings, as well as understanding that its conception of political life was not the bourgeois, unpoetic subject as modernity understands it, but "the stage on which the broadest, deepest, and noblest passions and virtues could be played, and [where] the political man seemed to be the most interesting theme of poetry." Because the beliefs pervasive during the Renaissance are so different from ours, Bloom's concept of naivete seems to mean open-mindedness; that modern readers who turn to Shakespeare for instruction will not automatically assume that the modern conceptions of man, the state, or poetry are inherently true. For these reasons, Bloom argues, an analytical framework grounded in political philosophy, rather than literary criticism, is the proper beginning for understanding Shakespeare's plays: as professors of political philosophy, Bloom and Jaffa would be adept at this strategy of criticism.

== Essays ==
Bloom contributes three of the four interpretive chapters of the work. In the first, "On Christian and Jew: The Merchant of Venice", Bloom first outlines how an early 17th-century audience would have thought of Venice as a successful republic that, in its success, substitutes Biblical religion for a commercial spirit as the subject of men's passions; in this way, it was a precursor to modern liberal democratic nations. He later grounds his argument on the thesis that Shylock and Antonio act as representatives of Judaism and Christianity, respectively, and that it is Shylock's absolute deference to the law that necessarily brings about his downfall. In this interpretation, Bloom illustrates the limits of law as to its ability to ultimately protect and maintain justice. Shylock's equality is in the law, but his remedy in law is tragic.

Whereas in the first essay Bloom reflects on the interfaith aspect of Venetian society, in the second, "Cosmopolitan Man and the Political Community: Othello", Bloom reflects on its interracial nature. He argues that, in seeking to be cosmopolitan, Othello necessarily could not be considered a nobleman in Venice, where, as in any political community, the "careers [of hero, statesman, or soldier] are by their nature bound to the fortunes of cities of men, all of which have special needs and traditions." From this Bloom concludes that Shakespeare uses the play to warn of the dangers of introducing foreign influences into a city. In the third essay, "The Morality of the Pagan Hero: Julius Caesar", Bloom argues that Shakespeare's Romans are authentic (in opposition to Goethe's view that they were Englishmen), and reads the play initially in contrast with Coriolanus in order to discern Caesar's populist support and godlike ambition. He then looks at Brutus's Stoicism and Cassius's Epicureanism as the motivations behind the actions of each, and concludes that Caesar is the "most complete man who ever lived [because he] combined the high-mindedness of the Stoic with the Epicurean's awareness of the low material substrate of political things."

In each of his contributions, Bloom looks for a binary or set of binaries within a play, and locates in the tension within those binaries the meaning of the entire play. Examples of this are the tension between Jew and Christian in The Merchant of Venice, between citizen and cosmopolitan man in Othello, and between Stoicism and Epicureanism in Julius Caesar. Bloom also makes philosophical extrapolations from these tensions to such an extent that his evaluations of characters no longer look like the characters themselves.

Jaffa's contribution, "The Limits of Politics: King Lear, Act I, scene i", is a thorough reading of the opening scene in which Jaffa argues that Lear's love test was not irrational or vain but rather the result of Lear's sensible and profound reflection on how best to secure stability following his succession, and that the plan necessarily fails to show the audience the limits of politics: namely, the ultimate irreconcilability of truth and justice. Jaffa also maintains that the opening of King Lear is Shakespeare's "presentation of the ultimate in human existence" as the result of a logical progression in which it is assumed that Lear is the greatest king, monarchy the greatest form of government, and that Shakespeare regarded man as a political animal.

=== Elements of literary criticism ===
Although Shakespeare's Politics is mostly argued from the perspective of political philosophy, there are many instances of analysis more typical of literary criticism that shed further light on the peculiar interpretations of the work. For example, Bloom reads Biblical allusions into the four Jewish names in Merchant of Venice, finding their origin in Genesis 10 and 11, of which the latter includes the Tower of Babel narrative, underscoring the separateness of ethnic groups which is the theme of the play. Bloom also comments in the chapter on Othello on the duke's alternating between rhyming verse and prose as a reflection of his expediency, intending to appear moral until he is no longer on show and can attend to the pressing business. Furthermore, throughout the four essays Bloom and Jaffa engage the critical literature on Shakespeare by citing several past literary analyses; however, these citations are to earlier and non-contemporary figures as the Earl of Shaftesbury, John Upton, Samuel Taylor Coleridge, and A.C. Bradley. They refer to only one critical work from the second half of the 20th century, and they use it not for its interpretation, but for the historical context it provides.

== Critical reception ==
Shakespeare's Politics was and is largely ignored by the literary establishment. Ronald Berman panned it in the Kenyon Review, taking issue with the Merchant of Venice chapter as "[having] the usual sententiousness about the problem of being Jewish...all of which was pretty well settled some 50 years ago by E.E. Stoll" and with the Othello chapter as "written in virgin ignorance of the massive scholarship." Although Bloom had written in the introduction that he and Jaffa "[respected] the competence of our colleagues in the literature departments and are aware of the contributions of recent scholarship," Berman's remarks suggest that Bloom and Jaffa were not familiar with the full breadth of scholarship, perhaps because as the departments grew as separate entities there were too many developments in the scholarship to track, and that their work might be more useful to the discipline of political philosophy than to the discipline of literature or of literary criticism. At the same time, a positive review in Harper's Magazine argues that "the notion that [Shakespeare] was...a precise and passionate thinker is vigorously defended in [Bloom and Jaffa's book]" and that Bloom's conclusions in the chapters on Othello and Julius Caesar were strikingly similar to those reached by a contemporary work on Shakespeare (The Shakespearean Imagination, by Norman Holland) that "approaches the plays... in the approved new-critical [sic] way." This contradiction among critics confirms the suggestion that the expansion of scholarship had rendered consensus unreachable. Another review notes the influence of Strauss and judges that "much depends on whether one is an admirer of [his] contribution." The lengthiest discussion of the constitutive chapters was an extended argument between Bloom and Sigurd Burckhardt in the pages of the American Political Science Review, where the chapters on Othello and King Lear had first been published.

Even with its detractors in literature departments, the book was a watershed for Straussians and those who sympathize with Strauss's insistence on understanding an author as he understands himself and on assuming that each author has a didactic purpose in his work, even if the teaching is only truly communicated "between the lines". A 1981 collection of essays on Shakespeare's "wisdom concerning political things" admits "a general sympathy with the approach developed in a work that is the nearest progenitor of this book, Shakespeare's Politics, by Allan Bloom with Harry V. Jaffa." Paul Cantor, a professor of English at the University of Virginia, has named the introduction to Shakespeare's Politics as "the classic statement of the importance of the regime in Shakespeare." Cantor's comment both affirms that Shakespeare had a purpose in carefully constructing the political setting of his plays, and suggests that only those outside the discipline of literary criticism can inform those aspects of a literary work that address supra-literary topics. From this it can be inferred that specialists outside of literary studies can enrich the scholarship on a subject as literary as Shakespeare through discipline-specific contributions.

== Other sources ==
- Akrigg, G.P.V. Review of Shakespeare's Politics, by Allan Bloom with Harry V. Jaffa. Queen's Quarterly 71 (1964): 607.
- Rubinstein, Annette T. Review of Shakespeare's Politics, by Allan Bloom with Harry V. Jaffa. Science and Society 29, no. 2 (1965): 244–46.
- Schaich, Paul. Review of Shakespeare's Politics, by Allan Bloom with Harry V. Jaffa. Review of Metaphysics 19, no. 2 (1965): 369.
