= Steven B. Smith (political scientist) =

American political scientist

Steven Benjamin Smith (born August 9, 1951) is an American political philosopher. He is the Alfred Cowles Professor of Political Science at Yale University, where he has served as the Master of Branford College (1996-2011) and the Director of the Study of Representative Institutions.

== Education and career ==
Smith was born and grew up in the South Shore neighborhood of Chicago. His father, Sherwood (Shaya) Smith and his mother Barbara Smith (née Lichten), were children of Russian and Hungarian Jewish emigres. His father was a furniture manufacturer; his mother was a ballet instructor.

Smith attended college at the University of Tennessee at Chattanooga graduating with a degree in History in 1973. He attended Durham University in England, receiving an M.Phil. in Politics in 1976, and received his Ph.D. from the University of Chicago in 1981, where he studied with Joseph Cropsey, Nathan Tarcov, and Brian Barry.

Smith was an Assistant Professor of Government at the University of Texas at Austin before receiving an appointment to the Political Science Department at Yale in 1984. He was promoted to tenure in 1990 and named to the Alfred Cowles Chair in 2001. He has served as Director of Graduate Studies, Acting Chair of Judaic Studies, and Director of Special Programs in the Humanities.

== Early work ==
Smith's early work focused on interpretive studies in the history of political philosophy, broadly influenced by the work of Leo Strauss. His first book Reading Althusser (Cornell University Press, 1984) was a study and critique of the Marxist philosopher Louis Althusser, whose theory of structural Marxism challenged the dominant school of Marxist humanism represented by Georg Lukács, Alexandre Kojève, and the Frankfurt School.

His second book, Hegel's Critique of Liberalism (University of Chicago, 1989), was an engagement with the liberalism-communitarian debate, arguing that Hegel represented both a challenge to and a reconstruction of the rights-based tradition of political liberalism. Rights were rooted not in the state of nature as Hobbes and Locke had maintained, but in the "struggle for recognition" that took place over the course of history. The book both engaged with, but also challenged, the "end of history" thesis propounded both by Kojève and in a more popular idiom by Frances Fukuyama's The End of History and the Last Man. The book was widely reviewed and praised by Newsweek columnist George Will for its "pellucid" style.

Smith's interests turned to the theme of political theology in his next book, Spinoza, Liberalism, and the Question of Jewish Identity (Yale University Press, 1997). The book presented Spinoza as an early advocate of liberalism, secularism, and the philosophy of the Enlightenment. It argued that Spinoza was the architect of modern Jewish identity with its mixture of skepticism, emancipation from tradition, and its struggle against anti-Semitism. The book received the Ralph Waldo Emerson Prize given by Phi Beta Kappa for the best work in the humanities.

This was followed by Spinoza's Book of Life: Freedom and Redemption in the "Ethics" (Yale University Press, 2003), arguing that Spinoza made freedom the central concept of his ethical philosophy. He was not simply writing a work of metaphysical philosophy but was seeking to describe the free individual who can be redeemed not through God's grace but through the use of his own powers of reason. The book argued that Spinoza's ethics was an example of philosophical compatibilism that regarded freedom determinism not as opposites but as two sides of the same coin.

The works on Spinoza were followed up with a study of the philosophy of Leo Strauss, Reading Leo Strauss: Politics, Philosophy, Judaism (University of Chicago Press, 2006). Here Smith explored the Jewish basis of Strauss' political philosophy by examining the core tension between Jerusalem and Athens. This tension between faith and reason, Smith argued, provided the lens through which Strauss interpreted the Western philosophical tradition. The book was also an engagement with the debates about neo-conservatism, arguing that Strauss would not have been a supporter of the war in Iraq or other foreign policy adventures advocated by many who invoked his name.

== Later work ==
Smith's later works began to extend beyond single author studies in order to engage wider questions of modern thought. In Political Philosophy (Yale University Press, 2012), he revised his lectures on the history of political philosophy to produce a useable introductory text on key thinkers from Plato to Tocqueville. This book put the concept of the political regime at the center of its story. The regime consists not only in the form of government, but in the wide range of habits, laws, sentiments that make a people who they are. The conflict between different regimes with different ways of life is an ineradicable part of political life.

Modernity and its Discontents (Yale University Press, 2016) explored the question "what is modernity?" by examining a range of historical, philosophical, and literary texts from Machiavelli to Saul Bellow. The book was widely reviewed and described by one reader as a work of "unapologetic humanism in the history of political thought." The book took modernity to be synonymous with the emergence of the "bourgeois" as a distinct moral and intellectual category. Debates –both pro and con – over the meaning and future of bourgeois society remain a central feature of the meaning of modernity. It is discontent with modernity that is the most characteristic feature of the modern.

Reclaiming Patriotism in an Age of Extremes (Yale University Press, 2021) took up the question "what do we owe our country?" The book argued that patriotism should be considered on a continuum between the extremes of nationalism on the right and multiculturalism on the left. Patriotism was considered as a love of country that necessarily stood in tension with other loyalties to family, friends, and religious communities. This conflict of loyalties was as old as the Western tradition, going back to Sophocles and Plato. The book attempted to develop a theory of "enlightened patriotism" that tried to capture the aspirational goals on which the American founding had been based. Patriotism was not just a matter of "my country right or wrong," but was based on a progressive ideal of what we stand for and look up to.

On Statesmanship (Yale University Press, 2026) attempts to restore the ancient question what it means to be a statesman. The statesman is not an office like a president or prime minister but is a normative conception of an ideal political leader. A true statesman is focused not on amassing power but on finding the best way to use power toward responsible ends. Above all else, Smith argues, the statesman is an educator who, through language and argument, helps shape a people's civic understanding.

== Teaching and public work ==
Smith has been a regular contributor to Yale's Directed Studies program, and teaches courses on Lincoln, Spinoza, Machiavelli, Rousseau, Montesquieu, Tocqueville, and Leo Strauss. He was awarded the Les Hixon '63 Prize for excellence in teaching in the social sciences in 2009. His introduction to political philosophy lecture course was recorded for the Yale courses online and has been viewed by thousands of people worldwide.

Smith frequently contributes to online debates about liberalism, Lincoln, and the state of current politics. His writings have appeared in the National Interest, National Affairs, the Public Seminar, the Constitutionalist, Law and Liberty, Persuasion, the Wall Street Journal, and the Atlantic.

== Personal life ==
Smith is married to Susan Jean Smith, a retired art school director. They have one son, Joshua, and two grandchildren. The couple divide their time between residences in New Haven and Brooklyn. Smith is an avid New York Yankees fan and hopes to play for the team in the next life.

== Works ==
Smith, Steven B. 1984. Reading Althusser: an essay on structural Marxism. Cornell University Press. ISBN 978-0-8014-1672-9

Smith, Steven B. 1989. Hegel’s Critique of Liberalism: Rights in Context. University of Chicago Press. ISBN 978-0-226-76349-1

Smith, Steven B. 1998. Spinoza, Liberalism, and the Question of Jewish Identity. Yale University Press. ISBN 978-0-300-14732-2

Smith, Steven B. 2003. Spinoza’s Book of Life: Freedom and Redemption in the Ethics. 1st ed. Yale University Press. https://doi.org/10.12987/9780300128499.

Smith, Steven B. 2006. Reading Leo Strauss: Politics, Philosophy, Judaism. University of Chicago Press. https://doi.org/10.7208/9780226763903.

Smith, Steven B. 2012. Political Philosophy. 1st ed. Yale University Press. https://doi.org/10.12987/9780300189131.

Lincoln, Abraham, Steven B. Smith, Danilo Petranovic, Ralph Lerner, and Benjamin A. Kleinerman. 2012. The Writings of Abraham Lincoln. 1st ed. Yale University Press. ISBN 978-1-280-88045-2

Smith, Steven B. 2016. Modernity and Its Discontents: Making and Unmaking the Bourgeois from Machiavelli to Bellow. 1st ed. Yale University Press. https://doi.org/10.12987/9780300220988.

Cherniss, Joshua L., Steven B. Smith, and Isaiah Berlin. 2018. The Cambridge Companion to Isaiah Berlin. Edited by Joshua Cherniss and Steven Smith. Cambridge University Press. https://doi.org/10.1017/9781316481448.

Smith, Steven B. 2021. Reclaiming Patriotism in an Age of Extremes. Yale University Press. https://doi.org/10.12987/9780300258707.

Smith, Steven B. 2026. On Statesmanship. Yale University Press. ISBN 978-0-300-28174-3
