= Seth Cropsey =

American political figure

Acting Assistant Secretary of Defense (Special Operations/Low-Intensity Conflict)
- In office July 13, 1989 – October 18, 1989
- President: George H. W. Bush
- Preceded by: Charles S. Whitehouse
- Succeeded by: James R. Locher

Personal details
- Parent: Joseph Cropsey (father)
- Education: St. John's College; Boston College; University of Babes-Bolyai

Military service
- Allegiance: United States
- Branch/service: United States Navy
- Years of service: 1985–2004
- Rank: Lieutenant Commander

Seth Cropsey is an American political figure and former United States Department of Defense official. He is the author of several books and studies on maritime strategy and the president of the Yorktown Institute, which describes itself as focused on "great power competition and the U.S. naval and military supremacy that must undergird American grand strategy." He is a former Lt. Commander in the U.S. Navy, where he served from 1985 to 2004.

== Early life and education ==
Seth Cropsey, born on November 3, 1958, is the son of Joseph Cropsey, a student of the political philosopher Leo Strauss and University of Chicago professor. He and his wife Mihaela have a son, Gabriel Cropsey.

Cropsey graduated from Harvard–St. George School in Chicago and St. John's College and received his M.A. from Boston College. He earned his doctorate at the University of Babes-Bolyai in Romania.

== Career ==
From 1977 to 1980, Cropsey was a reporter for Fortune magazine. In 1981, Cropsey was speechwriter and assistant to Secretary of Defense Caspar Weinberger. Between 1982 and 1984, Cropsey was Director of Policy at the Voice of America. He was Deputy Undersecretary of the Navy during the Reagan and George H. W. Bush administrations. In 1991, he was Principal Deputy Assistant Secretary of Defense for Special Operations and Low-Intensity Conflict.

Between 1994 and 1998, Cropsey was director of The Heritage Foundation's Asian Studies Center and a professor at the George C. Marshall European Center for Security Studies in Garmisch-Partenkirchen in Germany. From 1999 to 2001 he was a visiting fellow at the American Enterprise Institute.

In 2002, he worked as an advisor to Greenberg Traurig, a law and lobbying firm, but was not required to register as a lobbyist under FARA rules.

Cropsey was a signatory of the Letter to President Bush on the War on Terrorism.

On December 9, 2002, Cropsey joined the George W. Bush administration as director of the International Broadcasting Bureau.

He was written for Commentary, Foreign Affairs, Policy Review, National Review, The National Interest, The Wall Street Journal, and the inaugural Joint Force Quarterly. He is the author of Mayday: The Decline of American Naval Supremacy and of Seablindness: how political neglect is choking American seapower and what to do about it.

== Views on U.S. Foreign Policy ==
Cropsey has articulated a range of views on U.S. foreign policy that reflect his experience in international relations and the defense industry, including service as a deputy undersecretary of the Navy under Presidents Ronald Reagan and George H.W. Bush. His perspectives include the primacy of naval power, the interconnectedness of America's diplomatic approach across geopolitical spheres, and the importance of American leadership in preserving a rules-based international order and next-generation military technology.

=== Advocacy for Naval Power ===
Cropsey's views on foreign policy emphasize the importance of naval power in maintaining global stability, ensuring American security interests, countering rising maritime threats from nations like China and Russia, as well as securing vital trade routes and strategic waterways. Cropsey advocates for the expansion of the U.S. fleet and the modernization of naval capabilities to address evolving threats and challenges.

=== Perspective on China ===
Cropsey views the rise of China as a challenge to U.S. foreign policy and supports strategic response that combines military readiness, diplomatic engagement, and alliances. He has expressed concerns about China's military modernization, its assertive behavior in the South China Sea, and its broader ambitions to alter the international order. Cropsey advocates for a more assertive U.S. stance toward China, promoting freedom of navigation operations, bolstering ties with regional allies, and enhancing American military presence in the Asia-Pacific region.

=== Support for Alliances and International Engagement ===
Cropsey supports active U.S. engagement in global affairs and sees alliances, particularly NATO, as vital to confronting common threats and promoting shared interests. Cropsey has called for revitalizing traditional alliances and exploring new partnerships, emphasizing the need for a collaborative approach to address issues like terrorism, cyber threats, and nuclear proliferation.

=== Critique of Retrenchment ===
Cropsey criticized policies that may signal U.S. retrenchment or withdrawal from the world stage. He argued that such policies undermine American leadership, embolden adversaries, and create vacuums that hostile powers may fill. Cropsey advocates for a proactive and engaged U.S. foreign policy that upholds American values, supports democratic institutions, and confronts authoritarianism and aggression.

== Affiliations ==
- Yorktown Institute
- U.S. Naval Institute
- American Enterprise Institute, visiting fellow, 1998–2001
- Hudson Institute
- The Heritage Foundation

== Bibliography ==
=== Books ===
- Mayday : the decline of American naval supremacy. New York: Overlook Duckworth. 2014.
- Seablindness : how political neglect is choking American seapower and what to do about it. New York: Encounter Books. 2017.
- Breaking the New Axis: A U.S. Grand Strategy for Eurasia. Annapolis: Naval Institute Press. 2026

=== Critical studies and reviews of Cropsey's work ===
Seablindness

- Grady, John (October 2017). "[Untitled review]". Book Reviews. Naval Historical Foundation.
- Huminski, Joshua (October 2017). "[Untitled review]". Book Reviews. Diplomatic Courier.
- Sullivan, Sean (Autumn 2018). "[Untitled review]". Book Reviews. Naval War College Review. 71 (4): 150–152.

Mayday

- Holmes, James (May 2013). "[Dilemmas of the Modern Navy]". Book Reviews. The National Interest.
- Lord, Carnes (May 2014). "[Troubled Waters]". Book Reviews. Claremont Review of Books.
- Dunn, Robert F. (April 2013). "[Untitled review]". Book Reviews. The Washington Times.
- Pareek, Aditya (Spring 2021). "[Advocating Credible Naval Power]". Book Reviews. Indian Public Policy Review. 2 (4): 98–100. doi:10.55763/ippr.2021.02.04.005.
