= Muhsin Mahdi =

Iraqi-American Islamologist and Arabist (1926-2007)

Academic background
- Education: University of Chicago (PhD)
- Thesis: Ibn Khaldun's Philosophy of History (1954)
- Doctoral advisor: John U. Nef, Otto von Simson, Yves Simon
- Other advisor: Leo Strauss

Academic work
- Era: Contemporary philosophy
- Region: Islamic philosophy
- School or tradition: Chicago school (sociology)
- Institutions: Harvard University

Muḥsin Sayyid Mahdī (Arabic: محسن مهدي; cited Muhsin S. Mahdi; June 21, 1926 – July 9, 2007) was an Iraqi-American Islamologist and Arabist. He was a leading authority on Arabian history, philology, and philosophy. His best-known work was the first critical edition of the One Thousand and One Nights.

== Life ==
He was born and raised in the Shiite pilgrimage town Kerbala, Iraq. After finishing high school in Baghdad, he was awarded a government scholarship to study at the American University of Beirut, where he earned both a B.B.A. and a B.A. in philosophy. He taught for a year at the University of Baghdad before coming to the United States in 1948, where he earned an M.A. and Ph.D.(1954) at the University of Chicago. Here he studied at the Oriental Institute under Nabia Abbott and began his lifelong exploration of political philosophy under the guidance of Leo Strauss. He wrote his dissertation on Ibn Khaldun. After two more years in Baghdad, Mahdi returned to Chicago, where he taught in the Department of Near Eastern Languages and Civilizations from 1958-1969. At Harvard University (from 1969 until his retirement in 1996), as James Richard Jewett Professor of Arabic, he served as director of the Center for Middle Eastern Studies and also as Chairman of the Department of Near Eastern Languages and Civilizations.

Mahdī was versed in medieval Arabic, ancient Greek, medieval Jewish and Christian philosophy but also modern Western political philosophy. Grounded in the methods of critical editions of manuscripts developed by European scholars for the ancient and medieval texts, he tried to establish the same standards in the fields of Arabic philology and philosophy. He devoted much of his career to searching for manuscripts wherever his travels took him. He is especially known for the recovery, edition, translation and interpretation of many of the works of Alfarabi. With Ralph Lerner at Chicago and Ernest Fortin at Boston College, he co-edited Medieval Political Philosophy, a path-breaking sourcebook that includes selections in translation from Arabic, Hebrew and Latin texts.

== Bibliography ==
=== English ===
- Ibn Khaldun's Philosophy of History: A Study in the Philosophical Foundation of the Science of Culture. His doctoral dissertation of 1954, published 1957.
- The Thousand and One Nights (Alf layla wa-layla), from the Earliest Known Sources, ed. by Muhsin Mahdi, 3 vols (Leiden: Brill, 1984-1994). ISBN 9004074287.
- NB The Arabian Nights: based on the text of the fourteenth-century manuscript ed. by Muhsin Mahdi. Translated by Husain Haddawy. Everyman's Library, 1992.
- Alfarabi and the Foundation of Islamic Political Philosophy. 2001.

=== French ===
- "La fondation de la philosophie politique en islam. La cité vertueuse d'Alfarabi." Champs. Flammarion. Paris. 2000.
