= Eve Adler =

American classics professor, linguist, and translator (1945-2004)

Eve Adler (29 April 1945 – 4 September 2004) was an American classicist who taught at Middlebury College for 25 years until her death in 2004. Adler was a graduate of Queens College with a B.A. in Hebrew, of Brandeis University with a M.A. in Mediterranean Studies and of Cornell University, where she got her doctorate in Classics. She was widely regarded as one of the most gifted teachers in Middlebury's history.

== Life and career ==
Adler primarily specialized in ancient epic poetry, particularly Homer and Vergil, as well as classical understanding of liberal education. Prior to her death, she published her monumental and authoritative work called "Vergil's Empire: Political Thought in the Aeneid" (Rowman & Littlefield, 2003). In this book, Adler rejects centuries of scholarship on Vergil, which believes that he was merely a clever imitator of Homer, and argues that he had a unique view of the human condition and ambitions as great, if not greater, than his Greek predecessor. As the Weekly Standard wrote in its review of the book, Adler believes "something of a secret teaching may be glimpsed behind the imperial screen ... [Secret teaching of] views on universal empire [that have] urgency not only for literary studies but for our reflections on empire in the current global situation." In addition to her book on Vergil, Adler had written an earlier work on Catullan self-Revelation and numerous scholarly articles on other classical authors.

Adler was also an important scholar of political philosophy in general, and extensively studied the political thought and approach to Scholarly method advocated by Leo Strauss, and was widely regarded as one of the leading Straussians even though she had never studied with him. She was the translator from German of Strauss's "Philosophy and Law: Contributions to the Understanding of Maimonides and His Predecessors" (Albany: SUNY Press, 1995). Her introduction to that work is one of the most authoritative interpretation of Strauss's work on Maimonides.

In the 1990s, Adler developed an interest in Russian thought and literature. She not only taught herself Russian language, but also co-authored, with Vladimir Shlyakhov, "A Dictionary of Russian Slang and Colloquial Expressions" (Barrons, 1995). She also translated Mikhail Epstein's "Cries in the New Wilderness" from Russian. She spent the last years of her life preparing a Russian translation of Strauss' Natural Right and History. This translation was published after her death in Russia (Moscow: Vodoley Publishers, 2007, see lstrauss.ru).

Adler taught Greek, Latin, and Hebrew at Middlebury College, and also knew German, Russian, Arabic, and Italian.
