= Thoughts on Machiavelli =

1958 book by Leo Strauss

- Author: Leo Strauss
- Publication date: 1958

Thoughts on Machiavelli is a book by Leo Strauss first published in 1958. The book is a collection of lectures he gave at the University of Chicago in which he dissects the work of Niccolò Machiavelli. The book contains commentary on Machiavelli's The Prince and the Discourses on Livy.

Leo Strauss argued that the most visible fact about Machiavelli's doctrine is also the most useful one: Machiavelli seems to be a teacher of wickedness. Strauss sought to incorporate this idea in his interpretation without permitting it to overwhelm or exhaust his exegesis of The Prince and the Discourses on the First Ten Books of Livy.

"We are in sympathy," he writes, "with the simple opinion about Machiavelli [namely, the wickedness of his teaching], not only because it is wholesome, but above all because a failure to take that opinion seriously prevents one from doing justice to what is truly admirable in Machiavelli: the intrepidity of his thought, the grandeur of his vision, and the graceful subtlety of his speech."
