= Christopher Bruell =

American philosopher (1942–2024)

- Born: December 11, 1942
- Died: November 6, 2024 (aged 81)

Education
- Education: University of Chicago (PhD), Cornell University (BA)
- Thesis: Xenophon's Education of Cyrus (1969)
- Doctoral advisor: Leo Strauss

Philosophical work
- Era: 21st-century philosophy
- Region: Western philosophy
- Institutions: Boston College
- Main interests: ancient Greek philosophy, political philosophy

Christopher Bruell (December 11, 1942 – November 6, 2024) was an American philosopher who was emeritus Professor of Political Science at Boston College. He is known for his works on ancient Greek philosophy. Bruell died after a long illness at home, on November 6, 2024, at the age of 81.

== Books ==
- On The Socratic Education, An Introduction to the Shorter Platonic Dialogues, Rowman & Littlefield, 1999
- Aristotle as Teacher: His Introduction to a Philosophical Science, St. Augustine's Press, 2014
- Christopher Bruell: Essays of Five Decades on Philosophy and Philosophers, State University of New York Press, 2025
