= Allan Bloom =

American philosopher, classicist, and academician (1930–1992)

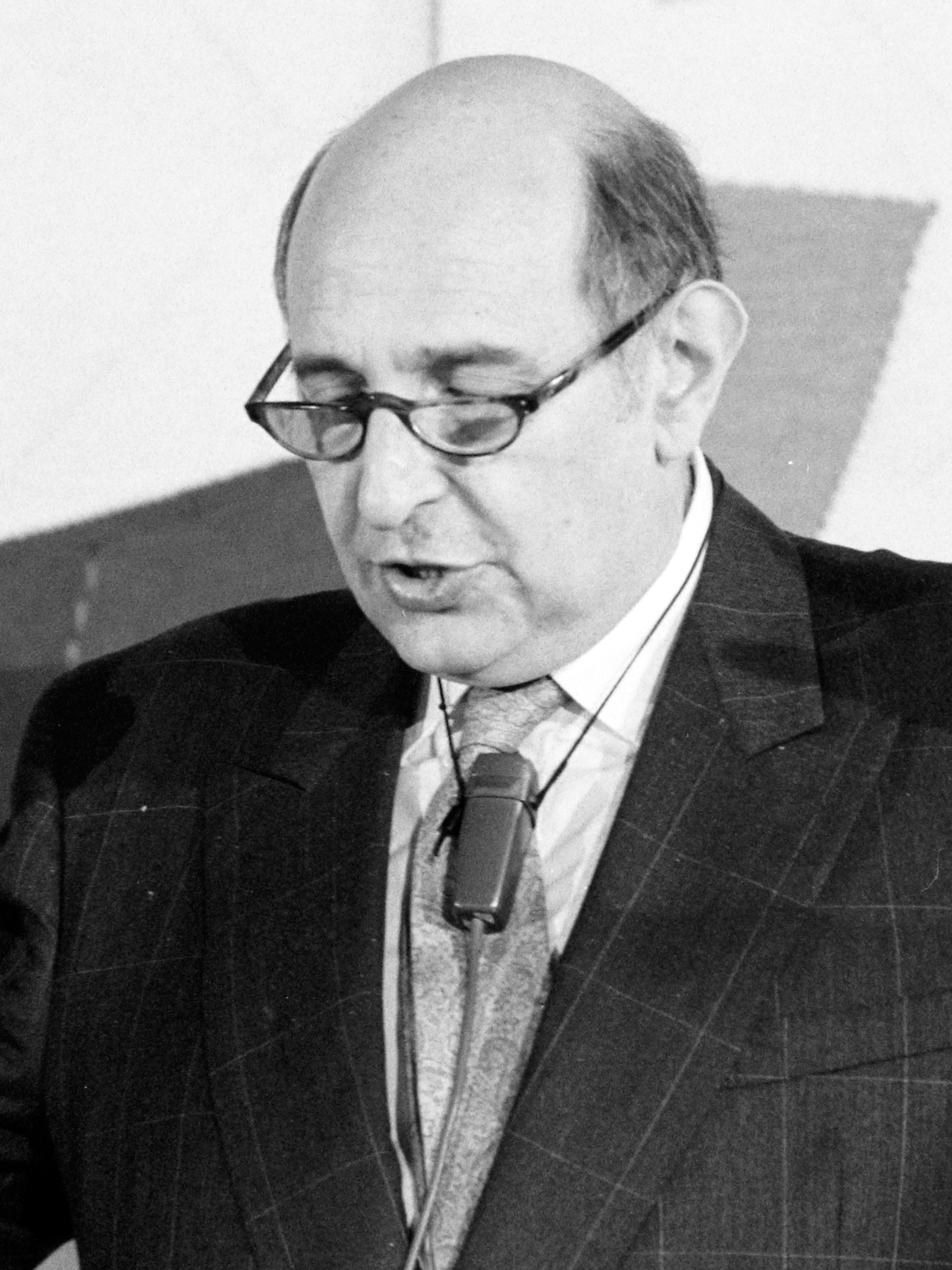
- Bloom in 1989
- Born: Allan David Bloom; September 14, 1930; Indianapolis, Indiana, U.S.
- Died: October 7, 1992 (aged 62); Chicago, Illinois, U.S.

Education
- Education: University of Chicago (BA, PhD)
- Thesis: The Political Philosophy of Isocrates (1955)
- Doctoral advisor: Leo Strauss
- Other advisor: Alexandre Kojève

Philosophical work
- Era: 20th-century philosophy
- Region: Western philosophy
- School: Continental philosophy
- Institutions: École Normale Supérieure
- Main interests: Greek philosophy, history of philosophy, political philosophy, Renaissance philosophy, nihilism, French literature, Shakespeare
- Notable works: The Closing of the American Mind (1987)
- Notable ideas: The claim that the apparent openness of relativism paradoxically results in intellectual closing

Allan David Bloom (September 14, 1930 – October 7, 1992) was an American philosopher, classicist, and academician. He studied under David Grene, Leo Strauss, Richard McKeon, and Alexandre Kojève. He subsequently taught at Cornell University, the University of Toronto, Tel Aviv University, Yale University, the École Normale Supérieure, and the University of Chicago.

Bloom championed the idea of Great Books education and became famous for his criticism of contemporary American higher education, expressing his views in his bestselling 1987 book, The Closing of the American Mind. Characterized as a conservative in the popular media, Bloom denied the label, asserting that what he sought to defend was the "theoretical life". Saul Bellow wrote Ravelstein, a roman à clef based on Bloom, his friend and colleague at the University of Chicago.

== Early life and education ==
Bloom was born in Indianapolis, Indiana, to second-generation Jewish parents who were both social workers. The couple had a daughter, Lucille, two years earlier. As a thirteen-year-old, Bloom read a Reader's Digest article about the University of Chicago and told his parents he wanted to attend; his parents thought it was unreasonable and did not encourage his hopes. Yet, when his family moved to Chicago in 1944, his parents met a psychiatrist and family friend whose son was enrolled in the University of Chicago's humanities program for gifted students. In 1946, Bloom was accepted to the same program, starting his degree at the age of fifteen, and spending the next decade of his life enrolled at the university in Chicago's Hyde Park neighborhood. This began his lifelong passion for the 'idea' of the university.

In the preface to Giants and Dwarfs: Essays, 1960–1990, he stated that his education "began with Freud and ended with Plato". The theme of this education was self-knowledge, or self-discovery—an idea that Bloom would later write seemed impossible to conceive of for a Midwestern American boy. He credits Leo Strauss as the teacher who made this endeavor possible for him.

Bloom graduated from the University of Chicago with a bachelor's degree at the age of 18. Some of his notable college classmates included Seth Benardete, Richard Rorty, and Stanley Rosen. For postgraduate studies, he enrolled in the University of Chicago's Committee on Social Thought, where he was assigned classicist David Grene as tutor. Bloom went on to write his thesis on Isocrates. Grene recalled Bloom as an energetic and humorous student completely dedicated to studying classics, but with no definite career ambitions. The committee was a unique interdisciplinary program that attracted a small number of students due to its rigorous academic requirements and lack of clear employment opportunities after graduation. Bloom earned his Ph.D. from the Committee on Social Thought in 1955. He subsequently studied under the influential Hegelian philosopher Alexandre Kojève in Paris, whose lectures Bloom would later introduce to the English-speaking world. While teaching philosophy at the École Normale Supérieure (Paris), he befriended Raymond Aron, amongst many other philosophers. Among the American expatriate community in Paris, his friends included writer Susan Sontag.

== Career and death ==
Bloom studied and taught in Paris (1953–55) at the École Normale Supérieure, and Germany (1957). Upon returning to the United States in 1955, he taught adult education students at the University of Chicago with his friend Werner J. Dannhauser, author of Nietzsche's View of Socrates. Bloom went on to teach at Yale from 1960 to 1963, at Cornell until 1970, and at the University of Toronto until 1979, when he returned to the University of Chicago. Among Bloom's former students are prominent journalists, government officials and political scientists such as Francis Fukuyama, Robert Kraynak, Pierre Hassner, Clifford Orwin, Janet Ajzenstat, John Ibbitson, James Ceaser, and Thomas Pangle.

In 1963, as a professor at Cornell, Allan Bloom served as a faculty member of the Cornell Branch of the Telluride Association, an organization focused on intellectual development and self-governance. The students received free room and board in the Telluride House on the Cornell University campus and assumed the management of the house themselves. While living at the house, Bloom befriended former U.S. Secretary of Labor Frances Perkins. Bloom's first book was a collection of three essays on Shakespeare's plays, Shakespeare's Politics; it included an essay from Harry V. Jaffa. He translated and commented upon Rousseau's "Letter to M. d'Alembert on the Theater", bringing it into dialogue with Plato's Republic. In 1968, he published his most significant work of philosophical translation and interpretation, a translation of Plato's Republic. Bloom strove to achieve "translation ... for the serious student". The preface opens on page xi with the statement, "this is intended to be a literal translation." Although the translation is not universally accepted, Bloom said he always conceptualized the translator's role as a matchmaker between readers and the texts he translated. He repeated this effort as a professor of political science at the University of Toronto in 1978, translating Jean-Jacques Rousseau's Emile. Among other publications during his years of teaching was a reading of Swift's Gulliver's Travels, titled "Giants and Dwarfs"; it became the title for a collection of essays on, among others, Raymond Aron, Alexandre Kojève, Leo Strauss, and liberal philosopher John Rawls. Bloom was an editor for the scholarly journal Political Theory as well as a contributor to History of Political Philosophy (edited by Joseph Cropsey and Leo Strauss).

After returning to Chicago, he befriended and taught courses with Saul Bellow. In 1987 Bellow wrote the preface to The Closing of the American Mind.

Bloom's last book, which he dictated while in the hospital dying, and which was published posthumously, was Love and Friendship, an offering of interpretations on the meaning of love. There is an ongoing controversy over Bloom's semi-closeted homosexuality, possibly culminating, as in Saul Bellow's thinly fictionalized account in Ravelstein, in his death in 1992 from AIDS. Bloom's friends do not deny his homosexuality, but whether he actually died of AIDS remains disputed.

== Philosophy ==
Bloom attempted to preserve a philosophical way of life for future generations through both scholarly and popular writing. His writings may be placed into two categories: scholarly (e.g., Plato's Republic) and popular political commentary (e.g., The Closing of the American Mind).

=== The Republic of Plato ===
Bloom's translation and essay on the Republic is radically different in many important aspects from the previous translations and interpretations of the Republic. Most notable is Bloom's discussion of Socratic irony. In fact, irony is the key to Bloom's understanding of the Republic (see his discussion of Books II–VI of the Republic.) Allan Bloom says a philosopher is immune to irony because he can see the tragic as comic and comic as tragic. Bloom refers to Socrates, the philosopher par excellence, in his Interpretative Essay stating, "Socrates can go naked where others go clothed; he is not afraid of ridicule. He can also contemplate sexual intercourse where others are stricken with terror; he is not afraid of moral indignation. In other words he treats the comic seriously and the tragic lightly". Thus irony in the Republic refers to the "Just City in Speech", which Bloom looks at not as a model for future society, nor as a template for the human soul; rather, it is a city presented ironically, an example of the distance between philosophy and every potential philosopher. Bloom follows Strauss in suggesting that the "Just City in Speech" is not natural; it is man-made.

==== Critical reception ====
Some reviewers, such as Norman Gulley, criticized the quality of both the translation and the essay itself.

== The Closing of the American Mind ==
The Closing of the American Mind was published in 1987, five years after Bloom published an essay in National Review about the failure of universities to serve the needs of students. With the encouragement of Saul Bellow, his colleague at the University of Chicago, he expanded his thoughts into a book "about a life I've led", that critically reflected on the current state of higher education in American universities. His friends and admirers imagined the work would be a modest success, as did Bloom, who recognized his publisher's modest advance to complete the project as a lack of sales confidence. Yet on the momentum of strong initial reviews, including one by Christopher Lehmann-Haupt in The New York Times and an op-ed piece by syndicated conservative commentator George Will titled, "A How-To Book for the Independent", it became an unexpected best seller, eventually selling close to half a million copies in hardback and remaining at number one on The New York Times Bestseller List for nonfiction for four months.

The book is a critique of the contemporary university and how Bloom sees it as failing its students. In it, Bloom criticizes the modern movements in philosophy and the humanities. Philosophy professors involved in ordinary language analysis or logical positivism disregard important "humanizing" ethical and political issues and fail to pique the interest of students. Literature professors involved in deconstructionism promote irrationalism and skepticism of standards of truth and thereby dissolve the moral imperatives which are communicated through genuine philosophy and which elevate and broaden the intellects of those who engage with them. To a great extent, Bloom's criticism revolves around his belief that the "great books" of Western thought have been devalued as a source of wisdom. Bloom's critique extends beyond the university to speak to the general crisis in American society. The Closing of the American Mind draws analogies between the United States and the Weimar Republic. The modern liberal philosophy, he says, enshrined in the Enlightenment thought of John Locke—that a just society could be based upon self-interest alone, coupled by the emergence of relativism in American thought—had led to this crisis.

For Bloom, this created a void in the souls of Americans, into which demagogic radicals as exemplified by 1960s student leaders could leap. (In the same fashion, Bloom suggests, the Nazi brownshirts once filled the gap created in German society by the Weimar Republic.) In the second instance, he argued, the higher calling of philosophy and reason understood as freedom of thought, had been eclipsed by a pseudo-philosophy, or an ideology of thought. Relativism was one feature of modern liberal philosophy that had subverted the Platonic–Socratic teaching.

Bloom's critique of contemporary social movements at play in universities or society at large is derived from his classical and philosophical orientation. For Bloom, the failure of contemporary liberal education leads to the sterile social and sexual habits of modern students, and to their inability to fashion a life for themselves beyond the mundane offerings touted as success. Bloom argues that commercial pursuits had become more highly valued than love, the philosophic quest for truth, or the civilized pursuits of honor and glory.

In one chapter, in a style of analysis which resembles the work of the Frankfurt School, he examined the philosophical effects of popular music on the lives of students, placing pop music, or as it is generically branded by record companies "rock music", in a historical context from Plato's Republic to Nietzsche's Dionysian longings. Treating it for the first time with genuine philosophical interest, he gave fresh attention to the industry, its target-marketing to children and teenagers, its top performers, its place in the late-capitalist bourgeois economy, and its pretensions to liberation and freedom. Some critics, including the popular musician Frank Zappa, argued that Bloom's view of pop music was based on the same ideas that critics of pop "in 1950s held, ideas about the preservation of 'traditional' white American society".

Bloom, informed by Socrates, Aristotle, Rousseau, and Nietzsche, explores music's power over the human soul. He cites the soldier who throws himself into battle at the urging of the drum corps, the pious believer who prays under the spell of a religious hymn, the lover seduced by the romantic guitar, and points towards the tradition of philosophy that treated musical education as paramount. He names the pop-star Mick Jagger as a cardinal representative of the hypocrisy and erotic sterility of pop-rock music. Pop music employs sexual images and language to enthrall the young and to persuade them that their petty rebelliousness is authentic politics, when, in fact, they are being controlled by the money-managers whom successful performers like Jagger quietly serve. Bloom claims that Jagger is a hero to many university students who envy his fame and wealth but are really just bored by the lack of options before them.

Along with the absence of literature in the lives of the young and their sexual but often unerotic relationships, the first part of The Closing tries to explain the current state of education in a fashion beyond the purview of an economist or psychiatrist—contemporary culture's leading umpires.

=== Critical reception ===
The book met with early critical acclaim including positive reviews in The New York Times, Time, Newsweek, the Chronicle of Higher Education, and The Washington Post. A second round of reviews was generally more critical.

Martha Nussbaum, a political philosopher and classicist, and Harry V. Jaffa, a conservative, argued that Bloom was deeply influenced by 19th-century European philosophers, especially Friedrich Nietzsche. Nussbaum wrote that, for Bloom, Nietzsche had been disastrously influential in modern American thought.

In a passage of her review, Nussbaum wrote: "How good a philosopher, then, is Allan Bloom? The answer is, we cannot say, and we are given no reason to think him one at all." The criticism of the book was continued by impassioned reviews of political theorist Benjamin Barber in Harper's; Alexander Nehamas, a scholar of ancient philosophy and Nietzsche, in the London Review of Books; and David Rieff in The Times Literary Supplement. David Rieff called Bloom "an academic version of Oliver North: vengeful, reactionary, antidemocratic". The book, he said, was one that "decent people would be ashamed of having written." The tone of these reviews led James Atlas in The New York Times Magazine to conclude that "the responses to Bloom's book have been charged with a hostility that transcends the usual mean-spiritedness of reviewers." One reviewer, the philosopher Robert Paul Wolff writing in the scholarly journal Academe, satirically reviewed the book as a work of fiction: he claimed that Bloom's friend Saul Bellow, who had written the introduction, had written a "coruscatingly funny novel in the form of a pettish, bookish, grumpy, reactionary complaint against the last two decades", with the "author" a "mid-fiftyish professor at the University of Chicago, to whom Bellow gives the evocative name 'Bloom.'" Yet some reviewers tempered that criticism with an admission of the merits of Bloom's writing: for example, Fred Matthews, an historian from York University, began an otherwise relatively critical review in the American Historical Review with the statement that Bloom's "probes into popular culture" were "both amusing and perceptive" and that the work was "a rich, often brilliant, and disturbing book".

Some critics embraced Bloom's argument. Norman Podhoretz noted that the closed-mindedness in the title refers to the paradoxical consequence of the academic "open mind" found in liberal political thought—namely "the narrow and intolerant dogmatism" that dismisses any attempt, by Plato or the Hebrew Bible for example, to provide a rational basis for moral judgments. Podhoretz continued, "Bloom goes on to charge liberalism with vulgarizing the noble ideals of freedom and equality, and he offers brilliantly acerbic descriptions of the sexual revolution and the feminist movement, which he sees as products of this process of vulgarization."

In a 1989 article, Ann Clark Fehn discusses the critical reception of the book, noting that it had eclipsed other titles that year dealing with higher education—Ernest Boyer's College and E. D. Hirsch's Cultural Literacy—and quoting Publishers Weekly which had described Bloom's book as a "best-seller made by reviews."

Camille Paglia, a decade after the book's release, called it "the first shot in the culture wars". An early New York Times review by Roger Kimball called the book "an unparalleled reflection on the whole question of what it means to be a student in today's intellectual and moral climate."

In an article on Bloom for The New Republic in 2000, conservative commentator Andrew Sullivan wrote that "reading [Bloom] ... one feels he has not merely understood Nietzsche; he has imbibed him. But this awareness of the abyss moved Bloom, unlike Nietzsche, toward love and political conservatism. Love, whether for the truth or for another, because it can raise us out of the abyss. Political conservatism because it best restrains the chaos that modernity threatens". More recently, Bloom's book also received a more positive re-assessment from Jim Sleeper in The New York Times.

Keith Botsford would later argue:

Bloom was writing vigorous polemic at a time when America sought to ensure that the intellect could not (and would not be allowed to) rise above gender and race; the mind was to be defined by its melanin and genetic content, and by what lay between our legs; or, in the academe, the canon was to be re-read and re-defined so that it fitted the latest theorem of gender or race. Bloom would have none of it. He loved people who were first-rate with real love ... Many profited. Others, mainly dwellers in the bas fonds of 'social studies', or those who seek to politicise culture, resented and envied.

== Love and Friendship ==
Bloom's last book, which he dictated while partially paralyzed and in the hospital, and which was published posthumously, was Love and Friendship. The book offered interpretations on the meaning of love, through a reading of novels by Stendhal, Jane Austen, and Flaubert; Tolstoy in light of Rousseau's influence on the Romantic movement; plays by William Shakespeare; Montaigne's Essays; and Plato's Symposium.

Describing its creation, Bellow wrote:

Allan was an academic, but he was a literary man too — he had too much intelligence and versatility, too much humanity, to be confined to a single category ... He didn't like these helpful-to-the-sick cliches or conventional get-well encouragements ... [S]till partially paralyzed and unable even to sign his name, he dictated a book ... I mention this because it was a remarkable thing for a sick man and a convalescent to do and because it was equally remarkable that a political philosopher should choose at such a moment in his life to write about literature ... I like to think that his free and powerful intelligence, responding to great inner impulses under the stimulus of life-threatening sickness, turned to the nineteenth-century novel, to Shakespeare's love plays, and to the Platonic Eros, summoning us to the great poetry of affects and asking us to see what has happened to our own deepest feelings in this age of artificial euphorias.

Of Love and Friendship Andrew Sullivan wrote, "you cannot read [Bloom] on Romeo and Juliet or Antony and Cleopatra without seeing those works in a new light. You cannot read his account of Rousseau's La nouvelle Heloise without wanting to go back and read it—more closely—again.... Bloom had a gift for reading reality—the impulse to put your loving face to it and press your hands against it". Recollecting his friend in an interview, Bellow said "Allan inhaled books and ideas the way the rest of us breathe air.... People only want the factual truth. Well, the truth is that Allan was a very superior person, great-souled. When critics proclaim the death of the novel, I sometimes think they are really saying that there are no significant people to write about. [But] Allan was certainly one."

== Personal life ==
Bloom was gay. His last book, Love and Friendship, was dedicated to his companion, Michael Z. Wu. Whether or not he died of AIDS is a subject of controversy.

== Selected works ==
- Bloom, Allan, and Harry V. Jaffa. 1964. Shakespeare's Politics. New York: Basic Books.
- Bloom, Allan. 1968 (2nd ed 1991). The Republic of Plato. (translated with notes and an interpretive essay). New York: Basic Books.
- Bloom, Allan, Charles Butterworth, Christopher Kelly (Edited and translated), and Jean-Jacques Rousseau. 1968. Letter to d'Alembert on the theater in politics and the arts. Ithaca, NY: Cornell University Press; Agora ed.
- Bloom, Allan, and Jean-Jacques Rousseau. 1979. Emile (translator) with introduction. New York: Basic Books.
- Alexandre Kojève (Raymond Queneau, Allan Bloom, James H. Nichols). Introduction to the reading of Hegel. Cornell, 1980.
- Bloom, Allan. 1987. The Closing of the American Mind. New York: Simon & Schuster. ISBN 5-551-86868-0.
- Bloom, Allan, and Steven J. Kautz, eds. 1991. Confronting the Constitution: The Challenge to Locke, Montesquieu, Jefferson, and the Federalists from Utilitarianism, Historicism, Marxism, Freudianism, Pragmatism, Existentialism--. Washington, DC: American Enterprise Institute for Public Policy Research.
- Bloom, Allan. 1991. Giants and Dwarfs: Essays, 1960–1990. New York: Touchstone Books.
- Bloom, Allan. 1993. Love and Friendship. New York: Simon & Schuster.
- Bloom, Allan. 2000. Shakespeare on Love & Friendship. Chicago: University of Chicago Press.
- Plato, Seth Benardete, and Allan Bloom. 2001. Plato's Symposium: A translation by Seth Benardete with commentaries by Allan Bloom and Seth Benardete. Chicago: University of Chicago Press.

== See also ==
- American philosophy
- List of American philosophers
