= Leora Batnitzky =

American philosopher

Leora Faye Batnitzky
- Born: May 6, 1966 (age 60); Kansas City, Kansas, U.S.
- Education: Jewish Theological Seminary of America (BA); Princeton University (PhD)
- Occupations: Philosopher; professor
- Notable work: How Judaism Became a Religion (2011)
- Title: Ronald O. Perelman Professor of Jewish Studies
- Awards: PROSE Award, Theology & Religious Studies (2011); American Theological Society; Society (2011)

Leora Faye Batnitzky (born 1966) is an American philosopher and the current Ronald O. Perelman Professor of Jewish Studies at Princeton University. Her research interests include religion, modern Jewish thought, hermeneutics, and contemporary legal and political theory. Batnitzky also serves as Princeton's Clerk of the Faculty as of 2025. She served as Chair of the Department of Religion from 2010 to 2019 and Director of Princeton's Program in Judaic Studies until 2025. Batnitzky is the editor of The Princeton Companion to Jewish Studies.

Batnitzky has been called "the most incisive and remarkable scholar of modern Jewish thought of our time," and is considered to have introduced a paradigm shift to academic political theology, Zionism, and Judaic Studies. She is recognized as the leading scholar of Leo Strauss.

How Judaism Became a Religion was named by The Forward as one of the most important books to read to understand the Israeli-Palestinian conflict. She has published in popular journals on Jewish-Catholic relations and in major media on questions of Jewish identity and ethnicity.

== Personal life ==
Batnitzky married Robert Lebeau, the son of Rabbi William H. Lebeau, in 1990. Her mother taught Judaic studies at the Hyman Brand Hebrew Academy in Overland Park, Kansas. Her father-in-law was the vice chancellor of the Jewish Theological Seminary of America. Batnitzky is a descendant of a line of prominent European rabbis.

== Books ==
- The Princeton Companion to Jewish Studies, (Princeton University Press, 2025). ISBN 9780691215198.
- Jewish Legal Theories: Writings on Religion, State and Morality, (Brandeis University Press, 2018). ISBN 9781584657439.
- Institutionalizing Rights and Religion: Competing Supremacies (Cambridge University Press, 2017). ISBN 9781107153714.
- The Book of Job: Ethics, Aesthetics and Hermeneutics, (De Gruyter Press, 2014). ISBN 9783110333831.
- How Judaism Became a Religion (Princeton University Press; 2011). ISBN 9780691130729.
- Leo Strauss and Emmanuel Levinas: Philosophy and the Politics of Revelation (Cambridge University Press, 2006). ISBN 9780521679350.
- Idolatry and Representation: The Philosophy of Franz Rosenzweig Reconsidered (Princeton University Press, 2000). ISBN 9780691048505.
