= Laurence Lampert =

Canadian philosopher

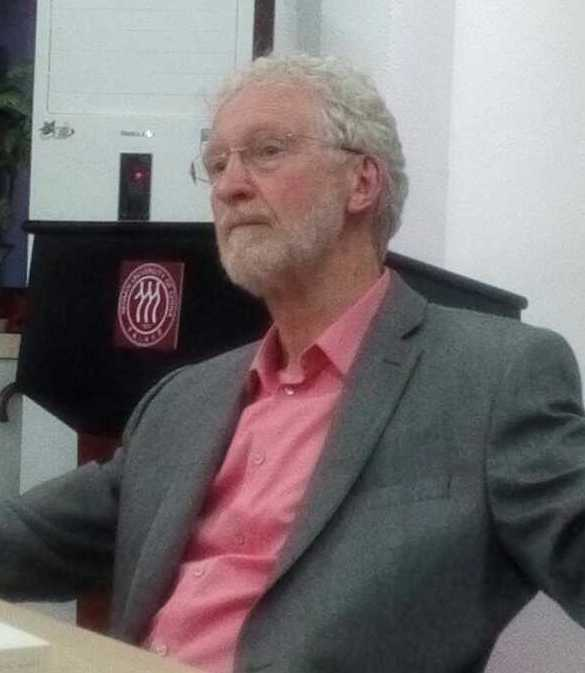

Laurence Lampert (June 10, 1941 – April 20, 2024) was a Canadian philosopher and a leading scholar in the field of Nietzsche studies. Philosopher Michael Allen Gillespie of Duke University had described Lampert as "North America's greatest living Nietzsche scholar." He is also well known for his interpretations of Plato and the German-American political philosopher Leo Strauss.

Lampert was born and raised in Winnipeg, Manitoba. He received his master's degree in 1968 and his doctorate in 1971, both from Northwestern University, with a dissertation on “The Views of History in Nietzsche and Heidegger.” He taught at Indiana University–Purdue University Indianapolis for 35 years and was a professor emeritus of philosophy.

The Indiana University Foundation has a Laurence Lampert Scholarship in Philosophy that was founded upon Lampert's retirement. Income from gifts to this endowed fund supports scholarships for undergraduate philosophy majors.

== Lectures in China ==
In the spring of 2015, Lampert was invited by Professor Liu Xiaofeng of Renmin University of China to travel to China for a monthlong tour, during which he lectured at three of China's leading universities: Renmin University of China (Beijing), Zhejiang University (Hangzhou), and Chongqing University (Chongqing). The title of his lecture series, “Strauss, Plato, Nietzsche: Philosophy and Its Poetry,” referred to the three figures in the history of Western philosophy who had been at the center of his research throughout his career.

Delivered in English and translated into Chinese, these lectures were published in a combined English and Chinese edition under the title Philosophy and Philosophic Poetry: Strauss, Plato, Nietzsche in 2021 by Huaxia Publishing House in China as part of the Collected Works of Laurence Lampert, edited by Liu Xiaofeng. These lectures appeared in English under the title The Beijing Lectures: Strauss, Plato, Nietzsche, with a new preface published by Paul Dry Books in 2024.

== "Nietzsche in the 21st Century" ==
Lampert delivered the keynote address at a 2023 conference on "Nietzsche in the 21st Century" held in Białystok, Poland.

== Books ==
- Nietzsche's Teaching: An Interpretation of Thus Spoke Zarathustra (New Haven: Yale University Press, 1986).
- Nietzsche and Modern Times: A Study of Bacon, Descartes, and Nietzsche (New Haven: Yale University Press, 1993).
- Leo Strauss and Nietzsche (Chicago: University of Chicago Press, 1996).
- Francis Bacon's Advertisement Touching a Holy War, edited, with an introduction, notes, and interpretive essay by Laurence Lampert (Prospect Heights, IL: Waveland, 2000).
- Nietzsche's Task: An Interpretation of Beyond Good and Evil (New Haven: Yale University Press, 2001).
- How Philosophy Became Socratic: A Study of Plato's "Protagoras," "Charmides," and "Republic" (Chicago: University of Chicago Press, 2010).
- The Enduring Importance of Leo Strauss (Chicago: University of Chicago Press, 2013).
- What a Philosopher Is: Becoming Nietzsche (Chicago: University of Chicago Press, 2018).
- How Socrates Became Socrates: A Study of Plato's "Phaedo," "Parmenides," and "Symposium" (Chicago: University of Chicago Pree, 2021).
- Philosophy and Philosophic Poetry: Strauss, Plato, Nietzsche (Beijing: Huaxia Press, 2021).
- The Beijing Lectures: Strauss, Plato, Nietzsche (Philadelphia: Paul Dry Books, 2024).
