= Shadia Drury =

Canadian academic

Shadia B. Drury
- Born: 1950 (age 75–76); Egypt
- Occupations: Academic, political commentator
- Awards: Fellow of the Royal Society of Canada (2005)

Academic background
- Education: Queen's University (BA) York University (PhD)

Academic work
- Discipline: Political Science, Philosophy
- Institutions: University of Calgary University of Regina
- Notable works: Aquinas and Modernity: The Lost Promise of Natural Law

Shadia B. Drury FRSC (born 1950) is a Canadian academic and political commentator. She is a professor emerita at the University of Regina. In 2005, she was elected a Fellow of the Royal Society of Canada.

== Early life and education ==
Drury was born in Egypt but earned a Bachelor of Arts at Queen's University and a PhD from York University.

== Career ==
Drury has taught Political Science and Philosophy at the University of Calgary and at the University of Regina, where she holds the Canada Research Chair in Social Justice.

In 2005, she was elected a Fellow of the Royal Society of Canada. Two years later, she published "Aquinas and Modernity: The Lost Promise of Natural Law" through the Cambridge University Press. She is also a columnist for Free Inquiry magazine.

== Criticism ==
Several political philosophers consider Drury's attacks on Leo Strauss and his followers to be unfounded. In his 2009 book, Straussophobia: Defending Leo Strauss and Straussians against Shadia Drury and Other Accusers, Peter Minowitz argues that Drury’s work is "plagued by exaggerations, misquotations, contradictions, factual errors, and defective documentation."

== Bibliography ==
- The Concept of Natural Law, Thesis (Ph.D.)--York University, 1978. Canadian Theses Division, National Library, Ottawa, Canadiana: 790230615
- Law and Politics: Readings in Legal and Political Thought. Edited with introduction and essay by Shadia B. Drury; associate editor, Rainer Knopff. Calgary: Detselig, 1980. ISBN 0-920490-12-3
- The Political Ideas of Leo Strauss, Revised Edition. New York: St. Martin's Press,(originally published in 1988) 2005.
- Alexandre Kojève: The Roots of Postmodern Politics. Palgrave Macmillan. 1994. ISBN 0-312-12092-3
- Leo Strauss and the American Right. Palgrave Macmillan. 1999. ISBN 0-312-21783-8
- Terror and Civilization: Christianity, Politics, and the Western Psyche. Palgrave Macmillan, 2004 ISBN 1-4039-6404-1
- Aquinas and Modernity: The Lost Promise of Natural Law. Rowman & Littlefield Publishers, Inc. 2008. ISBN 0-7425-2258-X

== See also ==
- Political philosophy
- Straussian
- Neoconservatism
- Clash of Civilizations
