= Joseph Cropsey =

American philosopher

Joseph Cropsey (August 27, 1919 – July 1, 2012) was an American political philosopher and professor emeritus of political science at the University of Chicago, where he was also associate director of the John M. Olin Center for Inquiry into the Theory and Practice of Democracy.

== Biography ==
Cropsey was born in New York City. He was a student of Leo Strauss, who inspired him to move from his original academic field—economic thought—to a much more theoretical approach to political thought. Following this, Cropsey focused on Plato and the interstitial philosophical aspects of the theories developed by such thinkers as Adam Smith and Karl Marx.

He received the Quantrell Award. He died in Washington, D.C.

His son, Seth Cropsey (a graduate of St. John's College), is an analyst for the Hudson Institute, where he is the Director for the Center for American Seapower.

== Bibliography ==
- Joseph Cropsey (ed.), Ancients and Moderns: Essays on the Tradition of Political Philosophy in Honor of Leo Strauss, New York, Basic Books, 1964 ISBN 0-465-00326-5
- Joseph Cropsey, Political Philosophy and the Issues of Politics, Chicago & London, University of Chicago Press, 1977 ISBN 0-226-12123-2
- Joseph Cropsey, Plato's World: Man's Place in the Cosmos (1995), Chicago & London, University of Chicago Press, 1997 ISBN 0-226-12122-4
- Joseph Cropsey, Polity and Economy: An Interpretation of the Principles of Adam Smith (With Further Thoughts on the Principles of Adam Smith), Chicago, St. Augustine's Press, 2001 (Revised Edition) ISBN 1-58731-625-0
- Thomas Hobbes (edited by Joseph Cropsey), A Dialogue between a Philosopher and a Student of the Common Laws of England (written between 1668 and 1675), Chicago & London, University of Chicago Press, 1997 ISBN 0-226-34541-6
- Leo Strauss, Joseph Cropsey (eds.), History of Political Philosophy (First Edition: 1963), Chicago & London, University of Chicago Press, 1987 ISBN 0-226-77710-3
- Joseph Cropsey, On Humanity's Intensive Introspection, South Bend, IN, St. Augustine's Press, 2012 ISBN 978-1-58731-611-1

== See also ==
- American philosophy
- List of American philosophers
