= Ralph Lerner (philosopher) =

American political philosopher (born 1928)

Ralph Lerner (born 1928) is an American political philosopher.

Lerner was born in Chicago, and attended the University of Chicago for his bachelor's, master's, and doctoral degrees in political science. His Ph.D. was advised by Leo Strauss. Lerner later joined the Chicago faculty, where he was named the Benjamin Franklin Professorship until 2003, when he was granted emeritus status. He received the Quantrell Award. In keeping with a long-standing tradition of having fully tenured faculty teach 1st and 2nd year undergraduates at the University of Chicago, Professor Lerner taught a very popular course, Classics of Social and Political Thought, as part of the Social Sciences requirement of the Core Curriculum. Works discussed in this course included Leviathan by Thomas Hobbes, The Second Treatise on Civil Government by John Locke, The Social Contract by Jean-Jacques Rousseau, and The Federalist Papers by Alexander Hamilton, James Madison, and John Jay. He also taught an advanced course focusing exclusively on Alexis de Tocqueville's seminal work Democracy in America.

== Books ==
- Naïve Readings: Reveilles Political and Philosophic, University of Chicago Press, 2016
- Playing the Fool: Subversive Laughter in Troubled Times, University of Chicago Press, 2009
- Maimonides' Empire of Light: Popular Enlightenment in an Age of Belief, University of Chicago Press, 2000
- Revolutions Revisited: Two Faces of the Politics of Enlightenment, University of North Carolina Press, 1994
- The Thinking Revolutionary: Principle and Practice in the New Republic, Cornell University Press, 1987
- The Founders' Constitution, edited with Philip B. Kurland, 5-volume hardback set published by University of Chicago Press in 1987, 5-volume paperback set published by the Liberty Fund in 2000
- Averroes on Plato's 'Republic', translated by Ralph Lerner, Cornell University Press, 1974
- Medieval Political Philosophy: A Sourcebook, Cornell University Press, 1963
