= Leo Strauss =

American political philosopher (1899–1973)

Leo Strauss BVO
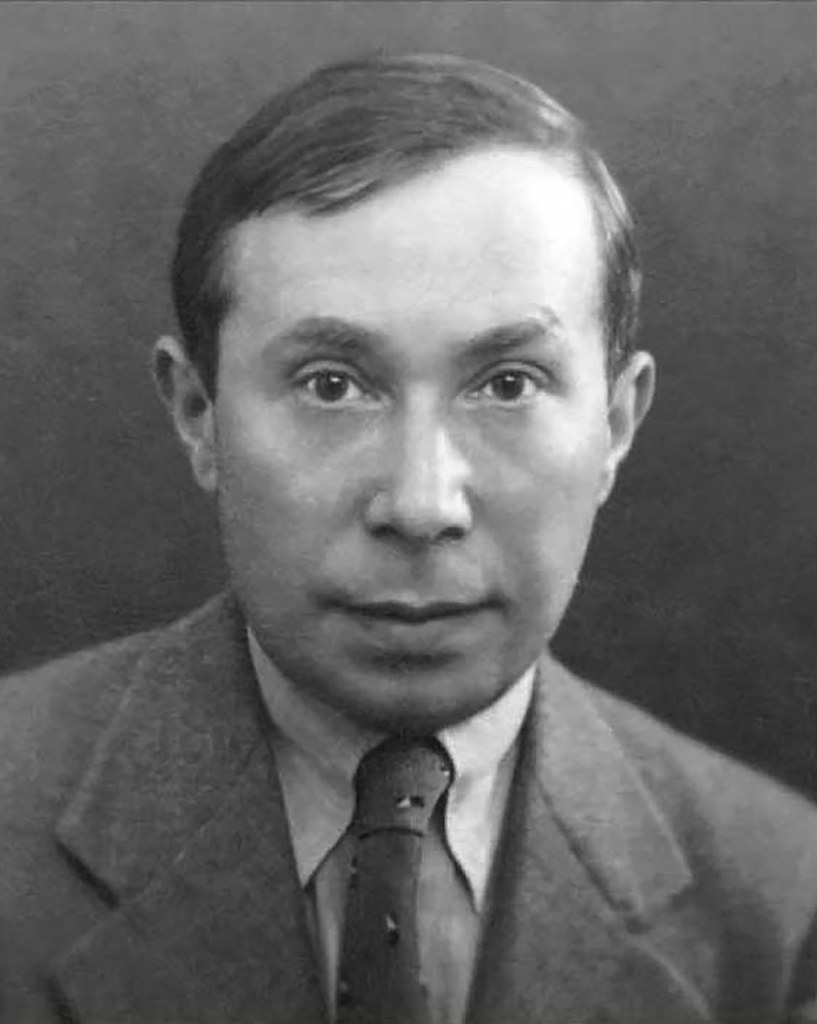
- Strauss in 1939
- Born: September 20, 1899; Kirchhain, Kingdom of Prussia, German Empire
- Died: October 18, 1973 (aged 74); Annapolis, Maryland, U.S.
- Spouse: Miriam Bernsohn Strauss
- Children: 2, including Jenny Strauss Clay

Education
- Education: University of Marburg; University of Hamburg (PhD); University of Freiburg
- Thesis: On the Problem of Knowledge in the Philosophical Doctrine of F. H. Jacobi (1921)
- Doctoral advisor: Ernst Cassirer
- Other advisors: Martin Heidegger; Edmund Husserl

Philosophical work
- Era: Contemporary philosophy
- Region: Western philosophy
- School: Continental philosophy (early); Straussian hermeneutics; Modern Platonism (posthumous attribution)
- Institutions: Higher Institute for Jewish Studies; Columbia University; University of Cambridge; The New School; Hamilton College; University of Chicago; Claremont McKenna College; St. John's College
- Doctoral students: Seth Benardete; Allan Bloom; Christopher Bruell; Werner Dannhauser; Harry Jaffa; Ralph Lerner; Muhsin Mahdi; Stanley Rosen
- Notable students: George Anastaplo; Walter Berns; Joseph Cropsey; Murray Dry; Thomas Pangle; Herbert Storing; Catherine Zuckert; Michael Zuckert
- Main interests: Political philosophy; History of philosophy (especially Greek, Islamic, Jewish and continental philosophy); Philosophy of religion
- Notable works: Persecution and the Art of Writing; Thoughts on Machiavelli; History of Political Philosophy
- Notable ideas: List: Noetic heterogeneity; The ends of politics and philosophy as irreducible to one another; The unresolvable tension between reason and revelation; Criticism of positivism, moral relativism, historicism, liberalism, and nihilism; Ancient liberalism; The distinction between esoteric and exoteric writing; Reopening the quarrel of the ancients and the moderns; Reductio ad Hitlerum

Leo Strauss (Note: /straʊs/ STROWSS; German: [ˈleːoː ˈʃtʁaʊs]) (September 20, 1899 – October 18, 1973) was a German-American political philosopher and historian of philosophy whose work greatly influenced twentieth-century political theory in the United States and the study of classical political thought. He is known best for his interpretation of ancient and medieval philosophy, his account of classical natural right, and his claim that philosophers often wrote esoterically, presenting different teachings to general and specialist readers. Strauss argued that the modern turn in philosophy, beginning with Niccolò Machiavelli and culminating in historicism and relativism, marked a decisive break with the classical understanding of politics and the good life. His work sought to recover the questions and methods of ancient political philosophy as a corrective to the perceived crisis of modern thought.

Born in Germany to Jewish parents, he emigrated to the United States in 1937, going on to hold positions at the New School for Social Research and later at the University of Chicago, where he taught from 1949 to 1969. His seminars shaped several generations of political theorists, many of whom became influential scholars in their own right at major American universities. Strauss's students and interlocutors played significant roles in the development of political philosophy in the postwar United States, particularly in the neoconservative movement; his ideas have been taken up and debated within fields including political theory, classics, intellectual history, and religious studies. His major works include Natural Right and History (1953), Persecution and the Art of Writing (1952), The City and Man (1964), and On Tyranny (1948). Strauss's work has also been the subject of debate, including disputes over his interpretations of ancient texts and discussions of the political influence of some of his students, though these issues remain contested within academic scholarship.

Strauss's scholarship ranges from studies of Plato, Aristotle, and Xenophon to examinations of Thomas Hobbes, Baruch Spinoza, Friedrich Nietzsche, and the medieval Islamic and Jewish philosophical traditions, particularly Al-Farabi and Maimonides. Central to his writings is the tension between reason and revelation, the nature of political prudence, and the relationship between philosophy and political authority. His methodological emphasis on close textual reading, the pedagogical value of classical texts, and the critique of modernity formed the basis of what came to be known as "Straussian" approaches to political theory.

== Biography ==
=== Early life and education ===
Leo Strauss was born on September 20, 1899, in the small town of Kirchhain in Hesse-Nassau, a province of the Kingdom of Prussia (part of the German Empire), to Jennie Strauss (née David) and Hugo Strauss. According to Allan Bloom's 1974 obituary in Political Theory, Strauss "was raised as an Orthodox Jew", but the family does not appear to have completely embraced Orthodox practice. Strauss himself noted that he came from a "conservative, even orthodox Jewish home", but one which knew little about Judaism except strict adherence to ceremonial laws. His father and uncle operated a farm supply and livestock business that they inherited from their father, Meyer (1835–1919), a leading member of the local Jewish community.

After attending the Kirchhain Volksschule and the Protestant Rektoratsschule, Leo Strauss was enrolled at the Gymnasium Philippinum (affiliated with the University of Marburg) in nearby Marburg (from which Johannes Althusius and Carl Joachim Friedrich also graduated) in 1912, graduating in 1917. He boarded with the Marburg cantor Strauss (no relation), whose residence served as a meeting place for followers of the neo-Kantian philosopher Hermann Cohen. Strauss served in the German army during World War I from July 5, 1917, to December 1918.

Strauss subsequently enrolled in the University of Hamburg, where he received his doctorate in 1921; his thesis, On the Problem of Knowledge in the Philosophical Doctrine of F. H. Jacobi (Das Erkenntnisproblem in der philosophischen Lehre Fr. H. Jacobis), was supervised by Ernst Cassirer. He also attended courses at the Universities of Freiburg and Marburg, including some taught by Edmund Husserl and Martin Heidegger. Strauss joined a Jewish fraternity and worked for the German Zionist movement, which introduced him to various German Jewish intellectuals, such as Norbert Elias, Leo Löwenthal, Hannah Arendt, and Walter Benjamin. Benjamin was and remained an admirer of Strauss and his work throughout his life.

Strauss's closest friend was Jacob Klein but he also was intellectually engaged with Gerhard Krüger—and also Karl Löwith, Julius Guttmann, Hans-Georg Gadamer, and Franz Rosenzweig (to whom Strauss dedicated his first book), as well as Gershom Scholem, Alexander Altmann, and the Arabist Paul Kraus, who married Strauss's sister Bettina (Strauss and his wife later adopted Paul and Bettina Kraus's child when both parents died in the Middle East). With several of these friends, Strauss carried on vigorous epistolary exchanges later in life, many of which are published in the Gesammelte Schriften (Collected Writings), some of which are in translation from the German. Strauss had also been engaged in a discourse with Carl Schmitt. However, after Strauss left Germany, he broke off the discourse when Schmitt failed to respond to his letters.

=== Career ===
After receiving a Rockefeller Fellowship in 1932, Strauss left his position at the Higher Institute for Jewish Studies in Berlin for Paris. He returned to Germany only once, for a few short days, twenty years later. In Paris, he married Marie (Miriam) Bernsohn, a widow with a young child, whom he had known previously in Germany. He adopted his wife's son, Thomas, and later his sister's child, Jenny Strauss Clay (later a professor of classics at the University of Virginia); he and Miriam had no biological children of their own. At his death, he was survived by Thomas, Jenny Strauss Clay, and three grandchildren. Strauss became a lifelong friend of Alexandre Kojève and was on friendly terms with Raymond Aron and Étienne Gilson. Because of the Nazis' rise to power, he chose not to return to his native country. Strauss found shelter, after some vicissitudes, in England, where, in 1935, he gained temporary employment at the University of Cambridge with the help of his in-law David Daube, who was affiliated with Gonville and Caius College. While in England, he became a close friend of R. H. Tawney and was on less friendly terms with Isaiah Berlin.

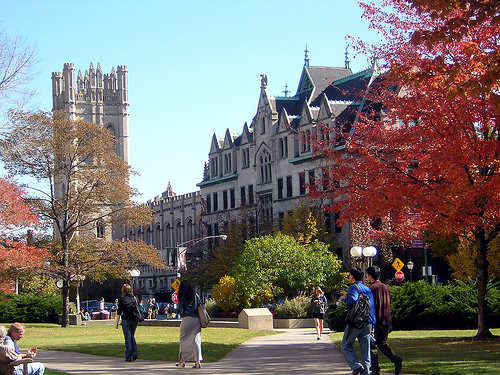
The University of Chicago, the school with which Strauss is most closely associated

Unable to find permanent employment in England, Strauss moved to the United States in 1937, under the patronage of Harold Laski, who made introductions and helped him obtain a brief lectureship. After a short stint as a research fellow in the Department of History at Columbia University, Strauss secured a position at The New School, where, between 1938 and 1948, he worked in the political science faculty and also held adjunct positions. In 1939, he served for a short term as a visiting professor at Hamilton College. He became a U.S. citizen in 1944 and, in 1949, became a professor of political science at the University of Chicago, holding the Robert Maynard Hutchins Distinguished Service Professorship until he left in 1969.

In 1953, Strauss coined the phrase reductio ad Hitlerum, a play on reductio ad absurdum, suggesting that comparing an argument to one of Hitler's, or "playing the Nazi card", is often a fallacy of irrelevance.

In 1954, he met Karl Löwith and Hans-Georg Gadamer in Heidelberg and delivered a public speech on Socrates. He had received a call for a temporary lectureship in Hamburg in 1965 (which he declined for health reasons). He received and accepted an honorary doctorate from the University of Hamburg and the German Order of Merit via the German representative in Chicago. In 1969, Strauss moved to Claremont McKenna College (formerly Claremont Men's College) in California for a year, and then to St. John's College, Annapolis, in 1970, where he was the Scott Buchanan Distinguished Scholar in Residence until his death from pneumonia in 1973. He was buried in Annapolis Hebrew Cemetery, with his wife Miriam Bernsohn Strauss, who died in 1985. Psalm 114 was read in the funeral service at the request of family and friends.

== Thought ==
Strauss's thought can be characterized by two main themes: the critique of modernity and the recovery of classical political philosophy. He argued that modernity, which emerged among the 15th century Italian city states particularly in the writings of Niccolò Machiavelli, was a radical break from the tradition of Western civilization, and that it led to a crisis of nihilism, relativism, historicism, and scientism. He claimed that modern political and social sciences, which were based on empirical observation and rational analysis, failed to grasp the essential questions of human nature, morality, and justice, and that they reduced human beings to mere objects of manipulation and calculation. He also criticized modern liberalism, which he saw as a product of modernity, for lacking moral and spiritual foundations and for its tendency to undermine the authority of religion, tradition, and natural law.

To overcome the crisis of modernity, Strauss proposed a return to the classical political philosophy of the ancient Greeks and the medieval thinkers, who he believed had a deeper and more comprehensive understanding of human nature and society. He advocated a careful and respectful reading of the classical texts, arguing that their authors wrote in an esoteric manner, which he called "the art of writing". He suggested that the classical authors hid their true teachings behind a surface layer of conventional opinions to avoid persecution and to educate only the few capable of grasping them, and that they engaged in dialogue with one another across the ages. Strauss called this dialogue "the great conversation", and invited his readers to join it.

Strauss's interpretation of classical political philosophy was influenced by his Jewish background and his engagement with medieval Islamic and Jewish philosophy, especially the works of Al-Farabi and Maimonides. He argued that these philosophers, who lived under the rule of Islam, faced challenges similar to those of the ancient Greeks. He also claimed that these philosophers, who were both faithful to their revealed religions and loyal to the rational pursuit of philosophy, offered a model of how to reconcile reason and revelation, philosophy and theology, Athens and Jerusalem.

== Views ==
=== Philosophy ===
For Strauss, politics and philosophy were necessarily intertwined. He regarded the trial and death of Socrates as the moment when political philosophy came into existence. Strauss considered one of the most important moments in the history of philosophy Socrates' argument that philosophers could not study nature without considering their own human nature, which, in the words of Aristotle, is that of "a political animal." However, he also held that the ends of politics and philosophy were inherently irreconcilable and irreducible to one another.

Strauss distinguished "scholars" from "great thinkers," identifying himself as a scholar. He wrote that most self-described philosophers are, in fact, cautious and methodical scholars. Great thinkers, in contrast, boldly and creatively address big problems. Scholars address these problems only indirectly by reasoning about the differences among the great thinkers.

In Natural Right and History, Strauss begins with a critique of Max Weber's epistemology, briefly engages the relativism of Martin Heidegger (who goes unnamed) and continues with a discussion of the evolution of natural rights via an analysis of the thought of Thomas Hobbes and John Locke. He concludes by critiquing Jean-Jacques Rousseau and Edmund Burke. At the heart of the book are excerpts from Plato, Aristotle, and Cicero. Much of his philosophy is a reaction to Heidegger's work. Indeed, Strauss wrote that Heidegger's thinking must be understood and confronted before any complete formulation of modern political theory is possible, which means that political thought must engage with issues of ontology and the history of metaphysics.

Strauss wrote that Friedrich Nietzsche was the first philosopher to understand historicism properly, an idea grounded in a general acceptance of Hegelian philosophy of history. Heidegger, in Strauss's view, sanitized and politicized Nietzsche, whereas Nietzsche believed "our own principles, including the belief in progress, will become as unconvincing and alien as all earlier principles (essences) had shown themselves to be" and "the only way out seems to be ... that one voluntarily choose life-giving delusion instead of deadly truth, that one fabricate a myth." Heidegger believed that the tragic nihilism of Nietzsche was itself a "myth" guided by a defective Western conception of Being that Heidegger traced to Plato. In his published correspondence with Alexandre Kojève, Strauss wrote that Georg Wilhelm Friedrich Hegel was correct when he postulated that an end of history implies an end to philosophy as understood by classical political philosophy.

=== On reading ===
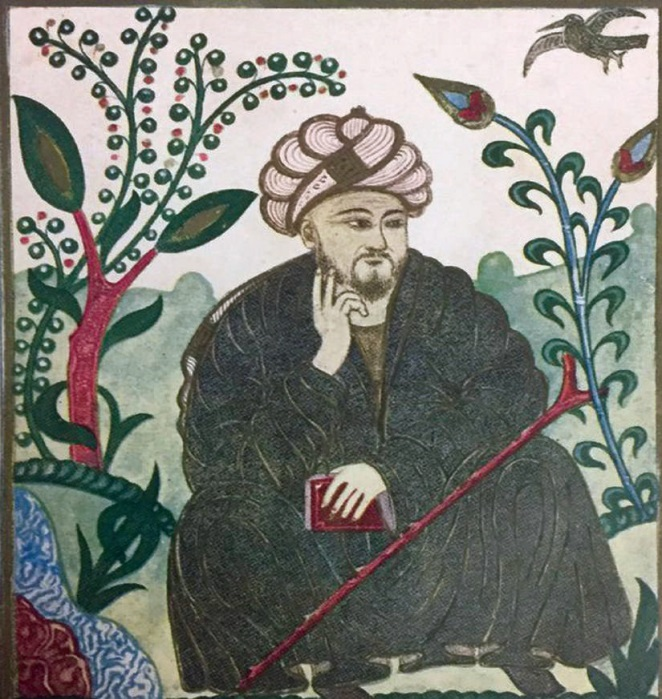
Strauss's study of philosophy and political discourses produced by the Islamic civilization—especially those of Al-Farabi (pictured) and Maimonides—was instrumental in the development of his theory of reading.

In the late 1930s, Strauss first called for a reconsideration of the "distinction between exoteric (or public) and esoteric (or secret) teaching." In 1952, he published Persecution and the Art of Writing, arguing that serious writers write esoterically, that is, with multiple or layered meanings, often disguised within irony or paradox, obscure references, even deliberate self-contradiction. Esoteric writing serves several purposes: protecting the philosopher from the retribution of the regime, and protecting the regime from the corrosion of philosophy; it attracts the right kind of reader and repels the wrong kind; and ferreting out the interior message is in itself an exercise of philosophic reasoning.

Taking his bearings from his study of Maimonides and Al-Farabi, and pointing further back to Plato's discussion of writing as contained in the Phaedrus, Strauss proposed that the classical and medieval art of esoteric writing is the proper medium for philosophic learning: rather than displaying philosophers' thoughts superficially, classical and medieval philosophical texts guide their readers in thinking and learning independently of imparted knowledge. Thus, Strauss agrees with the Socrates of the Phaedrus, where the Greek indicates that, insofar as writing does not respond when questioned, good writing provokes questions in the reader—questions that orient the reader towards an understanding of problems the author thought about with utmost seriousness. Strauss thus, in Persecution and the Art of Writing, presents Maimonides "as a closet nonbeliever obfuscating his message for political reasons".

Strauss' hermeneutical argument—rearticulated throughout his subsequent writings (most notably in The City and Man [1964])—is that, before the 19th century, Western scholars commonly understood that philosophical writing is not at home in any polity, no matter how liberal. Insofar as it questions conventional wisdom at its roots, philosophy must guard itself especially against those readers who believe themselves authoritative, wise, and liberal defenders of the status quo. In questioning established opinions or in investigating the principles of morality, philosophers of old found it necessary to convey their messages obliquely. Their "art of writing" was esoteric communication. This was especially apparent in medieval times when heterodox political thinkers wrote under the threat of the Inquisition or comparably obtuse tribunals.

Strauss's argument is not that the medieval writers he studies reserved one exoteric meaning for the many (hoi polloi) and an esoteric, hidden one for the few (hoi oligoi), but that, through rhetorical stratagems including self-contradiction and hyperboles, these writers succeeded in conveying their proper meaning at the tacit heart of their writings—a heart or message irreducible to "the letter" or historical dimension of texts.

Explicitly following Gotthold Ephraim Lessing's lead, Strauss indicates that medieval political philosophers, no less than their ancient counterparts, carefully adapted their wording to the dominant moral views of their time, lest their writings be condemned as heretical or unjust, not by "the many" (who did not read), but by those "few" whom the many regarded as the most righteous guardians of morality. It was precisely these righteous personalities who would be most inclined to persecute/ostracize anyone who was in the business of exposing the noble or great lie upon which the authority of the few over the many stands or falls.

=== On politics ===
According to Strauss, modern social science is flawed because it assumes the fact–value distinction, a concept which Strauss found dubious. He traced its roots in Enlightenment philosophy to Max Weber, a thinker whom Strauss described as a "serious and noble mind". Weber wanted to separate values from science, but, according to Strauss, was really a derivative thinker, deeply influenced by Nietzsche's relativism. Strauss treated politics as something that could not be studied from afar. A political scientist examining politics with a value-free scientific eye, for Strauss, was self-deluded. Positivism, the heir to both Auguste Comte and Weber in the quest to make purportedly value-free judgments, failed to justify its own existence, which would require a value judgment.

While modern-era liberalism had stressed the pursuit of individual liberty as its highest goal, Strauss felt that there should be a greater interest in the problem of human excellence and political virtue. Through his writings, Strauss repeatedly raised the question of how and to what extent freedom and excellence can coexist. Strauss refused to provide any straightforward answer to the Socratic question: What is the good for the city and man?

=== Encounters with Carl Schmitt and Alexandre Kojève ===
Two significant political-philosophical dialogues Strauss had with living thinkers were those he held with Carl Schmitt and Alexandre Kojève. Schmitt, who would later, for a short time, become the chief jurist of Nazi Germany, was one of the first important German academics to review Strauss's early work positively. Schmitt's positive reference for and approval of Strauss's work on Hobbes was instrumental in winning Strauss the scholarship funding that allowed him to leave Germany.

According to Heinrich Meier's interpretation, Strauss's critique and clarifications of The Concept of the Political led Schmitt to make significant emendations in its second edition. Writing to Schmitt in 1932, Strauss summarised Schmitt's political theology that "because man is by nature evil, he, therefore, needs dominion. But dominion can be established, that is, men can be unified only in a unity against—against other men. Every association of men is necessarily a separation from other men ... the political thus understood is not the constitutive principle of the state, of order, but a condition of the state." But Robert Howse argues that there is no clear evidence to support these claims and that the relationship between them was merely professional.

Strauss, however, directly opposed Schmitt's position. For Strauss, Schmitt, and his return to Hobbes helpfully clarified the nature of our political existence and our modern self-understanding. Schmitt's position was therefore symptomatic of the modern-era liberal self-understanding. Strauss believed that such an analysis, as in Hobbes's time, served as a useful "preparatory action," revealing our contemporary orientation towards the eternal problems of politics (social existence). However, Strauss believed that Schmitt's reification of our modern self-understanding of the problem of politics into a political theology was not an adequate solution. Strauss instead advocated a return to a broader classical understanding of human nature and to political philosophy, in the tradition of the ancient philosophers.

With Kojève, Strauss had a close and lifelong philosophical friendship. They had first met as students in Berlin. The two thinkers shared boundless philosophical respect for each other. Kojève would later write that, without befriending Strauss, "I never would have known ... what philosophy is". The political-philosophical dispute between Kojève and Strauss centered on the role that philosophy should and can be allowed to play in politics.

Kojève, a senior civil servant in the French government, was instrumental in the creation of the European Economic Community. He argued that philosophers should have an active role in shaping political events. Strauss, on the contrary, believed that philosophers should play a role in politics only to the extent that they can ensure that philosophy, which he saw as humanity's highest activity, can be free from political intervention.

=== Liberalism and nihilism ===
Strauss argued that liberalism in its modern form (which is oriented toward universal freedom as opposed to "ancient liberalism" which is oriented toward human excellence), contained within it an intrinsic tendency towards extreme relativism, which in turn led to two types of nihilism:

- The first was a "brutal" nihilism, expressed in Nazi and Bolshevik regimes. In On Tyranny, he wrote that these ideologies, both descendants of Enlightenment thought, tried to destroy all traditions, history, ethics, and moral standards and replace them by force under which nature and humanity are subjugated and conquered.
- The second type—the "gentle" nihilism expressed in Western liberal democracies—was a kind of value-free aimlessness and a hedonistic "permissive egalitarianism," which he saw as permeating the fabric of contemporary American society.

In the belief that 20th-century relativism, scientism, historicism, and nihilism were all implicated in the deterioration of modern society and philosophy, Strauss sought to uncover the philosophical pathways that had led to this situation. The resultant study led him to advocate a tentative return to classical political philosophy as a starting point for judging political action.

=== Interpretation of Plato's Republic ===
According to Strauss, the Republic by Plato is not "a blueprint for regime reform" (a play on words from Karl Popper's The Open Society and Its Enemies, which attacks The Republic for being just that). Strauss quotes Cicero: "The Republic does not bring to light the best possible regime but rather the nature of political things—the nature of the city."

Strauss argued that the city-in-speech was unnatural, precisely because "it is rendered possible by the abstraction from eros". Though skeptical of "progress," Strauss was equally skeptical about political agendas of "return"—that is, going backward instead of forward. In fact, he was consistently suspicious of anything claiming to be a solution to an old political or philosophical problem. He spoke of the danger in trying finally to resolve the debate between rationalism and traditionalism in politics. In particular, along with many in the pre-World War II German Right, he feared people trying to force a world state into being in the future, believing it would inevitably become a tyranny. Hence, he kept his distance from the two totalitarianisms that he denounced in his century, both fascists and communists.

=== Strauss and Karl Popper ===
Strauss rejected Karl Popper's views as illogical. Eric Voegelin agreed, sending a letter in response to Strauss's request to look into the issue. In the response, Voegelin wrote that studying Popper's views was a waste of precious time and "an annoyance". Specifically about The Open Society and Its Enemies and Popper's understanding of Plato's The Republic, after giving some examples, Voegelin wrote:

Popper is philosophically so uncultured, so fully a primitive ideological brawler, that he is not able even approximately to reproduce correctly the contents of one page of Plato. Reading is of no use to him; he is too lacking in knowledge to understand what the author says.

Strauss proceeded to show this letter to Kurt Riezler, who used his influence to oppose Popper's appointment at the University of Chicago.

=== Ancients and Moderns ===
Strauss constantly stressed the importance of two dichotomies in political philosophy: Athens and Jerusalem (reason and revelation), and Ancient versus Modern. The "Ancients" were the Socratic philosophers and their intellectual heirs; the "Moderns" start with Niccolò Machiavelli. The contrast between Ancients and Moderns was understood as stemming from the irresolvable tension between Reason and Revelation. The Socratics, reacting to the first Greek philosophers, brought philosophy back to earth and, hence, back to the marketplace, making it more political.

The Moderns reacted to the dominance of revelation in medieval society by promoting the possibilities of Reason. They objected to Aquinas's merger of natural right and natural theology, for it made natural right vulnerable to sideshow theological disputes. Thomas Hobbes, under the influence of Francis Bacon, re-oriented political thought to what was most solid but also most low in man—his physical hopes and fears—setting a precedent for John Locke and the later economic approach to political thought, as in David Hume and Adam Smith.

=== Strauss and Zionism ===
As a youth, Strauss belonged to the German Zionist youth group, along with his friends Gershom Scholem and Walter Benjamin. Both were admirers of Strauss and would remain so throughout their lives. When he was 17, as he said, he was "converted" to political Zionism as a follower of Ze'ev Jabotinsky. He wrote several essays about its controversies, but left these activities behind by his early twenties. While Strauss maintained a sympathetic interest in Zionism, he later came to refer to Zionism as "problematic" and became disillusioned with some of its aims.

Strauss taught at the Hebrew University of Jerusalem during the 1954–55 academic year. In his letter to a National Review editor, Strauss asked why Israel had been called a racist state by one of their writers. He argued that the author did not provide sufficient evidence for his claim. He ended his essay with this statement: "Political Zionism is problematic for obvious reasons. But I can never forget what it achieved as a moral force in an era of complete dissolution. It helped to stem the tide of 'progressive' leveling of venerable, ancestral differences; it fulfilled a conservative function."

=== Religious belief ===
Although Strauss accepted the utility of religious belief, there is some question about his religious views. He was openly disdainful of atheism and disapproved of contemporary "dogmatic disbelief", which he considered intemperate and irrational. However, like Thomas Aquinas, he felt that revelation must be subject to examination by reason. At the end of The City and Man, Strauss invites the reader to "be open to ... the question quid sit deus ["What is God?"]" (p. 241). Edward Feser writes that "Strauss was not himself an orthodox believer, neither was he a convinced atheist. Since whether or not to accept a purported divine revelation is itself one of the 'permanent' questions, orthodoxy must always remain an option equally as defensible as unbelief."

In Natural Right and History, Strauss distinguishes a Socratic (Platonic, Ciceronian, Aristotelian) from a conventionalist (materialistic, Epicurean) reading of divinity, and argues that "the question of religion" (what is religion?) is inseparable from the question of the nature of civil society and civil authority. Throughout the volume, he argues for the Socratic reading of civil authority and rejects the conventionalist reading (which includes atheism as an essential component). This is incompatible with interpretations by Shadia Drury and other scholars who argue that Strauss viewed religion purely instrumentally.

== Reception and legacy ==
=== Reception by contemporaries ===
Strauss's works were read and admired by thinkers as diverse as the philosophers Gershom Scholem, Walter Benjamin, Hans-Georg Gadamer, and Alexandre Kojève, and the psychoanalyst Jacques Lacan. Benjamin had become acquainted with Strauss as a student in Berlin, and expressed admiration for Strauss throughout his life. Gadamer stated that he 'largely agreed' with Strauss's interpretations.

=== The Straussian school ===
Straussianism is the name given "to denote the research methods, common concepts, theoretical presuppositions, central questions, and pedagogic style (teaching style) characteristic of the large number of conservatives who have been influenced by the thought and teaching of Leo Strauss". While it "is particularly influential among university professors of historical political theory ... it also sometimes serves as a common intellectual framework more generally among conservative activists, think tank professionals, and public intellectuals". Harvey Mansfield, Steven B. Smith and Steven Berg, though never students of Strauss, are "Straussians" (as some followers of Strauss identify themselves). Mansfield has argued that there is no such thing as "Straussianism", yet there are Straussians and a school of Straussians. Mansfield describes the school as "open to the whole of philosophy" and as lacking any definite doctrines one must believe to belong to it.

Within the discipline of political theory, the method calls for its practitioners to use "a 'close reading' of the 'Great Books' of political thought; they strive to understand a thinker 'as he understood himself'; they are unconcerned with questions about the historical context of, or historical influences on, a given author" and strive to be open to the idea that they may find something timelessly true in a great book. The approach "resembles in important ways the old New Criticism in literary studies."

There is some controversy in the approach over what distinguishes a great book from lesser works. Great books are held to be written by authors/philosophers "of such sovereign critical self-knowledge and intellectual power that they can in no way be reduced to the general thought of their time and place," with other works "understood as epiphenomenal to the original insights of a thinker of the first rank". This approach is seen as a counter "to the historicist presuppositions of the mid-twentieth century, which read the history of political thought in a progressivist way, with past philosophies forever cut off from us in a superseded past." Straussianism puts forward the possibility that past thinkers may have "hold of the truth—and that more recent thinkers are therefore wrong."

=== The Chinese Straussians ===
Almost all of Strauss's writings have been translated into Chinese. There is even a school of Straussians in China, the most prominent being Liu Xiaofeng (Renmin University) and Gan Yang. "Chinese Straussians" (who are often also fascinated by Carl Schmitt) exemplify the hybridization of Western political theory in a non-Western context. As the editors of a recent volume write, "the reception of Schmitt and Strauss in the Chinese-speaking world (and especially in the People's Republic of China) not only says much about how Schmitt and Strauss can be read today, but also provides important clues about the deeper contradictions of Western modernity and the dilemmas of non-liberal societies in our increasingly contentious world."

=== Criticism ===
==== Accusations of elitism ====
Some critics of Strauss have accused him of being elitist, illiberal and anti-democratic. Journalists such as Seymour Hersh have opined that Strauss endorsed noble lies, "myths used by political leaders seeking to maintain a cohesive society". In The City and Man, Strauss discusses the myths outlined in Plato's Republic that are required for all governments. These include the belief that the state's land belongs to it, even if it was acquired illegitimately, and that citizenship is rooted in more than accidents of birth.

Shadia Drury, in Leo Strauss and the American Right (1999), claimed that Strauss inculcated an elitist strain in American political leaders linked to imperialist militarism, neoconservatism and Christian fundamentalism. Drury argues that Strauss teaches that "perpetual deception of the citizens by those in power is critical because they need to be led, and they need strong rulers to tell them what's good for them".

==== Anti-historicism ====
Strauss has also been criticized by some conservatives. According to Claes G. Ryn, Strauss's anti-historicist thinking creates an artificial contrast between moral universality and "the conventional", "the ancestral", and "the historical". Strauss, Ryn argues, wrongly and reductively assumes that respect for tradition must undermine reason and universality. Contrary to Strauss's criticism of Edmund Burke, the historical sense may be indispensable to an adequate apprehension of universality. Strauss's abstract, ahistorical conception of natural right distorts genuine universality, Ryn contends. Strauss does not consider the possibility that real universality becomes known to human beings in a concretized, particular form. Strauss and the Straussians have paradoxically taught philosophically unsuspecting American conservatives, not least Catholic intellectuals, to reject tradition in favor of ahistorical theorizing. This bias flies in the face of the central Christian notion of the Incarnation, which represents a synthesis of the universal and the historical. According to Ryn, the propagation of a purely abstract idea of universality has contributed to the neoconservative advocacy of allegedly universal American principles, which neoconservatives see as justification for American intervention around the world—bringing the blessings of the "West" to the benighted "rest". Strauss's anti-historical thinking connects him and his followers with the French Jacobins, who also regarded tradition as incompatible with virtue and rationality.

What Ryn calls the "new Jacobinism" of the "neoconservative" philosophy is, writes Paul Gottfried, also the rhetoric of Louis Antoine de Saint-Just and Leon Trotsky, which the philosophically impoverished American Right has taken over with mindless alacrity; Republican operators and think tanks apparently believe they can carry the electorate by appealing to yesterday's leftist clichés.

==== Response to criticism ====
In his 2009 book Straussophobia, Peter Minowitz provides a detailed critique of Drury, Xenos, and other critics of Strauss whom he accuses of "bigotry and buffoonery".

In Reading Leo Strauss, Steven B. Smith rejects the link between Strauss and neoconservative thought, arguing that Strauss was never personally active in politics, never endorsed imperialism, and questioned the utility of political philosophy for the practice of politics. In particular, Strauss argued that Plato's myth of the philosopher king should be read as a reductio ad absurdum, and that philosophers should understand politics not to influence policy but to ensure philosophy's autonomy from politics. In his review of Reading Leo Strauss, Robert Alter writes that Smith "persuasively sets the record straight on Strauss's political views and on what his writing is really about".

Strauss's daughter, Jenny Strauss Clay, defended him against the charge that he was the "mastermind behind the neoconservative ideologues who control United States foreign policy." "He was a conservative", she says, "insofar as he did not think change is necessarily change for the better." Since contemporary academia "leaned to the left", with its "unquestioned faith in progress and science combined with a queasiness regarding any kind of moral judgment", Strauss stood outside of the academic consensus. Had academia leaned to the right, he would have questioned it, too—and on certain occasions did question the tenets of the right.

Mark Lilla has argued that attributing neoconservative views to Strauss contradicts a careful reading of Strauss' actual texts, in particular On Tyranny. Lilla summarizes Strauss as follows:

Philosophy must always be aware of the dangers of tyranny, as a threat to both political decency and the philosophical life. It must understand enough about politics to defend its own autonomy, without falling into the error of thinking that philosophy can shape the political world according to its own lights.

Responding to charges that Strauss's teachings fostered the neoconservative foreign policy of the administration of George W. Bush, such as "unrealistic hopes for the spread of liberal democracy through military conquest", Nathan Tarcov, director of the Leo Strauss Center at the University of Chicago, asserts that Strauss as a political philosopher was essentially non-political. After an exegesis of the very limited practical political views to be gleaned from Strauss's writings, Tarcov concludes that "Strauss can remind us of the permanent problems, but we have only ourselves to blame for our faulty solutions to the problems of today."

== Bibliography ==
Books and articles

- Gesammelte Schriften. Ed. Heinrich Meier. Stuttgart: J. B. Metzler, 1996. Four vols. published to date: Vol. 1, Die Religionskritik Spinozas und zugehörige Schriften (rev. ed. 2001); vol. 2, Philosophie und Gesetz, Frühe Schriften (1997); Vol. 3, Hobbes' politische Wissenschaft und zugehörige Schrifte – Briefe (2001); Vol. 4, Politische Philosophie. Studien zum theologisch-politischen Problem (2010). The full series will also include Vol. 5, Über Tyrannis (2013) and Vol. 6, Gedanken über Machiavelli. Deutsche Erstübersetzung (2014).
- Leo Strauss: The Early Writings (1921–1932). (Trans. from parts of Gesammelte Schriften). Trans. Michael Zank. Albany: SUNY Press, 2002.
- Die Religionskritik Spinozas als Grundlage seiner Bibelwissenschaft: Untersuchungen zu Spinozas Theologisch-politischem Traktat. Berlin: Akademie-Verlag, 1930.
  - Spinoza's Critique of Religion. (English trans. by Elsa M. Sinclair of Die Religionskritik Spinozas, 1930.) With a new English preface and a trans. of Strauss's 1932 German essay on Carl Schmitt. New York: Schocken, 1965. Reissued without that essay, Chicago: U of Chicago P, 1997.
- "Anmerkungen zu Carl Schmitt, Der Begriff des Politischen". Archiv für Sozialwissenschaft und Sozialpolitik 67, no. 6 (August–September 1932): 732–49.
  - "Comments on Carl Schmitt's Begriff des Politischen". (English trans. by Elsa M. Sinclair of "Anmerkungen zu Carl Schmitt", 1932.) 331–51 in Spinoza's Critique of Religion, 1965. Reprinted in Carl Schmitt, The Concept of the Political, ed. and trans. George Schwab. New Brunswick, NJ: Rutgers U Press, 1976.
  - "Notes on Carl Schmitt, The Concept of the Political". (English trans. by J. Harvey Lomax of "Anmerkungen zu Carl Schmitt", 1932.) In Heinrich Meier, Carl Schmitt and Leo Strauss: The Hidden Dialogue, trans. J. Harvey Lomax. Chicago: U of Chicago P, 1995. Reprinted in Carl Schmitt, The Concept of the Political, ed. and trans. George Schwab. Chicago: U of Chicago P, 1996, 2007.
- Philosophie und Gesetz: Beiträge zum Verständnis Maimunis und seiner Vorläufer. Berlin: Schocken, 1935.
  - Philosophy and Law: Essays Toward the Understanding of Maimonides and His Predecessors. (English trans. by Fred Baumann of Philosophie und Gesetz, 1935.) Philadelphia: Jewish Publication Society, 1987.
  - Philosophy and Law: Contributions to the Understanding of Maimonides and His Predecessors. (English trans. with introd. by Eve Adler of Philosophie und Gesetz, 1935.) Albany: SUNY Press, 1995.
- The Political Philosophy of Hobbes: Its Basis and Its Genesis. (English trans. by Elsa M. Sinclair from German manuscript.) Oxford: Clarendon Press, 1936. Reissued with new preface, Chicago: U of Chicago P, 1952.
  - Hobbes' politische Wissenschaft in ihrer Genesis. (1935 German original of The Political Philosophy of Hobbes, 1936.) Neuwied am Rhein: Hermann Luchterhand, 1965.
- "The Spirit of Sparta or the Taste of Xenophon". Social Research 6, no. 4 (Winter 1939): 502–36.
- "On German Nihilism" (1999, originally a 1941 lecture), Interpretation 26, no. 3 edited by David Janssens and Daniel Tanguay.
- "Farabi's Plato" American Academy for Jewish Research, Louis Ginzberg Jubilee Volume, 1945. 45 pp.
- "On a New Interpretation of Plato's Political Philosophy". Social Research 13, no. 3 (Fall 1946): 326–67.
- "On the Intention of Rousseau". Social Research 14, no. 4 (Winter 1947): 455–87.
- On Tyranny: An Interpretation of Xenophon's Hiero. Foreword by Alvin Johnson. New York: Political Science Classics, 1948. Reissued Glencoe, Ill.: The Free Press, 1950.
  - De la tyrannie. (French trans. of On Tyranny, 1948, with "Restatement on Xenophon's Hiero" and Alexandre Kojève's "Tyranny and Wisdom".) Paris: Librairie Gallimard, 1954.
  - On Tyranny. (English edition of De la tyrannie, 1954.) Ithaca: Cornell UP, 1963.
  - On Tyranny. (Revised and expanded edition of On Tyranny, 1963.) Includes Strauss–Kojève correspondence. Ed. Victor Gourevitch and Michael S. Roth. New York: The Free Press, 1991.
- "On Collingwood's Philosophy of History". Review of Metaphysics 5, no. 4 (June 1952): 559–86.
- Persecution and the Art of Writing. Glencoe, Ill.: The Free Press, 1952. Reissued Chicago: U of Chicago P, 1988.
- Natural Right and History. (Based on the 1949 Walgreen lectures.) Chicago: U of Chicago P, 1953. Reprinted with new preface, 1971. ISBN 978-0-226-77694-1.
- "Existentialism" (1956), a public lecture on Martin Heidegger's thought, published in Interpretation, Spring 1995, Vol.22 No. 3: 303–18.
- Seminar on Plato's Republic, (1957 Lecture), (1961 Lecture). University of Chicago.
- Thoughts on Machiavelli. Glencoe, Ill.: The Free Press, 1958. Reissued Chicago: U of Chicago P, 1978.
- What Is Political Philosophy? and Other Studies. Glencoe, Ill.: The Free Press, 1959. Reissued Chicago: U of Chicago Press, 1988.
- On Plato's Symposium [1959]. Ed. Seth Benardete. (Edited transcript of 1959 lectures.) Chicago: U of Chicago P, 2001.
- "'Relativism'". 135–57 in Helmut Schoeck and James W. Wiggins, eds., Relativism and the Study of Man. Princeton: D. Van Nostrand, 1961. Partial reprint, 13–26 in The Rebirth of Classical Political Rationalism, 1989.
- History of Political Philosophy. Co-editor with Joseph Cropsey. Chicago: U of Chicago P, 1963 (1st ed.), 1972 (2nd ed.), 1987 (3rd ed.).
- "The Crisis of Our Time", 41–54, and "The Crisis of Political Philosophy", 91–103, in Howard Spaeth, ed., The Predicament of Modern Politics. Detroit: U of Detroit P, 1964.
  - "Political Philosophy and the Crisis of Our Time". (Adaptation of the two essays in Howard Spaeth, ed., The Predicament of Modern Politics, 1964.) 217–42 in George J. Graham Jr., and George W. Carey, eds., The Post-Behavioral Era: Perspectives on Political Science. New York: David McKay, 1972.
- The City and Man. (Based on the 1962 Page-Barbour lectures.) Chicago: Rand McNally, 1964.
- Socrates and Aristophanes. New York: Basic Books, 1966. Reissued Chicago: U of Chicago P, 1980.
- Liberalism Ancient and Modern. New York: Basic Books, 1968. Reissued with foreword by Allan Bloom, 1989. Reissued Chicago: U of Chicago P, 1995.
- Xenophon's Socratic Discourse: An Interpretation of the Oeconomicus. Ithaca: Cornell UP, 1970.
- Note on the Plan of Nietzsche's "Beyond Good & Evil". St. John's College, 1971.
- Xenophon's Socrates. Ithaca: Cornell UP, 1972.
- The Argument and the Action of Plato's Laws. Chicago: U of Chicago P, 1975.
- Political Philosophy: Six Essays by Leo Strauss. Ed. Hilail Gilden. Indianapolis: Bobbs-Merrill, 1975.
  - An Introduction to Political Philosophy: Ten Essays by Leo Strauss. (Expanded version of Political Philosophy: Six Essays by Leo Strauss, 1975.) Ed. Hilail Gilden. Detroit: Wayne State UP, 1989.
- Studies in Platonic Political Philosophy. Introd. by Thomas L. Pangle. Chicago: U of Chicago P, 1983.
- The Rebirth of Classical Political Rationalism: An Introduction to the Thought of Leo Strauss – Essays and Lectures by Leo Strauss. Ed. Thomas L. Pangle. Chicago: U of Chicago P, 1989.
- Faith and Political Philosophy: the Correspondence Between Leo Strauss and Eric Voegelin, 1934–1964. Ed. Peter Emberley and Barry Cooper. Introd. by Thomas L. Pangle. University Park, PA: The Pennsylvania State UP, 1993.
- Hobbes's Critique of Religion and Related Writings. Ed. and trans. Gabriel Bartlett and Svetozar Minkov. Chicago: U of Chicago P, 2011. (Trans. of materials first published in the Gesammelte Schriften, Vol. 3, including an unfinished manuscript by Leo Strauss of a book on Hobbes, written in 1933–1934, and some shorter related writings.)
- Leo Strauss on Moses Mendelssohn. Edited and translated by Martin D. Yaffe. Chicago: University of Chicago Press, 2012. (Annotated translation of ten introductions written by Strauss to a multi-volume critical edition of Mendelssohn's work.)
- "Exoteric Teaching" (Critical Edition by Hannes Kerber). In Reorientation: Leo Strauss in the 1930s. Edited by Martin D. Yaffe and Richard S. Ruderman. New York: Palgrave, 2014, pp. 275–86.
- "Lecture Notes for 'Persecution and the Art of Writing'" (Critical Edition by Hannes Kerber). In Reorientation: Leo Strauss in the 1930s. Edited by Martin D. Yaffe and Richard S. Ruderman. New York: Palgrave, 2014, pp. 293–304.
- Leo Strauss on Nietzsche's "Thus Spoke Zarathustra". Edited by Richard L. Velkley. Chicago: University of Chicago Press, 2017.
- Leo Strauss on Political Philosophy: Responding to the Challenge of Positivism and Historicism. Edited by Catherine H. Zuckert. Chicago: University of Chicago Press, 2018.
- Leo Strauss on Hegel. Edited by Paul Franco. Chicago: University of Chicago Press, 2019.

Writings about Maimonides and Jewish philosophy

- Spinoza's Critique of Religion (see above, 1930).
- Philosophy and Law (see above, 1935).
- "Quelques remarques sur la science politique de Maïmonide et de Farabi". Revue des études juives 100 (1936): 1–37.
- "Der Ort der Vorsehungslehre nach der Ansicht Maimunis". Monatschrift für Geschichte und Wissenschaft des Judentums 81 (1936): 448–56.
- "The Literary Character of The Guide for the Perplexed" [1941]. 38–94 in Persecution and the Art of Writing. Chicago: U of Chicago P, 1952.
- [1944] "How to Study Medieval Philosophy" [. Interpretation 23, no. 3 (Spring 1996): 319–338. Previously published, less annotations and fifth paragraph, as "How to Begin to Study Medieval Philosophy" in Pangle (ed.), The Rebirth of Classical Political Rationalism, 1989 (see above).
- [1952]. Modern Judaism 1, no. 1 (May 1981): 17–45. Reprinted Chap. 1 (I–II) in Jewish Philosophy and the Crisis of Modernity, 1997 (see below).
- [1952]. Independent Journal of Philosophy 3 (1979), 111–18. Reprinted Chap. 1 (III) in Jewish Philosophy and the Crisis of Modernity, 1997 (see below).
- "Maimonides' Statement on Political Science". Proceedings of the American Academy for Jewish Research 22 (1953): 115–30.
- [1957]. L'Homme 21, n° 1 (janvier–mars 1981): 5–20. Reprinted Chap. 8 in Jewish Philosophy and the Crisis of Modernity, 1997 (see below).
- "How to Begin to Study The Guide of the Perplexed". In The Guide of the Perplexed, Volume One. Trans. Shlomo Pines. Chicago: U of Chicago P, 1963.
- [1965] "On the Plan of the Guide of the Perplexed" . Harry Austryn Wolfson Jubilee. Volume (Jerusalem: American Academy for Jewish Research), pp. 775–91.
- "Notes on Maimonides' Book of Knowledge". 269–83 in Studies in Mysticism and Religion Presented to G. G. Scholem. Jerusalem: Magnes Press, 1967.
- Jewish Philosophy and the Crisis of Modernity: Essays and Lectures in Modern Jewish Thought. Ed. Kenneth Hart Green. Albany: SUNY P, 1997.
- Leo Strauss on Maimonides: The Complete Writings. Edited by Kenneth Hart Green. Chicago: University of Chicago Press, 2013.

== See also ==
- American philosophy
- List of American philosophers
- Neoconservatism, often referred to as inspired by the work of Strauss
- Lev Shestov
- Allan Bloom
- Seth Benardete
- Jacob Klein
