= Carl Schmitt bibliography =

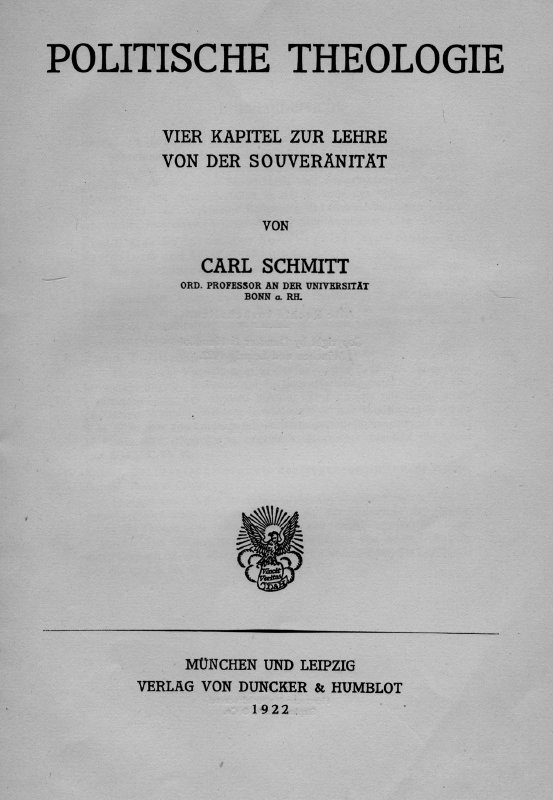
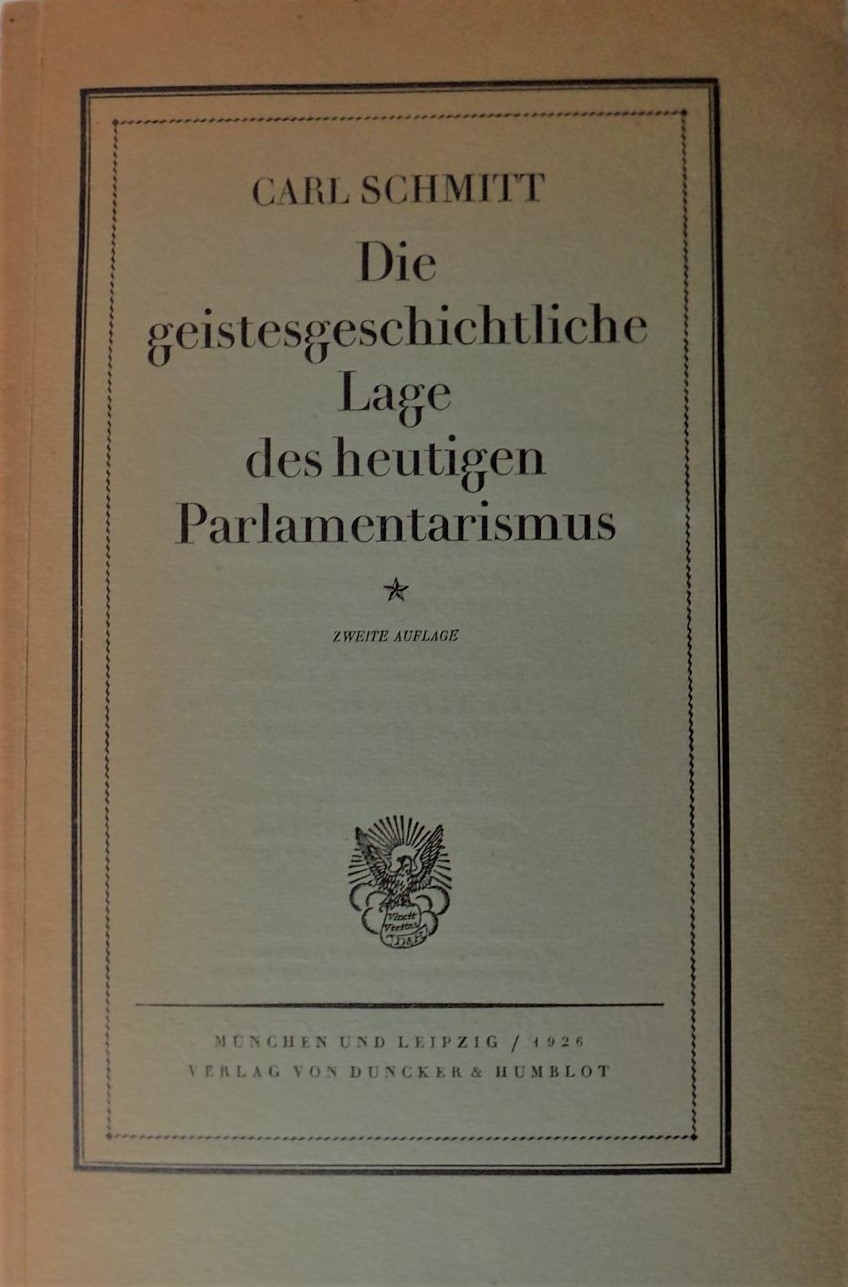
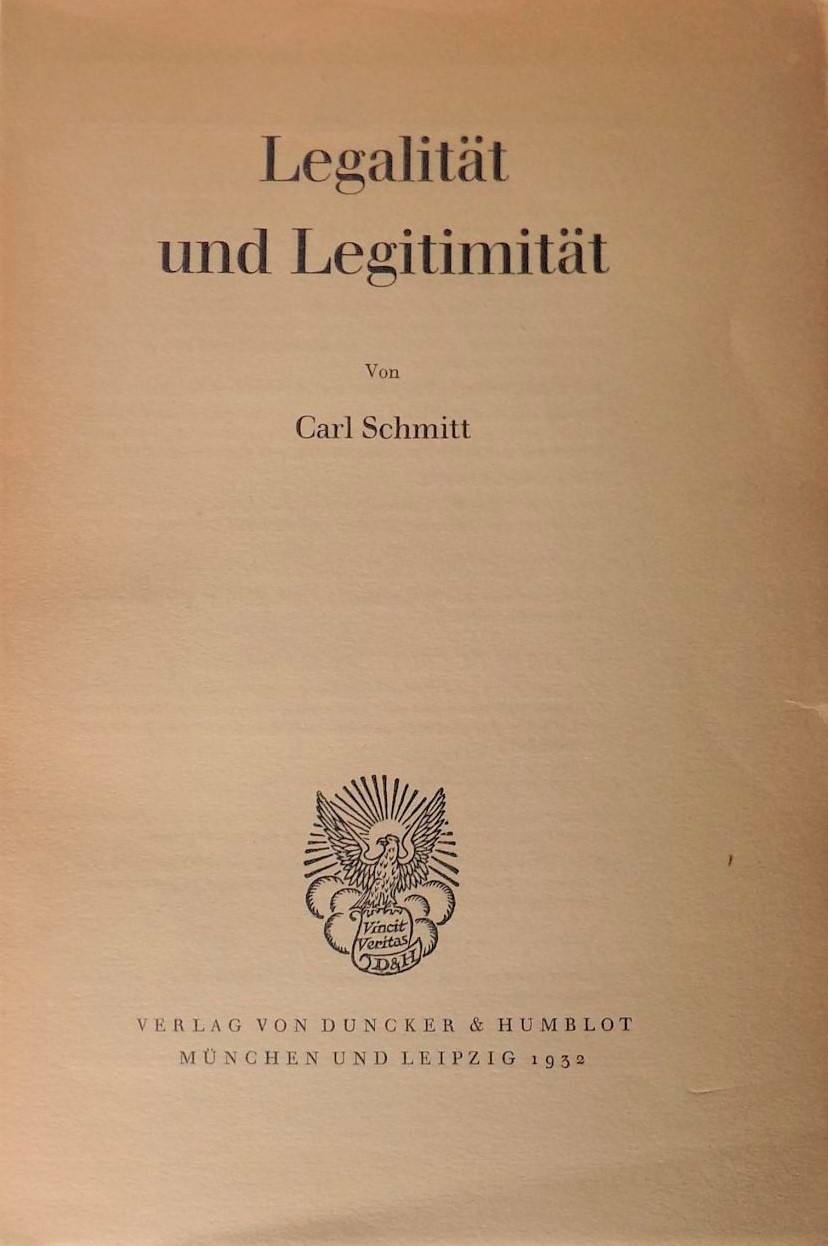
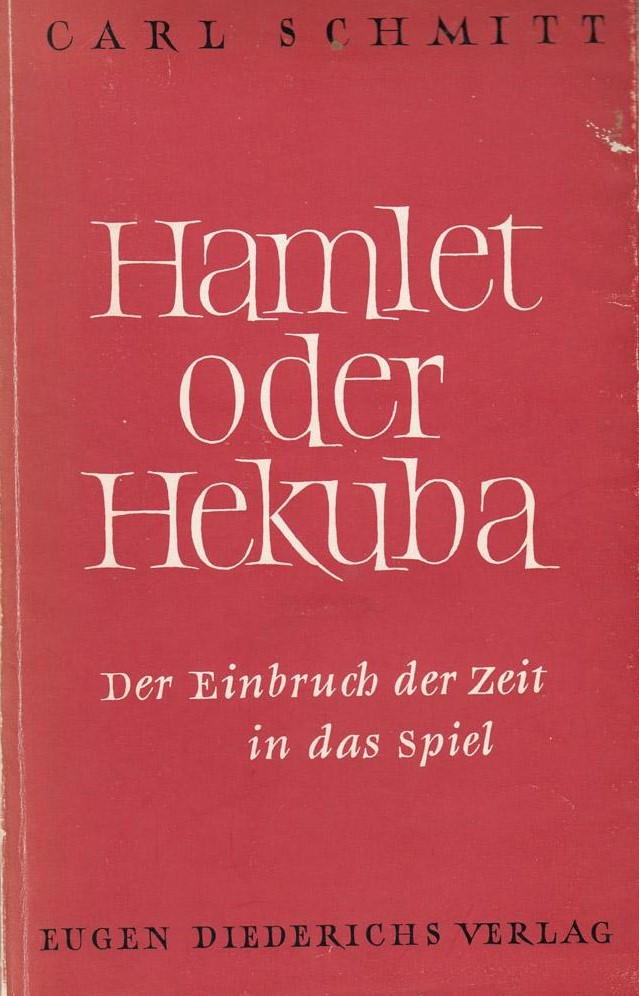
German covers and title pages of some of Schmitt's books

Carl Schmitt (11 July 1888 – 7 April 1985) was a German jurist and political philosopher.

== Works in German ==
Schmitt wrote the following books.

- Über Schuld und Schuldarten. Eine terminologische Untersuchung, 1910.
- Gesetz und Urteil. Eine Untersuchung zum Problem der Rechtspraxis, 1912.
- Schattenrisse (published under the pseudonym "Johannes Negelinus, mox Doctor", in collaboration with Dr. Fritz Eisler), 1913.
- Der Wert des Staates und die Bedeutung des Einzelnen, 1914.
- Theodor Däublers 'Nordlicht': Drei Studien über die Elemente, den Geist und die Aktualität des Werkes, 1916.
- Die Buribunken, in: Summa 1/1917/18, 89 ff.
- Politische Romantik, 1919.
- Die Diktatur. Von den Anfängen des modernen Souveränitätsgedankens bis zum proletarischen Klassenkampf, 1921.
- Politische Theologie. Vier Kapitel zur Lehre von der Souveränität, 1922.
- Die geistesgeschichtliche Lage des heutigen Parlamentarismus, 1923.
- Römischer Katholizismus und politische Form, 1923.
- Die Rheinlande als Objekt internationaler Politik, 1925.
- Die Kernfrage des Völkerbundes, 1926.
- Der Begriff des Politischen, in: Archiv für Sozialwissenschaft und Sozialpolitik vol. 58, no. 1, 1927, 1–33.
- Volksentscheid und Volksbegehren. Ein Beitrag zur Auslegung der Weimarer Verfassung und zur Lehre von der unmittelbaren Demokratie, 1927.
- Verfassungslehre, 1928.
- Hugo Preuß. Sein Staatsbegriff und seine Stellung in der dt. Rechtslehre, 1930.
- Der Völkerbund und das politische Problem der Friedenssicherung, 1930, 2., erw. Aufl. 1934.
- Der Hüter der Verfassung, 1931.
- Der Begriff des Politischen, 1932 (elaboration of the 1927 essay).
- Legalität und Legitimität, 1932.
- Starker Staat und gesunde Wirtschaft, 1933
- Staat, Bewegung, Volk. Die Dreigliederung der politischen Einheit, 1933.
- Das Reichsstatthaltergesetz, 1933.
- Der Führer schützt das Recht, 1934.
- Staatsgefüge und Zusammenbruch des Zweiten Reiches. Der Sieg des Bürgers über den Soldaten, 1934.
- Über die drei Arten des rechtswissenschaftlichen Denkens, 1934.
- Der Staat als Mechanismus bei Hobbes und Descartes, 1936.
- Der Leviathan in der Staatslehre des Thomas Hobbes, 1938.
- Die Wendung zum diskriminierenden Kriegsbegriff, 1938.
- Völkerrechtliche Großraumordnung mit Interventionsverbot für raumfremde Mächte. Ein Beitrag zum Reichsbegriff im Völkerrecht, 1939.
- Positionen und Begriffe im Kampf mit Weimar – Genf – Versailles 1923–1939, 1940 (collection of essays).
- Land und Meer. Eine weltgeschichtliche Betrachtung, 1942.
- Der Nomos der Erde im Völkerrecht des Jus Publicum Europaeum, 1950.
- Donoso Cortes in gesamteuropäischer Interpretation, 1950.
- Ex captivitate salus. Erinnerungen der Zeit 1945/47, 1950.
- Die Lage der europäischen Rechtswissenschaft, 1950.
- Das Gespräch über die Macht und den Zugang zum Machthaber, 1954.
- Hamlet oder Hekuba. Der Einbruch der Zeit in das Spiel, 1956.
- Verfassungsrechtliche Aufsätze aus den Jahren 1924–1954, 1958 (collection of essays).
- Theorie des Partisanen. Zwischenbemerkung zum Begriff des Politischen, 1963.
- Politische Theologie II. Die Legende von der Erledigung jeder Politischen Theologie, 1970.
- Glossarium. Aufzeichnungen der Jahre 1947–1951, edited by Eberhard Freiherr von Medem, 1991 (posthum).
- Das internationale Verbrechen des Angriffskrieges, edited by Helmut Quaritsch, 1993 (posthum).
- Staat – Großraum – Nomos, edited by Günter Maschke, 1995 (posthum).
- Frieden oder Pazifismus? Edited by Günter Maschke, 2005 (posthum).
- Carl Schmitt: Tagebücher, edited by Ernst Hüsmert, 2003 ff. (posthum).

== English translations ==
The following editions of Schmitt's works have been published in English.

- The Concept of the Political. George D. Schwab, trans. (University of Chicago Press, 1996; expanded edition 2007, with an introduction by Tracy B. Strong). Original publication: 1st edn., Duncker & Humblot (Munich), 1932; 2nd edn., Duncker & Humblot (Berlin), 1963. (The 1932 text is an elaboration of a 1927 journal article of the same title.)
- Constitutional Theory. Jeffrey Seitzer, trans. (Duke University Press, 2007). Original publication: 1928.
- The Crisis of Parliamentary Democracy. Ellen Kennedy, trans. (MIT Press, 1988). Original publication: 1923, 2nd edn. 1926.
- Dictatorship. Michael Hoelzl and Graham Ward, trans. (Polity Press, 2014). Original publication: 1921, 2nd edn. 1928.
- Four Articles, 1931–1938. Simona Draghici, trans. (Plutarch Press, 1999). Originally published as part of Positionen und Begriffe im Kampf mit Weimar – Genf – Versailles, 1923–1939 (1940).
- Ex Captivitate Salus: Experiences, 1945 – 47. Matthew Hannah, trans. (Polity Press, 2017). Original publication: 1950.
- Hamlet or Hecuba: The Intrusion of the Time into the Play. David Pan and Jennifer R. Rust, trans. (Telos Press, 2009). Originally published 1956.
- The Idea of Representation: A Discussion. E. M. Codd, trans. (Plutarch Press, 1988), reprint of The Necessity of Politics (1931). Original publication: 1923.
- Land and Sea. Simona Draghici, trans. (Plutarch Press, 1997). Original publication: 1942.
- Legality and Legitimacy. Jeffrey Seitzer, trans. (Duke University Press, 2004). Original publication: 1932.
- The Leviathan in the State Theory of Thomas Hobbes: Meaning and Failure of a Political Symbol. George D. Schwab and Erna Hilfstein, trans. (Greenwood Press, 1996). Original publication: 1938.
- The Nomos of the Earth in the International Law of the Jus Publicum Europaeum. G. L. Ulmen, trans. (Telos Press, 2003). Original publication: 1950.
- On the Three Types of Juristic Thought. Joseph Bendersky, trans. (Praegar, 2004). Original publication: 1934.
- Political romanticism. Guy Oakes, trans. (MIT Press, 1986). Original publication: 1919, 2nd edn. 1925.
- Political Theology: Four Chapters on the Concept of Sovereignty. George D. Schwab, trans. (MIT Press, 1985 / University of Chicago Press; University of Chicago edition, 2004 with an Introduction by Tracy B. Strong. Original publication: 1922, 2nd edn. 1934.
- Roman Catholicism and Political Form. G. L. Ulmen, trans. (Greenwood Press, 1996). Original publication: 1923.
- State Composition and Collapse of the Second Reich. The Victory of the Bourgeois Citizen over the Soldier. Samuel Garrett Zeitlin, trans. Foreword by Reinhard Mehring. (Polity Press, 2026). Original publication: 1934.
- State, Movement, People (includes The Question of Legality). Simona Draghici, trans. (Plutarch Press, 2001). Original publication: Staat, Bewegung, Volk (1933); Das Problem der Legalität (1950).
- Theory of the Partisan. G. L. Ulmen, trans. (Telos Press, 2007). Original publication: 1963; 2nd ed. 1975.
- The Tyranny of Values. Simona Draghici, trans. (Plutarch Press, 1996). Original publication: 1979.
- War/Non-War: A Dilemma. Simona Draghici, trans. (Plutarch Press, 2004). Original publication: 1937.
