= Carl Schmitt Between Technological Rationality and Theology =

2020 book by Hugo Herrera

Carl Schmitt Between Technological Rationality and Theology: The Position and Meaning of His Legal Thought
- Author: Hugo E. Herrera
- Language: English
- Subject: Carl Schmitt, Political Philosophy
- Publisher: SUNY Press
- Publication date: 2020
- Publication place: Chile
- Media type: Print
- ISBN: 9781438478784

Carl Schmitt Between Technological Rationality and Theology: The Position and Meaning of His Legal Thought is a 2020 book by the Chilean philosopher Hugo E. Herrera. It presents a systematic interpretation of Carl Schmitt's legal thought, positioning it between technological rationality and theology.

== Summary ==
The book interprets Schmitt’s thought as a form of legal hermeneutics structured by the tension between universal norms and concrete situations. Herrera argues that rules and concepts are not fully determined prior to their application, but remain “preliminary indications, whose content is still indeterminate” (Herrera 2020, p. 87).

Understanding, therefore, cannot be reduced to subsumption, but requires an interpretive decision mediating between the universal and the particular.

== Discussion with Heinrich Meier ==
A central aspect of the book is its critical engagement with Heinrich Meier’s interpretation of Schmitt. Meier argues for a strict distinction between philosophy and theology, presenting political theology as grounded in a fundamental opposition between rational enquiry and revelation.

Herrera challenges this separation, arguing that transcendence may function as a condition for the elucidation of immanence. On this view, understanding presupposes reference to conditions that cannot be fully accounted for within purely immanent rationality (Herrera 2020, p. 62).

== Discussion with Derrida ==
The book also engages with positions associated with Jacques Derrida, particularly concerning the relation between rule and singularity. Herrera notes that each decision requires a unique interpretation not fully determined by general rules (Herrera 2020, p. 50).

== Significance and Reception ==
The book contributes to contemporary Schmitt scholarship by articulating the relation between “rule and case, norm and exception” as a fundamental structure of juridical understanding (Herrera 2020, p. 122). It further develops a critique of technological rationality, characterised by its “emphasis on the pole of the ideal and its manipulative aggressiveness” (Herrera 2020, p. 108).

The book has received attention in academic review literature. A review in Choice described it as “required reading for Schmitt scholars,” emphasizing that it provides a systematic analysis of Schmitt’s major works from a legal perspective. In academic scholarship, the book has been used as a secondary source in discussions of Schmitt’s legal and political thought. Eduardo Hernando Nieto (2021), in a study on constitutional justice and the Schmitt–Kelsen debate, refers to Herrera (2020) in reconstructing Schmitt’s theory of law. The book has also been included in broader international research on sovereignty and the state of exception. Anastasios Fountis (2023) lists Herrera’s work among contemporary scholarly contributions addressing Schmitt’s legacy in present-day political contexts.
