= Spheres trilogy =

Book trilogy by Peter Sloterdijk

Spheres
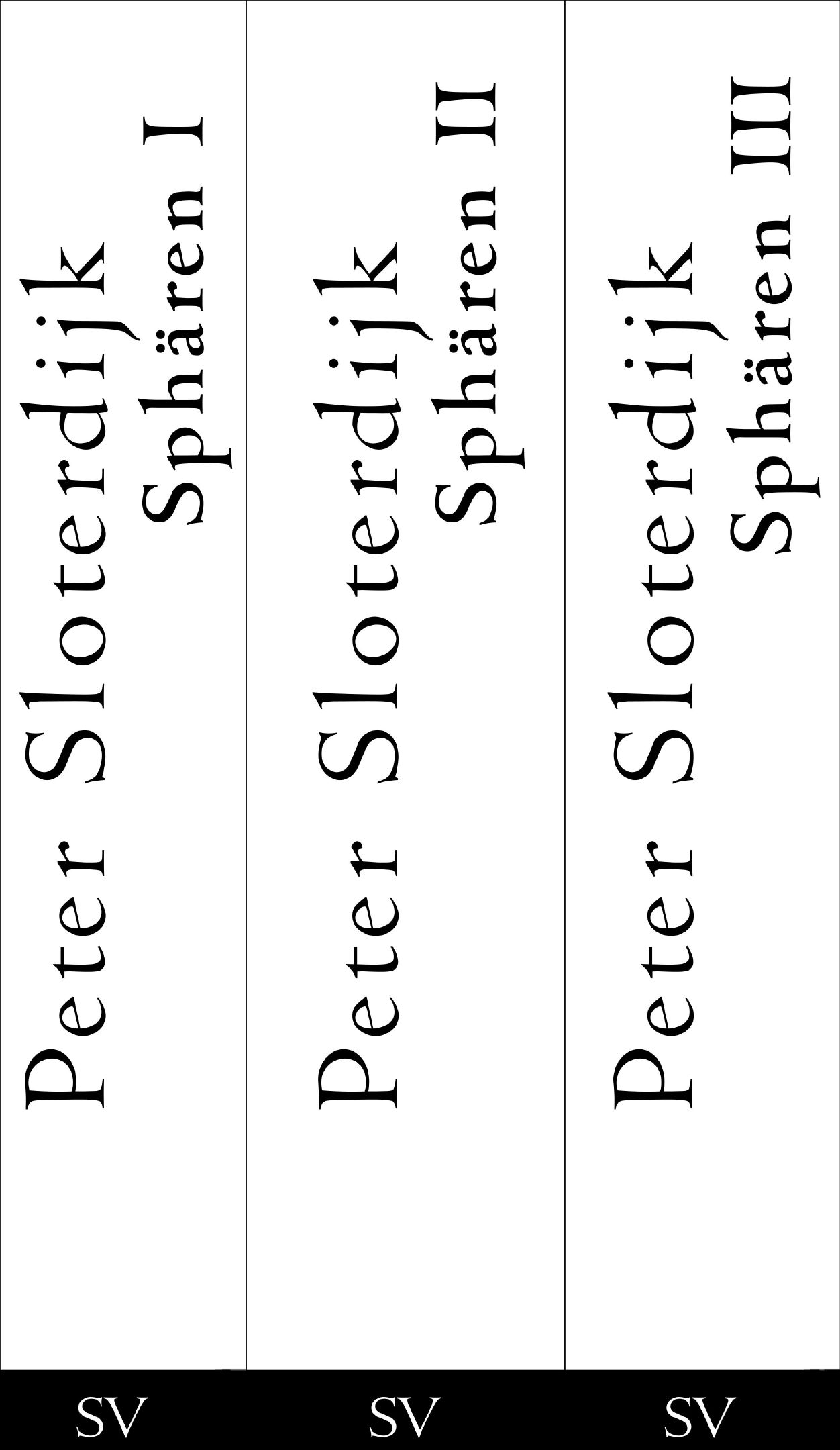
- Bubbles: Spheres Volume I: Microspherology (1998); Globes: Spheres Volume II: Macrospherology (1999); Foams: Spheres Volume III: Plural Spherology (2004)
- Author: Peter Sloterdijk
- Translator: Wieland Hoban
- Country: Germany
- Language: German
- Genre: Philosophy
- Publisher: Suhrkamp Verlag
- Published: 1998–2004
- Website: www.suhrkamp.de/buch/peter-sloterdijk-sphaeren-t-9783518414941

The Spheres trilogy (German: Sphären-Trilogie) is three books about the human conception of inhabited spaces, written by the German philosopher Peter Sloterdijk and titled Bubbles (1998), Globes (1999) and Foams (2004). The books were published in German by Suhrkamp Verlag and in English translation by Semiotext(e).

== Bubbles: Spheres Volume I: Microspherology ==
Bubbles: Spheres Volume I: Microspherology (German: Sphären. Mikrosphärologie. Band I. Blasen) was published by Suhrkamp Verlag in 1998. The original German version is 644 pages long. The book uses visual language to present a general theory about couplings, and how individuals are never alone because they always align themselves with the Other. It was published in English translation by Wieland Hoban through Semiotext(e) on 14 October 2011.

== Globes: Spheres Volume II: Macrospherology ==
Globes: Spheres Volume II: Macrospherology (German: Sphären. Makrosphärologie. Band II. Globen) was published by Suhrkamp Verlag in 1999. At 1013 pages, it is the longest book in the series and analyzes the philosophical foundations of the last 2000 years of human history, beginning with how the ancient Greeks represented the world as an orb and thereby began globalisation. The book was published in English translation by Wieland Hoban through Semiotext(e) on 10 October 2014.

== Foams: Spheres Volume III: Plural Spherology ==
Foams: Spheres Volume III: Plural Spherology (German: Sphären. Plurale Sphärologie. Band III. Schäume) was published by Suhrkamp Verlag in 2004 and is 916 pages long. Focusing on contemporary times, it analyzes how social bubbles are bound together to constitute a society, and moves into a theology where spatiality is at the centre. The book was published in English translation by Wieland Hoban through Semiotext(e) on 19 August 2016.

== Reception ==
The Canadian philosopher Marie-Eve Morin highlights the large scope of Sloterdijk's attempt to analyze globalisation through the spatial implications in Martin Heidegger's Dasein concept, writing that the Spheres trilogy offers "a comprehensive narrative concerning the historical development of humankind". Comparing the Spheres trilogy to the pessimistic theories about human societies in Carl Schmitt's Land and Sea (1942), the media studies scholar Ethan Stoneman writes that Sloterdijk's "spherology" offers an affirmative "spatial anthropology" where shared spaces and shared living are ever-renewable, without the need for nostalgia, resignation or expansionist geopolitics.
