= State of exception =

State in which the sovereign may ignore the law in the name of the public good

A state of exception (German: Ausnahmezustand) is a legal and political concept introduced in the 1920s by the German philosopher, jurist and later Nazi Party member Carl Schmitt, which refers to a situation in which the sovereign suspends the operation of the legal order. The exception forms part of Schmitt's theory of sovereignty, and is summarised in his 1922 book Political Theology, where Schmitt relates the exception to his theory of sovereignty through the formulation "sovereign is he who decides on the exception".

The state of exception is broader than the notion of a state of emergency (martial law), as deciding upon a state of exception does not need to be grounded in any legal basis, and is instead a pure decision of the sovereign. While a state of emergency may be facilitated by the legal norms of the current legal regime (such as the constitution), a state of exception emerges from a "political" decision that transcends the legal order. As Schmitt argued in The Concept of the Political, the core of the "political" domain is distinguishing between friends and enemies, and the sovereign similarly decides between the friends and enemies of the legal order in making a decision upon the exception. The legal order can subsequently be founded upon the friend-enemy distinction: "the rule proves nothing; the exception proves everything".

== Background ==
The idea that a state may need to deal with unforeseen and critical problems is ancient; for instance, the Republican Roman concept of the dictatorship allowed a single person to take extraordinary measures, under strict controls. Renaissance thinkers such as Machiavelli and Jean Bodin also discussed the problem. However, while monarchy implies elements of unaccountability and extralegal powers, modern republican constitutions attempt to remove these factors, raising the question of how to deal with such emergencies.

Before the twentieth century, constitutions did not define a state of emergency in great detail. For instance, the Constitution of the United States allows the suspension of habeas corpus, but only with the agreement of Congress; the executive does not have this power itself. The French Constitution of 1848 stated that a law should be passed defining a state of exception, but did not itself define one. Given the difficult circumstances of post-World War One Germany, it is understandable that the Weimar Constitution included Article 48, allowing emergency powers; however, these were never legally defined.

== Theory ==
Schmitt introduced the concept of "state of emergency" in his 1921 essay On Dictatorship, influenced by what he saw as the weakness of the Weimar Constitution and the necessity of a ruler with a strong degree of executive power. In his later essay Political Theology he defined sovereignty as, essentially, the ability to interpret and change the law to the extent of its unilateral nullification and amendment, and that this was necessary given the unforeseeable nature of emergencies. More importantly, the sovereign according to Schmitt is defined by his decision on what constitutes the exception, leaving him both within and outside the boundaries of a state's legal order. Furthermore, "In Schmitt's terms," M. Gessen wrote in Surviving Autocracy (2020), when an emergency "shakes up the accepted order of things...the sovereign steps forward and institutes new, extralegal rules."

This concept is developed in Giorgio Agamben's book State of Exception (2005) and Achille Mbembe's Necropolitics (2019). Agamben investigates how the state of exception can become extended, for instance how the United States treated prisoners captured during the "war on terror", and Mbembe describes how the state of exception can be used to reduce people to precarity and justify violence and killing.

It can be either grounded upon autonomous sources of law (like international treaties) or featured as external to the juridical order.

== Examples ==
An example from Nazi Germany is the Reichstag Fire (the arson against the German parliament) which led to President von Hindenburg's Reichstag Fire Decree following Hitler's advice. This decree indefinitely suspended most of the Weimar Republic's civil liberties, including habeas corpus, freedom of expression, freedom of the press, freedom of association, and the right to public assembly. A month later, after the government had used these powers to arrest Communist and Social Democrat members, the Reichstag passed the Enabling Act, with the legal assistance of Schmitt, allowing Hitler to rule without the Reichstag's consent. Although couched as a temporary measure, the state of exception remained in place until Hitler's defeat in 1945, allowing him to rule under what amounted to continuous martial law.

The consequences of entering a state of exception may unroll slowly. "Even the original Reichstag Fire was not the Reichstag Fire of our imagination—a singular event that changed the course of history once and for all," Gessen wrote, pointing out that the Second World War did not begin for another six years after the Reichstag had burned.

Another example of the use of the state of exception is arguably prevalent in the Mandate for Palestine and Israel until the early 1960s. According to scholar Noura Erakat in her work Justice for Some: Law and Question of Palestine (2019), the British Mandate for Palestine had constituted a "sovereign exception". This is arguable because, in contrast to other Category A mandates such as the Mandate for Syria and the Lebanon, the British mandate for Palestine prohibited the Palestinian communities to gain provincial independence in its plight for self-governance, even if other League of Nations mandates aimed to grant the right of independence to other native Arab communities at the end of each mandate period. Erakat highlights this point by referring to the Mandate authorities' response to the 1936–1939 Arab revolt in Palestine, where pre-existing legal orders were relinquished in response to the rise in violence.

In the case of the modern state of Israel from its inception to the early 1960s, Erakat argues that a state of exception was part of the way civil administration treated the livelihoods and properties of Palestinian inhabitants in the state of Israel and those who fled during and after the 1948 Palestine war. Erakat refers to the defence emergency regulations passed and laws passed by the Israeli Knesset in the 1950s to highlight how property and land belonging to Palestinian inhabitants left empty after the war, were subject to the sovereign exception under the banner of security considerations.

On March 27, 2022, the Legislative Assembly of El Salvador approved a state of exception in accordance with Article 29 of the Salvadoran constitution.

== See also ==
- State of emergency
- Unitary executive theory

== Sources ==
- Carl Schmitt, Die Diktatur. Von den Anfängen des modernen Souveränitätsgedankens bis zum proletarischen Klassenkampf, 1921.
- Carl Schmitt, Politische Theologie. Vier Kapitel zur Lehre von der Souveränität, 1922.
