= Karl Theodor Keim =

German Protestant theologian (1825–1878)

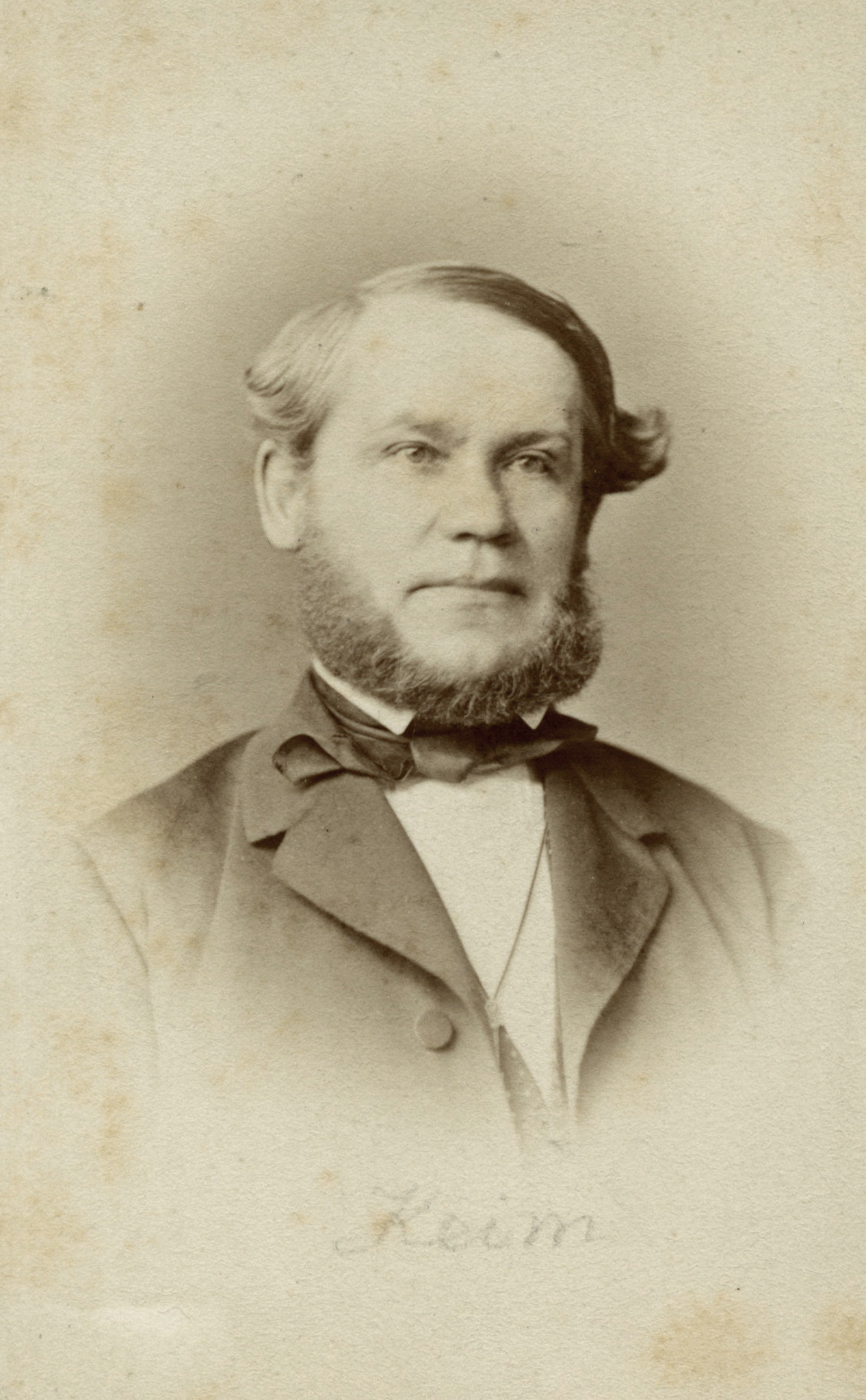
photo of Karl Theodor Keim

Karl Theodor Keim (December 17, 1825 – November 17, 1878) was a German Protestant theologian.

He was born at Stuttgart. His father, Johann Christian Keim, was headmaster of a gymnasium. Here Karl Theodor received his early education, and then proceeded to the Stuttgart Obergymnasium. In 1843 he went to the university of Tübingen, where he studied philosophy under J. F. Reiff, a follower of Hegel, and Oriental languages under Heinrich Ewald and Heinrich Meier. F. C. Baur, the leader of the new Tübingen school, was lecturing on the New Testament and on the history of the church and of dogma, and by him in particular Keim was greatly impressed.

The special bent of Keim's mind is seen in his prize essay, Verhältniss der Christen in den ersten drei Jahrhunderten bis Konstantin zum römischen Reiche (1847). His first published work was Die Reformation der Reichstadt Ulm (1851). In 1850 he visited the University of Bonn, where he attended some of the lectures of Friedrich Bleek, Richard Rothe, C. M. Arndt, and Isaak Dorner. He taught at Tübingen from June 1851 until 1856, when, having become a pastor, he was made deacon at Esslingen am Neckar, in Württemberg.

In 1859 he was appointed archdeacon, but a few months later he was called to the University of Zürich as professor of theology (1859-1873), where he produced his important works. Before this he had written on church history (e.g. Schwäbische Reformationsgeschichte bis zum Augsburger Reichstag, 1855). His inaugural address at Zürich on the human development of Jesus, Die menschliche Entwicklung Jesu Christi (1861), and his Die geschichtliche Würde Jesu (1864) were preparatory to his chief work, Die Geschichte Jesu von Nazara in ihrer Verkettung mit dem Gesamtleben seines Volkes (3 volumes, 1867–1872; Eng. trans., Jesus of Nazareth, and the National Life of Israel, 6 volumes), 1873–1882. In 1873 Keim was appointed professor of theology at Gießen. This post he resigned, through ill-health, shortly before his death. He belonged to the "mediation" school of theology.

Chief works, besides the above: Reformationsblätter der Reichsstadt Esslingen (1860); Ambrosius Blarer, der Schwäbische Reformator (1860); Der Übertritt Konstantins d. Gr. zum Christenthum (1862); his sermons, Freundesworte zur Gemeinde (2 volumes, 1861–1862); and Celsus' wahres Wort (1873). In 1881 H. Ziegler published one of Keim's earliest works, Rom und das Christenthum, with a biographical sketch.
