= Carl Friedrich von Siemens Foundation =

German foundation

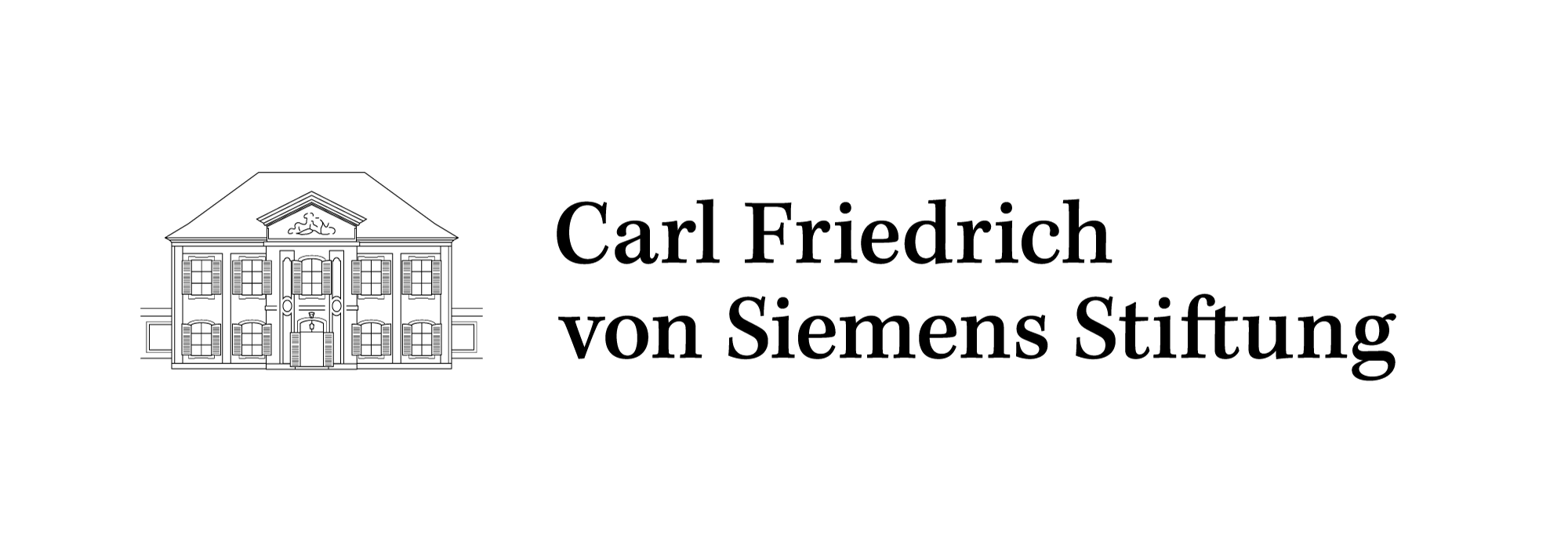
- Formation: 1958 in Munich
- Founder: Ernst von Siemens
- Headquarters: Schloss Nymphenburg
- Managing Director: Isabel Pfeiffer-Poensgen
- Website: https://www.cfvss.de

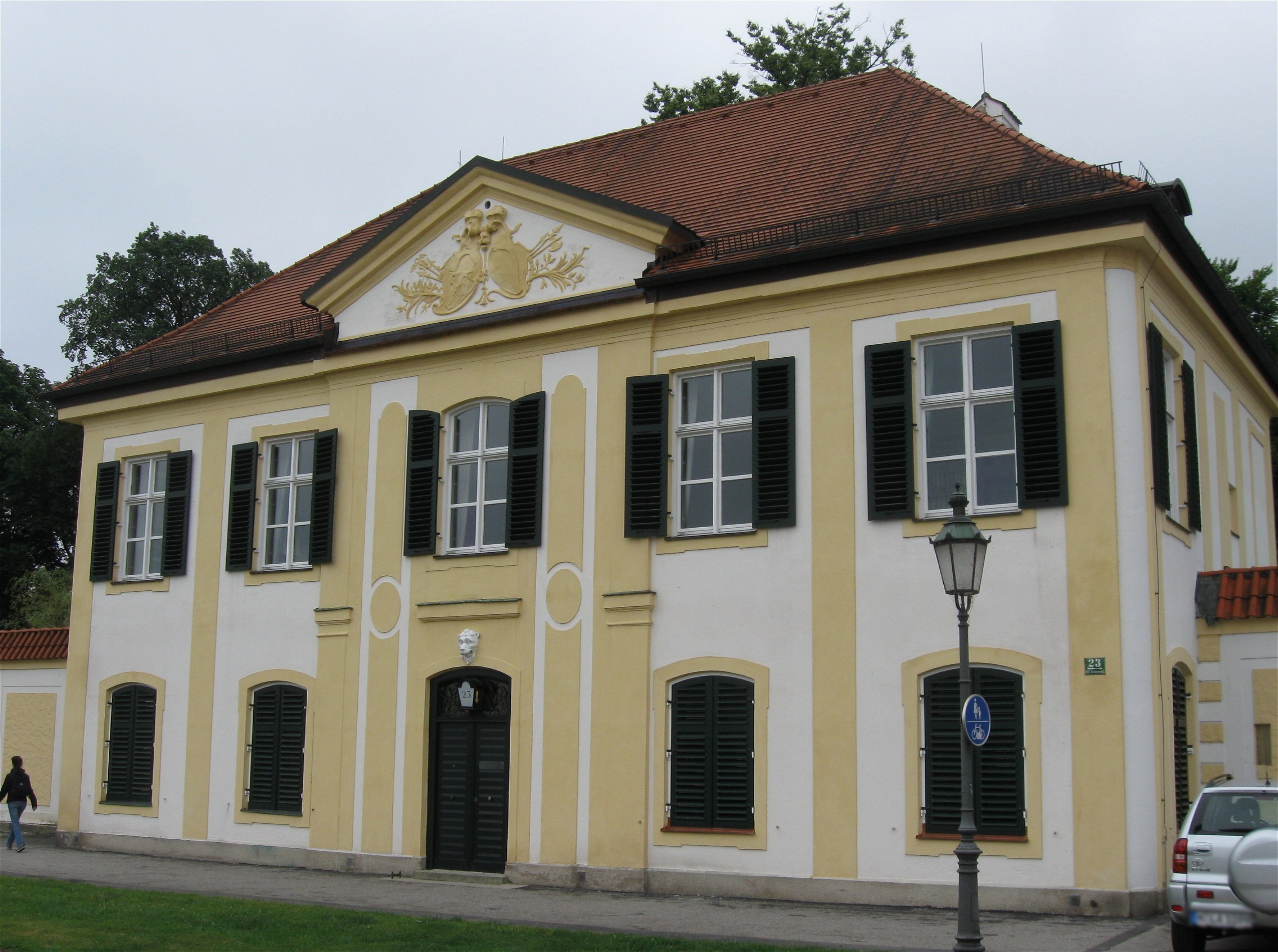
The Carl Friedrich von Siemens Foundation building in Munich

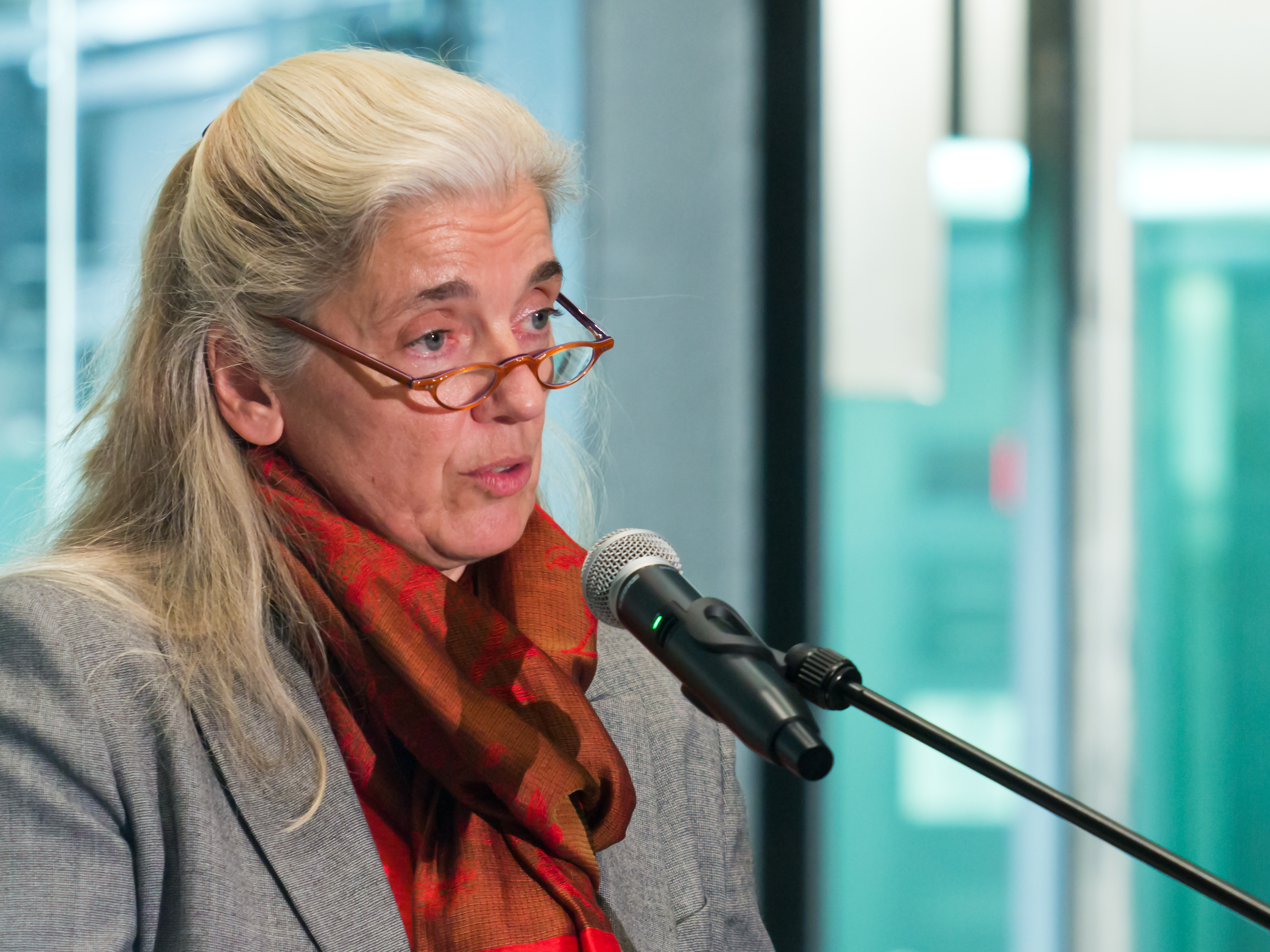
Isabel Pfeiffer-Poensgen, managing director

The Carl Friedrich von Siemens Foundation aims to promote science. The foundation was established in 1958 on the initiative of entrepreneur Ernst von Siemens. The managing director was the philosopher Heinrich Meier until March 2022. In the summer semester of 2022, the literary scholar Marcel Lepper took over the management. Since February 22, 2023, the foundation has been temporarily managed by Carola Schütt, who previously held the commercial management. Armin Mohler, who popularized the concept of the conservative revolution, chaired the foundation for many years from 1964 to 1985, making the foundation a central place for the “New Right” of the time.

== History ==
Ernst von Siemens, chairman of the supervisory board of Siemens AG from 1956 to 1971, established the Foundation from his private assets. It bears the name of his father Carl Friedrich von Siemens, who was also chairman of the supervisory board of Siemens Group between 1919 and 1941. From 1964 the foundation's managing director was the publicist Armin Mohler, and in 1985 Heinrich Meier succeeded Mohler. Since October 2023, the foundation has had an award-winning politician and administrative official as its managing director, Isabel Pfeiffer-Poensgen.

=== The foundation under Armin Mohler 1964–1985 ===
Mohler used the foundation mainly for political events. An example of this is a famous series on Carl Schmitt organized by Mohler in 1978. The lectures were then published by Propyläen-Verlag under the title Der Ernstfall as the second volume in the Foundation's series of publications, even though Schmitt was academically and journalistically isolated because of his commitment to Nazi Germany. Speakers were Among others Knut Borchardt, Paul Carell, Hellmut Diwald and Christian Meier. The series was understood as a tribute to Schmitt. Other publications of the foundations also dealt with persons or topics related to the New Right.

In 1980, the historian Ernst Nolte gave a lecture at the Carl Friedrich von Siemens Foundation entitled Zwischen Geschichtslegende und Revisionismus (Between Historical Legend and Revisionism), which the Frankfurter Allgemeine Zeitung published, thus triggering the Historikerstreit, the so-called historians' dispute.

=== The foundation under Heinrich Meier 1985–2022 ===
Today the foundation has the following priorities:

- To organize scientific, interdisciplinary lecture series by individual speakers and to publish them.
  Some speakers who have given lectures at the Foundation includes Jan Assmann, Ernst-Wolfgang Böckenförde, Jean Bollack, J. M. Coetzee, Richard Dawkins, Daniel Dennett, Philippe Descola, Louis Dumont, Ronald Dworkin, Ágnes Heller, Paul Kirchhof, Jean-François Lyotard, Peter von Matt, Ernst Mayr, Ilya Prigogine, Martin Rees, Karl Schlögel, Wolf Singer, Andreas Urs Sommer and Helen Vendler. Some of the lectures are published in the series Themen der Carl Friedrich von Siemens Stiftung (since 1985 more than 40 volumes have been published).
- To award the Carl Friedrich von Siemens Fellowships to outstanding scientists (since 1993). These fellowships support the completion of research by outstanding scientists.
- To support the supplement of scientific literature, which includes the supply of university libraries.
- To organize guest events, scientific conferences and international symposia. Special emphasis is placed on promoting contact between German and foreign scientists.

== Critique ==
Numerous experts on right-wing extremism, such as Peter Glotz consider the Carl Friedrich von Siemens Foundation under the management of Armin Mohlers to be a think tank of the New Right and assign the foundation to the New Right.
