= The Practice of the 'One Country, Two Systems' Policy in the Hong Kong Special Administrative Region =

2014 paper on comprehensive jurisdiction over HKSAR

The Practice of the 'One Country, Two Systems' Policy in the Hong Kong Special Administrative Region 「一國兩制」在香港特別行政區的實踐
- Author: State Council Information Office
- Language: Chinese
- Published: 10 June 2014
- Publication place: China
- ISBN: 978-7-01-013362-1

The Practice of the 'One Country, Two Systems' Policy in the Hong Kong Special Administrative Region is a white paper issued by the State Council Information Office of the People's Republic of China (PRC) on the practice of the "one country, two systems" policy in the Hong Kong Special Administrative Region (HKSAR).

The paper was issued on 10 June 2014 in the midst of public debate on the 2014 Hong Kong electoral reform and preparations for the Occupy Central movement by the pro-democracy camp. The paper stated the scope of Hong Kong's high degree of autonomy is not inherent, but solely determined by the Central Authorities' delegation of power, stating Hong Kong that did not have residual powers. It reasserts the "comprehensive jurisdiction" of Central Authorities over all of China, including the Hong Kong Special Administrative Region.

== Content ==
The white paper provided a historical review over the design and implementation of One Country, Two Systems (OCTS). While the White Paper itself has no binding legal authority, it is regarded a significant statement of the Central Authorities on the framework of the OCTS policy. Peking University legal theorist Jiang Shigong has been cited by Apple Daily as an author of the report.

=== No Residual Powers ===
The white paper is the first official policy document that the Central Authorities have released to provide response to the issue of residual powers. It stated that the scope of Hong Kong's high degree of autonomy is not inherent, but solely determined by the Central Authorities' delegation of power. Thus, the White Paper concluded that there is no residual power for the HKSAR. Any power the Central Authorities did not explicitly authorize to the Hong Kong Special Administrative Region through the Basic Law is retained by the Central Authorities.

The white paper asserts that:

"The high degree of autonomy of the HKSAR [Hong Kong Special Administrative Region] is not full autonomy, nor a decentralised power [...] It is the power to run local affairs as authorised by the central leadership."

=== Comprehensive Jurisdiction ===
The white paper reasserts the "comprehensive jurisdiction" of Central Authorities over all of China, including the Hong Kong Special Administrative Region. The Paper provides no further explanation to the term. A speech made in 2017 by Zhang Dejiang, then-Chairman of the Standing Committee of the National People's Congress, provided that the overall jurisdiction includes powers in eight aspects:

- to appoint the CE and principal authorities of the HKSAR government;
- to receive the appointment of CFA judges and the Chief Judge of the High Court;
- to manage diplomatic affairs related to the HKSAR;
- to build the People's Liberation Army Hong Kong Garrison for defense duties;
- to exercise the power of interpreting the Basic Law;
- to exercise the power to make decisions on major issues;
- to exercise the power of approving and recording HKSAR legislations enacted; and
- to decide on implementations of national laws on the HKSAR.

=== Patriots administering Hong Kong ===
The white paper stresses that loving the country is the basic principle for Hong Kong's administrators, including:

- the chief executive;
- principal officials;
- members of the Executive Council;
- members of the Legislative Council; and
- judges of the courts at different levels and other judicial personnel.

The white paper further states the responsibilities for administrators of Hong Kong:

"[administrators] shoulder the responsibility of safeguarding the country's sovereignty, security and development interests and [to ensure] the long-term prosperity and stability of Hong Kong."

=== Foreign interference ===
The Central Authorities have also stated its opinion on foreign interference over the Hong Kong Special Administrative Region:

"[one should] stay alert to the attempt of outside forces to use Hong Kong to interfere China's domestic affairs, and prevent and repel the attempt made by a very small number of people who act in collusion with outside forces to interfere with the implementation of 'one country, two systems' in Hong Kong."

== Reception ==
The white paper ignited a firestorm of criticism from various sectors in Hong Kong who worried that the Communist leadership was reneging on its pledges to abide by the "one country, two systems" policy that allows for a democratic, autonomous Hong Kong under Beijing's rule.
