= Hugo E. Herrera =

Chilean legal philosopher and academic (born 1974)

- Born: Hugo Eduardo Herrera Arellano; February 5, 1974 (age 52); Viña del Mar, Chile
- Education: University of Valparaíso; University of Würzburg
- Occupations: Legal philosopher, academic
- Employer: Diego Portales University
- Known for: Work on Kant, Salomon Maimon, German Idealism, and Chilean intellectual history

Hugo E. Herrera (born 5 February 1974) is a Chilean legal philosopher and academic. He is a professor of philosophy at the Faculty of Law of Diego Portales University in Santiago, Chile. His academic work focuses on modern philosophy, particularly Immanuel Kant, post-Kantian philosophy, and early German Idealism. He has also written essays on Chilean political thought and intellectual history.

== Early life and education ==
Herrera studied law at the University of Valparaíso, completing a thesis under the supervision of Aldo Valle and Joaquín García-Huidobro Correa. In 2004 he received a doctorate (Dr. phil.) in philosophy from the University of Würzburg.

== Academic career ==
Herrera is a professor of philosophy at Diego Portales University. From 2015 to 2020 he served as director of the university's Institute of Philosophy. His 2010 monograph on Carl Schmitt was published by Duncker & Humblot in Berlin, and his 2020 book Carl Schmitt Between Technological Rationality and Theology was published by SUNY Press. His work has appeared in peer-reviewed journals including The Review of Metaphysics, European Journal of Philosophy, History of European Ideas, and Idealistic Studies. His publications are indexed in international bibliographic databases including PhilPapers and Dialnet.

== Scholarship ==
=== Kant, post-Kantian philosophy, and German Idealism ===
Herrera has written on Kant's practical philosophy, particularly the relation between freedom and the consciousness of moral law. A substantial part of his research concerns Salomon Maimon and Maimon's engagement with Kant, including studies on intellectual intuition and the problem of the given. Herrera has also published on Friedrich Hölderlin and early German Romanticism, addressing themes such as the unity of experience and the concept of ground (Urgrund).

=== Political Philosophy ===
In his book Carl Schmitt between Technological Rationality and Theology (2020), Herrera develops a philosophical interpretation of Carl Schmitt’s thought centered on the concept of juridical understanding.

Within this framework, Herrera engages critically with influential contemporary interpretations of Schmitt’s work, including those proposed by Jacques Derrida and Heinrich Meier. Regarding Meier’s interpretation of Schmitt as primarily a political theologian, Herrera argues that such a characterization relies on a limited textual basis and does not sufficiently account for the broader philosophical structure of Schmitt’s work.

Herrera has also examined Derrida’s interpretation of Schmitt’s legal thought. In an article published in Telos, he discusses Derrida’s claim that Schmitt’s conception of juridical decision ultimately reproduces the logic of technical rationality. Herrera argues that Schmitt distinguishes between technical rationality, oriented toward calculation and control, and a juridical form of understanding that remains open to the singularity of concrete situations and to the exceptional character of human existence.

According to Herrera, Schmitt’s conception of juridical reasoning seeks to mediate between rule and case in a manner distinct from both technical manipulation and purely decisionistic approaches.

== Reception ==
Herrera’s books have received academic review in journals such as Estudios Públicos, Revista de Ciencia Política, and Historia 396, where commentators have discussed his interpretations of Chilean political thought and intellectual history. Some of his work on Kant and Maimon has been cited in subsequent academic research on post-Kantian philosophy. Herrera’s work has received also attention in Chilean political and legal philosophy. The philosopher and legal theorist Renato Cristi (Wilfrid Laurier University) described him as “the most serious, learned, and intellectually accomplished right-of-centre intellectual at present,” in a published commentary discussing contemporary political thought in Chile.

== Selected works ==
- Sein und Staat. Königshausen & Neumann, 2005.
- Carl Schmitt als politischer Philosoph. Duncker & Humblot, 2010.
- La derecha en la crisis del bicentenario. Ediciones UDP, 2015.
- Octubre en Chile. Katankura, 2019.
- Carl Schmitt Between Technological Rationality and Theology. SUNY Press, 2020.
