= Octubre en Chile =

2019 book by Hugo Herrera

October in Chile: Event and Political Understanding: Toward a Popular Republicanism
- Author: Hugo E. Herrera
- Original title: Octubre en Chile: Acontecimiento y comprensión política: hacia un republicanismo popular
- Language: Spanish
- Subject: Political philosophy; Chilean politics
- Publisher: Katankura
- Publication date: 2019
- Publication place: Chile
- Media type: Print
- ISBN: 9789560942012

October in Chile: Event and Political Understanding: Toward a Popular Republicanism (Spanish: Octubre en Chile: Acontecimiento y comprensión política: hacia un republicanismo popular) is a 2019 book by Chilean legal philosopher and political thinker Hugo E. Herrera. The work provides an early interpretative account of the 2019–2020 Chilean protests ("Estallido social"), advancing a philosophical diagnosis centred on the notion of a crisis of political understanding.

Written in the immediate aftermath of the protests, the book departs from explanations focused primarily on inequality or institutional failure, proposing instead that the crisis revealed a breakdown in the capacity of political actors and institutions to interpret social reality adequately.

== Overview ==
The book seeks to provide a conceptual framework for understanding the Chilean protests beyond standard socio-economic explanations. Herrera argues that the events of October 2019 cannot be fully explained in terms of material inequality or policy failures alone but must be understood as a crisis in the interpretative relationship between political institutions and society.

Drawing on traditions of political philosophy and hermeneutics, the work introduces the notion of political understanding as a key analytical category. According to this approach, political order depends not only on institutional design or distributive outcomes but also on the capacity of governing actors to grasp and articulate the lived experience of the population.

The book further develops the concept of popular republicanism, presented as a possible response to the crisis. This notion seeks to reconcile republican political traditions with a renewed emphasis on the role of the people as a bearer of political meaning.

== Main thesis ==
The central claim of the book is that the Chilean crisis should be interpreted as a crisis of political understanding. Herrera argues that:

- Political institutions failed to interpret social reality adequately;
- The crisis reflected a disconnection between formal structures and lived experience;

In this sense, the work proposes a shift from structural and economic explanations towards a hermeneutic account of political crisis.

== Reception ==
=== Academic reviews ===
The book has received several peer-reviewed academic reviews.

Ignacio Serrano del Pozo, writing in the Revista de Filosofía (University of Chile), highlights the originality of the work and its departure from conventional economic explanations of the crisis.

Luis Aránguiz Kahn, in Cultura & Religión, interprets the book as an early and conceptually ambitious intervention, emphasising its engagement with political theology and its attempt to articulate a broader interpretative framework.

Carlos Hoevel, reviewing the book in Estudios Públicos, underscores its effort to capture the philosophical and existential dimensions of the Chilean crisis.

=== Use in scholarly literature ===
Beyond dedicated reviews, the book has been cited and discussed in academic analyses of the Chilean uprising.

Luis Placencia includes the work in a broader examination of interpretations of the October events, engaging directly with its central thesis.

Danilo Martuccelli situates the book among a group of key works addressing the Chilean process in a comparative analysis of the literature.

The book has also been included in the bibliographies and interpretative frameworks of subsequent academic publications addressing the protests, including articles in journals such as Revista de Estudios Sociales, Perfiles Económicos, and the Revista de Humanidades de Valparaíso.

=== Intellectual context and implicit reception ===
Scholarly discussions of the Chilean protests have increasingly emphasised themes such as the crisis of representation, the disconnection between elites and society, and the symbolic and cultural dimensions of political unrest. Within this broader context, the book has been associated with a shift in the literature from predominantly structural and economic explanations towards approaches that stress interpretative and hermeneutic dimensions of political crisis.

Although not all such approaches explicitly cite Herrera’s work, the convergence of these themes has been noted in analyses that situate early interpretative texts within the evolving academic understanding of the Chilean uprising.

== Significance ==
The book is regarded as one of the early attempts to provide a systematic philosophical interpretation of the 2019 Chilean protests. Its significance lies in its effort to reframe the crisis as a problem of political understanding and to introduce conceptual tools for analysing the relationship between institutions and social experience.

It is often included among a group of works that sought to interpret the Chilean uprising beyond immediate policy debates, contributing to ongoing discussions on representation, legitimacy, and political order in contemporary Chile.
