= Volker Gerhardt =

German philosopher (born 1944)

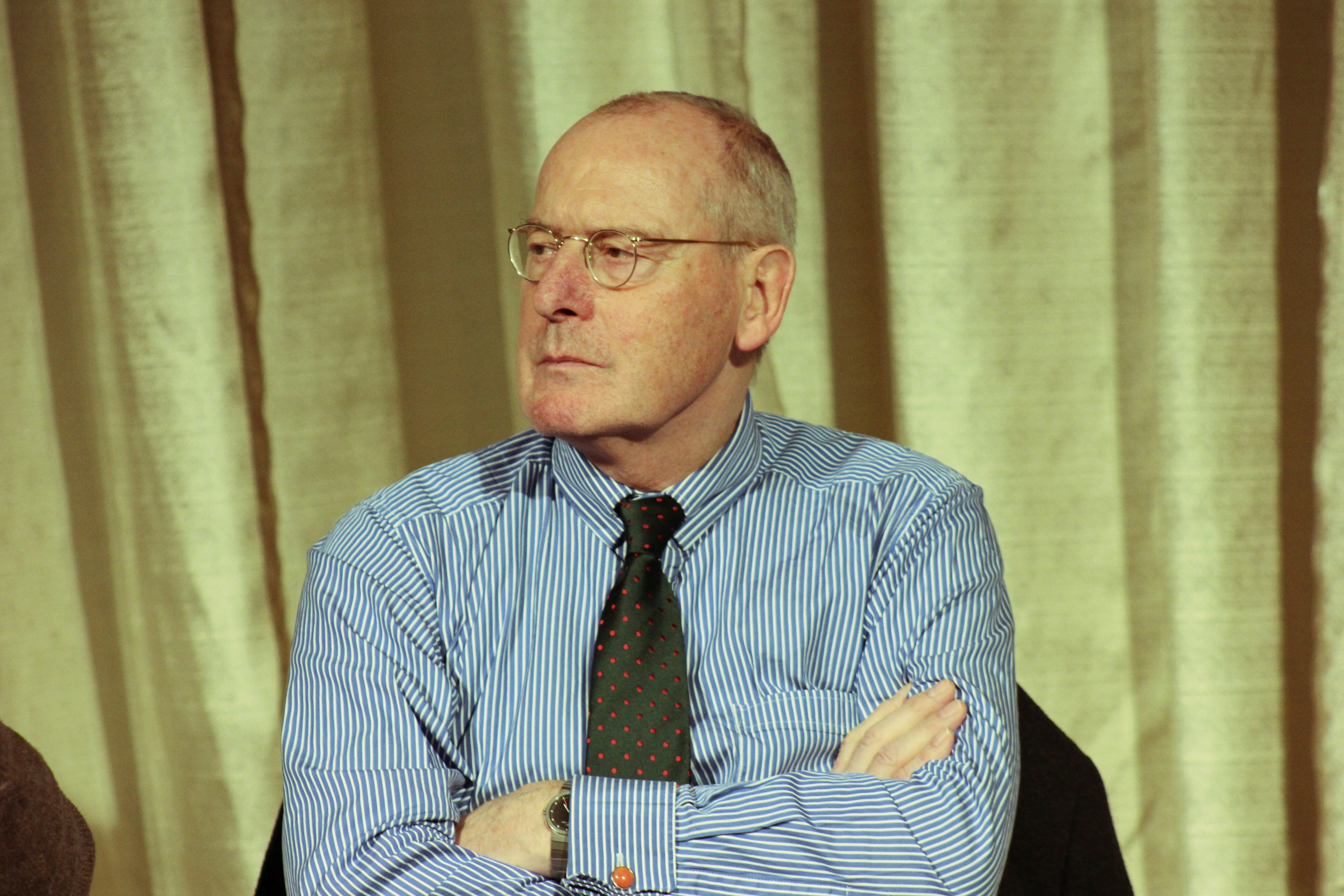
The philosopher Volker Gerhardt at the conference "Fall of Darkness" on January 25th, 2014 in the Berlin Volkbühne.

Volker Gerhardt (born July 21, 1944) is a German philosopher. He specializes in ethics, political philosophy, aesthetics, metaphysics and theology. His historical studies are centered on Plato, Kant and Nietzsche but have also dealt with Hegel, Marx, Jaspers, Voegelin, Hannah Arendt, Carl Schmitt and others.

Volker Gerhardt studied philosophy, psychology and law in Frankfurt and Münster. He obtained his doctorate at Münster, and received his Habilitation there in 1984.

In 1985 Gerhardt became Professor of Philosophy at Münster. From 1988 to 1992 he led the Institute of Philosophy at the Deutsche Sporthochschule Köln. In 1992 he became Professor for Practical Philosophy at the Humboldt University in Berlin.

== Other activities ==
- German Ethics Council, Member (2008-2012)

== Writings ==
- Pathos und Distanz: Studien zur Philosophie Friedrich Nietzsches. Reclam, Stuttgart 1988. ISBN 978-3150085042.
- Friedrich Nietzsche. Beck, München 4. Auflage 2006. ISBN 978-3406541230.
- Immanuel Kants Entwurf 'Zum ewigen Frieden'. Eine Theorie der Politik. Wissenschaftliche Buchgesellschaft, Darmstadt 1999. ISBN 978-3110128017.
- Vom Willen zur Macht. Anthropologie und Metaphysik der Macht am exemplarischen Fall Friedrich Nietzsches. de Gruyter, Berlin, New York 1996. ISBN 978-3110128017.
- Selbstbestimmung: Das Prinzip der Individualität. Reclam, Stuttgart 1999. ISBN 978-3150097618.
- Individualität. Das Element der Welt. Beck, München 2000. ISBN 978-3406459214.
- Der Mensch wird geboren. Kleine Apologie der Humanität. Beck, München 2002. ISBN 978-3406485435.
- Immanuel Kant: Vernunft und Leben. Reclam, Stuttgart 2002. ISBN 978-3150182352.
- Die angeborene Würde des Menschen: Aufsätze zur Biopolitik. Parerga, Berlin 2003. ISBN 978-3937262086.
- Partizipation. Das Prinzip der Politik. Beck, München 2007, ISBN 3406528880. Buchbesprechung von Frank Hahn
- Exemplarisches Denken: Aufsätze aus dem Merkur. Fink Verlag, München 2008. ISBN 978-3770545858.
- Existentieller Liberalismus: Beiträge zur Politischen Philosophie und zum politischen Zeitgeschehen, Hrsg. Héctor Wittwer. Duncker & Humblot, Berlin 2009. ISBN 978-3428129188.
- Die Funken des freien Geistes: Neuere Aufsätze zu Nietzsches Philosophie der Zukunft, Hrsg. J.-Ch. Heilinger und N. Loukidelis. de Gruyter, Berlin 2011. ISBN 978-3110246629.
- Der Sinn des Sinns: Versuch über das Göttliche, C. H. Beck, München 2014. ISBN 978-3-406-66934-7.
