= Theory of the Partisan =

1963 book by Carl Schmitt

- Author: Carl Schmitt
- Original title: Theorie des Partisanen
- Translator: G. L. Ulmen
- Language: German
- Publisher: Duncker & Humblot
- Publication date: 1963
- Publication place: West Germany
- English publication date: 1 June 2007
- Pages: 96

Theory of the Partisan: Intermediate Commentary on the Concept of the Political (German: Theorie des Partisanen. Zwischenbemerkung zum Begriff des Politischen) is a 1963 book by the German writer Carl Schmitt. It is based on two lectures Schmitt held in Francoist Spain in 1962 and covers military history, political philosophy and the legal and administrative aspects of partisanship. Schmitt intended it as a concretisation and update for the post-war period of his thesis from The Concept of the Political (1932).
