= Reinhard Mehring =

German political scientist and philosopher (born 1959)

Reinhard Mehring (born 7 April 1959) is a German political scientist and philosopher who has written extensively on Carl Schmitt.

== Biography ==
Reinhard Mehring was born in Düsseldorf on 7 April 1959. He studied at the University of Bonn and University of Freiburg. In 1988, he obtaining a doctorate in political science in Freiburg with a work on Carl Schmitt. Since 1989, Mehring has worked at the Heinrich Heine University Düsseldorf, University of Würzburg, Humboldt University of Berlin and Pädagogische Hochschule Heidelberg.

Mehring's book Carl Schmitt: A Biography (German: Carl Schmitt. Aufstieg und Fall. Eine Biographie) was published in German in 2009 and English in 2014.

== Published works ==
Monographies

- Pathetisches Denken. Carl Schmitts Denkweg am Leitfaden Hegels. Katholische Grundstellung und antimarxistische Hegelstrategie. Duncker & Humblot, Berlin 1989, ISBN 978-3-428-06731-2.
- Thomas Mann. Künstler und Philosoph. Fink Verlag, München 2001, ISBN 978-3-7705-3589-7.
- Das „Problem der Humanität“. Thomas Manns politische Philosophie. Mentis-Verlag, Paderborn 2003, ISBN 978-3-89785-365-2.
- Carl Schmitt. Aufstieg und Fall. Eine Biographie. C. H. Beck, München 2009, ISBN 978-3-406-59224-9 (2022, ISBN 978-3-406-78563-4).
- Carl Schmitt zur Einführung. Junius Verlag, 2011, ISBN 978-3-88506-685-9.
- Kriegstechniker des Begriffs. Biographische Studien zu Carl Schmitt. Mohr Siebeck, Tübingen 2014, ISBN 978-3-16-153452-2.
- Heideggers „große Politik“. Die semantische Revolution der Gesamtausgabe. Mohr Siebeck, Tübingen 2016, ISBN 978-3-16-154374-6.
- Carl Schmitt: Denker im Widerstreit. Werk – Wirkung – Aktualität. Verlag Karl Alber, Freiburg 2017, ISBN 978-3-495-48897-3.
- Die Erfindung der Freiheit. Vom Aufstieg und Fall der philosophischen Pädagogik. Königshausen & Neumann, Würzburg 2018, ISBN 978-3-8260-6428-9.
- Martin Heidegger und die „konservative Revolution“. Verlag Karl Alber, Freiburg/München 2018, ISBN 978-3-495-48979-6.
- Philosophie im Exil. Emil Utitz, Arthur Liebert und die Exilzeitschrift Philosophia. Dokumentation zum Schicksal zweier Holocaust-Opfer. Königshausen & Neumann, Würzburg 2018, ISBN 978-3-8260-6449-4.
- Vom Umgang mit Carl Schmitt. Die Forschungsdynamik der letzten Epoche im Rezensionsspiegel. Nomos Verlag, Baden-Baden 2018, ISBN 978-3-8487-5156-3.
- Die neue Bundesrepublik. Zwischen Nationalisierung und Globalisierung. Kohlhammer Verlag, Stuttgart 2019, ISBN 978-3-17-033941-5.
- Thomas Manns philosophische Dichtung. Vom Grund und Zweck seines Projekts. Verlag Karl Alber, Freiburg/München 2019, ISBN 978-3-495-49045-7.
- Carl Schmitts Gegenrevolution. CEP Europäische Verlagsanstalt, Hamburg 2021, ISBN 978-3-86393-118-6.
- „Kafkanien“. Carl Schmitt, Franz Kafka und der moderne Verfassungsstaat. Dekonstruktion und Dämonisierung des Rechts. Vittorio Klostermann, Frankfurt am Main 2022, ISBN 978-3-465-04589-2.
- Aus der Elendsgeschichte des deutschen Privatdozenten. Prosastücke zum denkwürdigen Schicksal des Friedrich Eduard Beneke. Matthes & Seitz, Berlin 2022, ISBN 978-3-7518-0544-5.
- „Dass die Luft die Erde frisst …“. Neue Studien zu Carl Schmitt. Nomos, Baden-Baden 2024, ISBN 978-3-7560-1246-6.

As editor

- With Volker Gerhardt und Jana Rindert: Berliner Geist. Eine Geschichte der Berliner Universitätsphilosophie bis 1946, Akademie-Verlag, Berlin 1999, ISBN 978-3-05-002961-0.
- Carl Schmitt: Der Begriff des Politischen, Akademie-Verlag, Berlin 2003, ISBN 978-3-05-003687-8.
- „Auf der gefahrenvollen Straße des öffentlichen Rechts....“ Briefwechsel Carl Schmitt – Rudolf Smend 1921–1961, Duncker & Humblot, Berlin 2010, 2. überarb. Aufl. Berlin 2012, ISBN 978-3-428-13753-4.
- With Martin Otto: Voraussetzungen und Garantien des Staates. Ernst-Wolfgang Böckenfördes Staatsverständnis. Nomos, Baden-Baden 2014, ISBN 978-3-8487-1636-4.
- Ethik nach Theresienstadt. Späte Texte des Prager Philosophen Emil Utitz (1883–1956). Königshausen & Neumann, Würzburg 2015, ISBN 978-3-8260-5655-0.
- With Armin von Bogdandy: Heinrich Triepel. Parteienstaat und Staatsgerichtshof. Gesammelte verfassungspolitische Schriften zur Weimarer Republik. Nomos, Baden-Baden 2021, ISBN 978-3-8487-7736-5.
- Welch gütiges Schicksal. Ernst-Wolfgang Böckenförde/Carl Schmitt. Briefwechsel 1953–1984. Nomos, Baden-Baden 2022, ISBN 978-3-8487-8427-1.
