= The Crisis of Parliamentary Democracy =

1923 book by Carl Schmitt

- Author: Carl Schmitt
- Original title: Die geistesgeschichtliche Lage des heutigen Parlamentarismus
- Translator: Ellen Kennedy
- Language: German
- Subject: Political theory Liberalism; Dictatorship
- Publisher: Duncker & Humblot
- Publication date: 1923 (first edition); 1926 (second edition)
- Publication place: Germany
- English publication date: 1988
- Media type: Print (hardcover and paperback)
- Pages: 132
- ISBN: 0262691264
- OCLC: 656528306
- Dewey Decimal: 328/.3
- LC Class: JF511 .S313 1985

The Crisis of Parliamentary Democracy (German: Die geistesgeschichtliche Lage des heutigen Parlamentarismus, roughly: "The Intellectual-Historical Situation of Today's Parliamentarianism") is a work of political theory written by German jurist Carl Schmitt, originally published in 1923 by Duncker & Humblot in Germany with a second edition in 1926. The book was translated into English by Ellen Kennedy in 1985 and published by MIT Press in 1988, based on the 1926 edition. In this book, Schmitt provides a critique of parliamentary democracy – particularly as embodied in the form of the Weimar Republic – and calls into question one of its central political institutions, the Reichstag.

== Context ==
In Ellen Kennedy's introduction, she claims that The Crisis of Parliamentary Democracy has been commonly read to be "welcome to the broad spectrum of anti-parliamentary prejudices in the Weimar Republic" His critiques of parliamentary democracies undermined the legitimacy of the Reichstag in the Weimar Republic. Schmitt was closely identified with Political Catholicism in the first years of the Weimar Republic and his contact with Catholic political and intellectual circles made him the leading exponent of the Catholic view among German jurists. The second edition of his book was written particularly to address the critique of Richard Thoma's review and was shown in multiple publications including Hochland – through Karl Muth in 1926– and the second edition of his Parlamentarismus. This work is representative of Schmitt's focus at the time of developing a critique of his contemporary society and the history of political ideas, particularly of democracy, liberalism, and dictatorship.

== Structure ==
The 1988 edition of the text has the following structure:

1. Preface to the Second Edition (1926): On the Contradiction Between Parliamentarism and Democracy
2. Introduction to the First Edition (1923)
3. Democracy and Parliamentarism
4. The Principles of Parliamentarism
5. Dictatorship in Marxist Thought
6. Irrationalist Theories of the Direct Use of Force
7. Appendix: On the Ideology of Parliamentarism (1925) by Richard Thoma

== Preface to the Second Edition ==
In the preface to the Second Edition (1926), Carl Schmitt directly responds to Richard Thoma's 1925 critique of the first edition (Thoma's essay is included in the appendix.) Schmitt further develops his original argument, reiterates the importance of distinguishing between democracy and liberalism, and explains that appeals to the utility or reliability of parliamentary democracy cannot serve to justify its intellectual foundations, even if pragmatic claims about parliamentary democracy might be empirically correct. Schmitt claims that every form of government – monarchy, aristocracy, democracy, etc. – rest upon some intellectual principle, and explains by way of example that monarchies rest upon the principle of honour. Analogously, Schmitt claims that "all specifically parliamentary arrangements and norms receive their meaning first through discussion and openness." There are a whole range of constitutionally-recognised measures which would be totally unintelligible if this fundamental principle of openness and discussion was no longer believed in, from the independence of representatives from their constituents and political party and the immunity of representatives while speaking in parliament, to the basic principles of freedom of speech and the openness of parliamentary procedures. In Schmitt's view, these are all grounded in the principles of discussion and openness; if these foundational principles collapse, so too does the intellectual basis of parliamentarism; Schmitt therefore seeks to demonstrate that the principles of discussion and openness have collapsed and eroded as an explanation for the perceived corruption and decay of the liberal democracy of his time.

Schmitt argues that "What numerous parliaments in various European and non-European states have produced in the way of a political elite of hundreds of successive ministers justifies no great optimism. But worse and destroying almost every hope, in a few states, parliamentarism has already produced a situation in which all public business has become an object of spoils and compromise for the parties and their followers, and politics, far from being the concern of an elite, has become the despised business of a rather dubious class of persons." So on the one hand, this is a 'practical-technical hypothesis', which can be shown to be true or false based on evidence of whether it actually guarantees the best selection of political leaders. But the conviction, or belief in parliamentarism is also based on a more principled belief in discussion and openness. But this is likewise valid only insofar as public discussion is taken seriously and implemented. Discussion is not merely negotiation – it's about a conflict of opinions, with reasons given in order to persuade others of the truth or justice of one's own opinion, not a struggle of interest: "To discussion belong shared convictions as premises, the willingness to be persuaded, independence of party ties, freedom from selfish interests. Most people today would regard such disinterestedness as scarcely possible. But even this skepticism belongs to the crisis of parliamentarism." Moreover, "In the history of political ideas, there are epochs of great energy and times becalmed, times of motionless status quo. Thus the epoch of monarchy is at an end when a sense of the principle of kingship, of honor, has been lost, if bourgeois kings appear who seek to prove their usefulness and utility instead of their devotion and honor. The external apparatus of monarchical institutions can remain standing very much longer after that. But in spite of it monarchy's hour has tolled. The convictions inherent in this and no other institution then appear antiquated; practical justifications for it will not be lacking, but it is only an empirical question whether men or organizations come forward who can prove themselves just as useful or even more so than these kings and through this simple fact brush aside monarchy."

Schmitt also argues that "Every actual democracy rests on the principle that not only are equals equal, but unequals will not be treated equally. Democracy requires, therefore, first homogeneity and second – if the need arises – elimination or eradication of heterogeneity." Equality must always exist in some substantive form, and always entails its dialectical antithesis: inequality. In this early preface can therefore be found the foundations of the theory Schmitt later went on to more fully develop in his mature thought in The Concept of the Political in 1932.
