= Ex Captivitate Salus =

1950 book by Carl Schmitt

- Author: Carl Schmitt
- Translator: Matthew Hannah
- Language: German
- Publisher: Greven Verlag Köln
- Publication date: 1950
- Publication place: West Germany
- English publication date: September 2017
- Pages: 95

Ex Captivitate Salus: Experiences, 1945–47 (German: Ex captivitate salus. Erinnerungen der Zeit 1945/47, lit. 'Salvation from Captivity: Memories of the Period 1945/47') is a memoir by the German jurist and political philosopher Carl Schmitt.

== Background ==
Schmitt began to write the book while he was imprisoned by the Allied occupiers in the aftermath of World War II. He was held in an American mass internment camp in 1945–46 and as a witness and "possible defendant" in the prison of the Nuremberg trials in 1947. Schmitt was never formally charged for anything, but was held in isolation and wrote the book as a way to cope with the situation.

== Summary ==
Schmitt used the book to personally reflect on his relationship with Nazi Germany. This reflection is combined with the histories of legal and political concepts such as just war, the right to resist, civil war and sovereignty. Schmitt argued for his own innocence and that he had no obligation to actively oppose the German government.

== Publication ==
The book was published by Greven Verlag Köln in 1950. Polity published the English translation by Matthew Hannah in 2017.
