= The Concept of the Political =

1932 book by Carl Schmitt

- Cover of the German edition
- Author: Carl Schmitt
- Translator: George Schwab
- Language: German
- Subject: Political philosophy
- Publisher: Rutgers University Press
- Publication date: 1932
- Publication place: Germany
- Media type: Print
- Pages: 105
- ISBN: 0-226-73886-8 (1996 University of Chicago Press edition)
- LC Class: JA 74 .S313
- Text: The Concept of the Political at Internet Archive

The Concept of the Political (German: Der Begriff des Politischen) is a 1932 book by the German philosopher and jurist Carl Schmitt, in which the author examines the fundamental nature of the "political" and its place in the modern world.

The Concept of the Political was published in the last days of Weimar Germany. Schmitt joined the Nazi Party in 1933, the year after its publication.

== Summary ==
For Schmitt, the political is reducible to the existential distinction between friend and enemy. This distinction arises from the fact of human diversity: identities and practices, beliefs and way of life can, in principle, be in conflict with one another.

Schmitt attacks the "liberal-neutralist" and "utopian" notions that politics can be removed of all warlike, agonistic energy, arguing conflict is embedded in existence itself, likewise constituting an ineradicable trait of anthropological human nature. Schmitt attempts to substantiate his ideas by referring to the declared anthropological pessimism of "realistic" Catholic theology. Schmitt considers the anti-perfectibilist pessimism of Traditional Catholic theology to be esoterically relevant to the inner ontological being of politics and political activity in the contemporary world, where modern people subconsciously secularize theological intellectual ideas and concerns. Schmitt criticizes political "radicals" as ignorant, deluded, pseudo-messianic in mentality, and oblivious to the stark, hard knowledge of unveiled human nature, its esse, encoded in ancient theology, wherein Original Sin held central, axial place, intertwining his own ideas of metapolitics with a reformulated "metaphysics of evil".

== Publication ==
The Concept of the Political was first published in 1932 by Duncker & Humblot (Munich). It was an elaboration of a journal article of the same title, published in 1927. According to authors such as Heinrich Meier, the 1932 version has significant, and controversial, revisions, likely made in response to the reaction of Leo Strauss. Some people have argued that this interpretation lacks credibility, and contrary to Meier's opinion, Karl Löwith argued that the revision from the second to the third edition was not a reaction to Strauss, but an opportunistic attempt following Schmitt's membership in the Nazi Party.

According to Reinhard Mehring, Schmitt's biographer, In The Concept of the Political, interpreted the "political" as the most intense of human relations, characterized by friend-enemy relations, "there is no underlying Catholic theme". According to Mehring, among the critics who were outraged by this work were Catholic theologians. Mehring questioned whether Schmitt's book actually had anything to do with Catholic doctrine.
