= Land and Sea: A World-Historical Meditation =

1942 book by Carl Schmitt

- Edition Maschke (1981 edition)
- Author: Carl Schmitt
- Original title: Land und Meer. Eine weltgeschichtliche Betrachtung
- Language: German
- Publisher: Reclam
- Publication date: 1942
- Publication place: Germany
- English publication date: 1997
- Pages: 76

Land and Sea: A World-Historical Meditation (German: Land und Meer. Eine weltgeschichtliche Betrachtung) is a 1942 book by the German writer Carl Schmitt. It is an analysis of spatiality and politics, especially as it relates to land powers and sea powers. Schmitt associated merchant and maritime power with the Biblical Leviathan, referring to the period of Britain and the United States as great powers as the Age of Leviathan, and argued that this type of rule is unstable because it cannot help being undermined by its own inner dynamics.

Along with The Nomos of the Earth (1950), Land and Sea is central in Schmtt's writings about space.

== See also ==
- Leviathan (Hobbes book)
