= Heinrich Meier =

German philosopher

Heinrich Meier (born 8 April 1953) is a German philosopher. He has published on subjects including political theology, Leo Strauss and Carl Schmitt. He led the Carl Friedrich von Siemens Foundation from 1985 to 2022.

== Career ==
As a young man, Meier was engaged in radical politics as a nationalist and as a socialist, but became disillusioned with both ideologies. He began his academic career with studies of Jean-Jacques Rousseau. He then came to focus on political theology, Friedrich Nietzsche and Leo Strauss.

Meier's book Carl Schmitt and Leo Strauss: The Hidden Dialogue (1988) is about the both open and private intellectual exchange between Carl Schmitt and Strauss. Meier argues that political theology is at the center of Schmitt's work and that his influence on Strauss was considerable.

In The Lesson of Carl Schmitt: Four Chapters on the Distinction between Political Theology and Political Philosophy (1994), Meier further analyses Schmitt as a political theologian.

Meier was the editor of Strauss' collected works in German. Meier's book Leo Strauss and the Theologico-Political Problem (2003) evaluates Strauss and his critics, with the aim of encouraging self-criticism among philosophers. The book argues that Strauss' main concern was never politics, but the conflict between reason and revelation.

== Reception and criticism ==
Robert Howse is critical of Meier's interpretation of the Schmitt–Strauss connection, arguing that Meier both exaggerates Schmitt's influence on Strauss and gives it an unfounded political dimension. Howse argues that the relationship between them was merely professional.

The interpretation of Heinrich Meier that characterizes the thought of Carl Schmitt primarily as a form of political theology has been questioned by Hugo Herrera. In Carl Schmitt between Technological Rationality and Theology (2020), Herrera argues that this thesis relies on a limited textual basis and does not sufficiently account for the broader argumentative structure of Schmitt’s work. According to Herrera, the passages cited by Meier do not conclusively demonstrate that Schmitt’s doctrine is grounded in theological premises. Herrera maintains that Schmitt’s reflections on the political rely extensively on philosophical-anthropological and philosophical-political arguments concerning conflict, existential seriousness, and the structure of political communities. Herrera further contends that Meier’s interpretation tends to privilege statements with theological resonance while giving less attention to passages in which Schmitt explicitly distances himself from theology or emphasizes the methodological autonomy of juridical thought. In this respect, Herrera argues that interpreting Schmitt primarily through the lens of political theology risks obscuring the broader hermeneutical framework within which Schmitt situates law as a distinct mode of understanding positioned between technological rationality and theology.

Contrary to Meier's interpretation, Karl Löwith argued that Schmitt's revision of The Concept of the Political was an opportunistic act in response to his involvement in Nazism.

From 1985 to 2022, Meier was the managing director of the Carl Friedrich von Siemens Foundation. Since 1999, he has taught as Honorarprofessor at LMU Munich.
