= Carl Schmitt =

German jurist and political philosopher (1888–1985)

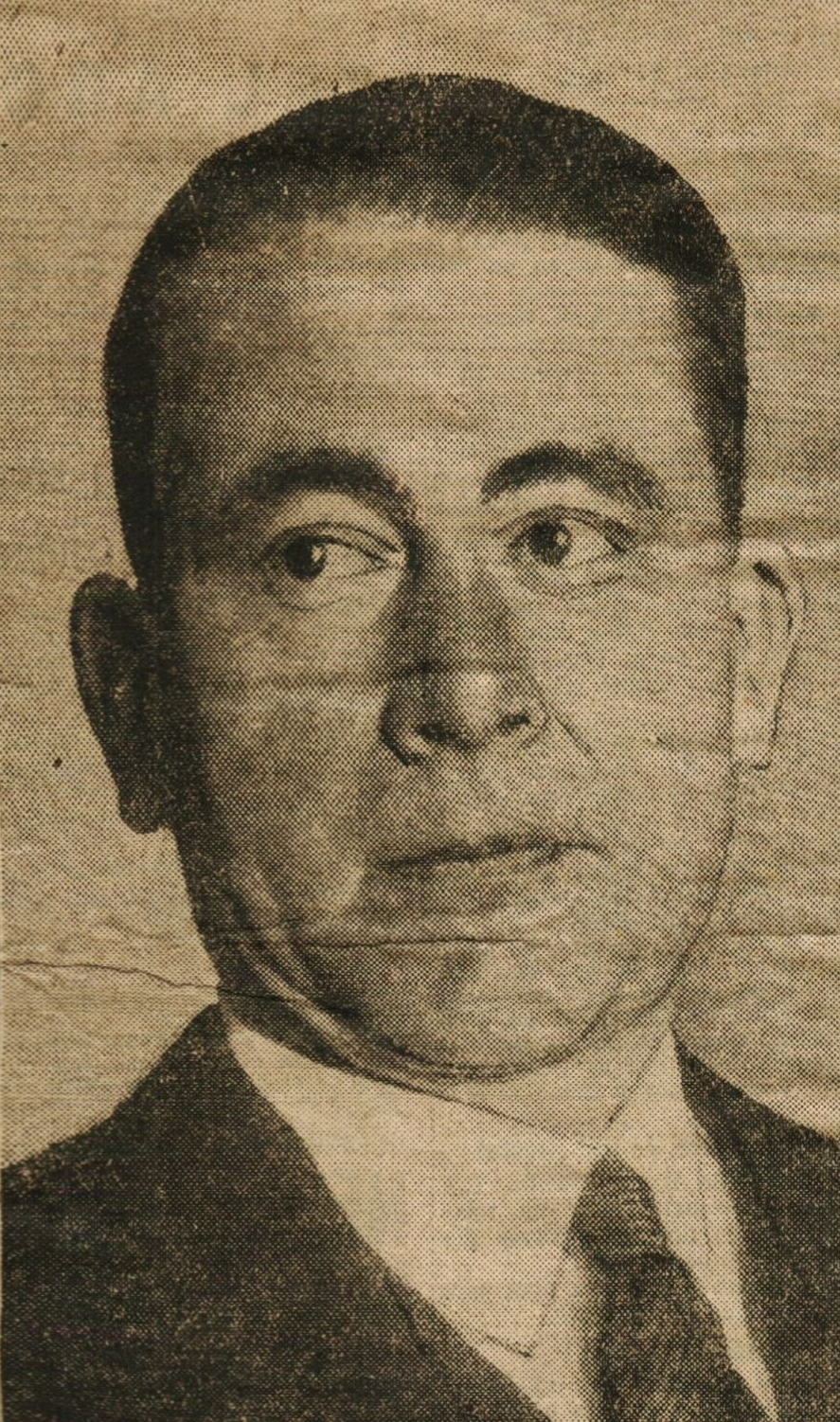
- Schmitt in 1929
- Born: 11 July 1888; Plettenberg, Prussia, German Empire
- Died: 7 April 1985 (aged 96); Plettenberg, North Rhine-Westphalia, West Germany
- Spouses: Pavla Dorotić (m. 1916); Duška Todorović (m. 1926; died 1950)
- Children: 1

Education
- Education: Friedrich Wilhelm University of Berlin; Ludwig-Maximilians-Universität München; University of Strasbourg (Dr. jur., 1910; Dr. habil., 1916)

Philosophical work
- Era: 20th-century philosophy
- Region: Western philosophy
- School: Continental philosophy; Conservative Revolution; Decisionism; IR realism
- Institutions: University of Greifswald (1921); University of Bonn (1921); Technical University of Munich (1928); University of Cologne (1933); Friedrich Wilhelm University of Berlin (1933–1945)
- Main interests: Politics; Jurisprudence; Constitutional law; Political theology; Philosophy of religion
- Notable ideas: State of exception; Friend–Enemy distinction; Sovereignty as a "borderline concept"; Legality–legitimacy distinction

Carl Schmitt (Note: /ʃmɪt/; German: [ʃmɪt]) (11 July 1888 – 7 April 1985) was a German jurist and political philosopher. An authoritarian conservative, he was noted as a critic of parliamentary democracy, liberalism, and cosmopolitanism.

In 1933, Schmitt joined the Nazi Party and used his legal and political theories to provide ideological justification for the regime. He held various positions on Nazi councils, including the Prussian State Council and the Academy for German Law, and served as president of the National Socialist Association of Legal Professionals. By 1936, he had lost favour among senior Nazi officials and was removed from most of his official positions within the party. Schmitt and his work remain controversial for their association with Nazism.

The Stanford Encyclopedia of Philosophy writes, "Schmitt was an acute observer and analyst of the weaknesses of liberal constitutionalism and liberal cosmopolitanism. But there can be little doubt that his preferred cure turned out to be infinitely worse than the disease." His ideas remain highly influential, with scholars arguing he has influenced modern governance in China and Russia, as well as various strands of modern American conservatism.

== Early life ==
Schmitt was born in Plettenberg, Westphalia, German Empire. His parents were Roman Catholics from the German Eifel region who had settled in Plettenberg. His father was a minor businessman. Schmitt had three siblings: Auguste, Joseph, and Anna Margarethe. He studied law at the Friedrich Wilhelm University of Berlin, the Ludwig-Maximilians-Universität München, and the University of Strasbourg between 1907 and 1910. He passed his first state law examination that same year. His 1910 doctoral thesis was titled Über Schuld und Schuldarten (On Guilt and Types of Guilt). In 1914, he obtained his habilitation at the University of Strasbourg with a thesis titled Der Wert des Staates und die Bedeutung des Einzelnen (The Value of the State and the Significance of the Individual). He completed a legal clerkship at the Düsseldorf Higher Regional Court and in February 1915 passed the Assessor examination.

Schmitt volunteered for service with the Bavarian Army in February 1915 and served in the First World War. He was discharged from the military on 1 July 1919. Returning to civilian life, he embarked on an academic career that led to teaching positions at the Technical University of Munich (1920), the University of Greifswald (1921), the University of Bonn (1922), the Technical University of Berlin (1928), the University of Cologne (1933), and the Friedrich Wilhelm University of Berlin (1933–1945).

Before his Nazi party involvement, Schmitt maintained many Jewish friends and colleagues. In 1932, he helped arrange for Leo Strauss to receive a grant from the Rockefeller Foundation but he avoided communicating with Strauss after joining the Nazi Party. Schmitt was also close with the Eisler family, a Jewish family that supported Schmitt financially during an impoverished period as a student. Georg Eisler and Georg's sister, who worked with his secretary remained close with Schmitt until 1933 when he suspended his relationship with the Eisler family.

== Academic career ==
While in Munich, Schmitt attended Max Weber's lectures, "Politics as a Vocation", "Science as a Vocation", and the General Economic History. In 1923, he contributed to the second volume of Melchior Palyi's Erinnerungsgabe für Max Weber.

In 1921, Schmitt became a professor at the University of Greifswald, where he published his essay Die Diktatur (On Dictatorship).

In 1922, he published Politische Theologie (Political Theology) while working as a professor at the University of Bonn. Schmitt changed universities in 1928, when he became professor of law at the Handelshochschule in Berlin, and again in 1933, when he accepted a position at the University of Cologne. His most famous paper, "Der Begriff des Politischen" ("The Concept of the Political"), was based on lectures at the Deutsche Hochschule für Politik in Berlin.

In 1932, Schmitt was counsel for the Reich government in the case Preussen contra Reich (Prussia vs. Reich), in which the SPD-controlled government of Prussia disputed its dismissal by the right-wing Reich government of Franz von Papen. Papen was motivated by the fact that Prussia, by far the largest state in Germany, served as a powerful base for the political left and provided it with institutional power, particularly in the form of the Prussian police. Schmitt, Carl Bilfinger, and Erwin Jacobi represented the Reich, and one of the counsel for the Prussian government was Hermann Heller. In October 1932, the court ruled that the Prussian government had been suspended unlawfully but that the Reich had the right to install a commissar. In German history, the struggle that resulted in the de facto destruction of federalism in the Weimar Republic is known as the Preußenschlag.

== Views ==
=== Religion ===
As a young man, Schmitt was "a devoted Catholic until his break with the church in the mid twenties". From around the end of World War I, he began to describe his Catholicism as "displaced" and "de-totalised". N. S. Lyons claims that something in Schmitt's interior life seems to have begun to shift around 1914, when his diary entries started to hint at a crisis of faith. According to Lyons, it was his troubled relationships with women that estranged him from the Faith.

According to political theorist Reinhard Mehring, Schmitt's involvement with Catholicism was mostly political rather than motivated by genuine belief in Catholic doctrine. He was known to be fond of the hierarchical structure and Roman law of the Catholic Church. Despite his lack of belief his works such as Political theology and Roman catholicism and Political form were heavily influenced by Catholicism. In his 1922 work Political theology, he argues that "All significant concepts of the modern theory of the state are secularized theological concepts". Schmitt particularly cites the idea of an all-powerful state or government is a secularized version of an all-powerful God. He also frequently quoted and was influenced by Christian thinkers such as Søren Kierkegaard, Juan Donoso Cortés, Martin Luther, John Calvin and Thomas Hobbes.

=== Emergency powers ===
Schmitt's "state of exception" doctrine has enjoyed a revival in the 21st century. In his 1921 work The Dictatorship, he advocated for giving a state absolute power during crises and argued the law should not apply during times of emergency. Formulated 10 years before the 1933 Nazi takeover of Germany, Schmitt claimed that urgency justified the following:

1. Special executive powers
2. Suspension of the Rule of Law
3. Derogation of legal and constitutional rights

Schmitt's doctrine helped clear the way for Hitler's rise to power by providing the theoretical legal foundation of the Nazi regime.

=== Support for the Nazi Party ===
On 31 January 1933, Schmitt remarked that with Adolf Hitler's appointment as Chancellor, "one can say that 'Hegel died.'" Richard Wolin observes:

[I]t is Hegel qua philosopher of the "bureaucratic class" or Beamtenstaat that has been definitely surpassed with Hitler's triumph ... this class of civil servants—which Hegel in the Rechtsphilosophie deems the "universal class"—represents an impermissible drag on the sovereignty of executive authority. For Schmitt ... the very essence of the bureaucratic conduct of business is reverence for the norm, a standpoint that could not but exist in great tension with the doctrines of Carl Schmitt ... Hegel had set an ignominious precedent by according this putative universal class a position of preeminence in his political thought, insofar as the primacy of the bureaucracy tends to diminish or supplant the prerogative of sovereign authority.

The Nazis engineered the passage of the Enabling Act of 1933 in March, which changed the Weimar Constitution to allow the "present government" to rule by decree, bypassing both the President, Paul von Hindenburg, and the Reichstag.

Alfred Hugenberg, the leader of the German National People's Party, one of the Nazis' partners in the coalition government that was being squeezed out of existence, hoped to slow the Nazi takeover of the country by threatening to quit his cabinet position. Hugenberg reasoned that by doing so, the government would be changed, and the Enabling Act would no longer apply, as the "present government" would no longer exist. A legal opinion by Schmitt prevented this manoeuvre from succeeding. Well known at the time as a constitutional theorist, Schmitt declared that "present government" did not refer to the cabinet's makeup when the act was passed, but to the "completely different kind of government"—that is, different from the democracy of the Weimar Republic—that the Hitler cabinet had brought into existence.

Schmitt was the presiding legal expert at meetings during the early stages of the Third Reich that resulted in a formal decision to bypass the process of formulating a new constitution. An approach that would nominally maintain the former constitution was adopted, even though the Führerprinzip (Leader Principle) was given transcendent supra-legal status. Schmitt claimed that the adoption of the Leader Principle in place of a legal constitution was legitimized by the presumed "Völkisch" or racial composition of the German people and their identification with Hitler.

Schmitt joined the Nazi Party on 1 May 1933. Within days, he rejoiced in the burning of Jewish authors' "un-German" and "anti-German" writings and called for a much more extensive purge, to include works by authors influenced by "Jewish" ideas. From June 1933, he was in the leadership council of Hans Frank's Academy for German Law and chaired the Committee for State and Administrative Law. In July, Hermann Göring appointed him to the Prussian State Council, and in November he became the president of the Association of National Socialist German Jurists. He also replaced Heller as a professor at the University of Berlin, a position he held until the end of World War II. He presented his theories as an ideological foundation of the Nazi dictatorship and a justification of the Führer state concerning legal philosophy, particularly through the concept of auctoritas.

In June 1934, Schmitt was appointed editor-in-chief of the Nazi newspaper for lawyers, the Deutsche Juristen-Zeitung ("German Jurists' Journal"). In July he published in it "The Leader Protects the Law (Der Führer schützt das Recht)", a justification of the political murders of the Night of the Long Knives with Hitler's authority as the "highest form of administrative justice (höchste Form administrativer Justiz)". Schmitt presented himself as a radical antisemite and chaired an October 1936 law teachers' convention in Berlin at which he demanded that German law be cleansed of the "Jewish spirit (jüdischem Geist)" and that all Jewish scientists' publications be marked with a small symbol.

Nevertheless, in December 1936, the Schutzstaffel (SS) publication Das Schwarze Korps accused Schmitt of being an opportunist, a Hegelian state thinker, and a Catholic, and called his antisemitism a mere pretense, citing earlier statements in which he criticized the Nazis' racial theories. After this, Schmitt resigned as Reichsfachgruppenleiter (Reich Professional Group Leader) but retained his professorship in Berlin and his title "Prussian State Councillor". Schmitt continued to be investigated in 1937, but Göring stopped further reprisals.

During the German occupation of Paris, a "round-table" of French and German intellectuals met at the Georges V Hotel, including Schmitt, the writers Ernst Jünger, Paul Morand, Jean Cocteau, and Henry de Montherlant, and the publisher Gaston Gallimard.

== After World War II ==
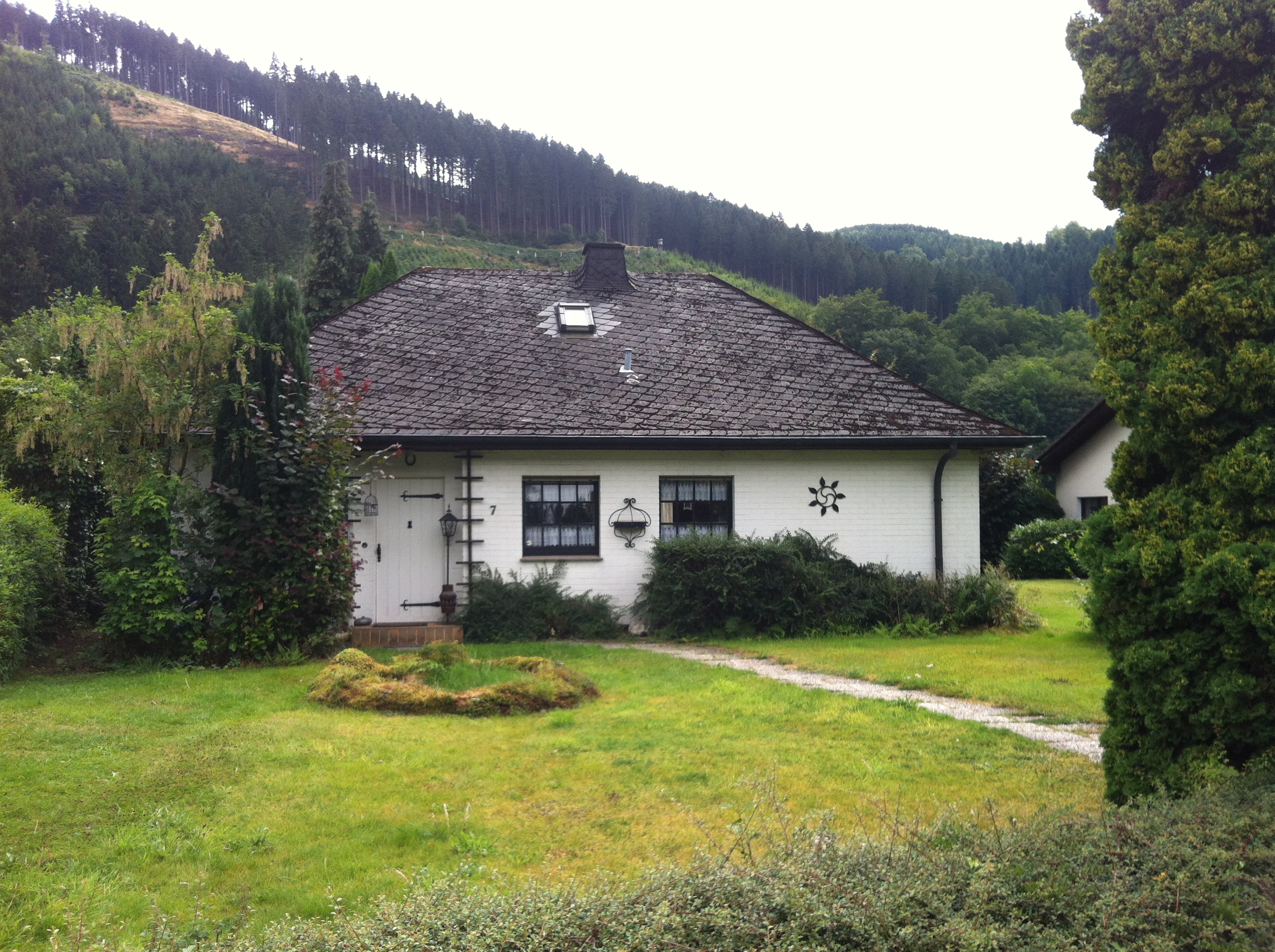
"San Casciano", home of Carl Schmitt in Plettenberg-Pasel from 1971 until 1985

In 1945, US forces captured Schmitt and, after spending more than a year in an internment camp, he returned to Plettenberg and, later, to his housekeeper Anni Stand's residence in Plettenberg-Pasel. He remained unrepentant for his role in the creation of the Nazi state and, refusing every attempt at denazification, was barred from academic jobs. Despite being isolated from the mainstream of the scholarly and political community, from the 1950s on, he continued his studies, especially of international law, and frequently received visitors, both colleagues and younger intellectuals, well into his old age. Among the visitors were Ernst Jünger, Jacob Taubes, and Alexandre Kojève.

In 1962, Schmitt gave lectures in Francoist Spain, two of which resulted in the 1963 publication of Theory of the Partisan, in which he called the Spanish Civil War a "war of national liberation" against "international Communism". Schmitt regarded the partisan as a specific and significant phenomenon that, in the latter half of the 20th century, indicated the emergence of a new theory of warfare.

== Publications ==
Schmitt contended that political representation in a liberal democracy was an empty formula, and that the mystical nature and personalist ideal of the Catholic sovereign was essential for effective sovereignty.

=== The Dictatorship ===
In his essay Die Diktatur ("The Dictatorship"), he discussed the foundations of the newly established Weimar Republic, emphasising the office of the President of Germany. Schmitt analyzed what he saw as the effective and ineffective elements of his country's new constitution. He saw the office of the president as a comparatively effective element, because of the power granted to the president to declare a state of exception (Ausnahmezustand). This power, which Schmitt discussed and implicitly praised as dictatorial, was more in line with the underlying mentality of executive power than the comparatively slow and ineffective processes of legislative power reached through parliamentary discussion and compromise.

Schmitt was at pains to remove what he saw as a taboo surrounding the concept of "dictatorship" and to show that the concept is implicit whenever power is wielded by means other than the slow processes of parliamentary politics and the bureaucracy:

If the constitution of a state is democratic, then every exceptional negation of democratic principles, every exercise of state power independent of the approval of the majority, can be called dictatorship.

For Schmitt, every government capable of decisive action must include a dictatorial element within its constitution. Although the German concept of Ausnahmezustand is best translated as "state of emergency", it literally means "state of exception", which, according to Schmitt, frees the executive from all normal legal restraints on its power. The concept of "exception" is crucial: Schmitt defines sovereignty as the power to decide to institute a state of exception, as Giorgio Agamben has noted.

Here, Schmitt introduces the term "commissarial dictatorship", or the declaration of a state of exception to save the existing state of affairs. Where the commissarial dictatorship acts within the constitution through constitutional right (for example in Article 48 of the Weimar constitution), the sovereign dictatorship, as the pouvoir constituant, rather "seeks to create a condition in order to make possible a constitution that it regards as the true constitution" without any pretense of legal justification.

=== Political Theology ===
On Dictatorship was followed by the 1922 essay Politische Theologie (political theology); in it, Schmitt gives further substance to his authoritarian theories with the now notorious definition: "The sovereign is he who decides on the exception." By "exception", Schmitt means stepping outside the rule of law under the state of exception (Ausnahmezustand) doctrine he first introduced in On Dictatorship for the purpose of managing crisis, which Schmitt defines loosely as "a case of extreme peril, a danger to the existence of the state, or the like." For this reason, the "exception" is understood as a "borderline concept" for Schmitt because it is not within the purview of the normal legal order. Schmitt opposes this definition of sovereignty to those offered by contemporary theorists on the issue, particularly Hans Kelsen, whose work Schmitt repeatedly criticizes in the essay. The state of exception is a critique of "normativism", a positivist concept of law developed by Kelsen as the expression of norms that are abstract and generally applicable, in all circumstances.

A year later, Schmitt supported the emergence of totalitarian power structures in his paper "Die geistesgeschichtliche Lage des heutigen Parlamentarismus" (roughly: "The Intellectual-Historical Situation of Today's Parliamentarianism", translated as The Crisis of Parliamentary Democracy by Ellen Kennedy). Schmitt criticized the institutional practices of liberal politics, arguing that they are justified by faith in rational discussion and openness that is at odds with actual parliamentary party politics, in which outcomes are hammered out in smoke-filled rooms by party leaders. Schmitt also posits an essential division between the liberal doctrine of separation of powers and what he holds to be the nature of democracy itself, the identity of the rulers and the ruled. Although many critics of Schmitt today, such as Stephen Holmes in his The Anatomy of Anti-Liberalism, take exception to his fundamentally authoritarian outlook, the idea of incompatibility between liberalism and democracy is one reason for the continued interest in his political philosophy.

In chapter 4 of his State of Exception (2005), Italian philosopher Giorgio Agamben argued that Schmitt's Political Theology ought to be read as a response to Walter Benjamin's influential essay Critique of Violence.

The book's title derives from Schmitt's assertion (in chapter 3) that "all significant concepts of the modern theory of the state are secularized theological concepts"—in other words, that political theory addresses the state (and sovereignty) in much the same manner as theology does God.

=== The Concept of the Political ===
For Schmitt, "the political" is not equal to any other domain, such as the economic (which distinguishes between profitable and not profitable), but instead is the most essential to identity. While churches are predominant in religion or society is predominant in economics, and the state is usually predominant in politics. Yet, for Schmitt, the political was not autonomous or equivalent to the other domains, but rather the existential basis that would determine any other domain should it reach the point of politics (e.g. religion ceases to be merely theological when it makes a clear distinction between the "friend" and the "enemy").

He views political concepts and images as inherently contestable. Hegemonic powers seek to control and direct how political concepts are applied for a purpose and to effect an outcome such as making the enemy knowable and, in all cases, intended to manifest the inclusive and exclusive aspects of the social order represented by the political words and symbolism:

All political concepts, images, and terms have a polemical meaning. They are focused on a specific conflict and are bound to a concrete situation; the result (which manifests itself in war or revolution) is a friend–enemy grouping, and they turn into empty and ghostlike abstractions when this situation disappears. Words such as state, republic, society, class, as well as sovereignty, constitutional state, absolutism, dictatorship, economic planning, neutral or total state, and so on, are incomprehensible if one does not know exactly who is to be affected, combated, refuted, or negated by such a term.

Schmitt, in perhaps his best-known formulation, bases his conceptual realm of state sovereignty and autonomy upon the distinction between friend and enemy. Schmitt writes:

The political enemy need not be morally evil or aesthetically ugly… But he is, nevertheless, the other, the stranger ...

This distinction is to be determined "existentially", which is to say that the enemy is whoever is "in a specially intense way, existentially something different and alien, so that in the extreme case conflicts with him are possible". Such an enemy need not even be based on nationality: so long as the conflict is potentially intense enough to become a violent one between political entities, the actual substance of enmity may be anything. In this work, Schmitt makes the distinction between several different types of enemies one may make, stating that political enemies ought to be made out of a legitimate concern for the safety of the state rather than moral intuitions.

The collectivization of friendship and enmity is, for Schmitt, the essence of politics. This theory of politics was influential in the Third Reich where the recognition and eradication of the enemy became a necessary component of the collective national identity. Similar views were shared by other Nazi legal theorists like Werner Best. Although there have been divergent interpretations concerning this work, there is broad agreement that The Concept of the Political is an attempt to achieve state unity by defining the content of politics as opposition to the "enemy". Additionally, the prominence of the state stands as an arbitrary force dominating potentially fractious civil society, whose various antagonisms must not be allowed to affect politics, lest civil war result.

==== Dialogue with Leo Strauss ====
According to Heinrich Meier, Schmitt provided a positive reference for Leo Strauss, and approved his work, which was instrumental in winning Strauss the scholarship funding that allowed him to leave Germany. In turn, Strauss's critique and clarifications of The Concept of the Political led Schmitt to make significant emendations in its second edition. Writing to Schmitt during 1932, Strauss summarized Schmitt's political theology thus: "[B]ecause man is by nature evil, he therefore needs dominion. But dominion can be established, that is, men can be unified only in a unity against—against other men. Every association of men is necessarily a separation from other men… the political, thus understood, is not the constitutive principle of the state, of order, but a condition of the state." However, Robert Howse has argued that this interpretation of Heinrich Meier is exaggerated and unfounded, and that there is no proper basis for the idea that Strauss's critique had a major influence on Schmitt.

==== Debate over political theology ====
A significant strand of scholarship has interpreted Carl Schmitt’s thought in theological terms. The political philosopher Heinrich Meier has argued that Schmitt’s doctrine should be understood primarily as a form of political theology grounded in revelation rather than philosophical reasoning.

Other scholars have questioned this interpretation. Hugo E. Herrera argues that reducing Schmitt’s thought to political theology overlooks important philosophical-anthropological and juridical dimensions of his work.

According to Herrera, Schmitt’s reflections on the political rely extensively on philosophical arguments concerning conflict, existential seriousness, and the relation between rule and case. From this perspective, Schmitt situates juridical thought between technological rationality and theology, rather than grounding politics directly in theological premises.

Herrera further maintains that Schmitt’s analyses of decision, exception, and judgment develop a form of reasoning that mediates between rule and case and remains oriented toward concrete situations, rather than toward calculability or technical control.

In his analysis of Schmitt's thought, philosopher Karl Löwith interprets the changes that occurred between the second and third editions of The Concept of the Political as unrelated to the influence of Leo Strauss. Rather, he sees these revisions as responses to the political demands of the time and as the result of Schmitt's opportunistic adjustment of his position to accommodate the Nazi regime.

=== Political Romanticism ===
Schmitt's Political Romanticism (1926) contains Schmitt's critique of Romantic conservatism, which he considers unrealistic for the modern political arena, as it only fantasizes about restoring the ancien régime. Distancing himself from the tradition of legitimist "restorative conservatives" such as Adam Müller or Joseph de Maistre, Schmitt instead champions the thought of the 19th century Spanish reactionary thinker Juan Donoso Cortés, who advocated for a dictatorship.

According to György Lukács, this text is both the starting point of Schmitt's advocacy for a politics of realism and his extreme anti-humanism. Lukács quotes Schmitt's comment that Cortes's "great theoretical significance for the history of counter-revolutionary theory lies in [that] his contempt for human beings knew no bounds; their blind understanding, their feeble wills, the derisory elan of their carnal desires seem so pitiful to him that all the vocabulary of all human languages is not sufficient to express the full baseness of these creatures." Lukács writes:

Here we clearly perceive Schmitt's association with all anti-human tendencies, past and present, along with the reason for it in socio-human terms: he is an enemy of the masses grown blind with hatred, a fanatic in the campaign against Vermassung or mass feeling.

=== The Leviathan in the State Theory of Thomas Hobbes ===
The Leviathan in the State Theory of Thomas Hobbes, with the subtitle "Meaning and Failure of a Political Symbol", is a 1938 work by Schmitt that revisits one of his most critical theoretical inspirations: Thomas Hobbes. Schmitt's work can be described as both a critique and an appraisal of the controversial political theorist. This work also contains some of Schmitt's more antisemitic language. As contemporary writers on Schmitt have noted, his antisemitism may be read as more a kind of "anti-Judaism" as, unlike his Nazi allies, he did not attribute the dangers of Judaism to "biological" reasons but strictly religious ones. This work by Schmitt is also one of the most intimately involved by him with the concept of myth in a political setting.

The text itself begins with an overview of the religious history of the mythical character "Leviathan". Schmitt traces this character as a unique subject of conflicting interpretations in Abrahamic doctrines, whereby the Leviathan, understood most pointedly as a "big fish," is occasionally interchangeable with that of a dragon or serpent, which Schmitt remarks have been "protective and benevolent deities" in the history of non-Jewish peoples. But, as Schmitt makes clear, Hobbes' Leviathan is very different from these interpretations, being illustrated firstly in his work Leviathan as a "huge man". The Leviathan as a "huge man" is used throughout Hobbes' work as a symbol of the sovereign person. Although the Leviathan is not the only allegory made by Hobbes of the sovereign, which gravitates throughout his work as "a huge man, a huge leviathan, an artificial being, an animal artificiale, an automaton, or a machina". Hobbes' concern was mainly to convey the sovereign person as a frightening creature that could instill fear into those chaotic elements of man that belong to his interpretation of the state of nature.

Schmitt's critique of Hobbes begins with Hobbes' understanding of the state as a "machine" which is set into motion by the sovereign. That, according to Schmitt, is actually a continuation of René Descartes's concept of mind–body dualism. For Hobbes to conceptualize the state as a machine whose soul is the sovereign renders it really as just a mechanic structure, carrying over the cartesian dualism into political theory: "As a totality, the state is body and soul, a homo artificialis, and, as such, a machine. It is a manmade product ... the soul thereby becomes a mere component of a machine artificially manufactured by man." Schmitt adds that this technical conception of the state is essential in the modern interpretation of government as a widespread administrative organ. (Note: The concept of the "administrative state" is elaborated by Schmitt in his other works such as Legality and Legitimacy as a technical interpretation of state activity that is excessively bureaucratic and wherein all disputes of the state can be settled through "more proper" or "more perfect" management.) Therefore, Schmitt attributes Hobbes' mechanistic and often also a legally positivist interpretation of the state (what is legitimate = what is legal) with the process of political neutralization. This is consistent with Schmitt's larger attitude toward attempts to apply technical principles to political matters.

Also, Schmitt critiques Hobbes' insistence that belief in miracles must only be outwardly consistent with the position of the state and can, privately, deviate into one's own opinion as to the validity of such "miracles". The belief in miracles was a relevant point in Hobbes' century, for kings would regularly "bestow miracles" by touching the hands of those of ill health, supposedly healing them—obviously a consequence of the medieval belief that kings had a divine character. Hobbes' position was that "private reason" may disagree with what the state claims to be a miracle, but the "public reason" must, by necessity, agree to its position in order to avoid chaos. Schmitt's critique of Hobbes here is twofold. Firstly, Hobbes opens the crack toward a liberal understanding of individual rights (such as the right to "private reason") which Schmitt was a tireless critic of and, secondly, Hobbes guts the state of any "substantive truth" (such as the genuine belief of the individual, even in private, of the king's divine right) and renders the state into now simply a "justifiable external power". This opens up the elementary basis of liberal society, which, for Schmitt, was pluralism. Such a pluralist society lacked ideological homogeneity and nationally bound group identity, both of which were fundamental premises of a democratic society to Schmitt. Despite his critiques, Schmitt, nonetheless, finishes the book with a celebration of Hobbes as a truly magnificent thinker, ranking him along with other theorists he values greatly like Niccolò Machiavelli and Giambattista Vico.

=== The Nomos of the Earth ===
The Nomos of the Earth is Schmitt's most historical and geopolitical work. Published in 1950, it was also one of his final texts. It describes the origin of the Eurocentric global order, which Schmitt dates from the discovery of the New World, discusses its specific character and its contribution to civilization, analyses the reasons for its decline at the end of the 19th century, and concludes with prospects for a new world order. It defends European achievements, not only in creating the first truly global order of international law, but also in limiting war to conflicts among sovereign states, which, in effect, civilized war. In Schmitt's view, the European sovereign state was the greatest achievement of Occidental rationalism; in becoming the principal agency of secularization, the European state created the modern age.

Notable in Schmitt's discussion of the European epoch of world history is the role played by the New World, which ultimately replaced the Old World as the centre of the Earth and became the arbiter in European and world politics. According to Schmitt, the United States' internal conflicts between economic presence and political absence, between isolationism and interventionism, are global problems, which today continue to hamper the creation of a new world order. However critical Schmitt is of American actions at the end of the 19th century and after World War I, he considered the United States to be the only political entity capable of resolving the crisis of global order. Since 1942, Schmitt envisaged the nomos of the New World installing itself "upon the ruins" of the Old.

=== Hamlet or Hecuba ===
Published in 1956, Hamlet or Hecuba: The Intrusion of the Time into the Play was Schmitt's most extended piece of literary criticism. In it, Schmitt focuses his attention on Shakespeare's Hamlet and argues that the significance of the work hinges on its ability to integrate history in the form of the taboo of the queen and the deformation of the figure of the avenger. Schmitt uses this interpretation to develop a theory of myth and politics that serves as a cultural foundation for his concept of political representation. Beyond literary criticism or historical analysis, Schmitt's book also reveals a comprehensive theory of the relationship between aesthetics and politics that responds to alternative ideas developed by Walter Benjamin and Theodor W. Adorno.

=== Theory of the Partisan ===
Schmitt's Theory of the Partisan originated in two lectures delivered during 1962, and has been seen as a rethinking of The Concept of the Political. It addressed the transformation of war in the post-European age, analysing a specific and significant phenomenon that ushered in a new theory of war and enmity. It contains an implicit theory of the terrorist, which during the 21st century has resulted in yet another new theory of war and enmity. In the lectures, Schmitt directly tackles the issues surrounding "the problem of the Partisan" figure: the guerrilla or revolutionary who "fights irregularly" (p. 3). Both because of its scope, with extended discussions on historical figures like Napoleon, Vladimir Lenin, and Mao Zedong, as well as the events marking the beginning of the 20th century, Schmitt's text has had a resurgence of popularity. Jacques Derrida, in his Politics of Friendship remarked:

Despite certain signs of ironic distrust in the areas of metaphysics and ontology, The Concept of the Political was, as we have seen, a philosophical type of essay to 'frame' the topic of a concept unable to constitute itself on philosophical ground. But in Theory of the Partisan, it is in the same areas that the topic of this concept is both radicalized and properly uprooted, where Schmitt wished to regrasp in history the event or node of events that engaged this uprooting radicalization, and it is precisely there that the philosophical as such intervenes again.

Schmitt concludes Theory of the Partisan with the statement: "The theory of the partisan flows into the question of the concept of the political, into the question of the real enemy and of a new nomos of the earth." Schmitt's work on the Partisan has since spurred comparisons with the post-9/11 'terrorist' in recent scholarship. The Italian philosopher Domenico Losurdo comments:

Thus, for Schmitt, the colonized peoples' struggle for national independence, although embracing ever larger sections of the population, becomes synonymous with terrorism, while the actions of the occupying army, foreign and hated by the citizens of the occupied country, are characterized as "counter-terrorist". Of course, the "retaliations" can be very harsh, but – Schmitt observes, referring to Algeria and Vietnam – we must take into account the "irresistible logic of the old rule according to which insurgents can only be dealt with by insurgent methods." As we see, the main difference between terrorism and counter-terrorism is not a specific behavior (ie. the impact on, or participation of, citizens). It coincides with the border between barbarism and civilization, between East and West. The power that determines who the barbarians are every time also determines who the terrorists are.

== Personal life ==
According to biographers such as Reinhard Mehring, Schmitt's private life was deeply troubled and distressed by extreme antisemitism, self-destructive and compulsive sexuality, and a deep resentment of bourgeois life. This is said to have had a profound impact on his activities.

In 1916, Schmitt married his first wife, Pavla Dorotić, a Croatian woman who pretended to be a countess. They divorced, but an annulment was not granted by a Catholic tribunal, so his 1926 marriage to Duška Todorović, a Serbian woman, was not deemed valid under Catholic law. Schmitt and Todorović had a daughter, Anima, who in 1957 married Alfonso Otero Varela, a Spanish law professor at the University of Santiago de Compostela and a member of the ruling FET y de las JONS party in Francoist Spain. She translated several of her father's works into Spanish. Letters from Schmitt to his son-in-law have been published.

Schmitt had numerous extramarital affairs. He also kept a journal that graphically detailed his sexual experiences. In 1928, he reportedly watched The Passion of Joan of Arc a dozen times and, on several occasions in Berlin and Rome, picked up prostitutes to watch with him. He reportedly had an affair with the English teacher Kathleen Murray while his divorce from Dorotić was still pending and had multiple affairs during his second marriage to Todorović.

Schmitt died on 7 April 1985 and is buried in Plettenberg.

== Influence ==
Through Walter Benjamin, Giorgio Agamben, Andrew Arato, Chantal Mouffe and other writers, Schmitt has become a common reference in recent writings of the intellectual left as well as the right. These discussions concern not only the interpretation of Schmitt's own positions but also matters relevant to contemporary politics: the idea that laws of the state cannot strictly limit actions of its sovereign, the problem of a "state of exception" (later expanded upon by Agamben).

Schmitt's argument that political concepts are secularized theological concepts has also recently been seen as consequential for those interested in contemporary political theology. The philosopher Jacob Taubes, for example, engaged Schmitt widely in his 2004 study of Saint Paul, The Political Theology of Paul. Taubes' understanding of political theology is very different from Schmitt's, and emphasizes the political aspect of theological claims rather than the religious derivation of political claims.

Schmitt is described as a "classic of political thought" by Herfried Münkler, while in the same article Münkler speaks of his postwar writings as reflecting an "embittered, jealous, occasionally malicious man" ("verbitterten, eifersüchtigen, gelegentlich bösartigen Mann"). Schmitt was termed the "Crown Jurist of the Third Reich" ("Kronjurist des Dritten Reiches") by Waldemar Gurian.

According to historian Renato Cristi in the writing of the 1980 Constitution of Chile, Pinochet collaborator Jaime Guzmán based his work on the pouvoir constituant concept used by Schmitt (as well as drawing inspiration in the ideas of market society of Friedrich Hayek). This way Guzmán would have enabled a framework for a dictatorial state combined with a free market economic system.

Schmitt's anti-parliamentarian political theory received renewed attention as a historical reference with immediate contemporary relevance during the electoral cycles and administrations of the U.S. President Donald Trump.

=== China ===
Some have argued that Schmitt has become an important influence on Chinese political theory in the 21st century, particularly since Xi Jinping became General Secretary of the Chinese Communist Party in 2012. Leading Chinese Schmittians include the theologian Liu Xiaofeng, the public policy scholar Wang Shaoguang, and the legal theorist and government adviser Jiang Shigong. Schmitt's ideas have proved popular and useful instruments in justifying the legitimacy of Chinese Communist Party rule.

The first important wave of Schmitt's reception in China started with Liu's writings at the end of the 1990s. In the context of a transition period, Schmitt was used both by liberal, nationalist and conservative intellectuals to find answers to contemporary issues. In the 21st century, most of them are still concerned with state power and to what extent a strong state is required to tackle China's modernization. Some authors consider Schmitt's works as a weapon against liberalism. Others think that his theories are helpful for China's development.

A critical reception of his use in a Chinese context also exists. These differences go together with different interpretations of Schmitt's relation with fascism. While some scholars regard him as a faithful follower of fascism, others, such as Liu Xiaofeng, consider his support for the Nazi regime only as instrumental and attempt to separate his works from their historical context. According to them, his real goal is to pave a different and unique way for the modernization of Germany—precisely what makes him interesting for China. Generally speaking, the Chinese reception is ambivalent: quite diverse and dynamic, but also highly ideological. Other scholars are cautious when it comes to Schmitt's arguments for state power, considering the danger of totalitarianism, they assume at the same time that state power is necessary for the current transition and that a "dogmatic faith" in liberalism is unsuitable for China. By emphasizing the danger of social chaos, many of them agree with Schmitt—beyond their differences—on the necessity of a strong state.

=== Other countries ===
Among other things, his work is considered to have influenced neoconservatism in the United States. Most notably the legal opinions offered by Alberto Gonzales, John Yoo et al. by invoking the unitary executive theory to justify the Bush administration's legally controversial decisions during the war on terror (such as introducing unlawful combatant status which purportedly would eliminate protection by the Geneva Conventions, the Abu Ghraib torture and prisoner abuse, the National Security Agency's electronic surveillance program and various excesses of the Patriot Act) mimic his writings. David Luban points out that the American legal database Lexis.com has five references to Schmitt in the period between 1980 and 1990, 114 between 1990 and 2000, and 420 between 2000 and 2010, with almost twice as many in the last five years of the 2000s decade as the first five.

Several scholars have noted Schmitt's influence on Vladimir Putin and Russia, specifically in defence of illiberal norms and exercising power, such as in disputes with Ukraine. Timothy Snyder has asserted that Schmitt's work has greatly influenced Eurasianist philosophy in Russia by revealing a counter to the liberal order. Nomma Zarubina, who was accused by the FBI of being a secret operative of Russia's Federal Security Service (FSB), said in an interview that her father named her "Nomma" after Schmitt's work The Nomos of the Earth.

== Works ==
Some of Schmitt's major works are:

- Political Theology: Four Chapters on the Concept of Sovereignty (1922)
- The Crisis of Parliamentary Democracy (1923)
- The Concept of the Political (1932)
- Die Wendung zum diskriminierenden Kriegsbegriff (1938)
- Land and Sea: A World-Historical Meditation (1942)
- Ex Captivitate Salus (1950)
- The Nomos of the Earth (1950)
- Hamlet or Hecuba: The Intrusion of the Time into the Play (1956)
- Theory of the Partisan: Intermediate Commentary on the Concept of the Political (1963)
- Political Theology 2 (1970)

== See also ==
- Streitbare Demokratie
- German nationalism
