= Saul Bellow bibliography =

This is a bibliography of works by Saul Bellow.

== Fiction ==
=== Novels and novellas ===
Title	Year	Notes	LOA volume	Ref.
Dangling Man	1944		Novels 1944-1953	
The Victim	1947		Novels 1944-1953	
The Adventures of Augie March	1953	Won the 1954 National Book Award for Fiction	Novels 1944-1953	
Seize the Day	1956		Novels 1956-1964	
Henderson the Rain King	1959		Novels 1956-1964	
Herzog	1964	Won the 1965 National Book Award for Fiction	Novels 1956-1964	
Mr. Sammler's Planet	1970	Won the 1971 National Book Award for Fiction	Novels 1970-1982	
Humboldt's Gift	1975	Won the 1976 Pulitzer Prize for Fiction	Novels 1970-1982	
The Dean's December	1982		Novels 1970-1982	
What Kind of Day Did You Have?	1984	Collected in Him with His Foot in His Mouth and Other Stories; Collected Stories	Novels 1984-2000	
More Die of Heartbreak	1987		Novels 1984-2000	
A Theft	1989	Collected in Something to Remember Me By: Three Tales; Collected Stories	Novels 1984-2000	
The Bellarosa Connection	1989	Collected in Something to Remember Me By: Three Tales; Collected Stories	Novels 1984-2000	
The Actual	1997		Novels 1984-2000	
Ravelstein	2000		Novels 1984-2000	

=== Short stories ===
Title	Original publication	Collected in:
Two Morning Monologues	Partisan Review, May-June 1941	
The Mexican General	Partisan Review, May-June 1942	
Sermon by Doctor Pep	Partisan Review, May-June 1949	
Dora	Harper's Bazaar, Nov. 1949	
Trip to Galena	Partisan Review, Nov.-Dec. 1950	
Looking for Mr. Green	Commentary, Mar. 1951	Mosby's Memoirs and Other Stories; Collected Stories
By the Rock	Harper's Bazaar, Apr. 1951	
Address by Gooley Mac Dowell to the Hasbeens Club of Chicago	Hudson Review, Summer 1951	
The Gonzaga Manuscripts	Discovery, 1954	Mosby's Memoirs and Other Stories
A Father-To-Be	The New Yorker, Feb. 1955	Mosby's Memoirs and Other Stories
Leaving the Yellow House	Esquire, Jan. 1958	Mosby's Memoirs and Other Stories; Collected Stories
The Old System	Playboy, Jan. 1968	Mosby's Memoirs and Other Stories; Collected Stories
Mosby's Memoirs	The New Yorker, Jul. 1968	Mosby's Memoirs and Other Stories; Collected Stories
Zetland: By a Character Witness	Modern Occasions, 1974	Him with His Foot in His Mouth and Other Stories; Collected Stories
A Silver Dish	The New Yorker, Sep. 1978	Him with His Foot in His Mouth and Other Stories; Collected Stories
Him with His Foot in His Mouth	The Atlantic Monthly, Nov. 1982	Him with His Foot in His Mouth and Other Stories; Collected Stories
Cousins	-	Him with His Foot in His Mouth and Other Stories; Collected Stories
Something to Remember Me By	Esquire, Jul. 1990	Something to Remember Me By: Three Tales; Collected Stories
By the St. Lawrence	Esquire, Jul. 1995	Collected Stories

=== Collections ===
Title	Year	Publisher	Notes
Mosby's Memoirs and Other Stories	1968	Viking Press	
Him with His Foot in His Mouth and Other Stories	1984	HarperCollins	
Something to Remember Me By: Three Tales	1990	Penguin Books	
Collected Stories	2001	Penguin Books	
Novels 1944-1953	2003	Library of America	Contains Dangling Man, The Victim, The Adventures of Augie March
Novels 1956-1964	2007	Library of America	Contains Seize the Day, Henderson the Rain King, Herzog
Novels 1970-1982	2010	Library of America	Contains Mr. Sammler’s Planet, Humboldt’s Gift, The Dean’s December
Novels 1984-2000	2015	Library of America	Contains More Die of Heartbreak, A Theft, The Bellarosa Connection, The Actual, Ravelstein, What Kind of Day Did You Have?

=== Plays ===
Title	Year	Notes
The Last Analysis	1965	

== Non-fiction ==
Title	Year	Notes
To Jerusalem and Back	1976	Account of Bellow's 1975 visit to Israel
It All Adds Up: From the Dim Past to the Uncertain Future	1994	Collection of essays, lectures, and articles
"Among writers : from a career's correspondence about the nature of the novel". Life and Letters. The New Yorker. Vol. 86, no. 10. April 26, 2010.	2010	
Saul Bellow: Letters	2010	Collection of Bellow's correspondence from 1932 - 2005, edited by Benjamin Taylor
There Is Simply Too Much to Think About: Collected Nonfiction	2015	Collection of essays, also edited by Benjamin Taylor
