= 1976 Nobel Prize in Literature =

Award

- Saul Bellow
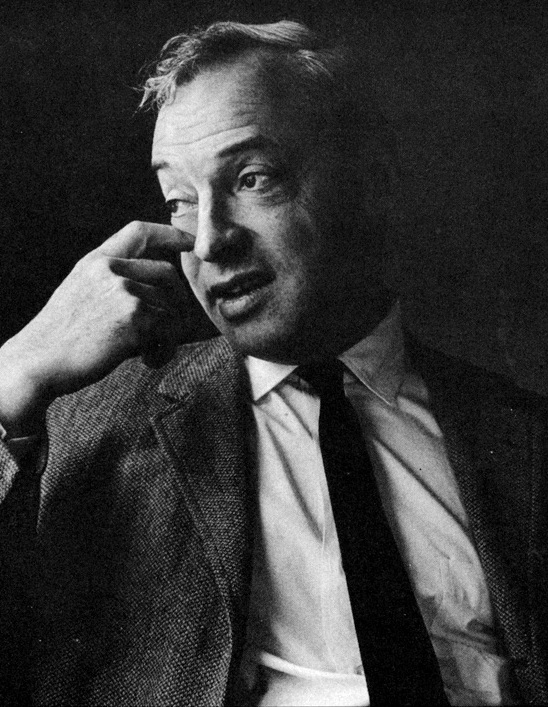
- "for the human understanding and subtle analysis of contemporary culture that are combined in his work"
- Date: 21 October 1976 (announcement); 10 December 1976 (ceremony)
- Location: Stockholm, Sweden
- Presented by: Swedish Academy
- First award: 1901
- Website: Official website

The 1976 Nobel Prize in Literature was awarded to Canadian-American novelist Saul Bellow (1915–2005) "for the human understanding and subtle analysis of contemporary culture that are combined in his work". He is the seventh American recipient of the prize. The previous American recipient was John Steinbeck in 1962.

== Laureate ==
Bellow made his debut with the novel Dangling Man in 1944, but his literary breakthrough came in 1953 with The Adventures of Augie March. Considered one of the innovators of the American novel, he gained wider readership with Herzog (1964), Mr. Sammler's Planet (1970), and Humboldt's Gift (1975). His themes include the disorientation of contemporary society, and the ability of people to overcome their frailty and achieve greatness or awareness. Bellow saw many flaws in modern civilization, and its ability to foster madness, materialism and misleading knowledge. Often his characters are Jewish and have a sense of alienation or otherness. He won a Pulitzer Prize in 1976 and the only writer to win the National Book Award for Fiction three times.

== Deliberations ==
Bellow was first nominated for the prize in 1967. He was shortlisted as one of the final candidates for the 1973, 1974 and 1975 prizes. In 1973, Bellow was competing against the subsequently awarded Australian novelist Patrick White after Nobel committee chairman Karl Ragnar Gierow had recommended Bellow as his first proposal for that year's prize. In 1974 and 1975, the committee again recommended Bellow as a main contender for the prize, in 1974 alternatively for a shared prize with Norman Mailer.

== Reactions ==
=== Personal reactions ===
At a news conference in Chicago, Saul Bellow spoke of his fears and humility at being awarded with the prize. He said, "A primitive part of me, the child in me is delighted. The adult in me is skeptical." He also expressed his hope that the award would not be a burden, as it was for John Steinbeck, who died in 1968. He said, "I knew Steinbeck quite well, and I remember how burdened he was by the Nobel Prize. He felt that he had to give a better account of himself than he had done."

Asked by the press what he would do with the prize money, Bellow said, "I don’t have any plans for the money. At this rate--considering the publicity and attention--my heirs will get the money in a day or two."

=== National reactions ===
Bellow had been a favourite to win the prize in previous years and was a clear favourite in 1976. Before the announcement, a Swedish newspaper predicted that Bellow would be awarded the 1976 literature prize. Malcolm Bradbury of University of East Anglia stated that it would "be hard to fault the choice for 1976, Saul Bellow; difficult to find a contemporary writer who shows the same richness and variety, along with same sharp modernity, of achievement".

== Award ceremony speech ==
At the award ceremony in Stockholm on 10 December 1976, Karl Ragnar Gierow of the Swedish Academy said:

Bellow’s own mixture of rich picaresque novel and subtle analysis of our culture, of entertaining adventure, drastic and tragic episodes in quick succession, interspersed with philosophic conversation with the reader-that too very entertaining-all developed by a commentator with a witty tongue and penetrating insight into the outer and inner complications that drive us to act or prevent us from acting and that can be called the dilemma of our age.

First in the new phase came The Adventures of Augie March (1953). The very wording of the title points straight to the picaresque, and the connexion is perhaps most strongly in evidence in this novel. But here Bellow had found his style, and the tone recurs in the following series of novels that form the bulk of his work: Henderson the Rain King (1959), Herzog (1964), Mr Samler’s Planet (1970) and Humboldt’s Gift (1975). The structure is apparently loose-jointed but for this very reason gives the author ample opportunity for descriptions of different societies; they have a rare vigour and stringency and a swarm of colourful, clearly defined characters against a background of carefully observed and depicted settings, whether it is the magnificent facades of Manhattan in front of the backyards of the slums and semi-slums, Chicago’s impenetrable jungle of resourceful businessmen intimately intertwined with obliging criminal gangs, or the more literal jungle, in the depths of Africa, where the novel, Henderson the Rain King, the writer’s most imaginative expedition, takes place. (...)

His “anti-heroes” are victims of constant disappointment, born to defeat without end, and Bellow (it cannot be over-emphasized) loves and is able to transform the fate they find worthwhile into superb comedies. But they triumph nonetheless, they are heroes nonetheless, since they never give up the realm of values in which man becomes human.
