= Edward Shils =

American sociologist (1910–1995)

- Born: July 1, 1910; Springfield, Massachusetts
- Died: January 23, 1995 (aged 84); Chicago

Education
- Education: University of Pennsylvania

Philosophical work
- Institutions: University of Chicago; University of Leiden
- Main interests: sociology, social philosophy

Edward Albert Shils (1 July 1910 – 23 January 1995) was a Distinguished Service Professor in the Committee on Social Thought and in Sociology at the University of Chicago and an influential sociologist. He was known for his research on the role of intellectuals and their relations to power and public policy. His work was honored in 1983 when he was awarded the Balzan Prize. In 1979, he was selected by the National Council on the Humanities to give the Jefferson Lecture, the highest award given by the U.S. federal government for distinguished intellectual achievement in the humanities.

== Education ==
Shils grew up in Philadelphia, where he went to high school. Though he taught sociology and social thought, he did not have a formal degree in those fields. His undergraduate degree, from the University of Pennsylvania, was in French literature. He came to the attention of Louis Wirth, a distinguished sociologist at the University of Chicago, who hired Shils as a research assistant. Thereafter, Shils became recognized as an outstanding teacher in the field of sociology. His knowledge of the literatures of numerous cultures and fields was deemed to be impressive. He taught sociology, social philosophy, English literature, history of Chinese science and other subjects.

== Career ==
A specialist in the thought of sociologist Max Weber, he translated works by Weber and by sociologist Karl Mannheim into English. He served with the British Army and the United States Office of Strategic Services during World War II. Upon returning to Chicago, he was appointed Associate Professor in 1947, and Professor in 1950. In 1971, he was named Distinguished Service Professor.

For many years, Shils held joint appointments at Chicago and other universities. He was: reader in sociology at the London School of Economics from 1946 to 1950; a fellow of King's College, Cambridge, from 1961 to 1970; a fellow of Peterhouse, Cambridge, from 1970 to 1978; and an honorary professor in social anthropology at the University of London from 1971 to 1977. He was named an honorary fellow at the London School of Economics in 1972 and an honorary fellow at Peterhouse in 1979. He was also a professor at the University of Leiden from 1976 to 1977.

He attempted to bridge the research traditions of German and American sociology. At Chicago, he attracted leading European scholars to teach at the University, including Arnaldo Momigliano, Raymond Aron and the British sinologist Michael Loewe, among others. Professor Shils was a member of the American Academy of Arts and Sciences and the American Philosophical Society.

Edward Shils studied how sacred and ritual elements exist in modern, secular societies. He was influenced by the ideas of Emile Durkheim and Max Weber. Although he worked with Talcott Parsons in the early 1950s, Shils later criticized Parsons’ abstract systems theory and focused more on symbols, values, and emotions. Shils argued that every society has a "sacred center" that represents its main values and collective identity. This center is not geographical but symbolic, often connected to elites, institutions, and cultural traditions. He also developed a broader idea of charisma, suggesting that it can be linked not only to revolutionary leaders but also to established political authority. This “normal charisma” helps to support and legitimize social order. Shils' work is known for combining Weberian and Durkheimian ideas in a unique way.

== Personal life ==
Edward Shils married the historian Irene Coltman in England towards the end of 1951. Edward Shils and Irene Coltman had a son. They divorced. Shils died in January 1995. He was survived by his son and daughter-in-law, Adam and Carrie Shils of Chicago; a grandson, Sam Shils; and a nephew, Edward Benjamin Shils, professor emeritus at the University of Pennsylvania A large photo of Shils hangs in the Shils Reading Room at the University of Chicago's Social Science Research Building.

Shils had a fraught relationship with Saul Bellow, a colleague at the University of Chicago who also served on the Committee on Social Thought. Shils served as his "mentor, character model and editor" and figures prominently in many of Bellow's novels, including Mr. Sammler's Planet (Artur Sammler), Humboldt's Gift (Professor Durnwald), and Ravelstein (Rakhmiel Kogon). Artur Sammler and Professor Durnwald are both described glowingly, but in Ravelstein the Shils character is treated with "animosity [that] reaches lethal proportions" following a falling out between the two. He also had a poor relationship with Alfred Kazin, with Joseph Epstein describing how he refused to have anything written by Kazin in his home and saying "I don’t want that Jew in my house" (although Shils himself was also Jewish).

== Bibliography ==
=== Own works ===
- Shils, Edward A.; Morris Janowitz (1948). "Cohesion and Disintegration in the Wehrmacht in World War II". The Public Opinion Quarterly. 12 (2). The Public Opinion Quarterly, Vol. 12, No. 2 (Summer, 1948), pp. 280-315 Published by Oxford University Press on behalf of the American Association for Public Opinion Research: 280–315. doi:10.1086/265951. JSTOR 2745268.
- Parsons, Talcott & Edward A. Shils, eds. (1951). Toward a general theory of action. Cambridge, Mass.: Harvard UP.
- Shils, Edward A. (1956). The torment of secrecy : the background and consequences of American security policies. Glencoe, Ill.: Free Press.
- The Intellectual Between Tradition and Modernity: The Indian Situation. The Hague: Mouton & Co. 1961 – via Internet Archive.
- Theories of Society: Foundations of Modern Sociological Theory, Two Volumes in One, with Jesse R. Pitts, Talcott Parsons (Editor), & Kaspar D. Naegele, New York: The Free Press (1961)
- The Calling of Sociology, and Other Essays on the Pursuit of Learning (1980)
- Tradition (Chicago: University of Chicago Press, 1981)
- The Constitution of Society. Chicago: University of Chicago Press. 1982.
- The Academic Ethic. Chicago: University of Chicago Press. 1984 – via Internet Archive..
- Shils, Edward (January–February 1996). "Leopold Labedz". Intellectuals. Quadrant. 40 (1–2): 51–60.
- Joseph Epstein, ed. (1997). Portraits: A Gallery of Intellectuals. Chicago: University of Chicago Press – via Internet Archive.

=== Critical studies, reviews and biography ===
- Zubrzycki, Jerzy (January–February 1996). "Edward Shils – a personal memoir". Quadrant. 40 (1–2): 61–63.

=== Translations ===
- Mannheim, Karl (1936). Ideology and Utopia: an Introduction to the Sociology of Knowledge. Translated by Wirth, Louis; Shils, Edward. New York: Harcourt, Brace & World.
- Weber, Max (1954). Max Weber on Law in Economy and Society. Translated by Rheinstein, Max; Shils, Edward. Cambridge MA: Harvard U.P.

== See also ==
- Chicago school (sociology)
