= James Wood (critic) bibliography =

Works by or about James Wood, English critic and writer.

== Books ==
=== Novels ===
- Wood, James (2003). The book against God. New York: Farrar, Straus and Giroux.
- — (2018). Upstate. New York: Farrar, Straus and Giroux.

=== Non-fiction ===
- Wood, James (1999). The broken estate : essays on literature and belief. New York: Random House.
  - Bulgarian edition: Wood, James (2010). Kak dejstva literaturata. Kralica Mab.
- — (2004). The irresponsible self : on laughter and the novel. New York: Farrar, Straus and Giroux.
- — (2008). How fiction works. New York: Farrar, Straus and Giroux.
- — (2012). The fun stuff. New York: Farrar, Straus and Giroux.
- — (2015). The nearest thing to life. Brandeis University Press.
- — (2020). Serious noticing : selected essays, 1997-2019. New York: Farrar, Straus and Giroux.

== Essays, reporting and other contributions ==
- Wood, James (March 15, 2010). "Keeping it real". The Critics. A Critic at Large. The New Yorker. 86 (4): 71–75.
- — (August 15–22, 2011). "Is that all there is? Secularism and its discontents". The Critics. A Critic at Large. The New Yorker. 87 (24): 86–92.
- — (November 7, 2011). "Shelf life". Personal History. The New Yorker. 87 (35): 40–43.
- — (December 19–26, 2011). "Reality effects". The Critics. Books. The New Yorker. 87 (41): 134–138.
- — (March 11, 2013). "Broken vows : Jamie Quatro's stories". The Critics. Books. The New Yorker. 89 (4): 72–74.
- — (April 8, 2013). "Youth in revolt : Rachel Kushner's The flamethrowers". The Critics. Books. The New Yorker. 89 (8): 78–82.
- — (July 22, 2013). "Sins of the father". The Critics. A Critic at Large. The New Yorker. 89 (21): 70–74.
- — (August 5, 2013). "All my sons : a novel of privilege, patrimony, and the literary life". The Critics. Books. The New Yorker. 89 (23): 73–75.
- — (October 21, 2013). "The new curiosity shop : Donna Tartt's 'The goldfinch'". The Critics. Books. The New Yorker. 89 (33): 100–102.
- — (February 10, 2014). "But he confessed : Jesse Ball's 'Silence once begun'". The Critics. Books. The New Yorker. 89 (48): 77–79.
- — (March 31, 2014). "Mother courage : Jenny Offill's 'Dept. of Speculation'". The Critics. Books. The New Yorker. 90 (6): 74–77.
- — (August 25, 2014). "Away thinking about things : James Kelman's fighting words". The Critics. Books. The New Yorker. 90 (24): 64–69.
- — (October 20, 2014). "No time for lies : rediscovering Elizabeth Harrower". The Critics. Books. The New Yorker. 90 (32): 90–94.
- — (March 23, 2015). "The uses of oblivion : Kazuo Ishiguro's 'The Buried Giant'". The Critics. Books. The New Yorker. 91 (5): 92–94.
- — (May 4, 2015). "Circling the subject : Amit Chaudhuri's novel Odysseus Abroad". The Critics. Books. The New Yorker. 91 (11): 73–75.
- — (May 25, 2015). "All her children : family agonies in Anne Enright's 'The Green Road'". The Critics. Books. The New Yorker. 91 (14): 71–73.
- — (March 21, 2016). "Floating island : Haitian happenings in Mischa Berlinski's Peacekeeping". The Critics. Books. The New Yorker. 92 (6): 96–98.
- — (April 25, 2016). "Stranger in our midst : a war criminal rusticates in Edna O'Brien's 'The Little Red Chairs'". The Critics. Books. The New Yorker. 92 (11): 96–98.
- — (October 10, 2016). "Male gaze : David Szalay's 'All that man is'". The Critics. Books. The New Yorker. 92 (32): 98–101.
- — (May 20, 2019). "The time of your life : can secularists bring religious intensity to redeeming our actual existence?". The Critics. Books. The New Yorker. 95 (13): 90–95.
- — (June 1, 2020). "In from the cold : a Hungarian essayist struggles against Enlightenment". The Critics. Books. The New Yorker. 96 (15): 64–67.
- — (October 4, 2021). "Connect the dots : everything must converge in Anthony Doerr's 'Cloud cuckoo land'". The Critics. Books. The New Yorker. 97 (31): 69–72.
- — (February 13–20, 2023). "Desperately normal : daughters outgrow their parents in Gwendoline Riley's unsparing novels". The New Yorker. 99 (1): 87–89.

Introductions, forewords etc.

- Selected Stories of D. H. Lawrence (Modern Library, 1999)
- Collected Stories of Saul Bellow (Penguin, 2002)
- The Golovlyov Family by Mikhail Evgrafovich Saltykov (New York Review Books, 2001)
- The Heart of the Matter by Graham Greene (Penguin, 2004)
- Tess of the d'Urbervilles by Thomas Hardy (Modern Library, 2001)
- The Woodlanders by Thomas Hardy (Modern Library, 2002)
- The Myth of Sisyphus by Albert Camus (Penguin Modern Classics, 2000)
- La Nausée by Jean-Paul Sartre (Penguin Modern Classics, 2000)
- Novels 1944-1953: Dangling Man, The Victim, The Adventures of Augie March by Saul Bellow (Library of America, 2003)
- Austerlitz by W.G. Sebald (Penguin, 2011)
- The Book of Common Prayer (Penguin, 2012)
- Caught by Henry Green (New York Review Books, 2016)
- A Difficult Death: The Life and Work of Jens Peter Jacobsen by Morten Høi Jensen (Yale University Press, 2017)

== Critical studies and reviews of Wood's work ==
How fiction works

- Peter Conrad in The Observer
- John Banville in The New York Review of Books
