= Henderson the Rain King =

1959 novel by Saul Bellow

- First edition cover
- Author: Saul Bellow
- Cover artist: Bill Preston
- Language: English
- Publisher: Viking Press
- Publication date: February 23, 1959
- Publication place: United States
- Media type: Print
- Pages: 341
- OCLC: 279586
- Preceded by: Seize the Day
- Followed by: Herzog

Henderson the Rain King is a 1959 novel by Saul Bellow. The book's blend of philosophical discourse and comic adventure has helped make it one of his more popular works.

The novel is said to be Bellow's favorite among his books. It was ranked number 21 on Modern Library's list of the 100 Best Novels in the English language.

== Plot ==
Eugene Henderson is a troubled middle-aged man. Despite his riches, high social status, and physical prowess, he feels restless and unfulfilled, and harbors a spiritual void that manifests itself as an inner voice crying out "I want, I want, I want." Hoping to discover what the voice wants, Henderson goes to Africa.

Upon reaching Africa, Henderson splits with his original group and hires a native guide, Romilayu. Romilayu leads Henderson to the village of the Arnewi, where Henderson befriends the leaders of the village. He learns that the cistern from which the Arnewi get their drinking water is plagued by frogs, thus rendering the water "unclean" according to local taboos. Henderson attempts to save the Arnewi by ridding them of the frogs, but his enthusiastic scheme ends in disaster, destroying the frogs and the village's cistern.

Henderson and Romilayu travel to the village of the Wariri. Here, Henderson impulsively performs a feat of strength by moving the giant wooden statue of the goddess Mummah and unwittingly becomes the Wariri Rain King, Sungo. He quickly develops a friendship with the native-born but western-educated King Dahfu, with whom he engages in a series of far-reaching philosophical discussions.

The King finds solace and intellectual stimulation in his discussions with Henderson and confides in him that he is housing a trained lioness, Atti, in the royal complex. Dahfu has developed a strong bond with the animal which is frowned upon by the local elders as sorcery. They feel the King should be spending more time searching and capturing another lion, which is the supposed reincarnation of the late King, Dahfu's father. This event would legitimize Dahfu's position as true king of the Wariri. Dahfu's insistence on visiting this errant tamed lioness has angered traditionalists to the point where they are conspiring against him. When Henderson is introduced to the lioness he is petrified with fear - a therapeutic release mechanism with the King guiding him through personal demons. These therapy sessions creates a tighter bond between the two men, which also makes the villagers suspicious.

When the former king's lion is located, Dahfu invites Henderson on the capture mission. The lion hunt fails miserably, and the lion mortally wounds the King when the cage mechanism collapses. Henderson learns shortly before Dahfu's death that the Rain King is the next person in the line of succession for the throne since Dahfu had no of-age children for succession rights. Henderson suspects that the elders set up Dahfu for failure and sabotage as the captured lion was not Dahfu's father's lion. Having no interest in being king and suffering a similar fate, Henderson and Romilayu escape from the royal hut and wish only to return home to his wife and children. Henderson flees the Wariri village, scooping up Dahfu's lion cub (his supposed reincarnation) and taking it away to America. Through a series of cities and airports from Sub-Saharian Africa to Europe Henderson makes his way home with the lion cub in tow with renewed interest in life and fatherhood.

Although it is unclear whether Henderson has truly found spiritual contentment, the novel ends with an optimistic and uplifting note.

== Discussion ==
Henderson learns that a man can, with effort, have a spiritual rebirth when he realizes that spirit, body and the outside world are not enemies but can live in harmony. Henderson and Dahfu both struggle with the provincial qualities of their native homes but are able to find intellectual stimulation by leaving their countries-Henderson a white wealthy American and Dahfu, a royal tribesman who enjoys western literature, science and philosophy. A testimony that cultures can and will learn from each other, no matter how different.

A week before the novel appeared in book stores, Bellow published an article in The New York Times titled "The Search for Symbols, a Writer Warns, Misses All the Fun and Fact of the Story." Here, Bellow warns readers against looking too deeply for symbols in literature. This has led to much discussion among critics as to why Bellow warned his readers against searching for symbolism just before the symbol-packed Rain King hit the shelves.

The ongoing philosophical discussions and ramblings between Henderson and the natives, and inside Henderson's own head, prefigure elements of Bellow's next novel Herzog (1964), which includes many such inquiries into life and meaning.

As in all Bellow's novels, death figures prominently in Henderson the Rain King. Also, the novel manifests a few common character types that run through Bellow's literary works. One type is the Bellovian Hero, often described as a schlemiel. Eugene Henderson, in company with most of Bellow's main characters, can be given this description, in the opinion of some people. Another is what Bellow calls the "Reality-Instructor"; in Henderson the Rain King, King Dahfu fills this role. In Seize the Day, the instructor is played by Dr. Tamkin, while in Humboldt's Gift, Humboldt von Fleisher takes the part.

Scholars such as Bellow biographer James Atlas and others have shown that quite a few passages and ideas were lifted from a book titled The Cattle Complex in East Africa (1926) written by Bellow's anthropology professor Melville Herskovits who supervised his senior thesis at Northwestern University in 1937.

== Pulitzer Prize ==
In 1960, the Pulitzer Prize committee for fiction recommended Henderson the Rain King be awarded the prize for that year. The Pulitzer board, which have final say over the awarding of the prize, overrode their recommendation and chose Advise and Consent by Allen Drury.

== Other media ==
- Leon Kirchner adapted Henderson the Rain King into the libretto for his opera Lily, which premiered at the New York City Opera in the spring of 1977. It was not a success, and was Kirchner's only foray into opera.
- "Rain King" is a song by Terence Boylan from his 1977 album Terence Boylan. It is clearly based on Bellow's novel.
- "Rain King" is a song by Counting Crows from their 1993 album August and Everything After. Henderson the Rain King and its characters were an inspiration in the song's writing.
- One passage in the novel inspired Joni Mitchell to write the song "Both Sides, Now" in 1967.
- Henderson the Rain King was mentioned as the favorite book of the character Ally McBeal in season 1, episode 3 of Ally McBeal, titled "The Kiss".
