= The Actual =

The Actual may refer to:

- The Actual (band), an American pop rock group
- The Actual (novel), a novel by Saul Bellow
- "The Actual" (song), a song by All City
