= Werner J. Dannhauser =

American academic (1929–2014)

Werner Joseph Dannhauser (May 1, 1929 – April 26, 2014) was an American political philosophy professor and magazine editor. A German-Jewish émigré, he became an expert on the philosophy of Friedrich Nietzsche and on Judaism and politics and was a longtime professor of government at Cornell University. A protégé of Leo Strauss at the University of Chicago, Dannhauser had earlier been a writer and editor at Commentary magazine during the 1960s.

== Early years ==
Dannhauser was born on May 1, 1929, in Buchau in southwestern Germany.

In early 1939, at the age of nine, Dannhauser came to the United States in order to escape Nazi Germany. An older brother Jacob (1922–1998) and an older sister Rose (1924–2018) also came with him. He became an American citizen in 1944. He completed the rest of his childhood in Cleveland, Ohio, where he was active in the congregation known as The Temple.

Dannhauser earned a bachelor's degree from The New School for Social Research in 1951.

== Graduate student and instructor ==
In the mid-1950s, Dannhauser came to the University of Chicago as a graduate student in the Committee on Social Thought. There he studied for his Ph.D. under Leo Strauss, whom he had first heard speak at the New School in New York City. Dannhauser soon became a disciple of Strauss's; when later characterized as a Straussian, he said "I wear the label with pride".

During the 1955–56 year, he was awarded a Fulbright Grant for study in Germany. His efforts as a student in that country included time spent at the University of Berlin and at Heidelberg University.

In the early 1960s, Dannhauser held the position of lecturer in the liberal arts at the University of Chicago. During several summers, he taught classes on poetry and drama at The Clearing Folk School in Door County, Wisconsin. He was also an instructor at the University of Maryland at some point. For 1963–64 he received an appointment as an instructor in government at Claremont Men's College.

By 1963, Dannhauser's doctoral thesis, entitled The Political Philosophy of Nietzsche, was described as having been accepted for publication. The political theorist Hannah Arendt, who had an affiliation with the Committee on Social Thought, had an awareness of Dannhauser's work on his dissertation, and objected to his "tone-deafness" and what she saw as one-dimensional interpretations that ignored elements of irony and ambiguity in Nietzsche's work. In any case, Dannhauser would not finally get his Ph.D. degree until eight years later.

Early on, Dannhauser established a reputation as a rake, with particular predilictions for gambling and womanizing. (By one tale, Strauss once loaned him money to pay off a poker debt that was threatening to result in physical harm.)

== Commentary magazine ==
Leaving academia, Dannhouser started working as one of the staff members at Commentary in November 1964. His strong Jewish identity and knowledge of European intellectual history appealed to editor-in-chief Norman Podhoretz. In March 1966, Dannhauser was named an assistant editor, and subsequently had the title of associate editor.

Political arguments between Dannhauser and fellow editor Ted Solotaroff, especially over the Vietnam War – a U.S. military involvement that Dannhauser strongly favored – led to Solotaroff leaving the magazine, which in turn contributed to the magazine's change in ideological position. In another case, Dannhauser threatened to resign from the magazine unless a piece supporting aggressive U.S. intervention in the war was published. In common with many American Jews, Dannhauser celebrated Israel's victories in the Six-Day War of June 1967.

Dannhauser left Commentary in the summer of 1968. He had played a significant role in shifting the magazine to a more conservative viewpoint, especially regarding Vietnam policy and objections to the excesses of the New Left.

== Marriage and family ==
Dannhauser married Shoshana Zaltzman in 1967. She was an Israeli who studied Semitic languages. She worked as an instructor at the University of Wisconsin–Madison, where she also assisted in scholarly translation work; she subsequently was an instructor at Cornell.

Together the couple had two daughters. She died in April 1973 at age 35, of cancer. Dannhauser raised the daughters as a single parent.

== Professor ==
Dannhauser was hired as an assistant professor and became part of the department of government at Cornell University as of Fall 1968 (this was despite his not yet having his Ph.D.) There he joined Allan Bloom and Walter Berns, two other former students of Strauss, making the department known as a bastion of political philosophy teaching. The following year, the campus and the faculty were shaken by the takeover of the Cornell student union by members of the Afro-American Society in 1969; unhappy with what they saw as the university administration's weak response, Bloom and Berns left Cornell, but Dannhauser stayed.

He finally received his Ph.D. degree from the University of Chicago in 1971. In February 1973, Dannhauser was promoted to associate professor at Cornell.

Dannhauser did not publish much as an academic, in part due to bouts with writer's block. His most prominent work was the book Nietzsche's View of Socrates, published in 1974. In the 1976 volume On Jews and Judaism in Crisis: Selected Essays, he edited, and in many cases translated from German, a volume of essays by the scholar of Jewish mysticism Gershom Scholem. Arthur A. Cohen, reviewing for The New York Times Book Review, said that Dannhauser had "edited with grace and ingenuity".

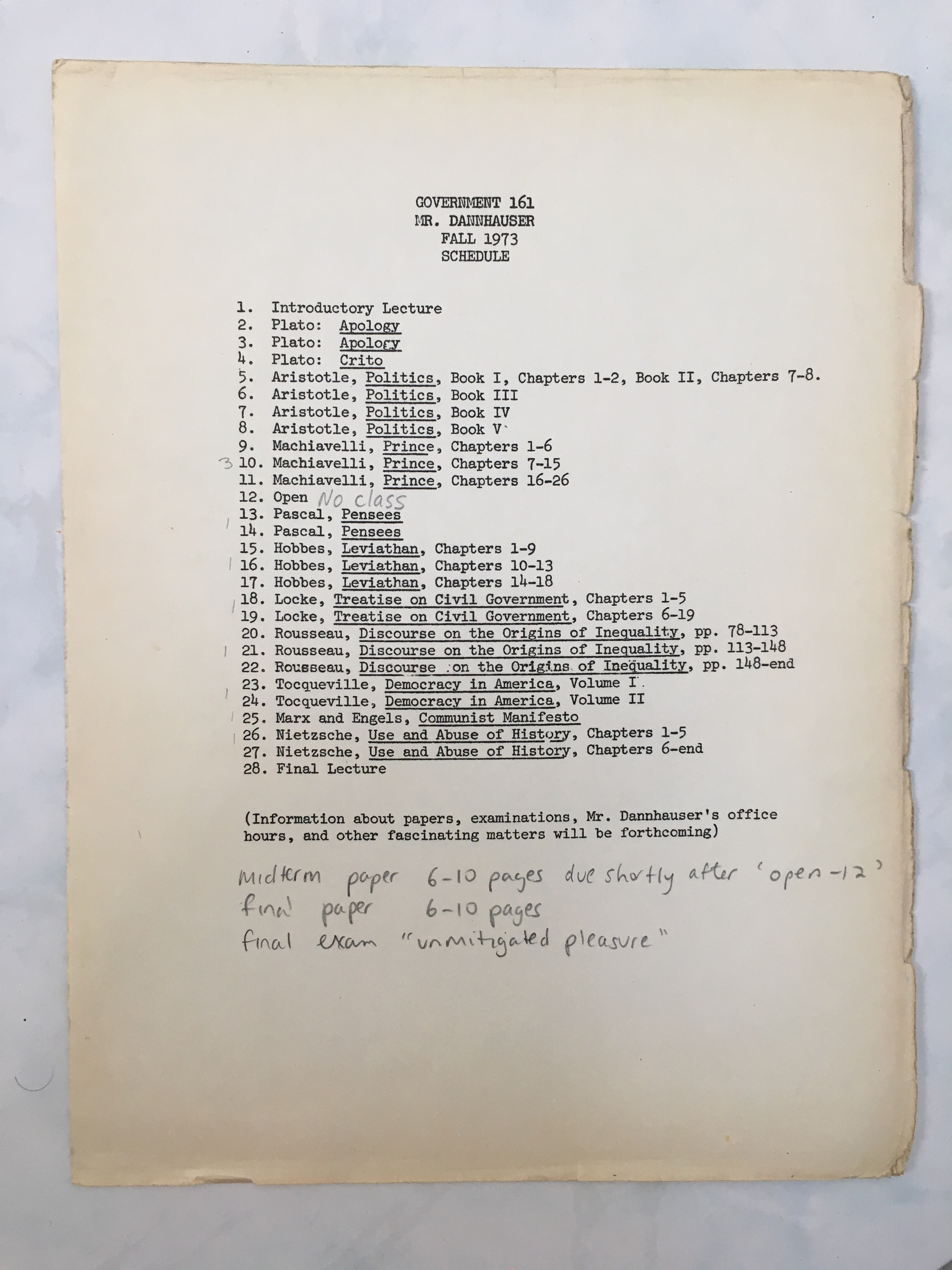
Reading list for Dannhauser's Introduction to Political Theory course, Fall 1973

Instead, Dannhauser was mainly known as a teacher. He focused on a "great books" approach to political philosophy. He was given the Clark Award in 1971, Cornell's highest recognition for teaching undergraduates.

Dannhauser's 1975 essay, "On Teaching Politics Today", published in Commentary, gained considerable notice, in part due to the associations he drew between lecturing and eros that perhaps went beyond the bounds of political correctness. In 1978, he provoked a controversy on campus still remembered by some people many years later. Speaking at a lecture that was sponsored by the Women's Studies Program, he criticized such programs for precluding a discussion of whether women were inferior to men. While demurring that he did not know if they were inferior, equal, or superior overall, he said that in that his field of philosophy, "the highest way of life ... women have performed absolutely badly in that field ... that is a difference that ultimately has to be understood in terms of inferiority or superiority." This stance brought about negative-to-outraged reactions from professors and students in letters to The Cornell Daily Sun over the next several days, including ones which mentioned eminent women philosophers, and subsequent negative-to-sarcastically insulting rejoinders by Dannhauser.

He was a Fellow of the National Endowment for the Humanities during the 1974–75 year. During 1981–83, he was a Visiting Fellow at the National Humanities Center.

In 1992, Dannhauser retired from Cornell, at which point he became a professor emeritus there.

For the next number of years, he taught as an adjunct professor at Michigan State University, where one of his former students was a faculty member. He was still affiliated there in 2002, but subsequently retired from teaching altogether.

== Final years ==
Dannhauser was the basis of the character Morris Herbst in Saul Bellow's roman à clef published in 2000, Ravelstein, the primary subject of which was Dannhauser's former colleague, and Bellow's friend, Allan Bloom. Dannhauser did not mind being portrayed as a womanizer by Bellow, but did not like that Bellow had revealed details of Bloom's private life in the novel. Bellow had actually sent Dannhauser an advance copy of the manuscript, and had removed or recast a few descriptions based Dannhauser's objections. Nevertheless, Dannhauser still felt that Bellow had gone too far: "I don't believe everything is justified for art."

In 2008, a Festschrift entitled Reason, Faith, and Politics: Essays in Honor of Werner J. Dannhauser was published by Lexington Books. It was edited by Arthur M. Melzer and Robert P. Kraynak, both former students of Dannhauser's who went onto academic careers of their own. The volume's contributors included Francis Fukuyama, who took pains to disassociate Straussians from the "neoconservative" label.

Dannhauser died at age 84 on April 26, 2014, in Frederick, Pennsylvania. Services for him were held in Cleveland Heights, Ohio. He is buried at Zion Memorial Park Cemetery in Bedford Heights, Ohio.

John Podhoretz, son of Norman, wrote upon the passing that Dannhauser "was an American original—and of a type of which there are, sadly, fewer and fewer as the years pass. He was a deeply serious intellectual—and a bit of a reprobate."

== Published books ==
- Nietzsche's View of Socrates, Cornell University Press, 1974 (second printing, 1976; republished 2019; translated to Chinese as 尼采眼中的苏格拉底, 2013).
- On Jews and Judaism in Crisis: Selected Essays, Gershom Scholem [editor and translator], Schocken Books, 1976 (republished Paul Dry Books, 2012).
