= The Dean's December =

1982 novel by Saul Bellow

- First edition cover
- Author: Saul Bellow
- Language: English
- Publisher: Harper & Row
- Publication date: 1982
- Publication place: New York City, New York, United States
- Media type: Print (hardback & paperback)
- Pages: 346
- ISBN: 978-0-06-014849-2
- Preceded by: Humboldt's Gift
- Followed by: More Die of Heartbreak

The Dean's December is a 1982 novel by the American author Saul Bellow. It is his ninth novel, and the first novel Bellow published after winning the Nobel Prize in Literature in 1976.

== Synopsis ==
Set in Chicago and Bucharest, the book's main character, Albert Corde, a meditative academic who faces a crisis, accompanies his Romanian-born astrophysicist wife to her Communist-ruled native country, where they deal with the death of his mother-in-law. This sojourn allows Corde to observe the workings of a totalitarian regime in particular and the Eastern Bloc in general, a perspective which provides him with insight into the human condition.

== Reception ==
In The New York Times Book Review, critic Robert Towers concluded, "The Dean's December confirms me in the opinion I have held since, nearly 30 years ago, I read The Adventures of Augie March (having, as an impecunious instructor, paid out hard cash for my hardcover copy just off the press): Sentence by sentence, page by page, Saul Bellow is simply the best writer that we have."

Writing in The Boston Phoenix, Mark Shechner felt just the opposite. "Let me say plainly that The Dean's December is a bad piece of work, a dull book and a false one. ... The book is entirely lacking in steam. ... [It] sinks beneath the weight of its own factitiousness."
