= Billy Rose =

American impresario, theatrical showman and lyricist (1899–1966)

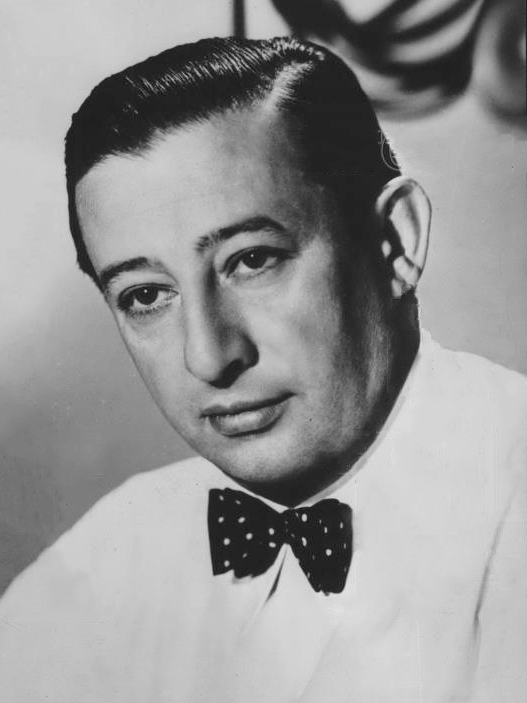
- Rose in 1948
- Born: William Samuel Rosenberg; September 6, 1899; New York City, U.S.
- Died: February 10, 1966 (aged 66); Montego Bay, Jamaica
- Other name: Billy Rosenberg
- Occupations: Impresario, theatrical showman, lyricist and columnist
- Spouses: Fanny Brice (m. 1929; div. 1938) Eleanor Holm (m. 1939; div. 1954) Joyce Mathews (m. 1956; div. 1959) (m. 1961; div. 1963) Doris Warner Vidor (m. 1964)

Billy Rose (born William Samuel Rosenberg; September 6, 1899 – February 10, 1966) was an American impresario, theatrical showman, lyricist and columnist. For years both before and after World War II, Billy Rose was a major force in entertainment, with shows such as Billy Rose's Crazy Quilt (1931), Jumbo (1935), Billy Rose's Aquacade (1937), and Carmen Jones (1943). As a lyricist, he is credited with many songs, notably "Don't Bring Lulu" (1925), "Tonight You Belong to Me" (1926), "Me and My Shadow" (1927), "More Than You Know" (1929), "Without a Song" (1929), "It Happened in Monterrey" (1930), and "It's Only a Paper Moon" (1933).

Rose is also known as the husband of comedian and singer Fanny Brice.

== Life and work ==
Rose was born to a Jewish family in New York City. He attended Public School 44, where he was the 50-yard dash champion. While in high school, Billy studied shorthand under John Robert Gregg, the inventor of the Gregg System for shorthand notation. He won a dictation contest using Gregg notation, taking over 150 words per minute, and writing forward or backward with either hand.

Billy Rose began his career as a stenographic clerk to Bernard Baruch of the War Industries Board during World War I, and became head of the clerical staff. Later he became a lyricist. In this role, he is best known as the credited writer or co-writer of the lyrics to "Me and My Shadow," "Great Day" (with Edward Eliscu), "Does the Spearmint Lose Its Flavor on the Bedpost Overnight" (with Marty Bloom), "I Found a Million Dollar Baby" (with Mort Dixon) and "It's Only a Paper Moon" (with E. Y. Harburg).

Most of Rose's lyrical credits were collaborations. Biographer Earl Conrad said, "Nobody clearly knew what he wrote or didn't write.... Publishers tend to credit him with writing the songs known to bear his name as a lyricist.... But tales rumble on ... that Billy could feed and toss in a remark and monkey around, but that others did most of the writing." Lyricists might have been willing to tolerate a Rose credit grab because Rose was very successful at promoting "his" songs.

He went on to become a Broadway producer, and a theatre/nightclub owner. In June 1934, he opened Billy Rose's Music Hall at 52nd Street and Broadway in New York City with the first Benny Goodman Orchestra. He produced Jumbo, starring Jimmy Durante, at the New York Hippodrome Theatre. For the Fort Worth Frontier Centennial (1936–37), he constructed the huge elaborate dinner theatre Casa Mañana which featured celebrated fan-dancer Sally Rand and the world's largest revolving stage. He produced the Aquacade at the Great Lakes Exposition in Cleveland, Ohio in 1937.

Rose was diminutive in stature. When he attended a show, his practice was to book four seats: one for himself, one for his date, and the two in front of those so he would have an unobstructed view.

In 1929, he married Fanny Brice, who went on to star in the 1931 Broadway production of Billy Rose's Crazy Quilt. The marriage ended in divorce in 1938.

In 1938, he opened Billy Rose's Diamond Horseshoe, a nightclub in New York City's Times Square in the basement of the Paramount Hotel. It initially opened with a version of his Fort Worth show. The Diamond Horseshoe operated under that name until 1951.

At the 1939 New York World's Fair, Billy Rose's Aquacade starred Olympian Eleanor Holm in what the fair program called "a brilliant girl show of spectacular size and content." Future MGM star Esther Williams and Tarzan star Johnny Weissmuller were both Aquacade headliners. Rose began an affair with the then-married Holm, who left her husband for Rose. The couple married in 1939.

Following the 1939 World's Fair, Rose asked John Murray Anderson, who had staged the Aquacade, to recommend a choreographer for a new show at the Horseshoe. Anderson recommended Gene Kelly, then performing in William Saroyan's One for the Money. Rose objected that he wanted someone who could choreograph "tits and asses," not "soft-soap from a crazy Armenian" (Yudkoff, 2001). However, after seeing Kelly's performance, he gave Kelly the job, an important step in Kelly's career.

In 1943, he produced Carmen Jones with an all-black cast. An adaptation of Georges Bizet's opera Carmen, the story was transplanted to World War II America by lyricist and librettist Oscar Hammerstein II. It was an instant hit. The New York Telegraph called it "far and away the best show in New York"; The New York Times said it was "beautifully done ... just call it wonderful." The New York Herald Tribune said that Oscar Hammerstein II "must be considered one of the greatest librettists of our day" and that Carmen Jones was "a masterly tour de force." It was made into a motion picture in 1954, for which Dorothy Dandridge received an Oscar nomination.

In 1946, Rose's memoir, Wine, Women and Words, dedicated to Rose's early patron Bernard M. Baruch, was published in New York by Simon & Schuster. The book was illustrated, including the cover of the numbered and signed first edition of 1,500 copies, by Salvador Dalí whom Rose met while producing events at the 1939 World's Fair.

Following the publication of Wine, Women and Words Rose appeared on the cover of Time magazine on June 2, 1947.

In 1946, he began publishing a series of ads for the Diamond Horseshoe in the New York Daily News. This led to a syndicated column, Pitching Horseshoes, that Rose produced until December, 1950. At its height, it reached 2,000 newspapers.

Rose and Holm divorced in 1954. On July 2, 1956, he married showgirl Joyce Mathews (1919–1999), and they divorced July 23, 1959. They then remarried on December 29, 1961, only to divorce again on February 10, 1964, exactly two years before he died. Later in 1964, Rose married Doris Ruth Vidor (née Warner; 1912–1978), who was the widow of film director Charles Vidor.

Rose founded the Billy Rose Sculpture Garden at the Israel Museum in Jerusalem, Israel. His legendary pragmatism is illustrated by a seeming minor event at the sculpture garden opening ceremony, which Rose attended personally. When asked by one of the many distinguished guests what, in the event of war, Rose would have Israel do with these artworks, many of which were modern, steel abstracts, Rose unsmilingly replied, "Melt them down for bullets."

From 1949 until 1955, Rose was the owner-operator of the Ziegfeld Theatre. During that time, the theater housed four musicals and five plays. In 1965, he sold the theater to be demolished to make way for a new skyscraper, the Fisher Brothers' Burlington House.

Rose was a board member of American Society of Composers, Authors and Publishers (ASCAP). ASCAP often slandered rock-and-roll songs. Because rock-and-roll performers increasingly wrote the music and lyrics themselves, professional songwriters lost their dominance in the music industry. As an ASCAP member, Billy Rose labeled rock-and-roll songs "junk" and was quoted as saying, "in many cases they are obscene junk much on the level with dirty comic magazines."

== Later years and death ==
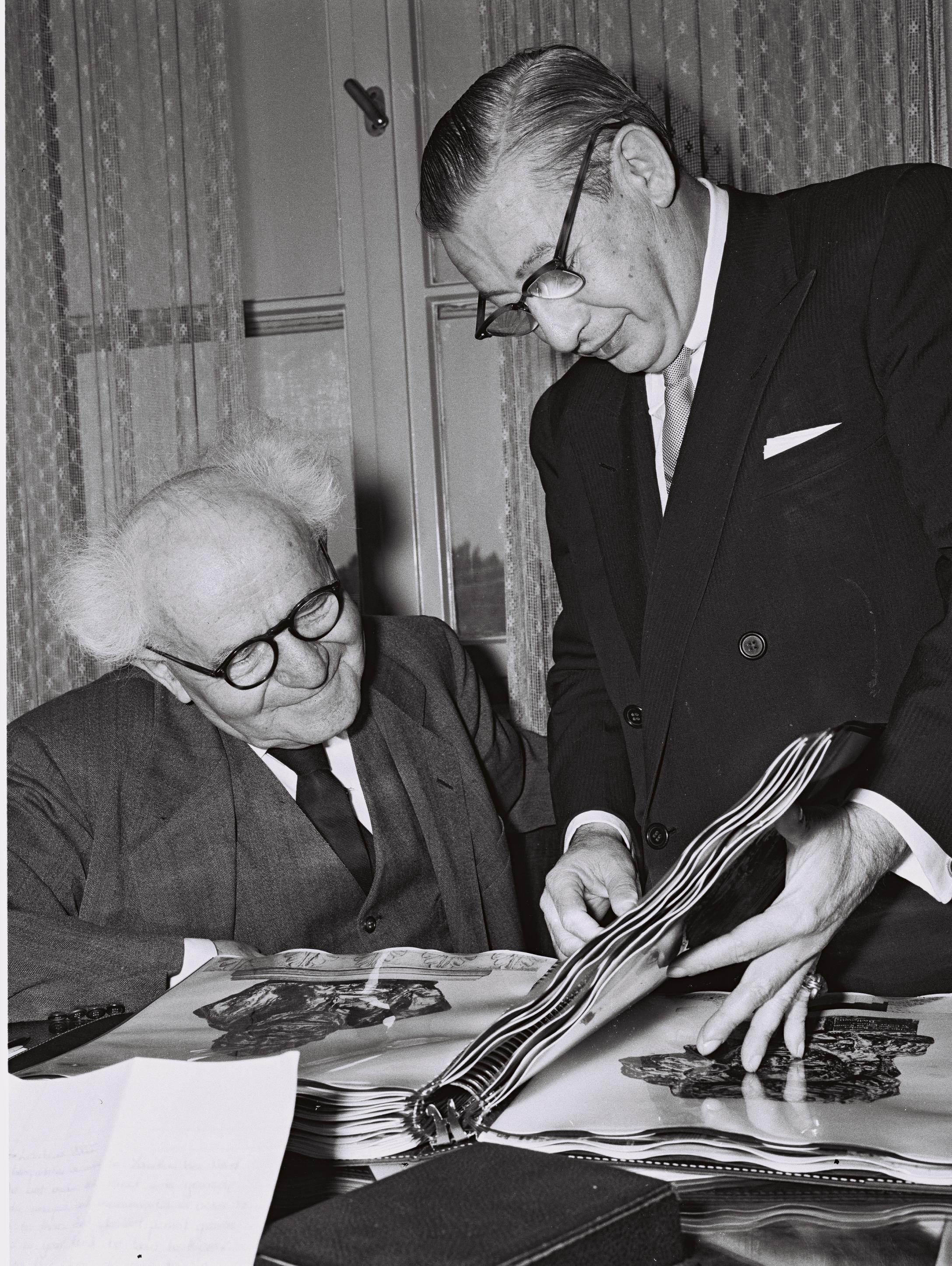
Billy Rose (standing) visiting David Ben-Gurion in 1960

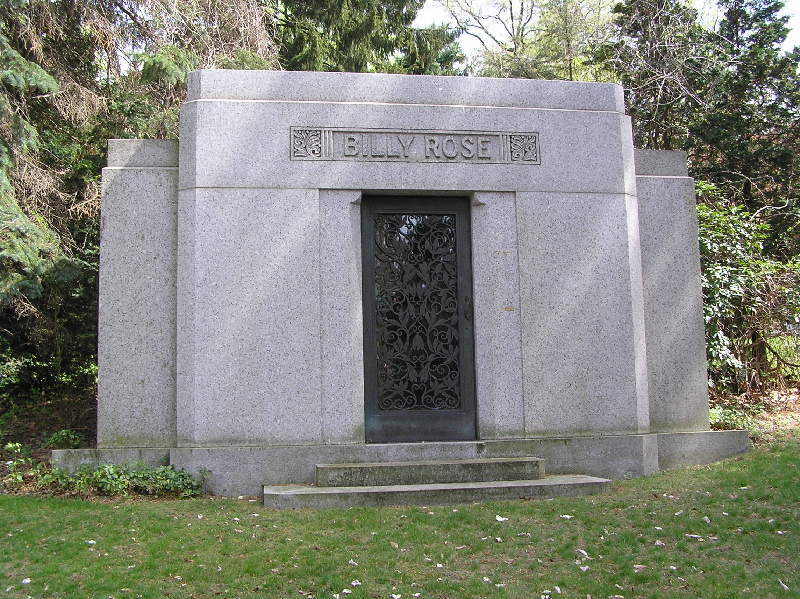
Billy Rose's mausoleum in Westchester Hills Cemetery

From 1959 until his death in 1966, he was also the owner–operator of the Billy Rose Theater. During that time the theater housed four plays, one musical, one revue, three ballets, and twenty-nine concert performances. After his death, the theater retained its name, and remained in the ownership of his estate until 1978, when it was renamed. Today, it is the Nederlander Theatre.

In 1965, Rose was offered, but declined, the role to oversee the 1964 New York World's Fair towards its conclusion.

Rose was a wealthy man when he died of lobar pneumonia at his vacation home in Montego Bay, Jamaica, at the age of 66. At the time of his death, his fortune was estimated at $42 million ($394 million in 2025 dollars), which he left entirely to the Billy Rose Foundation (for the support of fine and performing arts), disowning both of his sisters. He is interred at Westchester Hills Cemetery in Hastings-on-Hudson, New York.

In 1970, Rose was inducted into the Songwriters Hall of Fame.

== Depictions ==
Rose was a leading character in the 1975 musical film Funny Lady, a sequel to Funny Girl, which continues the story of Fanny Brice, again played by Barbra Streisand. Despite physical dissimilarities, actor James Caan was cast as Rose.

The 1962 film Billy Rose's Jumbo, starring Doris Day, depicted the original Broadway show staged by Rose. Although he was not involved in the making of the film, a contractual stipulation made it mandatory that his name appear in the title.

Saul Bellow's novella The Bellarosa Connection depicts Rose as a benevolent figure helping Jews escape the Nazis in Europe.

== Work on Broadway ==
- Charlot Revue (1925) – revue – featured co-lyricist for "A Cup of Coffee, a Sandwich and You" with Al Dubin, music by Joseph Meyer
- Padlocks of 1927 (1927) – revue – lyricist
- Harry Delmar's Revels (1927) – revue – co-lyricist
- Sweet and Low (1930) – revue – composer, lyricist, and producer
- Billy Rose's Crazy Quilt (1931) – revue – producer, librettist, and director
- The Great Magoo (1932) – play – producer
- Ziegfeld Follies of 1934 (1934) – revue – featured lyricist for "Soul Saving Sadie", "Suddenly", "Countess Dubinsky", and "Sarah, the Sunshine Girl"
- Jumbo (1935) – musical – producer
- Clash by Night (1941) – play – producer
- Carmen Jones (1943) – musical – producer
- Seven Lively Arts (1944) – revue – producer
- Concert Varieties (1945) – vaudeville – producer
- Interplay (1945) – ballet – producer
- The Immoralist (1954) – play – producer
- The Wall (1960) – play – co-producer

Posthumous credits

- Ain't Misbehavin' (1978) – revue – featured lyricist for "I've Got a Feeling I'm Falling" from film Applause (1929)
- Big Deal (1986) – musical – featured lyricist for "Me and My Shadow"
- Fosse (1999) – revue – featured lyricist for "Dancin' Dan (Me and My Shadow)"

== See also ==
- List of members of the International Swimming Hall of Fame
- The Bellarosa Connection
