= Adam Bellow =

American editor

Adam A. Bellow is an American editor who is executive editor at Bombardier Books, a politically conservative imprint at Post Hill Press. He previously founded and led the conservative imprints All Points Books at St Martin's Press and Broadside Books at HarperCollins, served as executive editor-at-large at Doubleday, and as editorial director at Free Press, publishing several controversial conservative books such as Illiberal Education, The Real Anita Hill, The Bell Curve, and Clinton Cash.

He is the publisher of The New Pamphleteer, co-editor of The State of the American Mind, and the author of In Praise of Nepotism.

Bellow is the son of novelist Saul Bellow.

== Works ==
- "My Escape From The Zabar's Left". New York, May 21, 2005
