= The Bellarosa Connection =

1989 novella by Saul Bellow

- First edition cover
- Author: Saul Bellow
- Language: English
- Publisher: Penguin Books
- Publication date: 1989
- Publication place: United States
- Media type: Print (Hardback & Paperback)

The Bellarosa Connection is a 1989 novella by the American author Saul Bellow. The book takes the form of an ongoing dialogue between the Fonstein family about the impact of the Holocaust. This is an especially significant story as it represents, along with Mr. Sammler's Planet, Bellow's most significant commentary on the Holocaust.

== Synopsis ==
In the book, the Bellarosa Connection signifies Billy Rose's Madison Square Garden benefit for the Jews of Europe on the most immediate level, but, more deeply, becomes a point of departure for Bellow to consider the American Jewish response to European Jews' experience during World War II.

As Bellow's protagonist comes to grips with the past, his experience distances American Jewry's position from that of its European counterparts. The book moves then to Israel in order to present the three major homelands of the World's Jewry.
