= A Theft =

1989 novel by Saul Bellow

- First edition
- Author: Saul Bellow
- Language: English
- Publisher: Penguin
- Publication date: March 1989
- Publication place: United States
- Media type: Print Paperback
- Pages: 128 pp
- ISBN: 0-14-011969-8
- OCLC: 18521152
- Dewey Decimal: 813/.52 19
- LC Class: PS3503.E4488 T4 1989

A Theft is a 1989 novel by the American author Saul Bellow. Bellow originally wanted to publish the book as a story or serial in a magazine such as The New Yorker, but his agent had trouble selling it to any magazine. Bellow, instead, chose to publish it as a book, and it was his first book to be published in paperback form. Bellow himself said on the television show Good Morning America that the book had the quality of a hardcover book, but lacked the requisite number of pages and, hence, was published as a trade paperback.

== Plot ==
Clara Velde is a successful fashion writer in New York City and the star of the story. The book's title refers to the disappearance of Clara's prized emerald ring. Clara associates the ring with her love for the Washington, D.C. politico Ithiel and with her own professional and personal power. The ring's apparent theft leads Clara into a series of psychological crises and forces her to confront a long-buried complex of interpersonal issues. Among these is the fact that—despite her four marriages—Ithiel remains her ideal, her best friend, and her ever-uncaptured love. The theft of the ring implicates the young Austrian au pair, Gina, whose Haitian boyfriend, Frederic, must have stolen it. On being accused, Gina resigns and moves from Clara's Upper East Side apartment to East Harlem, a move Clara supposes is an heroic attempt to help recover the ring. How does this practical young woman, Gina, who's going to marry an Austrian banker (following her NYC fling) regard her former employer, Clara? And why should this matter so much to a worldly, successful woman such as herself? Everything hinges on her self-judgment. Despite the scattered miscellany of her marital lives; her very-much-part time commitment to parenting; and the ever-uncertainty of her relationship with Ithiel, her soulmate as she seems to believe, the younger woman sees Clara as somehow coherent: "I believe you pretty well know who you are." With the ring returned, and peace made with Gina, Clara, her messy biography notwithstanding, is prepared to see herself as "one in a xillion" who actually do know who they are.

== Reception ==
Publishers Weekly considered it to be "clever but tender", with Velde being "formidable" and "a vintage Bellow protagonist in skirts", criticizing the ending as "less than full-scale" but praising Bellow's ability to portray characters with "a few nimble sentences". Kirkus Reviews lauded Bellow's prose, but faulted his characterization, calling Velde "more an assemblage of striking attitudes than a fully drawn, believable character", and noting that her maternal role is "particularly flimsy". The Los Angeles Times described it as "a miscellany of plot-bits, a couple of human sketches, (and) an assortment of caricatures", with Velde being "notes for what might become a memorable character" which Bellow "has not bothered to develop", but conceded that Bellow "enjoyed writing it".
