= Benjamin Taylor (author) =

American writer

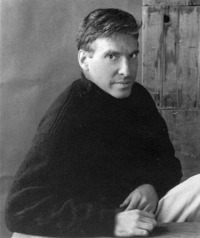
- Born: August 20, 1952; Fort Worth, Texas
- Occupation: Writer
- Writing career
- Period: 1995-present
- Genres: Nonfiction, fiction
- Website: benjamintaylorauthor.com

Signature
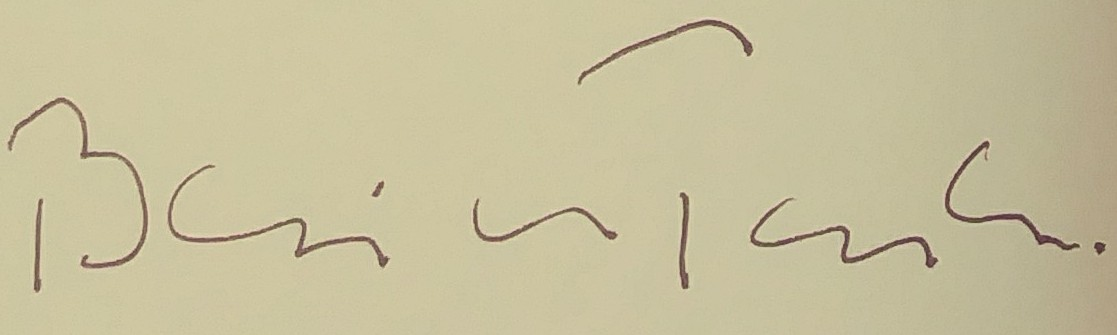

Benjamin Taylor (born 1952) is an American writer whose work has appeared in a number of publications including The Atlantic, Harper's, Esquire, Bookforum, BOMB, the Los Angeles Times, Le Monde, The Georgia Review, Raritan Quarterly Review, Threepenny Review, Salmagundi, Provincetown Arts and The Reading Room. He is a founding member of the Graduate Writing Program faculty of The New School in New York City, and has also taught at Washington University in St. Louis, the Poetry Center of the 92nd Street Y, Bennington College and Columbia University. He has served as Secretary of the Board of Trustees of PEN American Center, has been a fellow of the MacDowell Colony and was awarded the Iphigene Ochs Sulzberger Residency at Yaddo. A Trustee of the Edward F. Albee Foundation, Inc., he is also a Fellow of the New York Institute for the Humanities at New York University and a Guggenheim Fellow for 2012 - 2013. Taylor's biography of Marcel Proust, Proust: The Search, was published in October 2015 by Yale University Press as part of its newly launched Yale Jewish Lives series.

== Early life and education ==
Benjamin Taylor was born and raised in Fort Worth, Texas. He received his B.A. from Haverford College and his Ph.D. in English and comparative literature from Columbia University where his teachers included Joseph A. Mazzeo, Steven Marcus, Paul Oskar Kristeller, Sidney Morgenbesser, Michael Wood, Carl Woodring, Quentin Anderson, Frank Kermode, and Edward W. Said.

== Career ==
Taylor's debut novel, Tales Out of School (Turtle Point Press, 1995), is set on Galveston Island, Texas in 1907 and revolves around the Mehmels, a once prosperous German-Jewish immigrant family whose fortunes are in decline. The novel won the 1996 Harold J. Ribalow Prize and was reissued in 2008 by Zoland Books. Taylor's second novel, The Book of Getting Even (Steerforth Press, 2008), tells the story of Gabriel Geismar, a young aspiring astronomer who becomes involved with a charismatic but troubled family named Hundert. Philip Roth wrote that "The Book of Getting Even is among the most original novels I have read in recent years...[It] is exuberant and charming and heartbroken by turns." Taylor's novel was one of three 2009 Barnes & Noble Discover Award winners, a 2008 Los Angeles Times Favorite Book of the Year, and a Ferro-Grumley Prize Finalist. In October 2009, The Book of Getting Even appeared as El Libro de la Venganza in Spain, where it was named a best book of the year by El País.

In addition to his fiction, Taylor has published a book-length essay titled Into the Open: Reflections on Genius and Modernity (NYU Press, 1995) in which he examines three influential minds—Walter Pater, Paul Valéry, and Sigmund Freud—and how they viewed a figure widely considered the first great modern genius, Leonardo da Vinci.

Taylor's review of Muriel Spark: A Biography by Martin Stannard appeared in the May 2010 issue of Harper's Magazine. He has also edited Saul Bellow: Letters, which appeared on November 4, 2010, from Viking Press. The book is the collected correspondence of Canadian-born American author and Nobel laureate Saul Bellow and includes Bellow's letters to such authors as William Faulkner, Lionel Trilling, Alfred Kazin, Robert Penn Warren, J. F. Powers, John Berryman, John Cheever, Karl Shapiro, Wright Morris, Norman Podhoretz, Philip Roth, Cynthia Ozick, Stanley Elkin, Allan Bloom, Daniel Patrick Moynihan and Martin Amis. A selection of the letters appeared in the April 26, 2010 issue of The New Yorker. Of Saul Bellow: Letters, Leon Wieseltier, in The New York Times Book Review, wrote "Taylor has selected and edited and annotated these letters with exquisite judgment and care. This is an elegantissimo book. Our literature's debt to Taylor, if the culture still cares, is considerable" and New York Times literary critic Michiko Kakutani chose Letters as one of her "Top Ten Books of 2010."

Benjamin Taylor's travel memoir, Naples Declared: A Walk Around the Bay, was released on May 10, 2012, by Marian Wood Books, a division of Penguin (USA). Publishers Weekly named Naples Declared as one of its "Top Ten Travel Books of 2012." Naples Declared was also named a Best Book of 2012 by The New Yorker, where Judith Thurman wrote, "It is a work of voluptuous erudition; a meditation on place and displacement; a paean to the chance encounter—a worldly adventure story...I found it transporting." His edition of the collected non-fiction of Saul Bellow, There Is Simply Too Much to Think About, was published by Viking in March 2015. Writing in the New York Review of Books, Nathaniel Rich described the collection as "magnificent...an intimate portrait of Bellow’s defiant, irascible mind, and a milestone of twentieth-century criticism...The collection offers a triumphant overabundance of riches—which is exactly why we read Bellow in the first place."

Taylor's biography of Marcel Proust, Proust: The Search, was chosen as a "Best Book of 2015" by Robert McCrum of The Observer and Thomas Mallon of the New York Times Book Review.

In 2017, Penguin Random House released The Hue and Cry at Our House: A Year Remembered, a memoir of one year in Taylor's childhood in Fort Worth, Texas, following the assassination of President John F. Kennedy. It won the 2017 Los Angeles Times – Christopher Isherwood Prize for Autobiographical Prose. Later that year, Farrar, Straus and Giroux released Debriefing: Collected Stories of Susan Sontag, which was edited by Taylor.

Taylor published his memoir, Here We Are: My Friendship with Philip Roth, in May 2020 by Penguin Books. This memoir received the acclaim to being a finalist for the National Jewish Book Award.

In 2021, Taylor received a Literature Award from the American Academy of Arts and Letters.

In 2023, Taylor’s memoir Here We Are: My Friendship with Philip Roth was obtained by Daryl Roth Productions for Broadway.

Taylor appeared on the March 16, 2012, episode of the ABC series Primetime: What Would You Do?. He was shown berating an actress portraying an abusive fashion editor.

== Bibliography ==
Non-fiction

- Into the Open: Reflections on Genius and Modernity (1995)
- Saul Bellow: Letters, Editor (2010)
- Naples Declared (2012)
- There Is Simply Too Much to Think About: Collected Non-Fiction of Saul Bellow, Editor (2015)
- Proust: The Search (2015)
- The Hue and Cry at Our House: A Year Remembered (2017)
- Debriefing: Collected Stories of Susan Sontag, Editor (2017)
- Here We Are: My Friendship with Philip Roth (2020)
- Chasing Bright Medusas: A Life of Willa Cather (2023)

Fiction

- Tales Out of School (1995)
- The Book of Getting Even (2008)

Other

- "Prodigal Son" essay by Taylor that appears in Loss Within Loss: Artists in the Age of AIDS, edited by Edmund White, The University of Wisconsin Press, 2001
