= Edward Benjamin Shils =

American academic (1915–2004)

Edward Benjamin Shils (May 17, 1915 – November 14, 2004) was a noted and innovative management professor, who received six degrees from the University of Pennsylvania, an institution at which he taught for over five decades. Shils most significant contribution to Penn was the 1973 founding of the Wharton Entrepreneurial Center, renamed in 1985 to the Sol C. Snider Entrepreneurial Center, at Penn's Wharton School of Business. While entrepreneurship is widely accepted as an academic discipline today, the Center was the first of its kind in the world. Shils served as the Center's director until 1986.

Shils described the impetus in founding the center as, "I felt the way to get students interested in creating things was to hear from people who had been successful creating them." "I found that most of these huge corporations had all the seeds of bureaucracy in them. They really wanted 'me too' guys and gals rather than people who would challenge what they were doing. Today, with what we've been teaching in our program, we've begun to turn the big corporations around."

Shils had earned six degrees at Penn (W '36, G '37, GR '40, L '86, GL '90, GRL '97). The first three degrees (Bachelors, Masters, Doctorate) were all earned in the normal course. However, after a long career as a professor and chair of the management department at Wharton and founding the Entrepreneurial Center, Shils returned to law school and received his law degree and two other degrees from the University of Pennsylvania Law School. He subsequently passed the Pennsylvania Bar Exam and operated a law practice from his Center City consulting office.

For 50 years, Shils served as Executive Director of the Dental Manufacturers of America and the Dental Dealers of America. After his death, the dental industry established the Edward B. Shils Entrepreneurial Education Fund in his honor.
