= Ravelstein =

2000 novel by Saul Bellow

- First edition
- Author: Saul Bellow
- Cover artist: Richard Dunkley
- Language: English
- Publisher: Viking Press
- Publication date: 24 April 2000
- Publication place: United States
- Media type: Print (hardcover and paperback)
- Pages: 240
- ISBN: 0-670-84134-X (hardback edition)
- OCLC: 42780381
- Dewey Decimal: 813/.52 21
- LC Class: PS3503.E4488 R38 2000

Ravelstein is Saul Bellow's final novel. Published in 2000, when Bellow was eighty-five years old, it received widespread critical acclaim. It tells the tale of a friendship between a university professor and a writer, and the complications that animate their erotic and intellectual attachments in the face of impending death. The novel is a roman à clef written in the form of a memoir. The narrator is in Paris with Abe Ravelstein, a renowned professor, and Nikki, his lover. Ravelstein, who is dying, asks the narrator to write a memoir about him after he dies. After his death, the narrator and his wife go on holiday to the Caribbean. The narrator catches a tropical disease and flies back to the United States to convalesce. Eventually, on recuperation, he decides to write the memoir.

The title character, Ravelstein, is based on the philosopher Allan Bloom, who taught alongside Bellow at the University of Chicago's Committee on Social Thought. Remembering Bloom in an interview, Bellow said, "Allan inhaled books and ideas the way the rest of us breathe air. ... People only want the factual truth. Well, the truth is that Allan was a very superior person, great-souled. When critics proclaim the death of the novel, I sometimes think they are really saying that there are no significant people to write about", but "Allan was certainly one."

== Characters ==
- Abe Ravelstein, a 6 ft 6 in (198 cm) tall, renowned professor of philosophy at the University of Chicago, based on Allan Bloom. Ravelstein studied under Felix Davarr and Alexandre Kojève.
- Nikki, Abe's Singapore-born Malaysian lover, modeled on Bloom's real life lover, Michael Wu.
- The narrator, a long-time friend of Ravelstein's who is somewhat older than him. Ravelstein refers to him by the nickname "Chick", but he otherwise remains nameless.
- Vela, the narrator's previous wife, a beautiful Romanian chaos theorist. Vela is based on Alexandra Bellow.
- Rosamund, the narrator's current wife. Based on Bellow's wife Janis Freedman.
- Rakhmiel Kogon, another professor who is a colleague of Ravelstein. The character is based on Bellow's friend Edward Shils.
- Marla Glyph, the wife (dead before the main action of the novel begins) of the chair of Ravelstein's university department.
- Ruby Tyson, Ravelstein's cleaning lady.
- Felix Davarr, a now-deceased academic and teacher/mentor of Ravelstein, based on Leo Strauss.
- Dr. Schley, cardiologist to both the narrator and Ravelstein.
- Professor Radu Grielescu, a Jungian professor rumoured to have been a Nazi sympathizer during World War II, who is modeled directly on Bellow's friend and colleague, the Romanian historian Mircea Eliade.
- Morris Herbst, a professor friend of Ravelstein's, based on Bloom's friend, Werner Dannhauser.
- Battle, a British professor who moves to Wisconsin with his wife to retire; based on the British geographer Paul Wheatley.
- Sam Partiger, a friend of the narrator's who is introduced to Ravelstein.
- Roxie Durkin, a friend of Rosamund's.
- Dr. Bakst, the narrator's neurologist.
- Phil Gorman, Ravelstein's former student and now "one of the Secretary [of State]'s closest advisers", modeled on Paul Wolfowitz.

== Literary significance and criticism ==
=== Literary reception ===
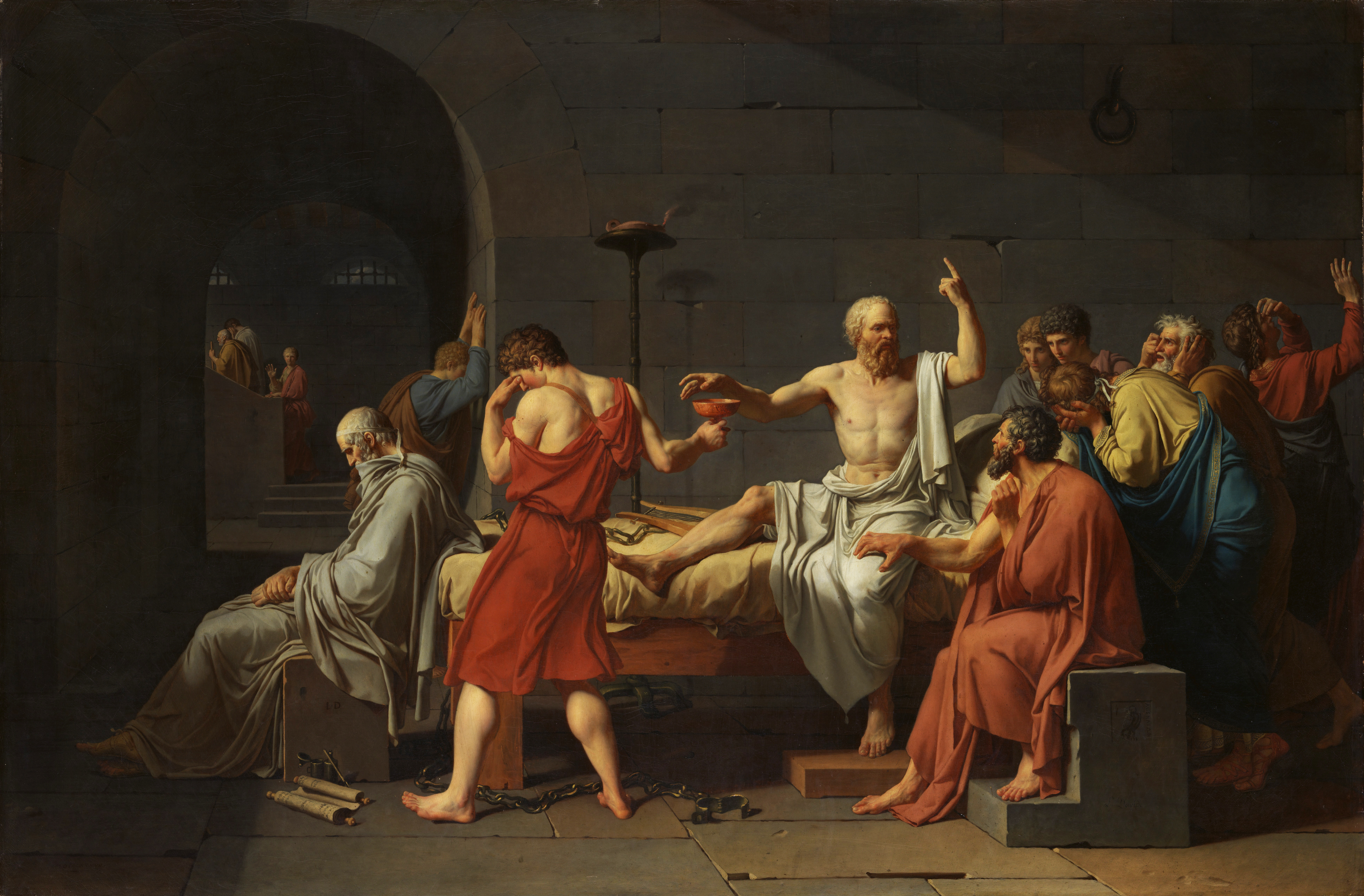
The Death of Socrates by David

Describing the novel in his memoir Experience, Martin Amis wrote: "Ravelstein is a full-length novel. It is also, in my view, a masterpiece with no analogues. The world has never heard this prose before: prose of such tremulous and crystallized beauty. ... [Ravelstein is] numinous. It constitutes an act of resuscitation, and in its pages Bloom lives."

The literary theorist John Sutherland wrote: "The novel explores, in its attractively rambling way, two dauntingly large and touchy themes: death and American Jewishness. ... Not quite American (as the Canadian-born Jew Bellow is not quite American), Abe Ravelstein is the American mind and Bellow its finest living (thank God) voice. We should all have such friends."

The literary critic Sir Malcolm Bradbury stated: "Just when we didn't expect it, there now wonderfully comes a large new novel from the master. ... Our world is a world of ideas, pervaded by minds, thoughts, notions, beyond which lies what we seek with such difficulty: wholeness, silence and love. Via print, Ravelstein survives; and Bellow survives. So does fiction itself."

William Leith, writing in The Independent, argued: "As you would expect, Ravelstein, as a character, is beautifully drawn. He is 'impatient with hygiene'. He smokes constantly. 'When he coughed you heard the sump at the bottom of a mine shaft echoing.' His 'biological patchiness was a given'. Those who invite him to dinner must reckon with 'the spilling, splashing, crumbling, the nastiness of his napkin after he had used it, the pieces of cooked meat scattered under the table'. Like many Bellow characters, he has developed a mean streak. 'Nothing,' he declares, 'is more bourgeois than the fear of death.' ... This is the late late message from Bellow: death is humiliating. But there might be consolations. I almost forgot to say that Ravelstein is a brilliant novel"

For Ron Rosenbaum, Ravelstein is Bellow's greatest novel: "It's a rapturous celebration of the life of the mind, as well as a meditation on the glory of sensual life and on the tenebrous permeable boundary we all eventually pass over, the one between life and death. ... a novel Bellow wrote in his 80s, which I found absolutely, irresistibly seductive, both sensually and intellectually, one in which the sublimity and pathos of life and art are not joined to each other with heavy welds but transformed into a beautiful, seamless, unravelable fabric."

On its publication, the Harvard literary critic James Wood wrote: "How extraordinary, then, that Bellow's substantial new novel, Ravelstein, written in his 85th year, should be so full of the old, cascading power. ... Ravelstein ... is large, flamboyant, and excessively clumsy. When he laughs, he throws his head back 'like Picasso's wounded horse in Guernica.' He loves fine clothes, Lanvin jackets, Zegna ties, but tends to spill food on them. Hostesses know to put newspaper underneath Ravelstein's chair at a dinner party. At home, he wanders around in an exquisite silk dressing gown, chain-smoking. His apartment is stuffed with beautiful glass and silverware, with the finest Italian and French linens, and thousands of CDs. He reclines on a black leather couch, listening to Baroque music, is enormously learned, and given to oration on a thousand subjects. ... By all accounts, including Bellow's, this is Allan Bloom as his friends knew him."

=== Controversy ===
"There was no counting the cigarettes he lit in a day. Most of them he forgot or broke. ... But to prolong his life was not one of Ravelstein's aims. Risk, limit, death's blackout were present in every living moment." - Saul Bellow, Ravelstein

On its publication, the novel caused controversy because of its frank depiction of Ravelstein's (and therefore Allan Bloom's) love of gossip, free spending, political influence, and homosexuality, as well as the revelation, as the story unfolds, that he is dying from AIDS.

Bellow claimed that Bloom, a philosopher and social critic who was ostensibly aligned with many American conservative ideas and ambitions, was anything but conservative in his private life or in many of his philosophical views. As the journalist Robert Fulford pointed out: "Remarkably, no reference to Bloom's homosexuality has previously appeared in print — not in the publicity that surrounded his best-seller, or his obituaries, or even his posthumously published book, Love and Friendship." Accordingly, some took Ravelstein as a betrayal of Bloom's private life. However, Bellow vigorously defended his claims, citing private conversations between Bloom and himself in which Bloom urged Bellow to tell it all. Bloom was not a "closeted" homosexual: although he never spoke publicly of his sexual orientation, he was openly gay, and his close friends, colleagues, and former students all knew of it. He was a bachelor and never married or had children.

In his most famous book, The Closing of the American Mind, Bloom criticized homosexual politics in American universities on an issue relating to his core concern, liberal arts education, or the "Great Books" liberal arts curriculum, making a distinction between a politically self-defined group of homosexual activists and homosexuality per se. Although Bloom, in the wake of his literary stardom, explicitly stated, at a Harvard University gathering (published in Giants and Dwarfs), that he was not a conservative, he was much admired by writers in conservative publications such as William F. Buckley, Jr's National Review.

Arguing in support of Bloom in The New Republic, Andrew Sullivan wrote: "Bloom was gay, and he died of AIDS. The salience of these facts is strengthened, not weakened, by Bloom's public silence about them. Of all people, he knew the centrality of the things about which we remain silent. ... Retaining the purity of that longing was his life's work. The reason he disliked the modern cult of easy sex was not because he scorned or feared the erotic life, but because he revered it. He saw sexual longing as supremely expressed in individual love, and he wanted his students to experience both to the fullest. He not merely understood Nietzsche; he imbibed him. But this awareness of the abyss moved Bloom, unlike Nietzsche, toward love. ... One day, one hopes, there will be a conservatism civilized enough to deserve him ..."

=== Text ===
Typical of Bellow's most accessible fiction, and resembling his short novel Seize the Day, Ravelstein mixes dialogue, narration, and unanswered questions. Abe Ravelstein is a paradox - the serious and mundane, the corporeal and spiritual, the conservative and radical. The one constant is the kindly friendship between "Chick" and Ravelstein. Few intellectual or personal subjects are taboo. Chick makes it clear that Ravelstein thinks he is too old to become a philosopher.

"He didn't ask, "Where will you spend eternity?" as religious the-end-is-near picketers did, but rather, "With what, in this modern democracy, will you meet the demands of your soul?""

- Saul Bellow, Ravelstein

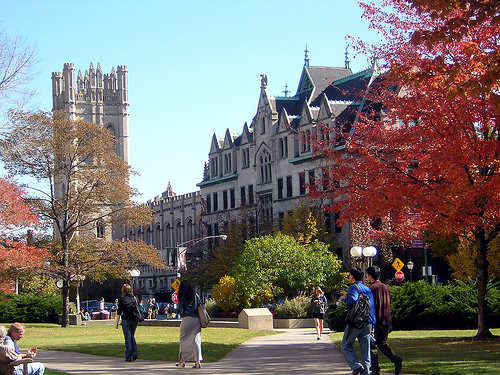
University of Chicago

The story follows the physical decline of Ravelstein, a University of Chicago professor, and how his recent literary fame and financial success have changed his life. After Ravelstein's death, the remainder of the work deals with the narrator's own illness and hospitalization. Ravelstein is not aloof or uninterested in everyday life. He is a consumer of goods and gossip, eagerly meeting people where they exist, without constructing artificial barriers based on presumed superiority. His friendships do not solely revolve around his own interests and concerns. Thoughts and opinions expressed by Ravelstein are often humorous. Upon lighting a cigarette to open a class, he mentions that students who dislike tobacco more than they love ideas will not be missed. He even rearranges the love lives of his students, often without being asked, going so far as to ask them to return with any gossip that isn't treason to repeat.

== Audiobook ==
In 2009, Audible.com produced an audio version of Ravelstein, narrated by Peter Ganim, as part of its Modern Vanguard line of audiobooks. In 2015, Blackstone Audio produced an audio version of Ravelstein, narrated by Richard Poe.
