= Dangling Man =

Novel by Saul Bellow

- First edition cover
- Author: Saul Bellow
- Language: English
- Publisher: Vanguard Press
- Publication date: 1944
- Publication place: United States
- Media type: Print (Hardback & Paperback)

Dangling Man is a 1944 novel by Saul Bellow. It is his first published work.

== Plot summary ==
Written in diary format, the story centers on the life of an unemployed young man named Joseph, his relationships with his wife and friends, and his frustrations with living in Chicago and waiting to be drafted. His diary serves as a philosophical confessional for his musings. It ends with his entrance into the army during World War II, and a hope that the regimentation of army life will relieve his suffering. Along with Bellow's second novel The Victim, it is considered his "apprentice" work.

== Reception ==
Some critics, including Edmund Wilson and Kenneth Fearing, criticized the novel's lack of a definite plot, but praised Bellow's depiction of what they saw as the characteristic features of the generation of American intellectuals raised during the Great Depression. Dangling Man can be seen as a superfluous man narrative, raising interesting parallels with Turgenev's The Diary of a Superfluous Man and exploring the 19th-century Russian literary concept through a contemporary American experience.

Irving S. Saposnik, in The Centennial Review, wrote that "None of Saul Bellow's other novel's (sic) has perplexed his critics more than his first novel, Dangling Man.

=== References in other works ===
The title Dangling Man, an episode of the television show The Crown, references the work. Prince Charles, as portrayed by Josh O'Connor, compares himself to Joseph during the episode.
