= More Die of Heartbreak =

1987 novel by Saul Bellow

- First edition
- Author: Saul Bellow
- Cover artist: Cheryl Asherman
- Language: English
- Publisher: William Morrow
- Publication date: 1987
- Publication place: United States
- Media type: Print (hardback & paperback)
- ISBN: 0-688-06935-5

More Die of Heartbreak is a 1987 novel by the American author Saul Bellow, first published by William Morrow and Company. and was his tenth novel. Like most of Bellow's other works, More Die of Heartbreak is grounded more in the development of character than in the growth of action. Among its themes are the difficulties of reconciling one's ideals with "the actual" and the difficulties of relating to parents and to mortality. The protagonist of the novel, Kenneth Trachtenberg, is an intellectually gifted and philosophically tortured man attempting to work out his fate and worldview.

== Plot summary ==
The book opens with an introduction of characters, and with Trachtenberg, the narrator, describing his complex relationship with his maternal uncle, Benn Crader, a world-renowned botanist. He then discusses the distinctions between himself, and his father, a man who, as he describes him, “[puts] on the kind of sex display you see in nature films, the courting behavior of turkey cocks or any of the leggier birds… Dad was a hit with women.”

This theme continues throughout the book, with Kenneth accepting his difficulties with women. He also introduces his mother, a woman who allowed her husband to step out, and only left after realizing that he did not understand what made her happy. She wanted intellectual stimulation of a literary style, whereas he bought her materialistic goods to make up for his infidelities. To atone for receiving the goods she did not need, Kenneth's mother is now living among refugees in Africa.

Kenneth then embarks on an overview of Benn's recent sexual history. He presents a man who, while appreciative of beauty and women, is not quite rooted enough in human society to understand the sexual pretexts he encounters. One incident is discussed many times during the novel: a middle aged neighbor of Benn's, an attractive professional who has a slight drinking problem, asks Benn to help her change a light bulb, a not too subtle hint which Benn ignores until she makes a move. The next day, when he shows no interest, and expresses regret for the act, she exclaims, “What am I supposed to do with my sexuality?” Benn then attracts the attentions of another older woman, Caroline who is controlling, indifferent, and loving all at the same time.

While Benn, unbeknownst to Kenneth, is dealing with a planned wedding to Caroline, the protagonist is in Seattle to discuss with his ex-girlfriend, Treckie, what they should do about raising their child, now three years old. Treckie, a beautiful, half-sized woman, has been seeing another man, a fact Kenneth knows because of the bruises on her legs - lovemaking injuries he refused to ever give her. Kenneth has discussed this peculiar fetish with his father, who knows women, and received the knowledge that some smaller women must do it to show they are women, and not fully matured girls, the perception they give off.

Benn, escaping from the wedding to Caroline, flies to Kyoto at the expense of a lecture series, inviting Kenneth to join him. The Japanese sense of order and utility appeals to Benn, until a strip show he sees at the insistence of his colleagues upsets him with its overt sexuality, at which point, he and Kenneth return to their home in the Midwest.

Benn's next partner is Matilda Layamon, a beautiful, Midwestern daughter, who wants to settle down with a distinguished, older man who can calm her wild side. Benn, perhaps fearing that Kenneth will convince him that it is a foolhardy idea, weds her without “Kenneth’s permission.”

Matilda's father is a rectangular man with sharp, thin shoulders who is a doctor, and in fact, asks that he be called, “Doctor.” He serves the rich, and because of this, has one-percentage point interests in many businesses around the country - an accidental fortune. He is a scheming man, and other than a few disagreements between Benn, and the man, no conflicts occur until he attempts to take advantage of Benn's uncle, a man who, as executor of the will of the Crader mother, undersold, and unfairly bought the Crader home, selling the land to a company which built a tower there, resulting in millions of dollars of profit for Uncle Vilitzer, and pennies for the Crader children. Because Vilitzer controlled the judge, neither Benn nor Kenneth's mother received their fair share, and the Doctor hopes to correct this, so that Matilda will have a rich husband.

In the end, Vilitzer dies after a heated discussion with Kenneth and Benn, and Benn, attending the funeral, sends his wife ahead to their honeymoon, and changes his ticket for the North Pole. He relays this to Kenneth who now lives in Benn's apartment, and who has recently returned from a successful bid to Treckie that he have his daughter for a part of the year. He is aware of her impending marriage thanks to a self-expedient phone call that revealed this information.

The book ends with a conversation between the two professors in which both stories are relayed to each other.
