= Seize the Day (novel) =

1956 short story collection by Saul Bellow

- First edition
- Author: Saul Bellow
- Language: English
- Publisher: Viking Press
- Publication date: November 15, 1956
- Publication place: United States
- Media type: Print (Hardcover & Paperback)
- Pages: 128

Seize the Day, first published in 1956, is Saul Bellow's fourth book, containing the title novella, three short stories, and a one-act play. A review in The New Republic said it contained "at least three brilliant stories", and concluded, "Altogether, Bellow seems more suited by temperament and ability than any writer of his generation to create for America 'the untreated conscience' of modern man." The book was a finalist for the 1957 National Book Award for Fiction.

The title novella was adapted into the 1986 film of the same name.

== Synopsis ==
The title story centers on a day in the life of Wilhelm Adler (a.k.a. Tommy Wilhelm), a failed actor in his forties. He is poor, unemployed and separated from his wife (who refuses to agree to a divorce). He is also estranged from his children and his father, a highly regarded former doctor who lives in the same Broadway building. Wilhelm is immature and lacks insight, which has brought him to failure. In "Seize the Day", Wilhelm experiences a day of reckoning as he is forced to examine his life and to accept the "burden of self".
