= The Actual (novel) =

1997 novella by Saul Bellow

- First edition cover
- Author: Saul Bellow
- Language: English
- Publisher: Viking/Penguin Books
- Publication date: 1997
- Publication place: United States
- Media type: Print (Hardback & Paperback)
- Pages: 104
- ISBN: 0-670-86075-1
- OCLC: 36017249
- Dewey Decimal: 813/.52 21
- LC Class: PS3503.E4488 A63 1997

The Actual is a 1997 novella by the American author Saul Bellow.

== Plot synopsis ==
Like most of Bellow's fiction, the story centers on the lives of a group of passionate and anxious people living in Chicago. Harry Trellman has formed a friendship with the fabulously wealthy Sigmund Adletsky. Sigmund aims to bring Harry together with Harry's childhood sweetheart, Amy Wustrin.

== Reception ==
Publishers Weekly called it "(a) kind of an affectionate, latter-day 'Lovesong of J. Alfred Prufrock", in which "plot (is) secondary". Kirkus Reviews considered it to be "witty" and "sharp", with "vividly sketched characters" but "perfunctory" plotting. In the Guardian, Martin Amis called it "scrupulously written".
