= The Adventures of Augie March =

1953 novel by Saul Bellow

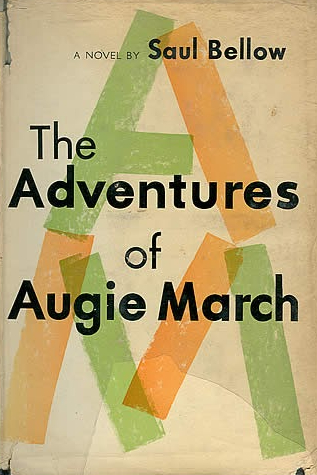
- First edition cover
- Author: Saul Bellow
- Language: English
- Genre: Picaresque novel, Bildungsroman
- Publisher: Viking Press
- Publication date: September 18, 1953
- Publication place: United States
- Media type: Print (hardcover & paperback)
- Pages: 586
- Dewey Decimal: 813.52
- LC Class: PS3503 .E446 A57

The Adventures of Augie March is a picaresque novel by Saul Bellow, published in 1953 by Viking Press. It features the eponymous Augie March, who grows up during the Great Depression, and it is an example of Bildungsroman, tracing the development of an individual through a series of encounters, occupations and relationships from boyhood to manhood.

The Adventures of Augie March won the 1954 U.S. National Book Award for Fiction. Both Time magazine and the Modern Library Board named it one of the hundred best novels in the English language.

== Plot summary ==
The story describes Augie March's growth from childhood to a fairly stable maturity. Augie, with his brother Simon and the mentally abnormal George have no father and are brought up by their mother, who is losing her eyesight, and a tyrannical, grandmother-like boarder, in very humble circumstances in the rough parts of Chicago. Augie drifts from one situation to another in a free-wheeling manner — jobs, women, homes, education and lifestyle.

Augie March's path seems to be partly self-made and partly comes around through chance. In lifestyle he ranges from near adoption by a wealthy couple who spoil him, to a struggle for existence stealing books and helping out friends in desperate straits. His most unusual adventure is his flight to Mexico with the wild and irrepressible Thea who tries to catch lizards with an eagle. Thea attempts to convince Augie to join her in this seemingly impossible task.

His jobs include general assistance to the slightly corrupt Einhorn, helping in a dog training parlor, working for his brother at a coal-tip, and working for the Congress of Industrial Organizations until finally he joins the merchant navy in the war.

Augie attracts and gets involved with a string of different women. Firstly a casual acquaintance as a youth, he gets engaged to a wealthy cousin of his brother's wife. However, through a scandal not of his fault, he is discarded. After a casual affair with Sophie, a Greek hotel maid, he is swept off by Thea, whom he had met when living with the rich Renlings and who forecast their relationship even though he loved her sister. After the fiasco in Mexico, where he suffered a terrible accident on a horse, he and Thea began drifting apart; he spending his time playing cards and she hunting for snakes and lizards in the mountains. Their inevitable split came the night he agreed to drive another woman, Stella, to another town to escape her troubled boyfriend. After the break-up, Augie returned to Chicago and picked back up with Sophie until joining the merchant navy and heading to New York. There he met up with Stella again and married her.

All through the book, Augie is encouraged into education, but never quite seems to make it; he reads a great deal for himself and develops a philosophy of life. Something or somebody always tends to crop up, turning his path before Augie seriously considers returning to education.

During the war, his ship is sunk and he suffers a difficult episode in a lifeboat with a man who turns out to be a lunatic. After rescue, he returns to Stella and the book ends with them living a slightly dubious existence in France, he involved in some fairly shady business deals and she attempting to pursue a career in acting.

== Literary significance and criticism ==
The Adventures of Augie March can be seen as a dispelling of the traditional idea of an American hero. He is "the American chasing after self-exploration." He is given a background common of protagonists in inspirational American stories; "he comes from a poor family; he does not know the identity of his father; he refuses to be trapped by fine clothing, social position, or wealth," and he has plenty of "heroic qualities" such as his intelligence, compassion, and clear observation. However, despite these advantages, Augie does not truly live out the life of a hero. He has no commitments of his own, and merely goes along with plans and schemes developed by others. He never truly decides what he wants to do with himself, and "manages a deep enthusiasm just twice in the novel: he falls in love twice...The first experience fails completely; and the second, as the novels ends, is failing." Everyone around Augie finds a greater measure of success than he does because they commit themselves to some pursuit or goal, even if it is not the most noble. Ultimately, though Augie has every chance to succeed in the world, he never does so because he refuses to engage in that world, and instead keeps chasing the vague "better fate" he has convinced himself he deserves. Through this Bellow makes his case that a sharp mind and pure ideals are of no value if they are not coupled with active pursuit and a clear understanding of one's relationship with others.

Widely heralded as a classic of American literature, the novel was named one of the 100 best novels in the English language by TIME magazine (best in the history of TIME, 1923 to 2005) and by Modern Library (number 81 of the editorial board's 20th-century hundred).

As a novel "centering on the quest for identity", it has been compared to novels as diverse as The Adventures of Huckleberry Finn, Moby-Dick and The Catcher in the Rye.

== Cultural references ==
- The Australian band Augie March take their name from the title of this book. They are known for their descriptive, literary lyrical content.
- Irish singer/songwriter Fionn Regan references this book in his song "Put a Penny in the Slot".
- The surname of the lead character, Syd March, in Brandon Cronenberg's Antiviral (2012), is a reference to this book's lead character.
