= The Victim (novel) =

1947 novel by Saul Bellow

- First edition
- Author: Saul Bellow
- Language: English
- Publisher: Vanguard Press 1947
- Publication place: United States
- Media type: Print (Hardback & Paperback)

The Victim is a novel by Saul Bellow published in 1947.

As in much of Bellow's fiction, the protagonist is a Jewish man in early middle age. Leventhal lives in New York City. While his wife is away on family business, Leventhal is haunted by an old acquaintance who unjustly claims that Leventhal has been the cause of his misfortune. The story explores the men's evolving relationship, all while Leventhal is struggling to deal with his own family problems.

== Plot summary ==
Asa Leventhal's wife Mary has left the city for a few weeks in order to help her elderly mother move from Baltimore to her old family home in the South. While she is away, Leventhal must take on many tasks of caring for himself which his wife would ordinarily undertake for him. The action of the story begins when Leventhal is at his job as a copy-editor and receives a frantic phone call from his sister-in-law. She tells him that his nephew is terribly ill and that she desperately needs his assistance. During their conversation we learn that Asa's brother Max is a negligent husband and father who has practically abandoned his wife and two sons for itinerant work in Texas. His family subsists on the money he sends to them.

On his way to his brother's apartment, Leventhal reflects on the annoyance of being disturbed at work and the shameful treatment which Max is visiting upon his young family. But these reflections quickly take on a tone of self-reproach as Leventhal briefly admits to himself that he has allowed his obligation to this extended family to lapse inexcusably. Throughout the novel, Leventhal flirts with the possibility of widening his arc of responsibility to include humans other than himself and his wife. Usually, however, he finds a way to preserve his positive image of himself and to shirk responsibility for others.

This theme is expanded one evening when Leventhal, while walking in the park, is abruptly confronted by a man whose face he is unable immediately to place. Slowly, through conversation and subterfuge, the stranger reveals himself to be an old acquaintance named Kirby Allbee. Leventhal initially regards Allbee, who looks down on his luck, with a mixture of alarm and pity, but is swiftly put on guard, for Allbee's stream of false courtesy is barbed with antisemitism, and it emerges that Allbee holds Leventhal responsible for his having lost his job at some point in the past.

As they stand there, Leventhal scrambles to recall the details of their acquaintance. He does recall Allbee's references to a party at which Allbee had angered Leventhal with antisemitic remarks, and also that, while looking for a job himself, he had had a disastrous interview with Allbee's old boss. But Allbee has clearly become a 'crank' and a drunk, and Leventhal at first rejects out of hand Allbee's accusation that Leventhal's disastrous interview has lost him his job. Allbee asserts that Leventhal's angry behavior at the interview was deliberate provocation, payback for Allbee's antisemitic remarks at the party, directed at Leventhal's close friend, Dan Harkavy, who had nonetheless contacted Allbee to help secure the disastrous interview for Leventhal.

Allbee confronts Leventhal several more times over the following weeks and it is revealed that in recent years Allbee has led a life of dissipation and poverty. The loss of his job, his wife's subsequent decision to leave him and her ultimate death in an auto accident have left him without resources. Leventhal mulls over his angry behavior at the interview and begins, despite the fact that Allbee is stalking him and spying on him and eventually turns up on his doorstep late at night, to accept some degree of responsibility. He enters into painful introspection about his stance toward others and interpretations of their behavior. We learn that Leventhal's mother was institutionalized for mental illness, that Leventhal's 'nerves' are shot, and thus despite Allbee's alarming behavior the reader accepts Leventhal's doubts about his own assessments of people's motives.

Interwoven with his struggles with Allbee are Leventhal's uneasy interactions with the family of his brother Max. After his initial visit to their lowly apartment, Leventhal is convinced that Max has neglected his young wife and children unconscionably and he resolves to give Max a piece of his mind. Leventhal convinces his sister-in-law to allow her son to be admitted to a hospital for treatment. When the young boy takes a turn for the worse, Max returns to the city just at the time of his son's death.

Bellow uses the twin events of the death of Leventhal's nephew and the jarring conflict with Allbee to portray a period of self-examination and growth in the life of the protagonist. Although his tangles with Allbee nearly end in disaster, he parts with his brother on good terms, and in a final chapter, we learn that he has been promoted, looks younger despite graying hair, and is about to become a father.

The end describes a chance meeting between Leventhal and his old tormentor Allbee—both early-middle-aged, in a theatre, just before the final act. Allbee's fortunes are superficially reversed: he is dating a Hollywood actress and is richly attired. Leventhal is dismayed when Allbee hails him, but Allbee comes close to apologizing for his past aggression, saying that now he has learned that 'the world wasn't made exactly for me' and that he has come to terms with 'whoever runs things'. But since Allbee has in the past bruited his belief that 'the Jews' run everything, Leventhal's parting words to him are, 'Wait a minute, what's your idea of who runs things?' Poignantly, we part with Leventhal and his 9-months-pregnant wife in the dark, being shown to their seats by an invisible 'usher'.
