= Humboldt's Gift =

1975 novel by Saul Bellow

- Author: Saul Bellow
- Cover artist: Mel Williamson
- Language: English
- Publisher: Viking Press
- Publication date: 1975
- Publication place: United States
- Media type: Print (hardcover & paperback)
- Pages: 487
- ISBN: 0-670-38655-3
- OCLC: 1339692
- Dewey Decimal: 813/.5/2
- LC Class: PZ3.B41937 Hu PS3503.E4488
- Preceded by: Mr. Sammler's Planet
- Followed by: The Dean's December

Humboldt's Gift is a 1975 novel by Canadian-American author Saul Bellow. It won the 1976 Pulitzer Prize for Fiction and contributed to Bellow's winning the Nobel Prize in Literature the same year.

== Plot ==
The novel, which Bellow initially intended to be a short story, is a roman à clef about Bellow's friendship with the poet Delmore Schwartz. It explores the changing relationship of art and power in a materialist America. This theme is addressed through the contrasting careers of two writers, Von Humboldt Fleisher (to some degree a version of Schwartz) and his protégé Charlie Citrine (to some degree a version of Bellow himself). Fleisher yearns to lift American society through art, but dies a failure. By contrast, Charlie Citrine makes a lot of money through his writing, especially from a Broadway play and a movie about a character named Von Trenck – a character modeled after Fleisher.

Another notable character in the book is Rinaldo Cantabile, a wannabe Chicago gangster, who tries to bully Citrine into being friends. Because his career advice to Citrine is commercially fixated, it is directly opposed to advice from Citrine's former mentor, Humboldt Fleisher, who prioritizes artistic integrity.

== Reception ==
Humboldt's Gift won the 1976 Pulitzer Prize for Fiction, Bellow's first after three previous works were recommended for the award by various juries. (Pulitzer finalists were not formally designated until 1980.) In the novel Humboldt says, and Citrine agrees, that the prize is "a dummy newspaper publicity award given by crooks and illiterates". When asked about the description after winning the prize, Bellow laughed and said that he would accept the award "in dignified silence".

Some critics, including Malcolm Bradbury, see the novel as a commentary on the increasing commodification of culture in mid-century America. Throughout much of the book, Bellow also analyzes, through the voice of Citrine, his thoughts on spirituality, poetry, and success in America.

Alvin Kernan, in his 1982 book The Imaginary Library, included a chapter on Humboldt's Gift, arguing that the novel is representative of the declining relevance of the Romantic conception of literature to contemporary life.
