= Mr. Sammler's Planet =

1970 novel by Saul Bellow

- First edition
- Author: Saul Bellow
- Cover artist: Mel Williamson
- Language: English
- Publisher: Viking Press
- Publication date: 1970
- Publication place: United States
- Media type: Print
- Pages: 313
- ISBN: 0-670-49322-8

Mr. Sammler's Planet is a 1970 novel by the American author Saul Bellow. It won the National Book Award for Fiction in 1971.

== Plot synopsis ==
Mr. Artur Sammler, a Holocaust survivor, intellectual and occasional lecturer at Columbia University in 1960s New York City, is a "registrar of madness", a refined and civilized being caught among people crazy with the promises of the future – Moon landings, endless possibilities. "Sorry for all and sore at heart", he observes how greater luxury and leisure have only led to more human suffering.

To Mr. Sammler—who by the end of the novel has found the compassionate consciousness necessary to bridge the gap between himself and his fellow beings—a good life is one in which a person does what is "required of him". To know and to meet the "terms of the contract" was as true a life as one could live.

== Literary significance and criticism ==
Some critics have pigeonholed the novel as a response to the Holocaust or as a Jeremiad against 1960s social mores—and it is true that Sammler is horrified by those mores because, as Philip Roth pointed out, he views them as "the betrayal by the crazy species of the civilized ideal"—whilst others have noted that the novel revolves, as does Herzog, around Sammler's conflicts between intellect and intuition, between acting in the world and standing aside to observe it. In a slowly building epiphany at the novel's end, Sammler finds a balance. Joyce Carol Oates wrote that she admired "the conclusion of Mr. Sammler's Planet, which is so powerful that it forces us to immediately reread the entire novel, because we have been altered in the process of reading it and are now, at its conclusion, ready to begin reading it".

At the conclusion, Sammler speaks to God. Referring either to the existence of objective moral truths or to the existence of God Himself, he says "For that is the truth of it — that we all know, God, that we know, that we know, we know, we know". In a lecture a few years later, asked to explain those lines, Bellow said "You read the New Testament and the assumption Jesus makes continually is that people know the difference immediately between good and evil... And that is in part what faith means. It doesn't even require discussion. It means that there is an implicit knowledge — very ancient if not eternal — which human beings really share and that if they based their relationships on that knowledge existence could be transformed".
