= Herzog (novel) =

1964 novel by Saul Bellow

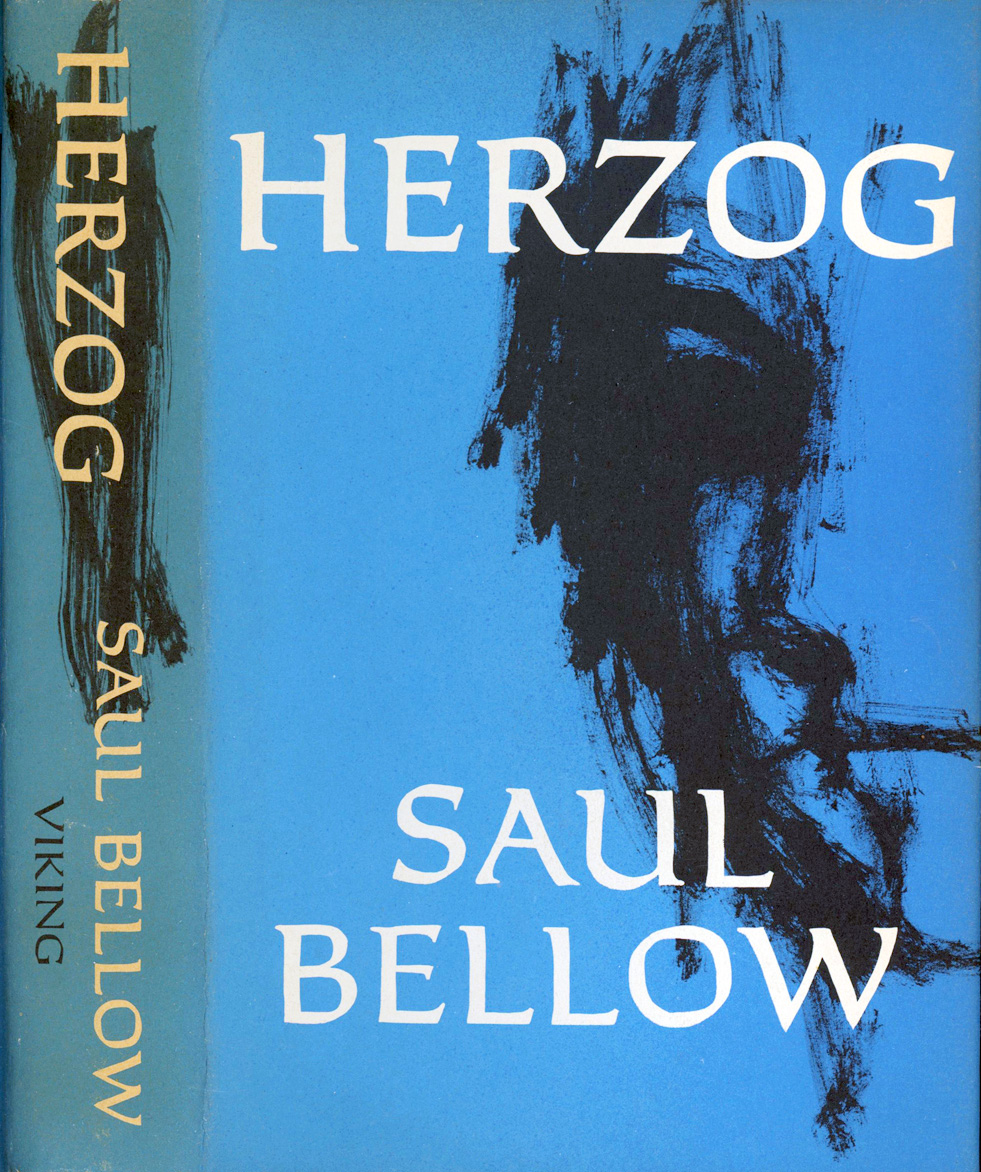
- First edition
- Author: Saul Bellow
- Cover artist: Mel Williamson
- Language: English
- Publisher: Viking Press
- Publication date: September 21, 1964
- Publication place: United States
- Media type: Print
- Pages: 341
- ISBN: 978-0142437292
- OCLC: 279707
- Dewey Decimal: 813.54

Herzog is a 1964 novel by Saul Bellow, composed in part of letters from the protagonist Moses E. Herzog. It won the U.S. National Book Award for Fiction and the Prix International. In 2005, Time magazine named it one of the 100 best novels in the English language since Time's founding in 1923.

== Plot summary ==
The novel follows five days in the life of cultural history professor Moses E. Herzog who, at age 47, is having a midlife crisis and burnout following the divorce from his second unfaithful wife. He has two children, one by each wife, and is in a relationship with a vibrant woman, Ramona, but is getting cold feet and running away from the commitment.

Herzog spends much of his time both on intense, and often hilarious, intellectual reflection and mentally writing letters he never sends. These letters are aimed at friends, family members, and famous figures, including historical recipients who are dead or whom he never knew. The one common thread is that Herzog is always expressing disappointment, either his own in the failings of others or their words, or apologizing for the way he has disappointed others.

Herzog's second wife, Madeleine, has recently left him for Valentine Gersbach, whom Herzog considered a close friend and had helped in many ways. While still married, Madeleine convinced Herzog to move her and their daughter June to Chicago and to arrange for Gersbach and his wife Phoebe to move as well. The plans were a ruse. Shortly after arriving in Chicago, Madeleine throws Herzog out and attempts to have him committed to an asylum.

The novel opens with Herzog in his house in Ludeyville, a fictional town in the Berkshires in western Massachusetts. He is contemplating returning to New York to see Ramona, but instead flees to Martha's Vineyard to visit some friends. He arrives at their house, but writes a note saying that he has to leave.

Herzog then heads to New York. After spending a night with Ramona, he heads to the courthouse to discuss the possibility of regaining custody of his daughter, June, with his lawyer. He subsequently witnesses a series of court hearings, including one in which a woman is charged with beating her three-year-old to death by flinging him against a wall.

Moses, already distraught after receiving a letter from June's babysitter about an traumatic incident in which Valentine locked June in the car while he and Madeleine argued inside the house, heads to Chicago. Moses goes to his stepmother's house and picks up his deceased father's antique pistol with two bullets in it, forming a vague plan to kill Madeleine and Valentine and run off with June.

The plan goes awry when Herzog sees Valentine giving June a bath and realizes that she is in no danger. The next day, after taking his daughter to the Museum of Science and the aquarium in Jackson Park, Herzog crashes his car and is charged with possession of a loaded weapon, the antique pistol. His brother, the rational Will, picks him up to try to help get him back on his feet.

Herzog heads to Ludeyville, where his brother meets him. The brother tries to convince Herzog to check himself into an institution, which he has considered but ultimately decides against. To Will's surprise, Ramona joins them for dinner, and Herzog begins making plans to fix up the house. The metaphor corresponds to his life, which needs repair but is still structurally sound. Herzog closes by saying that he needs to write no further letters.

In flashbacks throughout the novel, other critical details of Herzog's life come to light, including his first marriage to Daisy, their son Marco, the life of Herzog's father, and Herzog's sexual molestation by a stranger on a Chicago street.

== Style ==
"People don't realize how much they are in the grip of ideas", Bellow once wrote. "We live among ideas much more than we live in nature." Herzog is such a person. In fact, he considers his addiction to ideas to be his greatest virtue.

Herzog's ideas, as expressed in his letters, are brilliant and seductive; "After Herzog," the New York Times book reviewer exulted, "no writer need pretend in his fiction that his education stopped in the eighth grade." Bellow said in an interview, "Herzog comes to realize at last that what he considers his intellectual 'privilege' has proved to be another form of bondage." It is only when he has loosened this bondage and gotten in touch with the "primordial person" who exists outside this ideology that Herzog can "achieve the experience of authentic being."

The story is told entirely from Herzog's point of view, alternating between first-person and third-person. Of the protagonist's pervasive consciousness, Irving Howe wrote, "We are made captive in the world of Herzog ... the consciousness of the character forms the enclosing medium of the novel."

In typical Bellow style, the descriptions of characters' emotions and physical features are rich in wit and energy. Herzog's relationships are the central theme of the novel, not just with women and friends, but also society and himself. Herzog's own thoughts and thought processes are laid bare in the letters he writes.

As the novel progresses, the letters become fewer and fewer. This seems to mirror the healing of the narrator's mind, as his attention turns from his inner struggles, and the intellectual ideas that fascinate him, towards the real world outside and the real options offered by his current situation – not having to be a scholar, the possibility of starting afresh with Ramona, and so on.

== Autobiographical elements ==
In many ways, the character of Herzog echoes that of a fictionalized Saul Bellow. Both Herzog and Bellow grew up in Canada, the sons of bootleggers who had emigrated from Russia (St. Petersburg). Both are Jewish, lived in Chicago for significant periods of time, and were divorced twice (ultimately, Bellow would marry five times, divorcing four of his wives). Herzog is nearly the same age that Bellow was when he wrote the novel.

The character of Valentine Gersbach is based on Jack Ludwig, a long-time friend of Bellow, who had an affair with Bellow's second wife, Sondra. Similarly, Ramona is based on Rosette C. Lamont, a professor of French, whom Bellow dated after divorcing Sondra.

Both Lamont and Ludwig reviewed Herzog without mentioning the autobiographical elements, with the latter favorably describing it as "a major breakthrough."

Asked about these similarities, Bellow said, "I don't know that that sort of thing is really relevant. I mean, it's a curiosity about reality, which is impure; let's put it that way. Let's both be bigger than that."
