= Saul Bellow =

American writer (1915–2005)

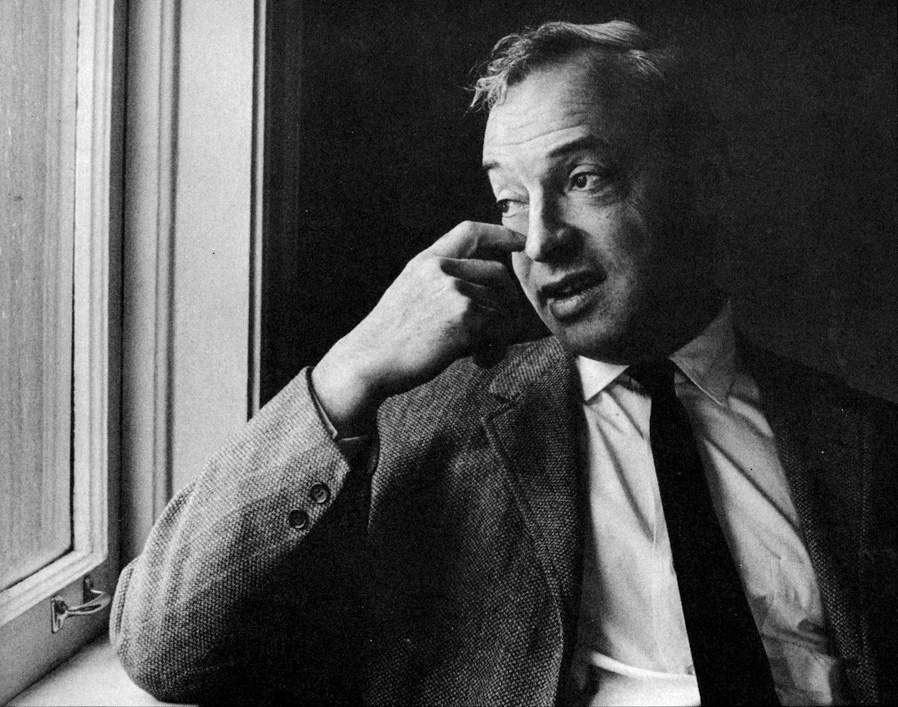
- Photo portrait of Bellow from the dust jacket of Herzog (1964)
- Born: Solomon Bellows; June 10, 1915; Lachine, Quebec, Canada
- Died: April 5, 2005 (aged 89); Brookline, Massachusetts, U.S.
- Citizenship: United States; Canada
- Education: University of Chicago; Northwestern University (BA); University of Wisconsin
- Occupation: Writer
- Spouses: Anita Goshkin (m. 1937; div. 1956) Alexandra (Sondra) Tschacbasov (m. 1956; div. 1959) Susan Glassman (m. 1961; div. 1964) Alexandra Ionescu Tulcea (m. 1974; div. 1985) Janis Freedman (m. 1989)
- Children: 4, including Adam Bellow
- Writing career
- Notable works: The Adventures of Augie March (1953); Henderson the Rain King (1959); Herzog (1964); Humboldt's Gift (1975)
- Notable awards: National Book Award (1954, 1965, 1971); Nobel Prize in Literature (1976); Pulitzer Prize for Fiction (1976); National Medal of Arts (1988)

Saul Bellow (born Solomon Bellows; June 10, 1915 – April 5, 2005) was a Canadian and American writer. For his literary work, Bellow was awarded the Pulitzer Prize, the 1976 Nobel Prize in Literature, and the National Medal of Arts. He is the only writer to win the National Book Award for Fiction three times, and he received the National Book Foundation's lifetime Medal for Distinguished Contribution to American Letters in 1990.

In the words of the Swedish Nobel Committee, his writing exhibited "the mixture of rich picaresque novel and subtle analysis of our culture, of entertaining adventure, drastic and tragic episodes in quick succession interspersed with philosophic conversation, all developed by a commentator with a witty tongue and penetrating insight into the outer and inner complications that drive us to act, or prevent us from acting, and that can be called the dilemma of our age." His best-known works include The Adventures of Augie March, Henderson the Rain King, Herzog, Mr. Sammler's Planet, Seize the Day, Humboldt's Gift, and Ravelstein.

Bellow said that of all his characters, Eugene Henderson, of Henderson the Rain King, was the one most like himself. Bellow grew up as an immigrant from Quebec. As Christopher Hitchens describes it, Bellow's fiction and principal characters reflect his own yearning for transcendence, a battle "to overcome not just ghetto conditions but also ghetto psychoses." Bellow's protagonists wrestle with what Albert Corde, the dean in The Dean's December, called "the big-scale insanities of the 20th century." This transcendence of the "unutterably dismal" (a phrase from Dangling Man) is achieved, if it can be achieved at all, through a "ferocious assimilation of learning" (Hitchens) and an emphasis on nobility.

== Biography ==
=== Early life ===
Saul Bellow was born Solomon Bellows in Lachine, Quebec, two years after his parents, Lescha (née Gordin) and Abraham Bellows (né Belo), emigrated from Saint Petersburg, Russia. He had three elder siblings: sister Zelda (later Jane, born in 1907), brothers Moishe (later Maurice, born in 1908) and Schmuel (later Samuel, born in 1911). Bellow's family was Lithuanian-Jewish; his father was born in Druya, a shtetl in the Pale of Settlement. Bellow celebrated his birthday on June 10, although he appears to have been born on July 10, according to records from the Jewish Genealogical Society-Montreal. (In the Jewish community, it was customary to record the Hebrew date of birth, which does not always coincide with the Gregorian calendar.) Of his family's emigration, Bellow wrote:

The retrospective was strong in me because of my parents. They were both full of the notion that they were falling, falling. They had been prosperous cosmopolitans in Saint Petersburg. My mother could never stop talking about the family dacha, her privileged life, and how all that was now gone. She was working in the kitchen. Cooking, washing, mending ... There had been servants in Russia ... But you could always transpose from your humiliating condition with the help of a sort of embittered irony.

A period of illness from a respiratory infection at age eight both taught him self-reliance (he was a very fit man despite his sedentary occupation) and provided an opportunity to satisfy his hunger for reading: reportedly, he decided to be a writer when he first read Harriet Beecher Stowe's Uncle Tom's Cabin.

When Bellow was nine, his family moved to the Humboldt Park neighborhood on the West Side of Chicago, the city that formed the backdrop of many of his novels. Bellow's father, Abraham, had become an onion importer. He also worked in a bakery, as a coal delivery man, and as a bootlegger. Bellow's mother, Liza, died when he was 17. She had been deeply religious and wanted her youngest son, Saul, to become a rabbi or a concert violinist. But he rebelled against what he later called the "suffocating orthodoxy" of his religious upbringing, and he began writing at a young age. Bellow's lifelong love for the Torah began at four when he learned Hebrew. Bellow also grew up reading Shakespeare and the great Russian novelists of the 19th century.

In Chicago, he took part in anthroposophical studies at the Anthroposophical Society of Chicago. Bellow attended Tuley High School on Chicago's west side where he befriended Yetta Barsh and Isaac Rosenfeld. In his 1959 novel Henderson the Rain King, Bellow modeled the character King Dahfu on Rosenfeld.

=== Education and early career ===
Bellow attended the University of Chicago but later transferred to Northwestern University. He originally wanted to study literature, but he felt the English department was anti-Jewish. Instead, he graduated with honors in anthropology and sociology. It has been suggested Bellow's study of anthropology had an influence on his literary style, and anthropological references pepper his works. He later did graduate work at the University of Wisconsin.

Paraphrasing Bellow's description of his close friend Allan Bloom (see Ravelstein), John Podhoretz has said that both Bellow and Bloom "inhaled books and ideas the way the rest of us breathe air."

In the 1930s, Bellow was part of the Chicago branch of the Federal Writers' Project, which included such future Chicago literary luminaries as Richard Wright and Nelson Algren. Many of the writers were radical: if they were not members of the Communist Party USA, they were sympathetic to the cause. Bellow was a Trotskyist, but because of the greater numbers of Stalinist-leaning writers, he had to suffer their taunts.

In 1941, Bellow became a naturalized United States citizen, after discovering, on attempting to enlist in the armed forces, that he had immigrated to the United States illegally as a child. In 1943, Maxim Lieber was his literary agent.

During World War II, Bellow joined the merchant marine and during his service he completed his first novel, Dangling Man (1944) about a young Chicago man waiting to be drafted for the war.

From 1946 through 1948 Bellow taught at the University of Minnesota. In the fall of 1947, following a tour to promote his novel The Victim, he moved into a large old house at 58 Orlin Avenue SE in the Prospect Park neighborhood of Minneapolis.

In 1948, Bellow was awarded a Guggenheim Fellowship that allowed him to move to Paris, where he began writing The Adventures of Augie March (1953). Critics have remarked on the resemblance between Bellow's picaresque novel and the great 17th-century Spanish classic Don Quixote. The book starts with one of American literature's most famous opening paragraphs, and it follows its titular character through a series of careers and encounters, as he lives by his wits and his resolve. Written in a colloquial yet philosophical style, The Adventures of Augie March established Bellow's reputation as a major author.

In 1953, Bellow translated Gimpel the Fool by Isaac Bashevis Singer from Yiddish into English.

In 1958, Bellow once again taught at the University of Minnesota. During this time, he and his wife Sasha received psychoanalysis from University of Minnesota Psychology Professor Paul Meehl.

In the spring term of 1961 he taught creative writing at the University of Puerto Rico at Río Piedras. One of his students was William Kennedy, who was encouraged by Bellow to write fiction.

=== Return to Chicago and mid-career ===
Bellow lived in New York City for years, but returned to Chicago in 1962 as a professor at the Committee on Social Thought at the University of Chicago. The committee's goal was to have professors work closely with talented graduate students on a multi-disciplinary approach to learning. His students included the poet Tom Mandel. Bellow taught on the committee for more than 30 years, alongside his close friend, the philosopher Allan Bloom.

There were also other reasons for Bellow's return to Chicago, where he moved into the Hyde Park neighborhood with his third wife, Susan Glassman. Bellow found Chicago vulgar but vital, and more representative of America than New York. He was able to stay in contact with old high school friends and a broad cross-section of society. In a 1982 profile, Bellow's neighborhood was described as a high-crime area in the city's center, and Bellow maintained he had to live in such a place as a writer and "stick to his guns."

Bellow hit the bestseller list in 1964 with his novel Herzog. Bellow was surprised at the commercial success of this cerebral novel about a middle-aged and troubled college professor who writes letters to friends, scholars and the dead, but never sends them. Bellow returned to his exploration of mental instability, and its relationship to genius, in his 1975 novel Humboldt's Gift. Bellow used his late friend and rival, the brilliant but self-destructive poet Delmore Schwartz, as his model for the novel's title character, Von Humboldt Fleisher. Bellow also used Rudolf Steiner's spiritual science, anthroposophy, as a theme in the book, having attended a study group in Chicago. He was elected a Fellow of the American Academy of Arts and Sciences in 1969.

=== Nobel Prize and later career ===
Propelled by the success of Humboldt's Gift, Bellow was awarded the Nobel Prize in literature in 1976. In the 70-minute address he gave to an audience in Stockholm, Sweden, Bellow called on writers to be beacons for civilization and awaken it from intellectual torpor.

The following year, the National Endowment for the Humanities selected Bellow for the Jefferson Lecture, the US federal government's highest honor for achievement in the humanities. Bellow's lecture was entitled "The Writer and His Country Look Each Other Over."

From December 1981 to March 1982, Bellow was the Visiting Lansdowne Scholar at the University of Victoria (BC), and also held the title Writer-in-Residence. In 1998, he was elected to the American Philosophical Society.

Bellow traveled widely throughout his life, mainly to Europe, which he sometimes visited twice a year. As a young man, Bellow went to Mexico City to meet Leon Trotsky, but the expatriate Russian revolutionary was assassinated the day before they were to meet. Bellow's social contacts were wide and varied. He tagged along with Robert F. Kennedy for a magazine profile he never wrote, and was close friends with the author Ralph Ellison. His many friends included the journalist Sydney J. Harris and the poet John Berryman.

While sales of Bellow's first few novels were modest, that turned around with Herzog. Bellow continued teaching well into his old age, enjoying its human interaction and exchange of ideas. He taught at Yale University, University of Minnesota, New York University, Princeton University, University of Puerto Rico, University of Chicago, Bard College and Boston University, where he co-taught a class with James Wood ('modestly absenting himself' when it was time to discuss Seize the Day). In order to take up his appointment at Boston, Bellow moved from Chicago to Brookline, Massachusetts, in 1993; he died there on April 5, 2005, at age 89. He is buried at the Jewish cemetery Shir HeHarim of Brattleboro, Vermont.

While he read voluminously, Bellow also played the violin and followed sports. Work was a constant for him, but he at times toiled at a plodding pace on his novels, frustrating the publishing company.

His early works earned him the reputation as a major novelist of the 20th century, and by his death he was widely regarded as one of the greatest living novelists. He was the first writer to win three National Book Awards in all award categories. His friend and protege Philip Roth has said of him, "The backbone of 20th-century American literature has been provided by two novelists—William Faulkner and Saul Bellow. Together they are the Melville, Hawthorne, and Twain of the 20th century." James Wood, in a eulogy of Bellow in The New Republic, wrote:

I judged all modern prose by his. Unfair, certainly, because he made even the fleet-footed—the Updikes, the DeLillos, the Roths—seem like monopodes. Yet what else could I do? I discovered Saul Bellow's prose in my late teens, and henceforth, the relationship had the quality of a love affair about which one could not keep silent. Over the last week, much has been said about Bellow's prose, and most of the praise—perhaps because it has been overwhelmingly by men—has tended toward the robust: We hear about Bellow's mixing of high and low registers, his Melvillean cadences jostling the jivey Yiddish rhythms, the great teeming democracy of the big novels, the crooks and frauds and intellectuals who loudly people the brilliant sensorium of the fiction. All of this is true enough; John Cheever, in his journals, lamented that, alongside Bellow's fiction, his stories seemed like mere suburban splinters. Ian McEwan wisely suggested last week that British writers and critics may have been attracted to Bellow precisely because he kept alive a Dickensian amplitude now lacking in the English novel. ... But nobody mentioned the beauty of this writing, its music, its high lyricism, its firm but luxurious pleasure in language itself. ... [I]n truth, I could not thank him enough when he was alive, and I cannot now.

== Personal life ==
Bellow was married five times, with all but his last marriage ending in divorce. Bellow's wives were Anita Goshkin, Alexandra (Sondra) Tschacbasov (daughter of painter Nahum Tschacbasov), Susan Glassman, Alexandra Ionescu Tulcea, and Janis Freedman.

His son Greg by his first marriage became a psychotherapist; he published Saul Bellow's Heart: A Son's Memoir in 2013, nearly a decade after his father's death. Bellow's son by his second marriage, Adam, published a nonfiction book In Praise of Nepotism in 2003. Bellow's son by his third marriage, Daniel, is a potter, a writer and a former journalist. In 1999, when he was 84, Bellow had his fourth child and first daughter, with Freedman.

He was a patron of Woodlawn Tap, a Hyde Park tavern popular among writers and academics.

== Themes and style ==
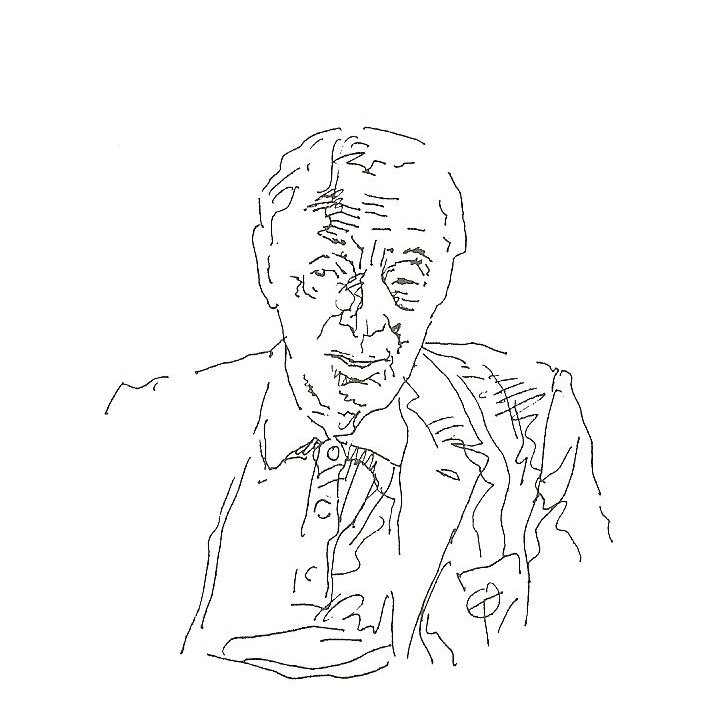
Portrait of Bellow by Zoran Tucić

Bellow's themes include the disorientation of contemporary society, and the ability of people to overcome their frailty and achieve greatness or awareness. Bellow saw many flaws in modern civilization, and its ability to foster madness, materialism and misleading knowledge. Principal characters in Bellow's fiction have heroic potential, and many times they stand in contrast to the negative forces of society. Often these characters are Jewish and have a sense of alienation or otherness.

Jewish life and identity is a major theme in Bellow's work, although he bristled at being called a "Jewish writer". Bellow's work also shows a great appreciation of America, and a fascination with the uniqueness and vibrancy of the American experience.

Bellow's work abounds in references and quotes from Marcel Proust and Henry James, among others, but he offsets these high-culture references with jokes. Bellow interspersed autobiographical elements into his fiction, and many of his principal characters were said to bear a resemblance to him.

== Assessment ==
Martin Amis described Bellow as "The greatest American author ever, in my view".

His sentences seem to weigh more than anyone else's. He is like a force of nature ... He breaks all the rules ... [T]he people in Bellow's fiction are real people, yet the intensity of the gaze that he bathes them in, somehow through the particular, opens up into the universal.

For Linda Grant, "What Bellow had to tell us in his fiction was that it was worth it, being alive."

His vigour, vitality, humour and passion were always matched by the insistence on thought, not the predigested cliches of the mass media or of those on the left, which had begun to disgust him by the Sixties ... It's easy to be a 'writer of conscience'—anyone can do it if they want to; just choose your cause. Bellow was a writer about conscience and consciousness, forever conflicted by the competing demands of the great cities, the individual's urge to survival against all odds and his equal need for love and some kind of penetrating understanding of what there was of significance beyond all the racket and racketeering.

On the other hand, Bellow's detractors considered his work conventional and old-fashioned, as if the author were trying to revive the 19th-century European novel. In a private letter, Vladimir Nabokov described Bellow as a "miserable mediocrity". Journalist and author Ron Rosenbaum described Bellow's Ravelstein (2000) as the only book that rose above Bellow's failings as an author. Rosenbaum wrote,

My problem with the pre-Ravelstein Bellow is that he all too often strains too hard to yoke together two somewhat contradictory aspects of his being and style. There's the street-wise Windy City wiseguy and then—as if to show off that the wiseguy has Wisdom—there are the undigested chunks of arcane, not entirely impressive, philosophic thought and speculation. Just to make sure you know his novels have intellectual heft. That the world and the flesh in his prose are both figured and transfigured.

Kingsley Amis, father of Martin Amis, was less impressed by Bellow. In 1971, Kingsley suggested that crime writer John D. MacDonald "is by any standards a better writer than Saul Bellow".

Sam Tanenhaus wrote in The New York Times Book Review in 2007:

But what, then, of the many defects—the longueurs and digressions, the lectures on anthroposophy and religion, the arcane reading lists? What of the characters who don't change or grow but simply bristle onto the page, even the colorful lowlifes pontificating like fevered students in the seminars Bellow taught at the University of Chicago? And what of the punitively caricatured ex-wives drawn from the teeming annals of the novelist's own marital discord?

But Tanenhaus went on to answer his question:

Shortcomings, to be sure. But so what? Nature doesn't owe us perfection. Novelists don't either. Who among us would even recognize perfection if we saw it? In any event, applying critical methods, of whatever sort, seemed futile in the case of an author who, as Randall Jarrell once wrote of Walt Whitman, 'is a world, a waste with, here and there, systems blazing at random out of the darkness'—those systems 'as beautifully and astonishingly organized as the rings and satellites of Saturn.'

V. S. Pritchett praised Bellow, finding his shorter works to be his best. Pritchett called Bellow's novella Seize the Day a "small gray masterpiece."

== Political views ==
As he grew older, Bellow moved away from leftwing politics and became identified with cultural conservatism. Bellow was momentarily caught up in the contentious realm of African American–Jewish relations. According to Alfred Kazin Bellow once said: "Who is the Tolstoy of the Zulus? The Proust of the Papuans? I'd be glad to read him." Bellow distanced himself somewhat from these remarks, which he characterized as "off the cuff obviously and pedantic certainly" but nevertheless the "scandal is entirely journalistic in origin." He affirmed, however, his stance against political correctness, writing:

In any reasonably open society, the absurdity of a petty thought-police campaign provoked by the inane magnification of "discriminatory" remarks about the Papuans and the Zulus would be laughed at. To be serious in this fanatical style is a sort of Stalinism – the Stalinist seriousness and fidelity to the party line that senior citizens like me remember all too well. ... Rage is now brilliantly prestigious. Rage, the reverse of bourgeois prudence, is a luxury. Rage is distinguished, it is a patrician passion. The rage of rappers and rioters takes as its premise the majority's admission of guilt for past and present injustices, and counts on the admiration of the repressed for the emotional power of the uninhibited and "justly" angry. Rage can also be manipulative; it can be an instrument of censorship and despotism.

Despite his identification with Chicago, he kept aloof from some of that city's more conventional writers. In a 2006 interview with Stop Smiling magazine, Studs Terkel said of Bellow: "I didn't know him too well. We disagreed on a number of things politically. In the protests in the beginning of Norman Mailer's Armies of the Night, when Mailer, Robert Lowell and Paul Goodman were marching to protest the Vietnam War, Bellow was invited to a sort of counter-gathering. He said, 'Of course I'll attend'. But he made a big thing of it. Instead of just saying OK, he was proud of it. So I wrote him a letter and he didn't like it. He wrote me a letter back. He called me a Stalinist. But otherwise, we were friendly. He was a brilliant writer, of course. I love Seize the Day."

Attempts to name a street after Bellow in his Hyde Park neighborhood were halted by a local alderman, Toni Preckwinkle, on the grounds that Bellow had made remarks about the neighborhood's inhabitants that they considered racist. A one-block stretch of West Augusta Boulevard in Humboldt Park was named Saul Bellow Way in his honor instead.

Bellow was a supporter of U.S. English, an organization formed in the early 1980s by John Tanton and former Senator S. I. Hayakawa, that supports making English the official language of the United States, but ended his association with the group in 1988.

== Awards and honors ==
- 1948 Guggenheim Fellowship
- 1954 National Book Award for Fiction
- 1965 National Book Award for Fiction
- 1971 National Book Award for Fiction
- 1976 Pulitzer Prize for Fiction
- 1976 Nobel Prize in Literature
- 1980 O. Henry Award
- 1986 St. Louis Literary Award from the Saint Louis University Library Associates
- 1988 National Medal of Arts
- 1989 PEN/Malamud Award
- 1989 Peggy V. Helmerich Distinguished Author Award
- 1990 National Book Foundation's lifetime Medal for Distinguished Contribution to American Letters
- 1997 National Jewish Book Award for The Actual
- 2010 Inducted into the Chicago Literary Hall of Fame.
- 2024 United States Postal Service issued a three-ounce stamp commemorating Saul Bellow on February 6, 2024, in Chicago. The stamp features a portrait illustration by Joe Ciardiello.

Bellow is represented in the collection of the National Portrait Gallery with six portraits, including a photograph by Irving Penn, a painting by Sarah Yuster, a bust by Sara Miller, and drawings by Edward Sorel and Arthur Herschel Lidov. A copy of the Miller bust was installed at the Harold Washington Library Center in 1993. Bellow's papers are held at the library of the University of Chicago.

Other than the stretch of West Augusta Boulevard in Humboldt Park, Chicago, there is a library in the borough of Lachine, Montreal named after Saul Bellow.

== Bibliography ==
=== Novels and novellas ===
- Dangling Man (1944)
- The Victim (1947)
- The Adventures of Augie March (1953), National Book Award for Fiction
- Seize the Day (1956)
- Henderson the Rain King (1959)
- Herzog (1964), National Book Award
- Mr. Sammler's Planet (1970), National Book Award
- Humboldt's Gift (1975), winner of the 1976 Pulitzer Prize for Fiction
- The Dean's December (1982)
- More Die of Heartbreak (1987)
- A Theft (1989)
- The Bellarosa Connection (1989)
- The Actual (1997)
- Ravelstein (2000)

=== Short story collections ===
- Mosby's Memoirs and Other Stories (1968)
- Him with His Foot in His Mouth and Other Stories (1984)
- Something to Remember Me By: Three Tales (1991)
- Collected Stories (2001)

=== Plays ===
- The Last Analysis (1965)

=== Library of America editions ===
- Novels 1944–1953: Dangling Man, The Victim, The Adventures of Augie March (2003)
- Novels 1956–1964: Seize the Day, Henderson the Rain King, Herzog (2007)
- Novels 1970–1982: Mr. Sammler's Planet, Humboldt's Gift, The Dean's December (2010)
- Novels 1984–2000: What Kind of Day Did You Have?, More Die of Heartbreak, A Theft, The Bellarosa Connection, The Actual, Ravelstein (2014)

=== Translations ===
- "Gimpel the Fool"' (1945), short story by Isaac Bashevis Singer (translated by Bellow in 1953)

=== Non-fiction ===
- To Jerusalem and Back (1976), memoir
- It All Adds Up (1994), essay collection
- Saul Bellow: Letters, edited by Benjamin Taylor (2010), correspondence
- There Is Simply Too Much To Think About (Viking, 2015), collection of shorter non-fiction pieces

== See also ==
- List of Jewish Nobel laureates
- PEN/Saul Bellow Award for Achievement in American Fiction
- List of oldest fathers
