= The Rector of Justin =

1964 novel by Louis Auchincloss

- Cover of the 1964 first edition
- Author: Louis Auchincloss
- Language: English
- Genre: Psychological fiction
- Publisher: Houghton Mifflin
- Publication date: 1964
- ISBN: 978-0-618-22489-0

The Rector of Justin is a 1964 psychological fiction novel by Louis Auchincloss about the headmaster (or "rector") of a socially exclusive American boarding school. Over the decades, various narrators provide contrasting perspectives on rector Francis Prescott's charismatic personality and autocratic leadership style. Through the narrators' disagreements, the novel gradually unveils that White Anglo-Saxon Protestant society—of which Prescott is a reluctant mascot—has lost its innocence and abandoned its Christian values.

The novel was a commercial hit and was warmly received by most contemporary critics. It was a finalist for the Pulitzer Prize for Fiction and the National Book Award for Fiction, losing to Shirley Ann Grau's The Keeper of the House and Saul Bellow's Herzog, respectively. Its loss to Herzog marked American literary fiction's transition from realist society novels about the American upper class to poetic prose, avant-garde style, and culturally diverse protagonists.

Upon its release, Harper's Magazine called the book "almost certainly the finest work ever written about an American preparatory school". It is often considered Auchincloss' greatest novel.

== Synopsis ==
The story is told through six narrators: frame narrator Brian Aspinwall, a teacher at Massachusetts Episcopal boarding school Justin Martyr ("Justin" for short; named for the Christian figure), who is asked to write a biography of its founder Francis Prescott; and writings and interviews from five people who knew him.

=== Brian Aspinwall ===
In 1939, Aspinwall begins teaching English at Justin. Prescott's contradictions fascinate him. Prescott is an intellectual, but Justin is laddish and focused on sports. Prescott's oldest friend Horace Havistock is gay, but Justin is institutionally homophobic. The school claims to be more democratic than its peers, but its students are generally rich. After the Fall of France, Havistock persuades Prescott to retire, arguing that their shared world is dying.

=== Horace Havistock ===
Havistock and Prescott went to boarding school together. (Note: The school in question borrows several details from St. Paul's School, which was also located in New Hampshire and also had a strongly Episcopalian headmaster who looked down on other Christian denominations. In the novel, the headmaster warns students that "Unitarians or Baptists ... would occupy a lower social level in the hereafter". At St. Paul's, the equivalent dictum was that "in the life to come Presbyterians will not be on the same plane as Episcopalians".) A Civil War orphan whose family was respectable but not especially wealthy, Prescott resents rich boys like Havistock, who become targets for his cruel wit. Even so, Havistock befriends him. Prescott dreams of building a different kind of boarding school, focused on religious and civic virtue. He has a crisis of faith at Oxford, but reconverts to Christianity after experiencing a vision of his dead father. Havistock persuades his friend Eliza to break off her engagement with the re-energized Prescott, who will always put his career over his relationships.

=== David Griscam ===
The chairman of the Justin board, white-shoe lawyer David Griscam, both idolizes and dislikes Prescott. He appreciated Justin's family atmosphere, but admits that Justin's bullying and code of silence taught him to be "underhanded". Neither Griscam nor his wife share Prescott's Episcopal faith: Griscam is agnostic, while his wife, an evangelical Christian, resents Justin's religious elitism. Griscam insists on sending his two sons to Justin anyway, but neither succeeds there.

Appealing to Prescott's ambition, Griscam encourages Prescott to solicit donations from men whose wealth he resents. Prescott wants to expel a donor's son for academic dishonesty, but Max Totten, a cynical scholarship student, agrees to take the blame in exchange for a job at the donor's company. Although Max is expelled, he eventually takes over the family business and becomes one of Griscam's "most valued clients", while the son falls into alcoholism.

=== Cordelia Prescott Turnbull ===
Prescott's daughter Cordelia claims that Prescott started a boys' school due to his own repressed homosexual tendencies. She marries a Catholic to annoy him, but after Prescott gives his approval, she leaves her husband and moves to Paris, where she and her lover Charley Strong (a Justinian who loses his Christian faith in World War I) become part of the Lost Generation of American expatriates. Her mother visits her in Paris and reveals a deep intelligence that was repressed at Justin. Before Strong's death, Prescott reconverts him to Christianity, infuriating Cordelia. She returns to America and marries vulgar businessman Guy Turnbull, but surprisingly, Turnbull befriends Prescott, who craves his respect as a businessman and is impressed by his shameless materialism. Cordelia divorces Turnbull. Prescott confides to Aspinwall that while he has loved his daughters inadequately, he has shown them devotion.

=== Charley Strong ===
In the last surviving chapter of a manuscript that Strong burned before his death, Strong recounts his hero worship of Prescott, which may be rooted in Prescott forgiving him for an early sexual indiscretion. He sees Prescott's Christian discipline as an alternative to the rootlessness of the Lost Generation.

=== Jules Griscam ===
In a memoir written before his death, David Griscam's son Jules implies that his father sent him to Justin because David worried that his materialism would spoil his children. Jules is a poor fit for Justin and Prescott eventually expels him for lying, but David gets Jules into Harvard anyway. Jules concludes that "an act of desecration" is the only real way to get back at Prescott. He vandalizes several school relics and is arrested. (Note: This sequence was based on a real-life incident from 1930, when Auchincloss was a young student at Groton School. Two Groton alumni got drunk while visiting their alma mater and vandalized various places on campus. The school's headmaster, Endicott Peabody, declined to press charges. Several years after the event, he helped officiate the wedding of one of the men responsible.) When Prescott visits him in jail, Jules claims that Prescott uses religion to aggrandize himself, which wounds Prescott deeply. Jules drunkenly commits suicide, taking his lover with him.

=== Brian Aspinwall ===
After Prescott's successor softens religious discipline and accommodates practicing Catholics, (Note: Prescott admits that his policy of forcing students to attend Protestant chapel services also deters Jews from attending the school, but actually praises Jews for refusing to accede to his demands. Auchincloss wrote that the real-life Endicott Peabody was neither "a snob" nor "intolerant of other faiths", but sincerely believed that "a Protestant Episcopal Church School naturally excluded other faiths.") Prescott plots to oust him. Aspinwall dislikes David Griscam's combination of materialism and tightfistedness, but tips him off anyway. Griscam persuades Prescott to relent by introducing him to elitist and racist dissidents on the Justin board, showing that his successor is the lesser of two evils. Prescott bitterly remarks that Justin is no different from any other prep school. He dies of cancer eight months later. Aspinwall resolves to finish his Prescott biography, although he implies that to preserve the idealized memory of Prescott, it will be "in some part [a] work[] of fiction".

== Development ==
=== Concept ===
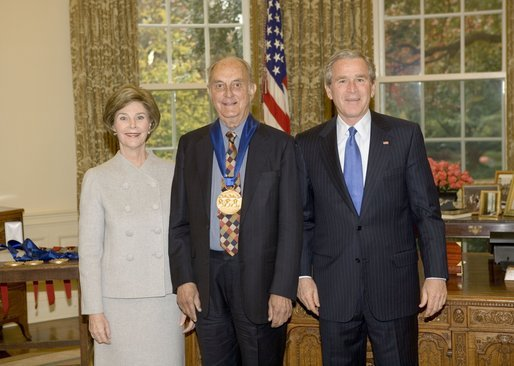
Author Louis Auchincloss (center) received the National Medal of Arts in 2005. He stands between President George W. Bush and First Lady Laura Bush.

Louis Auchincloss was sent to his father's boarding school, Groton, and graduated in 1935. Although he later delivered the school's centennial address, he maintained a lifelong ambivalence for the institution, explaining that his first two years of prep school were a "festering misery" and that he was "at first abysmally wretched and later moderately content". He got the idea for The Rector of Justin from his high school English teacher, Malcolm Strachan, whose wife was the publisher of the Atlantic Monthly. Strachan had become a close confidant of Groton's founder and longtime headmaster, Endicott Peabody, and planned to write a novel showing that Peabody's "theology was subtler and more complicated than any of us supposed." After Strachan's premature death, Auchincloss resolved to write the novel his way.

In 1960, Groton published a collection of essays from the school community to commemorate its 75th anniversary. In his essay, Auchincloss wrote that the alumni had many different impressions of their high school years, and speculated that the aging Peabody had been "troubled by the number of Grotons he seemed to have created and of how little any of them resembled his own." In addition, although published by the school, the essays voiced several criticisms of Groton. Ellery Sedgwick wrote that despite Groton's high-minded rhetoric, "evil and good have entered into Groton careers in a proportion astonishingly similar to their proportion in any community". George Biddle said that while seven of his classmates were listed in Who's Who, "nearly twice that number could, I suppose, be listed as absolute failures". Auchincloss later sent two of his three sons to Groton, although his biographer cautioned that, by that time, it was "a far more permissive place".

=== Timeline ===
Auchincloss had wanted to write a story about a boarding school headmaster for some time, although he was saving the idea "for [a] time when I should feel ready to handle it". In 1938, just three years after graduating from Groton, he drafted a novel in which a headmaster seeks to raise students "with the ideals of public service and a sense of noblesse oblige", but realizes that he has failed, as most of his students chase lucrative jobs on Wall Street.

Over time, Auchincloss decided that the story would need to cover a long span of time and that it would need to be either a biography or autobiography. He discarded the idea of an autobiography because a fictional Prescott would have trouble describing his effect on other people from his own perspective. In 1956, Auchincloss published a predecessor of the story in Harper's Magazine under the title "The Trial of Mr. M." The story details a retired boarding school headmaster who considers opposing his successor's reforms, but ultimately concedes that the school must adapt to the real world. Auchincloss recycles the imagery of the headmaster's lament—comparing himself to a vaudeville act in which a clown is "remorselessly" followed by a spotlight—for Prescott's final monologue in the novel.

In Auchincloss' first draft of the novel, David Griscam was the frame narrator instead of Brian Aspinwall, and the book emphasized the rivalry between Griscam and Prescott. He discarded the idea because Griscam's "personality got out of hand". He eventually came up with the idea of making the biographer a younger man who differed from Prescott in every way except their shared religious faith, which they both recognized was "almost totally lacking in the school, the faculty, the parents, and the trustees," who "care[d] only about the appearance of faith".

Late in his life, Auchincloss (who said that he had been sexually abused by another student in high school, without the school's knowledge) admitted that he had considered broaching the topic of sexual abuse in The Rector of Justin, but ultimately left it out. He felt that the literary mores of the day would not permit him to address the matter with sufficient candor. He subsequently touched upon this theme in The Scarlet Letters (2003) and The Headmaster's Dilemma (2007), as well as his 2010 autobiography.

Auchincloss submitted a draft of the novel to Houghton Mifflin in July 1963. It was published in July 1964.

=== Inspirations ===
==== The school ====
Auchincloss sought to build a composite narrative of the American boarding school between the Gilded Age and World War II, explaining that it was "the great era of headmasters". He reviewed a series of headmaster biographies from various schools, including Peabody's Groton, St. Paul's, St. Mark's, and Lawrenceville, but dismissed them as "a dreary lot". Nonetheless, the novel frequently draws from Auchincloss' experiences at Groton in the 1930s. One critic quipped that in one scene, "the Rev. Francis Prescott, founder and first headmaster of Justin Martyr, an Episcopal school 30 miles west of Boston, was speaking about the Rev. Endicott Peabody, founder and first headmaster of Groton School, an Episcopal-oriented school 30 miles west of Boston".

The novel mirrors some of the compromises Peabody made to build Groton. According to one story, in 1891, Peabody financed Groton's main dormitory by allowing donors who contributed at least $5,000 (approximately $175,000 in 2025 dollars) to nominate one student for admission, notwithstanding the waiting list. He later remarked that focusing on educating wealthy students was "one of the great mistakes that [he] made as Headmaster". For his own part, Auchincloss commented that Peabody had no other option, since "who else in 1881 was going to support a new school started by three young men?"

==== The rector ====
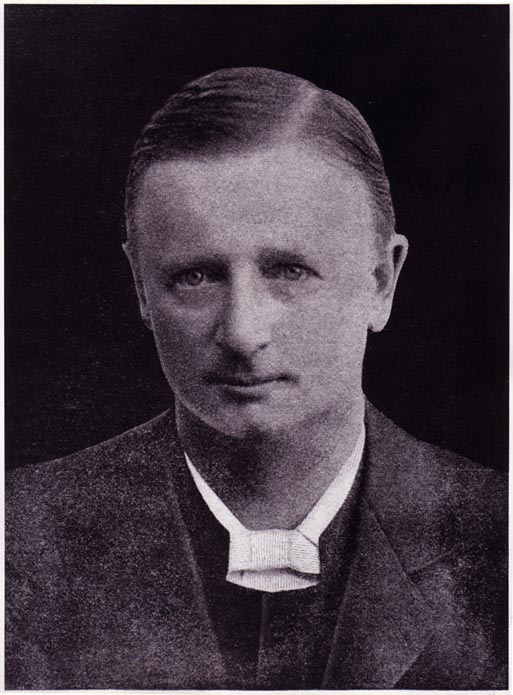
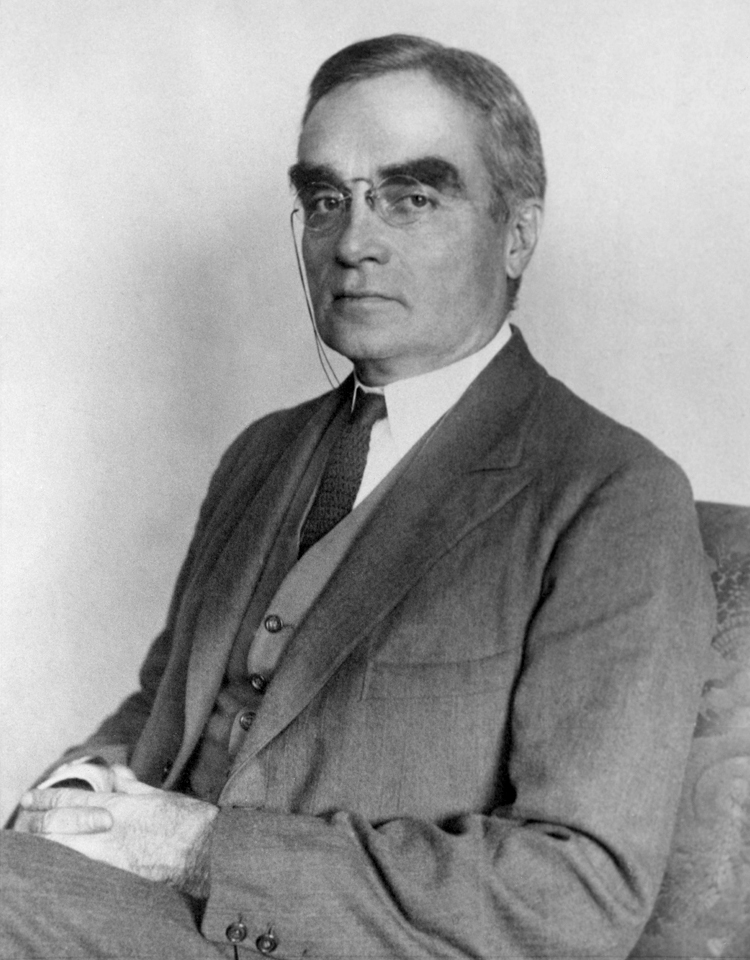
Auchincloss based Francis Prescott on schoolmaster Endicott Peabody (left) and judge Learned Hand.

The character of Frank Prescott was often compared to Endicott Peabody, although Auchincloss protested that the two men "shared not a single characteristic". He explained that Peabody was "simple, straightforward, literal, and always sincere", while Prescott was "complex, arrogant, witty, cynical, intellectual", and "a bit of a charlatan". He admitted that he had borrowed "certain facts and dates" from Peabody's life, but maintained that Prescott was based, at least "in part", on federal judge Learned Hand, who he described as "the greatest man whom I ever had the good luck to know". However, he later recalled that Archibald MacLeish was the only person who recognized Hand's influence on Prescott.

Even so, upon its publication, the book reportedly "caused uproar among Groton alumni who saw it as an attack" on Peabody. Peabody's granddaughter Marietta consoled Auchincloss by telling him that the criticism reflected how little his critics understood Peabody. In addition, Peabody's biographer Frank Ashburn commented that Frank Prescott "only remotely" resembled his subject, and Larissa MacFarquhar wrote that "Prescott is a far more convoluted and ambiguous character" than Peabody. One Groton graduate, Cass Canfield of the Harper and Row publishing house, publicly praised the book and Prescott's character in particular, but did not discuss the Peabody connection.

Prescott's title (and thus the title of the book) also refers to Peabody. While Groton did not use the term "rector" for its headmaster (the term was instead used by St. Paul's School), the school community informally referred to Endicott Peabody as "the Rector".

==== Other characters ====
The character of Brian Aspinwall is modeled on Auchincloss' old mentor, Malcolm Strachan. Auchincloss admitted that Aspinwall was "much weaker and less attractive ... than Malcolm had ever been", but rejected claims that the character was a veiled attack on Strachan. He said that he wanted to make Aspinwall as different from Prescott as possible for dramatic effect.

Auchincloss based Prescott's friend Horace Havistock on University of Cambridge legal historian G. T. Lapsley. Like Havistock, Lapsley was a gay man who left America for Europe.

== Themes ==
Auchincloss spent most of his career detailing the decline of White Anglo-Saxon Protestants' (WASPs) leading role in American society. (Note: Auchincloss personally disliked the term "WASP" and preferred the term "Protestant.") Shortly before his death, he explained that while most of his WASP friends were richer in the 21st century than they had been growing up, "everyone has moved up", and the old-money elite had "lost their monopoly." He added that "to have witnessed the disintegration of an economic ruling class in the 1930s from a front row seat ... was all a novelist could ask [for]." In an early chapter of The Rector of Justin, Horace Havistock concedes that "the world of the private school" is necessarily tied up with "the world of personal honor and a Protestant God", and that "when a civilization crumbles, it crumbles all together."

=== The collapse of aristocratic values ===
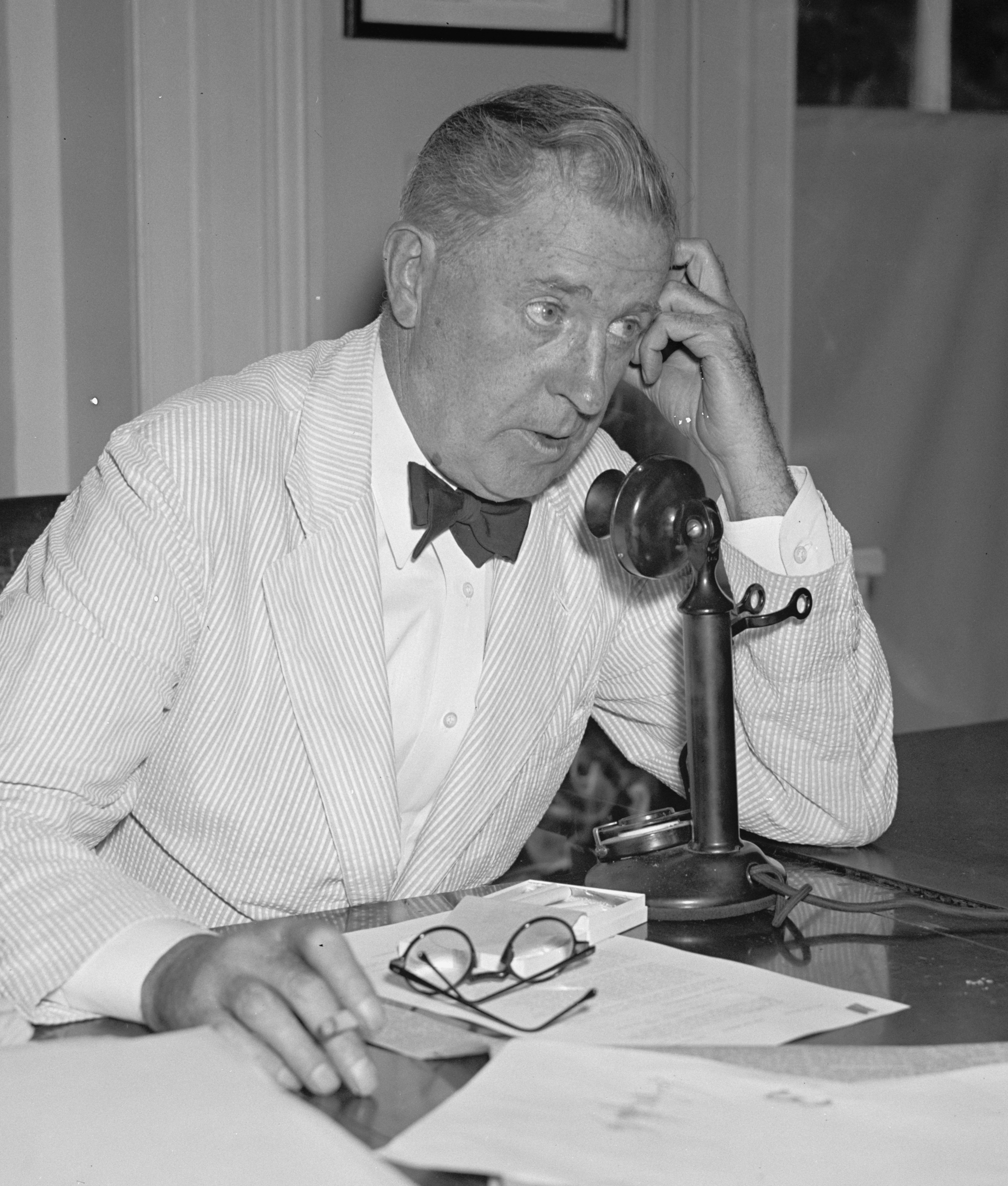
The public disgrace of Richard Whitney (pictured), the aristocratic president of the New York Stock Exchange, shocked upper-class society.

The Rector of Justin explores the erosion of the WASPs' self-belief that values instilled at schools like Groton entitled them to leadership roles in the corporate world and public service, and reflects Auchincloss' growing disillusionment with WASP society in the 1930s and 1940s. Auchincloss said that when he was growing up, the Eastern Establishment thought it "could be trusted to regulate itself". As an example of these values, the novel notes how after David Griscam's father went bankrupt and fled the country, his mother felt a "sacred duty" to pay off her absentee husband's debts, forcing the family to abandon its upper-class lifestyle. As a young man, Auchincloss resented the Groton-educated Franklin Delano Roosevelt's use of government to enforce morality in the corporate sphere, reasoning that it was a repudiation of Establishment values. However, he eventually lost faith in the idea that WASPs were more moral than the general population. Another Groton alumnus, financier Richard Whitney, shocked high society with his 1938 embezzlement conviction; Auchincloss explored Whitney's misdeeds in his next novel, The Embezzler (1966).

Pa and Mother, of course, were supreme at Justin, but from the beginning we knew that Justin was not the real world. ... [A]lthough [the real world] treated Pa and Mother with respect, it was the kind of respect that people might pay to the sovereigns of a small Pacific Island kingdom, more exotic than powerful, not quite to be taken seriously, perhaps even a bit ridiculous.

— Cordelia Prescott Turnbull, in The Rector of Justin (chapter 12)

Over the course of the novel, an increasingly immoral WASP establishment begins hiding behind moral individuals like Francis Prescott to obscure its own failures. Auchincloss wrote that the basic idea of the novel was "to study a saint and to leave it up to the reader whether saints are good or bad." By the end of the novel, Justinians have raised up an idealized version of Prescott to pretend that Christian values are still relevant to modern society, turning Prescott into "a symbol rather than a source of morality." Prescott's daughter Cordelia points out that the true elites have carefully sidelined her father, who was "not quite to be taken seriously".

Removing Prescott from the picture clarifies that while the American elite's "inviolable rules of conduct ... were once the glue that held together a stern, but deeply felt system of ethical values," by the 1940s they were "little more than useful justifications for preserving a selfish status quo." Auchincloss praised the writings of Oliver La Farge, another unhappy Groton alumnus, which taught him that "Groton without Peabody" is "just this 'dream', this stuffy little group of snooty, cruel boys".

Auchincloss' views evolved after the novel was published. After watching his high school classmates William and McGeorge Bundy lead America into the Vietnam War, he concluded that the novel's take on Groton ("that its graduates were ... too shallow to aspire to the school's ideals") was fundamentally incorrect. He decided that "the ideals themselves were rotten", explaining that Groton taught the Bundys to never concede defeat, even when the war could not be won. In The House of the Prophet (1980), the novel's stand-in for Walter Lippmann comments that the danger of Groton was in its culture of "pugnacity".

=== Elite decadence ===
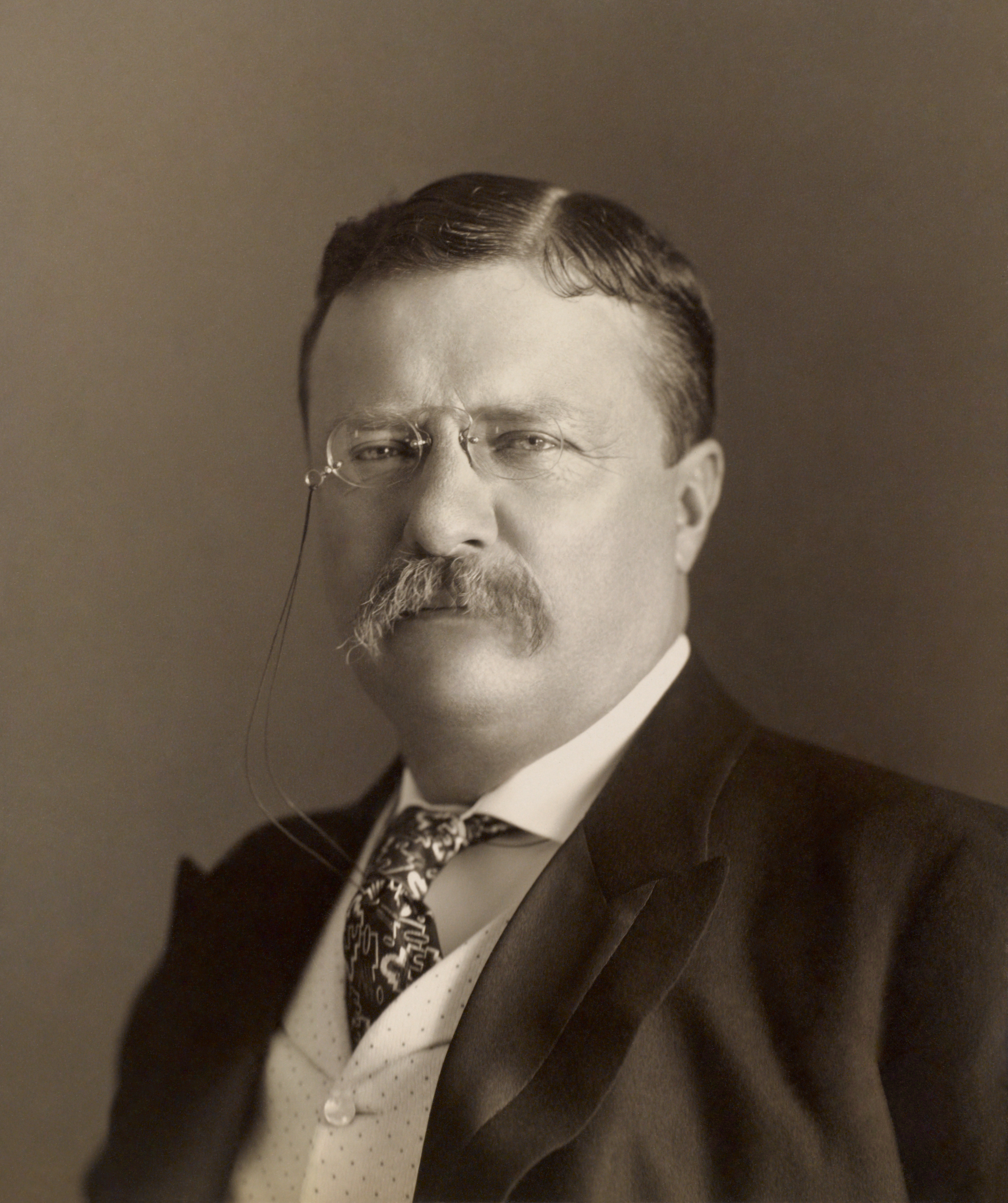
Endicott Peabody's friend Theodore Roosevelt supported Peabody's goal to toughen up the children of American elites, urging Peabody's students to avoid "the life of mere vapid ease." However, some students questioned whether Peabody had been successful.

The novel reflects Auchincloss' disillusionment with American boarding schools' inability to live up to their founders' vision. In a 1968 essay, (Note: Later reprinted as an afterword to the 2001 Modern Library edition of the novel.) Auchincloss explained that "the central problem in all New England Protestant church schools of [Peabody's] day was the conflict between the piety and idealism of their inspirers and the crass materialism of the families" that supported them. As Gore Vidal (Exeter '43) put it, Auchincloss' books frequently trace "the collapse of the Puritan ethical system and its replacement by—as far as those of us now living can tell—nothing."

Like Prescott, the real-life Endicott Peabody sought to toughen up spoiled aristocrats through harsh discipline and simple living. Auchincloss suggested that this mission was doomed to fail, recalling Peabody "as a David engaged in the seemingly hopeless struggle of preserving some degree of spirituality from the Goliath of materialism that re-invaded the school with each new form of prosperous youngsters." In the novel, Prescott contemptuously remarks that Peabody's Groton is "well equipped to train young men for the steam room of the Racquet Club". Only at the end of his life does Prescott realize that his school is no different. (Note: Nelson Aldrich (St. Paul's '53) quipped that while Groton boys dismissed St. Paul's boys as decadent and unworldly, "Groton boys were described in the same terms by Exeter boys, and Exeter boys in (almost) the same terms by high-school boys, and so on ... [until the point where] all boarding-school boys are described, without distinction, as a bunch of fairies.")

Auchincloss' upbringing was a case in point. Auchincloss' own father sent him to boarding school out of concern that a child who grew up "in a woman's world of cushions and caresses ... would turn into a sissy". But Auchincloss' brother—who was also sent to Groton—left a career in the Foreign Service for "a life of pleasure and leisure", and Auchincloss said that "I could have almost lived on what [he] expended on shirts and cufflinks." A lapsed Presbyterian, he later wrote that most of his Groton classmates stopped going to church as adults, but hedged that while "the Ivy League of my day" may have been "godless ... it certainly did not lack ideals".

The ending of the novel emphasizes that the American aristocracy must reform to survive. Despite his early ambivalence for the reformist Franklin Roosevelt, Auchincloss later admitted that Roosevelt "was not a traitor to his class" but "its last great representative". Christopher Dahl writes that the novel's ending suggests "there remains some good in a flawed institution like Justin Martyr, and it is better to support [] mild reforms ... than to abandon the battle altogether."

=== Internal contradictions and self-delusion ===
Despite Prescott's best intentions, he "does not see, and [Aspinwall] only dimly glimpses," that there is a "fundamental irony implicit in attempting to foster 'democratic' ideals in [an upper-class] institution" like Justin Martyr. Auchincloss commented that he "wanted [Prescott] to express the agony of failing ridiculously when he wanted at the very least to fail magnificently". He said that Endicott Peabody must have reached a Prescott-like epiphany about his school's failure, explaining that while Peabody must have known that "half the Groton family paid only lip service to his ideals ... and that he had failed to persuade his boys to receive Christ", nobody in the Groton community wanted to admit this to him. Auchincloss implied that he had gotten this impression from Peabody's confidant Malcolm Strachan. However, he also wrote that "if Dr. Peabody had his moments of despair, they didn't show."

The novel's main characters personify the internal contradictions of WASP society. One of the novel's recurring themes is that "there is something about exclusive boarding schools that magnifies the most juvenile tendencies of adults." Prescott is "a man of intellect and idealism who could be noble, generous and kind but also, by turns, cruel, callous and arbitrary", and "one of the central strengths of the novel" is that it supports "widely divergent conclusions" about Prescott, with Auchincloss "go[ing] out of his way to present the negative as well as positive aspects of Prescott's character". Christopher Dahl notes that the novel repeatedly provides examples of Prescott's "goodness and spiritual strength, only to follow each of them immediately with an instance of his pettiness or meanness".

Robert M. Adams suggested that the book did not make its point clear enough, expressing concern that no individual narrator clearly explained that "a private New England Episcopal prep school [is not a] very distinct alternative to a world of money and snobbery". As an example, he wrote that Aspinwall also displays some of the flaws of the racist and classist trustees who seek to claim Prescott as their own, and that the novel was ultimately "an analysis of a petrified old windbag, unwittingly revealed as such by his most devoted admirer". Auchincloss agreed that Aspinwall was a flawed character, commenting that while Aspinwall ends the book resolving to write a biography of Prescott, "personally, I doubt if Brian would have been able to finish it."

== Contemporary reception ==
=== Commercial response ===
The Rector of Justin was a major commercial success. It topped the New York Times best-seller list for one week, and competed for first place for thirty-five weeks. It was the sixth-best-selling fiction book of 1964, and had sold 2 million copies by 1966. However, the novel's chief competitor for end-of-year literary honors, Saul Bellow's Herzog, spent 29 weeks at #1, finished third on the yearly rankings for both 1964 and 1965, and sold considerably more hardcover copies (142,000 to 80,000).

Walter Wanger optioned the film rights for MGM. He recruited George Cukor to direct, Samuel A. Taylor to write the screenplay, and Spencer Tracy and Katharine Hepburn to play the leads. However, Tracy was in poor health and the film was never made.

=== Critical response and awards consideration ===
Critics generally praised the novel. It was a finalist for the Pulitzer Prize for Fiction and the National Book Award for Fiction, losing to Shirley Ann Grau's The Keeper of the House and Bellow's Herzog, respectively. Although Pulitzer jurors Lewis Stiles Gannett and Maxwell Geismar personally disliked Herzog, they picked The Keeper of the House over The Rector of Justin in part because the latter was "precisely ... the kind of novel to which the prize has been awarded in the past". Geismar also dismissed Auchincloss' work as insubstantial, explaining that while he typically gave Auchincloss favorable reviews, his books were "polished entertainment and nothing else". Auchincloss admitted that it was "silly of me to mind" losing the awards, but was wounded nonetheless.

Despite the award snubs, J. Donald Adams (The New York Times), Leon Edel (Life), and Time magazine argued that The Rector of Justin sealed Auchincloss' place in the league of major American novelists. Auchincloss was elected to the American Academy of Arts and Letters the following year, and later served as the Academy's president. In addition, Paul Pickrel (Harper's Magazine) called the novel "almost certainly the finest work ever written about an American preparatory school", and Edmund Fuller (The Wall Street Journal) said that A Separate Peace was Auchincloss' only competition for the title.

Critics were particularly impressed with Auchincloss' characterization and subtlety of manner. Orville Prescott (The New York Times) called the novel "deeply human," saying it demonstrated an "emotional power and [] psychological fascination ... rarely found in anybody's [work]." Stephen Spender said that while he thought Herzog was a more interesting book, "The Rector of Justin is not just another debunking novel about a Victorian prig," because through Auchincloss' detailing of Prescott's internal contradictions, "[f]ew characters in modern fiction have been portrayed so completely in the round." Edith Copeland (University of Oklahoma) was impressed by Auchincloss' "precise, disciplined crystalline prose under perfect control", which had "no need of melodrama". Whitney Balliett (The New Yorker) said that Auchincloss had written a "model novel," with "poise and taste and intelligence ... on every page." Leon Edel praised the novel for "subtly tak[ing] [its] legends apart before our eyes", and Time wrote that "Auchincloss writes in the manner of Henry James, finding great moral dilemmas in small events".

Reviews were not universally positive, and several commentators argued that Auchincloss should have been more critical of his class. The New York Review of Books, a brand-new "radical chic" literary magazine published by boarding-school alumnus A. Whitney Ellsworth (St. Paul's '54), (Note: During the turbulent 1960s, many of the most radical critics of the status quo were actually WASPs. During the 1969 occupation of Harvard's University Hall, "approximately 50 percent [of the occupying students who were arrested] attended prep school, with the largest representation from the most exclusive ones"; by way of comparison, 40 percent of the student body were prep school alumni.) panned the novel; its critic Robert M. Adams said that Auchincloss' critique of the boarding school system was "fake criticism" and "afraid to ask the questions that hurt". Leigh Bienen (Transition) likewise dismissed the book as "pleasant and not very profound," having achieved commercial popularity by "present[ing] little threat to either reader or author". More broadly, several critics noted that Auchincloss' books consistently dealt with a small slice of American society.

Artistically, several reviewers, including Edward Weeks (Atlantic Monthly), wrote that the novel's six narrators were too similar; Orville Prescott's otherwise laudatory review dryly quipped that "by a happy chance and a familiar literary convention, the six observers are all expert novelists." Certain aspects of the book were singled out as unrealistic, including the dialogue (Robert Adams) and Aspinwall's character (Times Literary Supplement). Many years later, Auchincloss acknowledged the criticism of his dialogue but protested that "I don't particularly care about having [my characters] talk realistically," because "before the 20th century it really didn't occur to many writers that their language had to be the language of everyday speech. ... I want my characters to get their ideas across, and I want them to be articulate."

== The end of an era ==
According to one academic, "The Rector of Justin brought its author recognition and popularity, but did little in the long run to secure him a prominent place in postwar American literature". By 1985, Vanity Fair noted that Auchincloss "is never mentioned in lists of great American writers" and "has won no important prizes". In 1995, one critic even said that The Rector of Justin was the "only [Auchincloss] book to receive substantial critical praise". Auchincloss was a four-time finalist for the National Book Award for Fiction, but his last finalist recognition came in 1967.

=== The search for a new fiction ===
The Rector of Justin was published after at least a decade of growing discomfort with society novelists. The year the novel was published, Howard Mumford Jones and Richard M. Ludwig wrote in their Guide to American Literature that literary fiction had been attracted to a "mood of experimentation" since the mid-1920s. They listed Auchincloss' The Great World and Timothy Colt (1956) as an example of a novel to which contemporary "[l]iterary histories [were] commonly unkind". (Note: Jones and Ludwig later updated their Guide to add The Rector of Justin as a representative example of the modern "conventional" novel.) Auchincloss' friend Gore Vidal added that the literary establishment had been dismissing Auchincloss' style since the early 1950s, and that critics had unfairly criticized him for "never question[ing] [WASP society's] values in any serious way".

Auchincloss himself worried that his reputation as a society writer was dragging down both his sales and his critical reputation. In 1953, he urged his publisher Houghton Mifflin to change its marketing strategy, explaining that "the public that wants 'society' books doesn't want my sort of books. They want something more Ouida [i.e., melodramatic]. And the others are disgusted by the tag." Nor was Auchincloss purely an author of the old school. Even "conventional" writers of the period still employed elements of modernist fiction, such as "a deeper richness of psychology, a distrust of classifying human beings into types, and a greater flexibility of style." (For example, the Charley Strong section of The Rector of Justin was Auchincloss' spin on avant-garde prose. Although one scholar called it "easily ... the most uncharacteristic piece of prose" in his career, Auchincloss regarded it with fondness.) In any event, starting with Pursuit of the Prodigal (1959), a finalist for the National Book Award, Auchincloss' critical and commercial reputation began improving, and his books frequently made best-seller lists. The House of Five Talents (1960) sold 25,000 hardcover copies and was also an NBA finalist.

Although The Rector of Justin was warmly received by audiences and critics, even contemporary reviewers characterized Auchincloss as the last of a dying breed of society author. Virgilia Peterson (The New York Times) wrote that the novel was another example of Auchincloss "imperturbably writing traditional society novels despite the fact that this kind of novel and this society are both supposed to be dead." Edith Copeland agreed that Auchincloss was one of America's only remaining novelists to concentrate on "well established members of the social order". A minority of critics hoped that the novel's success could help reverse this trend, and used it to criticize literary and social modernism, including the Virginia Quarterly Review (which emphasized the novel's "quiet authority in an age of literary hysteria") and Catholic commentators William F. Buckley Jr. and Edward P. J. Corbett.

Society in Proust parades before us, having to represent not a segment of mankind, but something closer to mankind itself. It is the very boldness of Proust's assumption that his universe is the universe ... that gives to his distorted people a certain universal validity.

— Auchincloss on Marcel Proust

Auchincloss repeatedly argued that his intended audience was much broader than his limited cast of characters. He noted that Proust's works also focused on a limited stratum of society and that non-WASPs like Sidney Lumet (who he said understood The Rector of Justin perfectly) could still enjoy his work. He admitted that he focused on the New York upper class for convenience, as that background "is a familiar one to me and is hence more available as a model." However, he emphasized that ordinary people could relate to his characters' universal problems, questioning why "critics did not resent Anna Karenina or Colonel Newcome." Gore Vidal added that Auchincloss' society was still relevant in 1960s and 1970s America, and that by downplaying the continuing relevance of WASPs in big business and philanthropy, literary critics revealed their own "remoteness ... from actual power".

=== The new fiction arrives ===
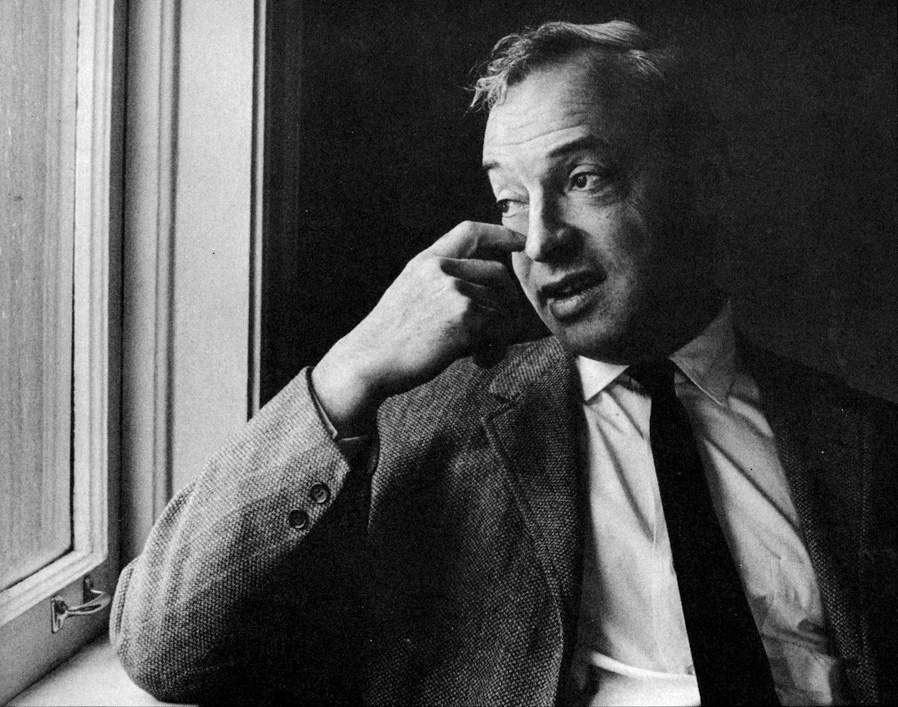
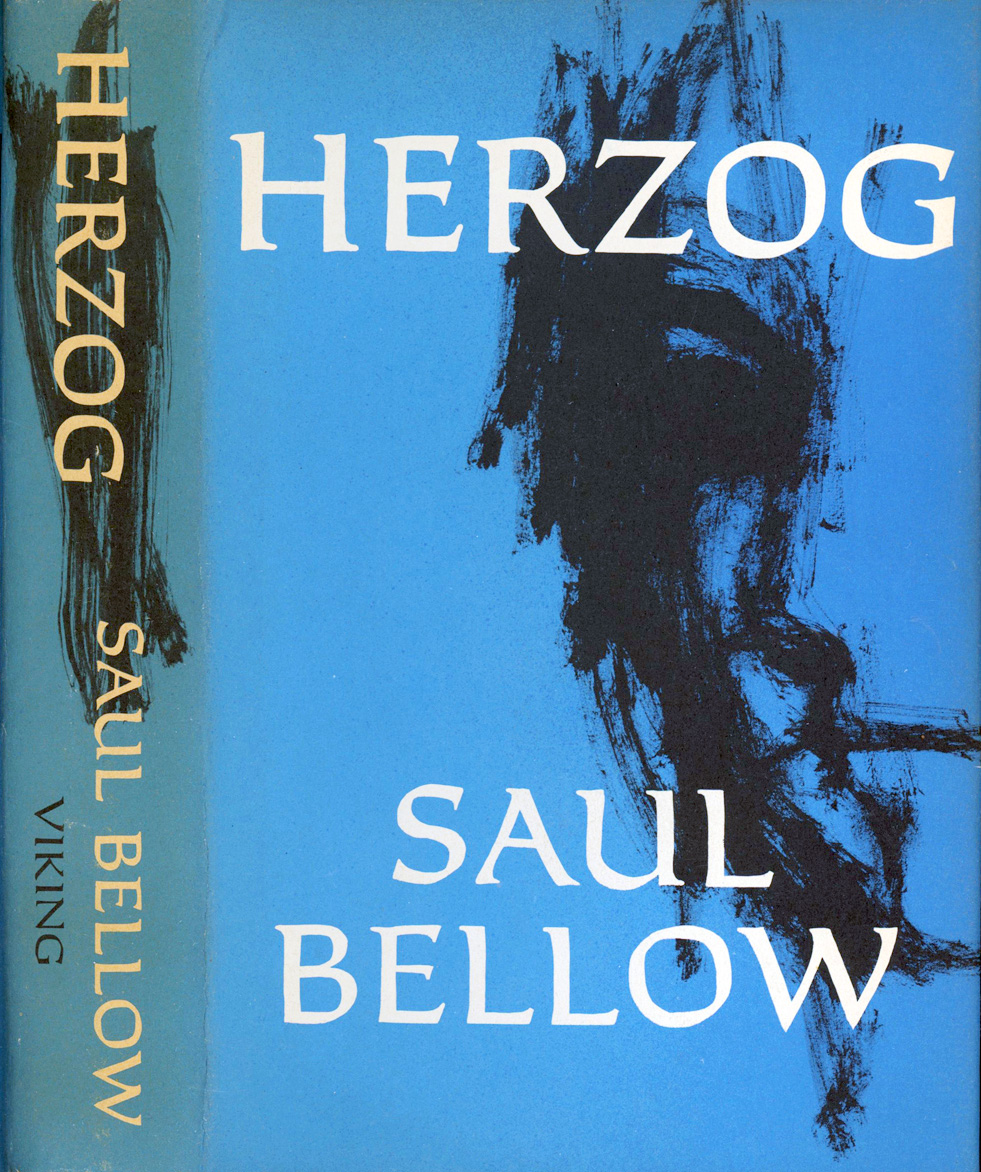
Saul Bellow's Herzog beat The Rector of Justin for the 1965 National Book Award for Fiction. Bellow's modern writing style and comparatively diverse cast of characters proved more influential than Auchincloss' understated realism.

At the end of 1964, Francis Brown (The New York Times) drew a distinction between The Rector of Justin and its awards-season competitor, Bellow's Herzog. He explained that the choice between the two reflected a fork in the road for American literature:

"We have writers who adhere in the main to the content, form and style of the novel and short story that are traditional and classic. We have experimentalists, here and abroad, who reject old forms, old styles. There is a conflict of philosophies: belief that life has a purpose, or if it doesn't, at least the living of life can have some joy to it, contends with insistence that there is nothing to life but the living of it, and that even that is absurd. ... [The Rector of Justin] is all most absorbing and convincing but it is told in a form that is familiar and in a style that shows no experimental flourish. ... By contrast, [Herzog] is as unconventional in its form as in the manner of its telling, and [], to be vulgar about it, packs a fresh and mighty wallop."

Brown was not the only critic to compare the two novels. His Times colleague J. Donald Adams—a self-avowed traditionalist who believed that the novel of manners was still "the most interesting form of fiction"—called Herzog's victory over The Rector of Justin a "miscarriage of justice" and Bellow's novel "little more" than "vogue". He added that Auchincloss was "the best living American novelist" and that he had "little confidence" in the generation of modernist authors that included Bellow and Norman Mailer. Mailer, for his own part, opined that "the maudlin middle reaches of The Rector of Justin" represented "the bankruptcy of the novel of manners". He praised the character of Moses Herzog because "it says: I am debased, I am failed, I am near to rotten, and yet something just as good and loving resides in me as the tenderest part of your childhood", and concluded that Herzog lay "at the center of the modern dilemma".

As Mailer alluded, the Herzog-Justin debate reflected broader disputes about American society. Granville Hicks admitted that "to many people, myself included ... a bewildered intellectual in search of wholeness of spirit belongs more truly to our times than the aged headmaster of a fashionable preparatory school". Time (which at the time "reflected a WASP upper-class point of view") favored Auchincloss' "Establishment tale" and panned Herzog, while rival Newsweek (which catered to urban sophisticates, "underdogs", and fans of the avant-garde) praised Herzog and mocked The Rector of Justin for its "tired sentimentality". In a further twist of the knife, Newsweek suggested that pseudo-intellectuals liked reading Auchincloss because he made them feel sophisticated and "educated." In his 1966 novel Too Far to Walk, John Hersey dramatized the conflict by describing The Rector of Justin as a novel that a college student is assigned to read in a political science class, in contrast to Herzog, which was assigned in a religion and sexuality class flippantly dubbed "Totems and Scrotums".

Herzog, like many modernist novels of the time, focused on the trials and tribulations of "the American intellectual male". Auchincloss went in a different direction, and followed up The Rector of Justin with an essay collection in which he critiqued, as Ellen Moers (The New York Times) summarized, "the dominant (in America) masculine fiction of rootlessness and rejection". Drawing from the works of nine American women novelists, he argued that female writers had traditionally provided a "more affirmative note" in American literature, and that while his subjects agreed that modern society had problems, they still wanted to identify elements worth keeping.

=== Modernism triumphant ===
Bellow won the 1976 Nobel Prize in Literature. When the Swedish Academy presented him with the award, Karl Ragnar Gierow remarked that he had helped lead the "emancipation from the previous ideal style" in American fiction. Gierow added that Bellow's novels demonstrated "penetrating insight into the outer and inner complications that drive us to act or prevent us from acting and that can be the dilemma of our age."

Tracing the development of postwar American literary fiction, Leo Robson (The New Yorker) concluded that Herzog helped "tip[] the balance in favor of the poetic and demotic, the Romantic and expansive", which in turn prompted critics to downgrade formalist and realist novels like The Rector of Justin. Catherine Kord (The Antioch Review) agreed that "with the avant-garde seeking new ways of presenting fiction ... Auchincloss's New York can seem quaint or even marginal." Time also proved that the women authors Auchincloss courted were also attracted to literary modernism. One writer suggested that by 1989, "the bulk of [American] novelists—male and female—[were] still closer to Barry Hannah than they are to Louis Auchincloss."

Beyond stylistic shifts, Auchincloss was dogged by the perception that novels were not his strong point. (Note: Auchincloss noted that book publishers of the period were reluctant to publish short story collections, which they deemed bad for business.) Vidal said that while Auchincloss was a "superb short-story writer", he was merely a "good novelist". (Norman Mailer, hardly a fan, still envied Auchincloss' short story "The Gemlike Flame.") Merle Rubin (Los Angeles Times) agreed that Auchincloss' short stories generally outstripped his novels, but felt that The Rector of Justin was an exception and opined that "it hardly seems fair to penalize his productivity by holding his less accomplished books against him". Frank N. Magill (Salem Press) and Mark Oppenheimer (Tablet) wrote that Auchincloss' post-Justin works tended to recycle the Justin formula, which (in Magill's words) "threaten[ed] to undermine, even in retrospect, the reputation justly earned by his best work." Auchincloss' prolific output also attracted criticism: he published roughly one book a year, and admitted that he could have taken more time revising his works.

Other critics blamed politics for Auchincloss' comparative slide into obscurity. Gerald Russello (The New Criterion) opined that "because Auchincloss did not explicitly disdain the WASPs, he didn't ascend to that league of writers dutifully 'problematizing' formerly standard American tropes." Bruce Bawer (The New York Times) argued that modern critics ignored Auchincloss not just because his viewpoints were unpopular, but because "the questions [Auchincloss asks] themselves are politically incorrect; they concern social facts that we're supposed to pretend nowadays not to notice."

Auchincloss predicted his own critical decline, but was unable to stop it. During the 1965 awards season, he told Gore Vidal that "the year of The Rector of Justin had given way to the glorious era of Herzog and we are now dim figures of a gentile American past". He concluded that "we had our day, and though we lacked Moral Seriousness, in our Waspish way, we had style."

== Modern appraisals ==
The Rector of Justin is generally considered Auchincloss' best work. (Note: For example, see the following sources.) In 2008, Larissa MacFarquhar (The New Yorker) wrote that The Rector of Justin was Auchincloss' masterpiece "because it is one of the few times he permits his elegiac moralism to dominate a book. He loves his mad Puritans, and believes they are no more." In her 1993 biography of Auchincloss, Carol Gelderman wrote that it was one of Auchincloss' three best works, along with The House of Five Talents and Portrait in Brownstone.

Auchincloss enjoyed a brief critical revival in the 1980s. In 1977, Jackson Bryer assembled an extensive bibliography of Auchincloss' career, including a list of book reviews from around the world. This was followed by two book-length academic studies of Auchincloss' career by Christopher Dahl and David Parsell and a dissertation by Vincent Piket. Parsell proclaimed that The Rector of Justin was "unquestionably" the best American boarding school novel. The new critics challenged Auchincloss' reputation for inaccessibility to ordinary Americans, with Bryer pointing out that "local book editors ... have been his most consistent and enthusiastic supporters." Dahl and Susan Cheever (Vanity Fair) also recognized Auchincloss' sympathy for and depiction of the lives of women; Cheever explained that Auchincloss was "one of a handful of male writers whose sympathy for women is so extraordinary that his female characters are as complete and convincing as his men." At the end of the decade, Whit Stillman's 1990 film Metropolitan used the novel as a metonym for a new generation of upper-crust Americans’ "self-questioning and unease at the perspective of social decline and a descent into irrelevance." However, not all the attention was positive. Michiko Kakutani (The New York Times) concluded in 1984 that "while [Auchincloss] is adept enough at portraying the effects of a rarified milieu on character, his narrative lacks a necessary density and texture." Dahl coupled his praise of Justin with critiques of Auchincloss' later career, which Auchincloss still fumed about a decade later.

In the 21st century, Michael Tolkin (Los Angeles Review of Books) and Mark Oppenheimer (Tablet) expressed a renewed interest in Auchincloss' writing style. Tolkin opined that his deliberately understated delivery obscured the full depth of his characters, like how a lawyer would "seal[] ... the most exciting material behind attorney-client privilege". Oppenheimer embraced how Auchincloss' prose could be from "1920, or 1940—some imagined time when sentences had the leisure to amble around, tasting and then regurgitating highbrow references and allusions, not rushing to any forced conclusion." Although he did not consider Auchincloss a great writer in general, he predicted that The Rector of Justin would "someday be recognized as a classic."

Auchincloss just seems to have such painful nostalgia for this world .... Intellectually, [he] knows that his heroes, these characters he loves, are morally bad, or at least limited. But he finds them beautiful anyway, and he mourns their passing.

Many of us do, I think. Now that Jews have been admitted to the club, we discover that it's a rip-off, with bad food and overpriced drinks. There's a poignant sense that maybe, in another time, it really was glamorous, that once we were being excluded from something worth having. The morality was bad, but the aesthetic was grand.

— Mark Oppenheimer

Auchincloss' death in 2010 prompted a new round of revisionist reflections, which acknowledged his cutting social commentary and, in some cases, used nostalgia for Auchincloss' WASPs to criticize the new American elite. Eric Homberger (The Guardian) remembered him for "interrogat[ing] the values, class consciousness and self-representations of the most powerful people in the world's most powerful nation." Boris Kachka (Vulture) similarly hailed him as the "conscience of an elite", writing that his novels recalled an age where the establishment had a "sense of shame". Rupert Cornwell (The Independent) argued that while Auchincloss had skewered the old elite, "the country was the poorer" for its fall from power. As Ross Douthat (The New York Times) later put it, while the world of The Rector of Justin is gone, the notion of an American elite remains, and that elite’s attempt to replace its founding principles with diversity and meritocracy "is harder than it looks, and even perhaps a contradiction in terms."

== See also ==
- List of The New York Times number-one books of 1964
- School story

== Sources ==
- Aldred, Sam (2017). "'The Gentleman's Burden': The Anglican Heritage of Episcopal Boarding Schools, 1880–1940". Anglican and Episcopal History. 86 (3): 272–286. ISSN 0896-8039. JSTOR 26335970.
- Auchincloss, Louis (1964). The Rector of Justin (2002 ed.). Boston, MA: Mariner Books. ISBN 9780618224890.
- Auchincloss, Louis (1968). "Writing The Rector of Justin". In McCormack, Thomas (ed.). Afterwords: Novelists on Their Novels (1988 ed.). New York: St. Martin's Press. pp. 2–9. ISBN 0312013825.
- Auchincloss, Louis (1974). A Writer's Capital. Minneapolis, MN: University of Minnesota Press. ISBN 0816607079.
- Auchincloss, Louis (2010). A Voice from Old New York: A Memoir of My Youth. New York: Houghton Mifflin Harcourt. ISBN 9780547341538.
- Baltzell, E. Digby (1976). "The Protestant Establishment Revisited". The American Scholar. 45 (4): 499–518. ISSN 0003-0937.
- Bryer, Jackson R. (1977). Louis Auchincloss and His Critics: A Bibliographical Record. Boston, MA: G. K. Hall & Co. ISBN 9780816179657.
- Dahl, Christopher C. (1986). Louis Auchincloss. New York: Ungar Publishing. ISBN 0804421234.
- Gelderman, Carol (1993). Louis Auchincloss: A Writer's Life. New York: Crown Publishers. ISBN 9780517587201.
- Parsell, David B. (1988). Louis Auchincloss. Boston, MA: Twayne. ISBN 9780805775167.
- Piket, Vincent (1989). Louis Auchincloss: The Growth of a Novelist (PDF). Nijmegen, Gelderland: Radboud University.
- Pitofsky, Alexander H. (2014). American Boarding School Fiction, 1928-1981: A Critical Study. Jefferson, NC: McFarland & Company. ISBN 9780786478651.
- Tuttleton, James W. (1998). "Louis Auchincloss: The Image of Lost Elegance and Virtue". A Fine Silver Thread: Essays on American Writing and Criticism. Chicago, IL: Ivan R. Dee. pp. 238–55. ISBN 1566631815.
