= Christopher Dahl =

Christopher Dahl may refer to:

- Christopher Dahl (administrator) (born 1946), president emeritus of the State University of New York at Geneseo
- Christopher Dahl (sailor) (1898–1966), Norwegian sailor

== See also ==
- Christoffer Dahl, Norwegian footballer
