= James Feibleman =

American philosopher (1904 – 1987)

James Kern Feibleman (1904 - 1987) was a philosopher at Tulane University, Louisiana. From 1952 he edited Tulane Studies in Philosophy. He styled his system as axiological realism.

== Early life ==
Feibleman was born July 13, 1904, in New Orleans, Louisiana.

At the age of nineteen I was sent north to take my last year of preparatory education at Horace Mann School in New York where I was graduated with honors in mathematics... I learned more in New York in a year than I had learned at home in four, more than I learned the following year at University of Virginia.

Returning to New Orleans, he worked in his family's department store and took up a study of business philosophy with Julius Friend. Together they authored Science and the Spirit of Man (1933), The Unlimited Commodity (1936), and What Science Really Means (1937).

"John McClure the poet…was a big help to me in the days of my late adolescence...I used to go down on his night off and sit on the porch of his French Quarter home and drink the eggnog which his wife made and talk poetry with him...McClure’s advice was something I never forgot, and I shall always be grateful to him."

Feibelman spent summers in Europe, in London and Rive Gauche, meeting with his peers at Le Dôme Café and Café de la Rotonde.

In lieu of a college program, Feibleman listed his readings with Friend in philosophy: "Plato and Aristotle, then reading the Stoics and Epicureans, the Neo-platonists, the medieval theologians, the Continental rationalists, the British empiricists, the German dogmatists, until we came again to modern philosophy where we found Reid and the early Moore, the early Russell, Nicolai Hartmann, Whitehead and Peirce the most congenial."

== Career ==
"In 1943, despite the fact that Feibleman had no college degree, Tulane University offered him his first academic position as acting assistant professor of English, hired to teach naval officers in training." "I sat in on mathematics courses given by my friends. I became a sort of hanger-on of the mathematics department, hoping to acquire by osmosis what I had refused to imbibe in the ordinary way by submission to discipline." "I remember taking Kelley's graduate course in mathematical logic, the last field which you might suppose to be exciting, but I remember the excitement."

Feibleman studied the first six volumes of the Collected Papers of Peirce and formulated a systematic philosophy from the various essays Peirce had written. Using direct quotations with citations to the Collected Papers, Feibleman published An Introduction to the Philosophy of Charles S. Peirce in 1946 with The MIT Press, and Bertrand Russell wrote the foreword.

He joined the philosophy department in 1945, and became department head in 1957, retiring from there in 1969. The Louisiana State University hired him as lecturer in psychiatry from 1958 to 67.

Feibleman put forth his system in Ontology (1951) where he posited three universes: essence or possibility, existence or actuality, and destiny or teleology. Huntington Cairns edited Two-story World, Selected Writings of James K. Feibleman (1966). "The name of my father's department store was 'Feiblemann's', with underneath the motto 'The House of Values'... Since I have made philosophy my preoccupation, one of my chief concerns has been to establish on a firm footing the branch of philosophy known as axiology or value-theory. In a way, I feel that I am carrying out my father’s wishes."

In addition to his many works in philosophy, Feibleman wrote popular works, first for The Double Dealer and later a series for New York Post: Understanding Philosophy: A Popular History of Ideas (1973). His second wife, Shirley Ann Grau wrote novels and short stories.

In 1973 Northwestern University School of Law invited Feibleman to present a Rosenthal Lecture on philosophical perspectives on justice. "Justice is the demand for a system of laws", where a system is defined to be consistent, complete, and categorical. Feibleman adopted these terms from mathematical logic.

In 1969 Horizon Press published his autobiography The Way of a Man.

Ontology manifesto: Those who are brave and who wish a new world which will have the virtues lacking in the old and will lack the vices common in the old, may use their imagination together with the values and the logical relations learned in the past, to set up an ideal toward which the actual world may be brought.

— The Way of a Man (page 91)
