= List of The New York Times number-one books of 1964 =

This is a list of books that topped The New York Times best-seller list in 1964.

== Fiction ==
The following list ranks the number-one best-selling fiction books.

Only four books topped the list that year, the list being dominated for 34 weeks by John le Carré's spy novel The Spy Who Came in from the Cold. The prolific novelist Louis Auchincloss had his only No. 1 bestseller that year (and only for one week at the top, though it lasted 33 weeks in the top 5).

Date	Book	Author
January 5	The Group	Mary McCarthy
January 12	The Group	Mary McCarthy
January 19	The Group	Mary McCarthy
January 26	The Group	Mary McCarthy
February 2	The Group	Mary McCarthy
February 9	The Group	Mary McCarthy
February 16	The Group	Mary McCarthy
February 23	The Spy Who Came in from the Cold	John le Carré
March 1	The Spy Who Came in from the Cold	John le Carré
March 8	The Spy Who Came in from the Cold	John le Carré
March 15	The Spy Who Came in from the Cold	John le Carré
March 22	The Spy Who Came in from the Cold	John le Carré
March 29	The Spy Who Came in from the Cold	John le Carré
April 5	The Spy Who Came in from the Cold	John le Carré
April 12	The Spy Who Came in from the Cold	John le Carré
April 19	The Spy Who Came in from the Cold	John le Carré
April 26	The Spy Who Came in from the Cold	John le Carré
May 3	The Spy Who Came in from the Cold	John le Carré
May 10	The Spy Who Came in from the Cold	John le Carré
May 17	The Spy Who Came in from the Cold	John le Carré
May 24	The Spy Who Came in from the Cold	John le Carré
May 31	The Spy Who Came in from the Cold	John le Carré
June 7	The Spy Who Came in from the Cold	John le Carré
June 14	The Spy Who Came in from the Cold	John le Carré
June 21	The Spy Who Came in from the Cold	John le Carré
June 28	The Spy Who Came in from the Cold	John le Carré
July 5	The Spy Who Came in from the Cold	John le Carré
July 12	The Spy Who Came in from the Cold	John le Carré
July 19	The Spy Who Came in from the Cold	John le Carré
July 26	The Spy Who Came in from the Cold	John le Carré
August 2	The Spy Who Came in from the Cold	John le Carré
August 9	The Spy Who Came in from the Cold	John le Carré
August 16	The Spy Who Came in from the Cold	John le Carré
August 23	The Spy Who Came in from the Cold	John le Carré
August 30	The Spy Who Came in from the Cold	John le Carré
September 6	The Spy Who Came in from the Cold	John le Carré
September 13	The Spy Who Came in from the Cold	John le Carré
September 20	The Spy Who Came in from the Cold	John le Carré
September 27	The Spy Who Came in from the Cold	John le Carré
October 4	The Rector of Justin	Louis Auchincloss
October 11	The Spy Who Came in from the Cold	John le Carré
October 18	The Spy Who Came in from the Cold	John le Carré
October 25	Herzog	Saul Bellow
November 1	Herzog	Saul Bellow
November 8	Herzog	Saul Bellow
November 15	Herzog	Saul Bellow
November 22	Herzog	Saul Bellow
November 29	Herzog	Saul Bellow
December 6	Herzog	Saul Bellow
December 13	Herzog	Saul Bellow
December 20	Herzog	Saul Bellow
December 27	Herzog	Saul Bellow

== Nonfiction ==
The following list ranks the number-one best-selling nonfiction books.

Date	Book	Author
January 5	Profiles in Courage	John F. Kennedy
January 12	Profiles in Courage	John F. Kennedy
January 19	Profiles in Courage	John F. Kennedy
January 26	Profiles in Courage	John F. Kennedy
February 2	Profiles in Courage	John F. Kennedy
February 9	Profiles in Courage	John F. Kennedy
February 16	Profiles in Courage	John F. Kennedy
February 23	Profiles in Courage	John F. Kennedy
March 1	Profiles in Courage	John F. Kennedy
March 8	Profiles in Courage	John F. Kennedy
March 15	Profiles in Courage	John F. Kennedy
March 22	Four Days	UPI and American Heritage Magazine
March 29	Four Days	UPI and American Heritage Magazine
April 5	Four Days	UPI and American Heritage Magazine
April 12	Four Days	UPI and American Heritage Magazine
April 19	Four Days	UPI and American Heritage Magazine
April 26	Four Days	UPI and American Heritage Magazine
May 3	Four Days	UPI and American Heritage Magazine
May 10	Four Days	UPI and American Heritage Magazine
May 17	Four Days	UPI and American Heritage Magazine
May 24	Four Days	UPI and American Heritage Magazine
May 31	Four Days	UPI and American Heritage Magazine
June 7	Four Days	UPI and American Heritage Magazine
June 14	A Moveable Feast	Ernest Hemingway
June 21	A Moveable Feast	Ernest Hemingway
June 28	A Moveable Feast	Ernest Hemingway
July 5	A Moveable Feast	Ernest Hemingway
July 12	A Moveable Feast	Ernest Hemingway
July 19	A Moveable Feast	Ernest Hemingway
July 26	A Moveable Feast	Ernest Hemingway
August 2	A Moveable Feast	Ernest Hemingway
August 9	A Moveable Feast	Ernest Hemingway
August 16	A Moveable Feast	Ernest Hemingway
August 23	A Moveable Feast	Ernest Hemingway
August 30	A Moveable Feast	Ernest Hemingway
September 6	A Moveable Feast	Ernest Hemingway
September 13	A Moveable Feast	Ernest Hemingway
September 20	A Moveable Feast	Ernest Hemingway
September 27	A Moveable Feast	Ernest Hemingway
October 4	A Moveable Feast	Ernest Hemingway
October 11	A Moveable Feast	Ernest Hemingway
October 18	A Moveable Feast	Ernest Hemingway
October 25	Reminiscences	Douglas MacArthur
November 1	Reminiscences	Douglas MacArthur
November 8	Reminiscences	Douglas MacArthur
November 15	Reminiscences	Douglas MacArthur
November 22	Reminiscences	Douglas MacArthur
November 29	Reminiscences	Douglas MacArthur
December 6	Reminiscences	Douglas MacArthur
December 13	Reminiscences	Douglas MacArthur
December 20	Markings	Dag Hammarskjöld
December 27	Markings	Dag Hammarskjöld

== See also ==
- Publishers Weekly list of bestselling novels in the United States in the 1960s
