= Entre Deux Guerres =

Entre Deux Guerres may refer to:

- French for the interwar period between World War I and World War II (1918–1939)
- A chronological grouping for a collection of short stories within Manhattan Monologues by Louis Auchincloss
