= John McClure (poet) =

American poet

John Peebles McClure (December 19, 1893 – February 8, 1956) was an American poet and one of the founding editors of The Double Dealer literary magazine.

== Early life ==
John Peebles McClure was born in Ardmore, Chickasaw Nation, Indian Territory (located in Oklahoma) to John Alexander and Mary Elizabeth Peebles McClure. His mother died in 1896 and the family moved several times, finally settling in Chickasha around 1901. John attended both public and private schools before entering the University of Oklahoma in 1911. After getting his B.A. in 1915, he worked at the university library. During World War I he served in the U.S. Army cavalry and in the field artillery. After the war, he married librarian Grace Binford Smith (1918).

In 1919, the McClures moved to New Orleans, Louisiana, where they opened a bookstore. McClure also worked as a copy editor for the New Orleans Times-Picayune. He was to maintain a professional relationship with the Times-Picayune for 33 years, rising to managing editor.

== Literary career ==
McClure published his first poem in the London magazine The Egoist in 1914. His early style was influenced by William Blake, by English and Scottish ballads, and by Elizabeth lyric poetry. As his reputation grew, he published in a wide range of American literary magazines, including The American Mercury and Smart Set. H. L. Mencken, co-editor of Smart Set, considered McClure the "finest lyric poet" the nation had produced in fifty years. McClure's books includes Airs and Ballads (a collection of his own poems, 1918) and The Stag's Hornbook (a collection of drinking songs, 1918).

McClure was one of the four founding editors of The Double Dealer, a New Orleans–based literary magazine that was an early champion of William Faulkner and that published many other notable American modernist writers. McClure was widely admired for the book reviews he published in the Times-Picayune and the Double Dealer.

McClure acted as a mentor to young James Feibleman: when Feibleman noted that "artists are not appreciated in America" so he might move to France, McClure suggested, "Maybe it is because prospective young writers like yourself don't remain here and help...If the artists don't hang around, how can they hope to be appreciated."

McClure died in New Orleans on February 8, 1956. He was survived by his second wife, Joyce Kavanaugh Stagg, whom he had married in 1937.
