= Her Infinite Variety =

2001 novel by Louis Auchincloss

- First edition (publ. Houghton Mifflin)
- Author: Louis Auchincloss
- Publisher: Houghton Mifflin
- Publication date: August 8, 2000
- ISBN: 0-618-02191-4

Her Infinite Variety is a 2000 novel by American writer Louis Auchincloss about a career woman of the first half of the 20th century. The title is a quotation from Shakespeare's Antony and Cleopatra: "Age cannot wither her, nor custom stale / Her infinite variety" (Act II, scene 2). Kirkus Reviews called the book "[a]nother fine chapter in Auchincloss’s ongoing fictional chronicle of the American century." Publishers Weekly said "[Auchincloss] transcends himself with an astute and witty novel about a woman who disdains the old values of money and class in favor of a feminine meritocracy in the world of business."

== Plot summary ==
Born in New York in 1917, attractive Clarabel (Longcope) Hoyt, the heroine of the book, is encouraged by her ambitious mother to marry "a great man," a man able and willing to make a success of his life. She succeeds in persuading her daughter to end her relationship with a young teacher with a promising career ahead of him and marry into one of the pre-eminent, old money families instead. Eventually succumbing to her mother's wishes, Clara, still a virgin, marries Trevor Hoyt, a banker, and in due course their daughter Sandra is born.

Clara, however, is not content spending her husband's money and living a life of luxury and ease. When her old school friend Polly suggests that she should work for Style, a fashion magazine, Clara eagerly accepts the offer and soon becomes a household name as a trendy journalist. During World War II, while Hoyt is stationed in London and Clara remains in New York, both spouses are unfaithful to each other. On her husband's return, however, Clara is faced with the double standards of morality which exempt the man from any consequences of his infidelity while ascribing to the woman the role of sinner, of the "war wife who cheats on her fighting husband" or, as Trevor puts it, of the "cool bitch". Subsequently, and much to her mother's dismay, Clara divorces her husband, a generous divorce settlement ensuring that she does not quite have to "face the chilling prospect of depending on her own talents to support herself".

She becomes editor-in-chief of Style by exposing her predecessor's alcoholism and eventually starts an affair with Eric Tyler, the owner of the magazine. At the same time she gently but firmly turns Tyler Publications into an empire aligned with the Democratic Party. She also pulls the strings in making Eric Tyler a candidate for the U.S. Senate. However, driven by some inexplicable force, Tyler holds the "wrong" speech on tax reform, voicing what he really thinks on the matter and thus forfeiting all his chances of ever becoming a politician. It is with considerable difficulty that Clara answers Tyler's question whether she loves him—she is aware of the fact that her rather forced "Of course, I love you" is actually a lie. At this point in her life she very strongly questions her ability to love at all.

Nevertheless, Clara marries Eric Tyler, but the ailing tycoon suffers two strokes and dies. Clara is now faced with a lengthy lawsuit brought on by Tony Tyler, Eric's son by his first wife, who feels cheated out of the family money. Determined to fight to the end rather than compromise, Clara justifies, and also disguises, her luxurious lifestyle by continuing her late husband's foundation and openly and generously supporting philanthropic causes so that her public image turns into that of an "angel of beneficience".

Clara also likes to see herself as a patron of the arts, and it is in this capacity that she meets, and gets to know more intimately, Oliver Kip, an expert on the Italian Renaissance. She genuinely falls in love with him and wants to "belong to Oliver, to be appreciated by his cool, appraising eyes, to be added to his collection of beautiful objects". Their affair, however, is short-lived because he informs her that his life "is not the kind that can be improved by being shared" and also because the abuse of his power within the Tyler Foundation forces her to pay him off and hush up the scandal in order to save the foundation's reputation.

In the final scene of the novel, set in 1961, Clara is on the phone with John F. Kennedy, whose election she has supported, accepting Kennedy's offer to be made ambassador to the (fictional) island of Santa Emilia in the Caribbean.

== Publication history ==
- Auchincloss, Louis (2000). Her infinite variety. Boston: Houghton Mifflin. ISBN 0618021914.

== Read on ==
- Brand Whitlock: Her Infinite Variety (1904) (a young politician from Chicago society tries to help a young female lawyer pass a women's suffrage bill in the Illinois Senate)
- Joseph Hergesheimer: Linda Condon (1919) (lack of purpose in life among the privileged and well-to-do towards the end of the 19th century)
- Booth Tarkington: Alice Adams (1921) (girl encouraged by her mother to become a social climber at her father's expense)
- Philip Barry: Holiday (1928) (eligible young man disinclined to fit in with the work ethic of his wealthy surroundings)
- Jessie Redmon Fauset: Plum Bun: A Novel Without a Moral (1929) (the very rich seen from the angle of the less fortunate)
- Nancy Mitford: The Pursuit of Love (1945) and Love in a Cold Climate (1949) (the lives and loves of a rich aristocratic family in inter-war Britain).
