= Olive Leonhardt =

American painter

- Olive Leonhardt, Self Portrait
- Born: Olive Ellzey; 1895; Jackson, Mississippi
- Died: 1963 (aged 67–68)
- Known for: Illustration, Painting
- Movement: Modernism

Olive Ellzey Leonhardt (1895 -1963) was an illustrator and artist.

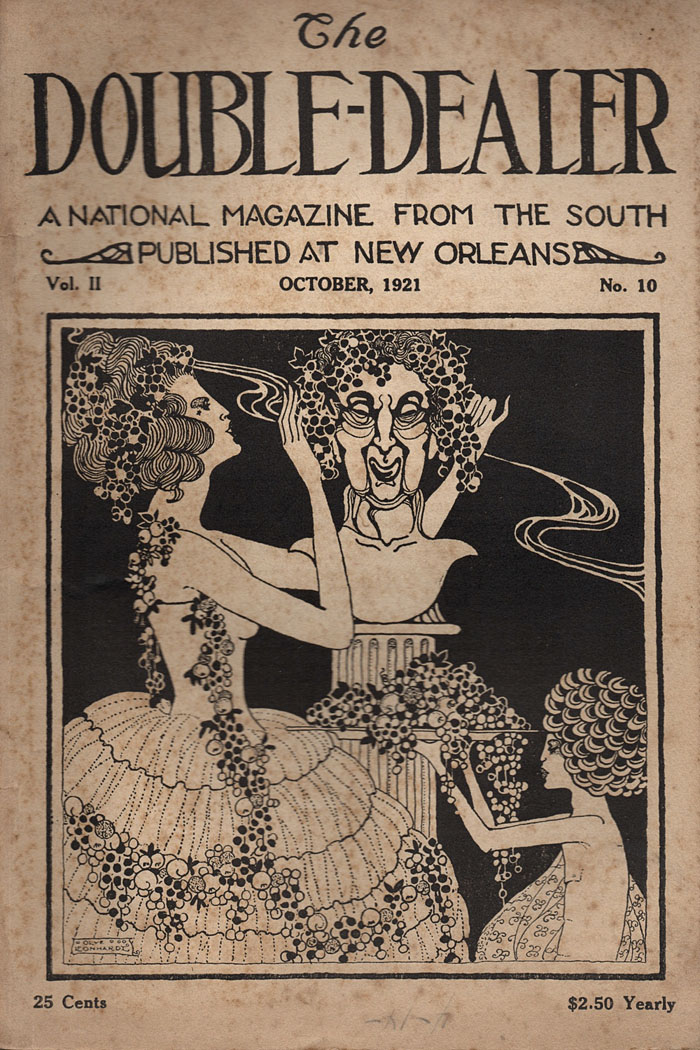
1921 "Double-Dealer" cover by Olive Leonhardt

She was born in Jackson, Mississippi, the daughter of Vernon Clifton Ellzey and Caroline Turnipseed. She attended Newcomb College (1914–15), The New York School of Fine and Applied Arts (later to be renamed Parsons) in 1915-16, and The Art Students League in 1926, where she studied with George Bridgman and Homer Boss. Olive Leonhardt drew the covers for The Double Dealer: A National Magazine from The South in 1921-22 and showed at the New Orleans Arts and Crafts Club. In 1938 Dale Press published a book of her drawings called "New Orleans: Drawn and Quartered" with a foreword by Lyle Saxon. She had a one-woman show at the Charles Morgan Gallery in 1939.

In the summer of 1947, Anaïs Nin visited Leonhardt in New Orleans with Gore Vidal and wrote this in her journal: "She is painting her dreams, she is painting people and New Orleans filtered through her vision. She sees the flaws, the ironies." (p. 202-3 of The Diary of Anaïs Nin. Vol four).

Leonhardt's oils were included in the post-Katrina show at The New Orleans Museum of Art in the 2007 show entitled "The New Orleans Arts and Crafts Club: An Artistic Legacy" and the 2009 show called "Women Artists in Louisiana, 1825-1965: A Place of Their Own." A revived interest in art of the 1930s has led to the 2012 show at The Hermitage Museum and Gardens in Norfolk, Virginia called "Drawn and Quartered: Olive Leonhardt, 1939 Revisited".
