= The Cat and the King =

1981 historical fiction novel

- First edition (US)
- Author: Louis Auchincloss
- Cover artist: Jean-Baptiste Martin, Perspective View from the Chateau of Versailles of the Place D'Armes and the Stables, 1688
- Language: English language
- Genre: Historical novel
- Publisher: Allen & Unwin (US); Weidenfeld & Nicolson (UK)
- Publication date: 1981
- Publication place: United States
- Media type: Print (hardback & paperback)

The Cat and the King (1981) is a work of historical fiction about the court of French King Louis XIV (1638–1715) by novelist Louis Auchincloss. The novel's narrator—Louis de Rouvroy, the second Duc de Saint-Simon—was a real-life French noble who observed life at the court and recorded in his memoirs all that he saw and felt about the reign of the Sun King. Saint-Simon (1675–1755) is mentioned in many of Auchincloss’ works and in The Cat and the King he fantasizes that the Duc kept on writing after his real-life memoirs were published.

== Synopsis ==
Mixing fact and fiction, the Duc de Saint-Simon recounts three episodes in which he and his wife involve themselves in the notorious schemings of King Louis XIV's Versailles. Throughout, the famous courtier's attitudes toward the King and court shift. In the first story, the young Duc, appalled at the King's calculating matches of his illegitimate offspring with prominent aristocrats, works to subvert the wedding of one of Louis' nephews, but is thwarted when his adversaries threaten to expose the homosexuality of both the King's brother and the narrator's patron, the Prince de Conti. In the second, Saint-Simon is maneuvered into acting as messenger between Conti (who is briefly King of Poland in 1697) and Conti's mistress, Madame la Duchesse. In this the Duc is subverted by his own wife's schemings. Finally, in later years, rumors of incest are deployed by both sides in a struggle to determine which of two ill-pedigreed "princesses" will be matched with one of the King's legitimate grandsons. The high-minded Saint-Simon emerges from these intrigues disillusioned ("We had all...been made part of the Versailles system"), but resolves (after the King's death) to record the monarch's "great style" and quest for glory.
