= The Keepers of the House =

1964 novel by Shirley Ann Grau

- First edition
- Author: Shirley Ann Grau
- Language: English
- Publisher: Alfred A. Knopf
- Publication date: 1964
- Publication place: United States
- Media type: Print (hardback & paperback)
- Pages: 309

The Keepers of the House is a 1964 novel by American author Shirley Ann Grau set in rural Alabama. It covers seven generations of the Howland family that lived in the same house and developed a community around themselves. Through these characters, the novel examines the long-established white families of the Deep South of the United States, their responses to changing social values and norms, and the hypocrisy of racism. In 1965, The Keepers of the House was awarded the Pulitzer Prize for Fiction.

== Plot summary ==
The first William Howland served in New Orleans and the South during the War of 1812. While returning home to Tennessee, he decided to settle in Mississippi Territory (now Alabama and Mississippi), overlooking a small river. He was later killed in a raid by Indians, likely Creek. Since then, a descendant of William Howland, most often a male named William, has lived in the house with his family and dominated affairs in Madison City and Wade County, which developed around Howland's original settlement.

The fifth William Howland was the last man bearing the name to live in the house. His wife died young, leaving him with a young daughter, Abigail, and an infant son, William, who died a year after his mother. Abigail married an English professor who abandoned her with a child, also named Abigail, when he went off to fight in World War II. When she died, William Howland was left to take care of his granddaughter Abigail. He also brought Margaret, a new African-American housekeeper, to the house to live with him. Throughout the county, she was known as his mistress and the mother of his other children. What no one knew, however, was that William had secretly married Margaret to ensure that the children were legitimate. Once their children came of age, William Howland and Margaret sent them north so that they could pursue lives as Whites.

The secret of the marriage came out only after the younger Abigail was married to John Tolliver, an up-and-coming politician, who was running for governor. In the turbulent racist atmosphere of the South, Tolliver aligned himself with the Klan and made racist statements against Blacks. This infuriated Robert Howland, the eldest son of William and Margaret, who was living in obscurity in Seattle. He released the story of his origins to the press, crippling Tolliver's campaign. Tolliver, who regarded Abigail as a trophy wife, declared that their marriage was over and headed north to his family.

Both William Howland and Margaret had died, but a mob gathered to vent its anger about the mixed marriage on Abigail and the Howland house. They kill the livestock and set fire to the barn, but Abigail succeeds in driving them away from the house with her grandfather's shotguns.

At the end of the book, Abigail takes her revenge on the people of Madison City. Over the past generations, her family had come to own most of the county, making her one of the richest people in the state. Over the course of a single day, she takes revenge on the locals for betraying her grandfather by shutting down the hotel and bringing most of the local economy to ruin. Once she has done that, she places a call to Robert, with the intention of informing his new family that his mother was Black.

== Major themes ==
Race is explored as a major theme throughout the novel. Grau illustrates what she regards as hypocrisy among Southerners, whose purported beliefs about race sometimes conflict with their actions and/or statements. This dissonance is reflected in the character, John Tolliver, who is challenged about whether he believes the racist rhetoric he spouts.

== Reception ==
Grau's bitter condemnation of racist rhetoric, made at the height of campaigns of the Civil Rights Movement in Alabama, evoked a sharp public reaction against the author. When the book was first published, Grau was publicly attacked by the Ku Klux Klan, and a cross was burned on her lawn in Metairie, Louisiana, where she had long lived near New Orleans.
