= Christopher Dahl (administrator) =

American academic administrator (born 1946)

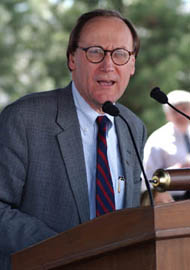
Dahl delivers an address at SUNY Geneseo.

Christopher Dahl (born August 26, 1946) served as president of the State University of New York at Geneseo from 1996 to 2014. He was the 12th person to hold the college presidency and was preceded by Carol Harter and succeeded by Denise Battles.

Dahl was born in Brattleboro, Vermont. He earned an A.B. in English from Harvard College in 1968 and a Ph.D. in English Literature from Yale University in 1978. His dissertation research was on the Victorian periodical. In addition to many scholarly articles, Dahl published a book on author and lawyer Louis Auchincloss, which one reviewer called "the first full-length critical study" of Auchincloss's work. Dahl represents Geneseo as a board member of the American Council on Education. Previously, he served on the boards of the Association of American Colleges and Universities and the Council of Public Liberal Arts Colleges (COPLAC).

Throughout his presidency, Dahl remained very active in campus life and even taught an undergraduate course on the British Romantics every other fall semester.

On March 14, 2013, Dahl announced his retirement as Geneseo's President, effective June 30, 2014.
