= The Double Dealer (magazine) =

1920s literary magazine

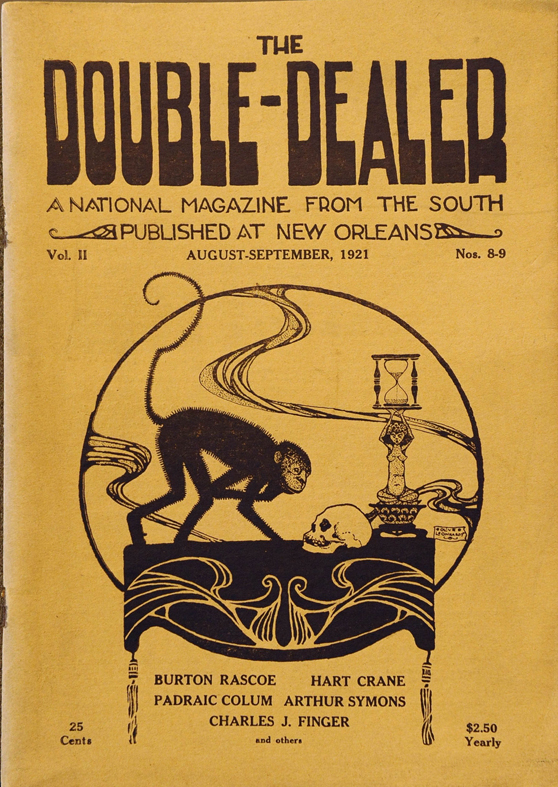
- Cover of the August–September 1921 edition of The Double-Dealer by Olive Leonhardt
- Categories: Creative writing Poetry; Non-fiction; Fiction
- Frequency: monthly
- Founder: Julius Weis Friend (editor); Basil Thompson, Albert Goldstein, John McClure (associate editors)
- Founded: January 1921
- Final issue: May 1926
- Country: United States
- Based in: New Orleans, La.
- Language: English

The Double Dealer was a short-lived but influential New-Orleans–based literary journal of the 1920s.

== Founders ==
The Double Dealer was established in 1921 as a platform for contemporary Southern writers of a modernist bent. Its founders were cultural critic Julius Weis Friend (editor) and Basil Thompson, Albert Goldstein, and John McClure (associate editors). The magazine's title came from a William Congreve play of the same name, which Thompson and Friend admired for its acute dissection of human nature. They saw their ideal reader as someone with a tolerant understanding of "the devious ways of the world".

Loyola University New Orleans preserves the personal papers of Basil Thompson, which contain correspondence, manuscripts, and other materials related to The Double Dealer.

== Modernism ==
With its subtitle A National Magazine for the South, The Double Dealer positioned itself to combat a popular stereotype of Southern literature as a provincial and second-rate "Sahara of the Bozart," as H. L. Mencken termed it in a notorious 1917 essay. In a piece entitled "New Orleans, The Double Dealer and the Modern Movement in America", Sherwood Anderson laid out the editors' vision of a modernism that operates not only at a national level but also embraces the cultural individuality of regions like the South. In pursuit of its inclusive vision, The Double Dealer published African-American authors, and an unusually high proportion of its writers were women.

== Writers ==
The Double Dealer was published monthly from January 1921 to May 1926, during what has been called the first golden age of little magazines. Described as "an incubator of local literary culture and a conduit of Modernism," it featured work by a who's who of American writers, including William Faulkner, Robert Penn Warren, Allen Tate, Amy Lowell, Ernest Hemingway, Djuna Barnes, Carl Van Vechten, Babette Deutsch, Thornton Wilder, Hart Crane, and others. The magazine was one of the first to publish Faulkner (in 1922), and editor John McClure remained a Faulkner friend and sponsor for years after the magazine folded. Although it only lasted five years, The Double Dealer influenced later journals that championed Southern literature: The New Orleanian (established 1930), The Southern Review (est. 1935), Iconograph (est. 1940), and Double Dealer Redux (est. 1993 and published by the Faulkner Society).
