= Shirley Ann Grau =

American writer (1929–2020)

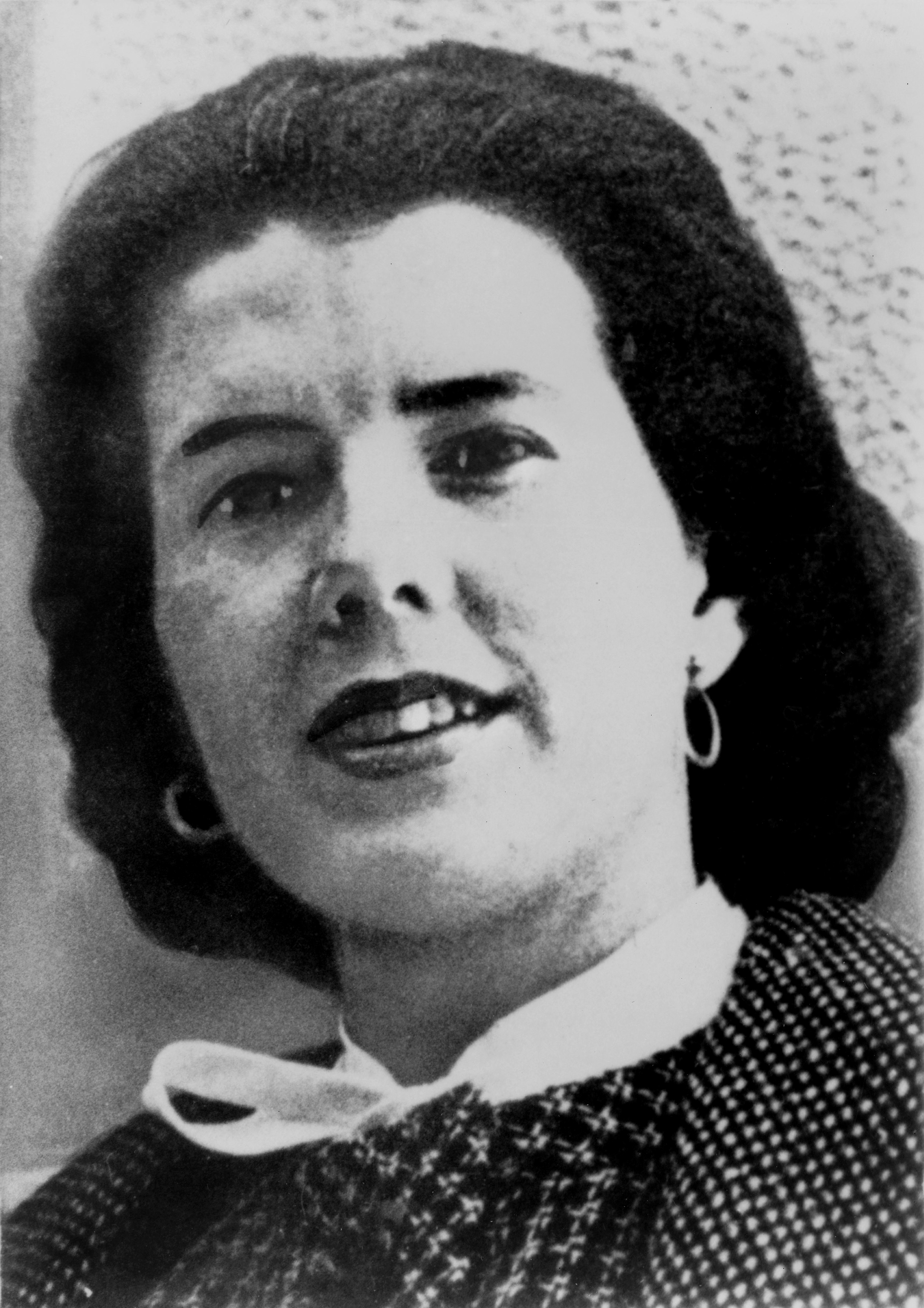
- Grau in 1965
- Born: July 8, 1929; New Orleans, Louisiana, U.S.
- Died: August 3, 2020 (aged 91); Kenner, Louisiana, U.S.
- Education: Tulane University (BA)
- Occupation: Writer
- Spouse: James Feibleman (m. 1955; died 1987)
- Children: 4
- Writing career
- Years active: 1955–2006
- Notable work: The Keepers of the House
- Notable awards: Pulitzer Prize for Fiction; 1965

Shirley Ann Grau (July 8, 1929 – August 3, 2020) was an American writer. Born in New Orleans, she lived part of her childhood in Montgomery, Alabama. Her novels are set primarily in the Deep South and explore issues of race and gender. In 1965 she won the Pulitzer Prize for Literature for her novel The Keepers of the House, set in a fictional Alabama town.

== Early life ==
Grau was born in New Orleans, Louisiana, on July 8, 1929. Her father was a dentist; her mother was a housewife. She grew up in and around Montgomery and Selma, Alabama, with her mother. She graduated in 1950 Phi Beta Kappa with a B.A. degree from Newcomb College, the women's coordinate college of Tulane University.

== Career ==
Grau's first collection of stories The Black Prince was nominated for the National Book Award in 1956. Nine years later, her novel The Keepers of the House was awarded the 1965 Pulitzer Prize for Fiction. It deals with an interracial marriage that was illegal, and the implications of the mixed-race children later passing as white.

The morning she was called about the Pulitzer Prize, she thought it was a practical joke from a friend whose voice she thought she recognized. "'I was awfully short-tempered that morning because I'd been up all night with one of my children,' Grau said ... 'So, I said to the voice I mistook, "yeah and I'm the Queen of England too," and I hung up on him.'" The Pulitzer Prize committee member did not give up and called her publisher Alfred A. Knopf. "The news got to me, but that was very embarrassing."

== Themes ==
Grau's writing explores issues of death, destruction, abortion, and miscegenation, frequently set in historical Alabama or Louisiana. Although she did not restrict her writing to the Deep South or stories about women, she is recognized as an important writer in the fields of women's studies, feminist literature, and Southern literature.

== Personal life ==
In 1955 Grau married James Feibleman, a fellow writer and a professor of philosophy at Tulane University. The pair were introduced by Grau's friend, a student of Feibleman. She legally changed her surname to his but retained her maiden name when writing. Together, they had four children—two sons (Ian and William) and two daughters (Nora and Katherine). The family settled in Metairie, on the outskirts of New Orleans. They were still married when he died in 1987. Grau died on August 3, 2020, at a retirement home in Kenner, Louisiana. She was 91 and had suffered from complications of a stroke.

== Bibliography ==
- The Black Prince, and Other Stories (short stories; 1955) ISBN 978-0394417066
- The Hard Blue Sky (1958) ISBN 978-0807126905
- The House on Coliseum Street (1961) ISBN 978-0807121016
- The Keepers of the House (1964) ISBN 978-1400030743
- The Condor Passes (1971) ISBN 978-1412812504
- The Wind Shifting West (short stories; 1973) ISBN 978-0394488905
- Evidence of Love (1977) ISBN 978-0394411156
- Nine Women (short stories; 1986) ISBN 978-0394548456
- Roadwalkers (1994) ISBN 978-0679432333
- Selected Stories (2006) ISBN 9780807128831
