= Louis Auchincloss =

American lawyer, novelist and historian (1917–2010)

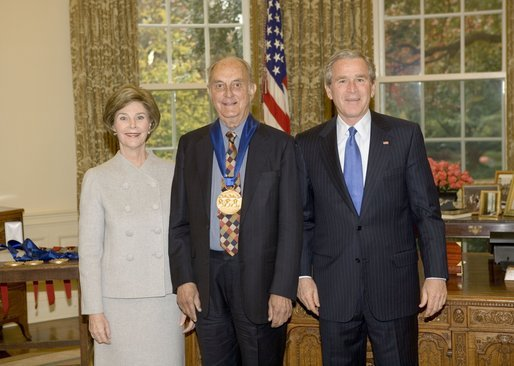
- Auchincloss receiving the National Medal of Arts from President Bush in 2005
- Born: Louis Stanton Auchincloss; September 27, 1917; Lawrence, Nassau County, New York, U.S.
- Died: January 26, 2010 (aged 92); New York City, U.S.
- Education: Yale University; University of Virginia
- Occupations: Writer, lawyer
- Spouse: Adele Lawrence
- Children: 3
- Relatives: Nina Auchincloss Straight (cousin)
- Writing career
- Language: English
- Notable awards: National Medal of Arts (2005)

Louis Stanton Auchincloss (/ˈɔːkɪŋklɒs/; September 27, 1917 – January 26, 2010) was an American lawyer, novelist, historian and essayist. He is best known as a novelist who parlayed his experiences into books exploring the experiences and psychology of American polite society and old money.

His dry, ironic works of fiction continue the tradition of Henry James and Edith Wharton, both of whom he much admired. Auchincloss told Ron Martinetti of American Legends website: "I have first editions of Edith Wharton around me as I write. I gave a hundred of her letters that I collected over the years to Yale. Her prose is as lucid and polished as any in American fiction. I admire James enormously. There is not a word of his I haven’t read. [James] is the great American writer of all time."

Auchincloss wrote his novels initially under the name Andrew Lee, the name of an ancestor who cursed any descendant who drank or smoked.

== Early life ==
Born in Lawrence, New York, Louis was the son of Priscilla Dixon (née Stanton) and Joseph Howland Auchincloss. His brother was Howland Auchincloss and his paternal grandfather, John Winthrop Auchincloss, was the brother of Edgar Stirling Auchincloss (father of James C. Auchincloss) and Hugh Dudley Auchincloss (father of Hugh D. Auchincloss, Jr.).

He grew up among the privileged people about whom he would write, although, as he put it, "There was never an Auchincloss fortune ... each generation of Auchincloss men either made or married its own money".

He attended St. Bernard's School, Groton School and Yale University, where he was editor of the Yale Literary Magazine. Although he did not complete his undergraduate studies at Yale, he was admitted to and attended law school at the University of Virginia. He graduated in 1941 and was admitted to the New York bar the same year.

== Career ==
Auchincloss was an associate at Sullivan & Cromwell from 1941 to 1951 (with an interruption for war service from 1942 to 1945 in the United States Navy during World War II, which might have inspired his 1947 novel The Indifferent Children). He applied to join the Naval Reserve as an intelligence specialist on December 4, 1940, and was appointed as a lieutenant on December 1, 1942.

After taking a break to pursue full-time writing, Auchincloss returned to working as a lawyer, first as an associate (1954–58) and then as a partner (1958–86) at Hawkins, Delafield and Wood in New York City as a wills and trusts attorney, while writing at the rate of a book a year.

=== Literary career ===
Auchincloss is known for his closely observed portraits of old New York and New England society. Among his books are the multi-generational sagas The House of Five Talents (1960), Portrait in Brownstone (1962), and East Side Story (2004). The Rector of Justin (1964) is the tale of a renowned headmaster of a prep school like the one he attended, Groton School, trying to deal with changing times.

In the early 1980s, Auchincloss produced three novels which were not centered on the New York he knew so well, i.e. The Cat and the King, set in Louis XIV's Versailles; Watchfires, concerned with the American Civil War; and Exit Lady Masham, set in Queen Anne's England. Auchincloss would remain close to New York again, however, in his later fiction writing.

Gore Vidal said of his work: "Of all our novelists, Auchincloss is the only one who tells us how our rulers behave in their banks and their boardrooms, their law offices and their clubs ... Not since Dreiser has an American writer had so much to tell us about the role of money in our lives."

== Personal life ==
In 1957, Auchincloss married Adele Burden Lawrence (1931–1991), the daughter of Florence Irvin (née Burden) Lawrence and Blake Leigh Lawrence. Her grandfather was prominent industrialist James A. Burden Jr. and her great-grandmother was Vanderbilt heiress Emily Thorn (née Vanderbilt) Sloane White. Adele was an artist, environmentalist and later became a deputy administrator of the New York City Parks and Recreation Department. Together they had three children:

- Andrew Sloan Auchincloss, a lawyer who married Tracy Lee Ehrlich in 1999.
- John Winthrop Auchincloss II, a lawyer who married Dr. Tracy Pennoyer, daughter of lawyer Robert Morgan Pennoyer, and sister of architect Peter Pennoyer (both great-grandchildren of J.P. Morgan Jr.), in April 1988.
- Blake Leigh Auchincloss, an architect who married in Lauren Stewart Moores, a daughter of John Duer Moores Jr., in June 1988.

He was president and chairman of the Museum of the City of New York and chairman of the City Hall Restoration Committee and was a member of the Century Association and the American Academy of Arts and Letters, where he served as president.

On January 26, 2010, Auchincloss died from complications of a stroke at Lenox Hill Hospital in New York City. He was 92.

=== Politics ===
In his youth, Auchincloss was a "a Roosevelt-hating conservative." Once, while attending Yale, he waved a sunflower (the symbol of Republican Alf Landon) at President Roosevelt's passing motorcade. Auchincloss wrote conservative articles in Virginia Law Review, which have been described as expressing "a nostalgic and romantic idealism".

In his adult life, Auchincloss was a registered Republican. However, he voted for Democrat Bill Clinton explaining, "I think we're moving dangerously into a have and have not situation ... for the first time in 150 years the rich are sneering at the poor."

Auchincloss described the Bush family as "a big family of shits." He explained his decision to receive the National Medal of the Arts from President George W. Bush, saying, "I didn't accept a prize from George W. Bush, I accepted a prize from the President of the United States. Who am I to turn that down?"

=== Awards and legacy ===
Significant collections of Auchincloss's papers reside at the Albert and Shirley Small Special Collections Library at the University of Virginia and at the Beinecke Library at Yale University. In addition, he was the recipient of the following awards and accolades:

- National Book Award Finalist (1960, 1961, 1965, 1967)
- Member, American Academy of Arts and Letters (1965)
- Honorary degree, New York University (Litt.D., 1974)
- Honorary degree, Pace University (1979)
- President, American Academy of Arts and Letters (19??)
- Honorary degree, The University of the South (1986)
- Fellow of the American Academy of Arts and Sciences (1997)
- "Living Landmark" status (2000), New York Landmarks Conservancy
- National Medal of Arts (2005)

== Works ==
Auchincloss wrote more than 60 books.

=== Novels ===
- The Indifferent Children (1947)
- Sybil (1952)
- A Law for the Lion (1953)
- The Great World and Timothy Colt (1956)
- Venus in Sparta (1958)
- Pursuit of the Prodigal (1959): National Book Award Finalist
- The House of Five Talents (1960): National Book Award Finalist
- Portrait in Brownstone (1962)
- The Rector of Justin (1964): National Book Award Finalist
- The Embezzler (1966): National Book Award Finalist
- A World of Profit (1968)
- I Come as a Thief (1972)
- The Partners (1974)
- The Dark Lady (1977)
- The Country Cousin (1978)
- The House of the Prophet (1980)
- The Cat and the King (1981)
- Watchfires (1982)
- Exit Lady Masham (1983)
- The Book Class (1984)
- Honourable Men (1986)
- Diary of a Yuppie (1987)
- The Golden Calves (1988)
- Fellow Passengers: A Novel in Portraits (1989)
- The Lady of Situations (1990)
- Three Lives (1993)
- The Education of Oscar Fairfax (1995)
- Her Infinite Variety (2000)
- The Scarlet Letters (2003)
- East Side Story (2004)
- The Headmaster's Dilemma (2007)
- Last of the Old Guard (2008)

=== Story Collections ===
- The Injustice Collectors (1950)
- The Romantic Egoists (1954)
- Powers of Attorney (1963)
- Tales of Manhattan (1967)
- Second Chance: Tales of Two Generations (1970)
- The Winthrop Covenant (1976)
- Narcissa and Other Fables (1982)
- Skinny Island: More Tales of Manhattan (1987)
- False Gods (1992)
- Tales of Yesteryear (1994)
- The Collected Stories of Louis Auchincloss (1994)
- The Atonement and Other Stories (1997)
- The Anniversary and Other Stories (1999)
- Manhattan Monologues (2002)
- The Young Apollo and Other Stories (2006)
- The Friend of Women and Other Stories (2007)

=== Nonfiction ===
- Reflections of a Jacobite (1961)
- Pioneers and Caretakers: A Study of Nine American Women Novelists (1965)
- On Sister Carrie (1968)
- Motiveless Malignity (1969)
- Edith Wharton: A Woman in Her Time (1972)
- Richelieu (1972)
- A Writer's Capital (1974)
- Reading Henry James (1975)
- Life, Law, and Letters: Essays and Sketches (1979)
- Persons of Consequence: Queen Victoria and Her Circle (1979)
- False Dawn: Women in the Age of the Sun King (1985)
- The Vanderbilt Era: Profiles of a Gilded Age (1989)
- Love without Wings: Some Friendships in Literature and Politics (1991)
- The Style's the Man: Reflections on Proust, Fitzgerald, Wharton, Vidal, and Others (1994)
- The Man Behind the Book: Literary Profiles (1996)
- Woodrow Wilson (Penguin Lives) (2000)
- Theodore Roosevelt (The American Presidents Series) (2002)
- A Voice from Old New York: A Memoir of My Youth (2010)

== Adaptations ==
- The Great World and Timothy Colt (1956) was adapted for television in an episode of the Climax! series (Season 4, Episode 22; Broadcast 27 March 1958)
- Composer Paul Reif adapted Portrait in Brownstone into an opera upon which he was working at the time of his death; it has remained unperformed.
