= History of conservatism in the United States =

Conservatism in the United States is different from other forms of conservatism throughout the Western world. In the United States, the two major national political parties, Republicans and Democrats, have both historically supported republicanism and the classical liberal ideals on which the country was founded during the American Revolution and Revolutionary War, including liberty, the pursuit of happiness, rule of law, consent of the governed, fear of corruption, and equal rights before the law. Political divisions inside the United States have historically been seen as comparatively minor compared to those in Europe, where the divide between the Left and the Right led to violent political polarization, starting with the French Revolution.

While European conservatism historically has been supportive or associated with monarchy, an established church, or a hereditary aristocracy, these ideals have never been supported by American conservatives, who historically have opposed utopian ideas of progress. As Patrick Allitt, a historian at Emory University, wrote in 2009, the primary difference between conservatives and liberals in the U.S. is not one of policy but of attitude.

Unlike Canada and the United Kingdom, where national political parties carry the name "Conservative Party", no major U.S. political party is similarly named. The Conservative Party of Virginia, founded in 1867, elected members to the U.S. House of Representatives from Maryland and North Carolina. Since 1962, there has been a small Conservative Party of New York State. Following the American Civil War in the late 1860s, the former Whigs formed a Conservative Party in several Southern states, but they soon merged into state based Democratic parties.

== Colonial era ==
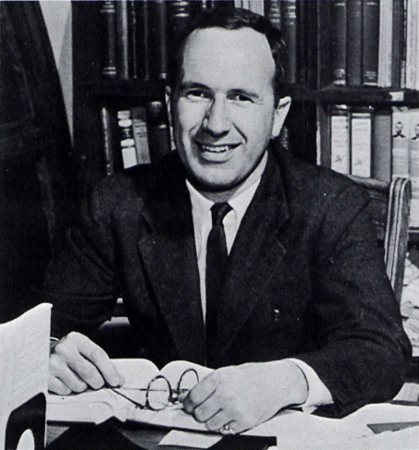
"There is a certain unity, if not always a conscious continuity, in the loose succession of groups and movements that have been styled 'conservative'", Cornell University historian Clinton Rossiter wrote in his 1962 book, Conservatism in America.

During the colonial era of the United States from the 15th century through the American Revolution in the 18th century, Americans rarely referred to themselves as political conservatives. However, many used conservative as an adjective, as in, "I take a conservative view of this issue". Nevertheless, historians have noted the existence of a conservative tradition throughout the history of the United States. Clinton Rossiter, a Cornell University historian and political scientist, wrote in 1962 that, "there is a certain unity, if not always a conscious continuity, in the loose succession of groups and movements that have been styled 'conservative'".

Rossiter identifies three colonial era conservative movements. The first was the Puritan oligarchy, which led early Massachusetts and Connecticut and included such men as John Winthrop, John Davenport, John Cotton, Nathaniel Ward, John Eliot, William Stoughton, Samuel Willard, and the Mather family. Their political philosophy held:

- man's depravity
- natural inequality of all men and inevitable existence of social classes
- the state should be led by an ethical aristocracy chosen by and from men with an economic and religious stake in society
- the union of church and state and the government's ability to regulate people's lives for the good order of the community and the salvation of souls
- an emphasis on liberty "to that only which is good, just, and honest"

The second movement was conservative Whiggism. Examples of conservative Whigs include Cadwallader Colden, the De Lancey family of New York, and Richard Bland. Whig ideas dominated colonial politics, and Whig philosophers, such as John Locke (1632–1704) and other apologists of the Glorious Revolution of 1688, were widely read. Conservative Whigs emphasized:

- government by gentry
- a harmonious order of social ranks and classes
- educational institutions that teach respect for tradition
- religious institutions that preach obedience and virtue
- substantial property qualifications for suffrage and office-holding
- the balancing of liberty with the duty to obey legitimate authority
- devotion to the British constitution

The third movement was the Loyalists or Tories of the American Revolution, most of whom were conservative Whigs unwilling to take up arms against the British monarch and King George III during the American Revolutionary War.

Leonard Woods Labaree, a historian at Yale University, writes that the American gentry and the merchant class were generally conservative. According to Labaree, "It was to the interest of both groups to oppose the growing spirit of liberalism, whether it came from frontier farmers or from the unenfranchised artisans of the towns." The gentry and merchant classes dominated colonial government and believed owning property should be a prerequisite for voting. In the colonial debates over paper currency, merchants opposed printing money because it led to depreciation and inflation. Ronald L. Heinemann notes that members of Virginia's planter class held to a traditional social hierarchy:

The tobacco planters and farmers of Virginia adhered to the concept of a hierarchical society that they or their ancestors had brought with them from England. Most held to the general idea of a Great Chain of Being: at the top were God and his heavenly host; next came kings ... who were divinely sanctioned to rule, then a hereditary aristocracy who were followed in descending order by wealthy landed gentry, small, independent farmers, tenant farmers, servants ... Aspirations to rise above one's station in life were considered a sin.

Robert Muccigrosso, a history professor at Hampden–Sydney College, identifies three aspects of colonial conservatism: the churches, the education system, and admiration for the British constitution. Support for established churches, including the Church of England in Southern Colonies and the Congregational churches in the New England Colonies, was a largely conservative impulse in the original Thirteen Colonies. Most colonial ministers believed in a social hierarchy, and they opposed anti-intellectual movements, which they perceived as threatening to order and stability. Nine colonial colleges were founded to teach upper-class gentlemen and future ministers traditional knowledge. Conservatives admired Great Britain's balanced government with power divided between the monarchy, House of Lords (aristocracy), and House of Commons. They believed this system successfully preserved an ordered society and promoted individual liberty.

== Founding ==
=== American Revolution ===
After the French and Indian War (1754–1763), the British government asserted greater control over colonial affairs as it ended its policy of salutary neglect. This interference threatened the power and economic security of the colonial ruling class. Resistance to British policies, specifically taxation without representation, culminated in the American Revolution (1765–1783).

Supporters of the Revolution were known as Whigs or Patriots and were divided between conservatives and radicals. For conservative Patriots, the Revolution was about maintaining the status quo and their rights as Englishmen. Conservatives such as John Dickinson and James Duane attempted to lead the Revolution in a moderate direction that avoided the dangers of mob rule. Thomas Jefferson, Samuel Adams, and Patrick Henry led the radicals. These men used the Revolution to demand greater equality within society.

Opponents of the Revolution were called Loyalists or Tories. Labaree identified eight characteristics of Loyalists that contributed to their conservative opposition to independence. Loyalists:

1. Resisted innovation
2. Held the conviction that resistance to the British government was morally wrong
3. Felt alienated from the Patriot cause when it resorted to violence, such as burning houses and tarring and feathering royal officials
4. Desired to take a middle-of-the-road position and were angry when forced by the Patriots to declare their opposition
5. Had a sentimental attachment to Britain, admiration for the British constitution, and belief in the value of the British connection
6. Were procrastinators who realized that while independence might be inevitable, they would rather postpone it for as long as possible
7. Were cautious and lacked the Patriots' confidence in the future of an independent America
8. Were pessimists who feared that independence would lead to mob rule, anarchy, or tyranny

During the Revolution, hundreds of thousands of Loyalists fled the American colonies. Among them were important figures such as the statesman Joseph Galloway and the minister Jonathan Boucher. Other Loyalists stayed. Samuel Seabury, for example, abandoned politics but became the first bishop of the Episcopal Church. This church appealed to families that still admired hierarchy, tradition, and historic liturgy but had given up their allegiance to the king.

In the 20th century, American conservatives have highlighted the conservative nature of the American Revolution. Russell Kirk considered the Revolution "a conservative reaction, in the English political tradition, against royal innovation". Robert Nisbet stressed the conservative nature of the American Revolution in contrast to the extreme passions and much greater violence of other revolutions, especially the French Revolution. He attributed the Patriots' restraint to the localization of power, religiosity, the absence of anticlericalism, and the relatively open class system made possible by the absence of hereditary aristocrats.

After 1776, the new American conservatism, unlike European conservatism, was not based on inherited rank, landed estates, or loyalty to the Crown or the established Church. Conservative philosopher Frank Meyer points out its resemblance to European liberalism.

David Lefer has emphasized the central role of conservative Founding Fathers in shaping key documents such as the United States Constitution. The Framers of the Constitution were innovative insofar as they were creating a new government and conservative in that they were informed by the "wisdom of the ages and ... the experience of generations". The conservative thought of James Madison and Alexander Hamilton can be seen in The Federalist Papers, a set of essays supporting the Constitution during the debate over its ratification. Both men believed that human nature was imperfect. Federalist No. 51 states:

If men were angels, no government would be necessary. If angels were to govern men, neither external nor internal controls on government would be necessary. In framing a government which is to be administered by men over men, the great difficulty lies in this: you must first enable the government to control the governed; and in the next place oblige it to control itself.

While Madison believed in popular sovereignty, he wanted to prevent the tyranny of the majority. Popular passions needed to be channeled and refined through representatives. The indirect election of U.S. senators complements the direct election of the House of Representatives. The Senate's composition reassured the wealthy minority that the majority would not dispossess them. The Constitution provided an impartial, unelected judicial branch to check popular passions further. Each branch of government would be motivated by self-interest to resist encroachments from the other branches. The separation of powers would further protect against tyranny.

=== Federalists ===
In the wake of the Revolution, the newly formed Federalist Party, dominated by Treasury Secretary Alexander Hamilton, used the presidency of George Washington to promote a strong nation capable of holding its own in world affairs, with a strong army and navy able to suppress internal revolts (such as the Whiskey Rebellion), and a national bank to support financial and business interests. Intellectually, Federalists, while devoted to liberty, held profoundly conservative views attuned to the American character. As Samuel Eliot Morison explained, they believed that liberty is inseparable from union, that men are essentially unequal, that vox populi [voice of the people] is seldom if ever vox Dei [the voice of God], and that sinister outside influences were busy undermining American integrity. Historian Patrick Allitt concludes that Federalists promoted many conservative positions, including the rule of law under the Constitution, republican government, peaceful change through elections, judicial supremacy, stable national finances, credible and active diplomacy, and protection of wealth.

The Federalists were dominated by businessmen and merchants in the major cities and were supportive of the modernizing, urbanizing, financial policies of Hamilton. These policies included the funding of the national debt and also assumption of state debts incurred during the American Revolutionary War (thus allowing the states to lower their own taxes and still pay their debts), the incorporation of a national Bank of the United States, the support of manufactures and industrial development, and the use of a tariff to fund the Treasury. In foreign affairs the Federalists opposed the French Revolution. Under John Adams they fought the "Quasi War" (an undeclared naval war) with France in 1798–99 and built a strong army and navy. Ideologically, the controversy between Jeffersonian Republicans and Federalists stemmed from a difference of principle and style. In terms of style the Federalists distrusted the public, thought the elite should be in charge, and favored national power over state power. Republicans distrusted Britain, bankers, merchants, and did not want a powerful national government. The Federalists—notably Hamilton, were distrustful of "the people", the French, and the Republicans.

==== John Adams ====
Since the 1790s, conservatives have emphasized an identification with the Founding Fathers and the Constitution. Historians of conservative political thought "generally label John Adams as the intellectual father of American conservatism." Russell Kirk points to Adams as the key Founding Father for conservatives, noting that "some writers regard him as America's most important conservative public man." Historian Clinton Rossiter writes:

Here was no lover of government by plutocracy, no dreamer of an America filled with factions and hard-packed cities. Here was a man who loved America as it was and had been, one whose life was a doughty testament to the trials and glories of ordered liberty. Here ... was the model of the American conservative.

Historian A. Owen Aldridge places Adams, "At the head of the conservative ranks in the early years of the Republic and Jefferson as the leader of the contrary liberal current." It was a fundamental doctrine for Adams that all men are subject to equal laws of morality. He held that in society all men have a right to equal laws and equal treatment from the government. However, he added, "no two men are perfectly equal in person, property, understanding, activity, and virtue." Peter Viereck concluded:

Hamilton, Adams, and their Federalist party sought to establish in the new world what they called a "natural aristocracy." [It was to be] based on property, education, family status, and sense of ethical responsibility....Their motive was liberty itself.

=== Democratic-Republicans ===
In the 1790s, Jeffersonian democracy arose in opposition to the Federalist Party, primarily as a response to the fear that Federalists' favoritism toward British monarchism threatened the new republic. The opposition party chose the name "Republican Party". Some historians refer to them as "Jeffersonian Republicans" while political scientists usually use the "Democratic-Republican Party," in order to distinguish them from the modern Republican Party. While "Jeffersonian Democracy" persisted as an element of the Democratic Party into the early 20th century, as exemplified by William Jennings Bryan (1860–1925), and its themes continue to echo in the 21st century. Jeffersonians opposed the further strengthening federal government and the rise of an interventionist judiciary, a concern later shared by conservatives of the 20th century. The next four presidents were Democratic-Republicans.

=== Whigs ===
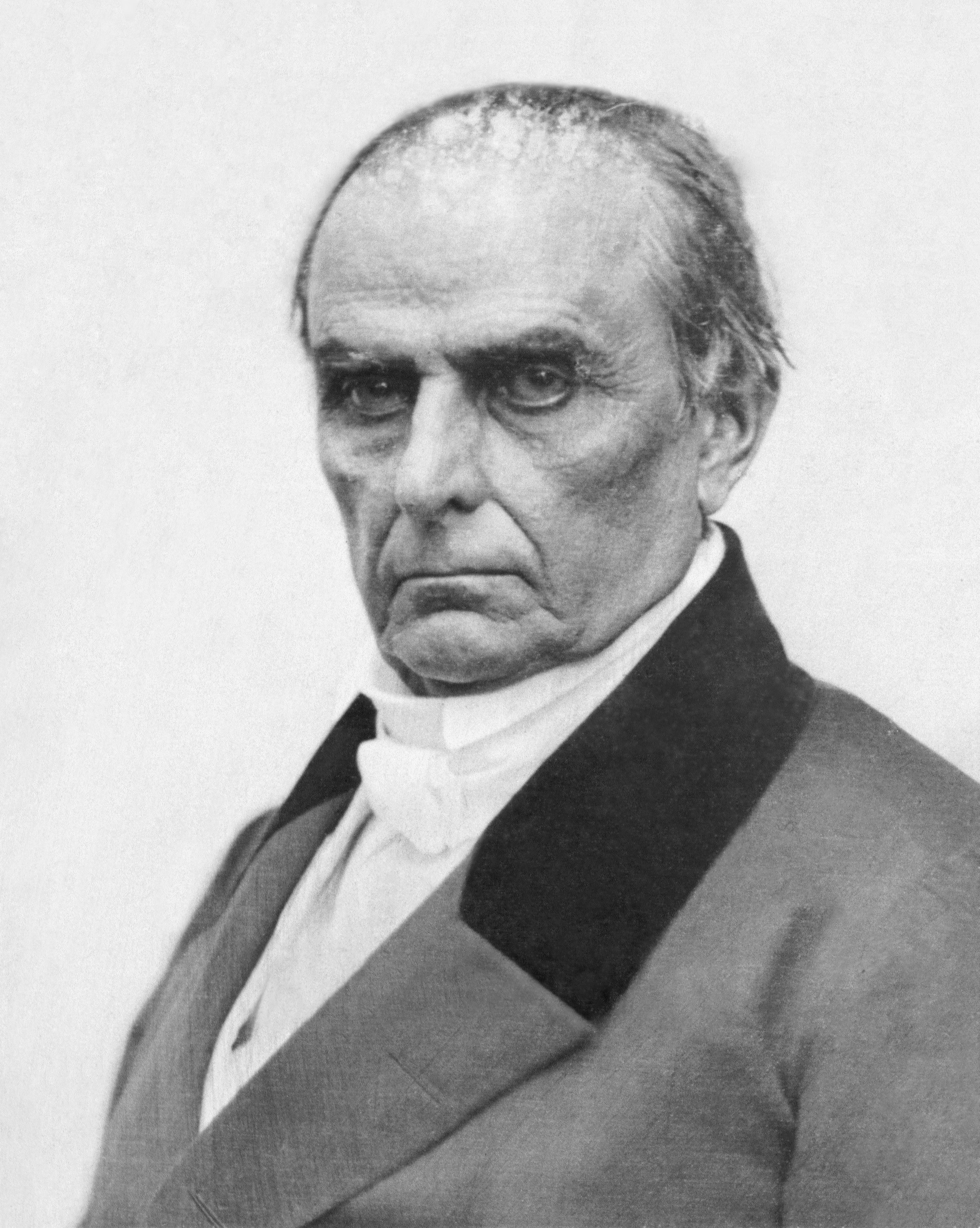
Daniel Webster, a prominent Whig leader

During the 1800s and 1810s, the "Old Republicans" (not to be confused with the Republican Party, which did not yet exist) were led by John Randolph of Roanoke. They refused to form a coalition with the Federalists. Instead they set up a separate opposition led by James Madison, Albert Gallatin, James Monroe, John C. Calhoun and Henry Clay. They nevertheless adopted Federalist principles by chartering the Second Bank of the United States, promoting internal improvements for transportation, raising tariffs to protect factories, and promoting a strong army and navy after the failures of the War of 1812.

By the 1830s, the Whig Party emerged as the national conservative party. Whigs supported the national bank, private business interests, and the modernization of the economy in opposition to Jacksonian democracy, which represented the interests of poor farmers and the urban working class, represented by the newly formed Democratic Party. They chose the name "Whig" because it had been used by patriots in the Revolution. Daniel Webster and other Whig leaders referred to their new political party as the "conservative party", and they called for a return to tradition, restraint, hierarchy, and moderation.

In the end, the nation synthesized the two positions, Federalist and Whig, adopting representative democracy and a strong nation state. By the end of the 1820s, American politics had generally adapted to a two-party system whereby rival parties stake their claims before the electorate, and the winner takes control of the government. As time went on, the Federalists lost appeal with the average voter and were generally not equal to the tasks of party organization; hence, they grew steadily weaker. After 1816, the Federalists had no national influence apart from the Marshall Court. They retained some local support into the 1820s, but important leaders left their fading cause, including future presidents John Quincy Adams and James Buchanan, and future Chief Justice Roger B. Taney.

==== John C. Calhoun ====
John C. Calhoun of South Carolina (1782–1850), at various times a Jeffersonian Republican, a Whig and a Jacksonian Democrat, was always an independent thinker. He moved from a strong nationalist position in the 1810s and 1820s, to a states' rights position emphasizing the rights of minorities (by which he meant white South), and rejecting a powerful central government. Jefferson and Madison in 1798 had developed a theory of nullification that would enable states to reject unconstitutional federal actions. Calhoun picked up the idea and further developed it as a defense against federal attacks on slavery. His ideas were enormously influential among Southern politicians and intellectuals in the decade after his death in 1850; his ideas were often used to promote secession in 1860 as a legal, constitutional escape valve for the South. Brian Farmer says, "Perhaps no figure better exemplifies the attitudes of Southern conservatism in the antebellum period than John C. Calhoun of South Carolina." His ideas were revived by hard-core Southern conservatives in the 20th century. According to Peter Viereck, "this more extreme, very regional Calhoun conservatism still dominates much of the American South in the 1970s."

== American Civil War ==
=== Abraham Lincoln ===
Abraham Lincoln was the first president elected by the newly formed Republican Party, and Lincoln has been an iconic figure for American conservatives.

Historian David Hackett Fischer stresses Lincoln's conservative views. In the 1850s, "Lincoln was a prosperous corporate lawyer, and a member of the conservative Whig party for many years." He promoted business interests, especially banks, canals, railroads, and factories. Before the outbreak of the Civil War, Lincoln explicitly appealed to conservatives. In 1859, he explained what he meant by conservatism in terms of fealty to the original intent of the Founding Fathers:

The chief and real purpose of the Republican party is eminently conservative. It proposes nothing save and except to restore this government to its original tone in regard to this element of slavery, and there to maintain it, looking for no further change in reference to it than that which the original framers of the Government themselves expected and looked forward to."

Lincoln elaborated his position in his famous Cooper Union speech before Republican elites in New York on February 27, 1860. He argued that the Founding Fathers expected slavery to die a natural death, not to spread. His point was that the Founding Fathers were anti-slavery and the notion that slavery was good was a radical innovation that violated American ideals. This speech solidified Lincoln's base in the Republican Party and helped assure his nomination.

During the war, Lincoln was the leader of the moderate Republicans who fought the Radical Republicans on the issues of dealing with slavery and re-integrating the South into the nation. He built the stronger coalition, holding together conservative and moderate Republicans, and War Democrats, against the Radicals who wanted to deny him renomination in 1864. When the war was ending Lincoln planned to reintegrate the white South into the union as soon as possible by offering generous peace terms, "with malice toward none, with charity toward all". But when Lincoln was assassinated, the Radicals gained the upper hand and imposed much harsher terms than those Lincoln had wished.

James Randall is one of many who see Lincoln as holding 19th century classical liberal positions, while at the same time emphasizing Lincoln's tolerance and conservatism "in his preference for orderly progress, his distrust of dangerous agitation, and his reluctance toward ill digested schemes of reform." Randall concluded that Lincoln was "conservative in his complete avoidance of that type of so-called 'radicalism' that involved abuse of the South, hatred for the slaveholder, thirst for vengeance, partisan plotting, and ungenerous demands that Southern institutions be transformed overnight by outsiders." David Greenstone argues that Lincoln's thought was grounded in reform liberalism but notes that his unionism and Whiggish politics had a deeply conservative side as well.

Some liberal historians hold alternative views. According to Striner, "...it is vain to try to classify Lincoln as a clear-cut conservative or liberal, as some historians have tried. He was both, and his politics engendered a long-term tradition of centrism..." .

=== Southern conservatism ===
Historians such as Stephanie Camp have noted the conservatism of the Confederate States of America.

After the Civil War, "conservative" came to mean those who supported the steady racial integration of blacks into American society, but opposed the Radical Republicans who wanted to impose punitive measures against ex-Confederates. Conservative Southerners thought that the radicalism of Northern reformers to empower the freed slaves would cause upheaval if done too quickly. They often accused Northern Carpetbaggers who tried to help freed slaves of corruption. Conservatives opposed the race-based politics in the American South, but given the dominance of the Democratic Party, had to settle on incrementalism. Supremacist Southern Democrats differed from conservatives in their strong support for white supremacy, and insistence on a second-class powerless status for blacks, regardless of the Constitution. Southern conservatives in the 1950s added anti-communism to their agenda, believing that the ideology was poisoning the civil rights movement and the push for integration.

There was also a liberal element in the South—in support of Woodrow Wilson and Franklin D. Roosevelt—but they rarely opposed Jim Crow laws. From 1877 to 1960, the "Solid South" voted for Democratic Party candidates in almost all national elections; Democrats had firm control of state and local government in all Southern states. By the late 1930s conservative Southern Democrats in Congress joined with most Northern Republicans in an informal Conservative Coalition that usually proved decisive in stopping progressive New Deal domestic legislation until 1964. With the Southern strategy of the Republican party in the late 1960s, religious Southern conservatives shifted their support from the Democratic party to the Republican party, forming a very dominant Solid South block of social conservatives in the Republican party. However the Southerners generally were much more internationalist than the mostly isolationist Northern Republicans in the Coalition.

Fundamentalism, especially on the part of Southern Baptists, was a powerful force in Southern conservative politics beginning in the late 1970s. However, they voted for Reagan in 1980 over a fellow Southern Baptist Jimmy Carter.

== Gilded Age ==
There was little nostalgia and backward looking in the dynamic North and West during the Gilded Age, the period in the U.S. history in the late 19th century, from the 1870s to about 1900. Business was expanding rapidly, with manufacturing, mining, railroads, and banking leading the way. There were millions of new farms in the prairie states. Immigration reached record levels. Progress was the watchword of the day. The wealth of the period is highlighted by American upper class opulence, but also by the rise of American philanthropy (referred to by Andrew Carnegie as the "Gospel of Wealth") that used private money to endow thousands of colleges, hospitals, museums, academies, schools, opera houses, public libraries, symphony orchestras, and charities.

Conservatives in the 20th Century, looking back at the Gilded Age, retroactively applied the word "conservative" to those who supported unrestrained Capitalism. For example, Oswald Garrison Villard, writing in 1939, characterized his former mentor Horace White (1834–1916) as "a great economic conservative; had he lived to see the days of the New Deal financing he would probably have cried out loud and promptly demised."

In this sense, the conservative element of the Democratic party was led by the Bourbon Democrats and their hero President Grover Cleveland, who fought against high tariffs and on behalf of the gold standard. In 1896, the Bourbons were overthrown inside the Democratic Party by William Jennings Bryan and the agrarians, who preached "Free Silver" and opposition to the power that banks and railroads had over the American farmer. The agrarians formed a coalition with the Populists and vehemently denounced the politics of big business, especially in the decisive 1896 election, won by Republican William McKinley, who was easily reelected over Bryan in 1900 as well.

Religious conservatives of this period sponsored a large and flourishing media network, especially based on magazines, many with close ties to the Protestant churches that were rapidly expanding due to the Third Great Awakening. Catholics had few magazines but opposed agrarianism in politics and established hundreds of schools and colleges to promote their conservative religious and social values.

Modern conservatives often point to William Graham Sumner (1840–1910), a leading public intellectual of the era, as one of their own, citing his articulate support for free markets, anti-imperialism, and the gold standard, and his opposition to what he saw as threats to the middle class from the rich plutocrats above or the agrarians and ignorant masses below.

The Gilded Age came to an end with the Panic of 1893 and the severe nationwide depression that lasted from 1893 to 1897.

== 1896–1932 ==
=== 1896 realignment ===
The two parties re-aligned in the election of 1896, with the conservative Republicans led by William McKinley becoming the party of business, sound money and assertive foreign policy while the Democratic Party, led by William Jennings Bryan, became the party of the worker, the small farmer, free silver inflationists, populists and anti-imperialism in 1900. Bryan's people took control of the Democratic Party away from the Cleveland Democrats (also called "Bourbon Democrats") at the 1896 Democratic National Convention, where 36-year old Bryan electrified the left by blaming international bankers in New York, London and elsewhere for crucifying mankind upon "a cross of gold." Pietistic Protestants thrilled to Bryan's intensely religious rhetoric. The Republican strategy for a counter crusade was "to join together all conservative forces and brand the crusaders as anarchists, dishonest shallow-brained fools, and thoroughly dangerous fanatics....While Bryan preached the overthrow of evil men, the opposition showed that silver-right panaceas would wreck the economy for decades, deprive factory workers of their livelihood, cheat honest businessmen, and install a wholy un-American regime." The Republican counter-crusade energized conservative Republican farmers and businessmen, and attracted previously Democratic-inclined Lutherans and Catholics, who switched toward McKinley as the sound money conservative choice who rejected radicalism.

The term socialist has long been used as an epithet by conservatives that goes far beyond issues of municipal ownership. Editor William Allen White of Emporia, Kansas, in his famous 1896 editorial on "What's the matter with Kansas" furiously attacked the radicalism of Bryanite Democrats and Populists. Supporters of Republican conservative William McKinley distributed over a million copies to rally opposition to William Jennings Bryan, nominee of both the Democratic and Populist parties. White, according to historian David Hinshaw, used "socialistic" as "his big gun to blast radical opposition."

=== Conservative empire building ===
As the 19th century drew to a close, the United States became an imperial power, with overseas territories in Hawaii, the Philippines, Guam, Puerto Rico, and control over Cuba. Imperialism won out, as the election of 1900 ratified McKinley's policies and the U.S. possession of territories acquired in the Spanish–American War. Theodore Roosevelt promoted the military and naval advantages of the U.S., and echoed McKinley's theme that America had a duty to civilize and modernize the heathen. Bryan made anti-imperialism a centerpiece of his 1900 presidential election campaign, and the Democrats continued the anti-imperialistic tradition, calling for independence for the Philippines until they finally won congressional approval in 1916 that promised eventual independence, which was achieved in 1946. Meanwhile, the imperialistic Republicans lost interest. The supposed business, religious, and military advantages of having an empire proved illusory; by 1908 or so the most ardent conservative imperialists, especially William Howard Taft, and Elihu Root turned their attention to building up an army and navy at home and to building the Panama Canal. They dropped the notion of additional expansion and by 1920, agreed that the Philippines should become independent.

=== Progressive Era ===
In the early years of the 20th century, Republican spokesmen for big business in Congress included Speaker of the House Joe Cannon and Senate Republican Leader Nelson Aldrich of Rhode Island. Aldrich introduced the Sixteenth Amendment, which allowed the federal government to collect an income tax; he also set in motion the design of the Federal Reserve System, which began in 1913. Pro-business conservatives supported many Progressive Era reforms, especially those opposed to corruption and inefficiency in government, and called for purification of politics. Conservative Senator John Sherman sponsored the nation's basic anti-trust law in 1890, and conservatives generally supported anti-trust in the name of opposing monopoly and opening up opportunities for small business. The Efficiency Movement attracted many Progressive Republicans, such as Nelson W. Aldrich and later President Herbert Hoover; with its pro-business, quasi-engineering approach to solve social and economic problems. The issues of Prohibition and woman suffrage split the conservatives.

The "insurgents" were on the Left of the Republican Party. Led by Robert M. La Follette of Wisconsin, George W. Norris of Nebraska, and Hiram Johnson of California, they fought the conservatives in a series of bitter battles that split the GOP and allowed the Democratic Party to take control of Congress in 1910. Teddy Roosevelt, a hawk on foreign and military policy, moved increasingly to the left on domestic issues regarding courts, unions, railroads, big business, labor unions and the welfare state. By 1910–11, Roosevelt had broken bitterly with Taft and the conservative wing of the GOP. In 1911–12 he took control of the insurgency on the left, formed a third party, and ran an unsuccessful campaign for president on the Progressive Party ticket in the 1912 United States presidential election. His departure left the conservatives, led by President William Howard Taft, dominant in the Republican party until 1936. The split opened the way in 1912 for Democrat Woodrow Wilson to become president with only 42% of the vote. The result was that liberalism prevailed for 8 years.

=== World War I ===
The Great War broke out in 1914, with Wilson proclaiming neutrality. Former President Theodore Roosevelt denounced Wilson's foreign policy, charging, 'Had it not been for Wilson's pusillanimity, the war would have been over by the summer of 1916." Indeed, Roosevelt believed that Wilson's approach to foreign policy was fundamentally and objectively evil. Roosevelt abandoned the Progressive Party and campaigned energetically for Republican candidate Charles Evans Hughes, but Wilson's policy of neutrality managed to provide him with a narrow victory in the 1916 election. The GOP, under conservative leadership, went on to regain Congress in 1918 and then the White House in 1920.

=== 1920s ===
Republicans returned to dominance in 1920 with the election of President Warren G. Harding, who ran a campaign that pledged a return to normalcy. Tucker (2010) argues that the 1924 election marked the "high tide of American conservatism," as both major candidates campaigned for limited government, reduced taxes, and less regulation. The opposition was split between Progressive Party candidate Robert M. La Follette who won 17% of the vote, and Democratic John W. Davis who took 29%, which allowed Calvin Coolidge to easily win reelection. Under Coolidge (1923–29), the economy boomed and society stabilized; new policies focused on Americanizing immigrants already living in the United States and restricting the influx of new immigrants into the country.

During 1920s, religious fundamentalists like minister William Bell Riley and William Jennings Bryan, the three-time Democratic presidential nominee, led the battle against the theory of Darwinian Evolution. They considered it false and blasphemous and helped pass laws to make the teaching of evolution in public schools a state crime. The Scopes Trial of 1925 was a nationally publicized challenge to their efforts that largely discredited the movement.

Representative of the 1900–1930 era, was James M. Beck, a lawyer under Presidents Roosevelt, Harding and Coolidge, and a congressman from 1927 to 1933. He espoused conservative principles such as American nationalism, individualism, constitutionalism, laissez-faire economics, property rights, and opposition to reform. Conservatives like Beck saw the need to regulate bad behavior in the corporate world with the intention of protecting corporate capitalism from radical forces, but they were alarmed by the anti-business and pro-union proposals of Roosevelt after 1905. They began to question the notion of a national authority beneficial to big capital, and instead emphasized legalism, concern for the Constitution, and reverence for the American past.

=== Anti-Communism ===
In the wake of the Bolshevik Revolution and the subsequent rise of the Soviet Union, both major American political parties became strongly anti-Communist. Within the U.S., the far Left split and an American Communist Party emerged in the 1920s. Conservatives denounced Communist ideals as a subversion of American values and maintained relentless opposition to Communist principles until the collapse of the Soviet Union in 1991. Conservatives were especially sensitive to the perception of Communist elements trying to change national policies and values in the U.S. government, the media, and academia. Conservatives enthusiastically supported anti-Communist agencies such as the FBI, and were chief proponents of the Congressional investigations of the 1940s and 1950s, particularly those led by Richard Nixon and Joe McCarthy, and were wary of ex-Communists who exposed the system, such as Whittaker Chambers.

=== Writers and intellectuals ===
A tension between mainstream academia and conservatism has been a factor for generations. Richard Hofstadter found that opposition to conservatism has been common among intellectuals since about 1890. Although conservatism built a presence among intellectuals in the late 19th century, historian George Nash wrote in 1996 that, "Despite its new-found status and competitiveness, intellectual conservatism remains a minority movement, especially in the academic community, and, more broadly, amongst the articulate and politically dynamic "new class". However, there were conservative intellectuals inside and out of mainstream academia who during the early and mid-20th century propagated conservative values and shaped the intellectual base of modern conservatism. Prominent among them were Irving Babbitt, Russell Kirk, Henry Adams, Richard M. Weaver, Whittaker Chambers, William F. Buckley Jr, etc. A classic conservative work of the period is Democracy and Leadership (1924) by Irving Babbitt.

Numerous literary figures developed a conservative sensibility and warned of threats to Western Civilization. In the 1900–1950 era Henry Adams, T. S. Eliot, Allen Tate, Andrew Lytle, Donald Davidson, and others feared that heedless scientific innovation would unleash forces that would undermine traditional Western values and lead to the collapse of civilization. Instead they searched for a rationale for promoting traditional cultural values in the face of their fear of an onslaught by moral nihilism based on historical and scientific relativism.

Conservatism as an intellectual movement in the South after 1930 was represented by writers such as Flannery O'Connor and the Southern Agrarians. The focus was on traditionalism and hierarchy.

Numerous former Communist or Trotskyite writers repudiated the Left in the 1930s or 1940s and embraced conservatism, becoming contributors to National Review in the 1950s. They included Max Eastman (1883–1969), John Dos Passos (1896–1970), Whittaker Chambers (1901–1961), Will Herberg (1901–1977), and James Burnham (1905–1987).

Dozens of small circulation magazines aimed at intellectuals promoted the conservative cause in the 20th century.

=== Newspapers ===
Major newspapers in metropolitan centers with conservative editorial viewpoints have played an important part in the development of American conservatism. In the 1930–1960 era, the Hearst chain, and the McCormick family newspapers (especially the Chicago Tribune), and the Los Angeles Times championed most conservative causes, as did the Henry Luce magazines, Time and Fortune. In recent years, those media have lost their conservative edge.

By 1936, most publishers favored Republican Alf Landon over Democratic liberal Franklin Roosevelt. In the nation's 15 largest cities the newspapers that editorially endorsed Landon represented 70 percent of the circulation, while Roosevelt won 69% of the actual voters in those cities. Roosevelt's secret was to open up a new channel of communication to his supporters, through radio. His Fireside Chats especially influenced young radio broadcaster Ronald Reagan, who was an enthusiastic New Dealer at that time. Newspaper publishers continue to favor conservative Republicans.

The Wall Street Journal has continuously been a major voice of conservatism since the 1930s, and remains so since its takeover by Rupert Murdoch in 2007. As editor of the editorial page, Vermont C. Royster (1958–1971), and Robert L. Bartley (1972–2000), were especially influential in providing a conservative interpretation of the news on a daily basis.

== New Deal Era ==
During the 1930s, the beginning of modern conservatism was born with opposition towards the New Deal of President Franklin D. Roosevelt. Conservative (mostly Midwestern) Republicans and Southern Democrats united for the first time, and distinct characteristics of modern conservatism began to appear.

The Great Depression, which followed the Wall Street Crash of 1929 led to price deflation, massive unemployment, falling farm incomes, investment losses, bank failures, business bankruptcies and reduced government revenues. Herbert Hoover's economic policies failed as the depression worsened, and in the 1932 presidential election, Democratic Franklin D. Roosevelt won a landslide victory.

=== Liberty League and the Old Right ===
Roosevelt's New Deal had considerable conservative support at the start, but by 1934 the conservatives started uniting in opposition to the president. The counterattack first came from conservative Democrats, led by presidential nominees John W. Davis (1924) and Al Smith (1928), who mobilized businessmen into the American Liberty League.

Opposition to the New Deal also came from the Old Right, a group of conservative free-market anti-interventionists, originally associated with Midwestern Republicans led by Hoover and, after 1938, by Senator Robert A. Taft of Ohio. Ex-President Hoover moved sharply to the right after 1932, abandoning his earlier Progressivism. He became a leading opponent of FDR and the New Deal. Hoover became a senior statesman of "conservative republicanism" until his death in 1964. His research center, the Hoover Institution, became a major think tank for the right. The Old Right accused Roosevelt of promoting socialism; some noted his upper class status and said he was a "traitor to his class". By 1935, the New Deal strongly supported labor unions, which grew rapidly in membership and power; they became the main target of conservatives.

=== Conservative backlash against Franklin D. Roosevelt ===
Buoyed by his landslide win in 1936, which further reduced the GOP in Congress, Roosevelt in early 1937 astonished the nation by his "court-packing scheme". He called on Congress to add six more justices to the nine on the Supreme Court, which had been overturning New Deal legislations as unconstitutional. Vice President John Nance Garner worked with congressional allies to stop Roosevelt. Many who broke with Roosevelt on the Court issue had been old Progressives such as Senator Burton K. Wheeler of Montana.

Roosevelt was defeated in the Court initiative and fought back by targeting his enemies in the 1938 Democratic primaries. The national economy was in a sharp recession, and widespread labor strikes were making unions highly controversial. Roosevelt failed, as all but one Congressman resisted the "purge". Opposition to Roosevelt doubled among Southern Democratic Congressmen.

=== Conservative coalition forms ===
Senator Josiah Bailey (D-NC) released the "Conservative Manifesto" in December 1937, which marked the launching of the "Conservative coalition" between Republicans and Southern Democrats. The Republicans made nationwide gains in 1938. The Conservative Coalition generally controlled Congress until 1963; no major legislation passed, which the Coalition opposed. Its most prominent leaders were Senator Robert A. Taft (R-OH) and Senator Richard Russell (D-GA).

According to James T. Patterson:

By and large the congressional conservatives by 1939 agreed in opposing the spread of federal power and bureaucracy, in denouncing deficit spending, in criticizing industrial labor unions, and in excoriating most welfare programs. They sought to "conserve" an America which they believed to have existed before 1933.

=== Foreign policy ===
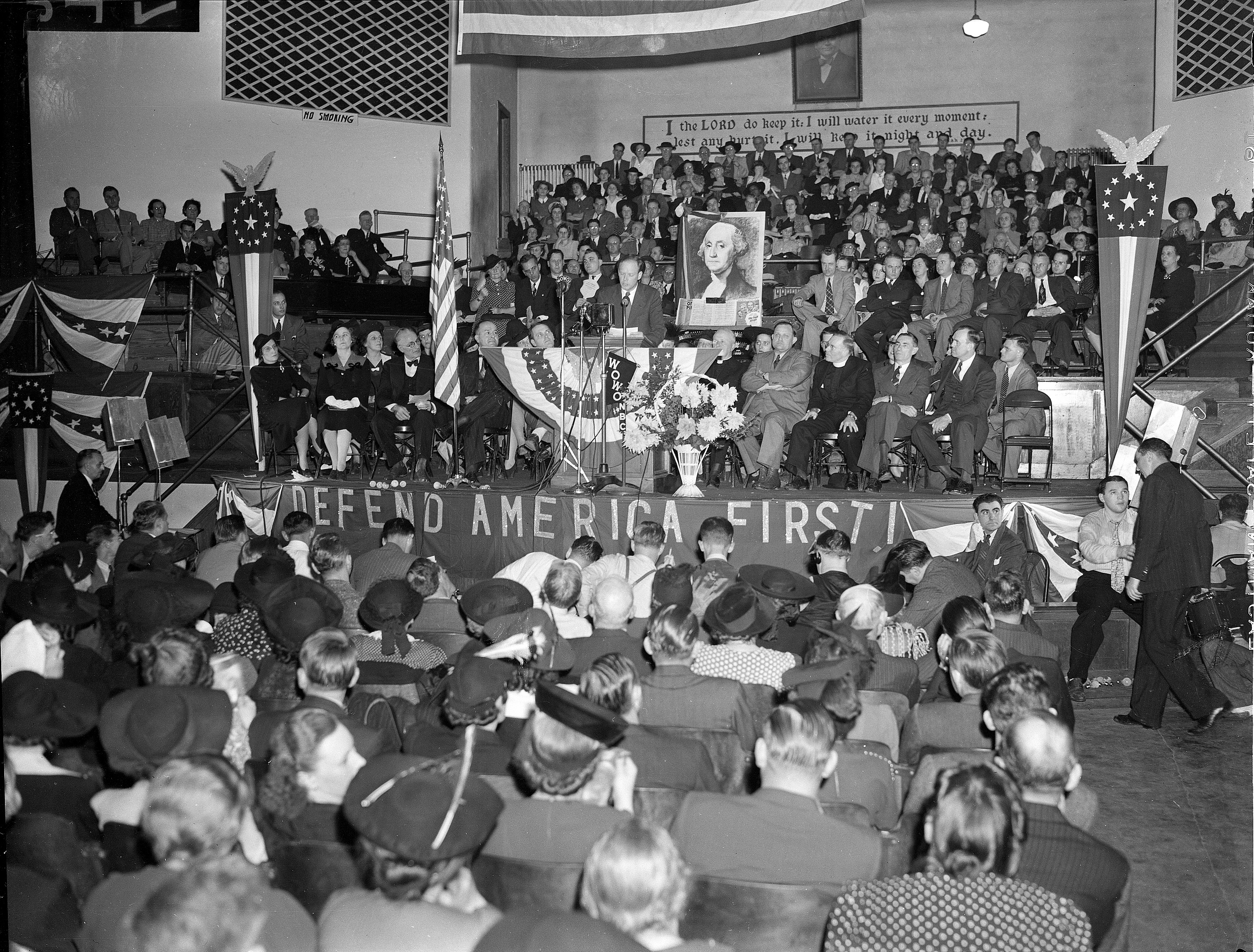
Charles Lindbergh speaking at an America First Committee rally

The conservative coalition was not concerned with foreign policy, as most of the Southern Democrats were internationalists, a position opposed by most Republicans. The key Republican conservative was Senator Robert A. Taft. He unsuccessfully sought the Republican nomination in 1940, 1948, and 1952, and was a staunch isolationist who opposed American membership in NATO (1949) and the fight against Communist expansion in the Korean War (1950). Many conservatives, especially in the Midwest, in 1939–41 favored isolationism and opposed American entry into World War II—and so did some liberals. (see America First Committee). Conservatives in the East and South were generally interventionist, as typified by Henry Stimson. However, the Japanese attack on Pearl Harbor in Dec. 1941 united all Americans behind the war effort, with conservatives in Congress taking the opportunity to close down many New Deal agencies, most notably the WPA.

==== Thomas Jefferson's image ====
Conservatives typically argued their positions, which were derived from the Founding Fathers who formed the United States in the late 18th century. The problem was how to handle Thomas Jefferson—he was a major hero to both left and right, although at different times for different reasons. In the New Deal era of the 1930s, Jefferson's memory became contested ground. Franklin D. Roosevelt greatly admired Jefferson and had the Jefferson Memorial built to honor his hero. Even more dramatic was the reaction of the conservatives as typified by the American Liberty League (comprising mostly conservative Democrats who resembled the Bourbon Democrats of the 1870–1900 era) and the Republican Party. Conservative Republicans abandoned their Hamiltonian views because they led to enlarged national government. Their opposition to Roosevelt's New Deal was cast in explicitly Jeffersonian small-government terms, and Jefferson became a hero of the Right.

== 1945–1951 ==
The modern conservative political movement, combining elements from both traditional conservatism and libertarianism, emerged following World War II, but had its immediate political roots in reaction to the New Deal. Those two branches of conservatism allied post World War I anti-communism thought. They defended a system in which the government should have a limited role to play in individual affairs. Their conceptions of conservatism, though differing slightly from one another, shared an inclination towards the elevation of a universal moral code within society. In the early 1950s, Dr. Russell Kirk defined the boundaries and resting grounds of conservatism. In his book The Conservative Mind (1953), Dr. Kirk wrote ten "truisms" that became major concepts for conservatism philosophy. Another important name in the domain of U.S. conservatism is James Burnham. Mr. Burnham, a philosopher remembered for his political life, unsettled some foundations of conservatism when he, fervent opponent of liberalism, took position in favor of the Conscription.

In another book called Rebels All, Kevin Mattson seeks to define the main goals of Post-War conservatism in the United States. He wrote: "isn't conservatism supposed to be about maintaining standards, upholding civility, and frowning on rebellion?" In addition, looking back at how it has evolved from post World War II to modern times, it seems undeniable that conservatism holds the capacity to defend diverging beliefs such as free-market libertarianism and religious traditionalism while valuing the aggressively anti-communist mind. Modern Conservatism, a highly complex concept, finds its roots in the works of post-World War II thinkers and philosophers whose differing opinions about how to promote similar goals reflect the subjectivity of this political inclination.

In the 1946 United States elections, conservative Republicans took control of Congress and opened investigations into communist infiltration of the federal government under Roosevelt. Congressman Richard Nixon accused Alger Hiss, a senior State Department official, of being a Soviet spy. Based on the testimony of Whittaker Chambers, an ex-Communist who became a leading anti-Communist and hero to conservatives, Hiss was convicted of perjury.

President Harry Truman (1945–1953) adopted a containment strategy against Joseph Stalin's Communist expansion in Europe. Truman's major policy initiatives were through the Truman Doctrine (1947), the Marshall Plan (1948) and NATO (1949). Truman's Cold War policies had the support of most conservatives except for the remaining isolationists. The far left (comprising Communist Party USA members and fellow travelers) wanting to continue détente with Russia, formed the Progressive Party, which followed FDR's vice president Henry A. Wallace in a quixotic crusade in the 1948 presidential election, that failed to win the new party's broad support and, largely destroyed the far left in the Democratic party. Truman was reelected but his vaunted "Fair Deal" went nowhere, as the Conservative Coalition set the domestic agenda in Congress. The Coalition did not play a role in foreign affairs.

In 1947, the conservative coalition in Congress passed the Taft–Hartley Act, balancing the rights of management and unions, and delegitimizing Communist union leaders. However, the major job of rooting out communists from labor unions and the Democratic party was undertaken by liberals, such as Walter Reuther of the United Auto Workers and Ronald Reagan of the Screen Actors Guild (Reagan was a Democrat at that time).

One typical mid-century conservative Republican in Congress was Noah M. Mason (1882–1965), who represented a rural downstate district in Illinois from 1937 to 1962. Less flamboyant and less well known than his colleague Everett McKinley Dirksen, he ardently supported states' rights in order to minimize the federal role, for he feared federal regulation of business. He distrusted Roosevelt, and gave many speeches against high federal spending. He called out New Dealers, such as Eveline M. Burns, Henry A. Wallace, Adolph A. Berle, Jr., and Paul A. Porter, as socialists, and suggested their policies resembled fascism. He fought communism as a member of the House Un-American Activities Committee (1938–43), and in 1950 he championed Joe McCarthy's exposés.

In 1950, Lionel Trilling wrote that conservatives had lost the battle of ideas: "In the United States at this time liberalism is not only the dominant but even the sole intellectual tradition. For it is the plain fact that nowadays there are no conservative or reactionary ideas in general circulation." He likewise wrote: "But the conservative impulse and the reactionary impulse do not, with some isolated and some ecclesiastical exceptions, express themselves in ideas but only in action or in irritable mental gestures which seek to resemble ideas."

=== Anti-Communism ===
In the wake of the Bolshevik Revolution and the subsequent rise of the USSR, both major American political parties became strongly anti-Communist. However the liberal Franklin D. Roosevelt did attract some Communist support 1933–1945, especially after Hitler attacked the USSR in 1941. Within the U.S., the far Left split and an American Communist Party emerged in the 1920s. Most conservatives denounced Communist ideals as a subversion of American values and maintained relentless opposition to Communist principles until the collapse of the Soviet Union in 1991. However, there was a minority—led by Robert Taft—who opposed NATO and wanted to avoid European entanglements. Conservatives were especially sensitive to the perception that Communist elements were trying to change national policies and values in the U.S. government, the media, and academia. Conservatives enthusiastically supported anti-Communist agencies such as the FBI. They were chief proponents of the Congressional investigations of the 1940s and 1950s, particularly those led by Richard Nixon and Joe McCarthy. McCarthy, a Catholic Republican, attracted many conservative Catholic Democrats, including the Kennedy family. Conservatives welcomed ex-Communists who exposed the system, such as Whittaker Chambers.

=== Korean War ===
When the communist North Korea invaded South Korea in 1950, Truman adopted a rollback strategy, planning to free the entire country by force. Truman decided not to obtain Congressional approval for his war—he relied on United Nations approval—which left the Republicans free to attack his war policies. Taft said Truman's decision was "a complete usurpation by the president." Truman's reliance on the UN reinforced conservative distrust of that body. With the Allies on the verge of victory, the People's Republic of China entered the war and drove the United Nations Command back with terrific fighting in sub-zero weather. Truman reversed positions, dropped the rollback policy, and fired the conservative hero General Douglas MacArthur (who wanted rollback), and settled for containment. Truman's acceptance of the status quo cost 37,000 Americans lives and undermined Truman's base of support. Truman did poorly in the early 1952 Democratic Party presidential primaries and was forced to drop his reelection bid. The Democratic Party nominated a liberal intellectual with no ties to Roosevelt or Truman, Illinois Governor Adlai Stevenson II.

=== McCarthyism: 1950–1954 ===
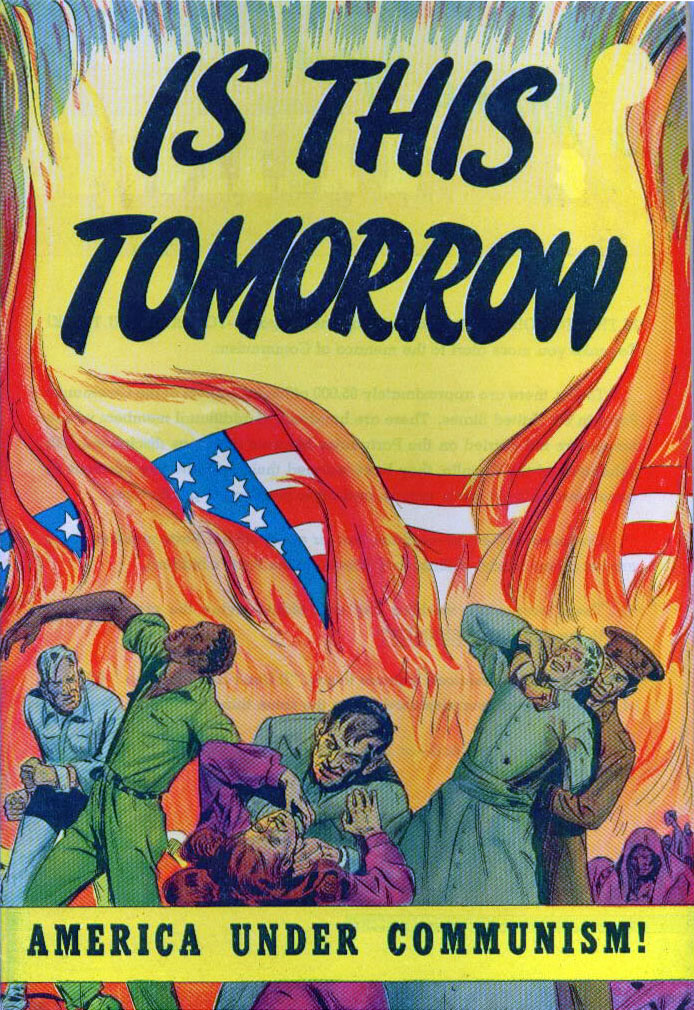
A 1947 booklet published by the Catholic Catechetical Guild Educational Society raising the specter of a Communist takeover

When anxiety over Communism in Korea and China reached a fever pitch, an otherwise obscure Senator, Joe McCarthy of Wisconsin, launched extremely high-visibility investigations into the alleged network of communist spies in the government. Irish Catholics (including Buckley and the Kennedy Family) were intensely anti-communist and supported McCarthy (a fellow Irish Catholic). Paterfamilias Joseph Kennedy (1888–1969), a leading conservative Democrat, was an ardent supporter of McCarthy, and got his son Robert F. Kennedy a job with McCarthy. McCarthy's careless tactics, however, allowed his opponents to effectively counterattack. In 1953, McCarthy started talking of "21 years of treason" and launched a major attack on the Army for promoting a communist dentist in the medical corps. This was too much for Eisenhower, who encouraged Republicans to censure McCarthy formally in 1954. The senator's power collapsed overnight. Senator John F. Kennedy did not vote for his censure.

Arthur Herman states that "McCarthy was always a more important figure to American liberals than to conservatives", because he targeted liberals, making them look like innocent victims. However, in recent years conservatives have defended McCarthy's rough tactics. Espionage work done under the Venona project showed that communist spies were really present in the government, and some of the Left at the time were indeed covering up those communist networks. The most notable recent conservative defense of McCarthy is M. Stanton Evans' 2007 book Blacklisted by History.

== 1950s ==
Examining postwar conservative intellectual history, Kim Phillips-Fein writes:

The most influential synthesis of the subject remains George H. Nash's The Conservative Intellectual Tradition since 1945.... He argued that postwar conservatism brought together three powerful and partially contradictory intellectual currents that previously had largely been independent of each other: libertarianism, traditionalism, and anticommunism. Each particular strain of thought had predecessors earlier in the twentieth (and even nineteenth) centuries, but they were joined in their distinctive postwar formulation through the leadership of William F. Buckley Jr. and National Review. The fusion of these different, competing, and not easily reconciled schools of thought led to the creation, Nash argued, of a coherent modern Right."

As shown by General Dwight D. Eisenhower's defeat of Senator Robert A. Taft for the GOP nomination in 1952, isolationism had weakened the Old Right. Eisenhower won the 1952 election by crusading against what he called Truman's failures: "Korea, Communism and Corruption." Eisenhower quickly ended the Korean War -which most conservatives opposed by then- and adopted a conservative fiscal policy while cooperating with Taft, who became the Senate Majority Leader. As President, Eisenhower promoted "Modern Republicanism", involving limited government, balanced budgets, and curbing government spending. Although taking a firm anti-Communist position, he and Secretary of State John Foster Dulles did not push for rollback and continued the Truman administration's policy of containment. He cut defense spending by shifting the national strategy from reliance on expensive army divisions to cheaper nuclear weapons. Although he made efforts to eliminate expensive supports for farm prices, he was ultimately unsuccessful, but he was able to return offshore oil reserves to the states. Eisenhower kept the regulatory and welfare policies of the New Deal, with the Republicans taking credit for the expansion of Social Security. He also sought to minimize conflict among economic and racial groups in the quest for social harmony, peace and prosperity. He was reelected by a landslide in 1956.

=== Russell Kirk ===
While Republicans in Washington were making small reversals of the New Deal, the most critical opposition to liberalism came from conservative intellectuals. Russell Kirk (1918–1994) claimed that both classical and modern liberalism placed too much emphasis on economic issues and failed to address man's spiritual nature, and called for a plan of action for a conservative political movement regarding this. He claimed that conservative leaders should appeal to farmers, small towns, the churches, and others, following the example of the British Conservative Party.

Kirk adamantly opposed libertarian ideas, which he saw as a threat to true conservatism. In Libertarians: the Chirping Sectaries Kirk wrote that the only thing libertarians and conservatives have in common is a detestation of collectivism. "What else do conservatives and libertarians profess in common? The answer to that question is simple: nothing. Nor will they ever have.".

=== William F. Buckley Jr. and the National Review ===
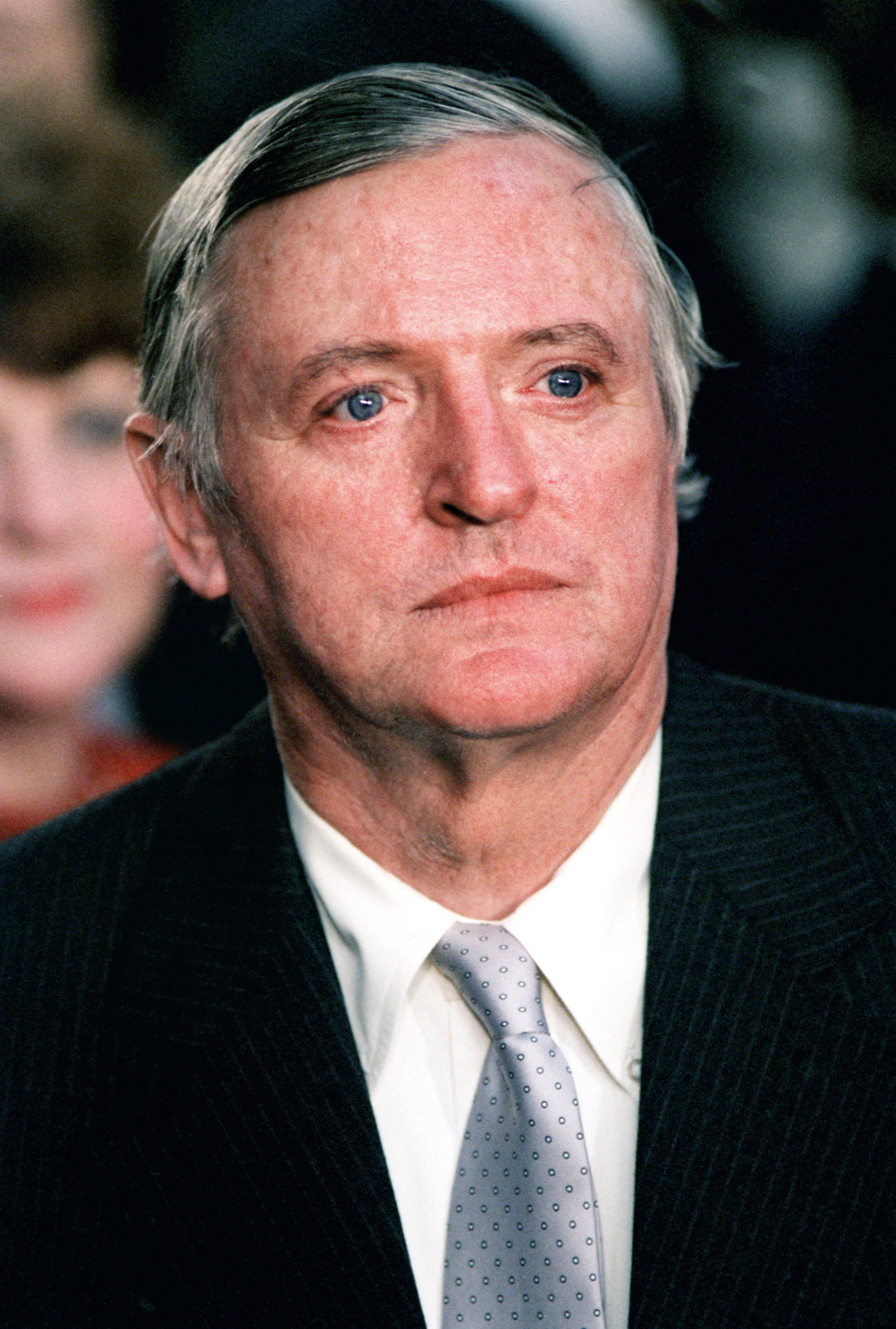
William F. Buckley Jr.

The most effective organizer and proponent of conservative ideas was William F. Buckley, Jr. (1925–2008), the founder of National Review in 1955 and a highly visible writer and media personality. Although before, there had been numerous small right-wing circulation magazines, the National Review was able to gain national attention and shaped the conservative movement due to strong editing and a strong string of regular contributors. Erudite, witty and tireless, Buckley inspired a new enthusiasm for the movement. Behind the scenes the magazine was handled by publisher William A. Rusher. Geoffrey Kabaservice asserts, "...in many ways it was Rusher, not Buckley who was the founding father of the conservative movement as it currently exists. We have Rusher, not Buckley, to thank for the populist, operationally sophisticated, and occasionally extremist elements that characterize the contemporary movement."

Buckley and Rusher assembled an eclectic group of writers: traditionalists, Catholic intellectuals, libertarians and ex-Communists. They included: Russell Kirk, James Burnham, Frank Meyer, Willmoore Kendall, L. Brent Bozell, and Whittaker Chambers. In the magazine's founding statement Buckley wrote:

The launching of a conservative weekly journal of opinion in a country widely assumed to be a bastion of conservatism at first glance looks like a work of supererogation, rather like publishing a royalist weekly within the walls of Buckingham Palace. It is not that of course; if National Review is superfluous, it is so for very different reasons: It stands athwart history, yelling Stop, at a time when no other is inclined to do so, or to have much patience with those who so urge it.

=== Milton Friedman and libertarian economics ===
Austrian economist F. A. Hayek (1899–1992) in 1944 galvanized opponents of the New Deal by arguing that the left in Britain was leading that nation down the "road to serfdom".

More influential was the Chicago school of Economics, led by Milton Friedman (1912–2006) and George J. Stigler (1911–1991), who advocated neoclassical and monetarist public policy. The Chicago School provided a vigorous criticism of regulation, on the grounds that it led to control of the regulations by the regulated industries themselves. Since 1974, government regulation of industry and banking has greatly decreased. The School attacked Keynesian economics, then the dominant theory of economics, which Friedman claimed was based on unsound models. The "stagflation" of the 1970s (combining high inflation and high unemployment) would have been impossible according to Keynesian models, but was predicted by Friedman, giving his approach credibility among the experts.

Alan O. Ebenstein argues that by the late 1960s, Friedman was "the most prominent conservative public intellectual at least in the United States and probably in the world." Friedman advocated for greater reliance on the marketplace in lectures, weekly columns, books, and on television. According to Friedman, Americans should be "Free to Choose". He convinced many conservatives that the practice of military drafting was inefficient and unfair; consequently, Nixon ended it in 1973. Nine Chicago School economists won the Nobel Memorial Prize in Economic Sciences. Their views about deregulation and fiscal policy became widely accepted, following the 1970s and early 1980s recessions. However, Friedman's "monetarism" did not fare as well, with current monetary practice targeting inflation, not the money supply. As an academic economist, Ben Bernanke developed Friedman's argument that the banking crises of the early 1930s deepened and prolonged the depression. As Chairman of the Federal Reserve, Bernanke's energetic reaction to the 2008 financial crisis was based in part on Friedman's warnings about the Fed's inactions after 1929.

=== John Birch Society ===
Robert W. Welch Jr. (1900–1985) founded the John Birch Society as an authoritarian top-down force to combat Communism. It had tens of thousands of members and distributed books, pamphlets and the magazine American Opinion. It was so tightly controlled by Welch that its effectiveness was strictly limited, as it mostly focused on calls to impeach Chief Justice Earl Warren, as well as supporting local police. It became a major lightning rod for liberal attacks. In 1962, Buckley won the support of Goldwater and other leading conservatives for an attack on Welch. He denounced Welch and the John Birch Society in National Review, as "far removed from common sense" and urged the GOP to purge itself of Welch's influence.

=== Frank Meyer and Fusionism ===
The main disagreement between Kirk, described as a traditionalist conservative, and the libertarians was whether tradition and virtue or liberty should be their primary concern. Frank Meyer tried to resolve the dispute with fusionism, which argued that the United States could not conserve its traditions without economic freedom. He also noted that they were united in opposition to "big government" and made anti-communism the glue that would unite them. The term "conservative" was used to describe the views of National Review supporters, despite initial protests from the libertarians, because the term "liberal" had become associated with "New Deal" supporters. They were also later known as the "New Right", as opposed to the New Left.

== 1960s ==
=== South and segregation ===
Despite the popular perception that conservatism is limited to Republicans, during the era of segregation before 1965, some Southern Democrats were also conservative in opposing the desegregationists in their party. Southern Democrats were a key part of a Conservative Coalition that largely blocked New Deal labor legislation in Congress from 1937 to 1963, though they tended to be liberal and voted with the rest of the Democratic Party on other economic issues. Southern Democrats fended off the more conservative Republican Party (GOP) by arguing that only they could defend segregation, because the Republican Party nationally was committed to integration. That argument collapsed when Congress banned segregation in 1964. This provided an opportunity for Republicans to appeal to conservative Southerners on the basis that the GOP was the more conservative party on a wide range of social and economic issues, as well as being hawkish on foreign policy when the antiwar forces gained strength in the Democratic party. Southern conservatives moved from the Democratic Party to the GOP at the presidential level in the 1960s, and at the state and local level after 1990.

=== 1964 Barry Goldwater Presidential Campaign ===
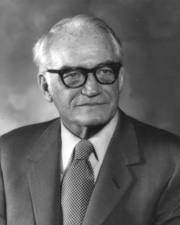
Senator Barry Goldwater

Conservatives united behind the 1964 presidential campaign of Arizona Senator Barry Goldwater (1919–1998), though his campaign was ultimately unsuccessful. Goldwater published The Conscience of a Conservative (1960), a bestselling book that explained modern conservative theory. Goldwater was significantly weakened by his unpopular views regarding Social Security, income tax, and the Vietnam War. In Tennessee, he suggested selling the Tennessee Valley Authority, which was popular with conservatives and liberals in the region. He voted against the Civil Rights Act of 1964, thereby winning the support of Southern segregationists. Support for the campaign came from numerous grassroots activists, such as Phyllis Schlafly and the newly formed Young Americans for Freedom, sponsored by Buckley to mobilize conservatives. Buckley himself tried to win the 1965 New York City mayoral election under the Conservative Party of New York State banner, but failed.

Despite Goldwater's defeat conservatives were rapidly organizing at the local, state, and national levels. They were most successful in suburban California, where they worked hard in the 1966 California gubernatorial election for their new hero Ronald Reagan (1911–2004), who was elected governor for two terms.

== 1970s ==
=== Conservative shift in politics ===
Reagan was the leader of a dramatic conservative shift in American politics that undercut many of the domestic and foreign policies that had dominated the national agenda for decades.

The common thread was a growing distrust of government to do the right thing on behalf of the people. While distrust of high officials had been an American characteristic for two centuries, this was brought to the forefront by the Watergate scandal of 1973–1974, forcing the resignation of President Richard Nixon, who faced impeachment, and resulting in criminal trials for many of his senior associates. The media was energized in its vigorous search for scandals, which deeply impacted both major parties at the national, state and local levels. At the same time there was a growing distrust of long-powerful institutions such as big business and labor unions. The postwar consensus regarding the value of technology in solving national problems, especially nuclear power, came under heavy attack from the New Left.

Conservatives at state and local levels increasingly emphasized the argument that the soaring crime rates indicated a failure of liberal policy in the American cities.

Meanwhile, liberalism was facing divisive issues as the New Left challenged established liberals on such issues as the Vietnam War, while building a constituency on campuses and among younger voters. A "cultural war" was emerging as a triangular battle among conservatives, liberals, and the New Left, involving such issues as individual freedom, divorce, sexuality, and even topics such as hair length and musical taste.

The triumphant issue for liberalism was the achievement of civil rights legislation in the 1960s, which won over the black population and created a new black electorate in the South. However, it alienated many working-class ethnic whites, and opened the door for conservative white Southerners to move into the Republican Party.

In foreign policy, the war in Vietnam was a highly divisive issue in the 1970s. Nixon had introduced a policy of détente in the Cold War, but it was strongly challenged by Reagan and the conservative movement. Reagan saw the Soviet Union as an implacable enemy that had to be defeated, not compromised with. A new element emerged in Iran, with the overthrow of a pro-American government, and the emergence of the stream the hostile ayatollahs. Radical Iranian students seized the American Embassy, and held American diplomats hostage for over a year, underscoring the weaknesses of the foreign policy of Jimmy Carter.

The economic scene was in doldrums, with soaring inflation undercutting the savings ability of millions of Americans, while unemployment remained high and growth was low. Shortages of gasoline and high prices at the local pump made the energy crisis a local reality.

Reagan increasingly dominated the conservative movement, especially in his failed 1976 quest for the Republican presidential nomination and his successful run in 1980.

=== Religious Right ===
An unexpected new factor was the emergence of the religious right as a cohesive political force that gave strong support to conservatism.

By the 1950s, many conservatives emphasized the Judeo-Christian roots of their values. Goldwater noted that conservatives "believed the communist projection of man as a producing, consuming animal to be used and discarded was antithetical to all the Judeo-Christian understandings which are the foundations upon which the Republic stands." Ronald Reagan frequently emphasized Judeo-Christian values as necessary ingredients in the fight against communism. Belief in the superiority of Western Judeo-Christian traditions led conservatives to downplay the aspirations of Third World and to denigrate the value of foreign aid. Since the 1990s, the term "Judeo-Christian" has been primarily used by conservatives.

Evangelicals had been politicized in the 1920s, battling to impose prohibition and to stop the teaching of evolution in the schools (as in the Scopes Trial of 1925), but had largely been politically quiet since the 1930s. The emergence of the "religious right" as a political force and part of the conservative coalition dates from the 1970s and was a response to secularization and Supreme Court rulings on school prayer and abortion. According to Wilcox and Robinson, "The Christian Right is an attempt to restore Judeo-Christian values to a country that is in deep moral decline.... [They] believe that society suffers from the lack of a firm basis of Judeo-Christian values and they seek to write laws that embody those values". Especially important was the hostile reaction to the Roe v. Wade Supreme Court decision legalizing abortion, which brought together Catholics (who had long opposed abortion) and evangelical Protestants (who were new to the issue).

Noting the anger of Catholic bishops at losing state funding because of the Catholic opposition to gay adoptive parents, along with other social issues, The New York Times reported in late 2011:

The idea that religious Americans are now the victims of government-backed persecution is now a frequent theme not just for Catholic bishops, but also for Republican presidential candidates and conservative evangelicals.

=== Neoconservatives ===
The 1970s saw the movement of many prominent liberal intellectuals to the right, many of them from New York City Jewish roots and well-established academic reputations, who had become disillusioned with liberalism.

Irving Kristol and Leo Strauss were founders of the movement. The magazines Commentary and Public Interest were their key outlets, as well as op-ed articles for major newspapers and position papers for think tanks. Activists around Democratic senator Henry Jackson became deeply involved as well. Prominent spokesmen include Gertrude Himmelfarb, Bill Kristol, Paul Wolfowitz, Lewis Libby, Norman Podhoretz, Richard Pipes, David Horowitz, Charles Krauthammer, Richard Perle, Robert Kagan, Elliott Abrams and Ben Wattenberg. Meanwhile, Senator Daniel Patrick Moynihan was highly sympathetic but remained a Democrat. Some of Strauss' influential neoconservative disciples included Supreme Court nominee Robert Bork, Paul Wolfowitz (who became Deputy Secretary of Defense), Alan Keyes (who became Assistant Secretary of State), William Bennett (who became Secretary of Education), Weekly Standard editor William Kristol, political philosopher Allan Bloom, writer John Podhoretz, college president John Agresto, political scientist Harry V. Jaffa and novelist Saul Bellow.

Neoconservatives generally support pro-business policies. Some went on to high policy-making or advisory positions in the Reagan, Bush I and Bush II administrations.

=== Conservatism in the South ===
The Southern United States as defined by the United States Census Bureau

Increased conservatism within the Republican Party attracted conservative white Southern Democrats in presidential elections. A few big names switched to the GOP, including South Carolina Senator Strom Thurmond in 1964 and Texas Governor John Connally in 1973. Starting in 1968 in the South, the GOP dominated most presidential elections (1976 was the exception), but not until the 1990s did the GOP become dominant in state and local politics in the region. Through the Southern strategy, Republicans built their strength among Southern Baptists and other religious Fundamentalists, social conservatives, middle-class suburbanites, migrants from the North, and Hispanic people in Florida. Meanwhile, continuing the trend since the New Deal in the 1930s, African American voters in the South showed increasing support for the Democratic Party at both the presidential and local levels. They elected a number of congressmen and mayors. In 1990, there were still many moderate white Democrats holding office in the South, but when they retired they were typically replaced by more conservative Republicans and black people. In the 21st century, political scientists point to the strong base of social conservatism in the South. The evangelical Protestants, comprising the "Religious Right", have since the 1980s strongly influenced the vote in Republican primaries, for "it is primarily in the South where the evangelical core of the GOP is strongest."

=== Think Tanks and Foundations ===
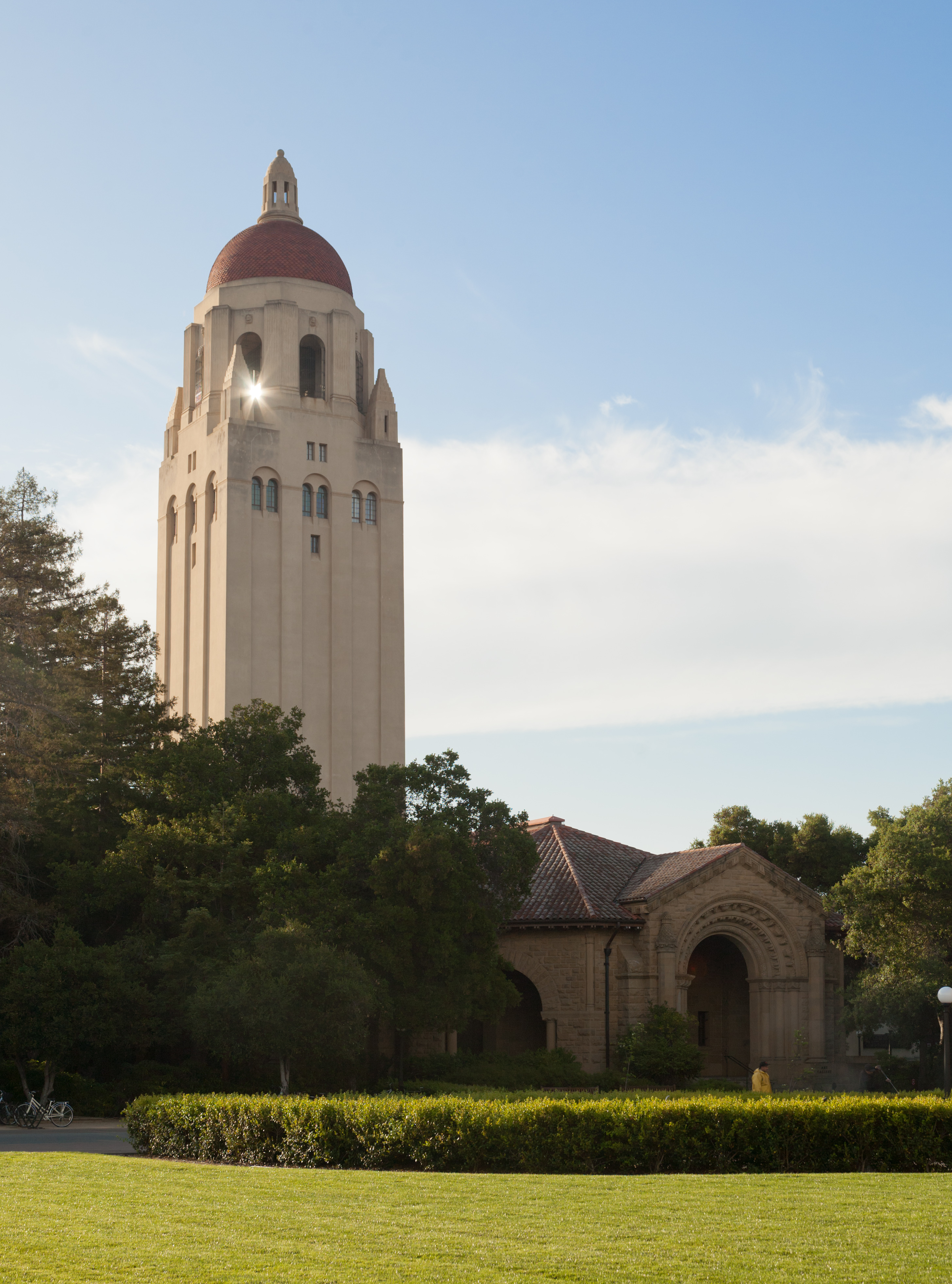
Hoover Tower at the Hoover Institution

In 1971, Lewis F. Powell Jr. urged conservatives to retake command of public discourse through a concerted media outreach campaign. In Powell's view, this would involve monitoring "national television networks…; induc[ing] more 'publishing' by independent scholars who do believe in the [free enterprise] system"; publishing in "magazines and periodicals—ranging from the popular magazines to the more intellectual ones"; issuing "books, paperbacks, and pamphlets"; and dedicating advertising dollars to "a sustained, major effort to inform and enlighten the American people." Conservative think tanks like the American Enterprise Institute and The Heritage Foundation brought in intellectuals for shorter or longer periods, financed research, and disseminated the products through conferences, publications, and systematic media campaigns. They typically focused on projects with immediate policy implications.

Aware that the Brookings Institution had played an influential role for decades in promoting liberal ideas, the Heritage Foundation was designed as a counterpart on the right. Meanwhile, older conservative think tanks such as the American Enterprise Institute grew rapidly as a result of major increases in conservative philanthropy. Both think tanks became more oriented to the news media, more aggressively ideological, and more focused on rapid-response production and shorter publications. At the same time, they generally eschewed long-term research in favor of projects with immediate policy implications and the production of synthetic materials rather than long-term research.

In the following decades, conservative policies once considered outside the political mainstream—such as reducing welfare, privatizing Social Security, deregulating banking, considering preemptive war, were taken seriously and sometimes passed into law due in part to the work of the Hoover Institution, the Heritage Foundation, the Cato Institute, the Hudson Institute, the American Enterprise Institute, and various smaller think tanks.

Complaining that mainstream academia was hostile to conservatives, several foundations became especially active in funding conservative policy research, notably the Adolph Coors Foundation, the Bradley Foundation, the Koch family foundations, the Scaife Foundations, and (until it closed in 2005), the John M. Olin Foundation. Typically, they have emphasized the need for market-based solutions to national problems. The foundations often invested in conservative student publications and organizations, such as the Intercollegiate Studies Institute and legal foundations such as the Federalist Society.

Policy entrepreneurs such as William Baroody, Edwin Feulner and Paul Weyrich started to entrench conservatism in public research institutions. Their aim was to rival the liberal regime for the control of the sources of power. The appearance of think tanks changed the history of conservatism and left an enormous imprint on the Republican right in subsequent years.

=== Richard Nixon, Gerald Ford and Jimmy Carter ===
The Republican administrations of President Richard Nixon (1969–74) and Gerald Ford (1974–77) were characterized by their emphasis on détente and on economic intervention through wage and price controls. Ford angered conservatives by retaining Henry Kissinger as Secretary of State and pushing his policy of détente with the Soviet Union. Conservatives finally found a new champion in Ronald Reagan, whose 8 years as governor of California had just ended in 1976, and supported his campaign for the 1976 Republican Party presidential primaries. Ford narrowly won renomination but lost the White House. Following major gains by Democratic liberals in the 1976 presidential election, Jimmy Carter was elected as president. Carter proved too liberal for his fellow Southern Baptists, ( they voted for him in 1976 but not 1980), too conservative for the mainstream of the Democratic Party, and many considered his foreign policy a failure. Carter realized there was a strong national sense of malaise, as inflation skyrocketed, interest rates soared, the economy stagnated, and prolonged humiliation resulted when Islamic militants in Tehran kept American diplomats hostage for 444 days in 1979–81.

=== 1970s recessions ===
During the recessions of the 1970s, inflation and unemployment rates soared simultaneously and budget deficits began to raise concerns among many Americans. In the early 1970s, America was still a moderately progressive country, as citizens supported social programs and voted down efforts to cut taxes. But by the end of the decade, a full-fledged tax revolt had gotten underway, led by the overwhelming passage of 1978 California Proposition 13, which sharply cut property taxes, and the growing Congressional support for the Kemp-Roth tax bill, which proposed cutting federal income taxes by 30 percent. Supply-side economics developed during the 1970s in response to Keynesian economic policy, and in particular the failure of demand management to stabilize Western economies during the stagflation of the 1970s, in the wake of the oil crisis in 1973. It drew on a range of non-Keynesian economic thought, particularly the Chicago School and the Austrian School.

=== Stopping the Equal Rights Amendment ===
Conservative women were mobilized in the 1970s by Phyllis Schlafly in an effort to stop ratification of the Equal Rights Amendment (ERA) to the U.S. Constitution. The ERA had seemed a noncontroversial effort to provide legal equality when it easily passed Congress in 1972 and quickly was ratified by 28 of the necessary 38 states. Schlafly denounced it as tilting the playing field against the middle-class housewife in a power grab by anti-family feminists on the left. She warned it would mean women would be drafted in the United States Armed Forces on the same basis as men. Through her Eagle Forum she organized state-by-state to block further ratification, and to have states rescind their ratification. The United States Congress extended the time needed, and a movement among feminists tried to boycott tourist cities in states that had not ratified (such as Chicago and New Orleans). It was to no avail. The ERA never became law and Schlafly became a major spokesperson for feminist traditionalism in the conservative movement.

== 1980s: Reagan Era ==
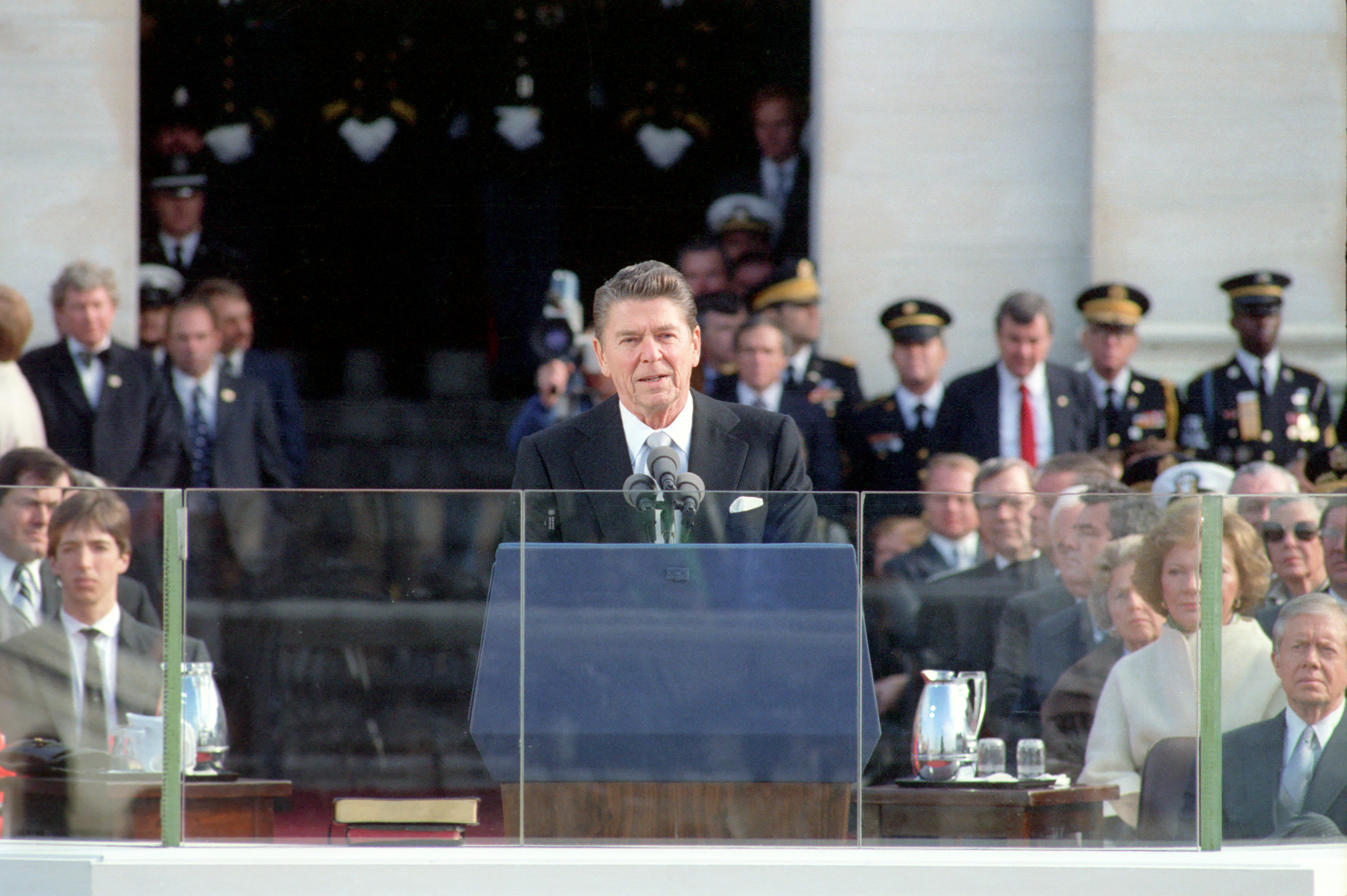

First inaugural address of Ronald Reagan, 1981 (audio only)

With Ronald Reagan's victory in 1980 the modern American conservative movement took power. Republicans took control of the Senate for the first time since 1954, and conservative principles dominated Reagan's economic and foreign policies, with supply-side economics and strict opposition to Soviet Communism defining the Administration's philosophy. Reagan's ideas were largely espoused and supported by the conservative Heritage Foundation, which grew dramatically in its influence during the Reagan years, extended to a second term by the 1984 presidential election, as Reagan and his senior aides looked to Heritage for policy guidance.

An icon of the American conservative movement, Reagan is credited by his supporters with transforming the politics of the United States, galvanizing the success of the Republican Party. He brought together a coalition of economic conservatives, who supported his supply side economics; foreign policy conservatives, who favored his staunch opposition to Communism and the Soviet Union; and social conservatives, who identified with his religious and social ideals. Reagan labeled the Soviet Union the "evil empire." Conservatives also supported the Reagan Doctrine, under which the U.S. provided military and other aid to insurgency movements resisting governments aligned with the Soviet Union. For these and other efforts, Reagan was attacked by liberals at the time as a dangerous warmonger, but conservative historians assert that he decisively won the Cold War.

In defining conservatism, Reagan said: "If you analyze it I believe the very heart and soul of conservatism is libertarianism. I think conservatism is really a misnomer just as liberalism is a misnomer for the liberals—if we were back in the days of the Revolution, so-called conservatives today would be the Liberals and the liberals would be the Tories. The basis of conservatism is a desire for less government interference or less centralized authority or more individual freedom and this is a pretty general description also of what libertarianism is." Reagan's views on government were influenced by Thomas Jefferson, especially his hostility to strong central governments. "We're still Jefferson's children," he declared in 1987. He also stated, "Freedom is not created by Government, nor is it a gift from those in political power. It is, in fact, secured, more than anything else, by limitations placed on those in Government". Likewise he greatly admired and often quoted Abraham Lincoln.

Supply side economics dominated the Reagan Era. During his eight years in office the national debt more than doubled, from $907 billion in 1980 to $2.6 trillion in 1988, and consumer prices rose by more than 50%. But despite cuts in income tax rates, federal income tax revenues grew from $244 billion in 1980 to $467 billion in 1990. The real median family income, which had declined during the previous administration, grew by about ten percent under Reagan. The period from 1981 to 1989 was among the most prosperous in American history, with 17 million new jobs created.

The 1980s also saw the founding of The Washington Times, a newspaper influential in the conservative movement. Reagan was said to have read the paper every morning, and the paper had close ties to multiple Republican administrations. In 1987, after the end of the fairness doctrine, conservative talk radio began to grow in significance, preventing the demise of many AM radio stations.

== Since 1990 ==
In 2012, Time stated there has been an identity crisis in U.S. conservatism growing since the end of the Cold War and the Presidency of Ronald Reagan. Supporters of classical liberalism—distinct from modern liberalism—tend to identify as "conservatives," and in the 21st century, classical liberalism remains a major force within the Republican Party and the larger conservative movement. In the 21st Century, only in the United States is classical liberalism a significant political ideology.

=== 1990s ===
After the end of the Reagan administration significant change occurred within the conservative movement during the George H. W. Bush and Bill Clinton Administrations. In 1992, many conservatives repudiated President George H. W. Bush because he campaigned to the center of the American political spectrum, whereas Bill Clinton campaigned to the right of the center. He was defeated for reelection in 1992 in a three-way race, with populist Ross Perot attracting considerable support on the right. Democrat Bill Clinton was stopped in his plan for government health care. In 1994, the GOP made sweeping gains under the leadership of Newt Gingrich, the first Republican to become Speaker in 40 years. Gingrich overplayed his hand by cutting off funding for the Federal government, allowing Clinton to regain momentum and win reelection in 1996. The "Contract with America" promised numerous reforms, but little was accomplished beyond the ending of major New Deal welfare programs. A national movement to impose term limits failed to reach Congress (because the Supreme Court ruled that a constitutional amendment was needed) but did transform politics in some states, especially California. Some sources have argued that Clinton, while a member of the Democratic Party, governed as a conservative.

Beginning in the early 1990s conservative leaning internet sites began to emerge, such as Drudge Report, Free Republic, and Townhall. These websites were created due to an alleged liberal bias within mainstream media. Since then, conservative leaning internet sites have gained a significant following, and have received more readership than liberal leaning internet sites.

=== George W. Bush ===
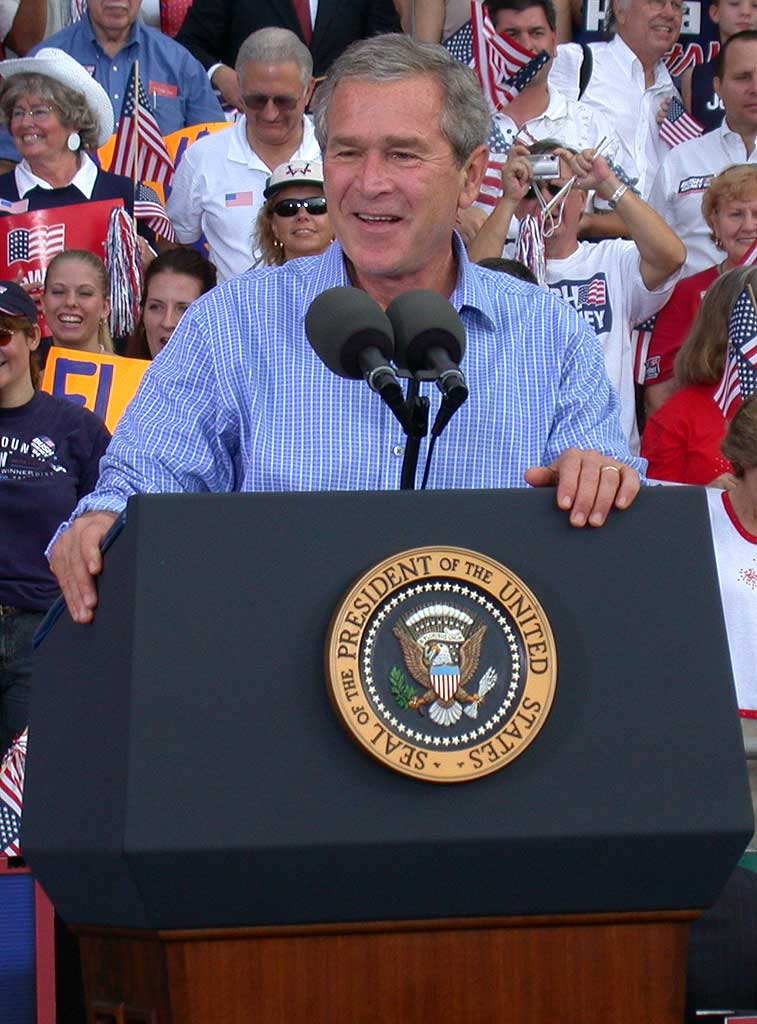
George W. Bush speaks at a campaign rally in 2004.

The election of George W. Bush in 2000 brought a new generation of conservatives to power in Washington. Bush ran under the banner of compassionate conservatism, contrasting himself with other members of the Republican Party. Bush cut taxes in a 10-year plan that was renewed in late 2010, following major debate. Bush forged a bipartisan coalition to pass "No Child Left Behind", which for the first time imposed national standards on public schools. Bush expanded Medicaid, and was criticized by conservatives. The September 2001 terrorist attacks resulted in American commitment to the War against Terror with invasions of Afghanistan in 2001 and Iraq in 2003.

Bush won solid support from Republicans in Congress and from conservative voters in his 2004 reelection campaign. Exit polls in 2004 showed that 34% of the voters identified themselves as "conservatives" and they voted 84% for Bush. By contrast, 21% identified as "liberals," of whom 13% voted for Bush; 45% were "moderates" and they voted 45% for Bush. Almost the same pattern had appeared in the 2000 exit polls. The exit polls show Bush won 57% of the rural vote, 52% of the suburban vote and 45% of the urban vote.

When the financial system verged on total collapse in 2008, Bush pushed through large scale rescue packages for banks and auto companies that even some conservatives in Congress did not support. Some noted conservatives, including Richard A. Viguerie and William F. Buckley, Jr., have said that Bush was not a "true" conservative.

=== 2008–present ===
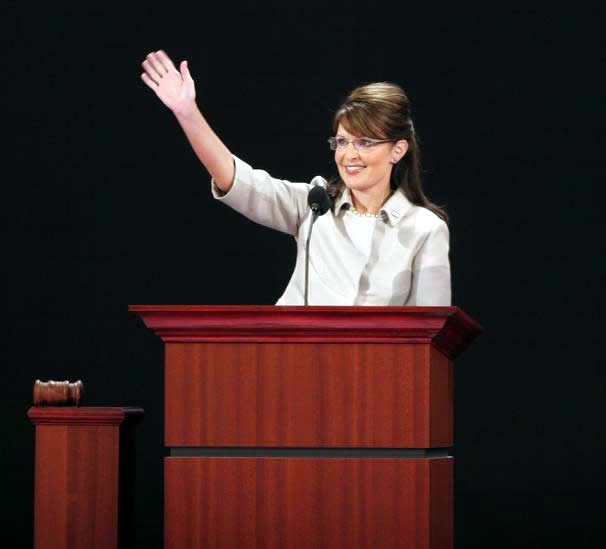
Sarah Palin addresses the 2008 Republican National Convention in Saint Paul, Minnesota.

The Republican contest for the nomination in 2008 was a free-for-all, with Senator John McCain the winner, facing Barack Obama. McCain chose Alaska Governor Sarah Palin as his running mate, and while she was greeted by the GOP establishment with initial skepticism, she electrified many conservatives and became a major political force on the right. In 2008, a period that began in 1980, termed the "conservative era" ended.

After the election of Obama for president, Republicans in Congress were unified in almost total opposition to the programs and policies of Obama and the Democratic majority. They unsuccessfully attempted to stop an $814 billion stimulus spending program, new regulations on investment firms, and a program to require health insurance for all Americans. They did keep emissions trading from coming to a vote, and vowed to continue to work to convince Americans that burning fossil fuel does not cause global warming. The slow growth of the economy in the first two years of the Obama administration led Republicans to call for a return to tax cuts and deregulation of businesses, which they perceived as the best way to solve the 2008 financial crisis. Obama's approval rating steadily declined in his first year in office before leveling off at about 50-50. This decline in popularity led to a GOP landslide in the mid-term elections of 2010.

On foreign policy, some conservatives, especially neoconservatives and those in the National Review circle, supported Obama's policy of a surge fighting in Afghanistan, air raids to support the insurgents in Libya, and the war on terror, especially after he ordered the killing of Osama bin Laden in Abbottabad, Pakistan in May 2011. At issue in 2012 was the efficacy of diplomacy and sanctions to stop Iran from building nuclear weapons.

In the 2016 Republican Party presidential primary, Donald Trump won. Multiple commentators argued that Trump was not a conservative, but a populist. In February 2017, Politico wrote that the election of Trump and his presidency has split conservatives in the United States. During his presidency, Donald Trump took stances against free trade, which had been a Republican ideology since Ronald Reagan. He enacted protectionist policies aimed at keeping jobs in America, rather than them outsourcing to other countries. In order to do so, he enacted stiff tariffs against numerous counties, in particular China.

During the COVID-19 pandemic, Republicans have continued to support limited government regulations in response to government initiated restrictions due to the virus. Some conservatives have warmed to the idea of using government power to stop business-initiated restrictions, such as vaccine passports. In April 2021, Governor Ron DeSantis of Florida banned businesses from requiring employees and patrons to present proof of vaccination, and in November, limited their ability to implement vaccine mandates for workers, requiring establishments to allow various exemptions. These actions were widely seen as contrary to the conservative principals of the past, with those in favor arguing that the actions were necessary to protect people from being forced to get a vaccine.

==== Tea Party ====
Tea Party protesters walk towards the United States Capitol during the Taxpayer March on Washington on September 12, 2009.

A relatively new element of conservatism is the Tea Party movement, a libertarian grassroots movement comprising over 600 local units who communally express dissatisfaction with the government and both major parties. Many units have promoted activism and protests. The stated purpose of the movement is to stop what it views as wasteful government spending, excessive taxation, and strangulation of the economy through regulatory bureaucracies. The Tea Party attracted national attention when it propelled Republican Scott Brown to a victory in the Senate election for the Massachusetts seat held by the Kennedy brothers for nearly 60 years. In 2010, Tea Party candidates upset establishment Republicans in several primaries, such as Alaska, Colorado, Delaware, Florida, Nevada, New York, South Carolina, and Utah, giving a new momentum to the conservative cause in the 2010 elections, and boosting Sarah Palin's visibility. Rasmussen and Schoen (2010) conclude that "She is the symbolic leader of the movement, and more than anyone else has helped to shape it." In the fall 2010 elections, the New York Times identified 129 House candidates with significant Tea Party support, as well as 9 running for the Senate; all are Republicans, as the Tea Party has not been active among Democrats.

The Tea Party is a conglomerate of conservatives with diverse viewpoints including libertarians and social conservatives. Most Tea Party supporters self-identify as "angry at the government". One survey found that Tea Party supporters in particular distinguish themselves from general Republican attitudes on social issues such as same-sex marriage, abortion and illegal immigration, as well as global warming. However, discussion of abortion and gay rights has also been downplayed by Tea Party leadership. In the lead-up to the 2010 election, most Tea Party candidates have focused on federal spending and deficits, with little focus on foreign policy.

Noting the lack of central organization or an explicit spokesmen, Matthew Continetti of The Weekly Standard has said: "There is no single Tea Party. The name is an umbrella that encompasses many different groups. Under this umbrella, you'll find everyone from the woolly fringe to Ron Paul supporters, from Americans for Prosperity to religious conservatives, independents, and citizens who never have been active in politics before. The umbrella is gigantic."

Gallup Poll editors noted in 2010 that "in addition to conservatives being more enthusiastic than liberals about voting in this year's election, their relative advantage on enthusiasm is much greater than we've seen in the recent past."

== See also ==
- Timeline of modern American conservatism

== Primary sources ==
- Buckley, William F., Jr., ed. Did You Ever See a Dream Walking? American Conservative Thought in the 20th Century Bobbs-Merrill (1970).
- Gregory L. Schneider, ed. Conservatism in America Since 1930: A Reader (2003).
- Wolfe, Gregory. Right Minds: A Sourcebook of American Conservative Thought. Regnery (1987).
