= Traditionalist conservatism in the United States =

Historical form of conservatism in the United States

Traditionalist conservatism in the United States is a political and social philosophy and variant of conservatism. It has been influenced by thinkers such as John Adams and Russell Kirk.

== Definitions ==
The 2010 book The Dilemmas of American Conservatism, edited by Kenneth L. Deutsch and Ethan Fishman, has one paragraph about traditional conservatism. It says it is a variation of conservatism that is negative to American individualism, American inability to recognize the importance of social bonds and strong anti-authoritarian tradition of the United States. According to Deutsch and Fishman, traditional conservatives derive their views from Aristotle and Edmund Burke. They place emphasis on the rule of law as a means for liberty, leading by example in the fostering of reason and the existence of a transcendent morality. These views are only shared by a small minority of the American conservative movement and are exemplified by Russell Kirk, John H. Hallowell and Richard M. Weaver.

== History ==
=== 18th century ===
In terms of "classical conservatism", the Federalists had no connection with European-style aristocracy, monarchy or established religion. Historian John P. Diggins has said:

Thanks to the framers, American conservatism began on a genuinely lofty plane. James Madison, Alexander Hamilton, John Marshall, John Jay, James Wilson, and, above all, John Adams aspired to create a republic in which the values so precious to conservatives might flourish: harmony, stability, virtue, reverence, veneration, loyalty, self-discipline, and moderation. This was classical conservatism in its most authentic expression.

Something akin to Burkean traditionalism was transported to the American colonies through the policies and principles of the Federalist Party and its leadership as embodied by John Adams and Alexander Hamilton. Federalists strongly opposed the excesses and instability of the French Revolution, defended traditional Christian morality and supported a new "natural aristocracy" based on "property, education, family status, and sense of ethical responsibility".

John Adams was one of the earliest defenders of a traditional social order in Revolutionary America. In his Defence of the Constitution (1787), Adams attacked the ideas of radicals like Thomas Paine, who advocated for a unicameral legislature (Adams deemed it too democratic). His translation of Discourses on Davila (1790), which also contained his own commentary, was an examination of "human motivation in politics". Adams believed that human motivation inevitably led to dangerous impulses where the government would need to sometimes intervene.

The leader of the Federalist Party was Alexander Hamilton, Secretary of the Treasury and co-author of The Federalist Papers (1787–1788) which was then and to this day remains a major interpretation of the new 1789 Constitution. Hamilton was critical of both Jeffersonian classical liberalism and the radical ideas coming out of the French Revolution. He rejected laissez-faire economics and favored a strong central government.

=== 19th century ===
In the era after the Revolutionary Generation, the Whig Party had an approach that resembled Burkean conservatism, although Whigs rarely cited Burke. Whig statesmen led the charge for tradition and custom against the prevailing democratic ethos of the Jacksonian Era. Standing for hierarchy and organic society, in many ways their concepts of the Union paralleled Benjamin Disraeli's "One Nation Conservatism".

Along with Henry Clay, the most noteworthy Whig statesman was Boston's Daniel Webster. A firm Unionist, his most famous speech was his "Second Reply to Hayne" (1829) where he criticized the argument from Southerners such as John C. Calhoun that the states had a right to nullify federal laws they deemed unconstitutional. Webster rarely mentioned Burke but he occasionally followed similar lines of thought.

Webster's intellectual and political heir was Rufus Choate, who admired Burke. Choate was a part of the emerging legal culture in New England, centered on the newly formed Harvard Law School. He believed that lawyers were preservers and conservers of the Constitution and that it was the duty of the educated to govern political institutions. Choate's most famous address was "The Position and Functions of the American Bar, as an Element of Conservatism in the State" (1845).

Two figures in the Northern antebellum period were what Emory University professor Patrick Allitt referred to as the "Guardians of Civilization": George Ticknor and Edward Everett.

George Ticknor, a Dartmouth-educated academic at Harvard, was the chief purveyor of humane learning in the Boston area. A founder of the Boston Public Library and the scion of an old Federalist family, Ticknor educated his students in Romance languages and the works of Dante and Cervantes at home while promoting America abroad to his many international friends, including Lord Byron and Talleyrand.

Like Ticknor, Edward Everett was educated at the same German university (Goettigen) and advocated for the U.S. to follow same virtues as the ancient Greeks and eventually went into politics as a Whig. A firm Unionist (like his friend Daniel Webster), Everett deplored the Jacksonian Democracy that swept the nation. A famed orator in his own right, he supported Lincoln against Southern secession.

American Catholic journalist and political theorist (and former political and religious radical) Orestes Brownson is best known for writing The American Republic, an 1865 treatise examining how America fulfills Catholic tradition and Western Civilization. Brownson was critical of both the Northern abolitionists and the Southern secessionists and was himself a solid Unionist.

=== 20th century ===
In the 20th century, traditionalist conservatism on both sides of the Atlantic centered on two publications: The Bookman and its successor, The American Review. Owned and edited by the eccentric Seward Collins, these journals published the writings of the British Distributists, the New Humanists, the Southern Agrarians, T. S. Eliot, Christopher Dawson, et al. Eventually, Collins drifted towards support of fascism and as a result lost the support of many of his traditionalist backers. Despite the decline of the journal due to Collins' increasingly radical political views, The American Review left a profound mark on the history of traditionalist conservatism.

Another intellectual branch of early-20th-century traditionalist conservatism was known as the New Humanism. Led by Harvard University professor Irving Babbitt and Princeton University professor Paul Elmer More, the New Humanism was a literary and social criticism movement that opposed both romanticism and naturalism. Beginning in the late 19th century, the New Humanism defended artistic standards and "first principles" (Babbitt's phrase). Reaching an apogee in 1930, Babbitt and More published a variety of books including Babbitt's Literature and the American College (1908), Rousseau and Romanticism (1919) and Democracy and Leadership (1924) and More's Shelburne Essays (1904–1921).

One other group of traditionalist conservatives were the Southern Agrarians. Originally a group of Vanderbilt University poets and writers known as "the Fugitives", they included John Crowe Ransom, Allen Tate, Donald Davidson and Robert Penn Warren. Adhering to strict literary standards (Warren and traditionalist scholar Cleanth Brooks later formulated a form of literary criticism known as the New Criticism), in 1930 some of the Fugitives joined other traditionalist Southern writers to publish I'll Take My Stand, which applied standards sympathetic to local particularism and the agrarian way of life to politics and economics. Condemning northern industrialism and commercialism, the "twelve southerners" who contributed to the book echoed earlier arguments made by the distributists. A few years after the publication of I'll Take My Stand, some of the Southern Agrarians were joined by Hilaire Belloc and Herbert Agar in the publication of a new collection of essays entitled Who Owns America: A New Declaration of Independence.

==== New conservatives ====
After World War II, the first stirrings of a "traditionalist movement" took place and among those who launched this movement (and in effect the larger Conservative Movement in America) was University of Chicago professor Richard M. Weaver. Weaver's Ideas Have Consequences (1948) chronicled the steady erosion of Western cultural values since the Middle Ages. In 1949, another professor, Peter Viereck echoed the writings of Weaver with his Conservatism Revisited, which examined the conservative thought of Prince Klemens Metternich.

After Weaver and Viereck a flowering of conservative scholarship occurred starting with the publication of 1953's The New Science of Politics by Eric Voegelin, 1953's The Quest for Community by Robert A. Nisbet and 1955's Conservatism in America by Clinton Rossiter. However, the book that defined the traditionalist school was 1953's The Conservative Mind, written by Russell Kirk, which gave a detailed analysis of the intellectual pedigree of Anglo-American traditionalist conservatism.

When these thinkers appeared on the academic scene they became known for rebuking the progressive worldview inherent in an America comfortable with New Deal economics, a burgeoning military–industrial complex and a consumerist and commercialized citizenry. These conservative scholars and writers garnered the attention of the popular press of the time and before long they were collectively referred to as "the New Conservatives". Among this group were not only Weaver, Viereck, Voegelin, Nisbet, Rossiter and Kirk, but other lesser known thinkers such as John Blum, Daniel Boorstin, McGeorge Bundy, Thomas Cook, Raymond English, John Hallowell, Anthony Harrigan, August Heckscher, Milton Hindus, Klemens von Klemperer, Erik von Kuehnelt-Leddihn, Richard Leopold, S. A. Lukacs, Malcolm Moos, Eliseo Vivas, Geoffrey Wagner, Chad Walsh and Francis Wilson, as well as Arthur Bestor, Mel Bradford, C. P. Ives, Stanley Jaki, John Lukacs, Forrest McDonald, Thomas Molnar, Gerhard Neimeyer, James V. Schall, S.J., Peter J. Stanlis, Stephen J. Tonsor and Frederick Wilhelmsen.

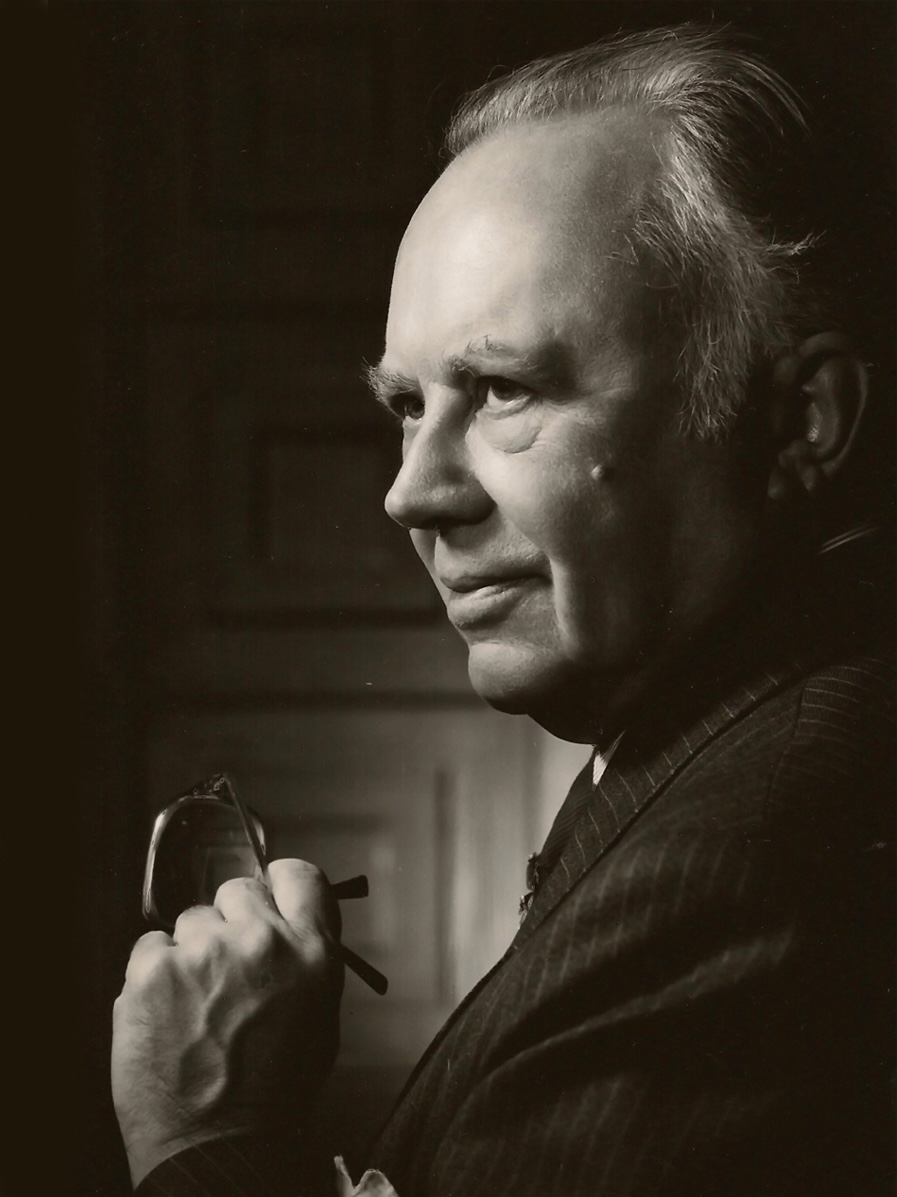
Russell Kirk

The acknowledged leader of the New Conservatives was independent scholar, writer, critic and man of letters Russell Kirk. Kirk was a key figure of the conservative movement: he was a friend to William F. Buckley, Jr., a columnist for National Review, an editor and a syndicated columnist, as well as a historian and horror fiction writer. His most famous work was 1953's The Conservative Mind: From Burke to Santayana, later republished as The Conservative Mind: From Burke to Eliot. Kirk's writings and legacy are interwoven with the history of traditionalist conservatism. He was influential at The Heritage Foundation, the Intercollegiate Studies Institute, and other conservative think tanks, especially the Russell Kirk Center for Cultural Renewal.

The Conservative Mind was written by Kirk as a doctoral dissertation while he was a student at the St. Andrews University in Scotland. Previously the author of a biography of American conservative John Randolph of Roanoke, Kirk's The Conservative Mind had laid out six "canons of conservative thought" in the book, including:

1. Belief that a divine intent rules society as well as conscience... Political problems, at bottom, are religious and moral problems.
2. Affection for the proliferating variety and mystery of traditional life, as distinguished from the narrowing uniformity and egalitarian and utilitarian aims of most radical systems.
3. Conviction that civilized society requires orders and classes...
4. Persuasion that property and freedom are inseparably connected, and that economic leveling is not economic progress...
5. Faith in prescription and distrust of "sophisters and calculators." Man must put a control upon his will and his appetite.... Tradition and sound prejudice provide checks upon man's anarchic impulse.
6. Recognition that change and reform are not identical...

The political scientist M. Morton Auerbach criticized the notion of the New Conservatives as conservatives in his 1959 book The Conservative Illusion. Auerbach argued that the views and intellectual history of the movement were disconnected from conservatism, and instead can be traced to Plato, Augustine of Hippo and Edmund Burke.

==== Goldwater movement and its aftermath ====
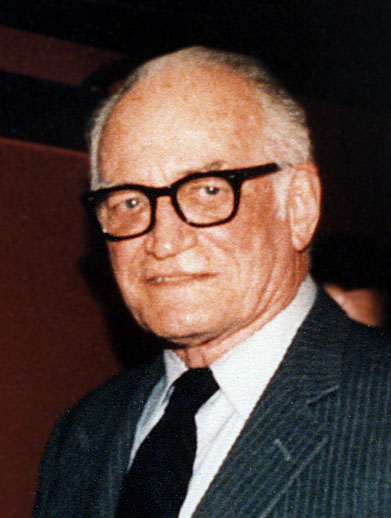
Former Senator Barry Goldwater

U.S. Senator Barry Goldwater gained national attention by way of The Conscience of a Conservative, a book ghostwritten for him by L. Brent Bozell Jr. (William F. Buckley, Jr.'s Catholic traditionalist brother-in-law). The book advocated a conservative vision in keeping with Buckley's National Review and propelled Goldwater to challenge Vice President Richard Nixon, without success, for the 1960 Republican presidential nomination.

In 1964, Goldwater returned to challenge the Eastern Establishment, which since the 1930s had controlled the Republican Party. In a brutal campaign where he was maligned by liberal Republican primary rivals (Rockefeller, Romney, Scranton, etc.), the press, the Democrats and President Lyndon B. Johnson, Goldwater again found allies among conservatives, including the traditionalists. Russell Kirk championed Goldwater's cause as the maturation of the New Right in American politics. Kirk advocated for Goldwater in his syndicated columns and campaigned for him in the primaries. Goldwater's subsequent defeat would result in the New Right regrouping and finding a new figurehead in the late 1970s: Ronald Reagan.

Fundamental differences developed between libertarians and traditional conservatives. Libertarians wanted the free market to be unregulated as possible while traditional conservatives believed that big business, if unconstrained, could impoverish national life and threaten freedom. Libertarians also believed that a strong state would threaten freedom while traditional conservatives regarded a strong state, one which is properly constructed to ensure that not too much power accumulated in any one branch, was necessary to ensure freedom.

== Leading 20th and 21st century traditionalist figures ==
Traditionalist conservatism has been considered by some to have been overshadowed by the economic conservatives by the early 21st century.

Former Tennessee Republican Senator Fred Thompson, former Michigan Republican Senator Spencer Abraham and former Illinois Democratic Senator Paul Simon have all been influenced by traditionalist conservative Russell Kirk. Thompson gave an interview about Kirk's influence on the Russell Kirk Center's blog. Among the U.S. Congressmen influenced by Kirk are former Illinois Republican Congressman Henry Hyde and Michigan Republican Congressmen Thaddeus McCotter and Dave Camp, the latter two of whom visited the Russell Kirk Center in 2009. In 2010, then-Congressman Mike Pence acknowledged Kirk as a major influence. Former Michigan Republican Governor John Engler is a close personal friend of the Kirk family and also serves as a trustee of the Wilbur Foundation, which funds programs at the Russell Kirk Center for Cultural Renewal in Mecosta, Michigan. Engler gave a speech at The Heritage Foundation on Kirk which is available from the Russell Kirk Center's blog.

=== Other influences ===
Traditionalist conservative influences on those who emerged in the 1940s and 1950s as "the New Conservatives" included Bernard Iddings Bell, Gordon Keith Chalmers, Grenville Clark, Peter Drucker, Will Herberg, and Ross J. S. Hoffman.

== Organizations ==
- Intercollegiate Studies Institute
- Philadelphia Society
- Howard Center for Family, Religion and Society
- National Humanities Institute
- Russell Kirk Center for Cultural Renewal

== Journals, periodicals and reviews ==
- Modern Age: A Quarterly Review
- Touchstone Magazine
- The University Bookman
- The Political Science Reviewer
- The Chesterton Review
- Image: A Journal of the Arts and Religion

== See also ==
- Conservatism in the United States
- Traditionalist conservatism
- Traditional Values Coalition

== Bibliography ==
- Aberbach, Joel D.; Peele, Gillian (2011). "Conservative Tensions and the Republican Future". Crisis of Conservatism?: The Republican Party, the Conservative Movement, and American Politics After Bush. Oxford University Press. ISBN 978-0-199-83136-4.
- Bogus, Carl T. (2011). Buckley: William F. Buckley Jr. and the Rise of American Conservatism. Bloomsbury Publishing. ISBN 978-1-596-91580-0.
- Deutsch, Kenneth L.; Fishman, Ethan (2010). The Dilemmas of American Conservatism. University Press of Kentucky. ISBN 978-0-813-13962-3.
