= New humanism =

New humanism may refer to

- New humanism philosophy by Indian philosopher M. N. Roy.
- German new humanism, or new humanism (Neuhumanismus)
- New humanism (literature)
- Neohumanism, a holistic philosophical theory given by Prabhat Ranjan Sarkar.

== See also ==
- New Humanism (Humanist Movement)
- New Humanist, magazine
