= The Conservative Illusion =

1959 book by M. Morton Auerbach

- Author: M. Morton Auerbach
- Language: English
- Subject: Conservatism in the United States
- Publisher: Columbia University Press
- Publication date: 1959
- Publication place: United States
- Pages: 359

The Conservative Illusion is a 1959 book by the American political scientist M. Morton Auerbach. It is a critical review of what has been labeled "conservatism" in the United States, which Auerbach traces not to conservative thinkers, but to Plato, Augustine of Hippo and Edmund Burke. The book was written in response to America's post-war "New Conservatives" such as Russell Kirk, Reinhold Niebuhr, Peter Viereck and Will Herberg.
