= The Conservative Mind =

1953 book by Russell Kirk

- Author: Russell Kirk
- Language: English
- Genre: Political philosophy · Intellectual history
- Publisher: Henry Regnery Company
- Publication date: 1953
- Publication place: United States
- Pages: 448

The Conservative Mind is a book by American conservative philosopher Russell Kirk. It was first published in 1953 as Kirk's doctoral dissertation and has since gone into seven editions, the later ones with the subtitle From Burke to Eliot. It traces the development of conservative thought in the Anglo-American tradition, giving special importance to the ideas of Edmund Burke.

The work is a classic in the intellectual tradition of conservatism. It influenced the postwar conservative movement in the United States and revived 20th century Burkean thought. It has been translated to a number of languages such as Bulgarian, Czech, German, Italian, Polish, Spanish, and Portuguese.

== Content ==
In The Conservative Mind, Kirk developed six canons of conservatism:

1. A belief in a transcendent order, which Kirk described variously as based in tradition, divine revelation, or natural law;
2. An affection for the "variety and mystery" of human existence;
3. A conviction that society requires orders and classes that emphasize natural distinctions;
4. A belief that property and freedom are closely linked;
5. A faith in custom, convention, and prescription, and
6. A recognition that innovation must be tied to existing traditions and customs, which entails a respect for the political value of prudence.

In addition to bringing attention to Anglo-American conservative principles, Kirk described his perception of liberal ideals in the first chapter: the perfectibility of man, hostility towards tradition, rapid change in economic and political systems, and the secularization of government. Kirk also argued that the American Revolution was "a conservative reaction, in the English political tradition, against royal innovation."

The work also draws attention to:

- Conservative statesmen such as George Washington, John Adams, Alexander Hamilton, Fisher Ames, George Canning, John C. Calhoun, John Randolph of Roanoke, Edmund Burke, Joseph de Maistre, Benjamin Disraeli, and Arthur Balfour;
- The conservative implications of writings by well-known authors such as Samuel Taylor Coleridge, Sir Walter Scott, Alexis de Tocqueville, James Fenimore Cooper, Nathaniel Hawthorne, James Russell Lowell, George Gissing, George Santayana, Robert Frost, and T. S. Eliot;
- British and American authors such as Fisher Ames, John Randolph of Roanoke, Orestes Brownson, John Henry Newman, Walter Bagehot, Henry James Sumner Maine, William Edward Hartpole Lecky, Edwin Lawrence Godkin, William Hurrell Mallock, Leslie Stephen, Albert Venn Dicey, Robert Nisbet, Paul Elmer More, and Irving Babbitt.

The Conservative Mind hardly mentions economics at all. Kirk grounded his Burkean conservatism in tradition, political philosophy, belles lettres, and religious faith, rather than free market economic reasoning.

== Reception ==
Many commentators have praised The Conservative Mind. Whittaker Chambers called it the most important book of the 20th century. James J. Kilpatrick called it the best and clearest exposition of the conservative philosophy. David Frum described it as follows:

A profound critique of contemporary mass society, and a vivid and poetic image – not a program, an image – of how that society might better itself. […] in important respects, the twentieth century's own version of [Edmund Burke's] Reflections on the Revolution in France. […] Kirk was an artist, a visionary, almost a prophet.

By tracing an intellectual heritage from Edmund Burke to the Old Right in the early 1950s, The Conservative Mind challenged the notion among intellectuals that no coherent conservative tradition existed in the United States.

Biographer Bradley J. Birzer argues that for all his importance in inspiring the modern conservative movement, not many of his followers agreed with his unusual approach to the history of conservatism. As summarized by reviewer Drew Maciag:

Kirk's understanding of conservatism was so unique, idiosyncratic, transcendental, elitist, and in certain respects premodern and European, that it bore little resemblance to political conservatism in the United States. Conservative Mind successfully launched an intellectual challenge to postwar liberalism, but the variety of conservatism Kirk preferred found few takers, even within the American Right.

== See also ==
- Edmund Burke
- Traditionalist conservatism
