= Frederick John Teggart =

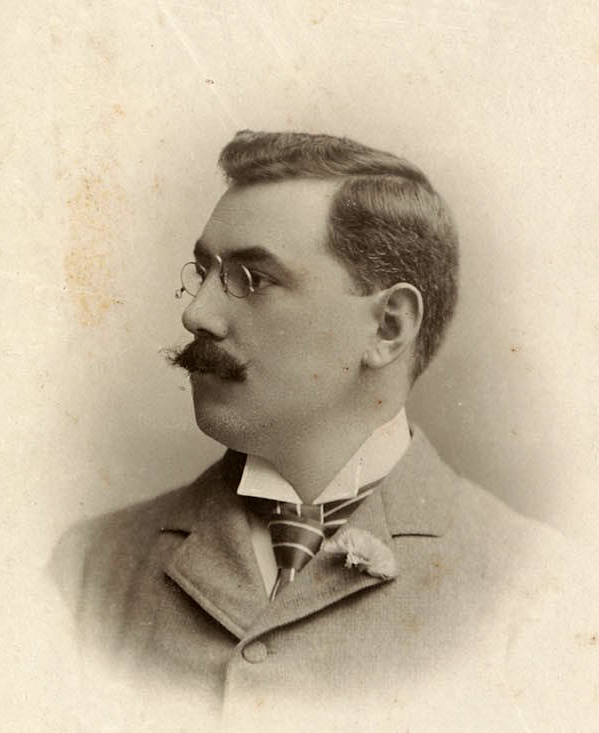
- Born: May 9, 1870; Belfast, Great Britain
- Died: October 12, 1946 (aged 76); Berkeley, California, U.S.
- Education: Methodist College Belfast; Trinity College Dublin; Stanford University
- Scientific career
- Fields: History
- Workplaces: University of California

Frederick John Teggart (1870–1946) was an Irish-American historian and social scientist, known for work on the history of civilizations.

== Life ==
He was born in Belfast on 9 May 1870, and was educated at Methodist College Belfast and Trinity College, Dublin. He emigrated to the United States and graduated B.A. at Stanford University in 1894. He then worked as a librarian, first at Stanford and then at the Mechanics-Mercantile Library in San Francisco.

He had positions at the University of California, becoming Associate Professor there in 1911; in 1919 a new department was set up for him, at Berkeley, the Department of Social Institutions. A full professor in 1925, he retired in 1940, although he remained actively engaged in research until shortly before his death. He supervised Robert Nisbet's doctorate studies.

== Influence on Toynbee ==
When Arnold J. Toynbee was still forming his concept for A Study of History he read some of Teggart's works. "You are quite right about my debt to Professor Teggart," he wrote U.C. sociology professor Margaret T. Hodgen. "I read [. . .] his books at a time when, though I knew what I wanted to do, I still could not find the right starting point. Dr. Teggart's work, more than anyone else's, opened the door for me."

== Works ==
- Prolegomena to history: the relation of history to literature, philosophy, and science (Berkeley: University of California Press, 1916)
- The Processes of History (New Haven: Yale University Press, 1918)
- Theory of History (New Haven: Yale University Press, 1925)
- Rome and China: a study of correlations in historical events (1939)
