= Democracy and Leadership =

1924 book by Irving Babbitt

- 1979 publication (Liberty Fund Inc.)
- Author: Irving Babbitt
- Original title: Democracy and Leadership
- Language: English
- Subject: Political Science
- Genre: politics
- Published: 1924 by Boston and New York Houghton Mifflin Company. The Riverside Press. Cambridge, Massachusetts
- Publication place: United States
- Media type: print
- Pages: 392
- ISBN: 0913966541

Democracy and Leadership is a book by Irving Babbitt, first published by Houghton Mifflin in 1924. A new edition was published by Liberty Fund Inc. in 1979, with an introduction by Russell Kirk.

== Synopsis ==
Babbitt criticizes what he calls the naturalistic movement in modern Western society. He distinguishes two aspects of this movement, letting Francis Bacon exemplify its mechanistic and utilitarian side and Jean-Jacques Rousseau its sentimental side. Both ignore the need to order human life with reference to a transcendent ethical principle. The utilitarian and sentimental dispositions are frequently joined in a single individual. According to Babbitt, no amount of sentimental “love” or sociopolitical activism can substitute for a lack of real moral character. The book rejects historical deterministic philosophies from Saint Augustine to Bossuet. It details political philosophy from Aristotle onwards, explaining how governmental philosophies have tried and failed over time. In the book, Babbitt provides a convincing critique of "unchecked majoritarianism," while dealing with the issue of how to find leaders who have high standards.

== Recognition ==
- "...one of the few truly important works of political thought." —Russell Kirk
- "Today, the wisdom of Babbitt's view is apparent." —Joe Lee Davis

== Background ==
Babbitt considered moral character so important that it could not be superseded by socio-political activism or sentimentality. In some cases, he believed social reform could be helpful, but never as a replacement for individual conscience. He explains: "With the present trend toward 'social justice,' the time is rapidly approaching when everybody will be minding everybody else’s business. For the conscience that is felt as a still, small voice and that is the basis of real justice, we have substituted a social conscience that operates rather through a megaphone. The busybody, for the first time perhaps in the history of the world, has been taken at his own estimate of himself."
