= Paul Elmer More =

American journalist, critic, essayist and Christian apologist

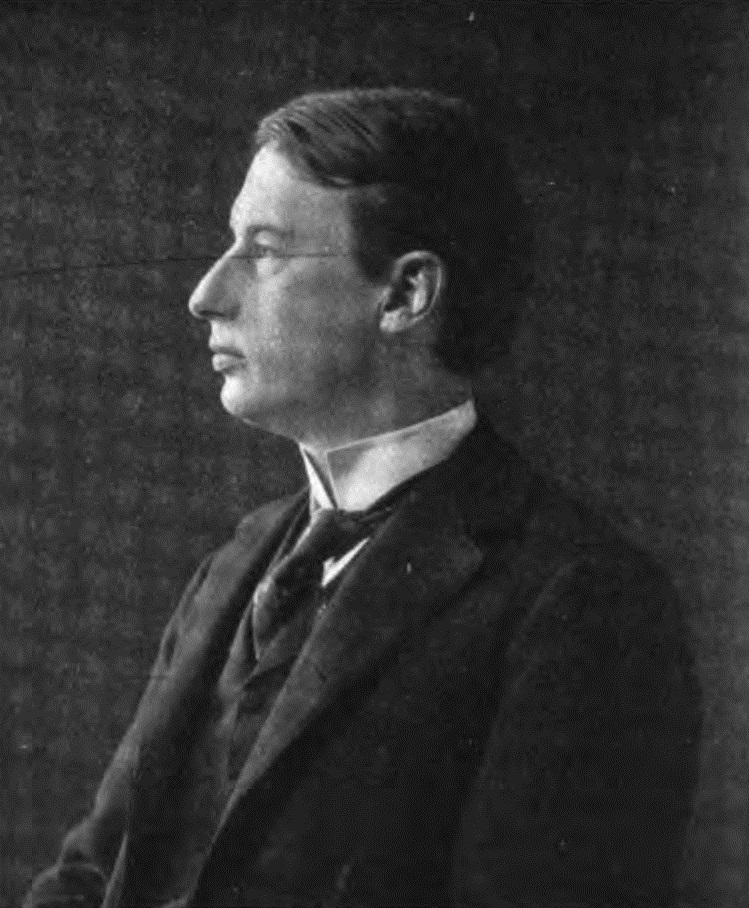
- Born: 12 December 1864; St. Louis, Missouri, U.S.
- Died: 9 March 1937 (aged 72); Princeton, New Jersey, U.S.
- Other name: "Dicast"
- Occupations: Journalist, essayist
- Writing career
- Genres: Christian apologetics, Poetry

Paul Elmer More (December 12, 1864 – March 9, 1937) was an American journalist, critic, essayist and Christian apologist.

== Biography ==
Paul Elmer More, the son of Enoch Anson and Katherine Hay Elmer, was born in St. Louis, Missouri. He was educated at Washington University in St. Louis and Harvard University. More taught Sanskrit at Harvard (1894-1895) and Bryn Mawr (1895-1897).

After his short career as an academic, he worked as a literary editor on The Independent, the New York Evening Post and The Nation. He started on his Shelburne Essays in 1904; they were to run to 11 published volumes, drawing on his periodical writing, and were followed later by the New Shelburne Essays, in three volumes from 1928.

In his literary criticism, More generally upheld the classical English authors who display, as he put it, a "deep-rooted sense of moral responsibility"—Shakespeare, Johnson, Trollope, Newman—while also accepting those lusty writers of France and America who cannot help but be a little too honest. As Francis X. Duggan notes, "the immorality More most objects to, the most serious offence an artist can commit, is not the obvious one of obscenity or suggestiveness, but a falsification of human nature, the denial of moral responsibility".

He wrote several books after his retirement from journalism, including Platonism (1917); The Religion of Plato (1921); Hellenistic Philosophies (1923); and his last published work, the autobiographical Pages from an Oxford Diary (1937). His Greek Tradition, 5 vols. (1917–27), is generally thought to be his best work.

During the last 15 years of his life, More wrote several books of Christian apologetics, including The Christ of the New Testament (1924), Christ the Word (1927), and The Catholic Faith (1931). As Byron C. Lambert notes, "More's final mission was profoundly religious and what he wanted to leave to the world".

Nevertheless, although Russell Kirk judged him "the twentieth century's greatest apologist", More is little read by Christians today. In Lambert's view, the reason is that More's "Christianity was altogether too idiosyncratic for most Christians. ... [T]oo exotic to be intelligible and too conditional to be authoritative", he lacked the power of "unabashedly orthodox" writers like C. S. Lewis or G. K. Chesterton "to bring Catholic, Protestant, Orthodox, and even fringe believers together in a way that is the surprise of divided Christendom".

That said, the man of whom Russell Kirk wrote, "as a critic of ideas, perhaps there has not been his peer in England or America since Coleridge," has much to offer the discriminating Christian reader. Kirk cites, for instance, More's insight into the "enormous error" of secular humanists. When the religious impulse is replaced by "mere 'brotherhood of man,' fratricide is not far distant." More wrote that the one effective way of "bringing into play some measure of true justice as distinct from the ruthless law of competition...is through the restoration in the individual human soul of a sense of responsibility extending beyond the grave." The alternative is a society "surrendered to the theory of ceaseless flux, with no principle of judgement except the shifting pleasure of the individual."

More saw the loss of Christian culture as entailing intellectual as well as moral collapse. He once remarked to Alfred Noyes that "the ability to think clearly and deeply has been vanishing from all sections of the modern world except those that have some grasp of the philosophy of religion, as it has been developed through two thousand years in the central tradition of Christendom".

More collaborated with Irving Babbitt from before 1900 in the project later labelled New Humanism.

More lived in Princeton, New Jersey. He died on March 9, 1937, at the age of 72.

== See also ==
- American philosophy
- List of American philosophers

== Works ==
- Helena, and Occasional Poems (1890).
- The Great Refusal, Being Letters of a Dreamer in Gotham (1894).
- A Century of Indian Epigrams: Chiefly from the Sanskrit of Bhartrihari (1898).
- The Prometheus Bound of Aeschylus (1899).
- Benjamin Franklin (1900).
- The Jessica Letters: An Editor's Romance (1904).
- Shelburne Essays; First Series (1904).
- Shelburne Essays; Second Series (1906).
- Shelburne Essays; Third Series (1906).
- Shelburne Essays; Fourth Series (1906).
- Shelburne Essays; Fifth Series (1908).
- Studies of Religious Dualism: Shelburne Essays; Sixth Series (1909).
- Shelburne Essays; Seventh Series (1910).
- Nietzsche (1912).
- The Drift of Romanticism: Shelburne Essays; Eighth Series (1913).
- Aristocracy and Justice: Shelburne Essays; Ninth Series (1915).
- The Greek Tradition from the Death of Socrates to the Council of Chalcedon, 399 B.C.-A.D. 451, (Princeton: University Press, 1917–27, 5 vols.)
  - Platonism (1917).
  - The Religion of Plato (1921).
  - Hellenistic Philosophies (1923).
  - The Christ of the New Testament (1924).
  - Christ the Word (1927).
- With the Wits: Shelburne Essays; Tenth Series (1919).
- A New England Group and Others: Shelburne Essays; Eleventh Series (1921).
- The Demon of the Absolute; New Shelburne Essays (1928).
- The Catholic Faith (1931; rep. as Christian Mysticism: A Critique, 1932).
- The Skeptical Approach to Religion; New Shelburne Essays (1934).
- Anglicanism (1935, with Frank Leslie Cross).
- On Being Human; New Shelbourne Essays (1936).
- Pages from an Oxford Diary (1937, memoir).

Selected articles

- "A New Translation of the Arthurian Epos," The Atlantic Monthly, Vol. LXXXI, No. 484, 1898.
- "The Wholesome Revival of Byron," The Atlantic Monthly, Vol. LXXXI, No. 494, 1898.
- "Santayana's 'Poetry and Religion'," The Harvard Graduates' Magazine, Vol. IX, 1901.
- "Literary American," The Independent, Vol. LIII, 1901.
- "The Dicast," The Independent, Vol. LIII, 1901.
- "Brother Jasper and Galileo," The Independent, Vol. LIII, 1901.
- "The Miracle of the Stone and the Mountain," The Independent, Vol. LIII, 1901.
- "Books and Nature," The Independent, Vol. LIII, 1901.
- "The Geology of the Soul," The Independent, Vol. LIII, 1901.
- "The Sign of the Club," The Independent, Vol. LIII, 1901.
- "Wealth and Culture," The Independent, Vol. LIV, 1902.
- "Our Benevolent Feudalism," The Independent, Vol. LIV, 1902.
- "Two Unpublished Stanzas of Goldsmith (?)," The Independent, Vol. LIV, 1902.
- "A New Intrusion of Pedantry," The Nation, Vol. LXXVII, 1903.
- "What Are Our Classical Men Doing?," The Independent, Vol. LV, 1903.
- "Pedantry and Dilettantism in the Classics," The Independent, Vol. LV, 1903.
- "A Romance Attributed to John Milton," The Independent, Vol. LV, 1903.
- "Classical Teachers and the Public," The Independent, Vol. LV, 1903.
- "Zola's Truth," The Independent, Vol. LV, 1903.
- "Translation," The Independent, Vol. LV, 1903.
- "The Carlyles," The Independent, Vol. LV, 1903.
- "English Literature," The Independent, Vol. LV, 1903.
- "Hawthorne: Looking Before and After," The Independent, Vol. LVI, 1904.
- "The Agamemnon at Harvard," The Harvard Graduates' Magazine, Vol. XV, 1906.
- "The Value of Academic Degrees," The Bookman, Vol. XXIII, 1906.
- "The Teaching of the Classics," The Independent, Vol. LXV, 1908.
- "Milton After Three Hundred Years," The Nation, Vol. LXXXVII, 1908.
- "The Dualism of Saint Augustine," The Hibbert Journal, Vol. VI, 1908.
- "Thomas Traherne," The Nation, Vol. LXXXVIII, 1909.
- "The New Stage of Pragmatism," The Nation, Vol. LXXXVIII, 1909.
- "News for Bibliophiles," The Nation, Vol. XCV, 1912.
- "Herrick," The Nation, Vol. XCV, 1912.
- "Jane Austen," The Nation, Vol. XCVII, 1913.
- "The Lust of Empire," The Nation, Vol. XCIX, 1914.
- "The New Morality," The Unpopular Review, Vol. I, No. 1, 1914.
- "Natural Aristocracy," The Unpopular Review, Vol. I, No. 2, 1914.
- "Gentle Uses of a Dictionary," The Nation, Vol. C, 1915.
- "Harper's Song in 'Wilhelm Meister'," The Nation, Vol. C, 1915.
- "Some Parallels in Henry Vaughan," The Nation, Vol. CI, 1915.
- "Children's Books," The Nation, Vol. CI, 1915.
- "The Parmenides of Plato," The Philosophical Review, Vol. XXV, 1916.
- "Henry Vaughan," The Nation, Vol. CII, 1916.
- "The Old Education and the New," The Nation, Vol. CII, 1916.
- "Rabindranath Tagore," The Nation, Vol. CIII, 1916.
- "The Problem of Poverty," The Unpopular Review, Vol. VI, No. 12, 1916.
- "Taste and Tradition," The Unpopular Review, Vol. VIII, No. 15, 1917.
- "Henry Adams," The Unpopular Review, Vol. X, No. 20, 1918.
- "Theodore Dreiser, Philosopher," The Weekly Review, Vol. II, 1920.
- "A Tory Unabashed," The Weekly Review, Vol. III, 1920.
- "Dancing the Moral Tight-Rope," The Weekly Review, Vol. III, 1920.
- "A 19th Century Ishmaelite," The Villager, Vol. IV, 1920.
- "A Lover of Lords and Books," The Villager, Vol. IV, 1920.
- "Progress," The Villager, Vol. IV, 1921.
- "Dr. Freud Bowdlerized," The Weekly Review, Vol. IV, 1921.
- "The New Thought," The Villager, Vol. V, 1922.

Miscellany

- Prefatory note to The Complete Poetical Works of Lord Byron (1905).
- Introduction to The Private Papers of Henry Ryecroft, by George Gissing (1913).
- Commemorative Tribute to Henry Adams (1920).
- "Religion and Social Discontent." In: Christianity and Problems of Today (1922).
