= New humanism (literature) =

"New Humanism" was a term applied to a theory of literary criticism, together with its consequences for culture and political thought, developed around 1900 by the American scholar Irving Babbitt and the American literary critic and essayist Paul Elmer More. Babbitt's book Literature and the American College (1908) first gave it a definite form; it was aimed at a perceived gap between the ideals of liberal arts colleges, and university education as it actually existed.

Babbitt himself did not accept the qualification new as applied to his humanism, which became influential as a strand of conservative thought in the following years, up to the 1930s. Other authors associated with the New Humanist group included George Roy Elliott (1883–1963), Norman Foerster (1887–1972) and Stuart Pratt Sherman (1881–1926). Numerous attacks came from outside, especially during the 1920s.

This group was also at times known as The Nation criticism, from More's time editing The Nation from 1909. The adoption by Seward Collins of its philosophy, or some trappings, in his publication The Bookman did something to tarnish it, in a way that external critics had up until then failed to do. Some of the members renounced the approach.

== Criticism ==
From, Exile's Return by Malcolm Cowley;

"Years later, during the controversy over the New Humanism, I read several books by Professor Irving Babbitt, the founder of the school, and found myself carried back into the atmosphere of the classroom. Babbitt and his disciples liked to talk about poise, proportionality, the imitation of great models, decorum and the Inner Check. Those too were leisureclass ideals and I decided that they were simply the student virtues rephrased in loftier language. The truth was that the New Humanism grew out of Eastern university life, where it flourished as in a penthouse garden."
