= Irving Babbitt =

American journalist

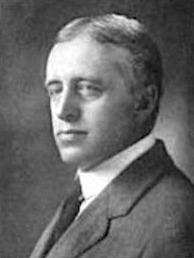
- Born: August 2, 1865; Dayton, Ohio, U.S.
- Died: July 15, 1933 (aged 67); Cambridge, Massachusetts, U.S.
- Education: Harvard College
- Occupations: Academic, literary critic
- Known for: Founding New Humanism
- Spouse: Dora May Drew (m. 1900)
- Children: 2

Irving Babbitt (August 2, 1865 – July 15, 1933) was an American academic and literary critic, noted for his founding role in a movement that became known as the New Humanism, a significant influence on literary discussion and conservative thought in the period between 1910 and 1930. He was a cultural critic in the tradition of Matthew Arnold and a consistent opponent of romanticism, as represented by the writings of Jean-Jacques Rousseau. Politically he can, without serious distortion, be called a follower of Aristotle and Edmund Burke. He was an advocate of classical humanism but also offered an ecumenical defense of religion. His humanism implied a broad knowledge of various moral and religious traditions. His book Democracy and Leadership (1924) is regarded as a classic text of political conservatism. Babbitt is regarded as a major influence over American cultural and political conservatism.

== Early career ==
Babbitt was born in Dayton, Ohio, the son of Augusta (Darling) and Edwin Dwight Babbitt. He moved with his family over much of the USA while a young child. He was brought up from age 11 in Madisonville, a neighborhood in Cincinnati, Ohio. He entered Harvard College in 1885. On graduation in 1889 he took a post teaching classics at the College of Montana. After two years, he went to study in France, at the École Pratique des Hautes-études linked to the Sorbonne. There he studied Pali literature and Buddhism, for a year. Then he took a master's degree at Harvard, including Sanskrit.

== Harvard ==
At this point, he moved away from a career as a classical scholar, taking a teaching position at Williams College in romance languages — just for one year, as it turned out. He then was offered in 1894 an instructor's position, again at Harvard, in French. He was to stay at Harvard, rising from the ranks to become a full professor of French literature in 1912. He is credited with introducing the study of comparative literature there.

He was elected a fellow of the American Academy of Arts and Sciences in 1921.

The position of Irving Babbitt Professor of Comparative Literature was endowed by Harvard University in 1960 and awarded to its first recipient, Harry Levin. The National Humanities Institute runs an Irving Babbitt Project.

== New Humanism ==
It was in the early 1890s that he first allied himself with Paul Elmer More in developing the core doctrines that were to constitute what he called the "New Humanism". In 1895 he gave a lecture What is Humanism?, which announced his attack on Rousseau. At the time, Babbitt had switched out of classical studies. He would later declare his opposition to contemporary textual and philological scholarship, associated with German scholarship, as a finite task, which he was unhappy to see placed above teaching based on what he felt was the "eternal" moral and spiritual content of literary masterpieces. His ideas, and More's, were characteristically written as short pieces or essays that were later gathered into books. Babbitt's Literature and the American College, although assembled from writings already circulated, caused a stir when published in 1908.

He continued to publish in the same vein, often denouncing authors from his avowed specialty, French literature. He also criticized Francis Bacon and denounced literary naturalism and utilitarianism.

His central emphasis was on the individual moral character and human reason. He put stress on self-discipline and the need to control impulses seeking liberation from all restraints. He opposed naturalism on the grounds that it emphasizes the dominance of external natural forces over the strength of character and individual conscience. He denounced romanticism; and especially its chief propagator, Jean-Jacques Rousseau. He warned that Rousseau was the chief negative influence over modern culture. He opposed overt sentimentalism, celebration of human perfection and utopian thinking of romanticism. His views were in the tradition of classical pre-romantic literature.

== Democracy and Leadership ==
In 1924, Babbitt published, which is perhaps his best-known work; Democracy and Leadership. The book deals with his political views from his humanistic outlook. In it, he discussed and criticized political theories which derive from naturalism. Babbitt criticized two sides of naturalistic thought–mechanistic or utilitarian side, propagated by Francis Bacon and the sentimental side, represented by Jean-Jacques Rousseau. Babbitt attacked both for giving too much importance to forces of nature and unrestrained human passion and impulses; while ignoring the fundamental importance of individual conscience and moral character. He rejected historical deterministic theories from Saint Augustine to Bossuet. He stated high moral character as the most important quality of leadership in a democratic society. He warned against the dangers of unchecked majoritarianism in democracies.

Babbitt's political views are in the tradition of classical liberalism, from Aristotle and Edmund Burke. His book is considered as a classic conservative political work. Conservative scholars like Russell Kirk were influenced by Babbitt. Kirk praised the book as "...one of the few truly important works of political thought."

His political views originated from his belief in the supreme importance of moral character. He rejected socio-political activism and sentimentalism as no substitute for individual conscience and character. He put stress on individual responsibility and opposed "everybody's interference in everybody else's business."

== Criticism, influence and legacy ==
He met with increasing criticism down the years: those provoked into announcing their opposition included R. P. Blackmur, Oscar Cargill, Ernest Hemingway, Harold Laski, Sinclair Lewis, H. L. Mencken, Joel Elias Spingarn, Allen Tate, and Edmund Wilson. In the case of Mencken, at least, Babbitt gave as good as he got; he branded Mencken's writing as "intellectual vaudeville."

He had an early influence on T. S. Eliot, a student of his at Harvard. Eliot in his 1926 essay The Humanism of Irving Babbitt, a review of Democracy and Leadership, had become equivocal, finding Babbitt's humanism not sufficiently receptive to Christian dogma; his position vis-à-vis religion is still debated.

The identifiable figures of the New Humanist movement, besides Babbitt and More, were mostly influenced by Babbitt on a personal level and included G. R. Elliott (1883–1963), Norman Foerster (1887–1972), Frank Jewett Mather (1868–1953), Robert Shafer (1889–1956) and Stuart Pratt Sherman (1881–1926). Of these, Sherman moved away early, and Foerster, a star figure, later reconsidered and veered towards the New Criticism.

More peripherally, Yvor Winters and the Great Books movement are supposed to have taken something from New Humanism. Scholars influenced by Babbitt include Milton Hindus, Russell Kirk, Nathan Pusey, Peter Viereck, Richard M. Weaver, Claes G. Ryn, and George Will. A relationship has been traced between Babbitt and Gordon Keith Chalmers, Walter Lippmann, Louis Mercier, and Austin Warren; however, claims of influence where it is not acknowledged are not easy to sustain, and Babbitt was known to advise against public tributes.

From a position of high prominence in the 1920s, having the effective but questionable support of The Bookman, New Humanism experienced a drop from fashionable status after Babbitt died in 1933 and modernist and progressive currents became increasingly dominant in American intellectual, cultural and political life. By the 1940s its enemies pronounced it nearly extinct, but Babbitt continued to exercise a partly hidden influence, and a marked revival of interest was seen in the 1980s and ensuing decades. Babbitt is often name-checked in discussions on cultural conservatism. Babbitt's influence in China, which was notable in the 1930s and 40s, is again on the rise with the publication of many books by or about Babbitt.

== Personal life ==
Babbitt married Dora May (née Drew) Babbitt on June 12, 1900, with whom he had two children: Esther and Edward Sturges.

He died at his home in Cambridge, Massachusetts on July 15, 1933.

== Bibliography ==
- Literature and the American College (1908)
- The New Laokoön (1910)
- The Masters of Modern French Criticism (1912)
- Rousseau and Romanticism (1919)
- Democracy and Leadership (1924)
- On Being Creative (1932)
- The Dhammapada (1936) – translator, with essay
- Spanish Character, and other essays (1940) – reprinted as Character & Culture: Essays on East and West
- Representative Writings (ed. George A. Panichas, 1981)
