= Robert Nisbet =

American sociologist (1913–1996)

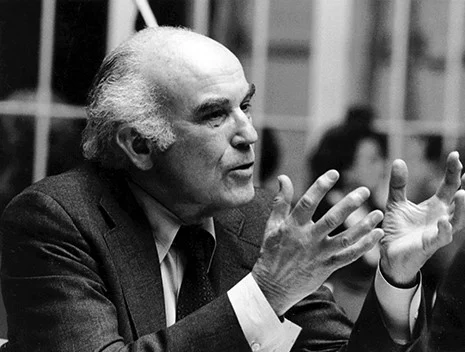
Robert Alexander Nisbet

Robert Alexander Nisbet (/ˈnɪzbɪt/; September 30, 1913 – September 9, 1996) was an American sociologist, a professor at the University of California, Berkeley, vice-chancellor at the University of California, Riverside, and an Albert Schweitzer Professor at Columbia University.

== Life ==
Nisbet was born in Los Angeles in 1913. He was raised with his three brothers and one sister in the small California community of Maricopa, where his father managed a lumber yard. His studies at University of California, Berkeley culminated in a Ph.D. in sociology in 1939. His thesis was supervised by Frederick J. Teggart. At Berkeley, "Nisbet found a powerful defense of intermediate institutions in the conservative thought of 19th-century Europe. Nisbet saw in thinkers like Edmund Burke and Alexis de Tocqueville—then all but unknown in American scholarship—an argument on behalf of what he called 'conservative pluralism.'" He joined the faculty there in 1939.

After serving in the United States Army during World War II, when he was stationed on Saipan in the Pacific Theatre, Nisbet founded the Department of Sociology at Berkeley, and was briefly chairman. Nisbet left an embroiled Berkeley in 1953 to become a dean at the University of California, Riverside, and later a vice-chancellor. Nisbet remained in the University of California system until 1972, when he left for the University of Arizona at Tucson. Soon after, he was appointed to the Albert Schweitzer Chair at Columbia. He was elected to the American Academy of Arts and Sciences in 1972 and the American Philosophical Society in 1973.

On retiring from Columbia in 1978, Nisbet continued his scholarly work for eight years at the American Enterprise Institute in Washington, D.C. In 1988, President Ronald Reagan asked him to deliver the Jefferson Lecture in Humanities, sponsored by the National Endowment for the Humanities. He died, at 82, in Washington, DC.

== Ideas ==
Nisbet's first important work, The Quest for Community (New York: Oxford University Press, [1953] 1969), claimed that modern social science's individualism denied an important human drive toward community as it left people without the aid of their fellows to combat the centralizing power of the nation-state. New York Times columnist Ross Douthat called it "arguably the 20th century's most important work of conservative sociology". Nisbet began his career as a leftist but later confessed a conversion to a philosophical conservatism. While he consistently described himself as a conservative, he also "famously defended abortion rights and publicly attacked the foreign policy of President Ronald Reagan".

Nisbet contributed to Chronicles. He was especially concerned with tracing the history and impact of the Idea of Progress. He challenged conventional sociological theories about progress and modernity, insisting on the negative consequences of the loss of traditional forms of community, a process that he believed was greatly accelerated by World War I. According to British sociologist Daniel Chernilo, for Nisbet, "The sociological interest in the formation of modern society lies in whether and how it can re-invigorate forms of communal life and, if not, in understanding what will be the consequences of such failure." Nisbet, thus, "inverts what had been until then the mainstream proposition that society was more important, both historically and normatively, than community". Chernilo also critically observed that Nisbet's "argument on the Great War [World War I] that marks the transition from community to society offers a one-sided view of the historical process as moving unequivocally towards a decaying condition".

== Bibliography ==
=== Books ===
- 1953. The Quest for Community: A Study in the Ethics of Order and Freedom ISBN 978-1684516360
- 1966. The Sociological Tradition
- 1968. Tradition and Revolt: Historical and Sociological Essays
- 1969. Social Change and History: Aspects of the Western Theory of Development
- 1970. The Social Bond: An Introduction to the Study of Society
- 1971. The Degradation of the Academic Dogma: The University in America, 1945–1970
- 1976. Sociology as an Art Form
- 1973. The Social Philosophers: Community and Conflict in Western Thought
- 1974. The Sociology of Emile Durkheim
- 1975. The Twilight of Authority
- 1980. History of the Idea of Progress
- 1983. Prejudices: A Philosophical Dictionary
- 1986. The Making of Modern Society
- 1986. Conservatism: Dream and Reality
- 1988 The Present Age: Progress and Anarchy in Modern America ISBN 0060159022
- 1988. Roosevelt and Stalin: The Failed Courtship
- 1992. Teachers and Scholars: A Memoir of Berkeley in Depression and War

=== Articles ===
- "The Twilight of Authority" (PDF). The Public Interest. September 1969. pp. 3–9.
- "Foreign Policy and the American Mind". Commentary (September 1961, pp. 194–203).
- "The Nemesis of Authority" (PDF). The Intercollegiate Review. Winter–Spring 1972.
- "The New Despotism". Commentary (July 1976).
- "Conservatives and Libertarians: Uneasy Cousins". Modern Age. Winter 1980.
- "Roosevelt and Stalin (I)" (PDF). Modern Age. Spring 1986.
- "Roosevelt and Stalin (II)" (PDF). Modern Age. Summer–Fall 1986.
- "Still Questing" (PDF). The Intercollegiate Review. Fall 1993.
- "Was There an American Revolution?," The American Conservative, August 3, 2012.
- "social science," Britannica Academic. (Primary Contributor)
