= Conservatism in the United States =

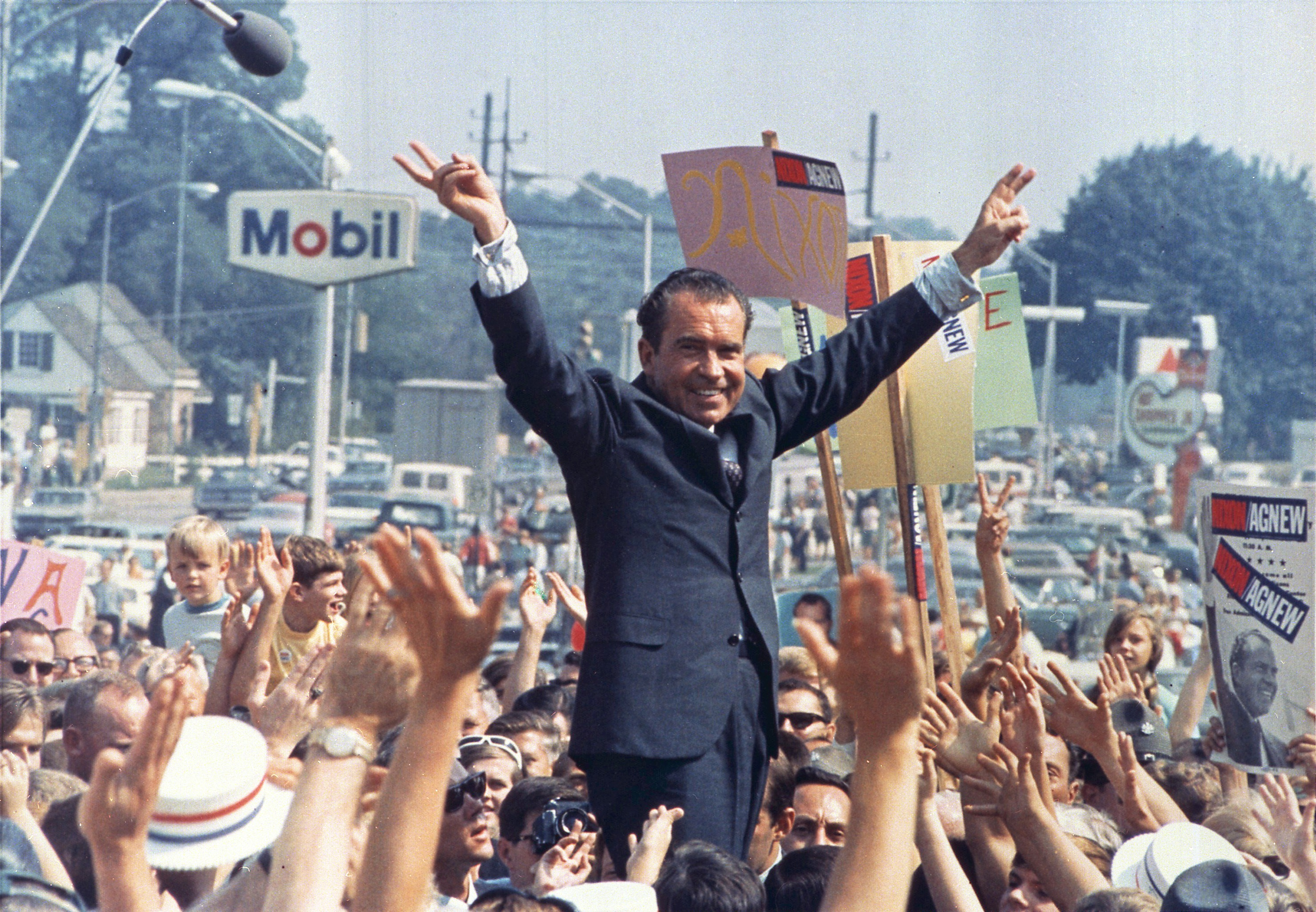
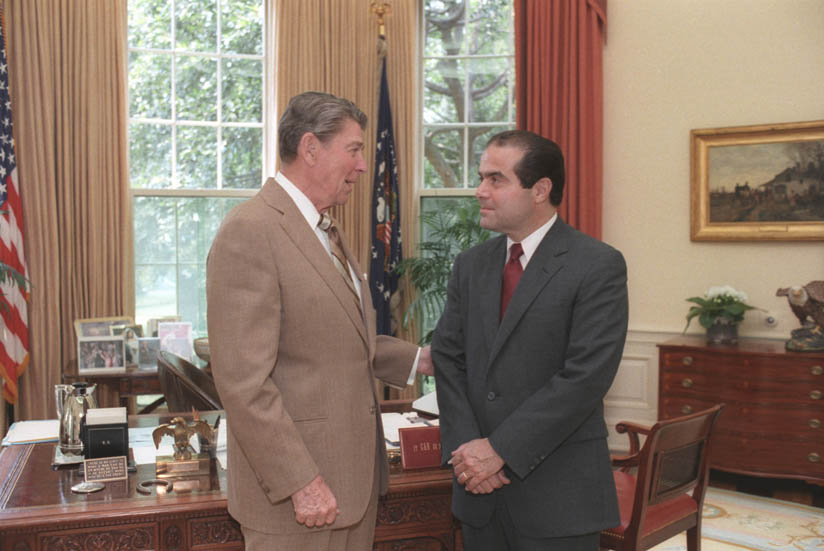
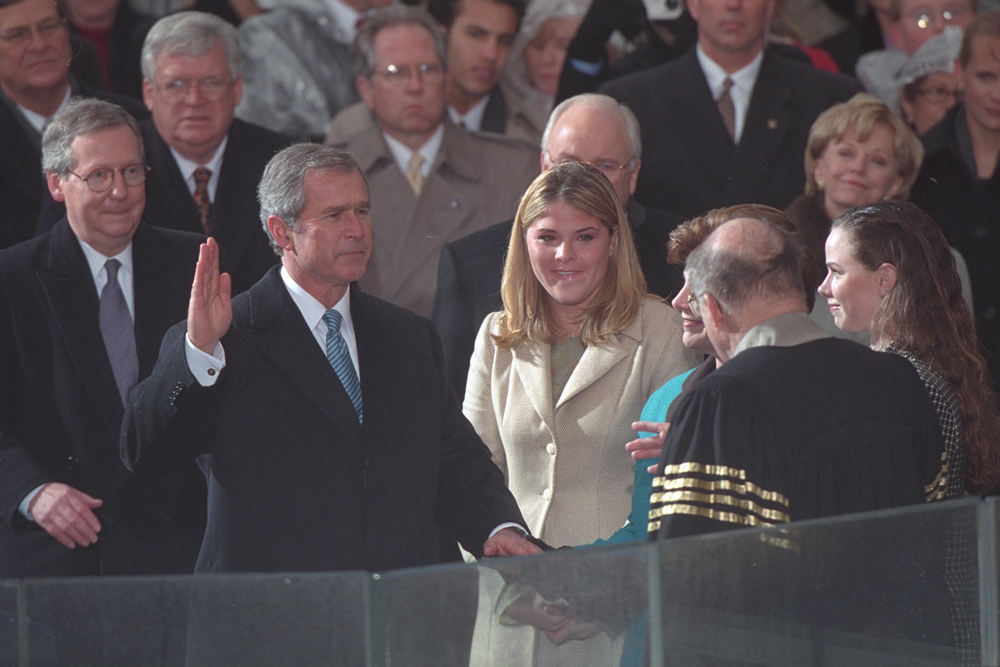
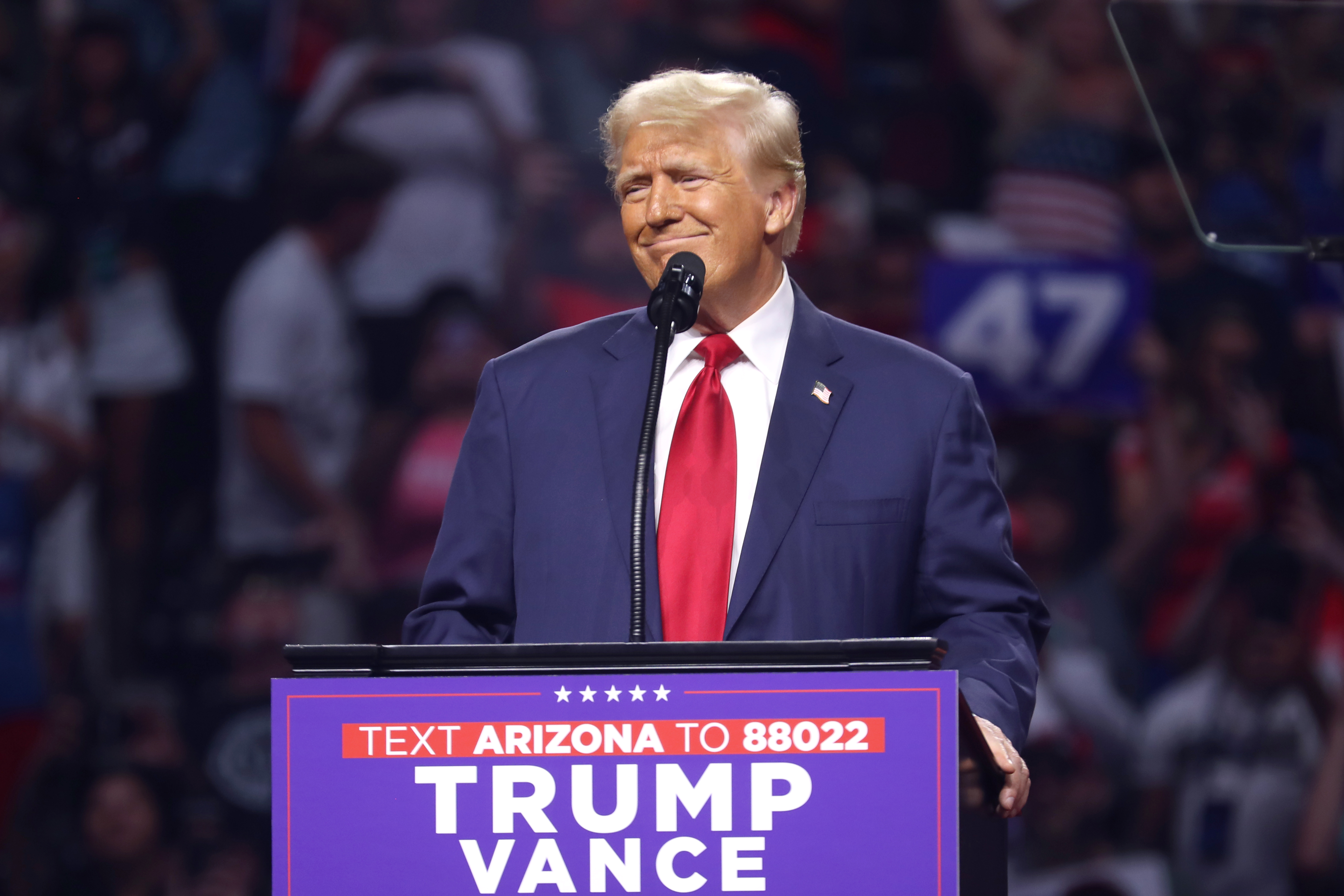
Clockwise from top:
Former Vice President Richard Nixon campaigning in Paoli, Pennsylvania, 1968; President Ronald Reagan meeting with United States Supreme Court nominee Antonin Scalia in the Oval Office, 1986;George W. Bush's inauguration in 2001; Donald Trump at a rally in 2024

Conservatism in the United States consists of right-leaning and right-wing ideological traditions that have collectively rivaled the liberal and progressive U.S. political traditions. Since the early 20th century, the American conservative tradition has generally been identified with the Republican Party, as opposed to the predominantly modern liberal orientation of its rival, the Democratic Party. Traditional American conservatism is characterized by a belief in individualism, traditionalism, capitalism, republicanism, and limited federal governmental power in relation to U.S. states. However, developments since 2010 have shifted it towards right-wing populist and national-conservative themes, owing in a large part to Trumpism.

Traditionally, American conservatives receive support from the Christian right and its interpretation of Christian values and moral absolutism, while generally opposing abortion, euthanasia, and some LGBT rights. They tend to favor economic liberalism, and are generally pro-business and pro-capitalism, while more strongly opposing communism and labor unions than liberals and social democrats. The shifts since 2020 have moved it towards national conservatism, protectionism, cultural conservatism, and a more realist foreign policy.

Conservatives frequently advocate strong national defense, gun rights, capital punishment, and a defense of Western culture from possible threats posed by communism, Islamism, and moral relativism. Some American conservatives question epidemiology, anthropogenic climate change, and evolution, and do so more frequently than moderates or liberals.

== Overview ==
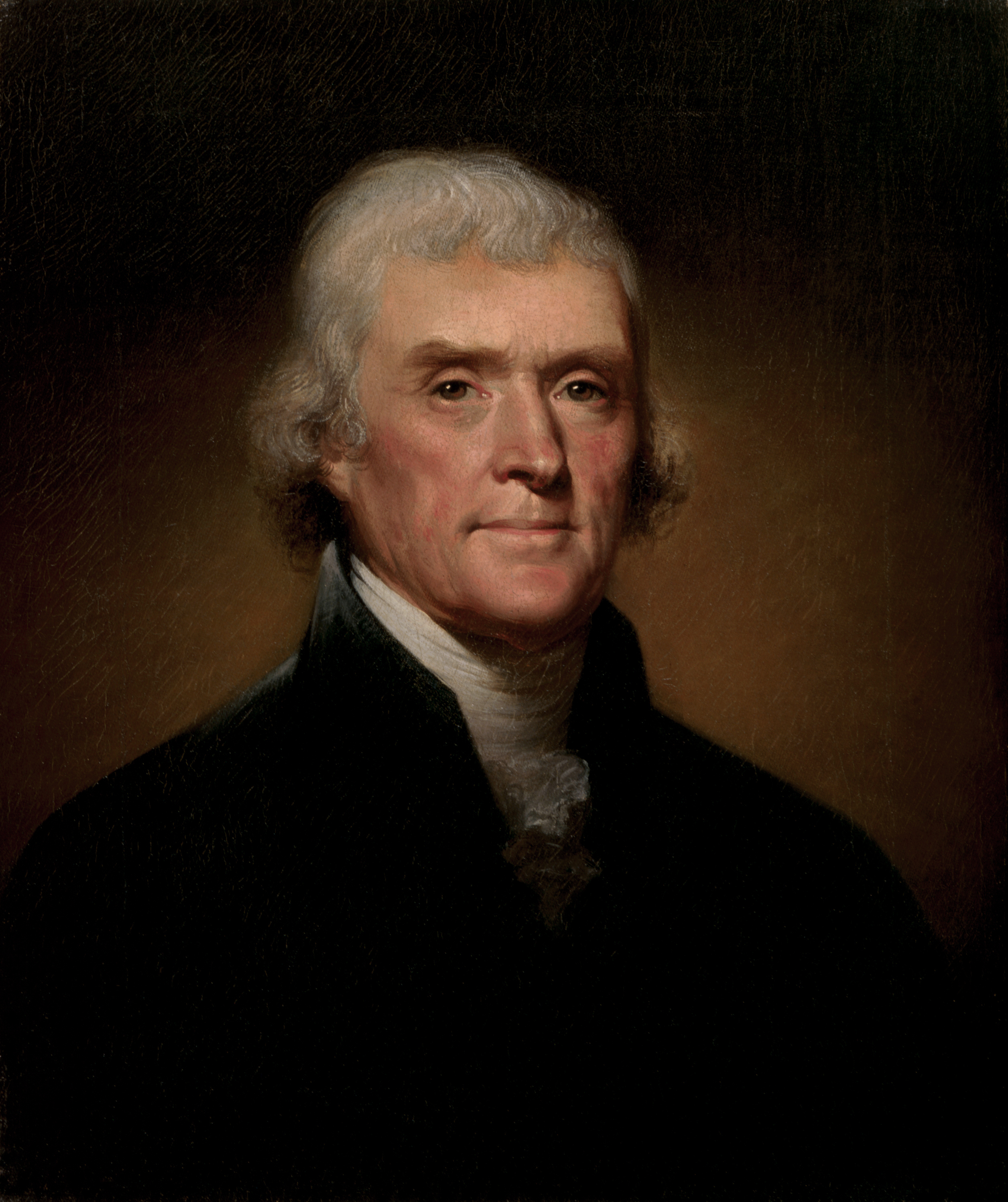
Thomas Jefferson, the primary author of the Declaration of Independence, whose phrase "all men are created equal, that they are endowed by their Creator with certain unalienable Rights, that among these are life, liberty and the pursuit of happiness", is viewed as a foundational guiding principle by most American conservatives.

In the United States, conservatism is often defined differently from how it is viewed and described in Europe and other regions of the world. Following the American Revolution, Americans rejected the core ideals of European conservatism, including landed nobility, hereditary monarchy, established churches, and powerful armies.

Conservatives in the United States historically view individual liberty within the bounds of conservative values as the fundamental trait of democracy. They typically believe in a balance between federal government and states' rights. Apart from some right-libertarians, American conservatives tend to favor strong action in areas they believe to be within the government's legitimate jurisdiction, particularly national defense and law enforcement, while opposing government intervention in social issues such as healthcare and the environment. Social conservatives, including many religious organizations and leaders, often oppose abortion and same-sex marriage. On education policy, American conservatives often support prayer in public schools and school choice, which enhances parents' choice between public, private, and parochial primary education.

Like most U.S. political ideologies, American conservatism is founded on the principle of republicanism, which rejects aristocratic and monarchical government. American conservatives see the Declaration of Independence, authored during the Revolutionary War largely by Thomas Jefferson and unanimously adopted by the Second Continental Congress in Philadelphia in 1776, as an ideological foundation, especially the Declaration's phrase that, "all men are created equal, that they are endowed by their Creator with certain unalienable Rights, that among these are life, liberty and the pursuit of happiness". Most American conservatives similarly see the U.S. Constitution, which established a federal republic under the rule of law and was ratified by delegates to the Constitutional Convention in 1789, as a doctrine and guiding principle.

Conservative philosophy also derives in part from the classical liberal tradition of the 17th, 18th, and 19th centuries, which advocated laissez-faire economics and was supportive of economic freedom and deregulation. Louis Hartz, a Harvard University political scientist and historian, has argued that socialism has failed to become established in the United States because of Americans' widespread acceptance of an enduring, underlying Lockean consensus.

Patrick Allitt, an Emory University history professor, and political theorist Russell Kirk have asserted that conservative principles have played a major role in U.S. politics and culture since 1776 but argue that an organized conservative movement with an identifiable ideology and set of beliefs did not emerge in the U.S. East until at least the 1950s. Movement conservatism has its base in the Republican Party, which has adopted conservative policies since the 1950s. Beginning in the 1930s and continuing through the mid-1960s, Southern Democrats also were largely conservative. In 1937, they formed the conservative coalition in the U.S. Congress, and Southern conservatives have mostly been heavily Republican since the late 20th century.

== History ==
=== American Revolution ===
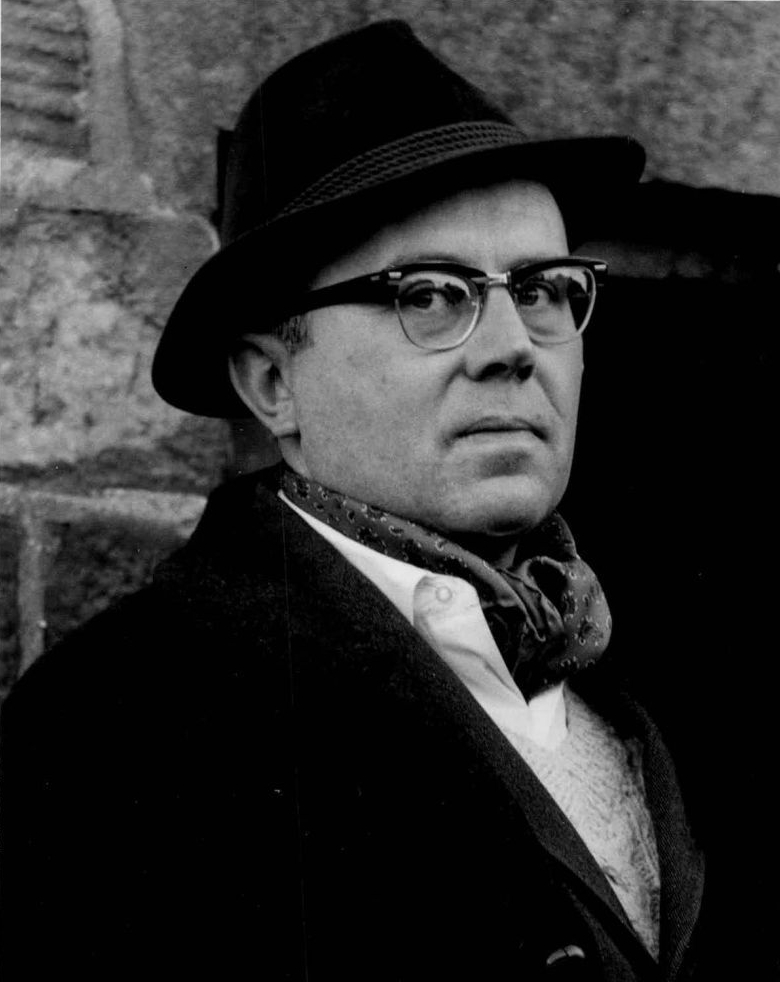
Russell Kirk, whose 1953 book The Conservative Mind traced the origins of American conservativism back to the philosophy of Edmund Burke and the Anglo-American tradition

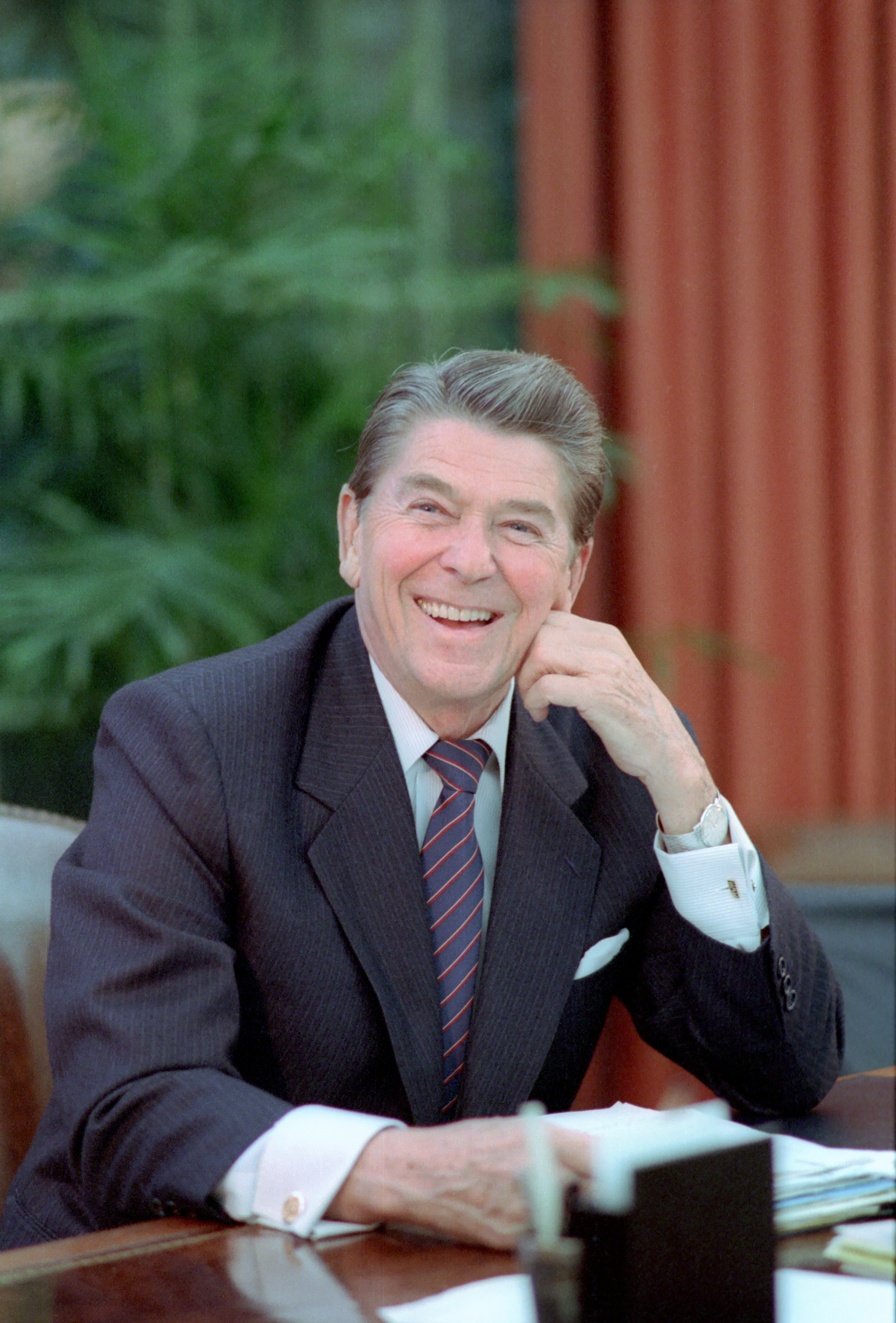
During the Reagan era, American conservatives formed the Three Leg School, a coalition of social, fiscal, and anti-communist foreign policy and national security conservatives.

Conservatism in the United States has never been represented by a national political party called the Conservative Party, as exists in Canada, the United Kingdom, and other nations. In American politics, however, conservatism has been the predominant guiding ideology of the Republican Party since at least the 1960s, and American conservatism also exists as a force in American politics, media, academia and culture.

Both major U.S. political parties support republicanism and the classical liberal ideals on which the country was founded in 1776, which include an emphasis on liberty, the rule of law, the consent of the governed, and that all men were created equal, principles prominently articulated in the Declaration of Independence. Embrace of these principles by the Thirteen Colonies during the colonial era ultimately led a significant percent of Americans to conclude that these principles could never exist as long as they remained part of British America, governed by the Kingdom of Great Britain. This recognition grew in popularity as the American Revolution developed, leading the Second Continental Congress to ultimately embrace the cause of independence, which was secured after prevailing in the eight-year Revolutionary War against the British.

Political conservatives have emphasized an identification with the Founding Fathers of the United States and the U.S. Constitution. Scholars of conservative political thought "generally label John Adams as the intellectual father of American conservatism". Russell Kirk points to Adams as the key Founding Father for conservatives, saying that "some writers regard him as America's most important conservative public man". In 1955, Clinton Rossiter, a professor of history at Mount Holyoke College, wrote:

Here was no lover of government by plutocracy, no dreamer of an America filled with factions and hard-packed cities. Here was a man who loved America as it was and had been, one whose life was a doughty testament to the trials and glories of ordered liberty. Here ... was the model of the American conservative.

A. Owen Aldridge places Adams "at the head of the conservative ranks in the early years of the Republic and Jefferson as the leader of the contrary liberal current." It was a fundamental doctrine for Adams that all men are subject to equal laws of morality. He held that in society, all men have a right to equal laws and treatment from the government. However, he added, "No two men are perfectly equal in person, property, understanding, activity, and virtue." Peter Viereck commented:

Hamilton, Adams, and their Federalist party sought to establish in the new world what they called a "natural aristocracy". [It was to be] based on property, education, family status, and sense of ethical responsibility... Their motive was liberty itself.

=== Differences between the American Revolution and the French Revolution ===
After Americans obtained independence with their victory in the Revolutionary War, political divisions in the U.S. have been depicted as seemingly minor compared to those in Europe, where the divide between the left and the right led to violent polarization, which began with the French Revolution in 1789.

=== 20th century ===
In contemporary American politics, no major U.S. political party has embraced ideals historically associated with European conservatism, including monarchy, an established church, or a hereditary aristocracy. In the 20th century, American conservatism emerged largely as a reaction against utopian ideas of progress and the political philosophy that emerged in Europe prior to the end of World War II in 1945. Russell Kirk, in The Conservative Mind, published in 1950, argued that the American Revolution was "a conservative reaction, in the English political tradition, against royal innovation".

=== 21st century ===
In 2009, Emory University history professor Patrick Allitt wrote that attitude, not policy, was at the core of differences between liberals and conservatives, writing:

Certain continuities can be traced through American history. The conservative 'attitude' ... was one of trusting to the past, to long-established patterns of thought and conduct, and of assuming that novelties were more likely to be dangerous than advantageous.

In 2022, Matthew Continetti of the American Enterprise Institute wrote that the American conservative movement has been fractured for a century.

== Types ==
Conservative leaders in the United States have not always represented a single school of thought, and American conservatism has evolved since it began emerging in the 1950s as one of the nation's predominant ideologies. Barry Goldwater, a U.S. Senator from Arizona, for instance, was an advocate for free enterprise in conservatism, which he made a centerpiece of his 1964 presidential campaign. Two decades later, in the 1980s, Jerry Falwell, founder of Liberty University and the Moral Majority, was primarily an advocate for traditional moral and religious social values. The history of American conservatism has also been marked by tensions and competing ideologies. During the Reagan era of the 1980s, a coalition of ideologies, known as "the Three Leg Stool" or "Fusionism', emerged, including three distinct segments of American conservatives: social conservatives, fiscal conservatives, and war hawks.

As of the 21st century, American conservatism includes several varying ideological schools of thought, though conservatives on the whole often embrace all or several of these schools. They include:

=== Constitutional conservatism ===
- Constitutional conservatism, a form of conservatism bound by the U.S. Constitution, which defends the structures of constitutionalism and enumerated powers, and the preservation of the principles of the U.S. Constitution. Chief among those principles is the defense of liberty. This form of conservatism coalesced in the Republican Party in the early 20th century, in opposition to progressivism within the party; it can also be seen being influential to the 21st-century Tea Party movement. Constitutional conservatism has also been associated with judicial originalism.

=== Fiscal conservatism ===
- Fiscal conservatism, a form of conservatism that focuses on low taxes and restrained government spending.
- Libertarian conservatism, a fusion of fiscal conservatism with libertarianism. This type emphasizes a strict interpretation of the Constitution, particularly with regard to federal power. Libertarian conservatism is constituted by a broad, sometimes conflicted, coalition including pro-business social moderates, so-called "deficit hawks", those favoring more rigid enforcement of states' rights, individual liberty activists, and many of those who place their socially liberal ideology ahead of their fiscal beliefs. This mode of thinking tends to espouse laissez-faire economics and a critical view of the federal government, its surveillance programs and its foreign military interventions. Libertarian conservatives' emphasis on personal freedom often leads them to hold social positions contrary to those of social conservatives, especially on such issues as marijuana, abortion and gay marriage. Ron Paul and his son Rand Paul have been influential proponents in the Republican presidential contests while still maintaining many socially conservative values. Fiscal conservatives and libertarians favor capitalism, individualism, limited government, and laissez-faire economics. They advocate low taxes, free markets, deregulation, privatization, and reduced government spending and government debt.

=== Foreign policy and national security conservatism ===
- National conservatism, a modern variant of conservatism and nationalism that concentrates on upholding national and cultural identity. Supporters of President Donald Trump break with this "conservative consensus, forged by Cold War politics" of "markets and moralism," The New Yorker reported in 2019. It seeks to preserve national interests, emphasizes American nationalism, strict law and order policies and social conservatism revolving around the nuclear family, opposes illegal immigration and laissez-faire or free market, economic policy in most cases. A 2019 political conference featuring "public figures, journalists, scholars, and students" dubbed this variety of conservatism "National Conservatism". Critics allege its adherents are merely attempting to wrest "a coherent ideology out of the chaos of the Trumpist moment".
- Neoconservatism, a modern form of conservatism that supports a more assertive, interventionist foreign policy aimed at promoting democracy abroad. It is tolerant of an activist government at home but is focused mostly on international affairs. Neoconservatism was first described by a group of disaffected liberals, including Irving Kristol, who defined a neoconservative as "a liberal who was mugged by reality." Although originally regarded as an approach to domestic policy, neoconservatism was ultimately embraced as a national security and foreign policy ideology and was embraced by Dick Cheney, Robert Kagan, Richard Perle, Kenneth Adelman, Irving Kristol's son Bill, and others. It was predominant in the foreign policy of George W. Bush administration's Middle East policies, which relied on aggressive military force following the September 11 attacks and which the Bush administration viewed as protecting American interests and promoting democracy. Neoconservatives largely seek to expand American ideals globally.
- Paleoconservatism, in part, a rebirth of the Old Right arising in the 1980s in reaction to neoconservatism. Paleoconservatives advocate restrictions on immigration, non-interventionist foreign policy, and opposition to multiculturalism. Most conservative factions nationwide, except some libertarians, support a unilateral foreign policy and a strong military. Most, especially libertarians, support gun ownership rights, citing the Second Amendment to the United States Constitution. The conservative movement of the 1950s attempted to bring together these divergent strands, stressing the need for unity to prevent the spread of "godless communism". It stresses tradition, especially Christian tradition and the importance to society of the traditional family. Some such as Samuel P. Huntington argue that multiracial, multiethnic, and egalitarian states are inherently unstable. Paleoconservatives are generally isolationist, and suspicious of foreign influence. The magazines Chronicles and The American Conservative are generally considered to be paleoconservative in nature. Notable paleoconservatives include Pat Buchanan and Phyllis Schlafly.

=== Social conservatism ===
- Christian conservatism, whose proponents are primarily Christian fundamentalists focused on the traditional nuclear family rooted in religion. Typical positions include the view that the United States was founded as a Christian nation rather than a secular one and that abortion should be restricted or outlawed. Many attack the profanity and sexuality prevalent in modern media and society and often oppose pornography and LGBT rights while supporting abstinence-only sex education. This faction strongly supported Reagan in the 1980 election. They intensely opposed Reagan's 1981 nomination of Sandra Day O'Connor to the Supreme Court because she supported a woman's right to abortion. However, she was confirmed unanimously.
- Related to Christian conservatism is social conservatism, which focuses on the preservation of traditional moral values, often rooted in the nuclear family and religion, that they see as threatened by secularism and moral relativism. They tend to support prayer in public schools and school vouchers for religious schools, while opposing abortion and LGBT rights. Christian conservatives include people like Jerry Falwell and Mike Huckabee.

=== Other types ===
- Traditionalist conservatism, a form of conservatism in opposition to rapid change in political and social institutions. This kind of conservatism is anti-ideological insofar as it emphasizes means (slow change) over ends (any particular form of government). To the traditionalist, whether one arrives at a right- or left-wing government is less important than whether change is effected through rule of law rather than through revolution and utopian schemes.
- Blue Dog Coalition ideology is the set of values and policies held by most conservative Democrats and the coalition that represents them. The Blue Dog Coalition and conservative Democrats in general have steadily declined as a share of the Democratic Party over time.

== Ideology and political philosophy ==
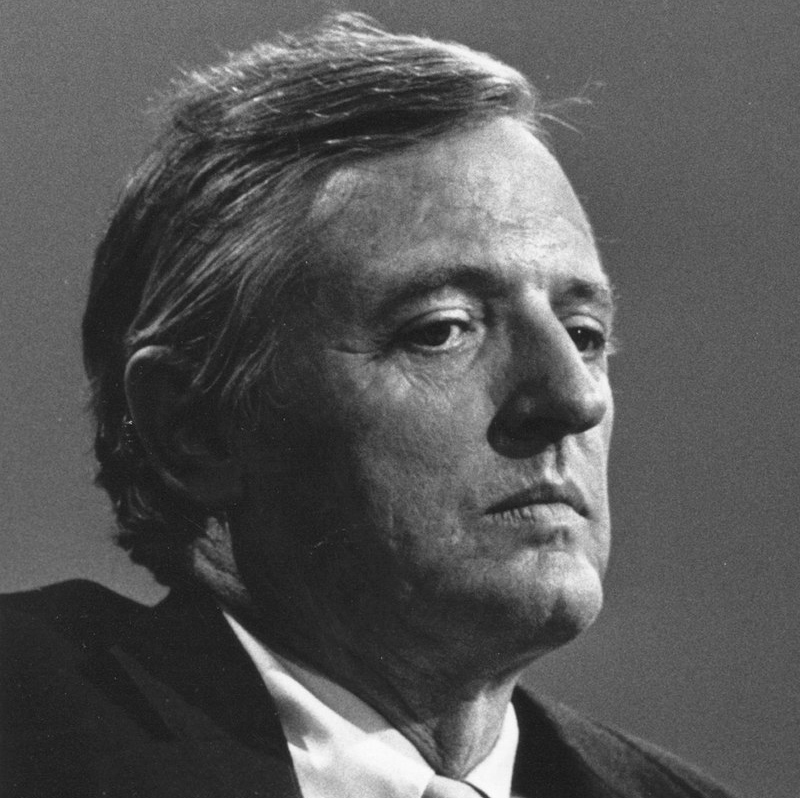
William F. Buckley Jr., an author who founded the National Review magazine in 1955. "Among our convictions: It is the job of centralized government (in peacetime) to protect its citizens' lives, liberty and property. All other activities of government tend to diminish freedom and hamper progress," Buckley wrote in the magazine's first issue.

In February 1955, in the first issue of National Review, William F. Buckley Jr. explained the standards of his magazine and articulate the beliefs of American conservatives, writing:

Among our convictions: It is the job of centralized government (in peacetime) to protect its citizens' lives, liberty and property. All other activities of government tend to diminish freedom and hamper progress. The growth of government (the dominant social feature of this century) must be fought relentlessly. In this great social conflict of the era, we are, without reservations, on the libertarian side. The profound crisis of our era is, in essence, the conflict between the Social Engineers, who seek to adjust mankind to scientific utopias, and the disciples of Truth, who defend the organic moral order. We believe that truth is neither arrived at nor illuminated by monitoring election results, binding though these are for other purposes, but by other means, including a study of human experience. On this point we are, without reservations, on the conservative side.

According to Peter Viereck, a history professor at Mount Holyoke College, American conservatism is distinctive because it was not tied to a monarchy, landed aristocracy, established church, or military elite. Instead, American conservatives were firmly rooted in American republicanism, which European conservatives opposed. They are committed, Seymour Martin Lipset, a Harvard University political science and sociology professor, said, to a belief in America's "superiority against the cold reactionary monarchical and more rigidly status-bound system of European society."

American conservatives have been heavily influenced by the classical liberal or libertarian tradition, which was expressed by Friedrich Hayek and Milton Friedman, and a major source of influence has been the Chicago school of economics. They have been strongly opposed to Keynesian economics.

Traditional conservatives largely tend to be anti-ideological, identifying with the ideals of Edmund Burke, a member of the British House of Commons and author of Reflections on the Revolution in France and several other books associated with traditional conservatism, and Russell Kirk, a traditional conservative whose 1953 book, The Conservative Mind, was an influential overview of the development of the contemporary American conservative movement, which Kirk traces back to the writings of Burke. Kirk described American conservatism as a steady flow of "prescription and prejudice"; Kirk defines his use of the word "prejudice" as an inherited wisdom over the ages, rather than any form of discrimination. The Conservative Mind was widely praised following its release, with Whittaker Chambers calling it the most important book of the 20th century.

During the second half of the 20th century, American conservatism included various cause-specific movements and was sometimes fragmented. Yet, one cause, opposition to communism, united these issue-specific causes and factions, which permitted it to begin emerging as an influential political force. American conservatives viewed communism and the Soviet Union during the Cold War as threatening in several serious ways, undermining traditionalism and order, contradicting the principles of the American Revolution, and representing a grave threat to the nation's security and preservation.

=== Economic views ===
Fiscal conservatism has ideological roots in capitalism, limited government, free enterprise, and laissez-faire economics. Fiscal conservatives typically support tax cuts, reduced government spending, free markets, deregulation, privatization, minimal government debt, and a balanced budget. They argue that low taxes produce more jobs and wealth for everyone, and, as President Grover Cleveland said, "unnecessary taxation is unjust taxation". A recent movement against the estate tax labels such a tax as a "death tax." Fiscal conservatives often argue that competition in the free market is more effective than the regulation of industry and is the most efficient way to promote economic growth. The Republican Party has taken widely varying views on protectionism and free trade throughout its history. Others, such as some libertarians and followers of Ludwig von Mises, believe all government intervention in the economy is wasteful, corrupt, and immoral.

Fiscal conservatism advocates restraint of progressive taxation and expenditure. Fiscal conservatives since the 19th century have argued that debt is a device to corrupt politics; they argue that big spending ruins the morals of the people and that a national debt creates a dangerous class of speculators. A political strategy employed by conservatives to achieve a smaller government is known as starve the beast. Conservative activist Grover Norquist, a proponent of this strategy, said, "My goal is to cut government in half in twenty-five years, to get it down to the size where we can drown it in the bathtub." The argument in favor of balanced budgets is often coupled with a belief that government welfare programs should be narrowly tailored and that tax rates should be low, which implies relatively small government institutions.

=== Views on foreign and national policies ===
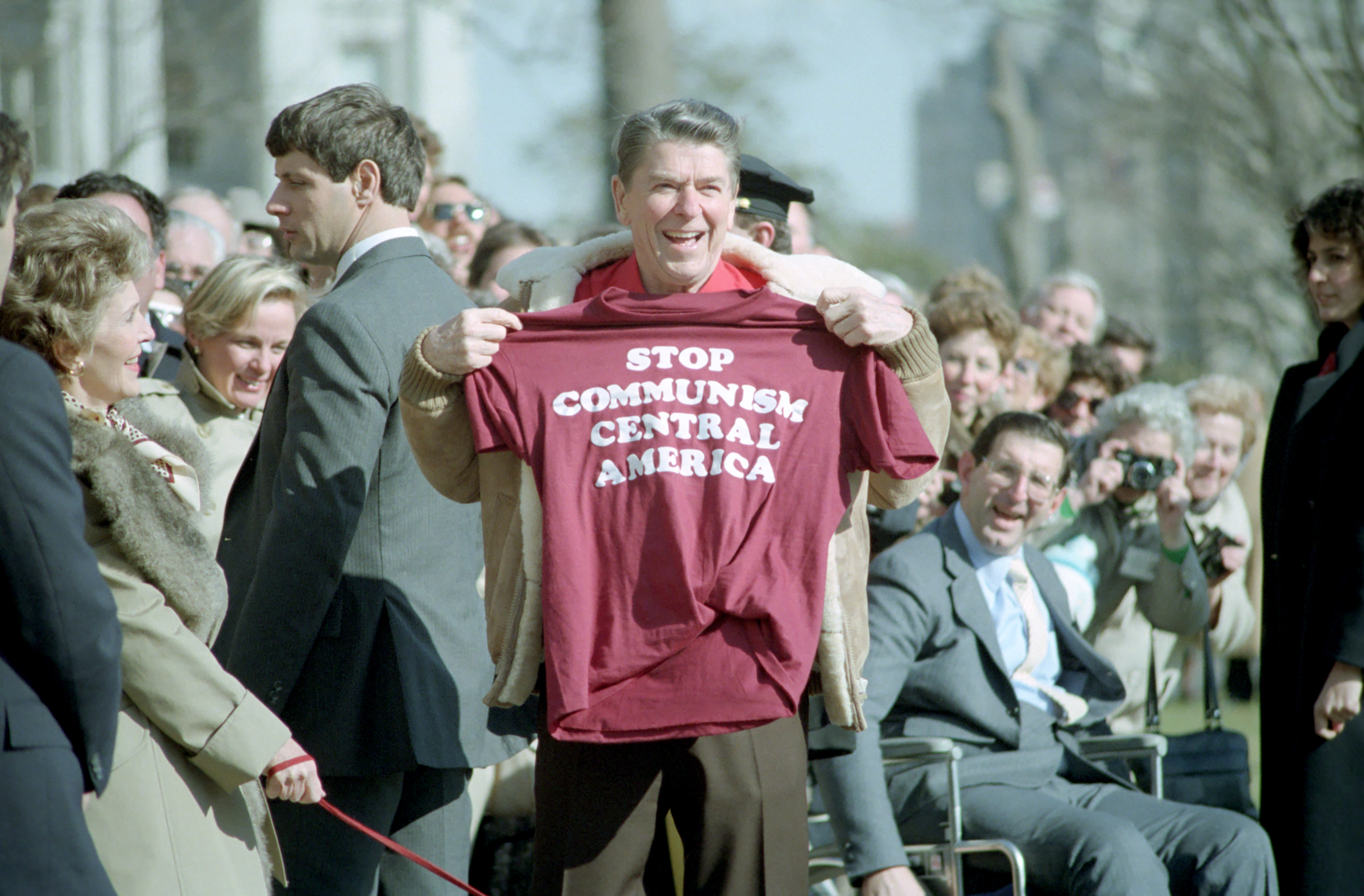
President Ronald Reagan holding a "Stop Communism Central America" t-shirt on the South Lawn of the White House in March 1986

Neoconservatism emphasizes foreign policy over domestic policy. Its supporters, mainly war hawks, advocate a more militaristic, interventionist foreign policy aimed at promoting democracy abroad, which stands in stark contrast to Paleoconservatism's more isolationist foreign policy. Neoconservatives often name communism and Islamism as the biggest threats to the free world. They often oppose the United Nations for interfering with American unilateralism.

National conservatism focuses on upholding national and cultural identity. National conservatives strongly identify with American nationalism, patriotism, and American exceptionalism, while opposing internationalism, globalism, and multiculturalism. The movement seeks to promote national interests through the preservation of traditional cultural values, restrictions on illegal immigration, and strict law and order policies.

=== Social views ===
Social conservatism in the United States is the defense of traditional family values rooted in Judeo-Christian ethics and the nuclear family. There are two overlapping subgroups of social conservatives: traditional conservatives and religious conservatives. Traditional conservatives strongly support traditional codes of conduct, especially those they feel are threatened by social change and modernization. Religious conservatives focus on conducting society based on the morals prescribed by fundamentalist religious authorities, rejecting secularism and moral relativism. In the United States, this translates into hard-line stances on moral issues, such as opposition to abortion, LGBT rights, feminism, pornography, comprehensive sex education, and recreational drug use.

Religious conservatives often assert that America is a Christian nation, calling for laws that enforce Christian morality. They often support school prayer, vouchers for parochial schools, and restricting or outlawing abortion. Social conservatives are strongest in the Southern "Bible Belt".

=== Classical liberalism ===
Historian Kathleen G. Donohue argues that classical liberalism in the United States during the 19th century had distinctive characteristics as opposed to Britain:

[A]t the center of classical liberal theory [in Europe] was the idea of laissez-faire. To the vast majority of American classical liberals, however, laissez-faire did not mean no government intervention at all. On the contrary, they were more than willing to see government provide tariffs, railroad subsidies, and internal improvements, all of which benefited producers. What they condemned was intervention in behalf of consumers.

Economic liberalism owes its creation as an ideology to the classical liberal tradition, based on philosophies advanced by Adam Smith, Friedrich Hayek, Milton Friedman, and Ludwig von Mises. Classical liberals supported free markets on moral, ideological grounds: principles of individual liberty morally dictate support for free markets. Supporters of the moral grounds for free markets include Ayn Rand and Ludwig von Mises. The liberal tradition is suspicious of government authority and prefers individual choice, and hence tends to see free market capitalism as the preferable means of achieving economic ends.

Economic liberalism borrows from two schools of thought: the classical liberals' pragmatism and the libertarians' notion of rights. Classical liberalism holds that free markets work best, while libertarianism contends that free markets are the only ethical markets. American conservatives' belief in the importance of civil society is another reason why they support a more limited role for government in the nation's economy. Alexis de Tocqueville believed extensive engagement of government in the economy makes people feel less responsible for society, and that the responsibility for society would then need to be taken over by the government, requiring higher taxes. In his book Democracy in America, published in the 19th century, Tocqueville described this as "soft oppression".

=== Veterans organizations ===
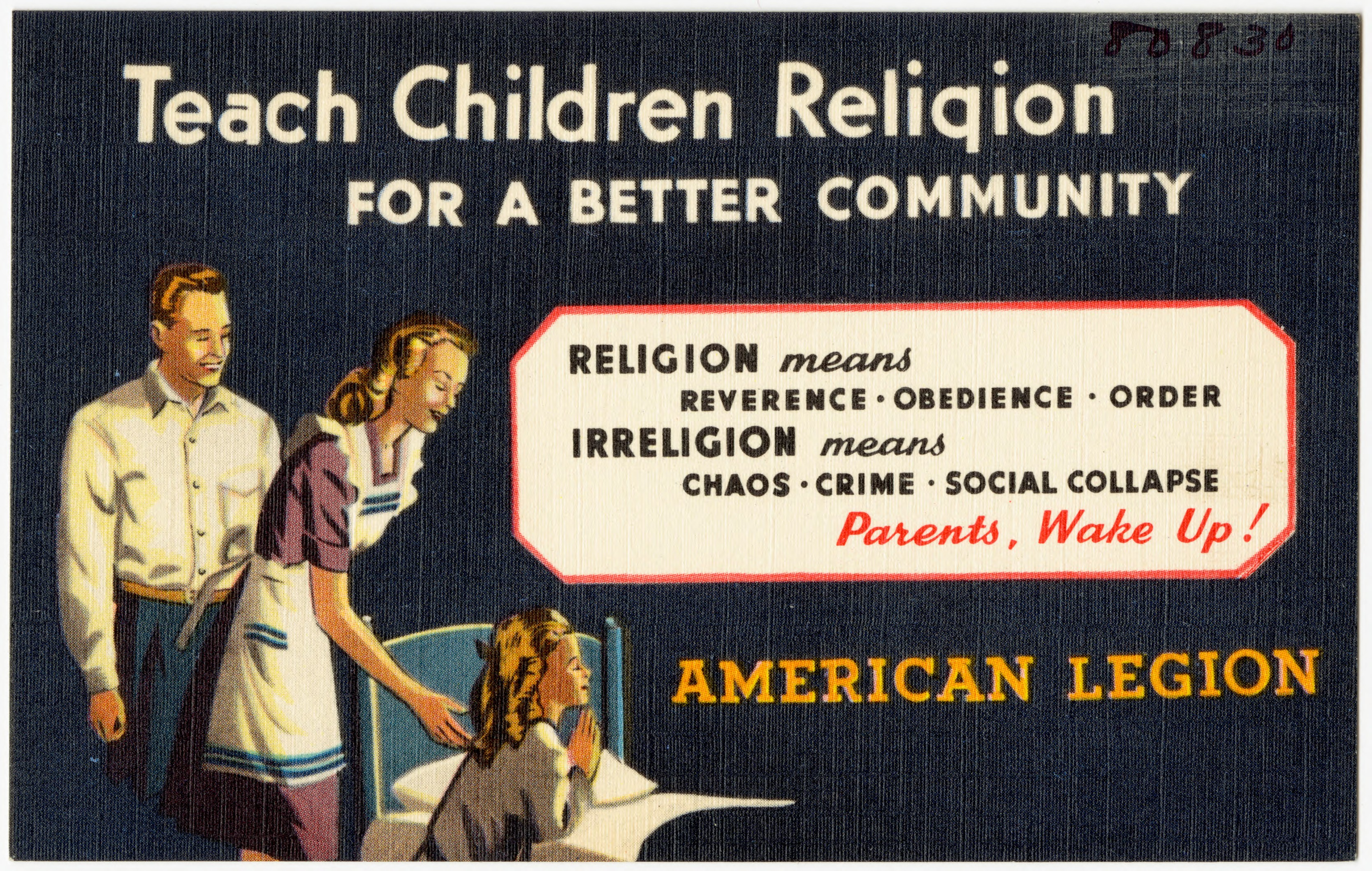
An American Legion postcard urging parents to teach religion to their children as a civic duty, c. 1930s

There have been numerous large veterans organizations in American history, most notably the Grand Army of the Republic (GAR), the Veterans of Foreign Wars, and the American Legion. They have generally tended to be conservative in politics, with an emphasis on veterans' benefits. The GAR, according to Stuart McConnell, promoted "a nationalism that honored white, native-stock, middle-class males and affirmed a prewar ideal of a virtuous, millennial Republic, based on the independent producer, entrepreneurial capitalism, and the citizen-soldier volunteer." Political conservatism has been an important aspect of the American Legion since its founding in the 1920s. The American Legion always paid very close attention to domestic subversion, especially the threat of domestic communism. But it paid little attention to foreign affairs prior to the end of World War II in 1945. It ignored the League of Nations and was hostile to the Washington Naval Conference in 1921, which rolled back the naval arms race in the 1920s. Pacifism was popular in the 1920s, and Legion locals ridiculed it and sometimes booed the Women's International League for Peace and Freedom. During World War II, it accepted the wartime alliance with Stalin against Nazi Germany.

As the Cold War commenced following the end of World War II in 1945, the Legion paid increasing attention to an anti-Soviet foreign policy. Its Counter-Subversive Activities Committee in 1946 began publishing the American Legion Firing Line, a newsletter for members that provides information on communist, fascist, and other extremist groups to its subscribers. It warned members against far-right groups such as the John Birch Society and anti-Semitic groups. By the late 1950s, the newsletter became much more interested in foreign affairs.

The Legion's policy resolutions endorsed large-scale defense spending and the deployment of powerful new weapon systems, from the hydrogen bomb in the 1950s to Reagan's Strategic Defense Initiative in the 1980s. Harry S. Truman was the first Legionnaire to occupy the White House, but he came under Legion attack for waging a limited war in Korea and not following the advice of General Douglas MacArthur in attacking China. By 1961, the Legion outright rejected the policy of containment and called for the liberation of the captive peoples in Eastern Europe. The Legion publications typically hailed Barry Goldwater, a member, as a political role model, but like Goldwater and William F. Buckley, they rejected the extremism of the John Birch Society. The Legion supported increased intervention in Vietnam and support of anti-Communist forces in Central America and Afghanistan. The Legion never saw much benefit in the United Nations and, like other conservatives, worried about a loss of American sovereignty to international bodies. The collapse of Soviet-style communism in Eastern Europe and in Russia itself saw the American Legion looking to new venues for militaristic action. It praised President George H. W. Bush's intervention in Kuwait against Iraq in 1990. After the September 11 attacks, it vigorously endorsed President George W. Bush's strategy of a global war on terror, and it supported the invasion of Iraq in 2003.

=== School prayer debate ===
In 1962, Engel v. Vitale, a U.S. Supreme Court case, banned state-written prayers in public schools. White evangelicals mostly supported that decision. However, they saw the 1963 Abington School District v. Schempp decision to ban school-sponsored Bible reading and school-organized praying of the Lord's Prayer from those schools as an affront. The Supreme Court ruled that prayer organized by the school was not voluntary since students were coerced or publicly embarrassed if they did not follow along. But Conservatives continued to call for voluntary school prayer, which is already protected under law, and repeatedly attacked the Supreme Court on this issue and on other issues, especially abortion. The evangelicals had long been avid supporters of the public schools. Now they had to reconsider their place in both schools and society as a whole. They concluded with surprising unanimity that those school decisions had done more than force evangelical belief out of America's public schools; the decisions had pushed evangelicals themselves out of America's mainstream culture. Alienated, they moved into the religious right and by 1980 were avid supporters of Ronald Reagan.

=== Reagan era ===
Ronald Reagan gives a televised address from the Oval Office, outlining his plan for tax reductions in July 1981 (excerpt).

The archetypal free market conservative administrations of the late 20th century, the Margaret Thatcher government in Britain and the Reagan administration in the U.S., both held unfettered operation of the market to be the cornerstone of contemporary modern conservatism. Thatcher privatized industries and public housing, and Ronald Reagan cut the maximum capital gains tax from 28% to 20%, though in his second term he agreed to raise it back up to 28%. Reagan also cut individual income-tax rates, lowering the maximum rate from 70% to 28%. He increased defense spending, but liberal Democrats blocked his efforts to cut domestic spending. Reagan did not control the rapid increase in federal government spending or reduce the deficit, but his record looks better when expressed as a percent of the gross domestic product. Federal revenues as a percent of the GDP fell from 19.6% in 1981 when Reagan took office to 18.3% in 1989 when he left. Federal spending fell slightly from 22.2% of the GDP to 21.2%. This contrasts with statistics from 2004, when government spending was rising more rapidly than it had in decades.

President Reagan set the conservative standard in the 1980s, which continued until the early 21st century. In the 2012 Republican presidential primary, most Republican presidential candidates "claimed to be standard bearers of Reagan's ideological legacy." Reagan solidified Republican strength by uniting its fiscal conservatives, social conservatives, and national conservatives into a conservative coalition. He did so with tax cuts, continued deregulation, a greatly increased military budget, a policy of rollback of Communism, known as the Reagan Doctrine, and appeals to family values and religious morality. The 1980s came to be known as the Reagan era.

== 21st-century policies ==
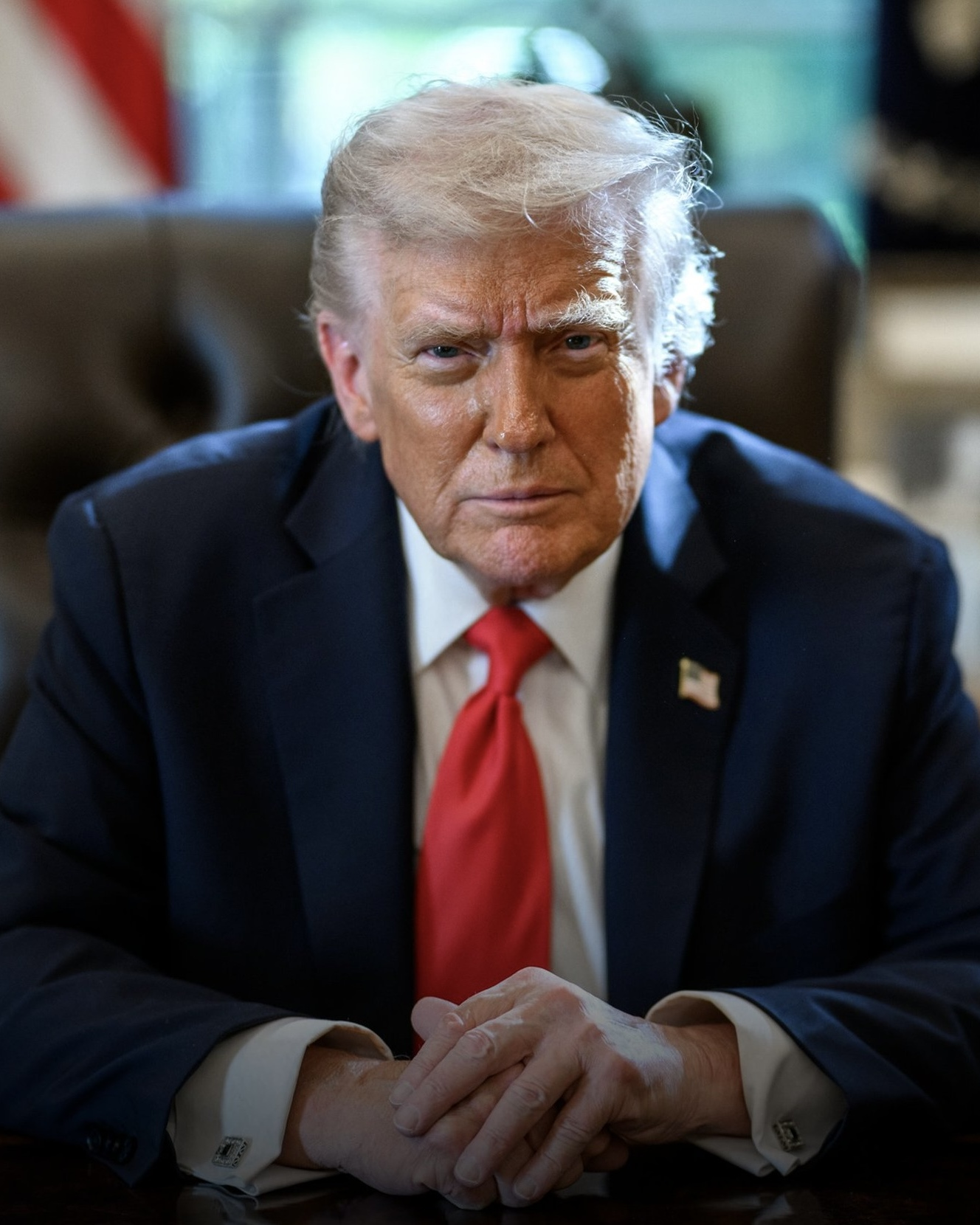
President Donald Trump (2017–2021, 2025–present)

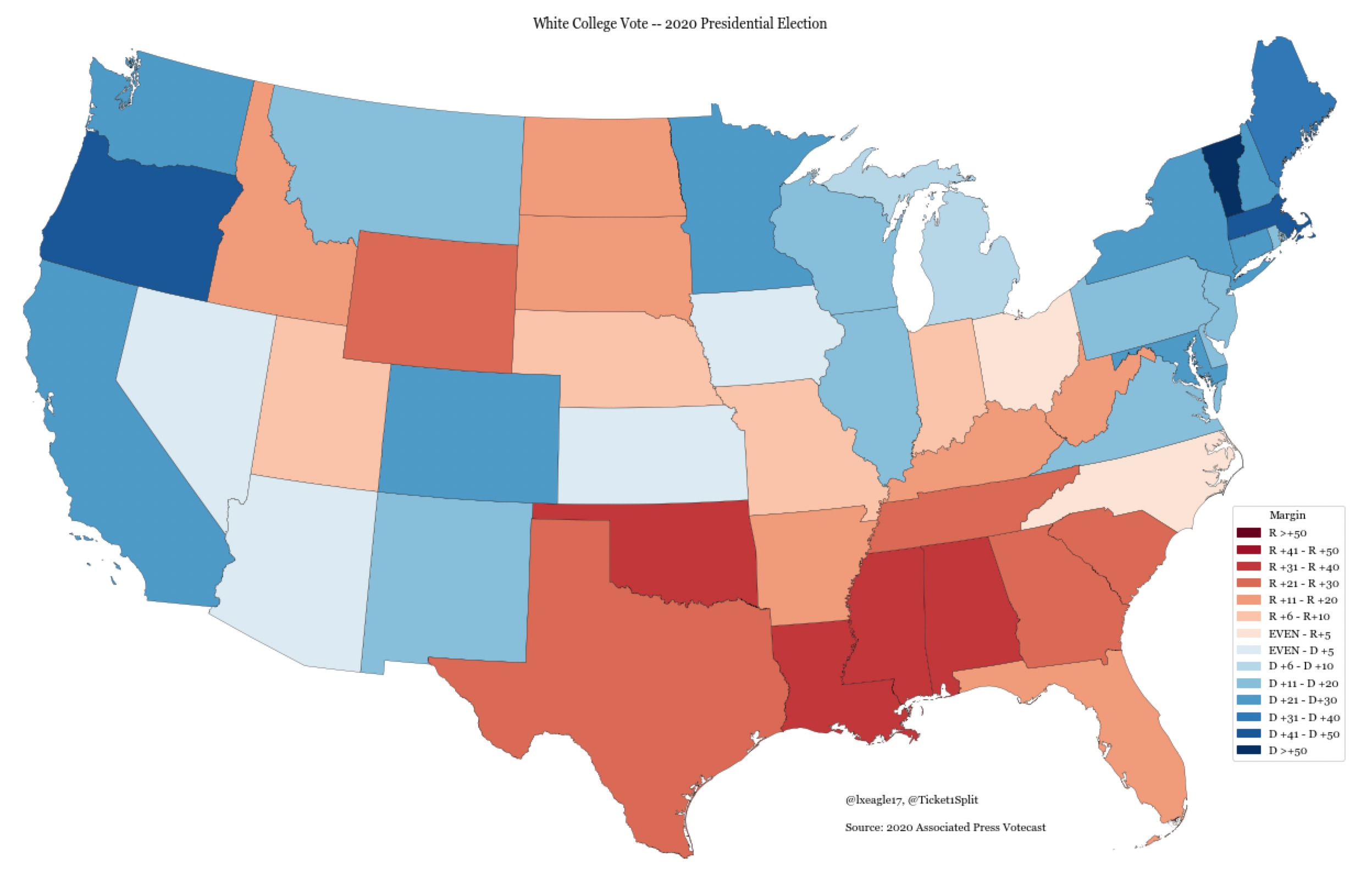
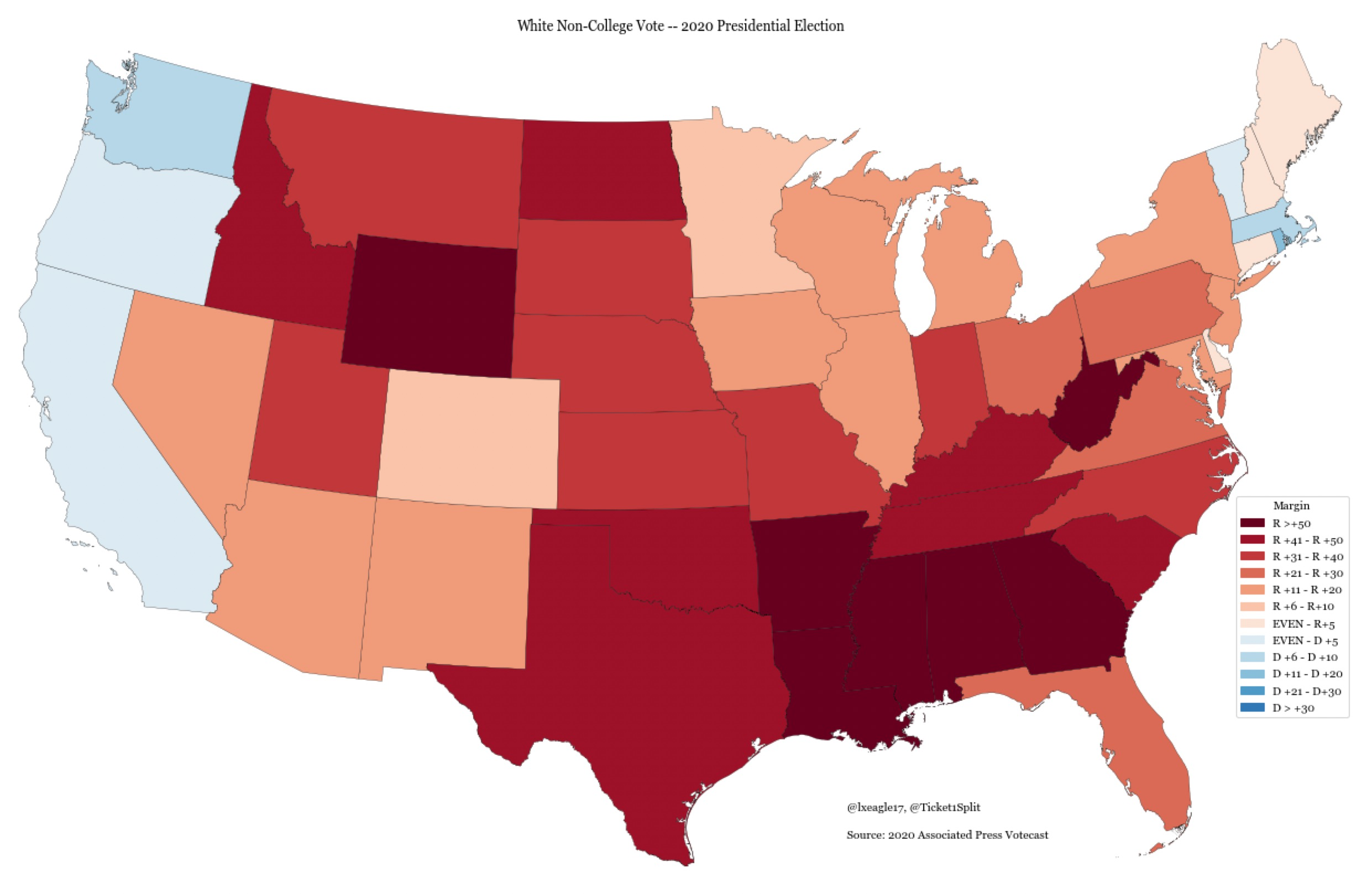
Top and bottom: College White vote and Non-college White vote in the 2020 presidential election by state.

According to conservative academic Sean Speer, some of the most important developments within the 21st-century American conservative movement include the rise of Donald Trump and right-wing populism more broadly, an emerging movement within conservatism that is opposed to both post-Cold War neoliberalism and liberalism more broadly, a generational change within conservatism causing a renewed emphasis on identity and culture among younger conservative figures, and the rise of social media platforms causing a fragmentation of traditional media platforms. According to historian Gary Gerstle, Trumpism gained support in opposition to neoliberalism, including opposition to free trade, illegal immigration, and internationalism.

Speer adds that these developments have caused "an erosion of the conservative consensus involving free markets, social conservatism, and a hawkish foreign policy (sometimes described as "fusionism") that provided the intellectual scaffolding for American conservatism essentially from the launch of National Review magazine in the mid-1950s to the second term of George W. Bush's presidency." Nate Cohn of The New York Times stated that Donald Trump's re-election in 2024 helped cement a realignment of right-wing populism as the dominant faction of American conservatism.

According to political scientists Matt Grossmann and David A. Hopkins, the Republican Party's gains among white voters without college degrees contributed to the rise of right-wing populism. It has also contributed to conservative anti-intellectualism, including distrust of the news media, educational institutions, and science. In the 2024 United States presidential election, Trump won 56% of voters without a college degree, compared to 42% of voters with a college degree.

Long-term shifts in American conservative thinking following the election of Trump have been described as a "new fusionism" of traditional conservative ideology and right-wing populist themes. These have resulted in shifts towards greater support of national conservatism, protectionism, cultural conservatism, a more realist foreign policy, a conspiracist subculture, a repudiation of neoconservatism, reduced efforts to roll back entitlement programs, and a disdain for traditional checks and balances.

=== The environment ===
Many modern conservatives globally in general and in the U.S. in particular oppose or partially oppose environmentalism. Conservative beliefs often include global warming denial or arguing that global warming is exaggerated, and opposition towards government action to combat it. They contend that, even if human activity is contributing to climate change, environmental regulation would do more harm than good. An example of this is the center-right to right-wing stance of adaptation over mitigation. Among conservatives who do support government intervention to prevent climate change, they generally prefer market-based policies such as a carbon tax over blanket bans and regulation.

In the past, conservatives have supported conservation efforts, from the protection of the Yosemite Valley to the creation of the Environmental Protection Agency. Republican Party leaders such as Newt Gingrich and Michele Bachmann advocate the abolition of the EPA, calling it "the job-killing organization of America."

Conservative think tanks since the 1990s have denied the concept of man-made global warming, challenged scientific evidence, publicized what they perceived as beneficial aspects of global warming, and asserted that proposed remedies would do more harm than good. The concept of anthropogenic global warming continues to be an ongoing debate among conservatives in the United States, but most conservatives reject the scientific consensus that climate change is caused by humans. A 2019 poll showed that fewer than 25% of Republicans believed humans were involved in causing global warming.

American conservatives have generally supported deregulation of pollution and reduced restrictions on carbon emissions. Similarly, they have advocated increased oil drilling with less regulatory interference, including oil drilling in the Arctic National Wildlife Refuge. In the 2008 election, the phrase "Drill, baby, drill" was used to express the Republican position on the subject.

President Donald Trump rolled back over 100 Obama-administration rules regarding the environment. President Trump also announced that the U.S. would stop making payments to the United Nations program "Green Climate Fund".

=== Law and order ===
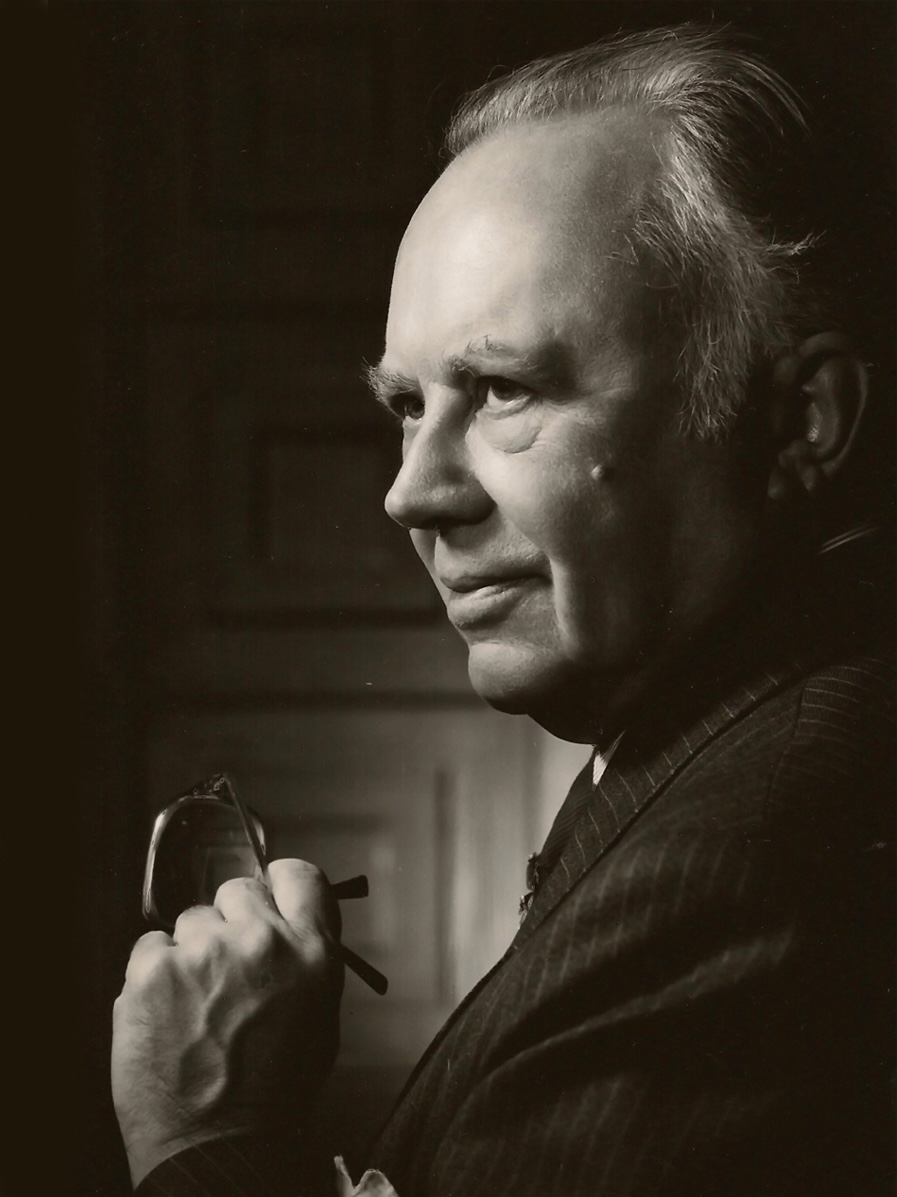
Russell Kirk, conservative theorist and author of The Conservative Mind, published in 1953

Conservatives generally support a strong policy of law and order to control crime, including long jail terms for repeat offenders. Most support the death penalty. Conservatives often oppose criminal justice reform, including efforts to combat racial profiling, police brutality, mass incarceration, and the war on drugs. They deny that racism exists in the criminal justice system, often opposing organizations such as Black Lives Matter, which they view as anti-police groups. To conservatives, police officers are reacting to violent situations in a rational way and have been the victims of unfair discrimination. The "law and order" issue was a major factor weakening liberalism in the 1960s.

Conservatives tend to support strict immigration policies. Most commonly, conservatives back policies that combat the rate of illegal entry at the southern border, and the increased deportation of illegal immigrants. They are also generally opposed to any policy that may provide "amnesty" to illegal immigrants.

=== Economics ===
American conservative discourse generally opposes a social market economy due to opposing the welfare state. In this view, government programs that seek to provide services and opportunities for the poor encourage laziness and dependence while reducing self-reliance and personal responsibility. Conservatives typically hold that the government should play a smaller role in regulating business and managing the economy. They typically support economic liberalization and oppose welfare programs to redistribute income to assist the poor. Such efforts, they argue, do not properly reward people who have earned their money through hard work. However, conservatives usually place a strong emphasis on the role of private voluntary charitable organizations (especially faith-based charities) in helping the poor.

Fiscal conservatives support privatization, believing that the private sector is more effective than the public sector. Many support school vouchers for private schools due to a belief that the performance of the public school system and teachers' unions is declining. They also favor private health care while opposing a universal health care system, claiming it constitutes socialized medicine. They often advocate for cuts to Social Security, Medicare, and Medicaid.

Modern conservatives derive support for free markets from practical grounds. They argue that free markets are the most productive markets. But many modern American fiscal conservatives accept some social spending programs not specifically delineated in the Constitution. Some American fiscal conservatives view wider social liberalism as an impetus for increased spending on these programs. As such, fiscal conservatism today exists somewhere between classical liberalism and contemporary consequentialist political philosophies.

Some conservatives oppose free trade policies and support protectionism and immigration reduction instead. They want government intervention to support the economy by protecting American jobs and businesses from foreign competition. They oppose free trade on the ground that it benefits other countries with lower wages or unfair trade practices (i.e. state-owned enterprises or state-provided subsidies) at the expense of American workers. They tend to support other free market principles like low taxes, limited government and balanced budgets.

=== Social issues ===
On social issues, many religious conservatives oppose changes in traditional moral standards regarding family, sexuality, and gender roles. They often oppose abortion, feminism, pornography, comprehensive sex education, homosexuality, same-sex marriage, transgender rights, secularism, atheism, and recreational drug use. The libertarian and fiscal conservative factions tend to instead focus on budgetary, monetary, and economic policies.

=== Race and culture ===
Modern conservatives usually oppose programs such as affirmative action and reparations for slavery, believing that America is not a racist country. They therefore argue that legislation should be colorblind, with no consideration for race. Conservatives often embrace individualism, rejecting the collectivism which is associated with identity politics. In addition, many right-wing nationalists oppose liberals' attempts to portray America's history, society, or government as racist, considering it unpatriotic or misleading. This point of view is controversial because racial tensions have intensified since the 2010s, with points of contention including the 1619 Project, the removal of Confederate monuments and memorials, reparations for slavery, and the defund the police movement.

Most conservatives oppose affirmative action based on race. Conservatives argue that affirmative action is not meritocratic, believing that job positions and college admissions should be earned through individual achievement rather than group identity. They oppose it as "reverse discrimination" that hinders reconciliation and worsens racial tensions.

In the culture war of recent decades, multiculturalism has been a flashpoint, especially in relation to the humanities curriculum. Historian Peter N. Stearns argues that since the 1960s, there has been a polarization between advocates of opposing political views because conservatives believe that the humanities express eternal truths such as the “self evident truths” of the Declaration of Independence should be taught but liberals believe that the humanities curriculum should be tailored to demonstrate diversity. Generally, conservatism opposes the "identity politics" associated with multiculturalism and supports individualism.

Cultural conservatives often support monoculturalism and the preservation of traditional American culture. They usually oppose multiculturalism and unchecked or illegal immigration. They favor a melting pot model of assimilation into the common English-speaking American culture, as opposed to a salad bowl approach that lends legitimacy to many different cultures. In the 21st century, conservatives have warned of the dangers of tolerating radical Islamic elements of the sort that are engaging in large-scale terrorism in Europe.

=== Response to liberalism ===
Ross Douthat, a conservative commentator, argues that as liberalism becomes more dominant, conservatism should work to conserve basic values against liberal assault. In 2021, he wrote:

Conservatism-under-liberalism should defend human goods that are threatened by liberal ideas taken to extremes. The family, when liberal freedom becomes a corrosive hyper-individualism. Traditional religion, when liberal toleration becomes a militant and superstitious secularism. Local community and local knowledge, against expert certainty and bureaucratic centralization. Artistic and intellectual greatness, when democratic taste turns philistine or liberal intellectuals become apparatchiks. The individual talent of the entrepreneur or businessman, against the leveling impulses of egalitarianism and the stultifying power of monopoly.

== Electoral politics ==
According to a 2025 Gallup poll, 37% of American voters identify as "conservative" or "very conservative," 34% as "moderate," and 25% as "liberal" or "very liberal." These percentages were fairly constant from 1990 to 2009, when conservatism spiked in popularity briefly, before reverting to the original trend, while liberal views on social issues reached a new high. For Republicans, 77% self-identified as conservative, 18% as moderate, and 4% as liberal. For Democrats, 9% identified as conservative, 34% as moderate, and 55% as liberal.

In the 21st century, conservatism appears to be growing stronger at the state level. In 2011, Richard Florida, a contributing writer to The Atlantic wrote that the trend is most pronounced among the "least well-off, least educated, most blue-collar, most economically hard-hit states."

In the United States, the Republican Party has been the party of conservatism since the middle of 1963, when the conservatives largely took control. When President Kennedy announced his intention to advance the Civil Rights Act, he alienated the then-Democrat white conservatives in the South who strongly opposed the civil rights movement. Between 1960 and 2000, the White South moved from 3-1 Democratic to 3-1 Republican.

In addition, some American libertarians, in the Libertarian Party and even some in the Republican Party, see themselves as conservative, even though they advocate significant economic and social changes—for instance, further dismantling the welfare system or liberalizing drug policy. They see these as conservative policies because they conform to the spirit of individual liberty that they consider to be a traditional American value. However, many libertarian think tanks, such as the Cato Institute, and libertarian intellectuals, such as David Boaz describe libertarianism as being "socially liberal and fiscally conservative."

=== Geography ===
Percent of self-identified conservatives by state as of 2018, according to a Gallup poll: 45% and above 40–44% 35–39% 30–34% 25–29% 24% and under

Alaska, the South, the Great Plains, and parts of the Mountain states and Midwest are generally conservative strongholds; in Mississippi, for instance, half of respondents identified themselves as conservatives, as opposed to moderates and liberals. The Northeast, parts of the Great Lakes region and Southwest, and the West Coast are the main liberal strongholds, with the fraction of Massachusetts self-identified conservatives being as low as 21%.

In the 21st century, rural areas of the United States that are predominantly non-college educated, Christian, and White are generally conservative bastions. Voters in the urban cores of large metropolitan areas tend to be more liberal and Democratic. There is a clear urban–rural political divide within and among states.

== Other topics ==
=== Russell Kirk's principles of conservatism ===
Russell Kirk developed six "canons" of conservatism, which Gerald J. Russello described as follows:

1. A belief in a transcendent order, which Kirk described variously as based in tradition, divine revelation, or natural law.
2. An affection for the "variety and mystery" of human existence.
3. A conviction that society requires orders and classes that emphasize natural distinctions.
4. A belief that property and freedom are closely linked.
5. A faith in custom, convention, and prescription.
6. A recognition that innovation must be tied to existing traditions and customs, which entails a respect for the political value of prudence.

Kirk said that "all culture arises out of religion." When religious faith decays, culture must decline, though it often seems to flourish for a space after the religion that has nourished it has sunk into disbelief."

In later works, Kirk expanded this list into his "Ten Principles of Conservatism" which are as follows:

1. First, the conservative believes that there exists an enduring moral order.
2. Second, the conservative adheres to custom, convention, and continuity.
3. Third, conservatives believe in what may be called the principle of prescription.
4. Fourth, conservatives are guided by their principle of prudence.
5. Fifth, conservatives pay attention to the principle of variety.
6. Sixth, conservatives are chastened by their principle of imperfectability.
7. Seventh, conservatives are persuaded that freedom and property are closely linked.
8. Eighth, conservatives uphold voluntary community, quite as they oppose involuntary collectivism.
9. Ninth, the conservative perceives the need for prudent restraints upon power and upon human passions.
10. Tenth, the thinking conservative understands that permanence and change must be recognized and reconciled in a vigorous society.

=== Courts ===
One stream of conservatism, exemplified by William Howard Taft, extols independent judges as experts in fairness and the final arbiters of the Constitution. In 1910, Theodore Roosevelt broke with most of his lawyer friends and called for popular votes that could overturn unwelcome decisions by state courts. Taft denounced his old friend and rallied conservatives to defeat him for the 1912 GOP nomination. Taft and the conservative Republicans controlled the Supreme Court until the late 1930s.

President Franklin D. Roosevelt, a liberal Democrat, did not attack the Supreme Court directly in 1937 but ignited a firestorm of protest with a proposal to add seven new justices. Conservative Democrats immediately broke with President Roosevelt, defeated his proposal, and built up the conservative coalition. While the liberals did take over the Court through replacements, they lost control of Congress. That is, the Court no longer overthrew liberal laws passed by Congress, but there were very few such laws that passed in 1937–60.

Conservatives' views of the courts are based on their beliefs: maintaining the present state of affairs, conventional and rule-oriented, and disapproval of government power. A recent variant of conservatism condemns "judicial activism"; that is, judges using their decisions to control policy, along the lines of the Warren Court in the 1960s. It came under conservative attack for decisions regarding redistricting, desegregation, and the rights of those accused of crimes. This position goes back to Jefferson's vehement attacks on federal judges and to Abraham Lincoln's attacks on the Dred Scott decision of 1857.

==== Originalism ====
A more recent variant that emerged in the 1980s is originalism, the assertion that the United States Constitution should be interpreted to the maximum extent possible in the light of what it meant when it was adopted. Originalism should not be confused with a similar conservative ideology, strict constructionism, which deals with the interpretation of the Constitution as written, but not necessarily within the context of the time when it was adopted. For example, the term "originalism" has been used by current Supreme Court justices Samuel Alito and Clarence Thomas, as well as former federal judges Robert Bork and Antonin Scalia, to explain their beliefs.

==== Federalism ====
Former Supreme Court Justice Sandra Day O'Connor, writing for the majority in Gregory v. Ashcroft 501 U.S. 452 (1991), said there are significant advantages to federalism and the recognition of state rights:

The federalist structure of joint sovereigns preserves to the people numerous advantages. It assures a decentralized government that will be more sensitive to the diverse needs of a heterogeneous society; it increases opportunity for citizen involvement in democratic processes; it allows for more innovation and experimentation in government; and it makes government more responsive by putting the States in competition for a mobile citizenry.

From the left, law professor Herman Schwartz argues that Rehnquist's reliance on federalism and states' rights has been a "fig leaf for conservatives":

Today's conservative Supreme Court majority, led by Chief Justice William H. Rehnquist, has imposed limitations on federal power to curtail the rights of women, religious groups, the elderly, racial minorities, and other disadvantaged groups. ... The conservatives have shrunk the scope of the commerce clause, developed implied limitations on federal authority, and narrowly construed the Civil War amendments.

=== Semantics, language, and media ===
==== Socialism ====
Conservatives have used the word Socialist as a "rhetorical weapon" against political opponents. David Hinshaw writes that William Allen White, editor of a small-town newspaper in Kansas from 1895, used "socialistic" as "his big gun to blast radical opposition". White set "Americanism" as the alternative, warning, "The election will sustain Americanism, or it will plant Socialism." White became famous when Mark Hanna, campaign manager for Republican candidate William McKinley distributed upwards of a million or more copies of one White editorial to rally opposition to William Jennings Bryan, the nominee of both the Democratic and Populist parties.

By the 1950s, the conservative press had discovered that socialism "proved to be a successful derogatory epithet rather than a descriptive label for a meaningful political alternative". At the 1952 Republican National Convention, former President Herbert Hoover repeated his warnings about two decades of New Deal policies, denouncing, says Gary Best, "the usurpation of power by the federal government, the loss of freedom in America, the poisoning of the American economy with fascism, socialism, and Keynesianism, and the enormous growth of the federal bureaucracy." In 1960, Barry Goldwater called for Republican unity against John F. Kennedy and the "blueprint for socialism presented by the Democrats." In 1964, Goldwater attacked central planners like fellow Republican Nelson Rockefeller, implying he was a socialist in a millionaire's garb: "The Democratic party believes in what I call socialism, and if that upsets anybody's stomach, let me remind you that central planning of our economy is socialism." Ronald Reagan often quoted Norman Thomas, the perennial Socialist nominee for president in the New Deal era, as allegedly saying, "The American people would never knowingly vote for Socialism, but that under the name of liberalism, they would adopt every fragment of the socialist program." In 2010, Newt Gingrich defined "socialism in the broad sense" as "a government-dominated, bureaucratically controlled, politician-dictated way of life." Gingrich stated that President Barack Obama was "committed to socialism."

=== Modern media ===
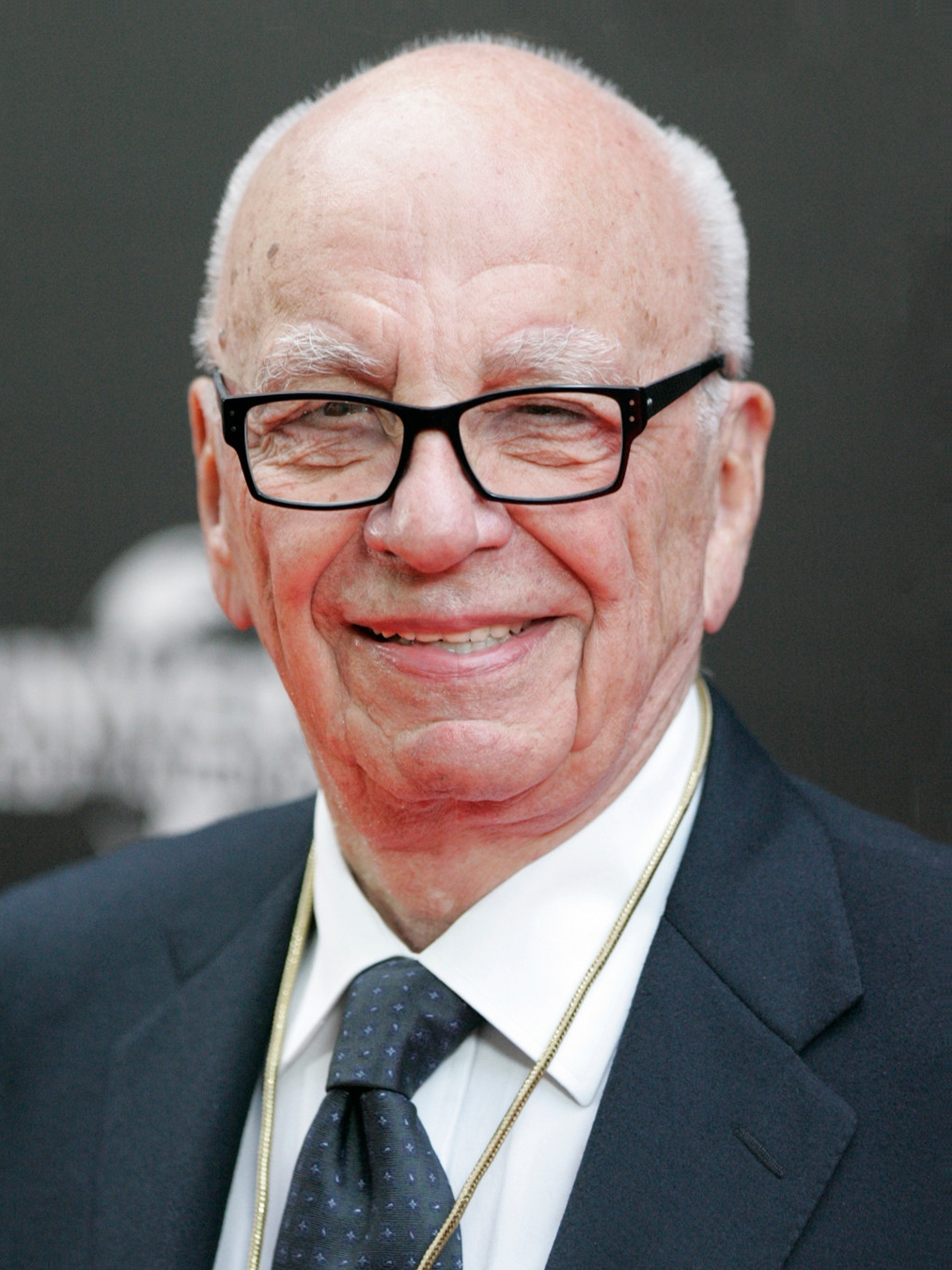
Keith Rupert Murdoch in 2012, founder of Fox Corporation

In the late 1980s, the resurgence of talk radio provided conservatives with a significant new medium for communication. William G. Mayer reports that "conservatives dominate talk radio to an overwhelming, remarkable degree." This dominance enabled them to spread their message much more effectively to the general public, which had previously been confined to the major Big Three television networks. Political scientists Jeffrey M. Berry and Sarah Sobieraj conclude that "conservatives like talk radio because they believe it tells them the truth. Liberals appear to be much more satisfied with the mainstream media and are more likely to believe that it is accurate."

Rush Limbaugh proved there was a huge nationwide audience for specific and heated discussions of current events from a conservative viewpoint. Other major hosts who describe themselves as conservative include: Michael Peroutka, Jim Quinn, Dennis Miller, Ben Ferguson, William Bennett, Andrew Wilkow, Lars Larson, Sean Hannity, G. Gordon Liddy, Laura Ingraham, Mike Church, Glenn Beck, Mark Levin, Michael Savage, Kim Peterson, Ben Shapiro, Michael Reagan, Jason Lewis, Ken Hamblin, and Herman Cain. The Salem Radio Network syndicates a group of religiously oriented Republican activists, including Roman Catholic Hugh Hewitt and Jewish conservatives Dennis Prager and Michael Medved. One popular Jewish conservative, Laura Schlessinger, offers parental and personal advice but is outspoken on social and political issues. In 2011, the largest weekly audiences for talk radio were 15 million for Limbaugh and 14 million for Hannity, with about nine million each for Glenn Beck, Michael Savage and Mark Levin. The audiences overlap, depending on how many each listener dials into every week.

Fox News features conservative hosts. One such host is Sean Hannity, who also has a talk radio program. One former host is Matt Drudge; prior, and after his time on Fox News Drudge has operated Drudge Report, a news aggregation website, and is a self-professed conservative. It is more conservative than other news sources in the United States, such as National Public Radio and CNN. Canadian-American political commentator David Frum has been a critic of this development and has argued that the influence of conservative talk radio and Fox News has harmed American conservatism, turning it from "a political philosophy into a market segment" for extremism and conflict, making "for bad politics but great TV."

=== Science and academia ===
==== Attitudes towards science ====
Whereas liberals and conservatives held similar attitudes towards science up until the 1990s, conservatives in the United States subsequently began to display lower levels of confidence in scientific consensus. Conservatives are substantially more likely than moderates and liberals to reject the scientific consensus on climate change. Conservatives are also more likely than liberals to hold anti-vaccine views.

==== Attitudes towards academia ====
According to a 2023 Gallup poll, confidence in higher education among Republicans declined sharply from 56% in 2015 to 19% in 2023. Among Democrats, confidence in higher education decreased from 68% in 2015 to 59% in 2023.

The Republican Party has steadily increased the percentage of votes it receives from white voters without college degrees since the 1970s, even as the educational attainment of the United States has steadily increased. Since the 2010s, a similar trend in the opposite direction has been seen among white voters with college degrees, who have been increasingly voting for the Democratic Party.

Liberal and leftist viewpoints have dominated higher education faculties since the 1970s, according to many studies, whereas conservatives are better represented in policy-oriented think tanks. Data from a survey conducted in 2004 indicated that 72% of full-time faculty identify as liberal, while 9–18% self-identify as conservative. Conservative self-identification is higher in two-year colleges than other categories of higher education but has been declining overall. Those in natural sciences, engineering, and business were less liberal than those in the social sciences and humanities. A 2005 study found that liberal views had increased compared to the older studies. 15% in the survey described themselves as center-right. While the humanities and the social sciences are still the most left-leaning, 67% of those in other fields combined described themselves as center-left on the spectrum. In business and engineering, liberals outnumber conservatives by a 2:1 ratio. The study also found that more women, practicing Christians, and Republicans taught at lower-ranked schools than would be expected from objectively measured professional accomplishments.

A study by psychologists at Tilburg University, published in September 2012 in the journal Perspectives on Psychological Science, found that, in social and personal psychology, about a third of those surveyed say that they would to a small extent favor a liberal point of view over a conservative point of view. A 2007 poll found that 58% of Americans thought that college professors' political bias was a "serious problem." This varied depending on the political views of those asked. 91% of "very conservative" adults agreed compared with only 3% of liberals. That same year, a documentary called Indoctrinate U was released, which focuses on the perceived bias within academia.

On the other hand, liberal critic Paul Krugman wrote in The New York Times that this phenomenon is more due to personal choice than some kind of discrimination or conspiracy, noting that, for example, vocations such as military officers are much more likely to be filled by conservatives rather than liberals. Additionally, two studies published in the journal of the American Political Science Association have suggested that the political orientations of college students' professors have little influence or "indoctrination" in terms of students' political belief.

==== Relativism versus absolutism ====
Postmodernism is an approach common in the humanities at universities that greatly troubles conservative intellectuals. The point of contention is the debate over moral relativism versus moral absolutism. Ellen Grigsby says, "Postmodern perspectives contend that any ideology putting forward absolute statements as timeless truths should be viewed with profound skepticism." Kellner says, "Postmodern discourse frequently argues that all discourses and values are socially constructed and laden with interests and biases. Against postmodern and liberal relativism, cultural conservatives have argued for values of universal truth and absolute standards of right and wrong."

Neoconservative historian Gertrude Himmelfarb has energetically rejected postmodern academic approaches:

[Postmodernism in history] is a denial of the objectivity of the historian, of the factuality or reality of the past, and thus of the possibility of arriving at any truths about the past. For all disciplines it induces a radical skepticism, relativism, and subjectivism that denies not this or that truth about any subject but the very idea of truth—that denies even the ideal of truth, truth is something to aspire to even if it can never be fully attained.

Jay Stevenson wrote the following representative summary of postmodern literary studies of the sort that antagonize conservatives:

[In the postmodern period,] traditional literature has been found to have been written by "dead white males" to serve the ideological aims of a conservative and repressive Anglo hegemony. ... In an array of reactions against the race, gender, and class biases found to be woven into the tradition of Anglo lit, multicultural writers and political literary theorists have sought to expose, resist, and redress injustices and prejudices. These prejudices are often covert—disguised in literature and other discourses as positive ideals and objective truths—but they slant our sense of reality in favor of power and privilege.

Conservative intellectuals have championed a "high conservative modernism" that insists that universal truths exist and have opposed approaches that deny the existence of universal truths. Many argued that natural law was the repository of timeless truths. Allan Bloom, in his highly influential The Closing of the American Mind (1987) argues that moral degradation results from ignorance of the great classics that shaped Western culture. His book was widely cited by conservative intellectuals for its argument that the classics contained universal truths and timeless values, which were being ignored by cultural relativists.

In Postwar American Fiction and the Rise of Modern Conservatism: A Literary History, 1945 - 2008 (Cambridge University Press, 2021), Bryan M. Santin argues that conservative literary tastes have shifted over time. He argues that this

shift registered and mediated the deeper foundational antinomy structuring postwar conservatism itself: the stable social order of traditionalism and the creative destruction of free-market capitalism. Postwar conservatives produced, in effect, an ambivalent double register in the discourse of conservative literary taste that sought to celebrate neo-aristocratic manifestations of cultural capital while condemning newer, more progressive manifestations revolving around racial and ethnic diversity.

== Historiography ==
In recent years, historians have agreed that they need to rethink the role of conservatism in recent American history. An important new approach rejects the older consensus that liberalism was the dominant ethos. Labor historians Jefferson Cowie and Nick Salvatore argue the New Deal was a short-term response to the depression and did not mark a permanent commitment to a welfare state, claiming that America has always been too individualistic and too hostile to labor unions to ever embrace liberalism for any extended period of time. This new interpretation argues that conservatism has largely dominated American politics since the 1920s, with the brief exceptions of the New Deal era (1933–1938) and the Great Society (1964–1966). However, historian Julian Zelizer argues that "the coherence of conservatism has been exaggerated. The movement was as fragile as the New Deal coalition that it replaced. ... Policy change has thus proved to be much more difficult than conservatives hoped for." Zelizer does find four areas where conservatives did make major changes, namely retrenchment of domestic programs, lowering taxes, deregulation, and opposition to labor unions. He concludes, "The fact is that liberalism survived the rise of conservatism."

=== American exceptionalism ===
American conservatives typically promote American exceptionalism, the idea that the United States is inherently exceptional and has a duty to lead in spreading democracy and free markets to the world. Reagan was an advocate of American exceptionalism, and many liberals also agree with it. Proponents of American exceptionalism believe that the American values that emerged from the American Revolution created what Harvard University political scientist and sociologist Seymour Martin Lipset, in 1963, called "the first new nation" and developing a uniquely American ideology, "Americanism", based on liberty, egalitarianism, individualism, republicanism, democracy, laissez-faire capitalism and Judeo-Christian values. American exceptionalism does not mean that the United States is superior to other nations, though some conservatives have used the phrase in that context.

==== City upon a Hill ====
American conservatives also have argued that the U.S. is a "City upon a Hill", a phrase Jesus used in the Sermon on the Mount and which is attributed to Jesus in the Gospel of Matthew. Beginning in 1630, the phrase "city upon a hill" was used frequently by Puritan settlers in the Province of Massachusetts Bay during the colonial era, who believed America was exempted from the historical forces that have impacted other nations. In January 1989, in his farewell address to the nation, Ronald Reagan also cited the phrase, saying, "the past few days when I've been at that window upstairs, I've thought a bit of the 'shining city upon a hill.' The phrase comes from John Winthrop, who wrote it to describe the America he imagined. What he imagined was important because he was an early Pilgrim, an early freedom man. He journeyed here on what today we'd call a little wooden boat; and like the other Pilgrims, he was looking for a home that would be free

== Notable individuals ==
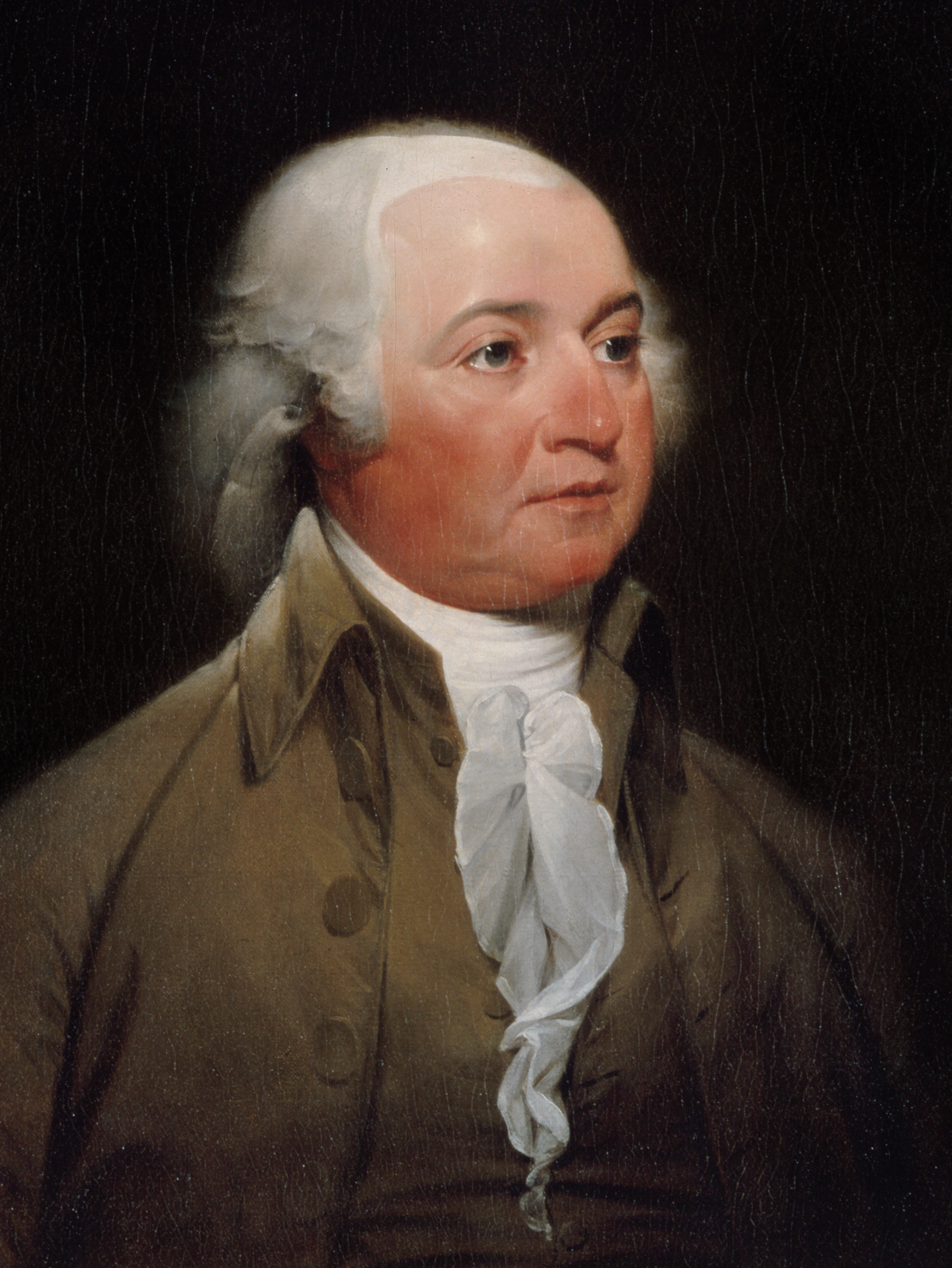
John Trumbull's 1792 portrait of John Adams, a key architect of the American Revolution, a delegate to the revolutionary Second Continental Congress in Philadelphia, and the second president of the United States

== See also ==
Conservatism in the US
- Asian American and Pacific Islands American conservatism in the United States
- Bibliography of conservatism in the United States
- Black conservatism in the United States
- Christian right
- Compassionate conservatism
- Conservative coalition in Congress, 1938–1960s
- Culture of the Southern United States
- Democratic backsliding in the United States
- Fusionism
- Hispanic and Latino conservatism in the United States
- LGBTQ conservatism in the United States
- Liberalism in the United States
- Libertarianism in the United States (Libertarian Republican)
- Media bias in the United States
- Neoconservatism
- Old Right (United States)
- Paleoconservatism
- Politics of the Southern United States
- Progressivism in the United States
- Radicalism in the United States
  - Radical right (United States)
- Republican Party (United States)
- Timeline of modern American conservatism
- Two-party system in the United States
- Women in conservatism in the United States
- Rumble (video platform is popular among American conservatives)
- Jewish conservatism

Conservatism abroad

- Conservatism in Australia
- Conservatism in France
- Conservatism in Germany
- Conservatism in Russia
- Conservatism in the United Kingdom
