= Sean Speer =

Canadian academic and political commentator

- Born: Thunder Bay, Ontario, Canada
- Education: Lakehead University (B.A); Carleton University (M.A.)
- Known for: Public Policy; columnist
- Political party: Conservative Party

Sean Speer is a Canadian academic, commentator, and public policy analyst. He is senior fellow at the University of Toronto's Munk School of Global Affairs and Public Policy, Fellow in strategic competitiveness at the Public Policy Forum, Editor-at-large at The Hub, and a regular contributor to the National Post. He has been published in The Globe and Mail, Maclean's, C2CJournal, National Review, and Institute for Research on Public Policy's Policy Options.

== Career ==
=== Political career ===
In 2007, Speer was convinced to put off finishing his PhD studies in economics to join President of the Treasury Board Vic Toews' office as a policy adviser. In 2009, he joined the Prime Minister's Office as a policy adviser, responsible for the Finance portfolio. By 2010, he began also serving as a manager in stakeholder relations while maintaining a role as policy adviser. The Hill Times reported that he was "rumoured to have disliked the stakeholder relations position", and in 2012, he was named the PMO's senior economic policy adviser, responsible for the Finance and the Treasury Board portfolio.

In 2012, Speer became Finance Minister Jim Flaherty's Director of Policy. Before the July 2013 cabinet shuffle, he announced his resignation and joined the Fraser Institute as director of the Centre for Fiscal Studies. In November 2014, he rejoined the PMO as a special adviser, while also working with senior Conservatives on the party's 2015 election platform. In 2015, he was named in the Top 25 Most Powerful & Influential People in Government and Politics by The Hill Times as a PMO advisor to Prime Minister Stephen Harper.

=== Think Tank Career ===
Following the election, he joined the Macdonald-Laurier Institute as a Senior Fellow, authoring a series of articles and policy recommendations for the Trudeau government entitled "From A Mandate For Change To A Plan To Govern" with Managing Director Brian Lee Crowley. In March 2018, Speer launched Ontario 360, a think tank at the University of Toronto's School of Public Policy and Governance, with Peter Loewen, an associate professor at the university. In April 2019, he joined the Public Policy Forum as a Fellow in Residence, and in August he was announced as the 2019 Prime Ministers of Canada Fellow to study urban and rural differences.

Brian Lee Crowley, a Canadian author, and public policy commentator, called him "one of the brightest intellectual lights of his generation." Former Prime Minister Stephen Harper said he was "an impressive thinker in [...] the areas of modern conservatism, economics, history, and public policy." In 2021, he was ranked 38th on Maclean's power list, earning the nickname as "the thinking man's Conservative."

=== Commentary career ===
On April 21, 2021, Speer launched The Hub, a news and commentary website focused Canadian policy and governance, with Rudyard Griffiths, Luke Graeme Smith, Stuart Thomson, and Ken Whyte. Its stated goal is to "reorient popular debate in Canada to the big ideas that will propel us collectively towards a different and better future." The site is a project of the Centre For Civic Engagement, who also organizes the Munk Debates, which co-founder Griffiths chairs.
