= Bibliography of conservatism in the United States =

This is a selective bibliography of conservatism in the United States covering the key political, intellectual and organizational themes that are dealt with in Conservatism in the United States. Google Scholar produces a listing of 93,000 scholarly books and articles on "American Conservatism" published since 2000. The titles below are found in the recommended further reading sections of the books and articles cited under "Surveys" and "Historiography." The "Historiography" and "Critical views" section mostly comprise items critical or hostile of American conservatism.

Kim Phillips-Fein in 2018 argued, "an entire field of scholarship has emerged to interrogate the roots, development, and persistence of modern American conservatism." Robert Mason in 2015 noted:

Over the past 20 years, the emergence of modern American conservatism – no longer an orphan – has attracted a vibrant and sophisticated historiography....Among the key concerns of historians has been to explain conservatism's transition from the political and intellectual margins in the 1950s and 1960s...to apparent dominance by the end of the 1970s, confirmed by Ronald Reagan's 1980 victory.

== Surveys ==
- Allitt, Patrick. The Conservatives: Ideas and Personalities Throughout American History (2010) ISBN 978-0300164183
- Continetti, Matthew. The Right: The Hundred-Year War for American Conservatism (2022) excerpt
- Critchlow, Donald T. The Conservative Ascendancy: How the Republican Right Rose to Power in Modern America (2nd ed. 2011) excerpt
- Critchlow, Donald T. and Nancy MacLean. Debating the American Conservative Movement: 1945 to the Present (2009)
- Farber, David. The Rise and Fall of Modern American Conservatism: A Short History (2012).
- Filler, Louis. Dictionary of American Conservatism (Philosophical Library, 1987) online
- Frohnen, Bruce et al. eds. American Conservatism: An Encyclopedia (2006) ISBN 1932236449
- Hahn, Steven. Illiberal America A History (W.W. Norton, 2024) blurb
- Nash, George H. The Conservative Intellectual Movement in America Since 1945 (2006). ISBN 978-1933859125 online, a standard intellectual history
- Postell, Joseph W. and Johnathan O'Neill, eds. Toward an American Conservatism: Constitutional Conservatism during the Progressive Era (2013)
- Postell, Joseph W. and Johnathan O'Neill, eds. American Conservatism: 1900-1930 (Lexington Press, 2020)

=== Historiography ===
- Brinkley, Alan. "The Problem of American Conservatism," American Historical Review 99 (April 1994): 409–29.
- Burns, Jennifer. "In Retrospect: George Nash's the Conservative Intellectual Movement in America since 1945," Reviews in American History, Sep 2004, Vol. 32 Issue 3, pp. 447–62 in Project MUSE
- Cowie, Jefferson, and Nick Salvatore, "The Long Exception: Rethinking the Place of the New Deal in American History," International Labor & Working-Class History, (2008) 74:3–32; argue the New Deal was a response to depression and did not mark a commitment to a welfare state because America has always been too individualistic
- Dochuk, Darren. "Revival on the Right: Making Sense of the Conservative Moment in Post-World War II American History," History Compass (Sept 2006) 4#4 pp. 975–99, doi:10.1111/j.1478-0542.2006.00341.x
- Kazin, Michael. "The Grass-Roots Right: New Histories of U.S. Conservatism in the Twentieth Century," American Historical Review (February 1992) 97:136–55
- Lewis, Hyman. "Historians and the Myth of American Conservatism" Journal of The Historical Society (2012), 12#1 pp. 27–45. doi:10.1111/j.1540-5923.2011.00354.x
- McGirr, Lisa. "Now That Historians Know So Much about the Right, How Should We Best Approach the Study of Conservatism?" Journal of American History (2011) 98(3): 765–70 doi:10.1093/jahist/jar478
- Moore, Leonard Joseph. "Good Old-Fashioned New Social History and the Twentieth-Century American Right," Reviews in American History (1996) 24#4 pp. 555–73 in Project MUSE
- Phillips-Fein, Kim. "Conservatism: A State of the Field," Journal of American History (Dec 2011) 98#3 pp. 723–43, with commentary by Wilfred M. McClay, Alan Brinkley, Donald T. Critchlow, Martin Durham, Matthew D. Lassiter, and Lisa McGirr, and response by Phillips-Fein, pp. 744–73 online
- Ponce de Leon, Charles L. "The New Historiography of the 1980s," Reviews in American History, (2008) 36#2 pp. 303–31, in Project MUSE
- Ribuffo, Leo P. "Why is There so Much Conservatism in the United States and Why Do So Few Historians Know Anything about It". American Historical Review Vol. 99, No. 2 (Apr. 1994), pp. 438–49 in JSTOR
- Ribuffo, Leo P. "The Discovery and Rediscovery of American Conservatism Broadly Conceived," OAH Magazine of History (2003) 17#2 pp. 5–10. doi:10.1093/maghis/17.2.5
- Ribuffo, Leo. "Conservatism and American Politics". Journal of the Historical Society, March 2003, Vol. 3 Issue 2, pp. 163–75
- Shermer, Elizabeth Tandy. "Whither the Right?: Old and New Directions in the History of American Conservatism." Reviews in American History 44.4 (2016): 644–52.
- Zelizer, Julian E. "Reflections: Rethinking the History of American Conservatism," Reviews in American History, 38#2 (June 2010), pp. 367–92 doi:10.1353/rah.0.0217

== Intellectual history ==
- de Forest, Jennifer. "Conservatism Goes to College: The Role of Philanthropic Foundations in the Rise of Conservative Student Networks," History of Higher Education Annual, 26 (2007), 103–27.
- Dunn, Charles W. and J. David Woodard; The Conservative Tradition in America Rowman & Littlefield, 1996
- Foner, Eric. "Radical Individualism in America: Revolution to Civil War," Literature of Liberty, vol. 1 no. 3, 1978 pp. 1–31 online
- Genovese, Eugene. The Southern Tradition: The Achievement and Limitations of an American Conservatism (1994)
- Gottfried, Paul. The Conservative Movement Twayne, 1993.
- Guttman, Allan. The Conservative Tradition in America Oxford University Press, 1967.
- Kendall, Willmoore, and George W. Carey. "Towards a Definition of 'Conservatism." Journal of Politics 26 (May 1964): 406–22. in JSTOR
- Kirk, Russell. The Conservative Mind. Regnery Publishing; 7th edition (2001): ISBN 0895261715
- Lee, Michael J. Creating Conservatism: Postwar Words that Made an American Movement (2014)
- Langdale, John. Superfluous Southerners: Cultural Conservatism and the South, 1920–1990 (2012)
- Lora, Ronald. Conservative Minds in America Greenwood, 1976.
- Lora, Ronald. The Conservative Press in Twentieth-Century America Greenwood Press, 1999 online edition
- Lora, Ronald; Longton, William Henry (1999). Lora, Ronald; Longton, William Henry (eds.). The Conservative Press in Eighteenth-and Nineteenth-Century America. Archived from the original on 2019-03-25 – via Questia.
- Lowi, Theodore J. The End of the Republican Era (1995) online review
- Lyons, Paul. American Conservatism: Thinking It, Teaching It. (Vanderbilt University Press, 2009). 202 pp. ISBN 978-0826516268
- Mergel, Sarah Katherine. Conservative Intellectuals and Richard Nixon: Rethinking the Rise of the Right (Palgrave Macmillan, 2010); 248 pages; traces Nixon's relations with conservative intellectuals from 1968 to 1974, including those who saw him as a closet liberal.
- Meyer, Frank S. ed. What Is Conservatism? (1964).
- Murphy, Paul V. The Rebuke of History: The Southern Agrarians and American Conservative Thought (2001)
- Nau, Henry R. Conservative Internationalism: Armed Diplomacy under Jefferson, Polk, Truman, and Reagan (2013)
- Nisbet, Robert A. Conservatism: Dream and Reality. University of Minnesota Press, 1986.
- Rossiter, Clinton. Conservatism in America. 2nd ed. Harvard University Press, 1982.
- Thorne, Melvin J. (1990). American Conservative Thought since World War II: The Core Ideas – via Questia.
- Viereck, Peter. Conservatism: from John Adams to Churchill (2nd ed. 1978)

== Political activity ==
- Aberbach, Joel D., and Gillian Peele, eds. Crisis of Conservatism?: The Republican Party, the Conservative Movement, and American Politics After Bush (2011) excerpt and text search
- Critchlow, Donald T. When Hollywood Was Right: How Movie Stars, Studio Moguls, and Big Business Remade American Politics (Cambridge University Press, 2013)
- Cunningham, Sean P. American Politics in the Postwar Sunbelt: Conservative Growth in a Battleground Region (Cambridge UP, 2014)
- Cunningham, Sean P. Cowboy Conservatism: Texas and the Rise of the Modern Right (2010)
- Diamond, Sara. Roads to Dominion: Right-Wing Movements and Political Power in the United States (Guilford Press, 1995)
- Hart, Jeffrey. The Making of the American Conservative Mind: The National Review and Its Times (2005)
- Hahn, Steven. Illiberal America A History (W.W. Norton, 2024) blurb
- Hayward, Steven F. The Age of Reagan: The Fall of the Old Liberal Order: 1964–1980 (2009) excerpt and text search
- Hayward, Steven F. The Age of Reagan: The Conservative Counterrevolution 1980–1989 (2009) excerpt and text search
- Heath, Karen Patricia. "New Directions in the History of Conservative Women." Journal of Women's History 29#2 (2017): 165–72.
- Horwitz, Robert B. America's right: anti-establishment conservatism from Goldwater to the Tea Party (2013).
- Kabaservice, Geoffrey. Rule and Ruin: The Downfall of Moderation and the Destruction of the Republican Party, From Eisenhower to the Tea Party (2012) scholarly history excerpt and text search
- Lauck, Jon K. and Catherine McNicol Stock, eds. The Conservative Heartland: A Political History of the Postwar American Midwest (UP of Kansas, 2020) online review
- McDonald, Forrest. States' Rights and the Union: Imperium in Imperio, 1776–1876 (2002)
- Malsberger, John W. From Obstruction to Moderation: The Transformation of Senate Conservatism, 1938–1952 (2000).
- Nickerson, Michelle M. Mothers of Conservatism: Women and the Postwar Right (Princeton University Press, 2012), 248 pp.
- Pafford, John M. The Forgotten Conservative: Rediscovering Grover Cleveland (Simon and Schuster, 2013) excerpt
- Patterson, James. Congressional Conservatism and the New Deal: The Growth of the Conservative Coalition in Congress, 1933–39 (1967)
- Perlstein, Rick. Before the Storm: Barry Goldwater and the Unmaking of the American Consensus (2004) on 1964
- Perlstein, Rick (2008). Nixonland: The Rise of a President and the Fracturing of America. Simon and Schuster. ISBN 978-0743243025.
- Phillips-Fein, Kim. Invisible Hands: The Businessmen's Crusade Against the New Deal (2009) excerpt; same book also published as Invisible hands: the making of the conservative movement from the New Deal to Reagan
- Reinhard, David W. (1983). Republican Right since 1945. University Press of Kentucky. Archived from the original on April 16, 2016 – via Questia.
- Ribuffo, Leo P. The Old Christian Right: The Protestant Far Right from the Great Depression to the Cold War (1983) online edition
- Scanlon, Sandra, "The Conservative Lobby and Nixon's 'Peace with Honor' in Vietnam," Journal of American Studies 43 (Aug. 2009), 255–76.
- Schweikart, Larry, and Michael Allen. A Patriot's History of the United States: From Columbus's Great Discovery to the War on Terror (2004), 930 pp. the most thorough textbook from an explicitly conservative viewpoint excerpt and text search
- Shelley II, Mack C. The Permanent Majority: The Conservative Coalition in the United States Congress (1983)
- Tucker, Garland S., III. The high tide of American conservatism: Davis, Coolidge, and the 1924 election (2010) online
- Wilensky, Norman N. Conservatives in the Progressive Era: The Taft Republicans of 1912 (1965).

== Biographical ==
- Bogus, Carl T. Buckley: William F. Buckley Jr. and the Rise of American Conservatism (2011) ISBN 978-1596915800
- Chambers, Whittaker, Witness (1952), a memoir his Communist years; primary source
- Critchlow, Donald T. Phyllis Schlafly and Grassroots Conservatism: A Woman's Crusade (2005)
- Crunden, Robert M. The Mind and Art of Albert Jay Nock (1964)
- Dierenfield, Bruce J. Keeper of the Rules: Congressman Howard W. Smith of Virginia (1987), leader of the Conservative coalition in Congress
- Federici, Michael P. Eric Voegelin: The Restoration of Order (2002)
- Fite, Gilbert. Richard B. Russell, Jr, Senator from Georgia (2002) leader of the Conservative coalition in Congress
- Goldberg, Robert Alan. Barry Goldwater (1995)
- Judis, John B. William F. Buckley, Jr.: Patron Saint of the Conservatives (1988) excerpt and text search
- Kelly, Daniel. James Burnham and the Struggle for the World: A Life (2002)
- Link, William A. (2008). Righteous Warrior: Jesse Helms and the Rise of Modern Conservatism. St. Martin's Press. ISBN 978-0312356002.
- Lurie, Jonathan, William Howard Taft: The Travails of a Progressive Conservative (2011) excerpt and text search
- Patterson, James T. Mr. Republican: A Biography of Robert A. Taft (1972)
- Pemberton, William E. Exit with Honor: The Life and Presidency of Ronald Reagan (1998)
- Rodgers, Marion Elizabeth. Mencken: The American Iconoclast (2005)
- Smant, Kevin J. Principles and Heresies: Frank S. Meyer and the Shaping of the American Conservative Movement (2002) (ISBN 1882926722)
- Smith, Richard Norton. An Uncommon Man: The Triumph of Herbert Hoover (1994) particularly 1933–64
- Tanenhaus, Sam. Whittaker Chambers: A Biography (1997) (ISBN 978-0375751455)

== Recent politics ==
- Agarwal, Sheetal D., et al. "Grassroots organizing in the digital age: Considering values and technology in Tea Party and Occupy Wall Street." Information, Communication & Society 17.3 (2014): 326–41.
- Bader, John B. (1996). Taking the Initiative: Leadership Agendas in Congress and the "Contract with America". Archived from the original on April 15, 2016 – via Questia.
- Berkowitz, Peter. Varieties Of Conservatism In America (2004)
- Collins, Robert M. Transforming America: Politics and Culture During the Reagan Years, (2007).
- Ehrman, John. The Eighties: America in the Age of Reagan (2008)
- Gutsche, Jr., Robert E. ed. The Trump Presidency, Journalism, and Democracy (Routledge Research in Journalism, 2018).
- Hayward, Steven F. The Age of Reagan, 1964–1980: The Fall of the Old Liberal Order (2001); The Age of Reagan: The Conservative Counterrevolution: 1980–1989 (2009) excerpt and text search
- Himmelstein, Jerome and J. A. McRae Jr. "Social Conservatism, New Republicans and the 1980 Election", Public Opinion Quarterly, 48#3 (1984), 595–605. online
- Micklethwait, John, and Adrian Wooldridge. The Right Nation (2004) excerpt and text search, overview by British journalists
- Rae, Nicol C. Conservative Reformers: The Republican Freshmen and the Lessons of the 104th Congress (1998) online edition
- Schoenwald, Jonathan. A Time for Choosing: The Rise of Modern American Conservatism (2002) excerpt and text search
- Skocpol, Theda, and Vanessa Williamson. The Tea Party and the remaking of Republican conservatism (Oxford UP, 2016)
- Valentine, Phil. The Conservative's Handbook: Defining the Right Position on Issues from A to Z (2008). ISBN 978-1492622352, OCLC 1001855278
- Van Dyke, Nella, and David S. Meyer. Understanding the Tea Party Movement (The Mobilization Series on Social Movements, Protest, and Culture) (2014)

=== Libertarian ===
- Bessner, Daniel. "Murray Rothbard, political strategy, and the making of modern libertarianism." Intellectual History Review 24#4 (2014): 441–56. doi:10.1080/17496977.2014.970371
- Burns, Jennifer. Goddess of the Market: Ayn Rand and the American right (Oxford University Press, 2009) ISBN 978-0195324877
- Carey, George (2008). "Conservatism". In Hamowy, Ronald (ed.). The Encyclopedia of Libertarianism. Thousand Oaks, CA: SAGE; Cato Institute. pp. 93–95. doi:10.4135/9781412965811.n61. ISBN 978-1412965804. OCLC 750831024.
- Keckler, Charles, and Mark J. Rozell. "The Libertarian Right and the Religious Right." Perspectives on Political Science 44#.2 (2015): 92–99. doi:10.1080/10457097.2015.1011476
- Sager, Ryan. The Elephant in the Room: Evangelicals, Libertarians, and the Battle to Control the Republican Party (Wiley, 2006) ISBN 978-0471793328
- Waldenmaier, Jacob Louis. "Mystique of the Intellectual: Heroes of Ayn Rand's Dystopias and Ron Paul's Revolution." Jefferson Journal of Science and Culture 3 (2013). available online

=== Neoconservatism ===
- Bloom, Allan. The Closing of the American Mind (Simon & Schuster 1988) ISBN 0671657151
- Fukuyama, Francis. America at the Crossroads: Democracy, Power, and the Neoconservative Legacy (2007)
- Gerson, Mark. The Neoconservative Vision: From the Cold War to Culture Wars (1997)
- Halper, Stefan & Clarke, Jonathan, America Alone: The Neo-Conservatives and the Global Order (Cambridge University Press, 2004) ISBN 0521838347

=== Critical views ===
- Bell, David. ed, The Radical Right. Doubleday 1963.
- Coser Lewis A., and Irving Howe, eds. The New Conservatives: A Critique from the Left New American Library, 1976.
- Diamond, Sara. Roads to Dominion: Right-Wing Movements and Political Power in the United States. (1995)
- Huntington, Samuel P. "Conservatism as an Ideology." American Political Science Review 52 (June 1957): 454–73.
- Koopman; Douglas L. Hostile Takeover: The House Republican Party, 1980–1995 Rowman & Littlefield, 1996
- Lapham, Lewis H. "Tentacles of Rage" in Harper's, September 2004, pp. 31–41.
- Martin, William. 1996. With God on Our Side: The Rise of the Religious Right in America, New York: Broadway Books.
- Schulman, Bruce J. and Julian E. Zelizer, eds. Rightward Bound: Making America Conservative in the 1970s (2008)

== Social science approaches ==
- Aberbach, Joel D. "Understanding American Political Conservatism." in Robert A. Scott and Stephen M. Kosslyn, eds. Emerging Trends in the Social and Behavioral Sciences: An Interdisciplinary, Searchable, and Linkable Resource (2015). doi:10.1002/9781118900772.etrds0373
- Alexander, Gerard. "The Fog of Political War: Predicting the Future Course of Conservatism." Journal of Policy History (2014) 26#1 pp. 121–37. online analysis of projected demographic trends
- Gross, Neil, Thomas Medvetz, and Rupert Russell. "The Contemporary American Conservative Movement." Annual Review of Sociology (2011) 37 pp. 325–54 online doi:10.1146/annurev-soc-081309-150050
- Perrin, Andrew J., J. Micah Roos, and Gordon W. Gauchat. "From Coalition to Constraint: Modes of Thought in Contemporary American Conservatism." Sociological Forum (2014) 29#2 pp. 285–300 doi:10.1111/socf.12084

== Sources ==
- Buckley, William F., Jr., ed. Up from Liberalism Stein and Day, (1958)
- Buckley, William F., Jr., ed. Did You Ever See a Dream Walking? American Conservative Thought in the 20th Century Bobbs-Merrill, (1970)
- Gerson, Mark, ed., The Essential Neo-Conservative Reader (Perseus Publishing, (1997)) ISBN 0201154889
- Kristol, Irving, Neoconservatism: The Autobiography of an Idea, ISBN 978-0028740218
- Schneider, Gregory L. ed. Conservatism in America Since 1930: A Reader (2003)
- Stelzer, Irwin ed. The NeoCon Reader (2005) ISBN 0802141935
- Wolfe, Gregory. Right Minds: A Sourcebook of American Conservative Thought. Regnery, (1987) ISBN 978-0895265838
