= Political issues in higher education in the United States =

Issues in higher education

Higher education in the United States is an optional stage of formal learning following secondary education. Higher education, also referred to as post-secondary education, third-stage, third-level, or tertiary education occurs most commonly at one of the 4,360 Title IV degree-granting institutions, either colleges or universities in the country. These may be public universities, private universities, liberal arts colleges, community colleges, or for-profit colleges. US higher education is loosely regulated by several third-party organizations.

Within this vast estate many issues arise for government, staff and students.

== Political views ==
Research since the 1970s has consistently found that professors are more liberal and Democratic than the general population.

A 2007 Zogby poll found that 58% of Americans thought that college professors' political bias was a "serious problem". This varied depending on the political views of those asked. 91% of "very conservative" adults agreed compared with 3% of liberals.

Self-reported political views of U.S. academic faculty (% by year), according to the HERI Faculty Survey reports 1990–2017

A nationwide study conducted every three years by the Higher Education Research Institute (HERI) of UCLA shows that from 1989 to 2014 professors identifying as liberal or far-left increasingly outnumbered those identifying as conservative or far-right. The shift from 2014 to 2017 was less extreme than prior years, with numbers standing at approximately 60% liberal/far-left, 28% moderate, and 12% conservative/far-right. According to an article published in Academe, the impact of having more liberal professors meant that fewer conservative students were likely to pursue advanced or doctoral degrees. According to Stephen Hayward, the fewer conservative professors results in fewer conservative students being mentored and supported to seek graduate level education, creating a "self-reinforcing" cycle.

In 2012, Tilburg University psychologists Yoel Inbar and Joris Lammers conducted anonymous random surveys of 800 members of the Society for Personality and Social Psychology and found that 85% of respondents self-identified as liberal and 6% self-identified as conservative. Respondents that self-identified as either conservative or moderate were found to be significantly more reluctant to express their political views to their colleagues for fear of negative consequences, and were more likely to believe that their colleagues would actively discriminate against them on the basis of their political beliefs.

In January 2015, a major literature review co-written by psychologists José L. Duarte, Jarret T. Crawford, Jonathan Haidt, Lee Jussim, Philip E. Tetlock and sociologist Charlotta Stern summarized numerous studies of how academic psychology has little ideological diversity, that the ratio of liberal-to-conservative or Democratic-to-Republican professors has dramatically increased since 1990, that the disparity is undermining the quality of research in psychology, and that the main causes of the lack of ideological diversity are self-selection, hostile climate, and discrimination.

In September 2016, a replication and extension of the 2012 Inbar and Lammers study conducted by psychologists Nathan Honeycutt and Laura Freberg surveyed 618 faculty members of four California State University campuses and confirmed the previous finding of a hostile climate towards conservative professors in academic psychology departments, but also extended their study to 76 other academic departments spanning agricultural, business, education, arts and letters, engineering, and science colleges and found that there are sizable percentages of professors willing to discriminate against conservative academics in every academic department that they surveyed.

== Student conservative groups, free speech, and hate speech ==
Turning Point USA is a conservative youth group formed by Charlie Kirk in 2012. The organization has a presence on hundreds of US campuses. In 2016, Turning Point USA began publishing its Professor Watchlist to expose faculty who they claim "discriminate against conservative students, promote anti-American values and advance leftist propaganda in the classroom." Charlie Kirk, TPUSA's president, has criticized college campuses as "islands of totalitarianism" filled with liberal students and faculty members who force their worldview upon those around them.

In December 2018, the University of California, Berkeley settled a free speech lawsuit filed by the Berkeley College Republicans and Young America's Foundation, accusing the university of discriminating against speakers with conservative views. Under the settlement, Berkeley will modify its procedures for handling "major events", which typically draw hundreds of people, and agreed not to charge "security" fees for a variety of activities, including lectures and speeches. It will also pay $70,000 to cover the legal costs of the plaintiffs.

The Anti-Defamation League verified more than 300 incidents of white nationalist propaganda at more than 200 college and university campuses in 2018.

On March 21, 2019, President Donald Trump issued an executive order to protect campus free speech. According to President Trump, "under the guise of speech codes, safe spaces and trigger warnings, these universities have tried to restrict free thought, impose total conformity and shut down the voices of great young Americans..." He added that "taxpayer dollars should not subsidize anti–First Amendment institutions...."

== Political lobbying ==
Politics and lobbying play a significant part in the history of U.S. for-profit school growth. The for-profit education industry has spent more than $40 million on lobbying from 2007 to 2012. and $36 million since 2010. For-profit education lobbying grew from $83,000 in 1990 to approximately $4.5 million in its peak year of 2012. In 2019, colleges and universities spent almost $75 million in federal lobbies. The most significant industry lobby is Career Education Colleges and Universities (CECU), previously known as The Association of Private Sector Colleges and Universities (ASPCU). Before 2010, the organization was known as the Career College Association. The Cato Institute's Center for Educational Freedom also supports for-profit higher education.
