= Brian Lee Crowley =

Canadian economist

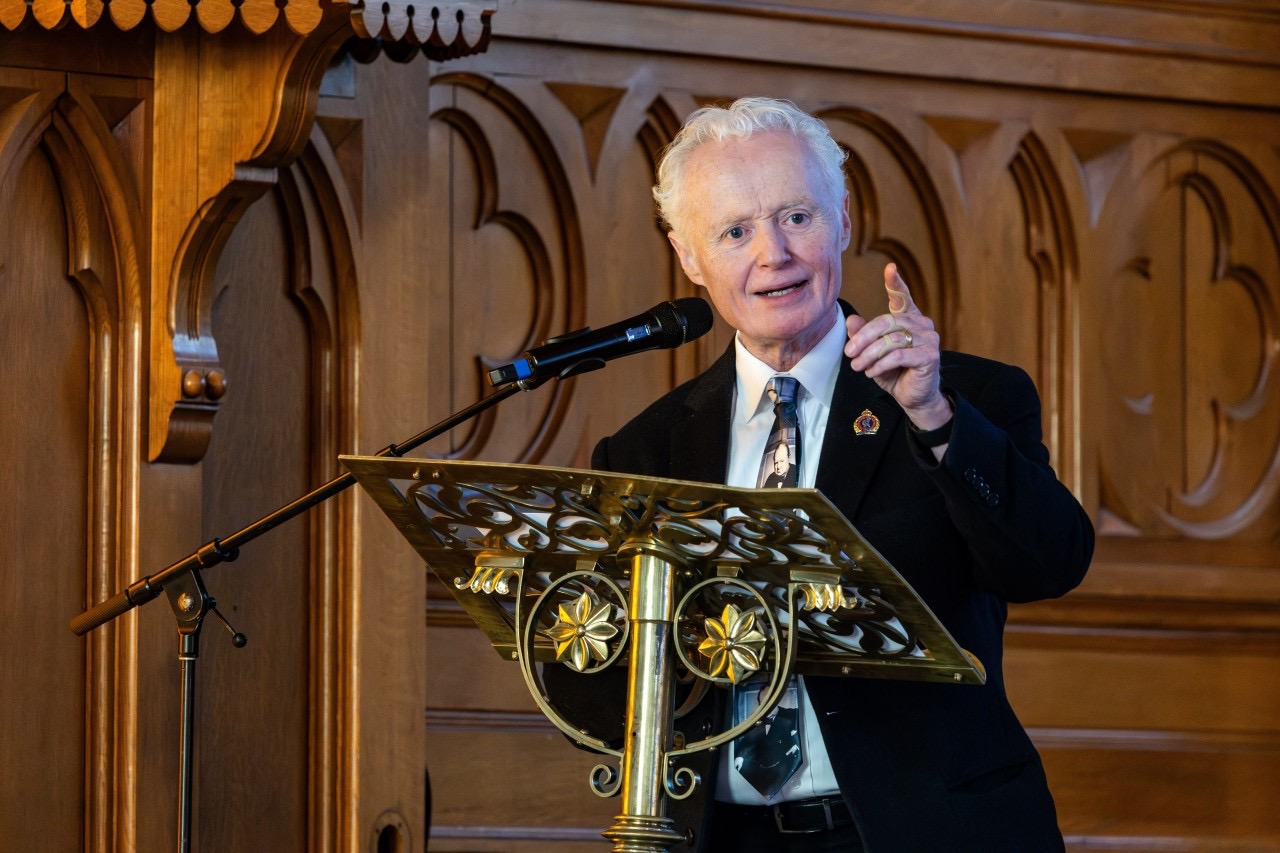
- Born: August 20, 1955 (age 71); Vancouver, British Columbia, Canada
- Education: McGill University; London School of Economics (PhD)
- Website: http://brianleecrowley.com

Brian Lee Crowley (born 1955) is a Canadian author, public policy commentator, columnist, policy advisor and public speaker. He is the founder (2010) and managing director of the Macdonald-Laurier Institute (Ottawa, Canada) and its US subsidiary, founded in 2024 in Washington DC, the Center for North American Prosperity and Security (CNAPS). He also founded Atlantic Institute for Market Studies (AIMS) in Halifax, NS in 1994 and headed it until he left to start MLI in 2010.

== Education ==
Crowley graduated from McGill University before going on to graduate studies at the London School of Economics, where he earned a doctorate in political economy. His doctoral dissertation examined the social, economic, and political philosophy of F. A. Hayek and was subsequently published by Oxford University Press.

== Career ==
In 1994, Crowley founded the Atlantic Institute for Market Studies (AIMS), a public policy research institute based in Atlantic Canada, and served as its president for nearly two decades. Between 1997 and 1999, he took a leave of absence from the institute to serve on the editorial board of ‘‘The Globe and Mail’’. He has served as president of the Atlantic Provinces Economic Council (APEC). He has taught politics, economics, and philosophy at universities in Canada, the United States, the United Kingdom, and Europe. He has also served as a constitutional adviser to the governments of Nova Scotia during the Charlottetown Accord negotiations and Manitoba during the Meech Lake Accord negotiations. He was a member of Alberta Premier Ralph Klein’s Premier’s Advisory Council on Health.

Earlier in his career, Crowley was a Parliamentary Intern at the House of Commons, worked as a diplomat with the Commission of the European Economic Community (now the European Union), served as a United Nations aid administrator in Zaire (now the Democratic Republic of the Congo), and advised the Government of Quebec on parliamentary and electoral reform. He was also a Salvatori Fellow at the Heritage Foundation in Washington, D.C. From 2006 to 2008, he served as the Clifford Clark Visiting Economist at Canada’s Department of Finance, where he worked on a range of economic policy issues and redesigned the federal pre-budget consultation process.

== Macdonald-Laurier Institute ==
In March 2010, Crowley founded the Macdonald-Laurier Institute (MLI), a public policy think tank based in Ottawa, Ontario. The institute convenes recognized experts to contribute to discussions on current public policy issues including national defence, national security, foreign affairs, Canada–United States relations, Indigenous affairs, economic policy, immigration, the judiciary, and the rule of law. In 2013, the University of Pennsylvania’s ‘‘Global Go To Think Tank Index’’ ranked the Macdonald-Laurier Institute among the leading new think tanks internationally.

The institute has received the Templeton Freedom Award for Outstanding Performance by a Young Think Tank and has twice been shortlisted for Templeton awards for individual policy projects. It also received a ‘‘Prospect magazine’’ award for its‘‘Justice System Report Card’’ and an honourable mention for work relating to economic development in Indigenous communities. The institute and several of its senior fellows have also been included on sanctions or blacklist measures announced by the governments of Russia and China in connection with their work on foreign policy and foreign interference.

In 2024, the Macdonald-Laurier Institute established the Center for North American Prosperity and Security (CNAPS) in Washington, D.C., to examine Canada–United States relations and North American policy issues. Crowley hosts the institute’s ‘‘Voices that Inspire’’ speaker series, which features discussions with public figures including Douglas Murray, Niall Ferguson, Rob Henderson, Liz Truss and Tony Abbott.

== Honour and recognitions ==
The Canadian Century: Moving Out of America’s Shadow’’ received the Sir Antony Fisher International Memorial Award for think tank publications, the third time he has received this award.

Crowley has several times appeared on ‘’The Hill Times’’ annual list of 100 Most Influential People in Ottawa.

In 2019–2020, Crowley served as a Distinguished Lecturer at the Canadian Institute of Mining, Metallurgy and Petroleum (CIM).

In 2022 Crowley received the Medal of Honorary Recognition from the Latvian Minister of Defence.

In 2026, the Canadian Antisemitism Education Foundation announced that Crowley would receive its Advocate Award of Excellence in recognition of his work on the Macdonald-Laurier Institute’s ‘‘Promised Land’’ project, which examines antisemitism, Israel, the Middle East conflict, and political extremism.

== Publications ==
Crowley is the author of six books, including ‘‘Fearful Symmetry: The Fall and Rise of Canada’s Founding Values’’ (2009) and ‘‘Gardeners vs. Designers: Understanding the Great Fault Line in Canadian Politics’’ (2020). He also co-authored ‘‘The Canadian Century: Moving Out of America’s Shadow’’,thefirst book published by the Macdonald-Laurier Institute.

In addition to his books, Crowley has written opinion articles, newspaper columns, and policy papers on Canadian public policy. His work has appeared in Canadian and international publications, and he has been interviewed by media organizations including ‘‘The Wall Street Journal’’, ‘‘The Economist’’, ‘‘Die Zeit’’, Fox News, South China Morning Post, National Public Radio and RealClearPolitics.

== Selected work ==
●‘‘Fearful Symmetry: The Fall and Rise of Canada’s Founding Values’’ (2009)

●‘‘The Canadian Century: Moving Out of America’s Shadow’’ (co-author)

●‘‘Gardeners vs. Designers: Understanding the Great Fault Line in Canadian Politics’’ (2020)
