= Macdonald–Laurier Institute =

Canadian think tank

Macdonald-Laurier Institute
- Abbreviation: MLI
- Named after: John A. Macdonald and Wilfrid Laurier
- Formation: 2010
- Type: Public policy think tank
- Headquarters: 323 Chapel Street, Suite #300, Ottawa, Ontario, K1N 7Z2, Canada
- Key people: Brian Lee Crowley, Managing Director
- Website: macdonaldlaurier.ca

The Macdonald–Laurier Institute (MLI) is a conservative public policy think tank located in Ottawa, Ontario, Canada.

Founded in 2010, the institute is named after John A. Macdonald, a Tory and Canada's first Prime Minister, and Wilfrid Laurier, a Liberal and the country's first French-Canadian Prime Minister. MLI is a registered charity and is funded by corporate and individual donors and private foundations.

MLI's analysis has been described as market-oriented. It is affiliated with the Atlas Network, a conservative and libertarian group based in the United States. MLI describes itself as non-partisan, a description used for it by The Economist in 2010 and The Globe and Mail in 2024. In August 2022, Russia designated the MLI as an "undesirable organisation".

== Research areas and publishing ==
MLI is described by Global News as "an Ottawa-based think tank made up of academics, activists and former diplomats and politicians". MLI publishes the periodical Inside Policy, and produces books, reports, commentary, columns, and video. The institute's research areas encompass Canadian domestic and foreign policy, energy policy, and indigenous affairs, according to its website. Examples of current and past MLI research projects include Competition Policy in Canada; DisInfoWatch.org; Aboriginal Canada and the Natural Resource Economy; COVID Misery Index; The Great Energy Crisis; Indigenous Prosperity at a Crossroads; Internal Trade; Fiscal Reform; Fixing Canadian Health Care; Size of Government in Canada; Canada and the Indo-Pacific Initiative; and The Canadian Century Project: Why Balanced Budgets Matter.

MLI published its first book in May 2010. Titled The Canadian Century: Moving out of America's Shadow, the book appeared on the best-seller list of the Montreal Gazette and was named to the 2010 Hill Times list of Best Books in the public policy category.

In September 2026, MLI published an article on h-index disparities between Canada Research Chairs of different races, stating that Black and Indigenous researchers have lower h-indices than White Male researchers, and that the proportion of White Male researchers was in decline. They went on to claim:

EDI hiring resulted in lost productivity equivalent to 10 to 15 per cent per “equity-deserving” [sic] (female, Black, Indigenous) Canada Research Chair between 2016 to 2025.

=== Disinfowatch ===
In September 2020, MLI launched "DisinfoWatch", a project to monitor and track disinformation in Canada and debunk misinformation, with a specific focus on the COVID-19 pandemic. The project is funded by the Macdonald–Laurier Institute, Journalists for Human Rights, and the United States Department of State's Global Engagement Center, an organization created by former U.S. president Obama. Its listed research partners include the East StratCom Task Force, European Values Center for Security Policy, Henry Jackson Society, Montreal Institute for Genocide and Human Rights Studies, NATO Strategic Communications Centre of Excellence, and the Stockholm Free World Forum.

== Impact ==
The Macdonald–Laurier Institute has been ranked among the top three Canadian think tanks in the Global Go To Think Tanks Report produced by the University of Pennsylvania's Think Tanks and Civil Society Program. In 2012, the same organization ranked MLI as one of the top three of the Best New Think Tanks worldwide.

MLI contributors and staff have provided commentary for national and regional news media on a variety of national issues. The institute's Op-Eds have appeared in Canadian national newspapers such as The Globe and Mail and National Post, as well as in the Vancouver Sun, Calgary Herald, Windsor Star, Moncton Times & Transcript, Halifax Chronicle-Herald. The institute has also been highlighted in Foreign Policy magazine, The Wall Street Journal and The Economist. According to MLI, its articles and op-eds appear in the national and international media on average once a day.

According to a report in The Guardian, a multi-year MLI campaign defended oil and gas development rights on Indigenous land. For several years, it helped discourage Canada's government from implementing a United Nations declaration on Indigenous peoples' rights to reject pipelines or drilling, until Parliament eventually passed a law in 2021. The Guardian said the MLI campaign was in partnership with the Atlas Network, a libertarian-conservative group based in the United States, but MLI disputes the relationship. MLI said its experts support Indigenous energy rights but took issue with the proposed legislation.

== Political stance ==
The Economist described MLI in 2010 as non-partisan, as did The Globe and Mail in 2024. MLI was included in a 2012 Forbes article by former Atlas Network president Alejandro Chafuen describing the market-oriented think tank landscape in Canada. MLI was described in 2012 as one of a new generation of similarly minded think tanks to the Fraser Institute in a story published in the National Post. The social democratic Broadbent Institute referred to the MacDonald-Laurier Institute as a "right-wing charity" in a 2018 article. MLI is one of ten Canadian think tanks that belong to the Atlas Network, a conservative and libertarian group. MLI describes itself non-partisan.

In April 2023, MLI's website was blocked in Russia, along with that of other Western think tanks including Britain's Chatham House and the Woodrow Wilson Center in the U.S. Global News said MLI had been "a leading voice against the Russian war in Ukraine". In August 2022 MLI was added to the Russian Ministry of Justice's list of "foreign and international non-governmental organizations whose activities are recognized as undesirable in Russia." In July 2026, The Globe and Mail reported that Chinese military intelligence cloned MLI's website in an attempt to gain access to sensitive information.

== Organisation ==
The Macdonald–Laurier Institute's Managing Director is Brian Lee Crowley. He has served as the Clifford Clark Visiting Economist at the Department of Finance, and founded the Atlantic Institute for Market Studies. MLI has a Board of Directors, an Advisory Council, and a Research Advisory Board. MLI is a registered charity with the Canada Revenue Agency.
