= Patrick Allitt =

British historian and academic (born 1956)

Patrick N. Allitt
- Born: 26 August 1956 (age 70); Mickleover, Derbyshire, England

Patrick N. Allitt (born 1956) is a British historian and academic who serves as the Cahoon Family Professor of American History at Emory University. He has written seven books on religious history, education, politics and environmental history, and has produced several lectures for The Great Courses.

== Early life and education ==
Allitt was born in 1956 in Mickleover on the outskirts of Derby in Derbyshire. He studied at Hertford College, Oxford (1974–1977), then moved to America and gained a PhD in American history at University of California Berkeley (1986).

== Career ==
He held the Arthur Blank Chair for Teaching Excellence at Emory University and was, for five years, director of Emory's Center for Teaching and Curriculum. He is now the Cahoon Family Professor of American History at Emory University in Atlanta, Georgia.

His recent publications include contributions to The American Conservative, The Spectator (London), The National Interest, and Modern Intellectual History. He is also the principal lecturer in seven of "The Great Courses" made by The Teaching Company of Chantilly, Virginia. He has spoken in many parts of the United States and lead college-level teaching workshops. In the late 1980s, he wrote a short history of American biographies of Jesus Christ.

His scholarship has been widely reviewed in history journals. In 2004, Lawrence Moore, a Cornell University professor, said, "Any writer who has attempted to track a subject through a long stretch of time appreciates how difficult it is to balance the requirement of inclusiveness with a consistent elaboration of central themes. Patrick Allitt in his confident survey of American religion since World War II succeeds in this task far better than most and has produced a volume of immense value to university students, general readers, and scholars needing a reliable reference source."

== Bibliography ==
- Catholic Intellectuals and Conservative Politics in America: 1950 – 1985 (Cornell University Press, 1993)
- Catholic Converts: British and American Intellectuals Turn to Rome (Cornell University Press, 1997)
- Major Problems in American Religious History editor, (Houghton Mifflin, 2000)
- I'm the Teacher, You're the Student: A Semester in the University Classroom (University of Pennsylvania Press, 2004)
- Religion in America Since 1945: A History (Columbia University Press, 2005)
- The Conservatives: Ideas and Personalities in American History (Yale University Press, 2009).
- A Climate of Crisis. America in the Age of Environmentalism (New York: Penguin, 2014).

== Audio and Video Lecture Series ==
Allitt has done a number of highly reviewed lecture series for The Great Courses, including:

- "The Great Tours, England, Scotland and Wales-2018" (36 lectures)
- "The American West: History, Myth, and Legacy" (24 lectures)
- "History of the United States" (Second Edition) (last 36 in an 84 lecture course, in collaboration with Allen Guelzo and Gary Gallagher)
- "The Art of Teaching: Best Practices From a Master Educator" (24 lectures)
- "American Religious History" (24 lectures)
- "The Conservative Tradition" (36 lectures)
- "The Industrial Revolution" (36 lectures)
- "The Rise and Fall of the British Empire" (36 lectures)
- "Victorian Britain" (36 lectures)
- "American Identity" (48 lectures)
- ”America after the Cold War: The First 30 Years” (12 lectures)
- "How Railways Transformed the World" (24 lectures)
