= Frank J. Coppa =

American historian, author, and educator (1937–2021)

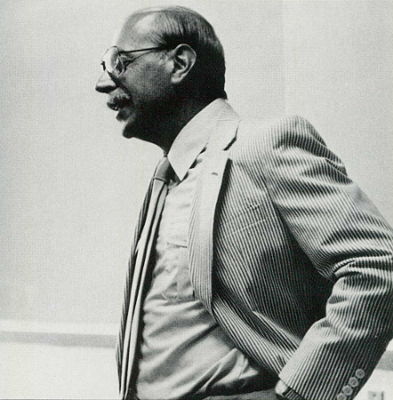
- Dr. Frank J. Coppa, 1986
- Born: Frank John Coppa; July 18, 1937; Brooklyn, New York, U.S.
- Died: January 13, 2021 (aged 83); Brooklyn, New York, U.S.

Academic background
- Education: Brooklyn College (B.A.), Catholic University of America (M.A., Ph.D.)

Academic work
- Discipline: History
- Institutions: St. John's University

Frank John Coppa (July 18, 1937 – January 13, 2021) was an American historian, author, and educator who wrote widely on the Papacy in history as well as on Italian historical topics.

== Life and recognition ==
Born on July 18, 1937, in Brooklyn, New York, Coppa attended Brooklyn College (B.A., 1960) and the Catholic University of America (M.A., 1962; Ph.D., 1966). His dissertation, "Giolitti and Industrial Italy: An Analysis of the Interrelationship Between Giolitti's Economic Policy and His Political Program" was supervised by John K. Zeender. He received a Fulbright grant to study in Italy in 1964–1965.

Coppa began teaching at St. John's University in Jamaica, Queens, New York, in 1965 as an Instructor, and was promoted to Assistant Professor (1966), Associate Professor (1970), and Professor (1979). He was the founding director of the school's doctoral program in Modern World History, and retired in 2010. He was honored with the title of professor emeritus in 2012. In 2011, he received the first Lifetime Distinguished Scholarship Award from the American Catholic Historical Association. St. John's announced his death in January 2021, as well as "The Frank J. Coppa Endowed Scholarship in History." His obituary appeared in the January 30, 2021 edition of The Tablet.

== Scholarship ==
Coppa's dissertation topic was, "Giolitti and Industrial Italy: An Analysis of the Interrelationship Between Giolitti's Economic Policy and His Political Program." Many of his early publications dealt with topics pertaining to both Catholic and Italian history, such as Giolitti, Mazzini, Antonelli, Cavour, Garibaldi, and Columbus. Several of his early edited collections contain contributions by St. John's colleagues, including William D. Griffin, Eugene Kusielewicz, and Richard P. Harmond. Later in his career, Coppa also began to publish widely on the Papacy, including articles and books on Pio Nono, Pius XI, and Pius XII. He also authored/edited several widely respected books on the Papacy, including Encyclopedia of the Vatican and the Papacy (1999), The Great Popes Through History: An Encyclopedia (2002), The Papacy, the Jews and the Holocaust: From Nineteenth-Century Anti-Semitism to the Third Millennium (2006), and Politics and the Papacy in the Modern World (2008). His book Religion in the Making of Western Man (1974) is dedicated to his senior history department colleagues, Walter L. Willigan, Arpad F. Kovacs, and Borisz de Balla, "for many years of distinguished and loyal service to St. John’s University, New York."

== Bibliography ==
Books authored by Coppa:

- Planning, Protectionism, and Politics in Liberal Italy: Economics and Politics in the Giolittian Age (Catholic University of America Press, 1971).
- Camillo di Cavour (Twayne Publishers, 1973).
- Pope Pius IX: Crusader in a Secular Age (Twayne Publishers, 1979).
- Cardinal Giacomo Antonelli and Papal Politics in European Affairs (State University of New York Press, 1990).
- The Origins of the Italian Wars of Independence (Longman, 1992).
- The Modern Papacy Since 1789 (Addison Wesley Longman, 1998).
- The Papacy Confronts the Modern World (Krieger Pub., 2003).
- The Papacy, the Jews and the Holocaust: From Nineteenth-Century Anti-Semitism to the Third Millennium (Catholic University of America Press, 2006).
- Politics and the Papacy in the Modern World (Praeger, 2008).
- The Policies and Politics of Pope Pius XII: Between Diplomacy and Morality (Peter Lang, 2011).
- The Life and Pontificate of Pope Pius XII: Between History and Controversy (Catholic University of America Press, 2013).
- The Papacy in the Modern World: A Political History (Reaktion Books, 2014).

Books edited/co-edited by Coppa:

- (co-editor) From Vienna to Vietnam: War and Peace in the Modern World (Wm. C. Brown Book Company, 1969).
- (co-editor) Cities in Transition: From the Ancient World to Urban America (Nelson Hall, 1974).
- (editor) Religion in the Making of Western Man (St. John's University Press, 1974).
- (co-editor) The Immigrant Experience in America (Twayne Publishers, 1976).
- (editor) Screen and Society: The Impact of Television Upon Aspects of Contemporary Civilization (Nelson Hall, 1979).
- (co-editor) Technology in the Twentieth Century (Kendall/Hunt Publishing Company, 1983).
- (editor) Dictionary of Modern Italian History (Greenwood Press, 1985).
- (editor) Studies in Modern Italian History: From the Risorgimento to the Republic (Peter Lang, 1986).
- (co-editor) Modern Italian History: An Annotated Bibliography (Greenwood Press, 1990).
- (co-editor) The Formation of the Italian Republic: Proceedings of the International Symposium on Postwar Italy (Peter Lang, 1993).
- (editor) Controversial Concordats: The Vatican's Relations With Napoleon, Mussolini, and Hitler (Catholic University of America Press, 1999).
- (editor) Encyclopedia of the Vatican and the Papacy (Greenwood Press, 1999).
- (editor) The Great Popes Through History: An Encyclopedia (2 vols., Greenwood Press, 2002).
- (editor) Encyclopedia of Modern Dictators: From Napoleon to the Present (Peter Lang, 2006).
