= Peter Viereck =

American poet

- Born: 5 August 1916; New York City, New York, U.S.
- Died: 13 May 2006 (aged 89); South Hadley, Massachusetts, U.S.
- Occupations: Poet and professor
- Parent: George Sylvester Viereck
- Awards: Pulitzer Prize for Poetry; Fulbright Scholar

Academic background
- Education: Harvard University (BA, MA, PhD)
- Influences: Babbitt; Stevenson

Academic work
- Discipline: History
- Main interests: Poetry, politics

Peter Robert Edwin Viereck (August 5, 1916 – May 13, 2006) was an American writer, poet, and professor of history at Mount Holyoke College. He won the Pulitzer Prize for Poetry in 1949 for Terror and Decorum, a collection of poetry. In 1955 he was a Fulbright Scholar at the University of Florence.

== Early life and education ==
Viereck was born in New York City, on August 5, 1916, son of George Sylvester Viereck. He received his B.A. summa cum laude in history from Harvard University in 1937. He then specialized in European history, receiving his M.A. in 1939 and his Ph.D. in 1942, both from Harvard.

== Career ==
Viereck was prolific in his writing from 1938, publishing collections of poems, some first published in Poetry Magazine. He won the annual Pulitzer Prize for Poetry in 1949 for the collection Terror and Decorum.

Viereck taught at Smith College in 1946 and 1947. In 1948, he joined the faculty at nearby Mount Holyoke College, where he taught history for nearly fifty years. He retired in 1987, but continued to teach his Russian history survey course there until 1997.

=== Politics ===
In the 1940s, Viereck was an early leader in the conservative movement but by 1951 felt that it had strayed from true conservatism. This is reflected in his review of William F. Buckley's God and Man at Yale, The New York Times, November 4, 1951). In April 1940, Viereck wrote an article in the Atlantic Monthly ("But—I'm a Conservative!"), partly in reaction against the ideologies of his father, George Sylvester Viereck, a Nazi sympathizer.

Peter Viereck's article ... argued for a "new conservatism" to counter the "storm of authoritarianism" in Europe and moral relativism in the USA. He claimed communism and Nazism were utopian and would sanction the murder of oppositions (as in anti-semitism) and that liberalism shared a naive belief in progress and humanity's essential goodness.

Viereck's essay was deliberately provocative – "I have watched the convention of revolt harden into dogmatic ritual", he wrote of the Marxists who he said presided over campus life – but it also contained a sincere entreaty. Published as the Nazi armies were invading Denmark and Norway, it called for a "new conservatism" to combat the "storm of totalitarianism" abroad as well as moral relativism and soulless materialism at home.

— Tom Reiss,

His beliefs are difficult to categorize as they raise questions about what "conservative" really means:

Mr. Viereck's brand of conservatism shunned extremism of either stripe. He was an admirer of the New Deal, a supporter of Adlai Stevenson and an anti-communist who made it clear that he had little use for Sen. Joseph McCarthy ... —Chicago Tribune

According to Tom Reiss, Viereck was right, as he wrote in Conservatism Revisited (1949), that he "had 'opened people's minds to the idea that to be conservative is not to be satanic.' But, he said, 'once their minds were opened, Buckley came in'." In a review of Buckley's 1950 book God and Man at Yale, Viereck wrote:

Yet what is [Buckley's] alternative? Nothing more inspiring than the most sterile Old Guard brand of Republicanism, far to the right of Howard Taft. Is there no "selfish materialism" at all among the National Association of Manufacturers as well as among the "New Deal collectivists" here denounced? Is it not humorless, or else blasphemous, for this eloquent advocate of Christianity, an unworldly and anti-economic religion, to enshrine jointly as equally sacrosanct: "Adam Smith and Ricardo, Jesus and St. Paul?" And why is this veritable Eagle Scout of moral sternness silent on the moral implications of McCarthyism in his own camp?

In 1962, he elaborated upon the differences he saw between real conservatives and those he called pseudo-conservatives. He wrote of

that whole inconsistent spectrum of Goldwater intellectuals and right-radical magazines. Most of them are so muddled they don't even know when they are being 19th-century liberal individualists (in economics) and when they are being 20th-century semi-fascist thought-controllers (in politics). Logically, these two qualities are contradictory. Psychologically, they unite to make America's typical pseudo-conservative rightist ... [ Russell Kirk ] and perhaps half of the new conservatives are bankrupt ... How can one attribute bankruptcy to a growing concern? Indeed, this new American right seems a very successful concern. On every TV station, on every mass-circulation editorial page, the word "conservatism" in the 1960s has acquired a fame, or at least notoriety, that it never possessed before ... Which is it, triumph or bankruptcy, when the empty shell of a name gets acclaim while serving as a chrysalis for its opposite? The historic content of conservatism stands, above all, for two things: organic unity and rooted liberty. Today the shell of the "conservative" label has become a chrysalis for the opposite of these two things: at best for atomistic Manchester liberalism, opposite of organic unity; at worst for thought-controlling nationalism, uprooting the traditional liberties (including the 5th Amendment) planted by America's founders.

In January 2006, Viereck offered this analysis:

I think McCarthy was a menace ... because he corrupted the ethics of American conservatives, and that corruption leads to the situation we have now. It gave the conservatives the habit of appeasing the forces of the hysterical right ... and appeasing them knowingly, expediently. I think that was the original sin of the conservative movement, and we are all suffering from it.

== Death ==
Viereck died on May 13, 2006, in South Hadley, Massachusetts, following a prolonged illness.

== Awards ==
- 1949: Pulitzer Prize for Poetry for Terror and Decorum
- Guggenheim Fellowships in poetry and history

== Works ==
=== In Poetry Magazine ===
- "Graves Are Made to Waltz On," Volume 56, July 1940, Page 185
- "Sonnet for Servants of the Word," Volume 68, September 1946, Page 302
- "Vale," from Carthage, Volume 70, July 1947, Page 182
- "Five Theological Cradle-Songs," Volume 71, December 1947, Page 115
- "Better Come Quietly," Volume 71, December 1947, Page 115
- "Why Can't I Live Forever?," Volume 71, December 1947, Page 115
- "Blindman's Buff," Volume 71, December 1947, Page 115
- "Game Called on Account of Darkness," Volume 71, December 1947, Page 115
- "Hide and Seek," Volume 71, December 1947, Page 115
- "A Sort of Redemption," Volume 72, August 1948, Page 238
- "Elegy to All Sainthood Everywhere," Volume 72, August 1948, Page 238
- "Love Song of Judas Smith," Volume 74, August 1949, Page 256
- "Again, Again!," Volume 80, April 1952, Page 6
- "Girl-Child Pastoral," Volume 81, October 1952, Page 80
- "Nostalgia," Volume 82, April 1953, Page 18
- "Benediction," Volume 85, February 1955, Page 255
- "A Walk on Moss," Volume 87, October 1955, Page 1
- "We Ran All the Way Home," Volume 96, August 1960, Page 265

=== Poetry collections ===
- 1948: Terror and Decorum, winner of the Pulitzer Prize for Poetry in 1949
- 1949: The Poet in the Machine Age
- 1950: Strike Through the Mask! New Lyrical Poems
- 1952: The First Morning, New Poems
- 1953: Dream and Responsibility: Four Test Cases of the Tension Between Poetry and Society
- 1954: The Last Decade in Poetry: New Dilemmas and New Solutions
- 1956: The Persimmon Tree: new pastoral and lyrical poems
- 1961: The Tree Witch: A Poem and Play (First of All a Poem)
- 1967: New and Selected Poems: 1932-1967
- 1987: Archer in the Marrow: The Applewood Cycles of 1967-1987
- 1995: Tide and continuities: Last and First Poems, 1995-1938
- 2005: Door: Poems
- 2005: Strict Wildness: Discoveries In Poetry And History

=== Intellectual history ===
- 1941. Metapolitics: From the Romantics to Hitler. A. A. Knopf.
  - Revised and enlarged edition published by Capricorn Books in 1965 as Metapolitics: The Roots of the Nazi Mind.
  - Expanded edition published by Transaction Publishers in 2004 as Metapolitics: From Wagner and the German Romantics to Hitler.
- 1949. Conservatism Revisited: The Revolt Against Ideology, Transaction Publishers [Rep. by The Free Press, 1962; expanded and revised edition, by Transaction Publishers, 2005, with a major new study of Peter Viereck and conservatism by Claes G. Ryn].
- 1953. Dream and Responsibility: Four Test Cases of the Tension between Poetry and Society, University Press of Washington.
- 1953. Shame and Glory of the Intellectuals, Beacon Press [Rep. by Capricorn Books, 1965; Greenwood Press, 1978; Transaction Publishers, 2006].
- 1956. Conservatism: from John Adams to Churchill, Van Nostrand.
  - Conservative Thinkers: From John Adams to Winston Churchill, Transaction Publishers, 2005.
- 1956. The Unadjusted Man: A New Hero for Americans, Beacon Press [Rep. by. Greenwood Press, 1973].
  - Unadjusted Man in the Age of Overadjustment: Where History and Literature Intersect, Transaction Publishers, 2004.
- 1957. Inner Liberty: The Stubborn Grit in the Machine, Pendle Hill.
- 2011. Strict Wildness: Discoveries in Poetry and History, Transaction Publishers.

=== Select articles ===
- "But—I'm a Conservative!", The Atlantic Monthly, April 1940.
- "On Conservatism: Two Notes," American Quarterly, Vol. 1, No. 3, Autumn, 1949.
- "Soviet-German Collaboration," The Forum, August 1949.
- "The Decline & Immortality of Europe," The Saturday Review, March 3, 1951.
- "Shame and Glory of the Intellectuals," The Reporter, May 27, 1952.
- "Sunrise in the West," The Saturday Review, June 12, 1954.
- "The New American Radicals," The Reporter, December 1954 Rep. in The American Conservative.
- "The Unadjusted Man," The Saturday Review, November 1, 1958.
- "The Crack-Up of American Optimism," Modern Age, Summer 1960.
- "The Split Personality of Soviet Literature," The Reporter, March 15, 1962.
- "Metapolitics Revisited," Humanitas, Volume XVI, No. 2, 2003.
