= James E. Bunce =

American historian (1924–2015)

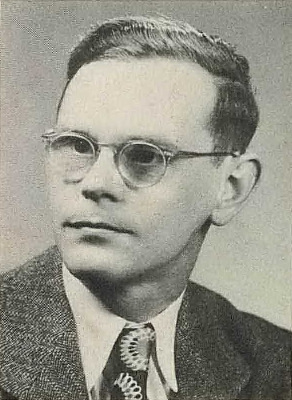
- Born: August 18, 1924; Brooklyn, NY, US
- Died: December 22, 2015 (aged 91); New Rochelle, NY, US
- Resting place: Holy Cross Cemetery
- Occupation: Historian
- Writing career
- Period: 1956 - 1990
- Subjects: American History, British History, Colonial History

James Edward Bunce (August 18, 1924 - December 22, 2015) was an American historian, author, and educator who specialized in British and American colonial history.

== Early life and education ==
Born on August 18, 1924, in Brooklyn, New York, Bunce attended St. John's University (B.A., 1946), and then Fordham University in Bronx, New York, where he received the M.A. (1948), and Ph.D. (1958) in history. His doctoral dissertation ("The Second Rockingham Administration, 1782") was prepared under Professor Ross J. S. Hoffman.

Bunce taught at Seton Hall University from 1947 to 1949 before joining the history faculty at St. John's in 1949, where he remained until his retirement.

== Career ==
At St. John's, he was promoted to assistant professor in 1953, and then to associate professor in 1958. Among the undergraduate and graduate courses that Bunce taught were classes in British history (especially Tudor and Stuart England), 17th and 18th century American history, and British imperialism in Africa. He was a proponent of the "Imperial school" of historians who believed that one needed to study the American colonies as part of the larger British Empire.

He contributed five articles on British history to Catholic Encyclopedia for School and Home (McGraw-Hill, 1965), and a chapter ("Rockingham, Shelburne, and the Politics of Reform, 1779-1780") in Gaetano L. Vincitorio (ed.), Studies in Modern History (St. John's University Press, 1968). Bunce co-edited a Festschrift for his mentor, Ross J. S. Hoffman - Crisis in the "Great Republic": Essays Presented to Ross J. S. Hoffman (Fordham University Press, 1969), to which he also contributed an essay on "The Whigs and the Invasion Crisis of 1779". He also co-edited (along with Richard P. Harmond) Long Island as America: A Documentary History to 1896 (Kennikat Press, 1977). In 1983, he authored a pamphlet, Suffolk County in 1683, for the Suffolk County Tercentenary Commission. He also contributed book reviews to the Catholic Historical Review. Among the doctoral students he supervised at St. John's were Richard Guidorizzi and Brother Harry M. Dunkak, C.F.C., who both taught at Iona College, George Skau, who taught at Bergen Community College, and Rita Loos, who taught at Framingham State College.

== Death ==
Bunce was living in Mount Vernon in Westchester County, New York, and died on December 22, 2015, at age 91. He was buried in Holy Cross Cemetery in Brooklyn, New York on December 30, 2015, in the family grave with his parents, Ralph and Sarah (Sadie) Bunce.
