= Walter L. Willigan =

American historian

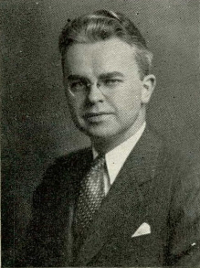
Walter L. Willigan, 1936

Walter Luke Willigan (October 13, 1907 – September 20, 1974) was an American historian, sociologist, and educator who taught at St. John's University for forty years.

== Life and career ==
Willigan was born in Brooklyn, New York, on October 13, 1907, to Luke and Matilda Wieners Willigan. He received an A.B. (1929) from St. Francis College in Brooklyn, and then attended Fordham University in Bronx, New York, where he received the M.A. (1930), and Ph.D. (1934) in history. His doctoral dissertation ("A History of the Irish-American Press from 1691 to 1835") was prepared under Professor John Schuler, a former Methodist Episcopal minister who had gotten his doctorate in philosophy at Columbia and who wrote his dissertation under William H. Carpenter. After getting his master's degree, Willigan began teaching social sciences at Boys High School in Brooklyn in 1930, and also taught some sociology classes at St. John's. He officially joined the faculty at St. John's University in September 1934, first in the Department of Social Sciences (where he taught sociology), and then in the Department of History, in both the graduate school and the school of education. He eventually served as the chairperson of both departments. When he retired in spring 1974, he was designated professor emeritus, and also received the President's Medal. Willigan served as president of the American Catholic Sociological Society in 1942. Among the doctoral students whose dissertations he supervised were Salvatore J. LaGumina, who taught at Nassau Community College; Robert J. Comerford; Joseph W. Coady, who taught at the College of Mount Saint Vincent; Frederick H. Schmauch; Bro. Joseph A. Gaudet; Gary Levine, who taught at Columbia-Greene Community College; Edwin W. Terry, who was the library director at Bronx Community College and Nassau Community College; and Joan B. Werthman, who had ten children and took ten years to finish her doctorate. Willigan and his wife Gertrude were married in 1939. They had two children. Walter L. Willigan and Virginia M. Tarnowki. Shortly after his retirement, he died suddenly of a heart attack at the age of 66. He was buried at St. John Cemetery in Middle Village, Queens.

== Scholarship ==
Willigan's two major publications were textbooks that he co-authored (both with St. John's colleague John J. O'Connor, who would leave for Georgetown University): Sociology (Longmans Green and Company, 1940), and Social Order (Longmans Green and Company, 1941). Both books went through numerous printings. Willigan also edited the manuscript of Introduction to Social Living for publication by the William J. Kerby Foundation, which was based on Monsignor Kerby's unfinished notes on sociology, and was published by Catholic University of America Press in 1948. In 1950, Willigan contributed an article ("Society and the Atom") to a collected work published by St. John's University Press: The Implications of Atomic Energy: Five Essays on the Scientific, Sociological, Legal, Economic and Ethical Implications of Atomic Energy Written by Faculty Members at St. John's University. In 1955, he contributed an article ("Freedom and Labor") to another collective work by St. John's faculty members: Carl W. Grindel (ed.), Concept of Freedom (Henry Regnery Company), a book which was awarded a Washington Medal from the Freedoms Foundation in Valley Forge. Willigan contributed articles on "Government" and "Democracy" to The Catholic Encyclopedia for School and Home (McGraw-Hill, 1965), and articles on "Civil Liberties," and "Political Science" to World Scope Encyclopedia Year Book 1965 (Universal Guild, 1966). He was a technical editor for the Christian Social History Series, which was published by W. H. Sadlier, Inc., in collaboration with the Curriculum Committee of the New York State Council of Catholic School Superintendents. He also edited a series of textbooks for the Sisters of Mercy, Brooklyn Community, that were published by the Bruce Publishing Company in Milwaukee, including America, Land of Achievement (1954). During his academic career, he contributed articles to High Points, The Magnificat, Catholic Association for International Peace News, The Journal of the Brooklyn State Hospital Psychiatric Forum, The Tablet, and Sadlier Educationotes. Willigan's final article was a chapter ("Conscience, Conflict and the Crusades") in Frank J. Coppa, (ed.), Religion in the Making of Western Man (St. John's University Press, 1974), a book which was dedicated by Coppa to him, Arpad F. Kovacs, and Borisz de Balla, "for many years of distinguished and loyal service to St. John’s University, New York." He was also a regular book reviewer for the American Catholic Sociological Review.

== Bibliography ==
- Directory of American Scholars. Sixth edition, Volume 1: History. New York: R.R. Bowker, 1974, p. 682.
- Mihanovich, Clement S. "Who's Who among Catholic Sociologists." American Catholic Sociological Review 12, no. 4 (Dec., 1951): 265–276, in JSTOR.
