= Neil Harris (historian) =

- Born: 1938 (age 87–88)
- Awards: Guggenheim Fellowship (1999)

Academic background
- Education: Columbia University (BA); University of Cambridge (BA); Harvard University (PhD)

Academic work
- Discipline: Cultural history
- Institutions: University of Chicago

Neil Harris (born 1938) is an American cultural historian. He is the Preston and Sterling Morton Professor of History and Art History Emeritus at the University of Chicago.

== Biography ==
Harris received an A.B. from Columbia University in 1958 and studied at Clare College, Cambridge on a Kellett Fellowship, earning a second B.A. in 1960. He then obtained his doctorate from Harvard University in 1965. He wrote his dissertation under Oscar Handlin, which was published into the book The Artist in American Society: the Formative Years, 1790-1860 (1966) that examined the view of art in American society. He taught at Harvard before joining the University of Chicago faculty in 1969. His scholarship has focused on a wide range of topics, including modern American culture, art, art collecting, the history of architecture, technology, and entertainment as well as the development of museums and cultural institutions.

At Chicago, Harris served as chair of the history department from 1985 to 1988 and 2000–01. He retired in 2008 as Preston and Sterling Morton Professor Emeritus in the departments of History and Art History and the Committee on Geographical Studies.

From 1975 to 1977, Harris was director of the National Humanities Institute. In 1978, he was appointed by President Jimmy Carter to the National Museum Services Board of the Institute of Museum and Library Services and was on the board until 1986. He served as chairman of the American Council of Learned Societies, as well as a director of the Terra Foundation for American Art, Newberry Library, Winterthur Museum, Garden and Library, and the National Museum of American History.

Harris was elected a member of the American Academy of Arts and Sciences in 1993. He received a Guggenheim Fellowship in 1999.
