= Arizona John Burke =

American publicist (1842–1917)

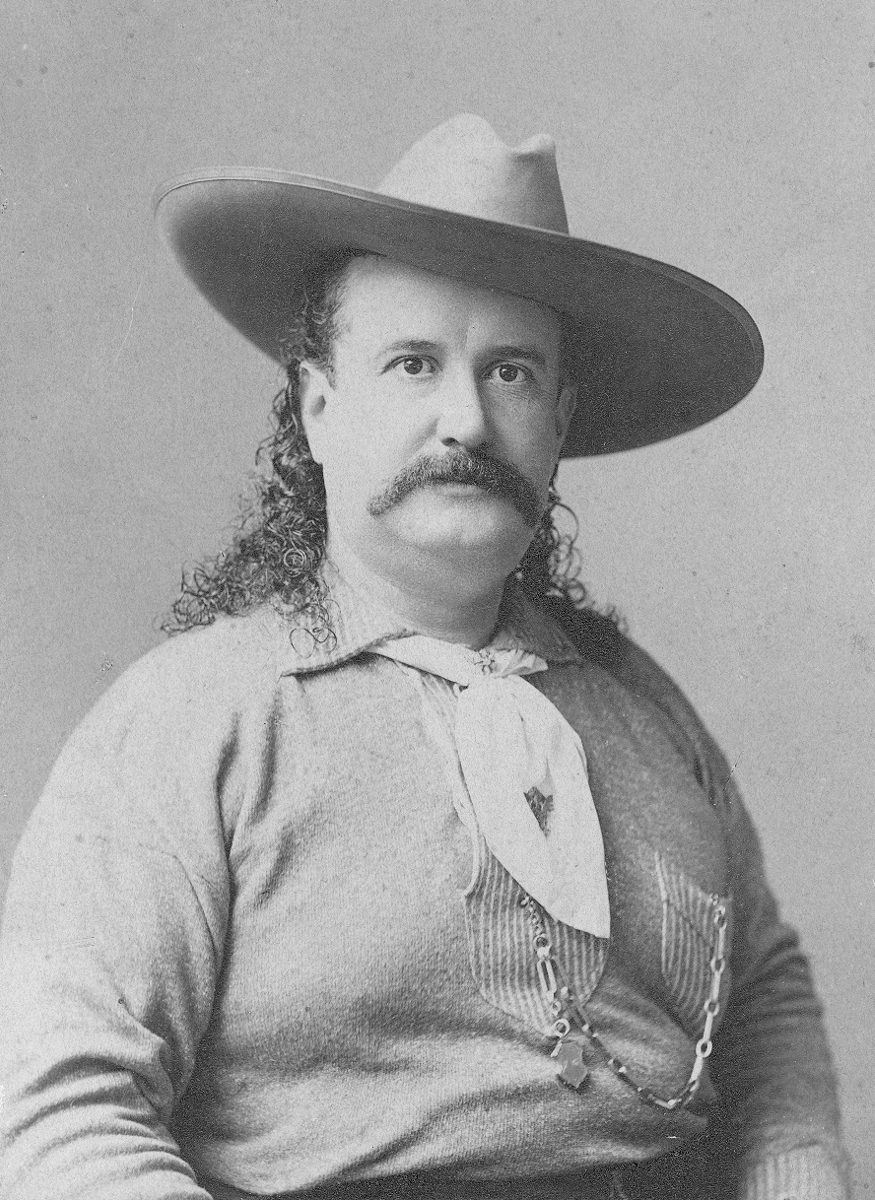
- Burke in 1890
- Born: John M. Burke; 1842; New York City, U.S.
- Died: April 12, 1917 (aged 74–75); Washington, D.C., U.S.
- Resting place: Mount Olivet Cemetery; Washington, D.C., U.S.
- Occupations: Publicist; manager; press agent
- Known for: publicist of Buffalo Bill's Wild West show

John M. Burke (1842 – April 12, 1917), also known as "Arizona John" and "Major John M. Burke" was an American publicist, manager, and press agent. He is best known for his association with Buffalo Bill's Wild West show.

== Early life ==
John M. Burke was born in New York City, in 1842. He was orphaned in infancy after his parents died and was taken in by relatives in Maryland.

== Career ==
In 1866, he made his way west to Montana Territory where he first met William F. "Buffalo Bill" Cody, who was Chief of Scouts for the Third Cavalry. He served Cody as a personal attendant. In 1877, Arizona John was a part of the 'Texas Jack Combination' formed by Texas Jack Omohundro and debuted in St. Louis that year.

Arizona John served as the press agent and publicist for Buffalo Bill Cody's Wild West Show from 1883 until Cody's death in 1917. He would travel ahead of the company meeting with reporters and employed innovating techniques at the time, such as celebrity endorsements, press kits, publicity stunts, op-ed articles, billboards and product licensing, that contributed to the success and popularity of the show.

In 1893 he published a biography of Buffalo Bill titled Buffalo Bill from Prairie to Palace.

Despite being called "Major", Burke never served in the military; similarly, aside from his name, he was not associated with Arizona.

== Death ==
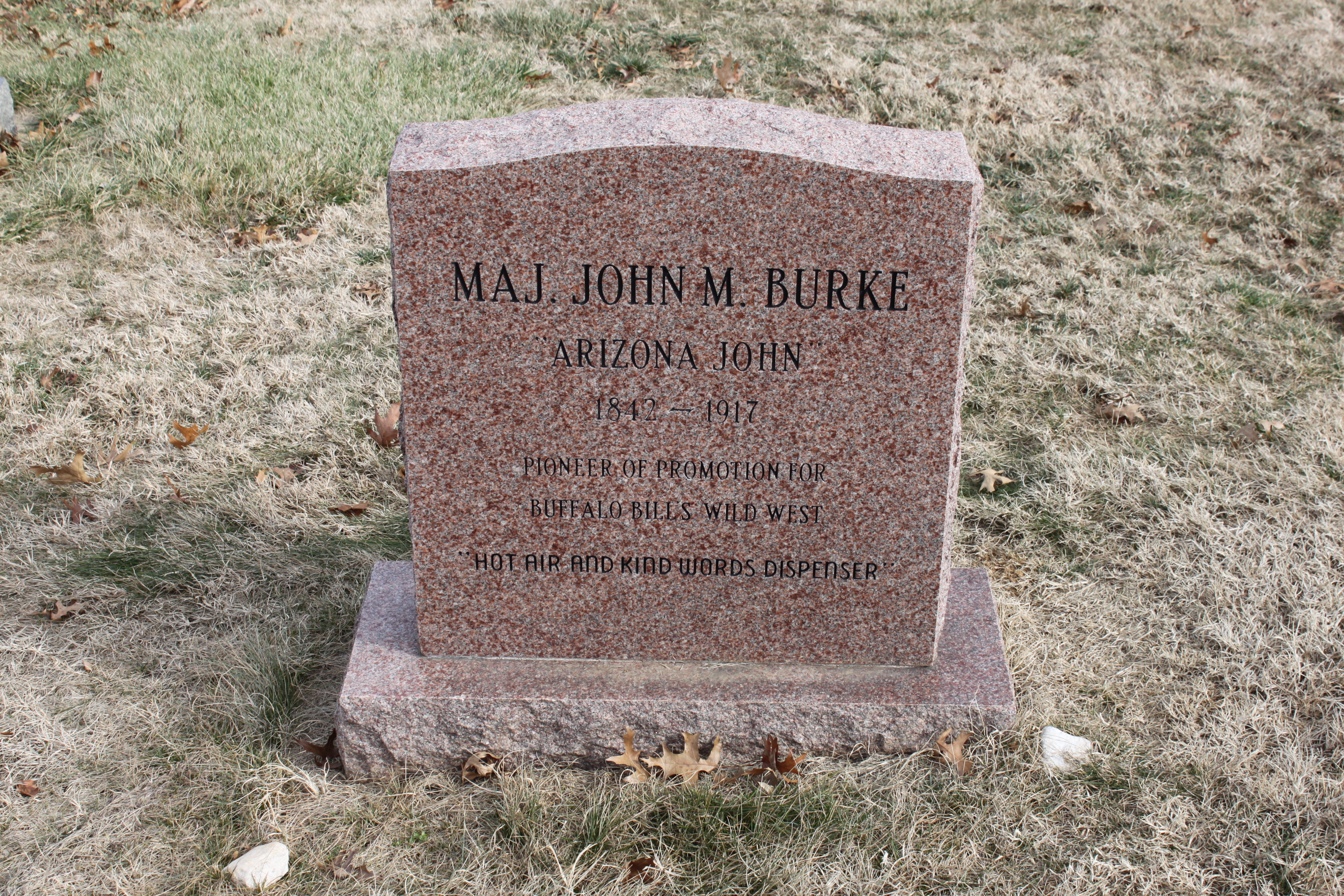
Marker of Burke at Mount Olivet Cemetery

Burke died in Washington, D.C., on April 12, 1917, and was buried in an unmarked grave in Mount Olivet Cemetery. On April 12, 2017, a permanent marker was erected.
