= Janet Elizabeth Richards =

Female Writer and Lecturer

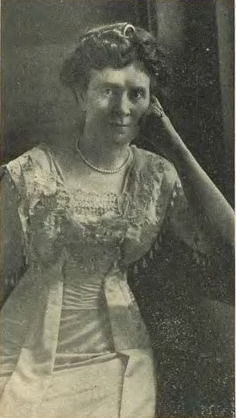
- Born: 1859; Granville, Ohio, U.S.
- Died: 1948 (aged 88–89); Washington, D.C., U.S.
- Resting place: Mount Olivet Cemetery; Washington, D.C., U.S.
- Occupations: Suffragist, lecturer, writer

Janet Elizabeth Richards (1859–1948) was a writer and lecturer who worked in the Eastern United States in the 19th and 20th centuries.

== Biography ==
Janet Elizabeth Richards was born in Granville, Ohio in 1859. She was educated at Eden Hall Academy of the Sacred Heart, an all-girls boarding school in Torresdale, Pennsylvania. The school was described as archaic and prison-like by memoirist V. V. Harrison.

Richards lectured thousands of times in Eastern US cities on social issues, travel, history, and literature. She was a life member of the National American Woman Suffrage Association and delegate to the organization's annual meeting in Seattle in 1909. She traveled to Amsterdam and Stockholm for conventions of the International Woman Suffrage Alliance. She organized for suffrage in several US states. She advocated for women's involvement in International Arbitration.

Richards was a charter member of the Daughters of the American Revolution. In 1892 she published stories of American women's role in the war, highlighting women who exhorted men in their family to do to their duty even at the cost of their own life. Researcher Simon Wendt characterizes Richards's war stories as promoting the idea of heroism of women by reinforcing stereotypes of masculinity connected to war.

Richards resided at The Olympia in Washington D.C. She died in 1948 and is buried in Mount Olivet Cemetery.
