= Mount Olivet Cemetery (Washington, D.C.) =

Catholic cemetery in Washington, D.C.

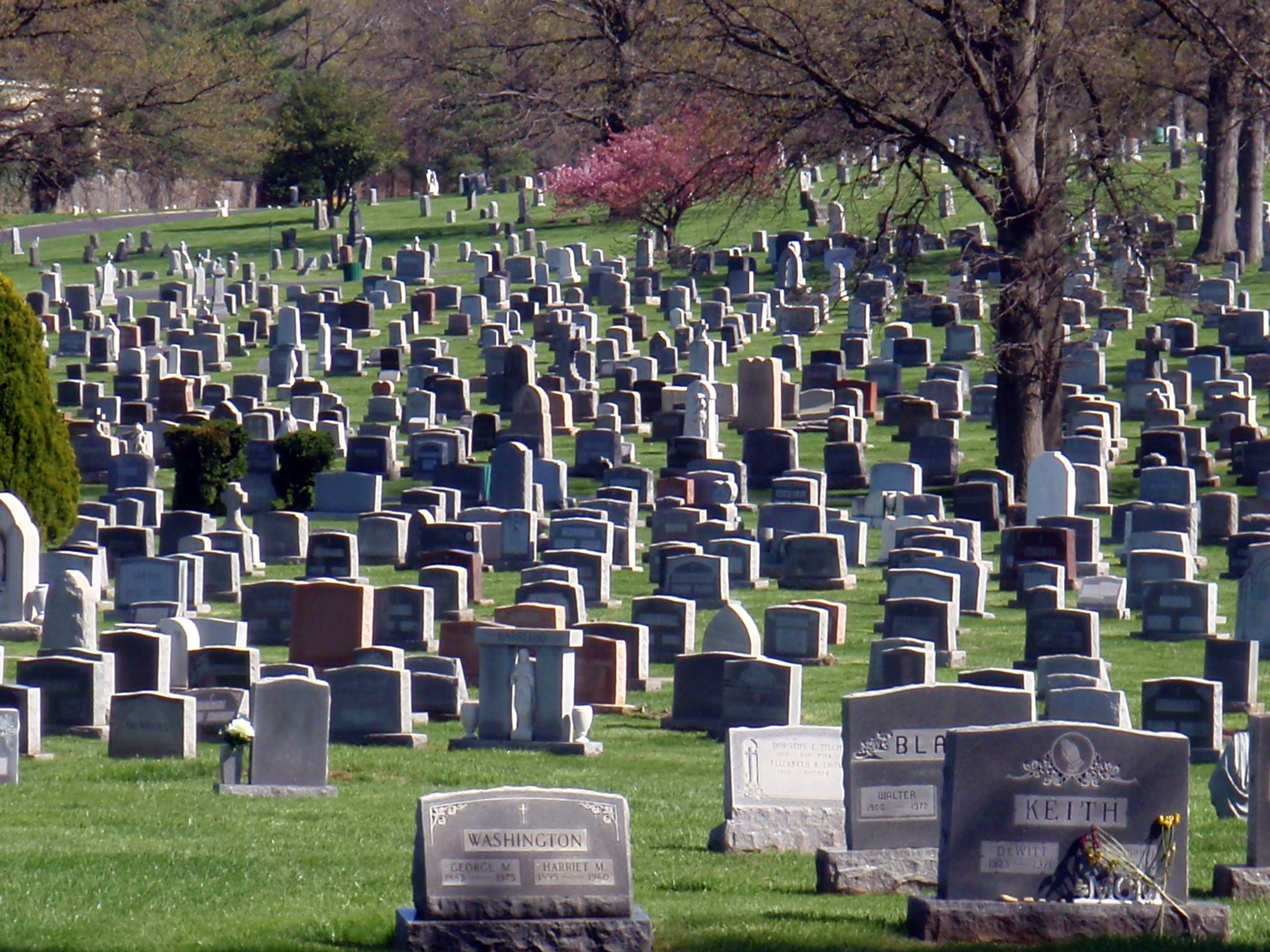
- Mount Olivet Cemetery
- Interactive map of Mount Olivet Cemetery

Details
- Established: 1858
- Location: Ivy City, Washington, D.C.
- Country: United States
- Coordinates: 38°54′41″N 76°58′46″W
- Type: private
- Owned by: Archdiocese of Washington
- Size: 85 acres (340,000 m^{2})
- No. of graves: More than 180,000 (as of November 2019)
- Website: Official website
- Find a Grave: Mount Olivet Cemetery
- The Political Graveyard: Mount Olivet Cemetery

Mount Olivet Cemetery is a historic rural cemetery located at 1300 Bladensburg Road, NE in Washington, D.C. It is maintained by the Roman Catholic Archdiocese of Washington. The largest Catholic burial ground in the District of Columbia, it was one of the first in the city to be racially integrated.

== About the cemetery ==
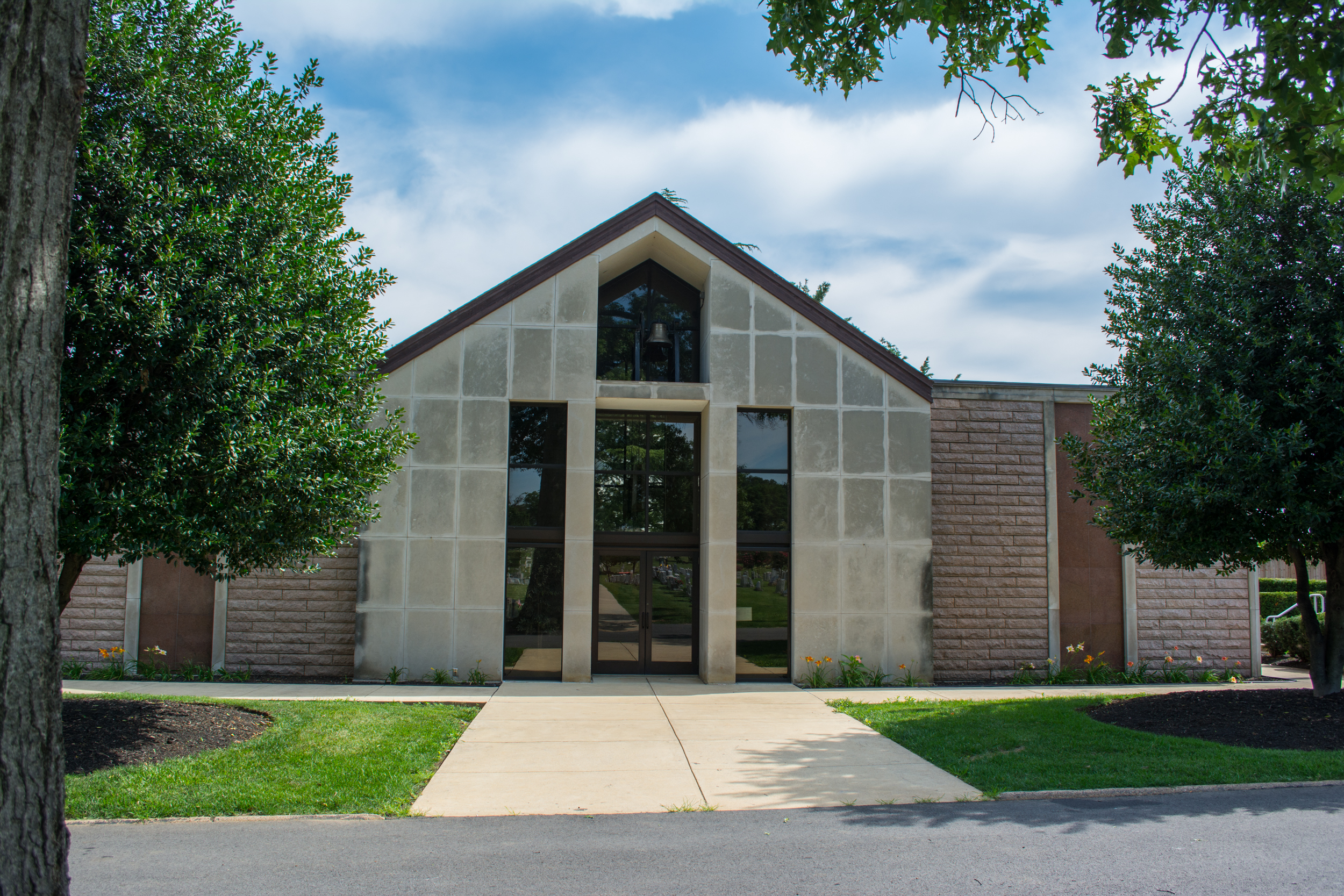
Chapel at Mount Olivet Cemetery.

On June 5, 1852, the Council of the City of Washington in the District of Columbia passed a local ordinance that barred the creation of new cemeteries anywhere within Georgetown or the area bounded by Boundary Street (northwest and northeast), 15th Street (east), East Capitol Street, the Anacostia River, the Potomac River, and Rock Creek. Existing Catholic cemeteries at St. Matthew's Church, St. Patrick Catholic Church, and St. Peter Catholic Church were nearly full. A number of new cemeteries were therefore established in the "rural" areas in and around Washington: Columbian Harmony Cemetery in D.C.; Gate of Heaven Cemetery in Silver Spring, Maryland; Glenwood Cemetery in D.C.; and Woodlawn Cemetery in D.C. Father Charles I. White, the 51-year-old priest who had led St. Matthew's Roman Catholic Church since 1857, was the individual most responsible for the creation of Mt. Olivet.

The cemetery was created in 1858. The Roman Catholic Archdiocese of Baltimore, which then covered the District of Columbia, purchased 40 acres (0.16 km^{2}) of Fenwick Farm for the cemetery. A gray stone lodge was built to mark the entrance. Because the burial grounds at St. Matthew's, St. Patrick, and St. Peter churches were all full by that time, a number of graves were moved to the newly established Mount Olivet in order to make room at the old cemeteries for new burials.

Mount Auburn Cemetery, a rural cemetery near Boston, Massachusetts, was the model for Mount Olivet. During the late 19th and early 20th centuries, Mount Olivet was known as one of the "big five" cemeteries in Washington, D.C.

From the start, Mount Olivet was racially integrated. Most cemeteries in the city were not. More than 7,700 African Americans were buried at Mount Olivet between 1800 and 1919 (about 7.6 percent of all African American burials in the city). In comparison, 24,000 Caucasians were buried there during the same period. Mount Olivet was the only racially integrated cemetery from the 19th century to remain active as of 1989, although this changed in 2019 when Holy Rood Cemetery in Georgetown opened a columbarium.

== Notable interments ==
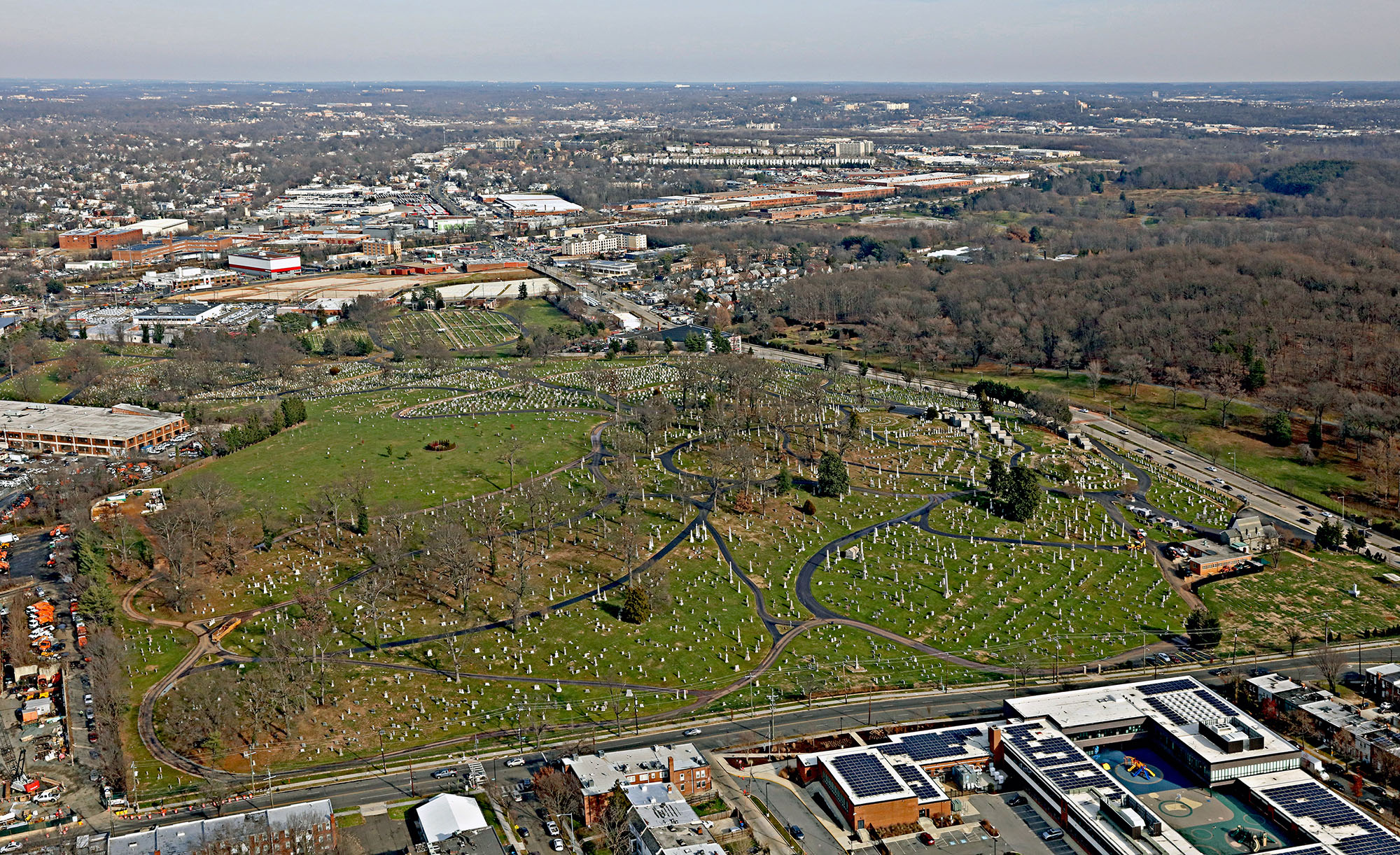
Mt. Olivet Cemetery, NE Washington, D.C.

- Timothy T. Ansberry (1871–1943), U.S. Representative from Ohio
- Arizona John Burke (1842–1917), 19th century promoter, press agent, and manager who created the persona and managed the career of William Frederick "Buffalo Bill" Cody
- Thomas Carbery (1791–1863), sixth mayor of Washington, D.C.
- Thomas H. Carter (1854–1911) U.S. Senator (R, Montana)
- Orlando E. Caruana (1844–1917), medal of honor recipient of the American Civil War
- Michael Walsh Cluskey (1832–1873), member of the Confederate States Congress
- Joseph A. Conry (1868–1943), U.S. Representative from Massachusetts
- Sadie Crawford (1885–1965), performer during the early jazz era
- Ralph Hunter Daughton (1885–1958), U.S. Representative from Virginia
- Ella Loraine Dorsey (1853–1935), American author and journalist
- James F. Duhamel (1858–1947), state politician from New York
- Julius Peter Garesché (1821–1862), Civil War soldier of the Union Army
- Louis de Geofroy (1822–1899), French diplomat who served as the French ambassador to China
- Floyd Gibbons (1887–1939), war correspondent for the Chicago Tribune during World War I
- John Gilroy (1875–1897), Major League Baseball pitcher and outfielder
- Josefina Guerrero (1917–1996), spy during World War II
- James Hoban (c.1758–1831) Original Architect of the White House.
- Jan Karski (1914–2000), Polish World War II resistance movement fighter and later professor at Georgetown University
- Charles A. Korbly (1871–1937), U.S. representative from Indiana
- Stephen Latchford (1883–1974), diplomat and lawyer
- Watty Lee (1879–1936), Major League Baseball player
- Michael Joseph Lenihan (1865–1958), U.S. Army officer during World War I
- John M. Lloyd (c.1835/36–1892), Lincoln assassination government witness
- Seraphim Masi (1797–1884), American silversmith
- William Matthews (1770–1854), seventh President of Georgetown College and first British-American-born Catholic priest
- Joseph McKenna (1843–1926), U.S. Supreme Court justice
- Izydor Modelski (1889–1962) Polish general and spy
- James Mooney (1861–1921), ethnologist, wrote about Cherokee myths and the Ghost Dance
- Jeremiah J. Murphy (1858–1932), U.S. Army soldier during the Indian Wars
- Pola Nirenska (1910–1992), Polish-American modern dancer and wife of Jan Karski
- John J. O'Connor (1904–1978), American historian and educator
- Robert Emmet Odlum (1851–1885), first person to jump from Brooklyn Bridge
- Henry T. Oxnard (1860–1922), president of American Beet Sugar Company
- Francisco Pizarro Martínez (1787–1840), Mexican ambassador to the United States (1837–1840).
- Thomas Devin Reilly (1823–1854), Irish nationalist involved in Young Ireland Movement
- Janet Elizabeth Richards (1859–1948), suffragist, author and lecturer
- Charlie Ross (1885–1950), Harry S. Truman's press secretary
- John Hennessy Saul (1819–1897), American horticulturist and landscape architect
- William Russell Smith (1815–1896), U.S. representative from Alabama
- Mary Surratt (1823–1865), Lincoln assassination conspirator
- James Theodore Talbot (1825–1862), American soldier in the Mexican–American War
- Edward Welsh (1843–1929), Civil War soldier of the Union Army
- Charles Ignatius White (1807–1878), American editor, historian and Catholic priest
- Henry Wirz (1822–1865), Confederate officer and convicted war criminal
- Robert Wynne (1851–1922), United States Postmaster General
- One British Commonwealth war grave of a Canadian Army soldier of World War II.
- Zeng Qi (1892–1951), politician in Republican China. The founder and chairman of the Young China Party.

== See also ==
- List of burial places of justices of the Supreme Court of the United States

== Bibliography ==
- Bergheim, Laura. The Washington Historical Atlas: Who Did What, When and Where in the Nation's Capital. Rockville, Md.: Woodbine House, 1992.
- Johnson, Abby Arthur. "'The Memory of the Community': A Photographic Album of Congressional Cemetery." Washington History. 4:1 (Spring/Summer 1992), pp. 26–45.
- Rash, Bryson B. Footnote Washington: Tracking the Engaging, Humorous, and Surprising Bypaths of Capital History. McLean, Va.: EPM Publications, 1983.
- Richardson, Steven J. "The Burial Grounds of Black Washington: 1880–1919." Records of the Columbia Historical Society. 52 (1989), pp. 304–326.
- Truett, Randle Bond. Washington, D.C.: A Guide to the Nation's Capital. New York: Hastings House, 1942.
