= Seraphim Masi =

American silversmith

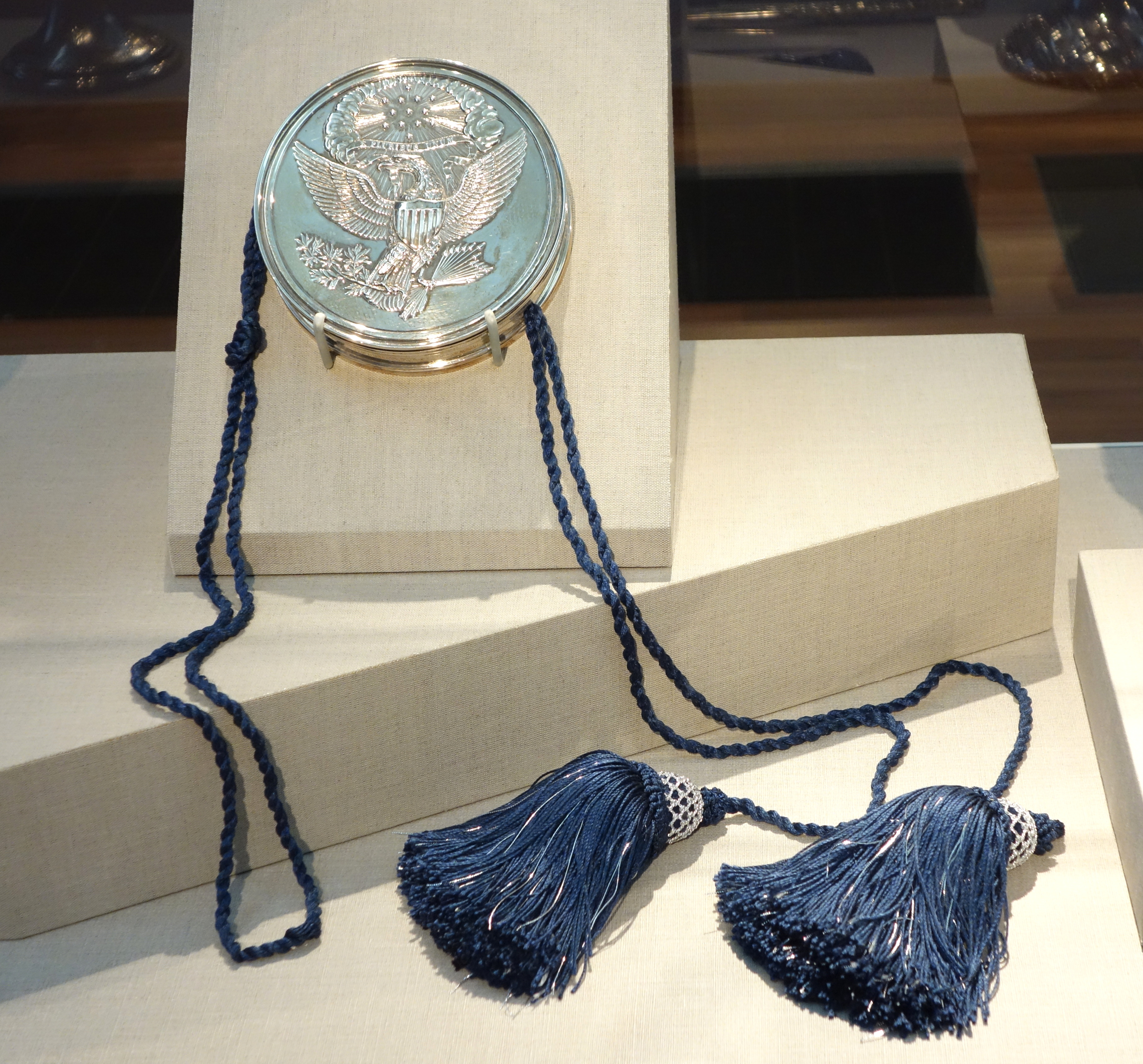
Treaty Seal skippet by Seraphim Masi, c. 1845-1871

Seraphim Masi (1797 – February 27, 1884) was an American silversmith, active in Washington, D.C. He is best known for creating the second Treaty Seal of the United States in 1825.

== Early life ==
Seraphim Masi was born in Frascati, Italy.

== Career ==
Masi worked from 1822-1870 as a silversmith and jeweler in Washington. In 1822 he advertised in the Washington Directory as a "Watchmaker and Jeweler" who sold silver work, spectacles and "a variety of other fancy goods." In 1827 he was listed in the city directory as having his shop on the north side of Pennsylvania Avenue between 4 1/2 and 6 West. A letter from the United States Treasury Department, dated March 22, 1884, i.e., shortly after his death, appears to indicate that he had been receiving a pension as a veteran of the War of 1812.

Masi's most famous work was the second Treaty Seal of the United States, 1825, his version of the Great Seal of the United States. It was used for making red-wax pendent seals for treaties until 1871, when the government ceased using pendant seals and retired the die. On May 5, 1825, the United States Department of State paid him $406 "for Treaty Boxes & a great Seal." It is now in the National Archives collection. Each wax pendant seal was protected within a circular metal skippet, usually sterling silver, although a few were solid gold; the skippet cover bore a replica of the seal. In addition to his other creations, Masi also held a contract to attend, regulate, and repair the clocks of the United States Senate.

His work is collected in the De Young Museum, National Archives, Winterthur Museum, and Yale University Art Gallery.

== Personal life and death ==
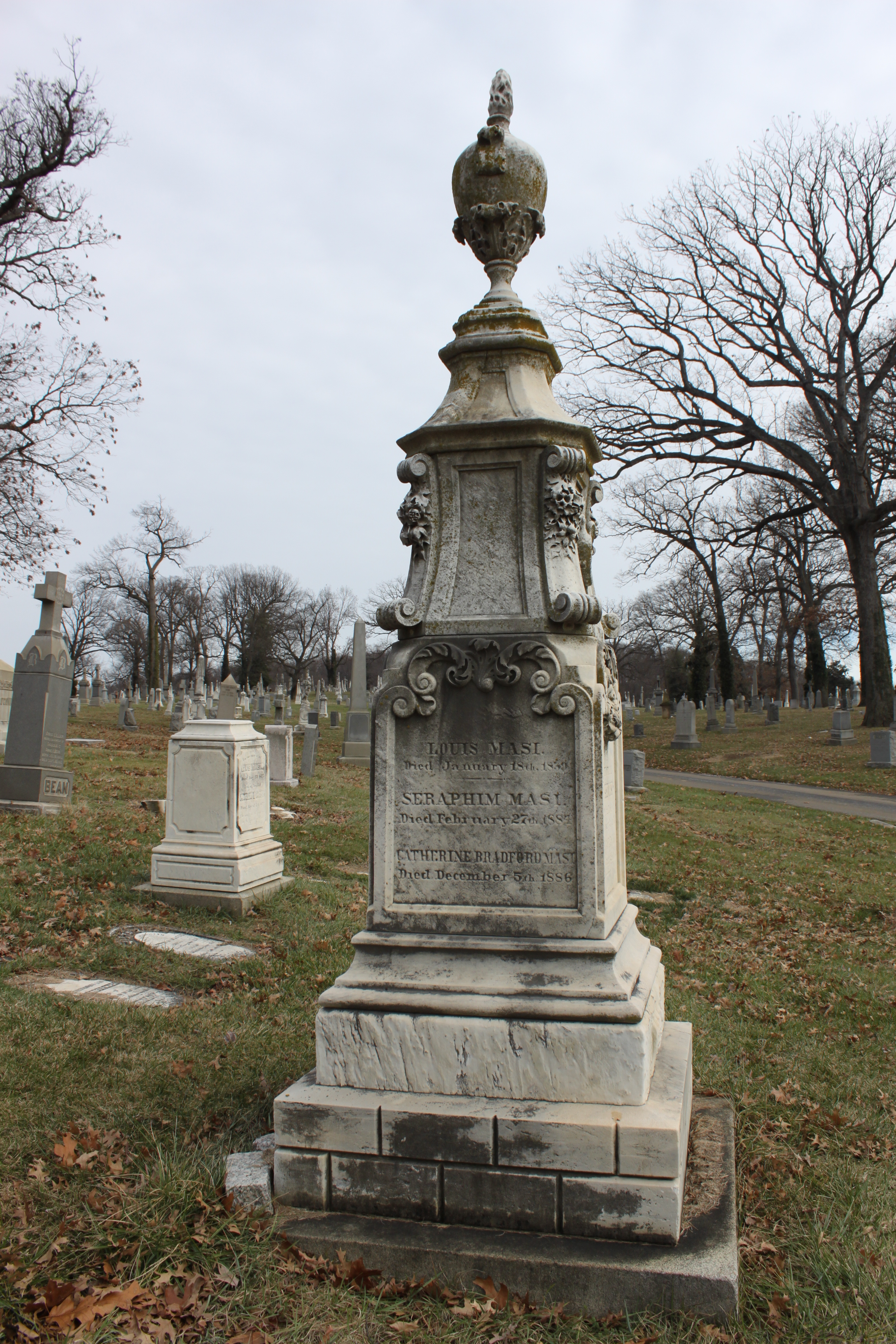
Grave of Masi at Mount Olivet Cemetery

Masi married Catherine Agnes Bradford on November 8, 1825, and was buried in the Mount Olivet Cemetery in Washington.
