= Richard P. Harmond =

American historian

Richard Peter Harmond (March 19, 1929 – June 8, 2022) was an American historian, author, and educator who specialized in the history of the American Gilded Age, as well as the history of technology and the environment.

== Life and career ==
Harmond was born in the Bronx, New York, to William Harmond and Violet (Makein) Harmond, who had married in 1925. After receiving a Bachelor’s degree from Fordham University (1951), he served in the United States Army (1951-1953) before enrolling at Columbia University, where he received the M.A. (1954) and the Ph.D. (1966). His doctoral dissertation, “Tradition and Change in the Gilded Age: Political History of Massachusetts, 1878-1893,” was supervised by William E. Leuchtenburg. Harmond began teaching at St. John's University in Jamaica, Queens, New York, in 1957 as an instructor and remained there until his retirement in 2003, when he was granted Professor Emeritus status. He was an active member of the Organization of American Historians, the Society for the History of Technology, the Theodore Roosevelt Association (where he served as a Trustee from 1994-1997), and Phi Alpha Theta, the history honor society. Harmond was also deeply involved in local Long Island history, serving as associate editor and then editor at large of the Long Island Historical Journal, as well as editor of the LIAC Newsletter from the Long Island Archives Conference. Harmond was a long-time trustee of the Bay Shore-Brightwaters Public Library and died at age 93 in Bay Shore, Long Island.

== Scholarship ==
Many of Harmond’s early articles were extensions of his doctoral research, such as “The Time They Tried to Divide Beverly,” published in the Essex Institute Historical Collections (1968), and “Troubles of Massachusetts Republicans during the 1880s,” in Mid-America (1974). However, his interests also began to spread into social history, as evidenced by the subject of his most widely cited article, “Progress and Flight: An Interpretation of the American Cycle Craze of the 1890s,” published in the Journal of Social History, as well as “Playing and Watching in the Gilded Age: The Beginnings of the Modern Era of Sports in America,” a chapter he contributed to Cities in Transition: From the Ancient World to Urban America, edited by his St. John’s colleague Frank J. Coppa and former colleague Philip C. Dolce (1974). He spent many years examining the Roosevelt papers in Oyster Bay and wrote several biographical profiles of Robert Barnwell Roosevelt, an uncle of President Theodore Roosevelt, as well as other members of the Roosevelt family and Long Island historical topics. He also expanded his scholarship into environmentalism. Working with the Roosevelt family papers led him to discover several letters from famous people that had never been published, including a letter to Robert Roosevelt from Bret Harte.

Harmond co-authored 2 books with his St. John’s history department colleague Thomas J. Curran: A History of Memorial Day: Unity, Discord and the Pursuit of Happiness (Peter Lang, 2002), and Environmentalism and the Government (Krieger Publishing, 2005). He also co-edited 4 books: Long Island as America: A Documentary History to 1896, with James E. Bunce (Kennikat Press, 1977); Technology in the Twentieth Century, with Frank J. Coppa (Kendall/Hunt, 1983); Biographical Dictionary of American and Canadian Naturalists and Environmentalists, with Keir B. Sterling, George A. Cevasco, and Lorne F. Hammond (Greenwood Press, 1997); and Modern American Environmentalists: A Biographical Encyclopedia, with George A. Cevasco (The Johns Hopkins University Press, 2009). In 1984, he authored a pamphlet, Suffolk County at the Time of its Bicentennial - 1883, for the Suffolk County Tercentenary Commission.

Writing in the journal Isis, the reviewer Thomas R. Dunlap noted that the Biographical Dictionary of American and Canadian Naturalists and Environmentalists was "an impressive achievement," and that "Anyone working in the history of field biology, exploration, nature writing, or nature study will find this dictionary extremely useful. It enables the reader to check details rapidly and identify unfamiliar names quickly, and it also provides an occasional research lead. The editors are to be commended for producing an excellent reference work that scholars will rely on for many years to come." The reviewer Mark V. Barrow Jr., writing in the journal History and Philosophy of the Life Sciences, commented that Modern American Environmentalists: A Biographical Encyclopedia was "a convenient and extremely useful compilation that anyone interested in the history of American environmentalism will want to own and keep close at hand." In a German-language review of A History of Memorial Day: Unity, Discord and the Pursuit of Happiness in Amerikastudien / American Studies, Christiane Rösch described it as "erratic" and "difficult to follow," and noted that, "The authors miss the chance to embed Memorial Day in a larger discussion of the culture of remembrance, collective memory and the establishment of national holidays, their rituals and the instrumentalization of these in American civil religion or to integrate it with the festival culture and function of July 4 or even to be compared with other national holidays." In the Journal of American Culture, reviewer Ray Browne, however, calls that book "a fine outline" and "well worth scanning."

Among the many journals Harmond contributed articles to are Journal of the History of the Behavioral Sciences; New York Historical Society Quarterly; History Teacher; Journal of Long Island History; Long Island Historical Journal; Long Island Forum; New York Irish History; Notes and Queries; Theodore Roosevelt Association Journal; and University of Mississippi Studies in English.

He was a prolific contributor of articles to biographical dictionaries and encyclopedias, including Biographical Dictionary of Social Welfare in America (1986); St. James Guide to Biography (1991); The Literature of Nature: An International Sourcebook (1998); The Sixties in America (1999); Historical Dictionary of the Gilded Age (2003); African American Lives (2004); The Seventies in America (2006); New Catholic Encyclopedia Supplement 2010 (2010); and New Catholic Encyclopedia Supplement 2011 (2011). He also contributed to both projects that continued the previous Dictionary of American Biography, writing articles for several volumes of The Scribner Encyclopedia of American Lives, as well as for the American National Biography. The latter of which published some of his articles in print and others in the online edition.

== Students ==
Among the many graduate students that Harmond mentored and advised over the years at St. John's is historian Gregory Dehler, the author of two books, who has written that, "I first learned to be an historian at St. John’s University in Jamaica, New York where I earned both my bachelor’s and master’s degrees," and "I will forever be interested in good historical biographies. I will always want to know who the actors of the past were through accounts of their lives. I am eternally grateful to my professors at St. John’s for showing me this approach to our craft."

Although Harmond specialized in the Progressive Era of American History, one of the graduate students who worked under him (Geoffrey Cahn) and whose dissertation he supervised specialized in German history – Cahn's dissertation topic was "Weimar Culture and Society as Seen Through American Eyes. Weimar Music: The View From America." Aside from teaching for several decades, Cahn went on to found The Holocaust Reconciliation Project to help the current generation of Germans deal with the guilt or shame they may have from previous generations.
