= Josefina Guerrero =

Filipino spy (1917–1996)

- Born: August 5, 1917; Lucban, Tayabas, Philippine Islands
- Died: June 18, 1996 (aged 78); Washington, D.C., U.S.
- Resting place: Mount Olivet Cemetery
- Military career
- Allegiance: United States; Philippines
- Conflicts: World War II

Josefina Guerrero (August 5, 1917 – June 18, 1996) was a Filipino spy during World War II. Guerrero had leprosy and was an unsuspicious and effective surveillance asset for American allied forces. In 1948, she made history as the first foreign national with leprosy to receive a U.S. visa, and her admission to the Carville Leprosarium was accompanied by significant media attention.

== Early and personal life ==
Josefina Guerrero was born on August 5, 1917, in Lucban in Quezon. She was religious and revered Joan of Arc; as a child, she also fantasized she was a heroine. Upon her parents' sudden and early deaths, she was taken in by the Congregation of Our Lady of Charity of the Good Shepherd. After she had contracted tuberculosis, the nuns were unable to care for her, and her grandparents looked after her. Once she recovered, she was sent to Manila to be educated at a convent. Guerrero enjoyed art, poetry and music and actively participated on sports teams. She was described by many as attractive, lively and jolly.

On April 21, 1934, she married an affluent medical student, Renato Maria Guerrero, the son of a renowned doctor, Manuel S. Guerrero. She was sixteen years old, and he was twenty-six. They had a daughter two years later.

In 1941, Guerrero was diagnosed with Hansen's disease (leprosy). Her husband immediately moved out, and she was separated from their daughter—leprosy was highly stigmatized at the time.

== War ==
As the Japanese invaded the Philippines in 1942, there was a shortage of medical supplies. Guerrero lost access to medication; she felt hopeless and depressed until she decided that if she was going to die, she would die with honor. She reached out to a friend, expressing her desire to become a soldier, and tracked down a man who was a member of the resistance. Guerrero was twenty-four. The man responded that they did not accept children. Guerrero retorted that he would be surprised what children can do, reminding him that Joan of Arc was a young girl. She joined as a spy, working as a courier to deliver important news about the war to Filipinos. She memorized the appearances of the Imperial Japanese army men and reported their troop movements.

As Guerrero's disease worsened, the Japanese soldiers who were aggressive towards her avoided her as soon as they saw the telltale lesions on her skin. The Japanese frequently conducted full body searches of Filipinos, but they left Guerrero alone when she told them of her disease. Guerrero successfully transmitted secret messages, information, weapons, and vital supplies to the resistance and soldiers. Her tasks later escalated to mapping out Japanese gun emplacements and fortifications.

On September 21, 1944, the Americans successfully used her map to crush the Japanese defenses in Manila Harbour. Months later, Guerrero was sent on her most dangerous mission—to bring a map of minefields to American headquarters, 35 miles (56 km) away. The map would help ensure the safety of the Americans as they proceeded to Manila to end the Japanese occupation. Guerrero accepted the task. She walked and reached the town of Hagonoy 25 miles (40 km) into her journey. The area was an active combat zone; she rode a boat which had to outrun river pirates. After landing on the coast, she walked 8 miles (13 km) to her final destination, Calumpit, and realized that the Americans had already progressed to Malolos. She walked further to Malolos and gave the map to Captain Blair of the 37th Infantry Division. She suffered paralyzing fatigue and headaches throughout her journey.

At the Battle of Manila, Guerrero tended wounded soldiers and civilians and carried children to safety, all while avoiding flying bullets.

== Post-war ==
Because of Guerrero's disease, she was sent to Tala Leprosarium in Novaliches. The institution was filthy, and there was no running water or electricity. It was crowded, and only four nurses looked after 650 patients. Necessities such as food, clothing and bedding were insufficient.

Guerrero devoted her time cleaning around the facility. She also helped build coffins for those who died. She wrote a letter to a friend's connection in the US about conditions at the leprosarium. Her letter was forwarded to chaplains at the Carville National Leprosarium in Louisiana, where it was circulated and reached a local publication, Manila Times. The newspaper's front page published an exposé by Arsenio Lacson about the institution. Several other mass media sources then reported the story, prompting the local government to investigate. The leprosarium was subsequently renovated. The facilities were cleaned up and improved—new beds were provided, food rations increased, telephones installed, and more medical personnel were added.

After hearing from chaplains at the Carville National Leprosarium and learning about the medical breakthroughs concerning leprosy treatment in the United States, Guerrero felt hopeful again. She persisted and became the first foreign national with leprosy to obtain an American visa. In 1948, she became the first foreigner admitted to the Carville National Leprosarium. Within the same year, Guerrero's wartime feats and struggles with leprosy were featured in Time magazine, and she was awarded the Medal of Freedom with a Silver Palm. Guerrero was diagnosed with an advanced case of leprosy, which required nine years of treatment at Carville National Leprosarium. She was discharged in 1957.

Guerrero became an activist for destigmatizing leprosy. Upon her recovery, Guerrero sought employment, but potential employers would shun her once they discovered her history with the disease. Guerrero was also subjected to deportation back to the Philippines. Her supporters, consisting of military members, the press and lawyers, campaigned for her permanent residency in the US. She was granted citizenship in 1967.

Guerrero eventually left the public eye and lived a life of obscurity, maintaining privacy about her former life. She met her adult daughter only once when she visited her in the US. She remarried and never returned to the Philippines.

== Death ==
Guerrero died at George Washington University Medical Center on June 18, 1996, and was buried at Mount Olivet Cemetery. Her address book included no one she had known before the 1960s; she said she had left her painful past behind.
