= John J. O'Connor (historian) =

American historian

John Joseph O'Connor (November 9, 1904 – June 5, 1978) was an American historian, sociologist, author, and educator who specialized in social justice and improving relations between different racial and religious groups.

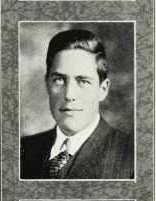
John J. O'Connor (historian),1926

== Early life ==
O'Connor was born in Washington, D.C. to John D. O'Connor and Mary Roche O'Connor. He attended Georgetown University and received an A.B. (1926), A.M. (1927), LL.B. (1931), and Ph.D. (1936). His dissertation topic was Persecution in the Reign of Mary Tudor.

== Academic career ==
After receiving his master's degree, O'Connor began his teaching career at Georgetown where he progressed from instructor of history to assistant professor (1927–1936). He then moved to St. John's University as assistant professor (1936–1939), and then became associate professor and chair of the history department (1939–1943). After serving for two years in the Ordnance Department of the U.S. Army (1943–1945), he returned to Georgetown as a history professor in the School of Foreign Service, where he remained until his retirement in 1967.

== Scholarship ==
O'Connor was the author or co-author of several books, including Twenty-Five in Ireland (Brent Knold Press, 1932); Catholic Revival in England (Macmillan, 1942); and two textbooks that he co-authored with St. John's University colleague Walter L. Willigan: Sociology (Longmans Green and Company, 1940), and Social Order (Longmans Green and Company, 1941). The latter two books both went through numerous printings. He was also managing editor of Logistics (1945–1947), and a contributor to America, Commonweal, Ave Maria, and Magnificat, and he contributed a chapter to The Catholic Bookman's Guide: A Critical Evaluation of Catholic Literature (Hawthorn Books, 1962). He was a regular book reviewer for the American Catholic Sociological Review.

== Awards ==
O'Connor was a founder and secretary of the Catholic Interracial Council of Washington, D.C., and for his work in improving racial relationships he was one of the two winners of the 1949 James Hoey Award from the Catholic Interracial Council of New York City. He also received the Edith Stein Award for intergroup achievements in 1959, and the Brotherhood Award from the National Conference of Christians and Jews in 1961. He received Georgetown's Vincennial Medal in 1960, and the university's President's Medal in 1968.

== Personal and death ==
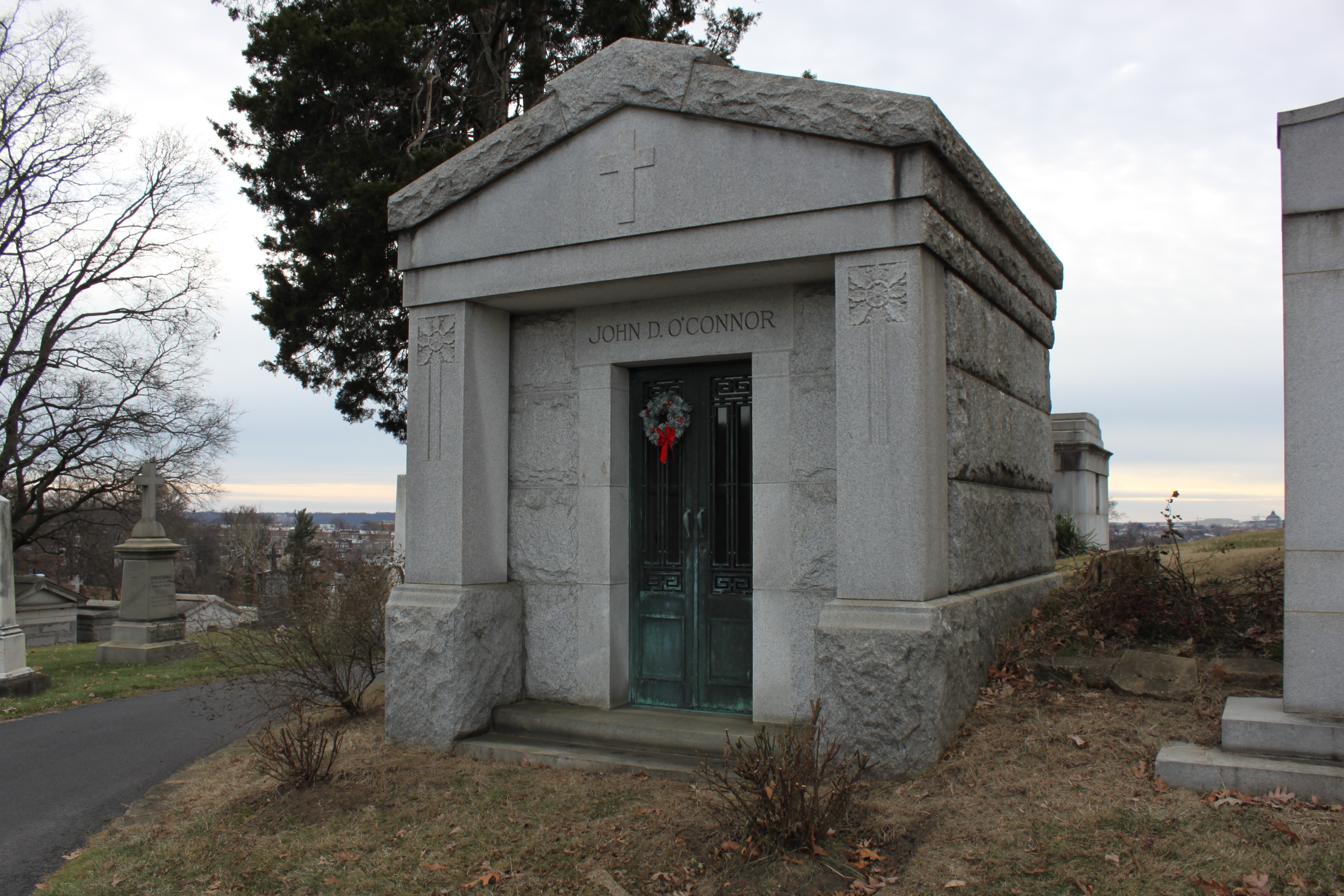
O'Connor family mausoleum at Mount Olivet Cemetery

He married Eleanor Louise Crowley on October 10, 1936. They had seven children.

O’Connor died at age 73 of pneumonia after having suffered a stroke the week before. He is buried in the family mausoleum at Mount Olivet Cemetery in Washington, D.C.
