= Peter J. Stanlis =

American academic

Peter James Stanlis (August 12, 1919 – July 18, 2011) was an American academic noted for his work on Edmund Burke and Robert Frost.

== Early life and academic career ==
Stanlis, the son of Lithuanian immigrants, was raised in Newark, New Jersey. He was awarded his BA degree from Middlebury College and his MA degree from Middlebury's Bread Loaf Graduate School of English. He earned his PhD from Michigan University in 1951, and his doctoral dissertation was an analysis of Edmund Burke. Also in 1951, Stanlis read Russell Kirk's Randolph of Roanoke and found that Kirk, along with Ross J. S. Hoffman, had come to the same conclusions about Burke's politics as himself. They became friends and Kirk wrote the foreword to Stanlis' 1958 work, Edmund Burke and Natural Law. Stanlis dissented from orthodox academic opinion by placing Burke's political thought within the natural law tradition of European thought. He later said that the book contributed to the interpretation of Burke's philosophy as "the basis of modern American political conservatism".

In 1959, he founded the Burke Newsletter (later renamed Studies in Burke and His Time) and in 1963 he published an anthology of Burke's works (Edmund Burke: Selected Writings and Speeches).

Stanlis taught at the University of Detroit from 1953 and was later a member of Rockford College's English faculty for more than 20 years and he was awarded an honorary PhD from the college. He co-founded the American Society for Eighteenth-Century Studies in 1969 and from 1982 until 1988 he served on the National Council for the Humanities, after being appointed by President Reagan. He also served on the Academic Board of the National Humanities Institute and was a research fellow of the British Academy.

From 1939 until his death in 1963, Stanlis was friends with the American poet Robert Frost and he published two works on the poet.

Stanlis served as a councilman in Michigan.

== Works ==
=== Books ===
- Edmund Burke and the Natural Law (Ann Arbor: University of Michigan Press, 1958).
- (editor) Edmund Burke: Selected Writings and Speeches (Garden City, NY: Doubleday and Company, 1963).
- The Relevance of Edmund Burke (New York: P.J. Kenedy, 1964).
- (with Clara I. Gandy) Edmund Burke: A Bibliography of Secondary Studies to 1982 (New York: Garland Publishing, 1983).
- Edmund Burke: The Enlightenment and Revolution (New Brunswick: Transaction Publishers, 1991).
- Robert Frost: The Poet as Philosopher (Wilmington: ISI Books, 2007).
- Conversations with Robert Frost: The Bread Loaf Period (New Brunswick: Transaction Publishers, 2009).

=== Articles ===
- 'Edmund Burke and the Law of Nations', The American Journal of International Law, Vol. 47, No. 3 (Jul., 1953), pp. 397–413.
- 'Comment on Samuel Johnson and "Natural Law"', Journal of British Studies, Vol. 2, No. 2 (May, 1963), pp. 76–83.
- 'British Views of the American Revolution: A Conflict over Rights of Sovereignty', Early American Literature, Vol. 11, No. 2 (Fall, 1976), pp. 191–201.
- 'Robert Frost: The Conversationalist as Poet', The Robert Frost Review, No. 8 (Fall 1998), pp. 22–38.
- 'The Role of Dualism and Metaphor in Robert Frost's Intellectual Life', The Robert Frost Review, No. 10 (Fall 2000), pp. 172–179.
- 'Prelude and Reflections on Robert Frost's "The Black Cottage"', The Robert Frost Review, No. 12 (Fall 2002), pp. 57–65.
