= James Theodore Talbot =

American officer and explorer during the 19th century

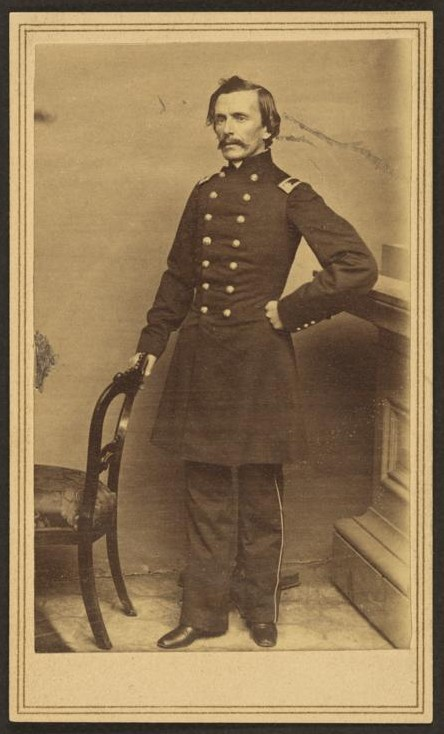
- Theodore Talbot
- Born: December 25, 1825; Washington, D.C., U.S.
- Died: April 22, 1862 (aged 36); Washington, D.C., U.S.
- Burial place: Mount Olivet Cemetery; Washington, D.C., U.S.
- Relatives: Isham Talbot and Adelaide Thomason
- Military career
- Allegiance: American
- Unit: Corps of Topographical Engineers
- Commands: Company H
- Conflicts: Mexican–American War
- Other work: Officer and explorer

James Theodore Talbot (December 25, 1825 – April 22, 1862) was an American officer and explorer during the 19th century.

== Early life ==
James Talbot was born on December 25, 1825, to Isham Talbot and Adelaide Thomason in Washington D.C. He spent some of his youth in Kentucky, attending prestigious boarding schools. James was twelve years old when his father died on the family plantation in Frankfort, Kentucky, and James and his mother Adelaide moved into the mansion in Washington D.C. that had been left to them by Isham. The death of his father at such a young age may have influenced the direction of his entire life and may have been the reason that he left home at such a young age.

== Military career ==
When James turned eighteen, he joined John C. Frémont's expedition into the Oregon Territory, despite pressure from his family to stay in Washington. James served as a member of the Corps of Topographical Engineers along with 38 others during the expedition, and contributed to the detailed and reliable maps created as a result. His journals were among the most detailed and accurate descriptions of the frontier at the time.

He went on the third Fremont expedition, the second for him, but was sent to Vera Cruz for duty in the Mexican–American War, but the war had ended by the time he had arrived. He stayed in Vera Cruz for eight months until being reassigned to Fort Columbus on Governors Island, New York. After two months, he was reassigned to the garrison in Oregon.

He arrived in Astoria in May 1848. According to Army records, he was instructed to survey the coast of Oregon by General Persifor Frazer Smith. He went on assignments like this for a few years followed by long periods of boredom. He left Oregon in December 1852, and was reassigned to recruiting duties outside Washington, D.C., from 1853 to 1854. From 1855 to 1857, he was assigned to Company K of the US First Artillery at Fort McHenry, Maryland. From there they were reassigned to Fort Dallas, Florida, and then to Fort Brooke near Tampa. From there he was reassigned to Company H in Fort Moultrie, South Carolina. There he received full command of the company, but was forced to go on leave because of his declining health.

He was sent to Washington with confidential dispatches of Major Anderson asking for a relief force. On his return, on April 8, he met with Governor Pickens to request that he return to his post at Fort Sumter with the letter from Abraham Lincoln instructing Robert Anderson to hold out until the relief force arrived. Pickens refused, and Talbot was put on a train back to Washington, D.C.

After coming back to Washington, D.C., he was appointed Assistant Adjutant General and as Chief of Staff to Brigadier General Joseph K. Mansfield, Military Commander in the city of Washington.

== Death ==
Shortly after returning to Washington, Talbot contracted tuberculosis, and died on April 22, 1862, aged 36. Talbot was laid to rest at Mount Olivet Cemetery in Washington, D.C.
