= Valentine de Balla =

Hungarian political scientist

Valentine de Balla (October 23, 1899 – November 25, 1957), also known as Valentin de Balla and Valentin Balla de Iregh, was a Hungarian political scientist who taught at several American colleges from the 1930s to the 1950s.

Born on October 23, 1899, in Újvidék, Hungary (today in Serbia), de Balla graduated from the Theresian Military Academy in Wiener Neustadt, and then from the Sorbonne in Paris, where he studied international law. He then studied at Johns Hopkins University, where he received the Ph.D. (1931). His dissertation, "The New Balance of Power in Europe," was published the following year by The Johns Hopkins Press.

His younger brother, Borisz de Balla, was a diplomat, journalist, novelist, and historian who taught at Loyola College, Le Moyne College, and St. John's University. His parents were Aladar de Balla and Dora Paul de Balla. Aladar was a former minister of the interior, member of parliament, and diplomat, serving as the Hungarian ambassador in Zagreb.

De Balla was in Hungary during both Third Reich and Soviet occupations. He was trapped in Budapest during the two-month German siege, and later worked with Cardinal Mindszenty in the underground, and then with the Spanish Legation in Hungary assisting Jews. After two years under Soviet rule, de Balla escaped Hungary in 1946 in the private airplane of an American general. He returned to Hungary in the mid-1950s and, with the help of the underground, was able to get his mother out of Budapest and to the United States. De Balla frequently spoke out against Soviet control of Hungary and the show trials they often conducted. An ardent Catholic and anti-Communist, de Balla also defended Francoist Spain as “incomparably more human than that of the Soviets,” and argued for military support of the Spanish army, noting that Spain had “the toughest and biggest anti-Communist army in Europe and which only needs modern armaments.”

In America, de Balla was on the research staff of the Walter Hines Page School of International Relations at Johns Hopkins, and then taught political science at St. Peter's College in New Jersey, Notre Dame College in Maryland, and Loyola College in Maryland. He married Katherine Drake Bentley on March 25, 1935, in Washington, D.C. De Balla became a naturalized U.S. citizen in 1948, although he divided his time between Maryland and Hungary. He purchased Flamhof Castle near St. Nikolai, Austria, and was living there at the time of his death in an automobile accident on November 25, 1957.
