= William D. Griffin =

William Denis Griffin (January 19, 1936 – July 12, 2011) was an American historian, author, and educator who specialized in Modern European History, particularly Anglo-Irish political and social history in the eighteenth and nineteenth centuries, Irish history, and the revolutionary era.

== Life and career ==
Born on January 19, 1936, in Brooklyn, New York, Griffin attended Fordham University in Bronx, New York, where he received the B.A. (1957), M.A. (1959), and Ph.D. (1962) in History. His doctoral dissertation ("John Fitzgibbon, Earl of Clare") was prepared under Professor Ross J. S. Hoffman. Griffin was a National Endowment for the Humanities research fellow during 1967-1968.

Griffin taught at Queens College from 1962-1965 before joining the History faculty at St. John's University in 1965, where he taught for 45 years and achieved the rank of Full Professor in 1982. He was married to Julia Ortiz Griffin, a professor of Spanish language and literature at Queensborough Community College, with whom he collaborated on two books. They had two children.

== Scholarship ==
Griffin's publications ranged from Irish and British history, to military history and Irish-American history. He contributed articles to History Today, Studies in Burke and His Time, The Irish Sword, Bulletin of the Institute of Historical Research, and Studies in Eighteenth-Century Culture, and was Associate Editor of Studies in Burke and His Time from 1970-1975. Griffin authored chapters in several essay collections, including "The Bavarian Protectorate in Greece, 1833-1843" in Studies in Modern History (1968), "Religion and the Expansion of Europe" in Religion in the Making of Western Man (1974), "In Search of the Ultimate Weapon: Military Technology in the Twentieth Century" in Technology in the Twentieth Century (1983), "Voltaire's Soldier of Ill-Fortune: The Lally Affair and the Fate of the Franco-Irish Community" in Voltaire et ses combats: actes du congrès international, Oxford-Paris, 1994 (1997), and a chapter in a Festschrift for his mentor, Ross J. S. Hoffman - "The Forces of the Crown in Ireland, 1798" in Crisis in the "Great Republic": Essays Presented to Ross J. S. Hoffman (1969). Griffin also contributed articles to the Dictionary of Modern Italian History (1985), both editions of the Encyclopedia of New York City (1995, 2010), and was a member of the editorial advisory board for The New York Irish (1996). He published book reviews in Studies in Burke and His Time, the New England Quarterly, the American Historical Review, Eighteenth-Century Studies, Catholic Historical Review, and History: Reviews of New Books. Griffin became Associate Editor of Dictionary of Irish Biography beginning in 1979, and was active in the American Irish Historical Society, where he served as secretary general (1973–74) and then as their librarian and archivist. He was a Fellow of the Royal Society of Antiquaries of Ireland, the chairman of the Middle Atlantic Region of the American Committee on Irish Studies, and held memberships in the International Society for Studies of the Eighteenth Century, the North American Conference on British Studies, the American Historical Association, the American Society for Eighteenth-Century Studies, the Military History Society of Ireland, the Canadian Association for Irish Studies, and the Association of Multi-Ethnic Programs (in which he served as Vice President).

== Bibliography ==
Books authored by Griffin:

- A Portrait of the Irish in America (Charles Scribner's Sons, 1981).
- The Book of Irish Americans (Times Books, 1990).
- The Irish Americans (Hugh Lauter Levin Associates, 1998).
- (co-author with Julia L. Ortiz Griffin) Spain and Portugal Today (Peter Lang, 2003).
- (co-author with Julia L. Ortiz Griffin) Spain and Portugal: A Reference Guide from the Renaissance to the Present (Facts on File, 2007).

Books edited by Griffin:

- (co-editor) From Vienna to Vietnam: War and Peace in the Modern World (Wm. C. Brown Book Company, 1969).
- (editor) The Irish in America, 550-1972: A Chronology & Fact Book (Oceana Publications, 1973).
- (editor) Ireland, 6000 B.C.-1972: A Chronology & Fact Book (Oceana Publications, Inc., 1973).
