= Charles Ignatius White =

American editor, journalist, historian, and Roman Catholic priest

Charles Ignatius White (Baltimore, Maryland, February 1, 1807 – Washington, D.C., April 1, 1878) was an American editor, historian, and Catholic priest. He was one of the leading Catholic publicists in the United States during the second half of the nineteenth century. His publications before the American Civil War were influential in the spread of Catholicism.

== Life ==
His classical studies were made at Mount St. Mary's College, Emmittsburg, and at St. Mary's College, Baltimore, and his theological course at St. Sulpice, Paris, where he was ordained priest on 5 June 1830. Returning to Baltimore soon after his ordination, he was engaged in parish work there and at Pikesville. He served as rector of the Baltimore Cathedral (now the Basilica of the National Shrine of the Assumption of the Blessed Virgin Mary) from in 1842–43. In 1857, he was made rector of St. Matthew's, Washington, remaining in this charge until his death.

In addition to his parochial work he edited the annual Catholic Almanac and Directory (1834–1857); founded the Religious Cabinet, a monthly magazine in Baltimore (1842) which was called the following year the U.S. Catholic Magazine (1843–1847), and revived as the Metropolitan Magazine in 1853.

He was editor of the weekly paper The Catholic Mirror (1850–1855). He translated and published Jaime Lucio Balmes's Protestantism and Catholicity Compared in their Effects on the Civilization of Europe (Baltimore, 1856), and compiled the Life of Mrs. Eliza A. Seton (New York, 1853), founder of the American branch of the Sisters of Charity.

White was buried in Mount Olivet Cemetery.
