= Gaetano L. Vincitorio =

American historian

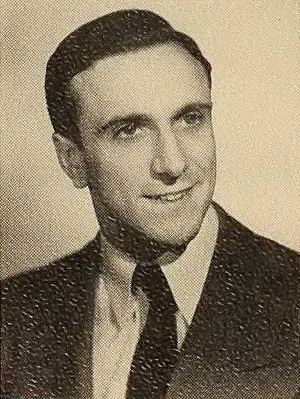
- Born: September 11, 1921; New York City, US
- Died: November 26, 2007 (aged 86); Syosset, New York, US
- Occupation: Historian
- Writing career
- Period: 1950 - 2000
- Subjects: European History, American History, Edmund Burke

Gaetano Leonard "Tom" Vincitorio (September 11, 1921 - November 26, 2007) was an American historian, author, and educator who specialized in Modern European History, particularly the British politician Edmund Burke.

== Life and career ==
Born on September 11, 1921, in Brooklyn, New York, Vincitorio attended St. John's University, where he graduated summa cum laude (B.S., 1942), and was also inducted into the Skull and Circle Honor Society. He then attended Fordham University in Bronx, New York, where he received an M.A. (1943), and Ph.D. (1950) in History. He also took classes at Columbia University in 1946. Vincitorio's doctoral dissertation ("Edmund Burke's International Politics") was prepared under Professor Ross J. S. Hoffman.

After receiving his master's degree, Vincitorio taught history in New York City high schools before being hired to teach history and social sciences at Pace College from 1946 to 1948. He then joined the History faculty at St. John's University in 1948, where he was initially hired to replace the extremely popular Professor George "Doc" Murray, who had unexpectedly died in late 1947. Vicitorio taught at St. John's for forty years and achieved the rank of Full Professor in 1957. He became chair of the history department in 1977.

After publishing two articles on Edmund Burke in 1953 and 1957, Vincitorio then collaborated with his mentor, Ross J. S. Hoffman, and Morrison V. Swift on a textbook, Man and His History: World History and Western Civilization (Doubleday, 1958; revised ed., 1963). He also wrote companion testing volumes for that textbook as well as three others, all of which were published by Doubleday during 1958–1959. After editing a volume of essays by St. John's history faculty, Studies in Modern History (St. John's University Press, 1968), Vincitorio was the editor-in-chief of a Festschrift for Hoffman: Crisis in the "Great Republic": Essays Presented to Ross J. S. Hoffman (Fordham University Press, 1969), to which he contributed a chapter on "Edmund Burke and the First Partition of Poland: Britain and the Crisis of 1772 in the 'Great Republic.'"

Vincitorio then worked to continue James Truslow Adams' The March of Democracy: A History of the United States, which had originally been published in 1932–1933. The publisher, Charles Scribner's Sons, had begun to issue supplements chronicling events in American history since the original set was published, and Vincitorio co-edited Volume 8 (Challenge and Conflict), and then edited Volumes 9 (The Record of 1970-71), 10 (The Record of 1972-73), and 11 (The Record of 1974). He also contributed articles to the Catholic Encyclopedia for School and Home (McGraw-Hill, 1965), The New Catholic Encyclopedia (McGraw-Hill, 1967), and The Italian American Experience: An Encyclopedia (Garland Publishing, 2000), as well as to the journals Long Island Forum, New York Irish History, and Long Island Historical Journal. He served for many years on the editorial board of Review of National Literatures, which was founded and edited by Anne Paolucci.

Vincitorio was a member of the American Historical Association, the American Catholic Historical Association, the Conference on British Studies, the Modern Language Association of America, the executive board of the U.S. Catholic Historical Society, the Historical Association (England), and the Long Island British Studies Group. He was listed as a member of the Society for the Christian Commonwealth's "Christian Commentary Lecture Bureau," which was advertised in Triumph magazine, all of which were founded by L. Brent Bozell Jr. He contributed book reviews to the Catholic Historical Review. Among the doctoral students he supervised at St. John's were Anthony M. Brescia, who taught at Nassau Community College, and Catherine Papadakos.
