= Ross J. S. Hoffman =

American historian

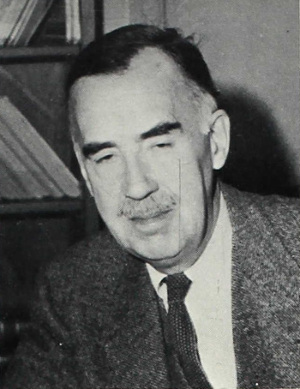
- Born: February 2, 1902; Harrisburg, PA, US
- Died: December 16, 1979 (aged 77); Rye, NY, US
- Occupation: Historian
- Writing career
- Period: 1933 - 1973
- Subjects: European History, American History, International Affairs

Ross John Swartz Hoffman (February 2, 1902 - December 16, 1979) was an American historian, writer, educator, and conservative intellectual who specialized in Modern European History and International Affairs.

== Life and career ==
Born on February 2, 1902, in Harrisburg, Pennsylvania, Hoffman attended Lafayette College (A.B., 1923) and the University of Pennsylvania (M.A., 1926; Ph.D., 1932). His doctoral dissertation ("Great Britain and the German Trade Rivalry, 1875-1914"), prepared under the supervision of William Ezra Lingelbach, was published by the University of Pennsylvania Press in 1933 and received the George Louis Beer Prize from the American Historical Association in 1934.

Hoffman began his teaching career at New York University, where he was an Instructor (1926–1933) and then assistant professor of history (1933–1938). Hoffman had initially rejected the Protestant Christianity that he was raised in by his parents, who were of German descent, and was instead attracted to Socialism. However, the study of history, as well as traveling throughout Europe, observing world events in the 1920s, and a thorough reading of scripture led him he to convert to Roman Catholicism in 1931. He described his conversion in his book, Restoration (Sheed, 1934). In the introduction that he contributed to Peter Guilday (ed.), The Catholic Philosophy of History (P. J. Kenedy, 1936), Hoffman noted (page ix) that, "Strictly speaking, the Catholic faith is not the philosophy of history, but it gives light to see the meaning of history; it does not reveal or explain the whole structure of the process, but it does point the direction and the end. Without this light man is blind and the historical process, in the last analysis, is an impenetrable mystery; with it, man may see a little way at least into the reason that lies hidden."

When the Rev. Robert I. Gannon, President of Fordham University, a Jesuit institution, approached Hoffman about joining the History faculty at Fordham, he agreed. At Fordham, he began as an Associate Professor (1938–1944) and then Professor of History (1944–1967). He was made professor emeritus in 1967.

Hoffman was married to Hannah Elizabeth McCruden (1926), and they had one child.

== Scholarship ==
Hoffman published articles and books on both current and historical events, and contributed to a short-lived conservative journal, The American Review. He condemned Fascism in the 1920s and 30s, and then Communism in the 1950s and 60s. Unlike his Fordham colleague Charles C. Tansill, who was an isolationist and who argued against American involvement in the Second World War, Hoffman argued for American intervention on conservative and Christian grounds.

Several of Hoffman's books dealt with world events: The Will to Freedom (Sheed, 1935); Tradition and Progress, and Other Historical Essays in Culture, Religion, and Politics (Bruce Books, 1938); The Organic State: An Historical View of Contemporary Politics (Sheed, 1939); The Great Republic: A Historical View of the International Community and the Organization of Peace (Sheed, 1942); (with C. G. Haines) Origins and Background of the Second World War (Oxford University Press, 1943; 2nd edition, 1947); Durable Peace: A Study in American National Policy (Oxford University Press, 1944); and The Spirit of Politics and the Future of Freedom (Bruce Books, 1951). He also co-authored (with Gaetano L. Vincitorio and Morrison V. Swift) a textbook, Man and His History: World History and Western Civilization (Doubleday, 1958; revised ed., 1963).

Hoffman is often cited as helping to revive American academic interest in Edmund Burke, and published two books on the British statesman: (with A. Paul Levack) Burke's Politics: Selected Writings and Speeches on Reform, Revolution, and War (Knopf, 1949); and Edmund Burke, New York Agent, with His Letters to the New York Assembly and Intimate Correspondence with Charles O'Hara, 1761-1776 (American Philosophical Society, 1956). He also contributed to Peter J. Stanlis (ed.) The Relevance of Edmund Burke (P. J. Kenedy, 1964).

Hoffman's final book was The Marquis: A Study of Lord Rockingham, 1730-1782 (Fordham University Press, 1973). He was the recipient of a Festschrift from former students and other admirers, Crisis in the "Great Republic": Essays Presented to Ross J. S. Hoffman, edited by Gaetano L. Vincitorio and James E. Bunce et al. (Fordham University Press, 1969).

Historian John P. McCarthy credits Hoffman with two significant contributions to the American conservative movement, writing that "he worked to broaden it from an essentially non-conservative emphasis on American uniqueness ... [and] helped conservatives identify the American constitutional heritage with an older tradition of limitations on government dating back through medieval times," as well as leaving "a deep impression on many first generation American graduate students about the depth of their Catholic and European heritage."

Hoffman was the recipient of honorary degrees from Villanova College (D.Litt., 1936); Marquette University (LL.D., 1937); Fordham University (LL.D., 1947); St. John's University (LL.D., 1970); University of Detroit (L.H.D., 1950); and the National University of Ireland (Litt.D., 1957). He was President of the American Catholic Historical Association during 1938–1939, and received the King Award from U.S. Catholic Historical Society in 1975.
