= National Humanities Institute =

American conservative think tank (1984-)

- Abbreviation: NHI
- Established: 1984 (42 years ago)
- Types: think tank, publisher
- Legal status: nonprofit corporation
- Headquarters: Bowie
- Country: United States
- Revenue: 45,084 United States dollar (2016)
- Total Assets: 89,199 United States dollar (2016)
- Website: www.nhinet.org

The National Humanities Institute is a nonprofit interdisciplinary educational organization founded in 1984 by Claes G. Ryn. It is known to be affiliated with traditionalist conservatism.

== Programs and publications ==
The institute publishes Humanitas (journal) and the Epistulae Occasional Papers.

The National Humanities Institute operates the Irving Babbitt Project and the Center for Constitutional Studies.

== Leadership ==
Claes G. Ryn is the institute's chairman and Joseph Baldacchino serves as the institute's president.

Robert F. Ellsworth and Anthony Harrigan serve on its board of trustees.

Members of the academic board include: George W. Carey, Jude P. Dougherty, David C. Jordan, Ralph Ketcham, Forrest McDonald, Walter A. McDougall, Jacob Neusner, James Seaton, Peter J. Stanlis, and Michael A. Weinstein.
