= Humanitas (journal) =

- Discipline: Political science, Philosophy, education
- Language: English
- Edited by: Luke C. Sheahan

Publication details
- History: 1987-present
- Publisher: The Academy of Philosophy & Letters (United States)
- Frequency: Semiannual

Standard abbreviations
- ISO 4: Humanitas

Indexing
- ISSN: 1066-7210 (print); 2993-2378 (web)
- LCCN: 94-648029
- OCLC no.: 27033387

Links
- Journal homepage; Online access

Humanitas is an interdisciplinary journal published by The Academy of Philosophy & Letters. It is known for its affiliation with traditionalist conservatism.

The journal seeks to foster among its readers and contributors a spirit of open inquiry, a willingness to subject cherished doctrines to challenge and look beyond conventional categories of thought. Humanitas explores issues of moral and social philosophy, epistemology, and aesthetics, and the relations among them, such as the moral and cultural conditions of knowledge. Favorable to an historical understanding of life, Humanitas explores the tension and union between universality and particularity, and the interdependence and opposition of creativity and tradition. Fruitful new thinking will resist reductionism and will, for example, distinguish between contrasting strains within modernity and postmodernity.

Joseph Baldacchino and Claes G. Ryn were the founding editors of this journal in 1987. Originally published by the National Humanities Institute, Humanitas was subsequently published by the Center for the Study of Statesmanship at the Catholic University of America. The Academy of Philosophy and Letters now publishes the journal with the assistance of the Philosophy Documentation Center. The current editor is Luke C. Sheahan.

== Indexing ==
Humanitas is abstracted and indexed in Academic OneFile, Academic Search Premier, Philosopher's Index, PhilPapers, and ProQuest Research Library.
