= Claes G. Ryn =

American political philosopher (born 1943)

Claes Gösta Ryn (born 12 June 1943) is a Swedish-born American conservative academic and educator.

== Background ==
Ryn was born and raised in Norrköping in Sweden. He attended the Latin Gymnasium, Norrköpings Högre Allmänna Läroverk' (1959–63). He did military service in the Royal Life Company at the I 4 Regiment in Linkoping and the Signal Corps at the S 1 Regiment in Uppsala. He was an undergraduate and a doctoral student at Uppsala University. He did further doctoral study at Louisiana State University, Baton Rouge, United States, (Ph.D. 1974).

== Career ==
He is a former professor of politics at Catholic University of America (CUA), where he was also chairman of his department for six years. He taught also at the University of Virginia and Georgetown University. He was co-founder and chairperson of the National Humanities Institute and editor of its academic journal Humanitas. He was co-founder and the first president of the Academy of Philosophy and Letters. He is a past president of the Philadelphia Society (2001 to 2002). He is the founder and former director of the Center for the Study of Statesmanship at CUA. He became an advisor to the Nobel Committee of the Swedish Academy on the Nobel Prize in Literature in 1990.

== Political philosopher ==
Ryn's fields of teaching and research include ethics and politics; epistemology; historicism; politics and culture; the history of Western political thought; conservatism; the theory of constitutionalism and democracy; Jean-Jacques Rousseau; Irving Babbitt; Benedetto Croce.

He has written much on ethics and politics and on the central role of culture, specifically, the imagination, in shaping politics and society. He has sought to reconstitute the epistemology of the humanities and social sciences, paying close attention to the interaction of will, imagination and reason. He has criticized abstract, ahistorical conceptions of rationality as inadequate to the study of distinctively human life and to the study of real universality. He has argued that there is a much different, experientially grounded form of rationality, the reason of philosophy proper, that is capable of at once humble and penetrating observation. He has developed a philosophy known as value-centered historicism, which demonstrates the potential union of universality and historical particularity. In political theory he has been a sharp critic of Straussian anti-historical thinking and neoconservatism. He has argued that in essential ways neoconservatism resembles the ideology of the French Jacobins and is neo-Jacobin.

Ryn's discussion of democracy emphasizes that popular government can assume radically different forms, only some of which are compatible with a higher, ethical striving. Theories of what he calls plebiscitary democracy assume romantic and utopian notions of human nature and society. Constitutional democracy is based on a more realistic view of man and is more consonant with the actual moral terms of human existence. This form of government has demanding moral and cultural preconditions and is endangered wherever those preconditions are not satisfied.

Ryn has developed a philosophy of civilization and international relations that emphasizes the moral and cultural preconditions of good relations among persons, peoples, and civilizations. He argues that diversity need not be a source of strife but can even foster mutually enriching interactions, provided that persons, peoples, and civilizations let their distinctiveness be informed by sensitivity to what is highest in each. The way to avoid conflict is not for persons and societies to shed all traits that make them different from others and adopt a homogenous uni-culture, but for each to cultivate the best that it has to offer. In this manner universality and particularity can not merely co-exist, but enter into an enriching dynamic. They can, each in their own way, contribute to an evolving common human ground in which universality and particularity are brought together.

== Relevance of Value-Centered Historicism for Politics and World Affairs ==
The Issue - Ryn argues that the ultimate goal of philosophy is to aid practical action, and he has applied his ‘Value-Centered Historicism’ to a wide range of practical issues. Although Ryn is practically the opposite of a communist, many prominent Chinese intellectuals have reacted very favourably to his thinking. Ryn argues that certain powerful historical developments will sooner or later force the United States to abandon once and for all the neoconservative desire for global domination. Need for Philosophical Foundations - Even more than in other fields, international relations require in-depth reflection on topics that most people consider irrelevant or too “philosophical”. Instead, we need to know and understand how the philosophies of the Enlightenment, Romanticism and Positivism ignored a point considered central by ancient civilisations: the perennial tension within human beings between higher and lower moral motivations. Between the potential for noble, rather than selfish, behaviour on the one hand, and malicious and destructive self-indulgence on the other. The spread of modern and post-modern Western culture throughout the world creates a sort of global commonality, but this culture (atheistic, secular, materialistic, progressive, anti-traditionalist, genderless, anti-meritocratic) is in many ways contemptuous of humanity's ancient moral and cultural traditions. In ancient Greek philosophy, as in medieval Christianity, the most serious sin was pride. We must not devote ourselves to correcting the faults of others, but first and foremost we must strive to correct our own. The modern thinker who most profoundly challenged this view of the human condition was Jean-Jacques Rousseau (1712-1778). Rousseau inspired the Jacobins, whose ideas dominated the French Revolution, and whose personalities and deeds were the models of the Bolshevik revolutionaries in 1917 Russia. Rousseau firmly rejected the old conception that human beings are forever divided between good and evil. In the very nature of humans there is not any tendency for evil. Humanity in its pre-social, “natural” state was morally good. Its life was simple and primitive and, precisely because of this, it was happy and peaceful. What causes evil in existing societies are the institutions and the norms of civilisation, which are entirely perverse because they are artificial, that is non-natural. Humanity's natural goodness can be restored only by destroying the historical achievements and traditions of society. These ideas had an enormous impact in the West. Virtue was understood as a feeling and as something centred on “compassion”. Outcomes in Popular Culture - The emergence of this new romantic idea of morality in the Western world coincided with the spread of Enlightenment rationalism. The latter promoted the idea that abstract rationality was the distinctive feature and appropriate guide for humanity. The Enlightenment thinkers and the irrational and sentimental Romantics had differences between them, but they shared the idea that there was no congenital sinful ego in human beings that required inner vigilance and intimate moral self-criticism. The key to remedying social ills – and both groups agreed on this! – was instead a fundamental reconstruction of society, a sort of social engineering. An abstract, timeless and dreamlike vision defined the objectives, while an apparently rational manipulation provided the method for reforming society, in an equal and mandatory manner for all peoples. Critical Assessment - But all peoples always display their own specific immoral characteristics. On the other hand, all peoples have traits and achievements of which they can be proud. Asking a people to abandon what has made them what they are and insisting on a supposedly unique superior culture means depriving them of a source of identity and self-esteem. A people cannot truly correct their moral and intellectual ills unless they rely on both their strengths and their awareness of their specific moral vices. Common ground is not a model, an immutable set of ahistorical “principles”. Unpredictable higher unity finds expression only in different circumstances. What is needed, therefore, is a synthesis of universality and particularity that contrasts sharply with universality understood as a static and purely abstract and static norm, which can be both detailed and predicted. Abstract rationalists (in the US, the Neocons) admit that human beings are sometimes less than rational. The remedy, they think, is to be more rational. Sentimental romantics (in the US, the liberal Democrats) simply deny the underlying problem. Both abstract rationalists and sentimental dreamers ignore or underestimate the deeper problem: human beings are often strongly inclined towards behaviours – arrogance, partisanship, ruthlessness, laziness, greed, desire to dominate others, and so on – that block dialogue and produce wars. The new Jacobins, emphasise that the so-called “basic principles” of the USA are the same as those of all humanity and therefore American armed global hegemony is necessary, which means that they favour an unleashing of American power. Leo Strauss and his followers have long attacked “Historicism” of various kinds in the name of what they call “Natural Law”. And in the name of this “Natural Law”, both the Neocons and the Democrats converge on a warmongering foreign policy. Viable solutions - The only way to counter this is to get used to controlling one's impulses and examining one's conscience, which people will only be inclined to do thanks to their previous moral, spiritual and cultural education, i.e. thanks to their knowledge of their own history. A people should retrace its history to become aware of its ideological and political ills, just as an individual can undergo psychoanalysis to identify their mental and psychological illnesses. While the acceptance in the West of certain desires and behaviours (which many people today call “woke”) will tend to antagonise rather than bring closer representatives of more traditional cultures such as Russia, China and India. The rescue of World Higher Traditions – instead – will provide them and the West with a common human ground.

== Influence in China ==
In 2000 he gave the Distinguished Foreign Scholar Lectures at Beijing University, which also published this lecture series in Chinese translation as a book, Unity Through Diversity (2001). He has lectured and published widely in China. In 2007 he gave a keynote address at the Chinese Academy of Social Science in Beijing. The Chinese edition (2007) of his book America the Virtuous became one of the most hotly discussed in China. Dushu, “probably China’s leading intellectual journal of the past decade”, described it as "the kind of classical work that will be read over the generations." Three of his books and many of his articles have appeared in Chinese translation in China.

In 2012 Beijing Normal University named Ryn Honorary Professor.

== Students ==
Notable students he has mentored include:

- W. Wesley McDonald, Elizabethtown College, author of the definitive intellectual study of Russell Kirk, Russell Kirk and the Age of Ideology
- Edward Hudgins, who has worked in think tanks including the Heritage Foundation, the Cato Institute, and The Atlas Society.

== Selected bibliography ==
- A Common Human Ground: Universality and Particularity in a Multicultural World, Columbia and London: University of Missouri Press, 2003.
- A Desperate Man (Washington, D.C.: Athena Books, 2014; 2013)
- The Failure of American Conservatism and the Road not Taken (New York, N.Y: Republic Book Publishers, 2023)
- America the Virtuous: The Crisis of Democracy and the Quest for Empire (2003)
- The New Jacobinism (1991; exp.ed. 2011)
- Unity Through Diversity: on Cultivating Humanity’s Highest Ground, in Chinese translation, Beijing: Peking University Press, 2001.
- Will, Imagination and Reason: Babbitt, Croce and the Problem of Reality, Second expanded edition with a Major New Introduction by the Author. New Brunswick and London: Transaction Publishers, 1997.
- Democracy and the Ethical Life: A Philosophy of Politics and Community (1978, exp. ed. 1990)
- A Common Human Ground: Universality and Particularity in a Multicultural World (2003, exp. ed. 2019)
