= Borisz de Balla =

American historian (1903–1992)

Borisz de Balla (August 19, 1903 – February 16, 1992), also known as Borisz Balla de Iregh, was a Hungarian journalist, historian, diplomat, novelist, and educator who taught in the United States after World War II.

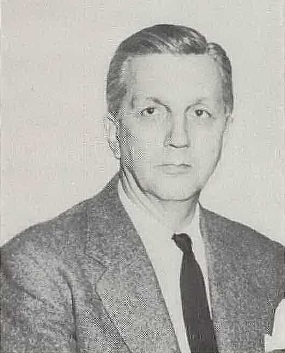
Dr. Borisz de Balla, circa 1956

Born on August 19, 1903, in Petervarad, Hungary (today in Serbia) de Balla attended the University of Pécs, where he received the B.A. (1924) and Ph.D. (1938), as well as Eötvös Loránd University, where he received an M.A. (1932). His older brother, Valentine de Balla, was a political scientist at Loyola College in Maryland. His parents were Aladar de Balla and Dora Paul de Balla. Aladar was a former Minister of the Interior, member of parliament, and diplomat, serving as the Hungarian ambassador in Zagreb.

De Balla was active in Hungarian Catholic circles, and served as an editor, co-editor, or contributor for several Hungarian Catholic periodicals, including Korunk Szava (Voice of Our Age, editor from 1931 to 1935), Új Kor (New Era), Jelenkor (Our Age), Nemzeti Újság (National News), and Vigilia (Vigil, editor-in-chief from 1935 to 1938). He entered the Hungarian Foreign Service in the summer of 1939, and served as cultural and press attaché in Brussels and Madrid; as Secretary of Legation in Berne; and then as Hungarian Consul in Paris. He left the diplomatic service in 1946 and remained in Paris for a year, before emigrating to the United States with his wife, the Baroness Melanie de Schwaben-Durneiss.

In America, de Balla taught history at Loyola College in Maryland from 1947 to 1948, where he was referred to as "the leading Hungarian Catholic novelist." He then taught at Le Moyne College, a Jesuit college in Syracuse, New York, from 1948 to 1958, before joining the graduate History faculty at St. John's University in 1958, where he specialized in teaching intellectual history and the philosophy of history. Among the doctoral students he supervised at St. John's were Francis E. Fenner, who taught at St. Joseph's College; the Rev. Charles B. Cushing, who was Pastor of Corpus Christi Catholic Church in Woodside, New York; John B. Starkey, who taught at Daemen College; Gerard K. Burke, who taught at the College of White Plains; Franklin J. McNiff; the Rev. Joseph J. Symes, C.M., who taught at St. John's; and Thomas Laszlo Szendrey, who taught at Gannon University, and whose 1972 doctoral dissertation was on "The Ideological and Methodological Foundations of Hungarian Historiography, 1750-1970." St. John's had a mandatory retirement policy at the time that forced employees to retire at age 65, including basketball coach Joe Lapchick. If some faculty were still in good health and were still important to and needed by their department, they could still receive annual renewals that would have to be approved up the administrative chain of command. That enabled de Balla to continue teaching past the retirement age for a total of fifteen years at St. John's, retiring in 1973, and he was then named Professor Emeritus.

He was the author of "A lélek útjai Nyugaton" (1934); "A megsebzett" (1938); "Niczky növendék" (1939); "Brüsszeli napló: 1939-1940" (1940); "Der Verwundete" (1947); "Niké naplója" (1959); and "Traditionalist Warnings and the Limits of Progress in History" (1967). De Balla contributed essays to "Commonweal", "Catholic World", "Thought Patterns", "University Bookman", "Cross and Crown", and to a collected work by St. John's history faculty (Studies in Modern History). He was listed as a member of the Society for the Christian Commonwealth's "Christian Commentary Lecture Bureau," which was advertised in Triumph magazine, all of which were founded by L. Brent Bozell Jr. There is a photograph of de Balla on the "History of Vigilia" website.
