= Russell Kirk bibliography =

This is a list of works by American writer Russell Kirk.

== Fiction ==
This is a complete list of fictional works by Russell Kirk. These comprise only a small portion of Kirk's published writings.

See the "Fiction" subsection of the article on Kirk for a descriptive overview of his fiction.

=== Novels ===
Kirk wrote three book-length novels. Two of them underwent a revised edition. Listed below, by sequence of publication, are both the original texts and the revisions, with some bibliographic notes.

==== Old House of Fear ====
- Old House of Fear, original text (New York, NY: Fleet Publishing Corporation, 1961):
  - Pre-ISBN
  - Hardback, 256 pp.
  - Reprinted later in paperback by several other publishers
    - Remains to the present as a reprint by one publisher:
      - Grand Rapids, MI: Wm. B. Eerdmans Publishing Company, 2007:
        - LCCN 2006-103519
        - Trade paperback, 194 pp.
        - This is the only book-length edition of Kirk's fiction to remain in print
        - The author's dedication in all previous editions is omitted by this publisher
        - None of the changes made in the revised edition (noted below) are included
- Old House of Fear, revised text (New York, NY: Fleet Publishing Corporation, 1965):
  - Pre-ISBN
  - Hardback, 256 pp.
  - Never reprinted by any other publisher
  - This text differs from the original in these respects:
    - A descriptive title has been added to each numbered chapter heading
    - A line consisting of "The End" has been added at the novel's closing

==== A Creature of the Twilight ====
- A Creature of the Twilight: His Memorials (New York, NY: Fleet Publishing Corporation, 1966):
  - Pre-ISBN
  - Hardback, 320 pp.
  - Never reprinted by any other publisher

==== Lord of the Hollow Dark ====
- Lord of the Hollow Dark, original text (New York, NY: St. Martin's Press, 1979):
  - ISBN 0-312-49844-6
  - Hardback, x + 336 pp.
  - Never reprinted by any other publisher
- Lord of the Hollow Dark, revised text (Front Royal, VA: Christendom Press, 1989):
  - ISBN 0-931888-35-2
  - Trade paperback, 384 pp.
  - Never reprinted by any other publisher
  - This text differs from the original in these respects:
    - Kirk's 1967 short story "Balgrummo's Hell" is added as a prologue (under the heading "Prolegomenon: Balgrummo's Hell") to the rest of the novel
    - An "Acknowledgements" section, written respecting this revised edition, is added following the novel's text

=== Short stories ===
==== Individual stories ====
Each of Kirk's 22 stories—along with variant titles—are listed below alphabetically, with first-printing citations and supplementary notes.

- "Balgrummo's Hell"
  - The Magazine of Fantasy and Science Fiction, 7/1967
  - Later added by Kirk as prologue to the 1989 revised edition of his novel Lord of the Hollow Dark
- "Behind the Stumps"
  - The London Mystery Magazine #4 (6/1950–7/1950)
  - Kirk's first published work of fiction
- "The Cellar of Little Egypt"
  - Kirk, Russell, The Surly Sullen Bell, New York, NY: Fleet Publishing Corporation, 1962 (pre-ISBN)
- "An Encounter by Mortstone Pond"
  - Kirk, Russell, Watchers at the Strait Gate, Sauk City, WI: Arkham House Publishers, 1984, ISBN 0-87054-098-X
- "Ex Tenebris"
  - Queen's Quarterly #64 (Summer/1957)
- "Fate's Purse"
  - The Magazine of Fantasy and Science Fiction, 5/1979
- "The Invasion of the Church of the Holy Ghost"
  - Kirk, Russell, Watchers at the Strait Gate, Sauk City, WI: Arkham House Publishers, 1984, ISBN 0-87054-098-X
- "The Last God's Dream"
  - Kirk, Russell, The Princess of All Lands, Sauk City, WI: Arkham House Publishers, 1979, ISBN 0-87054-084-X
- "Lex Talionis"
  - Schiff, Stuart (editor), Whispers II, Garden City, NY: Doubleday, 1979, ISBN 0-385-14967-0
- "Lost Lake"
  - Southwest Review #42 (Autumn/1957)
- "Off the Sand Road"
  - World Review #37 (3/1952)
- "Old Place of Sorworth"
  - The London Mystery Magazine #14 (2/1952–3/1952)
  - Called "Sorworth Place" in reprints, including in Kirk's 1962 story collection The Surly Sullen Bell and 1979 story collection The Princess of All Lands, its only appearances editorially overseen by Kirk himself:
    - The title change might have been motivated by the original's similarity to that of Kirk's 1961 novel Old House of Fear
- "The Peculiar Demesne"
  - McCauley, Kirby (editor), Dark Forces: New Stories of Suspense and Supernatural Horror, New York, NY: Viking Press, 1980, ISBN 0-670-25653-6
  - Called "The Peculiar Demesne of Archvicar Gerontion" in reprints, including in Kirk's 1984 story collection Watchers at the Strait Gate, its only appearance editorially overseen by Kirk himself
- "The Peculiar Demesne of Archvicar Gerontion"
  - Reprint name of 1980 story "The Peculiar Demesne", including in Kirk's 1984 story collection Watchers at the Strait Gate, its only appearance editorially overseen by Kirk himself
- "The Princess of All Lands"
  - Kirk, Russell, The Princess of All Lands, Sauk City, WI: Arkham House Publishers, 1979, ISBN 0-87054-084-X
- "The Reflex-Man in Whinnymuir Close"
  - Kirk, Russell, Watchers at the Strait Gate, Sauk City, WI: Arkham House Publishers, 1984, ISBN 0-87054-098-X
- "Saviourgate"
  - The Magazine of Fantasy and Science Fiction, Volume 51 #5 (11/1976)
- "Skyberia"
  - Queen's Quarterly #59 (Summer/1952)
- "Sorworth Place"
  - Reprint name of 1952 story "Old Place of Sorworth", including in Kirk's 1962 story collection The Surly Sullen Bell and 1979 story collection The Princess of All Lands, its only appearances editorially overseen by Kirk himself:
    - The title change might have been motivated by the original's similarity to that of Kirk's 1961 novel Old House of Fear
- "The Surly Sullen Bell"
  - The London Mystery Magazine #7 (12/1950–1/1951)
- "There's a Long, Long Trail A-Winding"
  - McCauley, Kirby (editor), Frights: New Stories of Suspense and Supernatural Terror, New York, NY: St. Martin's Press, 1976, ISBN 0-312-30625-3
  - Winner, 1977 World Fantasy Award for Best Short Fiction
  - Published under the slightly different title "There's a Long, Long Trail a-Winding" in Kirk's 1979 story collection The Princess of All Lands, its only appearance editorially overseen by Kirk himself:
    - Kirk also names the story that way in his preface to that collection
- "There's a Long, Long Trail a-Winding"
  - Slightly different reprint name of "There's a Long, Long Trail A-Winding" in Kirk's 1979 story collection The Princess of All Lands, its only appearance editorially overseen by Kirk himself:
    - Kirk also names the story this way in his preface to that collection
- "Uncle Isaiah"
  - The London Mystery Magazine #10 (8/1951–9/1951)
- "Watchers at the Strait Gate"
  - Campbell, Ramsey (editor), New Terrors, London: Pan Books, 1980, ISBN 0-330-26126-6
- "What Shadows We Pursue"
  - The Magazine of Fantasy and Science Fiction, 1/1953

==== Story collections ====
Listed below, by sequence of publication, are the six different books which feature Kirk's own stories exclusively, with contents and some notes. (Not listed here are the multi-author anthologies in which many of his stories first appeared or were reprinted.)

===== Author-overseen collections =====
These three collections were published with Kirk's active involvement and include all his stories. (Six of the stories here appear in two of the books.)

- The Surly Sullen Bell: Ten stories and sketches, uncanny or uncomfortable. With a note on the ghostly tale. (New York, NY: Fleet Publishing Corporation, 1962):
  - Pre-ISBN
  - Hardback, 240 pp.
  - Reprinted later in paperback by other publishers
  - Illustrated by the author (uncredited)
  - Contents:
    - Preface ("Foreword")
    - Ten stories:
      - "Uncle Isaiah"
      - "Off the Sand Road"
      - "Ex Tenebris"
      - "The Surly Sullen Bell"
      - "The Cellar of Little Egypt"
      - "Skyberia"
      - "Sorworth Place"
      - "Behind the Stumps"
      - "What Shadows We Pursue"
      - "Lost Lake"
    - Afterword ("A Cautionary Note on the Ghostly Tale"):
      - Reprinted from The Critic, Volume 20 #5 (4/1962–5/1962)
- The Princess of All Lands (Sauk City, WI: Arkham House Publishers, 1979):
  - ISBN 0-87054-084-X
  - Hardback, x + 238 pp.
  - A single, limited edition
  - Illustrated by Joe Wehrle Jr.
  - Contents:
    - Preface ("Prologue")
    - Nine stories:
      - "Sorworth Place"
      - "Behind the Stumps"
      - "The Princess of All Lands"
      - "The Last God's Dream"
      - "The Cellar of Little Egypt"
      - "Ex Tenebris"
      - "Balgrummo's Hell"
      - "There's a Long, Long Trail a-Winding"
      - "Saviourgate"
- Watchers at the Strait Gate (Sauk City, WI: Arkham House Publishers, 1984):
  - ISBN 0-87054-098-X
  - Hardback, xiv + 258 pp.
  - A single, limited edition
  - Illustrated by Andrew Smith
  - Contents:
    - Preface ("A Cautionary Note on the Ghostly Tale"):
      - Specially written for this collection
      - This is not the essay of the same name printed as an afterword in Kirk's 1962 story collection The Surly Sullen Bell
    - Ten stories:
      - "The Invasion of the Church of the Holy Ghost"
      - "The Surly Sullen Bell"
      - "The Peculiar Demesne of Archvicar Gerontion"
      - "Uncle Isaiah"
      - "The Reflex-Man in Whinnymuir Close"
      - "What Shadows We Pursue"
      - "Lex Talionis"
      - "Fate's Purse"
      - "An Encounter by Mortstone Pond"
      - "Watchers at the Strait Gate"

===== Posthumous collections =====
These last three collections were prepared, by their respective editors and publishers, years after Kirk's death. The first two are uniform editions which, taken together, systematically collect all Kirk's stories. The third book gathers all but three of his stories in a single volume.

- Off the Sand Road: Ghost Stories, Volume One (Ashcroft, BC: Ash-Tree Press, 2002):
  - ISBN 1-55310-043-3
  - Hardback, xviii + 206 pp.
  - A single, limited edition
  - Published in Canada, Kirk's texts here have been edited to conform with Canadian spelling and punctuation
  - Edited by John Pelan
  - Illustrated by Russell Kirk (adapted from his 1962 collection, The Surly Sullen Bell)
  - Contents:
    - Foreword by the editor ("Introduction: The Ghosts of Piety Hill")
    - Eleven stories:
      - "The Surly Sullen Bell"
      - "Behind the Stumps"
      - "Sorworth Place"
      - "Balgrummo's Hell"
      - "There's a Long, Long Trail A-Winding"
      - "Saviourgate"
      - "Off the Sand Road"
      - "Fate's Purse":
        - A passage of this story is omitted here due to production error
        - That omission was later remedied in the subsequent companion volume by its reprinting the story in its entirety as an appendix
      - "The Princess of All Lands"
      - "An Encounter by Mortstone Pond"
      - "Lex Talionis"
    - Afterword by Russell Kirk ("A Cautionary Note on the Ghostly Tale"):
      - Reprinted from the preface with the same title in his 1984 story collection Watchers at the Strait Gate
      - This is not the essay of the same name reprinted as an afterword in Kirk's 1962 story collection The Surly Sullen Bell
- What Shadows We Pursue: Ghost Stories, Volume Two (Ashcroft, BC: Ash-Tree Press, 2003):
  - ISBN 1-55310-051-4
  - Hardback, xiv + 254 pp.
  - A single, limited edition
  - Published in Canada, Kirk's texts here have been edited to conform with Canadian spelling and punctuation
  - Edited by John Pelan
  - Illustrated by Russell Kirk (adapted from his 1962 collection, The Surly Sullen Bell)
  - Contents:
    - Foreword by the editor ("Introduction: The Wizard of Mecosta")
    - Twelve stories:
      - "The Invasion of the Church of the Holy Ghost"
      - "What Shadows We Pursue"
      - "The Peculiar Demesne of Archvicar Gerontion"
      - "Uncle Isaiah"
      - "The Reflex-Man in Whinnymuir Close"
      - "The Cellar of Little Egypt"
      - "Skyberia"
      - "Lost Lake"
      - "The Last God's Dream"
      - "Ex Tenebris"
      - "Watchers at the Strait Gate"
      - "Fate's Purse"
        - Corrected reprinting of the entire story misprinted in the earlier companion volume
        - Placed here as an appendix
- Ancestral Shadows: An Anthology of Ghostly Tales (Grand Rapids, MI: Wm. B. Eerdmans Publishing Company, 2004):
  - ISBN 0-8028-3938-X:
  - Hardback, xviii + 406 pp.
  - Contains 19 of Kirk's 22 stories (those not included being "Off the Sand Road", "Lost Lake" and "Skyberia")
  - Despite its U.S. publisher, the texts here have been editorially adapted to conform with Canadian spelling and punctuation:
    - These texts were drawn from Canadian publisher Ash-Tree Press's two-volume Ghost Stories (noted above) by Kirk
  - Edited by Vigen Guroian
  - Contents:
    - Foreword by the editor ("Introduction")
    - Nineteen stories:
      - "Ex Tenebris"
      - "Behind the Stumps"
      - "Uncle Isaiah"
      - "The Surly Sullen Bell"
      - "Balgrummo's Hell"
      - "Lex Talionis"
      - "What Shadows We Pursue"
      - "The Cellar of Little Egypt"
      - "Fate's Purse"
      - "The Princess of All Lands"
      - "Sorworth Place"
      - "Saviourgate"
      - "The Last God's Dream"
      - "The Peculiar Demesne of Archvicar Gerontion"
      - "There's a Long, Long Trail A-Winding"
      - "Watchers at the Strait Gate"
      - "The Reflex-Man in Whinnymuir Close"
      - "The Invasion of the Church of the Holy Ghost"
      - "An Encounter at Mortstone Pond"
    - Afterword by Russell Kirk ("A Cautionary Note on the Ghostly Tale"):
      - From the preface of the same title in his 1984 story collection Watchers at the Strait Gate
      - This is not the essay of the same name reprinted in his 1962 story collection The Surly Sullen Bell

== Nonfiction ==
- John Randolph of Roanoke: A Study in American Politics (1951)
- The Conservative Mind, originally subtitled "From Burke to Santayana" and later editions "From Burke to Eliot" (1953)
- A Program for Conservatives (1954)
- St. Andrews (1954)
- Academic Freedom: An Essay in Definition (1955)
- Beyond the Dreams of Avarice: Essays of a Social Critic (1956)
- The American Cause (1957)
- The Library of Conservative Thought 30 Vols. (edited, 1963–1993)
- Confessions of a Bohemian Tory (1963)
- The Political Principles of Robert A. Taft, with James McClellan (1967)
- Edmund Burke: A Genius Reconsidered (1967)
- Enemies of the Permanent Things: Observations of Abnormity in Literature and Politics (1969)
- Eliot and His Age: T. S. Eliot's Moral Imagination in the Twentieth Century (1971)
- The Roots of American Order (1974)
- Decadence and Renewal in the Higher Learning (1978)
- Libertarians: the Chirping Sectaries (1981)
- The Portable Conservative Reader (1982)
- The Wise Men Know What Wicked Things Are Written on the Sky (1987)
- Economics: Work and Prosperity (1989)
- America's British Culture (1993)
- The Politics of Prudence (1993)
- The Sword of Imagination: Memoirs of a Half-Century of Literary Conflict (1995)
- Redeeming the Time (1996)
- Rights and Duties: Reflections on Our Conservative Constitution (1997)
- The Essential Russell Kirk (2007)
