= The Imaginative Conservative =

Conservative online journal

- Editor: Bradley J. Birzer; Stephen M. Klugewicz
- Categories: Editorial journal
- Publisher: W. Winston Elliott III
- Founder: Bradley J. Birzer
- First issue: June 2010
- Country: United States
- Based in: Houston, Texas, U.S.
- Language: English
- Website: theimaginativeconservative.org

The Imaginative Conservative (TIC) is an American online conservative journal, founded in 2010.

== History ==
The co-founders of TIC were Bradley J. Birzer, the holder of the Russell Amos Kirk chair in American Studies at Hillsdale College, and W. Winston Elliott III, President of the Free Enterprise Institute and a visiting professor in Liberal Arts at Houston Baptist University.

Conceived early in 2010 and launched in June of that year, TIC was initially dedicated to promoting conservatism in general and the ideas of Russell Kirk in particular. In its first year it published an article by Steve Masty, a veteran of the Afghanistan conflict, which was deeply critical of American policy and intentions there.

In 2015, TIC republished Russell Kirk's book Prospects for Conservatives, with an introduction by Bradley J. Birzer which called the work a "Christian humanistic manifesto". Also in 2015, the journal published a list of suggested gifts for conservatives, which included badger-hair shaving brushes and Evelyn Waugh's novel Brideshead Revisited.

As of 2021, the journal said of itself that its purpose was to address culture, liberal learning, politics, political economy, literature, the arts, and the American Republic, in the tradition of Kirk, Irving Babbitt, M. E. Bradford, Edmund Burke, Willa Cather, Christopher Dawson, T. S. Eliot, Paul Elmer More, Robert Nisbet, Wilhelm Roepke, Eric Voegelin, Richard M. Weaver, and other "leaders of Imaginative Conservatism".

== Contributors ==
Notable contributors to The Imaginative Conservative have included

- Michael Bauman
- Stratford Caldecott
- Bruce Frohnen
- Ross M. Lence
- Benjamin Myers
- Joseph Pearce
- Derek Turner
- Gleaves Whitney

== See also ==
- Classical liberalism
- Conservatism in the United States
- List of United States magazines
- Traditionalist conservatism
- Traditionalist conservatism in the United States
