= The House of Fear =

The House of Fear may refer to:

== Film ==
- The House of Fear (1915 film), an Ashton-Kirk silent mystery
- The House of Fear (1939 film), an American mystery directed by Joe May
- The House of Fear (1945 film), a Sherlock Holmes crime film

== Literature ==
- The House of Fear, a 1916 novel by Charles Wadsworth Camp
- The House of Fear, a 1927 novel by Robert W. Service
- The House of Fear (novel), a 1955 translation of Ibne Safi's Khaufnaak Imaraat
- House of Fear, a 1983 novel by Willo Davis Roberts
- The House of Fear, a 1988 book by Leonora Carrington
- The House of Fear: A Study in Comparative Religions, a 1989 book by Chet Williamson
- The House of Fear, a 1991 novel by Jahnna N. Malcolm
- House of Fear: An Anthology of Haunted House Stories, a 2011 short story collection by Jonathan Oliver

== See also ==
- The House of Fear, in the 1961 film Atlantis, the Lost Continent
- Old House of Fear, 1961 novel by Russell Kirk
- Wycliffe and the House of Fear, a 1995 crime novel by W. J. Burley
- House of Fears, a 2007 American horror film
