= Stratford Caldecott =

British author, editor, publisher, and blogger (1953–2014)

- in later life
- Born: 26 November 1953; London
- Died: 17 July 2014 (aged 60); Oxford
- Education: Dulwich College; Hertford College, Oxford
- Occupations: Catholic author, editor
- Notable work: Secret Fire: The Spiritual Vision of J.R.R. Tolkien

Stratford Caldecott (26 November 1953 – 17 July 2014) was a Catholic author, editor, publisher, and blogger. His work spanned subjects as diverse as literature, education, theology, apologetics, economics, environmental stewardship, sacred geometry, art, and culture. His books include Secret Fire, Radiance of Being, Beauty for Truth's Sake, All Things Made New, and Not as the World Gives. He was a founding editor of the online journal Humanum and a contributor for several online and print journals. He was inspired by the Catholic author J. R. R. Tolkien and became known as a Tolkien scholar.

== Early life and education ==
Stratford Caldecott was born in 1953, in London, England, to parents who had left South Africa in 1951. The family espoused no particular religious beliefs. As a child, he was sickly and bedridden, and developed a close relationship with his mother. His father was a publisher with Penguin Books, which fuelled Stratford's love of reading. He attended Dulwich College. As a teenager he fell in love with America through his exposure to comic books, their portrayal of the fight between good and evil, and the theme of hope. Between Dulwich and university he went to America, earning money as a "mother's help", and stayed first with a family in New England before touring the continent by Greyhound bus. After a year, he attended Hertford College, Oxford on scholarship and studied Philosophy and Psychology. Caldecott says that at the age of 14 he had what he terms "a philosophical insight" that there was more to the universe than matter and energy. His metaphysical samplings at Oxford led him to seek a religious tradition. Shortly after graduating, he became a member of the Baháʼí Faith. He later explored Sufism and Buddhism, and began a correspondence with the philosopher Robert Bolton, author of numerous books on spirituality.

After taking his degree, Caldecott pursued a career in publishing and education as a senior editor for the publishers Routledge, HarperCollins, and T&T Clark. In 1977, he married fellow student Leonie Richards. The ceremony was held in an Anglican ceremony, in deference to her family. He and his wife had three daughters.

Caldecott came to realize that the stories which had informed his early youth, those of King Arthur and the Knights of the Round Table, the Quest of the Holy Grail, C. S. Lewis's The Chronicles of Narnia, and J. R. R. Tolkien's The Lord of the Rings all reflected a Christian worldview. "All along, my imagination had been built on a Christian foundation, and I had never noticed it before. I knew now that in some sense, on some level, I was already a Christian." His reading then turned to Étienne Gilson, Jacques Maritain and Thomas Aquinas. In 1980 he was baptised into the Catholic Church. This was not well received by his father, who viewed Catholicism as "worse than apartheid".

== Career ==
Caldecott taught a course called "Christianity and Society" at Plater College in Headington, Oxford.

He was a G. K. Chesterton Research Fellow at St Benet's Hall, Oxford. His devotion to Chesterton led to his becoming something of an expert on him. He also served as a commissioning editor for the Catholic Truth Society.

From 2010, he and his wife Leonie served as co-editors of the UK and Ireland edition of Magnificat. He became the founding editor of the journal Humanum, under the aegis of the Washington DC John Paul II Institute.

=== Centre for Faith & Culture ===
In 1994 the Caldecotts founded a research centre in Oxford called the Centre for Faith & Culture (CFC), associated with The Chesterton Review and the international review Communio. Its newsletter, the Faith & Culture Bulletin, was offered free of charge. The Oxford Centre was initially a partnership between Westminster College, Oxford and the Edinburgh theological publishers T&T Clark. The two partners divided the costs between them, and the Centre's activities were equally divided between conferences and publications. Before long it also provided a home for the G. K. Chesterton Library created by Aidan Mackey. In 1998, after Westminster College was acquired by Oxford Brookes University, the CFC moved to Plater College in Headington, maintaining its activities with partial support from T&T Clark and from the G. K. Chesterton Institute, founded by Rev. Ian J. Boyd, publisher of The Chesterton Review.

In 2002, after the demise of Plater College, the Centre for Faith & Culture merged for several years with the G. K. Chesterton Institute, creating the "G. K. Chesterton Institute for Faith & Culture", which was eventually based at Seton Hall University in New Jersey with its Oxford Centre in King Street, Oxford. After 2006 Seton Hall ceased to support the Centre in Oxford and it became independent again.

=== Second Spring ===
Caldecott was a co-director of Second Spring, (named after John Henry Newman's famous sermon of 1852, in which Newman predicted a revival of Catholicism in England). Second Spring initially appeared in 1992 as an 8-page quarterly supplement in the American Catholic World Report. In 2001 Second Spring merged with the Newsletter of the Centre and started to appear as an 80-page journal twice a year.

The Caldecotts, together with the artist David Clayton, started a company called "ResSource" to develop educational projects in the spirit of Second Spring, but it ceased trading after Clayton took up a post at the Thomas More College of Liberal Arts in New Hampshire. The Caldecotts, along with their eldest daughter Teresa, eventually founded their own company, Second Spring Oxford Ltd, in order to manage several editorial contracts as well as undertaking their own publishing programme. Thomas More College became the distributor of Second Spring Journal, as well as sending students to a summer school organised by Second Spring in Oxford.

Caldecott's blogs "Beauty in Education", "The Economy Project", and "All Things Made New" serve as resource collections on the topics of education, economics and social justice, and perennial wisdom, and served also as forums for a growing network of friends who, under the banner "Second Spring Associates", hoped to expand the reach of his Second Spring work internationally. The work in this direction was temporarily suspended at his death, but in 2017 Leonie used her own funds to re-launch the website at second spring.co.uk, including an online version of the journal, Second Spring Current.

== Writing ==
=== Catholicism ===
Caldecott's writing draws on the work of Catholic intellectuals including Hans Urs von Balthasar, Joseph Ratzinger, Pope John Paul II, Henri de Lubac, Luigi Giussani, G. K. Chesterton, John Henry Newman, and Jacques Maritain. Caldecott's articles appeared in Oasis, the National Catholic Register, Touchstone, This Rock, Radical Orthodoxy Journal, The Chesterton Review, Communio and Parabola. He was a senior contributor to The Imaginative Conservative. He organized conferences such as "Beyond the Prosaic" on the reform of the Liturgy and "Eternity in Time" on Christopher Dawson's contribution to the Catholic idea of history.

=== On Tolkien ===
J. R. R. Tolkien was among the writers whose works influenced Caldecott's conversion to Christianity. Caldecott became an authority on the Christian themes in Tolkien's The Lord of the Rings. Caldecott was a contributing editor to A Hidden Presence, the Catholic Imagination of J.R.R. Tolkien. In Catholic Literary Giants, Joseph Pearce notes Caldecott's contribution to A Hidden Presence and recommends the volume as a valuable scholarly contribution to the literature on Tolkien's work. Caldecott's essay, "The Lord & Lady of the Rings", describing Marian influences in Tolkien's work, was cited by Sarah Jane Boss in her work on traditions of Marian doctrine and devotion.

The Power of the Ring: The Spiritual Vision Behind The Lord of the Rings (Crossroad, 2005, 2011) was originally called Secret Fire when first published by DLT. It was translated into Spanish, Italian, and Russian, and re-issued by Crossroad in an expanded edition in 2012. The Power of the Ring explores the spiritual, theological, and philosophical meaning of the work – Tolkien's faith, which was influenced by the Oratory of St Philip. The historian Bradley J. Birzer, in The J. R. R. Tolkien Encyclopedia, calls Secret Fire "the best of the post-Pearce Christian works" on Tolkien. Mike Foster, in Tolkien Studies, writes that "this self-described search for 'Tolkien's secret fire' finds it in the author's devout Catholicism". He finds Caldecott's blending of criticism and Catholicism problematic, as "the reader perforce has two subjects to weigh and balance: literary scholarship and theological interpretation". Among other things, Foster notes that Frodo "fails his last temptation", as it is Gollum's action that destroys the Ring. Foster finds Caldecott's interpretation, that "in the end it is not Frodo who saves Middle-earth at all ... nor Gollum, who took the Ring into the Fire. It can only be God himself, ... using even our mistakes and the designs of the Enemy ... to bring about our good" to be "simply too forgiving of Frodo, whose will fails him". Colin Duriez, reviewing the book for Theology, calls it a "perceptive and well-reasoned book" that examines Tolkien's appeal to people "from Christian to neo-pagan". Among these reasons, writes Duriez, is the rooting of his writing in the First World War, and Tolkien's experience of loss and death; and "his love affair with language". Duriez remarks, too, on Caldecott's account of Tolkien's "veneration of Mary" and its impact on the Elf-lady Galadriel and "the angelic Elbereth".

== Death ==
As a teenager Caldecott had fallen in love with America because of its comic books. He loved the fight between good and evil, and the theme of hope that the comics portrayed. When he was dying from prostate cancer in May 2014, he was too ill to see the latest Avengers movie, Captain America: The Winter Soldier, in the cinema and he was not expected to survive long enough for the Blu-ray release. His daughter, Sophie Caldecott Lippiatt, used an online campaign to persuade the producer Marvel Studios and distributor Walt Disney Studios Motion Pictures to send a copy so that he could watch it at home. Many actors who had portrayed Marvel characters posted selfies in support. Marvel arranged an exclusive advanced screening on DVD for Caldecott at his home.

Caldecott's final thoughts on life and faith, death and eternal life were presented in an essay in the online journal The Imaginative Conservative. His funeral Mass was celebrated at the Oxford Oratory on 31 July 2014. He is buried in Wolvercote Cemetery, Oxford, near Tolkien's grave.

Many tributes appeared after his death. Kathy Schiffer of Ave Maria Radio described Caldecott as "a giant in the Catholic world". Pierpaolo Finaldi, managing editor of the Catholic Truth Society, noted Caldecott's "encyclopaedic knowledge of the faith". Michael J. Lichens, editor of the website Catholic Exchange, described Caldecott as "...without a doubt, the most powerful voice for Catholic culture in the Anglophone world." David B. Burrell recommends The Grandeur of Reason and notes particularly Caldecott's approach to the problem of a perception of polarity between faith and reason by explicit attention to culture. Peter Casarella cites "The Marian Dimension of Existence" in Healy and Schindler, eds. Being Holy in the World in "Public Reason and Intercultural Dialogue" in At the Limits of the Secular: Reflections on Faith and Public Life, William A. Barbieri Jr. ed, Eerdmans 2014.

== Awards and distinctions ==
- Honorary doctorate in theology by the John Paul II Institute in Washington DC
- Paideia Prize for work in education
- A volume of essays in his honour, The Beauty of God's House was published posthumously in 2014. Canadian Cardinal Marc Ouellet and Nottingham Professor John Milbank contributed.

== Bibliography ==
=== Books ===
- Secret Fire: The Spiritual Vision of J.R.R. Tolkien (Darton, Longman, & Todd, 2003) ISBN 9780232524772
  - revised as Power of the Ring: The Spiritual Vision Behind The Lord of the Rings (Crossroad, 2005 and 2012)
- The Seven Sacraments: Entering the Mysteries of God (Crossroad, 2006) ISBN 9780824523763
- Beauty for Truth's Sake: On the Re-enchantment of Education (Brazos, 2009; 2nd edition: 2017) ISBN 9781587434020
- All Things Made New: The Mysteries of the World in Christ (Angelico/Sophia Perennis, 2011) ISBN 9781621385677
- Beauty in the Word: Rethinking the Foundations of Education (Angelico, 2011) ISBN 9781621380047
- The Radiance of Being: Dimensions of Cosmic Christianity (Angelico, 2013) ISBN 9781621380306
- Not as the World Gives: The Way of Creative Justice (Angelico, 2014) ISBN 9781621380542

=== Booklets ===
- Catholic Social Teaching: A Way In (Catholic Truth Society, 2001) ISBN 9781860821165
- Companion to the Book of Revelation, CTS Companions, (Catholic Truth Society, 2008) ISBN 9781860825019
- Catholicism and Other Religions: Introduction to Interfaith Dialogue (Catholic Truth Society, 2009)

=== Books from conferences ===
Stratford both edited and contributed to these volumes.

- Beyond the Prosaic: Renewing the Liturgical Movement (T&T Clark, 2000) ISBN 9780567086136
- Tolkien's The Lord of the Rings: Sources of Inspiration (Co-editor: Thomas M. Honegger, Walking Tree, 2008) ISBN 9783905703122
- Eternity in Time: Christopher Dawson and the Catholic Idea of History (T&T Clark, 1997) ISBN 9780567085481
