= Bruce Frohnen =

Bruce P. Frohnen is a Professor of Law at Ohio Northern University College of Law, where he teaches courses in Public and Constitutional Law, Jurisprudence, and Legal Profession.

== Early life ==
He holds a J.D. from Emory University School of Law, where he worked under the late Harold J. Berman, a noted legal historian involved in renewing understanding of the role of religion in the development of the western legal tradition. He also holds a Ph.D. in Government from Cornell University and taught political philosophy for several years before entering law school.

He has served as Charles Evans Hughes Professor of Jurisprudence at Colgate University and as a visiting scholar at the Johns Hopkins School of Advanced International Studies. He was also a lecturer in the political science department at Oglethorpe University from 1992 to 1993.

== Scholarship ==
His scholarship has focused on integrating the study of law and religion and law and politics through an understanding of historical development. His work has sought to show that human rights are by nature social, that the separation of powers of our constitutional system cannot be maintained without an ethos of virtue and that the roots of republican free government lie, not in a few phrases in the Declaration of Independence, but in a long tradition of thought and action by which our tradition of ordered liberty was developed.

Frohnen has authored two books, Virtue and the Promise of Conservatism: The Legacy of Burke and Tocqueville and The New Communitarians and the Crisis of Modern Liberalism. He has edited and/or co-edited a number of volumes including American Conservatism: An Encyclopedia, which was the subject of a front-page article in The New York Times, two volumes of primary source materials dealing with American constitutional history (The American Republic and The American Nation) and Rethinking Rights: Historical, Political, and Philosophical Perspectives, which was named an outstanding academic title by Choice: Current Reviews for Academic Libraries. His law review articles have appeared in journals including the George Washington Law Review, the Journal of Law & Politics at the University of Virginia, the Harvard Journal of Law & Public Policy and the American Journal of Jurisprudence, among others.

== Conservatism ==
Frohnen, who serves as a senior fellow at the Russell Kirk Center for Cultural Renewal, was a legislative aide and speech writer for Republican Senator Spencer Abraham, and a member of the Board of the Philadelphia Society. He writes for The Imaginative Conservative and has been identified as a political conservative. Beau Breslin, in his book The Communitarian Constitution, refers to him, along with Georgetown University Professor of Government George W. Carey and others, as a “right-wing communitarian” because of his emphasis on the importance of local social and religious associations in the formation of virtuous persons and decent lives. Frohnen, however, has also gone on the public record as an opponent of current American policies in the Muslim world (regarding Iraq and Afghanistan in particular). He also distanced himself from “conservative” favoring of big business, criticizing what he has called “economic policies and political cronyism... enabling economic predators.” He considers himself a “pluralist” in the tradition of Alexis de Tocqueville, Edmund Burke, Robert Nisbet, Bertrand de Jouvenel, Russell Kirk, Alasdair MacIntyre, and others often labeled conservative but most concerned with reinvigorating a diversity of local associations as necessary for human flourishing and the taming of political power.
