= What Shadows We Pursue =

First edition, cover art by author

What Shadows We Pursue (2003), subtitled Ghost Stories, Volume Two, is a posthumously published collection of short stories by Russell Kirk (1918–1994). It is the second of two such hardcover collections from Ash-Tree Press, a noted contemporary publisher of classic ghost stories. Together with the previous companion volume, Off the Sand Road (2002), it contains the entire corpus of Kirk's short fiction—the only such undertaking by any publisher—including some pieces not easily categorized as ghost stories.

This limited edition book was edited and has an introduction by John Pelan. Its dust jacket front features a woodcut illustration by Kirk himself, with the same illustration reprinted on page 248 of the text. The whole volume is xiv + 254 pages long and, according to the volume's colophon, "was published on 28 March 2003 and is limited to Five Hundred copies with additional copies produced for legal deposit and contractual purposes." The texts are reprinted with Canadian/UK-style spelling and punctuation in accordance with the Canadian publisher's policy, though Kirk was an American.

The earlier companion volume, Off the Sand Road, misprinted the story, "Fate's Purse". In this volume, the story's full text is restored as an appendix. A note, on page 228 of What Shadows We Pursue, explains: "Unfortunately, a production error led to the final four paragraphs of the story being omitted from [the earlier] edition. To correct the error, we have preferred to include the full text of the story in this, the second volume."

This collection is named after one of its stories, "What Shadows We Pursue", which first appeared in the January, 1953, issue of The Magazine of Fantasy and Science Fiction.

== Contents ==
The contents, listed sequentially from the text, with years of original publication noted in parentheses:

- Introduction by John Pelan:
  - "The Wizard of Mecosta" (2003)
- Short stories by Russell Kirk:
  - "The Invasion of the Church of the Holy Ghost" (1983)
  - "What Shadows We Pursue" (1953)
  - "The Peculiar Demesne of Archvicar Gerontion" (1980)
  - "Uncle Isaiah" (1951)
  - "The Reflex-Man of Whinnymuir Close" (1983)
  - "The Cellar of Little Egypt" (1962)
  - "Skyberia" (1952)
  - "Lost Lake" (1957)
  - "The Last God's Dream" (1979)
  - "Ex Tenebris" (1957)
  - "Watchers at the Strait Gate" (1980)
- Appendix:
  - "Fate's Purse" (1979; a corrected reprinting of the entire story from the earlier companion volume)
