= Russell Kirk Center for Cultural Renewal =

Organization

The Russell Kirk Center for Cultural Renewal is a nonprofit educational organization based in Mecosta, Michigan. It was founded in order to continue the legacy of Dr. Russell Kirk, an American political theorist, historian, social critic, literary critic, and fiction author. The Center is known for promoting traditionalist conservatism and regularly publishing Studies in Burke and His Time and The University Bookman, the oldest conservative book review in the United States.

Based in Russell Kirk's ancestral home of Mecosta, Michigan, the Russell Kirk Center hosts seminars, research, and fellowship opportunities in what is now a unique residential library and conference center. These activities, rooted in one of American conservatism's historic places, constitute an educational community at the core of the Center's mission.

== The University Bookman ==
The University Bookman was founded by Russell Kirk in 1960 as A Quarterly Review of Educational Materials. It is the oldest continuously published right-leaning book journal in the United States. From 1960 to 1990, the journal was distributed freely to subscribers of National Review. For most of its history, the journal had been edited by members of the Kirk family, until 2005, when Gerald Russello was appointed editor.

Some of its notable contributors include James Schall, Peter Augustine Lawler, Allan Carlson, John Lukacs, and George Nash.

== Staff ==
The Russell Kirk Center's president is Annette Y. Kirk, widow of Russell Kirk. Jeffrey O. Nelson, Kirk's son-in-law, is director of publications. Senior Fellows at the Center include Bruce Frohnen, Vigen Guroian, Gleaves Whitney, and others. The Center's Board of Advisors includes T. Kenneth Cribb, Jr., John Engler, Edwin Feulner, Forrest McDonald, and others.
