= Off the Sand Road =

First edition, Cover art by author

Off the Sand Road (2002), subtitled Ghost Stories, Volume One, is a posthumously published collection of short stories by Russell Kirk (1918–1994). It is the first of two such hardcover collections from Ash-Tree Press, a small but respected contemporary publisher of ghost stories, classic and new alike. Together with its companion volume, What Shadows We Pursue (2003), it presents the entire corpus of Kirk's short fiction—the only such undertaking by any publisher—including some pieces more accurately categorized as horror, fantasy, or science fiction.

This limited edition book was edited and has an introduction by John Pelan. Its dust jacket front features a woodcut illustration by Kirk himself, with the same illustration reprinted at the end of the text, instead of receiving the more traditional placement as frontispiece. The whole volume is xviii + 206 pages long and, according to the volume's colophon, "was published on 18 October 2002 and is limited to Five Hundred copies with additional copies produced for legal deposit and contractual purposes." The texts are reprinted with Canadian/UK-style spelling and punctuation in accordance with the Canadian publisher's policy, though Kirk was an American.

The story "Fate's Purse" is misprinted in this volume without the text's last four paragraphs. In the companion volume, What Shadows We Pursue, the full story appears as an appendix, with the ending restored.

This collection is named after one of its stories, which first appeared in the March 1952 issue of the then-extant journal World Review. Another story, "Balgrummo's Hell", which first appeared in the July 1967 issue of The Magazine of Fantasy and Science Fiction, came to be used as a prologue to the revised edition of Kirk's novel Lord of the Hollow Dark (original, 1979; revised, 1989). The afterword, "A Cautionary Note on the Ghostly Tale", first appeared in the April–May 1962 issue of the then-extant journal The Critic and has been reprinted in several Kirk story collections and elsewhere since.

== Contents ==
The contents, listed sequentially from the text, with years of original publication noted in parentheses:

- Half title
- Title page
- Edition notice
- Table of contents
- Introduction by John Pelan:
  - "The Ghosts of Piety Hill" (2002)
- Short stories by Russell Kirk:
  - "The Surly Sullen Bell" (1950)
  - "Behind the Stumps" (1950)
  - "Sorworth Place" (1952)
  - "Balgrummo's Hell" (1967)
  - "There's a Long, Long Trail A-Winding" (1976)
  - "Saviourgate" (1976)
  - "Off the Sand Road" (1952)
  - "Fate's Purse" (1979; a passage omitted here due to production error)
  - "The Princess of All Lands" (1979)
  - "An Encounter by Mortstone Pond" (1984)
  - "Lex Talionis" (1979)
- Essay by Kirk (serving as afterword):
  - "A Cautionary Note on the Ghostly Tale" (1962)
- Illustration by Kirk (in lieu of frontispiece)
- Colophon
- Chronological list of books published by Ash-Tree Press
