= Uel =

Uel may refer to:

== People ==
- Uel (biblical figure), a minor biblical figure mentioned in the Book of Ezra
- Uel Eubanks (1903–1954), baseball pitcher, briefly with the Chicago Cubs
- Uel Graham (born 1967), Irish former cricketer
- Uel Key, pseudonym of British author Samuel Whittell Key (1874–1948)
- Uel W. Lamkin (1877–1956), president of Northwest Missouri State University

== Places ==
- Uel Siktyakh, a river in Yakutia, Russia

== See also ==
- UEL (disambiguation)
