= Gleaves Whitney =

Gleaves Whitney has been the executive director of the Gerald R. Ford Presidential Foundation since September 2020. Prior to that, he was the director of Grand Valley State University's Hauenstein Center for Presidential Studies beginning in July 2003. He has authored or edited 17 books. Whitney is also a senior scholar at The Imaginative Conservative in Houston, Texas, the first senior fellow at the Russell Kirk Center for Cultural Renewal, a member of the college of fellows at the Dominican School of Philosophy and Theology, Berkeley, a member of the Ronald Reagan Presidential Library's Leadership Development Committee, and a scholar with the Wyoming Catholic College committee of advisors. His work has appeared on blogs and in numerous newspapers, magazines, and journals.

== Education ==
Whitney graduated with honors from Colorado State University (1980), was elected into the Phi Beta Kappa honor society (1980), and was a Fulbright scholar in then-West Germany (1984–85). He did his graduate work at the University of Michigan, where he was a Richard M. Weaver fellow (1987–88) and an H. B. Earhart Fellow (1988–91). Whitney has taught at the University of Michigan, Aquinas College, Droste-Hulshof Gymnasium, Colorado State University, and Grand Valley State University. In 2006, he received the Doctor of Humane Letters honoris causa from the Dominican School of Philosophy and Theology, Berkeley, California.

== Public service ==
Prior to his arrival at Grand Valley State University, Whitney worked 11 years in Michigan Governor John Engler's administration, serving seriatim as senior writer, chief speechwriter, and public historian. In 1993, the governor assigned him to a task force that helped bring sweeping education and school finance reforms to Michigan that The New York Times called "the most dramatic in the nation."

== Hauenstein Center for Presidential Studies ==
Since Whitney became the director of the Hauenstein Center for Presidential Studies in 2003, the center has experienced tremendous growth. "Gleaves Whitney is a real treasure for those of us who do presidential studies and work in the field of presidential history," said award-winning biographer H. W. Brands. "He’s also one of the most effective entrepreneurs in the business of higher education," he continued. "You can tell this by the growth in the Hauenstein Center over the years that he’s been the director."

"Gleaves Whitney and his energetic team at the Hauenstein Center have become, in a remarkably short time, a force to reckon with -- and learn from -- in the presidential studies field," said historian Richard Norton Smith. "The Hauenstein Center is a jewel in the crown of Michigan."

Whitney has been the architect of more than 500 programs, including numerous national conferences covered by C-SPAN and one webcast—Hitchens vs. Hitchens—that was seen in real time to more than 3,500 viewers in 18 countries. He has overseen tremendous growth of the Hauenstein Center's website, which has had more than 25 million visitors, and premiered a popular web column called Ask Gleaves—the first presidential Q & A in the nation. He has also created a leadership academy for students and young professionals committed to public service. Its aim is to turn learners into leaders who can make a difference in their communities.

President Gerald R. Ford said, “I am pleased with the extremely successful partnership between the Ford Presidential Library and Museum, the Ford Foundation, and the Hauenstein Center for Presidential Studies. The Hauenstein Center is making its mark with creative programs that help Americans see beyond the headlines. I’m delighted with the work Gleaves Whitney and his dedicated staff are doing to increase our understanding of courageous, effective leadership. It is especially rewarding to work with a presidential leadership center so closely associated with my good friend, Ralph Hauenstein, who is an inspiring example of a life well lived.”

== Partnerships ==
In his current position as executive director of the Gerald R. Ford Presidential Foundation, Gleaves has cultivated many institutional partnerships—e.g., the Gerald R. Ford School of Public Policy at the University of Michigan, the Hauenstein Center at GVSU, and the Gerald R. Ford Presidential Library and Museum—as well as numerous ongoing professional partnerships—e.g., H. W. Brands, Richard Norton Smith, William Barker, and George Nash.

== Other fields ==
In addition to his public work, Whitney is a scholar who writes and lectures nationally on a variety of historical topics. He is author or editor of seventeen books including (with Mark Rozell) "Religion and the American Presidency, 3rd ed." and "Religion and the Bush Presidency." Other books include "American Presidents: Farewell Addresses to the Nation, 1796-2001;" "John Engler: The Man, the Leader & the Legacy;" and 6 volumes of Messages of the Governors of Michigan.

== Selected works ==
- Testing the Limits: George W. Bush and the Imperial Presidency

Edited by Mark Rozell and Gleaves Whitney (Rowman & Littlefield, 2009)

- Religion and the Bush Presidency, 3rd ed.

Edited by Mark Rozell and Gleaves Whitney (Palgrave Macmillan, August 2007)

- Religion and the American Presidency

Edited by Mark Rozell and Gleaves Whitney (Palgrave Macmillan, May 2007)

- American Presidents:

Farewell Messages to the Nation, 1796–2001 Edited by Gleaves Whitney (Lexington, December 2002)

- John Engler: The Man, the Leader & the Legacy

Written by Gleaves Whitney Sleeping Bear Press (December 2002)

== Selected speeches ==
- George Washington: Less than Perfect, Greater than Us
- Indispensable Aide: Alexander Hamilton
- Abraham Lincoln's Unions
- Franklin Delano Roosevelt: The Paradox of Power
- Shakespearean Drama in the American Republic: The Tragedy of Richard Nixon
- Gerald R. Ford: Republican
- Ronald Reagan
- Growth of Presidential Power in the Twentieth Century
- Presidents and the Moral Imagination
