= UEL =

UEL can refer to:

- UEFA Europa League, the second tier of European club football
- United Envirotech, a company based in Singapore
- University of East London, a public university in London, UK
- Universidade Estadual de Londrina (State University of Londrina), a state university in Londrina, Brazil
- United Empire Loyalists, pro-British colonists who left the United States for Canada after the Revolutionary War
- University Endowment Lands, a suburb adjacent to Vancouver, British Columbia, Canada
- Upper explosive limit, maximum concentration in air that will burn
- Unified European Left Group, a group in the Parliamentary Assembly of the Council of Europe
- Unified Expression Language, part of Java EE 6
- UEL (Universal Exit Language), a command in Hewlett-Packard Printer Command Language, used at the end of a printer data stream

== See also ==
- Uel (disambiguation), name of a minor old Testament figure, used as a given name
