= Watchers at the Strait Gate =

1984 collection of stories by Russell Kirk

- Dust-jacket illustration by Renée Radell.
- Author: Russell Kirk
- Illustrator: Andrew Smith
- Cover artist: Renée Radell
- Language: English
- Genre: Fantasy, horror
- Publisher: Arkham House
- Publication date: 1984
- Publication place: United States
- Media type: Print (hardback)
- Pages: xiv, 256
- ISBN: 0-87054-098-X
- OCLC: 10323051
- Dewey Decimal: 813/.54 19
- LC Class: PS3521.I665 W3 1984

Watchers at the Strait Gate is a collection of stories by American writer Russell Kirk. It was released in 1984 and was the author's second book published by Arkham House, and Kirk's third collection of supernatural stories. It was published in an edition of 3,459 copies.

== Contents ==
Watchers at the Strait Gate contains the following tales:

1. "A Cautionary Note on the Ghostly Tale"
2. "The Invasion of the Church of the Holy Ghost"
3. "The Surly Sullen Bell"
4. "The Peculiar Demesne of Archvicar Gerontion"
5. "Uncle Isaiah"
6. "The Reflex-Man in Whinnymuir Close"
7. "What Shadows We Pursue"
8. "Lex Talionis"
9. "Fate's Purse"
10. "An Encounter by Mortstone Pond"
11. "Watchers at the Strait Gate"

== Sources ==
- Jaffery, Sheldon (1989). The Arkham House Companion. Mercer Island, WA: Starmont House, Inc. pp. 135–136. ISBN 1-55742-005-X.
- Chalker, Jack L.; Mark Owings (1998). The Science-Fantasy Publishers: A Bibliographic History, 1923-1998. Westminster, MD and Baltimore: Mirage Press, Ltd. p. 55.
- Joshi, S.T. (1999). Sixty Years of Arkham House: A History and Bibliography. Sauk City, WI: Arkham House. p. 152. ISBN 0-87054-176-5.
- Nielsen, Leon (2004). Arkham House Books: A Collector's Guide. Jefferson, NC and London: McFarland & Company, Inc. p. 130. ISBN 0-7864-1785-4.
