= The Princess of All Lands =

1979 collection of stories by Russell Kirk

- Dust-jacket illustration by Joe Wehrle, Jr.
- Author: Russell Kirk
- Illustrator: frontispiece and interior decorations by Joe Wehrle, Jr.
- Cover artist: Joe Wehrle, Jr.
- Language: English
- Genre: Fantasy, Horror
- Publisher: Arkham House
- Publication date: 1979
- Publication place: United States
- Media type: Print (hardback)
- Pages: viii, 228
- ISBN: 0-87054-084-X
- OCLC: 4641704
- Dewey Decimal: 813/.5/4
- LC Class: PZ4.K588 Pr PS3521.I665

The Princess of All Lands is a collection of stories by American writer Russell Kirk. It was released in 1979 and was the author's first book published by Arkham House. It was published in an edition of 4,120 copies. The story "There's a Long, Long Trail A-Winding" had won a World Fantasy Award in 1977.

== Contents ==
The Princess of All Lands contains the following tales:

1. "Prologue"
2. "Sorworth Place"
3. "Behind the Stumps"
4. "The Princess of All Lands"
5. "The Last God's Dream"
6. "The Cellar of Little Egypt"
7. "Ex Tenebris"
8. "Balgrummo's Hell"
9. "There's a Long, Long Trail A-Winding"
10. "Saviourgate"

== Sources ==
- Jaffery, Sheldon (1989). The Arkham House Companion. Mercer Island, WA: Starmont House, Inc. pp. 122–123. ISBN 1-55742-005-X.
- Chalker, Jack L.; Mark Owings (1998). The Science-Fantasy Publishers: A Bibliographic History, 1923-1998. Westminster, MD and Baltimore: Mirage Press, Ltd. p. 53.
- Joshi, S.T. (1999). Sixty Years of Arkham House: A History and Bibliography. Sauk City, WI: Arkham House. p. 145. ISBN 0-87054-176-5.
- Nielsen, Leon (2004). Arkham House Books: A Collector's Guide. Jefferson, NC and London: McFarland & Company, Inc. p. 126. ISBN 0-7864-1785-4.
