= Roots of American Order =

1974 book by Russell Kirk

Roots of American Order is a book written by Russell Kirk, originally published in 1974 by Open Court Publishing Company. Later editions have been published by Regnery Publishing and the Intercollegiate Studies Institute.

In the book, Kirk traces the basic theories that underpin American civilization to ancient Jerusalem, Athens, Rome, and London and suggests that the ideas on which modern America has been built have their roots in these ancient civilizations, passed down through the Greek, Roman, Early Christian, and British civilizations through to the Founding Fathers of the United States.
