= Bradley J. Birzer =

American historian (born 1967)

- Born: September 6, 1967 (age 58)
- Education: University of Notre Dame (BA); Indiana University Bloomington (PhD)
- Occupation: Historian
- Employer: Hillsdale College

Bradley J. Birzer (born September 6, 1967) is an American historian. He is a history professor and the Russell Amos Kirk Chair in American Studies at Hillsdale College, the author of five books and the co-founder of The Imaginative Conservative. He is known also as a Tolkien scholar.

== Early life ==
Birzer graduated from the University of Notre Dame, where he earned a bachelor's degree in 1990. He earned a PhD from Indiana University Bloomington in 1998.

== Career ==
Birzer is a History professor and the Russell Amos Kirk Chair in American Studies at Hillsdale College.

Birzer is the author of several books. His first book, J.R.R. Tolkien's Sanctifying Myth, was about Roman Catholicism in J. R. R. Tolkien's novels. It examines Tolkien's views on myth and subcreation, the theological cosmology of Middle-earth, and his approaches to heroism, the nature of evil, and modernity.

His second book looked at Saint Augustine's influence on the British 20th century Catholic historian Christopher Dawson. His third book was a biography of Charles Carroll of Carrollton, the only Roman Catholic signer of the Declaration of Independence. His two other books were about the Canadian musician Neil Peart and the American political theorist and literary critic Russell Kirk.

From 2014 to 2015, Birzer was visiting scholar in conservative thought and policy at the University of Colorado Boulder's Center for Western Civilization, Thought & Policy.

=== Reception ===
Journalist Christopher Caldwell, reviewing Birzer's book Russell Kirk: American Conservative for The New York Times, states that Birzer "succeeds admirably" in discerning an overarching project in Russell Kirk's writing. He also says, however, that Birzer "exaggerates Kirk's importance in the past decades' revival of interest in Burke and Tocqueville" and "ascribes to Kirk a larger role than the facts warrant in the early stages of Barry Goldwater's campaign for the 1964 Republican nomination". He concludes that "Kirk is too often the book's hero rather than its subject".

Political scientist Lee Trepanier, reviewing the same book for The Independent Review, states that "Birzer's book both deepens and broadens the themes that previous biographies about Kirk have explored" and concludes that "Birzer's book is not only accessible and scholarly but provides the historical, intellectual, and philosophical context to understand the man and his ideas. For years to come, it will be seen as the standard, if not definitive, account of Russell Kirk's life and ideas".

Political scientist Jeff Taylor, reviewing Birzer's book In Defense of Andrew Jackson for The American Conservative, states that, before reading the book, he "feared this might be a lightweight pro-Jackson tract, with a trendy Donald Trump tie-in", but admits that he was wrong after reading it. He praises Birzer as a bona fide historian and notes that the tone of the book is not defensive.

Author and columnist Dave Benner, reviewing the same book for the Abbeville Institute, criticizes its title, saying that it "does not properly conceptualize the book's chief premise" because "Birzer does more to defend the age which produced a Jackson than Jackson himself", but concludes that:

Rather than defend or criticize Jackson’s views and responses to every conceivable political subject, Birzer’s work instead portrays Jackson as a man who was frank, honest, and consistent – for better or worse. Rather than justify Jackson’s deeds, In Defense of Jackson instead depicts Jackson in the context of his own world. In doing so, Birzer makes a remarkable contribution to the Jackson historiography that effectively tackles Old Hickory’s political disposition in a concise single volume. Whether one enters into its pages admiring or loathing Jackson, Birzer’s book is a must-read.

== Selected works ==
- Birzer, Bradley J. (2003). J.R.R. Tolkien's Sanctifying Myth: Understanding Middle-earth. Wilmington, Delaware: ISI Books. ISBN 9781932236200. OCLC 54742159.
- Birzer, Bradley J. (2007). Sanctifying the World: The Augustinian Life and Mind of Christopher Dawson. Front Royal, Virginia: Christendom Press. ISBN 9780931888861. OCLC 230095474.
- Birzer, Bradley J. (2014). American Cicero: Charles Carroll of Carrollton. Wilmington, Delaware: ISI Books. ISBN 9781497635715. OCLC 883300592.
- Birzer, Bradley J. (2015). Neil Peart: Cultural (Re)Percussions. Colorado Springs, Colorado: WordFire Press. ISBN 9781614753544. OCLC 923310688.
- Birzer, Bradley J. (2015). Russell Kirk: American Conservative. Lexington, Kentucky: University Press of Kentucky. ISBN 9780813166193. OCLC 973052580.
- Birzer, Bradley J. (2018). In Defense of Andrew Jackson. Washington, D.C.: Simon and Schuster. ISBN 9781621578437.
