= John Pelan =

American writer (1957–2021)

- Born: July 19, 1957; Seattle, Washington, U.S.
- Died: April 12, 2021 (aged 63); Albuquerque, New Mexico, U.S.
- Occupations: Writer; editor; publisher
- Writing career
- Genres: Horror fiction, Science-fiction

John C. Pelan (July 19, 1957 – April 12, 2021) was an American author, editor and publisher in the small press science-fiction, weird and horror fiction genres.

He first founded Axolotl Press in 1986 and published several volumes by authors such as Tim Powers, Charles de Lint, Michael Shea and James P. Blaylock. Following this, he founded Darkside Press, Silver Salamander Press and co-founded Midnight House. Darkside Press printed classics of Science Fiction, Midnight House published classic horror fiction (including Charles Birkin, Jane Rice and R. R. Ryan) and Silver Salamander Press was devoted to new works of modern horror, but all three have been inactive since 2006.

Pelan has edited over two dozen single-author collections and novels by such authors as Russell Kirk, Violet Hunt and Fritz Leiber for various publishers including Ash-Tree Press. He was working on assembling collections by, Uel Key, Daniel F. Galouye and Richard B. Gamon. He was also the editor of several "new fiction" anthologies, including Darkside: Horror for the Next Millennium, The Devil Is Not Mocked, The Last Continent: New Tales of Zothique, The Children of Cthulhu and the Bram Stoker Award-winning The Darker Side.

Pelan's short stories have appeared in Carpe Noctem, The Urbanite, Enigmatic Tales, and on-line at Gothic.net and Horrorfind.com. His first novella, the Lovecraftian work The Colour Out of Darkness, was published by Cemetery Dance Publications. Pelan died on April 12, 2021, from a heart attack.

== Select bibliography ==
=== Short stories ===
- "The Piano Player Has No Fingers" co-authored with Edward Lee and published in Palace Corbie #7 (1997)
- "Genesis Revisited" published in Palace Corbie #7 (1997)
- "Girl's Night Out" co-authored with Edward Lee and published in Brutarian #23 (1997)
- "The Case of the Police Officer's Cock Ring and The Piano Player Who Had No Fingers", co-authored with Edward Lee, Dark Raptor Press (1998)
- "Stillborn" co-authored with Edward Lee and published in Imagination Fully Dilated, editors Alan M. Clark & Elizabeth Engstrom (Cemetery Dance Publications, 1998)
- "TV Eye" published in Nasty Piece of Work #10 (1998)
- "Twins" published in The Urbanite #10 (1998)

=== Novels ===
- Goon co-authored with Edward Lee, Necro Publications (1995)

Goon co-authored with Edward Lee, The Overlook Connection (2003)

- Shifters co-authored with Edward Lee, Obsidian Books,(1998)
- Splatterspunk: The Micah Hayes Stories co-authored with Edward Lee, Sideshow Press (1998)
- An Antique Vintage, The Gargadillo Press (1999)
- The Colour Out of Darkness, Cemetery Dance Publications (2004)

=== Anthologies edited ===
- Axolotl Special 1, Axolotl Press (1989)
- Darkside: Horror for the Next Millennium, Darkside Press (1995)

Darkside: Horror for the Next Millennium, Penguin Books (1997)

- The Last Continent: New Tales of Zothique, Shadowlands Press (1999)
- The Children of Cthulhu co-edited with Benjamin Adams, Del Rey Books (2002)
- The Darker Side: Generations of Horror, Penguin Books (2002)
- Shadows Over Baker Street co-edited with Michael Reaves, Del Rey Books (2003)
- Lost on the Darkside, Roc Books (2005)
