= Vigen Guroian =

American Eastern Orthodox theologian (born 1948)

Vigen Guroian (born 1948) is an Armenian Orthodox Christian theologian and professor who has written widely on ethics, politics, culture, literature, education, and gardening. He taught for many years at Loyola University Maryland, St. Nersess Armenian Seminary in New York, and the University of Virginia. In his retirement he continues to publish, lecture, and lead seminars in North America, Europe, and the Near East. He lives in Culpeper, Virginia.

== Life and career ==
Born in New Rochelle, New York and raised in Stamford, Connecticut, Guroian is the grandchild of Armenian immigrants who fled the genocide of Armenians in the Ottoman Empire (1915-17). In his early academic career he devoted much attention to that catastrophic event. He studied intellectual history and rhetoric at the University of Virginia (1966-1970). After receiving his B.A. at UVA, he entered the army and belonged to Civil Affairs Reserve units. In 1978, he received his Ph.D. in Theology and Culture at Drew University where he had studied under the Jewish theologian and social philosopher Will Herberg (1901-1977). Guroian married June Vranian in 1975.

Guroian's early interest in theological ethics and politics led him to write his doctoral dissertation at Drew University, Politics and Moral Life in the Writing of Edmund Burke and Reinhold Niebuhr. Herberg, however, encouraged Guroian to rediscover the theological Armenian Orthodox patrimony, and Guroian's teaching, research, and writing since have placed him among the principal interpreters of Eastern and Oriental Orthodox Christianity in America.

From 1978 to 1981, Guroian was Assistant Professor of Religious Studies at his alma mater, the University of Virginia, where he also held a post in the Center for Russian and East European Studies.

Guroian taught at Loyola University Maryland as Professor of Theology and Ethics from 1981 to 2008, when he returned to UVA as Professor of Religious Studies in Orthodox Christianity. For 2010-11 he received the University of Virginia Student Council Distinguished Teacher Award.

== Contributions and reception ==
In his theological work, Guroian is known for his ability to compare the theology of the Christian East to that of the West in an irenic and illuminating fashion, particularly in ethics, liturgy, and ecclesiology. In The Melody of Faith: Theology in an Orthodoxy Key (2010), Guroian argues for a significant shift in the theology of redemption currently prevalent in Christian churches. Though he does not dismiss all of the reigning models of redemption or atonement in Western theology, he nonetheless proposes that the ancient medicinal metaphor for salvation be foregrounded. This medicinal and "physicalist" metaphor, which, he writes, is still prominent in Eastern Christian theology, piety, and worship, envisions salvation as the healing and restoration to wholeness of our wounded and diseased human nature by, through, and in Jesus Christ. Guroian also contends that this vision of salvation as healing can contribute to a reappraisal of other central elements of Christian theology, such as love, human freedom, and divine grace.

Discussing Melody of Faith, Donald Fairbairn notes how he has often been told "that one cannot grasp Eastern Orthodoxy through reading books; one has to experience it." He goes on:

To some degree, such a statement is true of any Christian tradition, but it is especially true of Orthodoxy, whose forms of expression and whose overarching themes are so seemingly foreign to Western Christians. But for those whose access to the world of Orthodoxy is limited to books, this new work by Vigen Guroian comes closer to enabling readers to feel the lifeblood of Eastern theology than any other book this reviewer has read.

Other non-Orthodox readers have also highlighted his writings as helpful introductions to Orthodoxy, and have praised the way his articulation of Eastern Christianity may profitably illuminate certain standing problems in Western public discourse. Guroian's work on theological ethics is grounded in liturgy and a robust ecclesiology, a connection he has repeatedly emphasized from Incarnate Love: Essays in Orthodox Ethics (1987, 2002), Ethics After Christendom (1994) through The Orthodox Reality (2019). Rowan Williams, when commenting on Sergius Bulgakov's thought on divine wisdom and its relation to ethics, includes Guroian among a group of influential contemporary philosopher-theologians who have drawn attention to an ecclesial ethic:

…[T]hose great thinkers who in the last 15 or so years have begun to shift Christian ethics towards a different, church-related model are moving in precisely this direction. Whether it’s Alasdair MacIntyre, Stanley Hauerwas, John Millbank or Vigen Guroian (himself an Armenian Christian)–all of these writers in their different ways seem to be to be saying that ethics is to be understood only in the context of the body of Christ. We are not talking about duties and rules, nor are we talking about the freedom of self-expression. When we talk about ethics we are talking about the realization of wisdom–not human prudence, but the self-sacrificing wisdom of God which is the heart of all reality, and the centre of all life.

Beyond his works in formal theology, Guroian has presented the lived experience of Orthodox spirituality in two lyrical and personal books on gardening, Inheriting Paradise (1999) and The Fragrance of God (2006).

Guroian has also written extensively on children's literature and the role it can play in the moral education of children. His most influential book is Tending the Heart of Virtue: How Classic Stories Awaken a Child’s Moral Imagination (1998). This book has found appeal far beyond exclusively academic audiences, and is now a popular resource among parents and teachers in primary education. In it, Guroian illuminates the complex ways in which fairy tales and fantasies educate the ‘moral imagination’—roughly, the faculty by which human beings, even the young, reason from analogy about right and wrong. He examines a wide range of stories–from "Pinocchio" and "The Little Mermaid" to "Charlotte's Web," "The Velveteen Rabbit," "The Wind in the Willows," and the "Chronicles of Narnia"–he argues that these tales capture the meaning of morality through vivid depictions of the struggle between good and evil, in which characters must make difficult choices between right and wrong, or heroes and villains contest the very fate of imaginary worlds. Guroian highlights the classical moral virtues such as faith, courage, and love.

His persuasive evocation of the enduring charm of these stories and similar arguments in other contexts have significantly influenced the Classical education movement and home schooling. In recognition of this contribution, the CiRCE Institute conferred upon Guroian the Russell Kirk Paideia Prize for 2019.

== Honors and awards ==
- Russell Kirk Paideia Prize of the CiRCE Institute, 2019.
- University of Virginia Student Council Distinguished Teacher Award.
- Permanent Senior Fellow of the Russell Kirk Center for Cultural Renewal.
- Senior Fellow of the Center on Law and Religion at Emory University.
- Senior Fellow of The Trinity Forum.
- Distinguished Fellow of the John Jay Institute.
- Wilberforce Senior Fellow of the Prison Fellowship Ministries.
- Salvatori Fellow of the Heritage Foundation.
- Richard M. Weaver Fellow of the Intercollegiate Studies Institute.

== Works ==
- Faith, Church, Mission: Essays for a Renewal in the Armenian Church. Press of the Prelacy of the Armenian Church of America, 1995.
- Life’s Living Toward Dying: A Theological and Medical-ethical Study. Eerdmans, 1996 ISBN 9780802841902
- Tending the Heart of Virtue: How Classic Stories Awaken a Child’s Moral Imagination (Oxford University Press, 1998) ISBN 9780195152647
- Inheriting Paradise: Meditations on Gardening. Eerdmans, 1999 ISBN 9780802845887
- Incarnate Love: Essays in Orthodox Ethics (University Notre Dame Press, 2002) ISBN 9780268031695
- Ethics after Christendom: Toward an Ecclesial Christian Ethic. Wipf & Stock, 2004 ISBN 9781592447671
- (editor) Ancestral Shadows: An Anthology of Ghostly Tales. By Russell Kirk (Eerdmans, 2004) ISBN 9780802839381
- How Shall We Remember? Reflections on the Armenian Genocide and Church Faith. Armenian Apostolic Church, 2005.
- Rallying the Really Human Things: The Moral Imagination in Politics, Literature, and Everyday Life. ISI Books, 2005 ISBN 9781932236491
- The Fragrance of God. Eerdmans, 2006 ISBN 9780802830760
- The Melody of Faith: Theology in an Orthodox Key. Eerdmans, 2010 ISBN 9780802864963
- The Orthodox Reality: Culture, Theology, and Ethics in the Modern World (Baker Academic, 2018) ISBN 9780801099342
- Tending the Heart of Virtue: How Classic Stories Awaken a Child's Moral Imagination (Oxford University Press, 2023) ISBN 9780195384314
- Rallying the Really Human Things (Memoria College Press, 2024) ISBN 9781547705887
