= Uel Key =

Uel Key was the pseudonym of British author Samuel Whittell Key (1874–1948), who wrote short stories regarding Prof. Arnold Rhymer, the Spook Specialist. These tales appeared in Pearson's Magazine in 1917 and 1918 and were later collected in The Broken Fang and Other Experiences of a Specialist in Spooks (1920). A novel concerning Prof. Rhymer, entitled The Yellow Death, was published the following year.

== Prof. Arnold Rhymer, M.D. ==
Key's recurring occult detective, Prof. Arnold Rhymer, is an English medical doctor and lecturer who works closely with Scotland Yard on various cases involving the unusual, weird and/or exotic. Portrayed as a tall, lean, agile and young man, Rhymer is a ghostbuster who depends on his Holmes-like deductive mind and cunning wits to defeat supernatural opponents.

== Bibliography ==
- The Broken Fang and Other Experiences of a Specialist in Spooks (London: Hodder & Stoughton, 1920)
- The Yellow Death (A Tale of Occult Mysteries): Recording a Further Experience of Professor Rhymer the "Spook" Specialist (London: Books Limited, 1921)
