= Christopher Dawson =

British Catholic historian and independent scholar (1889–1970)

Christopher Dawson FBA
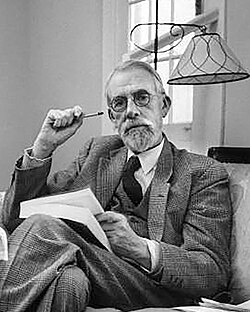
- Dawson in his study
- Born: Christopher Henry Dawson; 12 October 1889; Hay Castle, Hay-on-Wye, Brecknockshire, Wales
- Died: 25 May 1970 (aged 80); Budleigh Salterton, Devon, England
- Occupation: Historian

Academic background
- Education: Trinity College, Oxford Winchester College

Academic work
- Main interests: Cultural history

Christopher Henry Dawson (12 October 1889 – 25 May 1970) was a British Catholic historian and independent scholar, who wrote many books on cultural history and argued for the necessity for Western culture to be in continuity with Christianity not to stagnate and deteriorate. Dawson has been called "the greatest English-speaking Catholic historian of the twentieth century" and was recognized as being able to expound his thought to "Catholic and Protestant, Christian and non-Christian".

== Life ==
Christopher Henry Dawson was born to an Anglo-Catholic family in the Bevan ancestral home of Hay Castle, during the waning years of the Victorian era, and spent most of his childhood among the ruins of the Yorkshire countryside. His parents were Captain Henry P. Dawson and Mary Louisa, the eldest daughter to the Welsh Archdeacon Bevan. Captain Dawson, although an army officer, was more of an explorer than a soldier, and the closest he ever came to actual combat was behind the front-lines in the Franco-Prussian War. He joined a field-ambulance unit with his cousin Herbert Kitchener, later Lord Kitchener of Khartoum.

Dawson was raised in a devout Anglo-Catholic household. Dawson's childhood was reported to be a happy one, spending most of his time in the place which would set the course for his interest in history: the Yorkshire countryside. It is here where Dawson would roam around through abbeys and castles for numerous hours. Dawson experienced the past not as an object of distant sentimentality but as something near to the present which one can find meaning in.

In 1899, he was sent to Bilton Grange for public school. As a consequence of living predominantly secluded from any social interactions besides that of his family, he was frightened of germs. Dawson was exceptional in only History and English. Dawson suffered from internal torment when facing the world outside his cherished home life. The pain which he had suffered during his time there stuck with him. His daughter recalled an incident when he neared the gates of a school she was about to attend, Dawson murmured "I can't face it"; he left the car and sat in the wood reading a book. In 1903, Dawson's father enrolled him to Winchester College. Dawson was a schoolmate of Arnold J. Toynbee but they never encountered each other. Dawson cultivated "a strong historical consciousness that was fed by the aesthetics of that ancient place of worship" Dawson later wrote of his experience at Winchester Cathedral:

I learnt more during my schooldays from my visits to the Cathedral at Winchester than I did from the hours of religious instruction in school. The great church with its tombs of the Saxon kings and the medieval statesmen-bishops, gave one a greater sense of the magnitude of the religious element in our culture and the depths of its roots in our national life than anything one could learn from books.

However, he later stated that Winchester College "was the best of English schools".

He was brought up at Hartlington Hall, Yorkshire. Dawson was educated at Winchester College and Trinity College, Oxford, where he obtained 2nd class honours in Modern History in 1911. After his degree he studied economics. He also read the work of the German theologian Ernst Troeltsch.

During his youth, Dawson had cultivated a profuse interest in Catholicism by virtue of his father's own interests for Roman Catholicism. Dawson recognised a moral and spiritual beauty within the Catholic Church, leading to an intellectual awakening which culminated in his conversion on the Feast of the Epiphany in 1914. Dawson reflected on this time:

From the time I was thirteen or fourteen I had come to know the lives of the Catholic saints and the writings of medieval Catholic mystics and they made so strong an impression on my mind that I felt that there must be something lacking in any theory of life which left no room for these higher types of character and experience.

In 1916, Dawson married Valery Mills, daughter of the architect Walter Edward Mills. They had two daughters and one son.

== Career ==
Dawson was considered a leading Catholic historian. He was a Lecturer in the History of Culture, University College, Exeter (1930–6), the Forwood Lecturer in the Philosophy of Religion, University of Liverpool (1934), the Gifford Lecturer at the University of Edinburgh (1947 and 1948), and the Chauncey Stillman Professor of Roman Catholic Studies at Harvard University (1958–62). Dawson was elected as a Fellow of the British Academy in 1943.

Dawson was an editor of the Dublin Review.

== Writings ==
As soon as men decide that all means are permitted to fight an evil, then their good becomes indistinguishable from the evil that they set out to destroy.

— C.H. Dawson

Dawson began publishing articles in The Sociological Review in 1920. His starting point was close to that of Oswald Spengler and Arnold J. Toynbee, others who were also interested in grand narratives conducted at the level of a civilisation. Dawson's first book, The Age of the Gods (1928), was apparently intended as the first of a set of five to trace European civilisation to the twentieth century. However, he did not follow this plan to a conclusion.

Dawson was a proponent of an 'Old West' theory, the later term of David Gress, who cites Dawson in his From Plato to Nato (1998). Dawson rejected the blanket assumption that the Middle Ages in Europe failed to contribute any essential characteristics. He argued that the medieval Catholic Church was an essential factor in the rise of European civilisation, and wrote extensively in support of that thesis.

== Influence ==
It is the religious impulse which supplies the cohesive force which unifies a society and a culture... A society which has lost its religion becomes sooner or later a society which has lost its culture.

His writings in the 1920s and 1930s made him a significant figure of the time, and an influence in particular on T. S. Eliot, who wrote of his importance. Dawson was on the fringe of 'The Moot', a literary discussion group, and also part of the Sword of the Spirit ecumenical group. According to Bradley Birzer, Dawson also influenced the theological underpinnings of J. R. R. Tolkien's writings.

The topical approach outlined by Dawson for the study of Christian culture forms the core of the Catholic Studies program at Aquinas College. His work was influential in the founding of Campion College and the formation in 2012 of the Christopher Dawson Society for Philosophy and Culture Inc. in Perth, Western Australia. The Christopher Dawson Centre for Cultural Studies in Melbourne, Australia, is also named in his honour and celebrates his memory.

Dawson's vision also underlies the Humanities and Catholic Culture program at the Franciscan University of Steubenville. The 1988–1989 academic year at the College of Europe was named in Dawson's honour.

== Comparable historians ==
As a revivalist of the Christian historian, Christopher Dawson has been compared with Kenneth Scott Latourette and Herbert Butterfield. Comparisons have also been made between the work of Dawson and Max Weber. Both employ a metahistorical approach to their subjects, and their subjects themselves bear similarities; namely, the influence of religion on aspects of western culture.

== Works ==
=== Books ===
- The Age of the Gods (1928). Reissued by the Catholic University of America Press (2012)
- Progress and Religion: An Historical Inquiry (1929). Reissued by the Catholic University of America Press (2001)
- Christianity and the New Age (1931)
- The Making of Europe: An Introduction to the History of European Unity. London: Sheed and Ward, 1932. Reissued by the Catholic University of America Press, 2003.
- The Spirit of the Oxford Movement (1933)
- Enquiries into Religion and Culture (1933). Reissued by the Catholic University of America Press (2009)
- Medieval Religion and Other Essays (1934)
- Religion and the Modern State (1936)
- Beyond Politics (1939)
- The Claims of Politics (1939)
- The Judgment of the Nations (1942). Reissued by the Catholic University of America Press (2011)
- Gifford Lectures 1947–49
  - Religion and Culture (1948) ISBN 0-404-60498-6
  - Religion and the Rise of Western Culture (1950) ISBN 0-385-42110-9
- Understanding Europe (1952). Reissued by the Catholic University of America Press (2009)
- Medieval Essays (1954). Reissued by the Catholic University of America Press (2002)
- Mongol Mission: Narratives and Letters of the Franciscan Missionaries in Mongolia and China in the Thirteenth and Fourteenth Centuries (1955). Republished in 1966 as Mission to Asia.
- Dynamics of World History (1957). Edited by John J. Mulloy et al. Reissued by the Intercollegiate Studies Institute (2002).
- The Movement of World Revolution (1959)
- Progress and Religion: An Historical Enquiry (1960) with others Reissued by the Catholic University of America Press (2001)
- The Historic Reality of Christian Culture (1960)
- The Crisis of Western Education: With Specific Programs for the Study of Christian Culture (1961). Reissued by the Catholic University of America Press (2010)
- The Dividing of Christendom (1965)
- The Formation of Christendom (1967)
- The Gods of Revolution (1972)
- Religion and World History: A Selection from the Works of Christopher Dawson (1975)
- Christianity and European Culture: Selections from the Work of Christopher Dawson edited by Gerald J. Russello. Reissued by the Catholic University of America Press (1998)
