= Russell Kirk =

American political theorist and writer (1918–1994)

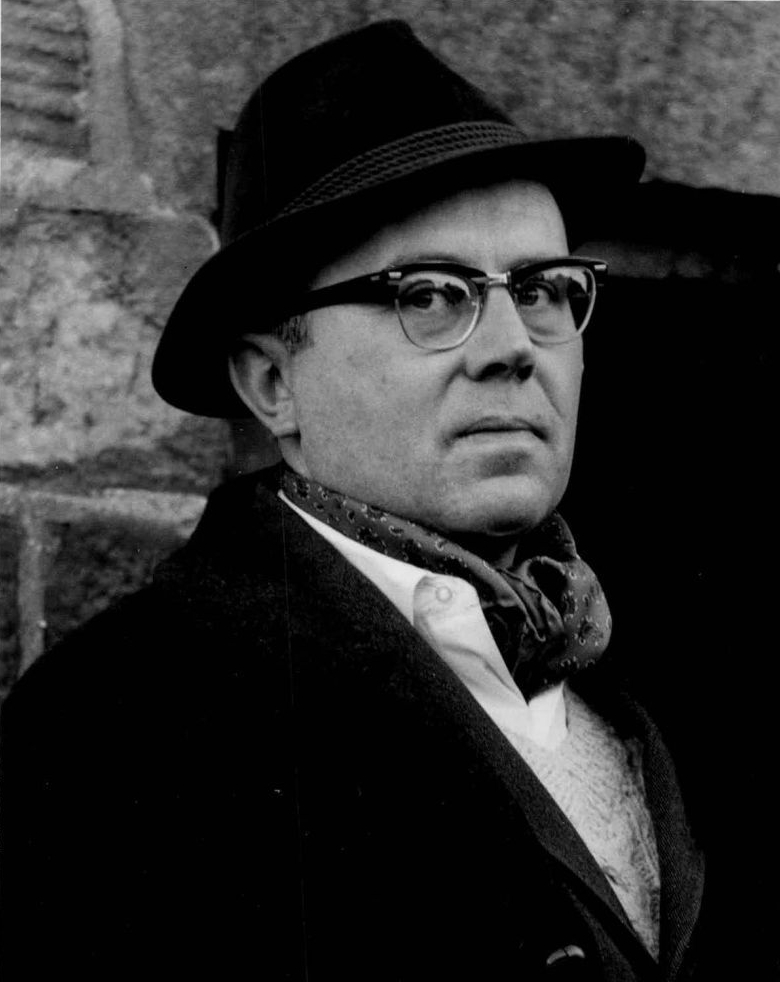
- Kirk in 1962
- Born: Russell Amos Kirk; October 19, 1918; Plymouth, Michigan, U.S.
- Died: April 29, 1994 (aged 75); Mecosta, Michigan, U.S.
- Spouse: Annette Courtemanche (m. 1964)
- Children: 4

Education
- Education: Michigan State University (BA); Duke University (MA); University of St Andrews (DLitt)

Philosophical work
- Era: 20th-century philosophy
- School: Traditionalist conservatism American conservatism Christian humanism
- Main interests: Politics, history, fiction
- Notable works: The Conservative Mind; Roots of American Order
- Website: kirkcenter.org

Russell Amos Kirk (October 19, 1918 – April 29, 1994) was an American political philosopher, moralist, historian, social critic, literary critic, lecturer, author, and novelist who influenced 20th-century American conservatism. In 1953, he authored The Conservative Mind, which outlined and traced the development of socio-conservative thought in the works of Anglo-American tradition, such as those of Edmund Burke. The book helped establish the intellectual framework for a religious and humanistic understanding of conservatism in the postwar era. Kirk was the chief proponent of traditionalist conservatism.

Scholars have identified Kirk as an important twentieth-century proponent of Christian humanism, placing him in conversation with figures such as T. S. Eliot, Christopher Dawson, and Romano Guardini.

He was also an accomplished author of Gothic and ghost story fiction.

In 1953, Clinton Rossiter said that thanks to Kirk, "the so-called 'new conservatism' of the postwar period takes on new substance and meaning". In 2013, Alfred Regnery called The Conservative Mind "the catalyst that began the transformation of a band of disparate conservative critics into the political, cultural, and intellectual force that it is today."

== Early life and education ==
Kirk was born in Plymouth, Michigan, on October 19, 1918, the son of Russell Andrew Kirk, a railroad engineer, and Marjorie Pierce Kirk. Kirk attended Michigan State University, where he received a Bachelor of Arts, and Duke University, where he was awarded a Master of Arts.

During World War II, Kirk served in the United States Armed Forces and corresponded with Isabel Paterson, a libertarian writer who helped to shape his early political thought. After reading Our Enemy, the State by Albert Jay Nock, Kirk engaged in a similar correspondence with Nock. Following the end of World War II, Kirk attended University of St Andrews in Scotland, where, in 1953, he became the university's first American to be awarded a Doctor of Letters. Kirk "laid out a post-World War II program for conservatives by warning them, 'A handful of individuals, some of them quite unused to moral responsibilities on such a scale, made it their business to extirpate the populations of Nagasaki and Hiroshima; we must make it our business to curtail the possibility of such snap decisions.'"

== Career ==
=== Michigan State University ===
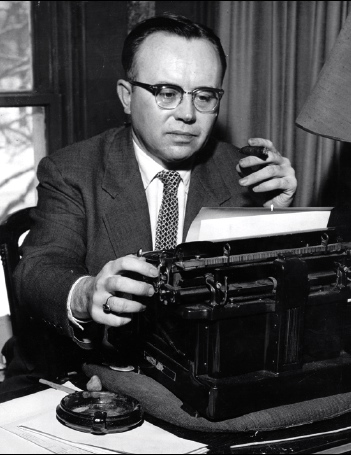
Kirk at his typewriter in the 1950s

After obtaining his degree at the University of St. Andrews, Kirk secured an academic position at Michigan State University, his alma mater. He resigned in 1953, after growing disenchanted with the rapid growth in student number and emphasis on intercollegiate athletics and technical training at the expense of the traditional liberal arts. He subsequently referred to Michigan State as "Cow College" or "Behemoth University", and later wrote that academic political scientists and sociologists were "as a breed—dull dogs".

Following the success of The Conservative Mind (1953), Kirk resigned from his teaching position and relocated to Mecosta, Michigan, where he established himself as an independent writer and lecturer. From Mecosta, Kirk maintained an extensive publishing and speaking career, producing a steady body of work in political theory, cultural criticism, history, and humane letters over several decades.

=== Editor and author ===
After leaving Michigan State, Kirk moved permanently to the village of Mecosta, Michigan. From there he exerted his influence on American politics and intellectual life through many books and articles, as well as the syndicated newspaper column, which was published for 13 years. In his entire career he published nearly 3,000 newspaper columns, hundreds of essays and books reviews, and over 30 books.

==== The Conservative Mind ====
In 1953, Kirk authored The Conservative Mind, (Note: It went into 7 editions, the later ones with the subtitle "From Burke to Eliot". Regnery Publishing. 7th edition (2001). ISBN 0-89526-171-5) the published version of Kirk's doctoral dissertation. It contributed materially to the 20th century Burke revival, drawing attention to:

- Conservative statesmen, including John Adams, Alexander Hamilton, Fisher Ames, George Canning, John C. Calhoun, John Randolph of Roanoke, Joseph de Maistre, Benjamin Disraeli, and Arthur Balfour;
- Conservative authors, including Samuel Taylor Coleridge, Sir Walter Scott, Alexis de Tocqueville, James Fenimore Cooper, Nathaniel Hawthorne, James Russell Lowell, George Gissing, George Santayana, Robert Frost, T. S. Eliot, and G.K. Chesterton.
- British and American authors, including Fisher Ames, John Randolph of Roanoke, Orestes Brownson, John Henry Newman, Walter Bagehot, Henry James Sumner Maine, William Edward Hartpole Lecky, Edwin Lawrence Godkin, William Hurrell Mallock, Leslie Stephen, Albert Venn Dicey, Robert Nisbet, Paul Elmer More, and Irving Babbitt.

==== Journals ====
Kirk wrote for many publications, especially for three U.S.-based conservative journals, National Review, which he helped found in 1955 and contributed a column for 25 years; Modern Age, which he helped found in 1957 and edited from 1957 to 1959; and the University Bookman, which he founded in 1960 and edited until his death.

==== Other works ====
Kirk's other important books include Eliot and His Age: T. S. Eliot's Moral Imagination in the Twentieth Century (1972), The Roots of American Order (1974), and the autobiographical Sword of the Imagination: Memoirs of a Half Century of Literary Conflict (1995). In addition to his works of cultural criticism and intellectual history, Kirk also wrote extensively on education, addressing the role of moral formation, liberal learning, and the transmission of tradition in books and essays such as Decadence and Renewal in the Higher Learning (1978). As was the case with his hero Edmund Burke, Kirk became known for the prose style of his intellectual and polemical writings, which emphasized historical continuity, moral imagination, and literary expression.

==== Fiction ====
Beyond his scholarly achievements, Kirk was talented both as an oral storyteller and as an author of genre fiction, most notably in his telling of ghost stories in the tradition of Sheridan Le Fanu, M. R. James, Oliver Onions, and H. Russell Wakefield. He also wrote other admired and much-anthologized works that are variously classified as horror, fantasy, science fiction, and political satire. These earned him plaudits from fellow creative writers as varied and distinguished as T. S. Eliot, Robert Aickman, Madeleine L'Engle, and Ray Bradbury.

Kirk's body of fiction, encompassing three novels and 22 short stories, was written amid a busy career as prolific non-fiction writer, editor, and speaker. Like other speculative fiction authors G. K. Chesterton, C. S. Lewis, and J. R. R. Tolkien, each of whom only wrote non-fiction for their day jobs, there are conservative undercurrents, social, cultural, religious, and political, to Kirk's fiction. In 1984, Kirk described the purpose of his fictional stories:

The political ferocity of our age is sufficiently dismaying: men of letters need not conjure up horrors worse than those suffered during the past decade by the Cambodians and Ugandans, Afghans and Ethiopians. What I have attempted, rather, are experiments in the moral imagination. Readers will encounter elements of parable and fable...some clear premise is about the character of human existence...a healthy concept of the character of evil...

His first novel, Old House of Fear (1961, 1965), was written in a self-consciously Gothic vein. The plot is concerned with an American assigned by his employer to a bleak locale in rural Scotland—the same country where Kirk had attended graduate school. This was Kirk's most commercially successful and critically acclaimed fictional work, doing much to sustain him financially in subsequent years. Old House of Fear was inspired by the novels of John Buchan and Kirk's own Scottish heritage. The story of Old House of Fear concerns an young American, Hugh Logan, a World War II veteran who is both brave and sensitive, sent to buy Carnglass, a remote island in the Hebrides. Upon reaching the island, he discovers that the island's owner, Lady MacAskival and her beautiful adopted daughter Mary are being held hostage by foreign spies, who are presumably working for the Soviet Union, out to sabotage a nearby NATO base. The leader of the spies is Dr. Jackman, an evil genius and nihilist intent upon wrecking a world that failed to acknowledge his greatness and whom reviewers noted was a much more vividly drawn character than the hero Logan. Dr. Jackman appears to be a prototype of Kirk's best known character, Manfred Arcane, with the only difference being the former has no values while the latter does.

His later novels include A Creature of the Twilight (1966), a dark comedy satirizing postcolonial African politics; and Lord of the Hollow Dark (1979, 1989), set in Scotland, which explores the great evil inhabiting a haunted house. A Creature of the Twilight concerns the adventures in Africa of a reactionary, romantic mercenary Mandred Arcane, a self-proclaimed mixture of Machiavelli and Sir Lancelot, who is an anachronistic survival of the Victorian Age who does not belong in the modern world and yet defiantly still exists, making him the "creature of the twilight". Kirk has Arcane write his pseudo-memoir in a consciously Victorian style to underline that he does not belong in the 1960s. Arcane is both a dapper intellectual and a hardened man of action, an elderly man full of an unnatural vigor, who is hired by the son of the assassinated Sultan to put down a Communist rebellion in the fictional African nation of Hamnegri, which he does despite overwhelming odds. In 1967, Kirk published a short story "Belgrummo's Hell" about a clever art thief who unwisely tries to rob the estate of the ancient Scottish warlock, Lord Belgrummo, who is later revealed to be Arcane's father. In another short story published in the same collection, "The Peculiar Demesne of Archvicar Gerontion" concerned a wizard, Archvicar Gerontion, who tries to kill Arcane by casting deadly spells.

The Lord of the Hollow Dark is set at the same Belgrummo estate first encountered in "Belgrummo's Hell" where an evil cult led by the Aleister Crowley-like character Apollinax have assembled to secure for themselves the "Timeless Moment" of eternal sexual pleasure by sacrificing two innocents, an young woman named Marina and her infant daughter in an ancient warren called the Weem under the Belgrummo Estate. Assisting Apollinax is Archvicar Gerontion, who is really Arcane in disguise. Inspired by the novels of H.P. Lovecraft, Kirk in the Lord of the Hollow Dark has Arcane survive a "horrid chthonian pilgrimage" as he faces dark supernatural forces, confronts his own family's history of evil, and refuses the appeal of a "seductive, hubristic immorality". The novel concludes with Arcane's own definition of a true "Timeless Moment" which he states: "it comes from faith, from hope, from charity; from having your work in the world; from the happiness of the people you love; or simply as a gift of grace". During his lifetime, Kirk also oversaw the publication of three collections which together encompassed all his short stories. (Three more such collections have been published posthumously, but those only reprint stories found in the earlier volumes. One such posthumous collection, Ancestral Shadows: An Anthology of Ghostly Tales, was edited by his student, friend, and collaborator Vigen Guroian, and includes both an essay by Kirk on 'ghostly tales' and Guroian's own analysis of the stories as well as Kirk's motives in writing them.) Many of Kirk's short stories, especially the ghost stories, were set in either Scotland or in the rural parts of his home state of Michigan.

Among his novels and stories, certain characters tend to recur, enriching the already considerable unity and resonance of his fictional canon. Though—through their themes and prose-style—Kirk's fiction and nonfiction works are complementary, many readers of the one have not known of his work in the other.

Having begun to write fiction fairly early in his career, Kirk ceased fiction writing after the early 1980s, while continuing his non-fiction writing and research through his last year of life.

In 1982, The Portable Conservative Reader, which Kirk edited, included writings by many of the conservatives Kirk featured in The Conservative Mind.

=== The Heritage Foundation ===
Kirk later was appointed a distinguished fellow at the Heritage Foundation, a Washington-based conservative think tank, where he gave many lectures. (Note: Many are published in his The Politics of Prudence (1993) and Redeeming the Time (1998).) For a number of years Kirk taught one semester a year at Hillsdale College, where he was distinguished visiting professor of humanities. He was also a contributor to Chronicles magazine.

=== Presidential Citizens Medal ===
In 1989, Kirk was presented with the Presidential Citizens Medal by President Ronald Reagan.

== Personal life ==
In 1963, Kirk converted to Catholicism and married Annette Courtemanche; they had four daughters. She and Kirk became known for their hospitality, welcoming many political, philosophical, and literary figures in their Mecosta, Michigan house, known as "Piety Hill", and giving shelter to political refugees, hoboes, and others. Their Michigan home, which also became the site of seminars on conservative thought for university students, now houses the Russell Kirk Center for Cultural Renewal. After his conversion to Catholicism, Kirk was a founding board member of Una Voce America.

Kirk was received into the Catholic Church in 1964, a decision he later described as the culmination of a long intellectual and spiritual journey rather than a sudden conversion. Raised in a culturally Protestant environment, he was drawn over time to Catholicism through his engagement with Christian theology and the writings of authors such as T. S. Eliot and Christopher Dawson, whom he regarded as exemplars of a religiously grounded moral imagination. Kirk maintained that his conversion deepened and clarified themes already present in his thought—particularly his emphasis on moral order, tradition, and the transcendent—while cautioning against reducing religious belief to a political instrument.

== Death ==
On April 29, 1994, Kirk died from heart failure at his home in Mecosta, at age 75.

== Philosophy and ideals ==
Kirk developed six canons of conservatism, which Gerald J. Russello described as including:

1. A belief in a transcendent order, which Kirk described variously as based in tradition, divine revelation, or natural law;
2. An affection for the "variety and mystery" of human existence;
3. A conviction that society requires orders and classes that emphasize "natural" distinctions;
4. A belief that property and freedom are closely linked;
5. A faith in custom, convention, and prescription, and
6. A recognition that innovation must be tied to existing traditions and customs, which entails a respect for the political value of prudence.

Kirk said that Christianity and Western Civilization are "unimaginable apart from one another" and that "all culture arises out of religion. When religious faith decays, culture must decline, though often seeming to flourish for a space after the religion which has nourished it has sunk into disbelief."

Kirk declined to drive, calling cars "mechanical Jacobins", and would have nothing to do with television and what he called "electronic computers".

Kirk did not always maintain a stereotypically conservative voting record. In the 1944 presidential election, for instance, Kirk voted for Norman Thomas, the Socialist Party of America candidate as opposed to choosing between incumbent Franklin D. Roosevelt and the Republican challenger Thomas E. Dewey. In the 1976 presidential election, he voted for Eugene McCarthy. In 1992 he supported Pat Buchanan's primary challenge to incumbent George H. W. Bush, serving as state chair of the Buchanan campaign in Michigan.

=== Gulf War ===
Kirk was highly critical of Republican militarism, arguing in 1992 that U.S. president George H. W. Bush embarked upon "a radical course of intervention in the region of the Persian Gulf" in leading American engagement in the Gulf War, following Saddam Hussein and Iraq's invasion and occupation of Kuwait in August 1990. In April 1992, in an address to the Heritage Foundation, Kirk said:

Presidents Woodrow Wilson, Franklin Roosevelt, and Lyndon Johnson were enthusiasts for American domination of the world. Now George Bush appears to be emulating those eminent Democrats. When the Republicans, once upon a time, nominated for the presidency a "One World" candidate, Wendell Willkie, they were sadly trounced. In general, Republicans throughout the twentieth century have been advocates of prudence and restraint in the conduct of foreign affairs.

Unless the Bush administration abruptly reverses its fiscal and military course, I suggest, the Republican Party must lose its former good repute for frugality, and become the party of profligate expenditure, "butter and guns." And public opinion would not long abide that. Nor would America's world influence and America's remaining prosperity.

Yet presidents of the United States must not be encouraged to make Perpetual War for Perpetual Peace, nor to fancy that they can establish a New World Order through eliminating dissenters. In the second century before Christ, the Romans generously liberated the Greek city-states from the yoke of Macedonia. But it was not long before the Romans felt it necessary to impose upon those quarrelsome Greeks a domination more stifling to Hellenic freedom and culture than ever Macedon had been. It is a duty of the Congress of the United States to see that great American Caesars do not act likewise.

=== Libertarianism ===
Kirk supported Burkean conservatism, based on the writings and philosophy of Edmund Burke, which embraced tradition, political philosophy, belles lettres, and strong religious faith. Especially in his later years, he was an opponent of libertarianism and free market economic reasoning, though he made little reference of these positions in The Conservative Mind.

In a 1981 article for Modern Age, Kirk, paraphrasing T. S. Eliot, called libertarians "chirping sectaries." Kirk added that conservatives and libertarians share opposition to "collectivism," "the totalist state," and "bureaucracy", but otherwise have "nothing" in common. He called the libertarian movement "an ideological clique forever splitting into sects still smaller and odder, but rarely conjugating." He said a line of division exists between believers in "some sort of transcendent moral order" and "utilitarians admitting no transcendent sanctions for conduct." He included libertarians in the latter category. Kirk, therefore, questioned the "fusionism" between libertarians and traditional conservatives that marked much of post-World War II conservatism in the United States. Kirk also argued that libertarians "bear no authority, temporal or spiritual" and do not "venerate ancient beliefs and customs, or the natural world, or [their] country, or the immortal spark in [their] fellow men."

In an April 1988 lecture at the Heritage Foundation, Kirk's praised classical liberals, saying that he agreed with them on "ordered liberty" and shared "common cause with regular conservatives against the menace of democratic despotism and economic collectivism."

Tibor Machan, an Auburn University philosophy professor, responded, defending libertarianism in response to Kirk's original Heritage Lecture. Machan argued that the right of individual sovereignty is perhaps most worthy of conserving from the American political heritage, and that when conservatives themselves talk about preserving some tradition, they cannot at the same time claim a disrespectful distrust of the individual human mind, of rationalism itself.

=== Neoconservatism ===
In the 1980s, Kirk grew disenchanted with American neoconservatives. In 2004, Chronicles editor Scott Richert wrote:

[One line] helped define the emerging struggle between neoconservatives and paleoconservatives. "Not seldom has it seemed," Kirk declared, "as if some eminent Neoconservatives mistook Tel Aviv for the capital of the United States." A few years later, in another Heritage Foundation speech, Kirk repeated that line verbatim. In the wake of the Gulf War, which he had opposed, he clearly understood that those words carried even greater meaning.

Kirk said that neoconservatives were "often clever ... seldom wise." Midge Decter, a Jewish director of the Committee for the Free World and wife of neoconservative writer Norman Podhoretz, called Kirk's description of neoconservatives "a bloody outrage, a piece of antisemitism by Kirk that impugns the loyalty of neoconservatives." (Note: She claimed Kirk "said people like my husband and me put the interest of Israel before the interest of the United States, that we have a dual loyalty.") Decter told The New Republic that, "it's this notion of a Christian civilization. You have to be part of it or you're not really fit to conserve anything. That's an old line and it's very ignorant."

Samuel T. Francis called Kirk's "Tel Aviv" remark "a wisecrack about the slavishly pro-Israel sympathies among neoconservatives." He described Decter's response as untrue, "reckless" and "vitriolic." Furthermore, he argued that such a denunciation "always plays into the hands of the left, which is then able to repeat the charges and claim conservative endorsement of them.

=== South Africa ===
In a National Review column on March 9, 1965, "One Man, One Vote' in South Africa", Kirk wrote that the U.S. Supreme Court's jurisprudence on voting "will work mischief—much injuring, rather than fulfilling, the responsible democracy for which Tocqueville hoped," but in the case of South Africa "this degradation of the democratic dogma, if applied, would bring anarchy and the collapse of civilization." Kirk wrote that "the 'European' element [makes] South Africa the only 'modern' and prosperous African country." He added that "Bantu political domination [of South Africa] would be domination by witch doctors (still numerous and powerful) and reckless demagogues" and that "Bantu and Coloreds and Indians must feel that they have some political voice in the South African commonwealth."

== Influence ==
According to Alfred S. Regnery, "For an unknown author writing about an unpopular subject, Kirk received an astounding response. The New York Times review by Gordon Chalmers, president of Kenyon College, said Kirk was “as relentless as his enemies, Karl Marx and Harold Laski, considerably more temperate and scholarly, and in passages of this very readable book, brilliant and even eloquent.” Clinton Rossiter hailed Kirk's book as "one of the most valuable contributions to intellectual history of the past decade," whose "scholarship is manifestly of the highest order." In it, he said, "the so-called 'new conservatism' of the postwar period takes on new substance and meaning." (Note: Quoted in.)

Bradley J. Birzer, a Hillsdale College history professor, argues that Kirk was immensely influential in inspiring the modern conservative movement, but not many of his followers agreed with his unusual approach to the history of conservatism. As summarized by reviewer Drew Maciag:

As Birzer's study demonstrates, Kirk's understanding of conservatism was so unique, idiosyncratic, transcendental, elitist, and in certain respects premodern and European, that it bore little resemblance to political conservatism in the United States. Conservative Mind successfully launched an intellectual challenge to postwar liberalism, but the variety of conservatism Kirk preferred found few takers, even within the American Right.

Harry Jaffa, a student of Leo Strauss, wrote, "Kirk was a poor Burke scholar. Burke's attack on metaphysical reasoning related only to modern philosophy's attempt to eliminate skeptical doubt from its premises and hence from its conclusions."

Gerald J. Russello argued that Kirk adapted what 19th century Orestes Brownson, an American Catholic writer, called "territorial democracy" to articulate a version of federalism that was based on premises that differ in part from those of the founders and other conservatives. Kirk further believed that territorial democracy could reconcile the tension between treating the states as mere provinces of the central government, and as autonomous political units independent of Washington. Finally, territorial democracy allowed Kirk to set out a theory of individual rights grounded in the particular historical circumstances of the United States, while rejecting a universal conception of such rights.

In addition to bringing public attention to Anglo-American conservative principles, Kirk described his perception of liberal ideals in the first chapter. Kirk identified these ideals as the perfectibility of man, hostility towards tradition, rapid change in economic and political systems, and the secularization of government.
