= List of Western fiction authors =

This is a list of some notable authors in the Western fiction genre.

Note that some writers listed below have also written in other genres.

== A ==
- Edward Abbey (1927–1989)
- Maria Dolores Acevedo (1932-1998)
- Andy Adams (1859–1934)
- William Lacey Amy (1877-1962)
- Rudolfo Anaya (1937–2020)

== B ==
- Todhunter Ballard (1903–1980)
- S. Omar Barker (1894–1985)
- Rex Beach (1877–1949)
- James Warner Bellah (1899–1976)
- Don Bendell (born 1947)
- Tom W. Blackburn (1913–1992)
- James Carlos Blake (1943–2025)
- William Blinn (1937–2020)
- Stephen Bly (1944–2011)
- Frank Bonham (1914–1988)
- Allan R. Bosworth (1901–1986)
- Peter Bowen (1945–2020)
- B.M. Bower (1871–1940), (pseudonym of Bertha "Muzzy" Sinclair)
- Leigh Brackett (1915–1978)
- Max Brand (1892–1944), (pseudonym of Frederick Schiller Faust)
- Lyle Brandt (1951–2021), (pseudonym of Michael Newton)
- Peter Brandvold, (pseudonym, Frank Leslie)
- Matt Braun (1932–2016)
- Dee Brown (1908–2002)
- Anthony Burgess (1917–1993)
- Walter Noble Burns (1866–1932)

== C ==
- Daniel Carlson (born 1963)
- David Wynford Carnegie (1871–1900)
- Forrest Carter (1925–1979)
- David F. Case (1937–2018)
- Frank Castle (1910-1994)
- Willa Cather (1873–1947)
- Robert W. Chambers (Robert William Chambers) (1865–1933)
- A.M. Chisholm (1871–1960)
- Walter van Tilburg Clark (1909–1971)
- Walt Coburn (1889–1971)
- Don Coldsmith (1926–2009)
- Jackson Cole, (pseudonym of Peter B. Germano)
- Ralph Compton (1934–1999)
- Robert J. Conley (1940–2014)
- Will Cook (William Everett Cook) (1921–1964)
- Courtney Ryley Cooper (1886–1940)
- James Fenimore Cooper (1789–1851)
- Barry Cord, (pseudonym of Peter B. Germano)
- Ralph Cotton
- William R. Cox (1901–1988)
- Bill Crider (1941–2018)
- Elizabeth Crook (born 1959)
- James Oliver Curwood (1878–1926)

== D ==
- Sandra Dallas
- H. L. Davis (1894–1960)
- John Deacon
- J. Frank Dobie (1888–1964)
- Gary Dobbs (born 1965)
- Ivan Doig (1939–2015)
- Harry Sinclair Drago

== E ==
- J. T. Edson (1928–2014)
- Edward S. Ellis (Edward Sylvester Ellis) (1840–1916)
- Louise Erdrich
- Loren D. Estleman (born 1952)
- Wade Everett, (pseudonym of Will Cook, Giles A. Lutz)

== F ==
- Edna Ferber (1885–1968)
- Norman A. Fox (1911–1960)
- Ron Franscell (born 1957)

== G ==
- Brian Garfield (1939–2018)
- Kathleen O'Neal Gear (born 1954)
- W. Michael Gear (born 1955)
- George G. Gilman, (pseudonym of Terry Williams Harknett) (1936–2019)
- Jean Giraud (1938–2012)
- Arthur Henry Gooden (1879–1971)
- Edward Gorman (1941–2016)
- Jackson Gregory (1882–1943)
- Dorien Grey
- Zane Grey (1872–1939)
- James J. Griffin (born 1949)
- Jesse Edward Grinstead (1866–1948)
- Fred Grove (1913–2008)
- Frank Gruber (1904–1969)
- A.B. Guthrie, Jr. (1901–1991)

== H ==
- Derek Haas (born 1970)
- Mel Hague
- William Wister Haines (1908–1989)
- Oakley Hall (1920–2008)
- Donald Hamilton (1916–2006)
- Ron Hansen (novelist) (born 1947)
- Bret Harte (1836–1902)
- Kent Haruf (1943–2014)
- Ernest Haycox (1899–1950)
- Will Henry (Henry Wilson Allen) (1912–1991)
- Tony Hillerman (1925–2008)
- Lee Hoffman (1932–2007)
- Robert E. Howard (1906–1936)
- Clair Huffaker (1926–1990)

== I ==
- Laura Ingalls Wilder (1867–1957)
- Washington Irving (1783–1859)

== J ==
- Will James, (1892–1942)
- Paulette Jiles (1943–2025)
- Craig Johnson (born 1961)
- Dorothy M. Johnson (1905–1984)
- Terry C. Johnston (1947–2001)
- William W. Johnstone (1938–2004)
- E.Z.C. Judson, (pseudonym of Ned Buntline)

== K ==
- Jim Kane (pseudonym of Peter B. Germano)
- Mike Kearby
- Elmer Kelton (1926–2009)
- Charles King (1844–1933)

== L ==
- Oliver La Farge (1901–1963)
- Louis L'Amour (1908–1988)
- Marcial Lafuente Estefanía (1903–1984), (his pen name, M.L. Estefanía, was later borrowed by his sons)
- Joe R. Lansdale (born 1951)
- Elmore Leonard (1925–2013)
- Chuck Lewis (born 1963)
- Tom Lin (born c. 1996)
- Jake Logan (author)
- Milton Lott (1919–1996)
- Giles A. Lutz (1910–1982)
- Francis Lynde (1856–1930)
- Stan Lynde

== M ==
- Milo Manara (born 1945)
- Kat Martin
- Richard Matheson (1926–2013)
- Karl May (1842–1912)
- Ardath Mayhar (1930–2012)
- Cormac McCarthy (1933-2023)
- Lucile Saunders McDonald (1898–1992)
- Michael McGarrity (born 1939)
- Thomas McGuane (born 1939)
- Larry McMurtry (1936–2021)
- Leonard Frank Meares
- Joaquin Miller (1837–1913)
- Balduin Möllhausen (1825–1905)
- Clarence Edward Mulford (1883–1956)

== N ==
- John D. Nesbitt (born 1948)
- Frederick Nolan (1931–2022)
- Frank Norris (1870–1902)
- Andre Norton (1912–2005)
- Nelson Nye (Nelson C.(Coral) Nye) (1907–1997)

== O ==
- Chad Oliver (1928–1993)
- T.V. Olsen (Theodore V. Olsen) (1932–1993)
- Frank O'Rourke (1906–1989)
- Wayne D. Overholser (1906–1996)

== P ==
- Lauran Paine (1916–2001)
- Robert B. Parker (1932–2010)
- Lewis B. Patten (1915–1981)
- Charles Portis (1933–2020)
- Bill Pronzini (born 1943)
- Annie Proulx (born 1935)

== R ==
- William MacLeod Raine (1871–1954)
- Robert J Randisi (1951–2024)
- James Reasoner (born 1953)
- John H. Reese (1910–1981), (pseudonyms Eddie Abbott, John Jo Carpenter, Camford Cheavly, Camford Sheaveley & Camford Sheavely (chron.))
- Conrad Richter (1890–1968)
- Lucia St. Clair Robson (born 1942)
- Dana Fuller Ross (born 1953)
- Zola Helen Ross (1912–1989)
- James L. Rubel (1894-1960)

== S ==
- Jeff Sadler (1943–2005), (pseudonym of Geoffrey Sadler; also wrote under the pen name Wes Calhoun).
- M.H. Salmon (1945-2019)
- Jack Schaefer (1907–1991)
- Charles Alden Seltzer (1875-1942)
- Jon Sharpe
- Luke Short (1908–1975), (pseudonym of Frederick D. Glidden)
- Jack Slade (publisher house name, pseudonym of Peter B. Germano and others)
- Frank H. Spearman (1859–1937)
- Kai Starr (born 1964)
- John Steinbeck (1902–1968)
- Wallace Stegner (1909–1993)
- Louis J. Stellman (1877–1961)
- Manning Lee Stokes (1911–1976), writing as Ford Worth
- Charles S. Strong
- Gary Svee (1943–2019)
- Glendon Swarthout (1918–1992)

== T ==
- Robert Lewis Taylor (1912–1998)
- David Thompson
- Harlan Howard Thompson
- Nye Tredgold
- Clay Turner, (pseudonym of Peter B. Germano)
- Mark Twain (1835–1910)

== V ==
- Robert Vaughan
- Gerald Vizenor, (born 1934)

== W ==
- Dale L. Walker (1935–2015)
- Charles Marquis Warren (1912–1990)
- Larry Watson (writer) (born 1947)
- Richard S. Wheeler (1935–2019)
- Harry Whittington (1915–1989)
- G. Clifton Wisler (1950–2006)
- Owen Wister (1860–1938)
- Richard Wormser (1908–1977)

== Y ==
- R.G. Yoho (born 1959)

== Z ==
- S. Craig Zahler (born 1973)

== See also ==
- Western fiction
- Western movie
- List of authors
- Western Writers of America
- Western lifestyle
