= Spur Award for Best Western Novel =

Literary prize given annually by the Western Writers of America

The Spur Award for Best Western Novel is a prize given by the Western Writers of America as part of the annual Spur Awards.

The category was introduced in 1953, when it was known simply as the "Novel" award. A second category for novel-length prose fiction, the Historical Novel award, was introduced in 1972. The original Novel award was renamed Western Novel in 1985, while Historical Novel became Novel of the West in 1988. This resulted in a period in which the Spur Awards included both a Best Western Novel category as well as a Best Novel of the West category. John Mort explains the distinction in his book Read the High Country: "WWA defines Westerns... in market terms. A Western novel is a 'traditional' tale of revenge, rival cattlemen at war, or settlers fighting Indians. Owen Wister's The Virginian is a famous example, as well as Louis L'Amour's Hondo. A 'novel of the West' is what's otherwise known as a historical, where characterizations are based around historical events, and historical personages such as Davy Crockett, George Armstrong Custer, and Crazy Horse become characters."

During 2000, the official Spur Award website defined both categories as "book-length novels... dependent in whole or in part on settings, characters, conditions, or customs indigenous to the American West or early frontier," the distinction being that Best Western Novel was for works "90,000 words or less" while Best Novel of the West was for works "90,000 words or more." In 2007, the Western Novel and Novel of the West categories were replaced with Best Short Novel and Best Long Novel. These categories were removed in 2014, with Best Contemporary Novel, Best Historical Novel and Best Traditional Novel being added.

== List of winners ==
- 1953 - Novel: "Lawman" by Wayne D. Overholser using the pseudonym Lee Leighton
- 1954 - Novel: "The Violent Land" by Wayne D. Overholser (2)
- 1955 - Novel: "Somewhere They Die" by L.P. Holmes
- 1956 - Novel: "High Gun" by Leslie Ernenwein
- 1957 - Novel: "Buffalo Wagons" by Elmer Kelton
- 1958 - Novel: "Short Cut to Red River" by Noel Loomis
- 1959 - Novel: "Long Run" by Nelson C. Nye
- 1960 - Novel: "The Nameless Breed by Will C. Brown
- 1961 - Novel: "The Honyocker by Giles A. Lutz
- 1962 - Novel: "Comanche Captives" by Fred Grove
- 1963 - Novel: "Follow the Free Wind" by Leigh Brackett
- 1964 - Novel: "The Trail to Ogallala" by Benjamin Capps
- 1965 - Novel: "Sam Chance" by Benjamin Capps (2)
- 1966 - Novel: "My Brother John" by Herbert R. Purdum
- 1967 - Novel: "The Valdez Horses" by Lee Hoffman
- 1968 - Novel: "Down the Long Hills" by Louis L'Amour
- 1969 - Novel: "Tragg's Choice" by Clifton Adams
- 1970 - Novel: "The Last Days of Wolf Garnett" by Clifton Adams (2)
- 1971 - Novel: "The Day the Cowboys Quit" by Elmer Kelton (2)
- 1972 - Novel: "A Killing in Kiowa" by Lewis B. Patten
- 1973 - Novel: "The Time It Never Rained" by Elmer Kelton (3)
- 1974 - Novel: "A Hanging in Sweetwater" by Stephen Overholser (son of Wayne D. Overholser)
- 1975 - Novel: "The Shootist" by Glendon Swarthout
- 1976 - Novel (tie): "The Spirit Horses" by Lou Cameron and "The Court Martial of George Armstrong Custer" by Douglas C. Jones
- 1977 - Novel: "The Great Horse Race" by Fred Grove (2)
- 1978 - Novel: "Riders To Cibola" by Norman Zollinger
- 1979 - Novel: "The Holdouts" by William Decker
- 1980 - Novel: "The Valiant Women" by Jeanne Williams
- 1981 - Novel (tie): "Eye of The Hawk" by Elmer Kelton (4) and "Horizon" by Lee Head
- 1982 - Novel: "Match Race" by Fred Grove (3)
- 1983 - Novel: "Leaving Kansas" by Frank Roderus
- 1984 - Novel: no award
- 1985 - Western Novel: "Lonesome Dove" by Larry McMurtry
- 1986 - Western Novel: "The Blind Corral" by Ralph Robert Beer
- 1987 - Western Novel: "Skinwalkers" by Tony Hillerman
- 1988 - Western Novel: "Mattie" by Judy Alter
- 1989 - Western Novel: "Fool's Coach" by Richard S. Wheeler
- 1990 - Western Novel: "Sanctuary" by Gary Svee
- 1991 - Western Novel: "Journal of the Gun Years" by Richard Matheson
- 1992 - Western Novel: "Nickajack" by Robert J. Conley
- 1993 - Western Novel: "Friends" by Charles Hackenberry
- 1994 - Western Novel: "St. Agnes' Stand" by Tom Eidson
- 1995 - Western Novel: "The Dark Island" by Robert J. Conley (2)
- 1996 - Western Novel: "Blood of Texas" by Preston Lewis (writing as Will Camp)
- 1997: W.W.A. changed the time-frame from 'year published' to 'year award presented'
- 1998 - Western Novel: "The Kiowa Verdict" by Cynthia Haseloff
- 1999 - Western Novel: "Journey of the Dead" by Loren D. Estleman
- 2000 - Western Novel: "Masterson" by Richard S. Wheeler (2)
- 2000 - Western Novel: "Summer of Pearls" by Mike Blakely
- 2001 - Western Novel: "The Gates of the Alamo" by Stephen Harrigan
- 2002 - Western Novel: "The Way of The Coyote" by Elmer Kelton (5)
- 2003 - Western Novel: "The Chili Queen" by Sandra Dallas
- 2004 - Western Novel: "I Should Be Extremely Happy In Your Company" By Brian Hall
- 2005 - Western Novel: "Buy The Chief A Cadillac" by Rick Steber
- 2006 - Western Novel (tie): "Camp Ford: A Western Story" by Johnny D. Boggs and "The Undertaker's Wife" by Loren D. Estleman (2)
- 2007 - Best Western Short Novel: "The Shape Shifter" by Tony Hillerman (2)
- 2008 - Best Western Short Novel: "Tallgrass" By Sandra Dallas (2)
- 2009 - Best Western Short Novel: "Another Man's Moccasins by Craig Johnson
- 2010 - Best Western Short Novel: "Far Bright Star" by Robert Olmstead
- 2011 - Best Western Short Novel: "Snowbound" by Richard S. Wheeler (3)
- 2012 - Best Western Short Novel: "Legacy of a Lawman" by Johnny D. Boggs (2)
- 2013 - Best Western Short Novel: "Tucker's Reckoning" by Matthew Mayo
- 2014 - Best Western Contemporary Novel: "Light of the World: A Dave Robicheaux Novel" by James Lee Burke; Best Western Historical Novel: "Silent We Stood" by Henry Chappell; Best Western Traditional Novel: "Crossing Purgatory" by Gary Schanbacher
- 2015 - Best Western Contemporary Novel: "Bad Country" by C.B. McKenzie; Best Western Historical Novel: "Wild Ran the Rivers" by James D. Crownover; Best Western Traditional Novel: "The Big Drift" by Patrick Dearen
- 2016 - Best Western Contemporary Novel: "Crazy Mountain Kiss: A Sean Stranahan Mystery" by Keith McCafferty; Best Western Historical Novel: "Paradise Sky" by Joe R. Lansdale; Best Western Traditional Novel: "The Last Midwife" by Sandra Dallas (3)
- 2017 - Best Western Contemporary Novel: "Off the Grid: A Joe Pickett Novel" by C.J. Box; (no awards were given for Best Western Historical Novel); Best Western Traditional Novel: "The Mustanger and the Lady" by Dusty Richards
- 2018 - Best Western Contemporary Novel: "Double Wide" by Leo W. Banks; Best Western Historical Novel: "The Coming" by David Osborne; Best Western Traditional Novel: "Silver City: A Novel of the American West" by Jeff Guinn
- 2019 - Best Western Contemporary Novel: "The Flicker of Old Dreams" by Susan Henderson; Best Western Historical Novel: "River of Porcupines" by G.K. Aalborg; Best Western Traditional Novel: "The Return of Kid Cooper" by Brad Smith
- 2020 - Best Western Contemporary Novel: "On Swift Horses: A Novel" by Shannon Pufahl; Best Western Historical Novel: "A Forgotten Evil" by Sheldon Russell; Best Western Traditional Novel: "Cherokee America" by Margaret Verble
- 2021 - Best Western Contemporary Novel: "Winter Counts" by David Heska Wanbli Weiden; Best Western Historical Novel: "All Things Left Wild" by James Wade; Best Western Traditional Novel: "Like Rum Drunk Angels" by Tyler Enfield
- 2022 - Best Western Contemporary Novel: "Dark Sky: A Joe Pickett Novel" by C.J. Box; Best Western Historical Novel: "Ridgeline" by Michael Punke; Best Western Traditional Novel: "The Loving Wrath of Eldon Quint" by Chase Pletts
- 2023 - Best Western Contemporary Novel: "Beasts of the Earth" by James Wade; Best Western Historical Novel: "Properties of Thirst" by Marianne Wiggins; Best Western Traditional Novel: "The Secret in the Wall: A Silver Rush Mystery" by Ann Parker
- 2024 - Best Western Contemporary Novel: "The Longmire Defense" by Craig Johnson; Best Western Historical Novel: "Death in the Tallgrass: A Young Man's Journey Through the Western Frontier" by Donald Willerton; Best Western Traditional Novel: "Aesop's Travels: A Crackerjack Tale of the Old West" by Daniel Boyd
- 2025 - Best Western Contemporary Novel: "Blue Wild Indigo" by James Jennings; Best Western Historical Novel: "Bloody Newton" by Johnny D. Boggs; Best Western Traditional Novel: "Dust Covered Lies" by Catherine M. O'Connor
- 2026 - Best Western Contemporary Novel: "Of Saints and Rivers" by Jim Logan; Best Western Historical Novel: "Arkansas Black" by Alexander Blevens; Best Western Traditional Novel: "Lost and Broken Things" by Linda Sandifer

- 12 authors have won the award on more than one occasion: Wayne D. Overholser 1953, 1954; Elmer Kelton (5): 1957, 1971, 1973, 1981, 2002; (3) each for: Fred Grove 1962, 1977, 1982; Benjamin Capps 1964, 1965; Richard S. Wheeler 1989, 2000, 2011; (2) each for: Clifton Adams 1969, 1970; Tony Hillerman 1987, 2007; Robert J. Conley 1992, 1995; Loren D. Estleman 1999, 2006; Sandra Dallas 2003, 2008, 2016; Johnny D. Boggs 2006, 2012, 2025; C.J. Box 2017, 2022; James Wade 2021, 2023.
