= Owen Wister Award =

American literary prize

Owen Wister Award is an annual award from the Western Writers of America given to lifelong contributions to the field of Western literature. Named for writer Owen Wister (The Virginian; 1902), it is given for "Outstanding Contributions to the American West".

Originally given for "best book of the year", it was expanded in 1967 to include anyone advancing Western literature.

From 1961 to 1990 it was called the Saddleman Award (sculptor Spero Anargyros; polished bronze statuette of a cowboy in Levi’s, saddle slung over his right shoulder, branding iron in his left hand ) and sponsored by Levi Strauss & Co. After Levi Strauss dropped its sponsorship, the award was retitled the Owen Wister Award for "Lifetime Achievement" in Western history and literature. From 1991 to 1994 recipients received an engraved bronze figure of a cowboy, since 1994 winners have received a bronze buffalo design on wood base from sculptor Robert H. Duffie.

== Winners ==
List of recipients of the Saddleman and Owen Wister.

=== Saddleman ===
- Saddleman honorees are:
  - 1961: Will Henry
  - 1962: Jeanne Williams
  - 1963: Fred Grove
  - 1964: Mari Sandoz
  - 1965: Benjamin Capps
  - 1966: Alvin M. Josephy, Jr.
  - 1967: S. Omar Barker
  - 1968: Nelson C. Nye
  - 1969: Frederick D. Glidden
  - 1970: John Wayne
  - 1971: Thomas Thompson
  - 1972: John Ford
  - 1973: Glenn Vernam
  - 1974: W. Foster-Harris
  - 1975: Nellie Snyder Yost
  - 1976: Dorothy M. Johnson
  - 1977: Elmer Kelton
  - 1978: A. B. Guthrie, Jr.
  - 1979: Lewis B. Patten
  - 1980: C. L. Sonnichsen
  - 1981: Louis L'Amour
  - 1982: Eve Ball
  - 1983: Bill Gulick
  - 1984: Dee Brown
  - 1985: Leon Claire Metz
  - 1986: Jack Warner Schaefer
  - 1987: Clint Eastwood
  - 1988: Don Worcester
  - 1989: Wayne D. Overholser
  - 1990: Max Evans

=== Owen Wister ===
- Owen Wister honorees are:
  - 1991: Glendon Swarthout
  - 1992: Tom Lea
  - 1993: Douglas C. Jones
  - 1994: Robert M. Utley
  - 1995: Gordon D. Shirreffs
  - 1996: David Lavender
  - 1997: José Cisneros
    No award was given in 1998.
  - 1999: Norman Zollinger
  - 2000: Dale L. Walker
  - 2001: Richard S. Wheeler
  - 2002: David Dary
  - 2003: Don Coldsmith
  - 2004: Matt Braun
  - 2005: Judy Alter
  - 2006: Andrew J. Fenady
  - 2007: John Jakes
  - 2008: Tony Hillerman
  - 2009: Elmore Leonard
  - 2010: N. Scott Momaday
  - 2011: James A. Crutchfield
  - 2012: Loren D. Estleman
  - 2013: Jory Sherman
  - 2014: Robert J. Conley
  - 2015: Winfred Blevins
  - 2016: Lucia St. Clair Robson
  - 2017: Louise Erdrich
  - 2018: Rudolfo Anaya
  - 2019: Will Bagley
  - 2020: Johnny D. Boggs
  - 2021: Kathleen O'Neal Gear and W. Michael Gear
  - 2022: Irene Bennett Brown
  - 2023: Joseph M. Marshall III
  - 2024: Quintard Taylor
