= Spur Award for Best Novel of the West =

The Spur Award for Best Novel of the West is a category formerly used by the Western Writers of America (WWA) as part of the annual Spur Awards. It was introduced for the awards' 1988 iteration, replacing the earlier category of Best Historical Novel.

For a period, the Spur Awards included a Best Western Novel category as well as a Best Novel of the West category. John Mort explains the distinction in his book Read the High Country: "WWA defines Westerns... in market terms. A Western novel is a 'traditional' tale of revenge, rival cattlemen at war, or settlers fighting Indians. Owen Wister's The Virginian is a famous example, as well as Louis L'Amour's Hondo. A 'novel of the West' is what's otherwise known as a historical, where characterizations are based around historical events, and historical personages such as Davy Crockett, George Armstrong Custer, and Crazy Horse become characters."

During 2000, the official Spurs Award website defined both categories as "book-length novels... dependent in whole or in part on settings, characters, conditions, or customs indigenous to the American West or early frontier," the distinction being that Best Western Novel was for works "90,000 words or less" while Best Novel of the West was for works "90,000 words or more."

The category was used for the final time in the 2006 iteration of the Spur Awards. After that, the awards' categorization system was reworked, with the new categories of Best Short Novel and Best Long Novel introduced. This division remained until the 2014 awards, which removed Best Short Novel and Best Long Novel and re-added Best Western Historical Novel, also introducing the new category Best Western Contemporary Novel.

== List of winners ==
1953 – 1987: Best Historical Novel

- 1953 – The Wheel and the Hearth by Lucia Moore
- 1954 – Journey by the River by John Prescott
- 1955 – No Award given
- 1956 – Generations of Men by John Clinton Hunt
- 1957 – Silver Mountain by Dan Cushman
- 1958 – The Fancher Train by Amelia Bean
- 1959 – The Buffalo Soldiers by John Prebble
- 1960 – From Where the Sun Now Stands by Will Henry
- 1961 – The Winter War by William Wister Haines
- 1962 – Moontrap by Don Berry
- 1963 – Gates of the Mountains by Will Henry (2)
- 1964 – Indian Fighter by F. F. Halloran
- 1965 – (tied) "Gold in California by Todhunter Ballard & "Mountain Man by Vardis Fisher
- 1966 – Hellfire Jackson by Garland Roark & Charles Thomas
- 1967 – The Wolf Is My Brother by Chad Oliver
- 1968 – The Red Sabbath by Lewis B. Patten
- 1969 – The White Man's Road by Benjamin Capps
- 1970-71 No Award given
- 1972 – Chiricahua by Will Henry (3)
- 1973-75 No Award given
- 1976 – The Kincaids by Matt Braun
- 1977 – Swimming Man Burning by Terrence Kilpatrick
- 1978-80 No Award given
- 1981 – Aces and Eights by Loren D. Estleman
- 1982 – Ride the Wind by Lucia St. Clair Robson
- 1983 – Sam Bass by Bryan Woolley
- 1984 – Gone the Dreams and Dancing by Douglas C. Jones
- 1985 – The Snowblind Moon by John Byrne Cooke
- 1986 – Roman by Douglas C. Jones (2)
- 1987 – Wanderer Springs by Robert Flynn

1988 – 2006: Best Novel of the West

- 1988 – The Homesman by Glendon Swarthout
- 1989 – Panther In The Sky by James Alexander Thom
- 1990 – Home Mountain by Jeanne Williams
- 1991 – The Medicine Horn by Jory Sherman
- 1992 – Slaughter by Elmer Kelton
- 1993 – Empire of Bones by Jeff Long
- 1994 – The Far Canyon by Elmer Kelton (2)
- 1995 – Stone Song: A Novel of The Life of Crazy Horse by Winfred Blevins
- 1996 – Sierra by Richard S. Wheeler
- 1997: W.W.A. changed the time-frame from 'year published' to 'year award presented'
- 1998 – Comanche Moon by Larry McMurtry
- 1999 – The All-True Travels and Adventures of Liddie Newton by Jane Smiley
- 2000 – Prophet Annie by Ellen Recknor
- 2001 – The Gates of The Alamo by Stephen Harrigan
- 2002 – The Miracle Life of Edgar Mint by Brady Udall
- 2003 – Perma Red by Debra Magpie Earling
- 2004 – So Wild a Dream by Winfred Blevins (2)
- 2005 – People of the Raven by Kathleen O'Neal Gear and W. Michael Gear
- 2006 – High Country: A Novel by Willard Wyman (which also won for Best First Novel)

2007 – 2013: Best Western Long Novel

- 2007 – The Night Journal by Elizabeth Crook
- 2008 – The God of Animals By Aryn Kyle
- 2009 – Shavetail by Thomas Cobb
- 2010 – Echoes of Glory by Robert Flynn (2)
- 2011 – Last Train from Cuernavaca by Lucia St. Clair Robson
- 2012 – Remember Ben Clayton by Stephen Harrigan
- 2013 – With Blood in Their Eyes by Thomas Cobb

2014 Onwards: Best Western Historical Novel

- 2014 – Silent We Stood by Henry Chappell
- 2015 – Wild Ran the Rivers by James D. Crownover
- 2016 – Paradise Sky by Joe R. Lansdale
- 2017 – No Award given
- 2018 – The Coming by David Osborne
- 2019 – River of Porcupines by G.K. Aalborg
- 2020 – A Forgotten Evil by Sheldon Russell
- 2021 – All Things Left Wild by James Wade
- 2022 – Ridgeline by Michael Punke
- 2023 – Beasts of the Earth by James Wade
- 2024 – Death in the Tallgrass: A Young Man’s Journey Through the Western Frontier by Donald Willerton
- Only six authors have won it on more than one occasion: Will Henry (3): 1960, 1963, 1972; (2) each for: Win Blevins 1995, 2004; Robert Flynn 1987, 2010; Douglas C. Jones 1984, 1986; Elmer Kelton 1992, 1994; James Wade 2021, 2023.
