= David Heska Wanbli Weiden =

American author

Weiden at the 2026 Texas Book Festival.

David Heska Wanbli Weiden [deɪvɪd hɛskɛn wɒnbliː waɪdɛn] is a Lakota American author of crime and thriller novels and a professor of political science at Metropolitan State University of Denver. His debut novel, Winter Counts, won an Anthony Award, Lefty Award, ITW Thriller Award, Barry Award, Macavity Award, and Spur Award.

== Life ==
Weiden grew up in the Swansea/Elyria neighborhood of Denver, Colorado. As an enrolled member of the Sicangu Lakota Nation, he spent summers at the Rosebud Indian Reservation in South Dakota.

A first-generation college student, Weiden received a Bachelor of Arts from the University of Colorado Boulder and a Juris Doctor degree from University of Denver's Sturm College of Law. After practicing law for several years, he decided to pursue academia, earning a PhD in political science from the University of Texas at Austin.

After receiving his doctorate, he taught at Hofstra University, Illinois State University, and the United States Naval Academy. Following the birth of his children, he decided he wanted to devote time and energy to writing creatively, so in 2011, he began a Master of Fine Arts (MFA) degree at Vermont College of Fine Arts, later transferring to the Institute of American Indian Arts.

He is a tenured professor of Native American studies and political science at Metropolitan State University of Denver. His academic work focuses on Native American issues and he provides legal assistance to various Native American organizations. He has been an instructor in the MFA programs at Cedar Crest College and Regis University. In 2022, he served as a mentor for PEN America's Emerging Writers program.

Weiden lives in Denver with his family.

== Awards and honors ==
Weiden has received two MacDowell Fellowships (2018, 2022) and the PEN America Writing for Justice Fellowship (2018). He has also been a Ragdale Foundation Resident in Fiction and a Tin House Scholar (2019).

His debut novel Winter Counts was named one of the best crime novels of the year by The Guardian, NPR, and Publishers Weekly. It was also a New York Times Editors' Choice selection in October 2020.

Awards
Year	Title	Award	Result	Ref.
2014	"Sourtoe"	Tribal College Journal Fiction Contest	Winner	
2018	"Carlisle Longings"	PRISM International Creative Nonfiction Prize	Longlist	
2019	Winter Counts	Shamus Award for Best First PI Novel	Finalist	
2020	Spotted Tail	Spur Award for Best Western Juvenile Nonfiction	Winner	
2020	Winter Counts	Goodreads Choice Award for Debut Novel	Nominee	
2020	Winter Counts	Goodreads Choice Award for Mystery & Thriller	Nominee	
2021	Winter Counts	Anthony Award for Best First Novel	Winner	
2021	Winter Counts	Barry Award for Best First Novel	Winner	
2021	Winter Counts	Edgar Allan Poe Award for Best First Novel	Finalist	
2021	Winter Counts	Hammett Prize	Finalist	
2021	Winter Counts	High Plains Book Award for Indigenous Writer	Winner	
2021	Winter Counts	International Thriller Writers Award for Best First Novel	Winner	
2021	Winter Counts	Lefty Award for Best Debut Mystery	Winner	
2021	Winter Counts	Macavity Award for Best First Mystery Novel	Winner	
2021	Winter Counts	Spur Award for Best Western Contemporary Novel	Winner	
2021	Winter Counts	Spur Award for Best First Western Novel	Winner	
2022	"Skin"	Spur Award for Best Western Short Fiction	Winner	

== Selected works ==
=== Books ===
- Spotted Tail, illustrated by Jim Yellowhawk (2019)
- Winter Counts (2020)
- Wisdom Corner (2026)

=== Short works ===
==== Creative nonfiction ====
- “Carlisle Longings,” published in Shenandoah (2020)
- “Writing in the Time of Family Separations,” published in Shenandoah blog The Peak (2020)

==== Other nonfiction ====
- “This 19th-Century Law Helps Shape Criminal Justice in Indian Country,” published in The New York Times (July 19, 2020)
- “Distractions,” published on the Poisoned Pen blog (August 19, 2020)
- “Seven Essential Native American Crime Novels,” published in The Strand Magazine (September 5, 2020)
- “Why Indigenous Crime Fiction Matters,” published in CrimeReads (September 9, 2020)
- “A Year in Reading,” published in The Millions (December 9, 2020)
- “Writing to Change the World” published in Writer’s Digest (July/August 2021)
- “Writing Winter Counts,” published in The Bookseller (August 13, 2021)
- “Looking Back on ‘There There,'” published on Alta Online (November 9, 2021)

==== Short stories ====
- “Spork,” published in Transmotion (2016)
- “Skin,” published in Midnight Hour, edited by Abby Vandiver (2021)
- “Turning Heart,” published in This Time For Sure, edited by Hank Phillippi Ryan (2021). Reprinted in the Best American Mystery and Suspense 2022, edited by Jess Walter and Steph Cha
- “Colfax and Havana,” published in Denver Noir, edited by Cynthia Swanson (2022)
- “Hooch,” published in The Perfect Crime, edited by Maxim Jakubowski and Vaseem Khan (2022)
- “Sundays,” published in Never Whistle at Night: An Indigenous Dark Fiction Anthology, edited by Shane Hawk and Theodore C. Van Alst, Jr. (2023)
