= Haseloff =

Haseloff is a surname. Notable people with the surname include:

- Cynthia Haseloff (born 1948), American author
- Daniel Haseloff (born 1988), German politician
- Elisabeth Haseloff (1914–1974), German Lutheran pastor
- Kurt Haseloff (1894–1978), German general in the Wehrmacht during World War II
- Reiner Haseloff (born 1954), German politician, Minister-President of Saxony-Anhalt (2011–2026)

== See also ==
- Hasselhoff
