= Hillerman Prize =

Former literary prize

The Hillerman Prize (2007–2021) was an annual literary award presented to a unpublished author whose mystery novel is set in the Southwest United States. The prize honored American writer Tony Hillerman (1925–2008).

In 2016, Western Writers of America began sponsoring the prize alongside Minotaur Books and Wordharvest.

== Winners ==
Prize winners
Year	Author	Title	Ref.
2007	Christine Barber	The Replacement Child	
2008	Roy Chaney	The Ragged Edge of Nowhere	
2009	No award presented		
2010	Tricia Fields	The Territory	
2011	Andrew Hunt	City of Saints	
2012	No award presented		
2013	C. B. McKenzie	Bad Country	
2014	John Fortunato	Dark Reservations	
2015	Kevin Wolf	The Homeplace	
2016	No award presented		
2017	Carol Potenza	Hearts of the Missing	
2018	No award presented		
2019	Samantha Jayne Allen	Pay Dirt Road	
2020	Christina Estes	Off the Air	
