= Spur Award for Best Short Fiction =

Literary award category

This is a list of the works of fiction which have won the Spur Award for Best Short Fiction:

- 1953 - Short Story: "Gun Job" by Thomas Thompson
- 1954 - Short Story: "Blood on the Sun" by Thomas Thompson
- 1955 - Short Story: "Bad Company" by S. Omar Barker
- 1956 - Short Story: "Lost Sister" by Dorothy M. Johnson
- 1957 - Short Story: "The Brushoff' by Peggy Simson Curry
- 1958 - Short Story: "Thief in Camp" by Bill Gulick
- 1959 - Short Story: "Grandfather Out of the Past" by Noel Loomis
- 1960 - Short Story: "The Shaming of Broken Horn" by Bill Gulick
- 1961 - Short Story: `A Town Named Hate" by John Prebble
- 1962 - Short Story: "Isley's Stranger" by Will Henry
- 1963 - Short Story: "Comanche Woman" by Fred Grove
- 1964 - Short Story: "Log Studio of C.M. Russell" by Lola Shelton
- 1965 - Short Material: "Tallest Indian in Toltepec" by Will Henry
- 1966 - Short Material: "Empty Saddles at Christmas" by S. Omar Barker
- 1967 - Short Material: "The Guns of William Longley" by Donald Hamilton
- 1968 - Short Material: "When the Caballos Came" by Fred Grove
- 1969 - Short Subject: "Westward to Blood and Glory" by Cliff Farrell
- 1970 - Short Subject: "In the Silence" by Peggy Simson Curry
- 1971 - Short Subject: "Shootout in Burke Canyon" by Earl Clark
- 1972 - Short Subject: "Call of the Cow Country?' by Harry F. Webb
- 1973 - Short Subject: "The Comancheros" by John Harrell
- 1974 - Short Subject: (tie) "The Other Nevadan" by Robert Laxalt and "Buried Money" by Eve Ball
- 1975 - Short Subject: "Apaches in the History of the Southwest" by Donald Worcester
- 1976 - Short Subject: "Jonathan Gilliam & The White Man's Burden" by C. L. Sonnichsen
- 1977 - Short Subject: "Where the Cowboys Hunkered Down" by John L. Sinclair
- 1978 - Short Subject: `A Season for Heroes" by Carla Kelly
- 1979 - Short Subject: "Jason Glendauer's Watch" by James Bellah
- 1980 - Short Subject: "One Man's Code" by Wayne Barton
- 1981 - Short Subject (Fiction): "Kathleen Flaherty's Long Winter" by Carla Kelly
- 1982 - Short Subject (Fiction): "Horseman" by Oakley Hall
- 1983 - Short Subject (Fiction): "The Ten Sleep Mail" by William F. Bragg, Jr.
- 1984 - Short Subject (Fiction): "Sale of One Small Ranch" by Paul St. Pierre
- 1985 - Short Fiction: "The Way It Was Told to Me" by Bill Brett
- 1986 - Short Fiction: "The Bandit" by Loren D. Estleman
- 1987 - Short Fiction: "The Orange County Cowboys" by Max Evans
- 1988 - Short Fiction: "Yellow Bird: An Imaginary Autobiography" by Robert J. Conley
- 1989 - Short Fiction: "The Indian Summer of Nancy Redwing" by Harry W Paige
- 1990 - Short Fiction: "Just As I Am" by Joyce Gibson Roach
- 1991 - Short Fiction: "Cimarron, The Killer" by Benjamin Capps
- 1992 - Short Fiction: "The Face" by Ed Gorman
- 1993 - Short Fiction: "Lou" by Jane Candia Coleman
- 1994 - Short Fiction: "Charity" by Sandra Whiting
- 1995 - Short Fiction: `Are You Coming Back, Phin Montana?" by Jane Candia Coleman
- 1996 - Short Fiction: "The Alchemist" by Loren D. Estleman
- 1997 - In this year the WWA Executive Board voted to redesignate the Spur Awards to reflect the year the award is presented rather than the year the work was published.
- 1998 - Short Fiction: "Sue Ellen Learns to Dance" by Judy Alter
- 1999 - Short Fiction: "Secrets of the Lost Cannon" by Allen P. Bristow
- 2000 - Short Fiction: "Opening Day" by David Marion Wilkinson
- 2001 - Best Western Short Fiction: “All or Nothing” by Gary Svee
- 2002 - Short Fiction: "A Piano at Dead Man's Crossing" by Johnny D. Boggs
- 2003 - Best Western Short Fiction: "The Old Man" by Jimbo Brewer
- 2004 - Short Fiction: "Second Coming" by Andrew Geyer
- 2005 - Short Fiction: "The Promotion" by Larry D. Sweazy
- 2006 - Short Fiction: "Pecker's Revenge" by Lori Van Pelt
- 2007 - Best Western Short Fiction: "Comanche Moon" by Dusty Richards
- 2008 - Best Western Short Fiction Story: "Crucifixion River" by Marcia Muller and Bill Pronzini
- 2009 - Best Western Short Fiction Story: “Cornflower Blue” by Susan K. Salzer
- 2010 - Best Western Short Fiction Story:“At the End of the Orchard” by John D. Nesbitt
- 2011 - Best Western Short Fiction Story:“Bonnie and Clyde in the Backyard” by K.L. Cook
- 2012 - Best Western Short Fiction Story:(tie) “The Death of Delgado” by Rod Miller and “The Deacon’s Horse” by Clay Reynolds
- 2013 - Best Western Short Fiction Story: "The Saint of Pox Island" by Susan K. Salzer and "The Day Delgado Rode In" by Lori Van Pelt.
- 2014 - Best Western Short Fiction Story: "The Other James Brother" by Mark Lee Gardner.
- 2015 - Best Western Short Fiction Story: "The Death of Delgado" by Rod Miller.
- 2016 - Best Western Short Fiction Story: "The Scalper" by Richard Prosch.
- 2017 - Best Western Short Fiction Story: "Odell's Bones" by Troy D. Smith.
- 2018 - Best Western Short Fiction Story: "Lost and Found: A Short Story" by Rod Miller.
- 2019 - Best Western Short Fiction Story: "Buck's Last Ride" by Therese Greenwood.
- 2020 - Best Western Short Fiction Story: "The Medicine Robe by Michael Zimmer.
- 2021 - Best Western Short Fiction Story: "Belthanger" by Kevin Wolf.
- 2022 - Best Western Short Fiction Story: "Skin" by David Heska Wanbli Weiden.
- 2023 - Best Western Short Fiction Story: "No Quarter" by Kathleen O'Neal Gear.
- 2024 - Best Western Short Fiction Story: "Bad Choices: A Wyoming Chronicles Story" by W. Michael Gear.
- 2025 - Best Western Short Fiction Story: "The Devil's Left Hand" by Michael John Petty.
