= Richard S. Wheeler =

American writer (1935–2019)

- Born: Richard Shaw Wheeler; 1935; Milwaukee, Wisconsin
- Died: February 24, 2019 (aged 83–84); Livingston, Montana
- Education: University of Wisconsin
- Occupations: Writer, newspaper and book editor
- Spouse: Sue Hart
- Writing career
- Genres: Western literature Historical fiction
- Notable work: "Barnaby Skye" book series
- Website: www.richardswheeler.com

Richard Shaw Wheeler (1935 – February 24, 2019) was an American writer and former newspaper editor. He is best known for his novels set in the American West, including the "Barnaby Skye" series. Wheeler was the 2001 recipient of the Owen Wister Award for lifetime contributions to Western literature, and is a six-time Western Writers of America Spur Award winner.

== Early life ==
Born in Milwaukee, Wisconsin, Richard Wheeler was raised in the suburb of Wauwatosa in a family descended from New England Puritans. Following graduation from Wauwatosa High School in 1953, Wheeler moved to California in the mid-1950s for three years. At first intending to be a playwright, he studied at the Pasadena Playhouse, later taking acting lessons and trying his hand at being a screenwriter. While in California he supported himself by working in a Hollywood record store and as a freelance photographer. Meeting with little success, he returned to his native Wisconsin and attended the University of Wisconsin–Madison.

== Professional career ==
Wheeler returned to the west after attending the University of Wisconsin, working at a succession of newspapers including the Nevada Appeal, Phoenix Gazette, Oakland Tribune, and Billings Gazette. In 1972 he switched careers and became a book editor for a number of publishers, most notably Walker & Company. Inspired by both the westerns he was editing and the frequent layoffs in the industry which left him with free time, Wheeler penned his first novel, Bushwhack, published by Doubleday in 1978. He wrote five more novels in the 1970s and 1980s while still working as a book editor, before turning his attention to writing full-time in 1987. Two years later he won the first of five Spur Awards from the Western Writers of America with his 1989 book, Fool's Coach.

== Personal life ==
Wheeler was married to Sue Hart, a professor at Montana State University Billings, who died in the summer of 2014. The couple divided their time between homes in Livingston, Montana, on the northern edge of Yellowstone National Park, and Billings, Montana.

== Published novels ==
=== Skye's West series ===
1. Sun River (1989)
2. Bannack (1989)
3. The Far Tribes (1990)
4. Yellowstone (1990)
5. Bitterroot (1991)
6. Sundance (1992)
7. Wind River (1993)
8. Santa Fe (1994)
9. Rendezvous (1997)
10. Dark Passage (1998)
11. Going Home (2000)
12. Downriver (2001)
13. The Deliverance (2003)
14. The Fire Arrow (2006)
15. The Canyon of Bones (2007)
16. Virgin River (2008)
17. North Star (2009)
18. The Owl Hunt (2010)
19. The First Dance (2011)

=== Santiago Toole series ===
- The Final Tally (1990)
- Deuces and Ladies Wild (1991)
- The Fate (1992)
- Incident at Fort Keogh (1996)

=== Rocky Mountain Company series ===
- The Rocky Mountain Company (1991)
- Cheyenne Winter (2002)
- Fort Dance (2003)

=== Sam Flint series ===
1. Flint's Gift (1997)
2. Flint's Truth (1990)
3. Flint's Honor (1999)

=== Cletus Parr series ===
- Big Apple (2004)
- Bad Apple (2009)

=== Standalone novels ===
- Pagans in the Pulpit (1979)
- Bushwack (1978)
- Beneath the Blue Mountain (1979)
- Winter Grass (1983)
- Sam Hook (1986)
- Dodging Red Cloud (1987)
- Richard Lamb (1987)
- Stop (1988)
- Fools' Coach (1989)
- Where the River Runs (1990)
- Montana Hitch (1990)
- Badlands (1992)
- Cashbox (1994)
- Goldfield (1995)
- Sierra (1996)
- Second Lives (1997)
- The Buffalo Commons (1998)
- Aftershocks (1999)
- Sun Mountain (1999)
- Masterson (1999)
- The Witness (2000)
- Restitution (2001)
- The Fields of Eden (2001)
- Drums Ring (2001)
- Eclipse (2002)
- Cutthroat Gulch (2003)
- The Exile (2003)
- The Bounty Trail (2004)
- Vengeance Valley (2004)
- An Obituary for Major Reno (2004)
- Trouble in Tombstone (2004)
- Seven Miles to Sundown (2005)
- Fire in the Hole (2005)
- From Hell to Midnight (2006)
- The Honorable Cody (2006)
- Snowbound (2010)
- Yancey's Jackpot (2010)
- The Richest Hill on Earth (2011)
- Easy Street (2012)
- Anything Goes (2015)
- Easy Pickings (2016)
- Brass in the Desert (2016)

== Awards ==
- Spur Award for Best Western Novel – 1989
- Spur Award for Best Novel of the West – 1996
- Spur Award for Best Western Novel – 2000
- Owen Wister Award – 2001
- Spur Award for Best Original Mass Market Paperback Novel – 2005
- Spur Award for Best Western Short Novel – 2011
