= Winfred Blevins =

American author (1938–2023)

Winfred (Win) Blevins
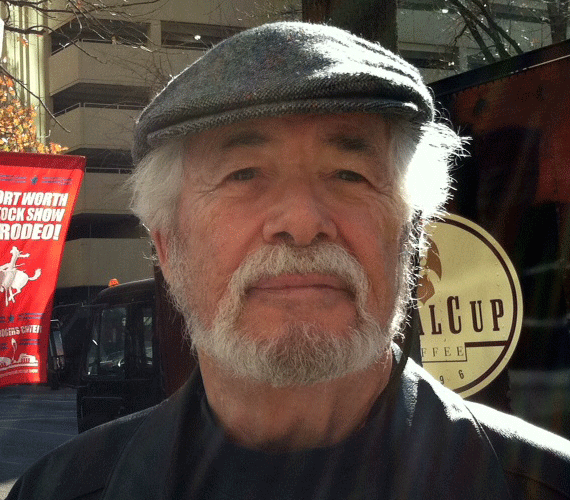
- Born: October 21, 1938; Little Rock, Arkansas, U.S.
- Died: July 2, 2023 (aged 84)
- Education: Columbia University; University of Southern California
- Occupation: Author
- Writing career
- Pen name: Caleb Fox
- Genres: Fiction; non-fiction
- Notable awards: Spur Award for Best Novel of the West (1995, 2004); Owen Wister Award (2015)

Winfred Blevins (October 21, 1938 – July 2, 2023) was an American author of fiction and non-fiction. He wrote many books about the western mountain trappers, and is known for his "mastery of western lore." His notable works include Stone Song, So Wild a Dream, and Dictionary of the American West. According to WorldCat, the Dictionary of the American West is held in 728 libraries. Blevins won numerous awards, including being named winner of the Owen Wister Award for Lifetime Achievement in writing literature of the West, being selected for the Western Writers Hall of Fame, being twice named 'Writer of the Year' by the Wordcraft Circle of Native Writers, and winning two Spur Awards for Novel of the West.

== Early life and education ==
Blevins, of Cherokee, Welsh-Irish, and African-American descent, was a native of Little Rock, Arkansas. He was born on October 21, 1938. After attending school in St. Louis, Missouri and receiving a scholarship, he moved to New York, where he received a master's degree from Columbia University, graduating with honors, and continued to California, where he received a foundation grant and was graduated from the Music Conservatory of the University of Southern California.

== Journalism and writing career ==
Win Blevins started his writing career as a music and drama reviewer for the Los Angeles Times. He then became the entertainment editor and principal theater and movie critic of the Hearst newspaper in Los Angeles, the Herald Examiner. His first book was published in 1973 and since then he has made a living as a freelance writer. He has written articles for magazines, essays, published forty books, one a dictionary, several travel guides to the West, and the rest novels, including fantasy, historical fiction, and modern works of the West such as those of his friends and contemporaries Rudolfo Anaya, John Nichols, Scott Momaday, and Max Evans wrote. For fifteen years he was an editor at Macmillan Publishing. From 2010 to 2012, Win spent two years as a Gaylord Family Visitor Professor of Professional Writing at the University of Oklahoma.

== Screenplays ==
Blevins also wrote thirteen screenplays, including Atlas Shrugged for Al Ruddy; several for Paramount Pictures; The King of Paris with Dale Wasserman for CBS; The Real Dracula with Dale Wasserman (for Telly Savalas), CBS; Spring in Czechoslovakia for David Picker; John Milius's A-Team; Oonadaga for NBC; The Last Free Man for Fred Read, and six others. (In 1974 David Picker announced he would produce Ranch Life and the Hunting Trail, directed by John Milius and written by Winfred Blevins, about Theodore Roosevelt.)

== Books ==
Most of Win Blevins' books were originally published as hardbacks, and were subsequently made available as mass-market paperbacks, trade paperbacks, book club editions, foreign editions, audio books, and e-books. Almost all are still in print.

- Give Your Heart to the Hawks, Nash Publishing, 1973. Narrative non-fiction.
- Charbonneau: Man of Two Dreams, Nash Publishing, 1975. Historical fiction.
- The Misadventures of Silk and Shakespeare, Jameson Books, 1985. Historical fiction.
- The Yellowstone, Bantam, 1988 (Rivers West series), Bantam Books. Historical fiction.
- Roadside History of Yellowstone Park, 1989, Mountain Press Publishing Company. Guide Book.
- Powder River, Bantam, 1990 (Rivers West series). Historical fiction.
- The Snake River, Bantam, 1992 (Rivers West series). Historical fiction.
- The High Missouri, Bantam, 1994 (River West series). Historical fiction.
- Dictionary of the American West, 1993, Facts on File.
- History from the Highways: Wyoming, with Thomas Schmidt, 1993, Pruett Press. Guide Book.
- Stone Song: A Novel of the Life of Crazy Horse, TOR-Forge Books, 1995. Historical fiction. According to WorldCat, the book is held in 774 libraries
- The Rock Child, TOR-Forge Books, 1998. Historical fiction.
- RavenShadow, TOR-Forge Books, 1999. Historical fantasy.
- Dictionary of the American West, expanded edition, Sasquatch Books, 2001. Expanded to include the Pacific Northwest, especially Alaska.
- Moonlight Water, written by Win Blevins and Meredith Blevins, TOR-Forge Books, 2015.
- The Darkness Rolling, written by Win Blevins and Meredith Blevins, TOR-Forge Books, 2015.
- Stealing Fire, written by Win Blevins and Meredith Blevins, TOR-Forge Books, 2016
- Going Home, written by Win Blevins and Meredith Blevins, WordWorx Publishing, 2017
- Jedediah Smith: The Story of a Wayfaring Heart, Wordworx Publishing, 2020
- Learning to Soar: Memoir of a Spiritual Awakening, Wordworx Publishing, 2020

=== The Rendezvous Series ===
- So Wild a Dream, TOR-Forge Books, 2003. Historical fiction. According to WorldCat, the book is held in 1094 libraries, his most widely held book.
- Beauty for Ashes, TOR-Forge Books, 2004. Historical fiction.
- Dancing with the Golden Bear, TOR-Forge, 2005. Historical fiction.
- Heaven Is a Long Way Off, TOR-Forge Books, 2006. Historical fiction.
- A Long and Winding Road, TOR-Forge Books, 2007. Historical fiction.
- Dreams Beneath Your Feet, TOR-Forge Books, 2008. Historical fiction.

=== Natural history ===
- Buffalo, Rio Nuevo, 2005 (Looks West series). Natural history.

=== Cherokee pre-History fantasy ===
- Zadayi Red, TOR-Forge Books, 2009, published under the pen name Caleb Fox. Historical fantasy. Reissued as 'The Promised One' by Meredith & Win Blevins
- Shadows in the Cave, TOR-Forge Books, 2010, TOR-Forge Books, published under the pen name Caleb Fox. Historical fantasy. Reissued with authors Meredith & Win Blevins

=== Yazzie Goldman thrillers ===
- Stealing Fire, TOR-Forge, 2016
- The Darkness Rolling, TOR-Forge, 2015

== As general editor ==
Blevins also created, edited, and co-published the series Classics of the Fur Trade.

- The River of the West: The Adventures of Joe Meek, volume one—The Mountain Years, by Frances Fuller Victor, Mountain Press Publishing Company, 1983. Autobiography.
- Journal of a Mountain Man, by James Clyman, Mountain Press Publishing Company, 1984. Journal.
- The River of the West: The Adventures of Joe Meek, volume two—The Oregon Years, by Frances Fuller Victor, Mountain Press Publishing Company, 1985. Autobiography.
- Edward Warren, by Sir William Drummond Stewart, Mountain Press Publishing Company, 1986. Fiction.
- The Personal Narrative of James O. Pattie, by James Ohio Pattie, Mountain Press Publishing Company, 1988. Memoir.
- The Long Rifle, by Steward Edward White, Mountain Press Publishing Company, 1990. Historical fiction.

== Awards ==
- Owen Wister Award, 2015, for lifetime achievement in writing literature of the West.
- Selection to the Western Writers Hall of Fame, displayed in the Buffalo Bill Museum, Cody, Wyoming, 2015.
- So Wild a Dream- Spur award, 2004.
- Stone Song –Spur Award, Mountains and Plains Booksellers award for best fiction of 1995.
- Dictionary of the American West – Wordcraft Circle of Native Writers and Storytellers (Writer of the Year) 2002.
- Heaven Is a Long Way Off - Wordcraft Circle of Native Writers and Storytellers (Writer of the Year) 2006–2007.

== Pseudonyms ==
Win and his wife, novelist Meredith Blevins, published two novels and an article in True West Magazine under the pen name, Caleb Fox.
