= Irene Bennett Brown =

American author

Irene Bennett Brown is an American author of children's, young adult and adult fiction. Brown was born in Topeka, Kansas and when she was nine years old, moved with her family from Kansas to the Willamette Valley in Oregon.

Brown's fourth book, To Rainbow Valley, became the first one to sell and be published in 1969. It was re-released as an Easy Reader book in 2001.

Brown has her own publishing company, Riveredge Books, which has published and re-issued several of her books. Brown is a member of Western Writers of America and is a founding member of Women Writing the West. She continues to live in Oregon with her husband, Bob.

== Works ==
Children's and young adult books

- To Rainbow Valley (1969 and 2000)
- Skitterbrain (1978)
- Run from a Scarecrow (1978)
- Willow Whip (1979)
- Morning Glory Afternoon (1981)
- Before the Lark (1982)
- Just Another Gorgeous Guy (1984)
- Answer Me, Answer Me (1985)
- I Loved You, Logan McGee (1987)

Adult novels

- The Plainswoman (1994)
- Women of Paragon Springs Series
  - Long Road Turning (2000)
  - Blue Horizons (2001)
  - No Other Place (2002)
  - Reap the South Wind (2002)
- Haven (2003)
- The Bargain (2007)

== Awards and recognition ==
- Western Writers of America Spur Award Juvenile 1982 – Before the Lark
- Mark Twain Award nomination 1984-85 – Before the Lark
- Evelyn Sibley Lampman Award 1988
- Western Writers of America Spur Award finalist – The Plainswoman
