= Sonnichsen =

Sonnichsen is a surname. Notable people with the surname include:

- Albert Sonnichsen (1878–1931), American journalist, author, and adventurer
- C. L. Sonnichsen (1901–1991), American English professor
- Yngvar Sonnichsen (1873–1938), Norwegian-born American painter
