= Judy Alter =

American author and essayist (1938–2024)

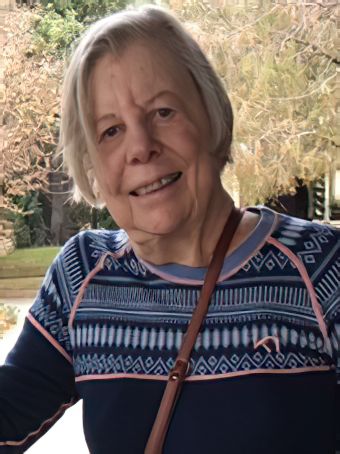
- Born: July 22, 1938; Chicago, Illinois, U.S.
- Died: July 13, 2024 (aged 85); Fort Worth, Texas, U.S.
- Education: University of Chicago; Truman State University; Texas Christian University
- Occupation: Novelist
- Spouse: Joel Alter (1965–1982)
- Children: Colin David; Megan Jean; James Andrew; Jordan Elisabeth
- Writing career
- Period: 1978–2024
- Genres: Historical fiction Cozy mysteries
- Subjects: Texas and the American West; Chicago
- Notable works: The Gilded Cage; Mattie; Libbie
- Website: www.judyalter.com

Judy Alter (July 22, 1938 – July 13, 2024) was an American novelist and author of both fiction and nonfiction for adults and young adults. Alter writes primarily about the history and literature of Texas and the American West, especially the experiences of women in the nineteenth century. She has also written sixteen cozy mysteries, primarily set in Texas. Over fifty of her young adult non-fiction books have been published for school libraries by Franklin Watts and Scholastic. Alter died on July 13, 2024, at the age of 85.

== Education ==
Alter grew up in Chicago, where she attended public schools. After two years at Cornell College she earned a bachelor's degree at the University of Chicago. She went on to earn an M.Ed. at Truman State University in Missouri and then earned her Ph.D. with a special interest in western American literature at Texas Christian University (TCU).

== TCU Press ==
Prior to becoming an author, Alter worked for TCU Press, first as editor and, then as director. She retired in 2009 and began writing.

== Honors and awards ==
Judy Alter is a past president of Western Writers of America and former secretary of the Texas Institute of Letters. She holds awards from the National Cowboy and Western Heritage Museum Hall of Fame, the Texas Institute of Letters, and Western Writers of America (WWA), including the Owen Wister Award for Lifetime Achievement, and was inducted into the WWA Hall of Fame in June 2015 and the Fort Worth Public Library Hall of Fame. She was named one of the Outstanding Women of Fort Worth by the mayor in 1988 and was included by the Dallas Morning News in a list of a hundred women who have left their mark on Texas. In 2016 Judy was a finalist for the Will Rogers Medallion Award for her cookbook, Texas Is Chili Country. She is a member of Sisters in Crime and its Guppies subgroup, the Texas Institute of Letters, and Women Writing the West.

== Works ==
=== Historical fiction ===
- Mattie (1998) — (Spur Award)
- Libbie (1994)
- Jessie (1995)
- Cherokee Rose (1996)
- Sundance, Butch, and Me (2002)
- The Gilded Cage (2016)
- So Far from Paradise (2019)
- A Ballad for Sallie (1992)

=== Young-adult fiction ===
- After Pa was Shot (1978)
- Luke and the Van Zandt County War (1984)
- Maggie and a Horse Named Devildust (1989)
- Maggie and the Search for Devildust (1989)
- Maggie and Devildust—Ridin’ High (1990)
- Katie and the Recluse (1991)
- Callie Shaw, Stableboy (1996)

=== Mysteries ===
==== Kelly O-Connell mysteries ====
- Skeleton in a Dead Space (2011)
- No Neighborhood for Old Women (2012)
- Trouble in a Big Box (2012)
- Danger Comes Home (2013)
- Deception in Strange Places (2014)
- Desperate for Death (2015)
- Contract for Chaos (2018)
- The Color of Fear (2017) — (Kelly O’Connell novella)

==== Blue Plate Cafe mysteries ====
- Murder at the Blue Plate Café (2013)
- Murder at Tremont House (2014)
- Murder at Peacock Mansion (2015)
- Murder at the Bus Depot (2018)

==== Oak Grove mysteries ====
- The Perfect Coed (2014)
- Pigface and the Perfect Dog (2017)

==== Other ====
- Saving Irene (A Chicago mystery) (2019)

=== Cookbooks ===
- Cooking My Way through Life with Kids and Books (2009)
- Extraordinary Texas Chefs (2008)
- Texas is Chili Country (2015) — (Will Rogers Medallion Award)
- Gourmet on a Hot Plate (2018)

=== Selected publications ===
- Extraordinary Women of the American West (1999)
- Extraordinary Women of Texas (2008)
- Sue Ellen Learns to Dance and Other Stories (2006)
- The Second Battle of the Alamo (2020)
- The Most Land, the Best Cattle: The Waggoners of Texas (2021)
