= Stephen Holt =

Stephen Holt may refer to:

- Stephen Holt (basketball) (born 1991), Filipino-American basketball player
- Stephen Holt (field hockey) (born 1974), Australian field hockey player
- Stephen Holt, vocalist for the British band Inspiral Carpets
- Stephen Holt, pen name of writer Harlan Howard Thompson (1894–1987)
