= Svee =

Svee is a surname. Notable people with the surname include:

- Gary Svee (born 1943), American author and journalist
- Stig Tore Svee (born 1963), Norwegian ice sledge hockey player

== See also ==
- Sven
