= Stellman =

Stellman is a surname. Notable people with the surname include:

- Louis J. Stellman (1877–1961), American photographer, newspaper columnist, biographer, painter and poet
- Marcel Stellman (1925–2021), Belgian record producer and lyricist
- Martin Stellman (born 1948), British screenwriter and director
