= Cynthia Haseloff =

American author of western novels (born 1948)

Cynthia Haseloff (born 1948) is an American author of western novels.

Haseloff was born in Vernon, Texas. She is a part of the Western Writers of America and used to be a board member of Shiloh Museum and the Washington County Historical Society. Her western novel The Kiowa Verdict won the Spur Award for Best Western Novel.

== Bibliography ==
- Ride South! (1980)
- A Killer Comes To Shiloh (1981)
- Marauder (1982)
- Badman (1983)
- The Chains of Sarai Stone (1995)
- Man Without Medicine (1996)
- The Kiowa Verdict (1997)
- Dead Woman's Trail (1998)
- Satanta's Woman (1998)
- Changing Trains (2001)
