= Nelson C. Nye =

20th-century American writer of fiction and non-fiction

- Born: September 28, 1907; Chicago, Illinois
- Died: October 4, 1997 (aged 90); Tucson, Arizona
- Other names: Clem Colt, Drake C. Denver
- Occupations: Author, editor
- Years active: 60
- Known for: Western fiction, co-founder and president Western Writers Association, quarter horse expert

Nelson Coral Nye (1907–1997) was an American writer, editor, and reviewer of Western fiction, and wrote non-fiction books on quarter horses. Besides Nelson C. Nye he also wrote fiction using the pseudonyms Clem Colt and Drake C. Denver. He wrote over 125 books, won two Spur Awards: one for best Western reviewer and critic, and one for his novel Long Run, and in 1968 won the Saddleman Award for ""Outstanding Contributions to the American West".

Nye was born September 28, 1907, in Chicago, Illinois. Before becoming a ranch hand in 1935, he wrote publicity releases and book reviews for the Cincinnati Times-Star and the Buffalo Evening News. He published his first novel in 1936 and continued writing for 60 years. He served with the U.S. Army field artillery during World War II. He worked as the horse editor for Texas Livestock Journal from 1949 to 1952.

In 1953 Nye co-founded the Western Writers of America (WWA) and served as its first president during 1953–1954. He was also the first editor of ROUNDUP, the WWA periodical that is still published today.

From 1958 to 1962 he was the frontier fiction reviewer for the New York Times Book Review, and served a second term as president of the WWA from 1960 to 1961.

Nye became a breeder and trainer of, and expert on, quarter horses, and wrote several non-fiction books on quarter horses and quarter racing. Nye died October 4, 1997, in Tucson at the age of 90.

== Publications ==
=== Nonfiction ===
- Nye, Nelson C. (1948). Outstanding Modern Quarter Horse Sires.
- Nye, Nelson C. (1964). The Complete Book of the Quarter Horse.
- Nye, Nelson C. (1973). Speed and the Quarter Horse.
- Nye, Nelson C. (1983). Great Moments in Quarter Racing History.

=== Fiction ===
- Nye, Nelson C. (1936). The Killer of Cibecue.
- Nye, Nelson C. (1936). Two-Fisted Cowpoke.
- Nye, Nelson C. (1937). The Leather Slapper.
- Nye, Nelson C. (1938). Gunsmoke.
- Nye, Nelson C. (1938). The Star-packers.
- Colt, Clem (1938). The Shootin' Sheriff.
- Colt, Clem (1939). Center-fire Smith.
- Denver, Drake C. (1939). No Wire Range.
- Colt, Clem (1940). Hair-Trigger Realm.
- Colt, Clem (1940). Trigger Finger Law.
- Denver, Drake C. (1940). Turbulent Guns.
- Denver, Drake C. (1940). The Feud At Sleepy Cat.
- Nye, Nelson C. (1941). Pistols for Hire.
- Nye, Nelson C. (1941). Wildcats of Tonto Basin.
- Nye, Nelson C. (1941). Triggers For Six.
- Colt, Clem (1941). Law of the Lost Lands.
- Denver, Drake C. (1941). Tinbadge.
- Nye, Nelson C. (1942). Gun Quick.
- Nye, Nelson C. (1942). The Gunfighter Breed.
- Nye, Nelson C. (1942). Trigger Talk.
- Nye, Nelson C. (1942). Salt River Ranny.
- Colt, Clem (1942). The Five Diamond Brand.
- Denver, Drake C. (1942). Lost Water.
- Nye, Nelson C. (1943). Rustlers' Roost.
- Colt, Clem (1943). The Sure-Fire Kid.
- Colt, Clem (1943). Smoke-wagon Kid.
- Colt, Clem (1943). Rustlers' Roost.
- Nye, Nelson C. (1944). Tornado on Horseback.
- Nye, Nelson C. (1944). Fiddle-Back Ranch.
- Nye, Nelson C. (1944). Renegade Cowboy.
- Colt, Clem (1944). Guns of Horse Prairie.
- Colt, Clem (1944). Maverick Canyon.
- Colt, Clem (1945). Gunslick Mountain.
- Nye, Nelson C. (1946). Ramrod Vengeance.
- Nye, Nelson C. (1946). Blood of Kings.
- Colt, Clem (1946). Once in the Saddle.
- Denver, Drake C. (1946). Breed of the Chaparral.
- Nye, Nelson C. (1947). The Barber of Tubac.
- Colt, Clem (1947). Coyote Song.
- Nye, Nelson C. (1948). Long Rope.
- Colt, Clem (1948). Saddle Bow Slim.
- Nye, Nelson C. (1949). Rustlers of K.C. Ranch.
- Nye, Nelson C. (1950). A Bullet for Billy the Kid.
- Nye, Nelson C. (1950). Horses Is Fine People.
- Nye, Nelson C. (1951). Born to Trouble.
- Nye, Nelson C. (1951). Riders by Night.
- Nye, Nelson C. (1952). Wide Loop.
- Nye, Nelson C. (1952). Tough Company.
- Nye, Nelson C. (1952). Thief River.
- Nye, Nelson C. (1953). Caliban's Colt.
- Nye, Nelson C. (1953). Desert of the Damned.
- Nye, Nelson C. (1953). The Crazy K.
- Colt, Clem (1953). Strawberry Roan.
- Nye, Nelson C. (1954). Hired Hand.
- Nye, Nelson C. (1954). The Red Sombrero.
- Colt, Clem (1954). Smoke Talk.
- Nye, Nelson C. (1955). Quick-Trigger Country.
- Nye, Nelson C. (1955). The Lonely Grass.
- Nye, Nelson C. (1956). The No-Gun Fighter.
- Nye, Nelson C. (1957). Arizona Dead-Shot.
- Nye, Nelson C. (1957). Bandido.
- Nye, Nelson C. (1958). Gunfighter Brand.
- Nye, Nelson C. (1958). Maverick Marshall.
- Nye, Nelson C. (1959). Long Run.
- Nye, Nelson C. (1960). Gunfight at the O.K. Corral. (novelization of the screenplay by Leon Uris)
- Nye, Nelson C. (1960). River of Horns.
- Nye, Nelson C. (1960). The Wolf That Rode.
- Nye, Nelson C. (1960). The Last Bullet.
- Nye, Nelson C. (1960). Johnny Get Your Gun.
- Nye, Nelson C. (1960). Ride the Wild Plains.
- Nye, Nelson C. (1961). The Irreverent Scout.
- Nye, Nelson C. (1962). Death Comes Riding.
- Nye, Nelson C. (1962). Not Grass Alone.
- Nye, Nelson C. (1962). They Won Their Spurs.
- Nye, Nelson C. (1963). Bancroft's Banco.
- Nye, Nelson C. (1963). Death Valley Slim.
- Nye, Nelson C. (1963). Wild River.
- Nye, Nelson C. (1964). Frontier Scout.
- Nye, Nelson C. (1964). Quick-fire Hombre.
- Nye, Nelson C. (1964). Sudden Country.
- Nye, Nelson C. (1964). Weeping Widow Mine.
- Nye, Nelson C. (1965). The Bravo Brand.
- Nye, Nelson C. (1966). Iron Hand.
- Nye, Nelson C. (1967). Shotgun Law.
- Nye, Nelson C. (1967). Trail of Lost Skulls.
- Nye, Nelson C. (1967). Rider on the Road.
- Nye, Nelson C. (1968). A Lost Mine Named Salvation.
- Nye, Nelson C. (1969). Arizona Renegade.
- Nye, Nelson C. (1969). Boss Gun.
- Nye, Nelson C. (1969). Wolftrap.
- Nye, Nelson C. (1971). Kelly.
- Nye, Nelson C. (1972). The Clifton Contract.
- Nye, Nelson C. (1973). The One-Shot Kid.
- Nye, Nelson C. (1975). Horses Women and Guns.
- Nye, Nelson C. (1976). The Kid from Lincoln County.
- Nye, Nelson C. (1976). The Texas Gun.
- Nye, Nelson C. (1976). Trouble at Quinn's Crossing.
- Nye, Nelson C. (1977). Hideout.
- Nye, Nelson C. (1978). Ambush at Yuma's Chimney.
- Nye, Nelson C. (1979). The Marshall of Pioche.
- Nye, Nelson C. (1979). Gringo.
- Nye, Nelson C. (1979). The Texas Tornado.
- Nye, Nelson C. (1979). The Trouble at Pena Blanca.
- Nye, Nelson C. (1979). Guns Horse Prairie.
- Nye, Nelson C. (1980). Palominas Pistolero.
- Nye, Nelson C. (1980). Gun Wolf.
- Nye, Nelson C. (1980). Gunman, Gunman.
- Nye, Nelson C. (1981). Breed of the Chaparral.
- Nye, Nelson C. (1982). Rogue's Rendezvous.
- Nye, Nelson C. (1982). Triggers for Six.
- Nye, Nelson C. (1983). Come A-Smokin'.
- Nye, Nelson C. (1983). Gun Feud at Tiedown.
- Nye, Nelson C. (1983). Single Action.
- Nye, Nelson C. (1984). Feud at Single Clinch.
- Nye, Nelson C. (1984). Hellbound for Ballarat.
- Nye, Nelson C. (1985). Cartridge Case Law.
- Nye, Nelson C. (1985). The Overlanders.
- Nye, Nelson C. (1986). Trigger-Finger Law.
- Nye, Nelson C. (1987). The Parson of Gunbarrel Basin.
- Nye, Nelson C. (1987). The Seven Six Gunners.
- Nye, Nelson C. (1987). Treasure Trail from Tucson.
- Nye, Nelson C. (1987). Deadly Companions.
- Nye, Nelson C. (1987). Horse Thieves.
- Nye, Nelson C. (1988). No Place to Hide.
- Nye, Nelson C. (1988). The Lost Padre.
- Nye, Nelson C. (1988). Mule Man.
- Nye, Nelson C. (1989). Heathcliff Smooth Sailing.
- Nye, Nelson C. (1990). Rafe.
- Nye, Nelson C. (1990). Wild Horse Shorty.
- Nye, Nelson C. (1991). Hideout Mountain.
- Nye, Nelson C. (1992). Fight at Four Corners.
- Nye, Nelson C. (1992). Gunshot Trail.
- Nye, Nelson C. (1992). The Last Chance Kid.
- Nye, Nelson C. (1994). The Shootin' Sheriff.
- Nye, Nelson C. (1996). The White Chip.
- Nye, Nelson C. (1996). Renegade Cowboy.
- Nye, Nelson C. (2001). Gun-Hunt for the Sundance Kid.
- Nye, Nelson C. (2001). G Stands for Gun.
- Nye, Nelson C. (2002). Ranger's Revenge.
