= Matt Braun =

American author

Matthew Braun (1932–2016) was an American author specializing in novels of the American West. He had written fifty-six books, most of which are in the Western genre and had over 40 million copies in print.

== Biography ==
Born in Oklahoma, Braun was raised in a ranching family among the Cherokee and Osage tribes. The state has been the setting of several novels, including Outlaw Kingdom, The Kincaids, and One Last Town.

== Books ==
=== Westerns ===
- Black Fox
- Black Gold
- Bloodsport
- Bloodstorm
- Bloody Hand
- The Brannocks
- Buck Colter
- Cimarron Jordan
- Crossfire
- Dakota
- Deadwood
- Deathwalk
- A Distant Land
- Doc Holliday
- Dodge City
- El Paso
- The Gamblers
- Gentleman Rogue
- Hangman's Creek
- Hickok & Cody
- The Highbinders
- Indian Territory
- The Judas Tree
- Jury Of Six
- The Killing Touch
- The Kincaids
- Kinch
- The Last Stand
- Lords Of The Land
- The Manhunter
- Noble Outlaw
- One Last Town (also published as You Know My Name)
- Outlaw Kingdom
- The Overlords
- Rio Grande
- Rio Hondo
- The Road To Hell
- Savage Land
- Shadow Killers
- The Second Coming Of Lucas Brokaw
- The Spoilers
- Tenbow
- Texas Empire
- A Time Of Innocence
- Tombstone
- Wages Of Sin
- The Warlords
- Westward Of The Law
- The Wild Ones
- Windward West
- Wyatt Earp
- WesternLore

=== Non-fiction ===
- How To Write Novels That Sell
- Matt Braun's Western Cooking
- How To Write Western Novels

== In other media ==
The 1973 novel Black Fox, was made into the CBS miniseries of the same name in 1995. It starred Tony Todd as Britt Johnson/Black Fox, Christopher Reeve as Alan Johnson, and Nancy Sorel as Sarah Johnson. The adaptation was written by John Binder, and directed by Steven Hilliard Stern.

The 1997 novel One Last Town served as inspiration for the TNT miniseries You Know My Name in 1999. It starred Sam Elliott as Bill Tilghman, and Arliss Howard as Wiley Lynn. Braun is credited as "Historical consultant" on the series.

== Awards ==
Braun was the winner of the Owen Wister Award for lifetime achievement, the Western Writers of America Golden Spur Award, and the Festival of the West Cowboy Spirit Award. He had also been awarded the honorary title of Oklahoma Territorial Marshal by the Governor of Oklahoma.
