= C. L. Sonnichsen =

American historian

- Born: Charles Leland Sonnichsen; September 20, 1901; Fonda, Iowa
- Died: June 29, 1991 (aged 89)
- Occupation: Professor

Academic background
- Education: Harvard University

Academic work
- Institutions: University of Texas at El Paso
- Main interests: Southwestern history and folklore
- Notable works: The Mescalero Apaches, Alias Billy the Kid and Tucson: The Life and Times of an American City

Charles Leland Sonnichsen (September 20, 1901 – June 29, 1991) was a Benedict Professor of English at the University of Texas, El Paso. In addition to being a noted Southwestern historian and folklorist, he was a prolific author and screenwriter. Among his many books are The Mescalero Apaches, Alias Billy the Kid and Tucson: The Life and Times of an American City. Sonichsen was the 23rd president of the Western Historical Association.

== Early life and education ==
Born in Fonda, Iowa, Sonnichsen's family later moved to Minnesota where he attended public school in Wadena, Minnesota. He received his B.A. from the University of Minnesota in 1924 and then went on to graduate from Harvard University, where he received his Ph.D. in 1931.

== Career ==
Sonnichsen first held teaching positions St. James School in Faribault, Minnesota, and Carnegie Institute of Technology before relocating to El Paso, Texas and taking a role as associate professor of English at the Texas College of Mines and Metallurgy (later The University of Texas at El Paso). He rose through teaching and administrative ranks to professor, chairman of the English Department (a post he held for 27 years), dean of the graduate school, and H. Y. Benedict Professor of English. He retired from the university in 1972 after a 41-year career there and moved to Tucson, Arizona, where he was editor of the Journal of Arizona History from 1972 to 1977 and continued to write and edit books.

== Books ==
Sonnichsen authored 34 books, including:

- Billy King's Tombstone (1942)
- Roy Bean: Law West of the Pecos (1943)
- Cowboys and Cattle Kings (1950)
- I'll Die Before I'll Run (1951)
- Alias Billy the Kid (1955)
- Ten Texas Feuds (1957)
- The Mescalero Apaches (1958)
- Tularosa: Last of the Frontier West (1960)
- Outlaw: Bill Mitchell Alias Baldy Russell (1964)
- Pass of the North: Four Centuries on the Rio Grande (two volumes: 1968, 1980)
- Colonel Greene and the Copper Skyrocket (1974)
- From Hopalong to Hud: Thoughts on Western Fiction (1978)

In the last years of his life, he continued to publish and edited several more books:

- Geronimo and the End of the Apache Wars (1987)
- Pilgrim in the Sun: A Southwestern Omnibus (1988)
- and The Laughing West (1988)

== Awards ==
Sonnichsen received the Spur Award for Best Short Subject, the Spur Award for Best Nonfiction, and the Spur Award for Best Short Fiction.

== Family ==
C. L. Sonnichsen's granddaughter is Autumn Sonnichsen, a photographer based in New York and São Paulo.
