= Stephen Bly =

American novelist

Mayor of Winchester, Idaho
- In office 2000–2007

Personal details
- Born: August 17, 1944 Ivanhoe, California, U.S.
- Died: June 9, 2011 (aged 66) Lewiston, Idaho, U.S.
- Spouse: Janet Chester
- Children: 3
- Education: California State University, Fresno (BA); Fuller Theological Seminary (M.Div.)

Stephen A. Bly (August 17, 1944 – June 9, 2011) was an American author and politician. He wrote more than 100 books and hundreds of articles, poems, and short stories. His book, The Long Trail Home (Broadman & Holman), won the 2002 Christy Award in the category Western novel. Three other books, Picture Rock (Crossway Books), The Outlaw's Twin Sister (Crossway Books), and Last of the Texas Camp (Broadman & Holman) were Christy Award finalists. Bly's books, primarily Western novel genre in the American West, historical and contemporary, are written from a Christian worldview. His Paperback Writer was noted in a Publishers Weekly review for its “amusing parody of the proverbial dime-store paperback novel."

== Early life and education ==
Stephen Bly was born August 17, 1944, in Ivanhoe, California, to Arthur "Art" Worthington and Alice Wilson Bly. He had one sister, Judith "Judy" Bly Walston. He grew up on a farm in the San Joaquin Valley.

Bly ranched with his uncle M.J. Allen near Coalinga, California, and his father Arthur Bly in Ivanhoe, California, until age 30. Bly graduated summa cum laude in philosophy from California State University, Fresno (1971) and received a M.Div. from Fuller Theological Seminary (1974).

== Career ==
Bly worked on the campaign of Gordon W. Duffy, and later served as his administrative assistant in the California State Assembly. After serving as pastor of several Presbyterian churches in California, he was the pastor of Winchester Community Church and elected to several terms as city councilman and as mayor of Winchester, Idaho (2000–2007). He was an active member of the Western Writers of America. He also collected and restored antique Winchesters and was roving editor for Big Show Journal.

From 1982 to 1996, he was part of a team of speakers who represented Family Living Conferences for Moody Bible Institute. He traveled with Kevin Leman, Gary Chapman (author), Dr. Harold J. Sala, Gary Ezzo, and Greg Speck. He and his wife, Janet, mentored writing students for Jerry B. Jenkins Christian Writers Guild.

== Personal life ==
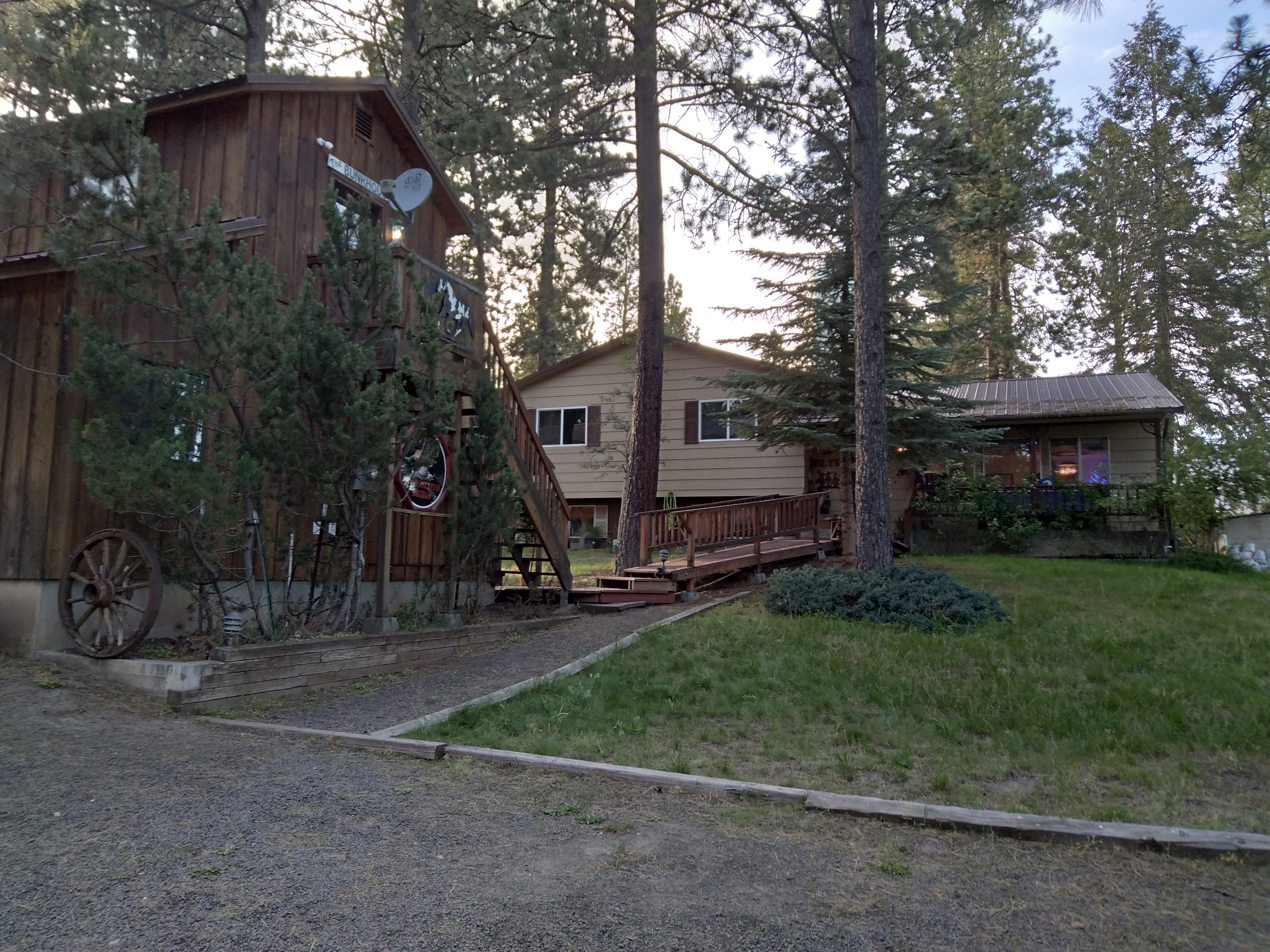
Home of Mr Bly in Winchester, Idaho.

Bly met his wife, writer Janet Chester, at Redwood High School. They had three sons and made their home in Winchester, Idaho.

On June 9, 2011, Bly died at St. Joseph's Regional Medical Center in Lewiston, Idaho, after a five-year battle with prostate cancer. He was 66 years old. At the time of his death, he was working on his last fiction book, Stuart Brannon's Final Shot. His wife, Janet, and three adult sons finished the novel and published it posthumously in 2012.

== Books ==
=== Nonfiction ===
- Radical Discipleship Moody Publishers, 1981)
- God's Angry Side (Moody, 1982)
- Quality Living in a Complicated Age (Here's Life, 1984)
- How To Be a Good Dad (Moody, 1986)
- Just Because They've Left Doesn't Mean They're Gone (FOF, 1993)
- Once a Parent, Always a Parent Tyndale House, 1993)
- Help! My Adult Child Won't Leave Home (Tyndale, 2006)
- The Surprising Side of Grace (Discovery House, 1994)

=== Fiction series ===
- Rivers of Arizona series
- Rivers in Arizona (Back to Bible, 1991)
- Rock of Ages (Back to Bible, 1991)

Stuart Brannon Western series

- Hard Winter at Broken Arrow Crossing (Crossway, 1991)
- False Claims at the Little Stephen Mine (Crossway, 1992)
- Last Hanging at Paradise Meadow (Crossway, 1992)
- Standoff at Sunrise Creek (Crossway, 1993)
- Final Justice at Adobe Wells (Crossway, 1993)
- Son of an Arizona Legend (Crossway, 1993)

Nathan T. Riggins Western Adventure series

- The Dog Who Would Not Smile (Crossway, 1992)
- Coyote True (Crossway, 1992)
- You Can Always Trust a Spotted Horse (Crossway, 1993)
- The Last Stubborn Buffalo in Nevada (Crossway, 1993)
- Never Dance With a Bobcat (Crossway, 1993)
- Hawks Don't Say Goodbye (Crossway, 1994)
- The Adventures of Nathan T. Riggins, Vol. 1 (Crossway, 2001)
- The Adventures of Nathan T. Riggins, Vol. 2 (Crossway, 2001)

Code of the West Western series

- It's Your Misfortune & None of My Own (Crossway, 1994)
- One Went To Denver & The Other Went Wrong (Crossway, 1995)
- Where The Deer & The Antelope Play (Crossway, 1995)
- Stay Away From That City They Call It Cheyenne (Crossway, 1996)
- My Foot's In The Stirrup & My Pony Won't Stand (Crossway, 1996)
- I'm Off To Montana For To Throw The Hoolihan (Crossway, 1997)

The Austin-Stoner Files series

- The Lost Manuscript of Martin Taylor Harrison (Crossway, 1995)
- The Final Chapter of Chance McCall (Crossway, 1996)
- The Kill Fee of Cindy LaCoste (Crossway, 1997)

The Lewis and Clark Squad series

- Intrigue at the Rafter B Ranch (Crossway, 1997)
- The Secret of the Old Rifle (Crossway, 1997)
- Treachery at the River Canyon (Crossway, 1997)
- Revenge on Eagle Island (Crossway, 1998)
- Danger at Deception Pass (Crossway, 1998)
- Hazards of the Half-Court Press (Crossway, 1998)

The Heroines of the Golden West series

- Sweet Carolina (Crossway, 1998)
- The Marquessa (Crossway, 1998)
- Miss Fontenot (Crossway, 1999)

Old California series

- Red Dove of Monterey (Crossway, 1998)
- Last Swan In Sacramento (Crossway, 1999)
- Proud Quail of the San Joaquin (Crossway, 2000)

Fortunes of the Black Hills series

- Beneath a Dakota Cross (B&H, 1999)
- Shadow of Legends (B&H, 2000)
- Long Trail Home (B&H, 2001)
- Friends and Enemies (B&H, 2002)
- Last of the Texas Camp (B&H, 2002)
- The Next Roundup (B&H, 2003)

The Skinners of Goldfield series

- Fool's Gold (Crossway, 2000)
- Hidden Treasure (Crossway, 2000)
- Picture Rock (Crossway, 2001)

The Belles of Lordsburg series

- The Senator's Other Daughters (Crossway, 2001)
- The General's Notorious Widow (Crossway, 2001)
- The Outlaw's Twin Sister (Crossway, 2002)

The Retta Barre Oregon Trail series

- The Lost Wagon Train (Crossway, 2002)
- The Buffalo's Last Stand (Crossway, 2002)
- The Plain Prairie Princess (Crossway, 2002)

The Homestead series

- Strangers & Pilgrims (Crossway, 2002)
- Courage & Compromise (Crossway, 2003)
- Reason & Riots (Crossway, 2003)

Adventures on the Western Frontier series

- Daring Rescue at Sonora Pass (Crossway, 2003)
- Dangerous Ride Across Humboldt Flats (Crossway, 2003)
- Mysterious Robbery on the Utah Plains (Crossway, 2003)

The Horse Dreams series

- Memories of a Dirt Road Town (B&H, 2005)
- The Mustang Breaker (B&H, 2006)
- Wish I'd Known You Tears Ago (B&H, 2006)

=== Fiction stand-alone ===
- The President's Stuck in the Mud (Chariot/Cook, 1982)
- Trouble in Quartz Mountain Tunnel (Chariot/Cook, 1985)
- The Land Tamers (Tyndale, 1987; Center Point, 2009)
- Time Warp Tunnel (Chariot/Cook, 1985)
- Paperback Writer (B&H, 2003)
- One Step Over The Border Center Street, 2007)
- Creede of Old Montana (Center Point, 2009)
- Cowboy For A Rainy Afternoon (Center Point, 2010)
- Throw The Devil Off The Train (Center Point, 2011)
- Stuart Brannon's Final Shot (Center Point, 2012)

=== Co-authored with Janet Bly ===
==== Fiction ====
Crystal Blake series

- Crystal's Perilous Ride (Chariot/Cook, 1986)
- Crystal's Solid Gold Discovery (Chariot/Cook, 1986)
- Crystal's Rodeo Debut (Chariot/Cook, 1986)
- Crystal's Mill Town Mystery (Chariot/Cook, 1986)
- Crystal's Blizzard Trek (Chariot/Cook, 1986)
- Crystal's Grand Entry (Chariot/Cook, 1986)

Hidden West series

- Fox Island (Servant, 1996)
- Copper Hill (Servant, 1997)
- Columbia Falls (Servant, 1998)

Carson City Chronicles series

- Judith and the Judge (Servant, 2000)
- Marthellen and the Major (Servant, 2000)
- Roberta and the Renegade (Servant, 2000)

==== Nonfiction ====
- Questions I'd Like to Ask (Moody, 1982)
- Devotions With a Difference (Moody, 1982)
- How To Be a Good Mom (Moody, 1988)
- Be Your Mate's Best Friend (Moody, 1989)
- How To Be a Good Grandparent (Moody, 1990)
- Winners & Losers (Moody, 1982, 1993)
- The Power of a Godly Grandparent (Beacon Hill, 2003)
