= Don Coldsmith =

American novelist (1926 – 2009)

- Born: February 28, 1926; Iola, Kansas, U.S.
- Died: June 25, 2009 (aged 83); Kansas City, Kansas, U.S.
- Education: Baker University
- Occupation: Author
- Spouse: Edna Coldsmith
- Writing career
- Genre: Westerns
- Notable work: Spanish Bit Saga
- Website: doncoldsmith.net

Don Coldsmith (February 28, 1926 – June 25, 2009) was an American author of primarily Western fiction. A past president of Western Writers of America, Coldsmith wrote more than 40 books, as well as hundreds of newspaper and magazine articles. His "Spanish Bit Saga", a series of related novels, helped to redefine the Western novel by adopting the point of view of the Native Americans, rather than the European immigrants.

== Biography ==
In addition to his career as a writer, Coldsmith was a medical doctor, serving as a family practitioner in Emporia, Kansas, until 1988, when he chose to concentrate on writing. In addition, Coldsmith and his second wife, Edna, were cattle ranchers and breeders of Appaloosa horses.

Son of a Methodist preacher, Coldsmith attended high school in Coffeyville, Kansas, and joined the U.S. Army in 1944. His role as a combat medic in the Pacific Theater of World War II led him to Japan, where he was among the first occupying troops. He was assigned to provide medical care for Japanese war criminals, including Hideki Tōjō, the prime minister.

After the war, Coldsmith matriculated at Baker University, a small Methodist institution in Baldwin City, Kansas. While there, he became a brother of the Zeta Chi fraternity. After graduation, he worked as a YMCA youth director in Topeka, where he helped to achieve the first interracial public swimming pool in the state.

Coldsmith, who had periodically taught English classes at Emporia State University, was awarded the Western Writers of America's Golden Spur award for best original paperback for The Changing Wind of 1990. Other honors include Distinguished Kansan (awarded by the Native Sons and Daughters of Kansas in 1993) and the Edgar Wolfe Award for lifetime contributions to literature (1995). Coldsmith was in high demand as a speaker, especially when the subject was the High Plains and the American West.

Coldsmith suffered a stroke on June 20, 2009, after attending a conference of the Western Writers of America in Oklahoma City, Oklahoma. He died on June 25, 2009, at The University of Kansas Hospital in Kansas City, Kansas, according to his wife Edna.

== Style ==
Coldsmith employs a distinctly lucid and deceptively simple style in his fictional narratives. His prose does not attract attention to itself, with the result that the focus is almost entirely on the story. His characters, who may at first seem uncomplicated, gradually emerge as well-rounded human beings with a complex of often conflicting motives and emotions. Coldsmith's Native American protagonists are genuine and often likable human beings. At the same time, Coldsmith's villains, who are usually Indians themselves, are portrayed as being misled, or suffering from delusion, more than being evil in some sinister or fundamental way.

Though generally well balanced in his portrayal of Native American societies and immigrant societies, Coldsmith's narratives often offer gentle—and sometimes not so gentle—criticism of European-American culture, especially in matters of the spirit.

Coldsmith uses English to achieve the illusion of a native point of view with consistent use of such expressions as "I am made to think. . ." and "Elk-Dog" (for horse) and "Cold Maker" (for winter).

== The Spanish Bit Saga ==
The Spanish Bit Saga, arguably Coldsmith's best-known work, chronicles the unique moment in history when the horse was introduced to the Plains Indians by Spanish explorers, one of whom is separated from his party and adopted by a fictional Plains tribe. The adventures and experiences of the explorers’ Spanish-Indian descendants make up the bulk of the Spanish Bit series.

Coldsmith's fictional tribe in the Spanish Bit series appears to be a synthesis of cultural traditions of the Kansa, Lakota, Kiowa, Cheyenne, Arapaho, Blackfeet, and others. The Pawnee are often depicted as the enemy.

== Bibliography ==
=== Spanish Bit Series ===
- Trail of the Spanish Bit
- The Elk Dog Heritage
- Follow the Wind
- Buffalo Medicine
- Man of the Shadows
- Daughter of the Eagle
- Moon of Thunder
- The Sacred Hills
- Pale Star
- River of Swans
- Return to the River
- The Medicine Knife
- The Flower in the Mountain
- Trail from Taos
- Song of the Rock
- Fort de Chastaigne
- Quest for the White Bull
- Return of the Spanish
- Bride of the Morning Star
- Walks in the Sun
- Thunder Stick
- Track of the Bear
- Child of the Dead
- Bearer of the Pipe
- Medicine Hat
- The Lost Band
- Raven Mocker
- The Pipestone Quest
- The Moon of Madness(Released November 19, 2013)

=== Spanish Bit Spinoffs ===
- The Changing Wind
- The Traveler
- World of Silence

=== Rivers West Series ===
- The Smoky Hill: Rivers West, Book 2

The other books in the series were written by other authors.

=== Historical Novels ===
- Southwind
- Tallgrass
- Runestone
- The Long Journey Home

=== Non-fiction ===
- Horsin’ Around
- Horsin’ Around Again
- Still Horsin’ Around
