= M. H. Salmon =

American writer and publisher (1945–2019)

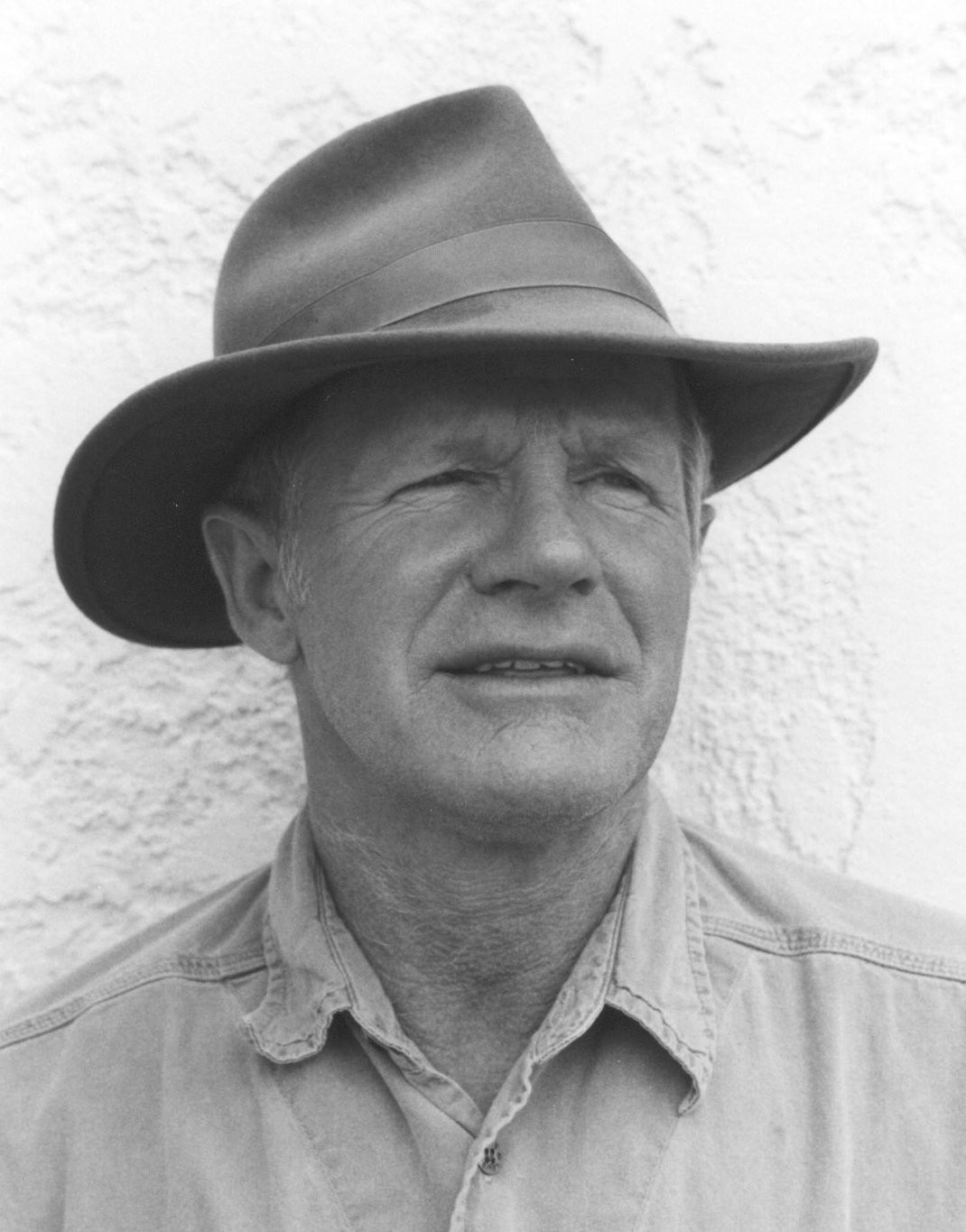
"Dutch" Salmon

Maynard Hubbard "Dutch" Salmon II (March 30, 1945 – March 10, 2019) was an American outdoor writer, publisher, and founder of High-Lonesome Books, a publishing company in Silver City, New Mexico. He was a conservationist, environmental activist, fisherman, and homesteader based in New Mexico. Salmon was also a coursing sighthound breeder, trainer, and hunter.

== Biography ==
M. H. Salmon was born in Syracuse, New York, on March 30, 1945. Salmon attended Nottingham High School in Syracuse, and The Winchendon School in Winchendon, Massachusetts. After a short stint at the University of Michigan, he transferred and graduated with a bachelor of arts degree in English and history from Trinity University in San Antonio in 1967.

Salmon taught school in the San Antonio area from 1968 to 1971 before moving to Minnesota to become an outdoorsman and writer. Salmon moved to southwest New Mexico in 1981 and began his work to preserve the free-flowing Gila River. Salmon died on March 10, 2019, in Las Cruces, New Mexico.

Salmon's father, John Pomeroy Salmon, fought in World War II with Edson's Raiders in the South Pacific. His 4th great-grandfather was Moses Van Campen, a veteran of the American Revolution, who fought the Native Americans in the frontier of western Pennsylvania.

== Conservation and environmentalism ==
In the spring of 1983, when the Gila River was in danger of being dammed, Salmon took a trip along the river where he was inspired to create what would later become his bestseller, Gila Descending. He co-founded the Gila Conservation Coalition in 1984 to protect the free flow of the Gila and San Francisco Rivers as well as the Gila and Aldo Leopold Wilderness areas.

The Gila Conservation Coalition successfully lobbied against the Hooker and Conner dams and Mangas diversion in the 1980s and 1990s. It helped to close the San Francisco River to motorized vehicles and kept the East Fork of the Gila River closed to the same.

Starting in 2001, Salmon opposed the diversion threat under the Arizona Water Settlements Act.

In January 2020, New Mexico senators Tom Udall and Martin Heinrich introduced the M. H. Dutch Salmon Greater Gila River Wild and Scenic Act to protect The Gila River.

== Affiliations ==
Salmon was a member of several commissions and boards throughout his life:

- New Mexico Interstate Stream Commission, 1985–1987
- Founder and chairman, Gila Conservation Coalition, 1984-2019
- Chairman, New Mexico Wilderness Coalition 1989–1995
- Board Member, Quivira Coalition 2000–2006
- Board Member, New Mexico Wildlife Federation 2005–2009
- Board Member, New Mexico Water Dialogue, 2007
- Board Member, Gila Resources Information Project 2004–2019
- Member, New Mexico State Game & Fish Commission, 2005-2011

Salmon received the Lifetime Conservation Award from the Gila Natural History Symposium in 2008. In 2009, he was awarded the Lifetime Conservation Award by the Gila Conservation Coalition. He received the Conservation Voters New Mexico's Local Conservation Hero Award in 2013. In 2014, the New Mexico Community Foundation awarded Salmon the Luminaria Award.

== Bibliography ==
=== Non-fiction ===
- Gazehounds & Coursing - An Illustrated Guide to the Art and Sport of Hunting with Sight Hounds (1st edition, 1977) Saint Cloud, MN, North Star Press, ISBN 0-878390243
- Tales of the Chase -- Hound Dogs, Catfish, and other Pursuits Afield, (1991) Silver City, NM, High-Lonesome Books, ISBN 978-0944383117
- The Catfish as Metaphor -- A Fisherman's American Journey, (1997) Silver City, NM, High-Lonesome Books, ISBN 0944383432
- Gazehounds & Coursing - The History, Art and Sport of Hunting with Sighthounds (expanded & revised 2nd edition, 1999) Silver City, NM, High-Lonesome Books, ISBN 0-944383-49-1 L
- Country Sports – The Rabid Pursuits of a Redneck Environmentalist, (2004) Silver City, NM, High-Lonesome Books, ISBN 094438367X
- Gila Libre: The Story of New Mexico’s Last Wild River, (2008) Albuquerque, NM, University of New Mexico Press, NM, ISBN 978-0826340825
- Gila Descending -- A Southwestern Journey, (4th edition, 2009) Silver City, NM, High-Lonesome Books, ISBN 978-0944383209
- Country Sports II – More Rabid Pursuits of a Redneck Environmentalist, (2015) Silver City, NM, High-Lonesome Books, ISBN 978-0944383810

=== Fiction ===
- Home is the River
- Signal to Depart
- Forty Freedoms

He was also the editor and publisher of the short-lived 1980s outdoors literary quarterly, Basin & Range.
