= Fred Grove =

Fred Grove (born Frederick Herridge; July 4, 1913 – September 2008) was a Native American author and winner of five prestigious "Spur Awards" from Western Writers of America for his western novels. He was born in Hominy, Oklahoma.

== Biography ==
Grove was the son of a Kansas cowboy and an Osage-Lakota woman born on the Pine Ridge Indian Reservation in South Dakota. His great-grandfather, Henry Chatillon, guided Francis Parkman on his tour of the Great Plains, from which evolved the classic book, The Oregon Trail. Grove was provoked into writing at an early age. The ten-year-old boy was visiting relatives in Fairfax, Oklahoma, when a wealthy Indian woman's house exploded, killing her and two family members. The novelist graphically recalled details the 1923 murder conspiracy to appropriate the woman's money. Grove's mother was Osage and Lakota, which thrust the tragedy into sharper focus. He remembers "the situation was lawless, with county officials apparently doing little to bring the guilty to justice." A subsequent FBI investigation resulted in prison sentences for two white men, one a cattleman and leading citizen of Fairfax — the other the son-in-law of the murdered woman.

He remembered, "Those were years of fear in Osage County," he said, "of rumors and threats. As a boy this intrigued me, angered me. I wanted to write about it someday, and air those wrongs." A number of years later, Grove met the FBI agent who directed the investigation, and they collaborated on a non-fiction book about the incident, but were unable to find a publisher. "It was very discouraging. I spent a year reading state newspapers on microfilm." The result of his extensive research were two novels, Warrior Road and Drum Without Warriors. The first novel was written from a Native American's point of view, the second from an FBI agent posing as a racehorse owner looking for match races, which sparked Grove's latent interest in quarterhorse racing. He also penned Apache novels, which he has continued to write into his 90s.

Determined to write, Grove earned his B.A. degree in journalism from the University of Oklahoma, class of 1937, where he was a sports editor of the student daily newspaper during his senior year. He later served as sports editor for two dailies before drifting into general news and desk work. "It was during the Depression and you felt lucky to have a job," he said. "My first one paid $18 a week and I was glad to have it." Grove had attempted to write westerns after World War II, and interviewed "a lot of Oklahoma pioneers" while working as a reporter for the Shawnee Morning News. "They were wonderful old people who had made the land runs in that state and remembered the 1870s and 80s. This further spurred my interest in the West."

He sold his first short story, "The Hangman Ghost" to .44 Western Magazine in 1951, and taught beginning reporting at the University of Oklahoma as well as a public relations course. There he took creative writing classes from Foster Harris and Walter Campbell (aka Stanley Vestal). He later served as public information director of the Oklahoma Educational Television Authority "until the politicians got hold of OETA, demanding that the staff perform like trained seals."

Grove quit his job and considered it the best career move he ever made. He then wrote his Osage novels and got into quarter horse racing. Flame of the Osage, his first novel, was sold when he was 45 and he said, his writing was more habit than compulsion. "I enjoy writing when I have a feel for the story. Writing hard takes a lot out of you. The finished novel is the real reward for me, a feeling of great relief."

Quarter horse racing became the subject of three of Grove's most successful books: The Great Horse Race, Bush Track, and Match Race. The first and last of these won awards.

Notable among Grove's later fiction is the series of five Jesse Wilder novels set during and after the American Civil War: Bitter Trumpet, Trail of Rogues, Man on a Red Horse, Into the Far Mountains, and A Soldier Returns.

(Source: Maverick Writers (ISBN 0-87004-331-5) by S. Jean Mead (aka Jean Henry-Mead).

== Awards ==
- 1963: Owen Wister Award
- Grove has won five Spur Awards, given annually by the Western Writers of America. He won three Spur Awards for novels and two for short stories:
  - 1961: Comanche Captives
  - 1962: "Comanche Woman"
  - 1968: "When the Caballos Came"
  - 1977: The Great Horse Race
  - 1982: Match Race
- Grove has also won two Western Heritage Awards, given annually by the National Cowboy & Western Heritage Museum:
  - 1961: "Comanche Son"
  - 1968: The Buffalo Runners
- Grove received a Distinguished Service Award from Western New Mexico University for his fiction set on the Apache frontier.

== Bibliography ==
=== Novels ===
- Flame of the Osage (1958)
- Sun Dance (1958)
- No Bugles, No Glory (1959)
- Comanche Captives (1961)
- The Land Seekers (1963)
- Buffalo Spring (1967)
- The Buffalo Runners (1968)
- War Journey (1971)
- The Child Stealers (1973)
- Warrior Road (1974)
- Sanaco (1974)
- Drum Without Warriors (1976)
- The Great Horse Race (1977)
- Bush Track (1978) (sequel to "The Great Horse Race")
- The Running Horses (1980)
- The Phantom Warrior (1981)
- Match Race (1982)
- A Far Trumpet (1985)
- Search for the Breed (1986)
- Deception Trail (1988)
- Bitter Trumpet (1989)
- Trail of Rogues (1993)
- Man on a Red Horse (1998)
- Into the Far Mountains (1999)
- Destiny Valley (2000)
- A Distance of Ground (2000)
- The Years of Fear (2002)
- The Spring of Valor (2003)
- A Soldier Returns (2006)
- Trouble Hunter (2006)

=== Short story collections ===
- Red River Stage: Western Stories (2001)
- The Vanishing Raiders: Western Stories (2005)
- Savage Land: Western Stories (2010)
