= Elisabeth Haseloff =

German Lutheran pastor

Elisabeth Haseloff (1914–1974) was a German Lutheran pastor. In 1958, in accordance with revised legislation, she was chosen to serve as a pastor in Lübeck. On Easter Sunday 1959, she was ceremoniously appointed to head the city's Evangelical Women's Association, becoming the first woman in Germany to hold the title of pastor. She maintained the position until she died in an accident in 1974.

== Biography ==
Born on 30 June 1914 in Rome, Elisabeth Haseloff was the daughter of Arthur Haseloff (1872–1955), an art historian. She was brought up in a cultural environment in Kiel, meeting numerous figures associated with art and science. When she was 14, deeply moved by her confirmation, she resolved to study theology. As a result, in 1935 she embarked on her studies at the University of Tübingen.

During the Nazi era, she became a member of the Confessing Church. After taking her first theological examination in 1939, she gained practical experience of clerical work at St Anschar's Church in Neumünster. She was particularly active in caring for hospital patients but also preached on occasion, although it was against the rules. She was not supposed to do more than hold Bible classes but during the war, it was not unusual for women to deliver sermons.

She took the second theology exam in 1941, becoming the first woman to do so in Schleswig-Holstein. After assisting the pastor in Büdelsdorf, in the absence of male pastors, in 1946 she was entrusted with responsibility for the parish. She remained in Büdelsdorf until 1959.

In the late 1950s, there was a vacancy for a pastor in one of the parishes in Lübeck. Realizing that Haseloff could fill the post, the synod drafted a "church law for the parochial employment of a female pastor", the first of its kind in Germany. On Whit Sunday 1959, she was installed as the first female pastor in the Evangelical Church of Germany, a development which was widely reported in the press.

She turned out to be very effective in her new position, arranging seminars on collaboration between men and women in the church, inviting women politicians, doctors, trade unionists and teachers. She was also active in arranging meetings between women in East and West Germany and in collaboration with Africa. In 1962, she invited three Tanzanian women to study in Lübeck as kindergarten teachers, hosting them in her own home.

On 29 November 1974, Elisabeth Haseloff met with a fatal accident in Hamburg while crossing the street on a zebra crossing.
