= Wayne D. Overholser =

American Western writer (1906–1996)

Wayne D. Overholser (September 4, 1906, in Pomeroy, Washington – August 27, 1996, in Boulder, Colorado), was an American Western writer. Overholser won the 1953 First Spur Award for Best Western Novel for Law Man using the pseudonym Lee Leighton. Law Man was made into the motion picture Star in the Dust, starring John Agar and Richard Boone (and Clint Eastwood in his first - uncredited - Western role), in 1956. In 1955 he won the 1954 (second) Spur Award for The Violent Land. He won the Spur Award for a third time in 1969 for his juvenile novel about the Meeker Massacre, with Lewis Patten. Three additional pseudonyms were John S. Daniels, Dan J. Stevens and Joseph Wayne; combinations of his three sons' names.

== Early life ==
Overholser grew up on two different farms in the Willamette Valley of Oregon. He graduated from Pleasant Hill High School in 1924. He first attended Albany College, then the Oregon Normal School. He taught school in Tillamook and Bend.

Overholser attended summer school from 1927-1934, taking botany classes and studying under writing professor W. F. G. Thacher (who also mentored Ernest Haycox, whom Overholser cited as an influence) at the University of Oregon, graduating in 1934 with a bachelor of science degree. He married Evaleth Miller in 1934, and the couple traveled to Missoula, Montana in 1935 where Wayne studied with E. Douglas Branch and Robert Penn Warren.

He sold his first story to Popular Western, a pulp magazine, in 1936.

== In popular culture ==
Overholser was referenced in Stephen King's novel Wolves of the Calla, part of King's Dark Tower, in which he was both mentioned explicitly, and is the namesake of a character in the town of Calla Bryn Sturgis.

== Work ==
credits	title	year	publisher	comment
Wayne D. Overholser	Buckaroo's Code	1947
Wayne D. Overholser	West of the Rimrock	1949
Wayne D. Overholser	Draw or Drag	1950
Joseph Wayne	The Snake Stomper	1951
Lee Leighton	Law Man	1953
Dan J. Stevens	Wild Horse Range	1953	Ace
Wayne D. Overholser	Steel to the South	1953
Wayne D. Overholser	Fabulous Gunman	1954
John S. Daniels	The Nester	1954
Lee Leighton	Beyond the Pass	1956
Wayne D. Overholser	Cast a Long Shadow	1957
Wayne D. Overholser	The Lone Deputy	1960
Wayne D. Overholser	The Killer Marshal	1961
Wayne D. Overholser	Standoff at the River	1961
Wayne D. Overholser	War in Sandoval County	1961
Wayne D. Overholser	The Bitter Night	1962
Wayne D. Overholser	The Judas Gun	1962
Wayne D. Overholser	The Trial of Billy Peale	1963
Wayne D. Overholser	A Gun for Johnny Deere	1964
Wayne D. Overholser	To the Far Mountains	1964
Wayne D. Overholser	Day of Judgement	1965
Wayne D. Overholser	Colorado Incident	-		reissue of Day of Judgement
Lee Leighton	Big Ugly	1966
Wayne D. Overholser	Ride Into Danger	1967
Wayne D. Overholser	Summer of the Sioux	1967
Lee Leighton	Hanging at Pulpit Rock	1967
Wayne D. Overholser	North to Deadwood	1968
Wayne D. Overholser	Dakota Jones	1969		German translation of North to Deadwood
Wayne D. Overholser	The Meeker Massacre	1969		with Lewis B Patten
Lee Leighton	You'll never hang me	1971
Wayne D. Overholser	The Noose	1972
Wayne D. Overholser	The Long Trail North	1973
Wayne D. Overholser	Brand 99	1974
Wayne D. Overholser	Diablo Ghost	1978
Wayne D. Overholser	The Trouble Kid	1978
Wayne D. Overholser	The Cattle Queen Feud	1979
Lee Leighton	Cassidy	1980
Wayne D. Overholser	Sun on the Wall	1981
Wayne D. Overholser	Mason County War	1981
Wayne D. Overholser	Dangerous Patrol	1982
Wayne D. Overholser	The Long Wind	1986
Wayne D. Overholser	Bunch Grass	1986
Wayne D. Overholser	Gunplay Valley: The Sweet And Bitter Land	1987
Wayne D. Overholser	Return of the Kid	1987
Wayne D. Overholser	By Gun and Spur	1987
Wayne D. Overholser	Red Snow	1988
Wayne D. Overholser	The Dry Gulcher	1988
Wayne D. Overholser	Gunlock	1988
Wayne D. Overholser	Red Is the Valley	1988
Wayne D. Overholser	Land of Promises	1989
Wayne D. Overholser	Proud Journey	1989
Wayne D. Overholser	Valley of Guns	1991
Wayne D. Overholser	Cast a Long Shadow	1991
Wayne D. Overholser	Desperate Man	1992
Wayne D. Overholser	The Violent Land	1992
Wayne D. Overholser	Hearn's Valley	1992
Wayne D. Overholser	Tough Hand	1992
Wayne D. Overholser	The Hunted	1994
Wayne D. Overholser	The Patriarch of Gunsight Flat	1996
Wayne D. Overholser	They Hanged Wild Bill Murphy	1996
Wayne D. Overholser	Nightmare in Broken Bow	1997
Wayne D. Overholser	Nugget City	1997
John S. Daniels	War Party	1997
Wayne D. Overholser	The Violent Men	1997
Wayne D. Overholser	Riders of the Sundowns	1997
Wayne D. Overholser	Buckskin Man	1998
Wayne D. Overholser	The Petticoat Brigade	1998
Wayne D. Overholser	Oregon Trunk	1998
Wayne D. Overholser	Chumley's Gold	1999
Wayne D. Overholser	Ride the Red Trail	2000
Wayne D. Overholser	Tales of the West	2000
Wayne D. Overholser	Gunflame	2000
Wayne D. Overholser	The Outlaws	2000
Wayne D. Overholser	Gateway House	2001
Wayne D. Overholser	Revenge in Crow City	2001
Wayne D. Overholser	Rainbow Rider	2001
Wayne D. Overholser	The Day the Killers Came	2002
Wayne D. Overholser	The Three Sons of Adam Jones	2003
Wayne D. Overholser	The Bad Man	2003
Wayne D. Overholser	Wild Horse River	2003
Wayne D. Overholser	The Law at Miles City	2004
Wayne D. Overholser	Bitter Wind	2006
Lee Leighton	Fight for the Valley	2007
Lee Leighton	Tomahawk	2009
Wayne D. Overholser	Pass Creek Valley	2009
Wayne D. Overholser	Shadow on the Land	2009
Wayne D. Overholser	Law at Angel's Landing	2010
Wayne D. Overholser	The Man from Yesterday	2010
Wayne D. Overholser	Death of a Cattle King	2011
Wayne D. Overholser	Ten Mile Valley	2012
Wayne D. Overholser	The Waiting Gun	2013
Wayne D. Overholser	Swampland Empire	2013

Collections

- The Best Western Stories of Wayne D. Overholser (1984) aka The Best Western Stories
