= Elmer Kelton =

American journalist and writer

Elmer Stephen Kelton
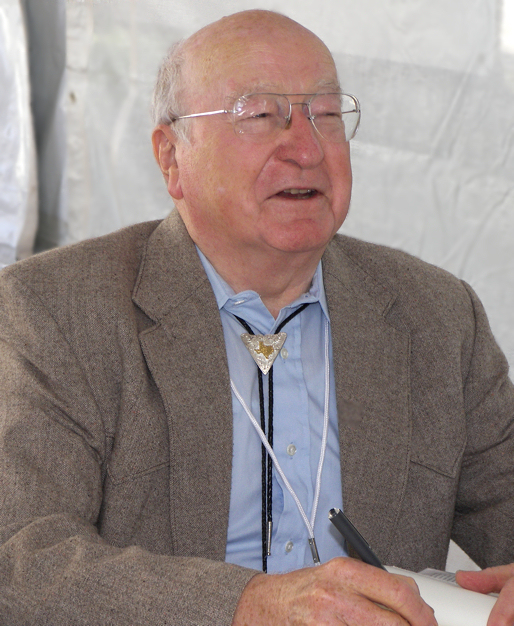
- Kelton at the 2007 Texas Book Festival
- Born: April 29, 1926; Five Wells Ranch, Andrews County, Texas, U.S.
- Died: August 22, 2009 (aged 83); San Angelo, Texas, U.S.
- Education: University of Texas at Austin
- Occupations: Journalist; writer; novelist
- Spouse: Anna (née Lipp) Kelton
- Children: 3
- Writing career
- Period: 1957–2009
- Genre: Westerns
- Website: elmerkelton.net

Elmer Kelton (April 29, 1926 – August 22, 2009) was an American author, known for his Westerns. He was born in Andrews County, Texas.

He graduated from the University of Texas in 1948. Kelton worked as the farm and ranch editor of the San Angelo Standard-Times from 1948 to 1963. He served as the associate editor of Livestock Weekly from 1968 to 1990. Kelton's memoir, Sandhills Boy, was published in 2007.

Kelton's novels won seven Spur Awards, from the Western Writers of America, and three Western Heritage Awards, from the National Cowboy & Western Heritage Museum. He also received a Owen Wister Award for lifetime achievement.

== Awards ==
Year	Award	Category	Work
1957	Spur Award	Novel	Buffalo Wagons
1971	Spur Award	Novel	The Day the Cowboys Quit
1973	Spur Award	Novel	The Time It Never Rained
1974	Western Heritage Award	Western Novel	The Time It Never Rained
1977	Owen Wister Award	Western literature	Lifetime achievement
1979	Western Heritage Award	Western Novel	The Good Old Boys
1981	Spur Award	Novel	Eyes of the Hawk
1988	Western Heritage Award	Western Novel	The Man Who Rode Midnight
1992	Spur Award	Novel of the West	Slaughter
1994	Spur Award	Novel of the West	The Far Canyon
2002	Spur Award	Best Western Novel	Way of the Coyote
2010 (posthumously)	American Cowboy Culture Association	Fictional works	Lifetime achievement

== Bibliography ==
Partial list of works:

- Barbed Wire (1957)
- Buffalo Wagons (1957)
- Shadow of a Star (1958)
- Texas Rifles (1960)
- Donovan (1961)
- Massacre at Goliad (1965)
- After the Bugles (1967)
- Llano River (1968)
- The Day the Cowboys Quit (1971)
- Wagontongue (1972)
- The Time it Never Rained (1973)
- The Wolf and the Buffalo (1980)
- Dark Thicket (1985)
- Honor at Daybreak (1991)
- Slaughter (1992)
- The Far Canyon (1994)
- The Pumpkin Rollers (1996)
- Cloudy in the West (1997)
- The Smiling Country (1998)
- Way of the Coyote (2001)
- Jericho's Road (2004)
- Six Bits a Day (2005)
- Ranger's Law: A Lone Star Saga (2006)
- The Rebels: Sons of Texas (2007)
- Many A River (2009)

Texas Ranger novels:

- The Buckskin Line
- Badger Boy
- The Way of the Coyote
- Ranger's Trail
- Texas Vendetta
- Jericho's Road
- Hard Trail to Follow
- Other Men's Horses
- Texas Standoff
