= Dale L. Walker =

American historian (1935–2015)

- Born: August 3, 1935; Decatur, Illinois, U.S.
- Died: December 7, 2015 (aged 80); El Paso, Texas, U.S.
- Education: University of Texas at El Paso
- Occupations: Writer; historian
- Spouse: Alice McCord
- Children: 5

Dale L. Walker (August 3, 1935 – December 7, 2015) was an American writer. He was born in Decatur, Illinois, but spent most of his life in El Paso, Texas. The author of twenty-three books, he also served as a television reporter, editor, news and information officer, university press director, freelance writer, biographer, and historian. He was past president of Western Writers of America (WWA).

== Biography ==
As a boy growing up in the farm town of Decatur, Illinois, Walker was inspired by the writings of Jack London, and has written extensively about the author. Walker began his writing career by working for his high school newspaper, and found various journalistic jobs throughout his youth. He enlisted in the navy at 18 and upon discharge visited his father, a career army sergeant, at Fort Bliss, Texas, and subsequently enrolled at the University of Texas at El Paso where he earned his degree in journalism within three years. By then he had married Alice McCord, fathered the first of five children, and earned a number of freelance publishing credits.

== Writing career ==
Walker's freelance writing career began in earnest in 1960 while a college student working part-time at a television reporting job in El Paso. He wrote frequently for newspapers and magazines. His work, close to 2,000 published pieces appeared in 130 periodicals.

His first big break came in 1967 when his mentor, the late Richard O'Connor, invited him to collaborate on a biography of radical journalist John Reed. Harcourt, Brace and World published the work as The Lost Revolutionary, which was reviewed by The New York Times. Walker waited 36 years for his second New York Times review, this one for his gold rush book, Eldorado, in 2003.

Walker wrote pre-Civil War history as well as western and military history. His book, Mary Edwards Walker: Above and Beyond (2005) is a biography of the Civil War, his The Boys of '98: Theodore Roosevelt and the Rough Riders (1998) received high praise as had his Bear Flag Rising: The Conquest of California (1999), which told of events that led to the annexation of California in 1846 when the territory was a Mexican province, and Pacific Destiny: The Three-Century Journey to the Oregon Country (2000), which won a Spur Award from Western Writers of America, as had three additional Walker works.

His best writings were biographies such as Januarius MacGahan The Life and Campaigns of an American War Correspondent (1988), which he regarded as his best book.

Walker was a member of the Texas Institute of Letters and the Author's Guild as well as Western Writers of America, Inc.

== Bibliography ==
- The Lost Revolutionary: A Biography Of John Reed [with Richard O'Connor], New York, NY: Harcourt, Brace & World, 1967.
- The Fiction of Jack London: A Chronicle Bibliography [with James E. Sisson II], El Paso, TX: Texas Western Press, 1972.
- C. L. Sonnichsen: Grassroots Historian, El Paso, TX: Texas Western Press, 1972.
- Death Was the Black Horse: The Story of Rough Rider, Buckey O'Neill, Austin, TX: Madrona Press, 1975.
- No Mentor but Myself: Jack London on Writing and Writers, Port Washington, NY: Kennikat Press, 1975.
- Curious Fragments: Jack London's Tales of Fantasy, Port Washington, NY: Kennikat Press, 1975.
- Only the Clouds Remain: Ted Parsons of the Lafayette Escadrille, Amsterdam, NY: Alandale Press, 1980.
- Jack London and Conan Doyle: A Literary Kinship, Bloomingdale, IN: Gaslight Publications, 1981.
- Will Henry's West, El Paso, TX: Texas Western Press, 1984.
- In a Far Country: Jack London's Tales of the West, Ottawa, IL: Jameson Books, 1987.
- Januarius MacGahan: The Life and Campaigns of an American War Correspondent, Athens, OH: Ohio University Press, 1988.
- Mavericks: Ten Uncorralled Westerners, Phoeniz, AZ: Golden West Press, [October] 1989.
- The Golden Spurs, New York, NY: Tor Books, 1991.
- Legends of the Wild West, Chicago, IL: Publications Inaternational, Ltd., 1995.
- Legends and Lies: Great Mysteries of the American West, New York, NY: Forge Books, 1997.
- The Western Hall of Fame Anthology, New York, NY: Berkley Books, 1997.
- The Boys of '98: Theodore Roosevelt and the Rough Riders, New York, NY: Forge Books, 1998.
- Bear Flag Rising: The Conquest of California, 1846, New York, NY: Forge Books, 1999.
- Pacific Destiny: The Three-Century Journey to the Oregon Country, New York, NY: Forge Books, 2000.
- Eldorado: The California Gold Rush, 1848-1852. New York, NY: Forge Books. 2003. ISBN 978-0-312-87833-7 – via Internet Archive.
- Westward: A Fictional History of the American West, New York, NY: Forge Book, 2004.
- The Calamity Papers: Western Myths and Cold Cases, New York, NY: Forge Books, 2004.
- Mary Edwards Walker: Above and Beyond, New York, NY: Forge Books, 2005.
