= Peter Bowen =

American writer (1945–2020)

- Born: May 22, 1945
- Died: April 8, 2020 (aged 74)
- Occupation: Writer

Peter Bowen (May 22, 1945 – April 8, 2020) was an American writer born May 22, 1945, possibly in Atlanta, Georgia, where he was adopted by Keith and Marie Elizabeth (Theim) Bowen. He died April 8, 2020, in Livingston, Montana.

He lived in Livingston, Montana, and had worked as a cowboy, hunting and fishing guide, folksinger, poet, essayist, and novelist. He was the author of the Yellowstone Kelly historical novels as well as the Gabriel Du Pré mysteries. He also wrote humor and hunting articles under the pseudonym "Coyote Jack" for Forbes FYI magazine.

He was married to an old friend, Christine Whiteside, in 2013.

Bowen died on April 8, 2020, at the age of 74.

== Works ==
=== Yellowstone Kelly novels ===
- Yellowstone Kelly: Gentleman and Scout, 1987
- Kelly Blue, 1991
- Imperial Kelly, 1992
- Kelly and the Three-toed Horse, 2001

=== Gabriel Du Pré mysteries ===
- Coyote Wind, 1994
- Specimen Song, 1995
- Wolf, No Wolf, 1996
- Notches, 1997
- Thunder Horse, 1998
- Long Son, 1999
- The Stick Game, 2000
- Cruzatte and Maria, 2001
- Ash Child, 2002
- Badlands, 2003
- The Tumbler, 2004
- Stewball, 2005
- Nails, 2006
- Bitter Creek, 2015
- Solus, 2018
