= Jeff Sadler =

English writer

- Born: Geoffrey Willis Sadler; October 7, 1943; Mansfield Woodhouse, Nottinghamshire
- Died: December 6, 2005 (aged 62); Calow, Derbyshire
- Occupations: Novelist, essayist
- Writing career
- Pen name: Jeff Sadler, Geoff Sadler, Wes Calhoun÷
- Genre: Western fiction

Geoffrey Willis Sadler (1943–2005) was an English novelist, essayist and editor, most famous for his western novels published under the pen name Jeff Sadler.

== Life ==
Geoffrey Willis Sadler was born on 7 October 1943 in Mansfield Woodhouse, Nottinghamshire. He started work as a library assistant in 1960 and worked as a librarian at Staveley, Shirebrook, Bolsover, and Chesterfield, where he remained for nineteen years. He was a prolific writer of local history books on Shirebrook and Chesterfield, as well as an editor, although the largest part of his work is made of western novels.

Sadler married in 1965 and had two sons. He died in Chesterfield in 2005, after two years suffering from motor neurone disease.

== Work ==
=== Work as editor ===
Sadler as editor to the second edition of Twentieth Century Western Writers, a comprehensive index listing 467 authors of western fiction. In their review, Library Journal lauded the effort in adding many female names to the previous edition (such as Jessamyn West, Rose Wilder Lane, and Bess Streeter Aldrich), "evidence of the contributors' stated revisionist attitude toward the history of the American Western novel".

=== Outside the western genre ===
In 1982, Sadler penned the "Justus" trilogy of novels, dealing with the life of the eponymous slave. These novels were signed under his birth name, Geoffrey Sadler, and published by New English Library.

Starting in the 1990s Sadler became a prolific writer of local history books on Shirebrook and Chesterfield, such as two volumes on local crime: Foul Deeds and Suspicious Deaths in and Around Chesterfield and Foul Deeds and Suspicious Deaths in and Around Mansfield.

As an essayist, Sadler wrote on poets Ruth Fainlight and Daniel Weissbort, and was a contributor to The Routledge Encyclopedia of Jewish Writers of the Twentieth Century and Twentieth-Century Romance and Gothic Writers.

== Bibliography ==
=== Westerns ===
==== As Jeff Sadler ====
- Arizona Blood-Trail (1981)
- Sonora Lode (1982)
- Tamaulipas Guns (1982)
- Severo Siege (1983)
- Lobo Moon (1983)
- Sierra Showdown (1983)
- Throw of a Rope (1984)
- Manhunt in Chihuahua (1985)
- Return of Amarillo (1986)
- Montana Mine (1987)
- Saltillo Road (1987)
- Long Gun War (1988)
- Palomino Stud (1988)
- Ghost Town Guns (1990)
- Headed North (1992)
- Matamoros Mission (1993)
- Hangrope Journey (1994)
- Bayou Gunsmoke (1995)
- Yaqui Justice (1997)
- Soledad (1999)
- Apache Ransom (2001)
- Vulture Peak (2001)
- North From Idaho (2004)
- Yuma Breakout (with B.J. Holmes) (2008)

==== As Wes Calhoun ====
- Chulo (1988)
- At Muerto Springs (1989)
- Texas Nighthawks (1990)
- Sierra Trail (1993)
- Natchez Guns (2000)
- Graveyard Ride (2002)

=== Other genres ===
- The Lash (1982) (Justus #1)
- Bloodwater (1982) (Justus #2)
- Black Vengeance (1982) (Justus #3)

=== Non-fiction ===
- Queen's Park: The First Sixty Years, 1887-1947 (with A. Snarski)(1989)
- Journey to Freedom (1990)
- The Rendezvous Dance Hall: A History (with E.I. Roberts) (1990)
- Shirebrook: Birth of a Colliery (1991)
- Shirebrook in Old Picture Postcards (1993)
- Shirebrook (1994)
- Shirebrook: A Second Selection (1995)
- Who Was Who: The Black & Whites (2000)
- Chesterfield History and Guide (2001)

==== As editor ====
- Twentieth Century Western Writers, 2nd ed. (1991)
- Write First Time (1992)
- Ralph Batteson: St. Nazaire to Shepperton: A Sailor's Odyssey (1996)
- Aspects of Chesterfield (2002)
