= Bad Country (novel) =

2014 American mystery novel by C. B. McKenzie

- Author: C. B. McKenzie
- Audio read by: Mark Bramhall
- Language: English
- Genre: Mystery
- Published: 2014
- Publisher: Minotaur Books
- Publication place: United States
- Pages: 304
- ISBN: 9781250053541

Bad Country is an American mystery novel written by C. B. McKenzie.

== Plot ==
Rodeo Grace Garnet, an Arizona bounty hunter and private detective, is hired by an elderly Indian woman to help discover who murdered her grandson.

== Reception ==
Bad Country was called "elegantly told" by the New York Times. It received a starred review from Kirkus Reviews. It was also reviewed by Library Journal. It won the Hillerman Prize. Stephen King tweeted that he liked the author's "fresh and original voice."
