= Harlan Howard Thompson =

American writer

Harlan Howard Thompson (December 25, 1894 – October 9, 1987) was an author of children's books. He was a member of International PEN, a worldwide association of authors, and was its international president from 1958–59, as well as the Western Writers of America and other organizations. He published the novel Prairie Colt using the pseudonym Stephen Holt.

Thompson was born December 25, 1894, in Brewster, Kansas. He attended South Pasadena High School in California. He then attended the University of Southern California from 1917 to 1919, which houses his papers.

Among Thompson's novels are Prairie Colt, which was awarded the Boys Clubs of America gold medal in 1947, Stormy, We Were There With The California Forty-niners, Wild Palomino and many other juvenile western books. Spook the Mustang won the silver medal in fiction in the 1956 California Book Awards.

For many years, he owned the TX Ranch in Alberta, Canada. He died on October 9, 1987, in Pasadena, California.
