= Sandra Dallas =

American author

Sandra Dallas is an American author of fiction, young adult fiction novels, children's fiction books, and nonfiction books. Prior to her career as an independent author, she was a reporter and bureau chief for BusinessWeek magazine for the Denver region. She is a 2003 recipient of the Spur Award for Best Western Novel and a 2008 recipient of the Spur Award for Best Western Short Novel.

== Biography ==
Dallas received a degree in journalism from the University of Denver. She was a reporter for BusinessWeek for 25 years, and was the magazine's first female bureau chief. She began writing in the 1970s during her time as a reporter. She lives in Denver with her husband Bob and has two grown daughters.

== Awards & honors ==
- New York Times best-seller list for Prayers for Sale and True Sisters
- Independent Book Publishers Association's Benjamin Franklin Award for The Quilt that Walked to Golden
- National Cowboy Hall of Fame Western Heritage Wrangler Award for Sacred Paint
- "A quintessential American voice" - Jane Smiley, Vogue
- Spur Award for Best Western Novel, 2003
- Spur Award for Best Western Short Novel, 2008

== Works ==
=== Novels ===
- Tough Luck (April 2025)
- Where Coyotes Howl (April 2023)
- Little Souls (April 2022)
- Westering Women (January 2020)
- The Patchwork Bride (June 2018)
- The Last Midwife (September 2015)
- A Quilt for Christmas (October 2014)
- Fallen Women (October 2013)
- True Sisters (April 2012)
- The Bride's House (May 2011)
- Whiter Than Snow (March 2010)
- Prayers for Sale (April 2009)
- Tallgrass (February 2008)
- New Mercies (February 2006)
- The Chili Queen (February 2003)
- Alice's Tulips (October 2000)
- The Diary of Mattie Spenser (May 1998)
- Prayers for Sale (April 1997)
- The Persian Pickle Club (October 1995)
- Buster Midnight's Cafe (April 1990)

=== Children's/Young Adult Novels ===
- Tenmile (December 2022)
- Someplace to Call Home (August 2019)
- Hardscrabble (March 2018)
- Red Berries, White Clouds, Blue Sky (September 2014)
- The Quilt Walk (September 2012)

=== Non-Fiction ===
- The Quilt That Walked to Golden (September 2007)
- Colorado's Homes (October 1986)
- Colorado Ghost Towns and Mining Camps (March 1985)
- Sacred Paint: Ned Jacob (January 1979)
- Yesterday's Denver (December 1973)
- Cherry Creek Gothic: Victorian Architecture in Denver (May 1971)
- Gaslights and Gingerbread (January 1965)
- No More Than Five in a Bed: Colorado Hotels in the Old Days (July 1962)
