= Hasselhoff =

Hasselhoff is a surname of German, Austrian and Dutch roots. Notable people with this surname include the following:

- David Hasselhoff (born 1952), American actor and singer
  - Hayley Hasselhoff (born 1992), American actress, daughter of David
- Jared Hasselhoff (born 1971), American musician
