= Robert J. Conley =

Cherokee author

Robert J. Conley (December 29, 1940 – February 16, 2014) was a Cherokee author. In 2007, he received the Lifetime Achievement Award from the Native Writers' Circle of the Americas.

Conley was born in Cushing, Oklahoma on December 29, 1940. He was an enrolled citizen of the United Keetoowah Band of Cherokee Indians, a federally recognized tribe of American Indians. He is noted for depictions of precontact and historical Cherokee figures. He is known for a series of books called the Real People Series. The sixth of the series, The Dark Island (1996) won the Spur Award for best Western novel in 1995. He has also won two other Spur Awards, in 1988 for the short story "Yellow Bird", and in 1992 for the novel Nickajack. In 2010, Robert Conley became the first American Indian to lead the Western Writers of America, at Western Carolina University, Cullowhee, North Carolina. Conley died in Sylva, North Carolina.

== Books ==
- No Need for a Gunfighter, Dorchester. (2008)
- Cherokee Thoughts: Honest and Uncensored, University of Oklahoma Press.
- A Cherokee Encyclopedia, University of New Mexico Press.
- The Cherokee Nation: A History, Univ. New Mexico Pr.
- Cherokee Medicine Man: The Life And Work Of A Modern-day Healer, University of Oklahoma Press. Selected by the American Library Association as one of the Outstanding Academic Titles of the Year.
- Cherokee, with David Fitzgerald (Photographer), Graphics Arts Center Pub.
- Sequoyah, St. Martin's Press.
- The Devil's Trail, St. Martin's Press.
- Medicine War, Signet.
- Spanish Jack, St. Martin's Press.
- A Cold, Hard Trail, St. Martin's Press.
- The Gunfighter, Leisure Press.
- Broke Loose, Leisure Press.
- Fugitive's Trail, St. Martin's Press.
- Barjack, Leisure Books.
- Cherokee Dragon, St. Martin's Press.
- Brass, Leisure Books.
- Incident at Buffalo Crossing, Leisure Books.
- The Meade Solution, University of Colorado Press.
- The Peace Chief, St. Martin's Press.
- The Actor, Leisure Books.
- War Woman: A Novel of the Real People, Griffin Trade.
- Back to Malachi, Leisure Books.
- Border Line, Pocket Books.
- Captain Dutch, Pocket Books.
- Crazy Snake, Pocket Books.
- The Dark Island, Bantam Books.
- Geronimo, an American Legend; A Novel, Pocket Books.
- Go-Ahead Rider, Pocket Books.
- Killing Time (An Evans Novel of the West), M Evans & Co.
- The Long Trail North, Pocket Books.
- Mountain Windsong: A Novel of the Trail of Tears, Univ of Oklahoma Press.
- Ned Christie's War, St. Martin's Press.
- Outside the Law, Pocket Books.
- To Make a Killing, Pocket Books.
- The War Trail North: Real People, Book #07, Bantam Books.
- The Way South; The Real People, Book IV, Bantam Books.
- The Witch of Goingsnake and Other Stories, Univ of Oklahoma Press.
- Zeke Proctor: Cherokee Outlaw, Pocket Books.
- The Dark Way, Bantam Books.
- The Long Way Home; Real People Book 5, Bantam Books.
- Rattlesnake Band and Other Poems, Indiana University Press.
- The Actor (A Double d Western Book), Doubleday.
- Colfax, Ballantine Books.
- Nickajack, Bantam Books.
- Quitting Time, Pocket Books.
- The Saga of Henry Starr, Ballantine Books.
- Strange Company, Pocket Books.
- The Way of the Priests, Bantam Books.
- The White Path (The Real People, Book 3), Bantam Books.
- Wilder and Wilder, Random House (Paper).
- Echoes of Our Being, (Editor), Indian University Press, 1982.
- "Adwosgi, Swimmer Wesley Snell: A Cherokee Memorial", The Blue Cloud Quarterly Press, 1980.
- 21 Poems, Aux Arcs Press, 1975.
- The Essay: Structure and Purpose, Edited with Richard Cherry and Bernard Hirsch, 1975, Houghton Mifflin.
- A Return to Vision, Edited with Richard Cherry and Bernard Hirsch, 1971, 1974, Houghton Mifflin.
- The Shadow Within, Edited with Richard Cherry and Bernard Hirsch, 1973, Houghton Mifflin.
- Poems for Comparison and Contrast, Edited with Richard Cherry, 1972, Houghton Mifflin.
