= Louis J. Stellman =

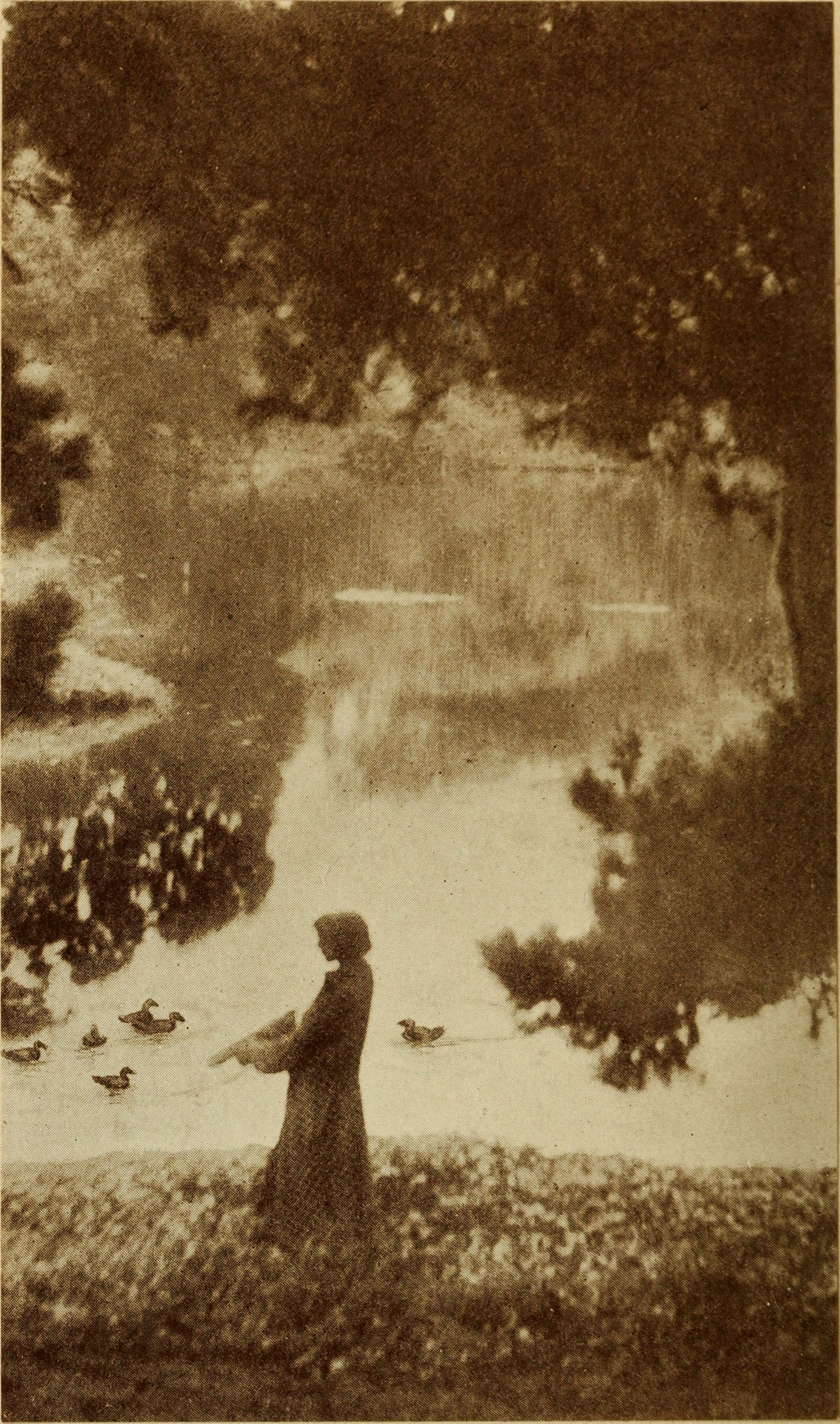
A photograph of Golden Gate Park from Katie in Birdland (1917)

Louis J. Stellman or Stellmann (January 6, 1877 – 1961) was a photographer, newspaper columnist, biographer, painter and poet.

He was born Baltimore, Maryland and went to California in July 1896. By 1926 he was living in Menlo Park, California. Connected with the San Francisco Examiner by 1897, he also wrote "Observer" sketches for the Los Angeles Herald. These sketches were published in book form as Said the Observer in 1903.

Stellmann was a protégé of Arnold Genthe and produced a significant portfolio of photographs in San Francisco's Chinatown between 1906 and the beginning of World War II. His photographs appear in Chinatown photographer, Louis J. Stellmann: a catalog of his photograph collection, edited by Gary E. Strong.

== Published works ==
Stellman's books include:

- Mate o'dreams and Other Poems
- Mother Lode; The Story of California's Gold Rush
- Port O' Gold A History-Romance of the San Francisco Argonauts
- Said the Observer
- Sam Brannan, Builder of San Francisco; A Biography
- That Was a Dream Worth Building; the Spirit of San Francisco's Great Fair Portrayed in Pictures and Words
- The Vanished Ruin Eta; San Francisco's Classic Artistry of Ruin Depicted in Picture and Song
