= Gary Svee =

American author and journalist (1943–2019)

- Born: November 11, 1943; Billings, Montana, U.S.
- Died: July 14, 2019 (aged 75)
- Occupation: Writer
- Spouse: Diane
- Children: Darren; Nathan
- Writing career
- Language: English
- Genre: Westerns
- Notable work: Sanctuary

Gary Svee (November 11, 1943 – July 14, 2019) was an American author and journalist, known for his Westerns. He was born in Billings, Montana, growing up on the banks of the Yellowstone, Rosebud and Stillwater rivers, and was a graduate of the University of Montana's School of Journalism.

Svee was a former editorial director for the Billings (Montana) Gazette. He was on the newspaper's staff in 1993, when the town suffered a wave of vicious racial and religious hatred. Citizens who attended a Martin Luther King Jr. Day commemoration returned to their cars to find racist literature on them. Swastikas were painted on a Native American family's home, Ku Klux Klan flyers were openly distributed, the Billings Jewish cemetery was desecrated and a brick was hurled through the window of a Jewish family whose six-year-old son put the family's Menorah in it for Hanukkah.

The people of Billings banded together, with volunteers re-painting the home and ridding it of the hate-filled graffiti; religious groups held marches and those who were not members of a particular religion began attending other services in addition to their own, to show unity and support for each other. The Billings Gazette printed a full page depiction of a Menorah, asking residents to put the page up in their businesses and homes. Svee related how the image was chosen for the paper, saying, "I guess it was a question of looking for an image to put this together. During the second World War, the Danish King is reputed to have come out after the Jewish community was forced to wear stars by the Nazi occupiers, that he was reported to have come out with a yellow star too."

While hundreds of residents displayed the newspaper's Menorah, the incidents were still occurring. The Billings Chief of Police, Gary Inman, issued a challenge to the town's citizens: for every instance of vandalism, ten more people should display the picture of the Menorah; by the end of December, 1993, there were over 10,000 Menorah images openly displayed in the town. The wave of hatred ended. Svee was one of those who worked with the Institute of Peace at Rocky Mountain College to start the Festival of Cultures in Billings, which offers residents an opportunity to both celebrate their heritage and learn about the heritage of others.

Svee, a fiction adviser to the Saturday Evening Post, credited his writing ability to being raised in a family of storytellers, and to his mentor and teacher at the University of Montana, Dorothy M. Johnson. Svee also teaches writing at Montana State University.

Svee's novel Sanctuary won the 1990 Spur Award given annually by the Western Writers of America for the best Western novel award. Svee was also the co-author of Script-ease, a guide to writing fiction.

Svee died on July 14, 2019, at the age of 75.

== Bibliography ==
- Spirit Wolf (1987)
- Incident at Pishkin Creek (1989)
- Sanctuary (1990)
- Single Tree (1994)
- The Peacemaker's Vengeance (2003)
- Showdown at Buffalo Jump (also published as Incident at Pishkin Creek) (2003)
- Outcast (2005)
