= Douglas C. Jones =

American novelist

Douglas Clyde Jones (December 6, 1924 – August 30, 1998) was an American author of historical fiction, including alternative history fiction. As a boy, he had lived for a time in Fort Smith, Arkansas, adjacent to former Indian territory.

Douglas Jones was born in Winslow, Arkansas. Following the divorce of his parents, he graduated from the Fayetteville, Arkansas high school in 1942 and was drafted into the army, where he served in the Pacific Theater. Following his discharge, Jones attended the University of Arkansas and obtained a bachelor's degree in journalism in 1949. He subsequently returned to the army and served for another twenty years. In service, he obtained a master's degree from the University of Wisconsin. After retiring as a Lt. Colonel in 1968 after twenty-five years of service, Jones taught journalism at Wisconsin for six years.

Jones wrote his first novel, The Court-Martial of George Armstrong Custer, which was soon turned into a television drama, based on the premise that Custer had survived the Battle of the Little Big Horn.

In addition to his writings, Jones was also a painter in the western genre and a jazz musician.

Douglas Jones died in Fayetteville of obstructive pulmonary disease.

In an effort to keep his work alive, in November 2010, New American Library reissued Jones's Civil War novel Elkhorn Tavern in trade paperback. It is the first of four planned reissues of his novels.

== Books by Douglas Jones ==
- The Treaty of Medicine Lodge [non fiction] (1966)
- The Court-Martial of George Armstrong Custer (1976)
- Arrest Sitting Bull (1977)
- A Creek Called Wounded Knee (1978)
- Winding Stair (1979)
- Elkhorn Tavern (1980)
- Weedy Rough [stories] (1981)
- The Barefoot Brigade (1982)
- Season of Yellow Leaf (1983)
- Gone the Dreams and Dancing (1984)
- Roman (1986)
- Hickory Cured (1987)
- Remember Santiago (1988)
- Come Winter (1989)
- The Search for Temperance Moon (1991)
- This Savage Race (1993)
- Shadow of the Moon (1995)
- A Spider for Loco Shoat (1997)
- Sometimes There Were Heroes (2005)
