= Spur Award =

Literary prizes given annually by the Western Writers of America

Spur Awards are literary prizes given annually by the Western Writers of America (WWA). The purpose of the Spur Awards is to honor writers for distinguished writing about the American West. The Spur Awards began in 1953, the same year the WWA was founded. An author need not be a member of the WWA to receive a Spur Award. Among previous Spur Award winners are Larry McMurtry for Lonesome Dove, Michael Blake for Dances with Wolves, Glendon Swarthout for The Shootist, and Tony Hillerman for Skinwalkers.

The Owen Wister Award for lifetime achievement in Western literature, first awarded in 1961, is also a Western Writers of America award, distinct from the Spur Awards.

Initially, there were five Spur Awards categories: western novel, historical novel, juvenile, short story, and reviewer. The categories have expanded and changed (or been renamed) over the years. There is no guarantee an award will be made in each category every year. The 2015 Spur Awards have the following categories:

- Spur Award for Best Western Novel
- Spur Award for Best Novel of the West
- Spur Award for Best Western Contemporary Novel
- Spur Award for Best Western Historical Novel
- Spur Award for Best Western Traditional Novel
- Spur Award for Best Western Juvenile Fiction
- Spur Award for Best First Novel
- Spur Award for Best Western Historical Nonfiction
- Spur Award for Best Western Contemporary Nonfiction
- Spur Award for Best Western Biography
- Spur Award for Best Western Juvenile Nonfiction
- Spur Award for Best First Nonfiction Book
- Spur Award for Best Western Storyteller (Illustrated Children's Book)
- Spur Award for Best Western Short Fiction
- Spur Award for Best Western Short Nonfiction
- Spur Award for Best Western Poem
- Spur Award for Best Western Song
- Spur Award for Best Western Drama Script
- Spur Award for Best Western Documentary Script
