= Western Writers of America =

American writers organization

WWA logo

Western Writers of America (WWA), founded 1953, promotes literature, both fictional and nonfictional, pertaining to the American West. Although its founders wrote traditional Western fiction, the more than 600 current members also include historians and other nonfiction writers, as well as authors from other genres.

WWA was founded by six authors, including D. B. Newton. It publishes the magazine Roundup.

== Awards ==
The WWA presents the Spur Awards annually for distinguished writing in several categories, and an annual Owen Wister Award for lifelong contributions to the field of Western literature.
