= Western fiction literature =

Literary genre

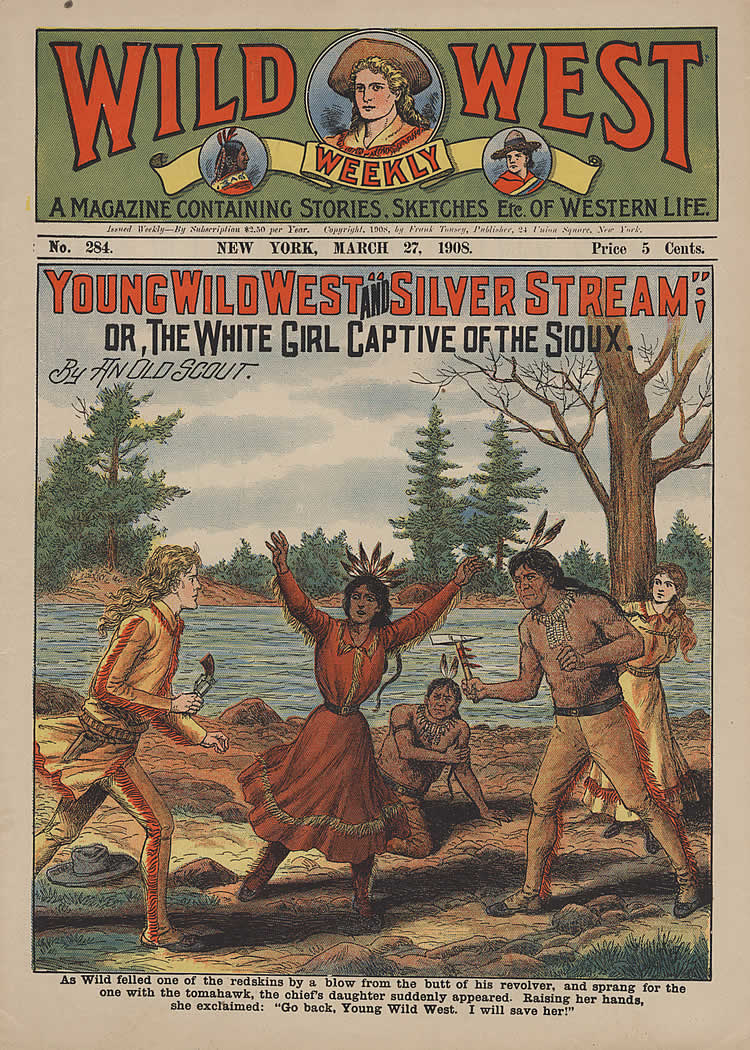
Cover of Wild West (1908) magazine no. 284

Western fiction is a genre of literature set in the American Old West frontier and typically set from the late eighteenth to the late nineteenth century. Well-known writers of Western fiction include Zane Grey from the early 20th century and Louis L'Amour from the mid-20th century. The genre peaked around the early 1960s, largely due to the popularity of televised Westerns such as Bonanza. Readership began to drop off in the mid- to late 1970s and reached a new low in the 2000s. Most bookstores, outside a few west American states, only carry a small number of Western fiction books.

== History ==
=== Pre-1850s ===
The predecessor of the Western in American literature emerged early with tales of the frontier. The most famous of the early 19th-century frontier novels were James Fenimore Cooper's five novels comprising the Leatherstocking Tales. Cooper's novels were largely set in what was at the time the American frontier: the Appalachian Mountains and areas west of there. As did his novel The Prairie (1824), most later Westerns would typically take place west of the Mississippi River.

The notable writer Washington Irving was inspired by Cooper and wrote tales of the American frontier beginning with A Tour on the Prairies which related his recent travels on the frontier. In 1834, he was approached by fur magnate John Jacob Astor, who convinced him to write a history of his fur trading colony in Astoria, Oregon. Irving made quick work of Astor's project, shipping the fawning biographical account Astoria in February 1836.

=== 1850s–1900 ===
The Western as a specialized genre got its start in the "penny dreadfuls" and later the "dime novels". Published in June 1860, Malaeska; the Indian Wife of the White Hunter is considered the first dime novel. These cheaply made books were hugely successful and capitalized on the many stories that were being told about the mountain men, outlaws, settlers, and lawmen who were taming the western frontier. Many of these novels were fictionalized stories based on actual people, such as Billy the Kid, Buffalo Bill, Wyatt Earp (who was still alive at the time), Wild Bill Hickok, and Jesse James.

=== 1900s–1930s ===
By 1900, the new medium of pulp magazines helped to relate these adventures to easterners. Meanwhile, non-American authors, like the German Karl May, picked up the genre, went to full novel length, and made it hugely popular and successful in continental Europe from about 1880 on, though they were generally dismissed as trivial by the literary critics of the day. One of the most famous pulp works of the era was Johnston McCulley's first Zorro novel, The Curse of Capistrano (1919).

Popularity grew with the publication of Owen Wister's novel The Virginian (1902) and especially Zane Grey's Riders of the Purple Sage (1912). The first Hopalong Cassidy stories by Clarence Mulford appeared in 1904, both as dime novels and in pulp magazines. When pulp magazines exploded in popularity in the 1920s, Western fiction greatly benefited (as did the author Max Brand, who excelled at the Western short story). Pulp magazines that specialised in Westerns include Cowboy Stories, Ranch Romances, Star Western, West, and Western Story Magazine. The simultaneous popularity of Western movies in the 1920s also helped the genre.

=== 1940s–1960s ===
In the 1940s several seminal Westerns were published, including The Ox-Bow Incident (1940) by Walter van Tilburg Clark, The Big Sky (1947) and The Way West (1949) by A.B. Guthrie Jr., and Shane (1949) by Jack Schaefer. Many other Western authors gained readership in the 1950s, such as Ray Hogan, Louis L'Amour, and Luke Short.

The genre peaked around the early 1960s, largely due to the tremendous number of Westerns on television. The burnout of the American public on television Westerns in the late 1960s seemed to have an effect on the literature as well, and interest in Western literature began to wane. In 1968 Charles Portis published True Grit, which became the most successful work of the era.

==== Western comics ====
Western novels, films and pulps gave birth to Western comics, which were very popular, particularly from the late 1940s until c. 1967, when the comics began to turn to reprints. This can particularly be seen at Marvel Comics, where Westerns began c. 1948 and thrived until 1967, when one of their flagship titles, Kid Colt Outlaw (1949–1979), ceased to have new stories and entered the reprint phase. Other notable long-running Marvel Western comics included Rawhide Kid (1955–1957, 1960–1979) Two-Gun Kid (1948–1962), and Marvel Wild Western (1948–1957).

DC Comics published the long-running series All-Star Western (1951–1961) and Western Comics (1948–1961), and Charlton Comics published Billy the Kid (1957–1983) and Cheyenne Kid (1957–1973). Magazine Enterprises' Straight Arrow ran from 1950 to 1956, and Prize Comics' Prize Comics Western ran from 1948 to 1956.

Fawcett Comics published a number of Western titles, including Hopalong Cassidy from 1948 to 1953. They also published comics starring actors known for their Western roles, including Tom Mix Western (1948–1953) and Gabby Hayes Western (1948–1953). Similarly, Dell Comics published Roy Rogers comics from 1948 to 1961, and Magazine Enterprises published Charles Starrett as the Durango Kid from 1949 to 1955.

The Franco-Belgian comic-series Lucky Luke by Morris (cartoonist) and René Goscinny is one of the most famous and estimated Western-comics in Europe.

The popular Western comic strip Red Ryder was syndicated in hundreds of American newspapers from 1938 to 1964.

=== 1970s and 1980s ===
In the 1970s, the work of Louis L'Amour began to catch hold of most Western readers and he has dominated the Western reader lists ever since. George G. Gilman also maintained a cult following for several years in the 1970s and 1980s. Larry McMurtry's and Cormac McCarthy's works remain notable. Specifically, McMurtry's Lonesome Dove and McCarthy's Blood Meridian (both published in 1985) are recognized as major masterpieces both within and beyond the genre. Elmer Kelton, mostly noted for his novels The Good Old Boys and The Time it Never Rained, was voted by the Western Writers of America as the "Best Western Writer of All Time". Early in the 1970s Indiana novelist Marilyn Durham wrote two popular Western novels, The Man Who Loved Cat Dancing and Dutch Uncle.

Western readership as a whole began to drop off in the mid- to late 1970s. A partial exception was an innovation, the so-called adult Western. As Robert J. Randisi puts it, "it's a western novel with sex in it. That's right, the cowboy has sex with women. A new idea? Probably not, but heretofore this had not been seen in western novels (certainly not by Max Brand, Zane Grey, Owen Wister or Louis L'Amour). What these books actually showed was that men and women really did have sex in the old west. (Back when I started the series a rigidly traditional western writer of my acquaintance insisted to me that "women did not have orgasms in the old west.")."

=== 1990s and 2000s ===
Readership of Western fiction reached a new low in the first decade of the twenty-first century, and most bookstores, outside a few western states, only carry a small number of Western fiction books. Nevertheless, several Western fiction series are published monthly, such as The Trailsman, Slocum, Longarm and The Gunsmith; these are all adult Westerns. Canadian author Guy Vanderhaeghe wrote a trilogy of Western novels: The Englishman's Boy, The Last Crossing, and A Good Man. Other more recent Western authors include Ivan Doig and William Kittredge. The genre has seen the rumblings of a revival, and 2008 saw the publication of an all-Western short story magazine Great Western Fiction which was published by Dry River Publishing in Colorado. Nevertheless, the magazine was short-lived and folded after only two issues. One of the most successful Western novels in recent times was The Sisters Brothers (2011) by Patrick deWitt.

== Organizations ==
Western authors are represented by the Western Writers of America, who present the annual Spur Awards and Owen Wister Award for Lifetime Achievement. The organization was founded in 1953 to promote the literature of the American West. While the founding members were mostly Western fiction writers, the organization began getting a number of other members from other backgrounds such as historians, regional history buffs, and writers from other genres.

Western Fictioneers, founded in 2010, is a professional writers' group that encourages and promotes the traditional Westerns. It is the only professional writers' organization composed entirely of authors who have written Western fiction. Fans of the genre may join as patron members. The Western Fictioneers' annual Peacemakers competition awards prizes in many categories of Western writing.

== See also ==
- List of Western fiction authors
- Western (genre)

== Bibliography ==
- Boatright, Mody C. "The Formula in Cowboy Fiction and Drama." Western Folklore (1969): 136–145. in JSTOR
- Davis, David B. "Ten-Gallon Hero." American Quarterly (1954) 6#2 pp: 111–125. in JSTOR
- Durham, Philip. "The Cowboy and the Myth Makers." The Journal of Popular Culture (1967) 1#1 pp: 58–62.
- Estleman, Loren D. The Wister trace: classic novels of the American frontier (Jameson Books, 1987)
- Fleming, Robert E (October 1979). The Dime Novel Western. Rocky Mountain Modern Language Association.
- Hamilton, Cynthia S. Western and hard-boiled detective fiction in America: from high noon to midnight (Macmillan, 1987)
- Jones, Daryl (c. 1978). The dime novel western. Bowling Green, Ohio: Popular Press, Bowling Green State University. ISBN 0879720980.
- Jones, Daryl Emrys (January 1974). The Dime Novel Western: The Evolution of a Popular Formula. Michigan State University.
- McVeigh, Stephen. The American Western (Edinburgh University Press, 2007.)
- Marsden, Michael T. "The Popular Western Novel as a Cultural Artifact." Arizona and the West (1978): 203–214. in JSTOR
- Stauffer, Helen Winter, and Susan J. Rosowski, eds. Women and Western American literature (Whitston Publishing Company, 1982)
- Witschi, Nicolas S. ed. A Companion to the Literature and Culture of the American West. (2011) excerpt
