= Jon Sharpe =

American author (1920–2004)

Jon Sharpe (April 29, 1920 - November 3, 2004) was the original author of The Trailsman series of Western novels. The century series, which has run since the early 1980s, was created by author Jon Messmann, who wrote most of the first 200 books in the series under the Jon Sharpe pseudonym until his retirement in the late 1990s (Messmann died in 2004).

The Trailsman series still uses Jon Sharpe as a house name covering various ghostwriters (among them David Robbins, Robert J Randisi, J. B. Keller, Bill Crider, Ed Gorman, Will C. Knott, Robert Vardeman, John Edward Ames, and James Reasoner) under contract with the publisher. These books are best described as "adult" Westerns with lots of action.

Another series created by Messmann, Canyon O'Grady, was also attributed to Sharpe.
