= The Man Who Loved Cat Dancing (film) =

1973 film

- Theatrical release poster
- Directed by: Richard C. Sarafian
- Screenplay by: Eleanor Perry; William W. Norton (uncredited)
- Based on: The Man Who Loved Cat Dancing; 1972 novel by Marilyn Durham
- Produced by: Eleanor Perry; Martin Poll
- Starring: Burt Reynolds; Sarah Miles; Lee J. Cobb; Jack Warden; George Hamilton
- Cinematography: Harry Stradling Jr.
- Edited by: Tom Rolf
- Music by: John Williams
- Distributed by: Metro-Goldwyn-Mayer
- Release date: June 28, 1973 (USA)
- Running time: 114 min.
- Country: United States
- Language: English
- Budget: $3 million
- Box office: $3,600,000 (US/ Canada rentals)

The Man Who Loved Cat Dancing is a 1973 American Western film adaptation of Marilyn Durham's novel of the same name directed by Richard C. Sarafian, written by Eleanor Perry and William W. Norton, and starring Burt Reynolds and Sarah Miles.

== Plot ==
The film opens with a wealthy woman named Catherine stumbling across the preparation for a train robbery. As the chaotic heist unfolds, two of the thieves, Dawes and Billy, abduct Catherine. The crew is led by Jay Grobart.

Lapchance, a veteran railroad detective with a posse, is on their trail. Accompanying the posse is Catherine's husband Willard Crocker, an arrogant millionaire, who is obsessed with retrieving his wife, though he knows that she does not love him.

Grobart is protective of Catherine. She soon learns he was married to Native American woman Cat Dancing. After Cat was raped and murdered, a distraught Grobart kills the man responsible for the crime. Dawes beats Billy, causing internal injuries that should soon kill him. Grobart leaves the others at an old cabin for a day. A few marauding Indians attack the cabin, killing Billy and Charlie, while Dawes runs off with some of the money. Grobart returns and kills the marauders in an intense battle.

As Grobart and Catherine get to know each other, they find themselves falling in love, and despite his criminal past, she admires him for avenging the death of the woman he loved. Catherine and he continue their journey. Catherine admits her feelings for Grobart, and they make love. Dawes finds them, rapes Catherine, and plans to kill Grobart for the remaining money, but is killed by Grobart.

Grobart and Catherine travel to the Shoshone village where Grobart lived with Cat Dancing and their children — their very young daughter and their young son, Dream Speaker — who now live with Cat Dancing's brother, Iron Knife. He discovers that his children have bonded with the Shoshone and wish to remain in the village. Grobart is also revealed to have pushed his son aside and strangled Cat Dancing, thinking that she had chosen to sleep with the man who, in fact, had raped her. Grobart leaves Catherine and the railroad money at the village and departs, not wanting to place her in further danger.

The posse arrives at the village and retrieves the money. Crocker insists on pursuing Grobart to kill him. The posse spends the night at the village. That evening, Catherine and Dream Speaker leave to find Grobart, with Dream Speaker guiding her to a cave in the hills where Grobart is camped out. Grobart bids his son farewell and reunites with Catherine.

The following morning, as they prepare to leave, Crocker arrives and shoots Grobart from the tree line. Grobart is wounded and Catherine rushes to his aid. Catherine grabs Grobart's pistol from his holster and shoots Crocker dead as he charges them. Lapchance orders his men to put Crocker's body on a pack horse, and having already retrieved the railroad's money, leaves Crocker's horse for Grobart. Grobart pulls himself to his feet and embraces Catherine.

== Cast ==
- Burt Reynolds as Jay Grobart
- Sarah Miles as Catherine Crocker
- Lee J. Cobb as Harvey Lapchance
- Jack Warden as Dawes
- George Hamilton as Willard Crocker
- Bo Hopkins as Billy Bowen
- Robert Donner as Dub
- Nancy Malone as Sudie
- Jay Silverheels as Chief
- Jay Varela as Charlie Bent
- James Hampton as Jimmy

== Original novel ==
The film was based on the debut novel by Marilyn Durham. She was an Evansville housewife, who had never attended a writing class before and knew little about the West, although she had studied at the University of Evansville for a year and was a lifelong reader and lover of movies, particularly spaghetti Westerns. In January 1970, she sat down and started writing, wanting to pay off the 25-year-old mortgage on her 64-year-old widowed mother's home, wanting to write "a big juicy, dirty best seller". She was particularly inspired by the works of Geoffrey Household.

She based Jay on Lee Van Cleef, Catherine on Julie Adams, and Willard on Carroll O'Connor, and admits she wrote it as a movie, inspired by her movie watching. She sent the book off to agents and it was accepted by Harcourt Brace Jovanovich. Even before the novel had been published, movie rights, foreign rights, and paperback rights were sold. The New York Times called the book "beautifully executed". It became a best seller.

== Production ==
=== Development ===
Film rights were sold, before the novel had been published, for $50,000. Eleanor Perry had read the novel in galleys and loved it. She took the novel to producer Martin Poll, who bought it and they agreed to produce together with Perry writing the script.

Perry had recently split from her husband Frank, personally and professionally. In early 1972, she said the film would contain "very little of the murderous violence we've seen in Westerns lately." Perry described the film as "the first woman's-lib Western."

Perry admitted the novel was "female fantasizing. But what else was Wuthering Heights?"

Poll produced the film at Metro-Goldwyn-Mayer, where Dan Melnick was head of production. The movie was MGM's biggest-budgeted film of the year. Melnick tried to get Steve McQueen and Ali MacGraw to play the leads, but was unsuccessful. Perry said the film "cried out for Hepburn and Bogart, but we settled on Burt Reynolds."

Burt Reynolds was signed in November 1972. Reynolds said he did the movie "because I loved the book. I'd never done a love story, either."

The filmmakers wanted Jane Fonda for the female lead and Candice Bergen was discussed. Anthony Harvey was pursued to direct. Carol Lynley said the female lead in the film was one of the two roles in Hollywood "every actress wants to do", the other being Daisy in The Great Gatsby.

In January 1973, Richard Sarafian signed to direct. The same month, Sarah Miles was cast in the female lead.

Perry says Poll sidelined her during pre-production and would continue to do so through production. "I never had one approval. I never knew what was happening." Poll claimed that his contract with Perry gave her no approvals, and that she was often not available for consultation during pre-production.

=== Shooting ===
It was filmed in Bryce Canyon National Park, Kanab, the St. George–Hurricane area, Zion, Virgin River and Silver Reef in Utah, as well as Gila Bend and Old Tucson, Arizona.

=== Death of David Whiting ===
While filming in Arizona, Sarah Miles' personal assistant, David Whiting, was found dead under mysterious circumstances in her hotel room at Gila Bend, on February 11.

The night before, the cast and crew had gone to the town of Ajo to celebrate Reynolds' birthday. When they returned to the hotel, Miles spent several hours in Reynolds' room until 3:00 am (later claiming she was using the services of a masseuse there). When she returned to her room, Whiting was there and asked where she had been. She told him, Whiting hit her, she screamed, and she was helped to escape by Miles' son's governess. Miles returned to Reynolds' room for the rest of the night. When she returned to her room the next morning at 11:00 am, she found Whiting dead. Investigators discovered a head injury on Whiting and some blood stains.

An inquest into the death was heard. MGM objected to Miles, Reynolds, and Miles' son's governess appearing on the grounds it would hold up production. A doctor gave evidence that the death was due to a drug overdose, and the head injury came from Whiting falling against a table. Filming of the unit shifted to Rio Rico, Arizona.

Whiting's mother was upset that Miles and Reynolds did not appear at the inquest, and accused them of a coverup. Reynolds and Miles eventually gave evidence at the inquest after being ordered to do so by a judge.

The inquest found that Whiting died of a drug overdose.

Miles and Whiting later were revealed to have been having an affair, and this, together with the resulting publicity, contributed to the disintegration of her marriage to Robert Bolt.

=== Rewriting ===
Perry did not go on set because Poll did not want her there. She says much of her script was rewritten by the actors, notably George Hamilton, and several writers, notably William Norton, Robert Bolt, Tracy Keenan Wynn, Steve Shagan, and Brian Hutton. Poll denied Bolt, Wynn, Shagan, Hamilton, or Hutton rewrote the script. He says Sarafin, MGM, and he were dissatisfied with the script and hired William Norton to work on it prior to shooting. He says she was offered the chance to collaborate with Norton, but Perry declined. "It was fairly easy to batter me since Westerns are traditionally the turf of jocks", said Perry.

In particular, she fought with Poll and Sarafin over a rape scene. The lead female was raped in the novel, but Perry removed it from the screenplay. "She was independent, a sort of 1880s liberated woman", said Perry. "I thought she would defend herself, that she would not be raped. But the director and my co-producer thought otherwise... One of them told me, 'rape turns some men on'." Perry lost the fight. She says although she was co-producer, she had no actual authority. "From now on, I only want to work with people I respect and like", she said. "Life's too short."

Poll claimed the rape was necessary to motivate the action and denied he was a chauvinist. "I love women", he added. "I am a heterosexual man who loves women. And I have probably had more women work for me than anyone else." Norton tried to claim credit for the script, but the Writers Guild of America awarded sole credit to Perry.

== Release ==
=== Critical reception ===
Reynolds said of the film "it's not as good as the book."

Roger Greenspun of The New York Times did not care for the film:

The film's poetry is as numbing as its violence. The Man Who Loved Cat Dancing is, indeed, a kind of festival of incompetence. Each shot is held slightly too long or too short, and is somehow off-center. Each performance is uncertain, like something seen in an early rehearsal. Even the Indians look fake, including good old Jay Silverheels, who is real. The screenplay, based on Marilyn Durham's novel, is by Eleanor Perry (David and Lisa, Diary of a Mad Housewife), who can do much, much better.

In contrast, Charles Champlin of the Los Angeles Times liked the movie. In his review for the John Williams Web Page, he noted the complications in making the picture. He concluded his review: "In spite of the difficulties faced by the actors and filmmakers, The Man Who Loved Cat Dancing boasts gorgeous widescreen location photography, an interesting feminist spin on traditional western formulas — with Miles' strong-willed Catherine Crocker an engaging screen presence throughout — and strong support from virtually the entire cast; in particular, the film proved once and for all that Burt Reynolds was capable of handling a straight dramatic role as well as a lightweight comic one."

"There's nothing to talk about in Cat Dancing except that it brings me pain", said Reynolds later. "So I'd rather not talk about it."

== See also ==
- List of American films of 1973
