= Dutch Uncle =

Dutch Uncle may refer to:

- Dutch Uncle (novel) by Marilyn Durham
- Dutch Uncle (play) by Simon Gray
- Dutch Uncles, a British indie pop band
