= David Whiting =

American film producer (1946–1973)

- Born: August 25 or 26, 1946; New York City, U.S.
- Died: February 11, 1973 (aged 26); Gila Bend, Arizona, U.S.
- Cause of death: Accidental overdose of methaqualone
- Other name: Anthony Blaine
- Education: Georgetown University; Haverford College
- Occupations: Writer, personal manager, producer
- Years active: 1970–1973
- Known for: Circumstances of his death related to filming of The Man Who Loved Cat Dancing
- Notable work: Lady Caroline Lamb

David Andrew Whiting (August 1946 – February 11, 1973) was an American writer and personal manager who died in unusual circumstances. After becoming the youngest correspondent hired by Time, he turned to working in the film industry, where he enjoyed close friendships with actresses Candice Bergen and particularly Sarah Miles. After a brief affair with the latter, he became her personal manager.

A child of a broken marriage, he was educated at the exclusive St. Albans School in Washington, D.C., where his mother lived. He made an impression on fellow students there, and some faculty, with his intelligence and persona. Due to academic difficulties, he left the school after his junior year for Georgetown, where he also fell short academically. After a year working on a documentary film shoot in Libya, which cemented his interest in that field, he returned to the U.S. to finish his undergraduate studies at Haverford College.

Following his 1968 graduation, he began his journalistic career, notably managing to sneak into a White House ball he was covering for Time and briefly dance with Patricia Nixon before the Secret Service caught him. He began gravitating toward film at the expense of his journalistic career, and was able to help Miles and her husband, playwright and screenwriter Robert Bolt, get Lady Caroline Lamb, Bolt's only directorial effort, produced in 1971. Whiting was unsuccessful in getting his own screenplays produced.

Miles recalls Whiting as psychologically unstable, overly protective of her, sometimes to the point of abuse, and threatening suicide on several occasions. Following an incident during production of The Man Who Loved Cat Dancing in 1973, Whiting was found dead, with a significant head injury and high concentrations of two tranquilizers in his bloodstream, in Miles's hotel room after fighting with her and co-star Burt Reynolds in the early morning. Extensive media coverage speculated that Reynolds had played some role in Whiting's death; MGM's lawyers allowed local authorities only limited access to Reynolds, Miles and her nanny, who had slept the night in the room adjoining Miles's. Almost two months later a coroner's jury found Whiting's death to be the result of an accidental overdose, but qualified that conclusion as based on limited evidence and demanding of further investigation. Private investigators and experts hired by Whiting's mother came to different conclusions.

== Early life and education ==
David Andrew Whiting was born to Robert, an urban planner, and Louise Whiting in New York City on August 25/26, 1946. The couple divorced when David was three years old; Robert began a new family in Chicago and became estranged from Louise and David, though he did send child support payments he could scarcely afford. Louise also remarried, to Francis Newell Campbell, becoming Louise Campbell. They lived in a small house in the north of Washington, D.C., described by Whiting's friends as a depressing environment. Louise was eccentric and emotionally distant, and enrolled her son at various boarding schools from the age of 10. Whiting resented her, finding her uncaring, and only called her "Mater". She said after his death that she had not been able to remember his exact birthday, even when he was a child.

When he left his boarding school in Lake Placid, New York, he claimed to have given the headmaster a box of excrement as a farewell gift. He then attended high school at the St. Albans School back in Washington. Journalist Mary Anne Dolan, who knew Whiting then, said that he aspired to live as a combination of Fred Astaire, Cary Grant, Frank Sinatra and Cole Porter. He also had a fascination with F. Scott Fitzgerald and particularly The Great Gatsby. According to high school friend and biographer Jonathan Agronsky, Whiting's classmates were unconcerned with his mental state, though they would often spend time trying to decide if his "Chaucerian tales" were true.

Despite claiming past athletic prowess, Whiting was overweight and nicknamed "Gumpy" at St. Albans, though he did play on the junior varsity football team there as a reserve lineman. Whiting was the smartest in his class across subjects, often challenging his teachers; an English master said that while Whiting could be irritating, he was so intelligent "he could do anything he wanted." The administration of the school, wanting Whiting to improve his grades, placed him on academic probation as a sophomore. As a junior he got a near-perfect SAT score, but in the same semester he got a C+, falling below the B-average required, and was expelled. He continued to be mentored by St. Albans' assistant headmaster John C. Davis, whom he saw as a father figure, for several years.

During those years, Whiting took dance classes at a high-society school, where he met Eleanor Lanahan, daughter of Frances Scott Fitzgerald. They were acquainted from cotillion and debutante balls, where Whiting would be a dance partner for young women, and in November 1963, Lanahan wrote to ask him to accompany her to a holiday ball.

Whiting skipped his senior year and enrolled at Georgetown University that fall, but underperformed academically in his freshman year and had to leave. He then found a job as a script writer for documentary company Trans Africa Films, and left to work in the Libyan Sahara, becoming fitter and slimmer. He described the trip as the "greatest experience of [his] life." Fearing that he would not have any future prospects upon his return without his high school diploma, he wrote Davis from the Sahara to seek his assistance in applying to college again, saying: "I am not merely asking, I am begging – will you help me? It may be the last time anyone can."

He became an English major in the Haverford College class of 1968, enrolling as a sophomore with Davis' help. He was popular among women, particularly at nearby Bryn Mawr College while there, though an ex-girlfriend of the time described him as not overly handsome and suggested the other women, like her, were intrigued by his eccentric nature and film connections, describing him as "a person in a lot of psychic pain." While at Haverford, Whiting went to visit a friend at Princeton University and posed as a student there to impress Lanahan. He wrote a thesis on either F. Scott Fitzgerald or Hamlet, according to his mother.

== Career ==
While at college, Whiting wrote for the Washington Star-News, covering affairs in D.C., including the debutante balls. In 1968, straight out of Haverford, Whiting was hired by Time, becoming the magazine's youngest ever correspondent. On an early assignment he was sent to cover a White House ball thrown by Tricia Nixon (daughter of then-president Richard Nixon), due to his experience; though security was tight, Whiting left the press room to attend the ball, and was later apprehended by the Secret Service while dancing with Tricia Nixon herself. In 1970 he was assigned to cover Los Angeles, where editor Henry Grunwald called Whiting his "Golden Boy". Whiting interviewed many film stars, befriending some; Candice Bergen nicknamed him "Preppy". He wrote an in-depth article about her for Time, under the pseudonym Anthony Blaine (after Fitzgerald protagonists Anthony Patch of The Beautiful and Damned and Amory Blaine of This Side of Paradise). Whiting had met Bergen while at the Cannes Film Festival in 1970, though he was not officially covering it; he tried to woo her and followed her to Spain, where she was filming, and then around Beverly Hills when she returned. She described him as "a good friend". He also wrote a story about Paula Prentiss and her marriage to Richard Benjamin for Cosmopolitan in 1971. Despite this early success, the exposure to Hollywood encouraged Whiting to leave journalism for film production. Lanahan said that Whiting had set his sights on that career as soon as he worked on a set in Libya, and had always been obsessed with movies and movie stars.

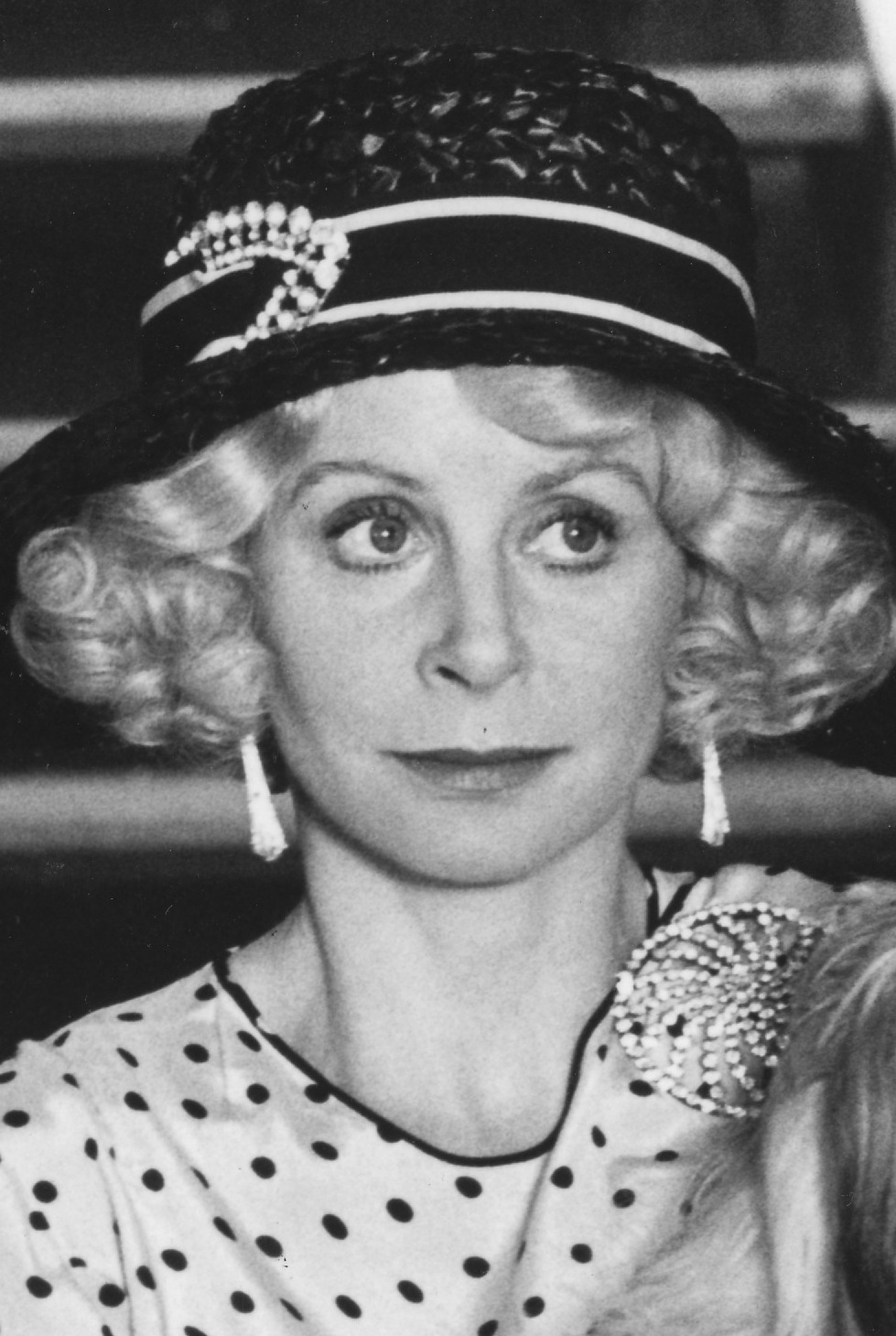
Sarah Miles in 1980

In 1971, Whiting interviewed English actress Sarah Miles for Time; the story was ultimately published by Cosmopolitan. He pursued Miles, who was married to screenwriter Robert Bolt: the day after the interview, Whiting requested another meeting; a few days later, as Miles was due to fly to New York for other interviews, Whiting approached her in Los Angeles International Airport. He told her he was booked on the same flight, and arranged to sit next to her on the plane; in New York, Whiting appeared at her hotel with a room on the same floor. Though he behaved strangely, Miles said she did not "tell him to get lost", though she denied encouraging his advances. At the hotel in New York, Whiting was in the room when Miles became angry at MGM staff who could not secure her a work permit to appear on talk shows after 10 days of trying; Whiting intervened and got her one in a half hour. She allowed him to accompany her during her stay in New York. He then followed her back to England.

Whiting developed an obsession with Miles, who nicknamed him "Whiz Kid", and neglected his journalism work. He was fired from Time; Miles soon hired him as her manager. He had proposed writing a story about Miles and Bolt's marriage, but did not work on it. While Whiting was living with Miles and Bolt, in 1971, he took on their film project, Lady Caroline Lamb; Bolt had written the screenplay for Miles to star and himself to direct, but was struggling to get it produced. Whiting called all of his film contacts, as well as other companies he could ask for financial backing, and took Miles to the Cannes Film Festival to network. He told Miles and Bolt that he had quit Time to work on the film, so the couple hired him as "Director of Publicity and Exploitation" for their film company, Pulsar Productions. Feeling underutilized, Whiting secretly made a deal to produce a documentary about the production of Lady Caroline Lamb, which angered the producers of the film. He stayed in his room dealing with anxiety and not doing his work. He was fired from Pulsar but Miles kept him on as her manager. In 1972, Whiting got Miles the coveted lead role opposite Burt Reynolds in The Man Who Loved Cat Dancing. While this film was in production, Whiting was working on a screenplay (his first), The Capri Numbers, with a British friend.

== Death ==
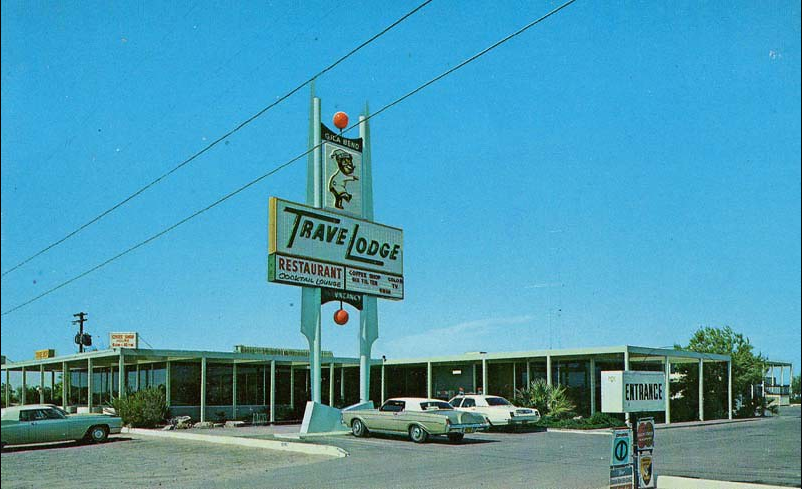
The Travelodge in Gila Bend, photographed in 1971

Whiting was found dead in Miles' motel room at the Travelodge in Gila Bend, Arizona, on February 11, 1973, aged 26. Agronsky noted that Whiting was one of three St. Albans classmates to die tragically young, each in ways Agronsky said "seemed to reflect the struggles our (Baby Boom) generation had faced while coming of age".

=== Background ===
Around 40 cast and crew of The Man Who Loved Cat Dancing had arrived in Gila Bend on January 29, a few weeks prior to Whiting's death, to use the old railroad station as a location. The screening of Lady Caroline Lamb for the Directors Guild, in Los Angeles, took place on the evening of February 11. Miles told journalists that Whiting's mental health had seemingly improved before shooting began, but that once they were in the U.S. he became extremely possessive of her again, wanting to control whom she spent time with. He annoyed people on the set, and though Miles invited him out to dinner and dance initially, he would turn down her offers. Whiting had originally been staying in the motel room adjoining Miles', but moved to one in a nearby building when Miles' son, Thomas, and a British nanny, Jane Evans, arrived on February 2 to stay in the connecting room. Whiting had recommended Evans to Miles as a nanny, having mutual friends in London, and may have dated her. Miles also testified that she often spent time drinking with wranglers at the motel's cocktail lounge, which worried Whiting.

On February 6, a fight occurred in Miles' motel room, where Whiting reportedly physically attacked both Miles and Evans after Miles asked him about the woman Evans told her had recently broken up with him; Miles said that he became angry because she was not upset he had been seeing other women. The next day, producer Martin Poll hinted to Whiting that his presence on set was unwelcome. On February 8, Whiting entered Miles' room for the last time before the night he died; Miles said "his face was ashen and white, and more sallow than [she had] ever seen it." He had brought a copy of the screenplay he was working on and told Miles that it was bad, expressing that he "can't write anything." After this, Whiting did not leave his motel room, and hung the "do not disturb" sign on the door to keep out staff. That night, he spent over an hour on the phone with an ex-fiancée, still a friend, in Washington; she said that he said he wanted to leave Gila Bend, suggesting he might fly to Washington to talk with her, and that he sounded sad but not suicidal. Shortly before midnight on February 10, Whiting received a call from a friend in Beverly Hills asking if he was going to attend the Lady Caroline Lamb premiere. He said he would not but told the friend he planned to be in Hollywood the following week. When the friend commented that Whiting sounded drunk, Whiting said that he had taken Mandrax.

==== Conflict with Miles and Reynolds ====
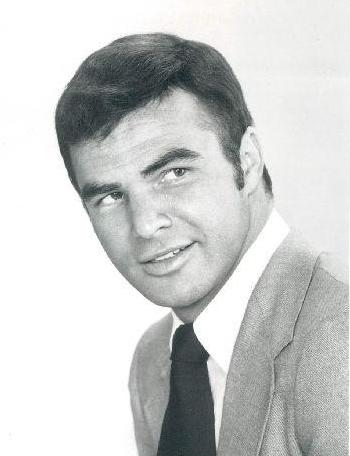
Burt Reynolds in 1970

About a dozen cast and crew had driven out to the Pink Palomino café in Ajo, for Reynolds' birthday and to welcome Merv Griffin to the set, on the evening of February 10; Miles had called Whiting to invite him but he declined. She rode with Reynolds on the way out but returned early with Lee J. Cobb to ride in his new car. After spending some time at the motel's cocktail lounge, she decided to apologize to Reynolds for leaving without him, going to his room at almost midnight. A masseuse, Letsgo Roberts, hired initially to tend to Miles on the production, arrived in Reynolds' room to give him a massage, at about the same time as Miles. Roberts believed the pair had been drinking but were not drunk at the time. She left around 2 a.m., offering to walk Miles back to her room, but Reynolds turned down the offer. Reynolds and Miles talked and spent time in the room until around 3 a.m. When Miles left his room, Reynolds walked her to her door. Miles then said that "as soon as she stepped into [her] room [...] Whiting jumped out of the dressing room". He seemed to have entered while she was not present and waited for her return, demanding to know the details of her night. When she refused to talk to him, he hit her. In a later account, Miles described it as violent and said "it was the nastiest beating [she'd] ever had in [her] life". She screamed as a result, alerting Evans in the adjoining room. Evans tried to pull Whiting away from Miles, and Miles asked Evans to call Reynolds' room. As Evans went to call, Whiting left the room; when Reynolds received the call, he had just gone to bed. Reynolds—who said that, as he rounded the building after being called, he saw Whiting entering his (Whiting's) room—soon arrived and took Miles to his (Reynolds') room. Reynolds said he saw the drapes of Whiting's room open and then close as they walked back to Reynolds' room. He later testified that on that walk, he told Miles: "If I was not as mature as I am now, I would lay him out."

Miles stayed in Reynolds' room until some time between 8 a.m. and 11:15 a.m. (in different statements she gave different times). She testified that she had wanted to call or check on Whiting, worrying that he would be depressed after the fight, but Reynolds convinced her to wait until morning. Evans, still in the room next to Miles', said that around 20 minutes after Reynolds took Miles back to his room, she heard someone enter Miles' room and open drawers. When she called out Miles' name, there was no response, so she assumed it was Whiting. Still scared of him, she said nothing more and went to sleep.

=== Discovery of body ===
Evans woke up at 7:30 a.m. because she was cold; realizing the chill was coming from Miles' room, she went through the connecting door, found the outside door to Miles' room open, and closed it from the inside before returning to bed. The lights were still on in Miles' room, and the dressing room would have been visible when walking across it. Whiting's body was later found laying across the threshold of the bathroom and dressing room, but Evans said she saw no body and was drowsy at the time. When Miles left Reynolds' room in the morning, she visited Evans' room to speak with her briefly, then entered her own room either to use the bathroom or collect birth control pills and found Whiting's body. She returned to Evans and asked her to call Reynolds again. In Reynolds' testimony he said that, once on the scene, he noticed Whiting clutching a bottle of pills and removed it, taking them to Miles (who was by then calming down in another room across the motel) to ask what the bottle contained, saying she was too upset to answer. Reynolds said he could not remember if he left the bottle with Miles or took it back to her room, or something else. Miles said she did not initially know Whiting was dead, learning of this some time between discovering the body and speaking to the police sergeant first on scene.

Local police sergeant Forrest Hinderliter was called to the Travelodge on reports of Whiting's death at 12:06 p.m. The dispatcher told him that Whiting's death was an overdose. Hinderliter made an initial examination of the body at 12:30 p.m., noticing that the coolness and rigor mortis indicated Whiting had been dead for several hours already. Whiting was "curled up on his left side", laying across both the bathroom and dressing room of the motel room, and his arms "were wrapped in an embrace around an empty polyethylene wastebasket". Large red pills were around the body on the floor. As Hinderliter left the motel room, he was approached by an MGM official who stressed to him that Whiting died of an overdose and told him that Miles had found the body. The MGM official told Hinderliter that Miles would be too upset to talk, but she agreed to provide a statement.

The local coroner and justice of the peace, Mulford T. "Sonny" Winsor IV, was then called to the motel; he initially found it to be a clear suicide and formed a makeshift coroner's jury to record the verdict. When looking for identification on the body to confirm, all Winsor found was a key to Miles' room, and so he went to check Whiting's own room. When he entered, he found the room and bathroom covered in blood; a later inspection found another key in Whiting's room, for Jane Evans and Thomas Bolt's room (Whiting's initial room), which also had blood on it. Winsor called the police chief to the scene, who quickly called in the Arizona State Police. After Winsor's inspection, Hinderliter returned to Miles' room and noticed a pool of blood beginning to seep out from the back of Whiting's head; he re-examined the body and found a "star-shaped wound" on the head, which had started bleeding again when Winsor had rolled the body to look for identification.

On the afternoon of February 11, another party was held for Reynolds' birthday, a barbecue at the Elks Club in Gila Bend. Whiting's death was in the news by the evening of February 12, on Rona Barrett's talk show. Barrett learned of the news when she inquired as to Robert Bolt's unusual demeanor at the Lady Caroline Lamb screening.

=== Investigation ===
The police recorded the contents of Whiting's motel room, which did not include a suicide note. They found a large number of photographs of Miles; a neatly packed suitcase; a magazine lying on his bloodstained bed as if he had been reading while bleeding; two bottles of scotch, one nearly empty; a copy of the novel The Mistress, for which he had bought the film rights for Miles; Whiting's portable typewriter, but with ribbon and spools ripped out; and a copy of his screenplay of The Capri Numbers. Following the autopsy, Whiting's body was taken to the nearest funeral home, located in Buckeye, 40 mi (64 km) to the north; his next of kin was listed as Miles and it was difficult to find his mother. An MGM lawyer arrived in Gila Bend on February 12, the day after Whiting's death, and advised the cast and crew not to cooperate with the investigation without their own counsel present. That same day, production was set to move to Nogales, and cast and crew left the Travelodge to go there. On February 14, MGM hired Arizona lawyers on behalf of Miles, Reynolds, and Evans; the lawyers and detectives worked out a deal to have persons of interest (including unnamed other members of the cast and crew) record unsworn statements and responses in advance—the "Rio Rico tapes," so called because they were recorded at the Rio Rico Inn in Nogales, on February 22. MGM hoped the tapes would prevent anyone from being subpoenaed to testify. Miles' lawyer later suggested the detectives were particularly interested in Evans' story, as they had replayed her Rio Rico tape until it was worn. Reynolds was represented by John Flynn; MGM had initially hired Flynn for Miles, but through personal connections he swapped clients, and Miles was represented by Benjamin Lazarow. MGM's interests were represented by Harry Cananaugh.

Campbell, Whiting's mother, came to Gila Bend four days after his death, accusing Reynolds of his murder. Campbell was eccentric and told many conflicting stories about her own life when asked by reporters; some speculated she was not Whiting's mother due to the inconsistencies. She had been tracked down after police issued calls for information on Whiting's family. Campbell had not identified herself and was upset that the police had been able to find her. She told them not to contact Whiting's father, who she claimed had almost died himself of a heart attack three weeks earlier and was recovering, or his stepfather, who she said also suffered ill-health and was spending the winter in Hawaii. She behaved erratically, trying to steal Whiting's personal belongings from evidence, and taking her own pathologist to the funeral home to make sure his organs were still in his body. The wound on Whiting's head had been stitched up to prevent leakage, which Campbell complained about, but then stuck her finger into it.

The inquest was scheduled for February 27. Winsor broke the Rio Rico tapes deal and subpoenaed six people from the production to appear; MGM lawyers managed to serve Winsor with an order against subpoenaing Miles and Reynolds in the minutes before the inquest was held, and the inquest began without them. Hinderliter instead appeared as the first witness. Campbell had hired a local lawyer to challenge MGM's efforts. As the inquest began, Campbell first joined the press outside the courthouse and presented the reporters with a personal letter she said proved Whiting would not take his own life, and then entered the courthouse to stall proceedings until her lawyer could overturn the MGM injunction and force the actors to appear. Winsor continued despite her disruption, and the jury was about to recess to form their conclusion when a call came from the Arizona Superior Court informing Winsor that Campbell's lawyers had successfully filed for an order to prevent an inquest until it was determined whether Miles, Reynolds, and Evans should have to appear in person.

On March 7, a judge ruled that the three needed to testify, and the inquest resumed a week later with all parties present. The attorney outlining the events avoided some detail, making no mention of Miles spending time in Reynolds' room. Campbell complained that the actors were being given "preferential treatment", and always maintained that her only interest in the inquest was to "protect the name of [her] son," who she said was neither suicidal nor abusive to women. At the inquest, Miles was "alternately sobbing and indignant"; Winsor "was so unnerved [by Miles] that he had to start the oath twice." The New York Times reported that after beginning the oath incorrectly, Winsor told Miles: "You're so pretty, you shook me up." It also said that the actors were questioned by attorneys "gingerly". Miles described the courtroom as a scene from a B-movie, as it was over-packed with Hollywood lawyers and journalists from around the world.

At the inquest, Miles and Reynolds testified that they knew nothing of the head wound. The autopsy doctor, Heinz Karnitschnig, testified that the star-shaped wound was consistent with a fall, but did not exclude Whiting being pushed as a possibility. Karnitschnig also noted bruising and marks on the upper body consistent with Whiting being involved in a "scuffle or fight" shortly before death, but felt that these did not contribute to his death. A second autopsy, conducted by San Francisco-area pathologist Dr. Robert Wright at Campbell's request, concluded that the most violence which could possibly have been inflicted on Whiting, based on his injuries, was being held by the shoulders and shaken, and by some means hitting the back of his head against a solid surface. Wright suggested the head injury, while not directly a factor in his death, could have caused a concussion that may have impaired Whiting's decision-making abilities. The police recorded a variety of drugs in Miles' room, all medicinal, most for treating anxiety. Based on the drugs found in Whiting's body, methaqualone (known popularly in the U.S. as Quaaludes) and benadryl, Karnitschnig concluded that Whiting had taken Mandrax, an English prescription drug containing both substances (American companies did not sell benadryl); Miles said she believed Whiting no longer had his own prescription of Mandrax after his doctor in London decided to stop it, and that a few of her own pills were missing, but Karnitschnig said it could not be known how Whiting came into possession of the Mandrax. Miles said in the inquest that she believed Whiting had committed suicide, and that she did not fight back when he began to beat her on the night of his death.

Based on the amount of those drugs found, Whiting likely took two or three Mandrax pills. Different literature suggests different overdose levels for methaqualone ingestion; at the time of Whiting's death, new studies suggesting much lower levels could be fatal were popular. It is also unknown for how long Whiting took methaqualone in London and if he developed either a tolerance or sensitivity to it. Karnitschnig believed that the methaqualone, with the effect of the other substances in his body (the benadryl, some alcohol, and an "unquantitated" amount of unnamed tranquilizer or "Librium-type drug"), was sufficient to kill him. At the inquest, Campbell had produced affidavits questioning the low level of drug toxicity, and the different literature means that the dose he took lies "in a disputed netherland between therapy and poison, leaving unanswered the questions of whether he took the tablets to calm down or to kill himself, or whether he killed himself trying to calm down." Campbell solicited Bernard Beryl Brodie, a leading pharmacologist, to produce an affidavit saying the toxicity of drugs in Whiting's body "was not likely to cause death", and two pathologists (Wright and Federick Meyers) to draw further autopsy conclusions. These pathologists' reports disagreed with each other and the first autopsy. Meyers could not find any cause of death.

The inquest was adjourned for a week, in order for Los Angeles county medical examiner Thomas Noguchi to provide a report; Winsor had asked, due to pressure from Campbell, for a confirmation of the autopsy findings, but was told on March 15 that Noguchi "[hadn't] even started the tests; they didn't realize the importance of the case." Whiting's body was moved from Buckeye to San Francisco on March 17. On March 21, Whiting's cause of death was ruled to be an accidental overdose of methaqualone, though the coroner's jury noted his body had physical injuries that they could not account for. His blood was found in three motel rooms; the jury said it was likely he had been involved in a fight, but could not determine with whom or if this contributed to his death. Miles, among others, has suggested that Whiting was murdered, with many implicating Reynolds. The jury spent 55 minutes deliberating, and with many questions as to Whiting's injuries and motivations for taking the drugs, could only conclude based on "what evidence [they] had".

On March 22, the jury foreman, after delivering the accidental overdose verdict, said he thought the case should be re-investigated. The Gila Bend police chief indicated that he, too, wanted to continue investigating and review the original investigation. Newspapers began speculating on the nature of Whiting's death immediately; the Encyclopaedia of British Film and British Film Institute call it a suicide.

Miles returned to England following the inquest but media pressure in the aftermath made her decide to relocate to Los Angeles, where she could be "just another tiddler in a tank of sharks". Her family, similarly, felt forced to move. In 2007, she said that being accused of Whiting's murder was the lowest point in her life. The impact of the media response to Whiting's death and the inquest also caused strain on Miles and Bolt's marriage, and they divorced in 1976 but remarried 12 years later.

== Personal life ==
Whiting had an unstable emotional life. Writer Ron Rosenbaum said he was driven by a need to form a family bond; Rosenbaum suggested that Whiting felt he had found this with Miles, Bolt, and their son Thomas. The family lived on a country estate in Surrey; shortly after getting to know Miles, Whiting proposed he write an article for Time about the couple and moved in with them. In the following weeks, he seemed to make no progress and made it clear he did not want to leave. Miles would later describe him during this period as having "fits of depression and then fits of creativity when he showed his brilliance. Then he had those manic times when he got over the top with excitement." He continued to live with the family. Four months after moving in, Whiting threatened suicide, causing Miles and Bolt to not mention his departure for several more months. After he became anxious working on Lady Caroline Lamb with them, in September 1971, the couple suggested he move into Miles' London apartment. Whiting threatened to kill himself if they ever made him leave. As two other friends who had previously stayed with Miles had taken their own lives, she took the threat seriously; Whiting did move to the apartment in February 1972. A few weeks later, he took an overdose and was rushed to the hospital, moving back in with Bolt and Miles afterward. Miles recalled in later years that when Whiting lived with them, she prevented three suicide attempts.

Bolt said that when Whiting had good days, they liked to spend time with him, that "he could be witty, self-mocking and extraordinarily perceptive"; Bolt saw Whiting as a surrogate son but acknowledged that, on his bad days, Whiting lived in a fantasy world where "he became intensely jealous of anyone who displayed affection for [Miles]". While he lived with them, Miles and Bolt encouraged Whiting to visit a psychiatrist, but he refused. Miles later suggested that Whiting's madness was the price for his brilliance. Despite his familial relationship with Miles and Bolt, Whiting said in a January 1973 interview that he would one day marry Miles, even if he had to wait for Bolt to die. Miles has denied reports she and Whiting had a sexual relationship. He had also already married 22-year-old flight attendant Nancy Cockerill in Cook County, Illinois, in January 1970. It is suggested by Agronsky that he kept the marriage a secret from everyone, including his mother, to enjoy a playboy lifestyle. He used Cockerill's job to travel often at reduced cost, claiming when others asked that it was because his father was a Pan Am executive, one of many extravagant lies he used to create his persona. Neither his nor Cockerill's parents knew of the marriage.

Whiting has been described as ambitious and unbalanced, as well as very generous to his friends. There were rumors, though not serious ones, that Whiting was involved in drug trafficking, to explain his apparent vast wealth. One anecdote describes Whiting regularly flying from California to London to be fitted for a Savile Row suit, returning, and then flying back to London a week later to collect it.

== In popular media ==
The publicity for The Man Who Loved Cat Dancing sought to capitalize on the media interest surrounding Whiting's death, as well as the rumors that Reynolds and Miles were romantically involved, and created an advertising campaign and slogan that was "sexed up". Reynolds expressed displeasure at the slogan; it was modified to better represent the film, reading "Burt and Sarah in a torrid love story that shocked the Old West!". In 2000, film journalist Harry Haun wrote that making reference to Whiting's death (which he called a suicide) in promoting the film was a "tawdry tactic", and that Reynolds had to threaten MGM with a lawsuit to make them change the slogan.

In 2019, Whiting's death was included in a tabloid list of "famous unsolved Hollywood murders". His "bizarre" death was first profiled in tabloids on March 1, 1973, before the inquest was heard. In the early 1990s, book Tales of Hollywood the Bizarre included a chapter on Gila Bend and Whiting's death; the author wrote that Whiting's head injury came from a coffee table in Reynolds' motel room. In 1994, both Reynolds and Miles published autobiographies which mention the incident. Miles wrote a screenplay about Whiting, completed in 2019.

His death is fictionalized in the 2011 novel The Gatsby Game by Anne R. Allen, who had briefly dated Whiting in college, and recollections of Whiting's death formed the basis of the 2014 film The David Whiting Story by Walter Reuben, which won the Best Experimental/Independent Film award from the Los Angeles Film Critics Association at the 2014 Los Angeles Film Critics Association Awards. Reuben had also attended Haverford, and met Whiting at the film society Reuben founded there.

== See also ==
- List of Haverford College people
