= Dutch Uncle (novel) =

First edition

Dutch Uncle is a Western novel written by American author Marilyn Durham and published in 1973. The novel followed up Durham's great success with her debut novel, The Man Who Loved Cat Dancing, another Western also published by Harcourt.

The protagonist, Jake Hollander, is an aging gunfighter turned professional poker player who comes into a small New Mexico town to gamble but, through a series of unlikely circumstances, becomes its marshal and takes two Mexican orphans under his wing.

Dutch Uncle, like The Man Who Loved Cat Dancing, garnered critical praise for its character studies and clean writing style, but although a bestseller was not as great a success as Durham's preceding book; based on the success of The Man Who Loved Cat Dancing, the movie rights to the book had been committed before Durham had completed Dutch Uncle, but ultimately the studio declined to make the film.

Durham's next book, Flambard's Confession, an historical novel set in Medieval England, would not come for almost another decade.
