= The Trailsman =

Short Western novel series

The Trailsman is a series of short Western novels published since 1980 by Signet books, a division of New American Library. The series is still published under the name Jon Sharpe, the original author of the series, although it is now written by a number of ghostwriters under contract. The publisher releases 12 editions of the serial a year, with longer Giant Trailsman titles appearing periodically. The first title was Seven Wagons West: Seven Ways to Die, which was recently reissued in print.

Trailsman stories are short, usually under 200 pages, and feature the hero, Skye Fargo. Skye is known for his "lake blue" eyes, and despite his sexual prowess with women, he is single by choice. His sidekick is his unnamed horse, known only as "the Ovaro", and his gun of choice is a .44 Colt.

The Trailsman series was created by John Joseph Messmann aka Jon Messmann. He wrote most of the first 200 books in the series before retiring in the late 1990s. Messmann died in 2004. He also wrote many novels in the classic Nick Carter series. Messmann later created another western series featuring Canyon O'Grady, a western detective. In The Trailsman #87 Skye Fargo and Canyon O'Grady joined forces. Messmann got his start in writing by scripting comic books beginning in the 1940s.

David Robbins has been the principal writer of the Trailsman books since Messmann's retirement. Authors like Robert J Randisi, J. B. Keller, Bill Crider, Ed Gorman, Will C. Knott, Robert Vardeman, John Edward Ames, and James Reasoner have also written entries in the series. Some of the Trailsman books have been written by female novelists.
