= Ralph Compton =

American writer of western fiction

Ralph Compton (April 11, 1934 – September 16, 1998) was an American writer of western fiction.

A native of St. Clair County, Alabama, Compton stood six-foot-eight without his boots. He worked as a musician, a radio announcer, a songwriter, and a newspaper columnist. Mr. Compton began his writing career with a notable work, The Goodnight Trail, which was chosen as a finalist for the Western Writers of America "Medicine Pipe Bearer Award" bestowed upon the "Best Debut Novel". He was also the author of the Sundown Rider series and the Border Empire series. In the last decade of his life, he authored more than two dozen novels, some of which made it onto the USA Today bestseller list for fiction.

Ralph Compton died in Nashville, Tennessee at the age of 64. Since his death, Signet Books has continued the author's legacy, releasing new novels, written by authors such as Joseph A. West and David L. Robbins, under Compton's byline.

== Novels ==
- Autumn of the Gun
- Festival Of Spies
- Clarion's Call
- Devil's Canyon
- Navarro
- Bullet Creek
- Guns Of The Canyonlands
- By The Horns
- Rio Largo
- Deadwood Gulch
- The Killing Season
- Texas Empire
- The Bloody Trail
- Blood Duel
- Shadow Of The Gun
- Ride The Hard Trail
- Bullet For A Bad Man
- Outlaw's Reckoning
- Stryker's Revenge
- The Burning Range
- The Stranger From Abilene
- The Ghost Of Apache Creek
- Down On The Gila River
- Hard Ride To Wichita
- The Hunted
- Double-Cross Ranch

=== The Trail Drive Series ===
- The Goodnight Trail
- The Western Trail
- The Chisholm Trail
- The California Trail
- The Shawnee Trail
- The Virginia City Trail
- The Dodge City Trail
- The Oregon Trail
- The Santa Fe Trail
- The Old Spanish Trail
- The Green River Trail
- The Deadwood Trail
- The Bandera Trail

Trail Drive books written by other authors under Compton's byline:

- The Dakota Trail by Robert Vaughan (ISBN 0-451-20417-4)
- Bozeman Trail by Robert Vaughan (ISBN 0-451-20690-8)
- The Alamosa Trail by Robert Vaughan (ISBN 0-451-20582-0)
- The Abilene Trail by Dusty Richards (ISBN 978-0-451-21043-2)
- Trail to Fort Smith by Dusty Richards (ISBN 0-451-21123-5)
- The Palo Duro Trail by Jory Sherman (ISBN 0-451-21369-6)
- The Ogallala Trail by Dusty Richards
- The Ellsworth Trail by Jory Sherman
- The Tenderfoot Trail by Joseph A West
- Trail To Cottonwood Falls by Dusty Richards
- The Amarillo Trail by Jory Sherman
- The Badlands Trail by Lyle Brandt
- The Saltwater Trail by Jackson Lowry

=== Trail of the Gunfighter ===
- The Dawn of Fury (ISBN 0-451-18631-1)
- The Killing Season (ISBN 0-451-18787-3)
- Autumn of the Gun (ISBN 0-451-19045-9)

=== Border Empire ===
- The Border Empire (ISBN 0-451-19209-5)
- Sixguns and Double Eagles (ISBN 0-451-19331-8)
- Train To Durango (ISBN 0-451-19237-0)

=== Sundown Riders ===
- North to the Bitterroot
- Across the Rio Colorado
- The Winchester Run
- Devil's Canyon (ISBN 0-451-19519-1)
- Whiskey River (ISBN 0-451-19332-6)
- The Skeleton Lode (ISBN 0-451-19762-3)
- Runaway Stage
- Do Or Die
- Bucked Out In Dodge
- West of Pecos

Sundown Riders books written by other authors under Compton's byline:

- Demon's Pass by Robert Vaughan (ISBN 0-451-19763-1)
- The Trail's End by E.L. Ripley
- The Wolves of Seven Pines by E.L. Ripley
- Flames of Silver by Jackson Lowry
- Prairie Fire, Kansas by John Shirley
- Tin Star by Jackson Lowry
- Never Bet Against the Bullet by Jackson Lowry
- Calvert's Last Bluff by E.L. Ripley
- Seven Roads to vengeance by Carlton Stowers
- The Outlaw Hunters by D.B. Pulliam

=== Danny Duggin Series ===
- Death Rides A Chestnut Mare (ISBN 0-451-19761-5)
- The Shadow of a Noose
- Death Along the Cimarron by Ralph Cotton (ISBN 0-451-20769-6)
- Riders of Judgment by Ralph Cotton (ISBN 0-451-20214-7)

== Books written by other authors under Compton's byline ==
The following novels were written by a variety of authors under Compton's byline and published by the Ralph Compton Estate (not including the Trail Drive Series or Sundown Riders Series, which are already listed above). In every one of these books, the first chapter is preceded by Compton's five-paragraph eulogy to "The Immortal Cowboy" which begins with: "This is respectfully dedicated to the 'American cowboy.' His was the saga sparked by the turmoil that followed the Civil War, and the passing of more than a century has by no means diminished the flame."

John Edward Ames:

- Deadwood Gulch

Ralph Cotton:

- The Shadow of a Noose
- Riders of Judgment
- Death Along The Cimarron

Marcus Galloway:

- One Man's Fire
- The Bloody Trail
- Straight Shooter
- Death of a Bad Man
- The Dangerous Man
- Brimstone Trail
- Rusted Tin
- Outlaw's Reckoning
- Straight to the Noose
- Hard Ride to Wichita
- Vigilante Dawn

Tony Healey:

- Blood on the Prairie (The Gunfighter Series)

Jackson Lowry:

- Lost Banshee Mine
- The Big Deal
- Shot to Hell (The Gunfighter Series)

Matthew P. Mayo:

- Tucker's Reckoning
- Deadman's Ranch
- Shotgun Charlie

Terrence McCauley:

- Ride the Hammer Down

Robert J. Randisi:

- The Wrong Side of the Law (The Gunfighter Series)
- Ride for Justice (The Gunfighter Series)

Dusty Richards

- North to the Salt Fork

David L. Robbins:

- For the Brand
- A Wolf in the Fold
- Brother's Keeper
- Texas Hills
- Fatal Justice
- The Law and the Lawless
- West of Pecos
- Bluff City
- Nowhere, TX
- The Evil Men do
- Bucked Out in Dodge

Jeff Rovin:

- Death Valley Drifter (The Gunfighter Series)
- Blood of the Hunters (The Gunfighter Series)

John Shirley:

- Broken Rider (The Gunfighter Series)

Carlton Stowers

- Comanche Trail
- Phantom Hill
- Dalton's Justice (The Gunfighter Series)
- Reunion in Hell (The Gunfighter Series)
- Return to Gila Bend (The Gunfighter Series)
- The Breckenridge Boys (The Gunfighter Series)

Robert Vaughan:

- The Dakota Trail

Joseph A. West:

- Bounty Hunter
- Rawhide Flat
- Showdown at Two-Bit Creek
- Doomsday Rider (The Buck Fletcher series)
- Vengeance Rider (The Buck Fletcher series)
- Slaughter Canyon
- Shadow of the Gun
- The Last Manhhunt
- The Man From Nowhere
- Blood on the Gallows
- The Convict Trail
- Blood and Gold
- West of the Law
- Death of a Hangman
