= Bride to Be (film) =

- Directed by: Rafael Moreno Alba
- Written by: Rafael Moreno Alba
- Based on: novel Pepita Jiménez by Juan Valera
- Starring: Stanley Baker; Sarah Miles
- Cinematography: Jose Luis Alcaine
- Production company: Emarus Films
- Release date: 1975
- Running time: 106 mins
- Country: Spain
- Language: Spanish

Bride to Be is a 1975 Spanish film, directed by Rafael Moreno Alba and starring Sarah Miles and Stanley Baker. It was also known as Pepita Jiménez, title of the novel in which the film is based (Written and published by Juan Valera in 1874).

It was Baker's last feature film.

== Plot ==
A rich land owner in Spain has a mistress. She falls for his son who is about to become a priest.

== Cast ==
- Sarah Miles as Pepita Jiménez
- Stanley Baker as Pedro De Vargas
- Peter Day as Luis De Vargas
- Eduardo Bea as Curro
- Vicente Soler as Vicar
- Jose Maria Caffarell as Dean
- Mario Vico as Macarena
