= The Lion in Winter (1968 film) =

1968 film by Anthony Harvey

- Theatrical release poster
- Directed by: Anthony Harvey
- Screenplay by: James Goldman
- Based on: The Lion in Winter; 1966 play by James Goldman
- Produced by: Martin Poll
- Starring: Peter O'Toole; Katharine Hepburn; Jane Merrow; John Castle; Timothy Dalton; Anthony Hopkins; Nigel Stock; Nigel Terry
- Cinematography: Douglas Slocombe
- Edited by: John Bloom
- Music by: John Barry
- Production company: Haworth Productions
- Distributed by: AVCO Embassy Pictures
- Release date: October 30, 1968
- Running time: 134 minutes
- Countries: United Kingdom; United States
- Language: English
- Budget: $4 million
- Box office: $22.3 million

The Lion in Winter is a 1968 historical drama film centred on Henry II of England and his attempt to establish a line of succession during a family gathering at Christmas in 1183. His efforts unleash both political and personal turmoil involving himself, his estranged wife Eleanor of Aquitaine, their three surviving sons, the French king Philip II, and Philip's half-sister Alais, who is Henry's mistress. The film was directed by Anthony Harvey, written by James Goldman, and produced by Joseph E. Levine, Jane C. Nusbaum, and Martin Poll. It stars Peter O'Toole and Katharine Hepburn, with Jane Merrow, John Castle, Anthony Hopkins, Timothy Dalton (in his film debut), Nigel Stock, and Nigel Terry appearing in support.

Based on Goldman's play The Lion in Winter, the film was a critical and commercial success, winning three Academy Awards (including Hepburn's win for Best Actress, making her the first three-time winner in the category). O'Toole, who had previously played Henry II in Becket (1964), was also nominated for Best Actor. Having been nominated for Becket as well, this made him only the second person to be nominated twice for playing the same character, after Bing Crosby.

A television remake of the film was released in 2003.

== Plot ==
In 1183 in the Angevin Empire, 50-year-old Henry II of England seeks to name a successor and summons his family for Christmas at his castle in Chinon, Touraine. Henry wants his youngest son, John, to inherit his throne. His estranged wife, Eleanor of Aquitaine, favours their eldest surviving son, Richard. A scorned Eleanor, who has led several failed attempts to depose Henry, has been reprieved from imprisonment in England by Henry for the holiday.

Henry invites young Philip II of France, son and successor of Louis VII, Eleanor's first husband, to settle some business. Formerly queen of France, Eleanor had divorced Louis and married Henry, bringing with her the Duchy of Aquitaine, the richest province in Europe. Years later, a twice-remarried Louis made a treaty with Henry betrothing Philip's half-sister Alais to Henry's future heir. After arrival in England, nine-year-old Alais was raised by Eleanor; further complicating matters, a grown-up Alais has become Henry's mistress. Philip now demands either the promised wedding of Alais to Henry's heir or the return of her dowry, the strategically important county of Vexin, near Paris.

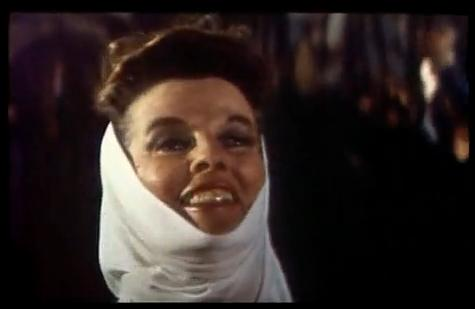
Katharine Hepburn as Eleanor of Aquitaine, an Oscar-winning performance

Henry's favored son, John, is manipulated by middle son Geoffrey II, Duke of Brittany, who bitterly resents being passed over by both parents. Treacherously, Geoffrey plots with John against Richard's claims to the throne. Actually plotting to expose an entitled and impatient John's treachery against his father, as well as Richard's scheming with Eleanor for the crown, Geoffrey manipulates for Henry to see him as the only viable heir. Geoffrey enlists the alliance of Philip, who encourages any discord among Henry's sons.

Demanding that Henry give Alais to Richard―secretly anticipating a shift in Philip's alliance―Eleanor threatens to spoil Henry's plans for John by supporting Philip's demands for the return of the Vexin. In return for Eleanor's surrendering the Aquitaine to John, Henry agrees to give Alais to Richard to wed and make him successor. Eleanor demands Alais's wedding to Richard take place that night. When the arrangement is revealed at the wedding, Richard, who covets Aquitaine for himself, refuses to go through with the marriage, just as Henry anticipated.

Perceiving treachery in Henry's ploy, John is manipulated by Geoffrey to go to Philip's chamber to plot war on Henry. When Richard seeks out Philip to enlist his support, John and Geoffrey hide behind a curtain to listen. When Henry himself seeks out Philip to discuss terms, Richard hides behind another curtain, unaware of John's and Geoffrey's concealment. Henry humiliates Philip by exposing his negotiating inexperience. In retaliation, Philip reveals to Henry that Richard molested him when he was younger; he pretended to love Richard to one day expose Richard to his father. When Richard emerges and decries this, Philip responds that he always loathed Richard's sight and touch. Disgusted, Henry says his consolation is that he has John as his heir. Geoffrey then steps forward, pulling the curtain aside to reveal John, and declaring that John has been plotting against Henry and that Geoffrey is Henry's only choice. Dismissing all three as unsuitable heirs, Henry imprisons them. He prepares to travel to Rome to demand the Pope's annulment of his marriage to Eleanor, intending to wed Alais and have new sons. Alais insists that Henry must kill or imprison his sons for life, as they will murder any new heir.

Eleanor bribes a guard to help release her sons, bringing them knives for defense. Unable to face condemning his sons to life imprisonment, Henry arrives to confront all three sons at once. The sons threaten their father with knives, but cannot bring themselves to kill him. Henry cannot bring himself to condemn his sons to death for treachery. Weeping, he lets the three escape. Resigned that he has been checked by Eleanor in his plans for divorce and a new heir, he falls pitifully into her arms. The two lament how their initial passion has devolved into its present adversarial state.

In the morning, Eleanor leaves on her barge to return to her imprisonment, waving and shouting farewells while Henry bellows cheerful nonsenses, each acknowledging their perverse emotional bond while anticipating the resumption of their struggle next year.

== Cast ==
- Peter O'Toole as Henry II, King of England, Lord of Ireland, Duke of Normandy and of Aquitaine, Count of Anjou
- Katharine Hepburn as Eleanor of Aquitaine, his estranged queen
- Jane Merrow as Alais, Philip's half-sister and Henry's mistress, betrothed to Henry's heir by treaty
- John Castle as Geoffrey, their middle son
- Timothy Dalton as Philip II, King of France
- Anthony Hopkins as Richard the Lionheart, their eldest surviving son
- Nigel Terry as John, their youngest son
- Nigel Stock as Captain William Marshall
- Kenneth Griffith as Strolling Player
- Kenneth Ives as Queen Eleanor's personal guard
- O. Z. Whitehead as Hugh de Puiset, the Bishop of Durham
- Henry Woolf as Strolling Player

== Production ==
=== Writing ===
The original stage production had not been a success, getting a bad review in The New York Times and losing $150,000. Producer Martin Poll optioned Goldman's novel Waldorf for the movies. They discussed Lion in Winter, which Poll had read and loved. He hired Goldman to write a screenplay.

=== Casting ===
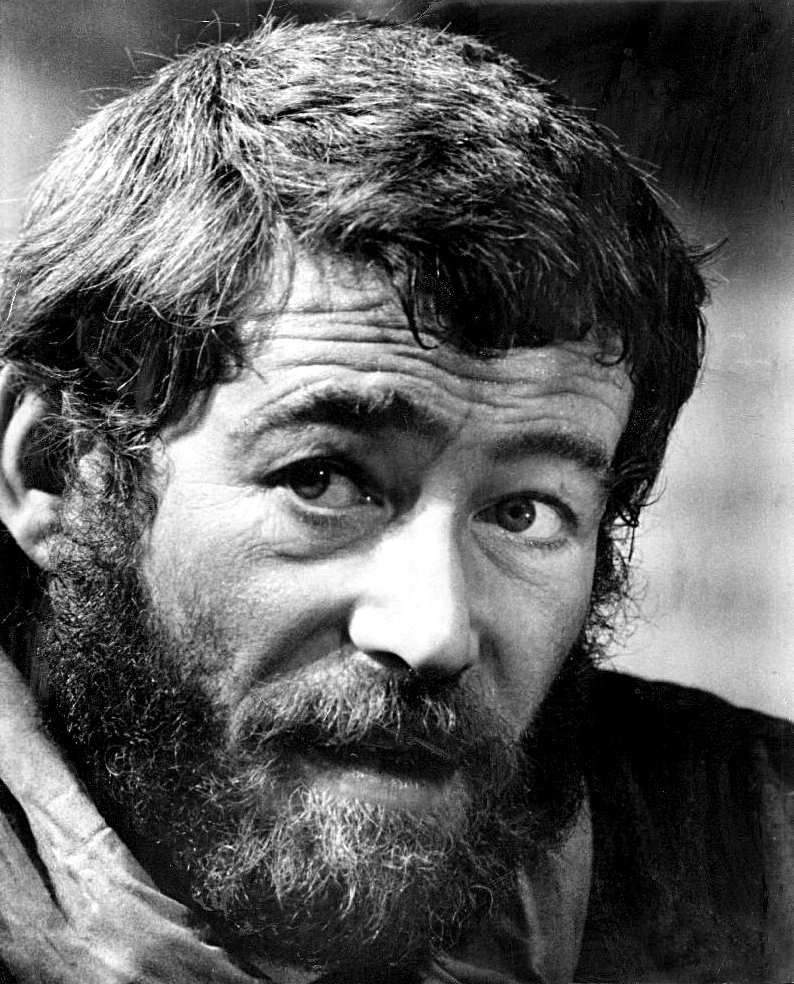
Peter O'Toole as Henry II

Poll was meant to make a film with Joseph Levine and Peter O'Toole, The Ski Bum (which would be written by James Goldman's brother William). That project fell through and Poll suggested they do Lion in Winter instead. O'Toole, who was 35, and had portrayed Henry II in 1964's Becket, plays him at age 50. Whilst Hepburn was 60 herself during filming, 25 years his senior.

In October 1967, the actors rehearsed at Haymarket Theatre in London. Production started in November 1967 and continued until May 1968.

=== Filming ===
The film was shot at Ardmore Studios in Bray, County Wicklow, Ireland, and on location in Ireland, Wales (Marloes Sands), and France at Abbaye de Montmajour, Arles; Château de Tarascon, Carcassonne; and Saône-et-Loire. In an interview Peter O'Toole said that Katharine Hepburn, who was sixty years old, was at her best early in the morning while he favoured starting work in the afternoon. They came to a compromise and shot their scenes from 8:30 to 16:00 each day.

The sculpted stone figures which appear during the main title sequence were discovered by the director along a driveway near a shooting location in France. They are portrayed as appearing on interior walls of the castle in the film.

After seeing the completed film, Albert R. Broccoli and Harry Saltzman offered Timothy Dalton the role of James Bond for the first time, as a replacement for Sean Connery in On Her Majesty's Secret Service (1969). Dalton declined because he felt he was too young, although he would later be cast in the role in The Living Daylights (1987) and Licence to Kill (1989).

== Reception ==
=== Box office ===
The film premiered on 30 October 1968 (29 December 1968 London premiere).

The film earned an estimated $6.4 million in distributor rentals in the domestic North American market during its initial year of release. It was the 14th most popular movie at the U.S. box office in 1969.

=== Critical ===
Renata Adler of The New York Times wrote that the film was "for the most part, outdoorsy and fun, full of the kind of plotting and action people used to go to just plain movies for."

Variety called it "an intense, fierce, personal drama put across by outstanding performance of Peter O'Toole and Katharine Hepburn. Anthony Harvey, a relatively new director, has done excellent work with a generally strong cast, literate adaptation by the author, and superb production values assembled by Martin H. Poll, who produced for Joseph E. Levine presentation under the Embassy banner."

Roger Ebert gave the film 4 stars out of 4, writing in 1968, "One of the joys which movies provide too rarely is the opportunity to see a literate script handled intelligently. The Lion in Winter triumphs at that difficult task; not since A Man for All Seasons have we had such capable handling of a story about ideas. But The Lion in Winter also functions at an emotional level, and is the better film, I think."

Charles Champlin of the Los Angeles Times declared, "Top honors for the most literate movie of the year, and for the finest and most imaginative and fascinating evocation of an historical time and place, can be awarded this very day to The Lion in Winter."

Pauline Kael of The New Yorker was less positive, writing that the film miscalculated in attempting to elevate the melodramatic plot "with serious emotions, more or less authentic costumes and settings, pseudo-Stravinsky music, and historical pomp. And it just won't do to have actors carrying on as if this were a genuine, 'deep' historical play on the order of A Man for All Seasons ... They're playing a camp historical play as if it were the real thing—delivering commercial near-poetry as if it were Shakespeare."

In a mixed review for The Monthly Film Bulletin, David Wilson called Katharine Hepburn's performance "perhaps the crowning achievement of an extraordinary career" but described the film as a whole as being "essentially a piece of highly polished theatricality, and not much else if one looks beyond its insistently sophisticated surface gloss."

Rotten Tomatoes collected 43 reviews through October 2021, amalgamating to a 91% approval and an average rating of 8.2/10. The critical consensus reads, "Sharper and wittier than your average period piece, The Lion in Winter is a tale of palace intrigue bolstered by fantastic performances from Peter O'Toole, Katharine Hepburn, and Anthony Hopkins in his big-screen debut."

In 2006, Writers Guild of America West ranked its screenplay 71st in WGA’s list of 101 Greatest Screenplays. The February 2020 issue of New York Magazine lists The Lion in Winter as among "The Best Movies That Lost Best Picture at the Oscars."

== Accolades ==
Award	Category	Nominee(s)	Result	Ref.
Academy Awards	Best Picture	Martin Poll	Nominated	
Academy Awards	Best Director	Anthony Harvey	Nominated	
Academy Awards	Best Actor	Peter O'Toole	Nominated	
Academy Awards	Best Actress	Katharine Hepburn	Won (Note: Tied with Barbra Streisand for Funny Girl.)	
Academy Awards	Best Adapted Screenplay	James Goldman	Won	
Academy Awards	Best Costume Design	Margaret Furse	Nominated	
Academy Awards	Best Original Score	John Barry	Won	
British Academy Film Awards	Best Actress in a Leading Role	Katharine Hepburn (Note: Also for Guess Who's Coming to Dinner.)	Won	
British Academy Film Awards	Best Actor in a Supporting Role	Anthony Hopkins	Nominated	
British Academy Film Awards	Best Screenplay	James Goldman	Nominated	
British Academy Film Awards	Best Cinematography	Douglas Slocombe	Nominated	
British Academy Film Awards	Best Costume Design	Margaret Furse	Nominated	
British Academy Film Awards	Best Film Music	John Barry	Won	
British Academy Film Awards	Best Sound	Chris Greenham and Simon Kaye	Nominated	
British Academy Film Awards	United Nations Award	Anthony Harvey	Nominated	
British Society of Cinematographers Awards	Best Cinematography in a Theatrical Feature Film	Douglas Slocombe	Won	
David di Donatello Awards	Best Foreign Production	Martin Poll	Won	
Directors Guild of America Awards	Outstanding Directorial Achievement in Motion Pictures	Anthony Harvey	Won	
Golden Globe Awards	Best Motion Picture – Drama		Won	
Golden Globe Awards	Best Director – Motion Picture	Anthony Harvey	Nominated	
Golden Globe Awards	Best Actor in a Motion Picture – Drama	Peter O'Toole	Won	
Golden Globe Awards	Best Actress in a Motion Picture – Drama	Katharine Hepburn	Nominated	
Golden Globe Awards	Best Supporting Actress – Motion Picture	Jane Merrow	Nominated	
Golden Globe Awards	Best Screenplay	James Goldman	Nominated	
Golden Globe Awards	Best Original Score	John Barry	Nominated	
Laurel Awards	Top Drama		Nominated	
Laurel Awards	Top Female Dramatic Performance	Katharine Hepburn	Won	
National Board of Review Awards	Top Ten Films		7th Place	
New York Film Critics Circle Awards	Best Film		Won	
New York Film Critics Circle Awards	Best Actor	Peter O'Toole	Nominated	
New York Film Critics Circle Awards	Best Screenplay	James Goldman	Nominated	
Writers Guild of America Awards	Best Written American Drama	James Goldman	Won	
Writers' Guild of Great Britain Awards	Best British Screenplay	James Goldman	Won	

=== Preservation ===
The Academy Film Archive preserved The Lion in Winter in 2000.

== Historical accuracy ==
Map of France in 1180. The Vexin is located northwest of Paris, between it and Rouen, straddling the Duchy of Normandy and the Royal Domaine surrounding Paris.

Though the background and the eventual destinies of the characters are generally accurate, The Lion in Winter is fictional: while there was a Christmas court at Caen in 1182, there was none at Chinon in 1183. In reality, Henry had many mistresses and many illegitimate children; the "Rosamund" mentioned in the film was his mistress until she died. The Revolt of 1173–1174 provides the historical background leading to the play's events. There was also a second rebellion, when Young Henry and Geoffrey revolted in 1183, resulting in Young Henry's death. While some historians have theorized that Richard was homosexual, it is not certain.

Geoffrey died in 1186 in a jousting tournament held in Paris (with some speculation that Geoffrey was involved in plotting against Henry with Philip at the time). A third rebellion against Henry by Richard and Philip in 1189 was successful, and a decisively defeated Henry retreated to Chinon in Anjou, where he died. Richard the Lionheart succeeded Henry II, but spent very little time in England (perhaps 6 months), after which he became a central Christian commander during the Third Crusade, leading the campaign after the departure of Philip. Richard won some considerable victories, but he did not succeed in retaking Jerusalem. John succeeded Richard in 1199 after Richard's death. During his unsuccessful reign he lost most of his father's holdings in Northern France and angered the English barons, who revolted and forced him to accept and add his seal to Magna Carta. John is also known for being the villain in the Robin Hood legends. Lastly, William Marshal, who during the film is harried about by Henry II, outlived the English main characters and eventually ruled England as regent for the young Henry III.

== See also ==
- List of historical drama films
- List of Christmas films

== Bibliography ==
- Paden, William (2004). Utz, Richard; Swan, Jesse G (eds.). I Learned It at the Movies: Teaching Medieval Film in: Postmodern Medievalisms. Cambridge: Brewer. pp. 79–98.
- Bergan, Ronald (1996). Katharine Hepburn: An Independent Woman. Arcade Publishing. p. 155. ISBN 9781559703512.
- Callan, Michael Feeney (2004). Anthony Hopkins: A Three Act Life. London: Robson Books. pp. 98, 100, 105. ISBN 186105761X.
- Wapshott, Nicholas (1984). Peter O'Toole: A Biography. Beaufort Books. p. 145. ISBN 9780825301964.
