= Fernando Ghia =

Italian film producer and talent agent (1935–2005)

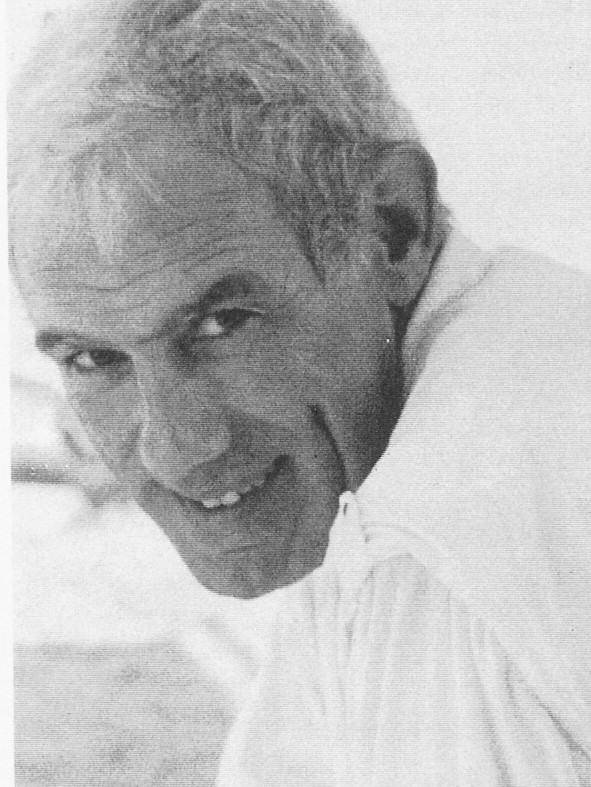
- Ghia in 1986.
- Born: July 22, 1935; Rome, Lazio, Italy
- Died: June 1, 2005 (aged 69); Rome, Lazio, Italy
- Education: Accademia Nazionale d'Arte Drammatica Silvio D'Amico
- Spouse: Gaia De Laurentiis
- Children: 1

Fernando Ghia (July 22, 1935 – June 1, 2005) was an Italian film and theatre producer and talent agent. He was nominated for an Academy Award for Best Picture and a BAFTA Award for Best Film for producing The Mission (1986).

== Early years ==
Ghia was born in Rome in 1935. He trained as an actor at Accademia Nazionale d'Arte Drammatica Silvio D'Amico, and made his stage debut in 1956 for the company of Giorgio Albertazzi and Anna Proclemer. He took up theatre producing in 1959, overseeing productions of The Miracle Worker and Becket, Or, The Honor of God.

== Agent and producer ==
In the 1960s, Ghia had a stint working as an agent for the William Morris Agency, and was taught to speak English by Albert Finney (whom he represented). His other clients Anouk Aimée, Raf Vallone, Rossano Brazzi, Anita Ekberg, Vittorio Gassman, Annie Girardot, Stefania Sandrelli and Gian Maria Volonté. He was an assistant to producer Franco Cristaldi during the decade, later becoming his head of production.

In 1972 he read an article about the Jesuit order and political trouble in South America in Time magazine which generated a lifelong interest in it and formed the basis of several of the films he produced, including The Mission and the Anglo-Italian series Nostromo. He also produced Lady Caroline Lamb (1972), the only film directed by Robert Bolt. He spent over a decade in Hollywood, returning to his native Italy in the late 1980s and establishing Pixit Productions in Rome.

== Personal life ==
In the 1990s Ghia married actress Gaia De Laurentiis (no relation to Dino). They had a son, Sebastian, in 1996. For several years, Ghia resided at a suite at The Dorchester in London.

=== Death ===
At his funeral in June 2005, Ennio Morricone's stirring theme for The Mission was reportedly played.

== Filmography ==
=== Film ===
Year	Title	Director	Notes
1969	The Red Tent	Mikhail Kalatozov	Associate producer
1972	Winged Devils	Duccio Tessari	Executive producer
1972	Lady Caroline Lamb	Robert Bolt	
1982	Spaghetti House	Giulio Paradisi	
1986	The Mission	Roland Joffé	
1990	Tre colonne in cronaca	Carlo Vanzina	

=== Television ===
Year	Title	Director	Notes
1989	The Endless Game	Bryan Forbes	Miniseries; 2 episodes
1997	Nostromo	Alastair Reid	Miniseries; 4 episodes

== Accolades ==
Institution	Year	Category	Work	Result	Ref.
Academy Awards	1987	Best Picture	The Mission	Nominated	
British Academy Film Awards	1987	Best Film	The Mission	Nominated	
David di Donatello	1987	Best Foreign Film	The Mission	Won	
