= David L. Robbins (Oregon writer) =

American novelist

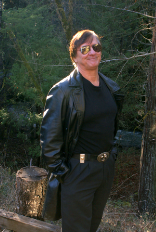
- Author David L. Robbins (Oregon)
- Born: July 4, 1950 (age 76)
- Citizenship: United States
- Occupation: Writer
- Writing career
- Pen name: David Robbins, David Thompson, Jake McMasters, Jon Sharpe, Ralph Compton, John Killdeer, J.D.Cameron, Dean McElwain, Don Pendleton, Franklyn W. Dixon
- Language: English
- Period: 1981 to present
- Genres: Westerns, Horror, Science Fiction, Fantasy, Non-Fiction, Young Adult, Mystery, Men's Adventure
- Notable works: MEN OF HONOR, the Wilderness Series, the Endworld series
- Website: www.david-robbins.com

David L. Robbins (born July 4, 1950) is an American author of English and Pennsylvania Dutch descent. He writes both fiction and non-fiction. He has written over three hundred books under his own name and many pen names, among them: David Thompson, Jake McMasters, Jon Sharpe, Don Pendleton, Franklin W. Dixon, Ralph Compton, Dean L. McElwain, J.D. Cameron and John Killdeer.

He has written for the following series: The Trailsman, Mack Bolan, Endworld, Blade, Wilderness, White Apache, Davy Crockett, Omega Sub and The Hardy Boys Casefiles. Robbins is a member of the Science Fiction and Fantasy Writers of America, the Horror Writers Association, and Western Writers of America.

== Biography ==
Robbins was raised in Pennsylvania. Until he was eight he lived in an outlying area of Philadelphia. Robbins spent many of his teen years on a farm owned by his Mennonite great aunt and uncle in Pennsylvania Dutch country. Water was brought in from an outdoor pump, and they used an outhouse.

At seventeen Robbins enlisted in the United States Air Force and became a sergeant. After his honorable discharge he attended college and went into broadcasting. He worked as an announcer and engineer and later as a program director at various radio stations. Later still he entered law enforcement and then took to writing full-time.

At one time or another Robbins has lived in Pennsylvania, Texas, Oklahoma, Kansas, Montana, Colorado and the Pacific Northwest. He spent a year and a half in Europe, traveling through France, Italy, Greece and Germany. He lived for more than a year in Turkey.

His writing has been critically praised by the Pulp Rack, among others. He is known for two current long-running series.

- Wilderness is the generational saga of a Mountain Man and his Shoshone wife. Started in 1990 under his David Thompson pen name, the series has nearly eighty books to date. Robbins has since stopped using pen names on his own works, and WILDERNESS is now under his own name.
- Endworld is a science fiction series under his own name started in 1986. There are forty-two books, and it is still being published.

His works have been published in nine languages.

Robbins suffers from familial hemiplegic migraine. His father had the same condition, and would isolate himself in a dark room for days at a time to recover. Robbins' eyes are extremely light sensitive, and for years he has worn custom prescription Aviator sunglasses to reduce the frequency of the attacks.

== Bibliography ==
=== Single novels as David Robbins ===
- The Return Of The Virginian
- Diablo
- Blood Feud
- Thunder Valley
- Town Tamers
- Angel l U: Let There Be Light
- Ride To Valor
- Badlanders
- Guns on the Prairie
- Angel U: Demigod
- Hit Radio

=== Endworld ===
Written as David Robbins

Endworld is a Scifi series launched in 1986 under the name David Robbins. The novels take place in a post-apocalyptic United States.

=== Blade ===
Blade is a 13 novel sequel to Endworld written as David Robbins.

1. First Strike
2. Outlands Strike
3. Vampire Strike
4. Pipeline Strike
5. Pirate Strike
6. Crusher Strike
7. Terror Strike
8. Devil Strike
9. L.A. Strike
10. Dead Zone Strike
11. Quest Strike
12. Death Master Strike
13. Vengeance Strike

=== Suspense ===
- Blood Cult

=== Horror novels ===
Written as David Robbins

- The Wereling
- The Wrath
- Spectre
- Hell-O-Ween
- Prank Night
- Spook Night
- A Girl, The End Of The World And Everything

=== Movie adaptations ===
- Men Of Honor
- Proof Of Life
- Twisted

=== Non-fiction ===
- Heavy Traffic

=== Wilderness ===
Written as David Thompson

1. King Of The Mountain
2. Lure Of The Wild
3. Savage Rendezvous
4. Blood Fury
5. Tomahawk Revenge
6. Black Powder Trail
7. Vengenance Trail
8. Death Hunt
9. Mountain Devil
10. Blackfoot Massacre
11. Northwest Passage
12. Apache Blood
13. Mountain Manhunt
14. Tenderfoot
15. Winterkill
16. Blood Truce
17. Trapper's Blood
18. Mountain Cat
19. Iron Warrior
20. Wolf Pack
21. Black Powder
22. Trail's End
23. The Lost Valley
24. Mountain Madness
25. Frontier Mayhem
26. Blood Feud
27. Gold Rage
28. The Quest
29. Mountain Nightmare
30. Savages
31. Blood Kin
32. The Westward Tide
33. Fang And Claw
34. Trackdown
35. Frontier Fury
36. The Tempest
37. Perils In The Wind
38. Mountain Man
39. Firewater
40. Scar
41. By Duty Bound
42. Flames Of Justice
43. Vengeance
44. Shadow Realms
45. In Cruel Clutches
46. Untamed Country
47. Reap The Whirlwind
48. Lord Grizzly
49. Wolverine
50. People Of The Forest
51. Comanche Moon
52. Glacier Terror
53. The Rising Storm
54. Pure Of Heart
55. Into The Unknown
56. In Darkest Depths
57. Fear Weaver
58. Cry Freedom
59. Only The Strong
60. The Outcast
61. The Scalp Hunters
62. The Tears of God
63. Venom
64. Devil Moon
65. Seed Of Evil
66. Garden Of Eden
67. The Gift
68. Savage Hearts

=== Giant Wilderness ===
- Hawken Fury
- Season Of The Warrior
- Prairie Blood
- Ordeal
- The Trail West
- Frontier Strike
- Spanish Slaughter

=== White Apache ===
Written as: Jake McMasters

- Hangman's Knot
- Warpath
- Warrior Born
- Quick Killer
- Blood Bath
- Blood Treachery
- Blood Bounty
- The Trackers
- Desert Fury
- Hanged

=== Davy Crockett ===
Written as: David Thompson

- Homecoming
- Sioux Slaughter
- Blood Hunt
- Mississippi Mayhem
- Blood Rage
- Comanche Country
- Texican Terror
- Cannibal Country

=== Compton Novels ===
Written as Ralph Compton

- Do Or Die
- Nowhere, Tx
- Bucked Out In Dodge
- West Of Pecos
- For The Brand
- By The Horns
- Rio Largo
- A Wolf In The Fold
- Bluff City
- Blood Duel
- Bullet For A Badman
- Ride The Hard Trail
- Fatal Justice
- The Evil Men Do
- Brother's Keeper
- The Law and the Lawless
- Texas Hills

=== The Executioner ===
Written as Don Pendleton

- #169: White Heat
- #178: Black Hand
- #191: Extreme Force
- #199: Rogue Agent
- #230: Deep Attack
- #267: Invisible Invader
- #294: Scorpion Rising
- #313: Lockdown
- #322: Time Bomb

=== SuperBolans ===
Written as Don Pendleton

- #44: Shock Tactic
- #46: Precision Kill
- #51: Thermal Strike
- #61: Blood Feud
- #68: Code of Conflict
- #75: Evil Alliance
- #82: War Load
- #90: Age of War

=== The Trailsman ===
Written as Jon Sharpe

- #118: Arizona Slaughter
- #120: Wyoming Manhunt
- #122: Gold Fever
- #123: Desert Death
- #125: Blood Prairie
- #127: Nevada Warpath
- #128: Snake River Butcher
- #131: Bear Town Bloodshed
- #135: Mountain Mayhem
- #138: Silver Fury
- #141: Tomahawk Justice
- #144: Abilene Ambush
- #146: Nebraska Nightmare
- #149: Springfielf Sharpshooters
- #152: Prairie Fire
- #155: Oklahoma Ordeal
- #158: Texas Terror
- #161: Rogue River Feud
- #164: Nez Perce Nightmare
- #166: Colorado Carnage
- #169: Soccoro Slaughter
- #170: Utah Trackdown
- #173: Washington Warpath
- #174: Death Valley Bloodbath
- #177: Colorado Wolfpack
- #178: Apache Arrows
- #183: Bayou Bloodbath
- #184: Rocky Mountain Nightmare
- #187: Sioux War Cry
- #190: Pecos Death
- #192: Durango Duel
- #197: Utah Uprising
- #199: Wyoming Wildcats
- #201: Salmon River Rage
- #205: Mountain Mankillers
- #208: Arizona Renegades
- #211: Badlands Bloodbath
- #214: Texas Hellion
- #216: High Sierra Horror
- #217: Dakota Deception
- #220: Montana Gunsharps
- #222: Colorado Diamond Dupe
- #226: Nebraska Slaying Ground
- #228: Wyoming Warcry
- #232: Pacific Phantoms
- #235: Flathead Fury
- #237: Dakota Damnation
- #244: Pacific Polecats
- #247: Seven Devils Slaughter
- #251: Utah Uproar
- #257: Colorado Cutthroats
- #261: Desert Death Trap
- #264: Snake River Ruins
- #272: Nevada Nemesis
- #275: Ozarks Onslaught
- #278: Mountain Manhunt
- #284: Dakota Prairie Pirates
- #295: Oasis Of Blood
- #300: Backwoods Bloodbath
- #303: Terror Trackdown
- #306: Nebraska Night Riders
- #310: Alaskan Vengeance
- #312: Shanghied Six-Guns
- #313: Missouri Manhunt
- #317: Mountain Mystery
- #321: Flathead Fury
- #322: Apache Ambush
- #327: Idaho Gold Fever
- #328: Texas Triggers
- #329: Bayou Trackdown
- #333: Black Hills Badman
- #340: Hannibal Rising
- #341: Sierra Six-Guns
- #342: Rocky Mountain Revenge
- #343: Texas Hellions
- #347: Dakota Death Trap
- #349: New Mexico Gundown
- #350: High Country Horror
- #351: Terror Town
- #352: Texas Tangle
- #353: Bitterroot Bullets
- #356: Grizzly Fury
- #357: Stagecoach Sidewinders
- #359: Platte River Gauntlet
- #360: Texas Lead Slingers
- #362: Range War
- #363: Death Devil
- #365: High Country Greed
- #366: Mountains Of No Return
- #367: Texas Tempest
- #370: Blind Man's Bluff
- #371: California Killers
- #373: Utah Terror
- #374: Forth Death
- #375: Texas Swamp Fever
- #377: Bounty Hunt
- #378: Wyoming Winterkill
- #380: Texas Tornado
- #381: Bowie's Knife
- #382: Terror Trackdown
- #383: High Plains Massacre
- #385: Thunderhead Trail
- #387: Apache Vendetta
- #389: Outlaw Trackdown
- #391: Night Terror
- #392: Colorado Carnage
- #393: Six-Gun Inferno
- #394: Burning Bullets
- #398: Arizona Ambushers

=== Giant Trailsman ===
- Woodland Warriors
- New Mexico Nightmare
- Menagerie Of Malice
- Island Devils
- Idaho Blood Spur
- Desert Duel (Feb. 07)

=== Mountain Majesty ===
- #1: Wild Country (1992)
- #2: The Untamed (1992)
- #3: Wilderness Rendezvous (1992)
- #4: Blood Kin (1993)
- #5: Passage West (1993)
- #6: The Far Horizon (1994)
- #7: Fire on the Prairie (1995)
- #8: The Savage Land (1995)

=== Preacher's Law ===
- #5: Slaughter At Ten Sleep

=== Omega Sub ===
- #2: Command Decision
- #4: Blood Tide
- #5: Death Dive
- #6: Raven Rising

=== The Hardy Boys Casefiles ===
Written as: Franklin W. Dixon

- 57: Terror on Track
