= Nostromo (TV series) =

- VHS cover
- Based on: Nostromo by Joseph Conrad
- Screenplay by: John Hale
- Directed by: Alastair Reid
- Starring: Colin Firth; Claudio Amendola; Lothaire Bluteau; Claudia Cardinale; Joaquim de Almeida; Brian Dennehy; Albert Finney; Ruth Gabriel; Fernando Hilbeck; Serena Scott Thomas
- Music by: Ennio Morricone
- Countries of origin: United Kingdom; Italy
- Original language: English
- No. of episodes: 4

Production
- Executive producer: Michael Wearing
- Producer: Fernando Ghia
- Cinematography: Franco Di Giacomo
- Editor: Frances Parker
- Running time: 55 minutes
- Production company: Pixit Productions

Original release
- Network: Rai 1
- Release: 5 January – 12 January 1997
- Network: BBC 2
- Release: 1 February – 22 February 1997

Nostromo is a 1997 British-Italian television drama series directed by Alastair Reid and produced by Fernando Ghia of Pixit Productions, a co-production with Radiotelevisione Italiana, Televisión Española, and WGBH Boston. The music is composed by Ennio Morricone. It stars Claudio Amendola, Paul Brooke, Lothaire Bluteau, Claudia Cardinale, Colin Firth and Albert Finney. It is described as "an adaptation of Joseph Conrad's epic story Nostromo of political upheaval, greed and romance in turn-of-the-20th-century South America."

== Cast ==
- Claudio Amendola as Nostromo
- Paul Brooke as Captain Mitchell
- Lothaire Bluteau as Martin Decoud
- Claudia Cardinale as Teresa Viola
- Joaquim de Almeida as Colonel Sotillo
- Brian Dennehy as Joshua C. Holroyd
- Albert Finney as Dr. Monygham
- Colin Firth as Charles Gould
- Roberto Escobar as Pedro Montero
- Ruth Gabriel as Antonia Avellanos
- Fernando Hilbeck as Don Jose Avellanos
- Serena Scott Thomas as Emilia Gould
- Salvatore Basile as General Montero
- Xavier Burbano as Ramirez
- Emiliano Díez as Don Pepe
- Romina Mondello as Giselle Viola
- Stefania Montorsi as Linda Viola
- Arnoldo Foà as Giorgio Viola

== Release and reception ==
The series was filmed in Cartagena de Indias, Colombia over twenty weeks in 1995. It had a budget of about 20 million dollars. It premiered on 25 June 1996 at the 48th Prix Italia Festival. Nostromo was later broadcast on the American channel PBS's Masterpiece Theatre and Italian channel Rai 1 on 5 January 1997, and was shown on BBC 2 in the UK from 1 February 1997.

The series was nominated for an ALMA Award for Outstanding Latino/a Cast in a Made-for-Television Movie or Mini-Series and Claudio Amendola won the Golden Pegasus Award for Best Television Actor at the Italian Flaiano International Prizes.
