= Lady Caroline Lamb (film) =

- Theatrical release poster, artwork by Ted CoConis
- Directed by: Robert Bolt
- Written by: Robert Bolt
- Produced by: Franco Cristaldi; Fernando Ghia; Bernard Williams
- Starring: Sarah Miles; Jon Finch; Richard Chamberlain; Laurence Olivier
- Cinematography: Oswald Morris
- Edited by: Norman Savage
- Music by: Richard Rodney Bennett
- Production company: Pulsar Productions
- Distributed by: MGM-EMI (UK); United Artists (US)
- Release date: 22 November 1972
- Running time: 123 minutes
- Country: United Kingdom
- Language: English
- Budget: $3,500,000 or £2 million

Lady Caroline Lamb is a 1972 British epic romantic drama film based on the life of Lady Caroline Lamb, novelist, sometime lover of Lord Byron and wife of politician William Lamb, 2nd Viscount Melbourne (later Prime Minister). The only film written and directed by Robert Bolt, it starred his wife, Sarah Miles, as Lady Caroline, Jon Finch, Richard Chamberlain, Laurence Olivier, Ralph Richardson, John Mills, Margaret Leighton and Michael Wilding.

== Plot synopsis ==
Caroline Ponsonby (Sarah Miles) accepts a marriage proposal from William Lamb (Jon Finch). Despite the misgivings of his mother, the marriage seems happy enough at first, a love match, but on their honeymoon in Italy William becomes concerned about Lady Caroline's wilful behaviour, which leads to a man's death. Back in England William is seen as a political "coming man", respected by parliamentarians both Whig and Tory. Meanwhile Lady Caroline meets the poverty stricken Lord Byron (Richard Chamberlain), and visits his modest flat. To her husband, she claims to find Byron "disturbing" and that she will not see him again.

Byron has a sudden success with his long poem Childe Harold's Pilgrimage, and becomes a wealthy celebrity, feted in society. An early literary superstar, he also becomes an object of fascination among women, some of whom write to him provocative fan letters. Lady Caroline and Byron begin a scandalous affair. Eventually he tires of her, and after she appears with Byron at a Holland House costume ball as a black slave, half naked and covered in greasepaint, she finds herself humiliated and a figure of derision in society.

At the ball, Byron becomes interested in another woman, his future wife, Anne Isabella Millbanke (Silvia Monti). Lady Caroline's behaviour becomes more bizarre when, dressed as a coach boy, she stalks Byron to a ceremonial dinner commemorating Wellington's victory against the French. Crashing the gathering, she interrupts Byron and Millbanke, cutting her forearm with a knife. William is taken to meet King George IV, who pressures him to leave Lady Caroline so he can take up the prestigious post of Chief Secretary for Ireland, but William is reluctant to abandon her.

Lady Caroline's mental health has deteriorated further but, with the support of her husband, she appears to recover. However, after she understands that her notoriety is undermining her husband's career, her wilfulness returns. She flees to France, where she has a brief affair with Wellington. Spurned by him, she returns to England and prepares a legal separation, with the approval of William's mother. Lady Caroline descends further into despair and illness, dying apparently from a broken heart.

== Cast ==
- Sarah Miles as Lady Caroline Lamb
- Jon Finch as William Lamb
- Richard Chamberlain as Lord Byron
- John Mills as Canning
- Margaret Leighton as Lady Melbourne
- Pamela Brown as Lady Bessborough
- Silvia Monti as Miss Millbanke
- Ralph Richardson as King George IV.
- Laurence Olivier as Duke of Wellington
- Michael Wilding as Lord Holland
- Fanny Rowe as Lady Holland
- Peter Bull as Minister
- Charles Carson as Potter
- Sonia Dresdel as Lady Pont
- Nicholas Field as St. John
- Trevor Peacock as Boxing Agent
- Norman Mitchell as Waiter
- Bernard Kay as Benson
- John Moffatt : Murray
- Caterina Boratto

== Background ==
The film was the directorial debut of screenwriter Robert Bolt and starred his wife Sarah Miles in the title role. Bolt said he was attracted to the story of Lamb because it "was funny, touching and entertaining" and felt the movie was about "the struggle between the romantics of the world and the classicists.... The classical, ignoble view of life, as espoused by Wellington in the film, keep society going... but it's the romantics, like Caroline, who drive life, who instigate new ideas, and who often are the true geniuses."

Bolt wrote the script as a vehicle for Miles and decided to direct himself. Fernando Ghia agreed to produce. Bolt said it was difficult to raise finance because people said they had not heard of Lady Caroline Lamb. In July 1971 it was announced the film, then called Lamb would be the first film financed by Tomorrow Entertainment, a subsidiary of General Electric, in association with Pulsar Productions and Vides Cinematographa of Rome. Richard Chamberlain and Sarah Miles would star, with cameos from Laurence Olivier, Margaret Leighton and John Mills.

However these plans fell through. Eventually finance was raised from Anglo-EMI and General Electric, along with Franco Cristaldi in Italy. Bolt had to waive all his fee in order to keep artistic control. EMI's investment, through Nat Cohen, was reportedly £250,000 and was covered by pre-sales overseas.

Timothy Dalton was originally cast as Lamb. However Bolt then decided to cast Jon Finch in the role. Dalton sued and won damages.

"I've been playing zanies and eccentrics for the past few years," said Chamberlain, "so Byron is new for me. He was like this incredible pop star."

== Production ==
Filming started 20 September 1971 at Pinewood Studios. By that stage Bolt said he had been working on the film for ten months.

"I'm not a good director but I know what the author intended", said Bolt. He elected to use new collaborators rather than David Lean's crew apart from Norman Savage, who died shortly after the film premiered. Filming was plagued by the presence of David Whiting who was working as an assistant to Miles and Bolt.

One scene was cut after it earned the film an X-Certificate; Bolt refused to re-shoot it, which meant that several crucial moments of exposition, much of it necessary for understanding the film's narrative, were left out.

Bolt did not direct another film. "Never again", he remarked years later.

The film is also notable because it is the last film in which Michael Wilding appeared, in a cameo with his last wife, Margaret Leighton, who played Lady Melbourne. The film score was composed by Richard Rodney Bennett, who later based a concert work, Elegy for Lady Caroline Lamb for viola and orchestra, on some of the material.

== Reception ==
=== Critical ===
Praise came for Laurence Olivier's cameo as the Duke of Wellington, with Philip French of The Times writing that "... Olivier's brief appearance as the Duke of Wellington is a beautifully witty and rounded characterization that is worth the price of the admission in itself".

The Los Angeles Times called it "beautiful but dumb."

Pauline Kael felt Bolt "thrashes about from one style and point of view to another. The film seems to have been made by a square Ken Russell; Bolt tries for romantic excess, but he can’t get anything warmed up. His Caroline Lamb is an hysterical fool but also a misunderstood free spirit struggling against a hypocritical society—a sort of Regency Zelda. Sarah Miles acts like a dizzy shopgirl dreaming of being a great lady, and falling flat even in her dreams; as Byron, Richard Chamberlain scowls and sneers."

=== Box office ===
The film was one of the most popular films of 1973 at the British box office. In November 1973 Nat Cohen of Anglo-EMI said "we've done very well with Lady Caroline Lamb which turned out to be popular entertainment." However the film was a commercial disappointment in the US. Bolt and Ghia would collaborate again on The Mission.

In 1986 Nat Cohen said the film was the greatest disappointment of his career because he had such high hopes for it.

=== Awards ===
It was nominated for three BAFTA awards.

== Notes ==
- Turner, Adrian (1998). Robert Bolt : scenes from two lives. Hutchinson. ISBN 978-0-09-180176-2.
