= The Endless Game =

Television miniseries that premiered on Channel 4 in UK

- Genre: Spy; Thriller; Drama
- Based on: The Endless Game by Bryan Forbes
- Written by: Bryan Forbes
- Directed by: Bryan Forbes
- Starring: Albert Finney; George Segal; Monica Guerritore; Ian Holm; Kristin Scott Thomas
- Composer: Ennio Morricone
- Countries of origin: United Kingdom; Italy
- No. of episodes: 2

Production
- Executive producer: Graham Benson; Nicola Carraro
- Producer: Fernando Ghia
- Production location: Salzburg, Austria; Finland; Shepperton Studios, Surrey, England
- Cinematography: Brian Tufano
- Editor: Philip Shaw
- Running time: Aprox. 60 minutes
- Production company: Channel 4; Prism Entertainment; Pixit; Reteitalia; Television South

Original release
- Network: Channel 4
- Release: 20 August – 27 August 1989

The Endless Game is a spy thriller television miniseries, which premiered in two installments on Channel 4 on 20 August 1989. It is written and directed by Bryan Forbes, based on his own 1985 novel. It stars Albert Finney, George Segal, Monica Guerritore, Kristin Scott Thomas, and Ian Holm. The musical score was composed by Ennio Morricone.

== Plot ==
MI6 operative Alec Hillsden comes out of retirement to investigate the murder of several of his former colleagues, including his former lover.

== Cast ==
- Albert Finney as Alec Hillsden
- George Segal as Mr. Miller
- Monica Guerritore as Silvia
- Ian Holm as Control
- Kristin Scott Thomas as Caroline
- Benedick Blythe as Gunther
- Julian Holloway as Waddington
- Michael Medwin as Bayldon
- John Standing as Belfrage
- Sandor Elès as Hansel
- Derek de Lint as Abramov
- Nanette Newman as Margot
- Anthony Quayle as Glanville
- Seva Novgorodtsev as Lemzenko
- Mark Kingston as Dr. Hogg
- Jennie Linden as Matron
- Jayne Brook as Mrs. Glazer
- Ingrid Lacey as Inga
- Pat Keen as Tanya

== Distribution ==
The series appearing on Showtime in the United States in 1990.
