= Ralph Cotton =

American novelist

Ralph W. Cotton was an American author working in the western genre. He was born March 16, 1945 near Caneyville, Kentucky. He died on February 14, 2024, in New Albany, Indiana.

Cotton's debut novel, While Angels Dance: The Life and Times of Jeston Nash, was published on June 1, 1994, by St. Martin's Press. He subsequently published over 80 novels, including three under Ralph Compton's byline after Compton's death.
