= Endworld =

Series of novels by David L. Robbins

Endworld is a series of post-apocalyptic novels written by David L. Robbins. The first book was published in 1986. As of 2026, there have been 32 novels written in the main series, along with three prequels and a crossover novel with his "Wilderness" series. David Robbins also wrote a 13 novel spin-off to this series called Blade.

The series begins 100 years after World War III, a nuclear war between the United States and the Soviet Union. The series revolves around the predecessors of The Family, a survivalist group living in an isolated compound, called The Home, located in north-western Minnesota and their attempts to venture outside their secure home for the first time since the war. The United States itself was ravaged by nuclear, biological and chemical weapons and has become a dangerous place. Very little is known outside the country. In the novels, the Family's protectors, known as the Warriors, travel to cities and territories, usually dealing with some sort of threat to The Home such as dictators, mutants, etc. The leader of the Warriors, Blade, is the most prominent character.

== Novels ==
1. The Fox Run (1986)
2. Thief River Falls Run (1986)
3. Twin Cities Run (1986)
4. Kalispell Run (1987)
5. Dakota Run (1987)
6. Citadel Run (1987)
7. Armageddon Run (1987)
8. Denver Run (1987)
9. Capital Run (1988)
10. New York Run (1988)
11. Liberty Run (1988)
12. Houston Run (1988)
13. Anaheim Run (1988)
14. Seattle Run (1988)
15. Nevada Run (1989)
16. Miami Run (1989)
17. Atlanta Run (1989)
18. Memphis Run (1989)
19. Cincinnati Run (1989)
20. Dallas Run (1990)
21. Boston Run (1990)
22. Green Bay Run (1990)
23. Yellowstone Run (1990)
24. New Orleans Run (1991)
25. Spartan Run (1991)
26. Madman Run (1991)
27. Chicago Run (1991)
28. Dark Days (2013)
29. Doomsday (2009) (a prequel)
30. A Girl, The End of the World, and Everything 2012 (a prequel)
31. The Lords of Kismet (2015)
32. Synthezoids (2018)
33. Endworld Frontier Strike (2019) (a crossover)
34. A Girl a Dog and Zombies on the Munch (2020) (a prequel)
35. Freedom Run (2021)
36. Tibetan Run (2026)
