= Dynasty (film) =

1976 TV film

- Film poster
- Written by: Sidney Carroll
- Story by: James A. Michener
- Directed by: Lee Philips
- Starring: Harrison Ford; Sarah Miles; Stacy Keach
- Music by: Gil Melle
- Country of origin: United States
- Original language: English

Production
- Executive producer: David Frost
- Producer: Buck Houghton
- Cinematography: William Cronjager
- Editor: George Jay Nicholson
- Running time: 100 minutes
- Production companies: David Paradine Television; Marjay Productions Inc.

Original release
- Network: NBC
- Release: March 13, 1976

Dynasty is a 1976 American Western television film directed by Lee Philips. It stars Harrison Ford, Sarah Miles and Stacy Keach. The film was made during the period before Star Wars in which Ford's career was gaining momentum after his roles in American Graffiti and The Conversation.

== Cast ==
- Harrison Ford as Mark Blackwood
- Sarah Miles as Jennifer Blackwood
- Stacy Keach as Matt Blackwood
- Harris Yulin as John Blackwood
- Amy Irving as Amanda Blackwood
- Granville Van Dusen as Creed Vauclose
- Charles Weldon as Sam Adams
- Gerrit Graham as Carver Blackwood
- Ian Wolfe as Dr. Klauber
