= Marilyn Durham =

American novelist

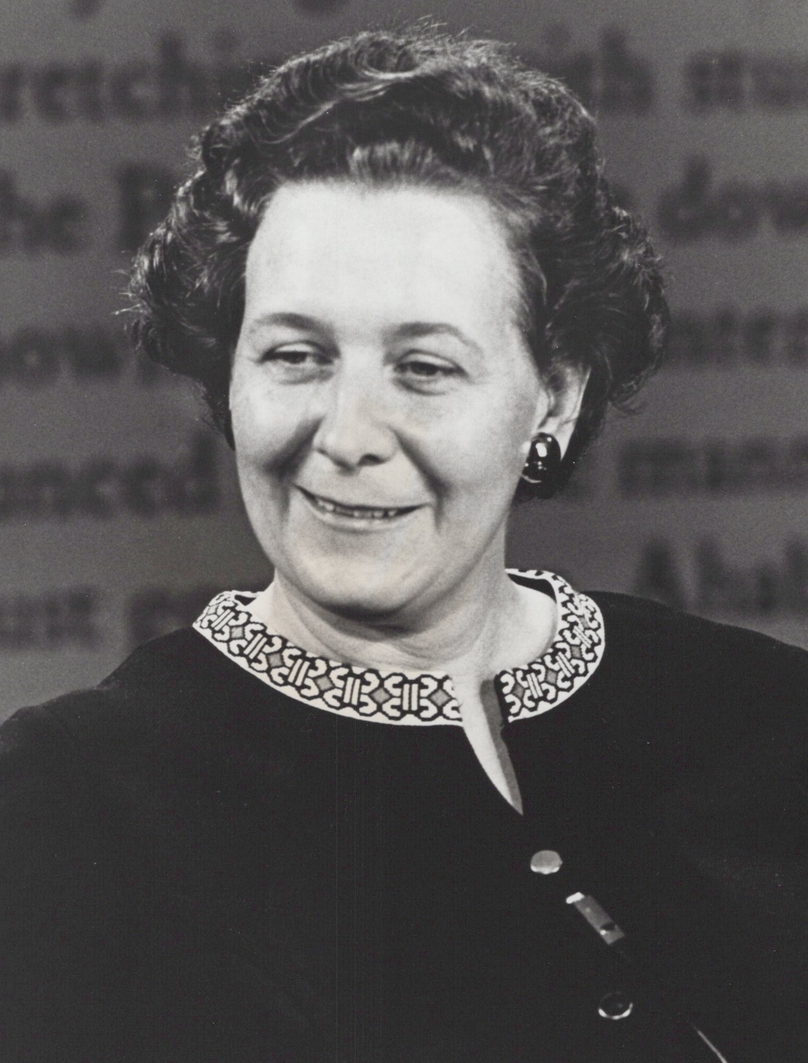
- Durham in 1972
- Born: Marilyn Wall; September 8, 1930; Evansville, Indiana, U.S.
- Died: March 19, 2015 (aged 84); Evansville, Indiana, U.S.
- Occupation: Novelist
- Spouse: Kilburn Durham (1950-1994; his death)
- Children: 2
- Writing career
- Genres: Western, adventure

Marilyn Durham (née Wall, September 8, 1930 – March 19, 2015) was an American author of fiction. Her best-known novel is her first, The Man Who Loved Cat Dancing, which was made into a film of the same name.

== Early life ==
Durham was born in Evansville, Indiana, in 1930, to Russell and Stacy Birdsall Wall. Her father was an L&N blacksmith. Durham attended Evansville College (now called the University of Evansville) for a year (1949–50). She married Kilburn Durham, a field representative for Social Security, in November 1950, and settled into life as a wife and mother and self-described "frumpy housewife." The Durhams had two daughters, Elaine and Jennifer. Durham had a lifelong interest in the history of medieval England, archaeology, theology, and astronomy.

== The Man Who Loved Cat Dancing ==
One evening in 1969, Durham told her husband that she could write a novel better than any she had been reading lately. Eventually she set about doing this. While her daughters were in school, Durham began writing a novel at her dining room table. She made efforts to conceal her writing from her family because, in her words, "If it wasn't any good, I wanted to be the only one who knew. I didn't want egg on my face." Her husband discovered that she was writing when she had almost finished the sixth chapter, and she swore him to secrecy on the subject.

Durham sold The Man Who Loved Cat Dancing to Harcourt Brace, which published it in 1972. The novel is set in the American West and is the story of Jay Grobert, a man of the West, and his offbeat relationship with Catherine Crocker, a woman from the East who is fleeing an unhappy marriage. Jay kidnaps Catherine on his way to rob a train and together they travel through the Wyoming Territory. Catherine eventually discovers that Jay is haunted by the murder of his wife, a Shoshone Indian named Cat Dancing, and his actions after the murder. Pursued by Catherine's husband and a railroad agent, Catherine and Jay fall in love. The novel became a best-seller and was generally praised by reviewers for its deft character studies as well as its effortlessly entertaining style.

The following year, the film version of the novel was released. Directed by Richard C. Sarafian, The Man Who Loved Cat Dancing starred Burt Reynolds and British actress Sarah Miles. It would be Reynolds's first romantic movie. Many who regarded the novel highly were disappointed by its formulaic Hollywood treatment in the movie. Veteran screenwriter Eleanor Perry had written the first script and told Durham that she loved her heroine. The studio then hired a number of "script doctors," who rewrote the characters, dialogue and the ending.

The sentence "Catherine eventually discovers that Jay is haunted" should read "Catherine eventually discovers that Jay is hunted" (hunted, not haunted)

== Dutch Uncle ==
Durham followed up the success of The Man Who Loved Cat Dancing with another character-driven Western novel, Dutch Uncle, which was published by Harcourt in 1973.

Although a bestseller, it was not as great a success as Durham's preceding book. Based on the success of Cat Dancing, the movie rights to the book had been committed before Durham had completed writing it, but the studio ultimately declined to make the film. Several options were taken on it by would-be film makers over the next forty years.

== Flambard's Confession ==
Durham's next book would not be published until 1982, again by Harcourt. Flambard's Confession is a work of historical fiction and a return to her primary intellectual passion: the history of medieval England. Like her previous two books, it was featured as a selection of the Book of the Month Club and was critically praised, but sold less well than her preceding works.

== Later life ==
Durham spoke at writing workshops at the University of Evansville, University of Southern Indiana, and numerous fiction writing groups in Evansville. From 1984 to 1995, she worked as an instructor for McGraw-Hill's Continuing Education Center. In this position, she read and evaluated short fiction and instructed beginning novelists. She also taught Sunday school at Trinity United Methodist Church in downtown Evansville. She was planning a novel about the Spanish King Philip II and his son, Don Carlos, when she suffered a stroke in January 2012. Her novels have seen multiple reprintings and have been translated into many languages.

Her husband, Kilburn, died in 1994. She died on March 19, 2015, aged 84 in her native Evansville.

== Awards ==
Durham won the fiction award of the Society of Midland Authors in 1973 for The Man Who Loved Cat Dancing.

== Bibliography ==
- The Man Who Loved Cat Dancing (1972) ISBN 978-0-440-15246-0
- Dutch Uncle (1973) ISBN 978-0-15-126930-3
- Flambard's Confession (1982) ISBN 978-0-15-131453-9

== Film adaptations ==
- The Man Who Loved Cat Dancing, 1973. Starring Burt Reynolds, Sarah Miles, and Lee J. Cobb. Directed by Richard C. Sarafian.
