= Sarah Miles =

English actress (born 1941)

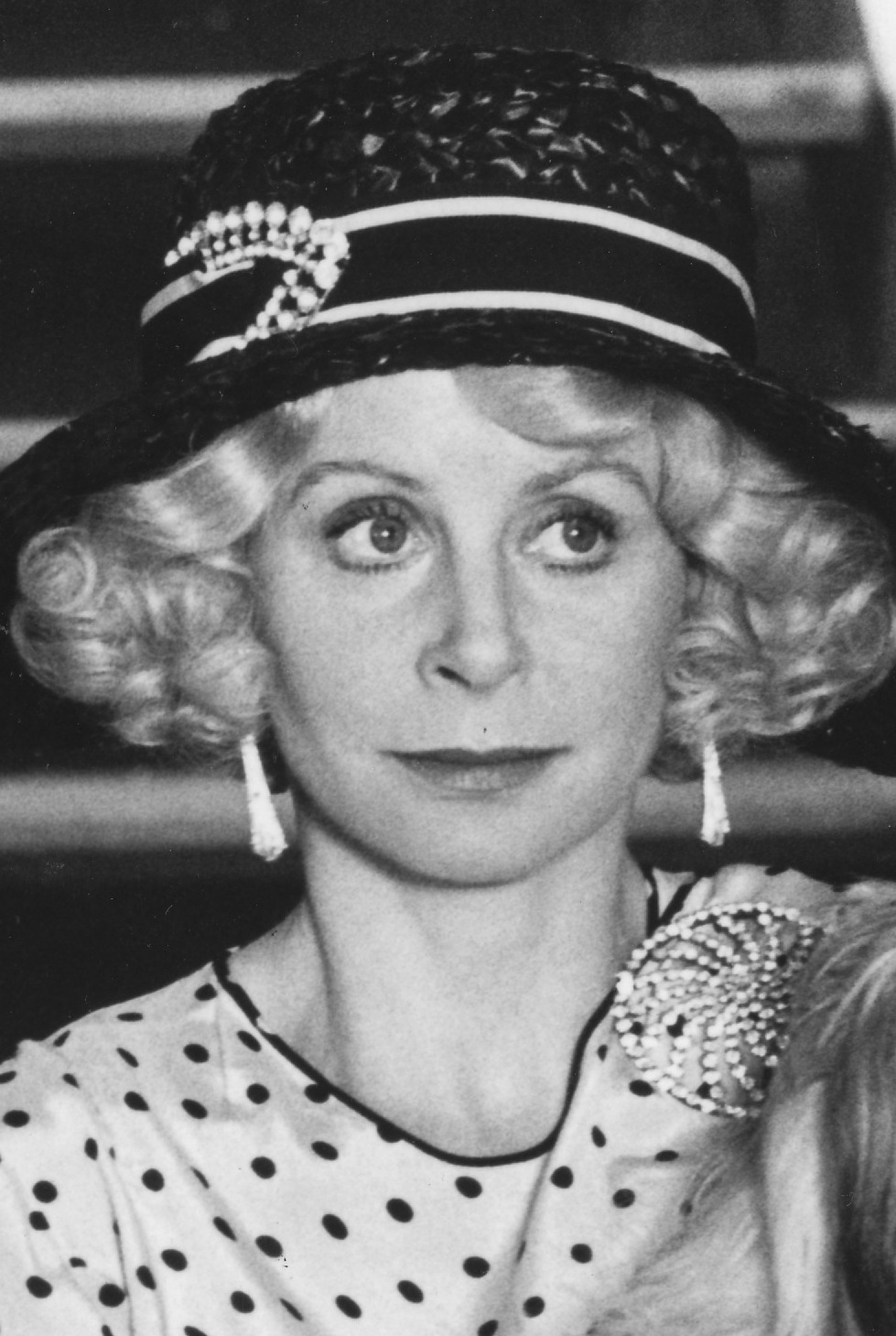
- Miles in 1980
- Born: 31 December 1941 (age 84); Ingatestone, Essex, England
- Occupation: Actress
- Years active: 1961–2004
- Spouses: Robert Bolt (m. 1967; div. 1976) (m. 1988; died 1995)
- Children: 1
- Relatives: Christopher Miles (brother)

Sarah Miles (born 31 December 1941) is a retired English actress. She is known for her roles in films The Servant (1963), Blowup (1966), Ryan's Daughter (1970), The Man Who Loved Cat Dancing (1973), White Mischief (1987), and Hope and Glory (1987). For her performance in Ryan's Daughter, Miles received a nomination for the Academy Award for Best Actress.

== Early life ==
Sarah Miles was born in Ingatestone, Essex, in South East England; her brother was film director, producer, and screenwriter Christopher Miles. Miles's parents were Clarice Vera Remnant and John Miles, of a family of engineers; her father's inability to secure a divorce from his first wife meant Miles and her siblings were illegitimate. Per Miles's own account, her maternal grandfather, Frank Remnant, was the illegitimate son of Prince Francis of Teck (1870–1910), which would make Miles a second cousin, once removed, of Queen Elizabeth II. Unable to speak until the age of nine because of a stammer and dyslexia, she attended Roedean and three other schools, but was expelled from all of them. Miles enrolled at the Royal Academy of Dramatic Art (RADA), graduating in 1960 with an acting diploma.

== Career ==
=== Early career ===
Shortly after finishing at RADA, Miles performed in an episode of the TV series Deadline Midnight titled "Manhunt". Her film debut was as Shirley Taylor, a "husky, wide-eyed nymphet" in Term of Trial (1962), which featured Laurence Olivier; she was nominated for the BAFTA Award for Best Newcomer.

Miles appeared in The Rehearsal (1963) for TV and then played Vera from Manchester in Joseph Losey's The Servant (1963), and in so doing she "thrust sexual appetite into British films" according to David Thomson.

Miles was in a short film directed by her brother, The Six-Sided Triangle (1963), and a feature film directed by and starring Laurence Harvey, The Ceremony (1963). She did Ring Round the Moon (1964) for television.

On 16 June 1965, Ken Annakin's Those Magnificent Men in Their Flying Machines, a British period comedy film revolving around the craze of early aviation circa 1910, was released. A pompous newspaper magnate (Robert Morley) is convinced by his daughter (Miles) and her fiancé (James Fox) to organise an air race from London to Paris. A large sum of money is offered to the winner, and hence it attracts a variety of characters to participate. The film received positive reviews, described as funny, colourful, and clever, capturing the early enthusiasm for aviation.

She was in Time Lost and Time Remembered (1966), directed by Desmond Davis.

In 1966, Miles gained another BAFTA nomination, this time as Best Actress. She had a "peripheral" part in Michelangelo Antonioni's Blowup. At Antonioni's death in 2007, she referred to him as "a rogue and a tyrant and a brilliant man".

=== Robert Bolt ===
After acting in several plays from 1966 to 1969, Miles was cast as Rosy in the leading title role of David Lean's Ryan's Daughter (1970). It was critically savaged, which discouraged Lean from making a film for some years, despite Miles's performance gaining her an Oscar nomination and an Oscar win for John Mills, and the film making a substantial profit. In Terence Pettigrew's biography of Trevor Howard, Miles describes the filming of Ryan's Daughter in Ireland in 1969. She recalls, "My main memory is of sitting on a hilltop in a caravan at six in the morning in the rain. There was no other actor or member of the crew around me. I would sit there getting mad, waiting for either the rain to stop or someone to arrive. Film-acting is so horrifically belittling."

Miles married the film's screenwriter, Robert Bolt. He wrote and directed Lady Caroline Lamb (1972) starring Miles in the title role. She then appeared in The Hireling (1973).

On 11 February 1973, while filming The Man Who Loved Cat Dancing, aspiring screenwriter David Whiting, who was briefly one of her lovers, was found dead in her motel room. She was acquitted of culpability in his death. Miles later commented: "It went on for six months. Murder? Suicide? Murder! Suicide! Murder! Suicide! And, gradually, the truth came out, which I'm not going to speak about, but it certainly wasn't me. I had actually saved the man from three suicide attempts, so why would I want to murder him? I really can't imagine." This led to the end of her first marriage to Bolt.

=== Television ===
Miles starred in some TV movies: Great Expectations (1974), Requiem for a Nun (1975), and Dynasty (1976) as well as the Spanish film Bride to Be (1975).

Her performance as Anne Osborne in The Sailor Who Fell from Grace with the Sea (1976) was nominated for a Golden Globe.

Miles appeared in The Big Sleep (1978), Venom (1981), Walter and June (1983), Ordeal by Innocence (1984), Steaming (1985), Harem (1986) and Queenie (1987).

She received great acclaim for Hope and Glory. Interviewer Lynn Barber wrote of Miles' appearances in Hope and Glory, White Mischief, and her two earliest films that she "has that Vanessa Redgrave quality of seeming to have one skin fewer than normal people, so that the emotion comes over unmuffled and bare."

Filming White Mischief on location in Kenya in 1987, Miles worked for the second and last time with Trevor Howard, who had a supporting role, but was by then seriously ill from alcoholism. The company wanted to fire him, but Miles was determined that Howard's distinguished film career would not end that way. In an interview with Terence Pettigrew for his biography of Howard, she describes how she gave an ultimatum to the executives, threatening to quit the production if they got rid of him. The gamble worked, and Howard was kept on. It was his last major film; he died the following January.

=== Later career ===
She appeared in A Ghost in Monte Carlo (1990), The Silent Touch (1992), Dandelion Dead (1994), Jurij (2001) and The Accidental Detective (2004).

She most recently (2008) appeared in Well at the Trafalgar Studios and the Apollo Theatre opposite Natalie Casey.

== Personal life ==
Miles was married twice to the British playwright Robert Bolt, 1967–1975 and 1988–1995. He wrote and directed the film Lady Caroline Lamb, in which Miles played the eponymous heroine, and also wrote Ryan's Daughter. After his stroke, the couple reunited and Miles cared for him. "I would be dead without her", Bolt said in 1987, "When she's away, my life takes a nosedive. When she returns, my life soars." The couple had a son. Miles stated, in 2007, that she had been drinking her own urine for 30 years for health reasons. In 2016, she reported that she had written a sequel to Ryan's Daughter.

== Filmography ==
Year	Film	Role	Notes
1962	Term of Trial	Shirley Taylor	Nominated – BAFTA Award for Best Newcomer
1963	The Servant	Vera	Nominated – BAFTA Award for Best British Actress
1963	The Ceremony	Catherine	
1965	Those Magnificent Men in Their Flying Machines	Patricia Rawnsley	
1965	I Was Happy Here	Cass Langdon	Also known as Time Lost and Time Remembered
1966	Blowup	Patricia	
1970	Ryan's Daughter	Rosy Ryan	Nominated – Academy Award for Best Actress; Nominated – BAFTA Award for Best Actress in a Leading Role; Nominated – Golden Globe Award for Best Actress – Motion Picture Drama
1972	Lady Caroline Lamb	Lady Caroline Lamb	
1973	The Hireling	Lady Franklin	
1973	The Man Who Loved Cat Dancing	Catherine Crocker	
1974	Great Expectations	Estella	
1975	Bride to Be	Pepita Jiménez	
1975	Requiem for a Nun	Temple Drake	
1976	The Sailor Who Fell from Grace with the Sea	Anne Osborne	Nominated – Golden Globe Award for Best Actress – Motion Picture Drama
1978	The Big Sleep	Charlotte Sternwood	
1981	Priest of Love	Film Star	
1981	Venom	Dr. Marion Stowe	
1984	Ordeal by Innocence	Mary Durant	
1985	Steaming	Sarah	
1986	Harem (mini series)	Lady Ashley	
1987	Hope and Glory	Grace Rowan	Nominated – BAFTA Award for Best Actress in a Leading Role
1987	White Mischief	Alice de Janzé	
1992	The Silent Touch	Helena	
2001	Days of Grace	Sissi, La Madre	
2001	Jurij	Martina, directrice clinica	
2003	The Accidental Detective	Smeralda Mazzi Tinghi	

== Television ==
Year	Title	Role	Notes
1961	Deadline Midnight	Vi Vernon	
1965	Sunday Night At The London Palladium	Herself	
1974	Great Expectations	Estella	
1976	Dynasty	Jennifer Blackwood	
1983	Walter and June	June	
1987	Queenie	Lady Sybil	
1990	A Ghost in Monte Carlo	Emilie/Mme. Bluet	
1994	Dandelion Dead	Catherine Armstrong	TV mini-series
2004	Poirot: The Hollow	Lady Angkatell	

== Books ==
Sarah Miles has written the following books:

- A Right Royal Bastard. Pan Book. 1994. p. 368. ISBN 0-330-33142-6. "1st part of memoirs"
- Serves Me Right. Macmillan. 1994. p. 384. ISBN 0-333-60141-6. "2nd part of memoirs"
- Bolt from the Blue. Phoenix. 1997. p. 272. ISBN 0-7538-0229-5.
- Beautiful Mourning. Orion. 1998. p. 352. ISBN 0-7528-0140-6.

== Other work ==
In 1995, Miles was one of the readers of Edward Lear poems on a specially made spoken word audio CD bringing together a collection of Lear's nonsense songs.

== Awards and nominations ==
Year	Award	Category	Nominated work	Result
1963	BAFTA Awards	Most Promising Newcomer to Leading Film Roles	Term of Trial	Nominated
1964	BAFTA Awards	Best British Actress	The Servant	Nominated
1971	Academy Awards	Best Actress	Ryan's Daughter	Nominated
1971	BAFTA Awards	Best Actress	Ryan's Daughter	Nominated
1971	Golden Globe Awards	Best Actress in a Motion Picture - Drama	Ryan's Daughter	Nominated
1971	Laurel Awards	Best Dramatic Performance, Female	Ryan's Daughter	Nominated
1973	Cannes Film Festival	Special Award	The Hireling	Won
1977	Golden Globe Awards	Best Actress in a Motion Picture - Drama	The Sailor Who Fell from Grace with the Sea	Nominated
1988	BAFTA Awards	Best Actress	Hope and Glory	Nominated

== See also ==
- List of Academy Award winners and nominees from Great Britain
- List of actors with Academy Award nominations
- List of actors who have appeared in multiple Palme d'Or winners
