= Flambard's Confession =

Flambard's Confession is a historical novel written by the American author Marilyn Durham. Published in 1982 by Harcourt, the novel marked a return to Durham's primary intellectual passion, the history of Medieval England, after her two previous novels which were set in the American Old West.

Flambard, an historical figure and protagonist of the novel, is a priest and functionary of both William the Conqueror and William Rufus, the first two Norman kings of England. Durham tells his story as a deathbed confession, full of the court intrigue of the times and colorful descriptions of early 12th century life in England.

Like her previous two books, Flambard's Confession was featured as a selection of the Book of the Month Club, and was critically praised. However, it sold less well than her preceding works. Flambard’s Confession was Durham's last novel.
