= The Man Who Loved Cat Dancing =

1972 novel written by Marilyn Durham

- First edition
- Author: Marilyn Durham
- Language: English
- Genre: Novel
- Publisher: Harcourt, Brace, Jovanovich
- Publication date: 1972
- Publication place: United States
- Media type: Print (hardback & paperback)
- Pages: 246 p. (hardcover edition)
- OCLC: 323879

The Man Who Loved Cat Dancing is a novel written by Marilyn Durham first published in 1972.

== Plot ==
The novel is set in the American West in the 1880s, but is not written in a genre style. It is the story of Jay, a man of the West, and his offbeat relationship with Catherine, a woman from the East who is fleeing an unhappy marriage. Jay kidnaps Catherine on his way to rob a train and together they travel through the Wyoming Territory. Catherine eventually discovers that Jay is haunted by the murder of his wife, a Shoshone Indian named Cat Dancing, and his actions after the murder. Pursued by Catherine's husband and a railroad agent, Catherine and Jay fall in love.

== Reception ==
The novel, Durham's first, became a best seller, and was generally praised by reviewers for its deft character studies as well as its effortlessly entertaining style.

== Adaptation ==
In 1973, the film version of the novel was released. Directed by Richard C. Sarafian and produced by Martin Poll, The Man Who Loved Cat Dancing starred Burt Reynolds and British actress Sarah Miles. It would be Reynolds' first romantic movie. Many who regarded the novel highly were disappointed by its formulaic Hollywood treatment in the movie.

== Notes ==
- Corrigan, Sara Ann. "'Housewife Durham found Fame Writing Her Debut Novel." The Evansville Press, August 5, 1987
- Gale Reference Team. Biography - Durham, Marilyn (1930-), Contemporary Authors (Biography), 2002, Thomson Gale.
- Lewis, Barbara. "Burt Reynolds: Hollywood's New Sex God." Liberty Magazine, Summer 1973.
