= John Edward Ames =

American writer

- Born: December 30, 1949 (age 76)
- Writing career
- Genres: Westerns, horror, historical fiction

John Edward Ames (born December 30, 1949) is an American writer of novels and short stories from Toledo, Ohio. A critically acclaimed writer of western fiction, Ames began his career writing for pulp magazines before penning horror novels and stories. In 1995, Ames' historical novel The Unwritten Order was a finalist for a Western Writers of America Spur Award.

== Biography ==
Raised in Monroe County, Michigan, and educated at Eastern Michigan University, Ames lived in Colorado and New Mexico before settling in 1986 in New Orleans, Louisiana. Before becoming a full-time writer, Ames taught English at Eastern Michigan University, the University of Northern Colorado and the University of New Mexico. He enlisted in the Marine Corps in 1968 and served as a journalist, including seven months as a stringer in Japan for Stars and Stripes.

In 2004 Ames wrote The Real Deadwood, a mix of history and buff lore about Wild Bill Hickok and Calamity Jane. Writing under the pseudonym Judd Cole, Ames wrote the entire twenty-three book Cheyenne series. Under the same pen name he penned the eight-book Wild Bill series.

Ames fled with most fellow residents of New Orleans when Hurricane Katrina came ashore in 2005, but looming book deadlines forced him to return as soon as possible to his apartment on St. Charles Avenue, where he spent the next six months writing three novels. He contributed to Ellery Queen Mystery Magazine New Orleans Relief Issue.

He presently writes under a “house name” for one of the longest-published western series in America and has also written a novel, titled Deadwood Gulch, released in 2006, as Ralph Compton, the deceased "USA Today bestseller of frontier fiction" writer.

== Works ==
=== Novels ===
- The Force
- Death Crystal
- Spellcaster
- The Asylum
- The Unwritten Order
- The Golden Circle
- Soldier's Heart

=== The Cheyenne series (as Judd Cole) ===
- Arrow Keeper
- Death Chant
- Renegade Justice
- Vision Quest
- Blood on the Plains
- Comanche Raid
- Comancheros
- War Party
- Pathfinder
- Buffalo Hiders
- Spirit Path
- Mankiller
- Wendigo Mountain
- Death Camp
- Renegade Nation
- Orphan Train
- Vengeance Quest
- Warrior Fury
- Bloody Bones Canyon
- Renegade Siege
- River of Death

=== The Wild Bill series (as Judd Cole) ===
- 1 Dead Man's Hand
- 2 The Kincaid County War
- 3 Bleeding Kansas
- 4 Yuma Bustout
- 5 Santa Fe Deathtrap
- 6 Black Hills Hellhole
- 7 Point Rider
- 8 Gun Law

=== Dan’l Boone: The Lost Wilderness Tales (last seven books as Dodge Tyler) ===
- The Long Hunters
- Warrior's Trace
- The Kaintucks

=== Non-fiction ===
- The Real Deadwood
- Elfrieda Abbe, ed. (2004). "Writing Historical Fiction". Writers Handbook. Watson-Guptill. ISBN 978-0-87116-212-0.

=== Magazines ===
In addition to fifty-six book sales and six ghostwritten novels, Ames’ has written short stories and articles for magazines:

- Alfred Hitchcock Mystery Magazine
- Ellery Queen Mystery Magazine
- The Writer
- The Borderland Series
- Mystery Scene
- Colorado-North Review
