= Martin Poll =

American film producer

- Born: November 24, 1922; New York City, U.S.
- Died: April 14, 2012 (aged 89); New York City, U.S.
- Occupation: Producer
- Children: 3, including Jon Poll

Martin Poll (November 24, 1922 – April 14, 2012) was an American film and television producer. Poll produced eleven feature films during his career, including The Lion in Winter, for which he received a 1968 Academy Award nomination for Academy Award for Best Picture. The Lion in Winter, which starred Katharine Hepburn and Peter O'Toole, received nine nominations and won three Academy Awards. It also won a Golden Globe Award for Best Motion Picture – Drama.

== Life ==
Poll was born on November 24, 1922, in New York City. Poll launched his production career in 1954, when he produced thirty-nine episodes of the television series Flash Gordon, for distribution in West Germany and France.

Poll purchased and restored the Biograph Studios, a studio facility and film laboratory complex in the Bronx, during the 1950s. He reopened the studios in 1956 under a new name, Gold Medal Studios. The reopening made the Bronx-based facility the largest film studio in the United States located outside of Los Angeles at the time. Poll helped create numerous films at Gold Medal Studios, including A Face in the Crowd in 1957, The Goddess in 1958, The Fugitive Kind in 1959, Middle of the Night in 1959, and BUtterfield 8 in 1960. Poll was appointed the Commissioner of Motion Picture Arts of New York City in 1959 for his work with Gold Medal Studios. The New York City government soon established its own film commission shortly after Poll's appointment. Poll sold Gold Medal Studios during the early 1960s to focus on film production.

In addition to his body of film work, Poll also produced television series, films, and specials as well. His credits included The Dain Curse, a 1978 CBS television miniseries; The Fantastic Seven, a 1979 CBS television movie; and Diana: Her True Story, a TV film which aired on NBC in 1993 based on a book by Andrew Morton.

Poll earned an Emmy nomination for executive producing a remake of The Lion in Winter, starring Glenn Close as Eleanor of Aquitaine, which aired on Showtime in 2003.

Martin Poll died in New York City on April 14, 2012, at the age of 89. He was survived by his wife, Gladys Poll; three sons – Mark Poll, Tony Jaffe, and Jon Poll, a film editor and film director; and three grandchildren.

== Cast of Characters Lawsuit (2003) ==
In 2003, Cohen, together with production partner Martin Poll, was at the center of a lawsuit against 20th Century Fox, claiming the company had intentionally plagiarized a script of theirs titled Cast of Characters in order to create the Sean Connery-starring League of Extraordinary Gentlemen film in 2003. According to the BBC, the lawsuit alleged 'that Mr Cohen and Mr Poll pitched the idea to Fox several times between 1993 and 1996, under the name Cast of Characters.' The League of Extraordinary Gentlemen was an adaptation of the 1999 comic book series published by Alan Moore and artist Kevin O'Neill.

== Film production credits ==
Poll produced eleven studio films. His credits included two films loosely based on Russian and Japanese novels: Love and Death (as executive producer), which was based on a Russian novel and directed by Woody Allen in 1975, and The Sailor Who Fell from Grace with the Sea in 1976, which was based on a Yukio Mishima novel.

=== Film ===
Year	Title	Credit	Notes
1957	The Big Fun Carnival	Executive producer	
1963	Love Is a Ball		
1965	Sylvia		
1968	The Lion in Winter		
1969	The Appointment		
1970	The Magic Garden of Stanley Sweetheart		
1972	The Possession of Joel Delaney		
1973	The Man Who Loved Cat Dancing		
1973	Night Watch		
1975	Love and Death	Executive producer	
1976	The Sailor Who Fell from Grace with the Sea		
1978	Somebody Killed Her Husband		
1981	Nighthawks		
1984	Gimme an 'F'	Executive producer	
1988	Haunted Summer		
1991	My Heroes Have Always Been Cowboys		Final film as a producer

=== Television ===
Year	Title	Credit	Notes
1959	New York Confidential		
1960	The Comedy Spot		
1978	The Dain Curse		
1979	The Fantastic Seven		Television film
1983	Merlin and the Sword		Television film
1993	Diana: Her True Story	Executive producer	Television film
2003	The Lion in Winter	Executive producer	Television film
