= Robert J. Randisi =

American author (born 1951)

Robert Joseph Randisi
- Born: August 24, 1951; Brooklyn, New York
- Died: October 6, 2024 (aged 73)
- Occupation: Novelist
- Writing career
- Pen name: J. R. Roberts
- Genres: Detective fiction, Western fiction
- Notable works: The Gunsmith series; The Rat Pack series
- Notable awards: Lifetime Achievement from The Private Eye Writers of America; Lifetime Achievement from Western Fictioneers; Lifetime Achievement from The Short Mystery Fiction Society; John Seigenthaler Humanitarian Award from Killer Nashville; Lifetime Achievement Award from the Southwest Mystery Convention

Robert Joseph Randisi (August 24, 1951 - October 6, 2024) was an American author, editor and screenwriter who wrote in the detective and Western genres.

== Biography ==
Randisi authored more than 650 published books and edited more than 30 anthologies of short stories. Booklist magazine said he "may be the last of the pulp writers." For more than three decades starting around January 1982, he had at least one book published every month. In 1984 he wrote 27 books in 12 months.

He co-founded and edited Mystery Scene magazine and co-founded the American Crime Writers League. He founded The Private Eye Writers of America in 1981, where he created the Shamus Award. He co-founded The American Crime Writers League; co-founded Western Fictioneers, and co-created The Peacemaker award.

He co-wrote several mystery novels with soap opera actress Eileen Davidson: Death in Daytime (2008), Dial Emmy for Murder (2009), Diva Las Vegas (2010), and Swinging in the Rain (2011). He collaborated with actor, and poker commentator Vince Van Patten on "The Picasso Flop" and 'The Judgment Fold."

Notable characters appearing in some of his novels include "Miles Jacoby", "Joe Keough", "Nick Delvecchio", "Gil and Claire Hunt", "Truxton Lewis", "Eddie G." and The Rat Pack. As J. R. Roberts, he wrote over 500 adult westerns featuring his character "Clint Adams - The Gunsmith".
