= Alex Awards =

American young adult book award

Alex Award
- Awarded for: Adults books with "special appeal" for adolescents
- Country: United States
- Presented by: Young Adult Library Services Association, a division of the American Library Association
- First award: 1998
- Website: ala.org/yalsa/alex-awards

The Alex Awards annually recognize "ten books written for adults that have special appeal to young adults ages 12 through 18". Since 2002, the Alex Awards have been administered by the Young Adult Library Services Association, a division of the American Library Association.

The awards, initially bestowed in 1998, were named after Baltimore librarian Margaret Alexander Edwards, who was known as "Alex". They are sponsored by the Margaret Alexander Edwards Trust and Booklist magazine. Books published during the previous year are eligible for the awards.

== Alex recipients ==
Alex Awards, 1998 to present
Year	Author	Title
1998	David Bodanis	The Secret Family: Twenty-four Hours Inside the Mysterious Worlds of Our Minds and Bodies
1998	Rick Bragg	All Over but the Shoutin'
1998	Rebecca Carroll	Sugar in the Raw: Voices of Young Black Girls in America
1998	Karin Cook	What Girls Learn
1998	Pete Hamill	Snow in August
1998	Sebastian Junger	The Perfect Storm: A True Story of Men Against the Sea
1998	Jon Krakauer	Into Thin Air: A Personal Account of the Mt. Everest Disaster
1998	Velma Maia Thomas	Lest We Forget: The Passage from Africa to Slavery and Emancipation
1998	Dawn Turner Trice	Only Twice I've Wished for Heaven
1998	Connie Willis	To Say Nothing of the Dog; or, How We Found the Bishop's Bird Stump at Last
1999	Caroline Alexander	The Endurance: Shackleton's Legendary Antarctic Expedition
1999	James Finney Boylan	Getting In
1999	Andie Dominick	Needles
1999	John Gilstrap	At All Costs
1999	Jesse Lee Kercheval	Space
1999	Steve Kluger	Last Days of Summer
1999	Robert Silverberg	Legends: Short Novels by the Masters of Modern Fantasy
1999	Kim Stanley Robinson	Antarctica
1999	Esmeralda Santiago	Almost a Woman
1999	Danzy Senna	Caucasia
2000	David Breashears	High Exposure: An Enduring Passion for Everest and Unforgiving Places
2000	Orson Scott Card	Ender's Shadow
2000	Breena Clarke	River, Cross My Heart
2000	Esmé Raji Codell	Educating Esmé: Diary of a Teacher's First Year
2000	Jonathon Scott Fuqua	The Reappearance of Sam Webber
2000	Neil Gaiman	Stardust
2000	Linda Greenlaw	The Hungry Ocean: A Swordboat Captain's Journey
2000	Elva Trevino Hart	Barefoot Heart: Stories of a Migrant Child
2000	Kent Haruf	Plainsong
2000	Connie Porter	Imani All Mine
2001	Darin Strauss	Chang & Eng
2001	Larry Colton	Counting Coup
2001	Juliet Marillier	Daughter of the Forest
2001	Alan Watt	Diamond Dogs
2001	James Bradley and Ron Powers	Flags of Our Fathers
2001	Tracy Chevalier	Girl with a Pearl Earring
2001	Nathaniel Philbrick	In the Heart of the Sea: The Tragedy of the Whaleship Essex
2001	Ben Sherwood	The Man Who Ate the 747
2001	Gillian Bradshaw	The Sand Reckoner
2001	June Jordan	Soldier: A Poet's Childhood
2002	Geraldine Brooks	Year of Wonders: A Novel of the Plague
2002	William Doyle	An American Insurrection: The Battle of Oxford, Mississippi
2002	David Anthony Durham	Gabriel's Story
2002	Barbara Ehrenreich	Nickel and Dimed: On (Not) Getting by in Boom-Time America
2002	Leif Enger	Peace Like a River
2002	Kobie Kruger	The Wilderness Family: At Home with Africa's Wildlife
2002	Donna Morrissey	Kit's Law
2002	Mel Odom	The Rover
2002	Vineeta Vijayaraghavan	Motherland
2002	Rebecca Walker	Black, White, and Jewish: Autobiography of a Shifting Self
2003	Lynda Barry	One! Hundred! Demons!
2003	Pat Conroy	My Losing Season
2003	Timothy Ferris	Seeing in the Dark: How Backyard Stargazers Are Probing Deep Space and Guarding Earth from Interplanetary Peril
2003	Jasper Fforde	The Eyre Affair
2003	Mary Lawson	Crow Lake
2003	Brian Malloy	The Year of Ice
2003	Julie Otsuka	When the Emperor Was Divine
2003	Ann Packer	The Dive from Clausen's Pier
2003	Martha Southgate	The Fall of Rome
2003	Joseph Weisberg	10th Grade
2004	Amanda Davis	Wonder When You'll Miss Me
2004	Mark Haddon	The Curious Incident of the Dog in the Night-Time
2004	Khaled Hosseini	The Kite Runner
2004	Audrey Niffenegger	The Time Traveler's Wife
2004	ZZ Packer	Drinking Coffee Elsewhere
2004	Mary Roach	Stiff
2004	Mark Salzman	True Notebooks
2004	Marjane Satrapi	Persepolis
2004	Jacqueline Winspear	Maisie Dobbs
2004	Bart Yates	Leave Myself Behind
2005	Steve Almond	Candyfreak: A Journey Through the Chocolate Underbelly of America
2005	Lynne Cox	Swimming to Antarctica: Tales of a Long-Distance Swimmer
2005	Brendan Halpin	Donorboy
2005	Robert Kurson	Shadow Divers
2005	Kent Meyers	Work of Wolves
2005	Ann Patchett	Truth & Beauty: A Friendship
2005	Jodi Picoult	My Sister's Keeper
2005	Kit Reed	Thinner Than Thou
2005	Jim Shepard	Project X
2005	Robert Sullivan	Rats: Observations on the History and Habitat of the City's Most Unwanted Inhabitants
2006	Judy Fong Bates	Midnight at the Dragon Café
2006	Kalisha Buckhanon	Upstate
2006	Neil Gaiman	Anansi Boys
2006	Gregory Galloway	As Simple as Snow
2006	Kazuo Ishiguro	Never Let Me Go
2006	A. Lee Martinez	Gil's All Fright Diner
2006	Susan Palwick	The Necessary Beggar
2006	Nancy Rawles	My Jim
2006	Julia Scheeres	Jesus Land: A Memoir
2006	Jeannette Walls	The Glass Castle: A Memoir
2007	John Connolly	The Book of Lost Things
2007	Ivan Doig	The Whistling Season
2007	Michael D'Orso	Eagle Blue: A Team, a Tribe, and a High School Basketball Season in Arctic Alaska
2007	Sara Gruen	Water for Elephants
2007	Pamela Carter Joern	Floor of the Sky
2007	John Hamamura	Color of the Sea
2007	Michael Lewis	The Blind Side: Evolution of a Game
2007	David Mitchell	Black Swan Green
2007	Ron Rash	The World Made Straight
2007	Diane Setterfield	The Thirteenth Tale
2008	Matthew Polly	American Shaolin: Flying Kicks, Buddhist Monks, and the Legend of Iron Crotch: An Odyssey in the New China
2008	Matt Ruff	Bad Monkeys
2008	Jeff Lemire	Essex County Volume 1: Tales from the Farm
2008	Conn Iggulden	Genghis: Birth of an Empire
2008	Aryn Kyle	The God of Animals
2008	Ishmael Beah	A Long Way Gone: Memoirs of a Boy Soldier
2008	Lloyd Jones	Mister Pip
2008	Patrick Rothfuss	The Name of the Wind
2008	Thomas Maltman	The Night Birds
2008	Lisa Lutz	The Spellman Files
2009	David Benioff	City of Thieves
2009	Michael Swanwick	The Dragons of Babel
2009	Zoë Ferraris	Finding Nouf
2009	Hannah Tinti	The Good Thief
2009	Stephen King	Just After Sunset: Stories
2009	Hillary Jordan	Mudbound
2009	Todd Tucker	Over and Under
2009	Stephen G. Bloom	The Oxford Project
2009	Toby Barlow	Sharp Teeth
2009	Theresa Rebeck	Three Girls and Their Brother
2010	William Kamkwamba and Bryan Mealer	The Boy Who Harnessed the Wind: Creating Currents of Electricity and Hope
2010	Meg Rosoff	The Bride's Farewell
2010	Ron Currie Jr.	Everything Matters!
2010	David Finkel	The Good Soldiers
2010	Diana Welch and Liz Welch	The Kids Are All Right: A Memoir
2010	Lev Grossman	The Magicians
2010	Peter Rock	My Abandonment
2010	Gail Carriger	Soulless: An Alexia Tarabotti Novel
2010	David Small	Stitches: A Memoir
2010	Kevin Wilson	Tunneling to the Center of the Earth
2011	DC Pierson	The Boy Who Couldn't Sleep and Never Had To
2011	Liz Murray	Breaking Night: A Memoir of Forgiveness, Survival, and My Journey from Homeless to Harvard
2011	Jean Kwok	Girl in Translation
2011	Peter Bognanni	The House of Tomorrow
2011	Steve Hamilton	The Lock Artist
2011	Aimee Bender	The Particular Sadness of Lemon Cake
2011	Matt Haig	The Radleys
2011	Alden Bell	The Reapers Are the Angels
2011	Emma Donoghue	Room
2011	Helen Grant	The Vanishing of Katharina Linden
2012	Rachel DeWoskin	Big Girl Small
2012	Jo Ann Beard	In Zanesville
2012	David Levithan	The Lover's Dictionary
2012	Brooke Hauser	The New Kids: Big Dreams and Brave Journeys at a High School for Immigrant Teens
2012	Erin Morgenstern	The Night Circus
2012	Ernest Cline	Ready Player One
2012	Daniel H. Wilson	Robopocalypse
2012	Jesmyn Ward	Salvage the Bones
2012	Caroline Preston	The Scrapbook of Frankie Pratt: A Novel in Pictures
2012	Roland Merullo	The Talk-Funny Girl
2013	David Zimmerman	Caring Is Creepy
2013	Tupelo Hassman	Girlchild
2013	Richard Ross	Juvenile in Justice
2013	Robin Sloan	Mr. Penumbra's 24-Hour Bookstore
2013	Derf Backderf	My Friend Dahmer
2013	Chris Ballard	One Shot at Forever
2013	Julianna Baggott	Pure
2013	Louise Erdrich	The Round House
2013	Carol Rifka Brunt	Tell the Wolves I'm Home
2013	Maria Semple	Where'd You Go, Bernadette?
2014	Mark Slouka	Brewster
2014	Lisa O'Donnell	The Death of Bees
2014	Abigail Tarttelin	Golden Boy
2014	John Searles	Help for the Haunted
2014	Max Barry	Lexicon
2014	Wesley Chu	Lives of Tao
2014	Koren Zailckas	Mother, Mother
2014	Lucy Knisley	Relish: My Life in the Kitchen
2014	Katja Millay	The Sea of Tranquility
2014	Gavin Extence	The Universe Versus Alex Woods
2015	Anthony Doerr	All the Light We Cannot See
2015	Kate Racculia	Bellweather Rhapsody
2015	James A. Levine	Bingo's Run
2015	Kanae Minato	Confessions
2015	Celeste Ng	Everything I Never Told You
2015	John Scalzi	Lock In
2015	Andy Weir	The Martian
2015	Zak Ebrahim	The Terrorist's Son: A Story of Choice
2015	Michael Koryta	Those Who Wish Me Dead
2015	John Darnielle	Wolf in White Van
2016	Ryan Gattis	All Involved
2016	Ta-Nehisi Coates	Between the World and Me
2016	Camille DeAngelis	Bones & All
2016	David Wong	Futuristic Violence and Fancy Suits
2016	Sara Nović	Girl at War
2016	Joe Abercrombie	Half the World
2016	Brandon Stanton	Humans of New York: Stories
2016	Liz Suburbia	Sacred Heart
2016	Dan-el Padilla Peralta	Undocumented: A Dominican Boy's Odyssey from a Homeless Shelter to the Ivy League
2016	Keija Parssinen	The Unraveling of Mercy Louis
2017	Sarah Beth Durst	The Queen of Blood
2017	Manuel Gonzales	The Regional Office Is Under Attack!
2017	Diane Guerrero with Michelle Burford	In the Country We Love: My Family Divided
2017	Hannah Hart	Buffering: Unshared Tales of a Life Fully Loaded
2017	Holly Jennings	Arena
2017	Seanan McGuire	Every Heart a Doorway
2017	Ryan North	Romeo and/or Juliet: A Choosable-Path Adventure
2017	Rob Rufus	Die Young with Me: A Memoir
2017	Matt Simon	The Wasp that Brainwashed the Caterpillar
2017	Scott Stambach	The Invisible Life of Ivan Isaenko
2018	Martha Wells	All Systems Red
2018	Daniel H. Wilson	The Clockwork Dynasty
2018	Seanan McGuire	Down Among the Sticks and Bones
2018	Eve Ewing	Electric Arches
2018	Melissa Fleming	A Hope More Powerful than the Sea
2018	Joey Comeau	Malagash
2018	Jeff Lemire	Roughneck
2018	Jordan Harper	She Rides Shotgun
2018	Tasha Kavanagh	Things We Have in Common
2018	Kat Howard	An Unkindness of Magicians
2019	P. Djèlí Clark	The Black God's Drums
2019	Meghan MacLean Weir	The Book of Essie
2019	Madeline Miller	Circe
2019	Tara Westover	Educated: A Memoir
2019	Clemantine Wamariya and Elizabeth Weil	The Girl Who Smiled Beads: A Story of War and What Comes After
2019	Sam Graham-Felsen	Green
2019	David Small	Home After Dark
2019	N. K. Jemisin	How Long 'til Black Future Month?
2019	Jonathan Evison	Lawn Boy
2019	Naomi Novik	Spinning Silver
2020	C.A. Fletcher	A Boy and His Dog at the End of the World
2020	Temi Oh	Do You Dream of Terra-Two?
2020	Angie Cruz	Dominicana
2020	Maia Kobabe	Gender Queer: A Memoir
2020	Tegan and Sara	High School
2020	AJ Dungo	In Waves
2020	Seanan McGuire	Middlegame
2020	Colson Whitehead	The Nickel Boys
2020	Casey McQuiston	Red, White & Royal Blue
2020	Lisa Lutz	The Swallows
2021	Rebecca Roanhorse	Black Sun
2021	TJ Klune	The House in the Cerulean Sea
2021	Colin O'Brady	The Impossible First: From Fire to Ice - Crossing Antarctica Alone
2021	Derf Backderf	Kent State: Four Dead in Ohio
2021	Gretchen Anthony	The Kids Are Gonna Ask
2021	Stephen Graham Jones	The Only Good Indians
2021	Emily M. Danforth	Plain Bad Heroines
2021	Tochi Onyebuchi	Riot Baby
2021	Allie Brosh	Solutions and Other Problems
2021	Quan Barry	We Ride Upon Sticks: A Novel
2022	Ryka Aoki	Light from Uncommon Stars
2022	Marianne Cronin	The One Hundred Years of Lenni and Margot
2022	Genevieve Gornichec	The Witch's Heart
2022	T. L. Huchu	The Library of the Dead
2022	Will Leitch	How Lucky
2022	Everina Maxwell	Winter's Orbit
2022	Kate Quinn	The Rose Code
2022	Kareem Rosser	Crossing the Line: A Fearless Team of Brothers and the Sport That Changed Their Lives Forever
2022	Rachel Smythe	Lore Olympus, Vol. 1
2022	Heather Walter	Malice
2023	Sophie Irwin	A Lady's Guide to Fortune-Hunting
2023	R. F. Kuang	Babel, or the Necessity of Violence: An Arcane History of the Oxford Translators' Revolution
2023	Jennette McCurdy	I'm Glad My Mom Died
2023	Jarrett Melendez, illus. by Danica Brine	Chef's Kiss
2023	Sara Nović	True Biz
2023	Jamila Rowser, illus. by Robyn Smith	Wash Day Diaries
2023	John Scalzi	The Kaiju Preservation Society
2023	James Spooner	The High Desert: Black. Punk. Nowhere.
2023	Sue Lynn Tan	Daughter of the Moon Goddess
2023	Javier Zamora	Solito: A Memoir
2024	Nana Kwame Adjei-Brenyah	Chain-Gang All-Stars
2024	Darrin Bell	The Talk
2024	Jessica George	Maame
2024	Jessica Johns	Bad Cree
2024	Khashayar J. Khabushani	I Will Greet the Sun Again
2024	Daniel Kraus	Whalefall
2024	Oksana Masters	The Hard Parts: A Memoir of Courage and Triumph
2024	John Scalzi	Starter Villain
2024	Jade Song	Chlorine
2024	Rebecca Yarros	Fourth Wing
2025	Melissa Blake	Beautiful People: My Thirteen Truths About Disability
2025	David F. Walker, illus. by Marcus Kwame Anderson	Big Jim and the White Boy: An American Classic Reimagined
2025	Eve J. Chung	Daughters of Shandong
2025	P. Djèlí Clark	The Dead Cat Tail Assassins
2025	Kristen Perrin	How to Solve Your Own Murder
2025	Lara Pickle	I Feel Awful, Thanks
2025	Stephen Graham Jones	I Was a Teenage Slasher
2025	Rosie Hewlett	The Witch of Colchis
2025	Henry H. Neff	The Witchstone
2025	Marjane Satrapi, trans. by Una Dimitrijević	Woman, Life, Freedom
2026	Layne Fargo	The Favorites
2026	Leila Mottley	The Girls Who Grew Big
2026	Bob the Drag Queen	Harriet Tubman: Live in Concert
2026	Daniel H. Wilson	Hole in the Sky
2026	Peter Kuper	Insectopolis: A Natural History
2026	Andy Anderegg	Plum
2026	Sonita Alizada	Sonita: My Fight Against Tyranny and My Escape to Freedom
2026	Mia McKenzie	These Heathens
2026	Janelle Brown	What Kind of Paradise
2026	Travis Kennedy	The Whyte Python World Tour
