= Aimee Bender =

American novelist and short story writer

- Born: June 28, 1969 (age 57); United States
- Education: University of California, San Diego; University of California, Irvine (MFA)
- Occupations: Author, writer
- Writing career
- Genres: Literary fiction Magical realism Slipstream

Aimee Bender (born June 28, 1969) is an American novelist and short story writer, known for her surreal stories and characters. She is a 2011 recipient of the Alex Awards.

== Biography ==
Born to a Jewish family, Bender received her undergraduate degree from the University of California at San Diego, and a Master of Fine Arts from the creative writing MFA program at University of California at Irvine. While at UCI she studied with Judith Grossman and Geoffrey Wolff. She received ArtsBridge scholarships and worked with mentor Keith Fowler to create writing programs for K-12 students in Orange County, California. She currently teaches creative writing at the University of Southern California where she served as Director of the USC PhD in Creative Writing & Literature from 2012 to 2015. In the past, she taught a class in surrealist writing at the UCLA Extension Writers' Program and was a senior artist at the non-profit theater workshop The Imagination Workshop, helping mentally ill and at-risk individuals write, direct and act in their own theatrical creations. She has named Oscar Wilde, Hans Christian Andersen, the Brothers Grimm and Anne Sexton as influences on her writing. A native of Los Angeles, Bender is a close friend of fellow UCI alumna Alice Sebold. Her sister is novelist and short story writer Karen Bender.

Her first book was The Girl in the Flammable Skirt, a collection of short stories, published in 1998. The book was chosen as a New York Times Notable Book of 1998 and spent seven weeks on the Los Angeles Times bestseller list. Her novel An Invisible Sign of My Own was published in 2000, and was named as a Los Angeles Times Pick of the Year. In 2005, she published another collection of short stories, Willful Creatures, which was nominated by The Believer magazine – owned by McSweeney's — as one of the Best Books of the Year. Her novella The Third Elevator was published in 2009 by Madras Press. Her novel The Particular Sadness of Lemon Cake was published in 2010 by Doubleday.

Bender has received two Pushcart Prizes, and was nominated for the James Tiptree, Jr. Award in 2005. Her short story Faces was a 2009 Shirley Jackson Award finalist. In 2009, Bender became the sitting judge for the Flatmancrooked Writing Prize, a writing award from Flatmancrooked Publishing for new short fiction.

Bender's works have also been published in Granta, GQ, Harper's Magazine, Tin House, Opium Magazine, McSweeney's, The Paris Review, The Coffin Factory, Ploughshares, and several anthologies. She has also been heard on This American Life and Selected Shorts.

== Bibliography ==
- —— (1998). The Girl in the Flammable Skirt. Knopf. ISBN 9780385492164.
- —— (2001). An Invisible Sign of My Own. Knopf. ISBN 9780385492249.
- —— (2005). Willful Creatures. Knopf. ISBN 9780385720977.
- —— (2009). The Third Elevator. Catapult. ISBN 9780982525401.
- —— (2010). The Particular Sadness of Lemon Cake. Knopf. ISBN 9780385501125.
- —— (2013). The Color Master. Knopf. ISBN 9780385534895.
- —— (2020). The Butterfly Lampshade. Knopf. ISBN 9780385534871.
