= Stambach (disambiguation) =

Stambach may refer to:

- Stambach, Austria
- Stambach, part of Contwig
- Scott Stambach

== See also ==
- Stammbach
- Stammbuch (disambiguation)
