= David Zimmerman =

David Zimmerman may refer to:

- David Zimmerman (photographer) (1955–)
- David H. Zimmerman (politician, 1956–)
- David Zimmerman (writer)
