= Stammbuch =

The German term Stammbuch may refer to:

- a roll of arms, a book of coats of arms
- an album amicorum, a book of friends' autographs

== See also ==
- Stambach (disambiguation)
- Stammbach
