= Zoë Ferraris =

American novelist

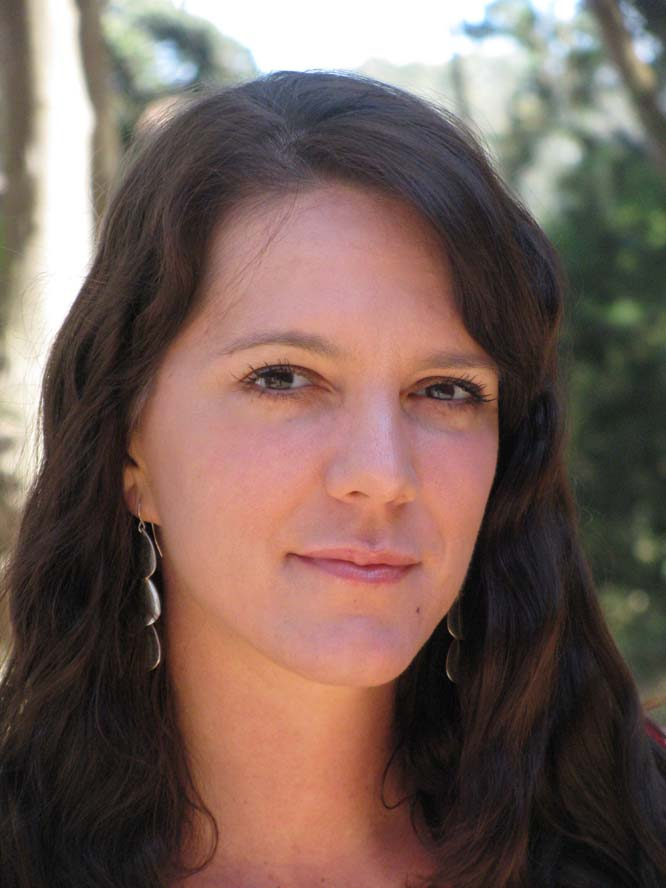
- Born: Oklahoma, U.S.
- Occupation: Novelist
- Writing career
- Notable awards: Alex Award (2009)
- Website: www.zoeferraris.com

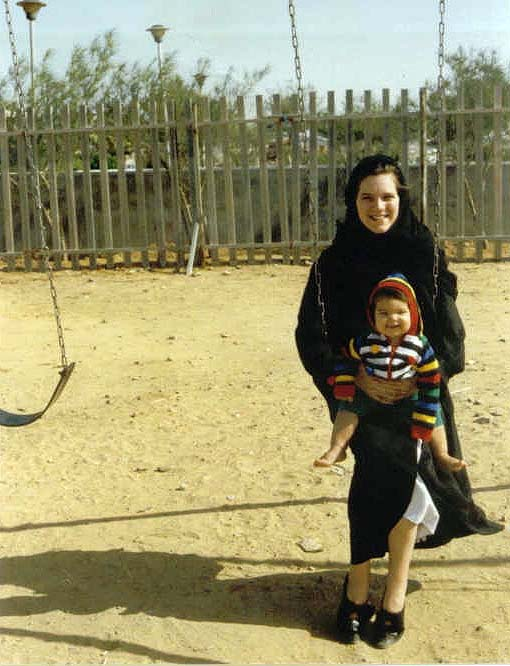
Ferraris in Saudi Arabia

Zoë Ferraris is an American novelist. She was born in Oklahoma. In 1991 she married a man from Saudi Arabia. She lived in Jeddah, Saudi Arabia, with her in-laws for nine months. Her time in Saudi Arabia is the background for the three novels she has written. She has also written a children's novel.

== Awards ==
In 2009, Ferraris won an Alex Award for Finding Nouf.

Finding Nouf also won the 2008 Los Angeles Times Book Prize in the Art Seidenbaum Award for First Fiction category.

== Books ==
=== Nayir ash-Sharqi and Katya Hijazi series ===
- Finding Nouf (2008) follows main character Nayir ash-Sharqi, a Palestinian guide, as he attempts to solve the murder of a young girl. The girl went missing three days before what was to be her arranged marriage. ISBN 978-0547237787 In the UK the book was published under the title "The night of the Mi'raj". ISBN 978-0349120324
- City of Veils (2010) also features characters Nayir ash-Sharqi and Katya Hijazi, both featured in Finding Nouf. This time they are investigating the murder of a young woman whose body was discovered washed up on a beach. The victim, Leila Nawar, was a film-maker working on a subversive film about the Qur'an's origins. The Guardian critic and crime writer Laura Wilson recommended Ferraris's second novel as one of the best fiction books of 2010. ISBN 9780316074278
- Kingdom of Strangers: A Novel (2012) ISBN 978-0316074247

=== Other ===
- Galaxy Pirates: Hunt for the Pyxis (2015) ISBN 978-0385392167
