= Clemantine Wamariya =

Rwandan-American author and artist

Joyful Clemantine Wamariya
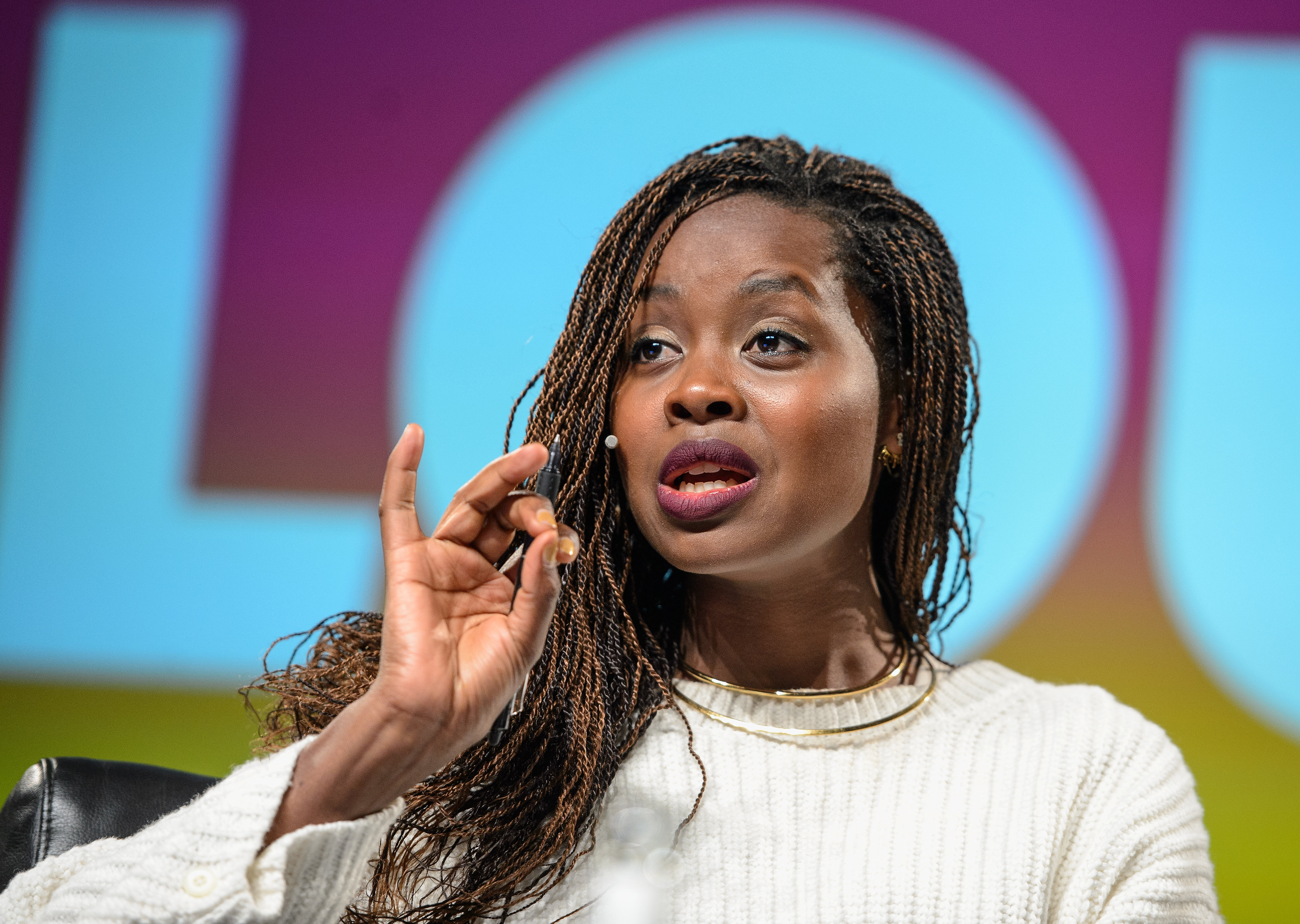
- Clemantine in Berlin, 2017
- Born: 1988 (age 37–38); Kigali, Rwanda
- Occupations: Author; Artist; Creative; Human-rights Advocate
- Awards: Winner of the 2019 ALA/YALSA Alex Award

Joyful Clemantine Wamariya (born 1988) is a Rwandan-American author, speaker, and human rights advocate.

Born in Rwanda, she was forced to leave her home in Kigali and her parents at the age of six due to the Rwandan genocide. She sought refuge with her extended family in the south of the country but was forced to flee again when the genocidaires targeted the family there. She and her older sister escaped the country and spent several years seeking refuge through Africa before being granted a refugee asylum to the United States.

She settled with a family in the Chicago area and began formal schooling for the first time at the age of thirteen. She gained international attention in 2006 through an appearance on The Oprah Winfrey Show which featured a surprise reunion with her parents. After graduating from Yale University, she pursued a career as a storyteller with engagements including a TED talk. In 2018, she published a book recounting her life experiences, titled The Girl Who Smiled Beads. She is a 2019 recipient of the Alex Awards.

== Early life ==
Wamariya was born in Rwanda and grew up in nine countries throughout east and southern Africa. Her father was a businessman in the taxi sector and her mother was a nurse and gardener, growing fruit and flowers at the family's home. She also had a devoted nanny.

The Rwandan genocide began in April 1994, when Wamariya was six years old. The family began hearing loud noises from the gunfire, which her brother Pudi attributed to thunder, and they noticed that their neighbors were absent. Realising the danger, she and her sister, Claire, were sent to the south of the country to live on her grandmother's farm. However, they were still targeted at the farm, and as the genocidaires knocked on the door, she and Claire were told by their grandmother to run away. By traveling at night and hiding during the day, surviving on fruit, they managed to escape from the country and became refugees.

The first safe haven the sisters reached was a refugee camp in Burundi, but they were unable to settle in any one place for long. A combination of violence within the camps and a desire to find a location with a more prosperous outlook meant they spent many years traveling between camps. Over the next six years they moved from Burundi to Zaire, Tanzania, Malawi, Mozambique, and eventually to South Africa. From there, in 2000, the sisters applied to the International Organization for Migration for assistance, and were granted refugee visas to the United States.

Wamariya and her sisters were resettled by the Chicago branch of the refugee resettlement organization World Relief, which partnered with a family in the Chicago, Illinois suburb of Kenilworth.

Once settled in the US, Wamariya began attending school for the first time at the age of thirteen. She studied from the sixth grade at a Christian Heritage Academy, before moving to the New Trier High School in nearby Winnetka. After graduating from New Trier in 2008, she studied at Yale University, where she obtained a BA degree in Comparative Literature in 2014.

== Career ==
=== Appearance on The Oprah Winfrey Show ===
Wamariya appeared on The Oprah Winfrey Show in 2006, while still a student at New Trier. Along with her sister Claire, she was booked to appear on the show to discuss her experience during the genocide. Unbeknownst to the sisters, Winfrey had planned a surprise reunion with their parents. Both her father and mother had survived the genocide, and she had communicated with them by phone, but had not seen them in person for twelve years. The show's producers arranged the parents' flights from Africa and their reunion was televised. Wamariya was invited as a guest on the Oprah show on three further occasions during the subsequent years, and her appearances on the show gained her international attention.

=== Storytelling ===
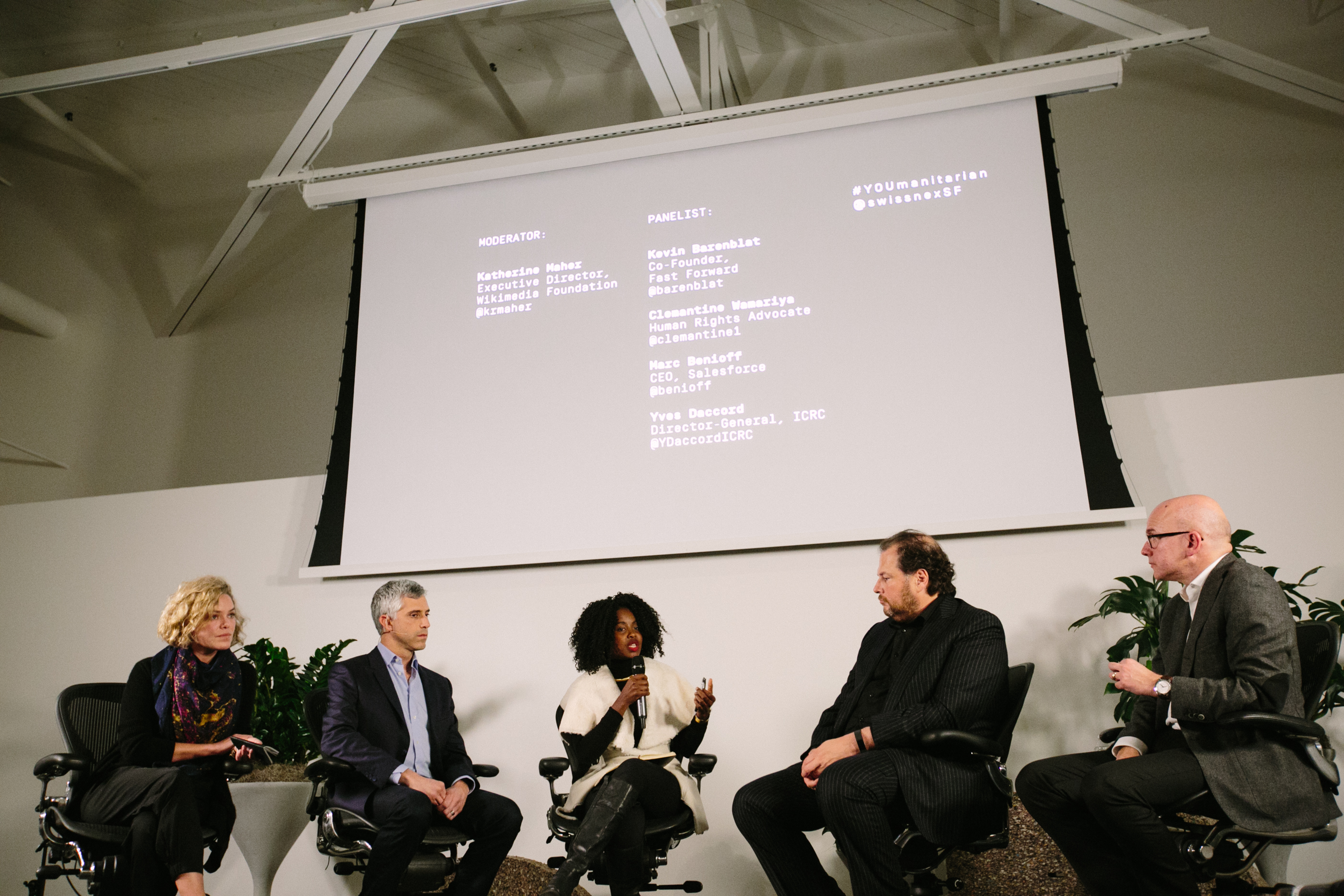
Wamariya in 2016, on a panel with Katherine Maher, Marc Benioff, and Yves Daccord

Wamariya developed an interest in storytelling during her school years, as she shared her experiences with fellow students. After her appearances on Oprah, event organizers, especially in the humanitarian aid sector, invited her to speak. Her engagements have included a TED talk titled War and What Comes After, lunch and dinner speeches, and appearances at fundraising events.

Following her appearance on Oprah, and while a student at Yale, Wamariya carried out her storytelling across the US for the United States Holocaust Memorial Museum (USHMM). In recognition of this, and her work with refugee organization at Yale and in New Haven, Connecticut, she was appointed to the board of the USHMM by President Barack Obama. She was re-appointed for a second five-year term in 2016.

=== Writing ===
After completing her degree at Yale, Wamariya moved to San Francisco, where she met The New York Times journalist Elizabeth Weil, who lived in the same area. She recounted her life experiences to Weil, and the two started drafting a feature-length article. They received a positive reception and decided to expand the work into a full book. They spent two years working on it, and it was released in 2018 as The Girl Who Smiled Beads. The title refers to a story told to her by her nanny as a child, in which Wamariya controlled the plot and destiny of the characters. In a Q&A with the book's publisher, she cited Elie Wiesel's holocaust memoir Night as an inspiration, having read the book when she was in school. She came to terms with the horrors she endured and read the works of Audre Lorde, Toni Morrison, Octavia Butler, and W.G. Sebald (who taught her that “we live in all times and places at once”).
