= The Girl Who Smiled Beads =

2018 memoir by Clemantine Wamariya and Elizabeth Weil

The Girl Who Smiled Beads: A Story About War and What Comes After
- Author: Clemantine Wamariya and Elizabeth Weil
- Language: English
- Subject: Rwandan genocide, Rwandan Civil War
- Genre: Memoir
- Publisher: Doubleday Canada
- Publication date: April 24, 2018
- Publication place: United States
- Media type: Print
- ISBN: 9780385687003

The Girl Who Smiled Beads: A Story About War and What Comes After is a memoir by Clemantine Wamariya, written alongside Elizabeth Weil, published April 24, 2018 by Doubleday Canada. The memoir follows Wamariya's experience as a childhood refugee from Rwanda. The book was a New York Times best seller, was critically acclaimed, and received various accolades.

== Plot ==
The Girl Who Smiled Beads begins in Rwanda during the Rwandan Civil War, when Wamariya was six years old. Alongside her sister Claire, Wamariya fled Rwanda, spending the next six years traveling through seven African countries as refugees. In 2000, the Wamariya sisters were granted asylum in the United States, and they landed in Chicago, unsettled. Although Wamariya spoke five languages, she did not speak English, and at twelve years old, she had never attended school formally. The Girl Who Smiled Beads showcases how, even after being granted asylum, refugees often do not feel settled and struggle to find their way in a new country.

== Reception ==
The Girl Who Smiled Beads was a New York Times best seller.

The book received starred reviews from Publishers Weekly, calling it "a powerful coming-of-age story." It also received positive reviews from The Washington Post, Star Tribune, Booklist, Kirkus Reviews, Library Journal, and The Atlantic. The New York Times Book Review provided a mixed review. The New York Times included it in one of their "recommended books" lists.

Beyond popular media outlets, The Girl Who Smiled Beads has been discussed in academic contexts, including The Lancet, Roots International Journal of Multidisciplinary Researches, and Journal of the Campus Read.

Accolades for The Girl Who Smiled Beads
Year	Accolade	Result	Ref.
2019	Andrew Carnegie Medals for Excellence	Longlist	
2019	Alex Award	Winner	
2018	Goodreads Choice Award for Memoir & Autobiography	Nominee	
2018	Washington Post Notable Nonfiction Book of 2018	Selection	
2018	Kirkus Reviews' Best Biographies of 2018	Selection	
