= An Unkindness of Magicians =

2017 fantasy novel by Kat Howard

- Author: Kat Howard
- Language: English
- Genre: Urban Fantasy, Magic, Fantasy
- Published: 2017 (Saga /Simon & Schuster)
- Publication place: United States

An Unkindness of Magicians is a 2017 urban fantasy novel by Kat Howard. The book was selected as the NPR Best Book of 2017 and won the 2018 Alex Award.

== Synopsis ==
The magical Houses of New York, or as they term themselves – the Unseen World – are linked by social and familial connections, by old feuds, and by old betrayals. This all-White, old-moneyed community of privilege works by its own rules, unknown and unseen by the mundane residents of the city. At the base of the magical world's social structure, is The Turning: Once every generation or so, a magical tournament is held to determine the magical pecking order; who can establish or maintain a House, who must relinquish theirs, and who shall lead them. For many years now, House Merlin has stood at the head of the Unseen World.

Laurent Beauchamps is a newcomer to the Unseen world, unusual in many ways: He is Black, and comes from a mundane background. But Gray Prospero, a privileged son of one of the oldest Houses, takes Laurent under his wing and teaches him magic. When a new Turning is announced only ten years after the last, the magical world is clued in to the fact that something might be awry. Laurent hires an unknown magician named Sydney to represent him in the tournament. Sydney, the reader comes to find out, has her own agenda regarding The Turning, but is also under the thrall of the House of Shadows, and faces a harsh dilemma how to work out her conflicting paths.

The mysterious House of Shadows sits at the edge of the Unseen World's awareness: Dark happenings and nefarious schemes slowly come clear, especially regarding the role of children growing into adulthood in Shadows, suffering greatly as prisoners with almost no way out. A generation or two ago, House Merlin made a deal with Shadows on behalf of the Unseen World, and the fate of the children is tied to this deal: Each family must pay a tithe in the form of their firstborn child; In turn, Shadows enables them to do magic without paying any physical or mental cost to themselves.

But this new Turning promises to expose old secrets and create new chaos: Suddenly, magic seems to be failing, and people die in the non-mortal combat. Sydney, who is extremely powerful, which is how she was able to gain partial release from Shadows, is determined to overturn the system and get revenge upon the community and House that tithed her and doomed her to a lifetime of suffering for their own comfort. She is joined by Harper and Madison, and her compatriot from Shadows, Verenice, in her quest.

== Characters ==
- Sydney: A powerful magician who seems to appear out of nowhere. Laurent hires her to represent him in The Turning, the contests of magical combat that will determine the leadership of the Unseen World. Sydney has an agenda of her own, and is also under coercion by the House of Shadows. It is unclear how all the crisscrossing developments and plans will play themselves out.
- Laurent Beauchamps: A black man and a newcomer in a world of old, white moneyed families. He is wealthy and determined to carve a place for himself in the Unseen World, and found a house of his own. Gray Prospero is his best friend and mentor in the magical world; Laurent is unaware of Gray's violent actions.
- Miranda Prospero: Head of House Prospero; has disinherited her son Gray Prospero, who kills young women to steal their magic. She hires Ian Merlin, reputed to be the most powerful of all magicians, to represent her house in the contests.
- Ian Merlin: Estranged son of Miles Merlin, brother to Lara Merlin, who represents the House of Merlin in the contest. He agrees to represent Prospero in the magical contests on the condition that when that house ascends to leadership of the Unseen World, the community's dark bargain with the mysterious House of Shadows will be undone. He faces the possibility of going up against his sister in the final face-off, which is to the death. Ian is Sydney's sometime/potential love interest.
- Miles Merlin: Head of the House Merlin, who has stood for many years at the head of the Unseen World of New York. Is losing his magic, and enters a devil's bargain to keep it.
- Harper Douglas: A young woman from the outskirts of the magical Unseen World, who is determined to discover who killed her best friend.
- Shara: A powerful magician bound to the House of Shadows; its human avatar.
- Madison: A lawyer for the Unseen World families, and friend and ally to Sydney and Harper.
- Verenice: The only person to ever have escaped the hold of the House of Shadows, before Sydney.

== Themes ==
One of the main themes of An Unkindness of Magicians is power and exploitation, examining how the powerful are knowingly or through purposeful ignorance led into exploiting others to gain or hold onto power (Gray Prospero and Miles Merlin intentionally cause death and destruction for power, while Miranda Prospero turns a blind eye and tries not to think about the high costs paid by others for her benefit). These attitudes are contrasted with the ethics of those, such as Ian Merlin, who turned his back on using other people’s suffering to fuel his magic as soon as he could; or Harper, who without magic of her own, nevertheless immerses herself in the dangers of the Unseen World in order to call her friend’s killer to account; and Laurent, who disavows Gray when he learns of his true nature, and takes it upon himself to relearn magic when he learns the nature of the bargain with Shadows; and the main protagonist, Sydney, who in the final showdown chooses to protect others at a terrible cost to herself.

== Reception ==
Liz Bourke, reviewing An Unkindess of Magicians for Locus Magazine, writes: "[It] is a really good book. Its characters come vividly alive, its prose is precisely observed, and it’s both tense and incredibly compelling. I liked so many things about it – the way that Sydney has friends, female friends, despite her traumatic history, and the way she cares about them; the complicated and slowly-blossoming relationship between her and Ian Merlin, which is overshadowed by the knowledge that they may end up fighting to the death; the way that Howard treats her emotional themes deftly, with understated grace."

In San Francisco Book Review, Mandy Nevius finds the Unseen World's rules to be sometimes "too convenient" or under-explained, but writes, however, that "Howard’s magical world is wonderfully vivid; the magic itself engages all the senses, making each spell feel tangible. The disturbing, thrilling, and lovely moments pulse with striking language, and the fast-paced story is polished with a bit of humor that helps keep the novel light and fun. This riveting book is perfect for readers who want to escape."

The Kirkus review of the novel says that "the sickness at the heart of this world is presented in stark and compelling terms, and the many magical battles keep the stakes high, although some of the big moments feel a little rushed." And adds, "Strong characters and a captivating revenge plot make this a fun, absorbing read for those who like their magic, and their magicians, dark and twisty."

Em Nordling, writing for Tor, calls An Unkindess of Magicians a "fun and fast-paced read, and is impossible to look away from."

== Awards ==
Year	Award	Category	Result
2018	Alex Award		Won
2017	NPR Best Book		Won
2017	Locus Award	Best Science Fiction Novel	Nominated
