= The God of Animals =

2007 novel by Aryn Kyle

- Cover of the U.S. first edition
- Author: Aryn Kyle
- Genre: Literary Fiction Bildungsroman
- Publisher: Scribner
- Publication date: 2007
- Pages: 320
- ISBN: 978-1-4165-3325-2

The God of Animals is the debut novel by Aryn Kyle first published in 2007.

== Plot ==
Alice Winston, a twelve-year-old girl, struggles with her place in the world the summer after her sister runs away from home and marries a rodeo cowboy. Her mother—bedridden because of postpartum depression—hasn't left her bedroom since Alice was an infant, and her father is failing to keep their horse ranch running. In order to survive, Joe Winston begins boarding wealthy women's horses, dreaming of the day when his ranch will overflow with children taking show lessons. During the hottest summer in decades, a series of trials overcome the Winstons, teaching Alice how cruel life can be.

== Major themes ==
Friendship: After Polly Cain is found dead, Alice imagines what it would be like if the two girls were friends. When she begins talking to Mr. Delmar, Alice lies and says that Polly was her best friend, because nobody can prove otherwise. When Sheila begins taking lessons at the Winston's ranch, Alice is jealous and keeps her distance. During the nightly chats with Mr. Delmar, Alice uses parts of Sheila's life to lie about her own life, particularly aspects that Alice is embarrassed about. By the end of the novel, Alice realizes that she does indeed share a friendship with Sheila, despite their differences.

Family: Alice's sister, Nona runs away at the age of 16, leaving Alice to grow up without the help of a big sister. Alice's mother isolates herself in her bedroom, and Alice finds herself torn between her two parents often: should she keep her mother company or should she be helping her father with the horses? Throughout the novel, Alice struggles with her family and how she fits in.

Death: The novel opens with Polly Cain's death, the event that drives much of Alice's actions throughout The God of Animals. Living on a ranch, Alice Winston faces the death of horses. Joe Winston, Alice's father, has a weakness for the "kill horses", or injured horses that nobody else wants.

Puberty: Alice is twelve, and while she still seems childish, grows up during the summer between sixth and seventh grades. She longs to grow up and leave the farm as Nona did, but fears the time when she won't be needed by her parents. Alice, embarrassed by her family's lacking income, doesn't tell her father that she's outgrown all of her clothes, instead, mixing her too-small clothing with Nona's too-big clothing. The combination of clothing reflects her current stage of life—not a child, but not yet an adult.

Love: Alice falls in love with Mr. Delmar throughout their nightly chats. Because of her sister running away, Alice's father reminds her frequently not to fall in love and run away, trying to convince her to stay away from all boys.

Truth: Alice is constantly faced with matters of truth. Why did her sister run away, and more importantly, why did she come back? Who was Polly Cain? What motivates Mr. Delmar to continue speaking to her? What does friendship mean?

== Development history ==
The first chapter of The God of Animals was originally published as a short story, Foaling Season, written by Aryn Kyle. Foaling Season won a National Magazine Award for Fiction for The Atlantic in 2004.

=== Publication history ===
2007, USA, Scribner ISBN 978-1-4165-3325-2, Pub date 1 March 2007, Hardback

=== Explanation of the novel's title ===
The God of Animals refers to Alice's questioning of whether or not a god exists. Mr. Delmar, Alice's 7th grade English teacher, discusses religion with Alice during one of their many nightly conversations about life. While both Alice and Mr. Delmar state that they do not believe in God, Alice believes there should be a God to watch over animals.

== Awards and nominations ==
- 2008 winner of the American Library Association's Alex Awards
- 2008 winner of the Best Western Long Award Spur Award for Best Novel of the West
- 2008 winner of the PNBA Award Pacific Northwest Booksellers Association Award
- The Mountains and Plains Independent Booksellers Association Award
- Book Sense Pick
