= Karen Bender =

American novelist and short story writer

- Writing career
- Genres: Novels, short stories
- Notable awards: Rona Jaffe Foundation Writers' Award
- Website: karenebender.com

Karen E. Bender is an American novelist and short story writer.

== Biography ==
Karen E. Bender is the author of the short story collection Refund, which was a finalist for the National Book Award for Fiction for 2015 and on the shortlist for the 2015 Frank O'Connor International Short Story Award. She also composed the novels A Town of Empty Rooms and Like Normal People; Like Normal People was a Los Angeles Times Bestseller and a Washington Post Best Book of the Year. Both her collections Refund and The New Order were longlisted for The Story Prize.

Writing about "A Town of Empty Rooms", reviewer S. Kirk Walsh said in the Boston Globe,

In the very best of fiction, an intimate, spiritual communion momentarily transpires between reader and author. In the case of Bender’s novel, these moments occur during these flawless passages of authentic longing and isolation. Like some of today’s best contemporary realistic authors, Bender skillfully excavates and animates the human fragilities and missteps of life, transporting the reader deeper into the narrative and the interior lives of her characters.

Bender has taught fiction writing for the MFA programs at Hollins University, Chatham University, Tunghai University in Taiwan, and the University of North Carolina Wilmington. She is on the Core faculty for Alma College and is a Visiting Writer at the MFA program at SUNY Stony Brook. She has received grants from the Rona Jaffe Foundation and the National Endowment for the Arts. She is also co-editor of the nonfiction anthology Choice.

Her short stories have appeared in magazines, including The New Yorker, Granta, Ploughshares, Zoetrope, Story, The Kenyon Review, Guernica, Narrative, The Harvard Review and The Iowa Review. Her fiction has been anthologized in The Best American Short Stories, The Best American Mystery Stories, New Stories from the South and The Pushcart Prize series and has been read as part of the "Selected Short" series at Symphony Space in New York. Her work has also been read by Levar Burton as part of his series "Levar Burton Reads."

She has written nonfiction for The New York Times, Real Simple, O magazine and others.

Her sister is novelist and short story writer Aimee Bender.

== Works ==
=== Books ===
- —— (2000). Like Normal People. Boston: Houghton Mifflin Harcourt. ISBN 9780618126927.
- —— (2013). A Town of Empty Rooms. Berkeley, CA: Counterpoint. ISBN 9781619020696.
- —— (2015). Refund: Stories. Berkeley, CA: Counterpoint Press. ISBN 9781619024557.
- —— (2018). The New Order: Stories. Berkeley, CA: Counterpoint Press. ISBN 9781640090996.
- —— (2025). The Words of Dr. L and Other Stories. Berkeley, CA: Counterpoint Press.

=== Articles, essays ===
- —— (September 13, 1999). "For the Fourth Prussian Dynasty". The New Yorker.
