= Melissa Blake (writer) =

American writer, journalist, and disability activist

Melissa Blake (born 1981) is an American writer, blogger, journalist, and disability activist. She is best known for her blog "So About What I Said", where she discusses relationships, pop culture, and disability. Her work has appeared in The New York Times, Bustle, CNN, and Good Housekeeping, among others. Blake is an alumnus of Northern Illinois University, where she received a bachelor's degree in journalism; she currently resides in DeKalb, Illinois.

Blake lives with Freeman-Sheldon Syndrome, a genetic disorder affecting her bones and muscles in addition to causing a visible facial difference. Her disability activism has helped her to feel confident and proud of her identity as a disabled woman.

== Personal life ==
Blake was born in 1981. Because of her disability, she spent much of her time in hospitals. To straighten the bones in her legs, Blake wore an Ilizarov apparatus multiple times. She also had an operation on her spine to correct severe spinal cord compression when she was 13. Her last major surgery was a knee fusion surgery at the age of 15.

Blake's father died by suicide in March 2003 after undergoing treatment for sinus cancer.

== Career ==
Blake is an outspoken critic of United States president Donald Trump; she was harassed online after writing an article about him for CNN in 2019.

After being told by a troll that she should be banned from posting pictures of herself online, Blake began posting daily selfies on Twitter (now X) in order to promote disability acceptance.

Blake's first book, Beautiful People, was published by Hachette Go in March 2024. It won an Alex Award from the Young Adult Library Services Association the following year.

== Publications ==
- Beautiful People: My Thirteen Truths About Disability. Hachette Go. 2024. ISBN 978-0-306-83042-6.
