= The Girl in the Flammable Skirt =

Collection of short stories by Aimee Bender

- Author: Aimee Bender
- Language: English
- Published: Doubleday
- Publication date: 1998
- Publication place: United States of America
- ISBN: 0385492154

The Girl in the Flammable Skirt is a collection of short stories by American novelist Aimee Bender. It was originally published in 1998 by Doubleday, receiving a spot on the New York Times Notable Books the same year. The book follows stories of young women with unlikely dilemmas.

== Structure ==
The Girl in the Flammable Skirt is a book that showcases a collection of short stories that do not intertwine in any way. The characters and setting from one story are completely separate from the next. The only common link between the 16 short stories of the book is the recurrence of twisted and unusual conflict. These conflicts drive each story until there is nothing left to get out of them.

Aimee Bender's contemporary fiction is often categorized as surreal, magical, and even phantasmagoric. All of these descriptions can be clearly recognized throughout The Girl in the Flammable Skirt as everyday things and occurrences such as objects, relationships, and loss are turned grotesque and satirical. Bender creates vivid imagery with minimal words as she is straight to the point and does not show anything more than necessary.

== Stories ==
"The Rememberer" follows a wife losing her husband to reverse evolution as he goes from man to salamander.

"Call My Name" exhibits a lonely woman's adventure in craving attention and sex from a man who would prefer to watch game shows on the television.

"What You Left in the Ditch" shows the inner and outer conflict a wife experiences when her husband returns home from the war without his lips.

"The Bowl" follows a woman who receives a mysterious delivery of a bowl and experiences her boss dying.

"Marzipan" looks through a young woman's eyes as her father acquires a large hole in his abdomen and her mother gives birth to her dead grandmother.

"Quiet Please" follows a librarian who continuously has sex in her library with unsuspecting men on the day her father has died.

"Skinless" follows a connection between a halfway house employee who is Jewish and a young boy who draws swastikas.

"Fugue" follows three different people who are unhappy with their life in someway.

"Drunken Mini" shows an imp and a mermaid's unique interaction.

"Fell This Girl" follows a woman and her confusing sexual desires.

"The Healer" told the story of two girls, one with a hand made of fire and one with a hand made of ice.

"Loser" follows an orphan boy who has a talent of finding missing things, that develops as he grows older.

"Legacy" follows a pregnant girl’s journey of falling in love with a hunchback

"Dreaming in Polish" shows a town with a few different people; a daughter with an adventurer mother and a sick father, and an old husband and wife with prophetic dreams.

"The Ring" follows the love story of a woman and a Robber who turn a mile of the ocean red.

"The Girl in the Flammable Skirt" tells the story of a girl who has an unhealthy father and has a boyfriend in her closet.

== Adaptations ==
In 2002, four of the stories (“Call My Name", "Fugue", “Fell This Girl” and “The Girl in the Flammable Skirt”) were adapted to the theatre by Frederique Michel. In 2011, the short story "The Girl in the Flammable Skirt" was the basis of a short film of the same name co-written by Aimee Bender and directed by Maggie Tran.
