= Joseph Harold Sheldon =

- Born: 27 September 1893; Woodford, Essex, England
- Died: 22 June 1972 (aged 78); Codsall Wood, Staffordshire, England
- Education: Bancroft’s School
- Alma mater: King’s College Hospital Medical School
- Occupations: Physician, surgeon, and gerontologist
- Known for: The Social Medicine of Old Age (1948); Freeman–Sheldon syndrome
- Spouse: Majorie Bannister (m. 1924)
- Children: 2 (one died at birth)

Joseph Harold Sheldon CBE FRCP (27 September 1893 - 22 June 1972) was a British physician, surgeon, and gerontologist.

== Education and career ==
After education at Bancroft's, a Drapers’ Company School at Woodford, J. Harold Sheldon went to work at the secretarial department of Lloyds Bank. As he approached the age of twenty, he became fervently religious and decided to leave Lloyds Bank and become a Christian medical missionary. With a Worsley scholarship, he began the study of medicine at King's College Hospital Medical School in 1913.

When he had completed only one year of his clinical studies, he joined the Navy as a Surgeon Probationer, as it was possible to do in the first world war, and saw service in a sloop, HMS Wistaria, in the Mediterranean. He returned for study leave at intervals to complete his clinical work and to qualify.

After qualifying MRCS, LRCP and graduating MB BS (Lond.) in 1918, he volunteered, after the end of WWI, as a Surgeon Lieutenant for mine-sweeping in the Baltic. He abandoned his ambition to become a medical missionary. He held appointments at King's College Hospital and from 1919 to 1920 was Sambroke Surgical Registrar and Tutor there. In 1920 he graduated MD and qualified MRCP. In 1921 he was appointed to the staff of the Royal Hospital, Wolverhampton. In 1929 he was elected FRCP.

His early work was mainly on mineral elements. His Hunterian Lecture to the College of Surgeons in 1928 was entitled "An undescribed disease of bone", but he had already been writing on haemochromatosis and he began studying this disease in depth, gave the Bradshaw Lecture on the subject at the RCP in 1934, and published the results as a book in 1935.

He gained an outstanding medical reputation throughout the Midlands and into mid-Wales. In Wolverhampton, he arranged his out-patient clinic to coincide with market day, for the convenience of his patients. He was consultant physician to several hospitals.

He visited the old people of Wolverhampton in their homes, and his Social Medicine of Old Age is still an important publication. His report to the Birmingham Regional Hospital Board on its geriatric services helped the region to lead the country in the geriatric field.

Sheldon's Wolverhampton community survey of elderly people, the first of its kind after the war, was carried out at the behest of the Nuffield Foundation, chaired by Seebohm Rowntree. The ration card register was used to locate the random 1-in-30 sample of 583 old people (186 men over 65 and 397 women over 60 years). The survey was carried out between January and April 1945.

Sheldon's 1961 Report to the Birmingham Regional Hospital Board on its Geriatric Service found inadequate hospital services for infirm geriatric patients. He made several recommendations including replacement of some older hospital buildings, appointment of more geriatric physicians, more postgraduate medical education in modern geriatrics, and adequate staffing of all sections of rehabilitation teams for geriatric patients.

In 1949 under the auspices of the Royal College of Physicians, he gave the F. E. Williams Lecture on the role of the aged in modern society. In 1954 he was elected president of the International Association of Gerontology, and in 1955 he went on an international lecture tour devoted to gerontology. In 1955 he was appointed CBE. In 1956 he was made a Fellow of King's College London.

In 1938, Sheldon alongside Ernest Arthur Freeman described the eponymous Freeman–Sheldon syndrome.

== Hobbies ==
A keen ornithologist and photographer, he combined the two hobbies for a time to study the flight of birds, how they dived and the stability of some of them when asleep standing on one leg. He published in British Birds his observations over a number of years on the movements of the Northern golden plover while on migration through South Staffordshire.

In his earlier years he did a good deal of mountaineering years and in 1928 was honoured by the French Government for a courageous Alpine rescue on the Aiguille of the Petit Dru. He was a member of the Alpine Club and president of the Midland Association of Mountaineers.

== Family ==
J. Harold Sheldon had two brothers and two sisters. His brother Wilfrid became Sir Wilfrid Sheldon KCVO, FRCP, and his brother Geoffrey Colin Sheldon (1906–1997) became a general practitioner in Reigate.

In 1921 in Newport, Monmouthshire, J. Harold Sheldon married Marjorie Bannister. Their first child, Peggy, was born in 1924. Their second child died at birth. In 1927 they took a trip to the Alps, and Marjorie died, probably from a large pulmonary embolus, while they were mountaineering.

In 1961 on the Isle of Wight, he married Miss Luckett, with whom he had worked for many years. The couple moved to a small cottage in Codsall Wood.

== Selected publications ==
- Sheldon, J. H. (November 1926). "Specimens from a Case of Multiple Bony Lesions, Shown in November, 1925". Proc R Soc Med. 20 (1): 1–2. doi:10.1177/003591572602000101. PMC 2100480. PMID 19985431.
- Sheldon, J. H. (1926). "A Case of Multiple Bony Lesions for Diagnosis". Proc R Soc Med. 19(Clin Sect) (Clin Sect): 7–12. doi:10.1177/003591572601900208. PMC 1948511. PMID 19984871.
- Sheldon, J. H. (January 1929). "An undescribed disease of bone". British Journal of Surgery. 16 (63): 405–430. doi:10.1002/bjs.1800166306.
- with Hugh Ramage: Sheldon, J. H.; Ramage, H. (1931). "A spectrographic analysis of human tissues". Biochemical Journal. 25 (5): 1608–1627. doi:10.1042/bj0251608. PMC 1260788. PMID 16744726.
- with Wilfrid Sheldon: Sheldon, J. H.; Sheldon, W. (February 1932). "Dermatomyositis". Proc R Soc Med. 25 (4): 413–415. doi:10.1177/003591573202500429. PMC 2183867. PMID 19988528.
- Sheldon, J. H. (12 November 1932). "Some considerations on the influence of copper and manganese on the therapeutic activity of iron". Br Med J. 2 (3749): 869–872. doi:10.1136/bmj.2.3749.869. PMC 2521633. PMID 20777164.
- with Hugh Ramage: Ramage, H.; Sheldon, J. H. (1933). "A spectrographic analysis of the metallic content of meconium". Biochem J. 27 (3): 674–677. doi:10.1042/bj0270674. PMC 1252929. PMID 16745143.
- Sheldon, J. H. (13 January 1934). "The mineral basis of life". Br Med J. 1 (3810): 47–53. doi:10.1136/bmj.1.3810.47. PMC 2444068. PMID 20777999.
- Sheldon, J. H. (April 1934). "Calcinosis Universalis". Proc R Soc Med. 27 (6): 623–626. doi:10.1177/003591573402700601. PMC 2205345. PMID 19989731.
- Sheldon, J. H. (July 1938). "Clinical Reports and Demonstrations: Section for the Study of Disease in Children. Arterial Calcification and Subcutaneous Calcinosis: Case shown in January, 1936". Proc R Soc Med. 31 (9): 1119–1120. doi:10.1177/003591573803100947. PMC 2076984. PMID 19991613.
- with Wilfrid Sheldon: Sheldon, J. H.; Sheldon, W. (March 1936). "Arterial Calcification and Subcutaneous Calcinosis in a boy aged 20 months". Proc R Soc Med. 29 (5): 499–500.1. doi:10.1177/003591573602900529. PMC 2076128. PMID 19990644.
- with Herbert Dingle: Dingle, H.; Sheldon, J. H. (June 1938). "A spectrographic examination of the mineral content of human and other milk". Biochem J. 32 (6): 1078–1086. doi:10.1042/bj0321078. PMC 1264149. PMID 16746716.
- wit E. A. Freeman: Freeman, E. A.; Sheldon, J. H. (July 1938). "Two Cases of Cranio-Carpo-Tarsal Dystrophy of? Undescribed Type". Proc R Soc Med. 31 (9): 1116–1119. doi:10.1177/003591573803100946. PMC 2076962. PMID 19991612.
- Sheldon, J. H. (February 1939). "Sjögren's Syndrome associated with Pigmentation and Sclerodermia of the Legs". Proc R Soc Med. 32 (4): 255–256. doi:10.1177/003591573903200401. PMC 1997442. PMID 19991771.
- Sheldon, J. H. (March 1947). "Purpura Necrotica: A Possible Clinical Application of the Shwartzman Phenomenon". Arch Dis Child. 22 (109): 7–13. doi:10.1136/adc.22.109.7. PMC 1988029. PMID 20249017.
- Sheldon, J. H. (11 February 1950). "The Aged in Modern Society". Br Med J. 1 (4649): 319–323. doi:10.1136/bmj.1.4649.319. PMC 2036839. PMID 15405008.
- Sheldon, J. H. (26 December 1953). "The Clinical Spectrum of Obesity". Br Med J. 2 (4851): 1402–1404. doi:10.1136/bmj.2.4851.1402. PMC 2030408. PMID 13106439.
- Sheldon, J. H. (July 1958). "On Growing Old". Med J Southwest. 73 (3): 69–77. PMC 5087161. PMID 28907876.
- Sheldon, J. H. (23 April 1960). "Problems of an Aging Population". Br Med J. 1 (5181): 1223–1226. doi:10.1136/bmj.1.5181.1223. PMC 1967267. PMID 14445768.
- Sheldon, J. H. (10 December 1960). "On the Natural History of Falls in Old Age". Br Med J. 2 (5214): 1685–1690. doi:10.1136/bmj.2.5214.1685. PMC 2098310. PMID 20789006.
- Sheldon, J. H. (February 1962). "Drop Attacks in the Elderly: A Request for Information". J Coll Gen Pract. 5 (1): 107–108, 109. PMC 1903268. PMID 13911614.
