= Leave Myself Behind =

2004 novel by Bart Yates

- First edition cover
- Author: Bart Yates
- Publisher: Kensington Publishing
- Publication date: March 4, 2003
- ISBN: 0-7582-0348-9

Leave Myself Behind is the 2004 debut novel by American writer Bart Yates. The plot centers on a seventeen-year-old gay boy, Noah York, and the process through which he goes as he discovers his sexuality and grows without his father. Critics have compared Leave Myself Behind to J.D. Salinger's Catcher in the Rye.

Kirkus Reviews called Leave Myself Behind "earnest and predictable: a good start but nothing special". Booklist also reviewed the novel.

In 2004, Leave Myself Behind received an Alex Award from the American Library Association.
