= Elizabeth Weil =

American journalist and nonfiction writer

- Education: Yale University
- Occupations: Novelist, journalist
- Spouse: Daniel Duane
- Writing career
- Notable work: The Girl Who Smiled Beads
- Website: www.elizabethweil.me

Elizabeth Weil is an American journalist and nonfiction writer. Weil worked for The New York Times for nearly 20 years and has also contributed freelance work to other magazines.. She has also written two nonfiction books and co-authored two nonfiction books. Her journalism has received a New York Press Club Award and a GLAAD Award. Her book The Girl Who Smiled Beads was longlisted for the Andrew Carnegie Medal for Excellence in Nonfiction. From March 2020 until December 2021, Weil wrote for ProPublica. She is a features writer for New York Magazine. Weil teaches part-time at UC Berkeley Graduate School of Journalism.

== Personal life ==
Weil graduated from Yale University. She lives in San Francisco, California with her husband (Daniel Duane), with whom she shares two daughters.

== Career ==
=== Magazines ===
Weil worked at The New York Times for nearly 20 years and has also written for ProPublica. She has also published work in Matter,The Atlantic, Outside, The California Sunday Magazine, Wired, Medium, Men's Journal, Vogue, Mother Jones, Pacific Standard, The New Republic, and others.

Her awards and nominations include:

- New York Press Club Award in Feature Reporting (2016)
- Lowell Thomas Award in travel writing
- GLAAD Award for coverage of LGBT issues
- National Magazine Award finalist
- James Beard Award in food writing
- Dart Award for coverage of trauma (2016)
- Shorty Awards Journalism nominee

Weil's work has been anthologized in The Best American Sports Writing, The Best American Food Writing, and America's Next Generation of Great Women Journalists.

=== Books ===
==== The Girl Who Smiled Beads ====
The Girl Who Smiled Beads: A Story of War and What Comes After, written with Clemantine Wamariya, was published April 24, 2018 by Crown.

The book received the following recognition:

- Andrew Carnegie Medals for Excellence in Nonfiction Longlist (2019)
- Alex Award winner (2019)
- Goodreads Choice Award Nominee for Memoir & Autobiography (2018)
- New York Times Recommended Book (2018)
- Washington Post Notable Nonfiction Book of 2018
- Glamour Best Book of 2018
- Kirkus Reviews Best Biographies of 2018
- Real Simple Best Book of 2018
- New York Times Bestseller

==== No Cheating, No Dying ====
No Cheating, No Dying: I Had a Good Marriage. Then I Tried To Make It Better. was published February 7, 2012 by Scribner.

==== They All Laughed at Christopher Columbus ====
They All Laughed at Christopher Columbus: An Incurable Dreamer Builds the First Civilian Spaceship was initially published in 2002, then republished on October 6, 2010, by Randomhouse Publishing Group.
