= Kat Howard =

American writer

Kat Howard is an American author and editor. Her stories have been published in the anthologies Stories (edited by Neil Gaiman and Al Sarrantonio), and Oz Reimagined (based on L. Frank Baum's characters). She is also a contributor to magazines such as Lightspeed, Subterranean, Uncanny Magazine and Apex. She attended the Clarion Writers Workshop in 2008. She is a 2018 recipient of the Alex Awards.

== Bibliography ==
=== Short story collections ===
- A Cathedral of Myth and Bone: Stories (Gallery / Saga Press, 2019)

=== Stand-alone ===
- The End of the Sentence (Subterranean Press, 2014), co-written with Maria Dahvana Headley, "a fairytale of ghosts and guilt, literary horror blended with the visuals of Jean Cocteau, failed executions, shapeshifting goblins, and magical blacksmithery."
- Roses and Rot (S&S/Saga, 2016)

=== The Unseen World ===
- An Unkindness of Magicians (Saga, 2017)
- A Sleight of Shadows

=== Selected short stories ===
- "The Green Knight's Wife". Uncanny Magazine. No. Thirteen. November–December 2016.
- "All Of Our Past Places", at The Journal of Unlikely Cartography
- "To Hold the Mirror", Interfictions
- "Breaking the Frame". Lightspeed. No. 27. August 2012.
- "Hath no Fury", Subterranean Press

== Awards ==
In addition to several World Fantasy Award nominations, her work has received the following awards and recognitions:

- NPR Best Book of 2014: The End of the Sentence, co-written with Maria Dahvana Headley
- Locus Award for Best First Novel finalist: Roses and Rot
- NPR Best Book of 2017: An Unkindness of Magicians
- Alex Award, 2018: An Unkindness of Magicians
