= Tupelo Hassman =

American author

- Education: Columbia University
- Occupation: Author
- Writing career
- Notable awards: Alex Award

Tupelo Hassman is an American author.

She has published stories and articles in publications including Harper's Bazaar, The Independent, The New York Times, and The Paris Review Daily, among others.

Hassman has a Masters of Fine Arts from Columbia University.

== Works ==
Her debut novel Girlchild was published by Farrar, Straus and Giroux in 2012. The book is about a girl named Rory Dawn Hendrix who is growing up in a trailer park and reads the Girl Scout Handbook for advice. It won an Alex Award in 2013.

Hassman's second novel is gods with a little g (2019).
