= Freeman–Sheldon syndrome =

Rare congenital disorder

- Other names: Distal arthrogryposis type 2A (DA2A), craniocarpotarsal dysplasia, craniocarpotarsal dystrophy, cranio-carpo-tarsal syndrome, whistling face–windmill vane hand syndrome
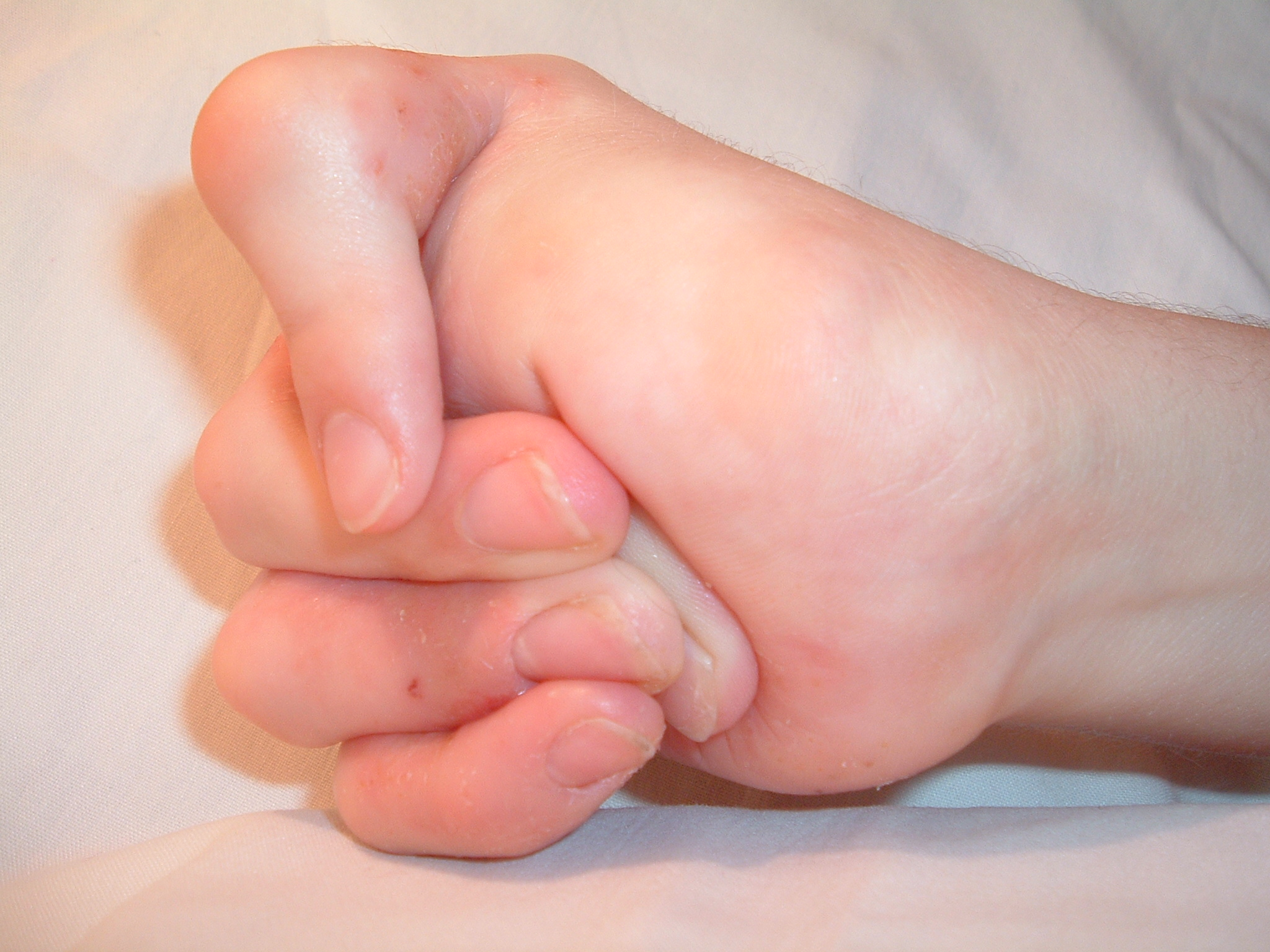
- Specialty: Medical genetics

Freeman–Sheldon syndrome (FSS) is a very rare form of multiple congenital contracture (MCC) syndromes (arthrogryposes) and is the most severe form of distal arthrogryposis (DA). It was originally described by Ernest Arthur Freeman and Joseph Harold Sheldon in 1938.

By 2007, only about 100 cases had been reported in medical literature.

== Signs and symptoms ==
The symptoms of Freeman–Sheldon syndrome include drooping of the upper eyelids, strabismus, low-set ears, a long philtrum, gradual hearing loss, scoliosis and walking difficulties. Gastroesophageal reflux has been noted during infancy, but usually improves with age. The tongue may be small, and the limited movement of the soft palate may cause nasal speech. Often there is an H- or Y-shaped dimpling of the skin over the chin.

== Cause ==
FSS is caused by genetic changes. Krakowiak et al. (1998) mapped the distal arthrogryposis multiplex congenita (DA2B; MIM #601680) gene, a syndrome very similar in phenotypic expression to classic FSS, to 11p15.5-pter. Other mutations have been found as well. In FSS, inheritance may be either autosomal dominant, most often demonstrated. or autosomal recessive (MIM 277720). Alves and Azevedo (1977) note most reported cases of DA2A have been identified as new allelic variation. Toydemir et al. (2006) showed that mutations in embryonic myosin heavy chain 3 (MYH3; MIM *160270), at 17p-13.1-pter, caused classic FSS phenotype, in their screening of 28 (21 sporadic and 7 familial) probands with distal arthrogryposis type 2A. In 20 patients (12 and 8 probands, respectively), missense mutations (R672H; MIM *160270.0001 and R672C; MIM *160270.0002) caused substitution of arg672, an embryonic myosin residue retained post-embryonically. Of the remaining 6 patients in whom they found mutations, 3 had missense private de novo (E498G; MIM *160270.0006 and Y583S) or familial mutations (V825D; MIM *160270.0004); 3 other patients with sporadic expression had de novo mutations (T178I; MIM *160270.0003), which was also found in DA2B; 2 patients had no recognized mutations.

== Diagnosis ==
Freeman–Sheldon syndrome is a type of distal arthrogryposis, related to distal arthrogryposis type 1 (DA1). In 1996, more strict criteria for the diagnosis of Freeman–Sheldon syndrome were drawn up, assigning Freeman–Sheldon syndrome as distal arthrogryposis type 2A (DA2A).

On the whole, DA1 is the least severe; DA2B is more severe with additional features that respond less favourably to therapy. DA2A (Freeman–Sheldon syndrome) is the most severe of the three, with more abnormalities and greater resistance to therapy.

Freeman–Sheldon syndrome has been described as a type of congenital myopathy.

In March 2006, Stevenson et al. published strict diagnostic criteria for distal arthrogryposis type 2A (DA2A) or Freeman–Sheldon syndrome. These included two or more features of distal arthrogryposis: microstomia, whistling-face, nasolabial creases, and 'H-shaped' chin dimple.

== Management ==
=== Surgical and anesthetic considerations ===
Patients must have early consultation with craniofacial and orthopaedic surgeons, when craniofacial, clubfoot, or hand correction is indicated to improve function or aesthetics. Operative measures should be pursued cautiously, with avoidance of radical measures and careful consideration of the abnormal muscle physiology in Freeman–Sheldon syndrome. Unfortunately, many surgical procedures have suboptimal outcomes, secondary to the myopathy of the syndrome.

When operative measures are to be undertaken, they should be planned for as early in life as is feasible, due to the affected children often having fragile health. Early interventions hold the possibility to minimise developmental delays and negate the necessity of relearning basic functions.

Due to the abnormal muscle physiology in Freeman–Sheldon syndrome, therapeutic measures may have unfavourable outcomes. Difficult endotracheal intubations and vein access complicate operative decisions in many DA2A patients, and malignant hyperthermia (MH) may affect individuals with FSS, as well. Cruickshanks et al. (1999) reports uneventful use of non-MH-triggering agents. Reports have been published about spina bifida occulta in anaesthesia management and cervical kyphoscoliosis in intubations.

=== Medical emphasis ===
General health maintenance should be the therapeutic emphasis in Freeman–Sheldon syndrome. The focus is on limiting exposure to infectious diseases because the musculoskeletal abnormalities make recovery from routine infections much more difficult in FSS. Pneumonitis and bronchitis often follow seemingly mild upper respiratory tract infections. Though respiratory challenges and complications faced by a patient with FSS can be numerous, the syndrome's primary involvement is limited to the musculoskeletal systems, and satisfactory quality and length of life can be expected with proper care.

== Prognosis ==
There are little data on prognosis. Rarely, some patients have died in infancy from respiratory failure; otherwise, life expectancy is considered to be normal.

== Epidemiology ==
By 1990, 65 patients had been reported in the literature, with no sex or ethnic preference notable. Some individuals present with minimal malformation; rarely patients have died during infancy as a result of severe central nervous system involvement or respiratory complications. Several syndromes are related to the Freeman–Sheldon syndrome spectrum, but more information is required before undertaking such nosological delineation.

== Research directions ==
One research priority is to determine the role and nature of malignant hyperthermia in FSS. Such knowledge would benefit possible surgical candidates and the anaesthesiology and surgical teams who would care for them. MH may also be triggered by stress in patients with muscular dystrophies. Much more research is warranted to evaluate this apparent relationship of idiopathic hyperpyrexia, MH, and stress. Further research is wanted to determine epidemiology of psychopathology in FSS and refine therapy protocols.

== Eponym ==
It is named for British orthopaedic surgeon Ernest Arthur Freeman (1900–1975) and British physician Joseph Harold Sheldon (1893–1972), who first described it in 1938.

== Notable individuals ==
Melissa Blake (writer) is a writer and disability advocate with Freeman-Sheldon syndrome.
