= Third Girl from the Left =

2005 novel by Martha Southgate

- Author: Martha Southgate
- Language: English
- Genre: Fiction
- Publisher: Houghton Mifflin
- Publication date: 2005
- Publication place: United States
- Media type: Print, eBook
- Pages: 272
- Awards: Black Caucus Award for Fiction
- ISBN: 0618470239
- OCLC: 58423233

Third Girl from the Left is a novel by American writer Martha Southgate, first published in 2005.

== Summary ==
The novel is divided into three sections, examining the lives of three generations of Edwards women.

=== Angela ===
In 1971, Angela Edwards runs away from the sheltered life she lived in Tulsa, Oklahoma to Hollywood in the hopes of becoming a movie star. Working as a playboy bunny, she manages to score bit parts in blaxploitation films through sexual favours. She also falls in love with her roommate Sheila, but while the two friends engage in a sexual relationship, they refuse to acknowledge that they are in love with each other and continue to pursue romantic relationships with men. Angela eventually falls in love with Rafe Madigan, another struggling actor.

By 1975 Angela is forced to realize that her chance of becoming a successful actress is fading. She accidentally becomes pregnant with Rafe's child and decides against having an abortion. Rafe tells her that he will not acknowledge the child and Angela is forced to return home to her parents. While there, Angela comes to the realization that the only place she can have her child is Los Angeles. She calls Sheila who tells her she can return and the two can raise her child together.

=== Mildred ===
In 1921, when Mildred, Angela's mother, is a young child, she witnesses her mother's violent murder at the hands of white men during the Tulsa race massacre. Unable to speak of the horrors she witnessed that day, Mildred grows into a quiet, risk-averse woman who nevertheless has a vivid and active imagination and finds it difficult to blend in with the church-going women of her community. Despite loving her three children she finds them difficult to raise. Mildred's one solace is the movie theatre Dreamland, which she visits regularly.

In the early 60s, Dreamland acquires a new projectionist from New York, William Henderson. William and Mildred fall in love and he shows her how the projection machine works and introduces her to the art of Jacob Lawrence. Their affair is discovered after Angela injures herself and Johnny Lee, Mildred's husband is called down to school to take care of her in Mildred's absence. Feeling as though she has disappointed her children, Mildred breaks off the affair and William leaves town, giving her a book he owned on Jacob Lawrence. Mildred is inspired by this to begin painting herself.

=== Tamara ===
Angela's daughter Tamara grows up being raised by Angela and Sheila, who still pretend to be roommates, but have long given up the hope of being successful movie stars. Angela continues the tradition her mother Mildred started by dragging her daughter along to movies and showing her the old blaxploitation films in which she appeared as a nude extra. Instead of wanting to be a star, Tamara falls in love with filmmaking. Inspired by Spike Lee, she attends film school in New York.

In film school, Tamara meets and falls in love with Colin Walsh, the only other black student at school. Unlike Tamara, Colin is from a wealthy family and the class differences between them grow greater as they begin to work on their thesis films. In order to help Tamara, who has no budget, Colin shoots her movie for free and ends up accidentally destroying her project by shooting the whole thing slightly out of focus. The two break up.

When she is 29, Tamara is contacted by her mother, who tells her that her grandmother, Mildred, is sick. Tamara goes to Tulsa and meets the member of her family for the first time. Her interest in filmmaking is resurrected and she begins to shoot footage of her grandmother, Mildred, talking about the Tulsa race massacre.

== Pop culture references ==
The title references the fictional Angela's credit in the film Coffy starring blaxploitation star Pam Grier.

Mildred goes to see Carmen Jones six times in one week.

Tamara works for Law & Order.

== Adaptations ==
In 2013, it was announced that a film adaptation of the novel, set to star Kerry Washington and Viola Davis, was in pre-production.
