= Rosie Hewlett =

English author (born 1995)

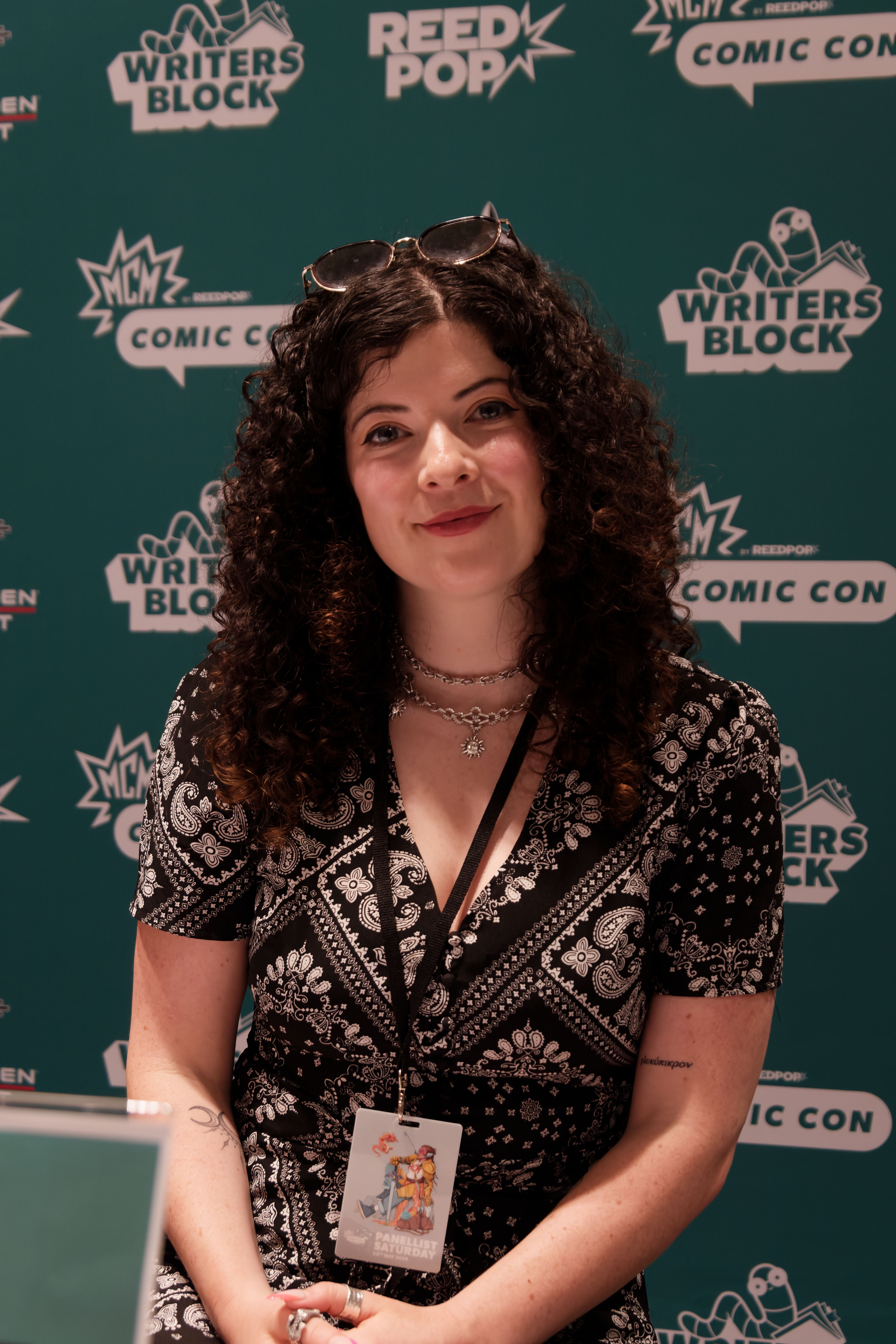
- Hewlett at the 2026 MCM London Comic Con
- Born: Rosie Beth Hewlett; 12 May 1995 (age 31)
- Education: University of Birmingham
- Years active: 2020–present
- Awards: International Rubery Book Award; Alex Award
- Website: www.rosiehewlett.com

Rosie Beth Hewlett (born 12 May 1995) is an English author. Her Greek mythology retellings Medusa (2021) and Medea (also known as The Witch of Colchis, 2024) were Sunday Times bestsellers and won the International Rubery Book Award and an Alex Award respectively.

== Early life and education ==
Hewlett attended Wycombe High School. She graduated with a degree in Classical Literature and Civilisation from the University of Birmingham.

== Career ==
Via SilverWood Books, Hewlett published her debut novel Medusa in 2021. Medusa won the International Rubery Book Award. In 2025, Medusa was republished in hardback, becoming a Sunday Times bestseller.

In December 2022, Transworld acquired the rights to publish Hewlett's second novel Medea in March 2024 via the imprint Bantam Press. Medea debuted at #1 on The Sunday Times bestseller list in the Hardback Fiction category. It also had a U.S. release under the title The Witch of Colchis in September 2024, which won an Alex Award. Alexandra Alter of The New York Times identified Hewlett's Medea as part of a trend of feminist Greek mythology retellings.

== Personal life ==
Hewlett lives in West Malling, Kent.

== Works ==
- Medusa (2021)
- Medea (2024) (also known as The Witch of Colchis)
- Sweetbitter Song (2026)
