= Debra Magpie Earling =

American author (born 1957)

- Born: August 3, 1957 (age 69); Spokane, Washington
- Education: University of Washington; MA in English, MFA in Fiction Writing, Cornell University
- Occupations: Novelist; short story writer; University of Montana English professor
- Writing career
- Notable awards: Spur Award for Best Novel of the West (2003)

Debra Cecille Magpie Earling (born August 3, 1957 in Spokane, Washington) is a Native American novelist, and short story writer. She is a member of the Bitterroot Salish (tribe). She is the author of Perma Red and The Lost Journals of Sacajewea, which was on display at the Missoula Museum of Art in late 2011. Her work has also appeared in Ploughshares, the Northeast Indian Quarterly, and many anthologies.

== Education and career ==
At 18, Earling became the first public defender in the Tribal Justice System of the Flathead Indian Reservation in Montana. She is a graduate of the University of Washington, and holds both an MA in English (1991) and an MFA in Fiction Writing (1992) from Cornell University.

Earling is currently a faculty member in the English Department at the University of Montana at Missoula. In 2016, she became the first Native American director of the University of Montana's creative writing program. She teaches Fiction and Native American Studies.

== Works ==
=== Perma Red ===
Earling's first novel, Perma Red, takes place on the Flathead Indian Reservation in the 1940s. Louise White Elk, a determined and beautiful young woman, dreams of escaping and belonging. She comes of age as she is pursued by three dangerous men who will do anything to possess her—police officer Charlie Kicking Woman, the charismatic Baptiste, and Harvey Stoner, who owns nearly everything around him.

This novel won a Spur Award and Medicine Pipe Bearer Award for best first novel from the Western Writers Association, a WILLA Literary Award and the American Book Award. Perma Red touches on the still prevalent crisis of missing and murdered indigenous women in Montana and throughout the West. A team of indigenous and women filmmakers are adapting Perma Red for TV. “Native women need to tell their own stories. Now is the time for those stories to rise. Perma Red is only the beginning," Earling is stated as saying on the fundraising page for the adaptation.

=== The Lost Journals of Sacajewea ===
This work first began as a project during the bicentennial of the Lewis and Clark expedition and is the result of a five year collaboration between Debra Magpie Earling and artist Peter Koch. The writings are done by Earling, as Koch compiled the historical photographs. The writings, along with the photographs, hope to illustrate native women’s longstanding struggle and desire for freedom through Sacajewea.

=== Anthologies ===
- William Kittredge; Annick Smith, eds. (1991). The Last Best Place: A Montana Anthology. University of Washington Press. ISBN 978-0-295-96974-9.
- Craig Lesley; Katheryn Stavrakis, eds. (1991). Talking Leaves: Contemporary Native American Short Stories. Delta. ISBN 978-0-385-31272-1.
- Kim Barnes; Mary Clearman Blew, eds. (2001). Circle of Women: Anthology of Western Women Writers. University of Oklahoma Press. ISBN 978-0-8061-3367-6.
- Sue Thomas, ed. (1994). Wild women: contemporary short stories by women celebrating women. Overlook Press. ISBN 978-0-87951-514-0.
- Caroline Patterson, ed. (2006). "Bad Ways". Montana Women Writers: A Geography of the Heart. Farcountry Press. p. 196. ISBN 978-1-56037-405-3.
- Allen Morris Jones; William Kittredge, eds. (2004). "Real Indians". The Best of Montana's Short Fiction. Globe Pequot. p. 127. ISBN 978-1-59228-269-2.
- Alvin M. Josephy, ed. (2007). "What We See". Lewis and Clark Through Indian Eyes. Random House, Inc. p. 26. ISBN 978-1-4000-7749-6.

== Awards ==
- In January 2019, Perma Red was voted Montana's Best Loved Novel beloved by Montanans through “The Great Montana Read“ program, headed by Montana PBS and Montana Public Radio.
- 2007 Guggenheim Fellow
- 2003 American Book Award
- 2003 WILLA Literary Award
- 2006 NEA grant

== Reviews ==
Debra Magpie Earling's debut novel Perma Red was well reviewed in January Magazine.
