= Gods with a Little G =

2019 novel by Tupelo Hassman

- First edition
- Author: Tupelo Hassman
- Language: English
- Genre: Bildungsroman
- Publisher: Farrar, Straus and Giroux
- Publication date: 2019
- Publication place: United States
- Media type: Print
- Pages: 288
- ISBN: 978-0-374-16446-1

Gods with a Little G is a 2019 novel written by Tupelo Hassman about a teenage girl's coming-of-age in a religious town.

== Synopsis ==
Teenager Helen, known by the nickname "Hell", is still dealing with her mother's recent death from cancer. Along with two new teens at her school, siblings Winthrop and Rainbolene, she clashes with the religious fundamentalists who control her small California town.

== Background ==
Author Hassman said she feels more comfortable living in larger cities, where one can be anonymous. She cited being "slightly terrified" of small towns as the reason for the novel's setting. She also wanted to highlight how intolerance can occur anywhere, including California. The first character to come to her was Rainbolene, a transgirl. Hassman wanted to explore the love and acceptance that Rainbolene and her brother, Win, feel for each other. Helen came from a desire to have a character witness this.

== Reception ==
Ayana Mathis of The New York Times wrote that the novel is engaging but lacks a major arc for Helen. Although praising Helen as funny and insightful, Mathis said she seems like an outside observer who reacts to events that happen to other people. Publishers Weekly called it a "charming and funny" novel that "honestly and strikingly encapsulates the teenage experience". Michael Schaub of NPR wrote that it is a heartwarming story that "brilliantly evokes the feeling of being a teenager". Writing for The Washington Post, Bethanne Patrick called the plot familiar but said that it is well-written and will leave readers wanting a sequel.
