= Sara Nović =

American writer

- Born: 1987 (age 38–39)
- Education: Columbia University (MFA)
- Occupations: Writer; translator; professor
- Writing career
- Notable works: Girl at War (2015); True Biz (2022)
- Website: sara-novic.com

Sara Nović (born 1987) is an American writer, translator, and professor. Nović is also a deaf rights activist who has written about the challenges she faces as a deaf novelist. Nović is most known for their debut novel, Girl at War.

== Early life and education ==
Nović grew up between the United States and Croatia.

She is a graduate of the MFA program at Columbia University, where she studied fiction and literary translation.

== Career ==
Nović has translated poems by Bosnian writer Izet Sarajlić. Nović was awarded the Willis Barnstone Translation Prize in 2013 for their translation of Sarajlić's poem "After I Was Wounded". In 2014, Nović was awarded a Travel Fellowship by the American Literary Translators Association.

Nović's debut novel, Girl at War, was published by Random House in 2015. The book tells the story of Ana Jurić, a ten-year-old girl whose life is upended by the civil war that resulted in the dissolution of Yugoslavia. The novel was an Alex Award recipient in 2016. It was longlisted for the Women's Prize for Fiction and a finalist for the Los Angeles Times Book Prize.

In 2019, Nović released the nonfiction project America is Immigrants, illustrated by Alison Kolesar. It was published by Penguin Random House as an e-book.

Nović's second novel, True Biz, was released in 2022. The book follows protagonist Charlie to the River Valley School for the Deaf, where she deals with a faulty cochlear implant and meets other deaf people for the first time in her life. The book was a Reese's Book Club pick and was reviewed as "moving, fast-paced and spirited [...] but also skillfully educational" by The New York Times. The novel integrates excerpts from Wikipedia pages and other sources to offer educational content about American Sign Language and Deaf culture and history.

Nović is a fiction editor at Blunderbuss Magazine and serves as the founding editor of the deaf rights blog Redeafined.

Nović teaches creative writing and Deaf studies at Emerson College and Stockton University.

Her memoir, Mother Tongue, was released in May 2026. The book received a starred review from Publishers Weekly, which described the book as "Lucid and rigorously researched, Nović’s memoir offers a powerful critique of the systems that have marginalized deaf Americans across the decades. It’s a sobering must-read." It was a finalist for the 2026 National Book Award for Nonfiction.

== Personal life ==
Nović uses they and she pronouns and lives in Philadelphia.

== Publications ==
=== Novels ===
- Girl at War. Random House. 2015. ISBN 9780812996340.
- True Biz. Random House. 2022. ISBN 9780593241509.

=== Nonfiction ===
- Mother Tongue: A Memoir. Random House. 2026. ISBN 9780593241530.
