= The Taste of Salt =

2011 novel by Martha Southgate

- First edition
- Author: Martha Southgate
- Language: English
- Publication date: 2011

The Taste of Salt is a novel by Martha Southgate first published in 2011 by Algonquin Books.

== Summary ==
=== Part one ===
The first part of the novel is narrated by Josie Henderson, an African-American marine biologist who is picking her younger brother Edmund "Tick" Henderson up from rehab. This event causes her to reflect back on her parents marriage. Her mother, Sarah, and father, Ray met in 1969. Despite their difference in education they married and had two children, but Ray's failure to become a writer eventually took a toll on him and he gradually became an alcoholic. Part one ends with Sarah asking Ray to leave the family home when their children are teenagers.

=== Part two ===
In the second part of the novel Tick struggles with his recovery. He is able to regain his job with the Cleveland Cavaliers but is forced to do menial work until he can be trusted again. He eventually relapses and loses his job and his home as his mother throws him out.

Meanwhile Josie begins an affair with her new co-worker, Ben Davidson, who is the only other black person in her department. Josie feels close to Ben because they have the same race and socio-economic background, but when she offers to leave her husband for him, he declines and Josie is left feeling alone and bereft.

=== Part three ===
In the final section of the book Tick finds his way to Woods Hole, Massachusetts where Josie lives. Josie and her husband Daniel take Tick in but he is unwilling to go to Alcoholics Anonymous meetings and the relationship between brother and sister becomes strained. Eventually, after making it to a meeting, Tick realizes that he no longer has a desire to recover. After breaking his sobriety he swims out into the ocean where he drowns.

Josie returns home with Tick's body. While both her marriage and her relationship with her lover Ben are over, and her brother is dead, Josie is able to reconnect with her father, Ray.

== Reception ==
The Taste of Salt received mixed reviews with some calling it "minor-key melancholy," " a minor contribution," and lacking "the depth you might expect from an author like Southgate."
