= Ernest Arthur Freeman =

English orthopaedic surgeon

- Born: 20 September 1900; Streatham, London
- Died: 14 September 1975 (aged 74); Wolverhampton, West Midlands, England
- Education: Westminster City School
- Alma mater: University of London
- Occupation: Orthopaedic surgeon
- Known for: Freeman–Sheldon syndrome
- Spouse: Joan Mary Fisher Horrell (m. 1950)
- Children: 2

Ernest Arthur Freeman FRCS (20 September 1900 – 14 September 1975) was an English orthopaedic surgeon.

Freeman received his secondary education at Westminster City School. In the last few weeks of World War I, he was conscripted and served as a private in the Queen's Royal Regiment (West Surrey).

== Medical career ==
With his ex-serviceman's grant he entered St Bartholomew's Hospital Medical School in 1919 as a student at the University of London. In 1925 he qualified with MRCS, LRCP. In 1927 he graduated with MB BS (Lond.) and qualified with FRCS.

While employed at St Bartholomew's Hospital, he completed after house appointments and served as a junior demonstrator in pathology. He joined George Gask's professorial unit as a third assistant in a team consisting of Thomas Peel Dunhill, Geoffrey Keynes, and James Paterson Ross.

Arriving in Wolverhampton, West Midlands in 1931, he was appointed to the Royal Hospital, Wolverhampton and became senior surgeon in fractures and orthopaedics. He was also on the staff of the Guest Hospital in Dudley, Bridgnorth Infirmary, Brosley and Wenlock Hospitals and Patshull Rehabilitation Clinic.

In 1940, in the treatment of war casualties, he became associated with Patshull, which through his endeavours became a very active rehabilitation centre. When wounded soldiers began to arrive, Freeman founded an orthopaedic unit at Wordsley Hospital in Dudley.

Freeman in 1938 described the eponymous Freeman–Sheldon syndrome. The foot deformities involved in two paediatric cases of the syndrome were brought to Freeman's attention for possible surgical correction. Freeman consulted with Joseph Harold Sheldon, who was an expert on diseases of bone, to help with the two medical cases.

== Personal life ==
Freeman married Joan Mary Fisher Horrell (1912–2006) in Wolverhampton in 1950.

He died on 14 September 1975 in Wolverhampton, West Midlands. Upon his death, he was survived by his widow, a son, and a daughter.

== Selected publications ==
- wit E. A. Freeman: Freeman, E. A.; Sheldon, J. H. (July 1938). "Two Cases of Cranio-Carpo-Tarsal Dystrophy of? Undescribed Type". Proc R Soc Med. 31 (9): 1116–1119. doi:10.1177/003591573803100946. PMC 2076962. PMID 19991612.
