= Sharp Teeth =

2007 novel by Toby Barlow

- First edition
- Author: Toby Barlow
- Cover artist: Natasha Michaels
- Language: English
- Genre: Horror; Werewolf fiction
- Publisher: HarperCollins
- Publication date: 2007
- Publication place: United States
- Pages: 312
- ISBN: 0-06-143022-6

Sharp Teeth is a 2007 novel in free verse by American writer Toby Barlow. It won the 2009 Alex Award and is the Horror entry on the 2009 Best Adult Genre Fiction Reading List.

== Plot summary ==
Three packs of shapeshifters struggle to survive in Los Angeles. The shapeshifters describe each other as dogs, and ordinary humans who notice them, see them as large dogs: normally inconspicuous, but sometimes improbably intelligent and dangerous. Early on, the book's narrative voice is at pains to separate the shapeshifter dogs from the traditional werewolf:

So get this straight
it's not the full moon.
That's as ancient and ignorant as any myth.

The nature of the shapeshifter dogs leads them to organize in packs with a specific structure; but from that starting point each pack develops in a distinctly different direction depending on the strategy the pack chooses to masquerade as humans in human society. Sharp Teeth explores how those strategies succeed or fail as the packs stumble across each other and as ordinary humans stumble across the shapeshifters.

The novel's point of view shifts among many characters, shapeshifter and ordinary human alike, all striving to act upon incomplete information about each other to pursue their very different objectives. The unifying thread of the novel is the protagonist Anthony, who opens the novel as a newly hired dog-catcher, scrambles through successive encounters with the other characters and (unlike many of them) survives, to close the novel as a shapeshifter dog.

== Characters ==
- Lark is the leader of one of the packs.
- "She" is the main female character. She is never explicitly named.
- Anthony is new to the dog-catching business and eventually falls for the unnamed female character.
- Peabody is the cop that investigates the disappearance of Anthony's boss and is drawn into the dangerous games being played.

== Critical reception ==
- Kaite Mediatore Stover of Booklist, "[a]s spicy as a taco, as relentless as the pounding surf, and as lulling as a moon-drenched beach, Barlow's hip werewolf saga is highly recommended for adults and YAs who just don't get all the fuss about Stephenie Meyer's Twilight Series."
- Jackie Cassada of Library Journal, "[w]ritten in a free verse style that perfectly complements the action as it moves from slower-paced narratives to short, jagged scenes of graphic violence and heartbreak, this groundbreaking work commands attention from a wide audience, including genre fans and modern fiction aficionados."
- Matthew Moffett of School Library Journal, "[s]ome readers might be initially intimidated by Barlow's free-verse poetry, but, after a page, they will be swept into the rhythm. It's also to Barlow's credit that the touching moments between the woman and Anthony work as powerfully as the most graphic violence in the story. The dark humor and grim story line will immediately draw in fans of other neo-horror novels..."
