= Aryn Kyle =

American novelist and short story writer (born 1978)

- Born: January 22, 1978 (age 48); Peoria, Illinois, U.S.
- Education: Colorado State University; University of Montana (MFA)
- Occupations: Novelist; short story writer
- Writing career
- Notable work: The God of Animals (2007)
- Notable awards: National Magazine Award (2004, 2022); Rona Jaffe Foundation Writers' Award (2005); Pacific Northwest Booksellers Association Award (2008); Alex Award (2008); Spur Award for Best Novel of the West (2008)
- Website: www.arynkyle.com

Aryn Kyle (born January 22, 1978) is an American novelist and short story writer. She is a 2008 recipient of the Alex Awards.

== Life ==
Kyle was born in Peoria, Illinois and grew up in Grand Junction, Colorado. She graduated from Colorado State University in 2001 and received an MFA in fiction from the University of Montana in 2003.

Kyle’s first short story, “Foaling Season”, was published by The Atlantic Monthly and went on to win a 2004 National Magazine Award in fiction.

“Foaling Season” became the first chapter of Kyle’s debut novel, The God of Animals, which was published by Scribner in March 2007 and became a national bestseller.

The God of Animals is the story of Alice Winston, a young girl coming of age on her family’s rundown horse ranch. The novel is set in the fictional town of Desert Valley, which Kyle based on Grand Junction, Colorado. The God of Animals won an Alex Award, a Spur Award for Best Novel of the West and was named by Amazon.com as the Number One Fiction Debut of 2007.

Kyle has had short stories published in The Atlantic Monthly, Ploughshares, The Georgia Review, The Alaska Quarterly Review, StoryQuarterly, and in the anthologies Best New American Voices 2005, and Best American Short Stories 2007. Her short story collection, Boys and Girls Like You and Me, was released by Scribner in the spring of 2010.

== Work ==
=== Novels and collections ===
- The God of Animals (2007)
- Boys and Girls Like You and Me (2010)

=== Short stories ===
- "Copper Queen" from The Georgia Review
- "Nine" from The Atlantic Monthly
- "Foaling Season" from The Atlantic Monthly
- "Femme" from The Georgia Review
- "Allegiance" from Ploughshares
- "Brides" from Best New American Voices 2005
- "The Company of Strangers" from The Alaska Quarterly Review
- "Little Deaths" from StoryQuarterly
- "Employee/Manager Relations" from Conversely.com

== Awards ==
- National Magazine Award, 2004, 2022
- Rona Jaffe Foundation Writers' Award, 2005
- Pacific Northwest Booksellers Association Award, 2008
- Mountains & Plains Independent Booksellers Association Award, 2008
- American Library Association Alex Award, 2008
- Spur Award for Best Novel of the West, 2008
