= Velma Maia Thomas =

American author

Reverend Velma Maia Thomas
- Born: 18 June 1955 (age 71); Detroit, Michigan, United States
- Education: Howard University, Emory University, Georgia State University.
- Writing career
- Genre: Non-fiction
- Notable works: Lest We Forget: The Passage from Africa to Slavery and Emancipation
- Notable awards: Alex Award (1998)
- Website: velmamaiathomas.com

Reverend Velma Maia Thomas (born June 18, 1955) is an author and academic from the United States of America.

== Background ==
Thomas was born June 18, 1955, in Detroit, Michigan. She received her bachelor's degree (journalism) from Howard University and master's degree (political science) from Emory University. She also holds a graduate certificate in Heritage Preservation from Georgia State University.

Thomas is an ordained minister at the Church of the Black Madonna in Atlanta.

== Career ==
Thomas's work focuses on African American history, specifically slavery and emancipation in context of the United States of America.

From 1987 to 2000 Thomas worked at the Shrine of the Black Madonna Bookstore and Cultural Center in Atlanta. Here she created the Black Holocaust Exhibit, a collection on slavery in America.

=== Works ===
From her work on the Black Holocaust Exhibit, Thomas published four interactive books on slavery and emancipation in the United States entitled:

- Lest We Forget: The Passage from Africa to Slavery and Emancipation (1997, Random House)
- Freedom's Children: The Passage from Emancipation to the Great Migration (2000, Random House)
- No Man Can Hinder Me: The Journey from Slavery to Emancipation Through Song (2001, Random House)
- We Shall Not Be Moved (2002, Random House)

Thomas also co-authored Emancipation Proclamation: Forever Free with Kevin McGruder (2013) and was a contributor to Leroy Barber's book Red, Brown, Yellow, Black, White? Who's More Precious In God's Sight? (2013).

Thomas was selected as one of a hundred distinguished Americans to contribute to the book Lift Every Voice and Sing: A Celebration of the Negro National Anthem (2000) She also contributed a chapter to Albert Cleage Jr. and the Black Madonna and Child (2016) and provided the introduction to Finding A Place Called Home: A Guide to African-American Genealogy and Historical Identity (1999).

Thomas has contributed to various academic journals, notably the publication of The Odd Fellow City: The Promise of a Leading Black Town in the Journal of the Georgia Association of Historians.

In 2012, Thomas was an expert and commentator for the PBS documentary, Underground Railroad: The William Still Story.

Thomas has served as a distinguished scholar at the Penn Center in South Carolina and once served on the faculty of the University of South Carolina Beaufort.

=== Awards ===
Thomas's first book, Lest We Forget, received an Alex Award in 1998 from the American Library Association. Freedom's Children was a finalist for the 2000 Georgia Writer of the Year Award for Young Adult Books. We Shall Not Be Moved received the 2003 Outstanding Contribution to Publishing Citation Award from the Black Caucus of the American Library Association.

In 2004 she won the Award for Excellence in Research Using the Holdings of An Archives from the Georgia Historical Records Advisory Board.
