= Lisa Lutz =

American author (born 1970)

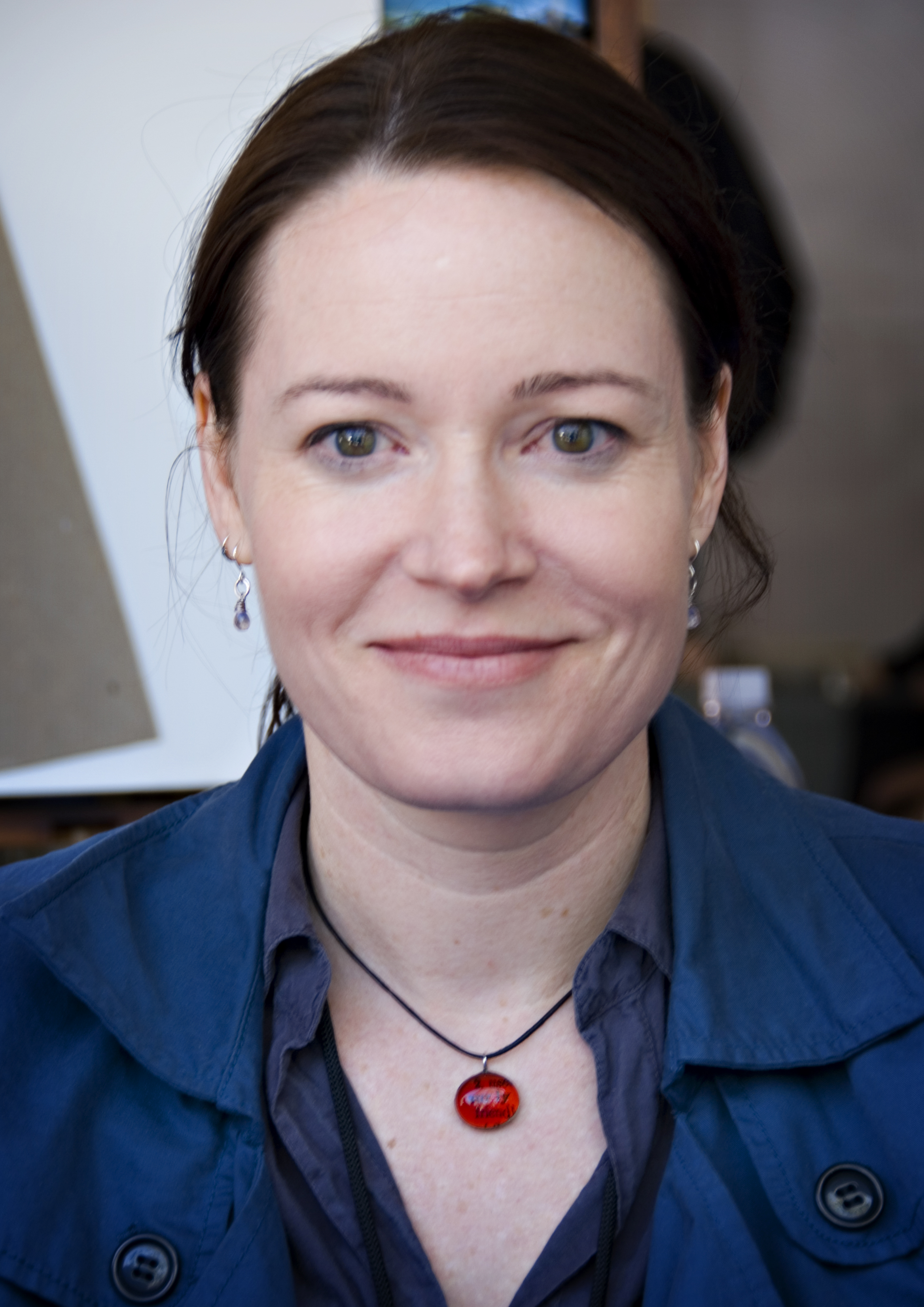
- Lisa Lutz
- Born: March 13, 1970 (age 55); Southern California, U.S.
- Occupation: Author

Lisa Lutz (born March 13, 1970) is an American author. She began her career writing screenplays for Hollywood. One of her rejected screenplays became the basis for a popular series of novels about a family of private investigators, the Spellmans. She is a 2020 recipient of an Alex Award.

== Biography ==
Lutz was born in Southern California in 1970. She attended UC Santa Cruz, UC Irvine, University of Leeds in England and San Francisco State University, all without attaining a degree. During the 1990s she had many low-paying jobs, including work in a private investigation firm, and spent a lot of time writing and re-writing a Mob comedy called Plan B. Her screenplay was optioned in 1997, and was made into a movie in 2000 (released in 2001). Variety Magazine described the movie as "torturously unfunny." She subsequently produced several other tentative screenplays, but none were picked up. Her final effort, tentatively titled "The Spellman Files", was also rejected. At that point, Lutz realized that "the story really needed more space to be told properly," and decided to write it as a novel. She began the novel while still living in California in 2004, then decided to move into a relative's family vacation home in upstate New York to work on it full-time. She returned to Seattle to write her second Spellman novel, then moved to San Francisco, where she lived until 2012. She presently lives in a remote area of upstate New York.

== Writing ==
Her novel series describes the Spellmans, a family of private investigators, who, while very close knit, are also intensely suspicious and spend much time investigating each other. The first book in the series, The Spellman Files, becomes suspenseful when 14-year-old Rae Spellman is apparently kidnapped.

In 2008, The Spellman Files was nominated for three awards for best first novel, the Anthony Award, Macavity Award, and Barry award; was awarded an Alex Award; was nominated for a Dilys Award; and reached #27 on the New York Times Bestseller List

Paramount Pictures optioned the film rights for the novel, with Laura Ziskin producing and Barry Sonnenfeld directing. On October 18, 2010, the film talks failed and a television series was being developed for ABC with Lutz consulting on Greg Yaitanes & Katie Lovejoy's proposed adaptation.

Her second novel, Curse of the Spellmans, was nominated for a 2009 Edgar Award by the Mystery Writers of America for best mystery novel. Lutz went on to write four more entries in the Spellman series: Revenge of the Spellmans (2009), The Spellmans Strike Again (2010), Trail of the Spellmans (2012), and The Last Word, also released as The Next Generation (2013). In addition to the six Spellman novels, Lutz wrote Isabel Spellman's Guide to Etiquette: What is Wrong with You People (2013), a short tongue-in-cheek self-help guide purportedly written by Lutz's series protagonist, and How to Negotiate Everything (2013), a children's book purportedly written by Lutz's series character David Spellman, with illustrations by artist Jaime Temairik.

In 2011, Simon & Schuster published Heads You Lose, a stand-alone comic crime novel written by Lutz with her friend and former romantic partner David Hayward.

Lutz's second stand-alone, How to Start a Fire, was published in 2015 by Houghton Mifflin Harcourt. A thriller, The Passenger, was published in 2016 by Simon & Schuster.

== Published works ==
=== Screenplays ===
- Plan B (2001)
- Dare Me (TV series), Season 1, Episode 5, "Parallel Trenches" (2020)

=== Novels ===
- The Spellman Files (2007)
- Curse of the Spellmans (2008)
- Revenge of the Spellmans (2009)
- The Spellmans Strike Again (2010)
- Heads You Lose (with David Hayward) (2011)
- Trail of the Spellmans (2012)
- The Last Word, later published as "Spellman Six: The Next Generation" (2013)
- How to Start a Fire (2015)
- The Passenger (2016)
- The Swallows (2019)
- The Accomplice (2022)

=== Children's Book ===
- "How To Negotiate Everything" by David Spellman and Lisa Lutz, with illustrations by Jaime Temairik (2013)

=== Articles or other contributions ===
- Please Stop Talking I have to use the Bathroom (Friction magazine, 2 December 2002 issue)
- Confessions of a Hollywood sellout (salon.com, February 2005)
- Rule 1: Ignore Rules (The Wall Street Journal, 18 February 2012 issue)
- Ask Lutz ("Need unprofessional advice? Ask Lutz" - blogs posted on lisalutz.com from 2002 to 2004)
- How to write a Fan Letter Without Getting a Restraining Order (a chapter in the 2005 book "Don't Forget to Write for the Secondary Grades: 50 Enthralling and Effective Writing Lessons (Ages 11 and Up))"
- Isabel Spellman's Guide to Etiquette: What is Wrong with You People by Isabel Spellman and Lisa Lutz, e-book only (2013)
