= Tweed's Magazine =

- Founded: 2011
- Country of origin: United States
- Headquarters location: Brooklyn, New York
- Publication types: Magazines

The Coffin Factory Inc. is a not-for-profit organization devoted to the arts. The organization was founded by Randy Rosenthal and Laura Isaacman in 2011 and is based in Brooklyn, New York. The first production of The Coffin Factory, Inc. was a literary magazine called The Coffin Factory. Billed as "the magazine for people who love books," The Coffin Factory produced five issues with work representing over 30 countries. It typically featured fiction and essays by respected literary figures, interviews with publishing houses or authors, and art/photographs. Each issue contained one story from a relatively unknown writer, known as the "Market Fresh" selection.

Tweed's magazine of literature & art is the second project from The Coffin Factory, Inc. This literary magazine is published twice a year, with the first issue scheduled to be released in March, 2014.

The magazine also has an online blog, which posts interviews, book reviews, fiction, and essays throughout the week.

== Reception ==
Reviews for The Coffin Factory often highlight the high literary tastes of the magazine's editors. The Rumpus wrote of the magazine: “The Coffin Factory publishes writing that appeals to the folks who spend all their free time roaming around bookstores, clicking through literary blogs, and tinkering away at their own writing projects. These are the people who will love this magazine.” Similarly, The Library Journal wrote: "This 'magazine for people who love books' distinguishes itself in the quality of its short fiction and illustrations. New works by mostly established writers include many in translation, giving Coffin Factory a distinctly international vibe. Many of the illustrations are depictions of new works currently on display in a gallery. All this gives Coffin Factory a classy freshness sure to be enjoyed by anyone who appreciates contemporary arts and literature."

Writer Joyce Carol Oates called the magazine "A brilliantly imagined, highly readable, and important new literary magazine with the most incongruous title."
