= Toby Barlow =

American author

Toby Barlow is an author born in Philadelphia and raised in Chevy Chase, Maryland, and New England. He attended Westtown School, and St John’s College in Santa Fe, New Mexico.

== Career ==
After working at Hal Riney & Partners, TBWA Chiat\Day, and J Walter Thompson, Barlow moved to Detroit in 2006 and became the creative director of WPP subsidiary GTB for the Ford Motor Company account. As a part of the marketing team under Alan Mulally and Jim Farley’s leadership, Barlow worked on campaigns for Ford through 2008-2012. He launched the “Drive One” campaign followed by the global “Go Further” campaign that was credited with helping turn the brand around.

In 2006, Harper’s published his novel Sharp Teeth. New York Magazine described it as a "tightly written crime thriller." In 2012, FSG published his novel Babayaga, a book about witches and spies in 1959 Paris that Kirkus Review called "decidedly odd and most entertaining."

In 2018, Barlow co-founded Lafayette American, a marketing and design agency. The 40 person shop has won a Gold Effie, Cannes Lion, D&AD Pencil and an AdAge Small Agency of the Year Award. Their clients have included Amazon, Mazda, Netflix, Google, and Ford.

== Personal life ==
He is the son of the politician Tom Barlow. He has two daughters, Nora and Carolina Barlow, a comedian, producer and podcaster.
