= The Particular Sadness of Lemon Cake =

2010 novel by Aimee Bender

- First edition
- Author: Aimee Bender
- Audio read by: Aimee Bender
- Language: English
- Genre: Fiction
- Publisher: Doubleday
- Publication date: 2010
- Publication place: United States
- Media type: Print, ebook, audio
- Pages: 292 pages
- ISBN: 0385501129 First edition hardcover

The Particular Sadness of Lemon Cake is a 2010 novel by Aimee Bender. The story is about a young girl, Rose Edlestein, who has the ability to taste the emotions of a person through the food they make. The novel comes forth with its magical realism that reflects the writer’s general commentary on her own storytelling in a 2010 interview, in which the writer maintains that “For me, the goal is to capture some kind of feeling or experience that I cannot articulate for myself any other way. In order to get at that feeling, I want to use whatever tool I can. And often, looking at it through the shimmer of metaphor or a skewed vision is, paradoxically, a more direct way for me to think about or articulate something about an experience. … For me, magical storytelling becomes a way to make concrete something."

== Plot ==
The night before Rose's ninth birthday, Rose eats a piece of the cake her mother, Lane, baked for the occasion and realizes that she can taste her mother's emotions in the cake; while Lane attests that she is happy, Rose can taste otherwise. With the help of George, her wunderkind older brother Joseph's only friend, Rose comes to comprehend that, through tasting something somebody has made, she can detect the emotions of its creator of which the creator does not themselves realize they feel, as well as the precise details of a food's source and manufacturing.

One day, Rose eats of a pie that Lane baked and is so overwhelmed with emotion that she collapses to the floor. Lane rushes Rose to the ER where, distressed, she demands that her tongue be removed. Realizing once and for all that her condition will not be taken seriously and that any proclamations of suffering from it will cause people to believe she is insane, Rose suppresses her distress and tries to avoid her mother's cooking as much as is possible, sustaining herself primarily with processed foods.

At around 12, Rose deduces, after eating her mother's roast beef, that her mother is having an affair with her coworker, Larry. Around the same time, Joseph begins disappearing; he vanishes seemingly into thin air on several occasions, only to reappear moments later, visibly exhausted, but otherwise unharmed. Despite his genius, Joseph doesn't get into any of the colleges he applies to and, after some convincing, agrees to attend Los Angeles City College. His parents allow him to get an apartment nearby, where he lives alone, upon his insistence.

A few months later, when Joseph neglects to call his mother at the scheduled time, Rose goes to check on him and finds him face down on the floor in the kitchen, nearly unconscious. He is rushed to the hospital, where he is treated for, among other things, extreme dehydration. A couple of years later, after he once again neglects to contact Lane while she is away on a work trip, Rose checks on Joseph at Lane's behest. Rose finds Joseph's bed in the hallway and has to force herself inside by breaking the chain lock. In Joseph's bedroom, Rose comes across a curious sight: Joseph is sitting on a chair, and it appears as though the leg of his chair is disappearing into his shoe as if it is his own. Rose briefly leaves the room to find a phone and finds that Joseph is gone when she returns. A distressed Rose confides in George, with whom she shares a brief romantic moment.

Rose graduates high school and, rather than going to college, decides to stay home and take a job at an office. She attends George's wedding, starts seeing one of her coworkers, and gets a job as a dishwasher at the only restaurant with food that she can eat. One night, Rose finds her father looking at an old photo album and sees that there is a piece of cloth tied over her grandfather's face in one of the pictures. Her father reveals that her grandfather wore this, as he had the ability to smell other people's emotions, and reveals that his own aversion to hospitals is related to a hunch that he would somehow find it unbearable; Rose realizes that her trait is somehow genetic and that Joseph's disappears as a result of, and to escape the consequences of, the variation of his ability. Joseph eventually returns and is hospitalized again; correctly sensing that he will not return, Rose makes him promise to disappear into a certain chair so that she will always know that he is inhabiting it.

Rose learns to embrace her ability and uses it to train as a chef at the restaurant and to assist a counsellor who works with teens.

== Publication history ==
The Particular Sadness of Lemon Cake was first published hardback in June 2010 through Doubleday, alongside an e-book edition and audiobook narrated by the author. A paperback edition was released through Anchor Books the following April.

== Reception ==
Jane Ciabattari of NPR reviewed The Particular Sadness of Lemon Cake, calling it "high-hearted and soulful".

Anna Scott of The Guardian concluded it is a "quirky, engaging tale".

Susan Salter Reynolds of The Los Angeles Times also reviewed the work, concluding that it was "this century’s version of noir, or maybe it’s the opposite of noir", noting that "it’s about daily life that is increasingly impossible to navigate yet moving always forward."
