= Gregory Galloway =

American fiction writer (born 1962)

- Born: 1962 (age 63–64); Keokuk, Iowa, U.S.
- Education: Keokuk High School; Iowa Writers' Workshop (MFA)
- Occupation: Writer
- Writing career
- Genre: Fiction

Gregory Galloway (born 1962) is an American fiction writer. His first novel, As Simple as Snow, was released by Putnam in 2005. Though the book was meant for an adult audience, it has taken off with teen readers.

== Biography ==
The son of a juvenile probation officer, Gregory Galloway was born and raised in the small, southeastern Iowa town of Keokuk, located near the confluence of the Des Moines and Mississippi Rivers. The idea of writing presented itself to Galloway while he was in the throes of adolescence at Keokuk High School.

Galloway later graduated with MFAs in both fiction and poetry from the Iowa Writer's Workshop at the University of Iowa, in Iowa City. He worked at a downtown record store while attending college, a job driven by his longstanding interest in music.

His interest in music played a pivotal role in As Simple as Snow, a mystery about a highly intense and intelligent Goth teenager, Anastasia Cayne, who goes missing in the middle of winter. The only clue to her disappearance is a dress left outstretched like an arrow near a hole in an icy river and a cryptic tape she leaves for the unnamed male narrator. The novel is draped in codes and clues that leave the reader speculating what will come of the relationship between Anna and the narrator.

His second novel, The 39 Deaths of Adam Strand, which follows a summer in the life of a boy named Adam Strand, who, no matter how hard he tries, cannot die, was published by Dutton in February 2013.

Galloway currently lives in Hoboken, New Jersey, with his wife.

== Books ==
- (2005) As Simple as Snow. Penguin Publishing Group. ISBN 0-399-15231-8.
- (2011) Careful & Other Stories
- (2013) The 39 Deaths of Adam Strand. Penguin Young Readers Group. ISBN 9781101592984
- (2021) Just Thieves. Melville House Publishing. ISBN 9781612199375

== Awards ==
- The 2006 Alex Awards from the American Library Association
