= Bart Yates =

American novelist

Bart Yates is an American novelist, from Iowa City, Iowa. He also writes under the pen name of Noah Bly.

== Novels ==
- The Brothers Bishop
- The Distance Between Us
- Leave Myself Behind
- White Creek: A Fable
- The Language of Love and Loss
- The Very Long, Very Strange Life Of Isaac Dahl

And writing as Noah Bly:

- The Third Hill North Of Town
