= As Simple as Snow =

2005 novel by Gregory Galloway

- Author: Gregory Galloway
- Language: English
- Genre: Young adult fiction, Mystery
- Publisher: Putnam’s
- Publication date: 2005
- Publication place: United States
- Media type: Print Hardcover
- Pages: 320pp
- ISBN: 978-0-399-15231-3

As Simple As Snow (2005) is a mystery novel by Gregory Galloway. It tells the story of a high-school aged narrator who meets a Gothic girl, Anna Cayne. Through postcards, a shortwave radio, various mix-CDs, and other erratic interests, Cayne eventually wins the heart of the narrator. However, a week before Valentine's Day, she goes missing, leaving only a dress on the ice and secret codes to help the narrator and the reader find out where she has gone.

== Overview ==
In a labyrinth of art, magic, cryptic codes and young love, the author presents a coming-of-age novel that seems designed to puzzle readers of all ages. Moreover, it is an adolescent's quest to unravel the clues his girlfriend may have left behind after her mysterious disappearance.

The young narrator goes unnamed throughout the novel. He disparages himself initially as embarrassingly bland and inexperienced. His new girlfriend Anastasia (Anna) Cayne is instead presented as a complicated high school goth girl with a penchant for riddles and affectionate mind games. Anna spends much of her time creating obituaries for every living person in town and introducing the narrator to a wider landscape of art, music and literature. She is unlike anyone the narrator has ever known and soon finds himself enveloped in a world of Houdini tricks, strange art, covert messages, and ghost stories – although her past remains an even bigger mystery.

But a week before Valentine's Day, Anna disappears, leaving behind nothing except a trail of mysterious clues and a string of unanswered questions. Determined to find Anna, the narrator turns amateur detective in order to piece together the elements of the preceding months. Soon the fragments of events, conversations, and letters (and new messages that continue to arrive) coalesce into haunting and surprising revelations about friends, family and especially about Anna Cayne. Perhaps these revelations will solve the puzzle of Anna's disappearance, whether her own invention, or something more sinister.
