= Scott Stambach =

American author and professor of physics (born 1980)

Scott Stambach (born June 10, 1980) is an American author and professor of physics. His novel The Invisible Life of Ivan Isaenko was published in 2016 and was nominated for the 2018 Dublin Literary Award. Stambach also collaborates with Science for Monks, an international organization working to build science programs in Tibetan monasteries. In 2017, the book also won an Alex Award from the American Library Association. That same year, Popsugar named the book on its list of "7 Captivating Books For Fans of Grey's Anatomy".
