= The Death of Bees =

Novel by Lisa O'Donnell

- First edition (UK)
- Author: Lisa O'Donnell
- Language: English
- Publisher: Heinemann (UK); Windmill Books (US)
- Publication date: 2 January 2013
- Publication place: United Kingdom
- Media type: Hardcover, paperback, e-book
- Pages: 304 pages
- ISBN: 0099558424

The Death of Bees is a 2013 debut novel by Lisa O'Donnell. The book was published on 2 January 2013, in the United Kingdom and United States by Windmill Books. Told through multiple viewpoints, and written in the present tense, The Death of Bees focuses on how the death of two local drug addicts affects their daughters Marnie and Nelly and the people around them. The novel won the 2013 Commonwealth Book Prize (Canada and Europe region).

== Plot ==
After Marnie discovers the dead bodies of her parents, she and her sister decide against reporting the deaths to the police and instead bury their bodies. Reporting the death would mean social services stepping in and placing them in foster care. The sisters' lie about the disappearance of their parents is initially believed because their parents are considered unreliable drug addicts by many in the community. This lie is eventually uncovered by their homosexual neighbor Lennie, who takes them in and cares for them. Despite Lennie's care and kindness, Marnie and Nelly are both haunted by the ghosts of their past. Nelly wakes up screaming in the night because of memories of her father molesting her while Marnie drowns her sorrows by drinking, selling drugs, and sleeping with a married man. When their maternal grandfather discovers the situation and insists on taking the two girls in, Lennie becomes intent on keeping them by his side.

== Reception ==
Critical reception for the book was positive, with The Scotsman praising the book. The Herald called the book "hard to put down" while Publishers Weekly also praised the book but found Nelly to be a "less believable character".

== Recognition ==
- 2012 Anobii First Book Award, nominated for The Death of Bees
- 2013 Commonwealth Book Prize, overall winner for The Death of Bees
- 2014 Alex Award
