= ArtsBridge =

ArtsBridge is a university scholarship program in the United States created by Lawrence University president Jill Beck in April 1996 when she was dean of the Claire Trevor School of the Arts at the University of California, Irvine. She brought together groups of local elementary pupils to receive arts training from UCI arts majors. It was designed to attract public and private funding to support scholarships for top arts graduate and undergraduate students who commit themselves to teaching their speciality to one or more classes of K-12 pupils in local schools.

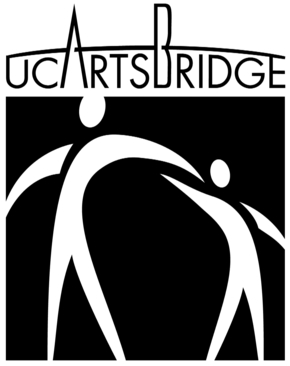
ArtsBridge logo 1998, at the time of expanding throughout UC campuses
