= Educating Esmé =

1999 non-fiction book by Esmé Raji Codell

Educating Esmé: Diary of a Teacher's First Year
- Author: Esmé Raji Codell
- Language: English
- Genre: Non-fiction, education
- Publisher: Algonquin Books of Chapel Hill
- Publication date: 1999
- Publication place: United States
- Media type: Print, e-book
- Pages: 205
- ISBN: 1-56512-225-9
- OCLC: 40193499
- Dewey Decimal: 372.11/0092 21
- LC Class: LB2844.1.N4 C63 1999

Educating Esmé: Diary of a Teacher's First Year is a book written by children's literature specialist and elementary school teacher Esmé Raji Codell. The book, presented in diary format, recounts Codell's first year teaching in an inner-city public school in Chicago; her joys, trials and experiences. The book was originally published in 1999.
