= Martha Southgate =

American novelist and essayist (born 1960)

- Born: December 12, 1960 (age 65); Cleveland, Ohio, U.S.
- Education: Smith College; Goddard College
- Occupations: Novelist and essayist
- Notable work: Third Girl from the Left

Martha Southgate (born December 12, 1960) is an American novelist and essayist best known for her novel Third Girl from the Left (2005). Her work has appeared in The New York Times Magazine, O, Premiere, and Essence.

== Early life ==
Southgate was born in Cleveland, Ohio. She attended Smith College, before obtaining an MFA in creative writing from Goddard College.

== Writing career ==
Southgate's novel Another Way to Dance, which tells the story of a 14-year-old Black aspiring ballerina, was published in 1996 by Delacorte Press. In 1997, the novel won the Coretta Scott King John Steptoe Award for New Talent.

In 2002, Southgate released The Fall of Rome: A Novel, set in a New England private boys boarding school.

Her third novel, Third Girl from the Left, was published in 2005.

Southgate's most recent novel, The Taste of Salt, was published in 2011 by Algonquin Books.

== Adaptations ==
In 2013, plans for an adaptation of Southgate's novel Third Girl from the Left were announced. Actresses Kerry Washington and Viola Davis were attached to star.

== Works ==
- Another Way to Dance (1996)
- The Fall of Rome: A Novel (2002)
- Third Girl from the Left (2005)
- The Taste of Salt (2011)
