= Stammbach =

- Municipality
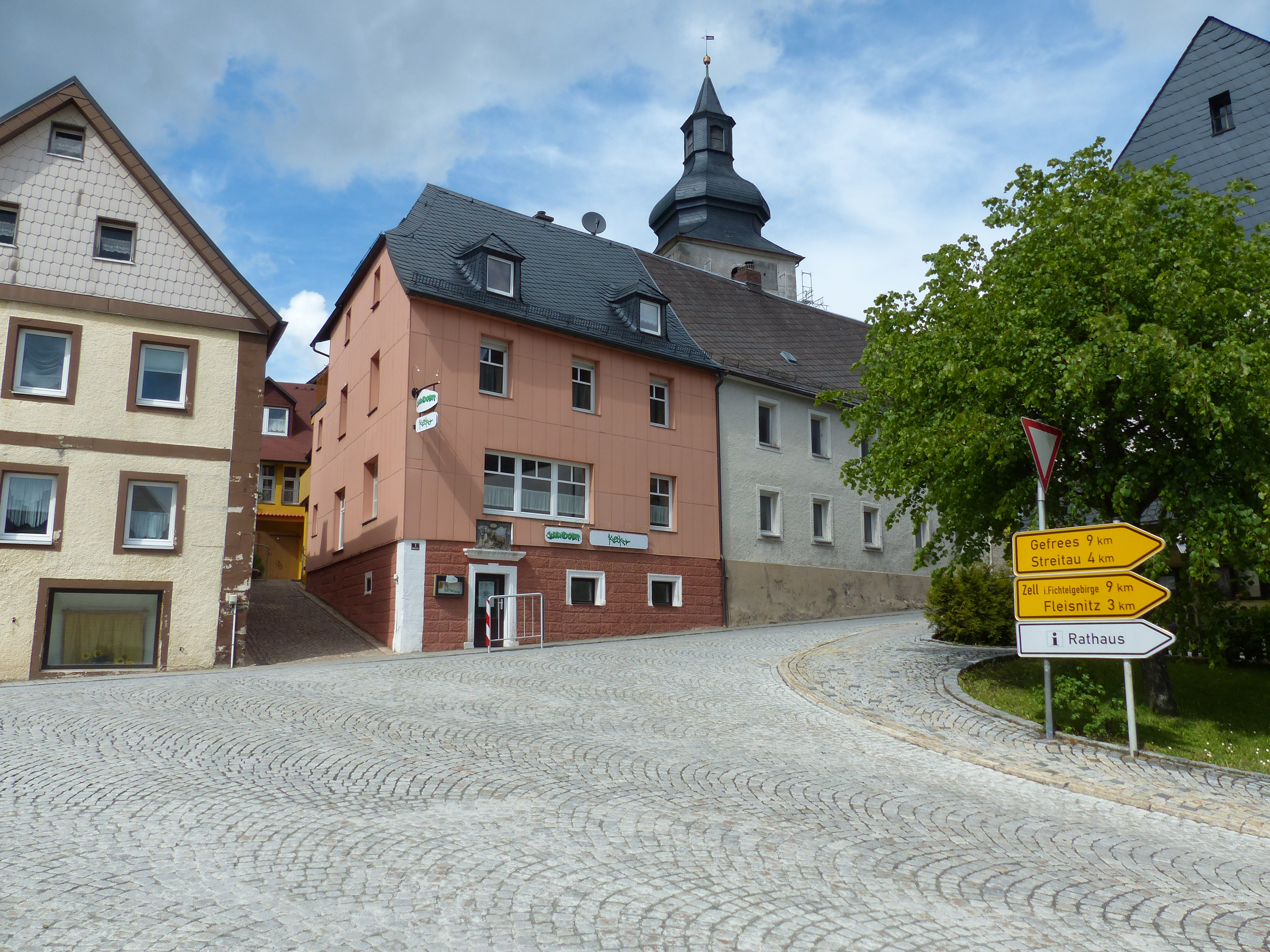
- Center of the town

- Coat of arms

- Location of Stammbach within Hof district
- Interactive map of Stammbach
- Location within Germany Location within Bavaria
- Coordinates: 50°15′N 11°40′E
- Country: Germany
- State: Bavaria
- Admin. region: Oberfranken
- District: Hof
- Subdivisions: 23 Ortsteile

Government
  - Mayor (2020–26): Karl Philipp Ehrler (CSU)

Area
  - Total: 34.67 km^{2} (13.39 sq mi)
- Elevation: 550 m (1,800 ft)

Population (2025-12-31)
  - Total: 2,317
  - Density: 66.83/km^{2} (173.1/sq mi)
- Time zone: UTC+01:00 (CET)
  - Summer (DST): UTC+02:00 (CEST)
- Postal codes: 95236
- Dialling codes: 09256
- Vehicle registration: HO
- Website: www.stammbach.de

Stammbach (German pronunciation: [ˈʃtambax]) is a market town and municipality in the district of Hof in Bavaria in Germany.
