= David Zimmerman (writer) =

American author

David Zimmerman is an American author originally from Georgia. His first novel, The Sandbox, about an American soldier stationed in Iraq, was published in 2010. His work has been reviewed by the Los Angeles Times as an "adroit" depiction of conditions for soldiers in Iraq and by The New York Times. His work has been discussed in The Dallas News, has received a starred review from Publishers Weekly and was reviewed by Booklist as a portrayal of "both the eternal verities of war as well as the stark differences that each war imposes on the young who do the fighting". Currently, he is an English professor in Ames, Iowa. He taught creative writing in spring 2016 at Iowa State University.

== Education ==
Zimmerman attended Emerson College for film studies and went on to earn an MFA in creative writing at the University of Alabama.

== Career ==
He has worked as a publicist at St. Martin’s Press in New York City and taught writing at Georgia Southern University, Dilla University College in Ethiopia, South College in Savannah and the University of Wisconsin–Madison, where he was also a fiction fellow at the Wisconsin Institute of Creative Writing.

== Works ==
- Socket (2002) ISBN 978-1895636420
- The Sandbox (2010) ISBN 978-1-56947-628-4
- Caring is Creepy (2012) ISBN 978-1569479773
