= Andrew Welsh-Huggins =

American journalist and author

Andrew Welsh-Huggins is an American author of fiction and nonfiction books about crime. He is a former journalist. He graduated from Kenyon College.

He is the author of the Andy Hayes series of mystery novels, featuring a former Ohio State Buckeyes quarterback working as a private investigator.

Welsh-Huggins was legal-affairs reporter for the Associated Press in Columbus, Ohio.

== Books ==
=== Non-fiction ===
- No Winners Here Tonight: Race, Politics, and Geography in One of the Country's Busiest Death Penalty States (2009) Ohio University Press.
- Hatred at Home: Al-Qaida on Trial in the American Midwest (2011) Ohio University Press.

== Fiction ==
- Fourth Down and Out: An Andy Hayes Mystery (2014) Swallow Press
- Slow Burn: An Andy Hayes Mystery (2015) Swallow Press
- Capitol Punishment: An Andy Hayes Mystery (2016) Swallow Press
- The Hunt: An Andy Hayes Mystery (2017) Swallow Press
- The Third Brother: An Andy Hayes Mystery (2018) Swallow Press
- Fatal Judgment: An Andy Hayes Mystery (2019) Swallow Press
- The End of the Road (2023) Mysterious Press
- Sick to Death: An Andy Hayes Mystery (2024) Swallow Press
- The Mailman (2025) Mysterious Press
