= Pattenburg, New Jersey =

Populated place in Hunterdon County, New Jersey, US

- Unincorporated community
- Location of Pattenburg in Hunterdon County Inset: Location of county within the state of New Jersey Pattenburg, New Jersey (New Jersey) Pattenburg, New Jersey (the United States)
- Coordinates: 40°38′10″N 75°00′59″W
- Country: United States
- State: New Jersey
- County: Hunterdon
- Township: Union
- Elevation: 453 ft (138 m)
- GNIS feature ID: 879167

Pattenburg is an unincorporated community located within Union Township in Hunterdon County, in the U.S. state of New Jersey.

The Norfolk Southern Railway's Lehigh Line (formerly the mainline of the Lehigh Valley Railroad), runs through Pattenburg and Lehigh Line's south entrance to the Pattenburg Tunnel is located in Pattenburg.

== Notable people ==
People who were born in, residents of, or otherwise closely associated with Union Township include:

- Scott Bradlee (born 1981) is an American musician, pianist, and arranger, best known as founder of Postmodern Jukebox as well as composer and arranger for several television programs including the Tony Awards.
- Daniel Karcher (born 1964) is an on-air broadcast announcer and film designer, best known as host for WBGO and production of The Blair Witch Project and Family Guy.
- John "Liver-Eating" Johnson, born John Jeremiah Garrison Johnston (July 1, 1824 – January 21, 1900) was a mountain man of the American Old West and the inspiration for the film Jeremiah Johnson (1972) starring Robert Redford.
