= Alan Swallow =

American writer

- Born: February 11, 1915; Powell, Wyoming
- Died: November 27, 1966 (aged 51); Denver, Colorado
- Occupations: Professor; Publisher
- Years active: 1940-1966
- Known for: Establishing the Swallow Press and being director of the University of Denver Press

Alan Swallow (February 11, 1915 – November 27, 1966) was an American professor of English who created his own publishing imprint, Swallow Press, and worked as editor and director of the University of Denver Press.

== Early life ==
Born in Powell, Wyoming in 1915 to Edgar A. Swallow and Alta Helen (Myers) Swallow, Swallow attended Powell Grade School and, during the summer before his senior year in high school, he worked as a tourist operator for Yellowstone National Park just outside of Gardiner, Montana. it was during this time period that he learned about Emanuel Haldeman-Julius and his Little Blue Book publications. This served as an inspiration for Swallow's later decision to found his own publishing company. His early love for poems also resulted in him releasing several of his pieces in the Powell student newspaper, the Powwow, along with managing a column for several years.

Obtaining an honor scholarship for college thanks to placing first in his high school class, he went on to receive his Bachelor of Arts from the University of Wyoming in 1937. He then earned an additional fellowship scholarship to attend Louisiana State University where he completed a Master of Arts in 1939 and a Doctorate of English in 1941. His dissertation was on the subject of "Methods of Poetic Composition in Early English Renaissance, Skelton to Sidney". During his graduate years, his mentor in writing and poetry was Robert Penn Warren, along with being mentored by Cleanth Brooks.

== Career ==
Near the end period of receiving his doctorate, Swallow began working as a part of the New Mexico Quarterly before directly attending the University of New Mexico as an instructor until 1942. It was during this period that he began the Swallow Press imprint and conducted publication activities on his own accord. After his two-year stint at the university, he moved to acting as an assistant professor for English classes at Western State College from 1942 to 1943. From 1943 to 1945 he served as a sergeant during the end years of World War II.

Returning to academic life in 1946, Swallow began a new assistant professorship at the University of Denver, becoming associate professor in 1948. The period of 1947 through 1953 saw him acting as director of the University of Denver Press, alongside setting up the university's creative writing doctoral program with John Edward Williams. In late 1949, Swallow purchased Denver's The Author & Journalist magazine with three friends. Swallow co-edited with David Raffelock. Swallow's group controlled the magazine from the January 1950 through September 1951 issues. Swallow retired from his teaching efforts in 1954 to put his focus entirely on his expanded publishing businesses. In his later years, he was a member of the Western Writers of America and Denver Westerners. He was vice chairman of the Colorado branch of the American Civil Liberties Union from 1961 to 1962 and chairman from 1963 to 1964.

=== Swallow Press ===
First founded in March 1940, Swallow Press originally focused on publishing poetry and literary fiction. The first simple publication, done on an old handpress and some purchased type fonts, was an anthology of pieces written by fellow students in Swallow's mentor group and titled Signets: An Anthology of Beginnings. Some of the press's later and more well-known publications included several short novels by Janet Lewis, several novels by Anaïs Nin, and the final three books in Vardis Fisher's Testament of Man series. Authors of poetry were also a major focus of the publisher, focusing on individuals that would otherwise not find publication. The imprint also published authors through the magazine Swallow had begun in his sophomore year of university called Sage, and through it he introduced local Western authors to print, including works by Muriel Sibell Wolle. The final book that Swallow was involved in publishing was Frank Waters' The Woman at Otowi Crossing, a story about the life of Edith Warner. After Swallow's death, his imprint began working with Ohio University in 1979 and obtained a financial licensing agreement to enable Swallow Press to reissue several of the aforementioned works. The Ohio University Press fully acquired the imprint in 2008, along with rights to use the Swallow name in future publications.

== Awards and honors ==
As a part of the 25th anniversary of creating the Swallow Press, Swallow was given a special program in 1965 honoring his work at the Solomon R. Guggenheim Museum and hosted by the Academy of American Poets.

== Personal life ==
During his senior year in high school, his sister Vera brought over a friend named Mae Elder. This meeting would eventually lead to their marriage during his early university years on June 20, 1936. Swallow died on November 27, 1966, at the age of 51 due to a heart attack.

A biography of Swallow's life titled The Imprint of Alan Swallow was published in October 2010 by Syracuse University Press and written by W. Dale Nelson.

== Works ==
- Swallow, Alan (1946). The remembered land: A book of poems. Prairie City, Illinois: The Press of James A. Decker. LCCN 47023749. OCLC 6341081. OL 38817505W.
