= Mountain Man (novel) =

1965 novel by Vardis Fisher

- First edition (publ. William Morrow)
- Author: Vardis Fisher
- Language: English
- Publication date: 1965

Mountain Man is a 1965 novel written by Vardis Fisher. Set in the mid-1800s United States, it tells the story of Sam Minard, a hunter/trapper living and wandering throughout Montana, Wyoming and Idaho. The book is separated into three parts: Lotus, Kate and Sam. The novel is largely a fictionalized retelling of the experiences of the real mountain man Liver-Eating Johnson. According to biographer Dorys C. Grover, Warner Brothers filmed an adaptation of Mountain Man in 1972, released as Sydney Pollack's Jeremiah Johnson.

== Synopsis ==
In "Lotus", Sam stumbles upon the grisly scene of an Indian massacre. A lone woman is left alive, mourning the deaths of her two sons and daughter, and the kidnapping and scalping of her husband. Sam helps the distraught woman bury her dead and even builds her a cabin, putting the word out to other "mountain men" to watch over her and supply her with necessities of life. Sam takes a wife from the Flathead Indian tribe, eschewing her difficult Indian name in favor of the name Lotus. Lotus becomes pregnant, and Sam leaves her at his cabin for the winter months, unwilling to subject his pregnant wife to the rigors of sleeping outdoors while he plies his trade of trapping for furs. Upon returning to the cabin in spring, Sam finds his little family had been slaughtered just 10 days before his return. The sign left by the murderers indicates that members of the Crow tribe are responsible, and Sam sets out on a path of vengeance, vowing to kill every member of the tribe that killed his family.

The story focuses on the lives of mountain men, those who have forsaken big city living in favor of the harsher, more violent, yet to them more rewarding lives spent communing freely with nature.
