= John Milius =

American screenwriter and director (born 1944)

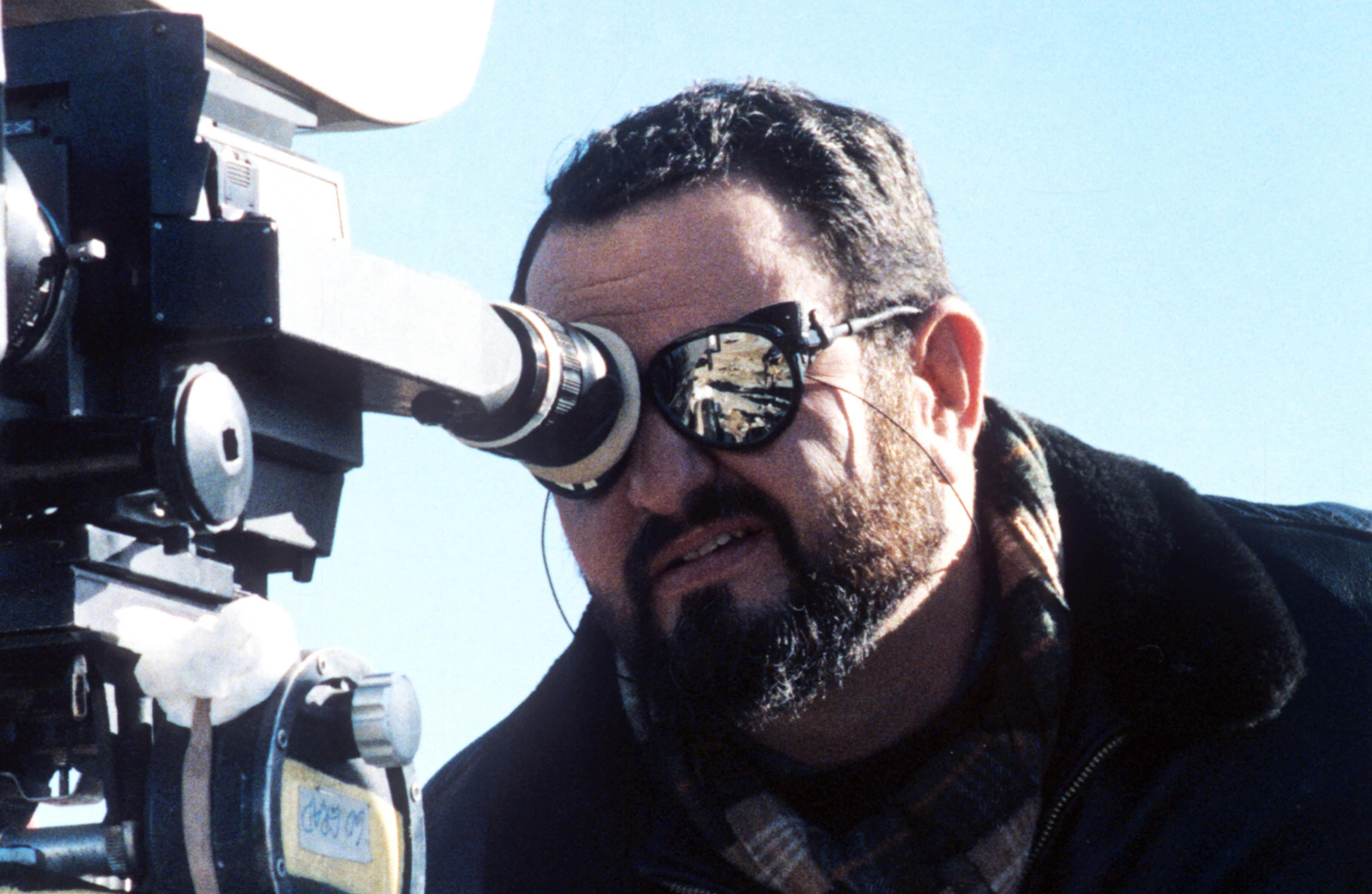
- Milius in 1981
- Born: John Frederick Milius; April 11, 1944 (age 82); St. Louis, Missouri, U.S.
- Education: USC School of Cinema-Television
- Occupations: Screenwriter; director
- Years active: 1966–present
- Spouses: Renee Fabri (m. 1967; div. 1978); Celia Kaye (m. 1978, divorced); Elan Oberon (m. 1992)
- Children: 3
- Awards: Bronze Wrangler for Theatrical Motion Picture; 1972 Jeremiah Johnson; 1993 Geronimo: An American Legend

John Frederick Milius (/ˈmɪliəs/; born April 11, 1944) is an American filmmaker. He is considered a major figure of the New Hollywood era.

He rose to prominence in the early 1970s for writing the scripts for The Life and Times of Judge Roy Bean (1972), Jeremiah Johnson (also 1972), and the first two Dirty Harry films. He made his directorial debut with the film Dillinger (1973), followed by The Wind and the Lion (1975) and Big Wednesday (1978). In 1980, he was nominated for the Academy Award for Best Adapted Screenplay for Apocalypse Now, which he co-wrote with Francis Ford Coppola.

During the 1980s, Milius established himself as a director of action and adventure films, with Conan the Barbarian (1982) and Red Dawn (1984). He was also a sought-after script doctor. He later served as the co-creator of the Primetime Emmy Award-winning television series Rome (2005–2007).

Off-screen, Milius is known for his eccentric personality and libertarian political views, variously and contradictorily self-described as a "Zen anarchist", "right-wing extremist", and "Maoist". He served as a director of the National Rifle Association of America (NRA). Milius is also one of the creators of the Ultimate Fighting Championship (UFC), he helped to create the octagon-shaped cage, and his association helped provide interest and investors to the startup UFC.

== Early life and education ==
Milius was born April 11, 1944, in St. Louis, Missouri, the youngest of three children to Elizabeth Marie (née Roe; 1906–2010) and William Styx Milius (1889–1975), who was a shoe manufacturer. When Milius was seven, his father sold Milius Shoe Company, which his grandfather George W. Milius had founded in 1923, and retired. He moved the family to Bel Air, California. John Milius became an enthusiastic surfer. At 14, his parents sent him to a small private school, the Lowell Whiteman School, in the mountains of Steamboat Springs, Colorado, because he "was a juvenile delinquent".

Milius became a voracious reader and started to write short stories: "I had learned very early, to write in almost any style. I could write in fluent Hemingway, or in fluent Melville, or Conrad, or Jack Kerouac, and whatever." He says he was also influenced by the oral story telling of surfers at the time, who had a beatnik tradition.

"My religion is surfing", Milius said in 1976, adding that "the other thing that influenced me throughout my youth was my involvement with things Japanese. I studied judo, kendo, and painting. I felt more comfortable with things Japanese and with Japanese people than I did with Europeans ... feudalism in any country, at any period, fascinates me ... I understand the reasoning of people in Asia, it makes sense to me. Zen is very sensible, the whole way of feeling things is logical, whereas many of the Western-motivated things—greed, business sense—I'm not comfortable with, I don't understand their rationale."

Milius says he attempted to join the Marine Corps and volunteer for Vietnam War service in the late 1960s, but was rejected due to a "chronic" and "sometimes disabling" case of mild asthma. "I'd have given anything to be a Marine", said Milius. "As a surfer I'd spent a lot of time hanging out with the Marines off Pendleton, and I'd had every intention of joining up ... I was devastated, I felt like I'd been rejected as a human being." "It was totally demoralizing", he said later. "I missed going to my war. It probably caused me to be obsessed with war ever since." Milius said he was "dying to be able to ... go prove myself in battle—the same as all young men long to do, if they are honest with themselves, whether it's right or wrong or even sane, which is a debate that's been going on since we left the caves. Only there was no way I could found my own unit, so I did the second best, which was to write it. Every writer wishes he could actually be doing the thing he writes about." He later admitted, "I don't know how well I'd have done. I really wanted a military career, to be a general, but I had a hard time polishing shoes. And marching. I was in the ROTC once, and I hate marching ... I would have been good in the Mexican Army."

At one stage Milius considered becoming an artist or historian. During a rainy day on a summer vacation in Hawaii in 1962, he stumbled upon a movie theatre showing a week of Akira Kurosawa films and fell in love with cinema.

Milius studied film at the University of Southern California School of Cinema-Television, which he chose because it was an elitist school that trained people for Hollywood. His classmates included George Lucas, Walter Murch, Basil Poledouris, Randal Kleiser and Donald F. Glut. Milius says he was influenced by his teacher, Irwin Blacker:

He gave you the screenplay form, which I hated so much, and if you made one mistake on the form, you flunked the class. His attitude was that the least you can learn is the form. "I can't grade you on the content. I can't tell you whether this is a better story for you to write than that, you know? And I can't teach you how to write the content, but I can certainly demand that you do it in the proper form." He never talked about character arcs or anything like that; he simply talked about telling a good yarn, telling a good story. He said, "Do whatever you need to do. Be as radical and as outrageous as you can be. Take any kind of approach you want to take. Feel free to flash back, feel free to flash forward, feel free to flash back in the middle of a flashback. Feel free to use narration, all the tools are there for you to use."

Milius says his writing style was influenced by two novels in particular, Moby-Dick and On the Road:

I think Moby Dick is the best work of art ever made ... I used to point out the dramatic entrance of characters, how they were threaded through ... Moby Dick was a perfect screenplay, a perfect example of the kind of drama that I was interested in. Another great influence on me was ... On the Road, which has no tight, linear narrative, but sprawls, following this character. Moby Dick and On the Road are completely different kinds of novels, yet they're both extremely disciplined. Nothing happens by accident in either of those two books.

Milius reflected his "ambitions stopped at B Westerns ... I thought that was a good life. I never wanted to be Hitchcock or some big mogul, I didn't want to be Louis B. Mayer. I wanted to be ... Budd Boetticher or something ... John Ford." His short films at film school included The Reversal of Richard Sun (1966), Glut (1967) and Viking Women Don't Care (1967). He wrote a documentary, The Emperor (1967), directed by classmate George Lucas, who also edited an animated short Milius directed called Marcello, I'm So Bored (1967) with John Strawbridge.

Marcello, Milius's thesis film, won best animation at the National Student Film Festival and screened around the country in various festivals; it was praised by Vincent Canby of The New York Times. Milius received a job offer to work in animation but he turned it down as he could not see himself "sitting there drawing cell after cell."

== Career ==
=== Early ===
Milius's first completed script was Los Gringos (1968). "It actually wasn't bad", he later said. "It was sort of like The Wild Bunch ... there was a lot of killing and shooting and riding and dust ... sombreros. ... It was a pretty good idea, actually. It had everything, and it was certainly as original as The Wild Bunch, but it wasn't as skillfully written as later stuff."

He followed this with The Last Resort which was optioned by Michael S Laughlin in 1969. Milius says, "Neither of them were ever made, but I was able to option them. I had them rented out for like $5,000 a year."

==== The Devil's 8 ====
Milius then got a summer job working at the story department of American International Pictures through a student colleague of his who had begun working there, Willard Huyck. Huyck and Milius worked at AIP under producer Larry Gordon, reading scripts. They eventually collaborated on a rewrite of the screenplay for The Devil's 8 (1968), an action drama about moonshine drivers which ripped off The Dirty Dozen (1968).

Milius's name had been mentioned in a 1968 Time magazine article about the new generation of Hollywood filmmakers, which also referred to George Lucas and Martin Scorsese. This was read by Mike Medavoy, who became Milius's agent. Medavoy called Milius "a badboy mad genius in a teenager's body, but he was a good and fast writer with original ideas."

Milius began to get writing commissions. He wrote a script entitled The Texans for Al Ruddy at Paramount, a contemporary version of Red River (1948) (never made, although Sam Peckinpah was going to direct it in 1979)— Milius later said it "wasn't very good". He also wrote an original called Truck Driver (aka The Haul) which was purchased by Levy-Garner-Laven, although that film too was not made.

Milius later said he "didn't do a good job" with these two early scripts "because in both cases I was influenced by the people who had hired me. They said put this in and put that in, and I went along with it. Every time I went along with something in my whole career it usually didn't work. Usually there's a price to pay. You think of selling out, but there is a price to pay. Usually what people want you to do is make it current."

==== Jeremiah Johnson ====
Milius then wrote Jeremiah Johnson, a story loosely based on the life of the mountain man Liver-Eating Johnson.

Milius later said this was "the real breaking point" where he knew "almost overnight ... that I had become a good writer with a voice.":

I knew that material. I'd lived in the mountains, I had a trapline, I hunted, and I had a lot of experiences with characters up there. So, it was real easy to write that and there was a humor to it, a kind of bigger-than-life attitude. I was inspired by Carl Sandburg. I read a lot of his poetry and it's this kind of abrupt description—"a train is coming, thundering steel, where are you going? Wichita." That great kind of feeling that he had, that's what I was trying to do there. I remember there was a great poem about American braggarts. You know, American liars—"I am the ring-tailed cousin to the such and such that ate so and so and I can do this and I can do that better than Mike Fink the river man ..." I just realized that this was the voice that the script had to have. It was as clear as a bell. I knew that writing was particular to me.

Milius sold the script to Warner Bros. in 1970 for $5,000, going up to $50,000 if it was ever made. Warner Bros. had other writers work on the original script based on The Crow Killer. Milius was also called back to work on it, and his fee grew each time. (He eventually made $90,000 on the film.) Eventually, Robert Redford agreed to play the lead and Sydney Pollack signed to direct.

==== Dirty Harry and Judge Roy Bean ====
Milius wrote an uncredited draft of Dirty Harry (1971). He says his contribution to the film was "A lot of guns. And the attitude of Dirty Harry, being a cop who was ruthless. I think it's fairly obvious if you look at the rest of my work what parts are mine. The cop being the same as the killer except he has a badge. And being lonely." Dirty Harry was an enormous box office hit.

George Hamilton hired Milius to rewrite Evel Knievel (1971), a biopic of the stunt rider, at a fee of $1,000 a day. Milius re-did the entire script over seven days.

He wrote an original script, The Life and Times of Judge Roy Bean, about the famous judge. He offered it for $150,000 if he could direct, but could find no takers. He sold it to First Artists for $300,000, then extremely high for a script. Directed by John Huston and starring Paul Newman, it was a moderate hit, although Milius disliked the final result. "I fought every day", he said. "And I was blooded well. I was treated horribly." More popular was Jeremiah Johnson.

Milius did some work with David Giler on the script which became The Black Bird.

By now Milius was one of the most sought after screenwriters in Hollywood, seen as a colorful character with a talent for lively interviews. His self-styled "Zen Anarchist"/"American samurai" persona made him stand out in Hollywood. For instance, he rewrote Dirty Harry only on the condition that he be given an expensive gun. He was also one of the inspirations for the character of John Milner in the enormously successful American Graffiti (1973). Milius said of this film, "I guess he [Lucas] saw me in that light because I was a surfer going past my time."

He also wrote the first draft of the Dirty Harry sequel, Magnum Force (1973). Milius later said "I don't like Magnum Force. Of all the films I had anything to do with, I like it least. They changed a lot of things in a cheap and distasteful manner." It was however successful at the box office.

==== Dillinger ====
Milius wanted to move behind the camera. "Being a director is the only way anyone will listen to you in Hollywood", he said. "It's the next best thing to being a star."

Gangster films were popular at the time and AIP offered him the chance to direct one if he would write it for a fraction of his regular fee. Milius agreed and wrote and directed Dillinger (1973). "I deliberately chose Dillinger because he was a pure criminal", said Milius. "Robbing banks to right social wrongs did not come into it."

The movie was moderately successful and launched Milius's directing career. He worked on the script for a TV sequel, Melvin Purvis: G-Man (1974), a pilot for a proposed series about Melvin Purvis (there was a second TV movie, but no series), but did not like the director, Dan Curtis, or the experience of working for TV.

Contemporary film critics grouped Milius in with the emerging "movie brats" generation of filmmakers that also including Lucas, Coppola, Terrence Malick, and Scorsese.

In 1974, David Picker announced he would produce Ranch Life and the Hunting Trail directed by Milius and written by Winfred Blevins, about Theodore Roosevelt. The film was never made. Neither was The Life and Times of Joe McCarthy, a proposed biopic about the famous anti-Communist Senator, which Milius declared interest in making.

==== The Wind and the Lion ====
Milius next wrote and directed the popular adventure film The Wind and the Lion (1975), which starred Sean Connery and Candice Bergen. He later said he felt this was his first "real" movie.

He intended to follow this with Give Your Heart to the Hawks, a story about mountain man Jedediah Smith in the 1820s based on the novel by Winfred Blevins "It's my interpretation of Jedediah Smith, which might not be exactly historical", said Milius. "It'll be about exploration, about the need to see what's over the next ridge and what that does, what price you pay, to find out. Like Dirty Harry, Smith is a classic lone man, with a searing loneliness about him. A leader of men is always alone." It was never made; neither was Man-Eaters of Kumoan (1976) based on book by Jim Corbett about a tiger hunter in India which Milius worked on.

For several years, he developed with Stanley Kubrick an adaptation of Night Drop by S. L. A. Marshall. "We talked about it for years and years and worked on it for a long time, but we never did it."

Milius did come close to making Extreme Prejudice, based on his script, in 1976. However he decided to make Big Wednesday instead; Extreme Prejudice would be made a decade later, much rewritten, and directed by Walter Hill.

==== Big Wednesday and the A Team ====
In 1975, Milius formed his own production company, The A Team, with Buzz Feitshans, who had edited Dillinger. They had a five-year deal with Warner Bros.. Milius said, "Our motto is Civitas Sine Prudentia, which really translates to Social Irresponsibility; I believe in it. It's refreshing, it's liberating. Americans are basically socially irresponsible ... Who else would have invented the atomic bomb quite the same way? The Nazis would have invented it with the desire to conquer the world; we were the only people that could have invented it with the desire not to conquer the world"

Its first production was an autobiographical surfing picture, Big Wednesday (1978), which he called "a surfing How Green Was My Valley". This was a major commercial disappointment although it has gone on to be a cult film. Milius's friendship with George Lucas saw him given a percentage of the profits for Star Wars, which Mike Medavoy estimated earned Milius $1.5 million—in exchange Milius gave Lucas a percentage of the profits for Big Wednesday which amounted to virtually nothing.

In 1979, Milius said "the ultimate aim of the A Team is that it will become a company that makes lots of projects. I shall be the figurehead and the father figure and take a percentage and I won't have to do anything except go off and direct my movie once every three years."

The A Team made a number of movies not directed by Milius. Notably, they produced the first three films from Robert Zemeckis and Bob Gale: I Wanna Hold Your Hand, 1941 (directed by Steven Spielberg), and Used Cars. He also produced Hardcore, directed by friend Paul Schrader.

Schrader once described Milius's writing as containing too many good lines and scenes. He says Warren Beatty once "told John something I've been telling him too: 'You come too soon and you come too often.'... He's so full of juice he just can't stop coming, rather than holding back and tightening the situation and building characters. That releasing diffuses the energy, the characters are too broad because they never have time to build up the inner strength."

==== Apocalypse Now ====
Milius says he was offered $17,000 to rewrite Skin Game (1971) but then Francis Ford Coppola made a competing offer of $15,000 for Milius to write Apocalypse Now. Apocalypse Now was an adaptation of Heart of Darkness set in the Vietnam War which George Lucas intended to direct as a follow-up to his first feature THX 1138 (1971). Milius says Coppola:

Offered that wonderful fork in the road where I could go do my own thing rather than just rewrite some piece of crap that would probably be rewritten by somebody else. That was the most important decision I made in my life as a writer. That sort of steered me onto the path of doing my own work and being a little more like a novelist ... I tackled an unpopular subject that no one was going to make a movie about where the chances were really slim that I could pull it off. There was no book, nothing but me and the blank page. And that was wonderful because I had followed my heart. One of the nicest times in my life was writing Apocalypse Now.

The commercial failure of THX 1138 delayed production plans for Apocalypse Now. Milius later said of the Apocalypse Now script, "No one would touch it because of the Vietnam War. Everyone loved it, it did more for my career than any other script because it was always considered a work of genius; from the minute it came out, it really stirred people up. It's a good script, it's certainly no work of genius. It churns people up, and that's what they think works of genius are supposed to do."

However, the following year saw the release of Apocalypse Now, directed by Francis Ford Coppola. Coppola rewrote the script, which Milius disliked. "He wanted to ruin it, liberalize it, and turn it into Hair", said Milius in 1976. "He sees himself as a great humanitarian, an enlightened soul who will tell you such wonderful things as he does at the end of Godfather 2 -- that crime doesn't pay ... Talent-wise, he's no John Ford; character-wise, he's no Steve Spielberg. Francis can't stand to have any other creative influence around ... Francis Coppola has this compelling desire to save humanity when the man is a raving fascist, the Bay Area Mussolini."

The film was released in 1979 to great acclaim.

Milius's old agent, Mike Medavoy, helped establish Orion Pictures in 1978 and one of their first movies was going to be East of Suez, written and directed by Milius. It was not made.

Spielberg said in 1978 that Milius was key to the group of young filmmakers known as the New Hollywood, which included himself, Lucas, and Coppola:

John is our Scoutmaster. He's the one who will tell you to go on a trip and only take enough food, enough water for one day, and make you stay out longer than that. He's the one who says, "Be a man. I don't want to see any tears." He's a terrific raconteur, a wonderful story teller. John has more life than all the rest of us put together.

(Quentin Tarantino said he could imagine the film Deliverance being about "Hollywood filmmakers: you can imagine Spielberg, Lucas, and Scorsese as the husbands. And you can really imagine John Milius as Lewis.")

==== 1980s ====
In 1982, Milius directorial effort Conan the Barbarian was released, based on the character created by Robert E. Howard. The film is credited for turning its lead, Arnold Schwarzenegger, into a star. Milius was interested in the project since the late 1970s. While he was about to get hired for scripting duties, he had to pass due to his commitment to Big Wednesday. Instead, Oliver Stone was hired to write the project. Eventually, producer Dino De Laurentiis with whom Milius had contractual obligations joined the project. Milius returned to the project as its director re-working Stone's script. Upon its release the film was popular. The film was the 15th highest-grossing film in the USA that year, making $39,565,475 domestically.

In 1983, he was among the producers of Ted Kotcheff's Uncommon Valor, and credited as a "spiritual adviser" in the action film Lone Wolf McQuade.

In 1984, he directed the popular action film, Red Dawn. The film is about a Russian invasion in the United States, and a rogue commando group of teenagers standing up to the invaders. Some critics perceived it to be "warmongering propaganda" while Milius said it was "anti-war". The film was the 19th highest-grossing film in the USA that year, making $38,376,497 domestically.

He wrote and directed an episode for The New Twilight Zone (1985) and a story of his, "Viking Bikers from Hell", was used in an episode of Miami Vice (season 3, episode 22).

In 1986, it was reported that he was writing the script for Fatal Beauty which he hoped to direct with Cher; the film was made by Tom Holland and starred Whoopi Goldberg.

There was some talk that he would direct a movie for HBO, Capone, but it was not made.

In the late 1980s Milius wrote and directed a Pacific War adventure film Farewell to the King (1989). This flopped at the box office. In 1989, he tried to get funding for adaptations of Allan W. Eckert's "The Frontiersmen: A Narrative", about settling the Ohio River Valley, and "Half of the Sky", about a Rocky Mountains explorer.

Sean Connery was hired to star in the film The Hunt for Red October for producer Mace Neufeld, based on Tom Clancy's novel of the same name. Connery thought the script was "too American" and insisted Neufeld hire John Milius to rewrite the Russian sequences. Connery thought with Milius, he could "get a different sort of image, different speech patterns."

Neufeld then hired Milius to write and direct Flight of the Intruder, based on the book by Stephen Coonts. It too was not a financial success.

"I think the culture had changed and that is why my films were less accepted", he reflected later. "I still think those are also great films, Farewell to the King especially."

=== Later ===
==== 1990s: screenwriting, cable TV ====
In 1992, Milius claimed that he was blacklisted for his conservative beliefs in liberal Hollywood, saying that his flops were not as forgiven as those from more leftist directors. "It weighs ten times heavier against me", he said. "If you don't share the politically correct vision, then you are an outlaw, you are hunted and there is a price on your head, and if they catch you they will hang you."

The film of Hunt for the Red October had been a big success, however, and Milius remained in high demand as a screenwriter: he did several drafts of another Clancy adaptation, Clear and Present Danger (1994), which was another hit.

Milius worked on a number on unfilmed scripts, including Bad Iron, a biker movie written by Kent Anderson, which he intended to produce. He was going to direct a film about Alexander the Great starring Jean-Claude Van Damme but that was put on hold when a miniseries on the same topic was made by Italian TV. He wrote Harlot's Ghost, for Francis Ford Coppola, based on a novel by Norman Mailer; Milius described it as "a cross between The Godfather and Apocalypse Now. It's about families and duplicity and danger, but this time provoked by the government."

He adapted the Sgt. Rock comics for producer Joel Silver, with either Renny Harlin and Paul Verhoeven attached at certain points respectively. And also wrote a version of Die Hard 3, co-written with Barry Beckerman. In the early 1990s he wrote Texas Rangers, about the establishment of that organization, for Frank Price at Columbia. He hoped to direct the film, but could not raise the funding.

In 1993, he replaced Andrei Konchalovsky as director on The Northmen for Morgan Creek Productions, about an English monk who gets captured by a band of Vikings. "This was inevitable", Milius said of his directing a Viking film. "I've been a practicing pagan for a long time. Conan the Barbarian was really a Viking movie but it was disguised." However, financing fell through. He was going to direct an adaptation of Tom Clancy's novel Without Remorse with Gary Sinise and Laurence Fishburne, but the project folded in 1995, two weeks before shooting was to commence due to the financial collapse of Savoy Pictures.

A Milius script that was filmed was his biopic of Geronimo, Geronimo: An American Legend, for Walter Hill.

He also directed two films for cable: Motorcycle Gang (1994) and Rough Riders (1997).

==== 2000s ====
In 2000, Milius was hired to work as a creative consultant with the Institute for Creative Technologies to pre-visualize the challenges to peace that America will face and the advanced virtual reality technologies necessary to train U.S. troops for the future. "Through his enormous body of work, John has shown a deep understanding of the human condition and the ways that conflict can be resolved", said ICT executive director Richard Lindheim. "Furthermore our efforts will benefit greatly from his vision of the world in the near future, and the techniques and procedures that will be needed to maintain security."

That year he also wrote two biopics: Le May for Robert Zemeckis, about Curtis LeMay; and Manila John, about John Basilone, which he was going to make for HBO. Warner Bros. wanted him to update Dirty Harry and he wanted them to fund a version of The Iliad; there was also talk he would make The Alamo for HBO.

In the early 2000s he worked on King Conan: Crown of Iron (2001−02), a sequel to Conan the Barbarian. Later, in 2019 Arnold Schwarzenegger met with Milius to discuss the status of the project. "We're on the same page," he said. "We both want to get it done."

He also developed Jornada del Muerto (Journey of Death) (2003), a biker film starring Triple H and wrote a pilot for a TV show for UPN, Delta, about a military special ops team that takes on terrorists. None of these movies were made.

Texas Rangers (2001) was eventually made, though Milius stated that his script was substantially rewritten.

==== Financial difficulties ====
Milius suffered a major financial reversal in the late 1990s and early 2000s when his accountant embezzled from him an estimated $3 million.

He tried to get a job as a staff writer on the TV show Deadwood; showrunner David Milch was reluctant as he did not consider Milius a staff writer. Milius pleaded that he needed the money in order to pay for his son's tuition at law school, so Milch simply paid the fees. Milius's career recovered when he helped create the BBC/HBO television series Rome, which allowed him to repay Milch.

He wrote some pilots which did not go to series—Dodge City (circa 2005)—a Western series for CBS, and Saigon Bureau (2008)—about the AIP Bureau of photojournalists in the Vietnam War, a collaboration with Chris Noth based on the book Requiem. He also wrote a script about the Battle of Chosin Reservoir in the Korean War, The Chosin Few for Mark Cuban's 2929 Entertainment, and The Iron Horsemen, a motorcycle feature.

==== Health problems ====
In 2010 Milius was working on a new project, a film biography of Genghis Khan, and a proposed TV series called Pharaoh, set during the reign of Queen Hatshepsut, when he had a stroke. For a while he was unable to speak or move, but ultimately he recovered.

As of 2025, he was battling terminal cancer.

==== Video games ====
In March 2011, Milius was a story consultant for the video game Homefront about a North Korean conquest of America.

== Influence ==
Milius has long claimed to be an outsider in Hollywood. In 2001 he stated:

I've always been considered a nut. They kind of tolerate me. It's certainly affected me. I've been blacklisted for a large part of my career because of my politics—as surely as any writer was blacklisted back in the 1950s. It's just that my politics are from the other side, and Hollywood always veers left.

He wrote a number of iconic film lines such as "Charlie don't surf" and "I love the smell of napalm in the morning", from Apocalypse Now, and the famous Harry Callahan one-liners delivered by Clint Eastwood, including "Go ahead, make my day" and "Ask yourself one question, 'Do I feel lucky?' Well, do you, punk?" Milius also had a hand in the USS Indianapolis monologue in the film Jaws; the sequence was performed by Robert Shaw. When Spielberg asked him to contribute to the screenplay for Saving Private Ryan, Milius suggested the opening and closing scenes at Normandy cemetery where Ryan, now an elderly hero of World War II, in a moment of survivor guilt, asks his wife "Did I live a good life?"

After his work on Rough Riders (1997), Milius became an instrumental force in lobbying Congress to award President Theodore Roosevelt the Medal of Honor (posthumously), for acts of conspicuous gallantry while in the Battle of San Juan Hill. Milius made two films featuring Roosevelt: The Wind and the Lion (where he was played by Brian Keith) and the made-for-TV film Rough Riders (where Tom Berenger took the role).

The character of John Milner from the 1973 George Lucas film American Graffiti was inspired in part by Milius, who was a good friend of Lucas while they were at USC film school. Likewise, the character Walter Sobchak in the 1998 film The Big Lebowski (portrayed by John Goodman) was partly inspired by Milius, a friend of The Coen Brothers. The novella Blind Jozef Pronek and Dead Souls by Aleksandar Hemon features an episode with Milius, who is described as "sitting at a desk sucking on a cigar as long as a walking stick".

Milius was also instrumental during the startup of the Ultimate Fighting Championship (UFC): he helped to create the octagon-shaped cage, and his association with UFC helped provide interest and investors to the startup UFC. Milus was a student of Rorion Gracie, and was recruited by Gracie and businessman Art Davie, agreeing to be the first event's creative director, although he left organization of the event early on.

In 2013, a documentary about his life and career, titled Milius, was released.

Writer Nat Segaloff called Milius:

The best writer of the so-called USC Mafia, a tight-knit group that resuscitated—some say homogenised American cinema in the 1970s ... Raised on Ford, Hawks, Lean and Kurosawa, shaped by filmmakers as disparate as Fellini and Delmer Daves, Milius favours history books over comic books, character over special effects, and heroes with roots in reality, time, place and customs. Milius' stories reflect his own deeply held ethic, which embraces the values of tradition, adventure, spiritualism, honour and an intense loyalty to friends ... Although he privately chafes at his public image as a gun-toting, liberal baiting provocateur, he allows himself to be painted as such, at times even holding the brush. He plays the Hollywood game like a pro, yet sticks to his own rules; he is a romantic filmmaker who avoids love scenes; his movies contain violence, yet no death in them is without meaning.

Milius himself once said:

Never compromise excellence. To write for someone else is the biggest mistake that any writer makes. You should be your biggest competitor, your biggest critic, your biggest fan, because you don't know what anybody else thinks. How arrogant it is to assume that you know the market, that you know what's popular today—only Steven Spielberg knows what's popular today. Only Steven Spielberg will ever know what's popular. So leave it to him. He's the only one in the history of man who has ever figured that out. Write what you want to see. Because if you don't, you're not going to have any true passion in it, and it's not going to be done with any true artistry.

Triple H, retired WWE wrestler and current Head of Creative for WWE, cites Milius as an inspiration in how to tell a compelling story within a wrestling match without having to rely on over-the-top action, as he stated that Milius did not rely on action in his work to tell a compelling story to the audience.

A character in the 2023 film Rebel Moon is named after Milius as an homage from the film's co-writers Kurt Johnstad and Zack Snyder.

== Awards and honors ==
For writing the Apocalypse Now screenplay, Milius and Francis Ford Coppola were nominated for the Academy Award for Best Adapted Screenplay, and the Writers Guild of America Award for Best Drama Written Directly for the Screen (Though the film was an adaptation of Heart of Darkness, the Writers Guild considered it an original screenplay.).

In 2007, Milius was the recipient of the Austin Film Festival's Distinguished Screenwriter Award. In his acceptance speech, he said that his favorites of his films were The Wind and the Lion, Big Wednesday, and Conan.

== Personal life ==
Milius has been married three times. He has two children with his first wife, and one child with his second wife, Celia Kaye. His current marriage (since 1992) is to Elan Oberon.

Milius was a passionate surfer for much of his life but gave it up when he turned fifty.

=== Views ===
Milius is a self-proclaimed "Zen anarchist", but he also publicly aligns himself with conservative factions in Hollywood and he was interviewed in the documentary Rated R: Republicans in Hollywood. He has also been consultant to a military think tank, the Institute for Creative Technologies. Milius said:

I'm not a reactionary—I'm just a right-wing extremist so far beyond the Christian Identity people like that and stuff, that they can't even imagine. I'm so far beyond that I'm a Maoist. I'm an anarchist. I've always been an anarchist. Any true, real right-winger if he goes far enough hates all form of government, because government should be done to cattle and not human beings.

Milius has endorsed minimum wage laws and conscription. Milius was also quoted as saying that "it might not have been bad for this country" if Douglas MacArthur had "crossed the Mississippi like Caesar crossed the Rubicon and proclaimed himself Emperor Douglas the First." For years, Milius was a member of the board of directors of the National Rifle Association of America (NRA), where he was a leader (with Charlton Heston) in resisting a takeover attempt by advocates of the so-called Militia Movement.

"I'd like to be Jack Hawkins in Bridge on the River Kwai", said Milius. "I call myself romantic. I believe in a lot of 19th-century ideals: chivalry, honor, loyalty, romantic love."

In 2009, Milius signed a petition in support of Roman Polanski, who had been detained while traveling to a film festival in relation to his 1977 sexual abuse charges, which the petition argued would undermine the tradition of film festivals as a place for works to be shown "freely and safely", and that arresting filmmakers traveling to neutral countries could open the door "for actions of which no-one can know the effects."

== Filmography ==
=== Feature films ===
Year	Title	Director	Writer
1969	The Devil's 8	No	Yes
1971	Evel Knievel	No	Yes
1972	The Life and Times of Judge Roy Bean	No	Yes
1972	Jeremiah Johnson	No	Yes
1973	Magnum Force	No	Yes
1973	Dillinger	Yes	Yes
1975	The Wind and the Lion	Yes	Yes
1978	Big Wednesday	Yes	Yes
1979	Apocalypse Now	No	Yes
1982	Conan the Barbarian	Yes	Yes
1984	Red Dawn	Yes	Yes
1987	Extreme Prejudice	No	Story
1989	Farewell to the King	Yes	Yes
1991	Flight of the Intruder	Yes	No
1993	Geronimo: An American Legend	No	Yes
1994	Clear and Present Danger	No	Yes
2001	Texas Rangers	No	Yes

Uncredited script revisions

- Dirty Harry (1971)
- Jaws (1975)
- The Black Bird (1975)
- Uncommon Valor (1983) (Also producer)
- Indiana Jones and the Temple of Doom (1984)
- The Hunt for Red October (1990)
- Eraser (1996)
- Saving Private Ryan (1998)
- Behind Enemy Lines (2001)

Executive producer

- I Wanna Hold Your Hand (1978)
- Hardcore (1979)
- 1941 (1979) (Also story writer)
- Used Cars (1980)

=== Short films ===
Year	Title	Director	Writer	Notes
1966	The Reversal of Richard Sun	Yes	No	
1966	Marcello, I'm So Bored	Yes	No	Co-directed with John Strawbridge
1967	Glut	No	Yes	
1967	The Emperor	No	Yes	

Acting credits

Year	Title	Role	Notes
1966	The Reversal of Richard Sun	The Chauffeur	Short film
1973	Deadhead Miles	State Trooper	
1975	The Wind and the Lion	The One-Armed Military Advisor	
1975	Crazy Mama	Cop	
1978	Big Wednesday	Marijuana Dealer in Tijuana	
1982	Conan the Barbarian	Foodseller in the Old City	Deleted scene

=== Television ===
Year	Title	Director	Writer	Producer	Creator	Notes
1985	The Twilight Zone	Yes	No	No	No	Episode: "Opening Day" (S1 E10c)
1987	Miami Vice	No	Story	No	No	Episode: "Viking Bikers from Hell" (S3 E22)
2005	Rome	No	Yes	Yes	Yes	Episode: "Egeria" (S1 E6)

TV movies

Year	Title	Director	Writer
1974	Melvin Purvis: G-Man	No	Yes
1994	Motorcycle Gang	Yes	No
1997	Rough Riders	Yes	Yes

=== Unrealized projects ===
Year	Title and description	Ref(s)
1960s	An untitled romantic war film set during the battle of Dien Bien Phu	
1960s	Los Gringos, a Western described as being similar to The Wild Bunch	
1960s	The Last Resort	
1970s	The Texans, a "contemporary version of Red River"	
1970s	The Haul, a film about a truck driver	
1970s	Ranch Life and the Hunting Trail, a biopic written by Winfred Blevins about Theodore Roosevelt	
1970s	The Life and Times of Joe McCarthy, a biopic about anti-Communist Senator Joseph McCarthy	
1970s	Taxi Driver	
1970s	A film adaptation of Winfred Blevins' novel Give Your Heart to the Hawks	
1970s	A film adaptation of Jim Corbett's novel Man-Eaters of Kumoan	
1970s	A film adaptation of S. L. A. Marshall's novel Night Drop for Stanley Kubrick	
1970s	Extreme Prejudice	
1970s	An unused version of Firepower, initially conceived as a Dirty Harry film	
1970s	East of Suez	
1980s	An unused draft of The Texas Chainsaw Massacre 2 for Tobe Hooper	
1980s	An untitled "semi-political fantasy thriller" script for Jonathan Demme	
1980s	Fatal Beauty starring Cher	
1980s	Capone, a biopic of mobster Al Capone	
1980s	A film adaptation of Allan W. Eckert's novel The Frontiersmen	
1980s	Half of the Sky, a film about a Rocky Mountains explorer	
1980s	Leningrad: The 900 Days, a script for Sergio Leone	
1990s	Alexander the Great, a biopic about Alexander III of Macedon starring Jean-Claude Van Damme	
1990s	Bad Iron, a biker film written by Kent Anderson	
1990s	A film adaptation of Norman Mailer's novel Harlot's Ghost for Francis Ford Coppola	
1990s	An unused draft of Die Hard 3, co-written with Barry Beckerman	
1990s	The Texas Rangers starring Tommy Lee Jones	
1990s	A film adaptation of the Sgt. Rock comics for Renny Harlin	
1990s	The Northmen, a film about an English monk who gets captured by a band of Vikings	
1990s	A film adaptation of John Carlova's novel Mistress of the Seas for Jean-Jacques Annaud	
1990s	Daniel Boone, a biopic of Daniel Boone	
1990s	The Vikings	
1990s	A film adaptation of Michael Blake's novel Marching to Valhalla: A Novel of Custer's Last Days starring Brad Pitt	
1990s	A film adaptation of Tom Clancy's novel The Cardinal of the Kremlin	
1990s	A film adaptation of Tom Clancy's novel Without Remorse starring Gary Sinise and Laurence Fishburne	
1990s	An unused draft of Mexico: The Aztec Account of the Conquest for Werner Herzog	
1990s	An untitled script about the Battle of Camarón	
1990s	A film adaptation of Gabriel García Márquez's novel The General in His Labyrinth for Francis Ford Coppola	
1990s	A biopic of Napoleon Bonaparte for Francis Ford Coppola	
1990s	M.A.D.: The Life and Times of Curtis LeMay, a biopic of U.S. Air Force general Curtis LeMay for Robert Zemeckis	
2000s	Manila John, a biopic of war hero John Basilone	
2000s	A reboot of the Dirty Harry film series	
2000s	A film adaptation of Homer's the Iliad	
2000s	The Alamo	
2000s	The Son Tay Raid, retitled from The Greatest Raid of All, a film co-written with John Plaster about the Vietnam War raid to rescue POWs	
2000s	King Conan: Crown of Iron, a sequel to his film Conan the Barbarian	
2000s	An untitled Western script set in post-revolution Mexico for Mike Newell	
2000s	Delta, a TV pilot about the special ops team Delta Force that joins forces with the CIA to take on terrorists	
2000s	A biopic about the young life of Theodore Roosevelt	
2000s	Jornada del Muerte, modern-day "motor cycle Western" set in the Southwest starring Triple H	
2000s	Dodge City, a Western series	
2000s	The Chosin Few, a film about the Battle of Chosin Reservoir	
2000s	The Iron Horsemen, a biker film	
2000s	Saigon Bureau, a TV pilot adaptation of Requiem starring Chris Noth	
2000s	Genghis Khan, a biopic of Genghis Khan starring Mickey Rourke	
2010s	Pharaoh, a TV pilot set in ancient Egypt	

== Bibliography ==
- The Life and Times of Judge Roy Bean (1972) – based on his script
- The Wind and the Lion (1975) – based on his script
- Homefront: The Voice of Freedom (2011) – based on the video game
