= Marcello, I'm So Bored =

- Directed by: John Milius; John Strawbridge
- Edited by: George Lucas
- Release date: 1966
- Country: United States

Marcello, I'm So Bored is a 1966 short animated film co-directed by John Milius and John Strawbridge. The film was made when Milius was a student at the University of Southern California and was a parody of Italian cinema.

The film was edited by George Lucas.
