= Jeremiah Johnson (film) =

1972 American Western film by Sydney Pollack

- Theatrical release poster
- Directed by: Sydney Pollack
- Screenplay by: Edward Anhalt; John Milius
- Story by: Raymond W. Thorp; Robert Bunker
- Based on: Mountain Man by Vardis Fisher; Crow Killer by Raymond W. Thorp and Robert Bunker
- Produced by: Joe Wizan
- Starring: Robert Redford; Will Geer; Allyn Ann McLerie; Stefan Gierasch; Charles Tyner; Delle Bolton
- Cinematography: Duke Callaghan
- Edited by: Thomas Stanford
- Music by: Tim McIntire; John Rubinstein
- Production company: Sanford Productions (III)
- Distributed by: Warner Bros.
- Release dates: May 7, 1972 (Cannes); December 21, 1972 (New York City)
- Running time: 108 minutes 116 minutes (w/ Overture and Intermission)
- Country: United States
- Languages: English; Crow; Salish
- Budget: $3.1 million
- Box office: $44.7 million

Jeremiah Johnson is a 1972 American Western film directed by Sydney Pollack and starring Robert Redford as the title character and Will Geer as "Bear Claw" Chris Lapp. It is based partly on the life of the legendary mountain man John Jeremiah Johnson, recounted in Raymond Thorp and Robert Bunker's book Crow Killer: The Saga of Liver-Eating Johnson and Vardis Fisher's 1965 novel Mountain Man.

The script was written by John Milius and Edward Anhalt; the film was shot at various locations in Redford's adopted home state of Utah. It was entered into the 1972 Cannes Film Festival on May 7, 1972 and was later released on December 21, 1972, by Warner Bros. Pictures.

The film received positive reviews from critics and was a box-office success, earning $44.7 million against a budget of $3.1 million, making it the 5th highest-grossing film of 1972.

== Plot ==
Around 1848, Mexican War veteran Jeremiah Johnson takes up the life of a mountain man, supporting himself in the Rocky Mountains as a trapper. His first winter in mountain country is difficult, and he has a run-in with Paints-His-Shirt-Red, a chief of the Crow tribe. Johnson inadvertently disrupts the grizzly bear hunt of the elderly and eccentric Chris Lapp, nicknamed "Bear Claw", who mentors him on living in the high country. After a brush with Crows, including Lapp's acquaintance Paints-His-Shirt-Red and learning the skills required to survive, Johnson sets off on his own.

He comes across a cabin whose inhabitants were apparently attacked by Blackfoot warriors, leaving alive only a woman and her uncommunicative son. The woman, maddened by grief, forces Johnson to adopt her son. He and the boy, whom Johnson dubs "Caleb", come across Del Gue, a mountain man who has been robbed by the Blackfeet. Gue persuades Johnson to help recover his stolen goods, but Johnson counsels against violence when they find the Blackfoot camp.

The men sneak into the camp at night to retrieve Gue's possessions, but Gue opens fire and the mountain men then kill the Blackfeet. Gue takes several Blackfoot horses and scalps. Johnson, disgusted with the needless killing, returns to Caleb. Soon afterward, they are surprised by Christianized Flatheads, who take them in as guests of honor. Johnson unknowingly places the chief in his debt by giving him the Blackfeet horses and scalps. According to Flathead custom, to maintain his honor the chief must either give his guest a greater gift or kill him. The chief gives his daughter Swan to be Johnson's bride. After the wedding, Gue goes off on his own, and Johnson, Caleb and Swan journey into the wilderness. Johnson finds a suitable location to build a cabin. They settle into this new home and slowly become a family.

This life is interrupted by the arrival of a U.S. Army cavalry rescue party tasked with saving a stranded wagon train of settlers. Although Johnson is reluctant, he is pressed into guiding the rescue party through the mountains, leaving his family alone at their cabin. During the journey, cavalry commander Lieutenant Mulvey orders the party to proceed through a sacred Crow burial ground against Johnson's advice. Afterward, Johnson returns home by the same route and notices that the graves are now adorned with Swan's blue trinkets; he rushes back to the cabin, where he finds that Swan and Caleb have been killed.

Johnson sets off after the warriors who killed his family and attacks them, killing all but one, a heavy-set man who sings his death song when he realizes he cannot escape. Johnson leaves him alive, and the survivor spreads the tale of the mountain man's quest for revenge throughout the region, trapping Johnson in a feud with the Crow. The tribe sends its best warriors one at a time to kill Johnson, but he defeats each one. His legend grows, and the Crow come to respect him. He meets Gue again and returns to the cabin of Caleb's mother, only to find that she has died and a new settler named Qualen and his family are living there. Nearby the Crow have built a monument to Johnson's bravery, leaving trinkets and talismans as tribute.

Johnson and Lapp meet for a final time. It is at this meeting that Lapp realizes the heavy toll that fighting an entire nation alone in a vast and lonesome frontier has taken on Johnson. Lapp indicates as much when he remarks that Johnson has "come far", to which Johnson replies "Feels like far." Lapp then queries "Were it worth the trouble?" "What trouble?" Johnson replies. Later, Johnson has a wordless encounter with Paints-His-Shirt-Red, presumed to be behind the attacks. While sitting astride their horses far apart, Johnson reaches for his rifle, but Paints-His-Shirt-Red raises his hand, open-palmed, in a gesture of peace that Johnson returns, signaling an end to their conflict. The film ends with the song lyrics, "And some folks say he's up there still."

== Cast ==
- Robert Redford as Jeremiah Johnson
- Will Geer as Bear Claw
- Delle Bolton as Swan
- Josh Albee as Caleb
- Joaquín Martínez as Paints His Shirt Red
- Allyn Ann McLerie as the crazy woman
- Stefan Gierasch as Del Gue
- Richard Angarola as Chief Two-Tongues Lebeaux
- Paul Benedict as the Reverend
- Charles Tyner as Robidoux
- Jack Colvin as Lieutenant Mulvey
- Matt Clark as Qualen

In addition, Tanya Tucker, in a brief uncredited appearance filmed a year before the release of her hit song "Delta Dawn", appears as Qualen's child.

== Production ==
=== Development ===
In April 1968, producer Sidney Beckerman acquired the film rights to the biographical book Crow Killer: The Saga of Liver-Eating Johnson by Raymond W. Thorp Jr. and Robert Bunker. By May 1970, the rights were acquired by Warner Bros., who assigned John Milius to write a screen adaptation. Based roughly on Crow Killer as well as Mountain Man: A Novel of Male and Female in the Early American West by Vardis Fisher, Milius first scripted what would become known as Jeremiah Johnson for $5,000 (equivalent to $41,000 in 2025); however, he was then hired to rewrite it several times and eventually earned $80,000 (equivalent to $660,000 in 2025). According to Milius, Edward Anhalt and David Rayfiel were brought in to work on the screenplay only for Milius to be continually rehired because no one else could write the dialogue. Milius says he got the idiom and American spirit from Carl Sandburg and was also influenced by Charles Portis's novel True Grit.

The role of Jeremiah Johnson was originally intended for Lee Marvin and then Clint Eastwood, with Sam Peckinpah to direct. However, Peckinpah and Eastwood did not get along, so Peckinpah left and Eastwood decided to make Dirty Harry instead. Warner Bros. then stepped in and set up Milius's screenplay for Robert Redford. Without a director, Redford talked Sydney Pollack into it; the two were looking for another film to collaborate on after This Property Is Condemned (1966).

Casting for the role of Swan, Johnson's wife, took three months. After auditioning for another role, actress Delle Bolton was spotted by the casting director, followed up by her participation in the UCLA School of Theatre Arts Hugh O'Brian Awards competition. Bolton then interviewed with 200 Native American women and eventually won the role, even though she herself was not Native American.

=== Filming ===
After Warner Bros. advanced Redford $200,000 to secure the film's rights for him, Warner decided that the film had to be shot on the studio's backlot due to cost constraints. Insisting that it must be shot on location in Utah, Redford and Pollack convinced the studio that this could be done at the same cost. To prepare for production, art director Ted Haworth drove over 26,000 miles to find locations. Ultimately, it was shot in nearly one hundred locations across Utah, including Mount Timpanogos, Ashley National Forest, Leeds, Snow Canyon State Park, St. George, Sundance Resort, Uinta National Forest, Wasatch-Cache National Forest, and Zion National Park.

Principal photography began in January 1971, but unexpected weather threatened production. Even after Pollack mortgaged his home to supplement the limited budget, production remained constrained. "The snows of St. George in southern Utah were terrible," said Pollack, "and we were using Cinemobiles as the lifelines. There was no way I was going to let it overrun, and Bob was a superb partner in keeping us tight. In the end, it was the greatest way to learn production, because I was playing with my own money." Struggling with weather and the budget, rarely was the crew able to shoot any second takes.

The film took seven and a half months to edit. "It's a picture that was made as much in the editing room as it was in the shooting," said Pollack. "It was a film where you used to watch dailies and everybody would fall asleep, except Bob and I, because all you had were these big shots of a guy walking his horse through the snow. You didn't see strong narrative line. It's a picture made out of rhythms and moods and wonderful performances."

=== Music ===
The score was composed by Tim McIntire and John Rubinstein (sung by Tim McIntire); known primarily as actors, they were also musicians. This was their film composing debut, arising after Rubinstein met Sydney Pollack through his agent. As Pollack recalls in the DVD commentary, McIntire and Rubinstein were "kids that just auditioned with a tape."

The soundtrack L.P. was not released until April 2, 1976, by Warner Bros. Records. On October 5, 2009, a restored and extended version of the L.P. was released by Film Score Monthly.

== Release ==
Jeremiah Johnson had its world-wide premiere on May 7 at the 1972 Cannes Film Festival, where it was screened in competition. It was the first Western film ever to be accepted in the festival. The film's U.S. preview was at the Chief Theater in Pocatello, ID, followed by its American premiere on December 2 in Boise, Idaho, with its theatrical release in the United States beginning on December 21, 1972, in New York City.

The film earned $8,350,000 in U.S. & Canadian rentals by the end of 1973. Reissues in 1974 and 1975 saw it earn additional rentals of $10,000,000 and $4 million respectively. In the U.S. and Canada it has grossed $44,693,786 with a reported reissue gross of $25,000,000.

=== Home media ===
The film was first released onto DVD by Warner Home Video on October 28, 1997. It was later released onto Blu-ray on May 1, 2012.

=== Critical reception ===
The film received positive reviews. Review aggregator Rotten Tomatoes gave it a "Fresh" rating of 92% based on reviews from 24 critics, with an average score of 7.1/10 and the site's consensus stating: "Jeremiah Johnson's deliberate pace demands an investment from the viewer, but it's rewarded with a thoughtful drama anchored by a starring performance from Robert Redford." On Metacritic it has a score of 75% based on reviews from 7 critics.

The New York Times film critic Roger Greenspun noted in his 1972 review, "That it does not succeed entirely is perhaps less the fault of the actor or of the conception than of a screenplay that tends to be ponderous about its imponderables and that every so often sounds as if it might have been written by the authors of the Bible ... But for all its involvement with academic cinema art, Jeremiah Johnson is full of compensations. There are [moments] of great beauty and terror and deeply earned pathos." A report in Variety from Cannes stated: "The film has its own force and beauty and the only carp might lie in its not always clear exegesis of the humanistic spirit and freedom most of its characters are striving for. It is not a new-type Western, with its demystifications, dirt and underlining of the brutishness of the times, as well as its heroic aspects, but it does show a deeper insight into the Indian–white relations and benefits from superb direction, excellent lensing and sharp editing." Gene Siskel of the Chicago Tribune gave the film 3 stars out of 4 and wrote, "Oddly enough, it is the violent scenes, the ones that don't work within the story, in which Pollack excels. Jeremiah's battle with a pack of wolves, and, later, a pack of Crow Indians, are stunning examples of direction and editing." Charles Champlin of the Los Angeles Times praised the film for "a rare and tonic authenticity," elaborating that "the film does not so much reveal a way of life as thrust us inside it. Making fire with flint and steel looks the miserably frustrating job it is; hunting and fishing look as exasperating as they are; snow looks as cold as it is and hands have the numbed and purpled look it gives them." Gary Arnold of The Washington Post dismissed the film as "rather ponderous" as it "just sort of moseys along, in an academically efficient way, without ever generating enough emotion or accumulating enough personal history. It's remarkably even and remarkably uncompelling." Tom Milne of The Monthly Film Bulletin wrote, "Good as it is, with fine performances and superb camerawork by Andrew Callaghan, Jeremiah Johnson still disappoints because it aims lower than it might have and does some sleight-of-hand to conceal the fact."

== Legacy ==
The film inspired the creation of the classic Italian comics character (and his eponymous publication) Ken Parker. Ken Parker is a Western anti-hero, based on Redford's portrayal of Jeremiah Johnson. Like Johnson, Parker is a trapper who had decided to escape from the first city to have appeared in the United States.

An animated GIF from the film of Redford nodding in approval has subsequently become a widely used Internet reaction meme/image macro.

== See also ==
- List of American films of 1972
- Survival film, about the film genre, with a list of related films
