= Testament of Man =

The Testament of Man (1943–1960), a twelve-volume series of novels by the American author Vardis Fisher, traces the physical, psychological and spiritual evolution of Western civilization from Australopithecus to the present. The series explores a pantheon of subjects: myth, ritual, language, family, sex and especially sin, guilt and religion. Each work emphasizes a particular pathway that Fisher considered of paramount importance in the development of the modern world and our current views.

Enlightened minds must wonder what the world would be like today if the torrent [that carries us along] had taken another channel at any one of a dozen moments in history. What if Greek values had triumphed in that war more than twenty−one centuries ago?

Fisher traced a specific pathway in which ape-like creatures segued to Middle Eastern tribes, followed by the development of Judaism and Christianity.

The task consumed two decades after prodigious preparation. By his own account, Fisher read more than 2,000 books and essays on a wide range of subjects - religion, anthropology, archaeology, music, food, psychology, evolution and climate. In The Great Confession, "Part III: The Orphans" Fisher describes his research in detail. In order to get into the mind of the ape-man, he lived like one, dwelling in caves, walking, eating, hunting and sleeping as he imagined they had. He observed apes in zoos and conducted behavioral experiments with animals. For example, he concluded that contrary to popular belief, animals did not generally recognize people by scent. He was convinced that Western religion developed out of fear, particularly that of the father. Judaism was the only ancient religion without a mother figure.

All volumes in the series are based on similar themes and characters, or personas. One theme is the role of gender in the rise of human civilization. He holds that female's feelings run deeper; she was more practical since her first duties were to home, food and children. The man, uninvolved with family, is egotistical, shallow and alone, yet this solitude gives rise to intellectual breakthroughs that radically changed ancient beliefs. One recurrent character is the misunderstood male genius, the neurotic thinker who suddenly grasps a unique thought that becomes increasingly influential to future generations. An intellectually strong woman often appears. She understands better than the male and assists in his quest into the unknown. Fisher's interest in men's long subjugation of women is a dominant theme throughout.

The controversial subject matter met with frequent, scathing denunciation that centered on three elements - his treatment of religion, sexual content and anthropological conclusions. Many reviewers objected to Fisher's penchant for interrupting the story with explanatory comments for the reader. Particularly reviled was his treatment of historical and biblical characters, religion in general, and Christianity and Judaism specifically. The Valley of Vision (1951), a novel of Solomon and his court, evoked a fierce review in Time:

Vardis Fisher's latest volume, the sixth in his ficto-stenographic history of civilization, is less a novel than a pedantic, prurient diatribe against one of the best-publicized kings Israel ever had. Solomon (10th Century B.C.) is presented as a sort of Old Testament Sammy Glick with chin whiskers, a tough opportunist who elbows his way into the big money, marries a glamor girl (Khate, an Egyptian princess), and hires a frustrated poet to ghost his copy—even, it would seem, such copy as the Book of Proverbs. Furthermore, says Fisher in effect, Solomon's wisdom was not even his own; it was just a lot of words put in his mouth by his ghostwriter and his Egyptian wife. The real Solomon, according to Fisher, was a phony liberal with a father complex and a massive sexual overcompensation; his quarrel with the prophet Ahijah was an exchange of irrelevancies between a dilettante and a fanatic.

The project was viewed as a financial risk and had trouble finding a publisher despite Fisher's fame as a popular Western novelist. When he presented Jesus Came Again: A Parable (1956), Caxton Press refused to publish it due to the heretical nature of the story. They thought the tale of a misunderstood, neurotic Jesus ("Joshua") who was all too human, and not the man who satisfied the universal yearnings of the times for a messiah, was too controversial. The project was picked up by Swallow Publishing, which printed the rest of the series. Fisher considered religion not as a cultural, collective phenomenon but as the consequences of individual insight due to sexual longings, loneliness and genius.

== Contents ==
1. Darkness and the Deep (1943) features primitive humans, apelike creatures who communicate with grunts, yelps and gestures. There is no dialogue. Fisher is keenly interested in the neuroses of primitive man as the prime influence of human psychology. Wuh, the young genius, invents a form of primitive language. His woman, Murah, also rises above the routines of procreation, eating and killing. In the end, the first feeling of compassion in the world is dimly realized.
2. The Golden Rooms (1944) occurs one million years later. It highlights the battle between two advanced primate species - Neanderthal and Cro-Magnon - and the first inklings of racial conflict. Harg, the genius Neanderthal, learns to set animal traps and make fire. These feats elevate him to leadership in his clan. Gode, the Cro Magnon, tames a wolf, makes the first cave paintings and after a deadly conflict with Harg's clan, initiates the first race war. He initiates the rite of burial out of fear of a new concept, the ghost. Women, givers and keepers of life, care little about such impractical ideas. But because no one has linked sex and procreation, women are slowly attaining power through the miracle of birth.
3. Intimations of Eve (1946) portrays a matriarchal society. Women rule the clan along with the Moon Woman. The "ghost" concept introduced in the previous novel now consumes the people of this time. Every accident, death, storm or bad dream are ghost induced. The neurotic genius is Raven, who chafes under the rule of the powerful old woman. He conceives the amulet as a means to ward off ghosts (the practical women consider it silly), conceives the first canoe and in a brilliant revelation, concludes that the Moon Woman was the first woman. He believes he can direct ghosts, pray to the Moon Woman, and realizes that ghosts hurt people due to individual - not collective - wrongs. This will lead to the concept of original sin.
4. Adam and the Serpent (1947) features Dove, another creative yet stifled male. He is under the thumb of the female religious leader, Rainmaker. By this time, those who speak with spirits have become a separate class. Dove's conclusions are far-reaching. If the Moon was the first woman, then the Sun was the first male. Further, the sun is greater than the moon (symbolically placing man over women). He also grasps that men are required for children. Eventually he identifies evil spirits as exclusively female, establishing a nascent religious rationale for the subjugation of women. Fisher considers this one of the most important steps in the intellectual evolution of Western thought.
5. The Divine Passion (1948) presents a triumphant patriarchy. The Moon has been defeated by the Sun. Gods are given human attributes. They are petty, vengeful, greedy, demanding and angry, seeking praise like worldly rulers. Rabi, the self-doubting oracle, is the spiritual leader of a small tribe who will develop into Hebrews. Adom, rich, greedy and desiring women, is the village leader. Narda, his shrewd wife, speaks for all oppressed women. Beth, his dutiful, uncomplaining wife, represents Mother Earth. But it is Yescha, a wild prophet who sees himself as the real oracle, who comes to dominate the intellectual story. His novel idea that women are the source of all evil eventually triumphs. The rites of Passover, atonement, sacrifice, circumcision and other religious elements are introduced.
6. The Valley of Vision (1951) is the first "historical" novel. Solomon kills his brother, the rightful heir, and becomes king of the Hebrews, a nomadic tribe with a desert, warrior god, Yah. Solomon, unlike his father David, is vain and cosmopolitan after glory and wealth. His unwillingness to follow tradition and pollute the tribe with outside influences brings the wrath of Ahijah, the prophet. Khate, a wife of Solomon, is the voice of philosophical inquiry. An Egyptian, she believes in one god who is both male and female, and finds it strange that the Hebrews alone have no female god. An appendix details the author's research.
7. The Island of the Innocent is the story of the Maccabean revolt. A second internal conflict arises between traditional Jews and those who accept outside (Greek) influences. The Greek Philemon and the Jewish Judith epitomize this conflict. The novel is one of ideas and many conversations are platforms for Fisher's views. Amiel, the harsh priest, writes the book of Daniel. He stresses Israel's uniqueness with Yahweh, and becomes convinced that a Messiah will come who will lead Israel to victory and glory. This belief becomes a dominating influence over the next two centuries.
8. Jesus Came Again: A Parable (1956) is the most controversial in the series. The tale of "Joshua" is not the biblical tale but what Fisher imagines might have happened. Messianic hopes are widespread as candidates rise, only to fail and die. Almost by accident, Joshua, a disciple of Rabbi Hillel, draws followers with the radical message that God is love. The Messiah will rule by righteousness, not military force. Joshua's mother strictly follows the law and berates his beliefs and female companions. Sirena, a female follower (and strong woman), bemoans the mistreatment of women and fears that a peaceful Messiah will not last. At the end, a rumor spreads that the crucified Joshua was the Messiah.
9. A Goat for Azazel is a search for Christian origins. When Damon's Christian mother bravely endures the fires of Nero, he undertakes a quest for the truth of her religion. The wildly divergent sects he encounters share one belief: The Lord will return "soon". Years pass and sects adopt elements of the local religion until it is indistinguishable from them. A virgin birth, miracles, death and resurrection, church offices - elements shared by all Roman religions - are added. After two Christian women he marries a pagan, Ayla. They find a crude tale (Mark) then others appear - details supplied by the "Holy Spirit". He finally sees that the only common Christian belief is hatred of Jews and at last understands that whether Jesus the rabbi ever existed is unimportant; he has been replaced by a savior god like Zeus or Horus.
10. Peace Like a River is a story of Christian ascetics. Hareb, a dour Christian, believes all pleasure is satanic. Against his wishes, David, his Christian son, loves the slave Helene. Although he manages to free her, he is caught. She flees to the desert and find bizarre sects, each claiming the "Christian" mantle. Helene, sharp-tongued, beautiful and intelligent, meets Mark, a meek man who takes religion lightly. Hareb appears to "wrestle with the devil" by resisting the world's most beautiful whore, Thais. He fails, castrates himself and Thais flees to the desert for eternal solitude in a small cell. David, tortured, scarred and unrecognizable, arrives and attacks Mark whom Helene defends as a good man. In the end, Helene and Mark leave for Nicaea and the famous council. The break with Judaism is complete; Jesus, the Jewish peasant, has become a divine god called the Christ.
11. My Holy Satan is partly based on historical events. It contains disturbing descriptions of torture. The Church teaches that knowledge is of the Devil and guards against learning, citing Scripture as proof. Richard, a serf, manages to buy his freedom and sets out on the road to self-discovery. The novel's two priests are diametric opposites: Father Daoul is caring and good; Father Luce is evil, fanatical and corrupt. Richard falls in love but the woman is impregnated by Father Luce who murders her when she becomes pregnant (a true story). He is befriended by the Jewish doctor of the local baron whose wife seduces Richard. On charges of associating with Jews, Richard is sent to the Inquisition. He dreamily retains hope in a loving Jesus even as his earnest torturers declare their devotion to Christ by practicing sadistic torture.
12. Orphans in Gethsemane (1961), located in the present, is a barely disguised autobiography. The work is divided into two parts - For Passion, For Heaven and The Great Confession. The first novel deals with the Western pioneer influences and especially the sexual evolution (and psychological implications) for 'Vridar' (Vardis). His life was difficult, challenged by divorce and suicide. The second book describes an intellectual journey, in particular the research, reading and discussions undertaken before writing the Testament.
