= Vardis Fisher =

American novelist (1895–1968)

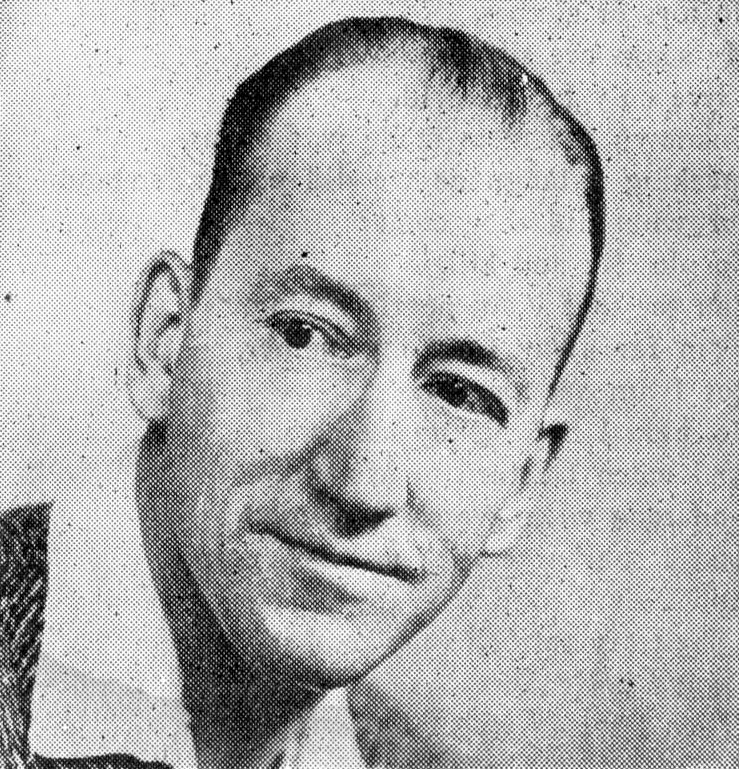
- Fisher c. 1939
- Born: March 31, 1895; Annis, Idaho, U.S.
- Died: July 9, 1968 (aged 73); Hagerman, Idaho, U.S.
- Education: University of Utah, University of Chicago
- Occupations: Author, essayist
- Spouses: Leona McMurtrey; Margaret Trusler; Opal Laurel Holmes
- Children: Grant Fisher; T. Roberts Fisher
- Writing career
- Genres: Historical novel, American Old West

Vardis Alvero Fisher (March 31, 1895 – July 9, 1968) was an American writer from Idaho who wrote popular historical novels of the Old West. After studying at the University of Utah and the University of Chicago, Fisher taught English at the University of Utah and then at the Washington Square College of New York University until 1931. He worked with the Federal Writers' Project to write the Works Project Administration The Idaho Guide, which was published in 1937. In 1939, Fisher wrote Children of God, a historical novel concerning the early Church of Jesus Christ of Latter-day Saints (LDS Church); which won the Harper Prize.

Fisher returned to his home state of Idaho in 1940 and relocated to Hagerman, where he spent the next twenty years writing the 12-volume Testament of Man (1943–1960) series of novels, depicting the history of humans from cavemen to civilization. His novel Mountain Man (1965) was adapted into the 1972 film Jeremiah Johnson, starring Robert Redford.

Fisher is often grouped with disaffected Mormon writers in Mormon fiction. Leonard Arrington and his graduate student John Haupt wrote that Fisher was sympathetic towards Mormonism, an idea that Fisher's widow, Opal Laurel Holmes, repudiated strongly. A more recent paper by Michael Austin suggests that Fisher's work was influenced by residual "scars" of his family heritage and Mormon upbringing and that these scars resulted in his incorporating into many of his novels the theme of a religious unbeliever trying to find ways to live within a religious community.

== Early life and education ==
Born on March 31, 1895, in Annis, Idaho, near Rigby, Fisher's family relocated to an isolated home in 1905. Fisher saw livestock raising firsthand, including de-horning cattle and butchering. He read many books in the Rigby library. His family was "nominally Mormon," according to Louie Attebery, professor at the College of Idaho, in A Literary History of the American West, but in Mormons and Popular Culture, Mormon literature scholar Michael Austin states that Fisher was raised by "strict Mormon parents," though the remoteness of the Fisher home prevented contact with a Mormon community. Fisher was not officially baptized into the Church of Jesus Christ of Latter-day Saints until he was 20 years old, and he abandoned the church for good soon afterward, though his mother, sister, and children all remained Mormon. "Vardis Fisher was a religious unbeliever," Austin writes, "but Mormonism was the religion that he didn't believe in."

Vardis and his brother Vivian lived with their aunt for one year while attending school in Annis. Vardis and Vivian, at ages thirteen and ten, transferred to a school in Poplar, Idaho the next year, where they lived on their own for half of the school year. They attended high school in Rigby, living in a hut built by their father. They lived off of fish and other wildlife. One of Fisher's classmates described them as wearing old-fashioned clothes and being social outcasts. Fisher graduated from Rigby High School in 1915 and began studies at the University of Utah in the same year. He married Leona McMurtrey in 1917 and often spent all his free time studying and reading. He published his first short story, "Whose Mother?" in the University of Utah student literary magazine, The University Pen, in December 1916. He published several more works in the magazine between 1916 and 1923. Fisher signed up to join the Air Force in the spring of 1918 and attended cadet school in Berkeley, California. He lost motivation when he found out that he might become a non-commissioned officer, and resigned in early summer, returning to Idaho Falls. Fisher's mother had been ordered by her doctor to relocate from Fisher Bottom to a place with a milder climate, so she moved to Idaho Falls. Fisher's father, Joe Fisher, went to auto mechanic's school in Portland, Oregon, and started an automotive shop in Idaho Falls with his brother. Fisher worked with his father and uncle in their automotive shop, and stayed there while Leona went to live with her parents in Antelope while their baby was born.

Fisher's brother, Vivian, was drafted into the army and Fisher joined him. The war ended before they were sent abroad. Fisher's military service, including his earlier air force training, was less than four months. During his last year at the University of Utah, in 1920, he wrote several plays. One of his teachers felt the plays were promising and offered him a teaching job. Fisher spent the summer studying at the University of Chicago in order to qualify for teaching at the University of Utah that fall. He found the University of Chicago intensely stimulating, writing that the library contained "all the lordly wealth of wisdom". In September 1921, Fisher returned to the University of Chicago for his MA, this time bringing his wife and child with him. One of his teachers called him a "book drunkard" and he read so much that he temporarily could not read. Leona read to him until his eyes recovered and he could afford new eyeglasses. In 1922, Fisher wrote his thesis on Daniel Defoe and graduated with his MA. He continued studying at the University of Chicago for a doctoral degree, writing his dissertation on George Meredith. Fisher received his Ph.D. magna cum laude from the University of Chicago in 1925.

== Teaching and early writing ==
Fisher started teaching at the University of Utah in 1925. He was initially nervous and insecure. He inspired a few students, including Wallace Stegner during freshman English in 1926. Stegner later wrote that Fisher "put a can opener on my head and opened up my brains." The professor was frank with students about his lack of religious belief and contempt for Mormon theology. He did not have friends among the other faculty members, and even made enemies with a few. At the time, University of Utah felt a heavy Mormon influence from faculty and administrators who were Mormon. Since he tended to stare at others, he sometimes wore dark glasses to hide the direction of his gaze. His later wife Trusler started teaching at the University of Utah in 1926. Fisher resigned from the University of Utah after accepting a position at Washington Square College of New York University, feeling that he would have been asked to resign soon anyway. He married Trusler in 1929 after they moved to New York City for his new appointment. He taught English at Washington Square College of New York University until 1931, and he became friends with Thomas Wolfe during his stay there.

Fisher began as a regionalist. His knowledge of his region's history, folkways, and dialect made him an inspiring writer, according to Attebery at the College of Idaho. Toilers of the Hills (1928) was successful, with critics calling it the first important fiction coming from the Rocky Mountain region. It was compared to Caldwell, Garland, and Cather. It was based on the life of Fisher's uncle. Frederick Manfred cited Dark Bridwall (1931) as one of the ten great novels in American literature. While it was a commercial failure, reviewers cautiously praised its "power" and "sheer living interest of humanity." The novel was compared with Thomas Hardy and William Faulkner. He taught for the summers of 1931 and 1932 at the University of Montana out of economic necessity; he was not asked to return after his second summer teaching there.

== Work at and during the Federal Writers' Project ==
In Tragic Life, the first of Fisher's autobiographical tetralogy, had many favorable reviews, and a second printing was issued by Doubleday and Caxton Press in 1933. The next two books, published in 1934 and 1935, were divisive, with critics receiving them as "sternly beautiful" or "erotic tripe." In Tragic Life sold fewer than 2000 copies, but its attention from Eastern literary critics helped Caxton establish itself as a prominent publisher of Western literature.

In 1935 Fisher accepted a job with the Federal Writers' Project, part of the Works Progress Administration, and wrote most of The Idaho Guide. There were few other writers in Idaho who could help him with the project and his superiors were surprisingly ignorant of Idaho's features and at one point ordered him to remove all photos of potatoes, Idaho's best-known crop. Fisher received help from high school students, who provided obscure information about remote locations. Fisher was determined to be the first state writer's project director to publish his state's guide, figuring that the first guide would receive the most review space in newspapers. His guide, published in January 1937, was the first from the Federal Writers' Project to be published. Even Alsberg, the project's director who had tried to delay the book's release, used it as a model for other state directors. Fisher saw the government as wasting resources in bureaucracy, and felt that the eastern United States saw the West as a source of wealth to be exploited. Fisher published two more books in his position as project director and resigned from the Federal Writers' Project in 1939.

In 1937, Doubleday published April: A Fable of Love. The novel was Fisher's favorite of the books he had written. The fantasy, set in Antelope country, focused on an introverted girl's life. Doubleday also published Fisher's Forgive Us Our Virtues (1938). Neither book sold well and Doubleday stopped publishing Fisher's works.

In 1939, Fisher's Children of God won the Harper Prize, which included a cash prize that Fisher used to build a home in Hagerman. The book was his most popular, outselling all his previous books combined, and was still in print in 1989. Frederick M. Smith, president of the Reorganized Church of Jesus Christ of Latter Day Saints, strongly repudiated the book in the Kansas City Times. In the LDS Church, John A. Widtsoe wrote an unpublished review of the book where he criticized Fisher's portrayal of Joseph Smith and Brigham Young in 1939. Widtsoe, knowing that his position as an apostle in the church would make his review appear to be an official position of the LDS Church, asked the first presidency if he should publish the review. The first presidency decided against publishing the review, and Children of God was not reviewed or mentioned in any official church publication. Darryl F. Zanuck purchased the movie rights to the book, but only to prevent a lawsuit in the screenwriting of Brigham Young (1940).

Mormon literary critic Michael Austin called Children of God "one of the most influential novels about Mormonism ever published." Carl Van Doren, one of the Harper prize judges, said that the book was neither anti-Mormon invective nor pro-Mormon hagiography. Terryl Givens called Children of God an "immense success". Givens wrote that Fisher presents Joseph Smith as a simple but likable man, and Brigham Young as "pragmatic and decisive;" a successful portrayal of the way adversity solidified bonds between early Saints. The book ends after the practice of polygamy is officially ended, with members who want to still practice polygamy moving to Canada or Mexico.

== Testament of Man ==
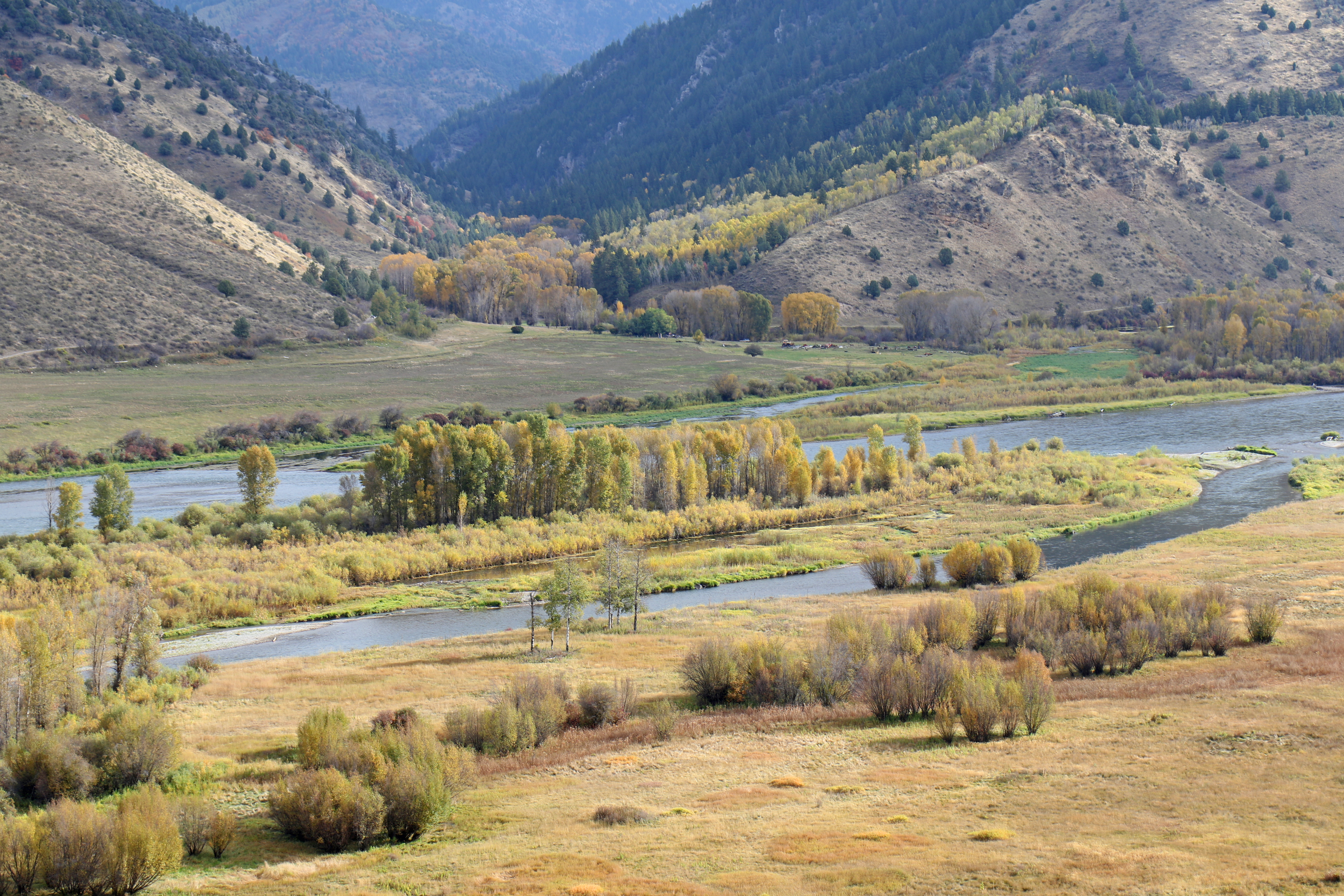
Part of the Fisher land near the south fork of the Snake River

In 1940, Fisher moved to Hagerman, Idaho with his third wife. There he started his Testament of Man series, an epic series spanning twelve volumes and tracing the development of the human race from prehistoric times, culminating in another autobiographical work, Orphans of Gethsemane. He read over 2,000 scholarly books in his research on the history and development of the human race for the Testament of Man series. Writing the 12 unsuccessful books took 20 years, and readers disliked the long, rambling digressions. Vanguard Press published volumes one through five; Abelard published the sixth and seven, and Alan Swallow published volumes eight through twelve. J. H. Gipson, a publisher at Caxton Printers, published In Tragic Life, which was somewhat successful. Caxton printers had published The Idaho Guide, and Gipson and Fisher were friends until Gipson refused to print Jesus Came Again: A Parable, the eighth novel of the twelve-volume epic. Alan Swallow offered to publish the remaining volumes, focusing on special signed and numbered editions to help offset printing costs. All twelve novels in the series have been out of print for decades.

Anthropologist Marilyn Grunkemeyer stated that all the protagonists in The Testament of Man are Fisher himself. She noted that Fisher did not listen to advice from his editors and publishers in publishing the Testament of Man, resulting in poorly edited books. She described reading Orphans of Gethsemane (1960) as "one of the most difficult reading experiences of my life," stating that the book was "spiritually exhausting and emotionally toxic." She wrote that the entire twelve volumes were "a massive exposition of one of the greatest perduring male fantasies of all time." Austin wrote that the novels are "pretty good," and provided "a good sampling of the state of anthropological scholarship during his lifetime."

Fisher was named a lifetime member of the Western Literature Association.

== Non-fiction and historical novels ==
Fisher wrote various short stories and newspapers articles, mostly in the 1930s and 1940s but with a few in the 1950s and 1960s. His work appeared in Esquire, Coronet, Rocky Mountain Review, and Western Folklore. Fisher wrote a weekly column for the Idaho Statesman titled "Objection Overruled" from 1941 until 1946. After a dispute with his editor, Fisher resigned from writing at the Idaho Statesman and started writing a column for Idaho Pioneer Statewide called "Vardis Fisher Says". Fisher continued to write the column until he died. Most of his journalistic work is collected in Thomas Wolfe as I Knew Him and Other Essays, with the notable exception of "The Mormons" published in Transatlantic. Fisher has been described as a "cranky Idaho Old Rightist."

His novel Mountain Man (1965) was adapted for Sydney Pollack's film, Jeremiah Johnson (1972). The Mothers: An American Saga of Courage told the story of the Donner Party tragedy. Tale of Valor (1958) is a novel recounting the Lewis and Clark Expedition. God or Caesar? is his non-fiction book on how to write.

== Controversy over relation to Mormonism ==
Fisher was grouped with Mormon writers of the "lost generation" first described by Edward Geary in 1977. The "lost generation" was a group of writers with Mormon backgrounds who used Mormon characters or themes in their work. Many of this group did not attend the LDS Church formally but felt an affinity towards Mormonism. Their work was sympathetic to Mormons, portraying them sensitively, though Mormons themselves often saw their work as disloyal. Leonard Arrington and his graduate student, Jon Haupt, read a paper at the Association for Mormon Letters (later published as a 1978 BYU Studies article), which stated that Fisher was not an apostate and that his works reflected his Mormon background. In reaction to the Arrington and Haupt article, Fisher's widow, Opal Laurel Holmes, issued a press release that Fisher was not Mormon and that his Mormon upbringing was minimal. Michael Austin argues that Fisher has "scars" of Mormonism. Austin argues that the "type" of Fisher character in each of the 12 Testament of Man books show sympathies to religion. These characters have creative impulses that clash with religious fundamentalists. The characters of the Fisher "type" often seek to understand religion as a reaction to people close to them, much in the same way Fisher was close to his mother and first wife, both devout Mormons. Austin concludes that the characters, and by extension Fisher, are definitely influenced by the culture of the religion they reject.

== Personal life ==
Fisher married Leona McMurtrey on September 10, 1917, and their son Grant was born the next year. Their son Wayne was born in 1921. During his studies at the U of U, Fisher did not spend much time in companionship with his new wife. During their separation, Fisher was intensely jealous of any other man who interacted with Leona, often demanding details in letters about people she had spoken with. In September 1924, Fisher told his mother and Leona that he had fallen in love with fellow graduate student Margaret Trusler, and that he wanted to separate from Leona. He explained that if he stayed with Leona, it would cripple his career as a writer to make her happy. On September 8, Leona committed suicide. Fisher blamed himself for her suicide and wrote many poems to her after her death. He later called her suicide the "great crisis" of his life. Their children lived on their grandparents' ranch following Leona's death.

Fisher married Margaret Trusler on October 2, 1928. She gave birth to Thornton Fisher in February 1937. She was frequently apart from Fisher, and while Fisher disliked religion, Margaret was a Christian. In July 1936, Fisher met Opal Laurel Holmes, a competent researcher in his WPA project. They were mutually attracted to one another. Fisher divorced Margaret in 1939. Fisher married Opal Laurel Holmes on April 16, 1940, and bought land near Hagerman, Idaho, where they built their own house.

Opal Holmes was his co-author on Gold Rushes and Mining Camps of the Early American West (1968). Opal Fisher died in 1995, leaving $237,000 from her estate to the University of Idaho for the creation of a humanities professorship.

Fisher died on July 9, 1968, after drinking and overdosing on sleeping pills.

== Works ==
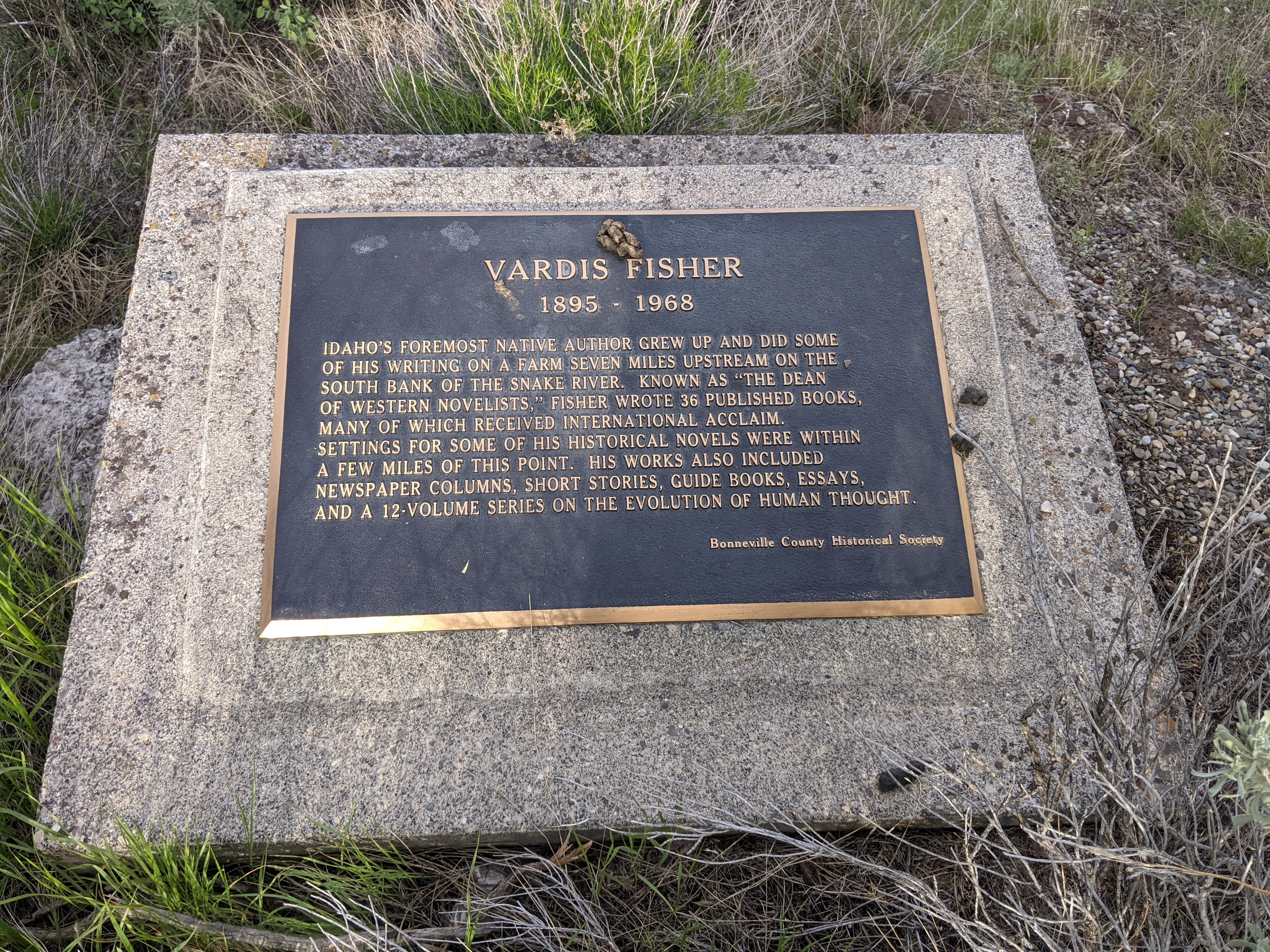
Memorial to Vardis Fisher off the Swan Valley Highway, Idaho

=== Novels ===
- Toilers of the Hills (1928)
- Dark Bridwell (1931)
- April: A Fable of Love (1937)
- Odyssey of a Hero (1937)
- Forgive Us Our Virtues: A Comedy of Evasions (1938)
- Children of God (1939)
- City of Illusion (1941)
- The Mothers: An American Saga of Courage (1943)
- Pemmican: A Novel of the Hudson's Bay Company (1956)
- Tale Of Valor: A Novel of the Louis and Clark Expedition (1958)
- Mountain Man: A Novel of Male and Female in the Early American West (1965)
- Vridar Hunter tetralogy:
  - In Tragic Life (1932)
  - Passions Spin the Plot (1934)
  - We Are Betrayed (1935)
  - No Villain Need Be (1936)
- Testament of Man series:
  - Darkness and the Deep (1943)
  - The Golden Rooms (1944)
  - Intimations of Eve (1946)
  - Adam and the Serpent (1947)
  - The Divine Passion (1948)
  - The Valley of Vision (1951)
  - The Island of the Innocent (1952)
  - Jesus Came Again: A Parable (1956)
  - A Goat for Azazel (1956)
  - Peace Like a River (1957)
  - My Holy Satan (1958)
  - Orphans in Gethsemane (pb two vols: The Great Confession and For Passion, for Heaven) (1960)

=== Short stories ===
- "Love and Death" (1959)

=== Non-fiction ===
- The Neurotic Nightingale (1935) [essays]
- Idaho: A Guide in Word and Picture (1937), as Federal Writers' Project, state director
- The Idaho Encyclopedia (1938)
- Idaho Lore (1939)
- The Caxton Printers in Idaho (1944)
- God or Caesar? The Writing of Fiction for Beginners (1953)
- Suicide or Murder: The Strange Death of Meriwether Lewis (1962)
- Thomas Wolfe As I Knew Him and Other Essays (1963)
- Gold Rushes and Mining Camps of the Early American West (1968), with Opal Laurel Holmes

=== Poetry ===
- Sonnets to an Imaginary Madonna (1927)

== See also ==
- LDS fiction
- List of atheists

== Works cited ==
- Arrington, Leonard J; Haupt, Jon (1978). "The Mormon Heritage of Vardis Fisher". BYU Studies. 18: 22.
- Attebery, Louie W. (1987). "Vardis Fisher". A Literary History of the American West. Texas Christian University Press. ISBN 9780875650210.
- Austin, Michael (2013). Hunter, J. Michael (ed.). Mormons and popular culture: the global influence of an American phenomenon. Vol. 2. Santa Barbara, Calif.: Praeger. ISBN 978-0-313-39168-2.
- Austin, Michael (2014). "Vardis Fisher's Mormon Scars: Mapping the Diaspora in the Testament of Man". Dialogue. 47 (3): 18.
- Austin, Michael (2021). Vardis Fisher: A Mormon Novelist. University of Illinois. ISBN 9780252086144.
- Bleiler, Everett (1948). The Checklist of Fantastic Literature. Chicago: Shasta Publishers. p. 115.
- Flora, Joseph M., ed. (2000). Rediscovering Vardis Fisher: Centennial Essays. Moscow, Idaho: University of Idaho Press. ISBN 0-89301-223-8.
- Givens, Terryl C. (2007). People of paradox : a history of Mormon culture. New York: Oxford University Press. ISBN 978-0-19-516711-5.
- Grunkemeyer, Marilyn Trent (2000). "An Anthropological View of the Testament of Man". In Flora, Joseph M. (ed.). Rediscovering Vardis Fisher: Centennial Essays. Moscow, Idaho: University of Idaho Press. ISBN 0-89301-223-8.
- Woodward, Tim (1989). Tiger on the Road: The Life of Vardis Fisher. Caldwell, Idaho: Caxton Printers.
