= Liver-Eating Johnson =

Mountain man of the American Old West

John Liver-Eating Johnson
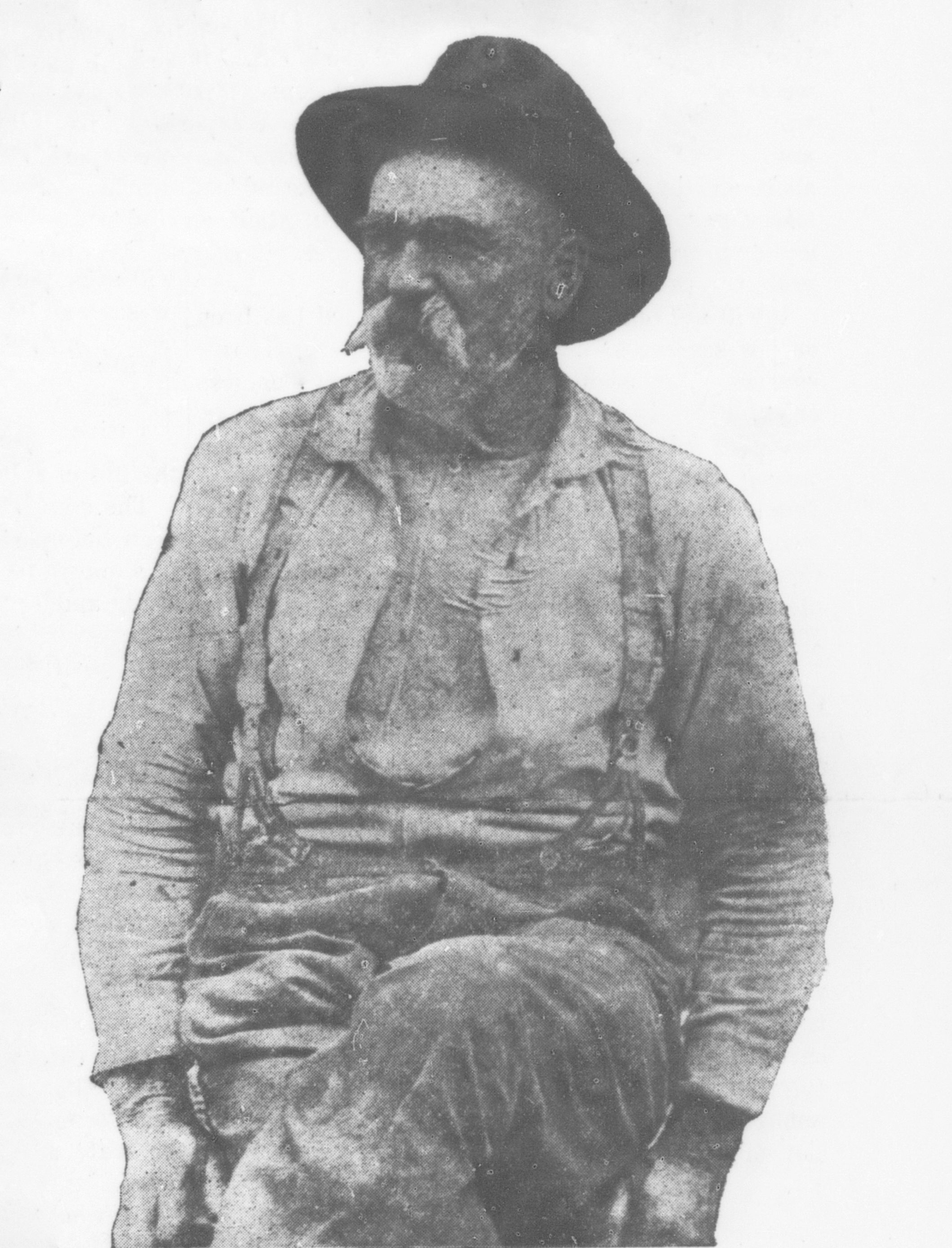
- John Jeremiah Johnson
- Born: John Jeremiah Garrison Johnston; July 1, 1824; Hickory Tavern area, near Pattenburg, New Jersey, US
- Died: January 21, 1900 (aged 75); Santa Monica, California, US
- Other name: Garrison
- Occupation: Mountain Man

John "Liver-Eating" Johnson, born John Jeremiah Garrison Johnston (July 1, 1824 – January 21, 1900), was a mountain man of the American Old West. He gained notoriety for a conflict he had with the Crow people. After a group of Crow hunters killed his Native American wife, he started a decades-long vendetta of killing Crow individuals and eating their livers.

== Biography ==
Johnson is said to have been born with the last name Garrison, in the area of the Hickory Tavern near Pattenburg, New Jersey. During the Mexican–American War he served aboard a fighting ship. After striking an officer, he deserted, changed his name to Johnson, and travelled West to try his hand at gold digging in Alder Gulch, Montana Territory. He also became a "woodhawk", supplying cord wood to steamboats.

Rumors and legends about Johnson are common. Chief among them is that in 1847, his wife, a member of the Flathead American Indian tribe, was killed by a young Crow man and his fellow hunters, which prompted Johnson to embark on a vendetta against the tribe. According to historian Andrew Mehane Southerland, "He supposedly killed and scalped more than 300 Crow Indians and then devoured their livers" to avenge the death of his wife, and "as his reputation and collection of scalps grew, Johnson became an object of fear".

Accounts say that he would cut out and eat the liver of each Crow killed. This led to his being known as "Liver-Eating Johnson". One tale ascribed to Johnson (while other sources ascribe it to Boone Helm) is that while on a foray of over five hundred miles (800 km) in the winter to sell whiskey to his Flathead kin, he was ambushed by a group of Blackfoot warriors.

The Blackfoot planned to sell Johnson to the Crow, his mortal enemies. He was stripped to the waist, tied with leather thongs and put in a teepee with one guard. Johnson managed to break through the straps. He then knocked out the guard with a kick, took his knife and scalped him. He escaped into the woods and fled to the cabin of Del Gue, his trapping partner, a journey of about two hundred miles (320 km).

Eventually, Johnson made peace with the Crow, who became "his brothers", and his personal vendetta against them finally ended after 25 years and scores of slain Crow warriors. However, the West was still very violent and territorial, particularly during the Plains Indian Wars of the mid-19th century. Many more Indians of different tribes, especially but not limited to the Sioux and the Blackfoot, would know the wrath of "Dapiek Absaroka" Crow killer and his fellow mountain men.

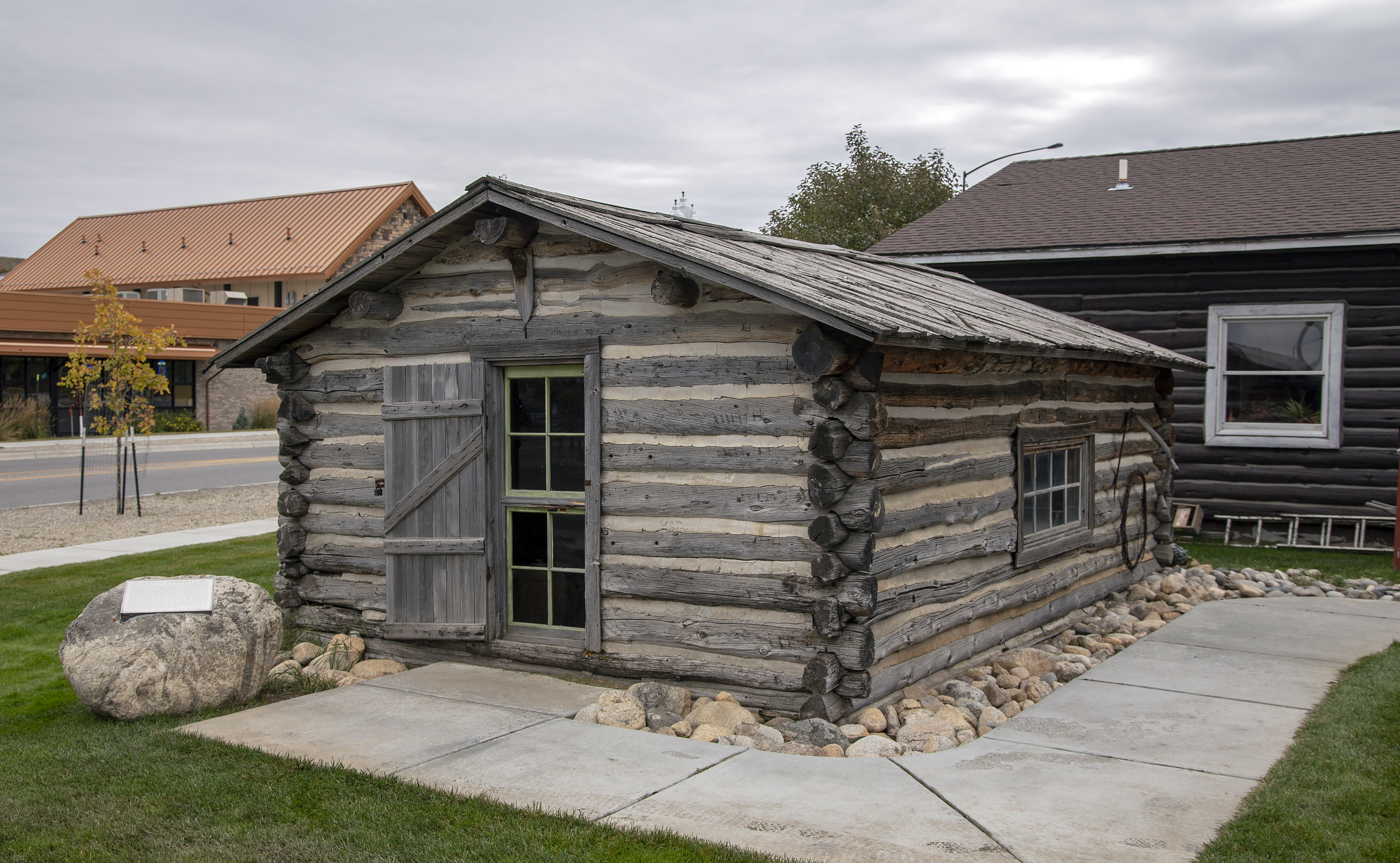
The cabin inhabited by Johnson in the 1880s in Montana, moved into Red Lodge, Montana and on display at the tourism office

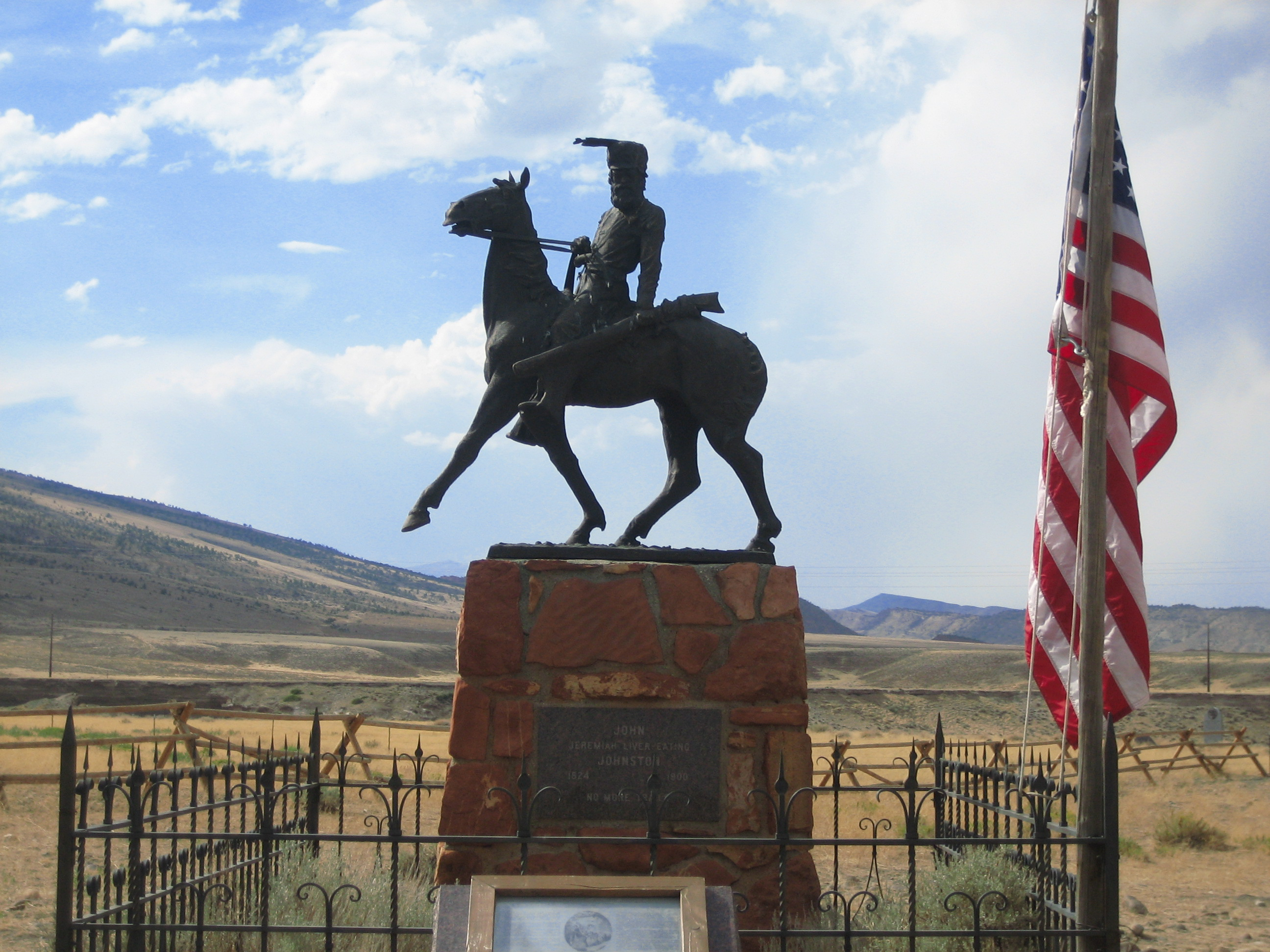
A bronze statue of Liver-Eating Johnson erected over his grave at Old Trail Town in Cody, Wyoming.

In 1864, Johnson joined Company H, 2nd Colorado Cavalry, of the Union Army in St. Louis as a private and was honorably discharged the following year. During the 1880s, he was appointed deputy sheriff in Coulson, Montana, and a town marshal in Red Lodge, Montana. In his time he was a sailor, scout, soldier, gold seeker, hunter, trapper, woodhawk, whiskey peddler, guide, deputy, constable, and log cabin builder, taking advantage of any source of income-producing labor he could find.

His final residence was in a veterans’ home in Santa Monica, California, where he died on January 21, 1900. His body was buried in a Los Angeles veterans' cemetery. In 1974, after a six-month campaign by 25 seventh-grade students and their teacher, who did not believe he should be laid to rest among urban sprawl, Johnson's remains were relocated to Cody, Wyoming. His epitaph reads "No More Trails".

== In works ==
Jeremiah Johnson is a 1972 film by Sydney Pollack starring Robert Redford depicting his life.

== See also ==
- List of incidents of cannibalism
