= Canícula: Snapshots of a Girlhood en la Frontera =

Canícula: Snapshots of a Girlhood en la Frontera is a semi-autobiographical work by Norma Elía Cantú, published in 1995 by Albuquerque: University of New Mexico Press. The book tells the story of Cantú’s childhood and adolescence and her community in the borderlands of Laredo, Mexico and Nuevo Laredo, Texas. Canícula utilizes a distinct structure and is framed by Cantú's family photographs from which the prose unfolds in a series of vignettes. The book has been discussed in various Latino scholarly journals for its depiction of life on the borderlands (Note: The phrases 'en la frontera' and 'borderlands' refer to the space along the U.S.-Mexico border where communities, families, and cultures often exist between both sides of the line.) and was awarded the Premio Aztlan Literary Prize in 1995.

== Summary ==
Canícula: Snapshots of a Girlhood en la Frontera is a coming-of-age story of author Norma Elía Cantú, told through themes of family, identity-making, and cultural rituals. Framed by a series of family photographs, Cantú includes a wide cast of characters from her extended family. The book creates a portrait of the wider community by the description of cultural and family events including weddings, Día de los Muertos, birthdays, funerals, communions, Azucena's quinceañera, Christmas posadas and Nochebuena. Beyond notable events, the prose is filled with the details that made up everyday life for Azucena, such as dresses handmade by her mother, foods like picadillo guisado, and childhood injuries healed by homemade balms. Additionally, Cantú centers attention on the experience of women in the novel, with vignettes portraying the racialized tensions about puberty between girls at a mixed-race school, young women encouraged to adopt 'ladylike' posture and etiquette, older cousins shamed for illegitimate children, and women entrapped in marriages with disloyal husbands.

== Structure ==
=== Genre ===
In addition to functioning as an autobiography, Canícula includes fictional and ethnographic elements. Author Norma Elía Cantú describes the book as belonging to the genre of “fictionalized autobioethnography,” as a refusal to frame it within only autobiography, only fiction, or only ethnography. She noted that her experience writing in a variety of genres influenced the diversified nature of this book. All photographs included are all Cantú’s family photos. The central character of the narrative, however, is not Cantú herself but Azucena. This character is fictionalized, though it is used as a representative of Cantú in her adolescence. With its ethnographic elements, Canícula depicts not only Cantú’s family, but the nature of life in the borderlands of U.S. and Mexico. Cantú noted that one purpose behind the writing of this work was to bring more representation to the culture of the borderlands and discuss issues of social justice in that place.

=== The Use of Photographs ===
Based on photographs and memory, Canícula differs from traditional structure. Rather than chapters, the book is made up of short segments of prose, or ‘snapshots’. Although some of these snapshots are paired together with shared settings and characters, the larger work is not ordered chronologically, and follows no direct plot-line. Cantú described her intention behind the nonchronological structure, writing “life doesn’t happen in neat little packages, I wanted a narrative that, like my memory, worked in a recursive and overlapping fashion,” in the essay "The Writing of Canícula". Photographs orient the text in memory of real events, from which the prose expands on and, at times, fictionalizes. Cantú has referenced the influences of Susan Sontag’s and Roland Barthes’ theories of photography on her use of the medium in Canícula.

== Scholarly reception ==
In academic discussions of the interaction of identity and place in the borderlands, as well as representation of women en la frontera, Canícula has frequently been used as a primary object of study or frame of reference for the Chicana literary tradition for its foregrounding of female characters and detailed illustration of culture en la frontera. Authors have considered its representation of life on the borderlands as an example of an alternative depiction to what some have described as traditional imagery of "cowboys" and "Anglo heroism". Other scholars have situated the work in the context of decolonization studies, framing its focus on Chicana women and families as a reclamation of the narrative of the Southwest. The work has also generated discussion around the distinction of autobiography from autobiographical fiction, due to its unique position between genres. Studies of the book appear in journals including Geographies of Girlhood in U.S. Latina Writing, Biography: An Interdisciplinary Quarterly, The Society for the Study of the Multi-Ethnic Literature of the United States, Latino Studies, Hispanic Journal, Arizona Journal of Hispanic Cultural Studies, and Chicana/Latina Studies: The Journal of Mujeres Activas en Letras y Cambio Social. (Note: This is not an exhaustive list.)

The book has been reviewed by publications in the U.S. and Mexico, including Voices of Mexico, a publication from Universidad Nacional Autónoma de México. In 1995, Canícula was awarded the Premio Aztlan Literary Prize by the National Hispanic Cultural Center. The Prize centers on Chicana and Chicano authors, and Canícula was the third work to win it after its formation in 1993.
