= The Nature of Truth =

2014 novel by Sergio Troncoso

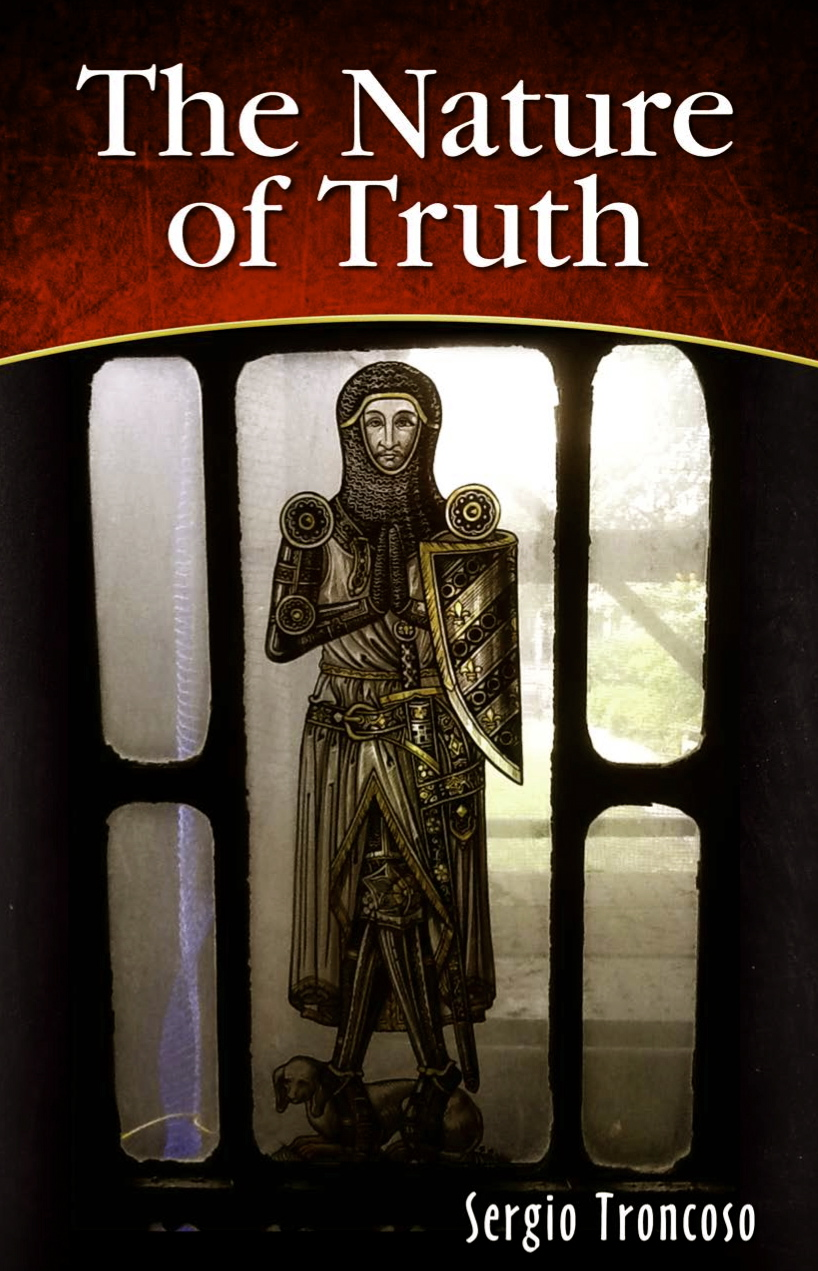
- Author: Sergio Troncoso
- Language: English
- Genre: Philosophical novel
- Publisher: Arte Público Press
- Publication date: March 2014
- Publication place: United States
- Media type: Print (Paperback)
- Pages: 261 pp
- ISBN: 978-1-55885-791-9
- OCLC: 51867902
- Dewey Decimal: 813/.54 21
- LC Class: PS3570.R5876 N38 2014

The Nature of Truth is a novel by Sergio Troncoso first published in 2003 by Northwestern University Press. It explores righteousness and evil, Yale and the Holocaust. Arte Público Press published a revised and updated paperback edition of Troncoso's novel in 2014.

== Plot summary ==
Helmut Sanchez is a young researcher in the employ of renowned Yale professor Werner Hopfgartner. By chance, Helmut discovers a letter written decades ago by his boss mocking guilt over the Holocaust. Appalled, Helmut digs into the scholar's life and travels to Austria and Italy to uncover evidence of Hopfgartner's hateful past. Meanwhile, Hopfgartner's colleague and rival, Regina Neumann, wants to reveal the truth about Hopfgartner's sexual liaisons with vulnerable students before the professor's imminent retirement. Neumann traps Sarah Goodman, an insecure graduate student trying to find her place at Yale, into initiating formal charges of sexual harassment against Hopfgartner. Soon Helmut's intellectual quest for the truth metamorphoses into a journey of justice and blood, one with unforeseen consequences.

== Characters in "The Nature of Truth" ==
- Helmut Sanchez – the researcher, protagonist
- Ariane Sassolini – Helmut's girlfriend
- Werner Hopfgartner – Helmut's university employer
- Sarah Goodman – Hopfgartner's graduate student
- Regina Neumann – Hopfgartner's colleague and rival
- Jonathan Atwater – Helmut's library friend
- Jack Rosselli – New Haven Detective

== Main themes ==
Troncoso's novel explores how a man of Mexican-German heritage navigates a complex moral universe, and how his experience reveals the differences and links between righteousness and evil in the quest for the truth. In an interview for Prime Number Journal in 2015, Troncoso said: "I had read Heidegger as a graduate student at Yale, and Being and Time was fascinating to me, particularly the concept of Being-towards-death....I was always shocked by the intellectual violence I witnessed at many Ivy League seminars, how people would just eviscerate each other with words, in pursuit of 'The Truth,' and how often they would lose themselves in these arguments. They would lose their humanity, in my opinion....I did not want to lose myself as a philosopher, and lose my heritage, and lose my humanity. I wanted to write a novel about someone wrestling with these issues of morality and identity, someone picking and choosing where he goes and who he is, a moral actor stumbling badly as he is consumed by the pursuit of 'The Truth,' and then finding himself with the help of friends."

== Literary significance & criticism ==
A reviewer from Prime Number Journal wrote: "Sergio Troncoso's first novel—recently revised, expanded, and rereleased by Arte Publico Press—is a daring departure from the personal essays Troncoso is famed for....The Nature of Truth is not a thriller in the sense of pulp fiction; no, Troncoso's The Nature of Truth is a thriller in the way Richard Wright's Native Son is a thriller. And it's an erudite reader's novel in the way of Philip Roth's The Human Stain is. Troncoso's work places the reader on a knife's edge of suspense, while challenging the reader to examine and question The [very] Nature of Truth, whether that truth be racially defined, intellectually constructed, or a scepter rising from ancient ideals of right and wrong....

Troncoso's The Nature of Truth informs his mature works—From This Wicked Patch of Dust and Crossing Borders: Personal Essays—as they examine the ideas of borders, their permeability, and their dualistic nature of the real and the imagined. Without the intellectual questioning of truth in The Nature of Truth, his mature works, I believe, would not have been possible. Troncoso, primarily known for his US-Mexican Border works, is, as The Nature of Truth suggests, the brightest and most able of the modern Border writers and thinkers. And somewhere in Troncoso's raising within the Border's transnational diaspora, he found that the nature of truth can only be located in the confines of the self, the family, the community, and our own definition of the truth."

A reviewer from Janus Head, a journal of Continental Philosophy, Literature, and Phenomenological Psychology, wrote: "It is with this trio [Helmut Sanchez, Ariane Sassolini, and Detective Jack Rosselli] that the author excels as both fictionist and moral epistemologist. When Helmut ventures beyond good and evil, Troncoso refuses to leave his reader behind. It is more than a liberating world, Troncoso suggests. It's also nightmarish one, inducing the worst symptoms of psychosis even in its most well-meaning inhabitants. In conveying this, Troncoso's powers of characterization and description are equal to his analytic ones: "The blade in his hand glimmered in the moonlight. He sliced into the fatty tissue of his forearm. He felt exquisite pain. Blood, hot blood, ran out of his arm. Helmut clenched his fist, and the red stream became fuller, warmer, quicker." With Ariane Sassolini, Troncoso gives us a hero for the story playing out in the novel's subtext. A scholar every bit as inquisitive as Helmut, Ariane yet comes to embody the truth that Helmut has forsaken: that conventional taboos, though conventional, serve a grand ethical purpose. When her crisis arrives, again in the form of knowledge, she must make a life-altering decision, and her one of compassion and forgiveness for Helmut betrays a moral fortitude far exceeding that of her beloved. Rosselli, on the other hand, lacks the imagination required for compassion that large. He's too mired in the data of criminology to ever truly understand the criminal. Unable to identify the real killer, motivated not by vengeance but by idealism, Rosselli allows an innocent man, Atwater, to suffer at the hands of thugs.

Clearly, then, The Nature of Truth is no allegory. All three of the characters come to embody more than a philosophic agenda. But operating within the minds of each is a set of epistemic practices that Troncoso deftly contrasts. When juxtaposed, the Nietzschean valor of Sanchez, the Christian pragmatism of Sassolini and the blind inductivism of Rosselli make for a sustained, intellectual tension that perfectly complements the narrative one. If Troncoso occasionally tips his hand, as he does when Helmut self-consciously asks "What was morality anyway?", or when the street-wise Rosselli puts forth a rather academic-sounding theory of racial division, the author is careful never to make the conflict between his characters' "truths" too explicit. The subtlety, and fairness, with which Troncoso presents these conflicting frameworks stand as the novel's crowning intellectual achievement, side by side with the artistic one: a convincing tale of murder and ruminating guilt."

A reviewer from The Forward wrote: "A sentimental tale of love triumphant over bigotry and zealotry, The Nature of Truth enables its philosemitic author to wear his heart on his sleeve, right beside an imaginary yellow star. Troncoso, who has studied and taught at Yale, portrays the campus as an intellectual enclave that tries to remain oblivious to the ambient urban blight. About the strained relationship between New Haven and Yale, he writes: "One was in the gutter, the other was in the clouds." ...

The Nature of Truth is an exploration of the ways in which lies can skew our lives. Over dinner at the end of the novel, Jonathan Atwater—a gay librarian who, like a Jew victimized by Nazi storm troopers, was assaulted by homophobic thugs—presents his theory about the decline of civilization. "Two important things have gone by the wayside, in my opinion," he says, "and I believe they've affected each other in a miserable manner. Family and truth." According to Atwater, truth, disembodied from the living communities that give it meaning, has become a vapid abstraction. The Nature of Truth concludes within the embrace of la familia, in Chicano New Mexico. But ... Troncoso recognizes that, though truth lies within the community, a failure to acknowledge the validity of other communities is the root of lethal lies."

The Nature of Truth won the Bronze Award for Multicultural Fiction from ForeWord Reviews. The novel was also chosen as one of the Top Ten Best Fiction Books for 2014 by TheLatinoAuthor.com.
