= Philosophy and literature =

Academic discipline

Philosophy and literature involves the literary treatment of philosophers and philosophical themes (the literature of philosophy), and the philosophical treatment of issues raised by literature (the philosophy of literature).

The philosophy of literature, a subset of aesthetics, examines the nature of art and the significance of verbal arts, often overlooked in traditional aesthetic discussions. It raises philosophical questions about narrative, empathy, and ethics through fictional characters. Philosophers like Plato critiqued literature's ethical influence, while modern thinkers explore language's role in bridging minds and the truth in fiction, differentiating between the reality of characters and their narratives.

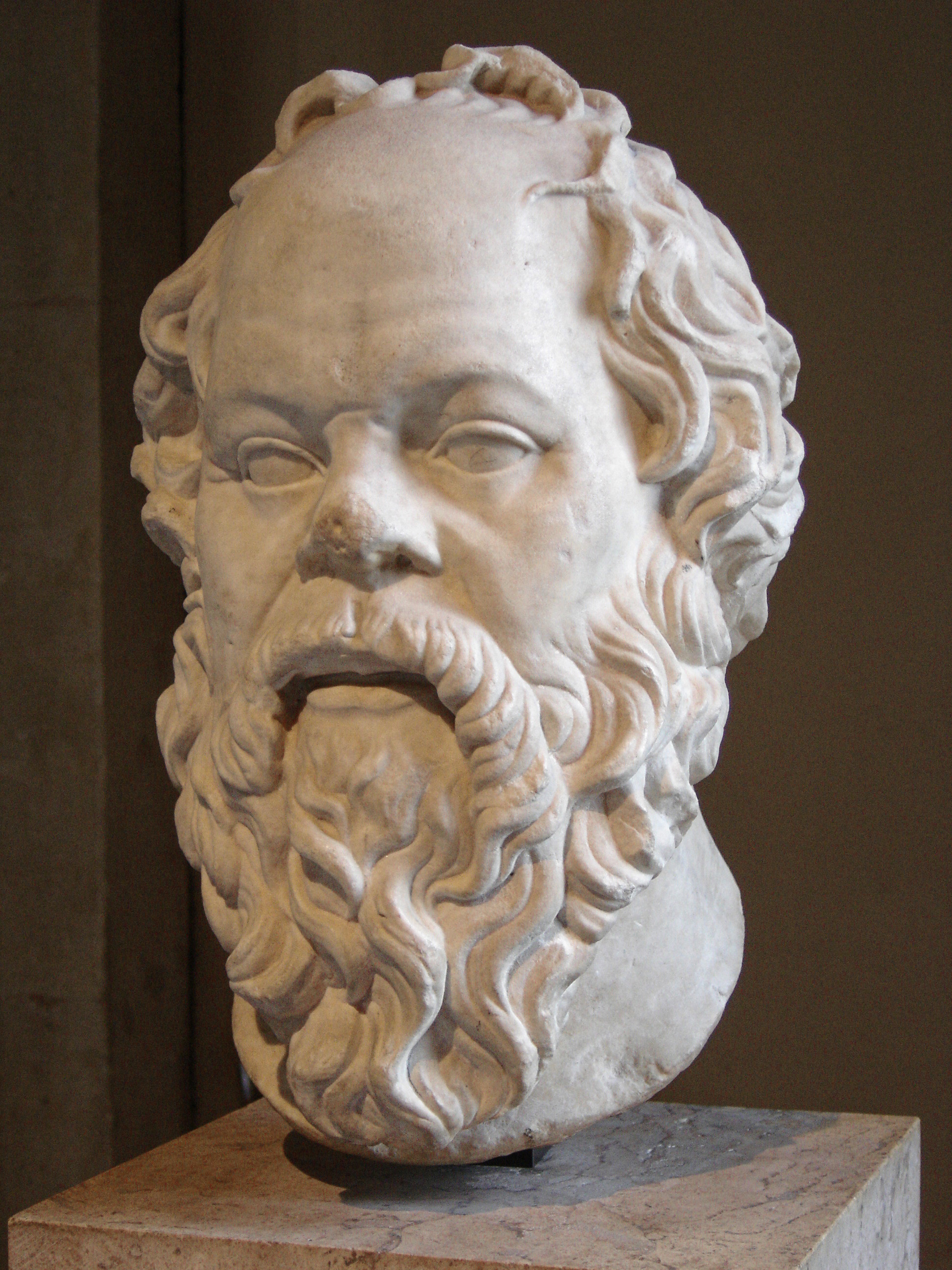
The Clouds by Aristophanes presented Socrates as a comic figure.

== The philosophy of literature ==
Strictly speaking, the philosophy of literature is a branch of aesthetics, the branch of philosophy that deals with the question, "What is art"? Much of aesthetic philosophy has traditionally focused on the plastic arts or music, however, at the expense of the verbal arts. Much traditional discussion of aesthetic philosophy seeks to establish criteria of artistic quality that are indifferent to the subject matter being depicted. Since all literary works, almost by definition, contain notional content, aesthetic theories that rely on purely formal qualities tend to overlook literature.

The very existence of narrative raises philosophical issues. In narrative, a creator can embody, and readers be led to imagine, fictional characters, and even fantastic creatures or technologies. The ability of the human mind to imagine, and even to experience empathy with, these fictional characters is itself revealing about the nature of the human mind. Some fiction can be thought of as a sort of a thought experiment in ethics: it describes fictional characters, their motives, their actions, and the consequences of their actions. It is in this light that some philosophers have chosen various narrative forms to teach their philosophy (see below).

=== Literature and language ===
Plato, for instance, believed that literary culture had a strong impact on the ethical outlook of its consumers. In The Republic, Plato displays a strong hostility to the contents of the culture of his period, and proposes a strong censorship of popular literature in his utopia.

More recently, however, philosophers of various stripes have taken different and less hostile approaches to literature. Since the work of the British Empiricists and Immanuel Kant in the late eighteenth century, Western philosophy has long been preoccupied with a fundamental question of epistemology: the relationship between ideas in the human mind and the external world, if such a world exists. In more recent years, these epistemological concerns have shifted toward an extended discussion of words and meaning, exploring the possibility of language bridging the gap between minds. This cluster of issues concerning the meaning of language and "writings" is sometimes referred to as the linguistic turn.

As such, techniques and tools developed for literary criticism and literary theory rose to greater prominence in Western philosophy of the late twentieth century. Philosophers of various stripes paid more attention to literature than their predecessors did. Some sought to examine the question of whether it was in fact truly possible to communicate using words, whether it was possible for an author's intended meaning to be communicated to a reader. Others sought to use literary works as examples of contemporary culture, and sought to reveal unconscious attitudes they felt present in these works for social criticism.

=== The truth of fiction ===
Literary works also pose issues concerning truth and the philosophy of language. In educated opinion, at least, it is commonly reputed as true that Sherlock Holmes lived in London. (see David Lewis 'Truth in Fiction', American Philosophical Quarterly, Vol. 15. No. 1, January 1978) It is also considered true that Samuel Pepys lived in London. Yet Sherlock Holmes never lived anywhere at all; he is a fictional character. Samuel Pepys, contrarily, is judged to have been a real person. Contemporary interests in Holmes and Pepys share strong similarities; the only reason why anyone knows either of their names is because of an abiding interest in reading about their alleged deeds and words. These two statements would appear to belong to two different orders of truth. Further problems arise concerning the truth value of statements about fictional worlds and characters that can be implied but are nowhere explicitly stated by the sources for our knowledge about them, such as Sherlock Holmes had only one head or Sherlock Holmes never traveled to the moon.

== The literature of philosophy ==
=== Philosophical poems ===
Several poets have written poems on philosophical themes, and some important philosophers have expressed their philosophy in verse. The cosmogony of Hesiod and the De Rerum Natura of Lucretius are important philosophical poems. The genre of epic poetry was also used to teach philosophy. Vyasa narrated the ancient Indian epic Mahabharata in order to teach Indian philosophy and Hindu philosophy. Homer also presented some philosophical teachings in his Odyssey.

Many of the Eastern philosophers worked out their thought in a poetical fashion. Some of the important names include:

- Vyasa
- Laozi
- Jalal ad-Din Muhammad Rumi
- Omar Khayyám
- Al-Ma'arri
- Nizami Ganjavi
- Sheikh Saadi
- Hafiz Shirazi
- Muhammad Iqbal
- Matsuo Bashō
- Farid ud-Din Attar
- Salah Abdel Sabour
- Mahmoud Darwish

Notable Western philosophical poets include:

- John Ashbery
- Georges Bataille
- Giannina Braschi
- G. K. Chesterton
- Robert Creeley
- Samuel Taylor Coleridge
- T. S. Eliot
- Homer
- Søren Kierkegaard
- Lucretius
- John Milton
- Marianne Moore
- Pablo Neruda
- Friedrich Nietzsche
- Mary Oliver
- Fernando Pessoa
- Rainer Maria Rilke
- Percy Bysshe Shelley
- St. John of the Cross
- Leslie Marmon Silko
- Hildegard von Bingen
- William Carlos Williams
- C. K. Williams
- James Wright

=== Philosophical fiction ===
Some philosophers have undertaken to write philosophy in the form of fiction, including novels and short stories (see separate article on philosophical fiction). This is apparent early on in the literature of philosophy, where philosophers such as Plato wrote dialogues in which fictional or fictionalized characters discuss philosophical subjects; Socrates frequently appears as a protagonist in Plato's dialogues, and the dialogues are one of the prime sources of knowledge about Socrates' teaching, though at this remove it is sometimes hard to distinguish Socrates' actual positions from Plato's own. Numerous early Christian writers, including Augustine, Boethius, and Peter Abelard produced dialogues; several early modern philosophers, such as George Berkeley and David Hume, wrote occasionally in this genre.

Some philosophers have turned to storytelling to convey their teachings. The 12th century Islamic philosopher Ibn Tufayl wrote a fictional Arabic narrative Hayy ibn Yaqdhan as a response to al-Ghazali's The Incoherence of the Philosophers; the 13th century Islamic theologian-philosopher Ibn al-Nafis later wrote a fictional narrative Theologus Autodidactus as a response to Ibn Tufayl's work. The German philosopher Friedrich Nietzsche often articulated his ideas in literary modes, most notably in Thus Spoke Zarathustra, a re-imagined account of the teachings of Zoroaster. Marquis de Sade and Ayn Rand wrote novels in which characters served as mouthpieces for philosophical positions, and acted by them in the plot. George Santayana was also a philosopher who wrote novels and poetry; the relationship between Santayana's characters and his beliefs is more complex. The existentialists include among their numbers important French authors who used fiction to convey their philosophical views; these include Jean-Paul Sartre's novel Nausea and play No Exit, and Albert Camus's The Stranger. Maurice Blanchot's entire fictional production, whose titles include The Step Not Beyond, The Madness of the Day, and The Writing of Disaster, among others, constitutes an indispensable corpus for the treatment of the relationship between philosophy and literature. So does Jacques Derrida's The Post Card: From Socrates to Freud and Beyond.

Several philosophers have had an important influence on literature. Arthur Schopenhauer, largely as a result of his system of aesthetics, is perhaps the most influential recent philosopher in the history of literature; Thomas Hardy's later novels frequently allude to Schopenhauerian themes, particularly in Jude the Obscure. Schopenhauer also had an important influence on Joseph Conrad. Schopenhauer also had a less specific but more widely diffused influence on the Symbolist movement in European literature. Lionel Johnson also refers to Schopenhauer's aesthetics in his essay The Cultured Faun. Jacques Derrida's entire oeuvre has been hugely influential for so-called continental philosophy and the understanding of the role of literature in modernity.

Other works of fiction considered to have philosophical content include:

- Joseph Conrad, Heart of Darkness
- Fyodor Dostoevsky, Brothers Karamazov and Crime and Punishment
- Jostein Gaarder, Sophie's World
- Hermann Hesse, The Glass Bead Game
- James Joyce, Ulysses
- Franz Kafka, The Metamorphosis
- Milan Kundera, The Unbearable Lightness of Being
- Thomas Mann, The Magic Mountain
- Iris Murdoch, The Sea, the Sea
- Robert M. Pirsig, Zen and the Art of Motorcycle Maintenance
- Marcel Proust, In Search of Lost Time
- Dante Alighieri, Divine Comedy
- William Shakespeare, Macbeth and Hamlet
- Leo Tolstoy, The Death of Ivan Ilyich and War and Peace
- Sergio Troncoso, The Nature of Truth
- Marguerite Yourcenar, Memoirs of Hadrian

=== Philosophical writing as literature ===
Several philosophers are read for the literary merits of their works apart from their philosophical content. The philosophy in the Meditations of the Roman emperor Marcus Aurelius is unoriginal Stoicism, but the Meditations are still read for their literary merit and for the insight they give into the workings of the emperor's mind.

Arthur Schopenhauer's philosophy is noted for the quality and readability of its prose, as are some of the works of the British Empiricists, such as Locke and Hume. Søren Kierkegaard's style is frequently regarded as poetic artistry as well as philosophical, especially in Fear and Trembling and Either/Or. Friedrich Nietzsche's works such as Thus Spoke Zarathustra frequently resemble prose poetry and contain imagery and allusion instead of argument.

== Philosophy in literature ==
=== Philosophers in literature ===
Socrates appears in a highly fictionalized guise, as a comic figure and the object of mockery, in The Clouds by Aristophanes. In the play, Socrates appears hanging from a basket, where he delivers oracles such as:

I'd never come up with a single thing
about celestial phenomena,
if I did not suspend my mind up high,
to mix my subtle thoughts with what's like them—
the air. If I turned my mind to lofty things,
but stayed there on the ground, I'd never make
the least discovery. For the earth, you see,
draws moist thoughts down by force into itself—
the same process takes place with watercress.

Early Taoist philosopher Zhuang Zhou expressed his ideas primarily through short literary anecdotes and fables such as "Dream of the Butterfly". The other major philosophers of the time appear as characters within these stories, allowing Zhuangzi to playfully explore their ideas and contrast them with his own, as he does with Laozi, Liezi, Hui Shi, and many others. Most prominently in his work is the presence of Confucius and his prominent disciples, who are sometimes used to undermine popular understandings of Confucian philosophy or to reinforce Zhuangzi's own understanding of how one lives by the Dao.

Jorge Luis Borges is perhaps the twentieth century's preeminent author of philosophical fiction. He wrote a short story in which the philosopher Averroes is the chief protagonist, Averroes's Search. Many plot points in his stories paraphrase the thought of philosophers, including George Berkeley, Arthur Schopenhauer, and Bertrand Russell; he also attributes various opinions to figures including George Dalgarno.

A key plot point in Umberto Eco's novel The Name of the Rose turns on the discovery of a mysterious book that turns out to contain a lost manuscript by Aristotle. Eco's later novel Foucault's Pendulum became the forerunner of a run of thrillers or detective fiction that toss around learned allusions and the names of historical thinkers; more recent examples include Dan Brown's The Da Vinci Code and The Rule of Four by Ian Caldwell and Dustin Thomason.

Also, Philip K. Dick, who has often been compared to Borges, raises a significant number of philosophical issues in his novels, everything from the problem of solipsism to many questions of perception and reality.

=== Fictional philosophers ===
Jorge Luis Borges introduces many philosophical themes, and several fictional philosophers, in his short stories. A fictional philosophical movement is a part of the premise of his story Tlön, Uqbar, Orbis Tertius, and the unnamed narrator of his story The Library of Babel could also be called a fictional philosopher. A fictional theologian is the subject of his story Three Versions of Judas.

Fictional philosophers occasionally occur throughout the works of Robert A. Heinlein and Ray Bradbury. Heinlein's Stranger in a Strange Land contains long passages that could be considered successors to the fictionalized philosophical dialogues of the ancient world, set within the plot.

In 19th-century Azerbaijani literature, Mirza Fatali Akhundov utilized fictional personas to deliver profound philosophical critiques of Eastern societies. In his 1865 philosophical treatise "The Letters of Kamal-ud-Dawla", the narrative is structured around a fictional correspondence between two Eastern princes: Kamal-ud-Dawla, an Indian prince traveling through Persia, and his friend Jalal-ud-Dawla. Through these fictional philosophers, Akhundov establishes an enlightened, rationalist dialogue that critiques religious dogmatism, despotism, and scholasticism, closely mirroring the traditions of Western Enlightenment thinkers like Voltaire and Montesquieu.

== See also ==
- The arts and politics
- Literary translation
- Translation criticism
- Science fiction as thought experiment

== Sources ==
- The Oxford Companion to Philosophy, Ted Honderich, ed., (Oxford University Press, 1995) ISBN 0-19-866132-0.
- Borges, Jorge Luis, Collected Fictions, 1998. Translated by Andrew Hurley. ISBN 0-14-028680-2.
- Magee, Bryan, The Philosophy of Schopenhauer (Oxford University Press, revised edition, 1977) ISBN 0-19-823722-7.
