= Sergio Troncoso =

American writer

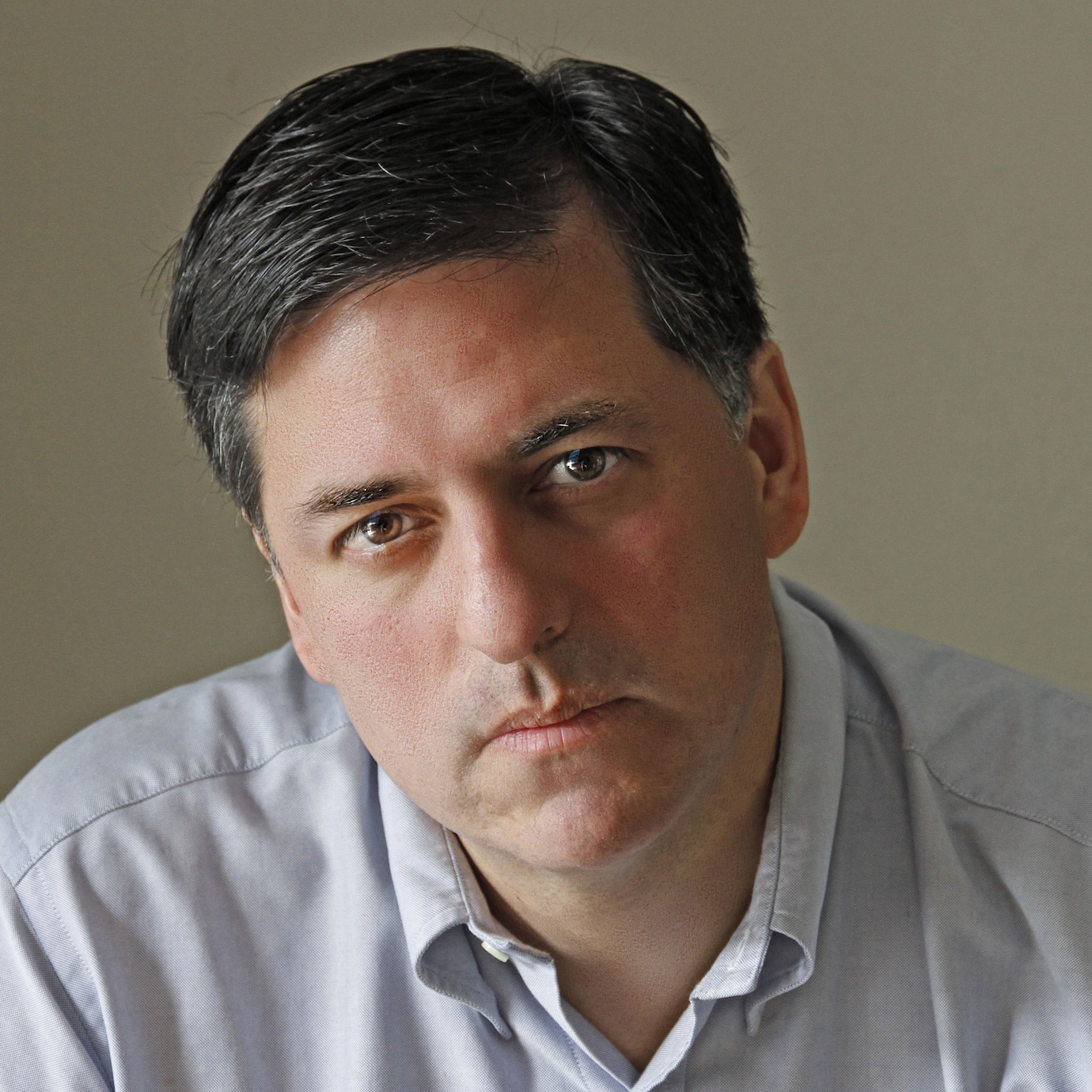
- Sergio Troncoso
- Born: 1961 (age 64–65); El Paso, Texas, U.S.
- Education: Harvard College (BA); Yale University (MA); Yale University (MPhil)
- Occupations: Novelist; short story writer; essayist; editor
- Writing career
- Language: English
- Period: 1990s-present
- Genres: Novels, short stories, essays, nonfiction
- Subjects: literary fiction, philosophy and literature, Mexican-American literature
- Notable works: Nobody's Pilgrims, The Last Tortilla and Other Stories, A Peculiar Kind of Immigrant's Son, From This Wicked Patch of Dust, Crossing Borders: Personal Essays, The Nature of Truth
- Notable awards: Inducted Member of the Texas Literary Hall of Fame; Premio Aztlán Literary Prize; Kay Cattarulla Award for Best Short Story; Fulbright Scholarship; Fellow of the Texas Institute of Letters; Literary Legacy Award; Hispanic Scholarship Fund's Alumni Hall of Fame; Inducted Member of the Texas Institute of Letters; In the Margins Book Awards- Top Ten List; Bronze Award for Anthologies from Independent Publisher Book Awards; Southwest Book Award; Gold Medal for Best Novel-Adventure or Drama from International Latino Book Awards; Gold Medal for Best Collection of Short Stories from International Latino Book Awards; Silver Award for Adult Multicultural Fiction from ForeWord Reviews; Bronze Award for Essays from ForeWord Reviews
- Website: www.sergiotroncoso.com

Sergio Troncoso (born 1961) is an American author of short stories, essays and novels. He often writes about the United States-Mexico border, working-class immigrants, families and fatherhood, philosophy in literature, and crossing cultural, psychological, and philosophical borders.

== Biography and literary work ==
Troncoso, the son of Mexican immigrants, was born in El Paso, Texas. He grew up on the east side of El Paso in rural Ysleta. His parents built their adobe house, and the family lived with kerosene lamps and stoves and an outhouse in the backyard during their first years in Texas. Troncoso attended South Loop School and Ysleta High School, where he was editor of the high school newspaper and won a Gannett Foundation scholarship to attend the Blair Summer School for Journalism in New Jersey. His grandfather was Santiago Troncoso, who was jailed 28 times by the Mexican government for publishing anti-corruption articles as editor and publisher of El Día in the 1920s, the first daily newspaper in Ciudad Juárez, Mexico.

Sergio Troncoso was accepted to Harvard College and struggled to adapt to this new world. "When I was at Harvard, I was scared and intimidated and I wasn't sure I belonged," he said in an interview for his 25th-year reunion. Troncoso studied Mexican history and politics to learn about his heritage and graduated magna cum laude in government, with a Latin American Certificate. He won a Fulbright Scholarship to Mexico, where he studied economics, politics, and literature. Later he received two graduate degrees in international relations and philosophy from Yale University, where his interests evolved to questions of the self, philosophy and psychology, and philosophy in literature.

In 1999, his book of short stories, The Last Tortilla and Other Stories (University of Arizona Press), won the Premio Aztlán Literary Prize for the best book by a new Chicano writer, and the Southwest Book Award from the Border Regional Library Association. In his story "Angie Luna," the tale of a feverish love affair in which a young man from El Paso rediscovers his Mexican heritage, Troncoso explores questions of self-identity and the ephemeral quality of love. "A Rock Trying to Be a Stone" is a story of three boys playing a dangerous game that becomes a test of character on the Mexico-U.S. border. "My Life in the City" focuses on a transplanted Texan's yearning for companionship in New York City. "Remembering Possibilities" delves into the terror of a young man attacked in his apartment while he takes solace in memories of a lost love. Troncoso typically sets aside the polemics about social discomfort sometimes found in contemporary Chicano literature and concentrates instead on the moral and intellectual lives of his characters.

His novel The Nature of Truth (Northwestern University Press) was first published in 2003, and is a story about a Yale research student who discovers that his boss, a renowned professor, hides a Nazi past. A reviewer from Janus Head, a journal of Philosophy, Literature, and Psychology, wrote: "The subtlety, and fairness, with which Troncoso presents these conflicting frameworks [Nietzschean valor, Christian pragmatism, and blind inductivism] stand as the novel's crowning intellectual achievement, side by side with the artistic one: a convincing tale of murder and ruminating guilt." In 2003, Troncoso was also inducted into the Hispanic Scholarship Fund's Alumni Hall of Fame.

In 2011, Troncoso published two books. His second novel, From This Wicked Patch of Dust (University of Arizona Press), is a story about the Martinez family, who begins life in a shantytown on the U.S.-Mexico border, and struggles to stay together despite cultural clashes, different religions, and contemporary politics. A reviewer from The Dallas Morning News wrote: "In a media market where cultural stereotypes abound, it's refreshing to read a novel featuring Latino characters who are nuanced and authentic. Sergio Troncoso's latest, From This Wicked Patch of Dust, follows a family from humble beginnings in a Texas border town through several decades as its members move beyond their Mexican Catholic culture to inhabit Jewish, Muslim and Ivy League spaces....These middle spaces have long been fodder for writers, though the El Paso-born and Harvard-educated Troncoso has created new, empathetic characters to explore it. No, the real beauty of this book is that it mines the rich diversity of tradition and culture among Latinos, as well as the commonalities they share with other Americans- love of family, faith and country." The novel was named as one of the best books of the year by Kirkus Reviews and won the Southwest Book Award from the Border Regional Library Association. The novel was chosen as a Notable Book by Southwest Books of the Year. Troncoso's novel was also a finalist for Reading The West Book Award from the Mountains and Plains Independent Booksellers Association, and was shortlisted runner-up for the biannual PEN/Texas Southwest Book Award for Fiction.

Crossing Borders: Personal Essays (Arte Público Press) was also published in 2011, and is a collection of sixteen essays about how Troncoso made the leap from growing up poor along the border to the Ivy League, his wife's battle against breast cancer, his struggles as a writer in New York and Texas, fatherhood, interfaith marriage, and Troncoso's appreciation of Judaism. A reviewer for The El Paso Times wrote: "These very personal essays cross several borders: cultural, historical, and self-imposed....We owe it to ourselves to read, savor and read them again." The collection of essays won the Bronze Award for Essays from ForeWord Reviews, and the silver medal for Best Biography in English from the International Latino Book Awards.

Troncoso was inducted into the Texas Institute of Letters in 2012.

In 2013, he co-edited Our Lost Border: Essays on Life amid the Narco-Violence (Arte Público Press), a collection of essays on how the unique bi-national and bi-cultural existence along the United States-Mexico border has been disrupted by recent drug violence. Publishers Weekly called it an "eye-opening collection of essays," and the San Antonio Express-News said it was "exceptionally beautiful and poignant writing." The collection won the Southwest Book Award from the Border Regional Library Association and the gold medal for Best Latino-focused Nonfiction Book (Bilingual) from the International Latino Book Awards. In 2013, Troncoso also received the Literary Legacy Award from the El Paso Community College.

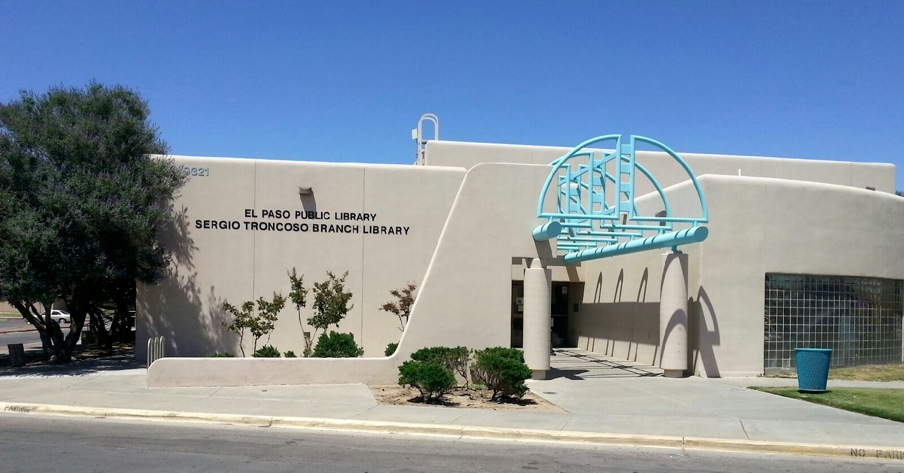
Sergio Troncoso Branch Library, 9321 Alameda Avenue, El Paso, Texas.

On July 29, 2014, the El Paso City Council voted unanimously to rename the Ysleta public library branch in honor of Sergio Troncoso. At the re-dedication ceremony on October 2, 2015, the author announced the creation of the annual Troncoso Reading Prizes to encourage the love of reading and writing in grade school, middle school, and high school students in the Ysleta area.

Troncoso was a judge for the Shrake Award for Best Short Nonfiction from the Texas Institute of Letters in 2014. For three years, he also served on the Literature panel of the New York State Council on the Arts, and in 2014 he was co-chair of that panel.

Arte Público Press also published a revised and updated paperback edition of Troncoso's novel The Nature of Truth in 2014. The revised edition of The Nature of Truth won the Bronze Award for Adult Multicultural Fiction from ForeWord Reviews in 2015, and was also chosen as one of the Top Ten Best Fiction Books for 2014 by TheLatinoAuthor.com. In a review of the revised novel from Prime Number Magazine, Brandon D. Shuler wrote: "Without the intellectual questioning of truth in The Nature of Truth, his mature works, I believe, would not have been possible. Troncoso, primarily known for his US-Mexican Border works, is, as The Nature of Truth suggests, the brightest and most able of the modern Border writers and thinkers."

Troncoso served as one of three national judges for the 2016 PEN/Faulkner Award for Fiction.

In 2017, he was a national writing juror in the Critical Essay category for the Scholastic Writing Awards and final judge in the Essay category in the New Letters Literary Awards. That year the author was elected to a second two-year term on the board of councilors of the Texas Institute of Letters and in May he was appointed secretary, an officer of the TIL. In October 2017, Troncoso permanently endowed the Sergio Troncoso Award for Best First Book of Fiction from the Texas Institute of Letters to encourage the next generation of writers from his home state.

On April 7, 2018, Troncoso was elected vice president of the Texas Institute of Letters. He was again a national writing juror for Scholastic Writing Awards, this time in the Personal Essay category in 2018.

In 2019, Troncoso published a collection of linked short stories on immigration, A Peculiar Kind of Immigrant's Son (Cinco Puntos Press), which Junot Díaz praised as a "masterwork" and Luis Alberto Urrea called "a world-class collection." A reviewer for The Texas Observer wrote: "The El Paso author’s newest collection depicts contemporary Mexican American life with a characteristic blend of sorrow and humor. It’s his most powerful work yet, and an essential addition to the Latinx canon." Lone Star Literary Life chose the book for the "Best of Texas 2019". "Rosary on the Border," the first story in A Peculiar Kind of Immigrant's Son, won the 2020 Kay Cattarulla Award for Best Short Story from the Texas Institute of Letters. A Peculiar Kind of Immigrant's Son won the gold medal for Best Collection of Short Stories from the International Latino Book Awards and the Silver Award for Adult Multicultural Fiction from ForeWord Reviews. In 2023, Luis Alberto Urrea wrote in The New York Times, "A Peculiar Kind of Immigrant's Son is simply brilliant."

On March 28, 2020, Troncoso was elected president of the Texas Institute of Letters. His two-year term as president was noted for achieving a record number of submissions for the twelve annual literary contests of the Texas Institute of Letters, increased engagement with members that resulted in a record number paying their membership dues, two years of significant financial surpluses, and the selection of lifetime achievement awards for Benjamin Alire Sáenz and Celeste Bedford Walker, the first African-American to win that award. In a profile by Texas Monthly, Sergio Troncoso said: “I threw my heart and soul into the TIL. That meant representing all of Texas.... The organization truly is morphing into something beyond white guys from Dallas and Austin.” Troncoso's term as TIL president ended at the annual banquet in El Paso, Texas on April 23, 2022.

In 2021, Troncoso edited an anthology of mostly unpublished essays, poetry, and short stories, Nepantla Familias: An Anthology of Mexican American Literature on Families in between Worlds (Texas A&M University Press and Wittliff Collections), which Kirkus Reviews praised in a starred review: "A deeply meaningful collection that navigates important nuances of identity." Nepantla Familias won the bronze medal for Anthologies from the Independent Publisher Book Awards and the silver medal for Best Culturally Themed Academic Book from the International Latino Book Awards.

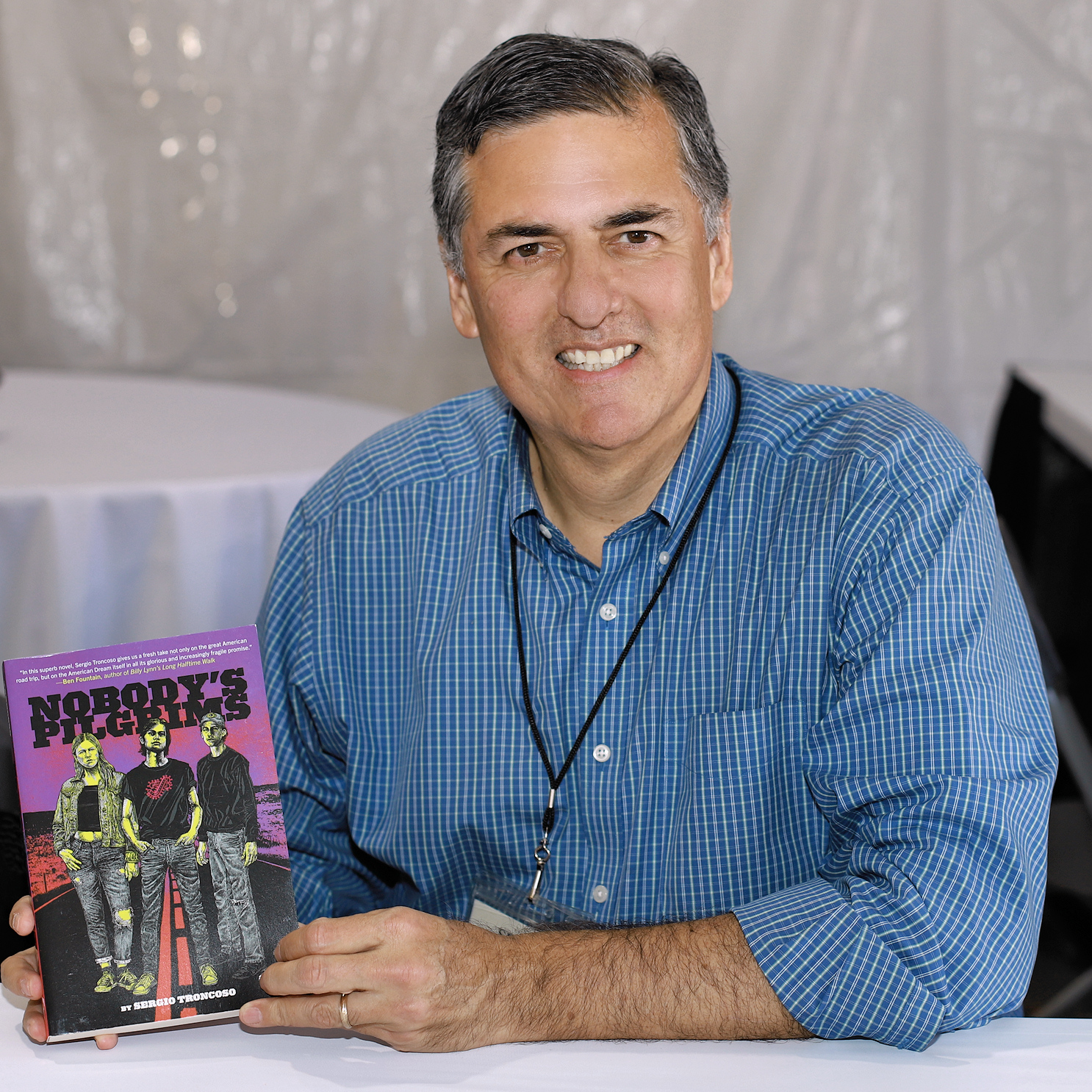
Troncoso at the 2022 Texas Book Festival.

In 2022, he published his eighth book and third novel, Nobody's Pilgrims (Lee & Low Books: Cinco Puntos Press). Ben Fountain praised it: "In this superb novel, Sergio Troncoso gives us a fresh take not only on the great American road trip, but on the American Dream itself in all its glorious and increasingly fragile promise." Kirkus Reviews wrote in a review: "Troncoso delivers a surprisingly fast-paced, character-driven story.... A sublime, diverse cast drives this tale of looking for a safe, welcoming home.” Nobody's Pilgrims won the gold medal for Best Novel- Adventure or Drama (English) from the International Latino Book Awards. Librarians also selected Nobody's Pilgrims for the Top Ten List in Fiction, Nonfiction, and Social Advocacy of the In the Margins Book Awards.

On January 7, 2023, the council and past presidents of the Texas Institute of Letters voted unanimously to name Sergio Troncoso a Fellow of the institute. In its 86-year-old history, the TIL has appointed only seventeen previous Fellows, an honorary designation meant to distinguish TIL members for their service and contributions to the organization. Previous Fellows of the institute have included J. Frank Dobie, Thomas C. Lea III, John Graves, A.C. Greene, Robert Flynn, William D. Wittliff, and Carolyn C. Osborn. Troncoso is the first Mexican American writer to receive this distinction.

In 2024, Troncoso was inducted into the Texas Literary Hall of Fame, along with Tracy Daugherty, Molly Ivins, Stephen Graham Jones, Cormac McCarthy, Jan Seale, and Cynthia Leitich Smith.

In 2025, he was one of five judges for the Jesse H. Jones Fellowship for writers from the Texas Institute of Letters.

For many years, the author has taught fiction and nonfiction workshops at the Yale Writers' Workshop in New Haven, Connecticut. His literary papers are archived at the Wittliff Collections in San Marcos, Texas.

His stories have been featured in many anthologies, including We Wear the Mask: Fifteen True Stories of Passing in America (Beacon Press), Critical Thinking, Thoughtful Writing (Cengage Learning), Camino Del Sol: Fifteen Years of Latina and Latino Writing (University of Arizona Press), Latino Boom: An Anthology of U.S. Latino Literature (Pearson/Longman Publishing), Hecho en Tejas: An Anthology of Texas-Mexican Literature (University of New Mexico Press), City Wilds: Essays and Stories about Urban Nature (University of Georgia Press), and New World: Young Latino Writers (Dell Publishing). His work has also appeared in Pleiades, Texas Highways, New Letters, Yale Review, Michigan Quarterly Review, New Guard Literary Review, Houston Chronicle, Texas Monthly, Dallas Morning News, Review: Literature and Arts of the Americas, Newsday, Hadassah Magazine, Other Voices, and many other newspapers and magazines.

== Bibliography ==
=== Books ===
- Nobody's Pilgrims (Lee & Low Books: Cinco Puntos Press, 2022)
- A Peculiar Kind of Immigrant's Son (Cinco Puntos Press, 2019)
- From This Wicked Patch of Dust (University of Arizona Press, 2011)
- Crossing Borders: Personal Essays (Arte Público Press, 2011)
- The Nature of Truth (Northwestern University Press, 2003); (Arte Público Press, 2014)
- The Last Tortilla and Other Stories (University of Arizona Press, 1999)

=== Anthology (editor) ===
- Nepantla Familias: An Anthology of Mexican American Literature on Families in between Worlds, (Texas A&M University Press and Wittliff Collections, 2021)
- Our Lost Border: Essays on Life amid the Narco-Violence, (Arte Público Press, 2013)

== Awards ==
- 1983 - Fulbright Scholar
- 1999 - Premio Aztlán Literary Prize for The Last Tortilla and Other Stories
- 2000 - Southwest Book Award from Border Regional Library Association for The Last Tortilla and Other Stories
- 2003 - Inducted into Hispanic Scholarship Fund's Alumni Hall of Fame
- 2011 - Notable Book in Southwest Books of the Year from Pima County Public Library for From This Wicked Patch of Dust
- 2011 - Honorable Mention for Multicultural Fiction from Foreword INDIES Book of the Year Awards for From This Wicked Patch of Dust
- 2011 - Bronze Award for Essays from Foreword INDIES Book of the Year Awards for Crossing Borders: Personal Essays
- 2012 - Honorable Mention for Tejas Fiction Award from National Association of Chicana and Chicano Studies for From This Wicked Patch of Dust
- 2012 - Inducted as Member of the Texas Institute of Letters
- 2012 - Silver Medal for Best Biography in English from International Latino Book Awards for Crossing Borders: Personal Essays
- 2012 - Honorable Mention for Best Novel in English (Adventure/Drama) from International Latino Book Awards for From This Wicked Patch of Dust
- 2012 - Finalist for Reading the West Award in Adult Fiction from Mountains and Plains Independent Booksellers Association for From This Wicked Patch of Dust
- 2012 - Best Books of 2012 from Kirkus Reviews for From This Wicked Patch of Dust
- 2012 - Finalist for Red Hen Press Short Story Award for "Turnaround in the Dark"
- 2012 - Southwest Book Award from Border Regional Library Association for From This Wicked Patch of Dust
- 2013 - Literary Legacy Award from El Paso Community College
- 2013 - Short-listed runner-up for PEN/Texas Southwest Book Award for Fiction for From This Wicked Patch of Dust
- 2013 - Southwest Book Award from Border Regional Library Association for Our Lost Border: Essays on Life amid the Narco-Violence
- 2014 - Gold Medal for Best Latino-focused Nonfiction Book (Bilingual) from International Latino Book Awards for Our Lost Border: Essays on Life amid the Narco-Violence
- 2014 - Ysleta branch public library renamed Sergio Troncoso Branch Library by El Paso, Texas City Council
- 2014 - Bronze Award for Multicultural Fiction from Foreword INDIES Book of the Year Awards for The Nature of Truth
- 2015 - Finalist in Genre Fiction from Housatonic Book Awards for The Nature of Truth
- 2016 - Long-listed in Disquiet Prize (Fiction) from Guernica Magazine for "Mexican Rosary"
- 2017 - Finalist in Machigonne Fiction Contest from The New Guard Volume VII for "Fragments of a Dream"
- 2018 - Finalist for Edwin Shrake Award for Best Short Nonfiction from Texas Institute of Letters for "Passing Ambition"
- 2019 - Silver Award in Multicultural Fiction from Foreword INDIES Book of the Year Awards for A Peculiar Kind of Immigrant's Son
- 2020 - Kay Cattarulla Award for Best Short Story from Texas Institute of Letters for "Rosary on the Border"
- 2020 - Gold Medal for Best Collection of Short Stories (English or Bilingual) from International Latino Book Awards for A Peculiar Kind of Immigrant's Son
- 2021 - Silver Medal for Best Culturally Themed Academic Book from International Latino Book Awards for Nepantla Familias: An Anthology of Mexican American Literature on Families in Between Worlds
- 2021 - Silver Medal for The Rudolfo Anaya Best Latino Focused Fiction Book Award (English) from International Latino Book Awards for A Peculiar Kind of Immigrant's Son
- 2022 - Finalist for Edwin Shrake Award for Best Short Nonfiction from Texas Institute of Letters for "Dust to Dust: A Mother's Hope Binds Her Family in the Border Town of Ysleta"
- 2022 - Bronze Medal for The Rudolfo Anaya Best Latino Focused Fiction Book Award (English) from International Latino Book Awards for Nobody's Pilgrims
- 2022 - Gold Medal for Best Novel-Adventure or Drama (English) from International Latino Book Awards for Nobody's Pilgrims
- 2022 - Finalist for Multicultural Fiction from Foreword INDIES Book of the Year Awards for Nobody's Pilgrims
- 2022 - Best Texas Books of 2022, Nobody's Pilgrims, The Texas Observer
- 2023 - Named Fellow of the Texas Institute of Letters
- 2023 - Finalist for Montaigne Medal from Eric Hoffer Book Awards for Nepantla Familias: An Anthology of Mexican American Literature on Families in Between Worlds
- 2023 - Bronze Award for Anthologies from Independent Publisher Book Awards for Nepantla Familias: An Anthology of Mexican American Literature on Families in Between Worlds
- 2023 - Top Ten List for Fiction, Nonfiction, and Social Advocacy from In the Margins Book Awards for Nobody's Pilgrims
- 2023 - Honorable Mention in Fiction Award from Philosophical Society of Texas for Nobody's Pilgrims
- 2024 - Inducted as Member of the Texas Literary Hall of Fame
