= Charles Bowden =

American writer (1945–2014)

- Born: Charles Clyde Bowden; July 20, 1945; Joliet, Illinois, U.S.
- Died: August 30, 2014 (aged 69); Las Cruces, New Mexico, U.S.
- Occupations: Writer, journalist
- Awards: Lannan Literary Award for Nonfiction

Charles Clyde Bowden (July 20, 1945 – August 30, 2014) was an American non-fiction author, journalist and essayist based in Las Cruces, New Mexico. He was best known for his work documenting violence on the Mexico-United States border, especially in and around Ciudad Juarez.

== Early life and education ==
Bowden was born on July 20, 1945, in Joliet, Illinois, and grew up first in Chicago and later in Tucson, Arizona. He attended Tucson High School, the University of Arizona, and the University of Wisconsin, where he obtained his master's degree in American intellectual history; while there he walked out as he was defending his dissertation for his doctorate, annoyed by the questions asked him by the review committee.

== Career ==
Bowden was a writer for the Tucson Citizen and often wrote about the American Southwest. He was a contributing editor of GQ and Mother Jones magazine, and he wrote for other periodicals, including Harper's Magazine, The New York Times Book Review, Esquire, High Country News, and Aperture.

Bowden was the winner of the 1996 Lannan Literary Award for Nonfiction, the PEN Center USA’s First Amendment Award in 2011, and a 2010 award from United States Artists. He was known for his writings on the situation at the US–Mexico border and wrote often about the effects of the war on drugs on the lives of the people in that region. Earlier in his career his writings focused more on environmental issues, the beauty of nature, and sustainability challenges.

== Personal life and death ==
Bowden was married and divorced twice, and had long-term relationships and professional partnerships with writer Mary Martha Miles and research librarian Molly Molloy. He died in Las Cruces, New Mexico, on August 30, 2014, after a brief illness. He was survived by his son and two siblings. He left a number of manuscripts that are being published posthumously by The Bowden Publishing Project, which is also reissuing some of his earlier books. His work and life were the subject of the Spring 2019 special issue of Journal of the Southwest, and a related book, America's Most Alarming Writer: Essays on the Life and Work of Charles Bowden.

== Selected works ==
- The Impact of Energy Development on Water Resources in Arid Lands: Literature Review and Annotated Bibliography (Tucson: University of Arizona, Office of Arid Lands Studies, 1975)
- Killing the Hidden Waters (Austin: University of Texas Press, 1977)
- Street Signs Chicago: Neighborhood and Other Illusions of Big City Life / text by Charles Bowden and Lew Kreinberg; photographs by Richard Younker; foreword by William Appleman Williams (Chicago: Chicago Review Press, 1981)
- Blue Desert (Tucson: University of Arizona Press, 1986)
- Frog Mountain Blues / text by Charles Bowden; photographs by Jack W. Dykinga (Tucson: University of Arizona Press, 1987)
- Trust Me: Charles Keating and the Missing Billions / text by Charles Bowden and Michael Binstein (New York: Random House,1988)
- Mezcal (Tucson, Arizona: University of Arizona Press, 1988)
- Red Line (New York: Norton, 1989)
- Desierto: Memories of the Future (New York: Norton, 1991)
- The Sonoran Desert / photographs by Jack W. Dykinga; text by Charles Bowden (New York: H. N. Abrams, 1992)
- The Secret Forest / text by Charles Bowden; photographs by Jack W. Dykinga; introduction by Paul S. Martin (Albuquerque: University of New Mexico Press, 1993)
- Seasons of the Coyote: the Legend and Lore of an American Icon / essays by Charles Bowden, et al. (San Francisco: HarperCollins West, 1994)
- Frog Mountain Blues; photographs by Jack W. Dykinga; with a new afterword by the author (Tucson: University of Arizona Press, 1994)
- Blood Orchid: An Unnatural History of America (New York: Random House, 1995)
- Chihuahua: Pictures From the Edge / photographs by Virgil Hancock; essay by Charles Bowden (Albuquerque: University of New Mexico Press, 1996)
- Stone Canyons of the Colorado Plateau / photographs by Jack W. Dykinga; text by Charles Bowden (New York: Abrams, 1996)
- The Sierra Pinacate / Julian D. Hayden; photographs by Jack Dykinga; essays by Charles Bowden and Bernard L. Fontana (Tucson: University of Arizona Press, 1998)
- Juárez: The Laboratory of our Future / text by Charles Bowden; preface by Noam Chomsky; afterword by Eduardo Galeano (New York: Aperture, 1998)
- Torch Song (article – 1998)
- Paul Dickerson, 1961–1997 / essay by Charles Bowden (New York: American Fine Art Co., 2000)
- Eugene Richards (New York: Phaidon, 2001)
- Down by the River: Drugs, Money, Murder, and Family (New York: Simon & Schuster, Inc., 2002)
- Blues for Cannibals: The Notes from Underground (New York: North Point Press, 2002)
- Killing the Hidden Waters / with a new introduction by the author (Austin: University of Texas Press, 2003)
- A Shadow in the City : Confessions of an Undercover Drug Warrior (New York: Harcourt, 2005)
- Sometimes a Great Notion / text by Ken Kesey; introduction by Charles Bowden, pp. xiii–xix (Penguin Books, 2006)
- Kill the Messenger: How the CIA's Crack-Cocaine Controversy Destroyed Journalist Gary Webb / text by Nick Schou; preface by Charles Bowden (New York: Nation Books, 2006)
- Inferno / text by Charles Bowden; photographs by Michael P. Berman (Austin: University of Texas Press, 2006) Winner of the Border Regional Library Association's Southwest Book Award
- Exodus/Éxodo / text by Charles Bowden, photographs by Julián Cardona (Austin: University of Texas Press, 2008)
- Trinity (Austin: University of Texas Press, 2009; with photographs by Michael P. Berman)
- Some of the Dead are Still Breathing: Living in the Future (Boston: Houghton, Mifflin, Harcourt, 2009)
- The Charles Bowden Reader (Austin: University of Texas Press, 2010; edited by Erin Almeranti and Mary Martha Miles; foreword by Jim Harrison)
- Dreamland: The Way Out of Juárez / text by Charles Bowden; illustrations by Alice Leora Briggs (Austin: University of Texas Press, 2010)
- Murder City: Ciudad Juárez and the Global Economy's New Killing Fields / text by Charles Bowden; photographs by Julián Cardona (New York: Nation City, 2011)
- El Sicario: The Autobiography of a Mexican Assassin / co-editors Molly Molloy and Charles Bowden (North Sidney, NSW: Random House Australia, 2011)
- Dead When I Got Here: Asylum from the Madness (2014); Executive Producer of documentary in collaboration with Director/Producer Mark Aitken – deadwhenigothere.org
- Some of the Dead Are Still Breathing: Living in the Future (Austin: University of Texas Press, 2018)
- Dakotah: The Return of the Future (Austin: University of Texas Press, 2019; foreword by Terry Tempest Williams)
- Jericho (Austin: University of Texas Press, 2020; foreword by Charles D'Ambrosio)
- The Red Caddy: Into the Unknown with Edward Abbey (Austin: University of Texas Press, September 2020; foreword by Luis Alberto Urrea)
- Sonata (Austin: University of Texas Press, October 2020; foreword by Alfredo Corchado)

== Archival sources ==
- The Charles Bowden Papers 1947–2007 (50 linear feet) are housed at the Wittliff Collections, Texas State University in San Marcos.
