= Crossing Borders =

Crossing Borders may refer to:

- Crossing Borders: Personal Essays, by Sergio Troncoso, 2011
- Crossing Borders (film), by Carlos Iglesias, 2006
