= Julián Cardona (photojournalist) =

Mexican photojournalist (1960–2020)

- Born: 18 August 1960; Zacatecas, Mexico
- Died: September 21, 2020 (aged 60); Ciudad Juárez, Chihuahua, Mexico
- Education: Self‑taught photographer; vocational training
- Occupation: Photojournalist · Educator
- Years active: 1993–2020
- Employer(s): El Fronterizo; El Diario de Juárez; Reuters
- Known for: Documenting poverty, economic violence, and femicide in Ciudad Juárez
- Notable work: Juárez: The Laboratory of Our Future (1998); Exodus/Éxodo (2008); Murder City (2010)
- Awards: Cultural Freedom Fellowship (Lannan Foundation, 2004)

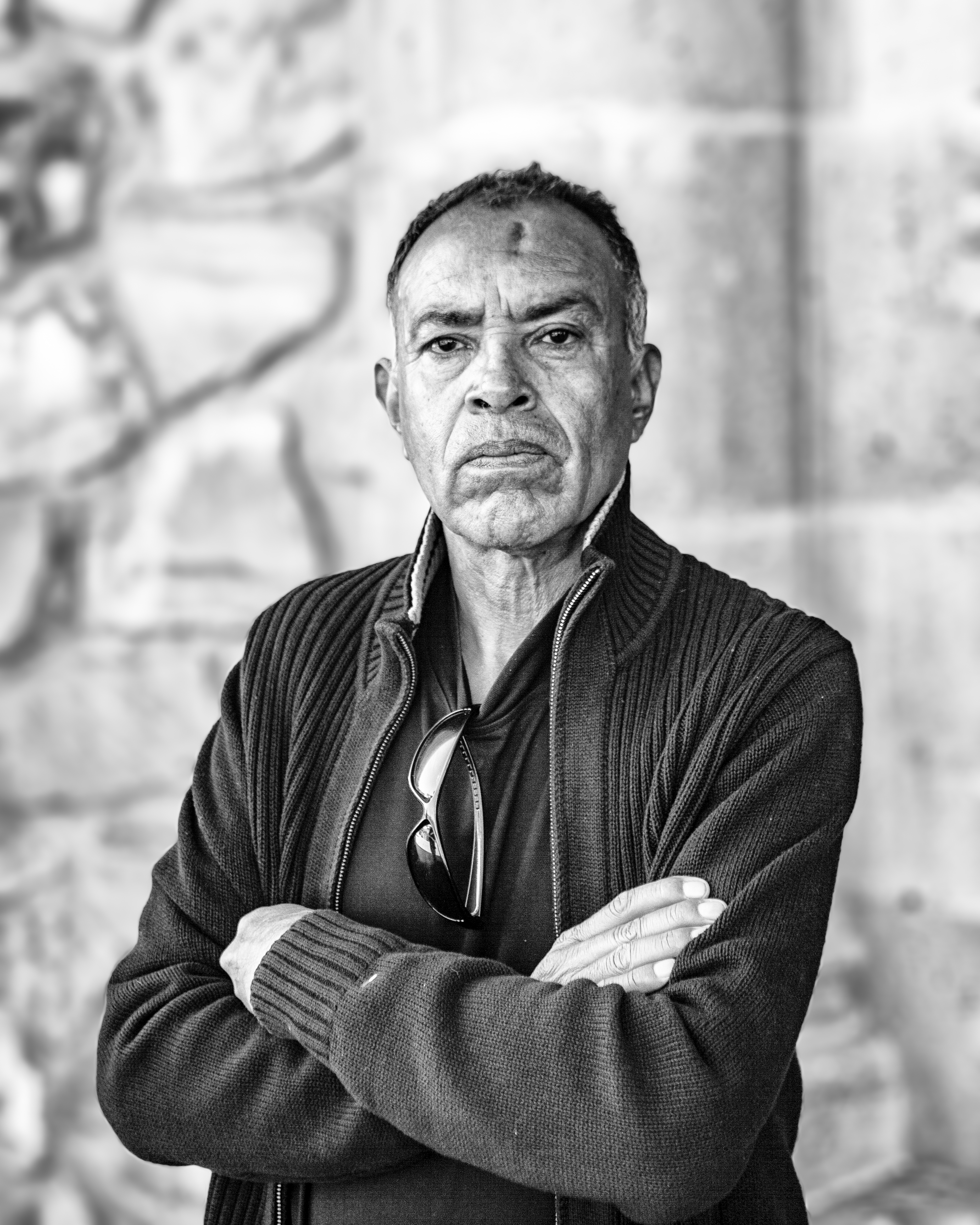
Julián Cardona, January 17, 2020

Julián Cardona (18 August 1960 – 21 September 2020) was a Mexican photojournalist who was known for documenting poverty and violence in the city of Ciudad Juárez.

== Early life ==
Julián Cardona was born in Zacatecas, Mexico, on August 18, 1960. His family moved to Ciudad Juárez when he was a young child. Raised by his grandparents, and with only a ninth grade education, he taught himself to use a camera professionally by age twenty. He worked in the maquiladora industry until 1991, when he moved back to Zacatecas to teach photography.

== Career ==
Although he had earlier done some photography for tabloids, in 1993 Cardona began to work professionally as a photojournalist at the Ciudad Juárez newspapers El Fronterizo and El Diario de Juárez. He co-authored many newspaper and magazine articles along with several books, including Juarez: The Laboratory of Our Future and Exodus/Exodo, both with journalist Charles Bowden. His photographs have also been profiled in several major exhibitions, including Nothing to See (1995), Borders and Beyond (2001), Lines of Sight: Views of the U.S./Mexican Border (2002), Photography Past/Forward: Aperture at 50 (2003), the History of the Future (2009), and Stardust: Memories of the Calle Mariscal (2013). Cardona worked for several years as a Reuters correspondent in Mexico beginning in 2009, and he also was a photography editor in Mexico City. During the final years of his life he worked as a freelance journalist and photographer.

== Impact ==
Cardona was considered to be one of the most important photographers documenting the economic challenges and criminal drug-related violence in Mexico along the U.S. border, especially in Ciudad Juárez. His photographs were sometimes criticized for their graphic portrayal of violence, including torture, rape, and murder victims. Other critics observed that Cardona linked the extreme violence and femicide in border cities like Juarez with globalization and especially the influx of Maquiladoras (factories), something that Cardona himself acknowledged and emphasized in interviews. Interviewed on the PBS NewsHour in 2012, Cardona said that "It's an important story, how a city becomes the most violent city on earth. I was able to do it, and I'm OK with that. It's my job."

== Publications ==
- Juarez: The Laboratory of Our Future, 1998, Aperture Press (with Charles Bowden)
- Morir Despacio: Una Mirada al Interior de las Maquiladoras en la Frontera E.U./México, 2000
- No One is Illegal: Fighting Violence and State Repression on the U.S.-Mexico Border, 2006, Haymarket Books (with Justin Akers Chacon and Mike Davis)
- Exodus/Exodo, 2008, University of Texas Press (with Charles Bowden)
- "Market Driven Merciless Violence," Justice Rising, Spring 2008, pp. 8-9
- Murder City: Ciudad Juárez and the Global Economy's New Killing Fields, 2011, Nation Books, (with Charles Bowden)
- Stardust: Memories of the Calle Mariscal, 2014, University of Texas at El Paso, Rubin Center for the Visual Arts
- Abecedario de Juárez: an illustrated lexicon, 2021, University of Texas Press (with Alice Leora Briggs)

== Death ==
Cardona died of natural causes on September 21, 2020, in Ciudad Juárez.

== Legacy ==
Cardona received the Cultural Freedom Prize from the Lannan Foundation in 2004.

Cardona’s photographic archives are preserved by the Tom and Ethel Bradley Center in the University Library, Special Collections and Archives, California State University, Northridge.
