= Pablo's Tree =

1994 picture book by Pat Mora

- Author: Pat Mora
- Illustrator: Cecily Lang
- Genre: Picture book
- Publisher: Simon & Schuster Children's Publishing
- Publication date: 1994
- Pages: 32
- ISBN: 0-02-767401-0
- OCLC: 26764493
- Dewey Decimal: [E] 20
- LC Class: PZ7.M78819 Pab 1994

Pablo's Tree is a children's story about an adopted Latino boy who spends the day after every birthday with his grandfather, who decorates a special tree, that he planted for Pablo, every year on his birthday. Pablo is excited when he visits his grandfather on the day after his fifth birthday. The book was written by Pat Mora and illustrated by Cecily Lang.
