= From This Wicked Patch of Dust =

2011 novel by Sergio Troncoso

- Author: Sergio Troncoso
- Language: English
- Genre: Literary novel
- Publisher: The University of Arizona Press
- Publication date: Sep 2011
- Publication place: United States
- Media type: Print (Paperback)
- Pages: 240 pp
- ISBN: 0-8165-3004-1
- LC Class: PS3570.R5876 F76X 2011

From This Wicked Patch of Dust is a novel by Sergio Troncoso first published in 2011 by The University of Arizona Press. It explores the struggle of a Mexican-American family to become American and yet not be pulled apart by a maelstrom of cultural forces.

== Plot summary ==
In the border shantytown of Ysleta, Texas, Mexican immigrants Pilar and Cuauhtemoc Martinez strive to teach their four children to forsake the drugs and gangs of their neighborhood. The family's hardscrabble origins unite them to survive, but soon the children adapt to their new home, reject their traditional religion and culture, and struggle to remain together as a family. The novel spans four decades.

As a young adult, daughter Julieta travels to Central America, becomes disenchanted with Catholicism, and converts to Islam. Youngest son Ismael, always the bookworm, is accepted to Harvard but feels out of place in the Northeast, where he meets and marries a Jewish woman. The other boys—Marcos and Francisco—toil in their father's old apartment buildings, serving as cheap labor to fuel the family's rise to the middle class. Over time, Francisco isolates himself in El Paso. Marcos eventually leaves to become a teacher, but then returns, struggling with a deep bitterness about his work and marriage. Through it all, Pilar clings to the idea of her family and tries to hold it together as her husband's health begins to fail.

This backdrop is shaken to its core by the historic events of 2001 in New York City, which send shockwaves through this newly American family. Bitter conflicts erupt between siblings, and the physical and cultural spaces between them threaten to tear them apart. Will their shared history and once-shared dreams be enough to hold together a family from Ysleta, this wicked patch of dust?

== Characters in "From This Wicked Patch of Dust" ==
- Pilar Martinez – The mother who struggles to give opportunities to her children as they grow up on the Mexico–US border, yet who also sees her children stray further from their religion, culture, and family.
- Cuauhtemoc Martinez – The father who loves Mexico and criticizes the culture in the United States, even as he follows Pilar to El Paso, Texas to make a new life for both of them.
- Julia Martinez – The oldest of the Martinez children who is a rebellious teenager, then becomes politically active in college, and finally transforms herself dramatically as an adult and adopts a new religion.
- Francisco (Pancho) Martinez – A perennially shy boy, the dutiful eldest son who stays in El Paso, helps his parents as they get older, and eventually blossoms in the desert as an older adult.
- Marcos Martinez – An athletic and ambitious son who leaves El Paso for college, returns but is never quite happy with his hometown, and becomes a teacher and a soldier.
- Ismael (Mayello) Martinez – The youngest of the Martinez children who uses his mind to break away from the poverty of the border, but struggles to find meaning in the alien world of the Northeastern United States.

== Main themes ==
Troncoso's novel explores the family as a group protagonist in an assimilation story, and how the family is created, questioned, undermined, and recreated as the children adopt new cultural practices, religions and politics, yet remain tenuously together because of their common origin and their effort to find new meaning in themselves. Scholar Diane Sabatier wrote: "Pilar and Cuauhtemoc's children adopt various strategies to come to terms with their cultural hybridity. Their multiplicity of itineraries shatters monolithic and caricatured views of Chicanos....From This Wicked Patch of Dust suggests that the handing down of a patrimony, literally and figuratively, is synonymous with mutations due to intercultural dialogues. Their children, who do not commemorate a frozen and dusty memory, subvert Cuauhtemoc and Pilar's vision of Mexico. From the siblings' point of view, being an heir implies summoning up the courage to face the ghosts of the Mexican ancestors who haunt their daily lives. More than denying them the right to do so, they assume that they do not cast a shadow over their individual destinies....Embarking on different journeys, they search for their own place in mobile identities."

== Literary significance & criticism ==
Miroslav Penkov, judge for biannual PEN/Texas Southwest Book Award for Fiction, wrote: "What is it to be American, Mexican, Catholic, Jewish or Muslim? What is it to struggle – for sustenance, for the freedom to choose who you want to be? Effortlessly, with elegance of style, Troncoso weaves a tapestry of lives, of human beings who by the end of the book feel not just real, not just intimately close, but undeniable, inescapable, a part of ourselves."

A reviewer from Kirkus Reviews wrote in a starred review: "Troncoso seamlessly intertwines the struggles the grown children face with their parents’ desire to help them become independent and proud Mexican-Americans. The prose is powerful in an unassuming way, making for a captivating read. The author carefully paces the book, with each chapter plotting an era in the family's lives, ultimately joining the family's collective narrative of religion and family obligation with the current events of the time. Troncoso is clearly adept at his craft, telling a story filled with rich language and the realities of family life closing with a son reassuring his mother, and literature reassuring them both.

With its skillful pairing of conflict over religious and familial obligations with the backdrop of a Mexican-American family's love for one another, Troncoso's novel is an engaging literary achievement."

A reviewer from The Dallas Morning News wrote: "In a media market where cultural stereotypes abound, it’s refreshing to read a novel featuring Latino characters who are nuanced and authentic. Sergio Troncoso’s latest, From This Wicked Patch of Dust, follows a family from humble beginnings in a Texas border town through several decades as its members move beyond their Mexican Catholic culture to inhabit Jewish, Muslim and Ivy League spaces....

From This Wicked Patch of Dust was named as one of the best books of 2012 by Kirkus Reviews, and won the Southwest Book Award from the Border Regional Library Association. The novel was chosen as a Notable Book by Southwest Books of the Year. From This Wicked Patch of Dust was also a finalist for Reading The West Book Award from the Mountains and Plains Independent Booksellers Association, and was shortlisted runner-up for the biannual PEN/Texas Southwest Book Award for Fiction.
