= The Rainbow Tulip =

Children's Book released in 1999 by Pat Mora

- Author: Pat Mora
- Illustrator: Elizabeth Sayles
- Language: English
- Genre: Children's picture book
- Publisher: Viking Children's Books
- Publication date: 1999
- Publication place: United States
- Media type: Print
- ISBN: 9780670872916
- OCLC: 173498097

The Rainbow Tulip is a 1999 historical fiction children's picture book by Pat Mora and illustrated by Elizabeth Sayles. Published by Viking Children's Books in 1999, it follows the story of a young girl named Estelita. Estelita is the only Hispanic student in the first-grade class and feels very different from the rest of her classmates. Her heritage is differs from many of the other children and she struggles with her looks and sounds differing from the other kids'. Estelita is bilingual and speaks English at school while her parents speak only Spanish. She loves her family but notices that even her mother stands out from the other mothers in her class. Estelita embraces her heritage but does not always love feeling so different from everyone else. With the help of a colorful costume and a joyous dance around a maypole, Estelita learns to embrace standing out from her classmates. Estelita's thoughts and feelings are at the forefront of this story as she finds comfort with who she is.

== Background ==
Pat Mora is a picture book author, poet, educator, and advocate. She is often recognized for her advocacy for bilingual literacy and often incorporates Spanish and English language into her books and poetry. Mora grew up in a bilingual household is passionate about representing both languages in her work. She hopes that the representation will encourage readers to feel proud of whatever combinations languages they speak and the heritage they come from. Mora wrote The Rainbow Tulip as a Mother's Day gift to her mother, Estela Mora. The story is based on the experiences of Mora's mother in the first grade as an immigrant child in El Paso, Texas.

== Reception ==
The Rainbow Tulip was reviewed in such outlets as Booklist, Kirkus Reviews, and The Horn Book Guide.
