= Lucrecia Guerrero =

American novelist and short story writer

Lucrecia Guerrero is an American novelist and short story writer whose works include Chasing Shadows (2000) and Tree of Sighs (2010). In 2024, Guerrero published the novel On the Mad River. The novel received a Gold Medal for Fiction/Drama at the 27th International Latino Book Awards in 2025 and first place in the 2024 American Fiction Awards (Suspense category).

Guerrero was born and raised bilingual and bicultural on the U.S.–Mexico border in Nogales, Arizona, and later lived in the Midwest, where her work has drawn on experiences of cultural intersection and identity. Her short stories have appeared in numerous literary journals and anthologies, and her published books include the linked short story collection Chasing Shadows (2000), the novel Tree of Sighs (2011), and the novel On the Mad River (2024). Tree of Sighs received the Christopher Isherwood Foundation Award and the Premio Aztlán Literary Prize. On the Mad River received a Gold Medal for Fiction/Drama at the 27th International Latino Book Awards and first place in the 2024 American Fiction Awards (Suspense category).

Guerrero currently resides near Chicago, where she writes and finds herself in frequent demand for teaching assignments at writers' conferences. She holds an MFA from Spaulding University in Louisville.

== Awards and honors ==
Year	Award	Work	Result	Ref.
2025	International Latino Book Award (ILBA) Gold Medal	On the Mad River	Winner	
2012	Premio Aztlán Literary Prize	Tree of Sighs	Winner	
