= Neil Miller (writer) =

American journalist and nonfiction writer

Neil Miller (born 1945) is an American journalist and nonfiction writer, best known for his books on LGBTQ history and culture. His writing career started in 1975 and ranged through at least 2010. Two of his six books won Lambda Literary Awards.

== Life ==
Miller was born in Kingston, New York in 1945 and graduated from Kingston High School and Brown University. He was the news editor of the Gay Community News, the first weekly gay and lesbian newspaper in the United States, from 1975 to 1978, and also served as the paper's features and managing editor. He worked as a staff writer at the Boston Phoenix in the early 1980s.

== Writing ==
Miller's most acclaimed book, In Search of Gay America, published in 1989, was the first book to examine gay and lesbian life outside the large metropolitan areas. Miller's subjects include the openly gay mayor of a small Missouri town, gay dairy farmers in Minnesota, a lesbian coal miner in West Virginia, and gay Native Americans in South Dakota. The book won a Lambda Literary Award in 1991 and was honored by the American Library Association. His second book, the ambitious Out in the World (1992), looked at gay and lesbian life in twelve countries around the world, including South Africa, Egypt, Thailand, Japan, Australia, and Denmark. His next book, Out of the Past, was an international survey of LGBT history beginning in 1869 which was the first time the word "homosexuality" appeared in print. First published in 1995, the book ranged in scope from the story of Plains Indians to the Nazi persecution of homosexuals to America in the age of AIDS. A revised, updated version appeared in 2006.

His interest in gay history led him to write Sex-Crime Panic, an investigative account of the round-up and incarceration of 20 gay men in Sioux City, Iowa, during the McCarthy period. The round-up followed the brutal, unsolved murders of two small children. Although the men were never linked to the crimes in any way, they were labeled as "sexual psychopaths" and incarcerated in a locked ward of a state mental hospital until they were deemed "cured." Sex-Crime Panic received a Lambda Literary Award in 2002, as well as the Randy Shilts Award for Gay Nonfiction from the Publishing Triangle. The story was almost completely unknown until Miller discovered it, tracking down participants and victims in detective-like fashion.

In a departure, Miller's 2008 book, Kartchner Caverns was a nonfiction account of the discovery of stunning limestone caves in southern Arizona by two young men in 1974, and their 25-year quest to save them from environmental degradation. The caves have been preserved as Kartchner Caverns State Park. Kartchner Caverns was the winner of the 2009 Arizona Book Award for "best book," awarded by the Arizona Publishing Association. It also received a Southwest Book Award for 2008 from the Border Regional Library Association.

Miller's latest book, Banned in Boston is an account of the New England Watch and Ward Society's 90-year role as Boston's "moral guardian," censoring books and plays and raiding places of gambling and prostitution. The powerful organization was funded by Boston's "Brahmin" elite. The book was published by Beacon Press in the fall of 2010.

Miller's freelance articles have appeared in the Boston Globe Magazine, the Los Angeles Times, the Cleveland Plain-Dealer, CommonWealth Magazine, the Unitarian Universalist World, The Advocate, and Out. He teaches journalism and nonfiction writing at Tufts University in Medford, Massachusetts.

== Bibliography ==
- In Search of Gay America: Women and Men in a Time of Change (1989)
- Out in the World: Gay and Lesbian Life from Buenos Aires to Bangkok (1992)
- Out of the Past: Gay and Lesbian History from 1869 to the Present (1995, revised and updated edition, 2006)
- Sex-Crime Panic: A Journey to the Paranoid Heart of the 1950s (2002)
- Kartchner Caverns: How Two Cavers Discovered and Saved One of the Wonders of the Natural World (2008)
- Banned in Boston: The Watch and Ward Society's Crusade Against Books, Burlesque, and the Social Evil (2010)
