= Patricia Santana =

Patricia Santana (born 1955)

- Born: 1955 (age 70–71); San Diego, California, U.S.
- Education: University of California, San Diego; University of California, Los Angeles
- Occupation: Novelist
- Children: 2
- Writing career
- Notable awards: Premio Aztlán Literary Prize (2008); American Book Award (2009)
- Website: www.patriciasantana.net

Patricia Santana (born 1955 San Diego) is a Latina American novelist.

== Life ==
She is the eighth of nine children of Mexican immigrants. Her parents are from El Grullo, Jalisco.

She graduated from the University of California, San Diego, and from the University of California, Los Angeles with a master's degree in Comparative Literature.

She is a Spanish instructor at Cuyamaca Community College and is also an occasional visiting lecturer at the University of California, San Diego, where she teaches creative writing.

She is the mother of Deborah and Isaac.

== Awards ==
- 2009 American Book Award
- 2008 Premio Aztlán Literary Prize
- 2003 Best Books for Young Adults by the Young Adult Library Services Association (YALSA)
- 1999 University of California, Irvine Chicano/Latino Literary Contest.

== Works ==
- Motorcycle Ride on the Sea of Tranquility. UNM Press. 2002. ISBN 978-0-8263-2436-8. (reprint 2004)
- Ghosts of El Grullo. UNM Press. 2008. ISBN 978-0-8263-4409-0.
