= Norma Elia Cantú =

American writer (born 1947)

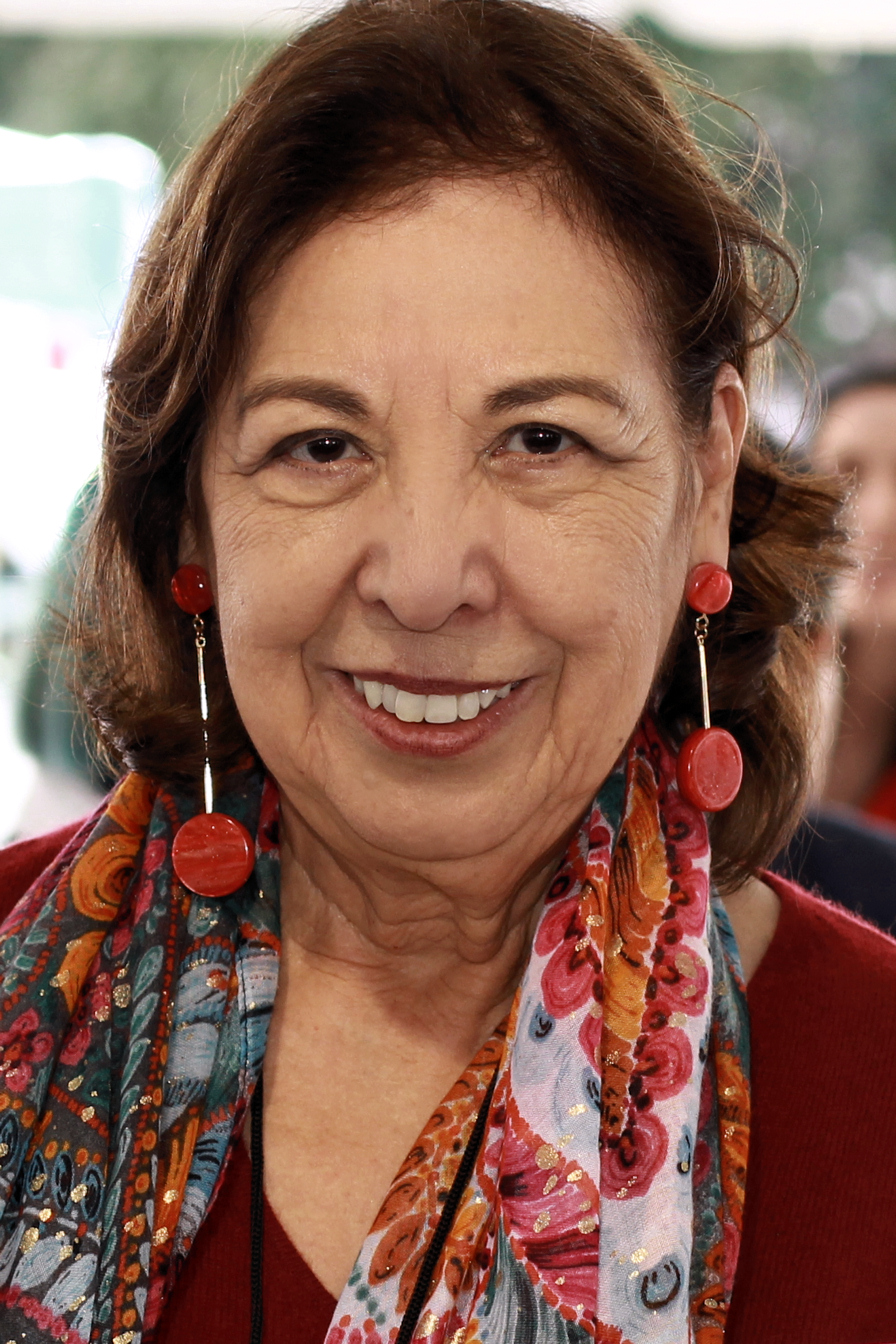
- Cantú at the 2019 Texas Book Festival
- Born: Norma Elia Cantú Becerra; January 3, 1947 (age 79); Nuevo Laredo, Tamaulipas, Mexico
- Education: Texas A&M International University; Texas A&M University–Kingsville; University of Nebraska–Lincoln
- Occupations: Writer, professor
- Website: inside.trinity.edu/directory/ncantu

Norma Elia Cantú (born January 3, 1947) is a Chicana postmodernist writer and the Murchison Professor in the Humanities at Trinity University in San Antonio, Texas.

== Early life and education ==
She was born in Nuevo Laredo, Tamaulipas, Mexico, to Florentino Cantú Vargas and Virginia Ramon Becerra. She was reared in Laredo in Webb County, Texas, and attended public schools there.

Cantú received her AA degree from Laredo Community College in 1970.She received her Bachelor of Science degree in English and political science from Texas A&I University at Laredo, now Texas A&M International University in Laredo, from which she graduated summa cum laude in 1973. She received her Master of Science degree in English with a minor in political science from Texas A&I University‑Kingsville in 1976 and her PhD in English from the University of Nebraska–Lincoln in 1982.

She has been on the faculty of Texas A&M International University, the University of Texas at San Antonio and the University of Missouri-Kansas City. In 2016, she was named Murchison Professor in the Humanities at Trinity University.

== Awards and recognition ==
- 1996: Aztlan Prize
- 2002: Elli Köngäs Maranda Prize from the Women's Section of the American Folklore Society, for Chicana Traditions: Change and Continuity (co-editor and contributor)
- 2002: American Educational Studies Association Critics' Choice Award, Race in the College Classroom (contributor)
- 2003: Américo Paredes Prize, American Folklore Society
- 2003: Distinguished Scholar Award from the Division on Chicana and Chicano Literature of the Modern Languages Association
- 2008: National Association of Chicana and Chicano Studies Scholar of the Year
- 2008: Cátedra Laborious from the Universidad de Monterrey, Monterrey, Nuevo León
- 2010: Exceptional Texas Woman, by the Veteran Feminists of America, Texas, March 19, Dallas, Texas
- 2010: UTSA Globalization Award, April
- 2010: Elvira Cordero de Cisneros Macondo Foundation Award
- 2011: Fellow of the American Folklore Society
- 2012: Beca Nebrija de Creación Literaria, Instituto Franklin, Universidad de Alcalá de Henares; Inducted into the Texas Institute of Letters
- 2013: Yellow Rose of Texas Education Award; HOPE Cultural Arts Award; the Letras de Aztlán from NACCS Tejas Foco
- 2014: Elected to the board of the American Folklore Society
- 2015: Outstanding Latina of Kansas City (Women's History Month), DosMundos Newspaper
- 2016: Escuela Tlatelolco's Champion of Change Award for Art, Literature, & Culture, Denver, Colorado
- 2020: The Rudolfo Anaya Best Latino Fiction Focused Book Award from the International Latino Book Awards
- 2020-21: President of the American Folklore Society.

== Publications ==
=== Books ===
- 2024. Fiestas in Laredo: Matachines, Quinceañeras, and George Washington's Birthday. University of Texas Press.
- 2020. meXicana Fashions: Politics, Self Adornment and Identity Construction, University of Texas Press.
- 2020. Teaching Gloria Anzaldúa: Pedagogies and Practices for our Classrooms and Communities, Co-editor with Aída Hurtado. University of Arizona Press.
- 2019. Cabañuelas: A Love Story.Co-editor with Margaret Cantú Sánchez and Candace De Leon Zepeda University of New Mexico Press.
- 2019. Meditación Fronteriza: Poems of Life, Love and Work, under review, University of Arizona Press
- 2016. Co-editor with Inés Hernández Ávila, Entre Malinche y Guadalupe: Tejanas in Literature and Art. 2016.
- 2016. Entre Malinche y Guadalupe: Tejanas in Literature and Art. Co-edited with Inés Hernández Ávila, University of Texas Press

Co-editor with Rita Urquíjo Ruiz, The Plays of Silviana Wood. University of Arizona Press

- 2015. Translator: Borderlands/La Frontera. Universidad Autónoma de Mexico
- 2015. Canícula: Snapshots of a Girlhood en la Frontera—Updated 20th Anniversary Edition, University of New Mexico Press
- 2014. Diálogo Special Issue: Poetry, co-edited with Juana Goergen
- 2013. "Los Tecolotes," in ¡Arriba Baseball! A Collection of Latino/a Baseball Fiction. VAO Publishing.
- 2012. Moctezuma’s Table: Rolando Briseño’s Mexicano and Chicano Tablescapes, Texas A&M University Press
- 2011. Paths to Discovery: Autobiographies of Chicanas with Careers in Mathematics, Science and Engineering. UCLA Chicano Studies Research Center Press
- 2010. El Mundo Zurdo: Selected Works from the Meetings of the Society for the Study of Gloria Anzaldúa 2007 & 2009, Co-Editor. (Aunt Lute Books)
- 2010. Inside the Latin@ Experience: A Latino Studies Reader, co-edited with Maria Franquiz (Palgrave/Macmillan)
- 2009. Dancing Across Borders: Danzas y Bailes Mexicanos. Co-edited with Olga Nájera-Ramírez and Brenda Romero. University of Illinois Press.
- 2009. Prietas y Güeras: Proceedings of the First Conference on the Life and Work of Gloria Anzaldúa. Co-editor. San Antonio, TX: Adelante Project.

I embroider borders.... Poetry book, limited edition. Southwest School of Arts and Crafts.

- 2006. Editor. Flor y Ciencia: Chicanas in Mathematics, Science and Engineering. AAAS Adelante Project.
- 2001. Co-editor with Olga Najera Ramírez. Changing Chicana Traditions, University of Illinois Press.
- 2001. Telling to Live: Latina Feminist Testimonios. Co-editor with the Latina feminist Group. Individual pieces included: "Getting there cuando no hay camino," "A Working Class Brujas Fears," and two poems: "Migraine" and "Reading the Body." Duke University Press.
- 2000. Santuarios: Program Essay. The Guadalupe Cultural Arts Center Rockefeller Gateways Program Performance.
- 2000. "Realidad Fronteriza" in Cariatides.
- 2000. "Police Blotter," Colorado Review.
- 1999. Canícula: Imágenes de una niñez fronteriza. Houghton Mifflin Co.
- 1999. "Diamond," A Quien Corresponda, Revista Literaria, Cd. Victoria, Tamps.
- 1998. "Tino" and "Perpetuo Socorro," in Aztlán in Viet Nam, University of California Press.
- 1998. "Capirotada" in Stirring Prose, Texas A&M Press. 1998.
- 1998. "Adios en Madrid," Proyecto Scheherazade, electronic journal.
- 1998. "El luto," in Ventana Abierta.
- 1998. "Decolonizing the Mind" and "Trojan Horse" in Floricanto Sí: U.S. Latina Poetry. New York: Penguin.
- 1997. Canícula: Snapshots of a Girlhood en la frontera. Albuquerque: University of New Mexico Press, paperback edition.
- 1997. "Bailando y Cantando," short story, "Las diosas," "Decolonizing the Mind," and "Fiestas de diciembre," poems in Blue Mesa Review, number 9, University of New Mexico.
- 1996. "Letters Home/Letters from Home," sporadic column of poetry and prose in the monthly LareDOS.
- 1995. "Tino" and "Papi," in In Short. Judith Kitchen and Mary Paumier Jones, eds. New York: Norton.
- 1995. Canícula: Snapshots of a Girlhood en la frontera. Albuquerque: University of New Mexico Press. Winner, Premio Aztlán Literary Prize.
- 1994. "Nebraska Family: A Triptych," Nebraska Humanist.
- Chapters 42–44 from Canícula and "Action, Thought, Spirit"(poem) in Prairie Schooner.1992 *"Snapshots of a Girlhood en la frontera," in The Texas Humanist.
- "Se me enchina el cuerpo al oir tu cuento", short story. New Chicano/a Literature, University of Arizona Press.
- 1983. "Unemployed", poem, Huehuetitlan.
- 1983. "Untitled", poem, Huehuetitlan.

=== Book reviews ===
- 2015 Letters to the Poet from his Brother, in Aztlán
- 2010 There Was a Woman, in Journal of Folklore Research
- 2005 Homegirls in the Public Sphere in National Women's Studies Journal
- 1995 "Fiesta, fe, y cultura," in American Folklore Society Journal.
- 1995 "Carry Me Like Water" in The Washington Post, Book World.
- 1995 "My History Not Yours: The Formation of Mexican American Autobiography," in Western Historical Quarterly.
- 1993 "No Short Journeys: The Interplay of Culture in the History and Literature of the Borderlands," in Western Historical Quarterly.
- 1992 "Footlights Across the Border: A History of Spanish Language Professional Theater on the Texas Stage," Journal of Popular Culture.
- 1991 "Mixed Blessings," in Texas Humanist, Spring.
- 1984 "Woman of Her Word," in La Red/The Net.
- 1984 "Cuentos: Stories by Latinas," in La Red/The Net.
- 1979 "Chicano Voices," in English in Texas.
- 1978 "Selina," in Prairie Schooner.
- 1978 "César Chávez: Autobiography of La Causa," in Prairie Schooner.
