= Tomás and the Library Lady =

1997 picture book by Pat Mora

- Author: Pat Mora
- Illustrator: Raúl Colón
- Genre: Children's picture book
- Publisher: Knopf Books for Young Readers
- Publication date: September 23, 1997
- Publication place: United States
- Pages: 40
- ISBN: 0-679-80401-3
- OCLC: 20169322
- LC Class: PZ7.M78819To 1997

Tomás and the Library Lady is a children's picture book written by Mexican-American writer Pat Mora and illustrated by Raúl Colón; it was published in 1997.

Based on a true story, it details the circumstances behind Tomás Rivera, the son of a migrant farm worker during the 1940s in the Midwest United States. Feeling a little out of place since his family's move to Iowa from Texas and wanting to know more than just his grandfather's stories, Tomás stumbles into a library and is welcomed by the librarian. Through her patience and understanding, Tomás develops a love for books and learning that he always wanted to have. The warmth and graciousness of the librarian was a catalyst to Tomás' lifelong love of learning which culminated in his becoming a chancellor at a university.

The story was later adapted into a musical.
