= Into the Beautiful North =

2009 novel by Luis Alberto Urrea

- First edition cover
- Author: Luis Alberto Urrea
- Language: English
- Genre: contemporary novel
- Set in: Mexico and the US
- Publisher: Little, Brown
- Publication date: 2009
- Publication place: US
- Pages: 352
- ISBN: 978-0-316-02527-0 Hardback edition

Into the Beautiful North is a novel written by Luis Alberto Urrea and published by Little, Brown. Written in 2009, it is set in Mexico and then the United States as the main character Nayeli seeks seven men to help defend her small Mexican town against the bandidos who plan to take over.

== Synopsis ==
The town of Tres Camarones is accosted by bandidos at a time when most of the men in the town have gone to America to look for work. After watching The Magnificent Seven, Nayeli, a nineteen-year-old girl, decides to travel to America to convince seven of the town's best fighters to come back and fight the bandidos.

Nayeli and her three friends Yolo, Vampi and Tacho, begin their journey with the financial support of Tía Irma, the mayor of the town. Along the way they lose their luggage and a good deal of their money. In Tijuana, a garbage picker and skilled fighter named Atómiko helps them across the border. Once across, Nayeli seeks out the assistance of Matt, a missionary who had come to their town three years in the past.

Tia Irma comes to San Diego to meet up with them, and while she continues searching for more candidates to bring back to Mexico, Nayeli and Tacho leave for Kankakee, Illinois, to look for Nayeli's father. However, they find that her father has a new family, and she leaves without speaking to him. Meanwhile, Tia Irma has selected twenty-seven men to bring back to Tres Camarones.

== Adaptations ==
Into the Beautiful North was turned into a play in 2016 by Karen Zacarias. It was first performed in Milagro Theater Portland in Portland, Oregon.

It also served as the inspiration for Joseph Brent's work of the same name performed by the jazz trio 9 Horses and orchestra, commissioned by University of Arkansas at Little Rock and performed at the ACANSA Festival.

== Reception ==
A review in SF Gate compares the plot and writing style unfavorably with Urrea's earlier novel, and a Kirkus Reviews criticized the ending, and the book overall as not the author's best work. Bookpage was more positive, calling the book "thoroughly enjoyable", and Publishers Weekly extols its colorful characters and humor.

Lucy Popescu feels that the novel "loses some of its momentum when Nayeli and Tacho set off alone on the last leg of their journey across a huge swathe of the United States". This loss of momentum "is corrected with the pair’s final, redemptive meeting with a border agent. Throughout the novel there is keen sense of nostalgia for a Mexico that has disappeared, and one senses Urrea’s regret for the simple rural life that has been usurped by the allure of the beautiful north." She compares the draw of the workers to the beautiful north to the story of the farmers in the 1930s drawn to the supposed Eden of California, told in The Grapes of Wrath.

The book was selected by the UC Santa Barbara Library as its 2017 book for the university-wide reading program "UCSB Reads".

== Other editions ==
The novel has also been issued in Spanish as Rumbo al hermoso norte : una novela by Little, Brown, translated by Enrique Hubbard Urrea, ISBN 9780316025263, also published in 2009.
