= Denise Chávez =

American novelist

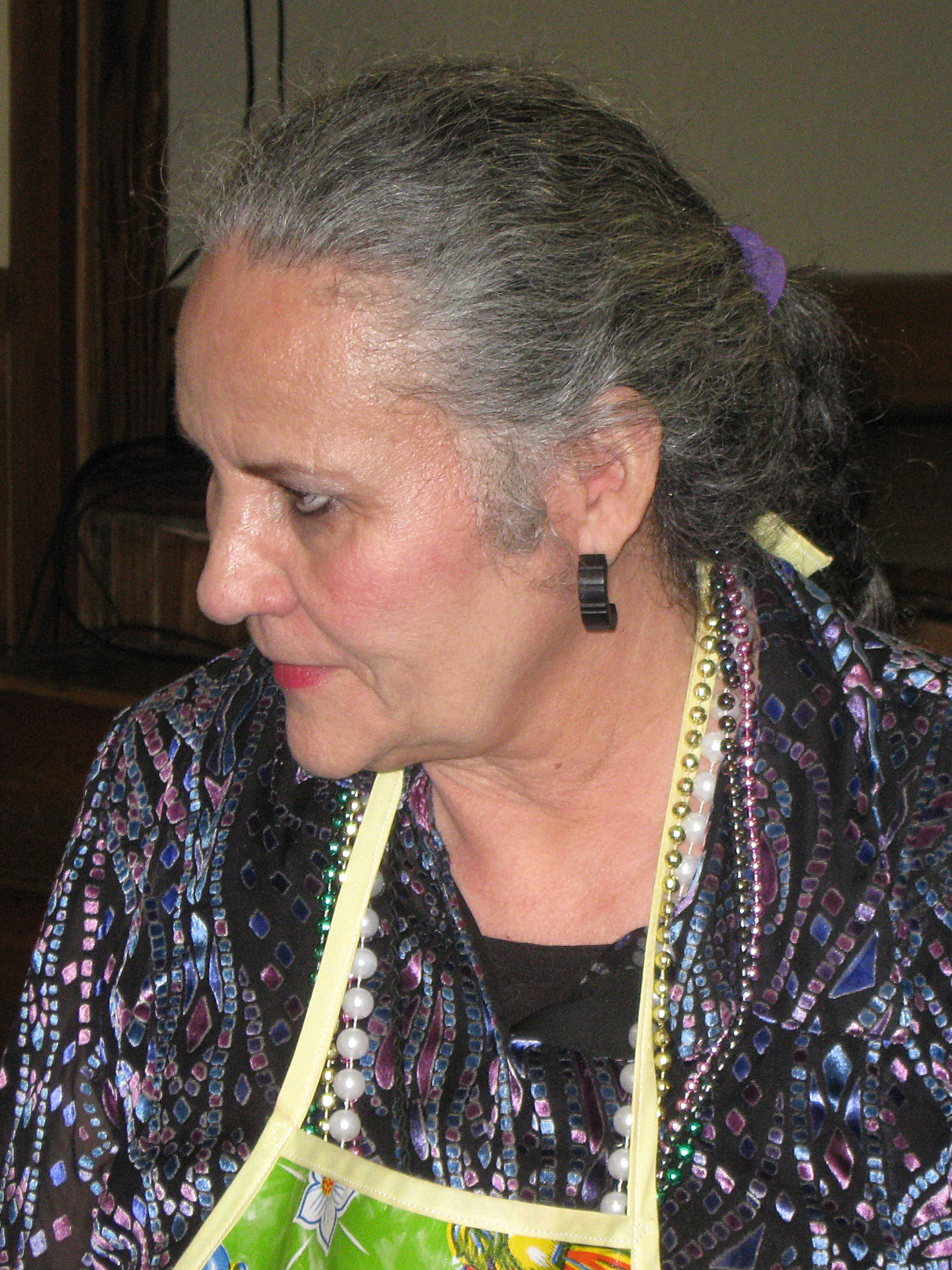
- Denise Chávez, 2010
- Born: August 15, 1948 (age 78); Las Cruces, New Mexico, U.S.
- Education: New Mexico State UniversityTrinity University; University of New Mexico (MFA)
- Occupation: Writer
- Writing career
- Genres: Fiction, nonfiction, plays

Denise Elia Chávez (born August 15, 1948) is a Chicana author, playwright, and stage director. She has also taught classes at New Mexico State University. She is based in New Mexico.

== Early life and education ==
Chávez was born to a Mexican American family in Las Cruces, New Mexico. The first story she wrote was when she was 8, about the willow tree outside her house. Chávez attended Catholic school for twelve years. She graduated from Madonna High School in Mesilla. While in High School, she won a full tuition scholarship to study drama at New Mexico State University (NMSU). She received her Bachelor's from NMSU in 1971 and master's degrees in Theater from Trinity University in 1974. While in college, she began writing dramatic works. Later she entered the MFA program at the University of New Mexico (UNM) and earned a degree in Creative Writing in 1984 under the direction of mentors Rudolfo Anaya and Tony Hillerman.

== Career ==
Chávez taught creative writing at New Mexico State University, New Mexico Community College and at the University of Houston. Later, she created The Border Book Festival in her hometown of Las Cruces. Currently she is developing, along with her husband, Daniel Zolinsky, a Borderland Art and Resource center, Museo de La Gente/Museum of the people, archiving the history and story of her borderland community.

In 1985, she earned the Rockefeller Playwriting Fellowship. She has received various awards, including the American Book Award in 1995, New Mexico Governor's Award in Literature in 1995, the Premio Aztlán Literary Prize, the Mesilla Valley Author of the Year Award, and the 2003 Hispanic Heritage Award for Literature. She earned the Lifetime Achievement Award, Paul Bartlett Ré Peace Prize from the University of New Mexico in 2016. Chávez has also been awarded a Premio Aztlán Literary Prize. She serves on the editorial advisory board of the Latin American and Latinx literature, philosophy, and arts journal Chasqui.

== Writing ==
Chávez says that when she is creating new work, she writes in whatever language she is "in the mood to write in," using either English or Spanish. Her work questions reality and examines how people's lives follow patterns. She is also interested in writing about people who are often overlooked by society, or considered "invisible." Her characters have individual and unique voices.

In 1986, Chávez published her first collection of short stories, The Last of the Menu Girls. The stories are about a Chicana young adult living in New Mexico. The female characters in these stories are "well-focused, occasionally naive but never weak," writes the Albuquerque Journal.

Her first novel was Face of An Angel, published in 1994. Face took her seven and a half years to complete. The Albuquerque Journal compared it to Thomas Wolfe's Look Homeward, Angel, writing that "Both novels are mammoth in text, deal with family trappings and bickering, are suspiciously autobiographical and give eloquent testimony to oppressive, mundane living."

Chávez published a novel, Loving Pedro Infante in 2001. It is a humorous story about "mismatched lovers," according to the Arizona Daily Star. A story from Gannett News Service wrote that the story explores "excuses women make for their involvement with men who are no good for them."

== Works ==
- The Last of the Menu Girls, Arte Publico Press, 1986
- Face of An Angel, Farrar, Straus & Giroux, 1994
- Loving Pedro Infante, Farrar, Straus & Giroux, 2001
- A Taco Testimony: Meditations on Family, Food and Culture, Rio Nuevo 2006
- The King and Queen of Comezón, University of Oklahoma Press, 2014
- Street of Too Many Stories, Conocimientos Press, 2024

== Plays ==
Chávez has written plays in both English and Spanish which have been performed in both Europe and the United States. Some remain unpublished.

- Novitiates (1971)
- The Flying Tortilla Man (1975)
- Rainy Day Waterloo (1976)
- The Third Door (1978)
- Sí, hay posada (1980)
- The Green Madonna (1982)
- La morenita (1983)
- El más pequeño de mis hijos (1983)
- Plague-Time (1984)
- Novena Narrativas (1986)
- Language of Vision (1987)
