= Premio Aztlán Literary Prize =

The Premio Aztlán Literary Prize is a national literary award for emerging Chicana and Chicano authors, founded in 1993 by Rudolfo and Patricia Anaya. The award was originally sponsored by the University of New Mexico, but was moved in 2008 to the National Hispanic Cultural Center.

The award is limited to short-story collections and novels (but not children's or young-adult novels) published by a professional press during the previous calendar year. Moreover, the author must be living and must not have published more than two books. The winner receives $1,000 and presents a lecture at that year's National Latino Writers Conference.

Award recipients include (years refer to the year of publication; the award is given the following year):

- 2013: ire'ne lara silva, flesh to bone
- 2011: Lucrecia Guerrero, Tree of Sighs
- 2009: Gloria Zamora, Sweet Nata: Growing Up in Rural New Mexico
- 2008: Patricia Santana, Ghosts of El Grullo
- 2007: Verónica Gonzalez, Twin Time or How Death Befell Me
- 2006: Reyna Grande, Across a Hundred Mountains
- 2005: Gene Guerin, Cottonwood Saints
- 2004: Mary Helen Lagasse, The Fifth Sun
- 2003-2000: no award
- 1999: Sergio Troncoso, The Last Tortilla and Other Stories
- 1998: Ronald Ruiz, Giuseppe Rocco
- 1997: Pat Mora, House of Houses
- 1996: Wendell Mayo, Centaur of the North
- 1995: Norma Elia Cantú, Canícula: Snapshots of a Girlhood en la Frontera
- 1994: Denise Chávez, Face of an Angel
- 1993: Alicia Gaspar de Alba, The Mystery of Survival and Other Stories
