= Pat Mora =

American poet and author

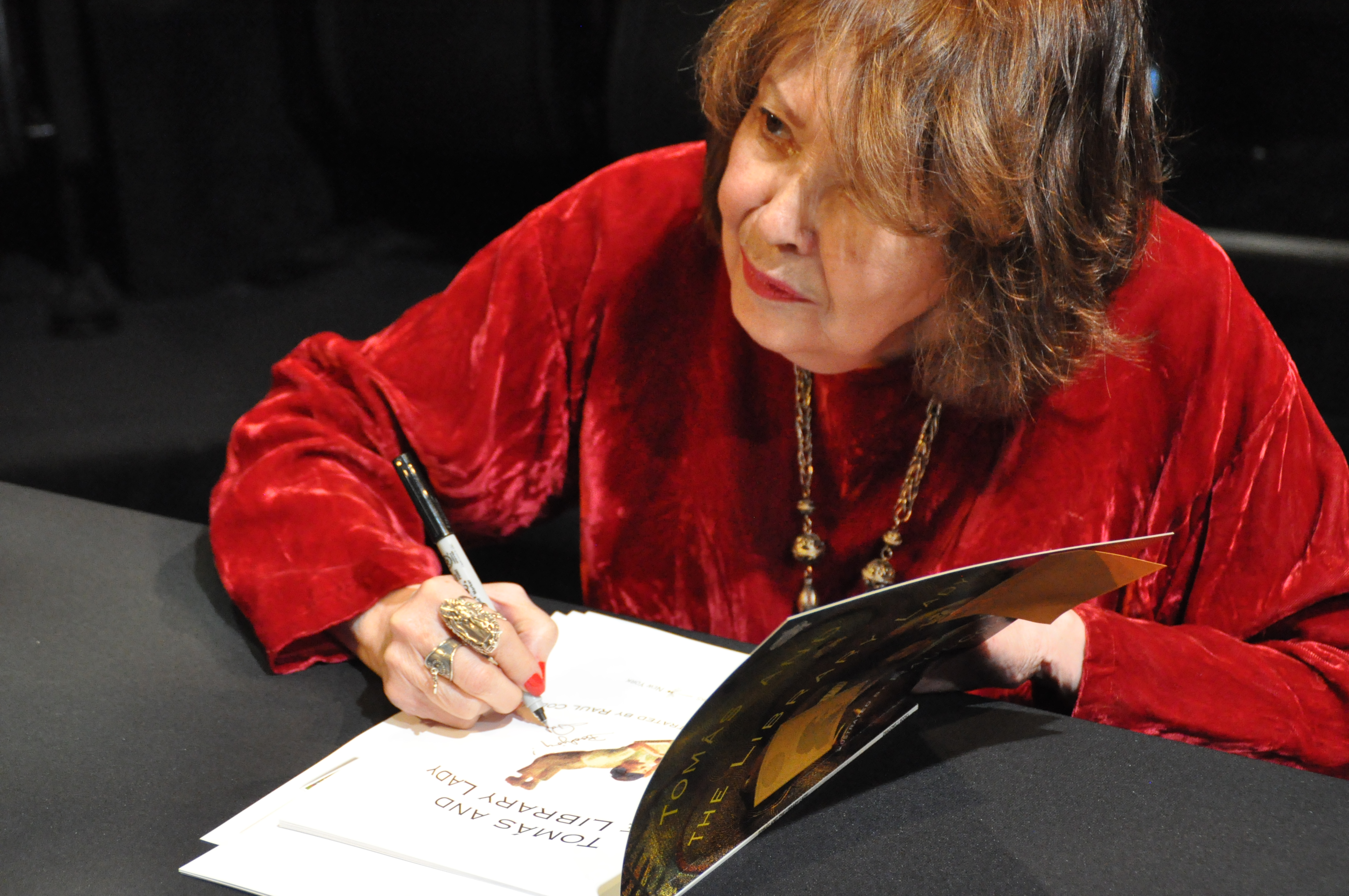
- Mora at a book signing in 2015
- Born: Pat Mora; January 19, 1942 (age 84)
- Education: M.A.
- Alma mater: University of Texas at El Paso
- Occupation: author
- Writing career
- Genres: Poetry, Nonfiction, Children's literature

Pat Mora (born January 19, 1942) is an American poet and author of books for adults, teens and children. A native of El Paso, Texas, her grandparents came to the city from north Mexico. She graduated from the University of Texas at El Paso, received Honorary Doctorates from North Carolina State University and SUNY Buffalo, and was awarded American Library Association Honorary Membership. A literacy advocate, in 1996, she founded Children's Day, Book Day (Spanish: El día de los niños, El día de los libros), now celebrated across the country each year on April 30.

== Career ==
Pat Mora taught for the El Paso Public Schools, the El Paso Community College, and the University of Texas at El Paso where she then became Assistant to the Vice President for Academic Affairs and later Assistant to the President.

=== Writing ===
Mora began professionally writing in the early 1980s. She has produced writing for all age groups, creating picture books, poetry and biographies. Her choice of subject matter and theme is often shaped by life on the Mexico–United States border where she was born and spent much of her life. she says: "The desert, mi madre, is my stern teacher...The Southwestern landscape has been my world, my point of reference." Her writing highlights the human and cultural diversity of the southwestern United States and northern Mexico. She writes of the rich sense of "diversity within Mexican American experience." Mora celebrates diversity and is opposed to the idea of an American monoculture; therefore, she is very concerned with preserving cultural heritage: "I write because I believe that Mexican Americans need to take their rightful place in U.S. literature. We need to be published and to be studied in schools and colleges so that the stories and ideas of our people won't quietly disappear."

Mora is a strong advocate of bilingual literacy. Early in her career, she coined a concept she named "bookjoy" which describes the pleasure of reading.

Mora's style of writing often incorporates code-switching between English and Spanish words. As a writer, she allows a free-flow of ideas in her first draft: she doesn't question her motivation for writing and writes using "as little conscious analysis as possible." She prefers to use her critical eye for editing her own work later.

Mora has collaborated with her daughter, Libby Martinez, on two children's books: I Pledge Allegiance and Bravo, Chico Canta! Bravo!, for which Martinez is the illustrator.

=== Children's Day, Book Day ===
In the mid-nineties, Mora founded the community-based, family literacy initiative, El día de los niños, El día de los libros/Children's Day, Book Day (Día). In 1997, she received the official endorsement of REFORMA, the National Association to Promote Library and Information Services to Latinos and the Spanish-Speaking for the project. Mora based Dia on Mexican National Children's Day festivities held since 1925. The two part celebration of Día includes a commitment to promote literacy and bookjoy, and culminates in book celebrations that unite communities. When choosing a date to kick off Día, she chose April 30 because it was the last day of National Poetry month. The first Dia took place in 1996.

Children's Day, Book Day, has grown in the U.S. to include all children, languages and cultures. Mora has expressed the desire to have books, celebrations and materials for Día to include "all languages spoken in the United States."

In 2004, the Association for Library Services to Children's (ALSC) division of the American Library Association became an active partner for Dia. Mora says, "If we want our nation to be a country of readers...[we] need to work together to inspire communities in nurturing reading families."../

== Awards ==
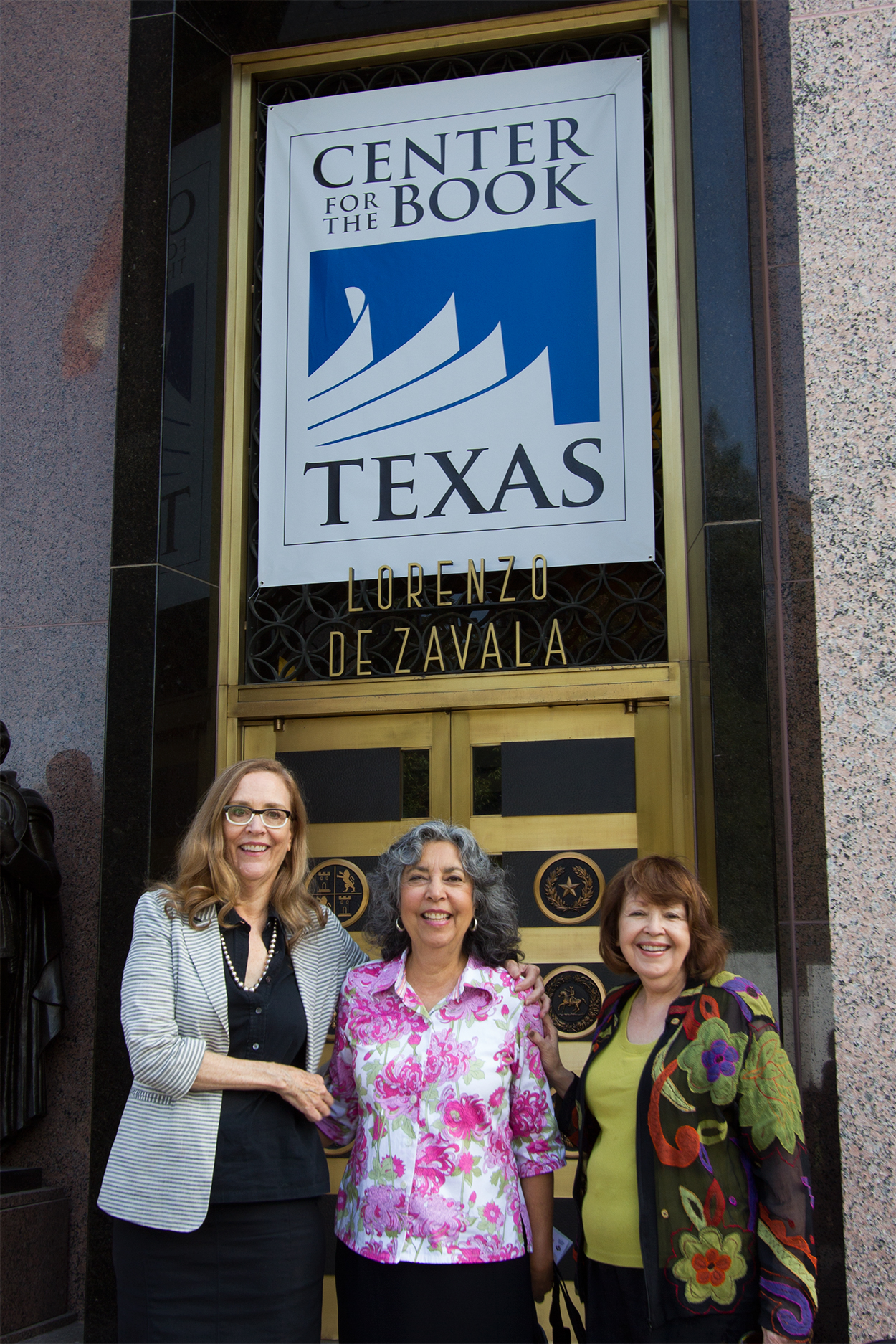
Mora in 2015, along with authors Sarah Bird (left) and Carmen Lomas Garza (center)

- Texas Writer Award (2015)
- International Latino Book Award, Best Children's Fiction Picture Book: The Beautiful Lady: Our Lady of Guadalupe, (2013).
- Loretto Legacy Award for Arts and Literature (2012).
- Con Tinta Achievement for Literary Activism from Association of Writers & Writing Programs (2012)
- Gelett Burgess Children's Book Award: Gracias~Thanks, (2011).
- Eureka! Children's Nonfiction Award, Silver Honor, California Reading Association: Dizzy in Your Eyes: Poems About Love, (2010).
- Literary Legacy Award, El Paso Community College (2010).
- International Latino Book Award for Best Children's Picture Book in English: Abuelos, (2009).
- Mountains & Plains Independent Booksellers Association Poetry Award, Adobe Odes, (2008).
- Bronze Medal in Poetry, Independent Publisher Book Awards: Adobe Odes, (2008).
- Border Regional Library Association, Southwest Book Award: House of Houses, (2008).
- Luis Leal (writer) Award for Distinction in Chicano/Latino Letters, University of California at Santa Barbara (2008).
- International Latino Book Award, Best Poetry in English: Adobe Odes, (2007).
- Robert Long Medal for Distinuguished Contributions to Celebrating the Cultural Diversity of Children, University of Alabama at Birmingham (2007).
- Pura Belpré Honor Award for narrative: Doña Flor: A Tall Tale about a Giant Woman with a Great Big Heart, (2006).
- National Hispanic Cultural Center Literary Award (2006).
- Amelia Bloomer Project Recommended List: A Library for Juana: The World of Sor Juana Inéz, (2004).
- Arizona Governor's Book Award: Confetti: Poems for Children, (2004).
- Pellicer-Frost Bi-national Poetry Award, Ford Foundation, FEMAP Foundation and Museo de Arte e Historia del INBA-Cd. Juarez, (1999).
- Fahd Elbadry Southwest Book Award: A Birthday Basket for Tia, (1992).
- Poetry Award, Conference of Cincinnati Women (1990).
- El Paso Herald-Post Writer's Hall of Fame Inductee (1988).
- Kellogg National Fellowship Leadership Award (1986).
- Border Regional Library Association Award: Borders (1986).
- Border Regional Library Association Award: Chants (1984).
- Southwest Council of Latin American Studies, Harvey L. Johnson Award (1984).
- National Association for Chicano Studies, Creative Writing Award (1983).

Mora has received Honorary Doctorates in Letters from North Carolina State University and SUNY Buffalo and is an Honorary Member of the American Library Association. She was a recipient of a Civitella Ranieri Fellowship to write in Umbria, Italy. She was a Visiting Carruthers Chair at the University of New Mexico, a recipient and judge of the Poetry Fellowships from the National Endowment for the Arts, and a recipient and advisor of the Kellogg National Fellowships.

== Bibliography ==
- Encantado: Desert Monologues. University of Arizona Press. 2018. ISBN 9780816538027.
- Adobe Odes. University of Arizona Press. 8 November 2006. ISBN 9780816526109.
- Agua Santa: Holy Water. Beacon Press. 20 July 1997. ISBN 9780807068298.
- Aunt Carmen's Book of Practical Saints. Beacon Press. 30 September 1997. ISBN 9780807072066.
- Communion. Arte Publico Press. May 1991. ISBN 9781558850354.
- Borders. Arte Publico Press. 1986. ISBN 9780934770576.
- Chants. Arte Publico Press. 1984. ISBN 9780934770248.

Adult Books: Nonfiction

- Zing!: Seven Creativity Practices for Educators and Students. Corwin Press. 30 March 2010. ISBN 9781412978392.
- House of Houses. Beacon Press. 16 September 2001. ISBN 9780807072059.
- Nepantla: Essays From The Land In The Middle. University of New Mexico Press. 1 March 1993. ISBN 9780826314543.

Young Adult Books: Poetry

- Dizzy in Your Eyes: Poems about Love. Knopf Books for Young Readers. 12 January 2010. ISBN 9780375843754.
- My Own True Name: New and Selected Poems for Young Adults. Arte Publico Press. 1 January 2000. ISBN 9781558852921.
- La Migra

Children's Books:

- Bookjoy, Wordjoy. illustrated by Raúl Colón. Lee & Low Bookss. 2018. ISBN 9781620142868.
- The Remembering Day/El día de los muertos. illustrated by Robert Casilla. Piňata Books. 1 October 2015. ISBN 9781558858053.
- Water Rolls, Water Rises/El agua rueda, el agua sube. illustrated by Meilo So. Children's Book Press. 1 October 2014. ISBN 9780892393251.
- I Pledge Allegiance. co-authored with Libby Martinez illustrated by Patrice Barton. Random House Children's Omni. 1 January 2014. ISBN 9780307931818.
- The Beautiful Lady: Our Lady of Guadalupe. illustrated by Steve Johnson and Lou Fancher. Knopf Books for Young Readers. 1 January 2012. ISBN 9780375868382.
- Book Fiesta! Celebrate Children's Day, Book Day/Celebremos el Dia de los libros. illustrated by Rafael López. Rayo. 10 March 2009. ISBN 9780061288777.
- Wiggling Pockets/Los bolsillos saltarines. illustrated by Maribel Suárez. Rayo. 1 June 2009. ISBN 9780060850470.
- A Piñata in a Pine Tree: A Latino Twelve Days of Christmas. illustrated by Magaly Morales. Clarion Books. 14 September 2009. ISBN 9780618841981.
- Sweet Dreams/Dulces Suenos. illustrated by Maribel Suárez. Rayo. 27 May 2008. ISBN 9780060850418.
- Join Hands!. illustrated by George Ancona. Charlesbridge. 1 January 2008. ISBN 9781580892032.
- Let's Eat!/A Comer!. illustrated by Maribel Suárez. Rayo. 1 March 2008. ISBN 9780060850395.
- Doña Flor: A Tall Tale About a Giant Woman With a Great Big Heart. illustrated by Rafael López. Lee & Low Books. 1 October 2007. ISBN 9781584302711.
- ¡Marimba!: Animales From A to Z. illustrated by Doug Cushman. Clarion Books. 13 November 2006. ISBN 9780618194537.
- Gracias/Thanks. illustrated by John Parra. Lee & Low Books. 1 July 2005. ISBN 9781600602580.
- The Song of Saint Francis and the Animals. illustrated by David Frampton. Eerdmans Books for Young Readers. 16 August 2005. ISBN 9780802852533.
- Doña Flor: A Tall Tale About a Giant Woman With a Great Big Heart. illustrated by Raúl Colón. Knopf Books for Young Readers. 11 October 2005. ISBN 9780375823374.
- A Library for Juana: The World of Sor Juana Inés. illustrated by Beatriz Vidal. Knopf Books for Young Readers. 12 November 2002. ISBN 9780375806438.
- Maria Paints the Hills. illustrated by Maria Hesch. Museum of New Mexico Press. 1 October 2002. ISBN 9780890134108.
- Love to Mama: A Tribute to Mothers (editor). illustrated by Paula S. Barrigan M. Lee & Low Books. 1 April 2001. ISBN 9781584302353.
- Tomas and the Library Lady. illustrated by Raúl Colón. Turtleback Books. 22 February 2000. ISBN 9780613283625.
- The Rainbow Tulip. illustrated by Elizabeth Sayles. Viking Children's Books. 1999. ISBN 9780670872916.
- This Big Sky. illustrated by Steve Jenkins. Scholastic Inc. April 1998. ISBN 9780590371209.
- Delicious Hullabaloo/Pachanga Deliciosa. illustrated by Steve Jenkins. Piňata Books. 1 January 1998. ISBN 9781558852464.
- Confetti. illustrated by Enrique Sanchez. Lee & Low Books. 1 October 1996. ISBN 9781880000250.
- Uno, Dos, Tres: One, Two, Three. illustrated by Cecily Lang. Clarion Books. 1 April 1996. ISBN 9780395672945.
- The Race of Toad and Deer. illustrated by Domi. Orchard Books. 1 September 1995. ISBN 9780531094778.
- The Gift of the Poinsettia/El Regalo de La Flor de Nochebuena. illustrated by Daniel Lechón. Arte Publico Press. 1 January 1995. ISBN 9781558851375.
- Agua, Agua, Agua. illustrated by José Ortega. Good Year Books. 1 September 1994. ISBN 9780673361950.
- Pablo's Tree. illustrated by Cecily Lang. Simon and Schuster. 1994. ISBN 9780027674019.
- A Birthday Basket for Tía. illustrated by Cecily Lang. Macmillan Publishing Company. 1992. ISBN 9780027674002.
- Bravo, Chico Canta! Bravo!
- The Desert Is My Mother/El desierto es mi madre(bilingual)
- Abuelos
- The Bakery Lady/La señora de la panaderia (bilingual)
- Listen to the Desert: Oye al desierto
- My Family/Mi Familia series: Here Kitty, Kitty/¡Ven gatita, ven! (bilingual)
- The Night the Moon Fell

== Family ==
Pat Mora raised her 3 children and worked in El Paso until 1989, when she moved to Cincinnati, Ohio. She is married to Vern Scarborough, a professor of anthropology. She lives in Santa Fe, New Mexico.
