= Border Regional Library Association =

The Border Regional Library Association (B.R.L.A.) promotes libraries and librarianship in the tri-border region of West Texas, Southern New Mexico and Northern Chihuahua, Mexico. The non-profit organization was founded in 1966 and, as of 2009, has over 100 members including libraries, librarians, trustees, and library paraprofessionals. B.R.L.A. events and awards include an annual continuing education workshop and banquet, Librarian and Staff Member of the Year awards and annual scholarship awards.

The organization is best known for its annual Southwest Book Awards for noteworthy books about the Southwest published in any genre and geared toward any audience. Past winners include James Carlos Blake, Charles Bowden, Dennis DeConcini, Tomie dePaola, Arturo Islas, Neil Miller, Pat Mora, Benjamin Alire Sáenz, Rubén Salazar, Sergio Troncoso, and Luis Alberto Urrea.

In 2025 awards were to The Molino by Melani Martinez and Frontera Madre(hood): Brown Mothers Challenging Oppression and Transborder Violence at the U.S.- Mexico Border, edited by Cynthia Bejarano and Maria Cristina Morales.

== See also ==
- List of libraries in the United States
