= Luis Alberto Urrea =

American novelist and poet (born 1955)

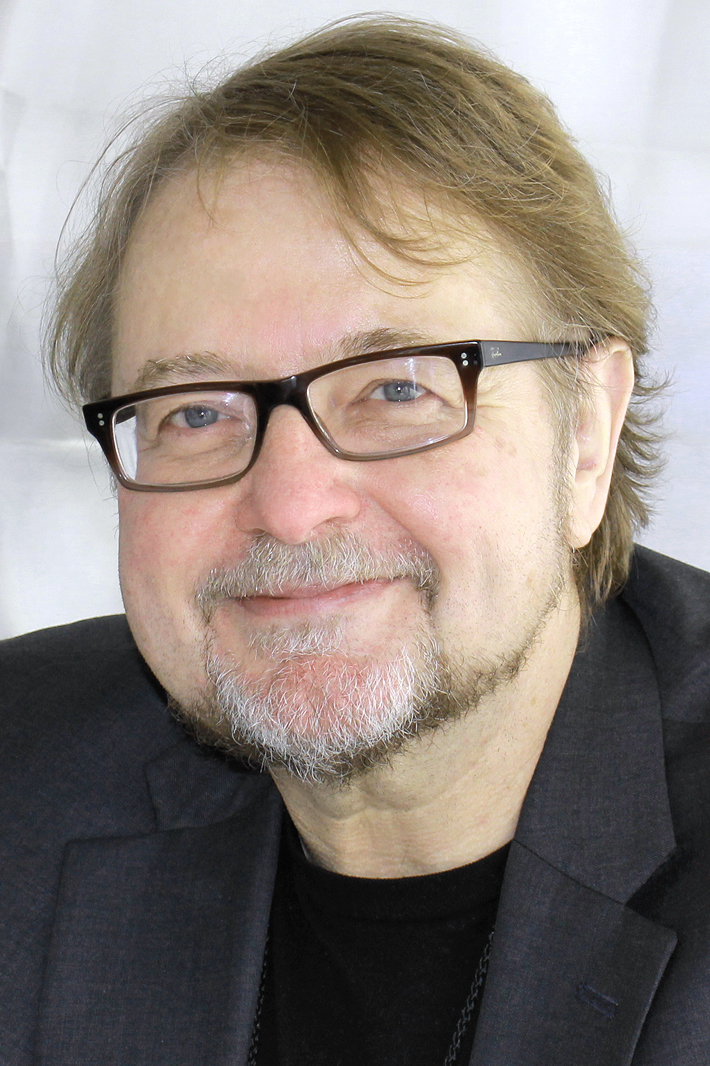
- Urrea at the 2015 Texas Book Festival
- Born: August 20, 1955 (age 71); Tijuana, Mexico
- Citizenship: US
- Education: University of California, San Diego, University of Colorado at Boulder
- Occupations: Novelist, essayist
- Writing career
- Genres: poetry, novel, nonfiction
- Notable works: Nobody's Son: Notes from an American Life, The Hummingbird's Daughter
- Notable awards: American Book Award 1999; Latino Literature Hall of Fame 2000; Edgar Award 2010; Lannan Literary Award 2004
- Website: luisurrea.com

Luis Alberto Urrea (born August 20, 1955) is a Mexican-American author, poet, and essayist. He is a Pulitzer Prize finalist and the best-selling author of 19 books.

== Life ==
Luis Alberto Urrea was born in Tijuana, Mexico, to a Mexican father and an American mother. His father, Alberto Urrea Murray, was from the Mexican state of Sinaloa, while his mother, Phyllis Dashiell, was from Staten Island, New York. Urrea has been an American citizen since birth.

Urrea contracted tuberculosis as a child. His family moved to the U.S. to seek better medical care for him, settling in the South San Diego neighborhood of Logan Heights. They later moved to Clairemont, a newer subdivision in the city of San Diego. Both of his parents worked in San Diego.

While Urrea was growing up, his mother encouraged him to read and write. She motivated him to attend college and apply for grants that would help pay for his college education. Urrea earned an undergraduate degree in writing from the University of California, San Diego in 1977. He completed his graduate studies at the University of Colorado at Boulder.

The same year Urrea graduated from college, his father was murdered while on a trip to Mexico to retrieve money he had saved up for his son's graduation gift.

Before becoming a professional author, Urrea worked odd jobs, including as a relief worker in Tijuana, as a film extra, and as a teachers aide in the Chicano Studies department in San Diego's Mesa College. He also worked as a columnist/editor/cartoonist for several publications.

In 1982, Urrea moved to Boston to begin teaching expository writing and fiction workshops at Harvard University. He has also taught at Massachusetts Bay Community College, the University of Colorado Boulder, and University of Louisiana at Lafayette.

Urrea's mother died in 1990, bringing him back to California to settle her affairs, and parts of Across the Wire were published in the San Diego Reader.

Urrea married in 1987, and divorced in 1993. He has children. He currently lives with his family in Naperville, Illinois, where he is a distinguished professor of creative writing at the University of Illinois at Chicago.

== Writing career and notable works ==
Frequent themes found in Urrea's works include grief, love, and family. He often draws inspiration from his own life and the experiences of his family members. Although borders are a common topic, Urrea says, "I am more interested in bridges, not borders."

Urrea's memoir, Nobody's Son: Notes from an American Life, details Urrea's life growing up with a Mexican father and an American mother, including his parents' cultural clashes and divorce, the violence and racism he experienced as a child, and his journey to find himself.

In 1980, Urrea published an essay to process his grief over his father's murder.

In 1994, Urrea published his first novel, In Search of Snow, a coming-of-age adventure of a boy in 1950s Arizona. Into the Beautiful North (2009) is a novel about a young woman's quest to find herself on both sides of the American-Mexican border. The Devil's Highway (2004) is a nonfiction account of a group of Mexican immigrants lost in the Arizona desert.

In two heavily researched historical novels, The Hummingbird's Daughter (2005) and Queen of America (2011), Urrea tells the story of his father's aunt, Teresita Urrea, who was known as "The Saint of Cabora" and "The Mexican Joan of Arc." The House of Broken Angels (2018), a novel, was partially inspired by the death of Urrea's half-brother, who was raised in Mexico.

== Awards ==
Urrea's first book, Across the Wire, was named a New York Times Notable Book and won the Christopher Award in 1993.

In 1994, he won the Colorado Book Award in poetry for The Fever of Being as well as the Western States Book Award in poetry. He was also included in The 1996 Best American Poetry collection.

In 1999, Urrea won an American Book Award for his memoir, Nobody's Son: Notes from an American Life.

His book of short stories, Six Kinds of Sky, was named the 2002 small-press Book of the Year in fiction by the editors of ForeWord magazine.

In 2000, he was voted into the Latino Literature Hall of Fame following the publication of Vatos.

The Devil's Highway won the 2004 Lannan Literary Award, the Border Regional Library Association's Southwest Book Award, and was a finalist for the Pulitzer Prize and for the Pacific Rim Kiriyama Prize. It was also optioned for a film by CDI Producciones. The book was adopted as the 2010 One Book for Sac State.

His short story "Amapola", which can be found in Phoenix Noir edited by Patrick Millikin and Urrea's own The Water Museum, won the Edgar Award in 2010 for best mystery short story.

In 2019, he was presented the Founders Award at the Tucson Festival of Books. The award recognizes exceptional literary achievement.

== Reviews ==
Urrea has been called "a literary badass who still believes in love" and a "master storyteller with a rock and roll heart."

Mythili G. Rao of the New York Times compares both of Urrea's heavily researched novels in an article titled "The Most Dangerous Girl in Mexico goes to America"; Rao writes, "Where The Hummingbird's Daughter was driven by an otherworldly mysticism and the call of fate, its sequel is largely occupied with the ordinary troubles of mortal life". Stacey D'Erasmo, also from the New York Times has reviewed Urrea's novel "The Hummingbird's Daughter". Praising him for his literature style she writes, "The style that Urrea has adopted to tell Teresita's—and Mexico's—story [is]...simultaneously dreamy, telegraphic and quietly lyrical. Like a vast mural, the book displays a huge cast of workers, whores, cowboys, rich men, bandits and saints while simultaneously making them seem to float on the page". Joanne Omang, from the Washington Post writes, "The Hummingbird's Daughter is paced beautifully, inexorable and slow-seeming as life itself. The daily trivia of Teresita's childhood is as fascinating as the punctuations of amazements, beauties and horrors". Luis Alberto Urrea is also admired by Sandra Dijkstra of Publishers Weekly; she writes, "His brilliant prose is saturated with the cadences and insights of Latin-American magical realism and tempered by his exacting reporter's eye and extensive historical investigation".

The House of Broken Angels, his novel published in March 2018, is based in part on the death of the author's eldest brother, his half-brother raised in Mexico. Urrea said in an interview with Terry Gross that he expanded the novel with a sense of the status between Mexico and the United States since Trump became president of the United States in 2017: "But then as I expanded it, ... it started taking on more of a cultural statement and turned into a novel, which seemed to want to become epic. I couldn't shake my growing sense of rage and astonishment at the tone." Michael Upchurch in the Chicago Tribune remarked the wonderful turns of phrase in the novel about a family sprawling across the United States-Mexico border and the sense of place, "You couldn't ask for a more vivid sense of place either, whether you're talking physical surroundings ("The funeral home had a fake Germanic facade and stood across the street from a taco shop, a gas station and a Starbucks") or the way people think and speak. In an interview with Claire Kirch published in Publishers Weekly, Urrea said that "he has never before received so much prepub buzz as he has for The House of Broken Angels. Kirch quoted him as saying that "It seems to be striking a nerve," he says. "I wasn't really trying to be subversive, but I was trying to be subversive at the same time. I'm always trying to, using literature, subvert people's responses."

== Bibliography ==
=== Poetry ===
- The Fever of Being. West End Press. 1994. ISBN 978-0-931122-78-1.
- Ghost Sickness. Cinco Puntos Press. 1997. ISBN 978-0-938317-30-2.
- Vatos. José Galvez, Josae Galvez (photog.). Cinco Puntos Press. 2000. ISBN 978-0-938317-52-4.
- "Walking Backwards in the Dark". Virginia Quarterly Review. Spring 2007.
- Tijuana Book of the Dead. Soft Skull Press. 2015. ISBN 978-1619024823

=== Short stories ===
- Six Kinds of Sky. Cinco Puntos Press. 2002. ISBN 978-0-938317-63-0. "Luis Alberto Urrea."
- The Water Museum. Little, Brown and Company. 2015. ISBN 978-0316334372

=== Novels ===
- In Search of Snow. University of Arizona Press. 1994. ISBN 978-0-8165-2015-2.
- The Hummingbird's Daughter. Little, Brown and Company. 2005. ISBN 978-0-316-74546-8.
- Into the Beautiful North. Little, Brown and Company. 2009. ISBN 978-0-316-02527-0.
- Queen of America. Little, Brown and Company. 2011. ISBN 978-0-316-15486-4.
- The House of Broken Angels. Little, Brown and Company. March 2018. ISBN 978-0-316-15488-8.
- Good Night, Irene: A Novel. Little, Brown and Company. May 2023. ISBN 978-0-316-265850.

=== Memoirs ===
- Wandering Time: Western Notebooks. University of Arizona Press. 1999. ISBN 978-0-8165-1866-1.
- Nobody's Son: Notes from an American Life. University of Arizona Press. 1998. ISBN 978-0-8165-2270-5.

=== Non-fiction ===
- Across the wire: life and hard times on the Mexican border. John Lueders-Booth (photog.). Anchor Books. 1993. ISBN 978-0-385-42530-8.
- By the Lake of Sleeping Children. Anchor Books. 1996. ISBN 978-0-385-48419-0.
- The Devil's Highway. Little, Brown and Company. 2004. ISBN 978-0-316-74671-7.

=== Interviews ===
- "On Standing at Neruda's Tomb: An interview with Martín Espada". Poetry Foundation. 2006.
