= Crossing Borders: Personal Essays =

- Author: Sergio Troncoso
- Language: English
- Genre: Essays
- Publisher: Arte Público Press
- Publication date: Sep 2011
- Publication place: United States
- Media type: Print (paperback)
- Pages: 201 pp
- ISBN: 978-1-558857100
- LC Class: PS3570.R5876 Z46 2011

Crossing Borders: Personal Essays is a collection of essays by Sergio Troncoso first published in 2011 by Arte Público Press. The book of sixteen personal essays explores how Troncoso made the leap from growing up poor along the Mexico-U.S. border to the Ivy League, his wife's battle against breast cancer, his struggles as a writer in New York and Texas, fatherhood, and interfaith marriage.

== Summary and Main Themes ==
“On good days I feel I am a bridge. On bad days I just feel alone,” Sergio Troncoso writes in this collection of personal essays in which he seeks to connect the humanity of his Mexican family to people he meets on the East Coast, including his wife’s Jewish kin. Raised in a home steps from the Mexican border in El Paso, Texas, Troncoso crossed what seemed an even more imposing border when he left home to attend Harvard College.

Initially, “outsider status” was thrust upon him; later, he adopted it willingly, writing about the Southwest and Chicanos in an effort to communicate who he was and where he came from to those unfamiliar with his childhood world. He wrote to maintain his ties to his parents and his abuelita, and to fight against the elitism he experienced at an Ivy League school. “I was torn,” he writes, “between the people I loved at home and the ideas I devoured away from home.”

Troncoso writes to preserve his connections to the past, but he puts pen to paper just as much for the future. In his three-part essay entitled “Letter to My Young Sons,” he documents the terror of his wife’s breast cancer diagnosis and the ups and downs of her surgery and treatment. Other essays convey the joys and frustrations of fatherhood, his uneasy relationship with his elderly father, and the impact his wife’s Jewish heritage and religion have on his Mexican-American identity.

Crossing Borders: Personal Essays reveals a writer, father and husband who has crossed linguistic, cultural and intellectual borders to provoke debate about contemporary Mexican-American identity. Challenging assumptions about literature, the role of writers in America, fatherhood and family, these essays bridge the chasm between the poverty of the border region and the highest echelons of success in America. Troncoso writes with the deepest faith in humanity about sacrifice, commitment and honesty.

== Content ==
"Crossing Borders"
Troncoso explores the relationship between Latinos and Jews, and interfaith marriage.

"Literature and Migration"
The author adopts an outsider status to write from a new perspective in fiction and writes simply to combat abstractions and also to communicate complex ideas to a broader community.

"Fresh Challah"
Dolores Rivero, Troncoso's abuelita, taught him to fight for what is right, as well as to be self-critical, which helped him to appreciate Judaism.

"Letter to my Young Sons-Part One"
The author's wife is diagnosed with breast cancer, and with two young children the couple struggles with their emotions and scrambles to understand the diagnosis.

"Letter to my Young Sons-Part Two"
Laura's day for surgery arrives, and she endures seven hours of procedures. Her parents arrive from Boston. A week after the surgery, the author and his wife receive startling news.

"Letter to my Young Sons-Part Three"
Laura returns home and perseveres through the pain, with their young children nearby. She undergoes aggressive chemotherapy and radiation treatment, while Troncoso helps her to recover.

"A Day Without Ideas"
The ideas for stories are everywhere if we can resist seeing the world without curiosity.

"Latinos Find an America on the Border of Acceptance"
The author reflects on the acceptance of the Latino culture in the U.S and discusses the Euro-centric view on various topics including economics, politics and philosophy. The focus should be on the poor immigrants in the U.S. who struggle against poverty, racism and language barriers.

"The Father Is in the Details"
Troncoso writes about fatherhood on the Upper West Side of New York City, and the daily effort to create a nurturing, yet challenging environment for his children.

"Terror and Humanity"
Written on September 11, 2001, this powerful editorial appeared the next day in Newsday. The author details the philosophical links between hatred and abstraction, and how to combat this hatred as he expresses sympathy for the victims of terrorism.

"Trapped"
Troncoso writes about fighting to find time for his literary work amid his busy life, while knowing that his obligations as a father and husband are vital to him.

"Apostate of my Literary Family"
The author writes about his experiences as a board member of the Hudson Valley Writers' Center in Sleepy Hollow, New York.

"This Wicked Patch of Dust"
A fight with his father in Ysleta reveals the complex family relationships that shaped the author, including the identification with his mother as a curious reader.

"Chico Lingo Days"
Troncoso includes several entries from his blog, Chico Lingo, about xenophobia against Latino immigrants in New York, Latino writers in Texas, his mother as his heroine, and the solitary life of the writer.

"Finding our Voice-From Literacy to Literature"
Troncoso delivers the White Fund Lecture in Lawrence, Massachusetts on February 25, 2010. The author examines the immigrant values that helped him succeed in the Ivy League and beyond, and how to translate those values to places beyond the border.

"Why Should Latinos Write Their Own Stories?"
The point of writing stories should be not only to preserve cultural heritage, but also to challenge it.

== Literary significance & criticism ==
A reviewer from the Portland Book Review wrote in a four-starred review: "Troncoso writes about crossing personal, religious, and cultural borders, as well as literal borders, and brings the reader into experiences they are not likely to have on their own."

A reviewer from the El Paso Times wrote: "Sergio Troncoso's Crossing Borders: Personal Essays is an engrossing and revealing peek behind the curtain of one writer's creative process, development and struggles."

Crossing Borders: Personal Essays won the Bronze Award for Essays from ForeWord Reviews, and Second Place for Best Biography in English in the International Latino Book Awards. The Hispanic Reader chose it as one of the best books of 2011.
