= Bedichek =

Bedichek is a surname. Notable people with the surname include:

- Lillian Greer Bedichek (1885–1971), American educator, wife of Roy
- Roy Bedichek (1878–1959), American writer, naturalist, and educator
- Sarah Bedichek Pipkin (1913–1977), American geneticist, daughter of Lillian and Roy
