= J. Frank Dobie =

American writer (1888–1964)

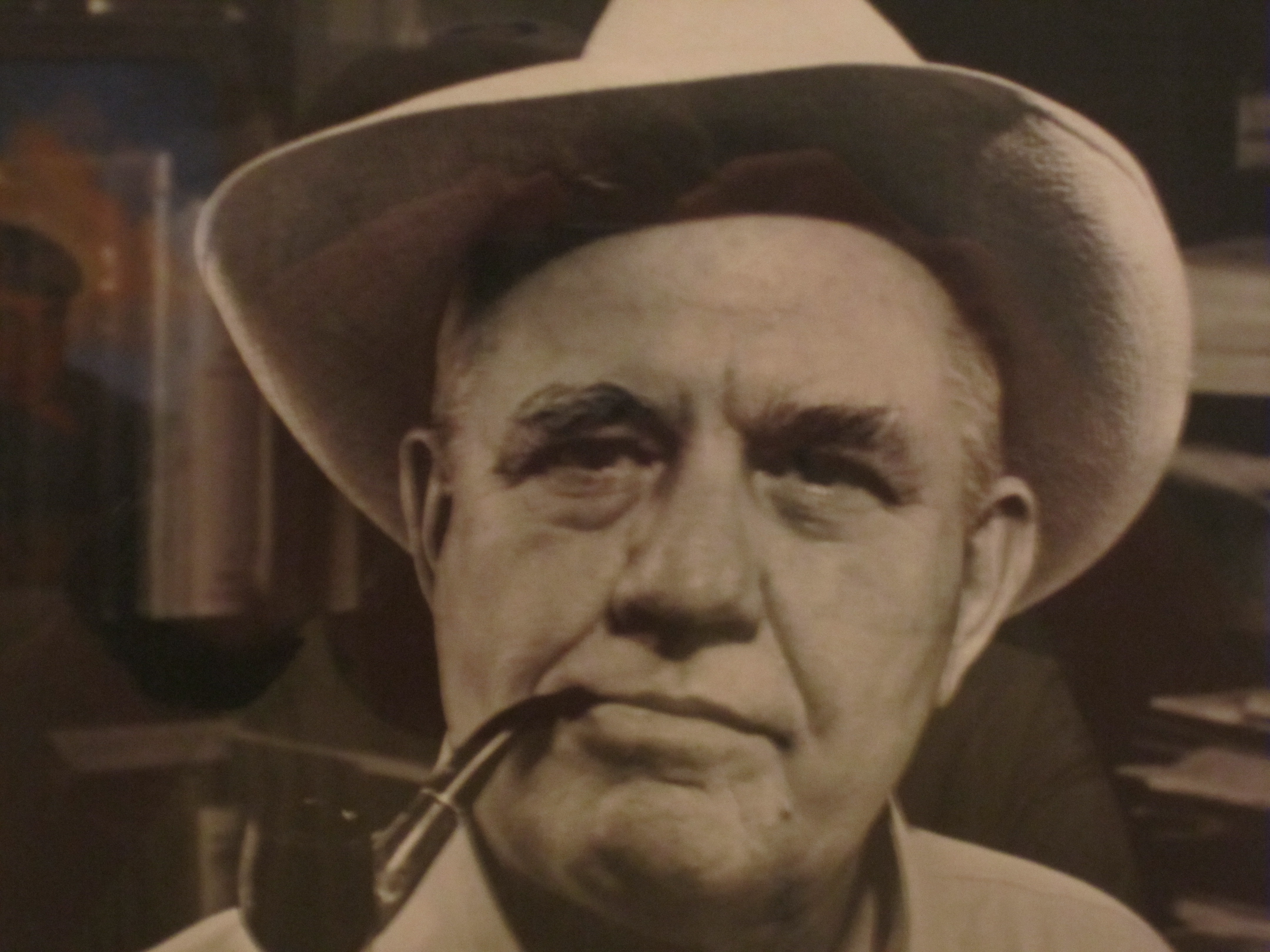
- Born: James Frank Dobie; September 26, 1888; Live Oak County, Texas
- Died: September 18, 1964 (aged 75); Austin, Texas, U.S.
- Resting place: Texas State Cemetery
- Education: Southwestern University
- Occupation: Writer
- Spouse: Bertha McKee Dobie (m. 1916)
- Writing career
- Period: 1919–1964

James Frank Dobie (September 26, 1888 – September 18, 1964) was an American folklorist, writer, and newspaper columnist best known for his many books depicting the richness and traditions of life in rural Texas during the days of the open range. He was known in his lifetime for his outspoken liberal views against Texas state politics, and he carried out a long, personal war against what he saw as braggart Texans, religious prejudice, restraints on individual liberty, and the mechanized world's assault on the human spirit. He was instrumental in saving the Texas Longhorn breed of cattle from extinction.

== Early years ==
James Frank Dobie was born on a ranch in Live Oak County, Texas, and was the eldest of six children. When he was young, his father Richard read to him from the Bible and his mother Ella read to him from books such as Ivanhoe and Pilgrim's Progress. At 16, Dobie moved to Alice, the seat of Jim Wells County, Texas, where he lived with his grandparents and finished high school at William Adams High School.

In 1906, Dobie enrolled in Southwestern University in Georgetown, Texas, where he was introduced to English poetry by a professor who urged him to become a writer. While in college he also met Bertha McKee (1890–1974), whom he married in 1916.

After graduating in 1910, Dobie worked briefly for newspapers in San Antonio and Galveston before gaining his first teaching job at a high school in Alpine in southwestern Texas. In 1911, he returned to Georgetown to teach at Southwestern Preparatory School.

In 1913, Dobie went to Columbia University to work on a master's degree, and the next year, returned to Texas to join the faculty of the University of Texas at Austin. He also became affiliated with the Texas Folklore Society. In 1917, he left the university to serve in the field artillery in World War I. He was briefly sent overseas at the end of the war and was discharged in 1919.

== Early writing career ==
Dobie began to publish his first articles in 1919; by 1920 he was writing articles mostly about Longhorn cattle and life in the southwest. That year, he left the University of Texas faculty to work on his uncle's ranch in La Salle County, north of Laredo, where he developed a desire to write about Texas ranch life and southwestern folklore.

After a year on the ranch, Dobie returned to UT and began to use its library and the Texas Folklore Society's resources to write about the vanishing way of life on rural Texas ranches. In 1922, he became the Texas Folklore Society's secretary and began a program for publication, holding the post of secretary-editor for 21 years. In 1923, unable to get a promotion without a PhD, Dobie accepted a job at Oklahoma A&M College as chair of its English department. While in Oklahoma, he wrote for the Country Gentleman. He returned to Austin in 1925 after receiving a token promotion with help from friends.

In 1929, Dobie published his first book, A Vaquero of the Brush Country, which helped establish him as an authentic voice of Texas and southwestern culture. While the title page said the book was "Partly from the Reminiscences of John Young", the author was given as J. Frank Dobie. The book was the result of a collaboration between Dobie and Young, a former open-range vaquero who had fought against the encroachment of barbed wire on southwest Texas's rangelands. Young had written Dobie for help in writing his autobiography, saying that he intended to use the profits from the book to build a hotel for cattlemen in San Antonio. Dobie agreed to help Young; he rearranged the raw material of Young's reminiscences and rewrote it in the prose of historical writing.

Although Lawrence Clark Powell, an authority on western writing at the University of California, wrote in the preface to the 1957 edition, "it was unmistakably Dobie on every page, in every paragraph, sentence, and word", in 1994 Young's heirs filed a petition with the U.S. District Court For the Western District Of Texas asserting that Young and Dobie coauthored the book. The matter of A Vaquero of the Brush Country's authorship was ultimately resolved in this litigation between Young's descendants, Dobie's estate, and the University of Texas, holders of interests in the copyright. The court ruled that Young and Dobie are the joint authors of A Vaquero of the Brush Country.

In 1931, Dobie published Coronado's Children, a collection of folklore about lost mines and lost treasures. This was followed by a series of books in the 1930s. In 1941 he published The Longhorns, a commercial and critical success that got a full-page review in The New York Times. It is considered one of the best descriptions of the traditions of the Texas Longhorn cattle breed during the 19th century. In 1932, UT named Dobie the first full professor not to possess a PhD.

In 1937, Dobie was visiting Thomas Calloway Lea, Jr., a friend and prominent attorney in El Paso. After seeing Lea's son Tom Lea's artwork, Dobie asked the younger man to illustrate the book he was working on, Apache Gold and Yaqui Silver. Tom Lea also illustrated The Longhorns, as well as a biography of Texas pioneer John C. Duval. Dobie and Lea remained good friends for the rest of Dobie's life.

In 1939, Dobie began publishing a Sunday newspaper column in which he routinely poked fun at Texas politics. A liberal Democrat, he often found an easy target for his words in the antics of the state's politicians. Of state politics, he once wrote, "When I get ready to explain homemade fascism in America, I can take my example from the state capitol of Texas."

== Later writing career ==
During World War II, Dobie taught American history at Cambridge University, and he took a leave of absence from the University of Texas to return to Europe after the war to teach in England, Germany, and Austria, later writing of his experiences at Cambridge in A Texan in England. When the UT Board of Regents fired President Homer Rainey in 1944 for his liberal views, Dobie was outraged and made his views known publicly, causing Texas Governor Coke Stevenson to say that Dobie too should be dismissed. Dobie's subsequent request for an extension of his leave of absence was rejected, and he was dismissed from UT in 1947. After his dismissal, Dobie published another series of books and anthologies of stories about the open range.

Disney turned his story "Sancho, The Homing Steer" into an episode of The Wonderful World of Color in 1962.

== Death and legacy ==
On September 14, 1964, President Lyndon Johnson, a longtime political rival of Stevenson, awarded Dobie the Medal of Freedom. Dobie died four days later. His funeral was held in Hogg Auditorium at the University of Texas; he is interred at the Texas State Cemetery.

In 1965, Dobie was inducted into the Hall of Great Westerners of the National Cowboy & Western Heritage Museum.

=== Dobie Paisano Fellowship ===
In 1959, after a severe illness, Dobie sold his ranch in Marble Falls and bought a ranch 14 miles southwest of Austin, which he named "Paisano". He used the ranch as a writer's retreat until his death in 1964. A movement to preserve the ranch promptly started, and longtime friend Ralph A. Johnston purchased the Paisano Ranch to take it off the market. By 1966, he had transferred the deed to the University of Texas. The university has said:

Paisano will be operated by the University as a permanent memorial to J. Frank Dobie, and the primary use will be to encourage creative artistic effort in all fields, particularly in writing. It will be kept in its present more or less natural state and the ranch house will be kept in simple style, very much as it was when Frank Dobie occupied it.

Two fellowships of six months each are awarded by a committee chosen by the presidents of UT-Austin and the Texas Institute of Letters. The applicants must be native Texans, or Texas residents for at least two years, or persons whose writing is substantially identified with the state.

=== Buildings and ponds named in his honor ===
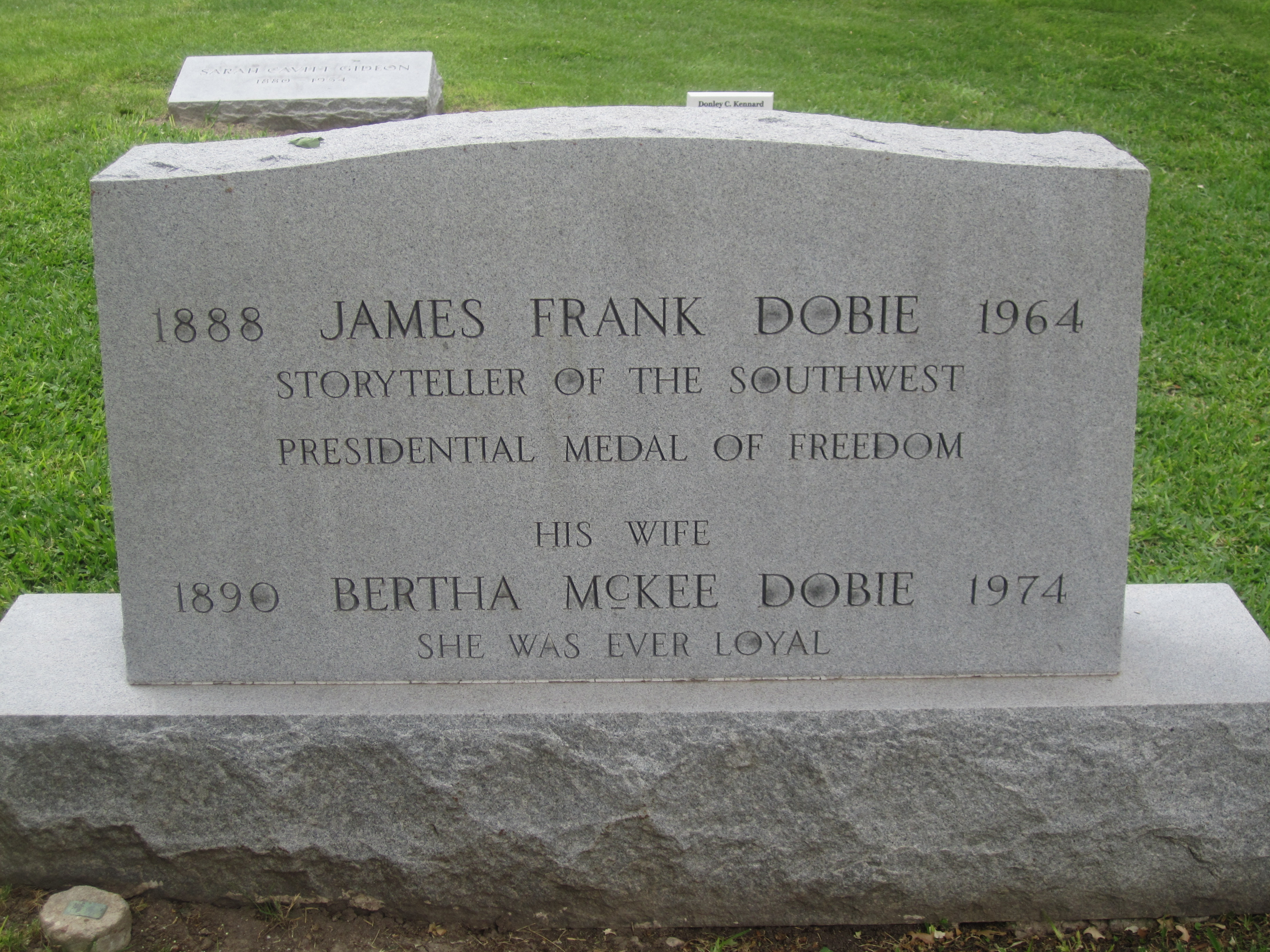
Graves of J. Frank and Bertha Dobie at Texas State Cemetery in Austin, Texas

- J. Frank Dobie Station, San Antonio, Texas 78219, (United States Postal Service)
- J. Frank Dobie High School in Houston
- J. Frank Dobie Junior High School in Cibolo
- J. Frank Dobie Middle School in Austin
- J. Frank Dobie Elementary School in Dallas
- Dobie Center in Austin
- J. Frank Dobie Museum in George West in Live Oak County
- J. Frank Dobie Fishing Pond in Nepean, Ontario

== List of works ==
- Weather Wisdom of the Texas-Mexican Border. 1923 Ebook
- A Vaquero of the Brush Country. Dallas: by John Young and J. Frank Dobie, The Southwest Press. 1929.
- Coronado's Children. Dallas: The Southwest Press. 1930.
- On the Open Range. Dallas: The Southwest Press. 1931.
- Tongues of the Monte. Garden City, N.Y.: Doubleday. 1935.
- The Flavor of Texas. Dallas: Dealey and Lowe. 1936.
- Tales of the Mustang. Dallas: Rein Co. for The Book Club of Texas. 1936.
- Apache Gold & Yaqui Silver. Boston: Little, Brown. 1939.
- John C. Duval. First Texas Man of Letters. Dallas: Southwest Review. 1939.
- The Roadrunner in Fact and Folk-lore. 1939
- The Longhorns. Boston: Little, Brown and Co. 1941.
- Guide to Life and Literature of the Southwest. Austin: U.T. Press. 1943.
- A Texan in England. Boston: Little, Brown. 1945.
- The Seven Mustangs. Address delivered at the unveiling of the monument, May 31, 1948, University of Texas, Austin. The Adams Publications, Austin, Texas,1948.
- The Voice of the Coyote. Boston: Little, Brown. 1949. Paperback edition, University of Nebraska Press, 1961.
- The Ben Lilly Legend. Boston: Little, Brown. 1950.
- The Mustangs. Boston: Little, Brown. 1952.
- Tales of Old Time Texas. Boston: Little, Brown & Co. 1955.
- Up the Trail From Texas. N.Y.: Random House. 1955.
- I'll Tell You a Tale. Boston: Little, Brown & Co. 1960.
- Cow People. Boston: Little, Brown. 1964.
- Some Part of Myself. Boston: Little, Brown. 1967.
- Rattlesnakes. Boston: Little, Brown & Co. 1965.
- Out of the Old Rock. Boston: Little, Brown & Co. 1972.
- Prefaces. Boston: Little, Brown. 1975.
- Wild and Wily Range Animals. Flagstaff: Northland Press. 1980.

Many of Dobie's works are featured in Ramon Adams's Six-Guns and Saddle Leather and The Rampaging Herd, two bibliographic works on the history of the American West and the cattle industry.

== Media ==
- A one-act play by Steve Moore, Nightswim, about Dobie, Roy Bedichek, and Walter Prescott Webb was first produced in Austin in 2004. Their friendship is narrated in William A. Owens's 1969 book Three Friends: Roy Bedichek, J. Frank Dobie, Walter Prescott Webb.
