= Manuel Gregorio Acosta =

American artist

- Born: May 9, 1921; Aldama, Chihuahua, Mexico
- Died: October 25, 1989 (aged 68); El Paso, Texas, U.S.
- Education: University of Texas at El Paso, Chouinard Art Institute, University of California, Santa Barbara
- Known for: Painting, Sculptor, Illustrator, Muralist
- Movement: Chicano Movement

Illustration of labor leader César Chávez by Acosta, was on the cover of Time, published July 4, 1969

Manuel Gregorio Acosta (May 9, 1921 – October 25, 1989) was a Mexican-born American painter, muralist, sculptor, and illustrator. His work received more recognition during the Chicano movement, and his portrait of Cesar Chavez was reproduced on the cover of Time magazine in 1969.

== Early life and education ==
Manuel Gregorio Acosta was born on May 9, 1921 into a family in Aldama, Chihuahua, Mexico. His father, Ramón P. Acosta, had fought in the Mexican Revolution with Pancho Villa, and the Mexican Revolution was a recurring theme in Manuel's paintings. The family moved to El Paso, Texas when Manuel was a child. Acosta attended Bowie High School, where he started studying art. He always seemed interested in drawings, so as practice he would mock pictures of newspapers and later started drawing pin up girls. Manuel Acosta served in the United States Air Force during World War II, during which time he continued practicing his artwork, and became an American citizen shortly after discharge.

In the fall of 1946 he attended the College of Mines and Metallurgy (now the University of Texas at El Paso), where he studied drawing and sculpture under sculptor Urbici Soler. He started to sketch people and views from El Paso's barrios in a realistic style. In 1952 he became an apprentice to painter Peter Hurd on a mural project about pioneer Texas located at the West Texas Museum in Lubbock. He spent a year at the Chouinard Art Institute in Los Angeles and six months at the University of California, Santa Barbara, before establishing his home and studio in El Paso, Texas.

== Career ==
During the height of the worker's rights movement, Acosta's portrait of Cesar Chavez was reproduced on the cover of Time magazine on July 4, 1969. The original portrait is now part of the National Portrait Gallery's permanent collection.

Acosta moved his studio home in order to make way for a new highway, and built a new adobe building at 366 Buena Vista.

== Death and legacy ==
He was bludgeoned with a lead pipe and murdered on October 25, 1989, at the age of 68, by a drunken Mexican national and is buried at Fort Bliss National Cemetery, in Texas.

A 1995 mural in El Paso was created as a tribute, "Memorial to Manuel Acosta" by artists Carlos Rossas and Felipe Gallegos.

In 2018, Acosta's work was included in the El Paso Museum of Art group exhibition, Early West Texas: Waypoint and Home, alongside artists José Cisneros and Tom Lea.

== Public collections ==
- El Paso Museum of Art
- Museum of Texas Tech University
- National Portrait Gallery
- New Mexico Museum of Art
