= José Cisneros (artist) =

Mexican-born American artist

- Born: José Barragán Cisneros; April 18, 1910; Villa Ocampo, Durango, Mexico
- Died: November 14, 2009 (aged 99); El Paso, Texas, U.S.
- Resting place: Mount Carmel Cemetery
- Years active: 1930–2009
- Known for: Historical Illustration
- Spouse: Vicenta Madera

José B. Cisneros (1910 – 2009) was a Mexican–born American artist. He is known for his historical illustrations and drawings of early Texas, specifically of horsemen including charro, vaquero, Texas rangers, and Texas cowboys. He illustrated over 300 books.

== Early life and education ==
Cisneros was born on 18 April 1910 in Villa Ocampo, Durango, Mexico to parents Fernando Cisneros and Juanita (née Barragán) Cisneros. His father was a carpenter by trade, but worked various other jobs to support the family. The Cisneros family had to run away from Mexico by late 1917 due to the dangers of the Mexican Revolution, their village and family home were destroyed. The family eventually migrated to Ciudad Juárez, Chihuahua, Mexico, and Cisneros was allowed to study English in nearby El Paso, Texas at the Lydia Patterson Institute.

In 1927 at the age of 17, he dropped out of school in order to help support the family with various odd jobs and it was during this time he creating artwork from discarded commercial signs. By 1930, his art and writing was published in magazines from Mexico including Revista de Revistas, Vida Mexicana, Todo, El León Juarense, and others. In Juarez, he joined an artists and writers club, El Ateneo Fronterizo (The Border Athenaeum).

== Career ==
Cisneros saw an established artist, Tom Lea painting a mural on the El Paso Federal Courthouse, Cisneros introduced himself and shared his drawings. It was through his relationship with Lea, Cisneros was able to connect with J. Carl Hertzog (1902-1984), a printer and publisher that hired Cisneros for illustration work. Through his collaborations with Hertzog included illustration of books, book plates, greeting cards, calendars, programs and newspapers and more. And many of the book illustrations were for various 1940s history books, which required researching for the accuracy of the image.

Cisneros designed the coat of arms for the city of Juarez. He also designed the seal for Texas Western College, and this seal was used and updated when educational organization became University of Texas at El Paso (UTEP).

In 2018, Cisneros's work was included in the El Paso Museum of Art group exhibition, Early West Texas: Waypoint and Home, alongside artists Manuel Gregorio Acosta and Tom Lea.

== Personal life ==
Cisneros married Vicenta Madera of Juarez in 1939, and together they had five daughters. In 1948, he became a US citizen through naturalization. He was a devout Catholic and would often go to services daily at St. Joseph’s Catholic Church in El Paso, up until his death.

== Exhibitions ==
- 1949 – José Cisneros: Illustrations, Dallas Museum of Fine Arts, Dallas, Texas
- 2018 – Early West Texas: Waypoint and Home, El Paso Museum of Art, El Paso, Texas

== Awards and honors ==
- An individual award for best illustration by a Texas artist for his illustrations in book “The Journey of Fray Marcos de Niza”, from the Texas Institute of Letters
- 1969 – Dobie Paisano Fellowship, from the University of Austin, Texas.
- 1974 – induction into the Hall of Honor, El Paso County Historical Society
- 1979 – Americanism Award, from the Daughters of the Revolution
- 1985 – Outstanding Western Book Award for illustrations in book “Riders Across the Centuries", from the National Cowboy Hall of Fame, Oklahoma City, Oklahoma
- 1990 – Knighted by Pope John Paul II in the Equestrian Order of the Holy Sepulchre of Jerusalem
- 1991 – Knighted by King Juan Carlos of Spain
- 2001 – National Humanities Medal, United States, presented by President George W. Bush
- 2007 – Ohtli Award, Institute of Mexicans Abroad (Instituto de los Mexicanos en el Exterior), Government of Mexico

== Bibliography ==
This is a list of publications authored by Cisneros or featuring Cisneros' illustrations.

- DeGolyer, Everette (1947). Across Aboriginal America: The Journey of Three Englishmen Across Texas in 1568. Illustrations by Jose Cisneros. Peripatetic Press. ASIN B0012KSUSG.
- Neville, Alexander White (1948). The Red River Valley, Then and Now. Illustrations by Jose Cisneros (1st ed.). North Texas Publishing Company. ASIN B0007ECK1G.
- Hallenbeck, Cleve (1949). The Journey of Fray Marcos de Niza. Illustrations by Jose Cisneros. University Press in Dallas. ASIN B002S65JUU.
- Cisneros, Jose (1981). Riders of the Borderlands (Limited ed.). University of Texas Press. ASIN B003S9IBK6.
- John O., West (1984). Riders Across the Centuries: Horsemen of the Spanish Borderlands. Illustrated by Jose Cisneros. Texas Western Press. ISBN 0874040892.
