= Walter Prescott Webb =

American historian (1888–1963)

- Born: April 3, 1888; Panola County, Texas
- Died: March 8, 1963 (aged 74); Austin, Texas
- Relatives: William J. Oliphant (father-in-law)
- Awards: Loubat Prize (1933)

Academic background
- Education: University of Texas
- Influences: Eugene C. Barker

Academic work
- Discipline: History
- Sub-discipline: American
- Institutions: University of Texas
- Doctoral students: W. Turrentine Jackson
- Notable students: Llerena Friend
- Main interests: Non-fiction, history, Texana, American West
- Notable works: The Great Plains, The Handbook of Texas

Walter Prescott Webb (April 3, 1888, in Panola County, Texas – March 8, 1963, near Austin, Texas) was an American historian noted for his groundbreaking work on the American West. As president of the Texas State Historical Association, he launched the project that produced the Handbook of Texas. He is a member of the Hall of Great Westerners, which is a part of the National Cowboy & Western Heritage Museum.

== Early life ==
Walter Prescott Webb was born on April 3, 1888, in rural Panola County, Texas, to Casner P. and Elizabeth (Kyle) Webb. His father worked a farm part-time while teaching school. When Webb was a teenager, the family moved west to the arid western Cross Timbers region traversing Stephens County and Eastland County, Texas. He helped with the family farming business and attended Ranger High School.

The Webbs moved frequently to different tenant farms within the region. According to Webb, these experiences at the edge of the western plains of Texas influenced his early writing. Casner started by accepting teaching assignments and farm leases in Stephens County, but first moved to adjacent Eastland County 1898. Webb enrolled at various rural schools and was certified as a teacher in 1907.

Webb started attending the University of Texas at Austin in the fall of 1909. In 1913, Webb graduated with a baccalaureate degree. Over the next few years, he taught at three high schools and at the Texas State Teachers College.

What I wanted to be was a writer, and I wanted to write, not for the few but for the many, never for the specialist who doesn’t read much anyway. I wanted to write so that people could understand me; I wanted to persuade them, lure them along from sentence to paragraph, make them see patterns of truth in the kaleidoscope of the past, exercise upon them the marvelous magic of words as conveyors of thought.

== Career ==
Webb worked as a bookkeeper in San Marcos and as an optometrist's assistant in San Antonio. Then, in 1918, he was invited to join the history faculty at the University of Texas. He wrote his Master of Arts thesis on the Texas Rangers in 1920 and was encouraged to pursue his PhD. After a year of study at the University of Chicago, he returned to Austin, where he began a historical work on the West. The result of this work was The Great Plains, published in 1931, hailed as great breakthrough in the interpretation of the history of the region, and declared the outstanding contribution to American history since World War I by the Social Science Research Council in 1939. He was awarded his PhD for his work on The Great Plains in 1932, the year after its publication. The Texas Rangers (1935) was considered the definitive study of the legendary Texas Rangers and its Captain Bill McDonald.

Webb published Divided We Stand: The Crisis of a Frontierless Democracy in 1937. In the following years, Webb accepted two teaching positions in England. The University of London appointed him as the Harkness Professor of American History. After the United States dispatched troops to Europe, Webb moved to Oxford to accept a chair at the university as its Harmsworth Professor of American History.

In 1939–1946 he served as president of the Texas State Historical Association. During his tenure as president, he launched a project to produce an encyclopedia of Texas, which was subsequently published in 1952 as the Handbook of Texas.

After returning from England in 1944, Webb joined in a political dispute, which pitted several University of Texas faculty against the University of Texas Board of Regents. The board fired some economics professors for their support of New Deal policies. The sitting University of Texas president, Homer P. Raimey, defended the fired professors on the grounds of economic freedom. In response, the board fired Raimey. Webb was a spokesperson for the faculty opposed to the new president, T.S. Painter. One result of this advocacy was a strain of Webb's relationship with the former chair of the history department, Eugene C. Barker, who had also influenced Webb as a historian.

Webb served as president of the Mississippi Historical Association and the American Historical Association. He was a co-founder of the Texas Institute of Letters and a member of the Philosophical Society of Texas.

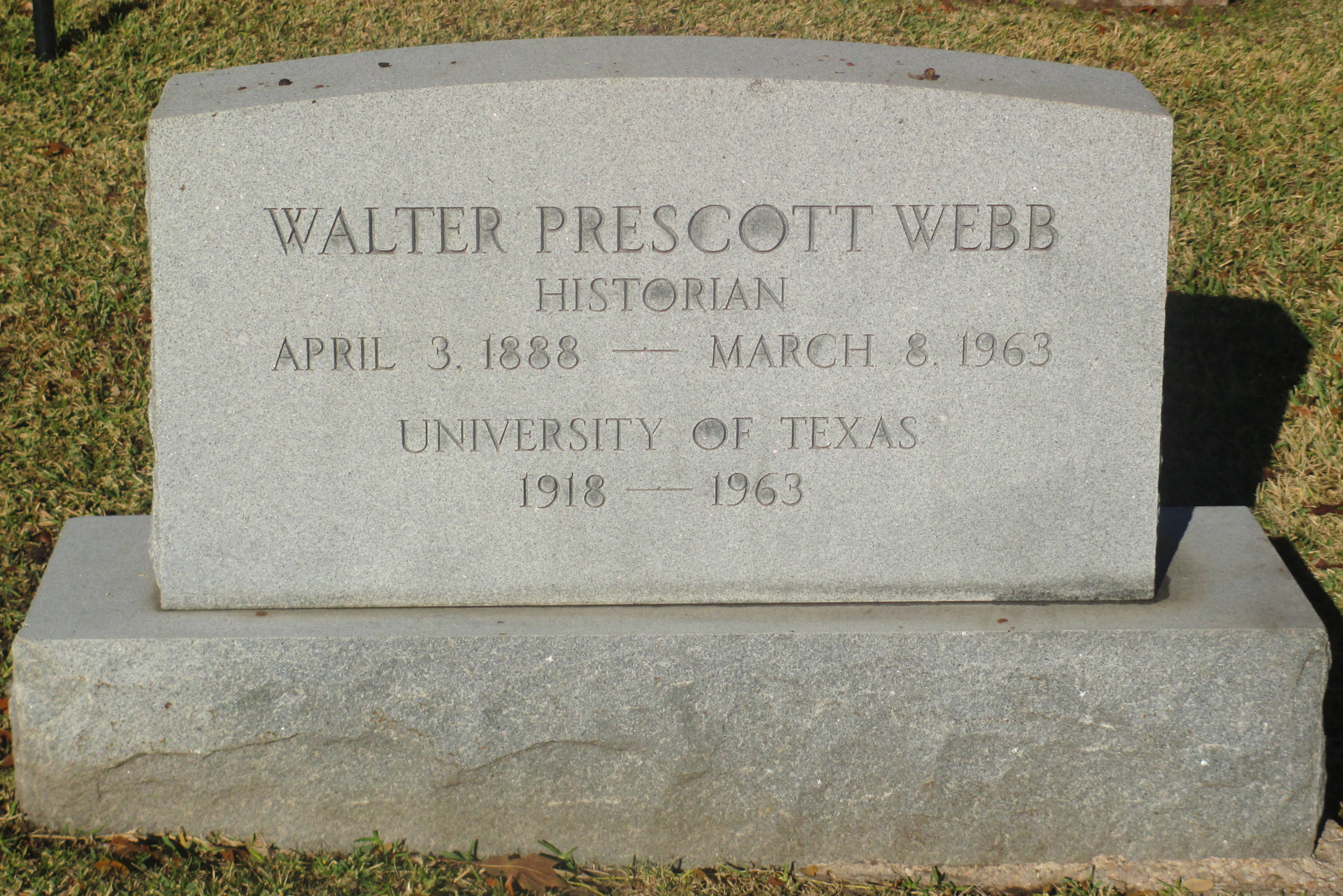
Walter Prescott Webb grave at Texas State Cemetery in Austin, Texas

== Personal life ==
Webb married Jane Elizabeth Oliphant of Austin on September 16, 1916. Their only child, Mildred Alice Webb, was born on July 30, 1918. Webb's father-in-law was the Confederate States Army veteran and Austin, Texas-based photographer, William J. Oliphant (1845–1930). Walter and Jane remained married until her death in 1960.

Webb purchased a 360-acre tract in Hays County, Texas, not far from Austin. He rehabilitated an old stone house which was located near a topological feature, and called his second home, "Friday Mountain Ranch." Webb hosted many get togethers at his ranch, attracting Texas literatis such as Frank Wardlaw, John Henry Faulk, Roy Bedichek, Mody Boatright, and J. Frank Dobie.

In 1961, Webb met Terrell Louise Dobbs Maverick (1901–1994), the widow of Maury Maverick, a former Mayor of San Antonio and Congressman. They married on December 14, 1961, in Fredericksburg, Texas.

== Death and legacy ==
In March 1963, Webb died at the age of 74 in an automobile crash near Buda, Texas. He was driving, and the passenger, his wife Terrell Maverick, suffered serious injuries, but survived. Webb was the editor of Maverick's memoir, and the two were on the road promoting her book.

Governor John B. Connally, Jr. issued a proclamation for Webb to be interred at the Texas State Cemetery in Austin. Zilker Park in Austin is the site of a statue of Webb with statues of fellow Texas writers, J. Frank Dobie and Roy Bedichek.

In his honor the University of Texas established the Walter Prescott Webb Chair of History and Ideas. Philippa Levine held this chair starting in 2017. Webb Middle School in Austin, Texas is also named after him.

Webb is also noted for his early criticism of the water usage patterns in the region. In 2012, he was inducted into the Hall of Great Westerners of the National Cowboy & Western Heritage Museum.

== Ideas ==
Rundell (1963) has examined Webb's main books to see what inspired and prompted the writing of each, what the purpose and message of each seems to be, and Webb's emergent philosophy of history. The professional reception of these studies was also considered. The message of The Great Plains (1931) is contained in its subtitle 'A Study in Institutions and Environment.' Its primary purpose was to present representative ideas about the region rather than to write its history. Webb called the settled area of Europe 'the Metropolis' and the rest of the world 'the Great Frontier', claiming that "the Great Plains environment... constitutes a geographic unity whose influences have been so powerful as to put a characteristic mark upon everything that survives within its borders", pointing to the revolver, barbed wire, and the windmill as essential to its settlement. He claims that the 98th meridian constitutes an "institutional fault", with "practically every institution that was carried across it... either broken and remade or else greatly altered". The book was hailed as one of the top contributions to Am. history since World War I by the Social Science Research Council in 1939.

Webb's The Texas Rangers (1935) was a pungent and learned treatment of a frontier institution, but is regarded by many modern historians as an apologia for border violence perpetuated by Rangers against Mexican-Americans. The economic domination of the North, through the tariff, Civil War pensions, and patent monopolies, and the development of the centralized economy dominated by 200 major corporations (over the South and West, which contained the largest share of natural resources) was the theme of Divided We Stand (1937).

More Water for Texas (1954) popularized and vitalized a federal study of what he regarded as the most serious problem of his state. The Webb thesis focused on the fragility of the Western environment, pointing out the aridity of the territory and the dangers of an industrialized West.

In 1951 Webb published The Great Frontier, proposing the Boom Hypothesis, that the new lands discovered by Christopher Columbus in 1492 ran out by 1900, closing the frontier and giving the U.S. economic and ecological problems, threatening the future of individualism, capitalism, and democracy.

In a 2006 Technology and Culture review of The Great Frontier, George O'Har shows that in Webb's classic interdisciplinary history of the post-Civil War West, he develops dominant characteristics of the Great Plains – treelessness, level terrain, and semiaridity – and examines effect on the lives of people from very different environments. To succeed, pioneers made radical readjustments in their way of life, eschewed traditions, and altered social institutions. O'Har notes that Webb believed what set the Great Plains apart from other regions was its individualism, innovation, democracy, and lawlessness, thus putting him into the school of Frederick Jackson Turner's Frontier Thesis. His focus is said to have missed the emergence of a national empire, and others criticize him for failing to acknowledge the roles played by women, Indians, and Mexicans.

=== Water ===
Drought in 1953 provoked water as a new interest for Webb. He derived much of the material in More Water for Texas: The Problem and the Plan from a US Senate report from December 1952 titled, Water Supply and Texas Economy: An Appraisal of the Texas Water Problem.

Webb was an esteemed historian when he wrote an article in the May 1957 edition of Harper's entitled "The American West, Perpetual Mirage". In the article, Webb criticized U.S. water policy in the West, stating that the region was "a semidesert with a desert heart", and that it was a national folly to continue to follow the current federal policy (managed through the United States Bureau of Reclamation) of attempting to convert the region into productive cropland through irrigation. Webb's criticism of federal policy was roundly rebuked at the time, but some contemporary critics of U.S. water policy regard him as prophetic in his views.

== Media ==
- A one-act play by Steve Moore, Nightswim, about Roy Bedichek, J. Frank Dobie and Walter Prescott Webb was first produced in Austin in the fall of 2004. Their friendship is narrated in the book Three Friends: Roy Bedichek, J. Frank Dobie, Walter Prescott, Webb by William A. Owens, published in 1969.

== Works ==
- The Great Plains: A Study in Institutions and Environment (1931) read online
- The Texas Rangers: A Century of Frontier Defense (1935) read online
- Divided We Stand: The Crisis of a Frontierless Democracy (1937) read online
- The Great Frontier (1951) read online
- More Water for Texas: The Problem and the Plan (Austin: U. of Texas Press, 1954) read online
- An Honest Preface and Other Essays (1959) read online

== Quotes ==
The writing of a book is an act of resolution. At some stage the author must say: “No more research. I will not be lured away by new material. I will write this damned thing now.”

If an idea or interpretation cannot survive a critic, any critic, it is no good anyway. If the idea is sound, then the criticism advertises and spreads it.

== See also ==
- Eugene C. Barker
- Great Plains
- Ernest Wallace
- Robert W. Mondy

== Bibliography ==
- Collins, Michael L. (2013). "Walter Prescott Webb". In Cox, Patrick L.; Hendrickson, Kenneth E. Jr. (eds.). Writing the Story of Texas. University of Texas Press. ISBN 978-0-292-74875-0.
