= William J. Oliphant =

American photographer (1845–1930)

William James Oliphant
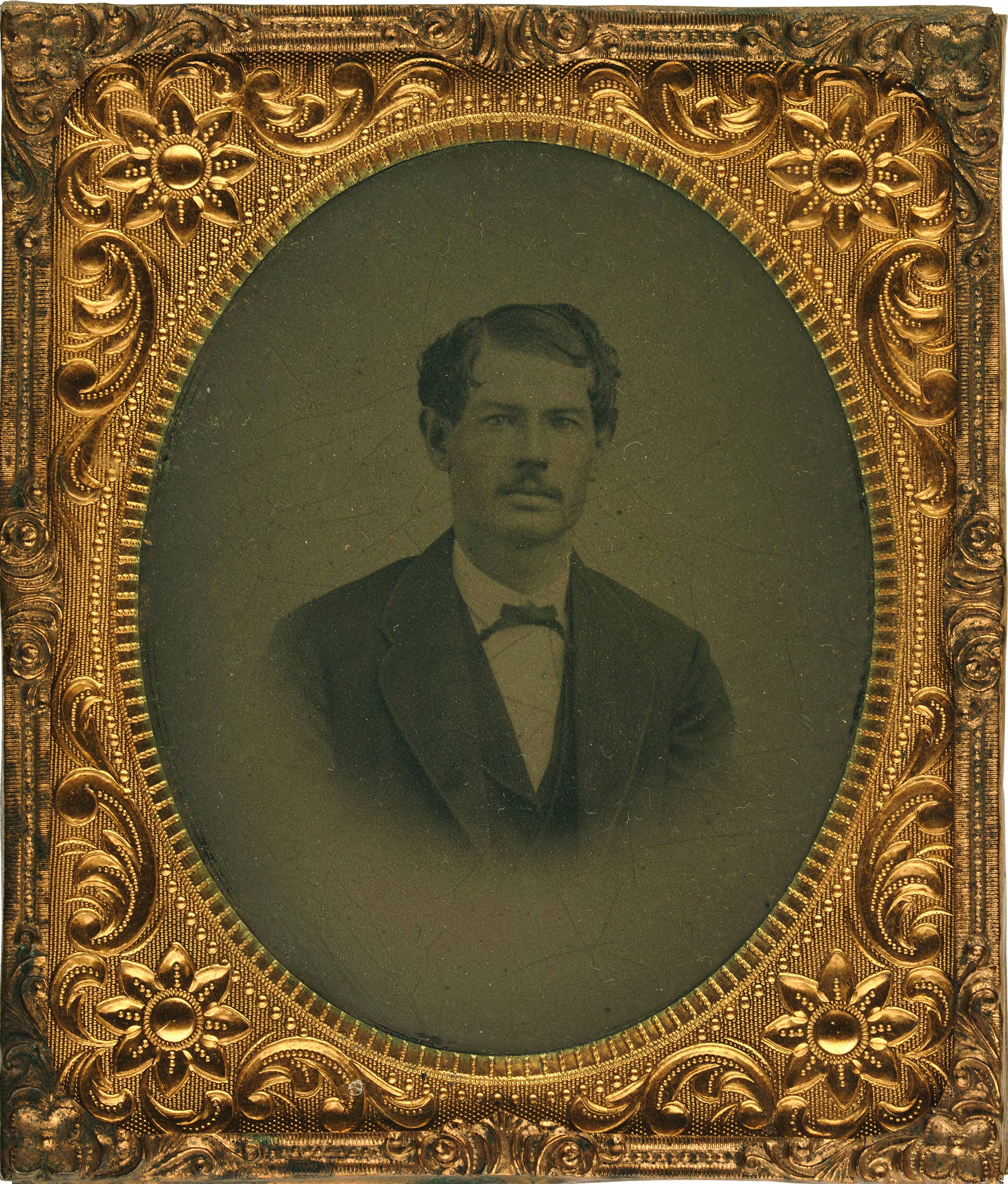
- Born: September 30, 1845; Lawrenceburg, Indiana, U.S.
- Died: November 11, 1930 (aged 85); Austin, Texas, U.S.
- Occupations: Army private, photographer, photography publisher
- Spouse(s): Lizzie J. (Walker); Alice Olive Townsend
- Relatives: Walter Prescott Webb (son-in-law)

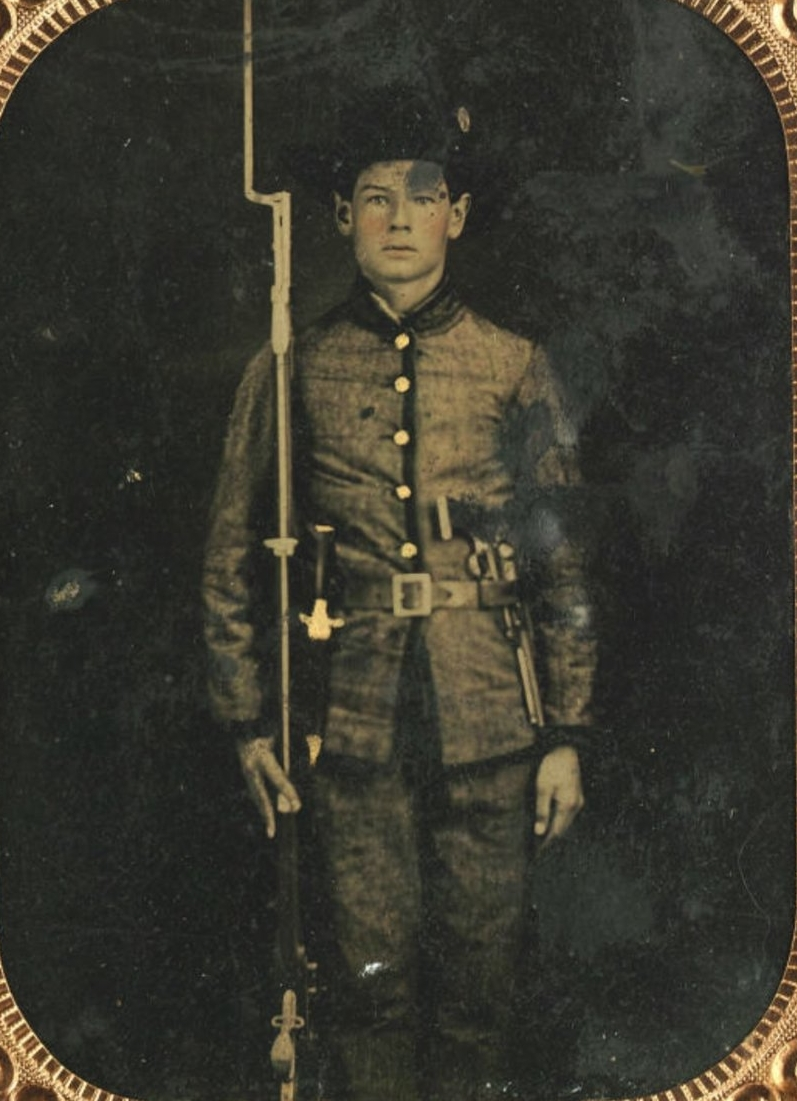
Pvt. William J. Oliphant, Co. G, 6th Texas Infantry Regiment.

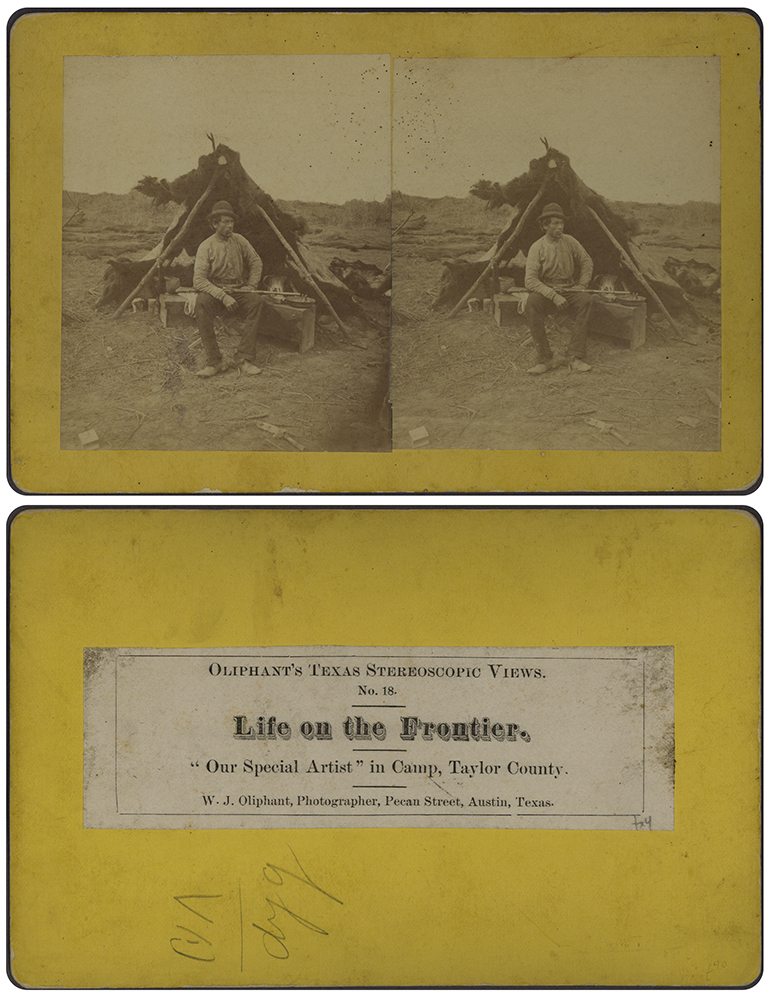
Oliphant's Texas Stereoscopic Views

William J. Oliphant (1845–1930) was an American Confederate States Army veteran and photographer from Austin, Texas. He published the first photographs of buffalo hunts in North America.

== Early life ==
William James Oliphant was born on September 30, 1845, in Lawrenceburg, Indiana. His father, William S. Oliphant (1813–1890), was a jeweler. His mother was Jane (Van Zile) Oliphant (1822–1867). He moved to Texas with his parents in 1853. The family settled in Austin, where his father's jewelry store was located on Pecan Street, now known as Sixth Street.

He studied photography under Alexander Gardner (1845–1930) and Timothy H. O'Sullivan (1840–1882) in Washington, D.C.

== Career ==
During the American Civil War of 1861–1865, Oliphant served as a private in the Company G of the Sixth Texas Infantry Regiment, also known as the "Travis Rifles", of the Confederate States Army (CSA). He served in the Battle of Missionary Ridge, the Battle of Pickett's Mill, and the Battle of Atlanta, where he was wounded and caught by Union forces. He was in prison at Camp Chase for nearly a year, from July 1864 to March 1865.

Shortly after the war, Oliphant became a photographer in Austin. His studio was above his father's jewelry shop at 117 Pecan Street. Indeed, together with Hamilton B. Hillyer (1835–1903), he was one of the earliest photographers in Austin to have a studio in the city. Additionally, he published photographs taken by other photographers. He is perhaps best known for publishing the earliest photographs of buffalo hunts in the United States. They are known as the Life on the Frontier series, taken by George Robertson in 1874.

From the 1880s to the 1920s, Oliphant worked for the government. He worked for the Texas Comptroller of Public Accounts from 1881 to 1886, the Internal Revenue Service from 1887 to 1890, and for the Travis County Tax Assessor's Office from 1905 to 1927.

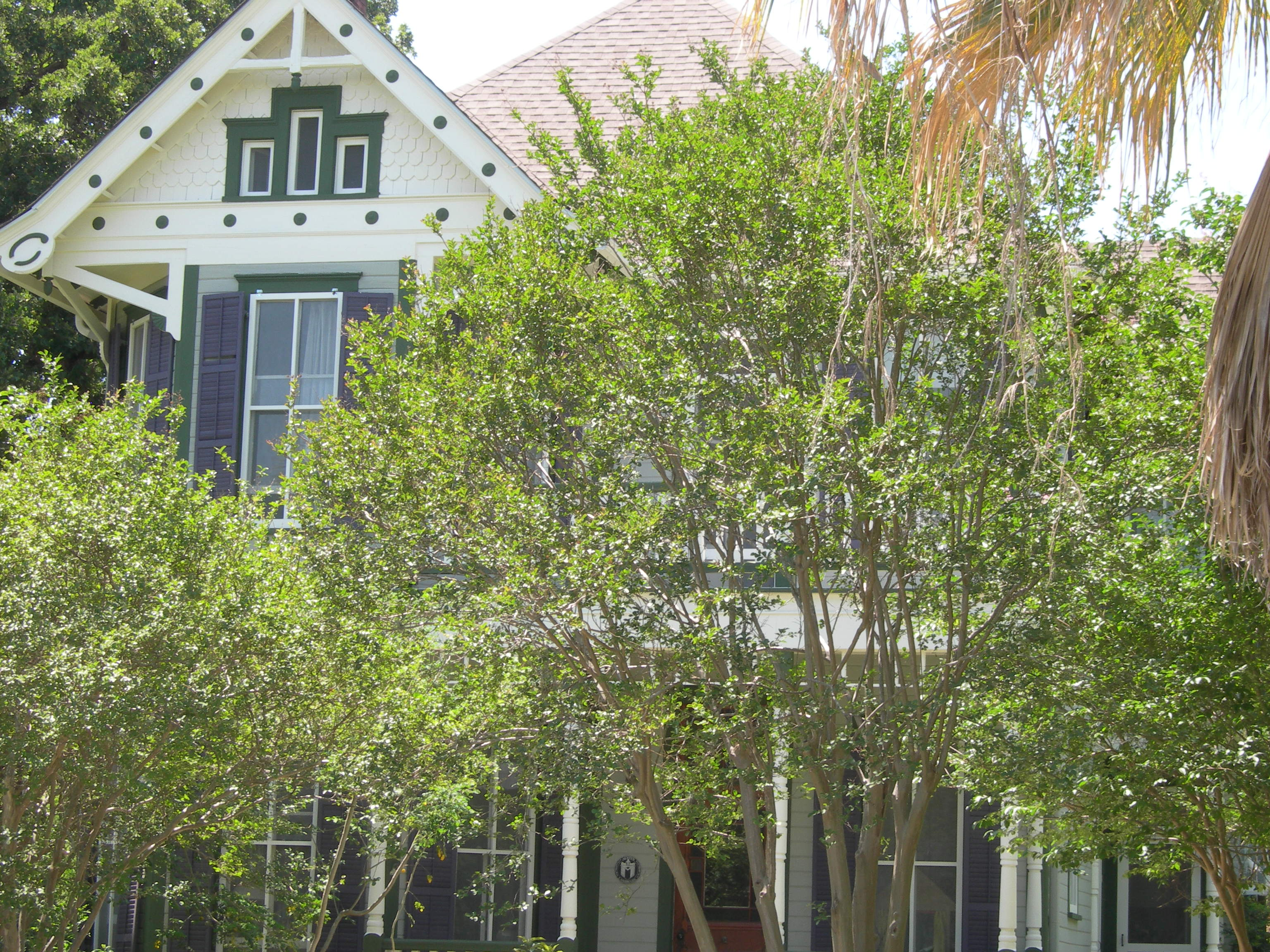
The Oliphant-Walker House in Austin, Texas, where William J. Oliphant resided.

== Personal life ==
Oliphant resided at the Oliphant-Walker House in Hyde Park, a suburb of Austin. He married twice. His first wife was Lizzie J. Walker (1848–1873). After she died in 1873, he married Alice Olive Townsend (1852–1908) in 1877. They had four children. One of his daughters married Walter Prescott Webb, a Texas historian.

James Oliphant, a journalist with Reuters News in Washington, is William J. Oliphant's direct descendant.

== Death and legacy ==
Oliphant died on November 11, 1930, in Austin, Texas. He was buried at the Oakwood Cemetery in Austin, Texas.

The William J. Oliphant chapter of the United Daughters of the Confederacy in Austin, Texas is named in his honor.

== Bibliography ==
- Oliphant, William J. Only a Private: A Texan Remembers the Civil War. Edited by James M. McCaffrey. Houston, Texas: Halcyon Press, Ltd. 2004.
