= The Wonderful Country (film) =

1959 film by Robert Parrish

- Directed by: Robert Parrish
- Written by: Walter Bernstein (uncredited)
- Screenplay by: Robert Ardrey
- Based on: The Wonderful Country; 1952 novel by Tom Lea
- Produced by: Chester Erskine
- Starring: Robert Mitchum; Julie London; Pedro Armendáriz
- Cinematography: Floyd Crosby; Alex Phillips
- Edited by: Michael Luciano
- Music by: Alex North
- Production company: D.R.M. Productions
- Distributed by: United Artists
- Release date: October 21, 1959
- Running time: 98 minutes
- Countries: United States (production); Mexico (filming)
- Language: English
- Box office: $1 million (US/Canada rentals)

The Wonderful Country is a 1959 American Technicolor Western film based (with substantial changes) on Tom Lea's 1952 novel of the same name that was produced by Robert Mitchum's DRM Production company in Mexico. Mitchum stars along with Julie London.

Baseball pitcher Satchel Paige plays a soldier in the film, and Lea has a cameo as a barber.

== Plot ==
In Mexico, expatriate American pistolero Martin Brady is employed by the Castro brothers, Marcos (Víctor Manuel Mendoza), a general, and Don Cipriano (Pedro Armendáriz), the new governor. On a business trip to the United States to arrange the purchase of a wagonload of rifles and ammunition, he is delayed when he breaks his leg in an accident in the Texas border town of Puerto. Treated by Dr Stovall (Charles McGraw), he stays with German immigrant Ben Sterner (John Banner), who is the seller of the rifles, and Ben's nephew Ludwig (Chico) (Max Slaten).

Brady's help is sought by the local U.S. Army commander, Major Colton (Gary Merrill), to persuade Cipriano Castro to cooperate with Colton's Buffalo Soldiers in an expedition against hostile Apaches in Mexico. In the meantime the rifles Brady purchased for Castro have been stolen. Captain Rucker of the Texas Rangers knows Brady fled to Mexico as an adolescent after avenging the murder of his father, not knowing the man he killed was an outlaw. Rucker tries to enlist Brady as a Ranger. Brady is attracted to Colton's unhappy wife Helen (Julie London). Brady shoots a man named Barton (Chuck Roberson) who murdered Ludwig and drew on him. He then returns to Mexico to inform Cipriano Castro of the missing rifles.

Major Colton and Helen arrive to meet with Cipriano, arranged by Travis Hight (Jack Oakie), the representative of a railroad threatened by the Apaches. Helen and Brady have a brief affair. Cipriano tells Brady that, by law, he must pay a debt for the rifles and orders him to assassinate his brother Marcos, who seeks to make himself governor. Brady refuses and finds himself an outlaw in Mexico as well. Weeks later on the run, he finds cavalry sergeant Tobe Sutton (Satchel Paige) and returns with him to Major Colton's camp.

Colton has been seriously wounded in a skirmish with the Apaches but is determined to rendezvous with Captain Rucker and General Castro's troops. En route they recover the stolen rifles from a small band of Apaches, but Colton dies. The rifles are returned to General Marcos, who reveals that Cipriano is also dead and he is now governor. Calling Brady an assassin, he demands the Americans surrender him and leave Mexico immediately. Rucker offers to help Brady prove that the shooting in Puerto was a case of self-defense, if he will return to Texas. Brady decides to risk it and heads towards the Rio Grande to be with Helen. Near the river he is ambushed by a gunfighter frequently seen with Marcos. Brady kills him but his Andalusian stallion, a constant companion throughout the story, is killed. Brady leaves his gun, bullets and sombrero by the horse and walks towards the U.S.

== Cast ==
- Robert Mitchum as Martin Brady
- Julie London as Helen Colton
- Gary Merrill as Maj. Stark Colton
- Pedro Armendáriz as Don Cipriano
- Albert Dekker as Texas Ranger Capt. Rucker
- Jack Oakie as Travis Hight
- Charles McGraw as Dr. Herbert J. Stovall
- Satchel Paige as Sgt. Tobe Sutton
- Anthony Caruso as Santiago Santos
- Mike Kellin as Pancho Gil
- Víctor Manuel Mendoza as Gen. Marcos Castro
- Jay Novello as Diego Casas
- John Banner as Ben Sterner
- Max Slaten as Ludwig 'Chico' Sterner
- Chuck Roberson as Barton

== Production ==
Robert Parrish went to Tom Lea and asked if he [Parrish] could direct it. The only money that Lea received from the picture was for his role as the barber.

The motion picture was filmed in the state of Durango. Parrish and Lea first asked Henry Fonda, then Gregory Peck to take the starring role. After Fonda and Peck declined, Mitchum, who was eager to do the film, took the lead.

During filming in Durango, Mitchum and his stunt double Chuck Roberson decided to have a few drinks at a local cantina. They witnessed two Mexicans get into a violent confrontation in which one drew a pistol and fired a shot into the other's face. After running outside momentarily, the wounded man came back into the bar and dropped dead. The incident shook up Mitchum so badly it convinced him to keep his drinking to the hotel and its vicinity.

== Reception ==
The film was not well received at the box office and by some critics, but other critics considered it beautifully filmed by cinematographers Floyd Crosby and Alex Phillips.

A rave review in The New York Times appeared on November 5, 1959, with critic Howard Thompson referring to Mitchum as "ideally cast" and writing: "This is a superior, intelligent film on nearly every count ... beautifully paced by Robert Parrish's direction and magnificently evocative of the locale where it was made, this Chester Erskine production is consistently rewarding."

Upon its release, TIME said about it: "But the result is just a crying Shane. All that is truly dramatic is the wonderful country itself" and about Mitchum's performance: "...he sounds like an Aztec exchange student after six terms at C.C.N.Y.". "The rest of the plot is as snarled as a ball of tumbleweed." and; "...a western that is more woolly than wild".

Upon its 1961 release in Cuba, it set off an ideological fury due to "two Mexican bandits who were named the Castro brothers".

As Roger Fristoe notes, recent critics regard the film more highly than critics writing more than fifty years ago. Dennis Schwartz wrote in 2019 that the film is "A wonderfully rich western that ambitiously covers many familiar themes and does a good job in developing the main character and his knotty personality."
