= Thousand-yard stare =

Dissociative gaze

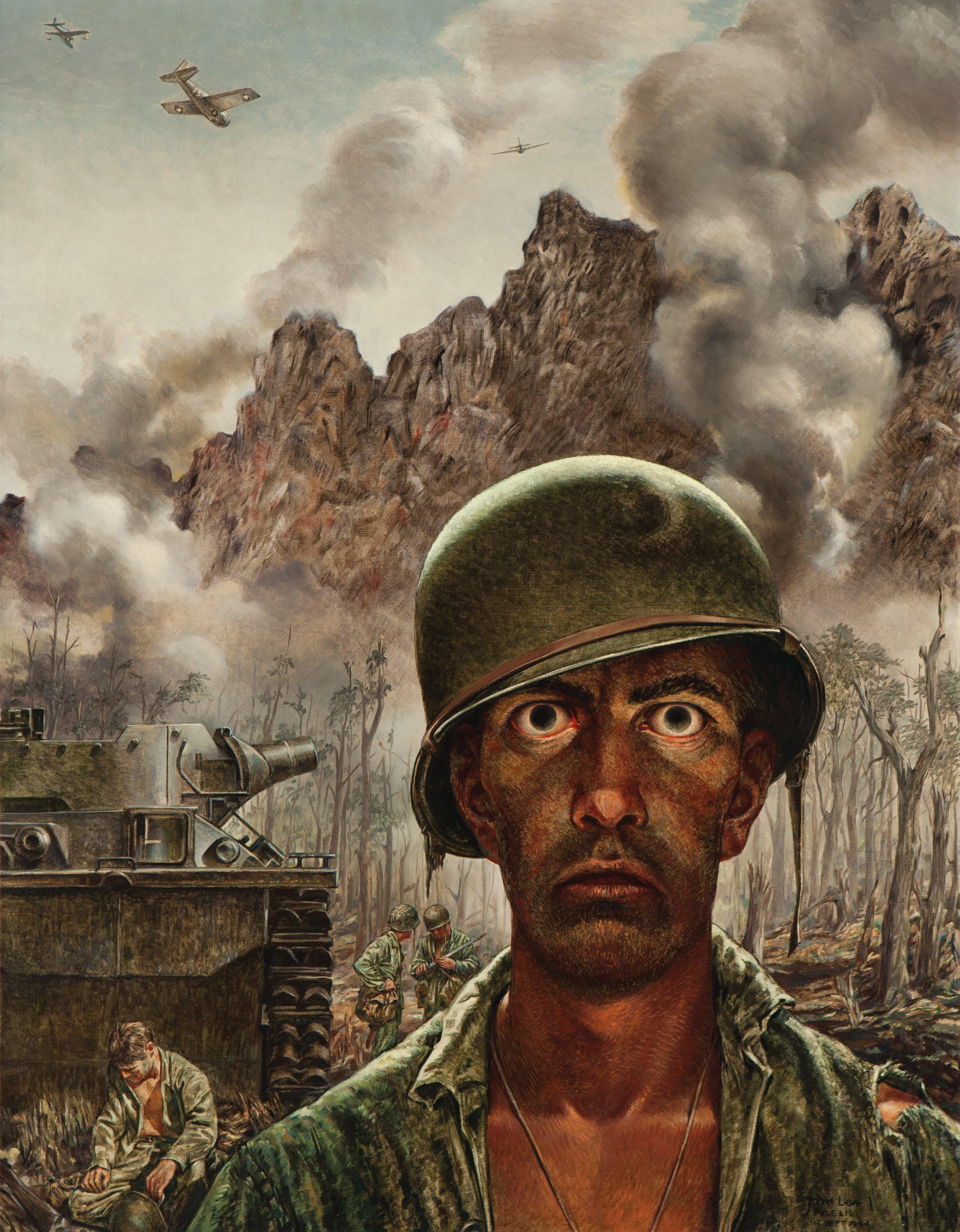
War artist Thomas C. Lea III's The Two-Thousand Yard Stare

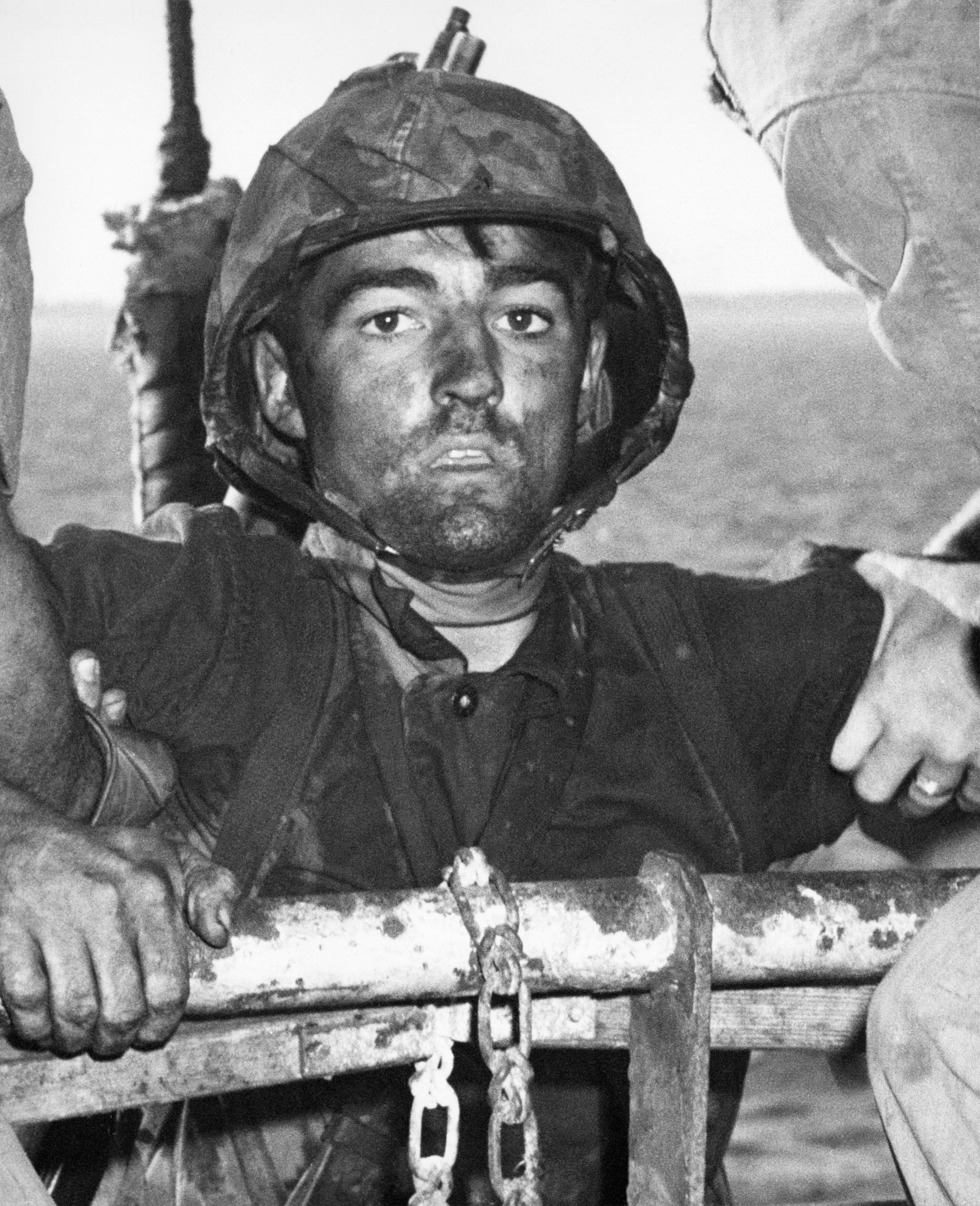
An exhausted U.S. Marine, Private Theodore J. Miller, exhibits the thousand-yard stare after two days of combat at the Battle of Eniwetok, February 1944. Miller would later be killed in action on Ebon Atoll a month later.

The thousand-yard stare (also referred to as the two-thousand-yard stare) is a blank, unfocused gaze of people experiencing dissociation due to acute stress or traumatic events. The phrase was originally used to describe war combatants and the post-traumatic stress disorder (PTSD) they exhibited but is now also used to refer to an unfocused gaze seen in people under a stressful situation, or in people with certain mental health conditions.

The thousand-yard stare is often associated with shell shock, combat stress reaction, and other trauma-related mental health conditions.

== Origin ==
The phrase was popularized after Life magazine published the painting Marines Call It That 2,000 Yard Stare by World War II artist and correspondent Tom Lea, although the painting was not referred to with that title in the 1945 magazine article. The painting, a 1944 portrait of a nameless Marine at the Battle of Peleliu, is now held by the United States Army Center of Military History in Fort Lesley J. McNair, Washington, D.C. About the real-life Marine who was his subject, Lea wrote:

Last evening he came down out of the hills. Told to get some sleep, he found a shell crater and slumped into it. He's awake now. First light has given his gray face eerie color. He left the States 31 months ago. He was wounded in his first campaign. He has had tropical diseases. There is no food or water in the hills except what you carry. He half-sleeps at night and gouges Japs out of holes all day. Two thirds of his company has been killed or wounded but he is still standing. So he will return to attack this morning. How much can a human being endure?

When recounting his arrival in Vietnam in 1965, then-Corporal Joe Houle (director of the Marine Corps Museum of the Carolinas in 2002) said he saw no emotion in the eyes of his new squad: "The look in their eyes was like the life was sucked out of them". He later learned that the term for their condition was "the 1,000-yard stare". "After I lost my first friend, I felt it was best to be detached", he explained.

== See also ==
- Catatonia – psychiatric behavioral syndrome
- Defence mechanism – unconscious psychological mechanism
- Flashback (psychology) – psychological phenomenon in which a person re-experiences a memory
- Hypervigilance – nervous system condition
- James Blake Miller – United States Marine
