= The Wonderful Country =

1952 novel by Tom Lea

- First edition
- Author: Tom Lea
- Illustrator: Tom Lea
- Subject: Mexican-American Border Region; Fugitives from justice
- Genre: Western; Southwestern
- Publisher: Little, Brown and Company (Boston)
- Publication date: 1952
- Pages: 307
- ISBN: 978-0-87565-261-0 (2002 reprint)
- OCLC: 288704
- Dewey Decimal: 813/.54 21
- LC Class: PS3523.E1142 W6 2002
- Preceded by: The Brave Bulls
- Followed by: The Primal Yoke

The Wonderful Country (aka The Wonderful Country, A Novel) is a 1952 Western novel written by Tom Lea. The book is set in Chihuahua and Sonora, Mexico, and Texas and New Mexico in the United States. It was filmed in 1959.

After the financial success of The Brave Bulls, Lea wanted to write a story that he had been thinking about since he was a child: "...write about this borderland and about the people on both sides of the river".

== Plot ==
Martin Brady, at age 14, flees to Mexico from Texas after he kills the man who murdered his father. Now, 14 years later, in 1880s Mexico, he is called Martin Bredi. He is a hired gun for a rich Mexican rancher and Chihuahuan warlord, Cipriano Castro. Brady starts to feel like he would like to return to Texas. Castro send him north to Puerto, Texas, to guard a load of silver ore, with the intention of smuggling arms.

When he gets to Texas he breaks his leg and has to stay put in the town while he heals. He is approached by the head of the Texas Rangers division in Puerto about joining after the Captain confirms his identity and lets Brady know that he will not be prosecuted for killing his father's murderer. He also is enamored by the ranger captain's daughter, Louisa Rucker.

After killing a man who injured a friend, he returns to Mexico and is sent on an impossible errand to deliver a load of gunpowder by General Marco Castro, the brother of Cipriano. The wagon blows up before it is delivered. After returning to Chihuahua, Cipriano Castro sends Brady to assassinate a rival Salcido; however, the Castros are suspicious of him and have him followed. During his sojourn in Chihuahua, he meets an acquaintance from Puerto and learns that the man he killed was a criminal with a reward for his death.

Wanted in the United States and now distrusted in Mexico, he makes his way back to Texas and on the way assists a lost column of Buffalo soldiers that is deep into Mexico fighting Apache Indians. Back in Texas, Brady joins the Texas Rangers, as part of a deal for his being a wanted man, and helps them fight the Apaches back in Mexico.

A crucial character to the story is Brady's horse, a black Andalusian stallion named Lágrimas ("tears").

== Reception ==
In TIME's review, the magazine called it "...an honest book written with obvious care and even reserved passion..." The review added: "Neither Brady nor anyone else in the book is a successfully developed character, but with all its weaknesses 'The Wonderful Country' is still a western plus. What is extra comes in author Lea's fine descriptive writing, a love for the West that is conveyed with grace and dignity, an authentic sense of place."

Lou Rodenberge, of McMurry College, said that the novel is: "...the best to date of all fiction created from materials of border life", from "The Southern Border" in A Literary History of the American West.

"One of the finest of all Southwest novels by a Southwesterner, whose power with pencil and paint is perfectly matched by his way with words," said Lawrence Clark Powell.

== Adaptation ==
It was made into a 1959 film with the same title, starring Robert Mitchum (also executive producer with his company, D.R.M. Productions, producing) and Julie London, directed by Robert Parrish. Robert Ardrey adapted the book to the screenplay. Lea also has a bit part as Mr. Peebles (the barber). Satchel Paige has a cameo role as the leader of an African-American unit of the U.S. Cavalry, the Buffalo Soldiers. Parrish went to Lea and ask him if he [Parrish] could direct it. The only money that Lea received from the picture was for his role as the barber.
