= William Turrentine Jackson =

American professor of history

W. Turrentine "Turpie" Jackson (1915, Ruston, Louisiana – May 28, 2000) was an American professor of history, specializing in Western U.S. history.

== Biography ==
Jackson grew up in El Paso, Texas. He graduated in 1935 with B.A. from Texas Western College (now the University of Texas at El Paso) and in 1940 with Ph.D. from the University of Texas at Austin, where his thesis advisor was Walter Prescott Webb. Jackson taught at UCLA, Iowa State University, the University of Chicago, the University of Glasgow, and four other universities and also served in the intelligence division of the U. S. Navy, before he joined in 1951 the faculty of the history department of the University of California, Davis. He taught there until he began phased retirement in 1982 with full retirement in 1985.

Jackson's research covered policy history and social history. He debunked the stereotype of rugged individualism and small property owners in the Old West with evidence for development involving U.S. government surveys, U.S. federal subsidies, and international capital. He published extensively and served on the editorial boards of several academic journals. Three of his books won prizes.

Wells Fargo hired Jackson as a consultant and corporate historian.

As a consulting historian to the company for 20 years, he had 13 monographs and articles on the company’s history in the Western states published in scholarly journals. Taking on other projects for law firms, environmental consultants and government agencies, he became a partner in JRP Historical Consulting Services in Davis. He retired from the company in 1990.

With his wife, Barbara, he endowed an undergraduate history scholarship, and both a graduate fellowship and a faculty chair in the history of the American West. The Jacksons were also major benefactors to the Western History Association and the Pacific Coast Branch of the American Historical Association, both of which have named major scholarly awards in Turpie's honor.

== Awards and honors ==
- 1957 — Guggenheim Fellowship for the academic year 1957–1958
- 1964 — Guggenheim Fellowship for the academic year 1964–1965
- 1977 — elected president of the Western History Association

== Selected publications ==
=== Articles ===
- Jackson, W. Turrentine (1942). "The Creation of Yellowstone National Park". The Mississippi Valley Historical Review. 29 (2): 187–206. doi:10.2307/1896270. JSTOR 1896270.
- —— (1948). "The Wyoming Stock Growers' Association: Its Years of Temporary Decline, 1886-1890". Agricultural History. 22 (4): 260–270. JSTOR 3739523.
- —— (1949). "Federal Road Building Grants for Early Oregon". Oregon Historical Quarterly. 50 (1): 3–29. JSTOR 20611894.
- —— (1955). "The Infamous Emma Mine: A British Interest in the Little Cottonwood District, Utah Territory". Utah Historical Quarterly. 23 (4): 339–362. doi:10.2307/45057846. JSTOR 45057846. S2CID 254440133.
- —— (1963). "British Impact on the Utah Mining Industry". Utah Historical Quarterly. 31 (4): 347–375. doi:10.2307/45058368. JSTOR 45058368. S2CID 254443232.
- —— (1966). "A New Look at Wells Fargo, Stage-Coaches and the Pony Express". California History. 45 (4): 291–324. doi:10.2307/25154156. JSTOR 25154156.
- —— (1972). "Wells Fargo: Symbol of the Wild West?". The Western Historical Quarterly. 3 (2): 179–196. doi:10.2307/967112. JSTOR 967112.

=== Books ===
- Wagon Roads West. Berkeley: University of California Press. 1952. 1979 pbk reprint
- with Maurice Frink and Agnes Wright Spring: When Grass Was King. Boulder: University of Colorado Press. 1956.
- Treasure Hill: The Portrait of a Silver Mining Camp. Tucson: University of Arizona Press. 1963. 2016 ebook
- The Enterprising Scot: Investors in the American West after 1873. Edinburgh University Publications: History, Philosophy and Economics, no. 22. Edinburgh University Press. 1968.

== as editor ==
- Eno, Henry (1965). Twenty years on the Pacific Slope; letters of Henry Eno from California and Nevada, 1848-1871. Edited and with an introd. by W. Turrentine Jackson. New Haven: Yale University Press.
- Windeler, Adolphus (1969). California Gold Rush diary of a German sailor. Illustrated with pencil sketches by his inseparable partner Carl (Charley) Friderich Christendorff. Edited and with an introd. by W. Turrentine Jackson. Berkeley, California: Howell-North Books.
