= Roy Bedichek =

American folklorist and naturalist

- Born: June 27, 1878; Cass County, Illinois, U.S.
- Died: May 21, 1959 (aged 80); Texas, U.S.
- Education: University of Texas at Austin
- Occupations: Writer, naturalist, educator
- Spouse: Lillian Lee Greer Bedichek
- Children: Mary, Sarah & Bachman
- Writing career
- Language: English
- Period: 1946–1959 as writer
- Notable work: Adventures with a Texas Naturalist
- Notable awards: Outstanding Texas book of the year by TIL

Roy Bedichek (June 27, 1878 – May 21, 1959) was a Texan writer, naturalist, and educator. Born in Illinois, his family moved to Texas when he was a minor. He worked as a reporter, teacher, and chamber of commerce secretary.

== Biography ==
=== Early life and education ===
Roy Bedichek was born on June 27, 1878, in Cass County, Illinois, to parents James Madison Bedichek and Lucretia Ellen Craven. The family relocated to Falls County, Texas, in 1884. Bedichek attended country schools and the Bedichek Academy, founded by his father in Eddy, Texas. He enrolled at the University of Texas at Austin in February 1898. He received his Bachelor of Science in 1903. In 1925, after returning as an employee of the University system, he earned his Master of Arts.

=== Employment ===
His first job after college was as a reporter for the Fort Worth Record. Soon after, he was a high school teacher, first in Houston, Texas, and then in San Angelo, Texas. Next, he worked as the secretary of the Chamber of Commerce in Deming, New Mexico. While in Deming, he was the Editor of the Deming Headlight. By 1913, Bedichek had returned to Austin and became the secretary of the Young Men's Business League, which later was merged with the chamber of commerce. Subsequently, he was executive secretary of the Organization for Promoting Interest in Higher Education in Texas. Then, he served as city editor of the San Antonio Express. Finally, in the fall of 1917, he began work in Austin with the University Interscholastic League (UIL), which was then a part of the University of Texas Extension Bureau. He became the second Director of the league in 1922. He retired from this position in 1948.

=== Writing ===
At the urging of his friends, Walter Prescott Webb and J. Frank Dobie, he took a leave of leave in February 1946 to write his first book, Adventures with a Texas Naturalist. His second book and third books were awarded the Carr P. Collins Award for the best Texas book of the day by the Texas Institute of Letters (TIL). His last book was released posthumously.

=== Friends ===
While his friends J. Frank Dobie and Walter Prescott Webb are more renowned outside of Austin, in the community all three are respected equally. In the late 1960s to the early 1970s, the Austin Independent School District opened Middle Schools (then known as Junior Highs) named after all three men. Also, in 1994 a sculpture, known as Philosopher's Rock, portraying Roy Bedichek, J. Frank Dobie and Walter Prescott Webb was installed at Barton Springs Pool in Austin. The sculpture was fashioned in honor of their promotion of the preservation of Barton Springs.

== Media ==
- A documentary, Roy Bedichek's Vanishing Frontier, written, produced and directed by Rob Tranchin was shown nationally on PBS in April 2003.
- A one-act play by Steve Moore, Nightswim, about Bedichek, Dobie and Webb was first produced in Austin in Fall, 2004.

== Bibliography ==
- Bedichek, Roy; Ward Lockwood (1947). Adventures with a Texas Naturalist. Austin: University of Texas Press.
- Bedichek, Roy (1950). Karánkaway. Austin: University of Texas Press. Awarded outstanding Texas book of the year by TIL
- Bedichek, Roy (1956). Educational Competition: The Story of the University Interscholastic League of Texas. Austin: University of Texas Press. Awarded outstanding Texas book of the year by TIL
- Bedichek, Roy (1960). The Sense of Smell.
