= Lillian Greer Bedichek =

American educator

- Born: 1885; Keachie, Louisiana
- Died: 1971 (aged 85–86)
- Occupation: educator

Lillian Greer Bedichek (1885–1971) was an American educator.

== Early life and education ==
Lillian Greer Bedichek was the daughter of James Francis Greer and Virginia Lee. She was born in Keachie, Louisiana, and in 1893 the family moved to Waco, Texas upon James's appointment as vice president of Baylor University.

Bedichek attended Baylor University, but transferred. She earned her B.A. from the University of Texas, where she majored in Greek and minored in Latin. She later returned to the university for graduate study, earning her M.A. in 1926.

== Career ==
Bedichek taught at Grayson College and the Waco public school system prior to her marriage, and in Deming, New Mexico shortly before the birth of her first child. In 1917 she resumed her teaching career at Austin High School, eventually becoming the head of the Spanish department. Her textbook, Mastering Spanish, was published in 1945.

Bedichek was part of a network of educators and writers active in the American southwest. She collaborated with folklorist and language instructor Arthur L. Campa. She corresponded with educator George I. Sánchez. Harry Peyton Steger regarded her, along with her future husband, as a partner in his "intellectual firm."

Trading on her identity as "Mrs. Roy Bedichek," she wrote about life in the southwest, voicing concern about sharecropping and the future of private land ownership. She reviewed books about the region. Her advance endorsement of a Texans' biography was worthy of inclusion in advertisements.

She was made an honorary member of the Texas Institute of Letters in 1965. The University of Texas awards a scholarship named in honor of the Bedicheks.

== Personal life ==
In 1910 she married the naturalist Roy Bedichek. They had three children: Mary, Sarah, and Alston Lee (later Bachman Greer).
