= Coronado's Children =

1930 book by J. Frank Dobie

- Author: J. Frank Dobie
- Language: English
- Genre: American folklore
- Publisher: Southwest Press
- Publication date: 1930
- Publication place: United States

Coronado's Children (1930) was the second book written by J. Frank Dobie, published by The Southwest Press in 1930. It deals with lore of lost mines and lost treasures in the Southwestern United States, for the most part in Texas.

The Spanish explorer Francisco Vásquez de Coronado quested for the fabled Seven Cities of Gold in the 16th century. Dobie thought that recent searchers for lost mines and lost treasure in the Western United States were the spiritual heirs of Coronado, hence the name of the book, "Coronado's Children."

== See also ==
- Lost mines
- Buried treasure
