= Oliphant–Walker House =

Historic house in Texas, United States

- U.S. National Register of Historic Places
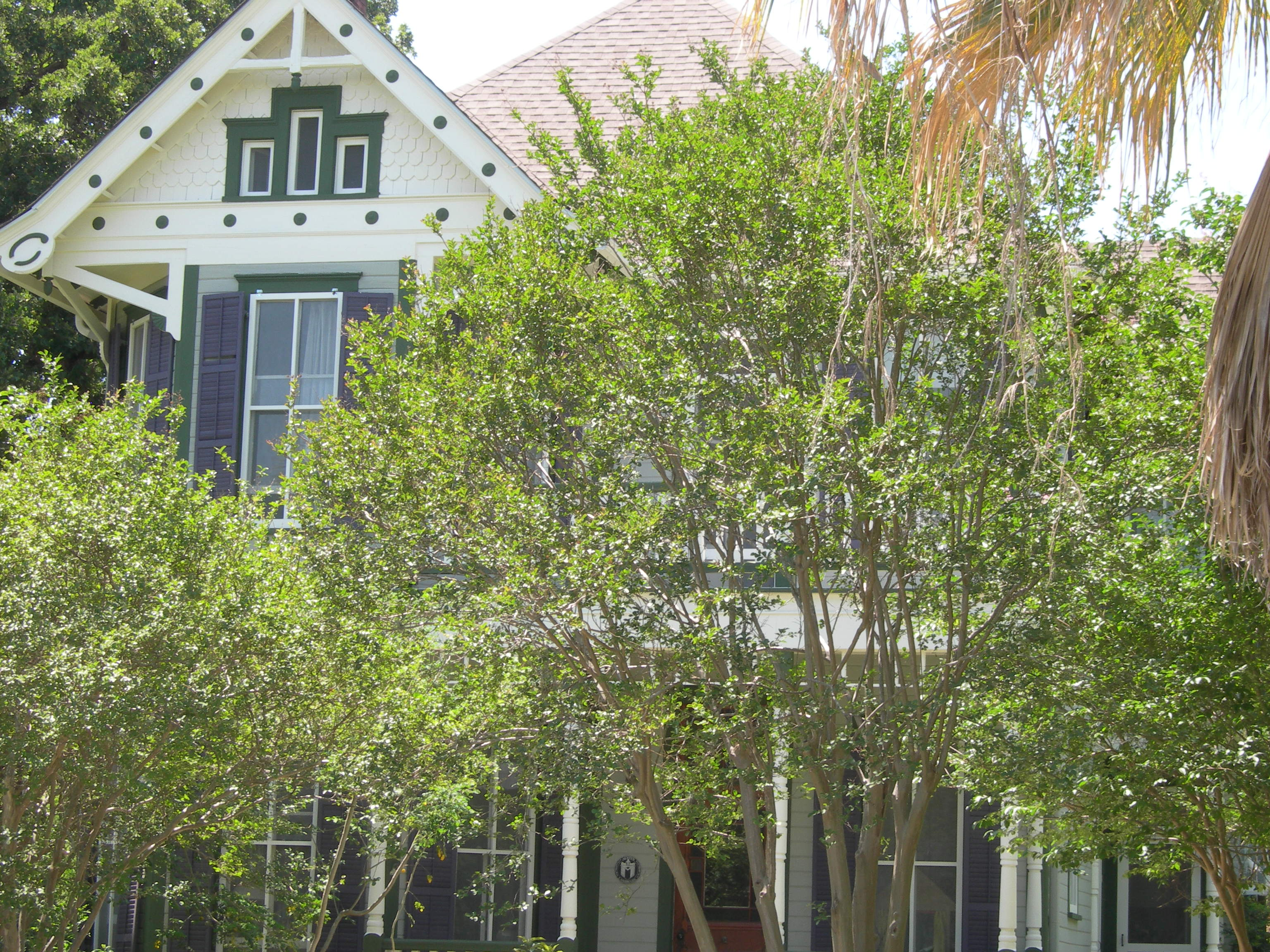
- Location: 3900 Ave. C Austin, Texas, US
- Coordinates: 30°18′10.95″N 97°44′04.70″W
- Built: 1894
- Architect: E.A. Ellingson
- Architectural style: Queen Anne
- MPS: Hyde Park MPS
- NRHP reference No.: 90001177
- Added to NRHP: August 16, 1990

The Oliphant–Walker House is a historic home in the Hyde Park Historic District in Austin, Texas.

== History ==
The house was built in 1894 by area resident William J. Oliphant (1845–1930), an accomplished photographer.

It is a prime example of Queen Anne style architecture, with an elaborate balustrade, front gable, and friezes. The house was sold to Anna Walker, president of the Austin Woman Suffrage Association (AWSA), in 1916.

The house is located at 3900 Avenue C. It was added to the National Register of Historic Places in 1990.
