= Harry Peyton Steger =

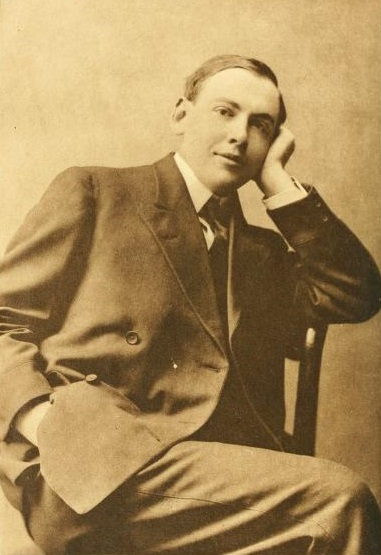
- Steger in 1904 (age 22)
- Born: March 2, 1883; Moscow, Tennessee, U.S.
- Died: January 4, 1913 (aged 29); New York City, New York
- Education: University of Texas
- Occupations: Editor, writer, professor
- Spouse: Dorothy McCormick

Harry Peyton Steger (2 March 1883 – 4 January 1913) was an American writer and editor.

== Career overview ==
Steger was born in Moscow, Tennessee, in 1883. After attending public schools there he entered the University of Texas. Following his graduation, he attended the Balliol College, Oxford as a Rhodes Scholar and later went to Johns Hopkins, where he studied Sanskrit. Harry Steger worked as a journalist both in England and in America. He was also a literary adviser to Doubleday, Page & Co., literary executor of O. Henry, and editor of Short Stories Magazine. He died in New York city of kidney failure. He is buried in Willow Wild Cemetery in Bonham, Fannin County, Texas.

== Works ==
- "Photographing the Cowboy as he Disappears," The World's Work, Vol. XVII, 1909.
- "O. Henry: Who he is and How he Works," The World's Work, Vol. XVIII, 1909.
- The Letters of Harry Peyton Steger, 1899–1912, Published by the Ex-Students' Association of the University of Texas, 1915.

Miscellany

- O. Henry, Rolling Stones, with an Introduction by Harry Peyton Steger, Doubleday, Page & Company, 1913.
