= Sarah Bedichek Pipkin =

American geneticist

- Born: 1913; Deming, New Mexico, United States
- Died: 1977 (aged 63–64); Washington, D.C.
- Education: University of Texas
- Scientific career
- Fields: Genetics

Sarah Craven Bedichek Pipkin (1913–1977) was an American geneticist.

== Education ==
Pipkin earned her B.A. in zoology (Phi Beta Kappa) and Ph.D. in genetics from the University of Texas, where she studied with J. T. Patterson and H. J. Muller. She was awarded a Rockefeller fellowship to King's College, London and studied under J. B. S. Haldane.

== Career ==
Upon earning her doctorate, Pipkin taught anatomy and physiology at Texas State College for Women. From 1938 to 1942, she taught zoology at North Texas Agricultural College, and in 1946 taught biology and zoology at the Catholic University of Beirut. Pipkin taught medical genetics at the American University of Beirut School of Medicine, and held appointments at various other institutions, including Gorgas Memorial Laboratory in Panama and Johns Hopkins University. She was appointed to the Howard University faculty in 1967 and became a full professor in 1970.

Pipkin studied Drosophila melanogaster triploids and chromosome balance, population genetics, species introgression, and feeding habits. A Rockefeller Foundation grant supported her work on seasonal fluctuations of Lebanese species of Drosophila. She ended her career with research on the genetics of dehydrogenases.

== Personal life ==
Pipkin was the daughter of naturalist Roy Bedichek and educator Lillian Greer Bedichek. In 1938, she married zoologist Alan Pipkin with whom she had three children. His career dictated the family's location, and Pipkin cobbled together research appointments to continue her work.
