= Thomas Calloway Lea Jr. =

American attorney (1877–1945)

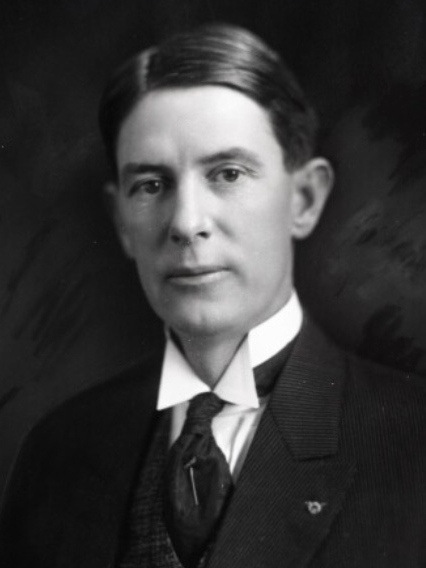

18th Mayor of El Paso
- In office 1915–1917
- Preceded by: Charles E. Kelley
- Succeeded by: Charles Davis

Personal details
- Born: October 29, 1877 Independence, Missouri, U.S.
- Died: August 2, 1945 (aged 67) El Paso, Texas, U.S.
- Party: Democratic
- Spouse(s): Zola May Utt (1906–1936; her death), Rosario Partida Archer (1939–1945; his death)
- Children: 3, including Tom Lea III
- Education: University of Missouri–Kansas City
- Profession: Attorney, judge

Thomas Calloway Lea Jr. (October 29, 1877 – August 2, 1945) was an American attorney from El Paso, Texas, and mayor of that city from 1915 to 1917.

== Biography ==
Lea was born in Independence, Missouri, to Thomas Calloway and Amanda Rose Lea.

His father, Thomas Calloway Sr., was county surveyor (commissioner) for Jackson County from 1870 to 1880 (a position that Harry S. Truman held from 1925 to 1933), then was deputy surveyor until his death on April 20, 1910.

His grandfather, Dr. Pleasant John Graves Lea (also grandfather of Homer Lea, author of The Vermilion Pencil: A Romance of China), is the namesake for Lee's Summit, Missouri, although the name became spelled with an "e" instead of "a" because a stone culvert next to the Missouri Pacific Railroad station was set this way. Homer Lea was appointed military advisory to Sun Yat-sen, the leader of the Chinese Republic.

Lea received an LL.B. degree in 1898 from Kansas City Law School. Lea began his law practice in 1904 and was soon appointed police-court judge. On June 29, 1906, he married Zola May Utt, and the couple had three sons, including the noted artist and writer Tom Lea III. Thomas Jr. volunteered for both the Spanish–American War and World War I (Homer Lea also wanted to join the Army with Thomas, but because of his medical condition was not accepted), and during the former he went to Fort Sam Houston, in San Antonio, Texas, for officers' training school. After the end of his service in the Spanish–American War, he decided to stay in Texas, moving to El Paso.

Lea became a renowned criminal lawyer in the city, and with his partner, R. Ewing Thomason, developed acclaim for their use of dramatic emotionalism in the courtroom. In April, 1911, he presided over the hearing of community activist Lázaro Gutiérrez de Lara. For some time, Lea served as the official attorney for former Mexican president Victoriano Huerta. Lea's administration passed the first U.S. law banning Mexican hemp because of its association with Mexican revolutionaries.

Lea and Thomason decided to enter politics, and took on two more partners, J. G. McGrady and Eugene T. Edwards. Lea was elected mayor (defeating incumbent Charles E. "Henry" Kelly), and Thomason was elected to the Texas House of Representatives in 1916. Harry S. Truman later appointed Thomason as a federal district judge. As mayor, Lea made a public declaration, after Pancho Villa raided Columbus, New Mexico, on March 9, 1916, that he would arrest Villa if he dared enter El Paso. Villa then responded by offering a thousand pesos worth of gold bounty on Lea. The Lea children had to have a police escort to and from school.

In 1936, Zola May died of cancer, and Lea remarried on May 20, 1939, to Mexican-born Rosario Partida Archer (née Partida). Thomas Calloway Lea Jr. died in El Paso at Southwestern General Hospital, of a heart attack, on August 2, 1945.

Lea was a 40-year member of the State Bar of Texas, and a Mason.

== Recognition ==
- Thomas C. Lea Park in El Paso
