= Hamilton Biscoe Hillyer =

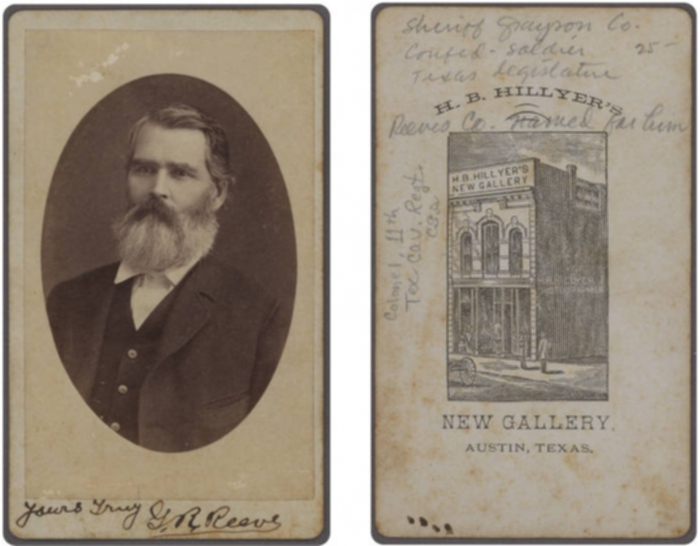
Col. George Robertson Reeves

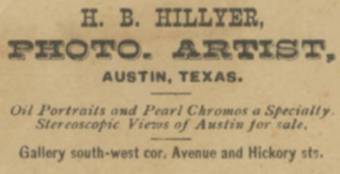

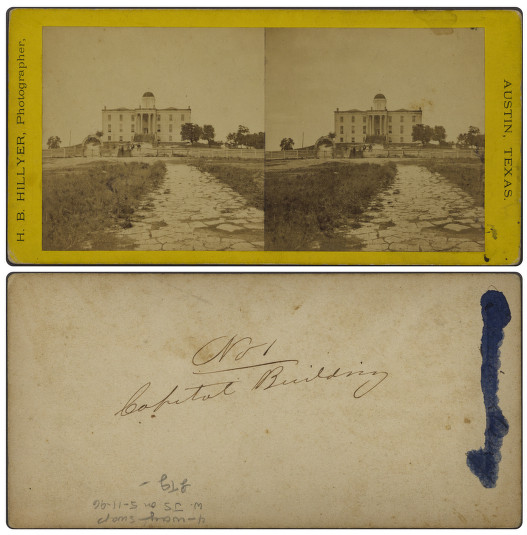
Stereoscopic view of the Texas Capitol

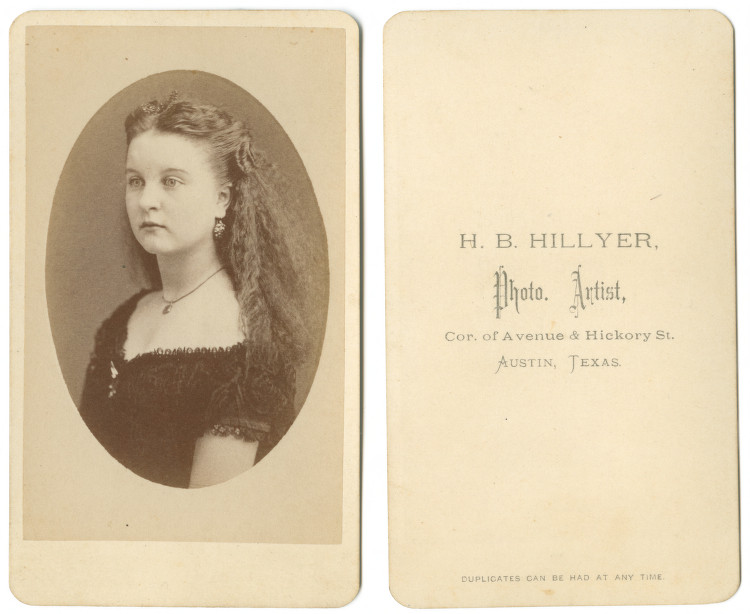

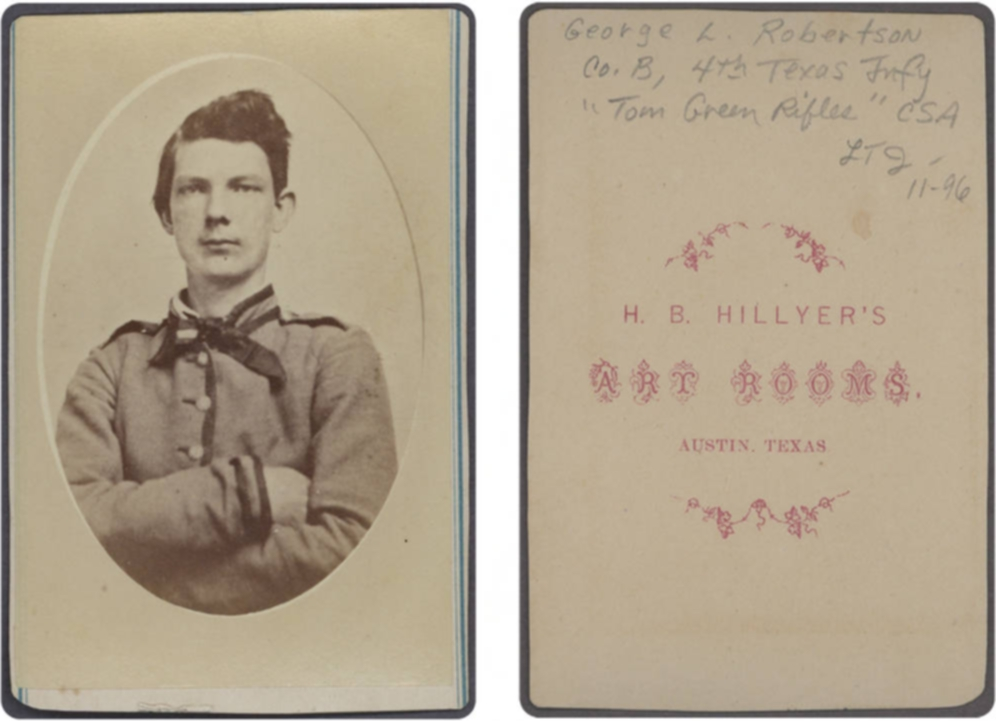
Private George L. Robertson, Company B, 4th Texas Infantry Regiment

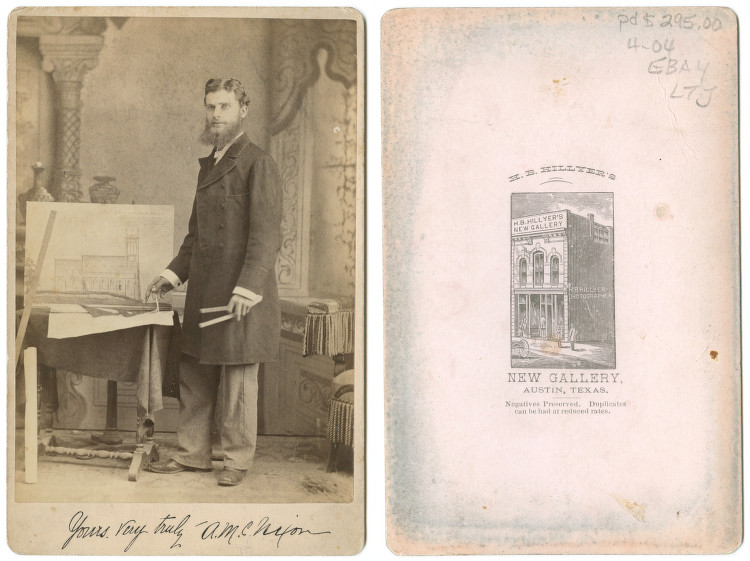
A. M. C. Nixon

Hamilton Biscoe Hillyer (August 14, 1835 - December 10, 1903) was a photographer in Texas. He had a studio in Austin. He was the official state photographer, and photographed state legislators, producing composites of members of the Texas House of Representatives.

== Early life ==
He was born in Georgia to Rev. John Freeman Hillyer and Mary Adeline née Biscoe Hillyer. His family arrived in Galveston, Texas, December 1, 1847, and moved to Goliad, Texas, in 1848. His father established Hillyer Female College there before moving to Gonzales, Texas, in 1852 and teaching at Gonzales College.

== Career ==
H. B. Hillyer worked as a cowhand on a large cattle ranch for five years. He ordered an ambrotype kit from Anderson & Blessing in New Orleans in 1857. Hillyer had a studio in Austin and used tent studios to travel. In addition to portraits, he did Austin and events including a fire and flooding.

His photographs included daguerreotypes, ambrotypes, carte de visites, stereoscopic images, and gelatin silver prints.

He was vice president of the National Photographic Association in 1872, and published "technical articles" in The Philadelphia Photographer and Texas Farm and Ranch.

He photographed architect Arthur M. C. Nixon of Nixon & Wilson (a partnership with William W. Wilson) at the corner of Congress Avenue and Bois d'Arc.

He worked with his son C. Ernest Hillyer, who also became a photographer.

== Later life ==
He married Mary Emma Storey, and they had four children from 1858 until 1885. After she died he married fellow photographer Alice Danforth Turner in 1887 and they had two children.

He later lived in Belton and then Bowie, Texas.

He is buried at Bowie Cemetery.
