= United States Court House (El Paso) =

- El Paso US Courthouse
- U.S. National Register of Historic Places
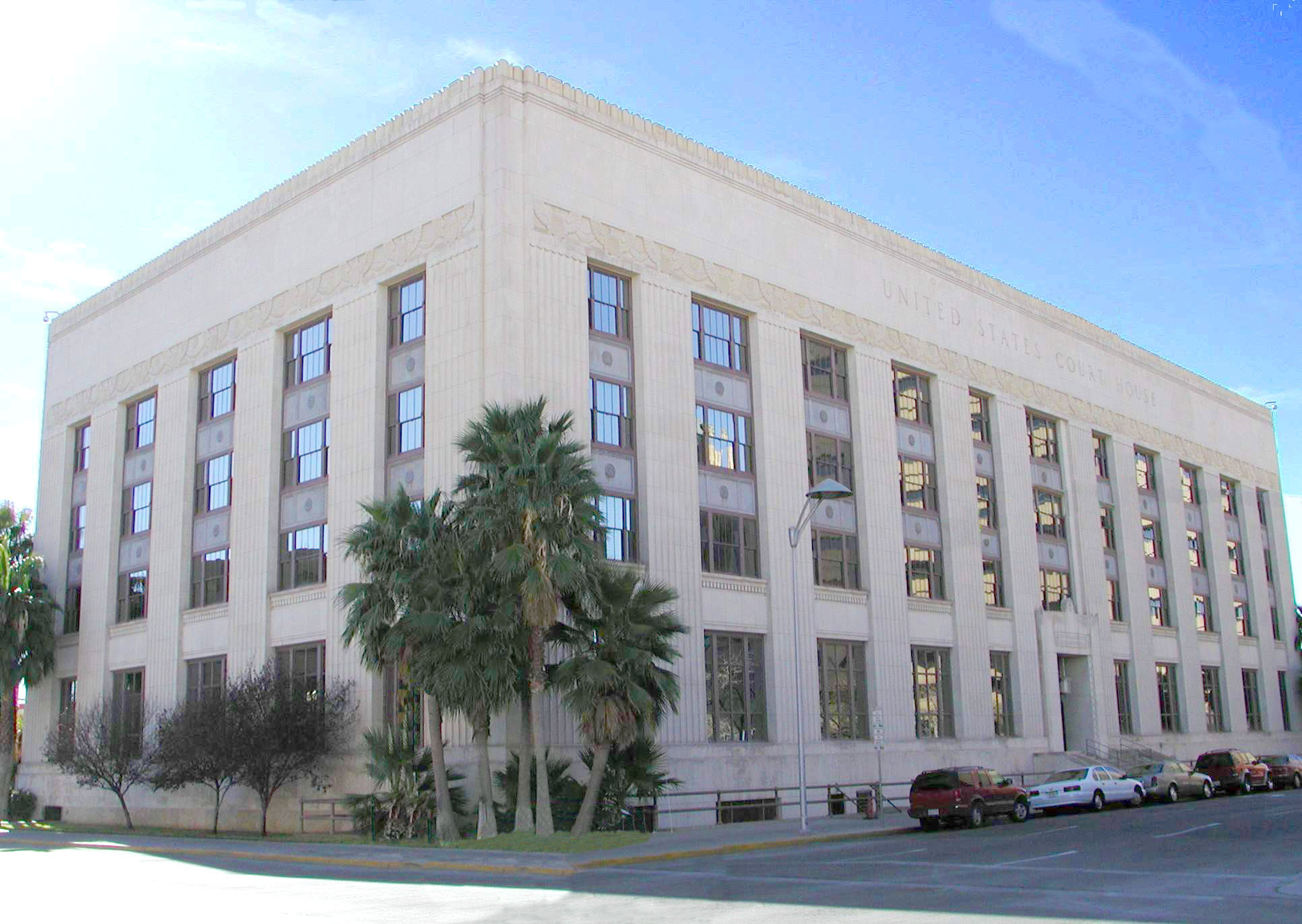
- US Courthouse in El Paso, Texas

- Location within Texas Location within the United States
- Location: 511 E. San Antonio Ave., El Paso, Texas
- Coordinates: 31°45′33″N 106°29′0″W
- Area: 1 acre (0.40 ha)
- Built: 1936
- Architect: Percy McGhee, Guy L. Fraser, et al.
- Architectural style: Moderne
- NRHP reference No.: 01000434
- Added to NRHP: April 25, 2001

The El Paso U.S. Courthouse, also known as El Paso Federal Building or the U.S. Court House, is a historic building in El Paso, Texas. It is a courthouse of the United States District Court for the Western District of Texas. The building was completed in 1936 and served historically as a courthouse and as a government office building. It is located at 511 East San Antonio Avenue. It was listed on the National Register of Historic Places in 2001.

== Significance ==
The Courthouse gives the Federal Government a strong, tangible presence in downtown El Paso. Designed and built in the mid-1930s the building is similar in size, style and construction to government buildings of this era across the country. The architects were Percy McGhee, Guy L. Frazer, and Thomas P. Lippincott. The Neo-Classical Revival facades and durable materials of the blocklike exterior communicate the importance of the functions housed therein to the citizens of the community. The government commissioned artist Thomas C. Lea, III to paint a mural (Pass of the North) in the courthouse in 1938.

The basic plan layout is also fairly typical for buildings of this size and era, with spaces configured between and around two large interior courtyards. This arrangement provides light and air to interior rooms, in a way appropriate to the hot, dry climate of Southwest Texas. Originally designed to house two Courts along with offices for related branches of government, growth of the Courts has generated most of the plan changes over time. As of 2010, there were seven courtrooms in the U.S. Courthouse, with an eighth in the planning stage.

== Architectural description ==
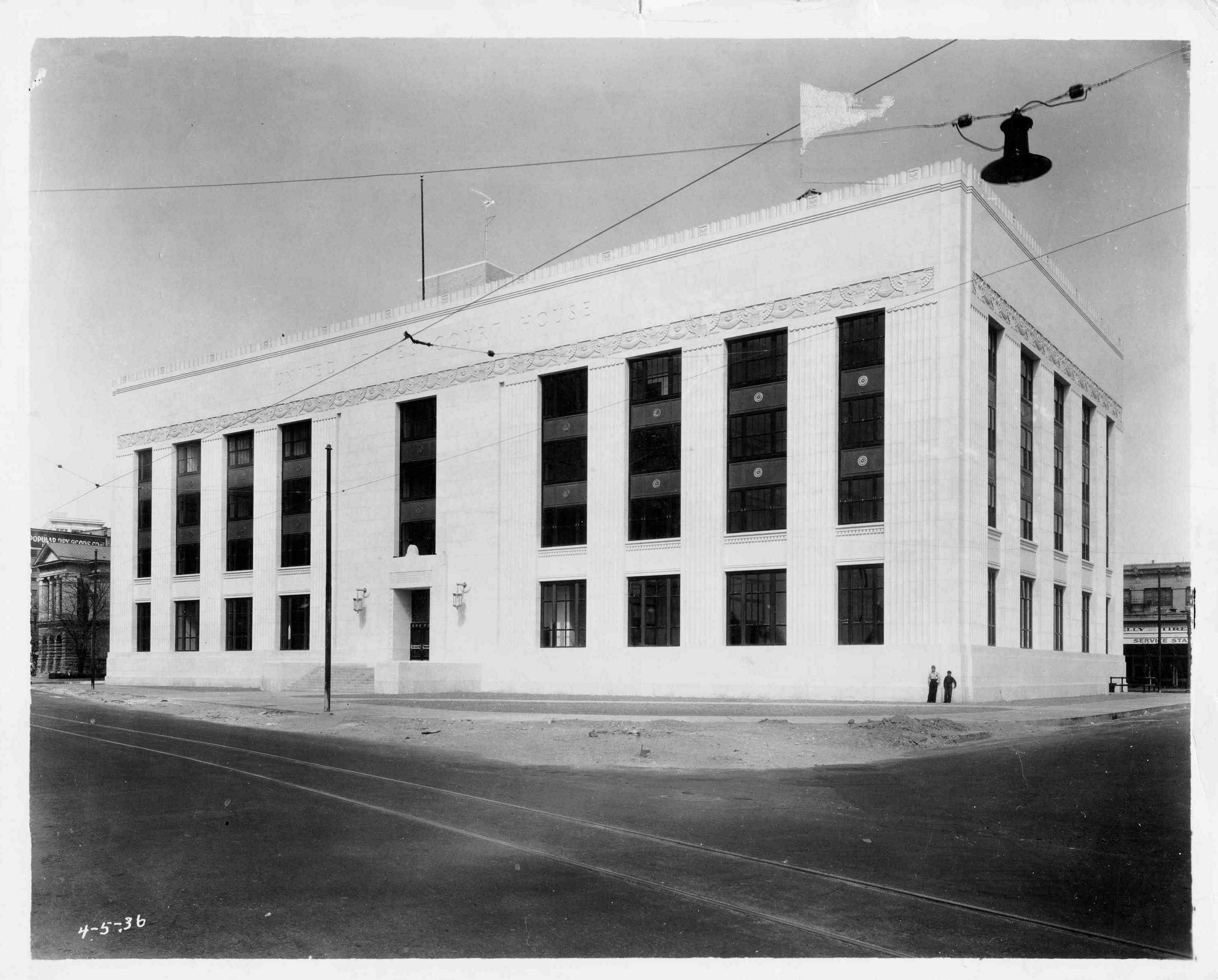
Courthouse in 1936

The United States Courthouse is a rectilinear Neo-Classical Revival composition with Art Deco influences. The plan is rectangular and biaxially symmetrical with respect to the exterior facades, except for a service door on the west side. Rooms are for the most part arranged on either side of an interior corridor around two Light Courts. The elevations are composed of a flat fossilized limestone base, repetitive limestone pilasters separated by windows and a windowless limestone architrave with terra cotta ornament and coping concealing the fifth floor and a flat roof. The dressed stone base extends from grade to the first floor window sill height, where tall casement windows are spanned with limestone panels. The second, third and fourth floor double hung windows are treated as a continuous vertical element between pilasters separated by cast aluminum spandrels. The windowless fifth floor was designed and built with skylights which have now been abandoned. On the facades outside this level the stone architrave is set off with a repeating stylized eagle terra cotta frieze. The fluted pilasters run between the base and architrave, and have no base or capital of their own. The exterior of the building has been largely unaltered with the exception of a limestone faced ramp added for the handicapped. This ramp is compatible with the original building, if less well detailed.

Inside the Courthouse additions and alterations have been generally less sensitive. The East Light Court has been enclosed at the first level to accommodate a new courtroom. A second large courtroom was added on the second floor at the west end, two floors below one of the two original courts. These spaces have no historical significance but are adequate and appropriate for their new use. Three other courts have been added to the building, which are of insufficient size and deficient shape for their purpose. Except for the Clerk's Office, functions not directly tied to the Courtrooms have been relocated to renovated spaces, lessening the logic and integrity of the building.

Much of the usable basement level has been sacrificed to accommodate hvac ductwork, while the remainder is in original condition. The first floor has been altered to an extent but retains much of its original details and finishes. Almost all of the wood and glass partitions that defined interior spaces and determined their character have been replaced by gypsum board walls. The main public spaces have been best preserved on this level, including the south lobby with its large, important mural across the north wall. The second and third floors retain little of their original character, but the fourth floor retains in largely unaltered form its two courtrooms and its public spaces. The fifth floor was originally toplit and used for storage and a laboratory. With the skylights closed off, it is now dark and confining, housing two Immigration Courts and their related functions. Throughout the building most of the terrazzo flooring, Art Deco hardware, paneled doors with transoms and period light fixtures are still in place.

== See also ==
- National Register of Historic Places listings in El Paso County, Texas
