= Thomas C. Lea III =

American polymath (1907–2001)

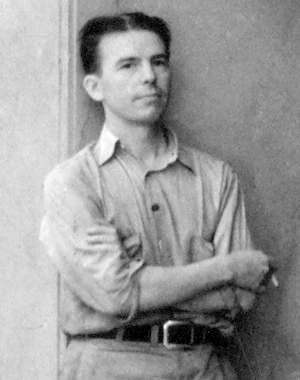
- Tom Lea in 1938
- Born: Thomas Calloway Lea III; July 11, 1907; El Paso, Texas, U.S.
- Died: January 29, 2001 (aged 93); El Paso, Texas, U.S.
- Occupations: Author, painter
- Spouse(s): Nancy June Taylor (1927; her death 1936); Sarah Dighton (1938; her death 2008)
- Children: James Dighton Lea
- Writing career
- Genres: Non-fiction, murals, fiction
- Subjects: West Texas; World War II; Ranching; Bullfighting; North-central Mexico

Thomas Calloway Lea III (July 11, 1907 – January 29, 2001) was an American muralist, illustrator, artist, war correspondent, novelist, and historian. The bulk of his art and literary works were about Texas, north-central Mexico, and his World War II experience in the South Pacific and Asia. Two of his most popular novels, The Brave Bulls and The Wonderful Country, are widely considered to be classics of southwestern American literature.

== Early life and education ==
Lea was born on July 11, 1907, in El Paso, Texas, to Thomas Calloway Lea Jr. and Zola May (née Utt). From 1915 to 1917, his father was mayor of El Paso. As mayor, his father made a public declaration that he would arrest Pancho Villa if he dared enter El Paso, after Villa raided Columbus, New Mexico on March 9, 1916. Villa then responded by offering a thousand pesos gold bounty on Lea. For six months Tom and his brother Joe had to have a police escort to and from school, and there was a 24-hour guard on the house.

He graduated from El Paso High School in 1924. From 1924 to 1926, he attended the Art Institute of Chicago and then apprenticed and assisted John W. Norton, a Chicago muralist, from 1927 to 1932.

In 1927, he wed Nancy June Taylor, a fellow art student. In 1930, Norton suggested that Tom take an art tour of Europe to study the masters. He and Nancy went to Paris and saw an exhibit of Eugène Delacroix at the Louvre, and Delacroix was his "favorite". Next they traveled to Florence, Orvieto, Rome, Capri. Then, after a four-month tour, it was back to Le Havre to catch the SS Ile de France.

After the tour of Italy, they moved to Santa Fe to be with other artists and be in the Southwest. When Nancy became ill (a botched appendectomy), they moved to El Paso, and Lea found work from the New Deal art projects.

== Career ==
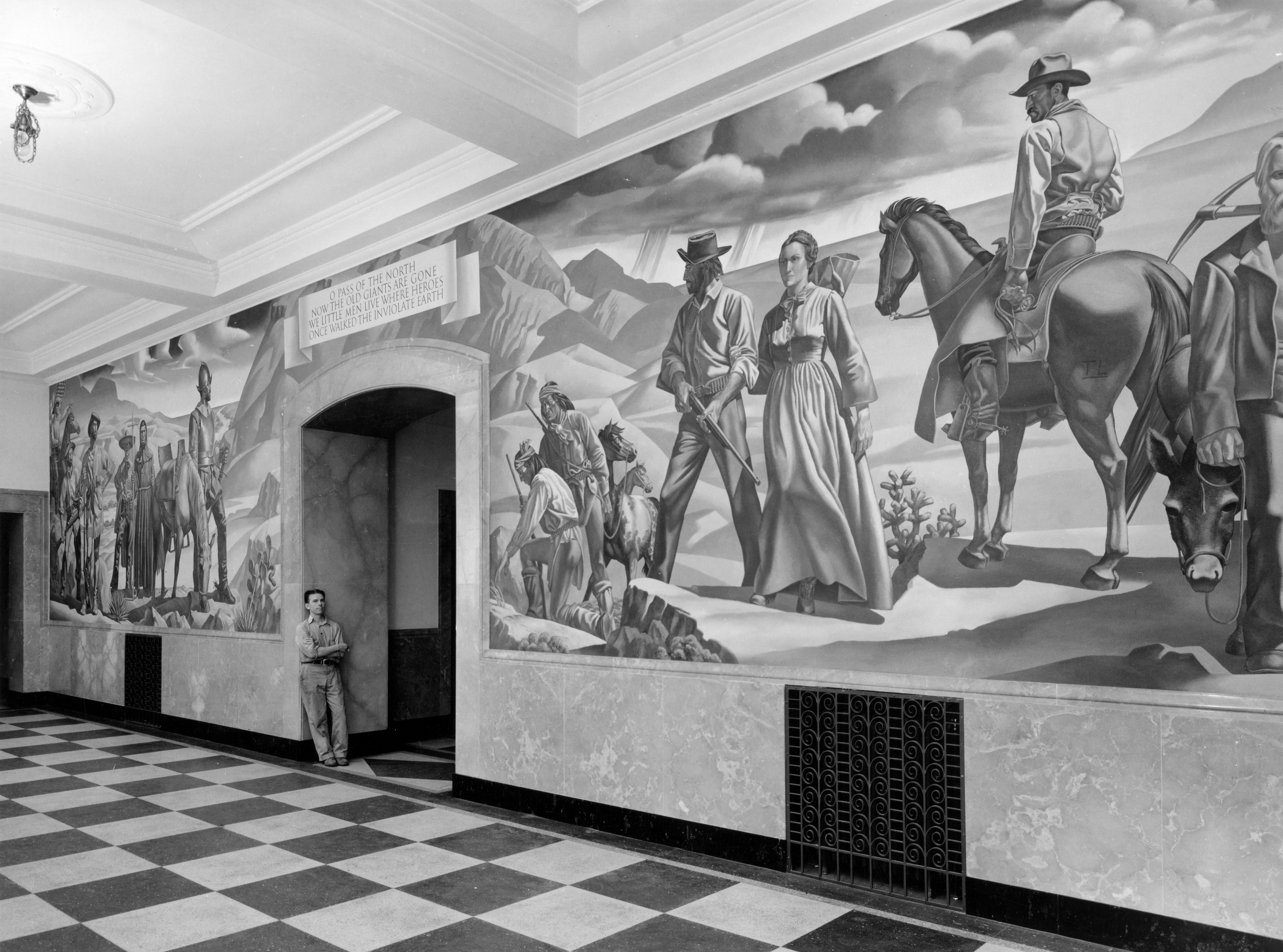
Tom Lea (center) after completing Pass of the North (1938), his mural at the United States Court House in El Paso, Texas

Lea won the Section of Painting and Sculpture competition for a mural commission in the United States Post Office Department Building (now the William Jefferson Clinton Federal Building) in Washington, D.C., called The Nesters. His other murals included those for the post offices in Odessa, Texas (Stampede), Pleasant Hill, Missouri (Back Home, April 1865), and Seymour, Texas (Comanches). In 1936, his wife (in April), grandmother (in June), and his mother (in December), all died in that year.

In 1937, he started doing illustration work, and this led to a partnership with a friend of his father, author J. Frank Dobie. Dobie wrote about the rough life of settling the Texas frontier and Lea's illustrations are mostly of cowboys and the wild Texas landscapes. While painting a mural in El Paso Federal Courthouse (Pass of the North), he met and married his second wife, Sarah Catherine Beane (née Dighton), in July 1938. Sarah had come from Monticello, Illinois, to El Paso to visit friends. Sarah had a son, James (Jim), from a previous marriage whom Lea adopted. While painting his courthouse mural, Lea also met artist José Cisneros and they were able to connect as friends and business contacts. That same year his started his lifelong partnership with Carl Hertzog (Jean Carl Hertzog Sr.), an El Paso book designer and typographer. 1937–1938 would prove to be the antithesis of 1936, providing Lea with three lifelong partners and friends.

In 1940, he applied for and won the Rosenwald Fellowship, but by the end of the summer of 1941, he got a telegram from LIFE asking him to go to sea with the United States Navy on a North Atlantic Patrol. In the fall of 1941, he decided to paint for LIFE as war artist and correspondent aboard a destroyer. He traveled all over the world with the United States military from 1941 to 1945. This included: China, Great Britain, Italy, India, North Africa, North Atlantic, the Middle East, and the Western Pacific. He went on deployment with the aircraft carrier USS Hornet in the Pacific Ocean in 1942, where he met the famous Army Air Corps pilot Jimmy Doolittle. Lea was on board the Hornet (September 15, 1942) when the USS Wasp was sunk by torpedoes from a Japanese submarine. He painted several pictures of the sinking of the Wasp. In 1943, during his visit to China, he met Theodore H. White, and he painted the portraits of Generalissimo Chiang Kai-shek and his wife, Soong Mei-ling; and General Claire Lee Chennault, leader of the Flying Tigers.

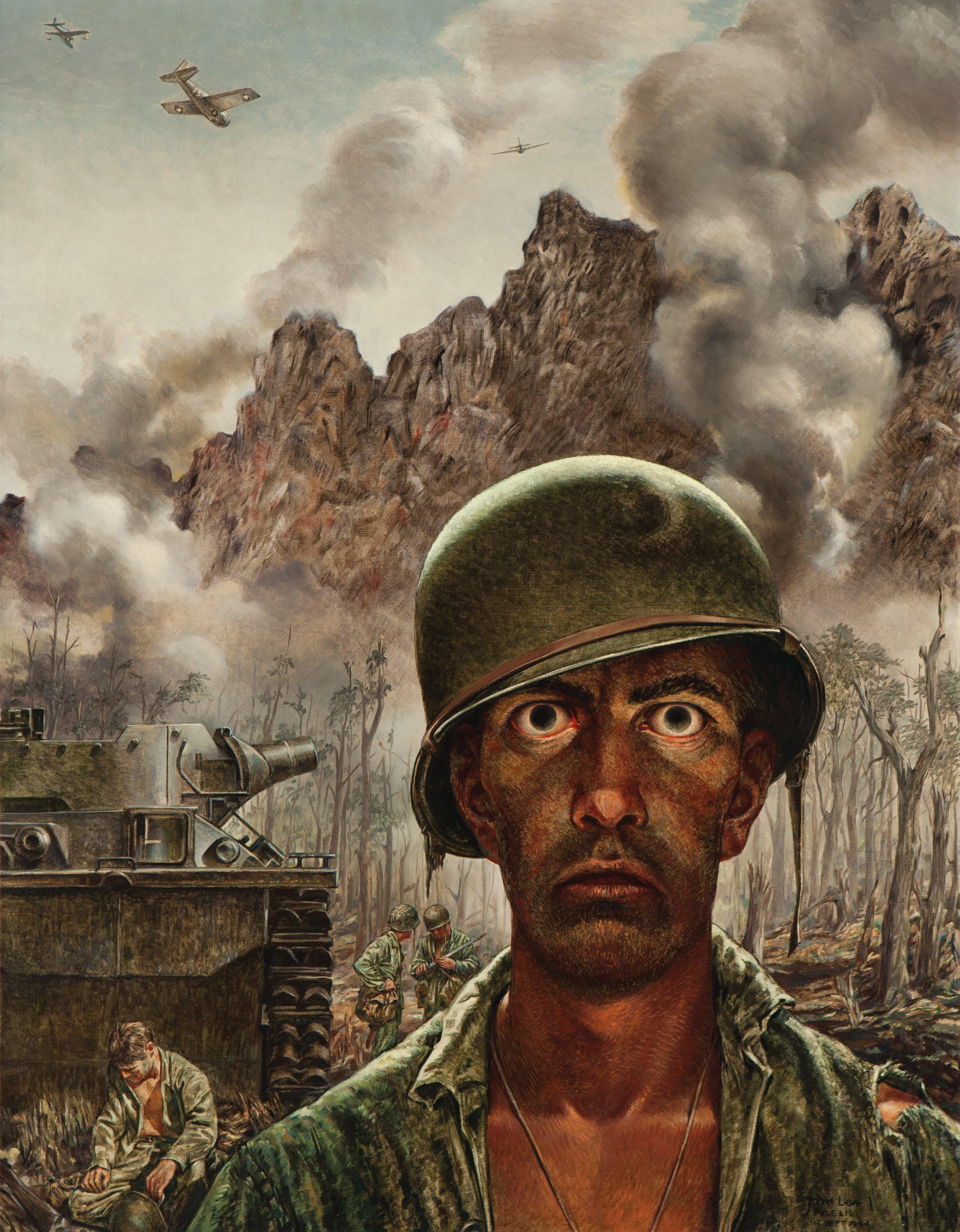
The Two-Thousand Yard Stare (1944)

Some of Lea's most notable work came during his time as a combat correspondent with the United States 1st Marine Division at the Battle of Peleliu. The battle, which saw the Marines suffer heavy losses amidst fierce Japanese resistance, became the subject of controversy due to the questionable strategic value of the island. Lea described his time there as "…trying to keep from getting killed and trying to memorize what I saw and felt." His vivid depiction of the beach landing and subsequent battle across the island included two of his most famous works, The Price and The Two-Thousand Yard Stare, both of which spotlight the human toll of the battle.

In 1947, Lea finished a graphite sketch on kraft paper of his wife called Study for Sarah in the Summertime. He had started the sketch two years earlier, about six months after he got home from the war. The life size work (71" × 30¼") was based on a photograph, taken of Sarah in the backyard of their home at 1520 Raynolds Boulevard in El Paso, that he had carried in his wallet throughout the war. An oil painting, Sarah in the Summertime (67" × 32"), was then done from the sketch. He spent longer on this combined work than any other painting.

After finishing his last novel, The Hands of Cantu (an account of horse training in 16th-century Nueva Vizcaya) in 1964, Lea traveled to Boston to meet with his publishers, Little, Brown and Company. He told them that he wasn't interested in another novel, so they suggested a book about his pictures. This 1968 work, A Picture Gallery, was his "autobiography", writing of why and when he did his paintings. Working on A Picture Gallery would lead him to once again focus on painting and turn away from working on literature. Right before finishing this work, Baylor University paid tribute to his writing by bestowing him, and his long-time friend Carl Hertzog, with an honorary doctorate's in literature. The El Paso Museum of Art established its Tom Lea Gallery in 1996, and in 1997 he was honored as a Fellow in the Texas State Historical Association. President George W. Bush had Lea's painting Rio Grande displayed in the Oval Office.

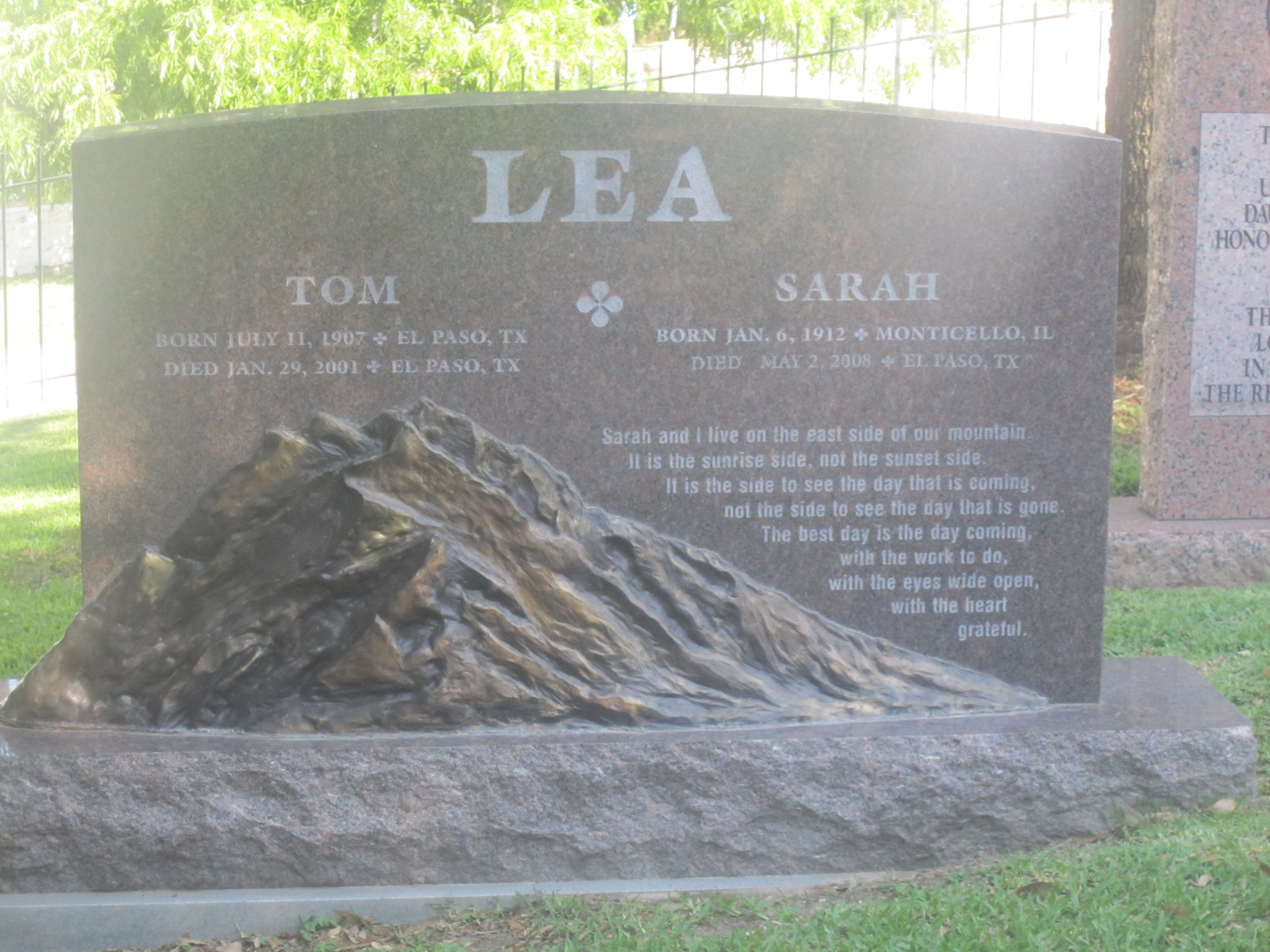
Lea gravestone at Texas State Cemetery in Austin, Texas

Lea died in El Paso on January 29, 2001, at the age of 93.

My friend, the artist Tom Lea of El Paso, Texas, captured the way I feel about our great land, a land I love. He and his wife, he said, "live on the east side of the mountain. It's the sunrise side, not the sunset side. It is the side to see the day that is coming, not to see the day that has gone."

— President George W. Bush
Acceptance speech at the 2000 Republican National Convention

== Awards ==
=== Lifetime achievement ===
- 1967: Honorary doctorate – Baylor University
- 1970: Honorary doctorate – Southern Methodist University
- 1971: Distinguished Public Service Award – United States Navy
- 1975: Hall of Honor – El Paso County Historical Society
- 1981: Lon Tinkle Award – Texas Institute of Letters
- 1990: Ima Hogg Historical Achievement Award
- ____: Colonel John W. Thomason Jr. Award for Artistic Achievement – United States Marine Corps
- 1995: Hall of Great Westerners – National Cowboy & Western Heritage Museum
- 2007: Tom Lea Centennial Celebration – United States Congress
  - ____: S. Res. 267 (Hutchison Resolution) – U.S. Senate July 2007 as "Tom Lea Month"
  - ____: H. Res. 519 – U.S. House of Representatives

=== Literature ===
- 1992: Owen Wister Award – Western Writers of America

== Art works ==
=== Public murals ===
State of Texas Centennial Commission, Federal Art Project (FAP) for the Works Progress Administration (WPA) and Public Works of Art Project for the United States Department of the Treasury.

- "Illinois Heritage Series" (4 murals; 8' H. × W. 12' each) – Calumet Park Field House, Chicago, Illinois, 1927–28

Native-American Ceremony
Father Jacques Marquette and Louis Joliet
Native-American Hunting Party Returning Home
Native-Americans and Fur Traders

(These murals were restored in 2005 by The Chicago Park District and The Chicago Conservation Center.)

- South Park Commission Building (auditorium), Gage Park, Chicago, Illinois, 1931
- Hall of State, Texas State Fair Grounds, Dallas, Texas, 1935
- The Nesters, – Ariel Rios Federal Building, 1937, mural (lost)

(Environmental Protection Agency; formerly Post Office Department Building & Benjamin Franklin Post Office)

- Pass of the North, – El Paso Federal Courthouse, 1938, oil on canvas
- Back Home: April 1865, – U.S. Post Office – Pleasant Hill, Missouri, 1939, oil on canvas
- Stampede, – U.S. Post Office – Odessa, Texas, 1940, oil on canvas
- Comanches, – U.S. Post Office – Seymour, Texas, 1942, oil on canvas
- Conquistadors, – New Mexico State University, College Library, Mesilla Park, New Mexico (PWAP funding)
- Southwest, – El Paso Public Library, El Paso, Texas, 1954, (donated work)
- First Book about New Mexico 1610, - Branigan Cultural Center - Las Cruces, New Mexico 1935

=== Paintings ===
- Two-Thousand-Yard Stare, – United States Army Center of Military History, Fort Lesley J. McNair, Washington, D.C., – 1944, oil on canvas

(This painting defined the term "thousand yard stare" in culture.)

- Rio Grande, – Oval Office – White House, Washington D.C., – 1954, oil on canvas

(since 2001; on loan to George W. and Laura Bush from the El Paso Museum of Art)

- Southwest, Study for, – American Art Museum, Smithsonian, Washington, D.C., – 1956. Oil on canvas, 10 × 32 in. (Frame: 19½ × 41¼ × 2)

(This is a scale study of the mural, Southwest, at the El Paso Public Library.)

=== Major exhibitions ===
- 1948: Dallas Museum of Art – Dallas, Texas, – "Drawings and Illustrations" (February March 8, 7)
- 1948: Dallas Museum of Art – Dallas, Texas, – "Paintings/Western Beef Cattle" (October 7, 1950-January 14)
- 1961: Fort Worth Art Center – Fort Worth, Texas
- 1963: El Paso Museum of Art – El Paso, Texas
- 1969: Institute of Texan Cultures – San Antonio, Texas
- 1971: El Paso Museum of Art – El Paso, Texas
- 1994: El Paso Museum of Art – El Paso, Texas
- 2015: Bullock Texas State History Museum – Austin, Texas
- 2015: National Museum of the Pacific War – Fredericksburg, Texas
- 2016: National WWII Museum – New Orleans, Louisiana

=== Permanent collections ===
- Austin, Texas:
  - The Tom Lea Collections – Harry Ransom Humanities Research Center at the University of Texas at Austin,
  - Blanton Museum of Art
- Dallas, Texas:
  - Dallas Museum of Art
- El Paso, Texas:
  - Tom Lea Gallery – El Paso Museum of Art
  - Tom Lea Papers – University Library—Special Collections at the University of Texas at El Paso
  - Tom Lea – Adair Margo Gallery
  - Tom Lea – El Paso County Historical Society
  - Tom Lea Library - The University of Texas at El Paso
- Laramie, Wyoming:
  - University of Wyoming Art Museum
- Santa Fe, New Mexico:
  - New Mexico Museum of Art

== Bibliography ==
=== Works by ===
==== Illustrative works ====
- 1939: Dobie, J. Frank (author). – Apache Gold and Yaqui Silver. – Boston: Little, Brown and Company. – 9049964

1984: – Austin, Texas: University of Texas Press. – ISBN 978-0-292-70381-0

- 1941: Dobie, J. Frank (author). – The Longhorns. – Boston: Little, Brown and Company. – 561214

1980: – Austin, Texas: University of Texas Press. – ISBN 978-0-292-74627-5

- 1946: Calendar of Twelve Travelers through the Pass of the North. – El Paso: Carl Hertzog. – 2691472

1981: – El Paso, Texas: El Paso Electric Company. – 7968462

==== Non-fiction works with illustrations ====
- 1945: Peleliu Landing. – El Paso: Carl Hertzog. – 2637403
- 1949: Bullfight Manual for Spectators. – Ciudad Juárez, Mexico: Plaza de Toros. – 1862606

1957: – El Paso, Texas: Carl Hertzog. – 3197954

- 1957: The King Ranch. – with Richard King. – Boston: Little, Brown and Company. – 692613

Kingsville, Texas: Printed for the King Ranch by Carl Hertzog. – 2981776

- 1968: Tom Lea, A Picture Gallery: Paintings and Drawings. – Boston: Little, Brown and Company. – 438075 (autobiography)
- 1974: In the Crucible of the Sun. – Kingsville, Texas: King Ranch. – 1195170
- 1998: Battle Stations: A Grizzly from the Coral Sea, Peleliu Landing. – Dallas: Still Point Press. – ISBN 978-0-933841-07-9

==== Fiction works with illustrations ====
- 1949: The Brave Bulls, A Novel. – Boston: Little, Brown and Company. – 4622973

2002: – Austin, Texas: University of Texas Press. – ISBN 978-0-292-74733-3

- 1952: The Wonderful Country, A Novel. – Boston: Little, Brown and Company. – 288704

2002: – Fort Worth, Texas: TCU Press. – ISBN 978-0-87565-261-0

- 1960: The Primal Yoke, A Novel. – Boston: Little, Brown and Company. – 1306682
- 1964: The Hands of Cantú. – Boston: Little, Brown and Company. – 1379124

=== Works about ===
- Lea, Tom (illustrations), and the Fort Worth Art Center, (1961). – Tom Lea. – Fort Worth, Texas: Fort Worth Art Center. – 79168047
- Lea, Tom (illustrations and interviews), Rebecca McDowell Craver and Adair Margo, (1995). – Tom Lea: An Oral History. – El Paso, Texas: Texas Western Press. – ISBN 978-0-87404-234-4
- Lea, Tom (illustrations), and Kathleen G Hjerter, (1989). – The Art of Tom Lea. – College Station, Texas: Texas A & M University Press. – ISBN 978-0-89096-366-1

2003: "A Memorial Edition". – College Station: Texas A&M University Press. – ISBN 978-1-58544-282-9

- Lea, Tom (illustrations), and Brendan M Greeley, (2008). – The Two Thousand Yard Stare: Tom Lea's World War II. – College Station, Texas: Texas A&M University Press. – ISBN 978-1-60344-008-0
