= Steve Moore (playwright) =

American playwright

Steve Moore is an American playwright born in Chicago, Illinois. He attended the University of Chicago where he majored in Classics, and received an MFA in Playwriting from the Michener Center for Writers at the University of Texas at Austin.

After graduating, he moved to Austin, Texas and, along with a few fellow theatre-savvy friends, created the Physical Plant Theatre Company. Since its beginnings, Moore has written the majority of the company's plays, receiving vast praise from Austin theatre and arts critics.

== Selected stage plays ==
In 2006, his play Not Clown enjoyed an Off-Broadway run to positive reviews from The New York Times.

Later that year, Physical Plant teamed up with St. Edward's University to present Kneeling Down At Noon (2006), an original play that explores Islam through the lives of a handful of Muslims struggling to find, share, and live their daily faith and through the relationship each character has to that faith.
