= C. W. Smith (writer) =

Writer

C. W. Smith (born 1940) is an American novelist, short-story writer and essayist who worked earlier in his career as a newspaper reporter and film critic. From 1980 to 2012 he was a professor in the Department of English at Southern Methodist University, holding the Dedman Family Distinguished Professor chair from 2006, and is now professor emeritus there.Over a career spanning ten novels, Smith has written primarily about the American Southwest, often drawing on his own background in the oil towns of West Texas and New Mexico. His most recent novel, Girl Flees Circus, was published in 2022 and returns to the small-town oil country of his childhood in Hobbs, New Mexico.His major honors include a Dobie Paisano Fellowship from the University of Texas, a number of awards and recognitions from the Texas Institute of Letters (TIL), including Jesse Jones Awards for best novel by a Texan or about Texas on two separate occasions, the Kay Cattarulla Award for Best Short Story, and a Lon Tinkle Fellow for "sustained excellence in a career," an award that has previously recognized such writers as Naomi Shihab Nye, Sandra Cisneros, Donald Barthelme, Larry McMurtry, and many other prominent Texas writers. Smith has also been the recipient of two Creative Writing fellowships from the National Endowment for the Arts.

== Early life and work ==
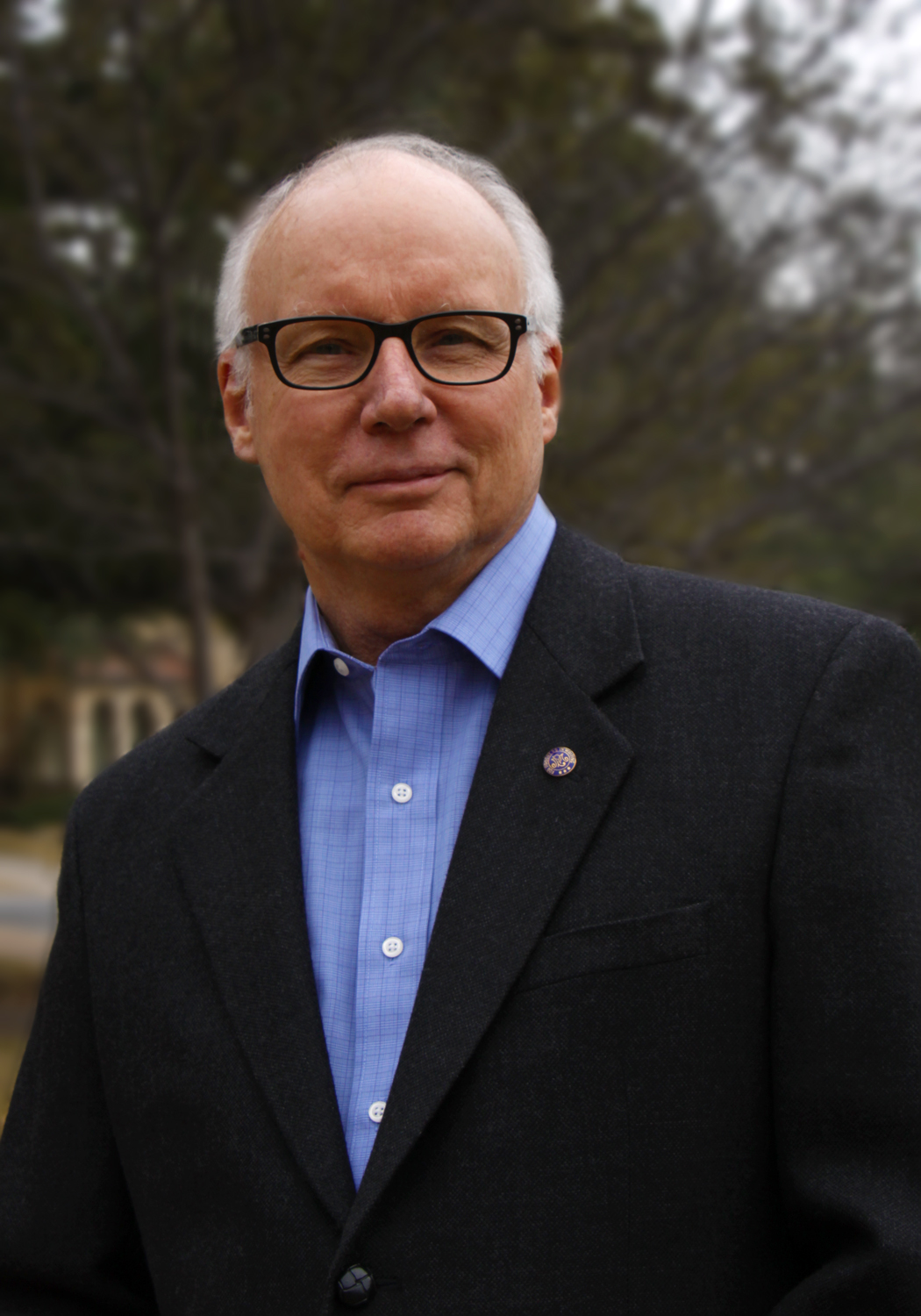
C.W. Smith

C. W. Smith (full name Charles William Smith) was born in Corpus Christi, Texas, and grew up in Hobbs, New Mexico, and oil town 12 miles from the Texas border. His father, William, worked for Gulf Oil as an engineer, and the family moved a number of times for his work before settling in Hobbs. Smith told journalist Sean Mitchell in 2022 that his childhood was a happy one, describing himself as growing up with other "free-range kids" in the oil camp of his hometown.

"I just accepted it for what it was," Charlie says about the oil industry of his youth. "Everybody I knew, their parents worked for oil companies. I never questioned it really." In the summers of high school and college, he worked as a roustabout on the oil fields, gaining hands-on experience he would later put to good use in his books, including this one.

Smith went on to receive a B.A. in English from the University of North Texas in 1964 and an M.A. in English from Northern Illinois University in 1967. After teaching at Southwest Missouri State University, he moved to Mexico for a year to work on his first novel, Thin Men of Haddam. Published by Viking/Grossman in 1973, the book was the first of two of Smith's works to win the Jesse H. Jones Award from the Texas Institute of Letters for the Best Novel by a Texan or about Texas and was recognized by the Southwestern Library Association for making a "distinguished contribution to an understanding of a vital social issue in the American Southwest".

== Career ==
Smith has said that his goal since beginning his first novel has been "to document in a dramatic fashion the cultural conflicts of the American Southwest as well as the universal, existential dilemmas that arise from being human regardless of place and time." In pursuit of that goal, his second novel, Country Music (Farrar, Straus & Giroux, 1975) is set in West Texas among oil field workers and small-town citizens, portraying the lives of young people trapped in circumstances too small for their aspirations. It was reviewed widely with largely, though not universally, positive notices and optioned by Playboy Productions.

"Smith's portrait of a troubled young man searching for himself he knows not where...is alive, funny, sad, and as real as it can be." "The characters are convincing. The pace is unusually fast for a psychological novel. Smith is a writer of growing importance." "C.W. Smith's technique has the impact of that of Claude Simon, the Provençal farmer-novelist who creates arresting amalgams of past, present, reverie and locale. Can't do much better than that. The New Yorker, on the other hand, posted that "This novel is easy to enjoy on a cartoon level, but only on that level..."

Smith was awarded a Dobie-Paisano Fellowship by the University of Texas in 1974, where he spent a year working on short stories. He was then hired to adapt the novel to the screen and spend time in Los Angeles working with producers on a script while his family resettled in Indianapolis. When the family returned to Texas, Smith became a reporter and film critic for The Dallas Times-Herald and subsequently began teaching at Southern Methodist University. His third novel, The Vestal Virgin Room (Atheneum, 1983), focused on a pair of married itinerant musicians, Mid-Westerners, whose efforts to secure fame in Las Vegas results in a strain in a marriage already under stress due to the loss of their only child. The novel was optioned by three different producers with three different scripts, one by playwright Jonathan Tolins ("The Twilight of the Golds"), and the latest by producer Ed Bates with a screenplay by playwright and screenwriter David Dean Bottrell ("Dearly Departed").

Smith then embarked upon a long historical novel based loosely upon the life of an Osage citizen who was called in the press in the 1920s and 1930s "the world's richest Indian." Buffalo Nickel was published in 1989 by Simon & Schuster after nearly a decade of writing and revision. "The destruction of native American cultures might be considered by some readers to be a literary dry hole. But this novel, about a Kiowa man who inadvertently becomes an Oklahoma oil millionaire, is a rich gusher of a novel - and consequently disproves any such notions.... This is a big novel, in all senses - the characters and the incidents of their lives made memorably real." "Critic Bruce Allen, writing in USA Today, said that "Buffalo Nickel is a delightful rarity: an old-fashioned 'good read' which tells the life story of a likable and interesting character who truly grows and changes.... The novel is a roomy, agreeably slow-paced picaresque whose serious themes (the abrading of Indian culture, the gradual disappearance of space and wilderness) emerge with haunting clarity from a prose that continuously suggests and dramatizes, never once breaking into sermon. Buffalo Nickel may well be the year's best novel."

During the 1980s and 1990s, Smith wrote non-fiction as well as novels and short stories. He was, briefly, the ethics columnist for Esquire and the film critic for Texas Monthly. As a freelance journalist and essayist, his work appeared in magazines and periodicals, both scholarly and commercial. A cover article entitled "Uncle Dad" published by Esquire became a full-length memoir about his efforts to remain a part of his children's lives after a divorce. The book, commissioned and published by Putnam, was also released under the author's original title in a subsequent paperback edition by Berkley. His nonfiction work has been recognized through various awards: Penney-Missouri Special Merit Award for Feature Writing; the Stanley Walker Award for Journalism from the Texas Institute of Letters, and the award for Best Nonfiction Book by a Texan in 1987 from the Southwestern Booksellers Association.

In 1994, Texas Christian University Press began its long association with Smith's works through the publication of his short-story collection, Letters From the Horse Latitudes. Most of the stories in the collection were previously published, and his short fiction has appeared in Mademoiselle, Vision, Southwest Review, Sunstone Review, Carolina Quarterly, New Mexico Humanities Review, Quartet, Cimarron Review, American Literary Review, American Short Fiction, The Missouri Review, and descant. Writing about the collection in The New York Times, Benjamin Cheever said, "Set in Mexico and the American Southwest, Mr. Smith's stories have a rugged informality. Their sense of intimacy is so great that the reader feels he has uncovered a cache of personal letters or is overhearing a late-night conversation between friends. And yet, like the stories of O. Henry, each is cleverly contrived to capture some essence of life and also to make a point. Today, most O. Henry stories read like antiques, dependent for their effects on credulous readers and illuminated with false optimism. But the world that Mr. Smith dramatizes is both contemporary and convincing." His stories have received the Frank O'Connor Memorial Short Story Award from Quartet; the John H. McGinnis Short Story Award from Southwest Review, as well as a Pushcart Prize nomination. An excerpt from his story "The Plantation Club" was included in, "Seeing Jazz: Artists and Writers on Jazz," published by Chronicle Books in the Smithsonian Institution Traveling Exhibition Service (1997). His short story, "The Bundelays," was performed by Judith Ivey as part of the Dallas Museum of Arts' "Arts and Letters Live Series," as well as at sister programs in Denver and Houston.

Smith's next novel, Hunter's Trap (TCU Press, 1996), was designed to be an oblique sequel to the earlier Buffalo Nickel and the second part of a projected trilogy treating the theme of Native American assimilation into Anglo-European culture after the defeat of the Plains tribes by the U.S. military in the last quarter of the 19th century. "Somewhat reminiscent of the stories of Jim Harrison...Smith's novel offers an evocative exploration of the values and character of a time, a place, and a man. It's also a novel that would grace the lists of fine trade publishers, but refreshingly, it comes to us from a university press. Here's hoping that many readers come to know this skillfully wrought tale and that its success encourages TCU Press to bring us more such books." (Booklist) "It's an eye for an eye - obsessive hatred, relentless pursuit and coldblooded revenge for irrevocable loss - in this hypnotic sequel to Smith's highly-praised western, Buffalo Nickel....The plot...moves inexorably to a stunning irony on the final page." "Beautifully bitter Depression-era revenge melodrama in which good guys lose, good women die, and virtue's reward is unreasonable tragedy."

Smith returned to more contemporary settings in his subsequent novel, Understanding Women (TCU Press, 1998), a coming-of-age story that takes place in the late 1950s when its sixteen-year-old protagonist and narrator leaves his home in Dallas to spend a summer working for his uncle in the oil fields. The novel won the Jesse H. Jones Award from the Texas Institute of Letters from the Best Novel of 1998 by a Texan or about Texas and also received an award from the Border Regional Library Association as an "Outstanding Book About the Southwest," and the book garnered a starred review in Booklist.

== Work since 2000 ==
Gabriel's Eye (Winedale Publishing, 2001) utilizes Smith's intimate knowledge of contemporary Dallas to focus upon the affair between a female teacher and her student at a local performing arts high school. While the book did secure mild praise from a reviewer in Publishers Weekly, it went largely unnoticed in the press, although the Austin Chronicle gave it a full-length, somewhat mixed review.

Smith once again embarked upon unearthing historical records to produce a lengthy tome based on the riots of 1943 in Beaumont, Texas, when war-time social and living conditions produced racial tension that flared into violent civil disorder when an African-American was falsely accused of raping the wife of an overseas sailor. The book, Purple Hearts (TCU Press, 2008) took seven years to write and went through thirteen drafts to reach its final form. Again, as was the case with his previous novel, the work went unnoticed, though scholar and critic Clay Reynolds has written fully of it. (See below.) The novel was a 2009 finalist for Best Novel award given by the Writers' League of Texas. His short story "Caustic" (Southwest Review, Summer 2010) was given The Kay Catarulla Award for "best short story of 2010" by The Texas Institute of Letters.

Smith's next novel, Steplings, was published in September 2011 by TCU Press. The novel is a coming-of-age story for a young man from a Dallas blue-collar suburb who allows his eleven-year-old stepsister to run away with him, setting off an Amber Alert that divides their newly married parents. Early reviews ran from mixed to very positive: "Slow, a little weak in the plot department, but rich in psychological insight and lit by occasional flashes of humor"; the two characters "make page-turning strides toward responsibility and maturity as they learn what an awesome task it is to take responsibility for each other";"Texas novelist C.W. Smith has received just about every literary award the state and region bestow, and his latest work, the sprightly and wise Steplings, will no doubt add to his reputation as a Lone Star star.... Steplings comes to a completely realistic, bittersweet conclusion that will disappoint readers who like their endings tied in neat bows. But Smith is no fantasist — he's a writer who can be depended on to write life as he actually sees it, not as he (or we) might wish it were"; "Even though these kinds of relationship dynamics have been mined many times before, Smith's story rings true and never feels stale. A dash of international politics spices up the personal politics of Steplings in a way that isn't forced or incongruent. The only misstep is a brief glimpse into the life of Jason's girlfriend that reads like a long parenthetical to the real story – a story of bonds between siblings and spouses, parents and children, and the fallout when they pull in different directions".

Smith's latest book is Girl Flees Circus (University of New Mexico Press, 2022), a picaresque novel, set in the late 1920s, that follows a woman aviator's adventures after she steals her circus plane and crash-lands in a small New Mexico town on the verge of an oil discovery. Publishers Weekly offered a mixed review, crediting Smith for "a rousing if overstuffed story" with "a squadrom of great characters."

== Works ==
=== Novels ===
- Thin Men of Haddam. New York: Viking/Grossman, 1973. Paperback reprint by Avon, 1975. Reprint by Texas Christian University Press as No. 15 in The Texas Tradition Series, 1990, with Introduction by the author and Afterword by series editor James Ward Lee. Audio edition by Recorded Books, Inc., read by Robert Ramirez in Lone Star Audio series, 2004.
- Country Music. New York: Farrar, Straus & Giroux, 1975. Paperback reprint by Ballantine Books, 1976.
- The Vestal Virgin Room. New York: Atheneum, 1983.
- Buffalo Nickel. New York: Simon & Schuster/Poseidon, 1989. Paperback reprint editions by Pocket Books, 1990 & 1995.
- Hunter's Trap. Fort Worth: Texas Christian University Press, 1996. Paperback reprint TCU Press, 1996. Audio edition narrated by Kenny Rahmeyer, 2002, Texas State Library & Archives Commission Talking Book Program.
- Understanding Women. Fort Worth: TCU Press, 1998.
- Gabriel's Eye. Houston: Winedale Publishing, 2001.
- Purple Hearts. Fort Worth: TCU Press, 2008.
- Steplings. Fort Worth: TCU Press, 2011.
- Girl Flees Circus, University of New Mexico Press, 2022

=== Short story collection ===
- Letters From the Horse Latitudes. Fort Worth: TCU Press, 1994.

=== Memoir ===
- Uncle Dad. New York: Putnam/Berkley, 1989.

=== Selected essays ===
- "Structural and Thematic Unity in Gascoigne's The Adventures of Master F.J.," in Papers on Language and Literature, Vol. II #2 (Spring, 1966), pp. 99–108.
- "Dallas: The Urge for Cosmetic Surgery," in The Texas Humanist, Vol. 6 #3 (January/February, 1984), p. 14.
- "Pumping Iron: When Man and Shirt Are Caught in Steamy Combat," in Esquire (March 1984), pp. 96–97. Reprinted in the Eastern Review and in Writing From Start To Finish, edited by Jeffrey L. Duncan (Harcourt, Brace and Jovanovitch, 1985), pp. 357–359.
- "Uncle Dad -- Fathering at a Distance," in Esquire, March 1985, cover story. Reprinted in Single Parent, the Journal of Parents Without Partners, (November/December, 1986), p. 15; The Utne Reader (No. 9, April/May 1985), pp. 46 – 53; Australian Weekend News Limited, (March 1985, syndicated through U.S. Bureau of News and Times Newspapers); The Fathers' Book: Shared Experiences, eds. Carol Kort and Ronnie Friedland (G.K. Hall, 1986); Reading For College Writers, eds. Lawrence Behrens and Leonard Rosen (Little Brown, February, 1987); Writer's Circle, St. Martin's Press; The Denver Post, Toronto Sun, Los Angeles Herald-Examiner, San Jose Mercury News, Colorado Springs Gazette Telegraph, Chicago Sun-Times, and the Boston Herald (syndicated through News America Syndicate).
- "The Myth of the Good Life in Texas," in Texas Myths, ed. Robert O'Connor. Published by Texas A & M Press in conjunction with the Texas Committee for the Humanities, 1986, pp. 185 –204.
- "Look Back in Anger," Esquire (May 1986), (pp. 43–45.)
- "Les Miserables," Texas Monthly (August 1994), pp. 38–40.
- "A Comedy of Manners," Hemispheres (February 1995), pp. 123–128.
- "A Meditation on Stone," Texas Architect, (Volume 45, #4, 1995), pp. 54–59.
- "Translating 'The French Lieutenant's Woman'" in the metamorphses forum of the PEN American Center Journal. (#6 Spring, 2005). https://web.archive.org/web/20110417043520/http://pen.org/page.php/prmID/602

== Interviews ==
=== Print ===
- C.W. Smith Has Yet to Write a Bestseller. He's Fine with That." by Sean Mitchell, D Magazine (September 19, 2022).
- "Writer Passes Along Art of His Craft to Students," by Lisa Castello. SMU Magazine (Fall/Winter, 2001), pp. 26–27.
- "The Heartbreak in Becoming 'Uncle Dad,'" by Michael Robertson. San Francisco Chronicle (Tues. June 2, 1987).
- "Texas Writers: As schoolboy, Smith laughed at Shakespeare," by Nanette Fodell DeCreny. Houston Post (April 18, 1981).
- "Unfinished Business Takes Up Novelist's Mornings," by Elizabeth Bennett. Houston Post (Sun., December 12, 1982), p. 18F
- "Smith Objects to 'Regional Writer' Label and New Novel Supports Him," by Susan Wood. Houston Chronicle (Sun., July 20, 1975), p. 12

=== Video ===
- 'Steplings book trailer (2011)
- "Conversations With Pam Lange," featuring C.W. Smith and his novel Purple Hearts. Irving Community TV (May 5, 2008).
- Live segment on Good Morning America with Charles Gibson, ABC-TV 1965 Broadway, New York, NY, (May 18, 1987).
