= Stephen Harrigan =

American journalist

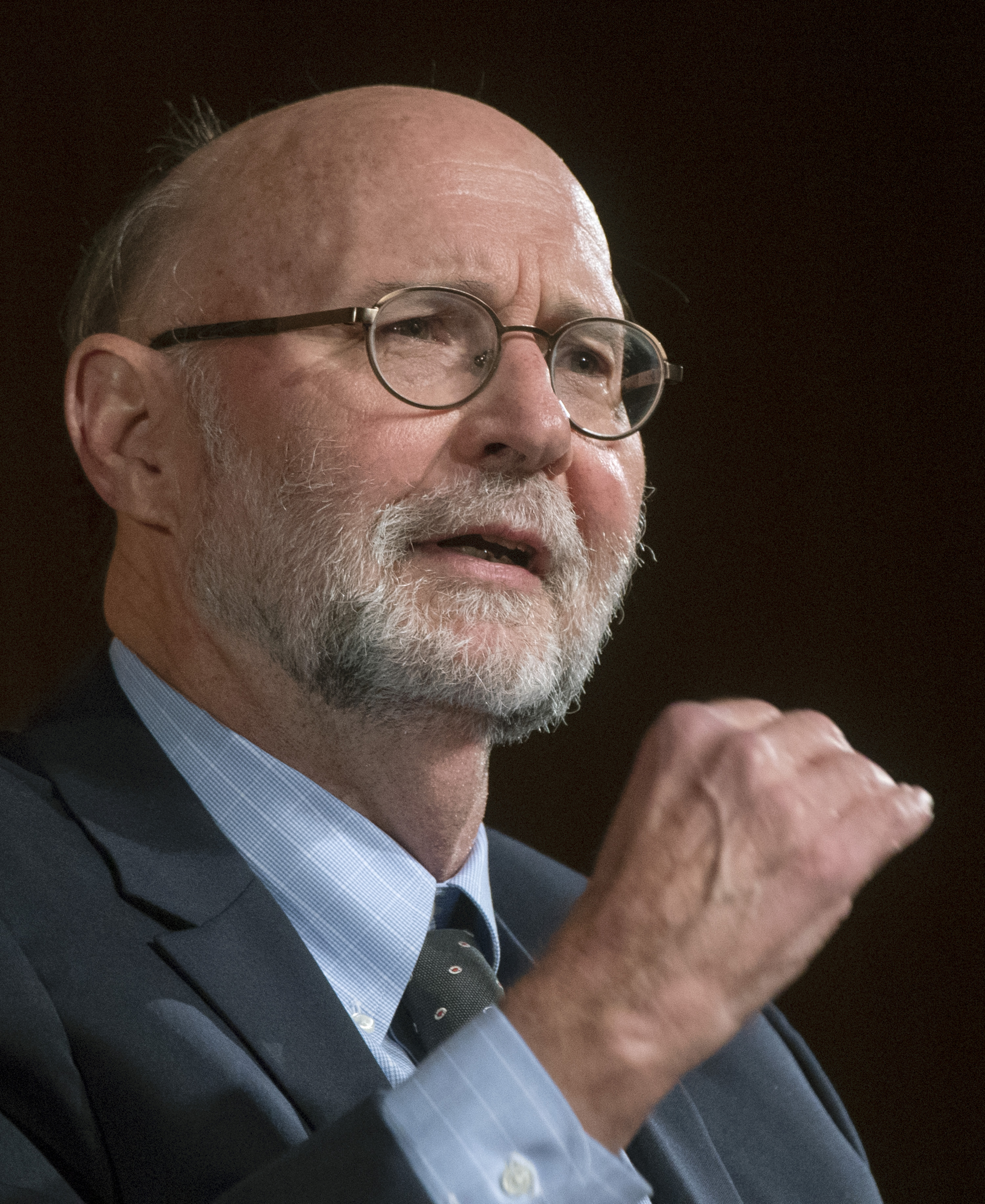
- Born: 1948 (age 77–78); Oklahoma City, Oklahoma, U.S.
- Education: University of Texas at Austin
- Occupation: Writer
- Writing career
- Genres: Novelist, screenwriter
- Notable awards: Spur Award James Fenimore Cooper Award

Stephen Harrigan (born 1948) is an American novelist, journalist and screenwriter. He is best known as the author of the bestselling The Gates of the Alamo, for other novels such as Remember Ben Clayton and A Friend of Mr. Lincoln, and for his magazine work in Texas Monthly.

== Life ==
He was born in Oklahoma City in 1948 as Michael Stephen McLaughlin, the second son of Marjorie Berney McLaughlin, an Army nurse, and of James Erwin McLaughlin, a decorated fighter pilot in World War II who was killed in a plane crash on Mt. Pilchuck northeast of Seattle six months before Harrigan was born. When he was five, his mother married Tom Harrigan, a Texas-based independent oilman. The family moved to Abilene, and then to Corpus Christi. Stephen Harrigan graduated from the University of Texas at Austin in 1971 and—after several years working as a yardman—began writing for the newly established magazine Texas Monthly and launched his career as a freelance writer. His articles and essays have appeared there and in a wide variety of other magazines, including Outside, Esquire, The New York Times Book Review, National Geographic, American History, The Wall Street Journal, and Slate.

== Publishing career ==
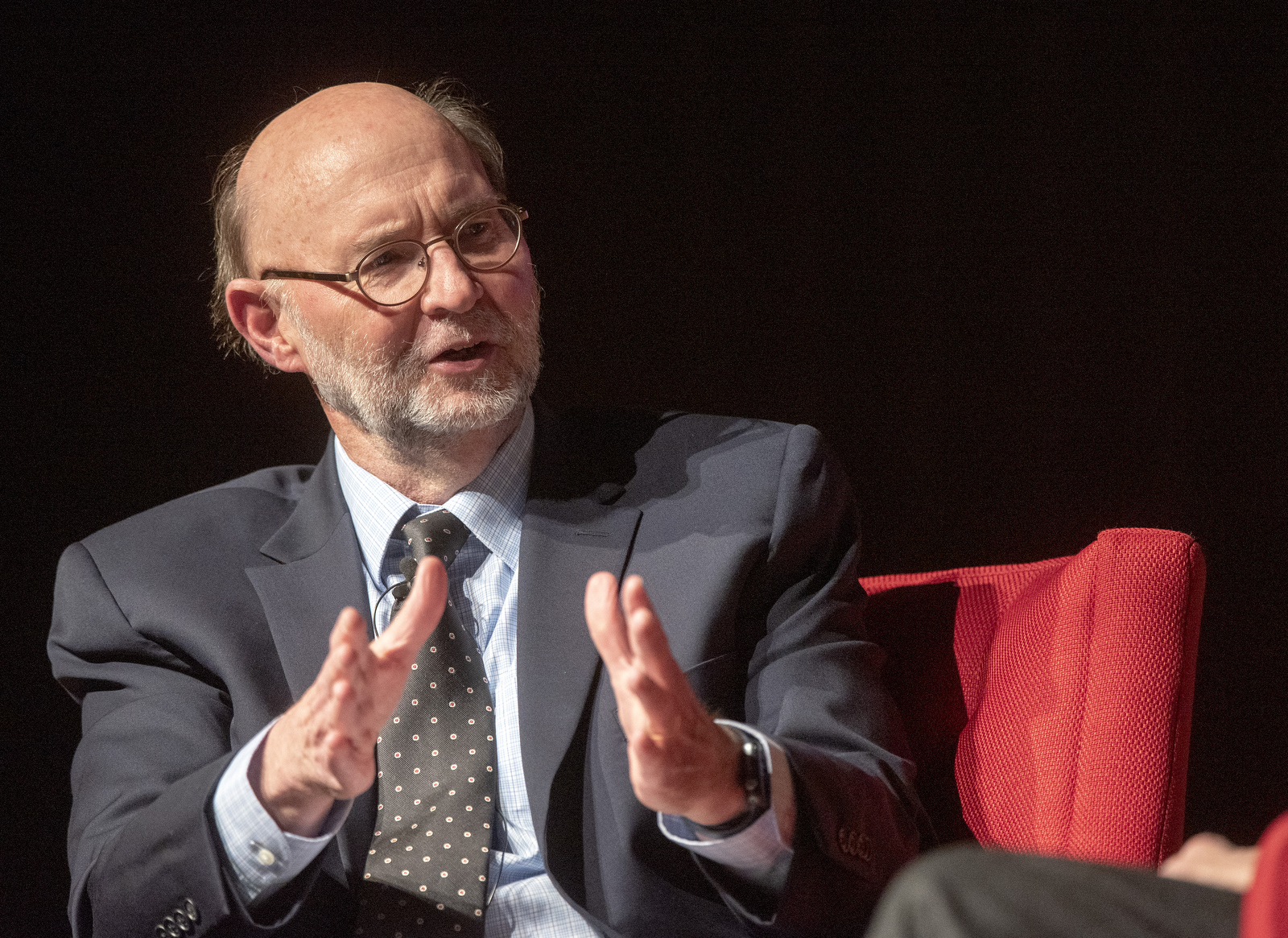
Harrigan at the LBJ Presidential Library in 2019

Harrigan's novel, The Gates of the Alamo, published in 2000, was a New York Times bestseller and the recipient of a number of awards, including the TCU Texas Book Award, the Western Heritage Award from the National Cowboy and Western Heritage Museum and the Spur Award for Best Novel of the West from the Western Writers of America. His 2011 novel Remember Ben Clayton also won the Spur Award, as well as the Jesse H. Jones Award from the Texas Institute of Letters and the James Fenimore Cooper Prize from the Society of American Historians for best historical novel. His latest novel is A Friend of Mr. Lincoln, a work of fiction centering on Abraham Lincoln's early career as a lawyer and state legislator in Springfield, Illinois. A starred review in Publishers Weekly hailed the book as “superb” and, in the judgment of Pulitzer Prize winning historian Joseph J. Ellis, it is “historical fiction at its very best.” He has recently finished a sweeping history of Texas, from prehistory to the present, entitled "Big Wonderful Thing". It is already a bestseller on Amazon.

== Screenwriting career ==
Stephen Harrigan has also been a prolific screenwriter, principally in the field of made-for-television movies, a career he recounted in a Slate essay titled "I Was an A-List Writer of B-List Productions." Among the films he has written are The Last of His Tribe (HBO), Beyond the Prairie: The True Story of Laura Ingalls Wilder (CBS), King of Texas (TNT) and The Colt (The Hallmark Channel.) He worked with Robert Altman on a feature version of S. R. Bindler's documentary, Hands on a Hard Body, about an endurance contest to win a pickup truck. Altman was in pre-production on the movie at the time of his death in November 2006. More recently, he has collaborated with William Broyles Jr. on a screenplay based on Conn Igulden's series of novels about Julius Caesar. That project is in development with Exclusive Media. Robert Duvall optioned—as producer and star—another screenplay, The Which Way Tree, based on the novel by Elizabeth Crook. Harrigan and Crook co-wrote the screenplay.

== Personal life ==
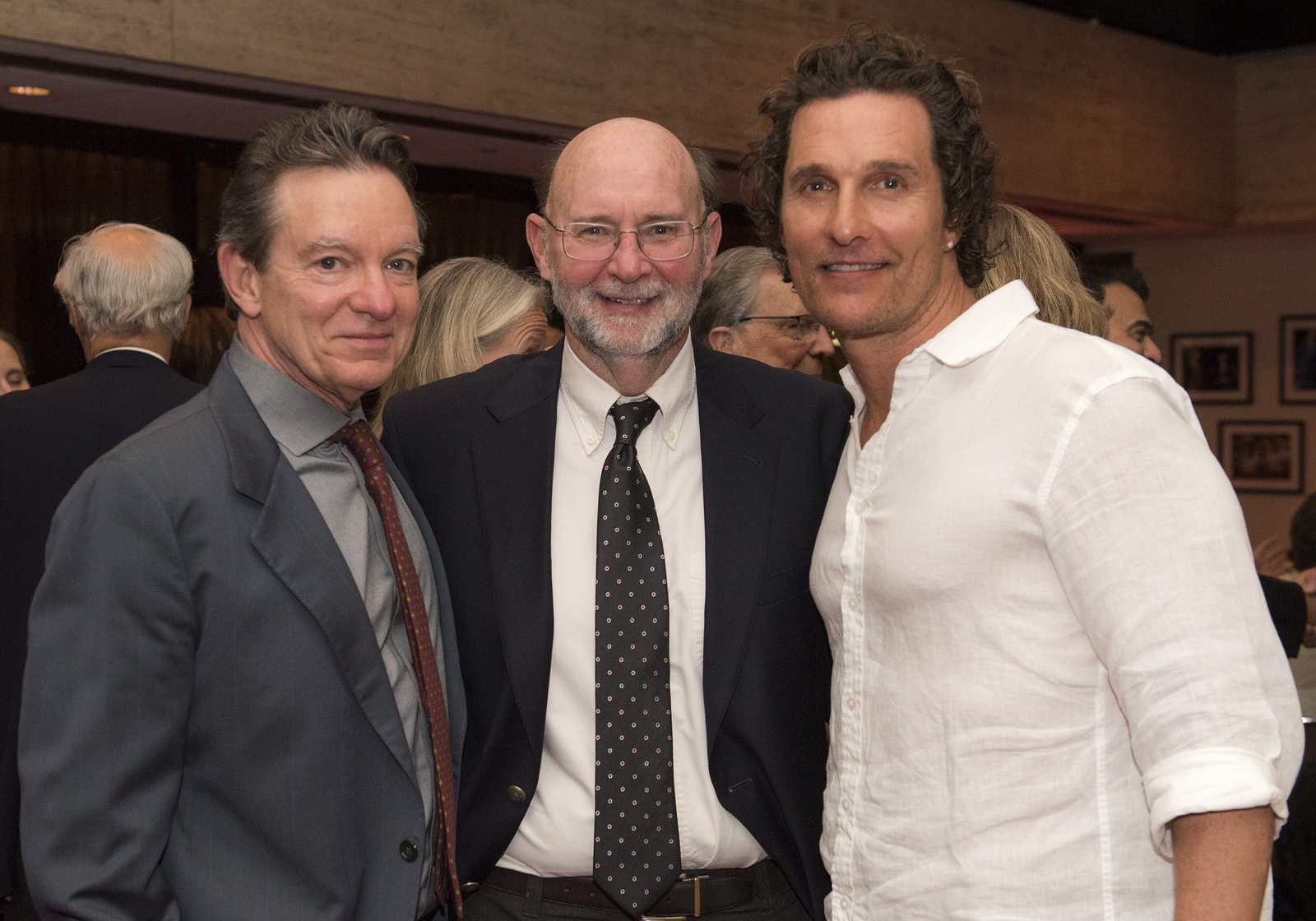
(L-R) Lawrence Wright, Harrigan and Matthew McConaughey at the LBJ Presidential Library in 2018

Harrigan and his wife Sue Ellen live in Austin, Texas. They have three daughters and five grandchildren. For twenty years, he taught creative writing in the MFA program at the Michener Center for Writers at the University of Texas at Austin. He is a founding member of Capital Area Statues, Inc., an organization that raises money for public monuments that celebrate the history and culture of Texas. He was inducted into the Texas Literary Hall of Fame and has won lifetime achievement awards from the Texas Book Festival and the Texas Institute of Letters.

== Works ==
=== Novels ===
- Aransas (1980)
- Jacob's Well (1984)
- The Gates of the Alamo (2000)
- Challenger Park (2006)
- Remember Ben Clayton (2011)
- A Friend of Mr. Lincoln (2016)
- The Leopard Is Loose (2022)

=== Non-fiction ===
- Water and Light: A Diver's Journey to a Coral Reef (1992)
- They Came from the Sky (preview of a forthcoming Texas history) (2017)
- Big Wonderful Thing: A History of Texas (2019)

=== Essays ===
- A Natural State (1988)
- Comanche Midnight (1995)
- The Eye of the Mammoth (2013)
- An Anchor in the Sea of Time (2025)
