= Robert Flynn (author) =

American writer

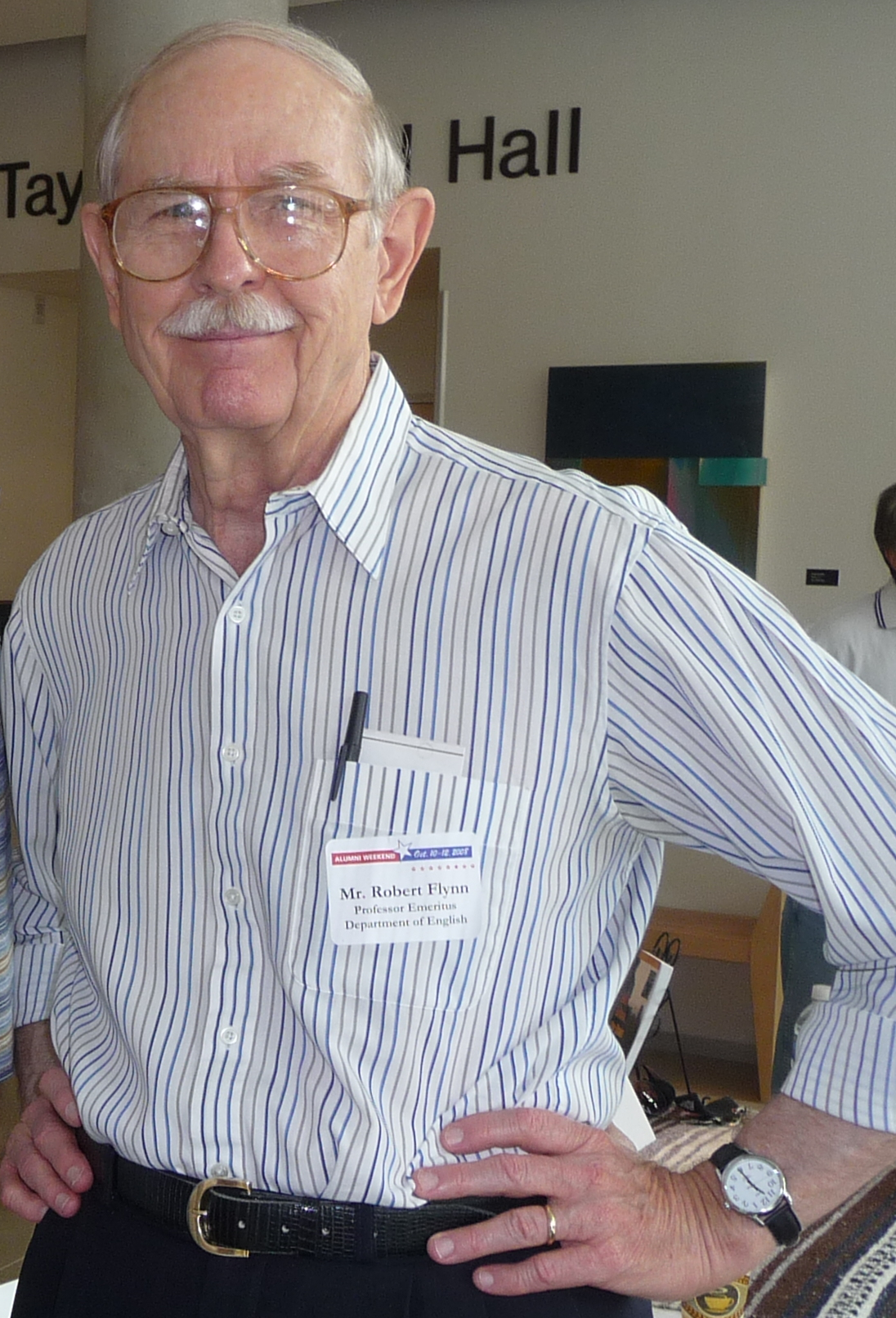
- Flynn in 2008
- Born: Robert Lopez Flynn; April 12, 1932 (age 94); Chillicothe, Texas, U.S.
- Education: Baylor University
- Occupation: Novelist
- Spouse: Jean Flynn
- Writing career
- Genres: Texas literature, Western fiction, satire
- Subjects: Texas, war, religion
- Notable work: North To Yesterday
- Website: robert-flynn.net

Robert Flynn (né Robert Lopez Flynn; born 12 April 1932, in Chillicothe, Texas) is an author and professor emeritus at Trinity University.

== Early life and education ==
In a 2012 interview, Flynn said that his father asked him to keep a diary during his military service in South Korea. Flynn did that every night and realized that "I liked examining my life." At Baylor, Flynn was encouraged by drama teacher Paul Baker who praised his writing and selected two of Flynn's plays to be performed.

Flynn graduated from Baylor University in 1954 with a degree in drama. He taught speech and drama for two years at Garden-Webb College and returned to Baylor to teach in the drama department as assistant professor. After the department chair (Paul Baker) had a falling out with Baylor University, Flynn left with Paul Baker to teach drama at Trinity University in San Antonio.

In 1964, Flynn wrote a stage adaptation of Faulkner's As I Lay Dying, titled "Journey to Jefferson" for Dallas Theater Center Production (which was directed by Paul Baker). This production won a Special Jury Award at the Theater of Nations in Paris in 1964. A review in the New York Times offered this description of the play: "The macabre tone of some incidents in the story mixes strangely with the comedy scenes that were played for laughs rather than wry smiles, and the self-conscious borrowings from the oriental theater stick out a mile from an otherwise realistic production."

== Military Service and Writing ==
Flynn interrupted his college study to join the Marines where he served for two years during the Korea War era. Later, in 1970, he left Trinity to work as a war correspondent with True Magazine in Vietnam. During that time Flynn was embedded with Golf Company, 2nd Battalion, 5th Marines as a civilian war correspondent for two months. These experiences helped him to write a memoir A Personal War in Vietnam (1989) and a 1994 novel The Last Klick. "...(B)ecause it comes out of a contemporary sensibility," Saul Bellow wrote, (the 'Last Klick') presents a greater challenge to the feelings. The madness of jungle warfare is matched moreover by the wicked idiocy of press and television." Another critic wrote that "The Virtue of The Last Klick is found in its insider's view of the machinations of the men and women of the wartime press corps who covered the Vietnam conflict."

== Styles and themes ==
Flynn gained early recognition with his novel North to Yesterday, a national bestseller which both satirizes and pays tribute to traditional cowboy mythology in Western literature. When he sent the manuscript to Knopf (which eventually published it), he included a cover letter explaining that the story was no more a western than “Don Quixote” was a western. Winfred Blevins described the novel as "an eloquent, robust, inventive, crazily comic and richly humane work of fiction." John Barsness writes "Mr. Flynn sends (his characters) through a series of sometimes uproariously funny adventures which, while never dislodging the myth itself, bravely and righteously lampoon those who still believe in that heroic interpretation of the Western frontier."

Flynn's later novels address themes such as rural life, war, religion in contemporary society, and the tension between traditional values and popular culture.

About Flynn's 1969 novel In the House of the Lord, Judyth Rigler wrote, "Flynn, himself an ordained minister, has a great deal to say in this book about the flaws of organized religion, and he chose a wonderful character to carry the plot." Wanderer Springs adopted the gently satirical tone of his earlier works while also examining the interconnectedness between people and families in a small Texas town. Diane McWhorter wrote that "the hometown lives he re-encounters, plain and Gothic as country music, particularize grand American themes, from manifest destiny to Vietnam..." Flynn's 2001 novel Tie-Fast Country returns to earlier themes, depicting a grandmother rancher with a checkered past who is out of sync with contemporary life. (The narrator is a TV news producer who has to confront her).

Calling Flynn's 1995 Living with the Hyenas as "possibly the best collection of short fiction to come out of this region in years," critic Clay Reynolds wrote, "Flynn may be the best-kept secret in Texas. His style, gentle and compact, always seems to evoke the mystique of being exceptionally normal and of attempting to adapt that normalcy to the most abnormal situations..... He reminds me often of Katherine Anne Porter at her best, yet there is still a remarkable singularity about each of Flynn's renderings. There are no wasted words anywhere, and at the same time, after reading one of these stories, one has the sense of having enjoyed and been overwhelmed by a much longer work."

In 2010 and 2011, Flynn published two novels through JoSara MeDia, Jade:Outlaw and its sequel, Jade: the Law. Both novels portray the grim realities of living in west Texas in the late 19th century where settlers/Indians/Mexicans frequently clash. Jade, the protagonist, is hired as an escort for cattle, guarding property and chasing after rustlers. He quickly discovers that just to do his job means getting involved in brutal situations that trouble his conscience. Jade ends up falling in love with Crow Poison, an Indian woman whose husband he had killed. Eventually he realizes that both sides have culpability. His outrage translates into a desire to fight for the sake of justice (even if it results in tragedy). At the end of the novel, Jade (with the support of his wife) agrees to serve as sheriff for his town (which becomes the basis for the sequel, Jade: The Law).

San Antonio Express-News reviewer Ed Conroy wrote, “Flynn brilliantly employs a directly simple, subtle and at times sardonic narrative voice...Flynn brilliantly employs a directly simple, subtle and at times sardonic narrative voice to tell this tale. It is alternately tough and tender, succinct and sweet, cadenced to the clip-clop of a horse trotting down Main Street, the hullabaloo of a steam locomotive triumphantly making its way into town amid a jubilant crowd's hoopla, and, of course, to the shots of guns of many kinds fired in self-defense, anger, treachery and haste." Another critic wrote that "the novel raises questions about what role religion can play (if any) in a society lacking order and a settled structure of governance."

Flynn taught writing to college students over four decades. In a 2007 audio interview, he said, "You can read any book on writing fiction for example, and they will tell you the same thing. Someone may say it in a different way that gives you better insight, but there are no secrets in writing; it's just a matter of doing it."

== Recognition and Accolades ==
- Texas Literary Festival award: Best Fiction work (for Seasonal Rain), 1986
- Western Heritage Award: Short Stories, 1996. (For Living with the Hyenas).
- Lon Tinkle Award for Career Excellence, 1998 (Texas Institute of Letters).,
- Induction into the Texas Literary Hall of Fame in October 2012.

== Bibliography ==
=== Novels ===
- North To Yesterday
- In the House of the Lord
- The Sounds of Rescue, The Signs of Hope
- Wanderer Springs
- The Last Klick
- The Devil's Tiger, with Dan Klepper
- Tie-Fast Country
- Jade: The Outlaw (ebook + pb) JoSara MeDia (September 1, 2010)
- Jade: The Law (ebook + pb) JoSara MeDia (October 2011)
- Antarctica: A Narrative Travel Journal, with Colin Bass. JoSara MeDia (July 2026)

=== Vietnam Memoir ===
- A Personal War In Vietnam

=== Short story collections ===
- Living with the Hyenas
- Seasonal Rain
- Slouching towards Zion

=== Essays ===
- When I was Just Your Age, oral histories, edited with Susan Russell
- Growing Up a Sullen Baptist
- Paul Baker and the Integration of Abilities

=== Religious/social essays ===
- The Most Famous Christian of the 20th century?
- For the love of Agape
