= Truddi Chase =

American writer (1935–2010)

- Born: June 13, 1935; Honeoye Falls, New York, US
- Died: March 10, 2010 (age 74); Laurel, Maryland, U.S.
- Occupation: Author
- Known for: Author of an autobiography detailing her dissociative identity disorder
- Children: Kari Iddings Ainsworth; Paul Ainsworth

Truddi Chase (June 13, 1935 – March 10, 2010) was an American author. She is best known for the book When Rabbit Howls (1987), an autobiography about her experiences after being diagnosed with dissociative identity disorder.

== Life ==
According to her own account, Chase was born on a homestead near Honeoye Falls, New York, and grew up in an apartment in the same town. In her autobiography and in numerous interviews, Chase said that she was repeatedly and violently sexually and physically abused by her stepfather and beaten and neglected by her mother during her childhood and teenage years. By her report, she had always remembered that molestation and abuse occurred from the age of two onwards but that she could not focus on details before going into therapy. According to her autobiography, Truddi Chase was not her actual birth name. At age 16, she ran away from her abusive household and changed her name to Truddi Chase to avoid being tracked down by her parents. In an interview with The Chicago Tribune, Truddi Chase described how her other personalities remained "dormant" until stressors in her midlife caused extreme anxiety, eventually unravelling all of her parts. In 1979, Truddi Chase had her first experience with her other identities. She described interactions between her many personality characters as well as interactions between her identities and physical body. It was during sessions with hypnotherapist Robert Phillips, that she found that she had 92 identities.

Chase chose not to integrate her identities into one integrated whole, and instead chose to welcome her parts into a cooperating team. In her book, she describes giving talks to convicted child molesters to explain her abuse history and to warn them of the psychological devastation that child abuse inflicts upon its victims.

In 1987, Chase published her autobiography, When Rabbit Howls, which was written from the perspective of her many identities, referred to as "the Troops for Truddi Chase". It begins with an introduction from her therapist, and then presents Chase's experience with her 92 personalities.

When promoting the book during a March 21, 1990, appearance on The Oprah Winfrey Show, Chase discussed her life with host Oprah Winfrey, including her 92 distinct personalities. Her account of her life moved Winfrey to tears. The host told Chase, "I had gone all the way into the path of truth for myself and also could relate to hers that much more readily, which is what happens when you open yourself up." Chase also stated that a Washington Post reporter had tracked down her family, including her stepfather, who denied abusing Chase, but that other members of Chase's family confirmed her story.

In 1990, the book was adapted into a two-part ABC miniseries, titled Voices Within: The Lives of Truddi Chase, which cast Shelley Long in the title role.

Truddi Chase died on March 10, 2010, at her home in Laurel, Maryland, at the age of 74.

== In media ==
Writer Grant Morrison was inspired by Chase's first memoir to co-create the DC Comics superhero Crazy Jane, which first appeared in the volume 2 of the Doom Patrol comic book series in 1989.
