= Voices Within: The Lives of Truddi Chase =

1990 film by Lamont Johnson

- Video Release
- Written by: Truddi Chase; E. Jack Neuman
- Directed by: Lamont Johnson
- Starring: Shelley Long; Tom Conti; John Rubinstein; Alan Fudge; Jamie Rose; Christine Healy; Frank Converse
- Music by: Charles Fox
- Country of origin: United States
- Original language: English

Production
- Producers: Martin Mickelson; Harry R. Sherman; Lamont Johnson
- Cinematography: William Wages
- Editor: Susan B. Browdy
- Running time: 200 minutes
- Production companies: New World Television; ItzBinso Long Productions; P.A. Productions

Original release
- Network: ABC
- Release: May 20, 1990

Voices Within: The Lives of Truddi Chase is an ABC-Network miniseries based on When Rabbit Howls, the autobiography of Truddi Chase, a woman who was diagnosed with dissociative identity disorder who had 92 separate personalities. The four-hour miniseries, which was directed by Lamont Johnson stars Emmy winner Shelley Long as Truddi Chase. Tom Conti co-stars as her doctor. The miniseries aired on May 20 and 21, 1990 and Chase worked closely with screenwriter E. Jack Neuman to assure her autobiography was adapted accurately. Voices Within also exists as a 1-hour 46 minute version.

== Plot ==
Truddi Chase phones her therapist to tell him she intends to travel to upstate New York to kill her stepfather. During her plane ride to New York, she flashes back to her traumatic childhood, which was filled with childhood sexual abuse suffered at the hands of her stepfather. To cope with the trauma, she develops dissociative identity disorder, manifesting approximately 90 split personalities over the course of her life, whom she refers to collectively as "The Troops".

As a young woman, Truddi marries a man named Norman, but their marriage is rocky as a result of Truddi's psychological issues. Her condition worsens when they have a daughter, Paige, resulting in the breakdown of her marriage. Truddi seeks assistance, eventually meeting Dr. Stanley Phillips, who seeks to integrate Truddi's numerous personalities. Eventually Truddi decides to confront her stepfather in person.

== Cast ==
- Shelley Long as Truddi Chase
- Tom Conti as Dr. Stanley Phillips
- Tiffany Ballenger as Truddi Chase at 8
- Jon Beshara as Police
- Val Bettin as Playwright
- Kelly Brookman as Page De Roin at 8
- Irina Cashen as Truddi Chase at 6
- Carl Ciarfalio as Colin
- Marian Collier as Operator
- Frank Converse as Peter Morgan
- Robert Costanzo as Fred Zarr
- Manuel DePina as Barkeep
- Brendan Dillon as Shannon
- Dale Dunham as Manager
- Susan Eisenberg as Stewardess
- David Fox-Brenton as Dr. Modarelli
- Alan Fudge as Albert Johnson
- Nancy Gormley as Airport
- John Hancock as Soloman
- Christine Healy as Sharon Barnes
- Miriam Johnson as Page De Roin at 15
- Jessie Jones as Scrub Nurse
- Guido Koock
- Melinda Kordich as Teacher
- Bennett Liss as Angry
- Ernie Lively as Paul
- Joe Minjares as Mr. DiCola
- Melinda Peterson as Nurse Daphne
- Steven M. Porter as Hayes
- Jamie Rose as Truddi's Mother
- John Rubinstein as Norman De Roin
- Benjamin L. Scott as Harry Barnes (as Ben Scott)
- Nicholas Scott as Danny
- Wesley A. Starr as Wedding Minister
- Marsha Van Winkle as Doris
- Alisha Waite as Annie
- Lisa Watson as Page De Roin at 12
- Stephanie Watson as Page De Roin at 10
- Bruce Westphal as Funeral Minister
- J.D. Yarbrough as Client
