= Texas Book Festival =

Annual book fair

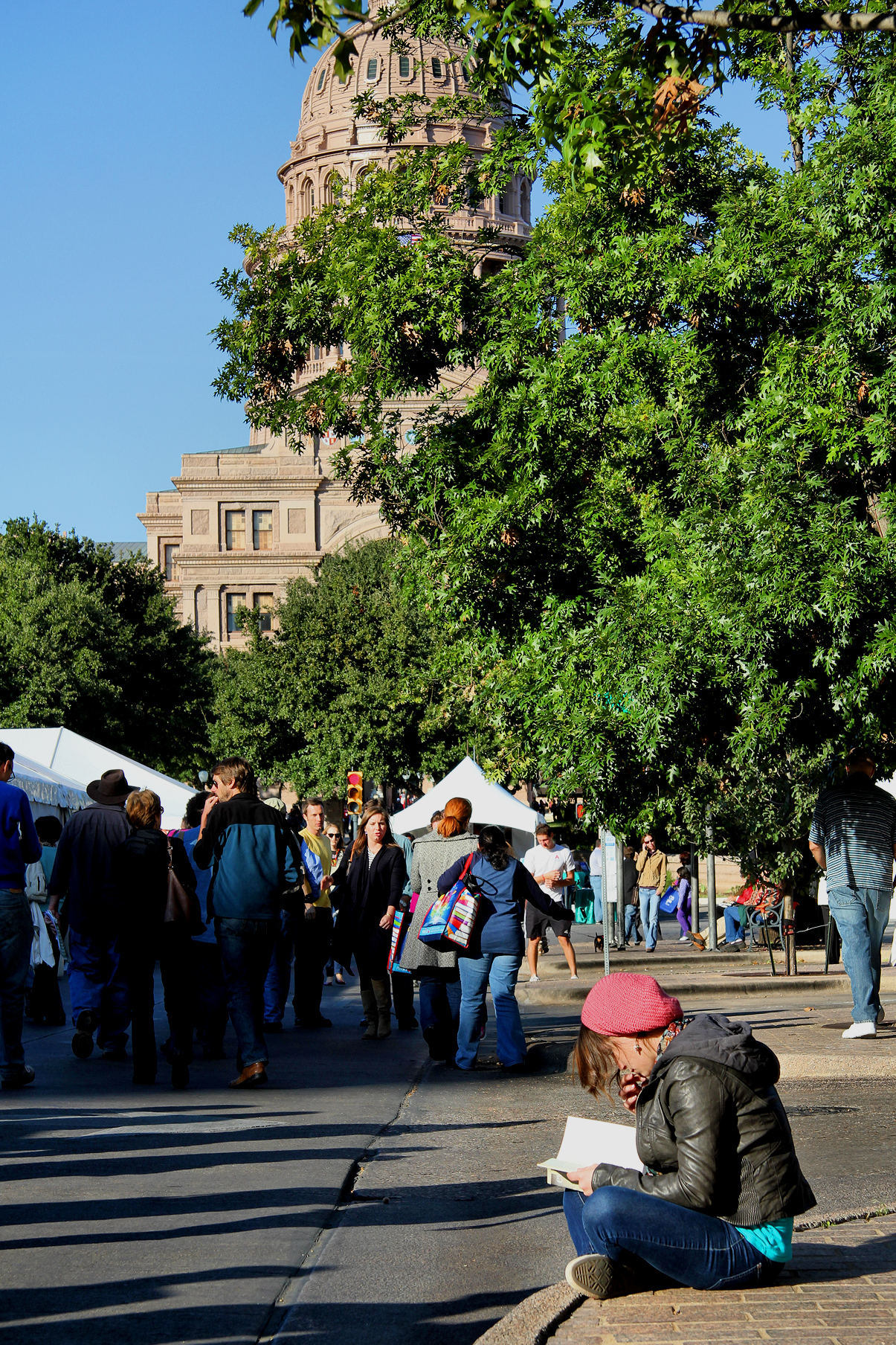
A person reading a book at the 2012 Texas Book Festival

The Texas Book Festival is a free annual book festival held in downtown Austin, Texas. The festival takes place each fall in October or November and includes programming for children and adults. It is one of the largest and most critically acclaimed book festivals in the United States.

In addition to the annual book festival, Texas Book Festival — a 501(c)(3) non-profit — organizes year-round literary programming and community outreach programs. This includes library grants to public libraries across Texas and author visits with book donations to Title I schools through its Reading Rock Stars and Real Reads programs.

Since the inception of the Reading Rock Stars and Real Reads programs, the Texas Book Festival has donated more than 166,000 books to students in Title I schools and provided more than 757 author visits.

As an organization, Texas Book Festival aims to inspire Texans of all ages to love reading through its mission to connect authors and readers through experiences that celebrate the culture of literacy, ideas, and imagination.

== Beginnings ==
The festival was established in 1995 by Laura Bush, then the First Lady of Texas, and Mary Margaret Farabee, wife of former State Senator Ray Farabee with support of Robert S. Martin, then Director and Librarian of the Texas State Library and Archives Commission. The festival was initially created to benefit the state's public library system, promote the joy of reading, and honor Texas authors. The first festival took place at the Texas State Capitol in November 1996.

== Expansion ==
Since then, the festival has greatly expanded, attracting major bestsellers and award-winners.

With the assistance of Honorary Chairman and librarian, Mrs. Bush, and a task force, the festival has grown, hosting more than 2,000 authors since its introduction. It grew to hosting about 250 - 300 authors each year and attracting more than 40,000 attendees.

== Texas Writer Award ==
The Texas Writer Award, formerly known as the Bookend Award, is awarded each year to a Texas writer in recognition of outstanding contributions to Texas literature. The award recipient is honored with a special session at the Texas Book Festival. Previous winners of the award include Lawrence Wright, Sandra Cisneros, Dan Rather, Tim O'Brien, Attica Locke, Elizabeth McCracken, Don Tate, Rick Riordan, Stephen Harrigan and Elizabeth Crook.

== First Edition Literary Gala ==
Traditionally help the Friday before festival weekend, the First Edition Literary Gala serves as Texas Book Festival's major annual fundraiser. Gala proceeds make it possible for Texas Book Festival to bring books and authors to 15,000 students in Title I schools every year, award grants to Texas public libraries, and keep the annual fall Festival free for all.

This black-tie event is the premier social gathering in Central Texas that brings together literary luminaries, dignitaries, and cultural arts supporters. Past gala speakers include Sandra Cisneros, Dan Rather, Jacqueline Woodson, Abraham Verghese, Ann Patchett, Laura Bush, Margaret Atwood, Celeste Ng, James McBride, and other leading voices.

== Selected annual details ==
The two day festival hosts 250 to 300 authors and welcomes 40,000 attendees each year. Previous headlining authors have included Margaret Atwood, Colson Whitehead, Tom Hanks, Sonia Sotomayor, Amor Towles, Malcolm Gladwell, Roxane Gay, Stacey Abrams, John Grisham, Susan Orlean, Ann Patchett, Nick Hornby, and Walter Isaacson.

In 2020, the festival was held online, caused by the COVID-19 pandemic. In 2021, a hybrid was held, with both online and limited in-person components. In 2022, the festival returned to a fully in-person event.

The 2023 festival hosted a record 330 authors including Pulitzer Prize winners Héctor Tobar, Andrew Sean Greer, Michael Cunningham and Lawrence Wright; National Book Award winners Jacquline Woodson, Tim O'Brien and Neal Shusterman; and many bestselling and critically-acclaimed authors like Stacey Abrams, Roxane Gay, Ann Patchett, Abraham Verghese, Curtis Sittenfeld, Nana Kwame Adjei-Brenyah, S. A. Cosby, Ali Hazelwood, Steve Inskeep, Rachel Renée Russell, Esmeralda Santiago, Luis Alberto Urrea, Jonathan Lethem, Nikkolas Smith, Ingrid Rojas Contreras and Steven Rowley. The 2023 Festival also saw the expansion of Spanish language programming.

The 2024 Festival is scheduled for November 16 and 17.

== See also ==
- Books in the United States
- National Book Festival, founded by Laura Bush and James H. Billington in 2001
