= Celeste Bedford Walker =

American playwright

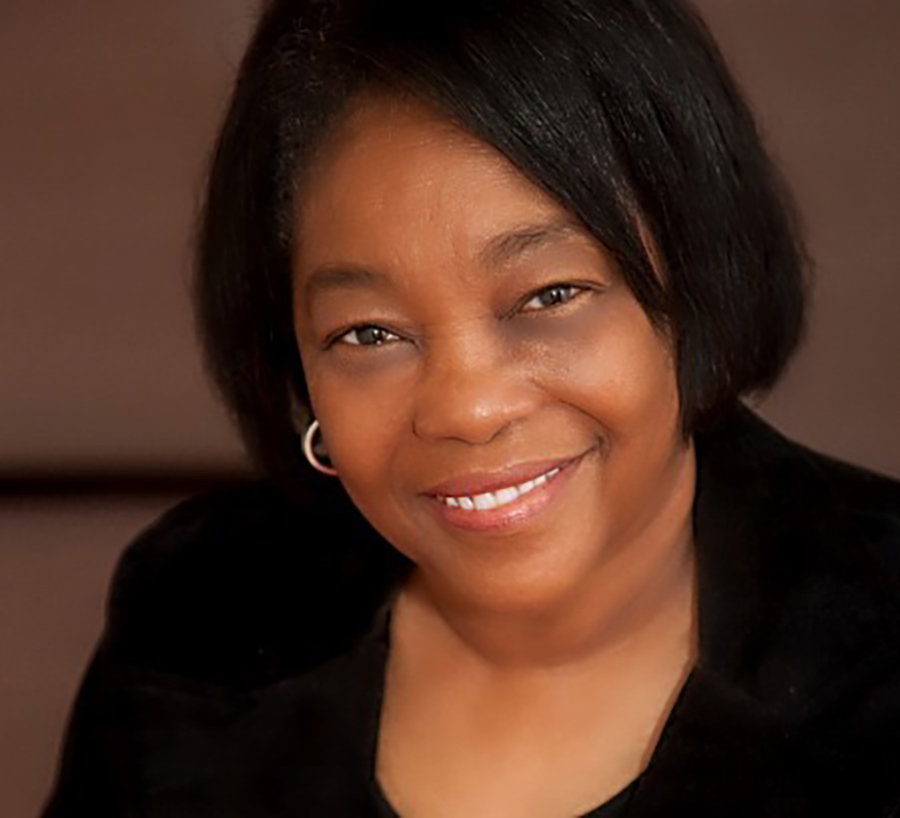
- Born: Houston, Texas, U.S.
- Education: Texas Southern University
- Occupation: Playwright
- Years active: 1978–present
- Children: 2
- Awards: Guggenheim Fellowship (2023)
- Website: www.celestebedfordwalker.com

Celeste Bedford Walker is an American playwright. Born and raised in Houston, she has written several plays on African-American history, including Camp Logan, Distant Voices, and Greenwood: An American Dream Destroyed. She has won several accolades for her work, including a 2022 Texas Institute of Letters lifetime achievement award and a 2023 Guggenheim Fellowship.

== Biography ==
=== Early life and education ===
Celeste Bedford Walker was born in Houston. Her parents were from Black rural communities; her father was from Hallettsville and her mother from Grapeland.

Raised in the Third Ward, she was inspired to go into writing after a librarian at her school introduced her to Langston Hughes after she asked her if black writers existed. She attended Yates High School, before moving on to Texas Southern University to study English and journalism, as well as a brief career in data processing.

=== Playwright career ===
Originally interested in writing novels after being inspired by Toni Morrison, she then decided to be a playwright when "she was more interested in dialogue". After working as an actor at the Black Arts Center in the Fifth Ward, she made her playwright debut with Sister, Sister in 1978; it is about a couple who create a "love square" when they each become interested in polygamy.

Walker, who briefly did research on the Houston riot of 1917 after learning about it from her relatives, wrote Camp Logan to raise awareness of the incident. It premiered in 1987 at Kuumba House, before being performed at The Ensemble Theatre and outside the state, including in California and New York state. Curator Steve Davis called the play "a great example of how literature can serve as a way to recover banished history" and noted that it "had a role in sparking an awareness of what happened".

Another work from Walker, Distant Voices (1997), is about Black figures arising from a local cemetery (Note: Sources vary on the exact cemetery: although Mayo noted that this was College Memorial Park Cemetery, Walker herself said in an interview that this was Freedman's Cemetery.) in Texas. In 2015, she wrote another play named Greenwood: An American Dream Destroyed, focused on the Tulsa race massacre.

In the 1990s, she and actor Charles S. Dutton started a new production of Sister, Sister in Los Angeles, under the new name Once in a Wifetime. Other works include musicals like Harlem after Hours, Over Forty, and Praise the Lord, and Raise the Roof!; a mystery play called Reunion in Bartersville; and a romantic comedy named Sassy Mamas, which has been widely performed and received several accolades since its 2007 premiere at the Billie Holiday Theatre. She is founder of Mountaintop Productions, which became operational in 1990.

In 2023, Texas A&M University Press published an anthology of Walker's plays called Sassy Mamas and Other Plays.

=== Themes and accolades ===
Walker's theatrical work was inspired by the Black themes of Lorraine Hansberry and Neil Simon. She once called both Camp Logan and Greenwood: An American Dream Destroyed "quintessential racial confrontation stories". Andrew Dansby described her as "a provocative, entertaining and innovative presence in Houston’s theater scene for decades". Sandra Mayo said that she "has enriched American theater and ennobled African-American theater", citing her research, subject matter, and writing.

Walker was awarded a 2022 Texas Institute of Letters lifetime achievement award. In 2023, she was awarded a Guggenheim Fellow in Drama and Performance Art. She has also won an NAACP Theatre Award, as well as awards from AUDELCO and the International Black Theatre Festival.

=== Personal life ===
Walker is married and has two children.

== Bibliography ==
- Sassy Mamas and Other Plays (2023)
