= Don't Tell Her It's Me =

- Theatrical release poster
- Directed by: Malcolm Mowbray
- Written by: Sarah Bird
- Produced by: George G. Braunstein
- Starring: Steve Guttenberg; Jami Gertz; Kyle MacLachlan; Shelley Long
- Cinematography: Reed Smoot
- Edited by: Marshall Harvey
- Music by: Michael Gore
- Distributed by: Hemdale Film Corporation; MGM
- Release date: September 21, 1990
- Running time: 101 minutes
- Country: United States
- Language: English
- Budget: $6.7 million
- Box office: $1.2 million

Don't Tell Her It's Me (alternately titled The Boyfriend School) is a 1990 comedy film starring Steve Guttenberg, Shelley Long, Jami Gertz and Kyle MacLachlan. The film was directed by Malcolm Mowbray and written by Sarah Bird (adapted from her novel The Boyfriend School).

== Plot ==
Gus Kubicek (played by Guttenberg) is a depressed and overweight cartoonist who recently won a battle against Hodgkin's disease. His caring sister Lizzie Potts (Long), a nosy romance novelist, responds to his sadness by trying to set him up with a suitable woman. Yet to do so she must make him seem more dynamic and attractive. When Gus falls in love with Emily Pear (Gertz), he adopts the persona of Lobo Marunga, a leather-clad biker from New Zealand.

Emily ends up falling for Lobo but Gus tries to tell Emily the truth as he ends up in bed with her. The next day Lobo tells Emily that he's Gus and she gets furious with him and tells him to get out. Gus, hurt, supposedly goes away to New York when in fact he is going to a friend's wedding. The movie ends with Emily tracking down Gus at the airport and they share a kiss as Lizzie watches through binoculars.

== Cast ==
- Steve Guttenberg as Gus Kubicek
- Shelley Long as Lizzie Potts
- Jami Gertz as Emily Pear
- Kyle MacLachlan as Trout
- Mädchen Amick as Mandy
- Kevin Scannell as Mitchell Potts
- Beth Grant as Babette
- O'Neal Compton as Gas Station Attendant
- Mitch Torres as Ticket Agent
