= The Brady Bunch in the White House =

- DVD cover
- Genre: Political comedy
- Based on: The Brady Bunch by Sherwood Schwartz
- Written by: Lloyd J. Schwartz; Hope Juber
- Directed by: Neal Israel
- Starring: Shelley Long; Gary Cole
- Music by: Laurence Juber
- Original language: English

Production
- Producers: Armand Leo; Lloyd J. Schwartz
- Cinematography: Bob Seaman
- Editor: Terry Stokes
- Running time: 100 minutes
- Production company: Paramount Television

Original release
- Network: Fox
- Release: November 29, 2002

The Brady Bunch in the White House is a 2002 American comedy television film and the second sequel to The Brady Bunch Movie (1995), following A Very Brady Sequel (1996). It was directed by Neal Israel and written by Lloyd J. Schwartz and Hope Juber, based upon characters originally developed by Sherwood Schwartz for the television sitcom The Brady Bunch (1969–1974). Although Shelley Long and Gary Cole reprise their roles from the previous films, the children and Alice were all recast in this film.

In the film, the Bradys return a winning lottery ticket, which endears them greatly to the public. This eventually leads to Mike Brady being elected president. The Bradys then adapt to their new lifestyle, in the White House.

It was produced by Paramount Television and first aired on November 29, 2002, on Fox. The film received negative reviews.

== Plot ==
Bobby finds a winning lottery ticket but Mike insists that it be returned to the rightful owner. Mike then invites people to the house to prove they are the owner but none are able to answer correctly what the original owner wrote on the back of the ticket. A local newscaster hears the story and Mike agrees to an interview in hopes of finding the original owner.

As a montage plays of multiple stations discussing the Brady story, the original owner is being sentenced to execution on death row and is unable to claim his winnings. Since he is not able to find the original owner, Mike decides to donate the money to charity, which attracts the attention of the President of the United States, President Randolph. President Randolph then invites him to a press conference where the president is asked about his dealings with an oil drilling company that has been abusing the environment. President Randolph insists that he has never had any dealing with the company and swears to resign if he is disproven. The press then asks who will be his running mate and Carol suggests Mike. President Randolph agrees to pick Mike as his running mate and they are shown to win the election. However, just before the President and Mike are to be sworn in, evidence reveals that President Randolph has made dealings with the oil company and is thus forced to resign which makes Mike the new president.

Mike then needs to select a new Vice President, and he picks Carol. He asks Congress for permission to appoint her and initially, the Speaker of the House, Sal Astor, is skeptical of Carol's abilities but she wins Congress over with a song and dance number. Mike settles in nicely as president and pushes to make the country even better without playing petty politics. Meanwhile, Veronica Dotwebb grumbles to Astor that he should be president and the two plot to overthrow Mike and Carol by ruining their image. Greg develops a crush on Veronica and she exploits him to divulge any useful information on his family. The Bradys are good and innocent but Veronica manages to spin their most innocuous moments into huge scandals. She claims Mike is still involved with a woman from his past; Carol is accused of being a radical hippie when she protested the destruction of a park; Marcia is called promiscuous because she wrote about a fictional erotic encounter with Desi Arnaz Jr. in her diary; Greg is accused of underage smoking because a cigarettes were found in his coat; Peter is accused of bribery for getting a better grade after he complimented his teacher; Jan is accused of cheating for getting a better grade on an essay; and Alice is accused of drugging the food so the Bradys stay happy all the time. Although this plan garners significant news coverage, it is not enough to impeach the Bradys. Veronica and Sal devise a second plan to trick Mike Brady into informing the public that a world-ending asteroid is about to hit Earth. They succeed by switching a report from NASA regarding data from a space probe with Peter's science project.

Mike addresses the public telling them he received a report from NASA that confirms a massive meteor is on a course and will cause global devastation. The Bradys are then transported to a secret bunker underneath the White House that will protect them from the ensuing danger. Sal Astor then seizes the opportunity to take power by calling an official press conference as acting president and mocks Mike Brady for falling for the hoax. Embarrassed, the public demands Mike's impeachment, but Cindy informs the family that she saw Sal switching the documents. The Bradys break out of the bunker and interrupt the press conference to tell the truth. Mike then addresses the public saying they deserve to know the truth, and goes on to start telling the story of the lottery ticket and how he got to be president.

== Cast ==
- Gary Cole as Mike Brady
- Shelley Long as Carol Brady
- Chad Doreck as Greg Brady
- Autumn Reeser as Marcia Brady
- Blake Foster as Peter Brady
- Ashley Drane as Jan Brady
- Max Morrow as Bobby Brady
- Sofia Vassilieva as Cindy Brady
- Tannis Burnett as Alice Nelson
- Saul Rubinek as Sal Astor
- Reagan Pasternak as Veronica Dotwebb
- Dave Nichols as President Lawrence Randolph

== Reception ==
The film was negatively received. Patrick Naugle of DVD Verdict called it "a pale imitation of the two previous films" and said that the television movie lacked the creative wit and humor of the two feature films.

The film was watched by 3.37 million viewers in its original broadcast.

== Home media ==
The Brady Bunch in the White House was first released on DVD in 2004, in 2011 as part of the A Brady Bunch of Movies collection and again in 2019 as part of The Brady-est Brady Bunch TV & Movie Collection.
