= Little Sister (1992 film) =

- Directed by: Jimmy Zeilinger
- Written by: Jimmy Zeilinger
- Produced by: Jeffrey R. Neuman
- Starring: Jonathan Silverman; Alyssa Milano
- Cinematography: Thomas Del Ruth
- Edited by: Michael Ripps
- Music by: Greg De Belles
- Production company: Interstar
- Distributed by: Live Home Video
- Release date: September 17, 1992
- Running time: 95 minutes
- Country: United States
- Language: English

Little Sister is a 1992 American comedy film written and directed by Jimmy Zeilinger. Starring Jonathan Silverman and Alyssa Milano, the film was released in the UK under the title Mister Sister.

== Plot ==
Bobby graduates high school with his friend Mike. His father encourages him to forge his own identity and gives him a book of romantic poems. At college, Bobby and Mike join a fraternity where Bobby can be himself and not follow in his dad's footsteps. The fraternity leader tells Bobby to instruct his fellow pledges to be more like his father.

At a party, Bobby meets Sybil and fails to impress her with the poems. Bobby encourages Mike to stop taking his dad's advice and find a girlfriend. Bobby and Mike witness an argument between Diana and her boyfriend Derry because he does not care what she thinks. When she breaks up with Derry, Bobby asks her out, but she tells him off. Derry apologizes to Diana, and they get back together.

Bobby tries to woo Sybil again while trying to find a course to study. He ends up in an all-female classroom studying the sociology of women in history. He and Mike find out that they are enrolled in a taxidermy class. Bobby, Mike, and their pledge brothers reminisce about The Brady Bunch for the fraternity leader. The leader wants them to steal a painting from the Zeta Alpha Zeta sorority house. After four failed attempts, Bobby pretends to be "Roberta" and fools the sorority sisters, though he is unable to get the painting. Bobby has difficulty maintaining both identities; he misses out on fraternity activities as himself but wants to keep the Roberta identity to be close to Diana.

Bobby asks Diana for help studying, but she believes he is asking her on a date. While studying during a thunderstorm, Bobby fails to seduce her, and she discovers his sorority scheme in a pledge book. When Roberta is elected president of the pledge class, the sorority sisters take Roberta for drinks. The girls tell Roberta they look up to her. When Derry sees Roberta, he flirts with her, and Bobby is intentionally disgusting. Bobby tells Mike that Derry is flirting with him, and they devise a plan to have Diana catch Derry in a compromising position.

The next day, Derry walks into the library and reads notes suggesting he take his clothes off. When Diana sees this, she breaks off their relationship. After a while, Bobby learns more about girls. As Roberta again, he tries to convince Diana to love Bobby. He changes into his normal clothes, but when he kisses her, he gets slapped. He ends Roberta and steals the painting. When the painting is discovered missing, one of the sorority sisters suspects Roberta. After that, Mike sets up Roberta on a date with Wally who is one of the pledge brothers.

Bobby tries again to get Diana but ends up carrying encyclopedias for her. Diana tells Bobby the differences between them are too great for them to date; then she tells him she knows what he is really doing. Bobby first believes that she knows about Roberta, but she means about what happened to Derry. They finally get together. Bobby is then shocked to learn that Diana has nominated Roberta for sorority queen.

Bobby's dual responsibility stresses him out. Bobby undresses from his Roberta clothes while Diana watches from an open window. She believes Roberta is making out with Bobby. As Roberta, Bobby returns the painting to the sorority house, drawing the ire of the fraternity. Bobby and Diana argue in class about women in history. Bobby then tells the teacher about what he has really been doing and gets moved by it.

Bobby begins to play football with his fraternity house. He wants Wally to play although Wally is not a good player. During the last play of the game, Bobby asks Mike to throw the ball to Wally. Wally falls down but catches the ball, and their fraternity house wins the game. Bobby attends the ceremony as Roberta, reveals himself, and gives a passionate speech about what he learned. After the speech, Mike applauds, and then everyone joins. Later that night, Bobby's dad comes to him and tells him that he loves him. Bobby apologizes to Diana and they make up.

== Cast ==
- Jonathan Silverman as Bobby/Roberta
- Alyssa Milano as Diana
- George Newbern as Mike
- Michele Matheson as Sybil
- Leilani Sarelle as Catherine
- Jerry Gideon as Derry
- Christine Healy as Miss Roffman
- Tia Carrere as Adrienne

== Production ==
Filming lasted until January 1991.

== Home media ==
The film was released directly to video in 1992 by Live Home Video and sometime later on a budget tape by Avid Home Entertainment.
