= Sarah Bird =

American novelist

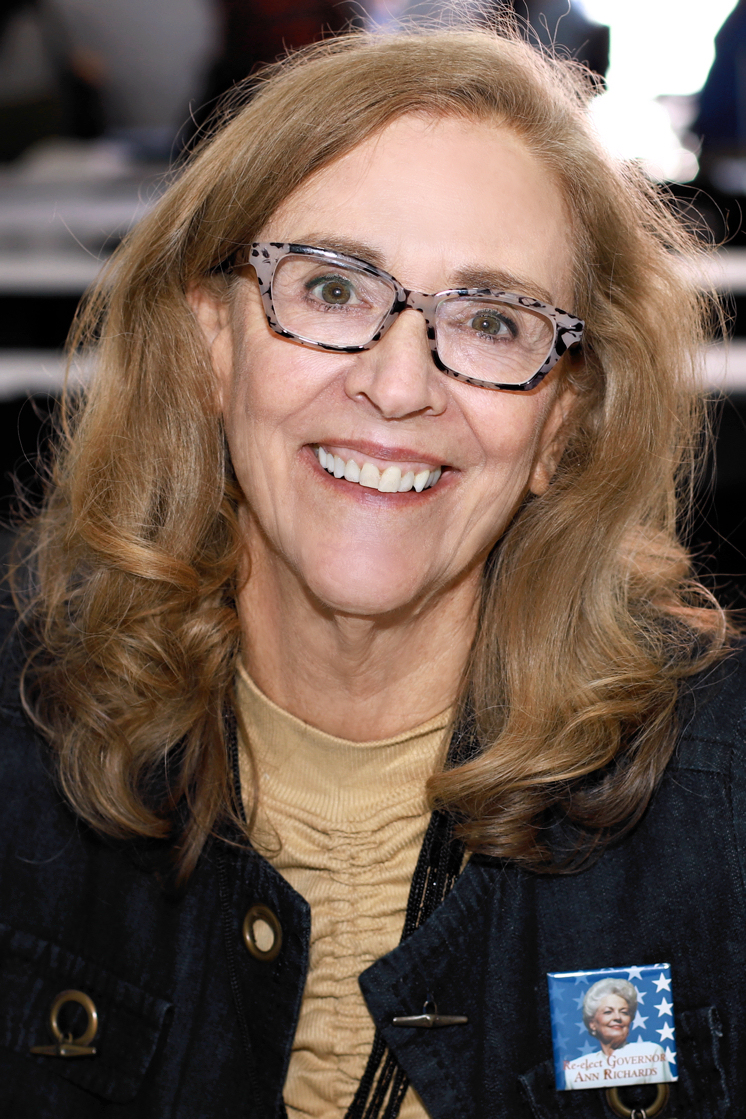
- Bird at the 2022 Texas Book Festival
- Born: 1949 (age 76–77); Ann Arbor, Michigan, U.S.
- Education: University of New Mexico (BA); University of Texas at Austin (MA)
- Occupations: Novelist; screenwriter; journalist
- Spouse: George Jones
- Children: 1
- Writing career
- Pen name: Tory Cates

Sarah Bird (born 1949) is an American novelist, screenwriter, and journalist.

== Biography ==
She was born in 1949 in Ann Arbor, Michigan. Her father was an officer in the US Air Force, and her family (a "Catholic family of eight"), including her mother, Colista Bird, travelled with him around the US and the world during her childhood. Bird's mother recognized signs of her daughter's creative storytelling talent as young as kindergarten.

She attended the University of New Mexico, earning a BA there in 1973. Moving to the University of Texas at Austin, she went on to receive an MA in journalism there in 1976. She is married to George Jones, and has one son, Gabriel Bird-Jones, born in 1989. The family lives in Austin, Texas.

During the mid-1980s, Bird was a founding contributing-editor to Austin's Third Coast Magazine, for which she wrote numerous feature and humor articles.

Bird's first published novel was Do Evil Cheerfully, a mystery (as Sarah McCabe Bird).

In 1986, her comic novel Alamo House was published based on her experience as a graduate student at the University of Texas.

She published five contemporary romance novels with Silhouette under the pseudonym "Tory Cates".

Bird wrote the screenplay for the movie Don't Tell Her It's Me (1990, starring Shelley Long and Steve Guttenberg), adapting the Boyfriend School novel.

The Boyfriend School and The Mommy Club, published by Ballantine in 1989 and 1991, respectively, were both humorous novels drawing on Bird's life experiences. In addition to novels, Bird has written screenplays for television and magazine articles for national women's magazines. She writes a column for Texas Monthly. Virgin of the Rodeo was published in 1999.

Bird was named Austin's best author in 2001 by the Austin Chronicle, the year she also published The Yokota Officers Club, a novel that draws on her experiences as military brat. She has also written screenplays for the National Geographic Channel and Hallmark, as well as the CBS movie Yesterday's Children.

Another novel, The Flamenco Academy, came out in 2006. A new novel, How Perfect Is That, was published by Knopf in June 2008.

== Bibliography ==
=== Novels ===
- Do Evil Cheerfully, 1983 (as Sarah McCabe Bird)
- Alamo House, 1986
- The Boyfriend School, 1989, Doubleday
- The Mommy Club, 1991
- Virgin of the Rodeo, 1999
- The Yokota Officers Club, 2001
- The Flamenco Academy, 2006
- How Perfect Is That, 2008
- The Gap Year, 2011
- Above the East China Sea, 2014
- Daughter of a Daughter of a Queen, 2018
- Last Dance on the Starlight Pier, 2022

=== Nonfiction ===
- A Love Letter to Texas Women, 2016, University of Texas Press
