= Christine Healy =

American television and film actress (born 1950)

- Born: June 13, 1950 (age 74); Buffalo, New York, U.S.
- Occupation: Actress
- Years active: 1986–present

Christine Healy (born June 13, 1950) is an American television and film actress. She has had recurring roles in television multiple series, including ER and The Days and Nights of Molly Dodd. Her film appearances include Like Father Like Son (1987), Voices Within: The Lives of Truddi Chase (1990) and Little Sister (1992).

== Filmography ==
=== Film ===
Year	Title	Role	Notes
1987	Like Father Like Son	Hospital Administrator	
1992	Little Sister	Miss Roffman	
2002	Murder by Numbers	Justin's Mother	

=== Television ===
Year	Title	Role	Notes
1986	St. Elsewhere	Katie Ewell	2 episodes
1986	My Sister Sam	Real Estate Agent	Episode: "Babes in the Woods"
1986	L.A. Law	Maureen Stanton	Episode: "Sidney, the Dead-Nosed Reindeer"
1987	Starman	Anna Gionetti	Episode: "The Wedding"
1987	Sledge Hammer!	Dr. Dorothy Stone	Episode: "Dressed to Call"
1987–1988	The Days and Nights of Molly Dodd	Dr. Janet Lichfield	3 episodes
1988	Weekend War	Elaine Garfield	Television film
1988	Highway to Heaven	Lisa Bradley	2 episodes
1988	Cagney & Lacey	Barbara Dowling	Episode: "A Fair Shake: Part 1"
1988	Santa Barbara	Lauren Jenkins	Episode #1.1085
1988–1989	Day by Day	Nina Farrell	3 episodes
1989	Nightingales	Sandra Aberling	Episode #1.13
1989	The Preppie Murder	Ellen Levin, Mother	Television film
1990	Who's the Boss?	Jane	Episode: "Couple Trouble"
1990	Voices Within: The Lives of Truddi Chase	Sharon Barnes	Television film
1990	Lifestories	Janet Crosley	Episode: "Don Chapin"
1990	The Trials of Rosie O'Neill	AIDS Counselor	Episode: "An Act of Love"
1990	Going Places	The Witch	Episode: "Curse of the Video"
1991	Don't Touch My Daughter	Susan	Television film
1991	Knight Rider 2000	Commissioner Ruth Daniels	Television film
1991	Without Warning: The James Brady Story	Ruth	Television film
1992	Brooklyn Bridge	Miss Driscoll	Episode: "The Gift"
1992	In the Heat of the Night	Susan Lawrence	Episode: "Love, Honor and Obey"
1992	FBI: The Untold Stories	Ramona Thompson	Episode: "Babynap"
1993	Boy Meets World	Jane	Episode: "Class Pre-Union"
1994	Moment of Truth: Cradle of Conspiracy	Ellen Rydell	Television film
1994	Star Trek: Deep Space Nine	Seltin Rakal	Episode: "Meridian"
1994	Party of Five	Margaret	2 episodes
1994–1999	ER	Administrator Harriet Spooner	3 episodes
1995	Amazing Grace	Beverly	Episode: "Hallelujah"
1995	Liz: The Elizabeth Taylor Story	Sara Taylor	Television film
1995	Live Shot	Mrs. Mathias	Episode: "The Forgotten Episode"
1995	The Larry Sanders Show	Kim	Episode: "Larry's Sitcom"
1996	Dr. Quinn, Medicine Woman	Dr. Miriam Tilson	Episode: "Reunion"
1996	Malibu Shores	Amanda Goldin	Episode: "The Fall"
1997	Friends 'Til the End	Mrs. Romley	Television film
1997	Martin	Sister Mary Tyler	Episode: "Auction"
1997	The Burning Zone	Marge	Episode: "Elegy for a Dream"
1997	Cracker	Irene	Episode: "True Romance: Part 1"
1997	The Visitor	Elaine Barker	Episode: "The Black Box"
1997	7th Heaven	Stan's Mother	Episode: "Girls Just Want to Have Fun"
1997	The Pretender	Emma Barrett	Episode: "Past Sim"
1997, 2000	The Practice	Cindy Keller / Sheila Walworth	2 episodes
1998	You Lucky Dog	Margaret Windsor	Television film
1998, 2001	Touched by an Angel	Renee Harris / Mary Todd Lincoln	2 episodes
1999	Promised Land	Paula Notewirthy	2 episodes
2000–2001	Gideon's Crossing	Mrs. Porter	3 episodes
2001	Strong Medicine	Patricia Langford	Episode: "Drug Interactions"
2001	Family Law	Valerie	Episode: "Against All Odds"
2002	Almost a Woman	Mrs. Parsons	Television film
2003	Without a Trace	Josh's Mother	Episode: "Victory for Humanity"
2003	Buffy the Vampire Slayer	The Guardian	Episode: "End of Days"
2003	Charmed	Grandma Callaway	Episode: "Love's a Witch"
2005	Invasion	Dr. Bates	Episode: "Unnatural Selection"
2006	Close to Home	Sandra Allen	Episode: "The Good Doctor"
2007	Criminal Minds	Mrs. Manwaring	Episode: "Children of the Dark"
2008	House	Janice	Episode: "Birthmarks"
2010	The Whole Truth	Judge Anna Mae Harmon	2 episodes
