= Texas Institute of Letters =

Texas organization recognizing literary achievement

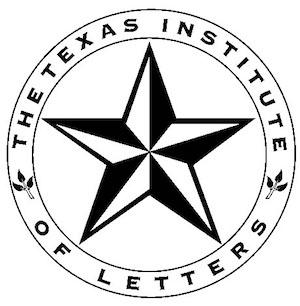
Texas Institute of Letters

The Texas Institute of Letters is a non-profit Honor Society founded by William Harvey Vann in 1936 to celebrate Texas literature and to recognize distinctive literary achievement. The TIL’s elected membership consists of the state’s most respected writers of fiction, nonfiction, poetry, journalism, and scholarship. Induction into the TIL is based on literary accomplishments. Application for membership is not accepted. The rules governing the selection of members and officers are contained in the TIL By-Laws. The TIL annually elects new members, gives awards to recognize outstanding literary works, and awards the Jesse H. Jones Fellowship for writers. The TIL offers awards to outstanding books written by Texas authors, or dealing with Texas subjects.

Each year the TIL awards over $40,000 in literary prizes, including the Jesse H. Jones Award for Best Book of Fiction, the Carr P. Collins Award for Best Book of Nonfiction, the Sergio Troncoso Award for Best First Book of Fiction, the Texas Institute of Letters Award for Most Significant Scholarly Book, the Burdine C. Johnson Award for Best Book of Poetry, the Naomi Shihab Nye Award For Best First Book of Poetry, the Beverly Lowry Award for Best First Book of Nonfiction, the Jean Flynn Award for Best Young Adult Book, the Deirdre Siobhan FlynnBass Award for Best Middle Grade Book, the Brigid Erin Flynn Award for Best Picture Book, the Edwin "Bud" Shrake Award for Best Short Nonfiction, the Kay Cattarulla Award for Best Short Story, the Fred Whitehead Award for Design of a Trade Book (biennial), and the Soeurette Diehl Fraser Award for Best Translation of a Book (biennial). The TIL also awards the Jesse H. Jones Fellowship for writers at any state of their careers to fund the completion of a literary work of fiction, poetry, or nonfiction for a general audience.

The TIL website has a complete list of all the winners from every prize category starting from 1936 to present.

Prominent members include: Sarah Bird, Sandra Cisneros, Elizabeth Crook, Robert Flynn, Ben Fountain, Stephen Harrigan, Skip Hollandsworth, Cormac McCarthy, Larry McMurtry, Pat Mora, Rick Riordan, Naomi Shihab Nye, Benjamin Alire Sáenz, George Saunders, Cynthia Leitich Smith, W. K. Stratton, Carmen Tafolla, Sergio Troncoso, Abraham Verghese, and Lawrence Wright.

== The Texas Institute of Letters Lifetime Achievement Award ==
The Texas Institute of Letters Lifetime Achievement Award is an award bestowed annually to distinguished writers from, or in some way associated with, Texas and is the TIL's highest honor. The honorees are chosen by the TIL Council from nominations made by the membership.

Winners

1981: Thomas C. Lea III (1907–2001)
1982: John Graves (1920-2013)
1983: William A. Owens (1905–1990)
1984: Larry McMurtry (1936–2021)
1985: Donald Barthelme (1931–1989)
1987: Elmer Kelton (1926–2009)
1987: A.C. Greene (1923–2002)
1988: Charles Leland "Doc" Sonnichsen (1901–1991)
1989: John Edward Weems (1924–1999)
1990: Marshall Northway Terry Jr. (1931-2016)
1991: Margaret Cousins (1905–1996)
1992: Vassar Miller (1924–1998)
1993: Horton Foote (1916–2009)
1994: Americo Paredes (1915–1999)
1995: William Humphrey (1924–1997)
1996: Cormac McCarthy (1933-2023)
1997: Rolando Hinojosa-Smith (1929-2022)
1998: Robert Flynn (born 1932)
1999: Walt McDonald (1934-2022)
2000: Leon Hale (1921–2021)
2001: William H. Goetzmann (1930–2010)
2002: Shelby Hearon (1931-2016)
2003: Bud Shrake (1931–2009)
2004: T. R. Fehrenbach (1925-2013)
2005: James Martin Hoggard (1941-2021)
2006: William D. Wittliff (1940-2019)
2007: David Joseph Weber (1940–2010)
2008: Carolyn C. Osborn (born 1934)
2009: Larry L. King (1929–2012) †
2011: C.W. Smith (born 1940)
2012: Gary Cartwright (born 1934)
2013: Stephen Harrigan (born 1948)
2014: Jan Reid (born 1945)
2015: Lawrence Wright (born 1947)
2016: Sarah Bird (born 1949)
2017: Pat Mora (born 1942)
2018: Sandra Cisneros (born 1954)
2019: Naomi Shihab Nye (born 1952)
2020: John Rechy (born 1931)
2021: Benjamin Alire Sáenz (born 1954)
2022: Celeste Bedford Walker (born 1947)
2023: Beverly Lowry (born 1938)
2024: Carmen Tafolla (born 1951)
2025: Elizabeth Crook (born 1959)

† Beginning 2011, the award date reflects the actual date of the presentation. For instance, Larry King's 2009 award was actually presented in 2010. Beginning in 2024, the award name was changed from the Lon Tinkle Award to the Texas Institute of Letters Lifetime Achievement Award.
