= Clay Reynolds =

Texas novelist and literary critic (1949–2022)

- Born: Richard Clay Reynolds; September 28, 1949; Quanah, Texas, U.S.
- Died: April 14, 2022 (aged 72)
- Education: University of Texas at Austin; Trinity University; University of Tulsa (PhD)
- Occupations: Novelist; short story writer; literary critic; teacher
- Spouse: Judy
- Children: 2
- Writing career
- Years active: 1986–2022
- Genres: Texas fiction; historical fiction; Westerns; essays
- Notable works: The Tentmaker; Franklin's Crossing; Agatite
- Website: clayreynoldstx.com

Richard Clay Reynolds (September 28, 1949 – April 14, 2022) was a Texan novelist, essayist, book critic and English professor. Author of more than 10 books of fiction, five books of nonfiction, hundreds of published essays and 1000+ critical book reviews, he lived and taught at universities in Texas and elsewhere.

== Early life and education ==
Reynolds grew up in Quanah (roughly halfway between the Texas cities of Dallas and Amarillo). His father (Jessie Wrex) was a railroad man who moved to Quanah from the nearby town of Acme, Texas after returning from World War II. There he met and later married Pauline Faught, who came from Eldorado, Oklahoma.

Although considered a "city boy," by Quanah's residents, Reynolds did farm and ranch work during the summers and frequented the public library. Looking back, he came to appreciate growing up in Quanah, writing "I received a good education in values and human nature, although not much in the way of formal learning." During high school, Reynolds wrote later, "along with John Knowles, (Larry) McMurtry was my most astounding literary discovery...." A few years after high school, Reynolds was introduced to Larry McMurtry in Archer City; he wrote that the meeting left him feeling "more than a little overwhelmed. It wasn't so much that he (McMurtry) was a "real" writer ... it was more that he was a writer from Texas, my Texas, West Texas. Writers weren't supposed to come from there." Later, Reynolds' own fiction would be compared to that of McMurtry and Cormac McCarthy.

Reynolds enrolled at Trinity University in San Antonio to study drama, and then transferred to the University of Texas at Austin, where he received a degree in history in 1971. Later, he returned to Trinity for a master's degree in English with a specialization in 20th-century American literature in 1974. Finally he received his Ph.D. in Modern Literature from the University of Tulsa in 1979. His revised dissertation was later published by Whitston Publishing under the title Stage Left: The Development of the American Social Drama in the Thirties.

== Academic career ==
Reynolds taught in the department of English at Lamar University until 1988, when he resigned as an associate professor to take up a position as full professor of English and novelist-in-residence at the University of North Texas at Denton. He resigned that position in 1992 to work as a full-time writer and accepted short-term teaching assignments at various universities: Villanova University, West Texas A & M University, Texas Woman's University, and the University of South Dakota. In 1998 he was appointed associate professor of Arts and Humanities at the University of Texas at Dallas, where he taught until retirement, serving for six years as Associate Dean for Undergraduate Studies and College Master in the School of Arts and Humanities. Eventually he became Professor and Director of Creative Writing, retiring in 2019.

== Novels and short stories ==
According to his podcast interview with Baen Books, Reynolds started writing fiction in 1984 as a diversion from writing academic articles. In his spare time, he wrote fiction, eventually finishing two manuscripts and submitting them, one to a literary agent and one to a publisher. St. Martin's Press published both books, starting with The Vigil (the later book), which was a much smaller story than the first completed manuscript, Agatite—focusing on a mother searching for her missing daughter who disappeared during their stopover in the fictional town of Agatite, Texas. According to a review of the Vigil in the New York Times, "Mr. Reynolds writes no-nonsense prose, and his rendering of the town of Agatite and its inhabitants, while not especially vivid, is efficient. Best of all, he knows how to create and sustain tension without resorting to sensationalism. His book, like its protagonist, has a stubborn integrity that you can't help admiring."

Franklin's Crossing (1993) is in the words of one critic his "big" book (688 pages) and "his most overtly historic novel...a frontier saga set a few years after the Civil War in the so-called Comanche Spring of 1874." In addition to receiving advance praise by Elmer Kelton and Larry McMurtry, the book was described by one critic as a "crass, uneasy mix of women’s romance, men’s action yarn, historical detail, and the deplorable contemporary vogue for sadistic cruelty and horror.”

Another novel, the 2003 novel, Ars Poetica: A Postmodern Parable, is considered an academic satire set in contemporary times. Author George Garrett, the judge who selected this book as the winner of the 2002 George Garrett Fiction Prize, called it a "masterfully told tale of an aging poet who finally turns his back on the system that he feels failed him ...." One critic described the novel as "darkly comic and compelling ... (which) works as portrait of a poet's pathetic slide into despair."

In 2007, Reynolds published the story collection Sandhill County Lines containing stories written over 20 years. The book's introduction (written by Reynolds) states that the stories were revised from their original published forms as the author's sensibilities toward his subjects had evolved over time. Publishers Weekly described the book as "nine winning yarns about smalltown people trapped in mean circumstances ....Reynolds shines penetrating light on small lives. Another review praised the story "Etta's Pond" and "The Baptism," while noting that many stories in the collection read as slowly as novels and lacked the succinctness of the traditional short story. In an introduction to one of his books, Reynolds indicates that The Vigil, Agatite, Franklin’s Crossing, Monuments and Sandhill County Lines all take place in this same mythical Sandhill county. One critic wrote, "Reynolds has expanded his personal postage stamp of American into a Faulknerian Yoknapatapha that he calls Sandhill County. It accommodates one-hundred years of movement from savagery to civilization, an indictment of cultural stagnation, and an elegy for people and events long forgotten."

The Tentmaker novel (2012) tells the story of a 19th-century tentmaker who journeys to Texas and decides to stay after his wagon breaks down in the middle of nowhere. One reviewer described this novel as "written with brio and fidelity to historical detail". Another reviewer called Tentmaker a "nearly perfect novel ... marred only by an off-putting, unnecessarily violent opening chapter". Another review described the book as "funny, raunchy and fascinating as (protagonist) Gil Hooley becomes the reluctant hero of a horse opera powered by odd twists of plot acted out by some even odder characters". One critic, commenting on the less-than-heroic qualities of Hooley the protagonist, remarks that "by introducing heroes as antiheroes, (Reynolds) approaches flawed characters with heart. The Old West stereotype, so solid, separate, and alone, suddenly becomes capable of self-sacrifice, love and redemptive acts".

Vox Populi: A novel of the common man (2013) is a series of character studies of ordinary people in their everyday lives. The author's preface explains that the book doesn't offer a typical story arc and shouldn't be considered a series of independent stories. One critic called it a "subtle performance," saying that "Clay Reynolds is uncannily skilled at rendering vignettes of strangers forced to occupy the same physical space." Another reviewer wrote that despite its ambitions, the novel fell short in creating a "memorable, interesting narrative" and that the narrator lacked vitality and the "self-reflective introspection that should contradict and thus validate his lack of vitality."

== Reynolds and the Western novel ==
The fiction of Reynolds has been given many labels (such as "Texas fiction" "western fiction" or "historical fiction"). However, his fiction often diverges from the conventions and formula of some genres, to the point where Reynolds himself is unable to classify his fiction. In fact, Reynolds wrote that the setting for his books remains firmly grounded in the western environs of Texas even though he has set scenes in New York, Los Angeles, Dallas, Houston, New Orleans, Mexico, and an unnamed Latin American country. Although Reynolds has written about the American West and reviewed historical novels, his fiction is set in a variety of time periods: 1870s, 1880s, 1960s, 1970s, 1990s and even a 21st-century urban environment (Vox Populi).

When talking about his historical novel Franklin's Crossing, Reynolds wrote: "The story of the American West is our only real history, and often it's not a pretty one. Nevertheless, it's one that needs to be remembered accurately and truly, and I hope that through my fiction, I can help readers understand much of what it was like to be alive in a time that was more bewildering than satisfying, more conscious of its destiny than of its arrival." One critic wrote that one distinguishing feature of Reynolds' fiction "is found in the recurrent pattern of tongue-tied and not very bright good old Texas boys courting the mystery of beauty they cannot understand nor resist." Another critic wrote that Reynolds is "helping to restore western history to where it belongs in the lives of real people who have lived in real places," and his fiction acknowledges that prior depictions of the West have "...perpetuated false attitudes, the excesses of individualism and rationalism against the need for sharing and intuition, the absurdity of misogyny, and the prejudices against Native Americans, African Americans, and Hispanics."

== Thoughts on writing, teaching and publishing ==
During the last thirty-five years of his career, Reynolds taught creative writing. He wrote numerous essays and gave several public lectures about the subject of writing and publishing. In his later years of teaching, Reynolds published several essays on the subject, including: "The Role of the Writer in Academy" and "How Much Work Could a Workshop Work if a Workshop Workshopped Work?"

== Family life, retirement and death ==
After retiring, Reynolds lived in Lowry Crossing, Texas, near McKinney, with his wife Judy.

In 2016 Reynolds published an essay, Reaching the Summit: A Confession and a Valediction about his views about retirement. The essay concludes with imagery of climbing a mountain and hoping for some new peak to magically appear.

During the last year before his death, Reynolds had an extensive interview with Robert Nagle about his life, literary works and academic career. This 10 part interview was eventually published in July 2025. Topics covered in this interview included: his family life (especially during the Covid pandemic), how he did historical research for his novels, his approach to essay writing and his life at various universities.

Reynolds died on April 14, 2022, from pancreatic cancer.

== Works ==
Publishing information listed for each book refers to the printed edition. Between 2012 and 2016 the ebook publisher Baen Books re-released most of Reynolds' fiction titles as ebooks. Many of the ebook releases contain new introductions by the author which are readable as book samples on the Baen Book pages for the books. Many uncollected stories and essays which were previously published in literary and academic journals are available on the author's personal website.

=== Fiction/poetry/plays ===
- The Vigil. New York: St. Martin's Press/Richard Marek, 1986; London: Robert Hale, 1986; Tokyo: Shinchosha, Inc., 1989; rpt. Dallas: SMU Press, Southwest Life and Letters Series, 1988; rpt. Lubbock: Texas Tech University Press, 2001.
- Agatite. New York: St. Martin's Press, 1986; Tokyo: Shinchosha, Inc., 1995; New York: rpt. Also published under the title Rage by Signet in 1994.
- Franklin’s Crossing. New York: Dutton, 1992; Signet, 1993.
- Players. New York: Carroll and Graf, 1997; Pinnacle 1998.
- Monuments. Lubbock: Texas Tech University Press, 2000.
- The Tentmaker. New York: Penguin/Putnam/Berkley, 2002.
- Ars Poetica. Huntsville, TX: Texas Review Press (aka Sam Houston State University Press), 2003.
- Threading the Needle. Lubbock: Texas Tech University Press, 2003.
- Sandhill County Lines. Lubbock: Texas Tech University Press, 2007. (Also published as an audio book with Recorded Books).
- Vox Populi: A Novel of the Common Man. Huntsville, TX: Texas Review Press, 2013.

=== Non-fiction ===
- Stage Left: The Development of the American Social Drama in the Thirties. Troy, New York: The Whitston Press, 1986.
- One Hundred Years of Heroes: The Southwestern Exposition and Livestock Show . Fort Worth: TCU Press, 1995.
- Twenty Questions: Answers for the Aspiring Writer. Dallas: Browder Springs Press, 1998.
- Let Us Prey. Columbus, Mississippi: Genesis Press, 1999. Co-wrote a book with Hunter Lundy (but uncredited when originally published).
- Of Snakes & sex & Playing in the Rain: Random Thoughts on Harmful Things. Baen Books, 2013.

=== Contributor or editor (books) ===
- Taking Stock: A Larry McMurtry Casebook. Dallas: SMU Press, 1989. (Edited and contributed 3 essays) Online version is available at Archive.org.
- The Plays of Jack London. Forest Hills, NY: Ironweed Press, 2000. (Wrote introduction). Online version is available at Archive.org
- Hero of a Hundred Fights: Collected Stories from the Dime Novel King, from Buffalo Bill to Wild Bill Hickok by Ned Buntline. NY, New York: Union Square Press, 2011. (Edited and introduced by R. Clay Reynolds).

== Awards ==
- 2018: Texas Institute of Letters Kay Cattarula Award for Best Short Fiction
- 2018: Texas Institute of Letters Bud Shrake Award for Best Short Nonfiction
- 2012 - Spur Award for Best Short Fiction for “The Deacon’s Horse” by Clay Reynolds (shared award with Rod Miller)
- 2005: American Studies Association of Texas’ “Best Paper Award.” (for “Which Way Did They Go: What Happened to the Western: Backtrailing for Affirmation,” 2005).
- 2002: Texas Review Press: George Garrett Fiction Prize for Best Novel (for the novel Ars Poetica: A Postmodern Parable).
- 2001: Violet Crown Fiction Award for Best Novel (for Monuments)
- 1998: Council on National Literatures Fiction Award
- 1997: Texas Council for the Arts/Austin Writers’ League Literature Grant
- 1997: PEN Texas Awards for Essay and Fiction
- 1994: Fellowship, National Endowment for the Arts
- 1993: ALE Award for Short Fiction (for the story, "Fist Fight," published in Texas Short Fiction: A World in Itself).

A full list of nominations and awards can be found on the University of Texas Dallas faculty page and the author's personal website. In 2001 Sam Houston State University English department started awarding an annual Clay Reynolds Novella Prize in honor of Mr. Reynolds' contribution to fiction.
