= Frozen Assets (film) =

1992 film by George T. Miller

- Canadian home video poster
- Directed by: George T. Miller
- Written by: Don Klein; Tom Kartozian
- Produced by: Don Klein
- Starring: Shelley Long; Corbin Bernsen; Larry Miller
- Cinematography: Ron Lautore; Geza Sinkovics
- Edited by: Larry Bock
- Music by: Michael Tavera
- Production company: Frozen Assets Productions
- Distributed by: RKO Pictures
- Release date: October 23, 1992
- Running time: 96 minutes
- Country: United States
- Language: English
- Budget: $5 million
- Box office: $376,008 (USA)

Frozen Assets is a 1992 American comedy film directed by George T. Miller. It stars Shelley Long and Corbin Bernsen.

== Plot ==
Los Angeles bank executive Zach Shepard takes a new job at a sperm bank in Oregon. After some initial confusion, Zach and the sperm bank's doctor, Grace Murdock, deal with a shortage of donations by holding a contest with a $100,000 prize. Men abstain from sex to save themselves for donations while a local brothel protests the sperm bank for having ruined its business.

Zach is assisted by Newton, an escaped mental patient who lives with his mother.

== Cast ==
- Shelley Long as Dr. Grace Murdock
- Corbin Bernsen as Zach Shepard
- Larry Miller as Newton Patterson
- Dody Goodman as Mrs. Patterson
- Gerrit Graham as Lewis Crandall
- Matt Clark as J.F. Hughes
- Dallas McKennon as a Stud of the Year Octogenarian

== Filming ==
Filming took place in Portland, Oregon, and at the Columbia River Gorge.

== Reception ==
The film bombed at the box office, only earning $376,008 in the United States, and contemporary reviews of the film were mostly negative. In his review for the Chicago Sun-Times, critic Roger Ebert awarded the film a rare zero-star rating, writing: "I felt like I was an eyewitness to a disaster. If I had been an actor in the film, I would have wondered why all the characters in this movie seem dumber than the average roadkill. What puzzles me is this film's tone. It's essentially a children's film with a dirty mind. This is a movie to watch in appalled silence. To call it the year's worst would be a kindness." On their television show, Ebert's colleague Gene Siskel said that Frozen Assets was "one of the dumbest comedies I have ever seen" and that the screening was among the most depressing experiences of his 23 years as a professional film critic.

Writing in the Los Angeles Times, critic Kevin Thomas described the film as "hopeless, a romantic comedy with a tricky premise that demands the utmost in inspiration to carry it off but instead receives only the most trite, stale development" and that it was "synthetic from start to finish," that the writers Klein and Kartozian "reveal little aptitude for writing jokes," and that co-stars Long and Bernsen are "so lightweight that you come away feeling that maybe they really do belong on TV [...] and not on the big screen." A review in The Philadelphia Inquirer by Desmond Ryan described the film as "a stillborn comedy" with "the most idiotic script to reach the screen this year," and that it is "the kind of movie that is so wretched you watch it with clenched eyes." Rene Rodriguez of The Miami Herald wrote that the film is "amazingly bad" and "a boring collection of lame one-liners and flat, unfunny comedy," and that "it's hard to imagine a weaker story concept."

Frozen Assets holds a 0% rating on Rotten Tomatoes based on nine reviews.
