= Different Flowers =

- Poster
- Directed by: Morgan Dameron
- Written by: Morgan Dameron
- Produced by: Shelley Long; David Karp; Morgan Dameron
- Starring: Emma Bell; Hope Lauren; Shelley Long; Romy Rosemont; Rob Mayes; Sterling Knight
- Cinematography: Jordan McNeile
- Edited by: Nate Orloff
- Music by: Chris Westlake
- Release date: February 2017 (Santa Barbara)
- Running time: 99 minutes
- Country: United States
- Language: English

Different Flowers is a 2017 American drama film written and directed by Morgan Dameron and starring Emma Bell, Hope Lauren, Shelley Long, Romy Rosemont, Rob Mayes and Sterling Knight.

== Cast ==
- Shelley Long as Grandma Mildred
- Emma Bell as Millie
- Hope Lauren as Emma
- Rob Mayes as Blake
- Sterling Knight as Charlie
- Romy Rosemont as Mrs. Haven

== Production ==
In July 2016, it was announced that Long was cast in the film.

== Release ==
The film premiered at the Santa Barbara International Film Festival in February 2017.

== Reception ==
The film has an 80% rating on Rotten Tomatoes based on five reviews.
