= Shelley Long =

American actress and comedian (born 1949)

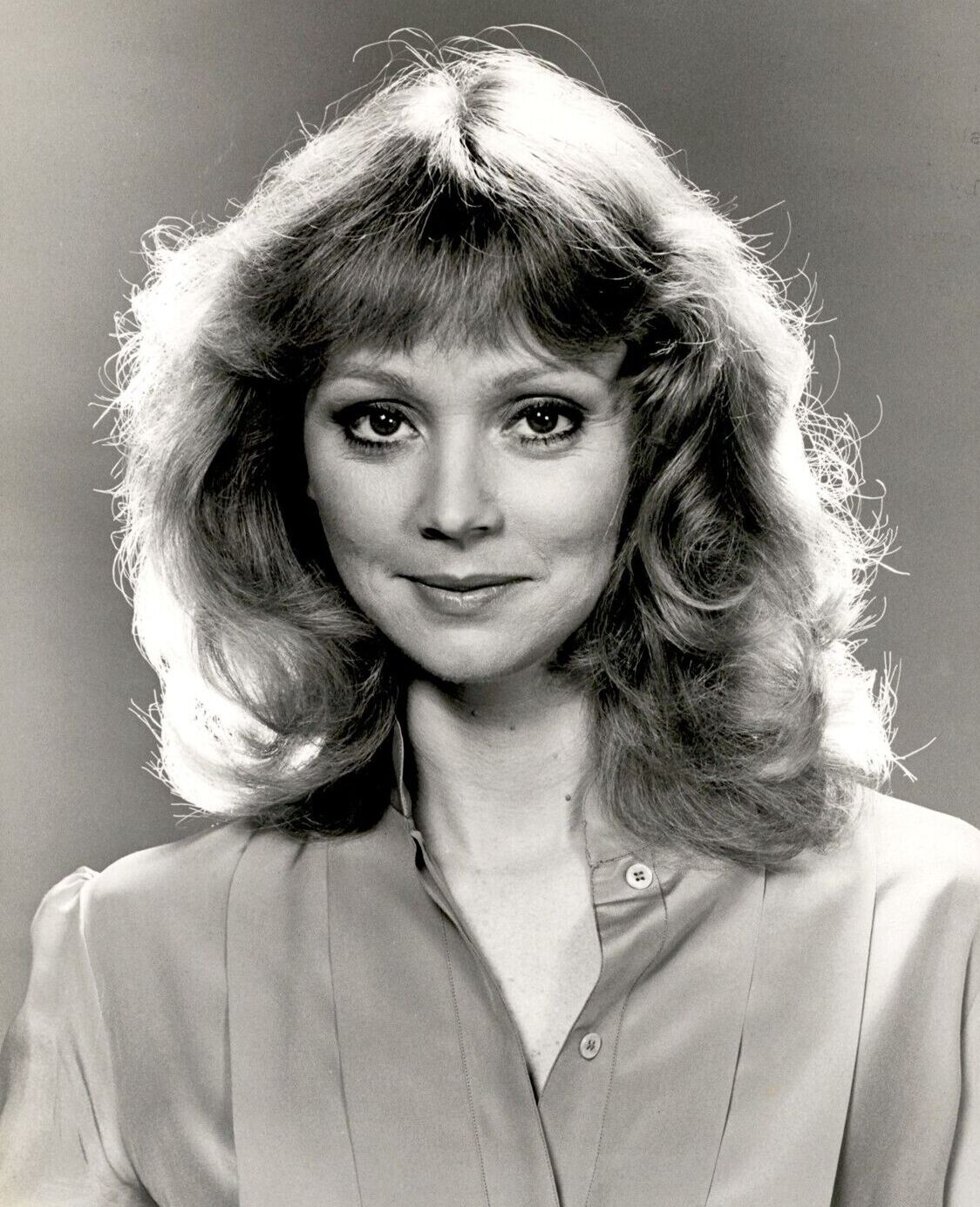
- Long in 1982
- Born: August 23, 1949 (age 77); Fort Wayne, Indiana, U.S.
- Education: Northwestern University
- Occupations: Actress; singer; comedian
- Years active: 1971–2022
- Known for: Cheers; Irreconcilable Differences; Night Shift; Outrageous Fortune; Hello Again; The Brady Bunch Movie; A Very Brady Sequel; The Brady Bunch in the White House
- Spouses: Ken Solomon (div. 1970s); Bruce Tyson (m. 1981; div. 2004)
- Children: 1

Shelley Lee Long (born August 23, 1949) is an American actress, singer, and comedian. For her role as Diane Chambers on the sitcom Cheers, Long received five Emmy nominations, winning in 1983 for Outstanding Lead Actress in a Comedy Series. She also won two Golden Globe Awards for the role. Long reprised her role as Diane Chambers in three episodes of the spin-off Frasier, for which she received an additional guest star Emmy nomination. From 2009 to 2018, she played the recurring role of DeDe Pritchett on the ABC comedy series Modern Family.

Long has also starred in several films including Night Shift (1982), Irreconcilable Differences (1984), The Money Pit (1986), Outrageous Fortune (1987), Hello Again (1987), Troop Beverly Hills (1989), The Brady Bunch Movie (1995), A Very Brady Sequel (1996), and Dr. T & the Women (2000).

== Early life ==
Shelley Long was born on August 23, 1949, in Fort Wayne, Indiana. She is the only child of Ivadine (née Williams), a schoolteacher, and Leland Long, who worked in the rubber industry before becoming a teacher as well.

Shelley was raised in the Presbyterian faith. She was active on her high school speech team, competing in the Indiana High School Forensic Association. In 1967, she won the National Forensic League's National Championship in Original Oratory.

After graduating from South Side High School in Fort Wayne, she studied drama at Northwestern University.

== Career ==
In the mid-1970s, Long's break as an actress occurred when she began performing in local commercials for Homemakers furniture store in the Chicago area.

=== Early roles (1977–1982) ===
In Chicago, Long joined The Second City comedy troupe. In 1975, she began writing, producing, and co-hosting the television program Sorting It Out on WMAQ-TV and went on to win three Regional Emmys for her work on the show. She also appeared in the 1970s in VO5 shampoo print advertisements and in commercials for Camay soap as well as more Homemakers furniture commercials. In 1978, she appeared in a vignette on The Love Boat.

Long appeared in the 1979 television film The Cracker Factory as a psychiatric inmate. In the same year she guest starred on Family and Trapper John, M.D., and played Nurse Mendenhall in an episode of M*A*S*H. In 1980, she appeared in local commercials in the Chicago area and her first feature film role in A Small Circle of Friends. The film about social unrest at Harvard University during the 1960s enjoyed a level of critical success. In 1981, she played the role of Tala in Caveman. In 1982, she starred as Belinda, the "hooker with a heart of gold" neighbor of the character portrayed by Henry Winkler in Ron Howard's comedy Night Shift (also co-starring Michael Keaton), and starred with Tom Cruise in Losin' It (1983). She was offered the role of Mary, the mother in Steven Spielberg's E.T. the Extra-Terrestrial, but turned it down because she had already signed on to appear in Night Shift.

=== Cheers (1982–1987) ===
Although she had already been in feature films, Long became famous for her role in the long-running television sitcom Cheers as the character Diane Chambers, who has a tempestuous on-and-off relationship with Sam Malone. The show was slow to capture an audience but eventually became one of the more popular on the air. Amid some controversy, Long left Cheers after season five in 1987.

In the Cheers biography documentary, co-star Ted Danson admitted there was tension between them but "never at a personal level and always at a work level" due to their different modes of working. He also stated that Long was much more similar to her TV character than she might have liked to admit, but also said that her performances often "carried the show." Long said in later interviews that it did not occur to her, when deciding to leave, that she was going to "sabotage a show" and she felt confident that the rest of the cast could continue without her.

In a 2003 interview with Graham Norton, Long said she left for a variety of reasons, the most important of which was her desire to spend more time with her daughter. In a 2007 interview on Australian television, Long said Danson was "a delight to work with" and talked of her love for co-star Nicholas Colasanto ("Coach"), who was "one of my closest friends on set". She said she left the show because she "didn't want to keep doing the same episode over and over again and the same story. I didn't want it to become old and stale." She went on to say that "working at Cheers was a dream come true...it was one of the most satisfying experiences of my life. So, yes, I missed it, but I never regretted that decision."

=== Film ===
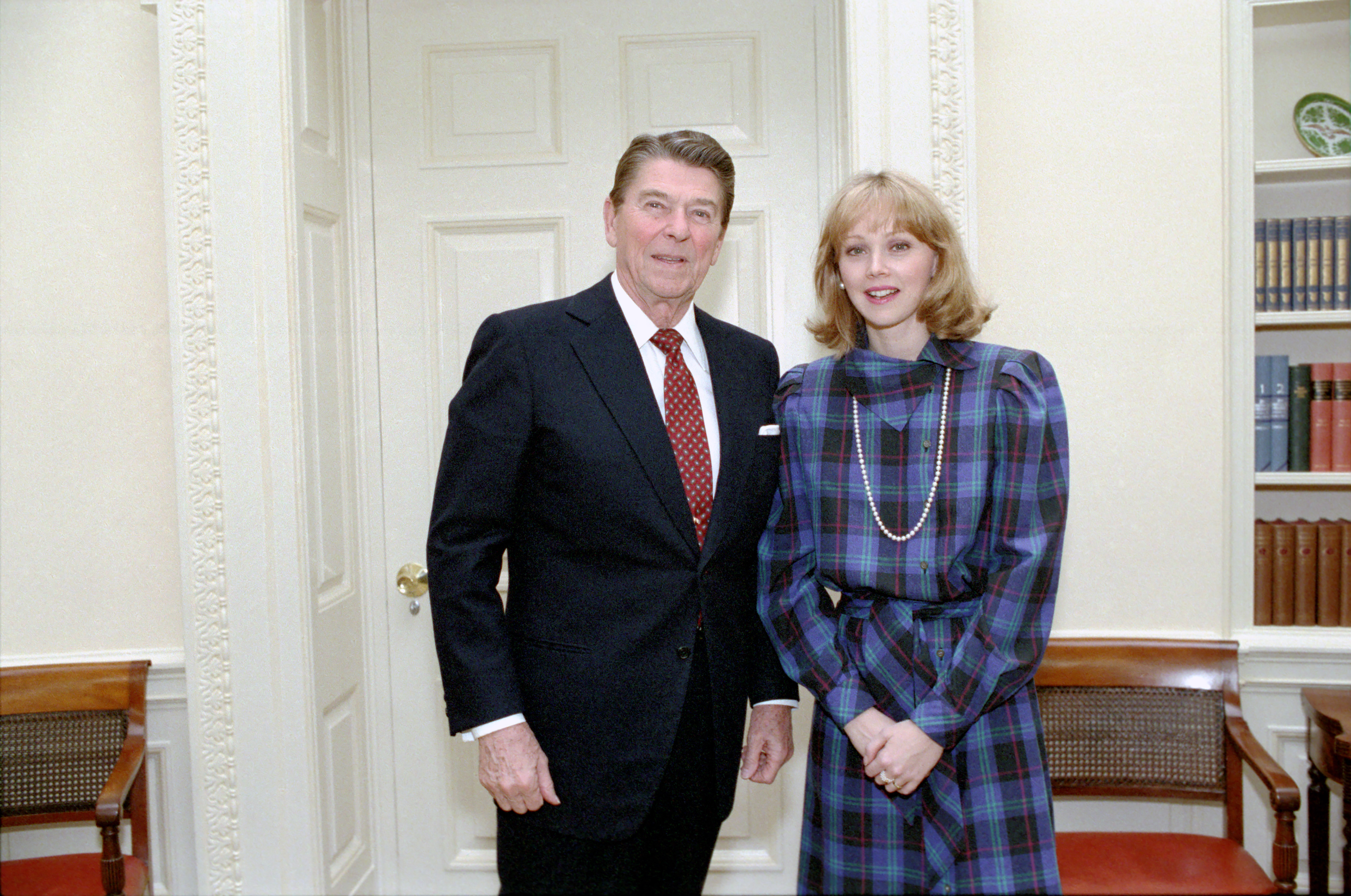
President Ronald Reagan and Long in the Oval Office, February 1984

While appearing on Cheers, Long continued to appear in motion pictures. In 1984, she was nominated for a Best Leading Actress Golden Globe for her performance in Irreconcilable Differences. She also starred in the comedies The Money Pit and Outrageous Fortune. She was offered lead roles in Working Girl, Jumpin' Jack Flash, and My Stepmother Is an Alien but did not accept them.

On August 12, 1986, Long signed a production agreement with The Walt Disney Studios through Itsbinso Long Inc. to produce three films for the Walt Disney Pictures and Touchstone Films labels.

=== Post-Cheers projects (1987–1994) ===
Long's first post-Cheers project was Hello Again, a comedy about a housewife who is brought back from the dead. This was followed by Troop Beverly Hills, a comedy about another housewife who takes leadership of a 'Wilderness Girl' troop to bond with her daughter and distract herself from divorce proceedings. Neither film was successful with critics or at the box office. Up to this day, Troop Beverly Hills has since acquired a cult following as a 1980s children's film.

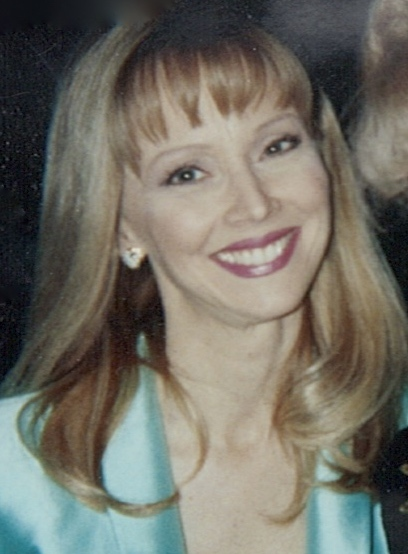
Long in 1996

In 1990, Long returned to television for the fact-based miniseries Voices Within: The Lives of Truddi Chase. She received critical praise for the role, which required her to portray nearly 20 personalities. This introduced her to more dramatic roles in TV films, after which she starred in several more throughout the 1990s.

Major feature film roles followed such as the romantic comedy Don't Tell Her It's Me with Jami Gertz and Steve Guttenberg and Frozen Assets, a comedy about a sperm bank, which reunited her with Hello Again co-star Corbin Bernsen.

In 1992, she starred in Fatal Memories: The Eileen Franklin Story, a television drama about a woman who remembers the childhood trauma of being raped by her father and his cronies, and witnessing him murder her childhood friend to prevent the child from "telling on him," based on a 1989 case. The still-controversial "recovered memories" basis for the prosecution resulted in the conviction and sentencing of life imprisonment of George Franklin, a conviction that was later overturned.

Long starred in the 1992 film A Message from Holly with Lindsay Wagner. Long plays a workaholic who finds out that her best friend has cancer and only six months to live, then stays with her in her last months.

In 1993, the actress returned to Cheers for its series finale, and picked up another Emmy nomination for her return as Diane. She also starred in the sitcom Good Advice with Treat Williams and Teri Garr, a show that lasted two seasons. She later resurfaced as Diane in several episodes of the Kelsey Grammer spinoff series Frasier, for which she was nominated for another Emmy Award.

Both Outrageous Fortune co-star Bette Midler and Paramount studio executive Richard H. Frank, who helped develop Cheers, described Long as being difficult to work with.

=== Later work (1995–2022) ===
Long appeared as Carol Brady in the 1995 film The Brady Bunch Movie, which is a campy take on the popular television show. In 1996, she reprised her role in A Very Brady Sequel, which had modest success, and a 2002 television film sequel—The Brady Bunch in the White House. Other ventures followed, including the TV remake of Freaky Friday and the family sitcom Kelly Kelly, which only lasted for a few episodes. She played the Wicked Witch of the Beanstalk in a 1998 episode of Sabrina, the Teenage Witch.

In 1999, she starred in another television film Vanished Without a Trace, about a woman who refuses to accept the kidnapping of her 13-year-old daughter and relentlessly pursues the villain's capture (not to be confused with the 1993 film of the same name about the 1976 Chowchilla kidnapping.) In 2000, she appeared as one of the women in the Richard Gere film Dr. T & the Women, directed by Robert Altman.

Long guest-starred in several TV shows such as 8 Simple Rules, Yes Dear, Strong Medicine, and Boston Legal. She had a recurring role on the ABC sitcom Modern Family as DeDe Pritchett, the ex-wife of Jay Pritchett. She starred in television films, including Falling in Love with the Girl Next Door and Holiday Engagement. In 2012, she made a guest appearance on Switched at Birth. In 2016, Long produced and acted in the feature film Different Flowers.

== Personal life ==
Long's first marriage, to Ken Solomon, ended in divorce in the 1970s after only a few years. In 1979, she met her second husband, Bruce Tyson, a securities broker. They married in 1981 and had a daughter, Juliana. Long and Tyson separated in 2003 and divorced in 2004.

== Filmography ==
=== Film ===
Year	Title	Role	Notes
1977	The Key	Narrator	Voice role
1980	A Small Circle of Friends	Alice	
1981	Caveman	Tala	
1982	Night Shift	Belinda Keaton	
1983	Losin' It	Kathy	
1984	Irreconcilable Differences	Lucy Van Patten Brodsky	Nominated – Golden Globe Award for Best Actress – Motion Picture Comedy or Musical
1986	The Money Pit	Anna Crowley Beissart Fielding	
1987	Outrageous Fortune	Lauren Ames	
1987	Hello Again	Lucy Chadman	Nominated – Nickelodeon Kids' Choice Award for Favorite Movie Actress
1989	Troop Beverly Hills	Phyllis Nefler	
1990	Don't Tell Her It's Me	Lizzie Potts	
1992	Frozen Assets	Grace Murdock	
1995	The Brady Bunch Movie	Carol Brady	
1996	A Very Brady Sequel	Carol Brady	
1998	The Adventures of Ragtime	Sam	
2000	Dr. T & the Women	Carolyn	
2007	A Couple of White Chicks at the Hairdresser	Barbara Kisner	
2007	Trust Me	Mitzi Robinson	
2008	Mr. Vinegar and the Curse	Ms. Persnickety	
2011	Pizza Man	Mrs. Burns	
2011	Zombie Hamlet	Shine Reynolds	Also co-producer
2013	The Wedding Chapel	Jeanie Robertson	
2013	Best Man Down	Gail	
2014	A Matter of Time	Nona	
2017	Different Flowers	Grandma Mildred	Also producer
2021	The Cleaner	Sharon Enderly	

=== Television ===
Year	Title	Role	Notes
1975–1978	Sorting it Out	Host	(Local Chicago show) Won 3 Regional Emmy Awards
1978	That Thing on ABC	Performer	Variety special
1978	The Love Boat	Heather McKenzie	Episode: "Memories of You/Computerman/Parlez Vous?"
1979	The Dooley Brothers	Lucy Bennett	Unaired pilot
1979	Young Guy Christian	Mia Mishugi	Unaired pilot
1979	The Cracker Factory	Cara	Television film
1979	Family	Joan Phillips	Episode: "Sleeping Over"
1979	Trapper John, M.D.	Lauren	Episode: "The Shattered Image"
1980	The Promise of Love	Lorraine Simpson	Television film
1980	M*A*S*H	Lt. Mendenhall	Episode: "Bottle Fatigue"
1981	The Princess and the Cabbie	Carol	Television film
1981	Ghost of a Chance	Jenny Clifford	Unaired pilot
1982–1987, 1993	Cheers	Diane Chambers	Primetime Emmy Award for Outstanding Lead Actress in a Comedy Series (1983); Golden Globe Award for Best Actress – Television Series Musical or Comedy (1985); Golden Globe Award for Best Supporting Actress – Series, Miniseries or Television Film (1983); TV Land Awards (2006–2007); Viewers for Quality Television Award (1985–1986); Nominated – American Comedy Award for Funniest Female Performer in a Television Series (1987); Nominated – Primetime Emmy Award for Outstanding Lead Actress in a Comedy Series (1984–1986); Nominated – Primetime Emmy Award for Outstanding Guest Actress in a Comedy Series (1993); Nominated – Golden Globe Award for Best Actress – Television Series Musical or Comedy (1984); Nominated – People's Choice Award for Favorite Female TV Performer (1984–1985)
1990	Voices Within: The Lives of Truddi Chase	Truddi Chase	Television film
1991	The Real Story of...	The Dame	Voice, episode: "Baa Baa Black Sheep"
1991	Memories of M*A*S*H	Host	Documentary
1992	Fatal Memories	Eileen Franklin Lipsker	Television film
1992	A Message from Holly	Kate	Television film
1993–1994	Good Advice	Susan DeRuzza	19 episodes
1993	Basic Values: Sex, Shock & Censorship in the 90's [sic]	Fay Sommerfield	Television film
1995	Lois & Clark: The New Adventures of Superman	Lucille Newtrich/Ultra Lucille	Episode: "Ultra Woman"
1995	Welcome to Paradise	Anne	Television film
1995	Freaky Friday	Ellen Andrews	Television film
1996	A Different Kind of Christmas	Elizabeth Gates	Television film
1996	Susie Q	Penny Sands	Television film
1995, 1996	Murphy Brown	Dottie Wilcox	2 episodes
1996, 2001	Frasier	Diane Chambers	3 episodes Nominated – Primetime Emmy Award for Outstanding Guest Actress in a Comedy Series (1996)
1996	Life with Louie	Sally Tubbs	Voice, episode: "A Fair to Remember"
1996	Boston Common	Louise Holmes	Episode: "Trustee and Sympathy"
1998	Sabrina the Teenage Witch	The Wicked Witch	Episode: "Sabrina and the Beanstalk"
1998	Kelly Kelly	Kelly Novack	7 episodes; also co-executive producer
1998	Diagnosis: Murder	Kay Ludlow	Episode: "Write, She Murdered"
1999	Vanished Without a Trace	Elizabeth Porterson	Television film
1999	Chicken Soup for the Soul	Teacher	Episode: "The Green Boots"
2000	Beggars and Choosers	Pamela Marston	Episode: "Fasten Your Seatbelts"
2002	The Brady Bunch in the White House	Carol Brady	Television film
2002	The Santa Trap	Molly Emerson	Television film
2003	8 Simple Rules	Mary Ellen Doyle	Episode: "The Doyle Wedding"
2003	Strong Medicine	Lauren Chase	Episode: "Jeaneology"
2004	Joan of Arcadia	Miss Candy	Episode: "Vanity, Thy Name Is Human"
2005	Boston Legal	Miriam Watson	Episode: "Death Be Not Proud"
2005	Yes, Dear	Margaret	Episode: "The New Neighbors"
2005	Complete Savages	Judy	2 episodes
2006	Falling in Love with the Girl Next Door	Betsy Lucas	Television film
2006	Honeymoon with Mom	Marla	Television film
2009	Ice Dreams	Harriet Clayton	Television film
2009–2018	Modern Family	DeDe Pritchett	8 episodes Nominated – Gold Derby Awards for Comedy Guest Actress (2010); Nominated – OFTA Television Award for Best Guest Actress in a Comedy Series (2011)
2010	Family Guy	Carol Brady	Voice, episode: "Excellence in Broadcasting"
2011	Holiday Engagement	Meredith Burns	Television film
2011	Retired at 35	Ginny	Episode: "Hit It and Quit It"
2011	A.N.T. Farm	Mrs. Busby	Episode: "PhilANThropy"
2012	Strawberry Summer	Eileen Landon	Television film
2012	Merry In-Laws	Mrs. Claus	Television film
2012	The Dog Who Saved the Hollidays	Aunt Barbara	Television film; also co-producer
2012	Switched at Birth	Rya Bellows	Episode: "Game On"
2013	Holiday Road Trip	Cynthia	Television film
2015	Instant Mom	Magician	Episode: "Bawamo Shazam"
2017	Christmas in the Heartland	Judy Wilkins	Television film
2017–2018	Milo Murphy's Law	Grandma Murphy	Voice, 2 episodes

== Awards and nominations ==
Year	Award	Category	Nominated work	Result	Ref.
1982	Golden Globe Awards	Best Supporting Actress – Series, Miniseries or Motion Picture Made for Television	Cheers	Won	
1983	Golden Globe Awards	Best Actress in a Television Series – Musical or Comedy	Cheers	Nominated	
1984	Golden Globe Awards	Best Actress in a Television Series – Musical or Comedy	Cheers	Won	
1984	Golden Globe Awards	Best Actress in a Motion Picture – Musical or Comedy	Irreconcilable Differences	Nominated	
2011	Online Film & Television Association Awards	Best Guest Actress in a Comedy Series	Modern Family	Nominated	
1983	Primetime Emmy Awards	Outstanding Lead Actress in a Comedy Series	Cheers	Won	
1984	Primetime Emmy Awards	Outstanding Lead Actress in a Comedy Series	Cheers	Nominated	
1985	Primetime Emmy Awards	Outstanding Lead Actress in a Comedy Series	Cheers	Nominated	
1986	Primetime Emmy Awards	Outstanding Lead Actress in a Comedy Series	Cheers	Nominated	
1993	Primetime Emmy Awards	Outstanding Guest Actress in a Comedy Series	Cheers (Episode: "One for the Road")	Nominated	
1996	Primetime Emmy Awards	Outstanding Guest Actress in a Comedy Series	Frasier (Episode: "The Show Where Diane Comes Back")	Nominated	
