= Elizabeth Crook =

American novelist

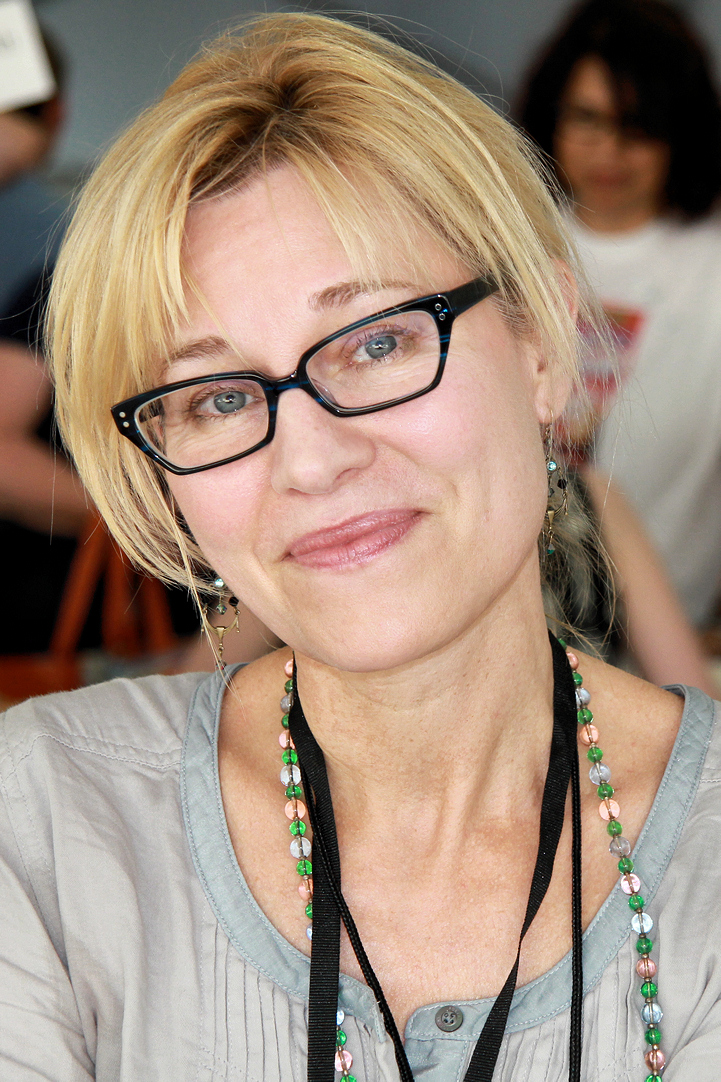
- Crook at the 2014 Texas Book Festival.
- Born: Elizabeth Crook; April 9, 1959 (age 67); Houston, Texas, U.S.
- Alma mater: Baylor University; Rice University
- Occupation: Novelist
- Writing career
- Genre: Historical Fiction
- Website: www.elizabethcrookbooks.com

Elizabeth Crook (born April 9, 1959) is an American novelist specializing in historical fiction. Her nonfiction work has been published in anthologies and periodicals such as Texas Monthly and Southwestern Historical Quarterly.

== Biography ==
Born in Houston, Texas, Crook lived in Nacogdoches and San Marcos, Texas, with her parents, brother and sister until 1966 when the family moved to Washington D.C., where her father, William H. Crook, was director of VISTA for Lyndon Johnson. Later, the family moved to Canberra, Australia, where her father was U.S. ambassador to Australia.

Returning to Texas, Crook graduated from San Marcos High School in 1977. She attended Baylor University for two years before transferring to Rice University, from which she graduated in 1982.

== Outreach and awards ==
Crook has served on the council of the Texas Institute of Letters. She is a member of Western Writers of America and was selected the honored writer for 2006 Texas Writers' Month, joining previous honorees O. Henry, J. Frank Dobie, John Graves, Larry McMurtry, Cormac McCarthy, Katherine Anne Porter, Elmer Kelton, Liz Carpenter, Sarah Bird, James Michener, and Horton Foote. The Night Journal was awarded the 2007 Spur award for Best Long Novel of the West and the 2007 Willa Literary Award for Historical Fiction. Monday, Monday received the Jesse H. Jones Fiction Award (the top prize) in the 2015 Texas Institute of Letters competition.

Two of Crook's novels (Promised Lands and The Raven's Bride) were edited at Doubleday by Jacqueline Onassis.

== Books ==
- The Which Way Tree (Little, Brown and Company, 2018)
- Monday, Monday (Sarah Crichton Books: Farrar, Straus and Giroux, 2014)
- The Night Journal (Viking, 2006) Publisher's notes: "A young woman discovers the truth about her family’s mythic past."
- Promised Lands: A Novel of the Texas Rebellion (Doubleday, 1993) Publisher's notes: "War is coming to the distant Mexican province of Texas, a war that will shatter one nation, create another, test the strength of family, and measure the worth of dreams."
- The Raven's Bride: A Novel of Eliza Allen and Sam Houston (Doubleday, 1991) Publishers Weekly: "Details the abrupt dissolution of Sam Houston's 11-week marriage to Eliza Allen in 1829, an event that caused lingering scandal and speculation."
