= Lowry Crossing, Texas =

- City
- Location of Lowry Crossing in Collin County, Texas
- Coordinates: 33°10′16″N 96°32′40″W
- Country: United States
- State: Texas
- County: Collin

Area
  - Total: 2.60 sq mi (6.74 km^{2})
  - Land: 2.59 sq mi (6.72 km^{2})
  - Water: 0.0077 sq mi (0.02 km^{2})
- Elevation: 548 ft (167 m)

Population (2020)
  - Total: 1,689
  - Density: 651/sq mi (251/km^{2})
- Time zone: UTC-6 (Central (CST))
  - Summer (DST): UTC-5 (CDT)
- FIPS code: 48-44308
- GNIS feature ID: 2410890
- Website: www.lowrycrossingtexas.org

Lowry Crossing is a city in Collin County, Texas, United States. The population was 1,689 at the 2020 census.

== Geography ==
According to the United States Census Bureau, the city has a total area of 2.8 square miles (7.3 km^{2}), all land.

== Demographics ==
Historical population
Census	Pop.	Note	%±
1980	443		—
1990	865		95.3%
2000	1,229		42.1%
2010	1,711		39.2%
2020	1,689		−1.3%
U.S. Decennial Census; 2020 Census

=== 2020 census ===
As of the 2020 census, Lowry Crossing had a population of 1,689. The median age was 45.3 years. 21.4% of residents were under the age of 18 and 15.8% of residents were 65 years of age or older. For every 100 females there were 103.5 males, and for every 100 females age 18 and over there were 99.5 males age 18 and over.

86.9% of residents lived in urban areas, while 13.1% lived in rural areas.

There were 610 households in Lowry Crossing, of which 33.8% had children under the age of 18 living in them. Of all households, 68.7% were married-couple households, 13.0% were households with a male householder and no spouse or partner present, and 13.8% were households with a female householder and no spouse or partner present. About 15.3% of all households were made up of individuals and 4.1% had someone living alone who was 65 years of age or older.

There were 635 housing units, of which 3.9% were vacant. The homeowner vacancy rate was 0.7% and the rental vacancy rate was 12.7%.

Racial composition as of the 2020 census
Race	Number	Percent
White	1,370	81.1%
Black or African American	19	1.1%
American Indian and Alaska Native	13	0.8%
Asian	11	0.7%
Native Hawaiian and Other Pacific Islander	0	0.0%
Some other race	120	7.1%
Two or more races	156	9.2%
Hispanic or Latino (of any race)	317	18.8%

=== 2000 census ===
At the 2000 census there were 1,229 people, 441 households, and 362 families living in the city. The population density was 440.8 inhabitants per square mile (170.2/km^{2}). There were 456 housing units at an average density of 163.5 per square mile (63.1/km^{2}). The racial makeup of the city was 93.98% White, 0.65% African American, 0.41% Native American, 0.73% Asian, 3.66% from other races, and 0.57% from two or more races. Hispanic or Latino of any race were 6.43%.

Of the 441 households 43.1% had children under the age of 18 living with them, 71.4% were married couples living together, 7.0% had a female householder with no husband present, and 17.7% were non-families. 14.3% of households were one person and 2.3% were one person aged 65 or older. The average household size was 2.79 and the average family size was 3.08.

The age distribution was 28.4% under the age of 18, 5.9% from 18 to 24, 36.1% from 25 to 44, 24.2% from 45 to 64, and 5.5% 65 or older. The median age was 35 years. For every 100 females, there were 105.2 males. For every 100 females age 18 and over, there were 105.6 males.

The median household income was $67,222 and the median family income was $73,393. Males had a median income of $50,066 versus $31,563 for females. The per capita income for the city was $26,574. About 1.2% of families and 3.0% of the population were below the poverty line, including 2.9% of those under age 18 and 2.2% of those age 65 or over.
